= 2023 in sports (T–Z) =

This page describes and summarizes the year 2023 in world sporting events for sports starting with the letters "T" through "Z".

== Table tennis ==
World, Continental, & Championships

- January 15–21: 2023 World Veterans Table Tennis Championships in (Oman) Muscat
  - (gold) : Germany, (silver) : India, (bronze) : Japan
- March 27 – April 1: 2023 Central American Table Tennis Championships (location TBA)
- April 5–9: 2023 European Under-21 Table Tennis Championships in (Bosnia and Herzegovina) Sarajevo
- May 20–28: 2023 World Table Tennis Championships in (South Africa) Durban
- June 5–11: 2023 South American Table Tennis Championships in (Peru) Lima
- July 14–23: 2023 European Youth Table Tennis Championships in (Poland) Gliwice
- September 3–9: 2023 Oceania Table Tennis Championships (location TBA)
- September 3–10: 2023 Asian Table Tennis Championships in South Korea (location TBA)
- September 10–17: 2023 Pan American Table Tennis Championships (location TBA)
- September 10–17: 2023 European Team Table Tennis Championships in (Sweden) Malmö
- September 11–17: 2023 African Table Tennis Championships in (Tunisia) Tunis

=== 2023 WTT Series ===
WTT Contender

- January 10–15: WTT Contender #1 in (South Africa) Durban
  - Singles winners: (Brazil) Hugo Calderano (m) / (China) Qian Tianyi (f)
  - Men's Doubles winners: China ( (Chen Yuanyu & Lin Shidong)
  - Women's Doubles winners: China (Zhang Rui & Man Kuai)
  - Mixed Doubles winners: China (Lin Shidong & Man Kuai)
- January 15–21: WTT Contender #2 in (Qatar) Doha
  - Singles winners: (Brazil) Hugo Calderano (m) / (China) Siqi Fan (f)
  - Men's Doubles winners: China ( (Yu Ziyang & Kai Zhou)
  - Women's Doubles winners: China (Zhang Rui & Man Kuai)
  - Mixed Doubles winners: China (Lin Shidong & Man Kuai)
- February 6–12: WTT Contender #3 in (Jordan) Amman
- June 12–18: WTT Contender #4 in (Nigeria) Lagos
- June 19–25: WTT Contender #5 in (Tunisia) Tunis
- June 26 – July 2: WTT Contender #6 in (Croatia) Zagreb
- July 31 – August 6: WTT Contender #7 in (Peru) Lima
- August 7–13: WTT Contender #8 in (Brazil) Rio de Janeiro

WTT Feeder

- January 22–26: WTT Feeder #1 in (Qatar) Doha
  - Singles winners: (China) Xu Yingbin (m) / (China) He Zhuojia (f)
  - Men's Doubles winners: China ( (Xiang Peng & Yuan Licen)
  - Women's Doubles winners: China (Qian Tianyi & Shi Xunyao)
  - Mixed Doubles winners: China (Lin Shidong & Man Kuai)

WTT Youth Contender

- January 11–14: WTT Youth Contender #1 in (Austria) Linz
  - Singles U19 winners: (Poland) Mateusz Żelengowski (m) / (Italy) Nicole Arlia (f)
  - Singles U17 winners: (Germany) Lleyton Ullmann (m) / (Belgium) Lilou Massart (f)
  - Singles U15 winners: (Japan) Tsubasa Okamoto (m) / (Germany) Koharu Itagaki (f)
  - Singles U13 winners: (Italy) Danila Faso (m) / (Czech Republic) Hanka Kodetová (f)
  - Singles U11 winners: (Austria) Louis Fegerl (m) / (Hungary) Lizett Fazekas (f)
  - Mixed Doubles U19 winners: (Romania) Horia Stefan Ursuț & Alesia Sferlea
  - Mixed Doubles U15 winners: (Czech Republic) Jan Škalda & Veronika Poláková
- January 27–30: WTT Youth Contender #2 in (Qatar) Doha

== Taekwondo ==
- May 29 – June 4: 2023 World Taekwondo Championships in (Azerbaijan) Baku
  - (gold) : South Korea, (silver) : Turkey, (bronze) : Croatia

== Tennis ==
=== 2023 Grand Slam ===
- January 16–29: 2023 Australian Open in (Australia) Melbourne
  - Men's singles: (Serbia) Novak Djokovic def. (Greece) Stefanos Tsitsipas, 6–3, 7–6^{(7–4)}, 7–6^{(7–5)}.
  - Men's doubles: (Australia) Rinky Hijikata & (Australia) Jason Kubler def. (Monaco) Hugo Nys & (Poland) Jan Zielinski, 6–4, 7–6^{(7–4)}.
  - Women's singles: Aryna Sabalenka def. (Kazakhstan) Elena Rybakina, 4–6, 6–3, 6–4.
  - Women's doubles: (Czech Republic) Barbora Krejčíková & (Czech Republic) Kateřina Siniaková def. (Japan) Shuko Aoyama & (Japan) Ena Shibahara, 6–4, 6–3.
  - Mixed doubles: (Brazil) Luisa Stefani & (Brazil) Rafael Matos def. (India) Sania Mirza & (India) Rohan Bopanna, 7–6^{(7–2)}, 6–2.
- May 28 – June 11: 2023 French Open in (France) Paris
  - Men's singles: (Serbia) Novak Djokovic def. (Norway) Casper Ruud, 7–6^{(7–1)}, 6–3, 7–5.
  - Men's doubles: (Croatia) Ivan Dodig & (United States) Austin Krajicek def. (Belgium) Sander Gillé & (Belgium) Joran Vliegen, 6–3, 6–1.
  - Women's singles: (Poland) Iga Świątek def. (Czech Republic) Karolína Muchová, 6–2, 5–7, 6–4.
  - Women's doubles: (Chinese Taipei) Hsieh Su-wei & (China) Wang Xinyu def. (Canada) Leylah Fernandez & (United States) Taylor Townsend 1–6, 7–6^{(7–5)}, 6–1.
  - Mixed doubles: (Japan) Miyu Kato & (Germany) Tim Pütz def. (Canada) Bianca Andreescu & (New Zealand) Michael Venus, 4–6, 6–4, [10–6].
- July 3–16: 2023 Wimbledon Championships in (United Kingdom) London
  - Men's singles: (Spain) Carlos Alcaraz def. (Serbia) Novak Djokovic, 1–6, 7–6^{(8–6)}, 6–1, 3–6, 6–4.
  - Men's doubles: (Netherlands) Wesley Koolhof & (United Kingdom) Neal Skupski def. (Spain) Marcel Granollers & (Argentina) Horacio Zeballos, 6–4, 6–4.
  - Women's singles: (Czech Republic) Markéta Vondroušová def. (Tunisia) Ons Jabeur, 6–4, 6–4.
  - Women's doubles: (Chinese Taipei) Hsieh Su-wei & (Czech Republic) Barbora Strýcová def. (Australia) Storm Hunter & (Belgium) Elise Mertens, 7–5, 6–4.
  - Mixed doubles: (Croatia) Mate Pavić & (Ukraine) Lyudmyla Kichenok def. (Belgium) Joran Vliegen & (China) Xu Yifan, 6–4, 6–7^{(9–11)}, 6–3.
- August 28 – September 10: 2023 U.S. Open in (United States) New York City
  - Men's singles: (Serbia) Novak Djokovic def. Daniil Medvedev, 6–3, 7–6^{(7–5)}, 6–3.
  - Men's doubles: (United States) Rajeev Ram & (United Kingdom) Joe Salisbury def. (India) Rohan Bopanna & (Australia) Matthew Ebden, 2–6, 6–3, 6–4.
  - Women's singles: (United States) Coco Gauff def. Aryna Sabalenka, 2–6, 6–3, 6–2.
  - Women's doubles: (Canada) Gabriela Dabrowski & (New Zealand) Erin Routliffe def. (Germany) Laura Siegemund & Vera Zvonareva, 7–6^{(11–9)}, 6–3.
  - Mixed doubles: (Kazakhstan) Anna Danilina & (Finland) Harri Heliövaara def. (United States) Jessica Pegula & (United States) Austin Krajicek, 6–3, 6–4.

=== ATP Tour ===
- December 29, 2022 – January 8: 2023 United Cup in (Australia) Brisbane, Perth, & Sydney (debut event)
  - The United States defeated Italy, 3–0, to win the inaugural United Cup championship.
- July 19–23: 2023 Hopman Cup in (France) Nice
- September 22–24: 2023 Laver Cup in (Canada) Vancouver
- November 12–19: 2023 ATP Finals in (Italy) Turin
- November 21–26: 2023 Davis Cup Finals in (Spain) Málaga

2023 ATP Tour Masters 1000

- March 8–19: 2023 BNP Paribas Open in (United States) Indian Wells
  - Singles: (Spain) Carlos Alcaraz def. Daniil Medvedev, 6–3, 6–2.
  - Doubles: (India) Rohan Bopanna & (Australia) Matthew Ebden def. (Netherlands) Wesley Koolhof & (United Kingdom) Neal Skupski, 6–3, 2–6, [10–8].
- March 22 – April 2: 2023 Miami Open in (United States) Miami Gardens
  - Singles: Daniil Medvedev def. (Italy) Jannik Sinner, 7–5, 6–3.
  - Doubles: (Mexico) Santiago González & (France) Édouard Roger-Vasselin def. (United States) Austin Krajicek & (France) Nicolas Mahut, 7–6^{(7–4)}, 7–5.
- April 9–16: 2023 Monte-Carlo Masters in (Monaco) Roquebrune-Cap-Martin
  - Singles: Andrey Rublev def. (Denmark) Holger Rune, 5–7, 6–2, 7–5.
  - Doubles: (Croatia) Ivan Dodig & (United States) Austin Krajicek def. (Monaco) Romain Arneodo & (Austria) Sam Weissborn, 6–0, 4–6, [14–12].
- April 26 – May 7: 2023 Mutua Madrid Open in (Spain) Madrid
  - Singles: (Spain) Carlos Alcaraz def. (Germany) Jan-Lennard Struff, 6–4, 3–6, 6–3.
  - Doubles: Karen Khachanov & Andrey Rublev def. (India) Rohan Bopanna & (Australia) Matthew Ebden, 6–3, 3–6, [10–3].
- May 10–21: 2023 Italian Open in (Italy) Rome
- August 7–13: 2023 National Bank Open in (Canada) Toronto
- August 13–20: 2023 Western & Southern Open in (United States) Mason
- October 4–15: 2023 Rolex Shanghai Masters in China
- October 30 – November 5: 2023 Rolex Paris Masters in France

ATP 500

- February 13–19: 2023 ABN AMRO Open in (Netherlands) Rotterdam
  - Singles: Daniil Medvedev def. (Italy) Jannik Sinner, 5–7, 6–2, 6–2.
  - Doubles: (Croatia) Ivan Dodig & (United States) Austin Krajicek def. (India) Rohan Bopanna & (Australia) Matthew Ebden, 7–6^{(7–5)}, 2–6, [12–10].
- February 20–26: 2023 Rio Open in (Brazil) Rio de Janeiro
  - Singles: (United Kingdom) Cameron Norrie def. (Spain) Carlos Alcaraz, 5–7, 6–4, 7–5.
  - Doubles: (Argentina) Máximo González & (Argentina) Andrés Molteni def. (Colombia) Juan Sebastián Cabal & (Brazil) Marcelo Melo, 6–1, 7–6^{(7–3)}.
- February 27 – March 4: 2023 Abierto Mexicano Telcel in (Mexico) Acapulco
  - Singles: (Australia) Alex de Minaur def. (United States) Tommy Paul, 3–6, 6–4, 6–1.
  - Doubles: (Austria) Alexander Erler & (Austria) Lucas Miedler def. (United States) Nathaniel Lammons & (United States) Jackson Withrow, 7–6^{(11–9)}, 7–6^{(7–3)}.
- February 27 – March 4: 2023 Dubai Tennis Championships in (United Arab Emirates) Dubai
  - Singles: Daniil Medvedev def. Andrey Rublev, 6–2, 6–2.
  - Doubles: (United States) Maxime Cressy & (France) Fabrice Martin def. (United Kingdom) Lloyd Glasspool & (Finland) Harri Heliövaara, 7–6^{(7–2)}, 6–4.
- April 17–23: 2023 Barcelona Open Banc Sabadell in (Spain) Barcelona
  - Singles: (Spain) Carlos Alcaraz def. (Greece) Stefanos Tsitsipas, 6–3, 6–4.
  - Doubles: (Argentina) Máximo González & (Argentina) Andrés Molteni def. (Netherlands) Wesley Koolhof & (United Kingdom) Neal Skupski 6–3, 6–7^{(8–10)}, [10–4].

ATP 250

- January 2–8: 2023 Adelaide International 1 in (Australia) Adelaide
  - Singles: (Serbia) Novak Djokovic def. (United States) Sebastian Korda, 6–7^{(8–10)}, 7–6^{(7–3)}, 6–4.
  - Doubles: (United Kingdom) Lloyd Glasspool & (Finland) Harri Heliövaara def. (United Kingdom) Jamie Murray & (New Zealand) Michael Venus, 6–3, 7–6^{(7–3)}.
- January 2–8: 2023 Tata Open Maharashtra in (India) Pune
  - Singles: (Netherlands) Tallon Griekspoor def. (France) Benjamin Bonzi, 4–6, 7–5, 6–3.
  - Doubles: (Belgium) Sander Gillé & (Belgium) Joran Vliegen def. (India) Sriram Balaji & (India) Jeevan Nedunchezhiyan, 6–4, 6–4.
- January 9–15: 2023 Adelaide International 2 in (Australia) Adelaide
  - Singles: (South Korea) Kwon Soon-woo def. (Spain) Roberto Bautista Agut, 6–4, 3–6, 7–6^{(7–4)}.
  - Doubles: (El Salvador) Marcelo Arévalo & (Netherlands) Jean-Julien Rojer def. (Croatia) Ivan Dodig & (United States) Austin Krajicek, Walkover.
- January 9–15: 2023 ASB Classic in (New Zealand) Auckland
  - Singles: (France) Richard Gasquet def. (United Kingdom) Cameron Norrie, 4–6, 6–4, 6–4.
  - Doubles: (Croatia) Nikola Mektić & (Croatia) Mate Pavić def. (United States) Nathaniel Lammons & (United States) Jackson Withrow, 6–4, 6–7^{(5–7)}, [10–6].
- February 6–12: 2023 Córdoba Open in (Argentina) Córdoba
  - Singles: (Argentina) Sebastián Báez def. (Argentina) Federico Coria, 6–1, 3–6, 6–3.
  - Doubles: (Argentina) Máximo González & (Argentina) Andrés Molteni def. (France) Sadio Doumbia & (France) Fabien Reboul, 6–4, 6–4.
- February 6–12: 2023 Open Sud de France in Montpellier
  - Singles: (Italy) Jannik Sinner def. (United States) Maxime Cressy, 7–6^{(7–3)}, 6–3.
  - Doubles: (Netherlands) Robin Haase & (Netherlands) Matwé Middelkoop def. (United States) Maxime Cressy & (France) Albano Olivetti, 7–6^{(7–4)}, 4–6, [10–6].
- February 6–12: 2023 Dallas Open in (United States) Dallas
  - Singles: (China) Wu Yibing def. (United States) John Isner, 6–7^{(4–7)}, 7–6^{(7–3)}, 7–6^{(14–12)}.
  - Doubles: (United Kingdom) Jamie Murray & (New Zealand) Michael Venus def. (United States) Nathaniel Lammons & (United States) Jackson Withrow, 1–6, 7–6^{(7–4)}, [10–7].
- February 13–19: 2023 Argentina Open in Buenos Aires
  - Singles: (Spain) Carlos Alcaraz def. (United Kingdom) Cameron Norrie, 6–3, 7–5.
  - Doubles: (Italy) Simone Bolelli & (Italy) Fabio Fognini def. (Colombia) Nicolás Barrientos & (Uruguay) Ariel Behar, 6–2, 6–4.
- February 13–19: 2023 Delray Beach Open in (United States) Delray Beach
  - Singles: (United States) Taylor Fritz def. (Serbia) Miomir Kecmanović, 6–0, 5–7, 6–2.
  - Doubles: (El Salvador) Marcelo Arévalo & (Netherlands) Jean-Julien Rojer def. (Australia) Rinky Hijikata & (United States) Reese Stalder, 6–3, 6–4.
- February 20–25: 2023 Qatar ExxonMobil Open in Doha
  - Singles: Daniil Medvedev def. (United Kingdom) Andy Murray, 6–4, 6–4.
  - Doubles: (India) Rohan Bopanna & (Australia) Matthew Ebden def. (France) Constant Lestienne & (Netherlands) Botic van de Zandschulp, 6–7^{(5–7)}, 6–4, [10–6].
- February 20–26: 2023 Open 13 Provence in (France) Marseille
  - Singles: (Poland) Hubert Hurkacz def. (France) Benjamin Bonzi, 6–3, 7–6^{(7–4)}.
  - Doubles: (Mexico) Santiago González & (France) Édouard Roger-Vasselin def. (France) Nicolas Mahut & (France) Fabrice Martin, 4–6, 7–6^{(7–4)}, [10–7].
- February 27 – March 5: 2023 Chile Open in Santiago
  - Singles: (Chile) Nicolás Jarry def. (Argentina) Tomás Martín Etcheverry, 6–7^{(5–7)}, 7–6^{(7–5)}, 6–2.
  - Doubles: (Italy) Andrea Pellegrino & (Italy) Andrea Vavassori def. (Brazil) Thiago Seyboth Wild & (Chile) Matías Soto, 6–4, 3–6, [12–10].
- April 3–9: 2023 U.S. Men's Clay Court Championships in (United States) Houston
  - Singles: (United States) Frances Tiafoe def. (Argentina) Tomás Martín Etcheverry, 7–6^{(7–1)}, 7–6^{(8–6)}.
  - Doubles: (Australia) Max Purcell & (Australia) Jordan Thompson def. (United Kingdom) Julian Cash & (United Kingdom) Henry Patten, 4–6, 6–4, [10–5].
- April 3–9: 2023 Grand Prix Hassan II in (Morocco) Marrakesh
  - Singles: (Spain) Roberto Carballés Baena def. (France) Alexandre Müller, 4–6, 7–6^{(7–3)}, 6–2.
  - Doubles: (Brazil) Marcelo Demoliner & (Italy) Andrea Vavassori def. (Austria) Alexander Erler & (Austria) Lucas Miedler, 6–4, 3–6, [12–10].
- April 3–9: 2023 Estoril Open in (Portugal) Cascais
  - Singles: (Norway) Casper Ruud def. (Serbia) Miomir Kecmanović, 6–2, 7–6^{(7–3)}.
  - Doubles: (Belgium) Sander Gillé & (Belgium) Joran Vliegen def. (Serbia) Nikola Ćaćić & (Serbia) Miomir Kecmanović, 6–3, 6–4.
- April 17–23: 2023 BMW Open in (Germany) Munich
  - Singles: (Denmark) Holger Rune def. (Netherlands) Botic van de Zandschulp 6–4, 1–6, 7–6^{(7–3)}.
  - Doubles: (Austria) Alexander Erler & (Austria) Lucas Miedler def. (Germany) Kevin Krawietz & (Germany) Tim Pütz, 6–3, 6–4.
- April 17–23: 2023 Srpska Open in (Bosnia and Herzegovina) Banja Luka
  - Singles: (Serbia) Dušan Lajović def. Andrey Rublev 6–3, 4–6, 6–4.
  - Doubles: (United Kingdom) Jamie Murray & (New Zealand) Michael Venus def. (Portugal) Francisco Cabral & (Kazakhstan) Aleksandr Nedovyesov, 7–5, 6–2.

== Triathlon ==
2023 World Triathlon Championship Series

- March 3: WTCS #1 in (United Arab Emirates) Abu Dhabi
  - Elite Men : Alex Yee (GBR)
  - Elite Women : Beth Potter (GBR)
- May 13 & 14: WTCS #2 in (Japan) Yokohama
  - Elite Men : Hayden Wilde (NZL)
  - Elite Women : Sophie Coldwell (GBR)
- May 27 & 28: WTCS #3 in (Italy) Cagliari
  - Elite Men : Alex Yee (GBR)
  - Elite Women : Georgia Taylor-Brown (GBR)
- June 24 & 25: WTCS #4 in (Canada) Montreal
  - Elite Men : Matthew Hauser (AUS)
  - Elite Women : Beth Potter (GBR)
- July 13 to 16: WTCS #5 in Hamburg (incorporating Sprint and Mixed Relay Championships)
  - Elite Men : Hayden Wilde (NZL)
  - Elite Women : Cassandre Beaugrand (FRA)
  - Mixed Relay : Germany (Tim Hellwig, Annika Koch, Simon Henseleit, Laura Lindemann)
- July 29 & 30: WTCS #6 in (United Kingdom) Sunderland
  - Elite Men : Pierre Le Corre (FRA)
  - Elite Women : Cassandre Beaugrand (FRA)
  - Mixed Relay : France (Tom Richard, Emma Lombardi, Pierre Le Corre, Cassandre Beaugrand)
- September 22–24: WTCS Finals in (Spain) Pontevedra
  - Elite Men : Dorian Coninx (FRA)
  - Elite Women : Beth Potter (GBR)

Triathlon World Championships

- March 24–26: 2023 World Triathlon Winter Championships in (Norway) Skeikampen
- April 29 – May 7: 2023 World Triathlon Multisport Championships in (Spain) Ibiza
- July 13–16: 2023 World Triathlon Sprint Distance Championships and Mixed Relay Championships in (Germany) Hamburg

Triathlon Continental Events

Africa

- May 21: 2023 African Triathlon Aquathlon Championships in (Egypt) Sharm El Sheikh
- August 6: 2023 Africa Triathlon Cross Championships in (Tunisia) Chebba
- September 9 & 10: 2023 Africa Triathlon Sprint Championships in (Mauritius) Shandrani
- October 13–15: 2023 African Triathlon & Duathlon Championships in (Egypt) Sharm El Sheikh
- November 18: 2023 Africa Triathlon Middle Distance Championships in (Senegal) Cap Skirring

Americas

- March 11: 2023 Americas Triathlon Para Championships in (United States) Sarasota
- May 6: 2023 Americas Triathlon Aquathlon Championships in (Venezuela) Puerto Cabello
- May 21: 2023 Americas Triathlon Duathlon Championships in (Colombia) Cali
- June 18 & 19: 2023 Americas Triathlon Mixed Relay Championships in (Mexico) Huatulco
- September 1–3: 2023 Americas Triathlon Championships #1 in (Mexico) Veracruz
- September 9: 2023 Americas Triathlon Championships #2 in (Colombia) Santa Marta
- September 24: 2023 Americas Triathlon Middle Distance Championships in (Argentina) Formosa
- November 25: 2023 Americas Triathlon Duathlon Championships in (Venezuela) Mérida

Asia

- June 24 & 25: 2023 Asia Triathlon Junior & U23 Championships in (Japan) Gamagōri
- October 29: 2023 Asia Triathlon Youth Championships in Hong Kong
- November 11 & 12: 2023 Asia Triathlon Sprint Championships in (Saudi Arabia) Khobar
- November 25 & 26: 2023 Asia Triathlon Duathlon Championships in (Philippines) New Clark City

Europe

- January 28 & 29: 2023 European Triathlon Winter Championships in (Andorra) Sant Julià de Lòria
  - Elite winners: (Italy) Franco Pesavento (m) / (Italy) Sandra Mairhofer (f)
  - U23 winners: (Italy) Mattia Tanara (m) / (Slovakia) Zuzana Michaličková (f)
  - Juniors winners: (Italy) Riccardo Giuliano (m) / (Spain) Sofía Lozano Barroso (f)
  - 2x2 Mixed Relay winners: Italy (Franco Pesavento & Sandra Mairhofer)
- March 17–19: 2023 Europe Triathlon Duathlon Championships in (Italy) Venice–Caorle
- June 2–4: 2023 European Triathlon Championships #1 in (Spain) Madrid
- July 20–23: 2023 Europe Triathlon Youth Championships Festival in (Spain) Banyoles
- August 5 & 6: 2023 Europe Triathlon Championships #2 in (Turkey) Balıkesir
- August 25–27: 2023 Europe Triathlon Multisport Championships in (Belgium) Menen
- September 9: 2023 Europe Triathlon Challenge Long Distance Championships in (Netherlands) Almere
- September 23 & 24: 2023 Europe Triathlon Mixed Relay Club Championships in (France) La Baule

Oceania

- February 5: 2023 Oceania Triathlon Para Championships in (Australia) Stockton
- February 25 & 26: 2023 Oceania Triathlon Junior & Mixed Relay Championships in (New Zealand) Taupō
- March 18: 2023 Oceania Triathlon Sprint Championships on (Australia) Devonport

2023 World Triathlon Cup

- March 25 & 26: WTC #1 in (New Zealand) New Plymouth
- May 6 & 7: WTC #2 in (South Korea) Yeongdo District
- June 17 & 18: WTC #3 in (Mexico) Huatulco
- July 8 & 9: WTC #4 in (Hungary) Tiszaújváros
- September 2 & 3: WTC #5 in (Spain) Valencia
- September 9 & 10: WTC #6 in (Czech Republic) Karlovy Vary
- October 7 & 8: WTC #7 in (Italy) Arzachena
- October 14 & 15: WTC #8 in (China) Chengdu
- October 21: WTC #9 in (South Korea) Tongyeong
- October 28 & 29: WTC #10 in (Japan) Miyazaki
- November 11 & 12: WTC #11 in (Chile) Viña del Mar
- November 18 & 19: WTC #12 (final) in (Uruguay) Montevideo

Americas Triathlon Cups

- February 11: Americas Triathlon Cup #1 in (Venezuela) La Guaira
- February 26: Americas Triathlon Cup #2 in (Cuba) Havana
- March 4: Americas Triathlon Cup #3 in (Mexico) La Paz
- March 5: Americas Triathlon Cup #4 & South American Championships in (Chile) Villarrica
- March 11: Americas Triathlon Cup #5 in (United States) Sarasota
- March 12: Americas Triathlon Cup #6 in (Chile) Pucón
- April 15 & 16: Americas Triathlon Cup #7 & Para Cup in (United States) St. Peters
- April 23: Americas Triathlon Cup #8 in (Ecuador) Salinas
- April 29 & 30: Americas Triathlon Cup #9 & South American Championships in (Peru) Lima
- May 13 & 14: Americas Triathlon Cup #10 & Central America and Caribbean Championships in (Dominican Republic) Punta Cana
- May 20: Americas Triathlon Cup #11 in (Mexico) Ixtapa
- June 11: Americas Triathlon Cup #12 in (Colombia) Chinchiná
- July 8: Americas Triathlon Cup #13 in (Canada) Montreal
- July 15: Americas Triathlon Cup #14 in (United States) Long Beach
- July 30: Americas Triathlon Cup #15 in (Ecuador) Manta
- November 12: Americas Triathlon Cup #16 in (Chile) Viña del Mar
- November 18: Americas Triathlon Cup #17 in (Uruguay) Montevideo

Europe Triathlon Cups

- March 19: Europe Triathlon Cup #1 in (Spain) Melilla
- March 25: Europe Triathlon Cup #2 in (Portugal) Quarteira
- April 9: Europe Triathlon Cup #3 in (Turkey) Yenişehir
- May 13: Europe Triathlon Cup #4 in (Italy) Caorle
- May 27: Europe Triathlon Cup #5 in (Poland) Olsztyn
- June 10: Europe Triathlon Cup #6 in (Poland) Rzeszów
- June 17: Europe Triathlon Cup #7 in (Austria) Kitzbühel
- June 24: Europe Triathlon Cup #8 in (Austria) Wels
- July 1: Europe Triathlon Premium Cup in (Netherlands) Holten
- October 8: Europe Triathlon Cup #9 in (Spain) Ceuta
- October 14: Europe Triathlon Cup #10 in (Turkey) Alanya

Asian Triathlon Cups

- February 25: Asian Triatlon Cup #1 (Sprint) in (Hong Kong) Plover Cove
- March 9–11: Asian Triathlon Cup #2 in (Oman) Musandam
- April 1 & 2: Asian Triathlon Cup #3 & South Asian Championships in (Nepal) Pokhara
- April 22 & 23: Asian Triathlon Cup #4 in (Philippines) Subic Bay
- May 27 & 28: Asian Triathlon Cup #5 in (Japan) Osaka
- June 3 & 4: Asian Triathlon Cup #6 in (Uzbekistan) Samarkand
- July 1 & 2: Asian Triathlon Cup #7 in (South Korea) Sejong City
- September 9 & 10: Asian Triathlon Cup #8 in (Kyrgyzstan) Cholpon-Ata
- October 19 & 20: Asian Duathlon Cup in (Iran) Tabriz
- October 28: Asian Triathlon Cup #9 (Standard) in Hong Kong
- November 4: Asian Triathlon Cup #10 & West Asian Championships in (Jordan) Aqaba
- November 18 & 19: Asian Triathlon Cup #11 in (Malaysia) Ipoh

Oceania Triathlon Cups

- February 17: Oceania Triathlon Cup #1 in (New Zealand) Wānaka
- February 25: Oceania Triathlon Cup #2 in (New Zealand) Taupō
- April 28: Oceania Triathlon Cup #3 in (Australia) Busselton
- April 30: Oceania Triathlon Para Cup in (Australia) Busselton

African Triathlon Cups

- February 5: African Duathlon Cup #1 in (Kenya) Tatu City
- February 26: African Triathlon Cup #1 in (South Africa) Maselspoort
- March 19: African Triathlon Premium Cup #1 in (South Africa) Nelson Mandela Bay Metropolitan Municipality
- March 25: African Triathlon Cup #2 in (Namibia) Swakopmund
- April 1: African Triathlon Cup #3 in (Zimbabwe) Troutbeck
- May 13: African Triathlon Cup #4 in (Morocco) M'diq
- May 19: African Triathlon Cup #5 in (Egypt) Sharm El Sheikh
- May 21: African Duathlon Cup #2 & Paratriathlon Cup in (Egypt) Sharm El Sheikh
- May 28: African Triathlon Cup #6 & Para Cup in (Tunisia) Hammamet
- July 8: African Triathlon Premium Cup #2 in (Morocco) Larache
- September 3: African Triathlon Cup #7 in (Tunisia) Monastir
- September 9 & 10: African Paratriathlon Cup in (Mauritius) Shandrani
- September 17: African Triatlon Cup #8 in (Morocco) Agadir
- October 13–15: African Aquathlon Cup in (Egypt) Sharm El Sheikh
- November 5: African Triathlon Cup #9 in (Tunisia) Djerba
- November 25: African Triathlon Cup #10 (Sprint) in (Kenya) Kilifi
- November 25: African Triathlon Cup #11 (Standard) in (Morocco) Dakhla, Western Sahara

Arena Games Triathlon Series

- February 25: AGTS #1 in (Canada) Montreal
- March 12: AGTS #2 in (Switzerland) Sursee
- March 25: AGTS #3 in Singapore
- April 8: AGTS #4 (final) in (United Kingdom) London

== Volleyball ==
=== FIVB World Championships ===
- July 7–16: 2023 FIVB Volleyball Men's U21 World Championship in (Bahrain) Manama
- August 1–11: 2023 FIVB Volleyball Girls' U19 World Championship in Croatia and Hungary
- August 4–13: 2023 FIVB Volleyball Boys' U19 World Championship in Argentina
- August 17–26: 2023 FIVB Volleyball Women's U20 World Championship in (Mexico) León & Aguascalientes City
- December 4–10: 2023 FIVB Volleyball Men's Club World Championship (location TBA)
- December 11–17: 2023 FIVB Volleyball Women's Club World Championship (location TBA)

=== Other FIVB events ===
- July 12–16: 2023 FIVB Volleyball Women's Nations League Finals in (United States) Arlington
- July 19–23: 2023 FIVB Volleyball Men's Nations League Finals in (Poland) Gdańsk
- September 30 – October 8: 2023 FIVB Volleyball Men's World Cup in Japan
- TBA: 2023 FIVB Volleyball Women's World Cup in Japan
- TBA: 2023 FIVB Volleyball Men's Challenger Cup (location TBA)
- TBA: 2023 FIVB Volleyball Women's Challenger Cup (location TBA)

=== European Volleyball Confederation (CEV) ===
- August 15 – September 3: 2023 Women's European Volleyball Championship in Belgium, Germany, Italy, & Estonia
- August 28 – September 16: 2023 Men's European Volleyball Championship in Italy, North Macedonia, Bulgaria, & Israel

== Woodchopping ==
=== Major International Competitions ===
- June 9: 2023 Rookie World Championship in (Netherlands) Rotterdam
  - Winner: (Poland) Szymon Groenwald
- June 10: 2023 World Trophy in (Netherlands) Rotterdam
  - Winner: (New Zealand) Jack Jordan
- July 30: 2023 European Trophy in (Poland) Poznań
  - Winner: (Netherlands) Redmer Knol
- September 3: 2023 European Nations Cup in (Austria) Seefeld
  - Winner: (Sweden) Emil Hansson
- September 3: 2023 European Nations Rookie Cup in (Austria) Seefeld
  - Winner: (Sweden) Edvin Karlsson
- November 3–4: 2023 TIMBERSPORTS World Championship in (Germany) Stuttgart
  - Individual Winner: (Australia) Jamie Head
  - Team Winners: Australia

== Weightlifting ==
=== World weightlifting championships ===
- March 25 – April 1: 2023 Youth World Weightlifting Championships in (Albania) Durrës
- September 2–17: 2023 World Weightlifting Championships in (Saudi Arabia) Riyadh
- TBA: 2023 Junior World Weightlifting Championships in (Mexico) Guadalajara

=== Continental & Regional weightlifting championships ===
- March 25 – April 2: 2023 Pan American Weightlifting Championships in (Argentina) Bariloche
- April 15–23: 2023 European Weightlifting Championships in (Armenia) Yerevan
- April 16–23: 2023 Central American & Caribbean Weightlifting Championships in (Dominican Republic) Santo Domingo
- May 3–13: 2023 Asian Weightlifting Championships in (South Korea) Jinju
- May 10–15: 2023 Pan American Junior Weightlifting Championships in (Colombia) Manizales
- May 11–20: 2023 African Weightlifting Championships in (Tunisia) Tunis
- July 1–8: 2023 South American Junior & Youth Weightlifting Championships in (Ecuador) Guayaquil
- July 1–10: 2023 European Youth & U15 Weightlifting Championships in (Moldova) Chișinău
- July 12–16: 2023 Commonwealth Senior, U23, Junior, & Youth Weightlifting Championships in (India) New Delhi
- July 24 – August 3: 2023 European Junior & U23 Weightlifting Championships in (Romania) Bucharest
- July 28 – August 5: 2023 Asian Youth & Junior Weightlifting Championships in (India) New Delhi
- August 12–17: 2023 Pan American Youth Weightlifting Championships in (Venezuela) Caracas
- August 17–19: 2023 Oceania U23, Junior, & Youth Weightlifting Championships in (Cook Islands) Rarotonga
- November 20–24: 2023 Oceania Weightlifting Championships in (Solomon Islands) Honiara (part of the 2023 Pacific Games)

=== IWF Grand Prix ===
- June 2–12: IWF Grand Prix #1 in (Cuba) Havana
- December 1–17: IWF Grand Prix #2 (final) in (Qatar) Doha

== Wrestling ==
=== 2023 Wrestling Continental Championships ===
- 13–19 March: 2023 European U23 Wrestling Championships in (Romania) Bucharest

Men's freestyle

  - Men's 57 kg winner: (Germany) Niklas Stechele
  - Men's 61 kg winner: (Ukraine) Andrii Dzhelep
  - Men's 65 kg winner: (France) Khamzat Arsamerzouev
  - Men's 70 kg winner: (Azerbaijan) Magomed Khaniev
  - Men's 74 kg winner: (Azerbaijan) Turan Bayramov
  - Men's 79 kg winner: (Greece) Georgios Kougioumtsidis
  - Men's 86 kg winner: (France) Rakhim Magamadov
  - Men's 92 kg winner: (Georgia (country)) Andro Margishvili
  - Men's 97 kg winner: (Azerbaijan) Islam Ilyasov
  - Men's 125 kg winner: (Bulgaria) Georgi Ivanov

Men's Greco Roman

  - Men's 55 kg winner: (Romania) Denis Florin Mihai
  - Men's 60 kg winner: (Azerbaijan) Elmir Aliyev
  - Men's 63 kg winner: (Finland) Tino Tapio Ojala
  - Men's 67 kg winner: (Georgia (country)) Diego Chkhikvadze
  - Men's 72 kg winner: (Azerbaijan) Gurban Gurbanov
  - Men's 77 kg winner: (Moldova) Alexandrin Guțu
  - Men's 82 kg winner: (Finland) Jonni Sarkkinen
  - Men's 87 kg winner: (Hungary) Dávid Losonczi
  - Men's 97 kg winner: (Azerbaijan) Murad Ahmadiyev
  - Men's 130 kg winner: (Ukraine) Mykhailo Vyshnyvetskyi

Women's freestyle

  - Women's 50 kg winner: (France) Emma Luttenauer
  - Women's 53 kg winner: (Turkey) Zeynep Yetgil
  - Women's 55 kg winner: (Sweden) Jonna Malmgren
  - Women's 57 kg winner: (Hungary) Anna Hella Szel
  - Women's 59 kg winner: (Ukraine) Solomiia Vynnyk
  - Women's 62 kg winner: (Ukraine) Iryna Bondar
  - Women's 65 kg winner: (Romania) Amina Capezan
  - Women's 68 kg winner: (Turkey) Nesrin Baş
  - Women's 72 kg winner: (Poland) Wiktoria Choluj
  - Women's 76 kg winner: (Ukraine) Anastasiya Alpyeyeva
- 9–14 April: 2023 Asian Wrestling Championships in (Kazakhstan) Astana

Men's freestyle

  - Men's 57 kg winner: (India) Aman Sehrawat
  - Men's 61 kg winner: (Kyrgyzstan) Taiyrbek Zhumashbek Uulu
  - Men's 65 kg winner: (Iran) Rahman Amouzad
  - Men's 70 kg winner: (Kazakhstan) Sanzhar Doszhanov
  - Men's 74 kg winner: (Kazakhstan) Darkhan Yessengali
  - Men's 79 kg winner: (Kazakhstan) Bolat Sakayev
  - Men's 86 kg winner: (Kazakhstan) Azamat Dauletbekov
  - Men's 92 kg winner: (Japan) Arash Yoshida
  - Men's 97 kg winner: (Bahrain) Akhmed Tazhudinov
  - Men's 125 kg winner: (Mongolia) Mönkhtöriin Lkhagvagerel

Men's Greco Roman

  - Men's 55 kg winner: (Iran) Pouya Dadmarz
  - Men's 60 kg winner: (Kyrgyzstan) Zholaman Sharshenbekov
  - Men's 63 kg winner: (Iran) Iman Mohammadi
  - Men's 67 kg winner: (Uzbekistan) Abror Atabaev
  - Men's 72 kg winner: (Kazakhstan) Ibragim Magomadov
  - Men's 77 kg winner: (Kyrgyzstan) Akzhol Makhmudov
  - Men's 82 kg winner: (Kyrgyzstan) Akylbek Talantbekov
  - Men's 87 kg winner: (Iran) Nasser Alizadeh
  - Men's 97 kg winner: (Iran) Mehdi Bali
  - Men's 130 kg winner: (Iran) Amin Mirzazadeh

Women's freestyle

  - Women's 50 kg winner: (Japan) Remina Yoshimoto
  - Women's 53 kg winner: (Japan) Akari Fujinami
  - Women's 55 kg winner: (China) Pang Qianyu
  - Women's 57 kg winner: (Japan) Sae Nanjo
  - Women's 59 kg winner: (Japan) Yui Sakano
  - Women's 62 kg winner: (Kyrgyzstan) Aisuluu Tynybekova
  - Women's 65 kg winner: (China) Long Jia
  - Women's 68 kg winner: (Japan) Ami Ishii
  - Women's 72 kg winner: (Kazakhstan) Zhamila Bakbergenova
  - Women's 76 kg winner: (Kazakhstan) Elmira Syzdykova
- 17–23 April: 2023 European Wrestling Championships in (Croatia) Zagreb

Men's freestyle

  - Men's 57 kg winner: (Azerbaijan) Aliabbas Rzazade
  - Men's 61 kg winner: (Armenia) Arsen Harutyunyan
  - Men's 65 kg winner: (Armenia) Vazgen Tevanyan
  - Men's 70 kg winner: (Azerbaijan) Haji Aliyev
  - Men's 74 kg winner: (Slovakia) Tajmuraz Salkazanov
  - Men's 79 kg winner: (Ukraine) Vasyl Mykhailov
  - Men's 86 kg winner: (Greece) Dauren Kurugliev
  - Men's 92 kg winner: (Turkey) Feyzullah Aktürk
  - Men's 97 kg winner: (Georgia (country)) Givi Matcharashvili
  - Men's 125 kg winner: (Turkey) Taha Akgül

Men's Greco Roman

  - Men's 55 kg winner: (Turkey) Adem Uzun
  - Men's 60 kg winner: (Bulgaria) Edmond Nazaryan
  - Men's 63 kg winner: (Georgia (country)) Leri Abuladze
  - Men's 67 kg winner: (Azerbaijan) Hasrat Jafarov
  - Men's 72 kg winner: (Azerbaijan) Ulvu Ganizade
  - Men's 77 kg winner: (Armenia) Malkhas Amoyan
  - Men's 82 kg winner: (Turkey) Burhan Akbudak
  - Men's 87 kg winner: (Hungary) István Takács
  - Men's 97 kg winner: (Armenia) Artur Aleksanyan
  - Men's 130 kg winner: (Turkey) Rıza Kayaalp

Women's freestyle

  - Women's 50 kg winner: (Azerbaijan) Mariya Stadnik
  - Women's 53 kg winner: (Sweden) Jonna Malmgren
  - Women's 55 kg winner: (Romania) Andreea Ana
  - Women's 57 kg winner: (Ukraine) Alina Hrushyna
  - Women's 59 kg winner: (Moldova) Anastasia Nichita
  - Women's 62 kg winner: (Ukraine) Iryna Koliadenko
  - Women's 65 kg winner: (Bulgaria) Mimi Hristova
  - Women's 68 kg winner: (Bulgaria) Yuliana Yaneva
  - Women's 72 kg winner: (Romania) Alexandra Anghel
  - Women's 76 kg winner: (Turkey) Yasemin Adar
- 3–7 May: 2023 Pan American Wrestling Championships in (Argentina) Buenos Aires

Men's freestyle

  - Men's 57 kg winner: (United States) Thomas Gilman
  - Men's 61 kg winner: (United States) Vito Arujau
  - Men's 65 kg winner: (United States) Yianni Diakomihalis
  - Men's 70 kg winner: (United States) Zain Retherford
  - Men's 74 kg winner: (United States) Kyle Dake
  - Men's 79 kg winner: (United States) Jordan Burroughs
  - Men's 86 kg winner: (Cuba) Yurieski Torreblanca
  - Men's 92 kg winner: (United States) Michael Macchiavello
  - Men's 97 kg winner: (United States) Kyle Snyder
  - Men's 125 kg winner: (United States) Dominique Bradley

Men's Greco Roman

  - Men's 55 kg winner: (United States) Dalton Duffield
  - Men's 60 kg winner: (United States) Dalton Roberts
  - Men's 67 kg winner: (Cuba) Luis Orta
  - Men's 72 kg winner: (United States) Justus Scott
  - Men's 77 kg winner: (United States) Kamal Bey
  - Men's 82 kg winner: (United States) Spencer Woods
  - Men's 87 kg winner: (Cuba) Daniel Grégorich
  - Men's 97 kg winner: (United States) Joe Rau
  - Men's 130 kg winner: (Cuba) Óscar Pino

Women's freestyle

  - Women's 50 kg winner: (United States) Sarah Hildebrandt
  - Women's 53 kg winner: (Ecuador) Lucía Yépez
  - Women's 55 kg winner: (Canada) Diana Weicker
  - Women's 57 kg winner: (Ecuador) Luisa Valverde
  - Women's 59 kg winner: (United States) Xochitl Mota-Pettis
  - Women's 62 kg winner: (Canada) Ana Godinez
  - Women's 65 kg winner: (United States) Mallory Velte
  - Women's 68 kg winner: (United States) Forrest Molinari
  - Women's 72 kg winner: (United States) Amit Elor
  - Women's 76 kg winner: (Cuba) Milaimys Potrille
- 15–21 May: 2023 African Wrestling Championships in (Tunisia) Hammamet

Men's freestyle

  - Men's 57 kg winner: (Guinea-Bissau) Diamantino Iuna Fafé
  - Men's 61 kg winner: (Algeria) Abdelhak Kherbache
  - Men's 65 kg winner: (Tunisia) Farouk Jelassi
  - Men's 70 kg winner: (Egypt) Said El Gahsh
  - Men's 74 kg winner: (Egypt) Amr Reda Hussen
  - Men's 79 kg winner: (Egypt) Ahmed Khaled Mohamed
  - Men's 86 kg winner: (Algeria) Fateh Benferdjallah
  - Men's 92 kg winner: (Tunisia) Imed Kaddidi
  - Men's 97 kg winner: (Egypt) Mostafa Elders
  - Men's 125 kg winner: (Egypt) Diaaeldin Kamal

Men's Greco Roman

  - Men's 55 kg winner: (Algeria) Mohamed Yacine Dridi
  - Men's 60 kg winner: (Egypt) Haithem Mahmoud
  - Men's 63 kg winner: (Algeria) Abdeldjebar Djebbari
  - Men's 67 kg winner: (Egypt) Mohamed Ibrahim El-Sayed
  - Men's 72 kg winner: (Algeria) Abdelmalek Merabet
  - Men's 77 kg winner: (Egypt) Mohamed Zahab Khalil
  - Men's 82 kg winner: (Algeria) Abdelkrim Ouakali
  - Men's 87 kg winner: (Algeria) Bachir Sid Azara
  - Men's 97 kg winner: (Egypt) Mohamed Ali Gabr
  - Men's 130 kg winner: (Egypt) Abdellatif Mohamed

Women's freestyle

  - Women's 50 kg winner: (Nigeria) Mercy Genesis
  - Women's 53 kg winner: (Nigeria) Christianah Ogunsanya
  - Women's 55 kg winner: (Nigeria) Jumoke Adekoye
  - Women's 57 kg winner: (Nigeria) Mercy Adekuoroye
  - Women's 59 kg winner: (Tunisia) Siwar Bousetta
  - Women's 62 kg winner: (Tunisia) Marwa Amri
  - Women's 65 kg winner: (Tunisia) Khadija Jlassi
  - Women's 68 kg winner: (Nigeria) Blessing Oborududu
  - Women's 72 kg winner: (Nigeria) Ebi Biogos
  - Women's 76 kg winner: (Egypt) Samar Amer
- 12–18 June: 2023 European Cadets Wrestling Championships in (Albania) Tirana

Men's freestyle

  - Men's 45 kg winner: (Azerbaijan) Jafar Jafarov
  - Men's 48 kg winner: (Authorised Neutral Athletes) Magomed Magomedov
  - Men's 51 kg winner: (Georgia (country)) Giorgi Maisuradze
  - Men's 55 kg winner: (Azerbaijan) Haji Karimov
  - Men's 60 kg winner: (Azerbaijan) Jamal Abbasov
  - Men's 65 kg winner: (Germany) Manuel Wagin
  - Men's 71 kg winner: (Armenia) Narek Nikoghosyan
  - Men's 80 kg winner: (Moldova) Alexandru Bors
  - Men's 92 kg winner: (Georgia (country)) Sandro Kurashvili
  - Men's 110 kg winner: (Azerbaijan) Yusif Dursunov

Men's Greco Roman

  - Men's 45 kg winner: (Azerbaijan) Turan Dashdamirov
  - Men's 48 kg winner: (Authorised Neutral Athletes) Murat Khatit
  - Men's 51 kg winner: (Authorised Neutral Athletes) Ilia Kandalin
  - Men's 55 kg winner: (Georgia (country)) Erekle Tavberidze
  - Men's 60 kg winner: (Authorised Neutral Athletes) Kiryl Valeuski
  - Men's 65 kg winner: (Armenia) Petros Ashkaryan
  - Men's 71 kg winner: (Authorised Neutral Athletes) Abdurakhman Abdulkadyrov
  - Men's 80 kg winner: (Poland) Stanislaw Fussy
  - Men's 92 kg winner: (Georgia (country)) Saba Purtseladze
  - Men's 110 kg winner: (Georgia (country)) Saba Chilashvili

Women's freestyle

  - Women's 40 kg winner: (Germany) Klara Winkler
  - Women's 43 kg winner: (Authorised Neutral Athletes) Aleksandra Berezovskaia
  - Women's 46 kg winner: (Authorised Neutral Athletes) Valeriya Yerameyeva
  - Women's 49 kg winner: (Authorised Neutral Athletes) Sviatlana Katenka
  - Women's 53 kg winner: (Italy) Fabiana Rinella
  - Women's 57 kg winner: (Hungary) Sophie Ritter
  - Women's 61 kg winner: (Authorised Neutral Athletes) Ekaterina Radysheva
  - Women's 65 kg winner: (Turkey) Duygu Gen
  - Women's 69 kg winner: (Croatia) Veronika Vilk
  - Women's 73 kg winner: (Sweden) Elvira Ersson
- 17–25 June: 2023 Asian U23 and Cadets Wrestling Championship in (Jordan) Amman City
- 22–25 June: 2023 Pan American Cadets Wrestling Championships in Mexico City
- 26 June–2 July: 2023 European Juniors Wrestling Championships in (Spain) Santiago de Compostela
- 1–9 July: 2023 Asian Juniors Wrestling Championships in (Jordan) Amman City
- 1–9 July: 2023 Pan American Juniors Wrestling Championships in (Chile) Santiago
- 31 July- 6 August: 2023 World Cadet Wrestling Championships in (Turkey) Istanbul

Men's freestyle

  - Men's 45 kg winner: (Iran) Ahora Khateri
  - Men's 48 kg winner: (United States) Paul Joseph Kenny
  - Men's 51 kg winner: (Japan) Yamato Ogawa
  - Men's 55 kg winner: (United States) Marcus Glenn Blaze
  - Men's 60 kg winner: (Japan) Akito Maehara
  - Men's 65 kg winner: (Iran) Sina Mahdi Khalili
  - Men's 71 kg winner: (United States) Ladarion Lockett
  - Men's 80 kg winner: (Authorised Neutral Athletes) Magomed Idrisov
  - Men's 92 kg winner: (Georgia (country)) Sandro Kurashvili
  - Men's 110 kg winner: (Azerbaijan) Yusif Dursunov

Men's Greco Roman

  - Men's 45 kg winner: (Azerbaijan) Turan Dashdamirov
  - Men's 48 kg winner: (Iran) Payam Balootaki
  - Men's 51 kg winner: (Authorised Neutral Athletes) Ilia Kandalin
  - Men's 55 kg winner: (United States) Jordyn Raney
  - Men's 60 kg winner: (Azerbaijan) Roman Karimov
  - Men's 65 kg winner: (Authorised Neutral Athletes) Zaur Beslekoev
  - Men's 71 kg winner: (Greece) Arionas Kolitsopoulos
  - Men's 80 kg winner: (Japan) Taizo Yoshida
  - Men's 92 kg winner: (Georgia (country)) Saba Purtseladze
  - Men's 110 kg winner: (Turkey) Cemal Yusuf Bakır

Women's freestyle

  - Women's 40 kg winner: (Japan) Koharu Akutsu
  - Women's 43 kg winner: (United States) Morgan Nicole Turner
  - Women's 46 kg winner: (Japan) Natsumi Masuda
  - Women's 49 kg winner: (Japan) Rinka Ogawa
  - Women's 53 kg winner: (Japan) Sakura Onishi
  - Women's 57 kg winner: (Japan) Sowaka Uchida
  - Women's 61 kg winner: (India) Savita
  - Women's 65 kg winner: (Japan) Chisato Yoshida
  - Women's 69 kg winner: (Croatia) Veronika Vilk
  - Women's 73 kg winner: (United States) Piper Fowler
- 8–9 August: 2023 Oceania Wrestling Championships in (Australia) Sydney
- 16–24 September: 2023 World Wrestling Championships in (Serbia) Belgrade
  - Men's 57 kg winner: (Serbia) Stevan Mićić
  - Men's 61 kg winner: (United States) Vito Arujau
  - Men's 65 kg winner: (Hungary) Iszmail Muszukajev
  - Men's 70 kg winner: (United States) Zain Retherford
  - Men's 74 kg winner: (Authorised Neutral Athletes) Zaurbek Sidakov
  - Men's 79 kg winner: (Authorised Neutral Athletes) Akhmed Usmanov
  - Men's 86 kg winner: (United States) David Taylor
  - Men's 92 kg winner: (Kazakhstan) Rizabek Aitmukhan
  - Men's 97 kg winner: (Bahrain) Akhmed Tazhudinov
  - Men's 125 kg winner: (Iran) Amir Hossein Zare

Men's Greco Roman

  - Men's 55 kg winner: (Azerbaijan) Eldaniz Azizli
  - Men's 60 kg winner: (Kyrgyzstan) Zholaman Sharshenbekov
  - Men's 63 kg winner: (Georgia (country)) Leri Abuladze
  - Men's 67 kg winner: (Cuba) Luis Orta
  - Men's 72 kg winner: (France) Ibrahim Ghanem
  - Men's 77 kg winner: (Kyrgyzstan) Akzhol Makhmudov
  - Men's 82 kg winner: (Azerbaijan) Rafig Huseynov
  - Men's 87 kg winner: (Turkey) Ali Cengiz
  - Men's 97 kg winner: (Cuba) Gabriel Rosillo
  - Men's 130 kg winner: (Iran) Amin Mirzazadeh

Women's freestyle

  - Women's 50 kg winner: (Japan) Yui Susaki
  - Women's 53 kg winner: (Japan) Akari Fujinami
  - Women's 55 kg winner: (Japan) Haruna Okuno
  - Women's 57 kg winner: (Japan) Tsugumi Sakurai
  - Women's 59 kg winner: (China) Zhang Qi
  - Women's 62 kg winner: (Kyrgyzstan) Aisuluu Tynybekova
  - Women's 65 kg winner: (Japan) Nonoka Ozaki
  - Women's 68 kg winner: (Turkey) Buse Tosun
  - Women's 72 kg winner: (United States) Amit Elor
  - Women's 76 kg winner: (Japan) Yuka Kagami
- 10–15 October: 2023 Veterans World Wrestling Championships in (Greece) Loutraki
- 23–29 October: 2023 U23 World Wrestling Championships in (Albania) Tirana
  - Men's 57 kg winner: (Authorised Neutral Athletes) Nachyn Mongush
  - Men's 61 kg winner: (Authorised Neutral Athletes) Bashir Magomedov
  - Men's 65 kg winner: (Authorised Neutral Athletes) Ibragim Ibragimov
  - Men's 70 kg winner: (Authorised Neutral Athletes) Inalbek Sheriev
  - Men's 74 kg winner: (United States) Keegan O'Toole
  - Men's 79 kg winner: (Authorised Neutral Athletes) Magomed Magomaev
  - Men's 86 kg winner: (United States) Aaron Brooks
  - Men's 92 kg winner: (Turkey) Muhammed Gimri
  - Men's 97 kg winner: (United States) Isaac Trumble
  - Men's 125 kg winner: (United States) Wyatt Hendrickson

Men's Greco Roman

  - Men's 55 kg winner: (Georgia (country)) Giorgi Tokhadze
  - Men's 60 kg winner: (Authorised Neutral Athletes) Anvar Allakhiarov
  - Men's 63 kg winner: (Authorised Neutral Athletes) Rakhman Tavmurzaev
  - Men's 67 kg winner: (Kazakhstan) Sultan Assetuly
  - Men's 72 kg winner: (Authorised Neutral Athletes) Dmitrii Adamov
  - Men's 77 kg winner: (Moldova) Alexandrin Guţu
  - Men's 82 kg winner: (Authorised Neutral Athletes) Aues Gonibov
  - Men's 87 kg winner: (Authorised Neutral Athletes) Magomed Murtazaliev
  - Men's 97 kg winner: (Authorised Neutral Athletes) Pavel Hlinchuk
  - Men's 130 kg winner: (Turkey) Hamza Bakır

Women's freestyle

  - Women's 50 kg winner: (Japan) Umi Ito
  - Women's 53 kg winner: (Japan) Mako Oono
  - Women's 55 kg winner: (Japan) Umi Imai
  - Women's 57 kg winner: (Japan) Sara Natami
  - Women's 59 kg winner: (Ukraine) Solomiia Vynnyk
  - Women's 62 kg winner: (Japan) Yuzuka Inagaki
  - Women's 65 kg winner: (Moldova) Irina Rîngaci
  - Women's 68 kg winner: (Turkey) Nesrin Baş
  - Women's 72 kg winner: (United States) Amit Elor
  - Women's 76 kg winner: (India) Reetika Hooda

=== 2023 Wrestling Ranking Series ===
Ranking Series Calendar 2023:

- 1–5 February: 1st Ranking Series: 2023 Grand Prix Zagreb Open in (Croatia) Zagreb

Men's Freestyle

  - Men's 57 kg winner: (Azerbaijan) Aliabbas Rzazade
  - Men's 61 kg winner: (Iran) Reza Atri
  - Men's 65 kg winner: (Mongolia) Tömör-Ochiryn Tulga
  - Men's 70 kg winner: (United States) Alec Pantaleo
  - Men's 74 kg winner: (United States) Jason Nolf
  - Men's 79 kg winner: (Iran) Ali Savadkouhi
  - Men's 86 kg winner: (Iran) Hassan Yazdani
  - Men's 92 kg winner: (United States) Kollin Moore
  - Men's 97 kg winner: (United States) Kyle Snyder
  - Men's 125 kg winner: (Iran) Amir Hossein Zare

Men's Greco Roman

  - Men's 55 kg winner: (Iran) Pouya Dadmarz
  - Men's 60 kg winner: (Iran) Mehdi Mohsennejad
  - Men's 63 kg winner: (Azerbaijan) Taleh Mammadov
  - Men's 67 kg winner: (China) Husiyuetu
  - Men's 72 kg winner: (Turkey) Selçuk Can
  - Men's 77 kg winner: (Iran) Mohammad Ali Geraei
  - Men's 82 kg winner: (Iran) Alireza Mohmadipiani
  - Men's 87 kg winner: (Hungary) István Takács
  - Men's 97 kg winner: (Bulgaria) Kiril Milov
  - Men's 130 kg winner: (Cuba) Óscar Pino

Women's

  - Women's 50 kg winner: (Japan) Yui Susaki
  - Women's 53 kg winner: (Japan) Akari Fujinami
  - Women's 55 kg winner: (Japan) Moe Kiyooka
  - Women's 57 kg winner: (Japan) Sae Nanjo
  - Women's 59 kg winner: (Moldova) Anastasia Nichita
  - Women's 62 kg winner: (Japan) Sakura Motoki
  - Women's 65 kg winner: (Japan) Mahiro Yoshitake
  - Women's 68 kg winner: (France) Koumba Larroque
  - Women's 72 kg winner: (United States) Skylar Grote
  - Women's 76 kg winner: (United States) Yelena Makoyed
- 23–26 June: 2nd Ranking Series: 2023 Ibrahim Moustafa Tournament in (Egypt) Alexandria

Men's Freestyle

  - Men's 57 kg winner: (Turkey) Süleyman Atlı
  - Men's 61 kg winner: (Kyrgyzstan) Taiyrbek Zhumashbek Uulu
  - Men's 65 kg winner: (Armenia) Vazgen Tevanyan
  - Men's 70 kg winner: (Kyrgyzstan) Ernazar Akmataliev
  - Men's 74 kg winner: (Romania) Iakub Shikhdzamalov
  - Men's 79 kg winner: (Georgia (country)) Avtandil Kentchadze
  - Men's 86 kg winner: (Ukraine) Vasyl Mykhailov
  - Men's 92 kg winner: (United States) Kollin Moore
  - Men's 97 kg winner: (Slovakia) Batyrbek Tsakulov
  - Men's 125 kg winner: (Turkey) Taha Akgül

Men's Greco Roman

  - Men's 55 kg winner: (Kazakhstan) Amangali Bekbolatov
  - Men's 60 kg winner: (Turkey) Kerem Kamal
  - Men's 63 kg winner: (Iran) Meisam Dalkhani
  - Men's 67 kg winner: (Kazakhstan) Merey Bekenov
  - Men's 72 kg winner: (Georgia (country)) Ramaz Zoidze
  - Men's 77 kg winner: (Bulgaria) Aik Mnatsakanian
  - Men's 82 kg winner: (Georgia (country)) Gela Bolkvadze
  - Men's 87 kg winner: (Georgia (country)) Lasha Gobadze
  - Men's 97 kg winner: (Iran) Mohammad Hadi Saravi
  - Men's 130 kg winner: (Egypt) Abdellatif Mohamed

Women's

  - Women's 50 kg winner: (China) Feng Ziqi
  - Women's 53 kg winner: (Ecuador) Lucía Yépez
  - Women's 55 kg winner: (United States) Jacarra Winchester
  - Women's 57 kg winner: (Canada) Alexandria Town
  - Women's 59 kg winner: (Ukraine) Yuliya Tkach
  - Women's 62 kg winner: (Kyrgyzstan) Aisuluu Tynybekova
  - Women's 65 kg winner: (Ukraine) Tetiana Rizhko
  - Women's 68 kg winner: (United States) Forrest Molinari
  - Women's 72 kg winner: (Italy) Dalma Caneva
  - Women's 76 kg winner: (United States) Kennedy Blades
- 1–4 June: 3rd Ranking Series: 2023 Kaba Uulu Kozhomkul & Raatbek Sanatbaev Tournament in (Kyrgyzstan) Bishkek

Men's freestyle

  - Men's 57 kg winner: (Kyrgyzstan) Almaz Smanbekov
  - Men's 61 kg winner: (Kyrgyzstan) Taiyrbek Zhumashbek Uulu
  - Men's 65 kg winner: (Mongolia) Tömör-Ochiryn Tulga
  - Men's 70 kg winner: (Kyrgyzstan) Orozobek Toktomambetov
  - Men's 74 kg winner: (Azerbaijan) Turan Bayramov
  - Men's 79 kg winner: (Georgia (country)) Vladimer Gamkrelidze
  - Men's 86 kg winner: (Bahrain) Magomed Sharipov
  - Men's 92 kg winner: (Georgia (country)) Miriani Maisuradze
  - Men's 97 kg winner: (Bahrain) Akhmed Tazhudinov
  - Men's 125 kg winner: (Georgia (country)) Geno Petriashvili

Men's Greco Roman

  - Men's 55 kg winner: (Kazakhstan) Marlan Mukashev
  - Men's 60 kg winner: (Uzbekistan) Islomjon Bakhromov
  - Men's 63 kg winner: (Georgia (country)) Leri Abuladze
  - Men's 67 kg winner: (Iran) Danial Sohrabi
  - Men's 72 kg winner: (Georgia (country)) Ramaz Zoidze
  - Men's 77 kg winner: (Iran) Mohammad Ali Geraei
  - Men's 82 kg winner: (Georgia (country)) Alireza Mohmadi
  - Men's 87 kg winner: (Uzbekistan) Jalgasbay Berdimuratov
  - Men's 97 kg winner: (Iran) Mohammad Hadi Saravi
  - Men's 130 kg winner: (Iran) Amin Mirzazadeh

Women's freestyle

  - Women's 50 kg winner: (China) Meng Fan
  - Women's 53 kg winner: (Mongolia) Batkhuyagiin Khulan
  - Women's 55 kg winner: (Kazakhstan) Marina Sedneva
  - Women's 57 kg winner: (Ukraine) Alina Hrushyna
  - Women's 59 kg winner: (Ukraine) Yuliya Tkach
  - Women's 62 kg winner: (Ukraine) Ilona Prokopevniuk
  - Women's 65 kg winner: (India) Manisha Bhanwala
  - Women's 68 kg winner: (China) Zhou Feng
  - Women's 72 kg winner: (Kazakhstan) Zhamila Bakbergenova
  - Women's 76 kg winner: (Kyrgyzstan) Aiperi Medet Kyzy
- 13–16 July: 4th Ranking Series: 2023 Polyák Imre & Varga János Memorial Tournament in (Hungary) Budapest

Men's freestyle

  - Men's 57 kg winner: (China) Zou Wanhao
  - Men's 61 kg winner: (Albania) Zelimkhan Abakarov
  - Men's 65 kg winner: (Mongolia) Tömör-Ochiryn Tulga
  - Men's 70 kg winner: (Ukraine) Ihor Nykyforuk
  - Men's 74 kg winner: (Hungary) Murad Kuramagomedov
  - Men's 79 kg winner: (Iran) Mohammad Nokhodi
  - Men's 86 kg winner: (San Marino) Myles Amine
  - Men's 92 kg winner: (United States) Zahid Valencia
  - Men's 97 kg winner: (United States) Kyle Snyder
  - Men's 125 kg winner: (United States) Mason Parris

Men's Greco Roman

  - Men's 55 kg winner: (Kazakhstan) Amangali Bekbolatov
  - Men's 60 kg winner: (Turkey) Kerem Kamal
  - Men's 63 kg winner: (Azerbaijan) Murad Mammadov
  - Men's 67 kg winner: (Azerbaijan) Hasrat Jafarov
  - Men's 72 kg winner: (Iran) Danial Sohrabi
  - Men's 77 kg winner: (Azerbaijan) Sanan Suleymanov
  - Men's 82 kg winner: (Hungary) Erik Szilvássy
  - Men's 87 kg winner: (Hungary) Dávid Losonczi
  - Men's 97 kg winner: (Hungary) Tamás Lévai
  - Men's 130 kg winner: (Iran) Amir Ghasemi Monjazi

Women's freestyle

  - Women's 50 kg winner: (United States) Sarah Hildebrandt
  - Women's 53 kg winner: (Mongolia) Bat-Ochiryn Bolortuyaa
  - Women's 55 kg winner: (United States) Jacarra Winchester
  - Women's 57 kg winner: (Moldova) Anastasia Nichita
  - Women's 59 kg winner: (United States) Jennifer Page
  - Women's 62 kg winner: (Kyrgyzstan) Aisuluu Tynybekova
  - Women's 65 kg winner: (Moldova) Irina Rîngaci
  - Women's 68 kg winner: (China) Zhou Feng
  - Women's 72 kg winner: (Kazakhstan) Zhamila Bakbergenova
  - Women's 76 kg winner: (China) Qiandegenchagan

=== 2023 Wrestling International tournament ===
- 14 January: 2023 Herman Kare Tournament in (Finland) Kouvola
  - Men's 60 kg winner: (Switzerland) Mathias Martinetti
  - Men's 67 kg winner: (Finland) Nestori Mannila
  - Men's 72 kg winner: (Switzerland) Michael Portmann
  - Men's 77 kg winner: (Finland) Akseli Yli-Hannuksela
  - Men's 82 kg winner: (Finland) Jonni Sarkkinen
  - Men's 87 kg winner: (Finland) Waltteri Latvala
  - Men's 97 kg winner: (Estonia) Robin Uspenski
  - Men's 130 kg winner: (Estonia) Eerik Pank
- 20–22 January: Grand Prix de France Henri Deglane 2023 in Nice

Men's Freestyle

  - Men's 57 kg winner: (United States) Nick Suriano
  - Men's 61 kg winner: (United States) Austin DeSanto
  - Men's 65 kg winner: (United States) Patricio Lugo
  - Men's 70 kg winner: (United States) Alec Pantaleo
  - Men's 74 kg winner: (United States) Joseph Lavallee
  - Men's 79 kg winner: (United States) Evan Wick
  - Men's 86 kg winner: (France) Ruslan Valiev
  - Men's 97 kg winner: (Georgia (country)) Merab Suleimanishvili
  - Men's 125 kg winner: (Georgia (country)) Nika Berulava

Men's Greco Roman

  - Men's 55 kg winner: (Georgia (country)) Akaki Osiashvili
  - Men's 60 kg winner: (Georgia (country)) Pridon Abuladze
  - Men's 63 kg winner: (Latvia) Aleksandrs Jurkjans
  - Men's 67 kg winner: (Cuba) Luis Orta
  - Men's 72 kg winner: (France) Ibrahim Ghanim
  - Men's 77 kg winner: (Ukraine) Serhii Kozub
  - Men's 82 kg winner: (Ukraine) Yaroslav Filchakov
  - Men's 87 kg winner: (Ukraine) Zhan Beleniuk
  - Men's 97 kg winner: (Ukraine) Vladlen Kozliuk
  - Men's 130 kg winner: (Cuba) Óscar Pino

Women's

  - Women's 50 kg winner: (Nigeria) Christianah Ogunsanya
  - Women's 53 kg winner: (Germany) Anastasia Blayvas
  - Women's 57 kg winner: (Germany) Elena Brugger
  - Women's 62 kg winner: (Canada) Ana Godinez
  - Women's 65 kg winner: (Bulgaria) Taybe Yusein
  - Women's 68 kg winner: (France) Koumba Larroque
  - Women's 72 kg winner: (Germany) Lilly Schneider
  - Women's 76 kg winner: (Kazakhstan) Elmira Syzdykova
- 17–19 February: 2023 Klippan Lady Open in (Sweden) Klippan

Women's

  - Women's 50 kg winner: (Japan) Mihoko Takeuchi
  - Women's 53 kg winner: (Sweden) Jonna Malmgren
  - Women's 55 kg winner: (Canada) Diana Weicker
  - Women's 59 kg winner: (Norway) Othelie Høie
  - Women's 62 kg winner: (Japan) Suzu Sasaki
  - Women's 65 kg winner: (United States) Elleni Johnson
  - Women's 68 kg winner: (Canada) Olivia Di Bacco
  - Women's 76 kg winner: (Canada) Erica Wiebe
- 2–5 March: 2023 Dan Kolov & Nikola Petrov Tournament in (Bulgaria) Sofia

Men's Freestyle

  - Men's 57 kg winner: (Turkey) Ahmet Duman
  - Men's 61 kg winner: (Turkey) Recep Topal
  - Men's 65 kg winner: (Japan) Kotaro Kiyooka
  - Men's 70 kg winner: (Bulgaria) Ramazan Ramazanov
  - Men's 74 kg winner: (Hungary) Murad Kuramagomedov
  - Men's 79 kg winner: (Iran) Mostafa Ghiyasicheka
  - Men's 86 kg winner: (Iran) Hadi Vafaeipour
  - Men's 92 kg winner: (Iran) Arashk Mohebi
  - Men's 97 kg winner: (United States) Kyle Snyder
  - Men's 125 kg winner: (Azerbaijan) Giorgi Meshvildishvili

Men's Greco Roman

  - Men's 55 kg winner: (Turkey) Adem Uzun
  - Men's 60 kg winner: (Kyrgyzstan) Zholaman Sharshenbekov
  - Men's 63 kg winner: (Bulgaria) Abu Muslim Amaev
  - Men's 67 kg winner: (Armenia) Slavik Galstyan
  - Men's 72 kg winner: (Iran) Shahin Mofrad
  - Men's 77 kg winner: (Kyrgyzstan) Akzhol Makhmudov
  - Men's 82 kg winner: (Norway) Exauce Mukubu
  - Men's 87 kg winner: (Bulgaria) Semen Novikov
  - Men's 97 kg winner: (Norway) Felix Baldauf
  - Men's 130 kg winner: (Iran) Morteza Alghosi

Women's

  - Women's 50 kg winner: (Azerbaijan) Mariya Stadnik
  - Women's 53 kg winner: (Japan) Yumi Shimono
  - Women's 55 kg winner: (Japan) Akari Fujinami
  - Women's 57 kg winner: (Ecuador) Luisa Valverde
  - Women's 59 kg winner: (Japan) Sara Natami
  - Women's 62 kg winner: (Japan) Yuzuka Inagaki
  - Women's 65 kg winner: (Japan) Naomi Ruike
  - Women's 68 kg winner: (Bulgaria) Yuliana Yaneva
  - Women's 72 kg winner: (Romania) Maria Larisa Nitu
  - Women's 76 kg winner: (Turkey) Yasemin Adar
- 24–25 March: 2023 Thor Masters Tournament in (Denmark) Nykobing Falster
- 1–2 April: 2023 Kristjan Palusalu Memorial Tournament in (Estonia) Tallinn
- 15–16 April: 2023 Flatz Austria Open in Wolfurt
- 21–23 April: 2023 Tournoi International de la Ville d'Abidjan in (Ivory Coast) Abidjan
- 22–23 April: 2023 Indian Ocean Friendship Tournament in Mauritius
- 12–15 May: 2023 Muhamet Malo Tournament in (Albania) Tirana
- 2–3 June: 2023 Pat Shaw Memorial Tournament in Guatemala City
- 9–10 June: 2023 Macedonian Pearl Tournament in (North Macedonia) Skopje
- 9–10 June: 2023 Sassari City Matteo Pellicone Memorial Tournament in (Italy) Sassari
- 17–18 June: 2023 Druskininkai Cup in (Lithuania) Druskininkai
- 21–25 June: 2023 Yasar Dogu Tournament and 2023 Vehbi Emre & Hamit Kaplan Tournament in (Turkey) Istanbul
- 7–9 July: 2023 Grand Prix of Spain in Madrid
- 27–30 July: 2023 Ziolkowski, Pytlasinski, Poland Open in Warsaw
- 4 August: 2023 Ljubomir Ivanovic Gedza Memorial Tournament in (Serbia) Mladenovac
- 11–13 August: 2023 Grand Prix of Germany in Dortmund
- 17–20 August: 2023 Ion Cornianu & Ladislau Simon Tournament in (Romania) Bucharest
- 2–6 November: 2023 Kunayev D.A. Tournament in (Kazakhstan) Taraz City
- 9–11 November: 2023 Mediterranean Championships in (Egypt) Alexandria

== See also ==
- 2023 in sports
  - 2023 in sports (A)
  - 2023 in sports (B)
  - 2023 in sports (C–J)
  - 2023 in sports (K–S)
