= 2019 Wrestling World Cup – Women's freestyle =

2019 Wrestling World Cup - Women's freestyle
- Host city: Narita, Japan
- Dates: November 16–17, 2019
- Stadium: Nakadai Sports Park Gymnasium

Champions
- Women: (gold) Japan; (silver) United States; (bronze) China

The 2019 Wrestling World Cup - Women's freestyle was the first of a set of three Wrestling World Cups in 2019 which were held in Narita, Japan on 16–17 November 2019.

== Pool stage ==
Teams qualified for the 1st place match
Teams qualified for the 3rd place match
Teams qualified for the 5th place match

=== Pool A ===
Pos	Team	Pld	W	L	CP	TP
1	Japan	2	2	0	55	113
2	China	2	1	1	53	103
3	Ukraine	2	0	2	14	36

POOL A
Round I

Japan 9 – 1 Ukraine
Weight	Japan	result	Ukraine
50 kg	Kika Kagata	2 – 1	Mariia Vynnyk
53 kg	Ibuki Tamura	14 – 5	Solomiia Vynnyk
55 kg	Saki Igarashi	13 – 3	Anastasiya Kravchenko
57 kg	Sae Nanjō	10 – 0	Olena Kremzer
59 kg	Yumeka Tanabe	10 – 0	Sofiia Bodnar
62 kg	Miwa Morikawa	10^{F} – 2	Tetiana Rizhko
65 kg	Naomi Ruike	5 – 2	Oksana Chudyk
68 kg	Naruha Matsuyuki	6 – 0	Alina Levytska
72 kg	Mei Shindo	1 – 6^{F}	Alla Belinska
76 kg	Yasuha Matsuyuki	10 – 0	Romana Vovchak

Round II

Japan 6 – 4 China
Weight	Japan	result	China
50 kg	Yui Susaki	3 – 2	Sun Yanan
53 kg	Haruna Okuno	4 – 3	Pang Qianyu
55 kg	Akie Hanai	6 – 0	Chen Jiawei
57 kg	Risako Kawai	6 – 0	Feng Yongxin
59 kg	Yuzuka Inagaki	2 – 0	Rong Ningning
62 kg	Yukako Kawai	8^{F} – 0	Kang Juan
65 kg	Misuzu Enomoto	2 – 4	Wu Yaru
68 kg	Naruha Matsuyuki	0 – 2	Zhou Feng
72 kg	Yuka Kagami	1 – 7	Wang Juan
76 kg	Hiroe Minagawa	0 – 7	Zhou Qian

Round III

China 9 – 1 Ukraine
Weight	China	result	Ukraine
50 kg	Sun Yanan	8^{F} – 0	Mariia Vynnyk
53 kg	Luo Lannuan	8 – 0	Solomiia Vynnyk
55 kg	Xie Mengyu	15 – 4	Anastasiya Kravchenko
57 kg	Feng Yongxin	6 – 4	Olena Kremzer
59 kg	Rong Ningning	13 – 0	Sofiia Bodnar
62 kg	Kang Juan	WO –	Tetiana Rizhko
65 kg	Wu Yaru	10 – 0	Oksana Chudyk
68 kg	Zhou Feng	8^{F} – 0	Alina Levytska
72 kg	Wang Juan	6 – 9	Alla Belinska
76 kg	Zhou Qian	4^{F} – 0	Romana Vovchak

=== Pool B ===
Pos	Team	Pld	W	L	CP	TP
1	United States	2	2	0	56	105
2	Mongolia	2	1	1	41	90
3	Russia	2	0	2	30	99

POOL B
Round I

Russia 4 – 6 Mongolia
Weight	Russia	result	Mongolia
50 kg	Daria Leksina	2 – 10^{F}	Buyandalain Chimgee
53 kg	Milana Dadasheva	10 – 1	Nandintsetsegiin Anudari
55 kg	Olga Khoroshavtseva	4 – 4	Bat-Ochiryn Bolortuyaa
57 kg	Marina Simonyan	5 – 12	Altansetsegiin Battsetseg
59 kg	Lyubov Ovcharova	14 – 1	Baatarjavyn Shoovdor
62 kg	Uliana Tukurenova	2 – 8	Enkhbatyn Gantuyaa
65 kg	Natalia Fedoseeva	7 – 3	Ölziisaikhany Pürevsüren
68 kg	Anastasia Bratchikova	0 – 5	Enkhsaikhany Delgermaa
72 kg	Evgenia Zakharchenko	1 – 2	Enkh-Amaryn Davaanasan
76 kg	Ekaterina Bukina	10^{F} – 0	Ganbatyn Ariunjargal

Round II

Russia 2 – 8 United States
Weight	Russia	result	United States
50 kg	Daria Leksina	0 – 7	Whitney Conder
53 kg	Milana Dadasheva	7 – 10	Sarah Hildebrandt
55 kg	Olga Khoroshavtseva	4 – 5	Jacarra Winchester
57 kg	Marina Simonyan	10 – 0	Kelsey Campbell
59 kg	Lyubov Ovcharova	10 – 0	Desiree Zavala
62 kg	Uliana Tukurenova	0^{R} – 0	Macey Kilty
65 kg	Natalia Fedoseeva	2 – 3^{F}	Forrest Molinari
68 kg	Anastasia Bratchikova	0 – 8	Tamyra Mensah
72 kg	Evgenia Zakharchenko	5 – 8^{F}	Victoria Francis
76 kg	Ekaterina Bukina	6 – 11	Adeline Gray

Round III

United States 6 – 4 Mongolia
Weight	United States	result	Mongolia
50 kg	Whitney Conder	4 – 3	Tsogt-Ochiryn Namuuntsetseg
53 kg	Sarah Hildebrandt	6^{F} – 0	Nandintsetsegiin Anudari
55 kg	Jacarra Winchester	4 – 4^{F}	Bat-Ochiryn Bolortuyaa
57 kg	Kelsey Campbell	0 – 8	Altansetsegiin Battsetseg
59 kg	Desiree Zavala	2 – 12	Baatarjavyn Shoovdor
62 kg	Macey Kilty	4 – 2	Enkhbatyn Gantuyaa
65 kg	Forrest Molinari	6 – 2	Ölziisaikhany Pürevsüren
68 kg	Tamyra Mensah	10^{F} – 0	Enkhsaikhany Delgermaa
72 kg	Victoria Francis	7 – 13	Enkh-Amaryn Davaanasan
76 kg	Adeline Gray	10^{F} – 0	Ganbatyn Ariunjargal

== Medal Matches ==
Medal Matches
First Place Match

Japan 7 – 3 United States
Weight	Japan	result	United States
50 kg	Yui Susaki	10 – 0	Whitney Conder
53 kg	Haruna Okuno	10 – 0	Sarah Hildebrandt
55 kg	Akie Hanai	1 – 5	Jacarra Winchester
57 kg	Risako Kawai	11 – 0	Kelsey Campbell
59 kg	Yuzuka Inagaki	10 – 0	Desiree Zavala
62 kg	Yukako Kawai	7 – 0	Macey Kilty
65 kg	Naomi Ruike	5 – 1	Forrest Molinari
68 kg	Naruha Matsuyuki	1 – 8	Tamyra Mensah
72 kg	Yuka Kagami	3 – 1	Victoria Francis
76 kg	Hiroe Minagawa	1 – 3^{F}	Adeline Gray

Third Place Match

China 7 – 3 Mongolia
Weight	China	result	Mongolia
50 kg	Lei Chun	10 – 0	Buyandalain Chimgee
53 kg	Pang Qianyu	10 – 0	Nandintsetsegiin Anudari
55 kg	Chen Jiawei	10 – 12	Bat-Ochiryn Bolortuyaa
57 kg	Feng Yongxin	10 – 0	Altantsetsegiin Battsetseg
59 kg	Zhang Qi	8 – 2	Baatarjavyn Shoovdor
62 kg	Kang Juan	2 – 12	Enkhbatyn Gantuyaa
65 kg	Wu Yaru	4 – 10^{F}	Ölziisaikhany Pürevsüren
68 kg	Zhou Feng	8^{F} – 0	Enkhsaikhany Delgermaa
72 kg	Wang Juan	9 – 2	Enkh-Amaryn Davaanasan
76 kg	Qiandegenchagan	4^{F} – 0	Ganbatyn Ariunjargal

Fifth Place Match

Ukraine 5.df – 5 Russia
Weight	Canada	result	Belarus
50 kg	Mariia Vynnyk	8 – 7	Daria Leksina
53 kg	Solomiia Vynnyk	16 – 14	Milana Dadasheva
55 kg	Anastasiya Kravchenko	2 – 13	Olga Khoroshavtseva
57 kg	Olena Kremzer	6^{F} – 3	Marina Simonyan
59 kg	Sofiia Bodnar	1 – 6	Lyubov Ovcharova
62 kg	Tetiana Rizhko	WO –	Uliana Tukurenova
65 kg	Oksana Chudyk	3 – 5	Natalia Fedoseeva
68 kg	Alina Levytska	1 – 4	Anastasia Bratchikova
72 kg	Alla Belinska	4^{F} – 0	Evgenia Zakharchenko
76 kg	Romana Vovchak	0 – 10	Ekaterina Bukina

== Final ranking ==
Team	Pld	W	L
Japan	3	3	0
United States	3	2	1
China	3	2	1
Mongolia	3	1	2
Ukraine	3	1	2
Russia	3	0	3

== See also ==
- 2019 Wrestling World Cup - Men's Greco-Roman
- 2019 Wrestling World Cup - Men's freestyle
