= 2023 U23 World Wrestling Championships – Women's freestyle 62 kg =

Wrestling competitions

Women's freestyle 62 kg at the 2023 U23 World Championships
- Venue: Tirana Olympic Park
- Dates: 26–27 October
- Competitors: 17 from 14 nations

Medalists
gold medal	Yuzuka Inagaki	Japan
silver medal	Iryna Bondar	Ukraine
bronze medal	Irina Kuznetsova	Kazakhstan
bronze medal	Alina Kasabieva	Authorised Neutral Athletes

The women's freestyle 62 kilograms is a competition featured at the 2023 U23 World Wrestling Championships, and will held in Tirana, Albania on 26 and 27 October 2023.

This freestyle wrestling competition consists of a single-elimination tournament, with a repechage used to determine the winner of two bronze medals. The two finalists face off for gold and silver medals. Each wrestler who loses to one of the two finalists moves into the repechage, culminating in a pair of bronze medal matches featuring the semifinal losers each facing the remaining repechage opponent from their half of the bracket.

== Results ==
Legend

- F — Won by fall

=== Final ===
Final
Iryna Bondar (UKR)	0
Yuzuka Inagaki (JPN)	4^{F}

=== Top half ===
Round of 32
Ameyalli Jessel (MEX)	2
Adaugo Nwachukwu (USA)	6

Round of 16
Morena De Vita (ITA)	0
Iryna Bondar (UKR)	10
Adaugo Nwachukwu (USA)	0
Irina Kuznetsova (KAZ)	12
Aleah Nickel (CAN)	6^{F}
Améline Douarre (FRA)	4
Bhagyashree Fand (UWW)	2
Yana Tretsiak (ANA)	1

Quarterfinals
Iryna Bondar (UKR)	13
Irina Kuznetsova (KAZ)	4
Aleah Nickel (CAN)	3
Bhagyashree Fand (UWW)	8

Semifinals
Iryna Bondar (UKR)	10
Bhagyashree Fand (UWW)	0

=== Bottom half ===
Round of 32

Round of 16
Alina Kasabieva (ANA)	10
Birgul Soltanova (AZE)	0
Esther Kolawole (NGR)	8
Astrid Montero (VEN)	7
Viktoria Vesso (EST)	0
Yuzuka Inagaki (JPN)	7^{F}
~~Kleona Shabani (ALB)~~
Selvi İlyasoğlu (TUR)	WO

Quarterfinals
Alina Kasabieva (ANA)	7^{F}
Esther Kolawole (NGR)	2
Yuzuka Inagaki (JPN)	10^{F}
Selvi İlyasoğlu (TUR)	0

Semifinals
Alina Kasabieva (ANA)	2
Yuzuka Inagaki (JPN)	12

=== Repechage ===
Repechage round 2
Morena De Vita (ITA)	0
Irina Kuznetsova (KAZ)	10
Viktoria Vesso (EST)	2^{F}
Selvi İlyasoğlu (TUR)	0

Bronze medals
Irina Kuznetsova (KAZ)	10
Bhagyashree Fand (UWW)	6
Viktoria Vesso (EST)	0
Alina Kasabieva (ANA)	11
