= 2023 Dan Kolov & Nikola Petrov Tournament =

Dan Kolov & Nikola Petrov 2023
- Host city: Sofia, Bulgaria
- Dates: 2–5 March
- Stadium: Levski Sofia Sports Hall

Champions
- Freestyle: Iran
- Greco-Roman: Bulgaria
- Women: Japan

The 60th Dan Kolov & Nikola Petrov Tournament was a wrestling event held in Sofia, Bulgaria between 2 and 5 March 2023.

This international tournament included competition in both men's and women's freestyle wrestling and men's Greco-Roman wrestling. This tournament was held in honor of Dan Kolov who was the first European freestyle wrestling champion from Bulgaria and European and World Champion Nikola Petroff.

== Event videos ==
The event will air freely on the Bulgarian Wrestling Federation Live Youtube channel.

Broadcast
| 2 March -Qualification Mat A | 2 March -Qualification Mat B | 2 March -Qualification Mat C | 2 March -Semi-finals Mat B | 2 March -Semi-finals Mat C |
| 3 March -Qualification/Finals Mat A | 3 March -Qualification/Finals Mat B | 3 March -Qualification/Finals Mat C | | |
| 4 March -Qualification Mat A | 4 March -Qualification Mat B | 4 March -Qualification Mat C | | |
| 5 March -Finals Mat A | 5 March -Finals Mat B | 5 March -Finals Mat C | | |

== Competition schedule ==
All times are (UTC+2)

| Date | Time | Event |
|---|---|---|
| 2 March | 10:30–14:30 | Elimination rounds FS - 61,70,79, 92 kg; GR - 55,63,72,82 kg; WW - 55,59,65, 72 kg |
| 2 March | 17:00 | Opening ceremony and Semi-finals FS - 61,70,79, 92 kg; GR - 55,63,72,82 kg; WW - 55,59,65, 72 kg |
| 3 March | 10:30–14:30 | Elimination rounds FS - 57, 65, 74; GR - 87, 97, 130; WW - 62, 68, 76 kg Repechages FS - 61,70,79, 92 kg; GR - 55,63,72,82 kg; WW - 55,59,65, 72 kg |
| 3 March | 17:00 | Semi-finals FS - 57, 65, 74; GR - 87, 97, 130; WW - 62, 68, 76 kg |
| 3 March | 18:00 | Final matches and awarding ceremony: FS - 61,70,79, 92 kg; GR - 55,63,72,82 kg; WW - 55,59,65, 72 kg |
| 4 March | 10:30–14:30 | Elimination rounds FS - 86, 97, 125; GR - 60, 67, 77 kg; WW - 50, 53, 57 kg Repechages FS - 57, 65, 74; GR - 87, 97, 130; WW - 62, 68, 76 kg |
| 4 March | 17:00 | Semi-finals: FS - 86, 97, 125; GR - 60, 67, 77 kg; WW - 50, 53, 57 kg |
| 4 March | 18:00 | Final matches and awarding ceremony: FS - 57, 65, 74; GR - 87, 97, 130; WW - 62, 68, 76 kg |
| 5 March | 11:00–12:00 | Repechages FS - 86, 97, 125; GR - 60, 67, 77 kg; WW - 50, 53, 57 kg |
| 5 March | 12:00 | Final matches and awarding ceremony: FS - 86, 97, 125; GR - 60, 67, 77 kg; WW - 50, 53, 57 kg |

== Medal table ==
* Host nation (Bulgaria)

| Rank | Nation | Gold | Silver | Bronze | Total |
|---|---|---|---|---|---|
| 1 | Japan | 6 | 2 | 6 | 14 |
| 2 | Iran | 5 | 1 | 4 | 10 |
| 3 | Bulgaria* | 4 | 3 | 6 | 13 |
| 4 | Turkey | 4 | 3 | 5 | 12 |
| 5 | Azerbaijan | 2 | 1 | 1 | 4 |
| 6 | Norway | 2 | 0 | 1 | 3 |
| 7 | Kyrgyzstan | 2 | 0 | 0 | 2 |
| 8 | United States | 1 | 4 | 6 | 11 |
| 9 | Armenia | 1 | 3 | 1 | 5 |
| 10 | Romania | 1 | 0 | 1 | 2 |
| 11 | Ecuador | 1 | 0 | 0 | 1 |
| 11 | Hungary | 1 | 0 | 0 | 1 |
| 13 | Kazakhstan | 0 | 4 | 4 | 8 |
| 14 | Ukraine | 0 | 2 | 3 | 5 |
| 15 | South Korea | 0 | 2 | 1 | 3 |
| 16 | Switzerland | 0 | 1 | 2 | 3 |
| 17 | Finland | 0 | 1 | 1 | 2 |
| 17 | Poland | 0 | 1 | 1 | 2 |
| 17 | Tunisia | 0 | 1 | 1 | 2 |
| 20 | Albania | 0 | 1 | 0 | 1 |
| 21 | Argentina | 0 | 0 | 2 | 2 |
| 21 | Georgia | 0 | 0 | 2 | 2 |
| 23 | Algeria | 0 | 0 | 1 | 1 |
| 23 | Moldova | 0 | 0 | 1 | 1 |
| 23 | Netherlands | 0 | 0 | 1 | 1 |
| 23 | North Macedonia | 0 | 0 | 1 | 1 |
| 23 | Slovakia | 0 | 0 | 1 | 1 |
| Totals (27 entries) | | 30 | 30 | 53 | 113 |

== Team ranking ==
| Rank | Men's freestyle | | Men's Greco-Roman | | Women's freestyle | |
| Rank | Team | Points | Team | Points | Team | Points |
|---|---|---|---|---|---|---|
| 1 | Iran | 141 | Bulgaria | 129 | Japan | 151 |
| 2 | Turkey | 105 | Armenia | 106 | Kazakhstan | 125 |
| 3 | United States | 98 | Japan | 104 | Bulgaria | 123 |
| 4 | Bulgaria | 95 | Turkey | 89 | United States | 105 |
| 5 | Japan | 81 | Iran | 82 | Turkey | 54 |
| 6 | Georgia | 74 | Ukraine | 80 | Romania | 52 |
| 7 | Azerbaijan | 70 | Norway | 73 | Azerbaijan | 37 |
| 8 | South Korea | 61 | Kyrgyzstan | 56 | Tunisia | 35 |
| 9 | Switzerland | 41 | Poland | 49 | Ecuador | 25 |
| 10 | Moldova | 35 | Greece | 34 | Argentina | 25 |

== Medal overview ==
=== Men's freestyle ===
| Event | Gold | Silver | Bronze |
|---|---|---|---|
| 57 kg | Ahmet Duman; Turkey | Kim Sung-gwon; South Korea | Besir Alili; North Macedonia |
| 57 kg | Ahmet Duman; Turkey | Kim Sung-gwon; South Korea | Giorgi Gegelashvili; Georgia |
| 61 kg | Recep Topal; Turkey | Intigam Valizada; Azerbaijan | Georgi Vangelov; Bulgaria |
| 61 kg | Recep Topal; Turkey | Intigam Valizada; Azerbaijan | Kaisei Tanabe; Japan |
| 65 kg | Kotaro Kiyooka; Japan | Islam Dudaev; Albania | Agustín Destribats; Argentina |
| 65 kg | Kotaro Kiyooka; Japan | Islam Dudaev; Albania | Joseph McKenna; United States |
| 70 kg | Ramazan Ramazanov; Bulgaria | Servet Coşkun; Turkey | Marc Dietsche; Switzerland |
| 70 kg | Ramazan Ramazanov; Bulgaria | Servet Coşkun; Turkey | Amir Mohammad Yazdani; Iran |
| 74 kg | Murad Kuramagomedov; Hungary | Tobias Portmann; Switzerland | Otari Bagauri; Georgia |
| 74 kg | Murad Kuramagomedov; Hungary | Tobias Portmann; Switzerland | Mitchell Mesenbrink; United States |
| 79 kg | Mostafa Ghiasi; Iran | Devin Skatzka; United States | Ramazan Sarı; Turkey |
| 79 kg | Mostafa Ghiasi; Iran | Devin Skatzka; United States | Eugeniu Mihalcean; Moldova |
| 86 kg | Hadi Vafaeipour; Iran | Fatih Erdin; Turkey | Ilia Hristov; Bulgaria |
| 86 kg | Hadi Vafaeipour; Iran | Fatih Erdin; Turkey | Osman Göçen; Turkey |
| 92 kg | Arshak Mohebi; Iran | Akhmed Bataev; Bulgaria | Ibrahim Yusubov; Azerbaijan |
| 92 kg | Arshak Mohebi; Iran | Akhmed Bataev; Bulgaria | Tatsuya Shirai; Japan |
| 97 kg | Kyle Snyder; United States | Seo Ju-hwan; South Korea | Mahamed Zakariiev; Ukraine |
| 97 kg | Kyle Snyder; United States | Seo Ju-hwan; South Korea | Danyal Shariatinia; Iran |
| 125 kg | Giorgi Meshvildishvili; Azerbaijan | Mostafa Tagani; Iran | Ty Walz; United States |
| 125 kg | Giorgi Meshvildishvili; Azerbaijan | Mostafa Tagani; Iran | Jung Yei-hyun; South Korea |

=== Men's Greco-Roman ===
| Event | Gold | Silver | Bronze |
|---|---|---|---|
| 55 kg | Adem Uzun; Turkey | Rudik Mkrtchyan; Armenia | Ahmet Taşkınoğlu; Turkey |
| 55 kg | Adem Uzun; Turkey | Rudik Mkrtchyan; Armenia | Kohei Yamagiwa; Japan |
| 60 kg | Zholaman Sharshenbekov; Kyrgyzstan | Michał Tracz; Poland | Koto Gomi; Japan |
| 60 kg | Zholaman Sharshenbekov; Kyrgyzstan | Michał Tracz; Poland | Sajjad Abbaspour; Iran |
| 63 kg | Abu Muslim Amaev; Bulgaria | Hrachya Poghosyan; Armenia | Mehmet Çeker; Turkey |
| 63 kg | Abu Muslim Amaev; Bulgaria | Hrachya Poghosyan; Armenia | Komei Sawada; Japan |
| 67 kg | Slavik Galstyan; Armenia | Kyotaro Sogabe; Japan | Håvard Jørgensen; Norway |
| 67 kg | Slavik Galstyan; Armenia | Kyotaro Sogabe; Japan | Artur Politaiev; Ukraine |
| 72 kg | Shahin Badaghi; Iran | Konstantin Stas; Bulgaria | Artem Khutko; Ukraine |
| 72 kg | Shahin Badaghi; Iran | Konstantin Stas; Bulgaria | Yuga Kasugai; Japan |
| 77 kg | Akzhol Makhmudov; Kyrgyzstan | Malkhas Amoyan; Armenia | Ahmet Yılmaz; Turkey |
| 77 kg | Akzhol Makhmudov; Kyrgyzstan | Malkhas Amoyan; Armenia | Patryk Bednarz; Poland |
| 82 kg | Exauce Mukubu; Norway | Burhan Akbudak; Turkey | Rosian Dermanski; Bulgaria |
| 82 kg | Exauce Mukubu; Norway | Burhan Akbudak; Turkey | Svetoslav Nikolov; Bulgaria |
| 87 kg | Semen Novikov; Bulgaria | Yaroslav Filchakov; Ukraine | Vigen Nazaryan; Armenia |
| 87 kg | Semen Novikov; Bulgaria | Yaroslav Filchakov; Ukraine | Bachir Sid Azara; Algeria |
| 97 kg | Felix Baldauf; Norway | Vladlen Kozlyuk; Ukraine | Tyrone Sterkenburg; Netherlands |
| 97 kg | Felix Baldauf; Norway | Vladlen Kozlyuk; Ukraine | Vahid Dadkhah; Iran |
| 130 kg | Morteza Alghosi; Iran | Konsta Mäenpää; Finland | Delian Alishahi; Switzerland |
| 130 kg | Morteza Alghosi; Iran | Konsta Mäenpää; Finland | Elias Kuosmanen; Finland |

=== Women's freestyle ===
| Event | Gold | Silver | Bronze |
|---|---|---|---|
| 50 kg | Mariya Stadnik; Azerbaijan | Svetlana Ankicheva; Kazakhstan | Miglena Selishka; Bulgaria |
| 50 kg | Mariya Stadnik; Azerbaijan | Svetlana Ankicheva; Kazakhstan | Audrey Jimenez; United States |
| 53 kg | Yumi Shimono; Japan | Altyn Shagayeva; Kazakhstan | Patricia Bermúdez; Argentina |
| 55 kg | Akari Fujinami; Japan | Ainur Ashimova; Kazakhstan | Alexandra Hedrick; United States |
| 57 kg | Luisa Valverde; Ecuador | Nilufar Raimova; Kazakhstan | Evelina Nikolova; Bulgaria |
| 59 kg | Sara Natami; Japan | Michaela Beck; United States | Guldana Bekesh; Kazakhstan |
| 59 kg | Sara Natami; Japan | Michaela Beck; United States | Emma Tissina; Kazakhstan |
| 62 kg | Yuzuka Inagaki; Japan | Marwa Amri; Tunisia | Jennifer Rogers; United States |
| 65 kg | Naomi Ruike; Japan | Mimi Hristova; Bulgaria | Albina Kairgeldinova; Kazakhstan |
| 65 kg | Naomi Ruike; Japan | Mimi Hristova; Bulgaria | Khadija Jlassi; Tunisia |
| 68 kg | Yuliana Yaneva; Bulgaria | Solin Piearcy; United States | Zsuzsanna Molnár; Slovakia |
| 72 kg | Larisa Nițu; Romania | Marilyn Garcia; United States | Anastassiya Panassovich; Kazakhstan |
| 76 kg | Yasemin Adar Yiğit; Turkey | Mizuki Nagashima; Japan | Diana Vlăsceanu; Romania |

== Participating nations ==
384 wrestlers from 42 countries:

1. Albania (6)
2. Algeria (1)
3. Argentina (7)
4. Armenia (7)
5. Austria (2)
6. Azerbaijan (9)
7. Bulgaria (60)
8. Chile (1)
9. Costa Rica (1)
10. Denmark (1)
11. Ecuador (1)
12. Spain (1)
13. Estonia (4)
14. Finland (9)
15. France (4)
16. United Kingdom (1)
17. Georgia (14)
18. Greece (12)
19. Honduras (5)
20. Hungary (5)
21. Iran (15)
22. Israel (3)
23. Japan (47)
24. Kazakhstan (20)
25. Kyrgyzstan (4)
26. South Korea (6)
27. Latvia (1)
28. Lithuania (2)
29. Moldova (5)
30. North Macedonia (7)
31. Netherlands (2)
32. Norway (6)
33. Poland (17)
34. Portugal (1)
35. Romania (14)
36. Serbia (3)
37. Switzerland (10)
38. Slovakia (4)
39. Tunisia (3)
40. Turkey (23)
41. Ukraine (9)
42. United States (31)

== Results ==
Legend

- F — Won by fall
- R — Retired
- WO — Won by walkover

=== Men's freestyle ===
==== Men's freestyle 57 kg ====
Round of 16
Mehdi Rahimi (IRI) | 10
Ivaylo Tisov (BUL) | 0
Ahmet Duman (TUR) | 11
Fuga Sasaki (JPN) | 0
Mukhamed Balgabay (KAZ) | 0
Răzvan Kovacs (ROU) | 4
Richard Townsell (USA)
Taketo Ninomiya (JPN) | WO
Valentin Damour (FRA) | 9
Brandon Escobar (HON) | 4
David Almendra (ARG) | 0
Kim Sung-gwon (KOR) | 11

Quarterfinals
Besir Alili (MKD) | 4
Mehdi Rahimi (IRI) | 3
Ahmet Duman (TUR) | 7
Răzvan Kovacs (ROU) | 6
Taketo Ninomiya (JPN) | 7
Valentin Damour (FRA) | 1
Kim Sung-gwon (KOR) | 5
Giorgi Gegelashvili (GEO) | 2

Semifinals
Besir Alili (MKD) | 0
Ahmet Duman (TUR) | 11^{F}
Taketo Ninomiya (JPN) | 4
Kim Sung-gwon (KOR) | 15

Final
Ahmet Duman (TUR) | 6
Kim Sung-gwon (KOR) | 2

Repechage round 1
Fuga Sasaki (JPN) | 2
Răzvan Kovacs (ROU) | 3
David Almendra (ARG) | 0
Giorgi Gegelashvili (GEO) | 10

Bronze medal match
Răzvan Kovacs (ROU) | 3
Besir Alili (MKD) | 5
Giorgi Gegelashvili (GEO) | 12
Taketo Ninomiya (JPN) | 6

==== Men's freestyle 61 kg ====
Round of 32
| | Score | |
|---|---|---|
| Devan Turner (USA) | 0–4 | Ivaylo Tisov (BUL) |

Round of 16
Gamzatgadzsi Halidov (HUN) | 2
Georgi Vangelov (BUL) | 3
Stilyan Iliev (BUL) | 5
Kosei Shimizume (JPN) | 4
Daniel Popov (ISR) | 1
Intigam Valizada (AZE) | 5
Nathan Tomasello (USA) | 6
Nika Zakashvili (GEO) | 9
Endrio Avdyli (ALB) | 0
Giorgi Goniashvili (GEO) | 10
Recep Topal (TUR) | 3
Vladimir Egorov (MKD) | 1
Nikolai Okhlopkov (ROU) | 0
Kaisei Tanabe (JPN) | 10
Thomas Gilman (USA) | 6
Yaroslav Hurskyy (UKR) | 1

Quarterfinals
Georgi Vangelov (BUL) | 11
Stilyan Iliev (BUL) | 1
Intigam Valizada (AZE) | 3
Nika Zakashvili (GEO) | 0
Giorgi Goniashvili (GEO) | 4
Recep Topal (TUR) | 11
Kaisei Tanabe (JPN) | 11
Thomas Gilman (USA) | 1

Semifinals
Georgi Vangelov (BUL) | 1
Intigam Valizada (AZE) | 2
Recep Topal (TUR) | 13^{F}
Kaisei Tanabe (JPN) | 6

Final
Intigam Valizada (AZE) | 1
Recep Topal (TUR) | 4

Repechage round 1
Daniel Popov (ISR) | 1
Nika Zakashvili (GEO) | 3
Vladimir Egorov (MKD) | 1
Giorgi Goniashvili (GEO) | 5

Bronze medal match
Nika Zakashvili (GEO) | 4
Georgi Vangelov (BUL) | 6
Giorgi Goniashvili (GEO) | 0
Kaisei Tanabe (JPN) | 10

==== Men's freestyle 65 kg ====
Round of 32
| | Score | |
|---|---|---|
| Kotaro Kiyooka (JPN) | 14–3 | Mikyay Naim (BUL) |
| Joseph McKenna (USA) | 6–2 | Kim Chang-su (KOR) |
| Ștefan Coman (ROU) | 10–7 | Giorgi Shonia (GEO) |

Round of 16
Agustín Destribats (ARG) | 9
Vladimir Dubov (BUL) | 4
Kotaro Kiyooka (JPN) | 11
Amir-Ali Asad (IRI) | 0
Yerbol Dilmagambetov (KAZ) | 1
Marwane Yezza (FRA) | 8
Nino Leutert (SUI) | 8
Bozhidar Dzhorov (BUL) | 0
Bek Zhaqsybekov (KAZ) | 5
Aibol Tungyshbayev (KAZ) | 1
Joseph McKenna (USA) | 10
Luka Janezashvili (GEO) | 0
Islam Dudaev (ALB) | 8
Ștefan Coman (ROU) | 0
Mikheil Berdzenishvili (GEO) | 3
Kengo Uto (JPN) | 7

Quarterfinals
Agustín Destribats (ARG) | 6
Kotaro Kiyooka (JPN) | 7
Marwane Yezza (FRA) | 4
Nino Leutert (SUI) | 2
Bek Zhaqsybekov (KAZ) | 0
Joseph McKenna (USA) | 7
Islam Dudaev (ALB) | 11
Kengo Uto (JPN) | 0

Semifinals
Kotaro Kiyooka (JPN) | 6
Marwane Yezza (FRA) | 2
Joseph McKenna (USA) | 3
Islam Dudaev (ALB) | 10

Final
Kotaro Kiyooka (JPN) | 7
Islam Dudaev (ALB) | 6

Repechage round 1
Mikyay Naim (BUL)
Amir-Ali Asad (IRI) | WO

Repechage round 2
Amir-Ali Asad (IRI) | 0
Agustín Destribats (ARG) | 11
Ștefan Coman (ROU) | 5
Kengo Uto (JPN) | 2

Bronze medals
Agustín Destribats (ARG) | 11
Marwane Yezza (FRA) | 0
Ștefan Coman (ROU) | 2
Joseph McKenna (USA) | 6

==== Men's freestyle 70 kg ====
Round of 16
Seigo Nakamura (JPN) | 1
Pavel Graur (MDA) | 12
Dániel Antal (HUN) | 4
Fati Vejseli (MKD) | 3
Servet Coşkun (TUR) | 5
Marc Dietsche (SUI) | 2
~~Olzhas Olzhakanov (KAZ)~~
Ivan Stoyanov (BUL) | WO
Akaki Kemertelidze (GEO) | 1
Ramazan Ramazanov (BUL) | 8^{F}
Kaloyan Atanasov (BUL) | 2
Amir Mohammad Yazdani (IRI) | 13
Constantin Chirilov (MDA) | 6^{F}
Keiji Watanabe (JPN) | 0

Quarterfinals
Evgheni Volcov (ROU) | 2
Pavel Graur (MDA) | 2
Dániel Antal (HUN) | 0
Servet Coşkun (TUR) | 6
Ivan Stoyanov (BUL) | 1
Ramazan Ramazanov (BUL) | 12
Amir Mohammad Yazdani (IRI) | 11
Constantin Chirilov (MDA) | 0

Semifinals
Pavel Graur (MDA) | 0^{R}
Servet Coşkun (TUR) | 9
Ramazan Ramazanov (BUL) | 7
Amir Mohammad Yazdani (IRI) | 6

Final
Servet Coşkun (TUR) | 0
Ramazan Ramazanov (BUL) | 6

Repechage round 1
Marc Dietsche (SUI) | 8
Dániel Antal (HUN) | 0
Akaki Kemertelidze (GEO) | 4
Ivan Stoyanov (BUL) | 4

Bronze medal match
Marc Dietsche (SUI) | 6
Pavel Graur (MDA) | 3
Ivan Stoyanov (BUL) | 0
Amir Mohammad Yazdani (IRI) | 10

==== Men's freestyle 74 kg ====
Round of 32
| | Score | |
|---|---|---|
| Nikolay Dimitrov (BUL) | 6–3 | Dimitar Angelov (BUL) |
| Otari Bagauri (GEO) | 5–3 | Erfan Elahi (IRI) |
| Gong Byung-min (KOR) | 10–0 | León Peralta (CHI) |
| Murad Kuramagomedov (HUN) | 5–0 | Simon Marchl (AUT) |
| Szymon Wojtkowski (POL) | WO | Kamil Rybicki (POL) |

Round of 16
Petar Petkov (BUL) | 4^{F}
Lautaro Seghesso (ARG) | 1
Nikolay Dimitrov (BUL)
Miroslav Kirov (BUL) | WO
Rasul Shapiev (MKD) | 8
Otari Bagauri (GEO) | 9
Gong Byung-min (KOR) | 0
Tobias Portmann (SUI) | 2
Patryk Ołenczyn (POL)
Luis Barrios (HON) | WO
Murad Kuramagomedov (HUN) | 6
Hikaru Takata (JPN) | 4
Askar Zhengisbekov (KAZ) | 9
Kamil Rybicki (POL) | 9
Presiyan Mihov (BUL) | 0
Mitchell Mesenbrink (USA) | 11

Quarterfinals
Petar Petkov (BUL) | 0
Miroslav Kirov (BUL) | 11
Otari Bagauri (GEO) | 1
Tobias Portmann (SUI) | 2
Luis Barrios (HON) | 4
Murad Kuramagomedov (HUN) | 5
Askar Zhengisbekov (KAZ)
Mitchell Mesenbrink (USA) | WO

Semifinals
Miroslav Kirov (BUL) | 1
Tobias Portmann (SUI) | 2
Murad Kuramagomedov (HUN) | 12
Mitchell Mesenbrink (USA) | 5

Final
Tobias Portmann (SUI) | 2
Murad Kuramagomedov (HUN) | 5

Repechage round 1
Simon Marchl (AUT) | 0
Hikaru Takata (JPN) | 10

Repechage round 2
Gong Byung-min (KOR) | 1
Otari Bagauri (GEO) | 3
Hikaru Takata (JPN) | 10
Luis Barrios (HON) | 0

Bronze medal match
Otari Bagauri (GEO) | WO
Miroslav Kirov (BUL)
Hikaru Takata (JPN) | 2
Mitchell Mesenbrink (USA) | 15

==== Men's freestyle 79 kg ====
Round of 32
| | Score | |
|---|---|---|
| Muhammet Akdeniz (TUR) | 8–2 | Saifedine Alekma (FRA) |
| Achsarbek Gulajev (SVK) | 7–0 | Ahmad Magomedov (MKD) |
| Mihail Georgiev (BUL) | 1–8 | Isaiah White (USA) |
| Devin Skatzka (USA) | 5–3 | Otari Adeishvili (GEO) |

Round of 16
Maxim Vasilioglo (ROU) | 11
Kosuke Yamakura (JPN) | 1
Muhammet Akdeniz (TUR) | 0
Ramazan Sarı (TUR) | 7
Radomir Stoyanov (BUL) | 0
Achsarbek Gulajev (SVK) | 12
Mostafa Ghiasi (IRI) | 13
Csaba Vida (HUN) | 8
Eugeniu Mihalcean (MDA) | 8
Erik Reinbok (EST) | 2
Isaiah White (USA) | 1
Michael Kemerer (USA) | 3
Iakub Shikhdzamalov (ROU)
Devin Skatzka (USA) | WO
Yerkhan Abdazov (KAZ) | 16
Taiki Morito (JPN) | 6

Quarterfinals
Maxim Vasilioglo (ROU) | 2
Ramazan Sarı (TUR) | 7
Achsarbek Gulajev (SVK) | 2
Mostafa Ghiasi (IRI) | 10
Eugeniu Mihalcean (MDA) | 11
Michael Kemerer (USA) | 6
Devin Skatzka (USA) | 10
Yerkhan Abdazov (KAZ) | 0

Semifinals
Ramazan Sarı (TUR) | 0
Mostafa Ghiasi (IRI) | 6
Eugeniu Mihalcean (MDA) | 2
Devin Skatzka (USA) | 10

Final
Mostafa Ghiasi (IRI) | 9
Devin Skatzka (USA) | 2

Repechage round 1
Otari Adeishvili (GEO) | WO
Iakub Shikhdzamalov (ROU)

Repechage round 2
Csaba Vida (HUN) | 0
Achsarbek Gulajev (SVK) | 11
Otari Adeishvili (GEO) | 11
Yerkhan Abdazov (KAZ) | 10

Bronze medal match
Achsarbek Gulajev (SVK) | 4
Ramazan Sarı (TUR) | 6
Otari Adeishvili (GEO) | 0
Eugeniu Mihalcean (MDA) | 4^{F}

==== Men's freestyle 86 kg ====
Round of 32
| | Score | |
|---|---|---|
| Filip Rogut (POL) | 1–7 | Abubakr Abakarov (AZE) |
| Orkhan Abasov (AZE) | 13–5 | Quentin Perez (USA) |
| Ivars Samušonoks (LAT) | 4–10 | Andrew Morgan (USA) |
| Jorge Llano (ARG) | 0–6 Fall | Fatih Erdin (TUR) |
| Ilia Hristov (BUL) | 11–0 | Shoken Yoshida (JPN) |
| Aimar Andruse (EST) | 3–1 | Patrik Püspöki (HUN) |
| Hadi Vafaeipour (IRI) | 4–2 | Domantas Pauliuščenko (LTU) |
| Demur Megeneishvili (GEO) | 4–7 | Ruslan Valiev (FRA) |
| Cezary Sadowski (POL) | 0–10 | Yudai Takahashi (JPN) |

Round of 16
Zaur Beradze (GEO) | 2
Abubakr Abakarov (AZE) | 2
Orkhan Abasov (AZE) | 13
Andrew Morgan (USA) | 1
Angelos Kouklaris (GRE) | 0
Fatih Erdin (TUR) | 8
Ilia Hristov (BUL) | 8
Miko Elkala (FIN) | 2
Uri Kalashnikov (ISR) | 2
Aimar Andruse (EST) | 10
Hadi Vafaeipour (IRI) | 5
Stefan Reichmuth (SUI) | 0
Kim Gwan-uk (KOR) | 1
Ruslan Valiev (FRA) | 1
Yudai Takahashi (JPN) | 6
Osman Göçen (TUR) | 9

Quarterfinals
Abubakr Abakarov (AZE) | 7
Orkhan Abasov (AZE) | 0
Fatih Erdin (TUR) | 6
Ilia Hristov (BUL) | 0
Aimar Andruse (EST) | 0
Hadi Vafaeipour (IRI) | 10
Kim Gwan-uk (KOR) | 12
Osman Göçen (TUR) | 13

Semifinals
Abubakr Abakarov (AZE) | 0^{R}
Fatih Erdin (TUR) | 8
Hadi Vafaeipour (IRI) | 10
Osman Göçen (TUR) | 0

Final
Fatih Erdin (TUR) | 1
Hadi Vafaeipour (IRI) | 1

Repechage round 1
Jorge Llano (ARG) | 1
Angelos Kouklaris (GRE) | 3
Domantas Pauliuščenko (LTU) | 0
Stefan Reichmuth (SUI) | 4

Repechage round 2
Angelos Kouklaris (GRE) | 0
Ilia Hristov (BUL) | 3
Stefan Reichmuth (SUI) | 3
Aimar Andruse (EST) | 5

Bronze medal match
Ilia Hristov (BUL) | WO
Abubakr Abakarov (AZE)
Aimar Andruse (EST) | 0
Osman Göçen (TUR) | 10

==== Men's freestyle 92 kg ====
Round of 16
Ibrahim Yusubov (AZE) | 7
Denys Sahaliuk (UKR) | 2
Taiki Nagatomo (JPN) | 0
Andrian Grosul (MDA) | 4^{F}
Arshak Mohebi (IRI) | 10
Bogomil Bonev (BUL) | 0
Tatsuya Shirai (JPN) | 4
Sali Saliev (BUL) | 0

Quarterfinals
Akhmed Bataev (BUL) | 7
Ibrahim Yusubov (AZE) | 3
Andrian Grosul (MDA) | 10
Ivan Nedealco (MDA) | 0
Evelin Rusev (BUL) | 0
Arshak Mohebi (IRI) | 10
Tatsuya Shirai (JPN) | 2
Dato Piruzashvili (GEO) | 1

Semifinals
Akhmed Bataev (BUL) | 9
Andrian Grosul (MDA) | 2
Arshak Mohebi (IRI) | 7
Tatsuya Shirai (JPN) | 0

Final
Akhmed Bataev (BUL) | 4
Arshak Mohebi (IRI) | 6

Repechage round 1
Bogomil Bonev (BUL) | WO
Evelin Rusev (BUL)

Bronze medal match
Ibrahim Yusubov (AZE) | 6
Andrian Grosul (MDA) | 1
Bogomil Bonev (BUL) | 3
Tatsuya Shirai (JPN) | 7

==== Men's freestyle 97 kg ====
Round of 32
| | Score | |
|---|---|---|
| Mamuka Kordzaia (GEO) | 10–0 | Daiki Chiba (JPN) |
| Samuel Scherrer (SUI) | 1–4 | Nursultan Azov (KAZ) |
| Ricardo Báez (ARG) | 13–2 | Kolyo Dimitrov (BUL) |
| Daniil Pidlypenets (UKR) | 9–0 | George Sikes (USA) |

Round of 16
Erhan Yaylacı (TUR) | 4
Mahamed Zakariiev (UKR) | 11^{F}
Mamuka Kordzaia (GEO) | 8
Maxwell Lacey (CRC) | 0
Georgi Dimitrov (BUL) | 2
Nursultan Azov (KAZ) | 6
Seo Ju-hwan (KOR) | 7
Hibiki Ito (JPN) | 2
Danyal Shariatinia (IRI) | 10
Lukas Krasauskas (LTU) | 0
Ricardo Báez (ARG) | 2
Magomedgaji Nurov (MKD) | 8
Kyle Snyder (USA) | 10
Daniil Pidlypenets (UKR) | 0
Juho Ruusila (FIN) | WO
~~Batyrbek Tsakulov (SVK)~~

Quarterfinals
Mahamed Zakariiev (UKR) | 8
Mamuka Kordzaia (GEO) | 0
Nursultan Azov (KAZ) | 1
Seo Ju-hwan (KOR) | 3
Danyal Shariatinia (IRI) | 8^{F}
Magomedgaji Nurov (MKD) | 0
Kyle Snyder (USA) | 10
Juho Ruusila (FIN) | 0

Semifinals
Mahamed Zakariiev (UKR) | 1
Seo Ju-hwan (KOR) | 3
Danyal Shariatinia (IRI) | 4
Kyle Snyder (USA) | 14

Final
Seo Ju-hwan (KOR) | 1
Kyle Snyder (USA) | 12

Repechage round 1
Hibiki Ito (JPN) | 1
Nursultan Azov (KAZ) | 9
Daniil Pidlypenets (UKR) | 4
Juho Ruusila (FIN) | 0

Bronze medal match
Nursultan Azov (KAZ) | 2
Mahamed Zakariiev (UKR) | 7^{F}
Daniil Pidlypenets (UKR) | 0
Danyal Shariatinia (IRI) | 10

==== Men's freestyle 125 kg ====
Round of 16
Johannes Ludescher (AUT) | 0
Ty Walz (USA) | 8
Mostafa Tagani (IRI) | 11^{F}
Jung Yei-hyun (KOR) | 0
Jakub Czerczak (POL) | 0
Georgi Ivanov (BUL) | 10

Quarterfinals
Giga Shavadze (GEO) | 0
Ty Walz (USA) | 6
Giorgi Meshvildishvili (AZE) | 10
Rahid Hamidli (AZE) | 0
Paris Karepi (ALB) | 0
Mostafa Tagani (IRI) | 10
Georgi Ivanov (BUL) | 11^{F}
Kai Shutto (JPN) | 0

Semifinals
Ty Walz (USA) | 0
Giorgi Meshvildishvili (AZE) | 11
Mostafa Tagani (IRI) | 11
Georgi Ivanov (BUL) | 8

Final
Giorgi Meshvildishvili (AZE) | 7
Mostafa Tagani (IRI) | 2

Repechage round 1
Jung Yei-hyun (KOR) | 2
Paris Karepi (ALB) | 1

Bronze medal match
Rahid Hamidli (AZE) | 1
Ty Walz (USA) | 3
Jung Yei-hyun (KOR) | 9
Georgi Ivanov (BUL) | 7

=== Men's Greco-Roman ===
==== Men's Greco-Roman 55 kg ====
Round of 16
Paolo Milkov (BUL) | 0
Rudik Mkrtchyan (ARM) | 8
Shogo Numata (JPN) | 0
Kohei Yamagiwa (JPN) | 10

Quarterfinals
Ahmet Taşkınoğlu (TUR) | 0
Rudik Mkrtchyan (ARM) | 5
Stefan Grigorov (BUL) | 0
Mizuki Araki (JPN) | 11
Bajram Sina (ALB) | 0
Adem Uzun (TUR) | 9
Kohei Yamagiwa (JPN) | 12
Ilias Zairakis (GRE) | 1

Semifinals
Rudik Mkrtchyan (ARM) | 13
Mizuki Araki (JPN) | 9
Adem Uzun (TUR) | 9
Kohei Yamagiwa (JPN) | 3

Final
Rudik Mkrtchyan (ARM) | 2
Adem Uzun (TUR) | 3

Repechage round 1
Paolo Milkov (BUL) | 4
Ahmet Taşkınoğlu (TUR) | 12

Bronze medal match
Ahmet Taşkınoğlu (TUR) | 5
Mizuki Araki (JPN) | 2
Bajram Sina (ALB) | 2
Kohei Yamagiwa (JPN) | 10

==== Men's Greco-Roman 60 kg ====
Round of 16
Koto Gomi (JPN) | 14
Kurama Fujimoto (JPN) | 6
Sajjad Abbaspour (IRI) | 10
Martin Velev (BUL) | 2
Nedyalko Petrov (BUL) | 0
Zholaman Sharshenbekov (KGZ) | 9

Quarterfinals
Mateusz Szewczuk (POL) | 0
Koto Gomi (JPN) | 9
Michał Tracz (POL) | 9
Ryder Smith (USA) | 0
Helary Mägisalu (EST) | 1
Sajjad Abbaspour (IRI) | 8
Zholaman Sharshenbekov (KGZ) | 9
Gabe Townsell (USA) | 0

Semifinals
Koto Gomi (JPN) | 0
Michał Tracz (POL) | 10
Sajjad Abbaspour (IRI) | 2
Zholaman Sharshenbekov (KGZ) | 10

Final
Michał Tracz (POL) | 0
Zholaman Sharshenbekov (KGZ) | 6^{F}

Repechage round 1
Nedyalko Petrov (BUL) | WO
Gabe Townsell (USA)

Bronze medal match
Ryder Smith (USA) | 0
Koto Gomi (JPN) | 8
Nedyalko Petrov (BUL) | 1
Sajjad Abbaspour (IRI) | 3

==== Men's Greco-Roman 63 kg ====
Round of 16
Răzvan Arnăut (ROU) | 2
Abdurrahman Altan (TUR) | 3

Quarterfinals
Jurgen Uku (ALB) | 0
Abdurrahman Altan (TUR) | 8
Abu Muslim Amaev (BUL) | 6
Mehmet Çeker (TUR) | 5
Aidan Nutter (USA) | 7
Koki Yoshinaga (JPN) | 1
Hrachya Poghosyan (ARM) | 5
Komei Sawada (JPN) | 1

Semifinals
Abdurrahman Altan (TUR) | 0
Abu Muslim Amaev (BUL) | 5
Aidan Nutter (USA) | 0
Hrachya Poghosyan (ARM) | 9

Final
Abu Muslim Amaev (BUL) | 5
Hrachya Poghosyan (ARM) | 0

Bronze medal match
Mehmet Çeker (TUR) | 1
Abdurrahman Altan (TUR) | 1
Komei Sawada (JPN) | 5
Aidan Nutter (USA) | 1

==== Men's Greco-Roman 67 kg ====
Round of 32
| | Score | |
|---|---|---|
| Deyvid Dimitrov (BUL) | 6–4 | Andreas Vetsch (SUI) |
| Mihai Mihuț (ROU) | 1–10 | Kyotaro Sogabe (JPN) |
| Soshi Nagano (JPN) | 0–8 | Håvard Jørgensen (NOR) |
| Morten Thoresen (NOR) | 6–0 | David Stepanian (USA) |
| Charles Welcome (USA) | 0–8 | Slavik Galstyan (ARM) |

Round of 16
Mateusz Bernatek (POL) | 1
Elmer Mattila (FIN) | 2
Deyvid Dimitrov (BUL) | 2
Hacı Karakuş (TUR) | 6
Roman Pacurkowski (POL) | 0
Kyotaro Sogabe (JPN) | 12
Håvard Jørgensen (NOR) | 9
Amantur Ismailov (KGZ) | 0
Pedro Caldas (POR) | 4
Furkan Yıldız (TUR) | 13
Morten Thoresen (NOR) | 7
Nikalas Sulev (BUL) | 1
Artur Politaiev (UKR) | 4
Slavik Galstyan (ARM) | 6
Piotr Stolarczyk (POL) | 3
Nikolay Vichev (BUL) | 6

Quarterfinals
Elmer Mattila (FIN) | 2
Hacı Karakuş (TUR) | 5
Kyotaro Sogabe (JPN) | 9^{F}
Håvard Jørgensen (NOR) | 3
Furkan Yıldız (TUR) | 5
Morten Thoresen (NOR) | 5
Slavik Galstyan (ARM) | 6
Nikolay Vichev (BUL) | 0

Semifinals
Hacı Karakuş (TUR) | 1
Kyotaro Sogabe (JPN) | 5
Furkan Yıldız (TUR) | 5
Slavik Galstyan (ARM) | 9

Final
Kyotaro Sogabe (JPN) | 6
Slavik Galstyan (ARM) | 9

Repechage round 1
Mihai Mihuț (ROU) | 2
Roman Pacurkowski (POL) | 1
Charles Welcome (USA) | 0
Artur Politaiev (UKR) | 9

Repechage round 2
Mihai Mihuț (ROU) | 0
Håvard Jørgensen (NOR) | 8
Artur Politaiev (UKR) | 5
Nikolay Vichev (BUL) | 1

Bronze medals
Håvard Jørgensen (NOR) | 5
Hacı Karakuş (TUR) | 1
Artur Politaiev (UKR) | 5^{F}
Furkan Yıldız (TUR) | 0

==== Men's Greco-Roman 72 kg ====
Round of 16
Konstantin Stas (BUL) | 7
Oliver Oláh (SVK) | 2
Yuga Kasugai (JPN) | 9
Kevin Kupi (ALB) | 0

Quarterfinals
Artem Khutko (UKR) | 1
Konstantin Stas (BUL) | 9
Kaiya Yoshida (JPN) | WO
~~Aleksa Erski (SRB)~~
Florin Cozma (ROU) | 0
Shahin Badaghi (IRI) | 8
Yuga Kasugai (JPN) | 8
Matias Lipasti (FIN) | 0

Semifinals
Konstantin Stas (BUL) | 10
Kaiya Yoshida (JPN) | 0
Shahin Badaghi (IRI) | 10
Yuga Kasugai (JPN) | 1

Final
Konstantin Stas (BUL) | 2
Shahin Badaghi (IRI) | 5

Repechage round 1
Oliver Oláh (SVK) | 1
Artem Khutko (UKR) | 11

Bronze medal match
Artem Khutko (UKR) | 8
Kaiya Yoshida (JPN) | 0
Florin Cozma (ROU) | 0
Yuga Kasugai (JPN) | 9

==== Men's Greco-Roman 77 kg ====
Round of 32
| | Score | |
|---|---|---|
| Shu Yamada (JPN) | 1–11 | Malkhas Amoyan (ARM) |
| Akseli Yli-Hannuksela (FIN) | WO | Michael Higgins (USA) |
| Zhoro Dobrev (BUL) | 0–8 | Oliver Krüger (DEN) |
| Juan Sebastian Aak (NOR) | 1–6 | Akzhol Makhmudov (KGZ) |
| Zlatomir Emilov (BUL) | 4–4 | Riley Briggs (USA) |

Round of 16
Maksym Zakharchuk (POL) | 0
Ahmet Yılmaz (TUR) | 9
Malkhas Amoyan (ARM) | 5
Alireza Arghash (IRI) | 5
Elmar Nuraliev (UKR) | 9
Michael Higgins (USA) | 0
Oliver Krüger (DEN) | 9^{F}
Andreas Vasilakopoulos (GRE) | 0
Patryk Bednarz (POL) | 4
Riki Kakemizu (JPN) | 0
Akzhol Makhmudov (KGZ) | 9
Christos Koutsouridis (GRE) | 0
Nicolaos Ignătescu (ROU) | 9
Zlatomir Emilov (BUL) | 2
Mikko Peltokangas (FIN) | 2
Per-Anders Kure (NOR) | 4

Quarterfinals
Ahmet Yılmaz (TUR) | 3
Malkhas Amoyan (ARM) | 9
Elmar Nuraliev (UKR) | 8
Oliver Krüger (DEN) | 0
Patryk Bednarz (POL) | 0
Akzhol Makhmudov (KGZ) | 10
Nicolaos Ignătescu (ROU) | 1
Per-Anders Kure (NOR) | 5

Semifinals
Malkhas Amoyan (ARM) | 6
Elmar Nuraliev (UKR) | 1
Akzhol Makhmudov (KGZ) | 2
Per-Anders Kure (NOR) | 0^{R}

Final
Malkhas Amoyan (ARM) | 1
Akzhol Makhmudov (KGZ) | 1

Repechage round 1
Shu Yamada (JPN) | WO
~~Alireza Arghash (IRI)~~
Juan Sebastian Aak (NOR) | 8^{F}
Christos Koutsouridis (GRE) | 0

Repechage round 2
Shu Yamada (JPN) | 0
Ahmet Yılmaz (TUR) | 8
Juan Sebastian Aak (NOR) | 8
Patryk Bednarz (POL) | 16

Bronze medal match
Ahmet Yılmaz (TUR) | 5
Elmar Nuraliev (UKR) | 4
Patryk Bednarz (POL) | WO
~~Per-Anders Kure (NOR)~~

==== Men's Greco-Roman 82 kg ====
Round of 16
Daizo Tanizaki (JPN) | 0
Burhan Akbudak (TUR) | 9
Rosian Dermanski (BUL) | 9
David Hallett (USA) | 0
Yumeto Aoyama (JPN) | 3
Michael Altomer (USA) | 6^{F}
Ilias Pagkalidis (GRE) | 6
Marc Weber (SUI) | 0
Karapet Chalyan (ARM) | 1
Samvel Grigoryan (ARM) | 2

Quarterfinals
Ranet Kaljola (EST) | 0
Burhan Akbudak (TUR) | 9
Rosian Dermanski (BUL) | 8
Michael Altomer (USA) | 0
Exauce Mukubu (NOR) | 5
Ilias Pagkalidis (GRE) | 2
Samvel Grigoryan (ARM) | 2
Svetoslav Nikolov (BUL) | 7

Semifinals
Burhan Akbudak (TUR) | 3^{F}
Rosian Dermanski (BUL) | 3
Exauce Mukubu (NOR) | 10
Svetoslav Nikolov (BUL) | 10

Final
Burhan Akbudak (TUR)
Exauce Mukubu (NOR) | WO

Repechage round 1
Daizo Tanizaki (JPN)
Ranet Kaljola (EST) | WO

Bronze medal match
Ranet Kaljola (EST) | 0
Rosian Dermanski (BUL) | 6
Ilias Pagkalidis (GRE) | 6
Svetoslav Nikolov (BUL) | 8

==== Men's Greco-Roman 87 kg ====
Round of 32
| | Score | |
|---|---|---|
| Nikola Simović (SRB) | 3–12 | Dimitrios Papadopoulos (GRE) |

Round of 16
Ramon Betschart (SUI) | 0
Semen Novikov (BUL) | 11
Dimitrios Papadopoulos (GRE) | 10
Yuya Obi (JPN) | 0
Vigen Nazaryan (ARM) | 6
Marcel Sterkenburg (NED) | 0
Arkadiusz Kułynycz (POL) | 7
Ariel Alfonso (HON) | 1
Theodoros Tsardas (GRE) | 1
Bachir Sid Azara (ALG) | 10
Szymon Szymonowicz (POL) | 1
Saeid Karimizadeh (IRI) | 5
Kaito Miyamoto (JPN) | WO
~~George Sikes (USA)~~
Christos Terzidis (GRE) | 0
Yaroslav Filchakov (UKR) | 5

Quarterfinals
Semen Novikov (BUL) | 8
Dimitrios Papadopoulos (GRE) | 0
Vigen Nazaryan (ARM) | 5
Arkadiusz Kułynycz (POL) | 2
Bachir Sid Azara (ALG) | 3
Saeid Karimizadeh (IRI) | 1
Kaito Miyamoto (JPN) | 1
Yaroslav Filchakov (UKR) | 5

Semifinals
Semen Novikov (BUL) | 3
Vigen Nazaryan (ARM) | 1
Bachir Sid Azara (ALG) | 1
Yaroslav Filchakov (UKR) | 2

Final
Semen Novikov (BUL) | 7
Yaroslav Filchakov (UKR) | 3

Repechage round 1
Ramon Betschart (SUI) | 3
Dimitrios Papadopoulos (GRE) | 1
Christos Terzidis (GRE) | 9
Kaito Miyamoto (JPN) | 0

Bronze medal match
Ramon Betschart (SUI) | 1
Vigen Nazaryan (ARM) | 1
Christos Terzidis (GRE) | 1
Bachir Sid Azara (ALG) | 10

==== Men's Greco-Roman 97 kg ====
Round of 16
Laokratis Kesidis (GRE) | 9^{F}
Ibuki Okuda (JPN) | 0
Aleksandar Simović (SRB) | 0
Vladlen Kozlyuk (UKR) | 4^{F}
Tyrone Sterkenburg (NED) | 9
Spyridon Kountouratzis (GRE) | 1
Borislav Vasilev (BUL) | 1
Gerard Kurniczak (POL) | 10
Daisho Kato (JPN) | 2
Felix Baldauf (NOR) | 8^{F}
Vahid Dadkhah (IRI) | 9
Anestis Zarifes (GRE) | 0
Uzur Dzhuzupbekov (KGZ) | 5
Beytullah Kayışdağ (TUR) | 0

Quarterfinals
Kiril Milov (BUL) | 9
Laokratis Kesidis (GRE) | 1
Vladlen Kozlyuk (UKR) | 3
Tyrone Sterkenburg (NED) | 1
Gerard Kurniczak (POL) | 4
Felix Baldauf (NOR) | 7
Vahid Dadkhah (IRI) | 8
Uzur Dzhuzupbekov (KGZ) | 5

Semifinals
Kiril Milov (BUL) | 0
Vladlen Kozlyuk (UKR) | 9
Felix Baldauf (NOR) | 15
Vahid Dadkhah (IRI) | 6

Final
Vladlen Kozlyuk (UKR) | 2
Felix Baldauf (NOR) | 3

Repechage round 1
~~Aleksandar Simović (SRB)~~
Tyrone Sterkenburg (NED) | WO
Daisho Kato (JPN) | 3
Gerard Kurniczak (POL) | 14

Bronze medal match
Tyrone Sterkenburg (NED) | WO
Kiril Milov (BUL)
Gerard Kurniczak (POL) | 3
Vahid Dadkhah (IRI) | 4

==== Men's Greco-Roman 130 kg ====
Round of 16
Morteza Alghosi (IRI) | 10
Shion Obata (JPN) | 1
Konsta Mäenpää (FIN) | 7
Gino Ávila (HON) | 3
Alin Alexuc-Ciurariu (ROU) | 3
Fatih Bozkurt (TUR) | 1

Quarterfinals
Delian Alishahi (SUI) | 1
Morteza Alghosi (IRI) | 3
Mariyan Marinov (BUL) | WO
Rafał Krajewski (POL)
Takato Sasaoka (JPN) | 0
Konsta Mäenpää (FIN) | 8
Alin Alexuc-Ciurariu (ROU) | 1
Elias Kuosmanen (FIN) | 2

Semifinals
Morteza Alghosi (IRI) | 12
Mariyan Marinov (BUL) | 6
Konsta Mäenpää (FIN) | 3
Elias Kuosmanen (FIN) | 2

Final
Morteza Alghosi (IRI) | 4
Konsta Mäenpää (FIN) | 3

Repechage round 1
Shion Obata (JPN) | 1
Delian Alishahi (SUI) | 3
Gino Ávila (HON) | 3
Takato Sasaoka (JPN) | 1

Bronze medal match
Delian Alishahi (SUI) | 6
Mariyan Marinov (BUL) | 1
Gino Ávila (HON)
Elias Kuosmanen (FIN) | WO

=== Women's freestyle ===
==== Women's freestyle 50 kg ====
Round of 16
Miglena Selishka (BUL) | 4
Turkan Nasirova (AZE) | 2
Minoriho Yonehara (JPN) | 10
Dimitrina Kyoseva (BUL) | 0
Veronika Ryabovolova (MKD) | 6
Sarra Hamdi (TUN) | 0
Ellada Makhyaddinova (KAZ) | 10
Svenja Jungo (SUI) | 12
Aintzane Gorría (ESP) | 12^{F}
Emine Osman (BUL) | 4
Svetlana Ankicheva (KAZ) | 10
Emine Çataloğlu (TUR) | 0

Quarterfinals
Mariya Stadnik (AZE) | 10
Miglena Selishka (BUL) | 0
Minoriho Yonehara (JPN) | 2
Veronika Ryabovolova (MKD) | 4^{F}
Svenja Jungo (SUI) | 4^{F}
Aintzane Gorría (ESP) | 0
Svetlana Ankicheva (KAZ) | 10
Audrey Jimenez (USA) | 8

Semifinals
Mariya Stadnik (AZE) | 10
Veronika Ryabovolova (MKD) | 0
Svenja Jungo (SUI) | 7
Svetlana Ankicheva (KAZ) | 12

Final
Mariya Stadnik (AZE) | 10
Svetlana Ankicheva (KAZ) | 0

Repechage round 1
Emine Çataloğlu (TUR) | 0
Audrey Jimenez (USA) | 10

Bronze medal match
Miglena Selishka (BUL) | 5^{F}
Veronika Ryabovolova (MKD) | 0
Audrey Jimenez (USA) | 12
Svenja Jungo (SUI) | 2

==== Women's freestyle 53 kg ====
| Pos | Athlete | Pld | W | L | CP | TP | JPN | KAZ | BUL | GRE |
|---|---|---|---|---|---|---|---|---|---|---|
| 1 | Yumi Shimono (JPN) | 3 | 3 | 0 | 15 | 18 | — | 8–0 Fall | 6–0 Fall | 4–0 Fall |
| 2 | Ayazhan Markasheva (KAZ) | 3 | 2 | 1 | 10 | 8 | 0–5 VFA | — | 6–0 Fall | 2–0 Fall |
| 3 | Mihaela Mihova (BUL) | 3 | 1 | 2 | 5 | 5 | 0–5 VFA | 0–5 VFA | — | 5–0 Fall |
| 4 | Aikaterini Vekri (GRE) | 3 | 0 | 3 | 0 | 0 | 0–5 VFA | 0–5 VFA | 0–5 VFA | — |

Source: UWW

| Pos | Athlete | Pld | W | L | CP | TP | KAZ | ARG | BUL |
|---|---|---|---|---|---|---|---|---|---|
| 1 | Altyn Shagayeva (KAZ) | 2 | 2 | 0 | 9 | 17 | — | 10–0 | 7–0 Fall |
| 2 | Patricia Bermúdez (ARG) | 2 | 1 | 1 | 3 | 8 | 0–4 VSU | — | 8–0 |
| 3 | Yana Dimitrova (BUL) | 2 | 0 | 2 | 0 | 0 | 0–5 VFA | 0–3 VPO | — |

Source: UWW

Semifinals
Yumi Shimono (JPN) | 8
Patricia Bermúdez (ARG) | 4
Altyn Shagayeva (KAZ) | 5
Ayazhan Markasheva (KAZ) | 0

Final
Yumi Shimono (JPN) | 6
Altyn Shagayeva (KAZ) | 0
Bronze medal
Patricia Bermúdez (ARG) | 10^{F}
Ayazhan Markasheva (KAZ) | 7

==== Women's freestyle 55 kg ====
| Pos | Athlete | Pld | W | L | CP | TP | JPN | USA | KAZ | BUL |
|---|---|---|---|---|---|---|---|---|---|---|
| 1 | Akari Fujinami (JPN) | 3 | 3 | 0 | 12 | 30 | — | 10–0 | 10–0 | 10–0 |
| 2 | Alexandra Hedrick (USA) | 3 | 2 | 1 | 7 | 12 | 0–4 VSU | — | 2–1 | 10–0 |
| 3 | Aisha Ualishan (KAZ) | 3 | 1 | 2 | 5 | 11 | 0–4 VSU | 1–3 VPO1 | — | 10–0 |
| 4 | Nazife Tair (BUL) | 3 | 0 | 3 | 0 | 70 | 0–4 VSU | 0–4 VSU | 0–4 VSU | — |

Source: UWW

| Pos | Athlete | Pld | W | L | CP | TP | KAZ | ROU | BUL |
|---|---|---|---|---|---|---|---|---|---|
| 1 | Ainur Ashimova (KAZ) | 2 | 2 | 0 | 7 | 16 | — | 6–2 | 10–0 |
| 2 | Elena Ionescu (ROU) | 2 | 1 | 1 | 5 | 14 | 1–3 VPO1 | — | 12–1 |
| 3 | Irena Binkova (BUL) | 2 | 0 | 2 | 1 | 1 | 0–4 VSU | 1–4 VSU1 | — |

Source: UWW

Semifinals
Akari Fujinami (JPN) | 8^{F}
Elena Ionescu (ROU) | 0
Ainur Ashimova (KAZ) | 9
Alexandra Hedrick (USA) | 8

Final
Akari Fujinami (JPN) | 4^{F}
Ainur Ashimova (KAZ) | 0
Bronze medal
Elena Ionescu (ROU) | 0
Alexandra Hedrick (USA) | 10

==== Women's freestyle 57 kg ====
| Pos | Athlete | Pld | W | L | CP | TP | ECU | JPN | FIN | TUR |
|---|---|---|---|---|---|---|---|---|---|---|
| 1 | Luisa Valverde (ECU) | 3 | 3 | 0 | 13 | 21 | — | 8–7 | 7–2 Fall | 6–0 Fall |
| 2 | Natsuki Yamaguchi (JPN) | 3 | 2 | 1 | 10 | 23 | 1–3 VPO1 | — | 10–0 | 6–5 Fall |
| 3 | Jenna Hemiä (FIN) | 3 | 1 | 2 | 5 | 8 | 0–5 VFA | 0–4 VSU | — | 6–2 Fall |
| 4 | Şevval Çayır (TUR) | 3 | 0 | 3 | 0 | 7 | 0–5 VFA | 0–5 VFA | 0–5 VFA | — |

Source: UWW

| Pos | Athlete | Pld | W | L | CP | TP | KAZ | BUL | ARG |
|---|---|---|---|---|---|---|---|---|---|
| 1 | Nilufar Raimova (KAZ) | 2 | 2 | 0 | 6 | 15 | — | 10–6 | 5–2 |
| 2 | Evelina Nikolova (BUL) | 2 | 1 | 1 | 6 | 10 | 1–3 VPO1 | — | 4–4 Fall |
| 3 | Camila Amarilla (ARG) | 2 | 0 | 2 | 1 | 6 | 1–3 VPO1 | 0–5 VFA | — |

Source: UWW

Semifinals
Luisa Valverde (ECU) | 10
Evelina Nikolova (BUL) | 1
Nilufar Raimova (KAZ) | WO
~~Natsuki Yamaguchi (JPN)~~

Final
Luisa Valverde (ECU) | 8
Nilufar Raimova (KAZ) | 7
Bronze medal
Evelina Nikolova (BUL) | WO
~~Natsuki Yamaguchi (JPN)~~

==== Women's freestyle 59 kg ====
| Quarterfinals | | Semifinals | | Final |
| Sara Natami (JPN) | 8^{F} |
| Raya Kyoseva (BUL) | 0 | Sara Natami (JPN) | 12 |
| Guldana Bekesh (KAZ) | 6^{F} | Guldana Bekesh (KAZ) | 2 |
| Kelsey Barnes (GBR) | 0 | | | Sara Natami (JPN) | 11 |
| Michaela Beck (USA) | 14 | | | Michaela Beck (USA) | 0 |
| Fatme Shaban (BUL) | 4 | Michaela Beck (USA) | 11 |
| Eda Tekin (TUR) | 1 | Emma Tissina (KAZ) | 0 |
| Emma Tissina (KAZ) | 2 |

Bronze medals
Raya Kyoseva (BUL) | 0
Guldana Bekesh (KAZ) | 5^{F}
Fatme Shaban (BUL) | 0
Emma Tissina (KAZ) | 10

==== Women's freestyle 62 kg ====
| Pos | Athlete | Pld | W | L | CP | TP | USA | AZE | USA |
|---|---|---|---|---|---|---|---|---|---|
| 1 | Jennifer Rogers (USA) | 2 | 2 | 0 | 7 | 20 | — | 9–4 | 11–0 |
| 2 | Elis Manolova (AZE) | 2 | 1 | 1 | 4 | 7 | 1–3 VPO1 | — | 3–0 |
| 3 | Janida Garcia (USA) | 2 | 0 | 2 | 0 | 0 | 0–4 VSU | 0–3 VPO | — |

Source: UWW

| Pos | Athlete | Pld | W | L | CP | TP | JPN | TUN | BUL |
|---|---|---|---|---|---|---|---|---|---|
| 1 | Yuzuka Inagaki (JPN) | 2 | 2 | 0 | 8 | 7 | — | 3–2 | 4–0 Fall |
| 2 | Marwa Amri (TUN) | 2 | 1 | 1 | 5 | 12 | 1–3 VPO1 | — | 10–0 |
| 3 | Viktoria Ivanova (BUL) | 2 | 0 | 2 | 1 | 0 | 0–5 VFA | 0–4 VSU | — |

Source: UWW

Semifinals
Jennifer Rogers (USA) | 2
Marwa Amri (TUN) | 12
Yuzuka Inagaki (JPN) | 6
Elis Manolova (AZE) | 0

Final
Marwa Amri (TUN) | 2
Yuzuka Inagaki (JPN) | 4
Bronze medal
Jennifer Rogers (USA) | 6
Elis Manolova (AZE) | 5

==== Women's freestyle 65 kg ====
| Quarterfinals | | Semifinals | | Final |
| Mimi Hristova (BUL) | WO |
| Dzhanan Manolova (BUL) | | Mimi Hristova (BUL) | 10 |
| Mima Taneva (BUL) | 4 | Albina Kairgeldinova (KAZ) | 0 |
| Albina Kairgeldinova (KAZ) | 14 | | | Mimi Hristova (BUL) | 1 |
| Khadija Jlassi (TUN) | 2 | | | Naomi Ruike (JPN) | 2 |
| Naomi Ruike (JPN) | 12 | Naomi Ruike (JPN) | 10^{F} |
| Gergana Stoyanova (BUL) | 4 | Dariga Aben (KAZ) | 0 |
| Dariga Aben (KAZ) | 8 |

Bronze medals
Dzhanan Manolova (BUL)
Albina Kairgeldinova (KAZ) | WO
Khadija Jlassi (TUN) | 9
Dariga Aben (KAZ) | 8

==== Women's freestyle 68 kg ====
| Pos | Athlete | Pld | W | L | CP | TP | USA | BUL | HON |
|---|---|---|---|---|---|---|---|---|---|
| 1 | Solin Piearcy (USA) | 2 | 2 | 0 | 9 | 10 | — | 10–0 | WO |
| 2 | Daniela Brasnarova (BUL) | 2 | 1 | 1 | 5 | 0 | 0–4 VSU | — | WO |
| 3 | Saidy Chávez (HON) | 2 | 0 | 2 | 0 | 0 | 0–5 VIN | 0–5 VIN | — |

Source: UWW

| Pos | Athlete | Pld | W | L | CP | TP | BUL | SVK | BUL |
|---|---|---|---|---|---|---|---|---|---|
| 1 | Yuliana Yaneva (BUL) | 2 | 2 | 0 | 8 | 7 | — | 7–2 | WO |
| 2 | Zsuzsanna Molnár (SVK) | 2 | 1 | 1 | 6 | 2 | 1–3 VPO1 | — | WO |
| — | Sofiya Georgieva (BUL) | 2 | 0 | 2 | 0 | 0 | 0–5 VFO | 0–5 VFO | — |

Source: UWW

Semifinals
Solin Piearcy (USA) | 10
Zsuzsanna Molnár (SVK) | 0
Yuliana Yaneva (BUL) | 10
Daniela Brasnarova (BUL) | 0

Final
Solin Piearcy (USA) | 1
Yuliana Yaneva (BUL) | 8
Bronze medal
Zsuzsanna Molnár (SVK) | 4^{F}
Daniela Brasnarova (BUL) | 0

==== Women's freestyle 72 kg ====
| Pos | Athlete | Pld | W | L | CP | TP | KAZ | TUR | BUL |
|---|---|---|---|---|---|---|---|---|---|
| 1 | Anastassiya Panassovich (KAZ) | 2 | 2 | 0 | 8 | 16 | — | 11–0 Fall | 5–0 |
| 2 | Bükrenaz Sert (TUR) | 2 | 1 | 1 | 3 | 6 | 0–5 VFA | — | 6–4 |
| 3 | Vanesa Georgieva (BUL) | 2 | 0 | 2 | 1 | 4 | 0–3 VPO | 1–3 VPO1 | — |

Source: UWW

| Pos | Athlete | Pld | W | L | CP | TP | ROU | USA | ISR |
|---|---|---|---|---|---|---|---|---|---|
| 1 | Larisa Nițu (ROU) | 2 | 1 | 1 | 5 | 23 | — | 6–10 | 17–7 |
| 2 | Marilyn Garcia (USA) | 2 | 1 | 1 | 4 | 0 | 3–1 VPO1 | — | 4–4 |
| 3 | Ilana Kratysh (ISR) | 2 | 1 | 1 | 4 | 11 | 1–4 VSU1 | 3–1 VPO1 | — |

Source: UWW

Semifinals
Anastassiya Panassovich (KAZ) | 1
Marilyn Garcia (USA) | 3^{F}
Larisa Nițu (ROU) | 10
Bükrenaz Sert (TUR) | 9

Final
Marilyn Garcia (USA) | 1
Larisa Nițu (ROU) | 4
Bronze medal
Anastassiya Panassovich (KAZ) | 2
Bükrenaz Sert (TUR) | 1

==== Women's freestyle 76 kg ====
| Pos | Athlete | Pld | W | L | CP | TP | TUR | JPN | ROU |
|---|---|---|---|---|---|---|---|---|---|
| 1 | Yasemin Adar Yiğit (TUR) | 2 | 2 | 0 | 7 | 19 | — | 9–0 | 10–0 |
| 2 | Mizuki Nagashima (JPN) | 2 | 1 | 1 | 3 | 6 | 0–3 VPO | — | 6–0 |
| 3 | Diana Vlăsceanu (ROU) | 2 | 0 | 2 | 0 | 0 | 0–4 VSU | 0–3 VPO | — |

Source: UWW
