= Naomi Ruike =

Japanese freestyle wrestler

Sport
- Country: Japan
- Sport: Amateur wrestling
- Weight class: 65 kg
- Event: Freestyle
Medal record
Women's freestyle wrestling
Representing Japan
Asian Championships
Gold medal – first place	2020 New Delhi	65 kg
Silver medal – second place	2019 Xi'an	65 kg
Dan Kolov - Nikola Petrov Tournament
Gold medal – first place	2023 Sofia	65 kg

Naomi Ruike is a Japanese freestyle wrestler. She won the gold medal in the women's 65 kg event at the 2020 Asian Wrestling Championships held in New Delhi, India. A year earlier she won the silver medal in this event.

In 2019, she competed in the women's freestyle 65 kg event at the World Wrestling Championships held in Nur-Sultan, Kazakhstan. She was eliminated in her first match by Wang Xiaoqian of China, an eventual bronze medalists.

She won the gold medal in the women's 65 kg event at the 2023 Dan Kolov & Nikola Petrov Tournament held in Sofia, Bulgaria.
