= Yuzuka Inagaki =

Japanese freestyle wrestler

Sport
- Country: Japan
- Sport: Amateur wrestling
- Weight class: 59 kg; 62 kg
- Event: Freestyle
Medal record
Women's freestyle wrestling
Representing Japan
Asian Championships
Gold medal – first place	2019 Xi'an	59 kg
World U23 Championship
Gold medal – first place	2019 Budapest	62 kg
Dan Kolov - Nikola Petrov Tournament
Gold medal – first place	2023 Sofia	62 kg
Golden Grand Prix Ivan Yarygin
Gold medal – first place	2019 Krasnoyarsk	59 kg

Yuzuka Inagaki is a Japanese freestyle wrestler. She won the gold medal in the women's 59 kg event at the 2019 Asian Wrestling Championships held in Xi'an, China.

In the same year, at the Golden Grand Prix Ivan Yarygin 2019 held in Krasnoyarsk, Russia, she won the gold medal in the women's 59 kg event. She also competed in the women's 59 kg event at the 2019 World Wrestling Championships held in Nur-Sultan, Kazakhstan without winning a medal. She was eliminated in her second match by Pooja Dhanda of India.

She won the gold medal in the women's 62 kg event at the 2023 Dan Kolov & Nikola Petrov Tournament held in Sofia, Bulgaria.

== Achievements ==
Year	Tournament	Location	Result	Event
2019	Asian Championships	Xi'an, China	1st	Freestyle 59 kg
