= 2025 World Wrestling Championships – Women's freestyle 65 kg =

Wrestling competitions

Women's freestyle 65 kg at the 2025 World Championships
- Venue: Arena Zagreb
- Dates: 16–17 September 2025
- Competitors: 17 from 16 nations

Medalists
gold medal	Miwa Morikawa	Japan
silver medal	Alina Kasabieva
bronze medal	Irina Rîngaci	Moldova
bronze medal	Tüvshinjargalyn Enkhjin	Mongolia

The women's freestyle 65 kilograms is a competition featured at the 2025 World Wrestling Championships, and was held in Zagreb, Croatia on 17 and 18 September 2025.

This freestyle wrestling competition consists of a single-elimination tournament, with a repechage used to determine the winner of two bronze medals. The two finalists face off for gold and silver medals. Each wrestler who loses to one of the two finalists moves into the repechage, culminating in a pair of bronze medal matches, featuring the semifinal losers each facing the remaining repechage opponent from their half of the bracket.

== Results ==
Legend

- F — Won by fall

=== Final ===
Final
Miwa Morikawa (JPN)	8
Alina Kasabieva (UWW)	0

=== Top half ===
Round of 32
Alexis Gómez (MEX)	6
Natalia Kubaty (POL)	2

Round of 16
Miwa Morikawa (JPN)	10
Miki Rowbottom (CAN)	0
Alexis Gómez (MEX)	0
Iryna Koliadenko (UKR)	10
Irina Rîngaci (MDA)	12
Aylah Mayali (PLE)	0
Jo Su-been (KOR)	0
Kadriye Aksoy Koçak (TUR)	6^{F}

Quarterfinals
Miwa Morikawa (JPN)	6
Iryna Koliadenko (UKR)	2
Irina Rîngaci (MDA)	16
Kadriye Aksoy Koçak (TUR)	6

Semifinals
Miwa Morikawa (JPN)	10
Irina Rîngaci (MDA)	0

=== Bottom half ===
Round of 32

Round of 16
Tüvshinjargalyn Enkhjin (MGL)	10
Virginia Jiménez (CHI)	0
Vaishnavi Patil (IND)	3
Elma Zeidlere (LAT)	1
Grace Bullen (NOR)	11
Zhang Qi (CHN)	0
Alina Kasabieva (UWW)	6
Macey Kilty (USA)	6

Quarterfinals
Tüvshinjargalyn Enkhjin (MGL)	4^{F}
Vaishnavi Patil (IND)	2
Grace Bullen (NOR)	3
Alina Kasabieva (UWW)	10^{F}

Semifinals
Tüvshinjargalyn Enkhjin (MGL)	3
Alina Kasabieva (UWW)	13

=== Repechage ===
Repechage round 2
Miki Rowbottom (CAN)	0
Iryna Koliadenko (UKR)	10^{F}
Macey Kilty (USA)	7^{F}
Grace Bullen (NOR)	1

Bronze medals
Iryna Koliadenko (UKR)	3
Irina Rîngaci (MDA)	6
Macey Kilty (USA)	2
Tüvshinjargalyn Enkhjin (MGL)	4

== Final standing ==
Rank	Athlete
1st place, gold medalist(s)	Miwa Morikawa (JPN)
2nd place, silver medalist(s)	Alina Kasabieva (UWW)
3rd place, bronze medalist(s)	Irina Rîngaci (MDA)
3rd place, bronze medalist(s)	Tüvshinjargalyn Enkhjin (MGL)
5	Iryna Koliadenko (UKR)
5	Macey Kilty (USA)
7	Kadriye Aksoy Koçak (TUR)
8	Grace Bullen (NOR)
9	Alexis Gómez (MEX)
10	Vaishnavi Patil (IND)
11	Natalia Kubaty (POL)
12	Elma Zeidlere (LAT)
13	Jo Su-been (KOR)
14	Virginia Jiménez (CHI)
15	Zhang Qi (CHN)
16	Aylah Mayali (PLE)
17	Miki Rowbottom (CAN)
