= 2022 U23 World Wrestling Championships – Women's freestyle 65 kg =

Wrestling competitions

Women's freestyle 65 kg at the 2022 U23 World Championships
- Venue: Pontevedra Municipal Sports Hall
- Dates: 20–21 October
- Competitors: 11 from 11 nations

Medalists
gold medal	Miwa Morikawa	Japan
silver medal	Nigar Mirzazada	Azerbaijan
bronze medal	Kateryna Zelenykh	Ukraine
bronze medal	Elena Esposito	Italy

The women's freestyle 65 kilograms is a competition featured at the 2022 U23 World Wrestling Championships, and was held in Pontevedra, Spain on 20 and 21 October 2022. The qualification rounds were held on 20 October while medal matches were held on the 2nd day of the competition. A total of 11 wrestlers competed in this event, limited to athletes whose body weight was less than 65 kilograms.

This freestyle wrestling competition consists of a single-elimination tournament, with a repechage used to determine the winner of two bronze medals. The two finalists face off for gold and silver medals. Each wrestler who loses to one of the two finalists moves into the repechage, culminating in a pair of bronze medal matches featuring the semifinal losers each facing the remaining repechage opponent from their half of the bracket.

== Results ==
Legend

- F — Won by fall

=== Main bracket ===
Round of 16
Kateryna Zelenykh (UKR)	2^{F}
Emma Bruntil (USA)	0
Aleah Nickel (CAN)	2
Elena Esposito (ITA)	3
Nigar Mirzazada (AZE)	7
Nerea Pampín (ESP)	1

Quarterfinals
Iris Thiébaux (FRA)	0
Kateryna Zelenykh (UKR)	2^{F}
Miwa Morikawa (JPN)	10
Aslı Demir (TUR)	0
Iva Gerić (CRO)	0
Elena Esposito (ITA)	4^{F}
Nigar Mirzazada (AZE)	3^{F}
Dariga Aben (KAZ)	0

Semifinals
Kateryna Zelenykh (UKR)	2
Miwa Morikawa (JPN)	6
Elena Esposito (ITA)	2
Nigar Mirzazada (AZE)	3

Final
Miwa Morikawa (JPN)	10
Nigar Mirzazada (AZE)	0

=== Repechage ===
Repechage round
Nerea Pampín (ESP)	4
Dariga Aben (KAZ)	6^{F}

Bronze medals
Aslı Demir (TUR)	0
Kateryna Zelenykh (UKR)	4^{F}
Dariga Aben (KAZ)	5
Elena Esposito (ITA)	5

== Final standing ==
Rank	Athlete
1st place, gold medalist(s)	Miwa Morikawa (JPN)
2nd place, silver medalist(s)	Nigar Mirzazada (AZE)
3rd place, bronze medalist(s)	Kateryna Zelenykh (UKR)
3rd place, bronze medalist(s)	Elena Esposito (ITA)
5	Aslı Demir (TUR)
5	Dariga Aben (KAZ)
7	Nerea Pampín (ESP)
8	Aleah Nickel (CAN)
9	Iris Thiébaux (FRA)
10	Emma Bruntil (USA)
11	Iva Gerić (CRO)
