= Aznaur Tavaev =

Russian freestyle wrestler (born 1998)

Personal information
- Native name: Азнаур Таваев; Азнаур Залимханович Таваев
- Full name: Aznaur Zalimkhanovich Tavaev
- National team: Russia
- Born: 24 November 1998 (age 27) Adil-Yangiyurt, Dagestan, Russia

Sport
- Country: Russia
- Sport: Wrestling
- Weight class: 74kg
- Rank: Master of sports in freestyle wrestling
- Event: Freestyle
- Club: Spartak (Khasavyurt)
- Coached by: Zalimkhan Tavaev; Arsen Biibulatov

Achievements and titles
- National finals: (bronze) (2023)
Medal record
Men's freestyle wrestling
Representing Russia
Golden Grand Prix Ivan Yarygin
Gold medal – first place	2021 Krasnoyarsk	74 kg
Junior European Championships
Gold medal – first place	2018 Rome	65 kg

Aznaur Zalimkhanovich Tavaev (Russian: Азнаур Залимханович Таваев; born 24 November 1998) is a Russian freestyle wrestler who claimed the senior bronze medal at the 2023 Russian National Championships. He wrestles at the 74 kg category on the international circuit.

== Background ==
Tavaev was born on 24 November 1998 in Adil-Yangiyurt village, Dagestan, Russia. He started wrestling at age of eleven at the Spartak wrestling club under his father Zalimkhan.

== Career ==
In 2018, he had the junior European title at 65 kilos in Rome, Italy. In 2019, he took the third place at the senior tournament Ali Aliev Memorial in Kaspiysk, Dagestan. In 2021, Aznaur won in the freestyle 74 kg event at the Golden Grand Prix Ivan Yarygin. He competed at the 2023 Russian National Championships, where he beat world champion Zagir Shakhiev in the bronze medal match.

== Championships and achievements ==
- 2018 Junior European Championships — 1st;
- 2019 Ali Aliev Memorial — 3rd;
- 2021 Golden Grand Prix Ivan Yarygin — 1st;
- 2023 Russian National Championships — 3rd;
