= 2023 World Wrestling Championships – Women's freestyle 65 kg =

Wrestling competitions

Women's freestyle 65 kg at the 2023 World Championships
- Venue: Štark Arena
- Dates: 20–21 September 2023
- Competitors: 17 from 14 nations

Medalists
gold medal	Nonoka Ozaki	Japan
silver medal	Macey Kilty	United States
bronze medal	Mimi Hristova	Bulgaria
bronze medal	Lili	China

The women's freestyle 65 kg is a competition featured at the 2023 World Wrestling Championships, and was held in Belgrade, Serbia on 20 and 21 September 2023.

This freestyle wrestling competition consists of a single-elimination tournament, with a repechage used to determine the winner of two bronze medals. The two finalists face off for gold and silver medals. Each wrestler who loses to one of the two finalists moves into the repechage, culminating in a pair of bronze medal matches featuring the semifinal losers each facing the remaining repechage opponent from their half of the bracket.

== Results ==
Legend

- F — Won by fall

=== Final ===
Final
Macey Kilty (USA)	0
Nonoka Ozaki (JPN)	10

=== Top half ===
Round of 32
Macey Kilty (USA)	10
Valeria Dondupova (AIN)	0

Round of 16
Mimi Hristova (BUL)	10
Tüvshinjargalyn Enkhjin (MGL)	0
Macey Kilty (USA)	10^{F}
Albina Drazhi (ALB)	0
Irina Kazyulina (KAZ)	2
Oksana Herhel (UKR)	13
Tatsiana Paulava (AIN)	6^{F}
Eunice Mburu (KEN)	0

Quarterfinals
Mimi Hristova (BUL)	2
Macey Kilty (USA)	11
Oksana Herhel (UKR)	1
Tatsiana Paulava (AIN)	4^{F}

Semifinals
Macey Kilty (USA)	10
Tatsiana Paulava (AIN)	0

=== Bottom half ===
Round of 32

Round of 16
Aleah Nickel (CAN)	0
Nonoka Ozaki (JPN)	10
Birgul Soltanova (AZE)	1
Kadriye Aksoy (TUR)	5^{F}
Maša Perović (SRB)	0
Lili (CHN)	10
Antim Kundu (UWW)	6
Iva Gerić (CRO)	0

Quarterfinals
Nonoka Ozaki (JPN)	9
Kadriye Aksoy (TUR)	0
Lili (CHN)	10^{F}
Antim Kundu (UWW)	4

Semifinals
Nonoka Ozaki (JPN)	10
Lili (CHN)	0

=== Repechage ===
Repechage round 1
Valeria Dondupova (AIN)	8
Albina Drazhi (ALB)	4

Repechage round 2
Valeria Dondupova (AIN)	0
Mimi Hristova (BUL)	2^{F}
Aleah Nickel (CAN)	0
Kadriye Aksoy (TUR)	4^{F}

Bronze medals
Mimi Hristova (BUL)	4^{F}
Tatsiana Paulava (AIN)	2
Kadriye Aksoy (TUR)	2
Lili (CHN)	3

== Final standing ==
Rank	Athlete
1st place, gold medalist(s)	Nonoka Ozaki (JPN)
2nd place, silver medalist(s)	Macey Kilty (USA)
3rd place, bronze medalist(s)	Mimi Hristova (BUL)
3rd place, bronze medalist(s)	Lili (CHN)
5	Tatsiana Paulava (AIN)
5	Kadriye Aksoy (TUR)
7	Oksana Herhel (UKR)
8	Antim Kundu (UWW)
9	Valeria Dondupova (AIN)
10	Albina Drazhi (ALB)
11	Irina Kazyulina (KAZ)
12	Birgul Soltanova (AZE)
13	Iva Gerić (CRO)
14	Eunice Mburu (KEN)
15	Maša Perović (SRB)
16	Tüvshinjargalyn Enkhjin (MGL)
17	Aleah Nickel (CAN)
