= Lili (wrestler) =

Chinese freestyle wrestler

Personal information
- Native name: 丽丽
- Born: 2000 (age 25–26) Tongliao, Inner Mongolia, China
- Education: Inner Mongolia University for Nationalities

Sport
- Country: China
- Sport: Amateur wrestling
- Weight class: 62 kg
- Event: Freestyle
Medal record
Women's freestyle wrestling
Representing China
World Championships
Bronze medal – third place	2023 Belgrade	65 kg
Asian Championships
Gold medal – first place	2026 Bishkek	65 kg
Grand Prix
Gold medal – first place	2025 Tirana	65 kg

Lili (born 2000) is a Chinese freestyle wrestler of Mongol ethnicity. She won a bronze medal in the 65kg event at the 2023 World Wrestling Championships held in Belgrade, Serbia.

== Background ==
Lili was born in 2000 and is from Tongliao, Inner Mongolia in China.

In 2017, Lili joined the Inner Mongolia provincial wrestling team.

In 2020, Lili was admitted as an undergraduate to Inner Mongolia University for Nationalities where she majored in Physical education.

In 2023, Lili won a bronze medal in the 65kg event at the 2023 World Wrestling Championships by defeating Kadriye Aksoy.
