= 2019 World Wrestling Championships – Women's freestyle 65 kg =

Women's freestyle 65 kg at the 2019 World Championships
- Venue: Barys Arena
- Dates: 18–19 September 2019
- Competitors: 17 from 17 nations

Medalists
gold medal	Inna Trazhukova	Russia
silver medal	Iryna Koliadenko	Ukraine
bronze medal	Wang Xiaoqian	China
bronze medal	Elis Manolova	Azerbaijan

The women's freestyle 65 kilograms is a competition featured at the 2019 World Wrestling Championships, and was held in Nur-Sultan, Kazakhstan on 18 and 19 September.

This freestyle wrestling competition consists of a single-elimination tournament, with a repechage used to determine the winner of two bronze medals. The two finalists face off for gold and silver medals. Each wrestler who loses to one of the two finalists moves into the repechage, culminating in a pair of bronze medal matches featuring the semifinal losers each facing the remaining repechage opponent from their half of the bracket.

== Results ==
Legend

- F — Won by fall

=== Final ===
Final
Iryna Koliadenko (UKR)	0
Inna Trazhukova (RUS)	13

=== Top half ===
Round of 32

Round of 16
Forrest Molinari (USA)	7^{F}
Nguyễn Thị Vinh (VIE)	0
Johanna Mattsson (SWE)	4
Gabriella Sleisz (HUN)	0
Naomi Ruike (JPN)	4
Wang Xiaoqian (CHN)	6
Iryna Koliadenko (UKR)	3
Khürelkhüügiin Bolortuyaa (MGL)	1

Quarterfinals
Forrest Molinari (USA)	3
Johanna Mattsson (SWE)	0
Wang Xiaoqian (CHN)	4
Iryna Koliadenko (UKR)	12^{F}

Semifinals
Forrest Molinari (USA)	5
Iryna Koliadenko (UKR)	5

=== Bottom half ===
Round of 32
Inna Trazhukova (RUS)	4^{F}
Choi Se-eun (KOR)	0

Round of 16
Elis Manolova (AZE)	5^{F}
Navjot Kaur (IND)	0
Kadriye Aksoy (TUR)	5
Fatoumata Camara (GUI)	4
Jessica Brouillette (CAN)	0
Yuliana Yaneva (BUL)	11
Inna Trazhukova (RUS)	13
Aina Temirtassova (KAZ)	2

Quarterfinals
Elis Manolova (AZE)	5^{F}
Kadriye Aksoy (TUR)	0
Yuliana Yaneva (BUL)	0
Inna Trazhukova (RUS)	3

Semifinals
Elis Manolova (AZE)	4
Inna Trazhukova (RUS)	6

=== Repechage ===
Repechage round 1
Choi Se-eun (KOR)	0
Aina Temirtassova (KAZ)	4^{F}

Repechage round 2
Khürelkhüügiin Bolortuyaa (MGL)	6
Wang Xiaoqian (CHN)	10
Aina Temirtassova (KAZ)	1
Yuliana Yaneva (BUL)	6

Bronze medals
Wang Xiaoqian (CHN)	10
Forrest Molinari (USA)	0
Yuliana Yaneva (BUL)	1
Elis Manolova (AZE)	3
