= 2026 European Wrestling Championships – Women's freestyle 68 kg =

Wrestling competition held in Tirana, Albania

Women's freestyle 68 kg at the 2026 European Wrestling Championships
- Venue: Tirana Olympic Park
- Location: Tirana, Albania
- Dates: 22–23 April
- Competitors: 13 from 11 nations

Medalists
gold medal	Nesrin Baş	Turkey
silver medal	Alina Shauchuk
bronze medal	Kateryna Zelenykh	Romania
bronze medal	Tindra Sjöberg	Sweden

The women's freestyle 68 kilograms competition at the 2026 European Wrestling Championships was held from 22 to 23 April 2026 at the Tirana Olympic Park in Tirana, Albania.

== Results ==
Legend

- F — Won by fall
- WO — Won by walkover

=== Main bracket ===
Round of 16
Laura Godino (ITA)	0
Manola Skobelska (UKR)	11
Karolina Domaszuk (POL)	0
Alina Shauchuk (UWW)	10
Albina Drazhi (ALB)
Noémi Szabados (HUN)	WO
Daniela Brasnarova (BUL)	0
Tindra Sjöberg (SWE)	2^{F}
Luciana Beda (MDA)	0
Alina Shevchenko (UWW)	7

Quarterfinals
Kateryna Zelenykh (ROU)	5
Manola Skobelska (UKR)	2
Alina Shauchuk (UWW)	10
Noémi Szabados (HUN)	0
Nesrin Baş (TUR)	11
Tindra Sjöberg (SWE)	0
Alina Shevchenko (UWW)	5
Sophia Schäfle (GER)	3

Semifinals
Kateryna Zelenykh (ROU)	3
Alina Shauchuk (UWW)	4
Nesrin Baş (TUR)	12
Alina Shevchenko (UWW)	1

Final
Alina Shauchuk (UWW)
Nesrin Baş (TUR)	WO

=== Repechage ===
Repechage round 1
Karolina Domaszuk (POL)	1
Noémi Szabados (HUN)	5

Bronze medal matches
Noémi Szabados (HUN)	4
Kateryna Zelenykh (ROU)	5
Tindra Sjöberg (SWE)	10
Alina Shevchenko (UWW)	0

== Final standing ==
Rank	Wrestler
1st place, gold medalist(s)	Nesrin Baş (TUR)
2nd place, silver medalist(s)	Alina Shauchuk (UWW)
3rd place, bronze medalist(s)	Kateryna Zelenykh (ROU)
3rd place, bronze medalist(s)	Tindra Sjöberg (SWE)
5	Noémi Szabados (HUN)
5	Alina Shevchenko (UWW)
7	Manola Skobelska (UKR)
8	Sophia Schäfle (GER)
9	Karolina Domaszuk (POL)
10	Albina Drazhi (ALB)
11	Daniela Brasnarova (BUL)
12	Luciana Beda (MDA)
13	Laura Godino (ITA)
