= 2023 Russian National Freestyle Wrestling Championships =

2023 Russian Nationals
- Host city: Kaspiysk, Dagestan, Russia
- Dates: June 20–24
- Stadium: Ali Aliyev Sport Complex

Champions
- Freestyle: Dagestan
- Women: Krasnoyarsk Krai

The Men's and women's Russian National Freestyle Wrestling Championships 2023 (also known as the Russian Nationals 2023) was held in Kaspiysk, Dagestan by the Russian Wrestling Federation at the Ali Aliyev Sport Complex between 20 June to 24 June 2023.

== Men's freestyle ==
Event	Gold	Silver	Bronze
57 kg	(Dagestan) Zaur Uguev	(North Ossetia–Alania) Artem Gobaev	(Tuva) Nachyn Mongush
57 kg	(Dagestan) Zaur Uguev	(North Ossetia–Alania) Artem Gobaev	(Dagestan) Ramiz Gamzatov
61 kg	(Dagestan) Abasgadzhi Magomedov	(Dagestan) Muslim Mekhtikhanov	(Dagestan) Dinislam Takhtarov
61 kg	(Dagestan) Abasgadzhi Magomedov	(Dagestan) Muslim Mekhtikhanov	(North Ossetia–Alania) Alik Khadartsev
65 kg	(Dagestan) Shamil Mamedov	(Dagestan) Ibragim Ibragimov	(Khanty-Mansi Autonomous Okrug) Dzambulat Kizinov
65 kg	(Dagestan) Shamil Mamedov	(Dagestan) Ibragim Ibragimov	(Dagestan) Gadzhimurad Omarov
70 kg	(Buryatia) Yevgeny Zherbaev	(Moscow Oblast) Inalbek Sheriev	(Dagestan) Kurban Shiraev
70 kg	(Buryatia) Yevgeny Zherbaev	(Moscow Oblast) Inalbek Sheriev	(Dagestan) Aznaur Tavaev
74 kg	(North Ossetia–Alania) Chermen Valiev	(Krasnodar Krai) Timur Bizhoev	(Dagestan) Magoma Dibirgadzhiev
74 kg	(North Ossetia–Alania) Chermen Valiev	(Krasnodar Krai) Timur Bizhoev	(Khanty-Mansi Autonomous Okrug) David Baev
79 kg	(Dagestan) Akhmed Usmanov	(Bryansk Oblast) Gadzhimurad Alikhmaev	(Chechnya) Khalid Yakhiev
79 kg	(Dagestan) Akhmed Usmanov	(Bryansk Oblast) Gadzhimurad Alikhmaev	(Kaliningrad Oblast) Akhmed Manilov
86 kg	(North Ossetia–Alania) Arslan Bagaev	(Dagestan) Amanula Gadzhimagomedov	(Dagestan) Ada Bagomedov
86 kg	(North Ossetia–Alania) Arslan Bagaev	(Dagestan) Amanula Gadzhimagomedov	(North Ossetia–Alania) Artur Naifonov
92 kg	(North Ossetia–Alania) Vladislav Valiev	(Dagestan) Tazhudin Mukhtarov	(North Ossetia–Alania) Alan Bagaev
92 kg	(North Ossetia–Alania) Vladislav Valiev	(Dagestan) Tazhudin Mukhtarov	(Dagestan) Askhab Saadulaev
97 kg	(Chechnya) Alikhan Zhabrailov	(Dagestan) Magomed Kurbanov	(North Ossetia–Alania) Sergey Kozyrev
97 kg	(Chechnya) Alikhan Zhabrailov	(Dagestan) Magomed Kurbanov	(Dagestan) Shamil Musaev
125 kg	(Krasnodar Krai) Abdula Kurbanov	(North Ossetia–Alania) Erik Dzhioev	(North Ossetia–Alania) Alen Khubulov
125 kg	(Krasnodar Krai) Abdula Kurbanov	(North Ossetia–Alania) Erik Dzhioev	(Republic of Crimea (Russia)) Soslan Khinchagov

== Women's freestyle ==
Event	Gold	Silver	Bronze
50 kg	(Rostov Oblast) Polina Lukina	(Dagestan) Elizaveta Smirnova	(Nizhny Novgorod Oblast) Nadezhda Sokolova
50 kg	(Rostov Oblast) Polina Lukina	(Dagestan) Elizaveta Smirnova	(Khakassia) Mariya Tyumerekova
53 kg	(Khakassia) Natalia Malysheva	(Saint Petersburg) Anzhelika Vetoshkina	(Krasnoyarsk Krai) Daria Khvostova
53 kg	(Khakassia) Natalia Malysheva	(Saint Petersburg) Anzhelika Vetoshkina	(Dagestan) Milana Dadasheva
55 kg	(Krasnodar Krai) Ekaterina Poleshchuk	(Buryatia) Irina Ologonova	(Krasnodar Krai) Aleksandra Skirenko
55 kg	(Krasnodar Krai) Ekaterina Poleshchuk	(Buryatia) Irina Ologonova	(Krasnoyarsk Krai) Ekaterina Isakova
57 kg	(Krasnoyarsk Krai) Olga Khoroshavtseva	(Rostov Oblast) Marina Simonyan	(Sakha Republic) Sevil Nazarova
57 kg	(Krasnoyarsk Krai) Olga Khoroshavtseva	(Rostov Oblast) Marina Simonyan	(Republic of Crimea (Russia)) Kristina Mikhneva
59 kg	(Buryatia) Zhargalma Tsyrempilova	(Kemerovo Oblast) Zelfira Sadraddinova	(Kemerovo Oblast) Anastasiia Sidelnikova
59 kg	(Buryatia) Zhargalma Tsyrempilova	(Kemerovo Oblast) Zelfira Sadraddinova	(Kaliningrad Oblast) Alexandra Andreeva
62 kg	(Republic of Crimea (Russia)) Alina Kasabieva	(Tatarstan) Svetlana Lipatova	(Saint Petersburg) Alina Rybkina
62 kg	(Republic of Crimea (Russia)) Alina Kasabieva	(Tatarstan) Svetlana Lipatova	(Chuvashia) Alena Timofeeva
65 kg	(Buryatia) Valeria Dondupova	(Tatarstan) Ekaterina Koshkina	(Krasnodar Krai) Kristina Bratchikova
65 kg	(Buryatia) Valeria Dondupova	(Tatarstan) Ekaterina Koshkina	(Krasnoyarsk Krai) Dinara Kudaeva
68 kg	(Krasnoyarsk Krai) Khanum Velieva	(Dagestan) Kseniya Burakova	(Moscow Oblast) Vusala Parfianovich
68 kg	(Krasnoyarsk Krai) Khanum Velieva	(Dagestan) Kseniya Burakova	(Sakhalin Oblast) Anastasiia Parokhina
72 kg	(Saint Petersburg) Marina Surovtseva	(Irkutsk Oblast) Valentina Tokhtoeva	(Krasnoyarsk Krai) Valeria Trifonova
72 kg	(Saint Petersburg) Marina Surovtseva	(Irkutsk Oblast) Valentina Tokhtoeva	(Sakha Republic) Liliana Rozhina
76 kg	(Moscow Oblast) Ekaterina Bukina	(Moscow) Rita Talismanova	(Krasnodar Krai) Maria Silina
76 kg	(Moscow Oblast) Ekaterina Bukina	(Moscow) Rita Talismanova	(Krasnoyarsk Krai) Kristina Shumova

== Prize money ==
The sums written are per medalist, bringing the total prizes awarded to 7,500,000 rub.

Medal	Total	Wrestler	Coach
Gold	400,000 rub	250,000 rub	150,000 rub
Silver	150,000 rub	150,000 rub	
Bronze	100,000 rub	100,000 rub	

== See also ==
- 2022 Russian National Freestyle Wrestling Championships
- 2021 Russian National Freestyle Wrestling Championships
- 2020 Russian National Freestyle Wrestling Championships
- 2019 Russian National Freestyle Wrestling Championships
- 2018 Russian National Freestyle Wrestling Championships
- 2017 Russian National Freestyle Wrestling Championships
- Soviet and Russian results in men's freestyle wrestling
