= Klippan Lady Open (2018) =

- Host city: Klippan, Sweden
- Dates: 16 February – 18 February
- Stadium: Klippan Hall of Sports (Idrottshallen)

Champions
- Women: United States

The 25th Klippan Lady Open was held in Klippan, Sweden, between 16 February and 18 February 2018.

== Medal table ==
Rank	Nation	Gold	Silver	Bronze	Total
1	Japan (JPN)	3	3	0	6
2	United States (USA)	2	0	5	7
3	Russia (RUS)	1	1	6	8
4	Canada (CAN)	1	0	2	3
4	Sweden (SWE)	1	0	2	3
6	Finland (FIN)	1	0	0	1
6	Norway (NOR)	1	0	0	1
8	Ukraine (UKR)	0	3	0	3
9	Turkey (TUR)	0	2	1	3
10	Azerbaijan (AZE)	0	1	0	1
11	Estonia (EST)	0	0	1	1
11	Germany (GER)	0	0	1	1
11	Hungary (HUN)	0	0	1	1
11	Romania (ROU)	0	0	1	1
Totals (14 entries)		10	10	20	40

=== Team ranking ===
Rank	Women's freestyle	
Rank	Team	Points
1	United States	153
2	Japan	147
3	Russia	134
4	Turkey	107
5	Sweden	100
6	Canada	85
7	Romania	73
8	Germany	69
9	Ukraine	60
10	Norway	37

== Medal summary ==
=== Women's freestyle ===
Event	Gold	Silver	Bronze
50 kg	(Japan) Yui Susaki	(Azerbaijan) Mariya Stadnyk	(Romania) Alina Vuc
50 kg	(Japan) Yui Susaki	(Azerbaijan) Mariya Stadnyk	(Russia) Anzhelika Vetoshkina
53 kg	(Japan) Nanami Irie	(Japan) Umi Imai	(United States) Sarah Hildebrandt
53 kg	(Japan) Nanami Irie	(Japan) Umi Imai	(Russia) Natalia Malysheva
55 kg	(Russia) Stalvira Orshush	(Turkey) Bediha Gün	(Russia) Nina Menkenova
55 kg	(Russia) Stalvira Orshush	(Turkey) Bediha Gün	(Hungary) Ramóna Galambos
57 kg	(Japan) Sae Nanjo	(Ukraine) Tetyana Kit	(Russia) Irina Ologonova
57 kg	(Japan) Sae Nanjo	(Ukraine) Tetyana Kit	(Russia) Alexandra Andreeva
59 kg	(Norway) Grace Bullen	(Japan) Akie Hanai	(United States) Lauren Louive
59 kg	(Norway) Grace Bullen	(Japan) Akie Hanai	(Turkey) Elif Jale Yeşilırmak
62 kg	(United States) Kayla Miracle	(Ukraine) Yuliya Tkach	(Sweden) Olivia Henningsson
62 kg	(United States) Kayla Miracle	(Ukraine) Yuliya Tkach	(Germany) Luisa Niemesch
65 kg	(Finland) Petra Olli	(Japan) Miwa Morikawa	(Russia) Yulia Prontsevitch
65 kg	(Finland) Petra Olli	(Japan) Miwa Morikawa	(Sweden) Henna Johansson
68 kg	(Canada) Danielle Lappage	(Ukraine) Alla Cherkasova	(United States) Tamyra Mensah
68 kg	(Canada) Danielle Lappage	(Ukraine) Alla Cherkasova	(Canada) Olivia Di Bacco
72 kg	(Sweden) Jenny Fransson	(Ukraine) Tatiana Kolesnikova	(United States) Victoria Francis
72 kg	(Sweden) Jenny Fransson	(Ukraine) Tatiana Kolesnikova	(United States) Rachel Watters
76 kg	(United States) Adeline Gray	(Turkey) Yasemin Adar	(Canada) Erica Wiebe
76 kg	(United States) Adeline Gray	(Turkey) Yasemin Adar	(Estonia) Epp Mäe

== Results ==
=== Women's freestyle ===
==== 50 kg ====
17 February and 18 February

Final
Mariya Stadnyk (AZE)	2
Yui Susaki (JPN)	2

Round of 32

Round of 16
Evin Demirhan (TUR)	8
Jessica MacDonald (CAN)	13
Alina Vuc (ROU)	0
Mariya Stadnyk (AZE)	10
Valeriya Chepsarakova (RUS)	4
Amy Fearnside (USA)	7
Erin Golston (USA)	10
Ramona Eriksen (NOR)	0

Quarterfinals
Jessica MacDonald (CAN)	0
Mariya Stadnyk (AZE)	12
Amy Fearnside (USA)	11
Erin Golston (USA)	3

Semifinals
Mariya Stadnyk (AZE)	10
Amy Fearnside (USA)	0

Round of 32
Yui Susaki (JPN)	10
Lovisa Ljungström (SWE)	0
Anzhelika Vetoshkina (RUS)	11
Jaqueline Schellin (GER)	7

Round of 16
Patricia Bermúdez (ARG)	4^{F}
Gwendaline Jossec (AUS)	0
Milana Dadasheva (RUS)	6
Jessica Blaszka (NED)	7
Victoria Anthony (USA)	10
Natasha Kramble (CAN)	0
Yui Susaki (JPN)	4
Anzhelika Vetoshkina (RUS)	2

Quarterfinals
Patricia Bermúdez (ARG)	4
Jessica Blaszka (NED)	3
Victoria Anthony (USA)	1
Yui Susaki (JPN)	7

Semifinals
Patricia Bermúdez (ARG)	2
Yui Susaki (JPN)	12

Repechage round 1
Lovisa Ljungström (SWE)	4
Anzhelika Vetoshkina (RUS)	10

Repechage round 2
Alina Vuc (ROU)	8
Jessica MacDonald (CAN)	5
Anzhelika Vetoshkina (RUS)	4
Victoria Anthony (USA)	4

Bronze medals
Alina Vuc (ROU)	11
Amy Fearnside (USA)	8
Anzhelika Vetoshkina (RUS)	15
Patricia Bermúdez (ARG)	4

==== 53 kg ====
17 February and 18 February

1/8 finals
Sarah Hildebrandt (USA)	10
Karalina Tjapko (LAT)	0
Umi Imai (JPN)	4
Silje Kippernes (NOR)	0^{R}
Evelin Sosa (ARG)	0
Jade Parsons (CAN)	10
Mercédesz Dénes (HUN)
Natalia Malysheva (RUS)	WO
Ekaterina Poleshchuk (RUS)	10
Daniela Lundström (SWE)	0

Quarterfinals
Nanami Irie (JPN)	6^{F}
Aysun Erge (TUR)	2
Nina Hemmer (GER)	0
Sarah Hildebrandt (USA)	10
Umi Imai (JPN)	12
Jade Parsons (CAN)	2
Natalia Malysheva (RUS)	4
Ekaterina Poleshchuk (RUS)	1

Semifinals
Nanami Irie (JPN)	11
Sarah Hildebrandt (USA)	0
Umi Imai (JPN)	4
Natalia Malysheva (RUS)	1

Final
Nanami Irie (JPN)	4
Umi Imai (JPN)	2

Repechage round 1
Silje Kippernes (NOR)	2
Jade Parsons (CAN)	11

Bronze medal match
Aysun Erge (TUR)	0
Sarah Hildebrandt (USA)	10
Jade Parsons (CAN)	3
Natalia Malysheva (RUS)	11

==== 55 kg ====
17 February and 18 February

1/8 finals
Sandra Paruszewski (GER)	1
Elena Brugger (GER)	1
Ronna Heaton (USA)	8^{F}
Liliana Juarez Andino (SWE)	0
Andreea Ana (ROU)
Sena Nagamoto (JPN)	WO
Emma Brobeck (SWE)	0
Stalvira Orshush (RUS)	11
Ramóna Galambos (HUN)	9
Estera Tamaduianu (ROU)	3

Quarterfinals
Jacarra Winchester (USA)	4
Bediha Gün (TUR)	5
Nina Menkenova (RUS)	5^{F}
Sandra Paruszewski (GER)	0
Ronna Heaton (USA)	2
Sena Nagamoto (JPN)	12
Stalvira Orshush (RUS)	2
Ramóna Galambos (HUN)	2

Semifinals
Bediha Gün (TUR)	3
Nina Menkenova (RUS)	3
Sena Nagamoto (JPN)	4
Stalvira Orshush (RUS)	10

Final
Bediha Gün (TUR)	2
Stalvira Orshush (RUS)	3

Repechage round 1
Emma Brobeck (SWE)	0
Ramóna Galambos (HUN)	6^{F}

Bronze medal match
Jacarra Winchester (USA)	4
Nina Menkenova (RUS)	5
Ramóna Galambos (HUN)	2
Sena Nagamoto (JPN)	1

==== 57 kg ====
17 February and 18 February

1/8 finals
Samantha Stewart (CAN)	10
Mehlika Öztürk (TUR)	0
Johanna Lindborg (SWE)	0
Alexandra Andreeva (RUS)	4^{F}
Jessica Lavers-McBain (AUS)	0
Tetyana Kit (UKR)	10
Cara Nania (CAN)	10
Michaela Beck (USA)	0
Laura Mertens (GER)	10
Synne Haagensen (NOR)	0

Quarterfinals
Sae Nanjo (JPN)	4
Irina Ologonova (RUS)	2
Simona Pricob (ROU)	3
Samantha Stewart (CAN)	1
Alexandra Andreeva (RUS)	0
Tetyana Kit (UKR)	4^{F}
Cara Nania (CAN)	0
Laura Mertens (GER)	10

Semifinals
Sae Nanjo (JPN)	6
Simona Pricob (ROU)	0
Tetyana Kit (UKR)	6
Laura Mertens (GER)	1

Final
Sae Nanjo (JPN)	2
Tetyana Kit (UKR)	2

Repechage round 1
Jessica Lavers-McBain (AUS)	0
Alexandra Andreeva (RUS)	10

Bronze medal match
Irina Ologonova (RUS)	WO
Simona Pricob (ROU)
Alexandra Andreeva (RUS)	10
Laura Mertens (GER)	0

==== 59 kg ====
17 February and 18 February

1/8 finals
Akie Hanai (JPN)	5
Veronika Chumikova (RUS)	4
Hannah Franson (CAN)	4
Emma Johansson (SWE)	8
Viktorija Augustauskaitė (LTU)	0^{R}
Elif Jale Yeşilırmak (TUR)	8

Quarterfinals
Grace Bullen (NOR)	7^{C}
Lauren Louive (USA)	0
Koral Sugiyama (USA)	1
Kateryna Zhydachevska (ROU)	12
Uliana Tukurenova (RUS)	4
Akie Hanai (JPN)	7
Emma Johansson (SWE)	0
Elif Jale Yeşilırmak (TUR)	7

Semifinals
Grace Bullen (NOR)	17
Kateryna Zhydachevska (ROU)	10
Akie Hanai (JPN)	3
Elif Jale Yeşilırmak (TUR)	2

Final
Grace Bullen (NOR)	3
Akie Hanai (JPN)	2

Repechage round 1
Veronika Chumikova (RUS)	3
Uliana Tukurenova (RUS)	9

Bronze medal match
Lauren Louive (USA)	2^{F}
Kateryna Zhydachevska (ROU)	8
Uliana Tukurenova (RUS)	3
Elif Jale Yeşilırmak (TUR)	6

==== 62 kg ====
17 February and 18 February

1/8 finals
Luzie Manzke (GER)	0
Yuliya Tkach (UKR)	10^{F}
Tatiana Smoliak (RUS)	1
Luisa Niemesch (GER)	4
Laura Aak (NOR)	2
Kornelija Zaicevaitė (LTU)	12^{F}
Miciel Vennström (SWE)	0
Derya Bayhan (TUR)	3^{F}
Kayla Miracle (USA)	7
Naomi Ruike (JPN)	0

Quarterfinals
Olivia Henningsson (SWE)	6^{F}
Valeriia Suvorova (RUS)	13
Auksė Rutkauskaitė (LTU)	0
Yuliya Tkach (UKR)	10
Luisa Niemesch (GER)	11
Kornelija Zaicevaitė (LTU)	0
Derya Bayhan (TUR)	1
Kayla Miracle (USA)	9^{F}

Semifinals
Olivia Henningsson (SWE)	0
Yuliya Tkach (UKR)	6^{F}
Luisa Niemesch (GER)	1
Kayla Miracle (USA)	2

Final
Yuliya Tkach (UKR)	2
Kayla Miracle (USA)	3

Repechage round 1
Luzie Manzke (GER)	10
Auksė Rutkauskaitė (LTU)	0
Naomi Ruike (JPN)	10^{F}
Derya Bayhan (TUR)	0

Bronze medal match
Luzie Manzke (GER)	5
Olivia Henningsson (SWE)	10
Naomi Ruike (JPN)	0
Luisa Niemesch (GER)	6

==== 65 kg ====
17 February and 18 February

1/8 finals
Forrest Molinari (USA)	0
Petra Olli (FIN)	9
Yulia Prontsevitch (RUS)	8^{F}
Elin Forsberg (SWE)	2
Gabriella Sleisz (HUN)	2
Maya Nelson (USA)	5
Miwa Morikawa (JPN)	10^{F}
Tora Berntsen (NOR)	0
Braxton Stone (CAN)	12
Breanne Graham (CAN)	1
Henna Johansson (SWE)	3
Aslı Tuğcu (TUR)	0
Kriszta Incze (ROU)	1
Mallory Velte (USA)	4

Quarterfinals
Cesilie Magnussen (NOR)	0
Petra Olli (FIN)	10
Yulia Prontsevitch (RUS)	5
Maya Nelson (USA)	2
Miwa Morikawa (JPN)	12
Braxton Stone (CAN)	1
Henna Johansson (SWE)	2
Mallory Velte (USA)	2

Semifinals
Petra Olli (FIN)	5
Yulia Prontsevitch (RUS)	1
Miwa Morikawa (JPN)	2
Henna Johansson (SWE)	2

Final
Petra Olli (FIN)	5
Miwa Morikawa (JPN)	4

Repechage round 1
Forrest Molinari (USA)	10
Cesilie Magnussen (NOR)	0
Tora Berntsen (NOR)	0
Braxton Stone (CAN)	10

Bronze medal match
Forrest Molinari (USA)	1
Yulia Prontsevitch (RUS)	2
Braxton Stone (CAN)	9
Henna Johansson (SWE)	10

==== 68 kg ====
17 February and 18 February

1/8 finals
Buse Tosun (TUR)	3
Tamyra Mensah (USA)	6
Tindra Sjöberg (SWE)	7
Danutė Domikaitytė (LTU)	7^{F}
Adina Popescu (ROU)	0
Laura Skujiņa (LAT)	2
Hedda Strand (NOR)	0
Olivia Di Bacco (CAN)	10
Umi Fukushima (JPN)	0
Julia Salata (USA)	10
Alla Cherkasova (UKR)	3^{F}
Maria Selmaier (GER)	1
Kristina Eremina (RUS)	4
Kayla Brodner (CAN)	6

Quarterfinals
Danielle Lappage (CAN)	4
Tamyra Mensah (USA)	2
Danutė Domikaitytė (LTU)	4
Laura Skujiņa (LAT)	4
Olivia Di Bacco (CAN)	2
Julia Salata (USA)	0
Alla Cherkasova (UKR)	10
Kayla Brodner (CAN)	0

Semifinals
Danielle Lappage (CAN)	11
Laura Skujiņa (LAT)	0
Olivia Di Bacco (CAN)	2
Alla Cherkasova (UKR)	7

Final
Danielle Lappage (CAN)	9
Alla Cherkasova (UKR)	4

Repechage round 1
Maria Selmaier (GER)	10
Kayla Brodner (CAN)	0

Bronze medal match
Tamyra Mensah (USA)	WO
Laura Skujiņa (LAT)
Maria Selmaier (GER)	0
Olivia Di Bacco (CAN)	10

==== 72 kg ====
17 February and 18 February

1/8 finals
Rachel Watters (USA)	1
Tatiana Kolesnikova (RUS)	7^{F}

Quarterfinals
Alexandra Anghel (ROU)	0
Jenny Fransson (SWE)	6
Victoria Francis (USA)	3
Naruha Matsuyuki (JPN)	2
Burcu Örskaya (TUR)	10
Elma Zeidlere (LAT)	0
Kamilė Gaučaitė (LTU)	0
Tatiana Kolesnikova (RUS)	11

Semifinals
Jenny Fransson (SWE)	10
Victoria Francis (USA)	0
Burcu Örskaya (TUR)	0
Tatiana Kolesnikova (RUS)	5

Final
Jenny Fransson (SWE)	10
Tatiana Kolesnikova (RUS)	0

Repechage round 1
Rachel Watters (USA)	14
Kamilė Gaučaitė (LTU)	4

Bronze medal match
Alexandra Anghel (ROU)	0
Victoria Francis (USA)	4
Rachel Watters (USA)	9
Burcu Örskaya (TUR)	3

==== 76 kg ====
17 February and 18 February

1/8 finals
Bianca Kristensson (SWE)	0
Cătălina Axente (ROU)	13
Yasemin Adar (TUR)	6
Erica Wiebe (CAN)	5
Elmira Syzdykova (KAZ)	8
Yasuha Matsuyuki (JPN)	2
Epp Mäe (EST)	12
Anzhela Kataeva (RUS)	2
Leah Ferguson (CAN)	1
Aline Focken (GER)	11
Denise Makota-Ström (SWE)	8
Iselin Moen Solheim (NOR)	0
Zsanett Németh (HUN)	0
Adeline Gray (USA)	4^{F}

Quarterfinals
Francy Rädelt (GER)	10
Cătălina Axente (ROU)	3
Yasemin Adar (TUR)	5^{F}
Elmira Syzdykova (KAZ)	4
Epp Mäe (EST)	6
Aline Focken (GER)	2
Denise Makota-Ström (SWE)	0
Adeline Gray (USA)	10^{F}

Semifinals
Francy Rädelt (GER)	0
Yasemin Adar (TUR)	10^{F}
Epp Mäe (EST)	1
Adeline Gray (USA)	7

Final
Yasemin Adar (TUR)	6
Adeline Gray (USA)	9

Repechage round 1
Erica Wiebe (CAN)	11
Elmira Syzdykova (KAZ)	0
Zsanett Németh (HUN)	5
Denise Makota-Ström (SWE)	12

Bronze medal match
Erica Wiebe (CAN)	10^{F}
Francy Rädelt (GER)	1
Denise Makota-Ström (SWE)	4
Epp Mäe (EST)	7

== Participating nations ==
- Argentina (2)
- Australia (2)
- Azerbaijan (1)
- Canada (13)
- Estonia (1)
- Finland (1)
- Germany (10)
- Hungary (4)
- Japan (11)
- Kazakhstan (1)
- Latvia (3)
- Lithuania (5)
- Netherlands (1)
- Norway (9)
- Romania (9)
- Russia (17)
- Sweden (14)
- Turkey (10)
- Ukraine (3)
- United States (18)
