= 2018 European Juniors Wrestling Championships =

- Host city: Rome, Italy
- Dates: July 30 – August 5, 2018

Champions
- Freestyle: Russia
- Greco-Roman: Russia
- Women: Russia

The 2018 European Juniors Wrestling Championships was held in Rome, Italy between July 30 – August 5, 2018.

== Medal table ==
Rank	Nation	Gold	Silver	Bronze	Total
1	Russia	13	2	7	22
2	Armenia	4	0	6	10
3	Ukraine	3	3	8	14
4	Turkey	3	3	7	13
5	Georgia	2	1	5	8
6	Azerbaijan	1	4	4	9
7	Belarus	1	3	4	8
8	Germany	1	2	4	7
9	Moldova	1	2	1	4
10	Sweden	1	1	1	3
11	Bulgaria	0	3	0	3
12	Italy	0	2	5	7
13	Hungary	0	2	2	4
14	Romania	0	1	3	4
15	Austria	0	1	0	1
16	Finland	0	0	1	1
16	Israel	0	0	1	1
Totals (17 entries)		30	30	59	119

== Team ranking ==
Rank	Men's freestyle		Men's Greco-Roman		Women's freestyle	
Rank	Team	Points	Team	Points	Team	Points
1	Russia	195	Russia	159	Russia	186
2	Azerbaijan	136	Georgia	113	Ukraine	160
3	Armenia	135	Armenia	101	Turkey	136
4	Turkey	126	Belarus	91	Italy	93
5	Ukraine	109	Ukraine	80	Germany	77

== Medal summary ==
=== Men's freestyle ===
Event	Gold	Silver	Bronze
57 kg	(Armenia) Arsen Harutyunyan	(Ukraine) Andrii Dzhelep	(Georgia (country)) Teimuraz Vanishvili
57 kg	(Armenia) Arsen Harutyunyan	(Ukraine) Andrii Dzhelep	(Azerbaijan) Aliabbas Rzazade
61 kg	(Armenia) Vazgen Tevanyan	(Azerbaijan) Intigam Valizada	(Georgia (country)) Ramaz Turmanidze
61 kg	(Armenia) Vazgen Tevanyan	(Azerbaijan) Intigam Valizada	(Ukraine) Ihor Nykyforuk
65 kg	(Russia) Aznaur Tavaev	(Moldova) Nicolai Grahmez	(Armenia) Gegham Galstyan
65 kg	(Russia) Aznaur Tavaev	(Moldova) Nicolai Grahmez	(Belarus) Mikita Strakh
70 kg	(Russia) Chermen Valiev	(Azerbaijan) Khadzhimurad Gadzhiyev	(Ukraine) Stepan Lylyk
70 kg	(Russia) Chermen Valiev	(Azerbaijan) Khadzhimurad Gadzhiyev	(Armenia) Arman Andreasyan
74 kg	(Russia) Akhmed Shokumov	(Bulgaria) Dzhemal Rushen Ali	(Azerbaijan) Ismail Abdullaev
74 kg	(Russia) Akhmed Shokumov	(Bulgaria) Dzhemal Rushen Ali	(Moldova) Piotr Caraseni
79 kg	(Turkey) Ramazan Sarı	(Moldova) Adrian Grosul	(Azerbaijan) Orkhan Abasov
79 kg	(Turkey) Ramazan Sarı	(Moldova) Adrian Grosul	(Ukraine) Adlan Bataiev
86 kg	(Turkey) Arif Özen	(Hungary) Patrik Szurovszki	(Israel) Uri Kalashnikov
86 kg	(Turkey) Arif Özen	(Hungary) Patrik Szurovszki	(Georgia (country)) Demur Megeneishvili
92 kg	(Russia) Azamat Zakuev	(Azerbaijan) Askhab Hamzatov	(Germany) Ertugrul Ağca
92 kg	(Russia) Azamat Zakuev	(Azerbaijan) Askhab Hamzatov	(Turkey) Erhan Yaylacı
97 kg	(Georgia (country)) Zuriko Urtashvili	(Turkey) Feyzullah Aktürk	(Belarus) Yaraslau Slavikouski
97 kg	(Georgia (country)) Zuriko Urtashvili	(Turkey) Feyzullah Aktürk	(Russia) Alen Khubulov
125 kg	(Armenia) Hovhannes Maghakyan	(Ukraine) Yurii Idzinskyi	(Turkey) Oktay Güngör
125 kg	(Armenia) Hovhannes Maghakyan	(Ukraine) Yurii Idzinskyi	(Azerbaijan) Rahid Hamidli

=== Men's Greco-Roman ===
Event	Gold	Silver	Bronze
55 kg	(Armenia) Tigran Minasyan	(Italy) Giovanni Freni	(Turkey) Cihat Ahmet Liman
55 kg	(Armenia) Tigran Minasyan	(Italy) Giovanni Freni	(Russia) Andrei Ivanov
60 kg	(Germany) Andrej Ginc	(Russia) Abu Muslim Amaev	(Armenia) Ararat Manucharyan
60 kg	(Germany) Andrej Ginc	(Russia) Abu Muslim Amaev	(Italy) Jacopo Sandron
63 kg	(Ukraine) Oleksandr Hrushyn	(Belarus) Maksim Nehoda	(Hungary) Krisztian Vancza
63 kg	(Ukraine) Oleksandr Hrushyn	(Belarus) Maksim Nehoda	(Georgia (country)) Leri Abuladze
67 kg	(Belarus) Aliaksandr Liavonchyk	(Georgia (country)) Joni Khetsuriani	(Russia) Miakhdi Iakhiaev
67 kg	(Belarus) Aliaksandr Liavonchyk	(Georgia (country)) Joni Khetsuriani	(Turkey) İsmail Gün
72 kg	(Azerbaijan) Ulvu Ganizade	(Russia) Magomed Yarbilov	(Armenia) Malkhas Amoyan
72 kg	(Azerbaijan) Ulvu Ganizade	(Russia) Magomed Yarbilov	(Hungary) Tamas Levai
77 kg	(Russia) Egor Kadirov	(Bulgaria) Zahari Rosenov Zashev	(Georgia (country)) Beka Guruli
77 kg	(Russia) Egor Kadirov	(Bulgaria) Zahari Rosenov Zashev	(Armenia) Vahe Poghosyan
82 kg	(Russia) Aleksandr Komarov	(Romania) Nicu Samuel Ojog	(Belarus) Kiryl Maskevich
82 kg	(Russia) Aleksandr Komarov	(Romania) Nicu Samuel Ojog	(Ukraine) Vitalii Andriiovych
87 kg	(Georgia (country)) Temuri Tchkuaselidze	(Hungary) Alex Szőke	(Belarus) Ihar Yarashevich
87 kg	(Georgia (country)) Temuri Tchkuaselidze	(Hungary) Alex Szőke	(Russia) Sayd Magomed Abubakarov
97 kg	(Russia) Artur Sargsian	(Austria) Markus Ragginger	(Finland) Arvi Savolainen
97 kg	(Russia) Artur Sargsian	(Austria) Markus Ragginger	(Italy) Luca Svaicari
130 kg	(Russia) Oleg Agakhanov	(Germany) Franz Richter	(Romania) Lenard Istvan Berei
130 kg	(Russia) Oleg Agakhanov	(Germany) Franz Richter	(Armenia) David Ovasapyan

=== Women's freestyle ===
Event	Gold	Silver	Bronze
50 kg	(Russia) Veronika Gurskaya	(Turkey) Aynur Erge	(Italy) Emanuela Liuzzi
50 kg	(Russia) Veronika Gurskaya	(Turkey) Aynur Erge	(Germany) Ellen Riesterer
53 kg	(Turkey) Zeynep Yetgil	(Azerbaijan) Tatyana Varansova	(Romania) Andreea Ana
53 kg	(Turkey) Zeynep Yetgil	(Azerbaijan) Tatyana Varansova	(Russia) Ekaterina Verbina
55 kg	(Russia) Aleksandra Nitsenko	(Belarus) Darya Sinkavets	(Turkey) Eda Tekin
55 kg	(Russia) Aleksandra Nitsenko	(Belarus) Darya Sinkavets	(Ukraine) Khrystyna Demko
57 kg	(Russia) Victoriia Vaulina	(Sweden) Johanna Lindborg	(Ukraine) Alina Hrushyna
57 kg	(Russia) Victoriia Vaulina	(Sweden) Johanna Lindborg	(Germany) Serena Boelke
59 kg	(Moldova) Anastasia Nichita	(Ukraine) Tetiana Rizhko	(Italy) Morena De Vita
59 kg	(Moldova) Anastasia Nichita	(Ukraine) Tetiana Rizhko	(Germany) Debora Lawnitzak
62 kg	(Ukraine) Anhelina Lysak	(Bulgaria) Yuliana Yaneva	(Russia) Daria Bobrulko
62 kg	(Ukraine) Anhelina Lysak	(Bulgaria) Yuliana Yaneva	(Sweden) Linnea Svensson
65 kg	(Ukraine) Oksana Chudyk	(Germany) Eyleen Sewina	(Italy) Elena Esposito
65 kg	(Ukraine) Oksana Chudyk	(Germany) Eyleen Sewina	(Turkey) Aslı Demir
68 kg	(Russia) Khanum Velieva	(Belarus) Yauheniya Andreichykava	(Turkey) Kadriye Aksoy
68 kg	(Russia) Khanum Velieva	(Belarus) Yauheniya Andreichykava	(Ukraine) Alina Levytska
72 kg	(Russia) Evgeniya Zakharchenko	(Italy) Enrica Rinaldi	(Romania) Maria Larisa Nitu
72 kg	(Russia) Evgeniya Zakharchenko	(Italy) Enrica Rinaldi	(Ukraine) Romana Vovchak
76 kg	(Sweden) Denise Makota Ström	(Turkey) Ayşegül Özbege	(Russia) Elmira Khalaeva

Preceded by 2017 Dortmund	European Juniors Wrestling Championships; 2018	Succeeded by 2019 Pontevedra
