= 2024 World Wrestling Championships – Women's freestyle 65 kg =

Wrestling competitions

Women's freestyle 65 kg at the 2024 World Championships
- Venue: Tirana Olympic Park
- Dates: 29–30 October 2024
- Competitors: 19 from 17 nations

Medalists
gold medal	Long Jia	China
silver medal	Kateryna Zelenykh	Romania
bronze medal	Macey Kilty	United States
bronze medal	Miwa Morikawa	Japan

The women's freestyle 65 kilograms was a competition at the 2024 World Wrestling Championships, and was held in Tirana, Albania on 29 and 30 October 2024.

This freestyle wrestling competition uses a single-elimination tournament format, with a repechage to determine the two bronze medal winners. The two finalists compete for gold and silver medals. Each wrestler who loses to one of the finalists advances to the repechage, which culminates in two bronze medal matches. The losers of the semifinal matches each face the remaining repechage opponent from their half of the bracket.

Each bout consists of a single six-minute round, divided into two three-minute halves. The wrestler who scores the most points is declared the winner.

== Results ==
Legend

- F — Won by fall
- WO — Won by walkover

=== Final ===
Final
Kateryna Zelenykh (ROU)	1
Long Jia (CHN)	4^{F}

=== Top half ===
Round of 32
Elis Manolova (AZE)	1
Natalia Kubaty (POL)	1

Round of 16
Macey Kilty (USA)	WO
~~Alexis Gómez (MEX)~~
Elis Manolova (AZE)	0
Kateryna Zelenykh (ROU)	11
Albina Drazhi (ALB)	4
Elma Zeidlere (LAT)	7
Aurora Campagna (ITA)	2
Valeria Dondupova (AIN)	5

Quarterfinals
Macey Kilty (USA)	4
Kateryna Zelenykh (ROU)	11
Elma Zeidlere (LAT)	3
Valeria Dondupova (AIN)	7

Semifinals
Kateryna Zelenykh (ROU)	11^{F}
Valeria Dondupova (AIN)	6

=== Bottom half ===
Round of 32
Long Jia (CHN)	5
Kendra Dacher (FRA)	1
Veranika Ivanova (AIN)	0
Miwa Morikawa (JPN)	8

Round of 16
Irina Kazyulina (KAZ)	2
Manisha Bhanwala (IND)	13
Long Jia (CHN)	5
Tüvshinjargalyn Enkhjin (MGL)	0
Iryna Bondar (UKR)	2
Miwa Morikawa (JPN)	9
Olivia Di Bacco (CAN)	7
Kadriye Aksoy Koçak (TUR)	6^{F}

Quarterfinals
Manisha Bhanwala (IND)	1
Long Jia (CHN)	2^{F}
Miwa Morikawa (JPN)	8
Kadriye Aksoy Koçak (TUR)	0

Semifinals
Long Jia (CHN)	11
Miwa Morikawa (JPN)	1

=== Repechage ===
Repechage round 1
Kendra Dacher (FRA)	7
Tüvshinjargalyn Enkhjin (MGL)	8

Repechage round 2
Elis Manolova (AZE)	2
Macey Kilty (USA)	12
Tüvshinjargalyn Enkhjin (MGL)	2
Manisha Bhanwala (IND)	7

Bronze medals
Macey Kilty (USA)	16
Valeria Dondupova (AIN)	5
Manisha Bhanwala (IND)	2
Miwa Morikawa (JPN)	8

== Final standing ==
Rank	Athlete
1st place, gold medalist(s)	Long Jia (CHN)
2nd place, silver medalist(s)	Kateryna Zelenykh (ROU)
3rd place, bronze medalist(s)	Macey Kilty (USA)
3rd place, bronze medalist(s)	Miwa Morikawa (JPN)
5	Valeria Dondupova (AIN)
5	Manisha Bhanwala (IND)
7	Kadriye Aksoy Koçak (TUR)
8	Elma Zeidlere (LAT)
9	Tüvshinjargalyn Enkhjin (MGL)
10	Elis Manolova (AZE)
11	Kendra Dacher (FRA)
12	Albina Drazhi (ALB)
13	Aurora Campagna (ITA)
14	Iryna Bondar (UKR)
15	Irina Kazyulina (KAZ)
16	Natalia Kubaty (POL)
17	Olivia Di Bacco (CAN)
18	Veranika Ivanova (AIN)
—	Alexis Gómez (MEX)
