= 2021 U23 World Wrestling Championships – Women's freestyle 65 kg =

The women's freestyle 65 kilograms is a competition featured at the 2021 U23 World Wrestling Championships, and was held in Belgrade, Serbia on 4 and 5 November.

Anastasiia Lavrenchuk of Ukraine originally won the gold medal, but was disqualified in March 2024 after a retest of her 2021 sample tested positive for banned substances.

== Medalists ==
Gold	Dinara Salikhova; Russia
Silver	Nisha Dahiya; India
Bronze	Aslı Demir; Turkey
Bronze	Elma Zeidlere; Latvia

== Results ==
Legend

- F — Won by fall
- WO — Won by walkover

=== Final ===
Final
Dinara Salikhova (RUS)	0
~~Anastasiia Lavrenchuk (UKR)~~	4^{F}

=== Top half ===
Round of 32

Round of 16
Birgul Soltanova (AZE)	7
Aina Temirtassova (KAZ)	8
Elena Esposito (ITA)	1
Dinara Salikhova (RUS)	12
Aslı Demir (TUR)	11
Linnea Svensson (SWE)	0
Albina Drazhi (ALB)	10
Izabel Hristova (BUL)	0

Quarterfinals
Aina Temirtassova (KAZ)	0
Dinara Salikhova (RUS)	5^{F}
Aslı Demir (TUR)	10
Albina Drazhi (ALB)	0

Semifinals
Dinara Salikhova (RUS)	5
Aslı Demir (TUR)	3

=== Bottom half ===
Round of 32
~~Winrose Alivisa (KEN)~~
Ashlynn Ortega (USA)	WO
Alina Maksimava (BLR)	3
Khadija Jlassi (TUN)	4

Round of 16
Kamila Kulwicka (POL)	7
Miki Rowbottom (CAN)	2
~~Anastasiia Lavrenchuk (UKR)~~	11
Elma Zeidlere (LAT)	0
Nisha Dahiya (IND)	9^{F}
Eyleen Sewina (GER)	1
Ashlynn Ortega (USA)	4
Khadija Jlassi (TUN)	2

Quarterfinals
Kamila Kulwicka (POL)	0
~~Anastasiia Lavrenchuk (UKR)~~	11
Nisha Dahiya (IND)	9^{F}
Ashlynn Ortega (USA)	3

Semifinals
~~Anastasiia Lavrenchuk (UKR)~~	8
Nisha Dahiya (IND)	4

=== Repechage ===
Repechage round 1
Elena Esposito (ITA)	6
Aina Temirtassova (KAZ)	0
Elma Zeidlere (LAT)	11
Kamila Kulwicka (POL)	4

Bronze medals
Elena Esposito (ITA)	2
Aslı Demir (TUR)	3
Elma Zeidlere (LAT)	0
Nisha Dahiya (IND)	10
