= Wang Xiaoqian =

Chinese freestyle wrestler

Personal information
- Born: 1996 (age 29–30)
- Height: 174 cm (5 ft 9 in)

Sport
- Country: China
- Sport: Amateur wrestling
- Event: Freestyle
Medal record
Women's freestyle wrestling
Representing China
World Championships
| Bronze medal – third place | 2019 Nur-Sultan | 65 kg |
Asian Championships
| Bronze medal – third place | 2017 New Delhi | 63 kg |
World U23 Wrestling Championships
| Silver medal – second place | 2019 Budapest | 72 kg |
| Bronze medal – third place | 2018 Bucharest | 72 kg |

Wang Xiaoqian (born 1996) is a Chinese freestyle wrestler. She won one of the bronze medals in the women's 65 kg event at the 2019 World Wrestling Championships held in Nur-Sultan, Kazakhstan.

== Career ==
In 2014, she competed in the women's freestyle 63 kg event at the 2014 World Wrestling Championships held in Tashkent, Uzbekistan. In 2017, she won one of the bronze medals in the 63 kg event at the 2017 Asian Wrestling Championships held in New Delhi, India. In 2018, she won one of the bronze medals in the 72 kg event at the 2018 World U23 Wrestling Championship held in Bucharest, Romania.

At the 2019 World U23 Wrestling Championship held in Budapest, Hungary, she won the silver medal in the 72 kg event.

== Major results ==
| Year | Tournament | Location | Result | Event |
|---|---|---|---|---|
| 2017 | Asian Championships | New Delhi, India | 3rd | Freestyle 63 kg |
| 2019 | World Championships | Nur-Sultan, Kazakhstan | 3rd | Freestyle 65 kg |
