= 2021 World Wrestling Championships – Women's freestyle 65 kg =

Wrestling competitions

Women's freestyle 65 kg at the 2021 World Championships
- Venue: Nye Jordal Amfi
- Dates: 5–6 October 2021
- Competitors: 19 from 19 nations

Medalists
gold medal	Irina Rîngaci	Moldova
silver medal	Miwa Morikawa	Japan
bronze medal	Johanna Mattsson	Sweden
bronze medal	Forrest Molinari	United States

The women's freestyle 65 kilograms is a competition featured at the 2021 World Wrestling Championships, and was held in Oslo, Norway on 5 and 6 October.

This freestyle wrestling competition consists of a single-elimination tournament, with a repechage used to determine the winner of two bronze medals. The two finalists face off for gold and silver medals. Each wrestler who loses to one of the two finalists moves into the repechage, culminating in a pair of bronze medal matches featuring the semifinal losers each facing the remaining repechage opponent from their half of the bracket.

== Results ==
Legend

- F — Won by fall
- WO — Won by walkover

=== Final ===
Final
Irina Rîngaci (MDA)	8
Miwa Morikawa (JPN)	6

=== Top half ===
Round of 32

Round of 16
Irina Rîngaci (MDA)	11
Eyleen Sewina (GER)	0
Ahn Hye-bin (KOR)	0
Johanna Mattsson (SWE)	8^{F}
Aslı Demir (TUR)	4^{F}
Winrose Alivisa (KEN)	0
Mimi Hristova (BUL)	8^{F}
Kamila Kulwicka (POL)	6

Quarterfinals
Irina Rîngaci (MDA)	6
Johanna Mattsson (SWE)	2
Aslı Demir (TUR)	2
Mimi Hristova (BUL)	7

Semifinals
Irina Rîngaci (MDA)	4^{F}
Mimi Hristova (BUL)	8

=== Bottom half ===
Round of 32
Dinara Kudaeva (RWF)	8
Bhateri Lakhwan (IND)	0
Tüvshinjargalyn Enkhjin (MGL)	0
Forrest Molinari (USA)	5^{F}
Elis Manolova (AZE)	1
Koumba Larroque (FRA)	1

Round of 16
Kriszta Incze (ROU)	2
Aina Temirtassova (KAZ)	7
Miwa Morikawa (JPN)	5
Maryia Mamashuk (BLR)	0
Dinara Kudaeva (RWF)	0
Forrest Molinari (USA)	10
Koumba Larroque (FRA)	4
Tetiana Rizhko (UKR)	3

Quarterfinals
Aina Temirtassova (KAZ)	2
Miwa Morikawa (JPN)	6
Forrest Molinari (USA)	3
Koumba Larroque (FRA)	3

Semifinals
Miwa Morikawa (JPN)	6
Forrest Molinari (USA)	2

=== Repechage ===
Repechage round 2
Eyleen Sewina (GER)	0
Johanna Mattsson (SWE)	6^{F}
Maryia Mamashuk (BLR)	4^{F}
Aina Temirtassova (KAZ)	0

Bronze medals
Johanna Mattsson (SWE)	WO
Mimi Hristova (BUL)
Maryia Mamashuk (BLR)	1
Forrest Molinari (USA)	12

== Final standing ==
Rank	Athlete
1st place, gold medalist(s)	Irina Rîngaci (MDA)
2nd place, silver medalist(s)	Miwa Morikawa (JPN)
3rd place, bronze medalist(s)	Johanna Mattsson (SWE)
3rd place, bronze medalist(s)	Forrest Molinari (USA)
5	Mimi Hristova (BUL)
5	Maryia Mamashuk (BLR)
7	Koumba Larroque (FRA)
8	Aslı Demir (TUR)
9	Aina Temirtassova (KAZ)
10	Dinara Kudaeva (RWF)
11	Tetiana Rizhko (UKR)
12	Kriszta Incze (ROU)
13	Elis Manolova (AZE)
14	Kamila Kulwicka (POL)
15	Winrose Alivisa (KEN)
16	Tüvshinjargalyn Enkhjin (MGL)
17	Ahn Hye-bin (KOR)
18	Bhateri Lakhwan (IND)
19	Eyleen Sewina (GER)
