= 2024 U23 World Wrestling Championships – Women's freestyle 62 kg =

Wrestling competitions

Women's freestyle 62 kg at the 2024 U23 World Championships
- Venue: Tirana Olympic Park
- Dates: 24–25 October
- Competitors: 18 from 16 nations

Medalists
gold medal	Iryna Bondar	Ukraine
silver medal	Macey Kilty	United States
bronze medal	Esther Kolawole	Nigeria
bronze medal	Olha Padoshyk	Poland

The women's freestyle 62 is a competition featured at the 2024 U23 World Wrestling Championships, and will be held in Tirana, Albania on 24 and 25 October 2024.

This freestyle wrestling competition consists of a single-elimination tournament, with a repechage used to determine the winner of two bronze medals. The two finalists face off for gold and silver medals. Each wrestler who loses to one of the two finalists moves into the repechage, culminating in a pair of bronze medal matches featuring the semifinal losers each facing the remaining repechage opponent from their half of the bracket.

== Results ==
Legend

- F — Won by fall

=== Final ===
Final
Macey Kilty (USA)	3
Iryna Bondar (UKR)	12

=== Top half ===
Round of 32
Tynys Dubek (KAZ)	0
Macey Kilty (USA)	3^{F}

Round of 16
Astrid Montero (VEN)	16
Ekaterina Koshkina (AIN)	6
Macey Kilty (USA)	3^{F}
Esther Kolawole (NGR)	3
Viktoria Vesso (EST)	6^{F}
Karoline Ortiz (PUR)	0
Kalmira Bilimbek Kyzy (KGZ)	1
Ruzanna Mammadova (AZE)	4

Quarterfinals
Astrid Montero (VEN)	0
Macey Kilty (USA)	10
Viktoria Vesso (EST)	7
Ruzanna Mammadova (AZE)	1

Semifinals
Macey Kilty (USA)	12
Viktoria Vesso (EST)	2

=== Bottom half ===
Round of 32
Iris Thiébaux (FRA)	2
Boldsaikhan Khongorzul (MGL)	12

Round of 16
Olha Padoshyk (POL)	10^{F}
Nayu Uchida (JPN)	0
Iryna Bondar (UKR)	10
Ineta Dantaitė (LTU)	0
Zhang Hanying (CHN)	6
Boldsaikhan Khongorzul (MGL)	4
Selvi İlyasoğlu (TUR)	4
Nadzeya Bulanaya (AIN)	3

Quarterfinals
Olha Padoshyk (POL)	0
Iryna Bondar (UKR)	10
Zhang Hanying (CHN)	8^{F}
Selvi İlyasoğlu (TUR)	5

Semifinals
Iryna Bondar (UKR)	2
Zhang Hanying (CHN)	1

=== Repechage ===
Repechage round 1
Tynys Dubek (KAZ)	0
Esther Kolawole (NGR)	10

Repechage round 2
Esther Kolawole (NGR)	10
Astrid Montero (VEN)	0
Ineta Dantaitė (LTU)	1
Olha Padoshyk (POL)	2^{F}

Bronze medals
Esther Kolawole (NGR)	10
Viktoria Vesso (EST)	0
Olha Padoshyk (POL)	2^{F}
Zhang Hanying (CHN)	0

== Final standing ==
Rank	Athlete
1st place, gold medalist(s)	Iryna Bondar (UKR)
2nd place, silver medalist(s)	Macey Kilty (USA)
3rd place, bronze medalist(s)	Esther Kolawole (NGR)
3rd place, bronze medalist(s)	Olha Padoshyk (POL)
5	Viktoria Vesso (EST)
5	Zhang Hanying (CHN)
7	Boldsaikhan Khongorzul (MGL)
8	Astrid Montero (VEN)
9	Ruzanna Mammadova (AZE)
10	Selvi İlyasoğlu (TUR)
11	Ekaterina Koshkina (AIN)
12	Nadzeya Bulanaya (AIN)
13	Iris Thiébaux (FRA)
14	Kalmira Bilimbek Kyzy (KGZ)
15	Ineta Dantaitė (LTU)
16	Karoline Ortiz (PUR)
17	Nayu Uchida (JPN)
18	Tynys Dubek (KAZ)
