= Forrest Molinari =

American freestyle wrestler and mixed martial artist

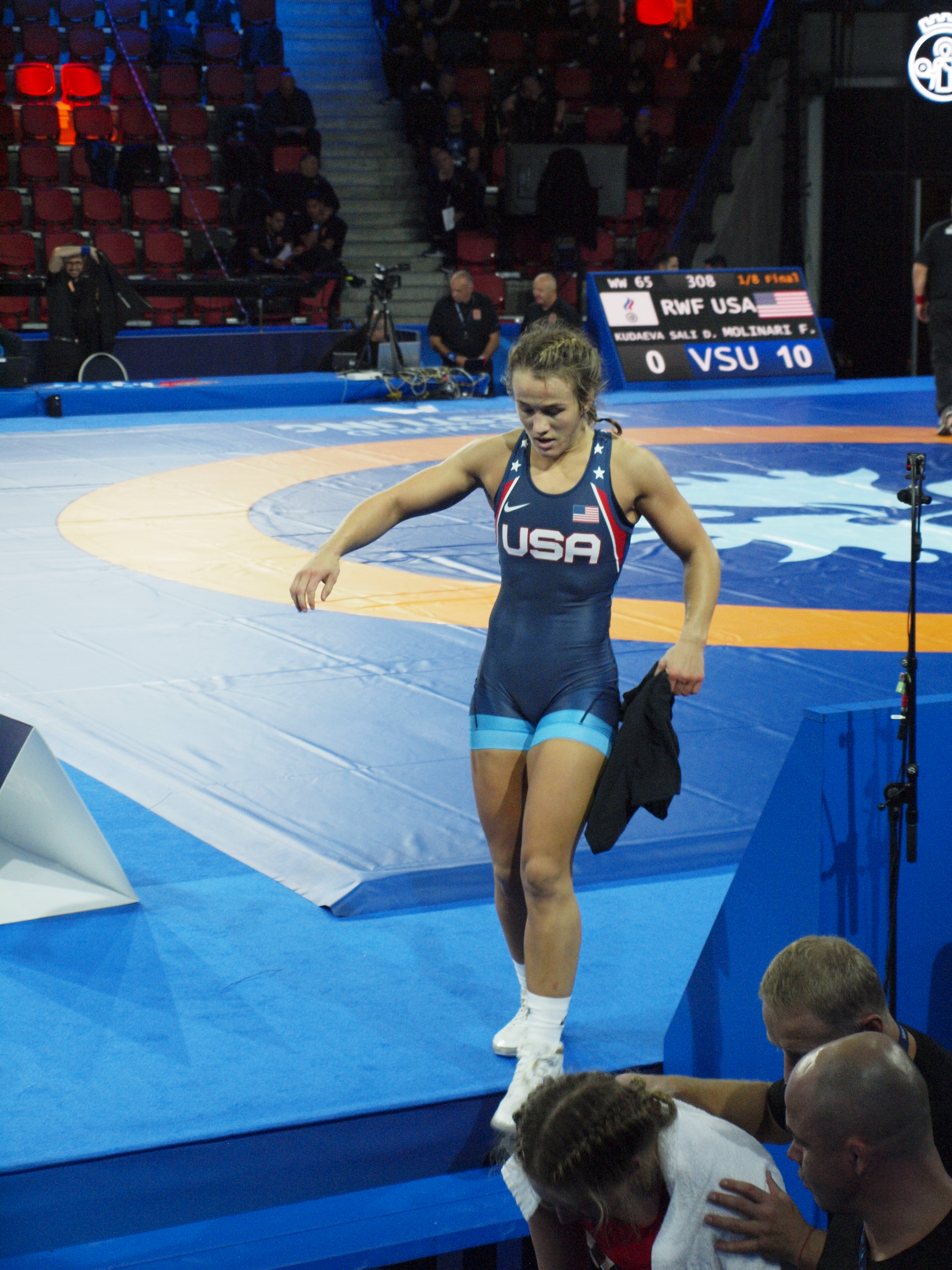
- Molinari in 2021
- Born: September 4, 1995 (age 31); Walnut Creek, California, United States
- Other names: Forrest Ann Molinari
- Height: 5 ft 7 in (1.70 m)
- Weight: 145 lb (66 kg; 10.4 st)
- Division: 65 kg (wrestling); 68 kg (wrestling); Featherweight (MMA) (2024–present)
- Style: Wrestling
- Team: The MMA Lab (2024–present)
- Trainer: Mark Perry
- Years active: 2024–present (MMA)

Mixed martial arts record
- Total: 1
- Wins: 1
- By decision: 1
- Losses: 0

Other information
- University: Missouri Baptist University; King University
- Notable club: Hawkeye Wrestling Club (wrestling)
- Mixed martial arts record from Sherdog

Forrest Ann Molinari (born September 4, 1995) is an American freestyle wrestler and mixed martial artist. She won one of the bronze medals in the women's 65 kg event at the 2021 World Wrestling Championships held in Oslo, Norway. She is a four-time medalist, including three gold medals, at the Pan American Wrestling Championships.

== Background ==
Growing up playing baseball and swimming among various other sports, she wanted to play football coming as a freshman into Benicia High School. However, her stature was too small for the sport, so she started wrestling after a suggestion by her mother and football coach. She went on to become a two-time state medalist in the sport and gaining college scholarship to Missouri Baptist University after graduating from Benicia in 2013. She then transferred to King University where she won national championship in her junior year and gaining four All-American honors in women's collegiate wrestling overall.

== Wrestling career ==
Molinari competed in the women's 67 kg event at the 2015 World Junior Wrestling Championships held in Salvador da Bahia, Brazil. At the 2017 Pan American Wrestling Championships held in Lauro de Freitas, Brazil, she won one of the bronze medals in the women's 69 kg event.

Molinari competed in the women's freestyle event of the Wrestling World Cup in 2017, 2018 and 2019. In 2018, she lost her bronze medal match in the women's 65 kg event at the Klippan Lady Open in Klippan, Sweden. A few months later, Molinari won the gold medal in this event at the 2018 Pan American Wrestling Championships held in Lima, Peru. She lost her bronze medal match in both the women's 65 kg event at the 2018 World Wrestling Championships held in Budapest, Hungary and in the same event at the 2019 World Wrestling Championships held in Nur-Sultan, Kazakhstan. In 2019, Molinari defeated Maya Nelson in the women's 65 kg event at the Final X: Rutgers event held in Piscataway, New Jersey, United States. A month later, she won the gold medal in the women's 65 kg event at the 2019 Yasar Dogu Tournament held in Istanbul, Turkey.

In 2020, at the Golden Grand Prix Ivan Yarygin held in Krasnoyarsk, Russia, she won one of the bronze medals in the women's 68 kg event.

In January 2021, Molinari won the silver medal in the women's 68 kg event at the Grand Prix de France Henri Deglane held in Nice, France. In June 2021, she won one of the bronze medals in the women's 68 kg event at the 2021 Poland Open held in Warsaw, Poland. A few months later, Molinari won one of the bronze medals in the women's 65 kg event at the World Wrestling Championships held in Oslo, Norway. She defeated Maryia Mamashuk of Belarus in her bronze medal match.

In January 2022, Molinari won the silver medal in the women's 65 kg event at the Golden Grand Prix Ivan Yarygin held in Krasnoyarsk, Russia. In February 2022, she won the gold medal in the women's 65 kg event at the Yasar Dogu Tournament held in Istanbul, Turkey. Molinari won the gold medal in her event at the 2022 Pan American Wrestling Championships held in Acapulco, Mexico.

Molinari won one of the bronze medals in the women's 68 kg event at the Grand Prix de France Henri Deglane 2023 held in Nice, France. She won the gold medal in her event at the 2023 Ibrahim Moustafa Tournament held in Alexandria, Egypt. A few months later, Molinari also won the gold medal in her event at the 2023 Pan American Wrestling Championships held in Buenos Aires, Argentina.

Molinari won the gold medal in the women's 68 kg event at the 2023 Pan American Games held in Santiago, Chile. She defeated Soleymi Caraballo of Venezuela in her gold medal match.

She won the silver medal in her event at the 2024 Grand Prix Zagreb Open held in Zagreb, Croatia.

She attended 2024 United States Olympic Trials where she advanced to the finals, but lost both matches to Amit Elor who would eventually win gold in the 2024 Summer Olympics.

== Achievements ==
Year	Tournament	Location	Result	Event
2017	Pan American Wrestling Championships	Lauro de Freitas, Brazil	3rd	Freestyle 69 kg
2018	Pan American Wrestling Championships	Lima, Peru	1st	Freestyle 65 kg
2021	World Championships	Oslo, Norway	3rd	Freestyle 65 kg
2022	Pan American Wrestling Championships	Acapulco, Mexico	1st	Freestyle 65 kg
2023	Pan American Wrestling Championships	Buenos Aires, Argentina	1st	Freestyle 68 kg
2023	Pan American Games	Santiago, Chile	1st	Freestyle 68 kg

== Mixed martial arts career ==
After losing the finals of the olympic trials, Molinari decided to pursue a career in mixed martial arts and joined The MMA Lab.

She made her professional debut in the sport against Brigid Chase at Borroka 1 on November 22, 2024, winning the bout via unanimous decision.

== Mixed martial arts record ==
Professional record breakdown
1 match	1 win	0 losses
By decision	1	0

Res.	Record	Opponent	Method	Event	Date	Round	Time	Location	Notes
Win	1–0	Brigid Chase	Decision (unanimous)	Borroka 1	November 22, 2024	3	5:00	Las Vegas, Nevada, United States	Featherweight debut.
