= 2025 European Wrestling Championships – Women's freestyle 68 kg =

Wrestling competition

Women's freestyle 68 kg at the 2025 European Wrestling Championships
- Venue: X-Bionic Sphere
- Location: Bratislava, Slovakia
- Dates: 9-10 April
- Competitors: 13

Medalists
gold medal	Alina Shauchuk
silver medal	Kateryna Zelenykh	Romania
bronze medal	Buse Tosun Çavuşoğlu	Turkey
bronze medal	Adéla Hanzlíčková	Czech Republic

The women's freestyle 68 kg is a competition featured at the 2025 European Wrestling Championships, and was held in Bratislava, Slovakia on April 9 and 10.

== Results ==
Legend

- F — Won by fall

=== Main bracket ===
Round of 16
Albina Drazhi (ALB)	0
Alina Shauchuk (UWW)	10
Kendra Dacher (FRA)	10
Nerea Pampín (ESP)	0
Manola Skobelska (UKR)	4^{F}
Elizaveta Petliakova (UWW)	1
Sophia Schäfle (GER)	4^{F}
Michaela Šeböková (SVK)	0
Adéla Hanzlíčková (CZE)	11
Tindra Sjöberg (SWE)	0

Quarterfinals
Buse Tosun Çavuşoğlu (TUR)	2
Alina Shauchuk (UWW)	3
Kendra Dacher (FRA)	5
Manola Skobelska (UKR)	6
Kateryna Zelenykh (ROU)	6^{F}
Sophia Schäfle (GER)	0
Adéla Hanzlíčková (CZE)	6
Noémi Szabados (HUN)	2

Semifinals
Alina Shauchuk (UWW)	2
Manola Skobelska (UKR)	1
Kateryna Zelenykh (ROU)	11
Adéla Hanzlíčková (CZE)	3

Final
Alina Shauchuk (UWW)	2
Kateryna Zelenykh (ROU)	2

=== Repechage ===
Repechage round 1
Albina Drazhi (ALB)	0
Buse Tosun Çavuşoğlu (TUR)	10

Bronze medal match
Buse Tosun Çavuşoğlu (TUR)	9
Manola Skobelska (UKR)	6
Sophia Schäfle (GER)	0
Adéla Hanzlíčková (CZE)	12

== Final standing ==
Rank	Athlete
1st place, gold medalist(s)	Alina Shauchuk (UWW)
2nd place, silver medalist(s)	Kateryna Zelenykh (ROU)
3rd place, bronze medalist(s)	Buse Tosun Çavuşoğlu (TUR)
3rd place, bronze medalist(s)	Adéla Hanzlíčková (CZE)
5	Manola Skobelska (UKR)
5	Sophia Schäfle (GER)
7	Kendra Dacher (FRA)
8	Noémi Szabados (HUN)
9	Elizaveta Petliakova (UWW)
10	Michaela Šeböková (SVK)
11	Nerea Pampín (ESP)
12	Tindra Sjöberg (SWE)
13	Albina Drazhi (ALB)
