= 2024 U23 World Wrestling Championships – Women's freestyle 65 kg =

Wrestling competitions

Women's freestyle 65 kg at the 2024 U23 World Championships
- Venue: Tirana Olympic Park
- Dates: 24–25 October
- Competitors: 20 from 18 nations

Medalists
gold medal	Irina Rîngaci	Moldova
silver medal	Alina Kasabieva	Authorised Neutral Athletes
bronze medal	Shiksha Kharb	India
bronze medal	Kateryna Zelenykh	Romania

The women's freestyle 65 is a competition featured at the 2024 U23 World Wrestling Championships, and will be held in Tirana, Albania on 24 and 25 October 2024.

This freestyle wrestling competition consists of a single-elimination tournament, with a repechage used to determine the winner of two bronze medals. The two finalists face off for gold and silver medals. Each wrestler who loses to one of the two finalists moves into the repechage, culminating in a pair of bronze medal matches featuring the semifinal losers each facing the remaining repechage opponent from their half of the bracket.

== Results ==
Legend

- F — Won by fall

=== Final ===
Final
Irina Rîngaci (MDA)	10
Alina Kasabieva (AIN)	3

=== Top half ===
Round of 32
Pai Hsin-ping (TPE)	10
Angelina Ellis-Toddington (CAN)	5^{F}
Kleona Shabani (ALB)	0
Shiksha Kharb (IND)	4^{F}

Round of 16
Irina Rîngaci (MDA)	2^{F}
Rin Teramoto (JPN)	0
Angelina Ellis-Toddington (CAN)	2
Dilnaz Sazanova (KGZ)	3
Laura Godino (ITA)	0
Shiksha Kharb (IND)	12^{F}
Kseniya Tsiarenia (AIN)	7^{F}
Batsükhiin Gantsetseg (MGL)	5

Quarterfinals
Irina Rîngaci (MDA)	4^{F}
Dilnaz Sazanova (KGZ)	0
Shiksha Kharb (IND)	9
Kseniya Tsiarenia (AIN)	5

Semifinals
Irina Rîngaci (MDA)	10
Shiksha Kharb (IND)	0

=== Bottom half ===
Round of 32
Kateryna Zelenykh (ROU)	5
Adaugo Nwachukwu (USA)	5
Karolina Pók (HUN)	0
Alina Kasabieva (AIN)	7

Round of 16
Rao Yuqi (CHN)	12
Duygu Gen (TUR)	1
Kateryna Zelenykh (ROU)	4^{F}
Guldana Osserbay (KAZ)	0
Sofiia Kushnir (UKR)	0
Alina Kasabieva (AIN)	5^{F}
Ingrid Skard (NOR)	1
Maša Perović (SRB)	2

Quarterfinals
Rao Yuqi (CHN)	2
Kateryna Zelenykh (ROU)	6
Alina Kasabieva (AIN)	11
Maša Perović (SRB)	0

Semifinals
Kateryna Zelenykh (ROU)	2
Alina Kasabieva (AIN)	3

=== Repechage ===
Repechage round 1
Karolina Pók (HUN)	9
Sofiia Kushnir (UKR)	0

Repechage round 2
Rin Teramoto (JPN)	10
Dilnaz Sazanova (KGZ)	0
Karolina Pók (HUN)	9
Maša Perović (SRB)	0

Bronze medals
Rin Teramoto (JPN)	3
Shiksha Kharb (IND)	6
Karolina Pók (HUN)	0
Kateryna Zelenykh (ROU)	4^{F}

== Final standing ==
Rank	Athlete
1st place, gold medalist(s)	Irina Rîngaci (MDA)
2nd place, silver medalist(s)	Alina Kasabieva (AIN)
3rd place, bronze medalist(s)	Shiksha Kharb (IND)
3rd place, bronze medalist(s)	Kateryna Zelenykh (ROU)
5	Rin Teramoto (JPN)
5	Karolina Pók (HUN)
7	Kseniya Tsiarenia (AIN)
8	Angelina Ellis-Toddington (CAN)
9	Rao Yuqi (CHN)
10	Dilnaz Sazanova (KGZ)
11	Maša Perović (SRB)
12	Adaugo Nwachukwu (USA)
13	Ingrid Skard (NOR)
14	Duygu Gen (TUR)
15	Pai Hsin-ping (TPE)
16	Batsükhiin Gantsetseg (MGL)
17	Kleona Shabani (ALB)
18	Guldana Osserbay (KAZ)
19	Laura Godino (ITA)
20	Sofiia Kushnir (UKR)
