= Miwa Morikawa =

Japanese freestyle wrestler

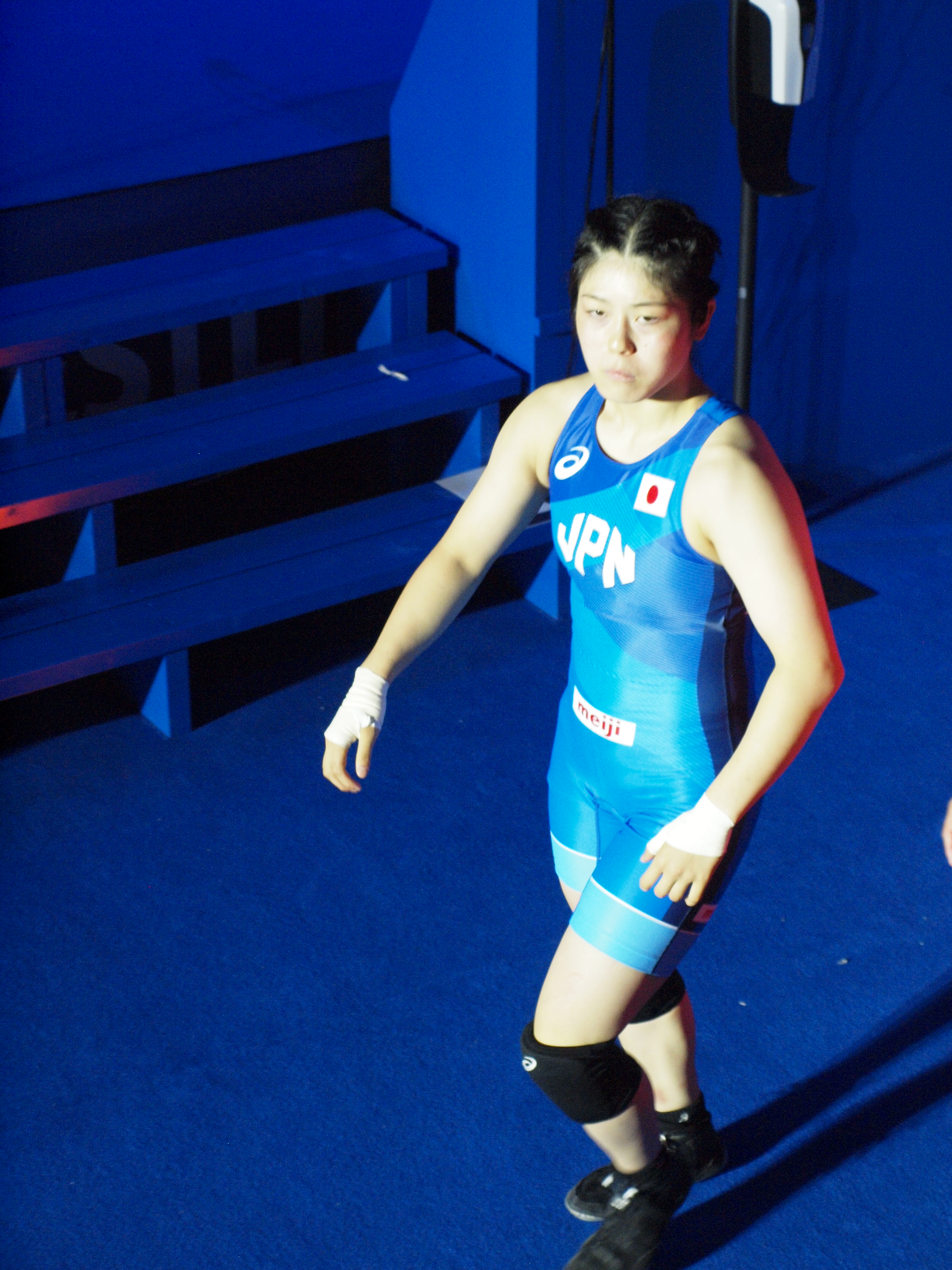
- Miwa Morikawa at the 2021 World Wrestling Championships in Oslo, Norway

Personal information
- Born: 22 July 1999 (age 27) Shizuoka Prefecture, Japan

Sport
- Country: Japan
- Sport: Amateur wrestling
- Weight class: 65 kg
- Event: Freestyle
Medal record
Women's freestyle wrestling
Representing Japan
World Championships
| Gold medal – first place | 2022 Belgrade | 65 kg |
| Gold medal – first place | 2025 Zagreb | 65 kg |
| Silver medal – second place | 2021 Oslo | 65 kg |
| Bronze medal – third place | 2023 Belgrade | 72 kg |
| Bronze medal – third place | 2024 Tirana | 65 kg |
Asian Championships
| Gold medal – first place | 2022 Ulaanbaatar | 65 kg |
| Gold medal – first place | 2025 Amman | 65 kg |
| Silver medal – second place | 2026 Bishkek | 68 kg |
Grand Prix
| Gold medal – first place | 2025 Tirana | 65 kg |
| Gold medal – first place | 2026 Zagreb | 68 kg |
| Silver medal – second place | 2018 Klippan | 65 kg |
World U23 Championships
| Gold medal – first place | 2022 Pontevedra | 65 kg |
| Silver medal – second place | 2018 Bucharest | 68 kg |

Miwa Morikawa is a Japanese freestyle wrestler. She won the gold medal in the 65 kg event at the 2022 World Wrestling Championships held in Belgrade, Serbia.

== Career ==
In 2018, Morikawa won the silver medal in the women's 65 kg event at the Klippan Lady Open in Klippan, Sweden.

She won the silver medal in the women's 65 kg event at the 2021 World Wrestling Championships held in Oslo, Norway.

Morikawa won the gold medal in her event at the 2022 Asian Wrestling Championships held in Ulaanbaatar, Mongolia. She also won the gold medal in her event at the 2022 U23 World Wrestling Championships held in Pontevedra, Spain.

In 2023, Morikawa won one of the bronze medals in the women's 72 kg event at the World Wrestling Championships held in Belgrade, Serbia, behind gold medal winner Amit Elor of the United States and silver medal winner Enkh-Amaryn Davaanasan of Mongolia. She defeated Kendra Dacher of France in her bronze medal match.

== Achievements ==
| Year | Tournament | Location | Result | Event |
|---|---|---|---|---|
| 2021 | World Championships | Oslo, Norway | 2nd | Freestyle 65 kg |
| 2022 | Asian Championships | Ulaanbaatar, Mongolia | 1st | Freestyle 65 kg |
| 2022 | World Championships | Belgrade, Serbia | 1st | Freestyle 65 kg |
| 2023 | World Championships | Belgrade, Serbia | 3rd | Freestyle 72 kg |
| 2024 | World Championships | Tirana, Albania | 3rd | Freestyle 65 kg |
| 2025 | Asian Championships | Amman, Jordan | 1st | Freestyle 65 kg |
| 2025 | World Championships | Zagreb, Croatia | 1st | Freestyle 65 kg |
