= 2021 U23 World Wrestling Championships – Women's freestyle 62 kg =

The women's freestyle 62 kilograms is a competition featured at the 2021 U23 World Wrestling Championships, and was held in Belgrade, Serbia on 4 and 5 November.

== Medalists ==
Gold	Ana Godinez; Canada
Silver	Kateryna Zelenykh; Ukraine
Bronze	Anastasia Parokhina; Russia
Bronze	Radhika Jaglan; India

== Results ==
Legend

- F — Won by fall

=== Main bracket ===
Round of 16
Irina Kuznetsova (KAZ)	0
Ana Godinez (CAN)	5
Ana Fabijan (SRB)	6
Zhala Aliyeva (AZE)	3
Tatsiana Paulava (BLR)	5
Améline Douarre (FRA)	3
Aurora Campagna (ITA)	4^{F}
Zineb Hassoune (MAR)	0
Emma Bruntil (USA)	8
Yağmur Çakmak (TUR)	3
Raya Kyoseva (BUL)	0
Radhika Jaglan (IND)	11
Pai Hsin-ping (TPE)	2
Kateryna Zelenykh (UKR)	4^{F}

Quarterfinals
Anastasia Parokhina (RUS)	0
Ana Godinez (CAN)	6
Ana Fabijan (SRB)	6
Tatsiana Paulava (BLR)	5
Aurora Campagna (ITA)	11
Emma Bruntil (USA)	0
Radhika Jaglan (IND)	0
Kateryna Zelenykh (UKR)	2^{F}

Semifinals
Ana Godinez (CAN)	10
Ana Fabijan (SRB)	0
Aurora Campagna (ITA)	2
Kateryna Zelenykh (UKR)	3

Final
Ana Godinez (CAN)	10
Kateryna Zelenykh (UKR)	7

=== Repechage ===
Repechage round
Irina Kuznetsova (KAZ)	1
Anastasia Parokhina (RUS)	7
Pai Hsin-ping (TPE)	2
Radhika Jaglan (IND)	13

Bronze medals
Anastasia Parokhina (RUS)	8
Ana Fabijan (SRB)	1
Radhika Jaglan (IND)	6
Aurora Campagna (ITA)	4
