= Ayana Gempei =

Japanese freestyle wrestler

Sport
- Country: Japan
- Sport: Amateur wrestling
- Event: Freestyle
Medal record
Women's freestyle wrestling
Representing Japan
World Championships
Bronze medal – third place	2018 Budapest	65 kg
Asian Championships
Silver medal – second place	2017 New Delhi	63 kg
World U23 Championships
Gold medal – first place	2017 Bydgoszcz	63 kg
Gold medal – first place	2018 Bucharest	65 kg

Ayana Gempei (Japanese: 源平 彩南; born 1 June 1996) is a Japanese freestyle wrestler. She won one of the bronze medals in the 65 kg event at the 2018 World Wrestling Championships held in Budapest, Hungary.

== Career ==
At the 2017 Asian Wrestling Championships held in New Delhi, India, she won the silver medal in the 63 kg event. At the 2018 World U23 Wrestling Championship held in Bucharest, Romania, she won the gold medal in the 65 kg event. In 2018, Gempei also competed in the 68 kg event at the Asian Games without winning a medal; she lost her bronze medal match against Meerim Zhumanazarova of Kyrgyzstan.

== Achievements ==
Year	Tournament	Location	Result	Event
2017	Asian Championships	New Delhi, India	2nd	Freestyle 63 kg
2018	World Championships	Budapest, Hungary	3rd	Freestyle 65 kg
