= Ali Aliyev Sport Complex =

Indoor sporting arena located in Russia

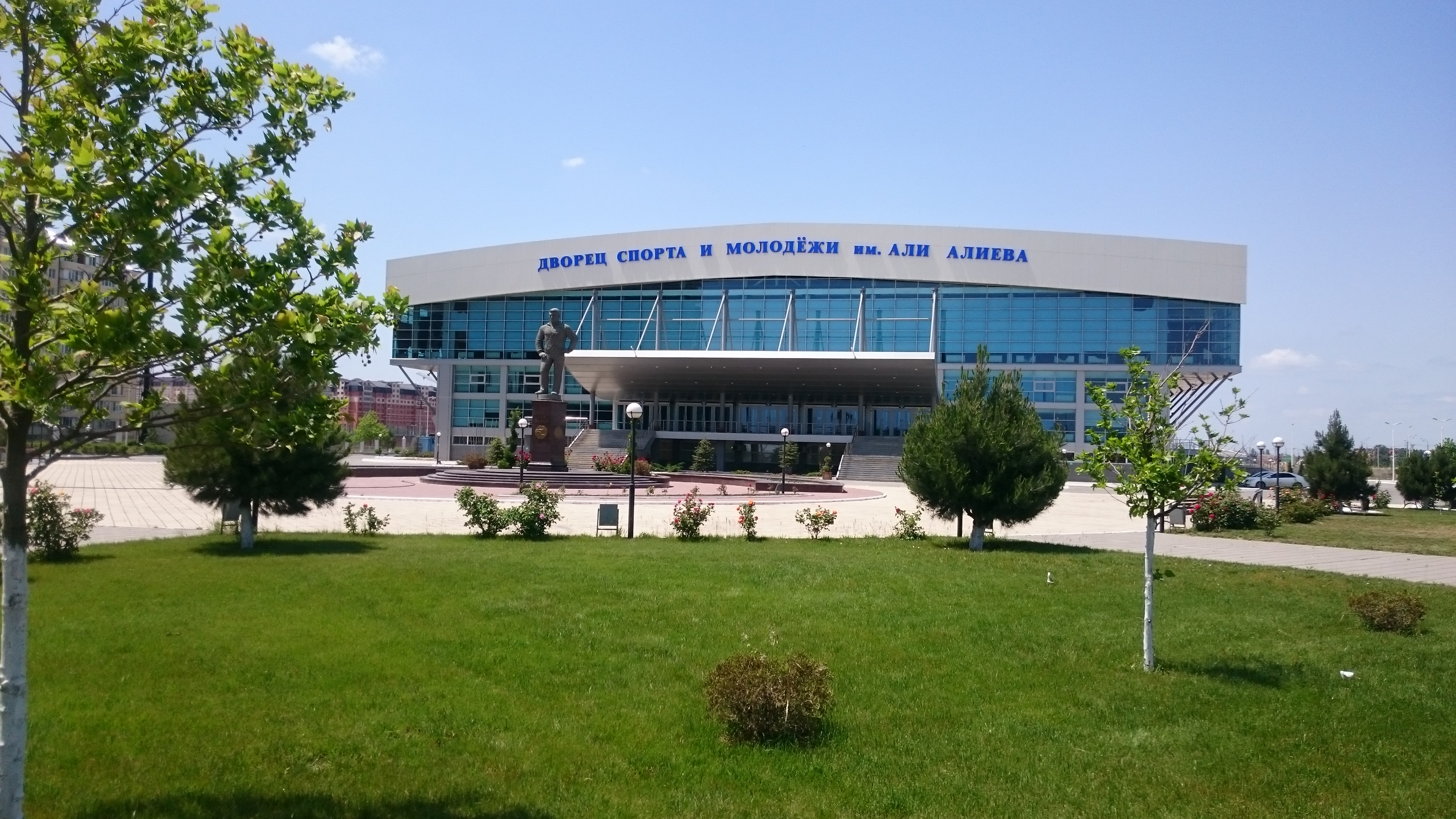
- Location: Kaspiysk, Dagestan, Russia
- Capacity: 5,000 (volleyball/judo); 6,000 (boxing)

Construction
- Opened: 2011

Ali Aliyev Sport Complex (Arena) (Russian: Спорткомплекс имени Али Алиева) is an indoor sports arena situated in Kaspiysk, Russia. The arena usually hosts basketball, volleyball, judo, futsal. It also hosts other tournaments with high attendance.

== History ==
The arena was built on 22 may, 2011 in Kaspiysk close to the capital city of Dagestan Makhachkala. This arena was named in memory of the first freestyle wrestling world champion of Dagestan: Ali Aliyev. The first event was held in the arena was the FILA freestyle wrestling world cup 2011.

This arena hosts an international freestyle wrestling tournament in memory of Ali Aliyev.

== Events & tournaments ==
- Freestyle wrestling world cup 2011.
- 2014 Russian volleyball cup semi-finals.
- Fight Nights: Dagestan.
- 2015 Russian National Freestyle Wrestling Championships.
- 2018 European Wrestling Championships.
- Fight Nights Global 94.
- 2023 Russian National Freestyle Wrestling Championships.
