= 2020 Individual Wrestling World Cup – Women's freestyle 59 kg =

The Women's freestyle 59 kg is a competition featured at the 2020 Individual Wrestling World Cup, and was held in Belgrade, Serbia on 15 and 16 December 2020.

== Medalists ==
Gold	Svetlana Lipatova; Russia
Silver	Mariana Cherdivara; Moldova
Bronze	Magdalena Głodek; Poland
Bronze	Kateryna Zelenykh; Ukraine

== Results ==
Legend

- F — Won by fall

Quarterfinals		Semifinals		Final
Magdalena Głodek (POL)	2
Svetlana Lipatova (RUS)	6	Svetlana Lipatova (RUS)	2
Sarita Mor (IND)	2	Sandra Paruszewski (GER)	2
Sandra Paruszewski (GER)	9			Svetlana Lipatova (RUS)	2
Mariana Cherdivara (MDA)	4^{F}			Mariana Cherdivara (MDA)	1
Kateryna Zelenykh (UKR)	11	Mariana Cherdivara (MDA)	4
Elif Yanık (TUR)	2^{F}	Elif Yanık (TUR)	0
Ana Fabijan (SRB)	0

Bronze medals
Magdalena Głodek (POL)	8
Sandra Paruszewski (GER)	7
Kateryna Zelenykh (UKR)	10
Elif Yanık (TUR)	0
