= Nisha Dahiya =

Indian freestyle wrestler (born 1998)

Personal information
- Born: 18 October 1998 (age 28) Adiyana, Haryana, India
- Employer: Indian Railways

Sport
- Sport: Wrestling
- Weight class: 68 kg
- Event: Freestyle
- Club: Inspire Institute of Sport
Medal record
Women's freestyle wrestling
Representing India
Asian Championships
| Silver medal – second place | 2023 Astana | 68 kg |
Grand Prix
| Bronze medal – third place | 2026 Zagreb | 68 kg |
World U23 Championships
| Silver medal – second place | 2021 Belgrade | 65 kg |

Nisha Dahiya (born 18 October 1998) is an Indian freestyle wrestler. She has won silver medals at the 2023 Asian Championships and the 2021 U23 World Championships.

== Early life ==
Nisha Dahiya was born in Adiyana village in Panipat district, Haryana. Raised in a modest household, she grew up in a region where wrestling was widely practised. Her father, Ramesh Dahiya, encouraged her from a young age to be physically strong and confident. Though she briefly tried basketball, she was drawn to wrestling after visiting an akhada in Jind and watching local dangals.

At age 12, she began formal training and soon joined a sports hostel, balancing academics with a rigorous training schedule. Life at the hostel was demanding; early mornings, rough tracks and sparring with older boys, but it shaped her into a tough and determined wrestler. Later she began winning at school and junior national levels, laying the groundwork for her future in elite wrestling.

== Career ==
- 2021: The year marked as a major turning point in Dahiya's wrestling career. She made her mark internationally by clinching the silver medal at the U23 World Championships, in the 65 kg category. Her performances in domestic tournaments also showed consistency, and she became a regular face in India's national camps.
- 2022: Dahiya had a strong showing at the World Championships, reaching the semifinals. In the bronze medal match against Linda Morais, Nisha was leading 4–0 before suffering a relapse of a previous ACL injury, which caused her to collapse mid-bout. Unable to continue, she lost by fall and finished fourth. The injury, which had troubled her earlier in the year, was later treated back in India. Despite the setback, her performance solidified her reputation at the global level.
- 2023: Nisha repeated her silver medal performance at the Asian Championships and excelled in UWW Ranking Series events. Her biggest achievement was securing an Olympic quota for India at the World Olympic Qualifiers at Istanbul in May, confirming her spot for 2024 Paris Olympics. She defeated Romania's Alexandra Anghel in the 68 kg semi-finals to book her Olympic berth.
- 2024: 2024 was the most anticipated year of Dahiya's career as she represented India at the Paris Olympics in the women's 68 kg freestyle category. She started strongly, winning her opening bout and entering the quarterfinals, where she was leading 8–1 in a dominating performance. However, during that crucial quarterfinal, she suffered a dislocated finger and a shoulder injury mid-bout, which severely limited her ability to continue. Despite her valiant effort, she lost the match due to injury and narrowly missed the medal round. She finished seventh overall.

== Controversy ==
In 2021, Dahiya was briefly at the center of a media controversy when several news outlets falsely reported her death, confusing her with another wrestler of the same name who was shot in Haryana. She later released a video statement confirming she was alive and competing at the Senior National Championships in Uttar Pradesh.
