= Arif Özen =

Turkish freestyle wrestler

Personal information
- Full name: Arif Özen
- Born: 1 January 1998 (age 28) Denizli, Turkey
- Education: Mehmet Akif Ersoy University
- Height: 1.80 m (5 ft 11 in)
- Weight: 86 kg (190 lb; 13.5 st)

Sport
- Country: Turkey
- Sport: Amateur wrestling
- Event: Freestyle
- Club: Sancaktepe Belediye S.K.
Medal record
Men's freestyle wrestling
Representing Turkey
World Military Championships
Bronze medal – third place	2023 Baku	92 kg
European U23 Championship
Silver medal – second place	2019 Novi Sad	86 kg
Silver medal – second place	2018 İstanbul	86 kg
World Juniors Championships
Gold medal – first place	2018 Trnava	86 kg
European Juniors Championships
Gold medal – first place	2018 Rome	86 kg

Arif Özen (born 1 January 1998) is a Turkish freestyle wrestler competing in the 86 kg division. He is a member of Sancaktepe Belediye S.K.

== Career ==
In 2018, he won the gold medal in the men's 86 kg event at the 2018 European Juniors Wrestling Championships held in Rome, Italy.

Arif Özen won the gold medal in the Greco-Roman style 86 kg at the 2018 World Junior Wrestling Championships in Trnava, Slovakia. Competing in the 86 kg category, Özen defeated Indian opponent Dupiak Punia by a 2–1 score.

In 2019, he won the silver medal in the men's 86 kg event at the 2019 European U23 Wrestling Championship held in Novi Sad, Serbia.
