= Aynur Erge =

Turkish freestyle wrestler

Personal information
- Born: January 1, 1998 (age 28) Ordu, Turkey
- Height: 1.60 m (5 ft 3 in)
- Weight: 50 kg (110 lb; 7.9 st)

Sport
- Country: Turkey
- Sport: Women's freestyle wrestling
- Event: Freestyle
- Club: Enka SK
Medal record
Men's freestyle wrestling
Representing Turkey
Yasar Dogu Tournament
Bronze medal – third place	2020 Istanbul	50 kg
Bronze medal – third place	2025 Kocaeli	50 kg
Grand Prix
Silver medal – second place	2021 Bucharest	50 kg
Bronze medal – third place	2017 Bucharest	50 kg
European U23 Championship
Bronze medal – third place	2021 Skopje	50 kg
European Juniors Championships
Silver medal – second place	2018 Rome	50 kg

Aynur Erge (born January 1, 1998) is a Turkish freestyle wrestler competing in the 50 kg division. She is a member of Enkaspor.

== Career ==
In 2018, she won the silver medal in the women's 50 kg event at the 2018 European Juniors Wrestling Championships held in Rome, Italy.

In 2021, she won the bronze medal in the women's 50 kg event at the 2021 European U23 Wrestling Championship held in Skopje, North Macedonia.
