= Oktay Güngör =

Turkish freestyle wrestler

Personal information
- Born: 25 January 1998 (age 28) Balıkesir
- Education: Ardahan University

Sport
- Country: Turkey
- Sport: Amateur wrestling
- Weight class: 125 kg
- Event: Freestyle
- Club: Istanbul BB SK
Medal record
Men's freestyle wrestling
Representing Turkey
Yasar Dogu Tournament
Bronze medal – third place	2021 Istanbul	125 kg
European Juniors Championships
Bronze medal – third place	2018 Rome	125 kg

Oktay Güngör (born 25 January 1998) is a Turkish freestyle wrestler competing in the 125 kg division. He is a member of Istanbul BB SK.

== Career ==
In 2018, he won bronze medal in the men's 125 kg event at the 2018 European Juniors Wrestling Championships held in Rome, Italy.
