= 2024 European Wrestling Championships – Women's freestyle 65 kg =

Wrestling competition

Women's freestyle 65 kg at the 2024 European Wrestling Championships
- Venue: Polyvalent Hall
- Location: Bucharest, Romania
- Dates: 15-16 February
- Competitors: 11

Medalists
gold medal	Iryna Koliadenko	Ukraine
silver medal	Kateryna Zelenykh	Romania
bronze medal	Irina Rîngaci	Moldova
bronze medal	Elis Manolova	Azerbaijan

The women's freestyle 65 kg is a competition featured at the 2024 European Wrestling Championships, and held in Bucharest, Romania on February 15 and 16.

== Results ==
Legend

- F — Won by fall

=== Main bracket ===
Round of 16
Kateryna Zelenykh (ROU)	10
Taybe Yusein (BUL)	0
Elma Zeidlere (LAT)	0
Iryna Koliadenko (UKR)	4^{F}
Nikoleta Barmpa (GRE)	0
Elis Manolova (AZE)	5

Quarterfinals
Kadriye Aksoy (TUR)	5
Kateryna Zelenykh (ROU)	9
Dinara Kudaeva (AIN)	0
Irina Rîngaci (MDA)	10
Anne Nürnberger (GER)	0
Iryna Koliadenko (UKR)	10^{F}
Elis Manolova (AZE)	4
Tatsiana Paulava (AIN)	1

Semifinals
Kateryna Zelenykh (ROU)	7^{F}
Irina Rîngaci (MDA)	2
Iryna Koliadenko (UKR)	11
Elis Manolova (AZE)	0

Final
Kateryna Zelenykh (ROU)	0
Iryna Koliadenko (UKR)	6

=== Repechage ===
Repechage round 1
Taybe Yusein (BUL)	2
Kadriye Aksoy (TUR)	7^{F}
Elma Zeidlere (LAT)	2
Anne Nürnberger (GER)	3

Bronze medal match
Kadriye Aksoy (TUR)	4
Irina Rîngaci (MDA)	10
Anne Nürnberger (GER)	1
Elis Manolova (AZE)	2

== Final standing ==
Rank	Athlete
1st place, gold medalist(s)	Iryna Koliadenko (UKR)
2nd place, silver medalist(s)	Kateryna Zelenykh (ROU)
3rd place, bronze medalist(s)	Irina Rîngaci (MDA)
3rd place, bronze medalist(s)	Elis Manolova (AZE)
5	Kadriye Aksoy (TUR)
5	Anne Nürnberger (GER)
7	Elma Zeidlere (LAT)
8	Tatsiana Paulava (AIN)
9	Taybe Yusein (BUL)
10	Nikoleta Barmpa (GRE)
11	Dinara Kudaeva (AIN)
