= 2018 World Wrestling Championships – Women's freestyle 65 kg =

Women's freestyle 65 kg at the 2018 World Championships
- Venue: László Papp Budapest Sports Arena
- Dates: 23–24 October 2018
- Competitors: 22 from 22 nations

Medalists
gold medal	Petra Olli	Finland
silver medal	Danielle Lappage	Canada
bronze medal	Ayana Gempei	Japan
bronze medal	Irina Netreba	Azerbaijan

The women's freestyle 65 kilograms is a competition featured at the 2018 World Wrestling Championships, and was held in Budapest, Hungary on 23 and 24 October.

This freestyle wrestling competition consists of a single-elimination tournament, with a repechage used to determine the winner of two bronze medals. The two finalists face off for gold and silver medals. Each wrestler who loses to one of the two finalists moves into the repechage, culminating in a pair of bronze medal matches featuring the semifinal losers each facing the remaining repechage opponent from their half of the bracket.

== Results ==
Legend

- F — Won by fall

=== Final ===
Final
Petra Olli (FIN)	6
Danielle Lappage (CAN)	5

=== Top half ===
Round of 32

Round of 16
Petra Olli (FIN)	4
Sofiya Georgieva (BUL)	4
Ilona Prokopevniuk (UKR)	4
Ritu Malik (IND)	5
Ayana Gempei (JPN)	8
Gabriella Sleisz (HUN)	0
Nguyễn Thị Vinh (VIE)	0
Adéla Hanzlíčková (CZE)	2^{F}

Quarterfinals
Petra Olli (FIN)	6
Ritu Malik (IND)	2
Ayana Gempei (JPN)	6
Adéla Hanzlíčková (CZE)	1

Semifinals
Petra Olli (FIN)	6
Ayana Gempei (JPN)	6

=== Bottom half ===
Round of 32
Irina Netreba (AZE)	6
Yanet Sovero (PER)	2
Laura Skujiņa (LAT)	7
Tayla Ford (NZL)	2
Tang Chuying (CHN)	6^{F}
Aslı Demir (TUR)	1
Maria Kuznetsova (RUS)	1
Danielle Lappage (CAN)	14
Khürelkhüügiin Bolortuyaa (MGL)	6^{F}
Lee Han-bit (KOR)	2
Leidy Izquierdo (COL)	4
Krystsina Fedarashka (BLR)	1

Round of 16
Henna Johansson (SWE)	1
Irina Netreba (AZE)	3
Laura Skujiņa (LAT)	8
Tang Chuying (CHN)	11
Danielle Lappage (CAN)	10
Khürelkhüügiin Bolortuyaa (MGL)	0
Leidy Izquierdo (COL)	0
Forrest Molinari (USA)	4

Quarterfinals
Irina Netreba (AZE)	3
Tang Chuying (CHN)	0
Danielle Lappage (CAN)	6
Forrest Molinari (USA)	2

Semifinals
Irina Netreba (AZE)	0
Danielle Lappage (CAN)	11

=== Repechage ===
Repechage round 1
Maria Kuznetsova (RUS)	13
Khürelkhüügiin Bolortuyaa (MGL)	2

Repechage round 2
Sofiya Georgieva (BUL)	8
Ritu Malik (IND)	9
Maria Kuznetsova (RUS)	8
Forrest Molinari (USA)	8^{F}

Bronze medals
Ritu Malik (IND)	3
Ayana Gempei (JPN)	7
Forrest Molinari (USA)	1
Irina Netreba (AZE)	1
