= Linnea Svensson =

Swedish footballer

Personal information
- Full name: Linnea Johanna Svensson
- Date of birth: 3 February 1999 (age 27)
- Place of birth: Malmö, Sweden
- Height: 1.72 m (5 ft 8 in)
- Position: Defender

Team information
- Current team: Malmö FF
- Number: 4

Youth career
- 2014-2016: FC Rosengård

Senior career*
Years	Team	Apps	(Gls)
2016–2018	FC Rosengård	4	(0)
2019	KIF Örebro	5	(0)
2019–2020	→ Brøndby IF (loan)	9	(0)
2020	Brøndby IF		
2020–2021	IFK Kalmar	37	(0)
2022–	Malmö FF		

International career^{‡}
2015–2016	Sweden U17	17	(0)
2017–2018	Sweden U19	19	(1)
- * Club domestic league appearances and goals as of 13 March 2023 ‡ National team caps and goals as of 13 March 2023

Linnea Johanna Svensson (born 3 February 1999) is a Swedish footballer who plays as a defender for Malmö FF in the Swedish Division 1. She has also played for the Swedish youth national teams, several times.

== Honours ==
=== Club ===
Rosengård

- Damallsvenskan
  - Winner: 2015
  - Runner-up: 2016, 2017
- Svenska Cupen
  - Winner: 2015/16, 2016/17, 2017/18
  - Runner-up: 2014/15
- Svenska Supercupen
  - Winner: 2015, 2016

Brøndby

- Danish Women's League
  - Runner-up: 2019/20

Kalmar

- Elitettan
  - Runner-up: 2021

Malmö

- Division 2 Södra Götaland
  - Winner: 2022
