= Alina Kasabieva =

Russian freestyle wrestler (born 2002)

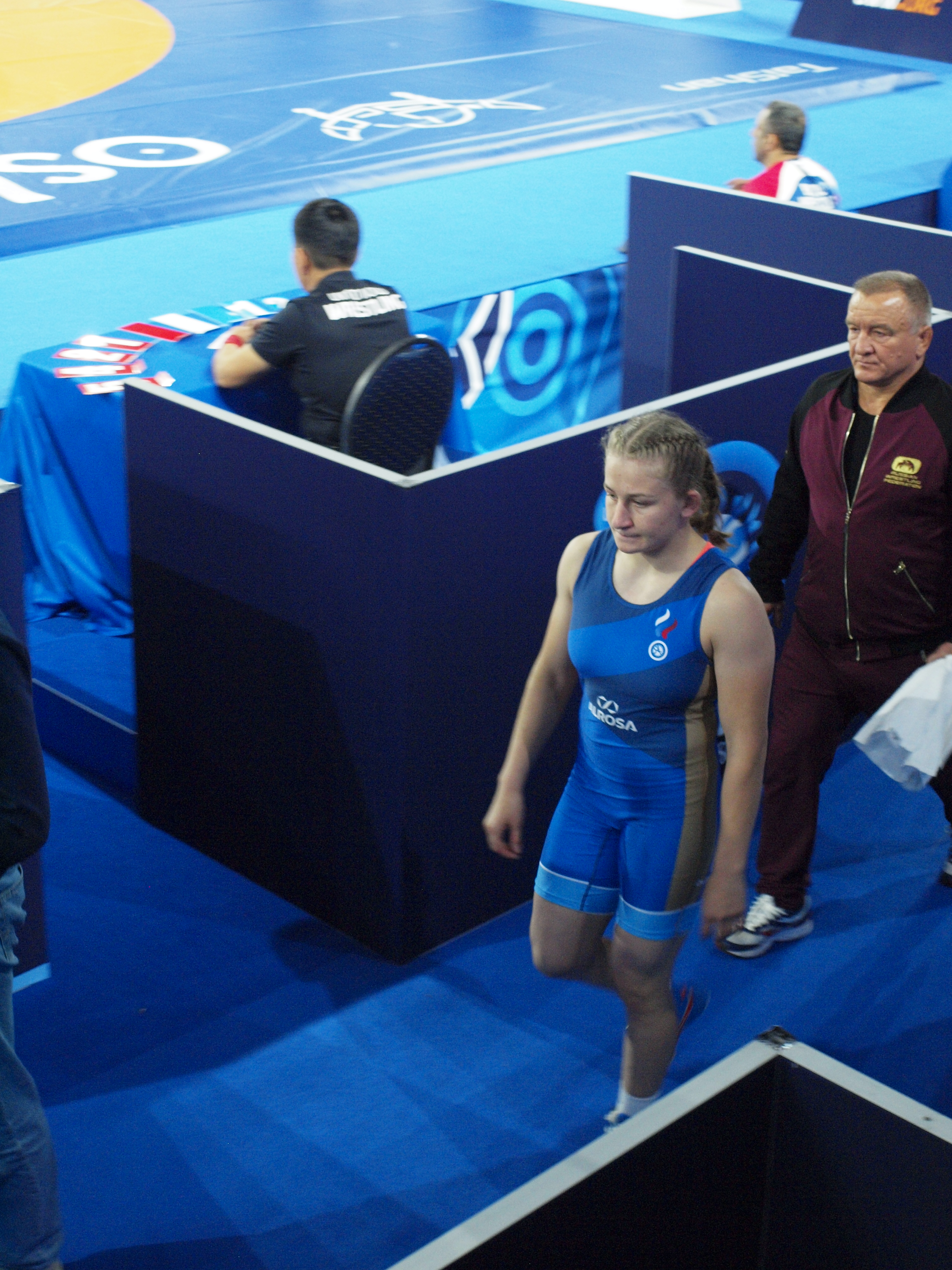
- Kasabieva at the 2021 World Championships in Oslo, Norway

Personal information
- Native name: Алина Романовна Касабиева
- Full name: Alina Romanovna Kasabieva
- National team: Russia
- Born: 6 March 2002 (age 24) South Ossetia, Georgia
- Height: 1.60 m (5 ft 3 in)
- Weight: 62 kg (137 lb; 9.8 st)

Sport
- Country: Russia
- Sport: Women's freestyle wrestling
- Event: 62 kg
- Club: Crimea-SPORT WC; Soslan Andiyev's WC
- Coached by: Oleg Kudukhov, Ignat Grek
Medal record
Women's freestyle wrestling
Representing United World Wrestling
World Championships
Silver medal – second place	2025 Zagreb	65 kg
Grand Prix
Silver medal – second place	2025 Budapest	62 kg
Representing Individual Neutral Athletes
U23 World Championships
Silver medal – second place	2024 Tirana	65 kg
U23 European Championships
Bronze medal – third place	2024 Baku	62 kg
Representing Russia
Junior World Championships
Gold medal – first place	2021 Ufa	62 kg
Junior European Championships
Gold medal – first place	2021 Dortmund	62 kg
Golden Grand Prix Ivan Yarygin
Bronze medal – third place	2022 Krasnoyarsk	62 kg

Alina Romanovna Kasabieva (Russian: Алина Романовна Касабиева; born 6 March 2002 in South Ossetia) is a Russian freestyle wrestler of Ossetian descent, 2025 senior world runner-up, 2021 U20 European and world champion. 2x Senior national champion.

== Background ==
She was born in South Ossetia, Georgia, into an Ossetian family, then she moved to Vladikavkaz, North Ossetia–Alania, Russia, where she started wrestling at the age of 10.

== Career ==
Her first achievement was at the 2019 Cadet world championships in Sofia, Bulgaria, where she took a bronze medal. In 2021, as a junior wrestler, she became Russian, European and world champion at 62 kilos. Also, Alina made her debut in senior level at the 2021 world championships, where she came 7th. In 2022, Kasabieva competed at the Ivan Yarygin Grand Prix and took one of the bronze medals and became senior national champion. During the 2023 part of the season, Kasabieva won Russian nationals again. In the post-season she beat Elis Manolova of Bulgaria, senior world champion Anastasia Nichita of Moldova and Olympic silver medalist Aisuluu Tynybekova of Kyrgyzstan at the Ivan Poddubny wrestling league. In April 2024, she earned a quota place for the 2024 Summer Olympics held in Paris, France as an independent neutral athlete. In May 2024, she came third at the U23 European Championships in Baku, Azerbaijan.

== Honors ==
- 2018 Cadet Russian Championships — 3rd.
- 2019 Cadet World Championships — 3rd.
- 2021, 2022 Junior Russian Championships — 1st.
- 2021 Junior European Championships — 1st.
- 2021 Junior World Championships — 1st.
- 2022 Ivan Yarygin GP — 3rd.
- 2022, 2023 Russian nationals — 1st.
- 2023 Ivan Poddubny wrestling league 1,2,3,4 — 1st.
- 2023 Grand Prix Zagreb Open — 3rd.
- 2024 U23 European Championship — 3rd.
- 2025 World Championships — 2nd.
