= Derya Bayhan =

Turkish freestyle wrestler (born 1996)

Personal information
- Nationality: Turkish
- Born: 1 November 1996 (age 30)
- Height: 170 cm (5 ft 7 in)

Sport
- Country: Turkey
- Sport: Wrestling
- Event: Freestyle wrestling
- Club: Yalova Altınova Tersaneler
Medal record
Women's freestyle wrestling
Representing Turkey
Islamic Solidarity Games
Bronze medal – third place	2017 Baku	58 kg
World University Championships
Bronze medal – third place	2016 Çorum	58 kg

Derya Bayhan (born 1 November 1996) is a Turkish freestyle wrestler. She won the bronze medal in the women's 58 kg event at the 2016 European U23 Wrestling Championships in Ruse, the bronze medal in the women's 60 kg event at the 2016 World University Wrestling Championships in Çorum, and the bronze medal in the women's 58 kg event at the 2017 Islamic Solidarity Games in Baku.
