= Macey Kilty =

American wrestler (born 2001)

Personal information
- Born: March 13, 2001 (age 25) Stratford, Wisconsin, U.S.
- Height: 1.62 m (5 ft 4 in)

Sport
- Country: United States
- Sport: Wrestling
- Weight class: 143 lb (65 kg)
- Event: Freestyle
- College team: University of Iowa
- Club: Iowa Women's Wrestling Club
- Coached by: Tonya Verbeek, Clarissa Chun, Gary Mayabb
Medal record
Women's freestyle wrestling
Representing United States
World Championships
Silver medal – second place	2023 Belgrade	65 kg
Bronze medal – third place	2024 Tirana	65 kg
Pan American Championships
Gold medal – first place	2024 Acapulco	65 kg
Gold medal – first place	2025 Monterrey	65 kg
World Cup
Silver medal – second place	2019 Narita	Team
Yasar Dogu Tournament
Silver medal – second place	2022 Istanbul	62 kg
Golden Grand Prix Ivan Yarygin
Silver medal – second place	2022 Krasnoyarsk	62 kg
Grand Prix
Gold medal – first place	2026 Tirana	62 kg
Bronze medal – third place	2025 Budapest	65 kg
Bronze medal – third place	2026 Zagreb	62 kg
World U23 Championships
Silver medal – second place	2024 Tirana	62 kg
World Junior Championships
Silver medal – second place	2018 Trnava	68 kg
Silver medal – second place	2019 Tallinn	65 kg

Macey Ellen Kilty (born March 13, 2001) is an American freestyle wrestler. Kilty was runner up at 2020 United States Olympic Trials . Kilty was second at the 2019 Wrestling World Cup - Women's freestyle for Team USA. Kilty was second at the Golden Grand Prix Ivan Yarygin 2022. Kilty was Second at the U-23 World Cup in 2019 and 2018. She was the 2018 Cadet World Champion after winning a silver medal in 2017 and a bronze medal in 2016.

Kilty won the gold medal in her event at the 2024 Pan American Wrestling Championships held in Acapulco, Mexico.

She is the training partner of Olympic champion and multiple-time world champion Amit Elor.

Kilty was a finalist for the 2025 Anthony-Maroulis Trophy.

== Achievements ==
Year	Tournament	Location	Result	Event
2023	World Championships	Belgrade, Serbia	2nd	Freestyle 65 kg
2024	Pan American Wrestling Championships	Acapulco, Mexico	1st	Freestyle 65 kg
2024	World Championships	Tirana, Albania	3rd	Freestyle 65 kg
2025	Pan American Wrestling Championships	Monterrey, Mexico	1st	Freestyle 65 kg
