= Adil-Yangiyurt =

Adil-Yangiyurt Адиль-Янгиюрт Адил-янгы-юрт
- Selo
- Location within Republic of Dagestan Location within Russia
- Coordinates: 43°33′N 46°35′E
- Country: Russia
- Region: Republic of Dagestan
- District: Babayurtovsky District
- Time zone: UTC+3:00

Adil-Yangiyurt (Russian: Адиль-Янгиюрт; Kumyk: Адил-янгы-юрт, romanized: Adil-yañı-yurt) is a rural locality (a selo) and the administrative centre of Adil-Yangiyurtovsky Selsoviet, Babayurtovsky District, Republic of Dagestan, Russia. The population was 3,864 as of 2010. There are 39 streets. Selo was founded in 1857.

== Geography ==
Adil-Yangiyurt is located 16 km southwest of Babayurt (the district's administrative centre) by road. Chankayurt is the nearest rural locality.
