= Aslı Demir =

Turkish freestyle wrestler (born 1999)

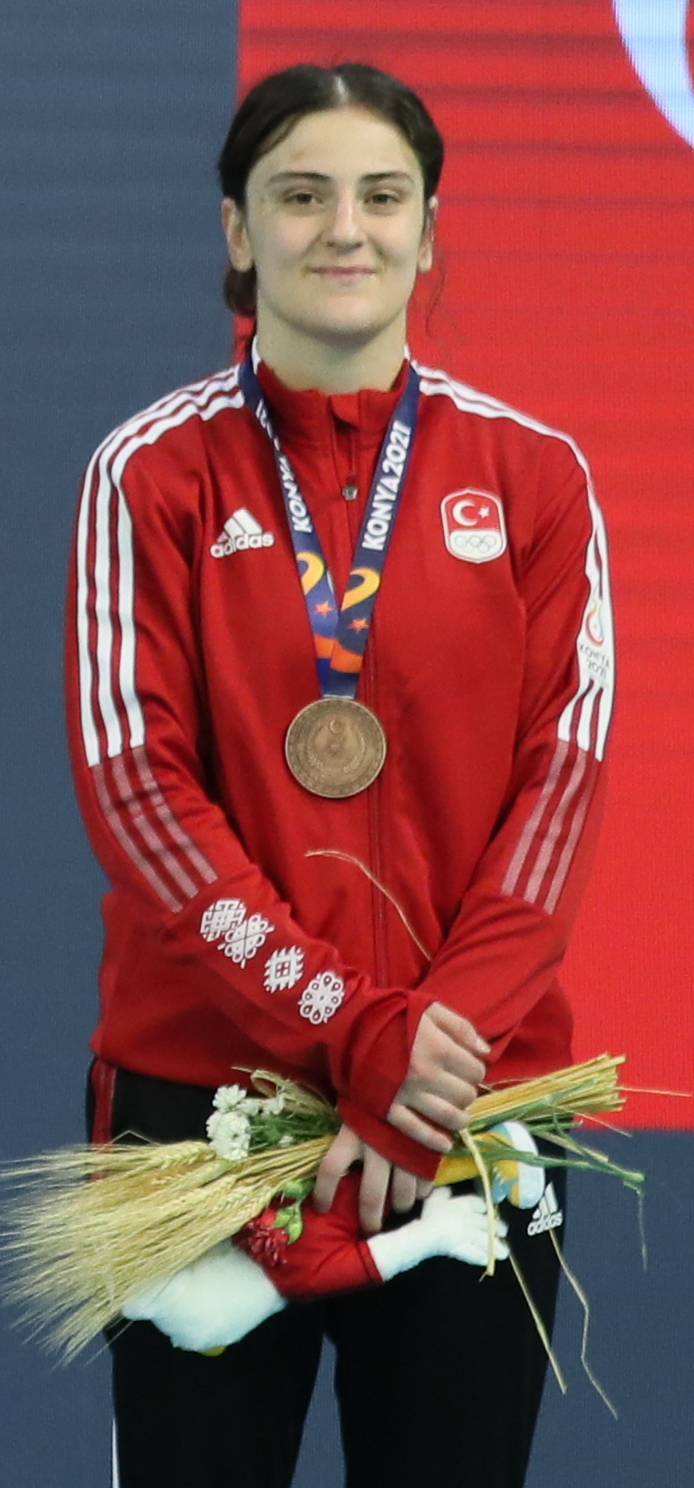
- Demir in 2022

Personal information
- Nationality: Turkish
- Born: 1 September 1999 (age 26) Konya, Turkey
- Home town: Konya, Turkey
- Height: 1.71 m (5 ft 7 1/2 in)
- Weight: 68 kg (150 lb)

Sport
- Country: Turkey
- Sport: Women's freestyle wrestling
- Event: 68 kg
Medal record
Women's freestyle wrestling
Representing Turkey
Islamic Solidarity Games
Bronze medal – third place	2021 Konya	68 kg
Yasar Dogu Tournament
Silver medal – second place	2026 Antalya	65 kg
Bronze medal – third place	2025 Kocaeli	65 kg
U23 World Championships
Bronze medal – third place	2021 Belgrade	65 kg
European U23 Championships
Silver medal – second place	2022 Plovdiv	68 kg
European Juniors Championships
Bronze medal – third place	2018 Rome	65 kg

Aslı Demir (born 1 September 1999) is a Turkish freestyle wrestler competing in the 68 kg division.

== Career ==
=== 2018 ===
Demir took the bronze medal in the 65 kg event at the 2018 European Juniors Wrestling Championships held in Rome, Italy defeating Hungarian Noémi Szabados by 5–3. She debuted in the seniors category at the 2018 World Wrestling Championships in Budapest, Hungary. She was eliminated in the Round of 32 in the 65 kg event to Chinese Tang Chuying by 1–6.

=== 2020 ===
She received the bronze medal in the 65 kg event of the U23 category at the 2020 Individual Wrestling World Cup in Belgrade, Serbia.

=== 2021 ===
She lost the quarter-finals match to Bulgarian Mimi Hristova by 2–7 in the 65 kg event of the 2021 World Wrestling Championships in Oslo, Norway, and placed eight. At the 2021 U23 World Wrestling Championships in Belgrade, Serbia, she became bronze medalist in the 65 kg event defeating Italian Elena Esposito by 3–2 in the repechage match.

=== 2022 ===
At the 2022 European U23 Wrestling Championships in Plovdiv, Bulgaria, she won the silver medal in the 68 kg event after losing to Irina Rîngaci from Moldova in the final.

At the 2022 European Wrestling Championships in Budapest, Hungary, she lost the quarter-finals match in the 68 kg event to Natalia Strzałka from Poland by 6–13. She took the bronze medal defeating Oguljan Egemberdiyeva from Turkmenistan by 10–0 in the 68 kg event at the 2021 Islamic Solidarity Games in Konya, Turkey.

== Personal life ==
Aslı Demir was born in Konya, Turkey on 1 September 1999.
