= Johanna Mattsson =

Swedish freestyle wrestler

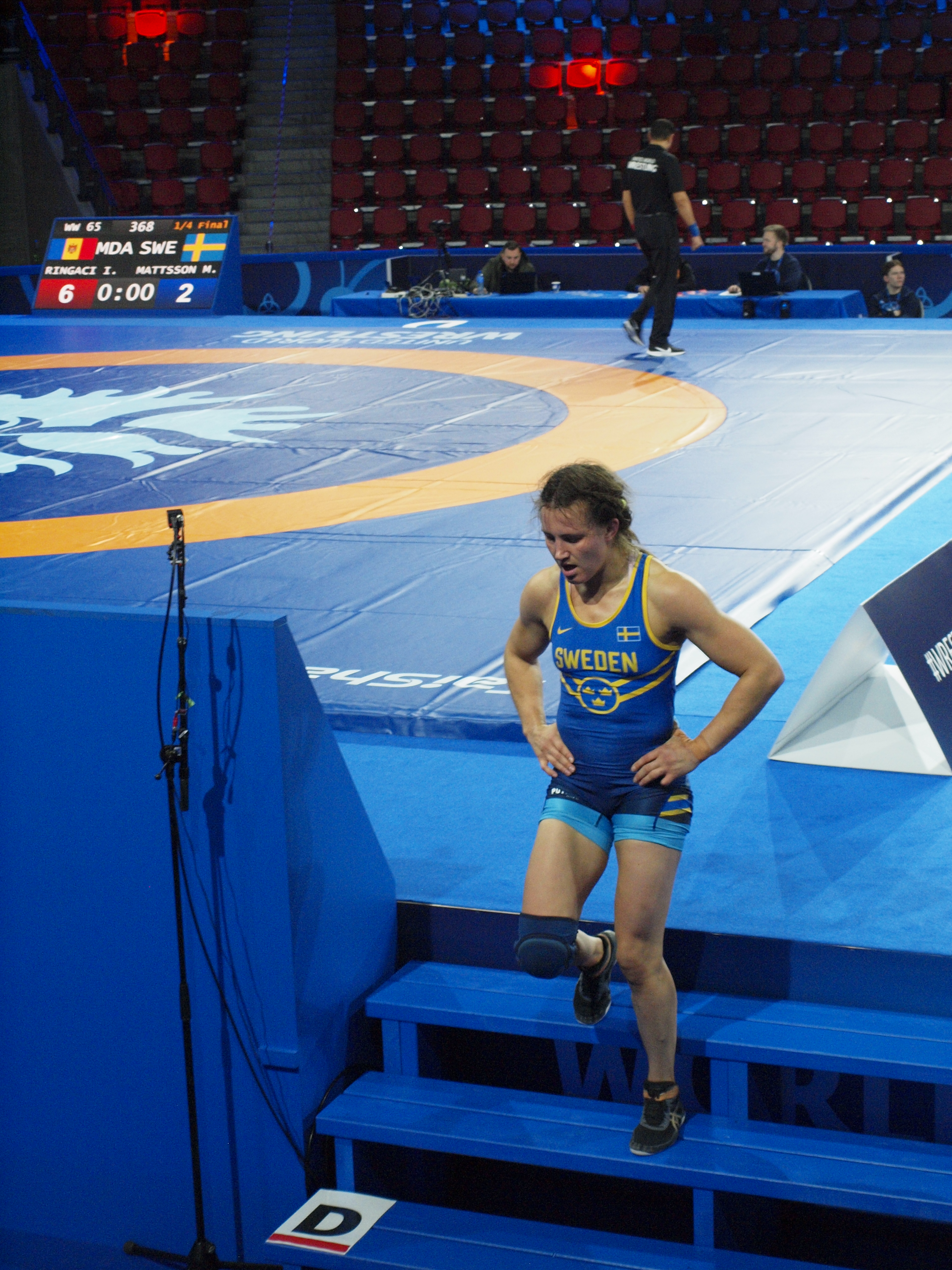

Personal information
- Born: 2 May 1988 (age 38) Gällivare, Sweden
Medal record
Women's freestyle wrestling
Representing Sweden
World Championships
Bronze medal – third place	2010 Moscow	59 kg
Bronze medal – third place	2017 Paris	60 kg
Bronze medal – third place	2021 Oslo	65 kg
European Championships
Gold medal – first place	2009 Vilnius	59 kg
Gold medal – first place	2014 Vantaa	60 kg
Bronze medal – third place	2006 Moscow	55 kg
Bronze medal – third place	2017 Novi Sad	60 kg

Johanna Mattsson (born 2 May 1988 in Gällivare) is a freestyle wrestler from Sweden. She is a three-time bronze medalist at the World Wrestling Championships (2010, 2017, 2021). She is also a two-time gold medalist at the European Wrestling Championships (2009 and 2014).

== Career ==
At the European Wrestling Championships she won gold in 2009 and 2014 and bronze in 2006 and 2017.

She won one of the bronze medals in the women's 65 kg event at the 2021 World Wrestling Championships held in Oslo, Norway.
