= Kateryna Zelenykh =

Ukrainian freestyle wrestler

Personal information
- Native name: Катерина Дмитрівна Зелених
- Full name: Kateryna Dmitrievna Zelenykh
- Born: January 31, 2001 (age 25) Artemovsk, Donetsk Oblast, Ukraine
- Height: 1.70 m (5 ft 7 in)
- Weight: 68 kg (150 lb; 10.7 st)

Sport
- Country: Ukraine (2019–2022); Romania (2024–present)
- Sport: Amateur wrestling
- Weight class: 68 kg
- Event: Women's freestyle
- Club: Steaua Bucharest
Medal record
Women's freestyle wrestling
Representing Romania
World Championships
Silver medal – second place	2024 Tirana	65 kg
European Championships
Silver medal – second place	2024 Bucharest	65 kg
Silver medal – second place	2025 Bratislava	68 kg
Dan Kolov & Nikola Petrov Tournament
Gold medal – first place	2024 Sofia	65 kg
World U23 Championships
Bronze medal – third place	2024 Tirana	65 kg
European U23 Championships
Bronze medal – third place	2024 Baku	65 kg
Representing Ukraine
World Cup
Gold medal – first place	2022 Coralville	Team
Individual World Cup
Bronze medal – third place	2020 Belgrade	59 kg
World U23 Championships
Silver medal – second place	2021 Belgrade	62 kg
Bronze medal – third place	2022 Pontevedra	65 kg
European U23 Championships
Silver medal – second place	2021 Skopje	65 kg
World Juniors Championships
Bronze medal – third place	2019 Tallinn	59 kg
European Juniors Championships
Silver medal – second place	2021 Dortmund	62 kg
Bronze medal – third place	2019 Pontevedra	62 kg

Kateryna Zelenykh is a Ukrainian-born Romanian freestyle wrestler. She won the silver medal in the 65 kg event at the 2024 European Wrestling Championships held in Bucharest, Romania. She also won the silver medal in the 68 kg event in 2025.

== Career ==
She won one of the bronze medals in the women's 59 kg event at the 2020 Individual Wrestling World Cup held in Belgrade, Serbia.

At the 2021 U23 World Wrestling Championships held in Belgrade, Serbia, she won the silver medal in the 62 kg event. She won one of the bronze medals in the 65 kg event at the 2022 U23 World Wrestling Championships held in Pontevedra, Spain. She won the silver medal in the 65 kg event at the 2024 European Wrestling Championships held in Bucharest, Romania.

== Achievements ==
Year	Tournament	Location	Result	Event
2024	European Championships	Bucharest, Romania	2nd	Freestyle 65 kg
2024	World Championships	Tirana, Albania	2nd	Freestyle 65 kg
2025	European Championships	Bratislava, Slovakia	2nd	Freestyle 68 kg
