= Kadriye Aksoy Koçak =

Turkish wrestler (born 1999)

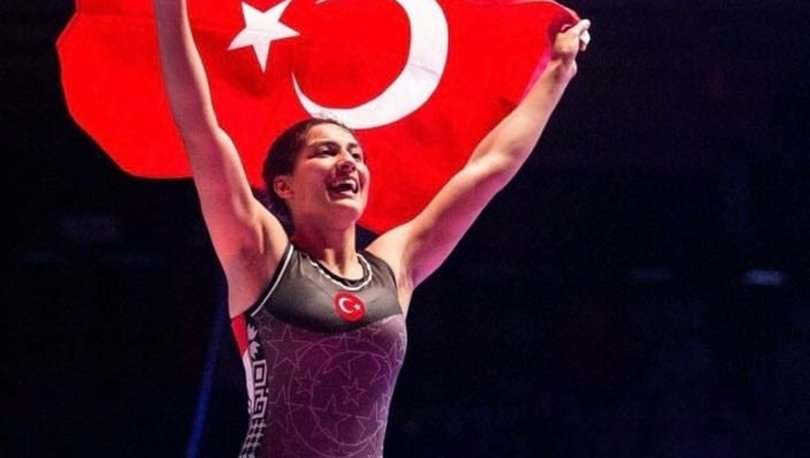
- Aksoy in 2022

Personal information
- Nationality: Turkish
- Born: 27 April 1999 (age 27) Isparta, Turkey
- Height: 1.73 m (5 ft 8 in)

Sport
- Country: Turkey
- Sport: Women's freestyle wrestling
- Event: 65 kg
- Club: Balıkesir BB SK
Medal record
Women's freestyle wrestling
Representing Turkey
Mediterranean Games
Silver medal – second place	2026 Taranto	76 kg
Yasar Dogu Tournament
Gold medal – first place	2023 Istanbul	65 kg
Grand Prix
Silver medal – second place	2023 Budapest	65 kg
European Juniors Championships
Silver medal – second place	2019 Pontevedra	68 kg
Bronze medal – third place	2018 Rome	68 kg

Kadriye Aksoy Koçak (née Aksoy; born April 27, 1999) is a Turkish freestyle wrestler competing in the 65 kg division.

== Sports career ==
Aksoy started sport wrestling in 2013 during her time at Atabey İslamköy Hacı Yahya Demirel boarding middle school. She was coached by Esra Ak. She was seven times Turkish champion, twice runner-up and twice third place holder. She debuted internationally at 2015 Balkan Wrestling Championship held in Bursa, Turkey, and won the gold medal in the 60 kg. In 2016 at the Balkan Championship in Craiova, Romania, she took the silver medal in the 63 kg. The same year, she became gold medalist in the 63 kg at the World School Sport Games (2016 Gymnasiade) in Trabzon, Turkey. She won the gold medal in the 67 kg at the 2017 Balkan Championship in Bursa, Turkey. In the 68 kg of the European Wrestling Championships, she took the bronze medal 2018 in Rome, Italy, and the silver medal in the 2019 in Pontevedra, Spain. She competed in the 65 kg at the 2019 World Wrestling Championships in Nur-Sultan, Kazakhstan, and in the 58 kg at the 2020 European Wrestling Championships without reaching to any medal. The 2020 Yasar Dogu Tournament, she finished without success. She became champion in the freestyle 65 kg at the 2022 FISU University World Cup Combat Sports in Samsun, Turkey. She received the silver medal in the 65 kg at the 2023 Polyák Imre & Varga János Memorial Tournament in Budapest, Hungary. She captured the gold medal in the 65 kg at the 2023 Yasar Dogu Tournament in Istanbul, Turkey. She lost her bronze medal match in the 65 kg event at the 2024 European Wrestling Championships held in Bucharest, Romania. She competed at the 2024 European Wrestling Olympic Qualification Tournament in Baku, Azerbaijan hoping to qualify for the 2024 Summer Olympics in Paris, France. She was eliminated in her first match and she did not qualify for the Olympics.

In 2021, she transferred from Women Wrestling Team of Istanbul Enka SK, which was formed in 2017, to Balıkesir BB SK (Balıkesir Metropolitan Municipality Sport Club). She is 1.73 m (5 ft 8 in) tall.

== Personal life ==
Kadriye Aksoy was born to Tevfik Aksoy and his wife Pembe in Şarkikaraağaç district of Isparta Province on 27 April 1999. Her sister Cansu Aksoy is also a sport wrestler. She is a student of Sport Science at Süleyman Demirel University in her hometown.
