= Tetiana Rizhko =

Ukrainian freestyle wrestler

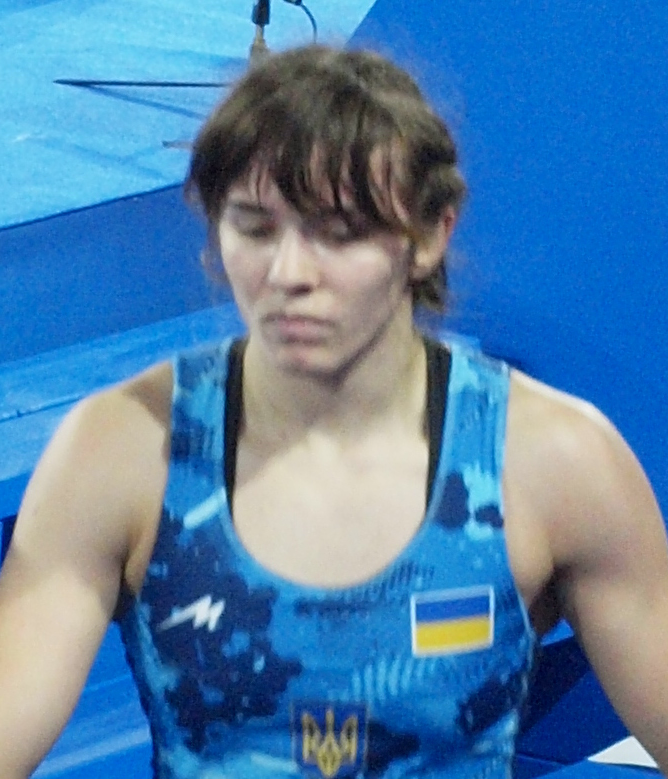
- Rizhko at the 2021 World Wrestling Championships in Oslo, Norway

Personal information
- Native name: Тетяна Сова Ріжко
- Full name: Tetiana Sova Rizhko
- Born: 14 February 1998 (age 28)
- Height: 170 cm (5 ft 7 in)

Sport
- Country: Ukraine
- Sport: Amateur wrestling
- Weight class: 65 kg; 68 kg
- Event: Freestyle
Medal record
Women's freestyle wrestling
Representing Ukraine
European Championships
| Gold medal – first place | 2022 Budapest | 65 kg |
| Silver medal – second place | 2021 Warsaw | 65 kg |
| Silver medal – second place | 2024 Bucharest | 68 kg |
| Bronze medal – third place | 2023 Zagreb | 65 kg |
Individual World Cup
| Gold medal – first place | 2020 Belgrade | 65 kg |
European U23 Championships
| Gold medal – first place | 2021 Skopje | 62 kg |

Tetyana Sova (Ukrainian: Тетяна Сова, born 14 February 1998), née Rizhko (Ріжко), is a Ukrainian freestyle wrestler. She is a four-time medalist, including gold, at the European Wrestling Championships. She won the gold medal in her event at the 2020 Individual Wrestling World Cup held in Belgrade, Serbia. Rizhko represented Ukraine at the 2024 Summer Olympics in Paris, France.

== Career ==
Rizhko competed in the women's freestyle event of the 2019 Wrestling World Cup.

In 2020, Rizhko won the gold medal in the women's 65 kg event at the Individual Wrestling World Cup held in Belgrade, Serbia. In the final, she defeated Irina Rîngaci of Moldova.

In April 2021, Rizhko won the silver medal in the 65 kg event at the European Wrestling Championships held in Warsaw, Poland. She won the gold medal in her event at the 2021 European U23 Wrestling Championship held in Skopje, North Macedonia. In October 2021, Rizhko competed in the women's 65 kg event at the World Wrestling Championships held in Oslo, Norway where she was eliminated in her first match by Koumba Larroque of France.

In 2022, Rizhko won the gold medal in the 65 kg event at the European Wrestling Championships held in Budapest, Hungary. In the final, she defeated Elis Manolova of Azerbaijan. A few months later, she won the gold medal in her event at the Matteo Pellicone Ranking Series 2022 held in Rome, Italy. She competed in the 65 kg event at the 2022 World Wrestling Championships held in Belgrade, Serbia where she was eliminated in her second match.

Rizhko won the gold medal in her event at the 2023 Ibrahim Moustafa Tournament held in Alexandria, Egypt. She won one of the bronze medals in the 65 kg event at the 2023 European Wrestling Championships held in Zagreb, Croatia. She defeated Kendra Dacher of France in her bronze medal match. In September 2023, Rizhko competed in the women's 68 kg event at the 2023 World Wrestling Championships held in Belgrade, Serbia. She was eliminated in her second match by Meerim Zhumanazarova of Kyrgyzstan.

Rizhko won the silver medal in the 68 kg event at the 2024 European Wrestling Championships held in Bucharest, Romania. In the final, she lost against Buse Tosun Çavuşoğlu of Turkey. Rizhko competed at the 2024 European Wrestling Olympic Qualification Tournament in Baku, Azerbaijan and she earned a quota place for Ukraine for the 2024 Summer Olympics in Paris, France. She competed in the women's 68 kg event at the Olympics. She was eliminated in her first match by Nisha Dahiya of India.

== Achievements ==
| Year | Tournament | Location | Result | Event |
|---|---|---|---|---|
| 2021 | European Championships | Warsaw, Poland | 2nd | Freestyle 65 kg |
| 2022 | European Championships | Budapest, Hungary | 1st | Freestyle 65 kg |
| 2023 | European Championships | Zagreb, Croatia | 3rd | Freestyle 65 kg |
| 2024 | European Championships | Bucharest, Romania | 2nd | Freestyle 68 kg |
