= 2020 Individual Wrestling World Cup – Women's freestyle 65 kg =

The Women's freestyle 65 kg is a competition featured at the 2020 Individual Wrestling World Cup, and was held in Belgrade, Serbia on 15 and 16 December 2020.

== Medalists ==
Gold	Tetiana Rizhko; Ukraine
Silver	Irina Rîngaci; Moldova
Bronze	Mimi Hristova; Bulgaria
Bronze	Elis Manolova; Azerbaijan

== Results ==
Legend

- F — Won by fall

1/8 finals
Debora Lawnitzak (GER)	3
Aslı Demir (TUR)	4
Berthe Etane Ngolle (CMR)	5
Fatoumata Camara (GUI)	1

Quarterfinals
Mariia Kuznetsova (RUS)	4
Tetiana Rizhko (UKR)	8
Mimi Hristova (BUL)	11
Sakshi Malik (IND)	0
Elis Manolova (AZE)	0
Irina Rîngaci (MDA)	6^{F}
Aslı Demir (TUR)	5
Berthe Etane Ngolle (CMR)	2

Semifinals
Tetiana Rizhko (UKR)	13
Mimi Hristova (BUL)	8
Irina Rîngaci (MDA)	14
Aslı Demir (TUR)	4

Final
Tetiana Rizhko (UKR)	14
Irina Rîngaci (MDA)	4

Bronze medals
Mariia Kuznetsova (RUS)	6
Mimi Hristova (BUL)	6^{F}
Elis Manolova (AZE)	4
Aslı Demir (TUR)	0
