= 2022 European Wrestling Championships – Women's freestyle 65 kg =

Wrestling competition

Women's freestyle 65 kg at the 2022 European Wrestling Championships
- Venue: BOK Sports Hall
- Location: Budapest, Hungary
- Dates: 31 March - 1 April
- Competitors: 6

Medalists
gold medal	Tetiana Rizhko	Ukraine
silver medal	Elis Manolova	Azerbaijan
bronze medal	Kriszta Incze	Romania

The women's freestyle 65 kg was a competition featured at the 2022 European Wrestling Championships, and was held in Budapest, Hungary on March 31 and 1 April.

== Results ==
Legend

- F — Won by fall

Elimination groups

Group A

Pos	Athlete	Pld	W	L	CP	TP
1	Kriszta Incze (ROU)	2	2	0	7	6
2	Sofiya Georgieva (BUL)	2	1	1	5	13
3	Aslı Tuğcu (TUR)	2	0	2	2	1

Source: UWW

	Score		CP
Kriszta Incze (ROU)	4–2	Aslı Tuğcu (TUR)	3–1 PO1
Sofiya Georgieva (BUL)	2–3	Kriszta Incze (ROU)	1–3 PO1
Aslı Tuğcu (TUR)	0–11	Sofiya Georgieva (BUL)	0–4 SU

Group B

Pos	Athlete	Pld	W	L	CP	TP
1	Tetiana Rizhko (UKR)	2	2	0	8	13
2	Elis Manolova (AZE)	2	1	1	3	6
3	Viktoria Vesso (EST)	2	0	2	1	3

Source: UWW

	Score		CP
Elis Manolova (AZE)	0–7	Tetiana Rizhko (UKR)	0–3 PO
Viktoria Vesso (EST)	3–6	Elis Manolova (AZE)	1–3 PO1
Tetiana Rizhko (UKR)	6–0 Fall	Viktoria Vesso (EST)	5–0 FA

Knockout round

Semifinals
Kriszta Incze (ROU)	1
Elis Manolova (AZE)	2^{F}
Tetiana Rizhko (UKR)	4^{F}
Sofiya Georgieva (BUL)	0

Finals
Elis Manolova (AZE)	0
Tetiana Rizhko (UKR)	4^{F}
Bronze medal match
Kriszta Incze (ROU)	4
Sofiya Georgieva (BUL)	3

== Final standing ==
Rank	Wrestler	UWW Points
1st place, gold medalist(s)	Tetiana Rizhko (UKR)	10000
2nd place, silver medalist(s)	Elis Manolova (AZE)	8000
3rd place, bronze medalist(s)	Kriszta Incze (ROU)	6500
4	Sofiya Georgieva (BUL)	5800
5	Viktoria Vesso (EST)	5000
6	Aslı Tuğcu (TUR)	4700
