= 2020 European Wrestling Championships – Women's freestyle 65 kg =

Competition at the 2020 European Wrestling Championships

The women's freestyle 65 kg is a competition featured at the 2020 European Wrestling Championships, and was held in Rome, Italy on February 13 and February 14.

== Medalists ==
Gold	Mimi Hristova; Bulgaria
Silver	Elis Manolova; Azerbaijan
Bronze	Maria Kuznetsova; Russia
Bronze	Iryna Koliadenko; Ukraine

== Results ==
Legend

- F — Won by fall

1/8 finals
Mimi Hristova (BUL)	9
Iryna Koliadenko (UKR)	3
Veronica Braschi (ITA)	2
Aslı Tuğcu (TUR)	3
Kriszta Incze (ROU)	2^{F}
Yauheniya Andreichykava (BLR)	0
Gabriella Sleisz (HUN)	10
Ramina Mamedova (LAT)	0

Quarterfinals
Elis Manolova (AZE)	8
Petra Olli (FIN)	1
Henna Johansson (SWE)	5
Maria Kuznetsova (RUS)	6
Mimi Hristova (BUL)	10
Aslı Tuğcu (TUR)	0
Kriszta Incze (ROU)	2
Gabriella Sleisz (HUN)	2

Semifinals
Elis Manolova (AZE)	7^{F}
Maria Kuznetsova (RUS)	3
Mimi Hristova (BUL)	5
Kriszta Incze (ROU)	1

Final
Elis Manolova (AZE)	3
Mimi Hristova (BUL)	6

Repechage round 1
Iryna Koliadenko (UKR)	10
Aslı Tuğcu (TUR)	0

Bronze medal match
Petra Olli (FIN)	4
Maria Kuznetsova (RUS)	8
Iryna Koliadenko (UKR)	8
Kriszta Incze (ROU)	0

== Final standing ==
Rank	Athlete
1st place, gold medalist(s)	Mimi Hristova (BUL)
2nd place, silver medalist(s)	Elis Manolova (AZE)
3rd place, bronze medalist(s)	Maria Kuznetsova (RUS)
3rd place, bronze medalist(s)	Iryna Koliadenko (UKR)
5	Petra Olli (FIN)
5	Kriszta Incze (ROU)
7	Gabriella Sleisz (HUN)
8	Aslı Tuğcu (TUR)
9	Henna Johansson (SWE)
10	Veronica Braschi (ITA)
11	Yauheniya Andreichykava (BLR)
12	Ramina Mamedova (LAT)
