= 2019 European Wrestling Championships – Women's freestyle 65 kg =

The women's freestyle 65 kg is a competition featured at the 2019 European Wrestling Championships, and was held in Bucharest, Romania on April 11 and April 12.

== Medalists ==
Gold	Elis Manolova; Azerbaijan
Silver	Kriszta Incze; Romania
Bronze	Maria Kuznetsova; Russia
Bronze	Petra Olli; Finland

== Results ==
Legend

- F — Won by fall

=== Main Bracket ===
1/8 finals
Luzie Manzke (GER)	7^{F}
Krystsina Fedarashka (BLR)	0
Elis Manolova (AZE)	2
Henna Johansson (SWE)	2
Petra Olli (FIN)	9
Gabriella Sleisz (HUN)	0
Olena Kremzer (UKR)	6^{F}
Viktoria Bobeva (BUL)	0

Quarterfinals
Pauline Lecarpentier (FRA)	3
Maria Kuznetsova (RUS)	5
Aslı Demir (TUR)	1
Kriszta Incze (ROU)	11
Luzie Manzke (GER)	0
Elis Manolova (AZE)	2
Petra Olli (FIN)	4
Olena Kremzer (UKR)	2

Semifinals
Maria Kuznetsova (RUS)	3
Kriszta Incze (ROU)	4
Elis Manolova (AZE)	5^{F}
Petra Olli (FIN)	1

Final
Kriszta Incze (ROU)	4
Elis Manolova (AZE)	6

=== Repechage ===
Repechage round 1
Henna Johansson (SWE)	4^{F}
Luzie Manzke (GER)	0

Bronze medal match
Aslı Demir (TUR)	3
Maria Kuznetsova (RUS)	14
Henna Johansson (SWE)	2
Petra Olli (FIN)	2
