= Maria Kuznetsova (wrestler) =

Russian freestyle wrestler (born 1997)

Mariya Kuznetsova
Personal information
- Native name: Мария Кузнецова
- Full name: Maria Sergeyevna Kuznetsova
- Nationality: Russian
- Born: 17 December 1997 (age 28) Novocheboksarsk, Chuvashia, Russia
- Height: 165 cm (5 ft 5 in)
- Weight: 62 kg (137 lb); 65 kg

Sport
- Country: Russia
- Sport: Amateur wrestling
- Event: Freestyle
Medal record
Women's freestyle wrestling
Representing Russia
European Games
| Bronze medal – third place | 2019 Minsk | 62 kg |
European Championships
| Bronze medal – third place | 2019 Bucharest | 65 kg |
| Bronze medal – third place | 2020 Rome | 65 kg |
Military World Games
| Silver medal – second place | 2019 Wuhan | 62 kg |
Golden Grand Prix Ivan Yarygin
| Gold medal – first place | 2019 Krasnoyarsk | 65 kg |
| Gold medal – first place | 2020 Krasnoyarsk | 65 kg |
World U23 Championships
| Bronze medal – third place | 2018 Bucharest | 65 kg |
European U23 Championship
| Gold medal – first place | 2018 Istanbul | 65 kg |
| Gold medal – first place | 2019 Novi Sad | 65 kg |
| Bronze medal – third place | 2017 Szombathely | 63 kg |

Mariya Sergeyevna Kuznetsova (born 17 December 1997) is a Russian freestyle wrestler of Chuvash origin. She is a two-time bronze medalist at the European Wrestling Championships.

== Career ==
Kuznetsova competed in the 65 kg event at the 2018 European Wrestling Championships held in Kaspiysk, Russia. In that same year, she won the gold medal in her event at the 2018 Russian National Women's Freestyle Wrestling Championships.

In 2019, Kuznetsova represented Russia at the European Games in Minsk, Belarus and she won one of the bronze medals in the 62 kg event. A few months later, at the 2019 Military World Games held in Wuhan, China, she won the silver medal in the women's 62 kg event.

In 2019, Kuznetsova also won a bronze medal in the 65 kg event at the European Wrestling Championships held in Bucharest, Romania. The following year, she won a bronze medal in this event at the 2020 European Wrestling Championships held in Rome, Italy. In 2020, she also competed in the women's 65 kg event at the Individual Wrestling World Cup held in Belgrade, Serbia where she lost her bronze medal match against Mimi Hristova of Bulgaria.

In 2022, Kuznetsova competed at the Yasar Dogu Tournament held in Istanbul, Turkey.

== Achievements ==
| Year | Tournament | Location | Result | Event |
|---|---|---|---|---|
| 2018 | National Championships | Smolensk, Russia | 1st | Freestyle 65 kg |
| 2019 | European Championships | Bucharest, Romania | 3rd | Freestyle 65 kg |
| 2019 | European Games | Minsk, Belarus | 3rd | Freestyle 62 kg |
| 2019 | Military World Games | Wuhan, China | 2nd | Freestyle 62 kg |
| 2020 | European Championships | Rome, Italy | 3rd | Freestyle 65 kg |
