= 2023 U23 World Wrestling Championships – Women's freestyle 65 kg =

Wrestling competitions

Women's freestyle 65 kg at the 2023 U23 World Championships
- Venue: Tirana Olympic Park
- Dates: 26–27 October
- Competitors: 18 from 15 nations

Medalists
gold medal	Irina Rîngaci	Moldova
silver medal	Amina Tandelova	Authorised Neutral Athletes
bronze medal	Monika Sheoran
bronze medal	Yulia Leskovets	Ukraine

The women's freestyle 65 kilograms is a competition featured at the 2023 U23 World Wrestling Championships, and will held in Tirana, Albania on 26 and 27 October 2023.

This freestyle wrestling competition consists of a single-elimination tournament, with a repechage used to determine the winner of two bronze medals. The two finalists face off for gold and silver medals. Each wrestler who loses to one of the two finalists moves into the repechage, culminating in a pair of bronze medal matches featuring the semifinal losers each facing the remaining repechage opponent from their half of the bracket.

== Results ==
Legend

- F — Won by fall

=== Final ===
Final
Irina Rîngaci (MDA)	2^{F}
Amina Tandelova (ANA)	0

=== Top half ===
Round of 32
Macey Kilty (USA)	6^{F}
Gilbery García (VEN)	0

Round of 16
Marta Ojeda (ESP)	0
Roxana Capezan (ROU)	10
Macey Kilty (USA)	10^{F}
Kseniya Tsiarenia (ANA)	0
Büşra Efe (TUR)	4
Albina Kairgeldinova (KAZ)	3
Irina Rîngaci (MDA)	2^{F}
Monika Sheoran (UWW)	0

Quarterfinals
Roxana Capezan (ROU)	0
Macey Kilty (USA)	2^{F}
Büşra Efe (TUR)	0
Irina Rîngaci (MDA)	4^{F}

Semifinals
Macey Kilty (USA)	4
Irina Rîngaci (MDA)	5

=== Bottom half ===
Round of 32
Rin Teramoto (JPN)	3
Iva Gerić (CRO)	0

Round of 16
Elma Zeidlere (LAT)	4^{F}
Samantha Adams (CAN)	0
Karolina Pók (HUN)	6^{F}
Iris Thiébaux (FRA)	2
Yulia Leskovets (UKR)	6
Rin Teramoto (JPN)	1
Amina Tandelova (ANA)	11
Nigar Mirzazada (AZE)	0

Quarterfinals
Elma Zeidlere (LAT)	3
Karolina Pók (HUN)	1
Yulia Leskovets (UKR)	4
Amina Tandelova (ANA)	6

Semifinals
Elma Zeidlere (LAT)	2
Amina Tandelova (ANA)	6

=== Repechage ===
Repechage round 2
Monika Sheoran (UWW)	3
Büşra Efe (TUR)	1
Nigar Mirzazada (AZE)	0
Yulia Leskovets (UKR)	6^{F}

Bronze medals
Monika Sheoran (UWW)	5
Macey Kilty (USA)	4
Yulia Leskovets (UKR)	3
Elma Zeidlere (LAT)	1
