= 2022 World Wrestling Championships – Women's freestyle 65 kg =

Wrestling competitions

Women's freestyle 65 kg at the 2022 World Championships
- Venue: Štark Arena
- Dates: 13–14 September 2022
- Competitors: 14 from 14 nations

Medalists
gold medal	Miwa Morikawa	Japan
silver medal	Long Jia	China
bronze medal	Mallory Velte	United States
bronze medal	Koumba Larroque	France

The women's freestyle 65 kilograms is a competition featured at the 2022 World Wrestling Championships, and was held in Belgrade, Serbia on 13 and 14 September 2022. The qualification rounds were held on 13 September while medal matches were held on the 2nd day of the competition. A total of 14 wrestlers competed in this event, limited to athletes whose body weight was less than 65 kilograms.

This freestyle wrestling competition consists of a single-elimination tournament, with a repechage used to determine the winner of two bronze medals. The two finalists face off for gold and silver medals. Each wrestler who loses to one of the two finalists moves into the repechage, culminating in a pair of bronze medal matches featuring the semifinal losers each facing the remaining repechage opponent from their half of the bracket.

Asian champion and 2021 World Wrestling Championships runner-up Miwa Morikawa of Japan won the gold medal after beating Long Jia from China 2–0 after six minutes. The Japanese won by scoring a stepout and an activity point, both in the first period and defending her lead for the rest of the match.

Mallory Velte of the United States of America and Koumba Larroque from France shared the bronze medals. Velte beat Mimi Hristova of Bulgaria 11–2 in one of the bronze medal bouts, while France's Larroque recorded a close 3–2 win on points over the second seed Elis Manolova of Azerbaijan to win the other bronze medal.

== Results ==
=== Main bracket ===
Round of 16
Ölziisaikhany Pürevsüren (MGL)	4
Mallory Velte (USA)	14
Tetiana Rizhko (UKR)	10
Dinora Rustamova (UZB)	0
Yelena Shalygina (KAZ)	1
Mimi Hristova (BUL)	11
Kriszta Incze (ROU)	7
Aleah Nickel (CAN)	0
Shafali Sharma (IND)	0
Koumba Larroque (FRA)	10
Aslı Demir (TUR)	0
Long Jia (CHN)	8

Quarterfinals
Miwa Morikawa (JPN)	2
Mallory Velte (USA)	0
Tetiana Rizhko (UKR)	8
Mimi Hristova (BUL)	12
Kriszta Incze (ROU)	2
Koumba Larroque (FRA)	5
Long Jia (CHN)	6
Elis Manolova (AZE)	3

Semifinals
Miwa Morikawa (JPN)	3
Mimi Hristova (BUL)	0
Koumba Larroque (FRA)	7
Long Jia (CHN)	9

Final
Miwa Morikawa (JPN)	2
Long Jia (CHN)	0

=== Repechage ===
Repechage round 1
Aslı Demir (TUR)	5
Elis Manolova (AZE)	5

Bronze medals
Mallory Velte (USA)	11
Mimi Hristova (BUL)	2
Elis Manolova (AZE)	2
Koumba Larroque (FRA)	3

== Final standing ==
Rank	Athlete
1st place, gold medalist(s)	Miwa Morikawa (JPN)
2nd place, silver medalist(s)	Long Jia (CHN)
3rd place, bronze medalist(s)	Mallory Velte (USA)
3rd place, bronze medalist(s)	Koumba Larroque (FRA)
5	Mimi Hristova (BUL)
5	Elis Manolova (AZE)
7	Tetiana Rizhko (UKR)
8	Kriszta Incze (ROU)
9	Aslı Demir (TUR)
10	Ölziisaikhany Pürevsüren (MGL)
11	Yelena Shalygina (KAZ)
12	Aleah Nickel (CAN)
13	Dinora Rustamova (UZB)
14	Shafali Sharma (IND)
