= Kriszta Incze =

Romanian freestyle wrestler

Personal information
- Full name: Kriszta Tunde Incze
- Born: 15 May 1996 (age 30) Sfântu Gheorghe, Romania
- Height: 167 cm (5 ft 6 in)

Sport
- Country: Romania
- Sport: Amateur wrestling
- Weight class: 62 kg; 65 kg
- Event: Freestyle
Medal record
Women's freestyle wrestling
Representing Romania
European Games
Bronze medal – third place	2019 Minsk	62 kg
European Championships
Silver medal – second place	2019 Bucharest	65 kg
Bronze medal – third place	2021 Warsaw	65 kg
Bronze medal – third place	2022 Budapest	65 kg
Bronze medal – third place	2023 Zagreb	65 kg
Jeux de la Francophonie
Bronze medal – third place	2017 Abidjan	63 kg
Grand Prix
Silver medal – second place	2026 Tirana	65 kg
Bronze medal – third place	2026 Zagreb	65 kg
European U23 Championship
Bronze medal – third place	2018 Istanbul	62 kg

Kriszta Tunde Incze (Hungarian: Incze Kriszta Tünde; born 15 May 1996) is a Romanian freestyle wrestler. She is a four-time medalist at the European Wrestling Championships. In 2019, she represented Romania at the European Games in Minsk, Belarus and won one of the bronze medals in the 62 kg event. Incze also represented Romania at the 2020 Summer Olympics in Tokyo, Japan and 2024 Summer Olympics in Paris, France.

== Career ==
Incze competed in the women's freestyle 63 kg event at the 2015 World Wrestling Championships in Las Vegas, United States. In 2016, she competed at the World Olympic Qualification Tournament held in Istanbul, Turkey hoping to qualify for the 2016 Summer Olympics in Rio de Janeiro, Brazil. A few months later, Incze won the silver medal in the women's 63 kg event at the 2016 World University Wrestling Championships held in Çorum, Turkey. She lost her bronze medal match in the 60 kg event at the 2017 European Wrestling Championships held in Novi Sad, Serbia. In 2018, Incze won the bronze medal in the 62 kg event at the European U23 Wrestling Championship held in Istanbul, Turkey.

Incze won the silver medal in the 65 kg event at the 2019 European Wrestling Championships held in Bucharest, Romania. In the final, she lost against Elis Manolova of Azerbaijan. In 2020, Incze competed in the women's 62 kg event at the 2020 Individual Wrestling World Cup held in Belgrade, Serbia.

In March 2021, Incze competed at the European Qualification Tournament in Budapest, Hungary hoping to qualify for the 2020 Summer Olympics in Tokyo, Japan. She did not qualify as she was eliminated in her second match by Elif Jale Yeşilırmak of Turkey. A month later, she won one of the bronze medals in the 65 kg event at the 2021 European Wrestling Championships held in Warsaw, Poland. She also failed to qualify for the Olympics at the World Olympic Qualification Tournament held in Sofia, Bulgaria. However, as North Korea withdrew from the 2020 Summer Olympics, Incze received a place to compete in the women's 62 kg event as Rim Jong-sim of North Korea was no longer able to compete.

In August 2021, Incze competed in the women's 62 kg event at the 2020 Summer Olympics held in Tokyo, Japan. She won her first match against Marianna Sastin of Hungary and she then lost her next match against eventual silver medalist Aisuluu Tynybekova of Kyrgyzstan. In the repechage she was then eliminated by Anastasija Grigorjeva of Latvia. Two months after the Olympics, Incze competed in the women's 65 kg event at the 2021 World Wrestling Championships held in Oslo, Norway where she was eliminated in her first match by Aina Temirtassova of Kazakhstan.

In 2022, Incze competed at the Yasar Dogu Tournament held in Istanbul, Turkey. In April 2022, she won the bronze medal in the 65 kg event at the European Wrestling Championships held in Budapest, Hungary. A few months later, she won the bronze medal in her event at the Matteo Pellicone Ranking Series 2022 held in Rome, Italy. Incze competed in the 65 kg event at the 2022 World Wrestling Championships held in Belgrade, Serbia. She was eliminated in her second match by eventual bronze medalist Koumba Larroque of France.

Incze won one of the bronze medals in the 65 kg event at the 2023 European Wrestling Championships held in Zagreb, Croatia. She competed at the 2024 European Wrestling Olympic Qualification Tournament in Baku, Azerbaijan hoping to qualify for the 2024 Summer Olympics in Paris, France. Incze was eliminated in her first match and she did not qualify for the Olympics at this event. A month later, Incze earned a quota place for Romania for the Olympics at the 2024 World Wrestling Olympic Qualification Tournament held in Istanbul, Turkey. She competed in the women's 62 kg event at the Olympics. Incze lost her first match against eventual gold medalist Sakura Motoki of Japan and she was then eliminated in the repechage by Ana Godinez of Canada.

== Achievements ==
Year	Tournament	Location	Result	Event
2017	Jeux de la Francophonie	Abidjan, Ivory Coast	3rd	Freestyle 63 kg
2019	European Championships	Bucharest, Romania	2nd	Freestyle 65 kg
2019	European Games	Minsk, Belarus	3rd	Freestyle 62 kg
2021	European Championships	Warsaw, Poland	3rd	Freestyle 65 kg
2022	European Championships	Budapest, Hungary	3rd	Freestyle 65 kg
2023	European Championships	Zagreb, Croatia	3rd	Freestyle 65 kg

== Personal life ==
She is of Hungarian descent.
