= 2014 European Wrestling Championships – Women's freestyle 55 kg =

Wrestling competitions

The women's freestyle 55 kg is a competition featured at the 2014 European Wrestling Championships, and was held in Vantaa, Finland on 1 April 2014.

== Medalists ==
Gold	Sofia Mattsson; Sweden
Silver	Anna Zwirydowska; Poland
Bronze	Irina Ologonova; Russia
Bronze	Mimi Hristova; Bulgaria

== Results ==
Legend

- F — Won by fall

=== Bracket ===
Round of 16
Ana Pereira (POR)	0
Anna Zwirydowska (POL)	11
Emese Barka (HUN)	12
Zalina Sidakova (BLR)	0
Aurélie Basset (FRA)	11
Tiina Vainionpää (FIN)	1

Quarterfinals
Iryna Husyak (UKR)	1
Irina Ologonova (RUS)	2
Sofia Mattsson (SWE)	7^{F}
Bediha Gün (TUR)	0
Mimi Hristova (BUL)	2
Anna Zwirydowska (POL)	6
Emese Barka (HUN)	7
Aurélie Basset (FRA)	13

Semifinals
Irina Ologonova (RUS)	0
Sofia Mattsson (SWE)	10
Anna Zwirydowska (POL)	10
Aurélie Basset (FRA)	0

Final
Sofia Mattsson (SWE)	6^{F}
Anna Zwirydowska (POL)	0

=== Repechage ===
Repechage round 1
Mimi Hristova (BUL)	4^{F}
Ana Pereira (POR)	0

Bronze medal match
Bediha Gün (TUR)	0
Irina Ologonova (RUS)	7
Mimi Hristova (BUL)	6
Aurélie Basset (FRA)	4
