= 2021 European Wrestling Championships – Women's freestyle 65 kg =

Wrestling competition

The women's freestyle 65 kg is a competition featured at the 2021 European Wrestling Championships, and was held in Warsaw, Poland on April 22 and April 23.

== Medalists ==
Gold	Irina Rîngaci; Moldova
Silver	Tetiana Rizhko; Ukraine
Bronze	Aleksandra Wólczyńska; Poland
Bronze	Kriszta Incze; Romania

== Results ==
Legend

- F — Won by fall

1/8 finals
Henna Johansson (SWE)	2
Sofiya Georgieva (BUL)	8
Irina Netreba (AZE)	2
Tatsiana Paulava (BLR)	0
Kriszta Incze (ROU)	3
Tetiana Rizhko (UKR)	4
Aslı Tuğcu (TUR)	1
Lyubov Ovcharova (RUS)	11

Quarterfinals
Aleksandra Wólczyńska (POL)	7
Eyleen Sewina (GER)	5
Irina Rîngaci (MDA)	10
Alīna Antipova (LAT)	0
Sofiya Georgieva (BUL)	4
Irina Netreba (AZE)	10
Tetiana Rizhko (UKR)	10
Lyubov Ovcharova (RUS)	0

Semifinals
Aleksandra Wólczyńska (POL)	2
Irina Rîngaci (MDA)	13
Irina Netreba (AZE)	1
Tetiana Rizhko (UKR)	11

Final
Irina Rîngaci (MDA)	10
Tetiana Rizhko (UKR)	0

Repechage round 1
Kriszta Incze (ROU)	2
Lyubov Ovcharova (RUS)	2

Bronze medal match
Alīna Antipova (LAT)	0
Aleksandra Wólczyńska (POL)	6^{F}
Kriszta Incze (ROU)	4
Irina Netreba (AZE)	3

== Final standing ==
Rank	Athlete
1st place, gold medalist(s)	Irina Rîngaci (MDA)
2nd place, silver medalist(s)	Tetiana Rizhko (UKR)
3rd place, bronze medalist(s)	Aleksandra Wólczyńska (POL)
3rd place, bronze medalist(s)	Kriszta Incze (ROU)
5	Alīna Antipova (LAT)
5	Irina Netreba (AZE)
7	Lyubov Ovcharova (RUS)
8	Sofiya Georgieva (BUL)
9	Eyleen Sewina (GER)
10	Henna Johansson (SWE)
11	Aslı Tuğcu (TUR)
12	Tatsiana Paulava (BLR)
