= 2018 Russian National Women's Freestyle Wrestling Championships =

Sporting event

2018 Russian Women's Nationals
- Host city: Smolensk, Smolensk Oblast, Russia
- Dates: August 10–13
- Stadium: "Anniversary" Palace of Sport (2600 seats)

2018 Russian National Women's Freestyle Wrestling Championships (also known as the Russian Women's Nationals 2018) was the national ranking tournament for the Russian international wrestling squad for the year of 2018, it was held in Smolensk, Russia from 10 August - 13 August. This event was held in the 1150th Anniversary Palace of Sport.

== Medal overview ==
=== Medal table ===
| Rank | Nation | Gold | Silver | Bronze | Total |
|---|---|---|---|---|---|
| 1 | Krasnoyarsk Krai | 2 | 3 | 4 | 9 |
| 2 | Buryatia | 2 | 3 | 2 | 7 |
| 3 | Kemerovo Oblast | 1 | 2 | 2 | 5 |
| 4 | (Saint Petersburg) St. Petersburg | 1 | 1 | 0 | 2 |
| 5 | Rostov-on-Don | 1 | 0 | 1 | 2 |
| 6 | Chuvashia | 1 | 0 | 0 | 1 |
| 6 | Irkutsk Oblast | 1 | 0 | 0 | 1 |
| 6 | Ulyanovsk Oblast | 1 | 0 | 0 | 1 |
| 9 | Moscow Oblast | 0 | 1 | 2 | 3 |
| 10 | Bryansk Oblast | 0 | 0 | 2 | 2 |
| 10 | Dagestan | 0 | 0 | 2 | 2 |
| 12 | Kaliningrad Oblast | 0 | 0 | 1 | 1 |
| 12 | Khakassia | 0 | 0 | 1 | 1 |
| 12 | Krasnodar Krai | 0 | 0 | 1 | 1 |
| 12 | Tatarstan | 0 | 0 | 1 | 1 |
| Totals (15 entries) | | 10 | 10 | 19 | 39 |

=== Women's freestyle ===
| Event | Gold | Silver | Bronze |
|---|---|---|---|
| 50 kg | (Saint Petersburg) Anzhelika Vetoshkina | (Krasnoyarsk Krai) Elena Vostrikova | (Khakassia) Maria Tyumerekova |
| 50 kg | (Saint Petersburg) Anzhelika Vetoshkina | (Krasnoyarsk Krai) Elena Vostrikova | (Krasnodar Krai) Daria Leksina |
| 53 kg | (Buryatia) Stalvira Orshush | (Kemerovo Oblast) Alena Kuular | (Krasnoyarsk Krai) Ekaterina Isakova |
| 53 kg | (Buryatia) Stalvira Orshush | (Kemerovo Oblast) Alena Kuular | (Kemerovo Oblast) Nadezhda Tryetiakova |
| 55 kg | (Kemerovo Oblast) Lyubov Salnikova | (Moscow Oblast) Maria Gurova | (Buryatia) Nina Menkenova |
| 55 kg | (Kemerovo Oblast) Lyubov Salnikova | (Moscow Oblast) Maria Gurova | (Rostov-on-Don) Marinya Simonyan |
| 57 kg | (Krasnoyarsk Krai) Olga Khoroshavtseva | (Buryatia) Irina Ologonova | (Kaliningrad Oblast) Alexandra Andreeva |
| 57 kg | (Krasnoyarsk Krai) Olga Khoroshavtseva | (Buryatia) Irina Ologonova | (Dagestan) Khadizhat Murtuzalieva |
| 59 kg | (Chuvashia) Veronika Chumikova | (Kemerovo Oblast) Zelfira Sadraddinova | (Buryatia) Alena Sangadieva |
| 59 kg | (Chuvashia) Veronika Chumikova | (Kemerovo Oblast) Zelfira Sadraddinova | (Tatarstan) Svetlana Lipatova |
| 62 kg | (Ulyanovsk Oblast) Inna Trazhukova | (Buryatia) Ulyana Tukurenova | (Bryansk Oblast) Daria Bobrulko |
| 62 kg | (Ulyanovsk Oblast) Inna Trazhukova | (Buryatia) Ulyana Tukurenova | (Bryansk Oblast) Tatyana Smolyak |
| 65 kg | (Buryatia) Maria Kuznetsova | (Buryatia) Anna Shebrakova | (Kemerovo Oblast) Natalya Fedoseeva |
| 65 kg | (Buryatia) Maria Kuznetsova | (Buryatia) Anna Shebrakova | (Moscow Oblast) Anzhela Fomenko |
| 68 kg | (Krasnoyarsk Krai) Anastasia Bratchikova | (Krasnoyarsk Krai) Yuliya Maksimova | (Moscow Oblast) Inna Dokhnevskaya |
| 68 kg | (Krasnoyarsk Krai) Anastasia Bratchikova | (Krasnoyarsk Krai) Yuliya Maksimova | (Krasnoyarsk Krai) Khanum Velieva |
| 72 kg | (Rostov-on-Don) Tatiana Kolesnikova | (Saint Petersburg) Alena Perepelkina | (Krasnoyarsk Krai) Alena Starodubtseva |
| 76 kg | (Irkutsk Oblast) Ekaterina Bukina | (Krasnoyarsk Krai) Ksenia Burakova | (Dagestan) Daria Shisterova |
| 76 kg | (Irkutsk Oblast) Ekaterina Bukina | (Krasnoyarsk Krai) Ksenia Burakova | (Krasnoyarsk Krai) Kristina Shumova |
