= Elis Manolova =

Bulgarian-born Azerbaijani freestyle wrestler

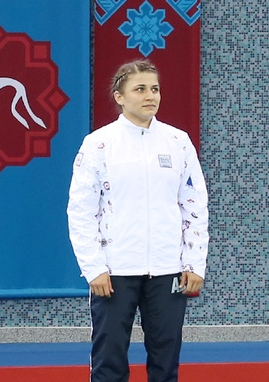
- Manolova in 2017

Personal information
- Native name: Элис Манолова
- Born: 17 January 1996 (age 30)

Sport
- Country: Bulgaria (until 2015); Azerbaijan (since 2015)
- Sport: Amateur wrestling
- Weight class: 65 kg
- Event: Freestyle
Medal record
Women's freestyle wrestling
Representing Azerbaijan
World Championships
Bronze medal – third place	2019 Nur-Sultan	65 kg
European Championships
Gold medal – first place	2019 Bucharest	65 kg
Silver medal – second place	2018 Kaspiysk	65 kg
Silver medal – second place	2020 Rome	65 kg
Silver medal – second place	2022 Budapest	65 kg
Bronze medal – third place	2024 Bucharest	65 kg
Individual World Cup
Bronze medal – third place	2020 Belgrade	65 kg
Islamic Solidarity Games
Gold medal – first place	2017 Baku	69 kg
Silver medal – second place	2021 Konya	65 kg
Golden Grand Prix Ivan Yarygin
Bronze medal – third place	2017 Krasnoyarsk	69 kg
World U23 Championships
Silver medal – second place	2018 Bucharest	65 kg
European U23 Championships
Bronze medal – third place	2016 Ruse	69 kg

Elis Manolova (Bulgarian: Элис Манолова, born 17 January 1996) is a Bulgarian-born Azerbaijani freestyle wrestler. At the 2019 World Wrestling Championships held in Nur-Sultan, Kazakhstan, she won one of the bronze medals in the women's 65 kg event. She is also a five-time medalist, including gold, at the European Wrestling Championships. Manolova represented Azerbaijan at the 2020 Summer Olympics in Tokyo, Japan.

== Career ==
Manolova represented Bulgaria in several cadet wrestling events before switching to Azerbaijan in 2015. As one of her first senior level competitions, she competed in the women's 69 kg event at the 2015 World Wrestling Championships held in Las Vegas, United States. She was eliminated in her first match by Elmira Syzdykova of Kazakhstan.

Manolova competed at the 2016 European Wrestling Olympic Qualification Tournament hoping to qualify for the 2016 Summer Olympics in Rio de Janeiro, Brazil. She did not qualify for the Olympics and she also lost her bronze medal match against Alina Berezhna of Ukraine. A month later, Manolova tried again at the World Olympic Qualification Tournament held in Istanbul, Turkey but she could no longer qualify after losing her first match against Monika Michalik of Poland. Michalik went on to qualify for the 2016 Summer Olympics and she also became one of the bronze medalists in the women's 63 kg event.

In 2017, Manolova won one of the bronze medals in the women's 69 kg event at the Golden Grand Prix Ivan Yarygin held in Krasnoyarsk, Russia. A few months later, in May 2017, she lost her bronze medal match in the women's 69 kg event at the European Wrestling Championships held in Novi Sad, Serbia. In that same month, at the Islamic Solidarity Games held in Baku, Azerbaijan, Manolova won the gold medal in the women's 69 kg event. In the final, she defeated Zhamila Bakbergenova of Kazakhstan. Lastly, she also competed in the women's 69 kg event at the 2017 World Wrestling Championships held in Paris, France.

In 2018, at the European Wrestling Championships held in Kaspiysk, Dagestan, Russia, Manolova won the silver medal in the women's 65 kg event. In 2019, she won the gold medal in that event. She defeated Kriszta Incze of Romania in her gold medal match. The following year, Manolova won the silver medal in the 65 kg event at the 2020 European Wrestling Championships held in Rome, Italy. In that same year, she also won one of the bronze medals in the women's 65 kg event at the 2020 Individual Wrestling World Cup held in Belgrade, Serbia.

In March 2021, Manolova competed at the European Qualification Tournament in Budapest, Hungary hoping to qualify for the 2020 Summer Olympics in Tokyo, Japan. She won her first two matches but then lost her match in the semi-finals against Khanum Velieva. In April 2021, Manolova was eliminated in her second match in the 68 kg event at the European Wrestling Championships held in Warsaw, Poland. In May 2021, she qualified at the World Olympic Qualification Tournament to represent Azerbaijan at the 2020 Summer Olympics.

Manolova competed in the women's 68 kg event at the 2020 Summer Olympics where she lost her first match against eventual silver medalist Blessing Oborududu of Nigeria. She was then eliminated in the repechage by eventual bronze medalist Meerim Zhumanazarova of Kyrgyzstan. Two months after the Olympics, Manolova competed in the women's 65 kg event at the 2021 World Wrestling Championships held in Oslo, Norway where she was eliminated in her first match by Koumba Larroque of France.

In 2022, Manolova won one of the bronze medals in the 65 kg event at the Dan Kolov & Nikola Petrov Tournament held in Veliko Tarnovo, Bulgaria. She lost her bronze medal match in her event at the Yasar Dogu Tournament held in Istanbul, Turkey.

In April 2022, Manolova won the silver medal in the 65 kg event at the European Wrestling Championships held in Budapest, Hungary. A few months later, she also won the silver medal in the 65 kg event at the 2021 Islamic Solidarity Games held in Konya, Turkey. Manolova lost her bronze medal match in the 65 kg event at the 2022 World Wrestling Championships held in Belgrade, Serbia.

In 2023, Manolova competed in the 65 kg event at the European Wrestling Championships held in Zagreb, Croatia. She lost her first match against Irina Rîngaci of Moldova and she was then eliminated in the repechage by Kendra Dacher of France. Rîngaci went on to win the silver medal.

Manolova won one of the bronze medals in the 65 kg event at the 2024 European Wrestling Championships held in Bucharest, Romania. She defeated Anne Nürnberger of Germany in her bronze medal match. Manolova competed at the 2024 European Wrestling Olympic Qualification Tournament in Baku, Azerbaijan hoping to qualify for the 2024 Summer Olympics in Paris, France. She was eliminated in her first match and she did not qualify for the Olympics. Manolova also competed at the 2024 World Wrestling Olympic Qualification Tournament held in Istanbul, Turkey without qualifying for the Olympics. She was eliminated in her first match.

On 28 June 2025, the Azerbaijan Wrestling Federation announced that Manolova had ended her career.

== Achievements ==
Year	Tournament	Location	Result	Event
2017	Islamic Solidarity Games	Baku, Azerbaijan	1st	Freestyle 69 kg
2018	European Championships	Kaspiysk, Russia	2nd	Freestyle 65 kg
2019	European Championships	Bucharest, Romania	1st	Freestyle 65 kg
2019	World Championships	Nur-Sultan, Kazakhstan	3rd	Freestyle 65 kg
2020	European Championships	Rome, Italy	2nd	Freestyle 65 kg
2022	European Championships	Budapest, Hungary	2nd	Freestyle 65 kg
2022	Islamic Solidarity Games	Konya, Turkey	2nd	Freestyle 65 kg
2024	European Championships	Bucharest, Romania	3rd	Freestyle 65 kg
