= 2021 World Wrestling Olympic Qualification Tournament =

- Host city: Sofia, Bulgaria
- Dates: 6–9 May 2021
- Stadium: Arena Armeets

The 2021 World Wrestling Olympic Qualification Tournament was the last wrestling qualification tournament for the 2020 Summer Olympics in Tokyo, Japan. The event was held from 6 to 9 May 2021, in Sofia, Bulgaria.

== Qualification summary ==
A total of 36 athletes secured a spot in the 2020 Summer Olympics, in Tokyo, Japan. Two spots were given to each of the weight classes in every event. This allows a total of 12 available spots for each event. Every winner and runner-up per class were awarded their place for wrestling, at the 2020 Summer Olympics. Quota places are allocated to the respective NOC and not to the competitor that achieved the place in the qualification event.

NOC	Men's freestyle						Men's Greco-Roman						Women's freestyle						Total
NOC	57	65	74	86	97	125	60	67	77	87	97	130	50	53	57	62	68	76	Total
Armenia							X	X											2
Azerbaijan									X								X		2
Belarus			X																1
Bulgaria									X								X		2
Croatia										X									1
Czech Republic											X								1
Ecuador													X						1
Finland												X							1
France															X				1
Greece		X																	1
Hungary											X								1
India						X							X						2
Italy					X														1
Japan	X			X															2
Moldova							X												1
Mongolia	X															X			2
Poland		X																	1
Romania					X							X		X					3
ROC						X								X	X	X			4
Serbia										X									1
Slovakia				X															1
Turkey																		X	1
Ukraine			X					X										X	3
Total: 16 NOCs	2	2	2	2	2	2	2	2	2	2	2	2	2	2	2	2	2	2	36

== Men's freestyle ==
=== 57 kg ===
6–7 May

Round of 32
Giorgi Edisherashvili (AZE)	4–0 Ret	Otari Gogava (GEO)
Anatolii Buruian (MDA)	6–9	Muhammad Bilal (PAK)
~~Chakir Ansari (MAR)~~	WO	Kim Sung-gwon (KOR)
Richard García (PAN)	2–13	Muhamad Ikromov (TJK)
~~Junjun Asebias (FSM)~~	WO	Givi Davidovi (ITA)
Niklas Stechele (GER)	8–8 Fall	Juan Rubelín Ramírez (DOM)
Mohamed Camara (GUI)	0–11	Taras Markovych (UKR)

Round of 16
Yuki Takahashi (JPN)	10
Răzvan Kovacs (ROU)	0
Vladimir Egorov (MKD)	11
Levan Metreveli (ESP)	0
Uladzislau Andreyeu (BLR)	2
Reineri Andreu (CUB)	5
Pedro Mejías (VEN)	0
Almaz Smanbekov (KGZ)	10
Giorgi Edisherashvili (AZE)	6
Muhammad Bilal (PAK)	2
Kim Sung-gwon (KOR)	0
Muhamad Ikromov (TJK)	10
Givi Davidovi (ITA)	2
Niklas Stechele (GER)	1
Taras Markovych (UKR)	0
Erdenebatyn Bekhbayar (MGL)	14

Quarterfinals
Yuki Takahashi (JPN)	11
Vladimir Egorov (MKD)	0
Reineri Andreu (CUB)	8
Almaz Smanbekov (KGZ)	5
Giorgi Edisherashvili (AZE)	11
Muhamad Ikromov (TJK)	4
Givi Davidovi (ITA)	2
Erdenebatyn Bekhbayar (MGL)	3

Semifinals
Yuki Takahashi (JPN)	2
Reineri Andreu (CUB)	0
Giorgi Edisherashvili (AZE)	2
Erdenebatyn Bekhbayar (MGL)	6

Final
Yuki Takahashi (JPN)	1
Erdenebatyn Bekhbayar (MGL)	0^{R}

Repechage round 2
~~Răzvan Kovacs (ROU)~~
~~Vladimir Egorov (MKD)~~
Taras Markovych (UKR)	9
Givi Davidovi (ITA)	6

Bronze medals
Bye
~~Reineri Andreu (CUB)~~
Taras Markovych (UKR)	WO
~~Giorgi Edisherashvili (AZE)~~

=== 65 kg ===
6–7 May

Round of 32
Nicolai Grahmez (MDA)	16–6	Alexander Semisorow (GER)
Vilson Ndregjoni (ALB)	1–7	Úber Cuero (COL)
George Ramm (GBR)	4–14	Georgios Pilidis (GRE)
Colin Realbuto (ITA)	13–2	Marcos Siqueira (BRA)
Fati Vejseli (MKD)	2–8	Juan Pablo González (ESP)
Hor Ohannesian (UKR)	5–1	Sebastian Rivera (PUR)
~~Mbundé Cumba (GBS)~~		~~Hussein Al-Azzani (YEM)~~
Jordan Oliver (USA)	6–2	Ruhan Rasim (BUL)
Yun Jun-sik (KOR)	WO	~~Ilyas Bekbulatov (UZB)~~
Álbaro Rudesindo (DOM)	0–10	Nikolay Okhlopkov (ROU)
Beka Lomtadze (GEO)	6–4	Dillon Williams (CAN)
Gabriel Janatsch (AUT)	0–11	Magomedmurad Gadzhiev (POL)

Round of 16
Selahattin Kılıçsallayan (TUR)	8
Ilman Mukhtarov (FRA)	9
David Habat (SLO)	7
Nicolai Grahmez (MDA)	5
Úber Cuero (COL)	0
Georgios Pilidis (GRE)	9
Colin Realbuto (ITA)	5
Juan Pablo González (ESP)	6
Hor Ohannesian (UKR)
Bye
Jordan Oliver (USA)	5
Yun Jun-sik (KOR)	4
Nikolay Okhlopkov (ROU)	1
Beka Lomtadze (GEO)	4
Magomedmurad Gadzhiev (POL)	4
Niurgun Skriabin (BLR)	2

Quarterfinals
Ilman Mukhtarov (FRA)	0
David Habat (SLO)	10
Georgios Pilidis (GRE)	10
Juan Pablo González (ESP)	0
Hor Ohannesian (UKR)	3
Jordan Oliver (USA)	3
Beka Lomtadze (GEO)	1
Magomedmurad Gadzhiev (POL)	2

Semifinals
David Habat (SLO)	7
Georgios Pilidis (GRE)	9
Jordan Oliver (USA)	2
Magomedmurad Gadzhiev (POL)	3

Final
Georgios Pilidis (GRE)
Magomedmurad Gadzhiev (POL)	WO

Repechage round 1
George Ramm (GBR)	2
Úber Cuero (COL)	12
Gabriel Janatsch (AUT)	0
Niurgun Skriabin (BLR)	6^{F}

Repechage round 2
Úber Cuero (COL)	7
Juan Pablo González (ESP)	4
Niurgun Skriabin (BLR)	6
Beka Lomtadze (GEO)	4

Bronze medals
Úber Cuero (COL)	WO
David Habat (SLO)
Niurgun Skriabin (BLR)	WO
Jordan Oliver (USA)

=== 74 kg ===
6–7 May

Round of 32
Malik Amine (SMR)	2–3	Ayoub Barraj (TUN)
Vasyl Mykhailov (UKR)	6–2	Bat-Erdeniin Byambadorj (MGL)
Ogbonna John (NGR)	0–10	Georgios Kougioumtsidis (GRE)
Simon Marchl (AUT)	6–11	Arman Andreasyan (ARM)
Julio Rodríguez (DOM)	10–0	Abdulrahman Ibrahim (QAT)
Mitch Finesilver (ISR)	7–0	Gong Byung-min (KOR)
~~Francisco Kadima (ANG)~~	WO	Jorge Llano (ARG)
Jasmit Phulka (CAN)	0–10	Ali-Pasha Umarpashaev (BUL)
Zurab Kapraev (ROU)	10–0	León Peralta (CHI)
Tajmuraz Salkazanov (SVK)	12–2	Marc Dietsche (SUI)
Mahamedkhabib Kadzimahamedau (BLR)	5–1	Arsalan Budazhapov (KGZ)
Mihail Sava (MDA)	9–6	Amit Kumar Dhankar (IND)
Khetag Tsabolov (SRB)	11–0	Néstor Tafur (COL)

Round of 16
Murad Kuramagomedov (HUN)	4
Aimar Andruse (EST)	5
Ayoub Barraj (TUN)	0
Vasyl Mykhailov (UKR)	10
Georgios Kougioumtsidis (GRE)	14
Arman Andreasyan (ARM)	8
Julio Rodríguez (DOM)	4
Mitch Finesilver (ISR)	12
Jorge Llano (ARG)	0
Ali-Pasha Umarpashaev (BUL)	10
Zurab Kapraev (ROU)	0
Tajmuraz Salkazanov (SVK)	10
Mahamedkhabib Kadzimahamedau (BLR)	11
Mihail Sava (MDA)	1
Khetag Tsabolov (SRB)	3
Soner Demirtaş (TUR)	8

Quarterfinals
Aimar Andruse (EST)	0
Vasyl Mykhailov (UKR)	11
Georgios Kougioumtsidis (GRE)	2
Mitch Finesilver (ISR)	9
Ali-Pasha Umarpashaev (BUL)	4
Tajmuraz Salkazanov (SVK)	6
Mahamedkhabib Kadzimahamedau (BLR)	8
Soner Demirtaş (TUR)	4

Semifinals
Vasyl Mykhailov (UKR)	4
Mitch Finesilver (ISR)	2
Tajmuraz Salkazanov (SVK)	4
Mahamedkhabib Kadzimahamedau (BLR)	12

Final
Vasyl Mykhailov (UKR)	2
Mahamedkhabib Kadzimahamedau (BLR)	6

Repechage round 1
Bat-Erdeniin Byambadorj (MGL)	WO
~~Ayoub Barraj (TUN)~~
Arsalan Budazhapov (KGZ)	WO
Mihail Sava (MDA)

Repechage round 2
Bat-Erdeniin Byambadorj (MGL)	5
Aimar Andruse (EST)	6
Arsalan Budazhapov (KGZ)	7
Soner Demirtaş (TUR)	3

Bronze medals
Aimar Andruse (EST)	2
Mitch Finesilver (ISR)	4
Arsalan Budazhapov (KGZ)	2
Tajmuraz Salkazanov (SVK)	5

=== 86 kg ===
6–7 May

Round of 32
Hovhannes Mkhitaryan (ARM)	7–2	Alex Moore (CAN)
Zbigniew Baranowski (POL)	7–2	Noel Torres (MEX)
Domenic Abounader (LBN)	4–4	Mihai Palaghia (ROU)
Taimuraz Friev (ESP)	9–5	Saifedine Alekma (FRA)
Simone Iannattoni (ITA)	0–10	Sosuke Takatani (JPN)
Georgios Savvoulidis (GRE)	2–3	István Veréb (HUN)
~~Bedopassa Buassat (GBS)~~	WO	Bakhodur Kadirov (TJK)
Uri Kalashnikov (ISR)	1–8	Abubakr Abakarov (AZE)
Sandro Aminashvili (GEO)	6–5	Akhmed Magamaev (BUL)
Pedro Ceballos (VEN)	0–10	Azamat Dauletbekov (KAZ)
Ahmed Dudarov (GER)	12–1	Pürevjavyn Önörbat (MGL)
Boris Makoev (SVK)	12–1	Maher Ghanmi (TUN)
Ville Heino (FIN)	12–8	Mukhammed Aliiev (UKR)
Piotr Ianulov (MDA)	5–4	Saiakbai Usupov (KGZ)

Round of 16
Ethan Ramos (PUR)	4
Hovhannes Mkhitaryan (ARM)	6
Zbigniew Baranowski (POL)	10
Domenic Abounader (LBN)	0
Taimuraz Friev (ESP)	4
Sosuke Takatani (JPN)	5
István Veréb (HUN)	6
Bakhodur Kadirov (TJK)	1
Abubakr Abakarov (AZE)	14
Sandro Aminashvili (GEO)	5
Azamat Dauletbekov (KAZ)	5
Ahmed Dudarov (GER)	4
Boris Makoev (SVK)	2
Ville Heino (FIN)	1
Piotr Ianulov (MDA)	3
Yurieski Torreblanca (CUB)	4

Quarterfinals
Hovhannes Mkhitaryan (ARM)	2
Zbigniew Baranowski (POL)	12
Sosuke Takatani (JPN)	12
István Veréb (HUN)	0
Abubakr Abakarov (AZE)	2
Azamat Dauletbekov (KAZ)	2
Boris Makoev (SVK)	4
Yurieski Torreblanca (CUB)	2

Semifinals
Zbigniew Baranowski (POL)	2
Sosuke Takatani (JPN)	7
Abubakr Abakarov (AZE)	4
Boris Makoev (SVK)	4

Final
Sosuke Takatani (JPN)	WO
Boris Makoev (SVK)

Repechage round 1
Simone Iannattoni (ITA)
Taimuraz Friev (ESP)	WO
Maher Ghanmi (TUN)	1
Ville Heino (FIN)	12

Repechage round 2
Taimuraz Friev (ESP)	WO
~~István Veréb (HUN)~~
Ville Heino (FIN)	WO
~~Yurieski Torreblanca (CUB)~~

Bronze medals
Taimuraz Friev (ESP)	1
Zbigniew Baranowski (POL)	5
Ville Heino (FIN)	3
Abubakr Abakarov (AZE)	8

=== 97 kg ===
6–7 May

Round of 32
Seo Min-won (KOR)	0–5 DQ	Chinbatyn Altangerel (MGL)
Samuel Scherrer (SUI)	5–2	Alejandro Cañada (ESP)
Radosław Baran (POL)	3–2	Takeshi Yamaguchi (JPN)

Round of 16
Abraham Conyedo (ITA)	4
Erik Thiele (GER)	1
Ulrich Manouan (CIV)	WO
Gino Ávila (HON)
Akhmed Bataev (BUL)	10
Luis Miguel Pérez (DOM)	0
Evan Ramos (PUR)	2
Satyawart Kadian (IND)	5
Valeriy Andriytsev (UKR)	4
Nicolae Ceban (MDA)	1
Haroon Abid (PAK)	0
Timofei Xenidis (GRE)	11
Chinbatyn Altangerel (MGL)	3
Samuel Scherrer (SUI)	5
Radosław Baran (POL)	6
Albert Saritov (ROU)	9

Quarterfinals
Abraham Conyedo (ITA)	10
Ulrich Manouan (CIV)	0
Akhmed Bataev (BUL)	5
Satyawart Kadian (IND)	5
Valeriy Andriytsev (UKR)	10
Timofei Xenidis (GRE)	0
Samuel Scherrer (SUI)	0
Albert Saritov (ROU)	4

Semifinals
Abraham Conyedo (ITA)	3
Akhmed Bataev (BUL)	2
Valeriy Andriytsev (UKR)	2
Albert Saritov (ROU)	3

Final
Abraham Conyedo (ITA)	WO
Albert Saritov (ROU)

Repechage round 2
Erik Thiele (GER)	11
Ulrich Manouan (CIV)	0
Radosław Baran (POL)	8
Samuel Scherrer (SUI)	1

Bronze medals
Erik Thiele (GER)	WO
Akhmed Bataev (BUL)
Radosław Baran (POL)	5
Valeriy Andriytsev (UKR)	3

=== 125 kg ===
6–7 May

Round of 32
Paris Karepi (ALB)	4–1	Johannes Ludescher (AUT)
Rareș Chintoan (ROU)	10–10	Taiki Yamamoto (JPN)
Rustam Iskandari (TJK)	4–0 Fall	Jere Heino (FIN)
Sumit Malik (IND)	2–2	Aiaal Lazarev (KGZ)

Round of 16
Robert Baran (POL)	10
Kim Dong-hwan (KOR)	0
Sergey Kozyrev (ROC)	12
Georgi Ivanov (BUL)	2
Charles Merrill (PUR)	0
Dániel Ligeti (HUN)	4
Param Pal Singh (AUS)	0
Dilmukhammed Nurmukhamedov (UZB)	10
José Cuba (ESP)	0
Vakhit Galayev (AZE)	10
José Daniel Díaz (VEN)	3
Paris Karepi (ALB)	0
Taiki Yamamoto (JPN)
Rustam Iskandari (TJK)	WO
Sumit Malik (IND)	2
Alexander Romanov (MDA)	2

Quarterfinals
Robert Baran (POL)	1
Sergey Kozyrev (ROC)	7
Dániel Ligeti (HUN)	10
Dilmukhammed Nurmukhamedov (UZB)	0
Vakhit Galayev (AZE)	3
José Daniel Díaz (VEN)	3
Rustam Iskandari (TJK)	5
Sumit Malik (IND)	10

Semifinals
Sergey Kozyrev (ROC)	3
Dániel Ligeti (HUN)	2
José Daniel Díaz (VEN)	0
Sumit Malik (IND)	5

Final
Sergey Kozyrev (ROC)	WO
Sumit Malik (IND)

Repechage round 1
Aiaal Lazarev (KGZ)	4^{F}
Alexander Romanov (MDA)	1

Repechage round 2
Georgi Ivanov (BUL)	0
Robert Baran (POL)	10
Aiaal Lazarev (KGZ)	9^{F}
Rustam Iskandari (TJK)	6

Bronze medals
Robert Baran (POL)	4
Dániel Ligeti (HUN)	0
Aiaal Lazarev (KGZ)	7
José Daniel Díaz (VEN)	5

- Sumit Malik originally qualified for the Olympics, but was later disqualified for doping, giving the spot to Aiaal Lazarev.

== Men's Greco-Roman ==
=== 60 kg ===
8–9 May

Round of 32
Helary Mägisalu (EST)	4–1	Krisztián Kecskeméti (HUN)
~~Fouad Fajari (MAR)~~	WO	Victor Ciobanu (MDA)
Andrés Montaño (ECU)	1–4	Răzvan Arnăut (ROU)
Huang Jui-chi (TPE)	1–5	Michał Tracz (POL)
Justas Petravičius (LTU)	11–0	Mohammad Al-Ajmi (KUW)
Armen Melikyan (ARM)	10–1	Samuel Gurria (MEX)
Murad Mammadov (AZE)	4–1	Stig-André Berge (NOR)
Maksim Kazharski (BLR)	WO	~~Sachin Rana (IND)~~
Chung Han-jae (KOR)	3–2	Ardit Fazljija (SWE)

Round of 16
Ivo Angelov (BUL)	5
Ivan Lizatović (CRO)	0
Adam MacFadyen (CAN)	0
Dato Chkhartishvili (GEO)	8
Joshua Medina (PUR)	0
Firuz Mirzoradzhabov (TJK)	10
Helary Mägisalu (EST)	5
Victor Ciobanu (MDA)	8
Răzvan Arnăut (ROU)	3
Michał Tracz (POL)	1
Justas Petravičius (LTU)	0
Armen Melikyan (ARM)	9
Murad Mammadov (AZE)	3
Maksim Kazharski (BLR)	1
Chung Han-jae (KOR)	8
Dicther Toro (COL)	1

Quarterfinals
Ivo Angelov (BUL)	1
Dato Chkhartishvili (GEO)	2
Firuz Mirzoradzhabov (TJK)	0
Victor Ciobanu (MDA)	14^{C}
Răzvan Arnăut (ROU)	1
Armen Melikyan (ARM)	3
Murad Mammadov (AZE)	1
Chung Han-jae (KOR)	2

Semifinals
Dato Chkhartishvili (GEO)	1
Victor Ciobanu (MDA)	2^{F}
Armen Melikyan (ARM)	5
Chung Han-jae (KOR)	2

Final
Victor Ciobanu (MDA)	WO
Armen Melikyan (ARM)

Repechage round 1
~~Fouad Fajari (MAR)~~
Helary Mägisalu (EST)	WO
~~Samuel Gurria (MEX)~~
Justas Petravičius (LTU)	WO

Repechage round 2
Helary Mägisalu (EST)	9
Firuz Mirzoradzhabov (TJK)	7
Justas Petravičius (LTU)	10
Răzvan Arnăut (ROU)	0

Bronze medals
Helary Mägisalu (EST)	WO
~~Dato Chkhartishvili (GEO)~~
Justas Petravičius (LTU)	1
Chung Han-jae (KOR)	10

=== 67 kg ===
8–9 May

Round of 32
Almat Kebispayev (KAZ)	5–3	Anthony Palencia (VEN)
Leoš Drmola (SVK)	0–8	Gevorg Sahakyan (POL)
Mamadassa Sylla (FRA)	10–0	Cristóbal Torres (CHI)
Daniel Coles (CAN)	3–5	Nilton Soto (PER)
Andreas Vetsch (SUI)	1–3	Parviz Nasibov (UKR)
Deyvid Dimitrov (BUL)	8–5	Elmer Mattila (FIN)
Donior Islamov (MDA)	4–4	Rasul Chunayev (AZE)
Diego Martínez (MEX)	9–0	Aker Al-Obaidi (EOR)
Shogo Takahashi (JPN)	5–1	Marcos Sánchez-Silva (ESP)
Aliaksandr Liavonchyk (BLR)	6–1	Enyer Feliciano (DOM)

Round of 16
Makhmud Bakhshilloev (UZB)	3
Amantur Ismailov (KGZ)	5
Morten Thoresen (NOR)	0
Karen Aslanyan (ARM)	8
Enes Başar (TUR)	0
Almat Kebispayev (KAZ)	5^{F}
Gevorg Sahakyan (POL)	2
Mamadassa Sylla (FRA)	5
Nilton Soto (PER)	1
Parviz Nasibov (UKR)	9
Deyvid Dimitrov (BUL)	0
Rasul Chunayev (AZE)	6
Diego Martínez (MEX)	0
Shogo Takahashi (JPN)	5
Aliaksandr Liavonchyk (BLR)	8
Ashu Bazard (IND)	3

Quarterfinals
Amantur Ismailov (KGZ)	5
Karen Aslanyan (ARM)	10
Almat Kebispayev (KAZ)	2
Mamadassa Sylla (FRA)	5
Parviz Nasibov (UKR)	3
Rasul Chunayev (AZE)	2
Shogo Takahashi (JPN)	2
Aliaksandr Liavonchyk (BLR)	1

Semifinals
Karen Aslanyan (ARM)	3
Mamadassa Sylla (FRA)	1
Parviz Nasibov (UKR)	10
Shogo Takahashi (JPN)	3

Final
Karen Aslanyan (ARM)	WO
Parviz Nasibov (UKR)

Repechage round 1
Andreas Vetsch (SUI)	3
Nilton Soto (PER)	3

Repechage round 2
Morten Thoresen (NOR)	6
Amantur Ismailov (KGZ)	3
Andreas Vetsch (SUI)	WO
~~Rasul Chunayev (AZE)~~

Bronze medals
Morten Thoresen (NOR)	3
Mamadassa Sylla (FRA)	5
Andreas Vetsch (SUI)	WO
~~Shogo Takahashi (JPN)~~

=== 77 kg ===
8–9 May

Round of 32
Matias Lipasti (FIN)	0–4	Viktor Nemeš (SRB)
Evrik Nikoghosyan (FRA)	1–9	Viktar Sasunouski (BLR)
Jair Cuero (COL)	9–3	Dmytro Vasetskyi (UKR)
~~Kim Hyeon-woo (KOR)~~	WO	Rafig Huseynov (AZE)
~~Daler Rezazade (TJK)~~	WO	Gurpreet Singh (IND)
~~Francisco Kadima (ANG)~~	WO	Yuisralembert Carrión (ESP)
Abdelkrim Ouakali (ALG)	5–3	Nicolas Christen (SUI)
Ilie Cojocari (ROU)	7–0	Denis Horváth (SVK)
Bakuri Gogoli (GEO)	2–1	Oldřich Varga (CZE)
Edgar Babayan (POL)	0–9	Georgios Prevolarakis (GRE)
Aik Mnatsakanian (BUL)	3–2	Daniel Cataraga (MDA)
Fatih Cengiz (TUR)	5–0	Per-Anders Kure (NOR)
Jesse Porter (USA)	9–0	Marciano Ali (PUR)
Bakhit Sharif Badr (QAT)	0–8	Riccardo Abbrescia (ITA)

Round of 16
Wuileixis Rivas (VEN)	0
Viktor Nemeš (SRB)	4
Viktar Sasunouski (BLR)	9
Jair Cuero (COL)	6
Rafig Huseynov (AZE)	8
Gurpreet Singh (IND)	0
Yuisralembert Carrión (ESP)	3
Abdelkrim Ouakali (ALG)	3
Ilie Cojocari (ROU)	1
Bakuri Gogoli (GEO)	3
Georgios Prevolarakis (GRE)	5
Aik Mnatsakanian (BUL)	7
Fatih Cengiz (TUR)	7
Jesse Porter (USA)	0
Riccardo Abbrescia (ITA)	3
Paulius Galkinas (LTU)	3

Quarterfinals
Viktor Nemeš (SRB)	2
Viktar Sasunouski (BLR)	0
Rafig Huseynov (AZE)	9
Abdelkrim Ouakali (ALG)	0
Bakuri Gogoli (GEO)	2
Aik Mnatsakanian (BUL)	6
Fatih Cengiz (TUR)	7
Paulius Galkinas (LTU)	1

Semifinals
Viktor Nemeš (SRB)	1
Rafig Huseynov (AZE)	4
Aik Mnatsakanian (BUL)	3
Fatih Cengiz (TUR)	2

Final
Rafig Huseynov (AZE)
Aik Mnatsakanian (BUL)	WO

Repechage round 1
~~Kim Hyeon-woo (KOR)~~
Gurpreet Singh (IND)	WO
~~Daniel Cataraga (MDA)~~
Georgios Prevolarakis (GRE)	WO

Repechage round 2
Gurpreet Singh (IND)	10
Abdelkrim Ouakali (ALG)	1
Georgios Prevolarakis (GRE)	WO
~~Bakuri Gogoli (GEO)~~

Bronze medals
Gurpreet Singh (IND)	4
Viktor Nemeš (SRB)	2
Georgios Prevolarakis (GRE)	WO
~~Fatih Cengiz (TUR)~~

=== 87 kg ===
8–9 May

Round of 32
Alvis Almendra (PAN)	0–8	Masato Sumi (JPN)
Nasser Alizadeh (IRI)	6–0	Ramon Betschart (SUI)
Kim Jin-hyeok (KOR)	0–9	Zurabi Datunashvili (SRB)
Pedro García (ESP)	1–5	Vili Ropponen (FIN)
Carlos Muñoz (COL)	2–11	Mirco Minguzzi (ITA)
~~Arkadiusz Kułynycz (POL)~~	WO	Ivan Huklek (CRO)
Petr Novák (CZE)	5–2	Julius Matuzevičius (LTU)
Lesyan Cousin (JAM)	7–6 Fall	Ariel Alfonso (HON)
Daniel Aleksandrov (BUL)	1–7	Zakarias Berg (SWE)
Artur Shahinyan (ARM)	8–0	Gabriel Lupașco (MDA)
Ioannis Narlidis (CAN)	0–4	Metehan Başar (TUR)

Round of 16
Sunil Kumar (IND)	2
Davit Chakvetadze (ROC)	3
Dimitrios Papadopoulos (GRE)	5
Michael Wagner (AUT)	5
Masato Sumi (JPN)	1
Nasser Alizadeh (IRI)	1
Zurabi Datunashvili (SRB)	9
Vili Ropponen (FIN)	0
Mirco Minguzzi (ITA)	5
Ivan Huklek (CRO)	14
Petr Novák (CZE)	8
Ariel Alfonso (HON)	4
Zakarias Berg (SWE)	1
Artur Shahinyan (ARM)	1
Metehan Başar (TUR)	2
Luis Avendaño (VEN)	1

Quarterfinals
Davit Chakvetadze (ROC)	6
Michael Wagner (AUT)	0
Nasser Alizadeh (IRI)	1
Zurabi Datunashvili (SRB)	1
Ivan Huklek (CRO)	9
Petr Novák (CZE)	0
Zakarias Berg (SWE)	3
Metehan Başar (TUR)	2

Semifinals
Davit Chakvetadze (ROC)	1
Zurabi Datunashvili (SRB)	1
Ivan Huklek (CRO)	4
Zakarias Berg (SWE)	1

Final
Zurabi Datunashvili (SRB)
Ivan Huklek (CRO)	WO

Repechage round 1
~~Kim Jin-hyeok (KOR)~~
Vili Ropponen (FIN)	WO
~~Arkadiusz Kułynycz (POL)~~
Mirco Minguzzi (ITA)	WO

Repechage round 2
Vili Ropponen (FIN)	1
Nasser Alizadeh (IRI)	3
Mirco Minguzzi (ITA)	10
Petr Novák (CZE)	2

Bronze medals
Nasser Alizadeh (IRI)	3
Davit Chakvetadze (ROC)	3
Mirco Minguzzi (ITA)	WO
Zakarias Berg (SWE)

=== 97 kg ===
8–9 May

Round of 32
Vilius Laurinaitis (LTU)	1–1	Aliaksandr Hrabovik (BLR)
Yuta Nara (JPN)	2–1	Olzhas Syrlybay (KAZ)
Thomas Barreiro (CAN)	0–9	Kevin Mejía (HON)
Luillys Pérez (VEN)	2–4	Peter Öhler (GER)
Daniel Gastl (AUT)	1–2	Damian von Euw (SUI)

Round of 16
Nikoloz Kakhelashvili (ITA)	6
Murat Lokyaev (AZE)	4
Kim Seung-jun (KOR)	0
Felix Baldauf (NOR)	9
Jesús Gasca (ESP)	7^{F}
Deepanshu Ahlawat (IND)	3
Laokratis Kesidis (GRE)	0
Alex Szőke (HUN)	9
Vladlen Kozlyuk (UKR)	1
Mélonin Noumonvi (FRA)	5
Vilius Laurinaitis (LTU)	9
Yuta Nara (JPN)	0
Kevin Mejía (HON)	1
Peter Öhler (GER)	4
Damian von Euw (SUI)	1
Artur Omarov (CZE)	1

Quarterfinals
Nikoloz Kakhelashvili (ITA)	2
Felix Baldauf (NOR)	1
Jesús Gasca (ESP)	0
Alex Szőke (HUN)	9
Mélonin Noumonvi (FRA)	4
Vilius Laurinaitis (LTU)	4
Peter Öhler (GER)	2
Artur Omarov (CZE)	3

Semifinals
Nikoloz Kakhelashvili (ITA)	1
Alex Szőke (HUN)	6
Vilius Laurinaitis (LTU)	0
Artur Omarov (CZE)	8

Final
Alex Szőke (HUN)	WO
Artur Omarov (CZE)

Repechage round 2
~~Laokratis Kesidis (GRE)~~
Jesús Gasca (ESP)	WO
Damian von Euw (SUI)	0
Peter Öhler (GER)	4

Bronze medals
Jesús Gasca (ESP)	WO
~~Nikoloz Kakhelashvili (ITA)~~
Peter Öhler (GER)	3
Vilius Laurinaitis (LTU)	5

=== 130 kg ===
8–9 May

Round of 32
Luca Godino (ITA)	0–2	Štěpán David (CZE)
Mykola Kuchmii (UKR)	2–0	David Ovasapyan (ARM)
Ádám Varga (HUN)	2–3	Murat Ramonov (KGZ)

Round of 16
Moisés Pérez (VEN)	2
Arata Sonoda (JPN)	5
Alin Alexuc-Ciurariu (ROU)	1
Alimkhan Syzdykov (KAZ)	1
Beka Kandelaki (AZE)	7
Oskar Marvik (NOR)	0
Rafał Krajewski (POL)	WO
~~Marko Koščević (CRO)~~
Leo Santana (DOM)	0
Radoslav Georgiev (BUL)	8
Alexandros Papadatos (GRE)	0
Elias Kuosmanen (FIN)	9
Štěpán David (CZE)	0
Mykola Kuchmii (UKR)	8
Murat Ramonov (KGZ)	0
Adam Coon (USA)	3^{F}

Quarterfinals
Arata Sonoda (JPN)	1
Alin Alexuc-Ciurariu (ROU)	10
Beka Kandelaki (AZE)	4
Rafał Krajewski (POL)	4^{F}
Radoslav Georgiev (BUL)	1
Elias Kuosmanen (FIN)	1
Mykola Kuchmii (UKR)	6
Adam Coon (USA)	3

Semifinals
Alin Alexuc-Ciurariu (ROU)	5
Rafał Krajewski (POL)	0
Elias Kuosmanen (FIN)	1
Mykola Kuchmii (UKR)	1

Final
Alin Alexuc-Ciurariu (ROU)	WO
Elias Kuosmanen (FIN)

Repechage round 2
Alimkhan Syzdykov (KAZ)	9
Arata Sonoda (JPN)	0
Alexandros Papadatos (GRE)	WO
~~Radoslav Georgiev (BUL)~~

Bronze medals
Alimkhan Syzdykov (KAZ)	4
Rafał Krajewski (POL)	7
Alexandros Papadatos (GRE)	0
Mykola Kuchmii (UKR)	9

== Women's freestyle ==
=== 50 kg ===
7–8 May

Round of 16
Dauletbike Yakhshimuratova (UZB)	2^{F}
Thalía Mallqui (PER)	2
Hsieh Meng-hsuan (TPE)	0
Anna Łukasiak (POL)	9
Seema Bisla (IND)	8
Anastasiya Yanotava (BLR)	0
Jessica MacDonald (CAN)	0
Jonna Malmgren (SWE)	4^{F}
Lucía Yépez (ECU)	10
Mia-Lahnee Aquino (GUM)	0
Lisa Ersel (GER)	0
Julie Sabatié (FRA)	3
~~Debora Ture (GBS)~~
Patricia Bermúdez (ARG)	WO
Mariana Drăguțan (MDA)	7
Kamila Barbosa (BRA)	3

Quarterfinals
Dauletbike Yakhshimuratova (UZB)	0
Anna Łukasiak (POL)	2
Seema Bisla (IND)	10^{F}
Jonna Malmgren (SWE)	2
Lucía Yépez (ECU)	4
Julie Sabatié (FRA)	2
Patricia Bermúdez (ARG)	11
Mariana Drăguțan (MDA)	0

Semifinals
Anna Łukasiak (POL)	1
Seema Bisla (IND)	2
Lucía Yépez (ECU)	6
Patricia Bermúdez (ARG)	6

Final
Seema Bisla (IND)	WO
Lucía Yépez (ECU)

Repechage round 1
Anastasiya Yanotava (BLR)	WO
Jonna Malmgren (SWE)
Mia-Lahnee Aquino (GUM)	2
Julie Sabatié (FRA)	0

Bronze medals
Anastasiya Yanotava (BLR)	2
Anna Łukasiak (POL)	5
Mia-Lahnee Aquino (GUM)	0
Patricia Bermúdez (ARG)	10

=== 53 kg ===
7–8 May

Round of 32
Iryna Chykhradze (UKR)	8–6	Esther Kolawole (NGR)
Iulia Leorda (MDA)	2–4	Olga Khoroshavtseva (ROC)
Annika Wendle (GER)	6–2	Shokhida Akhmedova (UZB)
Mercédesz Dénes (HUN)	0–10	Zeynep Yetgil (TUR)

Round of 16
Luisa Valverde (ECU)	4
Turkan Nasirova (AZE)	1
Andreea Ana (ROU)	7
Laura Peredo (MEX)	0
Samantha Stewart (CAN)	10
Marina Rueda (ESP)	0
Hilary Honorine (FRA)	5
Lin Yung-hsun (TPE)	2
Oh Hyun-young (KOR)	1
Sezen Belberova (BUL)	3
Betzabeth Argüello (VEN)	7
Iryna Chykhradze (UKR)	7
Olga Khoroshavtseva (ROC)	11
Annika Wendle (GER)	0
Zeynep Yetgil (TUR)	5
Jessica Blaszka (NED)	3

Quarterfinals
Luisa Valverde (ECU)	0
Andreea Ana (ROU)	7
Samantha Stewart (CAN)	10
Hilary Honorine (FRA)	0
Sezen Belberova (BUL)	1
Betzabeth Argüello (VEN)	6^{F}
Olga Khoroshavtseva (ROC)	15
Zeynep Yetgil (TUR)	4

Semifinals
Andreea Ana (ROU)	4
Samantha Stewart (CAN)	2
Betzabeth Argüello (VEN)	0
Olga Khoroshavtseva (ROC)	11

Final
Andreea Ana (ROU)	0
Olga Khoroshavtseva (ROC)	6

Repechage round 1
Iulia Leorda (MDA)	6
Annika Wendle (GER)	4

Repechage round 2
Laura Peredo (MEX)	WO
Luisa Valverde (ECU)
Iulia Leorda (MDA)	10
Zeynep Yetgil (TUR)	5

Bronze medals
Laura Peredo (MEX)	0
Samantha Stewart (CAN)	10
Iulia Leorda (MDA)	10
Betzabeth Argüello (VEN)	5

=== 57 kg ===
7–8 May

Round of 32
Betzabeth Sarco (VEN)	0–11	Emese Barka (HUN)
Sevara Eshmuratova (UZB)	14–4	Francesca Indelicato (ITA)
Johanna Lindborg (SWE)	4–2 Fall	Altynay Satylgan (KAZ)
Bediha Gün (TUR)	0–10	Linda Morais (CAN)

Round of 16
Giullia Penalber (BRA)	11
Graciela Sánchez (ESP)	0
Nuraida Anarkulova (KGZ)	7^{F}
Alyona Kolesnik (AZE)	8
Laura Mertens (GER)	0
Mathilde Rivière (FRA)	5
~~Lee Shin-hye (KOR)~~
~~Zineb Hassoune (MAR)~~
Nes Marie Rodríguez (PUR)	0
Veronika Chumikova (ROC)	11
Kateryna Zhydachevska (ROU)	0
Emese Barka (HUN)	2
Sevara Eshmuratova (UZB)	0
Johanna Lindborg (SWE)	5^{F}
Linda Morais (CAN)	2
Grace Bullen (NOR)	12

Quarterfinals
Giullia Penalber (BRA)	16
Nuraida Anarkulova (KGZ)	5
Mathilde Rivière (FRA)
Bye
Veronika Chumikova (ROC)	7
Emese Barka (HUN)	2
Johanna Lindborg (SWE)	0
Grace Bullen (NOR)	10

Semifinals
Giullia Penalber (BRA)	1
Mathilde Rivière (FRA)	5
Veronika Chumikova (ROC)	10^{F}
Grace Bullen (NOR)	12

Final
Mathilde Rivière (FRA)
Veronika Chumikova (ROC)	WO

Repechage round 2
Laura Mertens (GER)
Bye
~~Nes Marie Rodríguez (PUR)~~
Emese Barka (HUN)	WO

Bronze medals
Laura Mertens (GER)	0
Giullia Penalber (BRA)	4
Emese Barka (HUN)	7
Grace Bullen (NOR)	12

=== 62 kg ===
7–8 May

Round of 32
Pai Hsin-ping (TPE)	0–2	Jackeline Rentería (COL)
Elif Jale Yeşilırmak (TUR)	2–2	Kriszta Incze (ROU)
Aina Temirtassova (KAZ)	0–10	Aleksandra Wólczyńska (POL)
Ashley Zárate (PAN)	0–10	Berthe Etane Ngolle (CMR)
Luisa Niemesch (GER)	7–0	Jessica Brouillette (CAN)

Round of 16
Mariana Cherdivara (MDA)	5
Alejandra Romero (MEX)	0
Nabira Esenbaeva (UZB)	0
Veranika Ivanova (BLR)	10
Nathaly Grimán (VEN)	11
Lydia Pérez (ESP)	0
Iva Gerić (CRO)	0
Khürelkhüügiin Bolortuyaa (MGL)	10^{F}
Lyubov Ovcharova (ROC)	WO
Kwon Young-jin (KOR)
Jackeline Rentería (COL)	2
Kriszta Incze (ROU)	6
Aleksandra Wólczyńska (POL)	7
Berthe Etane Ngolle (CMR)	10
Luisa Niemesch (GER)	1
Tetiana Omelchenko (AZE)	1

Quarterfinals
Mariana Cherdivara (MDA)	0
Veranika Ivanova (BLR)	11
Nathaly Grimán (VEN)	6
Khürelkhüügiin Bolortuyaa (MGL)	5^{F}
Lyubov Ovcharova (ROC)	6^{F}
Kriszta Incze (ROU)	0
Berthe Etane Ngolle (CMR)	2
Luisa Niemesch (GER)	2

Semifinals
Veranika Ivanova (BLR)	9
Khürelkhüügiin Bolortuyaa (MGL)	5^{F}
Lyubov Ovcharova (ROC)	8
Luisa Niemesch (GER)	0

Final
Khürelkhüügiin Bolortuyaa (MGL)
Lyubov Ovcharova (ROC)	WO

Repechage round 2
Iva Gerić (CRO)	6
Nathaly Grimán (VEN)	7
Kwon Young-jin (KOR)
Kriszta Incze (ROU)	WO

Bronze medals
Nathaly Grimán (VEN)	6
Veranika Ivanova (BLR)	4
Kriszta Incze (ROU)	0
Luisa Niemesch (GER)	2

=== 68 kg ===
7–8 May

Round of 32
Yessica Oviedo (DOM)	2–4	Buse Tosun (TUR)
Soleymi Caraballo (VEN)	2–14	Irina Rîngaci (MDA)
Adéla Hanzlíčková (CZE)	2–4 Fall	Ámbar Garnica (MEX)
Jeong Eun-sun (KOR)	3–12 Fall	Zsuzsanna Molnár (SVK)

Round of 16
Dalma Caneva (ITA)	6
Yanet Sovero (PER)	1
Zhamila Bakbergenova (KAZ)	8
Anastasiya Zimiankova (BLR)	4
Luz Vázquez (ARG)	4
Svetlana Oknazarova (UZB)	2
Agoro Papavasileiou (GRE)	0
Elis Manolova (AZE)	4
Natalia Strzałka (POL)	1
Nisha Dahiya (IND)	12^{F}
Mimi Hristova (BUL)	5^{F}
Buse Tosun (TUR)	0
Irina Rîngaci (MDA)	2
Adéla Hanzlíčková (CZE)	2^{F}
Zsuzsanna Molnár (SVK)	4
Danutė Domikaitytė (LTU)	6

Quarterfinals
Dalma Caneva (ITA)	0
Zhamila Bakbergenova (KAZ)	10
Luz Vázquez (ARG)	2
Elis Manolova (AZE)	2
Nisha Dahiya (IND)	2
Mimi Hristova (BUL)	12
Adéla Hanzlíčková (CZE)	8
Danutė Domikaitytė (LTU)	0

Semifinals
Zhamila Bakbergenova (KAZ)	3
Elis Manolova (AZE)	5
Mimi Hristova (BUL)	12
Adéla Hanzlíčková (CZE)	2

Final
Elis Manolova (AZE)
Mimi Hristova (BUL)	WO

Repechage round 2
Agoro Papavasileiou (GRE)	WO
Luz Vázquez (ARG)
Buse Tosun (TUR)	5
Nisha Dahiya (IND)	1

Bronze medals
Agoro Papavasileiou (GRE)	0
Zhamila Bakbergenova (KAZ)	10
Buse Tosun (TUR)	6
Adéla Hanzlíčková (CZE)	4^{F}

=== 76 kg ===
7–8 May

Round of 32
María Acosta (VEN)	7–2	Park Su-jin (KOR)
Shakhribonu Ellieva (UZB)	4–5 Fall	Georgina Nelthorpe (GBR)
Tatiana Rentería (COL)	3–1	Pauline Lecarpentier (FRA)
Gozal Zutova (AZE)	2–5	Cătălina Axente (ROU)
Pooja Sihag (IND)	4–5	Kamilė Gaučaitė (LTU)

Round of 16
Yasemin Adar (TUR)	18
Génesis Reasco (ECU)	7
Mariya Oryashkova (BUL)	1
Milaimys Marín (CUB)	14
Amy Youin (CIV)	0
Martina Kuenz (AUT)	11
Zsanett Németh (HUN)	4
Iselin Moen Solheim (NOR)	0
Aikaterini Pitsiava (GRE)	0
Patrycja Sperka (POL)	5
María Acosta (VEN)	7
Georgina Nelthorpe (GBR)	0
Tatiana Rentería (COL)	4
Cătălina Axente (ROU)	2^{F}
Kamilė Gaučaitė (LTU)	0
Alla Belinska (UKR)	4^{F}

Quarterfinals
Yasemin Adar (TUR)	2^{F}
Milaimys Marín (CUB)	0
Martina Kuenz (AUT)	4
Zsanett Németh (HUN)	1
Patrycja Sperka (POL)	2
María Acosta (VEN)	7
Cătălina Axente (ROU)	0
Alla Belinska (UKR)	5

Semifinals
Yasemin Adar (TUR)	10
Martina Kuenz (AUT)	1
María Acosta (VEN)	0
Alla Belinska (UKR)	8

Final
Yasemin Adar (TUR)
Alla Belinska (UKR)	WO

Repechage round 2
~~Génesis Reasco (ECU)~~
Milaimys Marín (CUB)	WO
Kamilė Gaučaitė (LTU)	0
Cătălina Axente (ROU)	6

Bronze medals
Milaimys Marín (CUB)	2
Martina Kuenz (AUT)	2
Cătălina Axente (ROU)	4
María Acosta (VEN)	1

== See also ==
- 2020 Pan American Wrestling Olympic Qualification Tournament
- 2021 European Wrestling Olympic Qualification Tournament
- 2021 African & Oceania Wrestling Olympic Qualification Tournament
- 2021 Asian Wrestling Olympic Qualification Tournament
