= 2026 World Wrestling Championships – Women's freestyle 65 kg =

World Wrestling

Women's freestyle 65 kg at the 2026 World Championships
- Venue: Barys Arena
- Dates: 27–28 October 2026
- Competitors: 24 from 24 nations

Medalists
gold medal	Alina Kasabieva	Russia
silver medal	Irina Rîngaci	Moldova
bronze medal	Feng Yongxin	China
bronze medal	Nana Ikehata	Japan

The women's freestyle 65 kilograms is a competition featured at the 2026 World Wrestling Championships, and was held in Astana, Kazakhstan on 27 and 28 October 2026.

This freestyle wrestling competition consists of a single-elimination tournament, with a repechage used to determine the winner of two bronze medals. The two finalists face off for gold and silver medals. Each wrestler who loses to one of the two finalists moves into the repechage, culminating in a pair of bronze medal matches, featuring the semifinal losers each facing the remaining repechage opponent from their half of the bracket.

== Results ==
Legend

- F — Won by fall

=== Final ===
Final
Alina Kasabieva (RUS)	6
Irina Rîngaci (MDA)	3

=== Top half ===
Round of 32
Feng Yongxin (CHN)	12
Mun Hyon-gyong (PRK)	1
Nabira Esenbaeva (UZB)	5
Lee Han-bit (KOR)	1
Agnes Nygren (SWE)	6^{F}
Dyvonter Odongo (KEN)	0
Aniseta Acosta (ASA)	0
Solomiia Vynnyk (UKR)	10

Round of 16
Alina Kasabieva (RUS)	10
Feng Yongxin (CHN)	0
Nabira Esenbaeva (UZB)	11
Birgul Soltanova (AZE)	9
Elma Zeidlere (LAT)	1
Agnes Nygren (SWE)	2
Solomiia Vynnyk (UKR)	6
Gulnura Tashtanbekova (KGZ)	0

Quarterfinals
Alina Kasabieva (RUS)	10
Nabira Esenbaeva (UZB)	0
Agnes Nygren (SWE)	0
Solomiia Vynnyk (UKR)	13

Semifinals
Alina Kasabieva (RUS)	8
Solomiia Vynnyk (UKR)	4

=== Bottom half ===
Round of 32
Rajnita Jangra (IND)	8
Kateryna Zelenykh (ROU)	6
Ayşe Erkan (TUR)	1
Kayla Miracle (USA)	10^{F}
Sau Tsui Ting (HKG)	0
Beibit Seidualy (KAZ)	10
Lec Hej Marlyne Ande (CAF)	3
Anne Nürnberger (GER)	6^{F}

Round of 16
Irina Rîngaci (MDA)	10
Rajnita Jangra (IND)	0
Kayla Miracle (USA)	1
Nana Ikehata (JPN)	10^{F}
Virginia Jiménez (CHI)	2
Beibit Seidualy (KAZ)	3
Anne Nürnberger (GER)	0
Tüvshinjargalyn Enkhjin (MGL)	4^{F}

Quarterfinals
Irina Rîngaci (MDA)	6^{F}
Nana Ikehata (JPN)	4
Beibit Seidualy (KAZ)	1
Tüvshinjargalyn Enkhjin (MGL)	3

Semifinals
Irina Rîngaci (MDA)	6^{F}
Tüvshinjargalyn Enkhjin (MGL)	2

=== Repechage ===
Repechage round 2
Feng Yongxin (CHN)	10
Nabira Esenbaeva (UZB)	0
Rajnita Jangra (IND)	2
Nana Ikehata (JPN)	6

Bronze medals
Feng Yongxin (CHN)	11
Solomiia Vynnyk (UKR)	0
Nana Ikehata (JPN)	9
Tüvshinjargalyn Enkhjin (MGL)	0

== Final standing ==
Rank	Athlete
1st place, gold medalist(s)	Alina Kasabieva (RUS)
2nd place, silver medalist(s)	Irina Rîngaci (MDA)
3rd place, bronze medalist(s)	Feng Yongxin (CHN)
3rd place, bronze medalist(s)	Nana Ikehata (JPN)
5	Solomiia Vynnyk (UKR)
5	Tüvshinjargalyn Enkhjin (MGL)
7	Agnes Nygren (SWE)
8	Beibit Seidualy (KAZ)
9	Nabira Esenbaeva (UZB)
10	Kayla Miracle (USA)
11	Anne Nürnberger (GER)
12	Rajnita Jangra (IND)
13	Birgul Soltanova (AZE)
14	Kateryna Zelenykh (ROU)
15	Virginia Jiménez (CHI)
16	Elma Zeidlere (LAT)
17	Lee Han-bit (KOR)
18	Mun Hyon-gyong (PRK)
19	Lec Hej Marlyne Ande (CAF)
20	Ayşe Erkan (TUR)
21	Gulnura Tashtanbekova (KGZ)
22	Dyvonter Odongo (KEN)
23	Aniseta Acosta (ASA)
24	Sau Tsui Ting (HKG)
