= 2018 European Wrestling Championships – Women's freestyle 65 kg =

The women's freestyle 65 kg is a competition featured at the 2018 European Wrestling Championships, and was held in Kaspiysk, Russia on May 3 and May 4.

== Medalists ==
Gold	Petra Olli; Finland
Silver	Elis Manolova; Azerbaijan
Bronze	Krystsina Fedarashka; Belarus
Bronze	Henna Johansson; Sweden

== Results ==
Legend

- F — Won by fall

=== Main bracket ===
1/8 finals
Elis Manolova (AZE)	3
Gabriella Sleisz (HUN)	0
Henna Johansson (SWE)	6
Adina Popescu (ROU)	0
Maria Kuznetsova (RUS)	9
Maria Ilchyshyn (UKR)	6

Quarterfinals
Viktoria Bobeva (BUL)	5
Aslı Tuğcu (TUR)	2
Petra Olli (FIN)	9
Krystsina Fedarashka (BLR)	1
Adéla Hanzlíčková (CZE)	1
Elis Manolova (AZE)	4
Henna Johansson (SWE)	3
Maria Kuznetsova (RUS)	0

Semifinals
Viktoria Bobeva (BUL)	0
Petra Olli (FIN)	6
Elis Manolova (AZE)	6
Henna Johansson (SWE)	1

Final
Petra Olli (FIN)	3
Elis Manolova (AZE)	1

=== Repechage ===
Repechage round 1
Gabriella Sleisz (HUN)	8
Adéla Hanzlíčková (CZE)	1

Bronze medal match
Krystsina Fedarashka (BLR)	4^{F}
Viktoria Bobeva (BUL)	1
Gabriella Sleisz (HUN)	0
Henna Johansson (SWE)	5
