= Wrestling at the 2019 European Games – Women's freestyle 62 kg =

Women's freestyle 62kg at the 2019 European Games
- Venue: Minsk Sports Palace
- Date: 27 June and 28 June
- Competitors: 15 from 15 nations

Medalists
gold medal	Yuliya Tkach	Ukraine
silver medal	Elmira Gambarova	Azerbaijan
bronze medal	Maria Kuznetsova	Russia
bronze medal	Kriszta Incze	Romania

The women's freestyle 62 kilograms wrestling competition at the 2019 European Games in Minsk was held on 27 to 28 June 2019 at the Minsk Sports Palace.

== Schedule ==
All times are in FET (UTC+03:00)

Date	Time	Event
Thursday, 27 June 2019	12:20	1/8 finals
Thursday, 27 June 2019	13:40	Quarterfinals
Thursday, 27 June 2019	18:20	Semifinals
Friday, 28 June 2019	11:10	Repechage
Friday, 28 June 2019	19:20	Finals

== Results ==
Legend

- F — Won by fall
- R — Retired

=== Main bracket ===
1/8 finals
Yuliya Tkach (UKR)	6^{F}
Lydia Pérez (ESP)	0
Veranika Ivanova (BLR)	6
Johanna Mattsson (SWE)	6
Gabriella Sleisz (HUN)	0
Taybe Yusein (BUL)	6
Luzie Manzke (GER)	0
Elmira Gambarova (AZE)	4
Katarzyna Mądrowska (POL)	11
Améline Douarre (FRA)	0
Kornelija Zaicevaitė (LTU)	0
Aslı Tuğcu (TUR)	5
Kriszta Incze (ROU)	2
Mariana Cherdivara (MDA)	0

Quarterfinals
Maria Kuznetsova (RUS)	1
Yuliya Tkach (UKR)	6
Johanna Mattsson (SWE)	0
Taybe Yusein (BUL)	4
Elmira Gambarova (AZE)	9
Katarzyna Mądrowska (POL)	0
Aslı Tuğcu (TUR)	2
Kriszta Incze (ROU)	3

Semifinals
Yuliya Tkach (UKR)	11
Taybe Yusein (BUL)	8
Elmira Gambarova (AZE)	4
Kriszta Incze (ROU)	1

Final
Yuliya Tkach (UKR)	4
Elmira Gambarova (AZE)	0

=== Repechage ===
Repechage round 1
Lydia Pérez (ESP)	3
Maria Kuznetsova (RUS)	10
Luzie Manzke (GER)	2^{R}
Katarzyna Mądrowska (POL)	3

Bronze medals
Maria Kuznetsova (RUS)	7
Taybe Yusein (BUL)	4
Katarzyna Mądrowska (POL)	2
Kriszta Incze (ROU)	8
