= 2023 European Wrestling Championships – Women's freestyle 65 kg =

Wrestling competition

Women's freestyle 65 kg at the 2023 European Wrestling Championships
- Venue: Arena Zagreb
- Location: Zagreb, Croatia
- Dates: 20-21 April
- Competitors: 12

Medalists
gold medal	Mimi Hristova	Bulgaria
silver medal	Irina Rîngaci	Moldova
bronze medal	Kriszta Incze	Romania
bronze medal	Tetiana Rizhko	Ukraine

The women's freestyle 65 kg is a competition featured at the 2023 European Wrestling Championships, and will held in Zagreb, Croatia on April 20 and 21.

== Results ==
Legend

- F — Won by fall

Round of 16
Büşra Efe (TUR)	5
Nerea Pampín (ESP)	0
Iva Gerić (CRO)	6
Maša Perović (SRB)	1
Elma Zeidlere (LAT)	0
Natalia Kubaty (POL)	5
Irina Rîngaci (MDA)	10
Kendra Dacher (FRA)	0

Quarterfinals
Mimi Hristova (BUL)	10
Büşra Efe (TUR)	0
Iva Gerić (CRO)	0
Kriszta Incze (ROU)	8^{F}
Tetiana Rizhko (UKR)	4^{F}
Natalia Kubaty (POL)	0
Irina Rîngaci (MDA)	2^{F}
Elis Manolova (AZE)	0

Semifinals
Mimi Hristova (BUL)	2
Kriszta Incze (ROU)	1
Tetiana Rizhko (UKR)	6
Irina Rîngaci (MDA)	13

Final
Mimi Hristova (BUL)	6
Irina Rîngaci (MDA)	4

Repechage round 1
Kendra Dacher (FRA)	4
Elis Manolova (AZE)	3

Bronze medal match
Büşra Efe (TUR)	0
Kriszta Incze (ROU)	9
Kendra Dacher (FRA)	2
Tetiana Rizhko (UKR)	10

== Final standing ==
Rank	Athlete
1st place, gold medalist(s)	Mimi Hristova (BUL)
2nd place, silver medalist(s)	Irina Rîngaci (MDA)
3rd place, bronze medalist(s)	Kriszta Incze (ROU)
3rd place, bronze medalist(s)	Tetiana Rizhko (UKR)
5	Büşra Efe (TUR)
5	Kendra Dacher (FRA)
7	Iva Gerić (CRO)
8	Natalia Kubaty (POL)
9	Elis Manolova (AZE)
10	Maša Perović (SRB)
11	Nerea Pampín (ESP)
12	Elma Zeidlere (LAT)
