= 2024 European Wrestling Championships – Women's freestyle 68 kg =

Wrestling competition

Women's freestyle 68 kg at the 2024 European Wrestling Championships
- Venue: Polyvalent Hall
- Location: Bucharest, Romania
- Dates: 14-15 February
- Competitors: 15

Medalists
gold medal	Buse Tosun Çavuşoğlu	Turkey
silver medal	Tetiana Rizhko	Ukraine
bronze medal	Adéla Hanzlíčková	Czech Republic
bronze medal	Mimi Hristova	Bulgaria

The women's freestyle 68 kg is a competition featured at the 2024 European Wrestling Championships, and held in Bucharest, Romania on February 14 and 15.

== Results ==
Legend

- F — Won by fall

=== Main bracket ===
Round of 16
Khanum Velieva (AIN)	13
Laura Godino (ITA)	1
Hanna Sadchanka (AIN)	11
Nerea Pampín (ESP)	0
Tindra Sjöberg (SWE)	2
Adéla Hanzlíčková (CZE)	10^{F}
Tetiana Rizhko (UKR)	10^{F}
Eyleen Sewina (GER)	0
Albina Drazhi (ALB)	0
Danutė Domikaitytė (LTU)	4^{F}
Larisa Nițu (ROU)	2
Mimi Hristova (BUL)	12
Noémi Szabados (HUN)	0
Koumba Larroque (FRA)	3

Quarterfinals
Buse Tosun Çavuşoğlu (TUR)	4^{F}
Khanum Velieva (AIN)	1
Hanna Sadchanka (AIN)	2
Adéla Hanzlíčková (CZE)	3
Tetiana Rizhko (UKR)	8^{F}
Danutė Domikaitytė (LTU)	0
Mimi Hristova (BUL)	3
Koumba Larroque (FRA)	2

Semifinals
Buse Tosun Çavuşoğlu (TUR)	10
Adéla Hanzlíčková (CZE)	9
Tetiana Rizhko (UKR)	7
Mimi Hristova (BUL)	6

Final
Buse Tosun Çavuşoğlu (TUR)	5
Tetiana Rizhko (UKR)	2

=== Repechage ===
Repechage round 1
Eyleen Sewina (GER)	0
Danutė Domikaitytė (LTU)	4^{F}

Bronze medal match
Khanum Velieva (AIN)	8
Adéla Hanzlíčková (CZE)	8^{F}
Danutė Domikaitytė (LTU)	0
Mimi Hristova (BUL)	6^{F}

== Final standing ==
Rank	Athlete
1st place, gold medalist(s)	Buse Tosun Çavuşoğlu (TUR)
2nd place, silver medalist(s)	Tetiana Rizhko (UKR)
3rd place, bronze medalist(s)	Adéla Hanzlíčková (CZE)
3rd place, bronze medalist(s)	Mimi Hristova (BUL)
5	Khanum Velieva (AIN)
5	Danutė Domikaitytė (LTU)
7	Hanna Sadchanka (AIN)
8	Koumba Larroque (FRA)
9	Larisa Nițu (ROU)
10	Laura Godino (ITA)
11	Tindra Sjöberg (SWE)
12	Noémi Szabados (HUN)
13	Albina Drazhi (ALB)
14	Nerea Pampín (ESP)
15	Eyleen Sewina (GER)
