= Mimi Hristova =

Bulgarian freestyle wrestler (born 1993)

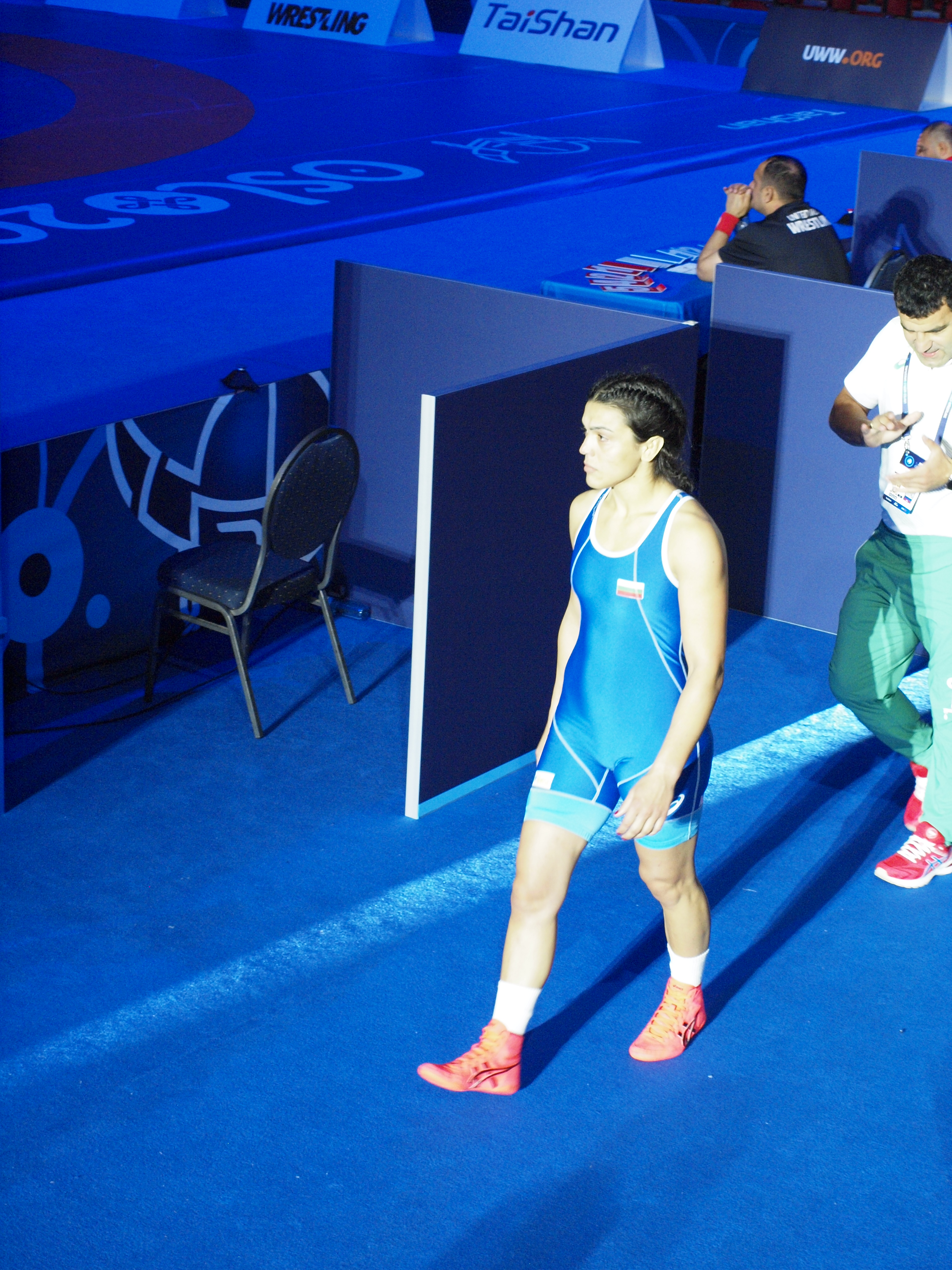
- Hristova at the 2021 World Wrestling Championships in Oslo, Norway

Personal information
- Full name: Mimi Nikolova Hristova
- Born: 19 July 1993 (age 32) Vratsa, Bulgaria
- Height: 163 cm (5 ft 4 in)

Sport
- Country: Bulgaria
- Sport: Freestyle wrestling
- Club: CSKA Sofia
Medal record
World Championships
Bronze medal – third place	2023 Belgrade	65 kg
European Games
Silver medal – second place	2019 Minsk	57 kg
European Championships
Gold medal – first place	2020 Rome	65 kg
Gold medal – first place	2023 Zagreb	65 kg
Silver medal – second place	2018 Kaspiysk	59 kg
Bronze medal – third place	2014 Vantaa	55 kg
Bronze medal – third place	2016 Riga	58 kg
Bronze medal – third place	2024 Bucharest	68 kg
Individual World Cup
Bronze medal – third place	2020 Belgrade	65 kg
Yasar Dogu Tournament
Gold medal – first place	2017 Istanbul	60 kg
Silver medal – second place	2020 Istanbul	57 kg
Silver medal – second place	2021 Istanbul	68 kg
Dan Kolov - Nikola Petrov Tournament
Gold medal – first place	2016 Sofia	58 kg
Gold medal – first place	2017 Ruse	60 kg
Silver medal – second place	2013 Plovdiv	60 kg
Silver medal – second place	2015 Sofia	58 kg
Silver medal – second place	2018 Sofia	59 kg
Silver medal – second place	2021 Plovdiv	68 kg
Silver medal – second place	2023 Sofia	65 kg

Mimi Nikolova Hristova (Bulgarian: Мими Христова, born 19 July 1993) is a Bulgarian freestyle wrestler. She competed in the women's freestyle 58 kg event at the 2016 Summer Olympics, in which she was eliminated in the round of 32 by Pürevdorjiin Orkhon.

== Career ==
In 2020, Hristova won one of the bronze medals in the women's 65 kg event at the 2020 Individual Wrestling World Cup held in Belgrade, Serbia. In 2021, she won the silver medal in the 68 kg event at the Matteo Pellicone Ranking Series 2021 held in Rome, Italy. In May 2021, she qualified at the World Olympic Qualification Tournament to represent Bulgaria at the 2020 Summer Olympics in Tokyo, Japan. She competed in the women's 68 kg event.

Hristova lost her bronze medal match in the women's 65 kg event at the 2022 World Wrestling Championships held in Belgrade, Serbia.

Hristova won the silver medal in the women's 65 kg event at the 2023 Dan Kolov & Nikola Petrov Tournament held in Sofia, Bulgaria. She won one of the bronze medals in the 68 kg event at the 2024 European Wrestling Championships held in Bucharest, Romania. Hristova competed at the 2024 European Wrestling Olympic Qualification Tournament in Baku, Azerbaijan hoping to qualify for the 2024 Summer Olympics in Paris, France. She was eliminated in her second match and she did not qualify for the Olympics. Hristova also competed at the 2024 World Wrestling Olympic Qualification Tournament held in Istanbul, Turkey without qualifying for the Olympics.

== Achievements ==
Year	Tournament	Location	Result	Event
2019	European Games	Minsk, Belarus	2nd	Freestyle 57 kg
2023	World Championships	Belgrade, Serbia	3rd	Freestyle 65 kg
2024	European Championships	Bucharest, Romania	3rd	Freestyle 68 kg

== Personal life and background ==
Mimi Hristova was born in Vratsa, Bulgaria, where she began wrestling at a young age. She trained under the Bulgarian national wrestling program and quickly rose through the junior ranks due to her competitive spirit and technical skill. Off the mat, Hristova is known for her advocacy for women's participation in sports in Bulgaria and often takes part in community events and sports mentorship programs.
