= 2022 European Wrestling Championships =

Wrestling competition held in Budapest, Hungary

2022 European Championships
- Host city: Budapest, Hungary
- Dates: 28 March - 3 April 2022
- Stadium: BOK Sports Hall

Champions
- Freestyle: Azerbaijan
- Greco-Roman: Azerbaijan
- Women: Turkey

The 2022 European Wrestling Championships was held from 28 March to 3 April 2022 in Budapest, Hungary. Belarusian and Russian wrestlers did not compete at the event after a ban as a result of the Russian invasion of Ukraine.

== Competition schedule ==
All times are (UTC+1)

Date	Time	Event
28 March	11.30-15.00	Qualification rounds FS – 57,65,70,79,97 kg
28 March	17.15-17.45	Opening ceremony
28 March	18:00-19.30	Semi-finals: FS – 57,65,70,79,97 kg
29 March	11.30-14.30	Qualification rounds: FS – 61,74,86,92,125 kg; Repechage: FS – 57,65,70,79,97 kg
29 March	16.45-17.45	Semi-finals: FS – 61,74,86,92,125 kg
29 March	18.00-21.00	Finals: FS – 57,65,70,79,97 kg
30 March	11.30-14.00	Qualification rounds: WW – 50,55,59,68,76 kg; Repechage: FS – 61,74,86,92,125 kg
30 March	16.45-17.45	Semi-finals: WW – 50,55,59,68,76 kg
30 March	18.00-21.00	Finals: FS – 61,74,86,92,125 kg
31 March	11.30-14.00	Qualification rounds: WW – 53,57,62,65,72 kg; Repechage: WW – 50,55,59,68,76 kg
31 March	16.45-17.45	Semi-finals: WW – 53,57,62,65,72 kg
31 March	18.00-21.00	Finals: WW – 50,55,59,68,76 kg
1 April	11.30-14.00	Qualification rounds: GR – 55,63,77,87,130 kg; Repechage: WW – 53,57,62,65,72 kg
1 April	16.45-17.45	Semi-finals: GR – 55,63,77,87,130 kg
1 April	18.00-21.00	Finals: WW – 53,57,62,65,72 kg
2 April	11.30-14.00	Qualification rounds: GR – 60,67,72,82,97 kg; Repechage: GR – 55,63,77,87,130 kg
2 April	16.45-17.45	Semi-finals: GR – 60,67,72,82,97 kg
2 April	18.00-21.00	Finals: GR – 55,63,77,87,130 kg
3 April	15.00-16.45	Repechage: GR – 60,67,72,82,97 kg
3 April	17.00-20.00	Finals: GR – 60,67,72,82,97 kg
3 April	21.00	Final banquet

== Medal table ==
* Host nation (Hungary)

Rank	Nation	Gold	Silver	Bronze	Total
1	Turkey	7	3	7	17
2	Azerbaijan	3	6	7	16
3	Georgia	2	4	5	11
4	Bulgaria	2	4	4	10
5	Hungary*	2	2	5	9
6	Armenia	2	1	4	7
6	Ukraine	2	1	4	7
8	Moldova	2	0	3	5
9	Germany	1	1	2	4
9	Romania	1	1	2	4
11	Greece	1	1	0	2
12	Slovakia	1	0	1	2
13	Denmark	1	0	0	1
13	North Macedonia	1	0	0	1
13	San Marino	1	0	0	1
13	Sweden	1	0	0	1
17	Italy	0	2	1	3
18	Poland	0	1	8	9
19	Finland	0	1	1	2
19	France	0	1	1	2
21	Estonia	0	1	0	1
22	Albania	0	0	1	1
22	Austria	0	0	1	1
22	Serbia	0	0	1	1
Totals (24 entries)		30	30	58	118

== Team ranking ==
Rank	Men's freestyle		Men's Greco-Roman		Women's freestyle	
Rank	Team	Points	Team	Points	Team	Points
1	Azerbaijan	159	Azerbaijan	165	Turkey	140
2	Turkey	141	Turkey	150	Ukraine	135
3	Georgia	133	Georgia	114	Bulgaria	110
4	Armenia	88	Hungary	97	Germany	101
5	Poland	84	Armenia	88	Poland	96
6	Hungary	82	Bulgaria	84	Romania	89
7	Bulgaria	70	Ukraine	52	Moldova	86
8	North Macedonia	47	Romania	40	Hungary	62
9	Slovakia	44	Finland	37	Italy	49
10	Moldova	43	Serbia	37	Sweden	43

== Medal summary ==
=== Men's freestyle ===
Event	Gold	Silver	Bronze
57 kg	Vladimir Egorov; North Macedonia	Aliabbas Rzazade; Azerbaijan	Manvel Khndzrtsyan; Armenia
57 kg	Vladimir Egorov; North Macedonia	Aliabbas Rzazade; Azerbaijan	Beka Bujiashvili; Georgia
61 kg	Arsen Harutyunyan; Armenia	Süleyman Atlı; Turkey	Eduard Grigorev; Poland
61 kg	Arsen Harutyunyan; Armenia	Süleyman Atlı; Turkey	Georgi Vangelov; Bulgaria
65 kg	Iszmail Muszukajev; Hungary	Haji Aliyev; Azerbaijan	Münir Recep Aktaş; Turkey
65 kg	Iszmail Muszukajev; Hungary	Haji Aliyev; Azerbaijan	Islam Dudaev; Albania
70 kg	Zurabi Iakobishvili; Georgia	Arman Andreasyan; Armenia	Ramazan Ramazanov; Bulgaria
70 kg	Zurabi Iakobishvili; Georgia	Arman Andreasyan; Armenia	Nicolai Grahmez; Moldova
74 kg	Tajmuraz Salkazanov; Slovakia	Frank Chamizo; Italy	Turan Bayramov; Azerbaijan
74 kg	Tajmuraz Salkazanov; Slovakia	Frank Chamizo; Italy	Giorgi Sulava; Georgia
79 kg	Georgios Kougioumtsidis; Greece	Ashraf Ashirov; Azerbaijan	Vladimeri Gamkrelidze; Georgia
79 kg	Georgios Kougioumtsidis; Greece	Ashraf Ashirov; Azerbaijan	Muhammet Akdeniz; Turkey
86 kg	Myles Amine; San Marino	Abubakr Abakarov; Azerbaijan	Osman Göçen; Turkey
86 kg	Myles Amine; San Marino	Abubakr Abakarov; Azerbaijan	Sebastian Jezierzański; Poland
92 kg	Feyzullah Aktürk; Turkey	Akhmed Bataev; Bulgaria	Osman Nurmagomedov; Azerbaijan
92 kg	Feyzullah Aktürk; Turkey	Akhmed Bataev; Bulgaria	Miriani Maisuradze; Georgia
97 kg	Magomedkhan Magomedov; Azerbaijan	Vladislav Baitcaev; Hungary	Batyrbek Tsakulov; Slovakia
97 kg	Magomedkhan Magomedov; Azerbaijan	Vladislav Baitcaev; Hungary	Zbigniew Baranowski; Poland
125 kg	Taha Akgül; Turkey	Geno Petriashvili; Georgia	Robert Baran; Poland
125 kg	Taha Akgül; Turkey	Geno Petriashvili; Georgia	Dániel Ligeti; Hungary

=== Men's Greco-Roman ===
Event	Gold	Silver	Bronze
55 kg	Eldaniz Azizli; Azerbaijan	Nugzari Tsurtsumia; Georgia	Rudik Mkrtchyan; Armenia
55 kg	Eldaniz Azizli; Azerbaijan	Nugzari Tsurtsumia; Georgia	Emre Mutlu; Turkey
60 kg	Kerem Kamal; Turkey	Edmond Nazaryan; Bulgaria	Murad Mammadov; Azerbaijan
60 kg	Kerem Kamal; Turkey	Edmond Nazaryan; Bulgaria	Gevorg Gharibyan; Armenia
63 kg	Leri Abuladze; Georgia	Taleh Mammadov; Azerbaijan	Oleksandr Hrushyn; Ukraine
63 kg	Leri Abuladze; Georgia	Taleh Mammadov; Azerbaijan	Ahmet Uyar; Turkey
67 kg	Murat Fırat; Turkey	István Váncza; Hungary	Slavik Galstyan; Armenia
67 kg	Murat Fırat; Turkey	István Váncza; Hungary	Hasrat Jafarov; Azerbaijan
72 kg	Róbert Fritsch; Hungary	Shmagi Bolkvadze; Georgia	Ulvu Ganizade; Azerbaijan
72 kg	Róbert Fritsch; Hungary	Shmagi Bolkvadze; Georgia	Ali Arsalan; Serbia
77 kg	Malkhas Amoyan; Armenia	Yunus Emre Başar; Turkey	Sanan Suleymanov; Azerbaijan
77 kg	Malkhas Amoyan; Armenia	Yunus Emre Başar; Turkey	Aik Mnatsakanian; Bulgaria
82 kg	Rafig Huseynov; Azerbaijan	Gela Bolkvadze; Georgia	Burhan Akbudak; Turkey
82 kg	Rafig Huseynov; Azerbaijan	Gela Bolkvadze; Georgia	Tamás Lévai; Hungary
87 kg	Turpal Bisultanov; Denmark	Nicu Ojog; Romania	Islam Abbasov; Azerbaijan
87 kg	Turpal Bisultanov; Denmark	Nicu Ojog; Romania	Robert Kobliashvili; Georgia
97 kg	Kiril Milov; Bulgaria	Arvi Savolainen; Finland	Daniel Gastl; Austria
97 kg	Kiril Milov; Bulgaria	Arvi Savolainen; Finland	Vladlen Kozlyuk; Ukraine
130 kg	Rıza Kayaalp; Turkey	Danila Sotnikov; Italy	Konsta Mäenpää; Finland
130 kg	Rıza Kayaalp; Turkey	Danila Sotnikov; Italy	Dáriusz Vitek; Hungary

=== Women's freestyle ===
Event	Gold	Silver	Bronze
50 kg	Evin Demirhan; Turkey	Miglena Selishka; Bulgaria	Alina Vuc; Romania
50 kg	Evin Demirhan; Turkey	Miglena Selishka; Bulgaria	Anna Łukasiak; Poland
53 kg	Jonna Malmgren; Sweden	Maria Prevolaraki; Greece	Iulia Leorda; Moldova
53 kg	Jonna Malmgren; Sweden	Maria Prevolaraki; Greece	Katarzyna Krawczyk; Poland
55 kg	Andreea Ana; Romania	Oleksandra Khomenets; Ukraine	Bediha Gün; Turkey
55 kg	Andreea Ana; Romania	Oleksandra Khomenets; Ukraine	Mariana Drăguțan; Moldova
57 kg	Alina Hrushyna; Ukraine	Evelina Nikolova; Bulgaria	Tamara Dollák; Hungary
57 kg	Alina Hrushyna; Ukraine	Evelina Nikolova; Bulgaria	Sandra Paruszewski; Germany
59 kg	Anastasia Nichita; Moldova	Jowita Wrzesień; Poland	Elena Brugger; Germany
62 kg	Taybe Yusein; Bulgaria	Luisa Niemesch; Germany	Natalia Kubaty; Poland
62 kg	Taybe Yusein; Bulgaria	Luisa Niemesch; Germany	Ilona Prokopevniuk; Ukraine
65 kg	Tetiana Rizhko; Ukraine	Elis Manolova; Azerbaijan	Kriszta Incze; Romania
68 kg	Irina Rîngaci; Moldova	Pauline Lecarpentier; France	Alla Belinska; Ukraine
68 kg	Irina Rîngaci; Moldova	Pauline Lecarpentier; France	Natalia Strzałka; Poland
72 kg	Anna Schell; Germany	Buse Tosun; Turkey	Kendra Dacher; France
72 kg	Anna Schell; Germany	Buse Tosun; Turkey	Yuliana Yaneva; Bulgaria
76 kg	Yasemin Adar; Turkey	Epp Mäe; Estonia	Enrica Rinaldi; Italy
76 kg	Yasemin Adar; Turkey	Epp Mäe; Estonia	Bernadett Nagy; Hungary

== Participating nations ==
385 competitors from 37 nations participated:

- Albania (5)
- Armenia (14)
- Austria (5)
- Azerbaijan (23)
- Bulgaria (24)
- Croatia (5)
- Czech Republic (5)
- Denmark (2)
- Spain (7)
- Estonia (6)
- Finland (6)
- France (12)
- United Kingdom (3)
- Georgia (20)
- Germany (22)
- Greece (5)
- Hungary (25)
- Israel (7)
- Italy (16)
- Kosovo (1)
- Latvia (3)
- Lithuania (10)
- Moldova (19)
- North Macedonia (5)
- Malta (2)
- Netherlands (3)
- Norway (4)
- Poland (23)
- Portugal (1)
- Romania (17)
- San Marino (2)
- Serbia (12)
- Switzerland (5)
- Slovakia (9)
- Sweden (3)
- Turkey (30)
- Ukraine (20)
