= Krystsina Fedarashka =

Belarusian freestyle wrestler

Personal information
- Born: 16 April 1994 (age 32)
- Height: 170 cm (5 ft 7 in)

Sport
- Country: Belarus
- Sport: Amateur wrestling
- Event: Freestyle
Medal record
Women's freestyle wrestling
Representing Belarus
European Championships
Bronze medal – third place	2018 Kaspiysk	65 kg

Krystsina Fedarashka (born 16 April 1994) is a Belarusian freestyle wrestler. She won one of the bronze medals in the 65 kg event at the 2018 European Wrestling Championships held in Kaspiysk, Russia. In her bronze medal match, she defeated Viktoria Bobeva of Bulgaria.

== Major results ==
Year	Tournament	Location	Result	Event
2018	European Championships	Kaspiysk, Russia	3rd	Freestyle 65 kg
