= Irina Rîngaci =

Moldovan freestyle wrestler (born 2001)

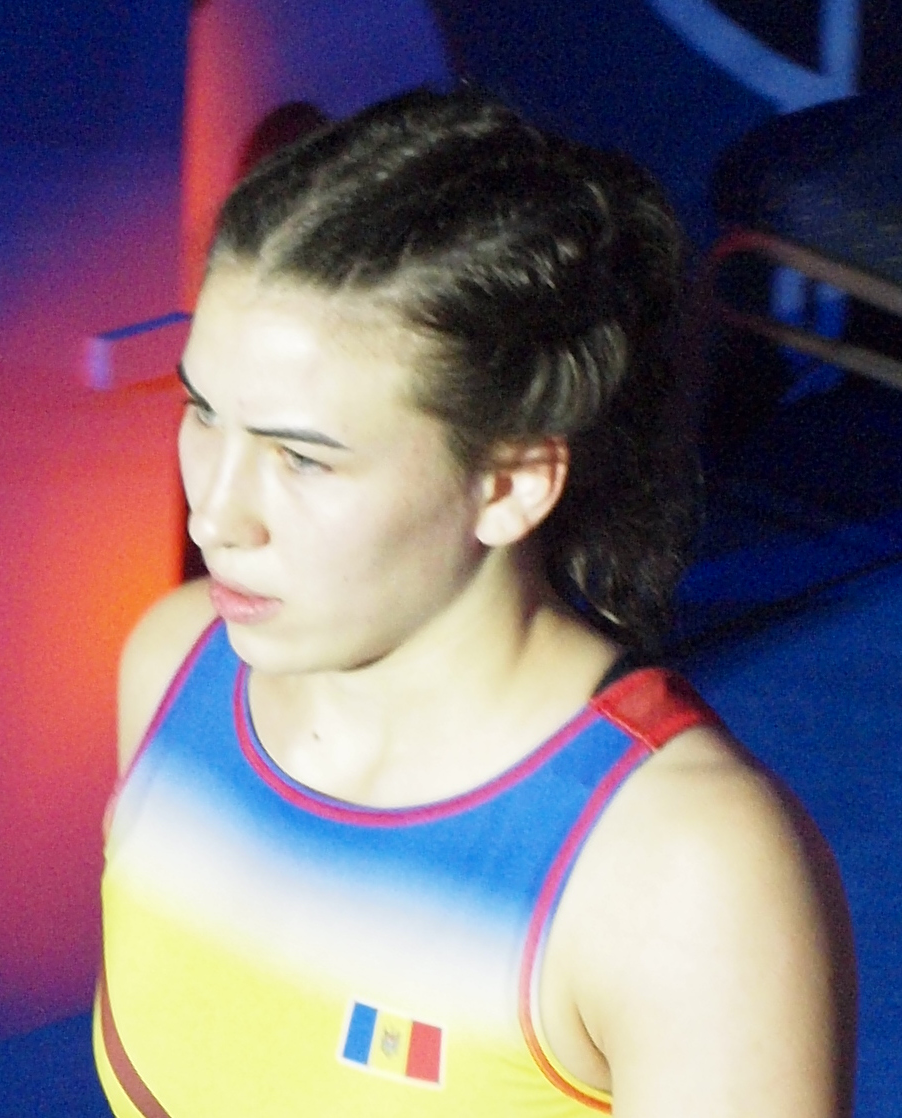
- Rîngaci at the 2021 World Wrestling Championships in Oslo

Personal information
- Born: 23 August 2001 (age 25) Leova, Moldova
- Height: 167 cm (5 ft 6 in) (2024)
- Weight: 68 kg (150 lb) (2024)

Sport
- Country: Moldova
- Sport: Amateur wrestling
- Weight class: 65 kg; 68 kg
- Rank: International master of sports in freestyle wrestling
- Event: Women's freestyle
- Coached by: Petru Chiperi, Andrei Chiperi
Medal record
Women's freestyle wrestling
Representing Moldova
World Championships
Gold medal – first place	2021 Oslo	65 kg
Silver medal – second place	2026 Astana	65 kg
Bronze medal – third place	2022 Belgrade	68 kg
Bronze medal – third place	2023 Belgrade	68 kg
Bronze medal – third place	2025 Zagreb	65 kg
European Championships
Gold medal – first place	2021 Warsaw	65 kg
Gold medal – first place	2022 Budapest	68 kg
Silver medal – second place	2023 Zagreb	65 kg
Silver medal – second place	2025 Bratislava	65 kg
Bronze medal – third place	2024 Bucharest	65 kg
Individual World Cup
Silver medal – second place	2020 Belgrade	65 kg
Dan Kolov & Nikola Petrov Tournament
Gold medal – first place	2022 Veliko Tarnovo	68 kg
Grand Prix
Gold medal – first place	2022 Bucharest	68 kg
Gold medal – first place	2023 Budapest	65 kg
Silver medal – second place	2020 Warsaw	65 kg
Silver medal – second place	2021 Kiev	65 kg
Silver medal – second place	2022 Rome	68 kg
Silver medal – second place	2025 Tirana	65 kg
Silver medal – second place	2025 Budapest	65 kg
Bronze medal – third place	2023 Zagreb	68 kg
World U23 Championships
Gold medal – first place	2023 Tirana	65 kg
Gold medal – first place	2024 Tirana	65 kg
Bronze medal – third place	2019 Budapest	62 kg
Bronze medal – third place	2022 Pontevedra	68 kg
European U23 Championships
Gold medal – first place	2021 Skopje	65 kg
Gold medal – first place	2022 Plovdiv	68 kg
Gold medal – first place	2024 Baku	65 kg
Bronze medal – third place	2023 Bucharest	68 kg
World Juniors Championships
Gold medal – first place	2021 Ufa	65 kg
European Juniors Championships
Silver medal – second place	2019 Pontevedra	62 kg
World Cadets Championships
Bronze medal – third place	2018 Zagreb	57 kg
European Cadets Championships
Silver medal – second place	2018 Skopje	57 kg

Irina Rîngaci (born 23 August 2001) is a Moldovan freestyle wrestler. She won the gold medal in the women's 65 kg event at the 2021 World Wrestling Championships in Oslo, Norway. She is the first female wrestler representing Moldova to win a gold medal at the World Wrestling Championships. Rîngaci is also a five-time medalist, including two gold medals, at the European Wrestling Championships. She represented Moldova at the 2024 Summer Olympics in Paris, France.

== Career ==
Rîngaci finished in 4th place in the girls' 57 kg event at the 2018 Summer Youth Olympics held in Buenos Aires, Argentina. In 2019, she won one of the bronze medals in the 62 kg event at the World U23 Wrestling Championship held in Budapest, Hungary.

Rîngaci won the silver medal in the women's 65 kg event at the 2020 Individual Wrestling World Cup held in Belgrade, Serbia. In March 2021, she competed at the European Qualification Tournament in Budapest, Hungary hoping to qualify for the 2020 Summer Olympics in Tokyo, Japan. In April 2021, Rîngaci won the gold medal in her event at the 2021 European Wrestling Championships in Warsaw, Poland. In May 2021, Rîngaci failed to qualify for the Olympics at the World Olympic Qualification Tournament held in Sofia, Bulgaria. Later that month, she won the gold medal in her event at the European U23 Wrestling Championship held in Skopje, North Macedonia. At the 2021 World Junior Wrestling Championships held in Ufa, Russia, she also won the gold medal in her event.

In 2022, Rîngaci won the gold medal in the women's 68 kg event at the Dan Kolov & Nikola Petrov Tournament held in Veliko Tarnovo, Bulgaria. She also won the gold medal in the 68 kg event at the 2022 European U23 Wrestling Championship held in Plovdiv, Bulgaria. In that same month, Rîngaci won the gold medal in the 68 kg event at the European Wrestling Championships held in Budapest, Hungary. She defeated Pauline Lecarpentier of France in her gold medal match. A few months later, she won the silver medal in her event at the Matteo Pellicone Ranking Series 2022 held in Rome, Italy.

In September 2022, Rîngaci won one of the bronze medals in the 68 kg event at the 2022 World Wrestling Championships held in Belgrade, Serbia. A month later, she also won one of the bronze medals in her event at the 2022 U23 World Wrestling Championships held in Pontevedra, Spain.

Rîngaci won one of the bronze medals in the women's 68 kg event at the 2023 Grand Prix Zagreb Open held in Zagreb, Croatia. She also won one of the bronze medals in her event at the 2023 European U23 Wrestling Championships held in Bucharest, Romania. She won the silver medal in the 65 kg event at the 2023 European Wrestling Championships held in Zagreb, Croatia. In June 2023, Rîngaci lost to Russia's Khanum Velieva at Poddubny wrestling league 5 held in Vladikavkaz, Russia.

Rîngaci won one of the bronze medals in the women's 68 kg event at the 2023 World Wrestling Championships held in Belgrade, Serbia. As a result, she earned a quota place for Moldova for the 2024 Summer Olympics in Paris, France. She defeated Ami Ishii of Japan in her bronze medal match.

Rîngaci won one of the bronze medals in the 65 kg event at the 2024 European Wrestling Championships held in Bucharest, Romania. She defeated Kadriye Aksoy of Turkey in her bronze medal match. At the 2024 Summer Olympics, she competed in the women's 68 kg event. She was eliminated in her first match by Pak Sol-gum of North Korea.

In 2025, Rîngaci won the silver medal in the 65 kg event at the European Wrestling Championships held in Bratislava, Slovakia.

== Achievements ==
Year	Tournament	Location	Result	Event
2021	European Championships	Warsaw, Poland	1st	Freestyle 65 kg
2021	World Championships	Oslo, Norway	1st	Freestyle 65 kg
2022	European Championships	Budapest, Hungary	1st	Freestyle 68 kg
2022	World Championships	Belgrade, Serbia	3rd	Freestyle 68 kg
2023	European Championships	Zagreb, Croatia	2nd	Freestyle 65 kg
2023	World Championships	Belgrade, Serbia	3rd	Freestyle 68 kg
2024	European Championships	Bucharest, Romania	3rd	Freestyle 65 kg
2025	European Championships	Bratislava, Slovakia	2nd	Freestyle 65 kg
2025	World Championships	Zagreb, Croatia	3rd	Freestyle 65 kg
2026	World Championships	Astana, Kazakhstan	2nd	Freestyle 65 kg
