= 2020 Individual Wrestling World Cup =

2020 Individual World Cup
- Host city: Belgrade, Serbia
- Dates: 12–18 December
- Stadium: Štark Arena

Champions
- Freestyle: Russia
- Greco-Roman: Russia
- Women: Russia

The inaugural 2020 Individual World Wrestling Cup was held in Belgrade, Serbia from 12–18 December 2020. It was a replacement event for the 2020 World Championships, which should have taken place in the same location, but since some criteria were not fulfilled, such as not less than 8 top nations from the previous championships to participate, the event is not counted as world championships. The Cup took place amidst the COVID-19 pandemic, which caused this and other problems. The United States for instance chose not to participate.

== Medal table ==
Rank	Nation	Gold	Silver	Bronze	Total
1	Russia	17	2	5	24
2	Kyrgyzstan	3	0	5	8
3	Belarus	2	1	7	10
4	Hungary	1	4	0	5
5	Poland	1	3	3	7
6	Moldova	1	3	2	6
7	Armenia	1	2	2	5
8	Ukraine	1	1	9	11
9	Germany	1	1	2	4
10	Bulgaria	1	0	4	5
11	Greece	1	0	0	1
12	Turkey	0	7	6	13
13	Azerbaijan	0	2	4	6
14	Czech Republic	0	1	1	2
15	India	0	1	0	1
15	Italy	0	1	0	1
15	Latvia	0	1	0	1
18	Serbia	0	0	3	3
19	Iran	0	0	2	2
19	Slovakia	0	0	2	2
21	Algeria	0	0	1	1
21	Argentina	0	0	1	1
21	Switzerland	0	0	1	1
Totals (23 entries)		30	30	60	120

== Team ranking ==
Rank	Men's freestyle		Men's Greco-Roman		Women's freestyle	
Rank	Team	Points	Team	Points	Team	Points
1	Russia	210	Russia	217	Russia	155
2	Turkey	104	Hungary	103	Ukraine	115
3	Azerbaijan	91	Turkey	87	Turkey	113
4	Belarus	86	Kyrgyzstan	85	Germany	108
5	Armenia	76	Belarus	78	Moldova	87
6	Ukraine	79	Armenia	69	Bulgaria	75
7	Poland	73	Azerbaijan	60	Kyrgyzstan	67
8	Moldova	55	Ukraine	60	Belarus	65
9	Kyrgyzstan	46	Serbia	59	Poland	64
10	Hungary	44	Moldova	51	India	58

== Medal summary ==
=== Men's freestyle ===
Event	Gold	Silver	Bronze
57 kg	Zaur Uguev; Russia	Arsen Harutyunyan; Armenia	Andriy Yatsenko; Ukraine
57 kg	Zaur Uguev; Russia	Arsen Harutyunyan; Armenia	Rahman Amouzad; Iran
61 kg	Abasgadzhi Magomedov; Russia	Akhmednabi Gvarzatilov; Azerbaijan	Agustín Destribats; Argentina
61 kg	Abasgadzhi Magomedov; Russia	Akhmednabi Gvarzatilov; Azerbaijan	Georgi Vangelov; Bulgaria
65 kg	Vazgen Tevanyan; Armenia	Iszmail Muszukajev; Hungary	Haji Aliyev; Azerbaijan
65 kg	Vazgen Tevanyan; Armenia	Iszmail Muszukajev; Hungary	Hor Ohannesian; Ukraine
70 kg	Magomedmurad Gadżijew; Poland	Haydar Yavuz; Turkey	Islambek Orozbekov; Kyrgyzstan
70 kg	Magomedmurad Gadżijew; Poland	Haydar Yavuz; Turkey	Arman Andreasyan; Armenia
74 kg	Razambek Zhamalov; Russia	Frank Chamizo; Italy	Tajmuraz Salkazanov; Slovakia
74 kg	Razambek Zhamalov; Russia	Frank Chamizo; Italy	Fazlı Eryılmaz; Turkey
79 kg	Akhmed Usmanov; Russia	Muhammet Nuri Kotanoğlu; Turkey	Mahamedkhabib Kadzimahamedau; Belarus
79 kg	Akhmed Usmanov; Russia	Muhammet Nuri Kotanoğlu; Turkey	Vasyl Mykhailov; Ukraine
86 kg	Dauren Kurugliev; Russia	Zbigniew Baranowski; Poland	Piotr Ianulov; Moldova
86 kg	Dauren Kurugliev; Russia	Zbigniew Baranowski; Poland	Osman Göçen; Turkey
92 kg	Alikhan Zhabrailov; Russia	Georgii Rubaev; Moldova	Samuel Scherrer; Switzerland
92 kg	Alikhan Zhabrailov; Russia	Georgii Rubaev; Moldova	Erhan Yaylacı; Turkey
97 kg	Abdulrashid Sadulaev; Russia	Aliaksandr Hushtyn; Belarus	Akhmed Bataev; Bulgaria
97 kg	Abdulrashid Sadulaev; Russia	Aliaksandr Hushtyn; Belarus	Süleyman Karadeniz; Turkey
125 kg	Shamil Sharipov; Russia	Robert Baran; Poland	Dzianis Khramiankou; Belarus
125 kg	Shamil Sharipov; Russia	Robert Baran; Poland	Aiaal Lazarev; Kyrgyzstan

=== Men's Greco-Roman ===
Event	Gold	Silver	Bronze
55 kg	Emin Sefershaev; Russia	Şerif Kılıç; Turkey	Abdelkarim Fergat; Algeria
55 kg	Emin Sefershaev; Russia	Şerif Kılıç; Turkey	Eldaniz Azizli; Azerbaijan
60 kg	Zholaman Sharshenbekov; Kyrgyzstan	Stepan Maryanyan; Russia	Maksim Kazharski; Belarus
60 kg	Zholaman Sharshenbekov; Kyrgyzstan	Stepan Maryanyan; Russia	Kristijan Fris; Serbia
63 kg	Zhambolat Lokyaev; Russia	Erik Torba; Hungary	Soslan Daurov; Belarus
63 kg	Zhambolat Lokyaev; Russia	Erik Torba; Hungary	Kaly Sulaimanov; Kyrgyzstan
67 kg	Nazir Abdullaev; Russia	Islambek Dadov; Azerbaijan	Roman Pacurkowski; Poland
67 kg	Nazir Abdullaev; Russia	Islambek Dadov; Azerbaijan	Slavik Galstyan; Armenia
72 kg	Bálint Korpási; Hungary	Malkhas Amoyan; Armenia	Ruslan Tsarev; Kyrgyzstan
72 kg	Bálint Korpási; Hungary	Malkhas Amoyan; Armenia	Cengiz Arslan; Turkey
77 kg	Roman Vlasov; Russia	Zoltán Lévai; Hungary	Alexandrin Guțu; Moldova
77 kg	Roman Vlasov; Russia	Zoltán Lévai; Hungary	Viktor Nemeš; Serbia
82 kg	Milad Alirzaev; Russia	Salih Aydın; Turkey	Radzik Kuliyeu; Belarus
82 kg	Milad Alirzaev; Russia	Salih Aydın; Turkey	Roland Schwarz; Germany
87 kg	Kiryl Maskevich; Belarus	Davit Chakvetadze; Russia	Zurabi Datunashvili; Serbia
87 kg	Kiryl Maskevich; Belarus	Davit Chakvetadze; Russia	Semen Novikov; Ukraine
97 kg	Musa Evloev; Russia	Alex Szőke; Hungary	Artur Omarov; Czech Republic
97 kg	Musa Evloev; Russia	Alex Szőke; Hungary	Mohammad Hadi Saravi; Iran
130 kg	Sergey Semenov; Russia	Osman Yıldırım; Turkey	Mykola Kuchmii; Ukraine
130 kg	Sergey Semenov; Russia	Osman Yıldırım; Turkey	Beka Kandelaki; Azerbaijan

=== Women's freestyle ===
Event	Gold	Silver	Bronze
50 kg	Ekaterina Poleshchuk; Russia	Liliia Malanchuk; Ukraine	Lisa Ersel; Germany
50 kg	Ekaterina Poleshchuk; Russia	Liliia Malanchuk; Ukraine	Miglena Selishka; Bulgaria
53 kg	Maria Prevolaraki; Greece	Roksana Zasina; Poland	Zalina Sidakova; Belarus
53 kg	Maria Prevolaraki; Greece	Roksana Zasina; Poland	Anzhelika Vetoshkina; Russia
55 kg	Iryna Kurachkina; Belarus	Annika Wendle; Germany	Olga Khoroshavtseva; Russia
55 kg	Iryna Kurachkina; Belarus	Annika Wendle; Germany	Katarzyna Krawczyk; Poland
57 kg	Anastasia Nichita; Moldova	Anshu Malik; India	Mehlika Öztürk; Turkey
57 kg	Anastasia Nichita; Moldova	Anshu Malik; India	Veronika Chumikova; Russia
59 kg	Svetlana Lipatova; Russia	Mariana Cherdivara; Moldova	Magdalena Głodek; Poland
59 kg	Svetlana Lipatova; Russia	Mariana Cherdivara; Moldova	Kateryna Zelenykh; Ukraine
62 kg	Aisuluu Tynybekova; Kyrgyzstan	Anastasija Grigorjeva; Latvia	Ilona Prokopevniuk; Ukraine
62 kg	Aisuluu Tynybekova; Kyrgyzstan	Anastasija Grigorjeva; Latvia	Lyubov Ovcharova; Russia
65 kg	Tetiana Rizhko; Ukraine	Irina Rîngaci; Moldova	Mimi Hristova; Bulgaria
65 kg	Tetiana Rizhko; Ukraine	Irina Rîngaci; Moldova	Elis Manolova; Azerbaijan
68 kg	Meerim Zhumanazarova; Kyrgyzstan	Adéla Hanzlíčková; Czech Republic	Alina Berezhna; Ukraine
68 kg	Meerim Zhumanazarova; Kyrgyzstan	Adéla Hanzlíčková; Czech Republic	Khanum Velieva; Russia
72 kg	Yuliana Yaneva; Bulgaria	Buse Tosun; Turkey	Zsuzsanna Molnár; Slovakia
72 kg	Yuliana Yaneva; Bulgaria	Buse Tosun; Turkey	Alla Belinska; Ukraine
76 kg	Aline Rotter-Focken; Germany	Yasemin Adar; Turkey	Aiperi Medet Kyzy; Kyrgyzstan
76 kg	Aline Rotter-Focken; Germany	Yasemin Adar; Turkey	Vasilisa Marzaliuk; Belarus

== Participating nations ==
455 wrestlers from 48 countries:

1. Albania (4)
2. Algeria (10)
3. Argentina (3)
4. Armenia (18)
5. Azerbaijan (20)
6. Belgium (1)
7. Belarus (19)
8. Bahrain (1)
9. Bulgaria (24)
10. Canada (2)
11. Chile (3)
12. Cameroon (2)
13. Croatia (2)
14. Czech Republic (5)
15. Spain (8)
16. Estonia (4)
17. France (14)
18. United Kingdom (1)
19. Guinea-Bissau (5)
20. Germany (21)
21. Greece (6)
22. Guinea (2)
23. Hungary (16)
24. India (24)
25. Iran (3)
26. Israel (5)
27. Italy (14)
28. Kyrgyzstan (20)
29. Kuwait (2)
30. Latvia (3)
31. Morocco (3)
32. Moldova (22)
33. North Macedonia (1)
34. Panama (3)
35. Peru (7)
36. Poland (17)
37. Portugal (2)
38. Romania (16)
39. Russia (30)
40. Serbia (13) (Host)
41. Switzerland (5)
42. Slovakia (7)
43. Tajikistan (2)
44. Tunisia (2)
45. Turkey (30)
46. Ukraine (30)
47. Uzbekistan (1)
48. Yemen (2)
