= 2017 World Wrestling Championships – Women's freestyle 63 kg =

Women's freestyle 63 kg at the 2017 World Championships
- Venue: AccorHotels Arena
- Dates: 23 August 2017
- Competitors: 23 from 23 nations

Medalists
gold medal	Pürevdorjiin Orkhon	Mongolia
silver medal	Yuliya Tkach	Ukraine
bronze medal	Valeria Lazinskaya	Russia
bronze medal	Jackeline Rentería	Colombia

The women's freestyle 63 kilograms is a competition featured at the 2017 World Wrestling Championships, and was held in Paris, France on 23 August 2017.

This freestyle wrestling competition consisted of a single-elimination tournament, with a repechage used to determine the winners of two bronze medals.

== Results ==
Legend

- F — Won by fall
- R — Retired

=== Final ===
Final
Yuliya Tkach (UKR)	3
Pürevdorjiin Orkhon (MGL)	6

=== Top half ===
Round of 32

Round of 16
Yuliya Tkach (UKR)	10
Ilana Kratysh (ISR)	0
Natalia Kubaty (POL)	0
Valeria Lazinskaya (RUS)	8
Hafize Şahin (TUR)	4^{F}
Braxton Stone-Papadopoulos (CAN)	4
Laëtitia Blot (FRA)	2
Laís Nunes (BRA)	12

Quarterfinals
Yuliya Tkach (UKR)	5
Valeria Lazinskaya (RUS)	0
Hafize Şahin (TUR)	9
Laís Nunes (BRA)	6

Semifinals
Yuliya Tkach (UKR)	13
Hafize Şahin (TUR)	5

=== Bottom half ===
Round of 32
Mallory Velte (USA)	2
Blessing Oborududu (NGR)	10
Taybe Yusein (BUL)	10
Zarina Kunangarayeva (KAZ)	0
Jang Eun-sil (KOR)	0
Henna Johansson (SWE)	8
Shilpi Sheoran (IND)	0
Pürevdorjiin Orkhon (MGL)	10
Veranika Ivanova (BLR)	11
Yanet Sovero (PER)	1
Jackeline Rentería (COL)	12
Adéla Hanzlíčková (CZE)	5
Tayla Ford (NZL)	0
Elmira Gambarova (AZE)	5

Round of 16
Blessing Oborududu (NGR)	12
Taybe Yusein (BUL)	6
Henna Johansson (SWE)	2
Pürevdorjiin Orkhon (MGL)	6
Veranika Ivanova (BLR)	9
Jackeline Rentería (COL)	12
Elmira Gambarova (AZE)	2
Yukako Kawai (JPN)	8^{F}

Quarterfinals
Blessing Oborududu (NGR)	2
Pürevdorjiin Orkhon (MGL)	10^{F}
Jackeline Rentería (COL)	2^{F}
Yukako Kawai (JPN)	0

Semifinals
Pürevdorjiin Orkhon (MGL)	13
Jackeline Rentería (COL)	0

=== Repechage ===
Repechage round 1
Shilpi Sheoran (IND)	0
Henna Johansson (SWE)	4^{F}

Repechage round 2
Ilana Kratysh (ISR)	4
Valeria Lazinskaya (RUS)	14^{F}
Henna Johansson (SWE)	3
Blessing Oborududu (NGR)	11

Bronze medals
Valeria Lazinskaya (RUS)	6
Hafize Şahin (TUR)	2^{R}
Blessing Oborududu (NGR)	7
Jackeline Rentería (COL)	8
