= 2019 European Wrestling Championships – Women's freestyle 59 kg =

The women's freestyle 59 kg is a competition featured at the 2019 European Wrestling Championships, and was held in Bucharest, Romania on April 10 and April 11.

== Medalists ==
Gold	Bilyana Dudova; Bulgaria
Silver	Svetlana Lipatova; Russia
Bronze	Elmira Gambarova; Azerbaijan
Bronze	Elif Jale Yeşilırmak; Turkey

== Results ==
Legend

- F — Won by fall

=== Main Bracket ===
1/8 finals
Kateryna Zhydachevska (ROU)	6
Carola Rainero (ITA)	5^{F}
Teona Jandagashvili (GEO)	0
Ramóna Galambos (HUN)	10^{F}
Bilyana Dudova (BUL)	8
Katsiaryna Hanchar (BLR)	0

Quarterfinals
Svetlana Lipatova (RUS)	4
Elmira Gambarova (AZE)	2
Anhelina Lysak (UKR)	11
Sandra Paruszewski (GER)	0
Elif Jale Yeşilırmak (TUR)	10
Carola Rainero (ITA)	0
Ramóna Galambos (HUN)	0
Bilyana Dudova (BUL)	4

Semifinals
Svetlana Lipatova (RUS)	6
Anhelina Lysak (UKR)	5
Elif Jale Yeşilırmak (TUR)	0
Bilyana Dudova (BUL)	2

Final
Svetlana Lipatova (RUS)	0
Bilyana Dudova (BUL)	3

=== Repechage ===
Repechage round 1
Katsiaryna Hanchar (BLR)	4
Ramóna Galambos (HUN)	11^{F}

Bronze medal match
Elmira Gambarova (AZE)	11
Anhelina Lysak (UKR)	6
Ramóna Galambos (HUN)	1
Elif Jale Yeşilırmak (TUR)	5
