= 2016 European Wrestling Championships – Women's freestyle 63 kg =

The women's freestyle 63 kg competition at the 2016 European Wrestling Championships was held in Riga, Latvia, on March 8.

== Medalists ==
Gold	Anastasija Grigorjeva; Latvia
Silver	Yuliya Tkach; Ukraine
Bronze	Inna Trazhukova; Russia
Bronze	Marianna Sastin; Hungary

== Results ==
Legend

- F — Won by fall

Qualification
Madzina Sidakova (BLR)	8
Chloe Anteda Spiteri (GBR)	0
Agoro Papavasileiou (GRE)	0
Hafize Sahin (TUR)	6
Marianna Sastin (HUN)	12
Taybe Mustafa Yusein (BUL)	2
Nadine Weinauge (GER)	12
Adela Hanzlickova (CZE)	2
Kriszta Incze (ROU)	2
Anastasija Grigorjeva (LAT)	11

Quarterfinals
Yuliya Tkach (UKR)	4^{F}
Indre Bubelyte (LTU)	0
Inna Trazhukova (RUS)	10
Madzina Sidakova (BLR)	0
Hafize Sahin (TUR)	4
Marianna Sastin (HUN)	15
Nadine Weinauge (GER)	0
Anastasija Grigorjeva (LAT)	11

Semifinals
Yuliya Tkach (UKR)	9
Inna Trazhukova (RUS)	5
Marianna Sastin (HUN)	0
Anastasija Grigorjeva (LAT)	10

Final
Yuliya Tkach (UKR)	3
Anastasija Grigorjeva (LAT)	3

=== Repechage ===
Repechage round 1
Kriszta Incze (ROU)	0
Nadine Weinauge (GER)	6^{F}

Bronze medals
Nadine Weinauge (GER)	0
Marianna Sastin (HUN)	10
Indre Bubelyte (LTU)	0
Inna Trazhukova (RUS)	10
