= 2014 European Wrestling Championships – Women's freestyle 60 kg =

Wrestling competitions

The women's freestyle 60 kg is a competition featured at the 2014 European Wrestling Championships, and was held in Vantaa, Finland on 1 April 2014.

== Medalists ==
Gold	Johanna Mattsson; Sweden
Silver	Hafize Şahin; Turkey
Bronze	Olga Butkevych; Great Britain
Bronze	Taybe Yusein; Bulgaria

== Results ==
Legend

- F — Won by fall

=== Bracket ===
Round of 16
Oksana Herhel (UKR)	2
Taybe Yusein (BUL)	13
Ramóna Galambos (HUN)	2
Yuliya Ratkevich (AZE)	6

Quarterfinals
Georgiana Filip (ROU)	2
Olga Butkevych (GBR)	4^{F}
Hafize Şahin (TUR)	4^{F}
Nadzeya Mikhalkova (BLR)	0
Svetlana Lipatova (RUS)	3
Johanna Mattsson (SWE)	8
Taybe Yusein (BUL)	8
Yuliya Ratkevich (AZE)	4

Semifinals
Olga Butkevych (GBR)	14
Hafize Şahin (TUR)	15
Johanna Mattsson (SWE)	7
Taybe Yusein (BUL)	0

Final
Hafize Şahin (TUR)	0
Johanna Mattsson (SWE)	4^{F}

=== Repechage ===
Bronze medal match
Nadzeya Mikhalkova (BLR)	0
Olga Butkevych (GBR)	2^{F}
Svetlana Lipatova (RUS)	2
Taybe Yusein (BUL)	12^{F}
