= 2020 European Wrestling Championships – Women's freestyle 62 kg =

Competition at the 2020 European Wrestling Championships

The women's freestyle 62 kg is a competition featured at the 2020 European Wrestling Championships, and was held in Rome, Italy on February 13 and February 14.

== Medalists ==
Gold	Yuliya Tkach; Ukraine
Silver	Inna Trazhukova; Russia
Bronze	Tetiana Omelchenko; Azerbaijan
Bronze	Taybe Yusein; Bulgaria

== Results ==
Legend

- F — Won by fall

=== Main Bracket ===
1/8 finals
Aurora Campagna (ITA)	0
Tetiana Omelchenko (AZE)	3
Lydia Pérez (ESP)	14
Kornelija Zaicevaitė (LTU)	3
Inna Trazhukova (RUS)	6
Mariana Cherdivara (MDA)	5
Taybe Yusein (BUL)	9
Elif Jale Yeşilırmak (TUR)	6
Katarzyna Mądrowska (POL)	1
Luisa Niemesch (GER)	3

Quarterfinals
Veranika Ivanova (BLR)	2
Yuliya Tkach (UKR)	12
Marianna Sastin (HUN)	3
Tetiana Omelchenko (AZE)	5
Lydia Pérez (ESP)	0
Inna Trazhukova (RUS)	6^{F}
Taybe Yusein (BUL)	10
Luisa Niemesch (GER)	0

Semifinals
Yuliya Tkach (UKR)	4
Tetiana Omelchenko (AZE)	0
Inna Trazhukova (RUS)	7
Taybe Yusein (BUL)	4

Final
Yuliya Tkach (UKR)	2
Inna Trazhukova (RUS)	1

=== Repechage ===
Repechage round 1
Mariana Cherdivara (MDA)	7^{F}
Lydia Pérez (ESP)	0

Bronze medal match
Veranika Ivanova (BLR)	0
Tetiana Omelchenko (AZE)	4
Mariana Cherdivara (MDA)	0
Taybe Yusein (BUL)	12

== Final standing ==
Rank	Athlete
1st place, gold medalist(s)	Yuliya Tkach (UKR)
2nd place, silver medalist(s)	Inna Trazhukova (RUS)
3rd place, bronze medalist(s)	Tetiana Omelchenko (AZE)
3rd place, bronze medalist(s)	Taybe Yusein (BUL)
5	Veranika Ivanova (BLR)
5	Mariana Cherdivara (MDA)
7	Lydia Pérez (ESP)
8	Luisa Niemesch (GER)
9	Elif Jale Yeşilırmak (TUR)
10	Marianna Sastin (HUN)
11	Kornelija Zaicevaitė (LTU)
12	Katarzyna Mądrowska (POL)
13	Aurora Campagna (ITA)
