= 2026 European Wrestling Championships – Women's freestyle 62 kg =

Wrestling competition held in Tirana, Albania

Women's freestyle 62 kg at the 2026 European Wrestling Championships
- Venue: Tirana Olympic Park
- Location: Tirana, Albania
- Dates: 23–24 April
- Competitors: 14 from 12 nations

Medalists
| gold medal | Grace Bullen | Norway |
| silver medal | Amina Tandelova |
| bronze medal | Naemi Leistner | Germany |
| bronze medal | Bilyana Dudova | Bulgaria |

The women's freestyle 62 kilograms competition at the 2026 European Wrestling Championships was held from 23 to 24 April 2026 at the Tirana Olympic Park in Tirana, Albania.

== Results ==
Legend

- F — Won by fall

=== Main bracket ===
Round of 16
Ruzanna Mammadova (AZE) | 10
Ilona Prokopevniuk (UKR) | 0
Sevim Akbaş (TUR) | 0
Enikő Elekes (HUN) | 8^{F}
Naemi Leistner (GER) | 8^{F}
Alicja Nowosad (POL) | 1
Johanna Lindborg (SWE) | 10
Amina Capezan (ROU) | 0
Viktoria Vesso (EST) | 4
Veranika Ivanova (UWW) | 7
Améline Douarre (FRA) | 0
Grace Bullen (NOR) | 10

Quarterfinals
Amina Tandelova (UWW) | 5
Ruzanna Mammadova (AZE) | 0
Enikő Elekes (HUN) | 0
Naemi Leistner (GER) | 3^{F}
Johanna Lindborg (SWE) | 10^{F}
Veranika Ivanova (UWW) | 0
Grace Bullen (NOR) | 11
Bilyana Dudova (BUL) | 0

Semifinals
Amina Tandelova (UWW) | 9
Naemi Leistner (GER) | 0
Johanna Lindborg (SWE) | 6
Grace Bullen (NOR) | 7

Final
Amina Tandelova (UWW) | 9
Grace Bullen (NOR) | 5^{F}

=== Repechage ===
Repechage round 1
Améline Douarre (FRA) | 0
Bilyana Dudova (BUL) | 4

Bronze medal matches
Ruzanna Mammadova (AZE) | 2
Naemi Leistner (GER) | 5
Bilyana Dudova (BUL) | 3
Johanna Lindborg (SWE) | 1

== Final standing ==
| Rank | Wrestler |
|---|---|
| 1st place, gold medalist(s) | Grace Bullen (NOR) |
| 2nd place, silver medalist(s) | Amina Tandelova (UWW) |
| 3rd place, bronze medalist(s) | Naemi Leistner (GER) |
| 3rd place, bronze medalist(s) | Bilyana Dudova (BUL) |
| 5 | Ruzanna Mammadova (AZE) |
| 5 | Johanna Lindborg (SWE) |
| 7 | Enikő Elekes (HUN) |
| 8 | Veranika Ivanova (UWW) |
| 9 | Viktoria Vesso (EST) |
| 10 | Alicja Nowosad (POL) |
| 11 | Sevim Akbaş (TUR) |
| 12 | Ilona Prokopevniuk (UKR) |
| 13 | Amina Capezan (ROU) |
| 14 | Améline Douarre (FRA) |
