= 2012 World Junior Wrestling Championships =

Junior Wrestling Championships

- Host city: Pattaya, Thailand
- Dates: 4-9 September 2012

Champions
- Freestyle: Russia
- Greco-Roman: Azerbaijan
- Women: Japan

The 2012 World Junior Wrestling Championships were the 36th edition of the World Junior Wrestling Championships and were held in Pattaya, Thailand between 4-9 September 2012.

== Medal table ==
Rank	Nation	Gold	Silver	Bronze	Total
1	Russia	5	5	2	12
2	Japan	4	0	3	7
3	Azerbaijan	3	2	2	7
4	Iran	3	1	3	7
5	Belarus	2	0	2	4
6	Mongolia	2	0	1	3
7	Turkey	1	2	5	8
8	China	1	1	4	6
9	Hungary	1	0	1	2
10	Canada	1	0	0	1
10	Lithuania	1	0	0	1
12	Georgia	0	4	3	7
13	Ukraine	0	3	2	5
14	Germany	0	2	1	3
15	United States	0	1	3	4
16	France	0	1	1	2
16	Moldova	0	1	1	2
18	Vietnam	0	1	0	1
19	Armenia	0	0	3	3
19	Kazakhstan	0	0	3	3
21	India	0	0	2	2
22	Bulgaria	0	0	1	1
22	Croatia	0	0	1	1
22	Finland	0	0	1	1
22	Mexico	0	0	1	1
22	Norway	0	0	1	1
22	Poland	0	0	1	1
Totals (27 entries)		24	24	48	96

== Medal summary ==
=== Men's freestyle ===
Event	Gold	Silver	Bronze
50 kg	Magomed Magomedaliev; Russia	Ruslan Surkhaev; Azerbaijan	Pardeep Narwal; India
50 kg	Magomed Magomedaliev; Russia	Ruslan Surkhaev; Azerbaijan	Alireza Hatami; Iran
55 kg	Erdenebatyn Bekhbayar; Mongolia	Lasha Talakhadze; Georgia	Fumitaka Morishita; Japan
55 kg	Erdenebatyn Bekhbayar; Mongolia	Lasha Talakhadze; Georgia	Manuel Wolfer; Germany
60 kg	Behnam Ehsanpour; Iran	Zayirbeg Muzarov; Russia	Meizhan Ashirov; Kazakhstan
60 kg	Behnam Ehsanpour; Iran	Zayirbeg Muzarov; Russia	Valodya Frangulyan; Armenia
66 kg	Magomed Kurbanaliev; Russia	Konstantin Khabalashvili; Georgia	Davit Apoyan; Armenia
66 kg	Magomed Kurbanaliev; Russia	Konstantin Khabalashvili; Georgia	Mustafa Kaya; Turkey
74 kg	Zaur Makiev; Russia	Ahmed Dudarov; Germany	Nyambayar Baatar; Mongolia
74 kg	Zaur Makiev; Russia	Ahmed Dudarov; Germany	Jumber Kvelashvili; Georgia
84 kg	Mohammad Ebrahimi; Iran	Pat Downey; United States	Evgheni Eremiev; Moldova
84 kg	Mohammad Ebrahimi; Iran	Pat Downey; United States	Shamil Kudiyamagomedov; Russia
96 kg	Mehran Mirzaeishafe; Iran	Gadzhi Sharipov; Azerbaijan	Ali Böceoğlu; Turkey
96 kg	Mehran Mirzaeishafe; Iran	Gadzhi Sharipov; Azerbaijan	Yermukambet Inkar; Kazakhstan
120 kg	Magomedgadzhi Nurasulov; Russia	Muradin Kushkhov; Ukraine	Geno Petriashvili; Georgia
120 kg	Magomedgadzhi Nurasulov; Russia	Muradin Kushkhov; Ukraine	Ali Magomedibirov; Azerbaijan

=== Greco-Roman ===
Event	Gold	Silver	Bronze
50 kg	Murad Bazarov; Azerbaijan	Artur Labazanov; Russia	Tolgahan Karataş; Turkey
50 kg	Murad Bazarov; Azerbaijan	Artur Labazanov; Russia	Alí Soto Macías; Mexico
55 kg	Eldaniz Azizli; Azerbaijan	Victor Ciobanu; Moldova	Shinobu Ota; Japan
55 kg	Eldaniz Azizli; Azerbaijan	Victor Ciobanu; Moldova	Vichev Ivanov; Bulgaria
60 kg	Zaur Kabaloev; Russia	Ramin Taherisartang; Iran	Enes Başar; Turkey
60 kg	Zaur Kabaloev; Russia	Ramin Taherisartang; Iran	Jesse Thielke; United States
66 kg	Jeyhun Aliyev; Azerbaijan	Magomed Chuhalov; Russia	Mehdi Zeidvand; Iran
66 kg	Jeyhun Aliyev; Azerbaijan	Magomed Chuhalov; Russia	Dominik Etlinger; Croatia
74 kg	Kazbek Kilov; Belarus	Tornike Dzamashvili; Georgia	Payam Bouyeri; Iran
74 kg	Kazbek Kilov; Belarus	Tornike Dzamashvili; Georgia	Karapet Chalyan; Armenia
84 kg	Barış Güngör; Turkey	Arkadiy Blyumin; Ukraine	Peng Fei; China
84 kg	Barış Güngör; Turkey	Arkadiy Blyumin; Ukraine	Samba Diong; France
96 kg	Vilius Laurinaitis; Lithuania	Peter Oehler; Germany	Iakobi Kajaia; Georgia
96 kg	Vilius Laurinaitis; Lithuania	Peter Oehler; Germany	Marthin Nielsen; Norway
120 kg	Bálint Lám; Hungary	Shota Gogisvanidze; Georgia	Yannnan Zhang; China
120 kg	Bálint Lám; Hungary	Shota Gogisvanidze; Georgia	Zaur Mehraliev; Azerbaijan

=== Women's freestyle ===
Event	Gold	Silver	Bronze
44 kg	Rie Matsumoto; Japan	Ilona Semkiv; Ukraine	Erin Golston; United States
44 kg	Rie Matsumoto; Japan	Ilona Semkiv; Ukraine	Indu Chaudhary; India
48 kg	Yuki Irie; Japan	Vu Thi Hang; Vietnam	Nadezhda Fedorova; Russia
48 kg	Yuki Irie; Japan	Vu Thi Hang; Vietnam	Mercédesz Dénes; Hungary
51 kg	Erkhembayaryn Davaachimeg; Mongolia	Merve Kenger; Turkey	Lilya Horishna; Ukraine
51 kg	Erkhembayaryn Davaachimeg; Mongolia	Merve Kenger; Turkey	Chunling Yang; China
55 kg	Kanako Murata; Japan	Zhong Xuechun; China	Petra Olli; Finland
55 kg	Kanako Murata; Japan	Zhong Xuechun; China	Zalina Sidakova; Belarus
59 kg	Chiho Hamada; Japan	Hafize Şahin; Turkey	Feng Jiamin; China
59 kg	Chiho Hamada; Japan	Hafize Şahin; Turkey	Oksana Kukhta; Ukraine
63 kg	Anastasiya Huchok; Belarus	Maria Lyulkova; Russia	Yekaterina Larionova; Kazakhstan
63 kg	Anastasiya Huchok; Belarus	Maria Lyulkova; Russia	Alli Ragan; United States
67 kg	Dorothy Yeats; Canada	Svetlana Babushkina; Russia	Sara Dosho; Japan
67 kg	Dorothy Yeats; Canada	Svetlana Babushkina; Russia	Daria Palinska; Poland
72 kg	Zhou Feng; China	Cynthia Vescan; France	Gamze Durukan; Turkey
72 kg	Zhou Feng; China	Cynthia Vescan; France	Halina Leuchanka; Belarus
