= 2018 World Wrestling Championships – Women's freestyle 62 kg =

Women's freestyle 62 kg at the 2018 World Championships
- Venue: László Papp Budapest Sports Arena
- Dates: 24–25 October 2018
- Competitors: 25 from 25 nations

Medalists
gold medal	Taybe Yusein	Bulgaria
silver medal	Yukako Kawai	Japan
bronze medal	Yuliya Tkach	Ukraine
bronze medal	Mallory Velte	United States

The women's freestyle 62 kilograms is a competition featured at the 2018 World Wrestling Championships. It was held in Budapest, Hungary on 24 and 25 October.

This freestyle wrestling competition consists of a single-elimination tournament, with a repechage used to determine the winner of two bronze medals. The two finalists face off for gold and silver medals. Each wrestler who loses to one of the two finalists moves into the repechage, culminating in a pair of bronze medal matches featuring the semifinal losers each facing the remaining repechage opponent from their half of the bracket.

== Results ==
Legend

- F — Won by fall

=== Final ===
Final
Yukako Kawai (JPN)	2
Taybe Yusein (BUL)	6

=== Top half ===
Round of 32
Nathaly Grimán (VEN)	2
Marianna Sastin (HUN)	5
Aminat Adeniyi (NGR)	0
Yukako Kawai (JPN)	8

Round of 16
Yuliya Tkach (UKR)	3
Luisa Niemesch (GER)	2
Johanna Mattsson (SWE)	8^{F}
Nguyễn Thị Mỹ Hạnh (VIE)	0
Sakshi Malik (IND)	6
Anzhela Fomenko (RUS)	0
Marianna Sastin (HUN)	1
Yukako Kawai (JPN)	2

Quarterfinals
Yuliya Tkach (UKR)	6^{F}
Johanna Mattsson (SWE)	2
Sakshi Malik (IND)	2
Yukako Kawai (JPN)	16

Semifinals
Yuliya Tkach (UKR)	3
Yukako Kawai (JPN)	4

=== Bottom half ===
Round of 32
Hang Jung-won (KOR)	0
Enkhbatyn Gantuyaa (MGL)	6
Ayaulym Kassymova (KAZ)	6
Aslı Tuğcu (TUR)	8^{F}
Sara Da Col (ITA)	0
Mallory Velte (USA)	10
Giedrė Blekaitytė (LTU)	2
Jackeline Rentería (COL)	4^{F}
Taybe Yusein (BUL)	5
Elmira Gambarova (AZE)	5
Berthe Etane Ngolle (CMR)	1
Bao Lingling (CHN)	3
Jessica Brouillette (CAN)	9
Veranika Ivanova (BLR)	1

Round of 16
Enkhbatyn Gantuyaa (MGL)	4^{F}
Aslı Tuğcu (TUR)	0
Mallory Velte (USA)	14
Jackeline Rentería (COL)	6
Taybe Yusein (BUL)	7^{F}
Bao Lingling (CHN)	1
Jessica Brouillette (CAN)	0
Laís Nunes (BRA)	10

Quarterfinals
Enkhbatyn Gantuyaa (MGL)	4
Mallory Velte (USA)	14
Taybe Yusein (BUL)	7
Laís Nunes (BRA)	1

Semifinals
Mallory Velte (USA)	0
Taybe Yusein (BUL)	2^{F}

=== Repechage ===
Repechage round 1
Aminat Adeniyi (NGR)	2
Marianna Sastin (HUN)	6
Elmira Gambarova (AZE)	2
Bao Lingling (CHN)	6^{F}

Repechage round 2
Marianna Sastin (HUN)	3
Sakshi Malik (IND)	2
Bao Lingling (CHN)	2
Laís Nunes (BRA)	5

Bronze medals
Marianna Sastin (HUN)	0
Yuliya Tkach (UKR)	2
Laís Nunes (BRA)	1
Mallory Velte (USA)	2
