= Lyubov Ovcharova =

Russian freestyle wrestler

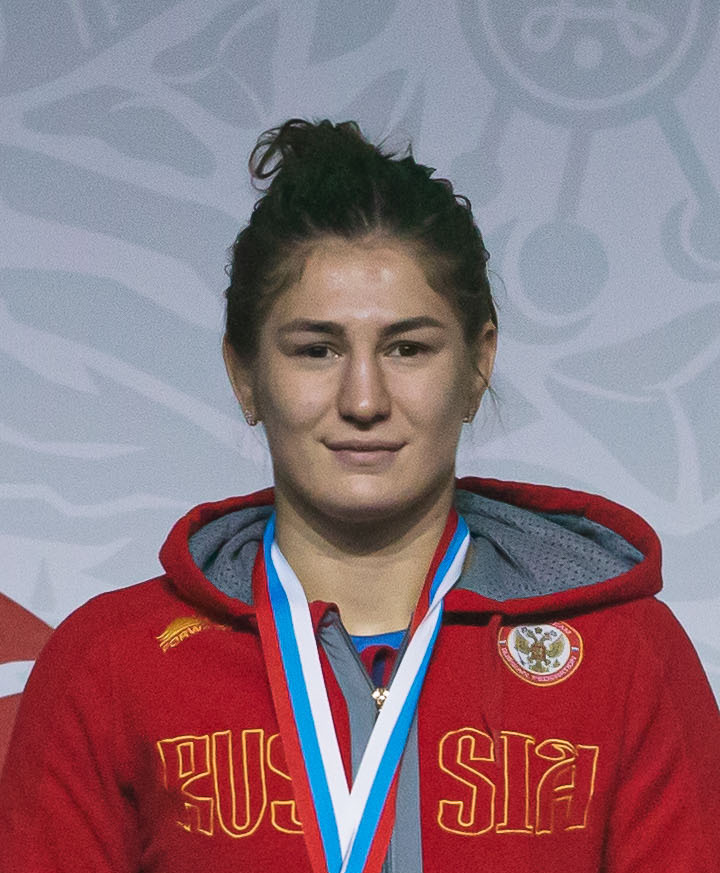
- Ovcharova at the 2020 Russian National Women's Freestyle Wrestling Championships

Personal information
- Native name: Любовь Михайловна Овчарова
- Full name: Lyubov Mikhailovna Ovcharova
- National team: Russia
- Born: 23 October 1995 (age 30) Belorechensk, Krasnodar Krai, Russia

Sport
- Country: Russia
- Sport: Amateur wrestling
- Event: Freestyle
Medal record
Women's freestyle wrestling
Representing Russia
World Championships
| Silver medal – second place | 2019 Nur-Sultan | 59 kg |
Individual World Cup
| Bronze medal – third place | 2020 Belgrade | 62 kg |
European Championships
| Gold medal – first place | 2017 Novi Sad | 60 kg |
| Bronze medal – third place | 2020 Rome | 59 kg |
European U23 Championships
| Gold medal – first place | 2017 Szombathely | 60 kg |

Lyubov Mikhailovna Ovcharova (Russian: Любовь Михайловна Овчарова, also transliterated Liubov, born 23 October 1995) is a Russian freestyle wrestler. She won the silver medal in the women's 59 kg event at the 2019 World Wrestling Championships held in Nur-Sultan, Kazakhstan. In 2021, she competed at the 2020 Summer Olympics in Tokyo, Japan.

== Career ==
At the 2017 European U23 Wrestling Championship held in Szombathely, Hungary, Ovcharova won the gold medal in the women's 60 kg event. At the 2017 European Wrestling Championships held in Novi Sad, Serbia, she also won the gold medal in the women's 60 kg event. In the final, she defeated Anastasija Grigorjeva of Latvia. In that same year, she also competed in the women's freestyle 60 kg event at the 2017 World Wrestling Championships held in Paris, France.

At the 2020 European Wrestling Championships held in Rome, Italy, Ovcharova won one of the bronze medals in the women's 59 kg event. In her bronze medal match she defeated Elif Yanık of Turkey. In the same year, she also won one of the bronze medals in the women's 62 kg event at the 2020 Individual Wrestling World Cup held in Belgrade, Serbia.

In March 2021, Ovcharova competed at the European Qualification Tournament in Budapest, Hungary hoping to qualify for the 2020 Summer Olympics in Tokyo, Japan. She was eliminated in her first match by Kriszta Incze of Romania. In April 2021, she competed in the 65 kg event at the European Wrestling Championships in Warsaw, Poland. In May 2021, she qualified at the World Olympic Qualification Tournament in Sofia, Bulgaria to compete at the 2020 Summer Olympics. A month later, she won one of the bronze medals in her event at the 2021 Poland Open held in Warsaw, Poland.

In August 2021, Ovcharova lost her bronze medal match against Taybe Yusein of Bulgaria in the women's 62 kg event at the 2020 Summer Olympics in Tokyo, Japan.

== Major results ==
| Year | Tournament | Location | Result | Event |
|---|---|---|---|---|
| 2017 | European Championships | Novi Sad, Serbia | 1st | Freestyle 60 kg |
| 2019 | World Championships | Nur-Sultan, Kazakhstan | 2nd | Freestyle 59 kg |
| 2020 | European Championships | Rome, Italy | 3rd | Freestyle 59 kg |
