= Wrestling at the 2015 European Games – Women's freestyle 63 kg =

Women's freestyle 63 kg at the 2015 European Games
- Venue: Heydar Aliyev Arena
- Date: 16 June
- Competitors: 16 from 16 nations

Medalists
| gold medal | Valeria Lazinskaya | Russia |
| silver medal | Yuliya Tkach | Ukraine |
| bronze medal | Maryia Mamashuk | Belarus |
| bronze medal | Anastasija Grigorjeva | Latvia |

Women's freestyle 63 kg competition at the 2015 European Games in Baku, Azerbaijan, took place on 16 June at the Heydar Aliyev Arena.

== Schedule ==
All times are Azerbaijan Summer Time (UTC+05:00)

| Date | Time | Event |
|---|---|---|
| Tuesday, 16 June 2015 | 11:00 | 1/8 finals |
| Tuesday, 16 June 2015 | 13:00 | Quarterfinals |
| Tuesday, 16 June 2015 | 13:00 | Semifinals |
| Tuesday, 16 June 2015 | 15:00 | Repechage |
| Tuesday, 16 June 2015 | 19:00 | Finals |

== Results ==
Legend

- F — Won by fall

1/8 finals
(Belarus) Maryia Mamashuk (BLR) | 8
(Turkey) Buse Tosun (TUR) | 6
(Germany) Nadine Weinauge (GER) | 8
(Greece) Agoro Papavasileiou (GRE) | 4
(Ukraine) Yuliya Tkach (UKR) | 10^{F}
(Romania) Andrea Simon (ROU) | 0
(Italy) Dalma Caneva (ITA) | 3
(Poland) Monika Michalik (POL) | 10
(Finland) Petra Olli (FIN)
(Russia) Valeria Lazinskaya (RUS) | WO
(Bulgaria) Elina Vaseva (BUL) | 2
(Latvia) Anastasija Grigorjeva (LAT) | 12^{F}
(Hungary) Gabriella Sleisz (HUN) | 0
(Czech Republic) Adéla Hanzlíčková (CZE) | 5^{F}
(Azerbaijan) Elmira Gambarova (AZE) | 0
(Sweden) Henna Johansson (SWE) | 4^{F}

Quarterfinals
(Belarus) Maryia Mamashuk (BLR) | 8^{F}
(Germany) Nadine Weinauge (GER) | 0
(Ukraine) Yuliya Tkach (UKR) | 3
(Poland) Monika Michalik (POL) | 0
(Russia) Valeria Lazinskaya (RUS) | 4
(Latvia) Anastasija Grigorjeva (LAT) | 3
(Czech Republic) Adéla Hanzlíčková (CZE) | 5
(Sweden) Henna Johansson (SWE) | 15^{F}

Semifinals
(Belarus) Maryia Mamashuk (BLR) | 0
(Ukraine) Yuliya Tkach (UKR) | 6^{F}
(Russia) Valeria Lazinskaya (RUS) | 2^{F}
(Sweden) Henna Johansson (SWE) | 2

Final
(Ukraine) Yuliya Tkach (UKR) | 4
(Russia) Valeria Lazinskaya (RUS) | 5

=== Repechage ===
Repechage round 1
(Romania) Andrea Simon (ROU) | 5^{F}
(Poland) Monika Michalik (POL) | 0
(Finland) Petra Olli (FIN)
(Latvia) Anastasija Grigorjeva (LAT) | WO

Bronze medal match
(Romania) Andrea Simon (ROU) | 0
(Belarus) Maryia Mamashuk (BLR) | 10
(Latvia) Anastasija Grigorjeva (LAT) | 3
(Sweden) Henna Johansson (SWE) | 1
