= 2017 European Wrestling Championships – Women's freestyle 63 kg =

The women's freestyle 63 kg is a competition featured at the 2017 European Wrestling Championships, and was held in Novi Sad, Serbia on May 2.

== Medalists ==
Gold	Monika Michalik; Poland
Silver	Taybe Yusein; Bulgaria
Bronze	Sara Da Col; Italy
Bronze	Yuliya Tkach; Ukraine

== Results ==
Legend

- F — Won by fall

=== Top half ===
==== Section 1 ====
Qualification
Ana Vadaš (SRB)	0
Laura Skujiņa (LAT)	6^{F}
Taybe Yusein (BUL)	8^{F}
Hafize Şahin (TUR)	0
Veranika Ivanova (BLR)	1
Yuliya Tkach (UKR)	8^{F}
Giedrė Blekaitytė (LTU)	0
Inna Trazhukova (RUS)	11
Elmira Gambarova (AZE)	4^{F}
Henna Johansson (SWE)	0

Quarterfinals
Monika Michalik (POL)	10
Sara Da Col (ITA)	0
Adéla Hanzlíčková (CZE)	0
Laura Skujiņa (LAT)	10
Taybe Yusein (BUL)	6
Yuliya Tkach (UKR)	4
Inna Trazhukova (RUS)	8
Elmira Gambarova (AZE)	2

Semifinals
Monika Michalik (POL)	7
Laura Skujiņa (LAT)	2
Taybe Yusein (BUL)	16
Inna Trazhukova (RUS)	14

Final
Monika Michalik (POL)	2
Taybe Yusein (BUL)	2

=== Repechage ===
Repechage round 2
Hafize Şahin (TUR)	0
Yuliya Tkach (UKR)	10

Bronze medals
Sara Da Col (ITA)	4
Laura Skujiņa (LAT)	2
Yuliya Tkach (UKR)	6^{F}
Inna Trazhukova (RUS)	7
