= 2013 European Wrestling Championships – Women's freestyle 59 kg =

The women's freestyle 59 kg is a competition featured at the 2013 European Wrestling Championships, and was held at the Tbilisi Sports Palace in Tbilisi, Georgia on 20 March 2013.

== Medalists ==
Gold	Anastasiya Huchok; Belarus
Silver	Zhargalma Tsyrenova; Russia
Bronze	Tetyana Lavrenchuk; Ukraine
Bronze	Hafize Şahin; Turkey

== Results ==
Legend

- F — Won by fall

=== Main Draw ===
Round of 16
Tetyana Lavrenchuk (UKR)	1	5^{F}
Martina Riegler (AUT)	0	1
Hafize Şahin (TUR)	1	2
Carola Rainero (ITA)	0	2
Luisa Niemesch (GER)	1	6
Georgiana Paic (ROU)	0	0
Ana Meier (POR)	0
Zhargalma Tsyrenova (RUS)	4^{F}
Mimi Hristova (BUL)	1	1
Anna Żwirydowska (POL)	0	0

Quarterfinals
Gabriella Sleisz (HUN)	0	0
Anastasiya Huchok (BLR)	5	4
Irina Netreba (AZE)	1	1	0
Tetyana Lavrenchuk (UKR)	0	3	1
Hafize Şahin (TUR)	10	1	3^{F}
Luisa Niemesch (GER)	5	3	2
Zhargalma Tsyrenova (RUS)	0	2	5
Mimi Hristova (BUL)	1	0	0

Semifinals
Anastasiya Huchok (BLR)	4	3
Tetyana Lavrenchuk (UKR)	1	0
Hafize Şahin (TUR)	0	0
Zhargalma Tsyrenova (RUS)	6	5^{F}

Final
Anastasiya Huchok (BLR)	1	1
Zhargalma Tsyrenova (RUS)	0	0

=== Repechage ===
Repechage round 1
Ana Meier (POR)	0
Mimi Hristova (BUL)	4^{F}

Bronze medals
Gabriella Sleisz (HUN)	0	0
Tetyana Lavrenchuk (UKR)	1	2
Mimi Hristova (BUL)	2	3
Hafize Şahin (TUR)	3	3
