= 2015 World Wrestling Championships – Women's freestyle 58 kg =

Women's freestyle 58 kg at the 2015 World Championships
- Venue: Orleans Arena
- Dates: 10 September 2015
- Competitors: 31 from 31 nations

Medalists
gold medal	Kaori Icho	Japan
silver medal	Petra Olli	Finland
bronze medal	Elif Jale Yeşilırmak	Turkey
bronze medal	Yuliya Ratkevich	Azerbaijan

The Women's freestyle 58 kilograms is a competition featured at the 2015 World Wrestling Championships, and was held in Las Vegas, United States on 10 September 2015.

This freestyle wrestling competition consisted of a single-elimination tournament, with a repechage used to determine the winners of two bronze medals.

== Results ==
Legend

- F — Won by fall

=== Final ===
Final
Kaori Icho (JPN)	10
Petra Olli (FIN)	0

=== Top half ===
Round of 32
Phạm Thị Loan (VIE)	0
Roksana Zasina (POL)	10
Jackeline Rentería (COL)	12
Yanet Sovero (PER)	10
Alli Ragan (USA)	4
Baatarjavyn Shoovdor (MGL)	2
Alejandra Romero (MEX)	0
Elif Jale Yeşilırmak (TUR)	6
Kaori Icho (JPN)	10
Geeta Phogat (IND)	0
Grace Bullen (NOR)	4
Luisa Niemesch (GER)	3
Um Ji-eun (KOR)	0
Marianna Sastin (HUN)	10

Round of 16
Mimi Hristova (BUL)	7
Roksana Zasina (POL)	2
Jackeline Rentería (COL)	5
Alli Ragan (USA)	0
Elif Jale Yeşilırmak (TUR)	0
Kaori Icho (JPN)	10
Grace Bullen (NOR)	4
Marianna Sastin (HUN)	5

Quarterfinals
Mimi Hristova (BUL)	5
Jackeline Rentería (COL)	10
Kaori Icho (JPN)	10
Marianna Sastin (HUN)	0

Semifinals
Jackeline Rentería (COL)	0
Kaori Icho (JPN)	10^{F}

=== Bottom half ===
Round of 32
Natalia Golts (RUS)	0
Yuliya Ratkevich (AZE)	4
Betzabeth Sarco (VEN)	1
Tetyana Lavrenchuk (UKR)	6
Mariana Cherdivara (MDA)	0
Aiyim Abdildina (KAZ)	6^{F}
Carola Rainero (ITA)	2
Zhou Zhangting (CHN)	11
Aisuluu Tynybekova (KGZ)	1
Petra Olli (FIN)	3
Michelle Fazzari (CAN)	6^{F}
Ri Kuk-hyang (PRK)	8
Lissette Antes (ECU)	9
Joice Silva (BRA)	1
Anastasiya Huchok (BLR)	2
Johanna Mattsson (SWE)	7^{F}

Round of 16
Yuliya Ratkevich (AZE)	6
Tetyana Lavrenchuk (UKR)	0
Aiyim Abdildina (KAZ)	10^{F}
Zhou Zhangting (CHN)	14
Petra Olli (FIN)	6
Michelle Fazzari (CAN)	0
Lissette Antes (ECU)	4
Johanna Mattsson (SWE)	4

Quarterfinals
Yuliya Ratkevich (AZE)	7
Aiyim Abdildina (KAZ)	5
Petra Olli (FIN)	5
Johanna Mattsson (SWE)	0

Semifinals
Yuliya Ratkevich (AZE)	6
Petra Olli (FIN)	8

=== Repechage ===
Repechage round 1
Geeta Phogat (IND)	0
Elif Jale Yeşilırmak (TUR)	10^{F}
Aisuluu Tynybekova (KGZ)	5
Michelle Fazzari (CAN)	0

Repechage round 2
Elif Jale Yeşilırmak (TUR)	5
Marianna Sastin (HUN)	2
Aisuluu Tynybekova (KGZ)	0
Johanna Mattsson (SWE)	11

Bronze medals
Elif Jale Yeşilırmak (TUR)	3
Jackeline Rentería (COL)	2
Johanna Mattsson (SWE)	0
Yuliya Ratkevich (AZE)	4
