= Valeria Lazinskaya =

Russian wrestler

Valeria Lazinskaya Валерия Лазинская
Personal information
- Nationality: (Russia) Russian (Kazakhstan) Kazakh
- Born: December 10, 1992 (age 33) Shakhtinsk, Kazakhstan
- Height: 1.65 m (5 ft 5 in)
- Weight: 63 kg (139 lb)

Sport
- Country: Yegoryevsk, Russia
- Sport: Freestyle wrestling
- Club: Yegoryevsk Female Wrestling club
- Coached by: Oleg Chernov
Medal record
Women's freestyle wrestling
Representing Russia
World Championships
Bronze medal – third place	2014 Tashkent	63 kg
Bronze medal – third place	2017 Paris	63 kg
European Games
Gold medal – first place	2015 Baku	63 kg

Valeria Yuryevna Lazinskaya (Russian: Валерия Юрьевна Лазинская; born 10 December 1992, in Shakhtinsk, Kazakhstan) is a Kazakh naturalized Russian female freestyle wrestler. She won the bronze medal the 2014 World Wrestling Championships. In the gold medal match of 2015 European Games, she won rematch World Champion Yuliya Tkach of Ukraine.
