= Aurora Campagna =

Italian freestyle wrestler

Sport
- Country: Italy
- Sport: Amateur wrestling
- Weight class: 62 kg
- Event: Freestyle
Medal record
Women's freestyle wrestling
Representing Italy
European Championships
Silver medal – second place	2019 Bucharest	62 kg
World Junior Championships
Bronze medal – third place	2018 Trnava	62 kg

Aurora Campagna is an Italian freestyle wrestler. She won the silver medal in the 62 kg event at the 2019 European Wrestling Championships held in Bucharest, Romania. In the final, she lost against Taybe Yusein of Bulgaria.

== Career ==
In 2018, she competed in the 62 kg event at the European Wrestling Championships held in Kaspiysk, Russia. She lost her first match against Taybe Yusein of Bulgaria and in the repechage she also lost her next match against Agnieszka Król of Poland. At the 2018 World Junior Wrestling Championships held in Trnava, Slovakia, she won one of the bronze medals in the 62 kg event.

At the 2019 World Wrestling Championships held in Nur-Sultan, Kazakhstan, she was eliminated in her first match by Marianna Sastin of Hungary.

In 2020, she competed in the 62 kg event at the European Wrestling Championships held in Rome, Italy where she was eliminated in her first match by Tetiana Omelchenko of Azerbaijan. In the same year, she competed in the 62 kg event at the 2020 Individual Wrestling World Cup held in Belgrade, Serbia.

In 2021, she lost her bronze medal match in the 62 kg event at the U23 World Wrestling Championships held in Belgrade, Serbia.

== Achievements ==
Year	Tournament	Location	Result	Event
2019	European Championships	Bucharest, Romania	2nd	Freestyle 62 kg
