= 2022 European Wrestling Championships – Women's freestyle 62 kg =

Wrestling competition

Women's freestyle 62 kg at the 2022 European Wrestling Championships
- Venue: BOK Sports Hall
- Location: Budapest, Hungary
- Dates: 31 March - 1 April
- Competitors: 12

Medalists
gold medal	Taybe Yusein	Bulgaria
silver medal	Luisa Niemesch	Germany
bronze medal	Natalia Kubaty	Poland
bronze medal	Ilona Prokopevniuk	Ukraine

The women's freestyle 62 kg was a competition featured at the 2022 European Wrestling Championships, and was held in Budapest, Hungary on March 31 and 1 April.

== Results ==
Legend

- F — Won by fall
- WO — Won by walkover

=== Main Bracket ===
1/8 finals
Lydia Pérez (ESP)	4
Yağmur Çakmak (TUR)	5
Nataliia Shafir Mazur (ISR)	0
Olivia Henningsson (SWE)	10
Nikolett Szabó (HUN)	3
Ana Fabijan (SRB)	4
Améline Douarre (FRA)	0
Aurora Campagna (ITA)	7

Quarterfinals
Taybe Yusein (BUL)	9
Yağmur Çakmak (TUR)	0
Olivia Henningsson (SWE)	2
Natalia Kubaty (POL)	4^{F}
Luisa Niemesch (GER)	10
Ana Fabijan (SRB)	0
Aurora Campagna (ITA)	0
Ilona Prokopevniuk (UKR)	8

Semifinals
Taybe Yusein (BUL)	10
Natalia Kubaty (POL)	0
Luisa Niemesch (GER)	5
Ilona Prokopevniuk (UKR)	3

Final
Taybe Yusein (BUL)	7
Luisa Niemesch (GER)	0

=== Repechage ===
Bronze medal match
Yağmur Çakmak (TUR)	0
Natalia Kubaty (POL)	10
Ana Fabijan (SRB)
Ilona Prokopevniuk (UKR)	WO

== Final standing ==
Rank	Wrestler	UWW Points
1st place, gold medalist(s)	Taybe Yusein (BUL)	10000
2nd place, silver medalist(s)	Luisa Niemesch (GER)	8000
3rd place, bronze medalist(s)	Ilona Prokopevniuk (UKR)	6500
3rd place, bronze medalist(s)	Natalia Kubaty (POL)	6500
5	Yağmur Çakmak (TUR)	5000
5	Ana Fabijan (SRB)	5000
7	Olivia Henningsson (SWE)	4400
8	Aurora Campagna (ITA)	4000
9	Lydia Pérez (ESP)	3500
10	Nikolett Szabó (HUN)	3100
11	Améline Douarre (FRA)	1000
12	Nataliia Shafir Mazur (ISR)	800
