= Yukako Kawai =

Japanese freestyle wrestler (born 1997)

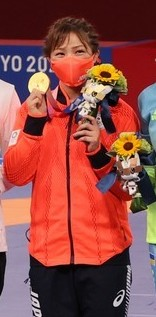
- Kawai at the 2020 Summer Olympics

Personal information
- Born: 27 August 1997 (age 28) Tsubata, Ishikawa Prefecture
- Height: 162 cm (5 ft 4 in)

Sport
- Country: Japan
- Sport: Amateur wrestling
- Weight class: 62 kg
- Event: Freestyle
Medal record
Women's freestyle wrestling
Representing Japan
Olympic Games
Gold medal – first place	2020 Tokyo	62 kg
World Championships
Silver medal – second place	2018 Budapest	62 kg
Bronze medal – third place	2019 Nur-Sultan	62 kg
Asian Championships
Gold medal – first place	2020 New Delhi	62 kg
Silver medal – second place	2019 Xi'an	62 kg
World U23 Championships
Gold medal – first place	2018 Bucharest	62 kg

Yukako Kawai (川井 友香子, Kawai Yukako; born 27 August 1997) is a Japanese freestyle wrestler. She won the gold medal in the women's 62 kg event at the 2020 Summer Olympics held in Tokyo, Japan.

In 2018, she won the silver medal in the women's 62 kg event at the World Wrestling Championships held in Budapest, Hungary. A year later, she won one of the bronze medals in this event.

== Career ==
In 2017, she competed in the women's 63 kg event at the World Wrestling Championships in Paris, France without winning a medal. She won her first match against Elmira Gambarova of Azerbaijan but she was eliminated from the competition in her next match against Jackeline Rentería of Colombia. Rentería went on to win one of the bronze medals.

She won the gold medal in the women's 62 kg event at the 2020 Asian Wrestling Championships held in New Delhi, India. In the final, she defeated Ayaulym Kassymova of Kazakhstan.

In 2021, Kawai won the gold medal in the 62 kg wrestling division at the Tokyo Olympics. Her elder sister Risako won gold in the 57 kg division the following day.

== Achievements ==
Year	Tournament	Location	Result	Event
2018	World Championships	Budapest, Hungary	2nd	Freestyle 62 kg
2019	Asian Championships	Xi'an, China	2nd	Freestyle 62 kg
2019	World Championships	Nur-Sultan, Kazakhstan	3rd	Freestyle 62 kg
2020	Asian Championships	New Delhi, India	1st	Freestyle 62 kg
2021	Summer Olympics	Tokyo, Japan	1st	Freestyle 62 kg
