= 2021 European Wrestling Championships – Women's freestyle 62 kg =

Wrestling competition

The women's freestyle 62 kg is a competition featured at the 2021 European Wrestling Championships, and was held in Warsaw, Poland on April 22 and April 23.

== Medalists ==
Gold	Iryna Koliadenko; Ukraine
Silver	Marianna Sastin; Hungary
Bronze	Katarzyna Mądrowska; Poland
Bronze	Veranika Ivanova; Belarus

== Results ==
Legend

- F — Won by fall
- WO — Won by walkover

Round of 16
Mariana Cherdivara (MDA)	1
Iryna Koliadenko (UKR)	12

Quarterfinals
~~Taybe Yusein (BUL)~~
Marianna Sastin (HUN)	WO
Cansu Aksoy (TUR)	2
Katarzyna Mądrowska (POL)	13
Debora Lawnitzak (GER)	0
Valeria Koblova (RUS)	10
Veranika Ivanova (BLR)	1
Iryna Koliadenko (UKR)	12

Semifinals
Marianna Sastin (HUN)	WO
Katarzyna Mądrowska (POL)
Valeria Koblova (RUS)	2
Iryna Koliadenko (UKR)	5

Final
Marianna Sastin (HUN)	1
Iryna Koliadenko (UKR)	4

Repechage round 1
Mariana Cherdivara (MDA)
Veranika Ivanova (BLR)	WO

Bronze medal match
~~Taybe Yusein (BUL)~~
Katarzyna Mądrowska (POL)	WO
Veranika Ivanova (BLR)	5^{F}
Valeria Koblova (RUS)	0

== Final standing ==
Rank	Athlete
1st place, gold medalist(s)	Iryna Koliadenko (UKR)
2nd place, silver medalist(s)	Marianna Sastin (HUN)
3rd place, bronze medalist(s)	Katarzyna Mądrowska (POL)
3rd place, bronze medalist(s)	Veranika Ivanova (BLR)
5	Valeria Koblova (RUS)
6	Cansu Aksoy (TUR)
7	Mariana Cherdivara (MDA)
8	Debora Lawnitzak (GER)
—	Taybe Yusein (BUL)
