= 2018 European Wrestling Championships – Women's freestyle 62 kg =

The women's freestyle 62 kg is a competition featured at the 2018 European Wrestling Championships, and was held in Kaspiysk, Russia on May 3 and May 4.

== Medalists ==
| Gold | Taybe Yusein; Bulgaria |
| Silver | Inna Trazhukova; Russia |
| Bronze | Ilona Prokopevniuk; Ukraine |
| Bronze | Veranika Ivanova; Belarus |

== Results ==
Legend

- F — Won by fall

=== Main Bracket ===
1/8 finals
Aurora Campagna (ITA) | 0
Taybe Yusein (BUL) | 5
Kriszta Incze (ROU) | 0
Johanna Mattsson (SWE) | 4^{F}
Veranika Ivanova (BLR) | 6
Elmira Gambarova (AZE) | 4

Quarterfinals
Inna Trazhukova (RUS) | 4
Ilona Prokopevniuk (UKR) | 2
Derya Bayhan (TUR) | 0
Luzie Manzke (GER) | 11
Agnieszka Król (POL) | 0
Taybe Yusein (BUL) | 11
Johanna Mattsson (SWE) | 0
Veranika Ivanova (BLR) | 6^{F}

Semifinals
Inna Trazhukova (RUS) | 8
Luzie Manzke (GER) | 2
Taybe Yusein (BUL) | 10^{F}
Veranika Ivanova (BLR) | 2

Final
Inna Trazhukova (RUS) | 8
Taybe Yusein (BUL) | 11

=== Repechage ===
Repechage round 1
Aurora Campagna (ITA) | 1
Agnieszka Król (POL) | 3

Bronze medal match
Ilona Prokopevniuk (UKR) | 4^{F}
Luzie Manzke (GER) | 0
Agnieszka Król (POL) | 2
Veranika Ivanova (BLR) | 8^{F}
