= 2020 European Wrestling Championships – Women's freestyle 59 kg =

Competition at the 2020 European Wrestling Championships

The women's freestyle 59 kg is a competition featured at the 2020 European Wrestling Championships, and was held in Rome, Italy on February 12 and February 13.

== Medalists ==
Gold	Anastasia Nichita; Moldova
Silver	Bilyana Dudova; Bulgaria
Bronze	Lyubov Ovcharova; Russia
Bronze	Anhelina Lysak; Ukraine

== Results ==
Legend

- F — Won by fall
- WO — Won by walkover

1/8 finals
Yuliya Pisarenka (BLR)	3
Laura Mertens (GER)	3
Elmira Gambarova (AZE)	4
Anhelina Lysak (UKR)	10
Ramóna Galambos (HUN)	0
Anastasia Nichita (MDA)	10

Quarterfinals
Bilyana Dudova (BUL)	4
Elif Yanık (TUR)	2
Lyubov Ovcharova (RUS)	2^{F}
Dominika Kulwicka (POL)	0
Teresa Lumia (ITA)
Laura Mertens (GER)	WO
Anhelina Lysak (UKR)	0
Anastasia Nichita (MDA)	8^{F}

Semifinals
Bilyana Dudova (BUL)	7
Lyubov Ovcharova (RUS)	6
Laura Mertens (GER)	0
Anastasia Nichita (MDA)	10

Final
Bilyana Dudova (BUL)	4
Anastasia Nichita (MDA)	5

Repechage round 1
Ramóna Galambos (HUN)	0
Anhelina Lysak (UKR)	10

Bronze medal match
Elif Yanık (TUR)	3
Lyubov Ovcharova (RUS)	14
Anhelina Lysak (UKR)	6^{F}
Laura Mertens (GER)	0

== Final standing ==
Rank	Athlete
1st place, gold medalist(s)	Anastasia Nichita (MDA)
2nd place, silver medalist(s)	Bilyana Dudova (BUL)
3rd place, bronze medalist(s)	Lyubov Ovcharova (RUS)
3rd place, bronze medalist(s)	Anhelina Lysak (UKR)
5	Elif Yanık (TUR)
5	Laura Mertens (GER)
7	Elmira Gambarova (AZE)
8	Yuliya Pisarenka (BLR)
9	Dominika Kulwicka (POL)
10	Ramóna Galambos (HUN)
11	Teresa Lumia (ITA)
