= 2020 Individual Wrestling World Cup – Women's freestyle 62 kg =

The Women's freestyle 62 kg was a competition featured at the 2020 Individual Wrestling World Cup, and was held in Belgrade, Serbia on 14 and 15 December 2020.

== Medalists ==
Gold	Aisuluu Tynybekova; Kyrgyzstan
Silver	Anastasija Grigorjeva; Latvia
Bronze	Ilona Prokopevniuk; Ukraine
Bronze	Lyubov Ovcharova; Russia

== Results ==
Legend

- F — Won by fall

1/8 finals
Anna Szél (HUN)	0
Sonam Malik (IND)	7
Tetiana Omelchenko (AZE)	8
Lydia Pérez (ESP)	0
Aurora Campagna (ITA)	3
Lyubov Ovcharova (RUS)	4
Kriszta Incze (ROU)	0
Aisuluu Tynybekova (KGZ)	10
Cansu Aksoy (TUR)	8^{F}
Améline Douarre (FRA)	1

Quarterfinals
Luisa Niemesch (GER)	4
Anastasija Grigorjeva (LAT)	6
Ilona Prokopevniuk (UKR)	5^{F}
Sonam Malik (IND)	4
Tetiana Omelchenko (AZE)	1
Lyubov Ovcharova (RUS)	12
Aisuluu Tynybekova (KGZ)	10
Cansu Aksoy (TUR)	0

Semifinals
Anastasija Grigorjeva (LAT)	10
Ilona Prokopevniuk (UKR)	9
Lyubov Ovcharova (RUS)	2
Aisuluu Tynybekova (KGZ)	13

Final
Anastasija Grigorjeva (LAT)	0
Aisuluu Tynybekova (KGZ)	14^{F}

Repechage round 1
Kriszta Incze (ROU)	6^{F}
Cansu Aksoy (TUR)	0

Bronze medals
Luisa Niemesch (GER)	1
Ilona Prokopevniuk (UKR)	3
Kriszta Incze (ROU)	1
Lyubov Ovcharova (RUS)	1
