= 2018 European Wrestling Championships – Women's freestyle 59 kg =

The women's freestyle 59 kg is a competition featured at the 2018 European Wrestling Championships, is scheduled to be held in Kaspiysk, Russia on May 2 and May 3.

== Medalists ==
Gold	Elif Jale Yeşilırmak; Turkey
Silver	Mimi Hristova; Bulgaria
Bronze	Svetlana Lipatova; Russia
Bronze	Tetiana Omelchenko; Azerbaijan

== Results ==
Legend

- F — Won by fall

=== Main Bracket ===
Quarterfinals		Semifinals		Final
Emma Johansson (SWE)	0
Elif Jale Yeşilırmak (TUR)	10	Elif Jale Yeşilırmak (TUR)	5
Svetlana Lipatova (RUS)	5	Svetlana Lipatova (RUS)	3
Olena Kremzer (UKR)	2			Elif Jale Yeşilırmak (TUR)	6
Katsiaryna Hanchar (BLR)	10			Mimi Hristova (BUL)	4
Kornelija Zaicevaitė (LTU)	0	Katsiaryna Hanchar (BLR)	6
Mimi Hristova (BUL)	8	Mimi Hristova (BUL)	7
Tetiana Omelchenko (AZE)	3

=== Repechage ===
Bronze medal match
Emma Johansson (SWE)
Svetlana Lipatova (RUS)	WO
Tetiana Omelchenko (AZE)	12
Katsiaryna Hanchar (BLR)	2
