= 2016 European Wrestling Championships – Women's freestyle 60 kg =

The women's freestyle 60 kg is a competition featured at the 2016 European Wrestling Championships, and was held in Riga, Latvia on March 9.

== Medalists ==
Gold	Petra Olli; Finland
Silver	Oksana Herhel; Ukraine
Bronze	Yuliya Prontsevitch; Russia
Bronze	Yuliya Ratkevich; Azerbaijan

== Results ==
Legend

- F — Won by fall

=== Top half ===
Round of 16
Jowita Wrzesien (POL)	11
Neslihan Ulusoy (TUR)	0
Anastasiya Huchok (BLR)	4
Yuliya Prontsevitch (RUS)	6

Quarterfinals
Oksana Herhel (UKR)	4^{F}
Charlotte Skauen (NOR)	0
Dzhanan Manolova (BUL)	2
Yuliya Ratkevich (AZE)	8
Gabriella Sleisz (HUN)	0
Petra Olli (FIN)	10
Jowita Wrzesien (POL)	0
Yuliya Prontsevitch (RUS)	5^{F}

Semifinals
Oksana Herhel (UKR)	2
Yuliya Ratkevich (AZE)	2
Petra Olli (FIN)	10
Yuliya Prontsevitch (RUS)	0

Final
Oksana Herhel (UKR)	2
Petra Olli (FIN)	8

=== Repechage ===
Bronze medals
Charlotte Skauen (NOR)	0
Yuliya Ratkevich (AZE)	10^{F}
Gabriella Sleisz (HUN)	0
Yuliya Prontsevitch (RUS)	8
