= Zhargalma Tsyrenova =

Russian wrestler (born 1989)

Zhargalma Tsyrenova Жаргалма Цыренова
Personal information
- Full name: Zhargalma Ochirova Tsyrenova
- Nationality: Russian
- Born: 9 June 1989 (age 37) Ulyukchikan, Buryatia, Russia
- Weight: 60 kg (132 lb)

Sport
- Country: Russia
- Sport: Wrestling
- Event: Freestyle
- Club: High school sports of Buryatia
- Coached by: Yuri Srylev, Maksim Molonov
Medal record
Women's Freestyle wrestling
Representing Russia
European Championships
Silver medal – second place	2013 Tbilisi	59 kg
Golden Grand Prix Ivan Yarygin
Gold medal – first place	2013 Krasnoyarsk	59 kg
Silver medal – second place	2011 Krasnoyarsk	59 kg
Silver medal – second place	2014 Krasnoyarsk	60 kg
Silver medal – second place	2022 Krasnoyarsk	59 kg
Bronze medal – third place	2015 Krasnoyarsk	60 kg
Yasar Dogu Tournament
Silver medal – second place	2022 Istanbul	59 kg

Zhargalma Ochirovna Tsyrenova (Russian: Жаргалма Очировна Цыренова) (born 9 June 1989) is a Russian freestyle wrestler of Buryat descent. She is 2013 European wrestling championships runner up and a bronze medalist at the Golden Grand Prix Ivan Yarygin 2015 in the 60 kg division.

Tsyrenova was born in Barguzinsky District of Buryatia, and her nationality is Buryat. Her parents had 7 sons and 3 daughters, many of whom were keen for wrestling. Zhargalma was the youngest daughter; 3 of her elder brothers were wrestlers and received a title Master of sports. When she was at school, she moved to Ulan-Ude and began to practice wrestling under the supervision of coach Tsyden Gulgenov.

In 2009, Tsyrenova won a silver medal at the Russian wrestling championship in Stavropol, at 2010 - silver medal of Russia wrestling cup, 2011 - silver medal of "Ivan Yarygin International" in Krasnoyarsk. At 2012 she won the Russian wrestling cup in Lobnya.

At the beginning of 2013 Zhargalma Tsyrenova won "Ivan Yarygin International" in Krasnoyarsk, later she won a silver medal of 2013 European Wrestling Championships.

In January 2022, she won the silver medal in the women's 59 kg event at the Golden Grand Prix Ivan Yarygin held in Krasnoyarsk, Russia. In February 2022, she won the silver medal in the women's 59 kg event at the Yasar Dogu Tournament held in Istanbul, Turkey.
