= 2019 European Wrestling Championships – Women's freestyle 62 kg =

The women's freestyle 62 kg is a competition featured at the 2019 European Wrestling Championships, and was held in Bucharest, Romania on April 11 and April 12.

== Medalists ==
Gold	Taybe Yusein; Bulgaria
Silver	Aurora Campagna; Italy
Bronze	Tetiana Omelchenko; Azerbaijan
Bronze	Marianna Sastin; Hungary

== Results ==
Legend

- F — Won by fall

=== Final ===
Final
Taybe Yusein (BUL)	4
Aurora Campagna (ITA)	0

=== Top half ===
Round of 32

Round of 16
Katarzyna Mądrowska (POL)	4^{F}
Georgiana Filip (ROU)	2
Tetiana Omelchenko (AZE)	12
Hedda Strand (NOR)	1
Taybe Yusein (BUL)	10
Améline Douarre (FRA)	2
Ilona Prokopevniuk (UKR)	12
Kathrin Mathis (AUT)	0

Quarterfinals
Katarzyna Mądrowska (POL)	0
Tetiana Omelchenko (AZE)	6
Taybe Yusein (BUL)	8
Ilona Prokopevniuk (UKR)	6

Semifinals
Tetiana Omelchenko (AZE)	0
Taybe Yusein (BUL)	4^{F}

=== Bottom half ===
Round of 32
Mariana Cherdivara (MDA)	2
Lydia Pérez (ESP)	1
Krystsina Sazykina (BLR)	0
Luisa Niemesch (GER)	4

Round of 16
Uliana Tukurenova (RUS)	0
Marianna Sastin (HUN)	5
Aurora Campagna (ITA)	6
Aslı Tuğcu (TUR)	2
Viktorija Augustauskaitė (LTU)	0
Moa Nygren (SWE)	2^{F}
Mariana Cherdivara (MDA)	1
Luisa Niemesch (GER)	3

Quarterfinals
Marianna Sastin (HUN)	2
Aurora Campagna (ITA)	4
Moa Nygren (SWE)	4
Luisa Niemesch (GER)	4

Semifinals
Aurora Campagna (ITA)	6
Moa Nygren (SWE)	3

=== Repechage ===
Repechage round 1
Améline Douarre (FRA)	2
Ilona Prokopevniuk (UKR)	12
Aslı Tuğcu (TUR)	0
Marianna Sastin (HUN)	4

Bronze medal match
Ilona Prokopevniuk (UKR)	4
Tetiana Omelchenko (AZE)	6
Marianna Sastin (HUN)	3
Moa Nygren (SWE)	2
