= 2017 European Wrestling Championships – Women's freestyle 60 kg =

The women's freestyle 60 kg is a competition featured at the 2017 European Wrestling Championships, and was held in Novi Sad, Serbia on May 3.

== Medalists ==
gold	Lyubov Ovcharova; Russia
silver	Anastasija Grigorjeva; Latvia
bronze	Johanna Mattsson; Sweden
bronze	Tetiana Omelchenko; Azerbaijan

== Results ==
Legend

- F — Won by fall

=== Top half ===
Qualification
Anastasija Grigorjeva (LAT)	14
Anhelina Lysak (UKR)	3
Gamze Adakan (TUR)	6
Madzina Sidakova (BLR)	7
Agnieszka Król (POL)	0
Tetiana Omelchenko (AZE)	2^{F}

Quarterfinals
Lyubov Ovcharova (RUS)	8^{F}
Kriszta Incze (ROU)	0
Johanna Mattsson (SWE)	4
Mimi Hristova (BUL)	2
Gabriella Sleisz (HUN)	4
Anastasija Grigorjeva (LAT)	8^{F}
Madzina Sidakova (BLR)	0
Tetiana Omelchenko (AZE)	10

Semifinals
Lyubov Ovcharova (RUS)	4^{F}
Johanna Mattsson (SWE)	0
Anastasija Grigorjeva (LAT)	11
Tetiana Omelchenko (AZE)	1

Final
Lyubov Ovcharova (RUS)	12
Anastasija Grigorjeva (LAT)	5

=== Repechage ===
Repechage round 2
Anhelina Lysak (UKR)	7
Gabriella Sleisz (HUN)	0

Bronze medals
Kriszta Incze (ROU)	1
Johanna Mattsson (SWE)	3
Anhelina Lysak (UKR)	3
Tetiana Omelchenko (AZE)	8
