= 2014 World Wrestling Championships – Women's freestyle 63 kg =

Women's freestyle 63 kg at the 2014 World Championships
- Venue: Gymnastics Sport Palace
- Dates: 12 September 2014
- Competitors: 25 from 25 nations

Medalists
gold medal	Yuliya Tkach	Ukraine
silver medal	Elena Pirozhkova	United States
bronze medal	Valeria Lazinskaya	Russia
bronze medal	Anastasija Grigorjeva	Latvia

The women's freestyle 63 kilograms is a competition featured at the 2014 World Wrestling Championships, and was held in Tashkent, Uzbekistan on 12 September 2014.

This freestyle wrestling competition consisted of a single-elimination tournament, with a repechage used to determine the winners of two bronze medals.

== Results ==
Legend

- F — Won by fall

=== Final ===
Final
Yuliya Tkach (UKR)	4
Elena Pirozhkova (USA)	2

=== Top half ===
Round of 32
Buse Tosun (TUR)	2
Henna Johansson (SWE)	12^{F}

Round of 16
Adéla Hanzlíčková (CZE)	4
Agoro Papavasileiou (GRE)	16
Yuliya Tkach (UKR)	2
Valeria Lazinskaya (RUS)	2
Dalma Caneva (ITA)	10^{F}
Olga Kalinina (KAZ)	1
Ragneta Gurbanzade (AZE)	0
Henna Johansson (SWE)	11

Quarterfinals
Agoro Papavasileiou (GRE)	0
Yuliya Tkach (UKR)	10
Dalma Caneva (ITA)	0
Henna Johansson (SWE)	10

Semifinals
Yuliya Tkach (UKR)	7^{F}
Henna Johansson (SWE)	1

=== Bottom half ===
Round of 32
Jackeline Rentería (COL)	4
Maryia Mamashuk (BLR)	12^{F}
Laís Nunes (BRA)	0
Elina Vaseva (BUL)	10
Wendy Martínez (MEX)	3
Nadine Weinauge (GER)	7
Jacira Mendonca (GBS)	4
Monika Michalik (POL)	13
Wang Xiaoqian (CHN)	10^{F}
Khalbazar Narbaeva (UZB)	2
Navjot Kaur (IND)	0
Danielle Lappage (CAN)	10
Anastasija Grigorjeva (LAT)	4
Elena Pirozhkova (USA)	5
Soronzonboldyn Battsetseg (MGL)	10^{F}
Rio Watari (JPN)	4

Round of 16
Maryia Mamashuk (BLR)	10
Elina Vaseva (BUL)	8
Nadine Weinauge (GER)	0
Monika Michalik (POL)	3
Wang Xiaoqian (CHN)	5
Danielle Lappage (CAN)	10
Elena Pirozhkova (USA)	6
Soronzonboldyn Battsetseg (MGL)	4

Quarterfinals
Maryia Mamashuk (BLR)	6
Monika Michalik (POL)	8
Danielle Lappage (CAN)	1
Elena Pirozhkova (USA)	2

Semifinals
Monika Michalik (POL)	0
Elena Pirozhkova (USA)	3

=== Repechage ===
Repechage round 1
Anastasija Grigorjeva (LAT)	7^{F}
Soronzonboldyn Battsetseg (MGL)	7

Repechage round 2
Valeria Lazinskaya (RUS)	13
Agoro Papavasileiou (GRE)	0
Anastasija Grigorjeva (LAT)	6
Danielle Lappage (CAN)	2

Bronze medals
Valeria Lazinskaya (RUS)	12^{F}
Henna Johansson (SWE)	0
Anastasija Grigorjeva (LAT)	5
Monika Michalik (POL)	1
