= Wrestling at the 2015 European Games – Women's freestyle 58 kg =

Women's freestyle 58 kg at the 2015 European Games
- Venue: Heydar Aliyev Arena
- Date: 16 June
- Competitors: 13 from 13 nations

Medalists
gold medal	Emese Barka	Hungary
silver medal	Tetyana Lavrenchuk	Ukraine
bronze medal	Elif Jale Yeşilırmak	Turkey
bronze medal	Grace Bullen	Norway

Women's freestyle 58 kg competition at the 2015 European Games in Baku, Azerbaijan, took place on 16 June at the Heydar Aliyev Arena.

== Schedule ==
All times are Azerbaijan Summer Time (UTC+05:00)

Date	Time	Event
Tuesday, 16 June 2015	11:00	1/8 finals
Tuesday, 16 June 2015	13:00	Quarterfinals
Tuesday, 16 June 2015	13:00	Semifinals
Tuesday, 16 June 2015	15:00	Repechage
Tuesday, 16 June 2015	19:00	Finals

== Results ==
Legend

- F — Won by fall

1/8 finals
(France) Aurélie Basset (FRA)	4
(Poland) Paulina Grabowska (POL)	3
(Bulgaria) Mimi Hristova (BUL)	7
(Germany) Luisa Niemesch (GER)	0
(Italy) Carola Rainero (ITA)	4
(Azerbaijan) Irina Netreba (AZE)	8
(Russia) Valeria Koblova (RUS)	8
(Moldova) Mariana Cherdivara (MDA)	2
(Norway) Grace Bullen (NOR)	4
(Hungary) Emese Barka (HUN)	11^{F}

Quarterfinals
(Belarus) Anastasiya Huchok (BLR)	12
(Ukraine) Tetyana Lavrenchuk (UKR)	14
(Turkey) Elif Jale Yeşilırmak (TUR)	6^{F}
(France) Aurélie Basset (FRA)	0
(Bulgaria) Mimi Hristova (BUL)	4
(Azerbaijan) Irina Netreba (AZE)	6
(Russia) Valeria Koblova (RUS)
(Hungary) Emese Barka (HUN)	WO

Semifinals
(Ukraine) Tetyana Lavrenchuk (UKR)	3^{F}
(Turkey) Elif Jale Yeşilırmak (TUR)	4
(Azerbaijan) Irina Netreba (AZE)	2
(Hungary) Emese Barka (HUN)	5

Final
(Ukraine) Tetyana Lavrenchuk (UKR)	2
(Hungary) Emese Barka (HUN)	3

=== Repechage ===
Repechage round 1
(Norway) Grace Bullen (NOR)	WO
(Russia) Valeria Koblova (RUS)

Bronze medal match
(Belarus) Anastasiya Huchok (BLR)	5
(Turkey) Elif Jale Yeşilırmak (TUR)	6
(Norway) Grace Bullen (NOR)	4^{F}
(Azerbaijan) Irina Netreba (AZE)	0
