= Petra Olli =

Finnish freestyle wrestler

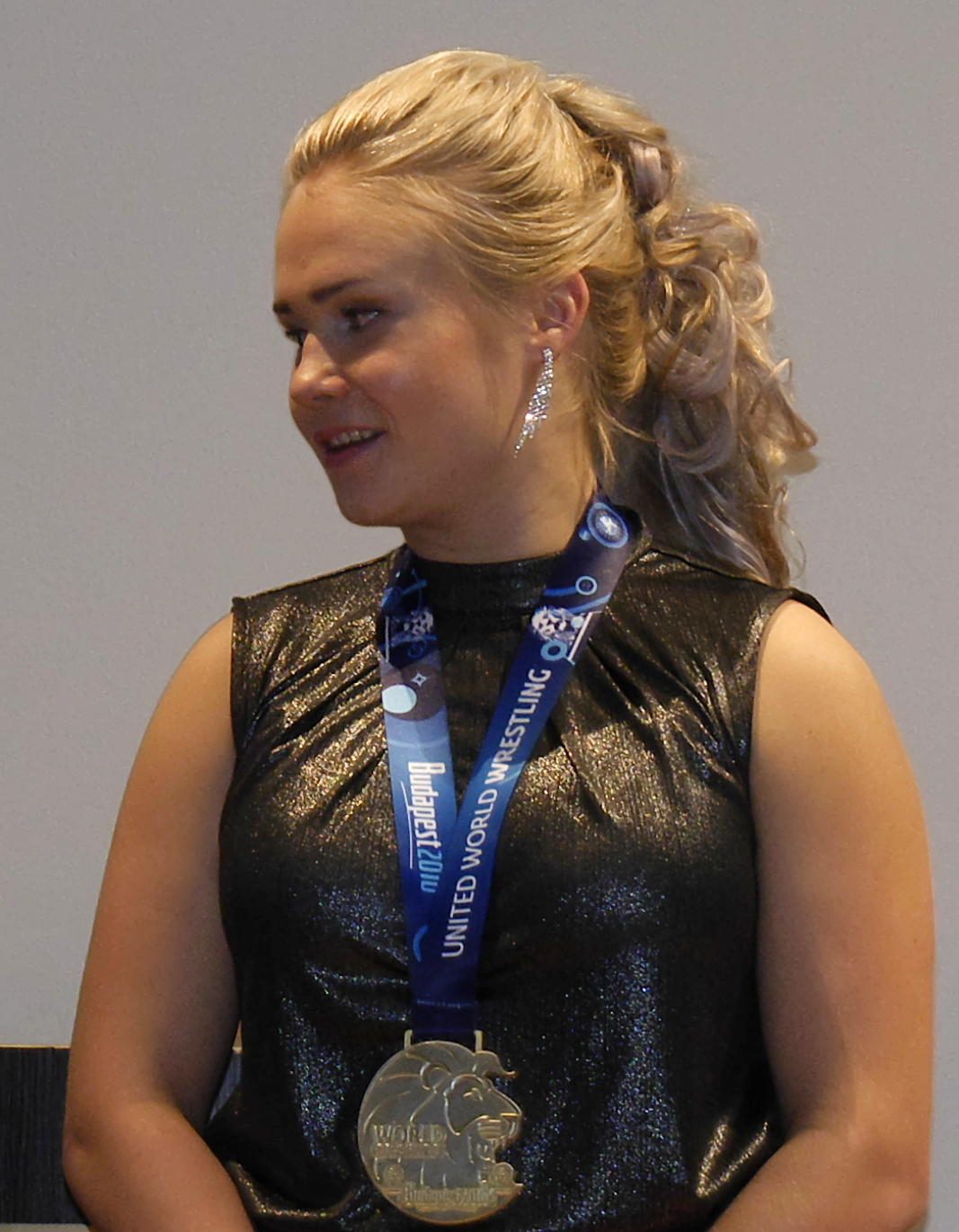
- Petra Olli in 2018

Personal information
- Full name: Petra Maarit Olli
- Nationality: Finnish
- Born: 5 June 1994 (age 32) Lappajärvi, Finland
- Height: 1.63 m (5 ft 4 in)

Sport
- Country: Finland
- Sport: Wrestling
- Event: Freestyle
- Club: Lappajärven Veikot
- Coached by: Ahto Raska; Pertti Olli; Maksim Molonov
Medal record
Women's freestyle wrestling
Representing Finland
World Championships
Gold medal – first place	2018 Budapest	65 kg
Silver medal – second place	2015 Las Vegas	58 kg
European Championships
Gold medal – first place	2016 Riga	60 kg
Gold medal – first place	2018 Kaspiysk	65 kg
Bronze medal – third place	2014 Vantaa	58 kg
Bronze medal – third place	2019 Bucharest	65 kg
Youth Olympic Games
Bronze medal – third place	2010 Singapore	46 kg

Petra Maarit Olli (born 5 June 1994) is a retired Finnish freestyle wrestler. She won the silver medal at the 2015 World Wrestling Championships in the Women's freestyle 58 kg-event. In March 2016 Olli won her first European Championship gold medal at the Senior-level in Riga, Latvia, defeating Oksana Herhel of Ukraine.

She was the first Finnish woman to win a World gold, defeating Danielle Lappage of Canada in the finals of the 2018 World Wrestling Championships in Budapest, Hungary.

Olli missed the 2019 World Wrestling Championships due to health problems. She retired from wrestling in 2020.
