= Svetlana Lipatova =

Russian wrestler (born 1993)

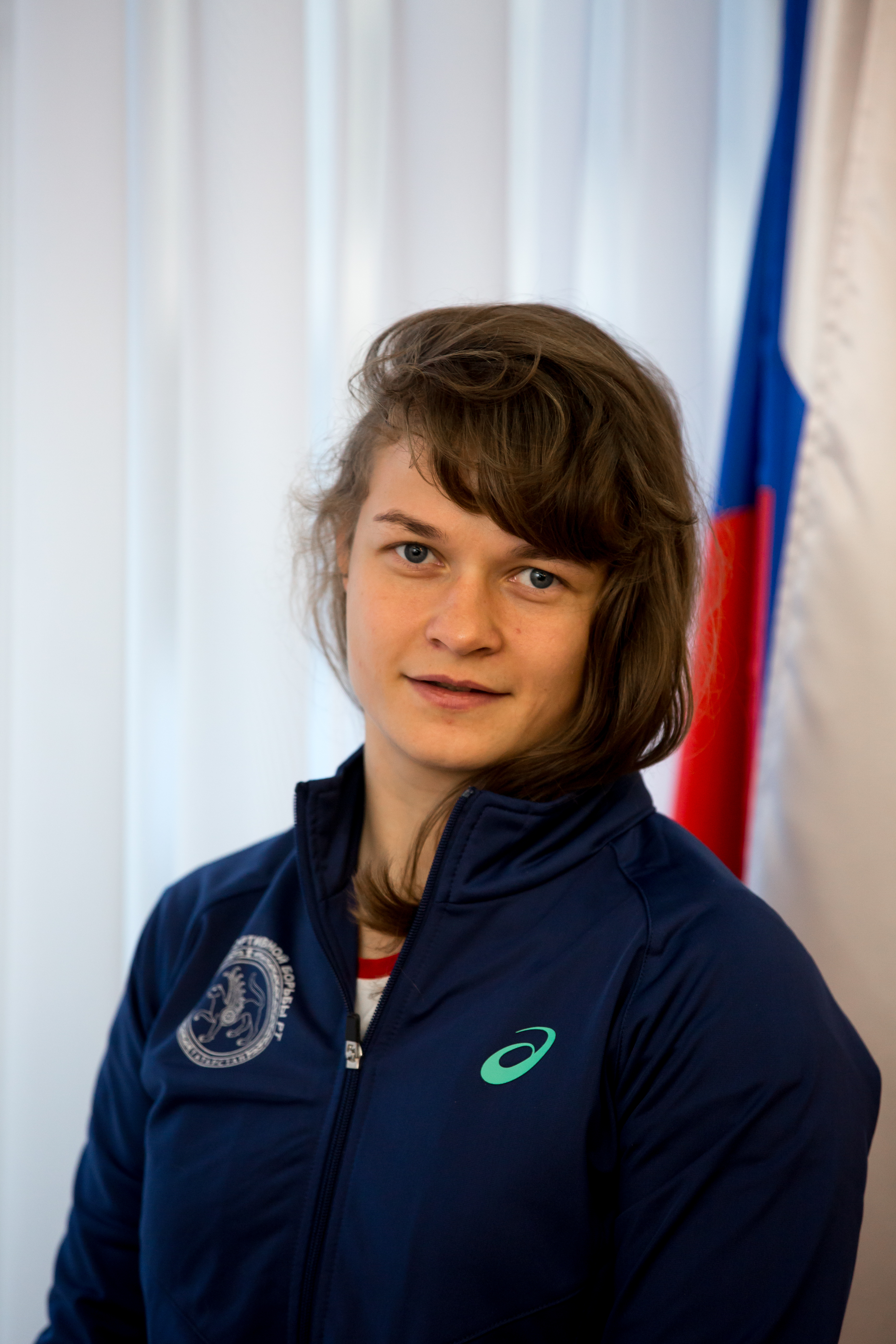
- Svetlana Lipatova in 2018

Personal information
- Full name: Svetlana Aleksandrovna Lipatova
- Nationality: Russian
- Born: 19 February 1993 (age 33) Kazan, Russia

Sport
- Country: Russia
Medal record
Women's freestyle wrestling
Representing Russia
European Championships
Silver medal – second place	2019 Bucharest	62 kg
Bronze medal – third place	2018 Kaspiysk	59 kg
Individual World Cup
Gold medal – first place	2020 Belgrade	59 kg
European Games
Silver medal – second place	2015 Baku	60 kg
Golden Grand Prix Ivan Yarygin
Bronze medal – third place	2016 Krasnoyarsk	60 kg
Silver medal – second place	2015 Krasnoyarsk	60 kg
Silver medal – second place	2019 Krasnoyarsk	59 kg
Yasar Dogu Tournament
Bronze medal – third place	2022 Istanbul	62 kg
Youth Olympic Games
Bronze medal – third place	2010 Singapore	60 kg

Svetlana Aleksandrovna Lipatova (Russian: Светлана Александровна Липатова; born 19 February 1993 in Kazan) is a Russian wrestler who participated at the 2010 Summer Youth Olympics in Singapore. She won the bronze medal in the girls' freestyle 60 kg event, defeating Ahmed Dzhanan of Bulgaria in the bronze medal match. She is runner-up 2015 European Games in 60 kg.

In 2020, she won the gold medal in the women's 59 kg event at the Individual Wrestling World Cup held in Belgrade, Serbia. In 2021, she was eliminated in her first match in the women's 59 kg event at the 2021 World Wrestling Championships held in Oslo, Norway.

In 2022, she competed at the Yasar Dogu Tournament held in Istanbul, Turkey.
