= Elif Jale Yeşilırmak =

Russian-Turkish wrestler

Personal information
- Nationality: Turkish; Russian
- Born: Yulia Guramievna Rekvava; July 30, 1986 (age 40) Smolensk, Russia
- Height: 164 cm (5 ft 5 in)
- Weight: 58 kg (128 lb)

Sport
- Sport: Women's freestyle wrestling
- Event: 63 kg
- Club: Trakya Birlik SK, Edirne
- Turned pro: 2009
- Retired: 2021
Medal record
Women's freestyle wrestling
Representing Turkey
World Championships
Silver medal – second place	2018 Budapest	59 kg
Bronze medal – third place	2014 Tashkent	58 kg
Bronze medal – third place	2015 Las Vegas	58 kg
European Championships
Gold medal – first place	2018 Kaspiysk	59 kg
Bronze medal – third place	2012 Belgrade	63 kg
Bronze medal – third place	2019 Bucharest	62 kg
European Games
Bronze medal – third place	2015 Baku	58 kg
Mediterranean Games
Gold medal – first place	2013 Mersin	63 kg
Gold medal – first place	2018 Tarragona	62 kg
Yasar Dogu Tournament
Bronze medal – third place	2020 Istanbul	62 kg
Dan Kolov - Nikola Petrov Tournament
Gold medal – first place	2014 Sofia	58 kg
Gold medal – first place	2015 Sofia	60 kg
Bronze medal – third place	2018 Sofia	59 kg
Klippan Lady Open
Silver medal – second place	2009 Klippan	59 kg
Silver medal – second place	2012 Klippan	67 kg
Silver medal – second place	2013 Klippan	63 kg
Bronze medal – third place	2018 Klippan	59 kg
Grand Prix of Germany
Gold medal – first place	2013 Dormagen	63 kg
Representing Russia
European Championships
Bronze medal – third place	2009 Vilnius	59 kg

Elif Jale Yeşilırmak, née Yulia Guramievna Rekvava (Russian: Юлия Гурамиевна Реквава), (born July 30, 1986, in Smolensk, Russia) is a former Russian-Turkish female wrestler. She is the first woman wrestler to represent Turkey at the Olympics. She is a member of Trakya Birlikspor.

Born on July 30, 1986, in Russia, Yulia Rekvava won the bronze medal for her native country in the 59 kg division at the 2009 European Wrestling Championships held in Vilnius, Lithuania.

She later moved from Sweden to Turkey, and was naturalized shortly before the 2011 World Wrestling Championships in Istanbul converting to Islam and taking the Turkish name Elif Jale Yeşilırmak.

Yeşilırmak became silver medalist in the 67 kg division at the Golden Grand Prix held in February 2012 at Klippan, Sweden. She won the bronze medal in the 63 kg division at the 2012 European Wrestling Championships held in Belgrade, Serbia. She became so the second woman wrestler from Turkey to win a medal at the European level after twelve years. She qualified for the 2012 Summer Olympics after winning her matches with rivals from India, Bulgaria, Azerbaijan and France in the 65 kg division at the World Qualification Tournament held in Taiyuan, China.

She won the gold medal in the 67 kg division at the 2013 Mediterranean Games held in Mersin, Turkey. In March 2021, she competed at the European Qualification Tournament in Budapest, Hungary hoping to qualify for the 2020 Summer Olympics in Tokyo, Japan.
