= Spartak (Ukraine) =

Ukrainian sports association

Spartak - Ukraine is a physical culture and sports association of Ukraine. It was revived in Zhytomyr in January 1992. Established in 1936 as the All-Union volunteer sports society, Spartak - Ukraine traces its history back to 1923 when it was known as the Komsomol sports society Spartak.

== History ==
At the end of eighties (1987) the former sports associations of trade unions "Avanhard", "Burevestnik", "Vodnik", "Zenit", "Kolos", "Lokomotiv", and "Spartak" were united into the All-Union volunteer physical culture and sports association of trade unions (VDFSTP). After several years "Kolos" has separated from it and in 1991 VDFSTP was reorganized into the sports association of trade unions "Ukraine".
