= Mallory Velte =

American freestyle wrestler

Personal information
- Full name: Mallory Maxine Velte
- Born: March 4, 1995 (age 31)
- Education: Simon Fraser University
- Height: 160 cm (5 ft 3 in)

Sport
- Country: United States
- Sport: Amateur wrestling
- Weight class: 62 kg; 65 kg
- Event: Freestyle
Medal record
Women's freestyle wrestling
Representing United States
World Championships
Bronze medal – third place	2018 Budapest	62 kg
Bronze medal – third place	2022 Belgrade	65 kg
Pan American Championships
Gold medal – first place	2020 Ottawa	62 kg
Gold medal – first place	2023 Buenos Aires	65 kg
Silver medal – second place	2019 Buenos Aires	62 kg
Yasar Dogu Tournament
Silver medal – second place	2022 Istanbul	65 kg

Mallory Maxine Velte (born March 4, 1995) is an American freestyle wrestler. She is a two-time bronze medalist at the World Wrestling Championships.

== Career ==
Velte won one of the bronze medals in the 62 kg event at the 2018 World Wrestling Championships held in Budapest, Hungary.

In 2020, Velte won the gold medal in the 62 kg event at the Pan American Wrestling Championships held in Ottawa, Canada. In the final, she defeated Laís Nunes of Brazil.

In 2022, she won the silver medal in the 65 kg event at the Dan Kolov & Nikola Petrov Tournament held in Veliko Tarnovo, Bulgaria. She also won the silver medal in the 65 kg event at the Yasar Dogu Tournament held in Istanbul, Turkey. She won one of the bronze medals in the 65 kg event at the 2022 World Wrestling Championships held in Belgrade, Serbia.

== Achievements ==
Year	Tournament	Location	Result	Event
2018	World Championships	Budapest, Hungary	3rd	Freestyle 62 kg
2019	Pan American Wrestling Championships	Buenos Aires, Argentina	2nd	Freestyle 62 kg
2020	Pan American Wrestling Championships	Ottawa, Canada	1st	Freestyle 62 kg
2022	World Championships	Belgrade, Serbia	3rd	Freestyle 65 kg
2023	Pan American Wrestling Championships	Buenos Aires, Argentina	1st	Freestyle 65 kg
