= Ulyukchikan =

Ulyukchikan Улюкчикан
- Ulus
- Location within Republic of Buryatia Location within Russia
- Coordinates: 53°52′N 109°57′E
- Country: Russia
- Region: Republic of Buryatia
- District: Barguzinsky District
- Time zone: UTC+8:00

Ulyukchikan (Russian: Улюкчикан) is a rural locality (an ulus) in Barguzinsky District, Republic of Buryatia, Russia. The population was 446 as of 2010. There are 7 streets.

== Geography ==
Ulyukchikan is located 38 km northeast of Barguzin (the district's administrative centre) by road. Ulyun is the nearest rural locality.
