= Tetiana Omelchenko =

Azerbaijani freestyle wrestler

Tetiana Omelchenko Татьяна Омельченко
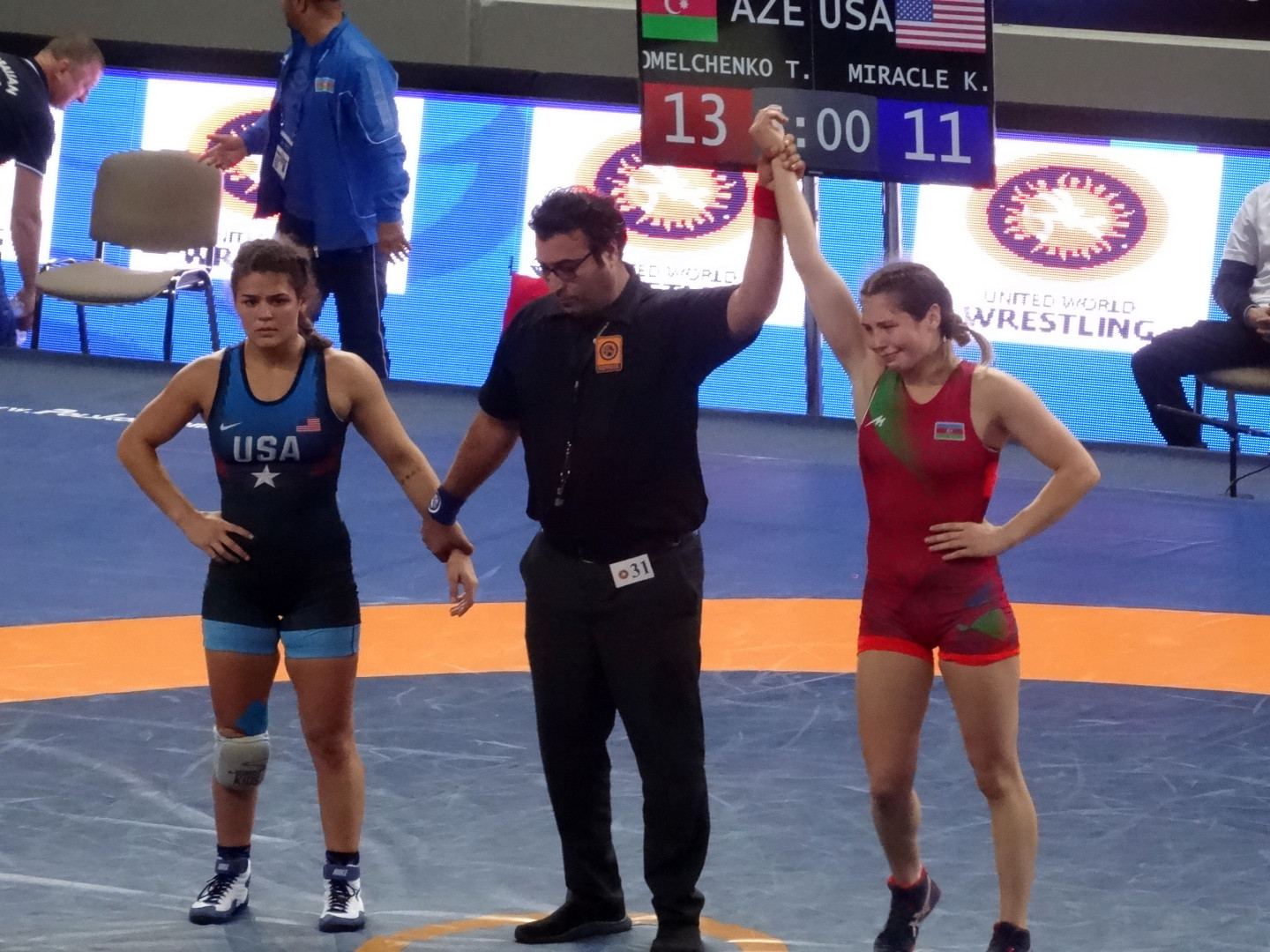
- Omelchenko (in red) in 2024

Personal information
- Full name: Tetiana Sergeevna Omelchenko
- Nationality: Ukrainian; Azerbaijani
- Born: Kryvyi Rih, Ukraine

Sport
- Country: Ukraine (2007–2016); Azerbaijan (since 2016)
- Sport: Amateur wrestling
- Event: Freestyle
- Coached by: Grigorii Schepelev
Medal record
Women's freestyle wrestling
Representing Azerbaijan
European Championships
Bronze medal – third place	2017 Novi Sad	60 kg
Bronze medal – third place	2018 Kaspiysk	59 kg
Bronze medal – third place	2019 Bucharest	62 kg
Bronze medal – third place	2020 Rome	62 kg
Islamic Solidarity Games
Gold medal – first place	2017 Baku	60 kg
Bronze medal – third place	2021 Konya	62 kg
World U23 Championships
Bronze medal – third place	2017 Bydgoszcz	60 kg

Tetiana Sergeevna Omelchenko is a Ukrainian-Azerbaijani freestyle wrestler. She won the gold medal in the women's 60 kg event at the 2017 Islamic Solidarity Games in Baku, Azerbaijan. She also won a bronze medal at the European Wrestling Championships in four consecutive years: 2017, 2018, 2019 and 2020.

== Career ==
In 2016, Omelchenko competed in the women's freestyle 60 kg at the World Wrestling Championships where she was eliminated in her only match, against Emese Barka. Barka went on to win one of the bronze medals.

In May 2017, Omelchenko won one of the bronze medals in the women's freestyle 60 kg event at the European Wrestling Championships held in Novi Sad, Serbia. Later that month, she won the gold medal in the 60 kg event at the 2017 Islamic Solidarity Games held in Baku, Azerbaijan.

In 2020, Omelchenko won one of the bronze medals in the 62 kg event at the European Wrestling Championships held in Rome, Italy. In the same year, she competed in the women's 62 kg event at the 2020 Individual Wrestling World Cup held in Belgrade, Serbia. In March 2021, Omelchenko competed at the European Qualification Tournament in Budapest, Hungary hoping to qualify for the 2020 Summer Olympics in Tokyo, Japan. She lost her first match against Anastasija Grigorjeva of Latvia which meant that she could no longer qualify for the Olympics at this tournament. She also failed to qualify for the Olympics at the World Olympic Qualification Tournament held in Sofia, Bulgaria.

Omelchenko won one of the bronze medals in the 62 kg event at the 2021 Islamic Solidarity Games held in Konya, Turkey. She competed in the 62 kg event at the 2022 World Wrestling Championships held in Belgrade, Serbia. She was eliminated in the repechage by eventual bronze medalist Luo Xiaojuan of China.

== Achievements ==
Year	Tournament	Location	Result	Event
2017	European Championships	Novi Sad, Serbia	3rd	Freestyle 60 kg
2017	Islamic Solidarity Games	Baku, Azerbaijan	1st	Freestyle 60 kg
2018	European Championships	Kaspiysk, Russia	3rd	Freestyle 59 kg
2019	European Championships	Bucharest, Romania	3rd	Freestyle 62 kg
2020	European Championships	Rome, Italy	3rd	Freestyle 62 kg
2022	Islamic Solidarity Games	Konya, Turkey	3rd	Freestyle 62 kg
