= Tetyana Lavrenchuk =

Ukrainian freestyle wrestler

Medal record

Women's freestyle wrestling

Representing Ukraine

European Games
Silver medal – second place	2015 Baku	58 kg

European Championships
Bronze medal – third place	2013 Tbilisi	59 kg

Tetyana Lavrenchuk (Ukrainian: Тетяна Лавренчук, born March 3, 1993, in Lviv) is a Ukrainian freestyle wrestler of Dinamo and Spartak sports clubs. She was silver medalist of the 2015 European Games and bronze medalist of the 2013 European Championships.

In 2014, Lavrenchuk competed against Jacarra Winchester of the USA in the 58 kg category at the Women's Freestyle University World Championships.
