= Ilona Prokopevniuk =

Ukrainian freestyle wrestler

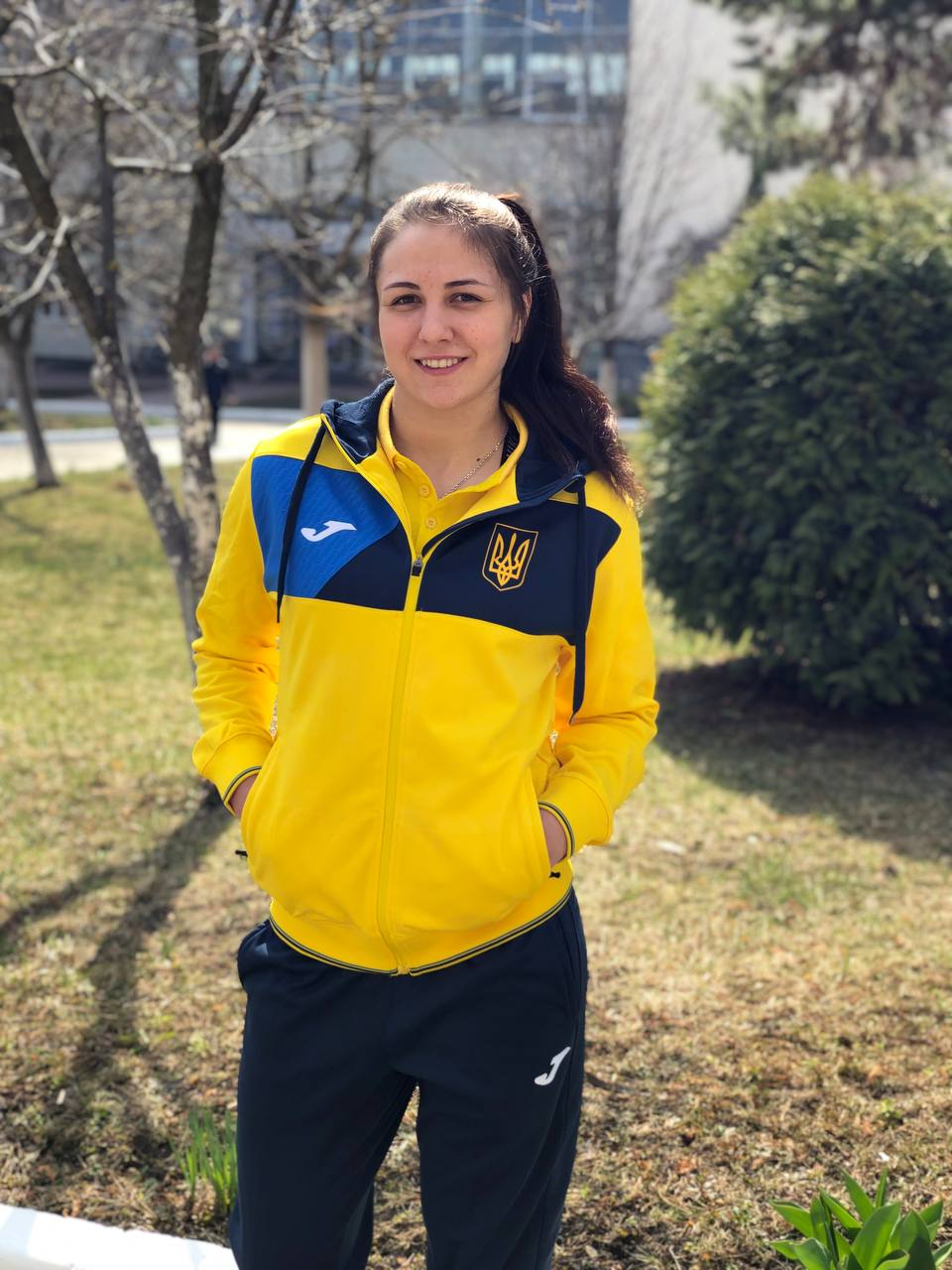

Personal information
- Native name: Ілона Прокопевнюк
- Nationality: Ukraine
- Born: 29 October 1997 (age 28) Velyka Oleksandrivka, Ukraine
- Height: 168 cm (5 ft 6 in)

Sport
- Country: Ukraine
- Sport: Amateur wrestling
- Weight class: 62 kg
- Event: Freestyle
Medal record
Women's freestyle wrestling
Representing Ukraine
World Championships
Bronze medal – third place	2022 Belgrade	62 kg
Individual World Cup
Bronze medal – third place	2020 Belgrade	62 kg
European Championships
Bronze medal – third place	2018 Kaspiysk	62 kg
Bronze medal – third place	2022 Budapest	62 kg
World U23 Championships
Bronze medal – third place	2019 Budapest	62 kg
Silver medal – second place	2018 Bucharest	62 kg
Silver medal – second place	2017 Bydgoszcz	60 kg
European U23 Championships
Gold medal – first place	2018 Istanbul	62 kg

Ilona Prokopevniuk (Ukrainian: Ілона Прокопевнюк) is a Ukrainian freestyle wrestler. She won one of the bronze medals in the 62 kg event at the 2022 World Wrestling Championships held in Belgrade, Serbia. She is a two-time bronze medalist at the European Wrestling Championships.

== Career ==
Prokopevniuk became silver medalist at the inaugural World U23 Championships in 2017. Next year she achieved her first podium rank at the senior competition becoming third at the 2018 European Championships.

In 2020, she won one of the bronze medals in the women's 62 kg event at the Individual Wrestling World Cup held in Belgrade, Serbia. In June 2021, she won one of the bronze medals in her event at the 2021 Poland Open held in Warsaw, Poland. In October 2021, she lost her bronze medal match in the 62 kg event at the World Wrestling Championships held in Oslo, Norway.

In April 2022, she won one of the bronze medals in the 62 kg event at the European Wrestling Championships held in Budapest, Hungary. A few months later, she won the silver medal in her event at the Matteo Pellicone Ranking Series 2022 held in Rome, Italy.

== Achievements ==
Year	Tournament	Location	Result	Event
2018	European Championships	Kaspiysk, Russia	3rd	Freestyle 62 kg
2022	European Championships	Budapest, Hungary	3rd	Freestyle 62 kg
2022	World Championships	Belgrade, Serbia	3rd	Freestyle 62 kg
