= Inna Trazhukova =

Russian wrestler (born 1990)

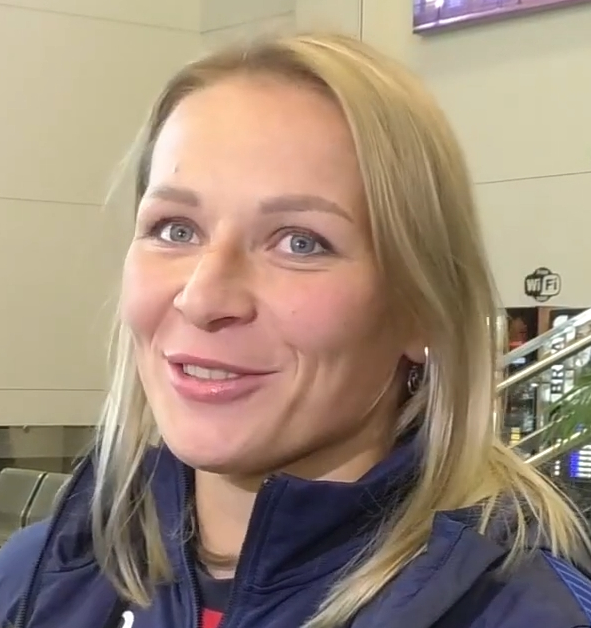
- Inna Trazhukova in September 2019

Personal information
- Nationality: Russian
- Born: 11 September 1990 (age 35) Verkhniye Timersyany, Tsilninsky District, Ulyanovsk Oblast, Russia
- Height: 1.70 m (5 ft 7 in)
- Weight: 63 kg (139 lb)

Sport
- Country: Russia
- Sport: Wrestling
- Event: Freestyle
Medal record
Women's freestyle wrestling
Representing Russia
World Championships
Gold medal – first place	2019 Nur-Sultan	65 kg
World Cup
Silver medal – second place	2015 St.Petersburg	63 kg
European Championships
Silver medal – second place	2018 Kaspiysk	62 kg
Silver medal – second place	2020 Rome	62 kg
Bronze medal – third place	2011 Dortmund	63 kg
Bronze medal – third place	2016 Riga	63 kg
European Nations Cup
Gold medal – first place	2014 Moscow	63 kg
Gold medal – first place	2013 Moscow	63 kg
Bronze medal – third place	2012 Moscow	63 kg
Golden Grand Prix Ivan Yarygin
Gold medal – first place	2016 Krasnoyarsk	63 kg
Silver medal – second place	2011 Krasnoyarsk	63 kg
Silver medal – second place	2015 Krasnoyarsk	63 kg
Silver medal – second place	2017 Krasnoyarsk	63 kg
Bronze medal – third place	2013 Krasnoyarsk	63 kg
Bronze medal – third place	2014 Krasnoyarsk	63 kg

Inna Vyacheslavovna Trazhukova (Russian: Инна Вячеславовна Тражукова; born 11 September 1990) is a Russian wrestler, World champion 2019. She represented her country at the 2016 Summer Olympics where she lost the bronze medal match against Polish wrestler Monika Michalik.

She claimed that Mikhail Mamiashvili, the president of the Wrestling Federation of Russia, hit her twice in the face for losing the bronze medal match. Mamiashvili did not deny the attack but said that he punished her for not making enough effort to win the match.

Trazhukova is the 2011 European bronze medalist and two-time Russian national champion (2015, 2016). She won the gold medal at the 2019 World Wrestling Championships in Kazakhstan.
