= Oksana Kukhta =

Ukrainian freestyle wrestler

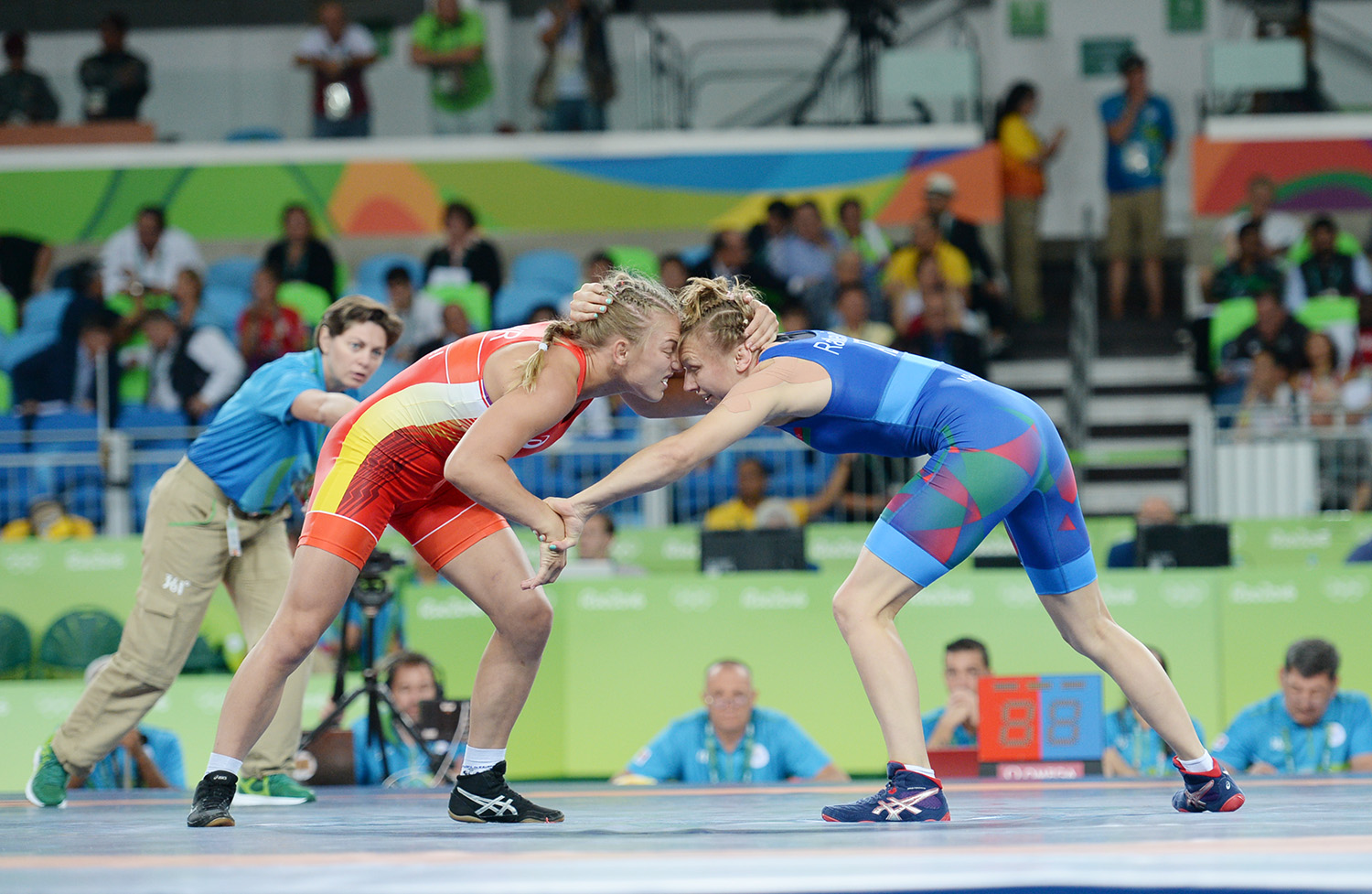
- Herhel (left) against Yuliya Ratkevich during the 2016 Olympics

Medal record

Women's freestyle wrestling

Representing Ukraine

World Championships
Gold medal – first place	2015 Las Vegas	60 kg

European Championships
Silver medal – second place	2016 Riga	60 kg

Oksana Kukhta (Ukrainian: Оксана Кухта, née Herhel (Гергель), born 20 June 1994 in Ivanychi) is a Ukrainian freestyle wrestler of Spartak sports club.

== Career ==
She is 2015 World Champion and silver medalist of the European Championships 2016.

In May 2016, she was provisionally suspended due to use of meldonium. Later that decision was reverted.
