= 2019 European Wrestling Championships =

2019 European Championship
- Host city: Bucharest, Romania
- Dates: 8–14 April
- Stadium: Polyvalent Hall

Champions
- Freestyle: Russia
- Greco-Roman: Russia
- Women: Ukraine

The 70th UWW European Wrestling Championships was held in Bucharest, Romania, between 8 and 14 April 2019.

== Medal table ==
* Host nation ( Romania)

Rank	Nation	Gold	Silver	Bronze	Total
1	Russia (RUS)	8	4	9	21
2	Turkey (TUR)	6	2	8	16
3	Ukraine (UKR)	5	2	3	10
4	Azerbaijan (AZE)	4	2	7	13
5	Bulgaria (BUL)	2	3	1	6
6	Italy (ITA)	1	1	1	3
6	Moldova (MDA)	1	1	1	3
8	Hungary (HUN)	1	0	4	5
9	Armenia (ARM)	1	0	2	3
10	Denmark (DEN)	1	0	0	1
11	Georgia (GEO)	0	4	5	9
12	Germany (GER)	0	2	3	5
13	Romania (ROU)*	0	2	2	4
14	Poland (POL)	0	2	1	3
15	Belarus (BLR)	0	1	3	4
16	Austria (AUT)	0	1	0	1
16	Czech Republic (CZE)	0	1	0	1
16	France (FRA)	0	1	0	1
16	Norway (NOR)	0	1	0	1
20	Finland (FIN)	0	0	2	2
21	Croatia (CRO)	0	0	1	1
21	Latvia (LAT)	0	0	1	1
21	Netherlands (NED)	0	0	1	1
21	North Macedonia (NMK)	0	0	1	1
21	Serbia (SRB)	0	0	1	1
21	Sweden (SWE)	0	0	1	1
21	Switzerland (SUI)	0	0	1	1
Totals (27 entries)		30	30	59	119

=== Team ranking ===
Rank	Men's freestyle		Men's Greco-Roman		Women's freestyle	
Rank	Team	Points	Team	Points	Team	Points
1	Russia	162	Russia	192	Ukraine	135
2	Turkey	156	Turkey	132	Bulgaria	110
3	Azerbaijan	145	Azerbaijan	76	Turkey	78
4	Georgia	104	Germany	72	Azerbaijan	71
5	Ukraine	80	Georgia	71	Hungary	67
6	Belarus	65	Ukraine	62	Russia	59
7	Poland	55	Romania	61	Belarus	50
8	Moldova	52	Armenia	60	Italy	36
9	Romania	52	Bulgaria	51	Sweden	35
10	Armenia	37	Poland	48	Romania	35

== Medal overview ==
=== Men's freestyle ===
Event	Gold	Silver	Bronze
57 kg	Süleyman Atlı; Turkey	Muslim Sadulaev; Russia	Mahir Amiraslanov; Azerbaijan
57 kg	Süleyman Atlı; Turkey	Muslim Sadulaev; Russia	Vladimir Egorov; North Macedonia
61 kg	Arsen Harutyunyan; Armenia	Beka Lomtadze; Georgia	Randy Vock; Switzerland
61 kg	Arsen Harutyunyan; Armenia	Beka Lomtadze; Georgia	Recep Topal; Turkey
65 kg	Haji Aliyev; Azerbaijan	Selahattin Kılıçsallayan; Turkey	Nachyn Kuular; Russia
65 kg	Haji Aliyev; Azerbaijan	Selahattin Kılıçsallayan; Turkey	Vasyl Shuptar; Ukraine
70 kg	Mustafa Kaya; Turkey	Aghahuseyn Mustafayev; Azerbaijan	Magomedmurad Gadzhiev; Poland
70 kg	Mustafa Kaya; Turkey	Aghahuseyn Mustafayev; Azerbaijan	Magomedrasul Gazimagomedov; Russia
74 kg	Frank Chamizo; Italy	Zelimkhan Khadjiev; France	Timur Bizhoev; Russia
74 kg	Frank Chamizo; Italy	Zelimkhan Khadjiev; France	Avtandil Kentchadze; Georgia
79 kg	Jabrayil Hasanov; Azerbaijan	Akhmed Gadzhimagomedov; Russia	Nika Kentchadze; Georgia
79 kg	Jabrayil Hasanov; Azerbaijan	Akhmed Gadzhimagomedov; Russia	Muhammet Nuri Kotanoğlu; Turkey
86 kg	Vladislav Valiev; Russia	Piotr Ianulov; Moldova	Fatih Erdin; Turkey
86 kg	Vladislav Valiev; Russia	Piotr Ianulov; Moldova	Ali Shabanau; Belarus
92 kg	Sharif Sharifov; Azerbaijan	Zbigniew Baranowski; Poland	Irakli Mtsituri; Georgia
92 kg	Sharif Sharifov; Azerbaijan	Zbigniew Baranowski; Poland	István Veréb; Hungary
97 kg	Abdulrashid Sadulaev; Russia	Aliaksandr Hushtyn; Belarus	Elizbar Odikadze; Georgia
97 kg	Abdulrashid Sadulaev; Russia	Aliaksandr Hushtyn; Belarus	Nurmagomed Gadzhiev; Azerbaijan
125 kg	Taha Akgül; Turkey	Geno Petriashvili; Georgia	Anzor Khizriev; Russia
125 kg	Taha Akgül; Turkey	Geno Petriashvili; Georgia	Oleksandr Khotsianivskyi; Ukraine

=== Men's Greco-Roman ===
Event	Gold	Silver	Bronze
55 kg	Vitalii Kabaloev; Russia	Florin Tița; Romania	Fabian Schmitt; Germany
55 kg	Vitalii Kabaloev; Russia	Florin Tița; Romania	Eldaniz Azizli; Azerbaijan
60 kg	Victor Ciobanu; Moldova	Sergey Emelin; Russia	Lenur Temirov; Ukraine
60 kg	Victor Ciobanu; Moldova	Sergey Emelin; Russia	Kerem Kamal; Turkey
63 kg	Stepan Maryanyan; Russia	Stig-André Berge; Norway	Levani Kavjaradze; Georgia
63 kg	Stepan Maryanyan; Russia	Stig-André Berge; Norway	Taleh Mammadov; Azerbaijan
67 kg	Atakan Yüksel; Turkey	Gevorg Sahakyan; Poland	Karen Aslanyan; Armenia
67 kg	Atakan Yüksel; Turkey	Gevorg Sahakyan; Poland	Artem Surkov; Russia
72 kg	Abuyazid Mantsigov; Russia	Cengiz Arslan; Turkey	Aik Mnatsakanian; Bulgaria
72 kg	Abuyazid Mantsigov; Russia	Cengiz Arslan; Turkey	Dominik Etlinger; Croatia
77 kg	Roman Vlasov; Russia	Roland Schwarz; Germany	Viktor Nemeš; Serbia
77 kg	Roman Vlasov; Russia	Roland Schwarz; Germany	Arsen Julfalakyan; Armenia
82 kg	Rajbek Bisultanov; Denmark	Lasha Gobadze; Georgia	Aleksandr Komarov; Russia
82 kg	Rajbek Bisultanov; Denmark	Lasha Gobadze; Georgia	Emrah Kuş; Turkey
87 kg	Zhan Beleniuk; Ukraine	Islam Abbasov; Azerbaijan	Erik Szilvássy; Hungary
87 kg	Zhan Beleniuk; Ukraine	Islam Abbasov; Azerbaijan	Denis Kudla; Germany
97 kg	Musa Evloev; Russia	Kiril Milov; Bulgaria	Daigoro Timoncini; Italy
97 kg	Musa Evloev; Russia	Kiril Milov; Bulgaria	Elias Kuosmanen; Finland
130 kg	Rıza Kayaalp; Turkey	Iakob Kajaia; Georgia	Sergey Semenov; Russia
130 kg	Rıza Kayaalp; Turkey	Iakob Kajaia; Georgia	Alin Alexuc-Ciurariu; Romania

=== Women's freestyle ===
Event	Gold	Silver	Bronze
50 kg	Oksana Livach; Ukraine	Miglena Selishka; Bulgaria	Evin Demirhan; Turkey
50 kg	Oksana Livach; Ukraine	Miglena Selishka; Bulgaria	Kseniya Stankevich; Belarus
53 kg	Stalvira Orshush; Russia	Lilya Horishna; Ukraine	Jessica Blaszka; Netherlands
53 kg	Stalvira Orshush; Russia	Lilya Horishna; Ukraine	Vanesa Kaladzinskaya; Belarus
55 kg	Iryna Husyak; Ukraine	Evelina Nikolova; Bulgaria	Bediha Gün; Turkey
55 kg	Iryna Husyak; Ukraine	Evelina Nikolova; Bulgaria	Andreea Ana; Romania
57 kg	Emese Barka; Hungary	Tetyana Kit; Ukraine	Alyona Kolesnik; Azerbaijan
57 kg	Emese Barka; Hungary	Tetyana Kit; Ukraine	Anastasia Nichita; Moldova
59 kg	Bilyana Dudova; Bulgaria	Svetlana Lipatova; Russia	Elmira Gambarova; Azerbaijan
59 kg	Bilyana Dudova; Bulgaria	Svetlana Lipatova; Russia	Elif Jale Yeşilırmak; Turkey
62 kg	Taybe Yusein; Bulgaria	Aurora Campagna; Italy	Tetiana Omelchenko; Azerbaijan
62 kg	Taybe Yusein; Bulgaria	Aurora Campagna; Italy	Marianna Sastin; Hungary
65 kg	Elis Manolova; Azerbaijan	Kriszta Incze; Romania	Maria Kuznetsova; Russia
65 kg	Elis Manolova; Azerbaijan	Kriszta Incze; Romania	Petra Olli; Finland
68 kg	Alla Cherkasova; Ukraine	Adéla Hanzlíčková; Czech Republic	Anastasija Grigorjeva; Latvia
68 kg	Alla Cherkasova; Ukraine	Adéla Hanzlíčková; Czech Republic	Jenny Fransson; Sweden
72 kg	Alina Berezhna; Ukraine	Anna Schell; Germany	Tatiana Kolesnikova; Russia
76 kg	Yasemin Adar; Turkey	Martina Kuenz; Austria	Zsanett Németh; Hungary
76 kg	Yasemin Adar; Turkey	Martina Kuenz; Austria	Aline Rotter-Focken; Germany

== Participating nations ==
515 competitors from 40 nations participated:

1. Albania (3)
2. Armenia (19)
3. Austria (12)
4. Azerbaijan (28)
5. Belarus (29)
6. Bulgaria (23)
7. Croatia (6)
8. Cyprus (1)
9. Czech Republic (7)
10. Denmark (2)
11. Spain (9)
12. Estonia (6)
13. Finland (9)
14. France (13)
15. United Kingdom (3)
16. Georgia (21)
17. Germany (24)
18. Greece (13)
19. Hungary (23)
20. Israel (7)
21. Italy (18)
22. Kosovo (2)
23. Latvia (7)
24. Lithuania (13)
25. Moldova (22)
26. North Macedonia (4)
27. Netherlands (3)
28. Norway (10)
29. Poland (21)
30. Portugal (2)
31. Romania (29) (Host)
32. Russia (30)
33. Slovenia (1)
34. San Marino (2)
35. Serbia (7)
36. Switzerland (6)
37. Slovakia (6)
38. Sweden (14)
39. Turkey (30)
40. Ukraine (30)

== See also ==
- List of European Championships medalists in wrestling (freestyle)
- List of European Championships medalists in wrestling (Greco-Roman)
- List of European Championships medalists in wrestling (women)
