= Anastasija Grigorjeva =

Latvian freestyle wrestler (born 1990)

Personal information
- Born: 12 May 1990 (age 36) Daugavpils, Latvia
- Height: 1.70 m (5 ft 7 in)
- Weight: 62 kg (137 lb)

Sport
- Country: Latvia
- Sport: Freestyle wrestling
Medal record
Women's freestyle wrestling
Representing Latvia
World Championships
| Bronze medal – third place | 2014 Tashkent | 63 kg |
| Bronze medal – third place | 2017 Paris | 60 kg |
Individual World Cup
| Silver medal – second place | 2020 Belgrade | 62 kg |
European Games
| Gold medal – first place | 2019 Minsk | 68 kg |
| Bronze medal – third place | 2015 Baku | 63 kg |
European Championships
| Gold medal – first place | 2010 Baku | 55 kg |
| Gold medal – first place | 2013 Tbilisi | 63 kg |
| Gold medal – first place | 2016 Riga | 63 kg |
| Silver medal – second place | 2012 Belgrade | 59 kg |
| Silver medal – second place | 2017 Novi Sad | 60 kg |
| Bronze medal – third place | 2019 Bucharest | 68 kg |
Golded Grand Prix Ivan Yarygin
| Bronze medal – third place | 2015 Krasnoyarsk | 63 kg |

Anastasija Grigorjeva (born 12 May 1990) is a retired Latvian freestyle wrestler, who won gold at the 2010, 2013 and 2016 European Championships. She has also won two bronze medals at World Championship level and won gold at the European Games. She has competed at three Olympics (2012, 2016 and 2020).

== Career ==
Grigorjeva was born in Daugavpils, Latvia.

She started to train in wrestling from the year 2003. She originally trained in judo before switching to freestyle wrestling some years later. She studied at the University of Daugavpils from 2012 onwards.

Grigorjeva had sporting success from a young age: she was the silver medalist at the European Championship for cadets in 2007, the winner of the European Championship for juniors in 2008 and silver medalist of the World and European Championship for juniors.

She won European Championships 2010 (Women's freestyle – 55 kg) and won silver in 2012 (Women's freestyle – 59 kg).

She qualified for the 2012 Summer Olympics in London. At these Games, she exited in the quarterfinals and achieved 9th place. After the 2012 Olympic Games she competed successfully in tournaments, winning 16 consecutive victories, the third longest series of victory between FILA elite wrestlers.

In 2013 she won the title of European Champion for a second time, this time in the -63 kg weight category and she was named the sportswoman of the year in Latvia. By March 2014 she was number 1 ranked in the world, and in April she won her third gold medal at the European Championship. That year, Grigorjeva won a bronze medal at the World Championship. In 2014 she was again named Latvian sportswoman of the year.

In June 2015, she competed in the inaugural European Games, for Latvia in wrestling in the women's freestyle -63 kg division. She earned a bronze medal.

She qualified for the 2016 Summer Olympics, but was again knocked out in the quarterfinals. This time she was entered into the bronze medal repechage, but lost to eventual bronze medalist Monika Michalik.

In 2020, she won the silver medal in the women's 62 kg event at the 2020 Individual Wrestling World Cup held in Belgrade, Serbia. In March 2021, she qualified at the European Qualification Tournament to compete at the 2020 Summer Olympics in Tokyo, Japan. She lost her bronze medal match in the women's freestyle 62 kg event.

Grigorjeva competed at the 2024 European Wrestling Olympic Qualification Tournament in Baku, Azerbaijan hoping to qualify for the 2024 Summer Olympics in Paris, France. She was eliminated in her second match and she did not qualify for the Olympics. Grigorjeva also competed at the 2024 World Wrestling Olympic Qualification Tournament held in Istanbul, Turkey without qualifying for the Olympics. She was eliminated in her first match.

Awards
| Preceded by Ineta Radēviča | Latvian Sportspersonality of the Year; 2013, 2014 | Succeeded by Laura Ikauniece-Admidiņa |
