= Yuliya Tkach =

Ukrainian freestyle wrestler

Personal information
- Native name: Юлія Анатоліївна Ткач
- Full name: Yuliya Anatoliyivna Tkach
- Born: 26 September 1989 (age 36) Kovel, Ukrainian SSR, Soviet Union
Medal record
Women's freestyle wrestling
Representing Ukraine
World Championships
| Gold medal – first place | 2014 Tashkent | 63 kg |
| Silver medal – second place | 2017 Paris | 63 kg |
| Silver medal – second place | 2023 Belgrade | 59 kg |
| Bronze medal – third place | 2015 Las Vegas | 63 kg |
| Bronze medal – third place | 2018 Budapest | 62 kg |
European Championships
| Gold medal – first place | 2011 Dortmund | 63 kg |
| Gold medal – first place | 2012 Belgrad | 63 kg |
| Gold medal – first place | 2020 Rome | 62 kg |
| Silver medal – second place | 2016 Riga | 63 kg |
| Silver medal – second place | 2023 Zagreb | 59 kg |
| Bronze medal – third place | 2010 Baku | 63 kg |
| Bronze medal – third place | 2014 Vantaa | 63 kg |
| Bronze medal – third place | 2017 Novi Sad | 63 kg |
| Bronze medal – third place | 2024 Bucharest | 62 kg |
European Games
| Gold medal – first place | 2019 Minsk | 62 kg |
| Silver medal – second place | 2015 Baku | 63 kg |

Yuliya Anatoliyivna Tkach, née Ostapchuk, (Ukrainian: Юлія Анатоліївна Ткач (Остапчук); also transliterated Iulia, born 26 September 1989 in Kovel) is a Ukrainian freestyle wrestler. She is a member of Dynamo sports club. World champion in 2014, she competed for Ukraine at the 2008, 2012 and 2016 Summer Olympics.

== Career ==
At the 2008 Summer Olympics, she lost to Randi Miller in her first match.

Tkach competed in the freestyle 63 kg event at the 2012 Summer Olympics; she defeated Yelena Shalygina in the quarterfinals and Marianna Sastin in the 1/8 finals before being eliminated by Lubov Volosova in the quarterfinals.

She returned from a break to start a family to win a bronze medal at the 2014 European Championships before winning the World title later that year.

At the 2016 Olympics, she won her first match Danielle Lappage when Lappage retired injured before losing to Xu Rui in the second round.
