= Hafize Şahin =

Turkish freestyle wrestler

Personal information
- Born: 1 January 1992 (age 34) Manavgat, Antalya, Turkey
- Height: 1.70 m (5 ft 7 in)
- Weight: 63 kg (139 lb)

Sport
- Country: Turkey
- Sport: Wrestling
- Event: Women's freestyle
- Club: Edirne Trakya Birlik SK
- Coached by: Habil Kara
Medal record
Representing Turkey
Women's freestyle wrestling
European Championships
Silver medal – second place	2014 Vantaa	60 kg
Bronze medal – third place	2013 Tbilisi	59 kg
Islamic Solidarity Games
Silver medal – second place	2017 Baku	63 kg
Mediterranean Games
Gold medal – first place	2013 Mersin	59 kg
World University Championships
Bronze medal – third place	2010 Turin	55 kg
Bronze medal – third place	2012 Kuortane	59 kg
Yasar Dogu Tournament
Gold medal – first place	2012 Ankara	59 kg
Gold medal – first place	2016 Istanbul	63 kg
Gold medal – first place	2017 Istanbul	63 kg
European U23 Championships
Bronze medal – third place	2015 Wałbrzych	60 kg
World Junior Championships
Silver medal – second place	2012 Pattaya	59 kg
European Juniors Championships
Silver medal – second place	2010 Samokov	55 kg
Silver medal – second place	2012 Zagreb	59 kg

Hafize Şahin (born 1 January 1992) is a Turkish freestyle wrestler. She won the gold medal in the women's 59 kg event at the 2013 Mediterranean Games, the silver medal in the women's 60 kg event at the 2014 European Wrestling Championships, and the bronze medal in the women's 59 kg event at the 2013 European Wrestling Championships. She represented Turkey at the 2016 Summer Olympics in Rio de Janeiro and finished seventh in the women's freestyle 63 kg event.

== Career ==
Şahin was born in Manavgat, Antalya, and began wrestling in 2004 in Antalya. She later joined Trakya Birlik SK in Edirne, where she worked with coach Habil Kara.

At junior level, she won silver medals at the 2010 European Juniors Wrestling Championships in Samokov and the 2012 European Juniors Wrestling Championships in Zagreb, and took the silver medal at the 2012 World Junior Wrestling Championships in Pattaya. She also won bronze medals at the 2010 World University Wrestling Championships in Turin and the 2012 World University Wrestling Championships in Kuortane.

Her senior breakthrough came in 2013. She won the bronze medal at the 2013 European Wrestling Championships in Tbilisi and later won the gold medal in the women's 59 kg division at the 2013 Mediterranean Games in Mersin.

In 2014, Şahin won the silver medal at the 2014 European Wrestling Championships in Vantaa. She became the first Turkish woman to reach a European Championship final in wrestling and the first to win a silver medal at the tournament.

Şahin competed for Turkey at the 2015 European Games and at the 2016 Summer Olympics. She qualified for Rio by winning the 2016 World Wrestling Olympic Qualification Tournament 1 and finished seventh in the Olympic women's freestyle 63 kg event.

In 2017, she won the silver medal in the women's 63 kg event at the 2017 Islamic Solidarity Games in Baku and placed fifth at the 2017 World Wrestling Championships in Paris.
