= Veranika Ivanova =

Belarusian freestyle wrestler

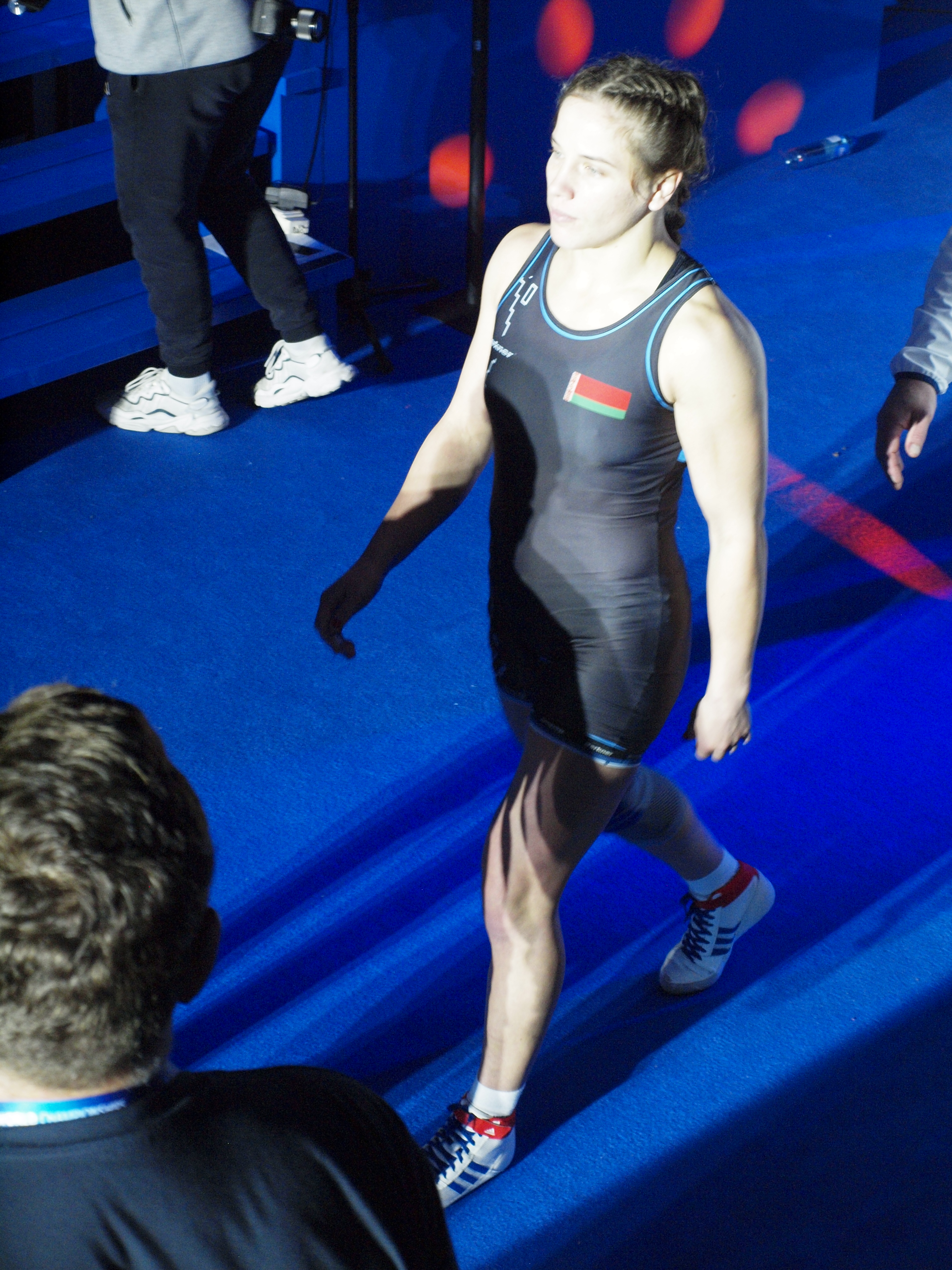
- Veranika Ivanova at the 2021 World Wrestling Championships in Oslo, Norway

Personal information
- Born: 24 September 1996 (age 29)
- Height: 163 cm (5 ft 4 in)

Sport
- Country: Belarus
- Sport: Amateur wrestling
- Weight class: 62 kg
- Event: Freestyle
Medal record
Women's freestyle wrestling
Representing Individual Neutral Athletes
European Championships
Bronze medal – third place	2024 Bucharest	62 kg
Representing Belarus
European Games
Bronze medal – third place	2015 Baku	60 kg
European Championships
Bronze medal – third place	2018 Kaspiysk	62 kg
Bronze medal – third place	2021 Warsaw	62 kg

Veranika Petrovna Ivanova (Belarusian: Вераніка Пятроўна Іванова; born 24 September 1996) is a Belarusian freestyle wrestler. She is a three-time bronze medalist at the European Wrestling Championships. She is also a bronze medalist at the European Games.

== Career ==
Ivanova represented Belarus at the 2015 European Games held in Baku, Azerbaijan and she won one of the bronze medals in the women's freestyle 60 kg event. Ivanova also competed in the women's freestyle 62 kg event at the 2019 European Games in Minsk, Belarus without winning a medal. She was eliminated in her first match by Johanna Mattsson of Sweden.

In 2016, Ivanova won one of the bronze medals in the women's 63 kg event at the World University Wrestling Championships held in Çorum, Turkey.

In 2017, Ivanova competed in the women's freestyle 63 kg event at the European Wrestling Championships held in Novi Sad, Serbia. She was eliminated in her first match by Yuliya Tkach of Ukraine. In 2018, at the European Wrestling Championships held in Kaspiysk, Dagestan, Russia, she won one of the bronze medals in the women's freestyle 62 kg event. Ivanova also won one of the bronze medals in the same event at the 2021 European Wrestling Championships in Warsaw, Poland. Two weeks later, she failed to qualify for the 2020 Summer Olympics at the World Olympic Qualification Tournament held in Sofia, Bulgaria. In October 2021, Ivanova competed in the 62 kg event at the World Wrestling Championships held in Oslo, Norway.

In 2022, Ivanova lost her bronze medal match in her event at the Yasar Dogu Tournament held in Istanbul, Turkey. She won one of the bronze medals in the women's 62 kg event at the 2024 European Wrestling Championships held in Bucharest, Romania. Ivanova competed at the 2024 European Wrestling Olympic Qualification Tournament in Baku, Azerbaijan hoping to qualify for the 2024 Summer Olympics in Paris, France. She was eliminated in her second match and she did not qualify for the Olympics at this event. A month later, Ivanova earned an Olympic quota place at the 2024 World Wrestling Olympic Qualification Tournament held in Istanbul, Turkey.

== Achievements ==
Year	Tournament	Location	Result	Event
2015	European Games	Baku, Azerbaijan	3rd	Freestyle 60 kg
2018	European Championships	Kaspiysk, Russia	3rd	Freestyle 62 kg
2021	European Championships	Warsaw, Poland	3rd	Freestyle 62 kg
2024	European Championships	Bucharest, Romania	3rd	Freestyle 62 kg
