= Elmira Gambarova =

Azerbaijani freestyle wrestler

Personal information
- Born: 14 March 1994 (age 32)
- Height: 167 cm (5 ft 6 in)

Sport
- Country: Azerbaijan
- Sport: Amateur wrestling
- Event: Freestyle
Medal record
Women's freestyle wrestling
Representing Azerbaijan
European Games
Silver medal – second place	2019 Minsk	62 kg
European Championships
Bronze medal – third place	2019 Bucharest	59 kg
Islamic Solidarity Games
Bronze medal – third place	2017 Baku	63 kg

Elmira Gambarova (born 14 March 1994) is an Azerbaijani freestyle wrestler. She won the silver medal in the women's 62 kg event at the 2019 European Games held in Minsk, Belarus. In the same year, she also won one of the bronze medals in the 59 kg event at the 2019 European Wrestling Championships held in Bucharest, Romania.

In 2017, she competed in the women's freestyle 63 kg event at the European Wrestling Championships held in Novi Sad, Serbia. She was eliminated in her second match by Inna Trazhukova of Russia.

== Achievements ==
Year	Tournament	Location	Result	Event
2017	Islamic Solidarity Games	Baku, Azerbaijan	3rd	Freestyle 63 kg
2019	European Championships	Bucharest, Romania	3rd	Freestyle 59 kg
2019	European Games	Minsk, Belarus	2nd	Freestyle 62 kg
