= Taybe Yusein =

Bulgarian freestyle wrestler (born 1991)

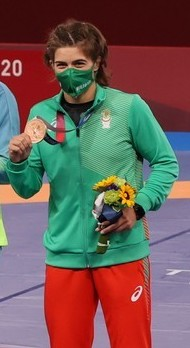
- usein in 2020

Personal information
- Full name: Taybe Mustafa Yusein
- Nationality: Bulgarian
- Born: 4 May 1991 (age 35) Kubrat, Bulgaria

Sport
- Country: Bulgaria
- Sport: Wrestling
- Team: Levski Sofia
Medal record
Women's freestyle wrestling
Representing Bulgaria
Olympic Games
Bronze medal – third place	2020 Tokyo	62 kg
World Championships
Gold medal – first place	2018 Budapest	62 kg
Silver medal – second place	2012 Strathcona County	63 kg
Silver medal – second place	2013 Budapest	59 kg
Silver medal – second place	2019 Nur-Sultan	62 kg
Bronze medal – third place	2014 Tashkent	60 kg
Bronze medal – third place	2015 Las Vegas	63 kg
European Championships
Gold medal – first place	2018 Kaspiysk	62 kg
Gold medal – first place	2019 Bucharest	62 kg
Gold medal – first place	2022 Budapest	62 kg
Silver medal – second place	2010 Baku	59 kg
Silver medal – second place	2011 Dortmund	63 kg
Silver medal – second place	2017 Novi Sad	63 kg
Bronze medal – third place	2014 Vantaa	60 kg
Bronze medal – third place	2020 Rome	62 kg
European Games
Bronze medal – third place	2015 Baku	60 kg
Junior World Championships
Bronze medal – third place	2009 Ankara	59 kg

Taybe Mustafa Yusein (Bulgarian: Тайбе Юсеин Мустафа; born 4 May 1991 in Kubrat) is a Bulgarian wrestler. She competes in the 59 kg division and has won a total of six World championship medals, and eight European championship medals.

In 2021, Yusein won a bronze medal in her event at the Poland Open held in Warsaw, Poland. She also won a bronze medal in the women's freestyle 62 kg event at the 2020 Summer Olympics held in Tokyo, Japan. In her spare time, Yusein enjoys reading, especially crime fiction.

In 2022, she won the silver medal in the 62 kg event at the Dan Kolov & Nikola Petrov Tournament held in Veliko Tarnovo, Bulgaria. She lost her bronze medal match in her event at the Yasar Dogu Tournament held in Istanbul, Turkey. She won the gold medal in the 62 kg event at the 2022 European Wrestling Championships held in Budapest, Hungary.

She won the gold medal in the women's 65 kg event at the Grand Prix de France Henri Deglane 2023 held in Nice, France.
