= 2024 Pan American Wrestling Championships =

2024 Pan American Championship
- Host city: Acapulco, Mexico
- Dates: 21-24 February 2024
- Stadium: Expo Mundo Imperial

Champions
- Freestyle: United States
- Greco-Roman: United States
- Women: United States

The 2024 Pan American Wrestling Championships was the 37th edition of Pan American Wrestling Championships of combined events, and it was held from 21 to 24 February in Acapulco, Mexico.

== Competition schedule ==
All times are (UTC-6)

Date	Time	Event
21 February	10:00-15:15	Qualification rounds & repechages GR 55-60-63-67-77-82-87-130 kg
21 February	17:00-19:30	Finals: 55-60-63-67-77-82-87-130 kg
22 February	10:00-15:15	Qualification rounds & repechages GR 72-97 kg; WW 50-55-57-62-68-72 kg
22 February	17:00-19:30	Finals: GR 72-97 kg; WW 50-55-57-62-68-72 kg
23 February	10:00-15:15	Qualification rounds & repechages WW 53-59-65-76 kg; FS 61-74-86 kg
23 February	17:00-19:30	Finals: WW 53-59-65-76 kg; FS 61-74-86 kg
24 February	10:00-15:15	Qualification rounds & repechages FS 57-65-70-79-92-97-125 kg
24 February	17:00-19:30	Finals: FS 57-65-70-79-92-97-125 kg

== Medal table ==
* Host nation (Mexico)

Rank	Nation	Gold	Silver	Bronze	Total
1	United States	17	5	7	29
2	Ecuador	3	1	4	8
3	Mexico*	2	4	4	10
4	Canada	2	4	2	8
5	Venezuela	1	6	6	13
6	Brazil	1	3	2	6
7	Colombia	1	2	4	7
8	Cuba	1	2	2	5
9	Chile	1	0	1	2
9	Honduras	1	0	1	2
11	Dominican Republic	0	1	5	6
12	Argentina	0	1	3	4
13	Puerto Rico	0	1	2	3
14	Guatemala	0	0	2	2
15	Bahamas	0	0	1	1
15	Panama	0	0	1	1
Totals (16 entries)		30	30	47	107

== Team ranking ==
Rank	Men's freestyle		Men's Greco-Roman		Women's freestyle	
Rank	Team	Points	Team	Points	Team	Points
1	United States	250	United States	183	United States	205
2	Canada	98	Mexico	125	Canada	140
3	Puerto Rico	89	Brazil	94	Ecuador	105
4	Venezuela	85	Colombia	85	Mexico	94
5	Mexico	84	Venezuela	82	Venezuela	87
6	Cuba	57	Chile	70	Brazil	70
7	Dominican Republic	53	Cuba	60	Colombia	64
8	Argentina	52	Honduras	40	Dominican Republic	40
9	Colombia	46	Dominican Republic	40	Cuba	34
10	Guatemala	35	Guatemala	33	Argentina	25

== Medal overview ==
=== Men's freestyle ===
Event	Gold	Silver	Bronze
57 kg	Spencer Lee; United States	Pedro Mejías; Venezuela	Óscar Tigreros; Colombia
57 kg	Spencer Lee; United States	Pedro Mejías; Venezuela	Guesseppe Rea; Ecuador
61 kg	Nick Suriano; United States	Joey Silva; Puerto Rico	Juan Lavat; Mexico
65 kg	Nick Lee; United States	Agustín Destribats; Argentina	Josh Kramer; Ecuador
65 kg	Nick Lee; United States	Agustín Destribats; Argentina	Shannon Hanna; Bahamas
70 kg	Alec Pantaleo; United States	Peiman Biabani; Canada	Mauricio Lovera; Argentina
74 kg	Kyle Dake; United States	Julio Rodríguez; Dominican Republic	Anthony Montero; Venezuela
74 kg	Kyle Dake; United States	Julio Rodríguez; Dominican Republic	Shane Jones; Puerto Rico
79 kg	Alex Facundo; United States	Jasmit Phulka; Canada	José Canó; Mexico
86 kg	Chance Marsteller; United States	Pedro Ceballos; Venezuela	Jorge Llano; Argentina
86 kg	Chance Marsteller; United States	Pedro Ceballos; Venezuela	Carlos Izquierdo; Colombia
92 kg	Nate Jackson; United States	Tejvir Boal; Canada	César Ubico; Guatemala
97 kg	Kyle Snyder; United States	Arturo Silot; Cuba	Luis Miguel Pérez; Dominican Republic
97 kg	Kyle Snyder; United States	Arturo Silot; Cuba	Cristian Sarco; Venezuela
125 kg	Mason Parris; United States	Jonovan Smith; Puerto Rico	José Daniel Díaz; Venezuela
125 kg	Mason Parris; United States	Jonovan Smith; Puerto Rico	Ibrain Torres; Cuba

=== Men's Greco-Roman ===
Event	Gold	Silver	Bronze
55 kg	Marco García; Mexico	Camden Russell; United States	Mario Choc; Guatemala
60 kg	Raiber Rodríguez; Venezuela	Randon Miranda; United States	Yerony Liria; Dominican Republic
60 kg	Raiber Rodríguez; Venezuela	Randon Miranda; United States	Ángel Segura; Mexico
63 kg	Hayden Tuma; United States	Carlos González; Colombia	Héctor Sánchez; Mexico
67 kg	Alejandro Sancho; United States	Andrés Montaño; Ecuador	Néstor Almanza; Chile
67 kg	Alejandro Sancho; United States	Andrés Montaño; Ecuador	Julián Horta; Colombia
72 kg	Alexis Vargas; Mexico	Calebe Ferreira; Brazil	Noah Wachsmuth; United States
77 kg	Jair Cuero; Colombia	Joílson Júnior; Brazil	Yosvanys Peña; Cuba
77 kg	Jair Cuero; Colombia	Joílson Júnior; Brazil	Kamal Bey; United States
82 kg	Sosruko Kodzokov; Brazil	Mahmoud Fawzy; United States	Diego Macías; Mexico
87 kg	Daniel Grégorich; Cuba	Luis Avendaño; Venezuela	Carlos Muñoz; Colombia
87 kg	Daniel Grégorich; Cuba	Luis Avendaño; Venezuela	Ariel Alfonso; Honduras
97 kg	Kevin Mejia; Honduras	Alan Vera; United States	Carlos Adames; Dominican Republic
97 kg	Kevin Mejia; Honduras	Alan Vera; United States	Luillys Pérez; Venezuela
130 kg	Yasmani Acosta; Chile	Óscar Pino; Cuba	Cohlton Schultz; United States

=== Women's freestyle ===
Event	Gold	Silver	Bronze
50 kg	Jacqueline Mollocana; Ecuador	Mariana Rojas; Venezuela	Yorlenis Morán; Panama
50 kg	Jacqueline Mollocana; Ecuador	Mariana Rojas; Venezuela	Audrey Jimenez; United States
53 kg	Lucía Yépez; Ecuador	Betzabeth Argüello; Venezuela	Katie Gomez; United States
53 kg	Lucía Yépez; Ecuador	Betzabeth Argüello; Venezuela	María González; Dominican Republic
55 kg	Alisha Howk; United States	Zeltzin Hernández; Mexico	—N/a*
57 kg	Helen Maroulis; United States	Giullia Penalber; Brazil	Luisa Valverde; Ecuador
57 kg	Helen Maroulis; United States	Giullia Penalber; Brazil	Yocleidy Ramírez; Dominican Republic
59 kg	Laurence Beauregard; Canada	Michaela Beck; United States	Ana França; Brazil
62 kg	Kayla Miracle; United States	Ana Godinez; Canada	Astrid Montero; Venezuela
62 kg	Kayla Miracle; United States	Ana Godinez; Canada	Laís Nunes; Brazil
65 kg	Macey Kilty; United States	Andrea López; Mexico	Miki Rowbottom; Canada
68 kg	Olivia Di Bacco; Canada	Soleymi Caraballo; Venezuela	Alexandria Glaude; United States
68 kg	Olivia Di Bacco; Canada	Soleymi Caraballo; Venezuela	Leonela Ayoví; Ecuador
72 kg	Brooklyn Hays; United States	Edna Jiménez; Mexico	Katie Mulkay; Canada
76 kg	Génesis Reasco; Ecuador	Tatiana Rentería; Colombia	Adeline Gray; United States
76 kg	Génesis Reasco; Ecuador	Tatiana Rentería; Colombia	Linda Machuca; Argentina

- Only two athletes competed, which meant only the gold and silver medals were awarded.

== Participating nations ==
239 wrestlers from 22 countries:

1. Argentina (11)
2. Barbados (1)
3. Bahamas (1)
4. Brazil (19)
5. Canada (23)
6. Chile (11)
7. Colombia (16)
8. Costa Rica (2)
9. Cuba (15)
10. Dominican Republic (10)
11. Ecuador (9)
12. El Salvador (2)
13. Guatemala (9)
14. Honduras (5)
15. Jamaica (3)
16. Mexico (30) (Host)
17. Panama (5)
18. Peru (7)
19. Puerto Rico (13)
20. Uruguay (1)
21. United States (30)
22. Venezuela (16)

== Results ==
Legend

- C — Won by 3 cautions given to the opponent
- DQ — Disqualified
- F — Won by fall
- R — Retired
- WO — Won by walkover

=== Men's freestyle ===
==== Men's freestyle 57 kg ====
24 February

Round of 16
Óscar Tigreros (COL)	12
Enrique Herrera (PER)	8
~~Garette Saunders (CAN)~~
Jaime Pérez (GUA)	WO
Guesseppe Rea (ECU)	4
Jacob Morán (PUR)	1

Quarterfinals
Spencer Lee (USA)	10
Óscar Tigreros (COL)	0
Jorge Olvera (MEX)	9
Davi Giovanetti (BRA)	9
Pedro Mejías (VEN)	11
Jaime Pérez (GUA)	0
Guesseppe Rea (ECU)	13
Peter Hammer (CRC)	11

Semifinals
Spencer Lee (USA)	10
Davi Giovanetti (BRA)	0
Pedro Mejías (VEN)}	12
Guesseppe Rea (ECU)	1

Final
Spencer Lee (USA)	12
Pedro Mejías (VEN)	2

Bronze medal match
Óscar Tigreros (COL)	13
Davi Giovanetti (BRA)	2
Jaime Pérez (GUA)	3
Guesseppe Rea (ECU)	11

==== Men's freestyle 61 kg ====
23 February

Pos	Athlete	Pld	W	L	CP	TP	USA	PUR	MEX	PER	GUA
1	Nick Suriano (USA)	4	4	0	17	25	—	3–2	10–2 Fall	12–2	WO
2	Joey Silva (PUR)	4	3	1	14	25	1–3 PO1	—	13–3	10–0	WO
3	Juan Lavat (MEX)	4	2	2	10	15	0–5 FA	1–4 SU1	—	10–0	WO
4	José Benites (PER)	4	1	3	6	2	1–4 SU1	0–4 SU	0–4 SU	—	WO
5	Edwin Segura (GUA)	4	0	4	0	0	0–5 IN	0–5 IN	0–5 IN	0–5 IN	—

Source: UWW

==== Men's freestyle 65 kg ====
24 February

Round of 16
Jean Olivero (CUB)	0
Josh Kramer (ECU)	10
Elkin España (COL)	12
Matías Muñoz (CHI)	1
Esteban Pérez (GUA)	1
Jacob Torres (CAN)	11
Rafael García (PUR)	2
Álbaro Rudesindo (DOM)	9
Sixto Auccapiña (PER)	1
Shannon Hanna (BAH)	4

Quarterfinals
Nick Lee (USA)	10
Josh Kramer (ECU)	0
Elkin España (COL)	6
Jacob Torres (CAN)	16
Héctor González (MEX)	6
Álbaro Rudesindo (DOM)	8
Shannon Hanna (BAH)	2
Agustín Destribats (ARG)	5

Semifinals
Nick Lee (USA)	10
Jacob Torres (CAN)	0
Álbaro Rudesindo (DOM)	1
Agustín Destribats (ARG)	3

Final
Nick Lee (USA)	WO
Agustín Destribats (ARG)

Bronze medal match
Josh Kramer (ECU)	9
Jacob Torres (CAN)	6
Shannon Hanna (BAH)	11
Álbaro Rudesindo (DOM)	9

==== Men's freestyle 70 kg ====
24 February

Pos	Athlete	Pld	W	L	CP	TP	CAN	ARG	JAM
1	Peiman Biabani (CAN)	2	2	0	8	20	—	10–0	10–0
2	Mauricio Lovera (ARG)	2	1	1	3	4	0–4 SU	—	4–3
3	Jordan Mitchell (JAM)	2	0	2	1	3	0–4 SU	1–3 PO1	—

Source: UWW

Pos	Athlete	Pld	W	L	CP	TP	USA	PUR	MEX
1	Alec Pantaleo (USA)	2	2	0	8	20	—	10–0	10–0
2	Víctor Soto (PUR)	2	1	1	3	13	0–4 SU	—	13–6
3	Erick Barrón (MEX)	2	0	2	1	6	0–4 SU	1–3 PO1	—

Source: UWW

Semifinals
Peiman Biabani (CAN)	11
Víctor Soto (PUR)	0
Alec Pantaleo (USA)	11
Mauricio Lovera (ARG)	0

Final
Peiman Biabani (CAN)
Alec Pantaleo (USA)	WO
Bronze medal
Víctor Soto (PUR)	0
Mauricio Lovera (ARG)	10

==== Men's freestyle 74 kg ====
23 February

Round of 16
Ángel Cortés (PAN)	5
Luis Barrios (HON)	4
Diego Sandoval (MEX)	8
Enrique Pérez (GUA)	0^{R}
César Alvan (BRA)	4
Geandry Garzón (CUB)	9
Hernán Guzmán (COL)	1
Julio Rodríguez (DOM)	7

Quarterfinals
Kyle Dake (USA)	10
Ángel Cortés (PAN)	0
Diego Sandoval (MEX)	0
Anthony Montero (VEN)	10
Adam Thomson (CAN)	5
Geandry Garzón (CUB)	4
Julio Rodríguez (DOM)	10
Shane Jones (PUR)	4

Semifinals
Kyle Dake (USA)	13
Anthony Montero (VEN)	0
Adam Thomson (CAN)	2
Julio Rodríguez (DOM)	4

Final
Kyle Dake (USA)	WO
Julio Rodríguez (DOM)

Repechage round 1
Hernán Guzmán (COL)	4
Shane Jones (PUR)	6

Bronze medal match
Ángel Cortés (PAN)	0
Anthony Montero (VEN)	11
Shane Jones (PUR)	16
Adam Thomson (CAN)	5

==== Men's freestyle 79 kg ====
24 February

Pos	Athlete	Pld	W	L	CP	TP	USA	CAN	MEX	URU
1	Alex Facundo (USA)	3	3	0	13	21	—	10–0	11–0	WO
2	Jasmit Phulka (CAN)	3	2	1	9	10	0–4 SU	—	10–0	WO
3	José Canó (MEX)	3	1	2	5	0	0–4 SU	0–4 SU	—	WO
4	Dylan Palacio (URU)	3	0	3	0	0	0–5 IN	0–5 IN	0–5 IN	—

Source: UWW

==== Men's freestyle 86 kg ====
23 February

Round of 16
José Sánchez (PUR)	0
Jorge Llano (ARG)	5
Pool Ambrocio (PER)	8
Pedro Gonçalves (BRA)	2
Kevin de León (MEX)	11
Eduardo Gajardo (CHI)	1

Quarterfinals
Chance Marsteller (USA)	10
Jorge Llano (ARG)	0
~~Ahmed Shamiya (CAN)~~
Yurieski Torreblanca (CUB)	WO
Pedro Ceballos (VEN)	7
Pool Ambrocio (PER)	0
Kevin de León (MEX)	1
Carlos Izquierdo (COL)	4^{F}

Semifinals
Chance Marsteller (USA)	WO
Yurieski Torreblanca (CUB)
Pedro Ceballos (VEN)	9
Carlos Izquierdo (COL)	8

Final
Chance Marsteller (USA)	WO
Pedro Ceballos (VEN)

Bronze medal match
Jorge Llano (ARG)	WO
Yurieski Torreblanca (CUB)
Pool Ambrocio (PER)	1
Carlos Izquierdo (COL)	3

==== Men's freestyle 92 kg ====
24 February

Pos	Athlete	Pld	W	L	CP	TP	USA	CAN	GUA	MEX	PUR
1	Nate Jackson (USA)	4	4	0	18	30	—	11–0	10–0	3–0 Fall	6–0 Fall
2	Tejvir Boal (CAN)	4	3	1	12	26	0–4 SU	—	11–4	4–0 Fall	11–0
3	César Ubico (GUA)	4	2	2	8	18	0–4 SU	1–3 PO1	—	4–0	10–0
4	Erwin Vargas (MEX)	4	1	3	4	10	0–5 FA	0–5 FA	0–3 PO	—	10–0
5	José Betancourt (PUR)	4	0	4	0	0	0–5 FA	0–4 SU	0–4 SU	0–4 SU	—

Source: UWW

==== Men's freestyle 97 kg ====
24 February

Round of 16
Ricardo Báez (ARG)	1
Luis Miguel Pérez (DOM)	2^{F}
Marcos Santos (PUR)	2
Riley Otto (CAN)	2

Quarterfinals
Kyle Snyder (USA)	8^{F}
Luis Miguel Pérez (DOM)	1
Matías Uribe (CHI)	2
Héctor García (MEX)	1
Ailton Rocha (BRA)	0
Arturo Silot (CUB)	11
Riley Otto (CAN)	0
Cristian Sarco (VEN)	11

Semifinals
Kyle Snyder (USA)	11
Matías Uribe (CHI)	0
Arturo Silot (CUB)	6
Cristian Sarco (VEN)	0

Final
Kyle Snyder (USA)	10
Arturo Silot (CUB)	5

Bronze medal match
Luis Miguel Pérez (DOM)	10
Matías Uribe (CHI)	0
Ailton Rocha (BRA)	0
Cristian Sarco (VEN)	11

==== Men's freestyle 125 kg ====
24 February

Round of 16
Richard DesChatelets (CAN)	10
Gabriel Silva (BRA)	0
Jhoan Ocoro (COL)	2
Elison Adames (DOM)	4
José Daniel Díaz (VEN)	WO
~~Catriel Muriel (ARG)~~
Gino Ávila (HON)	8
Josué Campos (MEX)	1
Maxwell Lacey (CRC)
Ibrain Torres (CUB)	WO

Quarterfinals
Mason Parris (USA)	10
Richard DesChatelets (CAN)	0
Elison Adames (DOM)	1
José Daniel Díaz (VEN)	2
Aaron Johnson (JAM)	3
Gino Ávila (HON)	5
Ibrain Torres (CUB)	4
Jonovan Smith (PUR)	4

Semifinals
Mason Parris (USA)	WO
José Daniel Díaz (VEN)
Gino Ávila (HON)	1
Jonovan Smith (PUR)	2

Final
Mason Parris (USA)	WO
Jonovan Smith (PUR)

Bronze medal match
Richard DesChatelets (CAN)	0
José Daniel Díaz (VEN)	6
Ibrain Torres (CUB)	WO
Gino Ávila (HON)

=== Men's Greco-Roman ===
==== Men's Greco-Roman 55 kg ====
21 February

Pos	Athlete	Pld	W	L	CP	TP	CAN	MEX	USA
1	Marco García (MEX)	2	2	0	7	14	—	9–1	5–0
2	Camden Russell (USA)	2	1	1	4	10	1–4 SU1	—	9–4
3	Mario Choc (GUA)	2	0	2	1	4	0–3 PO	1–3 PO1	—

Source: UWW

==== Men's Greco-Roman 60 kg ====
21 February

Round of 16
Cristóbal Torres (CHI)	5
Erivan Rocha (BRA)	3

Quarterfinals
Raiber Rodríguez (VEN)	8
Cristóbal Torres (CHI)	0
Keeyan Trotman (CAN)	0
Yerony Liria (DOM)	9
Jeremy Peralta (ECU)	1
Ángel Segura (MEX)	10
Randon Miranda (USA)	9
Dicther Toro (COL)	1

Semifinals
Raiber Rodríguez (VEN)	6
Yerony Liria (DOM)	1
Ángel Segura (MEX)	0
Randon Miranda (USA)	10

Final
Raiber Rodríguez (VEN)	8
Randon Miranda (USA)	7

Bronze medal match
Cristóbal Torres (CHI)	1
Yerony Liria (DOM)	6
Dicther Toro (COL)	1
Ángel Segura (MEX)	2

==== Men's Greco-Roman 63 kg ====
21 February

Pos	Athlete	Pld	W	L	CP	TP	USA	COL	MEX	CUB
1	Hayden Tuma (USA)	3	3	0	11	16	—	4–1	4–0	8–3 DQ
2	Carlos González (COL)	3	2	1	9	4	1–3 PO1	—	3–0	WO
3	Hector Sánchez (MEX)	3	1	2	5	0	0–3 PO	0–3 PO	—	WO
—	Kevin de Armas (CUB)	3	0	3	0	3	0–5 DSQ	0–5 DSQ	0–5 DSQ	—

Source: UWW

==== Men's Greco-Roman 67 kg ====
21 February

Round of 16
Lee Mauras (PUR)	0
Starlin Laguerre (DOM)	9
Gavin Eldridge (CAN)	10^{F}
Cristian Mejía (GUA)	0
Mauricio Lovera (ARG)	8
Osvaldo Yáñez (MEX)	0

Quarterfinals
Alejandro Sancho (USA)	4
Starlin Laguerre (DOM)	1
Nilton Soto (PER)	1
Néstor Almanza (CHI)	3
Andrés Montaño (ECU)	8
Gavin Eldridge (CAN)	0
Mauricio Lovera (ARG)	0
Julián Horta (COL)	8

Semifinals
Alejandro Sancho (USA)	4
Néstor Almanza (CHI)	3
Andrés Montaño (ECU)	2
Julián Horta (COL)	1

Final
Alejandro Sancho (USA)	3
Andrés Montaño (ECU)	1

Bronze medal match
Starlin Laguerre (DOM)	0
Néstor Almanza (CHI)	9
Gavin Eldridge (CAN)	0
Julián Horta (COL)	8

==== Men's Greco-Roman 72 kg ====
22 February

Pos	Athlete	Pld	W	L	CP	TP	MEX	BRA	USA	GUA
1	Alexis Vargas (MEX)	3	3	0	11	26	—	9–1	11–3	6–1
2	Calebe Ferreira (BRA)	3	2	1	8	18	1–4 SU1	—	8–2	9–0
3	Noah Wachsmuth (USA)	3	1	2	7	11	1–4 SU1	1–3 PO1	—	6–3 Fall
4	Alejandro Varela (GUA)	3	0	3	1	4	1–3 PO1	0–4 SU	0–5 FA	—

Source: UWW

==== Men's Greco-Roman 77 kg ====
21 February

Round of 16
Jon Viruet (PUR)	5^{F}
Raúl Unzuet (MEX)	1
Alvis Almendra (PAN)	0
Jair Cuero (COL)	9
David Choc (GUA)	2
John Yeats (CAN)	0

Quarterfinals
Yosvanys Peña (CUB)	8
Jon Viruet (PUR)	0
Eduardo Bernal (CHI)	0
Joílson Júnior (BRA)	10^{F}
Wuileixis Rivas (VEN)	0
Jair Cuero (COL)	11
David Choc (GUA)	0
Kamal Bey (USA)	10

Semifinals
Yosvanys Peña (CUB)	3
Joílson Júnior (BRA)	6^{F}
Jair Cuero (COL)	6
Kamal Bey (USA)	6

Final
Joílson Júnior (BRA)
Jair Cuero (COL)	WO

Repechage round 1
Alvis Almendra (PAN)	1
Wuileixis Rivas (VEN)	4

Bronze medal match
Eduardo Bernal (CHI)	0
Yosvanys Peña (CUB)	8
Wuileixis Rivas (VEN)	0
Kamal Bey (USA)	11

==== Men's Greco-Roman 82 kg ====
21 February

Pos	Athlete	Pld	W	L	CP	TP	BRA	USA	MEX
1	Sosruko Kodzokov (BRA)	2	2	0	7	13	—	5–2	8–0
2	Mahmoud Fawzy (USA)	2	1	1	4	10	1–3 PO1	—	8–3
3	Diego Macías (MEX)	2	0	2	1	3	0–4 SU	1–3 PO1	—

Source: UWW

==== Men's Greco-Roman 87 kg ====
21 February

Round of 16
Carlos Salazar (MEX)	3
José Moreno (CHI)	4

Quarterfinals
Daniel Grégorich (CUB)	4^{F}
José Moreno (CHI)	0
Spencer Woods (USA)	3
Carlos Muñoz (COL)	3
Ronisson Brandão (BRA)	1
Ariel Alfonso (HON)	6^{F}
Jorge Llano (ARG)	0
Luis Avendaño (VEN)	8

Semifinals
Daniel Grégorich (CUB)	4
Carlos Muñoz (COL)	0
Ariel Alfonso (HON)	0
Luis Avendaño (VEN)	9

Final
Daniel Grégorich (CUB)	4
Luis Avendaño (VEN)	0

Bronze medal match
José Moreno (CHI)	0
Carlos Muñoz (COL)	9
Jorge Llano (ARG)	0
Ariel Alfonso (HON)	8

==== Men's Greco-Roman 97 kg ====
22 February

Quarterfinals		Semifinals		Final
Kevin Mejía (HON)	8
Ricardo Gómez (ARG)	0	Kevin Mejía (HON)	10
Carlos Adames (DOM)	8	Carlos Adames (DOM)	0
Kauan Gomes (BRA)	0			Kevin Mejía (HON)	8
Luillys Pérez (VEN)	9			Alan Vera (USA)	0
Max Madrid (PAN)	0	Luillys Pérez (VEN)	3
Pedro Bello (MEX)	2	Alan Vera (USA)	5
Alan Vera (USA)	11

Bronze medals
Ricardo Gómez (ARG)	0
Carlos Adames (DOM)	8
Pedro Bello (MEX)	1
Luillys Pérez (VEN)	5

==== Men's Greco-Roman 130 kg ====
21 February

Pos	Athlete	Pld	W	L	CP	TP	CUB	CHI	BRA
1	Óscar Pino (CUB)	2	2	0	8	1	—	1–1	WO
2	Yasmani Acosta (CHI)	2	1	1	6	1	1–3 PO1	—	WO
3	Eduard Soghomonyan (BRA)	2	0	2	0	0	0–5 IN	0–5 IN	—

Source: UWW

Pos	Athlete	Pld	W	L	CP	TP	USA	VEN	CAN	MEX
1	Cohlton Schultz (USA)	3	3	0	11	14	—	4–1	6–0	4–0 Fall
2	Moisés Pérez (VEN)	3	2	1	9	18	1–3 PO1	—	9–0	8–0
3	Jorawar Dhinsa (CAN)	3	1	2	5	4	0–3 PO	0–4 SU	—	4–0 Fall
4	Beder Cantú (MEX)	3	0	3	0	0	0–5 FA	0–4 SU	0–5 FA	—

Source: UWW

Semifinals
Óscar Pino (CUB)	5
Moisés Pérez (VEN)	1
Cohlton Schultz (USA)
Yasmani Acosta (CHI)	WO

Final
Óscar Pino (CUB)
Yasmani Acosta (CHI)	WO
Bronze medal
Moisés Pérez (VEN)	0
Cohlton Schultz (USA)	2^{F}

=== Women's freestyle ===
==== Women's freestyle 50 kg ====
22 February

Round of 16
Yorlenis Morán (PAN)	5
Antuaneth Casusol (PER)	0
Javiera Ortega (CHI)	8
Maia Cabrera (ARG)	6^{F}
Mariana Rojas (VEN)	10
Kamila Barbosa (BRA)	1
Karla Hernández (ESA)	0
Katie Dutchak (CAN)	10
Linda Castañeda (MEX)	0
Audrey Jimenez (USA)	10

Quarterfinals
Alisson Cardozo (COL)	3
Yorlenis Morán (PAN)	5
Maia Cabrera (ARG)	0
Mariana Rojas (VEN)	10
~~Yusneylys Guzmán (CUB)~~
Katie Dutchak (CAN)	WO
Audrey Jimenez (USA)	2
Jacqueline Mollocana (ECU)	6^{F}

Semifinals
Yorlenis Morán (PAN)	0
Mariana Rojas (VEN)	10
Katie Dutchak (CAN)	1
Jacqueline Mollocana (ECU)	3

Final
Mariana Rojas (VEN)	3
Jacqueline Mollocana (ECU)	4

Repechage round 1
Kamila Barbosa (BRA)	2
Maia Cabrera (ARG)	1

Bronze medal match
Kamila Barbosa (BRA)	6
Yorlenis Morán (PAN)	7
Audrey Jimenez (USA)	8
Katie Dutchak (CAN)	2

==== Women's freestyle 53 kg ====
23 February

Round of 16
Katie Gomez (USA)	10
Nathaly Herrera (PER)	0
Laura Herin (CUB)	6
Sabrina Tapajós (BRA)	2
Yusneiry Agrazal (PAN)	4
María González (DOM)	4
Pamela Banda (MEX)	0
Eva González (COL)	4^{F}

Quarterfinals
Lucía Yépez (ECU)	11
Katie Gomez (USA)	0
Laura Herin (CUB)	10
Antonia Valdés (CHI)	0
Betzabeth Argüello (VEN)	12^{F}
María González (DOM)	0
Eva González (COL)	0
Samantha Stewart (CAN)	10

Semifinals
Lucía Yépez (ECU)	11
Laura Herin (CUB)	0
Betzabeth Argüello (VEN)	4
Samantha Stewart (CAN)	0

Final
Lucía Yépez (ECU)	WO
Betzabeth Argüello (VEN)

Bronze medal match
Katie Gomez (USA)	10
Laura Herin (CUB)	0
María González (DOM)	4^{F}
Samantha Stewart (CAN)	0

==== Women's freestyle 55 kg ====
22 February

Pos	Athlete	Pld	W	L	CP	TP	USA	MEX	CAN
1	Alisha Howk (USA)	2	2	0	8	4	—	4–4	WO
2	Zeltzin Hernández (MEX)	2	1	1	6	4	1–3 PO1	—	WO
—	Diana Weicker (CAN)	2	0	2	0	0	0–5 FO	0–5 FO	—

Source: UWW

==== Women's freestyle 57 kg ====
22 February

Round of 16
Andrea González (COL)	WO
~~Karoline Ortiz (PUR)~~
Ángela Álvarez (CUB)	11
Bertha Rojas (MEX)	0
Jacqueline Hernández (ESA)	1
Yocleidy Ramírez (DOM)	4
Camila Amarilla (ARG)	0
Betzabeth Sarco (VEN)	4^{F}

Quarterfinals
Helen Maroulis (USA)	9
Andrea González (COL)	0
Ángela Álvarez (CUB)	1
Luisa Valverde (ECU)	11
Giullia Penalber (BRA)	10^{F}
Yocleidy Ramírez (DOM)	0
Betzabeth Sarco (VEN)	1
Hannah Taylor (CAN)	3

Semifinals
Helen Maroulis (USA)	4^{F}
Luisa Valverde (ECU)	0
Giullia Penalber (BRA)	4
Hannah Taylor (CAN)	0

Final
Helen Maroulis (USA)	4
Giullia Penalber (BRA)	1

Bronze medal match
Andrea González (COL)	4
Luisa Valverde (ECU)	6
Yocleidy Ramírez (DOM)	WO
Hannah Taylor (CAN)

==== Women's freestyle 59 kg ====
23 February

Pos	Athlete	Pld	W	L	CP	TP	CAN	USA	BRA	MEX	BAR
1	Laurence Beauregard (CAN)	4	4	0	18	31	—	5–0 Fall	10–0	10–0	6–0 Fall
2	Michaela Beck (USA)	4	3	1	11	27	0–5 FA	—	5–0	10–0	12–1
3	Ana França (BRA)	4	2	2	9	18	0–4 SU	0–3 PO	—	10–0	8–0 Fall
4	Paula León (MEX)	4	1	3	5	2	0–4 SU	0–4 SU	0–4 SU	—	2–0 Fall
5	Jessica Derrell (BAR)	4	0	4	1	1	0–5 FA	1–4 SU1	0–5 FA	0–5 FA	—

Source: UWW

==== Women's freestyle 62 kg ====
22 February

Round of 16
Sierra Brown Ton (JAM)	0
Katherine Rentería (COL)	12
María Santana (CUB)	11
Carina Giangeruso (PUR)	0

Quarterfinals
Kayla Miracle (USA)	11
Katherine Rentería (COL)	0
Astrid Montero (VEN)	11
Virginia Jiménez (CHI)	0
Ana Godinez (CAN)	10
Arely Novelo (MEX)	0
María Santana (CUB)	0
Laís Nunes (BRA)	5

Semifinals
Kayla Miracle (USA)	4^{F}
Astrid Montero (VEN)	5
Ana Godinez (CAN)	2
Laís Nunes (BRA)	1

Final
Kayla Miracle (USA)	6
Ana Godinez (CAN)	6

Bronze medal match
Katherine Rentería (COL)	1
Astrid Montero (VEN)	11
Arely Novelo (MEX)	0
Laís Nunes (BRA)	11

==== Women's freestyle 65 kg ====
23 February

Pos	Athlete	Pld	W	L	CP	TP	USA	MEX	CAN
1	Macey Kilty (USA)	2	2	0	8	22	—	11–0	11–0
2	Andrea López (MEX)	2	1	1	3	9	0–4 SU	—	9–2
3	Miki Rowbottom (CAN)	2	0	2	1	2	0–4 SU	1–3 PO1	—

Source: UWW

==== Women's freestyle 68 kg ====
22 February

Quarterfinals
Nicoll Parrado (COL)	WO
~~Thamires Machado (BRA)~~
Alexandria Glaude (USA)	0
Olivia Di Bacco (CAN)	5
Soleymi Caraballo (VEN)	8
Leonela Ayoví (ECU)	0
Brenda Sterling (CUB)	2
Alejandra Rivera (MEX)	4

Semifinals
Nicoll Parrado (COL)	0
Olivia Di Bacco (CAN)	11
Soleymi Caraballo (VEN)	12
Alejandra Rivera (MEX)	2

Final
Olivia Di Bacco (CAN)	WO
Soleymi Caraballo (VEN)

Bronze medals
Alexandria Glaude (USA)	3
Nicoll Parrado (COL)	3
Leonela Ayoví (ECU)	6
Alejandra Rivera (MEX)	3

==== Women's freestyle 72 kg ====
23 February

Pos	Athlete	Pld	W	L	CP	TP	USA	MEX	CAN
1	Brooklyn Hays (USA)	2	2	0	7	17	—	11–0	6–4
2	Edna Jiménez (MEX)	2	1	1	3	12	0–4 SU	—	12–4
3	Katie Mulkay (CAN)	2	0	2	2	8	1–3 PO1	1–3 PO1	—

Source: UWW

==== Women's freestyle 76 kg ====
23 February

Round of 16
Meiriele Hora (BRA)	1
Génesis Reasco (ECU)	6
Nubia Lorenzana (MEX)	0
Emelyn Bautista (DOM)	6^{F}
Linda Machuca (ARG)	12
Saidy Chávez (HON)	1

Quarterfinals
Adeline Gray (USA)	0
Génesis Reasco (ECU)	10
Shauna Kuebeck (CAN)	4^{F}
María Acosta (VEN)	2
Milaimys Marín (CUB)
Emelyn Bautista (DOM)	WO
Linda Machuca (ARG)	0
Tatiana Rentería (COL)	10

Semifinals
Génesis Reasco (ECU)	8
Shauna Kuebeck (CAN)	4
Emelyn Bautista (DOM)	0
Tatiana Rentería (COL)	10

Final
Génesis Reasco (ECU)	9
Tatiana Rentería (COL)	0

Repechage round 1
Meiriele Hora (BRA)	0
Adeline Gray (USA)	10

Bronze medal match
Adeline Gray (USA)	WO
Shauna Kuebeck (CAN)
Linda Machuca (ARG)	11
Emelyn Bautista (DOM)	0

== See also ==
- Wrestling at the 2023 Pan American Games
- Wrestling at the 2024 Summer Olympics
