= Óscar Tigreros =

Colombian freestyle wrestler (born 1997)

Personal information
- Full name: Óscar Eduardo Tigreros Urbano
- Born: 28 July 1997 (age 29) Buga, Valle del Cauca, Colombia

Sport
- Country: Colombia
- Sport: Amateur wrestling
- Weight class: 57 kg
- Events: Freestyle; Greco-Roman
Medal record
| Event | 1st | 2nd | 3rd |
|---|---|---|---|
| Pan American Games | 0 | 1 | 0 |
| Pan American Championships | 0 | 2 | 2 |
| CAC Games | 0 | 0 | 1 |
| South American Games | 1 | 1 | 0 |
| Bolivarian Games | 1 | 0 | 0 |
| U20 Pan American Championships | 0 | 2 | 1 |
| U17 Pan American Championships | 1 | 1 | 0 |
| South American Youth Games | 1 | 0 | 1 |
| Total | 4 | 7 | 5 |
Men's freestyle wrestling
Representing Colombia
Pan American Games
| Silver medal – second place | 2023 Santiago | 57 kg |
Pan American Championships
| Silver medal – second place | 2018 Lima | 57 kg |
| Silver medal – second place | 2019 Buenos Aires | 57 kg |
| Bronze medal – third place | 2022 Acapulco | 57 kg |
| Bronze medal – third place | 2024 Acapulco | 57 kg |
Central American and Caribbean Games
| Bronze medal – third place | 2018 Barranquilla | 57 kg |
South American Games
| Gold medal – first place | 2022 Asunción | 57 kg |
| Silver medal – second place | 2018 Cochabamba | 57 kg |
Bolivarian Games
| Gold medal – first place | 2022 Valledupar | 57 kg |
U20 Pan American Championships
| Silver medal – second place | 2014 Toronto | 50 kg |
| Silver medal – second place | 2017 Lima | 50 kg |
| Bronze medal – third place | 2015 Havana | 50 kg |
U17 Pan American Championships
| Gold medal – first place | 2013 Medellín | 42 kg |
| Silver medal – second place | 2014 Recife | 46 kg |
South American Youth Games
| Gold medal – first place | 2013 Lima | 46 kg |
Men's Greco-Roman wrestling
South American Youth Games
| Bronze medal – third place | 2013 Lima | 50 kg |

Óscar Eduardo Tigreros Urbano (Note: In this Spanish name, the first or paternal surname is Tigreros and the second or maternal family name is Urbano.) (born 28 July 1997) is a Colombian freestyle wrestler. He won the gold medal in the men's 57 kg event at the 2022 Bolivarian Games held in Valledupar, Colombia. He is also a South American Games gold medalist and two-time Pan American runner-up. He competed in the men's 57 kg event at the 2020 Summer Olympics in Tokyo, Japan.

== Career ==
In 2018, Tigreros won the silver medal in the 57 kg event at the Pan American Wrestling Championships and the silver medal in the 57 kg event at the South American Games in Cochabamba, Bolivia. That year, he also won one of the bronze medals in the 57 kg event at the 2018 Central American and Caribbean Games held in Barranquilla, Colombia.

He won the silver medal in the 57 kg event at the 2019 Pan American Wrestling Championships held in Buenos Aires, Argentina. A few months later, he also competed in the 57 kg event at the 2019 Pan American Games held in Lima, Peru without winning a medal; he lost his bronze medal match against Darthe Capellan of Canada.

In 2020, Tigreros qualified to represent Colombia at the 2020 Summer Olympics in Tokyo, Japan, when he recorded a silver-medal finish at the Pan American Olympic Qualification Tournament held in Ottawa, Canada.

Tigreros won one of the bronze medals in his event at the 2022 Pan American Wrestling Championships held in Acapulco, Mexico. He won the gold medal in his event at the 2022 Bolivarian Games held in Valledupar, Colombia. He defeated Enrique Herrera of Peru in his gold medal match.

Tigreros competed in the 57 kg event at the 2022 World Wrestling Championships held in Belgrade, Serbia. He lost his first match against Zelimkhan Abakarov of Albania and was eliminated in the repechage by Reineri Andreu of Cuba.

Tigreros won the gold medal in his event at the 2022 South American Games held in Asunción, Paraguay. He defeated Pedro Mejías of Venezuela in his gold-medal match.

In 2024, Tigreros won a bronze medal in his event at the 2024 Pan American Wrestling Championships held in Acapulco, Mexico. He competed at the Pan American Wrestling Olympic Qualification Tournament in Acapulco, Mexico hoping to qualify for the 2024 Summer Olympics in Paris, France. He was eliminated in his second match.

== Achievements ==
| Year | Tournament | Location | Result | Event |
Representing Colombia
| 2013 | U17 Pan American Championships | Medellín, Colombia | 1st | Freestyle 42 kg |
| 2013 | South American Youth Games | Lima, Peru | 1st | Freestyle 46 kg |
| 2013 | South American Youth Games | Lima, Peru | 3rd | Greco-Roman 50 kg |
| 2014 | U17 Pan American Championships | Recife, Brazil | 2nd | Freestyle 46 kg |
| 2014 | U20 Pan American Championships | Toronto, Canada | 2nd | Freestyle 50 kg |
| 2015 | U20 Pan American Championships | Havana, Cuba | 3rd | Freestyle 50 kg |
| 2017 | U20 Pan American Championships | Lima, Peru | 2nd | Freestyle 50 kg |
| 2018 | Pan American Championships | Lima, Peru | 2nd | Freestyle 57 kg |
| 2018 | South American Games | Cochabamba, Bolivia | 2nd | Freestyle 57 kg |
| 2018 | Central American and Caribbean Games | Barranquilla, Colombia | 3rd | Freestyle 57 kg |
| 2019 | Pan American Championships | Buenos Aires, Argentina | 2nd | Freestyle 57 kg |
| 2022 | Pan American Championships | Acapulco, Mexico | 3rd | Freestyle 57 kg |
| 2022 | Bolivarian Games | Valledupar, Colombia | 1st | Freestyle 57 kg |
| 2022 | South American Games | Asunción, Paraguay | 1st | Freestyle 57 kg |
| 2023 | Pan American Games | Santiago, Chile | 2nd | Freestyle 57 kg |
| 2024 | Pan American Championships | Acapulco, Mexico | 3rd | Freestyle 57 kg |
