= Wrestling at the 2023 Pan American Games – Men's Greco-Roman 67 kg =

Men's Greco-Roman 67 at the 2023 Pan American Games
- Venue: Olympic Training Center in Ñuñoa
- Dates: November 4
- Competitors: 10 from 10 nations

Medalists
Gold medal	Luis Orta	Cuba
Silver medal	Julián Horta	Colombia
Bronze medal	Andrés Montaño	Ecuador
Bronze medal	Nilton Soto	Peru

The men's Greco-Roman 67 kg competition of the Wrestling events at the 2023 Pan American Games in Ñuñoa was held on November 4.

== Qualification ==
The winner of each weight category at the 2021 Junior Pan American Games in Cali, Colombia qualified directly, along with the top four at the 2022 Pan American Wrestling Championships and 2023 Pan American Wrestling Championships. The host country (Chile) is guaranteed a spot in each event, but its athletes must compete in both the 2022 and 2023 Pan American Championship. If Chile does not qualify at any of the first two events, it will take the fourth spot available at the 2023 Pan American Championships. A further six wildcards (four men and two women) will be awarded to nations without any qualified athlete but took part in the qualification tournaments.

== Schedule ==
All times are local (UTC−3)

Date	Time	Event
Wednesday, 4 November 2023	10:00	Round of 16
Wednesday, 4 November 2023	11:00	Quarterfinals
Wednesday, 4 November 2023	12:00	Semifinals
Wednesday, 4 November 2023	17:00	Finals

== Results ==
Legend

- F — Won by fall

=== Main Bracket ===
Round of 16
Calebe Ferreira (BRA)	3
Néstor Almanza (CHI)	5
Nilton Soto (PER)	WO
Edsson Olmos (MEX)

Quarterfinals
Lisandro Cabrera (PAR)	0
Néstor Almanza (CHI)	8
Luis Orta (CUB)	9
Andrés Montaño (ECU)	0
Mauricio Lovera (ARG)	0
Julián Horta (COL)	8
Nilton Soto (PER)	6
Starlin Laguerre (DOM)	5

Semifinals
Néstor Almanza (CHI)	0
Luis Orta (CUB)	8
Julián Horta (COL)	8
Nilton Soto (PER)	0

Finals
Luis Orta (CUB)	10
Julián Horta (COL)	1

=== Repechage ===
Bronze medal match
Andrés Montaño (ECU)	5
Néstor Almanza (CHI)	3
Mauricio Lovera (ARG)	0
Nilton Soto (PER)	9

== Final standing ==
Rank	Athlete
1st place, gold medalist(s)	Luis Orta (CUB)
2nd place, silver medalist(s)	Julián Horta (COL)
3rd place, bronze medalist(s)	Andrés Montaño (ECU)
3rd place, bronze medalist(s)	Nilton Soto (PER)
5	Néstor Almanza (CHI)
5	Mauricio Lovera (ARG)
7	Starlin Laguerre (DOM)
8	Calebe Ferreira (BRA)
9	Edsson Olmos (MEX)
10	Lisandro Cabrera (PAR)
