= Wrestling at the 2023 Pan American Games =

- Wrestling pictogram
- Venue: Olympic Training Center
- Start date: November 1, 2023
- End date: November 4, 2023
- No. of events: 18 (12 men, 6 women)
- Competitors: 163 from 24 nations

Wrestling competitions at the 2023 Pan American Games in Santiago, Chile were held between November 1 and 4, 2023 at the Olympic Training Center in Ñuñoa.

The competition is split into two disciplines, Freestyle and Greco-Roman which were further divided into different weight categories. Men competed in both disciplines whereas women only took part in the freestyle events, with 18 gold medals awarded (12 for men and six for women). Wrestling has been contested at every Pan American Games.

== Qualification ==
A total of 168 wrestlers will qualify to compete at the games. The winner of each weight category at the 2021 Junior Pan American Games in Cali, Colombia qualified directly, along with the top four at the 2022 Pan American Wrestling Championships and 2023 Pan American Wrestling Championships. The host country (Chile) is guaranteed a spot in each event, but its athletes must compete in both the 2022 and 2023 Pan American Championship. If Chile does not qualify at any of the first two events, it will take the fourth spot available at the 2023 Pan American Championships. A further six wildcards (four men and two women) will be awarded to nations without any qualified athlete but took part in the qualification tournaments.

== Participating nations ==
A total of 24 countries qualified wrestlers. The number of athletes a nation has entered is in parentheses beside the name of the country.

- Argentina (8)
- Bahamas (1)
- Barbados (1)
- Bolivia (1)
- Brazil (10)
- Canada (7)
- Chile (16)
- Colombia (11)
- Costa Rica (1)
- Cuba (18)
- Dominican Republic (11)
- Ecuador (7)
- El Salvador (1)
- Honduras (4)
- Independent Athletes Team (2)
- Jamaica (1)
- Mexico (12)
- Panama (3)
- Paraguay (1)
- Peru (5)
- Puerto Rico (9)
- United States (17)
- Uruguay (1)
- Venezuela (16)

== Medal summary ==
=== Medal table ===
* Host nation (Chile)

Rank	NOC's	Gold	Silver	Bronze	Total
1	Cuba	8	5	3	16
2	United States	7	3	1	11
3	Brazil	2	1	1	4
4	Ecuador	1	1	4	6
5	Venezuela	0	4	8	12
6	Colombia	0	3	3	6
7	Canada	0	1	4	5
8	Chile*	0	0	3	3
9	Argentina	0	0	2	2
9	Puerto Rico	0	0	2	2
11	Honduras	0	0	1	1
11	Jamaica	0	0	1	1
11	Mexico	0	0	1	1
11	Peru	0	0	1	1
Totals (14 entries)		18	18	35	71

=== Medalists ===
==== Men's freestyle ====
Event	Gold	Silver	Bronze
57 kg	Zane Richards; United States	Óscar Tigreros; Colombia	Darian Cruz; Puerto Rico
57 kg	Zane Richards; United States	Óscar Tigreros; Colombia	Osmany Diversent; Cuba
65 kg	Alejandro Valdés; Cuba	Nahshon Garrett; United States	Agustín Destribats; Argentina
65 kg	Alejandro Valdés; Cuba	Nahshon Garrett; United States	Joey Silva; Puerto Rico
74 kg	Tyler Berger; United States	Franklin Marén; Cuba	Adam Thomson; Canada
74 kg	Tyler Berger; United States	Franklin Marén; Cuba	Anthony Montero; Venezuela
86 kg	Yurieski Torreblanca; Cuba	Mark Hall II; United States	Hunter Lee; Canada
86 kg	Yurieski Torreblanca; Cuba	Mark Hall II; United States	Pedro Ceballos; Venezuela
97 kg	Kyle Snyder; United States	Arturo Silot; Cuba	Nishan Randhawa; Canada
97 kg	Kyle Snyder; United States	Arturo Silot; Cuba	Cristian Sarco; Venezuela
125 kg	Mason Parris; United States	José Daniel Díaz; Venezuela	Aaron Johnson; Jamaica
125 kg	Mason Parris; United States	José Daniel Díaz; Venezuela	Catriel Muriel; Argentina

==== Men's Greco-Roman ====
Event	Gold	Silver	Bronze
60 kg	Ildar Hafizov; United States	Kevin de Armas; Cuba	Jeremy Peralta; Ecuador
60 kg	Ildar Hafizov; United States	Kevin de Armas; Cuba	Raiber Rodríguez; Venezuela
67 kg	Luis Orta; Cuba	Julián Horta; Colombia	Andrés Montaño; Ecuador
67 kg	Luis Orta; Cuba	Julián Horta; Colombia	Nilton Soto; Peru
77 kg	Kamal Bey; United States	Joílson Júnior; Brazil	Yosvanys Peña; Cuba
77 kg	Kamal Bey; United States	Joílson Júnior; Brazil	Emmanuel Benítez; Mexico
87 kg	Daniel Grégorich; Cuba	Luis Avendaño; Venezuela	Carlos Muñoz; Colombia
87 kg	Daniel Grégorich; Cuba	Luis Avendaño; Venezuela	José Moreno; Chile
97 kg	Gabriel Rosillo; Cuba	Luillys Pérez; Venezuela	Kevin Mejía; Honduras
97 kg	Gabriel Rosillo; Cuba	Luillys Pérez; Venezuela	Igor Queiroz; Brazil
130 kg	Óscar Pino; Cuba	Cohlton Schultz; United States	Yasmani Acosta; Chile
130 kg	Óscar Pino; Cuba	Cohlton Schultz; United States	Moisés Pérez; Venezuela

==== Women's freestyle ====
Event	Gold	Silver	Bronze
50 kg	Yusneylys Guzmán; Cuba	Jacqueline Mollocana; Ecuador	Mariana Rojas; Venezuela
50 kg	Yusneylys Guzmán; Cuba	Jacqueline Mollocana; Ecuador	Not awarded (only six entries)
53 kg	Lucía Yépez; Ecuador	Laura Herin; Cuba	Betzabeth Argüello; Venezuela
53 kg	Lucía Yépez; Ecuador	Laura Herin; Cuba	Antonia Valdés; Chile
57 kg	Giullia Penalber; Brazil	Hannah Taylor; Canada	Ángela Álvarez; Cuba
57 kg	Giullia Penalber; Brazil	Hannah Taylor; Canada	Luisa Valverde; Ecuador
62 kg	Laís Nunes; Brazil	María Santana; Cuba	Kayla Miracle; United States
62 kg	Laís Nunes; Brazil	María Santana; Cuba	Katherine Rentería; Colombia
68 kg	Forrest Molinari; United States	Soleymi Caraballo; Venezuela	Nicoll Parrado; Colombia
68 kg	Forrest Molinari; United States	Soleymi Caraballo; Venezuela	Olivia Di Bacco; Canada
76 kg	Milaimys Marín; Cuba	Tatiana Rentería; Colombia	María Acosta; Venezuela
76 kg	Milaimys Marín; Cuba	Tatiana Rentería; Colombia	Génesis Reasco; Ecuador

== See also ==
- 2023 Pan American Wrestling Championships
- Wrestling at the 2024 Summer Olympics
