= 2024 Pan American Wrestling Olympic Qualification Tournament =

- Venue: Expo Mundo Imperial
- Location: Acapulco, Mexico
- Dates: 28 February – 1 March 2024

The 2024 Olympic Wrestling Pan American Qualification Tournament was the first regional qualifying tournament for the 2024 Summer Olympics. The event was held from 28 February to 1 March 2024, at Expo Mundo Imperial in Acapulco, Mexico.

== Qualification summary ==
Thirty-six athletes secured a spot in the 2024 Summer Olympics, in Paris. Two spots were given to each weight class. Quota places are allocated to the respective NOC and not to the competitor who achieved the place in the qualification event.

NOC	Men's freestyle						Men's Greco-Roman						Women's freestyle						Total
NOC	57	65	74	86	97	125	60	67	77	87	97	130	50	53	57	62	68	76	Total
Canada				X		X									X	X		X	5
Chile								X				X							2
Colombia									X	X			X						3
Cuba		X	X		X		X		X				X						6
Dominican Republic					X														1
Honduras											X								1
Ecuador								X							X			X	3
Mexico	X	X																	2
Puerto Rico	X			X		X													3
United States										X	X	X		X		X	X		6
Venezuela			X				X							X			X		4
Total:11 NOCs	2	2	2	2	2	2	2	2	2	2	2	2	2	2	2	2	2	2	36

== Men's freestyle ==
=== 57 kg ===
1 March

Round of 16
Roman Bravo-Young (MEX)	11
Enrique Herrera (PER)	0
Darian Cruz (PUR)	10
Davi Giovanetti (BRA)	0
Peter Hammer (CRC)	WO
~~Edwin Segura (GUA)~~

Quarterfinals
Pedro Mejías (VEN)	6
Roman Bravo-Young (MEX)	10
Darthe Capellan (CAN)	5
Óscar Tigreros (COL)	8
Guesseppe Rea (ECU)	1
Darian Cruz (PUR)	12
Peter Hammer (CRC)	1
Zane Richards (USA)	14

Semifinals
Roman Bravo-Young (MEX)	14
Óscar Tigreros (COL)	4
Darian Cruz (PUR)	2
Zane Richards (USA)	2

Qualified athletes
Roman Bravo-Young (MEX)	Q
Darian Cruz (PUR)	Q

=== 65 kg ===
1 March

Round of 16
Matías Muñoz (CHI)	0
Austin Gómez (MEX)	10
Sixto Auccapiña (PER)	0
Lachlan McNeil (CAN)	10
Álbaro Rudesindo (DOM)	10
Elkin España (COL)	0
Alejandro Valdés (CUB)	10
Matheus Barreto (BRA)	0

Quarterfinals
Nick Lee (USA)	12
Austin Gómez (MEX)	22
Lachlan McNeil (CAN)	12
Josh Kramer (ECU)	1
Shannon Hanna (BAH)	4
Álbaro Rudesindo (DOM)	2
Alejandro Valdés (CUB)	10
Agustín Destribats (ARG)	6

Semifinals
Austin Gómez (MEX)	6
Lachlan McNeil (CAN)	3
Shannon Hanna (BAH)	0
Alejandro Valdés (CUB)	11

Qualified athletes
Austin Gómez (MEX)	Q
Alejandro Valdés (CUB)	Q

=== 74 kg ===
1 March

Round of 16
Dylan Palacio (URU)	2
Cesar Alvan (BRA)	12
Hernán Guzmán (COL)	1
Raúl Palacios (MEX)	2
Stone Lewis (CAN)	0
Sonny Santiago (PUR)	10

Quarterfinals
Julio Rodríguez (DOM)	12
Cesar Alvan (BRA)	3
Luis Barrios (HON)	4
Geandry Garzón (CUB)	14
Ángel Cortés (PAN)	0
Raúl Palacios (MEX)	5^{F}
Sonny Santiago (PUR)	2
Anthony Montero (VEN)	6

Semifinals
Julio Rodríguez (DOM)	2
Geandry Garzón (CUB)	6
Raúl Palacios (MEX)	0
Anthony Montero (VEN)	11

Qualified athletes
Geandry Garzón (CUB)	Q
Anthony Montero (VEN)	Q

=== 86 kg ===
1 March

Round of 16
Pedro Gonçalves (BRA)	4
Pool Ambrocio (PER)	6
Yurieski Torreblanca (CUB)	10
Anthony Valencia (MEX)	6^{F}

Quarterfinals
Carlos Izquierdo (COL)	10
Pool Ambrocio (PER)	0
Eduardo Gajardo (CHI)	0
Ethan Ramos (PUR)	4^{F}
Jorge Llano (ARG)	0
Alex Moore (CAN)	11
Anthony Valencia (MEX)	5
Pedro Ceballos (VEN)	8

Semifinals
Carlos Izquierdo (COL)	6
Ethan Ramos (PUR)	11
Alex Moore (CAN)	4^{F}
Pedro Ceballos (VEN)	0

Qualified athletes
Ethan Ramos (PUR)	Q
Alex Moore (CAN)	Q

=== 97 kg ===
1 March

Round of 16
Ricardo Báez (ARG)	10
Matías Uribe (CHI)	0
Marcos Santos (PUR)	1
Pedro Garay (MEX)	5^{F}

Quarterfinals
Cristian Sarco (VEN)	10
Ricardo Báez (ARG)	6^{R}
Ailton Rocha (BRA)	1
Luis Miguel Pérez (DOM)	11
Arturo Silot (CUB)	10
Nishan Randhawa (CAN)	0
Pedro Garay (MEX)	0
Maxwell Lacey (CRC)	12

Semifinals
Cristian Sarco (VEN)	2
Luis Miguel Pérez (DOM)	4
Arturo Silot (CUB)	12
Maxwell Lacey (CRC)	0

Qualified athletes
Luis Miguel Pérez (DOM)	Q
Arturo Silot (CUB)	Q

=== 125 kg ===
1 March

Round of 16
Miguel Sánchez (MEX)	4
Gabriel Silva (BRA)	8
Amar Dhesi (CAN)	11
Aaron Johnson (JAM)	0

Quarterfinals
Jonovan Smith (PUR)	2^{F}
Gabriel Silva (BRA)	0
Jhoan Ocoro (COL)	0
Gino Ávila (HON)	11
Ibrain Torres (CUB)	4
Elison Adames (DOM)	1
Amar Dhesi (CAN)	13
José Daniel Díaz (VEN)	2

Semifinals
Jonovan Smith (PUR)	5
Gino Ávila (HON)	1
Ibrain Torres (CUB)	0
Amar Dhesi (CAN)	11

Qualified athletes
Jonovan Smith (PUR)	Q
Amar Dhesi (CAN)	Q

== Men's Greco-Roman ==
=== 60 kg ===
28 February

Round of 16
Alexis Rodríguez (MEX)	9
Keeyan Trotman (CAN)	0

Quarterfinals
Raiber Rodríguez (VEN)	5
Alexis Rodríguez (MEX)	1
Cristóbal Torres (CHI)	0
Dicther Toro (COL)	8
Yerony Liria (DOM)	12
Erivan Rocha (BRA)	3
Kevin de Armas (CUB)	7
Ildar Hafizov (USA)	3

Semifinals
Raiber Rodríguez (VEN)	9
Dicther Toro (COL)	1
Yerony Liria (DOM)	0
Kevin de Armas (CUB)	10

Qualified athletes
Raiber Rodríguez (VEN)	Q
Kevin de Armas (CUB)	Q

=== 67 kg ===
28 February

Round of 16
Mauricio Lovera (ARG)	3
Luis Centeno (PUR)	12
Calebe Ferreira (BRA)	8
Alejandro Varela (GUA)	0
Starlin Laguerre (DOM)	9
Nilton Soto (PER)	5
Esli Martínez (MEX)	8
Gavin Eldridge (CAN)	0

Quarterfinals
Alejandro Sancho (USA)	4
Luis Centeno (PUR)	0
Calebe Ferreira (BRA)	3
Néstor Almanza (CHI)	4
Andrés Montaño (ECU)	9
Starlin Laguerre (DOM)	0
Esli Martínez (MEX)	2
Julián Horta (COL)	5

Semifinals
Alejandro Sancho (USA)	1
Néstor Almanza (CHI)	6^{F}
Andrés Montaño (ECU)	2
Julián Horta (COL)	1

Qualified athletes
Néstor Almanza (CHI)	Q
Andrés Montaño (ECU)	Q

=== 77 kg ===
28 February

Round of 16
Alvis Almendra (PAN)	5
John Yeats (CAN)	5
Eduardo Bernal (CHI)	0
David Choc (GUA)	8
Jon Viruet (PUR)	1
Wuileixis Rivas (VEN)	12
Arsen Julfalakyan (ARG)	5
Emmanuel Benítez (MEX)	0

Quarterfinals
Yosvanys Peña (CUB)	8
John Yeats (CAN)	0
David Choc (GUA)	1
Joílson Júnior (BRA)	10
Jair Cuero (COL)	9
Wuileixis Rivas (VEN)	0
Arsen Julfalakyan (ARG)	2
Kamal Bey (USA)	4

Semifinals
Yosvanys Peña (CUB)	11
Joílson Júnior (BRA)	1
Jair Cuero (COL)	6
Kamal Bey (USA)	4

Qualified athletes
Yosvanys Peña (CUB)	Q
Jair Cuero (COL)	Q

=== 87 kg ===
28 February

Quarterfinals		Semifinals		Qualified athletes
Daniel Grégorich (CUB)	9
José Moreno (CHI)	0	Daniel Grégorich (CUB)	3
Spencer Woods (USA)	6^{F}	Spencer Woods (USA)	6
Ariel Alfonso (HON)	0			Spencer Woods (USA)	Q
Carlos Muñoz (COL)	9			Carlos Muñoz (COL)	Q
Ronisson Brandão (BRA)	1	Carlos Muñoz (COL)	11
José Andrés Vargas (MEX)	1	Luis Avendaño (VEN)	1
Luis Avendaño (VEN)	5

=== 97 kg ===
28 February

Quarterfinals		Semifinals		Qualified athletes
Kevin Mejía (HON)	9
Kauan Gomes (BRA)	0	Kevin Mejía (HON)	10
Héctor Rodríguez (MEX)	3	Carlos Adames (DOM)	0
Carlos Adames (DOM)	12			Kevin Mejía (HON)	Q
Luillys Pérez (VEN)	9			Alan Vera (USA)	Q
Ricardo Gómez (ARG)	0	Luillys Pérez (VEN)	1
Max Madrid (PAN)	0	Alan Vera (USA)	7
Alan Vera (USA)	10

=== 130 kg ===
28 February

Pos	Athlete	Pld	W	L	CP	TP	USA	BRA	CAN
1	Cohlton Schultz (USA)	2	2	0	10	6	—	4–0 Fall	2–0 Fall
2	Eduard Soghomonyan (BRA)	2	1	1	5	11	0–5 FA	—	11–7 Fall
3	Jorawar Dhinsa (CAN)	2	0	2	0	7	0–5 FA	0–5 FA	—

Source: UWW

Pos	Athlete	Pld	W	L	CP	TP	CHI	VEN	MEX
1	Yasmani Acosta (CHI)	2	2	0	8	18	—	9–0	9–0
2	Moisés Pérez (VEN)	2	1	1	3	5	0–4 SU	—	5–0
3	Paúl Morales (MEX)	2	0	2	0	0	0–4 SU	0–3 PO	—

Source: UWW

Semifinals		Qualified athletes
Cohlton Schultz (USA)	2
Moisés Pérez (VEN)	1	Cohlton Schultz (USA)	Q
Yasmani Acosta (CHI)	5	Yasmani Acosta (CHI)	Q
Eduard Soghomonyan (BRA)	0

== Women's freestyle ==
=== 50 kg ===
29 February

Round of 16
Maia Cabrera (ARG)	0
Mariana Díaz (MEX)	10
Yusneylys Guzmán (CUB)	10^{F}
Karla Hernández (ESA)	0

Quarterfinals
Alisson Cardozo (COL)	6
Mariana Díaz (MEX)	2
Kamila Barbosa (BRA)	1
Yorlenis Morán (PAN)	3
Mariana Rojas (VEN)	2
Geneviève Morrison (CAN)	5
Yusneylys Guzmán (CUB)	6
Jacqueline Mollocana (ECU)	4

Semifinals
Alisson Cardozo (COL)	9
Yorlenis Morán (PAN)	9
Geneviève Morrison (CAN)	2
Yusneylys Guzmán (CUB)	6

Qualified athletes
Alisson Cardozo (COL)	Q
Yusneylys Guzmán (CUB)	Q

=== 53 kg ===
29 February

Round of 16
Yusneiry Agrazal (PAN)	0
Antonia Valdés (CHI)	10
Sabrina Tapajós (BRA)	17
Nathaly Herrera (PER)	5
Eva González (COL)	3
Zeltzin Hernández (MEX)	5

Quarterfinals
Dominique Parrish (USA)	10
Antonia Valdés (CHI)	0
Laura Herin (CUB)	8
Karla Godinez (CAN)	2
María González (DOM)	0
Sabrina Tapajós (BRA)	7
Zeltzin Hernández (MEX)	4
Betzabeth Argüello (VEN)	7

Semifinals
Dominique Parrish (USA)	9
Laura Herin (CUB)	6
Sabrina Tapajós (BRA)	0
Betzabeth Argüello (VEN)	4^{F}

Qualified athletes
Dominique Parrish (USA)	Q
Betzabeth Argüello (VEN)	Q

=== 57 kg ===
29 February

Round of 16
Yocleidy Ramírez (DOM)	0
Ángela Álvarez (CUB)	3
Camila Amarilla (ARG)	2
Andrea González (COL)	4

Quarterfinals
Giullia Penalber (BRA)	7
Ángela Álvarez (CUB)	8
Betzabeth Sarco (VEN)	0
Luisa Valverde (ECU)	5^{F}
Hannah Taylor (CAN)	10
Jacqueline Hernández (ESA)	0
Andrea González (COL)	4
Alma Valencia (MEX)	3^{F}

Semifinals
Ángela Álvarez (CUB)	2
Luisa Valverde (ECU)	6^{F}
Hannah Taylor (CAN)	8
Alma Valencia (MEX)	4

Qualified athletes
Luisa Valverde (ECU)	Q
Hannah Taylor (CAN)	Q

=== 62 kg ===
29 February

Round of 16
María Santana (CUB)	11
Carina Giangeruso (PUR)	0

Quarterfinals
Kayla Miracle (USA)	2^{F}
María Santana (CUB)	0
Melanie Jiménez (MEX)	0
Astrid Montero (VEN)	11
Laís Nunes (BRA)	12
Katherine Rentería (COL)	0
Sierra Brown Ton (JAM)	0
Ana Godinez (CAN)	10

Semifinals
Kayla Miracle (USA)	3
Astrid Montero (VEN)	0
Laís Nunes (BRA)	3
Ana Godinez (CAN)	3

Qualified athletes
Kayla Miracle (USA)	Q
Ana Godinez (CAN)	Q

=== 68 kg ===
29 February

Round of 16
Ámbar Garnica (MEX)	5
Thamires Machado (BRA)	8

Quarterfinals
Nicoll Parrado (COL)	2
Thamires Machado (BRA)	4
Amit Elor (USA)	12
Brenda Sterling (CUB)	1
Leonela Ayoví (ECU)	6
Virginia Jiménez (CHI)	12
Linda Morais (CAN)	9
Soleymi Caraballo (VEN)	4^{F}

Semifinals
Thamires Machado (BRA)	4
Amit Elor (USA)	10
Virginia Jiménez (CHI)	2
Soleymi Caraballo (VEN)	8

Qualified athletes
Amit Elor (USA)	Q
Soleymi Caraballo (VEN)	Q

=== 76 kg ===
29 February

Quarterfinals		Semifinals		Qualified athletes
Justina Di Stasio (CAN)	2^{F}
Saidy Chávez (HON)	0	Justina Di Stasio (CAN)	8
Meiriele Hora (BRA)	0	Linda Machuca (ARG)	4
Linda Machuca (ARG)	10			Justina Di Stasio (CAN)	Q
María Acosta (VEN)	14			Génesis Reasco (ECU)	Q
Atzimba Landaverde (MEX)	4	María Acosta (VEN)	0
Emelyn Bautista (DOM)	0	Génesis Reasco (ECU)	5
Génesis Reasco (ECU)	10
