= 2018 Pan American Wrestling Championships =

2018 Pan American Championship
- Host city: Lima, Peru
- Dates: 3–6 May

Champions
- Freestyle: United States
- Greco-Roman: United States
- Women: United States

The 2018 Pan American Wrestling Championships was held in Lima, Peru, from 3 to 6 May 2018.

The top three countries in the 18 weight categories scheduled to be held at the 2019 Pan American Games (also in Lima) qualified for the games.

== Medal table ==
* Host nation (Peru)

Rank	Nation	Gold	Silver	Bronze	Total
1	United States (USA)	14	6	5	25
2	Cuba (CUB)	10	3	4	17
3	Venezuela (VEN)	2	3	4	9
4	Canada (CAN)	1	4	7	12
5	Mexico (MEX)	1	2	2	5
6	Brazil (BRA)	1	1	3	5
7	Puerto Rico (PUR)	1	1	1	3
8	Colombia (COL)	0	5	4	9
9	Peru (PER)*	0	2	6	8
10	Dominican Republic (DOM)	0	1	3	4
10	Ecuador (ECU)	0	1	3	4
12	Honduras (HON)	0	1	1	2
13	Argentina (ARG)	0	0	2	2
14	Chile (CHI)	0	0	1	1
14	El Salvador (ESA)	0	0	1	1
14	Guatemala (GUA)	0	0	1	1
Totals (16 entries)		30	30	48	108

== Team ranking ==
Rank	Men's freestyle		Men's Greco-Roman		Women's freestyle	
Rank	Team	Points	Team	Points	Team	Points
1	United States	230	United States	141	United States	198
2	Cuba	130	Cuba	140	Canada	155
3	Canada	123	Brazil	106	Cuba	106
4	Colombia	84	Peru	105	Brazil	72
5	Peru	81	Venezuela	98	Ecuador	70
6	Dominican Republic	64	Mexico	69	Mexico	68
7	Mexico	62	Dominican Republic	67	Colombia	67
8	Venezuela	56	Colombia	53	Venezuela	62
9	Argentina	54	Honduras	43	Peru	52
10	Puerto Rico	36	Canada	42	Puerto Rico	35

== Medalists ==
=== Men's freestyle ===
Event	Gold	Silver	Bronze
57 kg	Reineri Andreu; Cuba	Óscar Tigreros; Colombia	Thomas Gilman; United States
57 kg	Reineri Andreu; Cuba	Óscar Tigreros; Colombia	Juan Ramirez; Dominican Republic
61 kg	Joe Colon; United States	Joshua Bodnarchuk; Canada	Juan Rodriguez; El Salvador
65 kg	Logan Stieber; United States	Abel Herrera; Peru	Alejandro Valdes; Cuba
65 kg	Logan Stieber; United States	Abel Herrera; Peru	Álbaro Rudesindo; Dominican Republic
70 kg	James Green; United States	Hernan Guzman; Colombia	Alexander Chaves; Canada
74 kg	Liván López; Cuba	Nazar Kulchytskyy; United States	Nestor Tafur; Colombia
74 kg	Liván López; Cuba	Nazar Kulchytskyy; United States	Jorge Llano; Argentina
79 kg	Mark Hall; United States	Ethan Ramos; Puerto Rico	Santiago Restrepo; Colombia
79 kg	Mark Hall; United States	Ethan Ramos; Puerto Rico	Shawn Daye Finley; Canada
86 kg	David Taylor; United States	Yurieski Torreblanca; Cuba	Pool Ambrocio; Peru
86 kg	David Taylor; United States	Yurieski Torreblanca; Cuba	Pedro Ceballos; Venezuela
92 kg	Ben Provisor; United States	Esdras Lopez; Mexico	Dalton Webb; Canada
97 kg	Reineris Salas; Cuba	Kyven Gadson; United States	Jordan Steen; Canada
97 kg	Reineris Salas; Cuba	Kyven Gadson; United States	Jose Diaz Robertti; Venezuela
125 kg	Nick Gwiazdowski; United States	Yudenny Alpajon; Cuba	Catriel Muriel; Argentina
125 kg	Nick Gwiazdowski; United States	Yudenny Alpajon; Cuba	Korey Jarvis; Canada

=== Men's Greco-Roman ===
Event	Gold	Silver	Bronze
55 kg	Sargis Khachatryan; Brazil	Max Nowry; United States	Brandon Jesus Escobar; Honduras
60 kg	Luis Orta; Cuba	Jancel Pimental; Dominican Republic	Marat Garipov; Brazil
60 kg	Luis Orta; Cuba	Jancel Pimental; Dominican Republic	Andres Montano Arroyo; Ecuador
63 kg	Ryan Mango; United States	Gerardo Oliva Montes; Peru	German Diaz; Puerto Rico
67 kg	Ismael Borrero; Cuba	Manuel Lopez Salcero; Mexico	Mario Molina Cortez; Peru
67 kg	Ismael Borrero; Cuba	Manuel Lopez Salcero; Mexico	Joílson Júnior; Brazil
72 kg	Ravaughn Perkins; United States	Wuileixis Rivas; Venezuela	Christopher Palacios; Peru
77 kg	Ariel Fis Batista; Cuba	Jair Cuero Munoz; Colombia	Reinier Jimenez Terry; Guatemala
77 kg	Ariel Fis Batista; Cuba	Jair Cuero Munoz; Colombia	Angelo Marques; Brazil
82 kg	Luis Avendaño; Venezuela	Geordan Speiller; United States	Carlos Espinoza; Peru
87 kg	Daniel Hechavarria; Cuba	Yorgen Cova Pulido; Venezuela	Carlos Adames; Dominican Republic
87 kg	Daniel Hechavarria; Cuba	Yorgen Cova Pulido; Venezuela	Ben Provisor; United States
97 kg	Luillys Perez; Venezuela	Kevin Mejia; Honduras	Gabriel Rosillo; Cuba
97 kg	Luillys Perez; Venezuela	Kevin Mejia; Honduras	Oscar Loango; Colombia
130 kg	Óscar Pino; Cuba	Robert Smith; United States	Luis Roman Barrios; Mexico
130 kg	Óscar Pino; Cuba	Robert Smith; United States	Yasmani Acosta; Chile

=== Women's freestyle ===
Event	Gold	Silver	Bronze
50 kg	Whitney Conder; United States	Carolina Castillo; Colombia	Mariana Díaz Muñoz; Mexico
50 kg	Whitney Conder; United States	Carolina Castillo; Colombia	Jade Dufour; Canada
53 kg	Sarah Hildebrandt; United States	Luisa Valverde; Ecuador	Lilianet Duanes; Cuba
53 kg	Sarah Hildebrandt; United States	Luisa Valverde; Ecuador	Betzabeth Argüello; Venezuela
55 kg	Becka Leathers; United States	Cara Nania; Canada	Lady Moran; Ecuador
57 kg	Alejandra Bonilla; Mexico	Lianna Montero; Cuba	Alexandria Town; Canada
57 kg	Alejandra Bonilla; Mexico	Lianna Montero; Cuba	Michaela Beck; United States
59 kg	Andribeth Belliard; Puerto Rico	Laurence Beauregard; Canada	Kelsey Campbell; United States
62 kg	Yaquelin Estornell; Cuba	Laís Nunes; Brazil	Kayla Miracle; United States
62 kg	Yaquelin Estornell; Cuba	Laís Nunes; Brazil	Jackeline Rentería; Colombia
65 kg	Forrest Molinari; United States	Breanne Graham; Canada	Only two competitors
68 kg	Yudaris Sánchez; Cuba	Soleymi Caraballo; Venezuela	Yanet Sovero; Peru
68 kg	Yudaris Sánchez; Cuba	Soleymi Caraballo; Venezuela	Leonela Ayoví; Ecuador
72 kg	Veronica Keefe; Canada	Diana Cruz; Peru	Hanna Gladden; United States
76 kg	Adeline Gray; United States	Andrea Olaya; Colombia	Andrimar Lazaro; Venezuela
76 kg	Adeline Gray; United States	Andrea Olaya; Colombia	Mabelkis Capote; Cuba

== See also ==
- Wrestling at the 2019 Pan American Games – Qualification
