= Wrestling at the 2022 South American Games =

Wrestling competitions at the 2022 South American Games

- Venue: Pavilion 3 of SND
- Dates: October 12−14
- Nations: 12

Wrestling competitions at the 2022 South American Games in Asunción, Paraguay were held between October 12 and 14, 2022 at the Pavilion 3 of SND.

== Schedule ==
The competition schedule is as follows:

| F | Final |

Men's freestyle
| Date Event | Wed 12 | Thu 13 | Fri 14 |
|---|---|---|---|
| Men's freestyle 57 kg | | | F |
| Men's freestyle 65 kg | | | F |
| Men's freestyle 74 kg | | | F |
| Men's freestyle 86 kg | | | F |
| Men's freestyle 97 kg | | | F |
| Men's freestyle 125 kg | | | F |

Men's Greco-Roman
| Date Event | Wed 12 | Thu 13 | Fri 14 |
|---|---|---|---|
| Men's Greco-Roman 60 kg | F | | |
| Men's Greco-Roman 67 kg | F | | |
| Men's Greco-Roman 77 kg | F | | |
| Men's Greco-Roman 87 kg | F | | |
| Men's Greco-Roman 97 kg | F | | |
| Men's Greco-Roman 130 kg | F | | |

Women's freestyle
| Date Event | Wed 12 | Thu 13 | Fri 14 |
|---|---|---|---|
| Women's freestyle 50 kg | | F | |
| Women's freestyle 53 kg | | F | |
| Women's freestyle 57 kg | | F | |
| Women's freestyle 62 kg | | F | |
| Women's freestyle 69 kg | | F | |
| Women's freestyle 76 kg | | F | |

== Medal summary ==
=== Medal table ===
* Host nation (Paraguay)

| Rank | Nation | Gold | Silver | Bronze | Total |
|---|---|---|---|---|---|
| 1 | Venezuela (VEN) | 6 | 7 | 5 | 18 |
| 2 | Colombia (COL) | 4 | 1 | 6 | 11 |
| 3 | Ecuador (ECU) | 4 | 1 | 0 | 5 |
| 4 | Argentina (ARG) | 2 | 1 | 1 | 4 |
| 5 | Brazil (BRA) | 1 | 6 | 4 | 11 |
| 6 | Chile (CHI) | 1 | 0 | 2 | 3 |
| 7 | Peru (PER) | 0 | 2 | 3 | 5 |
| 8 | Panama (PAN) | 0 | 0 | 3 | 3 |
| Totals (8 entries) | | 18 | 18 | 24 | 60 |

=== Medalists ===
==== Men's freestyle ====
| Event | Gold | Silver | Bronze |
|---|---|---|---|
| 57 kg | Óscar Tigreros; Colombia | Pedro Mejías; Venezuela | Enrique Herrera; Peru |
| 65 kg | Agustín Destribats; Argentina | Wilfredo Rodríguez; Venezuela | Wilfredo López; Panama |
| 65 kg | Agustín Destribats; Argentina | Wilfredo Rodríguez; Venezuela | Uber Cuero; Colombia |
| 74 kg | Anthony Montero; Venezuela | César Bordeaux; Brazil | Juan David Sánchez; Colombia |
| 74 kg | Anthony Montero; Venezuela | César Bordeaux; Brazil | Ángel Cortés; Panama |
| 86 kg | Pedro Ceballos; Venezuela | Carlos Angulo; Colombia | Giovanni Piazza; Brazil |
| 86 kg | Pedro Ceballos; Venezuela | Carlos Angulo; Colombia | Jorge Llano; Argentina |
| 97 kg | Ricardo Báez; Argentina | Cristian Sarco; Venezuela | Matías Uribe; Chile |
| 125 kg | José Díaz Roberti; Venezuela | Catriel Pehuén; Argentina | Guilherme Pradella; Brazil |

==== Men's Greco-Roman ====
| Event | Gold | Silver | Bronze |
|---|---|---|---|
| 60 kg | Dicther Toro; Colombia | Jeremy Peralta; Ecuador | Raiber Rodríguez; Venezuela |
| 67 kg | Julián Horta; Colombia | Kenedy Pedrosa; Brazil | Shalon Villegas; Venezuela |
| 67 kg | Julián Horta; Colombia | Kenedy Pedrosa; Brazil | Cristóbal Torres; Chile |
| 77 kg | Jair Cuero; Colombia | Joílson Júnior; Brazil | Wuileixis Rivas; Venezuela |
| 87 kg | Luis Avendaño; Venezuela | Pool Ambrocio; Peru | Ronisson Brandão; Brazil |
| 97 kg | Luillys Pérez; Venezuela | Igor Queiroz; Brazil | Haner Ramírez; Colombia |
| 130 kg | Yasmani Acosta; Chile | Brayan Loyo; Venezuela | Rodolfo Waithe; Panama |

==== Women's freestyle ====
| Event | Gold | Silver | Bronze |
|---|---|---|---|
| 50 kg | Jacqueline Mollocana; Ecuador | Mariana Rojas; Venezuela | Nathaly Herrera; Peru |
| 53 kg | Lucía Yépez; Ecuador | Thalía Mallqui; Peru | Gracyenne Alves; Brazil |
| 53 kg | Lucía Yépez; Ecuador | Thalía Mallqui; Peru | Betzabeth Argüello; Venezuela |
| 57 kg | Luisa Valverde; Ecuador | Giullia Penalber; Brazil | Yohelyn Fernández; Venezuela |
| 57 kg | Luisa Valverde; Ecuador | Giullia Penalber; Brazil | Tatiana Hurtado; Colombia |
| 62 kg | Laís Nunes; Brazil | Nathaly Grimán; Venezuela | Andrea González; Colombia |
| 68 kg | Soleymi Caraballo; Venezuela | Thamires Machado; Brazil | Yanet Sovero; Peru |
| 76 kg | Génesis Reasco; Ecuador | María Acosta; Venezuela | Tatiana Rentería; Colombia |

== Participation ==
Twelve nations participated in wrestling of the 2022 South American Games.

- Argentina
- Bolivia
- Brazil
- Chile
- Colombia
- Ecuador
- Panama
- Paraguay
- Peru
- Suriname
- Uruguay
- Venezuela
