= Luisa Valverde =

Ecuadorian freestyle wrestler

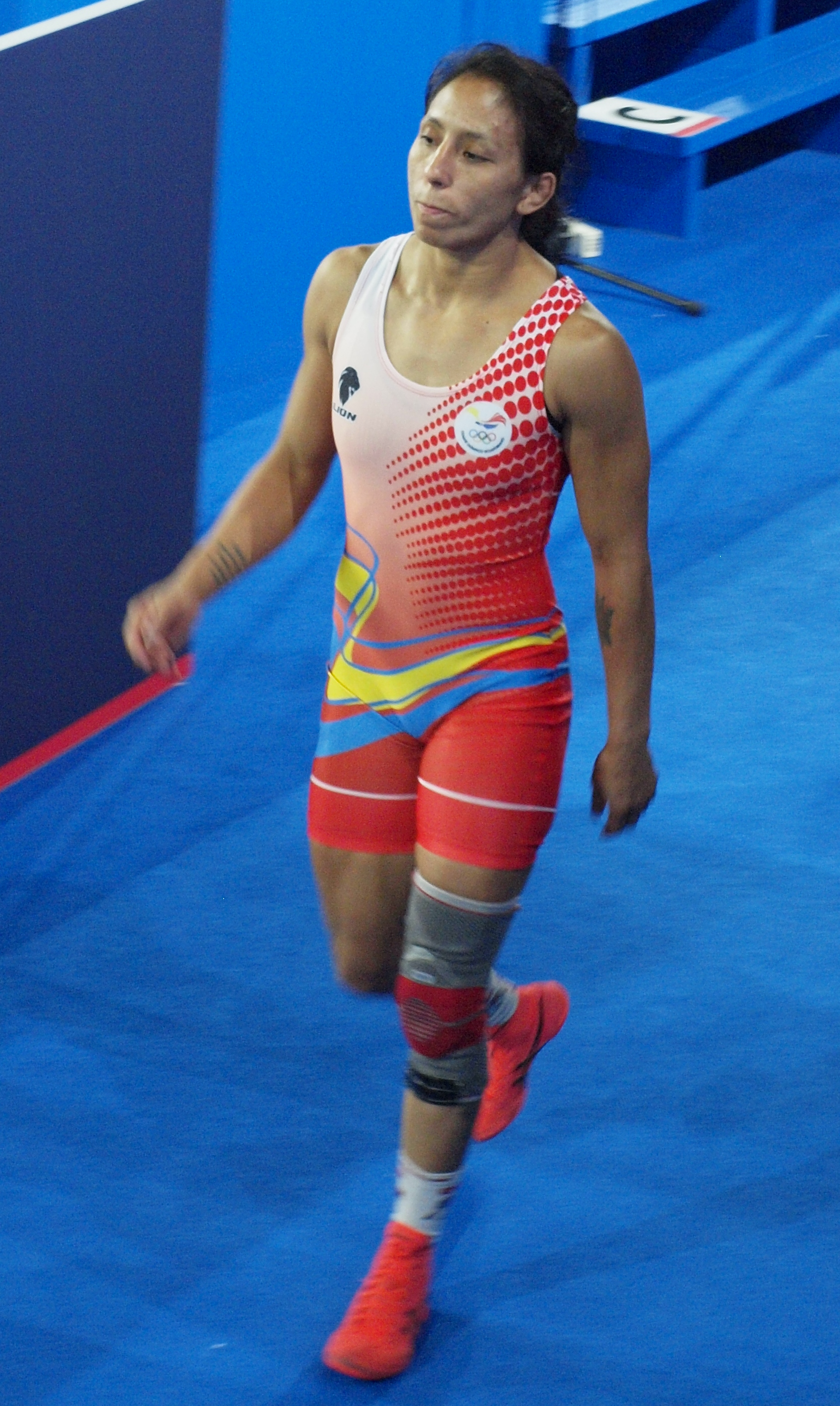
- Luisa Valverde at the 2021 World Wrestling Championships in Oslo, Norway

Personal information
- Full name: Luisa Elizabeth Valverde Melendres
- Born: 4 July 1991 (age 35) Babahoyo, Ecuador

Sport
- Country: Ecuador
- Sport: Amateur wrestling
- Weight class: 53 kg; 55 kg; 57 kg
- Event: Freestyle
Medal record
Women's freestyle wrestling
Representing Ecuador
Pan American Games
Bronze medal – third place	2023 Santiago	57 kg
Pan American Championships
Gold medal – first place	2014 Mexico City	55 kg
Gold medal – first place	2020 Ottawa	53 kg
Gold medal – first place	2023 Buenos Aires	57 kg
Silver medal – second place	2015 Santiago	55 kg
Silver medal – second place	2016 Frisco	55 kg
Silver medal – second place	2018 Lima	53 kg
Silver medal – second place	2019 Buenos Aires	53 kg
Silver medal – second place	2021 Guatemala City	53 kg
Silver medal – second place	2022 Acapulco	53 kg
Silver medal – second place	2026 Coralville	57 kg
Bronze medal – third place	2011 Rionegro	48 kg
Bronze medal – third place	2017 Lauro de Freitas	53 kg
Bronze medal – third place	2024 Acapulco	57 kg
Bronze medal – third place	2025 Monterrey	57 kg
South American Games
Gold medal – first place	2018 Cochabamba	53 kg
Gold medal – first place	2022 Asunción	57 kg
Bronze medal – third place	2010 Medellín	51 kg
Bolivarian Games
Gold medal – first place	2022 Valledupar	57 kg
Bronze medal – third place	2013 Trujillo	51 kg
Bronze medal – third place	2017 Santa Marta	53 kg
Dan Kolov - Nikola Petrov Tournament
Gold medal – first place	2023 Sofia	55 kg
Grand Prix
Bronze medal – third place	2023 Alexandria	57 kg
Bronze medal – third place	2025 Tirana	57 kg

Luisa Elizabeth Valverde Melendres (born 4 July 1991) is an Ecuadorian freestyle wrestler. She is a two-time gold medalist at the South American Games (2018 and 2022) and a bronze medalist at the 2023 Pan American Games held in Santiago, Chile. She also won medals at the Pan American Wrestling Championships.

== Career ==
Valverde won one of the bronze medals in the women's 51 kg event at the 2010 South American Games held in Medellín, Colombia.

Valverde won the gold medal in the 55 kg event at the 2014 Pan American Wrestling Championships held in Mexico City, Mexico. At the 2017 Pan American Wrestling Championships held in Lauro de Freitas, Brazil, she won one of the bronze medals in the 53 kg event.

In March 2020, Valverde competed at the Pan American Olympic Qualification Tournament held in Ottawa, Canada hoping to qualify for the 2020 Summer Olympics in Tokyo, Japan. She did not qualify at this tournament and she also failed to qualify for the Olympics at the 2021 World Olympic Qualification Tournament held in Sofia, Bulgaria.

Valverde won the silver medal in her event at the 2021 Dan Kolov & Nikola Petrov Tournament held in Plovdiv, Bulgaria. In May 2021, she won the silver medal in the women's 53 kg event at the 2021 Pan American Wrestling Championships held in Guatemala City, Guatemala. A month later, she was able to qualify to represent Ecuador at the 2020 Summer Olympics after qualified wrestler Pak Yong-mi of North Korea was no longer able to compete. Due to COVID-19, North Korea's decided to withdraw entirely from the 2020 Summer Olympics. She competed in the women's 53 kg event. She won her first match against Maria Prevolaraki of Greece and she was then eliminated in her next match by Bat-Ochiryn Bolortuyaa of Mongolia.

Two months after the Olympics, Valverde lost her bronze medal match in the women's 53 kg event at the 2021 World Wrestling Championships held in Oslo, Norway. She won the silver medal in her event at the 2022 Pan American Wrestling Championships held in Acapulco, Mexico.

Valverde won the gold medal in her event at the 2022 Bolivarian Games held in Valledupar, Colombia. She was eliminated in her first match in the 55 kg event at the 2022 World Wrestling Championships held in Belgrade, Serbia. She won the gold medal in her event at the 2022 South American Games held in Asunción, Paraguay.

Valverde won the silver medal in the women's 55 kg event at the Grand Prix de France Henri Deglane 2023 held in Nice, France.

Valverde won one of the bronze medals in the women's 57 kg event at the 2023 Ibrahim Moustafa Tournament held in Alexandria, Egypt. She won the gold medal in her event at the 2023 Dan Kolov & Nikola Petrov Tournament held in Sofia, Bulgaria. Two months later, she also won the gold medal in her event at the 2023 Pan American Wrestling Championships held in Buenos Aires, Argentina. Valverde won one of the bronze medals in the women's 57 kg event at the 2023 Pan American Games held in Santiago, Chile. She defeated Betzabeth Sarco of Venezuela in her bronze medal match.

Valverde won a bronze medal in the women's 57 kg event at the 2024 Pan American Wrestling Championships held in Acapulco, Mexico. A few days later, at the Pan American Wrestling Olympic Qualification Tournament held in Acapulco, Mexico, she earned a quota place for Ecuador for the 2024 Summer Olympics held in Paris, France. She competed in the women's 57 kg event at the Olympics. Valverde lost her second match against Tsugumi Sakurai of Japan and she was eliminated in the repechage by Hannah Taylor of Canada.

== Achievements ==
Year	Tournament	Location	Result	Event
2010	South American Games	Medellín, Colombia	3rd	Freestyle 51 kg
2011	Pan American Wrestling Championships	Rionegro, Colombia	3rd	Freestyle 48 kg
2013	Bolivarian Games	Trujillo, Peru	3rd	Freestyle 51 kg
2014	Pan American Wrestling Championships	Mexico City, Mexico	1st	Freestyle 55 kg
2015	Pan American Wrestling Championships	Santiago, Chile	2nd	Freestyle 55 kg
2016	Pan American Wrestling Championships	Frisco, United States	2nd	Freestyle 55 kg
2017	Pan American Wrestling Championships	Lauro de Freitas, Brazil	3rd	Freestyle 53 kg
2017	Bolivarian Games	Santa Marta, Colombia	3rd	Freestyle 53 kg
2018	Pan American Wrestling Championships	Lima, Peru	2nd	Freestyle 53 kg
2018	South American Games	Cochabamba, Bolivia	1st	Freestyle 53 kg
2019	Pan American Wrestling Championships	Buenos Aires, Argentina	2nd	Freestyle 53 kg
2020	Pan American Wrestling Championships	Ottawa, Canada	1st	Freestyle 53 kg
2021	Pan American Wrestling Championships	Guatemala City, Guatemala	2nd	Freestyle 53 kg
2022	Pan American Wrestling Championships	Acapulco, Mexico	2nd	Freestyle 53 kg
2022	Bolivarian Games	Valledupar, Colombia	1st	Freestyle 57 kg
2022	South American Games	Asunción, Paraguay	1st	Freestyle 57 kg
2023	Pan American Wrestling Championships	Buenos Aires, Argentina	1st	Freestyle 57 kg
2023	Pan American Games	Santiago, Chile	3rd	Freestyle 57 kg
2024	Pan American Wrestling Championships	Acapulco, Mexico	3rd	Freestyle 57 kg
2025	Pan American Wrestling Championships	Monterrey, Mexico	3rd	Freestyle 57 kg
2026	Pan American Wrestling Championships	Coralville, United States	2nd	Freestyle 57 kg
