= Soleymi Caraballo =

Venezuelan freestyle wrestler

Personal information
- Full name: Soleymi Antonieta Caraballo Hernández
- Born: 17 June 1994 (age 32)

Sport
- Country: Venezuela
- Sport: Amateur wrestling
- Weight class: 68 kg
- Event: Freestyle
Medal record
Women's freestyle wrestling
Representing Venezuela
Pan American Games
Silver medal – second place	2023 Santiago	68 kg
Pan American Championships
Gold medal – first place	2022 Acapulco	68 kg
Silver medal – second place	2018 Lima	68 kg
Silver medal – second place	2024 Acapulco	68 kg
Central American and Caribbean Games
Silver medal – second place	2014 Veracruz	63 kg
Silver medal – second place	2018 Barranquilla	68 kg
South American Games
Gold medal – first place	2022 Asunción	68 kg
Silver medal – second place	2018 Cochabamba	68 kg
Bronze medal – third place	2014 Santiago	63 kg
Bolivarian Games
Gold medal – first place	2017 Santa Marta	75 kg
Gold medal – first place	2022 Valledupar	68 kg

Soleymi Antonieta Caraballo Hernández (Note: In this Spanish name, the first or paternal surname is Caraballo and the second or maternal family name is Hernández.) (born 17 June 1994) is a Venezuelan freestyle wrestler. She is a gold medalist in her event at the Bolivarian Games (both in 2017 and 2022), the 2022 South American Games and the 2022 Pan American Wrestling Championships. She represented Venezuela at the 2024 Summer Olympics in Paris, France.

She won medals at the Central American and Caribbean Games (2014 and 2018) and the South American Games (2014 and 2018).

== Career ==
Caraballo competed at the Central American and Caribbean Games both in 2014 and in 2018: she won the silver medal in the women's 63 kg event in 2014 and again in the 68 kg event in 2018. She won the silver medal in her event at the 2018 Pan American Wrestling Championships held in Lima, Peru.

Caraballo competed in the women's 68 kg event at the 2018 World Wrestling Championships held in Budapest, Hungary. In 2021, she failed to qualify for the Olympics at the World Olympic Qualification Tournament held in Sofia, Bulgaria.

Caraballo won the gold medal in her event at the 2022 Pan American Wrestling Championships held in Acapulco, Mexico. She also won the gold medal in her event at the 2022 Bolivarian Games held in Valledupar, Colombia.

Caraballo won the gold medal in the women's 68 kg event at the 2022 South American Games held in Asunción, Paraguay. In 2023, she competed in her event at the Pan American Wrestling Championships held in Buenos Aires, Argentina. Caraballo won the silver medal in the women's 68 kg event at the 2023 Pan American Games held in Santiago, Chile. In the final, she lost against Forrest Molinari of the United States.

Caraballo won the silver medal in her event at the 2024 Pan American Wrestling Championships held in Acapulco, Mexico. A few days later, at the Pan American Wrestling Olympic Qualification Tournament held in Acapulco, Mexico, she earned a quota place for Venezuela for the 2024 Summer Olympics held in Paris, France. She was eliminated in her first match in the women's 68 kg event at the Olympics.

== Achievements ==
Year	Tournament	Location	Result	Event
2014	South American Games	Santiago, Chile	3rd	Freestyle 63 kg
2014	Central American and Caribbean Games	Veracruz, Mexico	2nd	Freestyle 68 kg
2017	Bolivarian Games	Santa Marta, Colombia	1st	Freestyle 75 kg
2018	Pan American Wrestling Championships	Lima, Peru	2nd	Freestyle 68 kg
2018	South American Games	Cochabamba, Bolivia	2nd	Freestyle 68 kg
2018	Central American and Caribbean Games	Barranquilla, Colombia	2nd	Freestyle 68 kg
2022	Pan American Wrestling Championships	Acapulco, Mexico	1st	Freestyle 68 kg
2022	Bolivarian Games	Valledupar, Colombia	1st	Freestyle 68 kg
2022	South American Games	Asunción, Paraguay	1st	Freestyle 68 kg
2023	Pan American Games	Santiago, Chile	2nd	Freestyle 68 kg
2024	Pan American Wrestling Championships	Acapulco, Mexico	2nd	Freestyle 68 kg
