= Julián Horta =

Colombian Greco-Roman wrestler

Personal information
- Full name: Julián Stiven Horta Acevedo
- Nationality: Colombian
- Born: 15 August 1999 (age 26) Puerto Camelia, Caquetá, Colombia

Sport
- Country: Colombia
- Sport: Amateur wrestling
- Weight class: 67 kg; 70 kg
- Events: Greco-Roman; Beach wrestling
Medal record
Representing Colombia
Event	1st	2nd	3rd
Pan American Games	0	1	0
Pan American Championships	1	0	3
CAC Games	0	0	1
South American Games	1	0	0
Bolivarian Games	0	1	1
South American Beach Games	0	1	0
U20 Pan American Championships	0	0	1
Total	2	3	6
Men's Greco-Roman wrestling
Pan American Games
Silver medal – second place	2023 Santiago	67 kg
Pan American Championships
Gold medal – first place	2022 Acapulco	67 kg
Bronze medal – third place	2023 Buenos Aires	67 kg
Bronze medal – third place	2024 Acapulco	67 kg
Bronze medal – third place	2026 Coralville	67 kg
Central American and Caribbean Games
Bronze medal – third place	2023 San Salvador	67 kg
South American Games
Gold medal – first place	2022 Asunción	67 kg
Bolivarian Games
Silver medal – second place	2025 Lima-Ayacucho	67 kg
Bronze medal – third place	2022 Valledupar	67 kg
U20 Pan American Championships
Bronze medal – third place	2019 Guatemala City	67 kg
Men's beach wrestling
South American Beach Games
Silver medal – second place	2023 Santa Marta	70 kg

Julián Stiven Horta Acevedo (Note: In this Spanish name, the first or paternal surname is Horta and the second or maternal family name is Acevedo.) (born 15 August 1999) is a Colombian of Portuguese descent Greco-Roman wrestler. He won the 2020 Pan American Wrestling Olympic Qualification Tournament in the 67 kg category, thus qualifying for the 2020 Summer Olympics in Tokyo, Japan. He competed in the 67 kg event.

Horta won the bronze medal in his event at the 2022 Bolivarian Games held in Valledupar, Colombia. He competed in the 67 kg event at the 2022 World Wrestling Championships held in Belgrade, Serbia. He won the gold medal in his event at the 2022 South American Games held in Asunción, Paraguay.

Horta won a bronze medal in his event at the 2024 Pan American Wrestling Championships held in Acapulco, Mexico. A few days later, he competed at the 2024 Pan American Wrestling Olympic Qualification Tournament held in Acapulco, Mexico hoping to qualify for the 2024 Summer Olympics in Paris, France. He was eliminated in his second match.

== Achievements ==
Year	Tournament	Location	Result	Event
Representing Colombia
2019	U20 Pan American Championships	Guatemala City, Mexico	3rd	Greco-Roman 67 kg
2022	Pan American Championships	Acapulco, Mexico	1st	Greco-Roman 67 kg
2022	Bolivarian Games	Valledupar, Colombia	3rd	Greco-Roman 67 kg
2022	South American Games	Asunción, Paraguay	1st	Greco-Roman 67 kg
2023	Pan American Championships	Buenos Aires, Argentina	3rd	Greco-Roman 67 kg
2023	Central American and Caribbean Games	San Salvador, El Salvador	3rd	Greco-Roman 67 kg
2023	South American Beach Games	Santa Marta, Colombia	2nd	Beach wrestling 70 kg
2023	Pan American Games	Santiago, Chile	2nd	Greco–Roman 67 kg
2024	Pan American Championships	Acapulco, Mexico	3rd	Greco-Roman 67 kg
2025	Bolivarian Games	Lima, Perú	2nd	Greco-Roman 67 kg
2026	Pan American Championships	Coralville, United States	3rd	Greco-Roman 67 kg
