= Joílson Júnior =

Brazilian Greco-Roman wrestler

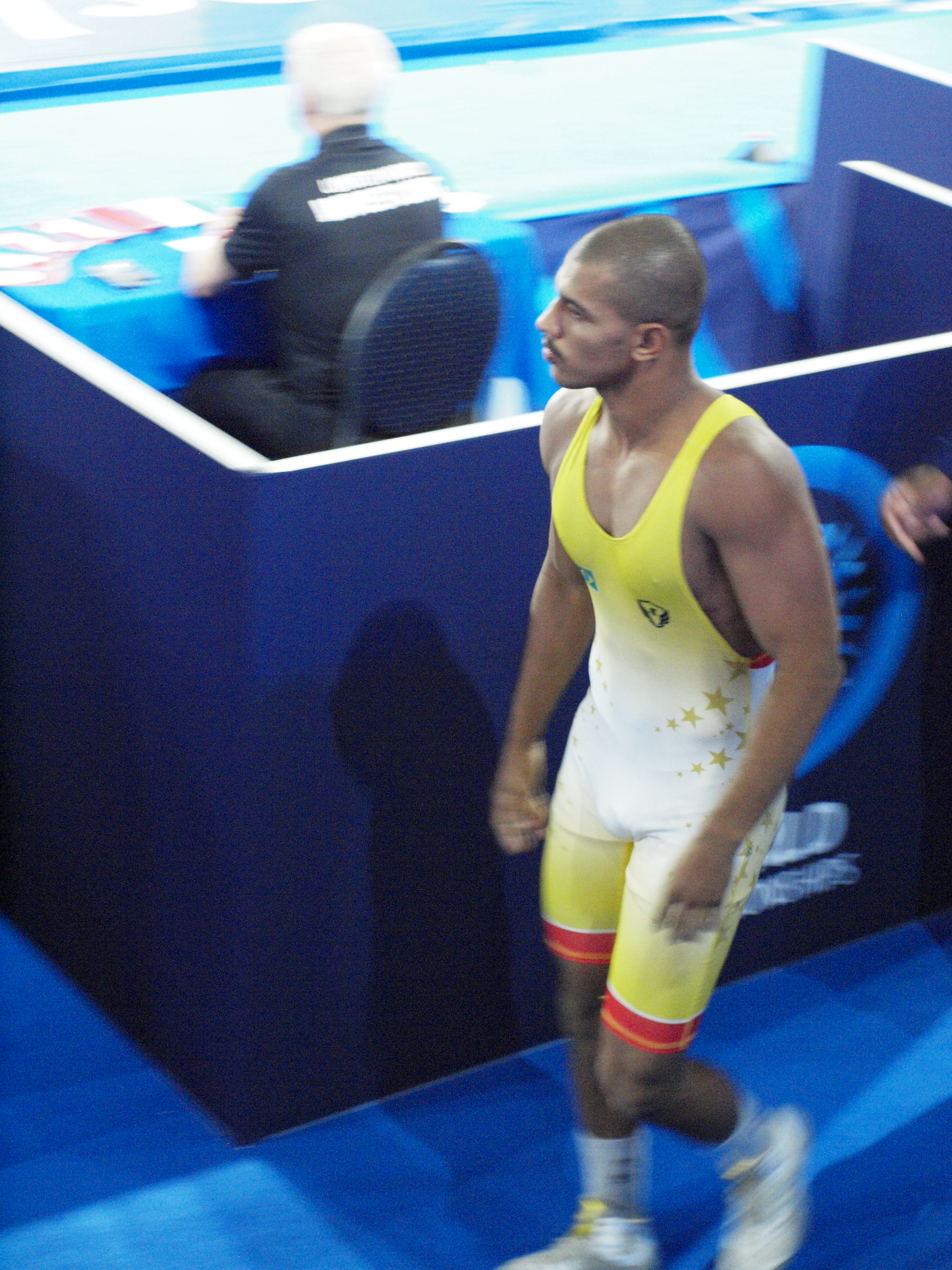
- Joílson Júnior in 2021

Personal information
- Full name: Joílson de Brito Ramos Júnior
- Born: 19 April 1998 (age 28) Niterói
- Height: 176 cm (5 ft 9 in)

Sport
- Country: Brazil
- Sport: Amateur wrestling
- Event: Greco-Roman
Medal record
Men's Greco-Roman wrestling
Representing Brazil
Pan American Games
Silver medal – second place	2023 Santiago	77 kg
Pan American Championships
Silver medal – second place	2017 Lauro de Freitas	66 kg
Silver medal – second place	2020 Ottawa	72 kg
Silver medal – second place	2021 Guatemala City	77 kg
Silver medal – second place	2024 Acapulco	77 kg
Bronze medal – third place	2018 Lima	67 kg
Bronze medal – third place	2019 Buenos Aires	67 kg
Bronze medal – third place	2022 Acapulco	77 kg
Bronze medal – third place	2026 Coralville	77 kg
South American Games
Gold medal – first place	2018 Cochabamba	67 kg
Silver medal – second place	2022 Asunción	77 kg

Joílson de Brito Ramos Júnior (born 19 April 1998) is a Brazilian Greco-Roman wrestler. He is a seven-time medalist at the Pan American Wrestling Championships. He also won the gold medal in his event at the 2018 South American Games and silver at the 2023 Pan American Games.

== Career ==
In 2017, at the age of 20, Joílson won his second Pan-American Junior Championship and a silver in the Pan American Senior Championship (over 20 years old), in addition to winning the Brazilian Junior and Senior Championships. He still participated in the 2017 World Wrestling Championships (his first World Championship), being eliminated in the first round. He was named best wrestling athlete of 2017 by the Brazilian Olympic Committee.

In May 2018, Joílson won a bronze medal at the 2018 Pan American Wrestling Championships. In June he won the gold medal at the 2018 South American Games. In August he became three-time Junior Pan-American wrestling champion. In September 2018, Joílson participated in the 2018 World Junior Wrestling Championships, held in Trnava, Slovakia. He reached the quarterfinals where he was beaten by Armenian Malkhas Amoyan, and in the repechage he lost to Ukrainian Parviz Nasibov, being eliminated. In October 2018, Joílson came close to obtaining a medal at the 2018 World Wrestling Championships, where he reached the quarterfinals, however, he lost two fights in a row, in the main draw and in the repechage, being eliminated.

In April 2019, at the 2019 Pan American Wrestling Championships held in Buenos Aires, Joilson won the bronze medal. In August 2019, he represented Brazil at the Pan American Games in the 67 kg event where he was eliminated in his first match by Ellis Coleman.

At the 2020 Pan American Wrestling Championships held in Ottawa, Canada, he won the silver medal in the 72 kg event. A year earlier, he won one of the bronze medals in the 67 kg event.

In May 2021, Joílson participated in the 2021 Pan American Wrestling Championships, moving up a category from 67 kg to 77 kg and debuting with a silver medal in the new division. In October 2021, Joílson went to the 2021 World Wrestling Championships participating for the first time in the 77 kg category, where he faced Georgian Gela Bolkvadze, being eliminated in the 1st round.

In May 2022, Joilson obtained a bronze at the 2022 Pan American Wrestling Championships. He competed in the 77 kg event at the 2022 World Wrestling Championships held in Belgrade, Serbia. He won the silver medal in his event at the 2022 South American Games held in Asunción, Paraguay.

In May 2023, Joílison participated in the 2023 Pan American Wrestling Championships, but stopped in the quarterfinals. Participating in the 2023 World Wrestling Championships in September, he was eliminated in the first round. But, at the 2023 Pan American Games, Joílson had a great campaign, reaching the final and winning silver, his first medal at the Pan American Games. Since the 2007 edition of the Pan in Rio, the Brazilian Greco-Roman style has not made a final in the tournament.

Joílison won the silver medal in his event at the 2024 Pan American Wrestling Championships held in Acapulco, Mexico. A few days later, he competed at the 2024 Pan American Wrestling Olympic Qualification Tournament held in Acapulco, Mexico hoping to qualify for the 2024 Summer Olympics in Paris, France. He was eliminated in his second match. Joílison also competed at the 2024 World Wrestling Olympic Qualification Tournament held in Istanbul, Turkey without qualifying for the Olympics. He was eliminated in his first match.

== Achievements ==
Year	Tournament	Location	Result	Event
2017	Pan American Wrestling Championships	Lauro de Freitas, Brazil	2nd	Greco-Roman 66 kg
2018	Pan American Wrestling Championships	Lima, Peru	3rd	Greco-Roman 67 kg
2018	South American Games	Cochabamba, Bolivia	1st	Greco-Roman 67 kg
2019	Pan American Wrestling Championships	Buenos Aires, Argentina	3rd	Greco-Roman 67 kg
2020	Pan American Wrestling Championships	Ottawa, Canada	2nd	Greco-Roman 72 kg
2021	Pan American Wrestling Championships	Guatemala City, Guatemala	2nd	Greco-Roman 77 kg
2022	Pan American Wrestling Championships	Acapulco, Mexico	3rd	Greco-Roman 77 kg
2022	South American Games	Asunción, Paraguay	2nd	Greco-Roman 77 kg
2023	Pan American Games	Santiago, Chile	2nd	Greco-Roman 77 kg
2024	Pan American Wrestling Championships	Acapulco, Mexico	2nd	Greco-Roman 77 kg
