= 2022 Pan American Wrestling Championships =

2022 Pan American
- Host city: Acapulco, Mexico
- Dates: 5–8 May 2022
- Stadium: Hotel Expo Mundo Imperial

Champions
- Freestyle: United States
- Greco-Roman: United States
- Women: United States

The 2022 Pan American Wrestling Championships was the 35th edition of Pan American Wrestling Championships of combined events. It was held from May 5 to 8 in Acapulco, Mexico.

The event was originally scheduled for Santiago, Chile, before being moved to Acapulco. A press release issued in February 2022 stated that "The requirement decided by the Chilean Ministry of Health did not guarantee the participation of all countries."

The top four countries not already qualified, per weight category, earned a berth into the 2023 Pan American Games.

== Medal table ==
* Host nation (Mexico)

Rank	Nation	Gold	Silver	Bronze	Total
1	United States (USA)	17	3	4	24
2	Canada (CAN)	5	4	2	11
3	Cuba (CUB)	4	4	2	10
4	Mexico (MEX)*	1	6	7	14
5	Colombia (COL)	1	0	4	5
6	Venezuela (VEN)	1	0	3	4
7	Honduras (HON)	1	0	1	2
8	Brazil (BRA)	0	4	5	9
9	Puerto Rico (PUR)	0	4	2	6
10	Ecuador (ECU)	0	2	2	4
11	Guatemala (GUA)	0	2	1	3
12	Dominican Republic (DOM)	0	1	6	7
13	Argentina (ARG)	0	0	3	3
14	Peru (PER)	0	0	2	2
15	Chile (CHI)	0	0	1	1
15	Costa Rica (CRC)	0	0	1	1
Totals (16 entries)		30	30	46	106

== Team ranking ==
Rank	Men's freestyle		Men's Greco-Roman		Women's freestyle	
Rank	Team	Points	Team	Points	Team	Points
1	United States	229	United States	165	United States	190
2	Canada	138	Mexico	148	Canada	165
3	Puerto Rico	120	Cuba	101	Mexico	120
4	Mexico	101	Colombia	89	Ecuador	80
5	Cuba	76	Brazil	83	Brazil	79
6	Argentina	56	Dominican Republic	81	Cuba	71
7	Brazil	55	Guatemala	71	Venezuela	55
8	Colombia	54	Honduras	60	Colombia	42
9	Dominican Republic	38	Chile	43	Peru	36
10	Venezuela	37	Peru	38	Argentina	35

== Medal overview ==
=== Men's freestyle ===
Event	Gold	Silver	Bronze
57 kg	Thomas Gilman; United States	Darian Cruz; Puerto Rico	Alexei Álvarez; Cuba
57 kg	Thomas Gilman; United States	Darian Cruz; Puerto Rico	Óscar Tigreros; Colombia
61 kg	Daton Fix; United States	Joey Silva; Puerto Rico	Pedro Flores; Mexico
65 kg	Joseph McKenna; United States	Sebastian Rivera; Puerto Rico	Álbaro Rudesindo; Dominican Republic
65 kg	Joseph McKenna; United States	Sebastian Rivera; Puerto Rico	Agustín Destribats; Argentina
70 kg	Emmanuel Olapade; Canada	Vinicius Joaquim; Brazil	Alexis Olvera; Mexico
74 kg	Kyle Dake; United States	Franklin Gómez; Puerto Rico	Franklin Marén; Cuba
74 kg	Kyle Dake; United States	Franklin Gómez; Puerto Rico	César Alvan; Brazil
79 kg	Jordan Burroughs; United States	Sam Barmish; Canada	Víctor Santos; Puerto Rico
86 kg	Zahid Valencia; United States	Lázaro Hernández; Cuba	Ethan Ramos; Puerto Rico
86 kg	Zahid Valencia; United States	Lázaro Hernández; Cuba	Carlos Izquierdo; Colombia
92 kg	J'den Cox; United States	Jérémy Poirier; Canada	Cristián Sánchez; Mexico
97 kg	Kyle Snyder; United States	Arturo Silot; Cuba	Luis Miguel Pérez; Dominican Republic
97 kg	Kyle Snyder; United States	Arturo Silot; Cuba	Maxwell Lacey; Costa Rica
125 kg	Amar Dhesi; Canada	Nick Gwiazdowski; United States	José Daniel Díaz; Venezuela
125 kg	Amar Dhesi; Canada	Nick Gwiazdowski; United States	Catriel Muriel; Argentina

=== Greco-Roman ===
Event	Gold	Silver	Bronze
55 kg	Brady Koontz; United States	Axel Salas; Mexico	Brandon Escobar; Honduras
60 kg	Randon Miranda; United States	Samuel Gurria; Mexico	Joao Benavides; Peru
60 kg	Randon Miranda; United States	Samuel Gurria; Mexico	Dicther Toro; Colombia
63 kg	Sammy Jones; United States	José Rodríguez; Mexico	Not awarded as there were only two competitors.
67 kg	Julián Horta; Colombia	Kenedy Pedrosa; Brazil	Enyer Feliciano; Dominican Republic
67 kg	Julián Horta; Colombia	Kenedy Pedrosa; Brazil	Nilton Soto; Peru
72 kg	Pat Smith; United States	Edsson Olmos; Mexico	Cristian Mejía; Guatemala
77 kg	Yosvanys Peña; Cuba	David Choc; Guatemala	RaVaughn Perkins; United States
77 kg	Yosvanys Peña; Cuba	David Choc; Guatemala	Joílson Júnior; Brazil
82 kg	Daniel Vicente; Mexico	Reinier Jiménez; Guatemala	Tyler Cunningham; United States
87 kg	Daniel Grégorich; Cuba	Johan Batista; Dominican Republic	Alfonso Leyva; Mexico
87 kg	Daniel Grégorich; Cuba	Johan Batista; Dominican Republic	Carlos Muñoz; Colombia
97 kg	Kevin Mejía; Honduras	Juan Luis Conde; Cuba	Carlos Adames; Dominican Republic
97 kg	Kevin Mejía; Honduras	Juan Luis Conde; Cuba	Nicholas Boykin; United States
130 kg	Óscar Pino; Cuba	Eduard Soghomonyan; Brazil	Yasmani Acosta; Chile
130 kg	Óscar Pino; Cuba	Eduard Soghomonyan; Brazil	Leo Santana; Dominican Republic

=== Women's freestyle ===
Event	Gold	Silver	Bronze
50 kg	Sarah Hildebrandt; United States	Madison Parks; Canada	Patricia Bermúdez; Argentina
50 kg	Sarah Hildebrandt; United States	Madison Parks; Canada	Jacqueline Mollocana; Ecuador
53 kg	Dominique Parrish; United States	Luisa Valverde; Ecuador	Betzabeth Argüello; Venezuela
53 kg	Dominique Parrish; United States	Luisa Valverde; Ecuador	Karla Acosta; Mexico
55 kg	Karla Godinez; Canada	Jacarra Winchester; United States	Lucía Yépez; Ecuador
57 kg	Yaynelis Sanz; Cuba	Alma Valencia; Mexico	Giullia Penalber; Brazil
57 kg	Yaynelis Sanz; Cuba	Alma Valencia; Mexico	Alexandria Town; Canada
59 kg	Laurence Beauregard; Canada	Ameyalli Jessel; Mexico	Xochitl Mota-Pettis; United States
62 kg	Ana Godinez; Canada	Kayla Miracle; United States	Alejandra Romero; Mexico
62 kg	Ana Godinez; Canada	Kayla Miracle; United States	Laís Nunes; Brazil
65 kg	Forrest Molinari; United States	Miki Rowbottom; Canada	Atzimba Landaverde; Mexico
68 kg	Soleymi Caraballo; Venezuela	Hangelen Llanes; Cuba	Yessica Oviedo; Dominican Republic
68 kg	Soleymi Caraballo; Venezuela	Hangelen Llanes; Cuba	Gabriela Rocha; Brazil
72 kg	Skylar Grote; United States	Brenda Aguiar; Brazil	María Guadalupe García; Mexico
76 kg	Dymond Guilford; United States	Génesis Reasco; Ecuador	María Acosta; Venezuela
76 kg	Dymond Guilford; United States	Génesis Reasco; Ecuador	Justina Di Stasio; Canada

== Participating nations ==
263 wrestlers from 21 nations competed.

- Argentina (10)
- Barbados (1)
- Bolivia (2)
- Brazil (23)
- Canada (23)
- Chile (18)
- Colombia (20)
- Costa Rica (1)
- Cuba (17)
- Dominican Republic (17)
- Ecuador (14)
- Guatemala (10)
- Honduras (6)
- Mexico (30)
- Panama (5)
- Paraguay (3)
- Peru (13)
- Puerto Rico (12)
- Uruguay (1)
- United States (30)
- Venezuela (7)

== Results ==
Legend

- C — Won by 3 cautions given to the opponent
- F — Won by fall
- R — Retired
- WO — Won by walkover

=== Men's freestyle ===
==== Men's freestyle 57 kg ====
8 May

Round of 16
Brandon Escobar (HON)	10
Enrique Herrera (PER)	14
Alexei Álvarez (CUB)	4^{F}
Pedro Galaz (CHI)	0
Juan Rubelín Ramírez (DOM)	10
Roberto Alejandro (MEX)	0
Óscar Tigreros (COL)	2
Darian Cruz (PUR)	7
Bryan Oliveira (BRA)	0
Edwin Segura (GUA)	2^{F}
Pedro Mejías (VEN)	4
Darthe Capellan (CAN)	4

Quarterfinals
Thomas Gilman (USA)	11^{F}
Enrique Herrera (PER)	0
Alexei Álvarez (CUB)	12
Juan Rubelín Ramírez (DOM)	2
Darian Cruz (PUR)	10
Edwin Segura (GUA)	0
Darthe Capellan (CAN)	11
Guesseppe Rea (ECU)	0

Semifinals
Thomas Gilman (USA)	12^{F}
Alexei Álvarez (CUB)	2
Darian Cruz (PUR)	8
Darthe Capellan (CAN)	1

Final
Thomas Gilman (USA)	11
Darian Cruz (PUR)	0

Repechage round 1
Óscar Tigreros (COL)	10
Edwin Segura (GUA)	0

Bronze medal match
Enrique Herrera (PER)	0
Alexei Álvarez (CUB)	10
Óscar Tigreros (COL)	4
Darthe Capellan (CAN)	3

==== Men's freestyle 61 kg ====
8 May

Pos	Athlete	Pld	W	L	CP	TP	USA	PUR	MEX	CAN
1	Daton Fix (USA)	3	3	0	13	31	—	11–0	10–0	10–0 Fall
2	Joey Silva (PUR)	3	2	1	8	21	0–4 SU	—	11–1	10–0
3	Pedro Flores (MEX)	3	1	2	6	9	0–4 SU	1–4 SU1	—	8–0 Fall
4	Logan Sloan (CAN)	3	0	3	0	0	0–5 FA	0–4 SU	0–5 FA	—

Source: UWW

==== Men's freestyle 65 kg ====
8 May

Round of 16
Jonnathan Pérez (GUA)	0
Álbaro Rudesindo (DOM)	10
Jacob Torres (CAN)	WO
~~Mauricio Sánchez (ECU)~~
Cristian Santiago (MEX)	10
Andrés Pérez (URU)	0
Agustín Destribats (ARG)	5
Úber Cuero (COL)	4
~~Damián Solenzal (CUB)~~
Sixto Auccapiña (PER)	WO
André Quispe (CHI)	12
Dom Juan Ferreira (BRA)	2

Quarterfinals
Sebastian Rivera (PUR)	8^{F}
Álbaro Rudesindo (DOM)	6
Jacob Torres (CAN)	5
Cristian Santiago (MEX)	5
Agustín Destribats (ARG)	6
Sixto Auccapiña (PER)	1
André Quispe (CHI)	0
Joseph McKenna (USA)	10

Semifinals
Sebastian Rivera (PUR)	11
Jacob Torres (CAN)	0
Agustín Destribats (ARG)	5
Joseph McKenna (USA)	13

Final
Sebastian Rivera (PUR)	0
Joseph McKenna (USA)	10

Bronze medal match
Álbaro Rudesindo (DOM)	10
Jacob Torres (CAN)	0
André Quispe (CHI)	0
Agustín Destribats (ARG)	10

==== Men's freestyle 70 kg ====
8 May

Pos	Athlete	Pld	W	L	CP	TP	MEX	PER	ARG
1	Alexis Olvera (MEX)	2	2	0	7	22	—	12–10	10–0
2	Jhon Chunga (PER)	2	1	1	4	20	1–3 PO1	—	10–8
3	Cristian Karlikowski (ARG)	2	0	2	1	8	0–4 SU	1–3 PO1	—

Source: UWW

Pos	Athlete	Pld	W	L	CP	TP	CAN	BRA	USA
1	Emmanuel Olapade (CAN)	2	2	0	10	11	—	11–2 Fall	WO
2	Vinicius Joaquim (BRA)	2	1	1	5	2	0–5 FA	—	WO
3	Zain Retherford (USA)	2	0	2	0	0	0–5 IN	0–5 IN	—

Source: UWW

Semifinals
Alexis Olvera (MEX)	10
Vinicius Joaquim (BRA)	14
Emmanuel Olapade (CAN)	12
Jhon Chunga (PER)	1

Final
Vinicius Joaquim (BRA)	1
Emmanuel Olapade (CAN)	4
Bronze medal
Alexis Olvera (MEX)	10
Jhon Chunga (PER)	0

==== Men's freestyle 74 kg ====
8 May

Round of 16
Diego Sandoval (MEX)	5
Enrique Pérez (GUA)	1
Ángel Cortés (PAN)	10
Pablo Vera (PAR)	0
Sergio Godoy (ECU)	0
Franklin Marén (CUB)	10
Julio Rodríguez (DOM)	0^{R}
César Alvan (BRA)	8
Jasmit Phulka (CAN)	10
Andrés Ramírez (COL)	5
León Peralta (CHI)	10
Antony Iparraguirre (PER)	0

Quarterfinals
Kyle Dake (USA)	12
Diego Sandoval (MEX)	1
Ángel Cortés (PAN)	2
Franklin Marén (CUB)	12
César Alvan (BRA)	5
Jasmit Phulka (CAN)	0
León Peralta (CHI)	0
Franklin Gómez (PUR)	10

Semifinals
Kyle Dake (USA)	10
Franklin Marén (CUB)	0
César Alvan (BRA)	0
Franklin Gómez (PUR)	11

Final
Kyle Dake (USA)	10
Franklin Gómez (PUR)	1

Bronze medal match
Diego Sandoval (MEX)	1
Franklin Marén (CUB)	8
León Peralta (CHI)	0
César Alvan (BRA)	10

==== Men's freestyle 79 kg ====
7 May

Pos	Athlete	Pld	W	L	CP	TP	USA	CAN	PUR	MEX	COL
1	Jordan Burroughs (USA)	4	4	0	17	40	—	12–1	8–0 Fall	10–0	10–0
2	Sam Barmish (CAN)	4	3	1	13	26	1–4 SU1	—	6–0 Fall	9–0	10–0
3	Víctor Santos (PUR)	4	2	2	6	22	0–5 FA	0–5 FA	—	8–8	14–7
4	Miguel Ornelas (MEX)	4	1	3	4	13	0–4 SU	0–3 PO	1–3 PO1	—	5–3
5	Juan Sebastián Rivera (COL)	4	0	4	2	10	0–4 SU	0–4 SU	1–3 PO1	1–3 PO1	—

Source: UWW

==== Men's freestyle 86 kg ====
8 May

Round of 16
Eduardo Gajardo (CHI)	0
Pedro Ceballos (VEN)	10
Jorge Llano (ARG)	0
Lázaro Hernández (CUB)	11
Christian Anguiano (MEX)	9
Taran Goring (CAN)	1
Jorge Andy (ECU)	13
Giovanni Piazza (BRA)	9

Quarterfinals
Ethan Ramos (PUR)	7
Pedro Ceballos (VEN)	6
Lázaro Hernández (CUB)	10
Andrew Vera-Jackson (BOL)	0
Zahid Valencia (USA)	11
Christian Anguiano (MEX)	0
Jorge Andy (ECU)	0
Carlos Izquierdo (COL)	10

Semifinals
Ethan Ramos (PUR)	10
Lázaro Hernández (CUB)	10
Zahid Valencia (USA)	14
Carlos Izquierdo (COL)	4

Final
Lázaro Hernández (CUB)	1
Zahid Valencia (USA)	4

Repechage round 1
Jorge Llano (ARG)	13
Andrew Vera-Jackson (BOL)	2

Bronze medal match
Jorge Llano (ARG)	0
Ethan Ramos (PUR)	11
Christian Anguiano (MEX)	4
Carlos Izquierdo (COL)	5

==== Men's freestyle 92 kg ====
7 May

Pos	Athlete	Pld	W	L	CP	TP	USA	CAN	MEX	VEN
1	J'den Cox (USA)	3	3	0	12	32	—	11–0	10–0	10–0
2	Jérémy Poirier (CAN)	3	2	1	8	20	0–4 SU	—	10–0	10–0
3	Cristián Sánchez (MEX)	3	1	2	4	10	0–4 SU	0–4 SU	—	10–0
4	Gilberto Ayala (VEN)	3	0	3	0	0	0–4 SU	0–4 SU	0–4 SU	—

Source: UWW

==== Men's freestyle 97 kg ====
8 May

Round of 16
Ailton Rocha (BRA)	0
Luis Miguel Pérez (DOM)	10
Matías Uribe (CHI)	0
Huberth Soliz (BOL)	10
Arturo Silot (CUB)	12
Maxwell Lacey (CRC)	2

Quarterfinals
Kyle Snyder (USA)	10
Luis Miguel Pérez (DOM)	0
Nishan Randhawa (CAN)	10
Miller Mondragon (COL)	0
Esdras López (MEX)	13
Huberth Soliz (BOL)	3
Arturo Silot (CUB)	5
Ricardo Báez (ARG)	1

Semifinals
Kyle Snyder (USA)	11
Nishan Randhawa (CAN)	0
Esdras López (MEX)	0
Arturo Silot (CUB)	10

Final
Kyle Snyder (USA)	12
Arturo Silot (CUB)	1

Repechage round 1
Maxwell Lacey (CRC)	8
Ricardo Báez (ARG)	7

Bronze medal match
Luis Miguel Pérez (DOM)	10
Nishan Randhawa (CAN)	0
Maxwell Lacey (CRC)	2^{F}
Esdras López (MEX)	1

==== Men's freestyle 125 kg ====
8 May

Round of 16
Diego Almendras (CHI)	0
Charles Merrill (PUR)	10
Brandon Anguiano (MEX)	12
Jhoan Ocoro (COL)	1
Gabriel Silva (BRA)	6^{F}
Elison Adames (DOM)	0

Quarterfinals
Nick Gwiazdowski (USA)	10
Charles Merrill (PUR)	0
Ibrain Torres (CUB)	4
José Daniel Díaz (VEN)	6
Catriel Muriel (ARG)	11
Brandon Anguiano (MEX)	0
Gabriel Silva (BRA)	2
Amar Dhesi (CAN)	13

Semifinals
Nick Gwiazdowski (USA)	11
José Daniel Díaz (VEN)	1
Catriel Muriel (ARG)	0
Amar Dhesi (CAN)	10

Final
Nick Gwiazdowski (USA)	3
Amar Dhesi (CAN)	5

Bronze medal match
Charles Merrill (PUR)	1
José Daniel Díaz (VEN)	2
Gabriel Silva (BRA)	6
Catriel Muriel (ARG)	14^{F}

=== Men's Greco-Roman ===
==== Men's Greco-Roman 55 kg ====
5 May

Pos	Athlete	Pld	W	L	CP	TP	USA	MEX	HON	BRA
1	Brady Koontz (USA)	3	3	0	13	20	—	9–1	11–0	WO
2	Axel Salas (MEX)	3	2	1	9	7	1–4 SU1	—	6–2	WO
3	Brandon Escobar (HON)	3	1	2	6	2	0–4 SU	1–3 PO1	—	WO
—	Gemerson Moura (BRA)	3	0	3	0	0	0–5 FO	0–5 FO	0–5 FO	—

Source: UWW

==== Men's Greco-Roman 60 kg ====
5 May

Round of 16
Emerson Felipe (GUA)	0
Randon Miranda (USA)	11
Dicther Toro (COL)	8
Antonio Ruiz (ECU)	0

Quarterfinals
Marat Garipov (BRA)	1
Randon Miranda (USA)	7
Joao Benavides (PER)	5
Leonardo Herrera (CUB)	4
Pedro Gutiérrez (CHI)	3
Maikol Josefa (DOM)	7
Dicther Toro (COL)	6
Samuel Gurria (MEX)	14

Semifinals
Randon Miranda (USA)	8
Joao Benavides (PER)	7
Maikol Josefa (DOM)	0
Samuel Gurria (MEX)	10

Final
Randon Miranda (USA)	12
Samuel Gurria (MEX)	8

Repechage round 1
Emerson Felipe (GUA)	4
Marat Garipov (BRA)	1

Bronze medal match
Emerson Felipe (GUA)	4
Joao Benavides (PER)	5
Dicther Toro (COL)	8
Maikol Josefa (DOM)	0

==== Men's Greco-Roman 63 kg ====
5 May

Pos	Athlete	Pld	W	L	CP	TP	USA	MEX
1	Sammy Jones (USA)	1	1	0	4	9	—	10–0
2	José Rodríguez (MEX)	1	0	1	0	0	0–4 SU	—

Source: UWW

==== Men's Greco-Roman 67 kg ====
5 May

Round of 16
Cristhian Rivas (ECU)	2
Alejandro Varela (GUA)	4
Hayden Tuma (USA)	11
Mauricio Lovera (ARG)	0
Lisandro Cabrera (PAR)	0
Nilton Soto (PER)	8

Quarterfinals
Enyer Feliciano (DOM)	7^{F}
Alejandro Varela (GUA)	2
Kenedy Pedrosa (BRA)	2
Cristóbal Torres (CHI)	1
Diego Martínez (MEX)	8
Hayden Tuma (USA)	4
Nilton Soto (PER)	0
Julián Horta (COL)	10

Semifinals
Enyer Feliciano (DOM)	1
Kenedy Pedrosa (BRA)	4
Diego Martínez (MEX)	1
Julián Horta (COL)	8

Final
Kenedy Pedrosa (BRA)	0
Julián Horta (COL)	5

Bronze medal match
Cristóbal Torres (CHI)	3
Enyer Feliciano (DOM)	4
Nilton Soto (PER)	2
Diego Martínez (MEX)	0

==== Men's Greco-Roman 72 kg ====
5 May

Pos	Athlete	Pld	W	L	CP	TP	USA	MEX	GUA	PAN	ARG
1	Pat Smith (USA)	4	4	0	15	29	—	4–2	9–0	8–0	8–0
2	Edson Olmos (MEX)	4	3	1	13	29	1–3 PO1	—	9–0	8–0	10–0
3	Cristian Mejía (GUA)	4	2	2	7	17	0–4 SU	0–4 SU	—	4–2	13–4
4	Ángel Cortés (PAN)	4	1	3	5	12	0–4 SU	0–4 SU	1–3 PO1	—	10–2
5	Horacio Miranda (ARG)	4	0	4	2	6	0–4 SU	0–4 SU	1–4 SU1	1–4 SU1	—

Source: UWW

==== Men's Greco-Roman 77 kg ====
6 May

Round of 16
Emmanuel Benítez (MEX)	6
Alvis Almendra (PAN)	1
Jerome Hoyte (BAR)	0
RaVaughn Perkins (USA)	8^{F}
Jair Cuero (COL)	9
Diego Moreno (CHI)	0
John Yeats (CAN)	0
David Choc (GUA)	9
Luis de León (DOM)	9
Ryan Cubas (PER)	0

Quarterfinals
Yosvanys Peña (CUB)	3
Emmanuel Benítez (MEX)	0
RaVaughn Perkins (USA)	8
Jair Cuero (COL)	3
Daniel Pinargote (ECU)	0
David Choc (GUA)	8
Luis de León (DOM)	1
Joílson Júnior (BRA)	5

Semifinals
Yosvanys Peña (CUB)	4
RaVaughn Perkins (USA)	1
David Choc (GUA)	10
Joílson Júnior (BRA)	1

Final
Yosvanys Peña (CUB)	7
David Choc (GUA)	2

Repechage round 1
John Yeats (CAN)	8
Daniel Pinargote (ECU)	0

Bronze medal match
Emmanuel Benítez (MEX)	2
RaVaughn Perkins (USA)	3
John Yeats (CAN)	0
Joílson Júnior (BRA)	8

==== Men's Greco-Roman 82 kg ====
6 May

Pos	Athlete	Pld	W	L	CP	TP	GUA	MEX	BRA
1	Reinier Jiménez (GUA)	2	2	0	9	10	—	10–1	WO
2	Daniel Vicente (MEX)	2	1	1	6	1	1–4 SU1	—	WO
—	Michael Hendson Lima (BRA)	2	0	2	0	0	0–5 FO	0–5 FO	—

Source: UWW

Pos	Athlete	Pld	W	L	CP	TP	USA	COL	CAN
1	Tyler Cunningham (USA)	2	2	0	10	15	—	7–0 3C	8–1 Fall
2	Néstor Tafur (COL)	2	1	1	4	9	0–5 CA	—	9–0
3	Brayden Ambo (CAN)	2	0	2	0	1	0–5 FA	0–4 SU	—

Source: UWW

Semifinals
Reinier Jiménez (GUA)	11
Néstor Tafur (COL)	0
Tyler Cunningham (USA)	6
Daniel Vicente (MEX)	7

Final
Reinier Jiménez (GUA)	1
Daniel Vicente (MEX)	1
Bronze medal
Néstor Tafur (COL)	0
Tyler Cunningham (USA)	6^{C}

==== Men's Greco-Roman 87 kg ====
6 May

Round of 16
André Pinto (BRA)	8
Guillermo González (CHI)	0

Quarterfinals
Daniel Grégorich (CUB)	9
André Pinto (BRA)	0
Pool Ambrocio (PER)	1
Alfonso Leyva (MEX)	3
Richard Carlson (USA)	1
Carlos Muñoz (COL)	3
Johan Batista (DOM)	8
Ariel Alfonso (HON)	0

Semifinals
Daniel Grégorich (CUB)	3
Alfonso Leyva (MEX)	1
Carlos Muñoz (COL)	2
Johan Batista (DOM)	4

Final
Daniel Grégorich (CUB)	9
Johan Batista (DOM)	0

Bronze medal match
André Pinto (BRA)	5
Alfonso Leyva (MEX)	7
Ariel Alfonso (HON)	3
Carlos Muñoz (COL)	11

==== Men's Greco-Roman 97 kg ====
5 May

Round of 16
Carlos Valor (COL)	0
Carlos Adames (DOM)	8

Quarterfinals
Jean Nazareno (ECU)	0
Carlos Adames (DOM)	8
Igor Queiroz (BRA)	1
Juan Luis Conde (CUB)	3
Nicholas Boykin (USA)	9
Luis Rivera (MEX)	0
Kevin Mejía (HON)	8
Eduardo Gajardo (CHI)	0

Semifinals
Carlos Adames (DOM)	2
Juan Luis Conde (CUB)	3
Nicholas Boykin (USA)	0
Kevin Mejía (HON)	8

Final
Juan Luis Conde (CUB)	0
Kevin Mejía (HON)	8

Bronze medal match
Igor Queiroz (BRA)	3
Carlos Adames (DOM)	7
Eduardo Gajardo (CHI)
Nicholas Boykin (USA)	WO

==== Men's Greco-Roman 130 kg ====
5 May

Round of 16
Tanner Farmer (USA)	0
Óscar Pino (CUB)	9
Gino Ávila (HON)	8
Christian Chajón (GUA)	0
Leo Santana (DOM)	5^{F}
Paúl Morales (MEX)	0

Quarterfinals
Yasmani Acosta (CHI)	1
Óscar Pino (CUB)	3
Jacob Phillips (CAN)	0
Edgardo López (PUR)	8
Cristian Bravo (COL)	2
Gino Ávila (HON)	2
Leo Santana (DOM)	1
Eduard Soghomonyan (BRA)	2

Semifinals
Óscar Pino (CUB)	8
Edgardo López (PUR)	0
Gino Ávila (HON)	0
Eduard Soghomonyan (BRA)	9

Final
Óscar Pino (CUB)	9
Eduard Soghomonyan (BRA)	1

Repechage round 1
Tanner Farmer (USA)	1
Yasmani Acosta (CHI)	3

Bronze medal match
Yasmani Acosta (CHI)	9
Edgardo López (PUR)	0
Leo Santana (DOM)	WO
Gino Ávila (HON)

=== Women's freestyle ===
==== Women's freestyle 50 kg ====
7 May

Round of 16
Shammilka Miranda (PUR)	6^{F}
Margarita González (CHI)	0
Patricia Bermúdez (ARG)	12
Fabiana Díaz (DOM)	0
Rita Rojas (MEX)	8
Thalía Mallqui (PER)	6
Yoannia Pérez (CUB)	12
Yorlenis Morán (PAN)	2
Jacqueline Mollocana (ECU)	10
Alisson Cardozo (COL)	0

Quarterfinals
Sarah Hildebrandt (USA)	10
Shammilka Miranda (PUR)	0
Patricia Bermúdez (ARG)	8
Rita Rojas (MEX)	7
Kamila Barbosa (BRA)	4
Yoannia Pérez (CUB)	6
Jacqueline Mollocana (ECU)	6
Madison Parks (CAN)	7

Semifinals
Sarah Hildebrandt (USA)	10
Patricia Bermúdez (ARG)	0
Yoannia Pérez (CUB)	3
Madison Parks (CAN)	4

Final
Sarah Hildebrandt (USA)	10
Madison Parks (CAN)	0

Bronze medal match
Shammilka Miranda (PUR)	0
Patricia Bermúdez (ARG)	10
Jacqueline Mollocana (ECU)	12
Yoannia Pérez (CUB)	2

==== Women's freestyle 53 kg ====
7 May

Round of 16
Gabriela Ramos (PUR)	0
Betzabeth Argüello (VEN)	11
Nathaly Herrera (PER)	0
Sabrina Tapajós (BRA)	11
Anny Ramírez (DOM)	12
Javiera Ortega (CHI)	1
Karla Acosta (MEX)	4^{F}
Lourdes Grenno (PAR)	0
Sandy Parra (COL)	WO
~~Amanda Hernández (CUB)~~

Quarterfinals
Luisa Valverde (ECU)	4
Betzabeth Argüello (VEN)	0
Sabrina Tapajós (BRA)	2
Anny Ramírez (DOM)	5
Dominique Parrish (USA)	4
Karla Acosta (MEX)	3
Sandy Parra (COL)	2
Samantha Stewart (CAN)	5

Semifinals
Luisa Valverde (ECU)	4^{F}
Anny Ramírez (DOM)	0
Dominique Parrish (USA)	5
Samantha Stewart (CAN)	4

Final
Luisa Valverde (ECU)	1
Dominique Parrish (USA)	4^{F}

Bronze medal match
Betzabeth Argüello (VEN)	4^{F}
Anny Ramírez (DOM)	0
Karla Acosta (MEX)	10
Samantha Stewart (CAN)	0

==== Women's freestyle 55 kg ====
6 May

Pos	Athlete	Pld	W	L	CP	TP	USA	PER	BRA
1	Jacarra Winchester (USA)	2	2	0	10	10	—	10–0 Fall	WO
2	Nadia Trujillano (PER)	2	1	1	5	0	0–5 FA	—	WO
—	Lislly Lima (BRA)	2	0	2	0	0	0–5 FO	0–5 FO	—

Source: UWW

Pos	Athlete	Pld	W	L	CP	TP	CAN	ECU	MEX
1	Karla Godinez (CAN)	2	2	0	6	11	—	4–2	7–1
2	Lucía Yépez (ECU)	2	1	1	4	8	1–3 PO1	—	6–1
3	Brenda Fernández (MEX)	2	0	2	2	2	1–3 PO1	1–3 PO1	—

Source: UWW

Semifinals
Jacarra Winchester (USA)	11
Lucía Yépez (ECU)	0
Karla Godinez (CAN)	11
Nadia Trujillano (PER)	0

Final
Jacarra Winchester (USA)	5
Karla Godinez (CAN)	8
Bronze medal
Lucía Yépez (ECU)	10
Nadia Trujillano (PER)	0

==== Women's freestyle 57 kg ====
7 May

Round of 16
María González (DOM)	0
Yaynelis Sanz (CUB)	10
Nes Marie Rodríguez (PUR)	2
Tatiana Hurtado (COL)	12
Camila Amarilla (ARG)	10
Heidy Alcívar (ECU)	0

Quarterfinals
Giullia Penalber (BRA)	10
Yaynelis Sanz (CUB)	12
Cameron Guerin (USA)	13
Antonia Valdés (CHI)	4
Alexandria Town (CAN)	10
Tatiana Hurtado (COL)	0
Camila Amarilla (ARG)	7
Alma Valencia (MEX)	18

Semifinals
Yaynelis Sanz (CUB)	12
Cameron Guerin (USA)	7
Alexandria Town (CAN)	8
Alma Valencia (MEX)	8^{F}

Final
Yaynelis Sanz (CUB)	5
Alma Valencia (MEX)	1

Repechage round 1
María González (DOM)	0
Giullia Penalber (BRA)	10

Bronze medal match
Giullia Penalber (BRA)	7
Cameron Guerin (USA)	7
Camila Amarilla (ARG)	0
Alexandria Town (CAN)	10

==== Women's freestyle 59 kg ====
6 May

Pos	Athlete	Pld	W	L	CP	TP	CAN	MEX	USA
1	Laurence Beauregard (CAN)	2	2	0	9	12	—	10–0	2–2 Fall
2	Ameyalli Jessel (MEX)	2	1	1	4	19	0–4 SU	—	19–8
3	Xochitl Mota-Pettis (USA)	2	0	2	1	10	0–5 FA	1–4 SU1	—

Source: UWW

==== Women's freestyle 62 kg ====
7 May

Round of 16
Gloria Segura (DOM)	1
Yolanda Cordero (CUB)	11
Leonela Ayoví (ECU)	12
Ashley Zárate (PAN)	7

Quarterfinals
Kayla Miracle (USA)	11
Yolanda Cordero (CUB)	0
Javiera Roco (CHI)	0
Alejandra Romero (MEX)	8^{F}
Ana Godinez (CAN)	11
Andrea González (COL)	0
Leonela Ayoví (ECU)	4
Laís Nunes (BRA)	12

Semifinals
Kayla Miracle (USA)	6
Alejandra Romero (MEX)	4
Ana Godinez (CAN)	7
Laís Nunes (BRA)	5

Final
Kayla Miracle (USA)
Ana Godinez (CAN)	WO

Bronze medal match
Yolanda Cordero (CUB)	2
Alejandra Romero (MEX)	5
Andrea González (COL)	0
Laís Nunes (BRA)	7

==== Women's freestyle 65 kg ====
6 May

Pos	Athlete	Pld	W	L	CP	TP	USA	CAN	MEX	HON
1	Forrest Molinari (USA)	3	3	0	13	28	—	8–0 Fall	10–0	10–0
2	Miki Rowbottom (CAN)	3	2	1	7	16	0–5 FA	—	11–0	5–1
3	Atzimba Landaverde (MEX)	3	1	2	3	3	0–4 SU	0–4 SU	—	3–1
4	Saidy Chávez (HON)	3	0	3	2	2	0–4 SU	1–3 PO1	1–3 PO1	—

Source: UWW

==== Women's freestyle 68 kg ====
7 May

Round of 16
Yessica Oviedo (DOM)	7
Alara Boyd (USA)	2
Yanet Sovero (PER)	3
Hangelen Llanes (CUB)	5
Gabriela Rocha (BRA)	1
Soleymi Caraballo (VEN)	9
Isidora Díaz (CHI)	6
Ginamarie Santiago (PUR)	8

Quarterfinals
Ámbar Garnica (MEX)	2
Yessica Oviedo (DOM)	5
Hangelen Llanes (CUB)	9
Paula Montoya (COL)	1
Silvia Hernández (GUA)	0
Soleymi Caraballo (VEN)	10
Ginamarie Santiago (PUR)	0
Kayla Bednarcik (CAN)	4^{F}

Semifinals
Yessica Oviedo (DOM)	4
Hangelen Llanes (CUB)	6
Soleymi Caraballo (VEN)	11
Kayla Bednarcik (CAN)	0

Final
Hangelen Llanes (CUB)	2
Soleymi Caraballo (VEN)	12

Repechage round 1
Yanet Sovero (PER)	5
Paula Montoya (COL)	2
Gabriela Rocha (BRA)	2^{F}
Silvia Hernández (GUA)	0

Bronze medal match
Yanet Sovero (PER)	2
Yessica Oviedo (DOM)	10
Gabriela Rocha (BRA)	6
Kayla Bednarcik (CAN)	1

==== Women's freestyle 72 kg ====
6 May

Pos	Athlete	Pld	W	L	CP	TP	USA	BRA	MEX	CAN
1	Skylar Grote (USA)	3	3	0	13	20	—	10–0	10–0	WO
2	Brenda Aguiar (BRA)	3	2	1	8	4	0–4 SU	—	4–1	WO
3	María Guadalupe García (MEX)	3	1	2	6	1	0–4 SU	1–3 PO1	—	WO
—	Taylor Follensbee (CAN)	3	0	3	0	0	0–5 FO	0–5 FO	0–5 FO	—

Source: UWW

==== Women's freestyle 76 kg ====
7 May

Round of 16
Natalie Ovando (CHI)	0
Diana Cruz (PER)	10
Ruthy Hellen dos Santos (BRA)	2
Dymond Guilford (USA)	10^{F}
Justina Di Stasio (CAN)	12
Luz María Hernández (MEX)	0
Tatiana Rentería (COL)	4
Milaimys Marín (CUB)	3

Quarterfinals
Linda Machuca (ARG)	9
Diana Cruz (PER)	0
Dymond Guilford (USA)	10
María Acosta (VEN)	0
Génesis Reasco (ECU)	10
Justina Di Stasio (CAN)	4
Tatiana Rentería (COL)	8^{F}
Emelyn Bautista (DOM)	0

Semifinals
Linda Machuca (ARG)	2
Dymond Guilford (USA)	12
Génesis Reasco (ECU)	4
Tatiana Rentería (COL)	4

Final
Dymond Guilford (USA)	1
Génesis Reasco (ECU)	1

Repechage round 1
Ruthy Hellen dos Santos (BRA)	0
María Acosta (VEN)	6

Bronze medal match
María Acosta (VEN)	13
Linda Machuca (ARG)	11
Justina Di Stasio (CAN)	3
Tatiana Rentería (COL)	2
