= Enrique Herrera (wrestler) =

Peruvian freestyle wrestler

Personal information
- Full name: Enrique Armando Herrera Huacre

Sport
- Country: Peru
- Sport: Amateur wrestling
- Weight class: 57 kg
- Event: Freestyle
Medal record
Men's freestyle wrestling
Representing Peru
South American Games
Bronze medal – third place	2022 Asunción	57 kg
Bolivarian Games
Silver medal – second place	2022 Valledupar	57 kg
Junior Pan American Games
Silver medal – second place	2021 Cali-Valle	57 kg

Enrique Armando Herrera Huacre is a Peruvian freestyle wrestler. He won the silver medal in the men's 57 kg event at the 2022 Bolivarian Games held in Valledupar, Colombia. He won the bronze medal in his event at the 2022 South American Games held in Asunción, Paraguay.

He lost his bronze medal match in his event at the 2022 Pan American Wrestling Championships held in Acapulco, Mexico. In 2024, he competed at the Pan American Wrestling Olympic Qualification Tournament held in Acapulco, Mexico hoping to qualify for the 2024 Summer Olympics in Paris, France. He was eliminated in his first match by Roman Bravo-Young of Mexico.

== Achievements ==
Year	Tournament	Location	Result	Event
2021	Junior Pan American Games	Cali, Colombia	2nd	Freestyle 57 kg
2022	Bolivarian Games	Valledupar, Colombia	2nd	Freestyle 57 kg
2022	South American Games	Asunción, Paraguay	3rd	Freestyle 57 kg
