= Cesar Alvan =

Brazilian wrestler (born 2002)

Personal information
- Native name: Cesar Alvan
- Full name: Cesar Bordeaux Rego Alvan
- Nationality: Brazilian/American
- Born: April 9, 2002 (age 24) Massachusetts, U.S.A
- Home town: Ludlow, Massachusetts, U.S.A
- Education: Columbia University
- Height: 5 ft 10 in (178 cm)
- Weight: 74 kg (163 lb)

Sport
- Sport: Wrestling
- Weight class: 79 kg
- Events: Freestyle and Folkstyle
- Club: New York City Regional Training Center
Medal record
Men's freestyle wrestling
Representing the Brazil
Pan American Championships
| Bronze medal – third place | 2022 Acapulco | 74 kg |
| Bronze medal – third place | 2023 Buenos Aires | 74 kg |
South American Games
| Bronze medal – third place | 2022 Asunción | 74 kg |
Men's collegiate wrestling
Representing Columbia University
NCAA Division I Championships
| Bronze medal – third place | 2026 Cleveland | 165 lb |
Ivy League Championships
| Gold medal – first place | 2026 New York | 165 lb |

Cesar Alvan (born 2002) is a freestyle wrestler and graduated folkstyle wrestler who competes internationally for Brazil at 74 kg and 79 kg.

== Background ==
Alvan has an extensive background in Brazilian jiu-jitsu and holds a purple belt in that discipline. He was also a standout soccer player in high school.

== Folkstyle career ==
=== High school ===
During his high school wrestling years, Alvan competed at Northfield Mount Hermon School in the New England prep and national prep championships.

=== College ===
In collegiate wrestling, Alvan competed for the Columbia University Lions and is currently a one-time NCAA Division I All–American.

Alvan also won the 2026 Ivy League title at 165 lbs. for Columbia University

In July 2026, Alvan choose to remain at Columbia University as an assistant wrestling coach.

== Freestyle career ==
Alvan has one numerous international medal competing for Brazil. He earned a silver medal at the 2022 South American Games at 74 kg. He won bronze at the 2022 Senior Pan Am Championships and 2023 Senior Pan Am Championships and silver medal at the 2024 U23 Pan Am Championships all at 74 kg.

In September 2026, Alvan signed to compete with Real American Freestyle, at RAF 13 on May 30, 2026, in Miami, Florida.

== Personal life ==
Alvan is a dual citizen of the United States and Brazil.

== Freestyle record ==
Senior Freestyle Matches
| Res. | Record | Opponent | Score | Date | Event | Location |
|---|---|---|---|---|---|---|
| Win | | (United States) Jeremiah Moody | Fall | September 18, 2026 | RAF 13 | (United States) Miami, Florida |
2022 Pan American Championships (bronze) at 74 kg
| Win | | (Chile) León Peralta | TF 10–0 | May 8, 2022 | 2022 Pan American Continental Championships | Acapulco, Mexico |
| Loss | | (Puerto Rico) Franklin Gomez | 0–11 | May 8, 2022 | 2022 Pan American Continental Championships | Acapulco, Mexico |
| Win | | (Canada) Jasmit Phulka | 5–0 | May 8, 2022 | 2022 Pan American Continental Championships | Acapulco, Mexico |
| Win | | (Dominican Republic) Julio Dominquez | 8–0 | May 8, 2022 | 2022 Pan American Continental Championships | Acapulco, Mexico |
