= Pedro Ceballos =

Venezuelan freestyle wrestler

Personal information
- Born: 8 September 1990 (age 36) San Fernando de Apure, Venezuela

Sport
- Sport: Freestyle wrestling
Medal record
Men's freestyle wrestling
Representing Venezuela
Pan American Games
Silver medal – second place	2019 Lima	86 kg
Bronze medal – third place	2023 Santiago	86 kg

Pedro Francisco Ceballos Fuentes (born September 8, 1990) is a Venezuelan freestyle wrestler. He competed in the men's freestyle 86 kg event at the 2016 Summer Olympics, in which he lost the bronze medal match to Sharif Sharifov.

Ceballos won the gold medal in his event at the 2022 Bolivarian Games held in Valledupar, Colombia. He also won the gold medal in his event at the 2022 South American Games held in Asunción, Paraguay.

In 2024, Ceballos won the silver medal in men's 86 kg event at the 2024 Pan American Wrestling Championships held in Acapulco, Mexico. He competed at the Pan American Wrestling Olympic Qualification Tournament held in Acapulco, Mexico hoping to qualify for the 2024 Summer Olympics in Paris, France. He was eliminated in his first match.
