= 2023 Pan American Wrestling Championships =

2023 Pan American Championship
- Host city: Buenos Aires, Argentina
- Dates: 3-7 May 2023
- Stadium: Polideportivo (CENARD)

Champions
- Freestyle: United States
- Greco-Roman: United States
- Women: United States

The 2023 Pan American Wrestling Championships was the 36th edition of Pan American Wrestling Championships of combined events, and it was held from 3 to 7 May in Buenos Aires, Argentina.

== Competition schedule ==
All times are (UTC-3)

Date	Time	Event
3 May	11.00-13.00	Qualification rounds & repechages GR 55-60-67-72-97-130 kg
3 May	18.00-21.00	Finals: GR 55-60-67-72-97-130 kg
4 May	11.00-13.00	Qualification rounds & repechages GR 77-82-87 kg; WW 55-59-65-72 kg
4 May	18.00-21.00	Finals: GR 77-82-87 kg; WW 55-59-65-72 kg
5 May	11.00-13.00	Qualification rounds & repechages WW 50-53-57-62-68-76 kg; FS 79-92 kg
5 May	18.00-21.00	Finals: WW 50-53-57-62-68-76 kg; FS 79-92 kg
6 May	11.00-13.00	Qualification rounds & repechages FS 57-61-65-70-74-86-97-125 kg
6 May	18.00-21.00	Finals: FS 57-61-65-70-74-86-97-125 kg

== Medal table ==
* Host nation (Argentina)

Rank	Nation	Gold	Silver	Bronze	Total
1	United States	20	1	3	24
2	Cuba	5	3	7	15
3	Canada	2	5	6	13
4	Ecuador	2	2	3	7
5	Colombia	0	4	5	9
6	Venezuela	0	4	4	8
7	Puerto Rico	0	3	2	5
8	Brazil	0	2	4	6
9	Mexico	0	2	1	3
10	Honduras	0	2	0	2
11	Chile	0	1	1	2
12	Argentina*	0	0	6	6
13	Dominican Republic	0	0	2	2
14	Barbados	0	0	1	1
14	Guatemala	0	0	1	1
14	Jamaica	0	0	1	1
14	Peru	0	0	1	1
Totals (17 entries)		29	29	48	106

== Team ranking ==
Rank	Men's freestyle		Men's Greco-Roman		Women's freestyle	
Rank	Team	Points	Team	Points	Team	Points
1	United States	240	United States	175	United States	178
2	Canada	136	Cuba	114	Canada	135
3	Puerto Rico	123	Mexico	78	Ecuador	93
4	Cuba	105	Colombia	77	Cuba	91
5	Argentina	81	Venezuela	72	Colombia	82
6	Venezuela	67	Brazil	68	Venezuela	81
7	Brazil	57	Honduras	50	Brazil	57
8	Colombia	52	Dominican Republic	47	Mexico	49
9	Dominican Republic	41	Argentina	40	Argentina	48
10	Chile	26	Chile	39	Puerto Rico	26

== Medal overview ==
=== Men's freestyle ===
Event	Gold	Silver	Bronze
57 kg	Thomas Gilman; United States	Darian Cruz; Puerto Rico	Santiago Hernández; Cuba
57 kg	Thomas Gilman; United States	Darian Cruz; Puerto Rico	Pedro Mejías; Venezuela
61 kg	Vito Arujau; United States	Joey Silva; Puerto Rico	Jason-Guy Luneau; Canada
65 kg	Yianni Diakomihalis; United States	Alejandro Valdés; Cuba	Sebastian Rivera; Puerto Rico
65 kg	Yianni Diakomihalis; United States	Alejandro Valdés; Cuba	Agustín Destribats; Argentina
70 kg	Zain Retherford; United States	Connor Quinton; Canada	Mauricio Lovera; Argentina
74 kg	Kyle Dake; United States	Franklin Gómez; Puerto Rico	Franklin Marén; Cuba
74 kg	Kyle Dake; United States	Franklin Gómez; Puerto Rico	César Alvan; Brazil
79 kg	Jordan Burroughs; United States	Jasmit Phulka; Canada	Néstor Tafur; Colombia
79 kg	Jordan Burroughs; United States	Jasmit Phulka; Canada	Shane Jones; Puerto Rico
86 kg	Yurieski Torreblanca; Cuba	Alex Moore; Canada	Mark Hall; United States
86 kg	Yurieski Torreblanca; Cuba	Alex Moore; Canada	Carlos Izquierdo; Colombia
92 kg	Michael Macchiavello; United States	Jérémy Poirier; Canada	Alejandro Villagómez; Ecuador
97 kg	Kyle Snyder; United States	Arturo Silot; Cuba	Luis Miguel Pérez; Dominican Republic
97 kg	Kyle Snyder; United States	Arturo Silot; Cuba	Nishan Randhawa; Canada
125 kg	Dominique Bradley; United States	José Daniel Díaz; Venezuela	Catriel Muriel; Argentina
125 kg	Dominique Bradley; United States	José Daniel Díaz; Venezuela	Aaron Johnson; Jamaica

=== Men's Greco-Roman ===
Event	Gold	Silver	Bronze
55 kg	Dalton Duffield; United States	José Hernández; Mexico	Axel Rolón; Argentina
60 kg	Dalton Roberts; United States	Jeremy Peralta; Ecuador	Raiber Rodríguez; Venezuela
60 kg	Dalton Roberts; United States	Jeremy Peralta; Ecuador	Kevin de Armas; Cuba
63 kg	no competitors		
67 kg	Luis Orta; Cuba	Néstor Almanza; Chile	Andrés Montaño; Ecuador
67 kg	Luis Orta; Cuba	Néstor Almanza; Chile	Julián Horta; Colombia
72 kg	Justus Scott; United States	Kenedy Pedrosa; Brazil	Alejandro Varela; Guatemala
77 kg	Kamal Bey; United States	Yosvanys Peña; Cuba	Jair Cuero; Colombia
77 kg	Kamal Bey; United States	Yosvanys Peña; Cuba	Wuileixis Rivas; Venezuela
82 kg	Spencer Woods; United States	José Mosquera; Colombia	John Yeats; Canada
87 kg	Daniel Grégorich; Cuba	Luis Avendaño; Venezuela	Carlos Muñoz; Colombia
87 kg	Daniel Grégorich; Cuba	Luis Avendaño; Venezuela	Alan Vera; United States
97 kg	Joe Rau; United States	Kevin Mejía; Honduras	Carlos Adames; Dominican Republic
97 kg	Joe Rau; United States	Kevin Mejía; Honduras	Igor Queiroz; Brazil
130 kg	Óscar Pino; Cuba	Gino Ávila; Honduras	Eduard Soghomonyan; Brazil
130 kg	Óscar Pino; Cuba	Gino Ávila; Honduras	Yasmani Acosta; Chile

=== Women's freestyle ===
Event	Gold	Silver	Bronze
50 kg	Sarah Hildebrandt; United States	Jacqueline Mollocana; Ecuador	Yusneylys Guzmán; Cuba
50 kg	Sarah Hildebrandt; United States	Jacqueline Mollocana; Ecuador	Patricia Bermúdez; Argentina
53 kg	Lucía Yépez; Ecuador	Betzabeth Argüello; Venezuela	Karla Acosta; Mexico
53 kg	Lucía Yépez; Ecuador	Betzabeth Argüello; Venezuela	Laura Herin; Cuba
55 kg	Diana Weicker; Canada	Alisha Howk; United States	Adrianny Castillo; Argentina
57 kg	Luisa Valverde; Ecuador	Giullia Penalber; Brazil	Ángela Martínez; Cuba
57 kg	Luisa Valverde; Ecuador	Giullia Penalber; Brazil	Betzabeth Sarco; Venezuela
59 kg	Xochitl Mota-Pettis; United States	Alexandria Town; Canada	Jessica Derrell; Barbados
62 kg	Ana Godinez; Canada	Nathaly Grimán; Venezuela	Kayla Miracle; United States
62 kg	Ana Godinez; Canada	Nathaly Grimán; Venezuela	Laís Nunes; Brazil
65 kg	Mallory Velte; United States	Paula Montoya; Colombia	Aleah Nickel; Canada
68 kg	Forrest Molinari; United States	Ámbar Garnica; Mexico	Yanet Sovero; Peru
68 kg	Forrest Molinari; United States	Ámbar Garnica; Mexico	Hangelen Llanes; Cuba
72 kg	Amit Elor; United States	Luisa Mosquera; Colombia	Katie Mulkay; Canada
76 kg	Milaimys Marín; Cuba	Tatiana Rentería; Colombia	Génesis Reasco; Ecuador
76 kg	Milaimys Marín; Cuba	Tatiana Rentería; Colombia	Justina Di Stasio; Canada

== Participating nations ==
298 wrestlers from 24 countries:

1. Argentina (21) (Host)
2. Bahamas (1)
3. Barbados (3)
4. Bolivia (5)
5. Brazil (23)
6. Canada (22)
7. Chile (17)
8. Colombia (20)
9. Costa Rica (2)
10. Cuba (18)
11. Dominican Republic (18)
12. Ecuador (14)
13. El Salvador (1)
14. Guatemala (8)
15. Honduras (6)
16. Jamaica (2)
17. Mexico (21)
18. Panama (12)
19. Paraguay (2)
20. Peru (12)
21. Puerto Rico (21)
22. Uruguay (2)
23. United States (29)
24. Venezuela (18)

== Results ==
=== Men's freestyle ===
==== Men's freestyle 57 kg ====
Legend

- F — Won by fall
- WO — Won by walkover

Round of 16
Bryan Oliveira (BRA)	9
David Almendra (ARG)	10^{F}
Luis Basilio (DOM)	5
Santiago Hernández (CUB)	7
Camilo Fierro (CHI)	0
Edwin Guerra (GUA)	10
Darthe Capellan (CAN)	11
Brandon Escobar (HON)	1
Esteban Morales (ECU)	5
Óscar Tigreros (COL)	15
Enrique Herrera (PER)	0
Pedro Mejías (VEN)	10
Jesús Garfias (MEX)	0
Darian Cruz (PUR)	8

Quarterfinals
Thomas Gilman (USA)	11
Hernán Almendra (ARG)	0
Santiago Hernández (CUB)	2
Edwin Guerra (GUA)	1
Darthe Capellan (CAN)	WO
Óscar Tigreros (COL)
Pedro Mejías (VEN)	4
Darian Cruz (PUR)	7

Semifinals
Thomas Gilman (USA)	11
Santiago Hernández (CUB)	0
Darthe Capellan (CAN)	4
Darian Cruz (PUR)	8

Final
Thomas Gilman (USA)	10
Darian Cruz (PUR)	0

Repechage round 1
Jesús Garfias (MEX)	0
Pedro Mejías (VEN)	11

Bronze medal match
David Almendra (ARG)	3
Santiago Hernández (CUB)	8
Pedro Mejías (VEN)	10
Darthe Capellan (CAN)	7

==== Men's freestyle 61 kg ====
6 May

Pos	Athlete	Pld	W	L	CP	TP	USA	PUR	CAN	BRA	ARG
1	Vito Arujau (USA)	4	4	0	16	45	—	11–0	14–4	10–0	10–0
2	Joey Silva (PUR)	4	3	1	13	26	0–4 SU	—	10–0	10–0	6–0 Fall
3	Jason-Guy Luneau (CAN)	4	2	2	9	27	1–4 SU1	0–4 SU	—	10–0	13–2
4	Juan Queiroz (BRA)	4	1	3	5	9	0–4 SU	0–4 SU	0–4 SU	—	9–2 Fall
5	Wilson Ojeda (ARG)	4	0	4	1	4	0–4 SU	0–5 FA	1–4 SU1	0–5 FA	—

Source: UWW

==== Men's freestyle 65 kg ====
Legend

- F — Won by fall

Round of 32
	Score	
Úber Cuero (COL)	11–0	Austin Gomez (MEX)
André Quispe (CHI)	10–0	Esteban Pérez (GUA)

Round of 16
Sebastian Rivera (PUR)	11
Matheus Barreto (BRA)	0
Úber Cuero (COL)	9^{F}
Jordan Mitchell (JAM)	0
Jacob Torres (CAN)	11
Sergio Godoy (ECU)	1
Álbaro Rudesindo (DOM)	0
Alejandro Valdés (CUB)	2^{F}
Agustín Destribats (ARG)	10
Marvin Chávez (BOL)	0
Wilfredo Rodríguez (VEN)	10^{F}
Andrés Pérez (URU)	0
Wilfredo López (PAN)	18
André Quispe (CHI)	13
Sixto Auccapiña (PER)	0
Yianni Diakomihalis (USA)	10

Quarterfinals
Sebastian Rivera (PUR)	10
Úber Cuero (COL)	0
Jacob Torres (CAN)	0
Alejandro Valdés (CUB)	10
Agustín Destribats (ARG)	10
Wilfredo Rodríguez (VEN)	2
Wilfredo López (PAN)	0
Yianni Diakomihalis (USA)	11

Semifinals
Sebastian Rivera (PUR)	0
Alejandro Valdés (CUB)	10
Agustín Destribats (ARG)	8
Yianni Diakomihalis (USA)	9

Final
Alejandro Valdés (CUB)	1
Yianni Diakomihalis (USA)	4

Repechage round 2
Álbaro Rudesindo (DOM)	10
Jacob Torres (CAN)	0
Sixto Pedragas (PER)	11
Wilfredo López (PAN)	0

Bronze medal match
Álbaro Rudesindo (DOM)	2
Sebastian Rivera (PUR)	9
Sixto Auccapiña (PER)	0
Agustín Destribats (ARG)	11

==== Men's freestyle 70 kg ====
Legend

- F — Won by fall

6 May

Pos	Athlete	Pld	W	L	CP	TP	USA	ARG	PUR
1	Zain Retherford (USA)	2	2	0	9	14	—	4–0 Fall	10–0
2	Mauricio Lovera (ARG)	2	1	1	4	14	0–5 FA	—	14–4
3	Francisco Guzmán (PUR)	2	0	2	1	4	0–4 SU	1–4 SU1	—

Source: UWW

Pos	Athlete	Pld	W	L	CP	TP	CAN	BRA	CHI
1	Connor Quinton (CAN)	2	2	0	8	20	—	10–0	10–0
2	Vinicius Joaquim (BRA)	2	1	1	4	19	0–4 SU	—	19–7
3	Jorge Gatica (CHI)	2	0	2	1	7	0–4 SU	1–4 SU1	—

Source: UWW

Semifinals
Zain Retherford (USA)	12
Vinicius Joaquim (BRA)	2
Connor Quinton (CAN)	2^{F}
Mauricio Lovera (ARG)	2

Final
Zain Retherford (USA)	3^{F}
Connor Quinton (CAN)	0
Bronze medal
Vinicius Joaquim (BRA)	4
Mauricio Lovera (ARG)	6

==== Men's freestyle 74 kg ====
Legend

- F — Won by fall

Round of 32
	Score	
Lautaro Seghesso (ARG)	14–19	Ángel Cortés (PAN)
Anthony Montero (VEN)	10–0	Pablo Vera (PAR)

Round of 16
Kyle Dake (USA)	10
Mauricio Sánchez (ECU)	0
Ángel Cortés (PAN)	0
Adam Thomson (CAN)	8^{F}
Jhon Chunga (PER)	0
Luis Barrios (HON)	11
Julio Rodríguez (DOM)	2
Franklin Marén (CUB)	5
Franklin Gómez (PUR)	9
César Alvan (BRA)	6
Enrique Pérez (GUA)	9
León Peralta (CHI)	10
Hernán Guzmán (COL)	6
Anthony Montero (VEN)	7
Pedro Alarcón (BOL)	0
Anthony Valencia (MEX)	4^{F}

Quarterfinals
Kyle Dake (USA)	10
Adam Thomson (CAN)	0
Luis Barrios (HON)	2
Franklin Marén (CUB)	5
Franklin Gómez (PUR)	10
León Peralta (CHI)	0
Anthony Montero (VEN)	6
Anthony Valencia (MEX)	3

Semifinals
Kyle Dake (USA)	10
Franklin Marén (CUB)	0
Franklin Gómez (PUR)	6
Anthony Montero (VEN)	3

Final
Kyle Dake (USA)	10
Franklin Gómez (PUR)	0

Repechage round 2
Mauricio Sánchez (ECU)	3
Adam Thomson (CAN)	6^{F}
César Alvan (BRA)	10
León Peralta (CHI)	0

Bronze medal match
Adam Thomson (CAN)	3
Franklin Marén (CUB)	4
César Alvan (BRA)	4
Anthony Montero (VEN)	2

==== Men's freestyle 79 kg ====
Legend

- F — Won by fall
- WO — Won by walkover

Round of 16
Eduardo Gallardo (ARG)	0
Alexander Cusinga (PER)	10

Quarterfinals
Jordan Burroughs (USA)	10
Alexander Cusinga (PER)	0
Néstor Tafur (COL)	WO
~~Adrian Maynard (BAR)~~
Jasmit Phulka (CAN)	4
Shane Jones (PUR)	4
Victor Hernández (MEX)	8
Renato da Silva (BRA)	4

Semifinals
Jordan Burroughs (USA)	10
Néstor Tafur (COL)	0
Jasmit Phulka (CAN)	4
Victor Hernández (MEX)	2

Final
Jordan Burroughs (USA)	10
Jasmit Phulka (CAN)	0

Bronze medal match
Alexander Cusinga (PER)	0
Néstor Tafur (COL)	10
Shane Jones (PUR)	11
Victor Hernández (MEX)	0

==== Men's freestyle 86 kg ====
Legend

- F — Won by fall

Round of 16
Mark Hall (USA)	10
Jorge Llano (ARG)	0
Eduardo Gajardo (CHI)	4
César Ubico (GUA)	9
Bruno Nicoletti (BRA)	8
Christian Anguiano (MEX)	1
Diego González (PUR)	0
Yurieski Torreblanca (CUB)	10
Alex Moore (CAN)	10
Andrew Vera-Jackson (BOL)	0
Julio Rodríguez (PAN)	2
Carlos Izquierdo (COL)	6^{F}
Jorge Andy (ECU)	4^{F}
Rashji Mackey (BAH)	0
Yorfi Jiménez (DOM)	1
Pedro Ceballos (VEN)	5

Quarterfinals
Mark Hall (USA)	12
César Ubico (GUA)	2
Bruno Nicoletti (BRA)	0
Yurieski Torreblanca (CUB)	10
Alex Moore (CAN)	7
Carlos Izquierdo (COL)	3
Jorge Andy (ECU)	0
Pedro Ceballos (VEN)	11

Semifinals
Mark Hall (USA)	4
Yurieski Torreblanca (CUB)	14
Alex Moore (CAN)	5
Pedro Ceballos (VEN)	2

Final
Yurieski Torreblanca (CUB)	5
Alex Moore (CAN)	1

Repechage round 1
Diego González (PUR)	0
Bruno Nicoletti (BRA)	10
Andrew Vera-Jackson (BOL)	0
Carlos Izquierdo (COL)	11

Bronze medal match
Bruno Nicoletti (BRA)	0
Mark Hall (USA)	11
Carlos Izquierdo (COL)	7
Pedro Ceballos (VEN)	6

==== Men's freestyle 92 kg ====
5 May

Pos	Athlete	Pld	W	L	CP	TP	USA	CAN	ECU	PUR	ARG
1	Michael Macchiavello (USA)	4	4	0	18	31	—	10–0 Fall	10–0	11–0	WO
2	Jérémy Poirier (CAN)	4	3	1	11	14	0–5 FA	—	6–3	8–2	WO
3	Alejandro Villagómez (ECU)	4	2	2	11	11	0–4 SU	1–3 PO1	—	8–0 Ret	WO
4	Luis Rivera (PUR)	4	1	3	6	2	0–4 SU	1–3 PO1	0–5 IN	—	WO
—	Sebastián Reiss (ARG)	4	0	4	0	0	0–5 FO	0–5 FO	0–5 FO	0–5 FO	—

Source: UWW

==== Men's freestyle 97 kg ====
Legend

- F — Won by fall

Round of 16
Maxwell Lacey (CRC)	11
Ailton Rocha (BRA)	0
Huberth Soliz (BOL)	0
Carlos Angulo (COL)	6^{F}
Luis Miguel Pérez (DOM)	10
Cristián Sánchez (MEX)	0
Ricardo Báez (ARG)	4
Arturo Silot (CUB)	14
Juan Cantillo (PAN)	0
Cristian Sarco (VEN)	12
Marcos Santos (PUR)	10
Matías Uribe (CHI)	0

Quarterfinals
Kyle Snyder (USA)	10
Maxwell Lacey (CRC)	0
Carlos Angulo (COL)	1
Luis Miguel Pérez (DOM)	12
Arturo Silot (CUB)	4
Cristian Sarco (VEN)	1
Marcos Santos (PUR)	0
Nishan Randhawa (CAN)	10

Semifinals
Kyle Snyder (USA)	10^{F}
Luis Miguel Pérez (DOM)	2
Arturo Silot (CUB)	10
Nishan Randhawa (CAN)	0

Final
Kyle Snyder (USA)	14
Arturo Silot (CUB)	3

Repechage round 1
Ricardo Báez (ARG)	3
Cristian Sarco (VEN)	2

Bronze medal match
Maxwell Lacey (CRC)	2
Luis Miguel Pérez (DOM)	6^{F}
Ricardo Báez (ARG)	1
Nishan Randhawa (CAN)	5

==== Men's freestyle 125 kg ====
Legend

- F — Won by fall
- WO — Won by walkover

Round of 16
Guilherme Pradella (BRA)	0
Jonovan Smith (PUR)	11
Miguel Sánchez (MEX)	0
Elison Adames (DOM)	8
Heriberto Sandi (CRC)	1
Diego Almendras (CHI)	8
Karanveer Mahil (CAN)	2
Aaron Johnson (JAM)	3

Quarterfinals
Catriel Muriel (ARG)	15
Jonovan Smith (PUR)	8
Elison Adames (DOM)	1
Dominique Bradley (USA)	11
Reineris Salas (CUB)	10
Diego Almendras (CHI)	0
Aaron Johnson (JAM)	0
José Daniel Díaz (VEN)	4

Semifinals
Catriel Muriel (ARG)	0
Dominique Bradley (USA)	10^{F}
Reineris Salas (CUB)	1
José Daniel Díaz (VEN)	4

Final
Dominique Bradley (USA)	2
José Daniel Díaz (VEN)	1

Bronze medal match
Elison Adames (DOM)	2
Catriel Muriel (ARG)	5
Aaron Johnson (JAM)	WO
Reineris Salas (CUB)

=== Men's Greco-Roman ===
==== Men's Greco-Roman 55 kg ====
3 May

Pos	Athlete	Pld	W	L	CP	TP	USA	MEX	ARG
1	Dalton Duffield (USA)	2	2	0	9	13	—	4–0 Fall	9–0
2	José Rodríguez (MEX)	2	1	1	4	9	0–5 FA	—	9–0
3	Axel Rolón (ARG)	2	0	2	0	0	0–4 SU	0–4 SU	—

Source: UWW

==== Men's Greco-Roman 60 kg ====
Legend

- F — Won by fall
- R — Retired
- WO — Won by walkover

Round of 16
Raiber Rodríguez (VEN)	8
Samuel Mesropian (ARG)	0
Yerony Liria (DOM)	5
Joshua Medina (PUR)	1
Alexis Rodríguez (MEX)	8
Erivan Rocha (BRA)	0
Jeremy Peralta (ECU)	8
Emerson Felipe (GUA)	0
Cristóbal Torres (CHI)	0
Joao Benavides (PER)	9

Quarterfinals
Dalton Roberts (USA)	9
Raiber Rodríguez (VEN)	0
Yerony Liria (DOM)	0
Alexis Rodríguez (MEX)	9
Kevin de Armas (CUB)	1
Jeremy Peralta (ECU)	2^{F}
Joao Benavides (PER)	0
Dicther Toro (COL)	8

Semifinals
Dalton Roberts (USA)	8
Alexis Rodríguez (MEX)	0
Jeremy Peralta (ECU)	9
Dicther Toro (COL)	4^{R}

Final
Dalton Roberts (USA)	9
Jeremy Peralta (ECU)	0

Repechage round 1
Emerson Felipe (GUA)	3
Kevin de Armas (CUB)	8

Bronze medal match
Raiber Rodríguez (VEN)	7
Alexis Rodríguez (MEX)	2
Kevin de Armas (CUB)	WO
Dicther Toro (COL)

==== Men's Greco-Roman 67 kg ====
Legend

- F — Won by fall
- WO — Won by walkover

Round of 16
Calebe Ferreira (BRA)	5
Andrés Montaño (ECU)	5
Leomar Cordero (VEN)	1
Edson Olmos (MEX)	1
Cristian Mejía (GUA)	0
Mauricio Lovera (ARG)	8
Julián Horta (COL)	8
Robert Perez (USA)	0
Nilton Soto (PER)	9
Royglen Temple (PAN)	0
Enyer Feliciano (DOM)	9
Lisandro Cabrera (PAR)	0

Quarterfinals
Luis Orta (CUB)	6
Andrés Montaño (ECU)	0
Edson Olmos (MEX)	4
Mauricio Lovera (ARG)	3
Julián Horta (COL)	4
Nilton Soto (PER)	3
Enyer Feliciano (DOM)	2
Néstor Almanza (CHI)	5

Semifinals
Luis Orta (CUB)	9
Edson Olmos (MEX)	0
Julián Horta (COL)	4
Néstor Almanza (CHI)	4

Final
Luis Orta (CUB)	WO
Néstor Almanza (CHI)

Bronze medal match
Andrés Montaño (ECU)	6
Edson Olmos (MEX)	1
Enyer Feliciano (DOM)	2
Julián Horta (COL)	9

==== Men's Greco-Roman 72 kg ====
Legend

- F — Won by fall

3 May

Pos	Athlete	Pld	W	L	CP	TP	USA	GUA	CAN
1	Justus Scott (USA)	2	2	0	8	18	—	9–1	9–0
2	Alejandro Varela (GUA)	2	1	1	5	12	1–4 SU1	—	11–2
3	Cole Sanderson (CAN)	2	0	2	1	2	0–4 SU	1–4 SU1	—

Source: UWW

Pos	Athlete	Pld	W	L	CP	TP	BRA	PER	ARG
1	Kenedy Pedrosa (BRA)	2	2	0	6	13	—	8–5	5–0
2	Jesus Guzmán (PER)	2	1	1	5	13	1–3 PO1	—	8–0
3	Horacio Miranda (ARG)	2	0	2	0	0	0–3 PO	0–4 SU	—

Source: UWW

Semifinals
Justus Scott (USA)	9
Jesus Guzmán (PER)	0
Kenedy Pedrosa (BRA)	3
Alejandro Varela (GUA)	1

Final
Justus Scott (USA)	6
Kenedy Pedrosa (BRA)	2
Bronze medal
Jesus Guzmán (PER)	1
Alejandro Varela (GUA)	3

==== Men's Greco-Roman 77 kg ====
Legend

- F — Won by fall

Round of 16
Luis de León (DOM)	3
Eduardo Bernal (CHI)	1
Kamal Bey (USA)	4
Jair Cuero (COL)	2
Alvis Almendra (PAN)	1
David Choc (GUA)	5
Yosvanys Peña (CUB)	9
Adrian Maynard (BAR)	0
~~Carlos Espinoza (PER)~~
Luis Centeno (PUR)	WO
Enrique Cuero (ECU)	0
Wuileixis Rivas (VEN)	9

Quarterfinals
Emmanuel Benítez (MEX)	9
Luis de León (DOM)	0
Kamal Bey (USA)	12
David Choc (GUA)	3
Yosvanys Peña (CUB)	9
Luis Centeno (PUR)	0
Wuileixis Rivas (VEN)	5
Joílson Júnior (BRA)	2

Semifinals
Emmanuel Benítez (MEX)	1
Kamal Bey (USA)	5
Yosvanys Peña (CUB)	4
Wuileixis Rivas (VEN)	1

Final
Kamal Bey (USA)	2
Yosvanys Peña (CUB)	1

Repechage round 1
Jair Cuero (COL)	8
David Choc (GUA)	0
Adrian Maynard (BAR)	1
Luis Centeno (PUR)	11

Bronze medal match
Jair Cuero (COL)	6
Emmanuel Benítez (MEX)	3
Luis Centeno (PUR)
Wuileixis Rivas (VEN)	WO

==== Men's Greco-Roman 82 kg ====
4 May

Pos	Athlete	Pld	W	L	CP	TP	USA	COL	CAN	MEX
1	Spencer Woods (USA)	3	3	0	13	20	—	9–0	11–0	WO
2	José Mosquera (COL)	3	2	1	8	19	0–4 SU	—	11–0	8–0
3	John Yeats (CAN)	3	1	2	4	8	0–4 SU	0–4 SU	—	8–0
4	Javier Gómez (MEX)	3	0	3	0	0	0–5 IN	0–4 SU	0–4 SU	—

Source: UWW

==== Men's Greco-Roman 87 kg ====
Legend

- F — Won by fall

Round of 16
Carlos Muñoz (COL)	9
Guillermo González (CHI)	0
Ariel Alfonso (HON)	5
Johan Batista (DOM)	3
Alfonso Jaramillo (PAN)	0
Daniel Grégorich (CUB)	9
Daniel Vicente (MEX)	3
Pool Ambrocio (PER)	3

Quarterfinals
Luis Avendaño (VEN)	8
Carlos Muñoz (COL)	0
Ariel Alfonso (HON)	9
José Jourdan (PUR)	0
Ronisson Brandão (BRA)	0
Daniel Grégorich (CUB)	8^{F}
Daniel Vicente (MEX)	1
Alan Vera (USA)	5

Semifinals
Luis Avendaño (VEN)	5
Ariel Alfonso (HON)	1
Daniel Grégorich (CUB)	10
Alan Vera (USA)	1

Final
Luis Avendaño (VEN)
Daniel Grégorich (CUB)	WO

Repechage round 1
Alfonso Jaramillo (PAN)	0
Ronisson Brandão (BRA)	8

Bronze medal match
Carlos Muñoz (COL)	9
Ariel Alfonso (HON)	0
Ronisson Brandão (BRA)	1
Alan Vera (USA)	4

==== Men's Greco-Roman 97 kg ====
Legend

- F — Won by fall
- WO — Won by walkover

Round of 16
Yurisandy Hernández (CUB)	1
Joe Rau (USA)	5
~~Jean Nazareno (ECU)~~
Max Madrid (PAN)	WO
Kevin Mejía (HON)	9^{F}
Luis Rivera (MEX)	0
Luis Rivera (PUR)	19
Jhonny Arias (COL)	15

Quarterfinals
Luillys Pérez (VEN)	1
Joe Rau (USA)	2
Max Madrid (PAN)	0
Carlos Adames (DOM)	7
Ricardo Gómez (ARG)	0
Kevin Mejía (HON)	8
Luis Rivera (PUR)	0
Igor Queiroz (BRA)	11

Semifinals
Joe Rau (USA)	8
Carlos Adames (DOM)	0
Kevin Mejía (HON)	9
Igor Queiroz (BRA)	0

Final
Joe Rau (USA)	WO
Kevin Mejía (HON)

Repechage round 1
Yurisandy Hernández (CUB)	1
Luillys Pérez (VEN)	2
Luis Rivera (MEX)	2
Ricardo Gómez (ARG)	2

Bronze medal match
Luillys Pérez (VEN)	0
Carlos Adames (DOM)	9
Ricardo Gómez (ARG)	0
Igor Queiroz (BRA)	9

==== Men's Greco-Roman 130 kg ====
Legend

- F — Won by fall
- WO — Won by walkover

Round of 16
Gino Ávila (HON)	9
Rodolfo Waithe (PAN)	0
Donald Longendyke (USA)	7^{F}
Leo Santana (DOM)	0

Quarterfinals
Eduard Soghomonyan (BRA)	5
Gino Ávila (HON)	2^{F}
Paul Morales (MEX)	1
Moisés Pérez (VEN)	3
Yasmani Acosta (CHI)	9
Edgardo López (PUR)	0
Donald Longendyke (USA)	0
Óscar Pino (CUB)	9

Semifinals
Gino Ávila (HON)	5
Moisés Pérez (VEN)	3
Yasmani Acosta (CHI)	1
Óscar Pino (CUB)	3

Final
Gino Ávila (HON)
Óscar Pino (CUB)	WO

Repechage round 1
Rodolfo Waithe (PAN)	0
Eduard Soghomonyan (BRA)	9

Bronze medal match
Eduard Soghomonyan (BRA)	5
Moisés Pérez (VEN)	3
Donald Longendyke (USA)	0
Yasmani Acosta (CHI)	8

=== Women's freestyle ===
==== Women's freestyle 50 kg ====
Legend

- F — Won by fall

Round of 16
Thalia Freitas (BRA)	10^{F}
Jessica Corredor (PUR)	3
Nathaly Herrera (PER)	0
Mariana Rojas (VEN)	6
Mariana Díaz (MEX)	2
Yusneylys Guzmán (CUB)	8
Yorlenis Morán (PAN)	7^{F}
Fabiana Díaz (DOM)	0
Estefani Estupiñan (COL)	0
Jacqueline Mollocana (ECU)	11

Quarterfinals
Sarah Hildebrandt (USA)	10
Thalia Freitas (BRA)	0
Mariana Rojas (VEN)	0
Yusneylys Guzmán (CUB)	7
Patricia Bermúdez (ARG)	12
Yorlenis Morán (PAN)	4
Jacqueline Mollocana (ECU)	9
Madison Parks (CAN)	6

Semifinals
Sarah Hildebrandt (USA)	10
Yusneylys Guzmán (CUB)	0
Patricia Bermúdez (ARG)	0
Jacqueline Mollocana (ECU)	4

Final
Sarah Hildebrandt (USA)	10
Jacqueline Mollocana (ECU)	0

Repechage round 1
Estefani Estupiñan (COL)	0
Madison Parks (CAN)	4^{F}

Bronze medal match
Thalia Freitas (BRA)	0
Yusneylys Guzmán (CUB)	6^{F}
Madison Parks (CAN)	5
Patricia Bermúdez (ARG)	11^{F}

==== Women's freestyle 53 kg ====
Legend

- F — Won by fall

Round of 16
Betzabeth Argüello (VEN)	6^{F}
Sabrina Tapajós (BRA)	0
Kathia Caballero (PAN)	WO
~~Samantha Stewart (CAN)~~
Patricia Sosa (ARG)	0
Karla Acosta (MEX)	8^{F}
Laura Herin (CUB)	10
Antonia Valdés (CHI)	0
María González (DOM)	1
María Ramírez (COL)	13
Thalía Mallqui (PER)	7
Gabriela Ramos (PUR)	5

Quarterfinals
Dominique Parrish (USA)	6
Betzabeth Argüello (VEN)	8
Kathia Caballero (PAN)	0
Karla Acosta (MEX)	4^{F}
Laura Herin (CUB)	10
María Ramírez (COL)	0
Thalía Mallqui (PER)	0
Lucía Yépez (ECU)	8^{F}

Semifinals
Betzabeth Argüello (VEN)	3^{F}
Karla Acosta (MEX)	2
Laura Herin (CUB)	2
Lucía Yépez (ECU)	5

Final
Betzabeth Argüello (VEN)	1
Lucía Yépez (ECU)	5

Repechage round 1
Sabrina Tapajós (BRA)	0
Dominique Parrish (USA)	10

Bronze medal match
Dominique Parrish (USA)	2
Karla Acosta (MEX)	4
Thalía Mallqui (PER)	0
Laura Herin (CUB)	11

==== Women's freestyle 55 kg ====
4 May

Pos	Athlete	Pld	W	L	CP	TP	CAN	USA	ARG
1	Diana Weicker (CAN)	2	2	0	7	17	—	5–0	12–2
2	Alisha Howk (USA)	2	1	1	3	2	0–3 PO	—	2–1
3	Adrianny Castillo (ARG)	2	0	2	2	3	1–4 SU1	1–3 PO1	—

Source: UWW

==== Women's freestyle 57 kg ====
Legend

- F — Won by fall

Round of 16
Susana Lozano (MEX)	1
Ángela Álvarez (CUB)	2
Yusmy Chaparro (COL)	2
Nes Marie Rodríguez (PUR)	12
Irichell Vargas (PAN)	0
Luisa Valverde (ECU)	10
Hannah Taylor (CAN)	9^{F}
Veralucia Susano (BOL)	0
Jacqueline Hernández (ESA)	0
Betzabeth Sarco (VEN)	6^{F}
Dafne Palacios (CHI)	0
Camila Amarilla (ARG)	12
Yocleidy Ramírez (DOM)	2
Giullia Penalber (BRA)	7

Quarterfinals
Helen Maroulis (USA)	5
Ángela Álvarez (CUB)	7
Nes Marie Rodríguez (PUR)	0
Luisa Valverde (ECU)	4^{F}
Hannah Taylor (CAN)	3
Betzabeth Sarco (VEN)	6
Camila Amarilla (ARG)	0
Giullia Penalber (BRA)	10^{F}

Semifinals
Ángela Álvarez (CUB)	0
Luisa Valverde (ECU)	4^{F}
Betzabeth Sarco (VEN)	4
Giullia Penalber (BRA)	7

Final
Luisa Valverde (ECU)	4
Giullia Penalber (BRA)	2

Repechage round 1
Irichell Vargas (PAN)	0
Nes Marie Rodríguez (PUR)	8^{F}
Yocleidy Ramírez (DOM)	8
Camila Amarilla (ARG)	10

Bronze medal match
Nes Marie Rodríguez (PUR)	0
Ángela Álvarez (CUB)	13^{F}
Camila Amarilla (ARG)	0
Betzabeth Sarco (VEN)	2^{F}

==== Women's freestyle 59 kg ====
4 May

Pos	Athlete	Pld	W	L	CP	TP	USA	CAN	BAR
1	Xochitl Mota-Pettis (USA)	2	2	0	8	20	—	10–0	10–0
2	Alexandria Town (CAN)	2	1	1	5	6	0–4 SU	—	6–0 Fall
3	Jessica Derrell (BAR)	2	0	2	0	0	0–4 SU	0–5 FA	—

Source: UWW

==== Women's freestyle 62 kg ====
Legend

- F — Won by fall

Round of 16
Leonela Ayoví (ECU)	5^{F}
Alejandra Brítez (ARG)	0
Yoelisa Contreras (DOM)	1
Javiera Roco (CHI)	4^{F}
María Santana (CUB)	6
Karoline Ortiz (PUR)	1
Katherine Rentería (COL)	12
Alexis Gómez (MEX)	2

Quarterfinals
Kayla Miracle (USA)	12
Leonela Ayoví (ECU)	2
Javiera Roco (CHI)	0
Nathaly Grimán (VEN)	10
Laís Nunes (BRA)	7^{F}
María Santana (CUB)	1
Katherine Rentería (COL)	0
Ana Godinez (CAN)	10

Semifinals
Kayla Miracle (USA)	0
Nathaly Grimán (VEN)	8^{F}
Laís Nunes (BRA)	5
Ana Godinez (CAN)	10

Final
Nathaly Grimán (VEN)	1
Ana Godinez (CAN)	4^{F}

Bronze medal match
Javiera Roco (CHI)	0
Kayla Miracle (USA)	10
Katherine Rentería (COL)	0
Laís Nunes (BRA)	6^{F}

==== Women's freestyle 65 kg ====
4 May

Pos	Athlete	Pld	W	L	CP	TP	USA	COL	CAN
1	Mallory Velte (USA)	2	2	0	8	22	—	12–2	10–0
2	Paula Montoya (COL)	2	1	1	6	6	1–4 SU1	—	4–0 Fall
3	Aleah Nickel (CAN)	2	0	2	0	0	0–4 SU	0–5 FA	—

Source: UWW

==== Women's freestyle 68 kg ====
Legend

- F — Won by fall

Round of 16
Yanet Sovero (PER)	8
Aidé Cuero (COL)	4
Natalie Ovando (CHI)	2
Sonia Berríos (PUR)	10^{F}
Gloria Segura (DOM)	WO
~~Thamires Machado (BRA)~~
Olivia Di Bacco (CAN)	4
Hangelen Llanes (CUB)	8

Quarterfinals
Ámbar Garnica (MEX)	10
Yanet Sovero (PER)	1
Sonia Berríos (PUR)	2
Saidy Chávez (HON)	8^{F}
Soleymi Caraballo (VEN)	10
Gloria Segura (DOM)	0
Hangelen Llanes (CUB)	0
Forrest Molinari (USA)	11

Semifinals
Ámbar Garnica (MEX)	4^{F}
Saidy Chávez (HON)	0
Soleymi Caraballo (VEN)	5
Forrest Molinari (USA)	12

Final
Ámbar Garnica (MEX)	0
Forrest Molinari (USA)	2^{F}

Bronze medal match
Yanet Sovero (PER)	3
Saidy Chávez (HON)	1
Hangelen Llanes (CUB)	8
Soleymi Caraballo (VEN)	3

==== Women's freestyle 72 kg ====
4 May

Pos	Athlete	Pld	W	L	CP	TP	USA	COL	CAN	BRA	CHI
1	Amit Elor (USA)	4	4	0	17	36	—	10–0	6–0 Fall	10–0	10–0
2	Luisa Mosquera (COL)	4	3	1	9	16	0–4 SU	—	7–5	3–2	6–0
3	Katie Mulkay (CAN)	4	2	2	7	15	0–5 FA	1–3 PO1	—	6–4	4–0
4	Meiriele Hora (BRA)	4	1	3	6	16	0–4 SU	1–3 PO1	1–3 PO1	—	10–0
5	Isidora Díaz (CHI)	4	0	4	0	0	0–4 SU	0–3 PO	0–3 PO	0–4 SU	—

Source: UWW

==== Women's freestyle 76 kg ====
Legend

- F — Won by fall

Round of 16
Mahealani Ramírez (URU)	2
Atzimba Landaverde (MEX)	5
Beatriz dos Reis (BRA)	2
Emelyn Bautista (DOM)	4^{F}
María Acosta (VEN)	4
Tristan Kelly (USA)	3
Linda Machuca (ARG)	5^{F}
Natalia Rodríguez (PUR)	0

Quarterfinals
Génesis Reasco (ECU)	10
Atzimba Landaverde (MEX)	0
Emelyn Bautista (DOM)	0
Milaimys Marín (CUB)	10
Tatiana Rentería (COL)	5^{F}
María Acosta (VEN)	0
Linda Machuca (ARG)	1
Justina Di Stasio (CAN)	2

Semifinals
Génesis Reasco (ECU)	1
Milaimys Marín (CUB)	2
Tatiana Rentería (COL)	3
Justina Di Stasio (CAN)	3

Final
Milaimys Marín (CUB)	7
Tatiana Rentería (COL)	0

Bronze medal match
Emelyn Bautista (DOM)	0
Génesis Reasco (ECU)	11
María Acosta (VEN)	1
Justina Di Stasio (CAN)	4

== See also ==
- Wrestling at the 2023 Pan American Games
