= Wrestling at the 2014 Central American and Caribbean Games =

- Venue: World Trade Center Veracruz
- Location: Veracruz, Mexico
- Dates: 25–29 November

The wrestling competition at the 2014 Central American and Caribbean Games was held in Veracruz, Mexico.

The tournament was scheduled to be held from 25 to 29 November at the World Trade Center Veracruz.

== Medal summary ==
=== Men's events ===
Event	Gold	Silver	Bronze
Freestyle 57 kg	Pedro Mejías (VEN)	Kevin Bonilla (HON)	Juan Ramírez (DOM); Erick Romero (NCA)
Freestyle 65 kg	Franklin Gómez (PUR)	Alejandro Valdes (CUB)	Luis Portillo (ESA); Brandon Díaz (MEX)
Freestyle 74 kg	Livan López (CUB)	Christian Anguiano (MEX)	Edison Hurtado (COL); Pedro Soto (PUR)
Freestyle 86 kg	Reineris Salas (CUB)	Pedro Ceballos (VEN)	Juan Martínez (COL); Jaime Espinal (PUR)
Freestyle 97 kg	Javier Cortina (CUB)	Jesse Ruiz (MEX)	Jose Diaz (VEN); Kevin Mejía (HON)
Freestyle 125 kg	Eduardo Mesa (CUB)	Josué Encarnación (DOM)	Luis Vivenes (VEN); Rodolfo Waithe (PAN)
Greco-Roman 59 kg	Ismael Borrero (CUB)	Jansel Ramírez (DOM)	Ali Soto (MEX); Jairo Medina (VEN)
Greco-Roman 66 kg	Miguel Martínez (CUB)	Jair Cuero (COL)	Jefrin Mejía (HON); Manuel López (MEX)
Greco-Roman 75 kg	Juan Escobar (MEX)	Yorgen Cova (VEN)	Carlos Muñoz (COL); Luis Centeno (PUR)
Greco-Roman 85 kg	Pablo Shorey (CUB)	Alexander Brazon (VEN)	Cristhian Mosquera (COL); Luis Betancourt (PUR)
Greco-Roman 98 kg	Yasmany Lugo (CUB)	Erwin Caraballo (VEN)	Kevin Mejía (HON); José Rocha (MEX)
Greco-Roman 130 kg	Mijain López (CUB)	Ramón García (DOM)	Edgardo López (PUR); Rafael Barreno (VEN)

=== Women's events ===
Event	Gold	Silver	Bronze
Freestyle 48 kg	Carolina Castillo (COL)	Yusneylys Guzmán (CUB)	Mariana Díaz Muñoz (MEX); Mayelis Caripá (VEN)
Freestyle 53 kg	Alma Valencia (MEX)	Nes Marie Rodríguez (PUR)	Brenda Bailey (HON); Betzabeth Argüello (VEN)
Freestyle 58 kg	Alejandra Romero (MEX)	Yakelin Estornell (CUB)	Virginia Jimenez (VEN); Sandra Roa (COL)
Freestyle 63 kg	Jackeline Rentería (COL)	Soleymi Caraballo (VEN)	Josselyn Portillo (ESA); Katerina Vidiaux (CUB)
Freestyle 69 kg	Diana Miranda (MEX)	Leidy Izquierdo (COL)	Saidy Chávez (HON); María Acosta (VEN)
Freestyle 75 kg	Lisset Hechevarria (CUB)	Lizabeth Rodríguez (PUR)	María García (MEX); Jaramit Weffer (VEN)

== Medal table ==
* Host nation (Mexico)

Rank	Nation	Gold	Silver	Bronze	Total
1	Cuba (CUB)	10	3	1	14
2	Mexico (MEX)*	4	2	6	12
3	Colombia (COL)	2	2	5	9
4	Venezuela (VEN)	1	5	9	15
5	Puerto Rico (PUR)	1	2	5	8
6	Dominican Republic (DOM)	0	3	1	4
7	Honduras (HON)	0	1	5	6
8	El Salvador (ESA)	0	0	2	2
9	Nicaragua (NCA)	0	0	1	1
9	Panama (PAN)	0	0	1	1
Totals (10 entries)		18	18	36	72
