= 2020 Pan American Wrestling Olympic Qualification Tournament =

- Venue: Shaw Centre
- Location: Ottawa, Canada
- Dates: 13–15 March 2020

The 2020 Olympic Wrestling Pan American Qualification Tournament was the first regional qualifying tournament for the 2020 Summer Olympics. The event was held from 13 to 15 March 2020, in Ottawa, Canada.

== Qualification summary ==
A total of 36 athletes secured a spot in the 2020 Summer Olympics, in Tokyo. Two spots were given to each of the weight classes. This allows a total of 12 available spots for each event. Every winner and runner-up per class were awarded their place for wrestling, at the 2020 Summer Olympics. Quota places are allocated to the respective NOC and not to competitor that achieved the place in the qualification event.

NOC	Men's freestyle						Men's Greco-Roman						Women's freestyle						Total
NOC	57	65	74	86	97	125	60	67	77	87	97	130	50	53	57	62	68	76	Total
Argentina		X																	1
Brazil												X				X		X	3
Canada					X	X											X	X	4
Chile												X							1
Colombia	X							X											2
Cuba		X	X		X		X		X	X	X		X	X			X		10
Mexico									X						X				2
Peru				X															1
Puerto Rico			X																1
United States	X			X		X	X	X		X	X		X	X	X	X			11
Total: 10 NOCs	2	2	2	2	2	2	2	2	2	2	2	2	2	2	2	2	2	2	36

== Men's freestyle ==
=== 57 kg ===
15 March

Round of 16
Ligrit Sadiku (CAN)	0
Thomas Gilman (USA)	10

Quarterfinals
Óscar Tigreros (COL)	10
Pedro Mejías (VEN)	6
Edwin Segura (GUA)	8
Bryan Oliveira (BRA)	10
Juan Rubelín Ramírez (DOM)	16
Roberto Alejandro (MEX)	5
Thomas Gilman (USA)	4
Reineri Andreu (CUB)	3

Semifinals
Óscar Tigreros (COL)	6^{F}
Bryan Oliveira (BRA)	0
Juan Rubelín Ramírez (DOM)	0
Thomas Gilman (USA)	11

Final
Óscar Tigreros (COL)
Thomas Gilman (USA)	WO

Repechage round 1
Ligrit Sadiku (CAN)	0
Reineri Andreu (CUB)	10

Bronze medals
Pedro Mejías (VEN)	10
Bryan Oliveira (BRA)	0
Reineri Andreu (CUB)	4^{F}
Juan Rubelín Ramírez (DOM)	1

=== 65 kg ===
15 March

Round of 16
Brandon Díaz (MEX)	11
David Moreira (BRA)	0
José Javier Rodríguez (PUR)	0
Zain Retherford (USA)	10
Wilfredo Rodríguez (VEN)	5
Úber Cuero (COL)	9
Sixto Auccapiña (PER)	1
Álbaro Rudesindo (DOM)	7

Quarterfinals
Mauricio Sánchez (ECU)	0
Dillon Williams (CAN)	10
Alejandro Valdés (CUB)	10
Brandon Díaz (MEX)	0
Zain Retherford (USA)	10
Úber Cuero (COL)	0
Álbaro Rudesindo (DOM)	2
Agustín Destribats (ARG)	7

Semifinals
Dillon Williams (CAN)	0
Alejandro Valdés (CUB)	10
Zain Retherford (USA)	2
Agustín Destribats (ARG)	2^{F}

Final
Alejandro Valdés (CUB)	WO
Agustín Destribats (ARG)

Bronze medals
Brandon Díaz (MEX)	2
Dillon Williams (CAN)	9
Álbaro Rudesindo (DOM)	0
Zain Retherford (USA)	10^{F}

=== 74 kg ===
15 March

Round of 16
Victor Hernández (MEX)	2
Anthony Montero (VEN)	8
Julio Rodríguez (DOM)	10
León Peralta (CHI)	0
Ranico Howard (BAR)	0
Jorge Llano (ARG)	8^{F}

Quarterfinals
Franklin Gómez (PUR)	10
Jasmit Phulka (CAN)	7
Néstor Tafur (COL)	6^{F}
Marcus Calasans (BRA)	0
Anthony Montero (VEN)	4
Julio Rodríguez (DOM)	1
Jorge Llano (ARG)	2
Geandry Garzón (CUB)	6

Semifinals
Franklin Gómez (PUR)	9
Néstor Tafur (COL)	4
Anthony Montero (VEN)	8
Geandry Garzón (CUB)	12

Final
Franklin Gómez (PUR)
Geandry Garzón (CUB)	WO

Bronze medals
Jasmit Phulka (CAN)	5
Néstor Tafur (COL)	3
Jorge Llano (ARG)	3
Anthony Montero (VEN)	2

=== 86 kg ===
15 March

Round of 16
Clayton Pye (CAN)	0
Ricardo Báez (ARG)	10
Reuben Wiltshire (BAR)	0
Angus Arthur (JAM)	2^{F}
Gino Ávila (HON)	3
Noel Torres (MEX)	3

Quarterfinals
Yurieski Torreblanca (CUB)	6
Ethan Ramos (PUR)	4
Pedro Ceballos (VEN)	0
David Taylor (USA)	10^{F}
Ricardo Báez (ARG)	7
Angus Arthur (JAM)	11
Gino Ávila (HON)	1
Pool Ambrocio (PER)	4

Semifinals
Yurieski Torreblanca (CUB)	0
David Taylor (USA)	8
Angus Arthur (JAM)
Pool Ambrocio (PER)	WO

Final
David Taylor (USA)	WO
Pool Ambrocio (PER)

Bronze medals
Pedro Ceballos (VEN)	1
Yurieski Torreblanca (CUB)	2
Gino Ávila (HON)	WO
Angus Arthur (JAM)

- Angus Arthur of Jamaica originally finished 5th, but was later disqualified for doping.

=== 97 kg ===
15 March

Pos	Athlete	Pld	W	L	CP	TP	CUB	CAN	VEN	MEX
1	Reineris Salas (CUB)	3	3	0	11	27	—	5–0	12–1	10–0
2	Jordan Steen (CAN)	3	2	1	8	23	0–3 PO	—	12–1	11–0
3	José Daniel Díaz (VEN)	3	1	2	5	11	1–4 SU1	1–4 SU1	—	9–0
4	Miguel Sánchez (MEX)	3	0	3	0	0	0–4 SU	0–4 SU	0–3 PO	—

Source: UWW

Pos	Athlete	Pld	W	L	CP	TP	DOM	PUR	CRC
1	Luis Miguel Pérez (DOM)	2	2	0	7	22	—	9–6	13–3
2	Evan Ramos (PUR)	2	1	1	6	8	1–3 PO1	—	2–0 Ret
3	Maxwell Lacey (CRC)	2	0	2	1	3	1–4 SU1	0–5 IN	—

Source: UWW

Semifinals
Reineris Salas (CUB)	12
Evan Ramos (PUR)	1
Luis Miguel Pérez (DOM)	2
Jordan Steen (CAN)	13

Final
Reineris Salas (CUB)	WO
Jordan Steen (CAN)
Bronze medal
Evan Ramos (PUR)	0
Luis Miguel Pérez (DOM)	10

=== 125 kg ===
15 March

Pos	Athlete	Pld	W	L	CP	TP	USA	PUR	CUB
1	Nick Gwiazdowski (USA)	2	2	0	9	10	—	10–0	WO
2	Charles Merrill (PUR)	2	1	1	5	12	0–4 SU	—	12–4 Fall
3	Ángel Pacheco (CUB)	2	0	2	0	4	0–5 IN	0–5 FA	—

Source: UWW

Pos	Athlete	Pld	W	L	CP	TP	CAN	VEN	MEX
1	Amar Dhesi (CAN)	2	2	0	8	21	—	11–0	10–0
2	Luis Vivenes (VEN)	2	1	1	3	2	0–4 SU	—	2–1
3	Eduardo García (MEX)	2	0	2	1	1	0–4 SU	1–3 PO1	—

Source: UWW

Semifinals
Nick Gwiazdowski (USA)	10
Luis Vivenes (VEN)	0
Amar Dhesi (CAN)	6^{F}
Charles Merrill (PUR)	0

Final
Nick Gwiazdowski (USA)	WO
Amar Dhesi (CAN)
Bronze medal
Luis Vivenes (VEN)	2
Charles Merrill (PUR)	13

== Men's Greco-Roman ==
=== 60 kg ===
13 March

Round of 16
Andrés Montaño (ECU)	3
Ildar Hafizov (USA)	4
Adam MacFadyen (CAN)	0
Marat Garipov (BRA)	9
Emerson Felipe (GUA)	5
Samuel Gurria (MEX)	7

Quarterfinals
Dicther Toro (COL)	3
Luis Orta (CUB)	4
Gustavo Rodríguez (VEN)	5
Joshua Medina (PUR)	1
Ildar Hafizov (USA)	9
Marat Garipov (BRA)	0
Samuel Gurria (MEX)	6^{F}
Jancel Pimentel (DOM)	5

Semifinals
Luis Orta (CUB)	5
Gustavo Rodríguez (VEN)	2
Ildar Hafizov (USA)	7
Samuel Gurria (MEX)	2

Final
Luis Orta (CUB)	7
Ildar Hafizov (USA)	0

Repechage round 1
Andrés Montaño (ECU)	11
Marat Garipov (BRA)	3

Bronze medals
Dicther Toro (COL)	12
Gustavo Rodríguez (VEN)	6
Andrés Montaño (ECU)	9
Samuel Gurria (MEX)	7

=== 67 kg ===
13 March

Round of 16
Germán Díaz (PUR)	1
Manuel López (MEX)	10
Daniel Coles (CAN)	7
Nilton Soto (PER)	1
Enyer Feliciano (DOM)	9
Cristóbal Torres (CHI)	3

Quarterfinals
Anthony Palencia (VEN)	3
Joílson Júnior (BRA)	5
Julián Horta (COL)	6
Cristhian Rivas (ECU)	3
Manuel López (MEX)	10
Daniel Coles (CAN)	2
Enyer Feliciano (DOM)	1
Alejandro Sancho (USA)	7

Semifinals
Joílson Júnior (BRA)	0
Julián Horta (COL)	9
Manuel López (MEX)	1
Alejandro Sancho (USA)	8

Final
Julián Horta (COL)	4
Alejandro Sancho (USA)	0

Bronze medals
Cristhian Rivas (ECU)	0
Joílson Júnior (BRA)	9
Enyer Feliciano (DOM)	4
Manuel López (MEX)	2^{F}

=== 77 kg ===
13 March

Quarterfinals		Semifinals		Final
Wuileixis Rivas (VEN)	1
José Andrés Vargas (MEX)	4	José Andrés Vargas (MEX)	3
Ângelo Moreira (BRA)	3	Marciano Ali (PUR)	2
Marciano Ali (PUR)	8			José Andrés Vargas (MEX)	0
John Yeats (CAN)	0			Yosvanys Peña (CUB)	8
Pat Smith (USA)	8	Pat Smith (USA)	1
Jair Cuero (COL)	2	Yosvanys Peña (CUB)	6
Yosvanys Peña (CUB)	2

Bronze medals
Wuileixis Rivas (VEN)
Marciano Ali (PUR)	WO
Jair Cuero (COL)	2
Pat Smith (USA)	3

=== 87 kg ===
13 March

Round of 16
Carlos Adames (DOM)	11
Ioannis Narlidis (CAN)	2
Luis Avendaño (VEN)	5
Carlos Muñoz (COL)	1

Quarterfinals
Daniel Grégorich (CUB)	8
Daniel Vicente (MEX)	0
Ariel Alfonso (HON)	2^{F}
Ronisson Brandão (BRA)	1
Lesyan Cousin (JAM)	8
Carlos Adames (DOM)	0
Luis Avendaño (VEN)	4
Joe Rau (USA)	4

Semifinals
Daniel Grégorich (CUB)	6
Ariel Alfonso (HON)	0
Lesyan Cousin (JAM)	1
Joe Rau (USA)	9

Final
Daniel Grégorich (CUB)
Joe Rau (USA)	WO

Bronze medals
Daniel Vicente (MEX)	2
Ariel Alfonso (HON)	6
Luis Avendaño (VEN)	6
Lesyan Cousin (JAM)	1

=== 97 kg ===
13 March

Pos	Athlete	Pld	W	L	CP	TP	USA	VEN	MEX	CAN
1	G'Angelo Hancock (USA)	3	3	0	12	26	—	9–0	8–0	9–0
2	Luillys Pérez (VEN)	3	2	1	8	18	0–4 SU	—	9–0	9–0
3	Luis Rivera (MEX)	3	1	2	3	1	0–4 SU	0–4 SU	—	1–1
4	Thomas Barreiro (CAN)	3	0	3	1	1	0–4 SU	0–4 SU	1–3 PO1	—

Source: UWW

Pos	Athlete	Pld	W	L	CP	TP	CUB	HON	BRA
1	Gabriel Rosillo (CUB)	2	2	0	8	6	—	2–1	4–0 Fall
2	Kevin Mejía (HON)	2	1	1	5	10	1–3 PO1	—	9–0
3	Guilherme Evangelista (BRA)	2	0	2	0	0	0–5 FA	0–4 SU	—

Source: UWW

Semifinals
Gabriel Rosillo (CUB)	8
Luillys Pérez (VEN)	0
G'Angelo Hancock (USA)	9
Kevin Mejía (HON)	0

Final
Gabriel Rosillo (CUB)	11
G'Angelo Hancock (USA)	8
Bronze medal
Luillys Pérez (VEN)	WO
Kevin Mejía (HON)

=== 130 kg ===
13 March

Quarterfinals		Semifinals		Final
Moisés Pérez (VEN)	8
Luciano del Río (ARG)	0	Moisés Pérez (VEN)	3
Luis Alberto Román (MEX)	0	Eduard Soghomonyan (BRA)	8^{F}
Eduard Soghomonyan (BRA)	9			Eduard Soghomonyan (BRA)	0
Brad Hildenbrandt (CAN)	0			Yasmani Acosta (CHI)	9
Leo Santana (DOM)	8	Leo Santana (DOM)	0
Yasmani Acosta (CHI)	3	Yasmani Acosta (CHI)	9
Adam Coon (USA)	2

Bronze medals
Luis Alberto Román (MEX)	0
Moisés Pérez (VEN)	9
Adam Coon (USA)	8
Leo Santana (DOM)	1^{R}

== Women's freestyle ==
=== 50 kg ===
14 March

Round of 16
Kamila Barbosa (BRA)	12
Génesis Milano (VEN)	1
Rita Rojas (MEX)	2^{F}
Jacqueline Mollocana (ECU)	1

Quarterfinals
Carolina Castillo (COL)	3
Patricia Bermúdez (ARG)	0
Thalía Mallqui (PER)	0
Yusneylys Guzmán (CUB)	11
Jessica MacDonald (CAN)	10
Kamila Barbosa (BRA)	0
Rita Rojas (MEX)	0
Sarah Hildebrandt (USA)	10

Semifinals
Carolina Castillo (COL)	4
Yusneylys Guzmán (CUB)	6
Jessica MacDonald (CAN)	0
Sarah Hildebrandt (USA)	11

Final
Yusneylys Guzmán (CUB)	WO
Sarah Hildebrandt (USA)

Bronze medals
Thalía Mallqui (PER)	WO
Carolina Castillo (COL)
Rita Rojas (MEX)	0
Jessica MacDonald (CAN)	10

=== 53 kg ===
14 March

Pos	Athlete	Pld	W	L	CP	TP	ECU	CAN	PUR
1	Luisa Valverde (ECU)	2	2	0	7	14	—	4–0	10–0
2	Samantha Stewart (CAN)	2	1	1	5	5	0–3 PO	—	5–2 Fall
3	Gabriela Ramos (PUR)	2	0	2	0	2	0–4 SU	0–5 FA	—

Source: UWW

Pos	Athlete	Pld	W	L	CP	TP	USA	CUB	MEX
1	Jacarra Winchester (USA)	2	2	0	7	16	—	6–2	10–0
2	Lianna Montero (CUB)	2	1	1	4	8	1–3 PO1	—	6–0
3	Zeltzin Hernández (MEX)	2	0	2	0	0	0–4 SU	0–3 PO	—

Source: UWW

Semifinals
Luisa Valverde (ECU)	4
Lianna Montero (CUB)	5
Jacarra Winchester (USA)	8
Samantha Stewart (CAN)	4

Final
Lianna Montero (CUB)	WO
Jacarra Winchester (USA)
Bronze medal
Luisa Valverde (ECU)	0
Samantha Stewart (CAN)	9

=== 57 kg ===
14 March

Pos	Athlete	Pld	W	L	CP	TP	USA	CAN	BRA	ECU
1	Helen Maroulis (USA)	3	3	0	9	25	—	10–2	9–0	6–2
2	Linda Morais (CAN)	3	2	1	8	21	1–3 PO1	—	10–0	9–3
3	Giullia Penalber (BRA)	3	1	2	3	9	0–3 PO	0–4 SU	—	9–3
4	Lissette Antes (ECU)	3	0	3	3	8	1–3 PO1	1–3 PO1	1–3 PO1	—

Source: UWW

Pos	Athlete	Pld	W	L	CP	TP	MEX	PUR	VEN
1	Alma Valencia (MEX)	2	2	0	8	14	—	9–2 Fall	5–1
2	Nes Marie Rodríguez (PUR)	2	1	1	3	5	0–5 FA	—	3–2
3	Betzabeth Sarco (VEN)	2	0	2	2	3	1–3 PO1	1–3 PO1	—

Source: UWW

Semifinals
Helen Maroulis (USA)	11
Nes Marie Rodríguez (PUR)	0
Alma Valencia (MEX)	8^{F}
Linda Morais (CAN)	2

Final
Helen Maroulis (USA)
Alma Valencia (MEX)	WO
Bronze medal
Nes Marie Rodríguez (PUR)	0
Linda Morais (CAN)	5^{F}

=== 62 kg ===
14 March

Pos	Athlete	Pld	W	L	CP	TP	USA	VEN	MEX	COL
1	Kayla Miracle (USA)	3	3	0	12	22	—	6–0 Fall	5–1	11–0
2	Nathaly Grimán (VEN)	3	2	1	6	11	0–5 FA	—	3–2	8–4
3	Alejandra Romero (MEX)	3	1	2	5	6	1–3 PO1	1–3 PO1	—	3–2
4	Jackeline Rentería (COL)	3	0	3	2	6	0–4 SU	1–3 PO1	1–3 PO1	—

Source: UWW

Pos	Athlete	Pld	W	L	CP	TP	BRA	CAN	DOM
1	Laís Nunes (BRA)	2	2	0	6	15	—	6–1	9–3
2	Michelle Fazzari (CAN)	2	1	1	4	11	1–3 PO1	—	10–1
3	Yessica Oviedo (DOM)	2	0	2	2	4	1–3 PO1	1–3 PO1	—

Source: UWW

Semifinals
Laís Nunes (BRA)	3
Nathaly Grimán (VEN)	1
Kayla Miracle (USA)	12
Michelle Fazzari (CAN)	3

Final
Laís Nunes (BRA)	WO
Kayla Miracle (USA)
Bronze medal
Nathaly Grimán (VEN)
Michelle Fazzari (CAN)	WO

=== 68 kg ===
14 March

Round of 16
Tatiana Rentería (COL)	3^{F}
María Acosta (VEN)	1

Quarterfinals
Danielle Lappage (CAN)	10
Luz Vázquez (ARG)	0
Leonela Ayoví (ECU)	3^{F}
Dailane Reis (BRA)	6
Virginia Fernández (MEX)	2
Yanet Sovero (PER)	4
Tatiana Rentería (COL)	0
Yudaris Sánchez (CUB)	4^{F}

Semifinals
Danielle Lappage (CAN)	10
Leonela Ayoví (ECU)	0
Yanet Sovero (PER)	0
Yudaris Sánchez (CUB)	5

Final
Danielle Lappage (CAN)	WO
Yudaris Sánchez (CUB)

Bronze medals
Luz Vázquez (ARG)	3
Leonela Ayoví (ECU)	2
Tatiana Rentería (COL)	4
Yanet Sovero (PER)	2

=== 76 kg ===
14 March

Pos	Athlete	Pld	W	L	CP	TP	CAN	BRA	CUB	VEN
1	Erica Wiebe (CAN)	3	3	0	11	12	—	2–1	4–0	6–0 Fall
2	Aline Ferreira (BRA)	3	2	1	9	9	1–3 PO1	—	4–2	4–0 Fall
3	Milaimys Marín (CUB)	3	1	2	6	8	0–3 PO	1–3 PO1	—	6–0 Fall
4	Andrimar Lázaro (VEN)	3	0	3	0	0	0–5 FA	0–5 FA	0–5 FA	—

Source: UWW

Pos	Athlete	Pld	W	L	CP	TP	COL	ECU	MEX
1	Andrea Olaya (COL)	2	2	0	7	14	—	4–1	10–0
2	Génesis Reasco (ECU)	2	1	1	5	11	1–3 PO1	—	10–0
3	Gabriela Canales (MEX)	2	0	2	0	0	0–4 SU	0–4 SU	—

Source: UWW

Semifinals
Andrea Olaya (COL)	1
Aline Ferreira (BRA)	2
Erica Wiebe (CAN)	6
Génesis Reasco (ECU)	0

Final
Aline Ferreira (BRA)
Erica Wiebe (CAN)	WO
Bronze medal
Andrea Olaya (COL)
Génesis Reasco (ECU)	WO

== See also ==
- 2021 European Wrestling Olympic Qualification Tournament
- 2021 African & Oceania Wrestling Olympic Qualification Tournament
- 2021 Asian Wrestling Olympic Qualification Tournament
- 2021 World Wrestling Olympic Qualification Tournament
- 2020 U.S. Olympic Team Trials (wrestling)
