= Wrestling at the 2018 Central American and Caribbean Games =

Wrestling competition held in Barranquilla, Colombia

- Venue: Coliseo Universidad del Atlántico
- Location: (Colombia) Barranquilla
- Dates: 29 July – 2 August

The wrestling competition at the 2018 Central American and Caribbean Games was held in Barranquilla, Colombia from 29 July to 2 August at the Coliseo Universidad del Atlántico.

== Medal summary ==
=== Men's freestyle ===
| Event | Gold | Silver | Bronze |
|---|---|---|---|
| 57 kg | Reineri Andreu; Cuba | Juan Ramírez; Dominican Republic | Pedro Mejías; Venezuela Óscar Tigreros; Colombia |
| 65 kg | Alejandro Valdés; Cuba | Úber Cuero; Colombia | Anthony Montero; Venezuela Álbaro Rudesindo; Dominican Republic |
| 74 kg | Franklin Marén; Cuba | Franklin Gómez; Puerto Rico | Luis Barrios; Honduras Néstor Tafur; Colombia |
| 86 kg | Yurieski Torreblanca; Cuba | Carlos Izquierdo; Colombia | Gino Ávila; Honduras Pedro Ceballo; Venezuela |
| 97 kg | Reineris Salas; Cuba | Charles Merrill; Puerto Rico | José Daniel Díaz; Venezuela Miguel Sánchez; Mexico |
| 125 kg | Yudenny Alpajón; Cuba | Luis Vivenes; Venezuela | Marcos Santos; Puerto Rico |

=== Men's Greco-Roman ===
| Event | Gold | Silver | Bronze |
|---|---|---|---|
| 60 kg | Luis Orta; Cuba | Emilio Pérez; Mexico | Anthony Palencia; Venezuela |
| 67 kg | Ismael Borrero; Cuba | Manuel López; Mexico | Luis de León; Dominican Republic Juan Carlos López; Colombia |
| 77 kg | Ariel Fis; Cuba | Luis Avendaño; Venezuela | Jaír Cuero; Colombia |
| 87 kg | Daniel Grégorich; Cuba | Yorgen Cova; Venezuela | Carlos Muñoz; Colombia |
| 97 kg | Luillys Pérez; Venezuela | Kevin Mejía; Honduras | José Arias; Dominican Republic Yasmany Lugo; Cuba |
| 130 kg | Mijaín López; Cuba | Leo Santana; Dominican Republic | Moisés Pérez; Venezuela Luis Román; Mexico |

=== Women's freestyle ===
| Event | Gold | Silver | Bronze |
|---|---|---|---|
| 50 kg | Carolina Castillo; Colombia | Mariana Díaz Muñoz; Mexico | Yusneylys Guzmán; Cuba Anny Ramírez; Dominican Republic |
| 53 kg | Betzabeth Arguello; Venezuela | Lilianet Duanes; Cuba | Rita Rojas; Mexico |
| 57 kg | Lianna Montero; Cuba | Nes Marie Rodríguez; Puerto Rico | Yessica Oviedo; Dominican Republic |
| 62 kg | Nathaly Grimán; Venezuela | Yakelin Estornell; Cuba | Jackeline Rentería; Colombia |
| 68 kg | Yudari Sánchez; Cuba | Soleymi Caraballo; Venezuela | Saidy Chávez; Honduras |
| 76 kg | Andrea Olaya; Colombia | María Acosta; Venezuela | Mabelkis Capote; Cuba |

== Medal table ==
* Host nation (Host)

| Rank | Nation | Gold | Silver | Bronze | Total |
|---|---|---|---|---|---|
| 1 | Cuba (CUB) | 13 | 2 | 3 | 18 |
| 2 | Venezuela (VEN) | 3 | 5 | 6 | 14 |
| 3 | Colombia (COL)* | 2 | 2 | 6 | 10 |
| 4 | Mexico (MEX) | 0 | 3 | 3 | 6 |
| 5 | Puerto Rico (PUR) | 0 | 3 | 1 | 4 |
| 6 | Dominican Republic (DOM) | 0 | 2 | 5 | 7 |
| 7 | Honduras (HON) | 0 | 1 | 3 | 4 |
| Totals (7 entries) | | 18 | 18 | 27 | 63 |
