= Lianna Montero =

Cuban freestyle wrestler

Personal information
- Full name: Lianna de la Caridad Montero Herrera
- Born: 21 January 1998 (age 28)
- Height: 153 cm (5 ft 0 in)

Sport
- Country: Cuba
- Sport: Amateur wrestling
- Event: Freestyle
Medal record
Women's freestyle wrestling
Representing Cuba
World Championships
Bronze medal – third place	2018 Budapest	55 kg
Pan American Games
Bronze medal – third place	2019 Lima	53 kg
Central American and Caribbean Games
Gold medal – first place	2018 Barranquilla	57 kg
Pan American Championships
Silver medal – second place	2018 Lima	57 kg
Bronze medal – third place	2020 Ottawa	53 kg
Golden Grand Prix Ivan Yarygin
Bronze medal – third place	2018 Krasnoyarsk	57 kg

Lianna de la Caridad Montero Herrera (born 21 January 1998) is a Cuban freestyle wrestler. She is a bronze medalist at the World Wrestling Championships and the Pan American Games. She also won the gold medal in her event at the 2018 Central American and Caribbean Games held in Barranquilla, Colombia.

== Career ==
In 2016, Montero competed in the women's 53 kg event at the 2016 Pan American Wrestling Olympic Qualification Tournament without qualifying for the 2016 Summer Olympics in Rio de Janeiro, Brazil. She won her first match against Giullia Penalber of Brazil but she lost her next match against Betzabeth Argüello of Venezuela. Montero went on to win one of the bronze medals in the competition.

In 2018, Montero won the silver medal in the 57 kg event at the 2018 Pan American Wrestling Championships held in Lima, Peru. At the 2018 Central American and Caribbean Games held in Barranquilla, Colombia, she defeated Nes Marie Rodríguez of Puerto Rico in the final and she won the gold medal in the 57 kg event. Later that year, she also won one of the bronze medals in the 55 kg event at the 2018 World Wrestling Championships held in Budapest, Hungary. In her bronze medal match she defeated Jacarra Winchester of the United States.

In 2019, Montero represented Cuba at the 2019 Pan American Games in Lima, Peru and she won one of the bronze medals in the 53 kg event. She also competed in the 53 kg event at the 2019 World Wrestling Championships in Nur-Sultan, Kazakhstan without winning a medal. She was eliminated in the repechage by Roksana Zasina of Poland. In 2020, she won one of the bronze medals in the 53 kg event at the 2020 Pan American Wrestling Championships held in Ottawa, Canada.

In March 2020, Montero qualified to represent Cuba at the 2020 Summer Olympics at the 2020 Pan American Wrestling Olympic Qualification Tournament held in Ottawa, Canada. However, she did not compete and Laura Hérin competed in the women's 53 kg event instead.

== Achievements ==
Year	Tournament	Location	Result	Event
2018	Pan American Wrestling Championships	Lima, Peru	2nd	Freestyle 57 kg
2018	Central American and Caribbean Games	Barranquilla, Colombia	1st	Freestyle 57 kg
2018	World Wrestling Championships	Budapest, Hungary	3rd	Freestyle 55 kg
2019	Pan American Games	Lima, Peru	3rd	Freestyle 53 kg
2020	Pan American Wrestling Championships	Ottawa, Canada	3rd	Freestyle 53 kg
