= 2020 Pan American Wrestling Championships =

2020 Pan American Championship
- Host city: Ottawa, Ontario, Canada
- Dates: 6–9 March
- Stadium: Shaw Centre (Ottawa)

Champions
- Freestyle: United States
- Greco-Roman: United States
- Women: United States

The 2020 Pan American Wrestling Championships was held in Ottawa, Canada, from 6 to 9 March 2020.

== Team ranking ==
Rank	Men's freestyle		Men's Greco-Roman		Women's freestyle	
Rank	Team	Points	Team	Points	Team	Points
1	United States	205	United States	200	United States	152
2	Canada	120	Cuba	105	Canada	141
3	Cuba	100	Venezuela	69	Brazil	103
4	Venezuela	66	Mexico	68	Ecuador	66
5	Mexico	59	Colombia	67	Venezuela	62
6	Puerto Rico	57	Brazil	65	Cuba	53
7	Dominican Republic	44	Canada	55	Colombia	51
8	Peru	35	Dominican Republic	42	Mexico	46
9	Argentina	35	Puerto Rico	29	Peru	35
10	Brazil	30	Honduras	18	Puerto Rico	20

== Medal table ==
* Host nation (Canada)

Rank	Nation	Gold	Silver	Bronze	Total
1	United States (USA)	15	5	4	24
2	Cuba (CUB)	5	3	3	11
3	Canada (CAN)*	2	6	5	13
4	Brazil (BRA)	1	2	4	7
5	Colombia (COL)	1	2	1	4
6	Ecuador (ECU)	1	1	1	3
6	Peru (PER)	1	1	1	3
8	Jamaica (JAM)	1	0	1	2
9	Mexico (MEX)	0	3	1	4
10	Puerto Rico (PUR)	0	2	1	3
11	Venezuela (VEN)	0	1	6	7
12	Costa Rica (CRC)	0	1	0	1
13	Dominican Republic (DOM)	0	0	4	4
14	Argentina (ARG)	0	0	1	1
14	Chile (CHI)	0	0	1	1
14	Guatemala (GUA)	0	0	1	1
14	Honduras (HON)	0	0	1	1
Totals (17 entries)		27	27	36	90

== Medalists ==
=== Men's freestyle ===
Event	Gold	Silver	Bronze
57 kg	Reineri Andreu; Cuba	Pedro Mejías; Venezuela	Darian Cruz; United States
57 kg	Reineri Andreu; Cuba	Pedro Mejías; Venezuela	Juan Rubelín Ramírez; Dominican Republic
61 kg	Tyler Graff; United States	Scott Schiller; Canada	Not awarded as there were only 2 competitors.
65 kg	Yianni Diakomihalis; United States	Mauricio Sánchez; Ecuador	Sixto Auccapiña; Peru
65 kg	Yianni Diakomihalis; United States	Mauricio Sánchez; Ecuador	Agustín Destribats; Argentina
70 kg	Anthony Ashnault; United States	Brandon Díaz; Mexico	Cruiz Manning; Canada
74 kg	Jordan Burroughs; United States	Franklin Gómez; Puerto Rico	Anthony Montero; Venezuela
74 kg	Jordan Burroughs; United States	Franklin Gómez; Puerto Rico	Geandry Garzón; Cuba
79 kg	Jason Nolf; United States	Guseyn Ruslanzada; Canada	Victor Hernández; Mexico
86 kg	Yurieski Torreblanca; Cuba	Pool Ambrocio; Peru	Clayton Pye; Canada
86 kg	Yurieski Torreblanca; Cuba	Pool Ambrocio; Peru	Alex Dieringer; United States
92 kg	Maxwell Lacey; Costa Rica	—	Not awarded as there were only 2 competitors.
97 kg	Kyle Snyder; United States	Reineris Salas; Cuba	Luis Miguel Pérez; Dominican Republic
125 kg	Anthony Nelson; United States	Amar Dhesi; Canada	Óscar Pino; Cuba

=== Men's Greco-Roman ===
Event	Gold	Silver	Bronze
55 kg	Max Nowry; United States	Kieran Akhtar; Canada	—
60 kg	Dicther Toro; Colombia	Leslie Fuenffinger; United States	Emerson Felipe; Guatemala
60 kg	Dicther Toro; Colombia	Leslie Fuenffinger; United States	Jancel Pimentel; Dominican Republic
63 kg	no competitors		
67 kg	Ismael Borrero; Cuba	Diego Martínez; Mexico	Alejandro Sancho; United States
67 kg	Ismael Borrero; Cuba	Diego Martínez; Mexico	Cristóbal Torres; Chile
72 kg	Raymond Bunker; United States	Joílson Júnior; Brazil	Not awarded as there were only 2 competitors.
77 kg	Yosvanys Peña; Cuba	Pat Smith; United States	Wuileixis Rivas; Venezuela
82 kg	John Stefanowicz; United States	José Andrés Vargas; Mexico	Marciano Ali; Puerto Rico
87 kg	Joe Rau; United States	Carlos Muñoz; Colombia	Lesyan Cousin; Jamaica
87 kg	Joe Rau; United States	Carlos Muñoz; Colombia	Ronisson Brandão; Brazil
97 kg	G'Angelo Hancock; United States	Gabriel Rosillo; Cuba	Luillys Pérez; Venezuela
97 kg	G'Angelo Hancock; United States	Gabriel Rosillo; Cuba	Kevin Mejía; Honduras
130 kg	Ángel Pacheco; Cuba	Adam Coon; United States	Moisés Pérez; Venezuela
130 kg	Ángel Pacheco; Cuba	Adam Coon; United States	Leo Santana; Dominican Republic

=== Women's freestyle ===
Event	Gold	Silver	Bronze
50 kg	Victoria Anthony; United States	Carolina Castillo; Colombia	Kamila Barbosa; Brazil
50 kg	Victoria Anthony; United States	Carolina Castillo; Colombia	Jacqueline Mollocana; Ecuador
53 kg	Luisa Valverde; Ecuador	Jade Parsons; Canada	Lianna Montero; Cuba
55 kg	no competitors		
57 kg	Giullia Penalber; Brazil	Hannah Taylor; Canada	Betzabeth Sarco; Venezuela
59 kg	Alexandria Town; Canada	Nes Marie Rodríguez; Puerto Rico	Lauren Louive; United States
62 kg	Mallory Velte; United States	Laís Nunes; Brazil	Jessica Brouillette; Canada
65 kg	no competitors		
68 kg	Tamyra Mensah; United States	Yudaris Sánchez; Cuba	María Acosta; Venezuela
68 kg	Tamyra Mensah; United States	Yudaris Sánchez; Cuba	Olivia Di Bacco; Canada
72 kg	Yanet Sovero; Peru	Victoria Francis; United States	Shauna Kuebeck; Canada
76 kg	Justina Di Stasio; Canada	Adeline Gray; United States	Aline Ferreira; Brazil
76 kg	Justina Di Stasio; Canada	Adeline Gray; United States	Andrea Olaya; Colombia

== Participating nations ==
178 wrestlers from 18 countries:

1. Argentina (6)
2. Barbados (2)
3. Brazil (16)
4. Canada (24)
5. Chile (3)
6. Colombia (12)
7. Costa Rica (1)
8. Cuba (15)
9. Dominican Republic (9)
10. Ecuador (7)
11. Guatemala (3)
12. Honduras (3)
13. Jamaica (2)
14. Mexico (18) (Host)
15. Peru (5)
16. Puerto Rico (9)
17. United States (26)
18. Venezuela (17)

== Results ==
Legend

- C — Won by 3 cautions given to the opponent
- F — Won by fall
- R — Retired
- WO — Won by walkover

=== Men's freestyle ===
==== Men's freestyle 57 kg ====
9 March

Round of 16
Juan Rubelín Ramírez (DOM)	11
Jesús Garfias (MEX)	0

Quarterfinals
Reineri Andreu (CUB)	12
Darian Cruz (USA)	2
Edwin Segura (GUA)	2^{F}
Óscar Tigreros (COL)	8
Pedro Mejías (VEN)	6
Ligrit Sadiku (CAN)	1
Bryan Oliveira (BRA)	1
Juan Rubelín Ramírez (DOM)	12

Semifinals
Reineri Andreu (CUB)	10
Edwin Segura (GUA)	0
Pedro Mejías (VEN)	4
Juan Rubelín Ramírez (DOM)	3

Final
Reineri Andreu (CUB)	4
Pedro Mejías (VEN)	2

Bronze medal match
Darian Cruz (USA)	10
Edwin Segura (GUA)	0
Ligrit Sadiku (CAN)
Juan Rubelín Ramírez (DOM)	WO

==== Men's freestyle 61 kg ====
9 March

Pos	Athlete	Pld	W	L	CP	TP	USA	CAN
1	Tyler Graff (USA)	1	1	0	4	11	—	11–0
2	Scott Schiller (CAN)	1	0	1	0	0	0–4 SU	—

Source: UWW

==== Men's freestyle 65 kg ====
9 March

Round of 16
Úber Cuero (COL)	2
Agustín Destribats (ARG)	7
José Javier Rodríguez (PUR)	11
Álbaro Rudesindo (DOM)	5
Luis Orta (CUB)
Yianni Diakomihalis (USA)	WO

Quarterfinals
Mauricio Sánchez (ECU)	6
David Moreira (BRA)	0
Wilfredo Rodríguez (VEN)	3
Sixto Auccapiña (PER)	4
Vincent De Marinis (CAN)	2
Agustín Destribats (ARG)	11
José Javier Rodríguez (PUR)	2
Yianni Diakomihalis (USA)	9

Semifinals
Mauricio Sánchez (ECU)	7
Sixto Auccapiña (PER)	4
Agustín Destribats (ARG)	4
Yianni Diakomihalis (USA)	7

Final
Mauricio Sánchez (ECU)	0
Yianni Diakomihalis (USA)	4^{F}

Repechage round 1
Luis Orta (CUB)
José Javier Rodríguez (PUR)	WO

Bronze medal match
David Moreira (BRA)	0
Sixto Auccapiña (PER)	9
José Javier Rodríguez (PUR)	0
Agustín Destribats (ARG)	10

==== Men's freestyle 70 kg ====
9 March

Pos	Athlete	Pld	W	L	CP	TP	USA	MEX	CAN	BRA	BAR
1	Anthony Ashnault (USA)	4	4	0	19	27	—	5–0 Fall	12–2	6–0 Fall	4–0 Fall
2	Brandon Díaz (MEX)	4	3	1	13	11	0–5 FA	—	3–1	4–0 Fall	4–0 Fall
3	Cruiz Manning (CAN)	4	2	2	11	23	1–4 SU1	1–3 PO1	—	10–0	10–0 Fall
4	Hugo Viana (BRA)	4	1	3	4	10	0–5 FA	0–5 FA	0–4 SU	—	10–0
5	Ranico Howard (BAR)	4	0	4	0	0	0–5 FA	0–5 FA	0–5 FA	0–4 SU	—

Source: UWW

==== Men's freestyle 74 kg ====
9 March

Round of 16
Julio Rodríguez (DOM)	4
Jasmit Phulka (CAN)	5
Néstor Tafur (COL)	4
Geandry Garzón (CUB)	15

Quarterfinals
Anthony Montero (VEN)	5
León Peralta (CHI)	3
Franklin Gómez (PUR)	10
Enrique Pérez (GUA)	0
Jorge Llano (ARG)	0
Jordan Burroughs (USA)	10
Jasmit Phulka (CAN)	0
Geandry Garzón (CUB)	3

Semifinals
Anthony Montero (VEN)	0
Franklin Gómez (PUR)	7
Jordan Burroughs (USA)	3
Geandry Garzón (CUB)	0

Final
Franklin Gómez (PUR)	1
Jordan Burroughs (USA)	8

Bronze medal match
Enrique Pérez (GUA)	2
Anthony Montero (VEN)	12
Jorge Llano (ARG)	0
Geandry Garzón (CUB)	11

==== Men's freestyle 79 kg ====
8 March

Pos	Athlete	Pld	W	L	CP	TP	USA	CAN	MEX
1	Jason Nolf (USA)	2	2	0	9	10	—	10–0	WO
2	Guseyn Ruslanzada (CAN)	2	1	1	3	6	0–4 SU	—	6–6
3	Victor Hernández (MEX)	2	0	2	1	6	0–5 IN	1–3 PO1	—

Source: UWW

==== Men's freestyle 86 kg ====
9 March

Round of 16
Gino Ávila (HON)	0
Carlos Izquierdo (COL)	5^{F}
Ethan Ramos (PUR)	10
Noel Torres (MEX)	0
Alex Dieringer (USA)	6^{F}
Pedro Ceballos (VEN)	0

Quarterfinals
Clayton Pye (CAN)	6^{F}
Reuben Wiltshire (BAR)	0
Pool Ambrocio (PER)	7
Ricardo Báez (ARG)	1
Yurieski Torreblanca (CUB)	11
Carlos Izquierdo (COL)	1
Ethan Ramos (PUR)	2
Alex Dieringer (USA)	9

Semifinals
Clayton Pye (CAN)	2
Pool Ambrocio (PER)	7
Yurieski Torreblanca (CUB)	2
Alex Dieringer (USA)	1

Final
Pool Ambrocio (PER)	0^{R}
Yurieski Torreblanca (CUB)	6

Bronze medal match
Ricardo Báez (ARG)	3
Clayton Pye (CAN)	4
Carlos Izquierdo (COL)	1
Alex Dieringer (USA)	11

==== Men's freestyle 92 kg ====
8 March

Pos	Athlete	Pld	W	L	CP	TP	JAM	CRC
—	Angus Arthur (JAM)	1	1	0	5	4	—	13–1
2	Maxwell Lacey (CRC)	1	0	1	0	0	1–4 SU1	—

Source: UWW

==== Men's freestyle 97 kg ====
9 March

Pos	Athlete	Pld	W	L	CP	TP	CUB	VEN	CAN	MEX
1	Reineris Salas (CUB)	3	3	0	11	15	—	3–1	4–0	8–0 Fall
2	José Daniel Díaz (VEN)	3	2	1	8	15	1–3 PO1	—	4–4	10–0
3	Nishan Randhawa (CAN)	3	1	2	6	14	0–3 PO	1–3 PO1	—	10–0 Fall
4	Esdras López (MEX)	3	0	3	0	0	0–5 FA	0–4 SU	0–5 FA	—

Source: UWW

Pos	Athlete	Pld	W	L	CP	TP	USA	DOM	PUR
1	Kyle Snyder (USA)	2	2	0	8	26	—	14–4	12–2
2	Luis Miguel Pérez (DOM)	2	1	1	5	16	1–4 SU1	—	12–2
3	Evan Ramos (PUR)	2	0	2	2	4	1–4 SU1	1–4 SU1	—

Source: UWW

Semifinals
Reineris Salas (CUB)	2
Luis Miguel Pérez (DOM)	1
Kyle Snyder (USA)	9
José Daniel Díaz (VEN)	1

Final
Reineris Salas (CUB)	1
Kyle Snyder (USA)	11
Bronze medal
Luis Miguel Pérez (DOM)	5
José Daniel Díaz (VEN)	3

==== Men's freestyle 125 kg ====
9 March

Pos	Athlete	Pld	W	L	CP	TP	CAN	MEX	VEN
1	Amar Dhesi (CAN)	2	2	0	9	14	—	4–0 Fall	10–0
2	Christian Anguiano (MEX)	2	1	1	4	10	0–5 FA	—	10–0
3	Luis Vivenes (VEN)	2	0	2	0	0	0–4 SU	0–4 SU	—

Source: UWW

Pos	Athlete	Pld	W	L	CP	TP	USA	CUB	PUR
1	Anthony Nelson (USA)	2	2	0	6	6	—	2–2	4–0
2	Óscar Pino (CUB)	2	1	1	5	12	1–3 PO1	—	10–0
3	Charles Merrill (PUR)	2	0	2	0	0	0–3 PO	0–4 SU	—

Source: UWW

Semifinals
Amar Dhesi (CAN)	10^{F}
Óscar Pino (CUB)	7
Anthony Nelson (USA)	2^{F}
Christian Anguiano (MEX)	0

Final
Amar Dhesi (CAN)
Anthony Nelson (USA)	WO
Bronze medal
Óscar Pino (CUB)	10
Christian Anguiano (MEX)	0

=== Men's Greco-Roman ===
==== Men's Greco-Roman 55 kg ====
6 March

Pos	Athlete	Pld	W	L	CP	TP	USA	CAN	BRA
1	Max Nowry (USA)	2	2	0	9	10	—	10–0	WO
2	Kieran Akhtar (CAN)	2	1	1	5	0	0–4 SU	—	WO
—	Sargis Khachatryan (BRA)	2	0	2	0	0	0–5 FO	0–5 FO	—

Source: UWW

==== Men's Greco-Roman 60 kg ====
6 March

Round of 16
Adam MacFadyen (CAN)	0
Miguel Ugalde (MEX)	8

Quarterfinals
Dicther Toro (COL)	10
Emerson Felipe (GUA)	2
Marat Garipov (BRA)	6
Gustavo Rodríguez (VEN)	5
Jancel Pimentel (DOM)	12
Joshua Medina (PUR)	3
Leslie Fuenffinger (USA)	11
Miguel Ugalde (MEX)	0

Semifinals
Dicther Toro (COL)	9
Marat Garipov (BRA)	0
Jancel Pimentel (DOM)	1
Leslie Fuenffinger (USA)	3^{F}

Final
Dicther Toro (COL)	9
Leslie Fuenffinger (USA)	0

Bronze medal match
Emerson Felipe (GUA)	4
Marat Garipov (BRA)	3
Miguel Ugalde (MEX)	0
Jancel Pimentel (DOM)	9

==== Men's Greco-Roman 67 kg ====
6 March

Round of 16
Julián Horta (COL)	0
Ismael Borrero (CUB)	9
Germán Díaz (PUR)	4
Enyer Feliciano (DOM)	2
Alejandro Sancho (USA)	8
Joseph Dashou (CAN)	0

Quarterfinals
Cristhian Rivas (ECU)	3
Diego Martínez (MEX)	11
Nilton Soto (PER)	1
Cristóbal Torres (CHI)	6
Anthony Palencia (VEN)	0
Ismael Borrero (CUB)	8
Germán Díaz (PUR)	8
Alejandro Sancho (USA)	11

Semifinals
Diego Martínez (MEX)	12
Cristóbal Torres (CHI)	3
Ismael Borrero (CUB)	9
Alejandro Sancho (USA)	0

Final
Diego Martínez (MEX)	2
Ismael Borrero (CUB)	11

Repechage round 1
Julián Horta (COL)	6
Anthony Palencia (VEN)	5

Bronze medal match
Cristhian Rivas (ECU)	7
Cristóbal Torres (CHI)	2
Julián Horta (COL)	0
Alejandro Sancho (USA)	10

==== Men's Greco-Roman 72 kg ====
6 March

Pos	Athlete	Pld	W	L	CP	TP	USA	BRA
1	Raymond Bunker (USA)	1	1	0	3	3	—	3–2
2	Joílson Júnior (BRA)	1	0	1	1	2	1–3 PO1	—

Source: UWW

==== Men's Greco-Roman 77 kg ====
7 March

Pos	Athlete	Pld	W	L	CP	TP	VEN	COL	CAN
1	Wuileixis Rivas (VEN)	2	2	0	6	6	—	3–1	3–1
2	Jair Cuero (COL)	2	1	1	5	10	1–3 PO1	—	9–0
3	Brayden Ambo (CAN)	2	0	2	1	1	1–3 PO1	0–4 SU	—

Source: UWW

Pos	Athlete	Pld	W	L	CP	TP	USA	CUB	PUR
1	Pat Smith (USA)	2	2	0	7	15	—	3–1	12–3
2	Yosvanys Peña (CUB)	2	1	1	5	9	1–3 PO1	—	8–0
3	Ângelo Moreira (BRA)	2	0	2	1	3	1–4 SU1	0–4 SU	—

Source: UWW

Semifinals
Wuileixis Rivas (VEN)	0
Yosvanys Peña (CUB)	9
Pat Smith (USA)	4
Jair Cuero (COL)	4

Final
Yosvanys Peña (CUB)	3
Pat Smith (USA)	1
Bronze medal
Wuileixis Rivas (VEN)	6
Jair Cuero (COL)	1

==== Men's Greco-Roman 82 kg ====
7 March

Pos	Athlete	Pld	W	L	CP	TP	USA	MEX	PUR
1	John Stefanowicz (USA)	2	2	0	8	24	—	10–1	14–4
2	José Andrés Vargas (MEX)	2	1	1	5	9	1–4 SU1	—	8–3
3	Marciano Ali (PUR)	2	0	2	1	4	1–4 SU1	0–4 SU	—

Source: UWW

==== Men's Greco-Roman 87 kg ====
7 March

Round of 16
Alfonso Leyva (MEX)	0
Daniel Grégorich (CUB)	6
Ariel Alfonso (HON)	2
Carlos Adames (DOM)	10

Quarterfinals
Ioannis Narlidis (CAN)	1
Lesyan Cousin (JAM)	8
Joe Rau (USA)	8
Luis Avendaño (VEN)	0
Carlos Muñoz (COL)	3
Ronisson Brandão (BRA)	1
Daniel Grégorich (CUB)	WO
Carlos Adames (DOM)

Semifinals
Lesyan Cousin (JAM)	2
Joe Rau (USA)	11
Carlos Muñoz (COL)	7
Daniel Grégorich (CUB)	4

Final
Joe Rau (USA)	6
Carlos Muñoz (COL)	0

Bronze medal match
Luis Avendaño (VEN)
Lesyan Cousin (JAM)	WO
Ronisson Brandão (BRA)	WO
Daniel Grégorich (CUB)

==== Men's Greco-Roman 97 kg ====
6 March

Pos	Athlete	Pld	W	L	CP	TP	VEN	HON	BRA	CAN
1	Luillys Pérez (VEN)	3	3	0	12	12	—	3–1	9–0	WO
2	Kevin Mejía (HON)	3	2	1	10	9	1–3 PO1	—	8–0	WO
3	Guilherme Evangelista (BRA)	3	1	2	5	0	0–4 SU	0–4 SU	—	WO
4	Thomas Barreiro (CAN)	3	0	3	0	0	0–5 IN	0–5 IN	0–5 IN	—

Source: UWW

Pos	Athlete	Pld	W	L	CP	TP	CUB	USA	MEX
1	Gabriel Rosillo (CUB)	2	2	0	9	16	—	8–3 Fall	8–0
2	G'Angelo Hancock (USA)	2	1	1	4	12	0–5 FA	—	9–0
3	Edson Acuña (MEX)	2	0	2	0	0	0–4 SU	0–4 SU	—

Source: UWW

Semifinals
Luillys Pérez (VEN)	0
G'Angelo Hancock (USA)	3
Gabriel Rosillo (CUB)	10
Kevin Mejía (HON)	0

Final
G'Angelo Hancock (USA)	10
Gabriel Rosillo (CUB)	0
Bronze medal
Luillys Pérez (VEN)	WO
Kevin Mejía (HON)

==== Men's Greco-Roman 130 kg ====
6 March

Quarterfinals		Semifinals		Final
Moisés Pérez (VEN)	8
Charles Thoms (CAN)	0	Moisés Pérez (VEN)	1
~~Yasmani Acosta (CHI)~~		Adam Coon (USA)	9^{F}
Adam Coon (USA)	WO			Adam Coon (USA)	0
Ángel Pacheco (CUB)	8			Ángel Pacheco (CUB)	8
Leo Santana (DOM)	0	Ángel Pacheco (CUB)	8
Luis Alberto Román (MEX)	0	Luciano del Río (ARG)	0
Luciano del Río (ARG)	9

Bronze medals
~~Yasmani Acosta (CHI)~~
Moisés Pérez (VEN)	WO
Leo Santana (DOM)	3
Luciano del Río (ARG)	0

=== Women's freestyle ===
==== Women's freestyle 50 kg ====
8 March

Round of 16
Carolina Castillo (COL)	4
Madison Parks (CAN)	2
Yusneylys Guzmán (CUB)	3
Thalía Mallqui (PER)	4

Quarterfinals
Patricia Bermúdez (ARG)	2
Kamila Barbosa (BRA)	5
Victoria Anthony (USA)	10
Génesis Milano (VEN)	0
Mariana Díaz (MEX)	4
Jacqueline Mollocana (ECU)	8^{F}
Carolina Castillo (COL)	3
Thalía Mallqui (PER)	0

Semifinals
Kamila Barbosa (BRA)	0
Victoria Anthony (USA)	10
Jacqueline Mollocana (ECU)	1
Carolina Castillo (COL)	3

Final
Victoria Anthony (USA)	WO
Carolina Castillo (COL)

Repechage round 1
Madison Parks (CAN)
Thalía Mallqui (PER)	WO

Bronze medal match
Génesis Milano (VEN)	4
Kamila Barbosa (BRA)	7
Thalía Mallqui (PER)	1
Jacqueline Mollocana (ECU)	2

==== Women's freestyle 53 kg ====
8 March

Pos	Athlete	Pld	W	L	CP	TP	ECU	CAN	CUB	USA	MEX
1	Luisa Valverde (ECU)	4	4	0	17	36	—	10–0	4–0 Fall	12–2	10–0
2	Jade Parsons (CAN)	4	3	1	11	22	0–4 SU	—	4–6 Fall	10–0	8–4
3	Lianna Montero (CUB)	4	2	2	6	16	0–5 FA	0–5 FA	—	6–2	4–4
4	Haley Augello (USA)	4	1	3	6	16	1–4 SU1	0–4 SU	1–3 PO1	—	12–1
5	Zeltzin Hernández (MEX)	4	0	4	3	9	0–4 SU	1–3 PO1	1–3 PO1	1–4 SU1	—

Source: UWW

==== Women's freestyle 57 kg ====
8 March

Pos	Athlete	Pld	W	L	CP	TP	BRA	CAN	USA
1	Giullia Penalber (BRA)	2	1	1	6	4	—	2–2 Fall	2–2
2	Hannah Taylor (CAN)	2	1	1	3	0	0–5 FA	—	3–0
3	Kelsey Campbell (USA)	2	1	1	3	2	3–1 PO1	0–3 PO	—

Source: UWW

Pos	Athlete	Pld	W	L	CP	TP	ECU	VEN	MEX
1	Lissette Antes (ECU)	2	2	0	8	15	—	8–0 Fall	7–3
2	Betzabeth Sarco (VEN)	2	1	1	3	6	0–5 FA	—	6–5
3	Brenda Fernández (MEX)	2	0	2	2	8	1–3 PO1	1–3 PO1	—

Source: UWW

Semifinals
Giullia Penalber (BRA)	3^{C}
Betzabeth Sarco (VEN)	2
Lissette Antes (ECU)	4
Hannah Taylor (CAN)	4

Final
Giullia Penalber (BRA)	5^{F}
Hannah Taylor (CAN)	1
Bronze medal
Betzabeth Sarco (VEN)	WO
Lissette Antes (ECU)

==== Women's freestyle 59 kg ====
7 March

Pos	Athlete	Pld	W	L	CP	TP	CAN	PUR	USA	BRA
1	Alexandria Town (CAN)	3	3	0	12	36	—	12–1	14–4	10–0
2	Nes Marie Rodríguez (PUR)	3	2	1	8	31	1–4 SU1	—	17–9	13–3
3	Lauren Louive (USA)	3	1	2	5	25	1–4 SU1	1–3 PO1	—	12–3
4	Karoline Santana (BRA)	3	0	3	2	6	0–4 SU	1–4 SU1	1–3 PO1	—

Source: UWW

==== Women's freestyle 62 kg ====
8 March

Pos	Athlete	Pld	W	L	CP	TP	USA	BRA	DOM	MEX
1	Mallory Velte (USA)	3	3	0	10	28	—	6–4	15–4	7–0
2	Laís Nunes (BRA)	3	2	1	9	19	1–3 PO1	—	10–0 Fall	5–2
3	Yessica Oviedo (DOM)	3	1	2	4	8	1–4 SU1	0–5 FA	—	4–2
4	Alejandra Romero (MEX)	3	0	3	0	4	0–3 PO	1–3 PO1	1–3 PO1	—

Source: UWW

Pos	Athlete	Pld	W	L	CP	TP	CAN	VEN	COL
1	Jessica Brouillette (CAN)	2	2	0	7	26	—	16–6	10–6
2	Nathaly Grimán (VEN)	2	1	1	4	13	1–4 SU1	—	7–4
3	Jackeline Rentería (COL)	2	0	2	2	10	1–3 PO1	1–3 PO1	—

Source: UWW

Semifinals
Mallory Velte (USA)	4^{F}
Nathaly Grimán (VEN)	1
Jessica Brouillette (CAN)	0
Laís Nunes (BRA)	13

Final
Mallory Velte (USA)	6
Laís Nunes (BRA)	2
Bronze medal
Nathaly Grimán (VEN)	4
Jessica Brouillette (CAN)	5

==== Women's freestyle 68 kg ====
8 March

Round of 16
Tamyra Mensah (USA)	10^{'F}
Ámbar Garnica (MEX)	0

Quarterfinals
Yudaris Sánchez (CUB)	7
María Acosta (VEN)	2
Dailane Reis (BRA)	0
Luz Vázquez (ARG)	10
Olivia Di Bacco (CAN)	8
Leonela Ayoví (ECU)	1
Tatiana Rentería (COL)	0
Tamyra Mensah (USA)	11

Semifinals
Yudaris Sánchez (CUB)	5^{F}
Luz Vázquez (ARG)	3
Olivia Di Bacco (CAN)	0
Tamyra Mensah (USA)	8^{F}

Final
Yudaris Sánchez (CUB)	0
Tamyra Mensah (USA)	6^{F}

Repechage round 1
Ámbar Garnica (MEX)	8
Tatiana Rentería (COL)	6

Bronze medals
María Acosta (VEN)	11
Luz Vázquez (ARG)	0
Ámbar Garnica (MEX)	4
Olivia Di Bacco (CAN)	11

==== Women's freestyle 72 kg ====
7 March

Pos	Athlete	Pld	W	L	CP	TP	PER	USA	CAN	BRA
1	Yanet Sovero (PER)	3	3	0	14	22	—	4–0 Fall	10–0	8–0 Fall
2	Victoria Francis (USA)	3	2	1	8	25	0–5 FA	—	13–2	12–0
3	Shauna Kuebeck (CAN)	3	1	2	6	9	0–4 SU	1–4 SU1	—	7–0 Fall
4	Brenda Aguiar (BRA)	3	0	3	0	0	0–5 FA	0–4 SU	0–5 FA	—

Source: UWW

==== Women's freestyle 76 kg ====
8 March

Quarterfinals		Semifinals		Final
Justina Di Stasio (CAN)	5
Milaimys Marín (CUB)	2	Justina Di Stasio (CAN)	5
Aline Ferreira (BRA)	4^{F}	Aline Ferreira (BRA)	2
Génesis Reasco (ECU)	0			Justina Di Stasio (CAN)	WO
Adeline Gray (USA)	2^{F}			Adeline Gray (USA)
Andrimar Lázaro (VEN)	0	Adeline Gray (USA)	11^{F}
Gabriela Canales (MEX)	0	Andrea Olaya (COL)	0
Andrea Olaya (COL)	9^{F}

Bronze medals
Milaimys Marín (CUB)	1
Aline Ferreira (BRA)	3^{F}
Andrimar Lázaro (VEN)	0
Andrea Olaya (COL)	8
