= Wrestling at the 2015 Pan American Games – Men's freestyle 57 kg =

Men's Freestyle 57 kg at the 2015 Pan American Games
- Venue: Mississauga Sports Centre
- Dates: July 17
- Competitors: 7 from 7 nations

Medalists
Gold medal	Yowlys Bonne	Cuba
Silver medal	Angel Escobedo	United States
Bronze medal	Emir Hernandez	Colombia
Bronze medal	Pedro Mejías	Venezuela

The men's freestyle 57 kg competition of the Wrestling events at the 2015 Pan American Games in Toronto were held on July 17 at the Mississauga Sports Centre.

Canadian wrestler John Pineda was scheduled to be among the participants, but he did not make weight and had to withdraw from the event.

== Schedule ==
All times are Eastern Daylight Time (UTC-4).

Date	Time	Round
July 17, 2015	14:44	Quarterfinals
July 17, 2015	15:47	Semifinals
July 17, 2015	21:39	Bronze medal matches
July 17, 2015	21:57	Final

== Results ==
Legend

- F — Won by fall

=== Final ===
Quarterfinals		Semifinals		Finals
		Pablo Benites (PER)	0
Emir Hernandez (COL)	0	Angel Escobedo (USA)	6^{F}
Angel Escobedo (USA)	10			Angel Escobedo (USA)	0
Pedro Mejías (VEN)	4			Yowlys Bonne (CUB)	10
Jefferson Mayea (ECU)	0	Pedro Mejías (VEN)	2
Yowlys Bonne (CUB)	10^{F}	Yowlys Bonne (CUB)	12
Kevin Bonilla (HON)	0

=== Repechage ===
Bronze medal match
Emir Hernandez (COL)	6
Pablo Benites (PER)	1
Kevin Bonilla (HON)	0
Pedro Mejías (VEN)	7
