= Ángel Pacheco =

Ángel Pacheco may refer to:

- Ángel Pacheco (general)
- Ángel Pacheco (boxer)
- Ángel Pacheco (wrestler)
