= Wrestling at the 2019 Pan American Games – Men's freestyle 65 kg =

Men's Freestyle 65 kg at the 2019 Pan American Games
- Venue: Miguel Grau Coliseum
- Dates: August 9
- Competitors: 8 from 8 nations

Medalists
Gold medal	Alejandro Valdés	Cuba
Silver medal	Álbaro Rudesindo	Dominican Republic
Bronze medal	Mauricio Sánchez	Ecuador
Bronze medal	Jaydin Eierman	United States

The men's freestyle 65 kg competition of the Wrestling events at the 2019 Pan American Games in Lima was held on August 9 at the Miguel Grau Coliseum.

== Results ==
All times are local (UTC−5)

Legend

- F — Won by fall

=== Final ===
Quarterfinals		Semifinals		Finals
Luis Mallqui (PER)	4
Mauricio Sánchez (ECU)	15	Mauricio Sánchez (ECU)	0
Álbaro Rudesindo (DOM)	10	Álbaro Rudesindo (DOM)	10
Brandon Díaz (MEX)	0			Álbaro Rudesindo (DOM)	0
Wilfredo Rodríguez (VEN)	10			Alejandro Valdés (CUB)	10
Agustín Destribats (ARG)	17	Agustín Destribats (ARG)	0
Jaydin Eierman (USA)	0	Alejandro Valdés (CUB)	4^{F}
Alejandro Valdés (CUB)	10

=== Repechage ===
Bronze medal match
Brandon Díaz (MEX)	0
Mauricio Sánchez (ECU)	3
Jaydin Eierman (USA)	15
Agustín Destribats (ARG)	4
