= Carolina Castillo (wrestler) =

Colombian freestyle wrestler

Personal information
- Born: 4 November 1990 (age 35) Cali, Colombia

Sport
- Sport: Freestyle wrestling
Medal record
Representing Colombia
Women's freestyle wrestling
Pan American Games
Bronze medal – third place	2011 Guadalajara	48 kg
Bronze medal – third place	2015 Toronto	48 kg
Bronze medal – third place	2019 Lima	50 kg
Pan American Championships
Silver medal – second place	2017 Salvador	53 kg
Silver medal – second place	2018 Lima	50 kg
Silver medal – second place	2020 Ottawa	50 kg
Bronze medal – third place	2009 Maracaibo	48 kg
Bronze medal – third place	2011 Rionegro	48 kg
Central American and Caribbean Games
Gold medal – first place	2014 Veracruz	48 kg
Gold medal – first place	2018 Barranquilla	50 kg
Silver medal – second place	2010 Mayagüez	48 kg
South American Games
Gold medal – first place	2014 Santiago	48 kg
Gold medal – first place	2018 Cochabamba	50 kg
Silver medal – second place	2010 Medellín	48 kg
Bolivarian Games
Gold medal – first place	2013 Trujillo	48 kg
Silver medal – second place	2009 Sucre	48 kg
Silver medal – second place	2017 Santa Marta	53 kg

Carolina Castillo Hidalgo (born 4 November 1990) is a Colombian freestyle wrestler. She competed in the freestyle 48 kg event at the 2012 Summer Olympics and was eliminated in the qualifications by Davaasükhiin Otgontsetseg. She competed in the same event at the 2016 Summer Olympics, beating Chov Sotheara before losing to Elitsa Yankova in the quarterfinals.

In 2020, she competed in the 2020 Pan American Wrestling Olympic Qualification Tournament, held in Ottawa, Canada, without qualifying for the 2020 Summer Olympics in Tokyo, Japan.
