= Betzabeth Sarco =

Venezuelan freestyle wrestler

Personal information
- Full name: Betzabeth Rebecca Sarco Colmenarez
- Born: 26 April 1994 (age 32)
- Height: 165 cm (5 ft 5 in)

Sport
- Country: Venezuela
- Sport: Amateur wrestling
- Weight class: 57 kg
- Event: Freestyle
Medal record
Women's freestyle wrestling
Representing Venezuela
South American Games
Bronze medal – third place	2018 Cochabamba	57 kg
Pan American Championships
Bronze medal – third place	2019 Buenos Aires	57 kg
Bronze medal – third place	2020 Ottawa	57 kg
Bronze medal – third place	2023 Buenos Aires	57 kg
Central American and Caribbean Games
Bronze medal – third place	2023 San Salvador	57 kg

Betzabeth Rebecca Sarco Colmenarez (Note: In this Spanish name, the first or paternal surname is Sarco and the second or maternal family name is Colmenarez.) (born 26 April 1994) is a Venezuelan freestyle wrestler. She is a bronze medalist in the women's 57 kg event at the 2018 South American Games held in Cochabamba, Bolivia. She is also a three-time bronze medalist in this event at the Pan American Wrestling Championships.

== Career ==
In 2015, Sarco represented Venezuela at the Pan American Games in Toronto, Canada and she competed in the 58 kg event where she was eliminated in her first match by Yanet Sovero. Sovero went on to win one of the bronze medals. Later that year, Sarco competed in the 58 kg event at the 2015 World Wrestling Championships held in Las Vegas, United States where she was eliminated in her first match by Tetyana Lavrenchuk of Ukraine.

In 2018, Sarco won one of the bronze medals in the 57 kg event at the South American Games held in Cochabamba, Bolivia.

At the 2020 Pan American Wrestling Championships held in Ottawa, Canada, she won one of the bronze medals in the 57 kg event. She also competed in the 2020 Pan American Wrestling Olympic Qualification Tournament, also held in Ottawa, Canada, without qualifying for the 2020 Summer Olympics in Tokyo, Japan. She also failed to qualify for the Olympics at the World Olympic Qualification Tournament held in Sofia, Bulgaria.

Sarco competed at the 2024 Pan American Wrestling Olympic Qualification Tournament held in Acapulco, Mexico hoping to qualify for the 2024 Summer Olympics in Paris, France. She was eliminated in her first match by Luisa Valverde of Ecuador.

== Achievements ==
Year	Tournament	Location	Result	Event
2018	South American Games	Cochabamba, Bolivia	3rd	Freestyle 57 kg
2019	Pan American Wrestling Championships	Buenos Aires, Argentina	3rd	Freestyle 57 kg
2020	Pan American Wrestling Championships	Ottawa, Canada	3rd	Freestyle 57 kg
2023	Pan American Wrestling Championships	Buenos Aires, Argentina	3rd	Freestyle 57 kg
2023	Central American and Caribbean Games	San Salvador, El Salvador	3rd	Freestyle 57 kg
