= Wrestling at the 2014 South American Games =

- Venue: Polideportivo de Carabineros
- Dates: March 26–29

The wrestling competition at the 2014 South American Games was held in Santiago, Chile. The tournament was held from 25 to 29 March at the Polideportivo de Carabineros. The winner of each event qualified their country for the 2015 Pan American Games in Toronto, Canada.

== Medal table ==
Rank	Nation	Gold	Silver	Bronze	Total
1	Venezuela (VEN)	8	2	5	15
2	Colombia (COL)	4	6	4	14
3	Ecuador (ECU)	3	1	7	11
4	Brazil (BRA)	2	1	5	8
5	Argentina (ARG)	0	3	3	6
6	Peru (PER)	0	2	4	6
7	Chile (CHI)	0	2	0	2
8	Panama (PAN)	0	0	4	4
Totals (8 entries)		17	17	32	66

== Medal summary ==
Results:

=== Men's events ===
Event	Gold	Silver	Bronze
Freestyle 57 kg	Pedro Mejías; Venezuela	Andre Quispe; Chile	Wellington Silva; Brazil; Pablo Benites Gomez; Peru
Freestyle 65 kg	Hernan Guzman; Colombia	Abel Herrera; Peru	Elvis Fuentes; Venezuela; Mauricio Sanchez; Ecuador
Freestyle 74 kg	Yoan Blanco; Ecuador	Edison Hurtado; Colombia	Rafael Jesus; Venezuela; Cristian Sarco; Brazil
Freestyle 86 kg	Pedro Ceballo; Venezuela	Pool Ambrocio; Peru	Elton Brown; Panama; Adrian Jaoude; Brazil
Freestyle 97 kg	Jarlys Mosquera; Colombia	Yuri Maier; Argentina	Juan Espinoza; Ecuador; Jhosser Gonzalez; Venezuela
Freestyle 125 kg	Luis Vivenes; Venezuela	Victor Asprilla; Colombia	Jesus Aponte; Peru; Rodolofo Waithe; Panama
Greco-Roman 59 kg	Andres Montano; Ecuador	Juan Lopez Asprilla; Colombia	Jose Magallanes; Peru; Diego Romanelli; Brazil
Greco-Roman 66 kg	Luis Liendo; Venezuela	Jair Cuero; Colombia	Milton Guallpa; Ecuador; Moises Soto; Panama
Greco-Roman 75 kg	Yorgen Cova; Venezuela	Carlos Muñoz; Colombia	Vicente Huacon; Ecuador
Greco-Roman 85 kg	Alexander Brazon; Venezuela	Cristhian Mosquera; Colombia	Enrique Cuero; Ecuador; Ronisson Santiago; Brazil
Greco-Roman 98 kg	Erwin Caraballo; Venezuela	Ivan Burtovoy; Argentina	Luis Obando; Ecuador; Oscar Loango; Colombia
Greco-Roman 130 kg	Rafael Barreno; Venezuela	Andres Ayub; Chile	Rodolofo Waithe; Panama; Victor Asprilla; Colombia

=== Women's events ===
Event	Gold	Silver	Bronze
Freestyle 48 kg	Carolina Castillo; Colombia	Patricia Bermúdez; Argentina	Katiuska Toaza; Ecuador; Mayelis Caripá; Venezuela
Freestyle 53 kg	Lissette Antes; Ecuador	Betzabeth Argüello; Venezuela	Eluney Melita; Argentina; Jenny Mallqui; Peru
Freestyle 63 kg	Jackeline Rentería; Colombia	Laís Nunes; Brazil	Luz Vazquez; Argentina; Soleymi Caraballo; Venezuela
Freestyle 69 kg	Gilda Oliveira; Brazil	Mayra Antes; Ecuador	Laura Garcia; Argentina; Leidy Izquierdo; Colombia
Freestyle 75 kg	Aline Ferreira; Brazil	Jarimit Weffer; Venezuela	Andrea Olaya; Colombia
