= Wrestling at the 2013 Bolivarian Games =

Wrestling (Spanish:Lucha), for the 2013 Bolivarian Games, took place from 21 November to 23 November 2013.

== Medal table ==
Key:

* Host nation (Peru)

Rank	Nation	Gold	Silver	Bronze	Total
1	Venezuela (VEN)	11	2	3	16
2	Ecuador (ECU)	4	3	6	13
3	Colombia (COL)	3	8	10	21
4	Peru (PER)*	2	6	3	11
5	Dominican Republic (DOM)	1	2	8	11
6	Panama (PAN)	0	0	3	3
7	Bolivia (BOL)	0	0	1	1
7	Chile (CHI)	0	0	1	1
Totals (8 entries)		21	21	35	77

== Medal summary ==
=== Men's Greco-Roman ===
Event	Gold	Silver	Bronze
55 kg	Jairo Medina (VEN)	Jefferson Mayea (ECU)	Jansel González (DOM)
55 kg	Jairo Medina (VEN)	Jefferson Mayea (ECU)	Ditcher Toro (COL)
60 kg	Andrés Montaño (ECU)	José Luis Magallanes (PER)	Jansel Ramírez (DOM)
60 kg	Andrés Montaño (ECU)	José Luis Magallanes (PER)	Julio Muñoz (COL)
66 kg	Luis Liendo (VEN)	Luis Enrique Guallpa (ECU)	Jhomaylen Mañón (DOM)
66 kg	Luis Liendo (VEN)	Luis Enrique Guallpa (ECU)	Jair Cuero (COL)
74 kg	Vicente Huacón (ECU)	Álvaro Hubiera (DOM)	Carlos Muñoz (COL)
84 kg	Alexander Brazon (VEN)	José Mercado (ECU)	Cristhian Mosquera (COL)
84 kg	Alexander Brazon (VEN)	José Mercado (ECU)	Luis Vaca (BOL)
96 kg	Erwin Caraballo (VEN)	Oscar Loango (COL)	Juan Carlos Espinoza (ECU)
120 kg	Ramón García (DOM)	Juan Camacaro (VEN)	Rodolfo Waithe (PAN)
120 kg	Ramón García (DOM)	Juan Camacaro (VEN)	Víctor Asprilla (COL)

=== Men's freestyle ===
Event	Gold	Silver	Bronze
55 kg	Pedro Mejías (VEN)	Uber Cuero (COL)	Jeffry Serrata (DOM)
55 kg	Pedro Mejías (VEN)	Uber Cuero (COL)	Ronny Cedeño (ECU)
60 kg	Abel Herrera (PER)	Ezequiel Díaz (DOM)	Dicther Toro (COL)
60 kg	Abel Herrera (PER)	Ezequiel Díaz (DOM)	Ibsen Aguilar (VEN)
66 kg	Yoan Blanco (ECU)	Hernán Guzmán (COL)	Abraham Llontop (PER)
66 kg	Yoan Blanco (ECU)	Hernán Guzmán (COL)	Cesar Roberty (VEN)
74 kg	Ricardo Roberty (VEN)	José Ambrocio (PER)	Elton Brown (PAN)
74 kg	Ricardo Roberty (VEN)	José Ambrocio (PER)	Edison Hurtado (COL)
84 kg	José Díaz (VEN)	Pool Ambrocio (PER)	José Mercado (ECU)
84 kg	José Díaz (VEN)	Pool Ambrocio (PER)	Juan Martínez (COL)
96 kg	Jhosser González (VEN)	Jarlys Mosquera (COL)	Piero Burgos (CHI)
96 kg	Jhosser González (VEN)	Jarlys Mosquera (COL)	Luis Miguel Pérez (DOM)
120 kg	Luis Vivenes (VEN)	Víctor Asprilla (COL)	Josué Encarnación (DOM)
120 kg	Luis Vivenes (VEN)	Víctor Asprilla (COL)	Rodolfo Waithe (PAN)

=== Women's freestyle ===
Event	Gold	Silver	Bronze
48 kg	Carolina Castillo (COL)	Thalia Mallqui (PER)	Angélica Bustos (ECU)
51 kg	Aguis Rivas (VEN)	Jenny Mallqui (PER)	Luisa Valverde (ECU)
51 kg	Aguis Rivas (VEN)	Jenny Mallqui (PER)	Maryuri Valencia (COL)
55 kg	Lissette Antes (ECU)	Sayury Cañón (COL)	Yessica Oviedo (DOM)
55 kg	Lissette Antes (ECU)	Sayury Cañón (COL)	Marcia Andrades (VEN)
59 kg	Sandra Roa (COL)	Yanet Sovero (PER)	Mayra Antes (ECU)
63 kg	Jackeline Rentería (COL)	Mauris Serrano (VEN)	Diana Victoria (PER)
67 kg	Jessica Olivares (PER)	Leydi Izquierdo (COL)	Elsa Sánchez (DOM)
72 kg	Jaramit Weffer (VEN)	Andrea Olaya (COL)	Kelly Díaz (PER)
