= Wrestling at the 2019 Pan American Games – Men's Greco-Roman 130 kg =

Men's Greco-Roman 130 kg at the 2019 Pan American Games
- Venue: Miguel Grau Coliseum
- Dates: August 8
- Competitors: 8 from 8 nations

Medalists
Gold medal	Mijaín López	Cuba
Silver medal	Moisés Pérez	Venezuela
Bronze medal	Leo Santana	Dominican Republic
Bronze medal	Yasmani Acosta	Chile

The Men's Greco-Roman 130 kg competition of the Wrestling events at the 2019 Pan American Games in Lima was held on August 8 at the Miguel Grau Coliseum.

== Results ==
All times are local (UTC−5)

=== Final ===
Quarterfinals		Semifinals		Finals
Moisés Pérez (VEN)	6
Edgardo López (PUR)	1	Moisés Pérez (VEN)	7
Leo Santana (DOM)	8	Leo Santana (DOM)	0
Daniel Medina (PER)	0			Moisés Pérez (VEN)	0
Yasmani Acosta (CHI)	8			Mijaín López (CUB)	9
Adam Coon (USA)	0	Yasmani Acosta (CHI)	0
Luciano del Río (ARG)	0	Mijaín López (CUB)	4
Mijaín López (CUB)	8

=== Repechage ===
Bronze medal match
Edgardo López (PUR)	0
Leo Santana (DOM)	2
Luciano del Río (ARG)	0
Yasmani Acosta (CHI)	9
