= Leonela Ayoví =

Ecuadorian freestyle wrestler

Personal information
- Full name: Leonela Aleyda Ayoví Parraga
- Born: 7 March 1997 (age 29)

Sport
- Country: Ecuador
- Sport: Amateur wrestling
- Weight class: 62 kg; 68 kg
- Event: Freestyle
Medal record
Women's freestyle wrestling
Representing Ecuador
Pan American Championships
Bronze medal – third place	2018 Lima	68 kg
Bronze medal – third place	2024 Acapulco	68 kg
Bolivarian Games
Silver medal – second place	2022 Valledupar	62 kg
Bronze medal – third place	2017 Santa Marta	58 kg

Leonela Aleyda Ayoví Parraga (born 7 March 1997) is an Ecuadorian freestyle wrestler. She is a silver and bronze medalist at the Bolivarian Games. She is also a two-time bronze medalist at the Pan American Wrestling Championships.

== Career ==
In 2012, 2013 and 2014 she won medals at youth and junior levels at both national and international competitions. In 2014, she competed in the women's 70 kg event at the Summer Youth Olympics held in Nanjing, China.

Ayoví won one of the bronze medals in the women's 58 kg event at the 2017 Bolivarian Games held in Santa Marta, Colombia. She won one of the bronze medals in the women's 68 kg event at the 2018 Pan American Wrestling Championships held in Lima, Peru. She competed the women's 68 kg event at the 2018 South American Games held in Cochabamba, Bolivia.

Ayoví competed in the women's 68 kg event at the 2019 Pan American Wrestling Championships held in Buenos Aires, Argentina. At the 2019 Pan American Games held in Lima, Peru, she competed in the women's 68 kg event. She was eliminated in her first match by María Acosta of Venezuela.

In 2020, Ayoví competed in her event at the Pan American Wrestling Championships held in Ottawa, Canada. She competed at the Pan American Wrestling Olympic Qualification Tournament held in Ottawa, Canada without qualifying for the 2020 Summer Olympics in Tokyo, Japan. She also competed at the 2021 Pan American Wrestling Championships held in Guatemala City, Guatemala and the 2022 Pan American Wrestling Championships held in Acapulco, Mexico.

Ayoví won the silver medal in the women's 62 kg event at the 2022 Bolivarian Games held in Valledupar, Colombia. In 2023, she competed in the women's 62 kg event at the Pan American Wrestling Championships held in Buenos Aires, Argentina.

Ayoví won a bronze medal in the women's 68 kg event at the 2024 Pan American Wrestling Championships held in Acapulco, Mexico. A few days later, she competed at the 2024 Pan American Wrestling Olympic Qualification Tournament held in Acapulco, Mexico hoping to qualify for the 2024 Summer Olympics in Paris, France. She was eliminated in her first match.

== Achievements ==
Year	Tournament	Location	Result	Event
2017	Bolivarian Games	Santa Marta, Colombia	3rd	Freestyle 58 kg
2018	Pan American Wrestling Championships	Lima, Peru	3rd	Freestyle 68 kg
2022	Bolivarian Games	Valledupar, Colombia	2nd	Freestyle 62 kg
2024	Pan American Wrestling Championships	Acapulco, Mexico	3rd	Freestyle 68 kg
