= Pedro Mejías =

Venezuelan freestyle wrestler

Personal information
- Full name: Pedro Jesús Mejías Rodríguez
- Nationality: Venezuela
- Born: 18 December 1991 (age 34) Venezuela
- Height: 159 cm (5 ft 3 in)

Sport
- Country: Venezuela
- Sport: Amateur wrestling
- Weight class: 57 kg
- Event: Freestyle
Medal record
Men's freestyle wrestling
Representing Venezuela
Pan American Games
Bronze medal – third place	2015 Toronto	57 kg
Pan American Championships
Silver medal – second place	2020 Ottawa	57 kg
Silver medal – second place	2024 Acapulco	57 kg
Bronze medal – third place	2013 Panama City	55 kg
Bronze medal – third place	2016 Prisco	61 kg
Bronze medal – third place	2019 Buenos Aires	57 kg
Bronze medal – third place	2023 Buenos Aires	57 kg
Bronze medal – third place	2026 Coralville	57 kg
Central American and Caribbean Games
Gold medal – first place	2014 Veracruz	57 kg
Bronze medal – third place	2018 Barranquilla	57 kg
Bronze medal – third place	2026 Santo Domingo	57 kg
South American Games
Gold medal – first place	2014 Santiago de Chile	57 kg
Gold medal – first place	2018 Cochabamba	57 kg
Silver medal – second place	2022 Asunción	57 kg
Bolivarian Games
Gold medal – first place	2013 Trujillo	55 kg
Bronze medal – third place	2017 Santa Marta	57 kg

Pedro Jesús Mejías Rodríguez (Note: In this Spanish name, the first or paternal surname is Mejías and the second or maternal family name is Rodríguez.) (born 18 December 1991) is a Venezuelan freestyle wrestler. He is a two-time gold medalist at the South American Games and a bronze medalist at the Pan American Games. He is also a two-time medalist at the Central American and Caribbean Games and a six-time medalist at the Pan American Wrestling Championships.

== Career ==
In 2019, Mejías competed in the 57 kg event at the Pan American Games held in Lima, Peru without winning a medal; he was eliminated in his first match by Reineri Andreu of Cuba.

In March 2020, Mejías won the silver medal in the 57 kg event at the 2020 Pan American Wrestling Championships held in Ottawa, Canada. He also competed in the 2020 Pan American Wrestling Olympic Qualification Tournament, also held in Ottawa, Canada, without qualifying for the 2020 Summer Olympics in Tokyo, Japan. He also failed to qualify for the Olympics at the World Olympic Qualification Tournament held in Sofia, Bulgaria.

Mejías won the silver medal in his event at the 2022 South American Games held in Asunción, Paraguay. He won the silver medal in his event at the 2024 Pan American Wrestling Championships held in Acapulco, Mexico. Mejías competed at the Pan American Wrestling Olympic Qualification Tournament held in Acapulco, Mexico hoping to qualify for the 2024 Summer Olympics in Paris, France. He also competed at the 2024 World Wrestling Olympic Qualification Tournament held in Istanbul, Turkey without qualifying for the Olympics.

== Achievements ==
Year	Tournament	Location	Result	Event
2013	Pan American Wrestling Championships	Panama City, Panama	3rd	Freestyle 55 kg
2013	Bolivarian Games	Trujillo, Peru	1st	Freestyle 55 kg
2014	South American Games	Santiago, Chile	1st	Freestyle 57 kg
2014	Central American and Caribbean Games	Veracruz, Mexico	1st	Freestyle 57 kg
2015	Pan American Games	Toronto, Canada	3rd	Freestyle 57 kg
2016	Pan American Wrestling Championships	Frisco, United States	3rd	Freestyle 61 kg
2017	Bolivarian Games	Santa Marta, Colombia	3rd	Freestyle 57 kg
2018	South American Games	Cochabamba, Bolivia	1st	Freestyle 57 kg
2018	Central American and Caribbean Games	Barranquilla, Colombia	3rd	Freestyle 57 kg
2019	Pan American Wrestling Championships	Buenos Aires, Argentina	3rd	Freestyle 57 kg
2020	Pan American Wrestling Championships	Ottawa, Canada	2nd	Freestyle 57 kg
2022	South American Games	Asunción, Paraguay	2nd	Freestyle 57 kg
2023	Pan American Wrestling Championships	Buenos Aires, Argentina	3rd	Freestyle 57 kg
2024	Pan American Wrestling Championships	Acapulco, Mexico	2nd	Freestyle 57 kg
