= Moisés Pérez =

Venezuelan Greco-Roman wrestler

Personal information
- Full name: Moisés Salvador Pérez Hellburg
- Born: 2 November 1994 (age 32)

Sport
- Country: Venezuela
- Sport: Amateur wrestling
- Weight class: 130 kg
- Event: Greco-Roman
Medal record
Men's Greco-Roman wrestling
Representing Venezuela
Pan American Games
Silver medal – second place	2019 Lima	130 kg
Bronze medal – third place	2023 Santiago	130 kg
Pan American Wrestling Championships
Bronze medal – third place	2020 Ottawa	130 kg
Bronze medal – third place	2024 Acapulco	130 kg
Bronze medal – third place	2025 Monterrey	130 kg
Central American and Caribbean Games
Bronze medal – third place	2018 Barranquilla	130 kg
Bronze medal – third place	2026 Santo Domingo	130 kg

Moisés Salvador Pérez Hellburg (Note: In this Spanish name, the first or paternal surname is Pérez and the second or maternal family name is Hellburg.) (born 2 November 1994) is a Venezuelan Greco-Roman wrestler. He won the silver medal in the 130 kg event at the 2019 Pan American Games held in Lima, Peru. In the final, he lost against Mijaín López of Cuba.

== Career ==
At the 2020 Pan American Wrestling Championships held in Ottawa, Canada, Pérez won one of the bronze medals in the 130 kg event. He also competed in the 2020 Pan American Wrestling Olympic Qualification Tournament, also held in Ottawa, Canada, without qualifying for the 2020 Summer Olympics. In May 2021, Pérez also failed to qualify for the Olympics at the World Olympic Qualification Tournament held in Sofia, Bulgaria as he was eliminated in his first match by Arata Sonoda of Japan.

Pérez won a bronze medal in his event at the 2024 Pan American Wrestling Championships held in Acapulco, Mexico. A few days later, he competed at the 2024 Pan American Wrestling Olympic Qualification Tournament held in Acapulco, Mexico hoping to qualify for the 2024 Summer Olympics in Paris, France. He was eliminated in the semifinals by Cohlton Schultz of the United States. Pérez also competed at the 2024 World Wrestling Olympic Qualification Tournament held in Istanbul, Turkey without qualifying for the Olympics.

== Achievements ==
Year	Tournament	Location	Result	Event
2018	Central American and Caribbean Games	Barranquilla, Colombia	3rd	Greco-Roman 130 kg
2019	Pan American Games	Lima, Peru	2nd	Greco-Roman 130 kg
2020	Pan American Wrestling Championships	Ottawa, Canada	3rd	Greco-Roman 130 kg
2023	Pan American Games	Santiago, Chile	3rd	Greco-Roman 130 kg
2024	Pan American Wrestling Championships	Acapulco, Mexico	3rd	Greco-Roman 130 kg
2025	Pan American Wrestling Championships	Monterrey, Mexico	3rd	Greco-Roman 130 kg
