= Leo Santana (wrestler) =

Dominican Republic Greco-Roman wrestler

Personal information
- Full name: Leo Dalis Santana Heredia
- Born: 7 June 1998 (age 28)

Sport
- Country: Dominican Republic
- Sport: Amateur wrestling
- Weight class: 130 kg
- Event: Greco-Roman
Medal record
Men's Greco-Roman wrestling
Representing Dominican Republic
Pan American Games
Bronze medal – third place	2019 Lima	130 kg
Pan American Wrestling Championships
Gold medal – first place	2021 Guatemala City	130 kg
Bronze medal – third place	2020 Ottawa	130 kg
Bronze medal – third place	2022 Acapulco	130 kg
Central American and Caribbean Games
Silver medal – second place	2018 Barranquilla	130 kg

Leo Dalis Santana Heredia (Note: In this Spanish name, the first or paternal surname is Santana and the second or maternal family name is Heredia.) (born 7 June 1998) is a Dominican Republic Greco-Roman wrestler. He won one of the bronze medals in the 130 kg event at the 2019 Pan American Games held in Lima, Peru. He also won the gold medal in his event at the 2021 Pan American Wrestling Championships held in Guatemala City, Guatemala.

== Career ==
In 2018, he won the silver medal in the 130 kg event at the Central American and Caribbean Games held in Barranquilla, Colombia.

At the 2020 Pan American Wrestling Championships held in Ottawa, Canada, he won one of the bronze medals in the 130 kg event. He also competed in the 2020 Pan American Wrestling Olympic Qualification Tournament, also held in Ottawa, Canada, without qualifying for the 2020 Summer Olympics in Tokyo, Japan. In May 2021, he also failed to qualify for the Olympics at the World Olympic Qualification Tournament held in Sofia, Bulgaria.

He won one of the bronze medals in his event at the 2022 Pan American Wrestling Championships held in Acapulco, Mexico.

== Major results ==
Year	Tournament	Location	Result	Event
2018	Central American and Caribbean Games	Barranquilla, Colombia	2nd	Greco-Roman 130 kg
2019	Pan American Games	Lima, Peru	3rd	Greco-Roman 130 kg
2020	Pan American Wrestling Championships	Ottawa, Canada	3rd	Greco-Roman 130 kg
2021	Pan American Wrestling Championships	Guatemala City, Guatemala	1st	Greco-Roman 130 kg
2022	Pan American Wrestling Championships	Acapulco, Mexico	3rd	Greco-Roman 130 kg
