= Ángel Pacheco (wrestler) =

Cuban Greco-Roman wrestler

Personal information
- Full name: Ángel Ernesto Pacheco Romero

Sport
- Country: Cuba
- Sport: Amateur wrestling
- Weight class: 130 kg
- Event: Greco-Roman
Medal record
Men's Greco-Roman wrestling
Representing Cuba
Pan American Wrestling Championships
Bronze medal – third place	2019 Buenos Aires	130 kg
Gold medal – first place	2020 Ottawa	130 kg

Ángel Ernesto Pacheco Romero is a Cuban Greco-Roman wrestler. At the 2020 Pan American Wrestling Championships held in Ottawa, Canada he won the gold medal in the 130 kg event. A year earlier, he won one of the bronze medals in this event.

In March 2020, he competed in the 2020 Pan American Wrestling Olympic Qualification Tournament without qualifying for the 2020 Summer Olympics.

== Achievements ==
Year	Tournament	Location	Result	Event
2019	Pan American Wrestling Championships	Buenos Aires, Argentina	3rd	Greco-Roman 130 kg
2020	Pan American Wrestling Championships	Ottawa, Canada	1st	Greco-Roman 130 kg
