= Alexandria Town =

Canadian wrestler (born 1995)

Alex Town
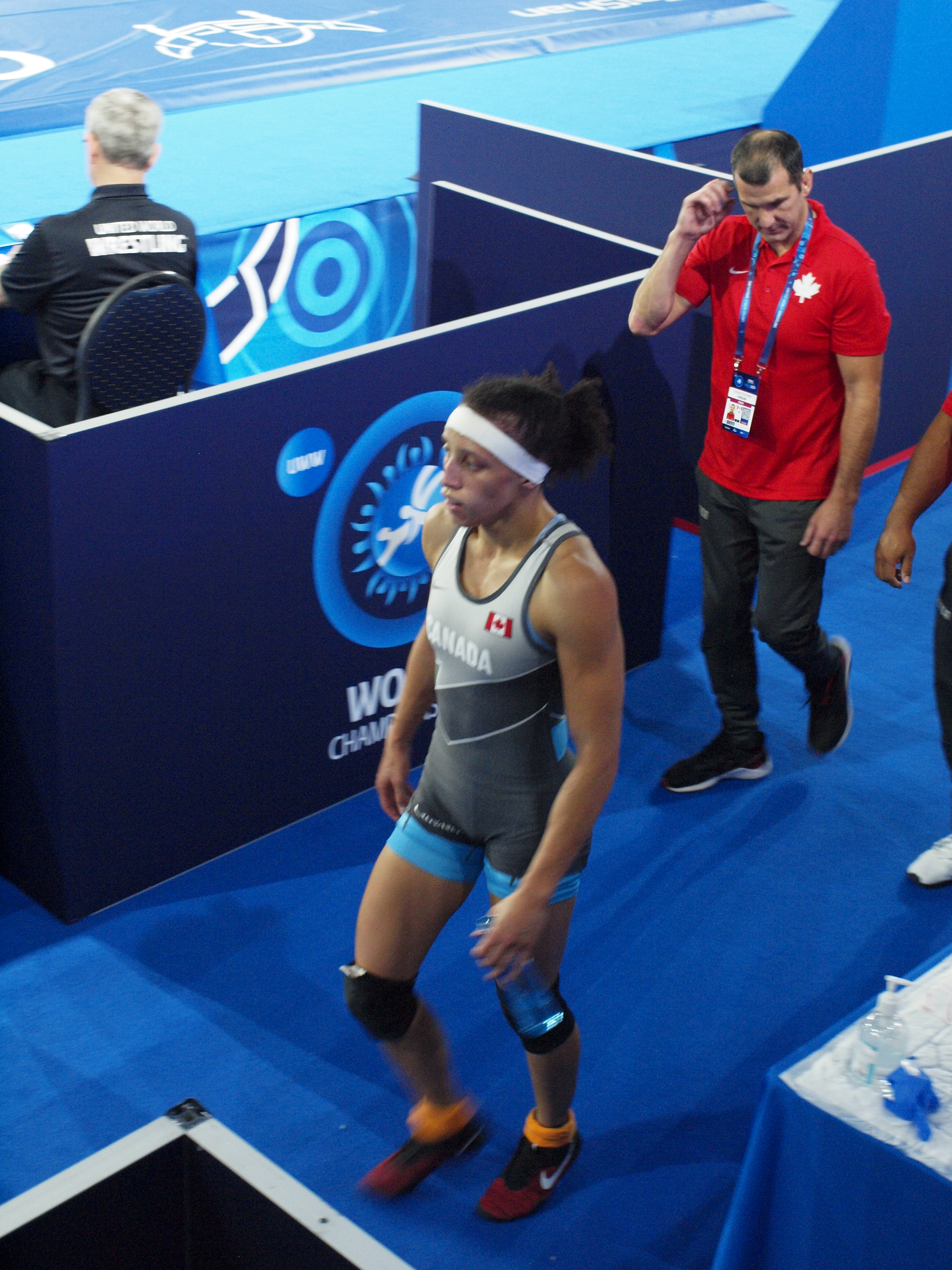

Personal information
- Full name: Alexandria Rebekkah Town
- Born: July 6, 1995 (age 31) Scarborough, Ontario, Canada
- Education: York University (in Kinesiology)
- Height: 5 ft 6 in (168 cm)
- Weight: 57 kg (126 lb)
- Website: Official Instagram Profile

Sport
- Country: Canada
- Sport: Wrestling
- Event: Freestyle
- College team: York Lions
Medal record
Women's freestyle wrestling
Representing Canada
Event	1st	2nd	3rd
Pan Am Championships	1	1	2
FISU World University Championships	–	1	–
U23 World Championships	1	–	–
World U23 Championships
Gold medal – first place	2018 Bucharest	57 kg

Alexandria Town (born July 6, 1995) is a Canadian freestyle wrestler, competing in the 57 kg weight class. In November 2018, Alex became the first ever Canadian to win a gold medal at the U23 World Championships. She has also secured Canada a place at the 2019 Pan Am Games by winning the bronze medal at 2018 Pan American Wrestling Championships.

In March 2020 she won the women's 59 kg title at the 2020 Pan American Wrestling Championships in Ottawa, Canada, followed by a silver medal in the 57 kg division at the 2021 Pan American Wrestling Championships in Guatemala City, Guatemala.

In October 2021, she was eliminated in her first match in the women's 57 kg event at the 2021 World Wrestling Championships in Oslo, Norway.

She won a bronze medal in her event at the 2022 Pan American Wrestling Championships held in Acapulco, Mexico, making her a 4x Pan American medalist.

She won the gold medal in her event at the 2023 Ibrahim Moustafa Tournament held in Alexandria, Egypt.

== International matches ==
Res.	Opponent	Score	Date	Event	Location
Win	(Japan) Akie Hanai	7-4	Nov 16, 2018	2018 U23 World Championships	(Romania) Bucharest
Win	(Mongolia) Tserenchimed Sukhee	15-3	Nov 16, 2018	2018 U23 World Championships	(Romania) Bucharest
Win	(Azerbaijan) Alyona Kolesnik	10-0	Nov 16, 2018	2018 U23 World Championships	(Romania) Bucharest
Win	(Hungary) Tamara Dollak	Tech Fall (10–0)	Nov 16, 2018	2018 U23 World Championships	(Romania) Bucharest
