= Brandon Díaz =

Mexican wrestler (born 1993)

Personal information
- Full name: Brandon Disair Díaz Ramírez
- Born: March 24, 1993 (age 33) Río Grande, Zacatecas, Mexico
- Height: 1.65 m (5 ft 5 in)
- Weight: 68 kg (150 lb)

Sport
- Sport: Amateur wrestling
- Event: Freestyle
- Club: Mexican CNAR (NHPC)
Medal record
Men's Freestyle wrestling
Representing Mexico
Central American and Caribbean Games
Bronze medal – third place	2014 Veracruz	65 kg
Pan American Championships
Bronze medal – third place	2013 Panama City	60 kg
Silver medal – second place	2014 Mexico City	65 kg
Silver medal – second place	2020 Ottawa	70 kg
Junior Pan American Championships
Bronze medal – third place	2012 Peten	60 kg
Silver medal – second place	2013 Santiago	60 kg
Cadet Pan American Championships
Gold medal – first place	2010 Manaus	63 kg

Brandon Disair Díaz Ramírez (born March 24, 1993) is a Mexican freestyle wrestler.

== Career ==
Díaz started wrestling when he was 10 years old and has been active in competition since 2006 under the coaching of Manuel Viramontes. He has competed at multiple world-class level tournaments such as the World Championships, the Central American and Caribbean Games, the Pan American Games, the Pan American Championships and numerous Grands Prix, medaling at some of them.

== Major results ==
Year	Tournament	Location	Result	Event
2013	Pan American Wrestling Championships	Panama City, Panama	3rd	Freestyle 60 kg
2014	Pan American Wrestling Championships	Mexico City, Mexico	2nd	Freestyle 65 kg
2014	Central American and Caribbean Games	Veracruz, Mexico	3rd	Freestyle 65 kg
2020	Pan American Wrestling Championships	Ottawa, Canada	2nd	Freestyle 70 kg
