= Kevin Bonilla =

American soccer player (born 2001)

Personal information
- Full name: Jose Kevin Bonilla Zamora
- Date of birth: September 20, 2001 (age 25)
- Place of birth: Dallas, Texas, U.S.
- Height: 1.72 m (5 ft 7 1/2 in)
- Position: Defender

Team information
- Current team: Tacoma Defiance
- Number: 38

Youth career
- 2010–2020: FC Dallas

College career
Years	Team	Apps	(Gls)
2020–2023	Portland Pilots	57	(3)

Senior career*
Years	Team	Apps	(Gls)
2019–2020	North Texas SC	23	(0)
2023	United PDX		
2024	Real Salt Lake	0	(0)
2025	Real Monarchs	0	(0)
2026–	Tacoma Defiance	0	(0)
- * Club domestic league appearances and goals as of January 10, 2024

Jose Kevin Bonilla Zamora (born September 20, 2001) is an American soccer player who plays as a defender for MLS Next Pro side Tacoma Defiance.

== College career ==
In his first season with Portland, he only made one appearance, in a goalless draw against Loyola Marymount.

== Professional career ==
Bonilla made his professional debut on March 30, 2019, with North Texas SC in a USL League One match against the Chattanooga Red Wolves.

In 2023, he played with United PDX in USL League Two.

Bonilla was selected 18th overall in the 2024 MLS SuperDraft by Real Salt Lake and signed with the club on January 10, 2024. He suffered a knee injury during pre-season, requiring surgery, and causing him to miss the entire 2024 season. After the 2024 season, the club declined his option for the 2025 season.

== Personal life ==
Born in the United States, Bonilla is of Honduran descent and holds dual citizenship.
