= Álbaro Rudesindo =

Dominican Republic freestyle wrestler

Personal information
- Full name: Álbaro Rudesindo Camacho
- Born: 25 February 1997 (age 29)
- Height: 167 cm (5 ft 6 in)

Sport
- Country: Dominican Republic
- Sport: Amateur wrestling
- Weight class: 65 kg
- Event: Freestyle
Medal record
Men's freestyle wrestling
Representing Dominican Republic
Pan American Games
| Silver medal – second place | 2019 Lima | 65 kg |
Bolivarian Games
| Silver medal – second place | 2017 Santa Marta | 65 kg |
| Bronze medal – third place | 2022 Valledupar | 65 kg |
Pan American Championships
| Bronze medal – third place | 2018 Lima | 65 kg |
| Bronze medal – third place | 2021 Guatemala City | 65 kg |
| Bronze medal – third place | 2022 Acapulco | 65 kg |
Central American and Caribbean Games
| Bronze medal – third place | 2018 Barranquilla | 65 kg |

Álbaro Rudesindo Camacho (Note: In this Spanish name, the first or paternal surname is Rudesindo and the second or maternal family name is Camacho.) (born 25 February 1997) is a Dominican Republic freestyle wrestler. He won the silver medal in the 65 kg event at the 2019 Pan American Games held in Lima, Peru.

In 2020, he competed in the Pan American Olympic Qualification Tournament held in Ottawa, Canada without qualifying for the 2020 Summer Olympics in Tokyo, Japan. He also failed to qualify for the Olympics at the World Olympic Qualification Tournament held in Sofia, Bulgaria.

He won the bronze medal in his event at the 2022 Bolivarian Games held in Valledupar, Colombia.

In 2024, he competed at the Pan American Wrestling Olympic Qualification Tournament held in Acapulco, Mexico hoping to qualify for the 2024 Summer Olympics in Paris, France. He was eliminated in his second match.
