= Juan Rubelín Ramírez =

Dominican Republic freestyle wrestler

Personal information
- Full name: Juan Rubelín Ramírez Beltré
- Born: 15 August 1990 (age 36)

Sport
- Country: Dominican Republic
- Sport: Amateur wrestling
- Event: Freestyle
Medal record
Men's freestyle wrestling
Representing Dominican Republic
Pan American Games
Gold medal – first place	2011 Guadalajara	55 kg
Silver medal – second place	2019 Lima	57 kg
Bolivarian Games
Bronze medal – third place	2022 Valledupar	57 kg
Pan American Wrestling Championships
Bronze medal – third place	2020 Ottawa	57 kg

Juan Rubelín Ramírez Beltré (Note: In this Spanish name, the first or paternal surname is Ramírez and the second or maternal family name is Beltré.) (born 15 August 1990) is a Dominican Republic freestyle wrestler. He is a silver medalist at the Pan American Games and a bronze medalist at the Pan American Wrestling Championships.

== Career ==
In 2019, he won the silver medal in the 57 kg event at the Pan American Games held in Lima, Peru.

In March 2020, he won one of the bronze medals in the 57 kg event at the Pan American Wrestling Championships held in Ottawa, Canada. He also competed at the 2020 Pan American Wrestling Olympic Qualification Tournament, also held in Ottawa, Canada, without qualifying for the 2020 Summer Olympics in Tokyo, Japan. He also failed to qualify for the Olympics at the World Olympic Qualification Tournament held in Sofia, Bulgaria.

He won the bronze medal in his event at the 2022 Bolivarian Games held in Valledupar, Colombia.

== Achievements ==
Year	Tournament	Location	Result	Event
2011	Pan American Games	Guadalajara, Mexico	1st	Freestyle 55 kg
2019	Pan American Games	Lima, Peru	2nd	Freestyle 57 kg
2020	Pan American Wrestling Championships	Ottawa, Canada	3rd	Freestyle 57 kg
2022	Bolivarian Games	Valledupar, Colombia	3rd	Freestyle 57 kg
