= Nes Marie Rodríguez =

Puerto Rican freestyle wrestler

Personal information
- Full name: Nes Marie Rodríguez Tirado
- Born: 3 July 1992 (age 34) Caguas, Puerto Rico
- Height: 163 cm (5 ft 4 in)

Sport
- Country: Puerto Rico
- Sport: Amateur wrestling
- Event: Freestyle
Medal record
Women's freestyle wrestling
Representing Puerto Rico
Pan American Games
Bronze medal – third place	2019 Lima	57 kg
Central American and Caribbean Games
Silver medal – second place	2014 Veracruz	57 kg
Silver medal – second place	2018 Barranquilla	57 kg
Pan American Championships
Silver medal – second place	2017 Lauro de Freitas	60 kg
Silver medal – second place	2020 Ottawa	59 kg

Nes Marie Rodríguez Tirado (Note: In this Spanish name, the first or paternal surname is Rodríguez and the second or maternal family name is Tirado.) (born 3 July 1992) is a Puerto Rican freestyle wrestler. She won one of the bronze medals in the women's 57 kg event at the 2019 Pan American Games held in Lima, Peru.

== Career ==
In 2015, she competed in the women's freestyle 53 kg event at the World Wrestling Championships held in Las Vegas, United States where she was eliminated in her first match by Jong Myong-suk of North Korea.

At the 2020 Pan American Wrestling Championships held in Ottawa, Canada, she won the silver medal in the 59 kg event. In May 2021, she failed to qualify for the Olympics at the World Olympic Qualification Tournament held in Sofia, Bulgaria.

== Achievements ==
Year	Tournament	Location	Result	Event
2014	Central American and Caribbean Games	Veracruz, Mexico	2nd	Freestyle 57 kg
2017	Pan American Wrestling Championships	Lauro de Freitas, Brazil	2nd	Freestyle 60 kg
2018	Central American and Caribbean Games	Barranquilla, Colombia	2nd	Freestyle 57 kg
2019	Pan American Games	Lima, Peru	3rd	Freestyle 57 kg
2020	Pan American Wrestling Championships	Ottawa, Canada	2nd	Freestyle 59 kg
