= 2026 Pan American Wrestling Championships =

- Host city: Coralville, United States
- Dates: 7–10 May 2026

Champions
- Freestyle: United States
- Greco-Roman: United States
- Women: United States

The 2026 Pan American Wrestling Championships was held from 7 to 10 May in Coralville, United States.

== Medal summary ==
=== Men's freestyle ===
Event	Gold	Silver	Bronze
57 kg	Liam Cronin; United States	Darian Cruz; Puerto Rico	Pedro Mejías; Venezuela
57 kg	Liam Cronin; United States	Darian Cruz; Puerto Rico	Edwin Segura; Guatemala
61 kg	Austin DeSanto; United States	Caleb Smith; Puerto Rico	Garette Saunders; Canada
65 kg	Real Woods; United States	Peiman Biabani; Canada	Shannon Hanna; Bahamas
65 kg	Real Woods; United States	Peiman Biabani; Canada	Joey Silva; Puerto Rico
70 kg	Ridge Lovett; United States	Víctor Soto; Puerto Rico	Mike Zale; Canada
74 kg	Geannis Garzón; Cuba	Kannon Webster; United States	Adam Thomson; Canada
74 kg	Geannis Garzón; Cuba	Kannon Webster; United States	Ibsen Aguilar; Venezuela
79 kg	Levi Haines; United States	Mikey Labriola; Puerto Rico	Patrik Leder; Canada
86 kg	Zahid Valencia; United States	Chris Foca; Dominican Republic	Néstor Tafur; Colombia
86 kg	Zahid Valencia; United States	Chris Foca; Dominican Republic	Ethan Ramos; Puerto Rico
92 kg	Trent Hidlay; United States	Shane Jones; Puerto Rico	Andrew Johnson; Canada
97 kg	Arturo Silot; Cuba	Stephen Buchanan; United States	Luis Miguel Pérez; Dominican Republic
97 kg	Arturo Silot; Cuba	Stephen Buchanan; United States	Cristian Sarco; Venezuela
125 kg	Wyatt Hendrickson; United States	Jorawar Dhinsa; Canada	José Daniel Díaz; Venezuela
125 kg	Wyatt Hendrickson; United States	Jorawar Dhinsa; Canada	Gabriel Silva; Brazil

=== Men's Greco-Roman ===
Event	Gold	Silver	Bronze
55 kg	Max Nowry; United States	Isaac Marín; Mexico	Moisés Peralta; Ecuador
60 kg	Kevin de Armas; Cuba	Clisman Carracedo; Ecuador	Yerony Liria; Dominican Republic
60 kg	Kevin de Armas; Cuba	Clisman Carracedo; Ecuador	Pedro Rodrigues; Brazil
63 kg	Landon Drury; United States	Jeremy Peralta; Ecuador	Ángel Segura; Mexico
67 kg	Luis Orta; Cuba	Otto Black; United States	Julián Horta; Colombia
67 kg	Luis Orta; Cuba	Otto Black; United States	Nilton Soto; Peru
72 kg	Benji Peak; United States	Emerson Felipe; Guatemala	Mauri Silvério; Brazil
77 kg	Joel Adams; United States	Óscar Barrios; Honduras	Joílson Júnior; Brazil
77 kg	Joel Adams; United States	Óscar Barrios; Honduras	Eduardo Bernal; Chile
82 kg	Kamal Bey; United States	Diego Macías; Mexico	Not awarded as there were only 2 competitors.
87 kg	Beka Melelashvili; United States	Daniel Grégorich; Cuba	Luis Avendaño; Venezuela
97 kg	Gabriel Rosillo; Cuba	Kevin Mejía; Honduras	Timothy Young; United States
97 kg	Gabriel Rosillo; Cuba	Kevin Mejía; Honduras	Carlos Adames; Dominican Republic
130 kg	Cohlton Schultz; United States	Óscar Pino; Cuba	Guilherme Evangelista; Brazil
130 kg	Cohlton Schultz; United States	Óscar Pino; Cuba	James Ford; Puerto Rico

=== Women's freestyle ===
Event	Gold	Silver	Bronze
50 kg	Katie Gomez; United States	Jacqueline Mollocana; Ecuador	Madison Parks; Canada
50 kg	Katie Gomez; United States	Jacqueline Mollocana; Ecuador	Thalia Freitas; Brazil
53 kg	Lucía Yépez; Ecuador	Serena Di Benedetto; Canada	Cristelle Rodriguez; United States
53 kg	Lucía Yépez; Ecuador	Serena Di Benedetto; Canada	Sabrina Tapajós; Brazil
55 kg	Everest Leydecker; United States	Josefina Ramírez; Mexico	Amber Wiebe; Canada
57 kg	Amanda Martinez; United States	Luisa Valverde; Ecuador	Yaynelis Sanz; Cuba
57 kg	Amanda Martinez; United States	Luisa Valverde; Ecuador	Bertha Rojas; Mexico
59 kg	Abigail Nette; United States	Laurence Beauregard; Canada	Mayara Ramos; Brazil
62 kg	Adaugo Nwachukwu; United States	Melanie Jiménez; Mexico	Astrid Montero; Venezuela
65 kg	Kayla Miracle; United States	Miki Rowbottom; Canada	Alexis Gómez; Mexico
68 kg	Nathaly Grimán; Venezuela	Jasmine Robinson; United States	Virginia Jiménez; Chile
72 kg	Precious Wieser; United States	Ellise Daynes; Canada	Michelle Olea; Mexico
76 kg	Kylie Welker; United States	Génesis Reasco; Ecuador	Edna Jiménez; Mexico
76 kg	Kylie Welker; United States	Génesis Reasco; Ecuador	Milaimys Marín; Cuba

== Medal table ==
* Host nation (United States)

Rank	Nation	Gold	Silver	Bronze	Total
1	United States*	23	4	2	29
2	Cuba	5	2	2	9
3	Ecuador	1	5	1	7
4	Venezuela	1	0	6	7
5	Canada	0	6	7	13
6	Puerto Rico	0	5	3	8
7	Mexico	0	4	5	9
8	Honduras	0	2	0	2
9	Dominican Republic	0	1	3	4
10	Guatemala	0	1	1	2
11	Brazil	0	0	8	8
12	Chile	0	0	2	2
12	Colombia	0	0	2	2
14	Bahamas	0	0	1	1
14	Peru	0	0	1	1
Totals (15 entries)		30	30	44	104

== Team ranking ==
Rank	Men's freestyle		Men's Greco-Roman		Women's freestyle	
Rank	Team	Points	Team	Points	Team	Points
1	United States	240	United States	191	United States	235
2	Puerto Rico	150	Cuba	115	Canada	136
3	Canada	129	Brazil	99	Mexico	128
4	Venezuela	78	Mexico	77	Ecuador	85
5	Dominican Republic	71	Ecuador	57	Brazil	84
6	Mexico	62	Dominican Republic	52	Venezuela	70
7	Cuba	50	Peru	47	Colombia	42
8	Brazil	45	Venezuela	47	Cuba	36
9	Guatemala	36	Honduras	46	Chile	25
10	Jamaica	27	Guatemala	40	Dominican Republic	24

== Participating nations ==
222 wrestlers from 21 countries:

- Argentina (4)
- Bahamas (1)
- Barbados (2)
- Brazil (23)
- Canada (20)
- Chile (8)
- Colombia (10)
- Costa Rica (2)
- Cuba (10)
- Dominican Republic (13)
- Ecuador (10)
- Guatemala (6)
- Honduras (4)
- Jamaica (5)
- Mexico (27)
- Nicaragua (1)
- Panama (2)
- Paraguay (3)
- Peru (13)
- Puerto Rico (14)
- United States (30) (Host)
- Venezuela (17)

== Results ==
Legend

- F — Won by fall
- R — Retired
- WO — Won by walkover

=== Men's freestyle ===
==== Men's freestyle 57 kg ====
10 May

Round of 16
Pedro Mejías (VEN)	10
Christopher Merlo (CAN)	0
Edwin Segura (GUA)	11
Daniel Santos (BRA)	4
Omar Valenzuela (MEX)	2
Justin Rosales (NCA)	2^{F}

Quarterfinals
Darian Cruz (PUR)	4
Pedro Mejías (VEN)	1
Juan Rubelín Ramírez (DOM)	11
André Huarcaya (PER)	0
Liam Cronin (USA)	11
Edwin Segura (GUA)	0
Justin Rosales (NCA)	16
Guesseppe Rea (ECU)	6

Semifinals
Darian Cruz (PUR)	13
Juan Rubelín Ramírez (DOM)	11
Liam Cronin (USA)	12
Justin Rosales (NCA)	1

Final
Darian Cruz (PUR)	4
Liam Cronin (USA)	5

Bronze medal match
Pedro Mejías (VEN)	WO
Juan Rubelín Ramírez (DOM)
Edwin Segura (GUA)	8
Justin Rosales (NCA)	6

==== Men's freestyle 61 kg ====
9 May

Pos	Athlete	Pld	W	L	CP	TP	USA	CAN	JAM
1	Austin DeSanto (USA)	2	2	0	8	20	—	10–0	10–0
2	Garette Saunders (CAN)	2	1	1	4	14	0–4 SU	—	14–3
3	Irie Jackson (JAM)	2	0	2	1	3	0–4 SU	1–4 SU1	—

Source: UWW

Pos	Athlete	Pld	W	L	CP	TP	PUR	GUA	CRC
1	Caleb Smith (PUR)	2	2	0	8	21	—	10–0	11–0
2	Alex Vega (GUA)	2	1	1	3	14	0–4 SU	—	14–12
3	Peter Hammer (CRC)	2	0	2	1	12	0–4 SU	1–3 PO1	—

Source: UWW

Semifinals
Austin DeSanto (USA)	10
Alex Vega (GUA)	0
Caleb Smith (PUR)	10
Garette Saunders (CAN)	0

Final
Austin DeSanto (USA)	9
Caleb Smith (PUR)	0
Third place
Alex Vega (GUA)	5
Garette Saunders (CAN)	12

==== Men's freestyle 65 kg ====
10 May

Round of 16
Tommy García (DOM)	10
Matías Muñoz (CHI)	0
José Benites (PER)	2
Jordan Mitchell (JAM)	2
Wilfredo Rodríguez (VEN)	10
Matheus Barreto (BRA)	0
Joey Silva (PUR)	12
Zach Espalin (MEX)	3

Quarterfinals
Real Woods (USA)	14
Tommy García (DOM)	4
José Benites (PER)	0
Shannon Hanna (BAH)	10
Josh Kramer (ECU)	4
Wilfredo Rodríguez (VEN)	3
Joey Silva (PUR)	2
Peiman Biabani (CAN)	5

Semifinals
Real Woods (USA)	9
Shannon Hanna (BAH)	0
Josh Kramer (ECU)	0
Peiman Biabani (CAN)	10

Final
Real Woods (USA)	3
Peiman Biabani (CAN)	2

Bronze medal match
Tommy García (DOM)	3
Shannon Hanna (BAH)	7
Joey Silva (PUR)	5
Josh Kramer (ECU)	4

==== Men's freestyle 70 kg ====
10 May

Pos	Athlete	Pld	W	L	CP	TP	USA	CAN	MEX
1	Ridge Lovett (USA)	2	2	0	8	20	—	10–0	10–0
2	Mike Zale (CAN)	2	1	1	4	19	0–4 SU	—	19–8
3	Iván González (MEX)	2	0	2	1	8	0–4 SU	1–4 SU1	—

Source: UWW

Pos	Athlete	Pld	W	L	CP	TP	PUR	ARG	GUA
1	Víctor Soto (PUR)	2	2	0	8	32	—	18–8	14–1
2	Mauricio Lovera (ARG)	2	1	1	5	19	1–4 SU1	—	11–0
3	Brandon Hernández (GUA)	2	0	2	1	1	1–4 SU1	0–4 SU	—

Source: UWW

Semifinals
Ridge Lovett (USA)	WO
Mauricio Lovera (ARG)
Víctor Soto (PUR)	5^{F}
Mike Zale (CAN)	4

Final
Ridge Lovett (USA)	11^{F}
Víctor Soto (PUR)	0
Third place
Mauricio Lovera (ARG)
Mike Zale (CAN)	WO

==== Men's freestyle 74 kg ====
9 May

Round of 16
Julio Rodríguez (DOM)	8
Sixto Auccapiña (PER)	3
Raúl Palacios (MEX)	14
Jorge Gatica (CHI)	2
Kannon Webster (USA)	10
Arbey Alarcón (COL)	0
Luis Barrios (HON)	6
Renato da Silva (BRA)	0

Quarterfinals
Adam Thomson (CAN)	5
Julio Rodríguez (DOM)	3
Raúl Palacios (MEX)	0
Geannis Garzón (CUB)	10
Ibsen Aguilar (VEN)	1
Kannon Webster (USA)	12
Luis Barrios (HON)	11
Jonathan Parrilla (PUR)	0

Semifinals
Adam Thomson (CAN)	5
Geannis Garzón (CUB)	6
Kannon Webster (USA)	10
Luis Barrios (HON)	0

Final
Geannis Garzón (CUB)	12
Kannon Webster (USA)	6

Repechage round 1
Arbey Alarcón (COL)	0
Ibsen Aguilar (VEN)	5

Bronze medal match
Raúl Palacios (MEX)	0
Adam Thomson (CAN)	10
Ibsen Aguilar (VEN)	8
Luis Barrios (HON)	6

==== Men's freestyle 79 kg ====
10 May

Pos	Athlete	Pld	W	L	CP	TP	USA	PUR	CAN	COL	MEX
1	Levi Haines (USA)	4	4	0	16	44	—	11–0	13–2	10–0	10–0
2	Mikey Labriola (PUR)	4	3	1	13	31	0–4 SU	—	10–0	10–0	10–0 Fall
3	Patrik Leder (CAN)	4	2	2	10	12	1–4 SU1	0–4 SU	—	10–0	WO
4	Joan Serna (COL)	4	1	3	5	0	0–4 SU	0–4 SU	0–4 SU	—	WO
5	Sergio Espinoza (MEX)	4	0	4	0	0	0–4 SU	0–5 FA	0–5 IN	0–5 IN	—

Source: UWW

==== Men's freestyle 86 kg ====
9 May

Round of 16
Néstor Tafur (COL)	7
Kevin de León (MEX)	3
Taran Goring (CAN)	3
Ángel Cortés (PAN)	7
Jesús Landa (PER)	2
José Piñero (VEN)	4

Quarterfinals
Zahid Valencia (USA)	10
Néstor Tafur (COL)	0
Pedro Gonçalves (BRA)	4
Jesús Landa (PER)	2
Ethan Ramos (PUR)	10
Ángel Cortés (PAN)	0
José Piñero (VEN)	0
Chris Foca (DOM)	10

Semifinals
Zahid Valencia (USA)	11
Pedro Gonçalves (BRA)	0
Ethan Ramos (PUR)	8
Chris Foca (DOM)	10

Final
Zahid Valencia (USA)	10
Chris Foca (DOM)	0

Bronze medal match
Néstor Tafur (COL)	11
Pedro Gonçalves (BRA)	0
José Piñero (VEN)	0
Ethan Ramos (PUR)	10

==== Men's freestyle 92 kg ====
10 May

Pos	Athlete	Pld	W	L	CP	TP	USA	PUR	CAN	PER	BRA
1	Trent Hidlay (USA)	4	4	0	17	46	—	13–2 Fall	11–0	11–0	11–0
2	Shane Jones (PUR)	4	3	1	12	21	0–5 FA	—	8–2	WO	11–1
3	Andrew Johnson (CAN)	4	2	2	10	16	0–4 SU	1–3 PO1	—	4–1 Ret	10–0
4	Pool Ambrocio (PER)	4	1	3	3	5	0–4 SU	0–5 IN	0–5 IN	—	4–4
5	Lucas Alvan (BRA)	4	0	4	2	5	0–4 SU	1–4 SU1	0–4 SU	1–3 PO1	—

Source: UWW

==== Men's freestyle 97 kg ====
10 May

Round of 16
Edwin Morales (PUR)	10
Humberto Valverde (MEX)	0

Quarterfinals
Arturo Silot (CUB)	11
Edwin Morales (PUR)	0
Ailton Rocha (BRA)	0
Luis Miguel Pérez (DOM)	11
Cristian Sarco (VEN)	12^{F}
Nishan Randhawa (CAN)	3
Steven Burrell Jr. (JAM)	2
Stephen Buchanan (USA)	12

Semifinals
Arturo Silot (CUB)	10
Luis Miguel Pérez (DOM)	0
Cristian Sarco (VEN)	1
Stephen Buchanan (USA)	11

Final
Arturo Silot (CUB)	15
Stephen Buchanan (USA)	4

Bronze medal match
Edwin Morales (PUR)	3
Luis Miguel Pérez (DOM)	4
Steven Burrell Jr. (JAM)	5
Cristian Sarco (VEN)	6

==== Men's freestyle 125 kg ====
10 May

Round of 16
Elison Adames (DOM)	10
Maxwell Lacey (CRC)	0

Quarterfinals
Jonovan Smith (PUR)	5
Elison Adames (DOM)	0
José Daniel Díaz (VEN)	0
Jorawar Dhinsa (CAN)	9
Gabriel Silva (BRA)	8
Aaron Johnson (JAM)	0
Brandon Anguiano (MEX)	0
Wyatt Hendrickson (USA)	4^{F}

Semifinals
Jonovan Smith (PUR)	0
Jorawar Dhinsa (CAN)	4
Gabriel Silva (BRA)	0
Wyatt Hendrickson (USA)	10

Final
Jorawar Dhinsa (CAN)	4
Wyatt Hendrickson (USA)	12^{F}

Bronze medal match
José Daniel Díaz (VEN)	2
Jonovan Smith (PUR)	1
Brandon Anguiano (MEX)	0
Gabriel Silva (BRA)	4^{F}

=== Men's Greco-Roman ===
==== Men's Greco-Roman 55 kg ====
7 May

Pos	Athlete	Pld	W	L	CP	TP	USA	MEX	ECU	BRA
1	Max Nowry (USA)	3	3	0	12	26	—	8–0	10–1	8–0
2	Isaac Marín (MEX)	3	2	1	6	18	0–4 SU	—	12–12	6–1
3	Moisés Peralta (ECU)	3	1	2	5	19	1–4 SU1	1–3 PO1	—	6–2
4	Yan Landim (BRA)	3	0	3	2	3	0–4 SU	1–3 PO1	1–3 PO1	—

Source: UWW

==== Men's Greco-Roman 60 kg ====
7 May

Round of 16
Augusto Vargas (CHI)	1
Yerony Liria (DOM)	4
Clisman Carracedo (ECU)	4^{F}
Edrick Martínez (PUR)	0

Quarterfinals
Dalton Roberts (USA)	1
Yerony Liria (DOM)	3
Abel Sánchez (PER)	0
Kevin de Armas (CUB)	8
Pedro Rodrigues (BRA)	5
Alexis Rodríguez (MEX)	4
Clisman Carracedo (ECU)	10
Carlos Herrera (VEN)	0

Semifinals
Yerony Liria (DOM)	1
Kevin de Armas (CUB)	6
Pedro Rodrigues (BRA)	8
Clisman Carracedo (ECU)	11

Final
Kevin de Armas (CUB)	11
Clisman Carracedo (ECU)	1

Repechage round 1
Edrick Martínez (PUR)	0
Carlos Herrera (VEN)	8

Bronze medal match
Abel Sánchez (PER)	1
Yerony Liria (DOM)	10
Carlos Herrera (VEN)	3
Pedro Rodrigues (BRA)	5

==== Men's Greco-Roman 63 kg ====
7 May

Pos	Athlete	Pld	W	L	CP	TP	USA	ECU	MEX	BRA	PUR
1	Landon Drury (USA)	4	4	0	14	29	—	9–3	3–1	9–0	8–0
2	Jeremy Peralta (ECU)	4	3	1	14	31	1–3 PO1	—	9–0	8–0	11–4 Fall
3	Ángel Segura (MEX)	4	2	2	9	20	1–3 PO1	0–4 SU	—	11–2	8–0
4	Marat Garipov (BRA)	4	1	3	5	11	0–4 SU	0–4 SU	1–4 SU1	—	9–0
5	Derick Martínez (PUR)	4	0	4	0	4	0–4 SU	0–5 FA	0–4 SU	0–4 SU	—

Source: UWW

==== Men's Greco-Roman 67 kg ====
7 May

Round of 16
Yonaiker Martínez (VEN)	2
Julián Horta (COL)	7
Nilton Soto (PER)	4
Néstor Almanza (CHI)	2
Mauricio Lovera (ARG)	1
Irving Salazar (MEX)	9

Quarterfinals
Luis Orta (CUB)	9^{F}
Julián Horta (COL)	0
Alejandro Varela (GUA)	11
Ângelo Café (BRA)	2
Andrés Montaño (ECU)	1
Nilton Soto (PER)	2
Irving Salazar (MEX)	0
Otto Black (USA)	8

Semifinals
Luis Orta (CUB)	8
Alejandro Varela (GUA)	0
Nilton Soto (PER)	0
Otto Black (USA)	10

Final
Luis Orta (CUB)	5
Otto Black (USA)	3

Bronze medal match
Julián Horta (COL)	9
Alejandro Varela (GUA)	0
Irving Salazar (MEX)	5
Nilton Soto (PER)	5

==== Men's Greco-Roman 72 kg ====
8 May

Pos	Athlete	Pld	W	L	CP	TP	USA	GUA	BRA
1	Benji Peak (USA)	2	2	0	7	12	—	4–2	8–0
2	Emerson Felipe (GUA)	2	1	1	5	10	1–3 PO1	—	8–0
3	Mauri Silvério (BRA)	2	0	2	0	0	0–4 SU	0–4 SU	—

Source: UWW

==== Men's Greco-Roman 77 kg ====
7 May

Round of 16
Joílson Júnior (BRA)	7
Darfel Parada (VEN)	3

Quarterfinals
Joel Adams (USA)	5
Joílson Júnior (BRA)	2
Darío Cubas (PER)	2
David Choc (GUA)	10
Diego Martínez (MEX)	7
Eduardo Bernal (CHI)	2^{F}
Justin Boyce (BAR)	0
Óscar Barrios (HON)	10

Semifinals
Joel Adams (USA)	4
David Choc (GUA)	1
Eduardo Bernal (CHI)	0
Óscar Barrios (HON)	7

Final
Joel Adams (USA)	10
Óscar Barrios (HON)	1

Bronze medals
Joílson Júnior (BRA)	3
David Choc (GUA)	1
Justin Boyce (BAR)	0
Eduardo Bernal (CHI)	8

==== Men's Greco-Roman 82 kg ====
7 May

Pos	Athlete	Pld	W	L	CP	TP	ESP	BUL
1	Kamal Bey (USA)	1	1	0	4	9	—	9–1
2	Diego Macías (MEX)	1	0	1	1	1	1–4 SU1	—

Source: UWW

==== Men's Greco-Roman 87 kg ====
7 May

Pos	Athlete	Pld	W	L	CP	TP	VEN	DOM	PER	BRA
1	Luis Avendaño (VEN)	3	3	0	11	26	—	8–1	9–0	9–0
2	Johan Batista (DOM)	3	2	1	7	7	1–3 PO1	—	3–0	3–1
3	Carlos Espinoza (PER)	3	1	2	5	6	0–4 SU	0–3 PO	—	6–1 Fall
4	André Pinto (BRA)	3	0	3	1	2	0–4 SU	1–3 PO1	0–5 FA	—

Source: UWW

Pos	Athlete	Pld	W	L	CP	TP	USA	CUB	MEX
1	Beka Melelashvili (USA)	2	2	0	7	10	—	1–1	9–0
2	Daniel Grégorich (CUB)	2	1	1	5	9	1–3 PO1	—	8–0
3	José Andrés Vargas (MEX)	2	0	2	0	0	0–4 SU	0–4 SU	—

Source: UWW

Semifinals
Luis Avendaño (VEN)	1
Daniel Grégorich (CUB)	1
Beka Melelashvili (USA)	11
Johan Batista (DOM)	2

Final
Daniel Grégorich (CUB)	6
Beka Melelashvili (USA)	8
Bronze medal
Luis Avendaño (VEN)	WO
Johan Batista (DOM)

==== Men's Greco-Roman 97 kg ====
8 May

Round of 16
Jhonny Arias (COL)	9
Ronisson Brandão (BRA)	0
Carlos Adames (DOM)	4
Juan Díaz (VEN)	3

Quarterfinals
Gabriel Rosillo (CUB)	8
Jhonny Arias (COL)	0
Pool Ambrocio (PER)	2
Timothy Young (USA)	7
Ricardo Gómez (ARG)	0
Kevin Mejía (HON)	9
Carlos Adames (DOM)	WO
Dorian Trejo (MEX)

Semifinals
Gabriel Rosillo (CUB)	9
Timothy Young (USA)	1
Kevin Mejía (HON)	8
Carlos Adames (DOM)	0

Final
Gabriel Rosillo (CUB)	6^{F}
Kevin Mejía (HON)	2

Bronze medal match
Jhonny Arias (COL)	2
Timothy Young (USA)	7
Ricardo Gómez (ARG)	11
Carlos Adames (DOM)	12

==== Men's Greco-Roman 130 kg ====
7 May

Round of 16
Guilherme Evangelista (BRA)	11
Gino Ávila (HON)	6

Quarterfinals
Cohlton Schultz (USA)	8
Guilherme Evangelista (BRA)	0
Tyrece Thompson (JAM)	0
Yasmani Acosta (CHI)	0^{R}
Luis López (MEX)	6
James Ford (PUR)	7
José Núñez (DOM)	0
Óscar Pino (CUB)	9

Semifinals
Cohlton Schultz (USA)	8
Tyrece Thompson (JAM)	0
James Ford (PUR)	0
Óscar Pino (CUB)	8

Final
Cohlton Schultz (USA)	1
Óscar Pino (CUB)	1

Bronze medals
Guilherme Evangelista (BRA)	4^{F}
Tyrece Thompson (JAM)	0
José Núñez (DOM)	1
James Ford (PUR)	6^{F}

=== Women's freestyle ===
==== Women's freestyle 50 kg ====
8 May

Round of 16
Mercedes Castillo (MEX)	5
Greili Bencosme (CUB)	5

Quarterfinals
Madison Parks (CAN)	6
Mercedes Castillo (MEX)	0
Nathaly Herrera (PER)	2
Jacqueline Mollocana (ECU)	9^{F}
Thalia Freitas (BRA)	0
Katie Gomez (USA)	10
Dannia Figueroa (COL)
Nohalis Loyo (VEN)	WO

Semifinals
Madison Parks (CAN)	6
Jacqueline Mollocana (ECU)	8
Katie Gomez (USA)	6
Nohalis Loyo (VEN)	2

Final
Jacqueline Mollocana (ECU)	3
Katie Gomez (USA)	5

Bronze medal match
Nathaly Herrera (PER)	0
Madison Parks (CAN)	8
Thalia Freitas (BRA)	7
Nohalis Loyo (VEN)	6

==== Women's freestyle 53 kg ====
9 May

Round of 16
Cristelle Rodriguez (USA)	10
Sofia Ocegueda (MEX)	0
Antonia Valdés (CHI)	11
Yusneiry Agrazal (PAN)	4
Ana Lucía Álvarez (PER)	0
Sabrina Tapajós (BRA)	9

Quarterfinals
Lucía Yépez (ECU)	11
Cristelle Rodriguez (USA)	0
Alexa Álvarez (VEN)	4^{F}
Aneishka Santos (PUR)	0
Serena Di Benedetto (CAN)	9
Antonia Valdés (CHI)	4
Sabrina Tapajós (BRA)	10
María González (DOM)	4

Semifinals
Lucía Yépez (ECU)	12
Alexa Álvarez (VEN)	2
Serena Di Benedetto (CAN)	8^{F}
Sabrina Tapajós (BRA)	0

Final
Lucía Yépez (ECU)	13
Serena Di Benedetto (CAN)	2

Bronze medal match
Cristelle Rodriguez (USA)	7
Alexa Álvarez (VEN)	2
Antonia Valdés (CHI)	2
Sabrina Tapajós (BRA)	8

==== Women's freestyle 55 kg ====
8 May

Pos	Athlete	Pld	W	L	CP	TP	USA	MEX	CAN
1	Everest Leydecker (USA)	2	2	0	8	21	—	11–0	10–0
2	Josefina Ramírez (MEX)	2	1	1	5	8	0–4 SU	—	8–14 Fall
3	Amber Wiebe (CAN)	2	0	2	0	14	0–4 SU	0–5 FA	—

Source: UWW

==== Women's freestyle 57 kg ====
8 May

Round of 16
Karla Godinez (CAN)	0
Yaynelis Sanz (CUB)	8
María Fuentes (VEN)	0
Tatiana Hurtado (COL)	10
Yocleidy Ramírez (DOM)	4
Nadia Trujillano (PER)	0

Quarterfinals
Luisa Valverde (ECU)	4^{F}
Yaynelis Sanz (CUB)	0
Camila Amarilla (ARG)	3
Giullia Penalber (BRA)	6
Bertha Rojas (MEX)	12
Tatiana Hurtado (COL)	4
Yocleidy Ramírez (DOM)	0
Amanda Martinez (USA)	8^{F}

Semifinals
Luisa Valverde (ECU)	4
Giullia Penalber (BRA)	1
Bertha Rojas (MEX)	5
Amanda Martinez (USA)	10

Final
Luisa Valverde (ECU)	1
Amanda Martinez (USA)	6

Bronze medals
Yaynelis Sanz (CUB)	4
Giullia Penalber (BRA)	0
Yocleidy Ramírez (DOM)	2
Bertha Rojas (MEX)	5

==== Women's freestyle 59 kg ====
9 May

Pos	Athlete	Pld	W	L	CP	TP	USA	CAN	BRA	MEX
1	Abigail Nette (USA)	3	3	0	14	28	—	12–2	8–4 Fall	8–0 Fall
2	Laurence Beauregard (CAN)	3	2	1	10	12	1–4 SU1	—	10–0	WO
3	Mayara Ramos (BRA)	3	1	2	4	14	0–5 FA	0–4 SU	—	10–0
4	Daniela Martínez (MEX)	3	0	3	0	0	0–5 FA	0–5 IN	0–4 SU	—

Source: UWW

==== Women's freestyle 62 kg ====
8 May

Pos	Athlete	Pld	W	L	CP	TP	USA	MEX	BAR
1	Adaugo Nwachukwu (USA)	2	2	0	8	12	—	8–1	4–0 Fall
2	Melanie Jiménez (MEX)	2	1	1	6	7	1–3 PO1	—	6–0 Fall
3	Rebecca Williams (BAR)	2	0	2	0	0	0–5 FA	0–5 FA	—

Source: UWW

Pos	Athlete	Pld	W	L	CP	TP	VEN	BRA	CAN	COL
1	Astrid Montero (VEN)	3	3	0	12	18	—	4–1	4–0 Fall	10–0
2	Laís Nunes (BRA)	3	2	1	8	17	1–3 PO1	—	10–0	6–0
3	Annika Fines (CAN)	3	1	2	5	9	0–5 FA	0–4 SU	—	9–0 Fall
4	Paula Montoya (COL)	3	0	3	0	0	0–4 SU	0–3 PO	0–5 FA	—

Source: UWW

Semifinals
Adaugo Nwachukwu (USA)	9
Laís Nunes (BRA)	0
Astrid Montero (VEN)	1
Melanie Jiménez (MEX)	3

Final
Adaugo Nwachukwu (USA)	3
Melanie Jiménez (MEX)	1
Bronze medal
Laís Nunes (BRA)	1
Astrid Montero (VEN)	2

==== Women's freestyle 65 kg ====
9 May

Pos	Athlete	Pld	W	L	CP	TP	USA	CAN	MEX
1	Kayla Miracle (USA)	2	2	0	8	20	—	10–0	10–0
2	Miki Rowbottom (CAN)	2	1	1	3	6	0–4 SU	—	6–4
3	Alexis Gómez (MEX)	2	0	2	1	4	0–4 SU	1–3 PO1	—

Source: UWW

==== Women's freestyle 68 kg ====
8 May

Pos	Athlete	Pld	W	L	CP	TP	USA	COL	CAN	BRA
1	Jasmine Robinson (USA)	3	3	0	12	33	—	10–0	12–1	11–1
2	María Ceballos (COL)	3	2	1	6	14	0–4 SU	—	8–3	6–2
3	Aleah Nickel (CAN)	3	1	2	7	10	1–4 SU1	1–3 PO1	—	6–0 Fall
4	Eduarda Rodrigues (BRA)	3	0	3	2	3	1–4 SU1	1–3 PO1	0–5 FA	—

Source: UWW

Pos	Athlete	Pld	W	L	CP	TP	VEN	CHI	MEX
1	Nathaly Grimán (VEN)	2	2	0	6	13	—	6–1	7–1
2	Virginia Jiménez (CHI)	2	1	1	6	7	1–3 PO1	—	6–1 Fall
3	Ámbar Garnica (MEX)	2	0	2	1	2	1–3 PO1	0–5 FA	—

Source: UWW

Semifinals
Jasmine Robinson (USA)	11
Virginia Jiménez (CHI)	0
Nathaly Grimán (VEN)	4
María Ceballos (COL)	2

Final
Jasmine Robinson (USA)	6
Nathaly Grimán (VEN)	6
Bronze medal
Virginia Jiménez (CHI)	9
María Ceballos (COL)	0

==== Women's freestyle 72 kg ====
8 May

Pos	Athlete	Pld	W	L	CP	TP	USA	CAN	MEX
1	Precious Bell (USA)	2	2	0	9	20	—	10–0	10–0 Fall
2	Ellise Daynes (CAN)	2	1	1	5	6	0–4 SU	—	6–4 Fall
3	Michelle Olea (MEX)	2	0	2	0	4	0–5 FA	0–5 FA	—

Source: UWW

==== Women's freestyle 76 kg ====
9 May

Round of 16
Emelyn Bautista (DOM)	4
Edna Jiménez (MEX)	5
Aomi Riques (PER)	0
Meiriele Hora (BRA)	10

Quarterfinals
Génesis Reasco (ECU)	15
Edna Jiménez (MEX)	4
Neirili Banguero (VEN)	4
Vianne Rouleau (CAN)	1
Kylie Welker (USA)	11
Tatiana Rentería (COL)	0
Meiriele Hora (BRA)	2
Milaimys Marín (CUB)	12

Semifinals
Génesis Reasco (ECU)	4
Neirili Banguero (VEN)	0
Kylie Welker (USA)	11^{F}
Milaimys Marín (CUB)	0

Final
Génesis Reasco (ECU)	0
Kylie Welker (USA)	3^{F}

Bronze medals
Edna Jiménez (MEX)	9
Neirili Banguero (VEN)	5
Tatiana Rentería (COL)	0
Milaimys Marín (CUB)	7
