= Wrestling at the 2023 Central American and Caribbean Games =

- Venue: Cuna Del Mágico
- Location: (El Salvador) San Salvador
- Dates: 26–28 June

The wrestling competition at the 2023 Central American and Caribbean Games was held in San Salvador, El Salvador from 26 to 28 June at Cuna Del Mágico.

== Medal table ==
* Host nation (El Salvador)

Rank	Nation	Gold	Silver	Bronze	Total
1	Cuba (CUB)	15	0	3	18
2	Venezuela (VEN)	2	2	8	12
3	Colombia (COL)	1	3	4	8
4	Mexico (MEX)	0	6	8	14
5	Puerto Rico (PUR)	0	3	3	6
6	Dominican Republic (DOM)	0	3	2	5
7	Costa Rica (CRC)	0	1	0	1
8	Panama (PAN)	0	0	3	3
9	Honduras (HON)	0	0	2	2
10	El Salvador (ESA)*	0	0	1	1
10	Jamaica (JAM)	0	0	1	1
Totals (11 entries)		18	18	35	71

== Medal summary ==
=== Men's freestyle ===
Event	Gold	Silver	Bronze
57 kg	Osmany Diversent (CUB)	Juan Ramírez (DOM)	Jacob Moran (PUR)
65 kg	Alejandro Valdés (CUB)	Sebastian Rivera (PUR)	Uber Cuero (COL) Cristian Santiago (MEX)
74 kg	Anthony Montero (VEN)	Julio Rodríguez (DOM)	Franklin Maren (CUB) Franklin Gómez (PUR)
86 kg	Yurieski Torreblanca (CUB)	Carlos Izquierdo (COL)	Ethan Ramos (PUR) Pedro Ceballos (VEN)
97 kg	Arturo Silot (CUB)	Maxwell Lacey (CRC)	Pedro Garay (MEX) Luis Miguel Pérez (DOM)
125 kg	Jose Diaz (VEN)	Jonovan Smith (PUR)	Aaron Johnson (JAM) Ibrahim Torres (CUB)

=== Men's Greco-Roman ===
Event	Gold	Silver	Bronze
60 kg	Kevin de Armas (CUB)	Samuel Gurria (MEX)	Raiber Rodríguez (VEN) Robert Pérez (PAN)
67 kg	Luis Orta (CUB)	Leomar Cordero (VEN)	Edsson Olmos (MEX) Julián Horta (COL)
77 kg	Yosvanys Pena (CUB)	Emmanuel Benítez (MEX)	Jair Cuero (COL) Alvis Almendra (PAN)
87 kg	Daniel Gregorich (CUB)	Carlos Muñoz (COL)	Daniel Vicente (MEX) Luis Avendaño (VEN)
97 kg	Gabriel Rosillo (CUB)	Carlos Adames (DOM)	Luis López (MEX) Kevin Mejía (HON)
130 kg	Oscar Pino (CUB)	Edgardo López (PUR)	Moises Pérez (VEN) Paul Morales (MEX)

=== Women's freestyle ===
Event	Gold	Silver	Bronze
50 kg	Yusneylys Guzmán (CUB)	Mariana Diaz (MEX)	Mariana Rojas (VEN) Alisson Cardozo (COL)
53 kg	Laura Herin (CUB)	Karla Acosta (MEX)	Betzabeth Argüello (VEN) María González (DOM)
57 kg	Ángela Álvarez (CUB)	Susana Lozano (MEX)	Betzabeth Sarco (VEN) Brenda Bailey (HON)
62 kg	María Santana (CUB)	Alexis Gomez (MEX)	Ashley Zarate (PAN) Astrid Montero (VEN)
68 kg	Hangelen Yanes (CUB)	Nicoll Parrado (COL)	Josselyn Portillo (ESA) Ámbar Garnica (MEX)
76 kg	Tatiana Rentería (COL)	María Acosta (VEN)	Milaimys Marín (CUB) Atzimba Landaverde (MEX)
