= Wrestling at the 2023 Pan American Games – Men's freestyle 97 kg =

Men's Freestyle 97 kg at the 2023 Pan American Games
- Venue: Olympic Training Center in Ñuñoa
- Dates: November 2
- Competitors: 9 from 9 nations

Medalists
Gold medal	Kyle Snyder	United States
Silver medal	Arturo Silot	Cuba
Bronze medal	Nishan Randhawa	Canada
Bronze medal	Cristian Sarco	Venezuela

The men's freestyle 97 kg competition of the Wrestling events at the 2023 Pan American Games in Ñuñoa was held on November 2.

== Qualification ==
The winner of each weight category at the 2021 Junior Pan American Games in Cali, Colombia qualified directly, along with the top four at the 2022 Pan American Wrestling Championships and 2023 Pan American Wrestling Championships. The host country (Chile) is guaranteed a spot in each event, but its athletes must compete in both the 2022 and 2023 Pan American Championship. If Chile does not qualify at any of the first two events, it will take the fourth spot available at the 2023 Pan American Championships. A further six wildcards (four men and two women) will be awarded to nations without any qualified athlete but took part in the qualification tournaments.

== Schedule ==
All times are local (UTC−3)

Date	Time	Event
Wednesday, 1 November 2023	10:00	Round of 16
Wednesday, 1 November 2023	10:00	Quarterfinals
Wednesday, 1 November 2023	11:00	Semifinals
Wednesday, 1 November 2023	17:00	Finals

== Results ==
Legend

- F — Won by fall

=== Main Bracket ===
Round of 16
Ricardo Báez (ARG)	4
Nishan Randhawa (CAN)	14

Quarterfinals
Kyle Snyder (USA)	10
Nishan Randhawa (CAN)	0
Luis Miguel Pérez (DOM)	6
Maxwell Lacey (CRC)	8^{F}
Matías Uribe (CHI)	0
Arturo Silot (CUB)	11
Cristian Sarco (VEN)	12
Carlos Angulo (COL)	1

Semifinals
Kyle Snyder (USA)	10
Maxwell Lacey (CRC)	0
Arturo Silot (CUB)	5
Cristian Sarco (VEN)	0

Finals
Kyle Snyder (USA)	14
Arturo Silot (CUB)	4

=== Repechage ===
Bronze medal match
Nishan Randhawa (CAN)	7
Maxwell Lacey (CRC)	6
Matías Uribe (CHI)	0
Cristian Sarco (VEN)	10

== Final standing ==
Rank	Athlete
1st place, gold medalist(s)	Kyle Snyder (USA)
2nd place, silver medalist(s)	Arturo Silot (CUB)
3rd place, bronze medalist(s)	Nishan Randhawa (CAN)
3rd place, bronze medalist(s)	Cristian Sarco (VEN)
5	Maxwell Lacey (CRC)
5	Matías Uribe (CHI)
7	Luis Miguel Pérez (DOM)
9	Ricardo Báez (ARG)
11	Carlos Angulo (COL)
