= Wrestling at the 2026 Central American and Caribbean Games =

- Venue: Centro Olímpico Juan Pablo Duarte
- Location: Santo Domingo, Dominican Republic
- Start date: 31 July 2026
- End date: 2 August 2026

The wrestling competition at the 2026 Central American and Caribbean Games was held in Santo Domingo, Dominican Republic, from 31 July to 2 August 2026 at the Centro Olímpico Juan Pablo Duarte.

== Medal table ==
* Host nation (Dominican Republic)

Rank	Nation	Gold	Silver	Bronze	Total
1	Cuba (CUB)	10	0	5	15
2	Venezuela (VEN)	3	4	7	14
3	Mexico (MEX)	1	5	3	9
4	Dominican Republic (DOM)*	1	3	4	8
5	Colombia (COL)	1	2	4	7
5	Puerto Rico (PUR)	1	2	4	7
7	Honduras (HON)	1	1	1	3
8	Bahamas (BAH)	0	1	0	1
9	Guatemala (GUA)	0	0	2	2
9	Panama (PAN)	0	0	2	2
Totals (10 entries)		18	18	32	68

== Medal summary ==
=== Men's Greco-Roman ===
Event	Gold	Silver	Bronze
60 kg	Kevin de Armas; Cuba	Yerony Liria; Dominican Republic	Raiber Rodríguez; Venezuela
60 kg	Kevin de Armas; Cuba	Yerony Liria; Dominican Republic	Andrés González; Panama
67 kg	Yonat Veliz; Cuba	Carlos González; Colombia	José Varela; Guatemala
67 kg	Yonat Veliz; Cuba	Carlos González; Colombia	Jonathan Elisee; Dominican Republic
77 kg	Jair Cuero; Colombia	Lui Medinas; Venezuela	Emmanuel Benítez; Mexico
77 kg	Jair Cuero; Colombia	Lui Medinas; Venezuela	David Choc; Guatemala
87 kg	Daniel Grégorich; Cuba	Johan Batista; Dominican Republic	Luis Avendaño; Venezuela
87 kg	Daniel Grégorich; Cuba	Johan Batista; Dominican Republic	Alek Ortiz; Puerto Rico
97 kg	Kevin Mejía; Honduras	Carlos Adames; Dominican Republic	Gabriel Rosillo; Cuba
97 kg	Kevin Mejía; Honduras	Carlos Adames; Dominican Republic	Juan Díaz; Venezuela
130 kg	Óscar Pino; Cuba	Gino Ávila; Honduras	Moisés Pérez; Venezuela
130 kg	Óscar Pino; Cuba	Gino Ávila; Honduras	James Ford III; Puerto Rico

=== Men's freestyle ===
Event	Gold	Silver	Bronze
57 kg	Roman Bravo-Young; Mexico	Darian Cruz; Puerto Rico	Pedro Mejías; Venezuela
65 kg	Joseph Andrés Silva; Puerto Rico	Shannon Hanna II; Bahamas	Carlos Méndez; Cuba
65 kg	Joseph Andrés Silva; Puerto Rico	Shannon Hanna II; Bahamas	Zachary Espalin; Mexico
74 kg	Geannis Garzón; Cuba	Ibsen Aguilar; Venezuela	Julio Rodríguez; Dominican Republic
74 kg	Geannis Garzón; Cuba	Ibsen Aguilar; Venezuela	Luis Barrios; Honduras
86 kg	Christopher Foca; Dominican Republic	Kevin de León; Mexico	Lázaro Hernández; Cuba
97 kg	Arturo Silot; Cuba	Carlos Izquierdo; Colombia	Luis Miguel Pérez; Dominican Republic
125 kg	José Daniel Díaz; Venezuela	Jonovan Smith; Puerto Rico	Yosenki Castañeda; Cuba
125 kg	José Daniel Díaz; Venezuela	Jonovan Smith; Puerto Rico	Elison Adames; Dominican Republic

=== Women's freestyle ===
Event	Gold	Silver	Bronze
50 kg	Greili Bencosme; Cuba	Mercedes Castillo; Mexico	Nohalis Loyo; Venezuela
50 kg	Greili Bencosme; Cuba	Mercedes Castillo; Mexico	Yorlenis Morán; Panama
53 kg	Laura Herin; Cuba	Alexa Álvarez; Venezuela	Karla Acosta; Mexico
53 kg	Laura Herin; Cuba	Alexa Álvarez; Venezuela	Yusmy Chaparro; Colombia
57 kg	Yaynelis Sanz; Cuba	Bertha Rojas; Mexico	Tatiana Hurtado; Colombia
57 kg	Yaynelis Sanz; Cuba	Bertha Rojas; Mexico	Yohelyn Valera; Venezuela
62 kg	Astrid Montero; Venezuela	Melanie Jiménez; Mexico	Katherine Rentería; Colombia
62 kg	Astrid Montero; Venezuela	Melanie Jiménez; Mexico	María Santana; Cuba
68 kg	Nathaly Grimán; Venezuela	Ámbar Garnica; Mexico	Nicoll Parrado; Colombia
68 kg	Nathaly Grimán; Venezuela	Ámbar Garnica; Mexico	Ruth Jiménez; Puerto Rico
76 kg	Milaimys Marín; Cuba	María Acosta; Venezuela	Paola Rodríguez; Puerto Rico
