= Arturo Silot =

Cuban freestyle wrestler

Personal information
- Full name: Arturo Silot Torres
- National team: Cuba
- Born: April 13, 2001 (age 25) Santiago de Cuba, Cuba
- Weight: 97 kg (214 lb)

Sport
- Country: Cuba
- Sport: Amateur wrestling
- Weight class: 97 kg
- Event: Freestyle
Medal record
Men's freestyle wrestling
Representing Cuba
Pan American Games
Silver medal – second place	2023 Santiago	97 kg
Pan American Championships
Gold medal – first place	2026 Coralville	97 kg
Silver medal – second place	2025 Monterrey	97 kg
Silver medal – second place	2024 Acapulco	97 kg
Silver medal – second place	2023 Buenos Aires	97 kg
Silver medal – second place	2022 Acapulco	97 kg
Central American and Caribbean Games
Gold medal – first place	2023 San Salvador	97 kg
Gold medal – first place	2026 Santo Domingo	97 kg
Junior Pan American Games
Gold medal – first place	2021 Cali	97 kg
Junior Pan American Championships
Gold medal – first place	2021 Oaxtepec	97 kg
Silver medal – second place	2019 Guatemala City	86 kg

Arturo Silot Torres (born 13 April 2001) is a Cuban freestyle wrestler who claimed the silver medal at the 2022 Pan American Championships and the gold medal from the 2021 Junior Pan American Games.

Silot won the gold medal in the men's 97 kg event at the 2021 Junior Pan American Games held in Cali, Colombia. As a result, he directly qualified to compete in the men's 97 kg event at the 2023 Pan American Games in Santiago, Chile.

He won the silver medal in men's 97 kg event at the 2023 Pan American Games held in Santiago, Chile.

In 2024, at the Pan American Wrestling Olympic Qualification Tournament held in Acapulco, Mexico, he earned a quota place for Cuba for the 2024 Summer Olympics held in Paris, France. He competed in the men's freestyle 97 kg event at the Olympics.
