= 2022 U20 Pan American Wrestling Championships =

- Host city: Oaxtepec, Mexico
- Dates: 8–10 July 2022

Champions
- Freestyle: United States
- Greco-Roman: United States
- Women: United States

The 2022 U20 Pan American Wrestling Championships was held from 8 to 10 July in Oaxtepec, Mexico.

== Medal summary ==
=== Men's freestyle ===
Event	Gold	Silver	Bronze
57 kg	Andre Gonzales; United States	Enrique Herrera; Peru	Hernan Almendra; Argentina
57 kg	Andre Gonzales; United States	Enrique Herrera; Peru	Treye Trotman; Canada
61 kg	Nicholas Bouzakis; United States	William Betancourt; Puerto Rico	Gavin Eldridge; Canada
65 kg	Robert Cornella; United States	Erick Barroso Bautista; Mexico	Dom Martins Ferreira; Brazil
65 kg	Robert Cornella; United States	Erick Barroso Bautista; Mexico	Gregor Mcneil; Canada
70 kg	Mitchell Mesenbrink; United States	William Oyola; Argentina	Royglen Temple Batista; Panama
70 kg	Mitchell Mesenbrink; United States	William Oyola; Argentina	Cesar Escamilla Menchaca; Mexico
74 kg	Alexander Facundo; United States	Alexander Cusinga Gomez; Peru	Amaan Gulacha; Canada
74 kg	Alexander Facundo; United States	Alexander Cusinga Gomez; Peru	Lautaro Seghesso; Argentina
79 kg	Luca Augustine; United States	Guilherme Barros de Arruda Porto; Brazil	Connor Church; Canada
86 kg	Samuel Fisher; United States	Jhon Sanchez Solis; Ecuador	Jose Cano Lopez; Mexico
86 kg	Samuel Fisher; United States	Jhon Sanchez Solis; Ecuador	Cesar Ubico Estrada; Guatemala
92 kg	Jaxon Smith; United States	Juan Iturriza Ruiz; Mexico	Karanpreet Gill; Canada
97 kg	Benjamin Kueter; United States	Samuel Pereira; Canada	Adrian Zapata Jacobo; Mexico
125 kg	Nicholas Feldman; United States	Roger Li; Canada	Jhoan Ocoro; Colombia

=== Men's Greco-Roman ===
Event	Gold	Silver	Bronze
55 kg	Hernan Almendra; Argentina	Marco Garcia Alvarez; Mexico	Jakason Burks; United States
60 kg	Ronaldo Sánchez; Colombia	Jeremy Peralta Gonzalez; Ecuador	Maxwell Black; United States
60 kg	Ronaldo Sánchez; Colombia	Jeremy Peralta Gonzalez; Ecuador	Edwin Allain Miranda; Peru
63 kg	Haiden Drury; United States	Antonio Ruiz Mora; Ecuador	Marco Fernandez Cubas; Peru
67 kg	Nestor Almanza Truyol; Chile	Robert Perez III; United States	Royglen Temple Batista; Panama
67 kg	Nestor Almanza Truyol; Chile	Robert Perez III; United States	Uvaldo Camacho Diaz; Mexico
72 kg	Richard Fedalen; United States	Elsi Martinez Ordonez; Mexico	Lautaro Seghesso; Argentina
77 kg	Guilherme Barros de Arruda Porto; Brazil	Manuel Gaitan III; United States	Diego Macias Torres; Mexico
82 kg	Michael Altomer; United States	Christian Medina Nunez; Mexico	Juan Cardozo; Colombia
87 kg	Kodiak Stephens; United States	Ricardo Gomez; Argentina	Carlos Salazar Gomez; Mexico
97 kg	Robert Plympton; United States	Juan Herrera de la Rosa; Mexico	Jean Paul Nazareno; Ecuador
130 kg	Aden Attao; United States	Luis de la Rosa Arteaga; Mexico	Not awarded

=== Women ===
Event	Gold	Silver	Bronze
50 kg	Sage Mortimer; United States	Yorlenis Moran Sanchez; Panama	Serena Di Benedetto; Canada
50 kg	Sage Mortimer; United States	Yorlenis Moran Sanchez; Panama	Shammilka Miranda Diaz; Puerto Rico
53 kg	Nathaly Herrera Huacre; Peru	Estrella Dorado Marin; United States	Grecia Bernal Betancourt; Mexico
55 kg	Angie Zea Alvarado; Peru	Andrea Avelino Barrientos; Mexico	Robbie Pingal; Canada
57 kg	Bertha Rojas Chavez; Mexico	Leonela Gruezo Ortiz; Ecuador	Camila Amarilla; Argentina
59 kg	Nanea Estrella; United States	Mia Friesen; Canada	Tatiana Hurtado; Colombia
62 kg	Skylar Hattendorf; United States	Maria Mendez Aguilar; Mexico	Angelina Ellis Toddington; Canada
65 kg	Melanie Jimenez Villalba; Mexico	Elleni Johnson; United States	Savana Pinsent; Canada
68 kg	Nicoll Parrado; Colombia	Tiera Jimerson; United States	Sandra Escamilla Menchaca; Mexico
72 kg	Ximena Rodríguez; Mexico	Nyla Burgess; Canada	Haley Ward; United States
76 kg	Vianne Rouleau; Canada	Ana Dos Santos; Brazil	Rose Cassioppi; United States

== Medal table ==
* Host nation (Mexico)

Rank	Nation	Gold	Silver	Bronze	Total
1	United States	19	5	4	28
2	Mexico*	3	9	8	20
3	Peru	2	2	2	6
4	Colombia	2	0	3	5
5	Canada	1	4	10	15
6	Argentina	1	2	4	7
7	Brazil	1	2	1	4
8	Chile	1	0	0	1
9	Ecuador	0	4	1	5
10	Panama	0	1	2	3
11	Puerto Rico	0	1	1	2
12	Guatemala	0	0	1	1
Totals (12 entries)		30	30	37	97

== Team ranking ==
Rank	Men's freestyle		Men's Greco-Roman		Women's freestyle	
Rank	Team	Points	Team	Points	Team	Points
1	United States	250	United States	220	United States	189
2	Canada	140	Mexico	165	Mexico	177
3	Mexico	129	Ecuador	85	Canada	159
4	Ecuador	71	Argentina	68	Peru	70
5	Peru	70	Brazil	60	Brazil	58
6	Brazil	61	Peru	58	Chile	41
7	Argentina	56	Colombia	50	Colombia	40
8	Panama	45	Panama	46	Ecuador	30
9	Puerto Rico	44	Chile	45	Panama	20
10	Guatemala	33	Puerto Rico	37	El Salvador	18
11	Colombia	27			Argentina Puerto Rico	15
12	Chile	16			—N/a	
13					Costa Rica	6
