= Wrestling at the 2021 Junior Pan American Games =

- Wrestling pictogram
- Venue: Hockey Miguel Calero Arena
- Dates: 1–4 December
- Competitors: 145 from 22 nations

Wrestling competitions at the 2021 Junior Pan American Games in Cali, Colombia were held from December 1–4, 2021.

The winner of each weight category qualified for the 2023 Pan American Games.

== Medal summary ==
=== Medal table ===
* Host nation (Colombia)

Rank	Nation	Gold	Silver	Bronze	Total
1	Cuba	9	3	3	15
2	United States	4	2	6	12
3	Colombia*	2	1	4	7
4	Venezuela	1	1	7	9
5	Brazil	1	0	3	4
6	Ecuador	1	0	1	2
7	Mexico	0	6	6	12
8	Peru	0	2	1	3
9	Dominican Republic	0	1	2	3
10	Argentina	0	1	0	1
10	Guatemala	0	1	0	1
12	Panama	0	0	2	2
13	Chile	0	0	1	1
Totals (13 entries)		18	18	36	72

== Medalists ==
=== Men's freestyle ===
Event	Gold	Silver	Bronze
57 kg	Osmany Martínez; Cuba	Enrique Herrera; Peru	Richard Figueroa II; United States
57 kg	Osmany Martínez; Cuba	Enrique Herrera; Peru	Erick Uriel Barroso; Mexico
65 kg	Lukas Chittum; United States	Hector González; Mexico	Inoisbel González Pitaluya; Cuba
65 kg	Lukas Chittum; United States	Hector González; Mexico	José Esteban González; Colombia
74 kg	Rocco Welsh; United States	Juan Gabriel Martínez; Dominican Republic	Pedro Samuel da Silva; Brazil
74 kg	Rocco Welsh; United States	Juan Gabriel Martínez; Dominican Republic	Geannis Garzsón Tamayo; Cuba
86 kg	Sam Wolf; United States	Juan Lazaro Ituriza; Mexico	Steven Rodríguez; Venezuela
86 kg	Sam Wolf; United States	Juan Lazaro Ituriza; Mexico	Kristian Quiñonez; Colombia
97 kg	Arturo Silot; Cuba	Peter Casale; United States	Josue Helaman Campos; Mexico
97 kg	Arturo Silot; Cuba	Peter Casale; United States	Carlos Alberto Mendoza; Venezuela
125 kg	Matthew Cover; United States	Luis Rodrigo Orozco; Mexico	Darwin Araujo; Venezuela
125 kg	Matthew Cover; United States	Luis Rodrigo Orozco; Mexico	Yoan Robert Ramirez; Cuba

=== Men's Greco-Roman ===
Event	Gold	Silver	Bronze
60 kg	Ronaldo Sánchez; Colombia	Jonaiker Martínez; Venezuela	Phillip Moomey; United States
60 kg	Ronaldo Sánchez; Colombia	Jonaiker Martínez; Venezuela	Jeremy Peralta; Ecuador
67 kg	Yonat Veliz Martínez; Cuba	Carlos Fuentes Peralta; Guatemala	Fernando Ferrer Ciprian; Dominican Republic
67 kg	Yonat Veliz Martínez; Cuba	Carlos Fuentes Peralta; Guatemala	Dominic Damon; United States
77 kg	Alain Moreno Cabrera; Cuba	Ryan Cubas Castillo; Peru	Diego Yael Macias; Mexico
77 kg	Alain Moreno Cabrera; Cuba	Ryan Cubas Castillo; Peru	Daniel David Bello; Venezuela
87 kg	Yan Luis Fernández; Cuba	Kodiak Stephens; United States	Pedro Uriel Bello; Mexico
87 kg	Yan Luis Fernández; Cuba	Kodiak Stephens; United States	Juan Leonardo Díaz; Venezuela
97 kg	Igor Queiroz; Brazil	Liober Hechevarria; Cuba	Max Madrid de León; Panama
97 kg	Igor Queiroz; Brazil	Liober Hechevarria; Cuba	Daniel Veliz; Mexico
130 kg	Jeisse Sampson Sánchez; Cuba	Beder Angel Cantu; Mexico	Eli Pannell; United States
130 kg	Jeisse Sampson Sánchez; Cuba	Beder Angel Cantu; Mexico	Kevin Morales; Colombia

=== Women's freestyle ===
Event	Gold	Silver	Bronze
50 kg	Lucía Yépez; Ecuador	Greili Carvajal; Cuba	Yorlenis Morán; Panama
50 kg	Lucía Yépez; Ecuador	Greili Carvajal; Cuba	Gloria Asca; Peru
53 kg	Laura Herin; Cuba	Zeltzin Hernandez; Mexico	Javiera Ortega Fernández; Chile
53 kg	Laura Herin; Cuba	Zeltzin Hernandez; Mexico	Mariana Rojas; Venezuela
57 kg	Yaynelis Sanz; Cuba	Tatiana Hurtado; Colombia	Paulina Romero; Mexico
57 kg	Yaynelis Sanz; Cuba	Tatiana Hurtado; Colombia	Mayra Parra; Venezuela
62 kg	Astrid Montero; Venezuela	Yolanda Cordero Vargas; Cuba	Aliyah Yates; United States
62 kg	Astrid Montero; Venezuela	Yolanda Cordero Vargas; Cuba	Meiriele Santos Hora; Brazil
68 kg	Nicoll Parrado; Colombia	Sandra Elena Escamilla; Mexico	Gloria Segura Febles; Dominican Republic
68 kg	Nicoll Parrado; Colombia	Sandra Elena Escamilla; Mexico	Thaissa Ribeiro; Brazil
76 kg	Milaimys Marín; Cuba	Linda Machuca; Argentina	Kylie Welker; United States
76 kg	Milaimys Marín; Cuba	Linda Machuca; Argentina	María Ceballos; Colombia
