= Wrestling at the 2019 Pan American Games – Men's freestyle 97 kg =

Men's Freestyle 97 kg at the 2019 Pan American Games
- Venue: Miguel Grau Coliseum
- Dates: August 10
- Competitors: 8 from 8 nations

Medalists
Gold medal	Kyle Snyder	United States
Silver medal	José Daniel Díaz	Venezuela
Bronze medal	Luis Miguel Pérez	Dominican Republic
Bronze medal	Reineris Salas	Cuba

The men's freestyle 97 kg competition of the Wrestling events at the 2019 Pan American Games in Lima was held on August 10 at the Miguel Grau Coliseum.

== Results ==
All times are local (UTC−5)

=== Final ===
Quarterfinals		Semifinals		Finals
José Daniel Díaz (VEN)	3
Jordan Steen (CAN)	0	José Daniel Díaz (VEN)	8
Luis Miguel Pérez (DOM)	12	Luis Miguel Pérez (DOM)	1
Maxwell Lacey (CRC)	2			José Daniel Díaz (VEN)	3
Reineris Salas (CUB)				Kyle Snyder (USA)	9
Ronald Valverde (PER)	0	Reineris Salas (CUB)	1
Evan Ramos (PUR)	0	Kyle Snyder (USA)	3
Kyle Snyder (USA)	10

=== Repechage ===
Bronze medal match
Jordan Steen (CAN)	0
Luis Miguel Pérez (DOM)	10
Evan Ramos (PUR)	0
Reineris Salas (CUB)	10
