= 2024 U23 Pan American Wrestling Championships =

- Host city: Rionegro, Colombia
- Dates: 21-22 June 2024

Champions
- Freestyle: United States
- Greco-Roman: United States
- Women: United States

The 2024 U23 Pan American Wrestling Championships was the 1st edition of U23 Pan American Wrestling Championships of combined events, and it was held from 21 to 22 June in Rionegro, Colombia.

== Medal summary ==
=== Men's freestyle ===
Event	Gold	Silver	Bronze
57 kg	Charles Farmer; United States	Treye Trotman; Canada	Abel Hidalgo Berrios; Panama
57 kg	Charles Farmer; United States	Treye Trotman; Canada	Esteban Morales Mayancha; Ecuador
61 kg	Kurtis Phipps; United States	William Betancourt; Puerto Rico	Juan Lavat Cortez; Mexico
61 kg	Kurtis Phipps; United States	William Betancourt; Puerto Rico	Enrique Herrera; Peru
65 kg	Wyatt Henson; United States	Victor Parra Roman; Venezuela	Matias Munoz Ramirez; Chile
65 kg	Wyatt Henson; United States	Victor Parra Roman; Venezuela	Shannon Hanna II; Bahamas
70 kg	Daniel Cardenas; United States	Eligh Rivera; Puerto Rico	Gregor Mcneil; Canada
70 kg	Daniel Cardenas; United States	Eligh Rivera; Puerto Rico	Jorge Gatica Hinricksen; Chile
74 kg	Hunter Garvin; United States	Cesar Bordeaux Rego Alvan; Brazil	Sonny Santiago; Puerto Rico
74 kg	Hunter Garvin; United States	Cesar Bordeaux Rego Alvan; Brazil	Lautaro Seghesso; Argentina
79 kg	Clayton Whiting; United States	Owen Martin; Canada	Michael Albornoz; Colombia
86 kg	Steven Rodriguez Torreyes; Venezuela	John Gunderson; United States	Taran Goring; Canada
86 kg	Steven Rodriguez Torreyes; Venezuela	John Gunderson; United States	Kweli Hernandez Maitre; Puerto Rico
92 kg	Levi Hopkins; United States	Marlon Londoño; Colombia	Aiden Stevenson; Canada
92 kg	Levi Hopkins; United States	Marlon Londoño; Colombia	Ricardo Gomez; Argentina
97 kg	Massoma Endene; United States	Callum Knox; Canada	Juan Diaz Blanco; Venezuela
97 kg	Massoma Endene; United States	Callum Knox; Canada	Alek Ortiz Roman; Puerto Rico
125 kg	Lucas Stoddard; United States	Jorawar Dhinsa; Canada	Jonovan Smith; Puerto Rico

=== Men's Greco-Roman ===
Event	Gold	Silver	Bronze
55 kg	Cristopher Verastegui; Colombia	Abel Sánchez; Peru	William Sullivan Iv; United States
60 kg	Ronaldo Sánchez; Colombia	Angel Segura Tellez; Mexico	Yonaiker Martinez Cravo; Venezuela
60 kg	Ronaldo Sánchez; Colombia	Angel Segura Tellez; Mexico	Edwin Allain Miranda; Peru
63 kg	Hector Zapata; Mexico	Jeremy Peralta Gonzalez; Ecuador	Cristian Figueroa; Colombia
67 kg	Hunter Lewis; United States	Marco Fernandez Cubas; Peru	Gavin Eldridge; Canada
67 kg	Hunter Lewis; United States	Marco Fernandez Cubas; Peru	Alonso Parra; Colombia
72 kg	Justus Scott; United States	Nilson Sinisterra; Colombia	Julio Tovar Guzamana; Venezuela
72 kg	Justus Scott; United States	Nilson Sinisterra; Colombia	Brian Lopez Barroso; Mexico
77 kg	Brendon Abdon; United States	Ryan Cubas Castillo; Peru	Darfel Parada Camacaro; Venezuela
82 kg	Daniel Bello Vega; Venezuela	Beka Melelashvili; United States	Diego Macias Torres; Mexico
87 kg	Brian Ruiz Marin; Venezuela	Tyson Beauperthuy; United States	Carlos Salazar Gomez; Mexico
97 kg	Juan Diaz Blanco; Venezuela	Michael Altomer; United States	Ricardo Gomez; Argentina
130 kg	Keith Miley Jr; United States	Antonio Ramos; Puerto Rico	Luis Talavera Luna; Venezuela

=== Women ===
Event	Gold	Silver	Bronze
50 kg	Mariana Rojas Diaz; Venezuela	Maia Cabrera; Argentina	Heather Crull; United States
53 kg	Yusmy Chaparro; Colombia	Nathaly Herrera Huacre; Peru	Elena Ivaldi; United States
55 kg	Zeltzin Hernandez Guerra; Mexico	Montana Delawder; United States	Nohalis Loyo Jimenez; Venezuela
57 kg	Bertha Rojas Chavez; Mexico	Mia Friesen; Canada	Loyda Pechene; Colombia
57 kg	Bertha Rojas Chavez; Mexico	Mia Friesen; Canada	Camila Amarilla; Argentina
59 kg	Skye Realin; United States	Alexa Cuero; Colombia	Gabriela Cross; Canada
59 kg	Skye Realin; United States	Alexa Cuero; Colombia	Maria Fuentes Salinas; Venezuela
62 kg	Astrid Montero; Venezuela	Adaugo Nwachukwu; United States	Jolie Brisco; Canada
65 kg	Aine Drury; United States	Andrea Lopez Martinez; Mexico	Anays Meza; Colombia
68 kg	Nicoll Parrado; Colombia	Brooklyn Hays; United States	Aleah Nickel; Canada
72 kg	Jasmine Robinson; United States	María Ceballos; Colombia	Melanie Sanchez Morales; Chile
76 kg	Tristan Kelly; United States	Linda Machuca; Argentina	Brianna Fraser; Canada
76 kg	Tristan Kelly; United States	Linda Machuca; Argentina	Neirili Banguero Martinez; Venezuela

== Medal table ==
* Host nation (Colombia)

Rank	Nation	Gold	Silver	Bronze	Total
1	United States	17	7	3	27
2	Venezuela	6	1	8	15
3	Colombia*	4	4	5	13
4	Mexico	3	2	4	9
5	Canada	0	5	8	13
6	Peru	0	4	2	6
7	Puerto Rico	0	3	4	7
8	Argentina	0	2	4	6
9	Ecuador	0	1	1	2
10	Brazil	0	1	0	1
11	Chile	0	0	3	3
12	Bahamas	0	0	1	1
12	Panama	0	0	1	1
Totals (13 entries)		30	30	44	104

== Team ranking ==
Rank	Men's freestyle		Men's Greco-Roman		Women	
Rank	Team	Points	Team	Points	Team	Points
1	United States	245	United States	194	United States	200
2	Canada	139	Venezuela	155	Colombia	142
3	Puerto Rico	138	Colombia	136	Mexico	125
4	Venezuela	112	Mexico	111	Venezuela	122
5	Colombia	78	Peru	85	Canada	114
6	Mexico	71	Panama	67	Argentina	55
7	Brazil	60	Puerto Rico	50	Peru	50
8	Argentina	60	Ecuador	48	Puerto Rico	32
9	Panama	53	Argentina	41	Ecuador	31
10	Peru	39	Canada	15	Chile	25
11	Chile	30	Honduras	10	Panama	23
12	Ecuador	27	Chile	6	Brazil El Salvador	10
13	Bahamas	15				
14	Honduras	4				
15	Costa Rica	2				
