= 2023 U20 Pan American Wrestling Championships =

- Host city: Santiago, Chile
- Dates: 6–8 July 2023

Champions
- Freestyle: United States
- Greco-Roman: United States
- Women: United States

The 2023 U20 Pan American Wrestling Championships was held from 6 to 8 July in Santiago, Chile.

== Medal summary ==
=== Men's freestyle ===
Event	Gold	Silver	Bronze
57 kg	Luke Lilledahl; United States	Adrian De Jesus; Puerto Rico	Esteban Morales Mayancha; Ecuador
57 kg	Luke Lilledahl; United States	Adrian De Jesus; Puerto Rico	Treye Trotman; Canada
61 kg	Nicholas Bouzakis; United States	Enrique Herrera; Peru	Joao da Silva Neto; Brazil
65 kg	Phillip Webster; United States	Nathan Hunyady; Canada	Jose Benites Vasquez; Peru
65 kg	Phillip Webster; United States	Nathan Hunyady; Canada	Jacob Brunner; Puerto Rico
70 kg	Antrell Taylor; United States	Julian George; Puerto Rico	Cesar Escamilla Menchaca; Mexico
70 kg	Antrell Taylor; United States	Julian George; Puerto Rico	Nathan Rainville; Canada
74 kg	Mitchell Mesenbrink; United States	Amaan Ali Gulacha; Canada	Tanner Peake; Puerto Rico
74 kg	Mitchell Mesenbrink; United States	Amaan Ali Gulacha; Canada	Paulo Goncalves da Silva; Brazil
79 kg	Gabriel Arnold; United States	Connor Church; Canada	Juan Cardozo; Colombia
79 kg	Gabriel Arnold; United States	Connor Church; Canada	Kevin Olavarria Montilla; Puerto Rico
86 kg	Bennett Berge; United States	Steven Rodriguez Torreyes; Venezuela	Max Magelhaes de Almeida; Brazil
86 kg	Bennett Berge; United States	Steven Rodriguez Torreyes; Venezuela	Kweli Hernandez Maitre; Puerto Rico
92 kg	Jack Darrah; United States	Samuel Pereira; Canada	Ricardo Gomez; Argentina
97 kg	Camden Mc Danel; United States	Alek Ortiz Roman; Puerto Rico	Kyle Santana Oliveira; Brazil
125 kg	Karanveer Singh Mahil; Canada	Bradley Hill; United States	Luis de La Rosa Arteaga; Mexico

=== Men's Greco-Roman ===
Event	Gold	Silver	Bronze
55 kg	Roberto Estrada; United States	Abel Sanches Juarez; Peru	Not awarded
60 kg	Jeremy Peralta Gonzalez; Ecuador	Zan Fugitt; United States	Edwin Allain Miranda; Peru
63 kg	Landon Drury; United States	Arnoldo Priboste; Argentina	Patrick Rodriguez Quinto; Ecuador
67 kg	Jadon Skellinger; United States	Alonso Parra; Colombia	Marco Fernandez Cubas; Peru
72 kg	Arvin Khosravy; United States	Nilson Sinisterra; Colombia	Alexis Vargas Ramirez; Mexico
72 kg	Arvin Khosravy; United States	Nilson Sinisterra; Colombia	Franco Gonzalez Palma; Chile
77 kg	Derek Matthews; United States	Darfel Parada Camarcaro; Venezuela	Darío Cubas Castillo; Peru
77 kg	Derek Matthews; United States	Darfel Parada Camarcaro; Venezuela	Raul Unzueta Torres; Mexico
82 kg	Michael Altomer; United States	Christian Medina Nunez; Mexico	Samir Cabeza Vacilio; Ecuador
87 kg	Wyatt Voelker; United States	Brian Ruiz Marin; Venezuela	Max Franca Magalhaes de Almeida; Brazil
97 kg	Juan Diaz Blanco; Venezuela	Sawyer Bartlet; United States	Ricardo Gomez; Argentina
130 kg	Aden Attao; United States	Jose Ureta Valdivia; Mexico	Juan Calderon Molina; Ecuador

=== Women ===
Event	Gold	Silver	Bronze
50 kg	Mia Palumbo; United States	Maia Cabrera; Argentina	Antuaneth Casusol Casas; Peru
50 kg	Mia Palumbo; United States	Maia Cabrera; Argentina	Serena Rosa Di Benedetto; Canada
53 kg	Alexandra Szkotnicki; United States	Shammilka Miranda Diaz; Puerto Rico	Emilly Dos Santos Ferreira; Brazil
55 kg	Virginia Foard; United States	Angie Zea Alvarado; Peru	Angelica Vicente Gonzalez; Puerto Rico
57 kg	Camila Amarilla; Argentina	Bertha Rojas Chavez; Mexico	Tatiana Hurtado; Colombia
59 kg	Sarah Savidge; United States	Leonela Guezo Ortiz; Ecuador	Alexa Cuero; Colombia
62 kg	Melanie Jimenez Villalba; Mexico	Mayara Ramos Pereira; Brazil	Eliana Fuentes; Colombia
62 kg	Melanie Jimenez Villalba; Mexico	Mayara Ramos Pereira; Brazil	Savannah Cosme; United States
65 kg	Mariella Schmit; United States	Gleymaris Beria Diaz; Venezuela	Evelyn Orta Gonzalez; Mexico
68 kg	Nicoll Parrado; Colombia	London Houston; United States	Leticia de Oliveira Giaon Piazza; Brazil
72 kg	Haley Ward; United States	Paige Maher; Canada	Karla Castillo Garcia; Venezuela
76 kg	Kylie Welker; United States	Myah Phillips; Canada	Maria de Almeida Dos Santos; Brazil

== Medal table ==
* Host nation (Chile)

Rank	Nation	Gold	Silver	Bronze	Total
1	United States	24	4	1	29
2	Canada	1	6	3	10
3	Venezuela	1	4	1	6
4	Mexico	1	3	5	9
5	Colombia	1	2	4	7
6	Argentina	1	2	2	5
7	Ecuador	1	1	4	6
8	Puerto Rico	0	4	5	9
9	Peru	0	3	5	8
10	Brazil	0	1	8	9
11	Chile*	0	0	1	1
Totals (11 entries)		30	30	39	99

== Team ranking ==
Rank	Men's freestyle		Men's Greco-Roman		Women's freestyle	
Rank	Team	Points	Team	Points	Team	Points
1	United States	245	United States	240	United States	222
2	Canada	154	Ecuador	98	Canada	116
3	Puerto Rico	130	Mexico	94	Mexico	110
4	Brazil	86	Peru	83	Brazil	78
5	Mexico	79	Brazil	78	Peru	74
6	Ecuador	69	Venezuela	65	Colombia	70
7	Peru	65	Colombia	58	Puerto Rico	53
8	Venezuela	64	Chile	42	Chile	50
9	Colombia	33	Argentina	35	Argentina	45
10	Argentina	31	Barbados Paraguay Puerto Rico	10	Venezuela	37
11	Chile	22	—		Ecuador	30
12	Guatemala Paraguay	10	—		El Salvador	12
13	—		Honduras	0		
14	Honduras	8				
15	El Salvador	6				
16	Barbados	4				
