= 2026 U23 Pan American Wrestling Championships =

Wrestling event in Queretaro, Mexico

- Host city: Lima, Peru
- Dates: 11–13 June 2026

Champions
- Freestyle: United States
- Greco-Roman: United States
- Women: United States

The 2026 U23 Pan American Wrestling Championships was the 3rd edition of U23 Pan American Wrestling Championships of combined events, and it was held from 11 to 13 June in Lima, Peru.

== Medal summary ==
=== Men's freestyle ===
| Event | Gold | Silver | Bronze |
|---|---|---|---|
| 57 kg | Troy Spratley; United States | Duvan García; Colombia | Adrian Samano; Puerto Rico |
| 57 kg | Troy Spratley; United States | Duvan García; Colombia | Esteban Morales Mayancha; Ecuador |
| 61 kg | Massey Odiotti; United States | Matthew Alves Lopes; Brazil | Irie Jackson; Jamaica |
| 61 kg | Massey Odiotti; United States | Matthew Alves Lopes; Brazil | Enrique Herrera; Peru |
| 65 kg | Omar Ayoub; Puerto Rico | Noah Tolentino; United States | Zachary Espalin; Mexico |
| 70 kg | Jordan Williams; United States | Jazziel Balam Canul; Mexico | Victor Soto Rivera; Puerto Rico |
| 74 kg | Nicco Ruiz; United States | Rafael Garcia Morales; Puerto Rico | Arnoldo Proboste; Argentina |
| 74 kg | Nicco Ruiz; United States | Rafael Garcia Morales; Puerto Rico | Leandro Araujo; Brazil |
| 79 kg | Daschle Lamer; United States | Orlando Cruz Jr; Puerto Rico | Kydyn Luk Correa Lima; Brazil |
| 86 kg | Bennett Berge; United States | Ortiz Roman; Puerto Rico | Owen Gudmundson; Canada |
| 92 kg | Hayden Walters; United States | Lorenzo Pellot Vazquez; Puerto Rico | Glean Gonzalez; Ecuador |
| 97 kg | Justin Rademacher; United States | Mauro Pellot Vazquez; Puerto Rico | Adrian Vasconcelos De Santana; Brazil |
| 125 kg | Connor Mirasola; United States | Jorawar Dhinsa; Canada | Ethan Vergara; Puerto Rico |

=== Men's Greco-Roman ===
| Event | Gold | Silver | Bronze |
|---|---|---|---|
| 55 kg | Kenneth Crosby; United States | José Castañeda; Colombia | Erick Choc Choc; Guatemala |
| 60 kg | Rodrigo Falcon Aguirre; Mexico | Maxwell Black; United States | Augusto Vargas Valle; Chile |
| 60 kg | Rodrigo Falcon Aguirre; Mexico | Maxwell Black; United States | Patrick Rodriguez Quinto; Ecuador |
| 63 kg | Pierson Manville; United States | Clisman Carracedo Veliz; Ecuador | Zeus Gonzalez Gonzalez; Mexico |
| 67 kg | Jeremy Peralta Gonzalez; Ecuador | Marco Fernandez Cubas; Peru | Sebastian Bustamante Mejias; Chile |
| 67 kg | Jeremy Peralta Gonzalez; Ecuador | Marco Fernandez Cubas; Peru | Abisai Camacho Valenciano; Mexico |
| 72 kg | Nilson Sinisterra; Colombia | Dominic Way; United States | Osvaldo Yanez Silva; Mexico |
| 72 kg | Nilson Sinisterra; Colombia | Dominic Way; United States | Royglen Temple Batista; Panama |
| 77 kg | Alonso Parra; Colombia | Rafael Garcia Morales; Puerto Rico | Pablo Benitez Castro; Mexico |
| 77 kg | Alonso Parra; Colombia | Rafael Garcia Morales; Puerto Rico | Oscar Barrios Rochez; Honduras |
| 82 kg | Adrian Artsisheuskiy; United States | Heder Saldana Bernardino; Mexico | Maycki Flores Ayala; Peru |
| 87 kg | Keenan Wyatt; United States | Oscar Aguilar Godos; Mexico | Kauan Ferreira Gomes; Brazil |
| 97 kg | Soren Herzog; United States | Ricardo Gomez; Argentina | Jean Zambrano Longas; Ecuador |
| 130 kg | Aden Attao; United States | Antonio Ramos; Puerto Rico | Fabrizio Seminario Calla; Peru |

=== Women ===
| Event | Gold | Silver | Bronze |
|---|---|---|---|
| 50 kg | Sage Mortimer; United States | Genesis Ramirez Sanabria; Puerto Rico | Ivy Threatful; Canada |
| 50 kg | Sage Mortimer; United States | Genesis Ramirez Sanabria; Puerto Rico | Yorlenis Moran Sanchez; Panama |
| 53 kg | Sydney Petzinger; United States | Shammilka Miranda Diaz; Puerto Rico | María Ramírez; Colombia |
| 55 kg | Karissa Turnwall; United States | Yusmy Chaparro; Colombia | Josefina Ramirez Duarte; Mexico |
| 57 kg | Gabriela Cross; Canada | Sara Sterner; United States | Thaina Anibal Ribeiro; Brazil |
| 59 kg | Camila Amarilla; Argentina | Alexandra Szkotnicki; United States | Jania Dunigan; Puerto Rico |
| 59 kg | Camila Amarilla; Argentina | Alexandra Szkotnicki; United States | Tatiana Hurtado; Colombia |
| 62 kg | Melanie Jimenez Villalba; Mexico | Claire DiCugno; United States | Alexa Cuero; Colombia |
| 65 kg | Nina Makem; United States | Heaven Emond; Canada | Emilia Anaya Raya; Mexico |
| 68 kg | Noelle Gaffney; United States | Nicoll Parrado; Colombia | Debanhi Tapia Garcia; Mexico |
| 72 kg | Taylor Graveman; United States | Linda Martinez Armenta; Mexico | Gabriella Reid; Puerto Rico |
| 76 kg | Alexandria Alli; United States | Edna Jimenez Villalba; Mexico | Paola Rodriguez Guzman; Puerto Rico |

== Medal table ==
* Host nation (Peru)

| Rank | Nation | Gold | Silver | Bronze | Total |
|---|---|---|---|---|---|
| 1 | United States | 22 | 6 | 0 | 28 |
| 2 | Mexico | 2 | 5 | 8 | 15 |
| 3 | Colombia | 2 | 4 | 3 | 9 |
| 4 | Puerto Rico | 1 | 9 | 6 | 16 |
| 5 | Canada | 1 | 2 | 2 | 5 |
| 6 | Ecuador | 1 | 1 | 4 | 6 |
| 7 | Argentina | 1 | 1 | 1 | 3 |
| 8 | Brazil | 0 | 1 | 5 | 6 |
| 9 | Peru* | 0 | 1 | 3 | 4 |
| 10 | Chile | 0 | 0 | 2 | 2 |
| 10 | Panama | 0 | 0 | 2 | 2 |
| 12 | Guatemala | 0 | 0 | 1 | 1 |
| 12 | Honduras | 0 | 0 | 1 | 1 |
| 12 | Jamaica | 0 | 0 | 1 | 1 |
| Totals (14 entries) | | 30 | 30 | 39 | 99 |

== Team ranking ==
| Rank | Men's freestyle | | Men's Greco-Roman | | Women's freestyle | |
| Rank | Team | Points | Team | Points | Team | Points |
|---|---|---|---|---|---|---|
| 1 | United States | 245 | United States | 208 | United States | 235 |
| 2 | Puerto Rico | 180 | Mexico | 134 | Puerto Rico | 126 |
| 3 | Mexico | 100 | Colombia | 121 | Mexico | 124 |
| 4 | Canada | 81 | Ecuador | 105 | Canada | 114 |
| 5 | Peru | 80 | Peru | 102 | Colombia | 97 |
| 6 | Brazil | 75 | Puerto Rico | 86 | Peru | 74 |
| 7 | Ecuador | 39 | Chile | 51 | Ecuador | 36 |
| 8 | Colombia | 38 | Guatemala | 47 | Guatemala | 36 |
| 9 | Chile | 30 | Panama | 43 | Brazil | 34 |
| 10 | Guatemala | 28 | Argentina | 30 | Argentina | 25 |
| 11 | Panama | 18 | Brazil | 27 | Panama | 15 |
| 12 | Argentina | 15 | Honduras | 15 | Chile | 12 |
| 13 | Jamaica | 15 | Barbados | 10 | | |
