= 2025 U23 World Wrestling Championships – Women's freestyle 57 kg =

Wrestling competitions

Women's freestyle 57 kg at the 2025 U23 World Championships
- Venue: SPC Vojvodina
- Dates: 23–24 October
- Competitors: 20 from 18 nations

Medalists
gold medal	Akari Fujinami	Japan
silver medal	Aryna Martynava
bronze medal	Neha Sharma	India
bronze medal	Yaynelis Sanz	Cuba

The women's freestyle 57 kilograms is a competition featured at the 2025 U23 World Wrestling Championships, and was held in Novi Sad, Serbia on 23 and 24 October 2025.

This freestyle wrestling competition consists of a single-elimination tournament, with a repechage used to determine the winner of two bronze medals. The two finalists face off for gold and silver medals. Each wrestler who loses to one of the two finalists moves into the repechage, culminating in a pair of bronze medal matches featuring the semifinal losers each facing the remaining repechage opponent from their half of the bracket.

== Results ==
Legend

- F — Won by fall

=== Final ===
Final
Akari Fujinami (JPN)	10
Aryna Martynava (UWW)	0

=== Top half ===
Round of 32
Inna Alimova (LTU)	10
Nethmi Poruthotage (SRI)	15
Neha Sharma (IND)	6
Georgiana Lircă (ROU)	0

Round of 16
Ulmeken Esenbaeva (UZB)	2
Bertha Rojas (MEX)	10^{F}
Nethmi Poruthotage (SRI)	2
Róza Szenttamási (HUN)	6
Nilufar Raimova (KAZ)	0
Neha Sharma (IND)	5
Tang Yifan (CHN)	0
Akari Fujinami (JPN)	10

Quarterfinals
Bertha Rojas (MEX)	2
Róza Szenttamási (HUN)	8
Neha Sharma (IND)	0
Akari Fujinami (JPN)	10

Semifinals
Róza Szenttamási (HUN)	0
Akari Fujinami (JPN)	10

=== Bottom half ===
Round of 32
Nargiz Samadova (AZE)	4
Jana Petrović (SRB)	2
Mia Friesen (CAN)	2
Oleksandra Khomenets (UKR)	7

Round of 16
Anastasia Kozlova (UWW)	2
Cecilia Williams (USA)	1
Nargiz Samadova (AZE)	0
Emine Çakmak (TUR)	10
Chahed Jeljeli (TUN)	3
Oleksandra Khomenets (UKR)	9
Yaynelis Sanz (CUB)	4
Aryna Martynava (UWW)	4

Quarterfinals
Anastasia Kozlova (UWW)	3
Emine Çakmak (TUR)	4
Oleksandra Khomenets (UKR)	0
Aryna Martynava (UWW)	8^{F}

Semifinals
Emine Çakmak (TUR)	0
Aryna Martynava (UWW)	6^{F}

=== Repechage ===
Repechage round 2
Tang Yifan (CHN)	0
Neha Sharma (IND)	10
Yaynelis Sanz (CUB)	WO
Oleksandra Khomenets (UKR)

Bronze medals
Neha Sharma (IND)	5
Róza Szenttamási (HUN)	0
Yaynelis Sanz (CUB)	6
Emine Çakmak (TUR)	4

== Final standing ==
Rank	Athlete
1st place, gold medalist(s)	Akari Fujinami (JPN)
2nd place, silver medalist(s)	Aryna Martynava (UWW)
3rd place, bronze medalist(s)	Neha Sharma (IND)
3rd place, bronze medalist(s)	Yaynelis Sanz (CUB)
5	Róza Szenttamási (HUN)
5	Emine Çakmak (TUR)
7	Bertha Rojas (MEX)
8	Oleksandra Khomenets (UKR)
9	Nethmi Poruthotage (SRI)
10	Anastasia Kozlova (UWW)
11	Nargiz Samadova (AZE)
12	Inna Alimova (LTU)
13	Chahed Jeljeli (TUN)
14	Jana Petrović (SRB)
15	Mia Friesen (CAN)
16	Cecilia Williams (USA)
17	Ulmeken Esenbaeva (UZB)
18	Nilufar Raimova (KAZ)
19	Georgiana Lircă (ROU)
20	Tang Yifan (CHN)
