= Shannon Hanna =

Bahamian wrestler (born 2001)

Personal information
- Native name: Shannon Hanna
- Full name: Shannon Geran Hanna II
- Nationality: Bahamian/American
- Born: March 23, 2001 (age 25) Florida, U.S.A
- Home town: Lakeland, Florida, U.S.A
- Education: Campbell University
- Height: 5 ft 9 in (175 cm)
- Weight: 65 kg (143 lb)

Sport
- Sport: Wrestling
- Weight class: 65 kg
- Events: Freestyle and Folkstyle
- Club: Tarheel Wrestling Club
Medal record
Men's freestyle wrestling
Representing the Bahamas
Pan American Championships
Bronze medal – third place	2024 Acapulco	65 kg
Bronze medal – third place	2026 Coraville	65 kg
Central American and Caribbean Games
Silver medal – second place	2026 Santo Domingo	65 kg
Men's collegiate wrestling
Representing Campbell University
Southern Conference
Silver medal – second place	2025	141 lb
Gold medal – first place	2023	141 lb
Gold medal – first place	2022	141 lb
Silver medal – second place	2021	141 lb

Shannon Hanna II (born 2002) is a freestyle wrestler and graduated folkstyle wrestler who competes internationally for Bahamas at 65 kg and 70 kg.

== Background ==
Hanna II mostly participated in American football until he reached high school at Lake Gibson High School in Florida.

== Folkstyle career ==
=== High school ===
During his high school wrestling years, Hanna II competed at Lake Gibson High School in the Florida, where he was a state placer.

=== College ===
In collegiate wrestling, Hanna started his career at Old Dominion University in Virginia and later transferred to Campbell University in North Carolina.

== Freestyle career ==
Hanna II has won numerous historical international medal competing for Bahamas. He earned a silver medal at the 2026 Central American and Caribbean Games at 65 kg.

He won bronze at the 2026 Senior Pan Am Championships and 2024 Senior Pan Am Championships and bronze medal at the 2024 U23 Pan Am Championships all at 65 kg.

Has has also competed at numerous u23 and Senior World Championships for Bahamas.

Hanna is a dual citizen of the United States and Bahamas.

== Freestyle record ==
Senior Freestyle Matches
Res.	Record	Opponent	Score	Date	Event	Location
Loss		(Romania) Ștefan Coman	0-1	October 28, 2026	2026 World Wrestling Championships	Astana, Kazakhstan
2026 Central American and Caribbean Games (silver) at 65 kg
Loss		(Puerto Rico) Joey Silva	0–3	July 30–31, 2026	2026 Central American and Caribbean Games	Santo Domingo, Dominican Republic
Win		(Mexico) Zachary Espalin Aguirre	3–2	July 30–31, 2026	2026 Central American and Caribbean Games	Santo Domingo, Dominican Republic
Win		(Venezuela) Wilfredo Rodriquez	6-4	July 30–31, 2026	2026 Central American and Caribbean Games	Santo Domingo, Dominican Republic
Win		(Dominican Republic) Tommy Garcia Sanchez	4-1	July 30–31, 2026	2026 Central American and Caribbean Games	Santo Domingo, Dominican Republic
2026 Pan American Wrestling Championships (bronze) at 65 kg
Win		(Dominican Republic) Tommy Garcia Sanchez	7–3	May 10, 2026	2026 Pan American Wrestling_Championships	(United States) Coraville, Iowa
Loss		(United States) Real Woods	0–9	May 10, 2026	2026 Pan American Wrestling_Championships	(United States) Coraville, Iowa
Win		(Peru) José Benites	10-0	May 10, 2026	2026 Pan American Wrestling_Championships	(United States) Coraville, Iowa
Loss		(Azerbaijan) Kanan Heybatov	0 - 10	September 13, 2025	2025 World Wrestling Championships	Zagreb, Croatia
Win		(Cape Verde) Anthony Wesley	WO	September 13, 2025	2025 World Wrestling Championships	Zagreb, Croatia
2024 U23 Pan American Wrestling Championships (bronze) at 65 kg
Win		(Puerto Rico) Tyler David Knox	10–0	June 22, 2024	2024 U23 Pan American Wrestling Championships	Rio Negro, Colombia
Loss		(United States) Wyatt Henson	2–4	June 22, 2024	2024 U23 Pan American Wrestling Championships	Rio Negro, Colombia
2024 Pan American Wrestling Championships (bronze) at 65 kg
Win		(Dominican Republic) Álbaro Rudesindo	11–9	February 24, 2024	2024 Pan American Wrestling Championships	Acapuco, Mexico
Loss		(Argentina) Agustín Destribats	2–5	February 24, 2024	2024 Pan American Wrestling Championships	Acapuco, Mexico
Win		(Peru) Sixto Auccapiña	4-1	February 24, 2024	2024 Pan American Wrestling Championships	Acapuco, Mexico
