= Nicoll Parrado =

Colombian freestyle wrestler

Personal information
- Full name: Nicoll Dayanna Parrado Osorio
- Born: 9 August 2003 (age 23)

Sport
- Country: Colombia
- Sport: Amateur wrestling
- Weight class: 65 kg; 68 kg; 70 kg
- Events: Freestyle; Beach wrestling
Medal record
Representing Colombia
Event	1st	2nd	3rd
Pan American Games	0	0	1
CAC Games	0	1	1
South American Beach Games	0	0	1
Junior Pan American Games	1	0	0
U23 Pan American Championships	1	1	0
U20 Pan American Championships	2	0	0
U17 Pan American Championships	1	0	0
Total	5	2	3
Women's freestyle wrestling
Pan American Games
Bronze medal – third place	2023 Santiago	68 kg
Central American and Caribbean Games
Silver medal – second place	2023 San Salvador	68 kg
Bronze medal – third place	2026 Santo Domingo	68 kg
Junior Pan American Games
Gold medal – first place	2021 Cali-Valle	68 kg
U23 Pan American Championships
Gold medal – first place	2024 Rionegro	68 kg
Silver medal – second place	2026 Lima	68 kg
U20 Pan American Championships
Gold medal – first place	2022 Oaxtepec	68 kg
Gold medal – first place	2023 Santiago	68 kg
U17 Pan American Championships
Gold medal – first place	2019 Morelia	65 kg
Women's beach wrestling
South American Beach Games
Bronze medal – third place	2023 Santa Marta	70 kg

Nicoll Dayanna Parrado Osorio (Note: In this Spanish name, the first or paternal surname is Parrado and the second or maternal family name is Osorio.) (born 9 August 2003) is a Colombian freestyle wrestler. She won one of the bronze medals in the women's 68 kg event at the 2023 Pan American Games held in Santiago, Chile. She won the silver medal in her event at the 2023 Central American and Caribbean Games held in San Salvador, El Salvador.

== Career ==
Parrado won the gold medal in the women's 68 kg event at the 2021 Junior Pan American Games held in Cali, Colombia. As a result, she directly qualified to compete in the women's 68 kg event at the 2023 Pan American Games in Santiago, Chile.

Parrado won the silver medal in her event at the 2023 Central American and Caribbean Games held in San Salvador, El Salvador. In September 2023, she competed in the women's 68 kg event at the 2023 World Wrestling Championships held in Belgrade, Serbia. She was eliminated in her second match by Koumba Larroque of France. In November 2023, Parrado won one of the bronze medals in the women's 68 kg event at the 2023 Pan American Games held in Santiago, Chile. She defeated Virginia Jiménez of Chile in her bronze medal match.

Parrado competed at the 2024 Pan American Wrestling Olympic Qualification Tournament held in Acapulco, Mexico hoping to qualify for the 2024 Summer Olympics in Paris, France. She was eliminated in her first match. Parrado also competed at the 2024 World Wrestling Olympic Qualification Tournament held in Istanbul, Turkey without qualifying for the Olympics. She was eliminated in her second match.

== Achievements ==
Year	Tournament	Location	Result	Event
Representing Colombia
2019	U17 Pan American Championships	Morelia, Mexico	1st	Freestyle 65 kg
2021	Junior Pan American Games	Cali, Colombia	1st	Freestyle 68 kg
2022	U20 Pan American Championships	Oaxtepec, Mexico	1st	Freestyle 68 kg
2023	Central American and Caribbean Games	San Salvador, El Salvador	2nd	Freestyle 68 kg
2023	U20 Pan American Championships	Santiago, Chile	1st	Freestyle 68 kg
2023	South American Beach Games	Santa Marta, Colombia	3rd	Beach wrestling 70 kg
2023	Pan American Games	Santiago, Chile	3rd	Freestyle 68 kg
2024	U23 Pan American Championships	Rionegro, Colombia	1st	Freestyle 68 kg
2026	U23 Pan American Championships	Lima, Peru	2nd	Freestyle 68 kg
2026	Central American and Caribbean Games	Santo Domingo, Dominican Republic	3rd	Freestyle 68 kg
