= Kevin de Armas =

Cuban wrestler

Personal information
- Full name: Kevin Yuran de Armas Rodriguez
- Born: 19 January 1998 (age 28) Camagüey, Cuba

Sport
- Country: Cuba
- Sport: Greco-Roman wrestling
- Weight class: 60 kg
Medal record
Men's Greco-Roman wrestling
Representing Cuba
Pan American Games
Silver medal – second place	2023 Santiago	60 kg
Central American and Caribbean Games
Gold medal – first place	2023 San Salvador	60 kg
Gold medal – first place	2026 Santo Domingo	60 kg
Pan American Championships
Gold medal – first place	2026 Coralville	60 kg
Bronze medal – third place	2023 Buenos Aires	60 kg

Kevin Yuran de Armas Rodriguez (Note: In this Spanish name, the first or paternal surname is de Armas and the second or maternal family name is Rodriguez.) (born 19 January 1998) is a Cuban wrestler. Representing Cuba at the 2024 Summer Olympics, he qualified at the Pan American Wrestling Olympic Qualifier tournament in Acapulco. Competing in the men's 60kg Greco-Roman wrestling event, de Armas lost to Kenichiro Fumita and lost to Mehdi Mohsennejad in the repchage. He won gold in the 60kg weight class at the 2026 Pan American Wrestling Championships.
