= Wrestling at the 2023 Pan American Games – Men's Greco-Roman 60 kg =

Men's Greco-Roman 60 at the 2023 Pan American Games
- Venue: Olympic Training Center in Ñuñoa
- Dates: November 3
- Competitors: 9 from 9 nations

Medalists
Gold medal	Ildar Hafizov	United States
Silver medal	Kevin de Armas	Cuba
Bronze medal	Jeremy Peralta	Ecuador
Bronze medal	Raiber Rodríguez	Venezuela

The men's Greco-Roman 60 kg competition of the Wrestling events at the 2023 Pan American Games in Ñuñoa was held on November 3.

== Qualification ==
The winner of each weight category at the 2021 Junior Pan American Games in Cali, Colombia qualified directly, along with the top four at the 2022 Pan American Wrestling Championships and 2023 Pan American Wrestling Championships. The host country (Chile) is guaranteed a spot in each event, but its athletes must compete in both the 2022 and 2023 Pan American Championship. If Chile does not qualify at any of the first two events, it will take the fourth spot available at the 2023 Pan American Championships. A further six wildcards (four men and two women) will be awarded to nations without any qualified athlete but took part in the qualification tournaments.

== Schedule ==
All times are local (UTC−3)

Date	Time	Event
Wednesday, 3 November 2023	10:00	Round of 16
Wednesday, 3 November 2023	11:00	Quarterfinals
Wednesday, 3 November 2023	12:00	Semifinals
Wednesday, 3 November 2023	17:00	Finals

== Results ==
Legend

- F — Won by fall

=== Main Bracket ===
Round of 16
Samuel Mesropian (ARG)	0
Jeremy Peralta (ECU)	9

Quarterfinals
Yerony Liria (DOM)	2
Jeremy Peralta (ECU)	7
Ildar Hafizov (USA)	WO
~~Samuel Gurria (MEX)~~
Kevin de Armas (CUB)	8
Cristóbal Torres (CHI)	0
Raiber Rodríguez (VEN)	7
Dicther Toro (COL)	3

Semifinals
Jeremy Peralta (ECU)	0
Ildar Hafizov (USA)	8
Kevin de Armas (CUB)	7
Raiber Rodríguez (VEN)	1

Finals
Ildar Hafizov (USA)	7
Kevin de Armas (CUB)	5

=== Repechage ===
Bronze medal match
~~Samuel Gurria (MEX)~~
Jeremy Peralta (ECU)	WO
Cristóbal Torres (CHI)	1
Raiber Rodríguez (VEN)	7

== Final standing ==
Rank	Athlete
1st place, gold medalist(s)	Ildar Hafizov (USA)
2nd place, silver medalist(s)	Kevin de Armas (CUB)
3rd place, bronze medalist(s)	Jeremy Peralta (ECU)
3rd place, bronze medalist(s)	Raiber Rodríguez (VEN)
5	Cristóbal Torres (CHI)
6	Dicther Toro (COL)
7	Yerony Liria (DOM)
8	Samuel Mesropian (ARG)
—	Samuel Gurria (MEX)
