= Yaynelis Sanz =

Cuban freestyle wrestler

Yaynelis Sanz Verdecia
Sport
- Country: Cuba
- Sport: Amateur wrestling
- Weight class: 57 kg
- Event: Freestyle
Medal record
Women's freestyle wrestling
Representing Cuba
Pan American Championships
Gold medal – first place	2022 Acapulco	57 kg
Gold medal – first place	2025 Monterrey	57 kg
Bronze medal – third place	2026 Coralville	57 kg
Central American and Caribbean Games
Gold medal – first place	2026 Santo Domingo	57 kg
U23 World Championships
Bronze medal – third place	2025 Novi Sad	57kg
Junior Pan American Games
Gold medal – first place	2021 Cali-Valle	57 kg
Gold medal – first place	2025 Asunción	57 kg

Yaynelis Sanz Verdecia is a Cuban freestyle wrestler. She is a two-time gold medalist at the Pan American Wrestling Championships (2022 and 2025).

== Career ==
In 2021, she won the gold medal in the women's 57 kg event at the Junior Pan American Games held in Cali and Valle, Colombia. She competed in the 55 kg event at the 2022 World Wrestling Championships held in Belgrade, Serbia where she was eliminated in her first match.

Sanz competed at the 2024 World Wrestling Olympic Qualification Tournament in Istanbul, Turkey without qualifying for the 2024 Summer Olympics in Paris, France. She was eliminated in her third match.

== Achievements ==
Year	Tournament	Location	Result	Event
2022	Pan American Wrestling Championships	Acapulco, Mexico	1st	Freestyle 57 kg
2025	Pan American Wrestling Championships	Monterrey, Mexico	1st	Freestyle 57 kg
2025	U23 World Wrestling Championships	Novi Sad, Serbia	3rd	Freestyle 57 kg
2026	Central American and Caribbean Games	Santo Domingo, Dominican Republic	1st	Freestyle 57 kg
2026	Pan American Wrestling Championships	Coralville, United States	3rd	Freestyle 57 kg
