= 2025 Pan American Wrestling Championships =

- Host city: Monterrey, Mexico
- Dates: 8–11 May 2025
- Stadium: Gimnasio Nuevo León

Champions
- Freestyle: United States
- Greco-Roman: United States
- Women: United States

The 2025 Pan American Wrestling Championships was held from 8 to 11 May in Monterrey, Mexico.

== Medal table ==
* Host nation (Mexico)

Rank	Nation	Gold	Silver	Bronze	Total
1	United States	18	6	4	28
2	Cuba	4	1	2	7
3	Canada	3	5	6	14
4	Mexico*	2	4	10	16
5	Ecuador	2	0	3	5
6	Argentina	1	2	1	4
7	Venezuela	0	5	8	13
8	Puerto Rico	0	3	1	4
9	Honduras	0	1	2	3
9	Peru	0	1	2	3
11	Brazil	0	1	1	2
11	Chile	0	1	1	2
13	Guatemala	0	0	2	2
Totals (13 entries)		30	30	43	103

== Team ranking ==
Rank	Men's freestyle		Men's Greco-Roman		Women's freestyle	
Rank	Team	Points	Team	Points	Team	Points
1	United States	230	United States	209	United States	207
2	Canada	144	Mexico	143	Canada	170
3	Mexico	139	Venezuela	90	Mexico	131
4	Puerto Rico	97	Cuba	75	Venezuela	93
5	Venezuela	85	Ecuador	63	Brazil	90
6	Argentina	57	Honduras	57	Ecuador	72
7	Peru	51	Brazil	55	Cuba	55
8	Brazil	49	Peru	54	Argentina	31
9	Guatemala	47	Chile	44	Peru	16
10	Ecuador	31	Panama	42	Chile	15

== Medal summary ==
=== Men's freestyle ===
Event	Gold	Silver	Bronze
57 kg	Roman Bravo-Young; Mexico	Lucas Rodríguez; Puerto Rico	Liam Cronin; United States
57 kg	Roman Bravo-Young; Mexico	Lucas Rodríguez; Puerto Rico	Edwin Segura; Guatemala
61 kg	Jax Forrest; United States	Joseph Andres Silva; Puerto Rico	Joshua Kramer; Ecuador
61 kg	Jax Forrest; United States	Joseph Andres Silva; Puerto Rico	Garette Saunders; Canada
65 kg	Agustín Destribats; Argentina	Joseph McKenna; United States	Peiman Biabani; Canada
65 kg	Agustín Destribats; Argentina	Joseph McKenna; United States	Wilfredo Rodríguez; Venezuela
70 kg	Austin Gomez; Mexico	Ian Parker; United States	Sixto Auccapiña; Peru
70 kg	Austin Gomez; Mexico	Ian Parker; United States	Jacob Torres; Canada
74 kg	Ladarion Lockett; United States	Anthony Montero; Venezuela	Cristian Santiago; Mexico
74 kg	Ladarion Lockett; United States	Anthony Montero; Venezuela	Adam Thomson; Canada
79 kg	Evan Wick; United States	Shane Jones; Puerto Rico	Jasmit Phulka; Canada
86 kg	Zahid Valencia; United States	Jorge Llano; Argentina	Steven Rodríguez; Venezuela
86 kg	Zahid Valencia; United States	Jorge Llano; Argentina	Kevin de León; Mexico
92 kg	Trent Hidlay; United States	Andrew Johnson; Canada	Edwin Morales; Puerto Rico
97 kg	Justin Rademacher; United States	Arturo Silot; Cuba	Nishan Randhawa; Canada
125 kg	Wyatt Hendrickson; United States	Richard DesChatelets; Canada	José Daniel Díaz; Venezuela
125 kg	Wyatt Hendrickson; United States	Richard DesChatelets; Canada	Gino Ávila; Honduras

=== Men's Greco-Roman ===
Event	Gold	Silver	Bronze
55 kg	Jayden Raney; United States	Isaac Marín; Mexico	Not awarded *
60 kg	Maxwell Black; United States	Alexis Rodríguez; Mexico	Yonaiker Martínez; Venezuela
63 kg	Jeremy Peralta; Ecuador	Ellis Coleman; United States	Hector Sánchez; Mexico
67 kg	Luis Orta; Cuba	Nestor Almanza; Chile	Marco Fernández; Peru
67 kg	Luis Orta; Cuba	Nestor Almanza; Chile	Neiser Marimón; Venezuela
72 kg	Alejandro Sancho; United States	Nilton Soto; Peru	Irving Salazar; Mexico
77 kg	Kamal Bey; United States	Arsen Julfalakyan; Argentina	Calebe Ferreira; Brazil
77 kg	Kamal Bey; United States	Arsen Julfalakyan; Argentina	Leomar Cordero; Venezuela
82 kg	Beka Melelashvili; United States	Diego Macías; Mexico	David Choc; Guatemala
87 kg	Payton Jacobson; United States	Luis Avendaño; Venezuela	José Andrés Vargas; Mexico
97 kg	Gabriel Rosillo; Cuba	Kevin Mejía; Honduras	Michial Foy; United States
130 kg	Óscar Pino; Cuba	Cohlton Schultz; United States	Moisés Pérez; Venezuela
130 kg	Óscar Pino; Cuba	Cohlton Schultz; United States	Gino Ávila; Honduras

- Only two athletes competed, which meant only the gold and silver medals were awarded.

=== Women's freestyle ===
Event	Gold	Silver	Bronze
50 kg	Audrey Jimenez; United States	Madison Parks; Canada	Yusneylys Guzmán; Cuba
50 kg	Audrey Jimenez; United States	Madison Parks; Canada	Nohalis Loyo; Venezuela
53 kg	Lucía Yépez; Ecuador	Mariana Rojas; Venezuela	Jaslynn Gallegos; United States
53 kg	Lucía Yépez; Ecuador	Mariana Rojas; Venezuela	Adrianny Castillo; Argentina
55 kg	Karla Godinez; Canada	Louisa Schwab; United States	Andrea Avelino; Mexico
57 kg	Yaynelis Sanz; Cuba	Bertha Rojas; Mexico	Luisa Valverde; Ecuador
57 kg	Yaynelis Sanz; Cuba	Bertha Rojas; Mexico	Amanda Martinez; United States
59 kg	Laurence Beauregard; Canada	Abigail Nette; United States	Alma Valencia; Mexico
62 kg	Ana Godinez; Canada	Astrid Montero; Venezuela	Melanie Jiménez; Mexico
65 kg	Macey Kilty; United States	Miki Rowbottom; Canada	Alexis Gómez; Mexico
68 kg	Kennedy Blades; United States	Nathaly Grimán; Venezuela	Virginia Jiménez; Chile
72 kg	Tiffany Baublitz; United States	Nyla Burgess; Canada	Michelle Olea; Mexico
76 kg	Kylie Welker; United States	Thamires Machado; Brazil	Milaimys Marín; Cuba
76 kg	Kylie Welker; United States	Thamires Machado; Brazil	Génesis Reasco; Ecuador

== Participating nations ==
205 wrestlers from 17 countries:

- Argentina (8)
- Brazil (20)
- Canada (20)
- Chile (7)
- Costa Rica (2)
- Cuba (8)
- Ecuador (14)
- Guatemala (8)
- Honduras (6)
- Jamaica (1)
- Mexico (30) (Host)
- Panama (11)
- Paraguay (3)
- Peru (12)
- Puerto Rico (7)
- United States (30)
- Venezuela (18)

== Results ==
Legend

- DSQ — Disqualified
- F — Won by fall
- R — Retired
- WO — Won by walkover

=== Men's freestyle ===
==== Men's freestyle 57 kg ====
11 May

Round of 16
Liam Cronin (USA)	11
Davi Giovannetti (BRA)	1

Quarterfinals
Roman Bravo-Young (MEX)	10
Liam Cronin (USA)	0
Pedro Mejías (VEN)	10
Christopher Merlo (CAN)	0
Esteban Morales (ECU)	3
Edwin Segura (GUA)	14
Lucas Rodríguez (PUR)	13
Eduardo Palas (PER)	2

Semifinals
Roman Bravo-Young (MEX)	4
Pedro Mejías (VEN)	0
Edwin Segura (GUA)	2
Lucas Rodríguez (PUR)	13

Final
Roman Bravo-Young (MEX)	12
Lucas Rodríguez (PUR)	0

Bronze medal match
Liam Cronin (USA)	5
Pedro Mejías (VEN)	4
Eduardo Palas (PER)	0
Edwin Segura (GUA)	7

==== Men's freestyle 61 kg ====
11 May

Round of 16
Jorge Olvera (MEX)	5
Garette Saunders (CAN)	16

Quarterfinals
Joey Silva (PUR)	10
Garette Saunders (CAN)	0
Andrés González (PAN)	0
Peter Hammer (CRC)	13
Jax Forrest (USA)	10
Esteban Pérez (GUA)	0
Diego Villalba (PAR)	0
Josh Kramer (ECU)	10

Semifinals
Joey Silva (PUR)	11
Peter Hammer (CRC)	0
Jax Forrest (USA)	10
Josh Kramer (ECU)	0

Final
Joey Silva (PUR)	0
Jax Forrest (USA)	11

Bronze medal match
Garette Saunders (CAN)	14
Peter Hammer (CRC)	8
Esteban Pérez (GUA)	0
Josh Kramer (ECU)	10

==== Men's freestyle 65 kg ====
11 May

Round of 16
Jordan Mitchell (JAM)	0
Peiman Biabani (CAN)	10

Quarterfinals
Joseph McKenna (USA)	11
Peiman Biabani (CAN)	0
Jonnathan Pérez (GUA)	1
Matheus Barreto (BRA)	9^{F}
Diego Peraza (MEX)	1
Wilfredo Rodríguez (VEN)	13
Matías Muñoz (CHI)	0
Agustín Destribats (ARG)	10

Semifinals
Joseph McKenna (USA)	12
Matheus Barreto (BRA)	1
Wilfredo Rodríguez (VEN)	4
Agustín Destribats (ARG)	4

Final
Joseph McKenna (USA)	4
Agustín Destribats (ARG)	5

Bronze medal match
Peiman Biabani (CAN)	10
Matheus Barreto (BRA)	0
Matías Muñoz (CHI)	0
Wilfredo Rodríguez (VEN)	10

==== Men's freestyle 70 kg ====
11 May

Round of 16
Francisco Guzmán (PUR)	8
Jorge Gatica (CHI)	18
Ian Parker (USA)	10
Pablo Vera (PAR)	0

Quarterfinals
Austin Gomez (MEX)	12
Jorge Gatica (CHI)	0
Edvanilson de Jesus (BRA)	0
Sixto Auccapiña (PER)	4^{F}
Royglen Temple (PAN)	6
Enrique Pérez (GUA)	5
Ian Parker (USA)	10
Jacob Torres (CAN)	0

Semifinals
Austin Gomez (MEX)	10
Sixto Auccapiña (PER)	0
Royglen Temple (PAN)	0
Ian Parker (USA)	10

Final
Austin Gomez (MEX)	11
Ian Parker (USA)	0

Repechage round 1
Pablo Vera (PAR)	0
Jacob Torres (CAN)	11

Bronze medal match
Jorge Gatica (CHI)	2
Sixto Auccapiña (PER)	12
Jacob Torres (CAN)	10
Royglen Temple (PAN)	0

==== Men's freestyle 74 kg ====
11 May

Round of 16
Wilfrido Samaniego (PAN)	0
Luis Barrios (HON)	10
Adam Thomson (CAN)	6
Jhon Chunga (PER)	0

Quarterfinals
Anthony Montero (VEN)	4
Luis Barrios (HON)	0
Cristian Santiago (MEX)	7
Paulo Gonçalves (BRA)	2
Geannis Garzón (CUB)	8
Rafael García (PUR)	0
Adam Thomson (CAN)	0
Ladarion Lockett (USA)	11

Semifinals
Anthony Montero (VEN)	8
Cristian Santiago (MEX)	5
Geannis Garzón (CUB)	2^{DSQ}
Ladarion Lockett (USA)	3

Final
Anthony Montero (VEN)	0
Ladarion Lockett (USA)	11

Bronze medal match
Luis Barrios (HON)	3
Cristian Santiago (MEX)	4
Adam Thomson (CAN)	WO
Geannis Garzón (CUB)	DSQ

==== Men's freestyle 79 kg ====
11 May

Pos	Athlete	Pld	W	L	CP	TP	USA	PUR	CAN	MEX	PER
1	Evan Wick (USA)	4	4	0	16	40	—	10–0	10–0	10–0	10–0
2	Shane Jones (PUR)	4	3	1	12	33	0–4 SU	—	12–2	11–0	10–0
3	Jasmit Phulka (CAN)	4	2	2	8	21	0–4 SU	1–4 SU1	—	8–3	11–0
4	Victor Hernández (MEX)	4	1	3	5	13	0–4 SU	0–4 SU	1–3 PO1	—	10–0
5	José Ambrosio (PER)	4	0	4	0	0	0–4 SU	0–4 SU	0–4 SU	0–4 SU	—

Source: UWW

==== Men's freestyle 86 kg ====
11 May

Round of 16
Jorge Andy (ECU)	0
Steven Rodríguez (VEN)	11

Quarterfinals
Zahid Valencia (USA)	11
Steven Rodríguez (VEN)	0
Taran Goring (CAN)	12
Jesús Landa (PER)	2
Giovanni Piazza (BRA)	8
César Ubico (GUA)	10^{F}
Kevin de León (MEX)	1
Jorge Llano (ARG)	2

Semifinals
Zahid Valencia (USA)	10
Taran Goring (CAN)	0
César Ubico (GUA)	3
Jorge Llano (ARG)	4

Final
Zahid Valencia (USA)	11
Jorge Llano (ARG)	0

Bronze medal match
Steven Rodríguez (VEN)	11
Taran Goring (CAN)	0
Kevin de León (MEX)	9
César Ubico (GUA)	4

==== Men's freestyle 92 kg ====
11 May

Pos	Athlete	Pld	W	L	CP	TP	USA	CAN	PUR	MEX	PAN
1	Trent Hidlay (USA)	4	4	0	17	33	—	11–0	12–1	10–0	WO
2	Andrew Johnson (CAN)	4	3	1	12	20	0–4 SU	—	10–2	10–0	WO
3	Edwin Morales (PUR)	4	2	2	12	9	1–4 SU1	1–3 PO1	—	6–0 Fall	WO
4	Miguel Lavielle (MEX)	4	1	3	5	0	0–4 SU	0–4 SU	0–5 FA	—	WO
—	Eduardo Vega (PAN)	4	0	4	0	0	0–5 FO	0–5 FO	0–5 FO	0–5 FO	—

Source: UWW

==== Men's freestyle 97 kg ====
11 May

Pos	Athlete	Pld	W	L	CP	TP	CUB	CAN	VEN	BRA
1	Arturo Silot (CUB)	3	3	0	11	29	—	10–0	8–1	11–0
2	Nishan Randhawa (CAN)	3	2	1	7	14	0–4 SU	—	4–2	10–0
3	Cristian Sarco (VEN)	3	1	2	6	14	1–3 PO1	1–3 PO1	—	11–0
4	Ailton Rocha (BRA)	3	0	3	0	0	0–4 SU	0–4 SU	0–4 SU	—

Source: UWW

Pos	Athlete	Pld	W	L	CP	TP	USA	ARG	MEX
1	Justin Rademacher (USA)	2	2	0	9	11	—	11–0	WO
2	Ricardo Báez (ARG)	2	1	1	4	10	0–4 SU	—	10–0
3	Juan Iturriza (MEX)	2	0	2	0	0	0–5 IN	0–4 SU	—

Source: UWW

Semifinals
Arturo Silot (CUB)	10
Ricardo Báez (ARG)	0
Justin Rademacher (USA)	10
Nishan Randhawa (CAN)	0

Final
Arturo Silot (CUB)	4
Justin Rademacher (USA)	5
Bronze medal
Ricardo Báez (ARG)	0
Nishan Randhawa (CAN)	11

==== Men's freestyle 125 kg ====
11 May

Round of 16
Leonidas Manzana (ECU)	0
José Daniel Díaz (VEN)	10

Quarterfinals
Jonovan Smith (PUR)	0
José Daniel Díaz (VEN)	3
Maxwell Lacey (CRC)	0
Wyatt Hendrickson (USA)	11^{F}
Rizieri Chávez (MEX)	0
Richard DesChatelets (CAN)	11
Gino Ávila (HON)	10
Gabriel Silva (BRA)	0

Semifinals
José Daniel Díaz (VEN)	0
Wyatt Hendrickson (USA)	11
Richard DesChatelets (CAN)	14
Gino Ávila (HON)	2

Final
Wyatt Hendrickson (USA)	9^{F}
Richard DesChatelets (CAN)	0

Bronze medal match
Maxwell Lacey (CRC)	2
José Daniel Díaz (VEN)	3
Rizieri Chávez (MEX)	0
Gino Ávila (HON)	10

=== Men's Greco-Roman ===
==== Men's Greco-Roman 55 kg ====
8 May

Pos	Athlete	Pld	W	L	CP	TP	USA	MEX
1	Jayden Raney (USA)	1	1	0	4	10	—	10–1
2	Isaac Marín (MEX)	1	0	1	1	1	1–4 SU1	—

Source: UWW

==== Men's Greco-Roman 60 kg ====
8 May

Pos	Athlete	Pld	W	L	CP	TP	USA	BRA	PAN
1	Maxwell Black (USA)	2	2	0	8	22	—	8–0	14–5
2	Pedro Rodrigues (BRA)	2	1	1	4	14	0–4 SU	—	14–4
3	Andrés González (PAN)	2	0	2	2	9	1–4 SU1	1–4 SU1	—

Source: UWW

Pos	Athlete	Pld	W	L	CP	TP	MEX	VEN	ECU
1	Alexis Rodríguez (MEX)	2	2	0	8	16	—	8–0	8–0
2	Yonaiker Martínez (VEN)	2	1	1	4	8	0–4 SU	—	8–0
3	Patrick Rodríguez (ECU)	2	0	2	0	0	0–4 SU	0–4 SU	—

Source: UWW

Semifinals
Maxwell Black (USA)	3
Yonaiker Martínez (VEN)	1
Alexis Rodríguez (MEX)	4
Pedro Rodrigues (BRA)	2

Final
Maxwell Black (USA)	9
Alexis Rodríguez (MEX)	0
Bronze medal
Yonaiker Martínez (VEN)	5
Pedro Rodrigues (BRA)	1

==== Men's Greco-Roman 63 kg ====
8 May

Pos	Athlete	Pld	W	L	CP	TP	USA	BRA	PAN
1	Ellis Coleman (USA)	2	2	0	8	7	—	7–1	WO
2	Hector Sánchez (MEX)	2	1	1	6	1	1–3 PO1	—	WO
—	Lisandro Cabrera (PAR)	2	0	2	0	0	0–5 FO	0–5 FO	—

Source: UWW

Pos	Athlete	Pld	W	L	CP	TP	ECU	CHI	GUA
1	Jeremy Peralta (ECU)	2	2	0	8	22	—	11–0	11–3
2	Matías Muñoz (CHI)	2	1	1	3	3	0–4 SU	—	3–1
3	Emerson Felipe (GUA)	2	0	2	2	4	1–4 SU1	1–3 PO1	—

Source: UWW

Semifinals
Ellis Coleman (USA)	6^{F}
Matías Muñoz (CHI)	0
Jeremy Peralta (ECU)	9
Hector Sánchez (MEX)	0

Final
Ellis Coleman (USA)	4
Jeremy Peralta (ECU)	12
Bronze medal
Matías Muñoz (CHI)	0
Hector Sánchez (MEX)	2

==== Men's Greco-Roman 67 kg ====
8 May

Round of 16
Royglen Temple (PAN)	4
Marco Fernández (PER)	5

Quarterfinals
Luis Orta (CUB)	9
Marco Fernández (PER)	0
João Vítor Silva (BRA)	6
Osvaldo Yáñez (MEX)	9
Néstor Almanza (CHI)	5
Neiser Marimón (VEN)	3
Alston Nutter (USA)	1
Andrés Montaño (ECU)	6

Semifinals
Luis Orta (CUB)	9
Osvaldo Yáñez (MEX)	0
Néstor Almanza (CHI)	7
Andrés Montaño (ECU)	1

Final
Luis Orta (CUB)	8
Néstor Almanza (CHI)	0

Bronze medal match
Marco Fernández (PER)	7
Osvaldo Yáñez (MEX)	1
Neiser Marimón (VEN)	3
Andrés Montaño (ECU)	0

==== Men's Greco-Roman 72 kg ====
9 May

Pos	Athlete	Pld	W	L	CP	TP	USA	PER	PAN
1	Alejandro Sancho (USA)	2	2	0	8	17	—	9–0	8–0
2	Nilton Soto (PER)	2	1	1	3	7	0–4 SU	—	7–0
3	Wilfrido Samaniego (PAN)	2	0	2	0	0	0–4 SU	0–3 PO	—

Source: UWW

Pos	Athlete	Pld	W	L	CP	TP	MEX	GUA	ECU
1	Irving Salazar (MEX)	2	2	0	7	15	—	7–2	8–0
2	Cristian Mejía (GUA)	2	1	1	5	10	1–3 PO1	—	8–0
3	Enrique Guallpa (ECU)	2	0	2	0	0	0–4 SU	0–4 SU	—

Source: UWW

Semifinals
Alejandro Sancho (USA)	9
Cristian Mejía (GUA)	0
Irving Salazar (MEX)	0
Nilton Soto (PER)	3

Final
Alejandro Sancho (USA)	8
Nilton Soto (PER)	0
Bronze medal
Cristian Mejía (GUA)	0
Irving Salazar (MEX)	9

==== Men's Greco-Roman 77 kg ====
8 May

Quarterfinals		Semifinals		Final
Kamal Bey (USA)	9
Ryan Cubas (PER)	0	Kamal Bey (USA)	11
Calebe Ferreira (BRA)	10	Calebe Ferreira (BRA)	2
Eduardo Bernal (CHI)	0			Kamal Bey (USA)	11
Emmanuel Benítez (MEX)	3			Arsen Julfalakyan (ARG)	7
Leomar Cordero (VEN)	5	Leomar Cordero (VEN)	0
Óscar Barrios (HON)	0	Arsen Julfalakyan (ARG)	9
Arsen Julfalakyan (ARG)	8

Bronze medals
Ryan Cubas (PER)	3
Calebe Ferreira (BRA)	11
Óscar Barrios (HON)	0
Leomar Cordero (VEN)	2

==== Men's Greco-Roman 82 kg ====
8 May

Pos	Athlete	Pld	W	L	CP	TP	USA	MEX	GUA
1	Beka Melelashvili (USA)	2	2	0	7	14	—	6–1	8–0
2	Diego Macías (MEX)	2	1	1	4	5	1–3 PO1	—	4–3
3	David Choc (GUA)	2	0	2	1	3	0–4 SU	1–3 PO1	—

Source: UWW

==== Men's Greco-Roman 87 kg ====
8 May

Pos	Athlete	Pld	W	L	CP	TP	VEN	USA	BRA	PER
1	Luis Avendaño (VEN)	3	3	0	9	17	—	7–5	6–3	4–1
2	Payton Jacobson (USA)	3	2	1	8	18	1–3 PO1	—	5–3	8–0
3	Sosruko Kodzokov (BRA)	3	1	2	6	14	1–3 PO1	1–3 PO1	—	8–0
4	Carlos Espinoza (PER)	3	0	3	1	1	1–3 PO1	0–4 SU	0–4 SU	—

Source: UWW

Pos	Athlete	Pld	W	L	CP	TP	HON	MEX	PAN
1	Ariel Alfonso (HON)	2	2	0	8	6	—	6–1	WO
2	José Andrés Vargas (MEX)	2	1	1	5	10	1–3 PO1	—	9–0
3	Eduardo Vega (PAN)	2	0	2	0	0	0–5 IN	0–4 SU	—

Source: UWW

Semifinals
Luis Avendaño (VEN)	6
José Andrés Vargas (MEX)	1
Ariel Alfonso (HON)	0
Payton Jacobson (USA)	8

Final
Luis Avendaño (VEN)	0
Payton Jacobson (USA)	6
Bronze medal
José Andrés Vargas (MEX)	2
Ariel Alfonso (HON)	1

==== Men's Greco-Roman 97 kg ====
9 May

Pos	Athlete	Pld	W	L	CP	TP	CUB	USA	ARG	VEN
1	Gabriel Rosillo (CUB)	3	3	0	12	26	—	10–0	8–0	8–0
2	Michial Foy (USA)	3	1	2	4	0	0–4 SU	—	1–5	6–1
3	Ricardo Gómez (ARG)	3	1	2	4	6	0–4 SU	3–1 PO1	—	1–4
4	Luillys Pérez (VEN)	3	1	2	4	5	0–4 SU	1–3 PO1	3–1 PO1	—

Source: UWW

Pos	Athlete	Pld	W	L	CP	TP	HON	MEX	PAN
1	Kevin Mejía (HON)	2	2	0	8	17	—	8–0	9–0
2	Dorian Trejo (MEX)	2	1	1	4	9	0–4 SU	—	9–0
3	Gabriel Lee (PAN)	2	0	2	0	0	0–4 SU	0–4 SU	—

Source: UWW

Semifinals
Gabriel Rosillo (CUB)	8
Dorian Trejo (MEX)	0
Kevin Mejía (HON)	8
Michial Foy (USA)	0

Final
Gabriel Rosillo (CUB)	5
Kevin Mejía (HON)	1
Bronze medal
Dorian Trejo (MEX)	0
Michial Foy (USA)	9

==== Men's Greco-Roman 130 kg ====
8 May

Quarterfinals		Semifinals		Final
Eduard Soghomonyan (BRA)	4
Diego Almendras (CHI)	1	Eduard Soghomonyan (BRA)	0
Óscar Pino (CUB)	9	Óscar Pino (CUB)	8
Moisés Pérez (VEN)	0			Óscar Pino (CUB)	3
Cohlton Schultz (USA)	5^{F}			Cohlton Schultz (USA)	1
Leonidas Manzana (ECU)	0	Cohlton Schultz (USA)	3^{F}
Gino Ávila (HON)	1	Gino Ávila (HON)	0
Paul Morales (MEX)	1

Bronze medals
Moisés Pérez (VEN)	6
Eduard Soghomonyan (BRA)	0
Leonidas Manzana (ECU)	0
Gino Ávila (HON)	9

=== Women's freestyle ===
==== Women's freestyle 50 kg ====
9 May

Round of 16
Mercedes Castillo (MEX)	1
Jacqueline Mollocana (ECU)	12

Quarterfinals
Yusneylys Guzmán (CUB)	7
Jacqueline Mollocana (ECU)	2
Audrey Jimenez (USA)	10
Yorlenis Morán (PAN)	0
Kamila Barbosa (BRA)	3^{F}
Antuaneth Casusol (PER)	0
Nohalis Loyo (VEN)	4
Madison Parks (CAN)	9

Semifinals
Yusneylys Guzmán (CUB)	8
Audrey Jimenez (USA)	18
Kamila Barbosa (BRA)	0
Madison Parks (CAN)	9

Final
Audrey Jimenez (USA)	4^{F}
Madison Parks (CAN)	2

Bronze medal match
Yorlenis Morán (PAN)	2
Yusneylys Guzmán (CUB)	12
Nohalis Loyo (VEN)	4
Kamila Barbosa (BRA)	1

==== Women's freestyle 53 kg ====
10 May

Round of 16
Sabrina Tapajós (BRA)	1
Serena Di Benedetto (CAN)	11

Quarterfinals
Lucía Yépez (ECU)	14
Serena Di Benedetto (CAN)	3
Nathaly Herrera (PER)	4
Jaslynn Gallegos (USA)	14
Mariana Rojas (VEN)	10
Josefina Ramírez (MEX)	0
Yusneiry Agrazal (PAN)	1
Adrianny Castillo (ARG)	12

Semifinals
Lucía Yépez (ECU)	10
Jaslynn Gallegos (USA)	0
Mariana Rojas (VEN)	10
Adrianny Castillo (ARG)	0

Final
Lucía Yépez (ECU)	7
Mariana Rojas (VEN)	0

Bronze medal match
Serena Di Benedetto (CAN)	4
Jaslynn Gallegos (USA)	16
Josefina Ramírez (MEX)	0
Adrianny Castillo (ARG)	4^{F}

==== Women's freestyle 55 kg ====
9 May

Pos	Athlete	Pld	W	L	CP	TP	CAN	USA	MEX	BRA
1	Karla Godinez (CAN)	3	3	0	12	31	—	10–0	10–0	11–0
2	Louisa Schwab (USA)	3	2	1	9	19	0–4 SU	—	14–4	5–6 Fall
3	Andrea Avelino (MEX)	3	1	2	6	14	0–4 SU	1–4 SU1	—	10–1 Fall
4	Geisa Veloso (BRA)	3	0	3	0	7	0–4 SU	0–5 FA	0–5 FA	—

Source: UWW

==== Women's freestyle 57 kg ====
9 May

Round of 16
Martha Olivares (PER)	0
Yaynelis Sanz (CUB)	10

Quarterfinals
Luisa Valverde (ECU)	3
Yaynelis Sanz (CUB)	6
Ana França (BRA)	4
Camila Amarilla (ARG)	1
Mia Friesen (CAN)	6
Mayra Parra (VEN)	3
Bertha Rojas (MEX)	6^{F}
Amanda Martinez (USA)	2

Semifinals
Yaynelis Sanz (CUB)	6
Ana França (BRA)	0
Mia Friesen (CAN)	2
Bertha Rojas (MEX)	6^{F}

Final
Yaynelis Sanz (CUB)	6
Bertha Rojas (MEX)	0

Repechage round 1
Martha Olivares (PER)	0
Luisa Valverde (ECU)	10

Bronze medal match
Luisa Valverde (ECU)	10
Ana França (BRA)	0
Amanda Martinez (USA)	12
Mia Friesen (CAN)	2

==== Women's freestyle 59 kg ====
10 May

Pos	Athlete	Pld	W	L	CP	TP	CAN	USA	MEX
1	Laurence Beauregard (CAN)	2	2	0	7	18	—	6–3	12–1
2	Abigail Nette (USA)	2	1	1	5	14	1–3 PO1	—	11–0
3	Alma Valencia (MEX)	2	0	2	1	1	1–4 SU1	0–4 SU	—

Source: UWW

==== Women's freestyle 62 kg ====
9 May

Pos	Athlete	Pld	W	L	CP	TP	CAN	MEX	ECU
1	Ana Godinez (CAN)	2	2	0	8	21	—	11–0	10–0
2	Melanie Jiménez (MEX)	2	1	1	4	10	0–4 SU	—	10–0
3	Leonela Gruezo (ECU)	2	0	2	0	0	0–4 SU	0–4 SU	—

Source: UWW

Pos	Athlete	Pld	W	L	CP	TP	VEN	USA	BRA
1	Astrid Montero (VEN)	2	2	0	9	18	—	10–0	8–0 Fall
2	Savannah Cosme (USA)	2	1	1	4	18	0–4 SU	—	18–8
3	Juliana Neper (BRA)	2	0	2	1	8	0–5 FA	1–4 SU1	—

Source: UWW

Semifinals
Ana Godinez (CAN)	6^{F}
Savannah Cosme (USA)	0
Astrid Montero (VEN)	2
Melanie Jiménez (MEX)	0

Final
Ana Godinez (CAN)	4^{F}
Astrid Montero (VEN)	4
Bronze medal
Savannah Cosme (USA)	0
Melanie Jiménez (MEX)	3

==== Women's freestyle 65 kg ====
10 May

Pos	Athlete	Pld	W	L	CP	TP	USA	CAN	MEX	BRA
1	Macey Kilty (USA)	3	3	0	13	22	—	10–0	10–0	2–2 Fall
2	Miki Rowbottom (CAN)	3	1	2	6	18	0–4 SU	—	2–3	16–5 Fall
3	Alexis Gómez (MEX)	3	1	2	4	5	0–4 SU	3–1 PO1	—	2–2
4	Letícia Piazza (BRA)	3	1	2	3	9	0–5 FA	0–5 FA	3–1 PO1	—

Source: UWW

==== Women's freestyle 68 kg ====
9 May

Pos	Athlete	Pld	W	L	CP	TP	USA	VEN	BRA
1	Kennedy Blades (USA)	2	2	0	7	17	—	6–2	11–1
2	Nathaly Grimán (VEN)	2	1	1	6	7	1–3 PO1	—	5–2 Fall
3	Gabriela Rocha (BRA)	2	0	2	1	3	1–4 SU1	0–5 FA	—

Source: UWW

Pos	Athlete	Pld	W	L	CP	TP	MEX	CHI	CAN
1	Debanhi Tapia (MEX)	2	2	0	8	9	—	2–2	7–3 Fall
2	Virginia Jiménez (CHI)	2	1	1	4	5	1–3 PO1	—	3–0
3	Vanessa Keefe (CAN)	2	0	2	0	3	0–5 FA	0–3 PO	—

Source: UWW

Semifinals
Kennedy Blades (USA)	10
Virginia Jiménez (CHI)	0
Debanhi Tapia (MEX)	0
Nathaly Grimán (VEN)	11

Final
Kennedy Blades (USA)	14
Nathaly Grimán (VEN)	5
Bronze medal
Virginia Jiménez (CHI)	4
Debanhi Tapia (MEX)	4

==== Women's freestyle 72 kg ====
9 May

Pos	Athlete	Pld	W	L	CP	TP	USA	CAN	MEX
1	Tiffany Baublitz (USA)	2	2	0	8	12	—	6–6	6–0 Fall
2	Nyla Burgess (CAN)	2	1	1	4	10	1–3 PO1	—	4–1
3	Michelle Olea (MEX)	2	0	2	1	1	0–5 FA	1–3 PO1	—

Source: UWW

==== Women's freestyle 76 kg ====
10 May

Quarterfinals		Semifinals		Final
Milaimys Marín (CUB)	10
Luz María Hernández (MEX)	0	Milaimys Marín (CUB)	6
Thamires Machado (BRA)	11	Thamires Machado (BRA)	9
Neirili Banguero (VEN)	0			Thamires Machado (BRA)	1
Kylie Welker (USA)	8			Kylie Welker (USA)	8
Linda Machuca (ARG)	2	Kylie Welker (USA)	10
Vianne Rouleau (CAN)	0	Génesis Reasco (ECU)	0
Génesis Reasco (ECU)	10

Bronze medals
Neirili Banguero (VEN)	0
Milaimys Marín (CUB)	10
Linda Machuca (ARG)	0
Génesis Reasco (ECU)	6
