= Tatiana Hurtado =

Colombian freestyle wrestler

Personal information
- Full name: Tatiana Hurtado Lerma

Sport
- Country: Colombia
- Sport: Amateur wrestling
- Weight class: 57 kg; 59 kg
- Event: Freestyle
Medal record
Representing Colombia
Women's freestyle wrestling
Event	1st	2nd	3rd
CAC Games	0	0	1
South American Games	0	0	1
Bolivarian Games	0	1	0
Junior Pan American Games	0	1	0
U23 Pan American Championships	0	0	1
U20 Pan American Championships	0	0	2
Total	0	2	5
Central American and Caribbean Games
Bronze medal – third place	2026 Santo Domingo	57 kg
South American Games
Bronze medal – third place	2022 Asunción	57 kg
Bolivarian Games
Silver medal – second place	2022 Valledupar	57 kg
Junior Pan American Games
Silver medal – second place	2021 Cali-Valle	57 kg
U23 Pan American Championships
Bronze medal – third place	2026 Lima	59 kg
U20 Pan American Championships
Bronze medal – third place	2022 Oaxtepec	59 kg
Bronze medal – third place	2023 Santiago	57 kg

Tatiana Hurtado Lerma is a Colombian freestyle wrestler. She won the silver medal in the women's 57 kg event at the 2022 Bolivarian Games held in Valledupar, Colombia. She won one of the bronze medals in her event at the 2022 South American Games held in Asunción, Paraguay.

In 2021, she won the silver medal in the women's 57 kg event at the Junior Pan American Games held in Cali, Colombia.

She competed in the women's 55 kg event at the 2022 U23 World Wrestling Championships held in Pontevedra, Spain.

== Achievements ==
Year	Tournament	Location	Result	Event
Representing Colombia
2021	Junior Pan American Games	Cali, Colombia	2nd	Freestyle 57 kg
2022	Bolivarian Games	Valledupar, Colombia	2nd	Freestyle 57 kg
2022	U20 Pan American Championships	Oaxtepec, Mexico	3rd	Freestyle 59 kg
2022	South American Games	Asunción, Paraguay	3rd	Freestyle 57 kg
2023	U20 Pan American Championships	Santiago, Chile	3rd	Freestyle 57 kg
2026	U23 Pan American Championships	Lima, Peru	3rd	Freestyle 59 kg
2026	Central American and Caribbean Games	Santo Domingo, Dominican Republic	3rd	Freestyle 57 kg
