= Nishan Randhawa =

Canadian freestyle wrestler

Personal information
- Born: 5 December 1997 (age 28)
- Height: 188 cm (6 ft 2 in)

Sport
- Country: Canada
- Sport: Wrestling
- Weight class: 97 kg
Medal record
Men's freestyle wrestling
Representing Canada
Pan American Championships
Bronze medal – third place	2025 Monterrey	97 kg
Pan American Games
Bronze medal – third place	2023 Santiago	97 kg
Commonwealth Games
Gold medal – first place	2022 Birmingham	97 kg

Nishan Singh Randhawa (born 5 December 1997) is a Canadian freestyle wrestler. He won one of the bronze medals in men's 97 kg event at the 2023 Pan American Games held in Santiago, Chile.

== Career ==
He participated in the 2022 Commonwealth Games in the wrestling competition, being awarded the gold medal in the men's freestyle 97 kg event.

He competed in the 97 kg event at the 2022 World Wrestling Championships held in Belgrade, Serbia.

In 2024, Randhawa competed at the Pan American Wrestling Olympic Qualification Tournament held in Acapulco, Mexico hoping to qualify for the 2024 Summer Olympics in Paris, France. He was eliminated in his first match. Randhawa also competed at the 2024 World Wrestling Olympic Qualification Tournament held in Istanbul, Turkey without qualifying for the Olympics.

== Personal life ==
Randhawa is of Punjabi sikh descent.
