= Luis Miguel Pérez =

Dominican Republic wrestler (born 1988)

Personal information
- Full name: Luis Miguel Pérez Sosa
- Born: 8 November 1988 (age 37)
- Height: 185 cm (6 ft 1 in) (2019)

Sport
- Sport: Freestyle wrestling
- Weight class: -97 kg
Medal record
Men's freestyle wrestling
Representing Dominican Republic
Pan American Games
Bronze medal – third place	2019 Lima	-97 kg
Central American and Caribbean Games
Bronze medal – third place	2023 San Salvador	-97 kg
Bronze medal – third place	2026 Santo Domingo	-97 kg
Bolivarian Games
Bronze medal – third place	2013 Trujillo	-96 kg
Silver medal – second place	2017 Santa Marta	-97 kg
Silver medal – second place	2022 Valledupar	-97 kg
Pan American Championships
Silver medal – second place	2017 Lauro de Freitas	-97 kg
Bronze medal – third place	2020 Ottawa	-97 kg
Silver medal – second place	2021 Ciudad de Guatemala	-97 kg
Bronze medal – third place	2022 Acapulco	-97 kg
Bronze medal – third place	2023 Buenos Aires	-97 kg
Bronze medal – third place	2024 Acapulco	-97 kg
Bronze medal – third place	2026 Coralville	97 kg
South American Championships
Silver medal – second place	2012 Callao	-84 kg
Silver medal – second place	2014 Lima	-97 kg

Luis Miguel Pérez Sosa (Note: In this Spanish name, the first or paternal surname is Pérez and the second or maternal family name is Sosa.) (born 8 November 1988) is a Dominican wrestler. Perez represented the Dominican Republic at the 2024 Summer Olympics, qualifying through the pre-Olympics tournament in Acapulco, Mexico. His qualification made him the first wrestler from the Dominican Republic to qualify for the Olympic Games since Jansel Ramírez in 2004. In the men's 97kg freestyle wrestling event, Perez lost in the first round of the tournament to Magomedkhan Magomedov.

In 2026, Perez earned a bronze medal at the 2026 CAC Games in Santo Domingo.
