= José Daniel Díaz =

Venezuelan freestyle wrestler

Personal information
- Full name: José Daniel Díaz Robertti
- Born: 22 February 1989 (age 37) Acarigua, Portuguesa, Venezuela
- Height: 1.81 m (5 ft 11 1/2 in)
- Weight: 86 kg (190 lb)

Sport
- Sport: Wrestling
- Event: Freestyle
Medal record
Representing Venezuela
Men's freestyle wrestling
Pan American Championships
Silver medal – second place	2023 Buenos Aires	125 kg
Bronze medal – third place	2022 Acapulco	125 kg
Bronze medal – third place	2024 Acapulco	125 kg
Bronze medal – third place	2025 Monterrey	125 kg
Bronze medal – third place	2026 Coralville	125 kg
Pan American Games
Silver medal – second place	2019 Lima	97 kg
Silver medal – second place	2023 Santiago	125 kg
Bronze medal – third place	2011 Guadalajara	84 kg
South American Games
Gold medal – first place	2018 Cochabamba	97 kg
Gold medal – first place	2022 Asunción	125 kg
Gold medal – first place	2026 Santa Fe	125 kg
Central American and Caribbean Games
Gold medal – first place	2023 San Salvador	125 kg
Gold medal – first place	2026 Santo Domingo	125 kg
Bronze medal – third place	2014 Veracruz	97 kg
Bronze medal – third place	2018 Barranquilla	97 kg
Bolivarian Games
Gold medal – first place	2025 Ayacucho-Lima	125 kg
Dan Kolov & Nikola Petrov Tournament
Silver medal – second place	2021 Plovdiv	125 kg
Grand Prix
Silver medal – second place	2026 Madrid	125 kg
Men's Greco-Roman wrestling
Bolivarian Games
Gold medal – first place	2017 Santa Marta	97 kg
Silver medal – second place	2022 Valledupar	130 kg
Men's Beach wrestling
Pan American Championships
Gold medal – first place	2025 Queretaro	+90 kg
South American Beach Games
Gold medal – first place	2023 Santa Marta	+90 kg
Central American and Caribbean Beach Games
Gold medal – first place	2022 Santa Marta	+90 kg
Beach Wrestling World Series
Gold medal – first place	2024 Acapulco	+90 kg

José Daniel Díaz Robertti (Note: In this Spanish name, the first or paternal surname is Díaz and the second or maternal family name is Robertti.) (born 22 February 1989) is an amateur Venezuelan freestyle wrestler, who competed in the men's light heavyweight category before moving up to the heavyweight category. He won a bronze medal in the light heavyweight division at the 2011 Pan American Games in Guadalajara, Mexico.

== Career ==
Diaz represented Venezuela at the 2012 Summer Olympics in London, where he competed in the men's 84 kg class. He received a bye for the preliminary round of sixteen match, before losing out to Latvia's Armands Zvirbulis, with a three-set technical score (1–0, 0–1, 0–1), and a classification point score of 1–3.

At the 2016 Olympics, he competed in the men's heavyweight category. There, he lost in the second round to Mamed Ibragimov.

In 2024, he won a bronze medal in men's 125 kg event at the 2024 Pan American Wrestling Championships held in Acapulco, Mexico. He competed at the Pan American Wrestling Olympic Qualification Tournament held in Acapulco, Mexico hoping to qualify for the 2024 Summer Olympics in Paris, France. He was eliminated in his first match.
