= 2019 Pan American Wrestling Championships =

2019 Pan American Championship
- Host city: Buenos Aires, Argentina
- Dates: 19–21 April
- Stadium: Polideportivo (CENARD)

Champions
- Freestyle: United States
- Greco-Roman: United States
- Women: United States

The 2019 Pan American Wrestling Championships was held in Buenos Aires, Argentina, from 19 to 21 April 2019.

The top three countries in the 18 weight categories scheduled to be held at the 2019 Pan American Games (also in Lima) will qualify for the Pan American Games. If Peru has not qualified at the end of the 2019 Pan American Championships, the third spot available at the tournament will be awarded to Peru.

The USA has become the first time in history that a team has won every gold in a freestyle style at the Pan Am Championships.

== Medal table ==
* Host nation (Argentina)

Rank	Nation	Gold	Silver	Bronze	Total
1	United States (USA)	19	7	2	28
2	Cuba (CUB)	5	5	5	15
3	Canada (CAN)	2	6	6	14
4	Ecuador (ECU)	2	2	1	5
5	Brazil (BRA)	1	2	5	8
6	Venezuela (VEN)	1	1	7	9
7	Puerto Rico (PUR)	0	2	5	7
8	Colombia (COL)	0	2	2	4
9	Argentina (ARG)*	0	1	5	6
10	Peru (PER)	0	1	4	5
11	Mexico (MEX)	0	1	3	4
12	Dominican Republic (DOM)	0	0	1	1
12	Honduras (HON)	0	0	1	1
12	Paraguay (PAR)	0	0	1	1
Totals (14 entries)		30	30	48	108

== Team ranking ==
Rank	Men's freestyle		Men's Greco-Roman		Women's freestyle	
Rank	Team	Points	Team	Points	Team	Points
1	United States	250	United States	205	United States	200
2	Canada	129	Cuba	135	Canada	129
3	Cuba	115	Brazil	98	Ecuador	89
4	Puerto Rico	72	Venezuela	84	Brazil	89
5	Venezuela	68	Mexico	64	Cuba	86
6	Argentina	53	Peru	61	Peru	54
7	Colombia	48	Colombia	48	Venezuela	52
8	Brazil	41	Argentina	47	Argentina	47
9	Dominican Republic	37	Dominican Republic	46	Puerto Rico	45
10	Peru	37	Ecuador	43	Mexico	45

== Medalists ==
=== Men's freestyle ===
Event	Gold	Silver	Bronze
57 kg	Joshua Rodriguez; United States	Óscar Tigreros; Colombia	Reineri Andreu; Cuba
57 kg	Joshua Rodriguez; United States	Óscar Tigreros; Colombia	Pedro Mejías; Venezuela
61 kg	Joe Colon; United States	Yowlys Bonne; Cuba	Scott Schiller; Canada
65 kg	Colton McCrystal; United States	Damián Solenzal; Cuba	Agustín Destribats; Argentina
65 kg	Colton McCrystal; United States	Damián Solenzal; Cuba	Mauricio Sánchez; Ecuador
70 kg	Anthony Ashnault; United States	Nicholas Rowe; Canada	Mitchel Taipe; Peru
74 kg	Jordan Burroughs; United States	Jevon Balfour; Canada	Julio Rodríguez; Dominican Republic
74 kg	Jordan Burroughs; United States	Jevon Balfour; Canada	Franklin Gómez; Puerto Rico
79 kg	Chandler Rogers; United States	Santiago Martínez; Colombia	Jasmit Phulka; Canada
86 kg	David Taylor; United States	Pedro Ceballos; Venezuela	Alex Moore; Canada
86 kg	David Taylor; United States	Pedro Ceballos; Venezuela	Lázaro Hernández; Cuba
92 kg	J'den Cox; United States	Jaime Espinal; Puerto Rico	Diego Ramírez; Paraguay
97 kg	Kyle Snyder; United States	Reineris Salas; Cuba	José Daniel Díaz; Venezuela
97 kg	Kyle Snyder; United States	Reineris Salas; Cuba	Evan Ramos; Puerto Rico
125 kg	Nick Gwiazdowski; United States	Korey Jarvis; Canada	Óscar Pino; Cuba
125 kg	Nick Gwiazdowski; United States	Korey Jarvis; Canada	Antoine Jaoude; Brazil

=== Men's Greco-Roman ===
Event	Gold	Silver	Bronze
55 kg	Max Nowry; United States	Sargis Khachatryan; Brazil	Joshua Medina; Puerto Rico
60 kg	Luis Orta; Cuba	Samuel Gurria; Mexico	Dicther Toro; Colombia
60 kg	Luis Orta; Cuba	Samuel Gurria; Mexico	Anthony Palencia; Venezuela
63 kg	Andrés Montaño; Ecuador	Ryan Mango; United States	José Dávila; Peru
67 kg	Ismael Borrero; Cuba	Ellis Coleman; United States	Joílson Júnior; Brazil
67 kg	Ismael Borrero; Cuba	Ellis Coleman; United States	Shalom Villegas; Venezuela
72 kg	RaVaughn Perkins; United States	Kenedy Pedrosa; Brazil	Francisco Barrio; Argentina
77 kg	Yosvanys Peña; Cuba	Kamal Bey; United States	Jair Cuero; Colombia
77 kg	Yosvanys Peña; Cuba	Kamal Bey; United States	Juan Ángel Escobar; Mexico
82 kg	Cheney Haight; United States	Carlos Espinoza; Peru	Adil Machado; Brazil
87 kg	Luis Avendaño; Venezuela	Antonio Durán; Cuba	Patrick Martinez; United States
87 kg	Luis Avendaño; Venezuela	Antonio Durán; Cuba	Alfonso Leyva; Mexico
97 kg	Gabriel Rosillo; Cuba	G'Angelo Hancock; United States	Luillys Pérez; Venezuela
97 kg	Gabriel Rosillo; Cuba	G'Angelo Hancock; United States	Kevin Mejía; Honduras
130 kg	Adam Coon; United States	Luciano del Río; Argentina	Edgardo López; Puerto Rico
130 kg	Adam Coon; United States	Luciano del Río; Argentina	Ángel Pacheco; Cuba

=== Women's freestyle ===
Event	Gold	Silver	Bronze
50 kg	Yusneylys Guzmán; Cuba	Erin Golston; United States	Patricia Bermúdez; Argentina
50 kg	Yusneylys Guzmán; Cuba	Erin Golston; United States	Thalía Mallqui; Peru
53 kg	Sarah Hildebrandt; United States	Luisa Valverde; Ecuador	Lilianet Duanes; Cuba
53 kg	Sarah Hildebrandt; United States	Luisa Valverde; Ecuador	Diana Weicker; Canada
55 kg	Alexandra Hedrick; United States	Jayd Davis; Canada	Nerina Azerrad; Argentina
57 kg	Lissette Antes; Ecuador	Hannah Taylor; Canada	Betzabeth Sarco; Venezuela
57 kg	Lissette Antes; Ecuador	Hannah Taylor; Canada	Jacarra Winchester; United States
59 kg	Laurence Beauregard; Canada	Andribeth Rivera; Puerto Rico	Karoline Santana; Brazil
62 kg	Laís Nunes; Brazil	Mallory Velte; United States	Abnelis Yambo; Puerto Rico
62 kg	Laís Nunes; Brazil	Mallory Velte; United States	Nathaly Grimán; Venezuela
65 kg	Julia Salata; United States	Jessica Brouillette; Canada	Gabriela Rocha; Brazil
68 kg	Tamyra Mensah; United States	Yudari Sánchez; Cuba	Ámbar Garnica; Mexico
68 kg	Tamyra Mensah; United States	Yudari Sánchez; Cuba	Olivia Di Bacco; Canada
72 kg	Dejah Slater; Canada	Rachel Watters; United States	Linda Machuca; Argentina
76 kg	Adeline Gray; United States	Génesis Reasco; Ecuador	Diana Cruz; Peru
76 kg	Adeline Gray; United States	Génesis Reasco; Ecuador	Erica Wiebe; Canada

== Results ==
=== Men's freestyle ===
==== 57 kg ====
April 21

Round of 16
Reineri Andreu (CUB)	2
Joshua Rodriguez (USA)	7
Óscar Tigreros (COL)	10
Daniel Nascimento (BRA)	6
Álex Fernández (DOM)	8
Roberto Blanco (MEX)	10
Cristian Mox (GUA)	10
Jonathan Prata (ARG)	8
Pedro Mejías (VEN)	6
Samuel Alva (PER)	4

Quarterfinals
Diego Ramírez-Medina (PUR)	0
Darthe Capellan (CAN)	10
Lucas Navarrete (ECU)	0
Joshua Rodriguez (USA)	10
Óscar Tigreros (COL)	6
Roberto Blanco (MEX)	4
Cristian Mox (GUA)	0
Pedro Mejías (VEN)	5

Semifinals
Darthe Capellan (CAN)	4
Joshua Rodriguez (USA)	6
Óscar Tigreros (COL)	10
Pedro Mejías (VEN)	8

Final
Joshua Rodriguez (USA)	11
Óscar Tigreros (COL)	0

Repechage round 1
Reineri Andreu (CUB)	14
Lucas Navarrete (ECU)	3
Daniel Nascimento (BRA)	WO
Roberto Blanco (MEX)

Bronze medal match
Reineri Andreu (CUB)	4
Darthe Capellan (CAN)	0
Daniel Nascimento (BRA)	0
Pedro Mejías (VEN)	10

==== 61 kg ====
April 21

Pos	Athlete	Pld	W	L	CP	TP
1	Joe Colon (USA)	3	3	0	11	29
2	Yowlys Bonne (CUB)	3	2	1	9	18
3	Scott Schiller (CAN)	3	1	2	4	10
4	Juan Antonio Rodríguez (ESA)	3	0	3	0	0

Round 1–3
Joe Colon (USA)	9–3	Yowlys Bonne (CUB)
Juan Antonio Rodríguez (ESA)	0–10	Scott Schiller (CAN)
Joe Colon (USA)	10–0	Juan Antonio Rodríguez (ESA)
Yowlys Bonne (CUB)	7–0	Scott Schiller (CAN)
Joe Colon (USA)	10–0	Scott Schiller (CAN)
Yowlys Bonne (CUB)	8–0 Fall	Juan Antonio Rodríguez (ESA)

==== 65 kg ====
April 21

Round of 16
Agustín Destribats (ARG)	10
Marcos Siqueira (BRA)	0
Erick Romero (NCA)	0
Úber Cuero (COL)	2^{F}
Anthony Montero (VEN)	4
Daniel Brioso (DOM)	9^{F}
Brandon Díaz (MEX)	6^{F}
Rodrigo Denis (PAR)	0
Damián Solenzal (CUB)	10
Enrique Pérez (GUA)	0
Dillon Williams (CAN)	9
Mauricio Sánchez (ECU)	16

Quarterfinals
Colton McCrystal (USA)	11
Sixto Auccapiña (PER)	0
Agustín Destribats (ARG)	4
Úber Cuero (COL)	2
Daniel Brioso (DOM)	2
Brandon Díaz (MEX)	1
Damián Solenzal (CUB)	10
Mauricio Sánchez (ECU)	3

Semifinals
Colton McCrystal (USA)	15
Agustín Destribats (ARG)	6
Daniel Brioso (DOM)	2
Damián Solenzal (CUB)	3

Final
Colton McCrystal (USA)	12
Damián Solenzal (CUB)	1

Repechage round 1
Enrique Pérez (GUA)	3
Mauricio Sánchez (ECU)	15

Bronze medal match
Sixto Auccapiña (PER)	5
Agustín Destribats (ARG)	16
Mauricio Sánchez (ECU)	9
Daniel Brioso (DOM)	5

==== 70 kg ====
April 21

Pos	Athlete	Pld	W	L	CP	TP
1	Anthony Ashnault (USA)	4	4	0	17	36
2	Nicholas Rowe (CAN)	4	3	1	14	26
3	Mitchel Taipe (PER)	4	2	2	7	26
4	Hugo Viana (BRA)	4	1	3	4	9
5	Cristian Karlikowski (ARG)	4	0	4	2	6

Round 1–5
Mitchel Taipe (PER)	12–5	Cristian Karlikowski (ARG)
Nicholas Rowe (CAN)	2–12	Anthony Ashnault (USA)
Hugo Viana (BRA)	1–14	Mitchel Taipe (PER)
Cristian Karlikowski (ARG)	0–10	Nicholas Rowe (CAN)
Anthony Ashnault (USA)	4–0 Fall	Mitchel Taipe (PER)
Hugo Viana (BRA)	8–1	Cristian Karlikowski (ARG)
Nicholas Rowe (CAN)	10–0	Mitchel Taipe (PER)
Anthony Ashnault (USA)	10–0	Hugo Viana (BRA)
Cristian Karlikowski (ARG)	0–10	Anthony Ashnault (USA)
Nicholas Rowe (CAN)	4–0 Fall	Hugo Viana (BRA)

==== 74 kg ====
April 21

Round of 16
Abel Herrera (PER)	0
Jevon Balfour (CAN)	10
Néstor Tafur (COL)	7
Jorge Despaigne (CUB)	11
Jorge Llano (ARG)	20
Marcus Calasans (BRA)	12
Adonis Arroyo (VEN)	5
León Peralta (CHI)	4
David Choc (GUA)
Alberto Mendieta (NCA)	WO
Víctor Hernández (MEX)	0
Franklin Gómez (PUR)	10
Jordan Burroughs (USA)	10
Freddy Vera (ECU)	0

Quarterfinals
Julio Rodríguez (DOM)	0
Jevon Balfour (CAN)	11
Jorge Despaigne (CUB)	2
Jorge Llano (ARG)	1
Adonis Arroyo (VEN)	10
Alberto Mendieta (NCA)	0
Franklin Gómez (PUR)	2
Jordan Burroughs (USA)	5

Semifinals
Jevon Balfour (CAN)	10
Jorge Despaigne (CUB)	0
Adonis Arroyo (VEN)	0
Jordan Burroughs (USA)	10

Final
Jevon Balfour (CAN)	0
Jordan Burroughs (USA)	7

Repechage round 1
Abel Herrera (PER)	0
Julio Rodríguez (DOM)	11
Freddy Vera (ECU)	0
Franklin Gómez (PUR)	10

Bronze medal match
Julio Rodríguez (DOM)	10
Jorge Despaigne (CUB)	0
Franklin Gómez (PUR)	10
Adonis Arroyo (VEN)	0

==== 79 kg ====
April 20

Pos	Athlete	Pld	W	L	CP	TP
1	Chandler Rogers (USA)	3	3	0	12	24
2	Santiago Martínez (COL)	3	2	1	9	16
3	Jasmit Phulka (CAN)	3	1	2	5	13
4	Francisco Guzmán (PUR)	3	0	3	0	0

Round 1–3
Santiago Martínez (COL)	4–0 Fall	Francisco Guzmán (PUR)
Chandler Rogers (USA)	10–0	Jasmit Phulka (CAN)
Santiago Martínez (COL)	6–8	Chandler Rogers (USA)
Francisco Guzmán (PUR)	0–11	Jasmit Phulka (CAN)
Santiago Martínez (COL)	6–2	Jasmit Phulka (CAN)
Francisco Guzmán (PUR)	0–6 Fall	Chandler Rogers (USA)

==== 86 kg ====
April 21

Round of 16
Gino Ávila (HON)	5
Ethan Ramos (PUR)	16
Angus Arthur (JAM)	12
Pedro Rocha (BRA)	2
Pedro Ceballos (VEN)	7
Christian Anguiano (MEX)	4
Juan Martínez (COL)	3
Meruzhan Nikoyan (ARG)	8
Rashji Mackey (BAH)	0
David Taylor (USA)	8^{F}
Eduardo Gajardo (CHI)	1
Lázaro Hernández (CUB)	12
Pool Ambrocio (PER)	WO
Alejandro Villagómez (ECU)

Quarterfinals
Alex Moore (CAN)	16
Ethan Ramos (PUR)	10^{R}
Angus Arthur (JAM)	3
Pedro Ceballos (VEN)	6
Meruzhan Nikoyan (ARG)	0
David Taylor (USA)	6^{F}
Lázaro Hernández (CUB)	WO
Pool Ambrocio (PER)

Semifinals
Alex Moore (CAN)	1
Pedro Ceballos (VEN)	12
David Taylor (USA)	10
Lázaro Hernández (CUB)	0

Final
Pedro Ceballos (VEN)	0
David Taylor (USA)	10

Repechage round 1
Christian Anguiano (MEX)	13
Angus Arthur (JAM)	0
Rashji Mackey (BAH)	0
Meruzhan Nikoyan (ARG)	10

Bronze medal match
Christian Anguiano (MEX)	0
Alex Moore (CAN)	11
Meruzhan Nikoyan (ARG)	0
Lázaro Hernández (CUB)	10

==== 92 kg ====
April 20

Pos	Athlete	Pld	W	L	CP	TP
1	J'den Cox (USA)	2	2	0	8	12
2	Jaime Espinal (PUR)	2	1	1	5	2
3	Diego Ramírez (PAR)	2	0	2	0	0

Round 1–3
Jaime Espinal (PUR)	0–8	J'den Cox (USA)
Diego Ramírez (PAR)	0–2 Fall	Jaime Espinal (PUR)
J'den Cox (USA)	4–0 Fall	Diego Ramírez (PAR)

==== 97 kg ====
April 21

Round of 16
Ricardo Báez (ARG)	4
Maxwell Lacey (CRC)	14
Reineris Salas (CUB)	10
Cristhian Alquinga (ECU)	0
José Daniel Díaz (VEN)	10
Matías Uribe (CHI)	0
Miguel Sánchez (MEX)	0
Luis Miguel Pérez (DOM)	11

Quarterfinals
Kyle Snyder (USA)	11
Evan Ramos (PUR)	1
Jordan Steen (CAN)	8^{F}
Kensil Grajales (PER)	0
Maxwell Lacey (CRC)	0
Reineris Salas (CUB)	10
José Daniel Díaz (VEN)	6
Luis Miguel Pérez (DOM)	3

Semifinals
Kyle Snyder (USA)	10
Jordan Steen (CAN)	0
Reineris Salas (CUB)	6
José Daniel Díaz (VEN)	1

Final
Kyle Snyder (USA)	WO
Reineris Salas (CUB)

Repechage round 1
Cristhian Alquinga (ECU)	0
Maxwell Lacey (CRC)	10

Bronze medal match
Evan Ramos (PUR)	8
Jordan Steen (CAN)	5
Maxwell Lacey (CRC)	0
José Daniel Díaz (VEN)	10

==== 125 kg ====
April 21

Round of 16
Nick Gwiazdowski (USA)	10
Marcos Santos (PUR)	0
Óscar Pino (CUB)	13
Catriel Muriel (ARG)	2
Luis Vivenes (VEN)	4
Andrew Gunning (PER)	1

Quarterfinals
Korey Jarvis (CAN)	6^{F}
Cristian Estrella (ECU)	0
José Erazo (ESA)	0
Antoine Jaoude (BRA)	11
Eduardo García (MEX)	0
Nick Gwiazdowski (USA)	10
Óscar Pino (CUB)	11
Luis Vivenes (VEN)	0

Semifinals
Korey Jarvis (CAN)	11
Antoine Jaoude (BRA)	0
Nick Gwiazdowski (USA)	11
Óscar Pino (CUB)	1

Final
Korey Jarvis (CAN)	0
Nick Gwiazdowski (USA)	10

Repechage round 1
Marcos Santos (PUR)	3
Eduardo García (MEX)	5

Bronze medal match
Cristian Estrella (ECU)	1
Antoine Jaoude (BRA)	12
Eduardo García (MEX)	0
Óscar Pino (CUB)	8^{F}

=== Men's Greco-Roman ===
==== 55 kg ====
April 18

Pos	Athlete	Pld	W	L	CP	TP
1	Max Nowry (USA)	3	3	0	11	21
2	Sargis Khachatryan (BRA)	3	2	1	9	22
3	Joshua Medina (PUR)	3	1	2	3	14
4	Marcelo Torres (ARG)	3	0	3	1	5

Round 1–3
Marcelo Torres (ARG)	5–14	Joshua Medina (PUR)
Sargis Khachatryan (BRA)	3–4	Max Nowry (USA)
Marcelo Torres (ARG)	0–10	Sargis Khachatryan (BRA)
Joshua Medina (PUR)	0–9	Max Nowry (USA)
Marcelo Torres (ARG)	0–8	Max Nowry (USA)
Joshua Medina (PUR)	0–9	Sargis Khachatryan (BRA)

==== 60 kg ====
April 18

Round of 16
Diego Romanelli (BRA)	0
Anthony Palencia (VEN)	11
Juan Antonio Rodríguez (ESA)	0
Reydel Jiménez (GUA)	8
Luis Morales (ECU)	3
Dalton Roberts (USA)	12
Andrés González (PAN)
Luis Orta (CUB)	WO

Quarterfinals
Maikol Josefa (DOM)	1
Samuel Gurria (MEX)	6^{F}
Dicther Toro (COL)	8
Joao Benavides (PER)	0
Anthony Palencia (VEN)	14
Reydel Jiménez (GUA)	4
Dalton Roberts (USA)	0
Luis Orta (CUB)	8

Semifinals
Samuel Gurria (MEX)	9
Dicther Toro (COL)	6
Anthony Palencia (VEN)	4
Luis Orta (CUB)	7

Final
Samuel Gurria (MEX)	0
Luis Orta (CUB)	9

Repechage round 1
Andrés González (PAN)
Dalton Roberts (USA)	WO

Bronze medal match
Maikol Josefa (DOM)	3
Dicther Toro (COL)	4
Dalton Roberts (USA)	1
Anthony Palencia (VEN)	1

==== 63 kg ====
April 18

Pos	Athlete	Pld	W	L	CP	TP
1	Andrés Montaño (ECU)	3	3	0	12	28
2	Ryan Mango (USA)	3	2	1	8	18
3	José Dávila (PER)	3	1	2	5	9
4	Mauri Silvério (BRA)	3	0	3	0	0

Round 1–3
Ryan Mango (USA)	9–0	José Dávila (PER)
Mauri Silvério (BRA)	0–9	Andrés Montaño (ECU)
Ryan Mango (USA)	9–0	Mauri Silvério (BRA)
José Dávila (PER)	1–10	Andrés Montaño (ECU)
Ryan Mango (USA)	0–9	Andrés Montaño (ECU)
José Dávila (PER)	8–0	Mauri Silvério (BRA)

==== 67 kg ====
April 18

Round of 32
Germán Díaz (PUR)	9–6	Nilton Soto (PER)

Round of 16
Juan Carlos López (COL)	4
Harold Yedi (DOM)	7
Joílson Júnior (BRA)	8
Adán Monte (ARG)	0
Ismael Borrero (CUB)	9
Alejandro Varela (GUA)	0
Manuel López (MEX)	9
Luis Barrios (HON)	0
Alberto Mendieta (NCA)	0
Cristhian Rivas (ECU)	8
Cristóbal Torres (CHI)	WO
Alex Pineda (PAN)
Víctor López (ESA)	0
Ellis Coleman (USA)	9
Shalom Villegas (VEN)	10
Germán Díaz (PUR)	0

Quarterfinals
Harold Yedi (DOM)	1
Joílson Júnior (BRA)	10
Ismael Borrero (CUB)	8
Manuel López (MEX)	0
Cristhian Rivas (ECU)	10
Cristóbal Torres (CHI)	1
Ellis Coleman (USA)	11
Shalom Villegas (VEN)	0

Semifinals
Joílson Júnior (BRA)	2
Ismael Borrero (CUB)	4
Cristhian Rivas (ECU)	0
Ellis Coleman (USA)	10

Final
Ismael Borrero (CUB)	13
Ellis Coleman (USA)	1

Repechage round 1
Alejandro Varela (GUA)	2
Manuel López (MEX)	11
Víctor López (ESA)
Shalom Villegas (VEN)	WO

Bronze medal match
Manuel López (MEX)	1
Joílson Júnior (BRA)	3
Shalom Villegas (VEN)	8
Cristhian Rivas (ECU)	0

==== 72 kg ====
April 18

Pos	Athlete	Pld	W	L	CP	TP
1	RaVaughn Perkins (USA)	2	2	0	9	14
2	Kenedy Pedrosa (BRA)	2	1	1	3	10
3	Francisco Barrio (ARG)	2	0	2	1	4

Round 1–3
RaVaughn Perkins (USA)	6–0 Fall	Francisco Barrio (ARG)
Kenedy Pedrosa (BRA)	0–8	RaVaughn Perkins (USA)
Francisco Barrio (ARG)	4–10	Kenedy Pedrosa (BRA)

==== 77 kg ====
April 19

Round of 16
Cristian Karlikowski (ARG)	0
Yosvany Peña (CUB)	8
Juan Ángel Escobar (MEX)	7
Ângelo Moreira (BRA)	3
Enrique Cuero (ECU)	0
Kamal Bey (USA)	8
David Choc (GUA)	9
Cristian Nova (BOL)	0
Jeancarlo Canchumanta (PER)	8
Marciano Ali (PUR)	0

Quarterfinals
Wuileixis Rivas (VEN)	3
Johan Batista (DOM)	4
Jair Cuero (COL)	0
Yosvanys Peña (CUB)	9
Juan Ángel Escobar (MEX)	0
Kamal Bey (USA)	10
David Choc (GUA)	8
Jeancarlo Canchumanta (PER)	0

Semifinals
Johan Batista (DOM)	0
Yosvanys Peña (CUB)	10
Kamal Bey (USA)	5
David Choc (GUA)	3

Final
Yosvanys Peña (CUB)	3
Kamal Bey (USA)	1

Repechage round 1
Cristian Karlikowski (ARG)	0
Jair Cuero (COL)	8
Enrique Cuero (ECU)	2
Juan Ángel Escobar (MEX)	10

Bronze medal match
Jair Cuero (COL)	6
Johan Batista (DOM)	5
Juan Ángel Escobar (MEX)	10
David Choc (GUA)	0

==== 82 kg ====
April 19

Pos	Athlete	Pld	W	L	CP	TP
1	Cheney Haight (USA)	2	2	0	7	11
2	Carlos Espinoza (PER)	2	1	1	5	10
3	Adil Hendresson (BRA)	2	0	2	0	0

Round 1–3
Adil Hendresson (BRA)	0–8	Cheney Haight (USA)
Carlos Espinoza (PER)	9–0	Adil Hendresson (BRA)
Cheney Haight (USA)	3–1	Carlos Espinoza (PER)

==== 87 kg ====
April 19

Round of 16
Ronisson Brandão (BRA)	9
Nicolás Báez (ARG)	0
Lesyan Cousin (JAM)	1
Patrick Martinez (USA)	6
Carlos Adames (DOM)	9
Jovan Mercado (PUR)	0
Alvis Almendra (PAN)	0
Antonio Durán (CUB)	9
Carlos Muñoz (COL)	8
Ricardo Cárdenas (PER)	0
Gregory Reasco (ECU)	0
Alfonso Leyva (MEX)	9

Quarterfinals
Phillip Barreiro (CAN)	0
Luis Avendaño (VEN)	8
Ronisson Brandão (BRA)	0
Patrick Martinez (USA)	7
Carlos Adames (DOM)	6
Antonio Durán (CUB)	14
Carlos Muñoz (COL)	3
Alfonso Leyva (MEX)	3

Semifinals
Luis Avendaño (VEN)	4
Patrick Martinez (USA)	0
Antonio Durán (CUB)	8
Alfonso Leyva (MEX)	0

Final
Luis Avendaño (VEN)	8^{C}
Antonio Durán (CUB)	2

Repechage round 1
Alvis Almendra (PAN)	2
Carlos Adames (DOM)	8

Bronze medal match
Phillip Barreiro (CAN)	0
Patrick Martinez (USA)	9
Carlos Adames (DOM)	0
Alfonso Leyva (MEX)	8

==== 97 kg ====
April 18

Round of 16
Álvaro Gutiérrez (CHI)	0
Thomas Barreiro (CAN)	3
Kevin Mejía (HON)	8
Alejandro Rodríguez (ARG)	0
Manuel Huamán (PER)	0
G'Angelo Hancock (USA)	8

Quarterfinals
Gabriel Rosillo (CUB)	8
Óscar Loango (COL)	0
Edson Acuña (MEX)	0
Luillys Pérez (VEN)	8
José Antonio Arias (DOM)	9
Thomas Barreiro (CAN)	0
Kevin Mejía (HON)	0
G'Angelo Hancock (USA)	9

Semifinals
Gabriel Rosillo (CUB)	8
Luillys Pérez (VEN)	0
José Antonio Arias (DOM)	2
G'Angelo Hancock (USA)	11

Final
Gabriel Rosillo (CUB)	10
G'Angelo Hancock (USA)	2

Repechage round 1
Manuel Huamán (PER)	1
Kevin Mejía (HON)	10

Bronze medal match
Óscar Loango (COL)	1
Luillys Pérez (VEN)	3
Kevin Mejía (HON)	13
José Antonio Arias (DOM)	4

==== 130 kg ====
April 18

Round of 16
Daniel Medina (PER)	1
Diego Almendras (CHI)	1
Moisés Pérez (VEN)	3
Eduard Soghomonyan (BRA)	3
Ángel Pacheco (CUB)	9
José Erazo (ESA)	0

Quarterfinals
Luis Román (MEX)	0
Edgardo López (PUR)	8
Luciano del Río (ARG)	9
Charles Thoms (CAN)	0
Adam Coon (USA)	10^{F}
Diego Almendras (CHI)	0
Moisés Pérez (VEN)	2
Ángel Pacheco (CUB)	5

Semifinals
Edgardo López (PUR)	1
Luciano del Río (ARG)	4
Adam Coon (USA)	10^{F}
Ángel Pacheco (CUB)	2

Final
Luciano del Río (ARG)	1
Adam Coon (USA)	2^{F}

Bronze medal match
Charles Thoms (CAN)	7
Edgardo López (PUR)	11
Diego Almendras (CHI)	0
Ángel Pacheco (CUB)	8

=== Women's freestyle ===
==== 50 kg ====
April 20

Round of 16
Thalía Mallqui (PER)	10
Jodalys Santiago (PUR)	0
Dannia Figueroa (COL)	8
Kamila Barbosa (BRA)	2
Jacqueline Mollocana (ECU)	11
Anny Ramírez (DOM)	0
Erin Golston (USA)	4
Jessica MacDonald (CAN)	0^{R}

Quarterfinals
Patricia Bermúdez (ARG)	2
Yusneylys Guzmán (CUB)	12
Eliana Toledo (VEN)	0
Mariana Díaz Muñoz (MEX)	10
Thalía Mallqui (PER)	6
Dannia Figueroa (COL)	3
Jacqueline Mollocana (ECU)	3
Erin Golston (USA)	4

Semifinals
Yusneylys Guzmán (CUB)	10
Mariana Díaz Muñoz (MEX)	0
Thalía Mallqui (PER)	0
Erin Golston (USA)	10

Final
Yusneylys Guzmán (CUB)	3
Erin Golston (USA)	0

Repechage round 1
Jessica MacDonald (CAN)
Jacqueline Mollocana (ECU)	WO

Bronze medal match
Patricia Bermúdez (ARG)	6^{F}
Mariana Díaz Muñoz (MEX)	2
Jacqueline Mollocana (ECU)	7
Thalía Mallqui (PER)	10

==== 53 kg ====
April 20

Round of 16
Carolina Castillo (COL)	WO
Betzabeth Argüello (VEN)
Gracyenne Helena (BRA)	11^{F}
Carolina Ochoa (ESA)	0
Karla Acosta (MEX)	10
Diana Weicker (CAN)	10^{F}

Quarterfinals
Luisa Valverde (ECU)	4^{F}
Justina Benites (PER)	0
Lilianet Duanes (CUB)	10
Evelin Sosa (ARG)	0
Sarah Hildebrandt (USA)	7
Carolina Castillo (COL)	0
Gracyenne Helena (BRA)	0
Diana Weicker (CAN)	11

Semifinals
Luisa Valverde (ECU)	10^{F}
Lilianet Duanes (CUB)	8
Sarah Hildebrandt (USA)	10
Diana Weicker (CAN)	2

Final
Luisa Valverde (ECU)	0
Sarah Hildebrandt (USA)	11

Bronze medal match
Justina Benites (PER)	0
Lilianet Duanes (CUB)	10
Carolina Castillo (COL)	2
Diana Weicker (CAN)	6

==== 55 kg ====
April 19

Pos	Athlete	Pld	W	L	CP	TP
1	Alexandra Hedrick (USA)	2	2	0	8	14
2	Jayd Davis (CAN)	2	1	1	5	18
3	Nerina Azerrad (ARG)	2	0	2	1	4

Round 1–3
Alexandra Hedrick (USA)	8–0 Fall	Nerina Azerrad (ARG)
Jayd Davis (CAN)	4–6	Alexandra Hedrick (USA)
Nerina Azerrad (ARG)	4–14	Jayd Davis (CAN)

==== 57 kg ====
April 20

Round of 16
Giullia Penalber (BRA)	4^{F}
Josellinne Orellana (GUA)	0
Jacarra Winchester (USA)	9
Lianna Montero (CUB)	5
Martha Olivares (PER)	0
Lissette Antes (ECU)	11

Quarterfinals
Andrea Garnica (MEX)	0
Nes Marie Rodríguez (PUR)	10
Betzabeth Sarco (VEN)	8
Hannah Taylor (CAN)	11
Yessica Oviedo (DOM)	8^{F}
Giullia Penalber (BRA)	0
Jacarra Winchester (USA)	0
Lissette Antes (ECU)	9

Semifinals
Nes Marie Rodríguez (PUR)	2
Hannah Taylor (CAN)	5^{F}
Yessica Oviedo (DOM)	2
Lissette Antes (ECU)	6^{F}

Final
Hannah Taylor (CAN)	3
Lissette Antes (ECU)	3^{F}

Repechage round 1
Martha Olivares (PER)	0
Jacarra Winchester (USA)	10

Bronze medal match
Betzabeth Sarco (VEN)	5
Nes Marie Rodríguez (PUR)	4
Jacarra Winchester (USA)	7^{F}
Yessica Oviedo (DOM)	4

==== 59 kg ====
April 19

Pos	Athlete	Pld	W	L	CP	TP
1	Laurence Beauregard (CAN)	3	3	0	12	16
2	Andribeth Rivera (PUR)	3	2	1	10	12
3	Karoline Santana (BRA)	3	1	2	5	0
4	Kelsey Campbell (USA)	3	0	3	0	0

Round 1–3
Andribeth Rivera (PUR)	10–0	Karoline Santana (BRA)
Laurence Beauregard (CAN)	Walkover	Kelsey Campbell (USA)
Andribeth Rivera (PUR)	2–6	Laurence Beauregard (CAN)
Karoline Santana (BRA)	Walkover	Kelsey Campbell (USA)
Andribeth Rivera (PUR)	Walkover	Kelsey Campbell (USA)
Karoline Santana (BRA)	0–10	Laurence Beauregard (CAN)

==== 62 kg ====
April 20

Round of 16
Yaquelin Estornell (CUB)	8
Braxton Stone-Papadopoulos (CAN)	1
Nathaly Grimán (VEN)	10
Isidora Díaz (CHI)	0
Laís Nunes (BRA)	10
Andrea González (COL)	0

Quarterfinals
Jannette Mallqui (PER)	0
Mayra Antes (ECU)	6^{F}
Mallory Velte (USA)	10
Abnelis Yambo (PUR)	0
Fátima Crisanto (MEX)	0
Yaquelin Estornell (CUB)	6
Nathaly Grimán (VEN)	4
Laís Nunes (BRA)	5

Semifinals
Mayra Antes (ECU)	0
Mallory Velte (USA)	10
Yaquelin Estornell (CUB)	7
Laís Nunes (BRA)	15

Final
Mallory Velte (USA)	1
Laís Nunes (BRA)	6

Repechage round 1
Andrea González (COL)	2
Nathaly Grimán (VEN)	6^{F}

Bronze medal match
Abnelis Yambo (PUR)	11
Mayra Antes (ECU)	7
Nathaly Grimán (VEN)	2^{F}
Yaquelin Estornell (CUB)	0

==== 65 kg ====
April 19

Pos	Athlete	Pld	W	L	CP	TP
1	Julia Salata (USA)	2	2	0	9	21
2	Jessica Brouillette (CAN)	2	1	1	5	8
3	Gabriela Rocha (BRA)	2	0	2	0	0

Round 1–3
Julia Salata (USA)	11–0	Jessica Brouillette (CAN)
Gabriela Rocha (BRA)	0–10 Fall	Julia Salata (USA)
Jessica Brouillette (CAN)	8–0 Fall	Gabriela Rocha (BRA)

==== 68 kg ====
April 20

Round of 16
Olivia Di Bacco (CAN)	6
Dailane Reis (BRA)	1

Quarterfinals
Tamyra Mensah (USA)	6^{F}
Andrimar Lázaro (VEN)	0
Saidy Chávez (HON)	0
Ámbar Garnica (MEX)	4^{F}
Yudari Sánchez (CUB)	WO
Yanet Sovero (PER)
Leonela Ayoví (ECU)	0
Olivia Di Bacco (CAN)	10

Semifinals
Tamyra Mensah (USA)	8^{F}
Ámbar Garnica (MEX)	0
Yudari Sánchez (CUB)	4
Olivia Di Bacco (CAN)	1

Final
Tamyra Mensah (USA)	4^{F}
Yudari Sánchez (CUB)	0

Bronze medal match
Andrimar Lázaro (VEN)	4
Ámbar Garnica (MEX)	8
Yanet Sovero (PER)
Olivia Di Bacco (CAN)	WO

==== 72 kg ====
April 19

Pos	Athlete	Pld	W	L	CP	TP
1	Dejah Slater (CAN)	2	2	0	7	17
2	Rachel Watters (USA)	2	1	1	5	14
3	Linda Machuca (ARG)	2	0	2	2	7

Round 1–3
Linda Machuca (ARG)	3–13	Rachel Watters (USA)
Dejah Slater (CAN)	5–4	Linda Machuca (ARG)
Rachel Watters (USA)	1–12	Dejah Slater (CAN)

==== 76 kg ====
April 20

Round of 16
Andrea Olaya (COL)	0
Adeline Gray (USA)	10
María Acosta (VEN)	0
Erica Wiebe (CAN)	8^{F}

Quarterfinals
Diana Cruz (PER)	5
Génesis Reasco (ECU)	7
Josselyn Portillo (ESA)	0
Gabriela Canales (MEX)	4
Mabelkis Capote (CUB)	10
Keila Calaça (BRA)	0
Adeline Gray (USA)	10
Erica Wiebe (CAN)	0

Semifinals
Génesis Reasco (ECU)	10
Gabriela Canales (MEX)	0
Mabelkis Capote (CUB)	0
Adeline Gray (USA)	3^{F}

Final
Génesis Reasco (ECU)	0
Adeline Gray (USA)	4^{F}

Repechage round 1
Andrea Olaya (COL)	0
Erica Wiebe (CAN)	10

Bronze medal match
Diana Cruz (PER)	8^{F}
Gabriela Canales (MEX)	3
Erica Wiebe (CAN)	6
Mabelkis Capote (CUB)	0

== See also ==
- Wrestling at the 2019 Pan American Games – Qualification
