= Wrestling at the 2018 South American Games =

- Venue: Coliseo Jose Villazon
- Dates: 5–7 June
- Competitors: 42 from 11 nations

There were 18 Wrestling events at the 2018 South American Games in Cochabamba, Bolivia. 12 for men (six freestyle and six Greco-Roman) and six freestyle events for women. The events were held between June 5 and 7 at the Coliseo Jose Villazon. This event was a qualification event for the 2019 Pan American Games in Lima, Peru, where the top athlete not already qualified in each event, qualified a quota spot for their country.

== Medal summary ==
=== Medal table ===
Rank	Nation	Gold	Silver	Bronze	Total
1	Venezuela (VEN)	6	6	4	16
2	Colombia (COL)	5	4	3	12
3	Brazil (BRA)	3	1	3	7
4	Ecuador (ECU)	2	0	4	6
5	Peru (PER)	1	3	2	6
6	Chile (CHI)	1	0	1	2
7	Argentina (ARG)	0	4	2	6
8	Panama (PAN)	0	0	1	1
Totals (8 entries)		18	18	20	56

=== Medallists ===
Athletes in bold qualified their country a quota spot for the 2019 Pan American Games.

==== Men's freestyle ====
Event	Gold	Silver	Bronze
57 kg	**Pedro Mejías**; **Venezuela**	Óscar Tigreros; Colombia	Samuel Alva; Peru
65 kg	**Anthony Montero**; **Venezuela**	Agustín Destribats; Argentina	Sixto Auccapiña; Peru
74 kg	Hernan Guzman; Colombia	**Jorge Llano**; **Argentina**	Mauricio Sanchez; Ecuador; Kervin Olivares; Venezuela
86 kg	Pedro Ceballos; Venezuela	**Pool Ambrocio**; **Peru**	Eduardo Gajardo; Chile; Meruzhan Nikoyan; Argentina
97 kg	**José Díaz**; **Venezuela**	Richard Baez; Argentina	Victor Saa; Colombia
125 kg	**Luis Vivenes**; **Venezuela**	Catril Muriel; Argentina	Jorge Medina; Ecuador

==== Men's Greco-Roman ====
Event	Gold	Silver	Bronze
60 kg	Andres Montano; Ecuador	**Dicther Toro**; **Colombia**	Anthony Palencia; Venezuela
67 kg	Joílson Júnior; Brazil	**Mario Molina**; **Peru**	Jose Sanchez Betancourt; Ecuador
77 kg	Jair Cuero; Colombia	**Luis Avendaño**; **Venezuela**	Angelo Moreira; Brazil
87 kg	**Carlos Muñoz**; **Colombia**	Yorgen Cova; Venezuela	Alvis Almendra; Panama
97 kg	Luillys Perez; Venezuela	**Oscar Solis**; **Colombia**	Davi Albino; Brazil
130 kg	Yasmani Acosta; Chile	**Erwin Caraballo**; **Venezuela**	Luciano del Rio; Argentina

==== Women's freestyle ====
Event	Gold	Silver	Bronze
50 kg	Carolina Castillo; Colombia	**Thalía Mallqui**; **Peru**	Jacqueline Mollocana; Ecuador
53 kg	Luisa Valverde; Ecuador	Betzabeth Argüello; Venezuela	**Dannia Figueroa**; **Colombia**
57 kg	**Giullia Penalber**; **Brazil**	Eva González; Colombia	Betzabeth Sarco; Venezuela
62 kg	Laís Nunes; Brazil	**Nathaly Grimán**; **Venezuela**	Jackeline Rentería; Colombia
68 kg	**Yanet Sovero**; **Peru**	Soleymi Caraballo; Venezuela	Dailane Reis; Brazil
76 kg	Andrea Olaya; Colombia	**Aline Ferreira**; **Brazil**	María Acosta; Venezuela

== See also ==
- Wrestling at the 2019 Pan American Games – Qualification
