= Wrestling at the 2019 Pan American Games – Men's Greco-Roman 87 kg =

Men's Greco-Roman 87 kg at the 2019 Pan American Games
- Venue: Miguel Grau Coliseum
- Dates: August 7
- Competitors: 9 from 9 nations

Medalists
| Gold medal | Luis Avendaño | Venezuela |
| Silver medal | Alfonso Leyva | Mexico |
| Bronze medal | Alvis Almendra | Panama |
| Bronze medal | Daniel Grégorich | Cuba |

The Men's Greco-Roman 87 kg competition of the Wrestling events at the 2019 Pan American Games in Lima was held on August 7 at the Miguel Grau Coliseum.

== Results ==
All times are local (UTC−5)

Legend

- F — Won by fall

=== Final ===
Qualifications
Joe Rau (USA) | 5
Ricardo Cárdenas (PER) | 3

Quarterfinals
Alvis Almendra (PAN) | 0
Alfonso Leyva (MEX) | 8
Carlos Muñoz (COL) | 9
Phillip Barreiro (CAN) | 0
Carlos Adames (DOM) | 0
Daniel Grégorich (CUB) | 8
Luis Avendaño (VEN) | 8
Joe Rau (USA) | 0

Semifinals
Alfonso Leyva (MEX) | 6
Carlos Muñoz (COL) | 3
Daniel Grégorich (CUB) | 0
Luis Avendaño (VEN) | 4^{F}

Finals
Alfonso Leyva (MEX) | 3
Luis Avendaño (VEN) | 5

=== Repechage ===
Bronze medal match
Alvis Almendra (PAN) | 2
Carlos Muñoz (COL) | 1
Joe Rau (USA) | 2
Daniel Grégorich (CUB) | 8
