= Daniel Grégorich =

Cuban Greco-Roman wrestler

Personal information
- Full name: Daniel Grégorich Hechavarria
- Born: 7 May 1996 (age 30) Arroyo Naranjo, Cuba

Sport
- Country: Cuba
- Sport: Amateur wrestling
- Weight class: 87 kg
- Event: Greco-Roman
Medal record
Men's Greco-Roman wrestling
Representing Cuba
Pan American Games
Gold medal – first place	2023 Santiago	87 kg
Bronze medal – third place	2019 Lima	87 kg
Pan American Championships
Gold medal – first place	2018 Lima	87 kg
Gold medal – first place	2022 Acapulco	87 kg
Gold medal – first place	2023 Buenos Aires	87 kg
Gold medal – first place	2024 Acapulco	87 kg
Silver medal – second place	2017 Salvador da Bahia	85 kg
Silver medal – second place	2026 Coralville	87 kg
Central American and Caribbean Games
Gold medal – first place	2018 Barranquilla	87 kg
Gold medal – first place	2023 San Salvador	87 kg
Gold medal – first place	2026 Santo Domingo	87 kg

Daniel Grégorich Hechavarria (Note: In this Spanish name, the first or paternal surname is Grégorich and the second or maternal family name is Hechavarria.) (born 7 May 1996) is a Cuban Greco-Roman wrestler. He won the gold medal in the 87 kg event at the 2023 Pan American Games held in Santiago, Chile. He has also won gold medals at the Pan American Wrestling Championships and the Central American and Caribbean Games.

== Career ==
Grégorich won the gold medal in the 87 kg event at the 2018 Central American and Caribbean Games held in Barranquilla, Colombia.

At the 2019 Pan American Games held in Lima, Peru, Grégorich won one of the bronze medals in the men's 87 kg event. He defeated Joe Rau of the United States in his bronze medal match.

In the same year, he competed in the 87 kg event at the 2019 World Wrestling Championships held in Nur-Sultan, Kazakhstan without winning a medal. He was eliminated in his fourth match by Rustam Assakalov of Uzbekistan.

Grégorich competed in the men's 87 kg event at the 2020 Summer Olympics in Tokyo, Japan.

Grégorich won the gold medal in his event at the 2024 Pan American Wrestling Championships held in Acapulco, Mexico. He defeated Luis Avendaño of Venezuela in his gold medal match. A few days later, he competed at the 2024 Pan American Wrestling Olympic Qualification Tournament held in Acapulco, Mexico hoping to qualify for the 2024 Summer Olympics in Paris, France. He was eliminated in his second match.

== Achievements ==
Year	Tournament	Location	Result	Event
2018	Central American and Caribbean Games	Barranquilla, Colombia	1st	Greco-Roman 87 kg
2019	Pan American Games	Lima, Peru	3rd	Greco-Roman 87 kg
2022	Pan American Wrestling Championships	Acapulco, Mexico	1st	Greco-Roman 87 kg
2023	Pan American Wrestling Championships	Buenos Aires, Argentina	1st	Greco-Roman 87 kg
2023	Central American and Caribbean Games	San Salvador, El Salvador	1st	Greco-Roman 87 kg
2023	Pan American Games	Santiago, Chile	1st	Greco-Roman 87 kg
2024	Pan American Wrestling Championships	Acapulco, Mexico	1st	Greco-Roman 87 kg
