= Wrestling at the 2019 Pan American Games – Women's freestyle 68 kg =

Women's Freestyle 68 kg at the 2019 Pan American Games
- Venue: Miguel Grau Coliseum
- Dates: August 8
- Competitors: 8 from 8 nations

Medalists
Gold medal	Tamyra Mensah-Stock	United States
Silver medal	Olivia Di Bacco	Canada
Bronze medal	Yudaris Sánchez	Cuba
Bronze medal	Ámbar Garnica	Mexico

The women's freestyle 68 kg competition of the Wrestling events at the 2019 Pan American Games in Lima was held on August 9 at the Miguel Grau Coliseum.

== Results ==
All times are local (UTC−5)

Legend

- F — Won by fall

=== Final ===
Quarterfinals		Semifinals		Finals
Yudaris Sánchez (CUB)	2
Olivia Di Bacco (CAN)	5	Olivia Di Bacco (CAN)	9^{F}
María Acosta (VEN)	8	María Acosta (VEN)	4
Leonela Ayoví (ECU)	0			Olivia Di Bacco (CAN)	0
Ámbar Garnica (MEX)	2^{F}			Tamyra Mensah-Stock (USA)	4^{F}
Saidy Chávez (HON)	0	Ámbar Garnica (MEX)	0
Tamyra Mensah-Stock (USA)	12	Tamyra Mensah-Stock (USA)	6^{F}
Yanet Sovero (PER)	0

=== Repechage ===
Bronze medal match
Yudaris Sánchez (CUB)	5
María Acosta (VEN)	3
Yanet Sovero (PER)	5
Ámbar Garnica (MEX)	8
