= Olivia Di Bacco =

Canadian freestyle wrestler

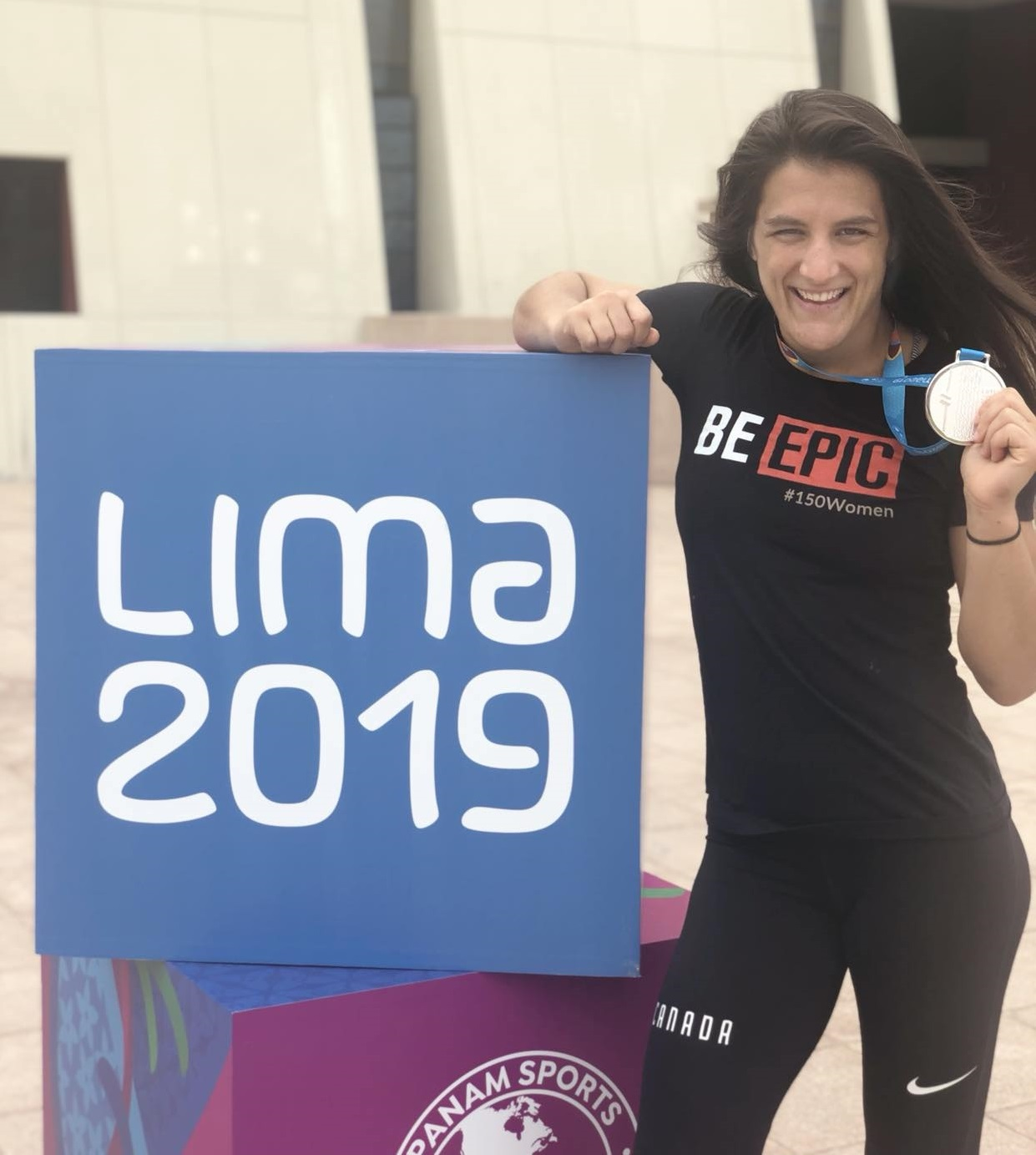
- Olivia Di Bacco with her silver medal from the 2019 Pan American Games

Personal information
- Full name: Olivia Grace Di Bacco
- Born: 4 August 1992 (age 34)
- Height: 168 cm (5 ft 6 in)

Sport
- Country: Canada
- Sport: Amateur wrestling
- Weight class: 68 kg
- Event: Freestyle
- Club: Brock Wrestling Club
Medal record
Women's freestyle wrestling
Representing Canada
Pan American Wrestling Championships
Gold medal – first place	2017 Lauro de Freitas	69 kg
Gold medal – first place	2024 Acapulco	68 kg
Bronze medal – third place	2019 Buenos Aires	68 kg
Bronze medal – third place	2020 Ottawa	68 kg
Pan American Games
Silver medal – second place	2019 Lima	68 kg
Bronze medal – third place	2023 Santiago	68 kg

Olivia Grace Di Bacco (born 4 August 1992) is a Canadian freestyle wrestler. She is a four-time medalist, including two gold medals, at the Pan American Wrestling Championships. At the 2019 Pan American Games held in Lima, Peru, she won the silver medal in the 68 kg event.

== Career ==
At the Pan American Wrestling Championships, she won the gold medal in 2017 and 2024. She won one of the bronze medals both in 2019 and 2020.

In March 2021, she won one of the bronze medals in the 68 kg event at the Matteo Pellicone Ranking Series 2021 held in Rome, Italy. In October 2021, she lost her bronze medal match in the 68 kg event at the 2021 World Wrestling Championships held in Oslo, Norway.

In 2023, Di Bacco competed in her event at the Pan American Wrestling Championships held in Buenos Aires, Argentina. In September 2023, she competed in the women's 68 kg event at the 2023 World Wrestling Championships held in Belgrade, Serbia. She won one of the bronze medals in the women's 68 kg event at the 2023 Pan American Games held in Santiago, Chile. She defeated Ámbar Garnica of Mexico in her bronze medal match.

Di Bacco won the gold medal in her event at the 2024 Pan American Wrestling Championships held in Acapulco, Mexico. She defeated Soleymi Caraballo of Venezuela in her gold medal match.

== Achievements ==
Year	Tournament	Location	Result	Event
2017	Pan American Wrestling Championships	Lauro de Freitas, Brazil	1st	Freestyle 69 kg
2019	Pan American Wrestling Championships	Buenos Aires, Argentina	3rd	Freestyle 68 kg
2019	Pan American Games	Lima, Peru	2nd	Freestyle 68 kg
2020	Pan American Wrestling Championships	Ottawa, Canada	3rd	Freestyle 68 kg
2023	Pan American Games	Santiago, Chile	3rd	Freestyle 68 kg
2024	Pan American Wrestling Championships	Acapulco, Mexico	1st	Freestyle 68 kg
