= Wrestling at the 2015 Pan American Games – Men's Greco-Roman 75 kg =

Men's Greco-Roman 75 kg at the 2015 Pan American Games
- Venue: Mississauga Sports Centre
- Dates: July 15
- Competitors: 8 from 8 nations

Medalists
Gold medal	Andy Bisek	United States
Silver medal	Alvis Almendra	Panama
Bronze medal	Juan Escobar	Mexico
Bronze medal	Carlos Muñoz	Colombia

The Men's Greco-Roman 75 kg competition of the Wrestling events at the 2015 Pan American Games in Toronto were held on July 15 at the Mississauga Sports Centre.

== Schedule ==
All times are Eastern Daylight Time (UTC-4).

Date	Time	Round
July 15, 2015	14:35	Quarterfinals
July 15, 2015	15:38	Semifinals
July 15, 2015	20:59	Bronze medal matches
July 15, 2015	21:17	Final

== Results ==
Legend

- F — Won by fall

Cuban wrestler Julio Bastida was entered into the competition but did not compete and was not a part of the draw.

=== Final ===
Quarterfinals		Semifinals		Finals
Maximiliano Prudenzano (ARG)	0
Alvis Almendra (PAN)	9	Alvis Almendra (PAN)	2
Asnage Castelly (HAI)	2	Carlos Muñoz (COL)	2
Carlos Muñoz (COL)	10			Alvis Almendra (PAN)	0
Juan Escobar (MEX)	8			Andy Bisek (USA)	8
Luigi Garcia (PER)	0	Juan Escobar (MEX)	0
Andy Bisek (USA)	8	Andy Bisek (USA)	9
Luis Avendaño (VEN)	0

=== Repechage ===
Bronze medal match
Maximiliano Prudenzano (ARG)	3
Carlos Muñoz (COL)	4
Luis Avendaño (VEN)	0
Juan Escobar (MEX)	2^{F}
