= Wrestling at the 2023 Pan American Games – Men's freestyle 74 kg =

Men's Freestyle 74 kg at the 2023 Pan American Games
- Venue: Olympic Training Center in Ñuñoa
- Dates: November 1
- Competitors: 9 from 9 nations

Medalists
Gold medal	Tyler Berger	United States
Silver medal	Franklin Marén	Cuba
Bronze medal	Adam Thomson	Canada
Bronze medal	Anthony Montero	Venezuela

The men's freestyle 74 kg competition of the Wrestling events at the 2023 Pan American Games in Ñuñoa was held on November 1.

== Qualification ==
The winner of each weight category at the 2021 Junior Pan American Games in Cali, Colombia qualified directly, along with the top four at the 2022 Pan American Wrestling Championships and 2023 Pan American Wrestling Championships. The host country (Chile) is guaranteed a spot in each event, but its athletes must compete in both the 2022 and 2023 Pan American Championship. If Chile does not qualify at any of the first two events, it will take the fourth spot available at the 2023 Pan American Championships. A further six wildcards (four men and two women) will be awarded to nations without any qualified athlete but took part in the qualification tournaments.

== Schedule ==
All times are local (UTC−3)

Date	Time	Event
Wednesday, 1 November 2023	10:00	Round of 16
Wednesday, 1 November 2023	10:00	Quarterfinals
Wednesday, 1 November 2023	11:00	Semifinals
Wednesday, 1 November 2023	17:00	Finals

== Results ==
Legend

- F — Won by fall

=== Main Bracket ===
Round of 16
Luis Barrios (HON)	11
León Peralta (CHI)	0

Quarterfinals
Shane Jones (PUR)	5
Luis Barrios (HON)	11
Franklin Marén (CUB)	4
Adam Thomson (CAN)	4
Anthony Montero (VEN)	2
Tyler Berger (USA)	5
César Alvan (BRA)	4
Anthony Valencia (MEX)	14^{F}

Semifinals
Luis Barrios (HON)	1
Franklin Marén (CUB)	6
Tyler Berger (USA)	17
Anthony Valencia (MEX)	3

Finals
Franklin Marén (CUB)	0
Tyler Berger (USA)	3

=== Repechage ===
Bronze medal match
Adam Thomson (CAN)	6
Luis Barrios (HON)	5
Anthony Montero (VEN)	7
Anthony Valencia (MEX)	2

== Final standing ==
Rank	Athlete
1st place, gold medalist(s)	Tyler Berger (USA)
2nd place, silver medalist(s)	Franklin Marén (CUB)
3rd place, bronze medalist(s)	Adam Thomson (CAN)
3rd place, bronze medalist(s)	Anthony Montero (VEN)
5	Luis Barrios (HON)
5	Anthony Valencia (MEX)
7	César Alvan (BRA)
8	Shane Jones (PUR)
9	León Peralta (CHI)
