= Yudari Sánchez =

Cuban freestyle wrestler (born 1997)

Personal information
- Full name: Yudari Sánchez Rodríguez
- Born: 15 November 1997 (age 28)
- Height: 167 cm (5 ft 6 in)

Sport
- Country: Cuba
- Sport: Amateur wrestling
- Weight class: 68 kg
- Event: Freestyle
Medal record
Women's freestyle wrestling
Representing Cuba
Pan American Championships
Gold medal – first place	2018 Lima	68 kg
Silver medal – second place	2019 Buenos Aires	68 kg
Silver medal – second place	2020 Ottawa	68 kg
Pan American Games
Bronze medal – third place	2019 Lima	68 kg
Central American and Caribbean Games
Gold medal – first place	2018 Barranquilla	68 kg
Golden Grand Prix Ivan Yarygin
Bronze medal – third place	2018 Krasnoyarsk	68 kg
World U23 Championships
Bronze medal – third place	2017 Bydgoszcz	69 kg

Yudari Sánchez Rodríguez (Note: In this Spanish name, the first or paternal surname is Sánchez and the second or maternal family name is Rodríguez.) (born 15 November 1997) is a Cuban freestyle wrestler. She won the gold medal in her event at the 2018 Pan American Wrestling Championships held in Lima, Peru. In March 2020, she qualified at the 2020 Pan American Wrestling Olympic Qualification Tournament held in Ottawa, Canada to represent Cuba at the 2020 Summer Olympics in Tokyo, Japan.

== Career ==
In 2016, Sánchez competed in the Pan American Olympic Qualification Tournament without successfully qualifying for the 2016 Summer Olympics in Rio de Janeiro, Brazil. She lost her first match against Dorothy Yeats of Canada which meant that she could no longer become one of the top two wrestlers in her event and qualify for the Olympics.

Sánchez won the gold medal in the 68 kg event at the 2018 Central American and Caribbean Games held in Barranquilla, Colombia. Later that year, she competed at the 2018 World Wrestling Championships in the 68 kg event without winning a medal. A month later, she won the gold medal at the 2018 World U23 Wrestling Championship held in Bucharest, Romania. In 2019, she won the silver medal in the 68 kg event at the Pan American Wrestling Championships in Buenos Aires, Argentina and later that year she won one of the bronze medals in the 68 kg event at the 2019 Pan American Games in Lima, Peru.

In 2020, Sánchez repeated her win of the silver medal at the Pan American Wrestling Championships in Ottawa, Canada. In 2021, she competed in the women's 68 kg event at the 2020 Summer Olympics held in Tokyo, Japan where she was eliminated in her first match.

== Achievements ==
Year	Tournament	Location	Result	Event
2018	Pan American Wrestling Championships	Lima, Peru	1st	Freestyle 68 kg
2018	Central American and Caribbean Games	Barranquilla, Colombia	1st	Freestyle 68 kg
2019	Pan American Wrestling Championships	Buenos Aires, Argentina	2nd	Freestyle 68 kg
2019	Pan American Games	Lima, Peru	3rd	Freestyle 68 kg
2020	Pan American Wrestling Championships	Ottawa, Canada	2nd	Freestyle 68 kg
