= Jessica Brouillette =

Canadian freestyle wrestler (born 1995)

Personal information
- Full name: Jessica Lise Brouillette
- Born: 12 June 1995 (age 31)

Sport
- Country: Canada
- Sport: Amateur wrestling
- Event: Freestyle
- Club: Brock Wrestling Club
Medal record
Women's freestyle wrestling
Representing Canada
Pan American Championships
Silver medal – second place	2019 Buenos Aires	65 kg
Bronze medal – third place	2020 Ottawa	62 kg
Jeux de la Francophonie
Gold medal – first place	2017 Abidjan	63 kg

Jessica Lise Brouillette (born 12 June 1995) is a Canadian freestyle wrestler. At the 2019 Pan American Wrestling Championships held in Buenos Aires, Argentina, she won the silver medal in the women's 65 kg event. In 2020, she won the bronze medal in the 62 kg event at the Pan American Wrestling Championships held in Ottawa, Canada.

In 2016, Brouillette won one of the bronze medals in the women's 63 kg event at the World University Wrestling Championships held in Çorum, Turkey.

== Achievements ==
Year	Tournament	Location	Result	Event
2017	Jeux de la Francophonie	Abidjan, Ivory Coast	1st	Freestyle 63 kg
2019	Pan American Wrestling Championships	Buenos Aires, Argentina	2nd	Freestyle 65 kg
2020	Pan American Wrestling Championships	Ottawa, Canada	3rd	Freestyle 62 kg
