= Wrestling at the 2019 Pan American Games – Qualification =

The following is the qualification system for the Wrestling at the 2019 Pan American Games event, along with a list of qualified wrestlers per weight category.

== Qualification system ==
A total of 150 wrestlers will qualify to compete at the games. The winner of each weight category at the 2018 South American Games and 2018 Central American and Caribbean Games and the top three at the 2018 Pan American Championships will qualify for the Games. The top three at the 2019 Pan American Championships also qualify. The host country (Peru) is guaranteed a spot in each event, but its athletes must compete in both the 2018 and 2019 Pan American Championship. If Peru has not qualified at the end of the 2019 Pan American Championships, the third spot available at the tournament will be awarded to Peru. A further six wildcards (four men and two women) will be awarded to nations without any qualified athlete but took part in the qualification tournaments.

== Qualification timeline ==
Events	Date	Venue
2018 Pan American Wrestling Championships	May 3–6	(Peru) Lima
2018 South American Games	June 5–7	(Bolivia) Cochabamba
2018 Central American and Caribbean Games	July 29 – August 2	(Colombia) Barranquilla
2019 Pan American Wrestling Championships	April 18–21	(Argentina) Buenos Aires

== Qualification summary ==
A total of 15 countries qualified wrestlers, with a further six receiving wild cards.

NOC	Men's freestyle						Men's Greco-Roman						Women's freestyle						Total
NOC	57 kg	65 kg	74 kg	86 kg	97 kg	125 kg	60 kg	67 kg	77 kg	87 kg	97 kg	130 kg	50 kg	53 kg	57 kg	62 kg	68 kg	76 kg	Total
Argentina		X	X	X								X	X						5
Brazil	X					X		X	X				X	X	X	X		X	9
Canada	X		X	X	X	X				X	X			X	X		X	X	11
Chile												X							1
Colombia	X		X	X			X		X	X	X		X	X		X		X	11
Costa Rica					X														1
Cuba	X	X	X	X	X	X	X	X	X	X	X	X	X	X	X	X	X	X	18
Dominican Republic	X	X	X		X		X	X		X	X	X							9
Ecuador		X				X	X	X					X	X	X	X	X	X	10
El Salvador																		X	1
Guatemala									X										1
Honduras											X						X		2
Jamaica				X															1
Mexico		X		X			X	X	X	X			X		X		X		9
Nicaragua															X				1
Panama										X									1
Paraguay				X															1
Peru	X	X	X	X	X	X	X	X	X	X	X	X	X	X	X	X	X	X	18
Puerto Rico			X		X	X			X			X			X	X			7
United States	X	X	X	X	X	X	X	X	X	X	X	X	X	X	X	X	X	X	18
Venezuela	X	X		X	X	X	X	X	X	X	X	X		X		X	X	X	15
Total: 21 NOCs	8	8	8	10	8	8	8	8	9	9	8	8	8	8	9	8	8	9	150

== Men's freestyle events ==
=== 57 kg ===
Competition	Vacancies	Qualified
2018 Pan American Championship	3	Cuba; Colombia; United States
2018 South American Games	1	Venezuela
2018 Central American and Caribbean Games	1	Dominican Republic
2019 Pan American Championship	2	Canada; Brazil
Host nation	1	Peru
Total	8	

=== 65 kg ===
Competition	Vacancies	Qualified
2018 Pan American Championship	3	United States; Peru; Dominican Republic
2018 South American Games	1	Venezuela
2018 Central American and Caribbean Games	1	Cuba
2019 Pan American Championship	3	Argentina; Ecuador; Mexico
Total	8	

=== 74 kg ===
Competition	Vacancies	Qualified
2018 Pan American Championship	3	Cuba; United States; Colombia
2018 South American Games	1	Argentina
2018 Central American and Caribbean Games	1	Puerto Rico
2019 Pan American Championship	2	Canada; Dominican Republic
Host nation	1	Peru
Total	8	

=== 86 kg ===
Competition	Vacancies	Qualified
2018 Pan American Championship	3	United States; Cuba; Venezuela
2018 South American Games	1	Peru
2018 Central American and Caribbean Games	1	Colombia
2019 Pan American Championship	3	Canada; Mexico; Argentina
Wildcard	2	Jamaica; Paraguay
Total	10	

=== 97 kg ===
Competition	Vacancies	Qualified
2018 Pan American Championship	3	Cuba; United States; Canada
2018 South American Games	1	Venezuela
2018 Central American and Caribbean Games	1	Puerto Rico
2019 Pan American Championship	2	Costa Rica; Dominican Republic
Host nation	1	Peru
Total	8	

=== 125 kg ===
Competition	Vacancies	Qualified
2018 Pan American Championship	3	United States; Cuba; Canada
2018 South American Games	1	Venezuela
2018 Central American and Caribbean Games	1	Puerto Rico
2019 Pan American Championship	2	Brazil; Ecuador
Host nation	1	Peru
Total	8	

== Men's Greco-Roman events ==
=== 60 kg ===
Competition	Vacancies	Qualified
2018 Pan American Championship	3	Cuba; Dominican Republic; Ecuador
2018 South American Games	1	Colombia
2018 Central American and Caribbean Games	1	Mexico
2019 Pan American Championship	2	Venezuela; United States
Host nation	1	Peru
Total	8	

=== 67 kg ===
Competition	Vacancies	Qualified
2018 Pan American Championship	3	Cuba; Mexico; Brazil
2018 South American Games	1	Peru
2018 Central American and Caribbean Games	1	Dominican Republic
2019 Pan American Championship	3	United States; Venezuela; Ecuador
Total	8	

=== 77 kg ===
Competition	Vacancies	Qualified
2018 Pan American Championship	3	Cuba; Colombia; Brazil
2018 South American Games	1	Venezuela
2018 Central American and Caribbean Games	1	Puerto Rico
2019 Pan American Championship	2	United States; Mexico
Host nation	1	Peru
Wildcard	1	Guatemala
Total	9	

=== 87 kg ===
Competition	Vacancies	Qualified
2018 Pan American Championship	3	Cuba; Venezuela; Dominican Republic
2018 South American Games	1	Colombia
2018 Central American and Caribbean Games	1	Mexico
2019 Pan American Championship	2	United States; Canada
Host nation	1	Peru
Wildcard	1	Panama
Total	9	

=== 97 kg ===
Competition	Vacancies	Qualified
2018 Pan American Championship	3	Venezuela; Honduras; Cuba
2018 South American Games	1	Colombia
2018 Central American and Caribbean Games	1	Dominican Republic
2019 Pan American Championship	3	United States; Canada; Peru
Total	8	

=== 130 kg ===
Competition	Vacancies	Qualified
2018 Pan American Championship	3	Cuba; United States; Chile
2018 South American Games	1	Venezuela
2018 Central American and Caribbean Games	1	Dominican Republic
2019 Pan American Championship	2	Argentina; Puerto Rico
Host nation	1	Peru
Total	8	

== Women's freestyle events ==
=== 50 kg ===
Competition	Vacancies	Qualified
2018 Pan American Championship	3	United States; Colombia; Mexico
2018 South American Games	1	Peru
2018 Central American and Caribbean Games	1	Cuba
2019 Pan American Championship	3	Argentina; Ecuador; Brazil
Total	8	

=== 53 kg ===
Competition	Vacancies	Qualified
2018 Pan American Championship	3	United States; Ecuador; Venezuela
2018 South American Games	1	Colombia
2018 Central American and Caribbean Games	1	Cuba
2019 Pan American Championship	3	Canada; Peru; Brazil
Total	8	

=== 57 kg ===
Competition	Vacancies	Qualified
2018 Pan American Championship	3	Mexico; Cuba; Canada
2018 South American Games	1	Brazil
2018 Central American and Caribbean Games	1	Puerto Rico
2019 Pan American Championship	2	Ecuador; United States
Host nation	1	Peru
Wildcard	1	Nicaragua
Total	9	

=== 62 kg ===
Competition	Vacancies	Qualified
2018 Pan American Championship	3	Cuba; Brazil; United States
2018 South American Games	1	Venezuela
2018 Central American and Caribbean Games	1	Colombia
2019 Pan American Championship	2	Puerto Rico; Ecuador
Host nation	1	Peru
Total	8	

=== 68 kg ===
Competition	Vacancies	Qualified
2018 Pan American Championship	3	Cuba; Venezuela; Ecuador
2018 South American Games	1	Peru
2018 Central American and Caribbean Games	1	Honduras
2019 Pan American Championship	3	United States; Canada; Mexico
Total	8	

=== 76 kg ===
Competition	Vacancies	Qualified
2018 Pan American Championship	3	United States; Colombia; Cuba
2018 South American Games	1	Brazil
2018 Central American and Caribbean Games	1	Venezuela
2019 Pan American Championship	3	Ecuador; Canada; Peru
Wildcard	1	El Salvador
Total	9	
