= Wrestling at the 2023 Pan American Games – Men's Greco-Roman 87 kg =

Men's Greco-Roman 87 at the 2023 Pan American Games
- Venue: Olympic Training Center in Ñuñoa
- Dates: November 4
- Competitors: 9 from 9 nations

Medalists
Gold medal	Daniel Grégorich	Cuba
Silver medal	Luis Avendaño	Venezuela
Bronze medal	Carlos Muñoz	Colombia
Bronze medal	José Moreno	Chile

The men's Greco-Roman 87 kg competition of the Wrestling events at the 2023 Pan American Games in Ñuñoa was held on November 4.

== Qualification ==
The winner of each weight category at the 2021 Junior Pan American Games in Cali, Colombia qualified directly, along with the top four at the 2022 Pan American Wrestling Championships and 2023 Pan American Wrestling Championships. The host country (Chile) is guaranteed a spot in each event, but its athletes must compete in both the 2022 and 2023 Pan American Championship. If Chile does not qualify at any of the first two events, it will take the fourth spot available at the 2023 Pan American Championships. A further six wildcards (four men and two women) will be awarded to nations without any qualified athlete but took part in the qualification tournaments.

== Schedule ==
All times are local (UTC−3)

Date	Time	Event
Wednesday, 4 November 2023	10:00	Round of 16
Wednesday, 4 November 2023	11:00	Quarterfinals
Wednesday, 4 November 2023	12:00	Semifinals
Wednesday, 4 November 2023	17:00	Finals

== Results ==
Legend

- F — Won by fall

=== Main Bracket ===
Round of 16
Zac Braunagel (USA)	9
Ronisson Brandão (BRA)	0

Quarterfinals
Carlos Muñoz (COL)	11
Zac Braunagel (USA)	0
Ariel Alfonso (HON)	0
Luis Avendaño (VEN)	9
José Moreno (CHI)	0
Daniel Grégorich (CUB)	9
Daniel Vicente (MEX)	0
Johan Batista (DOM)	2

Semifinals
Carlos Muñoz (COL)	4
Luis Avendaño (VEN)	6
Daniel Grégorich (CUB)	8
Johan Batista (DOM)	0

Finals
Luis Avendaño (VEN)	1
Daniel Grégorich (CUB)	5

=== Repechage ===
Bronze medal match
Ariel Alfonso (HON)	3
Carlos Muñoz (COL)	5
José Moreno (CHI)	2
Johan Batista (DOM)	1

== Final standing ==
Rank	Athlete
1st place, gold medalist(s)	Daniel Grégorich (CUB)
2nd place, silver medalist(s)	Luis Avendaño (VEN)
3rd place, bronze medalist(s)	Carlos Muñoz (COL)
3rd place, bronze medalist(s)	José Moreno (CHI)
5	Ariel Alfonso (HON)
5	Johan Batista (DOM)
7	Zac Braunagel (USA)
8	Daniel Vicente (MEX)
9	Ronisson Brandão (BRA)
