= Abnelis Yambo =

Puerto Rican freestyle wrestler

Personal information
- Full name: Abnelis Yambo Miranda
- Born: 10 October 2000 (age 25)

Sport
- Country: Puerto Rico
- Sport: Amateur wrestling
- Weight class: 62 kg
- Event: Freestyle
Medal record
Women's freestyle wrestling
Representing Puerto Rico
Pan American Games
Bronze medal – third place	2019 Lima	62 kg
Pan American Championships
Bronze medal – third place	2019 Buenos Aires	62 kg

Abnelis Yambo Miranda (Note: In this Spanish name, the first or paternal surname is Yambo and the second or maternal family name is Miranda.) (born 10 October 2000) is a Puerto Rican freestyle wrestler. At the 2019 Pan American Games held in Lima, Peru, she won one of the bronze medals in the 62 kg event.

In 2019, she also won one of the bronze medals in the 62 kg event at the Pan American Wrestling Championships held in Buenos Aires, Argentina.

== Achievements ==
Year	Tournament	Location	Result	Event
2019	Pan American Wrestling Championships	Buenos Aires, Argentina	3rd	Freestyle 62 kg
2019	Pan American Games	Lima, Peru	3rd	Freestyle 62 kg
