= Wrestling at the 2023 Pan American Games – Women's freestyle 62 kg =

Women's freestyle 62 at the 2023 Pan American Games
- Venue: Olympic Training Center in Ñuñoa
- Dates: November 3
- Competitors: 8 from 8 nations

Medalists
Gold medal	Laís Nunes	Brazil
Silver medal	María Santana	Cuba
Bronze medal	Kayla Miracle	United States
Bronze medal	Katherine Rentería	Colombia

The women's freestyle 62 kg competition of the Wrestling events at the 2023 Pan American Games in Ñuñoa was held on November 3.

== Qualification ==
The winner of each weight category at the 2021 Junior Pan American Games in Cali, Colombia qualified directly, along with the top four at the 2022 Pan American Wrestling Championships and 2023 Pan American Wrestling Championships. The host country (Chile) is guaranteed a spot in each event, but its athletes must compete in both the 2022 and 2023 Pan American Championship. If Chile does not qualify at any of the first two events, it will take the fourth spot available at the 2023 Pan American Championships. A further six wildcards (four men and two women) will be awarded to nations without any qualified athlete but took part in the qualification tournaments.

== Schedule ==
All times are local (UTC−3)

Date	Time	Event
Wednesday, 3 November 2023
Wednesday, 3 November 2023	10:00	Quarterfinals
Wednesday, 3 November 2023	11:00	Semifinals
Wednesday, 3 November 2023	17:00	Finals

== Results ==
Legend

- F — Won by fall

=== Final ===
Quarterfinals		Semifinals		Finals
Laís Nunes (BRA)	5
Nathaly Grimán (VEN)	1	Laís Nunes (BRA)	6
Leonela Ayoví (ECU)	4	Kayla Miracle (USA)	2
Kayla Miracle (USA)	6^{F}			Laís Nunes (BRA)	3^{F}
María Santana (CUB)	10			María Santana (CUB)	0
Javiera Roco (CHI)	0	María Santana (CUB)	6
Katherine Rentería (COL)	4	Katherine Rentería (COL)	0
Alexis Gómez (MEX)	1

=== Repechage ===
Bronze medal match
Nathaly Grimán (VEN)	3
Kayla Miracle (USA)	10
Javiera Roco (CHI)	0
Katherine Rentería (COL)	10

== Final standing ==
Rank	Athlete
1st place, gold medalist(s)	Laís Nunes (BRA)
2nd place, silver medalist(s)	María Santana (CUB)
3rd place, bronze medalist(s)	Kayla Miracle (USA)
3rd place, bronze medalist(s)	Katherine Rentería (COL)
5	Nathaly Grimán (VEN)
5	Javiera Roco (CHI)
7	Alexis Gómez (MEX)
8	Leonela Ayoví (ECU)
