= Wrestling at the 2023 Pan American Games – Women's freestyle 68 kg =

Women's freestyle 68 at the 2023 Pan American Games
- Venue: Olympic Training Center in Ñuñoa
- Dates: November 2
- Competitors: 9 from 9 nations

Medalists
Gold medal	Forrest Molinari	United States
Silver medal	Soleymi Caraballo	Venezuela
Bronze medal	Nicoll Parrado	Colombia
Bronze medal	Olivia Di Bacco	Canada

The women's freestyle 68 kg competition of the Wrestling events at the 2023 Pan American Games in Ñuñoa was held on November 2.

== Qualification ==
The winner of each weight category at the 2021 Junior Pan American Games in Cali, Colombia qualified directly, along with the top four at the 2022 Pan American Wrestling Championships and 2023 Pan American Wrestling Championships. The host country (Chile) is guaranteed a spot in each event, but its athletes must compete in both the 2022 and 2023 Pan American Championship. If Chile does not qualify at any of the first two events, it will take the fourth spot available at the 2023 Pan American Championships. A further six wildcards (four men and two women) will be awarded to nations without any qualified athlete but took part in the qualification tournaments.

== Schedule ==
All times are local (UTC−3)

Date	Time	Event
Wednesday, 2 November 2023	10:00	Round of 16
Wednesday, 2 November 2023	11:00	Quarterfinals
Wednesday, 2 November 2023	12:00	Semifinals
Wednesday, 2 November 2023	13:00	Repechage
Wednesday, 2 November 2023	17:00	Finals

== Results ==
Legend

- F — Won by fall

=== Main Bracket ===
Round of 16
Forrest Molinari (USA)	10
Saidy Chávez (HON)	0

Quarterfinals
Virginia Jiménez (CHI)	0
Forrest Molinari (USA)	11
Brenda Sterling (CUB)	4
Nicoll Parrado (COL)	4
Yanet Sovero (PER)	0
Ámbar Garnica (MEX)	10
Soleymi Caraballo (VEN)	6^{F}
Olivia Di Bacco (CAN)	0

Semifinals
Forrest Molinari (USA)	11^{F}
Nicoll Parrado (COL)	0
Ámbar Garnica (MEX)	4
Soleymi Caraballo (VEN)	6

Finals
Forrest Molinari (USA)	3
Soleymi Caraballo (VEN)	2

=== Repechage ===
Repechage round 1
Saidy Chávez (HON)	0
Virginia Jiménez (CHI)	3

Bronze medal match
Virginia Jiménez (CHI)	0
Nicoll Parrado (COL)	6^{F}
Olivia Di Bacco (CAN)	8
Ámbar Garnica (MEX)	6

== Final standing ==
Rank	Athlete
1st place, gold medalist(s)	Forrest Molinari (USA)
2nd place, silver medalist(s)	Soleymi Caraballo (VEN)
3rd place, bronze medalist(s)	Nicoll Parrado (COL)
3rd place, bronze medalist(s)	Olivia Di Bacco (CAN)
5	Virginia Jiménez (CHI)
5	Ámbar Garnica (MEX)
7	Brenda Sterling (CUB)
8	Yanet Sovero (PER)
9	Saidy Chávez (HON)
