= Wrestling at the 2019 Pan American Games – Women's freestyle 62 kg =

Women's Freestyle 62 kg at the 2019 Pan American Games
- Venue: Miguel Grau Coliseum
- Dates: August 8
- Competitors: 8 from 8 nations

Medalists
Gold medal	Kayla Miracle	United States
Silver medal	Jackeline Rentería	Colombia
Bronze medal	Laís Nunes	Brazil
Bronze medal	Abnelis Yambo	Puerto Rico

The women's freestyle 62 kg competition of the Wrestling events at the 2019 Pan American Games in Lima was held on August 9 at the Miguel Grau Coliseum.

== Results ==
All times are local (UTC−5)

=== Final ===
Quarterfinals		Semifinals		Finals
Kayla Miracle (USA)	8^{F}
Laís Nunes (BRA)	1	Kayla Miracle (USA)	10^{F}
Yaquelin Estornell (CUB)	4	Nathaly Grimán (VEN)	0
Nathaly Grimán (VEN)	8			Kayla Miracle (USA)	12
Abnelis Yambo (PUR)	10			Jackeline Rentería (COL)	0
Jannette Mallqui (PER)	0	Abnelis Yambo (PUR)	0
Mayra Antes (ECU)	0	Jackeline Rentería (COL)	10
Jackeline Rentería (COL)	3

=== Repechage ===
Bronze medal match
Laís Nunes (BRA)	4
Nathaly Grimán (VEN)	1
Mayra Antes (ECU)	2
Abnelis Yambo (PUR)	4^{F}
