= Wrestling at the 2019 Pan American Games – Women's freestyle 76 kg =

Women's Freestyle 76 kg at the 2019 Pan American Games
- Venue: Miguel Grau Coliseum
- Dates: August 8
- Competitors: 9 from 9 nations

Medalists
Gold medal	Justina Di Stasio	Canada
Silver medal	Aline Ferreira	Brazil
Bronze medal	Mabelkis Capote	Cuba
Bronze medal	Andrea Olaya	Colombia

The women's freestyle 76 kg competition of the Wrestling events at the 2019 Pan American Games in Lima was held on August 9 at the Miguel Grau Coliseum.

== Results ==
All times are local (UTC−5)

Legend

- F — Won by fall

=== Final ===
Quarterfinals		Semifinals		Finals
Aline Ferreira (BRA)	7
Diana Cruz (PER)	0	Aline Ferreira (BRA)	2
Mabelkis Capote (CUB)	3	Mabelkis Capote (CUB)	1
Génesis Reasco (ECU)	1			Aline Ferreira (BRA)	1
Justina Di Stasio (CAN)	10			Justina Di Stasio (CAN)	2
Andrimar Lázaro (VEN)	0	Justina Di Stasio (CAN)	9
Andrea Olaya (COL)	3^{F}	Andrea Olaya (COL)	0
Josselyn Portillo (ESA)	0

=== Repechage ===
Bronze medal match
Diana Cruz (PER)	0
Mabelkis Capote (CUB)	10
Andrimar Lázaro (VEN)	0
Andrea Olaya (COL)	4
