= Laís Nunes =

Brazilian freestyle wrestler (born 1992)

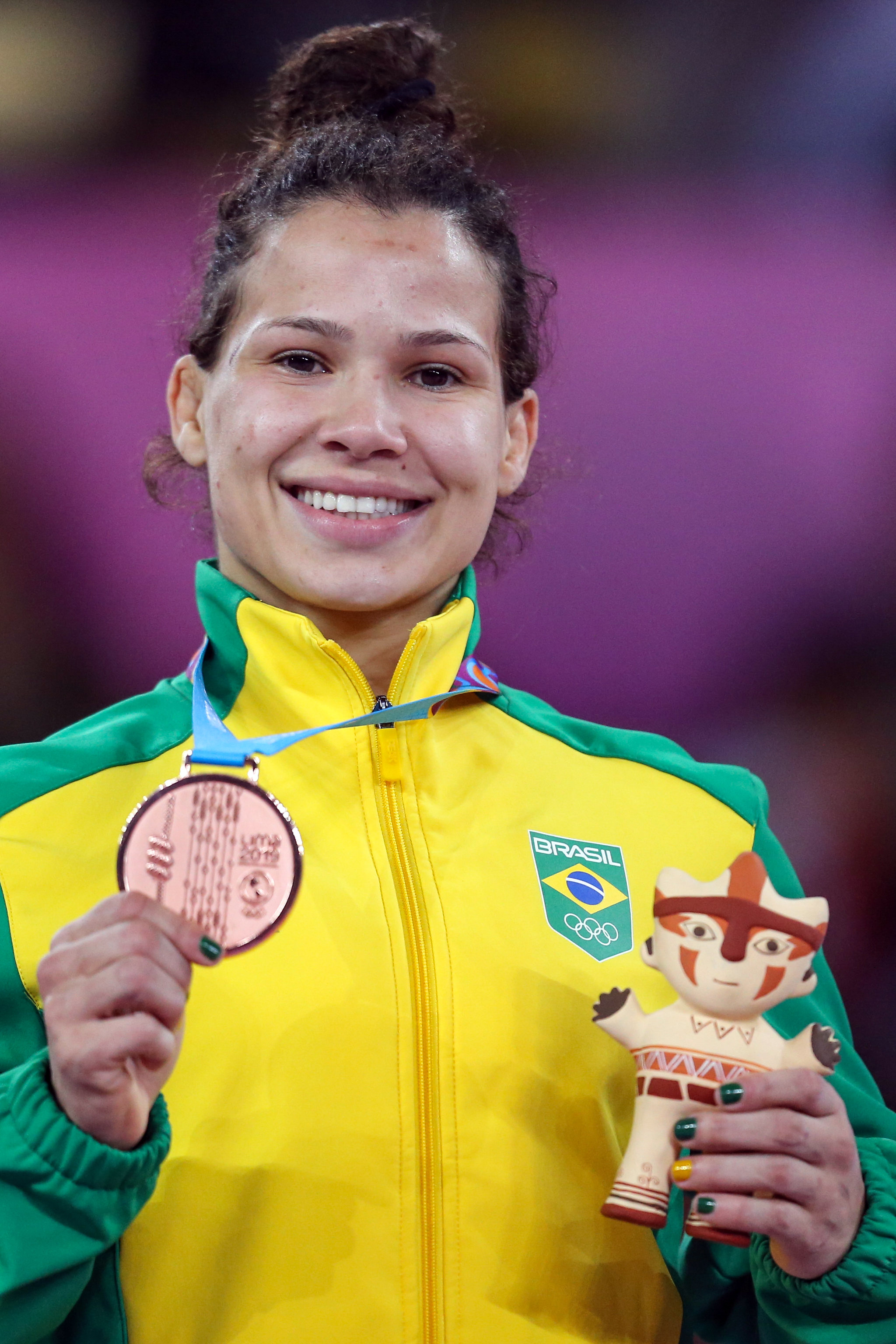
- Nunes in 2019

Personal information
- Full name: Laís Nunes de Oliveira
- Born: 3 November 1992 (age 33) Barro Alto, Goiás, Brazil
- Height: 165 cm (5 ft 5 in)
- Weight: 65 kg (143 lb)

Sport
- Country: Brazil
- Sport: Amateur wrestling
- Event: Freestyle
Medal record
Women's freestyle wrestling
Representing Brazil
Pan American Games
Gold medal – first place	2023 Santiago	62 kg
Bronze medal – third place	2019 Lima	62 kg
Pan American Championships
Gold medal – first place	2016 Frisco	63 kg
Gold medal – first place	2019 B.Aires	62 kg
Silver medal – second place	2014 Mexico City	60 kg
Silver medal – second place	2018 Lima	62 kg
Silver medal – second place	2020 Ottawa	62 kg
Silver medal – second place	2021 Guatemala	62 kg
Bronze medal – third place	2012 C.Springs	59 kg
Bronze medal – third place	2013 Panama City	63 kg
Bronze medal – third place	2022 Acapulco	62 kg
Bronze medal – third place	2023 B.Aires	62 kg
Bronze medal – third place	2024 Acapulco	62 kg
South American Games
Gold medal – first place	2018 Cochabamba	62 kg
Silver medal – second place	2014 Santiago	63 kg

Laís Nunes de Oliveira (born 3 November 1992) is a Brazilian freestyle wrestler. She competed in the women's freestyle 63 kg event at the 2016 Summer Olympics, in which she was eliminated in the round of 32 by Hafize Şahin.

== Career ==
She represented Brazil at the 2020 Summer Olympics. She competed in the women's freestyle 62 kg event.

In 2022, she competed at the Yasar Dogu Tournament held in Istanbul, Turkey. She won one of the bronze medals in her event at the 2022 Pan American Wrestling Championships held in Acapulco, Mexico. A month later, she won the bronze medal in her event at the Matteo Pellicone Ranking Series 2022 held in Rome, Italy. She won the silver medal in her event at the 2022 Tunis Ranking Series event held in Tunis, Tunisia. She won the gold medal in her event at the 2022 South American Games held in Asunción, Paraguay.

She won one of the bronze medals in the women's 62 kg event at the Grand Prix de France Henri Deglane 2023 held in Nice, France. She also won one of the bronze medals in her event at the 2023 Pan American Wrestling Championships held in Buenos Aires, Argentina.

Nunes won the gold medal in the women's 62 kg event at the 2023 Pan American Games held in Santiago, Chile. She defeated María Santana of Cuba in her gold medal match.

Nunes won a bronze medal in the women's 62 kg event at the 2024 Pan American Wrestling Championships held in Acapulco, Mexico. A few days later, she competed at the 2024 Pan American Wrestling Olympic Qualification Tournament held in Acapulco, Mexico hoping to qualify for the 2024 Summer Olympics in Paris, France. She was eliminated in her second match by Ana Godinez of Canada.

== Achievements ==
Year	Tournament	Location	Result	Event
2019	Pan American Games	Lima, Peru	3rd	Freestyle 62 kg
2023	Pan American Games	Santiago, Chile	1st	Freestyle 62 kg
