= Sargis Khachatryan (wrestler) =

Brazilian Greco-Roman wrestler

Sport
- Country: Brazil
- Sport: Amateur wrestling
- Weight class: 55 kg
- Event: Greco-Roman
Medal record
Men's Greco-Roman wrestling
Representing Brazil
Pan American Wrestling Championships
Gold medal – first place	2018 Lima	55 kg
Silver medal – second place	2019 Buenos Aires	55 kg
Bronze medal – third place	2020 Ottawa	55 kg

Sargis Khachatryan is a Brazilian Greco-Roman wrestler. He is of Armenian descent. He competed at the Pan American Wrestling Championships three times: at the 2020 Pan American Wrestling Championships held in Ottawa, Canada he won the bronze medal in the 55 kg event, in 2019 he won the silver medal and at the 2018 Pan American Wrestling Championships held in Lima, Peru he won the gold medal in this event.

== Achievements ==
Year	Tournament	Location	Result	Event
2018	Pan American Wrestling Championships	Lima, Peru	1st	Greco-Roman 55 kg
2019	Pan American Wrestling Championships	Buenos Aires, Argentina	2nd	Greco-Roman 55 kg
2020	Pan American Wrestling Championships	Ottawa, Canada	3rd	Greco-Roman 55 kg
