= Ámbar Garnica =

Mexican freestyle wrestler

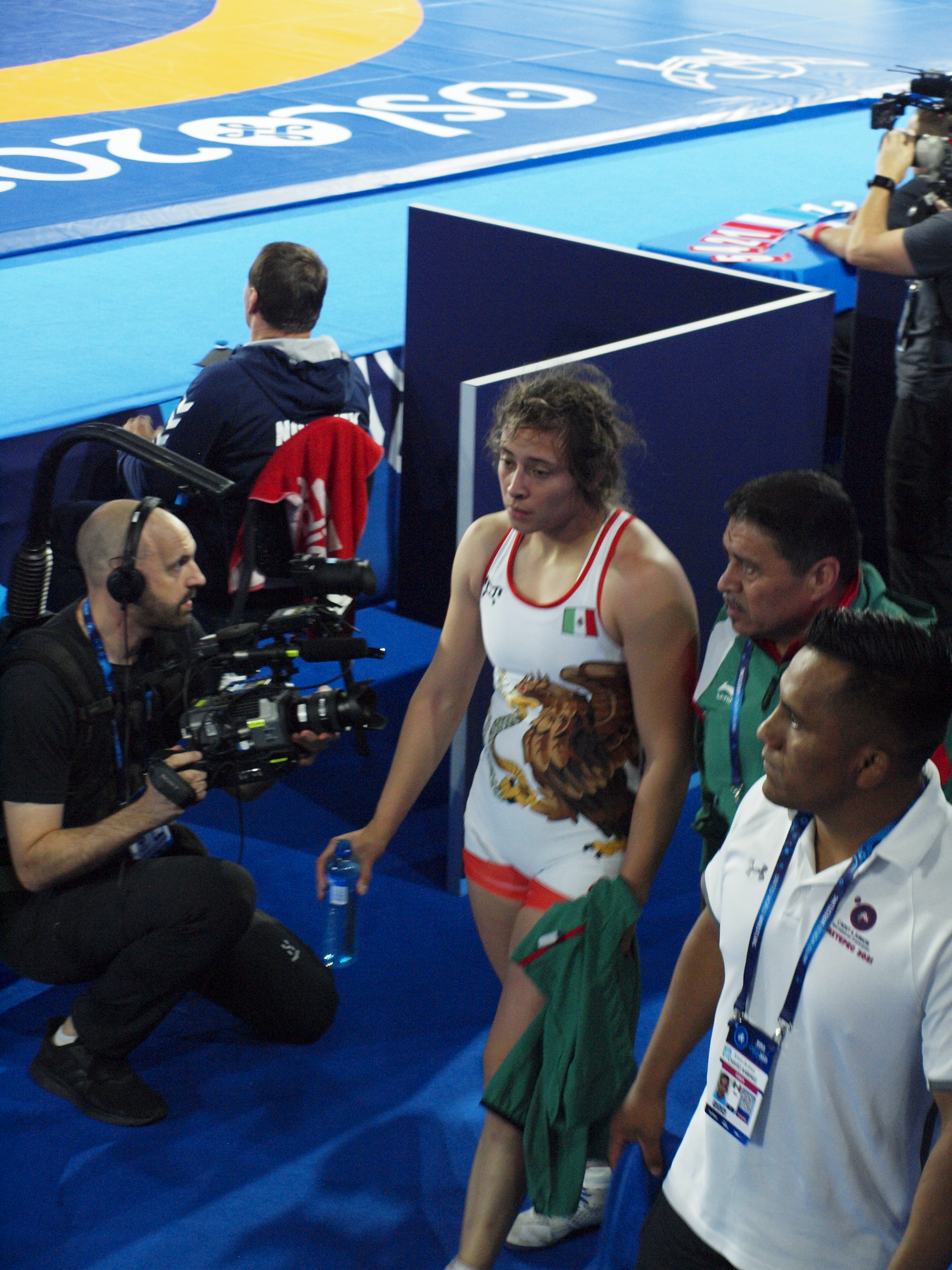
- Garnica at the 2021 World Wrestling Championships in Oslo, Norway

Personal information
- Full name: Ámbar Michell Garnica Flores

Sport
- Country: Mexico
- Sport: Amateur wrestling
- Weight class: 68 kg
- Event: Freestyle
Medal record
Representing Mexico
Women's freestyle wrestling
Pan American Games
Bronze medal – third place	2019 Lima	68 kg
Pan American Championships
Silver medal – second place	2023 Buenos Aires	68 kg
Bronze medal – third place	2019 Buenos Aires	68 kg
Central American and Caribbean Games
Silver medal – second place	2026 Santo Domingo	68 kg
Bronze medal – third place	2023 San Salvador	68 kg
Women's beach wrestling
Central American and Caribbean Beach Games
Silver medal – second place	2022 Santa Marta	70 kg

Ámbar Michell Garnica Flores (Note: In this Spanish name, the first or paternal surname is Garnica and the second or maternal family name is Flores.) is a Mexican freestyle wrestler. At the 2019 Pan American Games held in Lima, Peru, she won one of the bronze medals in the 68 kg event. She also won medals at the Pan American Wrestling Championships and the Central American and Caribbean Games.

== Career ==
In 2019, at the World Wrestling Championships held in Nur-Sultan, Kazakhstan, Garnica competed in the 68 kg event where she was eliminated in her first match. In May 2021, she failed to qualify for the Olympics at the World Olympic Qualification Tournament held in Sofia, Bulgaria. In October 2021, Garnica competed in the 68 kg event at the World Wrestling Championships held in Oslo, Norway. She also competed in the 68 kg event at the 2022 World Wrestling Championships held in Belgrade, Serbia.

In 2023, Garnica won the silver medal in the women's 68 kg event at the Pan American Wrestling Championships held in Buenos Aires, Argentina. She also won one of the bronze medals in her event at the 2023 Central American and Caribbean Games held in San Salvador, El Salvador. In the same year, Garnica competed in her event at the Pan American Games held in Santiago, Chile.

Garnica competed at the 2024 Pan American Wrestling Olympic Qualification Tournament held in Acapulco, Mexico hoping to qualify for the 2024 Summer Olympics in Paris, France. She was eliminated in her first match. Garnica also competed at the 2024 World Wrestling Olympic Qualification Tournament held in Istanbul, Turkey without qualifying for the Olympics. She was eliminated in her first match.

== Achievements ==
Year	Tournament	Location	Result	Event
2019	Pan American Wrestling Championships	Buenos Aires, Argentina	3rd	Freestyle 68 kg
2019	Pan American Games	Lima, Peru	3rd	Freestyle 68 kg
2022	Central American and Caribbean Beach Games	Santa Marta, Colombia	2nd	Beach wrestling 70 kg
2023	Pan American Wrestling Championships	Buenos Aires, Argentina	2nd	Freestyle 68 kg
2023	Central American and Caribbean Games	San Salvador, El Salvador	3rd	Freestyle 68 kg
2026	Central American and Caribbean Games	Santo Domingo, Dominican Republic	2nd	Freestyle 68 kg
