= Anthony Montero =

Venezuelan sport wrestler (born 1997)

Personal information
- Full name: Anthony Jose Montero Chirinos
- Born: 24 May 1997 (age 29) Punta Cardón, Venezuela

Sport
- Country: Venezuela
- Sport: Wrestling
- Weight class: 74 kg
- Event: Freestyle
Medal record
Men's freestyle wrestling
Representing Venezuela
Pan American Games
Bronze medal – third place	2023 Santiago	74 kg
Central American and Caribbean Games
Gold medal – first place	2023 San Salvador	74 kg
Bronze medal – third place	2018 Barranquilla	65 kg
South American Games
Gold medal – first place	2022 Asunción	74 kg
Gold medal – first place	2018 Cochabamba	65 kg
Bolivarian Games
Gold medal – first place	2022 Valledupar	74 kg
Pan American Championships
Silver medal – second place	2025 Monterrey	74 kg
Bronze medal – third place	2024 Acapulco	74 kg
Bronze medal – third place	2020 Ottawa	74 kg
Central American & Caribbean Championship
Bronze medal – third place	2018 Barranquilla	65 kg
Grand Prix
Silver medal – second place	2024 Madrid	74 kg
Silver medal – second place	2024 Sassari	74 kg
Silver medal – second place	2023 Sassari	74 kg
Summer Youth Olympics
Silver medal – second place	2014 Nanjing	63 kg
U20 Pan American Championships
Gold medal – first place	2017 Lima	66 kg
Gold medal – first place	2016 Barinas	66 kg
Silver medal – second place	2015 Havana	66 kg

Anthony José Montero Chirinos (Note: In this Spanish name, the first or paternal surname is Montero and the second or maternal family name is Chirinos.) (born 24 May 1997) is a Venezuelan freestyle wrestler who competes at 74 kilograms.

== Career ==
In 2023, he represented Venezuela at the Pan American Games and the Central American and Caribbean Games, earning bronze and gold respectively. He is also a gold medalist at the South American Games and the Bolivarian Games.

In 2024, Montero represented Venezuela at the 2024 Summer Olympics, after qualifying by reaching the finals at the Pan American Olympic Qualification Tournament. He competed in the men's freestyle 74 kg event at the Olympics.
