= Patrick Martinez =

American visual artist

Patrick Martinez (born 1980) is a visual artist based in Los Angeles. He works in mixed-media landscape paintings, neon sign artwork, as well as his Pee Chee collection of works. One of his signature styles of art is depicting and memorializing victims of abuse as the subjects of his art.

== Biography ==
Patrick Martinez was born in Los Angeles in 1980 to mixed race parents of Filipino, Mexican, and Native American descent. He spent his childhood residing in Los Angeles which influences much of his art. He is known for mixed media landscape, painting, and neon artwork that often speaks out for diversity and justice. His work has been exhibited all over the world but can be seen at LACMA as well as the Charlie James Gallery in Los Angeles. The importance of diversity, immigration, and racism are all common themes of his work, which aims to shed light upon the growing issue of inequality. Growing up in Los Angeles, California, Patrick Martinez has recounted unfair interactions with police officers. These interactions with law enforcement often left him feeling harassed. One of his first known pieces is his Pee- Chee All Season Portfolio, which was a collection of illustrations, doodles, and helpful tips for how to conduct oneself during a police encounter. Many of his works draw upon feelings of profiling and mistreatment from police. The art of Patrick Martinez often falls into the category of Social History of Art. This is because many of his pieces are indistinguishably linked to social and political events that occurred at the same time he created them. These social events which occurring alongside his art gave them context in how the art should be viewed.

== Education ==
Martinez earned a Bachelors in Fine Arts with Honors from Art Center College of Design in 2005. In 2021, he was awarded the Rauschenberg Residency, an artist-in-residence program at artist Robert Rauschenberg's former residence in Captiva Island, Florida, but due to the outbreak of Covid-19, the residency was postponed.

== Artworks ==
His most notable artworks are his "Po-lice Misconduct Misprint- Lost Colors Series". This series depicts victims of police brutality and pays homage to those victims. In the wake of the murder of George Floyd on May 25, 2020, Martinez responded through art with the creation of his "Racism Doesn't Rest During a Pandemic Pee Chee" (No Justice No Peace 2020). This piece depicts the faces of George Floyd, Breonna Taylor, and Ahmaud Arbery, who all died at the hands of police. Patrick Martinez's childhood experiences of racism and his diverse ethnic background gave him a voice to speak out against racism and police brutality through his art.

Patrick Martinez has exhibited both locally and internationally. Cities such as Los Angeles, Minneapolis, New York, and even The Netherlands have all housed his exhibitions. The Smithsonian National Portrait Gallery, The Albright- Knox Art Gallery, the Cornell Fine Arts Museum are all museums which have displayed Martinez's art. As well as the Charlie James Gallery in Los Angeles Patrick's work can be seen in a permanent collection at LACMA.

In the Fall of 2021 Patrick's artwork will also be exhibited in the Tucson Museum of Art as part of a solo exhibition.

== Exhibitions ==
Solo Exhibitions: Exhibition / Organization / Location / Date; Forbidden Fruit / New Image Gallery / Los Angeles, California / 2015; America Is For Dreamers / Vincent Price Art Museum / Los Angeles, California / 2017; American Memorial / Cornell Fine Arts Museum / Winter Park, Florida / 2017; Po-lice / Occidental College / Los Angeles, California / 2017; All Season Portfolio / Charlie James Gallery / Los Angeles, California / 2017; Remembering To Forget / Charlie James Gallery / Los Angeles, California / 2018; That Which We Do Not See / Fort Gansevoort / New York City, New York / 2019; Group Shows
Exhibition	Organization	Location	Date
No Struggle, No Progress	Rock Rose Gallery	Los Angeles, California	2003
Keep It Real	Show And Tell Gallery	Toronto, Canada	2010
All In For The 99%	New Image Art, Ace Museum	Los Angeles, California	2012
A Sign Only Has To Serve As A Sign	Providence College Galleries	Providence, Rhode Island	2015
Mooncakes, Churros, And Cherry Pie	Euphrat Museum Of Art	Cupertino, California	2015
Southland	Charlie James Gallery	Los Angeles, California	2016
Flash Point 2017: Twenty-Five Years After The 1992 Los Angeles Uprising	UCLA	Los Angeles, California	2017
Sidelined	Galerie LeLong	New York City, NY	2018
Fictions	Studio Museum	Harlem, New York City, NY	2018

=== Special projects ===
Exhibition	Organization	Location	Date
Pee- Chee Folder Edition, 10 Rules Of Survival If Stopped By The Police	Occidental College	Los Angeles, California	2017
Pee- Chee Folder, Flash Point 2017: Twenty-Five Years After The 1992 Los Angeles Uprising	UCLA	Los Angeles, California	2017
LA Origin City Wide Campaign	Presented By The Mayors Fund	Los Angeles, California	2017

== Collections ==
His artwork is held in the permanent collection of several museums including the Smithsonian African American Museum of History and Culture, Los Angeles County Museum of Art, Autry Museum of the American West, Cornell Fine Arts Museum, Columbus Museum of Art, Crocker Art Museum, and Museum of Latin American Art.

== Bibliography ==
WHAT RESONATES: SOUTHLAND AT CHARLIE JAMES GALLERY - ESSENCE HARDEN — AUGUST 22, 2016

Splinter - June 29, 2016 - Iconic ‘Pee-Chee’ folders reimagined with familiar scenes of police brutality - By Jorge Rivas
