= Wrestling at the 2019 Pan American Games =

- Wrestling pictogram
- Venue: Miguel Grau Coliseum
- Dates: August 7–10, 2019
- No. of events: 18 (12 men, 6 women)
- Competitors: 149

Wrestling competitions at the 2019 Pan American Games in Lima were held between August 7 and 10, 2019 at the Miguel Grau Coliseum in the Villa Deportiva Regional del Callao cluster.

The competition is split into two disciplines, Freestyle and Greco-Roman which were further divided into different weight categories. Men competed in both disciplines whereas women only took part in the freestyle events, with 18 gold medals awarded (12 for men and six for women). Wrestling has been contested at every Pan American Games.

== Medal table ==
* Host nation (Peru)

Rank	Nation	Gold	Silver	Bronze	Total
1	United States	9	2	4	15
2	Cuba	5	2	9	16
3	Ecuador	2	0	1	3
4	Venezuela	1	5	2	8
5	Canada	1	1	4	6
6	Colombia	0	2	4	6
7	Dominican Republic	0	2	2	4
8	Mexico	0	2	1	3
9	Brazil	0	1	2	3
9	Puerto Rico	0	1	2	3
11	Peru*	0	0	2	2
12	Chile	0	0	1	1
12	Honduras	0	0	1	1
12	Panama	0	0	1	1
Totals (14 entries)		18	18	36	72

== Medalists ==
=== Men's events ===
Freestyle

Event	Gold	Silver	Bronze
57 kg	Daton Fix; United States	Juan Rubelín Ramírez; Dominican Republic	Reineri Andreu; Cuba
57 kg	Daton Fix; United States	Juan Rubelín Ramírez; Dominican Republic	Darthe Capellan; Canada
65 kg	Alejandro Valdés; Cuba	Álbaro Rudesindo; Dominican Republic	Mauricio Sánchez; Ecuador
65 kg	Alejandro Valdés; Cuba	Álbaro Rudesindo; Dominican Republic	Jaydin Eierman; United States
74 kg	Jordan Burroughs; United States	Franklin Gómez; Puerto Rico	Geandry Garzón; Cuba
74 kg	Jordan Burroughs; United States	Franklin Gómez; Puerto Rico	Jevon Balfour; Canada
86 kg	Yurieski Torreblanca; Cuba	Pedro Ceballos; Venezuela	Carlos Izquierdo; Colombia
86 kg	Yurieski Torreblanca; Cuba	Pedro Ceballos; Venezuela	Pat Downey; United States
97 kg	Kyle Snyder; United States	José Daniel Díaz; Venezuela	Luis Miguel Pérez; Dominican Republic
97 kg	Kyle Snyder; United States	José Daniel Díaz; Venezuela	Reineris Salas; Cuba
125 kg	Nick Gwiazdowski; United States	Óscar Pino; Cuba	Luis Vivenes; Venezuela
125 kg	Nick Gwiazdowski; United States	Óscar Pino; Cuba	Korey Jarvis; Canada

Greco-Roman

Event	Gold	Silver	Bronze
60 kg	Andrés Montaño; Ecuador	Dicther Toro; Colombia	Luis Orta; Cuba
60 kg	Andrés Montaño; Ecuador	Dicther Toro; Colombia	Ildar Hafizov; United States
67 kg^{[a]}	Ismael Borrero; Cuba	Manuel López; Mexico	Ellis Coleman; United States
67 kg^{[a]}	Ismael Borrero; Cuba	Manuel López; Mexico	Nilton Soto; Peru
77 kg	Pat Smith; United States	Wuileixis Rivas; Venezuela	Jair Cuero; Colombia
77 kg	Pat Smith; United States	Wuileixis Rivas; Venezuela	Yosvanys Peña; Cuba
87 kg	Luis Avendaño; Venezuela	Alfonso Leyva; Mexico	Alvis Almendra; Panama
87 kg	Luis Avendaño; Venezuela	Alfonso Leyva; Mexico	Daniel Grégorich; Cuba
97 kg	Gabriel Rosillo; Cuba	G'Angelo Hancock; United States	Kevin Mejía; Honduras
97 kg	Gabriel Rosillo; Cuba	G'Angelo Hancock; United States	Luillys Pérez; Venezuela
130 kg	Mijaín López; Cuba	Moisés Pérez; Venezuela	Leo Santana; Dominican Republic
130 kg	Mijaín López; Cuba	Moisés Pérez; Venezuela	Yasmani Acosta; Chile

- ^{Men's Greco-Roman 67 kg} Shalom Villegas of Venezuela originally won the silver medal, but he was disqualified for doping violations.

=== Women's events ===
Freestyle

Event	Gold	Silver	Bronze
50 kg	Whitney Conder; United States	Yusneylys Guzmán; Cuba	Thalía Mallqui; Peru
50 kg	Whitney Conder; United States	Yusneylys Guzmán; Cuba	Carolina Castillo; Colombia
53 kg	Sarah Hildebrandt; United States	Betzabeth Argüello; Venezuela	Jade Parsons; Canada
53 kg	Sarah Hildebrandt; United States	Betzabeth Argüello; Venezuela	Lianna Montero; Cuba
57 kg	Lissette Antes; Ecuador	Jenna Burkert; United States	Giullia Penalber; Brazil
57 kg	Lissette Antes; Ecuador	Jenna Burkert; United States	Nes Marie Rodríguez; Puerto Rico
62 kg	Kayla Miracle; United States	Jackeline Rentería; Colombia	Abnelis Yambo; Puerto Rico
62 kg	Kayla Miracle; United States	Jackeline Rentería; Colombia	Laís Nunes; Brazil
68 kg	Tamyra Mensah; United States	Olivia Di Bacco; Canada	Yudaris Sánchez; Cuba
68 kg	Tamyra Mensah; United States	Olivia Di Bacco; Canada	Ámbar Garnica; Mexico
76 kg	Justina Di Stasio; Canada	Aline Ferreira; Brazil	Mabelkis Capote; Cuba
76 kg	Justina Di Stasio; Canada	Aline Ferreira; Brazil	Andrea Olaya; Colombia

== Qualification ==
A total of 150 wrestlers qualified to compete at the games. The winner of each weight category at the 2018 South American Games and 2018 Central American and Caribbean Games and the top three at the 2018 Pan American Championships qualified for the Games. The top three at the 2019 Pan American Championships also qualified. The host country (Peru) was guaranteed a spot in each event, but its athletes were required to compete in both the 2018 and 2019 Pan American Championship. A further six wildcards (four men and two women) were awarded to nations without any qualified athlete but took part in the qualification tournaments.

== See also ==
- Wrestling at the 2020 Summer Olympics
