= Mabelkis Capote =

Cuban freestyle wrestler

Personal information
- Full name: Mabelkis Capote Perez
- Born: 5 June 1998 (age 28)
- Height: 172 cm (5 ft 8 in)

Sport
- Country: Cuba
- Sport: Amateur wrestling
- Weight class: 76 kg
- Event: Freestyle
Medal record
Women's freestyle wrestling
Representing Cuba
Pan American Wrestling Championships
Bronze medal – third place	2018 Lima	76 kg
Pan American Games
Bronze medal – third place	2019 Lima	76 kg
Central American and Caribbean Games
Bronze medal – third place	2018 Barranquilla	76 kg

Mabelkis Capote Perez (born 5 June 1998) is a Cuban freestyle wrestler. At the 2019 Pan American Games held in Lima, Peru, she won one of the bronze medals in the 76 kg event.

At the 2018 Pan American Wrestling Championships held in Lima, Peru, she won one of the bronze medals in the women's 76 kg event. In 2018, she also won the bronze medal in the 76 kg event at the Central American and Caribbean Games held in Barranquilla, Colombia.

== Achievements ==
Year	Tournament	Location	Result	Event
2018	Pan American Wrestling Championships	Lima, Peru	3rd	Freestyle 76 kg
2018	Central American and Caribbean Games	Barranquilla, Colombia	3rd	Freestyle 76 kg
2019	Pan American Games	Lima, Peru	3rd	Freestyle 76 kg
