= Luis Avendaño =

Venezuelan Greco-Roman wrestler

Personal information
- Full name: Luis Eduardo Avendaño Rojas
- Born: 29 November 1992 (age 33)

Sport
- Country: Venezuela
- Sport: Amateur wrestling
- Weight class: 87 kg
- Event: Greco-Roman
Medal record
Men's Greco-Roman wrestling
Representing Venezuela
Pan American Games
Gold medal – first place	2019 Lima	87 kg
Silver medal – second place	2023 Santiago	87 kg
Pan American Championships
Gold medal – first place	2018 Lima	82 kg
Gold medal – first place	2019 Buenos Aires	87 kg
Silver medal – second place	2023 Buenos Aires	87 kg
Silver medal – second place	2024 Acapulco	87 kg
Silver medal – second place	2025 Monterrey	87 kg
Bronze medal – third place	2026 Coralville	87 kg
Grand Prix
Bronze medal – third place	2026 Ulaanbaatar	87 kg
South American Games
Gold medal – first place	2022 Asunción	87 kg
Silver medal – second place	2018 Cochabamba	77 kg
Bolivarian Games
Silver medal – second place	2022 Valledupar	87 kg
Central American and Caribbean Games
Silver medal – second place	2018 Barranquilla	77 kg
Bronze medal – third place	2026 Santo Domingo	87 kg

Luis Eduardo Avendaño Rojas (Note: In this Spanish name, the first or paternal surname is Avendaño and the second or maternal family name is Rojas.) (born 29 November 1992) is a Venezuelan Greco-Roman wrestler. He won the gold medal in the men's 87 kg event at the 2019 Pan American Games in Lima, Peru and the 2022 South American Games in Asunción, Paraguay. He is also a two-time gold medalist at the Pan American Wrestling Championships.

== Career ==
Avendaño won the silver medal at the 2018 Central American and Caribbean Games held in Barranquilla, Colombia in the men's 77 kg event.

At the 2019 Pan American Wrestling Championships held in Buenos Aires, Argentina, he won the gold medal in the men's 87 kg event. In 2018, he won the gold medal in the men's 82 kg event at the Pan American Wrestling Championships held in Lima, Peru.

At the 2019 Pan American Games held in Lima, Peru, he won the gold medal in the men's 87 kg event. In the final, he defeated Alfonso Leyva of Mexico.

In March 2020, Avendaño competed at the Pan American Olympic Qualification Tournament in Ottawa, Canada, without qualifying for the 2020 Summer Olympics in Tokyo, Japan. In May 2021, he also failed to qualify for the Olympics at the World Olympic Qualification Tournament held in Sofia, Bulgaria.

Avendaño won the silver medal in his event at the 2022 Bolivarian Games held in Valledupar, Colombia. He won the gold medal in his event at the 2022 South American Games held in Asunción, Paraguay.

Avendaño won the silver medal in his event at the 2024 Pan American Wrestling Championships held in Acapulco, Mexico. A few days later, he competed at the 2024 Pan American Wrestling Olympic Qualification Tournament held in Acapulco, Mexico hoping to qualify for the 2024 Summer Olympics in Paris, France. He was eliminated in his second match.

In 2025, Avendaño won the silver medal in the men's 87 kg event at the Pan American Wrestling Championships in Monterrey, Mexico. He reached the final before losing to Payton Jacobson.

== Achievements ==
Year	Tournament	Location	Result	Event
2018	South American Games	Cochabamba, Bolivia	2nd	Greco-Roman 77 kg
2018	Central American and Caribbean Games	Barranquilla, Colombia	2nd	Greco-Roman 77 kg
2019	Pan American Games	Lima, Peru	1st	Greco-Roman 87 kg
2022	Bolivarian Games	Valledupar, Colombia	2nd	Greco-Roman 87 kg
2022	South American Games	Asunción, Paraguay	1st	Greco-Roman 87 kg
2023	Pan American Games	Santiago, Chile	2nd	Greco-Roman 87 kg
