= Carlos Muñoz (wrestler) =

Colombian Greco-Roman wrestler

Personal information
- Full name: Carlos Andrés Muñoz Jaramillo
- Nationality: Colombian
- Born: 3 August 1992 (age 33) La Ceja, Antioquia, Colombia

Sport
- Country: Colombia
- Style: Greco-Roman
Medal record
Representing Colombia
Event	1st	2nd	3rd
Golden Grand Prix	0	0	1
Pan American Games	0	0	2
Pan American Championships	0	1	7
CAC Games	0	1	2
South American Games	1	1	0
Bolivarian Games	2	1	1
South American Beach Games	0	1	0
Total	3	5	13
Men's Greco-Roman wrestling
Golden Grand Prix
Bronze medal – third place	2016 Baku	80 kg
Pan American Games
Bronze medal – third place	2015 Toronto	75 kg
Bronze medal – third place	2023 Santiago	87 kg
Pan American Championships
Silver medal – second place	2020 Ottawa	87 kg
Bronze medal – third place	2014 Mexico City	80 kg
Bronze medal – third place	2015 Santiago	75 kg
Bronze medal – third place	2016 Frisco	80 kg
Bronze medal – third place	2017 Salvador	85 kg
Bronze medal – third place	2022 Acapulco	87 kg
Bronze medal – third place	2023 Buenos Aires	87 kg
Bronze medal – third place	2024 Acapulco	87 kg
Central American and Caribbean Games
Silver medal – second place	2023 San Salvador	87 kg
Bronze medal – third place	2014 Veracruz	75 kg
Bronze medal – third place	2018 Barranquilla	87 kg
South American Games
Gold medal – first place	2018 Cochabamba	87 kg
Silver medal – second place	2014 Santiago	75 kg
Bolivarian Games
Gold medal – first place	2017 Santa Marta	85 kg
Gold medal – first place	2022 Valledupar	87 kg
Silver medal – second place	2025 Lima-Ayacucho	87 kg
Bronze medal – third place	2013 Trujillo	74 kg
Men's Beach wrestling
South American Beach Games
Silver medal – second place	2023 Santa Marta	90 kg

Carlos Andrés Muñoz Jaramillo (Note: In this Spanish name, the first or paternal surname is Muñoz and the second or maternal family name is Jaramillo.) (born 3 August 1992 in La Ceja, Antioquia) is an amateur Colombian Greco-Roman wrestler, who won a bronze medal at the 2015 Pan American Games in Toronto.

He won the gold medal in his event at the 2022 Bolivarian Games held in Valledupar, Colombia.

== Achievements ==
Year	Tournament	Location	Result	Event
Representing Colombia
2013	Bolivarian Games	Trujillo, Peru	3rd	Greco-Roman 74 kg
2014	South American Games	Santiago, Chile	2nd	Greco-Roman 75 kg
2014	Pan American Championships	Mexico City, Mexico	3rd	Greco-Roman 80 kg
2014	Central American and Caribbean Games	Veracruz, Mexico	3rd	Greco-Roman 75 kg
2015	Pan American Championships	Santiago, Chile	3rd	Greco-Roman 75 kg
2015	Pan American Games	Toronto, Canada	3rd	Greco–Roman 75 kg
2016	Pan American Championships	Frisco, United States	3rd	Greco-Roman 80 kg
2016	Golden Grand Prix	Baku, Azerbaijan	3rd	Greco-Roman 80 kg
2017	Pan American Championships	Salvador, Brasil	3rd	Greco-Roman 85 kg
2017	Bolivarian Games	Santa Marta, Colombia	1st	Greco-Roman 85 kg
2018	South American Games	Cochabamba, Bolivia	1st	Greco-Roman 87 kg
2018	Central American and Caribbean Games	Barranquilla, Colombia	3rd	Greco-Roman 87 kg
2020	Pan American Championships	Ottawa, Canada	2nd	Greco-Roman 87 kg
2022	Pan American Championships	Acapulco, Mexico	3rd	Greco-Roman 87 kg
2022	Bolivarian Games	Valledupar, Colombia	1st	Greco-Roman 87 kg
2023	Pan American Championships	Buenos Aires, Argentina	3rd	Greco-Roman 87 kg
2023	Central American and Caribbean Games	San Salvador, El Salvador	2nd	Greco-Roman 87 kg
2023	South American Beach Games	Santa Marta, Colombia	2nd	Beach wrestling 90 kg
2023	Pan American Games	Santiago, Chile	3rd	Greco–Roman 87 kg
2024	Pan American Championships	Acapulco, Mexico	3rd	Greco-Roman 87 kg
2025	Bolivarian Games	Lima, Peru	2nd	Greco-Roman 87 kg
