= Yanet Sovero =

Peruvian freestyle wrestler

Personal information
- Full name: Yanet Ursula Sovero Niño
- Born: 2 May 1983 (age 43)

Sport
- Country: Peru
Medal record
Women's freestyle wrestling
Representing Peru
Bolivarian Games
Silver medal – second place	2022 Valledupar	68 kg

Yanet Ursula Sovero Niño (Note: In this Spanish name, the first or paternal surname is Sovero and the second or maternal family name is Niño.) (born 2 May 1983) is a Peruvian freestyle wrestler. She competed in the women's freestyle 58 kg event at the 2016 Summer Olympics, in which she was eliminated in the round of 16 by Jackeline Rentería.

She won the silver medal in her event at the 2022 Bolivarian Games held in Valledupar, Colombia. She won the bronze medal in her event at the 2022 South American Games held in Asunción, Paraguay.

She won one of the bronze medals in the women's 68 kg event at the 2023 Pan American Wrestling Championships held in Buenos Aires, Argentina. In September 2023, she competed in the women's 68 kg event at the 2023 World Wrestling Championships held in Belgrade, Serbia. She competed in her event at the 2023 Pan American Games held in Santiago, Chile.
