= 2017 World Wrestling Championships – Women's freestyle 69 kg =

Women's freestyle 69 kg at the 2017 World Championships
- Venue: AccorHotels Arena
- Dates: 24 August 2017
- Competitors: 19 from 19 nations

Medalists
gold medal	Sara Dosho	Japan
silver medal	Aline Focken	Germany
bronze medal	Koumba Larroque	France
bronze medal	Han Yue	China

The women's freestyle 69 kilograms is a competition featured at the 2017 World Wrestling Championships, and was held in Paris, France on 24 August 2017.

This freestyle wrestling competition consisted of a single-elimination tournament, with a repechage used to determine the winners of two bronze medals.

== Results ==
Legend

- F — Won by fall

=== Final ===
Final
Sara Dosho (JPN)	3
Aline Focken (GER)	0

=== Top half ===
Round of 32

Round of 16
Sara Dosho (JPN)	3
Koumba Larroque (FRA)	3
Elis Manolova (AZE)	0
Anastasia Bratchikova (RUS)	10
Sofiya Georgieva (BUL)	0
Maryia Mamashuk (BLR)	10
Dailane Reis (BRA)	0
Martina Kuenz (AUT)	4^{F}

Quarterfinals
Sara Dosho (JPN)	8
Anastasia Bratchikova (RUS)	0
Maryia Mamashuk (BLR)	6
Martina Kuenz (AUT)	7

Semifinals
Sara Dosho (JPN)	6
Martina Kuenz (AUT)	0

=== Bottom half ===
Round of 32
Meerim Zhumanazarova (KGZ)	1
Ochirbatyn Nasanburmaa (MGL)	4
Kim Hye-bin (KOR)	0
Navjot Kaur (IND)	9
Aline Focken (GER)	12
Danutė Domikaitytė (LTU)	0

Round of 16
Alla Belinska (UKR)	2
Tamyra Mensah (USA)	12
Olivia Di Bacco (CAN)	0
Han Yue (CHN)	11
Ochirbatyn Nasanburmaa (MGL)	10
Navjot Kaur (IND)	5
Aline Focken (GER)	9
Elmira Syzdykova (KAZ)	3

Quarterfinals
Tamyra Mensah (USA)	2
Han Yue (CHN)	5
Ochirbatyn Nasanburmaa (MGL)	0
Aline Focken (GER)	10^{F}

Semifinals
Han Yue (CHN)	3
Aline Focken (GER)	5

=== Repechage ===
Repechage round 1
Danutė Domikaitytė (LTU)	2
Elmira Syzdykova (KAZ)	9^{F}

Repechage round 2
Koumba Larroque (FRA)	4
Anastasia Bratchikova (RUS)	1
Elmira Syzdykova (KAZ)	7
Ochirbatyn Nasanburmaa (MGL)	5

Bronze medals
Koumba Larroque (FRA)	6
Martina Kuenz (AUT)	0
Elmira Syzdykova (KAZ)	2
Han Yue (CHN)	10
