= 2025 World Wrestling Championships – Women's freestyle 68 kg =

Wrestling competitions

Women's freestyle 68 kg at the 2025 World Championships
- Venue: Arena Zagreb
- Dates: 17–18 September 2025
- Competitors: 24 from 23 nations

Medalists
gold medal	Ami Ishii	Japan
silver medal	Yuliana Yaneva	Bulgaria
bronze medal	Kennedy Blades	United States
bronze medal	Long Jia	China

The women's freestyle 68 kilograms is a competition featured at the 2025 World Wrestling Championships, and was held in Zagreb, Croatia on 17 and 18 September 2025.

This freestyle wrestling competition consists of a single-elimination tournament, with a repechage used to determine the winner of two bronze medals. The two finalists face off for gold and silver medals. Each wrestler who loses to one of the two finalists moves into the repechage, culminating in a pair of bronze medal matches, featuring the semifinal losers each facing the remaining repechage opponent from their half of the bracket.

== Results ==
Legend

- F — Won by fall
- WO — Won by walkover

=== Final ===
Final
Ami Ishii (JPN)	4
Yuliana Yaneva (BUL)	2

=== Top half ===
Round of 32
Gabriela Rocha (BRA)	6
Nabira Esenbaeva (UZB)	2
Beibit Seidualy (KAZ)	0
Park Hyeon-yeong (KOR)	4^{F}
Ami Ishii (JPN)	10
Manola Skobelska (UKR)	0
Radhika Jaglan (IND)	9^{F}
Laura Godino (ITA)	4

Round of 16
Buse Tosun Çavuşoğlu (TUR)	4^{F}
Gabriela Rocha (BRA)	1
Park Hyeon-yeong (KOR)	0
Adéla Hanzlíčková (CZE)	4^{F}
Noémi Szabados (HUN)	0
Ami Ishii (JPN)	11
Radhika Jaglan (IND)	0
Kennedy Blades (USA)	11

Quarterfinals
Buse Tosun Çavuşoğlu (TUR)	3
Adéla Hanzlíčková (CZE)	2
Ami Ishii (JPN)	12
Kennedy Blades (USA)	1

Semifinals
Buse Tosun Çavuşoğlu (TUR)	0
Ami Ishii (JPN)	11

=== Bottom half ===
Round of 32
Yuliana Yaneva (BUL)	7^{F}
Khanum Velieva (UWW)	1
Sophia Schäfle (GER)	5^{F}
Albina Drazhi (ALB)	3
Tindra Sjöberg (SWE)	0
Long Jia (CHN)	10
Aniseta Acosta (ASA)	WO
~~Hannah Reuben (NGR)~~

Round of 16
Pak Sol-gum (PRK)	6
Yuliana Yaneva (BUL)	7
Sophia Schäfle (GER)	2
Kateryna Zelenykh (ROU)	10
Enkhsaikhany Delgermaa (MGL)	6
Long Jia (CHN)	12
Aniseta Acosta (ASA)	0
Meerim Zhumanazarova (KGZ)	10

Quarterfinals
Yuliana Yaneva (BUL)	8
Kateryna Zelenykh (ROU)	4
Long Jia (CHN)	4
Meerim Zhumanazarova (KGZ)	1

Semifinals
Yuliana Yaneva (BUL)	6
Long Jia (CHN)	1

=== Repechage ===
Repechage round 1
Manola Skobelska (UKR)	6
Noémi Szabados (HUN)	2
Khanum Velieva (UWW)	0
Pak Sol-gum (PRK)	6

Repechage round 2
Manola Skobelska (UKR)	2
Kennedy Blades (USA)	9
Pak Sol-gum (PRK)	8^{F}
Kateryna Zelenykh (ROU)	4

Bronze medals
Kennedy Blades (USA)	12
Buse Tosun Çavuşoğlu (TUR)	1
Pak Sol-gum (PRK)	1
Long Jia (CHN)	6

== Final standing ==
Rank	Athlete
1st place, gold medalist(s)	Ami Ishii (JPN)
2nd place, silver medalist(s)	Yuliana Yaneva (BUL)
3rd place, bronze medalist(s)	Kennedy Blades (USA)
3rd place, bronze medalist(s)	Long Jia (CHN)
5	Buse Tosun Çavuşoğlu (TUR)
5	Pak Sol-gum (PRK)
7	Sophia Schäfle (GER)
8	Adéla Hanzlíčková (CZE)
9	Radhika Jaglan (IND)
10	Park Hyeon-yeong (KOR)
11	Meerim Zhumanazarova (KGZ)
12	Aniseta Acosta (ASA)
13	Kateryna Zelenykh (ROU)
14	Manola Skobelska (UKR)
15	Gabriela Rocha (BRA)
16	Enkhsaikhany Delgermaa (MGL)
17	Nabira Esenbaeva (UZB)
18	Noémi Szabados (HUN)
19	Laura Godino (ITA)
20	Albina Drazhi (ALB)
21	Khanum Velieva (UWW)
22	Beibit Seidualy (KAZ)
23	Tindra Sjöberg (SWE)
—	Hannah Reuben (NGR)
