= 2019 European Wrestling Championships – Women's freestyle 68 kg =

The women's freestyle 68 kg is a competition featured at the 2019 European Wrestling Championships, and was held in Bucharest, Romania on April 10 and April 11.

== Medalists ==
Gold	Alla Cherkasova; Ukraine
Silver	Adéla Hanzlíčková; Czech Republic
Bronze	Anastasija Grigorjeva; Latvia
Bronze	Jenny Fransson; Sweden

== Results ==
Legend

- F — Won by fall

=== Main bracket ===
1/8 finals
Adéla Hanzlíčková (CZE)	5
Danutė Domikaitytė (LTU)	3
Maria Selmaier (GER)	7
Sara Da Col (ITA)	0
Sofiya Georgieva (BUL)	7
Adina Popescu (ROU)	2
Yauheniya Andreichykava (BLR)	1
Irina Netreba (AZE)	1
Anastasia Bratchikova (RUS)	1
Jenny Fransson (SWE)	2
Alla Cherkasova (UKR)	12^{F}
Agnieszka Wieszczek (POL)	1

Quarterfinals
Anastasija Grigorjeva (LAT)	11
Merve Pul (TUR)	0
Adéla Hanzlíčková (CZE)	8^{F}
Maria Selmaier (GER)	2
Sofiya Georgieva (BUL)	2
Irina Netreba (AZE)	3
Jenny Fransson (SWE)	3
Alla Cherkasova (UKR)	4

Semifinals
Anastasija Grigorjeva (LAT)	2
Adéla Hanzlíčková (CZE)	7
Irina Netreba (AZE)	0
Alla Cherkasova (UKR)	11

Final
Adéla Hanzlíčková (CZE)	6
Alla Cherkasova (UKR)	11

=== Repechage ===
Repechage round 1
Danutė Domikaitytė (LTU)	8^{F}
Maria Selmaier (GER)	0
Agnieszka Wieszczek (POL)	1
Jenny Fransson (SWE)	4

Bronze medal match
Danutė Domikaitytė (LTU)	3
Anastasija Grigorjeva (LAT)	8
Jenny Fransson (SWE)	5
Irina Netreba (AZE)	2
