= 2018 World Wrestling Championships – Women's freestyle 68 kg =

Women's freestyle 68 kg at the 2018 World Championships
- Venue: László Papp Budapest Sports Arena
- Dates: 23–24 October 2018
- Competitors: 26 from 26 nations

Medalists
gold medal	Alla Cherkasova	Ukraine
silver medal	Koumba Larroque	France
bronze medal	Zhou Feng	China
bronze medal	Tamyra Mensah-Stock	United States

The women's freestyle 68 kilograms is a competition featured at the 2018 World Wrestling Championships, and was held in Budapest, Hungary on 23 and 24 October.

This freestyle wrestling competition consists of a single-elimination tournament, with a repechage used to determine the winner of two bronze medals. The two finalists face off for gold and silver medals. Each wrestler who loses to one of the two finalists moves into the repechage, culminating in a pair of bronze medal matches featuring the semifinal losers each facing the remaining repechage opponent from their half of the bracket.

== Results ==
Legend

- F — Won by fall

=== Final ===
Final
Alla Cherkasova (UKR)	15
Koumba Larroque (FRA)	10

=== Top half ===
Round of 32
Anna Schell (GER)	2
Blessing Oborududu (NGR)	12
Elis Manolova (AZE)	1
Dalma Caneva (ITA)	3
Meerim Zhumanazarova (KGZ)	10
Vanessa Wilson (HUN)	0

Round of 16
Alla Cherkasova (UKR)	10
Maryia Mamashuk (BLR)	0
Soleymi Caraballo (VEN)	11
Viktoria Bobeva (BUL)	8^{F}
Zhou Feng (CHN)	6
Blessing Oborududu (NGR)	4
Dalma Caneva (ITA)	6
Meerim Zhumanazarova (KGZ)	5

Quarterfinals
Alla Cherkasova (UKR)	4^{F}
Viktoria Bobeva (BUL)	0
Zhou Feng (CHN)	12
Dalma Caneva (ITA)	1

Semifinals
Alla Cherkasova (UKR)	12
Zhou Feng (CHN)	8

=== Bottom half ===
Round of 32
Navjot Kaur (IND)	4
Chen Wen-ling (TPE)	2
Koumba Larroque (FRA)	9^{F}
Jang Eun-sil (KOR)	0
Olivia Di Bacco (CAN)	5
Danutė Domikaitytė (LTU)	0
Yekaterina Larionova (KAZ)	4^{F}
Beste Altuğ (TUR)	2
Jenny Fransson (SWE)	7
Rio Watari (JPN)	5
Anta Sambou (SEN)	0
Soronzonboldyn Battsetseg (MGL)	6^{F}
Anastasia Bratchikova (RUS)	2
Yudaris Sánchez (CUB)	5

Round of 16
Navjot Kaur (IND)	0
Koumba Larroque (FRA)	4^{F}
Olivia Di Bacco (CAN)	11
Yekaterina Larionova (KAZ)	0
Jenny Fransson (SWE)	2
Soronzonboldyn Battsetseg (MGL)	5
Yudaris Sánchez (CUB)	0
Tamyra Mensah-Stock (USA)	10

Quarterfinals
Koumba Larroque (FRA)	11
Olivia Di Bacco (CAN)	3
Soronzonboldyn Battsetseg (MGL)	0
Tamyra Mensah-Stock (USA)	10

Semifinals
Koumba Larroque (FRA)	2
Tamyra Mensah-Stock (USA)	1

=== Repechage ===
Repechage round 1
Jang Eun-sil (KOR)	0
Navjot Kaur (IND)	10

Repechage round 2
Maryia Mamashuk (BLR)	3
Viktoria Bobeva (BUL)	0
Navjot Kaur (IND)	0
Olivia Di Bacco (CAN)	11

Bronze medals
Maryia Mamashuk (BLR)	1
Zhou Feng (CHN)	12
Olivia Di Bacco (CAN)	4
Tamyra Mensah-Stock (USA)	7
