= 2026 World Wrestling Championships – Women's freestyle 68 kg =

Wrestling competitions

Women's freestyle 68 kg at the 2026 World Championships
- Venue: Barys Arena
- Dates: 28–29 October 2026
- Competitors: 21 from 21 nations

Medalists
gold medal	Long Jia	China
silver medal	Meerim Zhumanazarova	Kyrgyzstan
bronze medal	Kennedy Blades	United States
bronze medal	Adéla Hanzlíčková	Czech Republic

The women's freestyle 68 kilograms is a competition featured at the 2026 World Wrestling Championships, and was held in Astana, Kazakhstan on 28 and 29 October 2026.

This freestyle wrestling competition consists of a single-elimination tournament, with a repechage used to determine the winner of two bronze medals. The two finalists face off for gold and silver medals. Each wrestler who loses to one of the two finalists moves into the repechage, culminating in a pair of bronze medal matches, featuring the semifinal losers each facing the remaining repechage opponent from their half of the bracket.

== Results ==
Legend

- F — Won by fall

=== Final ===
Final
Meerim Zhumanazarova (KGZ)	3
Long Jia (CHN)	4

=== Top half ===
Round of 32
Nathaly Grimán (VEN)	8
Enkhsaikhany Delgermaa (MGL)	6^{F}
Faith Wamalwa (KEN)	0
Laura Köhler (GER)	11
Firuza Esenbaeva (UZB)	0
Srishti Janghu (IND)	8

Round of 16
Ami Ishii (JPN)	6
Elizaveta Petliakova (RUS)	8^{F}
Enkhsaikhany Delgermaa (MGL)	7
Tindra Sjöberg (SWE)	0
Kennedy Blades (USA)	8^{F}
Laura Köhler (GER)	0
Srishti Janghu (IND)	1
Meerim Zhumanazarova (KGZ)	5

Quarterfinals
Elizaveta Petliakova (RUS)	2
Enkhsaikhany Delgermaa (MGL)	3
Kennedy Blades (USA)	3
Meerim Zhumanazarova (KGZ)	6^{F}

Semifinals
Enkhsaikhany Delgermaa (MGL)	1
Meerim Zhumanazarova (KGZ)	5

=== Bottom half ===
Round of 32
Adéla Hanzlíčková (CZE)	6^{F}
Ella Doornaert (CAN)	0
Joseth Mavungu (ANG)	4
Irina Kazyulina (KAZ)	8

Round of 16
Nesrin Baş (TUR)	8
Mercy Adekuoroye (NGR)	2
Adéla Hanzlíčková (CZE)	4^{F}
Noémi Szabados (HUN)	1
Manola Skobelska (UKR)	6^{F}
Irina Kazyulina (KAZ)	0
María Ceballos (COL)	0
Long Jia (CHN)	10

Quarterfinals
Nesrin Baş (TUR)	8
Adéla Hanzlíčková (CZE)	11^{F}
Manola Skobelska (UKR)	0
Long Jia (CHN)	10

Semifinals
Adéla Hanzlíčková (CZE)	2
Long Jia (CHN)	7

=== Repechage ===
Repechage round 2
Srishti Janghu (IND)	1
Kennedy Blades (USA)	12
María Ceballos (COL)	0
Manola Skobelska (UKR)	4

Bronze medals
Kennedy Blades (USA)	10^{F}
Enkhsaikhany Delgermaa (MGL)	3
Manola Skobelska (UKR)	6
Adéla Hanzlíčková (CZE)	6

== Final standing ==
Rank	Athlete
1st place, gold medalist(s)	Long Jia (CHN)
2nd place, silver medalist(s)	Meerim Zhumanazarova (KGZ)
3rd place, bronze medalist(s)	Kennedy Blades (USA)
3rd place, bronze medalist(s)	Adéla Hanzlíčková (CZE)
5	Enkhsaikhany Delgermaa (MGL)
5	Manola Skobelska (UKR)
7	Elizaveta Petliakova (RUS)
8	Srishti Janghu (IND)
9	Laura Köhler (GER)
10	Nesrin Baş (TUR)
11	Irina Kazyulina (KAZ)
12	Joseth Mavungu (ANG)
13	Mercy Adekuoroye (NGR)
14	Nathaly Grimán (VEN)
15	Ami Ishii (JPN)
16	Noémi Szabados (HUN)
17	Ella Doornaert (CAN)
18	Tindra Sjöberg (SWE)
19	Firuza Esenbaeva (UZB)
20	Faith Wamalwa (KEN)
21	María Ceballos (COL)
