= 2017 European Wrestling Championships – Women's freestyle 69 kg =

The women's freestyle 69 kg is a competition featured at the 2017 European Wrestling Championships, and was held in Novi Sad, Serbia on May 5.

== Medalists ==
Gold	Anastasia Bratchikova (RUS)
Silver	Maryia Mamashuk (BLR)
Bronze	Alla Cherkasova (UKR)
Bronze	Koumba Larroque (FRA)

== Results ==
Legend

- F — Won by fall

=== Top half ===
==== Section 1 ====
Qualification
Aline Focken (GER)	2
Alla Cherkasova (UKR)	2^{F}
Signe Marie Store (NOR)	6^{F}
Alexandra Sandahl (SWE)	1
Buse Tosun (TUR)	8
Maryia Mamashuk (BLR)	14
Sofiya Georgieva (BUL)	5
Danutė Domikaitytė (LTU)	1
Koumba Larroque (FRA)	1
Anastasia Bratchikova (RUS)	3
Agoro Papavasileiou (GRE)	3
Elis Manolova (AZE)	6
Ilana Kratysh (ISR)	4^{F}
Vanessa Wilson (HUN)	0

Quarterfinals
Martina Kuenz (AUT)	8
Alla Cherkasova (UKR)	10
Signe Marie Store (NOR)	0
Maryia Mamashuk (BLR)	10
Sofiya Georgieva (BUL)	0
Anastasia Bratchikova (RUS)	5^{F}
Elis Manolova (AZE)	3
Ilana Kratysh (ISR)	0

Semifinals
Alla Cherkasova (UKR)	0
Maryia Mamashuk (BLR)	2
Anastasia Bratchikova (RUS)	10
Elis Manolova (AZE)	0

Final
Maryia Mamashuk (BLR)	3
Anastasia Bratchikova (RUS)	6

=== Repechage ===
Repechage round 2
Buse Tosun (TUR)	10
Signe Marie Store (NOR)	4
Koumba Larroque (FRA)	8
Sofiya Georgieva (BUL)	0

Bronze medals
Buse Tosun (TUR)	4
Alla Cherkasova (UKR)	11
Koumba Larroque (FRA)	7
Elis Manolova (AZE)	0
