= 2020 Individual Wrestling World Cup – Women's freestyle 68 kg =

The Women's freestyle 68 kg is a competition featured at the 2020 Individual Wrestling World Cup, and was held in Belgrade, Serbia on 15 and 16 December 2020.

== Medalists ==
| Gold | Meerim Zhumanazarova; Kyrgyzstan |
| Silver | Adéla Hanzlíčková; Czech Republic |
| Bronze | Alina Berezhna; Ukraine |
| Bronze | Khanum Velieva; Russia |

== Results ==
Legend

- F — Won by fall

1/8 finals
Dalma Caneva (ITA) | 3
Sofiya Georgieva (BUL) | 6

Quarterfinals
Alina Berezhna (UKR) | 6^{F}
Nesrin Baş (TUR) | 0
Hanna Sadchanka (BLR) | 1
Meerim Zhumanazarova (KGZ) | 4^{F}
Khanum Velieva (RUS) | 4
Koumba Larroque (FRA) | 3
Adéla Hanzlíčková (CZE) | 9
Sofiya Georgieva (BUL) | 0

Semifinals
Alina Berezhna (UKR) | 6
Meerim Zhumanazarova (KGZ) | 6
Khanum Velieva (RUS) | 4
Adéla Hanzlíčková (CZE) | 2^{F}

Final
Meerim Zhumanazarova (KGZ) | 8
Adéla Hanzlíčková (CZE) | 2

Bronze medals
Hanna Sadchanka (BLR) | 0
Alina Berezhna (UKR) | 10
Sofiya Georgieva (BUL) | 2
Khanum Velieva (RUS) | 13
