= 2018 European Wrestling Championships – Women's freestyle 68 kg =

The women's freestyle 68 kg is a competition featured at the 2018 European Wrestling Championships, and was held in Kaspiysk, Russia on May 2 and May 3.

== Medalists ==
Gold	Anastasia Bratchikova; Russia
Silver	Koumba Larroque; France
Bronze	Buse Tosun; Turkey
Bronze	Martina Kuenz; Austria

== Results ==
Legend

- F — Won by fall

=== Main Bracket ===
1/8 finals
Buse Tosun (TUR)	8
Irina Netreba (AZE)	5
Hanna Sadchanka (BLR)	0
Martina Kuenz (AUT)	4
Yelyzaveta Tiskarova (UKR)	0
Laura Skujiņa (LAT)	3^{F}
Anastasia Bratchikova (RUS)	7
Sofiya Georgieva (BUL)	0
Danutė Domikaitytė (LTU)	6^{F}
Ilana Kratysh (ISR)	0

Quarterfinals
Koumba Larroque (FRA)	4
Monika Michalik (POL)	0
Dalma Caneva (ITA)	4
Buse Tosun (TUR)	7
Martina Kuenz (AUT)	4
Laura Skujiņa (LAT)	4
Anastasia Bratchikova (RUS)	3
Danutė Domikaitytė (LTU)	2

Semifinals
Koumba Larroque (FRA)	4
Buse Tosun (TUR)	3
Martina Kuenz (AUT)	1
Anastasia Bratchikova (RUS)	8

Final
Koumba Larroque (FRA)	1
Anastasia Bratchikova (RUS)	3

=== Repechage ===
Repechage round 1
Sofiya Georgieva (BUL)	1
Danutė Domikaitytė (LTU)	2

Bronze medal match
Monika Michalik (POL)	4
Buse Tosun (TUR)	6
Danutė Domikaitytė (LTU)	1
Martina Kuenz (AUT)	2
