= Wrestling at the 2019 European Games – Women's freestyle 68 kg =

Women's freestyle 68 kg at the 2019 European Games
- Venue: Minsk Sports Palace
- Date: 26 June and 27 June
- Competitors: 14 from 14 nations

Medalists
gold medal	Anastasija Grigorjeva	Latvia
silver medal	Anastasia Bratchikova	Russia
bronze medal	Sofiya Georgieva	Bulgaria
bronze medal	Alla Cherkasova	Ukraine

The women's freestyle 68 kilograms wrestling competition at the 2019 European Games in Minsk was held on 26 to 27 June 2019 at the Minsk Sports Palace.

== Schedule ==
All times are in FET (UTC+03:00)

Date	Time	Event
Wednesday, 26 June 2019	12:40	1/8 finals
Wednesday, 26 June 2019	13:50	Quarterfinals
Wednesday, 26 June 2019	18:30	Semifinals
Thursday, 27 June 2019	11:20	Repechage
Thursday, 27 June 2019	20:00	Finals

== Results ==
Legend

- F — Won by fall

=== Main bracket ===
1/8 finals
Nadine Weinauge (GER)	0
Alexandra Anghel (ROU)	5
Anastasija Grigorjeva (LAT)	4^{F}
Sofiya Georgieva (BUL)	1
Alla Cherkasova (UKR)	10
Sara Da Col (ITA)	0
Adéla Hanzlíčková (CZE)	2
Agnieszka Wieszczek (POL)	5
Anastasia Bratchikova (RUS)	4
Buse Tosun (TUR)	2
Irina Netreba (AZE)	1
Jenny Fransson (SWE)	3

Quarterfinals
Maryia Mamashuk (BLR)	2
Danutė Domikaitytė (LTU)	2
Alexandra Anghel (ROU)	3
Anastasija Grigorjeva (LAT)	10
Alla Cherkasova (UKR)	12
Agnieszka Wieszczek (POL)	2
Anastasia Bratchikova (RUS)	2
Jenny Fransson (SWE)	2

Semifinals
Danutė Domikaitytė (LTU)	3
Anastasija Grigorjeva (LAT)	10
Alla Cherkasova (UKR)	2
Anastasia Bratchikova (RUS)	4

Final
Anastasija Grigorjeva (LAT)	5
Anastasia Bratchikova (RUS)	3

=== Repechage ===
Repechage round 1
Sofiya Georgieva (BUL)	2
Alexandra Anghel (ROU)	1
Buse Tosun (TUR)	3
Jenny Fransson (SWE)	5^{F}

Bronze medals
Sofiya Georgieva (BUL)	4
Danutė Domikaitytė (LTU)	1
Jenny Fransson (SWE)	2
Alla Cherkasova (UKR)	6
