= 2020 European Wrestling Championships – Women's freestyle 68 kg =

Competition at the 2020 European Wrestling Championships

The women's freestyle 68 kg is a competition featured at the 2020 European Wrestling Championships, and was held in Rome, Italy on February 12 and February 13.

== Medalists ==
Gold	Khanum Velieva; Russia
Silver	Dalma Caneva; Italy
Bronze	Danutė Domikaitytė; Lithuania
Bronze	Alla Cherkasova; Ukraine

== Results ==
Legend

- F — Won by fall

1/8 finals
Danutė Domikaitytė (LTU)	6
Kadriye Aksoy (TUR)	4
Alla Cherkasova (UKR)	5
Irina Netreba (AZE)	4
Koumba Larroque (FRA)	10
Ilana Kratysh (ISR)	0
Agnieszka Wieszczek (POL)	1
Hanna Sadchanka (BLR)	4
Khanum Velieva (RUS)	10
Sofiya Georgieva (BUL)	0

Quarterfinals
Adéla Hanzlíčková (CZE)	4
Anna Schell (GER)	10
Dalma Caneva (ITA)	2
Danutė Domikaitytė (LTU)	0
Alla Cherkasova (UKR)	6
Koumba Larroque (FRA)	2
Hanna Sadchanka (BLR)	3
Khanum Velieva (RUS)	5

Semifinals
Anna Schell (GER)	2
Dalma Caneva (ITA)	4
Alla Cherkasova (UKR)	1
Khanum Velieva (RUS)	11

Final
Dalma Caneva (ITA)	0
Khanum Velieva (RUS)	11

Repechage round 1
Sofiya Georgieva (BUL)	0
Hanna Sadchanka (BLR)	10

Bronze medal match
Danutė Domikaitytė (LTU)	9
Anna Schell (GER)	0
Hanna Sadchanka (BLR)	2
Alla Cherkasova (UKR)	4^{F}

== Final standing ==
Rank	Athlete
1st place, gold medalist(s)	Khanum Velieva (RUS)
2nd place, silver medalist(s)	Dalma Caneva (ITA)
3rd place, bronze medalist(s)	Danutė Domikaitytė (LTU)
3rd place, bronze medalist(s)	Alla Cherkasova (UKR)
5	Anna Schell (GER)
5	Hanna Sadchanka (BLR)
7	Koumba Larroque (FRA)
8	Irina Netreba (AZE)
9	Kadriye Aksoy (TUR)
10	Adéla Hanzlíčková (CZE)
11	Agnieszka Wieszczek (POL)
12	Ilana Kratysh (ISR)
13	Sofiya Georgieva (BUL)
