= 2022 World Wrestling Championships – Women's freestyle 68 kg =

Wrestling competitions

Women's freestyle 68 kg at the 2022 World Championships
- Venue: Štark Arena
- Dates: 14–15 September 2022
- Competitors: 23 from 23 nations

Medalists
gold medal	Tamyra Mensah-Stock	United States
silver medal	Ami Ishii	Japan
bronze medal	Linda Morais	Canada
bronze medal	Irina Rîngaci	Moldova

The women's freestyle 68 kilograms is a competition featured at the 2022 World Wrestling Championships, and was held in Belgrade, Serbia on 14 and 15 September 2022.

This freestyle wrestling competition consists of a single-elimination tournament, with a repechage used to determine the winner of two bronze medals. The two finalists face off for gold and silver medals. Each wrestler who loses to one of the two finalists moves into the repechage, culminating in a pair of bronze medal matches featuring the semifinal losers each facing the remaining repechage opponent from their half of the bracket.

== Results ==
Legend

- F — Won by fall

=== Final ===
Final
Ami Ishii (JPN)	0
Tamyra Mensah-Stock (USA)	6^{F}

=== Top half ===
Round of 32
Ami Ishii (JPN)	10
Gabriela Rocha (BRA)	0
Sofiya Georgieva (BUL)	7
Lại Diệu Thương (VIE)	0
Nisha Dahiya (IND)	11
Danutė Domikaitytė (LTU)	0

Round of 16
Meerim Zhumanazarova (KGZ)	5
Linda Morais (CAN)	6
Ami Ishii (JPN)	3
Pauline Lecarpentier (FRA)	0
Natalia Strzałka (POL)	0
Sofiya Georgieva (BUL)	11
Nisha Dahiya (IND)	13
Adéla Hanzlíčková (CZE)	8

Quarterfinals
Linda Morais (CAN)	8
Ami Ishii (JPN)	5^{F}
Sofiya Georgieva (BUL)	0
Nisha Dahiya (IND)	11

Semifinals
Ami Ishii (JPN)	5
Nisha Dahiya (IND)	4

=== Bottom half ===
Round of 32
Enkhsaikhany Delgermaa (MGL)	6
Nesrin Baş (TUR)	1
Noémi Szabados (HUN)	4
Dalma Caneva (ITA)	2
Ámbar Garnica (MEX)	4^{F}
Park Su-jin (KOR)	0
Alla Belinska (UKR)	5
Madina Bakbergenova (KAZ)	2

Round of 16
Blessing Oborududu (NGR)	2
Enkhsaikhany Delgermaa (MGL)	2
Noémi Szabados (HUN)	0
Irina Rîngaci (MDA)	10
Zhou Feng (CHN)	10
Ámbar Garnica (MEX)	4
Alla Belinska (UKR)	0
Tamyra Mensah-Stock (USA)	10^{F}

Quarterfinals
Enkhsaikhany Delgermaa (MGL)	4
Irina Rîngaci (MDA)	14
Zhou Feng (CHN)	0
Tamyra Mensah-Stock (USA)	10

Semifinals
Irina Rîngaci (MDA)	0
Tamyra Mensah-Stock (USA)	10

=== Repechage ===
Repechage round 1
Gabriela Rocha (BRA)	1
Pauline Lecarpentier (FRA)	5

Repechage round 2
Pauline Lecarpentier (FRA)	1
Linda Morais (CAN)	2
Alla Belinska (UKR)	0
Zhou Feng (CHN)	10

Bronze medals
Linda Morais (CAN)	4^{F}
Nisha Dahiya (IND)	4
Zhou Feng (CHN)	0
Irina Rîngaci (MDA)	4^{F}

== Final standing ==
Rank	Athlete
1st place, gold medalist(s)	Tamyra Mensah-Stock (USA)
2nd place, silver medalist(s)	Ami Ishii (JPN)
3rd place, bronze medalist(s)	Linda Morais (CAN)
3rd place, bronze medalist(s)	Irina Rîngaci (MDA)
5	Nisha Dahiya (IND)
5	Zhou Feng (CHN)
7	Sofiya Georgieva (BUL)
8	Enkhsaikhany Delgermaa (MGL)
9	Ámbar Garnica (MEX)
10	Pauline Lecarpentier (FRA)
11	Alla Belinska (UKR)
12	Noémi Szabados (HUN)
13	Adéla Hanzlíčková (CZE)
14	Meerim Zhumanazarova (KGZ)
15	Blessing Oborududu (NGR)
16	Dalma Caneva (ITA)
17	Madina Bakbergenova (KAZ)
18	Nesrin Baş (TUR)
19	Gabriela Rocha (BRA)
20	Park Su-jin (KOR)
21	Lại Diệu Thương (VIE)
22	Natalia Strzałka (POL)
23	Danutė Domikaitytė (LTU)
