= Bratchikov =

Bratchikov, feminine: Bratchikova

- Aleksandr Bratchikov (born 1947), Soviet sprinter
- Anastasia Bratchikova, Russian female freestyle wrestler
- Nina Bratchikova, Russian professional tennis player
