= 2021 European Wrestling Championships – Women's freestyle 68 kg =

Wrestling competition

The women's freestyle 68 kg is a competition featured at the 2021 European Wrestling Championships, and was held in Warsaw, Poland on April 21 and April 22.

== Medalists ==
Gold	Koumba Larroque; France
Silver	Khanum Velieva; Russia
Bronze	Adéla Hanzlíčková; Czech Republic
Bronze	Alina Berezhna; Ukraine

== Results ==
Legend

- F — Won by fall
- WO — Won by walkover

1/8 finals
~~Mimi Hristova (BUL)~~
Alina Berezhna (UKR)	WO
Khanum Velieva (RUS)	7
Hanna Sadchanka (BLR)	0
Tindra Sjöberg (SWE)	2
Elis Manolova (AZE)	10
Nesrin Baş (TUR)	2
Wiktoria Chołuj (POL)	2

Quarterfinals
Ilana Kratysh (ISR)	0
Koumba Larroque (FRA)	4^{F}
Adéla Hanzlíčková (CZE)	4^{F}
Danutė Domikaitytė (LTU)	0
Alina Berezhna (UKR)	3
Khanum Velieva (RUS)	6
Elis Manolova (AZE)	3
Nesrin Baş (TUR)	7^{F}

Semifinals
Koumba Larroque (FRA)	11
Adéla Hanzlíčková (CZE)	0
Khanum Velieva (RUS)	8
Nesrin Baş (TUR)	4

Final
Koumba Larroque (FRA)	3
Khanum Velieva (RUS)	2

Repechage round 1
Hanna Sadchanka (BLR)	0
Alina Berezhna (UKR)	6^{F}

Bronze medal match
Ilana Kratysh (ISR)	0
Adéla Hanzlíčková (CZE)	10
Alina Berezhna (UKR)	5^{F}
Nesrin Baş (TUR)	0

== Final standing ==
Rank	Athlete
1st place, gold medalist(s)	Koumba Larroque (FRA)
2nd place, silver medalist(s)	Khanum Velieva (RUS)
3rd place, bronze medalist(s)	Adéla Hanzlíčková (CZE)
3rd place, bronze medalist(s)	Alina Berezhna (UKR)
5	Ilana Kratysh (ISR)
5	Nesrin Baş (TUR)
7	Elis Manolova (AZE)
8	Wiktoria Chołuj (POL)
9	Tindra Sjöberg (SWE)
10	Danutė Domikaitytė (LTU)
11	Hanna Sadchanka (BLR)
—	Mimi Hristova (BUL)
