= Wrestling at the 2026 Asian Games =

- Venue: Inae Sports Center
- Dates: 30 September – 3 October 2026
- Competitors: 238 from 32 nations

Wrestling at the 2026 Asian Games was held between 30 September and 3 October 2026 at Inae Sports Center. The men wrestled against each other in both freestyle and Greco-Roman events, whereas the women only participated in the freestyle wrestling, with 18 gold medals awarded.

== Schedule ==
P	Preliminary rounds & Repechage	F	Finals

Event↓/Date →	30th Wed		1st Thu		2nd Fri		3rd Sat	
Men's freestyle 57 kg							P	F
Men's freestyle 65 kg					P	F		
Men's freestyle 74 kg							P	F
Men's freestyle 86 kg					P	F		
Men's freestyle 97 kg							P	F
Men's freestyle 125 kg					P	F		
Men's Greco-Roman 60 kg			P	F				
Men's Greco-Roman 67 kg	P	F						
Men's Greco-Roman 77 kg			P	F				
Men's Greco-Roman 87 kg	P	F						
Men's Greco-Roman 97 kg			P	F				
Men's Greco-Roman 130 kg	P	F						
Women's freestyle 50 kg					P	F		
Women's freestyle 53 kg							P	F
Women's freestyle 57 kg							P	F
Women's freestyle 62 kg			P	F				
Women's freestyle 68 kg	P	F						
Women's freestyle 76 kg					P	F		

== Medal summary ==
=== Medal table ===
* Host nation (Japan)

Rank	Nation	Gold	Silver	Bronze	Total
1	Japan*	7	4	4	15
2	Iran	6	0	1	7
3	India	2	2	2	6
4	Uzbekistan	1	3	1	5
5	China	1	1	7	9
6	Kyrgyzstan	1	1	5	7
7	North Korea	0	5	0	5
8	Kazakhstan	0	1	6	7
9	Tajikistan	0	1	2	3
10	Mongolia	0	0	4	4
11	Bahrain	0	0	1	1
11	Iraq	0	0	1	1
11	Qatar	0	0	1	1
11	South Korea	0	0	1	1
Totals (14 entries)		18	18	36	72

=== Medalists ===
==== Men's freestyle ====
Event	Gold	Silver	Bronze
57 kg	Aman Sehrawat; India	Han Chong-song; North Korea	Zou Wanhao; China
57 kg	Aman Sehrawat; India	Han Chong-song; North Korea	Aiaal Belolyubskii; Tajikistan
65 kg	Sujeet Kalkal; India	Abdulmazhid Kudiev; Tajikistan	Kotaro Kiyooka; Japan
65 kg	Sujeet Kalkal; India	Abdulmazhid Kudiev; Tajikistan	Nachyn Kuular; Kazakhstan
74 kg	Younes Emami; Iran	Yoshinosuke Aoyagi; Japan	Viktor Rassadin; Tajikistan
74 kg	Younes Emami; Iran	Yoshinosuke Aoyagi; Japan	Nurkozha Kaipanov; Kazakhstan
86 kg	Mohammad Nokhodi; Iran	Hayato Ishiguro; Japan	Malik Shavaev; Kyrgyzstan
86 kg	Mohammad Nokhodi; Iran	Hayato Ishiguro; Japan	Olonbayaryn Süldkhüü; Mongolia
97 kg	Amir Ali Azarpira; Iran	Sherzod Poyonov; Uzbekistan	Deepak Punia; India
97 kg	Amir Ali Azarpira; Iran	Sherzod Poyonov; Uzbekistan	Arash Yoshida; Japan
125 kg	Amir Hossein Zare; Iran	Buheeerdun; China	Shamil Sharipov; Bahrain
125 kg	Amir Hossein Zare; Iran	Buheeerdun; China	Yedige Kassimbek; Kazakhstan

==== Men's Greco-Roman ====
Event	Gold	Silver	Bronze
60 kg	Zholaman Sharshenbekov; Kyrgyzstan	Alisher Ganiev; Uzbekistan	Sajjad Ali; Iraq
60 kg	Zholaman Sharshenbekov; Kyrgyzstan	Alisher Ganiev; Uzbekistan	Ayata Suzuki; Japan
67 kg	Aytjan Khalmakhanov; Uzbekistan	Kyotaro Sogabe; Japan	Razzak Beishekeev; Kyrgyzstan
67 kg	Aytjan Khalmakhanov; Uzbekistan	Kyotaro Sogabe; Japan	Meirzhan Shermakhanbet; Kazakhstan
77 kg	Alireza Abdevali; Iran	Nao Kusaka; Japan	Akzhol Makhmudov; Kyrgyzstan
77 kg	Alireza Abdevali; Iran	Nao Kusaka; Japan	Shahin Badaghi; Qatar
87 kg	Taizo Yoshida; Japan	Asan Zhanyshov; Kyrgyzstan	Jalgasbay Berdimuratov; Uzbekistan
87 kg	Taizo Yoshida; Japan	Asan Zhanyshov; Kyrgyzstan	Sunil Kumar; India
97 kg	Yuri Nakazato; Japan	Nitesh Siwach; India	Ganbaataryn Gankhuyag; Mongolia
97 kg	Yuri Nakazato; Japan	Nitesh Siwach; India	Mehdi Bali; Iran
130 kg	Amin Mirzazadeh; Iran	Rafael Tsitsuashvili; Uzbekistan	Meng Lingzhe; China
130 kg	Amin Mirzazadeh; Iran	Rafael Tsitsuashvili; Uzbekistan	Kim Min-seok; South Korea

==== Women's freestyle ====
Event	Gold	Silver	Bronze
50 kg	Yui Susaki; Japan	Kim Son-hyang; North Korea	Feng Ziqi; China
50 kg	Yui Susaki; Japan	Kim Son-hyang; North Korea	Zeinep Bayanova; Kazakhstan
53 kg	Moe Kiyooka; Japan	Antim Panghal; India	Zhang Jin; China
53 kg	Moe Kiyooka; Japan	Antim Panghal; India	Bayanmönkhiin Otgontuyaa; Mongolia
57 kg	Hong Kexin; China	Son Il-sim; North Korea	Nilufar Raimova; Kazakhstan
57 kg	Hong Kexin; China	Son Il-sim; North Korea	Akari Fujinami; Japan
62 kg	Nonoka Ozaki; Japan	Kim Ok-ju; North Korea	Togtokhyn Altjin; Mongolia
62 kg	Nonoka Ozaki; Japan	Kim Ok-ju; North Korea	Zhang Qi; China
68 kg	Ami Ishii; Japan	Pak Sol-gum; North Korea	Meerim Zhumanazarova; Kyrgyzstan
68 kg	Ami Ishii; Japan	Pak Sol-gum; North Korea	Long Jia; China
76 kg	Yuka Kagami; Japan	Elmira Syzdykova; Kazakhstan	Aiperi Medet Kyzy; Kyrgyzstan
76 kg	Yuka Kagami; Japan	Elmira Syzdykova; Kazakhstan	Li Wenji; China

== Participating nations ==
A total of 238 athletes from 32 nations competed in wrestling at the 2026 Asian Games:

- Afghanistan (2)
- Bahrain (5)
- Bangladesh (2)
- Cambodia (5)
- China (18)
- Chinese Taipei (4)
- Hong Kong (2)
- India (15)
- Indonesia (5)
- Iran (12)
- Iraq (2)
- Japan (18)
- Kazakhstan (18)
- Kyrgyzstan (14)
- Lebanon (1)
- Mongolia (15)
- Nepal (6)
- North Korea (8)
- Pakistan (4)
- Palestine (1)
- Philippines (7)
- Qatar (2)
- Saudi Arabia (3)
- South Korea (18)
- Sri Lanka (5)
- Syria (1)
- Tajikistan (9)
- Thailand (4)
- Timor-Leste (1)
- Turkmenistan (6)
- Uzbekistan (18)
- Vietnam (7)
