= 2021 World Wrestling Championships – Women's freestyle 68 kg =

Wrestling competitions

Women's freestyle 68 kg at the 2021 World Championships
- Venue: Nye Jordal Amfi
- Dates: 6–7 October 2021
- Competitors: 15 from 15 nations

Medalists
gold medal	Meerim Zhumanazarova	Kyrgyzstan
silver medal	Rin Miyaji	Japan
bronze medal	Tamyra Mensah-Stock	United States
bronze medal	Khanum Velieva	RWF

The women's freestyle 68 kilograms is a competition featured at the 2021 World Wrestling Championships, and was held in Oslo, Norway on 6 and 7 October.

This freestyle wrestling competition consists of a single-elimination tournament, with a repechage used to determine the winner of two bronze medals. The two finalists face off for gold and silver medals. Each wrestler who loses to one of the two finalists moves into the repechage, culminating in a pair of bronze medal matches featuring the semifinal losers each facing the remaining repechage opponent from their half of the bracket.

Each bout consists of a single round within a six-minute limit including two halves of three minutes. The wrestler who scores more points is the winner.

Meerim Zhumanazarova from Kyrgyzstan won the gold medal after pinning Rin Miyaji of Japan in the final, Zhumanazarova scored four points before beating her opponent by fall in the 3rd minute of the final. World and Olympic Champion Tamyra Mensah-Stock won the bronze medal after a surprise defeat by fall in the semifinal, the other bronze medal went to Khanum Velieva from the Russian Wrestling Federation.

== Results ==
Legend

- F — Won by fall

=== Main bracket ===
Round of 16
Ritu Malik (IND)	0
Anastasiia Lavrenchuk (UKR)	4^{F}
Ámbar Garnica (MEX)	5
Danutė Domikaitytė (LTU)	8
Rin Miyaji (JPN)	12
Adéla Hanzlíčková (CZE)	5
Khanum Velieva (RWF)	2
Natalia Strzałka (POL)	0
Enkhsaikhany Delgermaa (MGL)	0
Blessing Oborududu (NGR)	10
Nesrin Baş (TUR)	0
Olivia Di Bacco (CAN)	10
Ha Min-ji (KOR)	0
Meerim Zhumanazarova (KGZ)	8^{F}

Quarterfinals
Tamyra Mensah-Stock (USA)	8
Anastasiia Lavrenchuk (UKR)	0
Danutė Domikaitytė (LTU)	0
Rin Miyaji (JPN)	10
Khanum Velieva (RWF)	8
Blessing Oborududu (NGR)	7
Olivia Di Bacco (CAN)	1
Meerim Zhumanazarova (KGZ)	7

Semifinals
Tamyra Mensah-Stock (USA)	0
Rin Miyaji (JPN)	2^{F}
Khanum Velieva (RWF)	3
Meerim Zhumanazarova (KGZ)	3

Final
Rin Miyaji (JPN)	0
Meerim Zhumanazarova (KGZ)	4^{F}

=== Repechage ===
Repechage round 1
Adéla Hanzlíčková (CZE)	2
Danutė Domikaitytė (LTU)	1
Ha Min-ji (KOR)	0
Olivia Di Bacco (CAN)	10

Bronze medals
Adéla Hanzlíčková (CZE)	1
Tamyra Mensah-Stock (USA)	10
Olivia Di Bacco (CAN)	1
Khanum Velieva (RWF)	2

== Final standing ==
Rank	Athlete
1st place, gold medalist(s)	Meerim Zhumanazarova (KGZ)
2nd place, silver medalist(s)	Rin Miyaji (JPN)
3rd place, bronze medalist(s)	Tamyra Mensah-Stock (USA)
3rd place, bronze medalist(s)	Khanum Velieva (RWF)
5	Adéla Hanzlíčková (CZE)
5	Olivia Di Bacco (CAN)
7	Anastasiia Lavrenchuk (UKR)
8	Blessing Oborududu (NGR)
9	Danutė Domikaitytė (LTU)
10	Ámbar Garnica (MEX)
11	Natalia Strzałka (POL)
12	Ritu Malik (IND)
13	Enkhsaikhany Delgermaa (MGL)
14	Nesrin Baş (TUR)
15	Ha Min-ji (KOR)
