= Koumba Larroque =

French freestyle wrestler

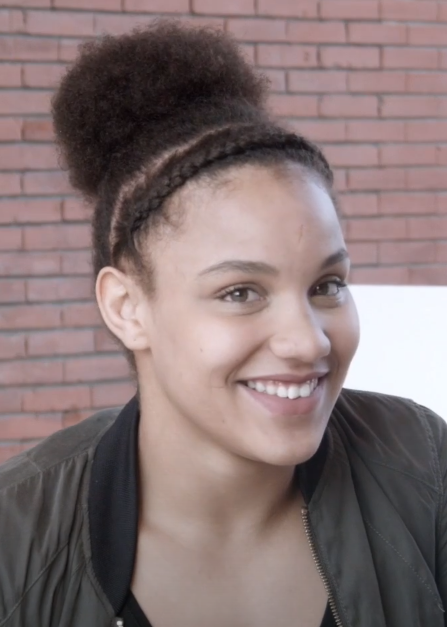
- Larroque in 2017

Personal information
- Full name: Koumba Selene Fanta Larroque
- Born: 22 August 1998 (age 28) Arpajon, France

Sport
- Country: France
- Sport: Amateur wrestling
- Weight class: 65 kg; 68 kg
- Event: Freestyle
Medal record
Women's freestyle wrestling
Representing France
Senior World Championships
Silver medal – second place	2018 Budapest	68 kg
Bronze medal – third place	2017 Paris	69 kg
Bronze medal – third place	2022 Belgrade	65 kg
Bronze medal – third place	2023 Belgrade	68 kg
Senior European Championships
Gold medal – first place	2021 Warsaw	68 kg
Silver medal – second place	2018 Kaspiysk	68 kg
Bronze medal – third place	2017 Novi Sad	69 kg
Bronze medal – third place	2023 Zagreb	68 kg
U23 World Championships
Gold medal – first place	2017 Bydgoszcz	69 kg
Gold medal – first place	2021 Belgrade	68 kg
U23 European Championships
Gold medal – first place	2017 Szombathely	69 kg
Gold medal – first place	2018 Istanbul	72 kg
Junior World Championships
Gold medal – first place	2016 Mâcon	67 kg
Gold medal – first place	2018 Trnava	72 kg
Junior European Championships
Gold medal – first place	2016 Bucharest	67 kg
Gold medal – first place	2017 Dortmund	72 kg
Cadet World Championships
Gold medal – first place	2015 Sarajevo	65 kg
Silver medal – second place	2014 Snina	60 kg
Cadet European Championships
Gold medal – first place	2015 Subotica	65 kg
Silver medal – second place	2014 Samokov	60 kg
World Military Championships
Gold medal – first place	2018 Moscow	72 kg
Summer Youth Olympics
Bronze medal – third place	2014 Nanjing	60 kg

Koumba Larroque (born 22 August 1998) is a French freestyle wrestler. She is a four-time medalist at the World Wrestling Championships and a four-time medalist, including gold, at the European Wrestling Championships. She represented France at the 2020 Summer Olympics in Tokyo, Japan and the 2024 Summer Olympics in Paris, France.

== Career ==
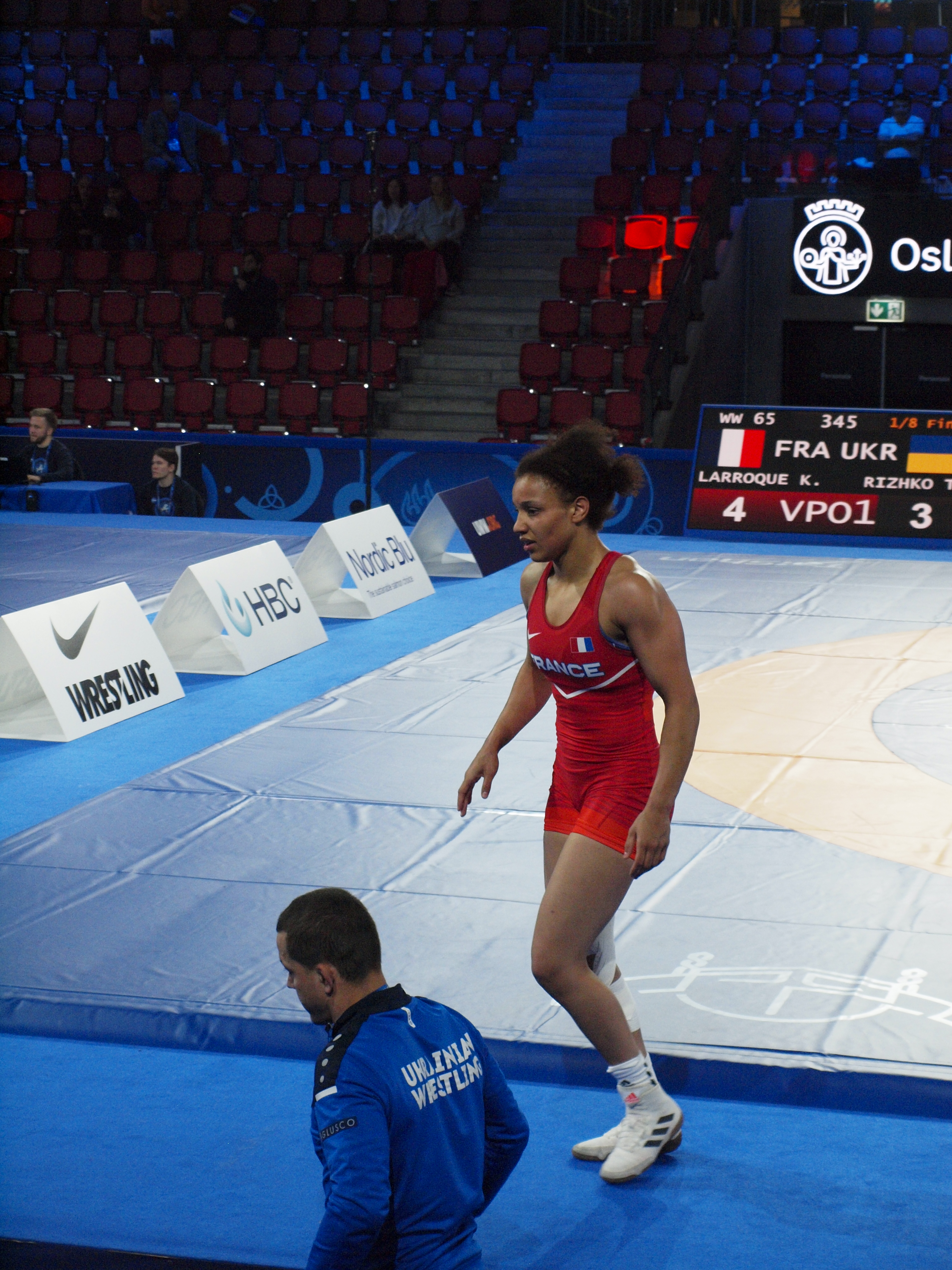
Koumba Larroque at the 2021 World Wrestling Championships in Oslo, Norway

At the 2014 Summer Youth Olympics held in Nanjing, China, Larroque won the bronze medal in the girls' 60 kg event. She won the gold medal in her event at both the 2016 European Juniors Wrestling Championships held in Bucharest, Romania and the 2016 World Junior Wrestling Championships held in Mâcon, France. She also competed at the first and second World Olympic Qualification tournaments hoping to qualify for the 2016 Summer Olympics in Rio de Janeiro, Brazil.

In 2017, Larroque won the gold medal in the 69 kg event at both the European U23 Wrestling Championship held in Szombathely, Hungary and the World U23 Wrestling Championship held in Bydgoszcz, Poland. She also won the gold medal in her event at the European Juniors Wrestling Championships held in Dortmund, Germany. In the same year, at the World Championships held in Paris, France, she won one of the bronze medals in the 69 kg event. She also won one of the bronze medals at the European Championships by defeating Elis Manolova of Azerbaijan in the 69 kg event.

Larroque competed at the 2018 European U23 Wrestling Championship held in Istanbul, Turkey where she won the gold medal in the women's 72 kg event. She won the silver medal in the 68 kg event at the 2018 World Wrestling Championships as well as the silver medal in the 68 kg event at the 2018 European Wrestling Championships held in Kaspiysk, Russia.

In 2019, Larroque competed in the 68 kg event at the World Championships without winning a medal; she lost her second match, against Jenny Fransson of Sweden, and she was then eliminated in the repechage. In 2020, she competed in the 68 kg event at the European Championships also without winning a medal; in this competition she won her first match against Ilana Kratysh of Israel but she was eliminated in her next match by Alla Cherkasova of Ukraine. Cherkasova went on to win one of the bronze medals. In the same year, she was eliminated in her first match in the women's 68 kg event at the 2020 Individual Wrestling World Cup held in Belgrade, Serbia.

In March 2021, Larroque qualified at the European Qualification Tournament to compete at the 2020 Summer Olympics in Tokyo, Japan. A month later, she won the gold medal in the 68 kg event at the European Wrestling Championships held in Warsaw, Poland. She defeated Khanum Velieva of Russia in the final. A few months later, she won the gold medal in her event at the 2021 Poland Open held in Warsaw, Poland.

Larroque competed in the women's 68 kg event at the 2020 Summer Olympics where she was eliminated in her first match by Soronzonboldyn Battsetseg of Mongolia. Two months after the Olympics, she competed in the women's 65 kg event at the 2021 World Wrestling Championships held in Oslo, Norway. She won her first two matches, against Elis Manolova of Azerbaijan and Tetiana Rizhko of Ukraine, and she was then eliminated in her next match by eventual bronze medalist Forrest Molinari of the United States.

At the 2021 U23 World Wrestling Championships held in Belgrade, Serbia, she won the gold medal in the 68 kg event. She won one of the bronze medals in the 65 kg event at the 2022 World Wrestling Championships held in Belgrade, Serbia. She defeated Elis Manolova of Azerbaijan in her bronze medal match.

Larroque won the gold medal in the women's 68 kg event at the Grand Prix de France Henri Deglane 2023 held in Nice, France. She also won the gold medal in her event at the 2023 Grand Prix Zagreb Open held in Zagreb, Croatia. She won the silver medal in her event at the 2023 Ibrahim Moustafa Tournament held in Alexandria, Egypt.

Larroque won one of the bronze medals in the women's 68 kg event at the 2023 European Wrestling Championships held in Zagreb, Croatia. She also won one of the bronze medals in the women's 68 kg event at the 2023 World Wrestling Championships held in Belgrade, Serbia. As a result, Larroque earned a quota place for France for the 2024 Summer Olympics in Paris, France. She defeated Emma Bruntil of the United States in her bronze medal match.

In 2024, Larroque competed in the women's 68 kg event at the European Wrestling Championships held in Bucharest, Romania. She won her first match and she was then eliminated by eventual bronze medalist Mimi Hristova of Bulgaria. At the 2024 Summer Olympics, she competed in the women's 68 kg event. She was eliminated in her second match by Blessing Oborududu of Nigeria.

== Personal life ==
She was born in Arpajon, France. Her mother is from Mali and her father is from France.

== Achievements ==
Year	Tournament	Location	Result	Event
2017	European Championships	Novi Sad, Serbia	3rd	Freestyle 69 kg
2017	World Championships	Paris, France	3rd	Freestyle 69 kg
2018	European Championships	Kaspiysk, Russia	2nd	Freestyle 68 kg
2018	World Championships	Budapest, Hungary	2nd	Freestyle 68 kg
2021	European Championships	Warsaw, Poland	1st	Freestyle 68 kg
2022	World Championships	Belgrade, Serbia	3rd	Freestyle 65 kg
2023	European Championships	Zagreb, Croatia	3rd	Freestyle 68 kg
2023	World Championships	Belgrade, Serbia	3rd	Freestyle 68 kg
