= 2023 World Wrestling Championships – Women's freestyle 68 kg =

Wrestling competitions

Women's freestyle 68 kg at the 2023 World Championships
- Venue: Štark Arena
- Dates: 20–21 September 2023
- Competitors: 33 from 30 nations

Medalists
gold medal	Buse Tosun Çavuşoğlu	Turkey
silver medal	Enkhsaikhany Delgermaa	Mongolia
bronze medal	Koumba Larroque	France
bronze medal	Irina Rîngaci	Moldova

The women's freestyle 68 kg is a competition featured at the 2023 World Wrestling Championships, and was held in Belgrade, Serbia on 20 and 21 September 2023.

This freestyle wrestling competition consists of a single-elimination tournament, with a repechage used to determine the winner of two bronze medals. The two finalists face off for gold and silver medals. Each wrestler who loses to one of the two finalists moves into the repechage, culminating in a pair of bronze medal matches featuring the semifinal losers each facing the remaining repechage opponent from their half of the bracket.

== Results ==
Legend

- F — Won by fall
- WO — Won by walkover

=== Finals ===
Semifinals		Final
Emma Bruntil (USA)	0
Enkhsaikhany Delgermaa (MGL)	6^{F}	Enkhsaikhany Delgermaa (MGL)	4
Buse Tosun Çavuşoğlu (TUR)	11	Buse Tosun Çavuşoğlu (TUR)	3^{F}
Ami Ishii (JPN)	1

=== Top half ===
==== Section 1 ====
Round of 64
Vusala Parfianovich (AIN)	11
Kwon Jeum-eun (KOR)	0

Round of 32
Zhou Feng (CHN)	5
Khadija Jlassi (TUN)	3
Emma Bruntil (USA)	2
Alexandra Anghel (ROU)	2
Vusala Parfianovich (AIN)	2
Danutė Domikaitytė (LTU)	0
Priyanka (UWW)	0
Blessing Oborududu (NGR)	11

Round of 16
Zhou Feng (CHN)	3
Emma Bruntil (USA)	6
Vusala Parfianovich (AIN)	3
Blessing Oborududu (NGR)	2

Quarterfinals
Emma Bruntil (USA)	2
Vusala Parfianovich (AIN)	1

==== Section 2 ====
Round of 64

Round of 32
Enkhsaikhany Delgermaa (MGL)	14
Emilija Jakovljević (SRB)	4
Olivia Di Bacco (CAN)	5
Yelena Shalygina (KAZ)	6
Nicoll Parrado (COL)	5^{F}
Firuza Esenbaeva (UZB)	0
Zsuzsanna Molnár (SVK)	0
Koumba Larroque (FRA)	10^{F}

Round of 16
Enkhsaikhany Delgermaa (MGL)	4^{F}
Yelena Shalygina (KAZ)	2
Nicoll Parrado (COL)	0
Koumba Larroque (FRA)	5

Quarterfinals
Enkhsaikhany Delgermaa (MGL)	2
Koumba Larroque (FRA)	1

=== Bottom half ===
==== Section 3 ====
Round of 64

Round of 32
Irina Rîngaci (MDA)	2
Buse Tosun Çavuşoğlu (TUR)	4^{F}
Alejandra Rivera (MEX)	4
Gabriela Rocha (BRA)	1
Wiktoria Chołuj (POL)	2
Noémi Szabados (HUN)	0
Tindra Sjöberg (SWE)	1
Adéla Hanzlíčková (CZE)	4^{F}

Round of 16
Buse Tosun Çavuşoğlu (TUR)	6^{F}
Alejandra Rivera (MEX)	0
Wiktoria Chołuj (POL)	3
Adéla Hanzlíčková (CZE)	4

Quarterfinals
Buse Tosun Çavuşoğlu (TUR)	8
Adéla Hanzlíčková (CZE)	0

==== Section 4 ====
Round of 64

Round of 32
Meerim Zhumanazarova (KGZ)	10
Yanet Sovero (PER)	0
Tetiana Rizhko (UKR)	2^{F}
Hanna Sadchanka (AIN)	0
Nerea Pampín (ESP)	0
Yuliana Yaneva (BUL)	10
Lại Diệu Thương (VIE)	0
Ami Ishii (JPN)	2^{F}

Round of 16
Meerim Zhumanazarova (KGZ)	5
Tetiana Rizhko (UKR)	2
Yuliana Yaneva (BUL)	4
Ami Ishii (JPN)	8

Quarterfinals
Meerim Zhumanazarova (KGZ)
Ami Ishii (JPN)	WO

=== Repechage ===
Repechage round 2
Emilija Jakovljević (SRB)	0
Yelena Shalygina (KAZ)	6^{F}
Irina Rîngaci (MDA)	13
Alejandra Rivera (MEX)	2

Repechage round 3
Yelena Shalygina (KAZ)	2
Koumba Larroque (FRA)	3
Irina Rîngaci (MDA)	6^{F}
Adéla Hanzlíčková (CZE)	0

Bronze medals
Koumba Larroque (FRA)	10
Emma Bruntil (USA)	0
Irina Rîngaci (MDA)	8
Ami Ishii (JPN)	8

Olympic wrestle-off
Emma Bruntil (USA)	0
Ami Ishii (JPN)	2

== Final standing ==
Rank	Athlete
1st place, gold medalist(s)	Buse Tosun Çavuşoğlu (TUR)
2nd place, silver medalist(s)	Enkhsaikhany Delgermaa (MGL)
3rd place, bronze medalist(s)	Koumba Larroque (FRA)
3rd place, bronze medalist(s)	Irina Rîngaci (MDA)
5	Ami Ishii (JPN)
5	Emma Bruntil (USA)
7	Vusala Parfianovich (AIN)
8	Yelena Shalygina (KAZ)
9	Adéla Hanzlíčková (CZE)
10	Meerim Zhumanazarova (KGZ)
11	Tetiana Rizhko (UKR)
12	Nicoll Parrado (COL)
13	Blessing Oborududu (NGR)
14	Yuliana Yaneva (BUL)
15	Zhou Feng (CHN)
16	Alejandra Rivera (MEX)
17	Wiktoria Chołuj (POL)
18	Olivia Di Bacco (CAN)
19	Emilija Jakovljević (SRB)
20	Khadija Jlassi (TUN)
21	Alexandra Anghel (ROU)
22	Gabriela Rocha (BRA)
23	Tindra Sjöberg (SWE)
24	Danutė Domikaitytė (LTU)
25	Noémi Szabados (HUN)
26	Hanna Sadchanka (AIN)
27	Lại Diệu Thương (VIE)
28	Firuza Esenbaeva (UZB)
29	Zsuzsanna Molnár (SVK)
30	Yanet Sovero (PER)
31	Nerea Pampín (ESP)
32	Kwon Jeum-eun (KOR)
33	Priyanka (UWW)

Qualified for the 2024 Summer Olympics
