= 2021 U23 World Wrestling Championships – Women's freestyle 68 kg =

The women's freestyle 68 kilograms is a competition featured at the 2021 U23 World Wrestling Championships, and was held in Belgrade, Serbia on 3 and 4 November.

== Medalists ==
Gold	Koumba Larroque (FRA)
Silver	Vusala Parfianovich (RUS)
Bronze	Enkhsaikhany Delgermaa (MGL)
Bronze	Oksana Chudyk (UKR)

== Results ==
Legend

- F — Won by fall

=== Main bracket ===
Round of 16
Monika Sheoran (IND)	0
Koumba Larroque (FRA)	10^{F}
Nesrin Baş (TUR)	1
Alyvia Fiske (USA)	3^{F}

Quarterfinals
Dariga Aben (KAZ)	6
Sophia Schäfle (GER)	8^{F}
Vusala Parfianovich (RUS)	3
Enkhsaikhany Delgermaa (MGL)	3
Oksana Chudyk (UKR)	6^{F}
Viktória Felhő (HUN)	3
Koumba Larroque (FRA)	12
Alyvia Fiske (USA)	0

Semifinals
Sophia Schäfle (GER)	0
Vusala Parfianovich (RUS)	12^{F}
Oksana Chudyk (UKR)	0
Koumba Larroque (FRA)	3

Final
Vusala Parfianovich (RUS)	0
Koumba Larroque (FRA)	3

=== Repechage ===
Repechage round
Monika Sheoran (IND)	4
Alyvia Fiske (USA)	5

Bronze medals
Enkhsaikhany Delgermaa (MGL)	13^{F}
Sophia Schäfle (GER)	0
Alyvia Fiske (USA)	3
Oksana Chudyk (UKR)	3
