= 2024 World Wrestling Championships – Women's freestyle 72 kg =

Wrestling competitions

Women's freestyle 72 kg at the 2024 World Championships
- Venue: Tirana Olympic Park
- Dates: 29–30 October 2024
- Competitors: 18 from 16 nations

Medalists
gold medal	Ami Ishii	Japan
silver medal	Zhamila Bakbergenova	Kazakhstan
bronze medal	Adéla Hanzlíčková	Czech Republic
bronze medal	Kylie Welker	United States

The women's freestyle 72 kilograms was a competition featured at the 2024 World Wrestling Championships, and was held in Tirana, Albania on 29 and 30 October 2024.

This freestyle wrestling competition consists of a single-elimination tournament, with a repechage used to determine the winner of two bronze medals. The two finalists face off for gold and silver medals. Each wrestler who loses to one of the two finalists moves into the repechage, culminating in a pair of bronze medal matches, featuring the semifinal losers each facing the remaining repechage opponent from their half of the bracket.

Each bout consists of a single round within a six-minute limit, including two halves of three minutes. The wrestler who scores more points is the winner.

== Results ==
Legend

- F — Won by fall

=== Final ===
Final
Zhamila Bakbergenova (KAZ)	6
Ami Ishii (JPN)	8

=== Top half ===
Round of 32
Thamires Machado (BRA)	1
Vusala Parfianovich (AIN)	3

Round of 16
Zhamila Bakbergenova (KAZ)	10^{F}
Emilia Creciun (MDA)	0
Vusala Parfianovich (AIN)	1
Adéla Hanzlíčková (CZE)	11
Noémi Szabados (HUN)	6
Anastasiya Zimiankova (AIN)	2
Tindra Sjöberg (SWE)	0
Zorigtyn Bolortungalag (MGL)	2^{F}

Quarterfinals
Zhamila Bakbergenova (KAZ)	6
Adéla Hanzlíčková (CZE)	3
Noémi Szabados (HUN)	0
Zorigtyn Bolortungalag (MGL)	8^{F}

Semifinals
Zhamila Bakbergenova (KAZ)	8
Zorigtyn Bolortungalag (MGL)	6

=== Bottom half ===
Round of 32
Kylie Welker (USA)	10
Aleah Nickel (CAN)	0

Round of 16
Alexandra Anghel (ROU)	0
Ami Ishii (JPN)	6
Bipasha Dahiya (IND)	3
Anastasiya Alpyeyeva (UKR)	6
Pauline Lecarpentier (FRA)	0
Kylie Welker (USA)	4
Nazar Batır (TUR)	0
Jiang Qian (CHN)	4^{F}

Quarterfinals
Ami Ishii (JPN)	6^{F}
Anastasiya Alpyeyeva (UKR)	1
Kylie Welker (USA)	7^{F}
Jiang Qian (CHN)	2

Semifinals
Ami Ishii (JPN)	12
Kylie Welker (USA)	1

=== Repechage ===
Repechage round 2
Emilia Creciun (MDA)	0
Adéla Hanzlíčková (CZE)	8^{F}
Alexandra Anghel (ROU)	4
Anastasiya Alpyeyeva (UKR)	4

Bronze medals
Adéla Hanzlíčková (CZE)	2
Zorigtyn Bolortungalag (MGL)	0
Alexandra Anghel (ROU)	2
Kylie Welker (USA)	5

== Final standing ==
Rank	Athlete
1st place, gold medalist(s)	Ami Ishii (JPN)
2nd place, silver medalist(s)	Zhamila Bakbergenova (KAZ)
3rd place, bronze medalist(s)	Adéla Hanzlíčková (CZE)
3rd place, bronze medalist(s)	Kylie Welker (USA)
5	Zorigtyn Bolortungalag (MGL)
5	Alexandra Anghel (ROU)
7	Jiang Qian (CHN)
8	Anastasiya Alpyeyeva (UKR)
9	Vusala Parfianovich (AIN)
10	Noémi Szabados (HUN)
11	Bipasha Dahiya (IND)
12	Anastasiya Zimiankova (AIN)
13	Thamires Machado (BRA)
14	Tindra Sjöberg (SWE)
15	Pauline Lecarpentier (FRA)
16	Nazar Batır (TUR)
17	Aleah Nickel (CAN)
18	Emilia Creciun (MDA)
