= Wrestling at the 2022 Asian Games – Women's freestyle 68 kg =

Women's freestyle 68 kg at the 2022 Asian Games
- Venue: Lin'an Sports and Culture Centre
- Date: 6 October 2023
- Competitors: 10 from 10 nations

Medalists
| gold medal | Zhou Feng | China |
| silver medal | Nurzat Nurtaeva | Kyrgyzstan |
| bronze medal | Naruha Matsuyuki | Japan |
| bronze medal | Enkhsaikhany Delgermaa | Mongolia |

The women's freestyle 68 kilograms wrestling competition at the 2022 Asian Games in Hangzhou was held on 5 October 2023 at the Lin'an Sports and Culture Centre.

This freestyle wrestling competition consists of a single-elimination tournament, with a repechage used to determine the winner of two bronze medals. The two finalists face off for gold and silver medals. Each wrestler who loses to one of the two finalists moves into the repechage, culminating in a pair of bronze medal matches featuring the semifinal losers each facing the remaining repechage opponent from their half of the bracket.

== Schedule ==
All times are China Standard Time (UTC+08:00)

| Date | Time | Event |
|---|---|---|
| Friday, 6 October 2023 | 10:00 | 1/8 finals |
| Friday, 6 October 2023 | 10:00 | 1/4 finals |
| Friday, 6 October 2023 | 10:00 | Semifinals |
| Friday, 6 October 2023 | 17:00 | Finals |

== Results ==
Legend

- F — Won by fall

=== Main bracket ===
1/8 finals
Firuza Esenbaeva (UZB) | 0
Naruha Matsuyuki (JPN) | 5
Enkhsaikhany Delgermaa (MGL) | 9
Lại Diệu Thương (VIE) | 0

1/4 finals
Park Hyeon-yeong (KOR) | 0
Naruha Matsuyuki (JPN) | 8^{F}
Chea Kanha (CAM) | 0
Zhou Feng (CHN) | 10
Yelena Shalygina (KAZ) | 7
Nurzat Nurtaeva (KGZ) | 8
Enkhsaikhany Delgermaa (MGL) | 10
Radhika Jaglan (IND) | 5

Semifinals
Naruha Matsuyuki (JPN) | 0
Zhou Feng (CHN) | 5
Nurzat Nurtaeva (KGZ) | 10
Enkhsaikhany Delgermaa (MGL) | 8

Gold medal match
Zhou Feng (CHN) | 13
Nurzat Nurtaeva (KGZ) | 2

=== Repechage ===
Bronze medal matches
Chea Kanha (CAM) | 0
Naruha Matsuyuki (JPN) | 2^{F}
Yelena Shalygina (KAZ) | 6
Enkhsaikhany Delgermaa (MGL) | 10^{F}

== Final standing ==
| Rank | Athlete |
|---|---|
| 1st place, gold medalist(s) | Zhou Feng (CHN) |
| 2nd place, silver medalist(s) | Nurzat Nurtaeva (KGZ) |
| 3rd place, bronze medalist(s) | Naruha Matsuyuki (JPN) |
| 3rd place, bronze medalist(s) | Enkhsaikhany Delgermaa (MGL) |
| 5 | Chea Kanha (CAM) |
| 5 | Yelena Shalygina (KAZ) |
| 7 | Radhika Jaglan (IND) |
| 8 | Firuza Esenbaeva (UZB) |
| 9 | Park Hyeon-yeong (KOR) |
| 10 | Lại Diệu Thương (VIE) |
