= Long Jia =

Chinese freestyle wrestler

Personal information
- Born: 29 August 1998 (age 28)

Sport
- Country: China
- Sport: Amateur wrestling
- Weight class: 65 kg
- Event: Freestyle
Medal record
Women's freestyle wrestling
Representing China
World Championships
Gold medal – first place	2024 Tirana	65 kg
Gold medal – first place	2026 Astana	68 kg
Silver medal – second place	2022 Belgrade	65 kg
Bronze medal – third place	2025 Zagreb	68 kg
Asian Games
Bronze medal – third place	2026 Aichi–Nagoya	68 kg
Asian Beach Games
Gold medal – first place	2026 Sanya	70kg
Asian Championships
Gold medal – first place	2023 Astana	65 kg
Gold medal – first place	2026 Bishkek	72 kg

Long Jia (Chinese: 龙 佳, born 29 August 1998) is a Chinese freestyle wrestler. She won the silver medal in the 65 kg event at the 2022 World Wrestling Championships held in Belgrade, Serbia.

In 2021, she competed at the Asian Olympic Qualification Tournament and qualified for the 2020 Summer Olympics in Tokyo, Japan. She thus represented China at the 2020 Summer Olympics in the 62 kg event.

She lost her bronze medal match in the women's 62 kg event at the 2022 Asian Games held in Hangzhou, China.

She competed at the 2024 Asian Wrestling Olympic Qualification Tournament in Bishkek, Kyrgyzstan hoping to qualify for the 2024 Summer Olympics in Paris, France. She was eliminated in her first match and she did not qualify for the Olympics.

== Achievements ==
Year	Tournament	Location	Result	Event
2022	World Championships	Belgrade, Serbia	2nd	Freestyle 65 kg
2023	Asian Championships	Astana, Kazakhstan	1st	Freestyle 65 kg
2024	World Championships	Tirana, Albania	1st	Freestyle 65 kg
