= Rin Miyaji =

Japanese freestyle wrestler

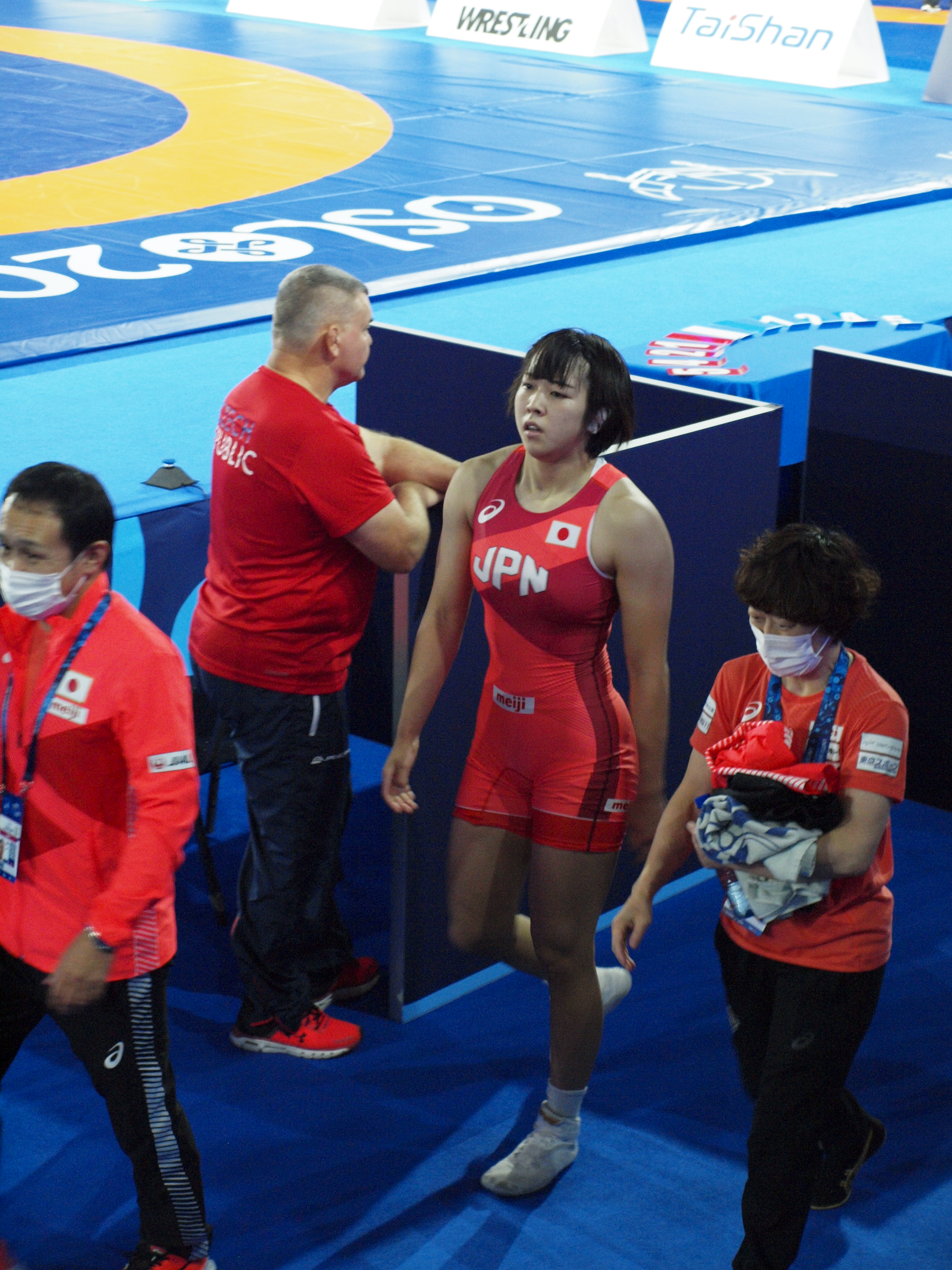
- Rin Miyaji at the 2021 World Wrestling Championships in Oslo, Norway

Personal information
- Nationality: Japanese

Sport
- Country: Japan
- Event: Freestyle
Medal record
Women's freestyle wrestling
Representing Japan
World Championships
Silver medal – second place	2021 Oslo	68 kg

Rin Miyaji is a Japanese freestyle wrestler. She won the silver medal in the women's 68 kg event at the 2021 World Wrestling Championships in Oslo, Norway.
