= 2017 European U23 Wrestling Championships =

2017 European U23 Wrestling Championship
- Host city: Szombathely, Hungary
- Dates: 28 March – 2 April 2017

Champions
- Freestyle: Russia
- Greco-Roman: Georgia
- Women: Ukraine

The 2017 European U23 Wrestling Championships was the 3rd edition of European U23 Wrestling Championships of combined events, and took place from March 28 to 2 April in Szombathely, Hungary.

== Medal table ==
* Host nation (Hungary)

| Rank | Nation | Gold | Silver | Bronze | Total |
|---|---|---|---|---|---|
| 1 | Azerbaijan | 5 | 1 | 5 | 11 |
| 2 | Russia | 3 | 6 | 7 | 16 |
| 3 | Turkey | 3 | 3 | 2 | 8 |
| 4 | Georgia | 3 | 2 | 6 | 11 |
| 5 | Ukraine | 2 | 1 | 8 | 11 |
| 6 | Hungary* | 2 | 1 | 2 | 5 |
| 7 | Sweden | 2 | 1 | 0 | 3 |
| 8 | Belarus | 1 | 2 | 3 | 6 |
| 9 | Finland | 1 | 1 | 1 | 3 |
| 10 | France | 1 | 1 | 0 | 2 |
| 11 | Poland | 1 | 0 | 1 | 2 |
| 12 | Moldova | 0 | 1 | 2 | 3 |
| 13 | Lithuania | 0 | 1 | 1 | 2 |
| 14 | Austria | 0 | 1 | 0 | 1 |
| 14 | Croatia | 0 | 1 | 0 | 1 |
| 14 | Czech Republic | 0 | 1 | 0 | 1 |
| 17 | Germany | 0 | 0 | 5 | 5 |
| 18 | Bulgaria | 0 | 0 | 2 | 2 |
| 18 | Romania | 0 | 0 | 2 | 2 |
| 20 | Norway | 0 | 0 | 1 | 1 |
| Totals (20 entries) | | 24 | 24 | 48 | 96 |

== Team ranking ==
| Rank | Men's freestyle | | Men's Greco-Roman | | Women's freestyle | |
| Rank | Team | Points | Team | Points | Team | Points |
|---|---|---|---|---|---|---|
| 1 | Russia | 61 | Georgia | 48 | Ukraine | 57 |
| 2 | Georgia | 60 | Hungary | 42 | Russia | 53 |
| 3 | Turkey | 58 | Turkey | 41 | Belarus | 41 |
| 4 | Azerbaijan | 53 | Ukraine | 41 | Turkey | 34 |
| 5 | Ukraine | 47 | Russia | 37 | Hungary | 30 |

== Medal summary ==
=== Men's freestyle ===
| Event | Gold | Silver | Bronze |
|---|---|---|---|
| 57 kg | (Turkey) Süleyman Atlı | (Russia) Azamat Tuskaev | (Ukraine) Andriy Yatsenko |
| 57 kg | (Turkey) Süleyman Atlı | (Russia) Azamat Tuskaev | (Moldova) Ivan Zamfirov |
| 61 kg | (Russia) Gadzhimurad Rashidov | (Turkey) Sedat Özdemir | (Azerbaijan) Ali Rahimzade |
| 61 kg | (Russia) Gadzhimurad Rashidov | (Turkey) Sedat Özdemir | (Georgia (country)) Shota Phartenadze |
| 65 kg | (Azerbaijan) Teymur Mammadov | (Turkey) Haydar Yavuz | (Russia) Imam Adzhiev |
| 65 kg | (Azerbaijan) Teymur Mammadov | (Turkey) Haydar Yavuz | (Georgia (country)) Iveriko Julakidze |
| 70 kg | (Azerbaijan) Gadzhimurad Omarov | (Russia) Zaurbek Sidakov | (Ukraine) Vasyl Mykhailov |
| 70 kg | (Azerbaijan) Gadzhimurad Omarov | (Russia) Zaurbek Sidakov | (Georgia (country)) Mirza Skhulukhia |
| 74 kg | (Georgia (country)) Avtandil Kentchadze | (France) Zelimkhan Khadjiev | (Finland) Henri Aleksi Selenius |
| 74 kg | (Georgia (country)) Avtandil Kentchadze | (France) Zelimkhan Khadjiev | (Azerbaijan) Ismail Abdullaev |
| 86 kg | (Turkey) Murat Ertürk | (Hungary) Bendeguz Toth | (Russia) Arsen-Ali Musalaliev |
| 86 kg | (Turkey) Murat Ertürk | (Hungary) Bendeguz Toth | (Azerbaijan) Kanan Aliyev |
| 97 kg | (Georgia (country)) Givi Matcharashvili | (Russia) Georgii Gogaev | (Ukraine) Murazi Mchedlidze |
| 97 kg | (Georgia (country)) Givi Matcharashvili | (Russia) Georgii Gogaev | (Germany) Gennadij Cudinovic |
| 125 kg | (Georgia (country)) Geno Petriashvili | (Belarus) Vitali Piasniak | (Russia) Kazbek Khubulov |
| 125 kg | (Georgia (country)) Geno Petriashvili | (Belarus) Vitali Piasniak | (Poland) Kamil Tomasz Kosciolek |

=== Men's Greco-Roman ===
| Event | Gold | Silver | Bronze |
|---|---|---|---|
| 59 kg | (Azerbaijan) Murad Mammadov | (Russia) Zhambolat Lokyaev | (Georgia (country)) Dato Chkhartishvili |
| 59 kg | (Azerbaijan) Murad Mammadov | (Russia) Zhambolat Lokyaev | (Lithuania) Justas Petravicius |
| 66 kg | (Poland) Roman Pacurkowski | (Russia) Aslan Visaitov | (Bulgaria) Deyvid Dimitrov |
| 66 kg | (Poland) Roman Pacurkowski | (Russia) Aslan Visaitov | (Ukraine) Serhii Kozub |
| 71 kg | (Azerbaijan) Islambek Dadov | (Georgia (country)) Ramaz Zoidze | (Ukraine) Artur Politaiev |
| 71 kg | (Azerbaijan) Islambek Dadov | (Georgia (country)) Ramaz Zoidze | (Hungary) Robert Fritsch |
| 75 kg | (Hungary) Zoltán Lévai | (Croatia) Antonio Kamenjasevic | (Russia) Akhmed Kaytsukov |
| 75 kg | (Hungary) Zoltán Lévai | (Croatia) Antonio Kamenjasevic | (Belarus) Tsimur Berdyieu |
| 80 kg | (Sweden) Alex Kessidis | (Georgia (country)) Gela Bolkvadze | (Azerbaijan) Eltun Vazirzade |
| 80 kg | (Sweden) Alex Kessidis | (Georgia (country)) Gela Bolkvadze | (Ukraine) Andrii Antoniuk |
| 85 kg | (Sweden) Zakarias Berg | (Russia) Ruslan Iusupov | (Georgia (country)) Lasha Gobadze |
| 85 kg | (Sweden) Zakarias Berg | (Russia) Ruslan Iusupov | (Germany) Denis Kudla |
| 98 kg | (Azerbaijan) Orkhan Nuriyev | (Finland) Matti Kuosmanen | (Turkey) Fatih Başköy |
| 98 kg | (Azerbaijan) Orkhan Nuriyev | (Finland) Matti Kuosmanen | (Germany) Muhammed Sever |
| 130 kg | (Turkey) Osman Yıldırım | (Lithuania) Mantas Knystautas | (Georgia (country)) Zviadi Pataridze |
| 130 kg | (Turkey) Osman Yıldırım | (Lithuania) Mantas Knystautas | (Norway) Oskar Marvik |

=== Women's freestyle ===
| Event | Gold | Silver | Bronze |
|---|---|---|---|
| 48 kg | (Russia) Anzhelika Vetoshkina | (Ukraine) Ilona Semkiv | (Turkey) Evin Demirhan |
| 48 kg | (Russia) Anzhelika Vetoshkina | (Ukraine) Ilona Semkiv | (Bulgaria) Miglena Selishka |
| 53 kg | (Ukraine) Lilya Horishna | (Azerbaijan) Leyla Gurbanova | (Moldova) Iulia Leorda |
| 53 kg | (Ukraine) Lilya Horishna | (Azerbaijan) Leyla Gurbanova | (Belarus) Katsiaryna Pichkouskaya |
| 55 kg | (Belarus) Iryna Kurachkina | (Turkey) Bediha Gün | (Russia) Nina Menkenova |
| 55 kg | (Belarus) Iryna Kurachkina | (Turkey) Bediha Gün | (Hungary) Ramona Galambos |
| 58 kg | (Ukraine) Tetyana Kit | (Sweden) Elin Nilsson | (Azerbaijan) Alyona Kolesnik |
| 58 kg | (Ukraine) Tetyana Kit | (Sweden) Elin Nilsson | (Germany) Luisa Niemesch |
| 60 kg | (Russia) Liubov Ovcharova | (Moldova) Anastasia Nichita | (Belarus) Nade Dragunova |
| 60 kg | (Russia) Liubov Ovcharova | (Moldova) Anastasia Nichita | (Ukraine) Oksana Herhel |
| 63 kg | (Finland) Petra Olli | (Czech Republic) Adela Hanzlickova | (Russia) Maria Kuznetsova |
| 63 kg | (Finland) Petra Olli | (Czech Republic) Adela Hanzlickova | (Romania) Kriszta Incze |
| 69 kg | (France) Koumba Larroque | (Austria) Martina Kuenz | (Russia) Khanum Velieva |
| 69 kg | (France) Koumba Larroque | (Austria) Martina Kuenz | (Romania) Alexandra Anghel |
| 75 kg | (Hungary) Zsanett Nemeth | (Belarus) Natallia Lanko | (Ukraine) Iryna Pasichnyk |
| 75 kg | (Hungary) Zsanett Nemeth | (Belarus) Natallia Lanko | (Germany) Francy Rädelt |
