= Wrestling at the 2026 Asian Games – Women's freestyle 68 kg =

Women's freestyle 68 kg at the 2026 Asian Games
- Venue: Inae Sports Center
- Date: 30 September 2026
- Competitors: 10 from 10 nations

Medalists
gold medal	Ami Ishii	Japan
silver medal	Pak Sol-gum	North Korea
bronze medal	Meerim Zhumanazarova	Kyrgyzstan
bronze medal	Long Jia	China

The women's freestyle 68 kilograms wrestling competition at the 2026 Asian Games in Nagoya was held on 30 September 2026 at the Inae Sports Center.

This freestyle wrestling competition consists of a single-elimination tournament, with a repechage used to determine the winner of two bronze medals. The two finalists face off for gold and silver medals. Each wrestler who loses to one of the two finalists moves into the repechage, culminating in a pair of bronze medal matches featuring the semifinal losers each facing the remaining repechage opponent from their half of the bracket.

== Schedule ==
All times are Japan Standard Time (UTC+09:00)

Date	Time	Event
Wednesday, 30 September 2026	10:30	1/8 finals
Wednesday, 30 September 2026	10:30	1/4 finals
Wednesday, 30 September 2026	10:30	Semifinals
Wednesday, 30 September 2026	10:30	Repechages
Wednesday, 30 September 2026	18:00	Finals

== Results ==
Legend

- F — Won by fall

=== Main bracket ===
1/8 finals
Pak Sol-gum (PRK)	4
Nisha Dahiya (IND)	4
Zhamila Bakbergenova (KAZ)	2
Ami Ishii (JPN)	9

1/4 finals
Park Hyeon-yeong (KOR)	0
Pak Sol-gum (PRK)	11
Firuza Esenbaeva (UZB)	0
Meerim Zhumanazarova (KGZ)	8^{F}
Đặng Thị Linh (VIE)	0
Long Jia (CHN)	10
Ami Ishii (JPN)	11
Enkhsaikhany Delgermaa (MGL)	0

Semifinals
Pak Sol-gum (PRK)	1
Meerim Zhumanazarova (KGZ)	1
Long Jia (CHN)	4
Ami Ishii (JPN)	8^{F}

Final
Pak Sol-gum (PRK)	2
Ami Ishii (JPN)	7

=== Repechage ===
Repechage
Nisha Dahiya (IND)	4
Park Hyeon-yeong (KOR)	5^{F}
Zhamila Bakbergenova (KAZ)	0
Enkhsaikhany Delgermaa (MGL)	6

Bronze medal matches
Park Hyeon-yeong (KOR)	1
Meerim Zhumanazarova (KGZ)	8^{F}
Enkhsaikhany Delgermaa (MGL)	6
Long Jia (CHN)	7

== Final standing ==
Rank	Athlete
1st place, gold medalist(s)	Ami Ishii (JPN)
2nd place, silver medalist(s)	Pak Sol-gum (PRK)
3rd place, bronze medalist(s)	Meerim Zhumanazarova (KGZ)
3rd place, bronze medalist(s)	Long Jia (CHN)
5	Park Hyeon-yeong (KOR)
5	Enkhsaikhany Delgermaa (MGL)
7	Nisha Dahiya (IND)
8	Zhamila Bakbergenova (KAZ)
9	Firuza Esenbaeva (UZB)
10	Đặng Thị Linh (VIE)
