= Ami Ishii =

Japanese freestyle wrestler

Personal information
- Born: 11 December 2002 (age 23) Gunma Prefecture, Japan

Sport
- Country: Japan
- Sport: Amateur wrestling
- Weight class: 68 kg; 72 kg
- Event: Freestyle
Medal record
Women's freestyle wrestling
Representing Japan
World Championships
Gold medal – first place	2024 Tirana	72 kg
Gold medal – first place	2025 Zagreb	68 kg
Silver medal – second place	2022 Belgrade	68 kg
Asian Games
Gold medal – first place	2026 Aichi–Nagoya	68 kg
Asian Championships
Gold medal – first place	2023 Astana	68 kg
Grand Prix
Gold medal – first place	2020 Klippan	65 kg
Gold medal – first place	2025 Tirana	68 kg
World U23 Championships
Gold medal – first place	2024 Tirana	68 kg
Junior World Championships
Gold medal – first place	2022 Sofia	68 kg

Ami Ishii (石井 亜海, Ishii Ami; born 11 December 2002) is a Japanese freestyle wrestler. She won the gold medal in the women's 72 kg event at the 2024 World Wrestling Championships.

== Career ==
In 2022, she won the silver medal in the women's 68 kg event at the World Wrestling Championships held in Belgrade, Serbia. She won the gold medal in her event at the 2023 Asian Wrestling Championships held in Astana, Kazakhstan.

Ishii lost her bronze medal match in the women's 68 kg event at the 2023 World Wrestling Championships held in Belgrade, Serbia. She won a separate match against Emma Bruntil of the United States and she earned a quota place for Japan for the 2024 Summer Olympics in Paris, France.

== Achievements ==
Year	Tournament	Location	Result	Event
2022	World Championships	Belgrade, Serbia	2nd	Freestyle 68 kg
2023	Asian Championships	Astana, Kazakhstan	1st	Freestyle 68 kg
2024	World Championships	Tirana, Albania	1st	Freestyle 72 kg
2025	World Championships	Zagreb, Croatia	1st	Freestyle 68 kg
2026	Asian Games	Aichi and Nagoya, Japan	1st	Freestyle 68 kg
