= Pak Sol-gum =

North Korean freestyle wrestler (born 2005)

Sport
- Sport: Amateur wrestling
- Weight class: 68 kg
- Event: Freestyle
Medal record
Women's freestyle wrestling
Representing North Korea
Asian Games
| Silver medal – second place | 2026 Aichi–Nagoya | 68 kg |
Asian Championships
| Silver medal – second place | 2025 Amman | 68 kg |

Pak Sol-gum (Korean: 박솔검) is a North Korean freestyle wrestler. She placed 5th in the women's 68 kg event at the 2024 Summer Olympics in Paris.
