= Tamyra Mensah-Stock =

American wrestler (born 1992)

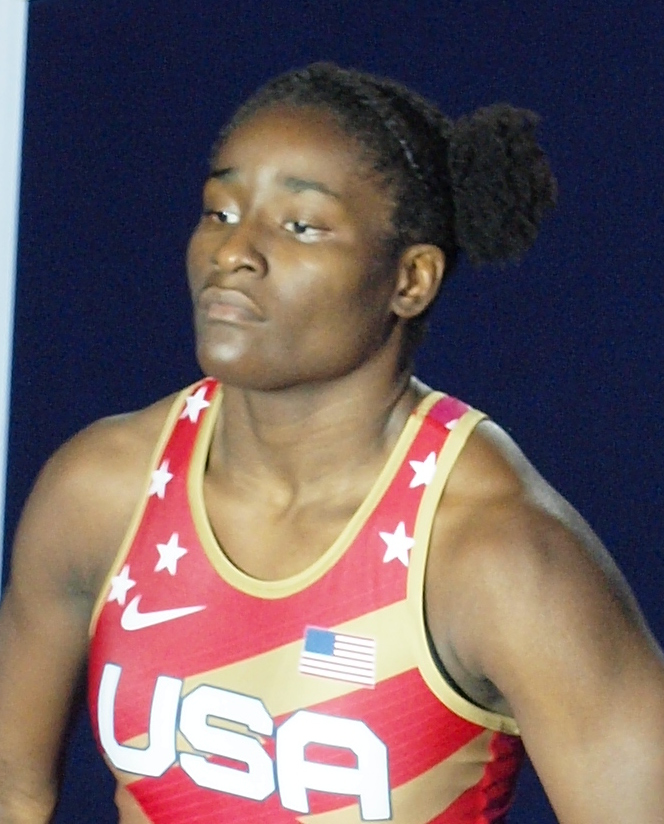
- Mensah-Stock at the 2021 World Wrestling Championships

Personal information
- Full name: Tamyra Mariama Mensah-Stock
- Born: Tamyra Mariama Mensah; October 11, 1992 (age 34) Chicago, Illinois, U.S.
- Home town: Katy, Texas, U.S.
- Height: 5 ft 6 in (1.67 m)
- Weight: 152 lb (69 kg)
- Spouse: Jacob Stock

Sport
- Country: United States
- Sport: Wrestling
- Event: Freestyle
- College team: Wayland Baptist University
- Club: Titan Mercury Wrestling Club
- Coached by: Terry Steiner; Izzy Izboinikov
- Professional wrestling career
- Ring name(s): Tamyra Mensah-Stock; Tyra Mae Steele
- Billed height: 5 ft 6 in (168 cm)
- Billed weight: 152 lb (69 kg)
- Trained by: WWE Performance Center; The Undertaker
- Debut: March 30, 2024
Medal record
Women's freestyle wrestling
Representing the United States
Olympic Games
Gold medal – first place	2020 Tokyo	68 kg
World Championships
Gold medal – first place	2019 Nur-Sultan	68 kg
Gold medal – first place	2022 Belgrade	68 kg
Bronze medal – third place	2018 Budapest	68 kg
Bronze medal – third place	2021 Oslo	68 kg
Pan American Games
Gold medal – first place	2019 Lima	68 kg
Pan American Championships
Gold medal – first place	2019 Buenos Aires	68 kg
Gold medal – first place	2020 Ottawa	68 kg
Gold medal – first place	2021 Guatemala City	68 kg
Golden Grand Prix Ivan Yarygin
Gold medal – first place	2017 Krasnoyarsk	69 kg
Gold medal – first place	2018 Krasnoyarsk	68 kg
Gold medal – first place	2019 Krasnoyarsk	72 kg

Tamyra Mariama Mensah-Stock (born October 11, 1992, née Mensah) is an American former amateur freestyle wrestler. She competed in women's freestyle wrestling, winning the gold medal at the Tokyo Olympics on August 3, 2021, becoming the first Black woman to win gold in women's freestyle wrestling.

Mensah-Stock had a tenure as a professional wrestler in WWE under the ring name Tyra Mae Steele. She was the inaugural women's winner of WWE LFG (Legends & Future Greats), a reality competition series that follows up-and-coming wrestlers from WWE's developmental system competing for a contract in WWE's NXT division while being mentored by WWE's current, veteran, and Hall of Fame talents.

== Early life and education ==
Mensah-Stock was born in Chicago, Illinois, and grew up in the suburbs of Houston, Texas. Her father was a Ghanaian who lived in Ghana until the age of 30, and her mother is from Illinois.

At Morton Ranch High School in Katy, Texas, her twin sister, Tarkyia, joined the wrestling team their freshman year while Tamyra pursued track and field. She joined the wrestling team her sophomore year, at age 15, after her sister and the wrestling coach, Mark Balser, convinced her to take part in a wrestling practice session. However, she almost quit after her father's fatal car accident, on his way home from one of her high school wrestling matches. She blamed wrestling for her father's untimely death. She saw him as her biggest supporter.

In 2010 and 2011, she became the Texas High School Girls Champion having finished second in 2009. In 2010, she became the U.S. Junior National runner-up.

After high school, she attended Wayland Baptist University (WBU) where she earned a Bachelor’s Degree in Exercise and Sports Science. As a student wrestler, she became the Women's Collegiate Wrestling Association (WCWA) Nationals Champion in 2014 and 2017. She also took third place in the 2013 at the U.S. Universities Championship and first place in 2015.

== Amateur career ==
Although she won the 68 kg class at the 2016 U.S. Olympic Trials, none of the athletes from the United States secured a spot to compete in relevant 68 kg weight category at the 2016 Rio Olympics, so she spent her time in Brazil as a practice partner for teammates who were eligible in other weight categories.

She won the gold medal in the women's 68 kg event during the 2019 World Wrestling Championships and also qualified to represent United States at the 2020 Summer Olympics. She was one of the three gold medalists for the United States in women's freestyle category at the 2019 World Championships, which also marked the first instance where U.S. delegation claimed three gold medals in women's wrestling event at a single World Championships.

Mensah-Stock also claimed a bronze medal in the women's 68 kg event at the 2018 World Wrestling Championships.

In January 2021, she won the gold medal in the women's 68 kg event at the Grand Prix de France Henri Deglane 2021 held in Nice, France. She also won the gold medal in the 68 kg event at the Matteo Pellicone Ranking Series 2021 held in Rome, Italy.

On August 3, 2021, she won the gold medal in the women's freestyle 68 kg, after defeating Nigeria's Blessing Oborududu 4–1, at the 2020 Summer Olympics. She became the first female African-American and the first Black women's wrestler to win Olympic gold, and only the second female American to win gold, after Helen Maroulis in 2016. Two months after the Olympics, she won one of the bronze medals in the women's 68 kg event at the 2021 World Wrestling Championships in Oslo, Norway.

She won the gold medal in her event at the 2022 Tunis Ranking Series event held in Tunis, Tunisia.

== Professional wrestling ==
Mensah-Stock made a brief appearance at WWE SummerSlam on August 21, 2021.

On May 3, 2023, it was announced that Mensah-Stock had signed with WWE to become a professional wrestler. She is the third Olympic wrestling gold medalist (after Kurt Angle and Gable Steveson) and the first female Olympic wrestling gold medalist to sign with the promotion. Mensah-Stock made an appearance on the January 30, 2024 episode of NXT as a student of Chase University. On the taping of the July 5 edition of NXT Level Up, she made her in-ring debut under the ring name Tyra Mae Steele in a losing effort against Wren Sinclair.

In February 2025, Steele participated in the first season of LFG (Legends & Future Greats), a reality television series involving "rising talents" competing for a NXT contract. She was mentored by The Undertaker and went on to become the first women's winner. On June 3 episode of NXT, Steele made her NXT in-ring debut where she defeated Arianna Grace. On the July 9 episode of Evolve, Steele announced that she has moved to the Evolve brand. The following week, Steele won her debut Evolve match against Kylie Rae and Chantel Moneroe in a triple threat match. On the August 12 episode of NXT, she made her unannounced return to NXT as she assisted Tavion Heights (who is a fellow Olympic wrestler) in his feud against Ethan Page and Chelsea Green. This led to Steele making her debut PLE appearance at NXT Heatwave on August 24, where Heights and Steele lost to Page and Green in a mixed tag team match.

Steele was released by WWE on April 24, 2026, ending her near three-year tenure with the promotion. She wrestled her final WWE match on the April 29 (taped on April 10) episode of Evolve, losing to Kali Armstrong.

== Personal life ==
In 2016, Mensah-Stock married Jacob Stock, who wrestled alongside his future wife at Morton Ranch High School and at Wayland Baptist University. Mensah-Stock is a pescatarian.

== Championships and accomplishments ==
- WWE
  - Women’s LFG Season 1 winner
