= Navjot Kaur =

Indian freestyle wrestler (born 1990)

Personal information
- Born: 10 February 1990 (age 36) Tarn Taran, Punjab, India

Sport
- Sport: Wrestling
- Event: Freestyle
Medal record
Women's freestyle wrestling
Representing India
World Cup
Bronze medal – third place	2013 Ulanbaatar	67kg
Asian Championships
Gold medal – first place	2018 Bishkek	65kg
Silver medal – second place	2013 New Delhi	67kg
Bronze medal – third place	2011 Tashkent	67kg
Asian Indoor Games
Bronze medal – third place	2017 Ashgabat	69kg
Commonwealth Games
Bronze medal – third place	2014 Glasgow	69kg

Navjot Kaur (born 10 February 1990) is an Indian freestyle wrestler. She is the first Indian woman wrestler to win an Asian Championships gold medal.

== Career ==
=== 2011 Asian Wrestling Championships ===
At the tournament in Tashkent, Uzbekistan, Navjot faced Banzyaragzh Oyunsuren of Mongolia in the semi-finals of the women's freestyle 67 kg category and lost 3:1. She then contested the bronze medal match against Yuanyuan Wang of China and won the bronze medal, beating her Chinese opponent 5:0.

=== 2013 Wrestling World Cup ===
In the Wrestling World Cup held in Ulan-Baatar, Mongolia, Navjot finished third and won the bronze medal in the women's freestyle 67 kg category.

=== 2013 Asian Wrestling Championships ===
At the tournament in New Delhi, India, Navjot faced Hyekung Ham of South Korea in the semi-finals of the women's freestyle 67 kg category and won 3:1. She then qualified for the gold medal bout against Nasanburmaa Ochirbat of Mongolia but lost 1:3 to settle for the silver medal.

=== 2014 Commonwealth Games ===
Competing in the women's freestyle 69 kg category, Navjot faced Dori Yeats of Canada in the semi-finals and lost 4:0 to her. But she was able to compete in the bronze medal bout and won the bronze medal, beating home favourite Sarah Jones of Scotland 4:0.

=== Pro Wrestling League ===
Navjot is one of the two Indian female wrestlers bought by the Bangalore franchise (owned by JSW Sport) of the Pro Wrestling League.

The Pro Wrestling League was scheduled to be held from 10 to 27 December across 6 cities.

== Other titles ==
- Dave Schultz Memorial Tournament, 2010 - 6th place

== See also ==
- Official FILA page of Navjot Kaur
