= Alla Cherkasova =

Ukrainian wrestler (born 1989)

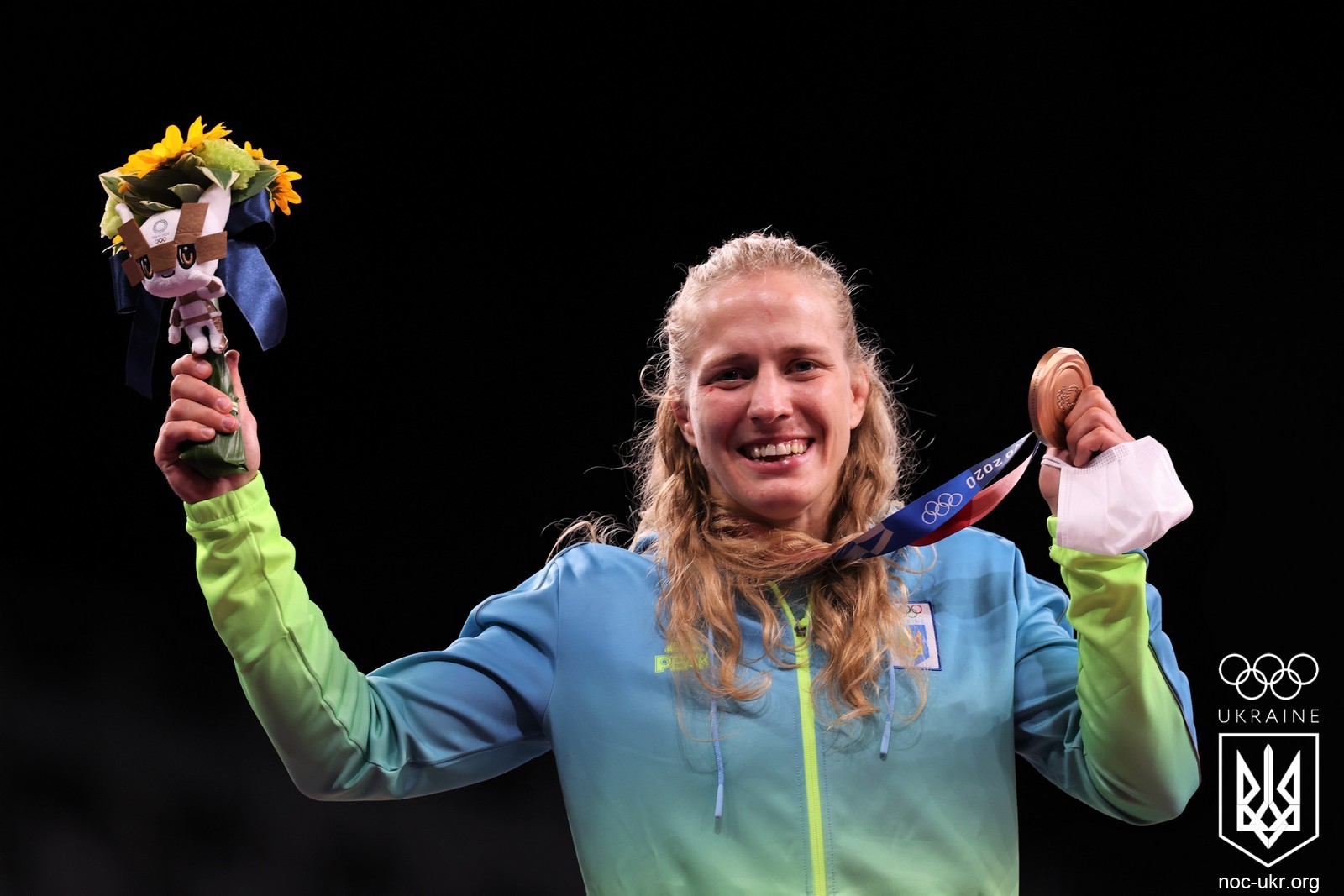
- Cherkasova at the 2020 Summer Olympics podium

Personal information
- Native name: Алла Костянтинівна Черкасова
- Full name: Alla Kostyantinivna Cherkasova
- Born: 5 May 1989 (age 37) Lviv, Ukrainian SSR, Soviet Union
- Height: 165 cm (5 ft 5 in)

Sport
- Weight class: 67–69 kg (148–152 lb)
- Club: Kolos (Lviv)
Medal record
Women's freestyle wrestling
Representing Ukraine
Olympic Games
| Bronze medal – third place | 2020 Tokyo | 68 kg |
World Championships
| Gold medal – first place | 2018 Budapest | 68 kg |
| Bronze medal – third place | 2010 Moscow | 67 kg |
European Games
| Bronze medal – third place | 2019 Minsk | 68 kg |
European Championships
| Gold medal – first place | 2019 Bucharest | 68 kg |
| Silver medal – second place | 2012 Belgrade | 67 kg |
| Bronze medal – third place | 2016 Riga | 75 kg |
| Bronze medal – third place | 2017 Novi Sad | 69 kg |
| Bronze medal – third place | 2020 Rome | 68 kg |

Alla Kostyantynivna Cherkasova (Ukrainian: Алла Костянтинівна Черкасова; born 5 May 1989) is a Ukrainian wrestler. Competing in the 67 kg category, she is the 2010 World bronze medalist and 2012 European silver medalist. She competed in women's freestyle 75 kg at the 2016 Summer Olympics in Rio de Janeiro. She won one of the bronze medals in the women's 68 kg event at the 2020 Summer Olympics held in Tokyo, Japan.
