= Khanum Velieva =

Russian freestyle wrestler

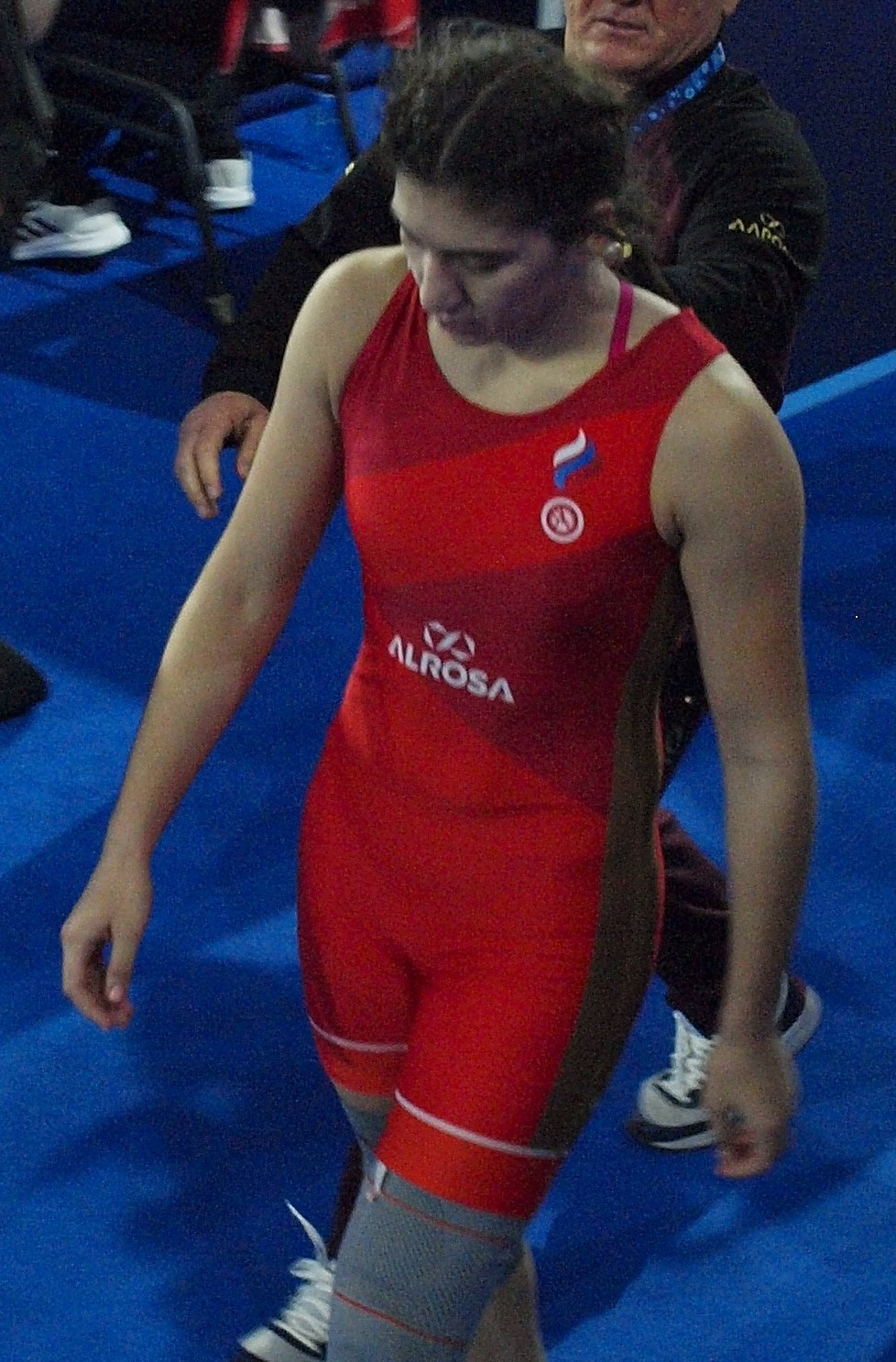
- Velieva in 2021

Personal information
- Native name: Ханум Эльшад-Кызы Велиева
- Full name: Khanum Elshad-Kysy Velieva
- National team: Russia
- Born: 10 April 1999 (age 27) Krasnoyarsk, Russia
- Height: 169 cm (5 ft 7 in)
- Weight: 68 kg (150 lb)

Sport
- Country: Russia
- Sport: Amateur wrestling
- Weight class: 68 kg
- Event: Freestyle
- Club: Mindiashvili wrestling academy
Medal record
Women's freestyle wrestling
Representing Individual Neutral Athletes
Yaşar Doğu Tournament
Bronze medal – third place	2024 Antalya	68 kg
Representing Russian Wrestling Federation
World Championships
Bronze medal – third place	2021 Oslo	68 kg
Yaşar Doğu Tournament
Bronze medal – third place	2022 Istanbul	68 kg
Representing Russia
European Championships
Gold medal – first place	2020 Rome	68 kg
Silver medal – second place	2021 Warsaw	68 kg
Military World Games
Bronze medal – third place	2019 Wuhan	68 kg
Individual World Cup
Bronze medal – third place	2020 Belgrade	68 kg
Golden Grand Prix Ivan Yarygin
Gold medal – first place	2020 Krasnoyarsk	68 kg
Gold medal – first place	2022 Krasnoyarsk	68 kg
Gold medal – first place	2023 Krasnoyarsk	68 kg
Bronze medal – third place	2019 Krasnoyarsk	68 kg
World U23 Championships
Bronze medal – third place	2018 Bucharest	68 kg
European U23 Championship
Silver medal – second place	2018 Istanbul	68 kg
Silver medal – second place	2019 Novi Sad	68 kg
Bronze medal – third place	2017 Szombathely	69 kg
Representing Krasnoyarsk Krai
Golden Grand Prix Ivan Yarygin
Gold medal – first place	2024 Krasnoyarsk	68 kg
Silver medal – second place	2026 Krasnoyarsk	65 kg

Khanum Elshad-Kysy Velieva (Russian: Ханум Эльшад-Кызы Велиева; born 10 April 1999) is a Russian freestyle wrestler. She is a bronze medalist at the World Wrestling Championships and a two-time medalist, including gold, at the European Wrestling Championships. In 2021, she competed at the 2020 Summer Olympics in Tokyo, Japan.

== Career ==
Of Azerbaijani origin, Velieva won one of the bronze medals in the women's 69 kg event at the 2017 European U23 Wrestling Championship held in Szombathely, Hungary. In 2018, she won the silver medal in the women's 68 kg event at the European U23 Wrestling Championship held in Istanbul, Turkey. At the 2018 World U23 Wrestling Championship held in Bucharest, Romania, she won one of the bronze medals in the women's 68 kg event.

In 2019, Velieva won one of the bronze medals in the women's 68 kg event at the Golden Grand Prix Ivan Yarygin held in Krasnoyarsk, Russia. She also won the silver medal in the women's 68 kg event at the 2019 European U23 Wrestling Championship held in Novi Sad, Serbia. In the same year, Velieva represented Russia at the Military World Games held in Wuhan, China and she won one of the bronze medals in the 68 kg event.

At the Golden Grand Prix Ivan Yarygin 2020, Velieva won the gold medal in the women's 68 kg event. At the 2020 European Wrestling Championships held in Rome, Italy, she won the gold medal in the 68 kg event. In the final, she defeated Dalma Caneva of Italy. In that same year, Velieva also won one of the bronze medals in the women's 68 kg event at the Individual Wrestling World Cup held in Belgrade, Serbia.

In March 2021, Velieva qualified at the European Qualification Tournament to compete at the 2020 Summer Olympics in Tokyo, Japan. A month later, she won the silver medal in the 68 kg event at the 2021 European Wrestling Championships held in Warsaw, Poland.

Velieva competed in the women's 68 kg event at the 2020 Summer Olympics where she won her first match against Danielle Lappage of Canada and she was then eliminated in her second match by Soronzonboldyn Battsetseg of Mongolia. Two months after the Olympics, she won one of the bronze medals in the women's 68 kg event at the 2021 World Wrestling Championships in Oslo, Norway. In her bronze medal match she defeated Olivia Di Bacco of Canada.

In January 2022, Velieva won the gold medal in the women's 68 kg event at the Golden Grand Prix Ivan Yarygin held in Krasnoyarsk, Russia. In February 2022, she won one of the bronze medals in the women's 68 kg event at the Yasar Dogu Tournament held in Istanbul, Turkey.

In April 2024, she competed at the European Wrestling Olympic Qualification Tournament in Baku, Azerbaijan and she earned a quota place for the Individual Neutral Athletes for the 2024 Summer Olympics in Paris, France. In July 2024, the Russian Wrestling Federation announced that Russian wrestlers would not take part after a unanimous decision to refuse to participate.

== Achievements ==
Year	Tournament	Location	Result	Event
2019	Military World Games	Wuhan, China	3rd	Freestyle 68 kg
2020	European Championships	Rome, Italy	1st	Freestyle 68 kg
2021	European Championships	Warsaw, Poland	2nd	Freestyle 68 kg
2021	World Championships	Oslo, Norway	3rd	Freestyle 68 kg
