= Meerim Zhumanazarova =

Kyrgyzstani freestyle wrestler

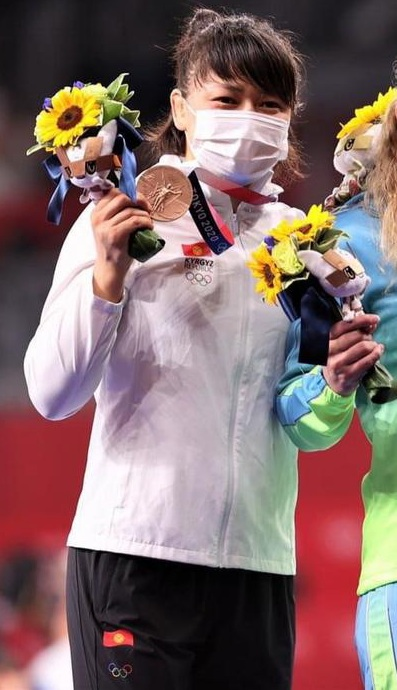
- Zhumanazarova at the 2020 Summer Olympics

Personal information
- Nationality: Kyrgyzstani
- Born: 9 November 1999 (age 27) Bishkek, Kyrgyzstan
- Height: 167 cm (5 ft 6 in)

Sport
- Country: Kyrgyzstan
- Sport: Amateur wrestling
- Weight class: 68 kg
- Event: Freestyle
Medal record
Women's freestyle wrestling
Representing Kyrgyzstan
Olympic Games
Silver medal – second place	2024 Paris	68 kg
Bronze medal – third place	2020 Tokyo	68 kg
World Championships
Gold medal – first place	2021 Oslo	68 kg
Silver medal – second place	2026 Astana	68 kg
Asian Championships
Gold medal – first place	2021 Almaty	68 kg
Gold medal – first place	2026 Bishkek	68 kg
Silver medal – second place	2022 Ulaanbaatar	68 kg
Bronze medal – third place	2018 Bishkek	68 kg
Bronze medal – third place	2019 Xi'an	68 kg
Individual World Cup
Gold medal – first place	2020 Belgrade	68 kg
Asian Games
Bronze medal – third place	2018 Jakarta	68 kg
Bronze medal – third place	2026 Aichi–Nagoya	68 kg
Islamic Solidarity Games
Gold medal – first place	2021 Konya	68 kg
Gold medal – first place	2025 Riyadh	68 kg
Asian Indoor Games
Bronze medal – third place	2017 Ashgabat	69 kg
Yasar Dogu Tournament
Silver medal – second place	2022 Istanbul	68 kg
Grand Prix
Gold medal – first place	2021 Kiev	68 kg
Gold medal – first place	2020 Warsaw	68 kg
Silver medal – second place	2026 Tirana	68 kg
Bronze medal – third place	2021 Warsaw	68 kg
Bronze medal – third place	2023 Bishkek	68 kg
Bronze medal – third place	2023 Alexandria	68 kg
World Juniors Championships
Silver medal – second place	2019 Tallinn	68 kg
Bronze medal – third place	2017 Tampere	67 kg

Meerim Zhumanazarova (Kyrgyz: Мээрим Жуманазарова; born 9 November 1999) is a Kyrgyzstani freestyle wrestler. She won the bronze medal in the women's 68 kg event at the 2020 Tokyo Olympics, and the gold medal in the same event at the 2021 World Wrestling Championships. In the 2024 Paris Olympics, she was defeated by Amit Elor of the United States in the final and earned the silver medal.

== Career ==
=== 2018–20 ===
Zhumanazarova claimed a bronze medal in the women's 68 kg freestyle event during the 2018 Asian Games.

In 2020, Zhumanazarova won the gold medal in the women's 68 kg event at the Individual Wrestling World Cup held in Belgrade, Serbia. She qualified to represent Kyrgyzstan at the 2020 Summer Olympics in Tokyo, Japan.

=== 2021–23 ===
In June 2021, Zhumanazarova won one of the bronze medals in her event at the 2021 Poland Open held in Warsaw, Poland.

On 3 August 2021, Zhumanazarova won the bronze medal in the women's freestyle 68 kg at the 2020 Summer Olympics.

In 2022, Zhumanazarova won the silver medal in the 68 kg event at the Yasar Dogu Tournament held in Istanbul, Turkey. She also won the silver medal in her event at the 2022 Asian Wrestling Championships held in Ulaanbaatar, Mongolia. She won the gold medal in the 68 kg event at the 2021 Islamic Solidarity Games held in Konya, Turkey. She competed in the 68 kg event at the 2022 World Wrestling Championships held in Belgrade, Serbia.

She won one of the bronze medals in her event at the 2023 Ibrahim Moustafa Tournament held in Alexandria, Egypt. In September 2023, she competed in the women's 68 kg event at the 2023 World Wrestling Championships held in Belgrade, Serbia.

=== 2024–present ===
Zhumanazarova competed at the 2024 Asian Wrestling Olympic Qualification Tournament in Bishkek, Kyrgyzstan, and earned a quota place for Kyrgyzstan for the 2024 Summer Olympics in Paris, France.

At the 2024 Paris Olympics, she won her first three matches by a combined score of 19–10, then was defeated by Amit Elor of the United States 3–0 in the final, winning the silver medal.

== Honors ==
She holds the title of Master of Sport of International Class in Kyrgyzstan.
