= Anastasia Bratchikova =

Russian freestyle wrestler

Anastasia Viktorovna Bratchikova Анастасия Викторовна Братчикова
Personal information
- Nationality: (Russia) Russian
- Born: February 21, 1989 (age 37) Yegorevsk, Moscow Oblast, Russian SFSR, Soviet Union
- Height: 163 cm (5 ft 4 in)
- Weight: 63 kg (139 lb) - 69 kg

Sport
- Country: Russia
- Sport: Wrestling
- Rank: Master of Sport in Freestyle wrestling
- Event: Freestyle wrestling
- Club: Moscow State Wrestling Club
- Coached by: O.U. Chernov
Medal record
Women's Freestyle Wrestling
Representing Russia
European Games
Silver medal – second place	2019 Minsk	68 kg
European Championships
Gold medal – first place	2018 Kaspiysk	68 kg
Gold medal – first place	2017 Novi Sad	69 kg
Russian Championships
Gold medal – first place	2010 Perm	–63 kg
Gold medal – first place	2012 Orekhovo-Zuyevo	–63 kg
Gold medal – first place	2018 Smolensk	–68 kg
Silver medal – second place	2011 Ulan-Ude	–63 kg
Silver medal – second place	2014 Novocheboksarsk	–69 kg
Silver medal – second place	2016 St. Petersburg	–63 kg
Bronze medal – third place	2013 St. Petersburg	–63 kg
Bronze medal – third place	2017 Kaspiysk	–69 kg

Anastasia Viktorovna Bratchikova (Russian: Анастасия Викторовна Братчикова; born 21 February 1989) is a Russian female freestyle wrestler who currently competes in the 68 kg weight category. Bratchikova is a three-time National champion with her latest national title being captured in Smolensk in August 2018. Bratchikova is also a two-time European champion, having won gold in Novi Sad in 2017 and in Kaspiysk in 2018.

== Sports career ==
=== Nationals ===
Bratchikova started her wrestling career in 2010, where she won gold at the Russian nationals for the first time. She then alternated medals through the years, winning two bronze medals, three silver medals and three gold medals, with the latest addition being in August 2018, where she defeated Yulia Maksimova in the finals to reclaim her national title.

=== European Championships ===
Bratchikova successfully gained admittance to the 2017 European Wrestling Championships in Novi Sad, Serbia. In the qualification round, Bratchikova successfully defeated French wrestler Koumba Larroque by 3-1, thus advancing to the quarterfinals where she defeated Sofiya Georgieva of Bulgaria by fall. In the semifinals, Bratchikova met Elis Manolova of Azerbaijan, defeating her 10-0 by technical superiority. In the final he met defending European champion and Olympic silver medalist Maryia Mamashuk of Belarus. With the score being 1-1 in the first period, Bratchikova won a passivity-point from Mamashuk, and then successfully executed a crotch-lift, making the score 3-1; shortly after, Mamashuk scored a takedown to even the score at 4-3. In the last 30 seconds, Bratchikova scored with a double leg; thus winning the final 6-3 and winning the gold medal, securing her first European title.

In 2018, Bratchikova entered the 2018 European Wrestling Championships in Kaspiysk, Dagestan. In Bratchkova's first match, in the round of 8, she faced rival Sofiya Georgieva and won the match by 7-0. In the quarterfinals she wrestled with Danutė Domikaitytė of Lithuania, winning 3-2 by the end. In the semifinals, Bratchikova defeated Austrian Martina Kuenz by a score of 8-1. In a largely scoreless match against Koumba Larroque, Bratchikova scored a takedown in the remaining 20 seconds, winning the match for gold by 3-1.
