= Adéla Hanzlíčková =

Czech freestyle wrestler

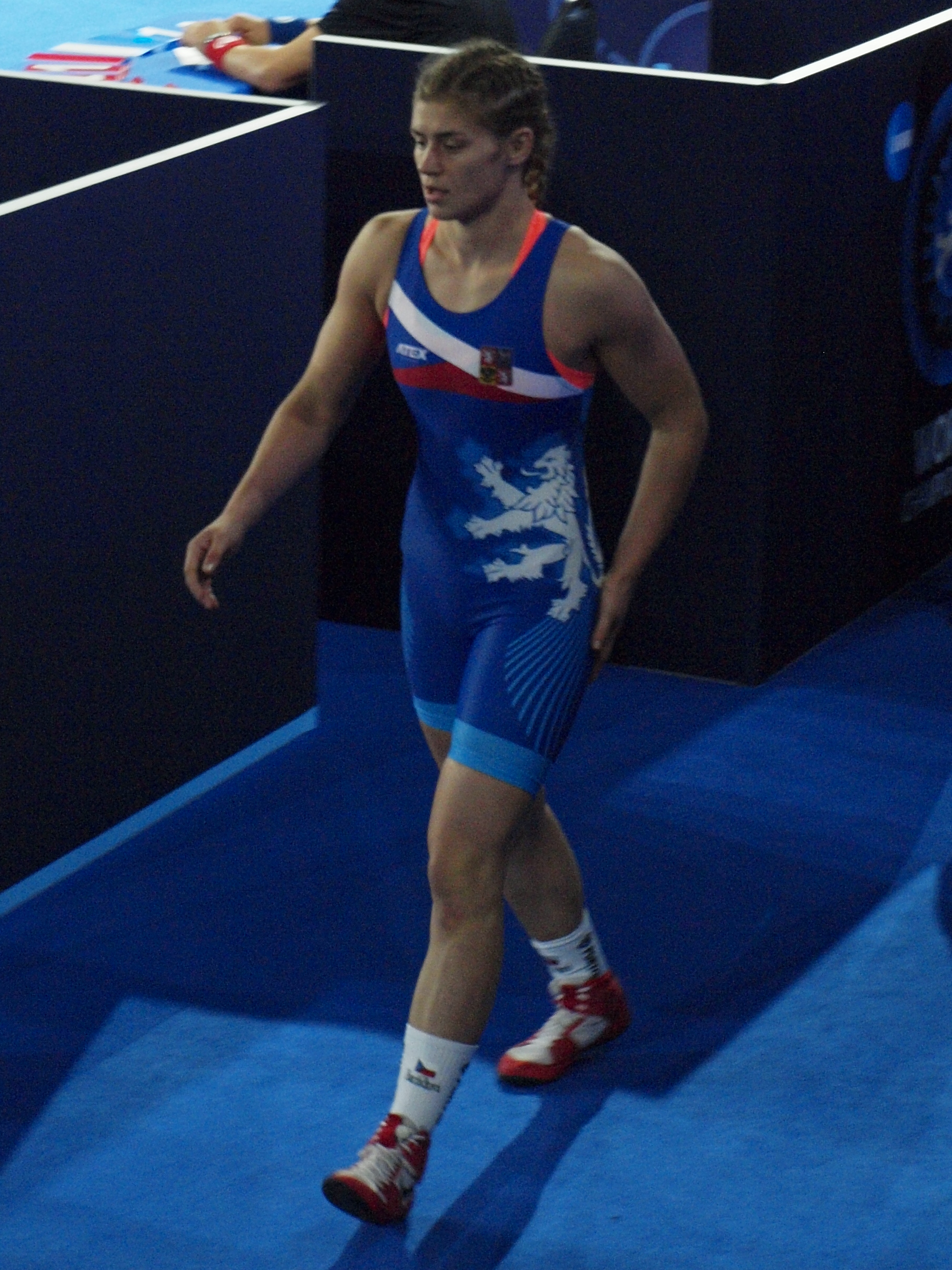
- Hanzlíčková at the 2021 World Wrestling Championships

Personal information
- Born: 4 May 1994 (age 32) Brno, Czech Republic
- Height: 1.72 m (5 ft 8 in)
- Weight: 68 kg (150 lb; 10.7 st)

Sport
- Country: Czech Republic
- Sport: Women's freestyle wrestling
- Event: 68 kg
- Club: Brno TAK Hellas
- Coached by: Milan Hemza
Medal record
Women's freestyle wrestling
Representing Czech Republic
World Championships
Bronze medal – third place	2024 Tirana	72 kg
Bronze medal – third place	2026 Astana	68 kg
European Championships
Silver medal – second place	2019 Bucharest	68 kg
Bronze medal – third place	2021 Warsaw	68 kg
Bronze medal – third place	2024 Bucharest	68 kg
Bronze medal – third place	2025 Bratislava	68 kg
Individual World Cup
Silver medal – second place	2020 Belgrade	68 kg
Yasar Dogu Tournament
Gold medal – first place	2020 Istanbul	68 kg
Bronze medal – third place	2022 Istanbul	68 kg
Dan Kolov - Nikola Petrov Tournament
Gold medal – first place	2018 Sofia	65 kg
Bronze medal – third place	2019 Ruse	68 kg
Grand Prix
Gold medal – first place	2018 Wolfurt	68 kg
Gold medal – first place	2019 Wolfurt	68 kg
Gold medal – first place	2023 Warsaw	68 kg
Gold medal – first place	2024 Madrid	68 kg
Gold medal – first place	2025 Nice	68 kg
Silver medal – second place	2018 Madrid	65 kg
Silver medal – second place	2023 Zagreb	68 kg
Silver medal – second place	2025 Zagreb	68 kg
Bronze medal – third place	2014 Dormagen	63 kg
Bronze medal – third place	2015 Warsaw	63 kg
Bronze medal – third place	2016 Paris	63 kg
Bronze medal – third place	2018 Kyiv	65 kg
World U23 Championships
Bronze medal – third place	2017 Bydgoszcz	63 kg
European U23 Championship
Silver medal – second place	2016 Russe	63 kg
Silver medal – second place	2017 Szombathely	63 kg
Bronze medal – third place	2015 Wałbrzych	63 kg
European Juniors Championships
Bronze medal – third place	2014 Katowice	63 kg
European Cadets Championships
Bronze medal – third place	2010 Sarajevo	52 kg

Adéla Hanzlíčková (born 4 May 1994) is a Czech freestyle wrestler competing in the 68 kg division.

== Wrestling career ==
Hanzlíčková competed in the women's freestyle 63 kg event at the 2016 Summer Olympics, in which she was eliminated in the round of 16 by Henna Johansson.

In 2020, Hanzlíčková won the silver medal in the women's 68 kg event at the Individual Wrestling World Cup held in Belgrade, Serbia. In March 2021, she competed at the European Qualification Tournament in Budapest, Hungary hoping to qualify for the 2020 Summer Olympics in Tokyo, Japan. Hanzlíčková did not qualify at this tournament and she also failed to qualify for the Olympics at the World Olympic Qualification Tournament held in Sofia, Bulgaria. In October 2021, she lost her bronze medal match in the 68 kg event at the World Wrestling Championships held in Oslo, Norway.

In 2022, she won one of the bronze medals in the 68 kg event at the Yasar Dogu Tournament held in Istanbul, Turkey. She lost her bronze medal match in the 68 kg event at the 2022 European Wrestling Championships held in Budapest, Hungary. She competed in the 68 kg event at the 2022 World Wrestling Championships held in Belgrade, Serbia.

Hanzlíčková won the silver medal in the women's 68 kg event at the 2023 Grand Prix Zagreb Open held in Zagreb, Croatia. She won one of the bronze medals in the women's 68 kg event at the 2024 European Wrestling Championships held in Bucharest, Romania. Hanzlíčková competed at the 2024 European Wrestling Olympic Qualification Tournament in Baku, Azerbaijan hoping to qualify for the 2024 Summer Olympics in Paris, France. She was eliminated in her second match and she did not qualify for the Olympics. Hanzlíčková also competed at the 2024 World Wrestling Olympic Qualification Tournament held in Istanbul, Turkey without qualifying for the Olympics.

== Achievements ==
Year	Tournament	Location	Result	Event
2019	European Championships	Bucharest, Romania	2nd	Freestyle 68 kg
2020	World Cup	Belgrade, Serbia	2nd	Freestyle 68 kg
2021	European Championships	Warsaw, Poland	3rd	Freestyle 68 kg
2024	European Championships	Bucharest, Romania	3rd	Freestyle 68 kg
2024	World Championships	Tirana, Albania	3rd	Freestyle 72 kg
2025	European Championships	Bratislava, Slovakia	3rd	Freestyle 68 kg
