= Enkhsaikhany Delgermaa =

Mongolian freestyle wrestler

Personal information
- Born: 1 June 1999 (age 27) Övörkhangai, Mongolia
- Height: 1.66 m (5 ft 5 in)
- Weight: 68 kg (150 lb)

Sport
- Country: Mongolia
- Sport: Women's freestyle wrestling
- Event: 68 kg
Medal record
Women's freestyle wrestling
Representing Mongolia
World Championships
Silver medal – second place	2023 Belgrade	68 kg
Asian Championships
Silver medal – second place	2021 Almaty	68 kg
Bronze medal – third place	2020 New Delhi	68 kg
Bronze medal – third place	2022 Ulaanbaatar	68 kg
Bronze medal – third place	2024 Bishkek	68 kg
Bronze medal – third place	2025 Amman	68 kg
Bronze medal – third place	2026 Bishkek	68 kg
Asian Games
Bronze medal – third place	2022 Hangzhou	68 kg
Yasar Dogu Tournament
Gold medal – first place	2024 Antalya	68 kg
Grand Prix
Bronze medal – third place	2022 Almaty	68 kg
World U23 Championships
Silver medal – second place	2021 Belgrade	68 kg
World Juniors Championships
Silver medal – second place	2018 Trnava	65 kg
Asian U23 Championship
Silver medal – second place	2019 Ulaan Baatar	68 kg
Asian Juniors Championships
Bronze medal – third place	2016 Manila	63 kg
Bronze medal – third place	2018 New Delhi	65 kg
Asian Cadets Championships
Silver medal – second place	2016 Taichung	63 kg

Enkhsaikhany Delgermaa (Mongolian: Энхсайханы Дэлгэрмаа, born 1 June 1999), also known as Delgermaa Enkhsaikhan, is a Mongolian freestyle wrestler competing in the 68 kg division.

== Career ==
Bronze medalist at the 2022 Asian Games. silver medalist at the 2021 Asian Championships and bronze medalist in 2020 and 2022. fourth at the 2019 World Cup. third at the 2021 U-23 World Cup. runner-up at the 2019 U-23 Asian Championships. second at the 2018 Junior World Cup. third at the 2016 and 2018 Asian Junior Championships. runner-up at the 2016 Asian Cadet Championships.

In 2023, she competed in the women's 68 kg event at the World Wrestling Championships held in Belgrade, Serbia and won the silver medal. As a result, she earned a quota place for Mongolia at the 2024 Summer Olympics in Paris, France. She competed in the women's 68 kg event at the Olympics.

In March 2024, she won the Yaşar Dogu international tournament in Antalya.

== Achievements ==
Year	Tournament	Location	Result	Event
2024	Asian Championships	Bishkek, Kyrgyzstan	3rd	Freestyle 68 kg
2023	World Championships	Belgrade, Serbia	2nd	Freestyle 68 kg
2022	Asian Games	Hangzhou, China	3rd	Freestyle 68 kg
2022	Asian Championships	Ulaanbaatar, Mongolia	3rd	Freestyle 68 kg
2021	Asian Championships	Almaty, Kazakhstan	2nd	Freestyle 68 kg
2020	Asian Championships	New Delhi, India	3rd	Freestyle 68 kg
