= Sofiya Georgieva =

Bulgarian freestyle wrestler

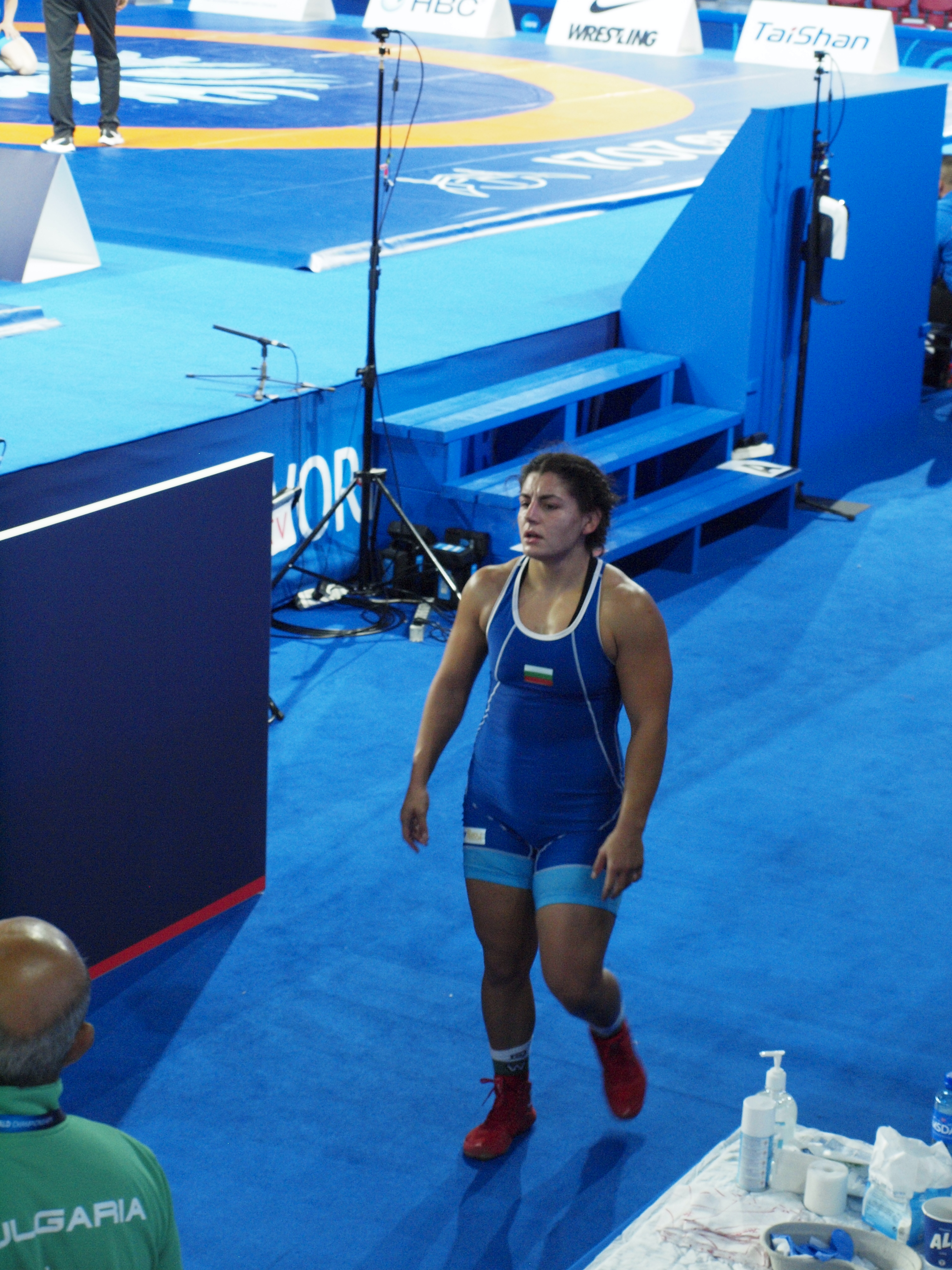
- Sofiya Georgieva at the 2021 World Wrestling Championships in Oslo, Norway

Personal information
- Native name: София Христова Георгиева
- Full name: Sofiya Hristova Georgieva
- Born: 20 September 1995 (age 30)
- Height: 163 cm (5 ft 4 in)

Sport
- Country: Bulgaria
- Sport: Amateur wrestling
- Weight class: 68 kg
- Event: Freestyle
- Club: CSKA Sofia
Medal record
Women's freestyle wrestling
Representing Bulgaria
European Games
Bronze medal – third place	2019 Minsk	68 kg
European U23 Championship
Silver medal – second place	2018 Istanbul	65 kg

Sofiya Hristova Georgieva (born 20 September 1995) is a Bulgarian freestyle wrestler. She is a bronze medalist at the European Games.

== Career ==
At the 2018 European U23 Wrestling Championship held in Istanbul, Turkey, she won the silver medal in the 65 kg event. In 2019, she represented Bulgaria at the European Games in Minsk, Belarus and she won one of the bronze medals in the 68 kg event.

In March 2021, Georgieva won one of the bronze medals in the 68 kg event at the Matteo Pellicone Ranking Series 2021 held in Rome, Italy. In April 2021, she was eliminated in her second match in the 65 kg event at the European Wrestling Championships in Warsaw, Poland. In October 2021, she was eliminated in her first match in the 72 kg event at the World Wrestling Championships held in Oslo, Norway.

In 2022, Georgieva won one of the bronze medals in the 65 kg event at the Dan Kolov & Nikola Petrov Tournament held in Veliko Tarnovo, Bulgaria. She also competed at the Yasar Dogu Tournament held in Istanbul, Turkey. In April 2022, she lost her bronze medal match in the 65 kg event at the European Wrestling Championships held in Budapest, Hungary. She competed in the 68 kg event at the 2022 World Wrestling Championships held in Belgrade, Serbia.

== Achievements ==
Year	Tournament	Location	Result	Event
2019	European Games	Minsk, Belarus	3rd	Freestyle 68 kg
