= Danutė Domikaitytė =

Lithuanian freestyle wrestler

Sport
- Country: Lithuania
- Sport: Amateur wrestling
- Weight class: 68 kg
- Event: Freestyle
Medal record
Women's freestyle wrestling
Representing Lithuania
European Championships
Bronze medal – third place	2020 Rome	68 kg
Yasar Dogu Tournament
Silver medal – second place	2018 Istanbul	68 kg
Bronze medal – third place	2022 Istanbul	72 kg
World U23 Championships
Bronze medal – third place	2017 Bydgoszcz	69 kg

Danutė Domikaitytė is a Lithuanian freestyle wrestler. She won one of the bronze medals in the 68 kg event at the 2020 European Wrestling Championships held in Rome, Italy.

== Career ==
In 2018, Domikaitytė competed in the women's 68 kg event at the Klippan Lady Open in Klippan, Sweden. In March 2021, she competed at the European Qualification Tournament in Budapest, Hungary hoping to qualify for the 2020 Summer Olympics in Tokyo, Japan. Domikaitytė did not qualify at this tournament and she also failed to qualify for the Olympics at the World Olympic Qualification Tournament held in Sofia, Bulgaria. In October 2021, she competed in the 68 kg event at the World Wrestling Championships held in Oslo, Norway.

In 2022, Domikaitytė won one of the bronze medals in the women's 72 kg event at the Yasar Dogu Tournament held in Istanbul, Turkey. She competed in the 68 kg event at the 2022 World Wrestling Championships held in Belgrade, Serbia.

In September 2023, Domikaitytė competed in the women's 68 kg event at the 2023 World Wrestling Championships held in Belgrade, Serbia. She competed at the 2024 European Wrestling Olympic Qualification Tournament in Baku, Azerbaijan hoping to qualify for the 2024 Summer Olympics in Paris, France. She was eliminated in her first match and she did not qualify for the Olympics. Domikaitytė also competed at the 2024 World Wrestling Olympic Qualification Tournament held in Istanbul, Turkey without qualifying for the Olympics. She was eliminated in her first match.

== Achievements ==
Year	Tournament	Location	Result	Event
2020	European Championships	Rome, Italy	3rd	Freestyle 68 kg
