= 2015 World Wrestling Championships – Women's freestyle 69 kg =

Women's freestyle 69 kg at the 2015 World Championships
- Venue: Orleans Arena
- Dates: 9 September 2015
- Competitors: 32 from 32 nations

Medalists
| gold medal | Natalia Vorobieva | Russia |
| silver medal | Zhou Feng | China |
| bronze medal | Sara Dosho | Japan |
| bronze medal | Aline Focken | Germany |

The women's freestyle 69 kilograms is a competition featured at the 2015 World Wrestling Championships, and was held in Las Vegas, United States on 9 September 2015.

This freestyle wrestling competition consisted of a single-elimination tournament, with a repechage used to determine the winners of two bronze medals.

== Results ==
Legend

- F — Won by fall

=== Final ===
| Final |
| Zhou Feng (CHN) | 2 |
| Natalia Vorobieva (RUS) | 2^{F} |

=== Top half ===
Round of 32
Krystsina Fedarashka (BLR) | 0
Sara Dosho (JPN) | 8^{F}
Navjot Kaur (IND) | 0
Alina Stadnyk (UKR) | 8
Zhou Feng (CHN) | 12
Martina Kuenz (AUT) | 7
Sofiya Georgieva (BUL) | 1
Danutė Domikaitytė (LTU) | 8^{F}
Agnieszka Wieszczek (POL) | 9
Dorothy Yeats (CAN) | 4
Vanessa Wilson (HUN) | 0
Ochirbatyn Nasanburmaa (MGL) | 13^{F}
Dalma Caneva (ITA) | 6
Ilana Kratysh (ISR) | 8
Elis Manolova (AZE) | 3
Elmira Syzdykova (KAZ) | 4^{F}

Round of 16
Sara Dosho (JPN) | 8
Alina Stadnyk (UKR) | 6
Zhou Feng (CHN) | 10
Danutė Domikaitytė (LTU) | 0
Agnieszka Wieszczek (POL) | 6
Ochirbatyn Nasanburmaa (MGL) | 10
Ilana Kratysh (ISR) | 8
Elmira Syzdykova (KAZ) | 9

Quarterfinals
Sara Dosho (JPN) | 7
Zhou Feng (CHN) | 11
Ochirbatyn Nasanburmaa (MGL) | 8
Elmira Syzdykova (KAZ) | 6

Semifinals
Zhou Feng (CHN) | 14
Ochirbatyn Nasanburmaa (MGL) | 4

=== Bottom half ===
Round of 32
Aline Focken (GER) | 4^{F}
Diana Miranda (MEX) | 0
Sinem Topçu (TUR) | 3
Leidy Izquierdo (COL) | 5
Gilda Oliveira (BRA) | 3
Dayanara Rivera (PUR) | 7
Yanny Gajardo (CHI) | 0
Enas Mostafa (EGY) | 10
Elena Pirozhkova (USA) | 4^{F}
Ilania Keju (MHL) | 0
María Acosta (VEN) | 0
Jenny Fransson (SWE) | 10
Cynthia Vescan (FRA) | 4
Jeong Eun-sun (KOR) | 5
Natalia Vorobieva (RUS) | 2^{F}
Chen Wen-ling (TPE) | 0

Round of 16
Aline Focken (GER) | 7
Leidy Izquierdo (COL) | 0
Dayanara Rivera (PUR) | 0
Enas Mostafa (EGY) | 10
Elena Pirozhkova (USA) | 3
Jenny Fransson (SWE) | 5
Jeong Eun-sun (KOR) | 0
Natalia Vorobieva (RUS) | 2^{F}

Quarterfinals
Aline Focken (GER) | 6^{F}
Enas Mostafa (EGY) | 0
Jenny Fransson (SWE) | 4
Natalia Vorobieva (RUS) | 7

Semifinals
Aline Focken (GER) | 0
Natalia Vorobieva (RUS) | 4^{F}

=== Repechage ===
Repechage round 1
Martina Kuenz (AUT) | 6^{F}
Danutė Domikaitytė (LTU) | 0
Chen Wen-ling (TPE) | 5
Jeong Eun-sun (KOR) | 6

Repechage round 2
Martina Kuenz (AUT) | 10
Sara Dosho (JPN) | 12
Jeong Eun-sun (KOR) | 0
Jenny Fransson (SWE) | 2^{F}

Bronze medals
Sara Dosho (JPN) | 6
Ochirbatyn Nasanburmaa (MGL) | 5
Jenny Fransson (SWE) | 5
Aline Focken (GER) | 6
