= Egypt at the 2016 Summer Olympics =

- IOC code: EGY
- NOC: Egyptian Olympic Committee
- Website: www.egyptianolympic.org (in Arabic and English)

in Rio de Janeiro
- Competitors: 120 in 22 sports
- Flag bearers: Ahmed El-Ahmar (opening); Hedaya Malak (closing)
- Medals Ranked 75th: Gold 0 Silver 0 Bronze 3 Total 3

Summer Olympics appearances (overview)
- 1912; 1920; 1924; 1928; 1932; 1936; 1948; 1952; 1956; 1960–1964; 1968; 1972; 1976; 1980; 1984; 1988; 1992; 1996; 2000; 2004; 2008; 2012; 2016; 2020; 2024; 2028

Other related appearances
- 1906 Intercalated Games –––– United Arab Republic (1960, 1964)

Egypt competed at the 2016 Summer Olympics in Rio de Janeiro, Brazil, from 5 to 21 August 2016. Since the nation's debut in 1912, Egyptian athletes had appeared in every edition of the Summer Olympic Games except the 1932 and 1980 editions, joining the United States-led boycott in the latter.

The Egyptian Olympic Committee sent its largest ever delegation to the Games, with a total of 120 athletes, 83 men and 37 women, competing across 22 sports. The Egyptian roster also witnessed more women participating at the Games than those who attended in London four years earlier, breaking its previous record by just a small fraction.

Egypt returned home from Rio de Janeiro with three bronze medals. Moreover, these Games marked the first time Egyptian women ascended the Olympic podium in the nation's 104-year history. These medals were distributed to taekwondo fighter Hedaya Malak (women's 57 kg), as well as weightlifters Mohamed Ihab and former Youth Olympian Sara Samir, who accomplished a historic feat as the first Arab woman to accept an Olympic medal in her sport.

In addition to the success and historic firsts of the bronze medalists, several Egyptian athletes reached the finals of their respective events, but narrowly missed out on the podium. Among them were shooting team Afaf El-Hodhod (fifth, women's air pistol), freestyle wrestler Enas Mostafa (fifth, women's 69 kg), and three others in weightlifting, namely Shaimaa Khalaf (fourth, women's +75 kg), Ahmed Saad (fifth, men's 62 kg), and Ragab Abdelhay (fifth, men's 94 kg).

== Medalists ==
The following Egyptian athletes won medals at the Games. In the discipline sections below, medalists' names are bolded.

Medal	Name	Sport	Event	Date
Bronze	Mohamed Ihab	Weightlifting	Men's 77 kg	10 August
Bronze	Sara Samir	Weightlifting	Women's 69 kg	10 August
Bronze	Hedaya Malak	Taekwondo	Women's 57 kg	18 August

Medals by sport
**Sport**	1st place, gold medalist(s)	2nd place, silver medalist(s)	3rd place, bronze medalist(s)	**Total**
Weightlifting	0	0	2	2
Taekwondo	0	0	1	1
Total	0	0	3	3

== Competitors ==
The Egyptian Olympic Committee (EOC) confirmed a roster of 120 athletes, 83 men and 37 women, to compete across 22 sports at the Games. It was the nation's largest ever delegation sent to the Olympics, breaking its previous record of 110 athletes set in 2012. These Games also witnessed more Egyptian women participating than those who attended in London four years earlier, constituting about 30 percent of the overall squad.

Handball and volleyball (both played exclusively by men) were the only collective sports in which Egypt qualified for the Games, having both returned to the Olympic scene after their absence from London 2012. Egypt's women's synchronized swimming and women's table tennis teams, however, participated for their third-straight and second-straight Games, respectively. For individual-based sports, Egypt marked its Olympic debut in women's beach volleyball, as well as its return to cycling after 16 years and diving after 32 years. Shooting accounted for the largest number of athletes on the Egyptian team, with 12 entries. There was a single competitor each in track cycling, equestrian jumping, artistic gymnastics, and sailing.

Of the 120 participants, twenty-eight of them returned to compete again, with the rest of the field attending their maiden Games in Rio de Janeiro. Among the returnees were foil fencer Alaaeldin Abouelkassem, who became the first from an African nation to win an Olympic medal in his sport; and heavyweight judoka Islam El Shehaby, who headed the roster as the lone Egyptian competitor going to his fourth straight Games. Eight Egyptian athletes competed at the 2014 Summer Youth Olympics in Nanjing before their senior Olympic debut, including weightlifter Sara Samir, modern pentathlete Haydy Morsy, distance swimmer Ahmed Akram, and shooters Afaf El-Hodhod (pistol) and Hadir Mekhimar (rifle).

Other notable athletes on the Egyptian roster featured modern pentathlon veteran Amro El-Geziry and his younger brother Omar, world-ranked taekwondo fighter Hedaya Malak, American-born swimming sprinter Farida Osman, and 2014 world bronze medalist Azmy Mehelba in men's skeet shooting. 16-year-old Morsy was Egypt's youngest competitor, with volleyball team captain Ashraf Abouelhassan rounding out the field as the oldest member (aged 41). Handball star and three-time Olympian Ahmed El-Ahmar was selected by EOC to lead the Egyptian squad as the flag bearer in the opening ceremony.

The following is the list of number of competitors participating in the Games. Note that reserves in fencing, field hockey, football, and handball are not counted as athletes:

Sport	Men	Women	Total
Archery	1	1	2
Athletics	3	1	4
Boxing	4	0	4
Canoeing	1	1	2
Cycling	0	1	1
Diving	2	2	4
Equestrian	1	0	1
Fencing	5	2	7
Gymnastics	0	1	1
Handball	14	0	14
Judo	5	0	5
Modern pentathlon	2	1	3
Rowing	1	1	2
Sailing	1	0	1
Shooting	9	3	12
Swimming	5	2	7
Synchronized swimming	—	9	9
Table tennis	2	3	5
Taekwondo	1	2	3
Volleyball	12	2	14
Weightlifting	6	3	9
Wrestling	8	2	10
Total	83	37	120

== Archery ==
Two Egyptian archers qualified each for both the men's and women's individual recurve by obtaining one of the three Olympic places available from the 2016 African Archery Championships in Windhoek, Namibia.

Athlete	Event	Ranking round		Round of 64	Round of 32	Round of 16	Quarterfinals	Semifinals	Final / BM	
Athlete	Event	Score	Seed	Opposition Score	Opposition Score	Opposition Score	Opposition Score	Opposition Score	Opposition Score	Rank
Ahmed El-Nemr	Men's individual	644	51	Worth (AUS); **L** 0–6	Did not advance					
Reem Mansour	Women's individual	596	56	Lin S-c (TPE); **L** 0–6	Did not advance					

== Athletics (track and field) ==
Egyptian athletes have so far achieved qualifying standards in the following athletics events (up to a maximum of 3 athletes in each event):

Key

- Note–Ranks given for track events are within the athlete's heat only
- **Q** = Qualified for the next round
- **q** = Qualified for the next round as a fastest loser or, in field events, by position without achieving the qualifying target
- **NR** = National record
- N/A = Round not applicable for the event
- Bye = Athlete not required to compete in round

Track & road events

Athlete	Event	Heat		Semifinal		Final	
Athlete	Event	Result	Rank	Result	Rank	Result	Rank
Anas Beshr	Men's 400 m	DSQ		Did not advance			
Hamada Mohamed	Men's 800 m	1:46.65	4 **q**	1:48.17	8	Did not advance	
Fatma El-Shernoubi	Women's 800 m	2:21.24	8	Did not advance			

Field events

Athlete	Event	Qualification		Final	
Athlete	Event	Distance	Position	Distance	Position
Mohamed Mahmoud Hassan	Men's hammer throw	69.87	26	Did not advance	

== Boxing ==
Egypt entered four boxers to compete in the following weight classes in the Olympic boxing tournament. Hosam Abdin was the only Egyptian boxer qualifying through the 2015 World Championships, while three further boxers (Abdelaal, Mohamed, and Salah) had claimed their Olympic spots at the 2016 African Qualification Tournament in Yaoundé, Cameroon.

Athlete	Event	Round of 32	Round of 16	Quarterfinals	Semifinals	Final	
Athlete	Event	Opposition Result	Opposition Result	Opposition Result	Opposition Result	Opposition Result	Rank
Mahmoud Abdelaal	Men's lightweight	Benbaziz (ALG); **L** 0–3	Did not advance				
Walid Sedik Mohamed	Men's welterweight	Kelly (GBR); **L** 0–3	Did not advance				
Hosam Abdin	Men's middleweight	Clair (MRI); **W** 3–0	Ntsengue (CMR); **W** 3–0	Rodríguez (MEX); **L** 0–3	Did not advance		
Abdelrahman Salah	Men's light heavyweight	Sep (CRO); **L** 1–2	Did not advance				

== Canoeing ==
=== Sprint ===
Egypt qualified two boats for the following distances into the Olympic canoeing regatta through the 2016 African Sprint Qualifying Tournament.

Athlete	Event	Heats		Semifinals		Final	
Athlete	Event	Time	Rank	Time	Rank	Time	Rank
Karim Elsayed	Men's K-1 200 m	37.294	7	Did not advance			
Menatalla Karim	Women's K-1 200 m	49.596	7	Did not advance			

Qualification Legend: FA = Qualify to final (medal); FB = Qualify to final B (non-medal)

== Cycling ==
=== Track ===
Following the completion of the 2016 UCI Track Cycling World Championships, Egypt entered one rider to compete only in the women's sprint at the Olympics for the first time, by virtue of her final individual UCI Olympic ranking in that event. This signified the nation's Olympic comeback to the sport of cycling for the first time since 2000, and to track cycling since 1924.

Sprint

Athlete	Event	Qualification		Round 1	Repechage 1	Round 2	Repechage 2	Quarterfinals	Semifinals	Final	
Athlete	Event	Time Speed (km/h)	Rank	Opposition Time Speed (km/h)	Opposition Time Speed (km/h)	Opposition Time Speed (km/h)	Opposition Time Speed (km/h)	Opposition Time Speed (km/h)	Opposition Time Speed (km/h)	Opposition Time Speed (km/h)	Rank
Ebtissam Zayed	Women's sprint	12.920; 55.727	27	Did not advance							

== Diving ==
Egyptian divers qualified for the following individual spots at the 2016 Olympic Games by virtue of their top national finish from Africa at the 2015 FINA World Championships.

Athlete	Event	Preliminaries		Semifinals		Final	
Athlete	Event	Points	Rank	Points	Rank	Points	Rank
Youssef Ezzat	Men's 3 m springboard	360.95	25	Did not advance			
Mohab El-Kordy	Men's 10 m platform	305.50	28	Did not advance			
Maha Amer	Women's 3 m springboard	238.55	28	Did not advance			
Maha Gouda	Women's 10 m platform	276.15	24	Did not advance			

== Equestrian ==
Egypt entered one jumping rider into the Olympic equestrian competition by virtue of a top four finish outside the group selection in the individual FEI Olympic Rankings.

=== Jumping ===
Athlete	Horse	Event	Qualification								Final					Total	
Athlete	Horse	Event	Round 1		Round 2			Round 3			Round A		Round B			Total	
Athlete	Horse	Event	Penalties	Rank	Penalties	Total	Rank	Penalties	Total	Rank	Penalties	Rank	Penalties	Total	Rank	Penalties	Rank
Karim El-Zoghby	Amelia	Individual	0	=1 **Q**	9	9	=42 **Q**	9	18	=40	Did not advance						

== Fencing ==
Egyptian fencers have qualified a full squad each in the men's team foil by virtue of being the highest ranking team from Africa outside the world's top four in the FIE Olympic Team Rankings. Meanwhile, Mohamed Amer (men's sabre) and Noura Mohamed (women's foil) had claimed their Olympic spots on the Egyptian team as one of the two highest-ranked fencers from Africa outside the world's top 14 in the FIE Adjusted Official Rankings. Nada Hafez (women's sabre) and London 2012 épée fencer Ayman Fayez rounded out the roster by virtue of their top finish respectively at the African Zonal Qualifier in Algiers, Algeria.

Men

Athlete	Event	Round of 64	Round of 32	Round of 16	Quarterfinal	Semifinal	Final / BM	
Athlete	Event	Opposition Score	Opposition Score	Opposition Score	Opposition Score	Opposition Score	Opposition Score	Rank
Ayman Fayez	Épée	Bye	R Limardo (VEN); **W** 15–5	Grumier (FRA); **L** 9–15	Did not advance			
Alaaeldin Abouelkassem	Foil	Bye	Choupenitch (CZE); **W** 15–8	Garozzo (ITA); **L** 13–15	Did not advance			
Tarek Ayad	Foil	Bye	Garozzo (ITA); **L** 8–15	Did not advance				
Mohamed Essam	Foil	Marques (BRA); **W** 15–8	Massialas (USA); **L** 7–15	Did not advance				
Alaaeldin Abouelkassem; Tarek Ayad; Mohamed Essam	Team foil	—N/a			United States; **L** 37–45	Classification semifinal Great Britain; **L** 43–45	7th place final Brazil; **W** 45–39	7
Mohamed Amer	Sabre	—N/a	Gu B-g (KOR); **L** 9–15	Did not advance				

Women

Athlete	Event	Round of 64	Round of 32	Round of 16	Quarterfinal	Semifinal	Final / BM	
Athlete	Event	Opposition Score	Opposition Score	Opposition Score	Opposition Score	Opposition Score	Opposition Score	Rank
Noura Mohamed	Foil	Bye	Boubakri (TUN); **L** 4–15	Did not advance				
Nada Hafez	Sabre	Benítez (VEN); **L** 11–15	Did not advance					

== Gymnastics ==
=== Artistic ===
Egypt entered one artistic gymnast in the Olympic competition. London 2012 Olympian Sherine El-Zeiny received a spare berth freed up by South Africa as one of the highest-ranked gymnasts from Africa in the women's apparatus and all-around events, respectively, at the Olympic Test Event in Rio de Janeiro.

Women

Athlete	Event	Qualification						Final					
Athlete	Event	Apparatus				Total	Rank	Apparatus				Total	Rank
Athlete	Event	V	UB	BB	F	Total	Rank	V	UB	BB	F	Total	Rank
Sherine El-Zeiny	Floor	—N/a			12.533	12.533	69	Did not advance					

== Handball ==
Summary

Key:

- ET – After extra time
- P – Match decided by penalty-shootout.

Team	Event	Group Stage						Quarterfinal	Semifinal	Final / BM	
Team	Event	Opposition Score	Opposition Score	Opposition Score	Opposition Score	Opposition Score	Rank	Opposition Score	Opposition Score	Opposition Score	Rank
Egypt men's	Men's tournament	Slovenia; **L** 26–27	Sweden; **W** 26–25	Poland; **L** 25–33	Brazil; **D** 27–27	Germany; **L** 25–31	5	Did not advance			9

=== Men's tournament ===
Egypt men's handball team qualified for the Olympics by attaining a top finish and securing a lone outright berth at the 2016 African Championships in Cairo.

Team roster

The following is the Egyptian roster in the men's handball tournament of the 2016 Summer Olympics.

Head coach: Marwan Ragab

No.	Pos.	Name	Date of birth (age)	Height	App.	Goals	Club
3	RB	Mamdouh Abouebaid	1 January 1988 (aged 28)	1.87 m	131	397	(Egypt) Al Ahly
8	P	Mahmoud Ramadan	7 March 1984 (aged 32)	1.85 m	305	912	(Egypt) Al Ahly
9	CB	Eslam Isaa	2 July 1988 (aged 28)	1.86 m	204	617	(Tunisia) Club Africain
15	RW	Mohamed Amer	12 December 1987 (aged 28)	1.87 m	150	498	(Egypt) Al Ahly
19	CB	Mohamed El-Bassiouny	10 May 1990 (aged 26)	1.86 m	110	360	(Egypt) Alexandria SC
20	CB	Mohamed Hasehm	23 January 1988 (aged 28)	1.80 m	210	712	(Egypt) Aviation SC
24	P	Ibrahim El-Masry	11 March 1989 (aged 27)	1.95 m	175	423	(Egypt) Al Ahly
39	LB	Yehia El-Deraa	17 June 1995 (aged 21)	1.86 m	88	186	(Egypt) Hellopolice
66	RB	Ahmed El-Ahmar	27 January 1984 (aged 32)	1.84 m	397	1351	(Egypt) Zamalek
72	GK	Mahmoud Khalil	1 June 1991 (aged 25)	1.92 m	122	0	(Qatar) El Jaish
88	GK	Karim Handawy	1 May 1988 (aged 28)	1.86 m	256	0	(Egypt) Al Ahly
89	P	Mohamed Mamdouh Shebib	4 January 1989 (aged 27)	1.89 m	210	953	(Egypt) Zamalek
90	LB	Aly Mohamed	14 December 1990 (aged 25)	1.95 m	231	703	(United Arab Emirates) Al Jazira
91	RW	Mohamed Sanad	16 January 1991 (aged 25)	1.84 m	120	334	(Hungary) Komlói Bányász

Group play

Pos	Team	Pld	W	D	L	GF	GA	GD	Pts	Qualification
1	Germany	5	4	0	1	153	141	+12	8 (Note: Slovenia 25–28 Germany)	Quarter-finals
2	Slovenia	5	4	0	1	137	126	+11	8	Quarter-finals
3	Brazil (H)	5	2	1	2	141	150	−9	5	Quarter-finals
4	Poland	5	2	0	3	139	140	−1	4	Quarter-finals
5	Egypt	5	1	1	3	129	143	−14	3	
6	Sweden	5	1	0	4	132	131	+1	2	

Source: IHF
Rules for classification: 1) Points; 2) Head-to-head points; 3) Head-to-head goal difference; 4) Head-to-head goals scored; 5) Goal difference; 6) Goals scored; 7) Draw.
(H) Hosts
Notes:

7 August 2016; 21:50	**Slovenia**	**27–26**	**Egypt**	Future Arena, Rio de Janeiro; Referees: Pálsson, Elíasson (ISL)
7 August 2016; 21:50	Janc 8	(15–15)	El-Ahmar 7	Future Arena, Rio de Janeiro; Referees: Pálsson, Elíasson (ISL)
7 August 2016; 21:50	3× (yellow card) 9× (suspension)	Report	4× (yellow card) 5× (suspension) 1× (red card)	Future Arena, Rio de Janeiro; Referees: Pálsson, Elíasson (ISL)

9 August 2016; 19:50	**Egypt**	**26–25**	**Sweden**	Future Arena, Rio de Janeiro; Referees: Mousaviyan, Kolahdouzan (IRI)
9 August 2016; 19:50	Sanad 7	(12–13)	Petersen 5	Future Arena, Rio de Janeiro; Referees: Mousaviyan, Kolahdouzan (IRI)
9 August 2016; 19:50	4× (yellow card) 7× (suspension)	Report	3× (yellow card) 8× (suspension)	Future Arena, Rio de Janeiro; Referees: Mousaviyan, Kolahdouzan (IRI)

11 August 2016; 11:30	**Poland**	**33–25**	**Egypt**	Future Arena, Rio de Janeiro; Referees: Santos, Fonseca (POR)
11 August 2016; 11:30	Daszek 6	(16–10)	Eissa 6	Future Arena, Rio de Janeiro; Referees: Santos, Fonseca (POR)
11 August 2016; 11:30	4× (yellow card) 7× (suspension)	Report	3× (yellow card) 6× (suspension) 1× (red card)	Future Arena, Rio de Janeiro; Referees: Santos, Fonseca (POR)

13 August 2016; 16:40	**Egypt**	**27–27**	**Brazil**	Future Arena, Rio de Janeiro; Referees: Lah, Sok (SLO)
13 August 2016; 16:40	El-Ahmar 9	(15–13)	four players 4	Future Arena, Rio de Janeiro; Referees: Lah, Sok (SLO)
13 August 2016; 16:40	3× (yellow card) 7× (suspension)	Report	4× (yellow card) 2× (suspension)	Future Arena, Rio de Janeiro; Referees: Lah, Sok (SLO)

15 August 2016; 11:30	**Germany**	**31–25**	**Egypt**	Future Arena, Rio de Janeiro; Referees: Hansen, Gjeding (DEN)
15 August 2016; 11:30	Gensheimer 7	(15–12)	Sanad 7	Future Arena, Rio de Janeiro; Referees: Hansen, Gjeding (DEN)
15 August 2016; 11:30	2× (yellow card) 9× (suspension)	Report	1× (yellow card) 3× (suspension)	Future Arena, Rio de Janeiro; Referees: Hansen, Gjeding (DEN)

== Judo ==
Egypt has qualified a total of five judokas for each of the following weight classes at the Games. Mohamed Mohy Eldin, Mohamed Abdelaal, Ramadan Darwish, and three-time Olympian Islam El Shehaby were ranked among the top 22 eligible judokas for men in the IJF World Ranking List of 30 May 2016, while Ahmed Abdelrahman at men's extra-lightweight (60 kg) earned a continental quota spot from the African region, as the highest-ranked Egyptian judoka outside of direct qualifying position.

El Shehaby lost his first match to Israel's Or Sasson, but refused to bow or shake hands with him, resulting in a loud jeer from the crowd. When Sasson extended his hand to shake after the match, El Shehaby backed away, shaking his head. The referee called El Shehaby back to the mat and obliged him to bow, at which point El Shehaby gave a quick nod of his head. El Shehaby's conduct was widely condemned as unsportsmanlike. It is unclear what potential punishment El Shehaby or Egyptian judo as a whole could face, but his hopes of medaling were dashed regardless due to Sasson's decisive performance in the quarterfinals.

Before his match, El Shehaby was under pressure to forfeit, as Iranian Javad Mahjoub had done years earlier before his match with Or Sasson.

El Shehaby's refusal to shake hands had precedent, in actions by another member of Egypt's team. Egyptian judoka Ramadan Darwish had refused to shake hands with his Israeli opponent Ariel Ze'evi, another Israeli Olympic bronze medalist, in both the 2011 Judo Grand Slam and the 2012 Judo Grand Prix.

The Egyptian Olympic Committee, which had put pressure on El Shehaby to have the match with Sasson go on as planned, stated that El Shehaby's actions after the match were a personal decision. Both the International Olympic Committee and the International Judo Federation stated that they would review the incident.

The Disciplinary Committee of the International Olympic Committee issued a "severe reprimand" to El Shehaby for behavior violating "the rules of fair play and against the spirit of friendship embodied in the Olympic Values", and he was sent home before the Olympics closing ceremony. The IOC Disciplinary Committee also requested that the Egyptian Olympic Committee in the future must ensure that all Egyptian athletes are properly educated as to the Olympic values, before they participate in the Olympic Games.

Athlete	Event	Round of 64	Round of 32	Round of 16	Quarterfinals	Semifinals	Repechage	Final / BM	
Athlete	Event	Opposition Result	Opposition Result	Opposition Result	Opposition Result	Opposition Result	Opposition Result	Opposition Result	Rank
Ahmed Abelrahman	Men's −60 kg	Bye	Bestaev (KGZ); **L** 000–101	Did not advance					
Mohamed Mohy Eldin	Men's −73 kg	Bye	Ganbaatar (MGL); **L** 001–100	Did not advance					
Mohamed Abdelaal	Men's −81 kg	Bye	Uuganbaatar (MGL); **W** 101–100	Khalmurzaev (RUS); **L** 000–010	Did not advance				
Ramadan Darwish	Men's −100 kg	Bye	Dugasse (SEY); **W** 100–000	Armenteros (CUB); **W** 001–000	Gasimov (AZE); **L** 000–100	Did not advance	Frey (GER); **L** 000–100	Did not advance	7
Islam El Shehaby	Men's +100 kg	—N/a	Sasson (ISR); **L** 000–100	Did not advance					

== Modern pentathlon ==
Egyptian athletes have qualified for the following spots to compete in modern pentathlon. Eslam Hamad and Haydy Morsy secured a selection each in the men's and women's event respectively by virtue of their top finish at the 2015 African Championships. Two-time Olympian Amro El-Geziry, who finished behind Hamad at the African Championships, and his younger brother Omar ranked among the top 10 modern pentathletes, not yet qualified, in the men's event based on the UIPM World Rankings as of 1 June 2016. With the Egyptian men to guarantee their selection at the 2016 World Championships, the choice of four modern pentathletes going to the Games was determined by the NOC. In the event, the Egyptian team decided to select them over Eslam Hamad, as the nation's top two on the list.

Athlete	Event	Fencing (épée one touch)				Swimming (200 m freestyle)			Riding (show jumping)			Combined: shooting/running (10 m air pistol)/(3200 m)			Total points	Final rank
Athlete	Event	RR	BR	Rank	MP points	Time	Rank	MP points	Penalties	Rank	MP points	Time	Rank	MP Points	Total points	Final rank
Amro El-Geziry	Men's	18–17	0	18	208	1:55.80	2	353	9	10	291	12:39.19	35	541	1393	25
Omar El-Geziry	Men's	23–12	1	3	239	2:03.62	15	330	35	28	265	12:11.94	33	569	1403	23
Haydy Morsy	Women's	14–21	0	32	184	2:26.11	36	262	EL	=31	0	13:24.93	28	496	942	36

== Rowing ==
Egypt has qualified one boat each in the men's and women's single sculls for the Games at the 2015 African Continental Qualification Regatta in Tunis, Tunisia.

Athlete	Event	Heats		Repechage		Quarterfinals		Semifinals		Final	
Athlete	Event	Time	Rank	Time	Rank	Time	Rank	Time	Rank	Time	Rank
Abdelkhalek El-Banna	Men's single sculls	7:34.05	3 **QF**	Bye		6:50.82	3 **SA/B**	7:13.55	5 **FB**	6:54.94	10
Nadia Negm	Women's single sculls	9:14.55	3 **QF**	Bye		8:25.75	6 **SC/D**	8:39.50	6 **FD**	8:09.47	24

Qualification Legend: FA=Final A (medal); FB=Final B (non-medal); FC=Final C (non-medal); FD=Final D (non-medal); FE=Final E (non-medal); FF=Final F (non-medal); SA/B=Semifinals A/B; SC/D=Semifinals C/D; SE/F=Semifinals E/F; QF=Quarterfinals; R=Repechage

== Sailing ==
Egypt has qualified one sailor in the men's Laser class through the African continental regatta.

Athlete	Event	Race											Net points	Final rank
Athlete	Event	1	2	3	4	5	6	7	8	9	10	M*	Net points	Final rank
Ahmed Ragab	Men's Laser	36	22	44	41	41	41	42	40	~~45~~	42	EL	349	43

M = Medal race; EL = Eliminated – did not advance into the medal race

== Shooting ==
Egyptian shooters have achieved quota places for the following events by virtue of their best finishes at the 2014 and 2015 ISSF World Championships, the 2015 ISSF World Cup series, and African Championships, as long as they obtained a minimum qualifying score (MQS) by 31 March 2016.

Men

Athlete	Event	Qualification		Semifinal		Final	
Athlete	Event	Points	Rank	Points	Rank	Points	Rank
Ahmed Darwish	50 m rifle prone	615.0	44	—N/a		Did not advance	
Franco Donato	Skeet	115	28	Did not advance			
Ahmed Kamar	Trap	119	4 **Q**	12 (+2)	5	Did not advance	
Abdel-Aziz Mehelba	Trap	112	24	Did not advance			
Azmy Mehelba	Skeet	120	11	Did not advance			
Ahmed Mohamed	10 m air pistol	564	45	—N/a		Did not advance	
Samy Abdel Razek	10 m air pistol	574	30	—N/a		Did not advance	
Samy Abdel Razek	50 m pistol	534	37	—N/a		Did not advance	
Ahmed Shaban	25 m rapid fire pistol	562	23	—N/a		Did not advance	
Hamada Talat	10 m air rifle	618.2	39	—N/a		Did not advance	
Hamada Talat	50 m rifle 3 positions	1151	41	—N/a		Did not advance	

Women

Athlete	Event	Qualification		Semifinal		Final	
Athlete	Event	Points	Rank	Points	Rank	Points	Rank
Afaf El-Hodhod	10 m air pistol	386	5 **Q**	—N/a		137.1	5
Afaf El-Hodhod	25 m pistol	573	25	Did not advance			
Shaimaa Abdel-Latif-Hashad	10 m air rifle	413.2	27	—N/a		Did not advance	
Hadir Mekhimar	10 m air rifle	401.3	49	—N/a		Did not advance	

Qualification Legend: Q = Qualify for the next round; q = Qualify for the bronze medal (shotgun)

== Swimming ==
Egyptian swimmers have so far achieved qualifying standards in the following events (up to a maximum of 2 swimmers in each event at the Olympic Qualifying Time (OQT), and potentially 1 at the Olympic Selection Time (OST)):

Men

Athlete	Event	Heat		Semifinal		Final	
Athlete	Event	Time	Rank	Time	Rank	Time	Rank
Ahmed Akram	400 m freestyle	3:49.46	27	—N/a		Did not advance	
Ahmed Akram	1500 m freestyle	14:58.37	11	—N/a		Did not advance	
Marwan El-Amrawy	10 km open water	—N/a				1:59:17.2	23
Marwan El-Kamash	200 m freestyle	1:47.52	24	Did not advance			
Marwan El-Kamash	400 m freestyle	3:47.43	16	—N/a		Did not advance	
Mohamed Hussein	200 m individual medley	2:02.36	25	Did not advance			
Ali Khalafalla	50 m freestyle	22.25 **=NR**	23	Did not advance			

Women

Athlete	Event	Heat		Semifinal		Final	
Athlete	Event	Time	Rank	Time	Rank	Time	Rank
Reem Kaseem	10 km open water	—N/a				2:05:19.1	25
Farida Osman	50 m freestyle	24.91	=18	Did not advance			
Farida Osman	100 m butterfly	57.83 **AF**	11 **Q**	58.26	11	Did not advance	

== Synchronized swimming ==
Egypt has fielded a squad of nine synchronized swimmers to compete in the women's duet and team events, by virtue of their top national finish for Africa at the 2015 FINA World Championships.

Athlete	Event	Technical routine		Free routine (preliminary)			Free routine (final)		
Athlete	Event	Points	Rank	Points	Total (technical + free)	Rank	Points	Total (technical + free)	Rank
Samia Ahmed; Dara Hassanien	Duet	76.5306	23	77.6000	154.1306	23	Did not advance		
Nariman Abdelhafiz; Leila Abdelmoez; Samia Ahmed; Nour El-Ayoubi; Jomana El-Maghrabi; Dara Hassanien; Salma Negmeldin; Nada Saafan; Nehal Saafan	Team	76.9838	7	—N/a			78.5667	155.5505	7

== Table tennis ==
Egypt has entered four athletes into the table tennis competition at the Games. Brothers Khalid and Omar Assar secured places on the Egyptian squad in the men's singles, while 2012 Olympians Nadeen El-Dawlatly and Dina Meshref in the women's singles; all of them have reached the semifinals in each of their respective events at the 2015 All-Africa Games.

Yousra Abdel Razek was awarded the third spot to build the women's team for the Games as the top African nation in the ITTF Olympic Rankings.

Athlete	Event	Preliminary	Round 1	Round 2	Round 3	Round of 16	Quarterfinals	Semifinals	Final / BM	
Athlete	Event	Opposition Result	Opposition Result	Opposition Result	Opposition Result	Opposition Result	Opposition Result	Opposition Result	Opposition Result	Rank
Khalid Assar	Men's singles	Wang Jn (CGO); **L** 3–4	Did not advance							
Omar Assar	Men's singles	Bye	Afanador (PUR); **W** 4–2	Kou (UKR); **L** 3–4	Did not advance					
Nadeen El-Dawlatly	Women's singles	Bye	Lovas (HUN); **L** 0–4	Did not advance						
Dina Meshref	Women's singles	Saidani (TUN); **W** 4–0	Komwong (THA); **L** 1–4	Did not advance						
Yousra Abdel Razek; Nadeen El-Dawlatly; Dina Meshref	Women's team	—N/a				Singapore; **L** 0–3	Did not advance			

== Taekwondo ==
Egypt entered three athletes into the taekwondo competition at the Olympics. 2012 Olympian Hedaya Malak qualified automatically for the women's lightweight category (57 kg) by finishing in the top 6 WTF Olympic rankings. Meanwhile, Ghofran Zaki and Seham El-Sawalhy secured the remaining spots on the Egyptian team by virtue of their top two finish respectively in the men's lightweight (68 kg) and women's welterweight category (67 kg) at the 2016 African Qualification Tournament in Agadir, Morocco.

Athlete	Event	Round of 16	Quarterfinals	Semifinals	Repechage	Final / BM	
Athlete	Event	Opposition Result	Opposition Result	Opposition Result	Opposition Result	Opposition Result	Rank
Ghofran Zaki	Men's −68 kg	Abu-Ghaush (JOR); **L** 1–9	Bye		Lee D-h (KOR); **L** 6–14	Did not advance	7
**Hedaya Malak**	Women's −57 kg	Patiño (COL); **W** 13–0 PTG	Hamada (JPN); **W** 3–0 SUD	Calvo (ESP); **L** 0–1 SUD	Bye	Asemani (BEL); **W** 1–0 SUD	3rd place, bronze medalist(s)
Seham El-Sawalhy	Women's −67 kg	Gbagbi (CIV); **L** 3–4	Did not advance				

== Volleyball ==
=== Beach ===
Egypt women's beach volleyball team qualified for the Olympics by winning the CAVB Continental Cup final in Abuja, Nigeria, signifying the nation's Olympic debut in the sport.

Athlete	Event	Preliminary round	Standing	Round of 16	Quarterfinals	Semifinals	Final / BM	
Athlete	Event	Opposition Score	Standing	Opposition Score	Opposition Score	Opposition Score	Opposition Score	Rank
Doaa El-Ghobashy; Nada Meawad	Women's	Pool D Ludwig – Walkenhorst (GER); **L** 0 – 2 (12–21, 15–21); Giombini – Menegatti (ITA); **L** 0 – 2 (10–21, 13–21); Broder – Valjas (CAN); **L** 0 – 2 (12–21, 16–21)	4	Did not advance				

=== Indoor ===
==== Men's tournament ====
Egypt men's volleyball team qualified for the Olympics by attaining a top finish and securing a lone outright berth at the African Olympic Qualifying Tournament in Brazzaville, Republic of the Congo.

Team roster

The following is the Egypt roster in the men's volleyball tournament of the 2016 Summer Olympics.

Head coach: Sherif El Shemerly

No.	Name	Date of birth	Height	Weight	Spike	Block	2015–16 club
3	Abou Abd Elahim	3 June 1989	2.10 m (6 ft 11 in)	88 kg (194 lb)	285 cm (112 in)	270 cm (110 in)	(Egypt) Al Ahly
4	Ahmed Abdelhay	19 August 1984	1.97 m (6 ft 6 in)	87 kg (192 lb)	342 cm (135 in)	316 cm (124 in)	(Egypt) Army
6	Mamdouh Abdelrehim	5 August 1989	2.07 m (6 ft 9 in)	90 kg (200 lb)	338 cm (133 in)	325 cm (128 in)	(Egypt) Army
7	Ashraf Abouelhassan (c)	17 May 1975	1.86 m (6 ft 1 in)	86 kg (190 lb)	325 cm (128 in)	318 cm (125 in)	(Egypt) Zamalek
8	Mohamed Thakil	12 July 1986	1.84 m (6 ft 0 in)	71 kg (157 lb)	326 cm (128 in)	315 cm (124 in)	(Egypt) Army
10	Mohamed Masoud	1 May 1994	2.11 m (6 ft 11 in)	105 kg (231 lb)	358 cm (141 in)	342 cm (135 in)	(Egypt) Smouha
11	Ahmed Afifi	30 March 1988	1.94 m (6 ft 4 in)	92 kg (203 lb)	347 cm (137 in)	342 cm (135 in)	(Egypt) Zamalek
12	Hossam Abdalla	16 February 1988	2.03 m (6 ft 8 in)	97 kg (214 lb)	343 cm (135 in)	321 cm (126 in)	(Egypt) Al Ahly
13	Mohamed Badawy	11 January 1986	1.95 m (6 ft 5 in)	91 kg (201 lb)	326 cm (128 in)	319 cm (126 in)	(Egypt) Zamalek
14	Omar Hassan	4 April 1991	1.91 m (6 ft 3 in)	104 kg (229 lb)	333 cm (131 in)	324 cm (128 in)	(Egypt) Army
15	Ahmed El-Kotb	23 July 1991	1.97 m (6 ft 6 in)	80 kg (180 lb)	328 cm (129 in)	318 cm (125 in)	(Egypt) Al Ahly
22	Ahmed Abdelaal (L)	8 June 1989	1.88 m (6 ft 2 in)	89 kg (196 lb)	0 cm (0 in)	0 cm (0 in)	(Egypt) Army

Group play

Pos	Team	Pld	W	L	Pts	SW	SL	SR	SPW	SPL	SPR	Qualification
1	Argentina	5	4	1	12	12	4	3.000	394	335	1.176	Quarterfinals
2	Poland	5	4	1	12	14	5	2.800	447	389	1.149	Quarterfinals
3	Russia	5	4	1	11	13	6	2.167	432	367	1.177	Quarterfinals
4	Iran	5	2	3	7	8	9	0.889	389	392	0.992	Quarterfinals
5	Egypt	5	1	4	3	3	12	0.250	286	362	0.790	
6	Cuba	5	0	5	0	1	15	0.067	300	403	0.744	

Source: FIVB
Rules for classification: Tiebreakers

7 August 2016; 15:00	**Poland**	**3–0**	Egypt	Ginásio do Maracanãzinho, Rio de Janeiro; Attendance: 5,658; Referees: Juraj Mokrý (SVK), Susana Rodríguez (ESP)
7 August 2016; 15:00	(25–18, 25–20, 25–17); Results Statistics			Ginásio do Maracanãzinho, Rio de Janeiro; Attendance: 5,658; Referees: Juraj Mokrý (SVK), Susana Rodríguez (ESP)

9 August 2016; 20:30	Cuba	**0–3**	**Egypt**	Ginásio do Maracanãzinho, Rio de Janeiro; Attendance: 5,016; Referees: Rogerio Espicalsky (BRA), Denny Cespedes (DOM)
9 August 2016; 20:30	(22–25, 15–25, 22–25); Results Statistics			Ginásio do Maracanãzinho, Rio de Janeiro; Attendance: 5,016; Referees: Rogerio Espicalsky (BRA), Denny Cespedes (DOM)

11 August 2016; 11:35	**Russia**	**3–0**	Egypt	Ginásio do Maracanãzinho, Rio de Janeiro; Attendance: 6,665; Referees: Paulo Turci (BRA), Ibrahim Al-Naama (QAT)
11 August 2016; 11:35	(25–11, 25–17, 25–9); Results Statistics			Ginásio do Maracanãzinho, Rio de Janeiro; Attendance: 6,665; Referees: Paulo Turci (BRA), Ibrahim Al-Naama (QAT)

13 August 2016; 09:30	**Iran**	**3–0**	Egypt	Ginásio do Maracanãzinho, Rio de Janeiro; Attendance: 6,262; Referees: Andrey Zenovich (RUS), Rogerio Espicalsky (BRA)
13 August 2016; 09:30	(28–26, 25–22, 25–16); Results Statistics			Ginásio do Maracanãzinho, Rio de Janeiro; Attendance: 6,262; Referees: Andrey Zenovich (RUS), Rogerio Espicalsky (BRA)

15 August 2016; 09:30	**Argentina**	**3–0**	Egypt	Ginásio do Maracanãzinho, Rio de Janeiro; Attendance: 8,175; Referees: Luis Macias (MEX), Arturo Di Giacomo (BEL)
15 August 2016; 09:30	(25–16, 25–19, 25–20); Results Statistics			Ginásio do Maracanãzinho, Rio de Janeiro; Attendance: 8,175; Referees: Luis Macias (MEX), Arturo Di Giacomo (BEL)

== Weightlifting ==
Egyptian weightlifters have qualified six men's and three women's quota places for the Rio Olympics based on their combined team standing by points at the 2014 and 2015 IWF World Championships. The team must allocate these places to individual athletes by 20 June 2016.

Men

Athlete	Event	Snatch		Clean & Jerk		Total	Rank
Athlete	Event	Result	Rank	Result	Rank	Total	Rank
Ahmed Saad	−62 kg	133	5	161	7	294	5
**Mohamed Ihab**	−77 kg	165	4	196	3	361	3rd place, bronze medalist(s)
Ibrahim Abdelbaki	−77 kg	152	9	186	9	338	9
Ragab Abdelhay	−94 kg	174	5	213	5	387	5
Gaber Mohamed	−105 kg	173	12	204	13	377	12
Ahmed Mohamed	+105 kg	190	10	—	—	190	DNF

Women

Athlete	Event	Snatch		Clean & Jerk		Total	Rank
Athlete	Event	Result	Rank	Result	Rank	Total	Rank
Esraa El-Sayed	−63 kg	100	5	116	8	216	7
**Sara Samir**	−69 kg	112	3	143	3	255	3rd place, bronze medalist(s)
Shaimaa Khalaf	+75 kg	117	7	161	3	278	4

== Wrestling ==
Egypt has qualified a total of ten wrestlers for each of the following weight classes into the Olympic competition, as a result of their semifinal triumphs at the 2016 African & Oceania Qualification Tournament.

On 11 May 2016, United World Wrestling decided to revoke an Olympic license from Egypt in men's freestyle 97 kg, due to doping violations at the African Qualification Tournament.

Key:

- VT – Victory by Fall.
- PP – Decision by Points – the loser with technical points.
- PO – Decision by Points – the loser without technical points.
- ST – Technical superiority – the loser without technical points and a margin of victory of at least 8 (Greco-Roman) or 10 (freestyle) points.

Men's freestyle

Athlete	Event	Qualification	Round of 16	Quarterfinal	Semifinal	Repechage 1	Repechage 2	Final / BM	
Athlete	Event	Opposition Result	Opposition Result	Opposition Result	Opposition Result	Opposition Result	Opposition Result	Opposition Result	Rank
Mohamed Zaghloul	−86 kg	Bye	Ceballos (VEN); **L** 0–3 ^{PO}	Did not advance					17
Diaaeldin Kamal	−125 kg	Chebbi (TUN); **W** 4–0 ^{ST}	Ghasemi (IRI); **L** 0–3 ^{PO}	Did not advance		Jarvis (CAN); **L** 0–3 ^{PO}	Did not advance		9

Men's Greco-Roman

Athlete	Event	Qualification	Round of 16	Quarterfinal	Semifinal	Repechage 1	Repechage 2	Final / BM	
Athlete	Event	Opposition Result	Opposition Result	Opposition Result	Opposition Result	Opposition Result	Opposition Result	Opposition Result	Rank
Haithem Mahmoud	−59 kg	Bye	Yun W-c (PRK); **L** 1–3 ^{PP}	Did not advance					12
Adham Ahmed Saleh	−66 kg	Bye	Arutyunyan (ARM); **L** 0–4 ^{ST}	Did not advance		Bye	Ryu H-s (KOR); **L** 0–3 ^{PO}	Did not advance	18
Mahmoud Fawzy	−75 kg	Mursaliyev (AZE); **L** 1–3 ^{PP}	Did not advance						15
Ahmed Othman	−85 kg	Bye	Beleniuk (UKR); **L** 0–4 ^{ST}	Did not advance		Bye	Bayryakov (BUL); **L** 1–3 ^{PP}	Did not advance	14
Hamdy El-Said	−98 kg	Bye	Alexuc-Ciurariu (ROU); **L** 1–3 ^{PP}	Did not advance					10
Abdellatif Mohamed	−130 kg	Chernetskyi (UKR); **L** 0–4 ^{ST}	Did not advance						17

Women's freestyle

Athlete	Event	Qualification	Round of 16	Quarterfinal	Semifinal	Repechage 1	Repechage 2	Final / BM	
Athlete	Event	Opposition Result	Opposition Result	Opposition Result	Opposition Result	Opposition Result	Opposition Result	Opposition Result	Rank
Enas Mostafa	−69 kg	Bye	Acosta (VEN); **W** 3–1 ^{PP}	Oliveira (BRA); **W** 5–0 ^{VT}	Vorobieva (RUS); **L** 0–5 ^{VT}	Bye		Syzdykova (KAZ); **L** 1–3 ^{PP}	5
Samar Amer	−75 kg	Bukina (RUS); **L** 1–3 ^{PP}	Did not advance						12

== See also ==
- Egypt at the 2016 Summer Paralympics
