= 2014 World Wrestling Championships – Women's freestyle 69 kg =

Women's freestyle 69 kg at the 2014 World Championships
- Venue: Gymnastics Sport Palace
- Dates: 10 September 2014
- Competitors: 24 from 24 nations

Medalists
gold medal	Aline Focken	Germany
silver medal	Sara Dosho	Japan
bronze medal	Laura Skujiņa	Latvia
bronze medal	Natalia Vorobieva	Russia

The women's freestyle 69 kilograms is a competition featured at the 2014 World Wrestling Championships and was held in Tashkent, Uzbekistan on 10 September 2014.

This freestyle wrestling competition consisted of a single-elimination tournament, with a repechage used to determine the winners of two bronze medals.

== Results ==
Legend

- F — Won by fall

=== Final ===
Final
Aline Focken (GER)	5
Sara Dosho (JPN)	4

=== Top half ===
Round of 32

Round of 16
Leidy Izquierdo (COL)	11^{F}
Jung Eun-sun (KOR)	0
Badrakhyn Odonchimeg (MGL)	2
Laura Skujiņa (LAT)	5
Diana Miranda (MEX)	10
Aziza Sultamuratova (UZB)	0
Aline Focken (GER)	8
Elmira Syzdykova (KAZ)	5

Quarterfinals
Leidy Izquierdo (COL)	0
Laura Skujiņa (LAT)	10^{F}
Diana Miranda (MEX)	0
Aline Focken (GER)	4^{F}

Semifinals
Laura Skujiņa (LAT)	1
Aline Focken (GER)	3

=== Bottom half ===
Round of 32
Karine Shadoyan (ARM)	2
Zhou Feng (CHN)	12
Suman Kundu (IND)	0
Natalia Vorobieva (RUS)	10^{F}
Dorothy Yeats (CAN)	11
Enas Mostafa (EGY)	1
Nadya Sementsova (AZE)	4
Svetlana Saenko (MDA)	1
Randi Miller (USA)	0
Agnieszka Wieszczek (POL)	5^{F}
Jenny Fransson (SWE)	4^{F}
Krystsina Fedarashka (BLR)	0
Alina Stadnyk (UKR)	5^{F}
María Acosta (VEN)	1
Sara Dosho (JPN)	6^{F}
Adina Popescu (ROU)	0

Round of 16
Zhou Feng (CHN)	0
Natalia Vorobieva (RUS)	3^{F}
Dorothy Yeats (CAN)	12
Nadya Sementsova (AZE)	9
Agnieszka Wieszczek (POL)	3
Jenny Fransson (SWE)	5^{F}
Alina Stadnyk (UKR)	4
Sara Dosho (JPN)	7

Quarterfinals
Natalia Vorobieva (RUS)	10^{F}
Dorothy Yeats (CAN)	0
Jenny Fransson (SWE)	6
Sara Dosho (JPN)	8

Semifinals
Natalia Vorobieva (RUS)	3
Sara Dosho (JPN)	6

=== Repechage ===
Repechage round 1
Adina Popescu (ROU)	4
Alina Stadnyk (UKR)	6

Repechage round 2
Elmira Syzdykova (KAZ)	6
Diana Miranda (MEX)	9
Alina Stadnyk (UKR)	2
Jenny Fransson (SWE)	6

Bronze medals
Diana Miranda (MEX)	0
Laura Skujiņa (LAT)	6^{F}
Jenny Fransson (SWE)	0
Natalia Vorobieva (RUS)	10^{F}
