= 2013 World Wrestling Championships – Women's freestyle 67 kg =

Women's wrestling competition

Women's freestyle 67 kg at the 2013 World Championships
- Venue: László Papp Budapest Sports Arena
- Dates: 20 September 2013
- Competitors: 24 from 24 nations

Medalists
gold medal	Alina Stadnyk	Ukraine
silver medal	Stacie Anaka	Canada
bronze medal	Ochirbatyn Nasanburmaa	Mongolia
bronze medal	Sara Dosho	Japan

The women's freestyle 67 kilograms is a competition featured at the 2013 World Wrestling Championships, and was held at the László Papp Budapest Sports Arena in Budapest, Hungary on 20 September 2013.

This freestyle wrestling competition consisted of a single-elimination tournament, with a repechage used to determine the winners of two bronze medals.

== Results ==
Legend

- F — Won by fall
- R — Retired

=== Final ===
Final
Stacie Anaka (CAN)	2
Alina Stadnyk (UKR)	5^{F}

=== Top half ===
Round of 32

Round of 16
Gozal Zutova (AZE)	6
Elmira Syzdykova (KAZ)	0
Ochirbatyn Nasanburmaa (MGL)	2
Stacie Anaka (CAN)	3
Veronica Carlson (USA)	2
Nadia Antar (EGY)	3^{R}
Zhou Zhangting (CHN)	7
Adina Popescu (ROU)	0

Quarterfinals
Gozal Zutova (AZE)	1
Stacie Anaka (CAN)	9
Veronica Carlson (USA)	0
Zhou Zhangting (CHN)	9

Semifinals
Stacie Anaka (CAN)	8
Zhou Zhangting (CHN)	6

=== Bottom half ===
Round of 32
Alina Stadnyk (UKR)	7
Halina Leuchanka (BLR)	0
Laura Skujiņa (LAT)	5^{F}
Dalma Caneva (ITA)	0
Aline Focken (GER)	8
Kitti Godó (HUN)	2
Elina Vaseva (BUL)	3
Natalia Kuksina (RUS)	5
Gamze Durukan (TUR)	0
Daria Osocka (POL)	7
Sara Dosho (JPN)	7^{F}
Luz Vázquez (ARG)	4
Gilda Oliveira (BRA)	4
Navjot Kaur (IND)	11
Leidy Izquierdo (COL)	9
Chen Wen-ling (TPE)	0

Round of 16
Alina Stadnyk (UKR)	5
Laura Skujiņa (LAT)	4
Aline Focken (GER)	5
Natalia Kuksina (RUS)	4
Daria Osocka (POL)	0
Sara Dosho (JPN)	7
Navjot Kaur (IND)	0
Leidy Izquierdo (COL)	9

Quarterfinals
Alina Stadnyk (UKR)	4^{F}
Aline Focken (GER)	0
Sara Dosho (JPN)	6^{F}
Leidy Izquierdo (COL)	2

Semifinals
Alina Stadnyk (UKR)	3^{F}
Sara Dosho (JPN)	4

=== Repechage ===
Repechage round 1
Halina Leuchanka (BLR)	2
Laura Skujiņa (LAT)	10

Repechage round 2
Ochirbatyn Nasanburmaa (MGL)	7^{F}
Gozal Zutova (AZE)	0
Laura Skujiņa (LAT)	0
Aline Focken (GER)	3

Bronze medals
Ochirbatyn Nasanburmaa (MGL)	2
Zhou Zhangting (CHN)	1
Aline Focken (GER)	1
Sara Dosho (JPN)	9^{F}
