= 2014 European Wrestling Championships – Women's freestyle 69 kg =

Wrestling competitions

The women's freestyle 69 kg is a competition featured at the 2014 European Wrestling Championships, and was held in Vantaa, Finland on April 2.

== Medalists ==
Gold	Natalia Vorobieva; Russia
Silver	Ilana Kratysh; Israel
Bronze	Laura Skujiņa; Latvia
Bronze	Alina Stadnik; Ukraine

== Results ==
Legend

- F — Won by fall

=== Final ===
Final
Ilana Kratysh (ISR)	4
Natalia Vorobieva (RUS)	11^{F}

=== Top half ===
Round of 32

Round of 16
Nadya Sementsova (AZE)
Svetlana Saenko (MDA)	WO
Dayana Ivanova (BUL)	2
Martina Kuenz (AUT)	3
Laura Skujiņa (LAT)	5
Burcu Örskaya (TUR)	4
Ilana Kratysh (ISR)	5
Dalma Caneva (ITA)	2

Quarterfinals
Svetlana Saenko (MDA)	12
Martina Kuenz (AUT)	2
Laura Skujiņa (LAT)	0
Ilana Kratysh (ISR)	4^{F}

Semifinals
Svetlana Saenko (MDA)	3
Ilana Kratysh (ISR)	4

=== Bottom half ===
Round of 32
Danutė Domikaitytė (LTU)	5
Karine Shadoyan (ARM)	5

Round of 16
Aline Focken (GER)	7
Jenny Fransson (SWE)	5
Adina Popescu (ROU)	0
Natalia Vorobieva (RUS)	5^{F}
Halina Leuchanka (BLR)	1
Daria Osocka (POL)	11
Alina Stadnik (UKR)	6^{F}
Danutė Domikaitytė (LTU)	0

Quarterfinals
Aline Focken (GER)	0
Natalia Vorobieva (RUS)	6
Daria Osocka (POL)	0
Alina Stadnik (UKR)	8^{F}

Semifinals
Natalia Vorobieva (RUS)	4^{F}
Alina Stadnik (UKR)	0

=== Repechage ===
Repechage round 1
Dalma Caneva (ITA)	0
Svetlana Saenko (MDA)	8
Adina Popescu (ROU)	1
Aline Focken (GER)	11

Bronze medals
Svetlana Saenko (MDA)	2
Laura Skujiņa (LAT)	9
Aline Focken (GER)	1
Alina Stadnik (UKR)	5
