= Wrestling at the 2016 Summer Olympics – Women's freestyle 69 kg =

Women's freestyle 69 kg at the Games of the XXXI Olympiad
- Venue: Carioca Arena 2
- Date: 17 August 2016
- Competitors: 18 from 18 nations

Medalists
| 1st place, gold medalist(s) | | Sara Dosho | Japan |
| 2nd place, silver medalist(s) | | Natalia Vorobieva | Russia |
| 3rd place, bronze medalist(s) | | Elmira Syzdykova | Kazakhstan |
| 3rd place, bronze medalist(s) | | Jenny Fransson | Sweden |

Women's freestyle 69 kilograms competition at the 2016 Summer Olympics in Rio de Janeiro, Brazil, took place on August 17 at the Carioca Arena 2 in Barra da Tijuca.

This freestyle wrestling competition consists of a single-elimination tournament, with a repechage used to determine the winner of two bronze medals. The two finalists face off for gold and silver medals. Each wrestler who loses to one of the two finalists moves into the repechage, culminating in a pair of bronze medal matches featuring the semifinal losers each facing the remaining repechage opponent from their half of the bracket.

The medals for the competition were presented by Habu Ahmed Gumel, IOC member, Nigeria, and the gifts were presented by Karl-Martin Dittmann, United World Wrestling board member.

== Schedule ==
All times are Brasília Standard Time (UTC−03:00)

| Date | Time | Event |
|---|---|---|
| 17 August 2016 | 10:00 | Qualification rounds |
| 17 August 2016 | 16:00 | Repechage |
| 17 August 2016 | 17:00 | Finals |

== Results ==
Legend

- F — Won by fall

=== Final ===
| Final |
| Natalia Vorobieva (RUS) | 2 |
| Sara Dosho (JPN) | 2 |

=== Top half ===
Qualifications

1/8 finals
Natalia Vorobieva (RUS) | 4
Elmira Syzdykova (KAZ) | 1
Chen Wen-ling (TPE) | 0
Ochirbatyn Nasanburmaa (MGL) | 6^{F}
María Acosta (VEN) | 0
Enas Mostafa (EGY) | 8
Ilana Kratysh (ISR) | 2
Gilda Oliveira (BRA) | 6

1/4 finals
Natalia Vorobieva (RUS) | 4^{F}
Ochirbatyn Nasanburmaa (MGL) | 2
Enas Mostafa (EGY) | 5^{F}
Gilda Oliveira (BRA) | 1

Semifinals
Natalia Vorobieva (RUS) | 4^{F}
Enas Mostafa (EGY) | 2

=== Bottom half ===
Qualifications
Agnieszka Wieszczek (POL) | 0
Buse Tosun (TUR) | 6^{F}
Sara Dosho (JPN) | 11
Alina Stadnyk (UKR) | 2

1/8 finals
Zhou Feng (CHN) | 3
Aline Focken (GER) | 11
Signe Marie Store (NOR) | 0
Jenny Fransson (SWE) | 9
Hannah Reuben (NGR) | 1
Dorothy Yeats (CAN) | 11
Buse Tosun (TUR) | 0
Sara Dosho (JPN) | 12

1/4 finals
Aline Focken (GER) | 1
Jenny Fransson (SWE) | 9
Dorothy Yeats (CAN) | 2
Sara Dosho (JPN) | 7

Semifinals
Jenny Fransson (SWE) | 2
Sara Dosho (JPN) | 7

=== Repechage ===
Repechage round 1
Alina Stadnyk (UKR) | 4
Buse Tosun (TUR) | 7

Repechage round 2
Elmira Syzdykova (KAZ) | 3
Ochirbatyn Nasanburmaa (MGL) | 2
Buse Tosun (TUR) | 2
Dorothy Yeats (CAN) | 3

Bronze medals
Elmira Syzdykova (KAZ) | 7
Enas Mostafa (EGY) | 4
Dorothy Yeats (CAN) | 1
Jenny Fransson (SWE) | 2

== Final standing ==
| Rank | Athlete |
|---|---|
| 1st place, gold medalist(s) | Sara Dosho (JPN) |
| 2nd place, silver medalist(s) | Natalia Vorobieva (RUS) |
| 3rd place, bronze medalist(s) | Elmira Syzdykova (KAZ) |
| 3rd place, bronze medalist(s) | Jenny Fransson (SWE) |
| 5 | Enas Mostafa (EGY) |
| 5 | Dorothy Yeats (CAN) |
| 7 | Buse Tosun (TUR) |
| 8 | Ochirbatyn Nasanburmaa (MGL) |
| 9 | Aline Focken (GER) |
| 10 | Gilda Oliveira (BRA) |
| 11 | Alina Stadnyk (UKR) |
| 12 | Zhou Feng (CHN) |
| 13 | Ilana Kratysh (ISR) |
| 14 | Hannah Reuben (NGR) |
| 15 | Chen Wen-ling (TPE) |
| 16 | Agnieszka Wieszczek (POL) |
| 17 | María Acosta (VEN) |
| 18 | Signe Marie Store (NOR) |
