= Wrestling at the 2015 Pan American Games – Women's freestyle 69 kg =

Women's Freestyle 69 kg at the 2015 Pan American Games
- Venue: Mississauga Sports Centre
- Dates: July 17
- Competitors: 7 from 7 nations

Medalists
Gold medal	Dorothy Yeats	Canada
Silver medal	María Acosta	Venezuela
Bronze medal	Diana Miranda	Mexico

The women's freestyle 69 kg competition of the Wrestling events at the 2015 Pan American Games in Toronto were held on July 17 at the Mississauga Sports Centre.

== Schedule ==
All times are Eastern Daylight Time (UTC-4).

Date	Time	Round
July 17, 2015	14:35	Quarterfinals
July 17, 2015	15:29	Semifinals
July 17, 2015	20:27	Bronze medal matches
July 17, 2015	20:45	Final

== Results ==
Legend

- F — Won by fall

=== Final ===
Quarterfinals		Semifinals		Finals
		Diana Miranda (MEX)	1
María Acosta (VEN)	5	María Acosta (VEN)	3
Dayanara Rivera (PUR)	0			María Acosta (VEN)	2
Yudari Sánchez (CUB)	0			Dorothy Yeats (CAN)	13
Dorothy Yeats (CAN)	6^{F}	Dorothy Yeats (CAN)	14
Gilda Oliveira (BRA)	0	~~Luz Vázquez (ARG)~~	3
~~Luz Vázquez (ARG)~~	7

=== Repechage ===
Bronze medal match
Dayanara Rivera (PUR)	1
Diana Miranda (MEX)	1
Yudari Sánchez (CUB)	1
~~Luz Vázquez (ARG)~~	7
