= Wrestling at the 2020 Summer Olympics – Women's freestyle 68 kg =

Women's freestyle 68 kg at the Games of the XXXII Olympiad
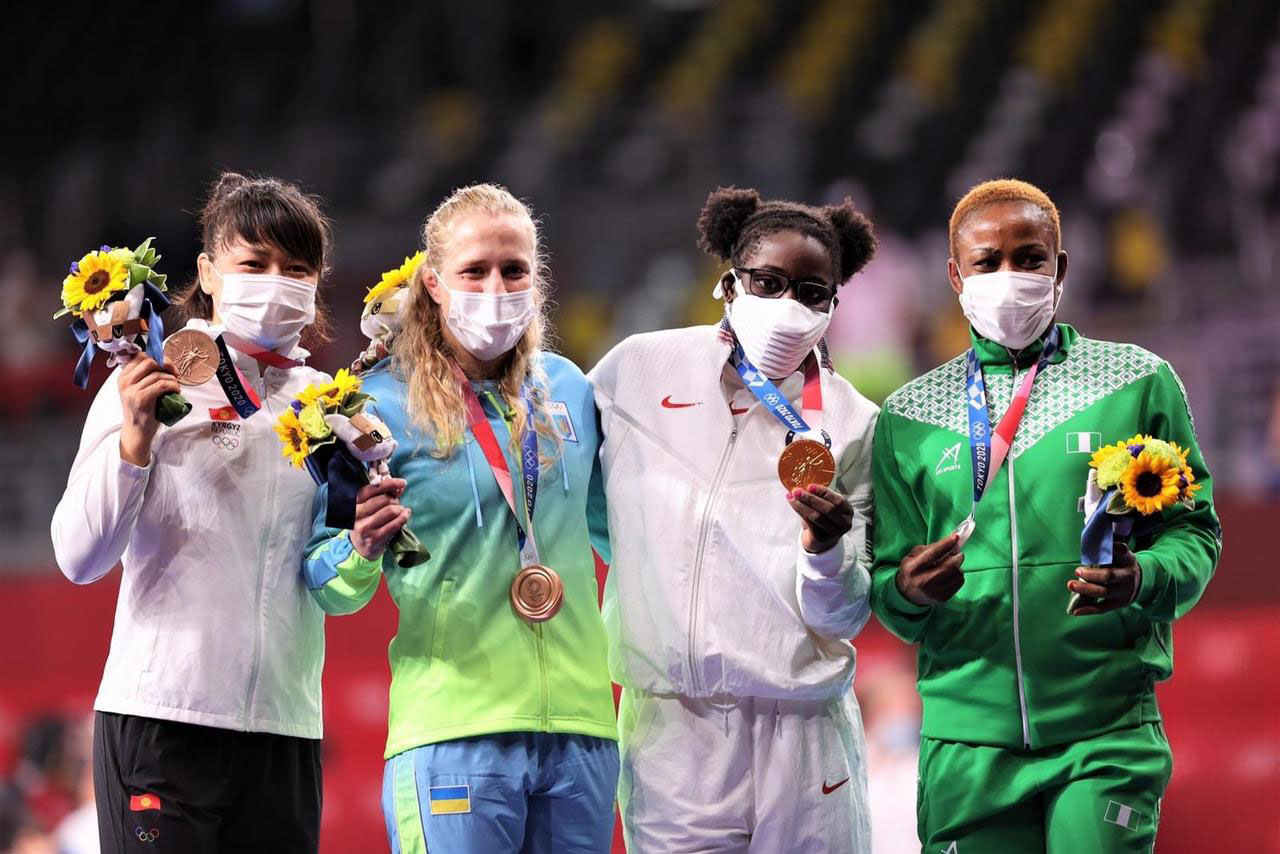
- Venue: Makuhari Messe
- Date: 2–3 August 2021
- Competitors: 16 from 16 nations

Medalists
1st place, gold medalist(s)		Tamyra Mensah-Stock	United States
2nd place, silver medalist(s)		Blessing Oborududu	Nigeria
3rd place, bronze medalist(s)		Alla Cherkasova	Ukraine
3rd place, bronze medalist(s)		Meerim Zhumanazarova	Kyrgyzstan

The women's freestyle 68 kilograms competition at the 2020 Summer Olympics in Tokyo, Japan, took place on 2–3 August 2021 at the Makuhari Messe in Mihama-ku. The qualification rounds were held on 2 August while medal matches were held on the 2nd day of the competition.

This freestyle wrestling competition consists of a single-elimination tournament, with a repechage used to determine the winner of two bronze medals. The two finalists face off for gold and silver medals. Each wrestler who loses to one of the two finalists moves into the repechage, culminating in a pair of bronze medal matches featuring the semifinal losers each facing the remaining repechage opponent from their half of the bracket.

Tamyra Mensah-Stock from the United States won the gold medal after beating Blessing Oborududu from Nigeria 4–1 in the gold medal match.

== Schedule ==
All times are Japan Standard Time (UTC+09:00)

Date	Time	Event
2 August 2021	11:00	Qualification rounds
2 August 2021	18:15	Semifinals
3 August 2021	11:00	Repechage
3 August 2021	19:30	Finals

== Results ==
Legend

- F — Won by fall

=== Main bracket ===
1/8 finals
Tamyra Mensah-Stock (USA)	10
Sara Dosho (JPN)	0
Zhou Feng (CHN)	13
Yudaris Sánchez (CUB)	2
Agnieszka Wieszczek (POL)	0
Alla Cherkasova (UKR)	11
Enas Mostafa (EGY)	0
Anna Schell (GER)	7
Koumba Larroque (FRA)	3
Soronzonboldyn Battsetseg (MGL)	4^{F}
Danielle Lappage (CAN)	0
Khanum Velieva (ROC)	7
Mimi Hristova (BUL)	5
Meerim Zhumanazarova (KGZ)	7
Elis Manolova (AZE)	2
Blessing Oborududu (NGR)	13

1/4 finals
Tamyra Mensah-Stock (USA)	10
Zhou Feng (CHN)	0
Alla Cherkasova (UKR)	6^{F}
Anna Schell (GER)	0
Soronzonboldyn Battsetseg (MGL)	8
Khanum Velieva (ROC)	5
Meerim Zhumanazarova (KGZ)	2
Blessing Oborududu (NGR)	3

Semifinals
Tamyra Mensah-Stock (USA)	10
Alla Cherkasova (UKR)	4
Soronzonboldyn Battsetseg (MGL)	2
Blessing Oborududu (NGR)	7

Final
Tamyra Mensah-Stock (USA)	4
Blessing Oborududu (NGR)	1

=== Repechage ===
Repechage
Sara Dosho (JPN)	7
Zhou Feng (CHN)	2
Elis Manolova (AZE)	1
Meerim Zhumanazarova (KGZ)	4

Bronze medal matches
Sara Dosho (JPN)	0
Alla Cherkasova (UKR)	2^{F}
Meerim Zhumanazarova (KGZ)	10^{F}
Soronzonboldyn Battsetseg (MGL)	1

== Final standing ==
Rank	Athlete
1st place, gold medalist(s)	Tamyra Mensah-Stock (USA)
2nd place, silver medalist(s)	Blessing Oborududu (NGR)
3rd place, bronze medalist(s)	Alla Cherkasova (UKR)
3rd place, bronze medalist(s)	Meerim Zhumanazarova (KGZ)
5	Sara Dosho (JPN)
5	Soronzonboldyn Battsetseg (MGL)
7	Zhou Feng (CHN)
8	Khanum Velieva (ROC)
9	Anna Schell (GER)
10	Elis Manolova (AZE)
11	Mimi Hristova (BUL)
12	Yudaris Sánchez (CUB)
13	Koumba Larroque (FRA)
14	Enas Mostafa (EGY)
15	Danielle Lappage (CAN)
16	Agnieszka Wieszczek (POL)
