= Wrestling at the 2018 Asian Games – Women's freestyle 68 kg =

Women's freestyle 68 kg at the 2018 Asian Games
- Venue: Jakarta Convention Center
- Date: 21 August 2018
- Competitors: 12 from 12 nations

Medalists
gold medal	Zhou Feng	China
silver medal	Sharkhüügiin Tümentsetseg	Mongolia
bronze medal	Divya Kakran	India
bronze medal	Meerim Zhumanazarova	Kyrgyzstan

The women's freestyle wrestling 68 kilograms competition at the 2018 Asian Games in Jakarta was held on 21 August 2018 at the Jakarta Convention Center Assembly Hall.

== Schedule ==
All times are Western Indonesia Time (UTC+07:00)

Date	Time	Event
Tuesday, 21 August 2018	13:00	1/8 finals
Tuesday, 21 August 2018	13:00	Quarterfinals
Tuesday, 21 August 2018	13:00	Semifinals
Tuesday, 21 August 2018	13:00	Repechages
Tuesday, 21 August 2018	19:00	Finals

== Results ==
Legend

- F — Won by fall

=== Main bracket ===
1/8 finals
Zhamila Bakbergenova (KAZ)	2
Ayana Gempei (JPN)	5
Zhou Feng (CHN)	5^{F}
Sherin Sultana (BAN)	0
Nattakarn Kaewkhuanchum (THA)	0
Meerim Zhumanazarova (KGZ)	4^{F}
Jang Eun-sil (KOR)	6
Nguyễn Thị Vinh (VIE)	2

Quarterfinals
Sharkhüügiin Tümentsetseg (MGL)	11
Divya Kakran (IND)	1
Desi Sinta (INA)	5
Chen Wen-ling (TPE)	11
Ayana Gempei (JPN)	3
Zhou Feng (CHN)	6
Meerim Zhumanazarova (KGZ)	10
Jang Eun-sil (KOR)	0

Semifinals
Sharkhüügiin Tümentsetseg (MGL)	10
Chen Wen-ling (TPE)	0
Zhou Feng (CHN)	9^{F}
Meerim Zhumanazarova (KGZ)	2

Final
Sharkhüügiin Tümentsetseg (MGL)	1
Zhou Feng (CHN)	4

=== Repechage ===
Repechage round 1
Sherin Sultana (BAN)	0
Ayana Gempei (JPN)	10

Bronze medals
Divya Kakran (IND)	10
Chen Wen-ling (TPE)	0
Ayana Gempei (JPN)	3
Meerim Zhumanazarova (KGZ)	7

== Final standing ==
Rank	Athlete
1st place, gold medalist(s)	Zhou Feng (CHN)
2nd place, silver medalist(s)	Sharkhüügiin Tümentsetseg (MGL)
3rd place, bronze medalist(s)	Divya Kakran (IND)
3rd place, bronze medalist(s)	Meerim Zhumanazarova (KGZ)
5	Chen Wen-ling (TPE)
5	Ayana Gempei (JPN)
7	Jang Eun-sil (KOR)
8	Desi Sinta (INA)
9	Zhamila Bakbergenova (KAZ)
10	Nguyễn Thị Vinh (VIE)
11	Nattakarn Kaewkhuanchum (THA)
12	Sherin Sultana (BAN)
