= Natalia Vorobieva =

Russian wrestler (born 1991)

Natalia Vorobieva Наталья Воробьёва
Personal information
- Full name: Natalia Vitalievna Vorobieva
- Nationality: (Russia) Russian
- Born: 27 May 1991 (age 35) Tulun, Irkutsk oblast, Russian SFSR, Soviet Union (now Russia)

Sport
- Country: Russia
- Sport: Wrestling
- Weight class: 69–72 kg (152–159 lb)
- Event: Freestyle
- Club: Fight Spirit Team
- Coached by: Kamil Djiganchin, Dmitry Gerceglo
Medal record
Women's freestyle wrestling
Representing Russia
Olympic Games
Gold medal – first place	2012 London	72 kg
Silver medal – second place	2016 Rio de Janeiro	69 kg
World Championships
Gold medal – first place	2015 Las Vegas	69 kg
Gold medal – first place	2019 Nur-Sultan	72 kg
Silver medal – second place	2013 Budapest	72 kg
Bronze medal – third place	2014 Tashkent	69 kg
European Games
Bronze medal – third place	2015 Baku	69 kg
European Championships
Gold medal – first place	2013 Tbilisi	72 kg
Gold medal – first place	2014 Vantaa	69 kg
Gold medal – first place	2020 Rome	72 kg
Silver medal – second place	2021 Warsaw	76 kg
Bronze medal – third place	2012 Belgrade	72 kg
Golden Grand Prix Ivan Yarigin
Gold medal – first place	2015 Krasnoyarsk	69 kg
Military World Games
Gold medal – first place	2019 Wuhan	76 kg
World Junior Championships
Gold medal – first place	2009 Ankara	72kg
Gold medal – first place	2010 Hungary	72kg

Natalia Vitalyevna Vorobieva (Russian: Наталья Витальевна Воробьёва; born 27 May 1991) is a Russian retired wrestler, who has won the Olympic, World and European titles.

== Career ==
Vorobieva took up wrestling in her youth, despite some misgivings from her parents. After winning a number of titles at youth level, Vorobieva proceeded to succeed at senior level in the women's -72 kg freestyle division, beginning with a bronze medal at the 2012 European Championship. Vorobieva won an unexpected gold at the 2012 Summer Olympics, where she beat five-time World Champion Stanka Zlateva of Bulgaria to win the gold medal. She was the first Russian to win the -72 kg freestyle title.

In the following, 2013, season, Vorobieva won silver in the women's -72 kg freestyle event at the World Championship, losing in the final to Zhang Fengliu. Vorobieva won the European title, defeating Maider Unda in the final.

Vorobieva dropped into the -69 kg division when the weight categories were changed at the start of the 2014 season. Her first season in her new weight class brought a bronze at the World Championship, and victory at the European Championships (defeating Ilana Kratysh in the final).

In the final of the Golden Grand Prix Ivan Yarygin 2015, Vorobieva defeated Ochirbatyn Nasanburmaa of Mongolia. That year, she also won the World title in the women's -69 kg freestyle division, beating Zhou Feng in the final, and won a bronze medal at the European Games.

At the 2016 Olympic Games, she competed in the -69 kg division, winning a silver medal after losing to Sara Dosho in the final.

Vorobieva moved back up to the -72 kg division. 2019 was a very successful year for Vorobieva. She won the -72 kg freestyle World title, beating Alina Stadnik Makhinia in the final, and the -76 kg title at the 2019 World Military Games, beating Wang Juan of China in the final.

In 2020, Vorobieva won the -72 kg freestyle European title, beating Maria Selmeier in the final. In March 2021, she qualified at the European Qualification Tournament to compete at the 2020 Summer Olympics in Tokyo, Japan. In June 2021, she won one of the bronze medals in her event at the 2021 Poland Open held in Warsaw, Poland.

Vorobyeva has also trained with UFC and M-1 Global MMA fighters, such as Khabib Nurmagomedov, Islam Makhachev, Vyacheslav Vasilevsky, Abubakar Nurmagomedov, Mikhail Malyutin and Ali Bagov.
