= 2016 European Wrestling Championships – Women's freestyle 69 kg =

The women's freestyle 69 kg is a competition featured at the 2016 European Wrestling Championships, and was held in Riga, Latvia on March 11.

== Medalists ==
Gold	Maryia Mamashuk; Belarus
Silver	Ilana Kratysh; Israel
Bronze	Buse Tosun; Turkey
Bronze	Alina Stadnyk; Ukraine

== Results ==
Legend

- F — Won by fall

=== Top half ===
Round of 16
Danutė Domikaitytė (LTU)	6
Laura Skujina (LAT)	2
Tatiana Kolesnikova (RUS)	4
Buse Tosun (TUR)	11
Adina Popescu (ROM)	5
Viktoria Bobeva (BUL)	0
Vanessa Wilson (HUN)	0
Ilana Kratysh (ISR)	10
Alina Stadnyk (UKR)	2^{F}
Jenny Fransson (SWE)	4
Gozal Zutova (AZE)	3
Dalma Caneva (ITA)	5

Quarterfinals
Signe Marie Store (NOR)	0
Maryia Mamashuk (BLR)	8^{F}
Danutė Domikaitytė (LTU)	11
Buse Tosun (TUR)	14^{F}
Adina Popescu (ROM)	3
Ilana Kratysh (ISR)	9^{F}
Alina Stadnyk (UKR)	10^{F}
Dalma Caneva (ITA)	0

Semifinals
Maryia Mamashuk (BLR)	7
Buse Tosun (TUR)	6
Ilana Kratysh (ISR)	9
Alina Stadnyk (UKR)	5

Final
Maryia Mamashuk (BLR)	9
Ilana Kratysh (ISR)	0

=== Repechage ===
Repechage round 2
Vanessa Wilson (HUN)	8
Adina Popescu (ROM)	11

Bronze medals
Signe Marie Store (NOR)	3
Buse Tosun (TUR)	6
Adina Popescu (ROM)	2
Alina Stadnyk (UKR)	12
