= 2013 European Wrestling Championships – Women's freestyle 67 kg =

The women's freestyle 67 kg is a competition featured at the 2013 European Wrestling Championships, and was held at the Tbilisi Sports Palace in Tbilisi, Georgia on 21 March 2013.

== Medalists ==
Gold	Alina Stadnik; Ukraine
Silver	Ilana Kratysh; Israel
Bronze	Aline Focken; Germany
Bronze	Svetlana Babushkina; Russia

== Results ==
Legend

- F — Won by fall

=== Main Draw ===
Round of 16
Dalma Caneva (ITA)	1	0	1
Kitti Godó (HUN)	0	1	0
Aline Focken (GER)	3	5
Martina Kuenz (AUT)	0	0
Halina Leuchanka (BLR)	1	2	7
Kristīne Odriņa-Urbova (LAT)	2	0	0
Svetlana Babushkina (RUS)	2	0	0
Alina Stadnik (UKR)	1	2	4^{F}
Andrea Simon (ROU)	1	4^{F}
Burcu Örskaya (TUR)	0	0
Nataliya Palamarchuk (AZE)	0	2
Daria Osocka (POL)	5	2

Quarterfinals
Ilana Kratysh (ISR)	3	5
Dzhanan Manolova (BUL)	2	0
Dalma Caneva (ITA)	0	1
Aline Focken (GER)	2	2
Halina Leuchanka (BLR)	1	0
Alina Stadnik (UKR)	2	3
Andrea Simon (ROU)	0	1	2
Daria Osocka (POL)	1	0	5

Semifinals
Ilana Kratysh (ISR)	4^{F}
Aline Focken (GER)	1
Alina Stadnik (UKR)	3	4^{F}
Daria Osocka (POL)	0	0

Final
Ilana Kratysh (ISR)	0
Alina Stadnik (UKR)	3^{F}

=== Repechage ===
Repechage round 1
Svetlana Babushkina (RUS)	6	5^{F}
Halina Leuchanka (BLR)	0	0

Bronze medals
Dzhanan Manolova (BUL)	0	3
Aline Focken (GER)	1	5
Svetlana Babushkina (RUS)	1	5^{F}
Daria Osocka (POL)	0	0
