= Sara Dosho =

Japanese wrestler (born 1994)

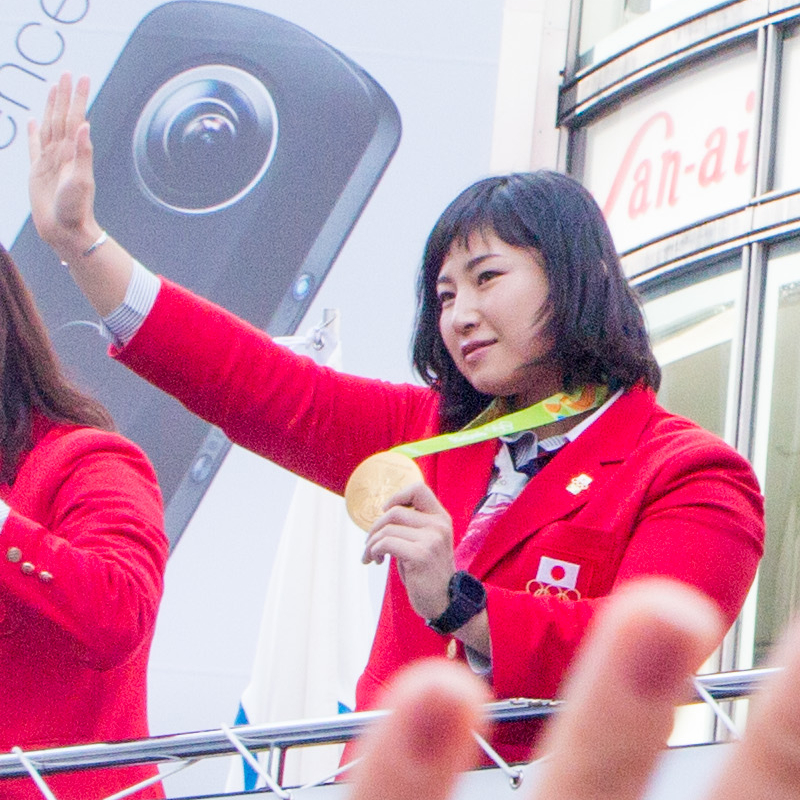
- Dosho in October 2016

Personal information
- Born: October 17, 1994 (age 31) Matsusaka, Mie, Japan
- Height: 159 cm (5 ft 3 in) (2016)
- Weight: 69 kg (152 lb) (2016)

Sport
- Country: Japan
- Sport: Wrestling
- Event: Freestyle
Medal record
Women's freestyle wrestling
Representing Japan
Olympic Games
Gold medal – first place	2016 Rio de Janeiro	69 kg
World Championships
Gold medal – first place	2017 Paris	69 kg
Bronze medal – third place	2015 Las Vegas	69 kg
Silver medal – second place	2014 Tashkent	69 kg
Bronze medal – third place	2013 Budapest	67 kg
Summer Universiade
Gold medal – first place	2013 Kazan	67 kg
Asian Championships
Gold medal – first place	2019 Xian	68 kg
Gold medal – first place	2017 New Delhi	68 kg
Gold medal – first place	2016 Bangkok	68 kg
Gold medal – first place	2014 Astana	69 kg

Sara Dosho (土性 沙羅, Doshō Sara; born October 17, 1994) is a freestyle wrestle and Olympic champion from Japan. She won the gold medal in the women's 69 kg event at the 2016 Summer Olympics held in Rio de Janeiro, Brazil. She also won the gold medal in her event at the 2017 World Wrestling Championships held in Paris, France.

== Career ==
She competes in the 67kg division and won the gold medal at the 2013 Summer Universiade in the same division defeating Ochirbatyn Nasanburmaa of Mongolia in the final. She also won the bronze medal the 2013 World Wrestling Championships. She won the gold medal in women's freestyle (69kg) at the 2016 Olympic Games in Rio de Janeiro.

In 2021, she lost her bronze medal match in the women's 68 kg event at the 2020 Summer Olympics held in Tokyo, Japan.

== Championships and accomplishments ==
- Tokyo Sports
  - Wrestling Special Award (2016, 2017)
