= Karyna Stankova =

Ukrainian freestyle wrestler

Medal record

Representing Ukraine

Women's wrestling

Youth Olympic Games
Bronze medal – third place	2010 Singapore	70 kg

Karyna Stankova is a Ukrainian wrestler who participated at the 2010 Summer Youth Olympics in Singapore. She won the bronze medal in the girls' freestyle 70 kg event.
