= Moon Jin-ju =

South Korean freestyle wrestler

Medal record

Representing South Korea

Women's wrestling

Youth Olympic Games
Silver medal – second place	2010 Singapore	70 kg

Moon Jin-ju is a South Korean wrestler who participated at the 2010 Summer Youth Olympics in Singapore. She won the silver medal in the girls' freestyle 70 kg event, losing to Dorothy Yeats of Canada in the final.
