= 2015 Golden Grand Prix Ivan Yarygin =

Ivan Yarygin 2015
- Host city: Krasnoyarsk, Russia
- Dates: January 22–26
- Stadium: Sport Palace Ivan Yarygin Arena

Champions
- Freestyle: Dagestan
- Women: Russia

The Golden Grand Prix Ivan Yarygin 2015 was held in Krasnoyarsk, Russia between 22 and 26 January 2015. Also known as Ivan Yarygin international

This international tournament included competition in both Freestyle wrestling. This Grand Prix is held in honor of 2-time Olympic Champion Ivan Yarygin.

== Medal overview ==
=== Medal table ===
Rank	Nation	Gold	Silver	Bronze	Total
1	Russia	4	4	5	13
2	Dagestan	3	2	2	7
3	Mongolia	2	3	5	10
4	Belarus	2	0	3	5
5	Chechnya	1	0	4	5
6	Canada	1	0	3	4
7	Sakha Republic	1	0	2	3
8	Buryatia	1	0	1	2
9	Kabardino-Balkaria	1	0	0	1
10	United States	0	2	0	2
11	(North Ossetia–Alania) North Ossetia-Alania	0	1	2	3
12	Japan	0	1	1	2
12	Krasnoyarsk Krai	0	1	1	2
14	Iran	0	1	0	1
14	Kyrgyzstan	0	1	0	1
16	Kazakhstan	0	0	2	2
17	Latvia	0	0	1	1
Totals (17 entries)		16	16	32	64

=== Men's freestyle ===
Event	Gold	Silver	Bronze
57 kg	(Sakha Republic) Viktor Lebedev	(Dagestan) Ismail Musukaev	(Sakha Republic) Nurgun Skryabin
57 kg	(Sakha Republic) Viktor Lebedev	(Dagestan) Ismail Musukaev	(Mongolia) Erdenebatyn Bekhbayar
61 kg	(Buryatia) Aleksandr Bogomoev	(Krasnoyarsk Krai) Nachyn Kuular	(Chechnya) Dzhamal Otarsultanov
61 kg	(Buryatia) Aleksandr Bogomoev	(Krasnoyarsk Krai) Nachyn Kuular	(Sakha Republic) Egor Ponomarev
65 kg	(Dagestan) Ilyas Bekbulatov	(United States) Brent Metcalf	(North Ossetia–Alania) Zaurbek Sidakov
65 kg	(Dagestan) Ilyas Bekbulatov	(United States) Brent Metcalf	(Buryatia) Yevgeny Zherbaev
70 kg	(Chechnya) Rasul Dzhukayev	(Iran) Saeid Dadashpour	(Chechnya) Rasul Arsenaliev
70 kg	(Chechnya) Rasul Dzhukayev	(Iran) Saeid Dadashpour	(Chechnya) Israil Kasumov
74 kg	(Dagestan) Akhmed Gadzhimagomedov	(United States) Andrew Howe	(Chechnya) Isa Daudov
74 kg	(Dagestan) Akhmed Gadzhimagomedov	(United States) Andrew Howe	(Krasnoyarsk Krai) Alexander Zelenkov
86 kg	(Kabardino-Balkaria) Anzor Urishev	(Mongolia) Orgodolyn Üitümen	(Dagestan) Dauren Kurugliev
86 kg	(Kabardino-Balkaria) Anzor Urishev	(Mongolia) Orgodolyn Üitümen	(Dagestan) Akmed Magomedov
97 kg	(Belarus) Ibragim Saidov	(Dagestan) Zaynula Kurbanov	(Krasnoyarsk Krai) Yuri Belonovskiy
97 kg	(Belarus) Ibragim Saidov	(Dagestan) Zaynula Kurbanov	(Kazakhstan) Mamed Ibragimov
125 kg	(Dagestan) Muradin Kushkhov	(North Ossetia–Alania) Alan Khugaev	(Mongolia) Jargalsaikhany Chuluunbat
125 kg	(Dagestan) Muradin Kushkhov	(North Ossetia–Alania) Alan Khugaev	(North Ossetia–Alania) Timur Kotsoev

=== Women's freestyle ===
Event	Gold	Silver	Bronze
48 kg	(Russia) Valentina Islamova-Brik	(Russia) Elena Vostrikova	(Japan) Yu Miyahara
48 kg	(Russia) Valentina Islamova-Brik	(Russia) Elena Vostrikova	(Mongolia) Tsogbaataryn Byambazaya
53 kg	(Russia) Olga Khoroshavtseva	(Japan) Mayu Mukaida	(Mongolia) Erdenechimegiin Sumiyaa
53 kg	(Russia) Olga Khoroshavtseva	(Japan) Mayu Mukaida	(Belarus) Nadegda Sushko
55 kg	(Russia) Irina Ologonova	(Mongolia) Altantsetsegiin Battsetseg	(Belarus) Ekaterina Gonchar
55 kg	(Russia) Irina Ologonova	(Mongolia) Altantsetsegiin Battsetseg	(Mongolia) Batbaataryn Nomin-Erdene
58 kg	(Mongolia) Baatarjavyn Shoovdor	(Kyrgyzstan) Aisuluu Tynybekova	(Kazakhstan) Aim Abdildina
58 kg	(Mongolia) Baatarjavyn Shoovdor	(Kyrgyzstan) Aisuluu Tynybekova	(Canada) Michelle Fazzari
60 kg	(Belarus) Anastasia Guchok	(Russia) Svetlana Lipatova	(Russia) Zhargalma Tsyrenova
60 kg	(Belarus) Anastasia Guchok	(Russia) Svetlana Lipatova	(Russia) Natalya Fedoseeva
63 kg	(Mongolia) Soronzonboldyn Battsetseg	(Russia) Inna Trazhukova	(Latvia) Anastasija Grigorjeva
63 kg	(Mongolia) Soronzonboldyn Battsetseg	(Russia) Inna Trazhukova	(Belarus) Maryia Mamashuk
69 kg	(Russia) Natalia Vorobieva	(Mongolia) Ochirbatyn Nasanburmaa	(Russia) Ksenia Burakova
69 kg	(Russia) Natalia Vorobieva	(Mongolia) Ochirbatyn Nasanburmaa	(Canada) Dorothy Yeats
75 kg	(Canada) Erica Wiebe	(Russia) Alena Starodubtsyeva	(Russia) Ekaterina Bukina
75 kg	(Canada) Erica Wiebe	(Russia) Alena Starodubtsyeva	(Russia) Alena Afanasyeva

== Participating nations ==
204 competitors from 17 (without ethnics & Islamics republics) nations participated.

- Belarus (16)
- Bulgaria (1)
- Canada (6)
- Cyprus (1)
- Finland (1)
- Greece (3)
- Iran (3)
- Japan (15)
- Kazakhstan (42)
- Kyrgyzstan (3)
- Latvia (1)
- Mongolia (47)
- Russia (51) (without ethnics & Islamic republics)
- Turkey (2)
- Tajikistan (2)
- United States (8)
- Uzbekistan (2)
