= Wrestling at the 2014 Asian Games – Women's freestyle 75 kg =

Women's freestyle 75 kg at the 2014 Asian Games
- Venue: Dowon Gymnasium
- Date: 28 September 2014
- Competitors: 7 from 7 nations

Medalists
gold medal	Zhou Feng	China
silver medal	Guzel Manyurova	Kazakhstan
bronze medal	Hwang Eun-ju	South Korea
bronze medal	Ochirbatyn Burmaa	Mongolia

The women's freestyle 75 kilograms wrestling competition at the 2014 Asian Games in Incheon was held on 28 September 2014 at the Dowon Gymnasium.

== Schedule ==
All times are Korea Standard Time (UTC+09:00)

Date	Time	Event
Sunday, 28 September 2014	13:00	Quarterfinals
Sunday, 28 September 2014	13:00	Semifinals
Sunday, 28 September 2014	19:00	Finals

== Results ==
Legend

- F — Won by fall

=== Main bracket ===
Quarterfinals		Semifinals		Gold medal
		Yu Ting (TPE)	2
Guzel Manyurova (KAZ)	7^{F}	Guzel Manyurova (KAZ)	12
Hwang Eun-ju (KOR)	0			Guzel Manyurova (KAZ)	0
Kyoko Hamaguchi (JPN)	1			Zhou Feng (CHN)	11
Zhou Feng (CHN)	2	Zhou Feng (CHN)	3
Jyoti (IND)	0	Ochirbatyn Burmaa (MGL)	2
Ochirbatyn Burmaa (MGL)	10

=== Repechage ===
Bronze medals
Hwang Eun-ju (KOR)	4
Yu Ting (TPE)	0
Kyoko Hamaguchi (JPN)	2
Ochirbatyn Burmaa (MGL)	2

== Final standing ==
Rank	Athlete
1st place, gold medalist(s)	Zhou Feng (CHN)
2nd place, silver medalist(s)	Guzel Manyurova (KAZ)
3rd place, bronze medalist(s)	Hwang Eun-ju (KOR)
3rd place, bronze medalist(s)	Ochirbatyn Burmaa (MGL)
5	Yu Ting (TPE)
5	Kyoko Hamaguchi (JPN)
7	Jyoti (IND)
