= Wrestling at the 2015 European Games – Women's freestyle 69 kg =

Women's freestyle 69 kg at the 2015 European Games
- Venue: Heydar Aliyev Arena
- Date: 15 June
- Competitors: 15 from 15 nations

Medalists
gold medal	Alina Stadnik	Ukraine
silver medal	Ilana Kratysh	Israel
bronze medal	Natalia Vorobieva	Russia
bronze medal	Aline Focken	Germany

Women's freestyle 69 kg competition at the 2015 European Games in Baku, Azerbaijan, took place on 15 June at the Heydar Aliyev Arena.

== Schedule ==
All times are Azerbaijan Summer Time (UTC+05:00)

Date	Time	Event
Monday, 15 June 2015	11:00	1/8 finals
Monday, 15 June 2015	13:00	Quarterfinals
Monday, 15 June 2015	13:00	Semifinals
Monday, 15 June 2015	15:00	Repechage
Monday, 15 June 2015	19:00	Finals

== Results ==
Legend

- F — Won by fall

1/8 finals
(Greece) Maria Louiza Vryoni (GRE)	4
(Belarus) Krystsina Fedarashka (BLR)	2
(Poland) Agnieszka Wieszczek (POL)	7
(Romania) Adina Popescu (ROU)	1
(Azerbaijan) Nadiia Mushka (AZE)	0
(Russia) Natalia Vorobieva (RUS)	7
(Turkey) Burcu Örskaya Üğdüler (TUR)	0
(Germany) Aline Focken (GER)	8
(Sweden) Fanny Gradin (SWE)	10
(Hungary) Vanessa Wilson (HUN)	1
(Lithuania) Danutė Domikaitytė (LTU)	0
(Austria) Martina Kuenz (AUT)	4^{F}
(Ukraine) Alina Stadnik (UKR)	8
(Bulgaria) Dzhanan Manolova (BUL)	0

Quarterfinals
(Israel) Ilana Kratysh (ISR)	8
(Greece) Maria Louiza Vryoni (GRE)	0
(Poland) Agnieszka Wieszczek (POL)	0
(Russia) Natalia Vorobieva (RUS)	2^{F}
(Germany) Aline Focken (GER)	13
(Sweden) Fanny Gradin (SWE)	2
(Austria) Martina Kuenz (AUT)	2
(Ukraine) Alina Stadnik (UKR)	6

Semifinals
(Israel) Ilana Kratysh (ISR)	11
(Russia) Natalia Vorobieva (RUS)	9
(Germany) Aline Focken (GER)	1
(Ukraine) Alina Stadnik (UKR)	4

Final
(Israel) Ilana Kratysh (ISR)	3
(Ukraine) Alina Stadnik (UKR)	7

=== Repechage ===
Repechage round 1
(Bulgaria) Dzhanan Manolova (BUL)	1
(Austria) Martina Kuenz (AUT)	7

Bronze medal match
(Greece) Maria Louiza Vryoni (GRE)	0
(Russia) Natalia Vorobieva (RUS)	8^{F}
(Austria) Martina Kuenz (AUT)	0
(Germany) Aline Focken (GER)	4^{F}
