= Wrestling at the 2010 Summer Youth Olympics – Girls' freestyle 70 kg =

The girls' 70 kg tournament in wrestling at the 2010 Summer Youth Olympics was held on August 16 at the International Convention Centre.

The event limited competitors to a maximum of 70 kilograms of body mass. The tournament had two groups where wrestlers compete in a round-robin format. The winners of each group would go on to play for the gold medal, second placers played for the bronze medal while everyone else played for classification depending on where they ranked in the group stage.

== Medalists ==
Gold	Silver	Bronze
Dorothy Yeats; Canada	Jinju Moon; South Korea	Karyna Stankova; Ukraine

== Group stages ==
=== Group A ===
Athlete	Pld	C. Points	T. Points
Dorothy Yeats (CAN)	3	9	11
Karyna Stankova (UKR)	3	8	8
Martina Kuenz (AUT)	3	7	7
Zsanett Németh (HUN)	3	0	0

Karyna Stankova (UKR)	Fall (3–0)	Zsanett Németh (HUN)
Martina Kuenz (AUT)	0-2 (0-1, 0-1)	Dorothy Yeats (CAN)
Karyna Stankova (UKR)	2-0 (1–0, 3–0)	Martina Kuenz (AUT)
Zsanett Németh (HUN)	0-2 (0-1, 0-4)	Dorothy Yeats (CAN)
Karyna Stankova (UKR)	0-2 (1-3, 0-1)	Dorothy Yeats (CAN)
Zsanett Németh (HUN)	Fall (0-7)	Martina Kuenz (AUT)

=== Group B ===
Athlete	Pld	C. Points	T. Points
Jinju Moon (KOR)	3	10	16
Rimma Kushkenova (KAZ)	3	8	20
Suzan Saeed Ali (POL)	3	4	10
Thoraya Mohamed (EGY)	3	2	11

Thoraya Mohamed (EGY)	0-2 (0-1, 1-3)	Suzan Saeed Ali (POL)
Jinju Moon (KOR)	Fall (3–0)	Rimma Kushkenova (KAZ)
Thoraya Mohamed (EGY)	0-2 (3-5, 0-1)	Jinju Moon (KOR)
Suzan Saeed Ali (POL)	Fall (1-5, 2–0, 0-5)	Rimma Kushkenova (KAZ)
Thoraya Mohamed (EGY)	Fall (4–0, 2-4, 1-6)	Rimma Kushkenova (KAZ)
Suzan Saeed Ali (POL)	1-2 (1-4, 1–0, 1-3)	Jinju Moon (KOR)

== Classification ==
=== 7th-place match ===
Zsanett Németh (HUN)	2-0 (1–0, 3–0)	Thoraya Mohamed (EGY)

=== 5th-place match ===
Martina Kuenz (AUT)	2-0 (2–0, 2–0)	Suzan Saeed Ali (POL)

=== Bronze-medal match ===
Karyna Stankova (UKR)	2-0 (8–0, 5–1)	Rimma Kushkenova (KAZ)

=== Gold-medal match ===
Dorothy Yeats (CAN)	Fall (6–0)	Jinju Moon (KOR)

== Final rankings ==
Rank	Athlete
Gold medal	Dorothy Yeats (CAN)
Silver medal	Jinju Moon (KOR)
Bronze medal	Karyna Stankova (UKR)
4	Rimma Kushkenova (KAZ)
5	Martina Kuenz (AUT)
6	Suzan Saeed Ali (POL)
7	Zsanett Németh (HUN)
8	Thoraya Mohamed (EGY)
