= Stacie Anaka =

Canadian freestyle wrestler

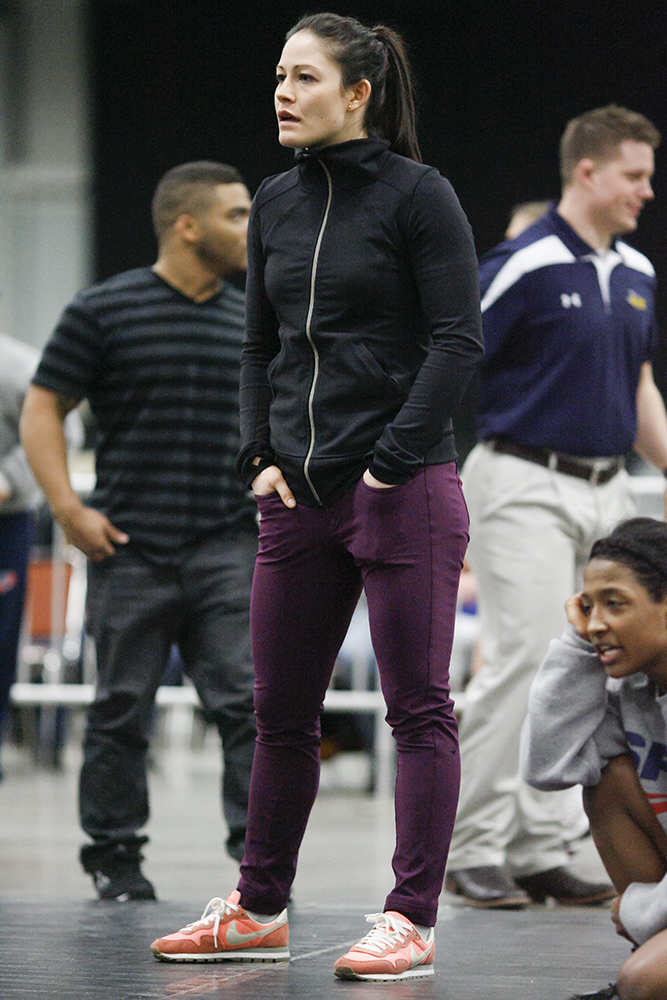

Personal information
- Born: September 5, 1987 (age 38) Canada
- Height: 1.70 m (5 ft 7 in)
- Weight: 70 kg (150 lb; 11 st)

Sport
- Sport: Sport wrestling
- Event: Freestyle
Medal record
Representing Canada
Women's Freestyle Wrestling
World Championships
Silver medal – second place	2013 Budapest	67 kg
Summer Universiade
Bronze medal – third place	2013 Kazan	67 kg

Stacie Anaka is a Canadian freestyle wrestler from Coquitlam, British Columbia. She competes in the 67 kg division. Anaka also serves as an assistant coach for women's wrestling at Simon Fraser University. In 2007, she received the Tom Longboat Award for her outstanding contributions to sports by the Aboriginal Sport Circle.

== Early life ==
Throughout her high school career at Reynolds Secondary school, she also participated in wrestling.

Anaka attended Simon Fraser University on a $20,000 wrestling scholarship. She graduated with a degree in health sciences. During her university career, in the years 2007, 2008 and 2010, she was a national wrestling champion.

== Playing career ==
In July 2013, Anaka competed at the Summer Universiade Games. She won 3-1 for bronze against Azerbaijan's Natalya Palamarchuk.

A few months later, Anaka participated in the 2013 FILA World Wrestling Championships. She triumphed 3–2 over Mongolia's Nasanburmaa Ochirbat, succeeded 9–1 against Gozal Zutova from Azerbaijan, and secured an 8–6 win against Zhangting Zhou of China. She was defeated in the gold medal round by Ukraine's Alina Stadnik-Makhynia; bringing in a silver medal for Canada.

== Awards ==
Stacie was a 2005 head of class honouree at Simon Fraser University.

Anaka won the Pacific National Exhibition bursary in 2007 for not only her athletic accomplishments, but also due to her leadership in the First Nations community. Through teaching and coaching elementary students about wrestling and the many benefits of physical activity, she encourages students to participate in sport.

At the 2014 Sport B.C. Athlete of the Year Banquet which took place in Vancouver, Anaka received the female senior athlete of the year award.

During the celebration of its 50th anniversary in 2017, Reynolds Secondary School, inducted former student athletes like Anaka into their athletic hall of fame.
