= Sherif El Shemerly =

Egyptian volleyball coach

Personal information
- Nationality: Egyptian

Sport
- Sport: Volleyball

Sherif El Shemerly is an Egyptian volleyball coach. He is the Egyptian national volleyball team's coach. He was the coach of the Egyptian men's volleyball team at the 2016 Summer Olympics.
