= Dalma Caneva =

Italian freestyle wrestler

Personal information
- Nationality: Italian
- Born: 6 May 1994 (age 32) Genoa, Italy
- Height: 1.69 m (5 ft 7 in)
- Weight: 67 kg (148 lb)

Sport
- Country: Italy
- Sport: Freestyle wrestling
- Event: 68 kg
- Club: G.S. Esercito
- Coached by: Lucio Caneva
Medal record
Women's freestyle wrestling
Representing Italy
European Championships
Silver medal – second place	2020 Rome	68 kg
Bronze medal – third place	2021 Warsaw	72 kg
Bronze medal – third place	2023 Zagreb	72 kg
Mediterranean Games
Silver medal – second place	2018 Tarragona	68 kg
Bronze medal – third place	2022 Oran	68 kg

Dalma Caneva (born 6 May 1994) is an Italian wrestler who won a silver medal at the 2018 Mediterranean Games. She also won the silver medal in her event at the 2020 European Wrestling Championships held in Rome, Italy.

== Biography ==
Before 2014 Dalma Caneva won five medals at youth level.

In March 2021, she competed at the European Qualification Tournament in Budapest, Hungary hoping to qualify for the 2020 Summer Olympics in Tokyo, Japan. She won her first two matches but then lost her match in the semi-finals against Koumba Larroque of France. In May 2021, she failed to qualify for the Olympics at the World Olympic Qualification Tournament held in Sofia, Bulgaria.

In 2022, she won the bronze medal in the 68 kg event at the Mediterranean Games held in Oran, Algeria. She competed in the 68 kg event at the 2022 World Wrestling Championships held in Belgrade, Serbia.

She won the silver medal in the women's 72 kg event at the 2023 Grand Prix Zagreb Open held in Zagreb, Croatia. She won the gold medal in her event at the 2023 Ibrahim Moustafa Tournament held in Alexandria, Egypt.

Caneva won one of the bronze medals in the 72 kg event at the 2023 European Wrestling Championships held in Zagreb, Croatia. She competed at the 2024 European Wrestling Olympic Qualification Tournament in Baku, Azerbaijan hoping to qualify for the 2024 Summer Olympics in Paris, France. She was eliminated in her first match and she did not qualify for the Olympics. Caneva also competed at the 2024 World Wrestling Olympic Qualification Tournament held in Istanbul, Turkey without qualifying for the Olympics. She was eliminated in her first match.

== Achievements ==
Year	Competition	Venue	Position	Event	Notes
2010	Cadets European Championships	(Bosnia and Herzegovina) Sarajevo	2nd	70 kg	
2011	Cadets European Championships	(Poland) Warsaw	1st	70 kg	
2013	Junior World Championships	(Bulgaria) Sofia	3rd	67 kg	
2013	European Championships	(Georgia (country)) Tbilisi	QF	67 kg	
2013	World Championships	(Hungary) Budapest	Rof32	67 kg	
2014	Junior European Championships	(Poland) Katowice	1st	67 kg	
2014	Junior World Championships	(Croatia) Zagreb	2nd	67 kg	
2014	World Championships	(Uzbekistan) Tashkent	QF	63 kg	
2014	World Military Championships	(United States) Fort Dix	3rd	63 kg	
2015	Mediterranean Championships	(Spain) Madrid	1st	63 kg	
2015	European Games	(Azerbaijan) Baku	Rof16	63 kg	
2015	World Championships	(United States) Las Vegas	Rof32	69 kg	
2016	European Championships	(Latvia) Riga	QF	69 kg	
2018	European Championships	(Russia) Kaspiysk	QF	68 kg	
2018	Mediterranean Games	(Spain) Tarragona	2nd	63 kg	

== National titles ==
- 7 Senior Italian titles

== Participations ==
- 3 Senior World Championships (2013, 2014, 2015)
- 4 Senior European Championships (2013, 2015, 2016, 2018)

== See also ==
- Italy at the 2018 Mediterranean Games
