= Chen Wen-ling =

Taiwanese freestyle wrestler (born 1994)

Chen Wen-ling (born 16 August 1994) is a Taiwanese freestyle wrestler. She competed in the women's freestyle 69 kg event at the 2016 Summer Olympics, in which she was eliminated in the round of 16 by Ochirbatyn Nasanburmaa.
