= Ilana Kratysh =

Israeli freestyle wrestler

Personal information
- Native name: אילנה קרטיש Илана Кратыш Ilana Kratysh
- Nationality: Israeli
- Born: 6 July 1990 (age 36) Israel
- Height: 169 cm (5 ft 7 in)

Sport
- Country: Israel
- Sport: Women's wrestling
- Weight class: 63–69 kilograms (139–152 lb)
Medal record
Women's freestyle wrestling
Representing Israel
European Championships
Silver medal – second place	2013 Tbilisi	67 kg
Silver medal – second place	2014 Vantaa	69 kg
Silver medal – second place	2016 Riga	69 kg
European Games
Silver medal – second place	2015 Baku	69 kg
- Updated on 23 June 2015

Ilana Kratysh (Hebrew: אילנה קרטיש, Russian: Илана Кратыш; born 6 July 1990) is an Israeli freestyle wrestler.

Kratysh placed third at a 2012 Grand Prix Wrestling tournament in Belarus. Kratysh won the silver medal at the European Wrestling Championships in 2013 at 67 kilograms (148 lb), and that year she also won gold medals in the Grand Prix Faltz Open in Austria, Ukraine Grand Prix tournament, and a Grand Prix event in Sassari, Italy. She won the silver medal at the European Wrestling Championships in 2014 at 69 kilograms (152 lb). She also won a silver medal at 69 kg at the Grand Prix of Paris in February 2014. In March 2014, she was ranked third in the world in the 67 kg freestyle rankings.

At the age of 24, Kratysh won a silver medal representing Israel at the 2015 European Games in the women's 69-kilogram freestyle wrestling competition in Baku, Azerbaijan.

== Early and personal life ==
Kratysh was born one hour after her parents Alexander and Galina Kratysh arrived in Israel from St. Petersburg, Russia, in 1990. Her family settled in Haifa, Israel. She had her bat mitzvah in Haifa, Israel, she and her family celebrate Jewish holidays such as Sukkot and Chanukah, and she often attends synagogue.

Her father trained national judo team of Saint Petersburg for five years when he lived in Russia, her brother is a judoka, and she began judo at age five and continued in it for 15 years. However, she suffered a significant judo injury when she was a member of the Israel Defense Forces, and turned to wrestling.

She lives in Haifa, Israel, has served in the Israel Defense Forces, and has completed an instructors course at the Wingate Institute in Netanya. She is also politically active, being a member of the Russian-interest Yisrael Beiteinu party, having been elected to the city council of her hometown Haifa and being on the fifteenth place on Yisrael Beiteinu's list for the election to the 23rd Knesset.

== Wrestling career ==
Kratysh competes in the 63–69 kilograms (139–152 lb) weight classes. In wrestling, she uses her knowledge of judo to compete.

She placed third at a 2012 Grand Prix Wrestling tournament in Belarus. Kratysh won the silver medal at the European Wrestling Championships in 2013 at 67 kilograms (148 lb), behind Ukraine's Alina Stadnik. In February 2013 she won gold medals in the Grand Prix Faltz Open in Austria and in a Ukraine Grand Prix tournament.

While winning a 67 kg Grand Prix event in Sassari, Italy, in June 2013, Kratysh faced Egyptian wrestler Enas Moustafa Youssef Khourshid. In contravention of protocol, Khourshid refused to shake her hand both before and after they competed, and allegedly bit Kratysh on her back during their semifinal match. The Egyptian was immediately suspended by the Fédération Internationale des Luttes Associées (FIL; International Federation of Associated Wrestling Styles; wrestling's governing body), which said it would also fine her. Kratysh's FILA world ranking stood at No. 2 after the event.

Kratysh won the silver medal at the European Wrestling Championships in 2014 at 67 kilograms (148 lb), she lost in the final match to London 2012 Olympic Champion Natalia Vorobieva of Russia. She missed competing in a large part of 2014 with a serious cruciate ligament knee rupture injury and injury that required surgery, and was followed by a long rehabilitation period during which she could not put weight on her foot. She also won a silver medal at 69 kg at the Grand Prix of Paris in February 2014. In March 2014, she was ranked third in the world in the 67 kg freestyle rankings.

At the age of 24, Kratysh won a silver medal representing Israel at the 2015 European Games in the women's 69-kilogram freestyle wrestling competition in Baku, Azerbaijan. She defeated London 2012 Olympic champion and former European champion, Natalia Vorobieva in the semifinals, and lost to Ukrainian Alina Stadnik Makhynia in the finals. She will receive an NIS 28,000 bonus from the Olympic Committee of Israel for her performance. She has met the Israeli requirements for competing in the 2016 Summer Olympics in Rio de Janeiro. Kratysh is the first Israeli woman to wrestle in the Olympics.

In March 2021, Kratysh competed at the European Qualification Tournament in Budapest, Hungary hoping to qualify for the 2020 Summer Olympics in Tokyo, Japan. She competed at the 2024 European Wrestling Olympic Qualification Tournament in Baku, Azerbaijan hoping to qualify for the 2024 Summer Olympics in Paris, France. She was eliminated in her first match and she did not qualify for the Olympics.
