= María Acosta =

Venezuelan freestyle wrestler

Personal information
- Full name: María José Acosta Acosta
- Nationality: Venezuela
- Born: 26 November 1991 (age 34) Venezuela

Sport
- Sport: Wrestling
- Event: Freestyle
Medal record
Representing Venezuela
Women's freestyle wrestling
Pan American Games
Silver medal – second place	2015 Toronto	69 kg
Bronze medal – third place	2023 Santiago	76 kg
South American Games
Silver medal – second place	2022 Asunción	76 kg
Bronze medal – third place	2018 Cochabamba	76 kg
Central American and Caribbean Games
Silver medal – second place	2018 Barranquilla	76 kg
Silver medal – second place	2023 San Salvador	76 kg
Silver medal – second place	2026 Santo Domingo	76 kg
Bronze medal – third place	2014 Veracruz	69 kg
Bolivarian Games
Silver medal – second place	2017 Santa Marta	69 kg
Bronze medal – third place	2022 Valledupar	76 kg
Women's beach wrestling
Central American and Caribbean Beach Games
Silver medal – second place	2022 Santa Marta	+70 kg

María José Acosta Acosta (Note: In this Spanish name, the first or paternal surname is Acosta and the second or maternal family name is Acosta.) (born 26 November 1991) is a Venezuelan freestyle wrestler.

Acosta competed in the women's freestyle 69 kg event at the 2016 Summer Olympics, in which she was eliminated in the round of 16 by Enas Mostafa. She won the silver medal in the women's freestyle 69 kg event at the 2015 Pan American Games.

Acosta won one of the bronze medals in her event at the 2022 Pan American Wrestling Championships held in Acapulco, Mexico. She won the bronze medal in her event at the 2022 Bolivarian Games held in Valledupar, Colombia. She won the silver medal in her event at the 2022 South American Games held in Asunción, Paraguay.

In 2023, Acosta lost her bronze medal match in her event at the Pan American Wrestling Championships held in Buenos Aires, Argentina. She won the silver medal in her event at the 2023 Central American and Caribbean Games held in San Salvador, El Salvador. She was eliminated in her first match in the 76 kg event at the 2023 World Wrestling Championships held in Belgrade, Serbia. Acosta won one of the bronze medals in her event at the 2023 Pan American Games held in Santiago, Chile.

Acosta competed at the 2024 Pan American Wrestling Olympic Qualification Tournament held in Acapulco, Mexico hoping to qualify for the 2024 Summer Olympics in Paris, France. She was eliminated in her second match by Génesis Reasco of Ecuador. Acosta also competed at the 2024 World Wrestling Olympic Qualification Tournament held in Istanbul, Turkey without qualifying for the Olympics. She was eliminated in her first match.
