= Enas Mostafa =

Egyptian freestyle wrestler

Personal information
- Full name: Enas Mostafa Youssef Khourshed Ahmed
- Born: 1 January 1989 (age 37) Alexandria, Egypt
- Height: 165 cm (5 ft 5 in)

Sport
- Country: Egypt
- Sport: Women's freestyle wrestling
- Weight class: 69 kg
Medal record
African Games
Gold medal – first place	2015 Brazzaville	69 kg
African Championships
Gold medal – first place	2013 N'Djamena	67 kg
Gold medal – first place	2014 Tunis	69 kg
Gold medal – first place	2015 Alexandria	69 kg
Silver medal – second place	2010 Cairo	67 kg
Bronze medal – third place	2009 Casablanca	72 kg
Bronze medal – third place	2011 Dakar	63 kg
Bronze medal – third place	2012 Marrakesh	59 kg

Enas Mostafa Youssef Khourshed Ahmed (Arabic: ايناس مصطفى يوسف خورشيد أحمد, born 1 January 1989), known as Enas Mostafa or Enas Ahmed, is an Egyptian freestyle wrestler.

She competed at the 2016 Summer Olympics in Rio de Janeiro, in the women's freestyle 69 kg. She finished in 5th place after losing to Natalia Vorobieva of Russia in the semifinals.

She competed at the 2020 Summer Olympics in the women's 68 kg event.
