= Laura Skujiņa =

Latvian sport wrestler (born 1987)

Medal record

Women's freestyle wrestling

Representing Latvia

World Championships
Bronze medal – third place	2014 Tashkent	69 kg

Laura Skujiņa (born July 10, 1987) is a female wrestler from Latvia. She won the bronze medal the 2014 World Wrestling Championships.
