= Gilda Oliveira =

Brazilian freestyle wrestler

Personal information
- Full name: Gilda Maria de Oliveira
- Born: 6 August 1983 (age 42) Rio de Janeiro, Brazil
- Height: 169 cm (5 ft 7 in)
- Weight: 69 kg (152 lb)

Sport
- Sport: Freestyle wrestling
Medal record
Representing Brazil
South American Games
Gold medal – first place	2014 Santiago	69 kg

Gilda Maria de Oliveira (born 6 August 1983) is a Brazilian freestyle wrestler.

She competed at the 2016 Summer Olympics in Rio de Janeiro, in the women's freestyle 69 kg, of which she was eliminated in the quarterfinals. Gilda finished second in the 2016 Pan American Wrestling Championships, qualifying for the Olympics. Previously, she won gold at the 2014 South American Games in Santiago, Chile. She also won the silver medal at the 2010 South American Games in Medellín, Colombia.
