= Elmira Syzdykova =

Kazakhstani sport wrestler

Elmira Syzdyqova
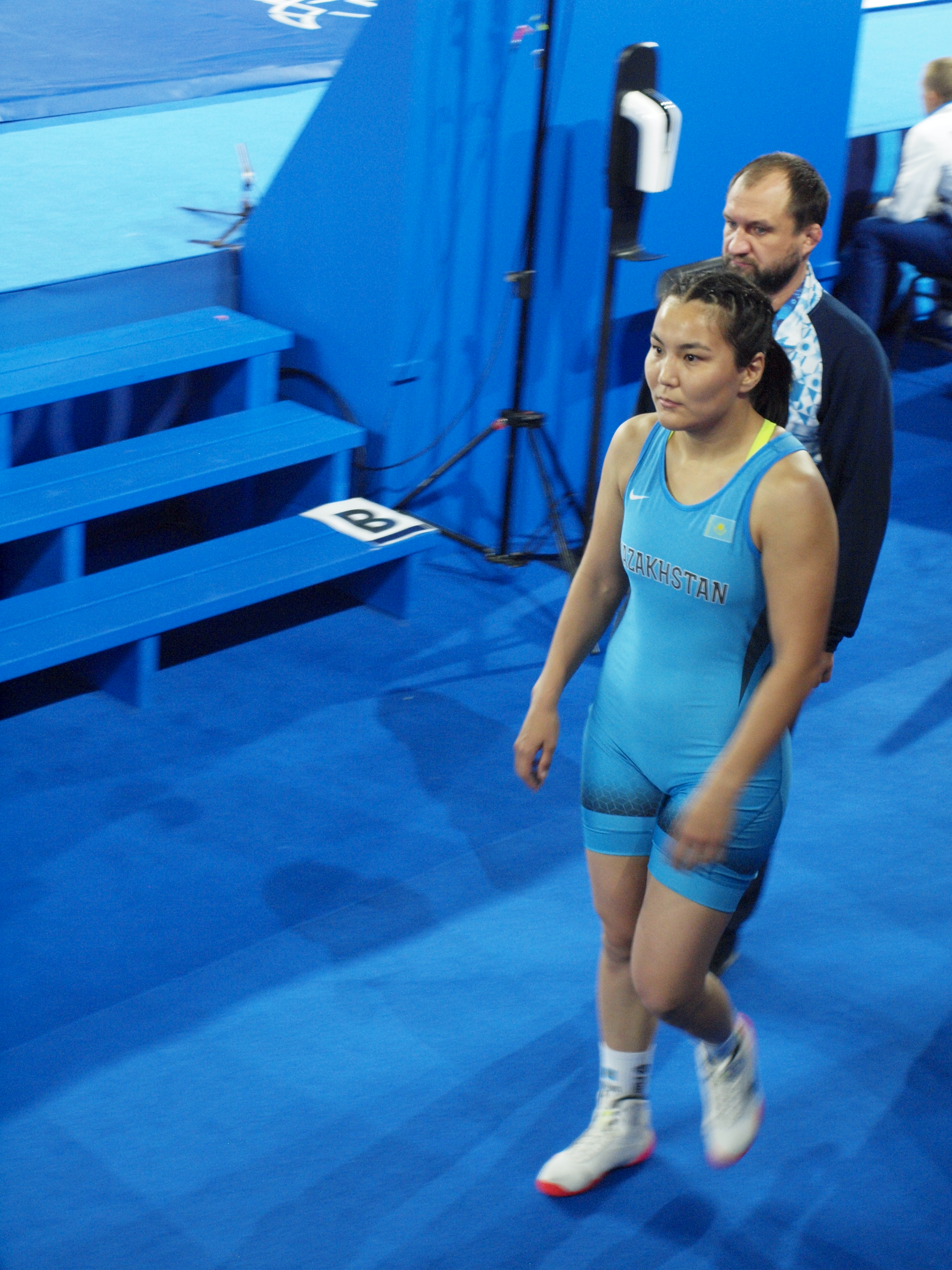
- Syzdykova in 2021

Personal information
- Native name: Эльмира Әнуарбекқызы Сыздықова
- Born: 5 February 1992 (age 34) North Kazakhstan Region, Kazakhstan
- Height: 172 cm (5 ft 8 in)
- Weight: 76 kg (168 lb)
Medal record
Women's freestyle wrestling
Representing Kazakhstan
Olympic Games
Bronze medal – third place	2016 Rio de Janeiro	69 kg
Asian Championships
Gold medal – first place	2021 Almaty	76 kg
Gold medal – first place	2023 Astana	76 kg
Silver medal – second place	2015 Doha	69 kg
Silver medal – second place	2016 Bangkok	69 kg
Bronze medal – third place	2014 Astana	69 kg
Bronze medal – third place	2018 Bishkek	76 kg
Bronze medal – third place	2020 New Delhi	76 kg
Bronze medal – third place	2024 Bishkek	76 kg
Asian Games
Bronze medal – third place	2018 Jakarta	76 kg
Islamic Solidarity Games
Bronze medal – third place	2025 Riyadh	76 kg
Asian Indoor Games
Silver medal – second place	2017 Ashgabat	69 kg
Yasar Dogu Tournament
Silver medal – second place	2024 Antalya	76 kg
Silver medal – second place	2025 Kocaeli	76 kg
Golden Grand Prix Ivan Yarygin
Gold medal – first place	2022 Krasnoyarsk	76 kg
Grand Prix
Bronze medal – third place	2025 Tirana	76 kg
Bronze medal – third place	2025 Budapest	76 kg
World Junior Championships
Bronze medal – third place	2011 Bucharest	72 kg

Elmira Änuarbekqyzy Syzdyqova (Note: Often transliterated as Elmira Anuarbekovna Syzdykova through a Russified Romanization of Эльмира Ануарбековна Сыздыкова.) (Kazakh: Эльмира Әнуарбекқызы Сыздықова; born 5 February 1992) is a Kazakh wrestler. She represented her country at the 2016 Summer Olympics and won a bronze medal in the 69 kg category. She has won several medals at the Asian Championships.

== Career ==
In 2021, Syzdykova won one of the bronze medals in the 76 kg event at the Matteo Pellicone Ranking Series 2021 held in Rome, Italy. A month later, she secured the gold medal in her event at the 2021 Asian Wrestling Championships held in Almaty, Kazakhstan.

In 2022, Syzdykova won the gold medal in the women's 76 kg event at the Golden Grand Prix Ivan Yarygin held in Krasnoyarsk, Russia.

She won the gold medal in the women's 76 kg event at the Grand Prix de France Henri Deglane 2023 held in Nice, France. She won one of the bronze medals in her event at the 2023 Ibrahim Moustafa Tournament held in Alexandria, Egypt.

Syzdykova won the gold medal in her event at the 2023 Asian Wrestling Championships held in Astana, Kazakhstan. She won one of the bronze medals in her event at the 2024 Asian Wrestling Championships held in Bishkek, Kyrgyzstan. Syzdykova competed at the 2024 World Wrestling Olympic Qualification Tournament held in Istanbul, Turkey without qualifying for the 2024 Summer Olympics in Paris, France. She was eliminated in her first match.

== Achievements ==
Year	Tournament	Location	Result	Event
2016	2016 Rio Olympics	Rio de Janeiro, Brazil	3rd	Freestyle 69 kg
2018	Asian Games	Jakarta, Indonesia	3rd	Freestyle 76 kg
2018	Asian Championships	Bishkek, Kyrgyzstan	3rd	Freestyle 76 kg
2020	Asian Championships	New Delhi, India	3rd	Freestyle 76 kg
2021	Asian Championships	Almaty, Kazakhstan	1st	Freestyle 76 kg
2023	Asian Championships	Astana, Kazakhstan	1st	Freestyle 76 kg
2024	Asian Championships	Bishkek, Kyrgyzstan	3rd	Freestyle 76 kg
