= Zhou Feng =

Chinese freestyle wrestler

Personal information
- National team: China
- Born: 12 September 1993 (age 32) Nanchang, Jiangxi, China
- Height: 175 cm (5 ft 9 in)
- Weight: 70 kg (154 lb; 11 st 0 lb)

Sport
- Country: China
- Sport: Wrestling
- Club: Liaoning Wrestling Club
Medal record
Women's freestyle wrestling
Representing China
World Championships
| Silver medal – second place | 2015 Las Vegas | 69 kg |
| Bronze medal – third place | 2018 Budapest | 68 kg |
Asian Games
| Gold medal – first place | 2014 Incheon | 75 kg |
| Gold medal – first place | 2018 Jakarta-Palembang | 68 kg |
| Gold medal – first place | 2022 Hangzhou | 68 kg |
Asian Championships
| Gold medal – first place | 2015 Doha | 69 kg |
| Gold medal – first place | 2018 Bishkek | 68 kg |
| Silver medal – second place | 2014 Astana | 75 kg |
| Silver medal – second place | 2019 Xi'an | 68 kg |
| Bronze medal – third place | 2017 New Delhi | 69 kg |
| Bronze medal – third place | 2023 Astana | 68 kg |

Zhou Feng (Chinese: 周凤) is a freestyle wrestler from China. She competes in the 75 kg division and won the gold medal in the same division at the 2014 Asian Games.

She won the gold medal in the women's 68 kg event at the 2022 Asian Games held in Hangzhou, China. She defeated Nurzat Nurtaeva of Kyrgyzstan in her gold medal match.
