= Dorothy Yeats =

Canadian freestyle wrestler

Personal information
- Full name: Dorothy Erzsebet Yeats
- Nickname: Dori
- Nationality: Canadian
- Born: 29 July 1993 (age 33) Montreal, Quebec, Canada
- Height: 164 cm (5 ft 5 in)
- Weight: 69 kg (152 lb)

Sport
- Sport: Freestyle wrestling
- Club: Quebec Wrestling Academy
- Coached by: Doug Yeats
Medal record
Women's freestyle wrestling
Representing Canada
World Championships
Silver medal – second place	2012 Strathcona County	67 kg
Commonwealth Games
Gold medal – first place	2014 Glasgow	69 kg
Pan American Games
Gold medal – first place	2015 Toronto	69 kg
Golden Grand Prix Ivan Yarygin
Bronze medal – third place	2015 Krasnoyarsk	69 kg
Youth Olympic Games
Gold medal – first place	2010 Singapore	70 kg

Dorothy Yeats (born 29 July 1993) is a Canadian wrestler and Commonwealth Games champion. She won gold at the 2014 Commonwealth Games.

Daughter of five-time Olympian Doug Yeats, who won gold at the 1979 Pan American Games, Dorothy participated at the 2010 Summer Youth Olympics in Singapore. She won the gold medal in the girls' freestyle 70 kg event, defeating Jinju Moon of South Korea in the final. In 2012, she faced Adeline Gray of USA in the gold medal match at the world championship. Although she was defeated, the 19-year-old walked away with a silver medal. She in also the 2012 and 2013 Junior World Champion at 67 kg.

In July 2016, she was officially named to Canada's 2016 Olympic team.

== Championships ==
- 9X Canadian National Champion (60 kg–69 kg)
- 2009 Canada Games Champion at 65 kg
- 2010 Junior Pan American Champion & Cadet Pan American Champion at 63 kg
- 2010 Youth Olympic Games Champion at 70 kg
- 2011 Commonwealth Champion at 63 kg
- 2012 Junior World Champion
- 2012 Senior World Silver Medalist
- 2013 Junior World Champion
- 2014 Commonwealth Games Champion
- 2014 University World Champion
- 2015 Pan American Games Champion (69 kg)
