= Alina Berezhna =

Ukrainian sport wrestler

Personal information
- Native name: Аліна В'ячеславівна Бережна
- Full name: Alina Vyacheslavivna Berezhna
- Born: 3 January 1991 (age 35) Chita, Zabaykalsky Krai, Russian SFSR, Soviet Union
Medal record
Women's freestyle wrestling
Representing Ukraine
World Championships
Gold medal – first place	2013 Budapest	67 kg
Silver medal – second place	2019 Nur-Sultan	72 kg
European Championships
Gold medal – first place	2013 Tbilisi	67 kg
Gold medal – first place	2019 Bucharest	72 kg
Bronze medal – third place	2020 Rome	72 kg
Silver medal – second place	2011 Dortmund	67 kg
Bronze medal – third place	2014 Vantaa	69 kg
Bronze medal – third place	2016 Riga	69 kg
Individual World Cup
Bronze medal – third place	2020 Belgrade	68 kg
European Games
Gold medal – first place	2015 Baku	69 kg
Summer Universiade
Bronze medal – third place	Kazan 2013	67 kg
Junior World Championships
Gold medal – first place	2009 Ankara	67 kg
Women's beach wrestling
World Beach Games
Silver medal – second place	2019 Doha	70 kg

Alina Vyacheslavivna Berezhna (formerly Stadnyk, née Makhynia, Ukrainian: Аліна В'ячеславівна Бережна (Стадник, Махиня); born 3 January 1991) is a Ukrainian freestyle wrestler. She is the 2013 World champion in women's freestyle 67 kg.

== Personal life ==
Makhynia was born on 3 January 1991 in Chita, Zabaykalsky Krai, Russia. She moved to Ukraine in 1994.

== Career ==
Competing in the freestyle 67 kg category, Stadnyk won gold at the 2009 World Junior Championships in Ankara and the 2013 European Championships in Tbilisi. In September 2013, she was awarded gold at the World Championships in Budapest, after defeating Stacie Anaka of Canada.

In 2014, Stadnyk began appearing in 69 kg freestyle. She took bronze at the 2014 European Championships in Vantaa and gold at the 2015 European Games in Baku, defeating Israeli Ilana Kratysh in the finals.

She competed for Ukraine at the 2016 Summer Olympics in the women's freestyle 69 kg event.

She represented Ukraine at the 2019 World Beach Games in Doha, Qatar and she won the silver medal in the women's 70 kg beach wrestling event.

In 2020, she won one of the bronze medals in the women's 68 kg event at the Individual Wrestling World Cup held in Belgrade, Serbia.
