= Ochirbatyn Nasanburmaa =

Mongolian wrestler (born 1989)

Ochirbat Nasanburmaa
Personal information
- Nationality: (Mongolia) Mongol
- Born: 14 April 1989 (age 37) Ulaanbaatar, Mongolia
- Height: 1.68 m (5 ft 6 in)

Sport
- Sport: Wrestling
- Event: Freestyle
- Club: Huch
Medal record
Women's freestyle wrestling
Representing Mongolia
World Championships
Silver medal – second place	2018 Budapest	72 kg
Bronze medal – third place	2008 Tokyo	67 kg
Bronze medal – third place	2011 Istanbul	63 kg
Bronze medal – third place	2013 Budapest	67 kg
FILA World Team Championships
Silver medal – second place	2013 Ulaanbaatar	67 kg
Bronze medal – third place	2015 Saint Petersburg	69 kg
Bronze medal – third place	2017 Cheboksary	75 kg
Bronze medal – third place	2018 Takasaki	72 kg
Asian Games
Silver medal – second place	2010 Guangzhou	63 kg
Asian Championships
Gold medal – first place	2013 New Delhi	67 kg
Silver medal – second place	2008 Jeju City	67 kg
Silver medal – second place	2018 Bishkek	72 kg
Bronze medal – third place	2004 Tokyo	63 kg
Golden Grand Prix Ivan Yarygin
Silver medal – second place	2015 Krasnoyarsk	69 kg
Silver medal – second place	2017 Krasnoyarsk	69 kg
Bronze medal – third place	2018 Krasnoyarsk	72 kg
Bronze medal – third place	2020 Krasnoyarsk	68 kg

Ochirbat Nasanburmaa (born 14 April 1989) is a female wrestler from Mongolia.
