= Reetika Hooda =

Indian freestyle wrestler

Personal information
- Born: 31 August 2002 (age 23) Rohtak, Haryana, India
- Military career
- Branch: Indian Navy
- Rank: Chief Petty Officer

Sport
- Sport: Wrestling
- Weight class: 76 kg
- Event: Freestyle
Medal record
Women's freestyle wrestling
Representing India
Asian Championships
Silver medal – second place	2025 Amman	76kg
Bronze medal – third place	2023 Astana	72kg
Grand Prix
Gold medal – first place	2025 Ulaanbaatar	76kg
Silver medal – second place	2024 Budapest	76kg
Silver medal – second place	2023 Bishkek	72kg
Bronze medal – third place	2023 Alexandria	72kg
World Military Championships
Gold medal – first place	2024 Yerevan	76kg
Gold medal – first place	2025 Warendorf	76kg
U23 World Championships
Gold medal – first place	2023 Tirana	76kg
U23 Asian Championships
Gold medal – first place	2022 Bishkek	72kg
U20 World Championships
Bronze medal – third place	2022 Sofia	72kg
U17 Asian Championships
Bronze medal – third place	2019 Nur-Sultan	69kg

Reetika Hooda (born 31 August 2002) is an Indian freestyle wrestler.

== Early life ==
Reetika Hooda was born in Rohtak district, Haryana. Her father Jagbir Singh is a farmer and her mother Neelam is a housewife. She showed an early interest in wrestling, participating in local competitions from a young age.

== Career ==
Reetika won a bronze medal in the women's 72 kg event at the 2023 Ibrahim Moustafa Wrestling Ranking Series in Egypt. She also won a bronze medal at the 2023 Asian Wrestling Championships.

In October 2023, she became the first Indian female wrestler to win the gold medal at the U23 World Championships.

She competed at the 2024 Asian Wrestling Olympic Qualification Tournament in Bishkek, Kyrgyzstan and earned a quota place for India for the 2024 Summer Olympics in Paris, France. She became the first Indian Women to qualify to the Olympics in the 76 kg category

== Senior career results ==
Res.	Record	Opponent	Score	Date	Event	Location
(silver) Silver Medal at 76 kg
Win	13-7	Génesis Reasco (ECU)	7-0	8 June 2024	2024 Polyák Imre & Varga János Memorial Tournament	(Hungary) Budapest
Win	12-7	Zaineb Sghaier (TUN)	10-0	8 June 2024	2024 Polyák Imre & Varga János Memorial Tournament	(Hungary) Budapest
Loss	11-7	Tatiana Rentería (COL)	3-6	8 June 2024	2024 Polyák Imre & Varga János Memorial Tournament	(Hungary) Budapest
Win	11-6	Justina Di Stasio (CAN)	11-0	8 June 2024	2024 Polyák Imre & Varga János Memorial Tournament	(Hungary) Budapest
Qualified 1st at 76 kg
Win	10-6	Chang Hui-tsz (TPE)	7-0	20 April 2024	2024 Asian Wrestling Olympic Qualification Tournament	(Kyrgyzstan) Bishkek
Win	9-6	Wang Juan (CHN)	9-6	20 April 2024	2024 Asian Wrestling Olympic Qualification Tournament	(Kyrgyzstan) Bishkek
Win	8-6	Enkh-Amaryn Davaanasan (MGL)	11-0	20 April 2024	2024 Asian Wrestling Olympic Qualification Tournament	(Kyrgyzstan) Bishkek
Win	7-6	Hwang Eun-ju (KOR)	10-0	20 April 2024	2024 Asian Wrestling Olympic Qualification Tournament	(Kyrgyzstan) Bishkek
(silver) Silver Medal at 72 kg
Loss	6-6	Zhamila Bakbergenova (KAZ)	0-7	3 June 2023	2023 Kaba Uulu Kozhomkul & Raatbek Sanatbaev Tournament	(Kyrgyzstan) Bishkek
Win	6-5	Dalma Caneva (ITA)	10-0	3 June 2023	2023 Kaba Uulu Kozhomkul & Raatbek Sanatbaev Tournament	(Kyrgyzstan) Bishkek
(bronze) Bronze Medal at 72 kg
Win	5-5	Svetlana Oknazarova (UZB)	8-2	12 April 2023	2023 Asian Wrestling Championships	(Kazakhstan) Astana
Loss	4-5	Sumire Niikura (JPN)	5-8	12 April 2023	2023 Asian Wrestling Championships	(Kazakhstan) Astana
Win	4-4	Nurzat Nurtaeva (KAZ)	9-4	12 April 2023	2023 Asian Wrestling Championships	(Kazakhstan) Astana
(bronze) Bronze Medal at 72 kg
Win	3-4	Lilly Schneider (GER)	14-0	24 - 25 February 2023	2023 Ibrahim Moustafa Tournament	(Egypt) Alexandria
Loss	2-4	Dalma Caneva (ITA)	1-7, Fall	24 - 25 February 2023	2023 Ibrahim Moustafa Tournament	(Egypt) Alexandria
Win	2-3	Lilly Schneider (GER)	14-0	24 - 25 February 2023	2023 Ibrahim Moustafa Tournament	(Egypt) Alexandria
Win	1-3	Svetlana Oknazarova (UZB)	17-3	24 - 25 February 2023	2023 Ibrahim Moustafa Tournament	(Egypt) Alexandria
Tied 6th at 72 kg
Loss	0-3	Elizabeth Grotte (USA)	0-7	4 February 2023	2022 Grand Prix Zagreb Open	(Croatia) Zagreb
Loss	0-2	Sumire Niikura (JPN)	5-7	4 February 2023	2022 Grand Prix Zagreb Open	(Croatia) Zagreb
Tied 11th at 72 kg
Loss	0-1	Kendra Dacher (FRA)	3-9	14 - 15 September 2022	2022 World Wrestling Championships	(Serbia) Belgrade
