= 2026 World Wrestling Championships – Women's freestyle 76 kg =

World Wrestling Competition

Women's freestyle 76 kg at the 2026 World Championships
- Venue: Barys Arena
- Dates: 27–28 October 2026
- Competitors: 20 from 20 nations

Medalists
gold medal	Anastasiya Alpyeyeva	Ukraine
silver medal	Kajal Dhochak	India
bronze medal	Enkh-Amaryn Davaanasan	Mongolia
bronze medal	Dymond Guilford	United States

The women's freestyle 76 kilograms is a competition featured at the 2026 World Wrestling Championships, and was held in Astana, Kazakhstan on 27 and 28 October 2026.

This freestyle wrestling competition consists of a single-elimination tournament, with a repechage used to determine the winner of two bronze medals. The two finalists face off for gold and silver medals. Each wrestler who loses to one of the two finalists moves into the repechage, culminating in a pair of bronze medal matches, featuring the semifinal losers each facing the remaining repechage opponent from their half of the bracket.

== Results ==
Legend

- F — Won by fall

=== Final ===
Final
Kajal Dhochak (IND)	6
Anastasiya Alpyeyeva (UKR)	8

=== Top half ===
Round of 32
Martina Kuenz (AUT)	10
Nyla Burgess (CAN)	0
Kamilė Griškienė (LTU)	4
Yasuha Matsuyuki (JPN)	2

Round of 16
Aiperi Medet Kyzy (KGZ)	10^{F}
Samar Amer (EGY)	6
Martina Kuenz (AUT)	9
Li Wenji (CHN)	4
Kajal Dhochak (IND)	5^{F}
Kamilė Griškienė (LTU)	0
Mariia Silina (RUS)	2
Enkh-Amaryn Davaanasan (MGL)	11

Quarterfinals
Aiperi Medet Kyzy (KGZ)	3
Martina Kuenz (AUT)	3
Kajal Dhochak (IND)	9
Enkh-Amaryn Davaanasan (MGL)	2

Semifinals
Aiperi Medet Kyzy (KGZ)	7
Kajal Dhochak (IND)	10

=== Bottom half ===
Round of 32
Kendra Dacher (FRA)	3
Lilly Schneider (GER)	0
Ozoda Zaripboeva (UZB)	0
Dymond Guilford (USA)	10^{F}

Round of 16
Milaimys Marín (CUB)	4
Kadriye Aksoy Koçak (TUR)	14
Kendra Dacher (FRA)	0
Gulmaral Yerkebayeva (KAZ)	7
Damola Ojo (NGR)	2
Dymond Guilford (USA)	12
Anastasiya Zimiankova (BLR)	1
Anastasiya Alpyeyeva (UKR)	8^{F}

Quarterfinals
Kadriye Aksoy Koçak (TUR)	12
Gulmaral Yerkebayeva (KAZ)	8
Dymond Guilford (USA)	4
Anastasiya Alpyeyeva (UKR)	6

Semifinals
Kadriye Aksoy Koçak (TUR)	0
Anastasiya Alpyeyeva (UKR)	11

=== Repechage ===
Repechage round 2
Kamilė Griškienė (LTU)	0
Enkh-Amaryn Davaanasan (MGL)	10
Anastasiya Zimiankova (BLR)	0
Dymond Guilford (USA)	12

Bronze medals
Enkh-Amaryn Davaanasan (MGL)	4
Aiperi Medet Kyzy (KGZ)	1
Dymond Guilford (USA)	7
Kadriye Aksoy Koçak (TUR)	2

== Final standing ==
Rank	Athlete
1st place, gold medalist(s)	Anastasiya Alpyeyeva (UKR)
2nd place, silver medalist(s)	Kajal Dhochak (IND)
3rd place, bronze medalist(s)	Enkh-Amaryn Davaanasan (MGL)
3rd place, bronze medalist(s)	Dymond Guilford (USA)
5	Aiperi Medet Kyzy (KGZ)
5	Kadriye Aksoy Koçak (TUR)
7	Martina Kuenz (AUT)
8	Gulmaral Yerkebayeva (KAZ)
9	Kamilė Griškienė (LTU)
10	Kendra Dacher (FRA)
11	Li Wenji (CHN)
12	Milaimys Marín (CUB)
13	Yasuha Matsuyuki (JPN)
14	Mariia Silina (RUS)
15	Damola Ojo (NGR)
16	Samar Amer (EGY)
17	Anastasiya Zimiankova (BLR)
18	Lilly Schneider (GER)
19	Nyla Burgess (CAN)
20	Ozoda Zaripboeva (UZB)
