= 2018 World Wrestling Championships – Women's freestyle 72 kg =

Women's freestyle 72 kg at the 2018 World Championships
- Venue: László Papp Budapest Sports Arena
- Dates: 23–24 October 2018
- Competitors: 17 from 17 nations

Medalists
gold medal	Justina Di Stasio	Canada
silver medal	Ochirbatyn Nasanburmaa	Mongolia
bronze medal	Martina Kuenz	Austria
bronze medal	Buse Tosun	Turkey

The women's freestyle 72 kilograms is a competition featured at the 2018 World Wrestling Championships, and was held in Budapest, Hungary on 23 and 24 October.

This freestyle wrestling competition consists of a single-elimination tournament, with a repechage used to determine the winner of two bronze medals. The two finalists face off for gold and silver medals. Each wrestler who loses to one of the two finalists moves into the repechage, culminating in a pair of bronze medal matches featuring the semifinal losers each facing the remaining repechage opponent from their half of the bracket.

== Results ==
Legend

- F — Won by fall

=== Final ===
Final
Justina Di Stasio (CAN)	4
Ochirbatyn Nasanburmaa (MGL)	2

=== Top half ===
Round of 32

Round of 16
Alexandra Anghel (ROU)	0
Justina Di Stasio (CAN)	10
Martina Kuenz (AUT)	2^{F}
Rajni Bisht (IND)	0
Naruha Matsuyuki (JPN)	4
Maria Selmaier (GER)	1
Samar Amer (EGY)	6
Zhamila Bakbergenova (KAZ)	4

Quarterfinals
Justina Di Stasio (CAN)	6
Martina Kuenz (AUT)	3
Naruha Matsuyuki (JPN)	1
Samar Amer (EGY)	12

Semifinals
Justina Di Stasio (CAN)	6
Samar Amer (EGY)	0

=== Bottom half ===
Round of 32
Anastasiya Zimiankova (BLR)	2
Erin Clodgo (USA)	5

Round of 16
Agnieszka Wieszczek (POL)	1
Buse Tosun (TUR)	8^{F}
Nikoletta Szmolka (HUN)	0
Ochirbatyn Nasanburmaa (MGL)	10
Wang Juan (CHN)	12
Alla Belinska (UKR)	1
Erin Clodgo (USA)	4
Tatiana Kolesnikova (RUS)	6

Quarterfinals
Buse Tosun (TUR)	6
Ochirbatyn Nasanburmaa (MGL)	7
Wang Juan (CHN)	11
Tatiana Kolesnikova (RUS)	0

Semifinals
Ochirbatyn Nasanburmaa (MGL)	6^{F}
Wang Juan (CHN)	0

=== Repechage ===
Repechage round 2
Alexandra Anghel (ROU)	0
Martina Kuenz (AUT)	4^{F}
Nikoletta Szmolka (HUN)	0
Buse Tosun (TUR)	10

Bronze medals
Martina Kuenz (AUT)	2
Samar Amer (EGY)	1
Buse Tosun (TUR)	5
Wang Juan (CHN)	2
