= 2026 European Wrestling Championships – Women's freestyle 76 kg =

Wrestling competition held in Tirana, Albania

Women's freestyle 76 kg at the 2026 European Wrestling Championships
- Venue: Tirana Olympic Park
- Location: Tirana, Albania
- Dates: 22–23 April
- Competitors: 13 from 11 nations

Medalists
gold medal	Anastasiya Alpyeyeva	Ukraine
silver medal	Alexandra Anghel	Romania
bronze medal	Martina Kuenz	Austria
bronze medal	Kendra Dacher	France

The women's freestyle 76 kilograms competition at the 2026 European Wrestling Championships was held from 22 to 23 April 2026 at the Tirana Olympic Park in Tirana, Albania.

== Results ==
Legend

- F — Won by fall

=== Main bracket ===
Round of 16
Valeriia Trifonova (UWW)	11
Fani Nađ (SRB)	0
Anastasiya Zimiankova (UWW)	0
Martina Kuenz (AUT)	5^{F}
Elmira Yasin (TUR)	4
Kamilė Gaučaitė (LTU)	0
Jennifer Rösler (GER)	2
Kendra Dacher (FRA)	7
Vanesa Georgieva (BUL)	4
Patrycja Cuber (POL)	4

Quarterfinals
Anastasiya Alpyeyeva (UKR)	10
Valeriia Trifonova (UWW)	0
Martina Kuenz (AUT)	10^{F}
Elmira Yasin (TUR)	0
Alexandra Anghel (ROU)	11^{F}
Kendra Dacher (FRA)	1
Patrycja Cuber (POL)	0
Enrica Rinaldi (ITA)	5

Semifinals
Anastasiya Alpyeyeva (UKR)	6
Martina Kuenz (AUT)	0
Alexandra Anghel (ROU)	3
Enrica Rinaldi (ITA)	1

Final
Anastasiya Alpyeyeva (UKR)	6
Alexandra Anghel (ROU)	2

=== Repechage ===
Bronze medal matches
Valeriia Trifonova (UWW)	0
Martina Kuenz (AUT)	4
Kendra Dacher (FRA)	9
Enrica Rinaldi (ITA)	8

== Final standing ==
Rank	Wrestler
1st place, gold medalist(s)	Anastasiya Alpyeyeva (UKR)
2nd place, silver medalist(s)	Alexandra Anghel (ROU)
3rd place, bronze medalist(s)	Martina Kuenz (AUT)
3rd place, bronze medalist(s)	Kendra Dacher (FRA)
5	Valeriia Trifonova (UWW)
5	Enrica Rinaldi (ITA)
7	Patrycja Cuber (POL)
8	Elmira Yasin (TUR)
9	Vanesa Georgieva (BUL)
10	Jennifer Rösler (GER)
11	Kamilė Gaučaitė (LTU)
12	Anastasiya Zimiankova (UWW)
13	Fani Nađ (SRB)
