= 2019 European Wrestling Championships – Women's freestyle 72 kg =

The women's freestyle 72 kg is a competition featured at the 2019 European Wrestling Championships, and was held in Bucharest, Romania on April 11 and April 12.

== Medalists ==
Gold	Alina Berezhna; Ukraine
Silver	Anna Schell; Germany
Bronze	Tatiana Kolesnikova; Russia

== Results ==
Legend

- F — Won by fall

Elimination groups

Group A

Pos	Athlete	Pld	W	L	CP	TP
1	Alina Berezhna (UKR)	2	1	1	13	6
2	Tatiana Kolesnikova (RUS)	2	1	1	13	5
3	Buse Tosun (TUR)	2	1	1	17	3

Source: UWW

	Score		CP
Tatiana Kolesnikova (RUS)	5–6 Fall	Buse Tosun (TUR)	5–0 FA
Alina Berezhna (UKR)	6–8 Fall	Tatiana Kolesnikova (RUS)	5–0 FA
Buse Tosun (TUR)	11–7	Alina Berezhna (UKR)	3–1 PO1

Group B

Pos	Athlete	Pld	W	L	CP	TP
1	Anna Schell (GER)	2	1	1	8	6
2	Alexandra Anghel (ROU)	2	1	1	7	5
3	Anastasiya Zimiankova (BLR)	2	1	1	5	3

Source: UWW

	Score		CP
Alexandra Anghel (ROU)	3–5 Fall	Anna Schell (GER)	0–5 FA
Anastasiya Zimiankova (BLR)	1–4 Fall	Alexandra Anghel (ROU)	0–5 FA
Anna Schell (GER)	3–4	Anastasiya Zimiankova (BLR)	1–3 PO1

=== Knockout round ===
Semifinals
Alina Berezhna (UKR)	10^{F}
Alexandra Anghel (ROU)	2
Anna Schell (GER)	7^{F}
Tatiana Kolesnikova (RUS)	4

Finals
Alina Berezhna (UKR)	6^{F}
Anna Schell (GER)	0
Bronze medal match
Alexandra Anghel (ROU)	4
Tatiana Kolesnikova (RUS)	5
