= 2022 World Wrestling Championships – Women's freestyle 72 kg =

Wrestling competitions

Women's freestyle 72 kg at the 2022 World Championships
- Venue: Štark Arena
- Dates: 14–15 September 2022
- Competitors: 14 from 14 nations

Medalists
| gold medal | Amit Elor | United States |
| silver medal | Zhamila Bakbergenova | Kazakhstan |
| bronze medal | Alexandra Anghel | Romania |
| bronze medal | Masako Furuichi | Japan |

The women's freestyle 72 kilograms was a competition featured at the 2022 World Wrestling Championships, and was held in Belgrade, Serbia on 14 and 15 September 2022. The qualification rounds were held on 14 September while medal matches were held on the 2nd day of the competition. A total of 14 wrestlers competed in this event, limited to athletes weighing less than 72 kilograms.

This freestyle wrestling competition consisted of a single-elimination tournament, with a repechage used to determine the winner of two bronze medals. The two finalists faced off for gold and silver medals. Each wrestler who lost to one of the two finalists moved into the repechage, culminating in a pair of bronze medal matches featuring the semifinal losers each facing the remaining repechage opponent from their half of the bracket.

Amit Elor of the United States of America won the gold medal after beating Zhamila Bakbergenova from Kazakhstan 10–0 after only one minute and twelve seconds.

Alexandra Anghel from Romania and Masako Furuichi of Japan shared the bronze medals. Anghel beat Oknazarova from Uzbekistan convincingly while Furuichi edged Buse Tosun Çavuşoğlu of Turkey 3–2.

== Results ==
Legend

- F — Won by fall

=== Main bracket ===
Round of 16
Svetlana Oknazarova (UZB) | 7
Patrycja Sperka (POL) | 0
Alexandra Anghel (ROU) | 2
Lilly Schneider (GER) | 0
Shauna Kuebeck (CAN) | 10
Enkh-Amaryn Davaanasan (MGL) | 6
Masako Furuichi (JPN) | 4
Qiandegenchagan (CHN) | 3
Reetika Hooda (IND) | 2
Kendra Dacher (FRA) | 6
Anastasiya Alpyeyeva (UKR) | 0
Amit Elor (USA) | 10

Quarterfinals
Zhamila Bakbergenova (KAZ) | 10
Svetlana Oknazarova (UZB) | 0
Alexandra Anghel (ROU) | 11
Shauna Kuebeck (CAN) | 0
Masako Furuichi (JPN) | 8
Kendra Dacher (FRA) | 4
Amit Elor (USA) | 4^{F}
Buse Tosun Çavuşoğlu (TUR) | 0

Semifinals
Zhamila Bakbergenova (KAZ) | 12
Alexandra Anghel (ROU) | 2
Masako Furuichi (JPN) | 2
Amit Elor (USA) | 3

Final
Zhamila Bakbergenova (KAZ) | 0
Amit Elor (USA) | 10

=== Repechage ===
Repechage round 1
Anastasiya Alpyeyeva (UKR) | 1
Buse Tosun Çavuşoğlu (TUR) | 10

Bronze medals
Svetlana Oknazarova (UZB) | 0
Alexandra Anghel (ROU) | 10
Buse Tosun Çavuşoğlu (TUR) | 2
Masako Furuichi (JPN) | 3

== Final standing ==
| Rank | Athlete |
|---|---|
| 1st place, gold medalist(s) | Amit Elor (USA) |
| 2nd place, silver medalist(s) | Zhamila Bakbergenova (KAZ) |
| 3rd place, bronze medalist(s) | Alexandra Anghel (ROU) |
| 3rd place, bronze medalist(s) | Masako Furuichi (JPN) |
| 5 | Svetlana Oknazarova (UZB) |
| 5 | Buse Tosun Çavuşoğlu (TUR) |
| 7 | Kendra Dacher (FRA) |
| 8 | Shauna Kuebeck (CAN) |
| 9 | Enkh-Amaryn Davaanasan (MGL) |
| 10 | Qiandegenchagan (CHN) |
| 11 | Reetika Hooda (IND) |
| 12 | Anastasiya Alpyeyeva (UKR) |
| 13 | Lilly Schneider (GER) |
| 14 | Patrycja Sperka (POL) |
