= 2019 World Wrestling Championships – Women's freestyle 68 kg =

Wrestling event held in Kazakhstan

Women's freestyle 68 kg at the 2019 World Championships
- Venue: Barys Arena
- Dates: 19–20 September 2019
- Competitors: 32 from 32 nations

Medalists
gold medal	Tamyra Mensah-Stock	United States
silver medal	Jenny Fransson	Sweden
bronze medal	Soronzonboldyn Battsetseg	Mongolia
bronze medal	Anna Schell	Germany

The women's freestyle 68 kilograms was a competition featured at the 2019 World Wrestling Championships, which were held in Nur-Sultan, Kazakhstan, on 19 and 20 September.

This freestyle wrestling competition consists of a single-elimination tournament, with a repechage used to determine the winner of two bronze medals. The two finalists face off for gold and silver medals. Each wrestler who loses to one of the two finalists moves into the repechage, culminating in a pair of bronze medal matches featuring the semifinal losers each facing the remaining repechage opponent from their half of the bracket.

== Results ==
Legend

- F — Won by fall

=== Final ===
Final
Jenny Fransson (SWE)	2
Tamyra Mensah-Stock (USA)	8

=== Top half ===
Round of 32
Alla Cherkasova (UKR)	6^{F}
Jeong Eun-sun (KOR)	2
Yudaris Sánchez (CUB)	4
Samar Amer (EGY)	2
Khanum Velieva (RUS)	1
Zhou Feng (CHN)	2
Danielle Lappage (CAN)	10
Sofiya Georgieva (BUL)	0
Buse Tosun (TUR)	5
Jenny Fransson (SWE)	2^{F}
Koumba Larroque (FRA)	8
Ámbar Garnica (MEX)	0
Anastasija Grigorjeva (LAT)	14
Ilana Kratysh (ISR)	4
Nilufar Gadaeva (UZB)	0
Soronzonboldyn Battsetseg (MGL)	4^{F}

Round of 16
Alla Cherkasova (UKR)	12
Yudaris Sánchez (CUB)	1
Zhou Feng (CHN)	4
Danielle Lappage (CAN)	9
Jenny Fransson (SWE)	3
Koumba Larroque (FRA)	1
Anastasija Grigorjeva (LAT)	0
Soronzonboldyn Battsetseg (MGL)	6

Quarterfinals
Alla Cherkasova (UKR)	8
Danielle Lappage (CAN)	7
Jenny Fransson (SWE)	6
Soronzonboldyn Battsetseg (MGL)	5

Semifinals
Alla Cherkasova (UKR)	7
Jenny Fransson (SWE)	9

=== Bottom half ===
Round of 32
Maryia Mamashuk (BLR)	6
Anna Schell (GER)	8
Irina Netreba (AZE)	6
Yvette Zié (BUR)	4
Agnieszka Wieszczek (POL)	7
Luz Vázquez (ARG)	4
Chen Wen-ling (TPE)	3
Irina Kazyulina (KAZ)	12^{F}
Divya Kakran (IND)	0
Sara Dosho (JPN)	2
Danutė Domikaitytė (LTU)	0
Adéla Hanzlíčková (CZE)	4^{F}
Blessing Oborududu (NGR)	10
Dalma Caneva (ITA)	0
Michelle Montague (NZL)	0
Tamyra Mensah-Stock (USA)	10

Round of 16
Anna Schell (GER)	5^{F}
Irina Netreba (AZE)	2
Agnieszka Wieszczek (POL)	8^{F}
Irina Kazyulina (KAZ)	0
Sara Dosho (JPN)	11
Adéla Hanzlíčková (CZE)	0
Blessing Oborududu (NGR)	1
Tamyra Mensah-Stock (USA)	6

Quarterfinals
Anna Schell (GER)	5
Agnieszka Wieszczek (POL)	3
Sara Dosho (JPN)	1
Tamyra Mensah-Stock (USA)	10

Semifinals
Anna Schell (GER)	0
Tamyra Mensah-Stock (USA)	10

=== Repechage ===
Repechage round 1
Buse Tosun (TUR)	2
Koumba Larroque (FRA)	2
Michelle Montague (NZL)	0
Blessing Oborududu (NGR)	10

Repechage round 2
Koumba Larroque (FRA)	2
Soronzonboldyn Battsetseg (MGL)	12
Blessing Oborududu (NGR)	2
Sara Dosho (JPN)	2

Bronze medals
Soronzonboldyn Battsetseg (MGL)	2
Alla Cherkasova (UKR)	2
Sara Dosho (JPN)	1
Anna Schell (GER)	4
