= 2021 World Wrestling Championships – Women's freestyle 72 kg =

Wrestling competitions

Women's freestyle 72 kg at the 2021 World Championships
- Venue: Nye Jordal Amfi
- Dates: 6–7 October 2021
- Competitors: 14 from 14 nations

Medalists
gold medal	Masako Furuichi	Japan
silver medal	Zhamila Bakbergenova	Kazakhstan
bronze medal	Buse Tosun Çavuşoğlu	Turkey
bronze medal	Anna Schell	Germany

The women's freestyle 72 kilograms is a competition featured at the 2021 World Wrestling Championships, and was held in Oslo, Norway on 6 and 7 October.

This freestyle wrestling competition consists of a single-elimination tournament, with a repechage used to determine the winner of two bronze medals. The two finalists face off for gold and silver medals. Each wrestler who loses to one of the two finalists moves into the repechage, culminating in a pair of bronze medal matches featuring the semifinal losers each facing the remaining repechage opponent from their half of the bracket.

Each bout consists of a single round within a six-minute limit including two halves of three minutes. The wrestler who scores more points is the winner.

Masako Furuichi from Japan won the gold medal after beating Zhamila Bakbergenova of Kazakhstan in the final 3–0. Furuichi scored an early two points takedown and later received one more point for pushing her opponent out of the mat. Buse Tosun Çavuşoğlu from Turkey and Anna Schell of Germany shared the bronze medals.

== Results ==
Legend

- F — Won by fall
- WO — Won by walkover

=== Main bracket ===
Round of 16
~~Kayla Bednarcik (CAN)~~
Cynthia Vescan (FRA)	WO
Anastasiya Zimiankova (BLR)	8
Sofiya Georgieva (BUL)	5
Kylie Welker (USA)	1
Buse Tosun Çavuşoğlu (TUR)	8
Divya Kakran (IND)	5^{F}
Ksenia Burakova (RWF)	4
Enkh-Amaryn Davaanasan (MGL)	0
Masako Furuichi (JPN)	6
Anna Schell (GER)	12
Zsuzsanna Molnár (SVK)	1

Quarterfinals
Zhamila Bakbergenova (KAZ)	10
Cynthia Vescan (FRA)	10
Anastasiya Zimiankova (BLR)	0
Buse Tosun Çavuşoğlu (TUR)	4^{F}
Divya Kakran (IND)	0
Masako Furuichi (JPN)	10
Anna Schell (GER)	2^{F}
Alla Belinska (UKR)	6

Semifinals
Zhamila Bakbergenova (KAZ)	13
Buse Tosun Çavuşoğlu (TUR)	2
Masako Furuichi (JPN)	6
Anna Schell (GER)	2

Final
Zhamila Bakbergenova (KAZ)	0
Masako Furuichi (JPN)	3

=== Repechage ===
Repechage round 1
Enkh-Amaryn Davaanasan (MGL)	6
Divya Kakran (IND)	2

Bronze medals
Cynthia Vescan (FRA)
Buse Tosun Çavuşoğlu (TUR)	WO
Enkh-Amaryn Davaanasan (MGL)	4
Anna Schell (GER)	7^{F}

== Final standing ==
Rank	Athlete
1st place, gold medalist(s)	Masako Furuichi (JPN)
2nd place, silver medalist(s)	Zhamila Bakbergenova (KAZ)
3rd place, bronze medalist(s)	Buse Tosun Çavuşoğlu (TUR)
3rd place, bronze medalist(s)	Anna Schell (GER)
5	Cynthia Vescan (FRA)
5	Enkh-Amaryn Davaanasan (MGL)
7	Divya Kakran (IND)
8	Anastasiya Zimiankova (BLR)
9	Sofiya Georgieva (BUL)
10	Kylie Welker (USA)
11	Zsuzsanna Molnár (SVK)
12	Alla Belinska (UKR)
13	Ksenia Burakova (RWF)
—	Kayla Bednarcik (CAN)
