= Amit Elor =

American freestyle wrestler (born 2004)

Personal information
- Born: January 1, 2004 (age 22) Walnut Creek, California, U.S.
- Education: Diablo Valley College
- Years active: 2019–present
- Height: 5 ft 7 in (170 cm)
- Weight: 72 kg (159 lb)

Sport
- Country: United States
- Sport: Amateur wrestling
- Weight class: 72 kg (159 pounds)
- Event: Freestyle
- Club: New York City Regional Training Center; New York Athletic Club; Al Wahda Club Jiu-Jitsu Academy; Titan Mercury Wrestling Club
- Coached by: Terry Steiner (women's coach for USA Wrestling); Sara McMann

Achievements and titles
- World finals: 2x world champion (2022, 2023)
- Highest world ranking: No. 1
Medal record
Women's freestyle wrestling
Representing the United States
Olympic Games
Gold medal – first place	2024 Paris	68 kg
World Championships
Gold medal – first place	2022 Belgrade	72 kg
Gold medal – first place	2023 Belgrade	72 kg
Pan American Championships
Gold medal – first place	2023 Buenos Aires	72 kg
U23 World Championships
Gold medal – first place	2022 Pontevedra	72 kg
Gold medal – first place	2023 Tirana	72 kg
Junior World Championships
Gold medal – first place	2021 Ufa	68 kg
Gold medal – first place	2022 Sofia	72 kg
Gold medal – first place	2023 Amman	72 kg
Cadet World Championships
Gold medal – first place	2021 Budapest	69 kg
Bronze medal – third place	2019 Sofia	69 kg

Amit Elor (/əˈmiːt iːˈlɔːr/ ə-MEET ee-LOR; born January 1, 2004) is an American freestyle wrestler who has won Olympic (2024) and world gold medals. She competes at 72 kilograms (159 pounds). She has won eight world championships, and has been a cadet, junior, U23 and senior world champion. Elor won the senior world championships in both 2022 and 2023. Going into the 2024 Olympics, she had not lost an international match, in any age group since 2019. At the time she had compiled a 37-0 record and outscored her opponents by a margin of 322-16.

Elor won the gold medal at the Paris Olympics in women's freestyle wrestling 68 kg at the Grand Palais Éphémère. At 20, she became the youngest United States wrestler ever, male or female, to win an Olympic gold medal. By winning the gold medal at the Olympics, she joined Yui Susaki as the only wrestlers to complete a Golden Grand Slam (previously winning the cadet, junior, U23 and senior world titles).

== Early life ==
Elor was born in Walnut Creek, California, to Elana and Yair Elor, both from Ashkelon, Israel, who had moved to the United States in 1980 to attend university. Her father, a shot putter and discus thrower, received an athletic scholarship from Boise State University in Boise, Idaho.

She is the youngest in her family and has six siblings. Her sister Ronny and brother Orry both won USA Wrestling Junior National titles (Orry was fourth in the 2016 US Greco-Roman Olympic trials in Iowa City, Iowa). Her brother Aviv took silver in the 2016 NCJA Judo Collegiate Nationals. Her brother Oshry was murdered at home at age 23 during an attempted robbery in Pleasant Hill, California in 2018. Her father Yair died in 2022 during the COVID-19 pandemic. Both of her grandfathers and her great-grandmother were Holocaust survivors and the rest of her family lives in Israel.

Elor grew up in Walnut Creek. She only spoke Hebrew until she attended a JCC preschool in Contra Costa County. She attended College Park High School in Pleasant Hill, graduating in 2022. She attends Diablo Valley College in the city, studying statistics, applied math, and psychology.

== Wrestling career ==
Elor has trained in wrestling almost her whole life, having started at age four. While growing up, she traveled to Israel every summer to wrestle. She was a skilled judoka at a young age, representing the U.S. in the female INTL Intermediate division at +43kg in 2013, at nine years old.

=== Collegiate style ===
During the years she was in high school, Elor won multiple high school tournaments. In her freshman year, she was 36-0 and pinned her final opponent in 20 seconds winning a California Interscholastic Federation state championship. She received the 2019 California High School Champion of Champions award. She was the 2016 Novice USA Wrestling Girls Folkstyle Nationals champion.

=== Freestyle ===
==== Early years ====
After meeting Ukrainian/Israeli coach Valentin Kalika, Elor started training in freestyle wrestling. Her mother recalls that as a child, "once she started beating up the boys, there were a lot of coaches that didn’t like it. They would tell her, 'Go easy on the boys'."

In 2019, she won the gold medal in the Cadet (U17) Beach World Championships in Odessa, Ukraine and the bronze medal in the Cadet (U17) World Championships in Sofia, Bulgaria. In 2021, Elor won gold medals in the Junior (U20) World Wrestling Championships in Ufa, Russia and the Cadet (U17) World Championships in Budapest, Hungary. She also won the gold medal in the Junior Dumitru Pirvulescu & Vasile Iorga tournament in Bucharest, Romania. Because she was born on January 1, 2004, she missed the age cutoff to qualify to compete in the 2020 Tokyo Games by one day.

==== 2022–present ====
In September 2022, Elor became the youngest Senior World Champion in American wrestling history, after winning the world title in the 2022 World Wrestling Championships in Belgrade, Serbia at 18 years old. She defeated Zhamila Bakbergenova of Kazakhstan in a gold medal match. A month later, she won a gold medal in the 72 kg event at the 2022 U23 World Wrestling Championships held in Ponteveda, Spain. She also won the gold medal in the U20 World Championships in Sofia.

In 2023, she won the gold medals in the Senior World Wrestling Championships (for the second year in a row) in Belgrade, the U23 World Wrestling Championships in Tirana, Albania, and the U20 World Junior Wrestling Championships in Amman, Jordan. Elor also won the gold medal in her event at the 2023 Pan American Wrestling Championships held in Buenos Aires, Argentina. Also in 2023, she was named the Women's Wrestler of the Year by USA Wrestling for the second consecutive year. In 2024, at the Pan American Wrestling Olympic Qualification Tournament held in Acapulco, Mexico, Elor earned a quota place for the United States for the 2024 Summer Olympics held in Paris. She qualified for the Olympics at the 2024 U.S. Olympic trials held in State College, Pennsylvania.

Going into the 2024 Olympics, she had not lost an international match, in any age group, since 2019. She had won eight world titles in three years and had compiled a 37-0 record, outscoring her opponents by a margin of 322-16.

=== 2024 Paris Olympics ===
Elor won the gold medal for the United States at the 2024 Summer Olympics in Paris in Women's freestyle wrestling 68 kg at the Grand Palais Éphémère in Champ de Mars. At 20 years of age, she was the youngest female wrestler ever to represent the United States at the Olympics. She had dropped down from the weight class at which she typically competed, 72 kg, because it was not offered on the Olympic program. She said: "I am very concerned about hostility Israeli athletes may receive this summer. Particularly after what happened in the 1972 Munich Olympics, the horrifying attack on October 7, the ongoing war in Israel, and the antisemitism rising all over the world. Israel means a lot to me. It’s my parents’ home and therefore it’s my home, too. She said:

I was shocked by the October 7 brutal Hamas attack and deeply saddened and concerned about everything that followed. The enormous pain, suffering, and loss is unbearable. If my wrestling at the Olympics can bring even just a little joy in Israel, it will make all the hard work and sacrifices worth it and extra special. I am an American proudly wrestling for the U.S., but in my heart, I am also wrestling for Israel.

She defeated 2023 reigning world champion Buse Tosun Çavuşoğlu of Turkey in the first round (10-2), three-time European U23 champion Wiktoria Chołuj of Poland in the second round (8-0), Pak Sol-gum of North Korea in the semi-finals (10-0), and 2021 world champion Meerim Zhumanazarova of Kyrgyzstan in the finals (3-0). She became the youngest U.S. wrestler ever, male or female, to win an Olympic gold medal. She extended her five-year undefeated streak.

After Elor won her Olympic gold medal, she received antisemitic comments on social media, including a comment "you belong in the gas chamber." She posted a video in which she wore a yellow ribbon pin in response, symbolizing support for the hostages held by Hamas in Gaza. She said: "Eighty years ago my grandparents survived the Holocaust, but antisemitism is still all around us. My grandparents won. I won. Humanity will win. Never again."

==== 2025 ====
Elor competed in the World Team Trials in Louisville, Kentucky on May 16–17.

== Championships and achievements ==
- Freestyle wrestling:
  - 2019 Cadet World Championships – 3rd (69 kg)
  - 2021 Cadet World Championships – 1st (69 kg)
  - 2021 Junior World Championships – 1st (68 kg)
  - 2022, 2023 Junior World Championships – 1st (72 kg)
  - 2022 Zouhaier Sghaier Ranking Series – 8th (72 kg)
  - 2022, 2023 Senior World Championships – 1st (72 kg)
  - 2022, 2023 U23 World Championships – 1st (72 kg)
  - 2022 World Cup – 4th (72 kg)
  - 2023 Pan American Championships – 1st (72 kg)
  - 2024 Summer Olympics – 1st (68 kg)
- Brazilian Jiu-Jitsu (she has also been a Brazilian jiu-jitsu practitioner):
  - Purple belt
  - 2021 BJJBET Grand Prix – 1st (68 kg)

== International freestyle wrestling record ==
Senior Freestyle International matches
Res.	Record	Opponent	Score	Date	Event	Location
2024 Summer Olympics (gold) at 68 kg
Win	41–1	(Kyrgyzstan) Meerim Zhumanazarova	3-0	August 5–6, 2024	Summer Olympics	Paris, France
Win	40–1	(North Korea) Pak Sol-gum	TF 10–0	August 5–6, 2024	Summer Olympics	Paris, France
Win	39–1	(Poland) Wiktoria Chołuj	8–0	August 5–6, 2024	Summer Olympics	Paris, France
Win	38–1	(Turkey) Buse Tosun	10–2	August 5–6, 2024	Summer Olympics	Paris, France
2023 U23 World Championships (gold) at 72 kg
Win	37–1	(India) Jyoti Berwal	TF 10–0	October 26–27, 2023	U23 World Championships	Tirana, Albania
Win	36–1	(Poland) Wiktoria Chołuj	5–0	October 26–27, 2023	U23 World Championships	Tirana, Albania
Win	35–1	(Belarus) Viktoryia Radzkova	4^{F}–0	October 26–27, 2023	U23 World Championships	Tirana, Albania
Win	34–1	(Tunisia) Zaineb Sghaier	4^{F}–0	October 26–27, 2023	U23 World Championships	Tirana, Albania
2023 World Championships (gold) at 72 kg
Win	33–1	(Mongolia) Enkh-Amaryn Davaanasan	8–2	September 20–21, 2023	World Championships	Belgrad, Serbia
Win	32–1	(France) Kendra Dacher	TF 12–2	September 20–21, 2023	World Championships	Belgrad, Serbia
Win	31–1	(Japan) Miwa Morikawa	6–0	September 20–21, 2023	World Championships	Belgrad, Serbia
Win	30–1	(Turkey) Nesrin Baş	7–0	September 20–21, 2023	World Championships	Belgrad, Serbia
2023 Junior World Championships (gold) at 72 kg
Win	29–1	(Turkey) Bükrenaz Sert	TF 11–0	August 19–20, 2023	Junior World Championships	Amman, Jordan
Win	28–1	(Japan) Yuka Fujikura	TF 10–0	August 19–20, 2023	Junior World Championships	Amman, Jordan
Win	27–1	(Poland) Patrycja Cuber	5^{F}–0	August 19–20, 2023	Junior World Championships	Amman, Jordan
Win	26–1	(Kazakhstan) Shamshiyabanu Tastanbek	TF 10–0	August 19–20, 2023	Junior World Championships	Amman, Jordan
2023 Pan American Wrestling Championships (gold) at 72 kg
Win	25–1	(Chile) Isidora Martinez	TF 10–0	May 7, 2023	Pan American Championship	Buenos Aires, Argentina
Win	24–1	(Brazil) Meiriele Hora	TF 10–0	May 7, 2023	Pan American Championship	Buenos Aires, Argentina
Win	23–1	(Canada) Katie Mulkay	6^{F}–0	May 7, 2023	Pan American Championship	Buenos Aires, Argentina
Win	22–1	(Colombia) Luisa Mosquera	TF 10–0	May 7, 2023	Pan American Championship	Buenos Aires, Argentina
2022 World Cup 4th at 72 kg
Win	21–1	(China) Qiandegenchagan Qiandegenchagan	5–0	December 10–11, 2022	World Cup	(United States) Coralville, US
U23 2022 World Championships (gold) at 72 kg
Win	20–1	(Poland) Wiktoria Chołuj	TF 11–0	October 20–21, 2022	U23 World Championships	Pontevedra, Spain
Win	19–1	(Romania) Larisa Nițu	4^{F}–0	October 20–21, 2022	U23 World Championships	Pontevedra, Spain
Win	18–1	(France) Kendra Dacher	13^{F}–2	October 20–21, 2022	U23 World Championships	Pontevedra, Spain
2022 Senior World Championships (gold) at 72 kg
Win	17–1	(Kazakhstan) Zhamila Bakbergenova	10–0	September 14–15, 2022	Senior World Championships	Belgrade, Serbia
Win	16–1	(Japan) Masako Furuichi	3–2	September 14–15, 2022	Senior World Championships	Belgrade, Serbia
Win	15–1	(Turkey) Buse Tosun	4^{F}–0	September 14–15, 2022	Senior World Championships	Belgrade, Serbia
Win	14–1	(Ukraine) Anastasiya Alpyeyeva	TF 10–0	September 14–15, 2022	Senior World Championships	Belgrade, Serbia
2022 Junior World Championships (gold) at 72 kg
Win	13–1	(Kazakhstan) Anastassiya Panassovich	TF 10–0	August 15–21, 2022	Junior World Championships	Sofia, Bulgaria
Win	12–1	(India) Reetika Reetika	TF 12–1	August 15–21, 2022	Junior World Championships	Sofia, Bulgaria
Win	11–1	(Hungary) Zsófia Virág	TF 10–0	August 15–21, 2022	Junior World Championships	Sofia, Bulgaria
Win	10–1	(Tunisia) Zaineb Sghaier	Fall	August 15–21, 2022	Junior World Championships	Sofia, Bulgaria
Zouhaier Sghaier 8th at 72 kg
	9–1	(Tunisia) Zaineb Sghaier	Forfeit	July 14–17, 2022	Zouhaier Sghaier	Tunis, Tunisia
	9–1	(India) Bipasha Bipasha	Forfeit	July 14–17, 2022	Zouhaier Sghaier	Tunis, Tunisia
2021 Junior World Championships (gold) at 68 kg
Win	9–1	(Russia) Elizaveta Petliakova	TF 10–0	August 16–22, 2021	2021 Junior World Championships	Ufa, Russia
Win	8–1	(Slovakia) Molnar Zsuzsanna	TF 11–0	August 16–22, 2021	2021 Junior World Championships	Ufa, Russia
Win	7–1	(India) Arju Arju	TF 10–0	August 16–22, 2021	2021 Junior World Championships	Ufa, Russia
2021 Cadet World Championships (gold) at 69 kg
Win	6–1	(Ukraine) Yevhenii Siedykh	Fall	July 19–25, 2021	2021 Cadet World Championships	Budapest, Hungary
Win	5–1	(Belarus) Viktoryia Radzkova	Fall	July 19–25, 2021	2021 Cadet World Championships	Budapest, Hungary
Win	4–1	(Romania) Barbara Abigel Sere	TF 10–0	July 19–25, 2021	2021 Cadet World Championships	Budapest, Hungary
2019 Cadet World Championships (bronze) at 69 kg
Win	3–1	(Tunisia) Zaineb Sghaier	TF 12–0	July 29–4, 2019	2019 Cadet World Championships	Sofia, Bulgaria
Loss	2–1	(Japan) Honoka Naka	1–3	July 29–4, 2019	2019 Cadet World Championships	Sofia, Bulgaria
Win	2–0	(Hungary) Lili Újfalvi	TF 10–0	July 29–4, 2019	2019 Cadet World Championships	Sofia, Bulgaria
Win	1–0	(Ukraine) Karolina Povk	TF 12–0	July 29–4, 2019	2019 Cadet World Championships	Sofia, Bulgaria

== Personal life ==
Elor is a dog lover, likes to cook, and is engaged to Micael Galvão.

== See also ==
- List of select Jewish wrestlers
- List of World and Olympic Champions in women's freestyle wrestling
- List of World Championships medalists in wrestling (women)
