= Paliha =

Chinese freestyle wrestler

Paliha Paliha
Personal information
- Native name: 帕丽哈
- Citizenship: China
- Born: 6 June 1996 (age 30) Wusu, Tacheng Prefecture, Xinjiang, China
- Height: 175 cm (5 ft 9 in)

Sport
- Country: China
- Sport: Amateur wrestling
- Event: Freestyle
Medal record
Women's freestyle wrestling
Representing China
World Wrestling Championships
Bronze medal – third place	2019 Nur-Sultan	72 kg
Asian Wrestling Championships
Gold medal – first place	2017 New Delhi	75 kg
Gold medal – first place	2019 Xi'an	75 kg
Asian Indoor and Martial Arts Games
Gold medal – first place	2017 Ashgabat	75 kg
Golden Grand Prix Ivan Yarygin
Bronze medal – third place	2018 Krasnoyarsk	76 kg
World U23 Wrestling Championships
Gold medal – first place	2018 Bucharest	76 kg
Gold medal – first place	2019 Budapest	76 kg

Paliha Paliha (born 6 June 1996 in Xinjiang) is a Chinese freestyle wrestler. She won one of the bronze medals in the women's 72 kg event at the 2019 World Wrestling Championships held in Nur-Sultan, Kazakhstan.

== Career ==
Paliha is from Wusu, Xinjiang province and is of Uyghur ethnicity. She started wrestling when she was 14 upon encouragement of her grandfather.

She won the gold medal in the women's 75 kg event at the Asian Wrestling Championships both in 2017 and in 2019. In 2017, she also won the gold medal in the 75 kg event at the Asian Indoor and Martial Arts Games held in Ashgabat, Turkmenistan. She also competed in the women's freestyle 75 kg event at the 2017 World Wrestling Championships where she was eliminated in the semifinals by Vasilisa Marzaliuk.

She also won the gold medal in the women's 76 kg event at the 2018 World U23 Wrestling Championship held in Bucharest, Romania and at the 2019 World U23 Wrestling Championship held in Budapest, Hungary.

== Achievements ==
Year	Competition	Venue	Position	Event	Notes
Representing China
2017	Asian Championships	New Delhi, India	1st	Freestyle 75 kg	
2017	Asian Indoor and Martial Arts Games	Ashgabat, Turkmenistan	1st	Freestyle 75 kg	
2019	Asian Championships	Xi'an, China	1st	Freestyle 75 kg	
2019	World Championships	Nur-Sultan, Kazakhstan	3rd	Freestyle 72 kg	
