= Wrestling at the 2022 Mediterranean Games – Women's freestyle 76 kg =

Wrestling competitions

Women's Freestyle 76 kg at the 2022 Mediterranean Games
- Venue: EMEC Hall
- Date: 28–29 June
- Competitors: 8 from 8 nations

Medalists
gold medal	Yasemin Adar	Turkey
silver medal	Enrica Rinaldi	Italy
bronze medal	Kendra Dacher	France
bronze medal	Samar Amer	Egypt

The women's freestyle 76 kg competition of the wrestling events at the 2022 Mediterranean Games in Oran, Algeria, was held from 28 June to 29 June at the EMEC Hall.

== Results ==
Legend

- F — Won by fall

Quarterfinals		Semifinals		Final
Kendra Dacher (FRA)	8
Zaineb Sghaier (TUN)	7	Kendra Dacher (FRA)	0
Stefania Zacheila (GRE)	0	Enrica Rinaldi (ITA)	6
Enrica Rinaldi (ITA)	4^{F}			Enrica Rinaldi (ITA)	0
Samar Amer (EGY)	0			Yasemin Adar (TUR)	10
Yasemin Adar (TUR)	10	Yasemin Adar (TUR)	10
Carla Lera (ESP)	11	Carla Lera (ESP)	0
Hadil Boughezal (ALG)	1

Bronze medals
Stefania Zacheila (GRE)	0
Kendra Dacher (FRA)	4^{F}
Samar Amer (EGY)	2^{F}
Carla Lera (ESP)	0
