= Wrestling at the 2024 Summer Olympics – Women's freestyle 68 kg =

Women's freestyle 68 kg at the Games of the XXXIII Olympiad
- Venue: Grand Palais Éphémère
- Date: 5–6 August 2024
- Competitors: 16 from 16 nations

Medalists
1st place, gold medalist(s)		Amit Elor	United States
2nd place, silver medalist(s)		Meerim Zhumanazarova	Kyrgyzstan
3rd place, bronze medalist(s)		Buse Tosun Çavuşoğlu	Turkey
3rd place, bronze medalist(s)		Nonoka Ozaki	Japan

Women's freestyle 68 kilograms competition at the 2024 Summer Olympics in Paris, France, took place on 5–6 August 2024 at the Grand Palais Éphémère in Champ de Mars.

== Background ==
This is the third appearance of women's light heavyweight category, debut in 2016 and it has appeared in every games since then.

- 2016: 69kg
- 2020-current: 68kg

Amit Elor won the event by defeating Meerim Zhumanazarova in the final, Nonoka Ozaki of Japan and Buse Tosun Çavuşoğlu of Türkiye won bronze medals respectively with both Ozaki and Çavuşoğlu going through repechages.

== Format ==
This freestyle wrestling competition consists of a single-elimination tournament, with a repechage used to determine the winner of two bronze medals. The two finalists face off for gold and silver medals. Each wrestler who loses to one of the two finalists moves into the repechage, culminating in a pair of bronze medal matches featuring the semifinal losers each facing the remaining repechage opponent from their half of the bracket.

== Rules ==
A typical bout consists of two halves of three minutes each separated by a 30-second break. The two competitors compete on a mat, which is nine meters in diameter. Wrestlers try to score points by executing various legal maneuvers. Points ranging from one to five are awarded by the mat referee depending on the degree of difficulty of the maneuvers. Points are also awarded to the opponent in case of infractions such as illegal holds, passivity etc. A wrestler is automatically disqualified if three cautions are awarded during a bout. Forcing an opponent's shoulders to the mat results in an instant victory by fall.

During the course of a match, if a wrestler builds a 10-point advantage over the opponent, the bout is stopped and the leader is declared as the winner by technical superiority. The total scores are totaled at the end of the stipulated six-minute period, and the wrestler with the maximum points wins. In case of a tie, the wrestler who has scored the last point is declared the winner. A competitor might also be declared a winner if the opponent does not turn up or is medically unfit to compete.

== Qualification ==
Sixteen quota places were available with each nation restricted to a maximum of one spot. Five quota places were awarded at the 2023 World Wrestling Championships, which took place from 16 to 24 September in Belgrade, Serbia. The finalists of each category in the four continental qualification tournaments (Asia, Europe, the Americas, and the joint Africa & Oceania) were awarded quota places. The remainder of the total quota was allocated at the 2024 World Wrestling Olympic Qualification Tournament, offering a minimum of three quota places.

== Schedule ==
All times are Central European Time (UTC+02:00)

Date	Time	Event
5 August 2024	15:00	Qualification rounds
5 August 2024	21:00	Semifinals
6 August 2024	11:00	Repechage
6 August 2024	20:50	Finals

== Results ==
Sixteen athletes qualified for the competition.

Legend

- F — Won by fall

=== Main bracket ===
Round of 16
Buse Tosun Çavuşoğlu (TUR)	2
Amit Elor (USA)	10
Wiktoria Chołuj (POL)	10
Zhou Feng (CHN)	3
Tetiana Rizhko (UKR)	4
Nisha Dahiya (IND)	6
Pak Sol-gum (PRK)	10
Irina Rîngaci (MDA)	6
Koumba Larroque (FRA)	6
Tayla Ford (NZL)	0
Linda Morais (CAN)	2
Blessing Oborududu (NGR)	8
Soleymi Caraballo (VEN)	0
Nonoka Ozaki (JPN)	10
Meerim Zhumanazarova (KGZ)	8
Enkhsaikhany Delgermaa (MGL)	3

Quarterfinals
Amit Elor (USA)	8
Wiktoria Chołuj (POL)	0
Nisha Dahiya (IND)	8
Pak Sol-gum (PRK)	10
Koumba Larroque (FRA)	2
Blessing Oborududu (NGR)	6
Nonoka Ozaki (JPN)	6
Meerim Zhumanazarova (KGZ)	8

Semifinals
Amit Elor (USA)	10
Pak Sol-gum (PRK)	0
Blessing Oborududu (NGR)	1
Meerim Zhumanazarova (KGZ)	3

Final
Amit Elor (USA)	3
Meerim Zhumanazarova (KGZ)	0

=== Repechage ===
Repechage
Buse Tosun Çavuşoğlu (TUR)	4
Wiktoria Chołuj (POL)	3
Enkhsaikhany Delgermaa (MGL)	0
Nonoka Ozaki (JPN)	6

Bronze medal matches
Buse Tosun Çavuşoğlu (TUR)	4
Pak Sol-gum (PRK)	2
Nonoka Ozaki (JPN)	3
Blessing Oborududu (NGR)	0

== Final standing ==
Rank	Athlete
1st place, gold medalist(s)	Amit Elor (USA)
2nd place, silver medalist(s)	Meerim Zhumanazarova (KGZ)
3rd place, bronze medalist(s)	Buse Tosun Çavuşoğlu (TUR)
3rd place, bronze medalist(s)	Nonoka Ozaki (JPN)
5	Pak Sol-gum (PRK)
5	Blessing Oborududu (NGR)
7	Nisha Dahiya (IND)
8	Wiktoria Chołuj (POL)
9	Koumba Larroque (FRA)
10	Irina Rîngaci (MDA)
11	Tetiana Rizhko (UKR)
12	Zhou Feng (CHN)
13	Enkhsaikhany Delgermaa (MGL)
14	Linda Morais (CAN)
15	Tayla Ford (NZL)
16	Soleymi Caraballo (VEN)
