= 2019 U23 World Wrestling Championships =

- Host city: Budapest, Hungary
- Dates: October 28 – November 3

Champions
- Freestyle: Russia
- Greco-Roman: Iran
- Women: Japan

The 2019 U23 World Wrestling Championships were the third edition of U23 World Wrestling Championships of combined events, held from October 28 to November 3 in Budapest, Hungary.

== Medal table ==
Rank	Nation	Gold	Silver	Bronze	Total
1	Japan	8	4	4	16
2	Iran	6	1	5	12
3	Russia	3	5	7	15
4	Georgia	2	4	2	8
5	China	2	2	1	5
6	Cuba	2	0	2	4
7	Azerbaijan	1	3	3	7
8	United States	1	2	0	3
9	Ukraine	1	1	7	9
10	Kyrgyzstan	1	1	1	3
11	Armenia	1	0	1	2
12	Egypt	1	0	0	1
12	Finland	1	0	0	1
14	India	0	2	0	2
15	Kazakhstan	0	1	5	6
16	Belarus	0	1	4	5
17	Moldova	0	1	3	4
17	Mongolia	0	1	3	4
19	Croatia	0	1	0	1
20	Turkey	0	0	6	6
21	Canada	0	0	3	3
22	Chinese Taipei	0	0	1	1
22	Poland	0	0	1	1
22	Romania	0	0	1	1
Totals (24 entries)		30	30	60	120

== Team ranking ==
Rank	Men's freestyle		Men's Greco-Roman		Women's freestyle	
Rank	Team	Points	Team	Points	Team	Points
1	Russia	145	Iran	122	Japan	230
2	Iran	139	Georgia	121	China	105
3	Azerbaijan	111	Russia	118	Ukraine	103
4	Georgia	109	Ukraine	77	Russia	87
5	Mongolia	70	Belarus	69	United States	80
6	Japan	65	Japan	65	Mongolia	71
7	Kazakhstan	65	Turkey	65	Kazakhstan	68
8	Turkey	60	Armenia	64	Canada	65
9	Ukraine	58	Kazakhstan	54	Belarus	58
10	United States	57	Hungary	42	Romania	49

== Medal summary ==
=== Men's freestyle ===
Event	Gold	Silver	Bronze
57 kg	Reineri Andreu; Cuba	Adlan Askarov; Kazakhstan	Alireza Sarlak; Iran
57 kg	Reineri Andreu; Cuba	Adlan Askarov; Kazakhstan	Afgan Khashalov; Azerbaijan
61 kg	Ulukbek Zholdoshbekov; Kyrgyzstan	Ravinder Dahiya; India	Ryutaro Hayama; Japan
61 kg	Ulukbek Zholdoshbekov; Kyrgyzstan	Ravinder Dahiya; India	Dinislam Takhtarov; Russia
65 kg	Turan Bayramov; Azerbaijan	Takuma Taniyama; Japan	Ihor Nykyforuk; Ukraine
65 kg	Turan Bayramov; Azerbaijan	Takuma Taniyama; Japan	Maxim Saculțan; Moldova
70 kg	Mirza Skhulukhia; Georgia	Chermen Valiev; Russia	Daud Ibragimov; Azerbaijan
70 kg	Mirza Skhulukhia; Georgia	Chermen Valiev; Russia	Haruki Seno; Japan
74 kg	Razambek Zhamalov; Russia	Mohammad Nokhodi; Iran	Giorgi Sulava; Georgia
74 kg	Razambek Zhamalov; Russia	Mohammad Nokhodi; Iran	Bat-Erdeniin Byambadorj; Mongolia
79 kg	Tariel Gaphrindashvili; Georgia	Abubakr Abakarov; Azerbaijan	Radik Valiev; Russia
79 kg	Tariel Gaphrindashvili; Georgia	Abubakr Abakarov; Azerbaijan	Ramazan Sarı; Turkey
86 kg	Kamran Ghasempour; Iran	Gadzhimurad Magomedsaidov; Azerbaijan	Osman Göçen; Turkey
86 kg	Kamran Ghasempour; Iran	Gadzhimurad Magomedsaidov; Azerbaijan	Hayato Ishiguro; Japan
92 kg	Bo Nickal; United States	Batyrbek Tsakulov; Russia	Hossein Shahbazi; Iran
92 kg	Bo Nickal; United States	Batyrbek Tsakulov; Russia	Yonger Bastida; Cuba
97 kg	Mojtaba Goleij; Iran	Shamil Musaev; Russia	Danylo Stasiuk; Ukraine
97 kg	Mojtaba Goleij; Iran	Shamil Musaev; Russia	Dzianis Khramiankou; Belarus
125 kg	Amir Hossein Zare; Iran	Vitalii Goloev; Russia	Mönkhtöriin Lkhagvagerel; Mongolia
125 kg	Amir Hossein Zare; Iran	Vitalii Goloev; Russia	Yusup Batirmurzaev; Kazakhstan

=== Men's Greco-Roman ===
Event	Gold	Silver	Bronze
55 kg	Shota Ogawa; Japan	Emin Sefershaev; Russia	Zaur Aliyev; Azerbaijan
55 kg	Shota Ogawa; Japan	Emin Sefershaev; Russia	Ekrem Öztürk; Turkey
60 kg	Armen Melikyan; Armenia	Zholaman Sharshenbekov; Kyrgyzstan	Mehdi Mohsennejad; Iran
60 kg	Armen Melikyan; Armenia	Zholaman Sharshenbekov; Kyrgyzstan	Artur Petrosian; Russia
63 kg	Meisam Dalkhani; Iran	Levani Kavjaradze; Georgia	Fadis Valitov; Russia
63 kg	Meisam Dalkhani; Iran	Levani Kavjaradze; Georgia	Maksim Nehoda; Belarus
67 kg	Mohamed Ibrahim El-Sayed; Egypt	Aliaksandr Liavonchyk; Belarus	Sajjad Imentalab; Iran
67 kg	Mohamed Ibrahim El-Sayed; Egypt	Aliaksandr Liavonchyk; Belarus	Artur Politaiev; Ukraine
72 kg	Mohammad Reza Geraei; Iran	Sanan Suleymanov; Azerbaijan	Valentin Petic; Moldova
72 kg	Mohammad Reza Geraei; Iran	Sanan Suleymanov; Azerbaijan	Maksym Yevtushenko; Ukraine
77 kg	Islam Opiev; Russia	Kodai Sakuraba; Japan	Serkan Akkoyun; Turkey
77 kg	Islam Opiev; Russia	Kodai Sakuraba; Japan	Tamerlan Shadukayev; Kazakhstan
82 kg	Milad Alirzaev; Russia	Vjekoslav Luburić; Croatia	Aivengo Rikadze; Georgia
82 kg	Milad Alirzaev; Russia	Vjekoslav Luburić; Croatia	Yevgeniy Polivadov; Kazakhstan
87 kg	Semen Novikov; Ukraine	Gurami Khetsuriani; Georgia	Daniel Grégorich; Cuba
87 kg	Semen Novikov; Ukraine	Gurami Khetsuriani; Georgia	Kiryl Maskevich; Belarus
97 kg	Arvi Savolainen; Finland	Giorgi Melia; Georgia	Mohammad Hadi Saravi; Iran
97 kg	Arvi Savolainen; Finland	Giorgi Melia; Georgia	Dzmitry Kaminski; Belarus
130 kg	Ali Akbar Yousefi; Iran	Zviadi Pataridze; Georgia	Osman Yıldırım; Turkey
130 kg	Ali Akbar Yousefi; Iran	Zviadi Pataridze; Georgia	David Ovasapyan; Armenia

=== Women's freestyle ===
Event	Gold	Silver	Bronze
50 kg	Kika Kagata; Japan	Feng Ziqi; China	Jade Dufour; Canada
50 kg	Kika Kagata; Japan	Feng Ziqi; China	Nadezhda Sokolova; Russia
53 kg	Haruna Okuno; Japan	Pooja Gehlot; India	Anudari Nandintsetseg; Mongolia
53 kg	Haruna Okuno; Japan	Pooja Gehlot; India	Zeynep Yetgil; Turkey
55 kg	Luo Lannuan; China	Saki Igarashi; Japan	Andreea Ana; Romania
55 kg	Luo Lannuan; China	Saki Igarashi; Japan	Marina Sedneva; Kazakhstan
57 kg	Sae Nanjo; Japan	Alina Akobiia; Ukraine	Hannah Taylor; Canada
57 kg	Sae Nanjo; Japan	Alina Akobiia; Ukraine	Marina Simonyan; Russia
59 kg	Yumeka Tanabe; Japan	Anastasia Nichita; Moldova	Anhelina Lysak; Ukraine
59 kg	Yumeka Tanabe; Japan	Anastasia Nichita; Moldova	Tianna Kennett; Canada
62 kg	Yuzuka Inagaki; Japan	Kayla Miracle; United States	Ilona Prokopevniuk; Ukraine
62 kg	Yuzuka Inagaki; Japan	Kayla Miracle; United States	Irina Rîngaci; Moldova
65 kg	Misuzu Enomoto; Japan	Purevsuren Ulziisaikhan; Mongolia	Iryna Koliadenko; Ukraine
65 kg	Misuzu Enomoto; Japan	Purevsuren Ulziisaikhan; Mongolia	Madina Bakbergenova; Kazakhstan
68 kg	Masako Furuichi; Japan	Macey Kilty; United States	Wang Yingying; China
68 kg	Masako Furuichi; Japan	Macey Kilty; United States	Natalia Strzałka; Poland
72 kg	Milaimys Marín; Cuba	Wang Xiaoqian; China	Evgeniia Zakharchenko; Russia
72 kg	Milaimys Marín; Cuba	Wang Xiaoqian; China	Mei Shindo; Japan
76 kg	Paliha; China	Yuka Kagami; Japan	Chang Hui-tsz; Chinese Taipei
76 kg	Paliha; China	Yuka Kagami; Japan	Aiperi Medet Kyzy; Kyrgyzstan
