= 2022 European Wrestling Championships – Women's freestyle 72 kg =

Wrestling competition

Women's freestyle 72 kg at the 2022 European Wrestling Championships
- Venue: BOK Sports Hall
- Location: Budapest, Hungary
- Dates: 31 March - 1 April
- Competitors: 9

Medalists
gold medal	Anna Schell	Germany
silver medal	Buse Tosun	Turkey
bronze medal	Kendra Dacher	France
bronze medal	Yuliana Yaneva	Bulgaria

The women's freestyle 72 kg was a competition featured at the 2022 European Wrestling Championships, and was held in Budapest, Hungary on March 31 and 1 April.

== Results ==
Legend

- F — Won by fall
- WO — Won by walkover

=== Main Bracket ===
1/8 finals
Eleni Pjollaj (ITA)	7
Anastasiya Alpyeyeva (UKR)	2

Quarterfinals
Anna Schell (GER)	2^{F}
Eleni Pjollaj (ITA)	0
Kendra Dacher (FRA)	WO
Emese Elekes (HUN)
Alexandra Anghel (ROU)	4
Patrycja Sperka (POL)	1
Yuliana Yaneva (BUL)	3
Buse Tosun (TUR)	4

Semifinals
Anna Schell (GER)	9
Kendra Dacher (FRA)	4
Alexandra Anghel (ROU)	1
Buse Tosun (TUR)	7

Final
Anna Schell (GER)	7^{F}
Buse Tosun (TUR)	6

=== Repechage ===
Bronze medal match
Eleni Pjollaj (ITA)	2
Kendra Dacher (FRA)	8^{F}
Yuliana Yaneva (BUL)	3
Alexandra Anghel (ROU)	3

== Final standing ==
Rank	Wrestler	UWW Points
1st place, gold medalist(s)	Anna Schell (GER)	10000
2nd place, silver medalist(s)	Buse Tosun (TUR)	8000
3rd place, bronze medalist(s)	Kendra Dacher (FRA)	6500
3rd place, bronze medalist(s)	Yuliana Yaneva (BUL)	6500
5	Alexandra Anghel (ROU)	5000
5	Eleni Pjollaj (ITA)	5000
7	Anastasiya Alpyeyeva (UKR)	4400
8	Patrycja Sperka (POL)	4000
9	Emese Elekes (HUN)	3500
