= 2023 European Wrestling Championships – Women's freestyle 72 kg =

Wrestling competition

Women's freestyle 72 kg at the 2023 European Wrestling Championships
- Venue: Arena Zagreb
- Location: Zagreb, Croatia
- Dates: 20-21 April
- Competitors: 12

Medalists
gold medal	Alexandra Anghel	Romania
silver medal	Buse Tosun	Turkey
bronze medal	Pauline Lecarpentier	France
bronze medal	Dalma Caneva	Italy

The women's freestyle 72 kg is a competition featured at the 2023 European Wrestling Championships, and will held in Zagreb, Croatia on April 20 and 21.

== Results ==
Legend

- F — Won by fall

Round of 16
Sofia Georgieva (BUL)	1
Pauline Lecarpentier (FRA)	2
Nigar Mirzazada (AZE)	0
Liudmyla Pavlovets (UKR)	10
Milla Anđelić (CRO)	1
Patrycja Sperka (POL)	11
Emilija Jakovljević (SRB)	1
Ilana Kratysh (ISR)	11

Quarterfinals
Alexandra Anghel (ROU)	5
Pauline Lecarpentier (FRA)	1
Liudmyla Pavlovets (UKR)	2
Lilly Schneider (GER)	1
Dalma Caneva (ITA)	5
Patrycja Sperka (POL)	0
Ilana Kratysh (ISR)	0
Buse Tosun (TUR)	6^{F}

Semifinals
Alexandra Anghel (ROU)	5
Liudmyla Pavlovets (UKR)	1
Dalma Caneva (ITA)	0
Buse Tosun (TUR)	10

Final
Alexandra Anghel (ROU)	4
Buse Tosun (TUR)	4

Bronze medal match
Pauline Lecarpentier (FRA)	5
Liudmyla Pavlovets (UKR)	1
Ilana Kratysh (ISR)	0
Dalma Caneva (ITA)	4^{F}

== Final standing ==
Rank	Athlete
1st place, gold medalist(s)	Alexandra Anghel (ROU)
2nd place, silver medalist(s)	Buse Tosun (TUR)
3rd place, bronze medalist(s)	Pauline Lecarpentier (FRA)
3rd place, bronze medalist(s)	Dalma Caneva (ITA)
5	Liudmyla Pavlovets (UKR)
5	Ilana Kratysh (ISR)
7	Patrycja Sperka (POL)
8	Lilly Schneider (GER)
9	Sofia Georgieva (BUL)
10	Milla Anđelić (CRO)
11	Emilija Jakovljević (SRB)
12	Nigar Mirzazada (AZE)
