= Anna Schell =

German freestyle wrestler

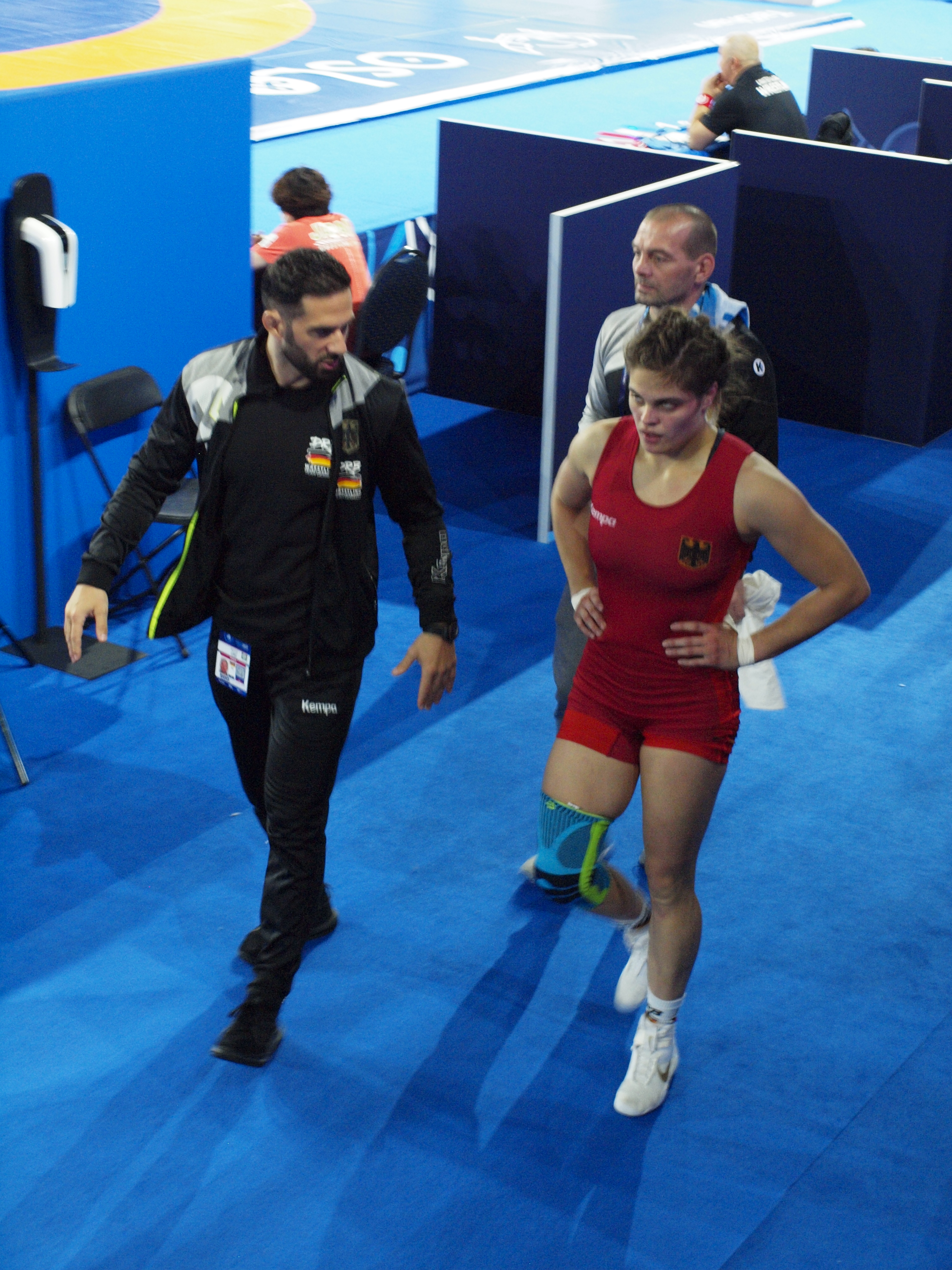
- Anna Schell at the 2021 World Wrestling Championships in Oslo, Norway

Personal information
- Full name: Anna Carmen Schell
- Born: 3 August 1993 (age 32) Aschaffenburg, Germany
- Height: 175 cm (5 ft 9 in)

Sport
- Country: Germany
- Sport: Amateur wrestling
- Weight class: 68 kg; 72 kg
- Event: Freestyle
Medal record
Women's freestyle wrestling
Representing Germany
World Championships
Bronze medal – third place	2019 Nur-Sultan	68 kg
Bronze medal – third place	2021 Oslo	72 kg
European Championships
Gold medal – first place	2022 Budapest	72 kg
Silver medal – second place	2019 Bucharest	72 kg
Yasar Dogu Tournament
Gold medal – first place	2021 Istanbul	68 kg
Silver medal – second place	2022 Istanbul	72 kg
Bronze medal – third place	2019 Istanbul	68 kg
Bronze medal – third place	2018 Istanbul	68 kg

Anna Carmen Schell (born 3 August 1993) is a German freestyle wrestler. She is a two-time bronze medalist at the World Wrestling Championships and a two-time medalist, including gold, at the European Wrestling Championships. She also represented Germany at the 2020 Summer Olympics in Tokyo, Japan.

== Career ==
In 2017, Schell lost her bronze medal match against Svetlana Saenko of Moldova in the 75 kg event at the European Wrestling Championships held in Novi Sad, Serbia. In 2018, she competed in the 68 kg event at the World Wrestling Championships held in Budapest, Hungary where she was eliminated in her first match by Blessing Oborududu of Nigeria.

In 2019, Schell won the silver medal in the 72 kg event at the European Wrestling Championships held in Bucharest, Romania. In 2020, she competed in the 68 kg event without winning a medal. She lost her bronze medal match against Danutė Domikaitytė of Lithuania.

At the 2019 World Wrestling Championships held in Nur-Sultan, Kazakhstan, she won one of the bronze medals in the 68 kg event. She defeated Sara Dosho of Japan in her bronze medal match.

Schell competed in the 68 kg event at the 2020 Summer Olympics in Tokyo, Japan where she was eliminated in her second match by eventual bronze medalist Alla Cherkasova of Ukraine. Two months after the Olympics, she won one of the bronze medals in the 72 kg event at the 2021 World Wrestling Championships in Oslo, Norway. In her bronze medal match she defeated Enkh-Amaryn Davaanasan of Mongolia.

In 2022, Schell won the silver medal in the 72 kg event at the Yasar Dogu Tournament held in Istanbul, Turkey. In April 2022, she won the gold medal in the 72 kg event at the European Wrestling Championships held in Budapest, Hungary. A few months later, she won the silver medal in her event at the Matteo Pellicone Ranking Series 2022 held in Rome, Italy.

== Achievements ==
Year	Tournament	Location	Result	Event
2019	European Championships	Bucharest, Romania	2nd	Freestyle 72 kg
2019	World Championships	Nur-Sultan, Kazakhstan	3rd	Freestyle 68 kg
2021	World Championships	Oslo, Norway	3rd	Freestyle 72 kg
2022	European Championships	Budapest, Hungary	1st	Freestyle 72 kg
