= 2023 U23 World Wrestling Championships – Women's freestyle 76 kg =

Wrestling competitions

Women's freestyle 76 kg at the 2023 U23 World Championships
- Venue: Tirana Olympic Park
- Dates: 25–26 October
- Competitors: 12 from 10 nations

Medalists
| gold medal | Reetika Hooda |
| silver medal | Kennedy Blades | United States |
| bronze medal | Kamilė Gaučaitė | Lithuania |
| bronze medal | Anastasiya Alpyeyeva | Ukraine |

The women's freestyle 76 kilograms is a competition featured at the 2023 U23 World Wrestling Championships, and will held in Tirana, Albania on 25 and 26 October 2023.

This freestyle wrestling competition consists of a single-elimination tournament, with a repechage used to determine the winner of two bronze medals. The two finalists face off for gold and silver medals. Each wrestler who loses to one of the two finalists moves into the repechage, culminating in a pair of bronze medal matches featuring the semifinal losers each facing the remaining repechage opponent from their half of the bracket.

== Results ==
Legend

- F — Won by fall

=== Main bracket ===
Round of 16
Mehtap Gültekin (TUR) | 7
Vianne Rouleau (CAN) | 4
Kennedy Blades (USA) | 10
Patrycja Słomska (POL) | 0
Anastasiya Alpyeyeva (UKR) | 4^{F}
Elvira Braun (SWE) | 0
Reetika Hooda (UWW) | 9
Nodoka Yamamoto (JPN) | 1

Quarterfinals
Kamilė Gaučaitė (LTU) | 4
Mehtap Gültekin (TUR) | 2
Kennedy Blades (USA) | 10
Inkara Zhanatayeva (KAZ) | 0
Fanni Nađ (SRB) | 0
Anastasiya Alpyeyeva (UKR) | 11
Reetika Hooda (UWW) | 16
Rita Talismanova (ANA) | 6

Semifinals
Kamilė Gaučaitė (LTU) | 0
Kennedy Blades (USA) | 10
Anastasiya Alpyeyeva (UKR) | 0
Reetika Hooda (UWW) | 5

Final
Kennedy Blades (USA) | 2
Reetika Hooda (UWW) | 9

=== Repechage ===
Repechage round 1
Patrycja Słomska (POL) | 8
Inkara Zhanatayeva (KAZ) | 0
Nodoka Yamamoto (JPN) | 10
Rita Talismanova (ANA) | 8

Bronze medals
Patrycja Słomska (POL) | 3
Kamilė Gaučaitė (LTU) | 7
Nodoka Yamamoto (JPN) | 2
Anastasiya Alpyeyeva (UKR) | 4^{F}

== Final standing ==
| Rank | Athlete |
|---|---|
| 1st place, gold medalist(s) | Reetika Hooda (UWW) |
| 2nd place, silver medalist(s) | Kennedy Blades (USA) |
| 3rd place, bronze medalist(s) | Kamilė Gaučaitė (LTU) |
| 3rd place, bronze medalist(s) | Anastasiya Alpyeyeva (UKR) |
| 5 | Patrycja Słomska (POL) |
| 5 | Nodoka Yamamoto (JPN) |
| 7 | Mehtap Gültekin (TUR) |
| 8 | Rita Talismanova (ANA) |
| 9 | Vianne Rouleau (CAN) |
| 10 | Elvira Braun (SWE) |
| 11 | Fanni Nađ (SRB) |
| 12 | Inkara Zhanatayeva (KAZ) |
