= 2022 U23 World Wrestling Championships – Women's freestyle 72 kg =

Wrestling competitions

Women's freestyle 72 kg at the 2022 U23 World Championships
- Venue: Pontevedra Municipal Sports Hall
- Dates: 20–21 October
- Competitors: 11 from 11 nations

Medalists
gold medal	Amit Elor	United States
silver medal	Wiktoria Chołuj	Poland
bronze medal	Kendra Dacher	France
bronze medal	Sumire Niikura	Japan

The women's freestyle 72 kilograms is a competition featured at the 2022 U23 World Wrestling Championships, and was held in Pontevedra, Spain on 20 and 21 October 2022. The qualification rounds were held on 20 October while medal matches were held on the 2nd day of the competition. A total of 11 wrestlers competed in this event, limited to athletes whose body weight was less than 72 kilograms.

This freestyle wrestling competition consists of a single-elimination tournament, with a repechage used to determine the winner of two bronze medals. The two finalists face off for gold and silver medals. Each wrestler who loses to one of the two finalists moves into the repechage, culminating in a pair of bronze medal matches featuring the semifinal losers each facing the remaining repechage opponent from their half of the bracket.

== Results ==
Legend

- F — Won by fall

=== Main bracket ===
Round of 16
Alexandra Zaitseva (KAZ)	1
Larisa Nițu (ROU)	4
Iryna Zablotska (UKR)	6
Lilly Schneider (GER)	4
Nazar Batır (TUR)	0
Sumire Niikura (JPN)	10

Quarterfinals
María Ceballos (COL)	2
Larisa Nițu (ROU)	4
Kendra Dacher (FRA)	2
Amit Elor (USA)	13^{F}
Wiktoria Chołuj (POL)	6
Iryna Zablotska (UKR)	1
Sumire Niikura (JPN)	8
Brianna Fraser (CAN)	0

Semifinals
Larisa Nițu (ROU)	0
Amit Elor (USA)	4^{F}
Wiktoria Chołuj (POL)	3
Sumire Niikura (JPN)	1

Final
Amit Elor (USA)	11
Wiktoria Chołuj (POL)	0

=== Repechage ===
Bronze medals
Kendra Dacher (FRA)	12
Larisa Nițu (ROU)	2
Iryna Zablotska (UKR)	1
Sumire Niikura (JPN)	8

== Final standing ==
Rank	Athlete
1st place, gold medalist(s)	Amit Elor (USA)
2nd place, silver medalist(s)	Wiktoria Chołuj (POL)
3rd place, bronze medalist(s)	Kendra Dacher (FRA)
3rd place, bronze medalist(s)	Sumire Niikura (JPN)
5	Larisa Nițu (ROU)
5	Iryna Zablotska (UKR)
7	Lilly Schneider (GER)
8	María Ceballos (COL)
9	Alexandra Zaitseva (KAZ)
10	Brianna Fraser (CAN)
11	Nazar Batır (TUR)
