= 2019 World Wrestling Championships – Women's freestyle 72 kg =

Women's freestyle 72 kg at the 2019 World Championships
- Venue: Barys Arena
- Dates: 17–18 September 2019
- Competitors: 12 from 12 nations

Medalists
gold medal	Natalia Vorobieva	Russia
silver medal	Alina Berezhna	Ukraine
bronze medal	Masako Furuichi	Japan
bronze medal	Paliha Paliha	China

The women's freestyle 72 kilograms is a competition featured at the 2019 World Wrestling Championships, and was held in Nur-Sultan, Kazakhstan on 17 and 18 September.

This freestyle wrestling competition consists of a single-elimination tournament, with a repechage used to determine the winner of two bronze medals. The two finalists face off for gold and silver medals. Each wrestler who loses to one of the two finalists moves into the repechage, culminating in a pair of bronze medal matches featuring the semifinal losers each facing the remaining repechage opponent from their half of the bracket.

Each bout consists of a single round within a six-minute limit including two halves of three minutes. The wrestler who scores more points is the winner.

Russia won the gold medal through Natalia Vorobieva, who beat her Ukrainian opponent, 2013 World Championship gold medalist Alina Berezhna in a close match 4–2. Vorobieva took the lead and finished the first period 2–0, she later added another two points by a takedown. Berezhna only managed to scare a two points takedown in last few seconds. Masako Furuichi of Japan and Paliha Paliha from China shared the bronze medals. Furuichi beat Zhamila Bakbergenova from Kazakhstan in a close match 2–1 and Paliha managed to beat the American Victoria Francis in another close match 2–1.

== Results ==
Legend

- F — Won by fall

=== Main bracket ===
Round of 16
Beste Altuğ (TUR)	4
Komal Bhagwan Gole (IND)	1
Masako Furuichi (JPN)	4
Natalia Vorobieva (RUS)	6
Paliha Paliha (CHN)	4
Banzragchiin Oyuunsüren (MGL)	1
Dejah Slater (CAN)	0
Victoria Francis (USA)	5^{F}

Quarterfinals
Zhamila Bakbergenova (KAZ)	11
Beste Altuğ (TUR)	0
Natalia Vorobieva (RUS)	12
Alexandra Anghel (ROU)	2
Jeong Seo-yeon (KOR)	2
Paliha Paliha (CHN)	4^{F}
Victoria Francis (USA)	0
Alina Berezhna (UKR)	4

Semifinals
Zhamila Bakbergenova (KAZ)	0
Natalia Vorobieva (RUS)	13
Paliha Paliha (CHN)	0
Alina Berezhna (UKR)	7

Final
Natalia Vorobieva (RUS)	4
Alina Berezhna (UKR)	2

=== Repechage ===
Repechage round 1
Masako Furuichi (JPN)	11
Alexandra Anghel (ROU)	0

Bronze medals
Masako Furuichi (JPN)	2
Zhamila Bakbergenova (KAZ)	0
Victoria Francis (USA)	1
Paliha (CHN)	2
