= 2023 U23 World Wrestling Championships – Women's freestyle 72 kg =

Wrestling competitions

Women's freestyle 72 kg at the 2023 U23 World Championships
- Venue: Tirana Olympic Park
- Dates: 26–27 October
- Competitors: 14 from 11 nations

Medalists
gold medal	Amit Elor	United States
silver medal	Jyoti Berwal
bronze medal	Viktoryia Radzkova	Authorised Neutral Athletes
bronze medal	Iryna Zablotska	Ukraine

The women's freestyle 72 kilograms is a competition featured at the 2023 U23 World Wrestling Championships, and will held in Tirana, Albania on 26 and 27 October 2023.

This freestyle wrestling competition consists of a single-elimination tournament, with a repechage used to determine the winner of two bronze medals. The two finalists face off for gold and silver medals. Each wrestler who loses to one of the two finalists moves into the repechage, culminating in a pair of bronze medal matches featuring the semifinal losers each facing the remaining repechage opponent from their half of the bracket.

== Results ==
Legend

- F — Won by fall

=== Main Bracket ===
Round of 16
Emilia Creciun (MDA)	0
Wiktoria Chołuj (POL)	11
Viktoryia Radzkova (ANA)	15
Nyla Burgess (CAN)	4
Amit Elor (USA)	4^{F}
Zaineb Sghaier (TUN)	0
Bükrenaz Sert (TUR)	6
Marziya Sadigova (AZE)	3
Anastassiya Panassovich (KAZ)	4
Misaki Wachi (JPN)	3
Milla Anđelić (CRO)	0
Iryna Zablotska (UKR)	10

Quarterfinals
Marina Surovtseva (ANA)	2
Wiktoria Chołuj (POL)	3
Viktoryia Radzkova (ANA)	0
Amit Elor (USA)	4^{F}
Bükrenaz Sert (TUR)	2
Anastassiya Panassovich (KAZ)	1
Iryna Zablotska (UKR)	0
Jyoti Berwal (UWW)	9

Semifinals
Wiktoria Chołuj (POL)	0
Amit Elor (USA)	5
Bükrenaz Sert (TUR)	0
Jyoti Berwal (UWW)	7

Final
Amit Elor (USA)	10
Jyoti Berwal (UWW)	0

=== Repechage ===
Repechage round 1
Zaineb Sghaier (TUN)	6
Viktoryia Radzkova (ANA)	6

Bronze medals
Viktoryia Radzkova (ANA)	3
Wiktoria Chołuj (POL)	3
Iryna Zablotska (UKR)	12
Bükrenaz Sert (TUR)	2
