= 2023 World Wrestling Championships – Women's freestyle 72 kg =

Wrestling competitions

Women's freestyle 72 kg at the 2023 World Championships
- Venue: Štark Arena
- Dates: 20–21 September 2023
- Competitors: 18 from 16 nations

Medalists
gold medal	Amit Elor	United States
silver medal	Enkh-Amaryn Davaanasan	Mongolia
bronze medal	Zhamila Bakbergenova	Kazakhstan
bronze medal	Miwa Morikawa	Japan

The women's freestyle 72 kilograms is a competition featured at the 2023 World Wrestling Championships, and was held in Belgrade, Serbia on 20 and 21 September 2023.

This freestyle wrestling competition consists of a single-elimination tournament, with a repechage used to determine the winner of two bronze medals. The two finalists face off for gold and silver medals. Each wrestler who loses to one of the two finalists moves into the repechage, culminating in a pair of bronze medal matches featuring the semifinal losers each facing the remaining repechage opponent from their half of the bracket.

== Results ==
Legend

- F — Won by fall
- WO — Won by walkover

=== Final ===
Final
Enkh-Amaryn Davaanasan (MGL)	2
Amit Elor (USA)	8

=== Top half ===
Round of 32
Ksenia Burakova (AIN)	2
Jyoti Berwal (UWW)	2

Round of 16
Zhamila Bakbergenova (KAZ)	12^{F}
Fani Nađ (SRB)	0
Ksenia Burakova (AIN)	5
Ilana Kratysh (ISR)	2
Shauna Kuebeck (CAN)	0
Sofiya Georgieva (BUL)	4
Natalia Strzałka (POL)	1
Enkh-Amaryn Davaanasan (MGL)	8

Quarterfinals
Zhamila Bakbergenova (KAZ)	7
Ksenia Burakova (AIN)	1
Sofiya Georgieva (BUL)	1
Enkh-Amaryn Davaanasan (MGL)	9

Semifinals
Zhamila Bakbergenova (KAZ)	2
Enkh-Amaryn Davaanasan (MGL)	6

=== Bottom half ===
Round of 32
Miwa Morikawa (JPN)	3
Nurzat Nurtaeva (KGZ)	0

Round of 16
Dalma Caneva (ITA)	0
Manola Skobelska (UKR)	10
~~Patricia El-Nour (SUD)~~
Kendra Dacher (FRA)	WO
Qiandegenchagan (CHN)	2
Miwa Morikawa (JPN)	5
Nesrin Baş (TUR)	0
Amit Elor (USA)	7

Quarterfinals
Manola Skobelska (UKR)	4
Kendra Dacher (FRA)	9
Miwa Morikawa (JPN)	0
Amit Elor (USA)	6

Semifinals
Kendra Dacher (FRA)	2
Amit Elor (USA)	12

=== Repechage ===
Repechage round 2
Natalia Strzałka (POL)	6
Sofiya Georgieva (BUL)	1
Nesrin Baş (TUR)	0
Miwa Morikawa (JPN)	6

Bronze medals
Natalia Strzałka (POL)	1
Zhamila Bakbergenova (KAZ)	4
Miwa Morikawa (JPN)	4
Kendra Dacher (FRA)	2

== Final standing ==
Rank	Athlete
1st place, gold medalist(s)	Amit Elor (USA)
2nd place, silver medalist(s)	Enkh-Amaryn Davaanasan (MGL)
3rd place, bronze medalist(s)	Zhamila Bakbergenova (KAZ)
3rd place, bronze medalist(s)	Miwa Morikawa (JPN)
5	Natalia Strzałka (POL)
5	Kendra Dacher (FRA)
7	Ksenia Burakova (AIN)
8	Manola Skobelska (UKR)
9	Sofiya Georgieva (BUL)
10	Jyoti Berwal (UWW)
11	Qiandegenchagan (CHN)
12	Ilana Kratysh (ISR)
13	Nurzat Nurtaeva (KGZ)
14	Shauna Kuebeck (CAN)
15	Dalma Caneva (ITA)
16	Fani Nađ (SRB)
17	Nesrin Baş (TUR)
—	Patricia El-Nour (SUD)
