= Masako Furuichi =

Japanese freestyle wrestler

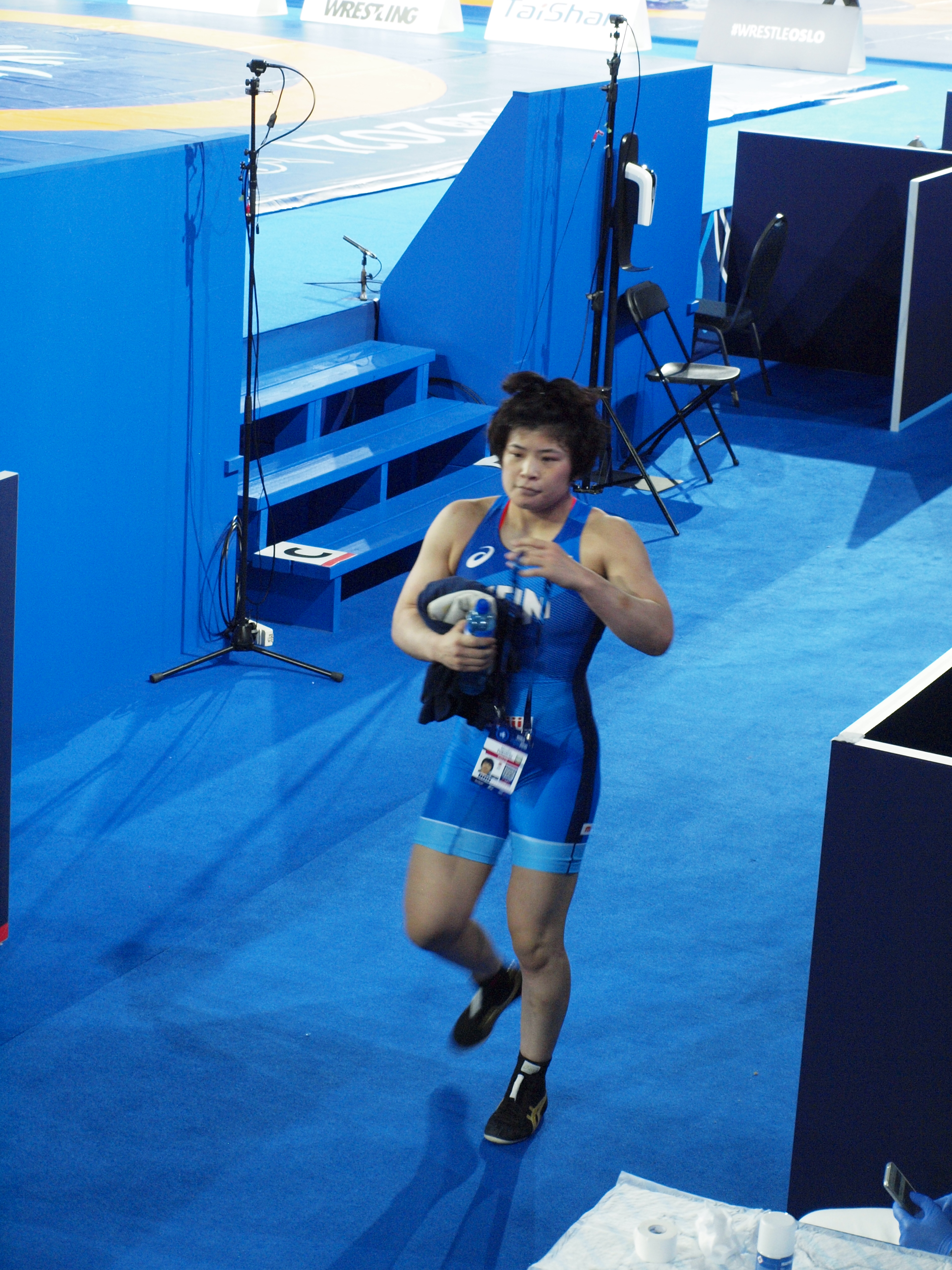
- Masako Furuichi at the 2021 World Wrestling Championships in Oslo, Norway

Personal information
- Born: 20 October 1996 (age 29) Kikuchi, Kumamoto, Kyushu Island, Japan
- Height: 165 cm (5 ft 5 in)

Sport
- Country: Japan
- Sport: Amateur wrestling
- Weight class: 72 kg
- Event: Freestyle
Medal record
Women's freestyle wrestling
Representing Japan
World Championships
Gold medal – first place	2021 Oslo	72 kg
Bronze medal – third place	2019 Nur-Sultan	72 kg
Bronze medal – third place	2022 Belgrade	72 kg
Asian Championships
Silver medal – second place	2017 New Delhi	75 kg
Bronze medal – third place	2018 Bishkek	72 kg
Golden Grand Prix Ivan Yarygin
Silver medal – second place	2018 Krasnoyarsk	72 kg
World U23 Championships
Gold medal – first place	2019 Budapest	68 kg

Masako Furuichi (Japanese: 古市 雅子, Hepburn: Furuichi Masako; born 20 October 1996) Masako Furuichi (born 20 October 1996) is a Japanese freestyle wrestler. She won the gold medal in the women's 72 kg event at the 2021 World Wrestling Championships in Oslo, Norway. She is also a two-time medalist at the Asian Wrestling Championships.

== Career ==
Furuichi won the silver medal in the women's 75 kg event at the 2017 Asian Wrestling Championships held in New Delhi, India. In 2018, she won the bronze medal in the women's 72 kg event at the Asian Wrestling Championships held in Bishkek, Kyrgyzstan.

In 2019, Furuichi won one of the bronze medals in the women's 72 kg event at the World Wrestling Championships held in Nur-Sultan, Kazakhstan. She won the gold medal in the 72 kg event at the 2021 World Wrestling Championships in Oslo, Norway.

Furuichi won one of the bronze medals in the 72 kg event at the 2022 World Wrestling Championships held in Belgrade, Serbia, behind American gold medal winner Amit Elor and Kazakh silver medal winner Zhamila Bakbergenova.

== Achievements ==
Year	Tournament	Location	Result	Event
2017	Asian Championships	New Delhi, India	2nd	Freestyle 75 kg
2018	Asian Championships	Bishkek, Kyrgyzstan	3rd	Freestyle 72 kg
2019	World Championships	Nur-Sultan, Kazakhstan	3rd	Freestyle 72 kg
2021	World Championships	Oslo, Norway	1st	Freestyle 72 kg
2022	World Championships	Belgrade, Serbia	3rd	Freestyle 72 kg
