= Zhamila Bakbergenova =

Kazakh freestyle wrestler

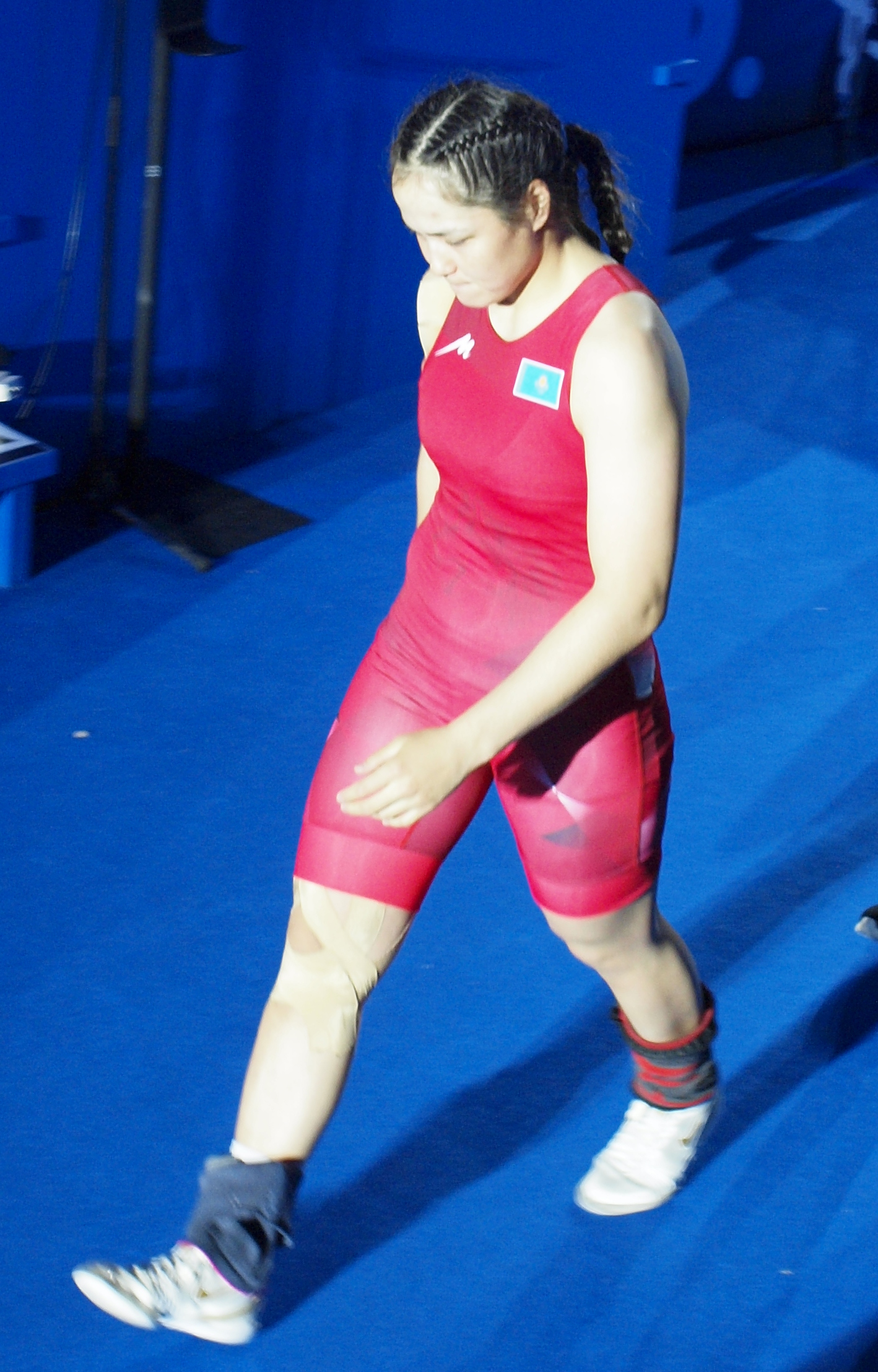
- Bakbergenova at the 2021 World Wrestling Championships in Oslo, Norway

Personal information
- Born: 6 January 1996 (age 30) Almaty, Kazakhstan
- Height: 1.68 m (5 ft 6 in)
- Weight: 72 kg (159 lb; 11.3 st)

Sport
- Country: Kazakhstan
- Sport: Amateur wrestling
- Weight class: 72 kg
- Event: Freestyle
- Coached by: Bakbergenuly Naukhannur, Temirov Nursultan
Medal record
Women's freestyle wrestling
Representing Kazakhstan
World Championships
Silver medal – second place	2021 Oslo	72 kg
Silver medal – second place	2022 Belgrade	72 kg
Silver medal – second place	2024 Tirana	72 kg
Bronze medal – third place	2023 Belgrade	72 kg
Asian Championships
Gold medal – first place	2020 New Delhi	72 kg
Gold medal – first place	2022 Ulaanbaatar	72 kg
Gold medal – first place	2023 Astana	72 kg
Gold medal – first place	2025 Amman	72 kg
Silver medal – second place	2021 Almaty	72 kg
Bronze medal – third place	2019 Xi'an	72 kg
Asian Games
Silver medal – second place	2022 Hangzhou	76 kg
Islamic Solidarity Games
Silver medal – second place	2017 Baku	69 kg
Bronze medal – third place	2021 Konya	72 kg
Yasar Dogu Tournament
Gold medal – first place	2022 Istanbul	72 kg
Bronze medal – third place	2021 Istanbul	68 kg
Golden Grand Prix Ivan Yarygin
Gold medal – first place	2026 Krasnoyarsk	72 kg
Silver medal – second place	2020 Krasnoyarsk	72 kg
Bronze medal – third place	2018 Krasnoyarsk	72 kg
Grand Prix
Gold medal – first place	2021 Rome	72 kg
Gold medal – first place	2022 Almaty	72 kg
Gold medal – first place	2022 New York	76 kg
Gold medal – first place	2023 Bishkek	72 kg
Gold medal – first place	2023 Budapest	72 kg
Gold medal – first place	2024 Budapest	72 kg
Gold medal – first place	2025 Tirana	72 kg
Gold medal – first place	2026 Tirana	72 kg
Silver medal – second place	2016 Minsk	69 kg
Silver medal – second place	2018 Ulaanbaatar	72 kg
Silver medal – second place	2019 Sassari	72 kg
Silver medal – second place	2024 Madrid	72 kg
Silver medal – second place	2025 Budapest	72 kg
Bronze medal – third place	2021 Warsaw	72 kg
World U23 Championships
Bronze medal – third place	2018 Bucharest	72 kg
World Junior Championships
Bronze medal – third place	2014 Zagreb	72 kg
Asian Junior Championships
Silver medal – second place	2014 Ulaanbaatar	72 kg
Silver medal – second place	2015 Nay Pyi Taw	67 kg
Bronze medal – third place	2016 Manila	72 kg
Asian Cadet Championships
Gold medal – first place	2013 Ulaanbaatar	70 kg

Zhamila Naukhannurqyzy Bakbergenova (Kazakh: Жәмила Науханнұрқызы Бақбергенова; born 6 January 1996) is a Kazakh freestyle wrestler. She is a four-time medalist in the women's 72 kg event at the World Wrestling Championships. She is a five-time medalist, including three gold medals, at the Asian Wrestling Championships. She is also a two-time medalist at the Islamic Solidarity Games.

== Career ==
Bakbergenova won the silver medal in the 69 kg event at the 2017 Islamic Solidarity Games held in Baku, Azerbaijan. In the final, she was defeated by Elis Manolova of Azerbaijan.

Bakbergenova competed in the 68 kg event at the 2018 Asian Games without winning a medal; she was eliminated from the competition in her first match by Ayana Gempei of Japan. In 2019, she won a bronze medal in the women's 72 kg event at the Asian Wrestling Championships held in Xi'an, China. In that same year, at the World Wrestling Championships held in Nur-Sultan, Kazakhstan, she lost her bronze medal match against Masako Furuichi in the women's freestyle 72 kg event.

In 2020, at the Golden Grand Prix Ivan Yarygin held in Krasnoyarsk, Russia, Bakbergenova won the silver medal in the women's 72 kg event. She won the gold medal in the 72 kg event at the Asian Wrestling Championships held in New Delhi, India.

In 2021, Bakbergenova won the silver medal in her event at the Asian Wrestling Championships held in Almaty, Kazakhstan. In April and May 2021, she competed at the Asian Olympic Qualification Tournament and the World Olympic Qualification Tournament respectively, hoping to qualify for the 2020 Summer Olympics in Tokyo, Japan. In June 2021, Bakbergenova won the bronze medal in her event at the 2021 Poland Open held in Warsaw, Poland. In October 2021, she won the silver medal in the 72 kg event at the World Wrestling Championships in Oslo, Norway.

In 2022, Bakbergenova won the gold medal in the 72 kg event at the Yasar Dogu Tournament held in Istanbul, Turkey. She won the gold medal in her event at the 2022 Asian Wrestling Championships held in Ulaanbaatar, Mongolia. Bakbergenova won one of the bronze medals in the 72 kg event at the 2021 Islamic Solidarity Games held in Konya, Turkey. She defeated Anta Sambou of Senegal in her bronze medal match.

Bakbergenova won the silver medal in the 72 kg event at the 2022 World Wrestling Championships held in Belgrade, Serbia, behind gold medal winner Amit Elor of the United States.

In 2023, she won the gold medal in her event at the Asian Wrestling Championships held in Astana, Kazakhstan. Bakbergenova won one of the bronze medals in the women's 72 kg event at the 2023 World Wrestling Championships held in Belgrade, Serbia, behind gold medal winner Amit Elor of the United States and silver medal winner Enkh-Amaryn Davaanasan of Mongolia. A few weeks later, she won the silver medal in the women's 76 kg event at the 2022 Asian Games held in Hangzhou, China. In the final, she lost against Aiperi Medet Kyzy of Kyrgyzstan.

Bakbergenova competed at the 2024 Asian Wrestling Olympic Qualification Tournament in Bishkek, Kyrgyzstan hoping to qualify for the 2024 Summer Olympics in Paris, France. She was eliminated in her third match and she did not qualify for the Olympics. In October 2024, she won the silver medal in the women's 72 kg event at the 2024 World Wrestling Championships held in Tirana, Albania. In the final, she was defeated by Ami Ishii of Japan.

== Achievements ==
Year	Tournament	Location	Result	Event
2017	Islamic Solidarity Games	Baku, Azerbaijan	2nd	Freestyle 69 kg
2019	Asian Championships	Xi'an, China	3rd	Freestyle 72 kg
2020	Asian Championships	New Delhi, India	1st	Freestyle 72 kg
2021	Asian Championships	Almaty, Kazakhstan	2nd	Freestyle 72 kg
2021	World Championships	Oslo, Norway	2nd	Freestyle 72 kg
2022	Asian Championships	Ulaanbaatar, Mongolia	1st	Freestyle 72 kg
2022	Islamic Solidarity Games	Konya, Turkey	3rd	Freestyle 72 kg
2022	World Championships	Belgrade, Serbia	2nd	Freestyle 72 kg
2023	Asian Championships	Astana, Kazakhstan	1st	Freestyle 72 kg
2023	World Championships	Belgrade, Serbia	3rd	Freestyle 72 kg
2023	Asian Games	Hangzhou, China	2nd	Freestyle 76 kg
2024	World Championships	Tirana, Albania	2nd	Freestyle 72 kg
2025	Asian Championships	Amman, Jordan	1st	Freestyle 72 kg
