= Justina Di Stasio =

Canadian wrestler (born 1992)

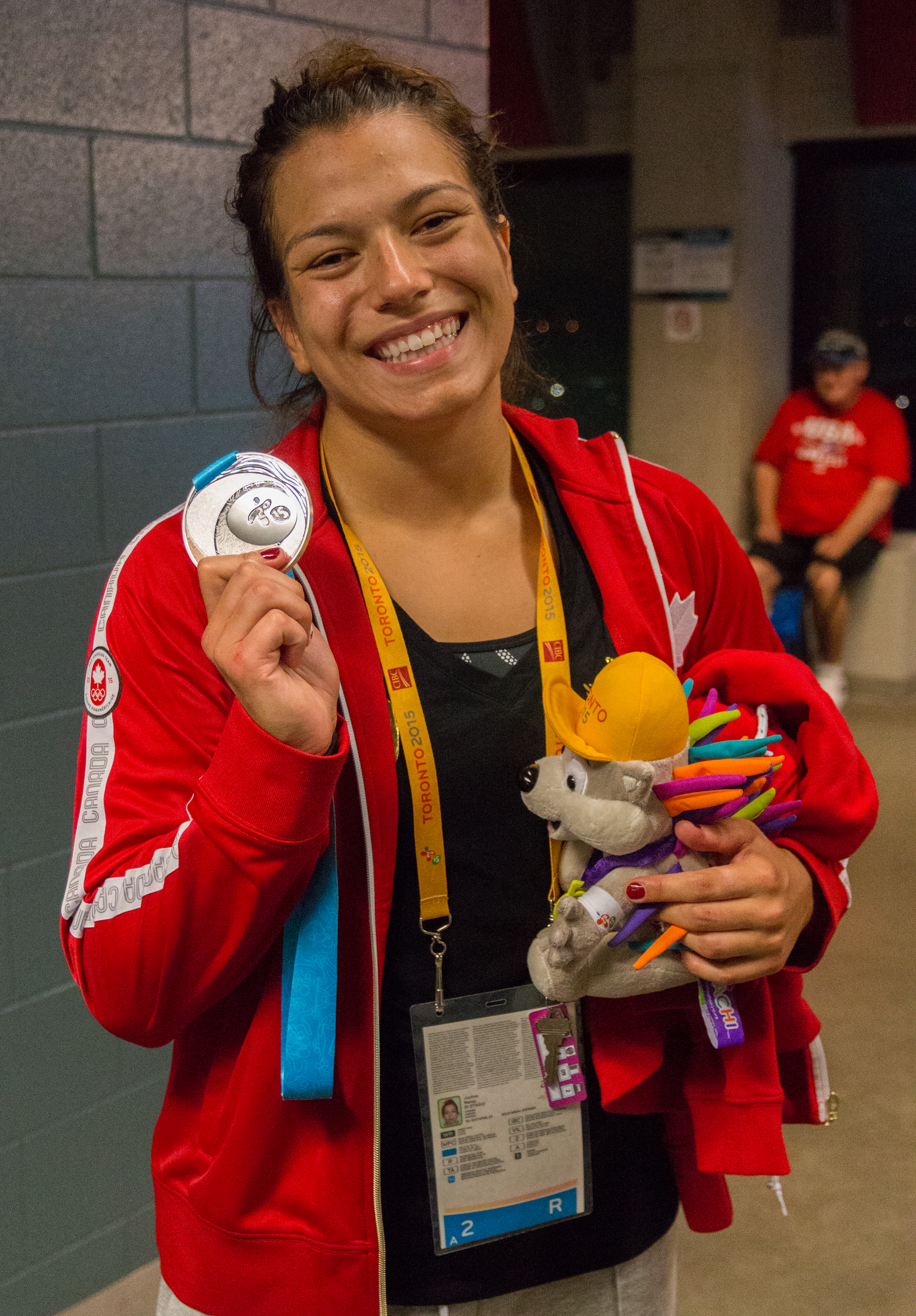
- Di Stasio holds her silver medal from the 2015 Pan American Games

Personal information
- Nationality: Canadian
- Born: November 22, 1992 (age 34) Burnaby, British Columbia, Canada
- Height: 171 cm (5 ft 7 in)
- Weight: 75 kg (165 lb)

Sport
- Sport: Freestyle wrestling
- Club: Burnaby Mountain wrestling club
Medal record
Women's freestyle wrestling
Representing Canada
World Championships
Gold medal – first place	2018 Budapest	72 kg
Bronze medal – third place	2017 Paris	75 kg
Commonwealth Games
Gold medal – first place	2022 Birmingham	76 kg
Pan American Games
Gold medal – first place	2019 Lima	76 kg
Silver medal – second place	2015 Toronto	75 kg
Pan American Championships
Gold medal – first place	2020 Ottawa	76 kg
Gold medal – first place	2017 Lauro de Freitas	75 kg
Bronze medal – third place	2022 Acapulco	76 kg
Bronze medal – third place	2023 Buenos Aires	76 kg

Justina Di Stasio (born November 22, 1992) is a Canadian wrestler of Italian and Cree descent.

== Career ==
In 2015, Di Stasio won a gold medal in the 75 kg weight class at the annual Pan American Wrestling Championships. She also won the 2015 Dave Schultz Memorial. Later in 2015, on home soil, Di Stasio won silver at the 2015 Pan American Games in Toronto.

In 2018, at the World Wrestling Championships in Budapest, Di Stasio won gold in the 72 kg event. She spoke about pride in her Indigenous roots, thanking her Cree mother, from the Norway House Cree Nation in Manitoba, for working to give her opportunities leading to her success.

Di Stasio won one of the bronze medals in her event at the 2022 Pan American Wrestling Championships held in Acapulco, Mexico. She won the gold medal in the women's 76 kg event at the 2022 Commonwealth Games held in Birmingham, England. She lost her bronze medal match in the 76 kg event at the 2022 World Wrestling Championships held in Belgrade, Serbia.

Di Stasio won the silver medal in the women's 76 kg event at the Grand Prix de France Henri Deglane 2023 held in Nice, France. She won one of the bronze medals in the women's 76 kg event at the 2023 Grand Prix Zagreb Open held in Zagreb, Croatia.

She won one of the bronze medals in her event at the 2023 Pan American Wrestling Championships held in Buenos Aires, Argentina. In 2024, at the Pan American Wrestling Olympic Qualification Tournament held in Acapulco, Mexico, she earned a quota place for Canada for the 2024 Summer Olympics in Paris, France. She defeated Saidy Chávez of Honduras and she then secured the quota place by defeating Linda Machuca of Argentina. She competed in the women's 76 kg event at the Olympics.

== Awards ==
- Women's Wrestling Hall of Fame
  - WWHOF Award (1 time)
    - Amateur Wrestler of the Year (2024)
