= Buse Tosun Çavuşoğlu =

Turkish freestyle wrestler

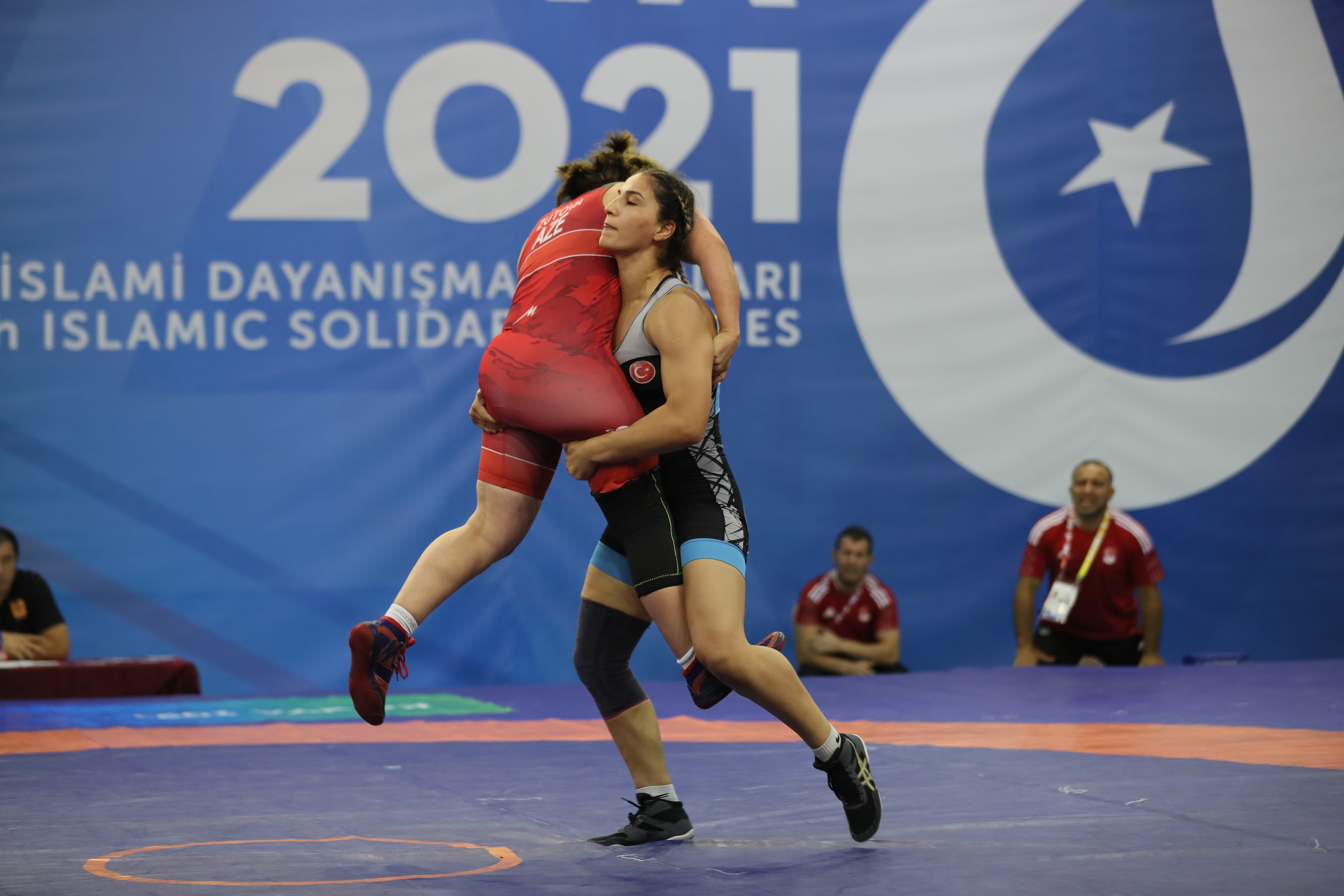
- Çavuşoğlu in 2022

Personal information
- Full name: Buse Tosun Çavuşoğlu
- Born: Buse Tosun; 5 December 1995 (age 30) İzmir, Turkey
- Education: Bartın University
- Height: 173 cm (5 ft 8 in)
- Weight: 72 kg (159 lb)

Sport
- Country: Turkey
- Sport: Amateur wrestling
- Weight class: 68 kg; 72 kg
- Event: Freestyle
- Club: Istanbul BB SK
- Coached by: Selahattin Karaman, Serkan Çavuşoğlu
Medal record
Women's freestyle wrestling
Representing Turkey
Olympic Games
Bronze medal – third place	2024 Paris	68 kg
World Championships
Gold medal – first place	2023 Belgrade	68 kg
Bronze medal – third place	2018 Budapest	72 kg
Bronze medal – third place	2021 Oslo	72 kg
European Championships
Gold medal – first place	2024 Bucharest	68 kg
Silver medal – second place	2022 Budapest	72 kg
Silver medal – second place	2023 Zagreb	72 kg
Bronze medal – third place	2016 Riga	69 kg
Bronze medal – third place	2018 Kaspiysk	68 kg
Bronze medal – third place	2025 Bratislava	68 kg
Bronze medal – third place	2026 Tirana	72 kg
Individual World Cup
Silver medal – second place	2020 Belgrade	72 kg
Islamic Solidarity Games
Gold medal – first place	2021 Konya	72 kg
Bronze medal – third place	2017 Baku	69 kg
Mediterranean Games
Gold medal – first place	2018 Tarragona	68 kg
Silver medal – second place	2022 Oran	68 kg
World University Championships
Gold medal – first place	2016 Çorum	69 kg
Yasar Dogu Tournament
Gold medal – first place	2016 Istanbul	69 kg
Gold medal – first place	2017 Istanbul	69 kg
Gold medal – first place	2019 Istanbul	72 kg
Gold medal – first place	2026 Antalya	72 kg
Silver medal – second place	2020 Istanbul	68 kg
Dan Kolov - Nikola Petrov Tournament
Gold medal – first place	2013 Plovdiv	63 kg
Gold medal – first place	2015 Sofia	63 kg
Gold medal – first place	2018 Sofia	69 kg
Gold medal – first place	2019 Russe	69 kg
Bronze medal – third place	2014 Sofia	63 kg
Grand Prix
Gold medal – first place	2022 Tunis	72 kg
Gold medal – first place	2024 Budapest	68 kg
Gold medal – first place	2026 Zagreb	72 kg
Silver medal – second place	2021 Warsaw	72 kg
Bronze medal – third place	2016 Klippan	69 kg
Bronze medal – third place	2016 Madrid	69 kg
Bronze medal – third place	2024 Zagreb	68 kg
World U23 Championships
Gold medal – first place	2018 Bucharest	72 kg
European U23 Championships
Gold medal – first place	2016 Russe	69 kg
Gold medal – first place	2018 Istanbul	68 kg
Bronze medal – third place	2015 Walbrzych	63 kg
World Juniors Championships
Silver medal – second place	2013 Sofia	63 kg
European Juniors Championships
Gold medal – first place	2013 Skopje	63 kg
Gold medal – first place	2014 Katowice	63 kg
Silver medal – second place	2015 Istanbul	63 kg

Buse Tosun Çavuşoğlu (born 5 December 1995) is a Turkish freestyle wrestler. She is a member of Istanbul BB SK. She won the gold medals at the 2023 World Wrestling Championships, and at the 2024 European Wrestling Championships. She also won one of the bronze medals in the women's 68 kg event at the 2024 Summer Olympics in Paris, France.

== Personal life ==
Buse Tosun graduated from Bartın University Faculty of Sports Sciences. She is currently pursuing her master's degree in sports sciences at the same university's Institute of Graduate Education. She married Serkan Çavuşoğlu on 13 August 2021.

== Career ==
She took part in the 63 kg event of the 2013 European Wrestling Championships in Tbilisi, Georgia and advanced to the semifinals. The same year, she won the gold medal in the 63 kg event at the European Junior Championships held in Skopje, Macefonia. At the 2013 World Championships in Budapest, Hungary, she lost in the event's first round.

She won the gold medal at the 2014 European Junior Women's Championships in Katowice, Poland. She participated at the 2014 World Championships in Tashkent, Uzbekistan without success.

Çavuşoğlu captured the bronze medal at the European Under-23 Championships in Wałbrzych, Poland. She competed in the 63 kg event of the 2015 European Games in Baku, Azerbaijan.

In 2016, she took the bronze medal in the 69 kg event of the European Championships held in Riga, Latvia. Çavuşoğlu captured the gold medal at the 2016 European Under-23 Championships in Ruse, Bulgaria. She earned a quota spot at the 2016 Summer Olympics with her performance of placing second at the 2016 European Wrestling Olympic Qualification Tournament in Zrenjanin, Serbia. At the 2016 Olympics in Rio de Janeiro, Brazil, Çavuşoğlu lost the repechage match in the 69 kg event, and failed so to win a medal. She won the gold medal in the 68 kg event of the 2018 European U23 Championship held in Istanbul, Turkey.

In 2018, she won the gold medal in the women's 68 kg event at the European U23 Wrestling Championship held in Istanbul, Turkey.

In 2020, she won the silver medal in the women's 72 kg event at the 2020 Individual Wrestling World Cup held in Belgrade, Serbia. In March 2021, she competed at the European Qualification Tournament in Budapest, Hungary hoping to qualify for the 2020 Summer Olympics in Tokyo, Japan. She did not qualify at this tournament and she also failed to qualify for the Olympics at the World Olympic Qualification Tournament held in Sofia, Bulgaria. In June 2021, she won the silver medal in her event at the 2021 Poland Open held in Warsaw, Poland. In October 2021, she won one of the bronze medals in the women's 72 kg event at the World Wrestling Championships in Oslo, Norway.

In 2022, she won the silver medal in the 72 kg event at the European Wrestling Championships held in Budapest, Hungary. A few months later, she also won the silver medal in the 68 kg event at the 2022 Mediterranean Games held in Oran, Algeria. She won the gold medal in her event at the 2022 Tunis Ranking Series event held in Tunis, Tunisia. She won the gold medal in the 72 kg event at the 2021 Islamic Solidarity Games held in Konya, Turkey. She lost her bronze medal match in the 72 kg event at the 2022 World Wrestling Championships held in Belgrade, Serbia.

In 2023, she won the silver medal in the 72 kg event at the European Wrestling Championships held in Zagreb, Croatia. She was beaten by Romanian Alexandra Nicoleta Anghel 4–4 and won the silver medal. In the quarterfinals, she won the semifinals with a 6–0 win fall over Russian-born Israeli Ilena Kratysh. After defeating Italian Dalma Caneva with a 10-0 technical superiority in this round, Çavuşoğlu reached the final.

Çavuşoğlu won the gold medal in the women's 68 kg event at the 2023 World Wrestling Championships held in Belgrade, Serbia. Çavuşoğlu reached the semifinals by defeating Moldovan Irina Rîngaci in the second round with a 4–2 pinfall, Mexican Alejandra Rivera in the third round with a 6–0 pinfall, and Czech Adéla Hanzlíčková 8–0 in the quarterfinals. In the semifinals, she defeated her Japanese opponent Ami Ishii by 11–1 technical superiority to reach the final. Çavuşoğlu also earned a quota place for Turkey for the 2024 Summer Olympics in Paris, France.

Çavuşoğlu won the gold medal at the 2024 European Wrestling Championships in Bucharest, Romania, in the women's freestyle 68 kg, defeating Ukraine's Tetiana Rizhko 5–2 in the final. She had reached the final by pinning Azerbaijan's Khanum Velieva, an individual independent competing for Russia, 4–1 in the quarterfinals and defeating Czech Adéla Hanzlíčková 10–9 in the semifinals.

At the 2024 Paris Olympics, she lost in the first round to Amit Elor of the United States, 10-2. She went on to win one of the bronze medals in the event.

Çavuşoğlu was named the "Woman Wrestler of the Year" in 2024 by the United World Wrestling for her rankings with a style best 60,200 points.

Buse Tosun Çavuşoğlu competed in the women's freestyle 68 kg event at the 2025 European Wrestling Championships. In the round of 16, she lost 3–2 to neutral athlete Alina Shauchuk. As Shauchuk advanced to the final, Tosun Çavuşoğlu qualified for the repechage. She defeated Albania’s Albina Drazhi by technical superiority 10–0 and then won the bronze medal match with a 9–6 victory over Ukraine's Manola Skobelska.
