= Kendra Dacher =

French freestyle wrestler

Personal information
- Full name: Kendra Augustine Jocelyne Dacher
- Born: 8 May 1999 (age 27)

Sport
- Country: France
- Sport: Amateur wrestling
- Weight class: 72 kg; 76 kg
- Event: Freestyle
Medal record
Women's freestyle wrestling
Representing France
European Championships
Bronze medal – third place	2022 Budapest	72 kg
Mediterranean Games
Bronze medal – third place	2022 Oran	76 kg
World U23 Championships
Bronze medal – third place	2022 Pontevedra	72 kg

Kendra Augustine Jocelyne Dacher (born 8 May 1999) is a French freestyle wrestler. She won one of the bronze medals in the 72 kg event at the 2022 European Wrestling Championships held in Budapest, Hungary. She also won one of the bronze medals in the 76 kg event at the 2022 Mediterranean Games held in Oran, Algeria.

== Career ==
In 2017, Dacher won one of the bronze medals in her event at the Paris International held in Paris, France. In that same year, she also won one of the bronze medals in her event at the European Juniors Wrestling Championships held in Dortmund, Germany.

Dacher competed in the 72 kg event at the 2020 European Wrestling Championships held in Rome, Italy where she was eliminated in her first match. She won the silver medal in the 72 kg event at the 2021 U23 World Wrestling Championships held in Belgrade, Serbia.

In 2022, Dacher competed in the 72 kg event at the World Wrestling Championships held in Belgrade, Serbia. She won one of the bronze medals in the 72 kg event at the 2022 U23 World Wrestling Championships held in Pontevedra, Spain, behind American gold medal winner Amit Elor and Polish silver medal winner Wiktoria Chołuj.

In 2023, Dacher lost her bronze medal match in the 65 kg event at the European Wrestling Championships held in Zagreb, Croatia. She also lost her bronze medal match in the 72 kg event at the 2023 World Wrestling Championships held in Belgrade, Serbia.

Dacher competed in the 72 kg event at the 2024 European Wrestling Championships held in Bucharest, Romania. She was eliminated in her first match.

== Achievements ==
Year	Tournament	Location	Result	Event
2022	European Championships	Budapest, Hungary	3rd	Freestyle 72 kg
2022	Mediterranean Games	Oran, Algeria	3rd	Freestyle 76 kg
