= Enkh-Amaryn Davaanasan =

Mongolian freestyle wrestler

Personal information
- Born: 6 April 1998 (age 28) Mongolia
- Height: 1.68 m (5 ft 6 in)
- Weight: 72 kg (159 lb)

Sport
- Country: Mongolia
- Sport: Women's freestyle wrestling
- Event: 72 kg
Medal record
Women's freestyle wrestling
Representing Mongolia
World Championships
| Silver medal – second place | 2023 Belgrade | 72 kg |
| Bronze medal – third place | 2026 Astana | 76 kg |
Asian Championships
| Bronze medal – third place | 2022 Ulaanbaatar | 72 kg |
| Bronze medal – third place | 2023 Astana | 72 kg |
Military World Games
| Bronze medal – third place | 2019 Wuhan | 68 kg |
World Military Championships
| Bronze medal – third place | 2024 Yerevan | 76 kg |
Golden Grand Prix Ivan Yarygin
| Silver medal – second place | 2019 Krasnoyarsk | 68 kg |
Asian Cadets Championships
| Silver medal – second place | 2014 Bangkok | 65 kg |
| Bronze medal – third place | 2015 New Delhi | 65 kg |

Enkh-Amaryn Davaanasan (Mongolian: Энх-Амарын Даваанасан, born 6 April 1998) is a Mongolian freestyle wrestler competing in the 72 kg division. She won the silver medal in the women's 72 kg event at the 2023 World Wrestling Championships held in Belgrade, Serbia.

== Career ==
Asian championship bronze medallist in 2022 and 2023. Military Games bronze medallist in 2019. Second at the military World Cup in 2018. Third at the World Cup in 2022 and fourth in 2019. Second at the Asian cadet championships in 2014; third in 2015.

In 2023, she competed in the women's 72 kg event at the 2023 World Wrestling Championships held in Belgrade, Serbia and won the silver medal, behind American gold medal winner Amit Elor.

She competed at the 2024 Asian Wrestling Olympic Qualification Tournament in Bishkek, Kyrgyzstan hoping to qualify for the 2024 Summer Olympics in Paris, France. She did not qualify for the Olympics at this event. She also competed at the 2024 World Wrestling Olympic Qualification Tournament held in Istanbul, Turkey and she earned a quota place for Mongolia for the Olympics.

== Achievements ==
| Year | Tournament | Location | Result | Event |
|---|---|---|---|---|
| 2023 | World Championships | Belgrade, Serbia | 2nd | Freestyle 72 kg |
| 2023 | Asian Championships | Astana, Kazakhstan | 3rd | Freestyle 72 kg |
| 2022 | Asian Championships | Ulaanbaatar, Mongolia | 3rd | Freestyle 72 kg |
| 2019 | Military World Games | Ulaanbaatar, Mongolia | 3rd | Freestyle 68 kg |
