= 2025 World Wrestling Championships – Women's freestyle 72 kg =

Wrestling competitions

Women's freestyle 72 kg at the 2025 World Championships
- Venue: Arena Zagreb
- Dates: 17–18 September 2025
- Competitors: 17 from 16 nations

Medalists
gold medal	Alla Belinska	Ukraine
silver medal	Nesrin Baş	Turkey
bronze medal	Nurzat Nurtaeva	Kyrgyzstan
bronze medal	Li Zelu	China

The women's freestyle 72 kilograms is a competition featured at the 2025 World Wrestling Championships, and was held in Zagreb, Croatia on 17 and 18 September 2025.

This freestyle wrestling competition consists of a single-elimination tournament, with a repechage used to determine the winner of two bronze medals. The two finalists face off for gold and silver medals. Each wrestler who loses to one of the two finalists moves into the repechage, culminating in a pair of bronze medal matches, featuring the semifinal losers each facing the remaining repechage opponent from their half of the bracket.

== Results ==
Legend

- F — Won by fall

=== Final ===
Final
Alla Belinska (UKR)	6^{F}
Nesrin Baş (TUR)	0

=== Top half ===
Round of 32
Alexandria Glaudé (USA)	9^{F}
Svetlana Oknazarova (UZB)	0

Round of 16
Zhamila Bakbergenova (KAZ)	3
Nurzat Nurtaeva (KGZ)	3
Alexandria Glaudé (USA)	3
Masako Furuichi (JPN)	2
Alla Belinska (UKR)	4^{F}
Veronika Vilk (CRO)	0
Augustė Gendvilaitė (LTU)	0
Pauline Lecarpentier (FRA)	10

Quarterfinals
Nurzat Nurtaeva (KGZ)	8
Alexandria Glaudé (USA)	4
Alla Belinska (UKR)	4^{F}
Pauline Lecarpentier (FRA)	2

Semifinals
Nurzat Nurtaeva (KGZ)	6
Alla Belinska (UKR)	11^{F}

=== Bottom half ===
Round of 32

Round of 16
Alexandra Anghel (ROU)	10^{F}
Lee Ji-seon (KOR)	0
Zsuzsanna Molnár (SVK)	4
Nesrin Baş (TUR)	9
Ksenia Burakova (UWW)	2
Li Zelu (CHN)	7
Jyoti Berwal (IND)	2
Zorigtyn Bolortungalag (MGL)	5^{F}

Quarterfinals
Alexandra Anghel (ROU)	0
Nesrin Baş (TUR)	3^{F}
Li Zelu (CHN)	10
Zorigtyn Bolortungalag (MGL)	0

Semifinals
Nesrin Baş (TUR)	9
Li Zelu (CHN)	6

=== Repechage ===
Repechage round 2
Veronika Vilk (CRO)	2
Pauline Lecarpentier (FRA)	4
Zsuzsanna Molnár (SVK)	0
Alexandra Anghel (ROU)	11

Bronze medals
Pauline Lecarpentier (FRA)	0
Nurzat Nurtaeva (KGZ)	5
Alexandra Anghel (ROU)	4
Li Zelu (CHN)	7

== Final standing ==
Rank	Athlete
1st place, gold medalist(s)	Alla Belinska (UKR)
2nd place, silver medalist(s)	Nesrin Baş (TUR)
3rd place, bronze medalist(s)	Nurzat Nurtaeva (KGZ)
3rd place, bronze medalist(s)	Li Zelu (CHN)
5	Pauline Lecarpentier (FRA)
5	Alexandra Anghel (ROU)
7	Alexandria Glaudé (USA)
8	Zorigtyn Bolortungalag (MGL)
9	Zsuzsanna Molnár (SVK)
10	Zhamila Bakbergenova (KAZ)
11	Masako Furuichi (JPN)
12	Ksenia Burakova (UWW)
13	Veronika Vilk (CRO)
14	Jyoti Berwal (IND)
15	Svetlana Oknazarova (UZB)
16	Augustė Gendvilaitė (LTU)
17	Lee Ji-seon (KOR)
