= 2023 European Wrestling Championships – Women's freestyle 68 kg =

Wrestling competition

Women's freestyle 68 kg at the 2023 European Wrestling Championships
- Venue: Arena Zagreb
- Location: Zagreb, Croatia
- Dates: 19-20 April
- Competitors: 12

Medalists
| gold medal | Yuliana Yaneva | Bulgaria |
| silver medal | Alla Belinska | Ukraine |
| bronze medal | Nesrin Baş | Turkey |
| bronze medal | Koumba Larroque | France |

The women's freestyle 68 kg is a competition featured at the 2023 European Wrestling Championships, and was held in Zagreb, Croatia on April 19 and 20.

== Results ==
Legend

- F — Won by fall
- WO — Won by walkover

Round of 16
Albina Drazhi (ALB) | 7^{F}
Danutė Domikaitytė (LTU) | 8
Nesrin Baş (TUR) | 0
Yuliana Yaneva (BUL) | 10
Tindra Sjöberg (SWE) | 4
Zsuzsanna Molnár (SVK) | 14
Natalia Strzałka (POL) | 10
Eyleen Sewina (GER) | 0

Quarterfinals
Adéla Hanzlíčková (CZE) | 10
Albina Drazhi (ALB) | 0
Yuliana Yaneva (BUL) | 13
Noémi Szabados (HUN) | 2
Alla Belinska (UKR) | 4^{F}
Zsuzsanna Molnár (SVK) | 0
Natalia Strzałka (POL) | 1
Koumba Larroque (FRA) | 5

Semifinals
Adéla Hanzlíčková (CZE)
Yuliana Yaneva (BUL) | WO
Alla Belinska (UKR) | 5^{F}
Koumba Larroque (FRA) | 0

Final
Yuliana Yaneva (BUL) | 10
Alla Belinska (UKR) | 3

Repechage round 1
Nesrin Baş (TUR) | 4
Noémi Szabados (HUN) | 0

Bronze medal match
Nesrin Baş (TUR) | WO
Adéla Hanzlíčková (CZE)
Zsuzsanna Molnár (SVK) | 0
Koumba Larroque (FRA) | 10

== Final standing ==
| Rank | Athlete |
|---|---|
| 1st place, gold medalist(s) | Yuliana Yaneva (BUL) |
| 2nd place, silver medalist(s) | Alla Belinska (UKR) |
| 3rd place, bronze medalist(s) | Nesrin Baş (TUR) |
| 3rd place, bronze medalist(s) | Koumba Larroque (FRA) |
| 5 | Adéla Hanzlíčková (CZE) |
| 5 | Zsuzsanna Molnár (SVK) |
| 7 | Albina Drazhi (ALB) |
| 8 | Natalia Strzałka (POL) |
| 9 | Tindra Sjöberg (SWE) |
| 10 | Noémi Szabados (HUN) |
| 11 | Danutė Domikaitytė (LTU) |
| 12 | Eyleen Sewina (GER) |
