= 2024 U23 World Wrestling Championships – Women's freestyle 68 kg =

Wrestling competitions

Women's freestyle 68 kg at the 2024 U23 World Championships
- Venue: Tirana Olympic Park
- Dates: 23–24 October
- Competitors: 20 from 18 nations

Medalists
gold medal	Ami Ishii	Japan
silver medal	Nesrin Baş	Turkey
bronze medal	Monika Sheoran	India
bronze medal	Alina Shauchuk	Authorised Neutral Athletes

The women's freestyle 68 is a competition featured at the 2024 U23 World Wrestling Championships, and was held in Tirana, Albania on 23 and 24 October 2024.

This freestyle wrestling competition consists of a single-elimination tournament, with a repechage used to determine the winner of two bronze medals. The two finalists face off for gold and silver medals. Each wrestler who loses to one of the two finalists moves into the repechage, culminating in a pair of bronze medal matches featuring the semifinal losers each facing the remaining repechage opponent from their half of the bracket.

== Results ==
Legend

- F — Won by fall

=== Final ===
Final
Ami Ishii (JPN)	8
Nesrin Baş (TUR)	1

=== Top half ===
Round of 32
Du Xinze (CHN)	4
Manola Skobelska (UKR)	3
Maria Panțîru (ROU)	0
Ami Ishii (JPN)	10

Round of 16
Tüvshinjargalyn Enkhjin (MGL)	5
Nurzat Nurtaeva (KGZ)	4
Du Xinze (CHN)	4
Noémi Szabados (HUN)	3
Monika Sheoran (IND)	0
Ami Ishii (JPN)	6^{F}
Zsuzsanna Molnár (SVK)	7^{F}
Nicoll Parrado (COL)	4

Quarterfinals
Tüvshinjargalyn Enkhjin (MGL)	2
Du Xinze (CHN)	3
Ami Ishii (JPN)	6^{F}
Zsuzsanna Molnár (SVK)	0

Semifinals
Du Xinze (CHN)	0
Ami Ishii (JPN)	10

=== Bottom half ===
Round of 32
Brooklyn Hays (USA)	10
Aleah Nickel (CAN)	2
Milla Anđelić (CRO)	0
Sophia Schäfle (GER)	11^{F}

Round of 16
Nesrin Baş (TUR)	6
Luciana Beda (MDA)	0
Brooklyn Hays (USA)	6
Beibit Seidualy (KAZ)	4
Emilija Jakovljević (SRB)	0
Sophia Schäfle (GER)	6
Elizaveta Petliakova (AIN)	2
Alina Shauchuk (AIN)	4

Quarterfinals
Nesrin Baş (TUR)	10
Brooklyn Hays (USA)	4
Sophia Schäfle (GER)	0
Alina Shauchuk (AIN)	7

Semifinals
Nesrin Baş (TUR)	3^{F}
Alina Shauchuk (AIN)	0

=== Repechage ===
Repechage round 1
Maria Panțîru (ROU)	6
Monika Sheoran (IND)	9

Repechage round 2
Monika Sheoran (IND)	3
Zsuzsanna Molnár (SVK)	1
Luciana Beda (MDA)	0
Brooklyn Hays (USA)	7

Bronze medals
Monika Sheoran (IND)	5
Du Xinze (CHN)	3
Brooklyn Hays (USA)	4
Alina Shauchuk (AIN)	6

== Final standing ==
Rank	Athlete
1st place, gold medalist(s)	Ami Ishii (JPN)
2nd place, silver medalist(s)	Nesrin Baş (TUR)
3rd place, bronze medalist(s)	Monika Sheoran (IND)
3rd place, bronze medalist(s)	Alina Shauchuk (AIN)
5	Du Xinze (CHN)
5	Brooklyn Hays (USA)
7	Sophia Schäfle (GER)
8	Zsuzsanna Molnár (SVK)
9	Tüvshinjargalyn Enkhjin (MGL)
10	Maria Panțîru (ROU)
11	Nurzat Nurtaeva (KGZ)
12	Beibit Seidualy (KAZ)
13	Manola Skobelska (UKR)
14	Noémi Szabados (HUN)
15	Elizaveta Petliakova (AIN)
16	Aleah Nickel (CAN)
17	Nicoll Parrado (COL)
18	Emilija Jakovljević (SRB)
19	Milla Anđelić (CRO)
20	Luciana Beda (MDA)
