= 2025 U23 World Wrestling Championships – Women's freestyle 68 kg =

Wrestling competitions

Women's freestyle 68 kg at the 2025 U23 World Championships
- Venue: SPC Vojvodina
- Dates: 23–24 October
- Competitors: 17 from 15 nations

Medalists
gold medal	Nesrin Baş	Turkey
silver medal	Alina Shevchenko
bronze medal	Srishti Janghu	India
bronze medal	Gulnura Tashtanbekova	Kyrgyzstan

The women's freestyle 68 kilograms is a competition featured at the 2025 U23 World Wrestling Championships, and was held in Novi Sad, Serbia on 23 and 24 October 2025.

This freestyle wrestling competition consists of a single-elimination tournament, with a repechage used to determine the winner of two bronze medals. The two finalists face off for gold and silver medals. Each wrestler who loses to one of the two finalists moves into the repechage, culminating in a pair of bronze medal matches featuring the semifinal losers each facing the remaining repechage opponent from their half of the bracket.

== Results ==
Legend

- F — Won by fall
- WO — Won by walkover

=== Final ===
Final
Alina Shevchenko (UWW)	0
Nesrin Baş (TUR)	10

=== Top half ===
Round of 32
Manola Skobelska (UKR)	3
Beibit Seidualy (KAZ)	1

Round of 16
Angelina Ellis-Toddington (CAN)	2
Srishti Janghu (IND)	12
Manola Skobelska (UKR)	WO
Seia Mochinaga (JPN)
Alina Shevchenko (UWW)	4
Karolina Pók (HUN)	0
Viktoryia Radzkova (UWW)	6^{F}
Brooklyn Hays (USA)	3

Quarterfinals
Srishti Janghu (IND)	6
Manola Skobelska (UKR)	3
Alina Shevchenko (UWW)	6
Viktoryia Radzkova (UWW)	5

Semifinals
Srishti Janghu (IND)	6
Alina Shevchenko (UWW)	10

=== Bottom half ===
Round of 32

Round of 16
Karolina Domaszuk (POL)	0
Nesrin Baş (TUR)	11
Gerda Barth (GER)	7
Du Chunshu (CHN)	0
Maria Panțîru (ROU)	3
Laura Godino (ITA)	4
Gulnura Tashtanbekova (KGZ)	12
Debanhi Tapia (MEX)	4

Quarterfinals
Nesrin Baş (TUR)	8^{F}
Gerda Barth (GER)	1
Laura Godino (ITA)	0
Gulnura Tashtanbekova (KGZ)	7

Semifinals
Nesrin Baş (TUR)	8
Gulnura Tashtanbekova (KGZ)	6

=== Repechage ===
Repechage round 2
Karolina Pók (HUN)	4
Viktoryia Radzkova (UWW)	2
Karolina Domaszuk (POL)	4
Gerda Barth (GER)	5

Bronze medals
Karolina Pók (HUN)	1
Srishti Janghu (IND)	6
Gerda Barth (GER)	2
Gulnura Tashtanbekova (KGZ)	4

== Final standing ==
Rank	Athlete
1st place, gold medalist(s)	Nesrin Baş (TUR)
2nd place, silver medalist(s)	Alina Shevchenko (UWW)
3rd place, bronze medalist(s)	Srishti Janghu (IND)
3rd place, bronze medalist(s)	Gulnura Tashtanbekova (KGZ)
5	Karolina Pók (HUN)
5	Gerda Barth (GER)
7	Manola Skobelska (UKR)
8	Viktoryia Radzkova (UWW)
9	Laura Godino (ITA)
10	Debanhi Tapia (MEX)
11	Karolina Domaszuk (POL)
12	Maria Panțîru (ROU)
13	Angelina Ellis-Toddington (CAN)
14	Beibit Seidualy (KAZ)
15	Brooklyn Hays (USA)
16	Seia Mochinaga (JPN)
17	Du Chunshu (CHN)
