= 2022 European Wrestling Championships – Women's freestyle 68 kg =

Wrestling competition

Women's freestyle 68 kg at the 2022 European Wrestling Championships
- Venue: BOK Sports Hall
- Location: Budapest, Hungary
- Dates: 30-31 March
- Competitors: 8

Medalists
gold medal	Irina Rîngaci	Moldova
silver medal	Pauline Lecarpentier	France
bronze medal	Alla Belinska	Ukraine
bronze medal	Natalia Strzałka	Poland

The women's freestyle 68 kg was a competition featured at the 2022 European Wrestling Championships, and was held in Budapest, Hungary on March 30 and 31.

== Results ==
Legend

- F — Won by fall

=== Main Bracket ===
Quarterfinals		Semifinals		Final
Adéla Hanzlíčková (CZE)	2^{F}
Roxana Capezan (ROU)	0	Adéla Hanzlíčková (CZE)	9
Alla Belinska (UKR)	0	Irina Rîngaci (MDA)	13^{F}
Irina Rîngaci (MDA)	12^{F}			Irina Rîngaci (MDA)	10
Pauline Lecarpentier (FRA)	3			Pauline Lecarpentier (FRA)	0
Noémi Szabados (HUN)	0	Pauline Lecarpentier (FRA)	3
Aslı Demir (TUR)	6	Natalia Strzałka (POL)	2
Natalia Strzałka (POL)	13

=== Repechage ===
Bronze medal match
Alla Belinska (UKR)	5
Adéla Hanzlíčková (CZE)	2
Noémi Szabados (HUN)	4
Natalia Strzałka (POL)	7

== Final standing ==
Rank	Wrestler	UWW Points
1st place, gold medalist(s)	Irina Rîngaci (MDA)	10000
2nd place, silver medalist(s)	Pauline Lecarpentier (FRA)	8000
3rd place, bronze medalist(s)	Natalia Strzałka (POL)	6500
3rd place, bronze medalist(s)	Alla Belinska (UKR)	6500
5	Adéla Hanzlíčková (CZE)	5000
5	Noémi Szabados (HUN)	5000
7	Aslı Demir (TUR)	4400
8	Roxana Capezan (ROU)	4000
