= Yuliana Yaneva =

Bulgarian freestyle wrestler (born 1998)

Personal information
- Native name: Юлияна Василева Янева
- Full name: Yuliana Vasileva Yaneva
- Born: 2 August 1998 (age 27) Kukorevo, Yambol Province, Bulgaria

Sport
- Country: Bulgaria
- Sport: Amateur wrestling
- Weight class: 72 kg
- Event: Freestyle
Medal record
Women's freestyle wrestling
Representing Bulgaria
World Championships
Silver medal – second place	2025 Zagreb	68 kg
European Championships
Gold medal – first place	2023 Zagreb	68 kg
Silver medal – second place	2021 Warsaw	72 kg
Bronze medal – third place	2022 Budapest	72 kg
Bronze medal – third place	2024 Bucharest	72 kg
Individual World Cup
Gold medal – first place	2020 Belgrade	72 kg
Dan Kolov - Nikola Petrov Tournament
Gold medal – first place	2022 Tarnovo	72 kg
Gold medal – first place	2023 Sofia	68 kg
Gold medal – first place	2024 Sofia	68 kg
Grand Prix
Gold medal – first place	2026 Tirana	68 kg
Bronze medal – third place	2025 Budapest	68 kg
Junior World Championships
Silver medal – second place	2017 Tampere	63 kg

Yuliana Yaneva (Bulgarian: Юлияна Василева Янева) is a Bulgarian freestyle wrestler. She is a four-time medalist, including gold, at the European Wrestling Championships. She also won the gold medal in her event at the 2020 Individual Wrestling World Cup held in Belgrade, Serbia.

== Career ==
In 2019, Yaneva competed in the women's 65 kg event at the World Wrestling Championships held in Nur-Sultan, Kazakhstan. In 2020, she won the gold medal in the women's 72 kg event at the Individual Wrestling World Cup held in Belgrade, Serbia.

In March 2021, Yaneva competed at the European Qualification Tournament hoping to qualify for the 2020 Summer Olympics in Tokyo, Japan. She won her first match against Buse Tosun of Turkey but then lost her next match against Koumba Larroque of France which meant that she could no longer qualify for the Olympics at this tournament.

Yaneva won the silver medal in the women's 72 kg event at the 2021 European Wrestling Championships held in Warsaw, Poland.

In February 2022, she won the gold medal in the women's 72 kg event at the Dan Kolov & Nikola Petrov Tournament held in Veliko Tarnovo, Bulgaria. In April 2022, she won one of the bronze medals in the 72 kg event at the European Wrestling Championships held in Budapest, Hungary.

Yaneva won the gold medal in the women's 68 kg event at the 2023 Dan Kolov & Nikola Petrov Tournament held in Sofia, Bulgaria. She also won the gold medal in her event at the 2023 European Wrestling Championships held in Zagreb, Croatia. She defeated Alla Belinska of Ukraine in her gold medal match. In September 2023, she competed in the women's 68 kg event at the 2023 World Wrestling Championships held in Belgrade, Serbia.

Yaneva won one of the bronze medals in the 72 kg event at the 2024 European Wrestling Championships held in Bucharest, Romania. She competed at the 2024 World Wrestling Olympic Qualification Tournament held in Istanbul, Turkey and she earned a quota place for Bulgaria for the 2024 Summer Olympics in Paris, France. She competed in the women's 76 kg event at the Olympics.

== Achievements ==
Year	Tournament	Location	Result	Event
2021	European Championships	Warsaw, Poland	2nd	Freestyle 72 kg
2022	European Championships	Budapest, Hungary	3rd	Freestyle 72 kg
2023	European Championships	Zagreb, Croatia	1st	Freestyle 68 kg
2024	European Championships	Bucharest, Romania	3rd	Freestyle 72 kg
2025	World Championships	Zagreb, Croatia	2nd	Freestyle 68 kg
