= 2025 European Wrestling Championships – Women's freestyle 72 kg =

Wrestling competition

Women's freestyle 72 kg at the 2025 European Wrestling Championships
- Venue: X-Bionic Sphere
- Location: Bratislava, Slovakia
- Dates: 10-11 April
- Competitors: 11

Medalists
gold medal	Alla Belinska	Ukraine
silver medal	Nesrin Baş	Turkey
bronze medal	Alexandra Anghel	Romania
bronze medal	Pauline Lecarpentier	France

The women's freestyle 72 kg is a competition featured at the 2025 European Wrestling Championships, and was held in Bratislava, Slovakia on April 10 and 11.

== Results ==
Legend

- F — Won by fall

=== Main bracket ===
Round of 16
Elvira Ersson (SWE)	0
Nesrin Baş (TUR)	8^{F}
Kseniia Burakova (UWW)	10^{F}
Emilia Creciun (MDA)	0
Jennifer Rösler (GER)	2
Viktoryia Radzkova (UWW)	6

Quarterfinals
Alexandra Anghel (ROU)	1
Nesrin Baş (TUR)	2
Daniela Tkachuk (POL)	5
Zsuzsanna Molnár (SVK)	5
Alla Belinska (UKR)	10^{F}
Kseniia Burakova (UWW)	0
Viktoryia Radzkova (UWW)	3
Pauline Lecarpentier (FRA)	6

Semifinals
Nesrin Baş (TUR)	11
Daniela Tkachuk (POL)	3
Alla Belinska (UKR)	8
Pauline Lecarpentier (FRA)	2

Final
Nesrin Baş (TUR)	0
Alla Belinska (UKR)	5^{F}

=== Repechage ===
Repechage round 1
Elvira Ersson (SWE)	2
Alexandra Anghel (ROU)	8

Bronze medal match
Alexandra Anghel (ROU)	8
Daniela Tkachuk (POL)	3
Kseniia Burakova (UWW)	2
Pauline Lecarpentier (FRA)	3

== Final standing ==
Rank	Athlete
1st place, gold medalist(s)	Alla Belinska (UKR)
2nd place, silver medalist(s)	Nesrin Baş (TUR)
3rd place, bronze medalist(s)	Alexandra Anghel (ROU)
3rd place, bronze medalist(s)	Pauline Lecarpentier (FRA)
5	Daniela Tkachuk (POL)
5	Kseniia Burakova (UWW)
7	Viktoryia Radzkova (UWW)
8	Zsuzsanna Molnár (SVK)
9	Jennifer Rösler (GER)
10	Elvira Ersson (SWE)
11	Emilia Creciun (MDA)
