= 2022 U23 World Wrestling Championships – Women's freestyle 68 kg =

Wrestling competitions

Women's freestyle 68 kg at the 2022 U23 World Championships
- Venue: Pontevedra Municipal Sports Hall
- Dates: 19–20 October
- Competitors: 13 from 13 nations

Medalists
gold medal	Nesrin Baş	Turkey
silver medal	Naruha Matsuyuki	Japan
bronze medal	Irina Rîngaci	Moldova
bronze medal	Manola Skobelska	Ukraine

The women's freestyle 68 kilograms is a competition featured at the 2022 U23 World Wrestling Championships, and was held in Pontevedra, Spain on 19 and 20 October 2022. The qualification rounds were held on 19 October while medal matches were held on the 2nd day of the competition. A total of 13 wrestlers competed in this event, limited to athletes whose body weight was less than 68 kilograms.

This freestyle wrestling competition consists of a single-elimination tournament, with a repechage used to determine the winner of two bronze medals. The two finalists face off for gold and silver medals. Each wrestler who loses to one of the two finalists moves into the repechage, culminating in a pair of bronze medal matches featuring the semifinal losers each facing the remaining repechage opponent from their half of the bracket.

== Results ==
Legend

- F — Won by fall

=== Main bracket ===
Round of 16
Irina Rîngaci (MDA)	6
Nesrin Baş (TUR)	11
Albina Kairgeldinova (KAZ)	3
Sienna Ramirez (USA)	9
Katie Mulkay (CAN)	1
Zsuzsanna Molnár (SVK)	8
Naruha Matsuyuki (JPN)	9
Zuzanna Wólczyńska (POL)	0
Meiriele Hora (BRA)	6
Tindra Sjöberg (SWE)	12^{F}

Quarterfinals
Marta Ojeda (ESP)	0
Nesrin Baş (TUR)	10
Sienna Ramirez (USA)	4^{F}
Zsuzsanna Molnár (SVK)	0
Manola Skobelska (UKR)	1
Naruha Matsuyuki (JPN)	3
Tindra Sjöberg (SWE)	0
Noémi Szabados (HUN)	8^{F}

Semifinals
Nesrin Baş (TUR)	9
Sienna Ramirez (USA)	4
Naruha Matsuyuki (JPN)	6
Noémi Szabados (HUN)	5

Final
Nesrin Baş (TUR)	8
Naruha Matsuyuki (JPN)	0

=== Repechage ===
Repechage round
Irina Rîngaci (MDA)	10
Marta Ojeda (ESP)	0
Zuzanna Wólczyńska (POL)	0
Manola Skobelska (UKR)	12^{F}

Bronze medals
Irina Rîngaci (MDA)	6^{F}
Sienna Ramirez (USA)	1
Manola Skobelska (UKR)	6
Noémi Szabados (HUN)	2

== Final standing ==
Rank	Athlete
1st place, gold medalist(s)	Nesrin Baş (TUR)
2nd place, silver medalist(s)	Naruha Matsuyuki (JPN)
3rd place, bronze medalist(s)	Irina Rîngaci (MDA)
3rd place, bronze medalist(s)	Manola Skobelska (UKR)
5	Sienna Ramirez (USA)
5	Noémi Szabados (HUN)
7	Tindra Sjöberg (SWE)
8	Zsuzsanna Molnár (SVK)
9	Albina Kairgeldinova (KAZ)
10	Katie Mulkay (CAN)
11	Meiriele Hora (BRA)
12	Marta Ojeda (ESP)
13	Zuzanna Wólczyńska (POL)
