= Alla Belinska =

Ukrainian freestyle wrestler

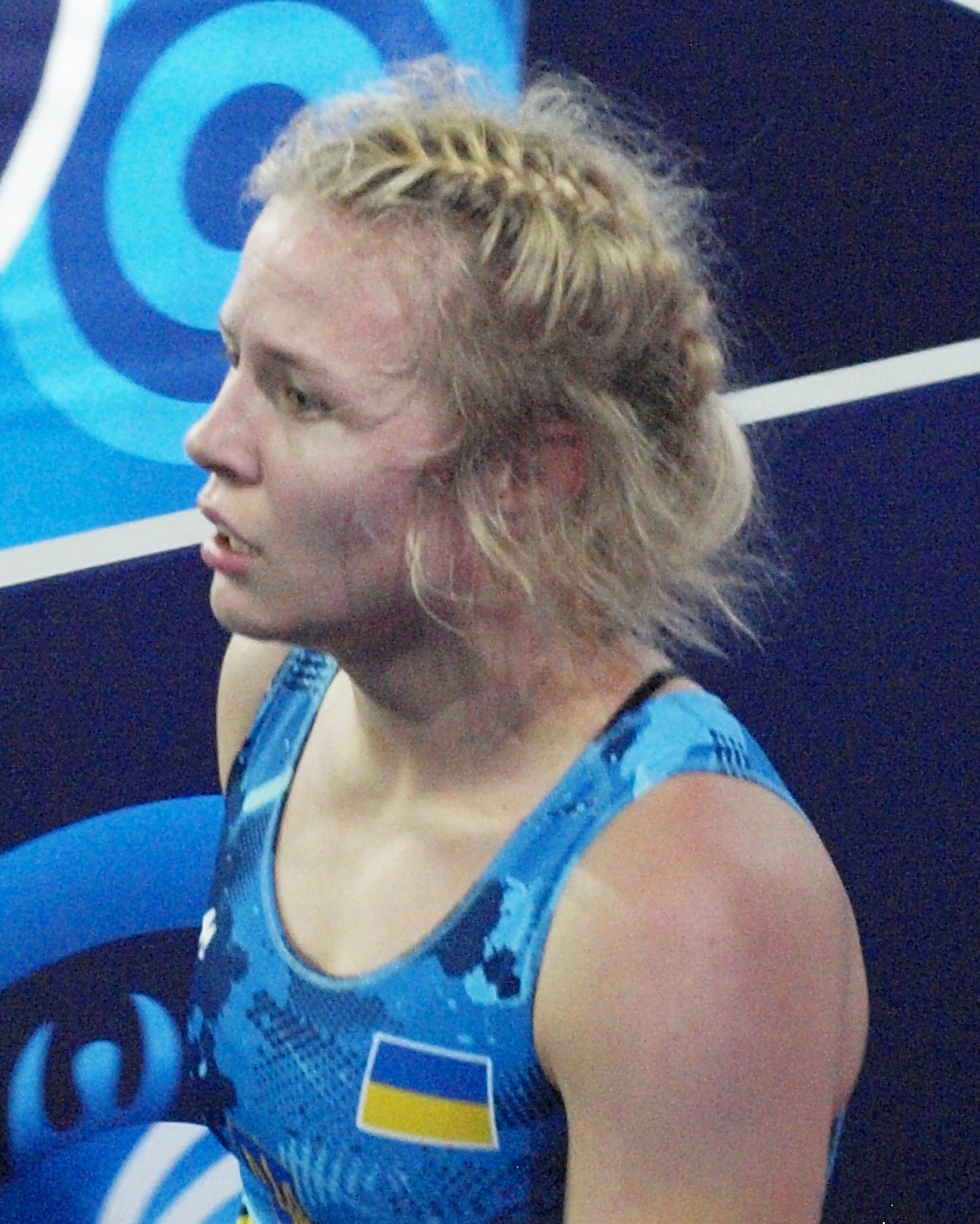
- Belinska at the 2021 World Wrestling Championships in Oslo, Norway

Personal information
- Native name: Алла Белінська
- Born: 8 October 1995 (age 31) Ternopil, Ukraine

Sport
- Country: Ukraine
- Sport: Amateur wrestling
- Event: Freestyle
Medal record
Women's freestyle wrestling
Representing Ukraine
World Championships
Gold medal – first place	2025 Zagreb	72 kg
European Championships
Gold medal – first place	2021 Warsaw	72 kg
Gold medal – first place	2025 Bratislava	72 kg
Silver medal – second place	2023 Zagreb	68 kg
Bronze medal – third place	2022 Budapest	68 kg
Individual World Cup
Bronze medal – third place	2020 Belgrade	72 kg
Military World Games
Bronze medal – third place	2019 Wuhan	76 kg
Grand Prix
Silver medal – second place	2025 Tirana	72 kg
European U23 Championship
Bronze medal – third place	2018 Istanbul	68 kg

Alla Belinska (Ukrainian: Алла Белінська, born 8 October 1995) is a Ukrainian freestyle wrestler. She won the gold medal in the 72 kg event at the 2025 World Wrestling Championships held in Zagreb, Croatia. She is a four-time medalist, including two gold medals, at the European Wrestling Championships. She represented Ukraine at the 2020 Summer Olympics in Tokyo, Japan.

== Career ==
In one of her first senior-level competitions, Belinska competed at the World Olympic Qualification Tournament held in Ulaanbaatar, Mongolia hoping to qualify for the 2016 Summer Olympics in Rio de Janeiro, Brazil. Belinska was no longer able to qualify after losing her first match against María Acosta of Venezuela. In 2017, she lost her bronze medal match at the 2017 European U23 Wrestling Championships held in Szombathely, Hungary. In that same year, she was eliminated in her first match in the women's 69 kg event at the 2017 World Wrestling Championships held in Paris, France.

In 2018, Belinska won the bronze medal in the women's 68 kg event at the European U23 Wrestling Championship held in Istanbul, Turkey. She also competed in the women's 72 kg event at the World Wrestling Championships held in Budapest, Hungary.

In 2019, Belinska represented Ukraine in the women's 76 kg event at the European Games in Minsk, Belarus. She was eliminated in her second match by eventual bronze medalist Epp Mäe of Estonia. A few months later, she competed in the women's 76 kg event at the World Wrestling Championships held in Nur-Sultan, Kazakhstan. She also represented Ukraine at the Military World Games held in Wuhan, China and she won one of the bronze medals in the 76 kg event. In the same year, she also competed in the women's freestyle competition of the 2019 Wrestling World Cup.

In 2020, Belinska won one of the bronze medals in the women's 72 kg event at the Individual Wrestling World Cup held in Belgrade, Serbia. In March 2021, she competed at the European Qualification Tournament in Budapest, Hungary hoping to qualify for the 2020 Summer Olympics in Tokyo, Japan. She did not qualify as she lost her match in the quarterfinals against Vasilisa Marzaliuk of Belarus. A month later, Belinska won the gold medal in the 72 kg event at the European Wrestling Championships held in Warsaw, Poland. She defeated Yuliana Yaneva of Bulgaria in the final. In May 2021, Belinska qualified at the World Olympic Qualification Tournament to represent Ukraine at the 2020 Summer Olympics. A month later, she won the gold medal in her event at the 2021 Poland Open held in Warsaw, Poland.

Belinska competed in the women's 76 kg event at the 2020 Summer Olympics held in Tokyo, Japan. She was eliminated in her first match by eventual bronze medalist Zhou Qian of China. Two months after the Olympics, she was eliminated in her first match in the women's 72 kg event at the 2021 World Wrestling Championships held in Oslo, Norway. Her opponent Anna Schell of Germany went on to win one of the bronze medals.

Belinska won one of the bronze medals in the women's 68 kg event at the 2022 European Wrestling Championships held in Budapest, Hungary. A few months later, she won the gold medal in her event at the Matteo Pellicone Ranking Series 2022 held in Rome, Italy. She competed in the 68 kg event at the 2022 World Wrestling Championships held in Belgrade, Serbia.

Belinska won one of the bronze medals in her event at the 2023 Ibrahim Moustafa Tournament held in Alexandria, Egypt. She won the silver medal in the women's 68 kg event at the 2023 European Wrestling Championships held in Zagreb, Croatia.

In 2025, Belinska won the gold medal in the 72 kg event at the European Wrestling Championships held in Bratislava, Slovakia.

== Achievements ==
Year	Tournament	Location	Result	Event
2019	Military World Games	Wuhan, China	3rd	Freestyle 76 kg
2021	European Championships	Warsaw, Poland	1st	Freestyle 72 kg
2022	European Championships	Budapest, Hungary	3rd	Freestyle 68 kg
2023	European Championships	Zagreb, Croatia	2nd	Freestyle 68 kg
2025	European Championships	Bratislava, Slovakia	1st	Freestyle 72 kg
2025	World Championships	Zagreb, Croatia	1st	Freestyle 72 kg
