= 2024 European Wrestling Championships – Women's freestyle 72 kg =

Wrestling competition

Women's freestyle 72 kg at the 2024 European Wrestling Championships
- Venue: Polyvalent Hall
- Location: Bucharest, Romania
- Dates: 15-16 February
- Competitors: 12

Medalists
gold medal	Nesrin Baş	Turkey
silver medal	Alexandra Anghel	Romania
bronze medal	Wiktoria Chołuj	Poland
bronze medal	Yuliana Yaneva	Bulgaria

The women's freestyle 72 kg is a competition featured at the 2024 European Wrestling Championships, and held in Bucharest, Romania on February 15 and 16.

== Results ==
Legend

- F — Won by fall

=== Main bracket ===
Round of 16
Olesia Bezuglova (AIN)	8
Wiktoria Chołuj (POL)	9
Viktoryia Radzkova (AIN)	3
Eleni Chrysikaki (GRE)	0
Alexandra Anghel (ROU)	2
Yuliana Yaneva (BUL)	1
Lorena Lera (ESP)	0
Anastasiya Alpyeyeva (UKR)	10

Quarterfinals
Kendra Dacher (FRA)	4
Wiktoria Chołuj (POL)	6
Viktoryia Radzkova (AIN)	0
Nesrin Baş (TUR)	7
Ilana Kratysh (ISR)	0
Alexandra Anghel (ROU)	7^{F}
Anastasiya Alpyeyeva (UKR)	11^{F}
Fanni Nađ (SRB)	0

Semifinals
Wiktoria Chołuj (POL)	1
Nesrin Baş (TUR)	2
Alexandra Anghel (ROU)	6^{F}
Anastasiya Alpyeyeva (UKR)	5

Final
Nesrin Baş (TUR)	5
Alexandra Anghel (ROU)	1

=== Repechage ===
Repechage round 1
Yuliana Yaneva (BUL)	10
Ilana Kratysh (ISR)	0

Bronze medal match
Viktoryia Radzkova (AIN)	2
Wiktoria Chołuj (POL)	6
Yuliana Yaneva (BUL)	WO
Anastasiya Alpyeyeva (UKR)

== Final standing ==
Rank	Athlete
1st place, gold medalist(s)	Nesrin Baş (TUR)
2nd place, silver medalist(s)	Alexandra Anghel (ROU)
3rd place, bronze medalist(s)	Wiktoria Chołuj (POL)
3rd place, bronze medalist(s)	Yuliana Yaneva (BUL)
5	Viktoryia Radzkova (AIN)
5	Anastasiya Alpyeyeva (UKR)
7	Olesia Bezuglova (AIN)
8	Kendra Dacher (FRA)
9	Eleni Chrysikaki (GRE)
10	Lorena Lera (ESP)
11	Fanni Nađ (SRB)
12	Ilana Kratysh (ISR)
