= 2023 U23 World Wrestling Championships – Women's freestyle 68 kg =

Wrestling competitions

Women's freestyle 68 kg at the 2023 U23 World Championships
- Venue: Tirana Olympic Park
- Dates: 25–26 October
- Competitors: 14 from 11 nations

Medalists
gold medal	Nesrin Baş	Turkey
silver medal	Alina Shauchuk	Authorised Neutral Athletes
bronze medal	Manola Skobelska	Ukraine
bronze medal	Tindra Sjöberg	Sweden

The women's freestyle 68 kilograms is a competition featured at the 2023 U23 World Wrestling Championships, and will held in Tirana, Albania on 25 and 26 October 2023.

This freestyle wrestling competition consists of a single-elimination tournament, with a repechage used to determine the winner of two bronze medals. The two finalists face off for gold and silver medals. Each wrestler who loses to one of the two finalists moves into the repechage, culminating in a pair of bronze medal matches featuring the semifinal losers each facing the remaining repechage opponent from their half of the bracket.

== Results ==
Legend

- F — Won by fall

=== Main bracket ===
Round of 16
Nesrin Baş (TUR)	1
Manola Skobelska (UKR)	1
Katerina Lange (USA)	1
Vusala Parfianovich (ANA)	7
Luciana Beda (MDA)	2
Paulina Danisz (POL)	0
Vanessa Keefe (CAN)	7
Varsha Gadhwal (UWW)	5
Gulnura Tashtanbekova (KGZ)	12
Beibit Seidualy (KAZ)	1
Tindra Sjöberg (SWE)	3
Noémi Szabados (HUN)	2

Quarterfinals
Nour Jeljeli (TUN)	0
Nesrin Baş (TUR)	10^{F}
Vusala Parfianovich (ANA)	4
Luciana Beda (MDA)	1
Vanessa Keefe (CAN)	4^{F}
Gulnura Tashtanbekova (KGZ)	2
Tindra Sjöberg (SWE)	1
Alina Shauchuk (ANA)	6

Semifinals
Nesrin Baş (TUR)	3
Vusala Parfianovich (ANA)	1
Vanessa Keefe (CAN)	0
Alina Shauchuk (ANA)	10

Final
Nesrin Baş (TUR)	2
Alina Shauchuk (ANA)	1

=== Repechage ===
Repechage round 1
Manola Skobelska (UKR)	4
Nour Jeljeli (TUN)	1

Bronze medals
Manola Skobelska (UKR)	5
Vusala Parfianovich (ANA)	3
Tindra Sjöberg (SWE)	11
Vanessa Keefe (CAN)	0
