= Wrestling at the 2022 Mediterranean Games – Women's freestyle 68 kg =

Wrestling competitions

Women's Freestyle 68 kg at the 2022 Mediterranean Games
- Venue: EMEC Hall
- Date: 28–29 June
- Competitors: 6 from 6 nations

Medalists
gold medal	Pauline Lecarpentier	France
silver medal	Buse Tosun	Turkey
bronze medal	Dalma Caneva	Italy

The women's freestyle 68 kg competition of the wrestling events at the 2022 Mediterranean Games in Oran, Algeria, was held from 28 June to 29 June at the EMEC Hall.

== Results ==
28 June

=== Elimination groups ===
==== Group A ====
Pos	Athlete	Pld	W	L	CP	TP
1	Dalma Caneva (ITA)	2	1	1	5	17
2	Khadija Jlassi (TUN)	2	1	1	4	11
3	Nerea Pampín (ESP)	2	1	1	3	7

Source: Oran 2022

	Score		CP
Khadija Jlassi (TUN)	4–7	Nerea Pampín (ESP)	1–3 VPO1
Dalma Caneva (ITA)	6–7	Khadija Jlassi (TUN)	1–3 VPO1
Nerea Pampín (ESP)	0–11	Dalma Caneva (ITA)	0–4 VSU

==== Group B ====
Pos	Athlete	Pld	W	L	CP	TP
1	Buse Tosun (TUR)	2	2	0	7	17
2	Pauline Lecarpentier (FRA)	2	1	1	6	18
3	Thelleli Merzouk (ALG)	2	0	2	0	0

Source: Oran 2022

	Score		CP
Pauline Lecarpentier (FRA)	6–7	Buse Tosun (TUR)	1–3 VPO1
Thelleli Merzouk (ALG)	0–12 Fall	Pauline Lecarpentier (FRA)	0–5 VFA
Buse Tosun (TUR)	10–0	Thelleli Merzouk (ALG)	4–0 VSU

Semifinals
Dalma Caneva (ITA)	1
Pauline Lecarpentier (FRA)	2
Khadija Jlassi (TUN)	0
Buse Tosun (TUR)	9^{F}

Final
Pauline Lecarpentier (FRA)	4
Buse Tosun (TUR)	3
Bronze medal
Dalma Caneva (ITA)	5^{F}
Khadija Jlassi (TUN)	0
