= 2021 European Wrestling Championships – Women's freestyle 72 kg =

Wrestling competition

The women's freestyle 72 kg is a competition featured at the 2021 European Wrestling Championships, and was held in Warsaw, Poland on April 22 and April 23.

== Medalists ==
| Gold | Alla Belinska; Ukraine |
| Silver | Yuliana Yaneva; Bulgaria |
| Bronze | Evgenia Zakharchenko; Russia |
| Bronze | Dalma Caneva; Italy |

== Results ==
Legend

- F — Won by fall

| Quarterfinals | | Semifinals | | Final |
| Merve Pul (TUR) | 0 |
| Alla Belinska (UKR) | 4^{F} | Alla Belinska (UKR) | 4^{F} |
| Cătălina Axente (ROU) | 2 | Evgenia Zakharchenko (RUS) | 1 |
| Evgenia Zakharchenko (RUS) | 5 | | | Alla Belinska (UKR) | 6 |
| Agnieszka Wieszczek (POL) | 1 | | | Yuliana Yaneva (BUL) | 3 |
| Dalma Caneva (ITA) | 2 | Dalma Caneva (ITA) | 1 |
| Maria Selmaier (GER) | 0 | Yuliana Yaneva (BUL) | 3 |
| Yuliana Yaneva (BUL) | 6 |

Bronze medal match
Merve Pul (TUR) | 0
Evgenia Zakharchenko (RUS) | 11
Maria Selmaier (GER) | 2
Dalma Caneva (ITA) | 3

== Final standing ==
| Rank | Athlete |
|---|---|
| 1st place, gold medalist(s) | Alla Belinska (UKR) |
| 2nd place, silver medalist(s) | Yuliana Yaneva (BUL) |
| 3rd place, bronze medalist(s) | Evgenia Zakharchenko (RUS) |
| 3rd place, bronze medalist(s) | Dalma Caneva (ITA) |
| 5 | Merve Pul (TUR) |
| 5 | Maria Selmaier (GER) |
| 7 | Cătălina Axente (ROU) |
| 8 | Agnieszka Wieszczek (POL) |
