= 2022 European Juniors Wrestling Championships – Men's freestyle =

The Men's Freestyle competitions at the 2022 European Juniors Wrestling Championships were held in Rome, Italy between 27 June to 3 July 2022.

== Men's freestyle 57 kg ==
Legend

- F — Won by fall

Main bracket

Round of 16
Seyfulla Itaev (FRA)	4
Simone Piroddu (ITA)	4
Karamjeet Holstein (GER)	1
Ivaylo Tisov (BUL)	12
Ahmet Karavuş (TUR)	10
Nureddin Novruzov (AZE)	10
Balázs Rácz (HUN)	0
Dmitri Carastoianov (MDA)	10
Harvey Ridings (GBR)	0
Harutyun Hovhannisyan (ARM)	10
Artiomij Boguslavskij (LTU)	5
Rafał Szewc (POL)	10^{F}
Luka Gvinjilia (GEO)	4^{F}
Thomas Fischer (SUI)	0

Quarterfinals
Vladislav Abramov (UKR)	0
Simone Piroddu (ITA)	5
Ivaylo Tisov (BUL)	9
Ahmet Karavuş (TUR)	16
Dmitri Carastoianov (MDA)	0
Harutyun Hovhannisyan (ARM)	10
Rafał Szewc (POL)	0
Luka Gvinjilia (GEO)	10

Semifinals
Simone Piroddu (ITA)	8
Ahmet Karavuş (TUR)	3
Harutyun Hovhannisyan (ARM)	10
Luka Gvinjilia (GEO)	0

Final
Simone Piroddu (ITA)	9
Harutyun Hovhannisyan (ARM)	0

Repechage round
Seyfulla Itaev (FRA)	2
Vladislav Abramov (UKR)	4
Harvey Ridings (GBR)	4
Dmitri Carastoianov (MDA)	2^{F}

Bronze medals
Vladislav Abramov (UKR)	5
Ahmet Karavuş (TUR)	11
Dmitri Carastoianov (MDA)	0
Luka Gvinjilia (GEO)	10

== Men's freestyle 61 kg ==
Legend

- F — Won by fall

Final

Final
Khamzat Arsamerzouev (FRA)	3
Daviti Abdaladze (GEO)	4

Top half

Round of 32
Ilyas Abdurashidov (BEL)	0
Khamzat Arsamerzouev (FRA)	10
Fabian Niedźwiedzki (POL)	4
Endrio Avdyli (ALB)	2

Round of 16
Abdullah Toprak (TUR)	10
Karolis Grigelaitis (LTU)	0
Khamzat Arsamerzouev (FRA)	10
Besir Alili (MKD)	2
Marcel Wagin (GER)	8^{F}
Fabian Niedźwiedzki (POL)	0
Fatlum Braka (KOS)	0
Ramik Heybetov (AZE)	13

Quarterfinals
Abdullah Toprak (TUR)	8
Khamzat Arsamerzouev (FRA)	13
Marcel Wagin (GER)	2
Ramik Heybetov (AZE)	4

Semifinals
Khamzat Arsamerzouev (FRA)	3
Ramik Heybetov (AZE)	3

Bottom half

Round of 32
Dimitris Oflidis (GRE)	2
Akseli Erkkola (FIN)	12
Zoltán Mizsei (HUN)	4
Daniel Sandu (ROU)	9

Round of 16
Hyusein Ibrahim (BUL)	0
Daviti Abdaladze (GEO)	10
Akseli Erkkola (FIN)	0
Hayk Abrahamyan (ARM)	10
Vasile Marcu (MDA)	1
Daniel Sandu (ROU)	2
Danny Lubrano (ITA)	9
Yurii Vovk (UKR)	14

Quarterfinals
Daviti Abdaladze (GEO)	3
Hayk Abrahamyan (ARM)	3
Daniel Sandu (ROU)	11
Yurii Vovk (UKR)	10

Semifinals
Daviti Abdaladze (GEO)	7
Daniel Sandu (ROU)	0

Repechage round 1
Ilyas Abdurashidov (BEL)	0
Besir Alili (MKD)	2^{F}

Repechage round 2
Besir Alili (MKD)	2
Abdullah Toprak (TUR)	11^{F}
Hyusein Ibrahim (BUL)	0
Hayk Abrahamyan (ARM)	12

Bronze medal match
Abdullah Toprak (TUR)	0
Ramik Heybetov (AZE)	1
Hayk Abrahamyan (ARM)	8
Daniel Sandu (ROU)	3

== Men's freestyle 65 kg ==
Legend

- F — Won by fall

Main bracket

Round of 16
Constantin Chirilov (MDA)	14
Muhamed Bektemirov (AUT)	12
Felipe Ferrusola (ESP)	0
Egzon Xhoni (KOS)	4^{F}
Bartosz Sołtys (POL)	14
Muhamed Feruki (MKD)	3
Tigran Ghazaryan (ARM)	1
Mykyta Zubal (UKR)	11
Tomaš Csörgő (SVK)	0
Mehmet Çelik (TUR)	10
Julien Zinser (GER)	13
Paolo Pio Lumia (ITA)	2
Luka Janezashvili (GEO)	2
Ayub Musaev (BEL)	7
Ruhan Rasim (BUL)	3
Abulfaz Nasirov (AZE)	7

Quarterfinals
Constantin Chirilov (MDA)	10
Egzon Xhoni (KOS)	0
Bartosz Sołtys (POL)	0
Mykyta Zubal (UKR)	10
Mehmet Çelik (TUR)	8
Julien Zinser (GER)	4
Ayub Musaev (BEL)	4
Abulfaz Nasirov (AZE)	1

Semifinals
Constantin Chirilov (MDA)	8
Mykyta Zubal (UKR)	16
Mehmet Çelik (TUR)	1
Ayub Musaev (BEL)	7

Final
Mykyta Zubal (UKR)	5
Ayub Musaev (BEL)	4

Repechage round
Tigran Ghazaryan (ARM)	7
Bartosz Sołtys (POL)	5
Luka Janezashvili (GEO)	20
Abulfaz Nasirov (AZE)	10

Bronze medals
Tigran Ghazaryan (ARM)	5
Constantin Chirilov (MDA)	6
Luka Janezashvili (GEO)	11
Mehmet Çelik (TUR)	2

== Men's freestyle 70 kg ==
Legend

- F — Won by fall
- DSQ — Disqualified

Final

Final
~~Sabir Jafarov (AZE)~~	2^{DSQ}
Hayk Papikyan (ARM)	3

Top half

Round of 32
Davit Kutchuashvili (GEO)	11
Arjan Danaj (ALB)	0
Csíki Ervin (ROU)	8
Georgios Raptopoulos (GRE)	5
Muhammad Abdurachmanov (BEL)	0
~~Sabir Jafarov (AZE)~~	5

Round of 16
Raul Caso (ITA)	5
Narek Pohosian (UKR)	2
Davit Kutchuashvili (GEO)	4
Kevin Makota Ström (SWE)	2
Benedikt Huber (AUT)	10^{F}
Csíki Ervin (ROU)	0
~~Sabir Jafarov (AZE)~~	5
Adrian Barnowski (GER)	4

Quarterfinals
Raul Caso (ITA)	12
Davit Kutchuashvili (GEO)	2
Benedikt Huber (AUT)	0
~~Sabir Jafarov (AZE)~~	11

Semifinals
Raul Caso (ITA)	0
~~Sabir Jafarov (AZE)~~	3

Bottom half

Round of 32
Robin Mikécz (SVK)	10
Akseli Virtanen (FIN)	8
Marcell Nagy (HUN)	15^{F}
Mevlüt Özdemir (TUR)	8
Ivan Stoyanov (BUL)	6
Pavel Andrușca (MDA)	10

Round of 16
Ramon Geršak-Pérez (ESP)	8
Robin Mikécz (SVK)	3
Marcell Nagy (HUN)	14
Liran Benoguev (ISR)	3
Mateusz Luszczynski (POL)	2
Pavel Andrușca (MDA)	4^{F}
Viljams Lutkevics (LAT)	0
Hayk Papikyan (ARM)	10

Quarterfinals
Ramon Geršak-Pérez (ESP)	2
Marcell Nagy (HUN)	13
Pavel Andrușca (MDA)	0
Hayk Papikyan (ARM)	10^{F}

Semifinals
Marcell Nagy (HUN)	2
Hayk Papikyan (ARM)	12

Repechage round 1
Muhammad Abdurachmanov (BEL)	10
Adrian Barnowski (GER)	5

Repechage round 2
Muhammad Abdurachmanov (BEL)	10
Benedikt Huber (AUT)	2
Viljams Lutkevics (LAT)	4
Pavel Andrușca (MDA)	4

Bronze medal match
Muhammad Abdurachmanov (BEL)	3
Raul Caso (ITA)	2
Pavel Andrușca (MDA)	6
Marcell Nagy (HUN)	0

== Men's freestyle 74 kg ==
Legend

- F — Won by fall

Final

Final
Dzhabrail Gadzhiev (AZE)	11
Gheorghe Cara (MDA)	1

Top half

Round of 32
Georgios Terzidis (GRE)	0
Dzhabrail Gadzhiev (AZE)	10
Stas David Wolf (GER)	2
Muhammed Ozmuş (TUR)	4
Menua Yaribekyan (ARM)	10
Alexander Seiwald (AUT)	0

Round of 16
Gaidars Mamedovs (LAT)	0
Krisztian Biro (ROU)	10
Dzhabrail Gadzhiev (AZE)	11
Luca Finizio (ITA)	0
Miko Elkala (FIN)	0
Muhammed Ozmuş (TUR)	11
Menua Yaribekyan (ARM)	12
Petr Grygerek (CZE)	1

Quarterfinals
Krisztian Biro (ROU)	2
Dzhabrail Gadzhiev (AZE)	6
Muhammed Ozmuş (TUR)	4
Menua Yaribekyan (ARM)	1

Semifinals
Dzhabrail Gadzhiev (AZE)	7
Muhammed Ozmuş (TUR)	0

Bottom half

Round of 32
Vartan Oganissian (ISR)	0
Gheorghe Cara (MDA)	8^{F}
Umar Mavlaev (SUI)	2^{F}
Bálint Nemes (HUN)	1

Round of 16
Vadym Tsurkan (UKR)	10
Dyanko Dyankov (BUL)	0
Gheorghe Cara (MDA)	2^{F}
Marek Bazsó (SVK)	0
Dominik Mytkowski (POL)	2
Umar Mavlaev (SUI)	12
Luka Kukhianidze (GEO)	12
Magamed Deliev (FRA)	2

Quarterfinals
Vadym Tsurkan (UKR)	6
Gheorghe Cara (MDA)	7
Umar Mavlaev (SUI)	1
Luka Kukhianidze (GEO)	2

Semifinals
Gheorghe Cara (MDA)	8
Luka Kukhianidze (GEO)	8

Repechage round 1
Georgios Terzidis (GRE)	5
Luca Finizio (ITA)	11
Vartan Oganissian (ISR)	4
Marek Bazsó (SVK)	3

Repechage round 2
Luca Finizio (ITA)	0
Krisztian Biro (ROU)	10
Vartan Oganissian (ISR)	0
Vadym Tsurkan (UKR)	10

Bronze medal match
Krisztian Biro (ROU)	0
Muhammed Ozmuş (TUR)	11
Vadym Tsurkan (UKR)	10
Luka Kukhianidze (GEO)	2

== Men's freestyle 79 kg ==
Legend

- F — Won by fall

Final
Otari Adeishvili (GEO)	4
Mushegh Mkrtchyan (ARM)	9

Top half

Round of 32
Vilhelm Larsson (SWE)	3
Patryk Kostrzewski (POL)	8

Round of 16
Eugeniu Mihalcean (MDA)	6
Alim Miesuvietov (UKR)	7
Patryk Kostrzewski (POL)	1
Radomir Stoyanov (BUL)	12
Otari Adeishvili (GEO)	9
Alan Golmohammadi (GER)	0
Gabriel Iglesias (ESP)	10
Lukas Lins (AUT)	0

Quarterfinals
Alim Miesuvietov (UKR)	5
Radomir Stoyanov (BUL)	6
Otari Adeishvili (GEO)	8
Gabriel Iglesias (ESP)	6

Semifinals
Radomir Stoyanov (BUL)	2
Otari Adeishvili (GEO)	5

Bottom half

Round of 32
Kimi Käppeli (SUI)	4
Márk Jochim (HUN)	4
Andrija Ivanović (SRB)	14
Paulius Leščauskas (LTU)	4

Round of 16
Daniels Bendiks (LAT)	0
Sabuhi Amiraslanov (AZE)	10
Kimi Käppeli (SUI)	0
Hakan Satılmış (TUR)	4
Raffaele Matrullo (ITA)	2
Andrija Ivanović (SRB)	1
Mushegh Mkrtchyan (ARM)	10
Marian Subțirică (ROU)	0

Quarterfinals
Sabuhi Amiraslanov (AZE)	5
Hakan Satılmış (TUR)	2
Raffaele Matrullo (ITA)	0
Mushegh Mkrtchyan (ARM)	10

Semifinals
Sabuhi Amiraslanov (AZE)	1
Mushegh Mkrtchyan (ARM)	3

Repechage round 2
Alan Golmohammadi (GER)	1
Gabriel Iglesias (ESP)	4
Marian Subțirică (ROU)	11
Raffaele Matrullo (ITA)	1

Bronze medals
Gabriel Iglesias (ESP)	0
Radomir Stoyanov (BUL)	4
Marian Subțirică (ROU)	0
Sabuhi Amiraslanov (AZE)	11

== Men's freestyle 86 kg ==
Legend

- F — Won by fall

Main bracket

Round of 16
Daniel Fischer (GER)	1
Farid Jabbarov (AZE)	2
Daviti Koguashvili (GEO)	12
Nándor Hajduch (HUN)	0
Artur Urtaev (ISR)	0
Nazar Dod (UKR)	11
Lilian Balan (MDA)	12
Nikolay Binkov (BUL)	2
Rakhim Magamadov (FRA)	10
Matěj Mlčoch (CZE)	0
Kevin Mikécz (SVK)	2
Angelos Kouklaris (GRE)	12
Damian Korbus (POL)	1
Knyaz Iboyan (ARM)	8
Fatih Altunbaş (TUR)	13
Gabriele Niccolini (ITA)	2

Quarterfinals
Farid Jabbarov (AZE)	3
Daviti Koguashvili (GEO)	5
Nazar Dod (UKR)	4^{F}
Lilian Balan (MDA)	3
Rakhim Magamadov (FRA)	12
Angelos Kouklaris (GRE)	1
Knyaz Iboyan (ARM)	0
Fatih Altunbaş (TUR)	10

Semifinals
Daviti Koguashvili (GEO)	13
Nazar Dod (UKR)	2
Rakhim Magamadov (FRA)	10
Fatih Altunbaş (TUR)	0

Final
Daviti Koguashvili (GEO)	3
Rakhim Magamadov (FRA)	9

Repechage round
Nándor Hajduch (HUN)	0
Farid Jabbarov (AZE)	10
Matěj Mlčoch (CZE)	2
Angelos Kouklaris (GRE)	13

Bronze medals
Farid Jabbarov (AZE)	3
Nazar Dod (UKR)	5
Angelos Kouklaris (GRE)	0
Fatih Altunbaş (TUR)	10

== Men's freestyle 92 kg ==
Legend

- F — Won by fall

Final

Final
Andro Margishvili (GEO)	1
Ion Demian (MDA)	11

Top half

Round of 32
Patrik Varteva (FIN)	0
Andro Margishvili (GEO)	11

Round of 16
Sergey Sargsyan (ARM)	15
Atilla Kaan Aydın (TUR)	4
Andro Margishvili (GEO)	15
Adam Jakšík (SVK)	4
Suray Rufad (BUL)	2
Gkivi Bliatze (GRE)	13
Abduljalil Shabanov (AZE)	0
Denys Sahaliuk (UKR)	4

Quarterfinals
Sergey Sargsyan (ARM)	2
Andro Margishvili (GEO)	12
Gkivi Bliatze (GRE)	3
Denys Sahaliuk (UKR)	4

Semifinals
Andro Margishvili (GEO)	9
Denys Sahaliuk (UKR)	8

Bottom half

Round of 32

Round of 16
Nikita Goubarets (ISR)	0
Adlan Viskhanov (FRA)	11
Kacper Śledź (POL)	1
Redjep Hajdari (MKD)	7
Ion Demian (MDA)	9
Krisztián Angyal (HUN)	2
Kiril Kildau (GER)	10
Mattia Nasello (ITA)	0

Quarterfinals
Adlan Viskhanov (FRA)	4
Redjep Hajdari (MKD)	0
Ion Demian (MDA)	14
Kiril Kildau (GER)	8

Semifinals
Adlan Viskhanov (FRA)	3
Ion Demian (MDA)	4

Repechage round 1
Patrik Varteva (FIN)	8
Adam Jaksik (SVK)	18

Repechage round 2
Adam Jaksik (SVK)	0
Sergey Sargsyan (ARM)	10
Krisztián Angyal (HUN)	8
Kiril Kildau (GER)	13

Bronze medal match
Sergey Sargsyan (ARM)	1
Denys Sahaliuk (UKR)	6
Kiril Kildau (GER)	5
Adlan Viskhanov (FRA)	9

== Men's freestyle 97 kg ==
Legend

- D — Disqualified
- F — Won by fall

Main bracket

Round of 16
Florin Tripon (ROU)	1
Ivan Prymachenko (UKR)	5
Vilius Mikalauskas (LTU)	9^{F}
Hanan Haimov (ISR)	0
Aldo De Vita (ITA)	2
Marius Uja (MDA)	12
Sali Saliev (BUL)	6
Khachatur Khachatryan (ARM)	3
Varis Mehdizade (AZE)	7
Yusuf Şenyiğit (GER)	4

Quarterfinals
Charalampos Aftoforidis (GRE)	2
Ivan Prymachenko (UKR)	8^{F}
Vilius Mikalauskas (LTU)	4
Marius Uja (MDA)	7
Luka Khutchua (GEO)	11
Sali Saliev (BUL)	0
Varis Mehdizade (AZE)	0
Mücahit Çelik (TUR)	10

Semifinals
Ivan Prymachenko (UKR)	3
Marius Uja (MDA)	0
Luka Khutchua (GEO)	6
Mücahit Çelik (TUR)	17

Final
Ivan Prymachenko (UKR)	2
Mücahit Çelik (TUR)	12

Repechage round
Florin Tripon (ROU)	6
Charalampos Aftoforidis (GRE)	4

Bronze medals
Florin Tripon (ROU)	6
~~Marius Uja (MDA)~~^{DSQ}	0
Varis Mehdizade (AZE)	5
Luka Khutchua (GEO)	13

== Men's freestyle 125 kg ==
Legend

- F — Won by fall

Main bracket

Round of 16
Nicolae Stratulat (MDA)	0
Georgi Ivanov (BUL)	11

Quarterfinals
Aslan Abakarov (AZE)	4
Georgi Ivanov (BUL)	7
Volodymyr Diachenko (UKR)	1
Merab Suleimanashvili (GEO)	12
Lyova Gevorgyan (ARM)	10
Jakub Czerczak (POL)	0
Adil Mısırcı (TUR)	4
Milán Gellén (HUN)	1

Semifinals
Georgi Ivanov (BUL)	3
Merab Suleimanashvili (GEO)	13
Lyova Gevorgyan (ARM)	5
Adil Mısırcı (TUR)	2

Final
Merab Suleimanashvili (GEO)	2
Lyova Gevorgyan (ARM)	13

Bronze medal match
Volodymyr Diachenko (UKR)	0
Georgi Ivanov (BUL)	4^{F}
Jakub Czerczak (POL)	0
Adil Mısırcı (TUR)	10

== See also ==
- 2022 European Juniors Wrestling Championships – Men's Greco-Roman
- 2022 European Juniors Wrestling Championships – Women's freestyle
