= 2022 European Juniors Wrestling Championships – Men's Greco-Roman =

The men's Greco-Roman competitions at the 2022 European Juniors Wrestling Championships were held in Rome, Italy, between 27 June and 3 July 2022.

== Men's Greco-Roman 55 kg ==
Legend

- F — Won by fall
- WO — Won by walkover

Main bracket

Round of 16
Aywil Fouache (FRA)	0
Nihad Guluzade (AZE)	9
Georgios Scarpello (GER)	5
Jakovs Jakovļevs (LAT)	1
Andrea Martino (ITA)	1
Luka Javakhadze (GEO)	9
Denis Mihai (ROU)	4
Milan Németh (HUN)	0
Emre Mutlu (TUR)	8
Vilius Adomavičius (LTU)	0
Ilias Zairakis (GRE)	0
Paolo Milkov (BUL)	9
Homer Arakelyan (ARM)	8
Szabolcs Losonc (SRB)	0

Quarterfinals
Mykola Havrychkin (UKR)	1
Nihad Guluzade (AZE)	3
Georgios Scarpello (GER)	5
Luka Javakhadze (GEO)	1
Denis Mihai (ROU)	3
Emre Mutlu (TUR)	1
Paolo Milkov (BUL)	1
Homer Arakelyan (ARM)	10

Semifinals
Nihad Guluzade (AZE)	5
Georgios Scarpello (GER)	1
Denis Mihai (ROU)	8
Homer Arakelyan (ARM)	0

Final
Nihad Guluzade (AZE)	10
Denis Mihai (ROU)	1

Repechage round
Aywil Fouache (FRA)	2
Mykola Havrychkin (UKR)	6
Milan Németh (HUN)	0
Emre Mutlu (TUR)	8

Bronze medals
Mykola Havrychkin (UKR)	1
Georgios Scarpello (GER)	5
Emre Mutlu (TUR)	WO
Homer Arakelyan (ARM)

== Men's Greco-Roman 60 kg ==
Legend

- F — Won by fall

Main bracket

Round of 16
Suren Aghajanyan (ARM)	10
Kaspars Bondarenko (LAT)	0
Ilias Ayhan (SWE)	10
Volodymyr Voitovych (UKR)	7
Nihat Mammadli (AZE)	8
Eugen Schell (GER)	0
Olivier Skrzypczak (POL)	4
Mert İlbars (TUR)	2
Gildas Chambinaud (FRA)	0
Dimitri Khachidze (GEO)	7
Borislav Kirilov (BUL)	8^{F}
Georgios Papageorgiou (GRE)	0
Melkamu Fetene (ISR)	8
Miguel Santos (POR)	0
Dániel Rafael (HUN)	0
Vitalie Eriomenco (MDA)	9

Quarterfinals
Suren Aghajanyan (ARM)	9
Ilias Ayhan (SWE)	0
Nihat Mammadli (AZE)	13
Olivier Skrzypczak (POL)	5
Dimitri Khachidze (GEO)	9
Borislav Kirilov (BUL)	0
Melkamu Fetene (ISR)	7
Vitalie Eriomenco (MDA)	5

Semifinals
Suren Aghajanyan (ARM)	9
Nihat Mammadli (AZE)	1
Dimitri Khachidze (GEO)	9
Melkamu Fetene (ISR)	0

Final
Suren Aghajanyan (ARM)	4
Dimitri Khachidze (GEO)	0

Repechage round
Kaspars Bondarenko (LAT)	2
Ilias Ayhan (SWE)	10
Gildas Chambinaud (FRA)	2
Borislav Kirilov (BUL)	6^{F}

Bronze medals
Ilias Ayhan (SWE)	0
Nihat Mammadli (AZE)	6
Borislav Kirilov (BUL)	1
Melkamu Fetene (ISR)	6

== Men's Greco-Roman 63 kg ==
Legend

- C — Won by 3 cautions given to the opponent
- F — Won by fall

Main bracket

Round of 16
Yanis Nifri (FRA)	4^{F}
Matouš Jankovič (CZE)	0
Azat Sarıyar (TUR)	14
Luka Vučković (SRB)	5
Edmond Nazaryan (BUL)	11^{F}
Dávid Mányik (HUN)	0
Bredi Slinkers (NED)	9
Tim Bergfalk (SWE)	0
Ziya Babashov (AZE)	2
Oleg Khalilov (UKR)	4
Ruben Miranyan (ARM)	6
Romeo Beridze (GEO)	9
Arslanbek Salimov (POL)	10
Domagoj Celiček (CRO)	2

Quarterfinals
Cristian Costache (ROU)	0
Yanis Nifri (FRA)	7
Azat Sarıyar (TUR)	0
Edmond Nazaryan (BUL)	8^{C}
Bredi Slinkers (NED)	1
Oleg Khalilov (UKR)	3
Romeo Beridze (GEO)	1
Arslanbek Salimov (POL)	5

Semifinals
Yanis Nifri (FRA)	0
Edmond Nazaryan (BUL)	9
Oleg Khalilov (UKR)	2
Arslanbek Salimov (POL)	11

Final
Edmond Nazaryan (BUL)	11
Arslanbek Salimov (POL)	2

Repechage round
Dávid Mányik (HUN)	3
Azat Sarıyar (TUR)	6
Domagoj Celiček (CRO)	0
Romeo Beridze (GEO)	6^{F}

Bronze medals
Azat Sarıyar (TUR)	6
Yanis Nifri (FRA)	4
Romeo Beridze (GEO)	3
Oleg Khalilov (UKR)	5

== Men's Greco-Roman 67 kg ==
Legend

- F — Won by fall

Final

Final
Ashot Khachatryan (ARM)	1
Nika Broladze (GEO)	3

Top half

Round of 32
Nikolaos Kalaidopoulos (GRE)	2
Mairbek Salimov (POL)	10
Momčilo Gajić (SRB)	0
Ashot Khachatryan (ARM)	9
Fritz Reber (SUI)	7
Iosif Ionescu (ROU)	6

Round of 16
Nestori Mannila (FIN)	0
Radoslav Dimitrov (BUL)	8
Mairbek Salimov (POL)	2
Marian Holubovskyi (UKR)	4^{F}
Alessandro Grespi (ITA)	0
Ashot Khachatryan (ARM)	11
Fritz Reber (SUI)	0
Onur Yurtada (TUR)	8

Quarterfinals
Radoslav Dimitrov (BUL)	1
Marian Holubovskyi (UKR)	2
Ashot Khachatryan (ARM)	9
Onur Yurtada (TUR)	0

Semifinals
Marian Holubovskyi (UKR)	1
Ashot Khachatryan (ARM)	4

Bottom half

Round of 32
Kanan Abdullazade (AZE)	3
Magomed Gatagajev (FRA)	2
Artur Jeremejev (EST)	7
Kasper Øverby (NOR)	6
Shon Nadorgin (ISR)	8
Daniel Campos (ESP)	0

Round of 16
Rokas Čepauskas (LTU)	4
Kanan Abdullazade (AZE)	4
Artur Jeremejev (EST)	4
Amadeusz Vitek (HUN)	3^{F}
Nika Broladze (GEO)	10
Shon Nadorgin (ISR)	4
Marco Stoll (GER)	0
Alexei Hahlovschi (MDA)	9

Quarterfinals
Kanan Abdullazade (AZE)	8
Amadeusz Vitek (HUN)	0
Nika Broladze (GEO)	6
Alexei Hahlovschi (MDA)	4

Semifinals
Kanan Abdullazade (AZE)	1
Nika Broladze (GEO)	4

Repechage round 1
Momčilo Gajić (SRB)	10^{F}
Alessandro Grespi (ITA)	4

Repechage round 2
Momcilo Gajic (SRB)	0
Onur Yurtada (TUR)	8
Shon Nadorgin (ISR)	5
Alexei Hahlovschi (MDA)	1

Bronze medal match
Onur Yurtada (TUR)	5
Marian Holubovskyi (UKR)	2
Shon Nadorgin (ISR)	1
Kanan Abdullazade (AZE)	6

== Men's Greco-Roman 72 kg ==
Legend

- F — Won by fall

Final

Final
Gurban Gurbanov (AZE)	1
Attila Tösmagi (HUN)	2

Top half

Round of 32
Dimitar Stefchev (BUL)	1
Edgars Laugalis (LAT)	5
Temuri Orjonikidze (GEO)	8
Ivo Švígler (CZE)	0
Marius Dalsbotten (NOR)	0
Gurban Gurbanov (AZE)	9
Benas Mickevičius (LTU)	5
Steve Momilia (ITA)	14
Júnior Benítez (ESP)	9
Diogo Canilhas (POR)	1

Round of 16
David Loher (SUI)	2
Edgars Laugalis (LAT)	1
Temuri Orjonikidze (GEO)	0
Gurban Gurbanov (AZE)	8
Irfan Mirzoiev (UKR)	9
Steve Momilia (ITA)	0
Júnior Benítez (ESP)	3^{F}
Remo Ojaste (EST)	1

Quarterfinals
David Loher (SUI)	0
Gurban Gurbanov (AZE)	11
Irfan Mirzoiev (UKR)	9
Júnior Benítez (ESP)	0

Semifinals
Gurban Gurbanov (AZE)	8
Irfan Mirzoiev (UKR)	0

Bottom half

Round of 32
Naïm Bolaky-Meïte (FRA)	5
Alexandros Batzakidis (GRE)	6
Alexandru Solovei (MDA)	2
Arman Khachikyan (ARM)	4
Niko Kamenjašević (CRO)	1
Ömer Can Doğan (TUR)	7
Shay El Masandilov (ISR)	0
Matthias Hauthaler (AUT)	11
Aaron Bellscheidt (GER)	11
Ognjen Jakovljević (SRB)	1

Round of 16
Igor Botez (ROU)	8
Alexandros Batzakidis (GRE)	0
Arman Khachikyan (ARM)	1
Attila Tösmagi (HUN)	3
Ömer Can Doğan (TUR)	9
Matthias Hauthaler (AUT)	0
Aaron Bellscheidt (GER)	11
Kewin Metel (POL)	4

Quarterfinals
Igor Botez (ROU)	1
Attila Tösmagii (HUN)	7
Ömer Can Doğan (TUR)	6
Aaron Bellscheidt (GER)	3

Semifinals
Attila Tösmagi (HUN)	7
Ömer Can Doğan (TUR)	4

Repechage round 1
Marius Dalsbotten (NOR)	5
Temuri Orjonikidze (GEO)	7

Repechage round 2
Temuri Orjonikidze (GEO)	5
David Loher (SUI)	0
Arman Khachikyan (ARM)	0
Igor Botez (ROU)	5

Bronze medal match
Temuri Orjonikidze (GEO)	4
Irfan Mirzoiev (UKR)	3
Igor Botez (ROU)	1
Ömer Can Doğan (TUR)	10

== Men's Greco-Roman 77 kg ==
Legend

- F — Won by fall

Final

Final
Tornike Mikeladze (GEO)	2
Alexandrin Guțu (MDA)	3

Top half

Round of 32
Michal Zelenka (CZE)	8
Tykhon Shafranskyi (UKR)	3
Julijan Shehu (ALB)	7
Niko Nikoladze (ISR)	2
Ibrahim Tabaev (BEL)	9
Nicolaos Ignătescu (ROU)	0

Round of 16
Bogdan Stojčić (SRB)	3
Andreas Vasilakopoulos (GRE)	9^{F}
Michal Zelenka (CZE)	0
Deni Nakaev (GER)	7
Tornike Mikeladze (GEO)	9
Julijan Shehu (ALB)	0
Ibrahim Tabaev (BEL)	18^{F}
José Miguel Estévez (ESP)	10

Quarterfinals
Andreas Vasilakopoulos (GRE)	0
Deni Nakaev (GER)	8
Tornike Mikeladze (GEO)	4
Ibrahim Tabaev (BEL)	0

Semifinals
Deni Nakaev (GER)	2
Tornike Mikeladze (GEO)	3

Bottom half

Round of 32
Yüksel Sarıçiçek (TUR)	8
Magomed Edaev (NOR)	0
Alexandrin Guțu (MDA)	5
Simon Borkenhagen (SWE)	0
Henrik Gevorgyan (ARM)	9
Raimond Uibo (EST)	0

Round of 16
Khasay Hasanli (AZE)	1
Yüksel Sarıçiçek (TUR)	3
Alexandrin Guțu (MDA)	8
Andrea Cremonin (ITA)	0
Rajmund Zurai (HUN)	6
Henrik Gevorgyan (ARM)	5
Martin Dimitrov (BUL)	13
Filip Loch (POL)	3

Quarterfinals
Yüksel Sarıçiçek (TUR)	3
Alexandrin Guțu (MDA)	5
Rajmund Zurai (HUN)	4
Martin Dimitrov (BUL)	0

Semifinals
Alexandrin Guțu (MDA)	9
Rajmund Zurai (HUN)	0

Repechage round 1
Simon Borkenhagen (SWE)	10
Andrea Cremonin (ITA)	1

Repechage round 2
Julijan Shehu (ALB)	6
Ibrahim Tabaev (BEL)	10
Simon Borkenhagen (SWE)	0
Yüksel Sarıçiçek (TUR)	8

Bronze medal match
Ibrahim Tabaev (BEL)	1
Deni Nakaev (GER)	7
Yüksel Sarıçiçek (TUR)	7
Rajmund Zurai (HUN)	4

== Men's Greco-Roman 82 kg ==
Legend

- F — Won by fall

Main bracket

Round of 16
Piotr Chełek (POL)	0
Vasile Cojoc (ROU)	4^{F}
Hayk Mkhitaryan (ARM)	1
Leon Rivalta (ITA)	4
Ilia Cernovol (MDA)	0
Jonni Sarkkinen (FIN)	12
Csaba Szinay (HUN)	2
Kalle Laisarv (EST)	5
Ruslan Abdiiev (UKR)	1
Achiko Bolkvadze (GEO)	1
Mátyás Szeiler (SVK)	0
Rauf Aliyev (AZE)	3
Marek Vrba (CZE)	0
Hamza Sertcanli (SWE)	10
Samet Yaldıran (TUR)	9
Ivaylo Plamen Ivanov (BUL)	0

Quarterfinals
Vasile Cojoc (ROU)	8
Leon Rivalta (ITA)	9
Jonni Sarkkinen (FIN)	9
Kalle Laisarv (EST)	1
Achiko Bolkvadze (GEO)	6
Rauf Aliyev (AZE)	1
Hamza Sertcanli (SWE)	10
Samet Yaldıran (TUR)	2

Semifinals
Leon Rivalta (ITA)	1
Jonni Sarkkinen (FIN)	7
Achiko Bolkvadze (GEO)	5
Hamza Sertcanli (SWE)	1

Final
Jonni Sarkkinen (FIN)	4
Achiko Bolkvadze (GEO)	9

Repechage round
Ilia Cernovol (MDA)	7
Kalle Laisarv (EST)	3
Ruslan Abdiiev (UKR)	9
Rauf Aliyev (AZE)	0

Bronze medals
Ilia Cernovol (MDA)	4^{F}
Leon Rivalta (ITA)	0
Ruslan Abdiiev (UKR)	3
Hamza Sertcanli (SWE)	0

== Men's Greco-Roman 87 kg ==
Legend

- F — Won by fall

Final

Final
Lachin Valiyev (AZE)	3
Patrik Gordan (ROU)	1

Top half

Round of 32
Beka Melelashvili (GEO)	4
Vigen Nazaryan (ARM)	5

Round of 16
Robin Uspenski (EST)	4
Davide Stanisci (ITA)	0
Vigen Nazaryan (ARM)	9
Gabriel Lupașco (MDA)	1
Mykyta Alieksieiev (UKR)	5
Lachin Valiyev (AZE)	8
Algot Källman (SWE)	7
Aapo Viitala (FIN)	7

Quarterfinals
Robin Uspenski (EST)	1
Vigen Nazaryan (ARM)	1
Lachin Valiyev (AZE)	4
Algot Källman (SWE)	1

Semifinals
Vigen Nazaryan (ARM)	1
Lachin Valiyev (AZE)	3

Bottom half

Round of 32
Mario Vuković (SRB)	10
Ivan Manov (BUL)	1
Furkan Taş (TUR)	7
Ondřej Havelka (CZE)	0

Round of 16
Dawid Mkrtchyan (POL)	0
Nikolaos Iosifidis (GRE)	9
Mario Vuković (SRB)	10
Artur Urtaev (ISR)	0
László Varsányi (HUN)	1
Furkan Taş (TUR)	3
Damian Matveiko (LTU)	0
Patrik Gordan (ROU)	9

Quarterfinals
Nikolaos Iosifidis (GRE)	4
Mario Vuković (SRB)	0
Furkan Taş (TUR)	1
Patrik Gordan (ROU)	4

Semifinals
Nikolaos Iosifidis (GRE)	1
Patrik Gordan (ROU)	1

Repechage round 2
Mykyta Alieksieiev (UKR)	4
Algot Källman (SWE)	8
Damian Matveiko (LTU)	0
Furkan Taş (TUR)	9

Bronze medals
Algot Källman (SWE)	0
Vigen Nazaryan (ARM)	3
Furkan Taş (TUR)	1
Nikolaos Iosifidis (GRE)	3

== Men's Greco-Roman 97 kg ==
Legend

- F — Won by fall

Main bracket

Round of 16
Kaloyan Ivanov (BUL)	2
Roman Balchivschii (MDA)	1
Gabriele Guerrera (ITA)	0
Connor Sammet (GER)	9
Luka Katić (SRB)	1
Ionuţ Goşa (ROU)	4
Kote Sitchinava (GEO)	5^{F}
Simonas Viliulis (LTU)	0
Yurii Dorohan (UKR)	9
Miklós Mihóka (HUN)	0
Robert Vizy (SVK)	0
Måns Klostermann (SWE)	8
Richard Karelson (EST)	8
Hrant Mikayelyan (ARM)	0

Quarterfinals
Oktay Demir (TUR)	4
Kaloyan Ivanov (BUL)	0
Connor Sammet (GER)	8
Ionuţ Goşa (ROU)	1
Kote Sitchinava (GEO)	1
Yurii Dorohan (UKR)	3
Måns Klostermann (SWE)	4
Richard Karelson (EST)	5

Semifinals
Oktay Demir (TUR)	2
Connor Sammet (GER)	3
Yurii Dorohan (UKR)	0
Richard Karelson (EST)	6

Final
Connor Sammet (GER)	0
Richard Karelson (EST)	3

Repechage round
Gabriele Guerrera (ITA)	6
Ionuţ Goşa (ROU)	7^{F}
Hrant Mikayelyan (ARM)	0
Måns Klostermann (SWE)	9

Bronze medals
Ionuţ Goşa (ROU)	1
Oktay Demir (TUR)	2
Måns Klostermann (SWE)	9
Yurii Dorohan (UKR)	3

== Men's Greco-Roman 130 kg ==
Legend

- F — Won by fall

Main bracket

Round of 16
Adolf Bazsó (HUN)	2
Mate Gokadze (GEO)	1
Dominik Krawczyk (POL)	8^{F}
Achilleas Chrysidis (GRE)	1
Albert Vardanyan (ARM)	2
Mykhailo Vyshnyvetskyi (UKR)	3
Eerik Pank (EST)	9
Alberto Meta (ITA)	0

Quarterfinals
Heybullah Gistarov (AZE)	0
Adolf Bazsó (HUN)	10
Dominik Krawczyk (POL)	2^{F}
Artemijs Fiļimonovs (LAT)	1
Artur Sarkisjan (CZE)	0
Mykhailo Vyshnyvetskyi (UKR)	8
Eerik Pank (EST)	0
Talip Çiftçi (TUR)	9

Semifinals
Adolf Bazsó (HUN)	4
Dominik Krawczyk (POL)	3
Mykhailo Vyshnyvetskyi (UKR)	10^{F}
Talip Çiftçi (TUR)	6

Final
Adolf Bazsó (HUN)	1
Mykhailo Vyshnyvetskyi (UKR)	2

Repechage round
Mate Gokadze (GEO)	9
Heybullah Gistarov (AZE)	0
Albert Vardanyan (ARM)	9
Artur Sarkisjan (CZE)	0

Bronze medals
Mate Gokadze (GEO)	5
Dominik Krawczyk (POL)	8^{F}
Albert Vardanyan (ARM)	7^{F}
Talip Çiftçi (TUR)	0

== See also ==
- 2022 European Juniors Wrestling Championships – Men's freestyle
- 2022 European Juniors Wrestling Championships – Women's freestyle
