= 2022 European Juniors Wrestling Championships – Women's freestyle =

The Women's Freestyle competitions at the 2022 European Juniors Wrestling Championships were held in Rome, Italy between 27 June to 3 July 2022.

== Women's freestyle 50 kg ==
Legend

- F — Won by fall

Final

Final
Şevval Çayır (TUR)	19
Natalia Walczak (POL)	13

Top half

Round of 32
Asmar Jankurtaran (AZE)	5^{F}
Henrietta Gaál (HUN)	0

Round of 16
María Cazalla (ESP)	3
Mariam Grigalashvili (GEO)	10
Asmar Jankurtaran (AZE)	4^{F}
Nelly Johansson (SWE)	0
Şevval Çayır (TUR)	10
Charhazed Ayachi (FRA)	0
Emine Osman (BUL)	2
Svenja Jungo (SUI)	11^{F}

Quarterfinals
Mariam Grigalashvili (GEO)	6
Asmar Jankurtaran (AZE)	2^{F}
Şevval Çayır (TUR)	6
Svenja Jungo (SUI)	2

Semifinals
Asmar Jankurtaran (AZE)	0
Şevval Çayır (TUR)	10

Bottom half

Round of 32
Mirela Racu (MDA)	0
Natalia Walczak (POL)	5^{F}

Round of 16
Jutta Ala-Ranta (FIN)	1
Siria Perrone (ITA)	4
Tetiana Zaiats (UKR)	0
Ana Maria Pîrvu (ROU)	3
Vestina Danisevičiūtė (LTU)	0
Natalia Walczak (POL)	7^{F}
Karolína Müllerová (CZE)	4
Marija Spirkovska (MKD)	6

Quarterfinals
Siria Perrone (ITA)	0
Ana Maria Pîrvu (ROU)	10
Natalia Walczak (POL)	5^{F}
Marija Spirkovska (MKD)	0

Semifinals
Ana Maria Pîrvu (ROU)	6
Natalia Walczak (POL)	8

Repechage round 1
Mirela Racu (MDA)	3
Vestina Danisevičiūtė (LTU)	3

Repechage round 2
Charhazed Ayachi (FRA)	0
Svenja Jungo (SUI)	10^{F}
Vestina Danisevičiūtė (LTU)	8
Marija Spirkovska (MKD)	1

Bronze medal match
Svenja Jungo (SUI)	11
Asmar Jankurtaran (AZE)	16
Vestina Danisevičiūtė (LTU)	2
Ana Maria Pîrvu (ROU)	10

== Women's freestyle 53 kg ==
Legend

- F — Won by fall

Main bracket

Round of 16
Mihaela Samoil (MDA)	11
Emine Çakmak (TUR)	7
Nataliia Klivchutska (UKR)	10
Ellen Östman (SWE)	0
Gultakin Shirinova (AZE)	12
Roberta Luostarinen (FIN)	0
Amory Andrich (GER)	8
Kamilė Šernauskaite (LTU)	0
Chadia Ayachi (FRA)	7
Maria Ferone (ITA)	2
Patricia Iuraşcu (ROU)	7^{F}
Vivien Matyi (HUN)	0
Mihaela Mihova (BUL)	0
Nikola Wiśniewska (POL)	9^{F}

Quarterfinals
Carla Jaume (ESP)	3
Mihaela Samoil (MDA)	10^{F}
Nataliia Klivchutska (UKR)	10^{F}
Gultakin Shirinova (AZE)	4
Amory Andrich (GER)	12^{F}
Chadia Ayachi (FRA)	1
Patricia Iuraşcu (ROU)	7^{F}
Nikola Wiśniewska (POL)	0

Semifinals
Mihaela Samoil (MDA)	2
Nataliia Klivchutska (UKR)	2
Amory Andrich (GER)	10
Patricia Iuraşcu (ROU)	0

Final
Mihaela Samoil (MDA)	0
Amory Andrich (GER)	8^{F}

Repechage round
Emine Çakmak (TUR)	11
Carla Jaume (ESP)	5
Kamilė Šernauskaite (LTU)	1
Chadia Ayachi (FRA)	7

Bronze medals
Emine Çakmak (TUR)	2
Nataliia Klivchutska (UKR)	7
Chadia Ayachi (FRA)	6
Patricia Iuraşcu (ROU)	4

== Women's freestyle 55 kg ==
Legend

- F — Won by fall

Main bracket

Round of 16
Jannicke Strømnes (NOR)	0
Nazife Tair (BUL)	5
Elnura Mammadova (AZE)	7
Immacolata Danise (ITA)	0
Rebekka March (GER)	6
Laurie Lesaffre (FRA)	3
Tuba Demir (TUR)	3
Albina Rillia (UKR)	1

Quarterfinals
Laura Stanelytė (LTU)	2
Nazife Tair (BUL)	7^{F}
Elnura Mammadova (AZE)	4^{F}
Róza Szenttamási (HUN)	0
Kriszta Kafai (ROU)	9
Rebekka March (GER)	10^{F}
Tuba Demir (TUR)	4
Patrycja Strzelczyk (POL)	1

Semifinals
Nazife Tair (BUL)	0
Elnura Mammadova (AZE)	6^{F}
Rebekka March (GER)	0
Tuba Demir (TUR)	10

Final
Elnura Mammadova (AZE)	10
Tuba Demir (TUR)	1

Repechage round
Immacolata Danise (ITA)	11
Róza Szenttamási (HUN)	2
Albina Rillia (UKR)	8
Patrycja Strzelczyk (POL)	1

Bronze medals
Immacolata Danise (ITA)	10
Nazife Tair (BUL)	0
Albina Rillia (UKR)	7
Rebekka March (GER)	1

== Women's freestyle 57 kg ==
Legend

- F — Won by fall

Main bracket

Round of 16
Adrienn Béres (HUN)	0
Othelie Høie (NOR)	7^{F}

Quarterfinals
Céleste Sion (FRA)	4
Othelie Høie (NOR)	3
Oleksandra Khomenets (UKR)	5^{F}
Georgiana Lircă (ROU)	0
Marie Trayer (GER)	1
Aurora Russo (ITA)	9
Melda Dernekçi (TUR)	12
Julia Nowicka (POL)	2

Semifinals
Céleste Sion (FRA)	4
Oleksandra Khomenets (UKR)	4^{F}
Aurora Russo (ITA)	11
Melda Dernekçi (TUR)	0

Final
Oleksandra Khomenets (UKR)	4
Aurora Russo (ITA)	1

Bronze medal match
Georgiana Lircă (ROU)	3
Céleste Sion (FRA)	2
Marie Trayer (GER)	2
Melda Dernekçi (TUR)	10

== Women's freestyle 59 kg ==
Legend

- F — Won by fall

Main bracket

Round of 16
Ebru Dağbaşı (TUR)	6
Hedda Kvåle (NOR)	1
Ilaria Salvaterra (ITA)	0
Yulia Leskovets (UKR)	10
Jovana Radivojević (SRB)	2^{F}
Aleksandra Witos (POL)	2

Quarterfinals
Anna Michalcová (CZE)	0
Ebru Dağbaşı (TUR)	4
Viktória Borsos (HUN)	8
Luna Rothenberger (GER)	4
Ana Maria Puiu (ROU)	0
Yulia Leskovets (UKR)	10
Jovana Radivojević (SRB)	3
Fatme Shaban (BUL)	10

Semifinals
Ebru Dağbaşı (TUR)	5
Viktória Borsos (HUN)	1
Yulia Leskovets (UKR)	10
Fatme Shaban (BUL)	0

Final
Ebru Dağbaşı (TUR)	0
Yulia Leskovets (UKR)	10

Repechage round
Hedda Kvåle (NOR)	2
Anna Michalcová (CZE)	3^{F}
Ilaria Salvaterra (ITA)	0
Ana Maria Puiu (ROU)	10

Bronze medals
Anna Michalcová (CZE)	0
Viktória Borsos (HUN)	8
Ana Maria Puiu (ROU)	4
Fatme Shaban (BUL)	3^{F}

== Women's freestyle 62 kg ==
Legend

- F — Won by fall

Final

Final
Luisa Scheel (GER)	3
Birgul Soltanova (AZE)	4

Top half

Round of 32
Elmas Çelik (TUR)	3
Iva Gerić (CRO)	4

Round of 16
Karina Andžāne (LAT)	2
Bianca Contrafatto (ITA)	12
Iva Gerić (CRO)	7
Viktoria Øverby (NOR)	6
Luisa Scheel (GER)	7
Mima Taneva (BUL)	1
Jennica Källberg (SWE)	1
Wiktoria Staneta (POL)	10^{F}

Quarterfinals
Bianca Contrafatto (ITA)	1
Iva Gerić (CRO)	2^{F}
Luisa Scheel (GER)	7
Wiktoria Staneta (POL)	4

Semifinals
Iva Gerić (CRO)	0
Luisa Scheel (GER)	5

Bottom half

Round of 32

Round of 16
Iryna Bondar (UKR)	4^{F}
Teodora Sîrbu (ROU)	0
Yasmine Soliman (HUN)	4
Evangelia Tranou (GRE)	0
Ineta Dantaitė (LTU)	7
Maša Perović (SRB)	6
Iris Thiébaux (FRA)	0
Birgul Soltanova (AZE)	10

Quarterfinals
Iryna Bondar (UKR)	11
Yasmine Soliman (HUN)	0
Ineta Dantaitė (LTU)	0
Birgul Soltanova (AZE)	11

Semifinals
Iryna Bondar (UKR)	11
Birgul Soltanova (AZE)	6^{F}

Repechage round 2
Mima Taneva (BUL)	0
Wiktoria Staneta (POL)	4
Iris Thiébaux (FRA)	10
Ineta Dantaitė (LTU)	0

Bronze medals
Wiktoria Staneta (POL)	2
Iva Gerić (CRO)	6
Iris Thiébaux (FRA)	0
Iryna Bondar (UKR)	4^{F}

== Women's freestyle 65 kg ==
Legend

- F — Won by fall

Main bracket

Round of 16
Manola Skobelska (UKR)	11
Zofia Polowczyk (POL)	0

Quarterfinals
Chiara Hirt (GER)	0
Manola Skobelska (UKR)	4^{F}
Gia Kastelan (CRO)	0
Derya Nur Karaduman (TUR)	4^{F}
Enikő Elekes (HUN)	10
Nora Svensson (SWE)	0
Veronica Braschi (ITA)	5^{F}
Orsolja Fabijan (SRB)	4

Semifinals
Manola Skobelska (UKR)	4^{F}
Derya Nur Karaduman (TUR)	0
Enikő Elekes (HUN)	9
Veronica Braschi (ITA)	0

Final
Manola Skobelska (UKR)	7
Enikő Elekes (HUN)	0

Repechage round
Zofia Polowczyk (POL)	10^{F}
Chiara Hirt (GER)	2

Bronze medals
Zofia Polowczyk (POL)	13
Derya Nur Karaduman (TUR)	6
Nora Svensson (SWE)	4
Veronica Braschi (ITA)	3

== Women's freestyle 68 kg ==
Legend

- F — Won by fall

Main bracket

Round of 16
Patrycja Słomska (POL)	10
Daniela Brasnarova (BUL)	0
Sophia Schäfle (GER)	5
Nigar Mirzazada (AZE)	4
Laura Godino (ITA)	6
Yevheniia Siedykh (UKR)	1

Quarterfinals
Caroline Kvist (SWE)	8
Patrycja Słomska (POL)	2
Luciana Beda (MDA)	2^{F}
Yasmín Alonso (ESP)	0
Nesrin Baş (TUR)	6
Sophia Schäfle (GER)	2
Laura Godino (ITA)	10
Fruzsina Terék (HUN)	0

Semifinals
Caroline Kvist (SWE)	8
Luciana Beda (MDA)	12
Nesrin Baş (TUR)	13^{F}
Laura Godino (ITA)	2

Final
Luciana Beda (MDA)	0
Nesrin Baş (TUR)	10

Bronze medals
Yasmín Alonso (ESP)	0
Caroline Kvist (SWE)	10
Sophia Schäfle (GER)	7
Laura Godino (ITA)	1

== Women's freestyle 72 kg ==
Legend

- F — Won by fall

Main bracket

Round of 16
Patrycja Cuber (POL)	0
Nazar Batır (TUR)	2
Zsófi Virág (HUN)	10
Fabiana Dattilo (ITA)	2

Quarterfinals
Emilia Creciun (MDA)	2
Nazar Batır (TUR)	4
Vanesa Georgieva (BUL)	2
Jennifer Rösler (GER)	2^{F}
Marziya Sadigova (AZE)	2
Iryna Zablotska (UKR)	8^{F}
Zsófi Virág (HUN)	10
Paula Rotaru (ROU)	4

Semifinals
Nazar Batır (TUR)	6
Jennifer Rösler (GER)	3
Iryna Zablotska (UKR)	10
Zsófi Virág (HUN)	0

Final
Nazar Batır (TUR)	0
Iryna Zablotska (UKR)	5^{F}

Repechage round
Patrycja Cuber (POL)	3
Emilia Creciun (MDA)	1

Bronze medals
Patrycja Cuber (POL)	2
Jennifer Rösler (GER)	5
Marziya Sadigova (AZE)	6^{F}
Zsófi Virág (HUN)	10

== Women's freestyle 76 kg ==
Legend

- F — Won by fall

Main bracket

Round of 16
Eleni Chrysikaki (GRE)	7^{F}
Anna Iodice (ITA)	2

Quarterfinals
Mariia Orlevych (UKR)	9
Eleni Chrysikaki (GRE)	0
Elena Margaș (ROU)	8^{F}
Melisa Sarıtaç (TUR)	2
Laura Kühn (GER)	3^{F}
Vanesa Kaloyanova (BUL)	0
Veronika Nyikos (HUN)	10^{F}
Daniela Tkachuk (POL)	8

Semifinals
Mariia Orlevych (UKR)	8^{F}
Elena Margaș (ROU)	2
Laura Kühn (GER)	5
Veronika Nyikos (HUN)	8

Final
Mariia Orlevych (UKR)	2
Veronika Nyikos (HUN)	6

Bronze medals
Eleni Chrysikaki (GRE)	0
Elena Margaș (ROU)	3
Daniela Tkachuk (POL)	4^{F}
Laura Kühn (GER)	4

== See also ==
- 2022 European Juniors Wrestling Championships – Men's freestyle
- 2022 European Juniors Wrestling Championships – Men's Greco-Roman
