= 2020 Individual Wrestling World Cup – Women's freestyle 72 kg =

The Women's freestyle 72 kg is a competition featured at the 2020 Individual Wrestling World Cup, and was held in Belgrade, Serbia on 14 and 15 December 2020.

== Medalists ==
Gold	Yuliana Yaneva; Bulgaria
Silver	Buse Tosun; Turkey
Bronze	Zsuzsanna Molnár; Slovakia
Bronze	Alla Belinska; Ukraine

== Results ==
Legend

- F — Won by fall

1/8 finals
Gursharan Preet Kaur (IND)	11
Buse Tosun (TUR)	12

Quarterfinals
Zsuzsanna Molnár (SVK)	7
Yanet Sovero (PER)	4
Yuliana Yaneva (BUL)	9
Luz Vázquez (ARG)	0
Alla Belinska (UKR)	10^{F}
Maria Selmaier (GER)	2
Evgeniia Zakharchenko (RUS)	7
Buse Tosun (TUR)	9

Semifinals
Zsuzsanna Molnár (SVK)	2
Yuliana Yaneva (BUL)	7
Alla Belinska (UKR)	2
Buse Tosun (TUR)	6

Final
Yuliana Yaneva (BUL)	5
Buse Tosun (TUR)	2

Repechage round 1
Gursharan Preet Kaur (IND)	0
Evgeniia Zakharchenko (RUS)	10

Bronze medals
Luz Vázquez (ARG)	2
Zsuzsanna Molnár (SVK)	2^{F}
Evgeniia Zakharchenko (RUS)	2
Alla Belinska (UKR)	6^{F}
