= Pauline Lecarpentier =

French freestyle wrestler (born 1997)

Personal information
- Full name: Pauline Denise Lecarpentier
- Born: May 1997 (age 29)

Sport
- Country: France
- Sport: Amateur wrestling
- Weight class: 68 kg; 72 kg; 76 kg
- Event: Freestyle
Medal record
Women's freestyle wrestling
Representing France
European Championships
Silver medal – second place	2022 Budapest	68 kg
Bronze medal – third place	2023 Zagreb	72 kg
Bronze medal – third place	2025 Bratislava	72 kg
Mediterranean Games
Gold medal – first place	2022 Oran	68 kg
Bronze medal – third place	2026 Taranto	68 kg
Jeux de la Francophonie
Bronze medal – third place	2017 Abidjan	69 kg
World Military Championships
Gold medal – first place	2024 Yerevan	72 kg
Dan Kolov - Nikola Petrov Tournament
Silver medal – second place	2022 Tarnovo	68 kg
Silver medal – second place	2024 Sofia	76 kg
European U23 Championships
Bronze medal – third place	2019 Novi Sad	65 kg
European Cadets Championships
Bronze medal – third place	2014 Samokov	70 kg

Pauline Denise Lecarpentier (born May 1997) is a French freestyle wrestler. She won the silver medal in the women's 68 kg event at the 2022 European Wrestling Championships held in Budapest, Hungary. She won the gold medal in her event at the 2022 Mediterranean Games held in Oran, Algeria.

== Career ==
Lecarpentier won one of the bronze medals in the women's freestyle 68 kg event at the 2017 Jeux de la Francophonie held in Abidjan, Ivory Coast. A month later, she was eliminated in her first match in the women's freestyle 75 kg event at the World Wrestling Championships held in Paris, France.

In 2018, Lecarpentier finished in 4th place in the women's freestyle 68 kg event at the Mediterranean Games held in Tarragona, Spain. She won the silver medal in the 62 kg event at the Grand Prix de France Henri Deglane 2019 held in Nice, France. She competed in the 65 kg event at the 2019 European Wrestling Championships held in Bucharest, Romania. In 2020, Lecarpentier competed in the 76 kg event at the Individual Wrestling World Cup held in Belgrade, Serbia.

In January 2021, Lecarpentier won the silver medal in the 76 kg event at the Grand Prix de France Henri Deglane 2021 held in Nice, France. In March 2021, she competed at the European Qualification Tournament in Budapest, Hungary hoping to qualify for the 2020 Summer Olympics in Tokyo, Japan. In May 2021, she failed to qualify for the Olympics at the World Qualification Tournament held in Sofia, Bulgaria.

Lecarpentier won the silver medal in the 68 kg event at the 2022 Dan Kolov & Nikola Petrov Tournament held in Veliko Tarnovo, Bulgaria. A month later, she also won the silver medal in the 68 kg event at the 2022 European Wrestling Championships held in Budapest, Hungary. A few months later, Lecarpentier won the gold medal in the 68 kg event at the 2022 Mediterranean Games held in Oran, Algeria. She defeated Buse Tosun Çavuşoğlu of Turkey in her gold medal match. In September 2022, she competed in the 68 kg event at the World Wrestling Championships held in Belgrade, Serbia.

Lecarpentier won the silver medal in the 68 kg event at the Grand Prix de France Henri Deglane 2023 held in Nice, France. She won one of the bronze medals in her event at the 2023 Grand Prix Zagreb Open held in Zagreb, Croatia. Lecarpentier won one of the bronze medals in the 72 kg event at the 2023 European Wrestling Championships held in Zagreb, Croatia.

In February 2024, Lecarpentier lost her bronze medal match in the 76 kg event at the European Wrestling Championships held in Bucharest, Romania. Two months later, she competed at the 2024 European Wrestling Olympic Qualification Tournament in Baku, Azerbaijan hoping to qualify for the 2024 Summer Olympics in Paris, France. She was eliminated in her third match and she did not qualify for the Olympics at this event. Lecarpentier also competed at the 2024 World Wrestling Olympic Qualification Tournament held in Istanbul, Turkey without qualifying for the Olympics. She lost her Olympic wrestle-off match against Enkh-Amaryn Davaanasan of Mongolia. In October 2024, Lecarpentier competed in the 72 kg event at the World Wrestling Championships held in Tirana, Albania. She was eliminated in her first match.

== Achievements ==
Year	Tournament	Location	Result	Event
2022	European Championships	Budapest, Hungary	2nd	Freestyle 68 kg
2022	Mediterranean Games	Oran, Algeria	1st	Freestyle 68 kg
2023	European Championships	Zagreb, Croatia	3rd	Freestyle 72 kg
2025	European Championships	Bratislava, Slovakia	3rd	Freestyle 72 kg
2026	Mediterranean Games	Taranto, Italy	3rd	Freestyle 68 kg
