= Alexandra Anghel =

Romanian freestyle wrestler

Personal information
- Full name: Alexandra Nicoleta Anghel
- Born: 28 June 1997 (age 29)
- Height: 165 cm (5 ft 5 in)

Sport
- Country: Romania
- Sport: Amateur wrestling
- Weight class: 72 kg
- Event: Freestyle
Medal record
Women's freestyle wrestling
Representing Romania
World Championships
Bronze medal – third place	2022 Belgrade	72 kg
European Championships
Gold medal – first place	2023 Zagreb	72 kg
Silver medal – second place	2024 Bucharest	72 kg
Bronze medal – third place	2018 Kaspiysk	72 kg
Bronze medal – third place	2025 Bratislava	72 kg
Yasar Dogu Tournament
Bronze medal – third place	2022 Istanbul	72 kg
Bronze medal – third place	2020 Istanbul	68 kg
Bronze medal – third place	2017 Istanbul	69 kg
World U23 Championships
Silver medal – second place	2018 Bucharest	72 kg
European U23 Championship
Bronze medal – third place	2018 Istanbul	72 kg

Alexandra Anghel (born 28 June 1997) is a Romanian freestyle wrestler. She won one of the bronze medals in the 72 kg event at the 2022 World Wrestling Championships held in Belgrade, Serbia. She is a five-time medalist, including gold, in her event at the European Wrestling Championships.

== Career ==
Anghel won one of the bronze medals in the 72 kg event at the 2018 European Wrestling Championships held in Kaspiysk, Russia. In 2019, she lost the bronze medal match in the 72 kg event at the European Wrestling Championships held in Bucharest, Romania. In the same year, Anghel also competed in the 72 kg event at the 2019 World Wrestling Championships where she lost her first match against Natalia Vorobieva. In the repechage she was eliminated from the competition by Masako Furuichi of Japan.

In February 2022, Anghel won one of the bronze medals in the 72 kg event at the Yasar Dogu Tournament held in Istanbul, Turkey. In April 2022, she lost her bronze medal match in the 72 kg event at the European Wrestling Championships held in Budapest, Hungary. A few months later, she won the bronze medal in her event at the Matteo Pellicone Ranking Series 2022 held in Rome, Italy. Anghel won one of the bronze medals in the 72 kg event at the 2022 World Wrestling Championships held in Belgrade, Serbia, behind American gold medal winner Amit Elor and Kazakh silver medal winner Zhamila Bakbergenova.

Anghel won the gold medal in the 72 kg event at the 2023 European Wrestling Championships held in Zagreb, Croatia. She defeated Buse Tosun of Turkey in her gold medal match. Anghel also competed in the 68 kg event at the 2023 World Wrestling Championships held in Belgrade, Serbia where she was eliminated in her first match.

Anghel won the silver medal in the 72 kg event at the 2024 European Wrestling Championships held in Bucharest, Romania. In the final, she lost against Nesrin Baş of Turkey. Anghel competed at the 2024 European Wrestling Olympic Qualification Tournament in Baku, Azerbaijan hoping to qualify for the 2024 Summer Olympics in Paris, France. She was eliminated in her second match and she did not qualify for the Olympics. Anghel also competed at the 2024 World Wrestling Olympic Qualification Tournament held in Istanbul, Turkey without qualifying for the Olympics. She lost her Olympic wrestle-off match against Linda Morais of Canada.

== Achievements ==
Year	Tournament	Location	Result	Event
2018	European Championships	Kaspiysk, Russia	3rd	Freestyle 72 kg
2022	World Championships	Belgrade, Serbia	3rd	Freestyle 72 kg
2023	European Championships	Zagreb, Croatia	1st	Freestyle 72 kg
2024	European Championships	Bucharest, Romania	2nd	Freestyle 72 kg
2025	European Championships	Bratislava, Slovakia	3rd	Freestyle 72 kg
