= Nesrin Baş =

Turkish freestyle wrestler (born 2002)

Personal information
- Born: 25 June 2002 (age 24) Tokat, Turkey
- Education: Gaziosmanpaşa University
- Height: 1.70 m (5 ft 7 in)
- Weight: 68 kg (150 lb)

Sport
- Country: Turkey
- Sport: Women's freestyle wrestling
- Event: 68 kg
- Club: Beşiktaş J.K.
Medal record
Women's freestyle wrestling
Representing Turkey
World Championships
Silver medal – second place	2025 Zagreb	72 kg
European Championships
Gold medal – first place	2024 Bucharest	72 kg
Silver medal – second place	2025 Bratislava	72 kg
Bronze medal – third place	2023 Zagreb	68 kg
Mediterranean Games
Gold medal – first place	2026 Taranto	68 kg
Yasar Dogu Tournament
Silver medal – second place	2023 Istanbul	68 kg
World U23 Championships
Gold medal – first place	2022 Pontevedra	68 kg
Gold medal – first place	2023 Tirana	68 kg
Silver medal – second place	2024 Tirana	68 kg
European U23 Championships
Gold medal – first place	2023 Bucharest	68 kg
Gold medal – first place	2025 Tirana	68 kg
Bronze medal – third place	2021 Skopje	68 kg
Bronze medal – third place	2024 Baku	65 kg
World Juniors Championships
Bronze medal – third place	2021 Ufa	68 kg
Bronze medal – third place	2022 Sofia	68 kg
European Juniors Championships
Gold medal – first place	2022 Rome	68 kg

Nesrin Baş (born 25 June 2002) is a Turkish freestyle wrestler competing in the 68 kg division. She is a member of Beşiktaş J.K.. She won the silver medal in the 72 kg event at the 2025 World Wrestling Championships held in Zagreb, Croatia. She won the gold medal at the 2024 European Wrestling Championships.

== Career ==
In 2021, Nesrin Baş won a bronze medal in the women's 68 kg event at the 2021 World Junior Wrestling Championships in Russia, behind gold medal winner Amit Elor of the United States and silver medal winner Elizaveta Petliakova of Russia.

She competed in the 68 kg event at the 2022 World Wrestling Championships held in Belgrade, Serbia. She won the gold medal in her event at the 2023 European U23 Wrestling Championships held in Bucharest, Romania. She won the gold medal in the women's 68 kg event at the 2022 U23 World Wrestling Championships held in Pontevedra, Spain.

In 2023, she won one of the bronze medals in the women's freestyle 68 kg event at the 2023 European Wrestling Championships held in Zagreb, Croatia. Nesrin, who started the championship from the qualifying round, qualified for the repechage match after her opponent reached the final despite losing to Bulgarian Yuliana Yaneva. Meeting Hungarian Noemi Szabados in the repechage, Nesrin won the bronze medal match with a 4-0 victory. In the bronze medal competition, Nesrin Baş won the bronze medal after her Czech rival Adela Hanzlickova could not compete due to injury.

She won the gold medal at the 2024 European Wrestling Championships in Bucharest, Romania, by defeating Romanian Alexandra Anghel 5-1 in the women's freestyle 72 kg final. She had reached the final after defeating Belarusian Viktoryia Radzkova 7-0 in the quarterfinals and Polish Wiktoria Chołuj 2-1 in the semifinals. She competed at the 2024 World Wrestling Olympic Qualification Tournament held in Istanbul, Turkey and she earned a quota place for Turkey for the 2024 Summer Olympics in Paris, France. She competed in the women's 62 kg event at the Olympics.
