= 2023 European Wrestling Championships =

Wrestling competition held in Zagreb, Croatia

2023 European Championships
- Host city: Zagreb, Croatia
- Dates: 17-23 April 2023
- Stadium: Arena Zagreb

Champions
- Freestyle: Azerbaijan
- Greco-Roman: Turkey
- Women: Ukraine

The 2023 European Wrestling Championships was held from 17 to 23 April 2023 in Zagreb, Croatia.

== Medal table ==
* Host nation (Croatia)

Rank	Nation	Gold	Silver	Bronze	Total
1	Turkey	6	3	8	17
2	Azerbaijan	5	6	3	14
3	Armenia	4	0	1	5
4	Ukraine	3	4	4	11
5	Bulgaria	3	3	5	11
6	Georgia	2	2	7	11
7	Romania	2	0	3	5
8	Hungary	1	2	3	6
9	Moldova	1	2	1	4
10	Greece	1	1	1	3
11	Slovakia	1	0	1	2
12	Sweden	1	0	0	1
13	Norway	0	1	4	5
14	France	0	1	3	4
14	Serbia	0	1	3	4
16	Italy	0	1	2	3
17	Albania	0	1	0	1
17	Austria	0	1	0	1
17	San Marino	0	1	0	1
20	Germany	0	0	5	5
21	Poland	0	0	3	3
22	Croatia*	0	0	1	1
22	Czech Republic	0	0	1	1
22	North Macedonia	0	0	1	1
Totals (24 entries)		30	30	60	120

== Medal overview ==
=== Men's freestyle ===
Event	Gold	Silver	Bronze
57 kg	Aliabbas Rzazade; Azerbaijan	Süleyman Atlı; Turkey	Horst Lehr; Germany
57 kg	Aliabbas Rzazade; Azerbaijan	Süleyman Atlı; Turkey	Georgi Vangelov; Bulgaria
61 kg	Arsen Harutyunyan; Armenia	Zelimkhan Abakarov; Albania	Emrah Ormanoğlu; Turkey
61 kg	Arsen Harutyunyan; Armenia	Zelimkhan Abakarov; Albania	Shota Phartenadze; Georgia
65 kg	Vazgen Tevanyan; Armenia	Mikyay Naim; Bulgaria	Erik Arushanian; Ukraine
65 kg	Vazgen Tevanyan; Armenia	Mikyay Naim; Bulgaria	Edemi Bolkvadze; Georgia
70 kg	Haji Aliyev; Azerbaijan	Ramazan Ramazanov; Bulgaria	Vasile Diacon; Moldova
70 kg	Haji Aliyev; Azerbaijan	Ramazan Ramazanov; Bulgaria	Ihor Nykyforuk; Ukraine
74 kg	Tajmuraz Salkazanov; Slovakia	Frank Chamizo; Italy	Avtandil Kentchadze; Georgia
74 kg	Tajmuraz Salkazanov; Slovakia	Frank Chamizo; Italy	Soner Demirtaş; Turkey
79 kg	Vasyl Mykhailov; Ukraine	Georgios Kougioumtsidis; Greece	Khetag Tsabolov; Serbia
79 kg	Vasyl Mykhailov; Ukraine	Georgios Kougioumtsidis; Greece	Ahmad Magomedov; North Macedonia
86 kg	Dauren Kurugliev; Greece	Myles Amine; San Marino	Abubakr Abakarov; Azerbaijan
86 kg	Dauren Kurugliev; Greece	Myles Amine; San Marino	Sebastian Jezierzański; Poland
92 kg	Feyzullah Aktürk; Turkey	Osman Nurmagomedov; Azerbaijan	Miriani Maisuradze; Georgia
92 kg	Feyzullah Aktürk; Turkey	Osman Nurmagomedov; Azerbaijan	Ermak Kardanov; Slovakia
97 kg	Givi Matcharashvili; Georgia	Magomedkhan Magomedov; Azerbaijan	İbrahim Çiftçi; Turkey
97 kg	Givi Matcharashvili; Georgia	Magomedkhan Magomedov; Azerbaijan	Vladislav Baitcaev; Hungary
125 kg	Taha Akgül; Turkey	Geno Petriashvili; Georgia	Giorgi Meshvildishvili; Azerbaijan
125 kg	Taha Akgül; Turkey	Geno Petriashvili; Georgia	Dániel Ligeti; Hungary

=== Men's Greco-Roman ===
Event	Gold	Silver	Bronze
55 kg	Adem Uzun; Turkey	Eldaniz Azizli; Azerbaijan	Denis Mihai; Romania
55 kg	Adem Uzun; Turkey	Eldaniz Azizli; Azerbaijan	Nugzari Tsurtsumia; Georgia
60 kg	Edmond Nazaryan; Bulgaria	Victor Ciobanu; Moldova	Nihat Mammadli; Azerbaijan
60 kg	Edmond Nazaryan; Bulgaria	Victor Ciobanu; Moldova	Georgii Tibilov; Serbia
63 kg	Leri Abuladze; Georgia	Taleh Mammadov; Azerbaijan	Abu Muslim Amaev; Bulgaria
63 kg	Leri Abuladze; Georgia	Taleh Mammadov; Azerbaijan	Hrachya Poghosyan; Armenia
67 kg	Hasrat Jafarov; Azerbaijan	Joni Khetsuriani; Georgia	Parviz Nasibov; Ukraine
67 kg	Hasrat Jafarov; Azerbaijan	Joni Khetsuriani; Georgia	Håvard Jørgensen; Norway
72 kg	Ulvu Ganizade; Azerbaijan	Ibrahim Ghanem; France	Kamil Czarnecki; Poland
72 kg	Ulvu Ganizade; Azerbaijan	Ibrahim Ghanem; France	Selçuk Can; Turkey
77 kg	Malkhas Amoyan; Armenia	Viktor Nemeš; Serbia	Yunus Emre Başar; Turkey
77 kg	Malkhas Amoyan; Armenia	Viktor Nemeš; Serbia	Zoltán Lévai; Hungary
82 kg	Burhan Akbudak; Turkey	Yaroslav Filchakov; Ukraine	Roland Schwarz; Germany
82 kg	Burhan Akbudak; Turkey	Yaroslav Filchakov; Ukraine	Filip Šačić; Croatia
87 kg	István Takács; Hungary	Ali Cengiz; Turkey	Semen Novikov; Bulgaria
87 kg	István Takács; Hungary	Ali Cengiz; Turkey	Lasha Gobadze; Georgia
97 kg	Artur Aleksanyan; Armenia	Kiril Milov; Bulgaria	Mikheil Kajaia; Serbia
97 kg	Artur Aleksanyan; Armenia	Kiril Milov; Bulgaria	Artur Omarov; Czech Republic
130 kg	Rıza Kayaalp; Turkey	Sabah Shariati; Azerbaijan	Iakobi Kajaia; Georgia
130 kg	Rıza Kayaalp; Turkey	Sabah Shariati; Azerbaijan	Oskar Marvik; Norway

=== Women's freestyle ===
Event	Gold	Silver	Bronze
50 kg	Mariya Stadnik; Azerbaijan	Oksana Livach; Ukraine	Evin Demirhan; Turkey
50 kg	Mariya Stadnik; Azerbaijan	Oksana Livach; Ukraine	Emanuela Liuzzi; Italy
53 kg	Jonna Malmgren; Sweden	Stalvira Orshush; Hungary	Zeynep Yetgil; Turkey
53 kg	Jonna Malmgren; Sweden	Stalvira Orshush; Hungary	Maria Prevolaraki; Greece
55 kg	Andreea Ana; Romania	Erika Bognár; Hungary	Tatiana Debien; France
55 kg	Andreea Ana; Romania	Erika Bognár; Hungary	Katarzyna Krawczyk; Poland
57 kg	Alina Hrushyna; Ukraine	Zhala Aliyeva; Azerbaijan	Evelina Nikolova; Bulgaria
57 kg	Alina Hrushyna; Ukraine	Zhala Aliyeva; Azerbaijan	Elena Brugger; Germany
59 kg	Anastasia Nichita; Moldova	Yuliya Tkach; Ukraine	Othelie Høie; Norway
59 kg	Anastasia Nichita; Moldova	Yuliya Tkach; Ukraine	Sandra Paruszewski; Germany
62 kg	Iryna Koliadenko; Ukraine	Grace Bullen; Norway	Luisa Niemesch; Germany
62 kg	Iryna Koliadenko; Ukraine	Grace Bullen; Norway	Bilyana Dudova; Bulgaria
65 kg	Mimi Hristova; Bulgaria	Irina Rîngaci; Moldova	Kriszta Incze; Romania
65 kg	Mimi Hristova; Bulgaria	Irina Rîngaci; Moldova	Tetiana Rizhko; Ukraine
68 kg	Yuliana Yaneva; Bulgaria	Alla Belinska; Ukraine	Nesrin Baş; Turkey
68 kg	Yuliana Yaneva; Bulgaria	Alla Belinska; Ukraine	Koumba Larroque; France
72 kg	Alexandra Anghel; Romania	Buse Tosun; Turkey	Pauline Lecarpentier; France
72 kg	Alexandra Anghel; Romania	Buse Tosun; Turkey	Dalma Caneva; Italy
76 kg	Yasemin Adar; Turkey	Martina Kuenz; Austria	Cătălina Axente; Romania
76 kg	Yasemin Adar; Turkey	Martina Kuenz; Austria	Marion Bye; Norway

== Participating nations ==
463 competitors from 36 nations participated:

1. Albania (6)
2. Armenia (18)
3. Austria (8)
4. Azerbaijan (28)
5. Bulgaria (24)
6. Croatia (13) (Host)
7. Czech Republic (4)
8. Denmark (3)
9. Spain (11)
10. Estonia (8)
11. Finland (6)
12. France (18)
13. United Kingdom (1)
14. Georgia (20)
15. Germany (25)
16. Greece (10)
17. Hungary (22)
18. Israel (8)
19. Italy (18)
20. Kosovo (1)
21. Latvia (3)
22. Lithuania (13)
23. Moldova (23)
24. North Macedonia (9)
25. Netherlands (2)
26. Norway (8)
27. Poland (23)
28. Portugal (1)
29. Romania (17)
30. San Marino (2)
31. Serbia (18)
32. Switzerland (11)
33. Slovakia (8)
34. Sweden (11)
35. Turkey (30)
36. Ukraine (30)
37. UWW - United World Wrestling (2)
