= Nurzat Nurtaeva =

Kyrgyzstani freestyle wrestler (born 2002)

Personal information
- National team: Kyrgyzstan
- Born: 9 January 2002 (age 24)

Sport
- Country: Kyrgyzstan
- Sport: Wrestling
Medal record
Women's freestyle wrestling
Representing Kyrgyzstan
World Championships
Bronze medal – third place	2025 Zagreb	72 kg
Asian Games
Silver medal – second place	2022 Hangzhou	68 kg
Asian Championships
Bronze medal – third place	2026 Bishkek	72 kg
CIS Games
Gold medal – first place	2023 Minsk	72 kg
World U23 Championships
Gold medal – first place	2025 Novi Sad	72 kg
U20 World Championships
Silver medal – second place	2022 Sofia	68 kg

Nurzat Nurtaeva (Kyrgyz: Нурзат Нуртаева, born 9 January 2002) is a Kyrgyzstani freestyle wrestler who has competed in the 68 kg and 72 kg division. She is a gold medalist at the CIS Games, silver medalist at the Asian Games and a bronze medalist at the Asian and World Championships.

== Career ==
In April 2022, Nurtaeva competed in her event at the 2022 Asian Wrestling Championships held in Ulaanbaatar, Mongolia. Four months later, she competed in the 72 kg event at the 2021 Islamic Solidarity Games held in Konya, Turkey. Also that month, she competed in the U20 World Wrestling Championships held in Sofia, Bulgaria, where she lost to Ami Ishii in the gold medal match.

Nurtaeva competed at the 2023 Asian Wrestling Championships held in Astana, Kazakhstan, where in the quarterfinals, she lost to Reetika Hooda, the latter in whom went on to win a bronze medal. In August, she competed in the women's 72 kg event at the 2023 CIS Games held in Minsk, Belarus, where she defeated Victoria Radkova in the gold medal match. She then competed in the women's 68 kg event at the 2022 Asian Games held in Hangzhou, China, where she lost to Zhou Feng in the gold medal match.

In the first half of 2024, Nurtaeva competed in her event at the Asian Wrestling Championships and U23 Asian Wrestling Championships, winning a gold medal in the latter. She returned to the U23 Asian Wrestling Championships the following year and won the gold medal again. In September 2025, Nurtaeva competed in the 72 kg event at the World Wrestling Championships held in Zagreb, Croatia, where she won a bronze medal. The following month, she competed at the U23 World Wrestling Championships in the 72 kg category, where she won the gold medal.

In April 2026, Nurtaeva competed at the Asian Wrestling Championships and won a bronze medal in the 72 kg category.
