= 2023 European Wrestling Championships – Women's freestyle 76 kg =

Wrestling competition

Women's freestyle 76 kg at the 2023 European Wrestling Championships
- Venue: Arena Zagreb
- Location: Zagreb, Croatia
- Dates: 19-20 April
- Competitors: 13

Medalists
| gold medal | Yasemin Adar | Turkey |
| silver medal | Martina Kuenz | Austria |
| bronze medal | Cătălina Axente | Romania |
| bronze medal | Marion Bye | Norway |

The women's freestyle 76 kg is a competition featured at the 2023 European Wrestling Championships, and will held in Zagreb, Croatia on April 19 and 20.

== Results ==
Legend

- F — Won by fall

Round of 16
Francy Rädelt (GER) | 2
Cătălina Axente (ROU) | 2
Agoro Papavasiliou (GRE) | 4^{F}
Fanni Nađ (SRB) | 2
Enrica Rinaldi (ITA) | 0
Anastasiia Osniach (UKR) | 11^{F}
Marta Besek (CRO) | 2
Marion Bye (NOR) | 12
Kamilė Gaučaitė (LTU) | 1
~~Cynthia Vescan (FRA)~~ | 8

Quarterfinals
Yasemin Adar (TUR) | 10
Cătălina Axente (ROU) | 0
Agoro Papavasiliou (GRE) | 0
Anastasiia Osniach (UKR) | 6^{F}
Martina Kuenz (AUT) | 10
Marion Bye (NOR) | 0
~~Cynthia Vescan (FRA)~~ | 3
Epp Mäe (EST) | 2

Semifinals
Yasemin Adar (TUR) | 14
Anastasiia Osniach (UKR) | 4
Martina Kuenz (AUT) | 2
~~Cynthia Vescan (FRA)~~ | 1

Final
Yasemin Adar (TUR) | 2
Martina Kuenz (AUT) | 2

Bronze medal match
Cătălina Axente (ROU) | 5
Anastasiia Osniach (UKR) | 3
Marion Bye (NOR) | 0
~~Cynthia Vescan (FRA)~~ | 10

== Final standing ==
| Rank | Athlete |
|---|---|
| 1st place, gold medalist(s) | Yasemin Adar (TUR) |
| 2nd place, silver medalist(s) | Martina Kuenz (AUT) |
| 3rd place, bronze medalist(s) | Cătălina Axente (ROU) |
| 3rd place, bronze medalist(s) | Marion Bye (NOR) |
| 5 | Anastasiia Osniach (UKR) |
| 6 | Agoro Papavasiliou (GRE) |
| 7 | Francy Rädelt (GER) |
| 8 | Epp Mäe (EST) |
| 9 | Marta Besek (CRO) |
| 10 | Kamilė Gaučaitė (LTU) |
| 11 | Fanni Nađ (SRB) |
| 12 | Enrica Rinaldi (ITA) |
| DQ | Cynthia Vescan (FRA) |
