= 2022 World Wrestling Championships – Women's freestyle 76 kg =

Wrestling competitions

Women's freestyle 76 kg at the 2022 World Championships
- Venue: Štark Arena
- Dates: 13–14 September 2022
- Competitors: 25 from 25 nations

Medalists
gold medal	Yasemin Adar Yiğit	Turkey
silver medal	Samar Amer	Egypt
bronze medal	Yuka Kagami	Japan
bronze medal	Epp Mäe	Estonia

The women's freestyle 76 kilograms is a competition featured at the 2022 World Wrestling Championships, and was held in Belgrade, Serbia on 13 and 14 September 2022.

This freestyle wrestling competition consists of a single-elimination tournament, with a repechage used to determine the winner of two bronze medals. The two finalists face off for gold and silver medals. Each wrestler who loses to one of the two finalists moves into the repechage, culminating in a pair of bronze medal matches featuring the semifinal losers each facing the remaining repechage opponent from their half of the bracket.

== Results ==
Legend

- F — Won by fall

=== Final ===
Final
Yasemin Adar Yiğit (TUR)	6
Samar Amer (EGY)	0

=== Top half ===
Round of 32
Wang Juan (CHN)	9
Kamilė Gaučaitė (LTU)	1
Génesis Reasco (ECU)	10
Priyanka (IND)	0
Amy Youin (CIV)	0
Cătălina Axente (ROU)	8
Dymond Guilford (USA)	0
Yuka Kagami (JPN)	3
Fani Nađ (SRB)	0
Gulmaral Yerkebayeva (KAZ)	6^{F}

Round of 16
Aiperi Medet Kyzy (KGZ)	1
Wang Juan (CHN)	7
Génesis Reasco (ECU)	7
Cătălina Axente (ROU)	6
Francy Rädelt (GER)	1
Yuka Kagami (JPN)	2
Gulmaral Yerkebayeva (KAZ)	0
Yasemin Adar Yiğit (TUR)	10

Quarterfinals
Wang Juan (CHN)	3
Génesis Reasco (ECU)	5
Yuka Kagami (JPN)	2
Yasemin Adar Yiğit (TUR)	4

Semifinals
Génesis Reasco (ECU)	3
Yasemin Adar Yiğit (TUR)	4

=== Bottom half ===
Round of 32
Enrica Rinaldi (ITA)	0
Ganbatyn Ariunjargal (MGL)	6^{F}
Jeong Seo-yeon (KOR)	1
Milaimys Marín (CUB)	5
Tatiana Rentería (COL)	10^{F}
Jemima Nyarko (GHA)	0
Justina Di Stasio (CAN)	10
Đặng Thị Linh (VIE)	0

Round of 16
Epp Mäe (EST)	4^{F}
Ganbatyn Ariunjargal (MGL)	3
Milaimys Marín (CUB)	0
Anastasiia Osniach (UKR)	11
Martina Kuenz (AUT)	10
Tatiana Rentería (COL)	0
Justina Di Stasio (CAN)	1
Samar Amer (EGY)	3

Quarterfinals
Epp Mäe (EST)	5
Anastasiia Osniach (UKR)	3
Martina Kuenz (AUT)	1
Samar Amer (EGY)	3

Semifinals
Epp Mäe (EST)	2
Samar Amer (EGY)	3

=== Repechage ===
Repechage round 2
Gulmaral Yerkebayeva (KAZ)	1
Yuka Kagami (JPN)	2
Justina Di Stasio (CAN)	3
Martina Kuenz (AUT)	3

Bronze medals
Yuka Kagami (JPN)	4
Génesis Reasco (ECU)	0
Justina Di Stasio (CAN)	1
Epp Mäe (EST)	2

== Final standing ==
Rank	Athlete
1st place, gold medalist(s)	Yasemin Adar Yiğit (TUR)
2nd place, silver medalist(s)	Samar Amer (EGY)
3rd place, bronze medalist(s)	Yuka Kagami (JPN)
3rd place, bronze medalist(s)	Epp Mäe (EST)
5	Génesis Reasco (ECU)
5	Justina Di Stasio (CAN)
7	Wang Juan (CHN)
8	Gulmaral Yerkebayeva (KAZ)
9	Martina Kuenz (AUT)
10	Tatiana Rentería (COL)
11	Ganbatyn Ariunjargal (MGL)
12	Anastasiia Osniach (UKR)
13	Cătălina Axente (ROU)
14	Milaimys Marín (CUB)
15	Francy Rädelt (GER)
16	Jeong Seo-yeon (KOR)
17	Aiperi Medet Kyzy (KGZ)
18	Kamilė Gaučaitė (LTU)
19	Dymond Guilford (USA)
20	Fani Nađ (SRB)
21	Enrica Rinaldi (ITA)
22	Amy Youin (CIV)
23	Priyanka (IND)
24	Jemima Nyarko (GHA)
25	Đặng Thị Linh (VIE)
