= Wrestling at the 2024 Summer Olympics – Women's freestyle 76 kg =

Women's freestyle 76 kg at the Games of the XXXIII Olympiad
- Venue: Grand Palais Éphémère
- Date: 10–11 August 2024
- Competitors: 16 from 16 nations

Medalists
1st place, gold medalist(s)		Yuka Kagami	Japan
2nd place, silver medalist(s)		Kennedy Blades	United States
3rd place, bronze medalist(s)		Milaimys Marín	Cuba
3rd place, bronze medalist(s)		Tatiana Rentería	Colombia

Women's freestyle 76 kilograms competition at the 2024 Summer Olympics in Paris, France, took place on 10–11 August 2024 at the Grand Palais Éphémère in Champ de Mars.

== Background ==
This is the sixth appearance of the women's heavyweight category, debut in 2004 and it has been appeared in every games since then.

- 2004-2012: 72kg
- 2016: 75kg
- 2020-current: 76kg

Yuka Kagami won the event by defeating Kennedy Blades in the final, Tatiana Rentería and Milaimys Marín won the bronze medals with Marín going through the repechages.

== Format ==
This freestyle wrestling competition consists of a single-elimination tournament, with a repechage used to determine the winner of two bronze medals. The two finalists face off for gold and silver medals. Each wrestler who loses to one of the two finalists moves into the repechage, culminating in a pair of bronze medal matches featuring the semifinal losers each facing the remaining repechage opponent from their half of the bracket.

== Rules ==
A typical bout consists of two halves of three minutes each separated by a 30-second break. The two competitors compete on a mat, which is nine meters in diameter. Wrestlers try to score points by executing various legal maneuvers. Points ranging from one to five are awarded by the mat referee depending on the degree of difficulty of the maneuvers. Points are also awarded to the opponent in case of infractions such as illegal holds, passivity etc. A wrestler is automatically disqualified if three cautions are awarded during a bout. Forcing an opponent's shoulders to the mat results in an instant victory by fall.

During the course of a match, if a wrestler builds a 10-point advantage over the opponent, the bout is stopped and the leader is declared as the winner by technical superiority. The total scores are totaled at the end of the stipulated six-minute period, and the wrestler with the maximum points wins. In case of a tie, the wrestler who has scored the last point is declared the winner. A competitor might also be declared a winner if the opponent does not turn up or is medically unfit to compete.

== Qualification ==
Sixteen quota places were available with each nation restricted to a maximum of one spot. Five quota places were awarded at the 2023 World Wrestling Championships, which took place from the 16th to 24th of September in Belgrade, Serbia. The finalists of each category in the four continental qualification tournaments (Asia, Europe, the Americas, and the joint Africa & Oceania) were awarded quota places. The remainder of the total quota was allocated at the 2024 World Wrestling Olympic Qualification Tournament, offering a minimum of three quota places.

== Schedule ==
All times are Central European Time (UTC+02:00)

Date	Time	Event
10 August 2024	11:00	Qualification rounds
10 August 2024	18:15	Semifinals
11 August 2024	11:00	Repechage
11 August 2024	19:30	Finals

== Results ==
Sixteen athletes qualified for the competition.

Legend

- F — Won by fall
- WO — Won by walkover

=== Main bracket ===
Round of 16
Aiperi Medet Kyzy (KGZ)	4
Wang Juan (CHN)	1
Reetika Hooda (IND)	12
Bernadett Nagy (HUN)	2
Milaimys Marín (CUB)	7
Yuliana Yaneva (BUL)	1
Kennedy Blades (USA)	11
Cătălina Axente (ROU)	0
Tatiana Rentería (COL)	8
Zaineb Sghaier (TUN)	4
Enkh-Amaryn Davaanasan (MGL)	5
Hannah Reuben (NGR)	2
Justina Di Stasio (CAN)	2
Yasemin Adar Yiğit (TUR)	8
Génesis Reasco (ECU)	0
Yuka Kagami (JPN)	2

Quarterfinals
Aiperi Medet Kyzy (KGZ)	1
Reetika Hooda (IND)	1
Milaimys Marín (CUB)	3
Kennedy Blades (USA)	4
Tatiana Rentería (COL)	6
Enkh-Amaryn Davaanasan (MGL)	3
Yasemin Adar Yiğit (TUR)	0
Yuka Kagami (JPN)	3

Semifinals
Aiperi Medet Kyzy (KGZ)	6
Kennedy Blades (USA)	8
Tatiana Rentería (COL)	2
Yuka Kagami (JPN)	4

Final
Kennedy Blades (USA)	1
Yuka Kagami (JPN)	3

=== Repechage ===
Repechage
Cătălina Axente (ROU)
Milaimys Marín (CUB)	WO
Génesis Reasco (ECU)	3
Yasemin Adar Yiğit (TUR)	1

Bronze medal matches
Milaimys Marín (CUB)	6
Aiperi Medet Kyzy (KGZ)	0
Génesis Reasco (ECU)	1
Tatiana Rentería (COL)	2

== Final standing ==
Rank	Athlete
1st place, gold medalist(s)	Yuka Kagami (JPN)
2nd place, silver medalist(s)	Kennedy Blades (USA)
3rd place, bronze medalist(s)	Tatiana Rentería (COL)
3rd place, bronze medalist(s)	Milaimys Marín (CUB)
5	Aiperi Medet Kyzy (KGZ)
5	Génesis Reasco (ECU)
7	Reetika Hooda (IND)
8	Yasemin Adar Yiğit (TUR)
9	Enkh-Amaryn Davaanasan (MGL)
10	Zaineb Sghaier (TUN)
11	Hannah Reuben (NGR)
12	Justina Di Stasio (CAN)
13	Bernadett Nagy (HUN)
14	Wang Juan (CHN)
15	Yuliana Yaneva (BUL)
16	Cătălina Axente (ROM)
