= 2022 Wrestling World Cup – Women's freestyle =

Women's freestyle at the 2022 Wrestling World Cup
- Venue: Xtream Arena
- Location: Coralville, Iowa, United States
- Dates: December 10–11
- Competitors: 72
- Teams: 6

Medalists
gold medal	Ukraine
silver medal	China
bronze medal	Mongolia

The 2022 Wrestling World Cup – Women's freestyle was the second Wrestling World Cup in 2022 which took place in Coralville, Iowa, United States on December 10–11, 2022.

== Pool stage ==
Teams qualified for the 1st place match
Teams qualified for the 3rd place match

=== Pool A ===
Pos	Team	Pld	W	L	CP	TP
1	Ukraine	2	2	0	56	81
2	Mongolia	2	1	1	34	76
3	Japan	2	0	2	35	61

Source: UWW

POOL A
Round I

Japan 5 – 5.df Mongolia
Weight	Japan	result	Mongolia
50 kg	Hanano Sakurai	3 – 3	Dolgorjavyn Otgonjargal
53 kg	Rino Kataoka	5 – 1	Ganbaataryn Otgonjargal
55 kg	Moe Kiyooka	6 – 4	Bat-Ochiryn Bolortuyaa
57 kg	Ruka Natami	3 – 0	Bat-Erdeniin Erdenesuvd
59 kg	Himeka Tokuhara	5 – 3	Erkhembayaryn Davaachimeg
62 kg	Yui Sakano	5 – 7	Sükheegiin Tserenchimed
65 kg	Miyu Imai	4 – 9	Pürevdorjiin Orkhon
68 kg	Kumi Kobayashi	0 – 6^{F}	Ölziisaikhany Pürevsüren
72 kg	Yuka Fujikura	– WO	Enkh-Amaryn Davaanasan
76 kg	Nodoka Yamamoto	2 – 0	Ochirbatyn Burmaa

Round II

Mongolia 3 – 7 Ukraine
Weight	Mongolia	result	Ukraine
50 kg	Dolgorjavyn Otgonjargal	8 – 2	Oksana Livach
53 kg	Ganbaataryn Otgonjargal	6 – 4	Albina Rillia
55 kg	Bat-Ochiryn Bolortuyaa	0 – 5^{F}	Alina Hrushyna
57 kg	Bat-Erdeniin Erdenesuvd	0 – 2^{F}	Yuliya Tkach
59 kg	Erkhembayaryn Davaachimeg	0 – 4^{F}	Iryna Bondar
62 kg	Sükheegiin Tserenchimed	12 – 7	Iryna Koliadenko
65 kg	Pürevdorjiin Orkhon	10 – 12	Kateryna Zelenykh
68 kg	Ölziisaikhany Pürevsüren	2 – 5	Tetiana Sova
72 kg	Enkh-Amaryn Davaanasan	5 – 6	Alla Belinska
76 kg	Enkhbayaryn Tsevegmid	0 – 4^{F}	Anastasiia Osniach

Round III

Ukraine 5.df – 5 Japan
Weight	Ukraine	result	Japan
50 kg	Oksana Livach	1 – 3	Hanano Sakurai
53 kg	Albina Rillia	2 – 2	Rino Kataoka
55 kg	Alina Hrushyna	3 – 0	Moe Kiyooka
57 kg	Yuliya Tkach	4 – 0	Ruka Natami
59 kg	Iryna Bondar	6 – 4	Himeka Tokuhara
62 kg	Iryna Koliadenko	2 – 13	Yui Sakano
65 kg	Kateryna Zelenykh	4 – 4	Miyu Imai
68 kg	Tetiana Sova	6^{F} – 0	Kumi Kobayashi
72 kg	Alla Belinska	WO –	Yuka Fujikura
76 kg	Anastasiia Osniach	2 – 2	Nodoka Yamamoto

=== Pool B ===
Pos	Team	Pld	W	L	CP	TP
1	China	2	2	0	52	119
2	United States	2	1	1	35	68
3	All-World Team	2	0	2	33	70

Source: UWW

POOL B
Round I

United States 2 – 8 China
Weight	United States	result	China
50 kg	Emily Shilson	0 – 10	Zhu Jiang
53 kg	Amy Fearnside	0 – 10	Deng Li
55 kg	Jenna Burkert	0 – 4	Pang Qianyu
57 kg	Amanda Martinez	0 – 10	Feng Yongxin
59 kg	Michaela Beck	0 – 11	Zhang Qi
62 kg	Kayla Miracle	4 – 6	Luo Xiaojuan
65 kg	Mallory Velte	8 – 12	Long Jia
68 kg	Sienna Ramirez	0 – 10	Zhou Feng
72 kg	Amit Elor	5 – 0	Qiandegenchagan
76 kg	Dymond Guilford	7 – 2	Wang Juan

Round II

China 5.df – 5 All-World Team
Weight	China	result	All-World Team
50 kg	Zhu Jiang	4^{F} – 2	Anna Łukasiak
53 kg	Deng Li	2 – 1	Maria Prevolaraki
55 kg	Pang Qianyu	4 – 0	Karla Godinez
57 kg	Feng Yongxin	14 – 6^{R}	Zhala Aliyeva
59 kg	Zhang Qi	1 – 2^{F}	Anastasia Nichita
62 kg	Luo Xiaojuan	0 – 4	Aisuluu Tynybekova
65 kg	Long Jia	8 – 10	Mimi Hristova
68 kg	Zhou Feng	4 – 7	Irina Rîngaci
72 kg	Qiandegenchagan	2 – 4	Zhamila Bakbergenova
76 kg	Wang Juan	5 – 1	Yasemin Adar

Round III

All-World Team 4 – 6 United States
Weight	All-World Team	result	United States
50 kg	Anna Łukasiak	0 – 6	Erin Golston
53 kg	Maria Prevolaraki	4 – 1	Felicity Taylor
55 kg	Karla Godinez	0 – 4	Jenna Burkert
57 kg	Zhala Aliyeva	– WO	Alexandra Hedrick
59 kg	Anastasia Nichita	12 – 2	Lexie Basham
62 kg	Aisuluu Tynybekova	3 – 9	Kayla Miracle
65 kg	Mimi Hristova	0 – 12^{F}	Mallory Velte
68 kg	Irina Rîngaci	4 – 2	Solin Piearcy
72 kg	Zhamila Bakbergenova	6 – 0	Skylar Grote
76 kg	Yasemin Adar	4 – 8^{F}	Yelena Makoyed

== Medal Matches ==
Medal Matches
First-Place Match

Ukraine 6 – 4 China
Weight	Ukraine	result	China
50 kg	Oksana Livach	4 – 4	Zhu Jiang
53 kg	Albina Rillia	1 – 2	Deng Li
55 kg	Alina Hrushyna	4 – 1	Pang Qianyu
57 kg	Yuliya Tkach	4^{F} – 0	Feng Yongxin
59 kg	Iryna Bondar	2 – 7	Zhang Qi
62 kg	Iryna Koliadenko	4^{F} – 0	Sun Xinyuan
65 kg	Kateryna Zelenykh	12 – 12^{F}	Long Jia
68 kg	Tetiana Sova	5 – 4	Han Yue
72 kg	Alla Belinska	1 – 9	Qiandegenchagan
76 kg	Anastasiia Osniach	9 – 5	Wang Juan

Third-Place Match

Mongolia 7 – 3 United States
Weight	Mongolia	result	United States
50 kg	Dolgorjavyn Otgonjargal	6^{F} – 0	Erin Golston
53 kg	Ganbaataryn Otgonjargal	12 – 1	Felicity Taylor
55 kg	Bat-Ochiryn Bolortuyaa	7 – 6	Jenna Burkert
57 kg	Bat-Erdeniin Erdenesuvd	4 – 6	Alexandra Hedrick
59 kg	Erkhembayaryn Davaachimeg	13 – 2	Lexie Basham
62 kg	Sükheegiin Tserenchimed	16 – 5	Kayla Miracle
65 kg	Pürevdorjiin Orkhon	9 – 6	Mallory Velte
68 kg	Ölziisaikhany Pürevsüren	0 – 2	Solin Piearcy
72 kg	Enkh-Amaryn Davaanasan	7 – 1	Skylar Grote
76 kg	Ochirbatyn Burmaa	0 – 10	Dymond Guilford

== Final ranking ==
Team	Pld	W	L
Ukraine	3	3	0
China	3	2	1
Mongolia	3	2	1
United States	3	1	2
All-World Team	2	0	2
Japan	2	0	2

== See also ==
- 2022 Wrestling World Cup - Men's freestyle
- 2022 Wrestling World Cup - Men's Greco-Roman
