= 2024 European Wrestling Championships – Women's freestyle 76 kg =

Wrestling competition

Women's freestyle 76 kg at the 2024 European Wrestling Championships
- Venue: Polyvalent Hall
- Location: Bucharest, Romania
- Dates: 15-16 February
- Competitors: 12

Medalists
| gold medal | Yasemin Adar Yiğit | Turkey |
| silver medal | Anastasiia Osniach | Ukraine |
| bronze medal | Enrica Rinaldi | Italy |
| bronze medal | Bernadett Nagy | Hungary |

The women's freestyle 76 kg is a competition featured at the 2024 European Wrestling Championships held in Bucharest, Romania on February 14 and 15.

== Results ==
Legend

- F — Won by fall

=== Main bracket ===
Round of 16
Daniela Tkachuk (POL) | 0
Enrica Rinaldi (ITA) | 10
Kamilė Gaučaitė (LTU) | 3
Epp Mäe (EST) | 2
Francy Rädelt (GER) | 1
Anastasiia Osniach (UKR) | 10
Pauline Lecarpentier (FRA) | 7
Ksenia Burakova (AIN) | 1
Yasemin Adar Yiğit (TUR) | 10
Vanesa Georgieva (BUL) | 0
Aikaterini Pitsiava (GRE) | 0
Bernadett Nagy (HUN) | 10

Quarterfinals
Cătălina Axente (ROU) | 1
Enrica Rinaldi (ITA) | 1
Kamilė Gaučaitė (LTU) | 0
Anastasiia Osniach (UKR) | 2^{F}
Pauline Lecarpentier (FRA) | 3
Yasemin Adar Yiğit (TUR) | 7
Bernadett Nagy (HUN) | 10
Anastasiya Zimiankova (AIN) | 0

Semifinals
Enrica Rinaldi (ITA) | 0
Anastasiia Osniach (UKR) | 3^{F}
Yasemin Adar Yiğit (TUR) | 4^{F}
Bernadett Nagy (HUN) | 0

Final
Anastasiia Osniach (UKR) | 1
Yasemin Adar Yiğit (TUR) | 12

=== Repechage ===
Repechage round 1
Francy Rädelt (GER) | 1
Kamilė Gaučaitė (LTU) | 2
Vanesa Georgieva (BUL) | 1
Pauline Lecarpentier (FRA) | 6

Bronze medal match
Kamilė Gaučaitė (LTU) | 2
Enrica Rinaldi (ITA) | 5
Pauline Lecarpentier (FRA) | 3
Bernadett Nagy (HUN) | 8

== Final standing ==
| Rank | Athlete |
|---|---|
| 1st place, gold medalist(s) | Yasemin Adar Yiğit (TUR) |
| 2nd place, silver medalist(s) | Anastasiia Osniach (UKR) |
| 3rd place, bronze medalist(s) | Enrica Rinaldi (ITA) |
| 3rd place, bronze medalist(s) | Bernadett Nagy (HUN) |
| 5 | Kamilė Gaučaitė (LTU) |
| 5 | Pauline Lecarpentier (FRA) |
| 7 | Francy Rädelt (GER) |
| 8 | Epp Mäe (EST) |
| 9 | Cătălina Axente (ROU) |
| 10 | Ksenia Burakova (AIN) |
| 11 | Vanesa Georgieva (BUL) |
| 12 | Anastasiya Zimiankova (AIN) |
| 13 | Daniela Tkachuk (POL) |
| 14 | Aikaterini Pitsiava (GRE) |
