= Martina Kuenz =

Austrian freestyle wrestler (born 1994)

Personal information
- Born: 1 November 1994 (age 32)
- Height: 170 cm (5 ft 7 in)

Sport
- Country: Austria
- Sport: Amateur wrestling
- Weight class: 76 kg
- Event: Freestyle
Medal record
Women's freestyle wrestling
Representing Austria
World Championships
| Bronze medal – third place | 2018 Budapest | 72 kg |
European Championships
| Silver medal – second place | 2019 Bucharest | 76 kg |
| Silver medal – second place | 2023 Zagreb | 76 kg |
| Bronze medal – third place | 2018 Kaspiysk | 68 kg |
| Bronze medal – third place | 2025 Bratislava | 76 kg |
| Bronze medal – third place | 2026 Tirana | 76 kg |
Yasar Dogu Tournament
| Silver medal – second place | 2022 Istanbul | 76 kg |
European U23 Championships
| Silver medal – second place | 2016 Ruse | 69 kg |
| Silver medal – second place | 2017 Szombathely | 69 kg |

Martina Kuenz (born 1 November 1994) is an Austrian freestyle wrestler. At the 2018 World Wrestling Championships held in Budapest, Hungary, she won one of the bronze medals in the women's 72 kg event. She is also a five-time medalist at the European Wrestling Championships.

== Career ==
In 2010, Kuenz competed in the girls' freestyle 70 kg event at the Summer Youth Olympics held in Singapore. She finished in 5th place. In 2013, she was eliminated in her first match in the 67 kg event at the European Wrestling Championships held in Tbilisi, Georgia.

Kuenz represented Austria at the 2015 European Games in Baku, Azerbaijan; she lost her bronze medal match in the 69 kg event. She also represented Austria four years later in the 76 kg event at the 2019 European Games in Minsk, Belarus. In this competition, she was eliminated by Natalia Vorobieva of Russia in the repechage.

In 2019, Kuenz won the silver medal in the 76 kg event at the European Wrestling Championships held in Bucharest, Romania. In the final, she lost against Yasemin Adar of Turkey.

In January 2021, Kuenz won the gold medal in the 76 kg event at the Grand Prix de France Henri Deglane 2021 held in Nice, France. In March 2021, she competed at the European Qualification Tournament in Budapest, Hungary hoping to qualify for the 2020 Summer Olympics in Tokyo, Japan. She did not qualify as she lost her match in the semi-finals against Natalia Vorobieva. Kuenz also failed to qualify for the Olympics at the World Olympic Qualification Tournament held in Sofia, Bulgaria. She lost her match in the semi-finals against Yasemin Adar of Turkey and she then also lost her bronze medal match against Milaimys Marín of Cuba.

In 2022, Kuenz won the silver medal in the 76 kg event at the Yasar Dogu Tournament held in Istanbul, Turkey. She competed in the 76 kg event at the 2022 European Wrestling Championships held in Budapest, Hungary where she was eliminated in her first match. A few months later, Kuenz won the bronze medal in her event at the Matteo Pellicone Ranking Series 2022 held in Rome, Italy.

Kuenz competed in the 76 kg event at the 2022 World Wrestling Championships held in Belgrade, Serbia. She won her first match against Tatiana Rentería of Colombia and she then lost against eventual silver medalist Samar Amer of Egypt. Kuenz was then eliminated in the repechage by Justina Di Stasio of Canada.

Kuenz won the silver medal in the 76 kg event at the 2023 European Wrestling Championships held in Zagreb, Croatia. In the final, she lost against Yasemin Adar of Turkey. In 2024, she competed at the European Wrestling Olympic Qualification Tournament in Baku, Azerbaijan hoping to qualify for the 2024 Summer Olympics in Paris, France. She was eliminated in her third match and she did not qualify for the Olympics at this event. Kuenz also competed at the 2024 World Wrestling Olympic Qualification Tournament held in Istanbul, Turkey without qualifying for the Olympics. She lost her first match and she was eliminated in the second round of the repechage.

In 2025, Kuenz defeated Enrica Rinaldi of Italy to win a bronze medal in the 76 kg event at the European Wrestling Championships held in Bratislava, Slovakia.

== Achievements ==
| Year | Tournament | Location | Result | Event |
|---|---|---|---|---|
| 2018 | European Championships | Kaspiysk, Russia | 3rd | Freestyle 68 kg |
| 2018 | World Championships | Budapest, Hungary | 3rd | Freestyle 72 kg |
| 2019 | European Championships | Bucharest, Romania | 2nd | Freestyle 76 kg |
| 2023 | European Championships | Zagreb, Croatia | 2nd | Freestyle 76 kg |
| 2025 | European Championships | Bratislava, Slovakia | 3rd | Freestyle 76 kg |
| 2026 | European Championships | Tirana, Albania | 3rd | Freestyle 76 kg |
