= 2023 World Wrestling Championships – Women's freestyle 76 kg =

Wrestling competitions

Women's freestyle 76 kg at the 2023 World Championships
- Venue: Štark Arena
- Dates: 19–20 September 2023
- Competitors: 29 from 26 nations

Medalists
gold medal	Yuka Kagami	Japan
silver medal	Aiperi Medet Kyzy	Kyrgyzstan
bronze medal	Tatiana Rentería	Colombia
bronze medal	Adeline Gray	United States

The women's freestyle 76 kg is a competition featured at the 2023 World Wrestling Championships, and was held in Belgrade, Serbia on 19 and 20 September 2023.

This freestyle wrestling competition consists of a single-elimination tournament, with a repechage used to determine the winner of two bronze medals. The two finalists face off for gold and silver medals. Each wrestler who loses to one of the two finalists moves into the repechage, culminating in a pair of bronze medal matches featuring the semifinal losers each facing the remaining repechage opponent from their half of the bracket.

== Results ==
Legend

- F — Won by fall
- R — Retired

=== Final ===
Final
Aiperi Medet Kyzy (KGZ)	0^{R}
Yuka Kagami (JPN)	8

=== Top half ===
Round of 32
Atzimba Landaverde (MEX)	4
Rita Talismanova (AIN)	10^{F}
Hannah Reuben (NGR)	13
Naigalsürengiin Zagardulam (MGL)	7
Tatiana Rentería (COL)	7
Francy Rädelt (GER)	1
Aiperi Medet Kyzy (KGZ)	11
Cătălina Axente (ROU)	0
Inkara Zhanatayeva (KAZ)	1
Anastasiya Zimiankova (AIN)	6
Divya Kakran (UWW)	7
Mehtap Gültekin (TUR)	5
Đặng Thị Linh (VIE)	0
Justina Di Stasio (CAN)	10

Round of 16
Samar Amer (EGY)	2^{F}
Rita Talismanova (AIN)	0
Hannah Reuben (NGR)	2
Tatiana Rentería (COL)	6
Aiperi Medet Kyzy (KGZ)	10
Anastasiya Zimiankova (AIN)	0
Divya Kakran (UWW)	4
Justina Di Stasio (CAN)	4

Quarterfinals
Samar Amer (EGY)	0
Tatiana Rentería (COL)	5^{F}
Aiperi Medet Kyzy (KGZ)	11
Justina Di Stasio (CAN)	0

Semifinals
Tatiana Rentería (COL)	2
Aiperi Medet Kyzy (KGZ)	4^{F}

=== Bottom half ===
Round of 32
Adeline Gray (USA)	10
Baek Ji-min (KOR)	0
María Acosta (VEN)	2
Huang Yuanyuan (CHN)	9
Kamilė Gaučaitė (LTU)	0
Yuka Kagami (JPN)	10^{F}
Cynthia Vescan (FRA)	12
Amy Youin (CIV)	5
Svetlana Oknazarova (UZB)	2
Anastasiya Alpyeyeva (UKR)	5^{F}
Milaimys Marín (CUB)	10
Enrica Rinaldi (ITA)	0

Round of 16
Epp Mäe (EST)	0
Adeline Gray (USA)	11
Huang Yuanyuan (CHN)	0
Yuka Kagami (JPN)	6
Cynthia Vescan (FRA)	0
Anastasiya Alpyeyeva (UKR)	5
Milaimys Marín (CUB)	5^{F}
Génesis Reasco (ECU)	4

Quarterfinals
Adeline Gray (USA)	1
Yuka Kagami (JPN)	4
Anastasiya Alpyeyeva (UKR)	2
Milaimys Marín (CUB)	6

Semifinals
Yuka Kagami (JPN)	5
Milaimys Marín (CUB)	2

=== Repechage ===
Repechage round 1
Cătălina Axente (ROU)	12
Anastasiya Zimiankova (AIN)	1
Kamilė Gaučaitė (LTU)	0
Huang Yuanyuan (CHN)	8

Repechage round 2
Cătălina Axente (ROU)	2
Justina Di Stasio (CAN)	0
Huang Yuanyuan (CHN)	0
Adeline Gray (USA)	8^{F}

Bronze medals
Cătălina Axente (ROU)	1
Tatiana Rentería (COL)	8^{F}
Adeline Gray (USA)	10
Milaimys Marín (CUB)	6

Olympic wrestle-off
Cătălina Axente (ROU)	0
Milaimys Marín (CUB)	8^{F}

== Final standing ==
Rank	Athlete
1st place, gold medalist(s)	Yuka Kagami (JPN)
2nd place, silver medalist(s)	Aiperi Medet Kyzy (KGZ)
3rd place, bronze medalist(s)	Tatiana Rentería (COL)
3rd place, bronze medalist(s)	Adeline Gray (USA)
5	Milaimys Marín (CUB)
5	Cătălina Axente (ROU)
7	Anastasiya Alpyeyeva (UKR)
8	Justina Di Stasio (CAN)
9	Huang Yuanyuan (CHN)
10	Rita Talismanova (AIN)
11	Samar Amer (EGY)
12	Hannah Reuben (NGR)
13	Divya Kakran (UWW)
14	Anastasiya Zimiankova (AIN)
15	Naigalsürengiin Zagardulam (MGL)
16	Mehtap Gültekin (TUR)
17	Amy Youin (CIV)
18	María Acosta (VEN)
19	Inkara Zhanatayeva (KAZ)
20	Francy Rädelt (GER)
21	Génesis Reasco (ECU)
22	Atzimba Landaverde (MEX)
23	Svetlana Oknazarova (UZB)
24	Đặng Thị Linh (VIE)
25	Baek Ji-min (KOR)
26	Enrica Rinaldi (ITA)
27	Epp Mäe (EST)
28	Kamilė Gaučaitė (LTU)
DQ	Cynthia Vescan (FRA)

Qualified for the 2024 Summer Olympics

- Cynthia Vescan of France originally finished 15th, but was disqualified.
