= 2021 U23 World Wrestling Championships – Women's freestyle 76 kg =

The women's freestyle 76 kilograms is a competition featured at the 2021 U23 World Wrestling Championships, and was held in Belgrade, Serbia on 3 and 4 November.

== Medalists ==
Gold	Aiperi Medet Kyzy (KGZ)
Silver	Tatiana Rentería (COL)
Bronze	Enrica Rinaldi (ITA)
Bronze	Kylie Welker (USA)

== Results ==
Legend

- F — Won by fall

=== Main bracket ===
Round of 16
Diana Vlăsceanu (ROU)	7
Romana Vovchak (UKR)	11
Tatiana Rentería (COL)	8
Enrica Rinaldi (ITA)	1
Evgeniia Zakharchenko (RUS)	5
Kylie Welker (USA)	6
Ayşegül Özbege (TUR)	0
Kamilė Gaučaitė (LTU)	7
Aiperi Medet Kyzy (KGZ)	4^{F}
Génesis Reasco (ECU)	0
Bipasha Dahiya (IND)	6
Bernadett Nagy (HUN)	2

Quarterfinals
Dilnaz Mulkinova (KAZ)	4^{F}
Anđela Prijović (SRB)	0
Romana Vovchak (UKR)	0
Tatiana Rentería (COL)	11
Kylie Welker (USA)	2^{F}
Kamilė Gaučaitė (LTU)	0
Aiperi Medet Kyzy (KGZ)	4^{F}
Bipasha Dahiya (IND)	0

Semifinals
Dilnaz Mulkinova (KAZ)	2
Tatiana Rentería (COL)	2^{F}
Kylie Welker (USA)	0
Aiperi Medet Kyzy (KGZ)	8

Final
Tatiana Rentería (COL)	1
Aiperi Medet Kyzy (KGZ)	3

=== Repechage ===
Repechage round
Enrica Rinaldi (ITA)	8
Romana Vovchak (UKR)	3
Génesis Reasco (ECU)	12
Bipasha Dahiya (IND)	4

Bronze medals
Enrica Rinaldi (ITA)	3^{F}
Dilnaz Mulkinova (KAZ)	0
Génesis Reasco (ECU)	0
Kylie Welker (USA)	6^{F}
