= Tatiana Rentería =

Colombian freestyle wrestler (born 2000)

Personal information
- Full name: Tatiana Rentería Rentería
- Born: 22 December 2000 (age 25) Buenaventura, Valle del Cauca, Colombia

Sport
- Country: Colombia
- Sport: Amateur wrestling
- Weight class: 70 kg; 72 kg; +70 kg; 76 kg
- Events: Freestyle; Beach wrestling
Medal record
Event	1st	2nd	3rd
Olympic Games	0	0	1
World Championships	0	0	1
U23 World Championships	1	1	0
World Beach Games	1	0	0
Pan American Games	0	1	0
Pan American Championships	0	2	0
CAC Games	1	0	0
South American Games	0	0	1
Bolivarian Games	1	0	1
CAC Beach Games	1	0	0
Total	5	4	4
Women's freestyle wrestling
Representing Colombia
Olympic Games
Bronze medal – third place	2024 Paris	76 kg
World Championships
Bronze medal – third place	2023 Belgrade	76 kg
Pan American Games
Silver medal – second place	2023 Santiago	76 kg
Pan American Championships
Silver medal – second place	2023 Buenos Aires	76 kg
Silver medal – second place	2024 Acapulco	76 kg
Central American and Caribbean Games
Gold medal – first place	2023 San Salvador	76 kg
South American Games
Bronze medal – third place	2022 Asunción	76 kg
Bolivarian Games
Gold medal – first place	2022 Valledupar	76 kg
Bronze medal – third place	2025 Lima-Ayacucho	76 kg
U23 World Championships
Gold medal – first place	2022 Pontevedra	76 kg
Silver medal – second place	2021 Belgrade	76 kg
U20 Pan American Championships
Gold medal – first place	2019 Guatemala City	72 kg
Women's beach wrestling
World Beach Games
Gold medal – first place	2019 Doha	70 kg
Central American and Caribbean Beach Games
Gold medal – first place	2022 Santa Marta	+70 kg
South American Beach Games
Gold medal – first place	2023 Santa Marta	+70 kg

Tatiana Rentería Rentería (Note: In this Spanish name, the first or paternal surname is Rentería and the second or maternal family name is Rentería.) (born 22 December 2000) is a Colombian freestyle wrestler. She won one of the bronze medals in the women's 76 kg event at the 2024 Summer Olympics in Paris, France. She won one of the bronze medals in the women's 76 kg event at the 2023 World Wrestling Championships held in Belgrade, Serbia. She won the gold medal in the women's 76 kg event at the 2022 Bolivarian Games held in Valledupar, Colombia.

== Career ==
Rentería represented Colombia at the 2019 World Beach Games in Doha, Qatar and she won the gold medal in the women's 70 kg beach wrestling event. In 2020, she competed at the Pan American Olympic Qualification Tournament held in Ottawa, Canada without qualifying for the 2020 Summer Olympics in Tokyo, Japan. She also failed to qualify for the Olympics at the World Olympic Qualification Tournament held in Sofia, Bulgaria.

At the 2021 U23 World Wrestling Championships held in Belgrade, Serbia, Rentería won the silver medal in the women's 76 kg event. She lost her bronze medal match at the 2022 Pan American Wrestling Championships held in Acapulco, Mexico. She competed in the 76 kg event at the 2022 World Wrestling Championships held in Belgrade, Serbia. She won her first match and she was then eliminated by Martina Kuenz of Austria.

In October 2022, Rentería won the bronze medal in the women's 76 kg event at the 2022 South American Games held in Asunción, Paraguay. In that same month, she won the gold medal in her event at the 2022 U23 World Wrestling Championships held in Pontevedra, Spain. In November 2022, she won the gold medal in her event at the Central American and Caribbean Beach Games held in Santa Marta, Colombia.

Rentería won the silver medal in her event at the 2023 Pan American Wrestling Championships held in Buenos Aires, Argentina. She also won the gold medal in her event at the 2023 Central American and Caribbean Games held in San Salvador, El Salvador. Rentería won one of the bronze medals in the women's 76 kg event at the 2023 World Wrestling Championships held in Belgrade, Serbia. She defeated Cătălina Axente of Romania in her bronze medal match. Rentería also earned a quota place for Colombia for the 2024 Summer Olympics in Paris, France.

Rentería won the silver medal in the women's 76 kg event at the 2023 Pan American Games held in Santiago, Chile. In the final, she lost against Milaimys Marín of Cuba. In 2024, she won the silver medal in her event at the Pan American Wrestling Championships held in Acapulco, Mexico.

Rentería won one of the bronze medals in the women's 76 kg event at the 2024 Summer Olympics. She defeated Génesis Reasco of Ecuador in her bronze medal match.

== Achievements ==
Year	Tournament	Location	Result	Event
Representing Colombia
2019	U20 Pan American Championships	Guatemala City, Guatemala	1st	Freestyle 72 kg
2019	World Beach Games	Doha, Qatar	1st	Beach wrestling 70 kg
2021	U23 World Championships	Belgrade, Serbia	2nd	Freestyle 76 kg
2022	Bolivarian Games	Valledupar, Colombia	1st	Freestyle 76 kg
2022	South American Games	Asunción, Paraguay	3rd	Freestyle 76 kg
2022	U23 World Championships	Pontevedra, Spain	1st	Freestyle 76 kg
2022	Central American and Caribbean Beach Games	Santa Marta, Colombia	1st	Beach wrestling +70 kg
2023	Pan American Championships	Buenos Aires, Argentina	2nd	Freestyle 76 kg
2023	Central American and Caribbean Games	San Salvador, El Salvador	1st	Freestyle 76 kg
2023	South American Beach Games	Santa Marta, Colombia	1st	Beach wrestling +70 kg
2023	World Championships	Belgrade, Serbia	3rd	Freestyle 76 kg
2023	Pan American Games	Santiago, Chile	2nd	Freestyle 76 kg
2024	Pan American Championships	Acapulco, Mexico	2nd	Freestyle 76 kg
2024	Olympic Games	Paris, France	3rd	Freestyle 76 kg
2025	Bolivarian Games	Lima, Peru	3rd	Freestyle 76 kg
