= 2017 U23 World Wrestling Championships =

- Host city: Bydgoszcz, Poland
- Dates: November 21–26
- Stadium: Artego Arena

Champions
- Freestyle: Russia
- Greco-Roman: Georgia
- Women: Japan

The 2017 U23 World Wrestling Championships were the inaugural edition of the U23 World Wrestling Championships of combined events, and was held from November 21 to 26 in Bydgoszcz, Poland.

== Medal table ==
Rank	Nation	Gold	Silver	Bronze	Total
1	Japan (JPN)	8	1	0	9
2	Russia (RUS)	5	3	3	11
3	Turkey (TUR)	3	0	5	8
4	Georgia (GEO)	2	3	3	8
5	Hungary (HUN)	1	1	0	2
6	Iran (IRI)	1	0	5	6
7	United States (USA)	1	0	2	3
8	Cuba (CUB)	1	0	1	2
9	France (FRA)	1	0	0	1
9	Moldova (MDA)	1	0	0	1
11	India (IND)	0	3	0	3
12	Kazakhstan (KAZ)	0	2	1	3
13	Belarus (BLR)	0	2	0	2
13	Canada (CAN)	0	2	0	2
15	Ukraine (UKR)	0	1	7	8
16	China (CHN)	0	1	3	4
17	Mongolia (MGL)	0	1	2	3
18	Bulgaria (BUL)	0	1	1	2
18	Finland (FIN)	0	1	1	2
20	Croatia (CRO)	0	1	0	1
20	Slovakia (SVK)	0	1	0	1
22	Azerbaijan (AZE)	0	0	5	5
23	Germany (GER)	0	0	2	2
23	Lithuania (LTU)	0	0	2	2
23	Sweden (SWE)	0	0	2	2
26	Czech Republic (CZE)	0	0	1	1
26	Israel (ISR)	0	0	1	1
26	Kyrgyzstan (KGZ)	0	0	1	1
Totals (28 entries)		24	24	48	96

== Team ranking ==
Rank	Men's freestyle		Men's Greco-Roman		Women's freestyle	
Rank	Team	Points	Team	Points	Team	Points
1	Russia	55	Georgia	51	Japan	75
2	Kazakhstan	41	Russia	50	Ukraine	47
3	Georgia	36	Turkey	42	Russia	34
4	United States	33	Iran	34	Mongolia	30
5	Ukraine	33	Azerbaijan	27	Azerbaijan	27
6	Belarus	32	Hungary	26	China	26
7	Turkey	30	Kazakhstan	23	Turkey	25
8	Iran	28	Finland	20	India	24
9	India	24	Japan	19	Canada	22
10	Japan	23	Belarus	18	Belarus	20

== Medal summary ==
=== Men's freestyle ===
Event	Gold	Silver	Bronze
57 kg	Reineri Andreu; Cuba	Mikyay Naim; Bulgaria	Süleyman Atlı; Turkey
57 kg	Reineri Andreu; Cuba	Mikyay Naim; Bulgaria	Parviz Ibrahimov; Azerbaijan
61 kg	Rinya Nakamura; Japan	Kuat Amirtayev; Kazakhstan	Islam Dudaev; Russia
61 kg	Rinya Nakamura; Japan	Kuat Amirtayev; Kazakhstan	Sedat Özdemir; Turkey
65 kg	Nachyn Kuular; Russia	Bajrang Punia; India	Younes Emami; Iran
65 kg	Nachyn Kuular; Russia	Bajrang Punia; India	Joseph McKenna; United States
70 kg	Richard Anthony Lewis; United States	Vinod Kumar Omprakash; India	Mirza Skhulukhia; Georgia
70 kg	Richard Anthony Lewis; United States	Vinod Kumar Omprakash; India	Muhammet Akdeniz; Turkey
74 kg	Gadzhi Nabiev; Russia	Achsarbek Gulajev; Slovakia	Avtandil Kentchadze; Georgia
74 kg	Gadzhi Nabiev; Russia	Achsarbek Gulajev; Slovakia	Vasyl Mykhailov; Ukraine
86 kg	Alikhan Zhabrailov; Russia	Azamat Dauletbekov; Kazakhstan	Uri Kalashnikov; Israel
86 kg	Alikhan Zhabrailov; Russia	Azamat Dauletbekov; Kazakhstan	Irakli Mtsituri; Georgia
97 kg	Mojtaba Goleij; Iran	Dzianis Khramiankou; Belarus	Ty Ryan Jack Walz; United States
97 kg	Mojtaba Goleij; Iran	Dzianis Khramiankou; Belarus	Murazi Mchedlidze; Ukraine
125 kg	Geno Petriashvili; Georgia	Magomedamin Dibirov; Russia	Danylo Kartavyi; Ukraine
125 kg	Geno Petriashvili; Georgia	Magomedamin Dibirov; Russia	Amin Taheri; Iran

=== Men's Greco-Roman ===
Event	Gold	Silver	Bronze
59 kg	Masuto Kawana; Japan	Sergey Emelin; Russia	Sakit Guliyev; Azerbaijan
59 kg	Masuto Kawana; Japan	Sergey Emelin; Russia	Aidos Sultangali; Kazakhstan
66 kg	Shmagi Bolkvadze; Georgia	Alen Mirzoian; Russia	Zhang Gaoquan; China
66 kg	Shmagi Bolkvadze; Georgia	Alen Mirzoian; Russia	Amin Kaviya; Iran
71 kg	Daniel Cataraga; Moldova	Robert Fritsch; Hungary	Farshad Belfakeh; Iran
71 kg	Daniel Cataraga; Moldova	Robert Fritsch; Hungary	Murat Dağ; Turkey
75 kg	Fatih Cengiz; Turkey	Gela Bolkvadze; Georgia	Payam Bouyeri; Iran
75 kg	Fatih Cengiz; Turkey	Gela Bolkvadze; Georgia	Esen Asanov; Kyrgyzstan
80 kg	Burhan Akbudak; Turkey	Lasha Gobadze; Georgia	Andrii Antoniuk; Ukraine
80 kg	Burhan Akbudak; Turkey	Lasha Gobadze; Georgia	Rosian Dermanski; Bulgaria
85 kg	Erik Szilvássy; Hungary	Ivan Huklek; Croatia	Toni Metsomaeki; Finland
85 kg	Erik Szilvássy; Hungary	Ivan Huklek; Croatia	Islam Abbasov; Azerbaijan
98 kg	Aleksandr Golovin; Russia	Elias Kuosmanen; Finland	Fatih Başköy; Turkey
98 kg	Aleksandr Golovin; Russia	Elias Kuosmanen; Finland	Abudourexiti Alimujiang; China
130 kg	Sergey Semenov; Russia	Zviadi Pataridze; Georgia	Jello Krahmer; Germany
130 kg	Sergey Semenov; Russia	Zviadi Pataridze; Georgia	Mantas Knystautas; Lithuania

=== Women's freestyle ===
Event	Gold	Silver	Bronze
48 kg	Evin Demirhan; Turkey	Ritu Phogat; India	Jiang Zhu; China
48 kg	Evin Demirhan; Turkey	Ritu Phogat; India	Turkan Nasirova; Azerbaijan
53 kg	Miho Igarashi; Japan	Zhang Qi; China	Ganbaataryn Otgonjargal; Mongolia
53 kg	Miho Igarashi; Japan	Zhang Qi; China	Ekaterina Poleshchuk; Russia
55 kg	Haruna Okuno; Japan	Iryna Kurachkina; Belarus	Nina Menkenova; Russia
55 kg	Haruna Okuno; Japan	Iryna Kurachkina; Belarus	Alina Akobiia; Ukraine
58 kg	Yuzuru Kumano; Japan	Altantsetsegiin Battsetseg; Mongolia	Tetyana Kit; Ukraine
58 kg	Yuzuru Kumano; Japan	Altantsetsegiin Battsetseg; Mongolia	Elin Nilsson; Sweden
60 kg	Yui Sakano; Japan	Ilona Prokopevniuk; Ukraine	Tetiana Omelchenko; Azerbaijan
60 kg	Yui Sakano; Japan	Ilona Prokopevniuk; Ukraine	Enkhbatyn Gantuyaa; Mongolia
63 kg	Ayana Gempei; Japan	Braxton Stone; Canada	Moa Nygren; Sweden
63 kg	Ayana Gempei; Japan	Braxton Stone; Canada	Adéla Hanzlíčková; Czech Republic
69 kg	Koumba Larroque; France	Naruha Matsuyuki; Japan	Danutė Domikaitytė; Lithuania
69 kg	Koumba Larroque; France	Naruha Matsuyuki; Japan	Yudaris Sánchez; Cuba
75 kg	Yasuha Matsuyuki; Japan	Gracelynn Doogan; Canada	Anastasiia Shustova; Ukraine
75 kg	Yasuha Matsuyuki; Japan	Gracelynn Doogan; Canada	Francy Rädelt; Germany
