= Marion Bye =

Norwegian freestyle wrestler

Personal information
- Full name: Marion Brilliantes Bye
- Born: 21 August 2001 (age 24) Norway
- Height: 1.70 m (5 ft 7 in)
- Weight: 76 kg (168 lb; 12.0 st)

Sport
- Country: Norway
- Sport: Women's freestyle wrestling
- Event: 76 kg
Medal record
Women's freestyle wrestling
Representing Norway
European Championships
Bronze medal – third place	2023 Zagreb	76 kg
Dan Kolov - Nikola Petrov Tournament
Bronze medal – third place	2022 Veliko Tarnovo	76 kg
European U23 Championship
Bronze medal – third place	2022 Plovdiv	76 kg
European Cadets Championships
Bronze medal – third place	2018 Skopje	73 kg

Marion Bye (born 2001) is a Norwegian freestyle wrestler competing in the 76 kg division. She won a bronze medal in her event at the 2023 European Wrestling Championships held in Zagreb, Croatia.

== Career ==
In 2023, she won a bronze medal in the women's freestyle 76 kg event at the 2023 European Wrestling Championships held in Zagreb, Croatia.

== Achievements ==
Year	Tournament	Location	Result	Event
2023	European Championships	Zagreb, Croatia	3rd	Freestyle 76 kg
