= Yuka Kagami =

Japanese freestyle wrestler (born 2001)

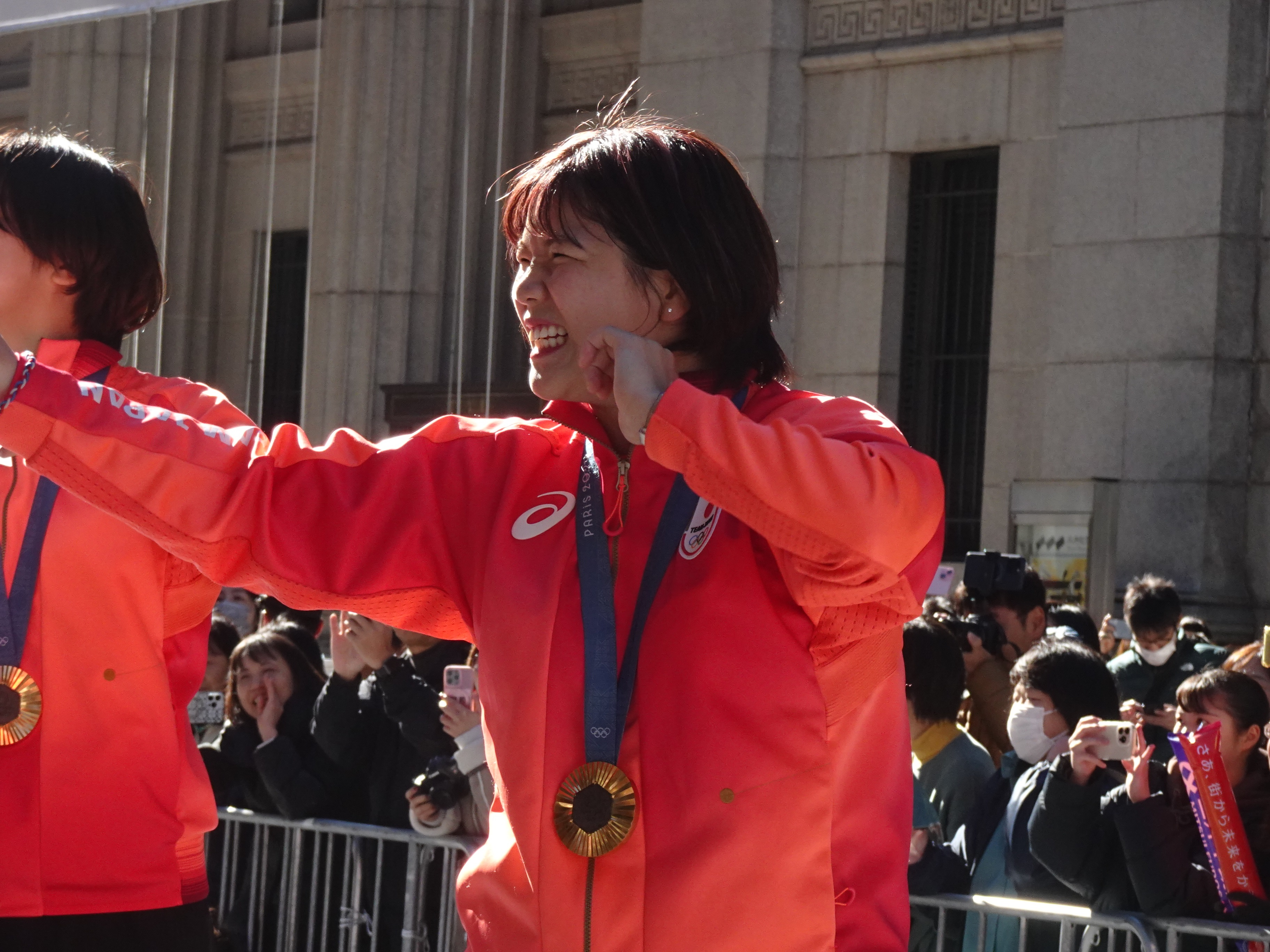
- Kagami at Paris 2024 Summer Olympians and Paralympians Japan National Team parade event on November 30th, 2024

Personal information
- Born: 14 September 2001 (age 25)

Sport
- Country: Japan
- Sport: Amateur wrestling
- Weight class: 76 kg
- Event: Freestyle
Medal record
Women's freestyle wrestling
Representing Japan
Olympic Games
Gold medal – first place	2024 Paris	76 kg
World Championships
Gold medal – first place	2023 Belgrade	76 kg
Bronze medal – third place	2022 Belgrade	76 kg
Asian Games
Gold medal – first place	2026 Aichi-Nagoya	76 kg
Asian Championships
Gold medal – first place	2019 Xi'an	72 kg
Silver medal – second place	2022 Ulaanbaatar	76 kg
World U23 Championships
Silver medal – second place	2019 Budapest	76 kg
Golden Grand Prix Ivan Yarygin
Silver medal – second place	2019 Krasnoyarsk	72 kg
Youth Olympic Games
Bronze medal – third place	2018 Buenos Aires	73 kg

Yuka Kagami (Japanese: 鏡 優翔, Hepburn: Kagami Yūka; born 14 September 2001) is a Japanese freestyle wrestler. She won the gold medal in the women's 76 kg event at the 2024 Summer Olympics in Paris, France. In 2023, she won the gold medal in her event at the World Wrestling Championships held in Belgrade, Serbia. She is a two-time medalist, including gold, at the Asian Wrestling Championships.

== Career ==
Kagami won the bronze medal in the girls' freestyle 73 kg event at the 2018 Summer Youth Olympics held in Buenos Aires, Argentina.

In 2019, at the Golden Grand Prix Ivan Yarygin held in Krasnoyarsk, Russia, she won the silver medal in the women's 72 kg event. In that same year, she also won the gold medal in the women's 72 kg event at the 2019 Asian Wrestling Championships held in Xi'an, China. At the 2019 World U23 Wrestling Championship held in Budapest, Hungary she won the silver medal in the 76 kg event.

Kagami won the silver medal in her event at the 2022 Asian Wrestling Championships held in Ulaanbaatar, Mongolia. She won one of the bronze medals in the women's 76 kg event at the 2022 World Wrestling Championships held in Belgrade, Serbia.

In 2023, Kagami won the gold medal in the women's 76 kg event at the World Wrestling Championships held in Belgrade, Serbia. She defeated Aiperi Medet Kyzy of Kyrgyzstan in her gold medal match. She also earned a quota place for Japan for the 2024 Summer Olympics in Paris, France. Kagami won the gold medal in the women's 76 kg event at the Olympics. She defeated Kennedy Blades of the United States in her gold medal match.

== Achievements ==
Year	Tournament	Location	Result	Event
2019	Asian Championships	Xi'an, China	1st	Freestyle 72 kg
2022	Asian Championships	Ulaanbaatar, Mongolia	2nd	Freestyle 76 kg
2022	World Championships	Belgrade, Serbia	3rd	Freestyle 76 kg
2023	World Championships	Belgrade, Serbia	1st	Freestyle 76 kg
2024	Summer Olympics	Paris, France	1st	Freestyle 76 kg
2026	Asian Games	Aichi and Nagoya, Japan	1st	Freestyle 76 kg
