= 2025 European Wrestling Championships – Women's freestyle 76 kg =

Wrestling competition

Women's freestyle 76 kg at the 2025 European Wrestling Championships
- Venue: X-Bionic Sphere
- Location: Bratislava, Slovakia
- Dates: 9-10 April
- Competitors: 10

Medalists
gold medal	Anastasiya Alpyeyeva	Ukraine
silver medal	Yasemin Adar Yiğit	Turkey
bronze medal	Martina Kuenz	Austria
bronze medal	Anastasiya Zimiankova

The women's freestyle 76 kg is a competition featured at the 2025 European Wrestling Championships, and was held in Bratislava, Slovakia on April 9 and 10.

== Results ==
Legend

- F — Won by fall

=== Main bracket ===
Round of 16
Vanesa Georgieva (BUL)	0
Enrica Rinaldi (ITA)	4
Kamilė Gaučaitė (LTU)	2
Anastasiya Zimiankova (UWW)	4

Quarterfinals
Yasemin Adar Yiğit (TUR)	4^{F}
Enrica Rinaldi (ITA)	0
Martina Kuenz (AUT)	12
Cătălina Axente (ROU)	0
Anastasiya Alpyeyeva (UKR)	4^{F}
Laura Kühn (GER)	0
Anastasiya Zimiankova (UWW)	3
Valeriia Trifonova (UWW)	0

Semifinals
Yasemin Adar Yiğit (TUR)	2
Martina Kuenz (AUT)	1
Anastasiya Alpyeyeva (UKR)	8^{F}
Anastasiya Zimiankova (UWW)	0

Final
Yasemin Adar Yiğit (TUR)	0
Anastasiya Alpyeyeva (UKR)	6

=== Repechage ===
Bronze medal match
Enrica Rinaldi (ITA)	1
Martina Kuenz (AUT)	4
Laura Kühn (GER)	2
Anastasiya Zimiankova (UWW)	2

== Final standing ==
Rank	Athlete
1st place, gold medalist(s)	Anastasiya Alpyeyeva (UKR)
2nd place, silver medalist(s)	Yasemin Adar Yiğit (TUR)
3rd place, bronze medalist(s)	Martina Kuenz (AUT)
3rd place, bronze medalist(s)	Anastasiya Zimiankova (UWW)
5	Enrica Rinaldi (ITA)
5	Laura Kühn (GER)
7	Kamilė Gaučaitė (LTU)
8	Valeriia Trifonova (UWW)
9	Vanesa Georgieva (BUL)
10	Cătălina Axente (ROU)
