= 2021 U23 World Wrestling Championships – Women's freestyle 72 kg =

The women's freestyle 72 kilograms is a competition featured at the 2021 U23 World Wrestling Championships, and was held in Belgrade, Serbia on 4 and 5 November.

== Medalists ==
Gold	Anastasiya Alpyeyeva; Ukraine
Silver	Kendra Dacher; France
Bronze	Divya Kakran; India
Bronze	Eleni Pjollaj; Italy

== Results ==
Legend

- F — Won by fall

=== Main bracket ===
Round of 16
Larisa Nițu (ROU)	8
Alexia Sherland (CAN)	2
Divya Kakran (IND)	3
Anastasiya Alpyeyeva (UKR)	10
Alexandra Zaitseva (KAZ)	7
Merve Pul (TUR)	0
Zsuzsanna Molnár (SVK)	6
Kornelija Zaicevaitė (LTU)	1
Eleni Pjollaj (ITA)	9^{F}
Zaineb Sghaier (TUN)	0
Lilly Schneider (GER)	0
Kendra Dacher (FRA)	10
Marina Surovtseva (RUS)	1
Anastasiya Zimiankova (BLR)	2

Quarterfinals
Kayla Marano (USA)	11
Larisa Nițu (ROU)	0
Anastasiya Alpyeyeva (UKR)	4^{F}
Alexandra Zaitseva (KAZ)	1
Zsuzsanna Molnár (SVK)	4
Eleni Pjollaj (ITA)	8
Kendra Dacher (FRA)	11
Anastasiya Zimiankova (BLR)	0

Semifinals
Kayla Marano (USA)	0
Anastasiya Alpyeyeva (UKR)	2^{F}
Eleni Pjollaj (ITA)	0
Kendra Dacher (FRA)	4^{F}

Final
Anastasiya Alpyeyeva (UKR)	4
Kendra Dacher (FRA)	1

=== Repechage ===
Repechage round
Divya Kakran (IND)	4^{F}
Alexandra Zaitseva (KAZ)	0
Lilly Schneider (GER)	0
Anastasiya Zimiankova (BLR)	6

Bronze medals
Divya Kakran (IND)	6^{F}
Kayla Marano (USA)	2
Anastasiya Zimiankova (BLR)	0
Eleni Pjollaj (ITA)	11^{F}
