= Génesis Reasco =

Ecuadorian freestyle wrestler (born 1998)

Personal information
- Full name: Génesis Rosangela Reasco Valdez
- Born: 18 July 1998 (age 28) Manabí, Ecuador

Sport
- Country: Ecuador
- Sport: Amateur wrestling
- Weight class: 76 kg
- Event: Freestyle
Medal record
Women's freestyle wrestling
Representing Ecuador
World Championships
Gold medal – first place	2025 Zagreb	76 kg
Pan American Championships
Gold medal – first place	2024 Acapulco	76 kg
Silver medal – second place	2019 Buenos Aires	76 kg
Silver medal – second place	2021 Guatemala City	76 kg
Silver medal – second place	2022 Acapulco	76 kg
Silver medal – second place	2026 Coralville	76 kg
Bronze medal – third place	2023 Buenos Aires	76 kg
Bronze medal – third place	2025 Monterrey	76 kg
Pan American Games
Bronze medal – third place	2023 Santiago	76 kg
South American Games
Gold medal – first place	2022 Asunción	76 kg
Bolivarian Games
Silver medal – second place	2022 Valledupar	76 kg
Grand Prix
Gold medal – first place	2025 Madrid	76 kg
Silver medal – second place	2026 Tirana	76 kg
Bronze medal – third place	2024 Budapest	76 kg

Génesis Reasco (Note: In this Spanish name, the first or paternal surname is Reasco and the second or maternal family name is Valdez.) (born 18 July 1998) is an Ecuadorian freestyle wrestler. She won the gold medal in the women's 76 kg event at the 2025 World Wrestling Championships held in Zagreb, Croatia. She also won the gold medal in the women's 76 kg event at the 2022 South American Games held in Asunción, Paraguay.

Reasco won the silver medal in her event at the 2022 Bolivarian Games held in Valledupar, Colombia. Reasco is also a seven-time medalist, including gold, at the Pan American Wrestling Championships.

== Career ==
Reasco competed in the women's 76 kg event at the 2019 Pan American Games held in Lima, Peru. In 2020, she competed at the Pan American Wrestling Olympic Qualification Tournament held in Ottawa, Canada without qualifying for the 2020 Summer Olympics in Tokyo, Japan. She also failed to qualify for the Olympics at the World Olympic Qualification Tournament held in Sofia, Bulgaria.

Reasco won the silver medal in the women's 76 kg event at the 2021 Pan American Wrestling Championships held in Guatemala City, Guatemala. At the 2021 U23 World Wrestling Championships held in Belgrade, Serbia, she lost her bronze medal match in the women's 76 kg event. She also lost her bronze medal match in the women's 76 kg event at the 2022 World Wrestling Championships held in Belgrade, Serbia.

Reasco won the gold medal in her event at the 2022 South American Games held in Asunción, Paraguay. She defeated María Acosta of Venezuela in her gold medal match.

Reasco won one of the bronze medals in the women's 76 kg event at the 2023 Pan American Wrestling Championships held in Buenos Aires, Argentina. She was eliminated in her first match in the 76 kg event at the 2023 World Wrestling Championships held in Belgrade, Serbia. Reasco won one of the bronze medals in her event at the 2023 Pan American Games held in Santiago, Chile.

In 2024, Reasco won the gold medal in her event at the Pan American Wrestling Championships held in Acapulco, Mexico. She defeated Tatiana Rentería of Colombia in her gold medal match. A few days later, at the Pan American Wrestling Olympic Qualification Tournament held in Acapulco, Mexico, she earned a quota place for Ecuador for the 2024 Summer Olympics held in Paris, France. She defeated Emelyn Bautista of the Dominican Republic and she then secured the quota place by defeating María Acosta of Venezuela. Reasco lost her bronze medal match in the women's 76 kg event at the Olympics.

== Achievements ==
Year	Tournament	Location	Result	Event
2019	Pan American Wrestling Championships	Buenos Aires, Argentina	2nd	Freestyle 76 kg
2021	Pan American Wrestling Championships	Guatemala City, Guatemala	2nd	Freestyle 76 kg
2022	Pan American Wrestling Championships	Acapulco, Mexico	2nd	Freestyle 76 kg
2022	Bolivarian Games	Valledupar, Colombia	2nd	Freestyle 76 kg
2022	South American Games	Asunción, Paraguay	1st	Freestyle 76 kg
2023	Pan American Wrestling Championships	Buenos Aires, Argentina	3rd	Freestyle 76 kg
2023	Pan American Games	Santiago, Chile	3rd	Freestyle 76 kg
2024	Pan American Wrestling Championships	Acapulco, Mexico	1st	Freestyle 76 kg
2025	Pan American Wrestling Championships	Monterrey, Mexico	3rd	Freestyle 76 kg
2025	World Championships	Zagreb, Croatia	1st	Freestyle 76 kg
2026	Pan American Wrestling Championships	Coralville, United States	2nd	Freestyle 76 kg
