= 2022 European Wrestling Championships – Women's freestyle 76 kg =

Wrestling competition

Women's freestyle 76 kg at the 2022 European Wrestling Championships
- Venue: BOK Sports Hall
- Location: Budapest, Hungary
- Dates: 30-31 March
- Competitors: 12

Medalists
gold medal	Yasemin Adar	Turkey
silver medal	Epp Mäe	Estonia
bronze medal	Enrica Rinaldi	Italy
bronze medal	Bernadett Nagy	Hungary

The women's freestyle 76 kg was a competition featured at the 2022 European Wrestling Championships, and was held in Budapest, Hungary on March 30 and 31.

== Results ==
Legend

- F — Won by fall
- WO — Won by walkover

=== Main Bracket ===
1/8 finals
Enrica Rinaldi (ITA)	4^{F}
Fanni Nađ (SRB)	0
Cătălina Axente (ROU)	WO
~~Georgina Nelthorpe (GBR)~~
Martina Kuenz (AUT)	2
Bernadett Nagy (HUN)	4
Mariya Oryashkova (BUL)	8^{F}
Romana Vovchak (UKR)	2

Quarterfinals
Epp Mäe (EST)	6^{F}
Enrica Rinaldi (ITA)	0
Cătălina Axente (ROU)	2
Kamilė Gaučaitė (LTU)	1
Francy Rädelt (GER)	2
Bernadett Nagy (HUN)	9^{F}
Mariya Oryashkova (BUL)	0
Yasemin Adar (TUR)	10

Semifinals
Epp Mäe (EST)	10
Cătălina Axente (ROU)	0
Bernadett Nagy (HUN)	0
Yasemin Adar (TUR)	2^{F}

Final
Epp Mäe (EST)	1
Yasemin Adar (TUR)	3

=== Repechage ===
Bronze medal match
Enrica Rinaldi (ITA)	4
Cătălina Axente (ROU)	4
Mariya Oryashkova (BUL)	2
Bernadett Nagy (HUN)	8

== Final standing ==
Rank	Wrestler	UWW Points
1st place, gold medalist(s)	Yasemin Adar (TUR)	10000
2nd place, silver medalist(s)	Epp Mäe (EST)	8000
3rd place, bronze medalist(s)	Enrica Rinaldi (ITA)	6500
3rd place, bronze medalist(s)	Bernadett Nagy (HUN)	6500
5	Cătălina Axente (ROU)	5000
5	Mariya Oryashkova (BUL)	5000
7	Martina Kuenz (AUT)	4400
8	Kamilė Gaučaitė (LTU)	4000
9	Romana Vovchak (UKR)	3500
10	Francy Rädelt (GER)	3100
11	Fanni Nađ (SRB)	1000
12	Georgina Nelthorpe (GBR)	0
