= Alen Mirzoian =

Russian freestyle wrestler

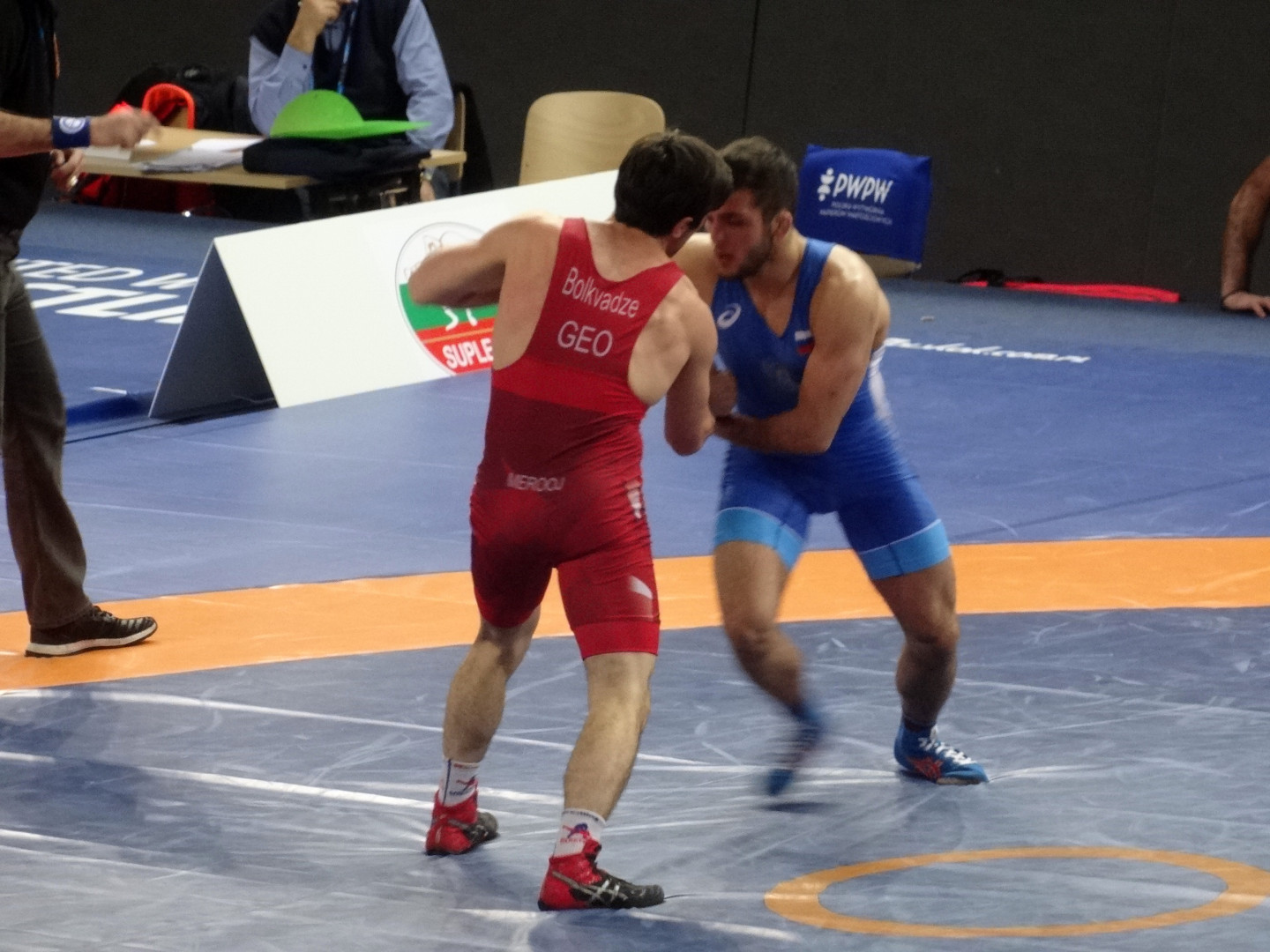
- Alen in blue

Personal information
- Native name: Ален Мирзоян; Ален Арменович Мирзоян
- Full name: Alen Armenovich MameMirzoianov
- Nationality: Russia
- Born: 17 July 1996 (age 30) Nevyansk, Sverdlovsk Oblast, Russia
- Height: 169 cm (5 ft 7 in)

Sport
- Country: Russia
- Sport: Wrestling
- Weight class: 67kg
- Rank: International master of sports
- Event: Greco-Roman
- Club: Verkh-Isetsky WC (Yekaterinburg)
- Coached by: Araik Koyumdzyan
Medal record
Men's freestyle wrestling
Representing Russia
U23 World Championships
Silver medal – second place	2017 Bydgoszcz	66 kg
Bronze medal – third place	2018 Bucharest	67 kg
U23 European Championships
Gold medal – first place	2018 Istanbul	66 kg
Gold medal – first place	2019 Novi Sad	67 kg

Alen Armenovich Mirzoian (Russian: Ален Арменович Мирзоян; born 17 July 1996) is a Russian Greco-Roman wrestler of Armenian ethnicity, who claimed twice the U23 European titles at the 2018 U23 European Wrestling Championships and 2019 U23 European Wrestling Championships. He wrestles at the 67 kg category on the international circuit.

== Sport career ==
In 2017, Alen won the silver medal at 2017 U23 World Wrestling Championships in the men's Greco-Roman 66 kg event. In June 2018, he became U23 European champion at the European U23 Championships held in Turkey in the men's Greco-Roman 67 kg event In November 2018, he competed at U23 World Championships, in semi-final match he lost to Olympic bronze medalist Mohamed Ibrahim El-Sayed of Egypt, but went on to wrestle back and win a bronze medal against Murat Firat of Turkey. In 2019, he came in first at the U23 European Championships again in the men's Greco-Roman 67 kg event.

== Championships and achievements ==
International level

- 2017 U23 World Wrestling Championships — 2nd.
- 2018 U23 World Wrestling Championships — 3nd.
- 2018 U23 European Wrestling Championships — 1st.
- 2019 U23 European Wrestling Championships — 1st.
- 2018 Oleg Karavaev international — 1st.

National level

- 2017 Senior Russian National Championships — 3rd.
- 2019 Senior Russian National Championships — 3rd.
- 2020 Senior Russian National Championships — 2nd.
