= 2020 European Wrestling Championships – Women's freestyle 72 kg =

Competition at the 2020 European Wrestling Championships

The women's freestyle 72 kg is a competition featured at the 2020 European Wrestling Championships, and was held in Rome, Italy on February 13 and February 14.

== Medalists ==
Gold	Natalia Vorobieva; Russia
Silver	Maria Selmaier; Germany
Bronze	Alina Berezhna; Ukraine
Bronze	Cătălina Axente; Romania

== Results ==
Legend

- F — Won by fall

Quarterfinals		Semifinals		Final
Anastasiya Zimiankova (BLR)	0
Alina Berezhna (UKR)	8^{F}	Alina Berezhna (UKR)	2
Merve Pul (TUR)	0	Natalia Vorobieva (RUS)	4
Natalia Vorobieva (RUS)	10			Natalia Vorobieva (RUS)	4^{F}
Enrica Rinaldi (ITA)	0			Maria Selmaier (GER)	1
Maria Selmaier (GER)	6	Maria Selmaier (GER)	8
Kendra Dacher (FRA)	1	Cătălina Axente (ROU)	3
Cătălina Axente (ROU)	3

Bronze medal match
Merve Pul (TUR)	0
Alina Berezhna (UKR)	6^{F}
Enrica Rinaldi (ITA)	1
Cătălina Axente (ROU)	5

== Final standing ==
Rank	Athlete
1st place, gold medalist(s)	Natalia Vorobieva (RUS)
2nd place, silver medalist(s)	Maria Selmaier (GER)
3rd place, bronze medalist(s)	Alina Berezhna (UKR)
3rd place, bronze medalist(s)	Cătălina Axente (ROU)
5	Merve Pul (TUR)
5	Enrica Rinaldi (ITA)
7	Kendra Dacher (FRA)
8	Anastasiya Zimiankova (BLR)
