= 2018 European Wrestling Championships – Women's freestyle 72 kg =

The women's freestyle 72 kg is a competition featured at the 2018 European Wrestling Championships, and was held in Kaspiysk, Russia on May 3 and May 4.

== Medalists ==
Gold	Jenny Fransson; Sweden
Silver	Anastasiya Zimiankova; Belarus
Bronze	Cynthia Vescan; France
Bronze	Alexandra Anghel; Romania

== Results ==
Legend

- F — Won by fall

=== Main Bracket ===
Quarterfinals		Semifinals		Final
Jenny Fransson (SWE)	4^{F}
Cynthia Vescan (FRA)	0	Jenny Fransson (SWE)	8^{F}
Anna Tislichenko (UKR)	3	Beste Altuğ (TUR)	1
Beste Altuğ (TUR)	6			Jenny Fransson (SWE)	9^{F}
Elena Perepelkina (RUS)	6^{F}			Anastasiya Zimiankova (BLR)	2
Agnieszka Wieszczek (POL)	5	Elena Perepelkina (RUS)	5
Alexandra Anghel (ROU)	1	Anastasiya Zimiankova (BLR)	7
Anastasiya Zimiankova (BLR)	7^{F}

=== Repechage ===
Bronze medal match
Cynthia Vescan (FRA)	8^{F}
Beste Altuğ (TUR)	1
Alexandra Anghel (ROU)	2^{F}
Elena Perepelkina (RUS)	4
