= Wrestling at the 2019 European Games – Women's freestyle 76 kg =

Women's freestyle 76kg at the 2019 European Games
- Venue: Minsk Sports Palace
- Date: 27 June and 28 June
- Competitors: 16 from 16 nations

Medalists
gold medal	Vasilisa Marzaliuk	Belarus
silver medal	Francy Rädelt	Germany
bronze medal	Iselin Moen Solheim	Norway
bronze medal	Epp Mäe	Estonia

The women's freestyle 76 kilograms wrestling competition at the 2019 European Games in Minsk was held on 27 to 28 June 2019 at the Minsk Sports Palace.

== Schedule ==
All times are in FET (UTC+03:00)

Date	Time	Event
Thursday, 27 June 2019	12:40	1/8 finals
Thursday, 27 June 2019	13:50	Quarterfinals
Thursday, 27 June 2019	18:30	Semifinals
Friday, 28 June 2019	11:20	Repechage
Friday, 28 June 2019	19:50	Finals

== Results ==
Legend

- F — Won by fall

=== Main bracket ===
1/8 finals
Georgina Nelthorpe (GBR)	2^{F}
Daria Osocka (POL)	5
Aikaterini Pitsiava (GRE)	0
Sabira Aliyeva (AZE)	9
Iselin Moen Solheim (NOR)	2
Francy Rädelt (GER)	12
Ayşegül Özbege (TUR)	2
Cătălina Axente (ROU)	2
Mariya Oryashkova (BUL)	0
Alla Belinska (UKR)	10
Epp Mäe (EST)	3
Zsanett Németh (HUN)	0
Martina Kuenz (AUT)	10
Kamilė Gaučaitė (LTU)	0
Natalia Vorobieva (RUS)	1
Vasilisa Marzaliuk (BLR)	2

Quarterfinals
Georgina Nelthorpe (GBR)	2
Sabira Aliyeva (AZE)	8
Francy Rädelt (GER)	7
Ayşegül Özbege (TUR)	0
Alla Belinska (UKR)	0
Epp Mäe (EST)	8
Martina Kuenz (AUT)	2
Vasilisa Marzaliuk (BLR)	3

Semifinals
Sabira Aliyeva (AZE)	1
Francy Rädelt (GER)	11
Epp Mäe (EST)	3
Vasilisa Marzaliuk (BLR)	5

Final
Francy Rädelt (GER)	0
Vasilisa Marzaliuk (BLR)	9

=== Repechage ===
Repechage round 1
Iselin Moen Solheim (NOR)	4^{F}
Ayşegül Özbege (TUR)	0
Natalia Vorobieva (RUS)	17
Martina Kuenz (AUT)	6

Bronze medals
Iselin Moen Solheim (NOR)	2^{F}
Sabira Aliyeva (AZE)	0
Natalia Vorobieva (RUS)	3
Epp Mäe (EST)	5
