= Francy Rädelt =

German freestyle wrestler (born 1996)

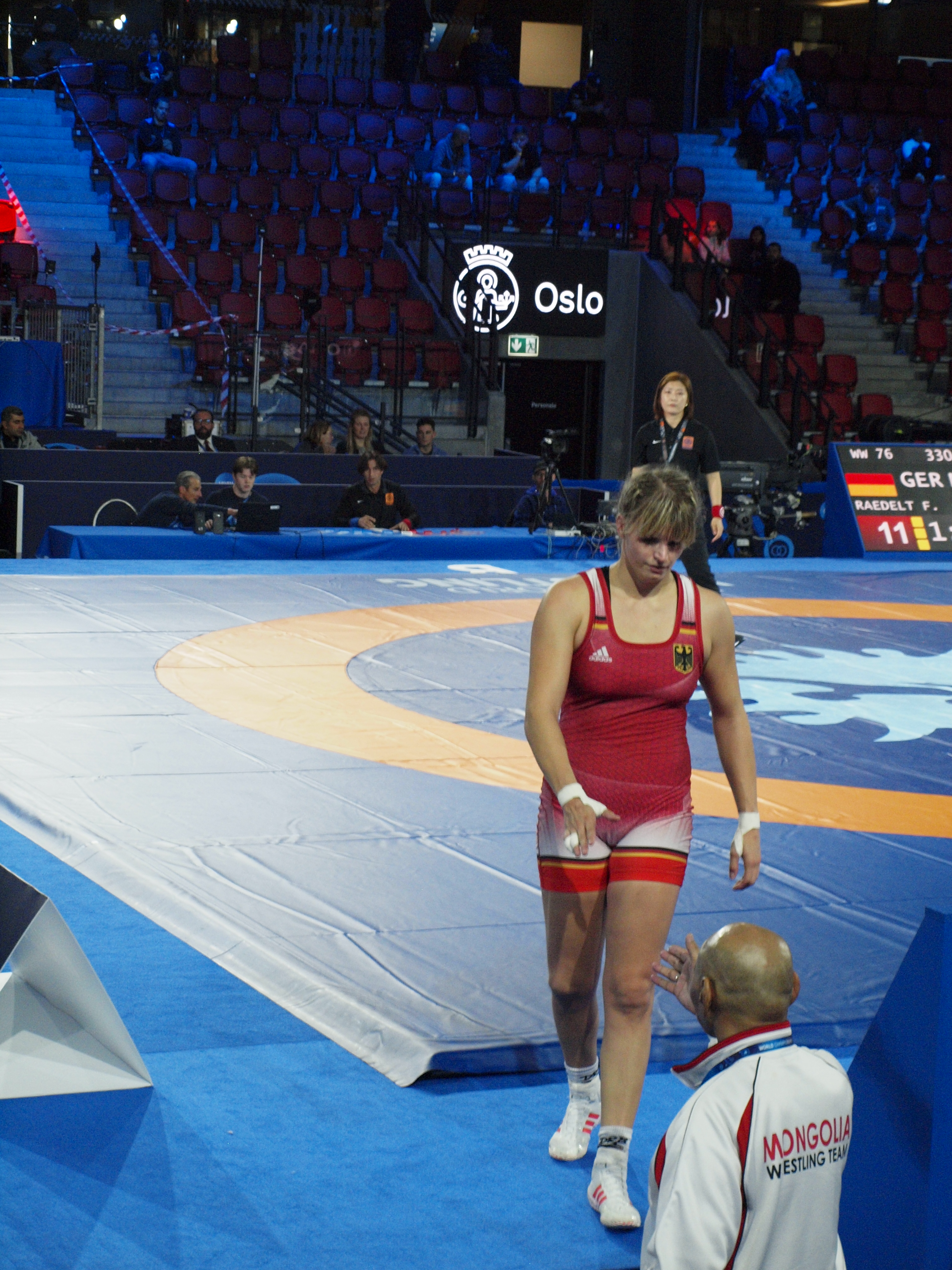
- Rädelt in 2021

Personal information
- Born: 15 May 1996 (age 30)
- Height: 176 cm (5 ft 9 in)

Sport
- Country: Germany
- Sport: Amateur wrestling
- Weight class: 76 kg
- Event: Freestyle
Medal record
Women's freestyle wrestling
Representing Germany
European Games
Silver medal – second place	2019 Minsk	76 kg
Yasar Dogu Tournament
Gold medal – first place	2021 Istanbul	76 kg
Bronze medal – third place	2022 Istanbul	76 kg
World U23 Championships
Bronze medal – third place	2017 Bydgoszcz	75 kg
European U23 Championships
Bronze medal – third place	2017 Szombathely	75 kg

Francy Rädelt, also written as Francy Raedelt (born 15 May 1996), is a German freestyle wrestler. She won the silver medal in the women's 76 kg event at the 2019 European Games held in Minsk, Belarus.

== Career ==
In 2018, Rädelt lost her bronze medal match in the women's 76 kg event at the European U23 Wrestling Championship held in Istanbul, Turkey. In 2021, she competed in the women's 76 kg event at the World Wrestling Championships held in Oslo, Norway where she was eliminated in her first match.

In 2022, Rädelt won one of the bronze medals in the women's 76 kg event at the Yasar Dogu Tournament held in Istanbul, Turkey. She competed in the 76 kg event at the 2022 European Wrestling Championships held in Budapest, Hungary where she was eliminated in her first match.

A few months later, Rädelt competed at the Matteo Pellicone Ranking Series 2022 held in Rome, Italy. She was eliminated in her first match in the 76 kg event at the 2022 World Wrestling Championships held in Belgrade, Serbia.

Rädelt won one of the bronze medals in the women's 76 kg event at the Grand Prix de France Henri Deglane 2023 held in Nice, France. She was eliminated in her first match in the 76 kg event at the 2023 World Wrestling Championships held in Belgrade, Serbia.

Rädelt competed in the 76 kg event at the 2024 European Wrestling Championships held in Bucharest, Romania. She competed at the 2024 European Wrestling Olympic Qualification Tournament in Baku, Azerbaijan hoping to qualify for the 2024 Summer Olympics in Paris, France. She was eliminated in her first match and she did not qualify for the Olympics. Rädelt also competed at the 2024 World Wrestling Olympic Qualification Tournament held in Istanbul, Turkey without qualifying for the Olympics. She was eliminated in her third match.

== Achievements ==
Year	Tournament	Location	Result	Event
2019	European Games	Minsk, Belarus	2nd	Freestyle 76 kg
