= Bernadett Nagy =

Hungarian freestyle wrestler

Personal information
- Born: 19 November 2000 (age 25) Budapest, Hungary
- Height: 1.70 m (5 ft 7 in)
- Weight: 76 kg (168 lb)

Sport
- Country: Hungary
- Sport: Women's freestyle wrestling
- Event: 76 kg
Medal record
Women's freestyle wrestling
Representing Hungary
European Championships
Bronze medal – third place	2022 Budapest	76 kg
Bronze medal – third place	2024 Bucharest	76 kg
European U23 Championship
Gold medal – first place	2022 Plovdiv	76 kg
World Juniors Championships
Bronze medal – third place	2019 Tallinn	76 kg
European Juniors Championships
Gold medal – first place	2019 Pontevedra	76 kg

Bernadett Nagy (born 19 November 2000) is a Hungarian freestyle wrestler competing in the 76 kg division. She is a two-time bronze medalist at the European Wrestling Championships.

== Career ==
In 2024, she won one of bronze medal in the women's freestyle 76 kg event at the European Wrestling Championships held in Bucharest, Romania. She defeated Pauline Lecarpentier of France in her bronze medal match.

She competed at the 2024 European Wrestling Olympic Qualification Tournament in Baku, Azerbaijan and she earned a quota place for Hungary for the 2024 Summer Olympics in Paris, France. She competed in the women's 76 kg event at the Olympics. competed at the 2024 Summer Olympics.

== Achievements ==
Year	Tournament	Location	Result	Event
2022	European Championships	Budapest, Hungary	3rd	Freestyle 76 kg
2024	European Championships	Bucharest, Romania	3rd	Freestyle 76 kg
