= Anastasiia Osniach =

Ukrainian wrestler (born 1996)

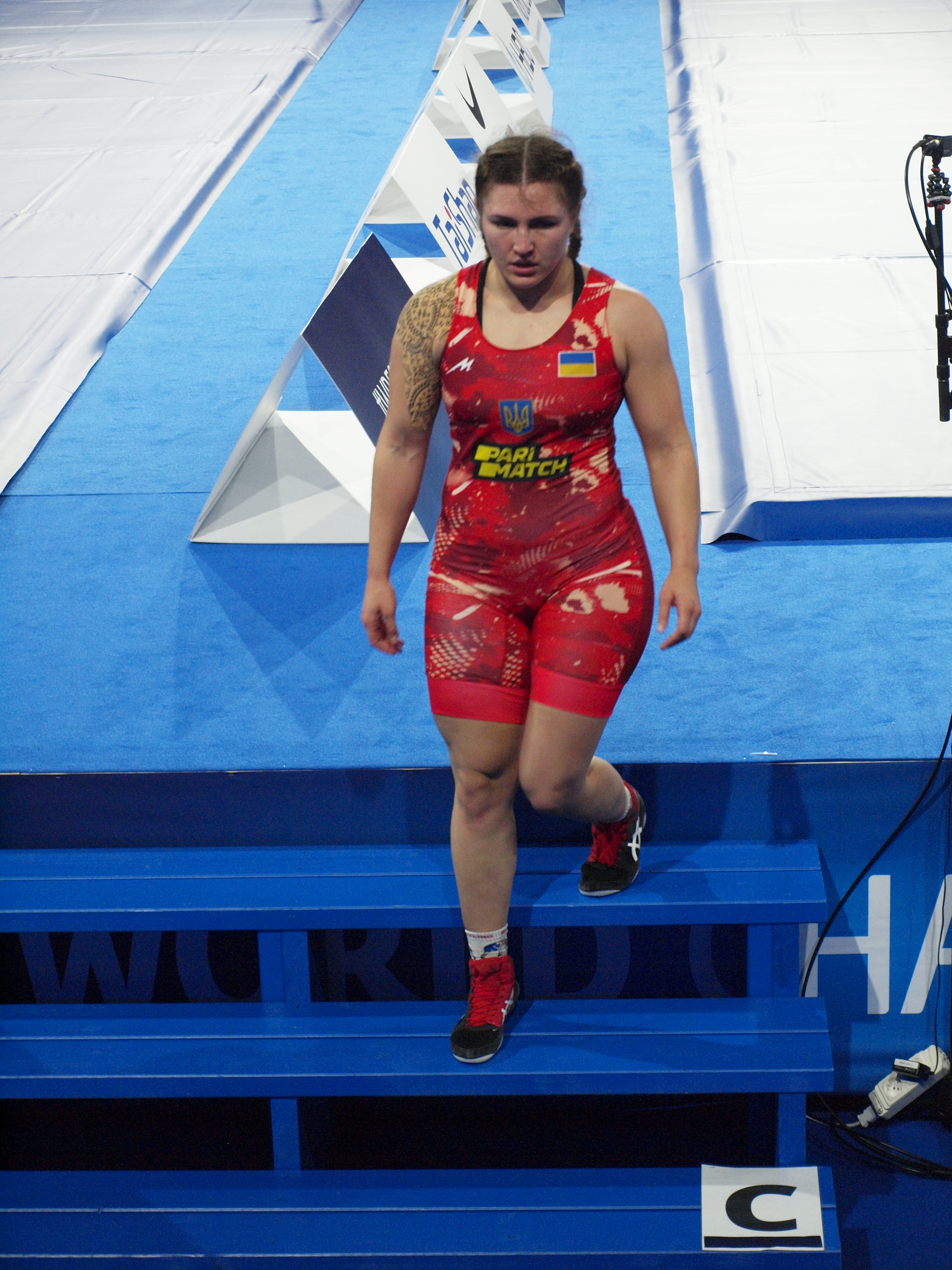
- Anastasiia Osniach at the 2021 World Wrestling Championships in Oslo, Norway

Personal information
- Born: 9 October 1996 (age 29)
- Height: 163 cm (5 ft 4 in)

Sport
- Weight class: 76 kg
- Event: Freestyle
Medal record
Women's freestyle wrestling
Representing Ukraine
European Championships
Silver medal – second place	2024 Bucharest	76 kg
World Cup
Gold medal – first place	2022 Coralville	Team
World U23 Championships
Bronze medal – third place	2017 Bydgoszcz	75 kg
European U23 Championships
Gold medal – first place	2018 Istanbul	76 kg
European Junior Championships
Silver medal – second place	2015 Istanbul	72 kg
Bronze medal – third place	2014 Warsaw	72 kg

Anastasiia Vyacheslavivna Osniach (née Shustova) (Ukrainian: Анастасія В'ячеславівна Осняч (Шустова), born 9 October 1996) is a Ukrainian freestyle wrestler. She is a European Championships silver medallist in 76 kg event.

== Career ==
In 2013, Anastasiia became a world champion of 2013 World Cadets Championships and won a silver medal at the 2013 European Cadets Championships in 70 kg event.

The following year, she represented Ukraine at the 2014 European Juniors Wrestling Championships, held in Warsaw, winning a bronze medal in 72 kg event. At the next European Junior Championships, held in Istanbul, she won a silver medal in 72 kg event, losing Sabira Aliyeva from Azerbaijan in final match.

In 2017, Anastasiia competed at the International Grand Prix for Aleksandre Medved's prizes, held in Minsk, winning a gold medal in 75 kg event. She also became a bronze medalist of 2017 U23 World Wrestling Championships in Bydgoszcz in 75 kg event.

In 2018, Anastasiia competed at the 2018 European U23 Wrestling Championships, held in Istanbul, where she became a European U23 champion in 76 kg event.

In 2019, competing with Ukrainian women's national team, she won a bronze medal in Pro Wrestling League in India.

The following years, competing with Ukrainian women's national team, she won a gold medal at the 2022 Wrestling World Cup in Coralville.

At the 2024 European Wrestling Championships in Bucharest Anastasiia won a silver medal in 76 kg event, losing Yasemin Adar Yiğit from Turkey in final match. She competed at the 2024 European Wrestling Olympic Qualification Tournament in Baku, Azerbaijan hoping to qualify for the 2024 Summer Olympics in Paris, France. She was eliminated in her second match and she did not qualify for the Olympics. She also competed at the 2024 World Wrestling Olympic Qualification Tournament held in Istanbul, Turkey without qualifying for the Olympics.
