= 2024 European Wrestling Olympic Qualification Tournament =

- Venue: National Gymnastics Arena
- Location: Baku, Azerbaijan
- Dates: 5–7 April 2024

The 2024 European Wrestling Olympic Qualification Tournament was the third regional qualifying tournament for the 2024 Summer Olympics. The event was held from 5 to 7 April 2024, in Baku, Azerbaijan.

== Qualification summary ==
NOC	Men's freestyle						Men's Greco-Roman						Women's freestyle						Total
NOC	57	65	74	86	97	125	60	67	77	87	97	130	50	53	57	62	68	76	Total
Azerbaijan	X	X	X	X		X													5
Bulgaria																X			1
Finland									X										1
France								X											1
Georgia		X									X								2
Germany												X			X				2
Hungary																		X	1
Individual Neutral Athletes	X		X	X	XX	X				X		X	X	X	X	X	X		13
Lithuania											X								1
Moldova							X												1
Poland																	X		1
Romania														X					1
Serbia										X									1
Turkey							X		X									X	3
Ukraine								X					X						2
Total:15 NOCs	2	2	2	2	2	2	2	2	2	2	2	2	2	2	2	2	2	2	36

== Men's freestyle ==
=== 57 kg ===
7 April

Round of 16
Vladimir Egorov (MKD)	10
Ilman Mukhtarov (FRA)	0
Süleyman Atlı (TUR)	10
Levan Metreveli (ESP)	0
Simone Piroddu (ITA)	0
Aliabbas Rzazade (AZE)	11
Kamil Kerymov (UKR)	11
Răzvan Kovacs (ROU)	0
Aryan Tsiutryn (AIN)	10
Thomas Epp (SUI)	0

Quarterfinals
Roberti Dingashvili (GEO)	2
Vladimir Egorov (MKD)	3
Süleyman Atlı (TUR)	0
Aliabbas Rzazade (AZE)	6
Georgi Vangelov (BUL)	3^{F}
Kamil Kerymov (UKR)	1
Aryan Tsiutryn (AIN)	10
Horst Lehr (GER)	6

Semifinals
Vladimir Egorov (MKD)	3
Aliabbas Rzazade (AZE)	4
Georgi Vangelov (BUL)	3
Aryan Tsiutryn (AIN)	7

Qualified athletes
Aliabbas Rzazade (AZE)	Q
Aryan Tsiutryn (AIN)	Q

=== 65 kg ===
7 April

Round of 16
Ștefan Coman (ROU)	3
Mikyay Naim (BUL)	4
Erik Arushanian (UKR)	7
Kizhan Clarke (GER)	1
Goderdzi Dzebisashvili (GEO)	4
Nino Leutert (SUI)	1
Haji Aliyev (AZE)	5
Khamzat Arsamerzouev (FRA)	2
Abdullah Toprak (TUR)	6
Niurgun Skriabin (AIN)	16
Islam Dudaev (ALB)	10
Dominik Jagusz (POL)	0
Carlos Álvarez (ESP)	1
Josh Finesilver (ISR)	12

Quarterfinals
Maxim Saculțan (MDA)	5
Mikyay Naim (BUL)	2
Erik Arushanian (UKR)	2
Goderdzi Dzebisashvili (GEO)	2
Haji Aliyev (AZE)	4
Niurgun Skriabin (AIN)	2
Islam Dudaev (ALB)	10
Josh Finesilver (ISR)	0

Semifinals
Maxim Saculțan (MDA)	1
Goderdzi Dzebisashvili (GEO)	2
Haji Aliyev (AZE)	6
Islam Dudaev (ALB)	3

Qualified athletes
Goderdzi Dzebisashvili (GEO)	Q
Haji Aliyev (AZE)	Q

=== 74 kg ===
7 April

Round of 32
Rasul Shapiev (MKD)	2–4	Zurab Kapraev (ROU)
Frank Chamizo (ITA)	10–3	Patryk Ołenczyn (POL)
Malik Amine (SMR)	0–10	Giorgi Elbakidze (GEO)
David Wolf (GER)	0–11	Mahamedkhabib Kadzimahamedau (AIN)
Zelimkhan Khadjiev (FRA)	1–7	Miroslav Kirov (BUL)

Round of 16
Turan Bayramov (AZE)	10
Tobias Portmann (SUI)	0
Zurab Kapraev (ROU)	5
Erik Reinbok (EST)	1
Simon Marchl (AUT)	1
Frank Chamizo (ITA)	7
Giorgi Elbakidze (GEO)	2
Murad Kuramagomedov (HUN)	5
Soner Demirtaş (TUR)	8
Mitch Finesilver (ISR)	0
Mahamedkhabib Kadzimahamedau (AIN)	6
Vasile Diacon (MDA)	3
Ibragim Veliev (BEL)	0
Miroslav Kirov (BUL)	3
Vadym Tsurkan (UKR)	0
Tajmuraz Salkazanov (SVK)	6

Quarterfinals
Turan Bayramov (AZE)	5
Zurab Kapraev (ROU)	1
Frank Chamizo (ITA)	2
Murad Kuramagomedov (HUN)	0
Soner Demirtaş (TUR)	1
Mahamedkhabib Kadzimahamedau (AIN)	6
Miroslav Kirov (BUL)	3
Tajmuraz Salkazanov (SVK)	4

Semifinals
Turan Bayramov (AZE)	8
Frank Chamizo (ITA)	8
Mahamedkhabib Kadzimahamedau (AIN)	4
Tajmuraz Salkazanov (SVK)	2

Qualified athletes
Turan Bayramov (AZE)	Q
Mahamedkhabib Kadzimahamedau (AIN)	Q

=== 86 kg ===
7 April

Round of 32
Matt Finesilver (ISR)	2–7	Ivan Ichizli (MDA)
Aimar Andruse (EST)	0–10	Artur Naifonov (AIN)
Ilya Khamtsou (AIN)	9–11	Sebastian Jezierzański (POL)
Patrik Püspöki (HUN)	0–3	Taimuraz Friev (ESP)
Osman Nurmagomedov (AZE)	11–0	Domantas Pauliuščenko (LTU)

Round of 16
Osman Göçen (TUR)	3
Vladimeri Gamkrelidze (GEO)	9
Ivan Ichizli (MDA)	0
Boris Makoev (SVK)	6
Ivars Samušonoks (LAT)	0
Artur Naifonov (AIN)	10
Sebastian Jezierzański (POL)	0
Dauren Kurugliev (GRE)	2
Rakhim Magamadov (FRA)	11
Aron Caneva (ITA)	0
Taimuraz Friev (ESP)	0
Vasyl Mykhailov (UKR)	5
Samuel Scherrer (SUI)	0
Osman Nurmagomedov (AZE)	5
Joshua Morodion (GER)	2
Magomed Ramazanov (BUL)	7

Quarterfinals
Vladimeri Gamkrelidze (GEO)	6
Boris Makoev (SVK)	0
Artur Naifonov (AIN)	2
Dauren Kurugliev (GRE)	1
Rakhim Magamadov (FRA)	1
Vasyl Mykhailov (UKR)	3
Osman Nurmagomedov (AZE)	6
Magomed Ramazanov (BUL)	2

Semifinals
Vladimeri Gamkrelidze (GEO)	0
Artur Naifonov (AIN)	4
Vasyl Mykhailov (UKR)	1
Osman Nurmagomedov (AZE)	4

Qualified athletes
Artur Naifonov (AIN)	Q
Osman Nurmagomedov (AZE)	Q

=== 97 kg ===
7 April

Round of 16
Ben Honis (ITA)	2
Alikhan Zhabrailov (AIN)	12
Lukas Krasauskas (LTU)	4
Florin Tripon (ROU)	7
Radu Lefter (MDA)	10
Magomedgaji Nurov (MKD)	8
Adlan Viskhanov (FRA)	1
Aliaksandr Hushtyn (AIN)	4

Quarterfinals
Erik Thiele (GER)	0
Alikhan Zhabrailov (AIN)	8
Florin Tripon (ROU)	0
Illia Archaia (UKR)	10
Radosław Baran (POL)	12
Radu Lefter (MDA)	1
Aliaksandr Hushtyn (AIN)	6
Vladislav Baitsaev (HUN)	1

Semifinals
Alikhan Zhabrailov (AIN)	11
Illia Archaia (UKR)	0
Radosław Baran (POL)
Aliaksandr Hushtyn (AIN)	WO

Qualified athletes
Alikhan Zhabrailov (AIN)	Q
Aliaksandr Hushtyn (AIN)	Q

=== 125 kg ===
7 April

Round of 16
Kamil Kościółek (POL)	10
Gheorghe Erhan (MDA)	0
Ralfs Lukins (LAT)	2
Johannes Ludescher (AUT)	13
Gennadij Cudinovic (GER)	2
Alen Khubulov (BUL)	4
Abraham Conyedo (ITA)	4
Paris Karepi (ALB)	0

Quarterfinals
Dániel Ligeti (HUN)	4
Kamil Kościółek (POL)	7
Johannes Ludescher (AUT)	0
Dzianis Khramiankou (AIN)	6
Oleksandr Khotsianivskyi (UKR)	5
Alen Khubulov (BUL)	7
Abraham Conyedo (ITA)	0
Giorgi Meshvildishvili (AZE)	10

Semifinals
Kamil Kościółek (POL)	2
Dzianis Khramiankou (AIN)	9
Alen Khubulov (BUL)	0
Giorgi Meshvildishvili (AZE)	7

Qualified athletes
Dzianis Khramiankou (AIN)	Q
Giorgi Meshvildishvili (AZE)	Q

== Men's Greco-Roman ==
=== 60 kg ===
5 April

Round of 32
Jacopo Sandron (ITA)	0–9	Justas Petravičius (LTU)
Leri Abuladze (GEO)	5–3	Aleksandrs Jurkjans (LAT)
Georgii Tibilov (SRB)	0–9	Enes Başar (TUR)

Round of 16
Victor Ciobanu (MDA)	11
Melkamu Fetene (ISR)	0
Justas Petravičius (LTU)	9
Ilias Zairakis (GRE)	0
Bajram Sina (ALB)	0
Aker Al-Obaidi (AUT)	9
Olivier Skrzypczak (POL)	1
Hleb Makaranka (AIN)	9
Léo Tudezca (FRA)	0
Anvar Allakhiarov (AIN)	10
Leri Abuladze (GEO)	10
Răzvan Arnăut (ROU)	1
Etienne Kinsinger (GER)	3
Enes Başar (TUR)	5
Oleksii Masyk (UKR)	2
Nihat Mammadli (AZE)	5

Quarterfinals
Victor Ciobanu (MDA)	14
Justas Petravičius (LTU)	0
Aker Al-Obaidi (AUT)	5
Hleb Makaranka (AIN)	11
Anvar Allakhiarov (AIN)	4
Leri Abuladze (GEO)	0
Enes Başar (TUR)	3
Nihat Mammadli (AZE)	1

Semifinals
Victor Ciobanu (MDA)	7
Hleb Makaranka (AIN)	1
Anvar Allakhiarov (AIN)	2
Enes Başar (TUR)	5

Qualified athletes
Victor Ciobanu (MDA)	Q
Enes Başar (TUR)	Q

=== 67 kg ===
5 April

Round of 32
Andreas Vetsch (SUI)	0–10	Valentin Petic (MDA)
Andrea Setti (ITA)	0–9	Morten Thoresen (NOR)
Gevorg Sahakyan (POL)	7–1	Arionas Kolitsopoulos (GRE)
Selçuk Can (TUR)	9–6	Kristupas Šleiva (LTU)

Round of 16
István Váncza (HUN)	5
Michael Widmayer (GER)	1
Valentin Petic (MDA)	8
Maksim Nehoda (AIN)	1
Dominik Etlinger (CRO)	0
Morten Thoresen (NOR)	9
Abu Muslim Amaev (BUL)	1
Parviz Nasibov (UKR)	5
Mihai Mihuț (ROU)	2
Diego Chkhikvadze (GEO)	1
Gevorg Sahakyan (POL)	4
Niklas Öhlén (SWE)	1
Ruslan Bichurin (AIN)	7
Selçuk Can (TUR)	10
Matias Lipasti (FIN)	1
Mamadassa Sylla (FRA)	11

Quarterfinals
István Váncza (HUN)	6
Valentin Petic (MDA)	1
Morten Thoresen (NOR)	1
Parviz Nasibov (UKR)	2
Mihai Mihuț (ROU)	0
Gevorg Sahakyan (POL)	9
Selçuk Can (TUR)	1
Mamadassa Sylla (FRA)	8

Semifinals
István Váncza (HUN)	4
Parviz Nasibov (UKR)	5
Gevorg Sahakyan (POL)	3
Mamadassa Sylla (FRA)	3

Qualified athletes
Parviz Nasibov (UKR)	Q
Mamadassa Sylla (FRA)	Q

=== 77 kg ===
5 April

Round of 32
Ibrahim Ghanem (FRA)	1–5	Adlet Tiuliubaev (AIN)
Burhan Akbudak (TUR)	7–4	Riccardo Abbrescia (ITA)
Deni Nakaev (GER)	0–8	Ilie Cojocari (ROU)
Stoyan Kubatov (BUL)	9–0	Oliver Krüger (DEN)
Pavel Liakh (AIN)	7–8	Elmar Nuraliiev (UKR)
Jonni Sarkkinen (FIN)	2–0 Fall	Kevin Kupi (ALB)
Marcos Sánchez-Silva (ESP)	0–9	Albin Olofsson (SWE)

Round of 16
Alexandrin Guțu (MDA)	6
Patryk Bednarz (POL)	0
Adlet Tiuliubaev (AIN)	4
Viktor Nemeš (SRB)	1
Oldřich Varga (CZE)	1
Burhan Akbudak (TUR)	4
Ilie Cojocari (ROU)	1
Antonio Kamenjašević (CRO)	5
Zoltán Lévai (HUN)	1
Stoyan Kubatov (BUL)	1
Elmar Nuraliiev (UKR)	3
Fabio Dietsche (SUI)	1
Per-Anders Kure (NOR)	1
Jonni Sarkkinen (FIN)	1
Albin Olofsson (SWE)	3
Iuri Lomadze (GEO)	1

Quarterfinals
Alexandrin Guțu (MDA)	5
Adlet Tiuliubaev (AIN)	3
Burhan Akbudak (TUR)	8
Antonio Kamenjašević (CRO)	0
Zoltán Lévai (HUN)	6
Elmar Nuraliiev (UKR)	2
Jonni Sarkkinen (FIN)	9
Albin Olofsson (SWE)	1

Semifinals
Alexandrin Guțu (MDA)	8
Burhan Akbudak (TUR)	10
Zoltán Lévai (HUN)	0
Jonni Sarkkinen (FIN)	9

Qualified athletes
Burhan Akbudak (TUR)	Q
Jonni Sarkkinen (FIN)	Q

=== 87 kg ===
5 April

Round of 32
Mihail Bradu (MDA)	4–1	Leon Rivalta (ITA)
Damian von Euw (SUI)	4–14	Waltteri Latvala (FIN)
Marcel Sterkenburg (NED)	1–6	Exauce Mukubu (NOR)
Nicu Ojog (ROU)	10–6	Szymon Szymonowicz (POL)

Round of 16
Islam Abbasov (AZE)	3
Turpal Bisultanov (DEN)	5
Mihail Bradu (MDA)	9
Ilias Pagkalidis (GRE)	1
Hannes Wagner (GER)	6
Waltteri Latvala (FIN)	4
Ivan Huklek (CRO)	5
Aleksandr Komarov (SRB)	7
Alex Kessidis (SWE)	2
Milad Alirzaev (AIN)	4
Exauce Mukubu (NOR)	7
Martynas Nemsevičius (LTU)	0
Gurami Khetsuriani (GEO)	7
Nicu Ojog (ROU)	10
Lukas Staudacher (AUT)	0
Kiryl Maskevich (AIN)	11

Quarterfinals
Turpal Bisultanov (DEN)	9
Mihail Bradu (MDA)	0
Hannes Wagner (GER)	3
Aleksandr Komarov (SRB)	5
Milad Alirzaev (AIN)	10
Exauce Mukubu (NOR)	2
Nicu Ojog (ROU)	1
Kiryl Maskevich (AIN)	10

Semifinals
Turpal Bisultanov (DEN)	0
Aleksandr Komarov (SRB)	8
Milad Alirzaev (AIN)	2
Kiryl Maskevich (AIN)	1

Qualified athletes
Aleksandr Komarov (SRB)	Q
Milad Alirzaev (AIN)	Q

=== 97 kg ===
5 April

Round of 32
Alex Szőke (HUN)	1–1	Nikoloz Kakhelashvili (ITA)
Gerard Kurniczak (POL)	1–1	Tyrone Sterkenburg (NED)

Round of 16
Arvi Savolainen (FIN)	1
Felix Baldauf (NOR)	7
Nikoloz Kakhelashvili (ITA)	1
Roberti Kobliashvili (GEO)	4
Lucas Lazogianis (GER)	1
Magomed Murtazaliev (AIN)	1
Murad Ahmadiyev (AZE)	10
Aleksandar Stjepanetic (SWE)	0
Mikheil Kajaia (SRB)	3
Daniel Gastl (AUT)	1
Michail Iosifidis (GRE)	1
Yevhenii Saveta (UKR)	5
Filip Smetko (CRO)	1
Tyrone Sterkenburg (NED)	2
Doğan Yılmaz (TUR)	1
Mindaugas Venckaitis (LTU)	3

Quarterfinals
Felix Baldauf (NOR)	1
Roberti Kobliashvili (GEO)	3
Lucas Lazogianis (GER)	7
Murad Ahmadiyev (AZE)	5
Mikheil Kajaia (SRB)	4
Yevhenii Saveta (UKR)	1
Tyrone Sterkenburg (NED)	2
Mindaugas Venckaitis (LTU)	3

Semifinals
Roberti Kobliashvili (GEO)	2
Lucas Lazogianis (GER)	1
Mikheil Kajaia (SRB)	2
Mindaugas Venckaitis (LTU)	5

Qualified athletes
Roberti Kobliashvili (GEO)	Q
Mindaugas Venckaitis (LTU)	Q

=== 130 kg ===
5 April

Round of 16
Dárius Vitek (HUN)	1
Jello Krahmer (GER)	3
Sulkhan Buidze (GEO)	2
Oleksandr Chernetskyi (UKR)	1
Elias Kuosmanen (FIN)	1
Alin Alexuc-Ciurariu (ROU)	1
Beka Kandelaki (AZE)	9
Oskar Marvik (NOR)	1
Georgi Ivanov (BUL)	10
Boris Petrušić (SRB)	0
Sergey Semenov (AIN)	4
Dzmitry Zarubski (AIN)	0

Quarterfinals
Romas Fridrikas (LTU)	1
Jello Krahmer (GER)	3
Sulkhan Buidze (GEO)	2
Alin Alexuc-Ciurariu (ROU)	3
Beka Kandelaki (AZE)	9
Georgi Ivanov (BUL)	0
Sergey Semenov (AIN)	1
Heiki Nabi (EST)	1

Semifinals
Jello Krahmer (GER)	6
Alin Alexuc-Ciurariu (ROU)	1
Beka Kandelaki (AZE)	2
Sergey Semenov (AIN)	4

Qualified athletes
Jello Krahmer (GER)	Q
Sergey Semenov (AIN)	Q

== Women's freestyle ==
=== 50 kg ===
6 April

Round of 16
Ana Maria Pîrvu (ROU)	1
Gabija Dilytė (LTU)	2^{F}
Julie Sabatié (FRA)	10
Aintzane Gorría (ESP)	0
Anna Łukasiak (POL)	0
Nadezhda Sokolova (AIN)	7
Emanuela Liuzzi (ITA)	1
Anastasia Blayvas (GER)	4

Quarterfinals
Mariya Stadnik (AZE)	10
Gabija Dilytė (LTU)	0
Julie Sabatié (FRA)	0
Oksana Livach (UKR)	5
Miglena Selishka (BUL)	4
Nadezhda Sokolova (AIN)	5
Anastasia Blayvas (GER)	12
Kseniya Stankevich (AIN)	2

Semifinals
Mariya Stadnik (AZE)	2
Oksana Livach (UKR)	4^{F}
Nadezhda Sokolova (AIN)	12^{F}
Anastasia Blayvas (GER)	2

Qualified athletes
Oksana Livach (UKR)	Q
Nadezhda Sokolova (AIN)	Q

=== 53 kg ===
6 April

Round of 16
Jowita Wrzesień (POL)	3
Annika Wendle (GER)	8^{F}
Veronika Ryabovolova (MKD)	4^{F}
Elnura Mammadova (AZE)	0
Tatiana Debien (FRA)	1
Andreea Ana (ROU)	4
Natalia Malysheva (AIN)	11
Maria Ferone (ITA)	0
Zeynep Yetgil (TUR)	7
Liliia Malanchuk (UKR)	1
Irena Binkova (BUL)	4
Mariana Drăguțan (MDA)	10^{F}

Quarterfinals
Sztalvira Orsós (HUN)	1
Annika Wendle (GER)	2
Veronika Ryabovolova (MKD)	0
Andreea Ana (ROU)	11
Natalia Malysheva (AIN)	11
Zeynep Yetgil (TUR)	0
Mariana Drăguțan (MDA)	6
Maria Prevolaraki (GRE)	6

Semifinals
Annika Wendle (GER)	4
Andreea Ana (ROU)	5
Natalia Malysheva (AIN)	8^{F}
Maria Prevolaraki (GRE)	0

Qualified athletes
Andreea Ana (ROU)	Q
Natalia Malysheva (AIN)	Q

=== 57 kg ===
6 April

Round of 16
Erika Bognár (HUN)	5
Graciela Sánchez (ESP)	0
Sandra Paruszewski (GER)	6
Kateryna Zhydachevska (ROU)	3
Mathilde Rivière (FRA)	0
Evelina Nikolova (BUL)	4
Othelie Høie (NOR)	0
Alina Hrushyna (UKR)	7^{F}
Aurora Russo (ITA)	0
Olga Khoroshavtseva (AIN)	5

Quarterfinals
Elvira Kamaloğlu (TUR)	5
Erika Bognár (HUN)	0
Sandra Paruszewski (GER)	4
Evelina Nikolova (BUL)	2
Zhala Aliyeva (AZE)	0
Alina Hrushyna (UKR)	10
Olga Khoroshavtseva (AIN)	2
Iryna Kurachkina (AIN)	4

Semifinals
Elvira Kamaloğlu (TUR)	2
Sandra Paruszewski (GER)	5^{F}
Alina Hrushyna (UKR)	3
Iryna Kurachkina (AIN)	6

Qualified athletes
Sandra Paruszewski (GER)	Q
Iryna Kurachkina (AIN)	Q

=== 62 kg ===
6 April

Round of 16
Johanna Lindborg (SWE)	4
Enikő Elekes (HUN)	1
Elena Esposito (ITA)	0
Aleksandra Wólczyńska (POL)	4^{F}
Améline Douarre (FRA)	6
Birgul Soltanova (AZE)	4
Mariana Cherdivara (MDA)	8
Kadriye Aksoy (TUR)	1
Anastasija Grigorjeva (LAT)	9
Lydia Pérez (ESP)	0
Kriszta Incze (ROU)	4
Alina Kasabieva (AIN)	4
Viktoria Vesso (EST)	0
Veranika Ivanova (AIN)	2^{F}

Quarterfinals
Bilyana Dudova (BUL)	11
Johanna Lindborg (SWE)	0
Aleksandra Wólczyńska (POL)	2
Améline Douarre (FRA)	6^{F}
Mariana Cherdivara (MDA)	5
Anastasija Grigorjeva (LAT)	1
Alina Kasabieva (AIN)	7
Veranika Ivanova (AIN)	3

Semifinals
Bilyana Dudova (BUL)	3
Améline Douarre (FRA)	0
Mariana Cherdivara (MDA)	1
Alina Kasabieva (AIN)	6

Qualified athletes
Bilyana Dudova (BUL)	Q
Alina Kasabieva (AIN)	Q

=== 68 kg ===
6 April

Round of 16
Tindra Sjöberg (SWE)	3
Alexandra Anghel (ROU)	10
Wiktoria Chołuj (POL)	11
Ilana Kratysh (ISR)	0
Dalma Caneva (ITA)	1
Noémi Szabados (HUN)	3
Hanna Sadchanka (AIN)	7
Eyleen Sewina (GER)	0
Elma Zeidlere (LAT)	0
Khanum Velieva (AIN)	6
Danutė Domikaitytė (LTU)	0
Manola Skobelska (UKR)	2^{F}
Elis Manolova (AZE)	2
Mimi Hristova (BUL)	4

Quarterfinals
Adéla Hanzlíčková (CZE)	6
Alexandra Anghel (ROU)	3
Wiktoria Chołuj (POL)	10
Noémi Szabados (HUN)	0
Hanna Sadchanka (AIN)	0
Khanum Velieva (AIN)	10
Manola Skobelska (UKR)	2^{F}
Mimi Hristova (BUL)	8

Semifinals
Adéla Hanzlíčková (CZE)	2
Wiktoria Chołuj (POL)	3
Khanum Velieva (AIN)	12
Manola Skobelska (UKR)	0

Qualified athletes
Wiktoria Chołuj (POL)	Q
Khanum Velieva (AIN)	Q

=== 76 kg ===
6 April

Round of 16
Kamilė Gaučaitė (LTU)	0
Pauline Lecarpentier (FRA)	2
Enrica Rinaldi (ITA)	0
Bernadett Nagy (HUN)	10
Agoro Papavasileiou (GRE)	0
Anastasiya Zimiankova (AIN)	10^{F}
Anastasiia Osniach (UKR)	14
Vanesa Georgieva (BUL)	8
Martina Kuenz (AUT)	11
Francy Rädelt (GER)	0
Epp Mäe (EST)	1
Yasemin Adar Yiğit (TUR)	12

Quarterfinals
Cătălina Axente (ROU)	3
Pauline Lecarpentier (FRA)	4
Bernadett Nagy (HUN)	3
Anastasiya Zimiankova (AIN)	0
Anastasiia Osniach (UKR)	0
Martina Kuenz (AUT)	10
Yasemin Adar Yiğit (TUR)	11
Rita Talismanova (AIN)	0

Semifinals
Pauline Lecarpentier (FRA)	0
Bernadett Nagy (HUN)	2
Martina Kuenz (AUT)	2
Yasemin Adar Yiğit (TUR)	6

Qualified athletes
Bernadett Nagy (HUN)	Q
Yasemin Adar Yiğit (TUR)	Q

== Controversies ==
Italian wrestler Frank Chamizo stated that he was offered a $300,000 bribe to lose to Azerbaijani wrestler Turan Bayramov, which Chamizo refused. Several of Chamizo's takedowns were not counted by the referee, and the match was tied 8-8 into the final seconds when Chamizo scored a takedown and earned two points. However, the referee overturned the points after Bayramov's coach challenged. This decision was heavily criticized by the Italian Wrestling Federation and other observers, as Bayramov's knees clearly touched the mat. Although the match was tied, Bayramov was declared the winner on criteria, and consequently moved into the finals and qualified for the Olympics. Chamizo accused the referee of match fixing. Two weeks after the tournament, the refereeing body that officiated the match were suspended by the UWW after two independent panels ruled the bout was scored incorrectly. However, due to a policy the result could not be changed after the winner is officially declared.
