= Anastasiya Zimiankova =

Belarusian freestyle wrestler

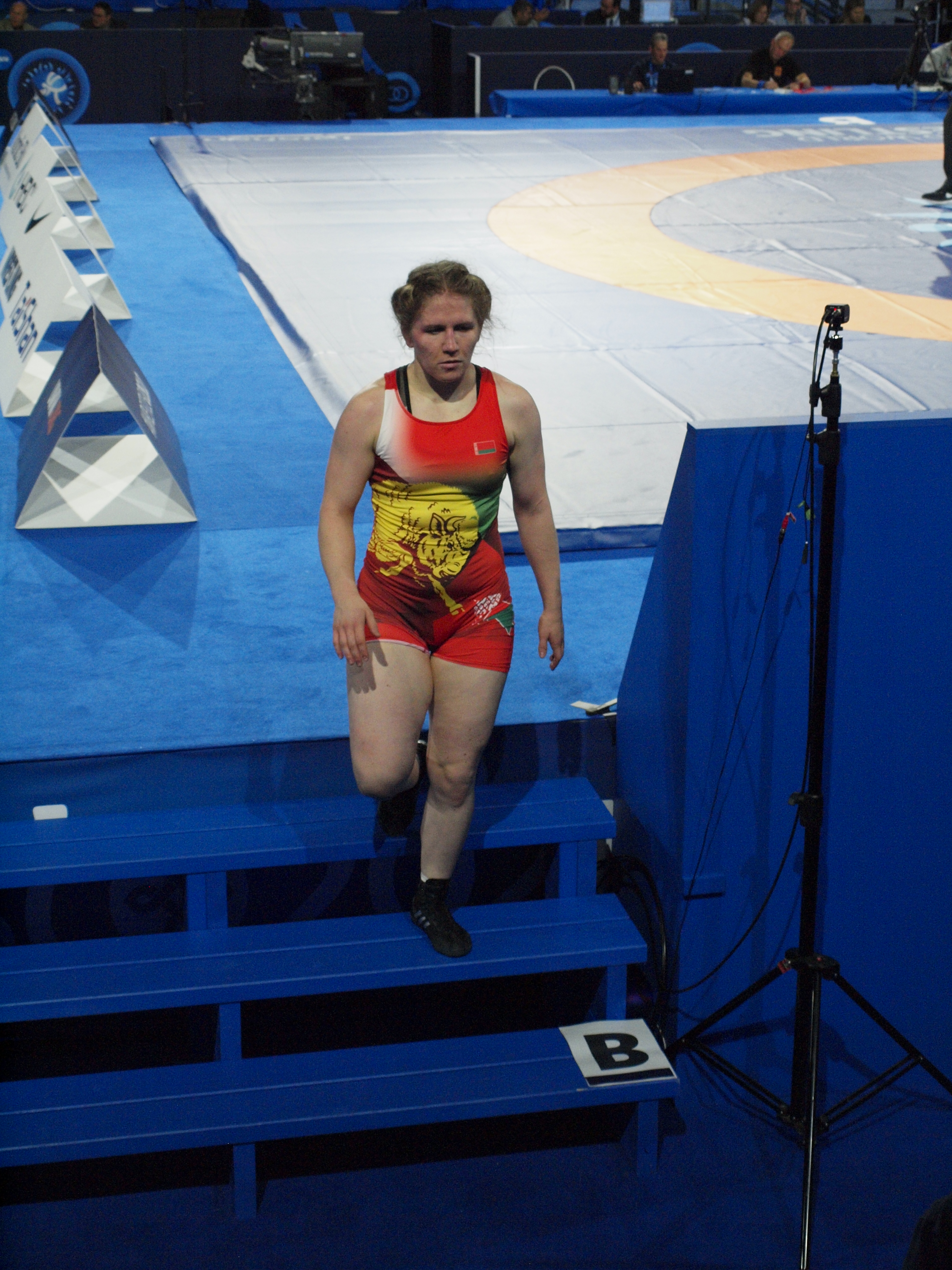
- Anastasiya Zimiankova at the 2021 World Wrestling Championships in Oslo, Norway

Sport
- Country: Belarus
- Sport: Amateur wrestling
- Weight class: 72 kg
- Event: Freestyle
Medal record
Women's freestyle wrestling
Representing United World Wrestling
European Championships
Bronze medal – third place	2025 Bratislava	76 kg
Representing Belarus
European Championships
Silver medal – second place	2018 Kaspiysk	72 kg
BRICS Games
Gold medal – first place	2024 Kazan	76 kg
Golden Grand Prix Ivan Yarygin
Silver medal – second place	2023 Krasnoyarsk	76 kg
Bronze medal – third place	2025 Krasnoyarsk	76 kg
Bronze medal – third place	2026 Krasnoyarsk	76 kg
European U23 Championship
Silver medal – second place	2018 Istanbul	72 kg
Bronze medal – third place	2021 Skopje	72 kg

Anastasiya Zimiankova is a Belarusian freestyle wrestler. She won the silver medal in the 72 kg event at the 2018 European Wrestling Championships held in Kaspiysk, Russia.

== Career ==
At the 2018 European U23 Wrestling Championship held in Istanbul, Turkey, Zimiankova won the silver medal in the 72 kg event. In the final, she lost against Koumba Larroque of France.

Zimiankova competed in the 72 kg event at the 2019 European Wrestling Championships and in that same event at the 2020 European Wrestling Championships without winning a medal.

In May 2021, Zimiankova failed to qualify for the 2020 Summer Olympics at the World Olympic Qualification Tournament held in Sofia, Bulgaria. In October 2021, she competed in the 72 kg event at the World Wrestling Championships held in Oslo, Norway where she was eliminated in her second match by eventual bronze medalist Buse Tosun of Turkey. A month later, she lost her bronze medal match in the 72 kg event at the 2021 U23 World Wrestling Championships held in Belgrade, Serbia.

Zimiankova competed at the 2024 European Wrestling Olympic Qualification Tournament in Baku, Azerbaijan hoping to qualify for the 2024 Summer Olympics in Paris, France. She was eliminated in her second match and she did not qualify for the Olympics. Zimiankova also competed at the 2024 World Wrestling Olympic Qualification Tournament held in Istanbul, Turkey without qualifying for the Olympics. She lost her third match, against Cătălina Axente of Romania, and she then lost her bronze medal match against Pauline Lecarpentier of France.

In 2025, Zimiankova won a bronze medal in the 76 kg event at the European Wrestling Championships held in Bratislava, Slovakia. She defeated Laura Kühn of Germany in her bronze medal match.

== Achievements ==
Year	Tournament	Location	Result	Event
2018	European Championships	Kaspiysk, Russia	2nd	Freestyle 72 kg
2025	European Championships	Bratislava, Slovakia	3rd	Freestyle 76 kg
