= Cătălina Axente =

Romanian freestyle wrestler (born 1995)

Personal information
- Born: 31 October 1995 (age 30) Galați, Romania

Sport
- Country: Romania
- Sport: Amateur wrestling
- Weight class: 72 kg; 76 kg
- Event: Freestyle
Medal record
Women's freestyle wrestling
Representing Romania
European Championships
Bronze medal – third place	2020 Rome	72 kg
Bronze medal – third place	2023 Zagreb	76 kg
European U23 Championship
Bronze medal – third place	2018 Istanbul	76 kg
Jeux de la Francophonie
Gold medal – first place	2023 Kinshasa	76 kg
Bronze medal – third place	2017 Abidjan	75 kg

Cătălina Axente (born 31 October 1995) is a Romanian freestyle wrestler. She won one of the bronze medals in the 72 kg event at the 2020 European Wrestling Championships held in Rome, Italy. She also won one of the bronze medals in the 76 kg event at the 2023 European Wrestling Championships held in Zagreb, Croatia.

== Career ==
In 2018, Axente won a bronze medal in the 76 kg event at the European U23 Wrestling Championship held in Istanbul, Turkey. She defeated Francy Rädelt of Germany in her bronze medal match.

Axente represented Romania at the 2019 European Games held in Minsk, Belarus in the 76 kg where she lost her only match against Ayşegül Özbeğe. In 2020, she was eliminated in her first match in the women's 76 kg event at the Individual Wrestling World Cup held in Belgrade, Serbia.

In March 2021, Axente competed at the European Qualification Tournament in Budapest, Hungary hoping to qualify for the 2020 Summer Olympics in Tokyo, Japan. In April 2021, she was eliminated in her first match in the 72 kg event at the European Wrestling Championships in Warsaw, Poland. In May 2021, Axente failed to qualify for the Olympics at the World Olympic Qualification Tournament held in Sofia, Bulgaria.

In 2022, Axente competed in the 76 kg event at the Yasar Dogu Tournament held in Istanbul, Turkey. She lost her bronze medal match in the 76 kg event at the 2022 European Wrestling Championships held in Budapest, Hungary. A few months later, Axente also lost her bronze medal match in her event at the Matteo Pellicone Ranking Series 2022 held in Rome, Italy. She competed in the 76 kg event at the 2022 World Wrestling Championships held in Belgrade, Serbia where she was eliminated in her second match.

Axente won one of the bronze medals in the 76 kg event at the 2023 European Wrestling Championships held in Zagreb, Croatia. She won the gold medal in her event at the 2023 Jeux de la Francophonie held in Kinshasa, Democratic Republic of Congo. In September 2023, Axente lost her bronze medal match in the women's 76 kg event at the World Wrestling Championships held in Belgrade, Serbia. She also lost a separate Olympic qualification match against Milaimys Marín of Cuba and she did not qualify for the 2024 Summer Olympics in Paris, France.

In 2024, she competed in the 76 kg event at the European Wrestling Championships held in Bucharest, Romania where she was eliminated in her first match. Two months later, Axente competed at the 2024 European Wrestling Olympic Qualification Tournament in Baku, Azerbaijan hoping to qualify for the 2024 Summer Olympics. She was eliminated in her first match and she did not qualify for the Olympics at this event. A month later, Axente earned a quota place for Romania for the Olympics at the 2024 World Wrestling Olympic Qualification Tournament held in Istanbul, Turkey. She was injured in her first match in the women's 76 kg event at the Olympics, leaving her unable to continue in the competition.

In 2025, Axente competed in the 76 kg event at the 2025 European Wrestling Championships held in Bratislava, Slovakia.

== Achievements ==
Year	Tournament	Location	Result	Event
2017	Jeux de la Francophonie	Abidjan, Ivory Coast	3rd	Freestyle 75 kg
2020	European Championships	Rome, Italy	3rd	Freestyle 72 kg
2023	European Championships	Zagreb, Croatia	3rd	Freestyle 76 kg
2023	Jeux de la Francophonie	Kinshasa, Democratic Republic of Congo	1st	Freestyle 76 kg
