= 2018 European U23 Wrestling Championships =

2018 European U23 Championships
- Host city: Istanbul, Turkey
- Dates: June 4–10
- Stadium: Bağcılar Olympic Sport Hall

Champions
- Freestyle: Russia
- Greco-Roman: Russia
- Women: Russia

The 2018 European U23 Wrestling Championship was the 4th edition of European U23 Wrestling Championships of combined events, and took place from June 4 to 10 in Istanbul, Turkey.

== Medal table ==
* Host nation (Turkey)

Rank	Nation	Gold	Silver	Bronze	Total
1	Russia	12	7	3	22
2	Ukraine	4	3	5	12
3	Turkey*	3	6	8	17
4	Georgia	3	1	7	11
5	Azerbaijan	2	2	3	7
6	Belarus	1	2	2	5
7	France	1	1	2	4
8	Bulgaria	1	1	0	2
9	Romania	1	0	4	5
10	Poland	1	0	1	2
11	Denmark	1	0	0	1
12	Moldova	0	3	0	3
13	Hungary	0	1	3	4
14	Germany	0	1	2	3
15	Croatia	0	1	0	1
15	Slovakia	0	1	0	1
17	Armenia	0	0	5	5
18	Norway	0	0	4	4
19	Finland	0	0	2	2
20	Austria	0	0	1	1
20	Greece	0	0	1	1
20	Italy	0	0	1	1
20	Latvia	0	0	1	1
20	Lithuania	0	0	1	1
20	Sweden	0	0	1	1
Totals (25 entries)		30	30	57	117

== Team ranking ==
Rank	Men's freestyle		Men's Greco-Roman		Women's freestyle	
Rank	Team	Points	Team	Points	Team	Points
1	Russia	215	Russia	161	Russia	161
2	Turkey	125	Turkey	142	Ukraine	151
3	Georgia	119	Georgia	121	Turkey	123
4	Ukraine	109	Hungary	95	Belarus	108
5	Azerbaijan	102	Ukraine	89	Bulgaria	67

== Medal summary ==
=== Men's freestyle ===
Event	Gold	Silver	Bronze
57 kg	(Russia) Ibragim Ilyasov	(Azerbaijan) Afgan Khashalov	(Ukraine) Taras Markovych
57 kg	(Russia) Ibragim Ilyasov	(Azerbaijan) Afgan Khashalov	(Greece) Georgios Pilidis
61 kg	(Russia) Magomedrasul Idrisov	(Moldova) Vitalie Bunici	(Georgia (country)) Teimuraz Vanishvili
61 kg	(Russia) Magomedrasul Idrisov	(Moldova) Vitalie Bunici	(Turkey) Ertuğrul Kahveci
65 kg	(Russia) Nachyn Kuular	(Azerbaijan) Anvarbek Dalgatov	(France) Ilman Mukhtarov
65 kg	(Russia) Nachyn Kuular	(Azerbaijan) Anvarbek Dalgatov	(Ukraine) Andrii Svyryd
70 kg	(Ukraine) Oleksii Boruta	(Turkey) Enes Uslu	(Armenia) Gevorg Mkheyan
70 kg	(Ukraine) Oleksii Boruta	(Turkey) Enes Uslu	(Georgia (country)) Giorgi Sulava
74 kg	(Russia) Zaurbek Sidakov	(Slovakia) Akhsarbek Gulaev	(Latvia) Alberts Jurcenko
74 kg	(Russia) Zaurbek Sidakov	(Slovakia) Akhsarbek Gulaev	(Georgia (country)) Avtandil Kentchadze
79 kg	(Russia) Radik Valiev	(France) Johnny Bur	(Georgia (country)) Nika Kentchadze
79 kg	(Russia) Radik Valiev	(France) Johnny Bur	(Azerbaijan) Murad Süleymanov
86 kg	(Russia) Arsen-Ali Musalaliev	(Turkey) Arif Özen	(Armenia) Hovhannes Mkhitaryan
86 kg	(Russia) Arsen-Ali Musalaliev	(Turkey) Arif Özen	(Belarus) Raman Chytadze
92 kg	(Azerbaijan) Shamil Zubairov	(Georgia (country)) Irakli Mtsituri	(Turkey) Semih Yazıcı
92 kg	(Azerbaijan) Shamil Zubairov	(Georgia (country)) Irakli Mtsituri	(Russia) Batyrbek Tsakulov
97 kg	(Belarus) Dzianis Khramiankou	(Russia) Rasul Magomedov	(Georgia (country)) Givi Matcharashvili
97 kg	(Belarus) Dzianis Khramiankou	(Russia) Rasul Magomedov	(Germany) Erik Thiele
125 kg	(Poland) Kamil Kościółek	(Russia) Khasan Khubaev	(Turkey) Hüseyin Civelek
125 kg	(Poland) Kamil Kościółek	(Russia) Khasan Khubaev	(Finland) Jere Heino

=== Men's Greco-Roman ===
Event	Gold	Silver	Bronze
55 kg	(Georgia (country)) Nugzari Tsurtsumia	(Turkey) Ekrem Öztürk	(Armenia) Norayr Hakhoyan
55 kg	(Georgia (country)) Nugzari Tsurtsumia	(Turkey) Ekrem Öztürk	(Romania) Florin Tița
60 kg	(Turkey) Kerem Kamal	(Russia) Artur Petrosyan	(Georgia (country)) Dato Chkhartishvili
60 kg	(Turkey) Kerem Kamal	(Russia) Artur Petrosyan	(Azerbaijan) Murad Mammadov
63 kg	(Romania) Mihai Mihuț	(Moldova) Alexandru Biciu	(Georgia (country)) Leri Abuladze
63 kg	(Romania) Mihai Mihuț	(Moldova) Alexandru Biciu	(Armenia) Slavik Galstyan
67 kg	(Russia) Alen Mirzoian	(Hungary) Ottó Losonczi	(Norway) Morten Thoresen
67 kg	(Russia) Alen Mirzoian	(Hungary) Ottó Losonczi	(Poland) Roman Pacurkowski
72 kg	(Georgia (country)) Ramaz Zoidze	(Turkey) Cengiz Arslan	(Armenia) Arman Baghdasaryan
72 kg	(Georgia (country)) Ramaz Zoidze	(Turkey) Cengiz Arslan	(Russia) Narek Oganian
77 kg	(Denmark) Rajbek Bisultanov	(Russia) Ismail Saidkhasanov	(Ukraine) Elmar Nuraliev
77 kg	(Denmark) Rajbek Bisultanov	(Russia) Ismail Saidkhasanov	(Turkey) Fatih Cengiz
82 kg	(Russia) Vaag Margarian	(Ukraine) Yaroslav Filchakov	(Turkey) Burhan Akbudak
82 kg	(Russia) Vaag Margarian	(Ukraine) Yaroslav Filchakov	(Azerbaijan) Eltun Vazirzade
87 kg	(Azerbaijan) Islam Abbasov	(Croatia) Ivan Huklek	(Russia) Gazi Khalilov
87 kg	(Azerbaijan) Islam Abbasov	(Croatia) Ivan Huklek	(Lithuania) Martynas Nemsevičius
97 kg	(Russia) Aleksandr Golovin	(Ukraine) Vladen Kozliuk	(Turkey) Süleyman Erbay
97 kg	(Russia) Aleksandr Golovin	(Ukraine) Vladen Kozliuk	(Finland) Arvi Savolainen
130 kg	(Georgia (country)) Zviadi Pataridze	(Turkey) Osman Yıldırım	(Norway) Oskar Marvik
130 kg	(Georgia (country)) Zviadi Pataridze	(Turkey) Osman Yıldırım	(Hungary) Ferenc Almási

=== Women's freestyle ===
Event	Gold	Silver	Bronze
50 kg	(Ukraine) Oksana Livach	(Turkey) Evin Demirhan	(Belarus) Kseniya Stankevich
50 kg	(Ukraine) Oksana Livach	(Turkey) Evin Demirhan	(Germany) Ellen Riesterer
53 kg	(Turkey) Zeynep Yetgil	(Belarus) Katsiaryna Pichkouskaya	(Norway) Silje Kippernes
53 kg	(Turkey) Zeynep Yetgil	(Belarus) Katsiaryna Pichkouskaya	(France) Hilary Honorine
55 kg	(Russia) Nina Menkenova	(Germany) Elena Brugger	(Turkey) Elif Yanık
55 kg	(Russia) Nina Menkenova	(Germany) Elena Brugger	(Hungary) Ramóna Galambos
57 kg	(Russia) Alexandra Andreeva	(Ukraine) Alina Akobiia	(Hungary) Viktória Vilhelm
59 kg	(Bulgaria) Bilyana Dudova	(Moldova) Anastasia Nichita	(Sweden) Elin Nilsson
59 kg	(Bulgaria) Bilyana Dudova	(Moldova) Anastasia Nichita	(Ukraine) Ołena Kremzer
62 kg	(Ukraine) Ilona Prokopevniuk	(Russia) Tatiana Smoliak	(Austria) Kathrin Mathis
62 kg	(Ukraine) Ilona Prokopevniuk	(Russia) Tatiana Smoliak	(Romania) Kriszta Incze
65 kg	(Russia) Maria Kuznetsova	(Bulgaria) Sofiya Georgieva	(Turkey) Aslı Tuğcu
68 kg	(Turkey) Buse Tosun	(Russia) Khanum Velieva	(Ukraine) Alla Belinska
72 kg	(France) Koumba Larroque	(Belarus) Anastasiya Zimiankova	(Italy) Enrica Rinaldi
72 kg	(France) Koumba Larroque	(Belarus) Anastasiya Zimiankova	(Romania) Alexandra Anghel
76 kg	(Ukraine) Anastasiia Shustova	(Russia) Kristina Shumova	(Norway) Iselin Solheim
76 kg	(Ukraine) Anastasiia Shustova	(Russia) Kristina Shumova	(Romania) Cătălina Axente
