= Enrica Rinaldi =

Italian freestyle wrestler

Personal information
- Born: 11 August 1998 (age 28)

Sport
- Country: Italy
- Sport: Amateur wrestling
- Weight class: 76 kg
- Event: Freestyle
Medal record
Women's freestyle wrestling
Representing Italy
European Championships
Bronze medal – third place	2022 Budapest	76 kg
Bronze medal – third place	2024 Bucharest	76 kg
Mediterranean Games
Silver medal – second place	2022 Oran	76 kg
Bronze medal – third place	2026 Taranto	76 kg
World Military Championships
Silver medal – second place	2023 Baku	76 kg
Bronze medal – third place	2025 Warendorf	65 kg
Grand Prix
Gold medal – first place	2023 Sassari	76 kg
Silver medal – second place	2025 Sassari	76 kg
Silver medal – second place	2026 Nice	76 kg
Bronze medal – third place	2025 Warsaw	76 kg
World U23 Championships
Bronze medal – third place	2021 Belgrade	76 kg
Women's beach wrestling
Representing Italy
Mediterranean Beach Games
Silver medal – second place	2019 Patras	+70 kg

Enrica Rinaldi (born 11 August 1998) is an Italian freestyle wrestler. She won one of the bronze medals in the women's 76 kg event at the 2022 European Wrestling Championships held in Budapest, Hungary. A few months later, she won the silver medal in the 76 kg event at the 2022 Mediterranean Games held in Oran, Algeria.

== Career ==
=== Freestyle wrestling ===
Rinaldi won one of the bronze medals in her event at the 2018 European U23 Wrestling Championship held in Istanbul, Turkey. She won the silver medal in her event at the 2018 European Juniors Wrestling Championships held in Rome, Italy. She was eliminated in her first match in the 76 kg event at the 2019 European Wrestling Championships held in Bucharest, Romania. Rinaldi lost her bronze medal match in the 72 kg event at the 2020 European Wrestling Championships held in Rome, Italy.

In 2021, Rinaldi won one of the bronze medals in the 76 kg event at the Matteo Pellicone Ranking Series 2021 held in Rome, Italy. She was eliminated in her first match in the 76 kg event at the 2021 European Wrestling Championships held in Warsaw, Poland. At the 2021 U23 World Wrestling Championships held in Belgrade, Serbia, Rinaldi won one of the bronze medals in the 76 kg event.

In 2022, Rinaldi was eliminated in her first match in the 76 kg event at the World Wrestling Championships held in Belgrade, Serbia. She was also eliminated in her first match in the 76 kg event at the 2023 World Wrestling Championships held in Belgrade, Serbia.

Rinaldi won one of the bronze medals in the 76 kg event at the 2024 European Wrestling Championships held in Bucharest, Romania. She defeated Kamilė Gaučaitė of Lithuania in her bronze medal match. Rinaldi competed at the 2024 European Wrestling Olympic Qualification Tournament in Baku, Azerbaijan hoping to qualify for the 2024 Summer Olympics in Paris, France. She was eliminated in her first match and she did not qualify for the Olympics. Rinaldi also competed at the 2024 World Wrestling Olympic Qualification Tournament held in Istanbul, Turkey without qualifying for the Olympics. She was eliminated in her third match.

Rinaldi lost her bronze medal match in the 76 kg event at the 2025 European Wrestling Championships held in Bratislava, Slovakia.

=== Beach wrestling ===
Rinaldi also competes in beach wrestling. She won the silver medal in the women's +70 kg event at the 2019 Mediterranean Beach Games held in Patras, Greece. In 2021, Rinaldi won the gold medal in her event at the Beach Wrestling World Series event held in Rome, Italy.

== Achievements ==
Women's freestyle wrestling

Year	Tournament	Location	Result	Event
2022	European Championships	Budapest, Hungary	3rd	Freestyle 76 kg
2022	Mediterranean Games	Oran, Algeria	2nd	Freestyle 76 kg
2024	European Championships	Bucharest, Romania	3rd	Freestyle 76 kg
2026	Mediterranean Games	Taranto, Italy	3rd	Freestyle 76 kg

Women's beach wrestling

Year	Tournament	Location	Result	Event
2019	Mediterranean Beach Games	Patras, Greece	2nd	Women's +70 kg
