= Wang Juan (wrestler) =

Chinese freestyle wrestler

Personal information
- Native name: 王娟
- Born: 14 April 1995 (age 31) Yingshang County, Anhui, China
- Height: 174 cm (5 ft 9 in)

Sport
- Country: China
- Sport: Amateur wrestling
- Weight class: 76 kg
- Event: Freestyle
Medal record
Women's freestyle wrestling
Representing China
Asian Games
Bronze medal – third place	2022 Hangzhou	76 kg
Asian Championships
Bronze medal – third place	2023 Astana	76 kg
Bronze medal – third place	2013 New Delhi	72 kg
Military World Games
Silver medal – second place	2019 Wuhan	76 kg
Golden Grand Prix Ivan Yarygin
Gold medal – first place	2020 Krasnoyarsk	76 kg
Gold medal – first place	2018 Krasnoyarsk	72 kg

Wang Juan (Chinese: 王娟, born 14 April 1995) is a Chinese freestyle wrestler. She is a bronze medalist in the 76 kg event at both the 2023 Asian Wrestling Championships and the 2022 Asian Games.

== Background ==
Wang was born in Yingshang County, Anhui province. She joined the Anhui provincial Sports Team in 2008 and the Chinese national team in 2010

She competed at the 2024 Asian Wrestling Olympic Qualification Tournament in Bishkek, Kyrgyzstan and she earned a quota place for China for the 2024 Summer Olympics in Paris, France. She competed in the women's 76 kg event at the Olympics.
