= Pan American Wrestling Championships =

Continental wrestling championships for the Americas

- Status: Active
- Genre: Sports event
- Date: February – May
- Frequency: Annual
- Location: Various
- Inaugurated: 1977
- Most recent: 2026
- Next event: 2027
- Major events: Amateur wrestling
- Organiser: FILA → UWW

The Pan American Wrestling Championships is the continental wrestling championships for nations from North America, Central America, South America, and the Caribbean. Three wrestling styles, recognized internationally by UWW, have been contested annually since its inception, namely: Greco-Roman, freestyle, and sambo wrestling. Since 1997, women's freestyle has also been contested.

== History ==
Since the inception, sambo wrestling has been contested jointly with the Olympic wrestling styles. National teams, including the U.S. team, featured a number of veteran sambo athletes, along with experienced international wrestlers who have decided to compete in sambo. From the 1980s to 2000s saw the period of separation until the 2006, when FILA again took sambo under its control, and the Pan American Sambo Championships were expected to be included at the 2006 Pan American Wrestling Championships in Rio de Janeiro, Brazil. The hosts in Brazil had difficulties that prevented the sambo event to be included in the competition. USA Wrestling has agreed to host the Pan American Sambo Championships alongside its U.S. Sambo National Championships. In 2013 the Olympic styles and Sambo has been contested in Panama City, Panama. Following the inclusion of combat sambo into the Pan American Sambo Championships programme, which isn't exactly a wrestling style, the two championships are being held separately.

== Medal table ==
https://intersportstats.com/competition_types/453

== Championships ==
=== Senior ===
| Year | Host | Venue | Dates | Style | Events | Team Champion |
|---|---|---|---|---|---|---|
| 1977 | Mexico City | Social Center Gymnasium | September 29 – October 1 | GR | 10 | United States |
| 1977 | Mexico City | Social Center Gymnasium | September 29 – October 1 | FS | 10 | United States |
| 1977 | Mexico City | Social Center Gymnasium | September 28 – October 2 | Sambo | 10 | United States |
| 1979 | (United States) San Diego | San Diego State University | August 29–31 | Sambo | 11 | United States |
| 1979 | (United States) San Diego | San Diego State University | | FS | 10 | |
| 1980 | (United States) San Diego | San Diego State University | June 5–6 | GR | 10 | |
| 1980 | (United States) San Diego | San Diego State University | June 7–8 | FS | 10 | |
| 1980 | (United States) San Diego | San Diego State University | June | Sambo | 10 | |
| 1981 | Mexico City | | May 17–31 | GR | 10 | |
| 1981 | Mexico City | | May 17–31 | FS | 10 | |
| 1984 | Mexico City | | | GR | 10 | |
| 1984 | Mexico City | | | FS | 10 | |
| 1986 | (United States) Colorado Springs | Olympic Training Center | September 18–20 | GR | 10 | Cuba |
| 1986 | (United States) Colorado Springs | Olympic Training Center | September 18–20 | FS | 10 | United States |
| 1987 | Offset of the results of the wrestling tournament at the 1987 Pan American Games, Indianapolis, USA | | | GR | 10 | Cuba |
| 1987 | Offset of the results of the wrestling tournament at the 1987 Pan American Games, Indianapolis, USA | | | FS | 10 | United States |
| 1988 | (United States) Newark | Essex County College | April 9 | Sambo | 10 | |
| 1988 | Mexico City | | September 18–20 | GR | 10 | Cuba |
| 1988 | Mexico City | | September 18–20 | FS | 10 | Cuba |
| 1989 | (United States) Colorado Springs | Olympic Training Center | June 13–15 | GR | 10 | Cuba |
| 1989 | (United States) Colorado Springs | Olympic Training Center | June 13–15 | FS | 10 | United States |
| 1990 | (United States) Colorado Springs | Olympic Training Center | June 13 | GR | 10 | Cuba |
| 1990 | (United States) Colorado Springs | Olympic Training Center | June 13 | FS | 10 | United States |
| 1991 | Offset of the results of the wrestling tournament at the 1991 Pan American Games, Havana, Cuba | | | GR | 10 | Cuba |
| 1991 | Offset of the results of the wrestling tournament at the 1991 Pan American Games, Havana, Cuba | | | FS | 10 | United States |
| 1992 | (United States) Albany | | January | GR | 10 | Cuba |
| 1992 | (United States) Albany | | January | FS | 10 | United States |
| 1992 | | | June 1 | Sambo | | |
| 1993 | (United States) Chula Vista | Chula Vista High School | April 24 | Sambo | 10 | |
| 1993 | Guatemala City | | May 21 | GR | 10 | Cuba |
| 1993 | Guatemala City | | May 21 | FS | 10 | United States |
| 1994 | (United States) Chula Vista | Southwestern College | 26 March | Sambo | 10 | |
| 1994 | Mexico City | | May 20 | GR | 10 | Cuba |
| 1994 | Mexico City | | May 20 | FS | 10 | United States |
| 1997 | (Puerto Rico) San Juan | | May 21 | GR | 8 | Cuba |
| 1997 | (Puerto Rico) San Juan | | May 21 | FS | 8 | Cuba |
| 1997 | (Puerto Rico) San Juan | | May 21 | LF | 6 | United States |
| 1998 | (Canada) Winnipeg | | March 24–27 | GR | 8 | Cuba |
| 1998 | (Canada) Winnipeg | | March 24–27 | FS | 8 | Cuba |
| 1998 | (Canada) Winnipeg | | March 24–27 | LF | 6 | Canada |
| 2000 | (Colombia) Cali | | May 19 | GR | 8 | Cuba |
| 2000 | (Colombia) Cali | | May 19 | FS | 8 | Cuba |
| 2000 | (Colombia) Cali | | May 19 | LF | 6 | United States |
| 2001 | (Dominican Republic) Santo Domingo | | May 14–18 | GR | 8 | Cuba |
| 2001 | (Dominican Republic) Santo Domingo | | May 14–18 | FS | 8 | Cuba |
| 2001 | (Dominican Republic) Santo Domingo | | May 14–18 | LF | 6 | United States |
| 2002 | (Venezuela) Maracaibo | | May 14 | GR | 7 | Cuba |
| 2002 | (Venezuela) Maracaibo | | May 14 | FS | 7 | Cuba |
| 2002 | (Venezuela) Maracaibo | | May 14 | LF | 7 | United States |
| 2003 | Guatemala City | | May 18 | GR | 7 | United States |
| 2003 | Guatemala City | | May 18 | FS | 7 | United States |
| 2003 | Guatemala City | | May 18 | LF | 7 | Venezuela |
| 2004 | Guatemala City | | May 6 | GR | 7 | Cuba |
| 2004 | Guatemala City | | May 6 | FS | 7 | Cuba |
| 2004 | Guatemala City | | May 6 | LF | 7 | United States |
| 2005 | Guatemala City | | April 27 | GR | 7 | Cuba |
| 2005 | Guatemala City | | April 27 | FS | 7 | Cuba |
| 2005 | Guatemala City | | April 27 | LF | 7 | Venezuela |
| 2006 | (Brazil) Rio de Janeiro | | May 31 | GR | 7 | Cuba |
| 2006 | (Brazil) Rio de Janeiro | | May 31 | FS | 7 | United States |
| 2006 | (Brazil) Rio de Janeiro | | May 31 | LF | 7 | United States |
| 2006 | (Brazil) Rio de Janeiro | | May 31 | LF | 7 | Venezuela |
| 2006 | (United States) North Palm Beach | North Palm Beach Community Center | August 19–20 | Sambo | 7 | |
| 2007 | (El Salvador) San Salvador | | May 18 | GR | 7 | Cuba |
| 2007 | (El Salvador) San Salvador | | May 18 | FS | 7 | Cuba |
| 2007 | (El Salvador) San Salvador | | May 18 | FS | 7 | United States |
| 2007 | (El Salvador) San Salvador | | May 18 | LF | 7 | Venezuela |
| 2008 | (United States) Colorado Springs | | February 29 | GR | 7 | Cuba |
| 2008 | (United States) Colorado Springs | | February 29 | FS | 7 | United States |
| 2008 | (United States) Colorado Springs | | February 29 | LF | 7 | United States |
| 2009 | (Venezuela) Maracaibo | | April 22 | GR | 7 | Cuba |
| 2009 | (Venezuela) Maracaibo | | April 22 | FS | 7 | Cuba |
| 2009 | (Venezuela) Maracaibo | | April 22 | LF | 7 | United States |
| 2010 | (Mexico) Monterrey | | April 28–30 | GR | 7 | Cuba |
| 2010 | (Mexico) Monterrey | | April 28–30 | FS | 7 | Cuba |
| 2010 | (Mexico) Monterrey | | April 28–30 | LF | 7 | United States |
| 2011 | (Colombia) Rionegro | | May 6 | GR | 7 | Cuba |
| 2011 | (Colombia) Rionegro | | May 6 | FS | 7 | Cuba |
| 2011 | (Colombia) Rionegro | | May 6 | LF | 7 | Canada |
| 2012 | (United States) Colorado Springs | | February 24–26 | GR | 7 | Cuba |
| 2012 | (United States) Colorado Springs | | February 24–26 | FS | 7 | United States |
| 2012 | (United States) Colorado Springs | | February 24–26 | LF | 7 | United States |
| 2013 | Panama City | Gimnasio Beto Remon | April 5 | GR | 7 | Cuba |
| 2013 | Panama City | Gimnasio Beto Remon | April 6 | LF | 7 | Canada |
| 2013 | Panama City | Gimnasio Beto Remon | April 6–7 | FS | 7 | Cuba |
| 2013 | Panama City | Gimnasio Beto Remon | April 6–7 | FS | 7 | United States |
| 2013 | Panama City | Gimnasio Beto Remon | June 15–16 | Sambo | 17 | Venezuela |
| 2014 | Mexico City | | July 15–17 | GR | 8 | Cuba |
| 2014 | Mexico City | | July 15–17 | FS | 8 | United States |
| 2014 | Mexico City | | July 15–17 | LF | 8 | Colombia |
| 2014 | Mexico City | | July 15–17 | LF | 8 | Canada |
| 2014 | (Trinidad and Tobago) Port of Spain | | October 3–5 | Sambo | | |
| 2015 | (Chile) Santiago | | April 22–27 | GR | 8 | Cuba |
| 2015 | (Chile) Santiago | | April 22–27 | FS | 8 | United States |
| 2015 | (Chile) Santiago | | April 22–27 | LF | 8 | Canada |
| 2015 | (Nicaragua) Managua | University of Managua Gymnasium | September 5–6 | Sambo | 16 | |
| 2016 | (United States) Frisco | | February 26–28 | GR | 8 | Cuba |
| 2016 | (United States) Frisco | | February 26–28 | FS | 8 | United States |
| 2016 | (United States) Frisco | | February 26–28 | LF | 8 | United States |
| 2016 | (Paraguay) Asunción | | August 25–29 | Sambo | 17 | United States |
| 2017 | (Brazil) Lauro de Freitas | | May 5–7 | FS | 8 | United States |
| 2017 | (Brazil) Lauro de Freitas | | May 5–7 | GR | 8 | United States |
| 2017 | (Brazil) Lauro de Freitas | | May 5–7 | WW | 8 | Canada |
| 2017 | (Colombia) Buga | | July 6–10 | Sambo | 17 | Venezuela |
| 2018 | (Peru) Lima | | May 3–6 | FS | 10 | United States |
| 2018 | (Peru) Lima | | May 3–6 | GR | 10 | United States |
| 2018 | (Peru) Lima | | May 3–6 | WW | 10 | United States |
| 2018 | (Mexico) Acapulco | | July 21–22 | Sambo | 17 | Dominican Republic |
| 2019 | (Argentina) Buenos Aires | | April 18–21 | FS | 10 | United States |
| 2019 | (Argentina) Buenos Aires | | April 18–21 | GR | 10 | United States |
| 2019 | (Argentina) Buenos Aires | | April 18–21 | WW | 10 | United States |
| 2019 | (Dominican Republic) Santo Domingo | | July 28–29 | Sambo | 17 | Dominican Republic |
| 2020 | (Canada) Ottawa | Shaw Centre | March 6–9 | FS | 10 | United States |
| 2020 | (Canada) Ottawa | Shaw Centre | March 6–9 | GR | 10 | United States |
| 2020 | (Canada) Ottawa | Shaw Centre | March 6–9 | WW | 10 | United States |
| 2021 | Guatemala City | | May 27–30 | FS | 10 | United States |
| 2021 | Guatemala City | | May 27–30 | GR | 10 | United States |
| 2021 | Guatemala City | | May 27–30 | WW | 10 | United States |
| 2022 | (Mexico) Acapulco | | May 5–8 | FS | 10 | United States |
| 2022 | (Mexico) Acapulco | | May 5–8 | GR | 10 | United States |
| 2022 | (Mexico) Acapulco | | May 5–8 | WW | 10 | United States |
| 2023 | (Argentina) Buenos Aires | | May 3–7 | FS | 10 | United States |
| 2023 | (Argentina) Buenos Aires | | May 3–7 | GR | 10 | United States |
| 2023 | (Argentina) Buenos Aires | | May 3–7 | WW | 10 | United States |
| 2024 | (Mexico) Acapulco | | February 21–24 | FS | 10 | United States |
| 2024 | (Mexico) Acapulco | | February 21–24 | GR | 10 | United States |
| 2024 | (Mexico) Acapulco | | February 21–24 | WW | 10 | United States |
| 2025 | (Mexico) Monterrey | | May 8–11 | FS | 10 | United States |
| 2025 | (Mexico) Monterrey | | May 8–11 | GR | 10 | United States |
| 2025 | (Mexico) Monterrey | | May 8–11 | WW | 10 | United States |
| 2026 | (United States) Coralville | Xtream Arena | May 7–10 | FS | 10 | United States |
| 2026 | (United States) Coralville | Xtream Arena | May 7–10 | GR | 10 | United States |
| 2026 | (United States) Coralville | Xtream Arena | May 7–10 | WW | 10 | United States |

- Cuban Women's Team began participate in the LF event since the 2007' edition.

=== U23 ===
| Year | Host | Venue | Dates | Style | Events | Team Champion |
|---|---|---|---|---|---|---|
| 2024 | (Colombia) Rionegro | | June 21–22 | FS | 10 | United States |
| 2024 | (Colombia) Rionegro | | June 21–22 | GR | 10 | United States |
| 2024 | (Colombia) Rionegro | | June 21–22 | WW | 10 | United States |
| 2025 | (Mexico) Querétaro | | April 10–12 | FS | 10 | United States |
| 2025 | (Mexico) Querétaro | | April 10–12 | GR | 10 | Mexico |
| 2025 | (Mexico) Querétaro | | April 10–12 | WW | 10 | United States |
| 2026 | (Peru) Lima | | June 11–13 | FS | 10 | United States |
| 2026 | (Peru) Lima | | June 11–13 | GR | 10 | United States |
| 2026 | (Peru) Lima | | June 11–13 | WW | 10 | United States |

=== Junior (U20) ===
Junior Pan American Wrestling Championships for athletes aged 17–20 years (U20) predates the Senior Championships by one year.

| Year | Host | Venue | Dates | Style | Events | Team Champion |
|---|---|---|---|---|---|---|
| 1976 | (El Salvador) San Salvador | | December 9–10 | GR | 10 | Canada |
| 1976 | (El Salvador) San Salvador | | December 9–10 | FS | 10 | Canada |
| 1977 | (Ecuador) Quito | | June 22–24 | GR | 10 | Canada |
| 1977 | (Ecuador) Quito | | June 25–27 | FS | 10 | United States |
| 1978 | (Venezuela) Caracas | | June 7–11 | GR | 10 | |
| 1978 | (Venezuela) Caracas | | June 7–11 | FS | 10 | |
| 1979 | (Mexico) San Luis Potosí | | May 21–24 | GR | 10 | |
| 1979 | (Mexico) San Luis Potosí | | May 21–24 | FS | 10 | |
| 1980 | Panama City | | May 13–16 | | | |
| 1980 | (Puerto Rico) San Juan | | May 23–26 | GR | 10 | United States |
| 1980 | (Puerto Rico) San Juan | | May 23–26 | FS | 10 | Canada |
| 1982 | (Venezuela) Caracas | | July | GR | 10 | |
| 1982 | (Venezuela) Caracas | | July | FS | 10 | |
| 1983 | Mexico City | | July ? – 7 | GR | 10 | United States |
| 1983 | Mexico City | | July ? – 7 | FS | 10 | United States |
| 1984 | Mexico City | | June 21 – July 1 | GR | 10 | |
| 1984 | Mexico City | | June 21 – July 1 | FS | 10 | |
| 1985 | (Colombia) Cali | | July 3 | GR | 13 | United States |
| 1985 | (Colombia) Cali | | July 3 | FS | 13 | United States |
| 1989 | (Argentina) Santa Fe | | June 22–25 | GR | 10 | |
| 1989 | (Argentina) Santa Fe | | June 22–25 | FS | 10 | |
| 1992 | (Canada) London | | June ?–16 | GR | | |
| 1992 | (Canada) London | | June ?–16 | FS | | |
| 1993 | Cuba | | "Summer" | GR | | |
| 1993 | Cuba | | "Summer" | FS | | |
| 1994 | | | April | GR | | |
| 1994 | | | April | FS | | |
| 1996 | Colombia | | April | GR | | |
| 1996 | Colombia | | April | FS | | |
| 2002 | (Colombia) Bogotá | | June 7 | GR | 9 | Cuba |
| 2002 | (Colombia) Bogotá | | June 7 | FS | 9 | Colombia |
| 2002 | (Colombia) Bogotá | | June 7 | LF | 8 | Colombia |
| 2002 | (Colombia) Bogotá | | June 7 | LF | 8 | Mexico |
| 2004 | (Venezuela) Maracaibo | | July 16 | GR | 8 | Venezuela |
| 2004 | (Venezuela) Maracaibo | | July 16 | FS | 8 | Canada |
| 2004 | (Venezuela) Maracaibo | | July 16 | LF | 8 | Canada |
| 2004 | (Venezuela) Maracaibo | | July 16 | LF | 8 | Venezuela |
| 2005 | (Venezuela) Maracaibo | | June 29 | GR | 8 | Venezuela |
| 2005 | (Venezuela) Maracaibo | | June 29 | FS | 8 | Venezuela |
| 2005 | (Venezuela) Maracaibo | | June 29 | LF | 8 | Venezuela |
| 2006 | Guatemala City | | August 17 | GR | 8 | Venezuela |
| 2006 | Guatemala City | | August 17 | FS | 8 | Venezuela |
| 2006 | Guatemala City | | August 17 | LF | 8 | Venezuela |
| 2007 | (Venezuela) Maracaibo | | June 22 | GR | 8 | Venezuela |
| 2007 | (Venezuela) Maracaibo | | June 22 | FS | 8 | United States |
| 2007 | (Venezuela) Maracaibo | | June 22 | LF | 8 | United States |
| 2008 | (Ecuador) Cuenca | | June 20 | GR | 8 | United States |
| 2008 | (Ecuador) Cuenca | | June 20 | FS | 8 | United States |
| 2008 | (Ecuador) Cuenca | | June 20 | LF | 8 | United States |
| 2009 | (Mexico) Guadalajara | | September 23 | GR | 8 | United States |
| 2009 | (Mexico) Guadalajara | | September 24 | FS | 8 | Canada |
| 2009 | (Mexico) Guadalajara | | September 25 | LF | 8 | United States |
| 2010 | (Nicaragua) Managua | | July 9 | GR | 8 | Ecuador |
| 2010 | (Nicaragua) Managua | | July 9 | GR | 8 | United States |
| 2010 | (Nicaragua) Managua | | July 9 | FS | 8 | Canada |
| 2010 | (Nicaragua) Managua | | July 9 | LF | 8 | Canada |
| 2011 | (Brazil) São Paulo | | July 2 | GR | 8 | United States |
| 2011 | (Brazil) São Paulo | | July 1 | FS | 8 | United States |
| 2011 | (Brazil) São Paulo | | July 1 | LF | 8 | United States |
| 2012 | (Guatemala) Petén | | June 6 | GR | 8 | Dominican Republic |
| 2012 | (Guatemala) Petén | | June 6 | FS | 8 | United States |
| 2012 | (Guatemala) Petén | | June 6 | LF | 8 | United States |
| 2013 | (Chile) Santiago | | July 12 | GR | 8 | Venezuela |
| 2013 | (Chile) Santiago | | July 12 | FS | 8 | United States |
| 2013 | (Chile) Santiago | | July 12 | LF | 8 | Venezuela |
| 2014 | (Canada) Toronto | | June 27–29 | GR | 8 | United States |
| 2014 | (Canada) Toronto | | June 27–29 | FS | 8 | Canada |
| 2014 | (Canada) Toronto | | June 27–29 | LF | 8 | Canada |
| 2015 | (Cuba) Havana | | May 6–8 | GR | 8 | Cuba |
| 2015 | (Cuba) Havana | | May 6–8 | FS | 8 | United States |
| 2015 | (Cuba) Havana | | May 6–8 | LF | 8 | United States |
| 2016 | (Venezuela) Barinas | | June 10–12 | GR | 8 | Venezuela |
| 2016 | (Venezuela) Barinas | | June 10–12 | FS | 8 | Venezuela |
| 2016 | (Venezuela) Barinas | | June 10–12 | LF | 8 | Venezuela |
| 2017 | (Peru) Lima | | June 9–11 | GR | 8 | United States |
| 2017 | (Peru) Lima | | June 9–11 | FS | 8 | United States |
| 2017 | (Peru) Lima | | June 9–11 | LF | 8 | Canada |
| 2018 | (Brazil) Fortaleza | | August 15–17 | GR | 10 | United States |
| 2018 | (Brazil) Fortaleza | | August 17–19 | FS | 10 | United States |
| 2018 | (Brazil) Fortaleza | | August 17–19 | LF | 10 | Mexico |
| 2019 | Guatemala City | | June 5–7 | GR | 10 | United States |
| 2019 | Guatemala City | | June 5–7 | FS | 10 | United States |
| 2019 | Guatemala City | | June 5–7 | LF | 10 | United States |
| 2021 | (Mexico) Oaxtepec | | June 9–13 | FS | 10 | United States |
| 2021 | (Mexico) Oaxtepec | | June 9–13 | GR | 10 | United States |
| 2021 | (Mexico) Oaxtepec | | June 9–13 | WW | 10 | United States |
| 2022 | (Mexico) Oaxtepec | | July 8–10 | GR | 10 | United States |
| 2022 | (Mexico) Oaxtepec | | July 8–10 | FS | 10 | United States |
| 2022 | (Mexico) Oaxtepec | | July 8–10 | LF | 10 | United States |
| 2023 | (Chile) Santiago | | July 6–8 | FS | 10 | United States |
| 2023 | (Chile) Santiago | | July 6–8 | GR | 10 | United States |
| 2023 | (Chile) Santiago | | July 6–8 | WW | 10 | United States |
| 2024 | (Peru) Lima | | July 11–13 | FS | 10 | United States |
| 2024 | (Peru) Lima | | July 11–13 | GR | 10 | United States |
| 2024 | (Peru) Lima | | July 11–13 | WW | 10 | United States |
| 2025 | (Peru) Lima | | July 10–12 | FS | 10 | United States |
| 2025 | (Peru) Lima | | July 10–12 | GR | 10 | United States |
| 2025 | (Peru) Lima | | July 10–12 | WW | 10 | United States |
| 2026 | (Brazil) Rio de Janeiro | | July 9–11 | FS | 10 | United States |
| 2026 | (Brazil) Rio de Janeiro | | July 9–11 | GR | 10 | Mexico |
| 2026 | (Brazil) Rio de Janeiro | | July 9–11 | WW | 10 | United States |

=== U17 ===
| Year | Host | Venue | Dates | Style | Events | Team Champion |
|---|---|---|---|---|---|---|
| 2016 | (Peru) Lima | | July 1–3 | FS | 10 | United States |
| 2016 | (Peru) Lima | | July 1–3 | GR | 10 | United States |
| 2016 | (Peru) Lima | | July 1–3 | WW | 10 | United States |
| 2017 | (Argentina) Buenos Aires | | July 7–9 | FS | 10 | United States |
| 2017 | (Argentina) Buenos Aires | | July 7–9 | GR | 10 | United States |
| 2017 | (Argentina) Buenos Aires | | July 7–9 | WW | 10 | United States |
| 2018 | Guatemala City | | May 25–27 | FS | 10 | United States |
| 2018 | Guatemala City | | May 25–27 | GR | 10 | United States |
| 2018 | Guatemala City | | May 25–27 | WW | 10 | United States |
| 2019 | (Mexico) Morelia | | June 28–30 | FS | 10 | United States |
| 2019 | (Mexico) Morelia | | June 28–30 | GR | 10 | United States |
| 2019 | (Mexico) Morelia | | June 28–30 | WW | 10 | United States |
| 2021 | (Mexico) Oaxtepec | | June 9–13 | FS | 10 | United States |
| 2021 | (Mexico) Oaxtepec | | June 9–13 | GR | 10 | United States |
| 2021 | (Mexico) Oaxtepec | | June 9–13 | WW | 10 | United States |
| 2022 | (Argentina) Buenos Aires | | June 24–26 | FS | 10 | United States |
| 2022 | (Argentina) Buenos Aires | | June 24–26 | GR | 10 | United States |
| 2022 | (Argentina) Buenos Aires | | June 24–26 | WW | 10 | United States |
| 2023 | Mexico City | | June 22–24 | FS | 10 | United States |
| 2023 | Mexico City | | June 22–24 | GR | 10 | United States |
| 2023 | Mexico City | | June 22–24 | WW | 10 | United States |
| 2024 | (Dominican Republic) Santo Domingo | | June 27–29 | FS | 10 | United States |
| 2024 | (Dominican Republic) Santo Domingo | | June 27–29 | GR | 10 | United States |
| 2024 | (Dominican Republic) Santo Domingo | | June 27–29 | WW | 10 | United States |
| 2025 | (Brazil) Rio de Janeiro | | June 19–21 | FS | 10 | United States |
| 2025 | (Brazil) Rio de Janeiro | | June 19–21 | GR | 10 | United States |
| 2025 | (Brazil) Rio de Janeiro | | June 19–21 | WW | 10 | United States |
| 2026 | Panama City | | April 2–4 | FS | 10 | United States |
| 2026 | Panama City | | April 2–4 | GR | 10 | United States |
| 2026 | Panama City | | April 2–4 | WW | 10 | United States |

=== U15 ===
| Year | Host | Venue | Dates | Style | Events | Team Champion |
|---|---|---|---|---|---|---|
| 2018 | (Mexico) Villahermosa, Tabasco | | September 14 | FS | 10 | United States |
| 2018 | (Mexico) Villahermosa, Tabasco | | September 14 | GR | 10 | United States |
| 2018 | (Mexico) Villahermosa, Tabasco | | September 14 | WW | 10 | United States |
| 2019 | Panama City | | November 1–3 | FS | 10 | United States |
| 2019 | Panama City | | November 1–3 | GR | 10 | United States |
| 2019 | Panama City | | November 1–3 | WW | 10 | United States |
| 2022 | (Colombia) Apartado | | November 4–6 | FS | 10 | United States |
| 2022 | (Colombia) Apartado | | November 4–6 | GR | 10 | United States |
| 2022 | (Colombia) Apartado | | November 4–6 | WW | 10 | United States |
| 2023 | Panama City | | November 24–25 | FS | 10 | United States |
| 2023 | Panama City | | November 24–25 | GR | 10 | United States |
| 2023 | Panama City | | November 24–25 | WW | 10 | United States |
| 2024 | (El Salvador) San Salvador | | June 13–15 | FS | 10 | United States |
| 2024 | (El Salvador) San Salvador | | June 13–15 | GR | 10 | United States |
| 2024 | (El Salvador) San Salvador | | June 13–15 | WW | 10 | United States |
| 2025 | Guatemala City | | May 22–24 | FS | 10 | United States |
| 2025 | Guatemala City | | May 22–24 | GR | 10 | United States |
| 2025 | Guatemala City | | May 22–24 | WW | 10 | United States |
| 2026 | Mexico City | | July 23–25 | FS | 10 | United States |
| 2026 | Mexico City | | July 23–25 | GR | 10 | United States |
| 2026 | Mexico City | | July 23–25 | WW | 10 | United States |

=== Youth ===
Youth (Espoir) Pan American Wrestling Championships

| Year | Host | Venue | Dates | Style | Events | Team Champion |
|---|---|---|---|---|---|---|
| 1979 | (Mexico) Monterrey | | May 21 | GR | 10 | Canada |
| 1979 | (Mexico) Monterrey | | May 21 | FS | 10 | Cuba |
| 1982 | (Colombia) Cali | | July 17–20 | GR | 10 | United States |
| 1982 | (Colombia) Cali | | July 17–20 | FS | 10 | |

== Team titles ==
| Rank | Country | Senior | U23 | Junior (U20) | U17 | U15 | Youth | Total |
|---|---|---|---|---|---|---|---|---|
| 1 | United States | 63 | 8 | 47 | 30 | 21 | 1 | 170 |
| 2 | Cuba | 40 | 0 | 2 | 0 | 0 | 1 | 43 |
| 3 | Venezuela | 6 | 0 | 14 | 0 | 0 | 0 | 20 |
| 4 | Canada | 6 | 0 | 12 | 0 | 0 | 1 | 19 |
| 5 | Mexico | 0 | 1 | 3 | 0 | 0 | 0 | 4 |
| 6 | Colombia | 1 | 0 | 2 | 0 | 0 | 0 | 3 |
| 6 | Dominican Republic | 2 | 0 | 1 | 0 | 0 | 0 | 3 |
| 8 | Ecuador | 0 | 0 | 1 | 0 | 0 | 0 | 1 |

== See also ==
- Wrestling at the Pan American Games
- Pan American Judo Championships
