= 2022 U23 World Wrestling Championships – Women's freestyle 76 kg =

Wrestling competitions

Women's freestyle 76 kg at the 2022 U23 World Championships
- Venue: Pontevedra Municipal Sports Hall
- Dates: 19–20 October
- Competitors: 12 from 12 nations

Medalists
gold medal	Tatiana Rentería	Colombia
silver medal	Dymond Guilford	United States
bronze medal	Anastasiya Alpyeyeva	Ukraine
bronze medal	Yasuha Matsuyuki	Japan

The women's freestyle 72 kilograms is a competition featured at the 2022 U23 World Wrestling Championships, and was held in Pontevedra, Spain on 19 and 20 October 2022. The qualification rounds were held on 19 October while medal matches were held on the 2nd day of the competition. A total of 12 wrestlers competed in this event, limited to athletes whose body weight was less than 76 kilograms.

This freestyle wrestling competition consists of a single-elimination tournament, with a repechage used to determine the winner of two bronze medals. The two finalists face off for gold and silver medals. Each wrestler who loses to one of the two finalists moves into the repechage, culminating in a pair of bronze medal matches featuring the semifinal losers each facing the remaining repechage opponent from their half of the bracket.

== Results ==
Legend

- F — Won by fall

=== Main bracket ===
Round of 16
Carla Lera (ESP)	2
Anastasiya Alpyeyeva (UKR)	5
Chang Hui-tsz (TPE)	3
Tatiana Rentería (COL)	3
Inkara Zhanatayeva (KAZ)	3
Luz María Hernández (MEX)	0
Dymond Guilford (USA)	10
Daniela Tkachuk (POL)	0

Quarterfinals
Marion Bye (NOR)	0
Anastasiya Alpyeyeva (UKR)	4^{F}
Tatiana Rentería (COL)	10
Mehtap Gültekin (TUR)	0
Amelia Frisbee (CAN)	0
Inkara Zhanatayeva (KAZ)	5
Dymond Guilford (USA)	6
Yasuha Matsuyuki (JPN)	1

Semifinals
Anastasiya Alpyeyeva (UKR)	1
Tatiana Rentería (COL)	4
Inkara Zhanatayeva (KAZ)	0
Dymond Guilford (USA)	11

Final
Tatiana Rentería (COL)	2
Dymond Guilford (USA)	1

=== Repechage ===
Repechage round
Chang Hui-tsz (TPE)	2
Mehtap Gültekin (TUR)	4
Daniela Tkachuk (POL)	2
Yasuha Matsuyuki (JPN)	12

Bronze medals
Mehtap Gültekin (TUR)	1
Anastasiya Alpyeyeva (UKR)	5
Yasuha Matsuyuki (JPN)	7^{F}
Inkara Zhanatayeva (KAZ)	0

== Final standing ==
Rank	Athlete
1st place, gold medalist(s)	Tatiana Rentería (COL)
2nd place, silver medalist(s)	Dymond Guilford (USA)
3rd place, bronze medalist(s)	Anastasiya Alpyeyeva (UKR)
3rd place, bronze medalist(s)	Yasuha Matsuyuki (JPN)
5	Mehtap Gültekin (TUR)
5	Inkara Zhanatayeva (KAZ)
7	Chang Hui-tsz (TPE)
8	Carla Lera (ESP)
9	Daniela Tkachuk (POL)
10	Luz María Hernández (MEX)
11	Marion Bye (NOR)
12	Amelia Frisbee (CAN)
