= 2023 U15 Pan American Wrestling Championships =

Wrestling event in Panama City, Panama

- Host city: Panama City, Panama
- Dates: 24-25 November 2023

Champions
- Freestyle: United States
- Greco-Roman: United States
- Women: United States

The 2023 U15 Pan American Wrestling Championships was the 4th edition of U15 Pan American Wrestling Championships of combined events, and it was held from 24 to 25 November in Panama City, Panama.

== Medal summary ==
=== Men's freestyle ===
Event	Gold	Silver	Bronze
38 kg	Chase Karenbauer; United States	Ronald Morales Garcia; Ecuador	Cristhian Cevallos Espana; Ecuador
41 kg	Keegan Bassett; United States	Jose Quintero Alonso; Mexico	Allan Jimenez Franco; Ecuador
41 kg	Keegan Bassett; United States	Jose Quintero Alonso; Mexico	Jesuan Morales Pacheco; Puerto Rico
44 kg	Frederick Bachmann Jr. Puerto Rico	Jorge Rios; Mexico	Dylan Narvaez Camacho; Ecuador
44 kg	Frederick Bachmann Jr. Puerto Rico	Jorge Rios; Mexico	Elijah Herring; United States
48 kg	Joseph Bachmann; Puerto Rico	Rocco Cassioppi; United States	Jhon Ramírez; Colombia
48 kg	Joseph Bachmann; Puerto Rico	Rocco Cassioppi; United States	Andre Huarcaya Lopez; Peru
52 kg	Christopher Grossman; United States	Edwin Morales Pacheco; Puerto Rico	Deivid Erazo; Colombia
52 kg	Christopher Grossman; United States	Edwin Morales Pacheco; Puerto Rico	Arthur Dos Santos; Brazil
57 kg	Austin Collins; United States	Braylon Gonzalez; Puerto Rico	David Maldonado Melendez; Puerto Rico
57 kg	Austin Collins; United States	Braylon Gonzalez; Puerto Rico	Percyvall Jibaja Zazzali; Peru
62 kg	Yandro Soto Rivera; Puerto Rico	Travis Cardenas; United States	Luis Medellin Hernandez; Mexico
62 kg	Yandro Soto Rivera; Puerto Rico	Travis Cardenas; United States	Anthony Molina Rubio; Peru
68 kg	Cooper Rowe; United States	Joab Carrillo Rodriguez; Puerto Rico	Daniel Tejada Rivera; Honduras
68 kg	Cooper Rowe; United States	Joab Carrillo Rodriguez; Puerto Rico	Antonio Arguello Belcolore; El Salvador
75 kg	Isai Fernandez; United States	Kawayran Vazquez Jr; Puerto Rico	Arat Gonzalez Castro; Mexico
75 kg	Isai Fernandez; United States	Kawayran Vazquez Jr; Puerto Rico	Fernando Bencke Brandao Lopes Dias; Brazil
85 kg	Evan Perez; United States	Brandon Hernandez Ramirez; Mexico	Thierry Miranda Martillo; Ecuador

=== Men's Greco-Roman ===
Event	Gold	Silver	Bronze
38 kg	Chase Karenbauer; United States	Ronald Morales Garcia; Ecuador	Hector Aguilar Rodriguez; Mexico
41 kg	Keegan Bassett; United States	Allan Jimenez Franco; Ecuador	Cristofer Quintero Alonso; Mexico
41 kg	Keegan Bassett; United States	Allan Jimenez Franco; Ecuador	Jiug Alvarez Arballo; Mexico
44 kg	Frederick Bachmann Jr; Puerto Rico	Manuel Garcia Reasco; Ecuador	Dylan Narvaez Camacho; Ecuador
44 kg	Frederick Bachmann Jr; Puerto Rico	Manuel Garcia Reasco; Ecuador	Elijah Herring; United States
48 kg	Joseph Bachmann; Puerto Rico	Rocco Cassioppi; United States	Erick Choc Choc; Guatemala
48 kg	Joseph Bachmann; Puerto Rico	Rocco Cassioppi; United States	Andre Huarcaya Lopez; Peru
52 kg	Christopher Grossman; United States	Luis Ramírez; Colombia	Felipe Cisneros Nunez; Mexico
52 kg	Christopher Grossman; United States	Luis Ramírez; Colombia	Yuri Landim Ribeiro; Brazil
57 kg	Austin Collins; United States	Braylon Gonzalez; Puerto Rico	Zeus Gonzalez Gonzalez; Mexico
57 kg	Austin Collins; United States	Braylon Gonzalez; Puerto Rico	Percyvali Jibaja Zazzali; Peru
62 kg	Markuz Gaytan Rodriguez; Mexico	Yandro Soto Rivera; Puerto Rico	Travis Cardenas; United States
62 kg	Markuz Gaytan Rodriguez; Mexico	Yandro Soto Rivera; Puerto Rico	Juan Ororzco Perez; Ecuador
68 kg	Cooper Rowe; United States	Joao Montesinos Macedo; Peru	Jostyn Salvatierra Baque; Ecuador
68 kg	Cooper Rowe; United States	Joao Montesinos Macedo; Peru	Heder Saldana Bernardo; Mexico
75 kg	Isai Fernandez; United States	Kawayran Vazquez Jr; Puerto Rico	Diego Campos Arizpe; Mexico
75 kg	Isai Fernandez; United States	Kawayran Vazquez Jr; Puerto Rico	Fernando Bencke Brandao Lopes Dias; Brazil
85 kg	Evan Perez; United States	Ricardo Rendon Martinez; Mexico	Thierry Miranda Martillo; Ecuador
85 kg	Evan Perez; United States	Ricardo Rendon Martinez; Mexico	John Saenz Corea; Guatemala

=== Women ===
Event	Gold	Silver	Bronze
33 kg	Maisie Elliott; United States	Katherine Gutierrez Munoz; Ecuador	Not awarded
36 kg	Corangelys Kuilan; Puerto Rico	Sareth Manjarres Cerezo; Ecuador	Timmery Condit; United States
39 kg	Gail Sullivan; United States	Indra Trejo Jimenez; Mexico	Kristel Sosa Carpio; Ecuador
42 kg	Hailey Delgado; United States	Alejandra Salinas Betancourt; Chile	Xiomara Meza Alava; Ecuador
42 kg	Hailey Delgado; United States	Alejandra Salinas Betancourt; Chile	Heilyn Aguirre; Colombia
46 kg	Epenesa Elison; United States	Camila Pachas Huaroto; Peru	Maylin Escobar Marroquin; Guatemala
46 kg	Epenesa Elison; United States	Camila Pachas Huaroto; Peru	Miayalee Ortiz Martinez; Puerto Rico
50 kg	Kayla Batres; United States	Aneishka Santos Baez; Puerto Rico	Danna Chavez Martinez; Mexico
50 kg	Kayla Batres; United States	Aneishka Santos Baez; Puerto Rico	Clara Ramirez Guardia; Peru
54 kg	Kaylyn Harrill; United States	Luisianna Naviua Corozo; Ecuador	Alejandra Serrano; Colombia
54 kg	Kaylyn Harrill; United States	Luisianna Naviua Corozo; Ecuador	Savannah Arroyo; Puerto Rico
58 kg	Amayamarie Hinojosa; United States	Camila Chasipanta Sandoval; Ecuador	Yasmim Oliveira Santos; Brazil
58 kg	Amayamarie Hinojosa; United States	Camila Chasipanta Sandoval; Ecuador	Kristeen Olaya Piza; Ecuador
62 kg	Taina Fernandez; United States	Meissy Valdez Obando; Guatemala	Sylvua Espinosa Muniz; Mexico
62 kg	Taina Fernandez; United States	Meissy Valdez Obando; Guatemala	Linda Martinez Armenta; Mexico
66 kg	Violette Lasure; United States	Mayara Oliveira Santos; Brazil	Maria Paz Rangel; Mexico

== Medal table ==
* Host nation (Panama)

Rank	Nation	Gold	Silver	Bronze	Total
1	United States	23	3	4	30
2	Puerto Rico	6	8	4	18
3	Mexico	1	5	13	19
4	Ecuador	0	8	11	19
5	Peru	0	2	6	8
6	Brazil	0	1	5	6
7	Colombia	0	1	4	5
8	Guatemala	0	1	3	4
9	Chile	0	1	0	1
10	El Salvador	0	0	1	1
10	Honduras	0	0	1	1
Totals (11 entries)		30	30	52	112

== Team ranking ==
Rank	Men's freestyle		Men's Greco-Roman		Women's freestyle	
Rank	Team	Points	Team	Points	Team	Points
1	United States	230	United States	225	United States	240
2	Puerto Rico	179	Mexico	153	Ecuador	120
3	Mexico	114	Puerto Rico	148	Puerto Rico	93
4	Ecuador	93	Ecuador	117	Mexico	89
5	Peru	65	Peru	76	Colombia	76
6	Brazil	64	Panama	61	Brazil	65
7	Panama	58	Colombia	54	Peru	43
8	Colombia	48	Brazil	38	Guatemala	39
9	El Salvador	29	Guatemala	30	Chile	30
10	Honduras	15	Chile	8	Panama	22
11	Chile	10	El Salvador	4	Honduras	9
12	Barbados	9	Barbados Honduras	0	Barbados	6
13	Argentina	8			{{}}	
