= 2019 U20 Pan American Wrestling Championships =

- Host city: Guatemala City, Guatemala
- Dates: 5–7 June 2019

Champions
- Freestyle: United States
- Greco-Roman: United States
- Women: United States

The 2019 U20 Pan American Wrestling Championships was held from 5 to 7 June in Guatemala City, Guatemala.

== Medal summary ==
=== Men's freestyle ===
Event	Gold	Silver	Bronze
57 kg	Trevor Mastrogiovanni; United States	Elkin España; Colombia	Brayden Todd; Canada
57 kg	Trevor Mastrogiovanni; United States	Elkin España; Colombia	Lucas Navarrete Vidal; Ecuador
61 kg	Roman Bravo-Young; United States	Carlos Mendoza Pena; Mexico	Esteban Perez Castellanos; Guatemala
65 kg	Cristian Solenzal Lopez; Cuba	Real Woods; United States	Eduardo Ayala Pena; El Salvador
65 kg	Cristian Solenzal Lopez; Cuba	Real Woods; United States	Francisco Gonzalez Torres; Mexico
70 kg	Peyton Robb; United States	Diego Sandoval Zarco; Mexico	Connor Quinton; Canada
70 kg	Peyton Robb; United States	Diego Sandoval Zarco; Mexico	Sergio Godoy Vite; Ecuador
74 kg	Danny Braunagel; United States	Raul Palacios Dominguez; Mexico	Pedro Araujo Campos; Brazil
79 kg	Shane Griffith; United States	Carson Lee; Canada	Miguel Ornelas Reynoso; Mexico
79 kg	Shane Griffith; United States	Carson Lee; Canada	Giovanni De Oliveira Gaion Piazza; Brazil
86 kg	Zachary Braunagel; United States	Arturo Silot Torres; Cuba	Gino Avila Dilber; Honduras
92 kg	Yonger Bastida Pomares; Cuba	Jakob Woodley; United States	Josue Campos Arizpe; Mexico
97 kg	Tanner Sloan; United States	Ikjyot Randhawa; Canada	Victor Mancheno Jumbo; Ecuador
125 kg	Seth Nevills; United States	Jackson Serna; Canada	Steeven Yepez Penafiel; Ecuador

=== Men's Greco-Roman ===
Event	Gold	Silver	Bronze
55 kg	Duvan Sánchez; Colombia	Antonio Ruiz Mora; Ecuador	Oseas Lorenzo Bautista; Guatemala
55 kg	Duvan Sánchez; Colombia	Antonio Ruiz Mora; Ecuador	William Sullivan Iv; United States
60 kg	Andrés Cortés; Colombia	Haiden Drury; United States	Emerson Felipe Ordonez; Guatemala
63 kg	Hunter Lewis; United States	Carlos González; Colombia	Cristian Mejia Tepen; Guatemala
67 kg	Damian Solenzal Lopez; Cuba	Diego Martinez De Leija; Mexico	Benjamin Peak; United States
67 kg	Damian Solenzal Lopez; Cuba	Diego Martinez De Leija; Mexico	Julián Horta; Colombia
72 kg	Evaristo Hernandez Reyna; Mexico	Franco Chialanza; Argentina	Ryan Cubas Castillo; Peru
77 kg	Emmanuel Benitez Castro; Mexico	Isaiah Alford; United States	Miguel Silva Coc; Peru
82 kg	Arturo Camacho Valenciano; Mexico	Maxwell Wohlabaugh; United States	Fabian Castillo Pavez; Chile
87 kg	Jesus Lopez Nino; Mexico	Keaton Fanning; United States	Johan Naveda Vargas; Peru
97 kg	Gabriel Rosillo Kindelan; Cuba	Braxton Amos; United States	Fabio Conceicao Rodrigues; Brazil
130 kg	Lewis Herrington; United States	Diego Almendras Rodriguez; Chile	Samir Vargas; Colombia

=== Women ===
Event	Gold	Silver	Bronze
50 kg	Lucía Yépez; Ecuador	Emily Shilson; United States	Evelyn Matos Santos; Brazil
53 kg	Laura Herin Avila; Cuba	Tiare Ike; United States	Becky Cornejo Munoz; Ecuador
55 kg	Alisha Howk; United States	Nathaly Herrera Huacre; Peru	Virginie Kaze Gascon; Canada
57 kg	Ana Pereira Franca; Brazil	Gabrielle Skidmore; United States	Jolie Brisco; Canada
59 kg	Katherine Rentería; Colombia	Emma Parker; Canada	Mia Macaluso; United States
62 kg	Dayselis Rodriguez Garcia; Cuba	Alexandria Liles; United States	Meiriele Charamba Santos Hora; Brazil
65 kg	Cara Broadus; United States	Jamilex Cumbicos Castillo; Ecuador	Katie Mulkay; Canada
68 kg	Thamires Martins Machado; Brazil	Alma Mendoz; United States	Berit Johnson; Canada
72 kg	Tatiana Rentería; Colombia	Dymond Guilford; United States	Lily French; Canada
76 kg	Kenya Sloan; United States	Milaimys Marin Potrille; Cuba	Jasmine Thebeau; Canada

== Medal table ==
* Host nation (Guatemala)

Rank	Nation	Gold	Silver	Bronze	Total
1	United States	13	13	3	29
2	Cuba	6	2	0	8
3	Mexico	4	4	3	11
4	Colombia	4	2	2	8
5	Brazil	2	0	5	7
6	Ecuador	1	2	5	8
7	Canada	0	4	8	12
8	Peru	0	1	3	4
9	Chile	0	1	1	2
10	Argentina	0	1	0	1
11	Guatemala*	0	0	4	4
12	El Salvador	0	0	1	1
12	Honduras	0	0	1	1
Totals (13 entries)		30	30	36	96

== Team ranking ==
Rank	Men's freestyle		Men's Greco-Roman		Women's freestyle	
Rank	Team	Points	Team	Points	Team	Points
1	United States	240	United States	190	United States	210
2	Canada	120	Mexico	130	Canada	134
3	Mexico	113	Colombia	122	Brazil	102
4	Ecuador	102	Ecuador	84	Ecuador	72
5	Cuba	70	Peru	80	Cuba	70
6	Brazil	59	Guatemala	60	Colombia	50
7	Guatemala	51	Cuba	50	Peru	42
8	Peru	38	Panama	48	Panama	31
9	Panama	34	Chile	45	Guatemala	24
10	Colombia	30	Argentina	30	Argentina	22
11	El Salvador Honduras	15	Brazil	27	Chile	12
12	—		Bolivia	10	Bolivia	10
13	Argentina Bolivia Costa Rica	10	Canada	8	El Salvador	8
14	—		Nicaragua	6		
15	—		Honduras	4		
16	Chile Nicaragua	6				
17	—					
18	Suriname	4				
19	Paraguay	2				
