= 2024 U15 Pan American Wrestling Championships =

- Host city: San Salvador, El Salvador
- Dates: 13–15 June 2024

Champions
- Freestyle: United States
- Greco-Roman: United States
- Women: United States

The 2024 U15 Pan American Wrestling Championships was the 5th edition of U15 Pan American Wrestling Championships of combined events, and it was held from 13 to 15 June in San Salvador, El Salvador.

== Medal summary ==
=== Men's freestyle ===
Event	Gold	Silver	Bronze
38 kg	Evan Restivo; United States	Ronald Morales Garcia; Ecuador	Christhian Leiha Alor; Mexico
38 kg	Evan Restivo; United States	Ronald Morales Garcia; Ecuador	Duglas Urrutia Ramos; Guatemala
41 kg	Keegan Bassett; United States	Eydan Lezcano Castillo; Panama	Israel Amaro Garcia; Mexico
41 kg	Keegan Bassett; United States	Eydan Lezcano Castillo; Panama	Joshua Gargias Sanchez; Mexico
44 kg	Chase Karenbauer; United States	Francesko Canayo Ipushima; Peru	Santiago Cortez Martinez; Mexico
44 kg	Chase Karenbauer; United States	Francesko Canayo Ipushima; Peru	Jorge Borges Da Silva; Brazil
48 kg	William Soto; Puerto Rico	Noe Ochoa Olvera; Mexico	Mateo Gallegos; United States
48 kg	William Soto; Puerto Rico	Noe Ochoa Olvera; Mexico	Jan Franco Acho; Peru
52 kg	Reece Movahead; United States	Oziel Herrera Mallqui; Peru	Santiago Chrisjohn; Argentina
52 kg	Reece Movahead; United States	Oziel Herrera Mallqui; Peru	Franco Taboada Avalos; Peru
57 kg	Thomas Banas; United States	Dylan Fernandez; El Salvador	Lavozier Eadik Maruso; Brazil
57 kg	Thomas Banas; United States	Dylan Fernandez; El Salvador	Luciano Estrada Martinez; Mexico
62 kg	Jovani Solis; Puerto Rico	David Maldonado Melendez; Puerto Rico	Francisco Martinez Juarez; Mexico
62 kg	Jovani Solis; Puerto Rico	David Maldonado Melendez; Puerto Rico	Justus Heeg; United States
68 kg	Camryn Howard; United States	Joab Carrillo Rodriguez; Puerto Rico	Stephen Castillo Alvarado; Mexico
68 kg	Camryn Howard; United States	Joab Carrillo Rodriguez; Puerto Rico	Antonio Arguello Belcolore; El Salvador
75 kg	Mario Hutcherson; United States	Layden Acevedo Cordero; Puerto Rico	Benjamin Casas Vaquel; Argentina
85 kg	Carson Langford; United States	Allan De Sousa Beserra; Brazil	Leonel Rivas Guzman; El Salvador

=== Men's Greco-Roman ===
Event	Gold	Silver	Bronze
38 kg	Evan Restivo; United States	Ronald Morales Garcia; Ecuador	William Coh Cauich; Mexico
38 kg	Evan Restivo; United States	Ronald Morales Garcia; Ecuador	Chase Millan; Puerto Rico
41 kg	Keegan Bassett; United States	Hector Aguilar Rodriguez; Mexico	Maddox Millan; Puerto Rico
44 kg	Chase Karenbauer; United States	Francesko Canayo Ipushima; Peru	Jiug Alvarez Arballo; Mexico
44 kg	Chase Karenbauer; United States	Francesko Canayo Ipushima; Peru	Axe Granados Maldonado; Mexico
48 kg	Mateo Gallegos; United States	William Soto; Puerto Rico	Isaac Gomez Iglesias; Mexico
48 kg	Mateo Gallegos; United States	William Soto; Puerto Rico	Manuel Garcia Reasco; Ecuador
52 kg	Reece Movahead; United States	Daniel Jacobo Garcia; Mexico	Adrian Canales Perez; El Salvador
52 kg	Reece Movahead; United States	Daniel Jacobo Garcia; Mexico	Alexis Campillo Lopez; Mexico
57 kg	Thomas Banas; United States	Bruno Casas Ochoa; Peru	Victor Rojas Quispe; Peru
57 kg	Thomas Banas; United States	Bruno Casas Ochoa; Peru	Lavozier Wadik Maruso; Brazil
62 kg	Raul Castillo Molina; Mexico	Justus Heeg; United States	Jovani Solis; Puerto Rico
62 kg	Raul Castillo Molina; Mexico	Justus Heeg; United States	David Maldonado Melendez; Puerto Rico
68 kg	Camryn Howard; United States	Joab Carrillo Rodriguez; Puerto Rico	Adrian Riques Morales; Peru
68 kg	Camryn Howard; United States	Joab Carrillo Rodriguez; Puerto Rico	Antonio Arguello Belcolore; El Salvador
75 kg	Mario Hutcherson; United States	Layden Acevedo Cordero; Puerto Rico	Benjamin Casas Vaque; Argentina
85 kg	Carson Langford; United States	Jose Esparza Ordonez; Mexico	Santiago Gutierrez Garcia; Mexico

=== Women ===
Event	Gold	Silver	Bronze
33 kg	Shirley Meza Alava; Ecuador	Victoria Rivera Diaz; Puerto Rico	Lanaia Selig; United States
36 kg	Abigail Peterson; United States	Rubi Aguilar Montejo; Mexico	Amber Martinez Salinas; Mexico
39 kg	Olivia Hernandez; United States	Katia Ramos Espinosa; Mexico	Citlalli Garcia Alvarez; Mexico
42 kg	Isla Silva; United States	Xiomara Meza Alava; Ecuador	Edmarie Sierra Moreno; Puerto Rico
46 kg	Paris Soria; United States	Julia Freires Cardoso; Brazil	Briseida Adan Pacheco; Mexico
46 kg	Paris Soria; United States	Julia Freires Cardoso; Brazil	Aleeza Bernal Yerena; Mexico
50 kg	Epenesa Elison; United States	Clara Ramirez Guardia; Peru	Azumi Arenas Cuadras; Mexico
50 kg	Epenesa Elison; United States	Clara Ramirez Guardia; Peru	Sofia De Jesus Nussa; Puerto Rico
54 kg	Carolyn Geckler; United States	Camila Perez Tejada Prieto; Mexico	Corina Santillan Vera; Mexico
54 kg	Carolyn Geckler; United States	Camila Perez Tejada Prieto; Mexico	Fernanda Riffo Catalan; Chile
58 kg	Victoria Carbonaro; United States	Ximena Dominguez Revueltas; Mexico	Lorena Caldas De Oliveira Martins; Brazil
62 kg	Taina Fernandez; United States	Yolayni Rosado Valerio; Dominican Republic	Sylvia Espinosa Muniz; Mexico
66 kg	Ava Guilmette; United States	Eyshila Lopes Ribeiro; Brazil	Allison Ojeda Quito; Ecuador

== Medal table ==
* Host nation (El Salvador)

Rank	Nation	Gold	Silver	Bronze	Total
1	United States	26	1	3	30
2	Puerto Rico	2	7	6	15
3	Mexico	1	8	20	29
4	Ecuador	1	3	2	6
5	Peru	0	5	4	9
6	Brazil	0	3	4	7
7	El Salvador*	0	1	4	5
8	Dominican Republic	0	1	0	1
8	Panama	0	1	0	1
10	Argentina	0	0	3	3
11	Chile	0	0	1	1
11	Guatemala	0	0	1	1
Totals (12 entries)		30	30	48	108

== Team ranking ==
Rank	Men's freestyle		Men's Greco-Roman		Women's freestyle	
Rank	Team	Points	Team	Points	Team	Points
1	United States	230	United States	245	United States	240
2	Puerto Rico	132	Mexico	144	Mexico	137
3	Mexico	128	Puerto Rico	124	Puerto Rico	102
4	Peru	79	Peru	81	Ecuador	69
5	El Salvador	74	Ecuador	67	Brazil	65
6	Brazil	68	El Salvador	44	Panama	44
7	Panama	60	Panama	44	Peru	40
8	Ecuador	47	Brazil	37	El Salvador	37
9	Guatemala	45	Guatemala	34	Guatemala	35
10	Argentina	34	Argentina	23	Honduras	33
11	Chile	10	Chile	22	Chile	27
12	Honduras Nicaragua	6	Nicaragua	12	Dominican Republic	20
13			Honduras	2	Nicaragua	10
