= 2018 U15 Pan American Wrestling Championships =

- Host city: (Mexico) Villahermosa, Tabasco
- Dates: 14 September 2018

Champions
- Freestyle: United States
- Greco-Roman: United States
- Women: United States

The 2018 U15 Pan American Wrestling Championships was the 1st edition of U15 Pan American Wrestling Championships of combined events, and it was held from 14 September in Villahermosa, Tabasco, Mexico.

== Medal summary ==
=== Men's freestyle ===
Event	Gold	Silver	Bronze
38 kg	Kael Lauridsen; United States	Angel Gabriel Lavat Cortez; Mexico	Not awarded
41 kg	Marc-Anthony McGowan; United States	Luisaldo Cortez Garcia; Mexico	Erick Baita; Panama
44 kg	Clarence Moore; United States	Axel Nataneal Medrano Garcia; Mexico	Elvis Batista; Panama
48 kg	Brennan Van Hoecke; United States	Becker Melgarejo Ramos; Peru	Raul Guajardo Garcia; Mexico
52 kg	Brock Bobzien; United States	Roberto Carlos Martinez Armenta; Mexico	Enrique Herrera Huacre; Peru
57 kg	Jan Lopez Solis; Mexico	Jadon Skellenger; United States	Aseph Sanchez Huaroto; Peru
62 kg	Drake Buchanan; United States	Carlos Eduardo Serrano Lopez; Mexico	Alexander Cusinga Gomez; Peru
68 kg	Nicholas Hall; United States	Obed Rodolpho Rodriguez Tapia; Mexico	Alexandro Yaranga Espinoza; Peru
75 kg	Ashton Davis; United States	Kevin Ozmar de Leon Trevino; Mexico	Roberto Human Aguilar; Peru
85 kg	Quentin Saunders; United States	Ignacio Mata Diaz; Mexico	Diego Nole Azabache; Peru

=== Men's Greco-Roman ===
Event	Gold	Silver	Bronze
38 kg	Kael Lauridsen; United States	Not awarded	
41 kg	Marc-Anthony McGowan; United States	Marco Antonio Garcia Alvares; Mexico	Abel Sanchez Juarez; Peru
44 kg	Clarence Moore; United States	Eliseo Barac Aguilar Garcia; Mexico	Not awarded
48 kg	Brennan Van Hoecke; United States	Erik Ivan Godinez Bravo; Mexico	Becker Melgarejo Ramos; Peru
52 kg	Brock Bobzien; United States	Ariel Omar Teh Catzin; Mexico	Edwin Allain Miranda; Peru
57 kg	Daniel Lopez Avila; Mexico	Jadon Skellenger; United States	Wilfredo Somaniego; Panama
62 kg	Leag Gael Guzman Padilla; Mexico	Drake Buchanan; United States	Dario Cubas Castillo; Peru
68 kg	Raul Patricio Unzueta Torres; Mexico	Nicholas Hall; United States	Alexandro Yaranga Espinoza; Peru
75 kg	Alan Micheel Urbina Gonzalez; Mexico	Ashton Davis; United States	Roberto Human Aguilar; Peru
85 kg	Quentin Saunders; United States	Jorge De la O Olan; Mexico	Diego Nole Azabache; Peru

=== Women ===
Event	Gold	Silver	Bronze
33 kg	Valerie Hamilton; United States	Natalia Lineth Avila; Mexico	Not awarded
36 kg	Madison Wellen; United States	Ana Sofia Palacios Hernandez; Mexico	Not awarded
39 kg	Alexandra Szkotnicki; United States	Ileana Aguilar Gonzalez; Mexico	Anett Huaman Mallqui; Peru
42 kg	Keily Tabaldo; United States	Nevis Milena Rodriguez Cantu; Mexico	Not awarded
46 kg	Cristelle Rodriguez; United States	Andrea Margot Avelino Barrientos; Mexico	Andrea Toribio Torres; Peru
50 kg	Melanie Nahomi Jimenez Villalba; Mexico	Jennifer Soto; United States	Selena Rojas Astoray; Peru
54 kg	Korina Blades; United States	Dulce Del Carmen Mora Mena; Mexico	Not awarded
58 kg	Destiny Rodriguez; United States	Bertha Daniela Rojas Chavez; Mexico	Not awarded
62 kg	Lillian Freitas; United States	Andrea Martinez De Leon; Mexico	Bianca Cruz Zapata; Peru
66 kg	Amit Elor; United States	Jesabel Ortega Munoz; Mexico	Not awarded

== Medal table ==
* Host nation (Mexico)

Rank	Nation	Gold	Silver	Bronze	Total
1	United States	24	6	0	30
2	Mexico*	6	22	1	29
3	Peru	0	1	17	18
4	Panama	0	0	3	3
Totals (4 entries)		30	29	21	80

== Team ranking ==
Rank	Men's freestyle		Men's Greco-Roman		Women's freestyle	
Rank	Team	Points	Team	Points	Team	Points
1	United States	245	United States	230	United States	245
2	Mexico	200	Mexico	200	Mexico	205
3	Peru	122	Peru	117	Peru	60
4	Panama	40	Panama	27	Panama	24
5	Nicaragua	12	Nicaragua	10		
