= 2026 U17 Pan American Wrestling Championships =

- Host city: Panama City
- Dates: 2–4 April 2026

Champions
- Freestyle: United States
- Greco-Roman: United States
- Women: United States

The 2026 U17 Pan American Wrestling Championships was held from 2 to 4 April in Panama City, Panama.

== Medal summary ==
=== Men's freestyle ===
Event	Gold	Silver	Bronze
45 kg	Rylen Wax; United States	Fernando Jimeno Mendizabal; Peru	Nelson Villafane III; Puerto Rico
45 kg	Rylen Wax; United States	Fernando Jimeno Mendizabal; Peru	Osnel Tovar Romero; Venezuela
48 kg	Lucas Forman; United States	Israel Amaro Garcia; Mexico	Jack Aucoin; Canada
51 kg	Evan Restivo; United States	Bryan Hernandez Hernandez; Mexico	David Morales; Colombia
51 kg	Evan Restivo; United States	Bryan Hernandez Hernandez; Mexico	William Soto; Puerto Rico
55 kg	Jeremy Carver; United States	Jovanni Tovar; Colombia	Edgar Bocanegra Segura; Mexico
55 kg	Jeremy Carver; United States	Jovanni Tovar; Colombia	Jonrex Casa; Canada
60 kg	Cooper Mathews; United States	Wilfredo Rodriguez Gonzalez; Venezuela	Adrian Canales Perez; El Salvador
60 kg	Cooper Mathews; United States	Wilfredo Rodriguez Gonzalez; Venezuela	Andrew Gomez; Puerto Rico
65 kg	Jovani Solis; Puerto Rico	Alisson Goncalves Da Silva; Brazil	Joaquin Chacon; United States
65 kg	Jovani Solis; Puerto Rico	Alisson Goncalves Da Silva; Brazil	Ignacio Figueroa Torres; Chile
71 kg	Jerin Coles; Canada	Aiden Arnett; United States	Isaque De Sa Barbatto; Brazil
71 kg	Jerin Coles; Canada	Aiden Arnett; United States	Antonio Arguello Belcolore; El Salvador
80 kg	Ryder Schulte; United States	Franklin Peters; Canada	Cassiano Zuse Picolotto; Brazil
80 kg	Ryder Schulte; United States	Franklin Peters; Canada	Layden Acevedo Cordero; Puerto Rico
92 kg	Salah Tsarni; United States	Tyler Langford; Canada	Alan Garcia Morales; Puerto Rico
92 kg	Salah Tsarni; United States	Tyler Langford; Canada	Alvaro Villa Aviles; Peru
110 kg	Lucas Feuerbach; United States	Udaypartap Billen; Canada	Luis Ibarra Ibarra; Mexico

=== Men's Greco-Roman ===
Event	Gold	Silver	Bronze
45 kg	Rylen Wax; United States	Nelson Villafane III; Puerto Rico	Fernando Jimeno Mendizabal; Peru
48 kg	Lucas Forman; United States	Hector Aguilar Rodriguez; Mexico	Jules Casalino Berrocal; Peru
48 kg	Lucas Forman; United States	Hector Aguilar Rodriguez; Mexico	Ronald Morales Garcia; Ecuador
51 kg	Evan Restivo; United States	Emiliano Garcia Yepez; Ecuador	Axe Granados Maldonado; Mexico
55 kg	Haniel Rodriguez Nolaya; Venezuela	Lavozier Wadik Maruso; Brazil	Uriel Plaza Sanchez; Mexico
55 kg	Haniel Rodriguez Nolaya; Venezuela	Lavozier Wadik Maruso; Brazil	Jeremy Carver; United States
60 kg	Cooper Mathews; United States	Ryan Zamprogno Freire; Brazil	Guillermo Chavarria Rosales; Guatemala
60 kg	Cooper Mathews; United States	Ryan Zamprogno Freire; Brazil	Sebastian Torregrosa Gonzalez; Puerto Rico
65 kg	Raul Castillo Molina; Mexico	Joaquin Chacon; United States	Emanuel Pineda Cruz; Guatemala
65 kg	Raul Castillo Molina; Mexico	Joaquin Chacon; United States	Victor Nascimento Dos Santos; Brazil
71 kg	David Maldonado Melendez; Puerto Rico	Aiden Arnett; United States	Fabian Cordova Cova; Venezuela
71 kg	David Maldonado Melendez; Puerto Rico	Aiden Arnett; United States	Cristobal Aliaga Candia; Chile
80 kg	Ryder Schulte; United States	Lhyam Gracia Estupinan; Ecuador	Layden Acevedo Cordero; Puerto Rico
80 kg	Ryder Schulte; United States	Lhyam Gracia Estupinan; Ecuador	Emmanuel Rosa Soriano; Dominican Republic
92 kg	Salah Tsarni; United States	Jose Esparza Ordonez; Mexico	Alan Garcia Morales; Puerto Rico
110 kg	Lucas Feuerbach; United States	Luiz Pinheiro Pires; Brazil	Yerik Cordero Ortiz; Puerto Rico

=== Women ===
Event	Gold	Silver	Bronze
40 kg	Sophia Valdez; United States	Shirley Meza Alava; Ecuador	Rubi Aguilar Montejo; Mexico
43 kg	Karen Rios Silva; Mexico	Abigail Peterson; United States	Maya Naicker; Canada
43 kg	Karen Rios Silva; Mexico	Abigail Peterson; United States	Valery Rubio; Colombia
46 kg	Aleyvi Celis Vazquez; Mexico	Andrea Flores Flores; Honduras	Olivia Hernandez; United States
46 kg	Aleyvi Celis Vazquez; Mexico	Andrea Flores Flores; Honduras	Ammy Tigaci Alcivar; Ecuador
49 kg	Hailey Delgado; United States	Asia Sanchez Maldonado; Venezuela	Laura Zamora; Colombia
49 kg	Hailey Delgado; United States	Asia Sanchez Maldonado; Venezuela	Xiomara Meza Alava; Ecuador
53 kg	Aubree Gutierrez; United States	Lauren Macgregor; Canada	Stacy Rodriguez Tello; Peru
57 kg	Aleia Apostol; United States	Gurleen Dhillon; Canada	Laynne Ferreira Tolosa; Brazil
57 kg	Aleia Apostol; United States	Gurleen Dhillon; Canada	Valentina Padron Talavera; Mexico
61 kg	Landri Von Gonten; United States	Valentina Gomez Juarez; Mexico	Marisa Iturrino; Puerto Rico
61 kg	Landri Von Gonten; United States	Valentina Gomez Juarez; Mexico	Kai Pare; Canada
65 kg	Eve Skrocki; United States	Yolayni Rosado Valerio; Dominican Republic	Maria Luciano Miranda; Brazil
65 kg	Eve Skrocki; United States	Yolayni Rosado Valerio; Dominican Republic	Sylvia Espinosa Muniz; Mexico
69 kg	Matilda Hruby; United States	Maria Paz Rangel; Mexico	Khushleen Jhalli; Canada
73 kg	Alexis Penley; United States	Kaillany Melo Ferreira Da Cruz; Brazil	Deborah Garcia Pacheco; Mexico
73 kg	Alexis Penley; United States	Kaillany Melo Ferreira Da Cruz; Brazil	Aisha Williams Bautista; Panama

== Medal table ==
* Host nation (Panama)

Rank	Nation	Gold	Silver	Bronze	Total
1	United States	23	4	3	30
2	Mexico	3	6	8	17
3	Puerto Rico	2	1	10	13
4	Canada	1	5	5	11
5	Venezuela	1	2	2	5
6	Brazil	0	5	5	10
7	Ecuador	0	3	3	6
8	Peru	0	1	4	5
9	Colombia	0	1	3	4
10	Dominican Republic	0	1	1	2
11	Honduras	0	1	0	1
12	Chile	0	0	2	2
12	El Salvador	0	0	2	2
12	Guatemala	0	0	2	2
15	Panama*	0	0	1	1
Totals (15 entries)		30	30	51	111

== Team ranking ==
Rank	Men's freestyle		Men's Greco-Roman		Women's freestyle	
Rank	Team	Points	Team	Points	Team	Points
1	United States	235	United States	230	United States	235
2	Canada	147	Mexico	141	Mexico	170
3	Puerto Rico	112	Puerto Rico	111	Canada	133
4	Mexico	100	Brazil	81	Ecuador	103
5	Peru	83	Ecuador	81	Puerto Rico	75
6	Brazil	78	Peru	76	Brazil	66
7	Venezuela	57	Venezuela	60	Panama	61
8	Colombia	53	Panama	54	Peru	51
9	El Salvador	44	Guatemala	52	Venezuela	48
10	Panama	43	Chile	35	Colombia	36
11	Ecuador	38	Dominican Republic	25	Honduras	30
12	Chile	25	Honduras	24	Dominican Republic	20
13	Dominican Republic	20	Nicaragua	20	Argentina	10
14	Guatemala	20	Colombia	12	Guatemala	10
15	Argentina	10	Jamaica	9	Chile	6
16	Nicaragua	8	El Salvador	0	Jamaica	4
17	Jamaica	6			Nicaragua	0
18	Paraguay	6				
19	Costa Rica	2				
