= 2025 U17 Pan American Wrestling Championships =

- Host city: (Brazil) Rio de Janeiro
- Dates: 19–21 June 2025

Champions
- Freestyle: United States
- Greco-Roman: United States
- Women: United States

The 2025 U17 Pan American Wrestling Championships was held from 19 to 21 June in Rio de Janeiro, Brazil.

== Medal summary ==
=== Men's freestyle ===
Event	Gold	Silver	Bronze
45 kg	Thales Silva; United States	Francesko Canayo Ipushima; Peru	Cristhian Cevallos Espana; Ecuador
48 kg	Ariah Mills; United States	Jose Quintero Alonso; Mexico	Fabian Sanchez Molina; Puerto Rico
48 kg	Ariah Mills; United States	Jose Quintero Alonso; Mexico	Andre Huarcaya Lopez; Peru
51 kg	Cruz Little; Puerto Rico	Jonrex Casa; Canada	Luigeth Antunez Rivas; Venezuela
51 kg	Cruz Little; Puerto Rico	Jonrex Casa; Canada	Kadir Quinones Tejada; Panama
55 kg	Thomas Wurster; United States	Jovanni Tovar; Colombia	Gabriel Licon Ramirez; Venezuela
55 kg	Thomas Wurster; United States	Jovanni Tovar; Colombia	Aaharen Piranavan; Canada
60 kg	Frederick Bachmann Jr; Puerto Rico	Nicholas Sorrow; United States	Adrian Canales Perez; El Salvador
60 kg	Frederick Bachmann Jr; Puerto Rico	Nicholas Sorrow; United States	Nathan Nash; Canada
65 kg	Arseni Kikiniou; United States	Yandro Soto Rivera; Puerto Rico	Cameron Haines; Panama
65 kg	Arseni Kikiniou; United States	Yandro Soto Rivera; Puerto Rico	Liam Gorton; Canada
71 kg	Jayden James; United States	Antonio Arguello Belcolore; El Salvador	Benjamin Casas Vaquel; Argentina
71 kg	Jayden James; United States	Antonio Arguello Belcolore; El Salvador	Anthony Molina Rubio; Peru
80 kg	Isai Fernandez; United States	Beau Chartrand; Canada	Alan Garcia Morales; Puerto Rico
80 kg	Isai Fernandez; United States	Beau Chartrand; Canada	Maycki Flores Ayala; Peru
92 kg	James Smith; United States	Harjot Shergill; Canada	Franco Latorre; Puerto Rico
110 kg	Alexander Taylor; United States	Udaypartap Billen; Canada	Carlos Cabrales Encarnacion; Mexico

=== Men's Greco-Roman ===
Event	Gold	Silver	Bronze
45 kg	Ronald Morales Garcia; Ecuador	Thales Silva; United States	Cristofer Quintero Alonso; Mexico
48 kg	Ariah Mills; United States	Andre Huarcaya Lopez; Peru	Pedro Santos Sousa; Brazil
48 kg	Ariah Mills; United States	Andre Huarcaya Lopez; Peru	Emiliano Garcia Yepez; Ecuador
51 kg	Carter Shin; United States	Luigeth Antunez Rivas; Venezuela	Jules Casalino Berrocal; Peru
51 kg	Carter Shin; United States	Luigeth Antunez Rivas; Venezuela	Maycon de Castro Oliveira; Brazil
55 kg	Thomas Wurster; United States	Lavozier Wadik Maruso; Brazil	Haniel Rodriguez Nolaya; Venezuela
55 kg	Thomas Wurster; United States	Lavozier Wadik Maruso; Brazil	Mateo Perez Raskovsky; Mexico
60 kg	Nicholas Sorrow; United States	Zeus Gonzalez Gonzalez; Mexico	Edwin Morales Pacheco; Puerto Rico
60 kg	Nicholas Sorrow; United States	Zeus Gonzalez Gonzalez; Mexico	Gabriel Licon Ramirez; Venezuela
65 kg	Arseni Kikiniou; United States	Raul Castillo Molina; Mexico	Jostyn Salvatierra Baque; Ecuador
71 kg	Jayden James; United States	Heder Saldana Bernardino; Mexico	Anthony Molina Rubio; Peru
71 kg	Jayden James; United States	Heder Saldana Bernardino; Mexico	Lhyam Gracia Estupinan; Ecuador
80 kg	John Saenz Corea; Guatemala	Maycki Flores Ayala; Peru	Isai Fernandez; United States
80 kg	John Saenz Corea; Guatemala	Maycki Flores Ayala; Peru	Miguel Xavier dos Santos; Brazil
92 kg	James Smith; United States	Jose Perez Santamaria; Colombia	Joao Amorim Franca Oliveira; Brazil
92 kg	James Smith; United States	Jose Perez Santamaria; Colombia	Cristhoper Perez Dominguez; Guatemala
110 kg	Raphael Rodrigues Duarte; Brazil	Alexander Taylor; United States	Angel Garcia Nunez; Mexico

=== Women ===
Event	Gold	Silver	Bronze
40 kg	Maisie Elliott; United States	Merlis Linares Varela; Venezuela	Corangelys Torres Kuilan; Puerto Rico
43 kg	Natalie Radecki; United States	Xiomara Meza Alava; Ecuador	Karen Rios Silva; Mexico
46 kg	Jaclyn Bouzakis; United States	Valeria Narvaez Gascon; Venezuela	Mayllin Escobar Marroquin; Guatemala
46 kg	Jaclyn Bouzakis; United States	Valeria Narvaez Gascon; Venezuela	Heklanys Rivera Quiles; Puerto Rico
49 kg	Morgan Turner; United States	Siria Gamboa Rodriguez; Guatemala	Kamryn Mason; Canada
49 kg	Morgan Turner; United States	Siria Gamboa Rodriguez; Guatemala	Asia Sanchez Maldonado; Venezuela
53 kg	Stevie Martin; United States	Camila Perez Tejada Prieto; Mexico	Clara Perry; Canada
53 kg	Stevie Martin; United States	Camila Perez Tejada Prieto; Mexico	Emma A Peake; Puerto Rico
57 kg	Emma Bacon; United States	Sofia Luna Ortega; Mexico	Yasmim Neper Oliveira Santos; Brazil
57 kg	Emma Bacon; United States	Sofia Luna Ortega; Mexico	Stacy Rodriguez Tello; Peru
61 kg	Taina Fernandez; United States	Yolayni Rosado Valerio; Dominican Republic	Sara Robles Alcantara; Mexico
61 kg	Taina Fernandez; United States	Yolayni Rosado Valerio; Dominican Republic	Susana Sánchez; Colombia
65 kg	Violette Lasure; United States	Luz Cuauro Alvarez; Venezuela	Shantallee Barrios; Colombia
65 kg	Violette Lasure; United States	Luz Cuauro Alvarez; Venezuela	Beatriz Calasans Camargo; Brazil
69 kg	Cassandra Gonzales; United States	Linda Martinez Armenta; Mexico	Mayara Neper Oliveira Santos; Brazil
73 kg	Ella Poalillo; United States	Perla Pena Pitre; Venezuela	Deborah Garcia Pacheco; Mexico

== Medal table ==
* Host nation (Brazil)

Rank	Nation	Gold	Silver	Bronze	Total
1	United States	25	3	1	29
2	Puerto Rico	2	1	7	10
3	Brazil*	1	1	7	9
4	Ecuador	1	1	4	6
5	Guatemala	1	1	2	4
6	Mexico	0	7	7	14
7	Venezuela	0	5	5	10
8	Canada	0	4	5	9
9	Peru	0	3	6	9
10	Colombia	0	2	2	4
11	El Salvador	0	1	1	2
12	Dominican Republic	0	1	0	1
13	Panama	0	0	2	2
14	Argentina	0	0	1	1
Totals (14 entries)		30	30	50	110

== Team ranking ==
Rank	Men's freestyle		Men's Greco-Roman		Women's freestyle	
Rank	Team	Points	Team	Points	Team	Points
1	United States	228	United States	230	United States	250
2	Puerto Rico	147	Brazil	146	Mexico	147
3	Canada	144	Mexico	143	Venezuela	119
4	Peru	80	Peru	114	Canada	98
5	Mexico	77	Ecuador	98	Brazil	90
6	Venezuela	68	Venezuela	65	Puerto Rico	59
7	Panama	54	Guatemala	58	Colombia	56
8	Brazil	52	Puerto Rico	43	Ecuador	52
9	El Salvador	51	Colombia	36	Peru	50
10	Colombia	49	Chile	36	Guatemala	45
11	Ecuador	49	Panama	25	Argentina	30
12	Guatemala	32	El Salvador	12	Dominican Republic	20
13	Argentina	31	Honduras	10	Panama	14
14	Chile	8			Chile	6
15	Honduras	4			Honduras	0
