= 2023 U17 Pan American Wrestling Championships =

- Host city: Mexico City
- Dates: 22–24 June 2023

Champions
- Freestyle: United States
- Greco-Roman: United States
- Women: United States

The 2023 U17 Pan American Wrestling Championships was held from 22 to 24 June in Mexico City, Mexico.

== Medal summary ==
=== Men's freestyle ===
Event	Gold	Silver	Bronze
45 kg	Henry Aslikyan; United States	Zakir Ibrahimkheil; Canada	Ronald Morales Garcia; Ecuador
45 kg	Henry Aslikyan; United States	Zakir Ibrahimkheil; Canada	Frederick Bachmann Jr. Puerto Rico
48 kg	Joseph Bachmann; Puerto Rico	Lincoln Sledzianowski; United States	Victor Lopez Davila; Mexico
51 kg	Czar Quintanilla; United States	Yandel Morale; Puerto Rico	Moises Peralta Gonzalez; Ecuador
51 kg	Czar Quintanilla; United States	Yandel Morale; Puerto Rico	Renzo Menor Arce; Peru
55 kg	Elijah Cortez; United States	Derick Martinez Mateo; Puerto Rico	German Pezos Vasquez; Mexico
60 kg	Yandro Soto Rivera; Puerto Rico	Samuel Herring; United States	Cruz Lewis; Canada
60 kg	Yandro Soto Rivera; Puerto Rico	Samuel Herring; United States	Pedro Toribio Torres; Peru
65 kg	Elvis Solis; Puerto Rico	Gabriel Bouyssou; United States	Jose Arenas Cuadras; Mexico
71 kg	Vincent Bouzakis; United States	Alan Vera Gomez; Mexico	Victor Soto Rivera; Puerto Rico
71 kg	Vincent Bouzakis; United States	Alan Vera Gomez; Mexico	Sixto Garcia Mina; Ecuador
80 kg	Adam Waters; United States	Luis Figuereo Suero; Dominican Republic	Bryan Campos Flores; Peru
92 kg	Michaeljeet Singh Grewal; Canada	Aiden Cooley; United States	Diego Guillen Ruiz; Mexico
110 kg	Nicholas Sahakian; United States	Jagroop Singh Dhinsa; Canada	Nicolas Santacruz Rabago; Mexico

=== Men's Greco-Roman ===
Event	Gold	Silver	Bronze
45 kg	Henry Aslikyan; United States	Frederick Bachmann Jr; Puerto Rico	Ronald Garcia; Ecuador
48 kg	Lincoln Sledzianowski; United States	Pedro De Souza Rodrigues; Brazil	Daniel Martinez Salinas; Mexico
51 kg	Moises Peralta Gonzalez; Ecuador	Jose Lopez Vazquez; Mexico	Czar Quintanilla; United States
55 kg	Rodrigo Falcon Aguirre; Mexico	Elijah Cortez; United States	Cristian Sanchez Guerra; Dominican Republic
55 kg	Rodrigo Falcon Aguirre; Mexico	Elijah Cortez; United States	Derick Martinez Mateo; Puerto Rico
60 kg	Clisman Carracedo Veliz; Ecuador	Ivan Olivera Montijo; Mexico	Augusto Vargas Valle; Chile
60 kg	Clisman Carracedo Veliz; Ecuador	Ivan Olivera Montijo; Mexico	Samuel Herring; United States
65 kg	Nelson Chantaca Gonzalez; Mexico	Joao Montesinos Macedo; Peru	Gabriel Bouyssou; United States
65 kg	Nelson Chantaca Gonzalez; Mexico	Joao Montesinos Macedo; Peru	Lucas Marciel Da Silva; Brazil
71 kg	Vincent Bouzakis; United States	Marcopolo Garcia Rodriguez; Mexico	Victor Soto Rivera; Puerto Rico
80 kg	Alejandro Castaño; Colombia	Adam Waters; United States	Mauro Resendiz Dominguez; Mexico
92 kg	Dorian Trejo Olguin; Mexico	Aiden Cooley; United States	Kevin Leal; Colombia
110 kg	Nicholas Sahakian; United States	Abraham Avalos Canul; Mexico	Gustavo Duarte Constantino; Brazil

=== Women ===
Event	Gold	Silver	Bronze
40 kg	Francesca Gusfa; United States	Ana Baquerizo Gavilanes; Ecuador	Manavi Asthana; Canada
43 kg	Katelyn Valdez; United States	Jennyfer Jimenez Ferrusca; Mexico	Vitoria Da Silva Vieira; Brazil
46 kg	Charlie Wylie; United States	Vicky Leon Gomez; Ecuador	Anna Gutierrez Martinez; Mexico
49 kg	Harlee Hiller; United States	Aneishka Santos Baez; Puerto Rico	Valeria Alvarez Agurto; Ecuador
53 kg	Isabella Gonzales; United States	Montserrat Hernandez Gomez; Mexico	Paola Vezquez Marengo; Puerto Rico
57 kg	Carley Ceshker; United States	Eliana White Vega; Puerto Rico	Avril De Souza Oliveira; Brazil
61 kg	Cadence Diduch; United States	Leiddy Acuna Penaranda; Ecuador	Carina Giangeruso; Puerto Rico
65 kg	Belicia Manuel; United States	Diana Carmona; Colombia	Debanhi Martinez Tello; Mexico
69 kg	Sarah Henckel; United States	Zashka Ruiz Carrizales; Mexico	Angie Medina; Colombia
73 kg	Edna Jimenez Villalba; Mexico	Mishell Rebisch; United States	Beatrice Turner Galaise; Canada

== Medal table ==
* Host nation (Mexico)

Rank	Nation	Gold	Silver	Bronze	Total
1	United States	19	8	3	30
2	Mexico*	4	8	9	21
3	Puerto Rico	3	5	6	14
4	Ecuador	2	3	5	10
5	Canada	1	2	3	6
6	Colombia	1	1	2	4
7	Brazil	0	1	4	5
8	Peru	0	1	3	4
9	Dominican Republic	0	1	1	2
10	Chile	0	0	1	1
Totals (10 entries)		30	30	37	97

== Team ranking ==
Rank	Men's freestyle		Men's Greco-Roman		Women's freestyle	
Rank	Team	Points	Team	Points	Team	Points
1	United States	230	United States	205	United States	245
2	Puerto Rico	145	Mexico	194	Mexico	136
3	Mexico	135	Peru	103	Canada	94
4	Peru	109	Colombia	94	Ecuador	83
5	Canada	108	Ecuador	85	Puerto Rico	80
6	Ecuador	55	Puerto Rico	75	Brazil	63
7	Brazil	54	Brazil	66	Colombia	57
8	Guatemala	40	Guatemala	40	Peru	30
9	Dominican Republic	36	Dominican Republic	26	Chile	8
10	Colombia	26	Chile	21		
11	El Salvador	12	El Salvador	12		
12	Costa Rica	8				
