= 2024 U17 Pan American Wrestling Championships =

- Host city: (Dominican Republic) Santo Domingo
- Dates: 27–29 June 2024

Champions
- Freestyle: United States
- Greco-Roman: United States
- Women: United States

The 2024 U17 Pan American Wrestling Championships was held from 27 to 29 June in Santo Domingo, Dominican Republic.

== Medal summary ==
=== Men's freestyle ===
| Event | Gold | Silver | Bronze |
|---|---|---|---|
| 45 kg | Isaiah Webber; United States | Ronald Morales Garcia; Ecuador | Jan Claude Franco Acho; Peru |
| 45 kg | Isaiah Webber; United States | Ronald Morales Garcia; Ecuador | Fabian Sanchez Molina; Puerto Rico |
| 48 kg | Andre Huarcaya Lopez; Peru | Carter Shin; United States | Nathaniel Lyttle; Puerto Rico |
| 48 kg | Andre Huarcaya Lopez; Peru | Carter Shin; United States | Christopher Archila Gutierrez; Guatemala |
| 51 kg | Frederick Bachmann Jr; Puerto Rico | Jhon Ramírez; Colombia | Arseni Kikiniou; United States |
| 51 kg | Frederick Bachmann Jr; Puerto Rico | Jhon Ramírez; Colombia | Aaharen Piranavan; Canada |
| 55 kg | Joseph Bachmann; Puerto Rico | Gabriel Licon Ramirez; Venezuela | Hugo Lopez y Lopez; Guatemala |
| 55 kg | Joseph Bachmann; Puerto Rico | Gabriel Licon Ramirez; Venezuela | Slater Hicks; United States |
| 60 kg | Manuel Saldate; United States | Ryan Dahcha; Canada | Joseph Chavez Ortiz; Venezuela |
| 60 kg | Manuel Saldate; United States | Ryan Dahcha; Canada | Jaden Perez; Puerto Rico |
| 65 kg | Wyatt Medlin; United States | Liam Gorton; Canada | Benjamin Aguilar Gutierrez; El Salvador |
| 65 kg | Wyatt Medlin; United States | Liam Gorton; Canada | Yandro Soto Rivera; Puerto Rico |
| 71 kg | Joseph Jeter Jr; United States | Sergio Espinoza Muniz; Mexico | Tyler Silva Neiva; Brazil |
| 71 kg | Joseph Jeter Jr; United States | Sergio Espinoza Muniz; Mexico | Kawayran Vazquez Jr; Puerto Rico |
| 80 kg | Emmitt Sherlock; United States | Luis Figuereo Suero; Dominican Republic | John Saenz Corea; Guatemala |
| 80 kg | Emmitt Sherlock; United States | Luis Figuereo Suero; Dominican Republic | Beau Chartrand; Canada |
| 92 kg | Michealjeet Grewal; Canada | Brandon Hernandez Ramirez; Mexico | Evan McGuire; United States |
| 92 kg | Michealjeet Grewal; Canada | Brandon Hernandez Ramirez; Mexico | Franco Latorre; Puerto Rico |
| 110 kg | Trayvn Boger; United States | Jagroop Dhinsa; Canada | Mizael Llontop Cruz; Peru |

=== Men's Greco-Roman ===
| Event | Gold | Silver | Bronze |
|---|---|---|---|
| 45 kg | Ronald Morales Garcia; Ecuador | Isaiah Webber; United States | Jan Claude Franco Acho; Peru |
| 48 kg | Carter Shin; United States | Yuri Landim Ribiero; Brazil | Anderson Franco Guzman; Venezuela |
| 51 kg | Moises Peralta Gonzalez; Ecuador | Arseni Kikiniou; United States | Erick Choc Choc; Guatemala |
| 55 kg | Slater Hicks; United States | Juan Cristaldo Galindo; Peru | Edwin Bonilla Moranzu; Dominican Republic |
| 55 kg | Slater Hicks; United States | Juan Cristaldo Galindo; Peru | Yurem Aguilar Arellano; Mexico |
| 60 kg | Manuel Saldate; United States | Joseph Chavez Ortiz; Venezuela | Abisai Camacho Valenciano; Mexico |
| 60 kg | Manuel Saldate; United States | Joseph Chavez Ortiz; Venezuela | Erick Vera Olave; Ecuador |
| 65 kg | Wyatt Medlin; United States | Joao Montesinos Macedo; Peru | Lucas Marciel Da Silva; Brazil |
| 71 kg | Joseph Jeter Jr; United States | Kawayran Vazquez Jr; Puerto Rico | Angel Catalan Martine; Guatemala |
| 71 kg | Joseph Jeter Jr; United States | Kawayran Vazquez Jr; Puerto Rico | Anthony Molina Rubio; Peru |
| 80 kg | Guilherme Landim Salles; Brazil | Kevin Leal; Colombia | Emmitt Sherlock; United States |
| 80 kg | Guilherme Landim Salles; Brazil | Kevin Leal; Colombia | Jean Zambrano Longas; Ecuador |
| 92 kg | Evan McGuire; United States | Yorby Villalobos Hernandez; Venezuela | Cristhoper Perez Dominguez; Guatemala |
| 110 kg | Trayvn Boger; United States | Raphael Rodrigues Duarte; Brazil | Mizael Llontop Cruz; Peru |

=== Women ===
| Event | Gold | Silver | Bronze |
|---|---|---|---|
| 40 kg | Francesca Gusfa; United States | Indra Trejo Jimenez; Mexico | Iraabir Sooch; Canada |
| 43 kg | Gabriela Palacios Hernandez; Mexico | Hailey Delgado; United States | Xiomara Meza Alava; Ecuador |
| 46 kg | Jaclyn Bouzakis; United States | Mayllin Escobar Marroquin; Guatemala | Miayalee Ortiz Martine; Puerto Rico |
| 46 kg | Jaclyn Bouzakis; United States | Mayllin Escobar Marroquin; Guatemala | Camila Pachas Huaroto; Peru |
| 49 kg | Julianna Ocampo; United States | Andreilyn Zamora Delgado; Venezuela | Aneishka Santos Baez; Puerto Rico |
| 49 kg | Julianna Ocampo; United States | Andreilyn Zamora Delgado; Venezuela | Isabela García; Colombia |
| 53 kg | Kaura Cole; Canada | Angelica Plascencia Aceves; Mexico | Charlie Wylie; United States |
| 53 kg | Kaura Cole; Canada | Angelica Plascencia Aceves; Mexico | Delialah Betances; Puerto Rico |
| 57 kg | Everest Leydecker; United States | Ana Vergara; Colombia | Agnia Krakovska; Canada |
| 57 kg | Everest Leydecker; United States | Ana Vergara; Colombia | Gabriela Avila Dia; Puerto Rico |
| 61 kg | Taina Fernandez; United States | Leiddy Acuna Penaranda; Ecuador | Yolayni Rosado Valerio; Dominican Republic |
| 65 kg | Bella Williams; United States | Luz Cuaro Alvarez; Venezuela | Mayara Neper Oliveira Santos; Brazil |
| 69 kg | Kaili Manuel; United States | Khushleen Jhalli; Canada | Maria Paz Rangel; Mexico |
| 73 kg | Piper Fowler; United States | Julia Da Silva Joaquim; Brazil | Nathaly Murillo Duran; Mexico |

== Medal table ==
* Host nation (Dominican Republic)

| Rank | Nation | Gold | Silver | Bronze | Total |
|---|---|---|---|---|---|
| 1 | United States | 21 | 4 | 5 | 30 |
| 2 | Canada | 2 | 4 | 4 | 10 |
| 3 | Ecuador | 2 | 2 | 3 | 7 |
| 4 | Puerto Rico | 2 | 1 | 10 | 13 |
| 5 | Mexico | 1 | 4 | 4 | 9 |
| 6 | Brazil | 1 | 3 | 3 | 7 |
| 7 | Peru | 1 | 2 | 6 | 9 |
| 8 | Venezuela | 0 | 5 | 2 | 7 |
| 9 | Colombia | 0 | 3 | 1 | 4 |
| 10 | Guatemala | 0 | 1 | 6 | 7 |
| 11 | Dominican Republic* | 0 | 1 | 2 | 3 |
| 12 | El Salvador | 0 | 0 | 1 | 1 |
| Totals (12 entries) | | 30 | 30 | 47 | 107 |

== Team ranking ==
| Rank | Men's freestyle | | Men's Greco-Roman | | Women's freestyle | |
| Rank | Team | Points | Team | Points | Team | Points |
|---|---|---|---|---|---|---|
| 1 | United States | 215 | United States | 230 | United States | 235 |
| 2 | Canada | 141 | Peru | 123 | Mexico | 137 |
| 3 | Puerto Rico | 140 | Ecuador | 118 | Canada | 125 |
| 4 | Peru | 95 | Dominican Republic | 96 | Puerto Rico | 81 |
| 5 | Dominican Republic | 90 | Brazil | 86 | Brazil | 77 |
| 6 | Mexico | 72 | Venezuela | 69 | Peru | 68 |
| 7 | Guatemala | 67 | Guatemala | 65 | Dominican Republic | 59 |
| 8 | Brazil | 61 | Puerto Rico | 58 | Venezuela | 54 |
| 9 | Venezuela | 59 | Mexico | 55 | Colombia | 45 |
| 10 | Ecuador | 54 | Chile | 34 | Ecuador | 39 |
| 11 | Colombia | 36 | Colombia | 20 | Guatemala | 26 |
| 12 | El Salvador | 26 | Barbados El Salvador | 10 | | |
| 13 | Barbados | 25 | — | | | |
| 14 | Argentina | 10 | Honduras | 6 | | |
| 15 | Chile | 6 | Argentina | 4 | | |
| 16 | Honduras | 4 | | | | |
| 17 | Jamaica | 2 | | | | |
| 18 | Costa Rica | 0 | | | | |
