= 2025 U15 Pan American Wrestling Championships =

- Host city: Guatemala City
- Dates: 22–24 May 2025

Champions
- Freestyle: United States
- Greco-Roman: United States
- Women: United States

The 2025 U15 Pan American Wrestling Championships was the 6th edition of U15 Pan American Wrestling Championships of combined events, and it was held from 22 to 24 May in Guatemala City, Guatemala.

== Medal summary ==
=== Men's freestyle ===
Event	Gold	Silver	Bronze
38 kg	Johnathan Thompson; United States	Steven Mytych; Puerto Rico	Isaias Leciano Mut; Mexico
41 kg	Nelson Villafane III; Puerto Rico	Rylen Wax; United States	Brayden DeJesus; Puerto Rico
44 kg	Brody Compau; United States	Duglas Urrutia Ramos; Guatemala	Alexander Cevallos Espana; Ecuador
44 kg	Brody Compau; United States	Duglas Urrutia Ramos; Guatemala	Chase Millan; Puerto Rico
48 kg	Spenser McCammon; United States	Jorge Borges Da Silva; Brazil	Osiris Sanchez Pacheco; Mexico
48 kg	Spenser McCammon; United States	Jorge Borges Da Silva; Brazil	Diego Vargas Lopez; Ecuador
52 kg	Cruz Little; Puerto Rico	Lewis Davis; United States	Samyr Valverde Mendez; Peru
52 kg	Cruz Little; Puerto Rico	Lewis Davis; United States	Auzueres Severino de Santana Neto; Brazil
57 kg	Mason Milsaps; United States	Mauricio Alvarado Espinoza; Mexico	Andrew Gomez; Puerto Rico
57 kg	Mason Milsaps; United States	Mauricio Alvarado Espinoza; Mexico	Guillermo Chavarria Rosales; Guatemala
62 kg	Riley Watts; United States	Emanuel Pineda Cruz; Guatemala	Tadeo Barron Medina; Mexico
62 kg	Riley Watts; United States	Emanuel Pineda Cruz; Guatemala	Victor Rojas Quispe; Peru
68 kg	Tommy Rowlands; United States	David Maldonado Melendez; Puerto Rico	Adrian Barbosa; Mexico
68 kg	Tommy Rowlands; United States	David Maldonado Melendez; Puerto Rico	Adrian Riques Morales; Peru
75 kg	Jenier Soto Pastrana; Puerto Rico	Samuel Harrington; United States	Arthur Da Cunha Estevao; Brazil
85 kg	Daniel Jackson; United States	Layden Acevedo Cordero; Puerto Rico	Ricardo Leyva Saguchi; Mexico

=== Men's Greco-Roman ===
Event	Gold	Silver	Bronze
38 kg	Johnathan Thompson; United States	Steven Mytych; Puerto Rico	Felipe Arangure Montoya; Mexico
41 kg	Rylen Wax; United States	Nelson Villafane III; Puerto Rico	Maddox Millan; Puerto Rico
41 kg	Rylen Wax; United States	Nelson Villafane III; Puerto Rico	Brayden De Jesus; Puerto Rico
44 kg	Brody Compau; United States	Fernando Jimeno Mendizabal; Peru	Francisco Alvarado Santos; Mexico
44 kg	Brody Compau; United States	Fernando Jimeno Mendizabal; Peru	Duglas Urrutia Ramos; Guatemala
48 kg	Spenser McCammon; United States	Josue Saenz Corea; Guatemala	Hector Prado Moreno; Mexico
48 kg	Spenser McCammon; United States	Josue Saenz Corea; Guatemala	Hector Aguilar Rodriguez; Mexico
52 kg	Lewis Davis; United States	Esau Albizures Bautista; Guatemala	William Mundo Garcia; Mexico
52 kg	Lewis Davis; United States	Esau Albizures Bautista; Guatemala	Afif Safadi Pincay; Ecuador
57 kg	Uriel Plaza Sanche; Mexico	Ryan Da Silva Brandao; Brazil	Guillermo Chavarria Rosales; Guatemala
57 kg	Uriel Plaza Sanche; Mexico	Ryan Da Silva Brandao; Brazil	Mason Milsaps; United States
62 kg	Abdiel Acha Mendoza; Peru	Riley Watts; United States	Erick Da Costa Salustino; Brazil
62 kg	Abdiel Acha Mendoza; Peru	Riley Watts; United States	Miguel Valenzuela Coronel; Mexico
68 kg	Thomas Rowlands; United States	Adrian Barbosa; Mexico	David Maldonado Melendez; Puerto Rico
68 kg	Thomas Rowlands; United States	Adrian Barbosa; Mexico	Diego Ramos Lopez; Mexico
75 kg	Arthur Da Cunha Estevao; Brazil	Jenier Soto Pastran; Puerto Rico	Samuel Harrington; United States
85 kg	Daniel Jackson; United States	Layden Acevedo Cordero; Puerto Rico	Guilherme Cavalcanti Simeoni; Brazil

=== Women ===
Event	Gold	Silver	Bronze
33 kg	Julianna LaSavage; United States	Maria Guanuna Guallichico; Ecuador	Not awarded
36 kg	Jaelyn Anderson; United States	Shirley Meza Alava; Ecuador	Victoria Rivera Diaz; Puerto Rico
39 kg	Brooklyn Henry; United States	Rubi Aguilar Montejo; Mexico	Andrea Flores Flores; Honduras
42 kg	Olivia Hernandez; United States	Katia Ramos Espinoza; Mexico	Natalie Lippstreu; Puerto Rico
46 kg	Bella Manno; United States	Lilia Valenzuela Perez; Mexico	Alejandra Salinas Betancourt; Chile
46 kg	Bella Manno; United States	Lilia Valenzuela Perez; Mexico	Ashly Choc Choc; Guatemala
50 kg	Lyric Hetzer; United States	Bella Sandoval Franco; Peru	Solange Palacios Cevallos; Ecuador
50 kg	Lyric Hetzer; United States	Bella Sandoval Franco; Peru	Rafaela De Azevedo Bispo; Brazil
54 kg	Olivia Kearns; United States	Mariajose Diaz Chuquizuta; Peru	Madelyn Little; Puerto Rico
54 kg	Olivia Kearns; United States	Mariajose Diaz Chuquizuta; Peru	Sofia De Jesus Nussa; Puerto Rico
58 kg	Jauzlyean Gray; United States	Melanny Velasco Rubio; Mexico	Gilda Zhuzhingo Loja; Ecuador
58 kg	Jauzlyean Gray; United States	Melanny Velasco Rubio; Mexico	Maria Anaya Raya; Mexico
62 kg	Audrey Robinson; United States	Samantha Victores Valadez; Mexico	Fernanda Riffo Catalan; Chile
66 kg	Camilla Hathaway; United States	Kimberly Munoz; Puerto Rico	Hannia Casso Lopez; Mexico

== Medal table ==
* Host nation (Guatemala)

Rank	Nation	Gold	Silver	Bronze	Total
1	United States	24	4	2	30
2	Puerto Rico	3	8	10	21
3	Mexico	1	7	14	22
4	Peru	1	3	3	7
5	Brazil	1	2	5	8
6	Guatemala*	0	4	4	8
7	Ecuador	0	2	5	7
8	Chile	0	0	2	2
9	Honduras	0	0	1	1
Totals (9 entries)		30	30	46	106

== Team ranking ==
Rank	Men's freestyle		Men's Greco-Roman		Women's freestyle	
Rank	Team	Points	Team	Points	Team	Points
1	United States	235	United States	225	United States	250
2	Puerto Rico	185	Mexico	154	Mexico	135
3	Mexico	109	Puerto Rico	127	Ecuador	107
4	Guatemala	83	Brazil	115	Puerto Rico	83
5	Brazil	82	Guatemala	88	Guatemala	67
6	Peru	63	Peru	73	Peru	50
7	Ecuador	61	Ecuador	58	Brazil	37
8	Panama	44	Panama	16	Chile	36
9	Chile	10	Nicaragua	2	Honduras	27
10	Costa Rica	6			Nicaragua	27
11	Nicaragua	2			Panama	26
12					El Salvador	8
