= 2022 U17 Pan American Wrestling Championships =

- Host city: (Argentina) Buenos Aires
- Dates: 24–26 June 2022

Champions
- Freestyle: United States
- Greco-Roman: United States
- Women: United States

The 2022 U17 Pan American Wrestling Championships was held from 24 to 26 June in Buenos Aires, Argentina.

== Medal summary ==
=== Men's freestyle ===
| Event | Gold | Silver | Bronze |
|---|---|---|---|
| 45 kg | Domenic Munaretto; United States | Oliver Contreras Chavez; Mexico | Wesley Heather; Canada |
| 48 kg | Christian Castillo; United States | Alvin Tovar Romero; Venezuela | Pedro De Souza Rodrigues; Brazil |
| 51 kg | Edwin Sierra; United States | Fabricio Rosero Quintero; Ecuador | Arnold Rivera Negron; Puerto Rico |
| 55 kg | Kael Lauridsen; United States | Roger Dos Santos Ramalhete; Brazil | Derick Martinez Mateo; Puerto Rico |
| 55 kg | Kael Lauridsen; United States | Roger Dos Santos Ramalhete; Brazil | Abel Sanchez Juarez; Peru |
| 60 kg | Zan Fugitt; United States | Jesue Vallareal Martinez; Mexico | Clisman Carracedo Veliz; Ecuador |
| 60 kg | Zan Fugitt; United States | Jesue Vallareal Martinez; Mexico | Jacob Brunner; Puerto Rico |
| 65 kg | Joel Adams; United States | Nathan Rainville; Canada | Santiago Pinargote Sornoza; Ecuador |
| 65 kg | Joel Adams; United States | Nathan Rainville; Canada | Diego Peraza Aguilar; Mexico |
| 71 kg | Dario Cubas Castillo; Peru | Kenneth Evans; United States | Darfel Parada Camacaro; Venezuela |
| 71 kg | Dario Cubas Castillo; Peru | Kenneth Evans; United States | Tejvir Singh Dhinsa; Canada |
| 80 kg | Cole Han Lindemyer; United States | Brian Ruiz Marin; Venezuela | Crishian Delgadillo; Argentina |
| 92 kg | Sawyer Bartelt; United States | Diego Guillen Ruiz; Mexico | Santiago Abinet; Argentina |
| 110 kg | Koy Hopke; United States | Kyle Santana Oliveira; Brazil | Luke Coffin; Canada |

=== Men's Greco-Roman ===
| Event | Gold | Silver | Bronze |
|---|---|---|---|
| 45 kg | Domenic Munaretto; United States | Pedro De Souza Rodrigues; Brazil | Oliver Contreras Chavez; Mexico |
| 48 kg | Christian Castillo; United States | Moises Peralta Gonzalez; Ecuador | Santiago Pachado; Argentina |
| 51 kg | Edwin Sierra; United States | Dan Ferreira Borges; Brazil | Facundo Saquiz; Argentina |
| 55 kg | Abel Sanchez Juarez; Peru | Kael Lauridsen; United States | Derick Martinez Mateo; Puerto Rico |
| 60 kg | Zan Fugitt; United States | Aymar Janampa Cueva; Peru | Diego Terriquez Ibarra; Mexico |
| 60 kg | Zan Fugitt; United States | Aymar Janampa Cueva; Peru | Rafael Garcia Morales; Puerto Rico |
| 65 kg | Joel Adams; United States | Santiago Pinargote Sornoza; Ecuador | Gabriel Rivero; Argentina |
| 71 kg | Darfel Parada Camacaro; Venezuela | Kenneth Evans; United States | Darío Cubas Castillo; Peru |
| 71 kg | Darfel Parada Camacaro; Venezuela | Kenneth Evans; United States | Isaac Tenorio Mosquera; Ecuador |
| 80 kg | Brian Ruiz Marin; Venezuela | Cole Han Lindemyer; United States | Adrian J Maynard; Barbados |
| 92 kg | Sawyer Bartelt; United States | Kyle Santana Oliveira; Brazil | David Ocaranza Ramirez; Mexico |
| 110 kg | Koy Hopke; United States | Ibrack Angulo Castillo; Ecuador | Leonardo Ibanez; Argentina |

=== Women ===
| Event | Gold | Silver | Bronze |
|---|---|---|---|
| 40 kg | Annalise Maralit; United States | Anayei Diaz Martinez; Mexico | Ana Moura Dos Santos; Brazil |
| 43 kg | Katelyn Valdez; United States | Vicky Leon Gomez; Ecuador | Marta Herrera Marroquin; Guatemala |
| 46 kg | Isabella Bocanegra; United States | Giovanna Cincinato Pimenta; Brazil | Yancy Lopez Davila; Guatemala |
| 49 kg | Ava Ward; United States | Kaura Coles; Canada | Danna Martinez Ordonez; Mexico |
| 49 kg | Ava Ward; United States | Kaura Coles; Canada | Alexa Alvarez Valenzuela; Venezuela |
| 53 kg | Persaeus Gomez; United States | Sofia Ocegueda Gonzalez; Mexico | Vivian Quezada Paucar; Ecuador |
| 53 kg | Persaeus Gomez; United States | Sofia Ocegueda Gonzalez; Mexico | Emilly Dos Santo Ferreira; Brazil |
| 57 kg | Leonela Gruezo Ortiz; Ecuador | Skylar Little Soldier; United States | Maricielo Molina Rivasplata; Peru |
| 57 kg | Leonela Gruezo Ortiz; Ecuador | Skylar Little Soldier; United States | Ella Finding; Canada |
| 61 kg | Neevis Rodriguez Cantu; Mexico | Marissa Rumsey; United States | Stefany Dos Santos Ferreira; Brazil |
| 65 kg | Gleymaris Beria Diaz; Venezuela | Sydney Perry; United States | Athziry Garay Chapa; Mexico |
| 69 kg | Mishell Rebisch; United States | Maria De Sousa Da Silva; Brazil | Not awarded |
| 73 kg | Rupinder Johal; Canada | Edna Jimenez Villalba; Mexico | Kaiulani Garcia; United States |

== Medal table ==
* Host nation (Argentina)

| Rank | Nation | Gold | Silver | Bronze | Total |
|---|---|---|---|---|---|
| 1 | United States | 22 | 7 | 1 | 30 |
| 2 | Venezuela | 3 | 2 | 2 | 7 |
| 3 | Peru | 2 | 1 | 3 | 6 |
| 4 | Mexico | 1 | 7 | 5 | 13 |
| 5 | Ecuador | 1 | 5 | 4 | 10 |
| 6 | Canada | 1 | 2 | 4 | 7 |
| 7 | Brazil | 0 | 6 | 5 | 11 |
| 8 | Argentina* | 0 | 0 | 6 | 6 |
| 9 | Puerto Rico | 0 | 0 | 5 | 5 |
| 10 | Guatemala | 0 | 0 | 2 | 2 |
| 11 | Barbados | 0 | 0 | 1 | 1 |
| Totals (11 entries) | | 30 | 30 | 38 | 98 |

== Team ranking ==
| Rank | Men's freestyle | | Men's Greco-Roman | | Women's freestyle | |
| Rank | Team | Points | Team | Points | Team | Points |
|---|---|---|---|---|---|---|
| 1 | United States | 245 | United States | 235 | United States | 225 |
| 2 | Canada | 117 | Argentina | 107 | Brazil | 124 |
| 3 | Mexico | 106 | Brazil | 104 | Mexico | 115 |
| 4 | Argentina | 90 | Ecuador | 85 | Canada | 90 |
| 5 | Brazil | 73 | Mexico | 71 | Ecuador | 70 |
| 6 | Venezuela | 71 | Peru | 60 | Argentina | 65 |
| 7 | Ecuador | 70 | Venezuela | 50 | Guatemala | 64 |
| 8 | Puerto Rico | 67 | Puerto Rico | 40 | Venezuela | 52 |
| 9 | Peru | 60 | Guatemala | 20 | Puerto Rico | 49 |
| 10 | Chile | 16 | Chile | 18 | Peru | 25 |
| 11 | Guatemala | 13 | Barbados | 15 | Chile | 6 |
| 12 | Barbados | 9 | Bolivia | 4 | | |
| 13 | Bolivia | 2 | | | | |
