= 2022 U15 Pan American Wrestling Championships =

- Host city: (Colombia) Apartadó
- Dates: 4–6 November 2022

Champions
- Freestyle: United States
- Greco-Roman: United States
- Women: United States

The 2022 U15 Pan American Wrestling Championships was the 3rd edition of U15 Pan American Wrestling Championships of combined events, and it was held from 4 to 6 November in Apartadó, Colombia.

== Medal summary ==
=== Men's freestyle ===
| Event | Gold | Silver | Bronze |
|---|---|---|---|
| 38 kg | Liam Collins; United States | Wilder Guerrero; Colombia | Samuel Gutiérrez; Colombia |
| 41 kg | Jensen Boyd; United States | Jorge Rios Martin; Mexico | Pean Morales Garcia; Ecuador |
| 41 kg | Jensen Boyd; United States | Jorge Rios Martin; Mexico | Jeferson Ribeiro Pinto; Brazil |
| 44 kg | Henry Aslikyan; United States | Andre Huarcaya Lopez; Peru | Luis Ramírez; Colombia |
| 44 kg | Henry Aslikyan; United States | Andre Huarcaya Lopez; Peru | Víctor Lopez Davila; Mexico |
| 48 kg | Lincoln Sledzianowsk; United States | Gabriel Licon Ramirez; Venezuela | Maik de Souza Almeida; Brazil |
| 48 kg | Lincoln Sledzianowsk; United States | Gabriel Licon Ramirez; Venezuela | Josting Ramírez; Colombia |
| 52 kg | Jeremy Santiago Jimenez; Puerto Rico | Pablo Rivero Nunez; Venezuela | Josiah Boyden; United States |
| 52 kg | Jeremy Santiago Jimenez; Puerto Rico | Pablo Rivero Nunez; Venezuela | Zeus Gonzalez Gonzalez; Mexico |
| 57 kg | Thomas Verrette IV; United States | David Martinz Gambino; Mexico | Joab Carrillo Rodriguez; Puerto Rico |
| 57 kg | Thomas Verrette IV; United States | David Martinz Gambino; Mexico | Vitor de Lima Braga; Brazil |
| 62 kg | YandroSoto Rivera; Puerto Rico | Joao Montesinos Macedo; Peru | Blue Stiffler; United States |
| 62 kg | YandroSoto Rivera; Puerto Rico | Joao Montesinos Macedo; Peru | Daniel Dueñas; Colombia |
| 68 kg | Mikel Uyemura; United States | Diego Gomez Ramirez; Mexico | Roammy Sanchez Navarro; Venezuela |
| 68 kg | Mikel Uyemura; United States | Diego Gomez Ramirez; Mexico | Yesid Urbano; Colombia |
| 75 kg | Terrell Leonard-McFarland; United States | Juan Lopez Ulloa; Mexico | Alejandro Castaño; Colombia |
| 75 kg | Terrell Leonard-McFarland; United States | Juan Lopez Ulloa; Mexico | Mythis Batista de Oliveira; Brazil |
| 85 kg | Dreshaun Ross; United States | Kevin Leal; Colombia | Ángel Flores Gonzalez; Mexico |
| 85 kg | Dreshaun Ross; United States | Kevin Leal; Colombia | Kenyiro Gonzales Huaman; Peru |

=== Men's Greco-Roman ===
| Event | Gold | Silver | Bronze |
|---|---|---|---|
| 38 kg | Liam Collins; United States | Andres Gallego; Colombia | Kevin Gómez; Colombia |
| 41 kg | Jensen Boyd; United States | Jhon Ramírez; Colombia | Felipe Lopera; Colombia |
| 41 kg | Jensen Boyd; United States | Jhon Ramírez; Colombia | Jorge Rios Martin; Mexico |
| 44 kg | Henry Aslikyan; United States | Andre Huarcaya Lopez; Peru | Haniel Rodriguez Nolaya; Venezuela |
| 44 kg | Henry Aslikyan; United States | Andre Huarcaya Lopez; Peru | Marvin Ramos Menoscal; Ecuador |
| 48 kg | Lincoln Sledzianowski; United States | Josting Ramírez; Colombia | Gabriel Licon Ramirez; Venezuela |
| 48 kg | Lincoln Sledzianowski; United States | Josting Ramírez; Colombia | Nelson Moreno Diaz; Venezuela |
| 52 kg | Josiah Boyden; United States | Luis Medellin Hernandez; Mexico | Percyvall Jibaja Zazzali; Peru |
| 52 kg | Josiah Boyden; United States | Luis Medellin Hernandez; Mexico | Zeus Gonzalez Gonzalez; Mexico |
| 57 kg | Thomas Verrette IV; United States | David Martinez Gambino; Mexico | Cristihan Ojeda Delgado; Venezuela |
| 57 kg | Thomas Verrette IV; United States | David Martinez Gambino; Mexico | Augusto Vagas Valle; Chile |
| 62 kg | Yandro Soto Rivera; Puerto Rico | Yorman Caballero; Colombia | Eike Souza da Silva; Brazil |
| 62 kg | Yandro Soto Rivera; Puerto Rico | Yorman Caballero; Colombia | Blue Stiffler; United States |
| 68 kg | Mikel Uyemura; United States | Heder Saldana Bernardino; Mexico | Kevyn Rodríguez; Colombia |
| 68 kg | Mikel Uyemura; United States | Heder Saldana Bernardino; Mexico | Allen Duarte Rodroguez; Venezuela |
| 75 kg | Terrell Leonard-McFarland; United States | Juan Lopez Ulloa; Mexico | Alejandro Castaño; Colombia |
| 75 kg | Terrell Leonard-McFarland; United States | Juan Lopez Ulloa; Mexico | Ángel Garcia Nunez; Mexico |
| 85 kg | Dreshaun Ross; United States | Kevin Leal; Colombia | John Saenz Corea; Guatemala |
| 85 kg | Dreshaun Ross; United States | Kevin Leal; Colombia | Thierry Miranda Martillo; Ecuador |

=== Women ===
| Event | Gold | Silver | Bronze |
|---|---|---|---|
| 36 kg | Francesca Gusfa; United States | Brynn Engel; United States | Sareth Manjarres Cerezo; Ecuador |
| 39 kg | Jaclyn Bouzakis; United States | María Garfias Sanchez; Mexico | Xochitl Hernandez Velasco; Mexico |
| 39 kg | Jaclyn Bouzakis; United States | María Garfias Sanchez; Mexico | Angelica Rivera; Colombia |
| 42 kg | Morgan Turner; United States | Isabela García; Colombia | Danierik Sira Diaz; Venezuela |
| 42 kg | Morgan Turner; United States | Isabela García; Colombia | Gabriela Palacios Hernandez; Mexico |
| 46 kg | Ysabelle Ocampo; United States | Ivana Lopez Rodriguez; Mexico | Muchell Castillo Colina; Venezuela |
| 46 kg | Ysabelle Ocampo; United States | Ivana Lopez Rodriguez; Mexico | Yuli Suarez; Colombia |
| 50 kg | Valeria Alvarez Agurto; Ecuador | Matilda Villareal; Mexico | Jayden Keller; United States |
| 50 kg | Valeria Alvarez Agurto; Ecuador | Matilda Villareal; Mexico | Aneishka Santos Baez; Puerto Rico |
| 54 kg | Isabella Gonzales; United States | Karime Ortiz Contreras; Mexico | Angelica Plascencia Aceves; Mexico |
| 54 kg | Isabella Gonzales; United States | Karime Ortiz Contreras; Mexico | Gabriela Avila Diaz; Puerto Rico |
| 58 kg | Taina Fernandez; United States | Isis Fachin Quispe; Peru | Mayara Neper Oliveira Santos; Brazil |
| 58 kg | Taina Fernandez; United States | Isis Fachin Quispe; Peru | Valentina Culma; Colombia |
| 62 kg | Isis France; United States | Leiddy Acuna Penaranda; Ecuador | Linda Martinez Armenta; Mexico |
| 66 kg | Skylar Slade; United States | María Paz Rangel; Mexico | Melanie Martinez Tello; Mexico |
| 66 kg | Skylar Slade; United States | María Paz Rangel; Mexico | Fabiana Cruz Zapata; Peru |

== Medal table ==
* Host nation (Colombia)

| Rank | Nation | Gold | Silver | Bronze | Total |
|---|---|---|---|---|---|
| 1 | United States | 25 | 1 | 4 | 30 |
| 2 | Puerto Rico | 3 | 0 | 3 | 6 |
| 3 | Ecuador | 1 | 1 | 4 | 6 |
| 4 | Mexico | 0 | 13 | 11 | 24 |
| 5 | Colombia* | 0 | 8 | 13 | 21 |
| 6 | Peru | 0 | 4 | 3 | 7 |
| 7 | Venezuela | 0 | 2 | 8 | 10 |
| 8 | Brazil | 0 | 0 | 6 | 6 |
| 9 | Chile | 0 | 0 | 1 | 1 |
| 9 | Guatemala | 0 | 0 | 1 | 1 |
| Totals (10 entries) | | 29 | 29 | 54 | 112 |

== Team ranking ==
| Rank | Men's freestyle | | Men's Greco-Roman | | Women's freestyle | |
| Rank | Team | Points | Team | Points | Team | Points |
|---|---|---|---|---|---|---|
| 1 | United States | 230 | United States | 240 | United States | 215 |
| 2 | Mexico | 143 | Colombia | 156 | Mexico | 149 |
| 3 | Colombia | 129 | Mexico | 135 | Colombia | 111 |
| 4 | Venezuela | 96 | Venezuela | 102 | Venezuela | 88 |
| 5 | Peru | 85 | Peru | 59 | Ecuador | 80 |
| 6 | Brazil | 78 | Brazil | 55 | Guatemala | 46 |
| 7 | Puerto Rico | 73 | Puerto Rico | 45 | Peru | 39 |
| 8 | Guatemala | 44 | Guatemala | 41 | Brazil | 35 |
| 9 | Ecuador | 41 | Ecuador | 40 | Puerto Rico | 30 |
| 10 | Barbados | 14 | Chile | 15 | Barbados | 9 |
| 11 | El Salvador | 2 | Barbados | 6 | | |
