= 2026 U15 Pan American Wrestling Championships =

- Host city: Mexico City
- Dates: 23–25 July 2026

Champions
- Freestyle: United States
- Greco-Roman: United States
- Women: United States

The 2026 U15 Pan American Wrestling Championships was the 7th edition of U15 Pan American Wrestling Championships of combined events, and it was held from 23 to 25 July in Mexico City, Mexico.

== Medal summary ==
=== Men's freestyle ===
Event	Gold	Silver	Bronze
38 kg	Matthew Campos; United States	Leonardo Lopez Cristino; Mexico	Cruz Leija Alor; Mexico
38 kg	Matthew Campos; United States	Leonardo Lopez Cristino; Mexico	Jonathan Veliz Cojom; Guatemala
41 kg	Jace Rooney; United States	Alexander Salazar Gregorio; Guatemala	David Leciano Mut; Mexico
44 kg	Steven Mytych; Puerto Rico	Cade Ruckle; United States	Dorian Mendoza Martinez; Mexico
48 kg	Maurice Worthy; United States	Brayden De Jesus; Puerto Rico	Andrey Navarro Lerma; Mexico
48 kg	Maurice Worthy; United States	Brayden De Jesus; Puerto Rico	Emiliano Gonzalez Tarevino; Mexico
52 kg	Fernando Jimeno Mendizabal; Peru	Walker Martin; United States	Johandiell Gonzalez Galicia; Puerto Rico
52 kg	Fernando Jimeno Mendizabal; Peru	Walker Martin; United States	Jorge Bordes Da Silva; Brazil
57 kg	Jarron Beltran; United States	Aaron Szumowski; Puerto Rico	Emilio Ramirez Beltran; Mexico
57 kg	Jarron Beltran; United States	Aaron Szumowski; Puerto Rico	Chase Millan; Puerto Rico
62 kg	Tristyn Ulloa; United States	Wilfredo Rodriguez Gonzalez; Venezuela	Auzueres Severino De Santana Neto; Brazil
62 kg	Tristyn Ulloa; United States	Wilfredo Rodriguez Gonzalez; Venezuela	Jonas Lopez Rodarte; Mexico
68 kg	Xander Fronhofer; United States	Stheven Padron De La Rosa; Venezuela	Saul Alvarez Jacobo; Mexico
68 kg	Xander Fronhofer; United States	Stheven Padron De La Rosa; Venezuela	Vicente Encalada Armijos; Ecuador
75 kg	Julian Smith; United States	Lucas Souza Santos; Brazil	Samuel Morales Patino; Mexico
85 kg	Spencer Davern; United States	Guilherme Porto Leo Fontes; Brazil	Job Campos Arizpe; Mexico

=== Men's Greco-Roman ===
Event	Gold	Silver	Bronze
38 kg	Matthew Campos; United States	Dilan Ovalle Ortiz; Guatemala	Maximiliano Mayoral Rodriguez; Mexico
41 kg	Jace Rooney; United States	Felipe Arangure Montoya; Mexico	Iker Testa Ruiz; Mexico
44 kg	Steven Mytych; Puerto Rico	Sergio Figueroa Duarte; Mexico	Cade Ruckle; United States
48 kg	Maurice Worthy; United States	Francisco Alvarado Santos; Mexico	Brayden De Jesus; Puerto Rico
48 kg	Maurice Worthy; United States	Francisco Alvarado Santos; Mexico	Jose Carter Castillo; Chile
52 kg	Walker Martin; United States	Hector Prado Moreno; Mexico	Luis Navarro Barrera; Mexico
52 kg	Walker Martin; United States	Hector Prado Moreno; Mexico	Fernando Jimeno Mendizabal; Peru
57 kg	Jarron Beltran; United States	Chase Millan; Puerto Rico	Damian Granados Oliva; Mexico
57 kg	Jarron Beltran; United States	Chase Millan; Puerto Rico	Francisco Guerra Morales; Mexico
62 kg	Wilfredo Rodriguez Gonzalez; Venezuela	Mateo Mirafuentes Resendez; Mexico	Jose Ramirez Salgado; Mexico
62 kg	Wilfredo Rodriguez Gonzalez; Venezuela	Mateo Mirafuentes Resendez; Mexico	Tristyn Ulloa; United States
68 kg	Stheven Padron De La Rosa; Venezuela	Vicente Encalada Armijos; Ecuador	Leandro Lacerda Melo; Brazil
68 kg	Stheven Padron De La Rosa; Venezuela	Vicente Encalada Armijos; Ecuador	Jeremy Lopez Cetzal; Mexico
75 kg	Julian Smith; United States	Daniel Gutierrez Argueta; Mexico	Jesus Nieves Cristobal; Mexico
85 kg	Spencer Davern; United States	Guilherme Porto Leo Fontes; Brazil	Cristian Arredondo Moreno; Mexico

=== Women ===
Event	Gold	Silver	Bronze
33 kg	Mila Sebolt; United States	Allison Pena Licon; Mexico	Luisa Gutiérrez; Colombia
36 kg	Freyda Nelson; United States	Violeta Arbeláez; Colombia	Victora Soto; Puerto Rico
39 kg	Julianna LaSavage; United States	Shirley Meza Alava; Ecuador	Victoria Rivera Diaz; Puerto Rico
42 kg	Jaelyn Anderson; United States	Jenny Galarza Ruiz; Ecuador	Vioreny Revilla Miranda; Mexico
46 kg	Olivia Hernandez; United States	Katia Ramos Espinosa; Mexico	Amanda Acosta Armijo; Chile
46 kg	Olivia Hernandez; United States	Katia Ramos Espinosa; Mexico	Ambar Escobedo Rivera; Mexico
50 kg	Bella Manno; United States	Dayhana Bernal Rodriguez; Mexico	Ava Tovar; Colombia
50 kg	Bella Manno; United States	Dayhana Bernal Rodriguez; Mexico	Brianda Cruz Lopez; Mexico
54 kg	Harper Schwettman; United States	Aireli Acosta Maldonado; Mexico	Naomi Castro Lopez; Mexico
58 kg	Lauren Samuel; United States	Samantha Victores Valadez; Mexico	Yoelys Sanchez Rodriguez; Panama
58 kg	Lauren Samuel; United States	Samantha Victores Valadez; Mexico	Alondra Castillo Martinez; Mexico
62 kg	Mila Mantanona; United States	Genesis Cosgallon Martinez; Mexico	Tatiana Gomez; Puerto Rico
66 kg	Emma Antoni; United States	Luna Nava Guzman; Mexico	Ximena Hernandez Hernandez; Mexico
66 kg	Emma Antoni; United States	Luna Nava Guzman; Mexico	Adriana Figuera Castillo; Venezuela

== Medal table ==
* Host nation (Mexico)

Rank	Nation	Gold	Silver	Bronze	Total
1	United States	25	2	2	29
2	Puerto Rico	2	3	6	11
3	Venezuela	2	2	1	5
4	Peru	1	0	1	2
5	Mexico*	0	14	25	39
6	Brazil	0	3	3	6
7	Ecuador	0	3	1	4
8	Guatemala	0	2	1	3
9	Colombia	0	1	2	3
10	Chile	0	0	2	2
11	Panama	0	0	1	1
Totals (11 entries)		30	30	45	105

== Team ranking ==
Rank	Men's freestyle		Men's Greco-Roman		Women's freestyle	
Rank	Team	Points	Team	Points	Team	Points
1	United States	240	United States	213	United States	250
2	Mexico	148	Mexico	180	Mexico	179
3	Brazil	96	Puerto Rico	90	Colombia	84
4	Puerto Rico	94	Brazil	66	Puerto Rico	69
5	Guatemala	57	Guatemala	64	Ecuador	52
6	Panama	43	Venezuela	50	Brazil	32
7	Venezuela	40	Chile	37	Chile	31
8	Colombia	38	Ecuador	30	Guatemala	30
9	Peru	25	Panama	28	Panama	25
10	Chile	20	Peru	15	Venezuela	15
11	Ecuador	15	Colombia	4	El Salvador	0
12	Argentina	12	Argentina	0		
