= American Samoa at the 2018 Summer Youth Olympics =

- IOC code: ASA
- NOC: American Samoa National Olympic Committee

in Buenos Aires, Argentina 6 – 18 October 2018
- Competitors: 12 in 4 sports
- Medals: Gold 0 Silver 0 Bronze 0 Total 0

Summer Youth Olympics appearances
- 2010; 2014; 2018

The American Samoa, recognized by the International Olympic Committee (IOC), represented by the National Olympic Committee of American Samoa (ASANOC), competed at the Games of the III Youth Olympiad in Buenos Aires, Argentina, from October 6 to 18, 2018.

== Athletics ==
Athlete	Event	Stage 1		Stage 2		Total	
Athlete	Event	Result	Rank	Result	Rank	Total	Rank
Iosefa Mauga Jr.	Boys' 100 m	11.99	35	11.61	34	23.60	34

== Beach handball ==
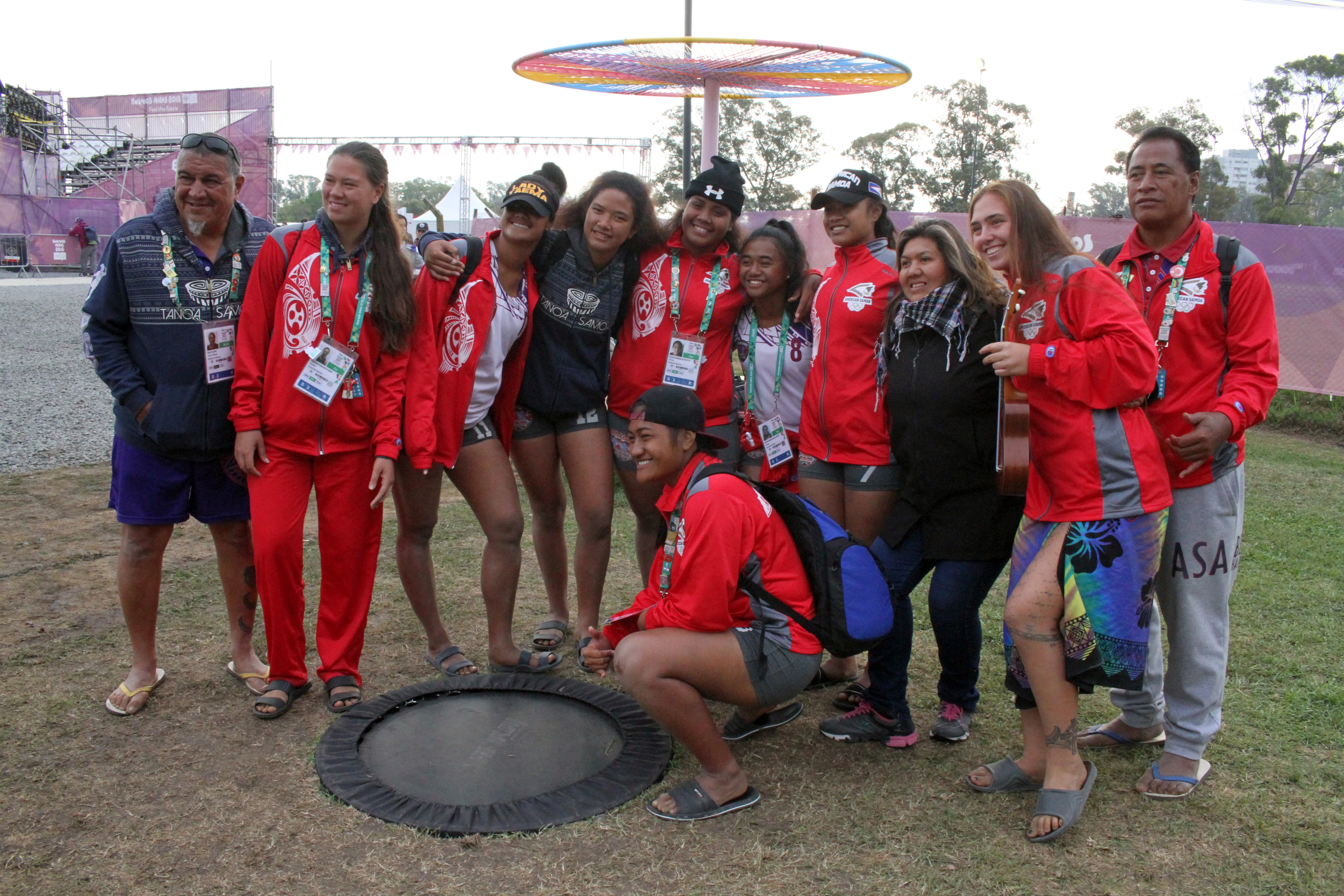
Team American Samoa in Beach handball after their last match

The girls' team qualified based on his performance (best oceania team) at the 2017 Youth Beach Handball World Championship in Mauritius.

- Frances Nautu
- Stephanie Floor
- Danielle Floor
- Roselyn Faleao
- Naomi A'asa
- Philomena Tofaeono
- Jasmine Liu
- Imeleta Mata'utia
- Coach: Carl Sagapolutele Floor
- Assistant coach (Defense): Joey Sagapolu

Event	Preliminary round						Main round / Consolidation round				Semifinal	Final / BM / PM	
Event	Opposition Score	Opposition Score	Opposition Score	Opposition Score	Opposition Score	Rank	Opposition Score	Opposition Score	Opposition Score	Rank	Opposition Score	Opposition Score	Rank
Girls' tournament	Hungary; L 0-2	Chinese Taipei; L 0-2	Mauritius; W 2-0	Russia; L 0-2	Croatia; L 0-2	5	Turkey; L 0-2	Venezuela; L 0-2	Hong Kong; L 0-2	5	Did not advance	Mauritius; W 2-1	11

== Boxing ==
Athlete	Event	Preliminary R1	Preliminary R2	Semifinals	Final / RM	Rank
Athlete	Event	Opposition Result	Opposition Result	Opposition Result	Opposition Result	Rank
Falaniko Tauta	-69 kg	Hasanov (AZE); L RSC	Elouarz (MAR); L 0-5	Did not advance	Belini (BRA); NC	5

== Wrestling ==
Key:
- VFA – Victory by Fall
- VSU – Without any point scored by the opponent
- VPO1 – With point(s) scored by the opponent

Athlete	Event	Group stage					Final / RM	Rank
Athlete	Event	Opposition Score	Opposition Score	Opposition Score	Opposition Score	Rank	Opposition Score	Rank
Ariston Bartley	Boys' Greco-Roman −92kg	Ayaydın (TUR); L 0 – 5 ^{VFA}	Wehib (EGY); L 0 – 8 ^{VSU}	—N/a		3 Q	Queiroz (BRA); L 0 – 10 ^{VSU}	6
Ioana Ludgate	Girls' Freestyle −73kg	White (CAN); L 0 – 6 ^{VFA}	Kagami (JPN); L 0 – 10 ^{VSU}	Marín (CUB); L 0 – 8 ^{VFA}	Fridlund (SWE); L 0 – 4 ^{VFA}	5 Q	Gök (TUR); L WO	10
