= Wrestling at the 2023 Pan American Games – Women's freestyle 76 kg =

Women's freestyle 76 at the 2023 Pan American Games
- Venue: Olympic Training Center in Ñuñoa
- Dates: November 3
- Competitors: 10 from 10 nations

Medalists
Gold medal	Milaimys Marín	Cuba
Silver medal	Tatiana Rentería	Colombia
Bronze medal	María Acosta	Venezuela
Bronze medal	Génesis Reasco	Ecuador

The women's freestyle 76 kg competition of the Wrestling events at the 2023 Pan American Games in Ñuñoa was held on November 3.

== Qualification ==
The winner of each weight category at the 2021 Junior Pan American Games in Cali, Colombia qualified directly, along with the top four at the 2022 Pan American Wrestling Championships and 2023 Pan American Wrestling Championships. The host country (Chile) is guaranteed a spot in each event, but its athletes must compete in both the 2022 and 2023 Pan American Championship. If Chile does not qualify at any of the first two events, it will take the fourth spot available at the 2023 Pan American Championships. A further six wildcards (four men and two women) will be awarded to nations without any qualified athlete but took part in the qualification tournaments.

== Schedule ==
All times are local (UTC−3)

Date	Time	Event
Wednesday, 3 November 2023	10:00	Round of 16
Wednesday, 3 November 2023	10:00	Quarterfinals
Wednesday, 3 November 2023	12:00	Semifinals
Wednesday, 3 November 2023	12:00	Repechage
Wednesday, 3 November 2023	17:00	Finals

== Results ==
Legend

- F — Won by fall

=== Main Bracket ===
Round of 16
Linda Machuca (ARG)	0
Milaimys Marín (CUB)	10
Emelyn Bautista (DOM)	0
Génesis Reasco (ECU)	10

Quarterfinals
Shauna Kuebeck (CAN)	0
Milaimys Marín (CUB)	10
María Acosta (VEN)	2^{F}
Mahealani Ramírez (URU)	0
Tatiana Rentería (COL)	10
Atzimba Landaverde (MEX)	0
Génesis Reasco (ECU)	9
Kylie Welker (USA)	7

Semifinals
Milaimys Marín (CUB)	8^{F}
María Acosta (VEN)	0
Tatiana Rentería (COL)	1
Génesis Reasco (ECU)	1

Finals
Milaimys Marín (CUB)	5
Tatiana Rentería (COL)	4

=== Repechage ===
Repechage round 1
Linda Machuca (ARG)	8
Shauna Kuebeck (CAN)	2^{F}

Bronze medal match
Shauna Kuebeck (CAN)	0
María Acosta (VEN)	3^{F}
Atzimba Landaverde (MEX)	0
Génesis Reasco (ECU)	8^{F}

== Final standing ==
Rank	Athlete
1st place, gold medalist(s)	Milaimys Marín (CUB)
2nd place, silver medalist(s)	Tatiana Rentería (COL)
3rd place, bronze medalist(s)	María Acosta (VEN)
3rd place, bronze medalist(s)	Génesis Reasco (ECU)
5	Shauna Kuebeck (CAN)
5	Atzimba Landaverde (MEX)
7	Kylie Welker (USA)
8	Linda Machuca (ARG)
9	Mahealani Ramírez (URU)
10	Emelyn Bautista (DOM)
