= Marilina =

Marilina may refer to:

== People ==
=== Given name ===
- Marilina Bertoldi (born 1988), Argentine musician
- Marilina Intrieri (born 1955), Italian politician and trade unionist
- Marilina Marino (born 1992), Italian actress
- Marilina Ross (born 1943), Argentine singer and actress

=== Middle name ===
- Linda Marilina Machuca (born 2001), Argentine freestyle wrestler
