= Boxing at the 2018 Summer Youth Olympics – Boys' welterweight =

Boxing competitions

Boys' welterweight boxing at the III Summer Youth Olympic Games
- Venue: Oceania Pavilion
- Date: 14–17 October
- Competitors: 6 from 6 nations

Medalists
1st place, gold medalist(s)		Brian Arregui	Argentina
2nd place, silver medalist(s)		Yassine Elouarz	Morocco
3rd place, bronze medalist(s)		Jakhongir Rakhmonov	Uzbekistan

The boys' welterweight boxing competition at the 2018 Summer Youth Olympics in Buenos Aires was held from 14 to 17 October at the Oceania Pavilion.

== Schedule ==
All times are local (UTC−3).

Date	Time	Round
Sunday, 14 October	14:08	Preliminary Round 1
Monday, 15 October	13:44	Preliminary Round 2
Tuesday, 16 October	14:01	Semifinals
Wednesday, 17 October	14:00	Finals

== Results ==
Preliminary Round 1
Jakhongir Rakhmonov (UZB)	2
Brian Arregui (ARG)	3
Falaniko Tauta (ASA)
Nijat Hasanov (AZE)	RSC

Preliminary Round 2
Kauê Belini (BRA)	1
Jakhongir Rakhmonov (UZB)	4
Falaniko Tauta (ASA)	0
Yassine Elouarz (MAR)	5

Semifinals
Brian Arregui (ARG)	3
Jakhongir Rakhmonov (UZB)	2
Yassine Elouarz (MAR)	4
Nijat Hasanov (AZE)	1

Final
Brian Arregui (ARG)	5
Yassine Elouarz (MAR)	0
Third place
Jakhongir Rakhmonov (UZB)	5
Nijat Hasanov (AZE)	0

== Final standings ==
Rank	Athlete
1st place, gold medalist(s)	Brian Arregui (ARG)
2nd place, silver medalist(s)	Yassine Elouarz (MAR)
3rd place, bronze medalist(s)	Jakhongir Rakhmonov (UZB)
4	Nijat Hasanov (AZE)
5	Falaniko Tauta (ASA)
6	Kauê Belini (BRA)
