= 2025 World Wrestling Championships – Women's freestyle 76 kg =

Wrestling competitions

Women's freestyle 76 kg at the 2025 World Championships
- Venue: Arena Zagreb
- Dates: 16–17 September 2025
- Competitors: 19 from 17 nations

Medalists
gold medal	Génesis Reasco	Ecuador
silver medal	Aiperi Medet Kyzy	Kyrgyzstan
bronze medal	Kylie Welker	United States
bronze medal	Milaimys Marín	Cuba

The women's freestyle 76 kilograms is a competition featured at the 2025 World Wrestling Championships, and was held in Zagreb, Croatia on 16 and 17 September 2025.

This freestyle wrestling competition consists of a single-elimination tournament, with a repechage used to determine the winner of two bronze medals. The two finalists face off for gold and silver medals. Each wrestler who loses to one of the two finalists moves into the repechage, culminating in a pair of bronze medal matches, featuring the semifinal losers each facing the remaining repechage opponent from their half of the bracket.

== Results ==
Legend

- F — Won by fall

=== Final ===
Final
Aiperi Medet Kyzy (KGZ)	2
Génesis Reasco (ECU)	4

=== Top half ===
Round of 32
Kristina Shumova (UWW)	2
Vanesa Georgieva (BUL)	5

Round of 16
Aiperi Medet Kyzy (KGZ)	10
Elmira Yasin (TUR)	0
Vanesa Georgieva (BUL)	0
Kylie Welker (USA)	6^{F}
Anastasiya Alpyeyeva (UKR)	5^{F}
Ozoda Zaripboeva (UZB)	2
Brianna Fraser (CAN)	0
Enkh-Amaryn Davaanasan (MGL)	6

Quarterfinals
Aiperi Medet Kyzy (KGZ)	8
Kylie Welker (USA)	3
Anastasiya Alpyeyeva (UKR)	10
Enkh-Amaryn Davaanasan (MGL)	0

Semifinals
Aiperi Medet Kyzy (KGZ)	10
Anastasiya Alpyeyeva (UKR)	5

=== Bottom half ===
Round of 32
Kamilė Gaučaitė (LTU)	1
Enrica Rinaldi (ITA)	2
Jeong Seo-yeon (KOR)	0
Qiandegenchagan (CHN)	4^{F}

Round of 16
Génesis Reasco (ECU)	4
Priya Malik (IND)	2
Enrica Rinaldi (ITA)	4
Elmira Syzdykova (KAZ)	3
Nodoka Yamamoto (JPN)	6
Qiandegenchagan (CHN)	5
Anastasiya Zimiankova (UWW)	0
Milaimys Marín (CUB)	10

Quarterfinals
Génesis Reasco (ECU)	11
Enrica Rinaldi (ITA)	0
Nodoka Yamamoto (JPN)	0
Milaimys Marín (CUB)	10

Semifinals
Génesis Reasco (ECU)	5
Milaimys Marín (CUB)	3

=== Repechage ===
Repechage round 2
Elmira Yasin (TUR)	0
Kylie Welker (USA)	10
Priya Malik (IND)	4^{F}
Enrica Rinaldi (ITA)	0

Bronze medals
Kylie Welker (USA)	6
Anastasiya Alpyeyeva (UKR)	2
Priya Malik (IND)	0
Milaimys Marín (CUB)	10

== Final standing ==
Rank	Athlete
1st place, gold medalist(s)	Génesis Reasco (ECU)
2nd place, silver medalist(s)	Aiperi Medet Kyzy (KGZ)
3rd place, bronze medalist(s)	Kylie Welker (USA)
3rd place, bronze medalist(s)	Milaimys Marín (CUB)
5	Anastasiya Alpyeyeva (UKR)
5	Priya Malik (IND)
7	Qiandegenchagan (CHN)
8	Enrica Rinaldi (ITA)
9	Enkh-Amaryn Davaanasan (MGL)
10	Nodoka Yamamoto (JPN)
11	Vanesa Georgieva (BUL)
12	Elmira Syzdykova (KAZ)
13	Kristina Shumova (UWW)
14	Kamilė Gaučaitė (LTU)
15	Ozoda Zaripboeva (UZB)
16	Jeong Seo-yeon (KOR)
17	Brianna Fraser (CAN)
18	Anastasiya Zimiankova (UWW)
19	Elmira Yasin (TUR)
