= 2024 U23 World Wrestling Championships – Women's freestyle 72 kg =

Wrestling competitions

Women's freestyle 72 kg at the 2024 U23 World Championships
- Venue: Tirana Olympic Park
- Dates: 24–25 October
- Competitors: 16 from 14 nations

Medalists
gold medal	Kylie Welker	United States
silver medal	Vianne Rouleau	Canada
bronze medal	Anastasiya Alpyeyeva	Ukraine
bronze medal	Viktoryia Radzkova	Authorised Neutral Athletes

The women's freestyle 72 is a competition featured at the 2024 U23 World Wrestling Championships, and will be held in Tirana, Albania on 24 and 25 October 2024.

This freestyle wrestling competition consists of a single-elimination tournament, with a repechage used to determine the winner of two bronze medals. The two finalists face off for gold and silver medals. Each wrestler who loses to one of the two finalists moves into the repechage, culminating in a pair of bronze medal matches featuring the semifinal losers each facing the remaining repechage opponent from their half of the bracket.

== Results ==
Legend

- F — Won by fall
- R — Retired

=== Main bracket ===
Round of 16
Veronika Vilk (CRO)	8
Haticenur Sarı (TUR)	9
Anastassiya Panassovich (KAZ)	0
Kylie Welker (USA)	11
Daniela Tkachuk (POL)	0
Anastasiya Alpyeyeva (UKR)	4^{F}
Lilly Schneider (GER)	1
María Ceballos (COL)	6
Viktoryia Radzkova (AIN)	4
Dorjsürengiin Tsogzolmaa (MGL)	0
Yuka Fujikura (JPN)	4
Kritika Jamwal (IND)	2
Olesia Bezuglova (AIN)	1
Vianne Rouleau (CAN)	2^{F}
Vincenza Amendola (ITA)	0
Gao Yufei (CHN)	5^{F}

Quarterfinals
Haticenur Sarı (TUR)	0
Kylie Welker (USA)	10
Anastasiya Alpyeyeva (UKR)	13
María Ceballos (COL)	2
Viktoryia Radzkova (AIN)	3
Yuka Fujikura (JPN)	3
Vianne Rouleau (CAN)	4
Gao Yufei (CHN)	0^{R}

Semifinals
Kylie Welker (USA)	3
Anastasiya Alpyeyeva (UKR)	1
Viktoryia Radzkova (AIN)	0
Vianne Rouleau (CAN)	10

Final
Kylie Welker (USA)	7^{F}
Vianne Rouleau (CAN)	0

=== Repechage ===
Repechage round 1
Anastassiya Panassovich (KAZ)	3
Haticenur Sarı (TUR)	5
Olesia Bezuglova (AIN)	4^{F}
Gao Yufei (CHN)	0

Bronze medals
Haticenur Sarı (TUR)	0
Anastasiya Alpyeyeva (UKR)	11^{F}
Olesia Bezuglova (AIN)	0
Viktoryia Radzkova (AIN)	4^{F}

== Final standing ==
Rank	Athlete
1st place, gold medalist(s)	Kylie Welker (USA)
2nd place, silver medalist(s)	Vianne Rouleau (CAN)
3rd place, bronze medalist(s)	Anastasiya Alpyeyeva (UKR)
3rd place, bronze medalist(s)	Viktoryia Radzkova (AIN)
5	Haticenur Sarı (TUR)
5	Olesia Bezuglova (AIN)
7	Gao Yufei (CHN)
8	María Ceballos (COL)
9	Yuka Fujikura (JPN)
10	Veronika Vilk (CRO)
11	Anastassiya Panassovich (KAZ)
12	Kritika Jamwal (IND)
13	Lilly Schneider (GER)
14	Daniela Tkachuk (POL)
15	Dorjsürengiin Tsogzolmaa (MGL)
16	Vincenza Amendola (ITA)
