= Wrestling at the 2018 Summer Youth Olympics – Boys' Greco-Roman 92 kg =

Boys' Greco-Roman 92kg at the III Summer Youth Olympic Games
- Venue: Asia Pavilion
- Date: 12 October
- Competitors: 6 from 6 nations

Medalists
1st place, gold medalist(s)		Mohammad Nosrati	Iran
2nd place, silver medalist(s)		Osman Ayaydın	Turkey
3rd place, bronze medalist(s)		Mukhammad Evloev	Russia

The Boys' Greco-Roman 92 kg competition at the 2018 Summer Youth Olympics was held on 12 October, at the Asia Pavilion.

== Competition format ==
As there were less than six wrestlers in a weight category, the pool phase will be run as a single group competing in a round robin format. Ranking within the groups is used to determine the pairings for the final phase.

== Schedule ==
All times are in local time (UTC-3).

Date	Time	Round
Friday, 12 October 2018	10:15; 10:40; 11:05; 18:05	Round 1 Round 2 Round 3 Finals

== Results ==
Legend

- F — Won by fall

Group stages

Qualified for the Gold Medal Match
Qualified for the Bronze Medal Match
Qualified for the 5th/6th Place Match

Group A

Pos	Athlete	Pld	W	L	CP	TP	Qualification
1	Osman Ayaydın (TUR)	2	2	0	8	6	Gold-medal match
2	Shady Wehib (EGY)	2	1	1	5	9	Bronze-medal match
3	Ariston Bartley (ASA)	2	0	2	0	0	Classification 5th/6th place match

Source: UWW

	Score		CP
Osman Ayaydın (TUR)	4–0 Fall	Ariston Bartley (ASA)	5–0 VFA
Shady Wehib (EGY)	1–2	Osman Ayaydın (TUR)	1–3 VPO1
Ariston Bartley (ASA)	0–8	Shady Wehib (EGY)	0–4 VSU

Group B

Pos	Athlete	Pld	W	L	CP	TP	Qualification
1	Mohammad Nosrati (IRI)	2	2	0	8	6	Gold-medal match
2	Mukhammad Evloev (RUS)	2	1	1	5	9	Bronze-medal match
3	Igor Queiroz (BRA)	2	0	2	0	0	Classification 5th/6th place match

Source: UWW

	Score		CP
Mohammad Nosrati (IRI)	5–0	Igor Queiroz (BRA)	3–0 VPO
Mukhammad Evloev (RUS)	3–5	Mohammad Nosrati (IRI)	1–3 VPO1
Igor Queiroz (BRA)	0–7	Mukhammad Evloev (RUS)	0–3 VPO

=== Finals ===
Gold medal match
Osman Ayaydın (TUR)	1
Mohammad Nosrati (IRI)	3

Bronze medal match
Shady Wehib (EGY)	2
Mukhammad Evloev (RUS)	11

Classification 5th/6th place match
Ariston Bartley (ASA)	0
Igor Queiroz (BRA)	10

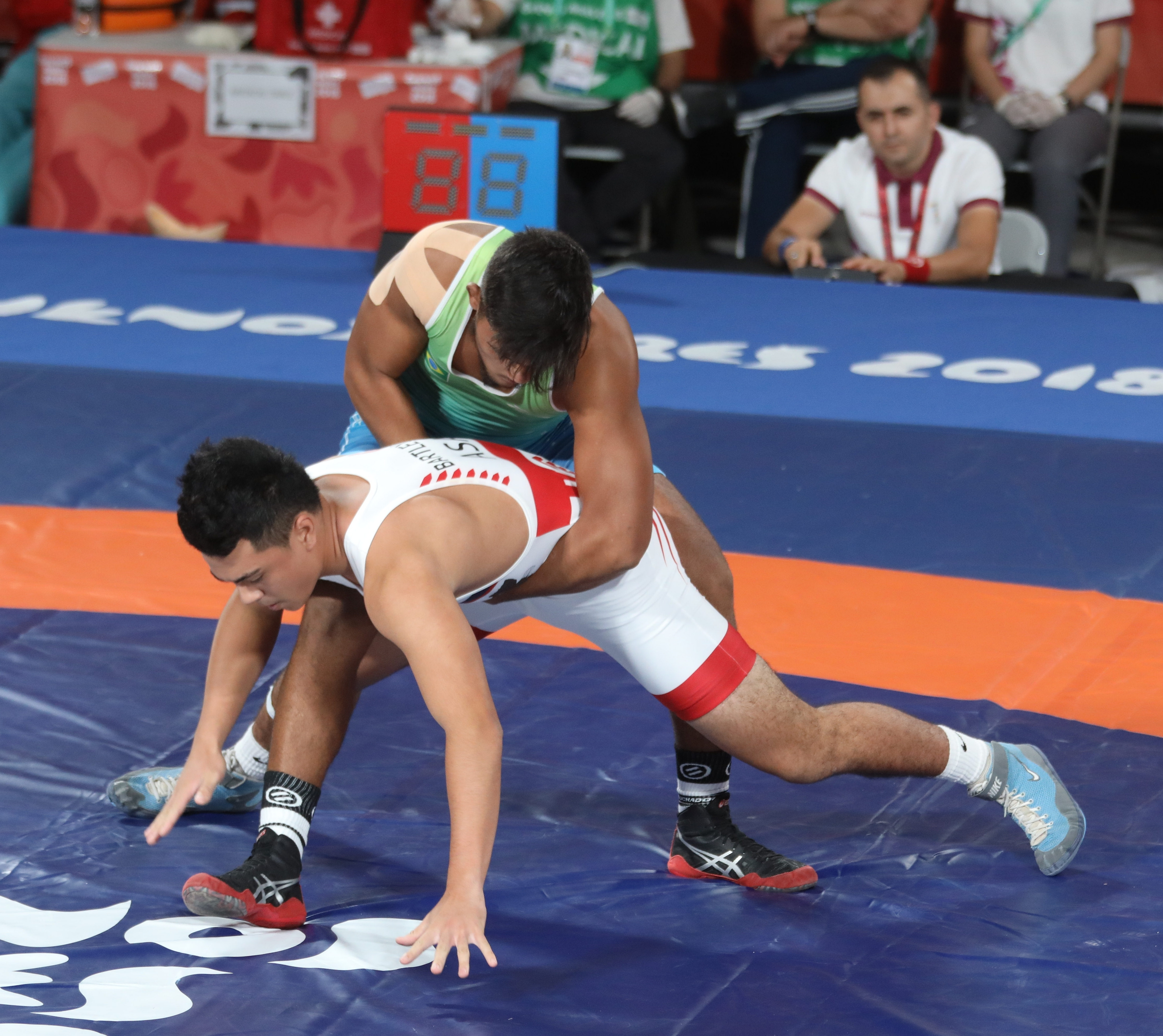
Classification 5th/6th Place Match: Ariston Bartley vs. Igor Queiroz (on top)

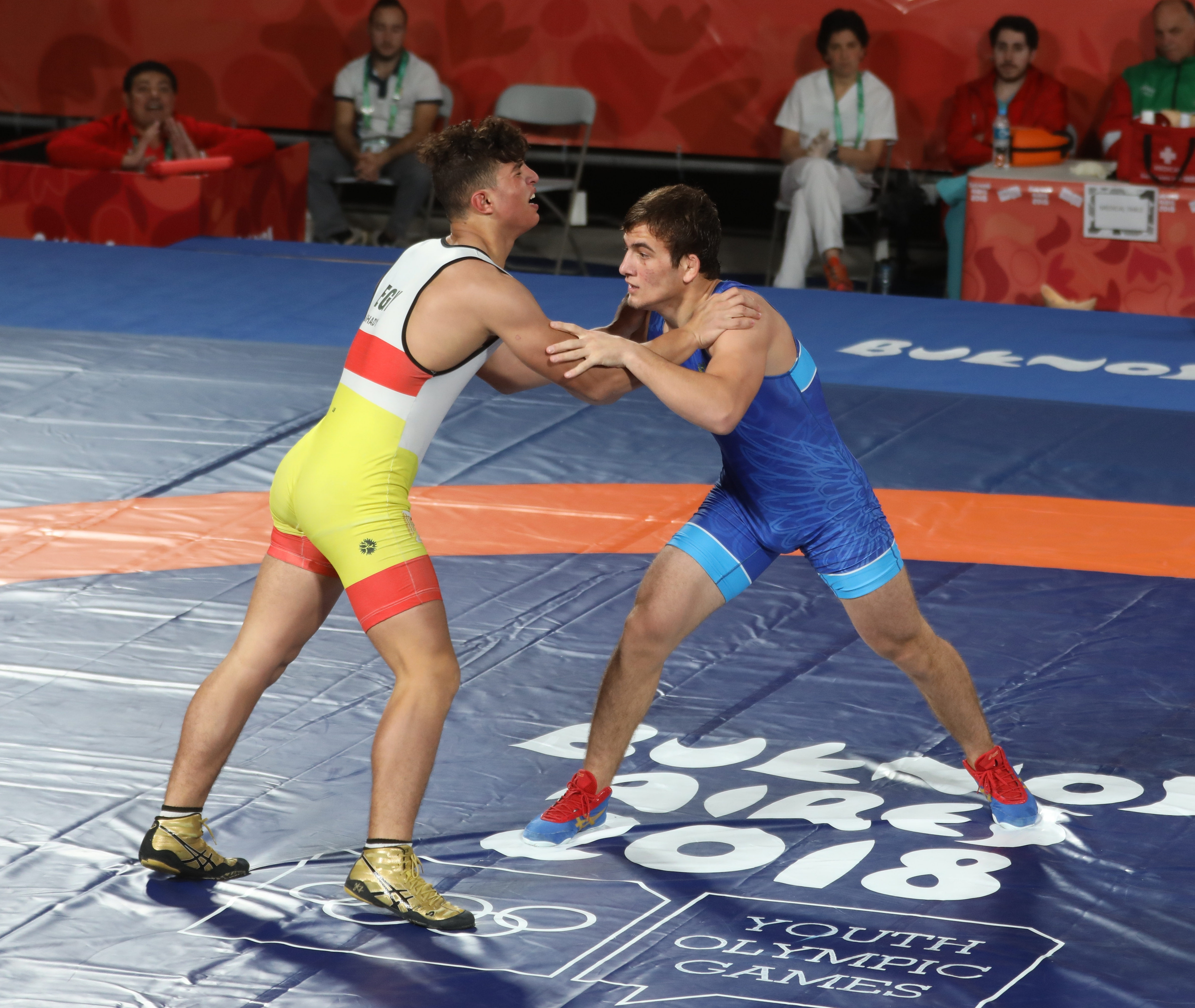
Bronze Medal Match: Shady Wehib (left) vs. Mukhammad Evloev

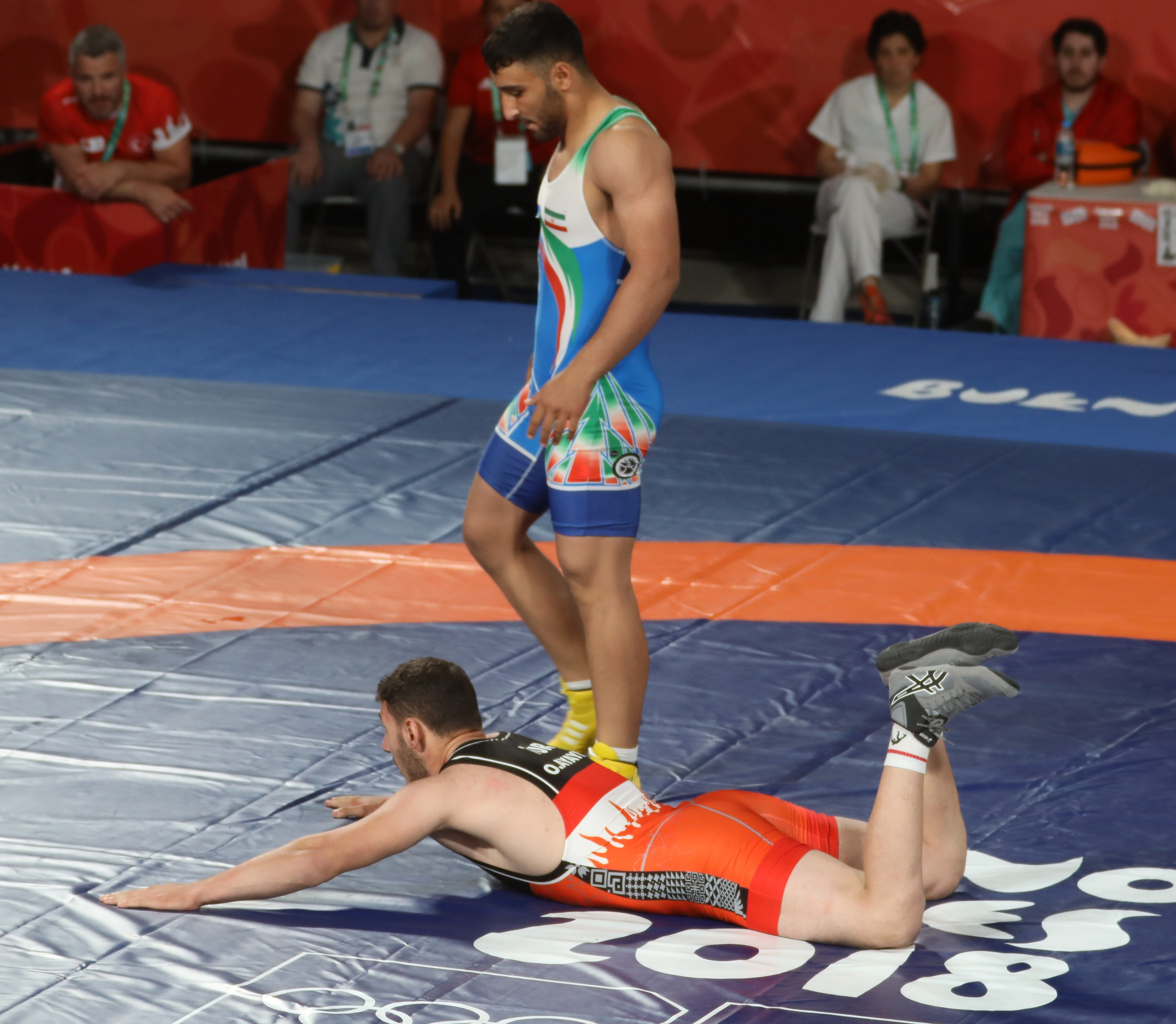
Gold Medal Match: Osman Ayaydın (in front) vs. Mohammad Nosrati

== Final rankings ==
Rank	Athlete
1st place, gold medalist(s)	Mohammad Nosrati (IRI)
2nd place, silver medalist(s)	Osman Ayaydın (TUR)
3rd place, bronze medalist(s)	Mukhammad Evloev (RUS)
4	Shady Wehib (EGY)
5	Igor Queiroz (BRA)
6	Ariston Bartley (ASA)

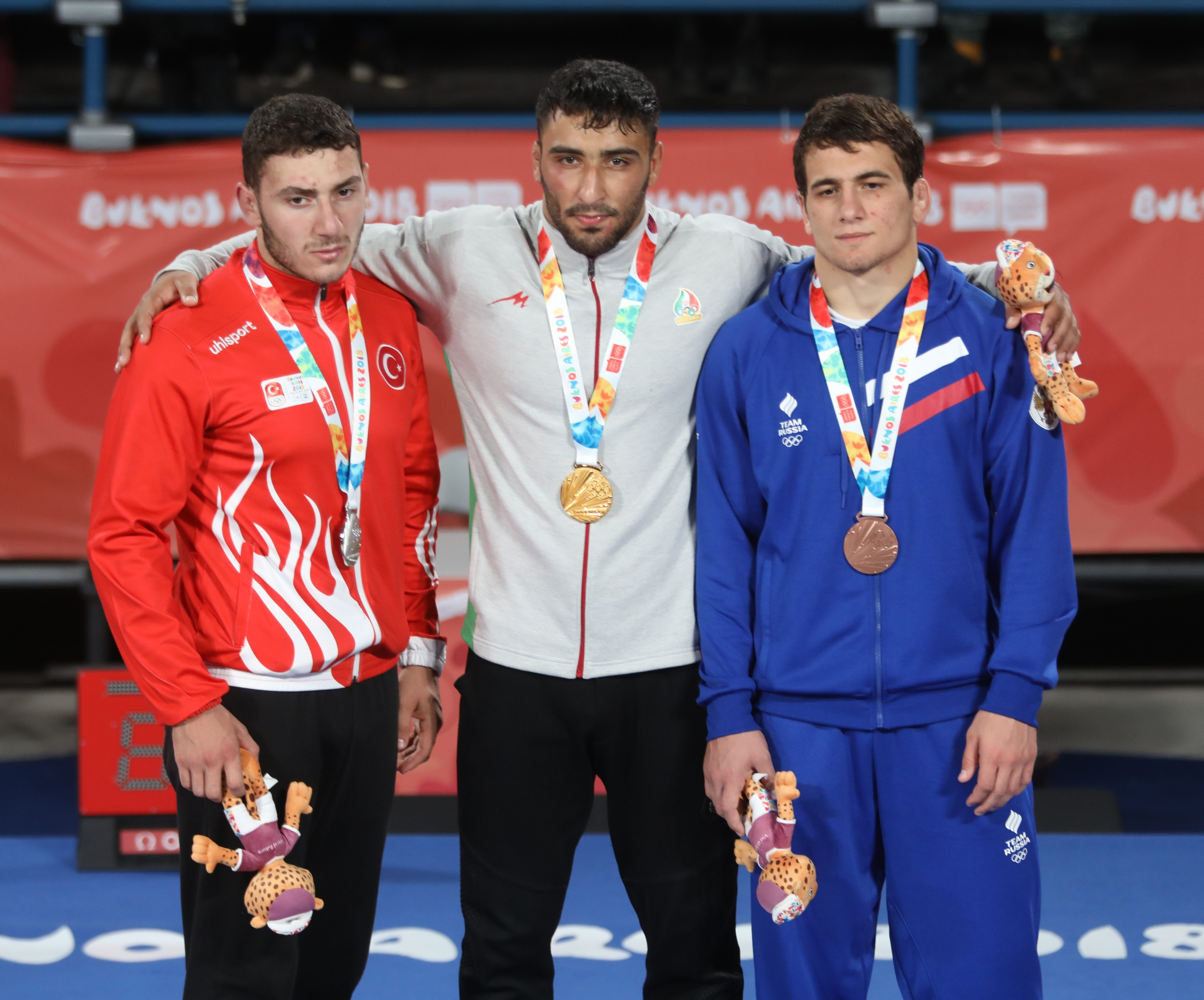
Victory ceremony (from left to right): Osman Ayaydın (Silver), Mohammad Nosrati (Gold), Mukhammad Evloev (Bronze)
