= Wrestling at the 2018 Summer Youth Olympics – Girls' freestyle 73 kg =

Girls' freestyle 73kg at the III Summer Youth Olympic Games
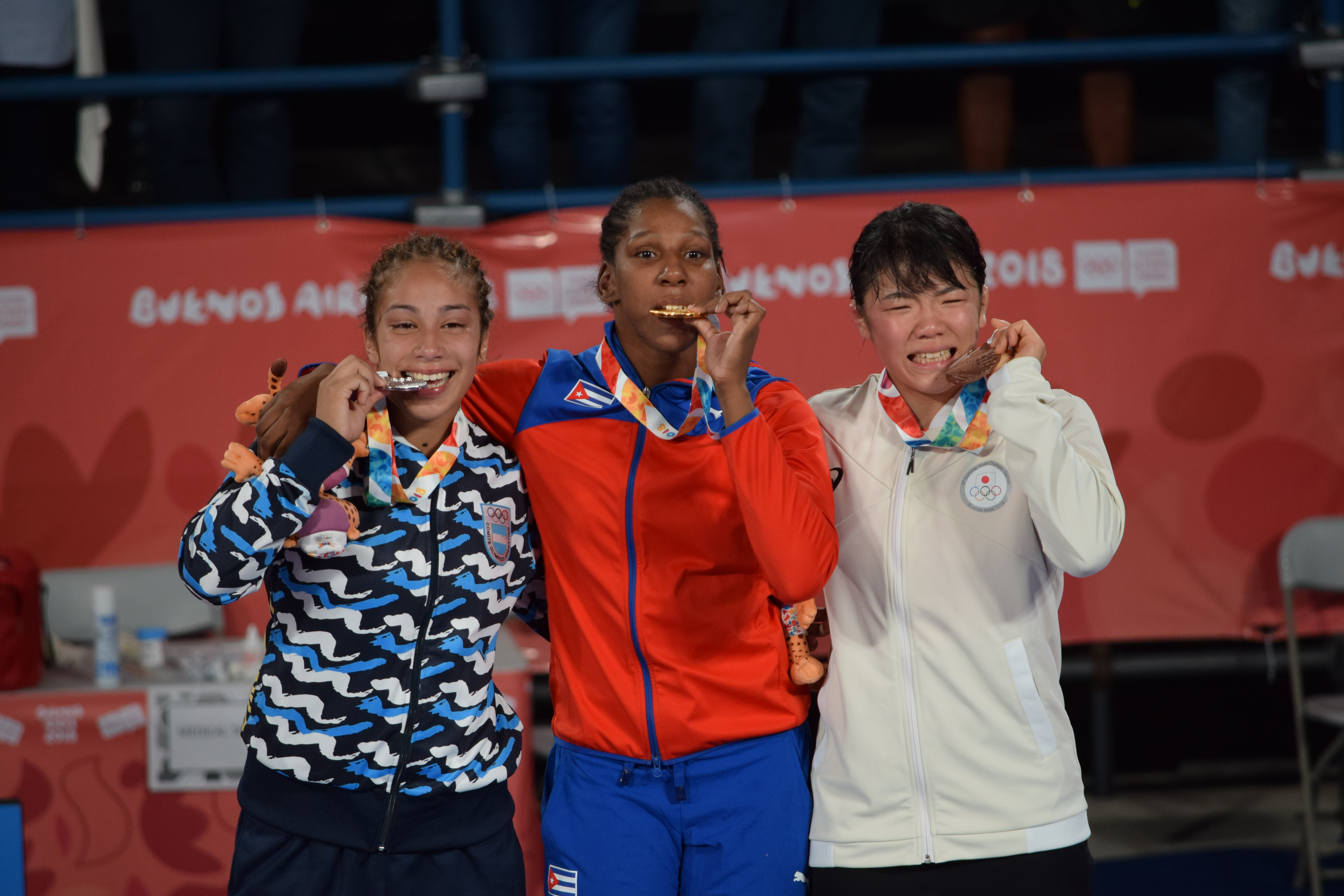
- The medalists
- Venue: Asia Pavilion
- Date: 13 October 2018
- Competitors: 10 from 10 nations

Medalists
1st place, gold medalist(s)		Milaimys Marín; Cuba
2nd place, silver medalist(s)		Linda Machuca; Argentina
3rd place, bronze medalist(s)		Yuka Kagami; Japan

The girls' freestyle 73 kg competition at the 2018 Summer Youth Olympics was held on 13 October, at the Asia Pavilion.

== Competition format ==
As there were ten wrestlers in a weight category, the pool phase will be run as a single group competing in a round-robin format. Ranking within the groups is used to determine the pairings for the final phase.

== Schedule ==
All times are in local time (UTC-3).

Date	Time	Round
Saturday, 13 October 2018	10:20; 11:10; 12:00; 12:50; 13:40; 19:10	Round 1 Round 2 Round 3 Round 4 Round 5 Finals

== Results ==
Legend

- F — Won by fall
- WO — Won by Walkover

Group Stages

Qualified for the Gold-medal match
Qualified for the Bronze-medal match
Qualified for the 5th/6th Place Match
Qualified for the 7th/8th Place Match
Qualified for the 9th/10th Place Match

Group A

Pos	Athlete	Pld	W	L	CP	TP	Qualification
1	Linda Machuca (ARG)	4	4	0	14	31	Gold-medal match
2	Kseniya Dzibuk (BLR)	4	3	1	12	33	Bronze-medal match
3	Svetlana Oknazarova (UZB)	4	2	2	11	31	Classification 5th/6th place match
4	Khadija Jlassi (TUN)	4	1	3	8	14	Classification 7th/8th place match
5	Vahide Gök (TUR)	4	0	4	0	2	Classification 9th/10th place match

Source: UWW

	Score		CP
Kseniya Dzibuk (BLR)	13–4	Khadija Jlassi (TUN)	3–1 VPO1
Vahide Gök (TUR)	1–8 Fall	Linda Machuca (ARG)	0–5 VFA
Svetlana Oknazarova (UZB)	2–6	Kseniya Dzibuk (BLR)	1–3 VPO1
Khadija Jlassi (TUN)	6–1 Fall	Vahide Gök (TUR)	5–0 VFA
Linda Machuca (ARG)	8–6	Kseniya Dzibuk (BLR)	3–1 VPO1
Svetlana Oknazarova (UZB)	13–2	Khadija Jlassi (TUN)	4–1 VSU1
Vahide Gök (TUR)	0–8 Fall	Kseniya Dzibuk (BLR)	0–5 VFA
Linda Machuca (ARG)	10–9	Svetlana Oknazarova (UZB)	3–1 VPO1
Khadija Jlassi (TUN)	2–5	Linda Machuca (ARG)	1–3 VPO1
Vahide Gök (TUR)	0–7 Fall	Svetlana Oknazarova (UZB)	0–5 VFA

Group B

Pos	Athlete	Pld	W	L	CP	TP	Qualification
1	Milaimys Marín (CUB)	4	4	0	15	30	Gold-medal match
2	Yuka Kagami (JPN)	4	3	1	13	33	Bronze-medal match
3	Julia Fridlund (SWE)	4	2	2	11	16	Classification 5th/6th place match
4	Anika White (CAN)	4	1	3	5	6	Classification 7th/8th place match
5	Ioana Ludgate (ASA)	4	0	4	0	0	Classification 9th/10th place match

Source: UWW

	Score		CP
Milaimys Marín (CUB)	4–1	Yuka Kagami (JPN)	3–1 VPO1
Ioana Ludgate (ASA)	0–6 Fall	Anika White (CAN)	0–5 VFA
Julia Fridlund (SWE)	0–8	Milaimys Marín (CUB)	0–3 VPO
Yuka Kagami (JPN)	10–0	Ioana Ludgate (ASA)	4–0 VSU
Anika White (CAN)	0–10	Milaimys Marín (CUB)	0–4 VSU
Julia Fridlund (SWE)	2–12	Yuka Kagami (JPN)	1–4 VSU1
Ioana Ludgate (ASA)	0–8 Fall	Milaimys Marín (CUB)	0–5 VFA
Anika White (CAN)	0–10 Fall	Julia Fridlund (SWE)	0–5 VFA
Yuka Kagami (JPN)	10–0	Anika White (CAN)	4–0 VSU
Ioana Ludgate (ASA)	0–4 Fall	Julia Fridlund (SWE)	0–5 VFA

=== Finals ===
Gold-medal match
Linda Machuca (ARG)	0
Milaimys Marín (CUB)	4^{F}

Bronze-medal match
Kseniya Dzibuk (BLR)	0
Yuka Kagami (JPN)	8

Classification 5th/6th place match
Svetlana Oknazarova (UZB)	0
Julia Fridlund (SWE)	2^{F}

Classification 7th/8th place match
Khadija Jlassi (TUN)	4^{F}
Anika White (CAN)	0

Classification 9th/10th place match
Vahide Gök (TUR)	WO
Ioana Ludgate (ASA)

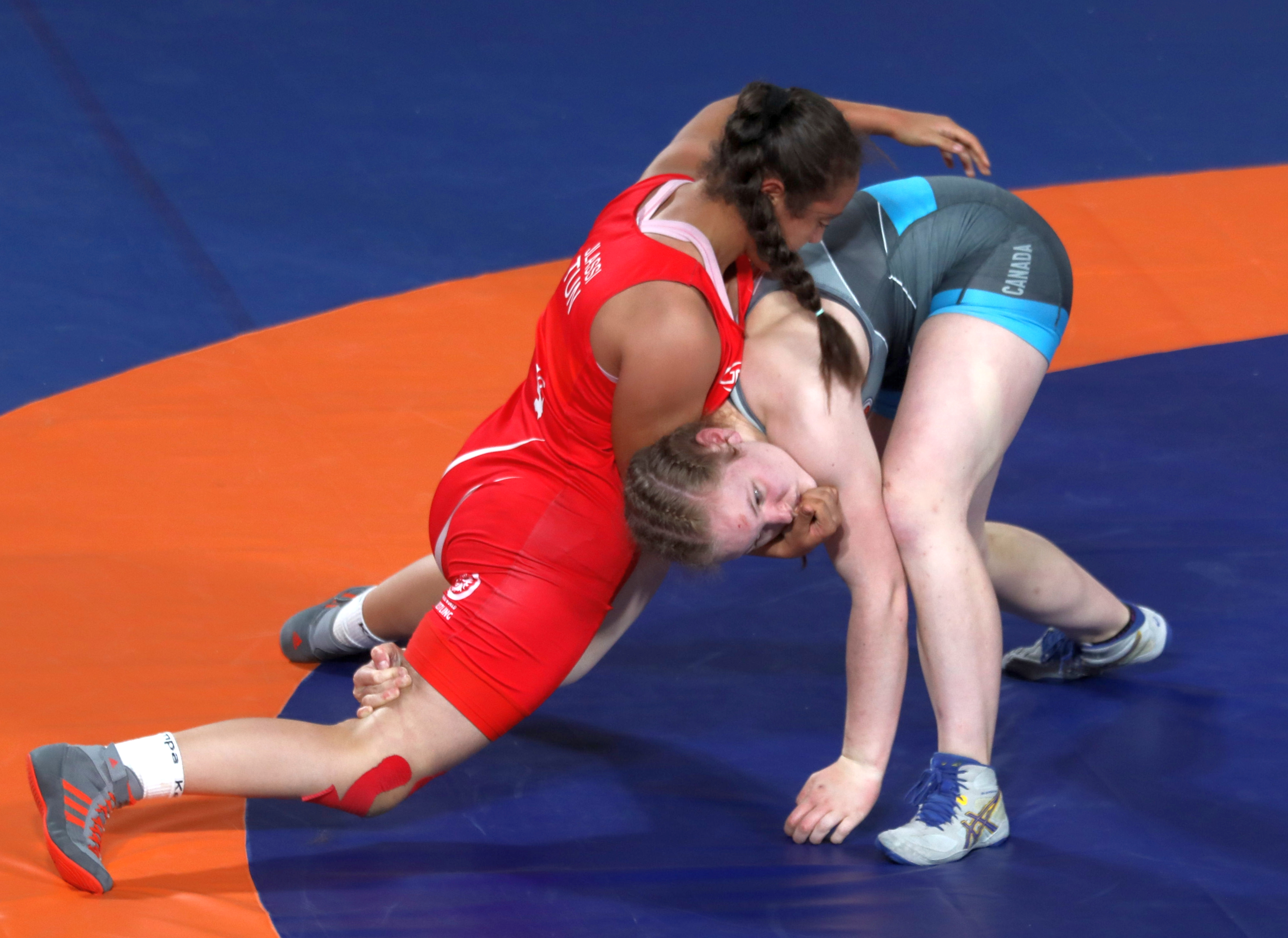
Classification 7th/8th Place

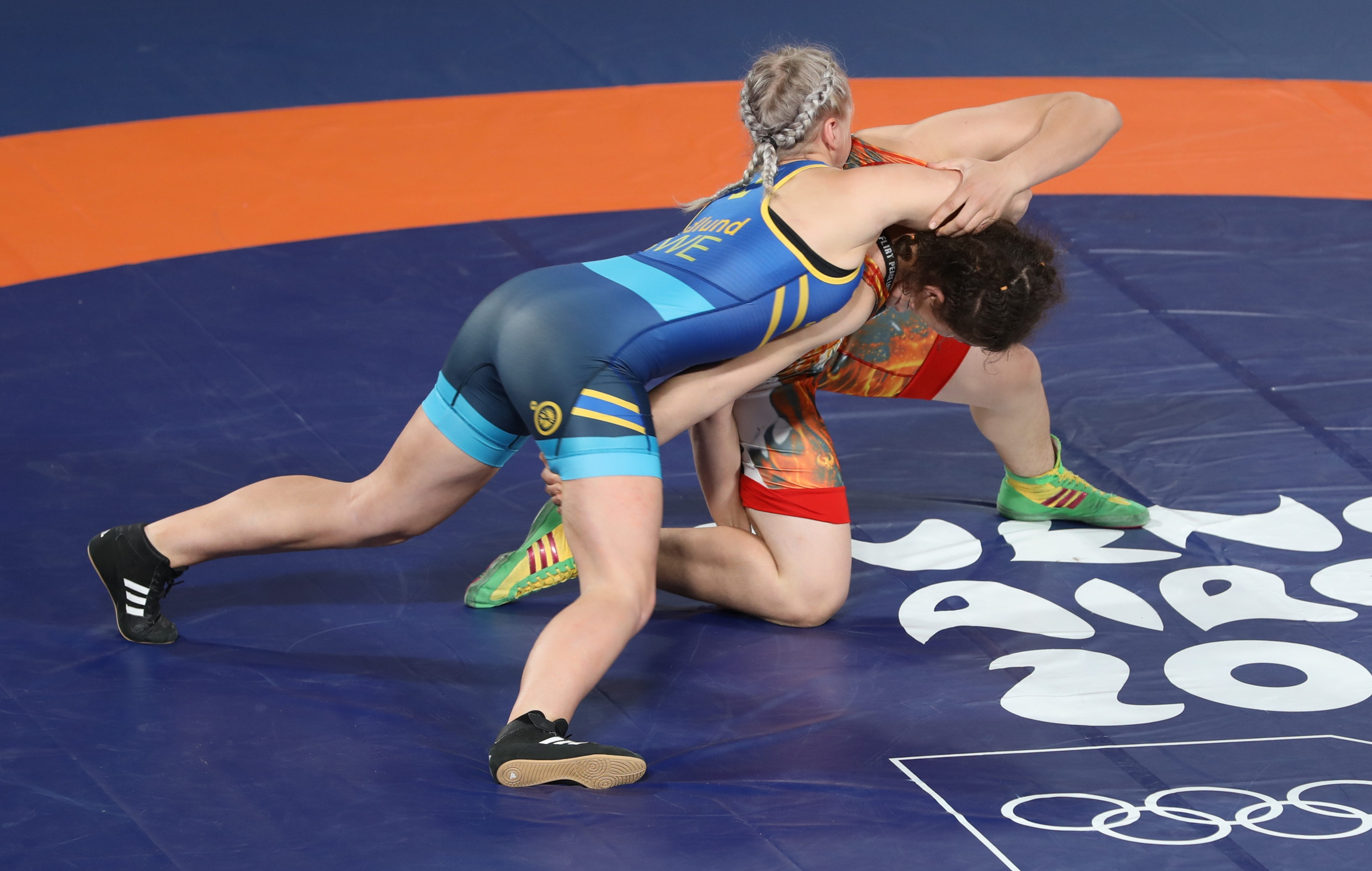
Classification 5th/6th Place

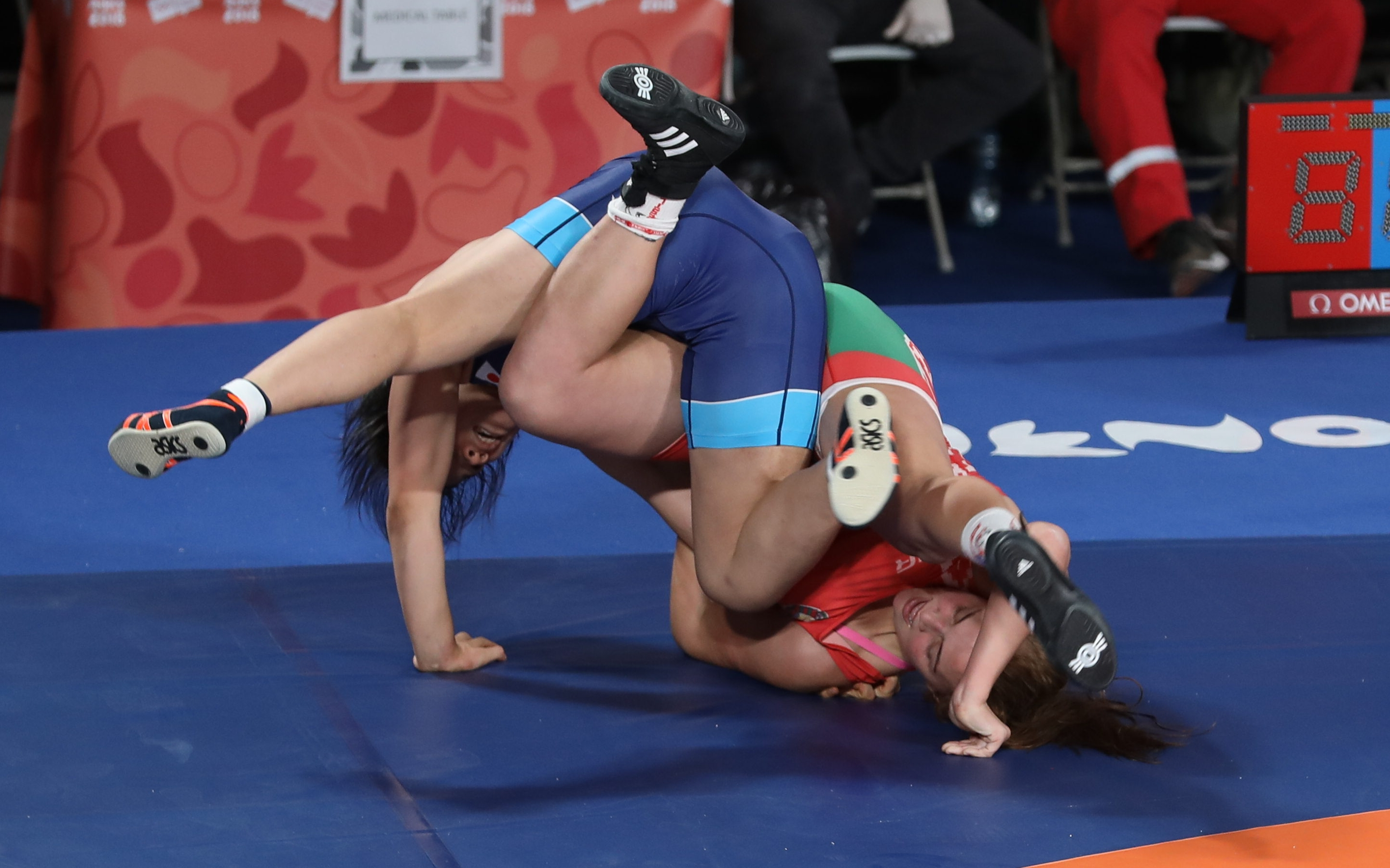
Bronze-medal match

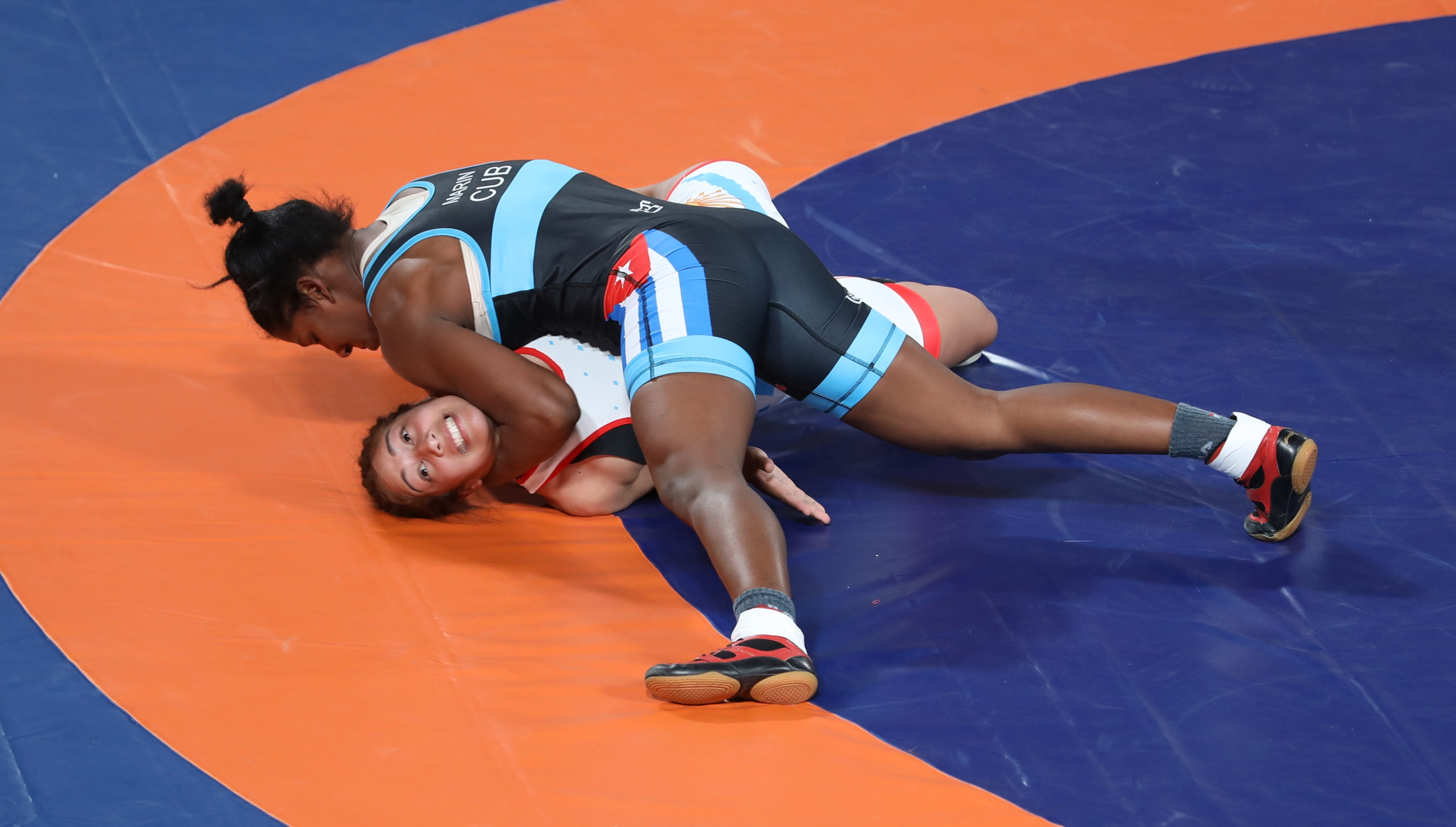
Gold-medal match

== Final rankings ==
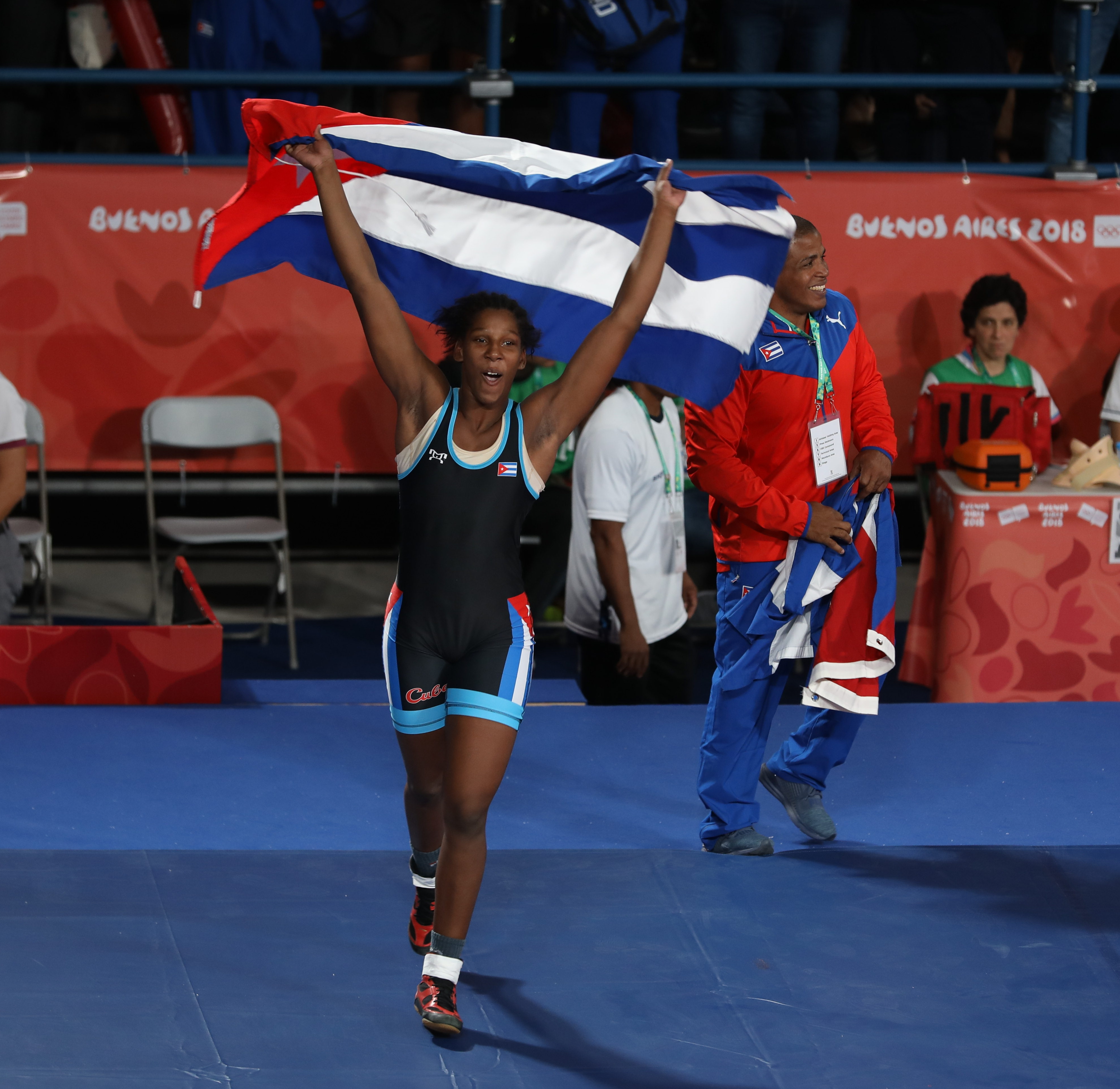
Milaimys Marín (Youth Olympic Games Champion) after the Gold-medal match

Rank	Athlete
1st place, gold medalist(s)	Milaimys Marín (CUB)
2nd place, silver medalist(s)	Linda Machuca (ARG)
3rd place, bronze medalist(s)	Yuka Kagami (JPN)
4	Kseniya Dzibuk (BLR)
5	Julia Fridlund (SWE)
6	Svetlana Oknazarova (UZB)
7	Khadija Jlassi (TUN)
8	Anika White (CAN)
9	Vahide Gök (TUR)
10	Ioana Ludgate (ASA)
