= Kylie Welker =

American wrestler (born 2003)

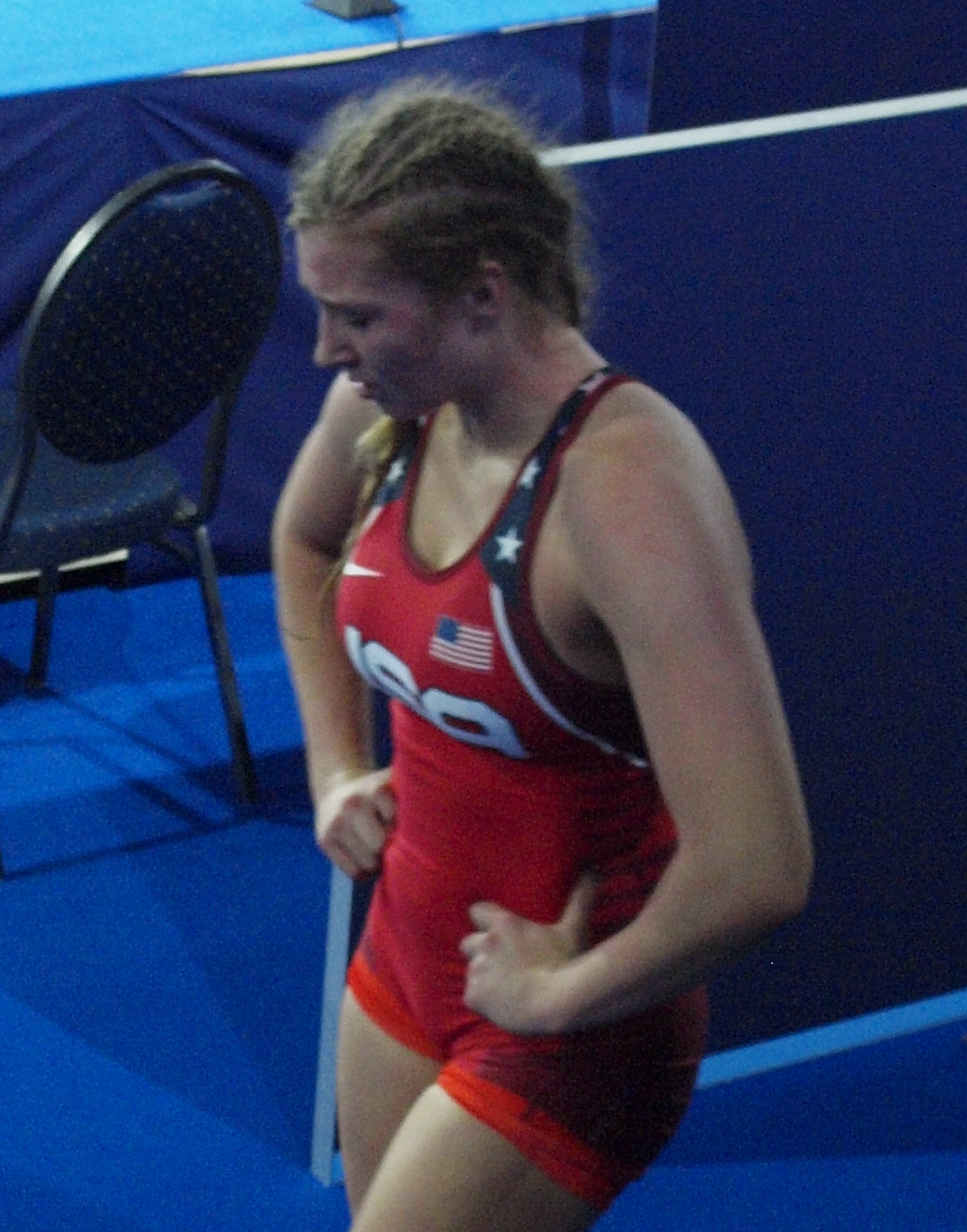

Personal information
- Full name: Kylie Renee Welker
- Born: 17 December 2003 (age 22) Franksville, Wisconsin, U.S.
- Height: 1.72 m (5 ft 8 in)
- Weight: 76 kg (168 lb; 12.0 st)

Sport
- Country: United States
- Sport: Wrestling
- Weight class: 76 kg
- Event: Freestyle
- College team: Iowa
Medal record
Women's freestyle wrestling
Representing United States
World Championships
Bronze medal – third place	2024 Tirana	72 kg
Bronze medal – third place	2025 Zagreb	76 kg
Pan American Championships
Gold medal – first place	2025 Monterrey	76 kg
Gold medal – first place	2026 Coralville	76 kg
Grand Prix
Gold medal – first place	2014 Madrid	72 kg
World U23 Championships
Gold medal – first place	2024 Tirana	72 kg
Gold medal – first place	2025 Novi Sad	76 kg
Gold medal – first place	2026 Las Vegas	76 kg
Bronze medal – third place	2021 Belgrade	76 kg
U20 Pan American Championships
Gold medal – first place	2023 Santiago	76 kg
World Junior Championships
Gold medal – first place	2021 Ufa	76 kg
World Cadets Championships
Bronze medal – third place	2019 Sofia	61 kg

Kylie Welker (born 17 December 2003) is an American freestyle wrestler.

== Wrestling career ==
=== International ===
She reached the semifinals of the 2024 World Wrestling Championships held in Tirana, Albania, in the women's freestyle 72kg competition by defeating Canadian Aleah Nickel with a 10-0 technical superiority in the first round, French Pauline Lecarpentier 4–0 in the second round, and Chinese Jiang Qian in the quarterfinals with a 7–2 lead. In the semifinals, she lost to Japan's Ami Ishii with a 12-1 technical superiority. She defeated Romanian Alexandra Anghel 5–2 in the bronze medal match and won the bronze medal.

She won one of the bronze medals in the women's 76 kg event at the 2025 World Wrestling Championships held in Zagreb, Croatia.

=== NCAA ===
Welker competes for the University of Iowa's Hawkeyes women's wrestling team, where she has won both team and individual titles at the National Collegiate Women's Wrestling Championships.

She was a three-time finalist for the Anthony-Maroulis Trophy (2024, 2025 and 2026).

== Championships and accomplishments ==
=== Freestyle wrestling ===
- NCAA
  - 2026 NCAA Women’s Wrestling Champion - 180 lbs.
