= Milaimys Marín =

Cuban freestyle wrestler (born 2001)

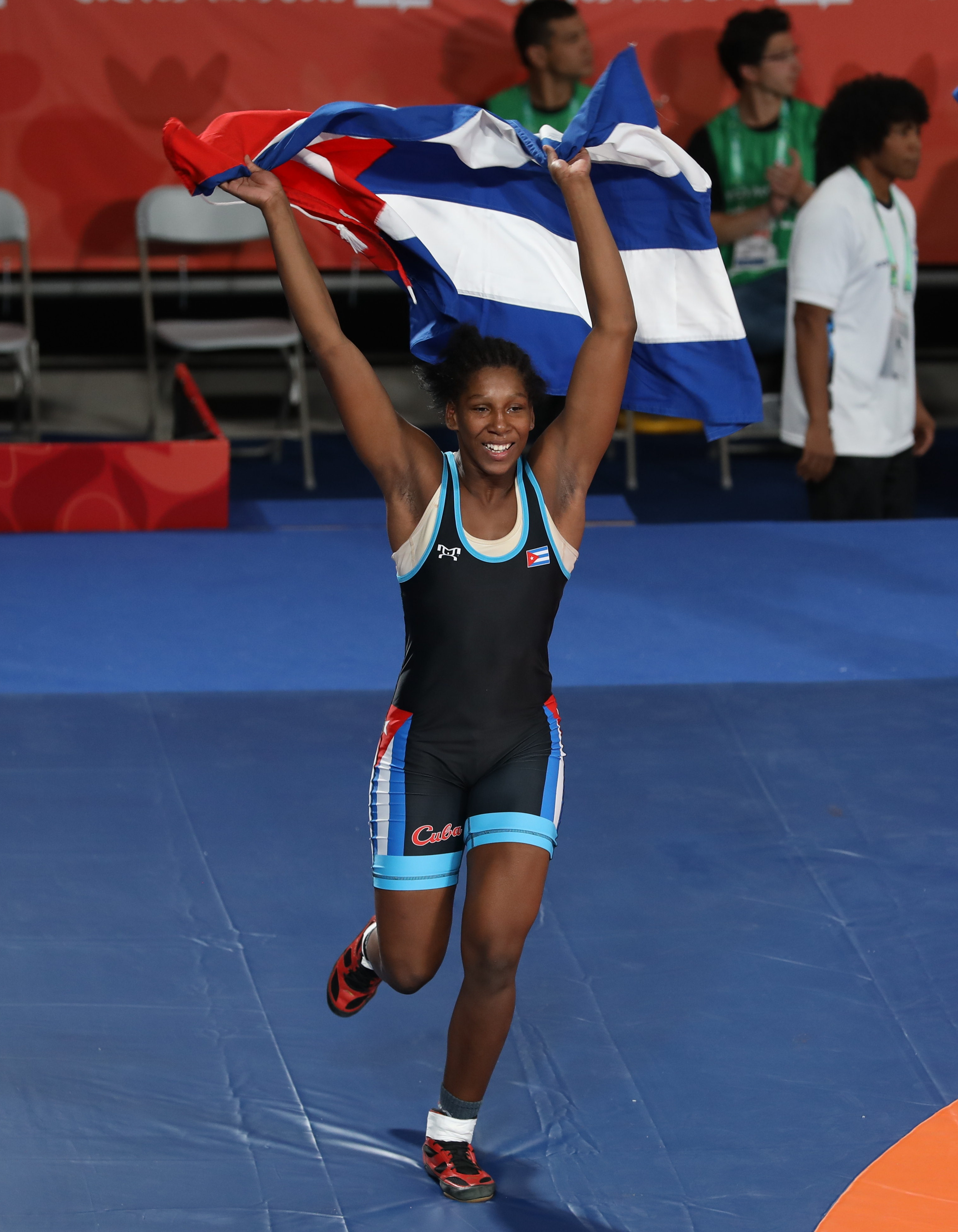
- Marín at the 2018 Summer Youth Olympics

Personal information
- Full name: Milaimys de la Caridad Marín Potrille
- Born: 16 March 2001 (age 25) Havana, Cuba

Sport
- Country: Cuba
- Sport: Amateur wrestling
- Weight class: 76 kg
- Event: Freestyle
Medal record
Women's freestyle wrestling
Representing Cuba
Olympic Games
Bronze medal – third place	2024 Paris	76 kg
World Championships
Bronze medal – third place	2025 Zagreb	76 kg
Pan American Games
Gold medal – first place	2023 Santiago	76 kg
Pan American Championships
Gold medal – first place	2023 Buenos Aires	76 kg
Bronze medal – third place	2025 Monterrey	76 kg
Bronze medal – third place	2026 Coralville	76 kg
Central American and Caribbean Games
Gold medal – first place	2026 Santo Domingo	76 kg
Bronze medal – third place	2023 San Salvador	76 kg
World U23 Championships
Gold medal – first place	2019 Budapest	72 kg
Junior Pan American Games
Gold medal – first place	2021 Cali	76 kg
Youth Olympic Games
Gold medal – first place	2018 Buenos Aires	73 kg

Milaimys de la Caridad Marín Potrille (Note: In this Spanish name, the first or paternal surname is Marín and the second or maternal family name is Potrille.) (born 16 March 2001) is a Cuban freestyle wrestler. She won one of the bronze medals in the women's 76 kg event at the 2024 Summer Olympics in Paris, France. She won the gold medal in the women's 76 kg event at the 2023 Pan American Games held in Santiago, Chile. She won the gold medal in the girls' freestyle 73 kg event at the 2018 Summer Youth Olympics held in Buenos Aires, Argentina.

Marín also won the gold medal in the women's 76 kg event at the 2021 Junior Pan American Games held in Cali, Colombia.

== Career ==
In 2019, Marín was eliminated in her first match in the women's freestyle 76 kg event at the World Wrestling Championships held in Nur-Sultan, Kazakhstan. At the 2019 World U23 Wrestling Championship held in Budapest, Hungary, she won the gold medal in the 72 kg event. She defeated Wang Xiaoqian of China in her gold medal match.

In 2020, Marín competed at the Pan American Olympic Qualification Tournament without qualifying for the 2020 Summer Olympics in Tokyo, Japan. She also failed to qualify for the Olympics at the 2021 World Olympic Qualification Tournament held in Sofia, Bulgaria.

Marín won the gold medal in the women's 76 kg event at the 2021 Junior Pan American Games held in Cali, Colombia. As a result, she directly qualified to compete in the women's 76 kg event at the 2023 Pan American Games in Santiago, Chile.

She competed in the women's 76 kg event at the 2022 World Wrestling Championships held in Belgrade, Serbia. She won her first match and she was then eliminated by Anastasiia Shustova of Ukraine.

Marín won one of the bronze medals in women's 76 kg event at the 2023 Central American and Caribbean Games held in San Salvador, El Salvador. In September 2023, she lost her bronze medal match in the women's 76 kg event at the 2023 World Wrestling Championships held in Belgrade, Serbia. Marín won a separate match against Cătălina Axente of Romania and she earned a quota place for Cuba for the 2024 Summer Olympics in Paris, France.

In November 2023, Marín won the gold medal in the women's 76 kg event at the Pan American Games held in Santiago, Chile. She defeated Tatiana Rentería of Colombia in her gold medal match.

Marín won one of the bronze medals in the women's 76 kg event at the 2024 Summer Olympics. She defeated Aiperi Medet Kyzy of Kyrgyzstan in her bronze medal match. Marín won one of the bronze medals in the women's 76 kg event at the 2025 World Wrestling Championships held in Zagreb, Croatia.

== Achievements ==
Year	Tournament	Location	Result	Event
2023	Pan American Wrestling Championships	Buenos Aires, Argentina	1st	Freestyle 76 kg
2023	Central American and Caribbean Games	San Salvador, El Salvador	3rd	Freestyle 76 kg
2023	Pan American Games	Santiago, Chile	1st	Freestyle 76 kg
2024	Olympic Games	Paris, France	3rd	Freestyle 76 kg
2025	Pan American Wrestling Championships	Monterrey, Mexico	3rd	Freestyle 76 kg
2025	World Championships	Zagreb, Croatia	3rd	Freestyle 76 kg
2026	Central American and Caribbean Games	Santo Domingo, Dominican Republic	1st	Freestyle 76 kg
2026	Pan American Wrestling Championships	Coralville, United States	3rd	Freestyle 76 kg
