= Brian Arregui =

Argentine boxer (born 2000)

Personal information
- Born: 15 January 2000 (age 26) Villaguay, Entre Ríos, Argentina, Argentina

Sport
- Sport: Boxing

Brian Agustin Arregui (born 15 January 2000) is an Argentine boxer. He competed in the men's welterweight event at the 2020 Summer Olympics.

== Professional boxing record ==
2 fights	2 wins	0 losses
By knockout	2	0
By decision	0	0

No.	Result	Record	Opponent	Type	Round, time	Date	Location	Notes
2	Win	2–0	(Argentina) Ernesto Jose Prebisch	KO	4 (6)	9 Apr 2021	Estadio Mary Terán de Weiss, Buenos Aires, Argentina	
1	Win	1–0	(Argentina) Maximiliano Jesus Recalde	TKO	2 (6)	11 Dec 2020	Estadio Mary Terán de Weiss, Buenos Aires, Argentina	
