= Linda Machuca =

Argentine freestyle wrestler

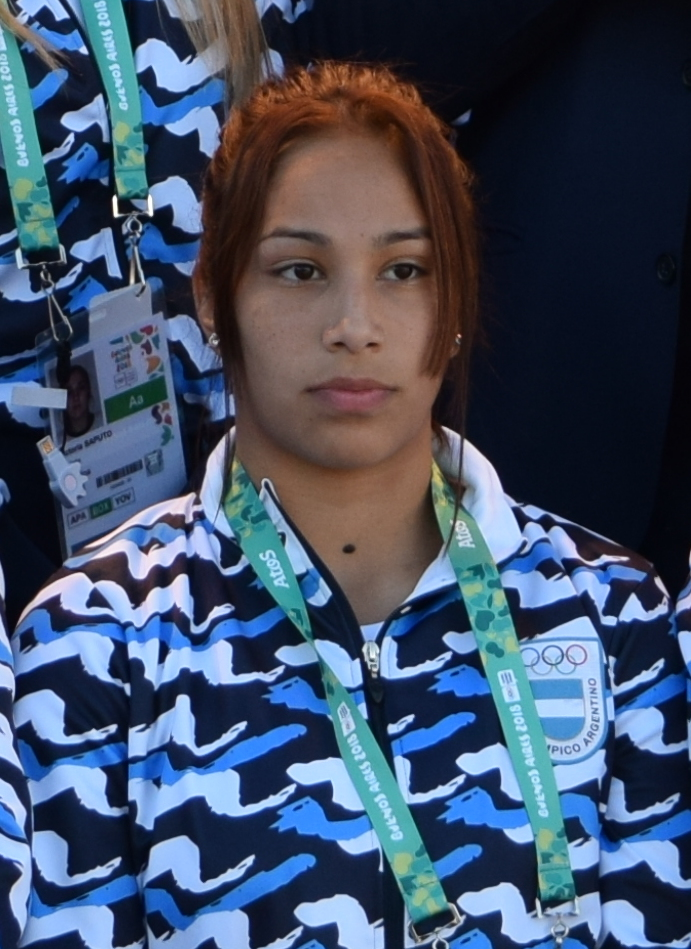
- Linda Machuca in 2018

Personal information
- Full name: Linda Marilina Machuca
- Born: 1 April 2001 (age 25)

Sport
- Country: Argentina
- Sport: Amateur wrestling
- Weight class: 76 kg
- Event: Freestyle
Medal record
Women's freestyle wrestling
Representing Argentina
Pan American Championships
Bronze medal – third place	2019 Buenos Aires	72 kg
Bronze medal – third place	2024 Acapulco	76 kg
Junior Pan American Games
Silver medal – second place	2021 Cali-Valle	76 kg
Youth Olympic Games
Silver medal – second place	2018 Buenos Aires	73 kg

Linda Marilina Machuca (born 1 April 2001) is an Argentine freestyle wrestler. She is a two-time bronze medalist at the Pan American Wrestling Championships. She won the silver medal in the girls' freestyle 73 kg event at the 2018 Summer Youth Olympics held in Buenos Aires, Argentina.

== Career ==
At the 2019 Pan American Wrestling Championships, held in Buenos Aires, Argentina, Machuca won the bronze medal in the women's 72 kg event. She won the silver medal in the women's 76 kg event at the 2021 Junior Pan American Games held in Cali, Colombia.

In 2023, Machuca competed in the women's 76 kg event at the Pan American Wrestling Championships held in Buenos Aires, Argentina. A few months later, she competed in her event at the 2023 Pan American Games held in Santiago, Chile. She lost her first match and she was then eliminated in the repechage.

Machuca won one of the bronze medals in her event at the 2024 Pan American Wrestling Championships held in Acapulco, Mexico. She competed at the 2024 Pan American Wrestling Olympic Qualification Tournament held in Acapulco, Mexico hoping to qualify for the 2024 Summer Olympics in Paris, France. She was eliminated in her second match by Justina Di Stasio of Canada.

== Achievements ==
Year	Tournament	Location	Result	Event
2019	Pan American Wrestling Championships	Buenos Aires, Argentina	3rd	Freestyle 72 kg
2024	Pan American Wrestling Championships	Acapulco, Mexico	3rd	Freestyle 76 kg
