= 2022 Dan Kolov & Nikola Petrov Tournament =

Dan Kolov & Nikola Petrov 2022
- Host city: Veliko Tarnovo, Bulgaria
- Dates: 17–20 February
- Stadium: Palace of Culture and Sports Vassil Levski

Champions
- Freestyle: Belarus
- Greco-Roman: Georgia
- Women: Bulgaria

The 59th Dan Kolov & Nikola Petrov Tournament was wrestling event held in Veliko Tarnovo, Bulgaria between 17 and 20 February 2022.

This international tournament included competition in both men's and women's freestyle wrestling and men's Greco-Roman wrestling. This tournament was held in honor of Dan Kolov who was the first European freestyle wrestling champion from Bulgaria and European and World Champion Nikola Petroff.

== Event videos ==
The event aired freely on the Bulgarian Wrestling Federation Live Youtube channel.

Broadcast
17 February 2022-Qualification Mat A	17 February 2022-Qualification Mat B	17 February 2022-Qualification Mat C
18 February 2022-Qualification/Finals Mat A	18 February 2022-Qualification/Finals Mat B	18 February 2022-Qualification/Finals Mat C
19 February 2022-Qualification/Finals Mat A	19 February 2022-Qualification/Finals Mat B	19 February 2022-Qualification/Finals Mat C
20 February 2022-Repechages/Finals Mat A	20 February 2022-Repechages/Finals Mat B	20 February 2022-Repechages/Finals Mat C

== Competition schedule ==
All times are (UTC+2)

Date	Time	Event
17 February	10:30–14:30	Elimination rounds: FS - 61,70,79,92 kg ; GR - 55,63,72,82 kg; WW - 55,59,65, 72 kg
17 February	17:00	Opening ceremony and Semi-finals: FS - 61,70,79, 92 kg; GR - 55,63,72,82 kg; WW - 55,59,65, 72 kg
18 February	10:30–14:30	Elimination rounds: FS - 57, 65, 74; GR - 87, 97, 130; WW - 62, 68, 76 kg; Repechages FS - 61,70,79, 92 kg; GR - 55,63,72,82 kg; WW - 55,59,65, 72 kg
18 February	17:00	Semi-finals: FS - 57, 65, 74; GR - 87, 97, 130; WW - 62, 68, 76 kg
18 February	18:00	Final matches and awarding ceremony: FS - 61,70,79, 92 kg; GR - 55,63,72,82 kg; WW - 55,59,65, 72 kg
19 February	10:30–14:30	Elimination rounds: FS - 86, 97, 125; GR - 60, 67, 77 kg; WW - 50, 53, 57 kg; Repechages FS - 57, 65, 74; GR - 87, 97, 130; WW - 62, 68, 76 kg
19 February	17:00	Semi-finals: FS - 86, 97, 125; GR - 60, 67, 77 kg; WW - 50, 53, 57 kg
19 February	18:00	Final matches and awarding ceremony: FS - 57, 65, 74; GR - 87, 97, 130; WW - 62, 68, 76 kg
20 February	11:00–12:00	Repechages: FS - 86, 97, 125; GR - 60, 67, 77 kg; WW - 50, 53, 57 kg
20 February	12:00	Final matches and awarding ceremony: FS - 86, 97, 125; GR - 60, 67, 77 kg; WW - 50, 53, 57 kg

== Medal table ==
Rank	Nation	Gold	Silver	Bronze	Total
1	Bulgaria	8	3	7	18
2	Belarus	5	0	5	10
3	Azerbaijan	3	1	5	9
4	Iran	2	1	4	7
5	United States	2	1	3	6
6	Romania	2	1	1	4
7	Albania	2	0	0	2
8	India	1	9	6	16
9	Georgia	1	5	7	13
10	Serbia	1	1	0	2
11	Kyrgyzstan	1	0	6	7
12	Moldova	1	0	2	3
13	Greece	1	0	0	1
14	Hungary	0	2	5	7
15	Germany	0	2	1	3
16	France	0	1	2	3
17	Finland	0	1	0	1
17	Sweden	0	1	0	1
17	Switzerland	0	1	0	1
20	Algeria	0	0	1	1
20	Norway	0	0	1	1
20	Ukraine	0	0	1	1
Totals (22 entries)		30	30	57	117

== Team ranking ==
Rank	Men's freestyle		Men's Greco-Roman		Women's freestyle	
Rank	Team	Points	Team	Points	Team	Points
1	Belarus	138	Georgia	148	Bulgaria	188
2	India	128	Bulgaria	112	India	162
3	Azerbaijan	120	Kyrgyzstan	110	France	70
4	Georgia	103	Hungary	101	Belarus	64
5	Bulgaria	83	Serbia	84	Romania	63
6	United States	75	Iran	80	Germany	61
7	Iran	70	India	67	Hungary	59
8	Moldova	57	Romania	55	United States	52
9	Albania	50	Belarus	52	Moldova	42
10	Ukraine	43	Algeria	43	Greece	35

== Medal overview ==
=== Men's freestyle ===
Event	Gold	Silver	Bronze
57 kg	Aryan Tsiutryn; Belarus	Aman Sehrawat; India	Aliabbas Rzazade; Azerbaijan
57 kg	Aryan Tsiutryn; Belarus	Aman Sehrawat; India	Roberti Dingashvili; Georgia
61 kg	Zelimkhan Abakarov; Albania	Ravi Kumar Dahiya; India	Georgi Vangelov; Bulgaria
61 kg	Zelimkhan Abakarov; Albania	Ravi Kumar Dahiya; India	Josh Rodriguez; United States
65 kg	Islam Dudaev; Albania	Kumar Anuj; India	Pat Lugo; United States
65 kg	Islam Dudaev; Albania	Kumar Anuj; India	Niurgun Skriabin; Belarus
70 kg	Zain Retherford; United States	Ramazan Ramazanov; Bulgaria	Ivan Stoyanov; Bulgaria
70 kg	Zain Retherford; United States	Ramazan Ramazanov; Bulgaria	Gia Avaliani; Georgia
74 kg	Dzhabrail Gadzhiyev; Azerbaijan	Turan Bayramov; Azerbaijan	Murad Kuramagomedov; Hungary
74 kg	Dzhabrail Gadzhiyev; Azerbaijan	Turan Bayramov; Azerbaijan	Dimitri Jioevi; Georgia
79 kg	Ali Shabanau; Belarus	Gourav Baliyan; India	Valentyn Babii; Ukraine
79 kg	Ali Shabanau; Belarus	Gourav Baliyan; India	Mostafa Ghiasi; Iran
86 kg	Abubakr Abakarov; Azerbaijan	Sandro Aminashvili; Georgia	Sanjeet Kundu; India
86 kg	Abubakr Abakarov; Azerbaijan	Sandro Aminashvili; Georgia	Orkhan Abasov; Azerbaijan
92 kg	Adlan Tasuyeu; Belarus	Akhmed Bataev; Bulgaria	Osman Nurmagomedov; Azerbaijan
92 kg	Adlan Tasuyeu; Belarus	Akhmed Bataev; Bulgaria	Deepak Punia; India
97 kg	Magomedkhan Magomedov; Azerbaijan	Meysam Abdi; Iran	Aliaksandr Hushtyn; Belarus
97 kg	Magomedkhan Magomedov; Azerbaijan	Meysam Abdi; Iran	Radu Lefter; Moldova
125 kg	Dzianis Khramiankou; Belarus	Jere Heino; Finland	Yadollah Mohebbi; Iran
125 kg	Dzianis Khramiankou; Belarus	Jere Heino; Finland	Rahid Hamidli; Azerbaijan

=== Greco-Roman ===
Event	Gold	Silver	Bronze
55 kg	Balbai Dordokov; Kyrgyzstan	Denis Mihai; Romania	Ajay; India
55 kg	Balbai Dordokov; Kyrgyzstan	Denis Mihai; Romania	Denis Demirov; Bulgaria
60 kg	Saeid Esmaeili; Iran	Irakli Dzimistarishvili; Georgia	Abdelkarim Fergat; Algeria
60 kg	Saeid Esmaeili; Iran	Irakli Dzimistarishvili; Georgia	Zholaman Sharshenbekov; Kyrgyzstan
63 kg	Meysam Dalkhani; Iran	Pridon Abuladze; Georgia	Tynar Sharshenbekov; Kyrgyzstan
63 kg	Meysam Dalkhani; Iran	Pridon Abuladze; Georgia	Erik Torba; Hungary
67 kg	Ivo Iliev; Bulgaria	Sebastian Nađ; Serbia	Eldiiar Satarov; Kyrgyzstan
67 kg	Ivo Iliev; Bulgaria	Sebastian Nađ; Serbia	Marlen Asikeev; Kyrgyzstan
72 kg	Ali Arsalan; Serbia	Róbert Fritsch; Hungary	Shmagi Bolkvadze; Georgia
72 kg	Ali Arsalan; Serbia	Róbert Fritsch; Hungary	Alireza Abdevali; Iran
77 kg	Aik Mnatsakanian; Bulgaria	Sajan Bhanwal; India	Akzhol Makhmudov; Kyrgyzstan
77 kg	Aik Mnatsakanian; Bulgaria	Sajan Bhanwal; India	Pavel Liakh; Belarus
82 kg	Gela Bolkvadze; Georgia	Tamás Lévai; Hungary	Alireza Mohmadi; Iran
82 kg	Gela Bolkvadze; Georgia	Tamás Lévai; Hungary	Tornike Dzamashvili; Georgia
87 kg	Kiryl Maskevich; Belarus	Robert Kobliashvili; Georgia	István Takács; Hungary
87 kg	Kiryl Maskevich; Belarus	Robert Kobliashvili; Georgia	Gurami Khetsuriani; Georgia
97 kg	Kiril Milov; Bulgaria	Revaz Nadareishvili; Georgia	Uzur Dzhuzupbekov; Kyrgyzstan
97 kg	Kiril Milov; Bulgaria	Revaz Nadareishvili; Georgia	Giorgi Katsanashvili; Georgia
130 kg	Alin Alexuc-Ciurariu; Romania	Delian Alishahi; Switzerland	Dáriusz Vitek; Hungary
130 kg	Alin Alexuc-Ciurariu; Romania	Delian Alishahi; Switzerland	Lenard Berei; Romania

=== Women's freestyle ===
Event	Gold	Silver	Bronze
50 kg	Miglena Selishka; Bulgaria	Neelam Sirohi; India	Emilia Cîrîcu; Moldova
50 kg	Miglena Selishka; Bulgaria	Neelam Sirohi; India	Julie Sabatié; France
53 kg	Maria Prevolaraki; Greece	Nova Bergman; Sweden	Tatiana Debien; France
53 kg	Maria Prevolaraki; Greece	Nova Bergman; Sweden	Anastasia Blayvas; Germany
55 kg	Andreea Ana; Romania	Pinki; India	Sezen Belberova; Bulgaria
57 kg	Evelina Nikolova; Bulgaria	Srishti Srishti; India	Anna Szél; Hungary
57 kg	Evelina Nikolova; Bulgaria	Srishti Srishti; India	Alesia Hetmanava; Belarus
59 kg	Sanju Devi; India	Andrea Grasruck; Germany	Nadzeya Bulanaya; Belarus
62 kg	Bilyana Dudova; Bulgaria	Taybe Yusein; Bulgaria	Radhika Jaglan; India
62 kg	Bilyana Dudova; Bulgaria	Taybe Yusein; Bulgaria	Jennifer Rogers; United States
65 kg	Emma Bruntil; United States	Mallory Velte; United States	Elis Manolova; Azerbaijan
65 kg	Emma Bruntil; United States	Mallory Velte; United States	Sofia Georgieva; Bulgaria
68 kg	Irina Rîngaci; Moldova	Pauline Lecarpentier; France	Sonika Hooda; India
68 kg	Irina Rîngaci; Moldova	Pauline Lecarpentier; France	Siyka Ivanova; Bulgaria
72 kg	Yuliana Yaneva; Bulgaria	Lilly Schneider; Germany	Reetika Hooda; India
72 kg	Yuliana Yaneva; Bulgaria	Lilly Schneider; Germany	Daniela Brasnarova; Bulgaria
76 kg	Mariya Oryashkova; Bulgaria	Kavita Kavita; India	Marion Bye; Norway

== Participating nations ==
447 competitors from 35 nations participated.

- Albania (3)
- Algeria (16)
- Australia (1)
- Austria (3)
- Azerbaijan (13)
- Belarus (23)
- Brazil (2)
- Bulgaria (63)
- Denmark (2)
- Spain (13)
- Estonia (2)
- Finland (3)
- France (7)
- Georgia (46)
- Germany (4)
- Greece (5)
- Honduras (4)
- Hungary (35)
- India (60)
- Iran (13)
- Kazakhstan (2)
- Kyrgyzstan (15)
- Moldova (20)
- North Macedonia (11)
- Netherlands (2)
- Norway (3)
- Portugal (1)
- Romania (14)
- Russia (2)
- Serbia (13)
- Switzerland (16)
- Sweden (3)
- Tajikistan (1)
- Ukraine (8)
- United States (18)

== Results ==
Legend

- F — Won by fall
- R — Retired
- WO — Won by walkover

=== Men's freestyle ===
==== Men's freestyle 57 kg ====
Round of 32
	Score	
Demian Liutcanov (MDA)	1–13	Aryan Tsiutryn (BLR)
Thomas Epp (SUI)	0–10	Roberti Dingashvili (GEO)

Round of 16
Aliabbas Rzazade (AZE)	10
Ivaylo Tisov (BUL)	0
Aryan Tsiutryn (BLR)	5
Goga Dzigua (GEO)	1
Thomas Fischer (SUI)	0
Aid Salihasi (MKD)	10
Nico Provo (USA)	8
Bajrang Jyotiba (IND)	6
Afgan Khashalov (AZE)	4^{F}
Arun (IND)	0
Reza Momeni (IRI)	7
Salaheddine Kateb (ALG)	0
Stefan Shtejrov (MKD)	0
Roberti Dingashvili (GEO)	10
Aman Sehrawat (IND)	10
Levan Metreveli (ESP)	2

Quarterfinals
Aliabbas Rzazade (AZE)	6
Aryan Tsiutryn (BLR)	8
Aid Salihasi (MKD)	0
Nico Provo (USA)	10
Afgan Khashalov (AZE)	10
Reza Momeni (IRI)	0
Roberti Dingashvili (GEO)	12
Aman Sehrawat (IND)	23

Semifinals
Aryan Tsiutryn (BLR)	13
Nico Provo (USA)	0
Afgan Khashalov (AZE)	4^{R}
Aman Sehrawat (IND)	6

Final
Aryan Tsiutryn (BLR)	18
Aman Sehrawat (IND)	9

Repechage round 1
Demian Liutcanov (MDA)	4
Goga Dzigua (GEO)	9

Repechage round 2
Goga Dzigua (GEO)	0
Aliabbas Rzazade (AZE)	8^{F}
Levan Metreveli (ESP)	1
Roberti Dingashvili (GEO)	3

Bronze medal match
Aliabbas Rzazade (AZE)	10
Nico Provo (USA)	0
Roberti Dingashvili (GEO)	WO
Afgan Khashalov (AZE)

==== Men's freestyle 61 kg ====
Round of 32
	Score	
Gabe Townsell (USA)	4–1 Ret	Intigam Valizada (AZE)
Otari Gogava (GEO)	8–5	Besir Alili (MKD)
Georgi Vangelov (BUL)	8–11	Ravi Kumar Dahiya (IND)
Nils Leutert (SUI)	0–4	Ravinder Singh (IND)
Dariush Hazratgholizadeh (IRI)	10–12	Leonid Colesnic (MDA)
Josh Rodriguez (USA)	2–5	Zelimkhan Abakarov (ALB)

Round of 16
Nino Leutert (SUI)	1
Pankaj Malik (IND)	6
Gabe Townsell (USA)	2
Georgii Okorokov (AUS)	7
Daviti Abdaladze (GEO)	2
Otari Gogava (GEO)	4
Ravi Kumar Dahiya (IND)	10
Akram Djerarda (ALG)	0
Sergey Bonev (BUL)	6
Ravinder Singh (IND)	13^{F}
Leonid Colesnic (MDA)	7
Ruhan Rasim (BUL)	2
Vicky Vicky (IND)	1
Zelimkhan Abakarov (ALB)	11
Andrei Bekreneu (BLR)	4
Giorgi Goniashvili (GEO)	3

Quarterfinals
Pankaj Malik (IND)	8
Georgii Okorokov (AUS)	2
Otari Gogava (GEO)	0
Ravi Kumar Dahiya (IND)	10
Ravinder Singh (IND)	11
Leonid Colesnic (MDA)	4^{R}
Zelimkhan Abakarov (ALB)	3
Andrei Bekreneu (BLR)	1

Semifinals
Pankaj Malik (IND)	0
Ravi Kumar Dahiya (IND)	5
Ravinder Singh (IND)	0
Zelimkhan Abakarov (ALB)	11

Final
Ravi Kumar Dahiya (IND)	1
Zelimkhan Abakarov (ALB)	7

Repechage round 1
Georgi Vangelov (BUL)	10
Akram Djerarda (ALG)	0
Josh Rodriguez (USA)	13
Vicky Vicky (IND)	3

Repechage round 2
Georgi Vangelov (BUL)	5
Otari Gogava (GEO)	0^{R}
Josh Rodriguez (USA)	4
Andrei Bekreneu (BLR)	1

Bronze medal match
Georgi Vangelov (BUL)	3
Pankaj Malik (IND)	1
Josh Rodriguez (USA)	10
Ravinder Singh (IND)	8

==== Men's freestyle 65 kg ====
Round of 32
	Score	
Muhamed Feruki (MKD)	1–2	Ivan Badavrov (BUL)

Round of 16
Said Hosseini (FIN)	1
Vitalie Bunici (MDA)	6^{F}
Ivan Badavrov (BUL)	4
Dominik Laritz (SUI)	8
Ștefan Tonu (MDA)	3
Pat Lugo (USA)	5
Islam Dudaev (ALB)	6
Aikhaan Antonov (RUS)	0
Anuj Kumar (IND)	10
Carlos Álvarez (ESP)	0
Maxim Saculțan (MDA)	3
Vladimir Dubov (BUL)	0
Niurgun Skriabin (BLR)	10
Károly Kiss (HUN)	0
Stilyan Iliev (BUL)	10
Chouaib Sahraoui (ALG)	0

Quarterfinals
Vitalie Bunici (MDA)	11
Dominik Laritz (SUI)	0
Pat Lugo (USA)	0
Islam Dudaev (ALB)	10
Anuj Kumar (IND)	11
Maxim Saculțan (MDA)	4
Niurgun Skriabin (BLR)	10
Stilyan Iliev (BUL)	0

Semifinals
Vitalie Bunici (MDA)	0
Islam Dudaev (ALB)	10
Anuj Kumar (IND)	16
Niurgun Skriabin (BLR)	8

Final
Islam Dudaev (ALB)	6
Anuj Kumar (IND)	5

Repechage round 2
Aikhaan Antonov (RUS)	2
Pat Lugo (USA)	12
Carlos Álvarez (ESP)	0^{R}
Maxim Saculțan (MDA)	8

Bronze medal match
Pat Lugo (USA)	5
Vitalie Bunici (MDA)	3
Maxim Saculțan (MDA)	0
Niurgun Skriabin (BLR)	3

==== Men's freestyle 70 kg ====
Round of 32
	Score	
Valentin Borzin (MDA)	4–8	Jaideep (IND)

Round of 16
Yehor Muradyan (UKR)	12
Benedikt Huber (AUT)	1
Jaideep (IND)	4
Akaki Kemertelidze (GEO)	3
Ivan Stoyanov (BUL)	0
Zain Retherford (USA)	8
Arsim Bekirovski (ALB)	0
Marc Dietsche (SUI)	11
Veselin Petrov (BUL)	1
Ramazan Ramazanov (BUL)	11
Fati Vejseli (MKD)	1
Yousef Kamrani (IRI)	7
Nicolai Grahmez (MDA)	8
Dániel Antal (HUN)	4
Gia Avaliani (GEO)	9
Tobias Portmann (SUI)	6

Quarterfinals
Yehor Muradyan (UKR)	WO
Jaideep (IND)
Zain Retherford (USA)	12
Marc Dietsche (SUI)	2
Ramazan Ramazanov (BUL)	12
Yousef Kamrani (IRI)	1
Nicolai Grahmez (MDA)	3
Gia Avaliani (GEO)	9

Semifinals
Yehor Muradyan (UKR)	0
Zain Retherford (USA)	4^{F}
Ramazan Ramazanov (BUL)	10
Gia Avaliani (GEO)	0

Final
Zain Retherford (USA)	10
Ramazan Ramazanov (BUL)	6

Repechage round 2
Ivan Stoyanov (BUL)	13
Marc Dietsche (SUI)	7
Veselin Petrov (BUL)	0
Yousef Kamrani (IRI)	7

Bronze medal match
Ivan Stoyanov (BUL)	11
Yehor Muradyan (UKR)	1
Yousef Kamrani (IRI)	3
Gia Avaliani (GEO)	6

==== Men's freestyle 74 kg ====
Round of 32
	Score	
Turan Bayramov (AZE)	3–0	Mihail Georgiev (BUL)
Stefan Dimitrov (MKD)	0–11	Tymur Hudyma (UKR)
Murad Kuramagomedov (HUN)	10–0	Umar Mavlaev (SUI)
Vasile Diacon (MDA)	4–9	Dimitri Jioevi (GEO)
Aimar Andruse (EST)	2–12	Dimitar Angelov (BUL)

Round of 16
Yoan Georgiev (BUL)	2
Abdelkader Ikkal (ALG)	12
Turan Bayramov (AZE)	12^{F}
Aykan Seid (BUL)	0
Sagar Jaglan (IND)	2
Tymur Hudyma (UKR)	7^{F}
Murad Kuramagomedov (HUN)	10
Preet Singh (IND)	0
Dzhabrail Gadzhiev (AZE)	8^{F}
Zhaksylyk Sultan (KAZ)	8
Dimitri Jioevi (GEO)	3
Azamat Nurykau (BLR)	1
Yahor Akulich (BLR)	15
Dimitar Angelov (BUL)	5
Ali-Pasha Umarpashaev (BUL)	12
Oleksandr Stafiichuk (UKR)	0

Quarterfinals
Abdelkader Ikkal (ALG)	0
Turan Bayramov (AZE)	6
Tymur Hudyma (UKR)	2
Murad Kuramagomedov (HUN)	8
Dzhabrail Gadzhiev (AZE)	12
Dimitri Jioevi (GEO)	1
Yahor Akulich (BLR)	4
Ali-Pasha Umarpashaev (BUL)	11

Semifinals
Turan Bayramov (AZE)	1
Murad Kuramagomedov (HUN)	1
Dzhabrail Gadzhiev (AZE)	8
Ali-Pasha Umarpashaev (BUL)	3

Final
Turan Bayramov (AZE)	1
Dzhabrail Gadzhiev (AZE)	3

Repechage round 1
Mihail Georgiev (BUL)	12
Aykan Seid (BUL)	0

Repechage round 2
Mihail Georgiev (BUL)	4
Abdelkader Ikkal (ALG)	0
Zhaksylyk Sultan (KAZ)	6
Dimitri Jioevi (GEO)	16

Bronze medal match
Mihail Georgiev (BUL)	2
Murad Kuramagomedov (HUN)	12
Dimitri Jioevi (GEO)	9
Ali-Pasha Umarpashaev (BUL)	8

==== Men's freestyle 79 kg ====
Round of 32
	Score	
Gourav Baliyan (IND)	11–0	Behar Mamuti (MKD)
Oktay Hasan (BUL)	0–12	Mostafa Ghiasi (IRI)
Dzhemal Ali (BUL)	1–4	Temuri Beruashvili (GEO)

Round of 16
Pardeep (IND)	4
Deepak Nehra (IND)	7
Gourav Baliyan (IND)	11
Shuhrat Bozorov (TJK)	4
Csaba Vida (HUN)	4
Stanislav Novac (MDA)	0^{R}
Grigorii Carastoian (MDA)	2
Valentyn Babii (UKR)	5
German Ustinov (RUS)	12
Simon Marchl (AUT)	7
Mostafa Ghiasi (IRI)	11
Rustem Myrzagaliyev (KAZ)	0
Ashraf Ashirov (AZE)	3
Temuri Beruashvili (GEO)	3
Erik Reinbok (EST)	0
Ali Shabanau (BLR)	10

Quarterfinals
Deepak Nehra (IND)	8
Gourav Baliyan (IND)	9
Csaba Vida (HUN)	14
Valentyn Babii (UKR)	11^{F}
German Ustinov (RUS)	0
Mostafa Ghiasi (IRI)	7^{C}
Ashraf Ashirov (AZE)	0
Ali Shabanau (BLR)	5

Semifinals
Gourav Baliyan (IND)	13
Valentyn Babii (UKR)	6
Mostafa Ghiasi (IRI)	2
Ali Shabanau (BLR)	4

Final
Gourav Baliyan (IND)	1
Ali Shabanau (BLR)	12

Repechage round 1
Behar Mamuti (MKD)	0
Shuhrat Bozorov (TJK)	6

Repechage round 2
Shuhrat Bozorov (TJK)	1
Deepak Nehra (IND)	3
Erik Reinbok (EST)	WO
Ashraf Ashirov (AZE)

Bronze medal match
Deepak Nehra (IND)	0
Valentyn Babii (UKR)	7^{F}
Erik Reinbok (EST)	0
Mostafa Ghiasi (IRI)	11

==== Men's freestyle 86 kg ====
Round of 32
	Score	
Andrian Grosul (MDA)	0–7	Akhmed Magamaev (BUL)
Ivan Ichizli (MDA)	6–2	Anatolii Chervonenko (UKR)
Goga Mamiauri (GEO)	1–7	Abubakr Abakarov (AZE)
Hajy Rajabau (BLR)	2–7	Zaur Beradze (GEO)
Sandro Aminashvili (GEO)	9–6	Evelin Rusev (BUL)
Sandeep Singh Mann (IND)	11–0	Hristo Georgiev (BUL)
Mohsen Mostafavi (IRI)	6–0	Damian Iglesias (ESP)
Denis Balaur (MDA)	9–8	Pawan Dahiya (IND)

Round of 16
Sanjeet Sanjeet (IND)	3
Akhmed Magamaev (BUL)	10^{R}
Ivan Ichizli (MDA)	12
Zhulien Ivanov (BUL)	2
Fateh Benferdjallah (ALG)	0
Abubakr Abakarov (AZE)	10
Zaur Beradze (GEO)	WO
~~Anton Ivanov (BUL)~~
Orkhan Abasov (AZE)	7
Sandro Aminashvili (GEO)	9
Sandeep Singh Mann (IND)	9
Milán Mester (HUN)	8
Lilian Balan (MDA)	2
Mohsen Mostafavi (IRI)	7
Denis Balaur (MDA)	7
Vladyslav Prus (UKR)	0

Quarterfinals
Sanjeet Sanjeet (IND)	6
Ivan Ichizli (MDA)	3
Abubakr Abakarov (AZE)	4
Zaur Beradze (GEO)	3
Sandro Aminashvili (GEO)	3
Sandeep Singh Mann (IND)	0
Mohsen Mostafavi (IRI)	2
Denis Balaur (MDA)	5

Semifinals
Sanjeet Sanjeet (IND)	4
Abubakr Abakarov (AZE)	8
Sandro Aminashvili (GEO)	4
Denis Balaur (MDA)	3

Final
Abubakr Abakarov (AZE)	7
Sandro Aminashvili (GEO)	0

Repechage round 1
Goga Mamiauri (GEO)
Fateh Benferdjallah (ALG)	WO
Evelin Rusev (BUL)	0
Orkhan Abasov (AZE)	11

Repechage round 2
Fateh Benferdjallah (ALG)	0
Zaur Beradze (GEO)	6^{F}
Orkhan Abasov (AZE)	7
Sandeep Singh Mann (IND)	6

Bronze medal match
Zaur Beradze (GEO)	0
Sanjeet Sanjeet (IND)	4
Orkhan Abasov (AZE)	9
Denis Balaur (MDA)	3

==== Men's freestyle 92 kg ====
Round of 16
Adlan Tasuyeu (BLR)	6
Parveen Kumar (IND)	0
Beka Tcheldize (GEO)	10
Guradeshwar Singh (IND)	0
Irakli Mtsituri (GEO)	2
Deepak Punia (IND)	6^{F}
Ilia Hristov (BUL)	2
Osman Nurmagomedov (AZE)	13
Mykyta Lovin (UKR)	2
Redjep Hajdari (MKD)	7

Quarterfinals
Benjamin Greil (AUT)	0
Adlan Tasuyeu (BLR)	11
Beka Tcheldize (GEO)	1
Deepak Punia (IND)	13
Mehdi Hajiloueian (IRI)	2
Osman Nurmagomedov (AZE)	9
Redjep Hajdari (MKD)	1
Akhmed Bataev (BUL)	14

Semifinals
Adlan Tasuyeu (BLR)	3
Deepak Punia (IND)	1
Osman Nurmagomedov (AZE)	4
Akhmed Bataev (BUL)	6

Final
Adlan Tasuyeu (BLR)	4
Akhmed Bataev (BUL)	3

Repechage round 1
Parveen Kumar (IND)	7
Benjamin Greil (AUT)	6

Bronze medal match
Parveen Kumar (IND)	0
Deepak Punia (IND)	9^{F}
Redjep Hajdari (MKD)	0
Osman Nurmagomedov (AZE)	10

==== Men's freestyle 97 kg ====
Round of 16
Aliaksandr Hushtyn (BLR)	10
Stole Eftimov (MKD)	0
Magomedkhan Magomedov (AZE)	11
Iuza Tsertsvadze (GEO)	2
Vasil Pauliuchenka (BLR)	12
Richard Végh (HUN)	1
Radu Lefter (MDA)	0
Meysam Abdi (IRI)	5
Sven Engström (SWE)	0
Tzvetan Evtimov (BUL)	6
Alejandro Cañada (ESP)	0
Sahil Una (IND)	2

Quarterfinals
Islam Ilyasov (AZE)	1
Aliaksandr Hushtyn (BLR)	4
Magomedkhan Magomedov (AZE)	15
Vasil Pauliuchenka (BLR)	4
Meysam Abdi (IRI)	10
Tzvetan Evtimov (BUL)	0
Sahil Una (IND)	5
Deepak (IND)	8

Semifinals
Aliaksandr Hushtyn (BLR)	1
Magomedkhan Magomedov (AZE)	5^{F}
Meysam Abdi (IRI)	6^{F}
Deepak (IND)	0

Final
Magomedkhan Magomedov (AZE)	6^{F}
Meysam Abdi (IRI)	0

Repechage round 1
Iuza Tsertsvadze (GEO)	18
Vasil Pauliuchenka (BLR)	7
Radu Lefter (MDA)	12
Tzvetan Evtimov (BUL)	2

Bronze medal match
Iuza Tsertsvadze (GEO)	2
Aliaksandr Hushtyn (BLR)	12^{C}
Radu Lefter (MDA)	WO
Deepak (IND)

==== Men's freestyle 125 kg ====
Round of 16
Egor Olar (MDA)	4
Oualid Bouazizi (ALG)	0^{R}
Yadollah Mohebbi (IRI)	3
Dzianis Khramiankou (BLR)	8
Artem Hashenko (UKR)	10
Uvejs Fejzulau (MKD)	0
Jere Heino (FIN)	10
Georgi Velev (BUL)	0
~~Milán Korcsog (HUN)~~
Solomon Manashvili (GEO)	WO
Islam Adizov (BUL)	3
Rahid Hamidli (AZE)	6

Quarterfinals
Ceron Francisco (USA)	2
Egor Olar (MDA)	0^{R}
Dzianis Khramiankou (BLR)	10
Artem Hashenko (UKR)	0
Jere Heino (FIN)	10
Solomon Manashvili (GEO)	6
Rahid Hamidli (AZE)	13
Georgi Ivanov (BUL)	0

Semifinals
Ceron Francisco (USA)	4
Dzianis Khramiankou (BLR)	7
Jere Heino (FIN)	5
Rahid Hamidli (AZE)	0

Final
Dzianis Khramiankou (BLR)	10
Jere Heino (FIN)	0

Repechage round 1
Yadollah Mohebbi (IRI)	8^{F}
Artem Hashenko (UKR)	2
Georgi Velev (BUL)	0
Solomon Manashvili (GEO)	10

Bronze medal match
Yadollah Mohebbi (IRI)	6
Ceron Francisco (USA)	0
Solomon Manashvili (GEO)
Rahid Hamidli (AZE)	WO

=== Men's Greco-Roman ===
==== Men's Greco-Roman 55 kg ====
Round of 16
Nugzari Tsurtsumia (GEO)	6
Ajay (IND)	7
Giorgi Tokhadze (GEO)	1
Denis Mihai (ROU)	9
Stefan Grigorov (BUL)	10
Juber (IND)	1

Quarterfinals
Balbai Dordokov (KGZ)	3
Ajay (IND)	2
Mohamed Yacine Dridi (ALG)	10
Seyed Arash Negahdari (IRI)	0
Denis Demirov (BUL)	2
Denis Mihai (ROU)	5
Stefan Grigorov (BUL)	2
Rupin Gahlawat (IND)	4

Semifinals
Balbai Dordokov (KGZ)	6
Mohamed Yacine Dridi (ALG)	4
Denis Mihai (ROU)	7
Rupin Gahlawat (IND)	3

Final
Balbai Dordokov (KGZ)	4^{F}
Denis Mihai (ROU)	2

Repechage round 1
Giorgi Tokhadze (GEO)	3
Denis Demirov (BUL)	12

Bronze medal match
Ajay (IND)	4
Mohamed Yacine Dridi (ALG)	1
Denis Demirov (BUL)	9
Rupin Gahlawat (IND)	0

==== Men's Greco-Roman 60 kg ====
Round of 16
Nurmukhammet Abdullaev (KGZ)	5
Dimitri Khachidze (GEO)	1
Abdelkarim Fergat (ALG)	10
Miroslav Emilov (BUL)	0
Nedyalko Petrov (BUL)	10
Gabe Townsell (USA)	0
Sumit (IND)	0
Zholaman Sharshenbekov (KGZ)	8
Saeid Esmaeili (IRI)	9
Abdeldjebar Djebbari (ALG)	0
Edmond Nazaryan (BUL)	11
József Andrási (HUN)	0

Quarterfinals
Irakli Dzimistarishvili (GEO)	8
Nurmukhammet Abdullaev (KGZ)	0
Abdelkarim Fergat (ALG)	6
Nedyalko Petrov (BUL)	2
Zholaman Sharshenbekov (KGZ)	1
Saeid Esmaeili (IRI)	6
Edmond Nazaryan (BUL)	11
Dimitar Sandov (SUI)	0

Semifinals
Irakli Dzimistarishvili (GEO)	8
Abdelkarim Fergat (ALG)	7
Saeid Esmaeili (IRI)	7
Edmond Nazaryan (BUL)	2

Final
Irakli Dzimistarishvili (GEO)
Saeid Esmaeili (IRI)	WO

Repechage round 1
Abdeldjebar Djebbari (ALG)	0
Zholaman Sharshenbekov (KGZ)	10

Bronze medal match
Nurmukhammet Abdullaev (KGZ)	0
Abdelkarim Fergat (ALG)	9
Zholaman Sharshenbekov (KGZ)	8
Edmond Nazaryan (BUL)	0

==== Men's Greco-Roman 63 kg ====
Round of 16
Tynar Sharshenbekov (KGZ)	3
Pridon Abuladze (GEO)	4
Vijay Vijay (IND)	5
Krisztián Kecskeméti (HUN)	9
Ilia Mustakov (BUL)	0
Chayse La Joie (USA)	8
Meisam Dalkhani (IRI)	9
Perica Dimitrijević (SRB)	0

Quarterfinals
~~Zelimkhan Abakarov (ALB)~~
Pridon Abuladze (GEO)	WO
Krisztián Kecskeméti (HUN)	4
Giorgi Shotadze (GEO)	0
Erik Torba (HUN)	12
Chayse La Joie (USA)	4
Meisam Dalkhani (IRI)	7
Ermek Kanybek Uulu (KGZ)	3

Semifinals
Pridon Abuladze (GEO)	2
Krisztián Kecskeméti (HUN)	1
Erik Torba (HUN)	6
Meisam Dalkhani (IRI)	7

Final
Pridon Abuladze (GEO)	3
Meisam Dalkhani (IRI)	4

Repechage round 1
Tynar Sharshenbekov (KGZ)	WO
~~Zelimkhan Abakarov (ALB)~~
Perica Dimitrijević (SRB)	8
Ermek Kanybek Uulu (KGZ)	9

Bronze medal match
Tynar Sharshenbekov (KGZ)	WO
~~Krisztián Kecskeméti (HUN)~~	DSQ
Ermek Kanybek Uulu (KGZ)	1
Erik Torba (HUN)	9

==== Men's Greco-Roman 67 kg ====
Round of 32
	Score	
Malkit Hooda (IND)	2–8	Ashu Bazard (IND)
Pedro Caldas (POR)	8–0	Igor Gavrilović (SRB)
Leri Abuladze (GEO)	9–1	Mihai Mihuț (ROU)
Marlen Asikeev (KGZ)	2–7	Sebastian Nađ (SRB)

Round of 16
Nestar Nestarov (BUL)	1
Aliaksandr Liavonchyk (BLR)	5
Ashu Bazard (IND)	7
Robert Perez III (USA)	0
Ivo Iliev (BUL)	12
Pedro Caldas (POR)	3
Eldiiar Satarov (KGZ)	9
Luka Ochigava (GEO)	0
Radoslav Dimitrov (BUL)	3
Ishak Ghaiou (ALG)	5^{F}
Leri Abuladze (GEO)	6
Andreas Vetsch (SUI)	3
Sachin Sahrawat (IND)	2
Sebastian Nađ (SRB)	5
~~István Váncza (HUN)~~
Mate Nemeš (SRB)	WO

Quarterfinals
Aliaksandr Liavonchyk (BLR)	1
Ashu Bazard (IND)	7
Ivo Iliev (BUL)	9
Eldiiar Satarov (KGZ)	2
Ishak Ghaiou (ALG)	1
Leri Abuladze (GEO)	9
Sebastian Nađ (SRB)	1
Mate Nemeš (SRB)	1

Semifinals
Ashu Bazard (IND)	0
Ivo Iliev (BUL)	8
Leri Abuladze (GEO)	1
Sebastian Nađ (SRB)	3

Final
Ivo Iliev (BUL)	6
Sebastian Nađ (SRB)	6

Repechage round 1
Marlen Asikeev (KGZ)	9
Sachin Sahrawat (IND)	0

Repechage round 2
Pedro Caldas (POR)	2
Eldiiar Satarov (KGZ)	10
Marlen Asikeev (KGZ)	WO
~~Mate Nemeš (SRB)~~

Bronze medal match
Eldiiar Satarov (KGZ)	8
Ashu Bazard (IND)	0
Marlen Asikeev (KGZ)	WO
Leri Abuladze (GEO)

==== Men's Greco-Roman 72 kg ====
Round of 32
	Score	
Róbert Fritsch (HUN)	6–0	Attila Tösmagi (HUN)
Ramaz Zoidze (GEO)	10–3	Anton Korabau (BLR)
Ali Arsalan (SRB)	11–0	Rahul Badshra (IND)

Round of 16
Aleksa Erski (SRB)	5
Shmagi Bolkvadze (GEO)	9
Róbert Fritsch (HUN)	4
Olivér Kajtán (HUN)	0
Deyvid Dimitrov (BUL)	8
Oualid Ghaiou (ALG)	0
Shri Bhagwan (IND)	0
Iuri Lomadze (GEO)	9
Adilkhan Nurlanbekov (KGZ)	3
Giorgi Chkhikvadze (GEO)	6
Ramaz Zoidze (GEO)	1
Otar Abuladze (GEO)	4
~~Mate Nemeš (SRB)~~
Ali Arsalan (SRB)	WO
Michael Portmann (SUI)	1
Alireza Abdevali (IRI)	7

Quarterfinals
Shmagi Bolkvadze (GEO)	2
Róbert Fritsch (HUN)	2
Deyvid Dimitrov (BUL)	1
Iuri Lomadze (GEO)	5
Giorgi Chkhikvadze (GEO)	1
Otar Abuladze (GEO)	5
Ali Arsalan (SRB)	9
Alireza Abdevali (IRI)	0

Semifinals
Róbert Fritsch (HUN)	3
Iuri Lomadze (GEO)	1
Otar Abuladze (GEO)	3
Ali Arsalan (SRB)	8

Final
Róbert Fritsch (HUN)	0
Ali Arsalan (SRB)	8

Repechage round 1
Attila Tösmagi (HUN)	8
Olivér Kajtán (HUN)	0
Rahul Badshra (IND)	WO
~~Mate Nemeš (SRB)~~

Repechage round 2
Attila Tösmagi (HUN)	4
Shmagi Bolkvadze (GEO)	4
Rahul Badshra (IND)	0
Alireza Abdevali (IRI)	5

Bronze medal match
Shmagi Bolkvadze (GEO)	4
Iuri Lomadze (GEO)	3
Alireza Abdevali (IRI)	9^{F}
Otar Abuladze (GEO)	6

==== Men's Greco-Roman 77 kg ====
Round of 32
	Score	
Oliver Krüger (DEN)	1–1	Zoltán Lévai (HUN)
Ilie Cojocari (ROU)	1–3	Akylbek Talantbekov (KGZ)
Akzhol Makhmudov (KGZ)	5–1	Beka Mamukashvili (GEO)
Sagar (IND)	7–3	Martin Dimitrov (BUL)
Davit Sologashvili (GEO)	7–1	Krisztofer Klányi (HUN)
Tsimur Berdyieu (BLR)	9–0	Sonu (IND)

Round of 16
Khvicha Ananidze (GEO)	0
Aik Mnatsakanian (BUL)	8
Zoltán Lévai (HUN)	3
Demuri Kavtaradze (GEO)	2
Aleksa Ilić (SRB)	9
Akylbek Talantbekov (KGZ)	1
Akzhol Makhmudov (KGZ)	11
Zlatomir Emilov (BUL)	0
Sajan Bhanwal (IND)	8
Sagar (IND)	0
Davit Sologashvili (GEO)	6
Tarek Benaissa (ALG)	0
Pavel Liakh (BLR)	3
Tsimur Berdyieu (BLR)	1
~~RaVaughn Perkins (USA)~~
Joílson Júnior (BRA)	WO

Quarterfinals
Aik Mnatsakanian (BUL)	1
Zoltán Lévai (HUN)	1
Aleksa Ilić (SRB)	0
Akzhol Makhmudov (KGZ)	7
Sajan Bhanwal (IND)	15
Davit Sologashvili (GEO)	7
Pavel Liakh (BLR)	9
Joílson Júnior (BRA)	0

Semifinals
Aik Mnatsakanian (BUL)	4
Akzhol Makhmudov (KGZ)	2
Sajan Bhanwal (IND)	2
Pavel Liakh (BLR)	1

Final
Aik Mnatsakanian (BUL)	4^{F}
Sajan Bhanwal (IND)	0

Repechage round 2
Khvicha Ananidze (GEO)	3
Zoltán Lévai (HUN)	5
Sagar (IND)	0
Davit Sologashvili (GEO)	11

Bronze medal match
Zoltán Lévai (HUN)	2
Akzhol Makhmudov (KGZ)	4
Davit Sologashvili (GEO)	1
Pavel Liakh (BLR)	5

==== Men's Greco-Roman 82 kg ====
Round of 32
	Score	
Yogesh Sangwan (IND)	1–7	Móric Kismóni (HUN)
Beka Guruli (GEO)	9–1	Ilias Pagkalidis (GRE)
Abdelkrim Ouakali (ALG)	2–4	Péter Dömök (HUN)

Round of 16
Ivaylo Ivanov (BUL)	1
Kalidin Asykeev (KGZ)	9
Móric Kismóni (HUN)	1
Alireza Mohmadi (IRI)	8
Gela Bolkvadze (GEO)	9
Vasile Cojoc (ROU)	0
Branko Kovačević (SRB)	9
Marc Weber (SUI)	1
Tornike Dzamashvili (GEO)	4
Dominik Mezei (HUN)	1
Beka Guruli (GEO)	1
Tamás Lévai (HUN)	3
Georgios Prevolarakis (GRE)	2
Péter Dömök (HUN)	7
Patrik Mezei (HUN)	8
Ravi Malik (IND)	0

Quarterfinals
Kalidin Asykeev (KGZ)	1
Alireza Mohmadi (IRI)	6
Gela Bolkvadze (GEO)	7
Branko Kovačević (SRB)	5
Tornike Dzamashvili (GEO)	1
Tamás Lévai (HUN)	3
Péter Dömök (HUN)	6
Patrik Mezei (HUN)	7

Semifinals
Alireza Mohmadi (IRI)	1
Gela Bolkvadze (GEO)	3
Tamás Lévai (HUN)	4^{F}
Patrik Mezei (HUN)	1

Final
Gela Bolkvadze (GEO)	7
Tamás Lévai (HUN)	1

Repechage round 2
Vasile Cojoc (ROU)	6
Branko Kovačević (SRB)	12^{C}
Beka Guruli (GEO)	1
Tornike Dzamashvili (GEO)	3

Bronze medal match
Branko Kovačević (SRB)	1
Alireza Mohmadi (IRI)	3
Tornike Dzamashvili (GEO)	WO
Patrik Mezei (HUN)

==== Men's Greco-Roman 87 kg ====
Round of 32
	Score	
Mario Vuković (SRB)	WO	~~Ariel Alfonso (HON)~~
István Takács (HUN)	9–1	Žarko Dickov (SRB)
Kiryl Maskevich (BLR)	8–0	Marcel Sterkenburg (NED)
Ramon Betschart (SUI)	7–5	Sunil Kumar (IND)
Erik Szilvássy (HUN)	2–3	Yoan Dimitrov (BUL)
Beka Melelashvili (GEO)	1–3	Bachir Sid Azara (ALG)
Azat Salidinov (KGZ)	3–1	Damian von Euw (SUI)

Round of 16
Kaloyan Ivanov (BUL)	0
Nicu Ojog (ROU)	11
Mario Vuković (SRB)	5
Lasha Gobadze (GEO)	1
Svetoslav Nikolov (BUL)	1
István Takács (HUN)	3
Kiryl Maskevich (BLR)	9
Rajneesh Dalal (IND)	0
Gurami Khetsuriani (GEO)	WO
Ramon Betschart (SUI)
Yoan Dimitrov (BUL)	9
Christian Zemp (SUI)	0
Robert Kobliashvili (GEO)	9^{F}
Bachir Sid Azara (ALG)	0
Azat Salidinov (KGZ)	8
Melis Aitbekov (KGZ)	0

Quarterfinals
Nicu Ojog (ROU)	9
Mario Vuković (SRB)	1
István Takács (HUN)	2
Kiryl Maskevich (BLR)	10
Gurami Khetsuriani (GEO)	3
Yoan Dimitrov (BUL)	1
Robert Kobliashvili (GEO)	9
Azat Salidinov (KGZ)	0

Semifinals
Nicu Ojog (ROU)	0
Kiryl Maskevich (BLR)	4^{F}
Gurami Khetsuriani (GEO)	1
Robert Kobliashvili (GEO)	3

Final
Kiryl Maskevich (BLR)	WO
Robert Kobliashvili (GEO)

Repechage round 1
Marcel Sterkenburg (NED)	8
Rajneesh Dalal (IND)	0

Repechage round 2
Marcel Sterkenburg (NED)	1
István Takács (HUN)	5
Bachir Sid Azara (ALG)	8
Azat Salidinov (KGZ)	5

Bronze medal match
István Takács (HUN)	3
Nicu Ojog (ROU)	1
Bachir Sid Azara (ALG)	2
Gurami Khetsuriani (GEO)	2

==== Men's Greco-Roman 97 kg ====
Round of 32
	Score	
~~Kevin Mejía (HON)~~	WO	Mathias Bak (DEN)
Giorgi Melia (GEO)	9–0	Adem Boudjemline (ALG)
Aleksandar Simović (SRB)	WO	~~G'Angelo Hancock (USA)~~
Hardeep Singh (IND)	5–8	Mariyan Marinov (BUL)

Round of 16
Uzur Dzhuzupbekov (KGZ)	9
László Varsányi (HUN)	1
Mathias Bak (DEN)	0
Kiril Milov (BUL)	9
Mikheil Kajaia (SRB)	1
Giorgi Melia (GEO)	6^{F}
Róbert Érsek (HUN)	7
Deepanshu Ahlawat (IND)	0
Giorgi Katsanashvili (GEO)	WO
Tyrone Sterkenburg (NED)
Aleksandar Simović (SRB)	WO
~~Gino Ávila (HON)~~
Ravi Rathee (IND)	5
Mariyan Marinov (BUL)	10
Revaz Nadareishvili (GEO)	10^{F}
Igor Queiroz (BRA)	0

Quarterfinals
Uzur Dzhuzupbekov (KGZ)	0
Kiril Milov (BUL)	9
Giorgi Melia (GEO)	9
Róbert Érsek (HUN)	0
Giorgi Katsanashvili (GEO)	4^{F}
Aleksandar Simović (SRB)	0
Mariyan Marinov (BUL)	0
Revaz Nadareishvili (GEO)	8

Semifinals
Kiril Milov (BUL)	9
Giorgi Melia (GEO)	0
Giorgi Katsanashvili (GEO)	1
Revaz Nadareishvili (GEO)	4

Final
Kiril Milov (BUL)	WO
Revaz Nadareishvili (GEO)

Repechage round 2
Mathias Bak (DEN)	1^{R}
Uzur Dzhuzupbekov (KGZ)	2
Igor Queiroz (BRA)	3
Mariyan Marinov (BUL)	11

Bronze medal match
Uzur Dzhuzupbekov (KGZ)	WO
~~Giorgi Melia (GEO)~~
Mariyan Marinov (BUL)	0
Giorgi Katsanashvili (GEO)	9

==== Men's Greco-Roman 130 kg ====
Round of 16
Sahil Una (IND)	2
Artúr Végh (HUN)	5
Dáriusz Vitek (HUN)	1
Delian Alishahi (SUI)	1
Georgi Chugoshvili (BLR)	3
Giorgi Tsopurashvili (GEO)	1
Roman Kim (KGZ)	1
Alin Alexuc-Ciurariu (ROU)	1
Tanner Farmer (USA)	9
Mehar Singh (IND)	0
Hichem Kouchit (ALG)	1
Adolf Bazsó (HUN)	10

Quarterfinals
Radoslav Georgiev (BUL)	9
Artúr Végh (HUN)	0
Delian Alishahi (SUI)	4
Georgi Chugoshvili (BLR)	1
Alin Alexuc-Ciurariu (ROU)	4^{F}
Tanner Farmer (USA)	7
Adolf Bazsó (HUN)	2
Lenard Berei (ROU)	7

Semifinals
Radoslav Georgiev (BUL)	3
Delian Alishahi (SUI)	10^{C}
Alin Alexuc-Ciurariu (ROU)	8
Lenard Berei (ROU)	0

Final
Delian Alishahi (SUI)	1
Alin Alexuc-Ciurariu (ROU)	3

Repechage round 1
Dáriusz Vitek (HUN)	9
Georgi Chugoshvili (BLR)	1
Roman Kim (KGZ)	0
Tanner Farmer (USA)	8

Bronze medal match
Dáriusz Vitek (HUN)	WO
~~Radoslav Georgiev (BUL)~~
Tanner Farmer (USA)	1
Lenard Berei (ROU)	7

== See also ==
- 2022 Dan Kolov & Nikola Petrov Tournament – Women's freestyle
