= Ali Arsalan =

Serbian Greco-Roman wrestler

Personal information
- Native name: علی ارسلان
- Full name: Ali Arsalan
- Nationality: Iran
- Born: Farbod Arsalan; 8 May 1995 (age 31) Amol, Mazandaran, Iran
- Height: 174 cm (5 ft 9 in)

Sport
- Country: Serbia (2022–present); Iran (2011–2021)
- Sport: Amateur wrestling
- Weight class: 72 kg
- Event: Greco-Roman
- Club: Takhti Amol; Fooladin Zob Amol; RK Spartak
- Coached by: Hassan Hosseinzadeh; Bakhtiar Taghavinia; Ghasem Rezaei; Amir Hossein Hosseini

Achievements and titles
- World finals: (gold) (2022) (bronze) (2023) (2024)
- Regional finals: (bronze) (2017) (bronze) (2022)
Medal record
Men's Greco-Roman wrestling
Representing Serbia
World Championships
Gold medal – first place	2022 Belgrade	72 kg
Bronze medal – third place	2023 Belgrade	72 kg
Bronze medal – third place	2024 Tirana	72 kg
European Championships
Bronze medal – third place	2022 Budapest	72 kg
Dan Kolov & Nikola Petrov Tournament
Gold medal – first place	2022 Veliko Tarnovo	72 kg
Gold medal – first place	2021 Plovdiv	72 kg
Ljubomir Ivanovic Gedza Memorial Tournament
Silver medal – second place	2023 Mladenovac	72 kg
Muhamet Malo Tournament
Bronze medal – third place	2025 Tirana	72 kg
Representing Iran
World Cup
Bronze medal – third place	2017 Abadan	66 kg
Asian Championships
Bronze medal – third place	2017 New Delhi	66 kg
Dan Kolov & Nikola Petrov Tournament
Gold medal – first place	2021 Plovdiv	72 kg
World Juniors Championships
Bronze medal – third place	2015 Salvador da Bahia	66 kg
Asian Juniors Championships
Gold medal – first place	2015 Naypyidaw	66 kg
Gold medal – first place	2014 Ulaanbaatar	60 kg
Asian Cadets Championships
Gold medal – first place	2012 Bishkek	54 kg
Gold medal – first place	2011 Bangkok	50 kg

Ali Arsalan (Persian: علی ارسلان, Serbian Cyrillic: Али Арсалан, born 8 May 1995) is an Iranian-born naturalized Serbian Greco-Roman wrestler. He won the gold medal in the 72 kg event at the 2022 World Wrestling Championships held in Belgrade, Serbia. This is the first medal for Serbia in the Greco-Roman style at the World Championship in Belgrade. He represented Iran until December 2021.

He won one of the bronze medals in the 72 kg event at the 2022 European Wrestling Championships held in Budapest, Hungary.

== Career ==
He won one of the bronze medals in the men's 66 kg event at the 2015 World Junior Wrestling Championships held in Salvador da Bahia, Brazil. He also won one of the bronze medals in the men's 66 kg event at the 2017 Asian Wrestling Championships held in New Delhi, India.

He won the gold medal in the men's 72 kg at the 2021 Dan Kolov & Nikola Petrov Tournament held in Plovdiv, Bulgaria and the 2022 Dan Kolov & Nikola Petrov Tournament held in Veliko Tarnovo, Bulgaria.

== Achievements ==
Year	Tournament	Location	Result	Event
2014	Asian Junior Championships	Ulaanbaatar, Mongolia	1st	Greco-Roman 60 kg
2015	Asian Junior Championships	Naypyidaw, Myanmar	1st	Greco-Roman 66 kg
2015	World Junior Championships	Salvador da Bahia, Brazil	3rd	Greco-Roman 66 kg
2017	Asian Championships	New Delhi, India	3rd	Greco-Roman 66 kg
2017	World Cup	Abadan, Iran	3rd	Greco-Roman 66 kg
2022	European Championships	Budapest, Hungary	3rd	Greco-Roman 72 kg
2022	World Championships	Belgrade, Serbia	1st	Greco-Roman 72 kg
2023	World Championships	Belgrade, Serbia	3rd	Greco-Roman 72 kg
2024	World Championships	Albania, Tirana	3rd	Greco-Roman 72 kg
