= Anıl Kılıçsallayan =

Turkish freestyle wrestler

Personal information
- Full name: Anıl Berkan Kılıçsallayan
- Born: Kahramanmaraş
- Education: Kahramanmaraş Sütçüimam University

Sport
- Country: Turkey
- Sport: Amateur wrestling
- Weight class: 125 kg
- Event: Freestyle
- Club: Kahramanmaraş BBSK
Medal record
Men's freestyle wrestling
Representing Turkey
Yasar Dogu Tournament
| Bronze medal – third place | 2021 Istanbul | 125 kg |
Dan Kolov & Nikola Petrov Tournament
| Bronze medal – third place | 2021 Plovdiv | 125 kg |
European U23 Championship
| Gold medal – first place | 2021 Skopje | 125 kg |
European Cadet Championships
| Silver medal – second place | 2017 Sarajevo | 100 kg |

Anıl Berkan Kılıçsallayan is a Turkish freestyle wrestler competing in the 125 kg division. He is a member of Kahramanmaraş BBSK.

== Career ==
In 2021, he won the gold medal in the men's 125 kg event at the 2021 European U23 Wrestling Championship held in Skopje, North Macedonia.
