= Bilyana Dudova =

Bulgarian freestyle wrestler (born 1997)

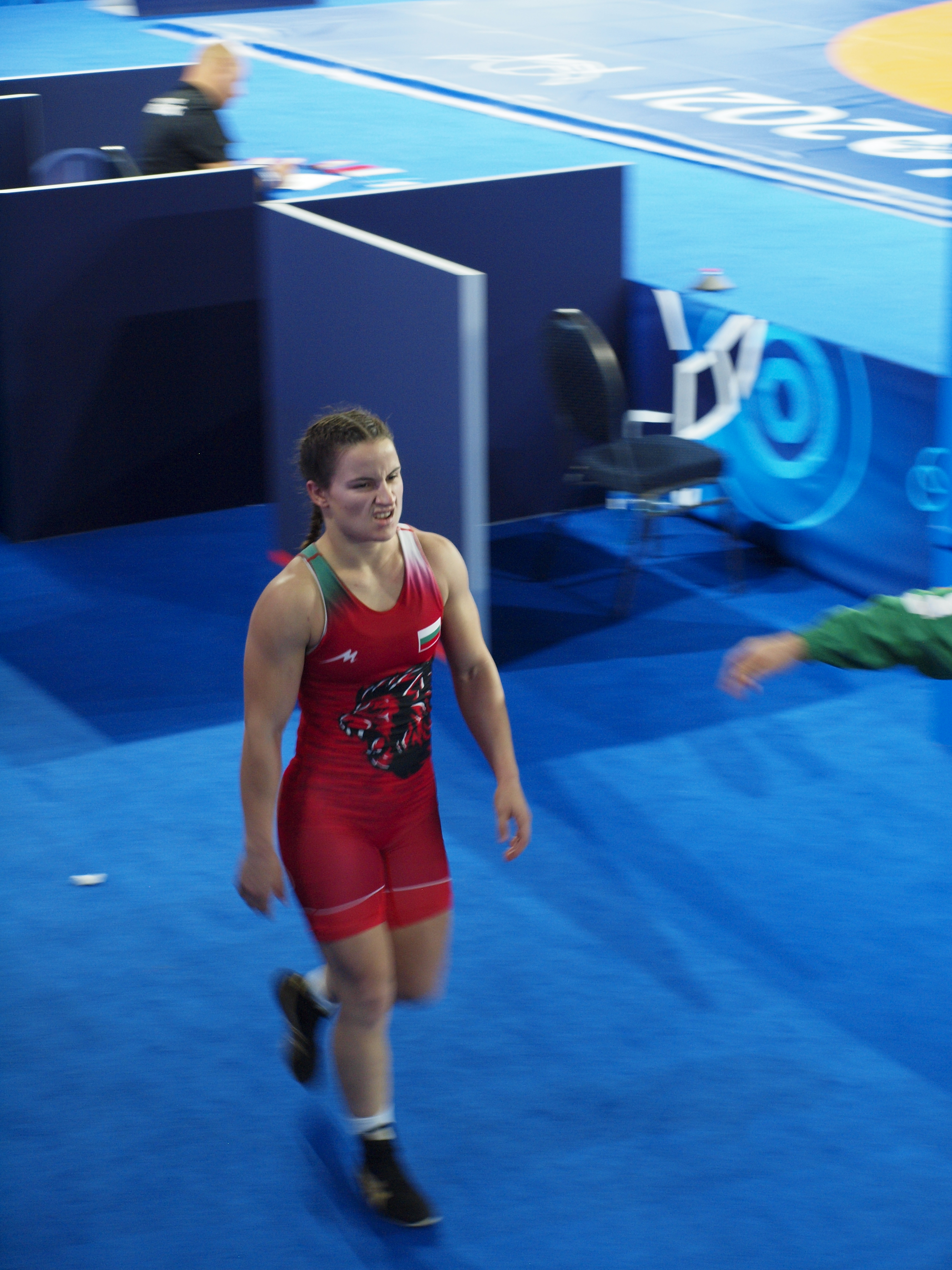
- Dudova at the 2021 World Wrestling Championships in Oslo, Norway

Personal information
- Native name: Биляна Живкова Дудова
- Full name: Bilyana Zhivkova Dudova
- Born: 1 August 1997 (age 29) Vratsa, Bulgaria
- Height: 161 cm (5 ft 3 in)

Sport
- Country: Bulgaria
- Sport: Amateur wrestling
- Weight class: 59 kg; 62 kg
- Event: Freestyle
Medal record
Women's freestyle wrestling
Representing Bulgaria
World Championships
Gold medal – first place	2021 Oslo	59 kg
Silver medal – second place	2018 Budapest	57 kg
Bronze medal – third place	2026 Astana	62 kg
European Championships
Gold medal – first place	2017 Novi Sad	55 kg
Gold medal – first place	2018 Kaspiysk	57 kg
Gold medal – first place	2019 Bucharest	59 kg
Gold medal – first place	2021 Warsaw	59 kg
Silver medal – second place	2020 Rome	59 kg
Bronze medal – third place	2023 Zagreb	62 kg
Bronze medal – third place	2025 Bratislava	62 kg
Dan Kolov & Nikola Petrov Tournament
Gold medal – first place	2016 Sofia	55 kg
Gold medal – first place	2021 Plovdiv	57 kg
Gold medal – first place	2022 Tarnovo	62 kg
Gold medal – first place	2025 Varna	65 kg
Gold medal – first place	2026 Plovdiv	62 kg
Silver medal – second place	2017 Ruse	55 kg
Silver medal – second place	2024 Sofia	62 kg
Bronze medal – third place	2015 Sofia	55 kg
Bronze medal – third place	2018 Sofia	57 kg
Yasar Dogu Tournament
Gold medal – first place	2021 Istanbul	57 kg
Silver medal – second place	2020 Istanbul	57 kg
Silver medal – second place	2025 Kocaeli	62 kg
Golden Grand Prix Ivan Yarygin
Bronze medal – third place	2019 Krasnoyarsk	57 kg
Grand Prix
Silver medal – second place	2023 Budapest	62 kg
Silver medal – second place	2024 Madrid	62 kg
Silver medal – second place	2025 Tirana	62 kg
Bronze medal – third place	2023 Zagreb	62 kg
Bronze medal – third place	2025 Zagreb	62 kg
European U23 Championship
Gold medal – first place	2018 Istanbul	59 kg

Bilyana Dudova (Bulgarian: Биляна Живкова Дудова, born 1 August 1997) is a Bulgarian freestyle wrestler. She won the gold medal in the women's 59 kg event at the 2021 World Wrestling Championships in Oslo, Norway. She also won silver at the 2018 World Wrestling Championships and she is a seven-time medalist, including four golds, at the European Wrestling Championships.

== Career ==
In 2016, Dudova competed in the 53 kg event at the European Wrestling Championships held in Riga, Latvia. She also competed at the European Olympic Qualification Tournament hoping to qualify for the 2016 Summer Olympics in Rio de Janeiro, Brazil.

In 2017, Dudova won the gold medal in the 55 kg event at the European Wrestling Championships held in Novi Sad, Serbia. She repeated this in 2018 in the 57 kg event and in 2019 in the 59 kg event. In 2020, she won the silver medal in the women's 59 kg event. In the final, she lost against Anastasia Nichita of Moldova.

At the 2018 European U23 Wrestling Championship in Istanbul, Turkey, she won the gold medal in the women's 59 kg event. In that same year, Dudova won the silver medal in the women's 57 kg event at the 2018 World Wrestling Championships held in Budapest, Hungary. In the final, she lost against Rong Ningning of China.

In 2021, Dudova won the gold medal in the 57 kg event at the Dan Kolov & Nikola Petrov Tournament held in Plovdiv, Bulgaria. She also won the gold medal in the 59 kg event at the European Wrestling Championships held in Warsaw, Poland. She defeated Veronika Chumikova of Russia in the final.

Dudova won the gold medal in the 62 kg event at the 2022 Dan Kolov & Nikola Petrov Tournament held in Veliko Tarnovo, Bulgaria. She also competed at the Yasar Dogu Tournament held in Istanbul, Turkey. In that same year, Dudova competed in the 62 kg event at the 2022 World Wrestling Championships held in Belgrade, Serbia where she was eliminated in her second match by Aisuluu Tynybekova of Kyrgyzstan.

Dudova won one of the bronze medals in the 62 kg event at the 2023 European Wrestling Championships held in Zagreb, Croatia. She lost her bronze medal match in the 62 kg event at the 2023 World Wrestling Championships held in Belgrade, Serbia.

Dudova competed in the 62 kg event at the 2024 European Wrestling Championships held in Bucharest, Romania. She was eliminated in her second match. She competed at the 2024 European Wrestling Olympic Qualification Tournament in Baku, Azerbaijan and she earned a quota place for Bulgaria for the 2024 Summer Olympics in Paris, France. Dudova competed in the women's 62 kg event at the Olympics. In the quarterfinals, she lost her match against Iryna Koliadenko of Ukraine and she was eliminated in the repechage by Pürevdorjiin Orkhon of Mongolia.

== Achievements ==
Year	Tournament	Location	Result	Event
2017	European Championships	Novi Sad, Serbia	1st	Freestyle 55 kg
2018	European Championships	Kaspiysk, Russia	1st	Freestyle 57 kg
2018	World Championships	Budapest, Hungary	2nd	Freestyle 57 kg
2019	European Championships	Bucharest, Romania	1st	Freestyle 59 kg
2020	European Championships	Rome, Italy	2nd	Freestyle 59 kg
2021	European Championships	Warsaw, Poland	1st	Freestyle 59 kg
2021	World Championships	Oslo, Norway	1st	Freestyle 59 kg
2023	European Championships	Zagreb, Croatia	3rd	Freestyle 62 kg
2025	European Championships	Bratislava, Slovakia	3rd	Freestyle 62 kg
