= 2021 Dan Kolov & Nikola Petrov Tournament =

- Host city: Plovdiv, Bulgaria
- Dates: 8–11 April 2021

The 58th Dan Kolov & Nikola Petrov Tournament was a sport wrestling event held in Plovdiv, Bulgaria between 8 and 11 April 2021.

This international tournament includes competition in both men's and women's freestyle wrestling and men's Greco-Roman wrestling. This tournament is held in honor of Dan Kolov who was the first European freestyle wrestling champion from Bulgaria and European and World Champion Nikola Petroff.

== Event videos ==
The event was aired freely on the Bulgarian Wrestling Federation Live YouTube channel.

Broadcast
| 8 April 2021-Qualification Mat A | 8 April 2021-Qualification Mat B | 8 April 2021-Qualification Mat C | 8 April 2021-Qualification Schedule |
| 8 April 2021-1/2 Finals Mat A | 8 April 2021-1/2 Finals Mat B | | |
| 9 April 2021-Qualification Mat A | 9 April 2021-Qualification Mat B | 9 April 2021-Qualification Mat C | 9 April 2021-Qualification Schedule |
| 9 April 2021-Finals Mat A | 9 April 2021-Finals Mat B | 9 April 2021-Finals Schedule | |
| 10 April 2021-Qualification Mat A | 10 April 2021-Qualification Mat B | 10 April 2021-Qualification Mat C | 10 April 2021-Qualification Schedule |
| 10 April 2021-Finals Mat A | 10 April 2021-Finals Mat B | 10 April 2021-Finals Mat C | 10 April 2021-Finals Schedule |
| 11 April 2021-Finals Mat A | 11 April 2021-Finals Mat B | 11 April 2021-Finals Mat C | 11 April 2021-Finals Schedule |

== Medal table ==
| Rank | Nation | Gold | Silver | Bronze | Total |
|---|---|---|---|---|---|
| 1 | Bulgaria | 6 | 3 | 7 | 16 |
| 2 | Iran | 6 | 1 | 0 | 7 |
| 3 | Georgia | 3 | 3 | 6 | 12 |
| 4 | Venezuela | 3 | 3 | 1 | 7 |
| 5 | Serbia | 2 | 2 | 2 | 6 |
| 6 | Ecuador | 2 | 1 | 0 | 3 |
| 6 | Hungary | 2 | 1 | 0 | 3 |
| 8 | Turkey | 1 | 3 | 11 | 15 |
| 9 | Kazakhstan | 1 | 3 | 9 | 13 |
| 10 | Brazil | 1 | 2 | 0 | 3 |
| 11 | Argentina | 1 | 0 | 1 | 2 |
| 12 | Ukraine | 0 | 2 | 0 | 2 |
| 13 | Germany | 0 | 1 | 2 | 3 |
| 14 | Romania | 0 | 1 | 1 | 2 |
| 15 | Chile | 0 | 1 | 0 | 1 |
| 15 | Colombia | 0 | 1 | 0 | 1 |
| 17 | Sweden | 0 | 0 | 2 | 2 |
| 18 | Egypt | 0 | 0 | 1 | 1 |
| 18 | Latvia | 0 | 0 | 1 | 1 |
| Totals (19 entries) | | 28 | 28 | 44 | 100 |

== Team ranking ==
| Rank | Men's freestyle | | Men's Greco-Roman | | Women's freestyle | |
| Rank | Team | Points | Team | Points | Team | Points |
|---|---|---|---|---|---|---|
| 1 | Kazakhstan | 145 | Bulgaria | 175 | Hungary | 100 |
| 2 | Georgia | 123 | Serbia | 135 | Bulgaria | 99 |
| 3 | Turkey | 111 | Turkey | 135 | Venezuela | 85 |
| 4 | Bulgaria | 107 | Georgia | 128 | Brazil | 65 |
| 5 | Iran | 100 | Iran | 78 | Ecuador | 55 |

== Medal overview ==
=== Men's freestyle ===
| Event | Gold | Silver | Bronze |
|---|---|---|---|
| 57 kg | Naim Mikyay; Bulgaria | Volodymyr Burukov; Ukraine | Hafız Can Hasdemir; Turkey |
| 57 kg | Naim Mikyay; Bulgaria | Volodymyr Burukov; Ukraine | Mukhamed Balgabay; Kazakhstan |
| 61 kg | Nurislam Sanayev; Kazakhstan | Teimuraz Vanishvili; Georgia | Nurbolat Abdualiyev; Kazakhstan |
| 65 kg | Agustín Destribats; Argentina | Stefan Ionut Coman; Romania | Adil Ospanov; Kazakhstan |
| 65 kg | Agustín Destribats; Argentina | Stefan Ionut Coman; Romania | Timur Aitkulov; Kazakhstan |
| 70 kg | Giorgi Elbakidze; Georgia | Nurzhan Seitzhan; Kazakhstan | Cüneyt Budak; Turkey |
| 70 kg | Giorgi Elbakidze; Georgia | Nurzhan Seitzhan; Kazakhstan | Samat Kaltayev; Kazakhstan |
| 74 kg | Jamal Ebadi; Iran | Nurlan Bekzhanov; Kazakhstan | Darkhan Yessengali; Kazakhstan |
| 74 kg | Jamal Ebadi; Iran | Nurlan Bekzhanov; Kazakhstan | Vladimeri Gamkrelidze; Georgia |
| 79 kg | Hamidreza Zarinpeykar; Iran | Umur Aybey; Turkey | Ramazan Zhuyntayev; Kazakhstan |
| 79 kg | Hamidreza Zarinpeykar; Iran | Umur Aybey; Turkey | Bolat Sakayev; Kazakhstan |
| 86 kg | Pedro Ceballos; Venezuela | Khasan Zakariiev; Ukraine | Mihai Palaghia; Romania |
| 86 kg | Pedro Ceballos; Venezuela | Khasan Zakariiev; Ukraine | Evelin Rusev; Bulgaria |
| 92 kg | Miriani Maisuradze; Georgia | Mustafa Kıyı; Turkey | Aslan Dzicoev; Kazakhstan |
| 97 kg | Mojtaba Goleij; Iran | Mamed Ibragimov; Kazakhstan | Georgii Dimitrov; Bulgaria |
| 97 kg | Mojtaba Goleij; Iran | Mamed Ibragimov; Kazakhstan | Luka KhuTchua; Georgia |
| 125 kg | Amin Taheri; Iran | José Daniel Díaz; Venezuela | Anıl Kılıçsallayan; Turkey |

=== Greco-Roman ===
| Event | Gold | Silver | Bronze |
|---|---|---|---|
| 55 kg | Adem Uzun; Turkey | Nedyalko Petrov; Bulgaria | Ömer Halis Recep; Turkey |
| 55 kg | Adem Uzun; Turkey | Nedyalko Petrov; Bulgaria | Stefan Grigorov; Bulgaria |
| 60 kg | Pouya Naserpour; Iran | Dicther Hans Castaneda; Colombia | Ahmet Uyar; Turkey |
| 60 kg | Pouya Naserpour; Iran | Dicther Hans Castaneda; Colombia | Andrey Georgiev; Bulgaria |
| 63 kg | Andrés Montaño; Ecuador | Perica Dimitrijevic; Serbia | Kerim Machalikashvili; Georgia |
| 63 kg | Andrés Montaño; Ecuador | Perica Dimitrijevic; Serbia | Abdulkadir Saydam; Turkey |
| 67 kg | Deyvid Dimitrov; Bulgaria | Sebastian Nad; Serbia | Mate Nemeš; Serbia |
| 67 kg | Deyvid Dimitrov; Bulgaria | Sebastian Nad; Serbia | Kadir Kamal; Turkey |
| 72 kg | Ali Arsalan; Iran | Maximilian Schwabe; Germany | Aleksandar Maksimović; Serbia |
| 72 kg | Ali Arsalan; Iran | Maximilian Schwabe; Germany | Otar Abuladze; Georgia |
| 77 kg | Stoyan Kubatov; Bulgaria | Nikoloz Tchikaidze; Georgia | Furkan Dülger; Turkey |
| 77 kg | Stoyan Kubatov; Bulgaria | Nikoloz Tchikaidze; Georgia | Erkan Ergen; Turkey |
| 82 kg | Branko Kovacevic; Serbia | Bakuri Gogoli; Georgia | Marius Braun; Germany |
| 82 kg | Branko Kovacevic; Serbia | Bakuri Gogoli; Georgia | Rosian Dermanski; Bulgaria |
| 87 kg | Zurab Datunashvili; Serbia | Mahdi Fallahhamidabadi; Iran | Daniel Aleksandrov; Bulgaria |
| 87 kg | Zurab Datunashvili; Serbia | Mahdi Fallahhamidabadi; Iran | Temuri Tchkuaselidze; Georgia |
| 97 kg | Giorgi Katsiashvili; Georgia | Luillys Pérez; Venezuela | Peter Ohler; Germany |
| 97 kg | Giorgi Katsiashvili; Georgia | Luillys Pérez; Venezuela | Simeon Stankovich; Bulgaria |
| 130 kg | Radoslav Georgiev; Bulgaria | Fatih Bozkurt; Turkey | Hamza Bakır; Turkey |
| 130 kg | Radoslav Georgiev; Bulgaria | Fatih Bozkurt; Turkey | Atalay Aydemir; Turkey |

=== Women's freestyle ===
| Event | Gold | Silver | Bronze |
|---|---|---|---|
| 50 kg | Lucía Yépez; Ecuador | Kamila Barbosa; Brazil | Jekaterina Jermakova; Latvia |
| 53 kg | Betzabeth Argüello; Venezuela | Luisa Valverde; Ecuador | Szimonetta Szekér; Hungary |
| 57 kg | Bilyana Dudova; Bulgaria | Giullia Penalber; Brazil | Ramóna Galambos; Hungary |
| 59 kg | Tamara Dollak; Hungary | Javiera Roco; Chile | Teona Jandagashvili; Georgia |
| 62 kg | Laís Nunes; Brazil | Nathaly Grimán; Venezuela | Johanna Mattsson; Sweden |
| 65 kg | Sofia Georgieva; Bulgaria | Noémi Szabados; Hungary | Linnéa Svensson; Sweden |
| 68 kg | Soleymi Caraballo; Venezuela | Mimi Hristova; Bulgaria | Luz Clara Vazquez; Argentina |
| 76 kg | Zsanett Németh; Hungary | Mariya Oryashkova; Bulgaria | María Acosta; Venezuela |
| 76 kg | Zsanett Németh; Hungary | Mariya Oryashkova; Bulgaria | Samar Amer; Egypt |

== Participating nations ==
233 competitors from 25 nations participated.

- Argentina (3)
- Brazil (3)
- Bulgaria (53)
- Canada (1)
- Chile (8)
- Colombia (7)
- Ecuador (4)
- Egypt (2)
- Georgia (23)
- Germany (3)
- Greece (3)
- Honduras (3)
- Hungary (8)
- Iran (8)
- Kazakhstan (23)
- Latvia (3)
- North Macedonia (2)
- Panama (2)
- Romania (6)
- Serbia (11)
- Sweden (4)
- Tunisia (24)
- Turkey (37)
- Ukraine (4)
- Venezuela (12)
