= 2021 Yasar Dogu Tournament =

Yasar Dogu 2021
- Host city: Istanbul, Turkey
- Dates: 25–27 June 2021
- Stadium: Pullman Otel

Champions
- Freestyle: Turkey
- Women: Bulgaria

The 49th Yasar Dogu Tournament 2021, was a wrestling event held in Istanbul, Turkey between 25 and 27 June 2021.

The international tournament included competition in both men's and women's freestyle wrestling. The tournament was held in honor of the two time Olympic Champion, Yaşar Doğu.

== Medal table ==
Rank	Nation	Gold	Silver	Bronze	Total
1	Iran	5	1	3	9
2	Bulgaria	5	1	1	7
3	Turkey	3	6	13	22
4	Germany	2	1	0	3
5	Kyrgyzstan	1	2	2	5
6	Canada	1	2	1	4
7	Georgia	1	1	2	4
8	Azerbaijan	1	0	0	1
8	Belarus	1	0	0	1
10	Kazakhstan	0	5	5	10
11	Romania	0	1	2	3
12	France	0	0	1	1
12	Tunisia	0	0	1	1
Totals (13 entries)		20	20	31	71

=== Team ranking ===
Rank	Men's freestyle		Women's freestyle	
Rank	Team	Points	Team	Points
1	Turkey	171	Bulgaria	145
2	Iran	159	Turkey	143
3	Georgia	93	Kazakhstan	132
4	Kyrgyzstan	80	Canada	80
5	Kazakhstan	80	Germany	70

== Medal overview ==
=== Men's freestyle ===
Event	Gold	Silver	Bronze
57 kg	(Iran) Ali Gholizadegan	(Kyrgyzstan) Almaz Smanbekov	(Bulgaria) Georgi Vangelov
57 kg	(Iran) Ali Gholizadegan	(Kyrgyzstan) Almaz Smanbekov	(Kyrgyzstan) Bekbolat Myrzanazar Uulu
61 kg	(Iran) Rahman Amouzad	(Kazakhstan) Assyl Aitakyn	(Kyrgyzstan) Ulukbek Zholdoshbekov
61 kg	(Iran) Rahman Amouzad	(Kazakhstan) Assyl Aitakyn	(Turkey) Ahmet Duman
65 kg	(Kyrgyzstan) Alibek Osmonov	(Kyrgyzstan) Ernazar Akmataliev	(Iran) Hassan Ebadi
65 kg	(Kyrgyzstan) Alibek Osmonov	(Kyrgyzstan) Ernazar Akmataliev	(Iran) Kian Mahmoudjanloo
70 kg	(Georgia (country)) Zurab Iakobishuili	(Georgia (country)) Levan Kelekhsoshvili	(Turkey) Selahattin Kılıçsallayan
70 kg	(Georgia (country)) Zurab Iakobishuili	(Georgia (country)) Levan Kelekhsoshvili	(Iran) Erfan Elahi
74 kg	(Turkey) Yakup Gör	(Turkey) İsa Demir	(Kazakhstan) Darkhan Yessengali
74 kg	(Turkey) Yakup Gör	(Turkey) İsa Demir	(Turkey) Zafre Dama
79 kg	(Iran) Mohammad Nokhodi	(Iran) Hamid Reza Zarinpeyker	(Turkey) Hasan Emin Gürbüz
79 kg	(Iran) Mohammad Nokhodi	(Iran) Hamid Reza Zarinpeyker	(Georgia (country)) Tariel Gaphrindashvili
86 kg	(Iran) Amir Hossein Firouzpour	(Turkey) Serdal Çavuşoğlu	(France) Akhmed Aibuev
86 kg	(Iran) Amir Hossein Firouzpour	(Turkey) Serdal Çavuşoğlu	(Turkey) Fatih Erdin
92 kg	(Turkey) Selim Yaşar	(Turkey) Erhan Yaylacı	(Turkey) Samet Özarslan
92 kg	(Turkey) Selim Yaşar	(Turkey) Erhan Yaylacı	(Kazakhstan) Adilet Davlumbayev
97 kg	(Azerbaijan) Sharif Sharifov	(Turkey) Mustafa Sessiz	(Turkey) İbrahim Çiftçi
97 kg	(Azerbaijan) Sharif Sharifov	(Turkey) Mustafa Sessiz	(Georgia (country)) Givi Matcharashvili
125 kg	(Iran) Abbas Foroutan	(Turkey) Fatih Yaşarlı	(Turkey) Anıl Kılıçsallayan
125 kg	(Iran) Abbas Foroutan	(Turkey) Fatih Yaşarlı	(Turkey) Oktay Güngör

=== Women's freestyle ===
Event	Gold	Silver	Bronze
50 kg	(Bulgaria) Miglena Selishka	(Romania) Alina Vuc	(Tunisia) Sarra Hamdi
53 kg	(Belarus) Vanesa Kaladzinskaya	(Canada) Karla Godinez	(Turkey) Rahime Arı
53 kg	(Belarus) Vanesa Kaladzinskaya	(Canada) Karla Godinez	(Romania) Andreea Ana
55 kg	(Turkey) Mehlika Öztürk	(Kazakhstan) Aisha Valishan	(Kazakhstan) Sandugash Dyussengalieva
57 kg	(Bulgaria) Bilyana Dudova	(Germany) Elena Brugger	(Canada) Linda Morais
59 kg	(Bulgaria) Evelina Nikolova	(Canada) Amy Bellavia	(Turkey) Elif Yanık
62 kg	(Bulgaria) Taybe Yusein	(Kazakhstan) Ayaulym Kassymova	(Romania) Kriszta Incze
65 kg	(Bulgaria) Sofia Georgieva	(Kazakhstan) Aina Temirtassova	(Kazakhstan) Mukatay Cavkhar
68 kg	(Canada) Olivia Di Bacco	(Bulgaria) Mimi Hristova	(Kazakhstan) Zhamila Bakbergenova
72 kg	(Germany) Anna Schell	(Kazakhstan) Valeriya Goncharova	(Turkey) Merve Pul
76 kg	(Germany) Francy Rädelt	(Turkey) Mehtap Gültekin	(Turkey) Ayşegül Özbege

== Participating nations ==
191 competitors from 16 nations participated.

- Azerbaijan (1)
- Belarus (2)
- Bulgaria (9)
- Canada (8)
- France (5)
- Georgia (19)
- Germany (3)
- Iran (13)
- Kazakhstan (37)
- Kyrgyzstan (12)
- Moldova (3)
- Romania (3)
- Peru (1)
- Palestine (1)
- Tunisia (4)
- Turkey (70)

== See also ==
- 2021 Vehbi Emre & Hamit Kaplan Tournament
- 2021 Dan Kolov & Nikola Petrov Tournament
- Golden Grand Prix Ivan Yarygin 2021
- 2021 Grand Prix Zagreb Open
- Grand Prix de France Henri Deglane 2021
- 2021 Poland Open
