= 2023 U23 World Wrestling Championships – Men's Greco-Roman 72 kg =

Wrestling competitions

Men's Greco-Roman 72 kg at the 2023 U23 World Championships
- Venue: Tirana Olympic Park
- Dates: 27–28 October
- Competitors: 25 from 22 nations

Medalists
gold medal	Dmitrii Adamov	Authorised Neutral Athletes
silver medal	Irfan Mirzoiev	Ukraine
bronze medal	Shant Khachatryan	Armenia
bronze medal	Ruslan Nurullayev	Azerbaijan

The men's Greco-Roman 72 kg is a competition featured at the 2023 U23 World Wrestling Championships, and was held in Tirana, Albania on 27 and 28 October 2023.

This freestyle wrestling competition consists of a single-elimination tournament, with a repechage used to determine the winner of two bronze medals. The two finalists face off for gold and silver medals. Each wrestler who loses to one of the two finalists moves into the repechage, culminating in a pair of bronze medal matches featuring the semifinal losers each facing the remaining repechage opponent from their half of the bracket.

== Results ==
Legend

- F — Won by fall

=== Final ===
Final
Dmitrii Adamov (ANA)	9
Irfan Mirzoiev (UKR)	3

=== Top half ===
Round of 32
Giovanni Alessio (ITA)	0
Shant Khachatryan (ARM)	8
Miru Olsson (SWE)	8
Saud Al-Subaie (KSA)	0
Otar Abuladze (GEO)	9
Muhammed Ali Göçmen (TUR)	0
Justus Scott (USA)	0
Júnior Benítez (ESP)	6
Dmitrii Adamov (ANA)	9
Adilkhan Nurlanbekov (KGZ)	0

Round of 16
Yerassyl Nurbossynov (KAZ)	0
Shant Khachatryan (ARM)	10
Miru Olsson (SWE)	9
Otar Abuladze (GEO)	10
Yanis Nifri (FRA)	1
Júnior Benítez (ESP)	5
Dmitrii Adamov (ANA)	8
Klodjan Shehu (ALB)	0

Quarterfinals
Shant Khachatryan (ARM)	3^{F}
Otar Abuladze (GEO)	3
Júnior Benítez (ESP)	0
Dmitrii Adamov (ANA)	8

Semifinals
Shant Khachatryan (ARM)	6
Dmitrii Adamov (ANA)	15

=== Bottom half ===
Round of 32
Ruslan Nurullayev (AZE)	8
Alexis Vargas (MEX)	0
Irfan Mirzoiev (UKR)	15
Krisztofer Klányi (HUN)	7
Luka Malobabić (CRO)	2
Michael Portmann (SUI)	12
Anil Dahiya (UWW)	9^{F}
Joni Komppa (FIN)	0

Round of 16
Georgios Sotiriadis (GRE)	0
Ruslan Nurullayev (AZE)	9
Irfan Mirzoiev (UKR)	9
Piotr Stolarczyk (POL)	1
Eimantas Vilimas (LTU)	1
Michael Portmann (SUI)	6
Anil Dahiya (UWW)	2
Tetsuto Kanuka (JPN)	10

Quarterfinals
Ruslan Nurullayev (AZE)	1
Irfan Mirzoiev (UKR)	3
Michael Portmann (SUI)	9
Tetsuto Kanuka (JPN)	0

Semifinals
Irfan Mirzoiev (UKR)	9
Michael Portmann (SUI)	2

=== Repechage ===
Repechage round 1
Adilkhan Nurlanbekov (KGZ)	6
Klodjan Shehu (ALB)	0
Krisztofer Klányi (HUN)	3
Piotr Stolarczyk (POL)	0

Repechage round 2
Adilkhan Nurlanbekov (KGZ)	7
Júnior Benítez (ESP)	0
Krisztofer Klányi (HUN)	1
Ruslan Nurullayev (AZE)	2

Bronze medals
Adilkhan Nurlanbekov (KGZ)	0
Shant Khachatryan (ARM)	9^{F}
Ruslan Nurullayev (AZE)	3
Michael Portmann (SUI)	1
