= 2022 European Wrestling Championships – Men's Greco-Roman 72 kg =

Wrestling competition

Men's Greco-Roman 72 kg at the 2022 European Wrestling Championships
- Venue: BOK Sports Hall
- Location: Budapest, Hungary
- Dates: 2-3 April
- Competitors: 16

Medalists
gold medal	Róbert Fritsch	Hungary
silver medal	Shmagi Bolkvadze	Georgia
bronze medal	Ulvu Ganizade	Azerbaijan
bronze medal	Ali Arsalan	Serbia

The Men's Greco-Roman 72 kg is a competition featured at the 2022 European Wrestling Championships, and was held in Budapest, Hungary on April 2 and 3.

== Results ==
Legend

- F — Won by fall

=== Main Bracket ===
1/8 finals
Kristupas Šleiva (LTU)	15
Jakub Bielesz (CZE)	7
Shmagi Bolkvadze (GEO)	8
Leoš Drmola (SVK)	0
Deyvid Dimitrov (BUL)	3
Håvard Jørgensen (NOR)	1
Samuel Bellscheidt (GER)	1
Ulvu Ganizade (AZE)	5
Cengiz Arslan (TUR)	0
Ali Arsalan (SRB)	9
Róbert Fritsch (HUN)	5
Mikko Peltokangas (FIN)	3
Valentin Petic (MDA)	1
Pavel Puklavec (CRO)	3
Parviz Nasibov (UKR)	2
Gevorg Sahakyan (POL)	7

Quarterfinals
Kristupas Šleiva (LTU)	2
Shmagi Bolkvadze (GEO)	5
Deyvid Dimitrov (BUL)	5
Ulvu Ganizade (AZE)	13
Ali Arsalan (SRB)	4
Róbert Fritsch (HUN)	5
Pavel Puklavec (CRO)	10
Gevorg Sahakyan (POL)	0

Semifinals
Shmagi Bolkvadze (GEO)	4
Ulvu Ganizade (AZE)	1
Róbert Fritsch (HUN)	1
Pavel Puklavec (CRO)	1

Final
Shmagi Bolkvadze (GEO)	2
Róbert Fritsch (HUN)	3

=== Repechage ===
Repechage round 1
Leoš Drmola (SVK)	0
Kristupas Šleiva (LTU)	8
Mikko Peltokangas (FIN)	0
Ali Arsalan (SRB)	10

Bronze medal match
Kristupas Šleiva (LTU)	7
Ulvu Ganizade (AZE)	14
Ali Arsalan (SRB)	6^{F}
Pavel Puklavec (CRO)	1

== Final standing ==
Rank	Athlete	UWW Points
1st place, gold medalist(s)	Róbert Fritsch (HUN)	13000
2nd place, silver medalist(s)	Shmagi Bolkvadze (GEO)	11000
3rd place, bronze medalist(s)	Ulvu Ganizade (AZE)	9500
3rd place, bronze medalist(s)	Ali Arsalan (SRB)	9500
5	Kristupas Šleiva (LTU)	8000
5	Pavel Puklavec (CRO)	8000
7	Deyvid Dimitrov (BUL)	7400
8	Gevorg Sahakyan (POL)	7000
9	Jakub Bielesz (CZE)	6500
10	Mikko Peltokangas (FIN)	6100
11	Parviz Nasibov (UKR)	4000
12	Håvard Jørgensen (NOR)	3800
13	Valentin Petic (MDA)	3600
14	Samuel Bellscheidt (GER)	3400
15	Cengiz Arslan (TUR)	3200
16	Leoš Drmola (SVK)	3100
