= Luisa Niemesch =

German freestyle wrestler

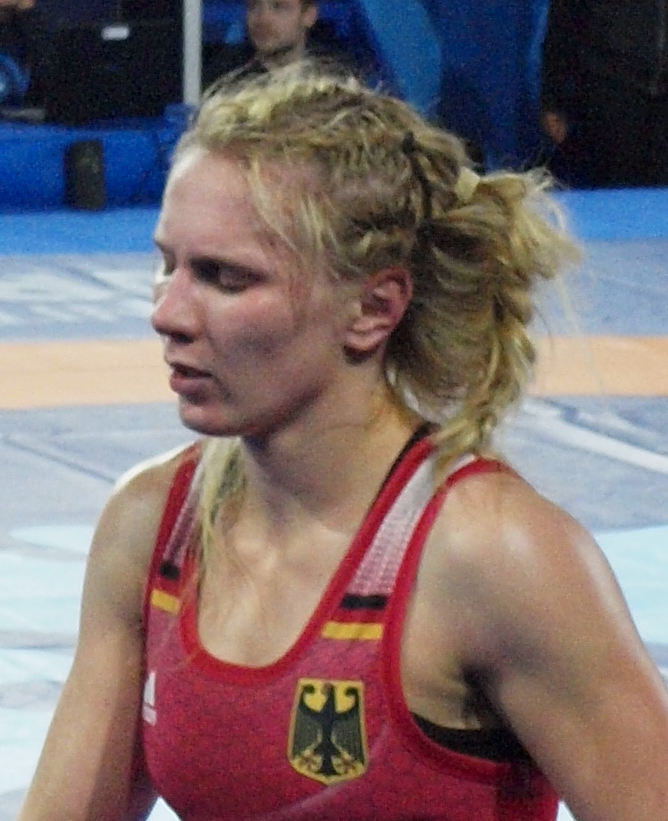
- Niemesch in 2021

Personal information
- Full name: Luisa Helga Gerda Niemesch
- Nationality: German
- Born: 7 September 1995 (age 30) Karlsruhe, Germany
- Height: 1.65 m (5 ft 5 in)
- Weight: 63 kg (139 lb)

Sport
- Country: Germany
- Sport: Freestyle wrestling
Medal record
Women's freestyle wrestling
Representing Germany
European Championships
Silver medal – second place	2022 Budapest	62 kg
Silver medal – second place	2024 Bucharest	62 kg
Bronze medal – third place	2023 Zagreb	62 kg
Bronze medal – third place	2025 Bratislava	62 kg
World U23 Championships
Bronze medal – third place	2018 Bucharest	62 kg

Luisa Helga Gerda Niemesch (born 7 September 1995) is a German freestyle wrestler. At the 2016 Summer Olympics in Rio de Janeiro, she competed in the women's freestyle 58 kg division. She finished in 20th place after losing to Pürevdorjiin Orkhon of Mongolia in the repechage.

== Career ==
In March 2021, Niemesch competed at the European Qualification Tournament in Budapest, Hungary hoping to qualify for the 2020 Summer Olympics in Tokyo, Japan. She did not qualify at this tournament and she also failed to qualify for the Olympics at the World Olympic Qualification Tournament held in Sofia, Bulgaria. In October 2021, she competed in the 62 kg event at the World Wrestling Championships held in Oslo, Norway.

In 2022, Niemesch competed at the Yasar Dogu Tournament held in Istanbul, Turkey. She won the silver medal in the 62 kg event at the 2022 European Wrestling Championships held in Budapest, Hungary. A few months later, she competed at the Matteo Pellicone Ranking Series 2022 held in Rome, Italy. She won the gold medal in her event at the 2022 Tunis Ranking Series event held in Tunis, Tunisia. She competed in the 62 kg event at the 2022 World Wrestling Championships held in Belgrade, Serbia.

Niemesch won one of the bronze medals in her event at the 2023 Ibrahim Moustafa Tournament held in Alexandria, Egypt. She won one of the bronze medals in the 62 kg event at the 2023 European Wrestling Championships held in Zagreb, Croatia.

Niemesch won the silver medal in the 62 kg event at the 2024 European Wrestling Championships held in Bucharest, Romania. She competed in the women's 62 kg event at the 2024 Summer Olympics in Paris, France. She was eliminated in her second match by Grace Bullen of Norway.

== Achievements ==
Year	Tournament	Location	Result	Event
2022	European Championships	Budapest, Hungary	2nd	Freestyle 62 kg
2023	European Championships	Zagreb, Croatia	3rd	Freestyle 62 kg
2024	European Championships	Bucharest, Romania	2nd	Freestyle 62 kg
2025	European Championships	Bratislava, Slovakia	3rd	Freestyle 62 kg
