= 2024 World Wrestling Championships – Men's Greco-Roman 72 kg =

Wrestling competitions

Men's Greco-Roman 72 kg at the 2024 World Championships
- Venue: Tirana Olympic Park
- Dates: 28–29 October 2024
- Competitors: 28 from 26 nations

Medalists
gold medal	Ulvu Ganizade	Azerbaijan
silver medal	Ibrahim Ghanem	France
bronze medal	Ali Arsalan	Serbia
bronze medal	Otar Abuladze	Georgia

The men's Greco-Roman 72 kilograms is a competition featured at the 2024 World Wrestling Championships, and was held in Tirana Olympic Park, Tirana, Albania on 28 and 29 October 2024.

This Greco-Roman wrestling competition consists of a single-elimination tournament, with a repechage used to determine the winner of two bronze medals. The two finalists face off for gold and silver medals. Each wrestler who loses to one of the two finalists moves into the repechage, culminating in a pair of bronze medal matches, featuring the semifinal losers each facing the remaining repechage opponent from their half of the bracket.

Each bout consists of a single round within a six-minute limit, including two halves of three minutes. The wrestler who scores more points is the winner.

== Results ==
Legend

- F — Won by fall

=== Final ===
Final
Ibrahim Ghanem (FRA)	2
Ulvu Ganizade (AZE)	3

=== Top half ===
Round of 32
Hayk Melikyan (ARM)	8
Meirzhan Shermakhanbet (KAZ)	0
Yryskeldi Khamzaev (KGZ)	1
Abdullo Aliev (UZB)	2
Mihai Petic (MDA)	8
Ahmed Barahmah (KSA)	0
Michael Widmayer (GER)	1
Ankit Gulia (IND)	1
Ivo Iliev (BUL)	1
Mikita Murashka (AIN)	10
Mikko Peltokangas (FIN)	5^{F}
Andreas Vetsch (SUI)	0

Round of 16
Ibrahim Ghanem (FRA)	10
Hayk Melikyan (ARM)	2
Abdullo Aliev (UZB)	7
Mihai Petic (MDA)	2
Michael Widmayer (GER)	8
Mikita Murashka (AIN)	0
Mikko Peltokangas (FIN)	1
Ali Arsalan (SRB)	10

Quarterfinals
Ibrahim Ghanem (FRA)	6
Abdullo Aliev (UZB)	0
Michael Widmayer (GER)	0
Ali Arsalan (SRB)	9

Semifinals
Ibrahim Ghanem (FRA)	6
Ali Arsalan (SRB)	1

=== Bottom half ===
Round of 32
Otar Abuladze (GEO)	4
Amadeusz Vitek (HUN)	1
Mohammad Reza Geraei (IRI)	3
Benji Peak (USA)	11
Mateusz Bernatek (POL)	1
Dominik Etlinger (CRO)	9
Håvard Jørgensen (NOR)	1
Leng Ji (CHN)	3
Aslan Visaitov (AIN)	3
Ihor Bychkov (UKR)	1
Kensuke Shimizu (JPN)	8
Gjete Prenga (ALB)	0

Round of 16
Ulvu Ganizade (AZE)	5
Otar Abuladze (GEO)	1
Benji Peak (USA)	0
Dominik Etlinger (CRO)	9
Leng Ji (CHN)	5
Aslan Visaitov (AIN)	3
Kensuke Shimizu (JPN)	1
Selçuk Can (TUR)	5

Quarterfinals
Ulvu Ganizade (AZE)	9
Dominik Etlinger (CRO)	0
Leng Ji (CHN)	3
Selçuk Can (TUR)	1

Semifinals
Ulvu Ganizade (AZE)	6
Leng Ji (CHN)	0

=== Repechage ===
Repechage round 2
Hayk Melikyan (ARM)	9
Abdullo Aliev (UZB)	0
Otar Abuladze (GEO)	7
Dominik Etlinger (CRO)	1

Bronze medals
Hayk Melikyan (ARM)	14
Ali Arsalan (SRB)	16
Otar Abuladze (GEO)	9
Leng Ji (CHN)	5

== Final standing ==
Rank	Athlete
1st place, gold medalist(s)	Ulvu Ganizade (AZE)
2nd place, silver medalist(s)	Ibrahim Ghanem (FRA)
3rd place, bronze medalist(s)	Ali Arsalan (SRB)
3rd place, bronze medalist(s)	Otar Abuladze (GEO)
5	Hayk Melikyan (ARM)
5	Leng Ji (CHN)
7	Dominik Etlinger (CRO)
8	Michael Widmayer (GER)
9	Mikko Peltokangas (FIN)
10	Abdullo Aliev (UZB)
11	Mihai Petic (MDA)
12	Kensuke Shimizu (JPN)
13	Benji Peak (USA)
14	Mikita Murashka (AIN)
15	Selçuk Can (TUR)
16	Aslan Visaitov (AIN)
17	Mohammad Reza Geraei (IRI)
18	Ankit Gulia (IND)
19	Yryskeldi Khamzaev (KGZ)
20	Håvard Jørgensen (NOR)
21	Ihor Bychkov (UKR)
22	Amadeusz Vitek (HUN)
23	Mateusz Bernatek (POL)
24	Ivo Iliev (BUL)
25	Andreas Vetsch (SUI)
26	Ahmed Barahmah (KSA)
27	Meirzhan Shermakhanbet (KAZ)
28	Gjete Prenga (ALB)
