= Otar Abuladze =

Georgian Greco-Roman wrestler

Personal information
- Born: 1 January 2000 (age 26) Georgia
- Height: 1.76 m (5 ft 9 in)
- Weight: 72 kg (159 lb; 11.3 st)

Sport
- Country: Georgia
- Sport: Greco-Roman
- Event: 72 kg
Medal record
Men's Greco-Roman wrestling
Representing Georgia
World Championships
| Bronze medal – third place | 2024 Tirana | 72 kg |
Vehbi Emre & Hamit Kaplan Tournament
| Silver medal – second place | 2024 Antalya | 72 kg |
Dan Kolov & Nikola Petrov Tournament
| Bronze medal – third place | 2021 Plovdiv | 72 kg |
Grand Prix
| Silver medal – second place | 2024 Nice | 72 kg |
| Silver medal – second place | 2023 Bucharest | 72 kg |
| Silver medal – second place | 2023 Alexandria | 72 kg |
| Bronze medal – third place | 2023 Bishkek | 72 kg |
| Bronze medal – third place | 2025 Budapest | 72 kg |
World Cadets Championships
| Bronze medal – third place | 2017 Athens | 63 kg |
European Cadets Championships
| Bronze medal – third place | Sarajevo | 63 kg |

Otar Abuladze (born 2000) is a Georgian Greco-Roman competing in the 72 kg division.

== Career ==
He won a bronze medal by defeating China's Leng Ji 9–5 in the third place match of the men's greco-dominant 72 kg in the 2024 World Wrestling Championships held in Tirana, Albania.
