= 2023 European Wrestling Championships – Women's freestyle 62 kg =

Wrestling competition

Women's freestyle 62 kg at the 2023 European Wrestling Championships
- Venue: Arena Zagreb
- Location: Zagreb, Croatia
- Dates: 20-21 April
- Competitors: 14

Medalists
gold medal	Iryna Koliadenko	Ukraine
silver medal	Grace Bullen	Norway
bronze medal	Luisa Niemesch	Germany
bronze medal	Bilyana Dudova	Bulgaria

The women's freestyle 62 kg is a competition featured at the 2023 European Wrestling Championships, and will held in Zagreb, Croatia on April 20 and 21.

== Results ==
Legend

- F — Won by fall

Round of 16
Viktoria Vesso (EST)	7^{F}
Birgul Soltanova (AZE)	1
Iryna Koliadenko (UKR)	10
Mariana Cherdivara (MDA)	0
Améline Douarre (FRA)	2
Luisa Niemesch (GER)	6
Grace Bullen (NOR)	10
Selvi İlyasoğlu (TUR)	0
Lydia Pérez (ESP)	1
Roxana Capezan (ROU)	4
Magdalena Głodek (POL)	2^{F}
Elena Esposito (ITA)	2

Quarterfinals
Johanna Lindborg (SWE)	3
Viktoria Vesso (EST)	1
Iryna Koliadenko (UKR)	10
Luisa Niemesch (GER)	0
Grace Bullen (NOR)	10
Roxana Capezan (ROU)	0
Magdalena Głodek (POL)	0
Bilyana Dudova (BUL)	10

Semifinals
Johanna Lindborg (SWE)	0
Iryna Koliadenko (UKR)	10
Grace Bullen (NOR)	7
Bilyana Dudova (BUL)	6

Final
Iryna Koliadenko (UKR)	9^{F}
Grace Bullen (NOR)	6

Repechage round 1
Mariana Cherdivara (MDA)	1
Luisa Niemesch (GER)	3
Selvi İlyasoğlu (TUR)	7^{F}
Roxana Capezan (ROU)	0

Bronze medal match
Luisa Niemesch (GER)	8
Johanna Lindborg (SWE)	1
Selvi İlyasoğlu (TUR)	2
Bilyana Dudova (BUL)	3

== Final standing ==
Rank	Athlete
1st place, gold medalist(s)	Iryna Koliadenko (UKR)
2nd place, silver medalist(s)	Grace Bullen (NOR)
3rd place, bronze medalist(s)	Luisa Niemesch (GER)
3rd place, bronze medalist(s)	Bilyana Dudova (BUL)
5	Johanna Lindborg (SWE)
5	Selvi İlyasoğlu (TUR)
7	Viktoria Vesso (EST)
8	Magdalena Głodek (POL)
9	Roxana Capezan (ROU)
10	Améline Douarre (FRA)
11	Lydia Pérez (ESP)
12	Mariana Cherdivara (MDA)
13	Elena Esposito (ITA)
14	Birgul Soltanova (AZE)
