= 2023 World Wrestling Championships – Men's Greco-Roman 72 kg =

Wrestling competitions

Men's Greco-Roman 72 kg at the 2023 World Championships
- Venue: Štark Arena
- Dates: 22–23 September 2023
- Competitors: 24 from 22 nations

Medalists
gold medal	Ibrahim Ghanem	France
silver medal	Róbert Fritsch	Hungary
bronze medal	Selçuk Can	Turkey
bronze medal	Ali Arsalan	Serbia

The men's Greco-Roman 72 kilograms is a competition featured at the 2023 World Wrestling Championships, and was held in Belgrade, Serbia on 22 and 23 September 2023.

This freestyle wrestling competition consists of a single-elimination tournament, with a repechage used to determine the winner of two bronze medals. The two finalists face off for gold and silver medals. Each wrestler who loses to one of the two finalists moves into the repechage, culminating in a pair of bronze medal matches featuring the semifinal losers each facing the remaining repechage opponent from their half of the bracket.

== Results ==
Legend

- F — Won by fall
- R — Retired

=== Finals ===
Final
Ibrahim Ghanem (FRA)	3
Róbert Fritsch (HUN)	0

=== Top half ===
Round of 32
Shant Khachatryan (ARM)	5
Narek Oganian (AIN)	1
Abdelmalek Merabet (ALG)	1
Michael Widmayer (GER)	3
Kamil Czarnecki (POL)	7
Pat Smith (USA)	7^{F}
Stoyan Kubatov (BUL)	4
Lee Ji-yeon (KOR)	0

Round of 16
Selçuk Can (TUR)	3
Shant Khachatryan (ARM)	1
Michael Widmayer (GER)	11
Tan Jian (CHN)	5
Ibragim Magomadov (KAZ)	5
Pat Smith (USA)	1
Stoyan Kubatov (BUL)	1
Ibrahim Ghanem (FRA)	5

Quarterfinals
Selçuk Can (TUR)	4
Michael Widmayer (GER)	1
Ibragim Magomadov (KAZ)	0
Ibrahim Ghanem (FRA)	10

Semifinals
Selçuk Can (TUR)	0
Ibrahim Ghanem (FRA)	4

=== Bottom half ===
Round of 32
Artur Politaiev (UKR)	2
Danial Sohrabi (IRI)	8
Zaur Kabaloev (ITA)	1
Jamol Jumabaev (UZB)	5
Daniel Cataraga (MDA)	2
Shingo Harada (JPN)	6
Ankit Gulia (UWW)	0
Håvard Jørgensen (NOR)	4

Round of 16
Ali Arsalan (SRB)	7
Danial Sohrabi (IRI)	7
Jamol Jumabaev (UZB)	1
Róbert Fritsch (HUN)	4
Ramaz Zoidze (GEO)	0^{R}
Shingo Harada (JPN)	1
Håvard Jørgensen (NOR)	3
Ulvu Ganizade (AZE)	4

Quarterfinals
Ali Arsalan (SRB)	10
Róbert Fritsch (HUN)	13^{F}
Shingo Harada (JPN)	6
Ulvu Ganizade (AZE)	4

Semifinals
Róbert Fritsch (HUN)	3
Shingo Harada (JPN)	1

=== Repechage ===
Repechage round 2
Stoyan Kubatov (BUL)	5
Ibragim Magomadov (KAZ)	5
Jamol Jumabaev (UZB)	3
Ali Arsalan (SRB)	12

Bronze medals
Stoyan Kubatov (BUL)	1
Selçuk Can (TUR)	1
Ali Arsalan (SRB)	9
Shingo Harada (JPN)	0

== Final standing ==
Rank	Athlete
1st place, gold medalist(s)	Ibrahim Ghanem (FRA)
2nd place, silver medalist(s)	Róbert Fritsch (HUN)
3rd place, bronze medalist(s)	Selçuk Can (TUR)
3rd place, bronze medalist(s)	Ali Arsalan (SRB)
5	Stoyan Kubatov (BUL)
5	Shingo Harada (JPN)
7	Michael Widmayer (GER)
8	Pat Smith (USA)
9	Jamol Jumabaev (UZB)
10	Danial Sohrabi (IRI)
11	Ibragim Magomadov (KAZ)
12	Ulvu Ganizade (AZE)
13	Håvard Jørgensen (NOR)
14	Shant Khachatryan (ARM)
15	Tan Jian (CHN)
16	Daniel Cataraga (MDA)
17	Artur Politaiev (UKR)
18	Abdelmalek Merabet (ALG)
19	Narek Oganian (AIN)
20	Zaur Kabaloev (ITA)
21	Kamil Czarnecki (POL)
22	Ramaz Zoidze (GEO)
23	Lee Ji-yeon (KOR)
24	Ankit Gulia (UWW)
