= 2017 European Wrestling Championships – Women's freestyle 55 kg =

The women's freestyle 55 kg is a competition featured at the 2017 European Wrestling Championships and was held in Novi Sad in Serbia on May 4.

== Medalists ==
Gold	Bilyana Dudova; Bulgaria
Silver	Katsiaryna Hanchar; Belarus
Bronze	Mathilde Rivière; France
Bronze	Alyona Kolesnik; Azerbaijan

== Results ==
Legend

- F — Won by fall

=== Top half ===
Qualification
Alyona Kolesnik (AZE)	9^{F}
Bediha Gün (TUR)	2
Lenka Hocková (CZE)	3
Sandra Paruszewski (GER)	4

Quarterfinals
Alexandra Andreeva (RUS)	2
Katsiaryna Hanchar (BLR)	12
Mathilde Rivière (FRA)	7
Olena Kremzer (UKR)	5
Merima Galetin (SRB)	0
Bilyana Dudova (BUL)	10
Alyona Kolesnik (AZE)	10
Sandra Paruszewski (GER)	0

Semifinals
Katsiaryna Hanchar (BLR)	4
Mathilde Rivière (FRA)	2
Bilyana Dudova (BUL)	12
Alyona Kolesnik (AZE)	10

Final
Katsiaryna Hanchar (BLR)	3
Bilyana Dudova (BUL)	9

=== Repechage ===
Bronze medals
Alexandra Andreeva (RUS)	2
Mathilde Rivière (FRA)	4
Merima Galetin (SRB)	0
Alyona Kolesnik (AZE)	6^{F}
