= Sennik =

- Village
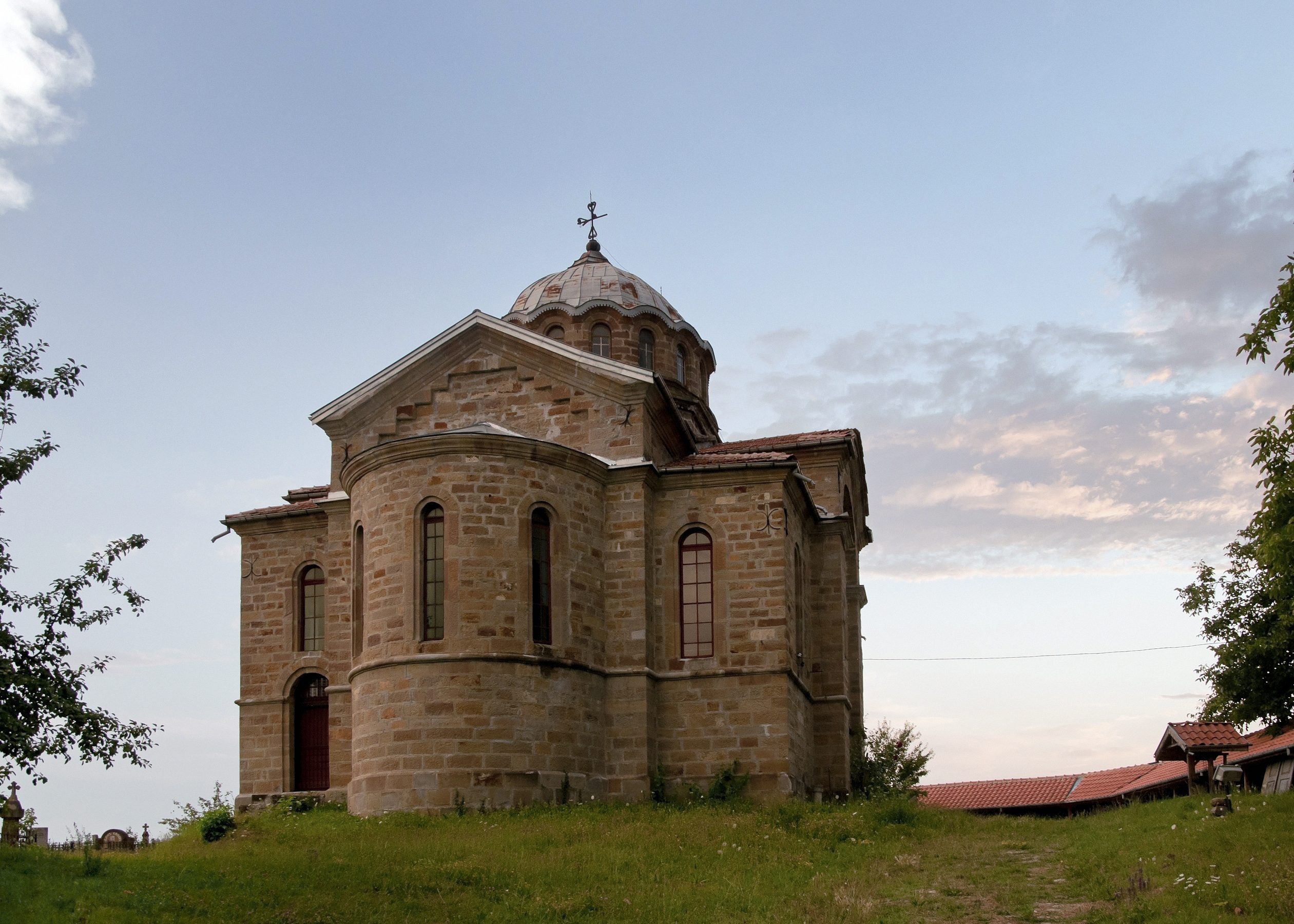
- St. John of Rila Church in Sennik.

- Location within Bulgaria
- Coordinates: 42°59′N 25°03′E
- Country: Bulgaria
- Province: Gabrovo Province
- Municipality: Sevlievo
- Time zone: UTC+2 (EET)
  - Summer (DST): UTC+3 (EEST)

Sennik is a village in the municipality of Sevlievo, in Gabrovo Province, in northern central Bulgaria.

Dan Kolov (1892–1940), a Bulgarian professional wrestler, was born and died in the village.
