= Dmitrii Adamov =

Russian Greco-Roman wrestler (born 2002)

Дмитрий Адамов Dmitrii Adamov
Personal information
- Native name: Russian: Дмитрий Сергеевич Адамов
- Full name: Dmitrii Sergeevich Adamov
- Born: 29 June 2002 (age 23) Yessentuki, Stavropol Krai, Russia
- Height: 177 cm (5 ft 10 in)

Sport
- Country: Russia
- Sport: Wrestling
- Weight class: 72 kg
- Rank: Master of sports
- Event: Greco-Roman
- Club: Olympic training center (Rostov-on-Don)
- Coached by: Ashot Zakaryan; Nadir Magomadov
Medal record
Men's Greco-Roman
Representing Individual Neutral Athletes
Vehbi Emre & Hamit Kaplan Tournament
Gold medal – first place	2024 Antalya	72 kg
U23 World Championships
Gold medal – first place	2023 Tirana	72 kg
Representing Russia
CIS Games
Gold medal – first place	2021 Kazan	72 kg
Gold medal – first place	2023 Soligorsk	72 kg

Dmitrii Sergeevich Adamov (Russian: Дмитрий Сергеевич Адамов; born 29 June 2002) is a Russian Greco-Roman wrestler who was a CIS Games gold medalist twice, as well as the 2023 U23 World Champion.

== Background ==
Adamov was born and raised in Yessentuki, Stavropol Krai, Russia. At the age of six, he moved with his family to Pyatigorsk, where he started wrestling under his first coach Vadim Margiev.

== Sport career ==
Adamov was bronze medalist of the 2021 Russian junior championships and winner of the 2021 CIS Games held in Kazan. In 2022, he finished first at the Russian junior championships in the Greco-Roman 72 kg event and third at the 2022 Karavayev Memorial. In 2023, he won the U23 Russian championships, 2023 CIS Games and U23 World Championships at 72 kilos. In April 2024, he won the U23 Russian championships.

== Achievements ==
- 2021 Russian junior championships — 3rd;
- 2021 CIS Games — 1st;
- 2022 Russian junior championships — 1st;
- 2022 Karavayev Memorial — 3rd;
- 2023, 2024 U23 Russian championships — 1st;
- 2023 CIS Games — 1st;
- 2023 U23 World Championships — 1st;
