= 2022 Dan Kolov & Nikola Petrov Tournament – Women's freestyle =

The women's freestyle competitions at the 2022 Dan Kolov & Nikola Petrov Tournament was held in Veliko Tarnovo, Bulgaria between 17 and 20 February 2022.

== Women's freestyle ==
Legend

- F — Won by fall
- WO — Won by walkover

=== Women's freestyle 50 kg ===
19–20 February

Quarterfinals		Semifinals		Final
Emilia Cîrîcu (MDA)	9^{F}
Lisa Ersel (GER)	1	Emilia Cîrîcu (MDA)	2
Neelam Sirohi (IND)	12^{F}	Neelam Sirohi (IND)	6
Emma Luttenauer (FRA)	2			Neelam Sirohi (IND)	2
Miglena Selishka (BUL)	5			Miglena Selishka (BUL)	9^{F}
Julie Sabatié (FRA)	3	Miglena Selishka (BUL)	6^{F}
Ştefania Priceputu (ROU)	15	Ştefania Priceputu (ROU)	0
Anastasiya Yanotava (BLR)	14

Bronze medals
Emma Luttenauer (FRA)	3
Emilia Cîrîcu (MDA)	9
Julie Sabatié (FRA)	WO
Ştefania Priceputu (ROU)

=== Women's freestyle 53 kg ===
19–20 February

Round of 32
	Score	
Denisa Fodor (ROU)	8–11	Magdalena Varbanova (BUL)
Laura Gómez (ESP)	0–6 Fall	Swati Sanjay Shinde (IND)
Tamuna Samkharadze (GEO)	2–6	Nazife Tair (BUL)
Sheetal Tomar (IND)	3–5	Mihaela Samoil (MDA)
Aintzane Gorría (ESP)	0–4 Fall	Anastasia Blayvas (GER)

Round of 16
Beatrice Ferenţ (ROU)	1
Viktoryia Volk (BLR)	5
Magdalena Varbanova (BUL)	0
Nova Bergman (SWE)	11
Tatiana Debien (FRA)	6^{F}
Swati Sanjay Shinde (IND)	0
Nazife Tair (BUL)	8
María Blanco (ESP)	0
Mariana Drăguțan (MDA)	4
Mercédesz Dénes (HUN)	6
Mihaela Samoil (MDA)	0
Maria Prevolaraki (GRE)	11^{F}
Chadia Ayachi (FRA)	1
Anastasia Blayvas (GER)	10^{F}
Alisha Howk (USA)	10
Irena Binkova (BUL)	0

Quarterfinals
Viktoryia Volk (BLR)	0
Nova Bergman (SWE)	3^{F}
Tatiana Debien (FRA)	10
Nazife Tair (BUL)	0
Mercédesz Dénes (HUN)	1
Maria Prevolaraki (GRE)	4
Anastasia Blayvas (GER)	7
Alisha Howk (USA)	2

Semifinals
Nova Bergman (SWE)	5
Tatiana Debien (FRA)	3
Maria Prevolaraki (GRE)	10
Anastasia Blayvas (GER)	0

Final
Nova Bergman (SWE)	1
Maria Prevolaraki (GRE)	4

Repechage round 2
Magdalena Varbanova (BUL)
Viktoryia Volk (BLR)	WO
Mihaela Samoil (MDA)	3
Mercédesz Dénes (HUN)	5

Bronze medal match
Viktoryia Volk (BLR)	2
Tatiana Debien (FRA)	6
Mercédesz Dénes (HUN)	4
Anastasia Blayvas (GER)	6

=== Women's freestyle 55 kg ===
17–18 February

Pos	Athlete	Pld	W	L	CP	TP	IND	BUL	USA
1	Pinki (IND)	2	2	0	8	4	—	4–1	WO
2	Sezen Belberova (BUL)	2	1	1	6	1	1–3 VPO1	—	WO
—	Sophia Mirabella (USA)	2	0	2	0	0	0–5 VFO	0–5 VFO	—

Source: UWW

Pos	Athlete	Pld	W	L	CP	TP	ROU	NOR	IND
1	Andreea Ana (ROU)	2	2	0	7	14	—	2–0	12–0
2	Othelie Høie (NOR)	2	1	1	3	12	0–3 VPO	—	2–1
3	Bhavika P. Patel (IND)	2	0	2	1	1	0–4 VSU	1–3 VPO1	—

Source: UWW

Semifinals
Pinki (IND)	5
Othelie Høie (NOR)	4
Andreea Ana (ROU)	3
Sezen Belberova (BUL)	0

Final
Pinki (IND)	1
Andreea Ana (ROU)	2
Bronze medal
Othelie Høie (NOR)	5
Sezen Belberova (BUL)	8

=== Women's freestyle 57 kg ===
19–20 February

Round of 16
Graciela Sánchez (ESP)	0
Anna Szél (HUN)	13
Jenna Hemiä (FIN)	4^{F}
Sophia Mirabella (USA)	0

Quarterfinals
Neetu Neetu (IND)	2
Anna Szél (HUN)	12
Srishti Srishti (IND)	WO
~~Saidy Chávez (HON)~~
Marina Rueda (ESP)	0
Alesia Hetmanava (BLR)	10
Jenna Hemiä (FIN)	0
Evelina Nikolova (BUL)	4^{F}

Semifinals
Anna Szél (HUN)	0
Srishti Srishti (IND)	6
Alesia Hetmanava (BLR)	1
Evelina Nikolova (BUL)	7

Final
Srishti Srishti (IND)	0
Evelina Nikolova (BUL)	8^{F}

Bronze medals
~~Saidy Chávez (HON)~~
Anna Szél (HUN)	WO
Jenna Hemiä (FIN)	2
Alesia Hetmanava (BLR)	5

=== Women's freestyle 59 kg ===
17–18 February

Pos	Athlete	Pld	W	L	CP	TP	IND	GER	BLR	FRA	BUL
1	Sanju Devi (IND)	4	3	1	15	25	—	4–0 Fall	4–9	7–1 Fall	10–0
2	Andrea Grasruck (GER)	4	3	1	12	23	0–5 VFA	—	5–2 Fall	10–0	8–6
3	Nadzeya Bulanaya (BLR)	4	3	1	11	25	3–1 VPO1	0–5 VFA	—	8–0 Fall	6–0
4	Amel Rebiha (FRA)	4	1	3	5	7	0–5 VFA	0–4 VSU	0–5 VFA	—	6–0 Fall
5	Fatme Shaban (BUL)	4	0	4	1	6	0–4 VSU	1–3 VPO1	0–3 VPO	0–5 VFA	—

Source: UWW

=== Women's freestyle 62 kg ===
18–19 February

Round of 16
Viktoria Øverby (NOR)	0
Améline Douarre (FRA)	11
Jennifer Rogers (USA)	10
Ritu Rani (IND)	0

Quarterfinals
Radhika Jaglan (IND)	11
Améline Douarre (FRA)	0
Taybe Yusein (BUL)	10
Miciel Vennström (SWE)	0
Nikolett Szabó (HUN)	0
Lydia Pérez (ESP)	10
Jennifer Rogers (USA)	5
Bilyana Dudova (BUL)	16

Semifinals
Radhika Jaglan (IND)	0
Taybe Yusein (BUL)	10
Lydia Pérez (ESP)	0
Bilyana Dudova (BUL)	11

Final
Taybe Yusein (BUL)	2
Bilyana Dudova (BUL)	7

Bronze medals
Miciel Vennström (SWE)	0^{R}
Radhika Jaglan (IND)	2
Jennifer Rogers (USA)	9
Lydia Pérez (ESP)	2

=== Women's freestyle 65 kg ===
17–18 February

Round of 16
Mallory Velte (USA)	10
Jaspreet Kaur (IND)	0
Anna Németh (HUN)	2
Sofiya Georgieva (BUL)	13

Quarterfinals
Roxana Capezan (ROU)	0
Mallory Velte (USA)	10
Viktória Felhő (HUN)	0
Elis Manolova (AZE)	2^{F}
Yauheniya Andreichykava (BLR)	2
Emma Bruntil (USA)	5
Sofiya Georgieva (BUL)	1
Bhateri (IND)	1

Semifinals
Mallory Velte (USA)	8
Elis Manolova (AZE)	0
Emma Bruntil (USA)	4
Sofiya Georgieva (BUL)	1

Final
Mallory Velte (USA)	2
Emma Bruntil (USA)	2

Repechage round 1
Jaspreet Kaur (IND)	0
Roxana Capezan (ROU)	11

Bronze medals
Roxana Capezan (ROU)	0
Elis Manolova (AZE)	4
Yauheniya Andreichykava (BLR)	4
Sofiya Georgieva (BUL)	8

=== Women's freestyle 68 kg ===
18–19 February

Quarterfinals		Semifinals		Final
Sonika Hooda (IND)	10
Lorena Lera (ESP)	0	Sonika Hooda (IND)	0
Irina Rîngaci (MDA)	12	Irina Rîngaci (MDA)	10
Noémi Szabados (HUN)	0			Irina Rîngaci (MDA)	10
Adina Irimia (ROU)	18			Pauline Lecarpentier (FRA)	7
Marta Ojeda (ESP)	8	Adina Irimia (ROU)	0
Pauline Lecarpentier (FRA)	3	Pauline Lecarpentier (FRA)	10
Siyka Ivanova (BUL)	0

Bronze medals
Noémi Szabados (HUN)	0
Sonika Hooda (IND)	2
Siyka Ivanova (BUL)	6^{F}
Adina Irimia (ROU)	2

=== Women's freestyle 72 kg ===
17 February

Round of 16
Reetika Hooda (IND)	6
Hanna Maslakova (BLR)	1

Quarterfinals
Teona Jandagashvili (GEO)	0
Reetika Hooda (IND)	10
Yuliana Yaneva (BUL)	10
Emese Elekes (HUN)	0
Larisa Nițu (ROU)	7
Daniela Brasnarova (BUL)	9
Lilly Schneider (GER)	6^{F}
Kulwinder Kaur Samrao (IND)	0

Semifinals
Reetika Hooda (IND)	0
Yuliana Yaneva (BUL)	10
Daniela Brasnarova (BUL)	1
Lilly Schneider (GER)	7

Final
Yuliana Yaneva (BUL)	10
Lilly Schneider (GER)	0

Bronze medals
Emese Elekes (HUN)	0
Reetika Hooda (IND)	7
Kulwinder Kaur Samrao (IND)	2
Daniela Brasnarova (BUL)	4

=== Women's freestyle 76 kg ===
18–19 February

Pos	Athlete	Pld	W	L	CP	TP	BUL	IND	GRE	GRE
1	Maria Oryashkova (BUL)	3	3	0	12	22	—	5–2 Fall	5–0	12–1
2	Kavita Kavita (IND)	3	2	1	7	16	0–5 VFA	—	10–0	4–0
3	Stefania Zacheila (GRE)	3	1	2	5	0	0–3 VPO	0–4 VSU	—	WO
4	Aikaterini Pitsiava (GRE)	3	0	3	1	1	1–4 VSU1	0–3 VPO	0–5 VIN	—

Source: UWW

Pos	Athlete	Pld	W	L	CP	TP	NOR	BUL	ESP
1	Marion Bye (NOR)	2	2	0	6	14	—	9–6	5–4
2	Vanesa Kaloyanova (BUL)	2	1	1	4	16	1–3 VPO1	—	10–6
3	Carla Lera (ESP)	2	0	2	2	10	1–3 VPO1	1–3 VPO1	—

Source: UWW

Semifinals
Maria Oryashkova (BUL)	10^{F}
Vanesa Kaloyanova (BUL)	1
Marion Bye (NOR)	0
Kavita Kavita (IND)	10

Final
Maria Oryashkova (BUL)	12
Kavita Kavita (IND)	2
Bronze medal
Vanesa Kaloyanova (BUL)	1
Marion Bye (NOR)	4^{F}

== See also ==
- 2022 Dan Kolov & Nikola Petrov Tournament
