= 2024 European Wrestling Championships – Women's freestyle 62 kg =

Wrestling competition

Women's freestyle 62 kg at the 2024 European Wrestling Championships
- Venue: Polyvalent Hall
- Location: Bucharest, Romania
- Dates: 15-16 February
- Competitors: 16

Medalists
| gold medal | Grace Bullen | Norway |
| silver medal | Luisa Niemesch | Germany |
| bronze medal | Veranika Ivanova | Individual Neutral Athletes |
| bronze medal | Yuliya Tkach | Ukraine |

The women's freestyle 62 kg is a competition featured at the 2024 European Wrestling Championships, and held in Bucharest, Romania on February 15 and 16.

== Results ==
Legend

- F — Won by fall

=== Main bracket ===
Round of 16
Grace Bullen (NOR) | 14^{F}
Birgül Soltanova (AZE) | 5
Roxana Capezan (ROU) | 13
Viktoria Vesso (EST) | 3
Veranika Ivanova (AIN) | 9^{F}
Elena Esposito (ITA) | 0
Sevil Nazarova (AIN) | 2
Mariana Cherdivara (MDA) | 8
Luisa Niemesch (GER) | 11
Aleksandra Wólczyńska (POL) | 0
Ebru Dağbaşı (TUR) | 0
Yuliya Tkach (UKR) | 11
Johanna Lindborg (SWE) | 11
Lydia Pérez (ESP) | 2
Iris Thiébaux (FRA) | 0
Bilyana Dudova (BUL) | 4

Quarterfinals
Grace Bullen (NOR) | 12^{F}
Roxana Capezan (ROU) | 2
Veranika Ivanova (AIN) | 5
Mariana Cherdivara (MDA) | 2
Luisa Niemesch (GER) | 7
Yuliya Tkach (UKR) | 1
Johanna Lindborg (SWE) | 3
Bilyana Dudova (BUL) | 2

Semifinals
Grace Bullen (NOR) | 6^{F}
Veranika Ivanova (AIN) | 3
Luisa Niemesch (GER) | 4
Johanna Lindborg (SWE) | 2

Final
Grace Bullen (NOR) | 5
Luisa Niemesch (GER) | 4

=== Repechage ===
Repechage round 1
Birgül Soltanova (AZE) | 6
Roxana Capezan (ROU) | 0
Aleksandra Wólczyńska (POL) | 0
Yuliya Tkach (UKR) | 2^{F}

Bronze medal match
Birgül Soltanova (AZE) | 6
Veranika Ivanova (AIN) | 9
Yuliya Tkach (UKR) | 8
Johanna Lindborg (SWE) | 6

== Final standing ==
| Rank | Athlete |
|---|---|
| 1st place, gold medalist(s) | Grace Bullen (NOR) |
| 2nd place, silver medalist(s) | Luisa Niemesch (GER) |
| 3rd place, bronze medalist(s) | Veranika Ivanova (AIN) |
| 3rd place, bronze medalist(s) | Yuliya Tkach (UKR) |
| 5 | Birgül Soltanova (AZE) |
| 5 | Johanna Lindborg (SWE) |
| 7 | Roxana Capezan (ROU) |
| 8 | Mariana Cherdivara (MDA) |
| 9 | Bilyana Dudova (BUL) |
| 10 | Viktoria Vesso (EST) |
| 11 | Sevil Nazarova (AIN) |
| 12 | Lydia Pérez (ESP) |
| 13 | Iris Thiébaux (FRA) |
| 14 | Elena Esposito (ITA) |
| 15 | Ebru Dağbaşı (TUR) |
| 16 | Aleksandra Wólczyńska (POL) |
