= 2025 European Wrestling Championships – Women's freestyle 62 kg =

Wrestling competition

Women's freestyle 62 kg at the 2025 European Wrestling Championships
- Venue: X-Bionic Sphere
- Location: Bratislava, Slovakia
- Dates: 10-11 April
- Competitors: 16

Medalists
| gold medal | Iryna Bondar | Ukraine |
| silver medal | Johanna Lindborg | Sweden |
| bronze medal | Bilyana Dudova | Bulgaria |
| bronze medal | Luisa Niemesch | Germany |

The women's freestyle 62 kg is a competition featured at the 2025 European Wrestling Championships, and was held in Bratislava, Slovakia on April 10 and 11.

== Results ==
Legend

- F — Won by fall

=== Main bracket ===
Round of 16
Bilyana Dudova (BUL) | 3
Lydia Pérez (ESP) | 0
Nikolett Szabó (HUN) | 0
Iryna Bondar (UKR) | 10
Alina Kasabieva (UWW) | 10
Alicja Nowosad (POL) | 0
Veranika Ivanova (UWW) | 3
Aurora Campagna (ITA) | 0
Johanna Lindborg (SWE) | 11
Selvi İlyasoğlu (TUR) | 2
Roxana Capezan (ROU) | 10
Ineta Dantaitė (LTU) | 0
Iris Thiébaux (FRA) | 2
Nina Bodișteanu (MDA) | 5^{F}
Ruzanna Mammadova (AZE) | 1
Luisa Niemesch (GER) | 7

Quarterfinals
Bilyana Dudova (BUL) | 1
Iryna Bondar (UKR) | 8
Alina Kasabieva (UWW) | 7
Veranika Ivanova (UWW) | 2
Johanna Lindborg (SWE) | 9^{F}
Roxana Capezan (ROU) | 6
Nina Bodișteanu (MDA) | 1
Luisa Niemesch (GER) | 11

Semifinals
Iryna Bondar (UKR) | 8
Alina Kasabieva (UWW) | 4
Johanna Lindborg (SWE) | 8
Luisa Niemesch (GER) | 4

Final
Iryna Bondar (UKR) | 5^{F}
Johanna Lindborg (SWE) | 0

=== Repechage ===
Repechage round 1
Nikolett Szabó (HUN) | 1
Bilyana Dudova (BUL) | 11
Selvi İlyasoğlu (TUR) | 6
Roxana Capezan (ROU) | 2

Bronze medal match
Bilyana Dudova (BUL) | 4
Alina Kasabieva (UWW) | 3
Selvi İlyasoğlu (TUR) | 0
Luisa Niemesch (GER) | 7^{F}

== Final standing ==
| Rank | Athlete |
|---|---|
| 1st place, gold medalist(s) | Iryna Bondar (UKR) |
| 2nd place, silver medalist(s) | Johanna Lindborg (SWE) |
| 3rd place, bronze medalist(s) | Bilyana Dudova (BUL) |
| 3rd place, bronze medalist(s) | Luisa Niemesch (GER) |
| 5 | Alina Kasabieva (UWW) |
| 5 | Selvi İlyasoğlu (TUR) |
| 7 | Nina Bodișteanu (MDA) |
| 8 | Roxana Capezan (ROU) |
| 9 | Veranika Ivanova (UWW) |
| 10 | Ruzanna Mammadova (AZE) |
| 11 | Nikolett Szabó (HUN) |
| 12 | Iris Thiébaux (FRA) |
| 13 | Aurora Campagna (ITA) |
| 14 | Lydia Pérez (ESP) |
| 15 | Alicja Nowosad (POL) |
| 16 | Ineta Dantaitė (LTU) |
