= Shmagi Bolkvadze =

Georgian Greco-Roman wrestler

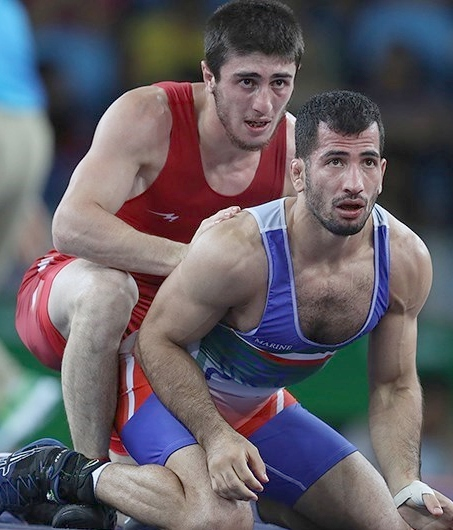
- Bolkvadze (left) at the 2016 Olympics

Personal information
- Full name: Shmagi Bolkvadze
- Nationality: Georgia
- Born: July 26, 1994 (age 31) Khulo, Georgia
- Education: Georgian Technical University
- Height: 1.70 m (5 ft 7 in)
- Weight: 66 kg (146 lb)

Sport
- Sport: Wrestling
- Event: Greco-Roman
Medal record
Representing Georgia
Olympic Games
Bronze medal – third place	2016 Rio de Janeiro	66 kg
European Games
Silver medal – second place	2019 Minsk	67 kg
European Championships
Gold medal – first place	2021 Warsaw	72 kg
Silver medal – second place	2018 Kaspiysk	67 kg
Silver medal – second place	2022 Budapest	72 kg
Bronze medal – third place	2016 Riga	66 kg

Shmagi Bolkvadze (Georgian: შმაგი ბოლქვაძე; born July 26, 1994) is a Greco-Roman wrestler from Georgia. In 2016 he won bronze medals at the European championships and Rio Olympics.
