= Ljubomir Ivanović Gedža =

Serbian and Yugoslav wrestler (1925–1980)

Personal information
- Full name: Ljubomir Ivanović
- Nickname: Gedža
- Born: 25 December 1925 Kovačevac, Kingdom of Serbs, Croats and Slovenes
- Died: 2 December 1980 (aged 54) Beograd, SFR Yugoslavia

Sport
- Sport: Greco-Roman wrestling
- Club: Rvački klub Mladenovac; Rvački klub Beograd

Ljubomir Ivanović Gedža (Serbian: Љубомир Ивановић Геџа; 25 December 1925 – 2 December 1980) was a Yugoslav and Serbian wrestler and a wrestling coach.

A memorial wrestling tournament is being held in his honor in Mladenovac. Ljubomir Ivanović Gedža was very successful as a coach, which is evidenced by the fact that wrestlers under his leadership won a total of 55 medals in the biggest competitions (Olympic Games, World Championships and European Championships).

== Literature ==
- Stanković, Nebojša; Sokić, Snežana Nena. Prvi. Sportski savez Mladenovca.
