= Dan Kolov =

Bulgarian professional wrestler (1892–1940)

Personal information
- Born: Doncho Kolev Danev; 26 December 1892 Sennik, Sevlievo, Bulgaria
- Died: 27 March 1940 (aged 47) Sennik, Sevlievo, Bulgaria

Professional wrestling career
- Ring name(s): Dan Kolman; Dan Koloff; Dan Kolov; Date Petroff; Donecho Koley
- Billed height: 5 ft 7 in (1.70 m)
- Billed weight: 231 lb (105 kg)
- Trained by: Zbyszko Cyganiewicz
- Debut: 1914
- Retired: 1937

Doncho Kolev Danev (Bulgarian: Дончо Колев Данев) (26 December 1892 – 27 March 1940), better known by the ring name Dan Kolov (Bulgarian: Дан Колов), was a Bulgarian professional wrestler born in Sennik, Bulgaria who was the first European freestyle wrestling champion from Bulgaria. He is also famously known for rejecting the offer to become a bodyguard for one of the most powerful mobsters in history Al Capone.

Kolov won the European gold in 1936 in the championship in Paris, which was the second distinction for Bulgaria after the world title of Nikola Petrov (Greco-Roman wrestling) from 1900. He was inducted in the Wrestling Observer Newsletter Hall of Fame in 2020.

== Early years ==
Doncho Kolev Danev was born on 27 December 1892 in the village of Sennik, Sevlievo municipality. He was seven years old when his father died. This tragic event forced him to become a shepherd in order to survive. He left Bulgaria in 1905 and went to then Austro-Hungarian Empire. In 1909, he met with another Bulgarian wrestler, Nikola Petrov, who convinced him to emigrate to the United States.

== Professional wrestling and martial arts career ==
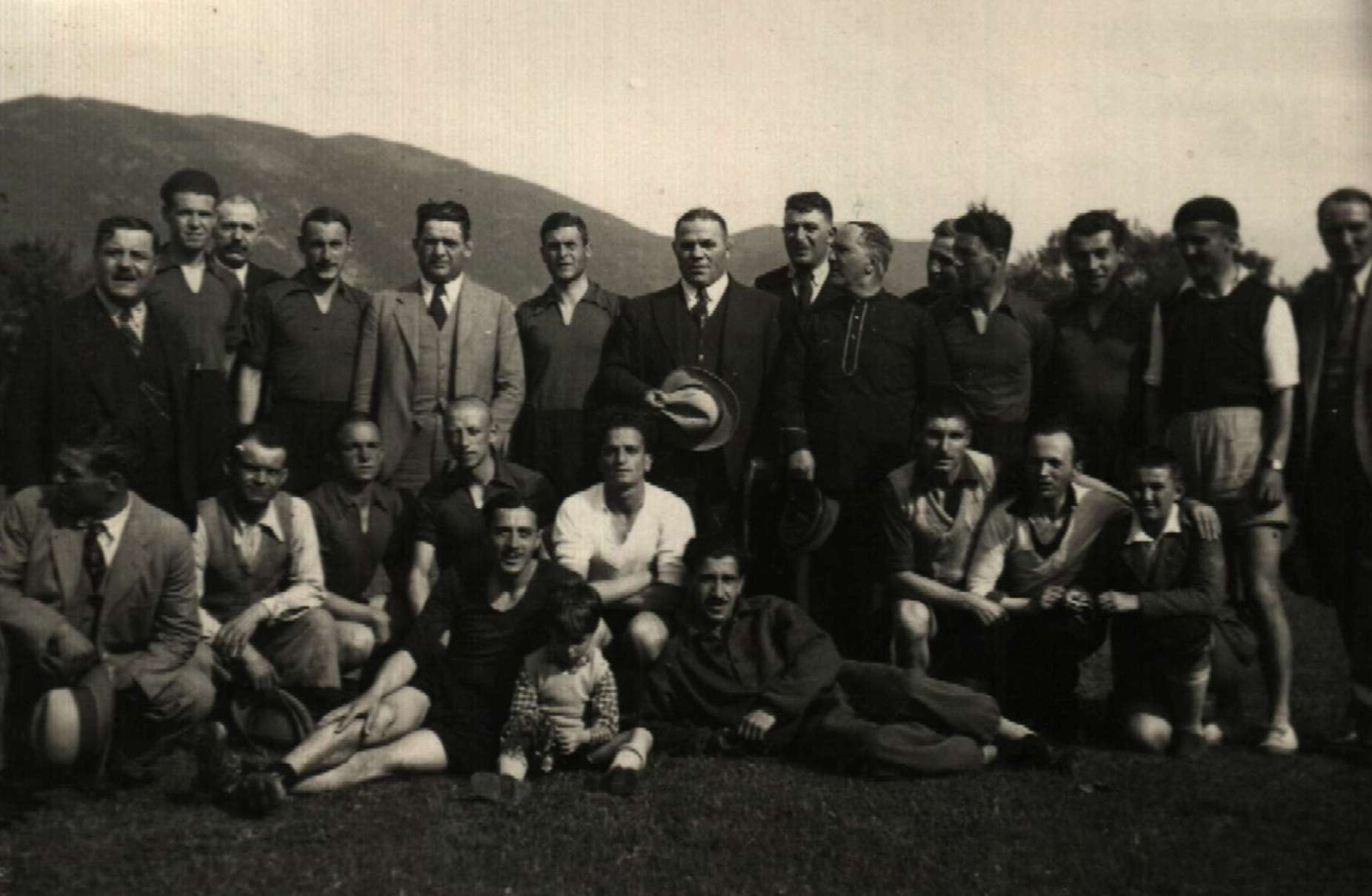
Group photo with Kolov (who is standing right in the center)

Kolov left Bulgaria and moved to the United States at the age of 13. He worked various jobs until he found work as a railroad construction worker. He impressed people with his physical power and became famous for his ability to twist metal rails around his neck. He even fought a bear while hunting. Legend has it that he fought the beast for an hour with his bare hands until he got a chance to kill the animal with his rifle later. Apparently, witnesses saw the marks of Kolov's hands on the neck of the bear. He was subsequently hired as a wrestler with "Victoria Circus".

Before being discovered and trained to be a professional wrestler by Zbyszko Cyganiewicz, Kolov was self-taught. Kolov was the first wrestler who captured the world championship's "Diamond Belt" twice. His most famous victories are: in New York vs. Rudy Dusek (1919), in Tokyo vs. Jiki Higen "The Strangler" (1921) and in Paris vs. Henri Deglane (1933). He was also three times European Heavyweight Champion (1934, 1937, 1937). In 1937, Kolov defeated then European Heavyweight Champion, American Al Pereira, only for Pereira to win the title back and for Kolov to reclaim it, before losing it in turn to Joe Savoldi.

Kolov started his career as a wrestler by taking part in the organised wrestling matches between the workers. He later won the tournament in the circus "Victoria" in 1914, when the director of the circus invited people from the public to compete and check their physical power with the star Jeff Lawrence "The Cyclope". Kolov accepted the challenge and he succeeded in overpowering the 233 pound wrestler. He won against many famous wrestlers from that time such as Jeff Lawrence, Stanislaus Zbyszko, Jack Shirey (also called "The Lightning Man"), Rudy Dusek, Jo Stecker, Ed "Strangler" Lewis, and Jim Browning.

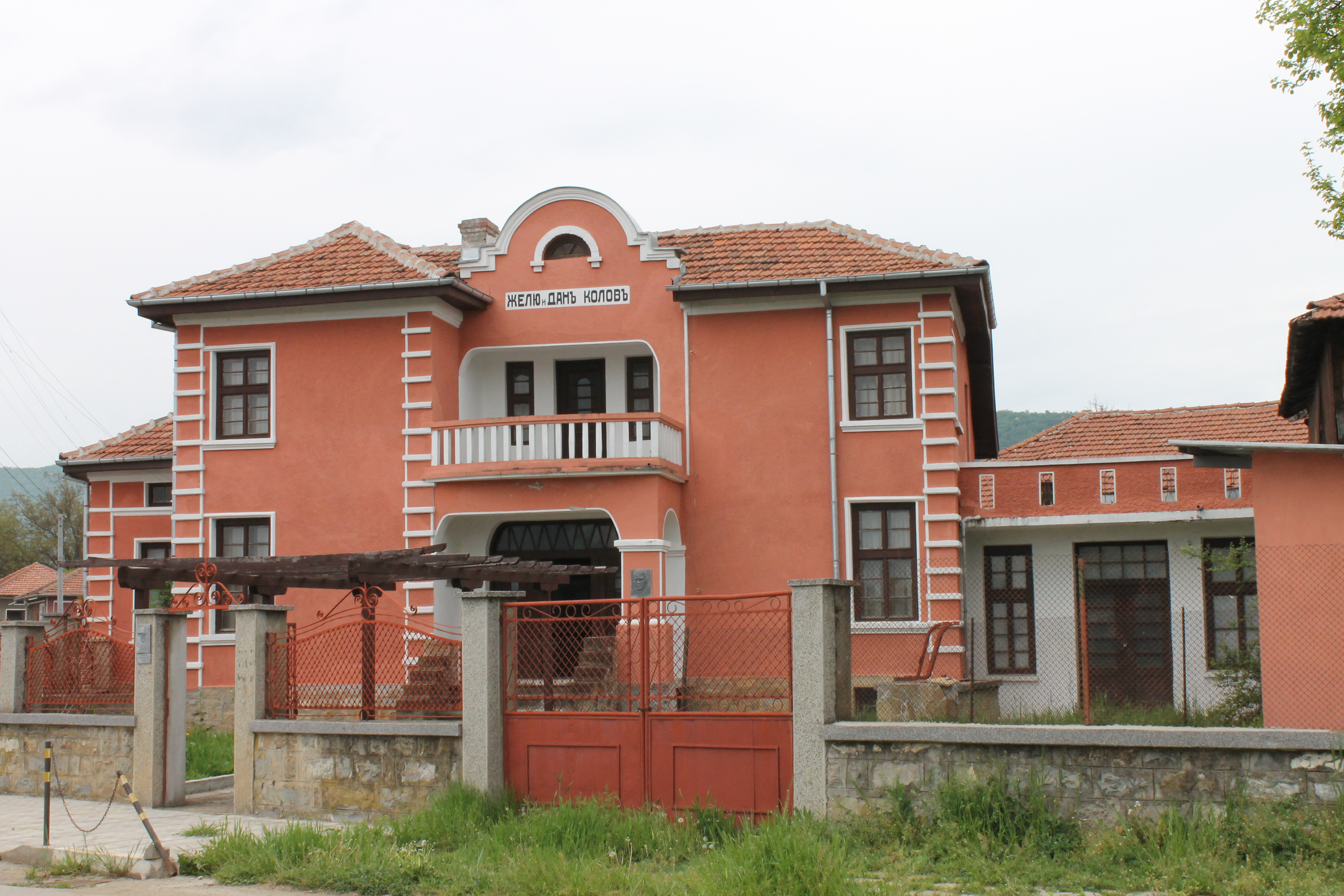
Kolov's house in Sennik, his home village

=== Wins ===
Kolov had over 1,500 official matches. His wins include:

- 2 times Diamond Belt World Heavyweight Champion (1927, 1933)
- 3 times European Heavyweight Champion (1934, 1937, 1937/1938)
- 1 time tournament winner in Japan (1924)
- 1 time tournament winner in Brazil (1927)
- multiple winner of tournaments in the United States (1914/1927)

=== Losses ===
Kolov has 94 registered losses in official matches.

== Return to Bulgaria ==
After 30 years in a foreign country, he came back to Bulgaria and was greeted as a national hero. Throughout his whole career, he was asked many times to change his citizenship to American. He refused it with the words: "Dan Kolov is Bulgarian". Kolov remained proud Bulgarian until his death and was famous for his words: "I feel strong, because I am Bulgarian". For him, his motherland was the most holy and sacred thing. He is remembered for helping many Bulgarian people in the country and abroad. He gave all of his money to charities. The first Bulgarian airplane for the National Bulgarian Post was donated by him.

Having returned home, Kolov spent most of his time establishing wrestling clubs by training young people, but continued to compete professionally until the last years of his life. He also arranged many wrestling matches in Sofia and donated all the profits. He is also famous with another saying, upon his return to Bulgaria, he was asked if he wanted someone to take him home by carriage, to which he replied: "I left home walking, I will go home walking!" After 9 September 1944, the new Communist government awarded him with the high accolade "Honoured Master of Sport" posthumously. In 1962, the Bulgarian Wrestling Federation organised an international freestyle wrestling tournament named after him to commemorate his memory. In 1999, it was produced a movie about his life titled Dan Koloff – The King of Wrestling.

== Death ==
Kolov died in Bulgaria on 27 March 1940 from tuberculosis. One of the versions for his condition is that he did not get infected naturally, but that he was purposely infected by French doctors. It is known that there were a lot of attempts to get Kolov disgraced and disqualified from tournaments. His coffin was carried by officers of the Ninth Artillery Corps from the town of Sevlievo also escorted by an honorary company of cavalry. He was buried with the specific request of facing the Balkan ("Balkan against Balkan"). Each year, in the town of Sevlievo a freestyle wrestling tournament is held in memory of Kolov.

== Championship and accomplishments ==
- Wrestling Observer Newsletter
  - Wrestling Observer Hall of Fame (class of 2020)
- Other promotions
  - Diamond Belt World Heavyweight Championship (2 times)
  - European Heavyweight Championship (3 times)
  - Tournament in Brazil (1927)
  - Tournament in Japan (1924)
  - Tournaments in the United States (1914/1927)
