= Nikola Petroff =

Bulgarian wrestler

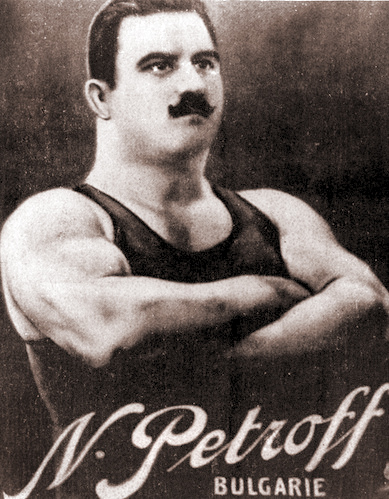
Nikola Petrov

Nikola Petrov (Bulgarian: Никола Петров), better known as Nikola Petroff, (19 December 1873 – 2 January 1925) was a Bulgarian wrestler.

He was born in the town of Gorna Oryahovitsa, Bulgaria. On 20 July 1898, in New York City, he earned the title "Champion of America". In the next year in Vienna, he became the European Champion in Greco-Roman wrestling. In 1900, during the Exposition Universelle in Paris, he defeated the Frenchman Paul Pons and became a world champion.

He fought in the First Balkan War. In 1921, he established his own private school of wrestling in Sofia. He died in 1925 and was buried in his home town of Gorna Oryahovitsa.

Since 1963, a yearly tournament in the name of Nikola Petrov has been organised in Bulgaria. In 1998, he was proclaimed an Honoured Citizen of Gorna Oryahovitsa.

In his 25-year wrestling career, he was defeated once by Marijan Matijević.
