= 2025 European Wrestling Championships – Men's Greco-Roman 72 kg =

Wrestling competition

Men's Greco-Roman 72 kg at the 2025 European Wrestling Championships
- Venue: X-Bionic Sphere
- Location: Bratislava, Slovakia
- Dates: 12-13 April
- Competitors: 20

Medalists
gold medal	Levente Lévai	Hungary
gold medal	Ibrahim Ghanem	France
bronze medal	Ulvu Ganizade	Azerbaijan
bronze medal	Mehmet Mustafa Şahin	Turkey

The men's Greco-Roman 72 kg is a competition featured at the 2025 European Wrestling Championships, and was held in Bratislava, Slovakia on April 12 and 13. In the 72 kilo category, the UWW decided to award two gold medals after the match, based on an appeal by the French delegation due to an error made by the referee supervising the result. The competition actually ended with a Hungarian victory.

== Results ==
Legend

- F — Won by fall

=== Final ===
Final
Levente Lévai (HUN)	4
Ibrahim Ghanem (FRA)	4

=== Top half ===
Round of 32
Sebastian Aak (NOR)	12
Aleksander Mielewczyk (POL)	3
Michael Portmann (SUI)	0
Iuri Lomadze (GEO)	8

Round of 16
Ulvu Ganizade (AZE)	4
Levente Lévai (HUN)	6
Sebastian Aak (NOR)	8
Alen Mirzoian (UWW)	10
Christoffer Dahlén (SWE)	0
Iuri Lomadze (GEO)	8
Aliaksandr Liavonchyk (UWW)	8
Mikko Peltokangas (FIN)	3

Quarterfinals
Levente Lévai (HUN)	5
Alen Mirzoian (UWW)	3
Iuri Lomadze (GEO)	1
Aliaksandr Liavonchyk (UWW)	5

Semifinals
Levente Lévai (HUN)	5
Aliaksandr Liavonchyk (UWW)	2

=== Bottom half ===
Round of 32
Ivo Iliev (BUL)	5
Pavel Puklavec (CRO)	1
Shant Khachatryan (ARM)	6
Parviz Nasibov (UKR)	10

Round of 16
Ibrahim Ghanem (FRA)	7
Mehmet Mustafa Şahin (TUR)	4
Ivo Iliev (BUL)	3
Mihai Petic (MDA)	9
Kristupas Šleiva (LTU)	10
Parviz Nasibov (UKR)	0
Jakub Šimčik (CZE)	0
Ali Arsalan (SRB)	8

Quarterfinals
Ibrahim Ghanem (FRA)	8
Mihai Petic (MDA)	0
Kristupas Šleiva (LTU)	9
Ali Arsalan (SRB)	0

Semifinals
Ibrahim Ghanem (FRA)	4
Kristupas Šleiva (LTU)	3

=== Repechage ===
Repechage round 2
Ulvu Ganizade (AZE)	3
Alen Mirzoian (UWW)	1
Mehmet Mustafa Şahin (TUR)	5
Mihai Petic (MDA)	2

Bronze medal match
Ulvu Ganizade (AZE)	2
Aliaksandr Liavonchyk (UWW)	1
Mehmet Mustafa Şahin (TUR)	9
Kristupas Šleiva (LTU)	2

== Final standing ==
Rank	Athlete
1st place, gold medalist(s)	Levente Lévai (HUN)
1st place, gold medalist(s)	Ibrahim Ghanem (FRA)
3rd place, bronze medalist(s)	Ulvu Ganizade (AZE)
3rd place, bronze medalist(s)	Mehmet Mustafa Şahin (TUR)
5	Aliaksandr Liavonchyk (UWW)
5	Kristupas Šleiva (LTU)
7	Iuri Lomadze (GEO)
8	Sebastian Aak (NOR)
9	Alen Mirzoian (UWW)
10	Ali Arsalan (SRB)
11	Mihai Petic (MDA)
12	Ivo Iliev (BUL)
13	Parviz Nasibov (UKR)
14	Shant Khachatryan (ARM)
15	Mikko Peltokangas (FIN)
16	Aleksander Mielewczyk (POL)
17	Pavel Puklavec (CRO)
18	Christoffer Dahlén (SWE)
19	Michael Portmann (SUI)
20	Jakub Šimčik (CZE)
