= 2022 World Wrestling Championships – Men's Greco-Roman 72 kg =

Wrestling competitions

Men's Greco-Roman 72 kg at the 2022 World Championships
- Venue: Štark Arena
- Dates: 10–11 September 2022
- Competitors: 25 from 25 nations

Medalists
gold medal	Ali Arsalan	Serbia
silver medal	Ulvu Ganizade	Azerbaijan
bronze medal	Andrii Kulyk	Ukraine
bronze medal	Selçuk Can	Turkey

The men's Greco-Roman 72 kilograms is a competition featured at the 2022 World Wrestling Championships, and was held in Belgrade, Serbia on 10 and 11 September 2022.

This Greco-Roman wrestling competition consists of a single-elimination tournament, with a repechage used to determine the winners of two bronze medals.

The two finalists face off for the gold and silver medals. Each wrestler who loses to one of the two finalists moves into the repechage, culminating in a pair of bronze medal matches, with the semifinal losers each facing the remaining repechage opponent from their half of the bracket.

== Results ==
Legend

- F — Won by fall
- WO — Won by walkover

=== Final ===
Final
Ali Arsalan (SRB)	7
Ulvu Ganizade (AZE)	4

=== Top half ===
Round of 32
Matias Lipasti (FIN)	5
Mirzobek Rakhmatov (UZB)	5
Ali Arsalan (SRB)	11
Andrii Kulyk (UKR)	2
Benji Peak (USA)	1
Róbert Fritsch (HUN)	3
Alejandro Varela (GUA)	11
Arnaud Mambou (CGO)	0
Jakub Bielesz (CZE)	0
Ibrahim Ghanem (FRA)	8

Round of 16
Kristupas Šleiva (LTU)	6
Matias Lipasti (FIN)	3
Ali Arsalan (SRB)	7
Róbert Fritsch (HUN)	3
Valentin Petic (MDA)	9
Alejandro Varela (GUA)	0
Ibrahim Ghanem (FRA)	7
Mohammad Reza Mokhtari (IRI)	3

Quarterfinals
Kristupas Šleiva (LTU)	0
Ali Arsalan (SRB)	9
Valentin Petic (MDA)	0
Ibrahim Ghanem (FRA)	6

Semifinals
Ali Arsalan (SRB)	5^{F}
Ibrahim Ghanem (FRA)	1

=== Bottom half ===
Round of 32
Shmagi Bolkvadze (GEO)	2
Vikas Dalal (IND)	1
Lee Ji-yeon (KOR)	6
Pavel Puklavec (CRO)	3
~~Reagan Ndombasi (COD)~~
Samuel Bellscheidt (GER)	WO
Taishi Horie (JPN)	3
Ibragim Magomadov (KAZ)	7

Round of 16
Gevorg Sahakyan (POL)	4
Shmagi Bolkvadze (GEO)	3
Lee Ji-yeon (KOR)	3
Selçuk Can (TUR)	3
Deyvid Dimitrov (BUL)	3
Samuel Bellscheidt (GER)	2
Ibragim Magomadov (KAZ)	2
Ulvu Ganizade (AZE)	4

Quarterfinals
Gevorg Sahakyan (POL)	1
Selçuk Can (TUR)	3
Deyvid Dimitrov (BUL)	0
Ulvu Ganizade (AZE)	10

Semifinals
Selçuk Can (TUR)	3
Ulvu Ganizade (AZE)	4

=== Repechage ===
Repechage round 1
Andrii Kulyk (UKR)	10
Róbert Fritsch (HUN)	4

Repechage round 2
Andrii Kulyk (UKR)	8
Kristupas Šleiva (LTU)	0
Ibragim Magomadov (KAZ)	4
Deyvid Dimitrov (BUL)	0

Bronze medals
Andrii Kulyk (UKR)	4
Ibrahim Ghanem (FRA)	3
Ibragim Magomadov (KAZ)	3
Selçuk Can (TUR)	3

== Final standing ==
Rank	Athlete
1st place, gold medalist(s)	Ali Arsalan (SRB)
2nd place, silver medalist(s)	Ulvu Ganizade (AZE)
3rd place, bronze medalist(s)	Andrii Kulyk (UKR)
3rd place, bronze medalist(s)	Selçuk Can (TUR)
5	Ibrahim Ghanem (FRA)
5	Ibragim Magomadov (KAZ)
7	Samuel Bellscheidt (GER)
8	Róbert Fritsch (HUN)
9	Alejandro Varela (GUA)
10	Valentin Petic (MDA)
11	Lee Ji-yeon (KOR)
12	Matias Lipasti (FIN)
13	Shmagi Bolkvadze (GEO)
14	Gevorg Sahakyan (POL)
15	Kristupas Šleiva (LTU)
16	Deyvid Dimitrov (BUL)
17	Mirzobek Rakhmatov (UZB)
18	Pavel Puklavec (CRO)
19	Mohammad Reza Mokhtari (IRI)
20	Taishi Horie (JPN)
21	Vikas Dalal (IND)
22	Benji Peak (USA)
23	Jakub Bielesz (CZE)
24	Arnaud Mambou (CGO)
—	Reagan Ndombasi (COD)
