= 2021 World Wrestling Championships – Men's Greco-Roman 72 kg =

Wrestling competitions

Men's Greco-Roman 72 kg at the 2021 World Championships
- Venue: Nye Jordal Amfi
- Dates: 7–8 October 2021
- Competitors: 27 from 27 nations

Medalists
gold medal	Malkhas Amoyan	Armenia
silver medal	Sergey Kutuzov	RWF
bronze medal	Gevorg Sahakyan	Poland
bronze medal	Kristupas Šleiva	Lithuania

The men's Greco-Roman 72 kilograms is a competition featured at the 2021 World Wrestling Championships, and was held in Oslo, Norway on 7 and 8 October.

This Greco-Roman wrestling competition consists of a single-elimination tournament, with a repechage used to determine the winner of two bronze medals. The two finalists face off for gold and silver medals. Each wrestler who loses to one of the two finalists moves into the repechage, culminating in a pair of bronze medal matches featuring the semifinal losers each facing the remaining repechage opponent from their half of the bracket.

== Results ==
Legend

- F — Won by fall

=== Final ===
Final
Sergey Kutuzov (RWF)	1
Malkhas Amoyan (ARM)	3

=== Top half ===
Round of 32
Cengiz Arslan (TUR)	8
Vikas Dalal (IND)	0
Ruslan Tsarev (KGZ)	3
Maksym Yevtushenko (UKR)	1
Sergey Kutuzov (RWF)	7
Yury Kankou (BLR)	0
Pat Smith (USA)	3
Valentin Petic (MDA)	4
Ibrahim Ghanem (FRA)	2
Aleksa Erski (SRB)	1

Round of 16
Róbert Fritsch (HUN)	3
Mikko Peltokangas (FIN)	4
Cengiz Arslan (TUR)	10^{F}
Ruslan Tsarev (KGZ)	0
Sergey Kutuzov (RWF)	10
Valentin Petic (MDA)	2
Ibrahim Ghanem (FRA)	1
Gevorg Sahakyan (POL)	6

Quarterfinals
Mikko Peltokangas (FIN)	0
Cengiz Arslan (TUR)	9
Sergey Kutuzov (RWF)	7
Gevorg Sahakyan (POL)	3

Semifinals
Cengiz Arslan (TUR)	0
Sergey Kutuzov (RWF)	10

=== Bottom half ===
Round of 32
Håvard Jørgensen (NOR)	3
Jair Cuero (COL)	1
Kaharman Kissymetov (KAZ)	1
Kristupas Šleiva (LTU)	11
Deyvid Dimitrov (BUL)	4
Tomohiro Inoue (JPN)	4
Leoš Drmola (SVK)	2
Lee Ji-yul (KOR)	10
Christoph Burger (AUT)	0
Mohammad Reza Mokhtari (IRI)	9
Idris Ibaev (GER)	6
Ulvu Ganizade (AZE)	9

Round of 16
Malkhas Amoyan (ARM)	8
Håvard Jørgensen (NOR)	0
Kristupas Šleiva (LTU)	8
Deyvid Dimitrov (BUL)	0
Lee Ji-yul (KOR)	2
Mohammad Reza Mokhtari (IRI)	12
Ulvu Ganizade (AZE)	4
Shmagi Bolkvadze (GEO)	3

Quarterfinals
Malkhas Amoyan (ARM)	5
Kristupas Šleiva (LTU)	0
Mohammad Reza Mokhtari (IRI)	9
Ulvu Ganizade (AZE)	0

Semifinals
Malkhas Amoyan (ARM)	10
Mohammad Reza Mokhtari (IRI)	6

=== Repechage ===
Repechage round 1
Yury Kankou (BLR)	0
Valentin Petic (MDA)	4

Repechage round 2
Valentin Petic (MDA)	1
Gevorg Sahakyan (POL)	3
Håvard Jørgensen (NOR)	1
Kristupas Šleiva (LTU)	2

Bronze medals
Gevorg Sahakyan (POL)	1
Cengiz Arslan (TUR)	1
Kristupas Šleiva (LTU)	10
Mohammad Reza Mokhtari (IRI)	1

== Final standing ==
Rank	Athlete
1st place, gold medalist(s)	Malkhas Amoyan (ARM)
2nd place, silver medalist(s)	Sergey Kutuzov (RWF)
3rd place, bronze medalist(s)	Gevorg Sahakyan (POL)
3rd place, bronze medalist(s)	Kristupas Šleiva (LTU)
5	Cengiz Arslan (TUR)
5	Mohammad Reza Mokhtari (IRI)
7	Valentin Petic (MDA)
8	Ulvu Ganizade (AZE)
9	Lee Ji-yul (KOR)
10	Håvard Jørgensen (NOR)
11	Ibrahim Ghanem (FRA)
12	Mikko Peltokangas (FIN)
13	Deyvid Dimitrov (BUL)
14	Ruslan Tsarev (KGZ)
15	Idris Ibaev (GER)
16	Tomohiro Inoue (JPN)
17	Róbert Fritsch (HUN)
18	Shmagi Bolkvadze (GEO)
19	Pat Smith (USA)
20	Leoš Drmola (SVK)
21	Aleksa Erski (SRB)
22	Maksym Yevtushenko (UKR)
23	Jair Cuero (COL)
24	Kaharman Kissymetov (KAZ)
25	Vikas Dalal (IND)
26	Christoph Burger (AUT)
27	Yury Kankou (BLR)
