= 2023 European Wrestling Championships – Men's Greco-Roman 72 kg =

Wrestling competition

Men's Greco-Roman 72 kg at the 2023 European Wrestling Championships
- Venue: Arena Zagreb
- Location: Zagreb, Croatia
- Dates: 22-23 April
- Competitors: 17

Medalists
gold medal	Ulvu Ganizade	Azerbaijan
silver medal	Ibrahim Ghanem	France
bronze medal	Kamil Czarnecki	Poland
bronze medal	Selçuk Can	Turkey

The Men's Greco-Roman 72 kg is a competition featured at the 2023 European Wrestling Championships, and will held in Zagreb, Croatia on April 22 and 23.

== Results ==
Legend

- F — Won by fall

Round of 32
	Score	
Shant Khachatryan (ARM)	9–3	Ramaz Zoidze (GEO)

Round of 16
Ali Arsalan (SRB)	5^{F}
Kristupas Šleiva (LTU)	0
Shant Khachatryan (ARM)	9^{F}
Valentin Petic (MDA)	4
Kamil Czarnecki (POL)	8
Michael Portmann (SUI)	0
Jakub Bielesz (CZE)	0
Ibrahim Ghanem (FRA)	9
Ulvu Ganizade (AZE)	4
Andrii Kulyk (UKR)	1
Matias Lipasti (FIN)	0
Deyvid Dimitrov (BUL)	10
Pavel Puklavec (CRO)	2
Michael Widmayer (GER)	10
Róbert Fritsch (HUN)	1
Selçuk Can (TUR)	7

Quarterfinals
Ali Arsalan (SRB)	4
Shant Khachatryan (ARM)	3
Kamil Czarnecki (POL)	0
Ibrahim Ghanem (FRA)	8
Ulvu Ganizade (AZE)	3
Deyvid Dimitrov (BUL)	1
Michael Widmayer (GER)	0
Selçuk Can (TUR)	6

Semifinals
Ali Arsalan (SRB)	3
Ibrahim Ghanem (FRA)	6
Ulvu Ganizade (AZE)	2
Selçuk Can (TUR)	1

Final
Ibrahim Ghanem (FRA)	7
Ulvu Ganizade (AZE)	7

Repechage round 2
Jakub Bielesz (CZE)	0
Kamil Czarnecki (POL)	9
Andrii Kulyk (UKR)	9
Deyvid Dimitrov (BUL)	0

Bronze medal match
Kamil Czarnecki (POL)	10
Ali Arsalan (SRB)	2
Andrii Kulyk (UKR)	1
Selçuk Can (TUR)	5

== Final standing ==
Rank	Athlete
1st place, gold medalist(s)	Ulvu Ganizade (AZE)
2nd place, silver medalist(s)	Ibrahim Ghanem (FRA)
3rd place, bronze medalist(s)	Selçuk Can (TUR)
3rd place, bronze medalist(s)	Kamil Czarnecki (POL)
5	Ali Arsalan (SRB)
5	Andrii Kulyk (UKR)
7	Shant Khachatryan (ARM)
8	Deyvid Dimitrov (BUL)
9	Michael Widmayer (GER)
10	Ramaz Zoidze (GEO)
11	Pavel Puklavec (CRO)
12	Róbert Fritsch (HUN)
13	Valentin Petic (MDA)
14	Kristupas Šleiva (LTU)
15	Michael Portmann (SUI)
16	Matias Lipasti (FIN)
17	Jakub Bielesz (CZE)
