= 2025 World Wrestling Championships – Men's Greco-Roman 72 kg =

Wrestling competitions

Men's Greco-Roman 72 kg at the 2025 World Championships
- Venue: Arena Zagreb
- Dates: 19–20 September 2025
- Competitors: 30 from 28 nations

Medalists
gold medal	Ulvu Ganizade	Azerbaijan
silver medal	Ibrahim Ghanem	France
bronze medal	Abdullo Aliev	Uzbekistan
bronze medal	Danial Sohrabi	Iran

The men's Greco-Roman 72 kilograms is a competition featured at the 2025 World Wrestling Championships, and was held in Zagreb, Croatia on 19 and 20 September 2025.

This Greco-Roman wrestling competition consists of a single-elimination tournament, with a repechage used to determine the winner of two bronze medals. The two finalists face off for gold and silver medals. Each wrestler who loses to one of the two finalists moves into the repechage, culminating in a pair of bronze medal matches, featuring the semifinal losers each facing the remaining repechage opponent from their half of the bracket.

== Results ==
Legend

- F — Won by fall
- R — Retired

=== Final ===
Final
Ulvu Ganizade (AZE)	4
Ibrahim Ghanem (FRA)	2

=== Top half ===
Round of 32
Chen Xin (CHN)	0
Abdelmalek Merabet (ALG)	8
Noh Yeong-hun (KOR)	9
Ankit Gulia (IND)	0
Dalgat Magomedov (CZE)	0
István Váncza (HUN)	9
Iuri Lomadze (GEO)	1
Selçuk Can (TUR)	3
Michael Portmann (SUI)	2
Taishi Narikuni (JPN)	1
Aleksander Mielewczyk (POL)	9
Rafeeq El-Natsheh (QAT)	0
Pavel Puklavec (CRO)	1
Abdullo Aliev (UZB)	4

Round of 16
Ulvu Ganizade (AZE)	6
Abdelmalek Merabet (ALG)	0
Noh Yeong-hun (KOR)	12
István Váncza (HUN)	4
Selçuk Can (TUR)	2
Michael Portmann (SUI)	8
Aleksander Mielewczyk (POL)	0
Abdullo Aliev (UZB)	6

Quarterfinals
Ulvu Ganizade (AZE)	8
Noh Yeong-hun (KOR)	3
Michael Portmann (SUI)	0
Abdullo Aliev (UZB)	8

Semifinals
Ulvu Ganizade (AZE)	5
Abdullo Aliev (UZB)	0

=== Bottom half ===
Round of 32
Ibrahim Ghanem (FRA)	4
Alejandro Sancho (USA)	0
Luis Barrios (HON)	0
Gor Khachatryan (ARM)	8
Dmitrii Adamov (UWW)	8
Didar Orazberdiýew (TKM)	0
Amantur Ismailov (KGZ)	1
Danial Sohrabi (IRI)	10
Mihai Petic (MDA)	1
Aliaksandr Liavonchyk (UWW)	1
Deyvid Dimitrov (BUL)	4
Parviz Nasibov (UKR)	5
Matias Lipasti (FIN)	0
Merey Maulitkanov (KAZ)	3

Round of 16
Ibrahim Ghanem (FRA)	5
Gor Khachatryan (ARM)	0
Dmitrii Adamov (UWW)	1
Danial Sohrabi (IRI)	10
Aliaksandr Liavonchyk (UWW)	0
Parviz Nasibov (UKR)	5
Merey Maulitkanov (KAZ)	5
Ali Arsalan (SRB)	3

Quarterfinals
Ibrahim Ghanem (FRA)	4
Danial Sohrabi (IRI)	2^{R}
Parviz Nasibov (UKR)	3
Merey Maulitkanov (KAZ)	4

Semifinals
Ibrahim Ghanem (FRA)	7^{F}
Merey Maulitkanov (KAZ)	2

=== Repechage ===
Repechage round 1
Alejandro Sancho (USA)	1
Gor Khachatryan (ARM)	6

Repechage round 2
Abdelmalek Merabet (ALG)	3
Noh Yeong-hun (KOR)	4
Gor Khachatryan (ARM)	0
Danial Sohrabi (IRI)	9^{F}

Bronze medals
Noh Yeong-hun (KOR)	0
Abdullo Aliev (UZB)	8
Danial Sohrabi (IRI)	8
Merey Maulitkanov (KAZ)	0

== Final standing ==
Rank	Athlete
1st place, gold medalist(s)	Ulvu Ganizade (AZE)
2nd place, silver medalist(s)	Ibrahim Ghanem (FRA)
3rd place, bronze medalist(s)	Abdullo Aliev (UZB)
3rd place, bronze medalist(s)	Danial Sohrabi (IRI)
5	Noh Yeong-hun (KOR)
5	Merey Maulitkanov (KAZ)
7	Gor Khachatryan (ARM)
8	Parviz Nasibov (UKR)
9	Michael Portmann (SUI)
10	István Váncza (HUN)
11	Abdelmalek Merabet (ALG)
12	Dmitrii Adamov (UWW)
13	Aleksander Mielewczyk (POL)
14	Selçuk Can (TUR)
15	Aliaksandr Liavonchyk (UWW)
16	Deyvid Dimitrov (BUL)
17	Ali Arsalan (SRB)
18	Mihai Petic (MDA)
19	Taishi Narikuni (JPN)
20	Iuri Lomadze (GEO)
21	Pavel Puklavec (CRO)
22	Alejandro Sancho (USA)
23	Amantur Ismailov (KGZ)
24	Matias Lipasti (FIN)
25	Chen Xin (CHN)
26	Luis Barrios (HON)
27	Didar Orazberdiýew (TKM)
28	Ankit Gulia (IND)
29	Dalgat Magomedov (CZE)
30	Rafeeq El-Natsheh (QAT)
