= 2020 European Wrestling Championships – Men's Greco-Roman 72 kg =

Wrestling competition

The men's Greco-Roman 72 kg is a competition featured at the 2020 European Wrestling Championships, and was held in Rome, Italy on February 11 and February 12.

== Medalists ==
Gold	Frank Stäbler; Germany
Silver	Iuri Lomadze; Georgia
Bronze	Ulvu Ganizade; Azerbaijan
Bronze	Selçuk Can; Turkey

== Results ==
Legend

- F — Won by fall

=== Final ===
Final
Frank Stäbler (GER)	6
Iuri Lomadze (GEO)	2

=== Top half ===
Round of 32

Round of 16
Stoyan Kubatov (BUL)	1
Ulvu Ganizade (AZE)	6
Frank Stäbler (GER)	8
Anatolie Popov (MDA)	0
Petros Manouilidis (GRE)	0
Ibrahim Ghanem (FRA)	6
Adam Kurak (RUS)	8
Sebastian Aak (NOR)	0

Quarterfinals
Ulvu Ganizade (AZE)	0
Frank Stäbler (GER)	8
Ibrahim Ghanem (FRA)	1
Adam Kurak (RUS)	5

Semifinals
Frank Stäbler (GER)	11
Adam Kurak (RUS)	1

=== Bottom half ===
Round of 32
Mateusz Bernatek (POL)	2
Selçuk Can (TUR)	3
Leoš Drmola (SVK)	0
Mikko Peltokangas (FIN)	10
Davor Štefanek (SRB)	4
Iuri Lomadze (GEO)	6
Yury Kankou (BLR)	8
Agron Sadikaj (BIH)	0
Malkhas Amoyan (ARM)	1
Dominik Etlinger (CRO)	5
Riccardo Glave (ITA)	5
Christoph Burger (AUT)	3

Round of 16
Róbert Fritsch (HUN)	4
Andrii Kulyk (UKR)	3
Selçuk Can (TUR)	3
Mikko Peltokangas (FIN)	3
Iuri Lomadze (GEO)	11
Yury Kankou (BLR)	0
Dominik Etlinger (CRO)	9
Riccardo Glave (ITA)	0

Quarterfinals
Róbert Fritsch (HUN)	3
Selçuk Can (TUR)	7
Iuri Lomadze (GEO)	11
Dominik Etlinger (CRO)	0

Semifinals
Selçuk Can (TUR)	0
Iuri Lomadze (GEO)	7

=== Repechage ===
Repechage round 1
Davor Štefanek (SRB)	6
Yury Kankou (BLR)	8

Repechage round 2
Anatolie Popov (MDA)	0
Ulvu Ganizade (AZE)	8
Yury Kankou (BLR)	0
Dominik Etlinger (CRO)	8

Bronze medal match
Ulvu Ganizade (AZE)	3
Adam Kurak (RUS)	1
Dominik Etlinger (CRO)	5
Selçuk Can (TUR)	7

== Final standing ==
Rank	Athlete
1st place, gold medalist(s)	Frank Stäbler (GER)
2nd place, silver medalist(s)	Iuri Lomadze (GEO)
3rd place, bronze medalist(s)	Ulvu Ganizade (AZE)
3rd place, bronze medalist(s)	Selçuk Can (TUR)
5	Adam Kurak (RUS)
5	Dominik Etlinger (CRO)
7	Yury Kankou (BLR)
8	Mikko Peltokangas (FIN)
9	Ibrahim Ghanem (FRA)
10	Róbert Fritsch (HUN)
11	Riccardo Glave (ITA)
12	Davor Štefanek (SRB)
13	Andrii Kulyk (UKR)
14	Christoph Burger (AUT)
15	Mateusz Bernatek (POL)
16	Malkhas Amoyan (ARM)
17	Stoyan Kubatov (BUL)
18	Petros Manouilidis (GRE)
19	Sebastian Aak (NOR)
20	Agron Sadikaj (BIH)
21	Leoš Drmola (SVK)
22	Anatolie Popov (MDA)
