= Grand Prix de France Henri Deglane 2026 =

Henri Deglane Grand Prix 2026
- Host city: Nice, France
- Dates: 16–18 January 2026
- Stadium: Halle des sports Charles-Ehrmann

Champions
- Freestyle: United States
- Greco-Roman: Ukraine
- Women: France

The LII Grand Prix de France Henri Deglane 2026 (also known as Grand Prix of France 2026 and Henri Deglane Grand Prix 2026) was a wrestling event was held in Nice, France. It is held in the memory of 1924 Olympic Gold medalist Henri Deglane.

== Event videos ==
The event will air freely on the FranceLutte YouTube channel.

Broadcasting
16 January 2025 Mat B
17 January 2025 Mat A	17 January 2025 Mat B	17 January 2025 Mat C
18 January 2025 Mat A	18 January 2025 Part 1	18 January 2025 Part 2

== Medal table ==
* Host nation (France)

Rank	Nation	Gold	Silver	Bronze	Total
1	Ukraine	10	3	1	14
2	United States	6	3	5	14
3	France*	5	7	7	19
4	Italy	2	2	1	5
5	Spain	2	1	0	3
6	Moldova	1	4	1	6
7	Germany	1	0	3	4
8	Georgia	1	0	1	2
9	Finland	0	3	0	3
10	Switzerland	0	2	2	4
11	Lithuania	0	1	2	3
12	Belgium	0	1	1	2
13	United World Wrestling	0	1	0	1
14	Denmark	0	0	3	3
15	Czech Republic	0	0	2	2
16	Austria	0	0	1	1
16	Ivory Coast	0	0	1	1
16	Puerto Rico	0	0	1	1
16	Romania	0	0	1	1
Totals (19 entries)		28	28	33	89

== Team ranking ==
Rank	Men's freestyle		Men's Greco-Roman		Women's freestyle	
Rank	Team	Points	Team	Points	Team	Points
1	United States	328	Ukraine	325	France	207
2	France	163	France	136	Italy	117
3	Moldova	152	Denmark	79	Spain	82
4	Germany	138	Germany	70	United States	45
5	Georgia	92	Switzerland	65	Czech Republic	42
6	Switzerland	63	Lithuania	54	Finland	40
7	Austria	55	Belgium	20	Romania	15
8	Spain	36	Tunisia	12	Ivory Coast	15
9	Puerto Rico	25	Benin	10	—	—
10	Finland	24	Chinese Taipei	4	—	—

== Medal overview ==
=== Men's freestyle ===
Event	Gold	Silver	Bronze
57 kg	Rassoul Galbouraev; France	Thomas Epp; Switzerland	Karamjeet Holstein; Germany
61 kg	Austin DeSanto; United States	Leonid Colesnic; Moldova	Nils Leutert; Switzerland
65 kg	Magomed Kartojev; Germany	Quentin Sticker; France	Marwane Yezza; France
65 kg	Magomed Kartojev; Germany	Quentin Sticker; France	Sergiu Lupașco; Moldova
70 kg	Vasile Diacon; Moldova	Ed Scott; United States	Alec Pantaleo; United States
70 kg	Vasile Diacon; Moldova	Ed Scott; United States	Muhammad Abdurachmanov; Belgium
74 kg	David Carr; United States	Seyfulla Itaev; France	William Lewan; United States
74 kg	David Carr; United States	Seyfulla Itaev; France	Terrell Barraclough; United States
79 kg	Zelimkhan Khadjiev; France	Vlad Stratan; Moldova	Davit Tchetchelashvili; Georgia
79 kg	Zelimkhan Khadjiev; France	Vlad Stratan; Moldova	Marat Kardanov; Germany
86 kg	Tornike Tulashvili; Georgia	Miko Elkala; Finland	Mohammad Umkhadjiev; France
86 kg	Tornike Tulashvili; Georgia	Miko Elkala; Finland	Ethan Ramos; Puerto Rico
92 kg	Jacob Cardenas; United States	Ion Demian; Moldova	Michael Macchiavello; United States
97 kg	Stephen Buchanan; United States	Radu Lefter; Moldova	Adlan Viskhanov; France
97 kg	Stephen Buchanan; United States	Radu Lefter; Moldova	Zane Lanham; United States
125 kg	Mason Parris; United States	Coby Merrill; United States	Johannes Ludescher; Austria

=== Men's Greco-Roman ===
Event	Gold	Silver	Bronze
55 kg	Koriun Sahradian; Ukraine	Nolan Pissocher; France	Ivan Stefanskyi; Ukraine
60 kg	Vladyslav Kuzko; Ukraine	Ilian Ainaui; France	Lucas Lo Grasso; France
63 kg	Maksym Liu; Ukraine	Jamal Valizadeh; United World Wrestling	Not awarded as there were only 2 competitors.
67 kg	Oleksandr Hrushyn; Ukraine	Yanis Nifri; France	William Reenberg; Denmark
72 kg	Dmytro Vasyliev; Ukraine	Parviz Nasibov; Ukraine	Andreas Vetsch; Switzerland
77 kg	Irfan Mirzoiev; Ukraine	Andrii Kulyk; Ukraine	Paulius Galkinas; Lithuania
77 kg	Irfan Mirzoiev; Ukraine	Andrii Kulyk; Ukraine	Rokas Čepauskas; Lithuania
82 kg	Ruslan Abdiiev; Ukraine	Ibrahim Tabaev; Belgium	Oliver Krüger; Denmark
87 kg	Yaroslav Filchakov; Ukraine	Darmian von Euw; Switzerland	Frederik Mathiesen; Denmark
97 kg	Vladlen Kozlyuk; Ukraine	Yehor Yakushenko; Ukraine	Anton Vieweg; Germany
130 kg	Mykhailo Vyshnyvetskyi; Ukraine	Mantas Knystautas; Lithuania	Not awarded as there were only 2 competitors.

=== Women's freestyle ===
Event	Gold	Silver	Bronze
50 kg	Emanuela Liuzzi; Italy	Joséphine Haemmerle; France	Ştefania Priceputu; Romania
53 kg	Emma Luttenauer; France	Tetiana Profatilova; France	Maëlyss Rousselet; France
55 kg	Carla Jaume; Spain	Alyssa Mahan; United States	Nogona Bakayoko; Ivory Coast
57 kg	Fabiana Rinella; Italy	Jenna Hemiä; Finland	Céleste Sion; France
59 kg	Lydia Pérez; Spain	Rosa Molina; Spain	Petra Mráčková; Czech Republic
62 kg	Améline Douarre; France	Immacolata Danise; Italy	Iris Thiébaux; France
65 kg	Madeline Kubicki; United States	Silja Kamppinen; Finland	Anna Mazgajová; Czech Republic
68 kg	Pauline Lecarpentier; France	None awarded Only one participant was registered.	
72 kg	no competitors		
76 kg	Kendra Dacher; France	Enrica Rinaldi; Italy	Fabiana Dattilo; Italy

== Participating nations ==
172 wrestlers from 24 countries:

1. Austria (6)
2. Belgium (2)
3. Benin (1)
4. Canada (1)
5. Ivory Coast (1)
6. Czech Republic (3)
7. Denmark (7)
8. Spain (10)
9. Finland (4)
10. France (33) (Host)
11. United Kingdom (1)
12. Georgia (8)
13. Germany (17)
14. Israel (1)
15. Italy (6)
16. Lithuania (4)
17. Moldova (10)
18. Puerto Rico (2)
19. Romania (1)
20. Switzerland (11)
21. Chinese Taipei (2)
22. Tunisia (1)
23. Ukraine (14)
24. United States (24)
25. United World Wrestling (1)

== Results ==
=== Men's freestyle ===
==== Men's freestyle 57 kg ====
Pos	Athlete	Pld	W	L	CP	TP	FRA	GER	USA
1	Rassoul Galbouraev (FRA)	2	2	0	8	21	—	11–0	10–0
2	Karamjeet Holstein (GER)	2	1	1	5	6	0–4 SU	—	6–9 Fall
3	Lucas Kaufman (USA)	2	0	2	0	9	0–4 SU	0–5 FA	—

Source: UWW

Pos	Athlete	Pld	W	L	CP	TP	SUI	GBR	USA
1	Thomas Epp (SUI)	2	2	0	6	7	—	3–3	4–1
2	Danoush Jowkar (GBR)	2	1	1	6	11	1–3 PO1	—	8–1 Fall
3	Czar Quintanilla (USA)	2	0	2	1	2	1–3 PO1	0–5 FA	—

Source: UWW

Semifinals
Rassoul Galbouraev (FRA)	5
Danoush Jowkar (GBR)	0
Karamjeet Holstein (GER)	4
Thomas Epp (SUI)	4

Final
Rassoul Galbouraev (FRA)	3
Thomas Epp (SUI)	2
Third place
Danoush Jowkar (GBR)	4
Karamjeet Holstein (GER)	12

==== Men's freestyle 61 kg ====
Pos	Athlete	Pld	W	L	CP	TP	USA	MDA	USA	GER
1	Austin DeSanto (USA)	3	3	0	12	31	—	11–0	10–0	10–0
2	Leonid Colesnic (MDA)	3	2	1	7	17	0–4 SU	—	7–2	10–0
3	Nathan Tomasello (USA)	3	1	2	5	12	0–4 SU	1–3 PO1	—	10–0
4	Florian Richter (GER)	3	0	3	0	0	0–4 SU	0–4 SU	0–4 SU	—

Source: UWW

Pos	Athlete	Pld	W	L	CP	TP	SUI	GER	USA
1	Nils Leutert (SUI)	2	2	0	7	21	—	11–4	10–0
2	David Kiefer (GER)	2	1	1	5	16	1–3 PO1	—	12–2
3	Jeremiah Waldschmidt (USA)	2	0	2	1	2	0–4 SU	1–4 SU1	—

Source: UWW

Semifinals
Austin DeSanto (USA)	10
David Kiefer (GER)	0
Leonid Colesnic (MDA)	10
Nils Leutert (SUI)	0

Final
Austin DeSanto (USA)	12
Leonid Colesnic (MDA)	2
Third place
David Kiefer (GER)	0
Nils Leutert (SUI)	10

==== Men's freestyle 65 kg ====
Round of 16
Ilyas Abdurashidov (BEL)	1
Sergiu Lupașco (MDA)	7
Quentin Sticker (FRA)	10
Javier Díaz-Alejo (ESP)	0
Mathis Lelong (FRA)	2
Felipe Ferrusola (ESP)	1

Quarterfinals
Sergiu Lupașco (MDA)	10
Michael Saba (USA)	0
Quentin Sticker (FRA)	16
Moritz Langer (GER)	3
Mathis Lelong (FRA)	0
Magomed Kartojev (GER)	11
Marwane Yezza (FRA)	10
Marcel Andronache (MDA)	0

Semifinals
Sergiu Lupașco (MDA)	8
Quentin Sticker (FRA)	15
Magomed Kartojev (GER)	4
Marwane Yezza (FRA)	3

Final
Quentin Sticker (FRA)	5
Magomed Kartojev (GER)	6

Repechage 2 of 4
Ilyas Abdurashidov (BEL)
Marcel Andronache (MDA)	WO
Javier Díaz-Alejo (ESP)	1
Mathis Lelong (FRA)	10
Felipe Ferrusola (ESP)	0
Moritz Langer (GER)	5

Repechage 3 of 4
Marcel Andronache (MDA)	5
Mathis Lelong (FRA)	6
Moritz Langer (GER)	5
Michael Saba (USA)	0

Bronze medals
Mathis Lelong (FRA)	0
Sergiu Lupașco (MDA)	11
Moritz Langer (GER)	2
Marwane Yezza (FRA)	11

==== Men's freestyle 70 kg ====
Round of 16
Chen Hong-yu (TPE)	4
Ed Scott (USA)	3^{F}
Ionuț Triboi (MDA)	7
Benedikt Huber (AUT)	1
Vasile Diacon (MDA)	14
Alexander Seiwald (AUT)	4
Sandro Hungerbühler (SUI)	0
Muhammad Abdurachmanov (BEL)	10

Quarterfinals
Ed Scott (USA)	11
Denis Kodakov (ESP)	1
Ionuț Triboi (MDA)	7
Abdoul-Malek Nakaev (FRA)	9
Vasile Diacon (MDA)	11
Luka Gugeshashvili (GEO)	0
Muhammad Abdurachmanov (BEL)	0
Alec Pantaleo (USA)	10

Semifinals
Ed Scott (USA)	8
Abdoul-Malek Nakaev (FRA)	2
Vasile Diacon (MDA)	8
Alec Pantaleo (USA)	6

Final
Ed Scott (USA)	2
Vasile Diacon (MDA)	9

Repechage 2 of 4
Chen Hong-yu (TPE)	0
Muhammad Abdurachmanov (BEL)	11
Benedikt Huber (AUT)	5
Luka Gugeshashvili (GEO)	2
Alexander Seiwald (AUT)	3
Ionuț Triboi (MDA)	3
Sandro Hungerbühler (SUI)	0
Denis Kodakov (ESP)	10

Repechage 3 of 4
Muhammad Abdurachmanov (BEL)	11
Benedikt Huber (AUT)	0
Ionuț Triboi (MDA)	6
Denis Kodakov (ESP)	2

Bronze medals
Muhammad Abdurachmanov (BEL)	6
Abdoul-Malek Nakaev (FRA)	2
Ionuț Triboi (MDA)	0
Alec Pantaleo (USA)	10

==== Men's freestyle 74 kg ====
Round of 16
Abdoullah Nakaev (FRA)	2
David Carr (USA)	6
Florian Bissig (SUI)	6
Gabriel Ojog (MDA)	6
Seyfulla Itaev (FRA)	10
Saba Kobakhidze (GEO)	0

Quarterfinals
David Carr (USA)	13
Muhamed Bektemirov (AUT)	2
Gabriel Ojog (MDA)	0
Terrell Barraclough (USA)	10
Seyfulla Itaev (FRA)	6
Joey Bianchi (USA)	0
Fabricio Reyes (ESP)	0
William Lewan (USA)	10

Semifinals
David Carr (USA)	4
Terrell Barraclough (USA)	0
Seyfulla Itaev (FRA)	2
William Lewan (USA)	0

Final
David Carr (USA)	5
Seyfulla Itaev (FRA)	1

Repechage 2 of 4
Abdoullah Nakaev (FRA)	10
Fabricio Reyes (ESP)	0
Florian Bissig (SUI)	0
Joey Bianchi (USA)	10
Saba Kobakhidze (GEO)	12
Gabriel Ojog (MDA)	5

Repechage 3 of 4
Abdoullah Nakaev (FRA)	0
Joey Bianchi (USA)	10
Saba Kobakhidze (GEO)	8
Muhamed Bektemirov (AUT)	6

Bronze medals
Joey Bianchi (USA)	6
Terrell Barraclough (USA)	9
Saba Kobakhidze (GEO)	3
William Lewan (USA)	7

==== Men's freestyle 79 kg ====
Round of 16
Ayman Nissr (GER)	2
Davit Tchetchelashvili (GEO)	8
Marat Kardanov (GER)	6^{F}
Giorgi Gogritchiani (GEO)	3

Quarterfinals
Davit Tchetchelashvili (GEO)	13
Kendall Drake (USA)	0
Konstantin Polewoi (GER)	0
Zelimkhan Khadjiev (FRA)	10
Marat Kardanov (GER)	5
Ben Smith (USA)	2
Kevin Henkel (GER)	2
Vlad Stratan (MDA)	3

Semifinals
Davit Tchetchelashvili (GEO)	0
Zelimkhan Khadjiev (FRA)	10^{F}
Marat Kardanov (GER)	1
Vlad Stratan (MDA)	6

Final
Zelimkhan Khadjiev (FRA)	5
Vlad Stratan (MDA)	0

Repechage 2 of 4
Ayman Nissr (GER)	0
Kevin Henkel (GER)	10
Giorgi Gogritchiani (GEO)	9
Konstantin Polewoi (GER)	0

Repechage 3 of 4
Kevin Henkel (GER)	10
Ben Smith (USA)	0
Giorgi Gogritchiani (GEO)	8
Kendall Drake (USA)	2

Bronze medals
Kevin Henkel (GER)	1
Davit Tchetchelashvili (GEO)	2
Giorgi Gogritchiani (GEO)	1
Marat Kardanov (GER)	3

==== Men's freestyle 86 kg ====
Round of 16
Umar Mavlaev (SUI)	0
Ethan Ramos (PUR)	10

Quarterfinals
Ethan Ramos (PUR)	4
Mohammad Umkhadjiev (FRA)	1
Tornike Tulashvili (GEO)	2
Gabriel Iglesias (ESP)	1
Tamaz Nikoleishvili (GEO)	2
Miko Elkala (FIN)	5^{F}
Simon Marchl (AUT)	17
Reese Spiro (USA)	7

Semifinals
Ethan Ramos (PUR)	3
Tornike Tulashvili (GEO)	5
Miko Elkala (FIN)	4
Simon Marchl (AUT)	3

Final
Tornike Tulashvili (GEO)	2
Miko Elkala (FIN)	0

Repechage 2 of 4
Umar Mavlaev (SUI)	12
Reese Spiro (USA)	1

Repechage 3 of 4
Umar Mavlaev (SUI)	2
Tamaz Nikoleishvili (GEO)	1
Gabriel Iglesias (ESP)	6
Mohammad Umkhadjiev (FRA)	10

Bronze medals
Umar Mavlaev (SUI)	0
Ethan Ramos (PUR)	10
Mohammad Umkhadjiev (FRA)	8
Simon Marchl (AUT)	2

==== Men's freestyle 92 kg ====
Pos	Athlete	Pld	W	L	CP	TP	GER	USA	GEO	MDA
1	Daniel Fischer (GER)	3	3	0	13	29	—	4–4 Fall	13–2	12–0
2	Jacob Cardenas (USA)	3	2	1	8	29	0–5 FA	—	15–4	10–0
3	Teimuraz Kochkiani (GEO)	3	1	2	6	20	1–4 SU1	1–4 SU1	—	14–1
4	Serghei Vizii (MDA)	3	0	3	1	1	0–4 SU	0–4 SU	1–4 SU1	—

Source: UWW

Pos	Athlete	Pld	W	L	CP	TP	USA	MDA	SUI
1	Michael Macchiavello (USA)	2	2	0	7	16	—	5–2	11–0
2	Ion Demian (MDA)	2	1	1	4	4	1–3 PO1	—	2–1
3	Samuel Scherrer (SUI)	2	0	2	1	1	0–4 SU	1–3 PO1	—

Source: UWW

Semifinals
Daniel Fischer (GER)	2
Ion Demian (MDA)	6
Jacob Cardenas (USA)	11
Michael Macchiavello (USA)	0

Final
Ion Demian (MDA)	6
Jacob Cardenas (USA)	6
Third place
Daniel Fischer (GER)	0
Michael Macchiavello (USA)	6

==== Men's freestyle 97 kg ====
Round of 16
Adlan Viskhanov (FRA)	5^{F}
Benjamin Greil (AUT)	0

Quarterfinals
Adlan Viskhanov (FRA)	11
Aimar Alzón (ESP)	1
Stephen Buchanan (USA)	13
Ramini Gulitashvili (GEO)	2
Zane Lanham (USA)	11
Nikita Goubarets (ISR)	1
Radu Lefter (MDA)	10
Juho Ruusila (FIN)	0

Semifinals
Adlan Viskhanov (FRA)	5
Stephen Buchanan (USA)	8
Zane Lanham (USA)	3
Radu Lefter (MDA)	14

Final
Stephen Buchanan (USA)	11
Radu Lefter (MDA)	0

Repechage 2 of 4
Benjamin Greil (AUT)	5
Juho Ruusila (FIN)	2

Repechage 3 of 4
Benjamin Greil (AUT)	13
Nikita Goubarets (ISR)	0
Ramini Gulitashvili (GEO)	4
Aimar Alzón (ESP)	0

Bronze medals
Benjamin Greil (AUT)	0
Adlan Viskhanov (FRA)	11
Ramini Gulitashvili (GEO)	1
Zane Lanham (USA)	2

==== Men's freestyle 125 kg ====
Pos	Athlete	Pld	W	L	CP	TP	AUT	GER	CAN	USA
1	Johannes Ludescher (AUT)	3	2	1	9	4	—	2–1	2–5	WO
2	Emil Thiele (GER)	3	2	1	9	5	1–3 PO1	—	4–1	WO
3	Roger Li (CAN)	3	2	1	7	14	3–1 PO1	1–3 PO1	—	8–6
4	Ceron Francisco (USA)	3	0	3	1	6	0–5 IN	0–5 IN	1–3 PO1	—

Source: UWW

Pos	Athlete	Pld	W	L	CP	TP	USA	USA	PUR
1	Mason Parris (USA)	2	2	0	7	17	—	7–2	10–0
2	Coby Merrill (USA)	2	1	1	4	7	1–3 PO1	—	5–0
3	Jonovan Smith (PUR)	2	0	2	0	0	0–4 SU	0–3 PO	—

Source: UWW

Semifinals
Johannes Ludescher (AUT)	0
Coby Merrill (USA)	10
Emil Thiele (GER)	0
Mason Parris (USA)	11

Final
Coby Merrill (USA)	0
Mason Parris (USA)	4
Third place
Johannes Ludescher (AUT)	2
Emil Thiele (GER)	1

=== Men's Greco-Roman ===
==== Men's Greco-Roman 55 kg ====
Pos	Athlete	Pld	W	L	CP	TP	UKR	FRA	UKR
1	Koriun Sahradian (UKR)	2	2	0	8	17	—	9–0	8–0
2	Nolan Pissocher (FRA)	2	1	1	3	3	0–4 SU	—	3–3
3	Ivan Stefanskyi (UKR)	2	0	2	1	3	0–4 SU	1–3 PO1	—

Source: UWW

==== Men's Greco-Roman 60 kg ====
Pos	Athlete	Pld	W	L	CP	TP	UKR	FRA	GER
1	Vladyslav Kuzko (UKR)	2	2	0	7	16	—	7–2	9–1
2	Lucas Lo Grasso (FRA)	2	1	1	4	8	1–3 PO1	—	6–2
3	Mark Wagner (GER)	2	0	2	2	3	1–4 SU1	1–3 PO1	—

Source: UWW

Pos	Athlete	Pld	W	L	CP	TP	FRA	DEN	GER
1	Ilian Ainaoui (FRA)	2	2	0	6	8	—	4–3	4–1
2	Brian Kurt Santiago (DEN)	2	1	1	4	12	1–3 PO1	—	9–4
3	Niklas Nimtz (GER)	2	0	2	2	5	1–3 PO1	1–3 PO1	—

Source: UWW

Semifinals
Vladyslav Kuzko (UKR)	5
Brian Kurt Santiago (DEN)	3
Lucas Lo Grasso (FRA)	1
Ilian Ainaoui (FRA)	2

Final
Vladyslav Kuzko (UKR)	4
Ilian Ainaoui (FRA)	2
Third place
Brian Kurt Santiago (DEN)	0
Lucas Lo Grasso (FRA)	9

==== Men's Greco-Roman 63 kg ====
Pos	Athlete	Pld	W	L	CP	TP	UKR	UWW
1	Maksym Liu (UKR)	1	1	0	3	7	—	7–0
2	Jamal Valizadeh (UWW)	1	0	1	0	0	0–3 PO	—

Source: UWW

Round 2
Jamal Valizadeh (UWW)	0
Maksym Liu (UKR)	7

==== Men's Greco-Roman 67 kg ====
Pos	Athlete	Pld	W	L	CP	TP	FRA	UKR	DEN
1	Yanis Nifri (FRA)	2	2	0	7	11	—	3–3	8–0
2	Oleksandr Hrushyn (UKR)	2	1	1	4	9	1–3 PO1	—	6–2
3	Magnus Rasmussen (DEN)	2	0	2	1	2	0–4 SU	1–3 PO1	—

Source: UWW

Pos	Athlete	Pld	W	L	CP	TP	DEN	GER	SUI
1	William Reenberg (DEN)	2	2	0	6	9	—	3–3	6–0
2	Marco Stoll (GER)	2	1	1	4	6	1–3 PO1	—	3–2
3	Saya Brunner (SUI)	2	0	2	1	2	0–3 PO	1–3 PO1	—

Source: UWW

Semifinals
Yanis Nifri (FRA)	3
Marco Stoll (GER)	1
Oleksandr Hrushyn (UKR)	2
William Reenberg (DEN)	1

Final
Yanis Nifri (FRA)
Oleksandr Hrushyn (UKR)	WO
Third place
Marco Stoll (GER)	6
William Reenberg (DEN)	10

==== Men's Greco-Roman 72 kg ====
Pos	Athlete	Pld	W	L	CP	TP	UKR	UKR	SUI	SUI	BEN
1	Dmytro Vasyliev (UKR)	4	4	0	15	30	—	3–2	8–0	8–0	11–1
2	Parviz Nasibov (UKR)	4	3	1	12	26	1–3 PO1	—	7–0	8–0	9–0
3	Andreas Vetsch (SUI)	4	2	2	6	11	0–4 SU	0–3 PO	—	3–1	8–1
4	Mathias Martinetti (SUI)	4	1	3	5	10	0–4 SU	0–4 SU	1–3 PO1	—	9–0
5	Yamine Atchiba (BEN)	4	0	4	2	2	1–4 SU1	0–4 SU	1–3 PO1	0–4 SU	—

Source: UWW

==== Men's Greco-Roman 77 kg ====
Round of 16
Irfan Mirzoiev (UKR)	WO
Ibrahim Ghanem (FRA)
Vilius Savickas (LTU)	5
Yao Lai-hsing (TPE)	3
Paulius Galkinas (LTU)	1
Naïm Bolaky-Meïte (FRA)	1
Andrii Kulyk (UKR)	3
Tigran Galustyan (FRA)	2
Rokas Čepauskas (LTU)	3
Fritz Reber (SUI)	11

Quarterfinals
Irfan Mirzoiev (UKR)	4^{F}
Vilius Savickas (LTU)	0
Naïm Bolaky-Meïte (FRA)	1
Hocine Akli Berc (FRA)	1
Andrii Kulyk (UKR)	8
Rasmus Ulriksen (DEN)	0
Fritz Reber (SUI)	3
Gagik Snjoyan (FRA)	3

Semifinals
Irfan Mirzoiev (UKR)	9
Naïm Bolaky-Meïte (FRA)	0
Andrii Kulyk (UKR)	5
Gagik Snjoyan (FRA)	0

Final
Irfan Mirzoiev (UKR)	4
Andrii Kulyk (UKR)	0

Repechage 1 of 4
Ibrahim Ghanem (FRA)
Yao Lai-hsing (TPE)	WO

Repechage 2 of 4
Yao Lai-hsing (TPE)	4
Fritz Reber (SUI)	5^{F}
Paulius Galkinas (LTU)	7
Rasmus Ulriksen (DEN)	6
Tigran Galustyan (FRA)	9
Hocine Akli Berc (FRA)	0
Rokas Čepauskas (LTU)	WO
Vilius Savickas (LTU)

Repechage 3 of 4
Fritz Reber (SUI)	1
Paulius Galkinas (LTU)	4
Tigran Galustyan (FRA)	3
Rokas Čepauskas (LTU)	3

Bronze medals
Paulius Galkinas (LTU)	3
Naïm Bolaky-Meïte (FRA)	1
Rokas Čepauskas (LTU)	WO
Gagik Snjoyan (FRA)

==== Men's Greco-Roman 82 kg ====
Pos	Athlete	Pld	W	L	CP	TP	BEL	TUN	FRA
1	Ibrahim Tabaev (BEL)	2	2	0	8	14	—	11–2 Fall	3–0
2	Sami Slama (TUN)	2	1	1	3	8	0–5 FA	—	6–1
3	Brandon Guiadem Kamdem (FRA)	2	0	2	1	1	0–3 PO	1–3 PO1	—

Source: UWW

Pos	Athlete	Pld	W	L	CP	TP	UKR	DEN	FRA
1	Ruslan Abdiiev (UKR)	2	2	0	7	12	—	3–1	9–0
2	Oliver Krüger (DEN)	2	1	1	4	6	1–3 PO1	—	5–2
3	Haik Sargsyan (FRA)	2	0	2	1	2	0–4 SU	1–3 PO1	—

Source: UWW

Semifinals
Ibrahim Tabaev (BEL)	10
Oliver Krüger (DEN)	0
Sami Slama (TUN)	0
Ruslan Abdiiev (UKR)	8

Final
Ibrahim Tabaev (BEL)	1
Ruslan Abdiiev (UKR)	3
Third place
Oliver Krüger (DEN)	9
Sami Slama (TUN)	1

==== Men's Greco-Roman 87 kg ====
Pos	Athlete	Pld	W	L	CP	TP	UKR	SUI	DEN	GER
1	Yaroslav Filchakov (UKR)	3	3	0	11	20	—	8–0	4–1	8–0
2	Damian von Euw (SUI)	3	2	1	8	3	0–4 SU	—	3–1	WO
3	Frederik Mathiesen (DEN)	3	1	2	7	4	1–3 PO1	1–3 PO1	—	2–4 Fall
4	Eric Löser (GER)	3	0	3	0	4	0–4 SU	0–5 IN	0–5 FA	—

Source: UWW

==== Men's Greco-Roman 97 kg ====
Pos	Athlete	Pld	W	L	CP	TP	UKR	GER	FRA
1	Yehor Yakushenko (UKR)	2	2	0	6	10	—	3–1	7–0
2	Anton Vieweg (GER)	2	1	1	4	4	1–3 PO1	—	3–0
3	Loïc Samen (FRA)	2	0	2	0	0	0–3 PO	0–3 PO	—

Source: UWW

Pos	Athlete	Pld	W	L	CP	TP	UKR	GER	DEN
1	Vladlen Kozlyuk (UKR)	2	2	0	8	16	—	8–0	8–0
2	Connor Sammet (GER)	2	1	1	3	4	0–4 SU	—	4–3
3	Jonas Johansen (DEN)	2	0	2	1	3	0–4 SU	1–3 PO1	—

Source: UWW

Semifinals
Yehor Yakushenko (UKR)	8
Connor Sammet (GER)	0
Anton Vieweg (GER)	0
Vladlen Kozlyuk (UKR)	8

Final
Yehor Yakushenko (UKR)
Vladlen Kozlyuk (UKR)	WO
Third place
Connor Sammet (GER)	0
Anton Vieweg (GER)	9

==== Men's Greco-Roman 130 kg ====
Pos	Athlete	Pld	W	L	CP	TP	UKR	LTU
1	Mykhailo Vyshnyvetskyi (UKR)	1	1	0	5	3	—	3–0 Ret
2	Mantas Knystautas (LTU)	1	0	1	0	0	0–5 IN	—

Source: UWW

Round 2
Mykhailo Vyshnyvetskyi (UKR)	WO
Mantas Knystautas (LTU)

=== Women's freestyle ===
==== Women's freestyle 50 kg ====
Pos	Athlete	Pld	W	L	CP	TP	ITA	FRA	ROU
1	Emanuela Liuzzi (ITA)	2	2	0	8	21	—	10–0	11–0
2	Joséphine Haemmerle (FRA)	2	1	1	5	2	0–4 SU	—	2–4 Fall
3	Ştefania Priceputu (ROU)	2	0	2	0	4	0–4 SU	0–5 FA	—

Source: UWW

==== Women's freestyle 53 kg ====
Pos	Athlete	Pld	W	L	CP	TP	FRA	FRA	FRA
1	Emma Luttenauer (FRA)	2	2	0	7	19	—	8–2	11–0
2	Tetiana Profatilova (FRA)	2	1	1	4	13	1–3 PO1	—	11–4
3	Maëlyss Rousselet (FRA)	2	0	2	1	4	0–4 SU	1–3 PO1	—

Source: UWW

==== Women's freestyle 55 kg ====
Pos	Athlete	Pld	W	L	CP	TP	ESP	USA	CIV	ITA	FIN
1	Carla Jaume (ESP)	4	4	0	18	25	—	12–4	4–3 Fall	9–0 Fall	WO
2	Alyssa Mahan (USA)	4	3	1	16	18	1–3 PO1	—	4–2 Fall	10–1 Fall	WO
3	Nogona Bakayoko (CIV)	4	2	2	8	13	0–5 FA	0–5 FA	—	8–7	WO
4	Angela Casarola (ITA)	4	1	3	6	8	0–5 FA	0–5 FA	1–3 PO1	—	WO
—	Jutta Ala-Ranta (FIN)	4	0	4	0	0	0–5 FO	0–5 FO	0–5 FO	0–5 FO	—

Source: UWW

==== Women's freestyle 57 kg ====
Pos	Athlete	Pld	W	L	CP	TP	ITA	FIN	FRA	FRA	FRA
1	Fabiana Rinella (ITA)	4	4	0	14	32	—	14–4	2–0	4–1	12–2
2	Jenna Hemiä (FIN)	4	3	1	14	19	1–4 SU1	—	6–1	4–0 Fall	5–0 Fall
3	Céleste Sion (FRA)	4	2	2	9	8	0–3 PO	1–3 PO1	—	3–1	4–0
4	Lilya Cohen (FRA)	4	1	3	5	5	1–3 PO1	0–5 FA	1–3 PO1	—	3–2
5	Laurie Lesaffre (FRA)	4	0	4	2	4	1–4 SU1	0–5 FA	0–3 PO	1–3 PO1	—

Source: UWW

==== Women's freestyle 59 kg ====
Pos	Athlete	Pld	W	L	CP	TP	ESP	ESP	CZE
1	Lydia Pérez (ESP)	2	2	0	8	20	—	10–0	10–0
2	Rosa Molina (ESP)	2	1	1	4	10	0–4 SU	—	10–0
3	Petra Mráčková (CZE)	2	0	2	0	0	0–4 SU	0–4 SU	—

Source: UWW

==== Women's freestyle 62 kg ====
Pos	Athlete	Pld	W	L	CP	TP	FRA	ITA	FRA	CZE
1	Améline Douarre (FRA)	3	3	0	15	10	—	4–0 Fall	2–0 Fall	4–0 Fall
2	Immacolata Danise (ITA)	3	2	1	8	20	0–5 FA	—	10–0	10–0
3	Iris Thiébaux (FRA)	3	1	2	4	12	0–5 FA	0–4 SU	—	12–1
4	Tereza Mráčková (CZE)	3	0	3	1	1	0–5 FA	0–4 SU	1–4 SU1	—

Source: UWW

==== Women's freestyle 65 kg ====
Pos	Athlete	Pld	W	L	CP	TP	USA	FIN	CZE
1	Madeline Kubicki (USA)	2	2	0	8	20	—	6–0 Fall	10–0 Fall
2	Silja Kamppinen (FIN)	2	1	1	4	10	0–5 FA	—	4–1
3	Anna Mazgajová (CZE)	2	0	2	0	0	0–5 FA	1–3 PO1	—

Source: UWW

==== Women's freestyle 68 kg ====
Pos	Athlete	Pld	W	L	CP	TP	FRA
1	Pauline Lecarpentier (FRA)	0	0	0	0	0	—

Source: UWW

==== Women's freestyle 76 kg ====
Pos	Athlete	Pld	W	L	CP	TP	FRA	ITA	ITA	ESP
1	Kendra Dacher (FRA)	3	3	0	14	26	—	6–0 Fall	10–0	10–0 Fall
2	Enrica Rinaldi (ITA)	3	2	1	6	13	0–5 FA	—	7–0	6–2
3	Fabiana Dattilo (ITA)	3	1	2	5	2	0–4 SU	0–3 PO	—	2–7 Ret
4	Carla Lera (ESP)	3	0	3	0	7	0–5 FA	1–3 PO1	0–5 IN	—

Source: UWW
