= Andrii Kulyk =

Ukrainian Greco-Roman wrestler

Personal information
- Native name: Андрій Олегович Кулик
- Full name: Andrii Olegovich Kulyk
- Nationality: Ukraine
- Born: December 18, 1998 (age 27) Kharkiv Oblast, Ukraine

Sport
- Country: Ukraine
- Sport: Amateur wrestling
- Weight class: 72 kg
- Event: Greco-Roman
Medal record
Greco-Roman wrestling
Representing Ukraine
World Championships
Bronze medal – third place	2022 Belgrade	72 kg
World Military Championships
Silver medal – second place	2025 Warendorf	77 kg
Dan Kolov & Nikola Petrov Tournament
Bronze medal – third place	2026 Plovdiv	77 kg
Grand Prix
Silver medal – second place	2026 Nice	77 kg
Bronze medal – third place	2022 Zagreb	72 kg
European U23 Championships
Silver medal – second place	2021 Skopje	72 kg
Representing All-World Team
World Cup
Bronze medal – third place	2022 Baku	Team

Andrii Kulyk (Ukrainian: Андрій Олегович Кулик; born 18 December 1998) is a Ukrainian wrestler. He is a bronze medallist of the World Wrestling Championships.

== Career ==
Kulyk's first senior international championship was the 2020 European Championships in Rome, Italy, where he lost in his very first bout against Hungary's Róbert Fritsch.

The following year was more successful for Kulyk. He won a silver medal at the 2021 European U23 Championship in Skopje, North Macedonia, where he lost in the final to Malkhas Amoyan from Armenia. He also participated at the 2021 U23 World Championships in Belgrade, Serbia, and managed to reach the quarterfinals (after defeating Francesco Bellino from Italy and Andrei Kavaleuski from Belarus, but losing to Shant Khachatryan from Armenia).

Kulyk participated at the 2022 World Wrestling Championships, being awarded a bronze medal in the men's Greco-Roman 72 kg event. Though he lost to the eventual World Champion Ali Arsalan representing Serbia, he first defeated Róbert Fritsch from Hungary and Kristupas Šleiva from Lithuania, and then narrowly won in the bronze medal bout against Ibrahim Ghanem from France. That season, Kulyk also won a bronze medal of the Grand Prix Zagreb Open, while his teammate and Olympic silver medallist Parviz Nasibov was victorious.
