= Sergey Kutuzov =

Russian Greco-Roman wrestler

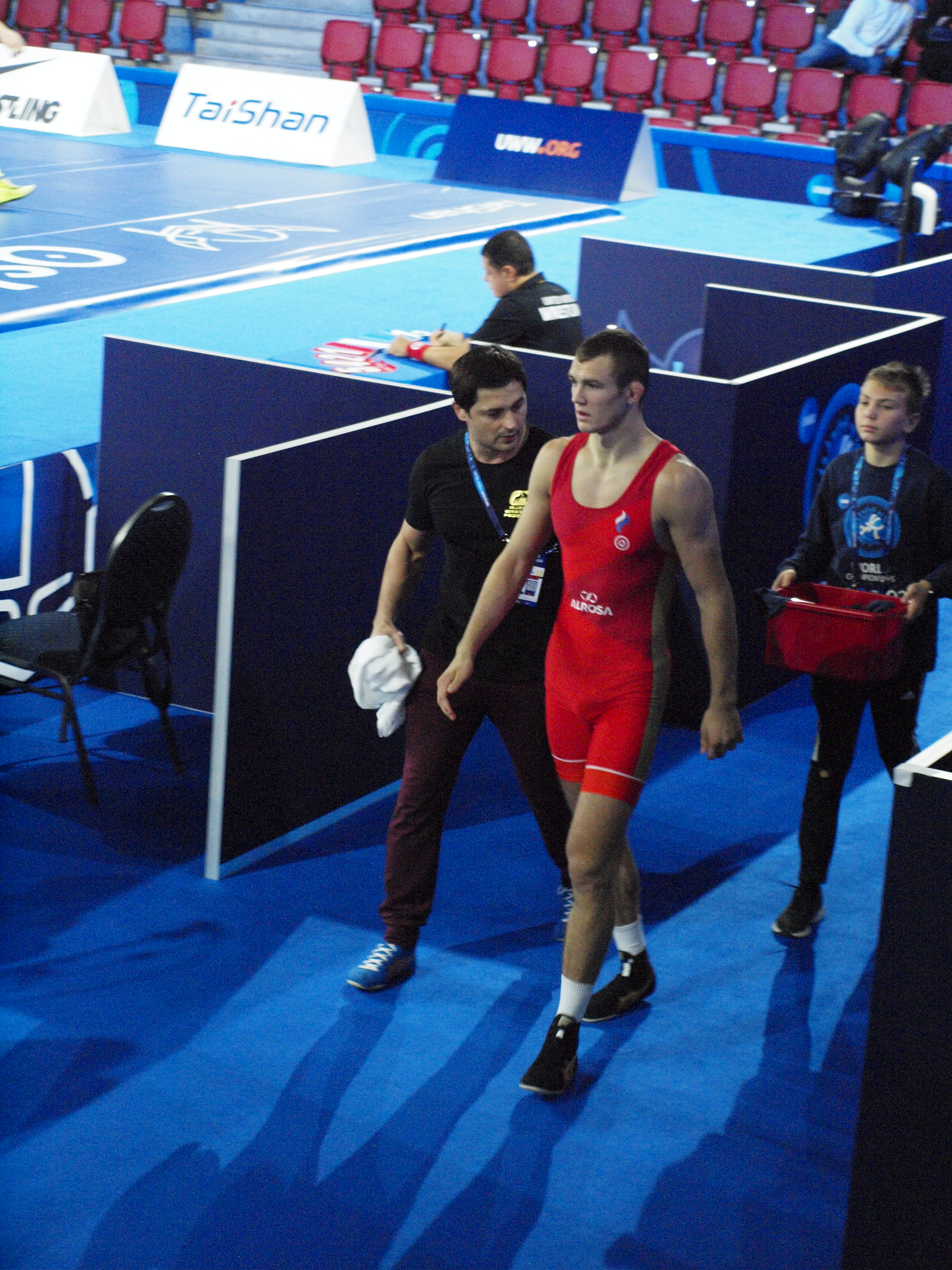
- 2021 World Wrestling Championships

Personal information
- Native name: Сергей Дмитриевич Кутузов
- Full name: Sergey Dmitriyevich Kutuzov
- Nationality: Russia
- Born: 9 April 1999 (age 27) Shakhty, Rostov Oblast, Russia

Sport
- Country: Russia
- Sport: Amateur wrestling
- Weight class: 72 kg
- Event: Greco-Roman
Medal record
Men's Greco-Roman wrestling
Representing United World Wrestling
Grand Prix
Gold medal – first place	2025 Budapest	77 kg
Representing Individual Neutral Athletes
Grand Prix
Bronze medal – third place	2025 Zagreb	77 kg
Representing Russian Wrestling Federation
World Championships
Silver medal – second place	2021 Oslo	72 kg
Representing Russia
World U23 Championships
Silver medal – second place	2021 Belgrade	72 kg
European U23 Championships
Bronze medal – third place	2021 Skopje	72 kg

Sergey Dmitriyevich Kutuzov (Russian: Сергей Дмитриевич Кутузов; born 9 April 1999) is a Russian Greco-Roman wrestler. He won the silver medal in the 72 kg event at the 2021 World Wrestling Championships held in Oslo, Norway.

At the 2021 U23 World Wrestling Championships held in Belgrade, Serbia, he won the silver medal in the 72 kg event.

He earned a quota place for the Individual Neutral Athletes for the 2024 Summer Olympics at the 2024 World Wrestling Olympic Qualification Tournament held in Istanbul, Turkey. In July 2024, the Russian Wrestling Federation announced that Russian wrestlers would not take part after a unanimous decision to refuse to participate.

== Achievements ==
Year	Tournament	Location	Result	Event
2021	World Championships	Oslo, Norway	2nd	Greco-Roman 72 kg
