= 2021 U23 World Wrestling Championships – Men's Greco-Roman 72 kg =

Greco-Roman event at World Wrestling Championship

The men's Greco-Roman 72 kilograms is a competition featured at the 2021 U23 World Wrestling Championships, and was held in Belgrade, Serbia on 2 and 3 November.

== Medalists ==
Gold	Idris Ibaev (GER)
Silver	Sergey Kutuzov (RUS)
Bronze	Shant Khachatryan (ARM)
Bronze	Ulvu Ganizade (AZE)

== Results ==
Legend

- F — Won by fall
- WO — Won by walkover

=== Final ===
Final
Idris Ibaev (GER)	3
Sergey Kutuzov (RUS)	1

=== Top half ===
Round of 32
Aron Pinter (SRB)	0
Andrei Kavaleuski (BLR)	8
Francesco Bellino (ITA)	0
Andrii Kulyk (UKR)	8

Round of 16
Erik Persson (SWE)	0
Idris Ibaev (GER)	10
Nate Moore (USA)	WO
~~Sheku Kassegbama (SLE)~~
Shant Khachatryan (ARM)	11
Jamol Jumabaev (UZB)	1
Andrei Kavaleuski (BLR)	0
Andrii Kulyk (UKR)	10

Quarterfinals
Idris Ibaev (GER)	12
Nate Moore (USA)	2
Shant Khachatryan (ARM)	7
Andrii Kulyk (UKR)	6

Semifinals
Idris Ibaev (GER)	9
Shant Khachatryan (ARM)	0

=== Bottom half ===
Round of 32
~~Joni Komppa (FIN)~~
Attila Tösmagi (HUN)	WO
Mihai Petic (MDA)	3
Pavel Puklavec (CRO)	5
Iigilik Satymkul Uulu (KGZ)	0
Ulvu Ganizade (AZE)	5
Vikas Dalal (IND)	9
Oliver Oláh (SVK)	0
Sergey Kutuzov (RUS)	9
Denis Mertl (CZE)	0
Abdullah Toprak (TUR)	3
Amir Abdi (IRI)	11
Marcos Sánchez-Silva (ESP)	9
Kevin Kupi (ALB)	1
Otar Abuladze (GEO)	9
Hassan Al-Harthi (KSA)	0

Round of 16
Attila Tösmagi (HUN)	5
Pavel Puklavec (CRO)	0
Ulvu Ganizade (AZE)	12
Vikas Dalal (IND)	7
Sergey Kutuzov (RUS)	9
Amir Abdi (IRI)	1
Marcos Sánchez-Silva (ESP)	0
Otar Abuladze (GEO)	9

Quarterfinals
Attila Tösmagi (HUN)	1
Ulvu Ganizade (AZE)	2
Sergey Kutuzov (RUS)	9^{F}
Otar Abuladze (GEO)	3

Semifinals
Ulvu Ganizade (AZE)	2
Sergey Kutuzov (RUS)	3

=== Repechage ===
Repechage round 1
Denis Mertl (CZE)	1
Amir Abdi (IRI)	9

Repechage round 2
Erik Persson (SWE)	11
Nate Moore (USA)	1
Amir Abdi (IRI)	9
Otar Abuladze (GEO)	0

Bronze medals
Erik Persson (SWE)	2
Shant Khachatryan (ARM)	6^{F}
Amir Abdi (IRI)	7
Ulvu Ganizade (AZE)	12
