= Matteo Pellicone Ranking Series 2022 =

- Host city: Rome, Italy
- Dates: 22–25 June 2022
- Stadium: PalaPellicone

Champions
- Freestyle: Azerbaijan
- Greco-Roman: Azerbaijan
- Women: Ukraine

The Matteo Pellicone Ranking Series 2022 was a wrestling event held in Ostia, Rome, Italy between 22 and 25 of June 2022. The third United World Wrestling Ranking Series event of the year, it featured multiple World and Olympic Champions, Pan-American Champions, European Champions, Asian Champions and NCAA Champions.

The United World Wrestling postponed the Matteo Pellicone. Despite the efforts of the Italian Wrestling Federation to host Rome's Matteo Pellicone on the previously scheduled dates of February 4–7, the latest restrictions due to the Omicron variant proved to be a roadblock in hosting the event. The tournament will now be held June 22–25 in Rome, Italy preceding the 2022 European Juniors Wrestling Championships, which begin June 27 at the Pala Pellicone.

== Competition schedule ==
All times are (UTC+2)

Date	Time	Event
22 June	10.30-14.30	Qualification rounds & repechage GR – 55-60-63-67-87-97-130 kg
22 June	18.00-20.30	Final matches and awarding ceremony: GR – 55-60-63-67-87-97-130 kg
23 June	10.30-14.30	Qualification rounds & repechage GR – 72-77-82 kg & WW – 57-62-68-76 kg
23 June	18.00-20.30	Final matches and awarding ceremony: Finals GR – 72-77-82 kg & WW – 57-62-68-76 kg
24 June	10.30-14.30	Qualification rounds & repechage WW – 50-53-55-59-65-72 kg & FS – 97–125 kg
24 June	18.00-20.30	Final matches and awarding ceremony: Finals WW – 50-53-55-59-65-72 kg & FS – 97–125 kg
25 June	10.30-14.30	Qualification rounds & repechage FS – 57-61-65-70-74-79-86-92 kg
25 June	18.00-20.30	Final matches and awarding ceremony: Finals FS – 57-61-65-70-74-79-86-92 kg

== Medal table ==
* Host nation (Italy)

Rank	Nation	Gold	Silver	Bronze	Total
1	Azerbaijan	8	5	5	18
2	Ukraine	6	5	2	13
3	Turkey	2	2	5	9
4	Hungary	2	1	5	8
5	United States	2	1	2	5
6	Slovakia	2	0	2	4
7	Georgia	1	3	4	8
7	Poland	1	3	4	8
9	Moldova	1	3	2	6
10	Iran	1	2	1	4
11	Canada	1	0	1	2
11	Lithuania	1	0	1	2
11	Norway	1	0	1	2
14	Puerto Rico	1	0	0	1
15	Romania	0	2	4	6
16	Germany	0	2	0	2
17	Italy*	0	1	1	2
18	Brazil	0	0	2	2
18	Nigeria	0	0	2	2
20	Austria	0	0	1	1
20	Finland	0	0	1	1
20	France	0	0	1	1
20	Israel	0	0	1	1
20	Sweden	0	0	1	1
Totals (24 entries)		30	30	49	109

== Team ranking ==
Rank	Men's freestyle		Men's Greco-Roman		Women's freestyle	
Rank	Team	Points	Team	Points	Team	Points
1	Azerbaijan	159	Azerbaijan	148	Ukraine	171
2	Georgia	145	Hungary	102	Poland	103
3	Turkey	114	Iran	98	United States	91
4	Ukraine	119	Turkey	86	Germany	69
5	Slovakia	80	Romania	61	Romania	61

== Medal overview ==
=== Men's freestyle ===
Event	Gold	Silver	Bronze
57 kg	Aliabbas Rzazade; Azerbaijan	Horst Lehr; Germany	Şaban Kızıltaş; Turkey
57 kg	Aliabbas Rzazade; Azerbaijan	Horst Lehr; Germany	Kamil Kerimov; Ukraine
61 kg	Recep Topal; Turkey	Andrii Dzhelep; Ukraine	Teimuraz Vanishvili; Georgia
61 kg	Recep Topal; Turkey	Andrii Dzhelep; Ukraine	Ahmet Taş; Turkey
65 kg	Sebastian Rivera; Puerto Rico	Erik Arushanian; Ukraine	Ali Rahimzade; Azerbaijan
65 kg	Sebastian Rivera; Puerto Rico	Erik Arushanian; Ukraine	Shamil Omarov; Italy
70 kg	Joshgun Azimov; Azerbaijan	Murad Evloev; Azerbaijan	Haji Aliyev; Azerbaijan
70 kg	Joshgun Azimov; Azerbaijan	Murad Evloev; Azerbaijan	Cüneyt Budak; Turkey
74 kg	Tajmuraz Salkazanov; Slovakia	Turan Bayramov; Azerbaijan	Mitch Finesilver; Israel
74 kg	Tajmuraz Salkazanov; Slovakia	Turan Bayramov; Azerbaijan	Khadzhimurad Gadzhiyev; Azerbaijan
79 kg	Vasyl Mykhailov; Ukraine	Iakub Shikhdzamalov; Romania	Vladimeri Gamkrelidze; Georgia
79 kg	Vasyl Mykhailov; Ukraine	Iakub Shikhdzamalov; Romania	Achsarbek Gulajev; Slovakia
86 kg	Abubakr Abakarov; Azerbaijan	Tarzan Maisuradze; Georgia	Zaur Beradze; Georgia
86 kg	Abubakr Abakarov; Azerbaijan	Tarzan Maisuradze; Georgia	Boris Makoev; Slovakia
92 kg	Osman Nurmagomedov; Azerbaijan	Miriani Maisuradze; Georgia	Erhan Yaylacı; Turkey
97 kg	Batyrbek Tsakulov; Slovakia	Givi Matcharashvili; Georgia	Elizbar Odikadze; Georgia
97 kg	Batyrbek Tsakulov; Slovakia	Givi Matcharashvili; Georgia	Vladislav Baitcaev; Hungary
125 kg	Geno Petriashvili; Georgia	Robert Baran; Poland	Oleksandr Khotsianivskyi; Ukraine
125 kg	Geno Petriashvili; Georgia	Robert Baran; Poland	Kamil Kościółek; Poland

=== Men's Greco-Roman ===
Event	Gold	Silver	Bronze
55 kg	Mohammad Panahisani; Iran	Florin Tița; Romania	Max Nowry; United States
60 kg	Murad Mammadov; Azerbaijan	Eldaniz Azizli; Azerbaijan	Nihat Mammadli; Azerbaijan
63 kg	Taleh Mammadov; Azerbaijan	Victor Ciobanu; Moldova	Răzvan Arnăut; Romania
67 kg	Hasrat Jafarov; Azerbaijan	Furkan Yıldız; Turkey	Mohammad Javad Rezaei; Iran
67 kg	Hasrat Jafarov; Azerbaijan	Furkan Yıldız; Turkey	Tigran Galustyan; France
72 kg	Kristupas Šleiva; Lithuania	Ulvu Ganizade; Azerbaijan	Selçuk Can; Turkey
72 kg	Kristupas Šleiva; Lithuania	Ulvu Ganizade; Azerbaijan	Valentin Petic; Moldova
77 kg	Zoltán Lévai; Hungary	Amin Kavianinejad; Iran	Róbert Fritsch; Hungary
77 kg	Zoltán Lévai; Hungary	Amin Kavianinejad; Iran	Albin Olofsson; Sweden
82 kg	Mihail Bradu; Moldova	Rasoul Garmsiri; Iran	Daniel Cataraga; Moldova
82 kg	Mihail Bradu; Moldova	Rasoul Garmsiri; Iran	Exauce Mukubu; Norway
87 kg	Islam Abbasov; Azerbaijan	Erik Szilvássy; Hungary	István Takács; Hungary
87 kg	Islam Abbasov; Azerbaijan	Erik Szilvássy; Hungary	Tamás Lévai; Hungary
97 kg	Dávid Losonczi; Hungary	Nikoloz Kakhelashvili; Italy	Arvi Savolainen; Finland
97 kg	Dávid Losonczi; Hungary	Nikoloz Kakhelashvili; Italy	Alex Szőke; Hungary
130 kg	Rıza Kayaalp; Turkey	Sabah Shariati; Azerbaijan	Beka Kandelaki; Azerbaijan
130 kg	Rıza Kayaalp; Turkey	Sabah Shariati; Azerbaijan	Mantas Knystautas; Lithuania

=== Women's freestyle ===
Event	Gold	Silver	Bronze
50 kg	Madison Parks; Canada	Agata Walerzak; Poland	Anna Łukasiak; Poland
53 kg	Liliia Malanchuk; Ukraine	Mariana Drăguțan; Moldova	Samantha Stewart; Canada
55 kg	Katarzyna Krawczyk; Poland	Mariia Vynnyk; Ukraine	Andreea Ana; Romania
57 kg	Alina Hrushyna; Ukraine	Elvira Kamaloğlu; Turkey	Giullia Penalber; Brazil
57 kg	Alina Hrushyna; Ukraine	Elvira Kamaloğlu; Turkey	Patrycja Gil; Poland
59 kg	Grace Bullen; Norway	Jowita Wrzesień; Poland	Abigail Nette; United States
59 kg	Grace Bullen; Norway	Jowita Wrzesień; Poland	Odunayo Adekuoroye; Nigeria
62 kg	Iryna Koliadenko; Ukraine	Ilona Prokopevniuk; Ukraine	Laís Nunes; Brazil
65 kg	Tetiana Rizhko; Ukraine	Emma Bruntil; United States	Kriszta Incze; Romania
68 kg	Alla Belinska; Ukraine	Irina Rîngaci; Moldova	Wiktoria Chołuj; Poland
68 kg	Alla Belinska; Ukraine	Irina Rîngaci; Moldova	Blessing Oborududu; Nigeria
72 kg	Skylar Grote; United States	Anna Schell; Germany	Alexandra Anghel; Romania
76 kg	Yelena Makoyed; United States	Anastasiya Alpyeyeva; Ukraine	Martina Kuenz; Austria

== Participating nations ==
270 wrestlers from 31 countries:

1. Austria (3)
2. Azerbaijan (28)
3. Brazil (7)
4. Canada (4)
5. Colombia (1)
6. Czech Republic (4)
7. Estonia (3)
8. Finland (2)
9. France (5)
10. Georgia (20)
11. Germany (10)
12. Greece (2)
13. Hungary (17)
14. Israel (1)
15. Iran (7)
16. Italy (17) (Host)
17. Latvia (2)
18. Lithuania (7)
19. Moldova (11)
20. Nigeria (2)
21. Norway (6)
22. Poland (13)
23. Puerto Rico (1)
24. Romania (15)
25. Serbia (1)
26. Sri Lanka (3)
27. Slovakia (6)
28. Sweden (6)
29. Turkey (27)
30. Ukraine (24)
31. United States (15)

== Results ==
=== Men's freestyle ===
==== Men's freestyle 57 kg ====
Legend

- F — Won by fall
- WO — Won by walkover

Round of 16
Şaban Kızıltaş (TUR)	4
Afgan Khashalov (AZE)	4

Quarterfinals
Horst Lehr (GER)	10
Şaban Kızıltaş (TUR)	4
Andriy Yatsenko (UKR)	11
Beka Bujiashvili (GEO)	13
Roberti Dingashvili (GEO)	8
Aliabbas Rzazade (AZE)	17
Mehmet Mevlüt Yüce (TUR)	0
Kamil Kerimov (UKR)	11

Semifinals
Horst Lehr (GER)	7^{F}
Beka Bujiashvili (GEO)	4
Aliabbas Rzazade (AZE)	10
Kamil Kerimov (UKR)	0

Final
Horst Lehr (GER)	3
Aliabbas Rzazade (AZE)	5

Bronze medals
Şaban Kızıltaş (TUR)	WO
Beka Bujiashvili (GEO)
Roberti Dingashvili (GEO)	1
Kamil Kerimov (UKR)	11

==== Men's freestyle 61 kg ====
Legend

- F — Won by fall

Round of 16
Tural Huseynov (AZE)	9
Teimuraz Vanishvili (GEO)	12

Quarterfinals
Andrii Dzhelep (UKR)	7
Teimuraz Vanishvili (GEO)	2
Taras Markovych (UKR)	5
Islam Bazarganov (AZE)	8
Adam Biboulatov (FRA)	3
Recep Topal (TUR)	13
Ahmet Taş (TUR)	13
Giorgi Goniashvili (GEO)	8

Semifinals
Andrii Dzhelep (UKR)	10
Islam Bazarganov (AZE)	0
Recep Topal (TUR)	8
Ahmet Taş (TUR)	3

Final
Andrii Dzhelep (UKR)	4
Recep Topal (TUR)	6

Bronze medals
Teimuraz Vanishvili (GEO)	7
Islam Bazarganov (AZE)	3
Adam Biboulatov (FRA)	3
Ahmet Taş (TUR)	9

==== Men's freestyle 65 kg ====
Legend

- F — Won by fall
- R — Retired

Round of 16
Ali Rahimzade (AZE)	10
Daniel Pucino (ITA)	5
Hamza Alaca (TUR)	10
Tornike Katamadze (GEO)	6
Vasyl Shuptar (UKR)	7^{F}
Beka Lomtadze (GEO)	0

Quarterfinals
Arman Eloyan (FRA)	0
Ali Rahimzade (AZE)	6
Nikolai Okhlopkov (ROU)	1
Erik Arushanian (UKR)	10^{F}
Sebastian Rivera (PUR)	10
Hamza Alaca (TUR)	8
Vasyl Shuptar (UKR)	2
Shamil Omarov (ITA)	5

Semifinals
Ali Rahimzade (AZE)	0
Erik Arushanian (UKR)	10
Sebastian Rivera (PUR)	5
Shamil Omarov (ITA)	4

Final
Erik Arushanian (UKR)	9
Sebastian Rivera (PUR)	14

Bronze medals
Nikolai Okhlopkov (ROU)	1
Ali Rahimzade (AZE)	4
Hamza Alaca (TUR)	0^{R}
Shamil Omarov (ITA)	4

==== Men's freestyle 70 kg ====
Legend

- F — Won by fall
- WO — Won by walkover

Round of 16
Joshgun Azimov (AZE)	2
Servet Coşkun (TUR)	1
Ihor Nykyforuk (UKR)	5
Haji Aliyev (AZE)	7^{F}
Murad Evloev (AZE)	7
Cüneyt Budak (TUR)	3
Pavel Graur (MDA)	6
Marwane Yezza (FRA)	5

Quarterfinals
Zurabi Iakobishvili (GEO)	3
Joshgun Azimov (AZE)	4
Haji Aliyev (AZE)	10
Daniel Chomanič (SVK)	0
Gianluca Talamo (ITA)	3
Murad Evloev (AZE)	11^{F}
Pavel Graur (MDA)	5^{F}
Gianluca Coletti (ITA)	0

Semifinals
Joshgun Azimov (AZE)	WO
Haji Aliyev (AZE)
Murad Evloev (AZE)	5
Pavel Graur (MDA)	3

Final
Joshgun Azimov (AZE)	6
Murad Evloev (AZE)	1

Repechage round 1
Servet Coşkun (TUR)	10
Zurabi Iakobishvili (GEO)	5
Cüneyt Budak (TUR)	11
Gianluca Talamo (ITA)	0

Bronze medals
Servet Coşkun (TUR)	3
Haji Aliyev (AZE)	4
Cüneyt Budak (TUR)	6
Pavel Graur (MDA)	0

==== Men's freestyle 74 kg ====
Legend

- F — Won by fall
- WO — Won by walkover

Round of 16
Turan Bayramov (AZE)	2
Mitch Finesilver (ISR)	1
César Alvan (BRA)	9
Dzhabrail Gadzhiev (AZE)	14
Zurab Kapraev (ROU)	2
Vasile Diacon (MDA)	3
Tajmuraz Salkazanov (SVK)	3
Khadzhimurad Gadzhiyev (AZE)	2
Fazlı Eryılmaz (TUR)	9
Maxim Vasilioglo (ROU)	4

Quarterfinals
Otari Bagauri (GEO)	0
Turan Bayramov (AZE)	10
Dzhabrail Gadzhiev (AZE)	2
Vasile Diacon (MDA)	2
Dimitri Jioevi (GEO)	1
Tajmuraz Salkazanov (SVK)	7
Fazlı Eryılmaz (TUR)	8
Zielimkhan Tohuzov (UKR)	3

Semifinals
Turan Bayramov (AZE)	5
Dzhabrail Gadzhiev (AZE)	3
Tajmuraz Salkazanov (SVK)	WO
Fazlı Eryılmaz (TUR)

Final
Turan Bayramov (AZE)	0
Tajmuraz Salkazanov (SVK)	4

Repechage round 1
Mitch Finesilver (ISR)	10
Otari Bagauri (GEO)	3
Khadzhimurad Gadzhiyev (AZE)	12
Dimitri Jioevi (GEO)	2

Bronze medals
Mitch Finesilver (ISR)	6
Dzhabrail Gadzhiev (AZE)	4
Khadzhimurad Gadzhiyev (AZE)	WO
Fazlı Eryılmaz (TUR)

==== Men's freestyle 79 kg ====
Legend

- F — Won by fall

Round of 16
Ashraf Ashirov (AZE)	3
Evsem Shvelidze (GEO)	3
Vasyl Mykhailov (UKR)	8
Vladimeri Gamkrelidze (GEO)	3
Georgios Kougioumtsidis (GRE)	12
Nestor Tafur (COL)	1
Achsarbek Gulajev (SVK)	2
Iakub Shikhdzamalov (ROU)	6
Giorgi Sulava (GEO)	7
Muhammet Akdeniz (TUR)	9

Quarterfinals
Alans Amirovs (LAT)	2
Evsem Shvelidze (GEO)	9
Vasyl Mykhailov (UKR)	10
Georgios Kougioumtsidis (GRE)	0
Gadzhimurad Omarov (AZE)	1
Iakub Shikhdzamalov (ROU)	3
Muhammet Akdeniz (TUR)	4
Jakub Sýkora (SVK)	4

Semifinals
Evsem Shvelidze (GEO)	3
Vasyl Mykhailov (UKR)	6
Iakub Shikhdzamalov (ROU)	3
Muhammet Akdeniz (TUR)	2

Final
Vasyl Mykhailov (UKR)	7
Iakub Shikhdzamalov (ROU)	2

Repechage round 1
Vladimeri Gamkrelidze (GEO)	10
Georgios Kougioumtsidis (GRE)	5
Achsarbek Gulajev (SVK)	3
Gadzhimurad Omarov (AZE)	2

Bronze medals
Vladimeri Gamkrelidze (GEO)	4
Evsem Shvelidze (GEO)	1
Achsarbek Gulajev (SVK)	11
Muhammet Akdeniz (TUR)	0

==== Men's freestyle 86 kg ====
Legend

- F — Won by fall
- WO — Won by walkover

Round of 16
Tarzan Maisuradze (GEO)	9
Orkhan Abasov (AZE)	1
Georgii Rubaev (MDA)	3
Abubakr Abakarov (AZE)	6
Boris Makoev (SVK)	6
Sandro Aminashvili (GEO)	4

Quarterfinals
Zaur Beradze (GEO)	4
Tarzan Maisuradze (GEO)	5
Mukhammed Aliiev (UKR)	8
Lars Schaefle (GER)	5
Ivars Samušonoks (LAT)	0
Abubakr Abakarov (AZE)	10
Boris Makoev (SVK)	5
Khasan Zakariiev (UKR)	4

Semifinals
Tarzan Maisuradze (GEO)	15
Mukhammed Aliiev (UKR)	5
Abubakr Abakarov (AZE)	8
Boris Makoev (SVK)	6

Final
Tarzan Maisuradze (GEO)	2
Abubakr Abakarov (AZE)	3

Repechage round 1
Orkhan Abasov (AZE)	2
Zaur Beradze (GEO)	7
Georgii Rubaev (MDA)	2
Ivars Samušonoks (LAT)	6

Bronze medals
Zaur Beradze (GEO)	WO
Mukhammed Aliiev (UKR)
Ivars Samušonoks (LAT)
Boris Makoev (SVK)	WO

==== Men's freestyle 92 kg ====
24 June

Pos	Athlete	Pld	W	L	CP	TP	TUR	GEO	MDA
1	Erhan Yaylacı (TUR)	2	2	0	7	18	—	11–0	7–0
2	Saba Chikhradze (GEO)	2	1	1	3	8	0–4 VSU	—	8–0
3	Andrian Grosul (MDA)	2	0	2	0	0	0–3 VPO	0–3 VPO	—

Source: UWW

Pos	Athlete	Pld	W	L	CP	TP	AZE	GEO	AUT
1	Osman Nurmagomedov (AZE)	2	2	0	7	20	—	10–1	10–0
2	Miriani Maisuradze (GEO)	2	1	1	5	12	1–3 VPO1	—	11–0
3	Benjamin Greil (AUT)	2	0	2	0	0	0–4 VSU	0–4 VSU	—

Source: UWW

Semifinals
Erhan Yaylacı (TUR)	4
Miriani Maisuradze (GEO)	6
Osman Nurmagomedov (AZE)	10
Saba Chikhradze (GEO)	0

Final
Miriani Maisuradze (GEO)
Osman Nurmagomedov (AZE)	WO
Bronze medal
Erhan Yaylacı (TUR)	8
Saba Chikhradze (GEO)	4

==== Men's freestyle 97 kg ====
Legend

- F — Won by fall
- WO — Won by walkover

Round of 16
Erik Thiele (GER)	3
Mustafa Sessiz (TUR)	1
Magomedkhan Magomedov (AZE)	10
Radu Lefter (MDA)	0
Vladislav Baitcaev (HUN)	9
Givi Matcharashvili (GEO)	14
Batyrbek Tsakulov (SVK)	WO
Radosław Baran (POL)
Zbigniew Baranowski (POL)	7
Mahamed Zakariiev (UKR)	0

Quarterfinals
Nishan Randhawa (CAN)	0
Erik Thiele (GER)	10
Magomedkhan Magomedov (AZE)	0
Givi Matcharashvili (GEO)	10
Elizbar Odikadze (GEO)	4
Batyrbek Tsakulov (SVK)	8
Zbigniew Baranowski (POL)	8
Ben Honis (ITA)	2

Semifinals
Erik Thiele (GER)	1
Givi Matcharashvili (GEO)	11
Batyrbek Tsakulov (SVK)	10
Zbigniew Baranowski (POL)	0

Final
Givi Matcharashvili (GEO)	4
Batyrbek Tsakulov (SVK)	10

Repechage round 1
Vladislav Baitcaev (HUN)	WO
Magomedkhan Magomedov (AZE)
Radosław Baran (POL)
Elizbar Odikadze (GEO)	WO

Bronze medals
Vladislav Baitcaev (HUN)	4
Erik Thiele (GER)	0
Elizbar Odikadze (GEO)	9
Zbigniew Baranowski (POL)	3

==== Men's freestyle 125 kg ====
Legend

- F — Won by fall
- R — Retired
- WO — Won by walkover

Round of 16
Gennadij Cudinovic (GER)	0
Geno Petriashvili (GEO)	11

Quarterfinals
Azamat Khosonov (GRE)	1
Geno Petriashvili (GEO)	12
Oleksandr Khotsianivskyi (UKR)	7
Aleksander Koldovski (UKR)	0
Robert Baran (POL)	1
Anıl Kılıçsallayan (TUR)	0^{R}
Kamil Kościółek (POL)	5
Johannes Ludescher (AUT)	0

Semifinals
Geno Petriashvili (GEO)	9
Oleksandr Khotsianivskyi (UKR)	2
Robert Baran (POL)	2
Kamil Kościółek (POL)	1

Final
Geno Petriashvili (GEO)	6
Robert Baran (POL)	0

Repechage round 1
Gennadij Cudinovic (GER)	10
Azamat Khosonov (GRE)	6

Bronze medals
Gennadij Cudinovic (GER)	0
Oleksandr Khotsianivskyi (UKR)	11
Anıl Kılıçsallayan (TUR)
Kamil Kościółek (POL)	WO

=== Men's Greco-Roman ===
==== Men's Greco-Roman 55 kg ====
22 June

Pos	Athlete	Pld	W	L	CP	TP	IRI	ROU	USA
1	Mohammad Panahisani (IRI)	2	1	1	4	15	—	11–7	4–5
2	Florin Tița (ROU)	2	1	1	4	9	1–3 VPO1	—	2–0
3	Max Nowry (USA)	2	1	1	3	5	3–1 VPO1	0–3 VPO	—

Source: UWW

==== Men's Greco-Roman 60 kg ====
22 June

Pos	Athlete	Pld	W	L	CP	TP	AZE	AZE	TUR	USA
1	Murad Mammadov (AZE)	3	3	0	11	30	—	7–1	14–1	9–0
2	Nihat Mammadli (AZE)	3	2	1	8	21	1–3 VPO1	—	11–0	9–4
3	Ekrem Öztürk (TUR)	3	1	2	4	6	1–4 VSU1	0–4 VSU	—	5–2
4	Ildar Hafizov (USA)	3	0	3	2	6	0–4 VSU	1–3 VPO1	1–3 VPO1	—

Source: UWW

Pos	Athlete	Pld	W	L	CP	TP	AZE	EST	ROU
1	Eldaniz Azizli (AZE)	2	2	0	8	18	—	8–0	10–2
2	Helary Mägisalu (EST)	2	1	1	4	6	0–4 VSU	—	4–4
3	Teodor Horătău (ROU)	2	0	2	1	4	1–4 VSU1	1–3 VPO1	—

Source: UWW

Semifinals
Murad Mammadov (AZE)	9
Helary Mägisalu (EST)	4
Eldaniz Azizli (AZE)	9
Nihat Mammadli (AZE)	0

Final
Murad Mammadov (AZE)	9
Eldaniz Azizli (AZE)	1
Bronze medal
Helary Mägisalu (EST)	0
Nihat Mammadli (AZE)	10

==== Men's Greco-Roman 63 kg ====
22 June

Pos	Athlete	Pld	W	L	CP	TP	MDA	AZE	USA
1	Victor Ciobanu (MDA)	2	2	0	9	16	—	7–0 Fall	9–0
2	Taleh Mammadov (AZE)	2	1	1	0	0	0–5 VFA	—	10–0
3	Jesse Thielke (USA)	2	0	2	0	0	0–4 VSU	0–4 VSU	—

Source: UWW

Pos	Athlete	Pld	W	L	CP	TP	ROU	LTU	HUN
1	Răzvan Arnăut (ROU)	2	2	0	6	18	—	11–4	7–5
2	Justas Petravičius (LTU)	2	1	1	5	13	1–3 VPO1	—	9–0
3	Krisztián Kecskeméti (HUN)	2	0	2	1	5	1–3 VPO1	0–4 VSU	—

Source: UWW

Semifinals
Victor Ciobanu (MDA)	12
Justas Petravičius (LTU)	5
Răzvan Arnăut (ROU)	1
Taleh Mammadov (AZE)	4

Final
Victor Ciobanu (MDA)	2
Taleh Mammadov (AZE)	4
Bronze medal
Justas Petravičius (LTU)
Răzvan Arnăut (ROU)	WO

==== Men's Greco-Roman 67 kg ====
Legend

- F — Won by fall

Round of 16
Giovanni Alessio (ITA)	1
Morten Thoresen (NOR)	12
Hasrat Jafarov (AZE)	8
Erik Torba (HUN)	0
Sajjad Imentalab (IRI)	0
Tigran Galustyan (FRA)	10
Mihai Mihuț (ROU)	5
Furkan Yıldız (TUR)	6

Quarterfinals
Mohammad Javad Rezaei (IRI)	2
Morten Thoresen (NOR)	1
Hasrat Jafarov (AZE)	9
Niklas Öhlén (SWE)	0
Alejandro Sancho (USA)	0
Tigran Galustyan (FRA)	8
Furkan Yıldız (TUR)	9
Kenedy Pedrosa (BRA)	0

Semifinals
Mohammad Javad Rezaei (IRI)	3
Hasrat Jafarov (AZE)	8
Tigran Galustyan (FRA)	0
Furkan Yıldız (TUR)	8

Final
Hasrat Jafarov (AZE)	9
Furkan Yıldız (TUR)	0

Repechage round 1
Erik Torba (HUN)	2
Niklas Öhlén (SWE)	4
Mihai Mihuț (ROU)	3
Kenedy Pedrosa (BRA)	1

Bronze medals
Niklas Öhlén (SWE)	2
Mohammad Javad Rezaei (IRI)	7
Mihai Mihuț (ROU)	1
Tigran Galustyan (FRA)	3

==== Men's Greco-Roman 72 kg ====
Legend

- F — Won by fall

Round of 16
Filippo Biondi (ITA)	0
Matias Lipasti (FIN)	8
István Váncza (HUN)	1
Ulvu Ganizade (AZE)	5

Quarterfinals
Mamadassa Sylla (FRA)	1
Matias Lipasti (FIN)	4
Kristupas Šleiva (LTU)	9
Selçuk Can (TUR)	0
~~Pat Smith (USA)~~
Håvard Jørgensen (NOR)	WO
Ulvu Ganizade (AZE)	5
Valentin Petic (MDA)	1

Semifinals
Matias Lipasti (FIN)	3
Kristupas Šleiva (LTU)	9^{F}
Håvard Jørgensen (NOR)	1
Ulvu Ganizade (AZE)	3

Final
Kristupas Šleiva (LTU)	WO
Ulvu Ganizade (AZE)

Repechage round 1
István Váncza (HUN)	1
Valentin Petic (MDA)	2

Bronze medals
Selçuk Can (TUR)	9
Matias Lipasti (FIN)	0
Valentin Petic (MDA)	3
Håvard Jørgensen (NOR)	1

==== Men's Greco-Roman 77 kg ====
Legend

- F — Won by fall

Round of 16
Róbert Fritsch (HUN)	5
Kamal Bey (USA)	1

Quarterfinals
Abdurrahman Kalkan (TUR)	3
Róbert Fritsch (HUN)	4
Zoltán Lévai (HUN)	10
Joílson Júnior (BRA)	1
Paulius Galkinas (LTU)	1
Luca Dariozzi (ITA)	5
Amin Kavianinejad (IRI)	5
Albin Olofsson (SWE)	4

Semifinals
Róbert Fritsch (HUN)	1
Zoltán Lévai (HUN)	8
Luca Dariozzi (ITA)	1
Amin Kavianinejad (IRI)	5

Final
Zoltán Lévai (HUN)	4
Amin Kavianinejad (IRI)	0

Bronze medals
Joílson Júnior (BRA)	0
Róbert Fritsch (HUN)	9
Albin Olofsson (SWE)	6
Luca Dariozzi (ITA)	2

==== Men's Greco-Roman 82 kg ====
Legend

- F — Won by fall
- C — Won by 3 cautions given to the opponent

Quarterfinals		Semifinals		Final
Rasoul Garmsiri (IRI)	6
Daniel Cataraga (MDA)	5	Rasoul Garmsiri (IRI)	9
Spencer Woods (USA)	4	Matteo Maffezzoli (ITA)	0
Matteo Maffezzoli (ITA)	5			Rasoul Garmsiri (IRI)	1
Mihail Bradu (MDA)	7			Mihail Bradu (MDA)	2
Exauce Mukubu (NOR)	6	Mihail Bradu (MDA)	6
Hasan Berk Kılınç (TUR)	7	Oldřich Varga (CZE)	2
Oldřich Varga (CZE)	7^{C}

Bronze medals
Daniel Cataraga (MDA)	3
Matteo Maffezzoli (ITA)	0
Exauce Mukubu (NOR)	2
Oldřich Varga (CZE)	1

==== Men's Greco-Roman 87 kg ====
Legend

- F — Won by fall

Round of 16
Hossein Nouri (IRI)	8
Mehmet Ali Küçükosman (TUR)	0
Alan Vera (USA)	0
István Takács (HUN)	4
Ranet Kaljola (EST)	0
Islam Abbasov (AZE)	5
Simone Fidelbo (ITA)	1
Erik Szilvássy (HUN)	8
Tamás Lévai (HUN)	4
Nicu Ojog (ROU)	3

Quarterfinals
Alex Bjurgberg Kessidis (SWE)	9
Hossein Nouri (IRI)	7
István Takács (HUN)	4
Islam Abbasov (AZE)	10
Zakarias Berg (SWE)	0
Erik Szilvássy (HUN)	5
Tamás Lévai (HUN)	5
Emincan Enez (TUR)	1

Semifinals
Alex Bjurgberg Kessidis (SWE)	0^{R}
Islam Abbasov (AZE)	2
Erik Szilvássy (HUN)	2
Tamás Lévai (HUN)	1

Final
Islam Abbasov (AZE)	1
Erik Szilvássy (HUN)	1

Repechage round 1
Ranet Kaljola (EST)	8
István Takács (HUN)	9
Simone Fidelbo (ITA)	0
Zakarias Berg (SWE)	6

Bronze medals
István Takács (HUN)	WO
Alex Bjurgberg Kessidis (SWE)
Zakarias Berg (SWE)	1
Tamás Lévai (HUN)	9

==== Men's Greco-Roman 97 kg ====
Legend

- F — Won by fall

Final

Final
Dávid Losonczi (HUN)	2
Nikoloz Kakhelashvili (ITA)	1

Top half

Round of 32
Felix Baldauf (NOR)	2
Aleksandar Stjepanetic (SWE)	5

Round of 16
Dávid Losonczi (HUN)	5
Vilius Laurinaitis (LTU)	0
Aleksandar Stjepanetic (SWE)	4
Luca Svaicari (ITA)	0
Mikheil Kajaia (SRB)	5
İbrahim Tığcı (TUR)	1
Arvi Savolainen (FIN)	8
Ondřej Dadák (CZE)	0

Quarterfinals
Dávid Losonczi (HUN)	6
Aleksandar Stjepanetic (SWE)	0
Mikheil Kajaia (SRB)	0
Arvi Savolainen (FIN)	4

Semifinals
Dávid Losonczi (HUN)	5
Arvi Savolainen (FIN)	0

Bottom half

Round of 32
Beytullah Kayışdağ (TUR)	1
Alex Szőke (HUN)	5

Round of 16
Mindaugas Venckaitis (LTU)	0
Nikoloz Kakhelashvili (ITA)	3
Igor Queiroz (BRA)	0
Mehdi Bali (IRI)	9
Artur Omarov (CZE)	1
Alex Szőke (HUN)	3
Murat Lokyaev (AZE)	0
Arif Niftulleyev (AZE)	2

Quarterfinals
Nikoloz Kakhelashvili (ITA)	5
Mehdi Bali (IRI)	4
Alex Szőke (HUN)	3
Arif Niftulleyev (AZE)	1

Semifinals
Nikoloz Kakhelashvili (ITA)	1
Alex Szőke (HUN)	1

Repechage round 1
Vilius Laurinaitis (LTU)	3
Aleksandar Stjepanetic (SWE)	3
Mindaugas Venckaitis (LTU)	1
Mehdi Bali (IRI)	4

Bronze medals
Aleksandar Stjepanetic (SWE)	0
Arvi Savolainen (FIN)	8
Mehdi Bali (IRI)	4
Alex Szőke (HUN)	7

==== Men's Greco-Roman 130 kg ====
Legend

- F — Won by fall

Round of 16
Sabah Shariati (AZE)	8
Dáriusz Vitek (HUN)	0
Alin Alexuc-Ciurariu (ROU)	0
Mantas Knystautas (LTU)	2

Quarterfinals
Cohlton Schultz (USA)	0
Sabah Shariati (AZE)	10
Beka Kandelaki (AZE)	4
Romas Fridrikas (LTU)	0
Danila Sotnikov (ITA)	1
Oskar Marvik (NOR)	3
Mantas Knystautas (LTU)	1
Rıza Kayaalp (TUR)	3

Semifinals
Sabah Shariati (AZE)	1
Beka Kandelaki (AZE)	1
Oskar Marvik (NOR)	1
Rıza Kayaalp (TUR)	2

Final
Sabah Shariati (AZE)	0
Rıza Kayaalp (TUR)	4

Repechage round 1
Dáriusz Vitek (HUN)	2
Cohlton Schultz (USA)	4

Bronze medals
Cohlton Schultz (USA)	2
Beka Kandelaki (AZE)	4
Mantas Knystautas (LTU)	6
Oskar Marvik (NOR)	3

=== Women's freestyle ===
==== Women's freestyle 50 kg ====
Legend

- F — Won by fall
- WO — Won by walkover

24 June

Pos	Athlete	Pld	W	L	CP	TP	CAN	POL	TUR
1	Madison Parks (CAN)	2	2	0	7	19	—	10–0	9–0
2	Agata Walerzak (POL)	2	1	1	3	4	0–4 VSU	—	4–2
3	Emine Çataloğlu (TUR)	2	0	2	1	2	0–3 VPO	1–3 VPO1	—

Source: UWW

Pos	Athlete	Pld	W	L	CP	TP	POL	TUR	SRI
1	Anna Łukasiak (POL)	2	2	0	8	11	—	11–3	WO
2	Zehra Demirhan (TUR)	2	1	1	6	3	1–3 VPO1	—	WO
—	Shriyanthika Pedige (SRI)	2	0	2	0	0	0–5 VFO	0–5 VFO	—

Source: UWW

Semifinals
Madison Parks (CAN)	5
Zehra Demirhan (TUR)	2
Anna Łukasiak (POL)	3
Agata Walerzak (POL)	5

Final
Madison Parks (CAN)	10
Agata Walerzak (POL)	8
Bronze medal
Zehra Demirhan (TUR)	1
Anna Łukasiak (POL)	2

==== Women's freestyle 53 kg ====
Legend

- F — Won by fall

24 June

Pos	Athlete	Pld	W	L	CP	TP	CAN	HUN	ITA
1	Samantha Stewart (CAN)	2	2	0	10	14	—	10–0 Fall	4–0 Fall
2	Szimonetta Szekér (HUN)	2	1	1	4	12	0–5 VFA	—	12–2
3	Oriana Di Stefano (ITA)	2	0	2	1	2	0–5 VFA	1–4 VSU1	—

Source: UWW

Pos	Athlete	Pld	W	L	CP	TP	UKR	MDA	SRI
1	Liliia Malanchuk (UKR)	2	2	0	8	3	—	3–2	WO
2	Mariana Drăguțan (MDA)	2	1	1	6	2	1–3 VPO1	—	WO
—	Chamodya Don (SRI)	2	0	2	0	0	0–5 VFO	0–5 VFO	—

Source: UWW

Semifinals
Samantha Stewart (CAN)	1
Mariana Drăguțan (MDA)	8^{F}
Szimonetta Szekér (HUN)	6
Liliia Malanchuk (UKR)	12

Final
Mariana Drăguțan (MDA)	2
Liliia Malanchuk (UKR)	6
Bronze medal
Samantha Stewart (CAN)	10
Szimonetta Szekér (HUN)	0

==== Women's freestyle 55 kg ====
Legend

- F — Won by fall
- WO — Won by walkover

24 June

Pos	Athlete	Pld	W	L	CP	TP	ROU	GER	ITA
1	Andreea Ana (ROU)	2	2	0	8	12	—	4–2	8–0 Fall
2	Nina Hemmer (GER)	2	1	1	5	12	1–3 VPO1	—	10–0
3	Alice Bevilacqua (ITA)	2	0	2	0	0	0–5 VFA	0–4 VSU	—

Source: UWW

Pos	Athlete	Pld	W	L	CP	TP	POL	UKR	SRI
1	Katarzyna Krawczyk (POL)	2	2	0	8	9	—	9–0	WO
2	Mariia Vynnyk (UKR)	2	1	1	5	0	0–3 VPO	—	WO
—	Nethmi Poruthotage (SRI)	2	0	2	0	0	0–5 VFO	0–5 VFO	—

Source: UWW

Semifinals
Andreea Ana (ROU)	4
Mariia Vynnyk (UKR)	6
Katarzyna Krawczyk (POL)	6
Nina Hemmer (GER)	0

Final
Mariia Vynnyk (UKR)	2
Katarzyna Krawczyk (POL)	7
Bronze medal
Andreea Ana (ROU)	4
Nina Hemmer (GER)	3

==== Women's freestyle 57 kg ====
Legend

- F — Won by fall

Quarterfinals		Semifinals		Final
Alina Hrushyna (UKR)	10^{F}
Erika Bognár (HUN)	0	Alina Hrushyna (UKR)	8^{F}
Giullia Penalber (BRA)	11	Giullia Penalber (BRA)	0
Sandra Paruszewski (GER)	4			Alina Hrushyna (UKR)	11
Amanda Martinez (USA)	1			Elvira Kamaloğlu (TUR)	1
Patrycja Gil (POL)	10	Patrycja Gil (POL)	2
Tamara Dollák (HUN)	0	Elvira Kamaloğlu (TUR)	3^{F}
Elvira Kamaloğlu (TUR)	10

Bronze medals
Erika Bognár (HUN)	0
Giullia Penalber (BRA)	6^{F}
Tamara Dollák (HUN)	2
Patrycja Gil (POL)	12^{F}

==== Women's freestyle 59 kg ====
Legend

- F — Won by fall
- WO — Won by walkover

Round of 16
Abigail Nette (USA)	WO
Kateryna Zydaczewska (ROU)
Jowita Wrzesień (POL)	6
Elena Brugger (GER)	2

Quarterfinals
Magdalena Głodek (POL)	7
Abigail Nette (USA)	8
Nikolett Szabó (HUN)	0
Grace Bullen (NOR)	13^{F}
Odunayo Adekuoroye (NGR)	10
Solomiia Vynnyk (UKR)	6
Jowita Wrzesień (POL)	8^{F}
Nairomi Sperandio (ITA)	0

Semifinals
Abigail Nette (USA)	0
Grace Bullen (NOR)	10
Odunayo Adekuoroye (NGR)	3
Jowita Wrzesień (POL)	9

Final
Grace Bullen (NOR)	12
Jowita Wrzesień (POL)	2

Repechage round 1
Elena Brugger (GER)	10
Nairomi Sperandio (ITA)	0

Bronze medals
Nikolett Szabó (HUN)	2
Abigail Nette (USA)	13
Elena Brugger (GER)	1
Odunayo Adekuoroye (NGR)	5

==== Women's freestyle 62 kg ====
23 June

Pos	Athlete	Pld	W	L	CP	TP	UKR	BRA	GER	SWE
1	Iryna Koliadenko (UKR)	3	3	0	12	35	—	15–4	10–0	10–0
2	Laís Nunes (BRA)	3	2	1	7	12	1–4 VSU1	—	2–1	6–3
3	Luisa Niemesch (GER)	3	1	2	4	5	0–4 VSU	1–3 VPO1	—	4–2
4	Johanna Lindborg (SWE)	3	0	3	2	5	0–4 VSU	1–3 VPO1	1–3 VPO1	—

Source: UWW

Pos	Athlete	Pld	W	L	CP	TP	UKR	CAN	POL
1	Ilona Prokopevniuk (UKR)	2	2	0	8	6	—	6–4	WO
2	Ana Godinez (CAN)	2	1	1	6	4	1–3 VPO1	—	WO
3	Natalia Kubaty (POL)	2	0	2	0	0	0–5 VIN	0–5 VIN	—

Source: UWW

Semifinals
Iryna Koliadenko (UKR)	7
Ana Godinez (CAN)	6
Ilona Prokopevniuk (UKR)	6^{F}
Laís Nunes (BRA)	0

Final
Iryna Koliadenko (UKR)	6
Ilona Prokopevniuk (UKR)	0
Bronze medal
Ana Godinez (CAN)	6
Laís Nunes (BRA)	8

==== Women's freestyle 65 kg ====
24 June

Pos	Athlete	Pld	W	L	CP	TP	UKR	USA	ROU	UKR	ITA
1	Tetiana Rizhko (UKR)	4	4	0	17	31	—	5–0 Fall	6–1	10–1 Fall	10–0
2	Emma Bruntil (USA)	4	3	1	11	23	0–5 VFA	—	2–0	11–8	10–0 Fall
3	Kriszta Incze (ROU)	4	2	2	9	17	1–3 VPO1	0–3 VPO	—	4–1	12–0 Fall
4	Kateryna Zelenykh (UKR)	4	1	3	6	20	0–5 VFA	1–3 VPO1	1–3 VPO1	—	10–0
5	Veronica Braschi (ITA)	4	0	4	0	0	0–4 VSU	0–5 VFA	0–5 VFA	0–4 VSU	—

Source: UWW

==== Women's freestyle 68 kg ====
Legend

- F — Won by fall

Quarterfinals		Semifinals		Final
Natalia Strzałka (POL)	2
Wiktoria Chołuj (POL)	5	Wiktoria Chołuj (POL)	2
Noémi Szabados (HUN)	0	Alla Belinska (UKR)	5^{F}
Alla Belinska (UKR)	10			Alla Belinska (UKR)	2^{F}
Gabriela Rocha (BRA)	1			Irina Rîngaci (MDA)	0
Irina Rîngaci (MDA)	12	Irina Rîngaci (MDA)	2^{F}
Blessing Oborududu (NGR)	15	Blessing Oborududu (NGR)	0
Adéla Hanzlíčková (CZE)	3

Bronze medals
Noémi Szabados (HUN)	2
Wiktoria Chołuj (POL)	4
Gabriela Rocha (BRA)	0
Blessing Oborududu (NGR)	11

==== Women's freestyle 72 kg ====
24 June

Pos	Athlete	Pld	W	L	CP	TP	USA	GER	ROU	USA	TUR
1	Skylar Grote (USA)	4	4	0	14	33	—	6–2	6–3	11–0	10–0
2	Anna Schell (GER)	4	3	1	13	27	1–3 VPO1	—	13–4	2–2 Fall	10–0
3	Alexandra Anghel (ROU)	4	2	2	11	23	1–3 VPO1	1–3 VPO1	—	12–1	4–0 Fall
4	Marilyn Garcia (USA)	4	1	3	4	8	0–4 VSU	0–5 VFA	1–4 VSU1	—	5–0
5	Ayşegül Özbege (TUR)	4	0	4	0	0	0–4 VSU	0–4 VSU	0–5 VFA	0–3 VPO	—

Source: UWW

==== Women's freestyle 76 kg ====
23 June

Pos	Athlete	Pld	W	L	CP	TP	USA	AUT	EST	GER
1	Yelena Makoyed (USA)	3	3	0	11	24	—	10–2	8–7	6–0 Fall
2	Martina Kuenz (AUT)	3	2	1	9	11	1–3 VPO1	—	3–2	6–0 Fall
3	Epp Mäe (EST)	3	1	2	5	16	1–3 VPO1	1–3 VPO1	—	7–2
4	Francy Rädelt (GER)	3	0	3	1	2	0–5 VFA	0–5 VFA	1–3 VPO1	—

Source: UWW

Pos	Athlete	Pld	W	L	CP	TP	UKR	ROU	TUR
1	Anastasiya Alpyeyeva (UKR)	2	2	0	8	11	—	8–4	3–0 Fall
2	Cătălina Axente (ROU)	2	1	1	4	9	1–3 VPO1	—	5–0
3	Mehtap Gültekin (TUR)	2	0	2	0	0	0–5 VFA	0–3 VPO	—

Source: UWW

Semifinals
Yelena Makoyed (USA)	10^{F}
Cătălina Axente (ROU)	0
Anastasiya Alpyeyeva (UKR)	2
Martina Kuenz (AUT)	0

Final
Yelena Makoyed (USA)	10
Anastasiya Alpyeyeva (UKR)	0
Bronze medal
Cătălina Axente (ROU)	2
Martina Kuenz (AUT)	5

== Ranking Series ==
Ranking Series Calendar 2022:

- 1st Ranking Series: 24–27 February, Turkey, Istanbul ⇒ 2022 Yasar Dogu Tournament
  2022 Vehbi Emre & Hamit Kaplan Tournament
- 2nd Ranking Series: 2–5 June, Kazakhstan, Almaty ⇒ 2022 Bolat Turlykhanov Cup
- 3rd Ranking Series: 22–25 June, Italy, Rome ⇒ Matteo Pellicone Ranking Series 2022
- 4th Ranking Series: 14–17 July, Tunisia, Tunis ⇒ 2022 Tunis Ranking Series
