= Selçuk Can =

Turkish Greco-Roman wrestler

Personal information
- Born: 10 August 1995 (age 30) Şanlıurfa, Turkey

Sport
- Country: Turkey
- Sport: Amateur wrestling
- Weight class: 72 kg
- Event: Greco-Roman
- Club: Ankara Aski Sport Club
Medal record
Men's Greco-Roman wrestling
Representing Turkey
World Championships
Bronze medal – third place	2022 Belgrade	72 kg
Bronze medal – third place	2023 Belgrade	72 kg
European Championships
Gold medal – first place	2024 Bucharest	72 kg
Bronze medal – third place	2020 Rome	72 kg
Bronze medal – third place	2023 Zagreb	72 kg
World Military Championships
Gold medal – first place	2024 Yerevan	72 kg
Vehbi Emre & Hamit Kaplan Tournament
Gold medal – first place	2022 Istanbul	72 kg
Bronze medal – third place	2019 Istanbul	72 kg
Dan Kolov & Nikola Petrov Tournament
Bronze medal – third place	2026 Plovdiv	72 kg
Grand Prix
Gold medal – first place	2021 Nice	72 kg
Gold medal – first place	2023 Zagreb	72 kg
Silver medal – second place	2020 Rome	72 kg
Silver medal – second place	2021 Rome	72 kg
Bronze medal – third place	2019 Gyoer	72 kg
Bronze medal – third place	2020 Zagreb	72 kg
Bronze medal – third place	2022 Rome	72 kg

Selçuk Can (born 10 August 1995) is a Turkish Greco-Roman wrestler. He won the gold medal at the 2024 European Wrestling Championships.

== Career ==
He won one of the bronze medals in the 72 kg event at the 2020 European Wrestling Championships held in Rome, Italy. In 2021, he won the silver medal in the 72 kg event at the Matteo Pellicone Ranking Series 2021 held in Rome, Italy. He won the gold medal in his event at the 2022 Vehbi Emre & Hamit Kaplan Tournament held in Istanbul, Turkey.

In 2023, he won one of the bronze medals in the men's 72 kg event at the 2023 European Wrestling Championships held in Zagreb, Croatia. Starting from the qualifying round, Selçuk Can defeated Hungarian Róbert Fritsch 7-1 to reach the quarterfinals. In the quarterfinals, he defeated German Michael Widmayer 6-0 and progressed to the semifinals. In the semifinals, he defeated his Azerbaijani opponent Ulvu Ganizade 2-1 and reached the bronze medal match. In the bronze medal match, Can defeated Ukrainian Andrii Kulyk 5-1 and won the bronze medal.

He competed at the 2024 European Wrestling Olympic Qualification Tournament in Baku, Azerbaijan hoping to qualify for the 2024 Summer Olympics in Paris, France. He was eliminated in his third match and he did not qualify for the Olympics. He also competed at the 2024 World Wrestling Olympic Qualification Tournament held in Istanbul, Turkey without qualifying for the Olympics.

== Achievements ==
Year	Tournament	Location	Result	Event
2024	European Championships	Bucharest, Romania	1st	Greco-Roman 72 kg
2023	World Championships	Belgrade, Serbia	3rd	Greco-Roman 72 kg
2023	European Championships	Zagreb, Croatia	3rd	Greco-Roman 72 kg
2022	World Championships	Belgrade, Serbia	3rd	Greco-Roman 72 kg
2020	European Championships	Rome, Italy	3rd	Greco-Roman 72 kg
