= Ulvu Ganizade =

Azerbaijani Greco-Roman wrestler

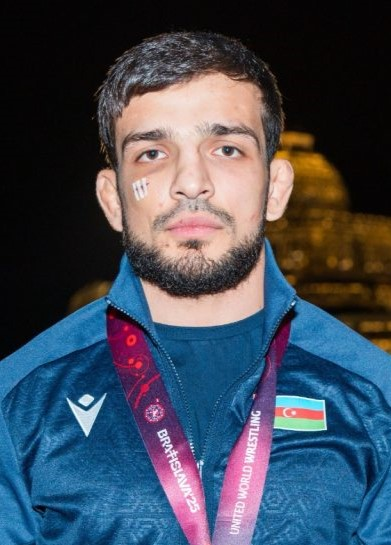
- Ulvu Ganizade in 2025

Personal information
- Born: 1 January 1999 (age 27) Sumgait, Azerbaijan

Sport
- Country: Azerbaijan
- Sport: Amateur wrestling
- Weight class: 72 kg
- Event: Greco-Roman
Medal record
Men's Greco-Roman wrestling
Representing Azerbaijan
World Championships
Gold medal – first place	2024 Tirana	72 kg
Gold medal – first place	2025 Zagreb	72 kg
Silver medal – second place	2022 Belgrade	72 kg
European Championships
Gold medal – first place	2023 Zagreb	72 kg
Silver medal – second place	2024 Bucharest	72 kg
Bronze medal – third place	2020 Rome	72 kg
Bronze medal – third place	2022 Budapest	72 kg
Bronze medal – third place	2025 Bratislava	72 kg
Islamic Solidarity Games
Silver medal – second place	2021 Konya	72 kg
World Military Championships
Gold medal – first place	2023 Baku	72 kg
Grand Prix
Silver medal – second place	2022 Rome	72 kg
World U23 Championships
Bronze medal – third place	2021 Belgrade	72 kg

Ulvu Ganizade is an Azerbaijani Greco-Roman wrestler. He won the silver medal in the 72 kg event at the 2022 World Wrestling Championships held in Belgrade, Serbia. He is also a five-time medalist, including gold, at the European Wrestling Championships.

== Career ==
He won one of the bronze medals in the 72 kg event at the 2020 European Wrestling Championships held in Rome, Italy.

At the 2021 U23 World Wrestling Championships held in Belgrade, Serbia, he won one of the bronze medals in the 72 kg event.

He also won one of the bronze medals in the 72 kg event at the 2022 European Wrestling Championships held in Budapest, Hungary. He won the silver medal in his event at the 2021 Islamic Solidarity Games held in Konya, Turkey.

In April 2023, he won gold medal at the 2023 European Wrestling Championships held in Zagreb, Croatia. He won the silver medal in the 72 kg event at the 2024 European Wrestling Championships held in Bucharest, Romania.

As of April 1, 2026, with a score of 400 points, holds fourth place in the ranking of Azerbaijani athletes according to the Ministry of Youth and Sports.

== Achievements ==
Year	Tournament	Location	Result	Event
2020	European Championships	Rome, Italy	3rd	Greco-Roman 72 kg
2022	European Championships	Budapest, Hungary	3rd	Greco-Roman 72 kg
2022	Islamic Solidarity Games	Konya, Turkey	2nd	Greco-Roman 72 kg
2022	World Championships	Belgrade, Serbia	2nd	Greco-Roman 72 kg
2023	European Championships	Zagreb, Croatia	1st	Greco-Roman 72 kg
2024	European Championships	Bucharest, Romania	2nd	Greco-Roman 72 kg
2024	World Championships	Tirana, Albania	1st	Greco-Roman 72 kg
2025	European Championships	Bratislava, Slovakia	3rd	Greco-Roman 72 kg
2025	World Championships	Zagreb, Croatia	1st	Greco-Roman 72 kg
