= 2020 European Wrestling Championships =

2020 European Championship
- Host city: Rome, Italy
- Dates: 10–16 February
- Stadium: PalaPellicone

Champions
- Freestyle: Russia
- Greco-Roman: Russia
- Women: Russia

The 2020 European Wrestling Championships was held in Rome, Italy between 10 and 16 February 2020.

== Medal table ==
* Host nation (Italy)

Rank	Nation	Gold	Silver	Bronze	Total
1	Russia	9	6	7	22
2	Bulgaria	3	2	1	6
3	Belarus	3	1	4	8
4	Ukraine	2	3	8	13
5	Azerbaijan	2	2	9	13
6	Armenia	2	0	3	5
7	Norway	2	0	1	3
8	Turkey	1	3	5	9
9	Georgia	1	3	4	8
10	Italy*	1	2	1	4
11	Germany	1	1	5	7
12	Romania	1	1	2	4
13	Poland	1	1	0	2
14	Moldova	1	0	1	2
15	Hungary	0	2	1	3
16	Netherlands	0	1	0	1
16	San Marino	0	1	0	1
16	Switzerland	0	1	0	1
19	Sweden	0	0	4	4
20	Lithuania	0	0	2	2
21	Serbia	0	0	1	1
21	Slovakia	0	0	1	1
Totals (22 entries)		30	30	60	120

== Team ranking ==
Rank	Men's freestyle		Men's Greco-Roman		Women's freestyle	
Rank	Team	Points	Team	Points	Team	Points
1	Russia	186	Russia	128	Russia	190
2	Azerbaijan	116	Azerbaijan	116	Ukraine	155
3	Georgia	95	Turkey	90	Belarus	97
4	Turkey	95	Armenia	84	Bulgaria	89
5	Belarus	85	Georgia	82	Turkey	87
6	Poland	65	Ukraine	81	Germany	86
7	Armenia	65	Hungary	79	Azerbaijan	65
8	Ukraine	64	Bulgaria	75	Moldova	55
9	Romania	53	Belarus	59	Romania	51
10	Bulgaria	50	Germany	55	Italy	46

== Medal summary ==
=== Men's freestyle ===
Event	Gold	Silver	Bronze
57 kg	Azamat Tuskaev; Russia	Süleyman Atlı; Turkey	Horst Lehr; Germany
57 kg	Azamat Tuskaev; Russia	Süleyman Atlı; Turkey	Stevan Mićić; Serbia
61 kg	Aleksandr Bogomoev; Russia	Beka Lomtadze; Georgia	Nikolai Okhlopkov; Romania
61 kg	Aleksandr Bogomoev; Russia	Beka Lomtadze; Georgia	Arsen Harutyunyan; Armenia
65 kg	Kurban Shiraev; Russia	Niurgun Skriabin; Belarus	Ali Rahimzade; Azerbaijan
65 kg	Kurban Shiraev; Russia	Niurgun Skriabin; Belarus	Erik Arushanian; Ukraine
70 kg	Magomedmurad Gadzhiev; Poland	Ağahüseyn Mustafayev; Azerbaijan	Haydar Yavuz; Turkey
70 kg	Magomedmurad Gadzhiev; Poland	Ağahüseyn Mustafayev; Azerbaijan	Mihail Sava; Moldova
74 kg	Frank Chamizo; Italy	Magomedrasul Gazimagomedov; Russia	Avtandil Kentchadze; Georgia
74 kg	Frank Chamizo; Italy	Magomedrasul Gazimagomedov; Russia	Soner Demirtaş; Turkey
79 kg	Mahamedkhabib Kadzimahamedau; Belarus	Magomed Ramazanov; Russia	Vasyl Mykhailov; Ukraine
79 kg	Mahamedkhabib Kadzimahamedau; Belarus	Magomed Ramazanov; Russia	Jabrayil Hasanov; Azerbaijan
86 kg	Artur Naifonov; Russia	Myles Amine; San Marino	Rasul Tsikhayeu; Belarus
86 kg	Artur Naifonov; Russia	Myles Amine; San Marino	Boris Makoev; Slovakia
92 kg	Süleyman Karadeniz; Turkey	Samuel Scherrer; Switzerland	Amarhajy Mahamedau; Belarus
92 kg	Süleyman Karadeniz; Turkey	Samuel Scherrer; Switzerland	Aslanbek Alborov; Azerbaijan
97 kg	Abdulrashid Sadulaev; Russia	Albert Saritov; Romania	Abraham Conyedo; Italy
97 kg	Abdulrashid Sadulaev; Russia	Albert Saritov; Romania	Elizbar Odikadze; Georgia
125 kg	Geno Petriashvili; Georgia	Robert Baran; Poland	Baldan Tsyzhipov; Russia
125 kg	Geno Petriashvili; Georgia	Robert Baran; Poland	Jamaladdin Magomedov; Azerbaijan

=== Men's Greco-Roman ===
Event	Gold	Silver	Bronze
55 kg	Edmond Nazaryan; Bulgaria	Vitalii Kabaloev; Russia	Eldaniz Azizli; Azerbaijan
55 kg	Edmond Nazaryan; Bulgaria	Vitalii Kabaloev; Russia	Nugzari Tsurtsumia; Georgia
60 kg	Gevorg Gharibyan; Armenia	Kerem Kamal; Turkey	Murad Bazarov; Azerbaijan
60 kg	Gevorg Gharibyan; Armenia	Kerem Kamal; Turkey	Amiran Shavadze; Georgia
63 kg	Maksim Nehoda; Belarus	Ibragim Labazanov; Russia	Erik Torba; Hungary
63 kg	Maksim Nehoda; Belarus	Ibragim Labazanov; Russia	Lenur Temirov; Ukraine
67 kg	Morten Thoresen; Norway	Nazir Abdullaev; Russia	Kristupas Šleiva; Lithuania
67 kg	Morten Thoresen; Norway	Nazir Abdullaev; Russia	Karen Aslanyan; Armenia
72 kg	Frank Stäbler; Germany	Iuri Lomadze; Georgia	Ulvu Ganizade; Azerbaijan
72 kg	Frank Stäbler; Germany	Iuri Lomadze; Georgia	Selçuk Can; Turkey
77 kg	Sanan Suleymanov; Azerbaijan	Zoltán Lévai; Hungary	Alex Kessidis; Sweden
77 kg	Sanan Suleymanov; Azerbaijan	Zoltán Lévai; Hungary	Karapet Chalyan; Armenia
82 kg	Rafig Huseynov; Azerbaijan	Daniel Aleksandrov; Bulgaria	Bogdan Kourinnoi; Sweden
82 kg	Rafig Huseynov; Azerbaijan	Daniel Aleksandrov; Bulgaria	Hannes Wagner; Germany
87 kg	Semen Novikov; Ukraine	Viktor Lőrincz; Hungary	Aleksandr Komarov; Russia
87 kg	Semen Novikov; Ukraine	Viktor Lőrincz; Hungary	Islam Abbasov; Azerbaijan
97 kg	Artur Aleksanyan; Armenia	Nikoloz Kakhelashvili; Italy	Cenk İldem; Turkey
97 kg	Artur Aleksanyan; Armenia	Nikoloz Kakhelashvili; Italy	Aleksandr Golovin; Russia
130 kg	Alin Alexuc-Ciurariu; Romania	Levan Arabuli; Georgia	Mykola Kuchmii; Ukraine
130 kg	Alin Alexuc-Ciurariu; Romania	Levan Arabuli; Georgia	Jello Krahmer; Germany

=== Women's freestyle ===
Event	Gold	Silver	Bronze
50 kg	Miglena Selishka; Bulgaria	Oksana Livach; Ukraine	Kseniya Stankevich; Belarus
50 kg	Miglena Selishka; Bulgaria	Oksana Livach; Ukraine	Milana Dadasheva; Russia
53 kg	Vanesa Kaladzinskaya; Belarus	Jessica Blaszka; Netherlands	Annika Wendle; Germany
53 kg	Vanesa Kaladzinskaya; Belarus	Jessica Blaszka; Netherlands	Stalvira Orshush; Russia
55 kg	Olga Khoroshavtseva; Russia	Solomiia Vynnyk; Ukraine	Bediha Gün; Turkey
55 kg	Olga Khoroshavtseva; Russia	Solomiia Vynnyk; Ukraine	Sofia Mattsson; Sweden
57 kg	Grace Bullen; Norway	Alina Akobiia; Ukraine	Johanna Lindborg; Sweden
57 kg	Grace Bullen; Norway	Alina Akobiia; Ukraine	Iryna Kurachkina; Belarus
59 kg	Anastasia Nichita; Moldova	Bilyana Dudova; Bulgaria	Lyubov Ovcharova; Russia
59 kg	Anastasia Nichita; Moldova	Bilyana Dudova; Bulgaria	Anhelina Lysak; Ukraine
62 kg	Yuliya Tkach; Ukraine	Inna Trazhukova; Russia	Taybe Yusein; Bulgaria
62 kg	Yuliya Tkach; Ukraine	Inna Trazhukova; Russia	Tetiana Omelchenko; Azerbaijan
65 kg	Mimi Hristova; Bulgaria	Elis Manolova; Azerbaijan	Iryna Koliadenko; Ukraine
65 kg	Mimi Hristova; Bulgaria	Elis Manolova; Azerbaijan	Maria Kuznetsova; Russia
68 kg	Khanum Velieva; Russia	Dalma Caneva; Italy	Danutė Domikaitytė; Lithuania
68 kg	Khanum Velieva; Russia	Dalma Caneva; Italy	Alla Cherkasova; Ukraine
72 kg	Natalia Vorobieva; Russia	Maria Selmaier; Germany	Cătălina Axente; Romania
72 kg	Natalia Vorobieva; Russia	Maria Selmaier; Germany	Alina Berezhna; Ukraine
76 kg	Ekaterina Bukina; Russia	Yasemin Adar; Turkey	Aline Rotter-Focken; Germany
76 kg	Ekaterina Bukina; Russia	Yasemin Adar; Turkey	Iselin Moen Solheim; Norway

== Participating nations ==
498 competitors from 39 nations participated:

1. Albania (2)
2. Armenia (20)
3. Austria (7)
4. Azerbaijan (28)
5. Bosnia and Herzegovina (2)
6. Belarus (28)
7. Bulgaria (27)
8. Croatia (5)
9. Czech Republic (6)
10. Denmark (1)
11. Spain (11)
12. Estonia (6)
13. Finland (9)
14. France (13)
15. United Kingdom (4)
16. Georgia (20)
17. Germany (20)
18. Greece (15)
19. Hungary (21)
20. Israel (8)
21. Italy (28) (Host)
22. Kosovo (2)
23. Latvia (4)
24. Lithuania (12)
25. Moldova (22)
26. North Macedonia (4)
27. Netherlands (3)
28. Norway (9)
29. Poland (23)
30. Romania (16)
31. Russia (30)
32. Slovenia (1)
33. San Marino (2)
34. Serbia (8)
35. Switzerland (8)
36. Slovakia (5)
37. Sweden (3)
38. Turkey (30)
39. Ukraine (30)
40. UWW - United World Wrestling (1)
