= Iuri Lomadze =

Georgian Greco-Roman wrestler

Sport
- Country: Georgia
- Sport: Amateur wrestling
- Event: Greco-Roman
Medal record
Men's Greco-Roman wrestling
Representing Georgia
World Championships
| Bronze medal – third place | 2026 Astana | 72 kg |
European Championships
| Silver medal – second place | 2020 Rome | 72 kg |
| Bronze medal – third place | 2024 Bucharest | 77 kg |
| Disqualified | 2018 Kaspiysk | 72 kg |

Iuri Lomadze is a Georgian Greco-Roman wrestler. He won the silver medal in the 72 kg event at the 2020 European Wrestling Championships held in Rome, Italy.

== Career ==
In 2018, he won one of the bronze medals in the men's 72 kg event at the European Wrestling Championships held in Kaspiysk, Russia but he was stripped of his medal after testing positive for a banned substance. As a result, Daniel Cataraga of Moldova was awarded the bronze medal.

He competed in the 72 kg event at the 2019 World Wrestling Championships held in Nur-Sultan, Kazakhstan without winning a medal. He won his first match against Amin Kavianinejad but he was eliminated from the competition in his match against Sanan Suleymanov.

He competed in the 77 kg event at the 2022 World Wrestling Championships held in Belgrade, Serbia.

He won one of the bronze medals in the 77 kg event at the 2024 European Wrestling Championships held in Bucharest, Romania. He competed at the 2024 European Wrestling Olympic Qualification Tournament in Baku, Azerbaijan hoping to qualify for the 2024 Summer Olympics in Paris, France. He was eliminated in his first match and he did not qualify for the Olympics.

== Achievements ==
| Year | Tournament | Location | Result | Event |
|---|---|---|---|---|
| 2018 | ~~European Championships~~ | ~~Kaspiysk, Russia~~ | 3rd | ~~Greco-Roman 72 kg~~ |
| 2020 | European Championships | Rome, Italy | 2nd | Greco-Roman 72 kg |
| 2024 | European Championships | Bucharest, Romania | 3rd | Greco-Roman 77 kg |
