= Kristupas Šleiva =

Lithuanian Greco-Roman wrestler

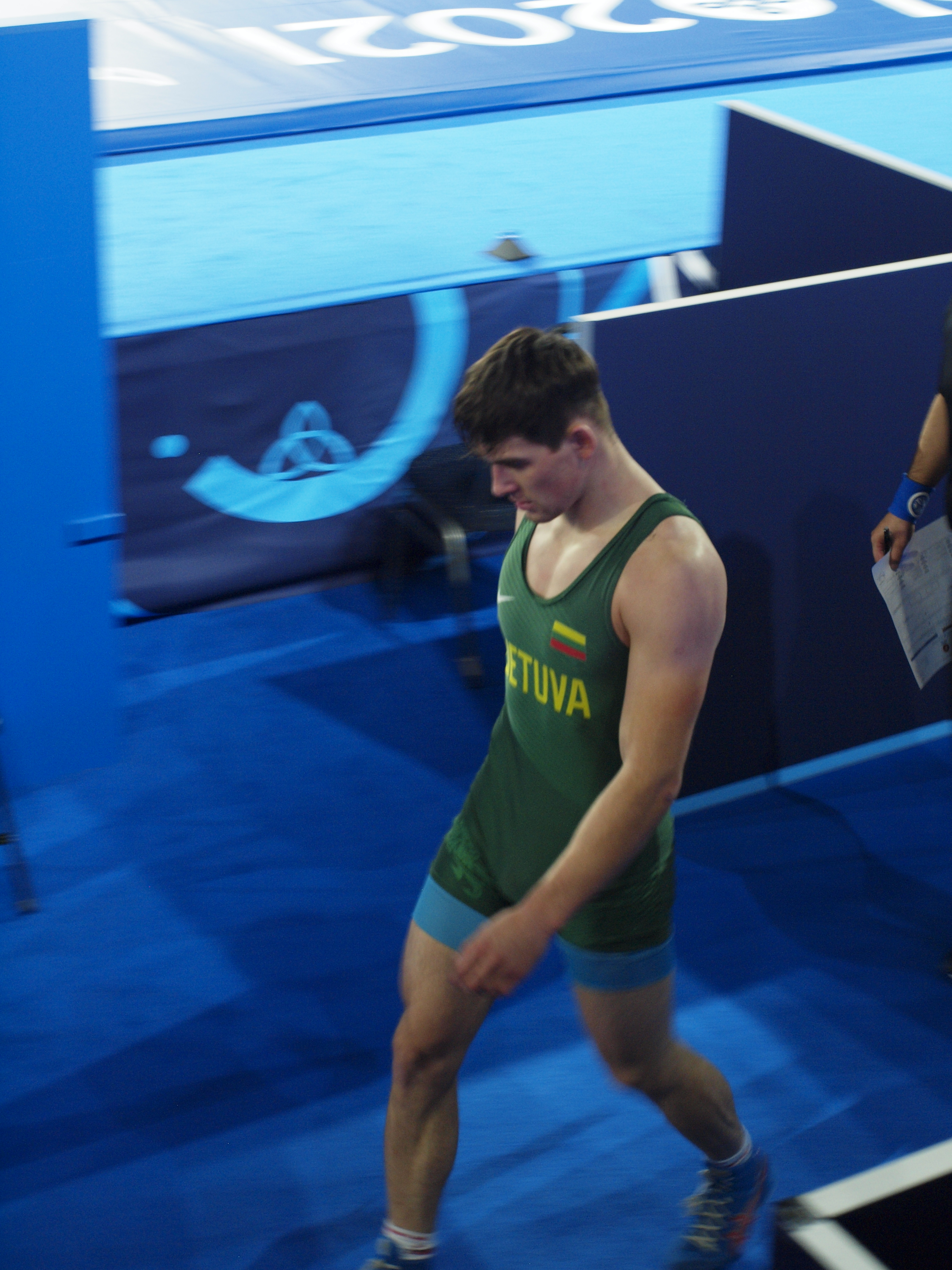
- Kristupas Šleiva at the 2021 World Wrestling Championships in Oslo, Norway

Sport
- Country: Lithuania
- Sport: Amateur wrestling
- Event: Greco-Roman
Medal record
Men's Greco-Roman wrestling
Representing Lithuania
World Championships
Bronze medal – third place	2021 Oslo	72 kg
European Championships
Bronze medal – third place	2020 Rome	67 kg
Grand Prix
Gold medal – first place	2022 Rome	72 kg

Kristupas Šleiva is a Lithuanian Greco-Roman wrestler. He is a bronze medalist at both the World Wrestling Championships and the European Wrestling Championships.

== Career ==
In 2019, he competed in the 67 kg event at the European Wrestling Championships held in Bucharest, Romania.

In 2020, he won one of the bronze medals in the 67 kg event at the European Wrestling Championships held in Rome, Italy.

== Achievements ==
Year	Tournament	Location	Result	Event
2020	European Championships	Rome, Italy	3rd	Greco-Roman 67 kg
2021	World Championships	Oslo, Norway	3rd	Greco-Roman 72 kg
