= Ibrahim Ghanem =

French Greco-Roman wrestler

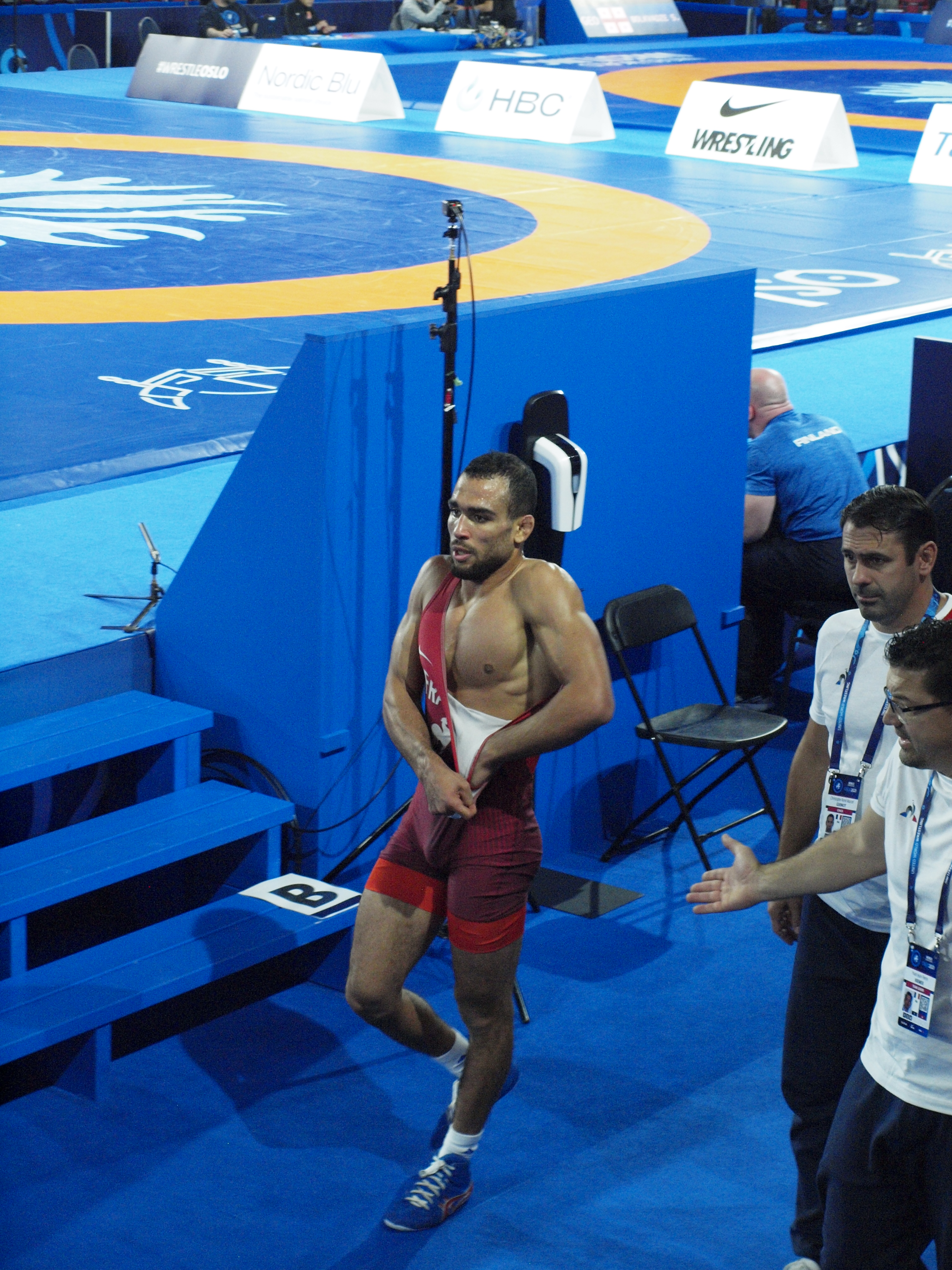

Personal information
- Full name: Mahmoud Ibrahim Hamed Hassan Ghanem
- Born: 17 April 1995 (age 31) Egypt
- Height: 1.75 m (5 ft 9 in)
- Weight: 72 kg (159 lb; 11.3 st)

Sport
- Country: Egypt (2015–2017); France (2020–present)
- Sport: Amateur wrestling
- Weight class: 72 kg
- Event: Greco-Roman
- Club: Cairo Army Sports Club
Medal record
Men's Greco-Roman wrestling
Representing France
World Championships
| Gold medal – first place | 2023 Belgrade | 72 kg |
| Silver medal – second place | 2024 Tirana | 72 kg |
| Silver medal – second place | 2025 Zagreb | 72 kg |
European Championships
| Gold medal – first place | 2025 Bratislava | 72 kg |
| Silver medal – second place | 2023 Zagreb | 72 kg |
Grand Prix
| Gold medal – first place | 2022 Dortmund | 77 kg |
| Gold medal – first place | 2023 Druskininkai | 72 kg |
| Silver medal – second place | 2020 Warsaw | 72 kg |
| Silver medal – second place | 2021 Bucharest | 72 kg |
| Silver medal – second place | 2021 Nice | 72 kg |
| Bronze medal – third place | 2023 Zagreb | 72 kg |
| Bronze medal – third place | 2025 Nice | 72 kg |
Representing Egypt
African Championships
| Gold medal – first place | 2017 Marrakesh | 71 kg |
Military World Games
| Bronze medal – third place | 2015 Mungyeong | 75 kg |
World Juniors Championships
| Bronze medal – third place | 2014 Zagreb | 66 kg |

Ibrahim Ghanem (born 17 April 1995 in Egypt) is an Egyptian wrestler naturalized French, specializing in Greco-Roman wrestling. He was African champion in Marrakech 2017 in the 71 kg. He won the gold medal in the 72 kg event at the 2023 World Wrestling Championships.

== Career ==
He showed off in the Egyptian youth national team by winning a bronze medal at the 2014 World Junior Championships in Zagreb.

He was part of Egypt's expedition to the World Military Games in Mungyeong, where he won the bronze medal in the 75 kg tournament.

He became continental champion at the 2017 African Championships in Marrakech by winning the 71 kg category, overcoming Algerian Akrem Boudjemline in the final.

Since 2020, he has been competing for the French national team, with which he made his debut at the 2020 Rome Europeans, where he was eliminated in the quarterfinals of the 72-kilogram tournament by Russia's Adam Kurak. At the 2020 Belgrade Individual World Cup, a competition that replaced the world championship, which was canceled due to the onset of the health emergency resulting from the COVID-19 pandemic, he was eliminated in the quarterfinals by Turkey's Cengiz Arslan.

At the 2021 Warsaw Europeans he was ousted from the 72 kg category in the round of 16 by Hungarian Róbert Fritsch, later a bronze medal winner. The same year he made his debut at the world championships held in Oslo where he passed the first round against Aleksa Erski of Serbia and was eliminated in the round of 16 by Gevorg Sahakyan of Poland.

At the Budapest 2022 Europeans he was ousted from the main draw of the 77 kg tournament (his new weight category as of this event) in the round of 16 at the hands of Turkey's Yunus Emre Başar; in the repechages he was defeated by Serbia's Antonio Kamenjašević.

On September 23, 2023, he won the gold medal in the 2023 World Wrestling Championships.
