= 2023 Polyák Imre & Varga János Memorial Tournament – Women's freestyle =

The women's freestyle competitions at the 2023 Polyák Imre & Varga János Memorial Tournament was held in Budapest, Hungary between 14 and 15 July 2023.

== Women's freestyle ==
=== Women's freestyle 50 kg ===
14 July

Legend

- F — Won by fall
- WO — Won by walkover

Round of 32
	Score	
Erin Golston (USA)	5–1	Gabija Dilytė (LTU)
Polina Lukina (AIN)	10–0	Kamila Barbosa (BRA)
Evin Demirhan (TUR)	12–2	Nada Medani (EGY)
Feng Ziqi (CHN)	10–0	Bianka Fáth (HUN)
Vestina Danisevičiūtė (LTU)	0–11	Emma Luttenauer (FRA)
Madison Parks (CAN)	5–0	Katie Dutchak (CAN)
Szimonetta Szekér (HUN)	2–8 Fall	Nadezhda Sokolova (AIN)
Dolgorjavyn Otgonjargal (MGL)	0–10	Sarah Hildebrandt (USA)
Agata Walerzak (POL)	11–0	Maria Leorda (MDA)
Alina Vuc (ROU)	2–4	Fan Meng (CHN)

Round of 16
Zhu Jiang (CHN)	10
Erin Golston (USA)	0
Polina Lukina (AIN)	4
Evin Demirhan (TUR)	6
Mercy Genesis (NGR)	0
Feng Ziqi (CHN)	10
Emma Luttenauer (FRA)	0
Jacqueline Mollocana (ECU)	10
Anna Łukasiak (POL)	7
Madison Parks (CAN)	5
Nadezhda Sokolova (AIN)	10
Cheon Mi-ran (KOR)	0
Sarah Hildebrandt (USA)	10^{F}
Agata Walerzak (POL)	0
Fan Meng (CHN)	1
Julie Sabatié (FRA)	3

Quarterfinals
Zhu Jiang (CHN)	5
Evin Demirhan (TUR)	1
Feng Ziqi (CHN)	10
Jacqueline Mollocana (ECU)	0
Anna Łukasiak (POL)	0
Nadezhda Sokolova (AIN)	10
Sarah Hildebrandt (USA)	11
Julie Sabatié (FRA)	0

Semifinals
Zhu Jiang (CHN)	8
Feng Ziqi (CHN)	10
Nadezhda Sokolova (AIN)	1
Sarah Hildebrandt (USA)	8

Finals
Feng Ziqi (CHN)	2
Sarah Hildebrandt (USA)	4

Repechage round 1
Bianka Fáth (HUN)	0
Mercy Genesis (NGR)	10
Dolgorjavyn Otgonjargal (MGL)	12
Agata Walerzak (POL)	6

Repechage round 2
Mercy Genesis (NGR)	7
Jacqueline Mollocana (ECU)	2
Dolgorjavyn Otgonjargal (MGL)	10^{F}
Julie Sabatié (FRA)	1

Bronze medal match
Mercy Genesis (NGR)	WO
Zhu Jiang (CHN)
Dolgorjavyn Otgonjargal (MGL)	16
Nadezhda Sokolova (AIN)	5

=== Women's freestyle 53 kg ===
14 July

Legend

- F — Won by fall
- R — Retired
- WO — Won by walkover

Round of 32
	Score	
Tatiana Debien (FRA)	1–5	Roksana Zasina (POL)
Vivien Matyi (HUN)	0–8 Fall	Lucía Yépez (ECU)
Samantha Stewart (CAN)	0–4	Andreea Ana (ROU)
Thalía Mallqui (PER)	0–10	Dominique Parrish (USA)
Iulia Leorda (MDA)	2–12	Annika Wendle (GER)
Jonna Malmgren (SWE)	11–1	Tuba Demir (TUR)

Round of 16
Pang Qianyu (CHN)	8
Tetiana Profatilova (FRA)	3
Roksana Zasina (POL)	6
Anastasia Blayvas (GER)	3
Katarzyna Krawczyk (POL)	1
Lucía Yépez (ECU)	8
Andreea Ana (ROU)	4
Zhang Min (CHN)	11
Jiang Meiying (CHN)	4
Dominique Parrish (USA)	11
Annika Wendle (GER)	11
Oh Hyun-young (KOR)	0
Bat-Ochiryn Bolortuyaa (MGL)	10
Jonna Malmgren (SWE)	0
Stalvira Orshush (HUN)	2^{R}
Diana Weicker (CAN)	3

Quarterfinals
Pang Qianyu (CHN)	3
Roksana Zasina (POL)	2
Lucía Yépez (ECU)	9
Zhang Min (CHN)	5
Dominique Parrish (USA)	5
Annika Wendle (GER)	1
Bat-Ochiryn Bolortuyaa (MGL)	10
Diana Weicker (CAN)	0

Semifinals
Pang Qianyu (CHN)	1
Lucía Yépez (ECU)	3
Dominique Parrish (USA)	2
Bat-Ochiryn Bolortuyaa (MGL)	13

Final
Lucía Yépez (ECU)
Bat-Ochiryn Bolortuyaa (MGL)	WO

Repechage round 1
Vivien Matyi (HUN)	0
Katarzyna Krawczyk (POL)	10

Repechage round 2
Katarzyna Krawczyk (POL)	0
Zhang Min (CHN)	11
Jonna Malmgren (SWE)
Diana Weicker (CAN)	WO

Bronze medal match
Zhang Min (CHN)	0
Pang Qianyu (CHN)	10
Diana Weicker (CAN)	10
Dominique Parrish (USA)	0

=== Women's freestyle 55 kg ===
15 July

Legend

- F — Won by fall
- WO — Won by walkover

Round of 16
Areana Villaescusa (USA)	WO
Vinesh Phogat (IND)
Laura Stanelytė (LTU)	0
Mariana Drăguțan (MDA)	10
Erika Bognár (HUN)	3
Alisha Howk (USA)	2

Quarterfinals
Deng Li (CHN)	7
Areana Villaescusa (USA)	3
Marina Sedneva (KAZ)
Karla Godinez (CAN)	WO
Róza Szenttamási (HUN)	1
Mariana Drăguțan (MDA)	10
Erika Bognár (HUN)	0
Jacarra Winchester (USA)	11

Semifinals
Deng Li (CHN)	2
Karla Godinez (CAN)	2
Mariana Drăguțan (MDA)	0
Jacarra Winchester (USA)	11

Final
Karla Godinez (CAN)	2
Jacarra Winchester (USA)	7

Bronze medal match
Marina Sedneva (KAZ)
Deng Li (CHN)	WO
Erika Bognár (HUN)	8^{F}
Mariana Drăguțan (MDA)	1

=== Women's freestyle 57 kg ===
14 July

Legend

- F — Won by fall
- R — Retired

Round of 32
	Score	
Hong Kexin (CHN)	4–1 Fall	Elvira Kamaloğlu (TUR)
Amanda Martinez (USA)	8–5	Elena Brugger (GER)
Anhelina Lysak (POL)	0–10	Giullia Penalber (BRA)
Zhang Qi (CHN)	5–0	Zhuomalaga (CHN)
Luisa Valverde (ECU)	4–0 Fall	Nova Bergman (SWE)
Gerda Terék (HUN)	0–5 Ret	Anna Szél (HUN)
Sandra Paruszewski (GER)	5–3	Patrycja Gil (POL)
Mathilde Rivière (FRA)	0–8	Jowita Wrzesień (POL)
Olga Khoroshavtseva (AIN)	15–5	Alexandria Town (CAN)
Erkhembayaryn Davaachimeg (MGL)	7–3	Evelina Hulthén (SWE)
Xochitl Mota-Pettis (USA)	10–0	Ramóna Galambos (HUN)
Alexandra Hedrick (USA)	4–2	Betzabeth Sarco (VEN)

Round of 16
Anna Michalcová (CZE)	0
Hong Kexin (CHN)	10
Amanda Martinez (USA)	3
Giullia Penalber (BRA)	7^{F}
Zhang Qi (CHN)	3
Luisa Valverde (ECU)	2
Gerda Terék (HUN)	1
Bark Jeong-ae (KOR)	3^{F}
Anastasia Nichita (MDA)	7
Sandra Paruszewski (GER)	0
Jowita Wrzesień (POL)	2
Olga Khoroshavtseva (AIN)	5
Erkhembayaryn Davaachimeg (MGL)	6^{F}
Xochitl Mota-Pettis (USA)	0
Alexandra Hedrick (USA)	3
Hannah Taylor (CAN)	4

Quarterfinals
Hong Kexin (CHN)	10
Giullia Penalber (BRA)	0
Zhang Qi (CHN)	10
Bark Jeong-ae (KOR)	0
Anastasia Nichita (MDA)	8^{F}
Olga Khoroshavtseva (AIN)	0
Erkhembayaryn Davaachimeg (MGL)	4
Hannah Taylor (CAN)	5

Semifinals
Hong Kexin (CHN)	4
Zhang Qi (CHN)	0
Anastasia Nichita (MDA)	9^{F}
Hannah Taylor (CAN)	2

Final
Hong Kexin (CHN)	2
Anastasia Nichita (MDA)	8

Repechage round 1
Elvira Kamaloğlu (TUR)	10
Anna Michalcová (CZE)	0

Repechage round 2
Elvira Kamaloğlu (TUR)	4
Giullia Penalber (BRA)	5^{F}
Sandra Paruszewski (GER)	3
Olga Khoroshavtseva (AIN)	2

Bronze medal match
Giullia Penalber (BRA)	0
Zhang Qi (CHN)	11
Sandra Paruszewski (GER)	2
Hannah Taylor (CAN)	11

=== Women's freestyle 59 kg ===
15 July

Legend

- F — Won by fall

Pos	Athlete	Pld	W	L	CP	TP	POL	HUN	HUN
1	Magdalena Głodek (POL)	2	2	0	6	16	—	8–3	8–3
2	Viktória Borsos (HUN)	2	1	1	4	6	1–3 VPO1	—	3–2
3	Nikolett Szabó (HUN)	2	0	2	2	5	1–3 VPO1	1–3 VPO1	—

Source: UWW

Pos	Athlete	Pld	W	L	CP	TP	USA	IND	USA
1	Jennifer Rogers (USA)	2	2	0	9	21	—	10–0 Fall	11–0
2	Sangeeta Phogat (IND)	2	1	1	4	12	0–5 VFA	—	12–2
3	Brenda Reyna (USA)	2	0	2	1	2	0–4 VSU	1–4 VSU1	—

Source: UWW

Semifinals
Magdalena Głodek (POL)	6
Sangeeta Phogat (IND)	4
Jennifer Rogers (USA)	11
Viktória Borsos (HUN)	0

Final
Magdalena Głodek (POL)	11
Jennifer Rogers (USA)	13
Bronze medal
Sangeeta Phogat (IND)	6
Viktória Borsos (HUN)	2

=== Women's freestyle 62 kg ===
14 July

Legend

- F — Won by fall
- WO — Won by walkover

Round of 32
	Score	
Selvi İlyasoğlu (TUR)	2–7	Kayla Miracle (USA)
Irina Kuznetsova (KAZ)	2–3	Natalia Kubaty (POL)
Améline Douarre (FRA)	0–8	Enikő Elekes (HUN)
Kriszta Incze (ROU)	WO	~~Angelina Lelo (ANG)~~
Laís Nunes (BRA)	5–3	Ana Godinez (CAN)
Aisuluu Tynybekova (KGZ)	2–0	Luisa Niemesch (GER)
Bridgette Duty (USA)	0–5 Fall	Alina Kasabieva (AIN)

Round of 16
Roxana Capezan (ROU)	0
Bilyana Dudova (BUL)	10
Kayla Miracle (USA)	0
Viktoria Vesso (EST)	4^{F}
Luo Xiaojuan (CHN)	8
Natalia Kubaty (POL)	6
Enikő Elekes (HUN)	6
Esther Kolawole (NGR)	1
Lydia Pérez (ESP)	0
Kriszta Incze (ROU)	8
Laís Nunes (BRA)	6
Aleksandra Wólczyńska (POL)	0
Yasmine Soliman (HUN)	0
Aisuluu Tynybekova (KGZ)	10
Alina Kasabieva (AIN)	10
Lee Han-bit (KOR)	0

Quarterfinals
Bilyana Dudova (BUL)	9
Viktoria Vesso (EST)	0
Luo Xiaojuan (CHN)	6^{F}
Enikő Elekes (HUN)	5
Kriszta Incze (ROU)	0
Laís Nunes (BRA)	8
Aisuluu Tynybekova (KGZ)	6^{F}
Alina Kasabieva (AIN)	1

Semifinals
Bilyana Dudova (BUL)	2
Luo Xiaojuan (CHN)	0
Laís Nunes (BRA)	2
Aisuluu Tynybekova (KGZ)	5

Final
Bilyana Dudova (BUL)	1
Aisuluu Tynybekova (KGZ)	2

Repechage round 1
Luisa Niemesch (GER)	10
Yasmine Soliman (HUN)	0

Repechage round 2
Roxana Capezan (ROU)
Viktoria Vesso (EST)	WO
Luisa Niemesch (GER)	1
Alina Kasabieva (AIN)	2

Bronze medal match
Viktoria Vesso (EST)	1
Luo Xiaojuan (CHN)	9^{F}
Alina Kasabieva (AIN)	7
Laís Nunes (BRA)	0

=== Women's freestyle 65 kg ===
15 July

Legend

- F — Won by fall

Pos	Athlete	Pld	W	L	CP	TP	MDA	TUR	AIN	GER
1	Irina Rîngaci (MDA)	3	3	0	13	24	—	10–0	10–0	4–0 Fall
2	Kadriye Aksoy (TUR)	3	1	2	5	17	0–4 VSU	—	6–7	11–0
3	Ekaterina Koshkina (AIN)	3	1	2	4	11	0–4 VSU	3–1 VPO1	—	4–5
4	Anne Nürnberger (GER)	3	1	2	3	5	0–5 VFA	0–4 VSU	3–1 VPO1	—

Source: UWW

=== Women's freestyle 68 kg ===
14 July

Legend

- F — Won by fall

Round of 32
	Score	
Alexandria Glaudé (USA)	4–0	Nesrin Baş (TUR)
Kendra Dacher (FRA)	7–6	Pauline Lecarpentier (FRA)
Tindra Sjöberg (SWE)	0–10	Zhou Feng (CHN)
Natalia Strzałka (POL)	4–10	Olivia Di Bacco (CAN)
Wiktoria Chołuj (POL)	12–1	Eyleen Sewina (GER)
Buse Tosun Çavuşoğlu (TUR)	4–5	Forrest Molinari (USA)
Noémi Szabados (HUN)	0–7	Koumba Larroque (FRA)

Round of 16
Zhou Xinru (CHN)	8
Enkhsaikhany Delgermaa (MGL)	8
Alexandria Glaudé (USA)	8
Park Hyeon-yeong (KOR)	5
Alexandra Anghel (ROU)	3
Kendra Dacher (FRA)	1
Zhou Feng (CHN)	3^{F}
Yanet Sovero (PER)	0
Yelena Shalygina (KAZ)	4
Olivia Di Bacco (CAN)	2^{F}
Wiktoria Chołuj (POL)	0
Blessing Oborududu (NGR)	3
Adéla Hanzlíčková (CZE)	0
Forrest Molinari (USA)	6
Koumba Larroque (FRA)	7
Tayla Ford (NZL)	0

Quarterfinals
Zhou Xinru (CHN)	14
Alexandria Glaudé (USA)	1
Alexandra Anghel (ROU)	0
Zhou Feng (CHN)	7^{F}
Olivia Di Bacco (CAN)	2
Blessing Oborududu (NGR)	3^{F}
Forrest Molinari (USA)	6
Koumba Larroque (FRA)	1

Semifinals
Zhou Xinru (CHN)	0
Zhou Feng (CHN)	10
Blessing Oborududu (NGR)	7
Forrest Molinari (USA)	4

Final
Zhou Feng (CHN)	2
Blessing Oborududu (NGR)	1

Repechage round 1
Tindra Sjöberg (SWE)	5
Yanet Sovero (PER)	1

Repechage round 2
Tindra Sjöberg (SWE)	0
Alexandra Anghel (ROU)	11
Wiktoria Chołuj (POL)	1
Olivia Di Bacco (CAN)	8

Bronze medal match
Alexandra Anghel (ROU)	6^{F}
Zhou Xinru (CHN)	4
Olivia Di Bacco (CAN)	7
Forrest Molinari (USA)	8

=== Women's freestyle 72 kg ===
15 July

Legend

- F — Won by fall

Pos	Athlete	Pld	W	L	CP	TP	AIN	MGL	ROU
1	Kseniia Burakova (AIN)	2	2	0	6	8	—	4–4	4–3
2	Enkh-Amaryn Davaanasan (MGL)	2	1	1	4	7	1–3 VPO1	—	3–0
3	Cătălina Axente (ROU)	2	0	2	1	3	1–3 VPO1	0–3 VPO	—

Source: UWW

Pos	Athlete	Pld	W	L	CP	TP	KAZ	ITA	CAN
1	Zhamila Bakbergenova (KAZ)	2	2	0	6	16	—	7–3	9–4
2	Dalma Caneva (ITA)	2	1	1	6	10	1–3 VPO1	—	7–0 Fall
3	Shauna Kuebeck (CAN)	2	0	2	1	4	1–3 VPO1	0–5 VFA	—

Source: UWW

Semifinals
Kseniia Burakova (AIN)	0
Dalma Caneva (ITA)	4^{F}
Zhamila Bakbergenova (KAZ)	4
Enkh-Amaryn Davaanasan (MGL)	2

Final
Dalma Caneva (ITA)	1
Zhamila Bakbergenova (KAZ)	3
Bronze medal
Kseniia Burakova (AIN)	0
Enkh-Amaryn Davaanasan (MGL)	11

=== Women's freestyle 76 kg ===
15 July

Legend

- F — Won by fall

Round of 32
	Score	
Génesis Reasco (ECU)	12–0	Patrycja Sperka (POL)

Round of 16
Wang Juan (CHN)	1
Dymond Guilford (USA)	1
Génesis Reasco (ECU)	4
Cynthia Vescan (FRA)	0
Justina Di Stasio (CAN)	10
Jeong Seo-yeon (KOR)	0
Yasemin Adar (TUR)	0
Huang Yuanyuan (CHN)	4
Samar Amer (EGY)	13
Fanni Nađ (SRB)	0
Francy Rädelt (GER)	2
Epp Mäe (EST)	6
Yelena Makoyed (USA)	10
Kamilė Gaučaitė (LTU)	0
Qiandegenchagan (CHN)	10
Veronika Nyikos (HUN)	0

Quarterfinals
Wang Juan (CHN)	4
Génesis Reasco (ECU)	3
Justina Di Stasio (CAN)	5^{F}
Huang Yuanyuan (CHN)	1
Samar Amer (EGY)	2
Epp Mäe (EST)	8
Yelena Makoyed (USA)	1
Qiandegenchagan (CHN)	12

Semifinals
Wang Juan (CHN)	2^{F}
Justina Di Stasio (CAN)	3
Epp Mäe (EST)	4
Qiandegenchagan (CHN)	5

Final
Wang Juan (CHN)	4
Qiandegenchagan (CHN)	5

Repechage round 1
Dymond Guilford (USA)	1
Génesis Reasco (ECU)	2
Veronika Nyikos (HUN)	6
Yelena Makoyed (USA)	8^{F}

Bronze medal match
Génesis Reasco (ECU)	6
Justina Di Stasio (CAN)	0
Yelena Makoyed (USA)	9
Epp Mäe (EST)	6

== See also ==
- 2023 Polyák Imre & Varga János Memorial Tournament
