= 2023 Polyák Imre & Varga János Memorial Tournament =

UWW Wrestling event in Budapest, Hungary

Polyák Imre & Varga János Memorial Tournament
- Host city: Budapest, Hungary
- Dates: 13–16 July 2023
- Stadium: SYMA Sports and Conference Centre

Champions
- Freestyle: United States
- Greco-Roman: Azerbaijan
- Women: China

The 2023 Polyák Imre & Varga János Memorial Tournament, was a wrestling event held in Budapest, Hungary between 13 and 16 July 2023. It was held as the fourth of the ranking series of United World Wrestling in 2023. With an aim to reward wrestlers participating in Ranking Series tournaments, the United World Wrestling awarded prize money to the medal winners in all weight classes with a total prize money of 390,000 Swiss Francs. The gold medal winners at the four Ranking Series tournaments in 2023 received 1500 Swiss Francs with the silver medallists getting 750 Swiss Francs. The two bronze medallists received 500 Swiss Francs each.

== Ranking Series ==
Ranking Series Calendar 2023 of United World Wrestling:

- 1st Ranking Series: 1–5 February, Croatia, Zagreb ⇒ 2023 Grand Prix Zagreb Open
- 2nd Ranking Series: 23–26 February, Egypt, Alexandria ⇒ 2023 Ibrahim Moustafa Tournament
- 3rd Ranking Series: 1–4 June, Kyrgyzstan, Bishkek ⇒ 2023 Kaba Uulu Kozhomkul & Raatbek Sanatbaev Tournament
- 4th Ranking Series: 13–16 July, Hungary, Budapest ⇒ Polyák Imre & Varga János Memorial Tournament

== Competition schedule ==
All times are (UTC+1)

Date	Time	Event
13 July	10.30–15.00	Qualification rounds & repechage FS 57-65-74-86-92-97-125 kg
13 July	17.00–20.30	Final matches and awarding ceremony: FS 57-65-74-86-92-97-125 kg
14 July	10.30–15.00	Qualification rounds & repechage FS 61–70–79 kg & WW 50–53–57–62–68 kg
14 July	17.00–20.30	Final matches and awarding ceremony: FS 61–70–79 kg & WW 50–53–57–62–68 kg
15 July	10.30–15.00	Qualification rounds & repechage WW 55–59–65–72–76 kg & GR 55–60–63 kg
15 July	17.00–20.30	Final matches and awarding ceremony: WW 55–59–65–72–76 kg & GR 55–60–63 kg
16 July	10.30–15.00	Qualification rounds & repechage GR 67-72-77-82-87-97-130 kg
16 July	17.00–20.30	Final matches and awarding ceremony: GR 67-72-77-82-87-97-130 kg

== Medal table ==
* Host nation (Hungary)

Rank	Nation	Gold	Silver	Bronze	Total
1	United States	6	3	5	14
2	Hungary*	4	1	1	6
3	China	3	3	7	13
4	Azerbaijan	3	3	1	7
5	Iran	3	1	2	6
6	Kazakhstan	2	2	6	10
7	Moldova	2	1	1	4
8	Mongolia	2	0	2	4
9	Turkey	1	1	2	4
10	Kyrgyzstan	1	1	1	3
11	Ukraine	1	0	2	3
12	Albania	1	0	1	2
13	San Marino	1	0	0	1
14	Georgia	0	2	6	8
15	Bulgaria	0	2	0	2
15	Italy	0	2	0	2
17	Canada	0	1	2	3
17	Romania	0	1	2	3
17	South Korea	0	1	2	3
20	Ecuador	0	1	1	2
20	Nigeria	0	1	1	2
22	Greece	0	1	0	1
22	Israel	0	1	0	1
22	Poland	0	1	0	1
25	Finland	0	0	2	2
25	Individual Neutral Athletes	0	0	2	2
25	Sweden	0	0	2	2
28	Austria	0	0	1	1
28	Egypt	0	0	1	1
28	France	0	0	1	1
28	India	0	0	1	1
Totals (31 entries)		30	30	55	115

== Team ranking ==
Rank	Men's freestyle		Men's Greco-Roman		Women's freestyle	
Rank	Team	Points	Team	Points	Team	Points
1	United States	170	Azerbaijan	140	China	135
2	Kazakhstan	120	Hungary	113	United States	115
3	Georgia	85	Iran	98	Canada	80
4	Ukraine	71	Georgia	95	Mongolia	63
5	Hungary	64	Kazakhstan	74	Moldova	60
6	Iran	57	United States	64	Ecuador	41
7	China	55	South Korea	56	Poland	38
8	Kyrgyzstan	51	Finland	48	Germany	36
9	Germany	48	Sweden	48	Kazakhstan	35
10	Albania	40	Turkey	44	Nigeria	35

== Medal overview ==
=== Men's freestyle ===
Event	Gold	Silver	Bronze
57 kg	Zou Wanhao; China	Almaz Smanbekov; Kyrgyzstan	Kamil Kerimov; Ukraine
57 kg	Zou Wanhao; China	Almaz Smanbekov; Kyrgyzstan	Zane Richards; United States
61 kg	Zelimkhan Abakarov; Albania	Ossimzhan Dastanbek; Kazakhstan	Vito Arujau; United States
61 kg	Zelimkhan Abakarov; Albania	Ossimzhan Dastanbek; Kazakhstan	Assylzhan Yessengeldi; Kazakhstan
65 kg	Tömör-Ochiryn Tulga; Mongolia	Nick Lee; United States	Islam Dudaev; Albania
65 kg	Tömör-Ochiryn Tulga; Mongolia	Nick Lee; United States	Ikromzhon Khadzhimurodov; Kyrgyzstan
70 kg	Ihor Nykyforuk; Ukraine	Joseph McKenna; United States	Amr Reda Hussen; Egypt
70 kg	Ihor Nykyforuk; Ukraine	Joseph McKenna; United States	Sanzhar Doszhanov; Kazakhstan
74 kg	Murad Kuramagomedov; Hungary	Nurkozha Kaipanov; Kazakhstan	Krisztian Biro; Romania
74 kg	Murad Kuramagomedov; Hungary	Nurkozha Kaipanov; Kazakhstan	Lu Feng; China
79 kg	Mohammad Nokhodi; Iran	Vladimeri Gamkrelidze; Georgia	Chance Marsteller; United States
79 kg	Mohammad Nokhodi; Iran	Vladimeri Gamkrelidze; Georgia	Daniyar Kaisanov; Kazakhstan
86 kg	Myles Amine; San Marino	Dauren Kurugliev; Greece	Rakhim Magamadov; France
86 kg	Myles Amine; San Marino	Dauren Kurugliev; Greece	Osman Göçen; Turkey
92 kg	Zahid Valencia; United States	Matt Finesilver; Israel	Rizabek Aitmukhan; Kazakhstan
97 kg	Kyle Snyder; United States	Magomedkhan Magomedov; Azerbaijan	Givi Matcharashvili; Georgia
97 kg	Kyle Snyder; United States	Magomedkhan Magomedov; Azerbaijan	Alisher Yergali; Kazakhstan
125 kg	Mason Parris; United States	Dániel Ligeti; Hungary	Deng Zhiwei; China
125 kg	Mason Parris; United States	Dániel Ligeti; Hungary	Yurii Idzinskyi; Ukraine

=== Men's Greco-Roman ===
Event	Gold	Silver	Bronze
55 kg	Amangali Bekbolatov; Kazakhstan	Denis Mihai; Romania	Ramaz Silagava; Georgia
60 kg	Kerem Kamal; Turkey	Omid Arami; Iran	Nihat Mammadli; Azerbaijan
60 kg	Kerem Kamal; Turkey	Omid Arami; Iran	Chung Han-jae; South Korea
63 kg	Murad Mammadov; Azerbaijan	Jung Jin-woong; South Korea	Mukhamedali Mamurbek; Kazakhstan
63 kg	Murad Mammadov; Azerbaijan	Jung Jin-woong; South Korea	Victor Ciobanu; Moldova
67 kg	Hasrat Jafarov; Azerbaijan	Joni Khetsuriani; Georgia	Li Lei; China
67 kg	Hasrat Jafarov; Azerbaijan	Joni Khetsuriani; Georgia	Ryu Han-su; South Korea
72 kg	Danial Sohrabi; Iran	Ulvu Ganizade; Azerbaijan	Selçuk Can; Turkey
72 kg	Danial Sohrabi; Iran	Ulvu Ganizade; Azerbaijan	Otar Abuladze; Georgia
77 kg	Sanan Suleymanov; Azerbaijan	Kamal Bey; United States	Iuri Lomadze; Georgia
77 kg	Sanan Suleymanov; Azerbaijan	Kamal Bey; United States	Mohammad Naghousi; Iran
82 kg	Erik Szilvássy; Hungary	Mihail Bradu; Moldova	Zakarias Berg; Sweden
82 kg	Erik Szilvássy; Hungary	Mihail Bradu; Moldova	Gela Bolkvadze; Georgia
87 kg	Dávid Losonczi; Hungary	Semen Novikov; Bulgaria	Gurami Khetsuriani; Georgia
87 kg	Dávid Losonczi; Hungary	Semen Novikov; Bulgaria	Alex Kessidis; Sweden
97 kg	Tamás Lévai; Hungary	Nikoloz Kakhelashvili; Italy	Arvi Savolainen; Finland
97 kg	Tamás Lévai; Hungary	Nikoloz Kakhelashvili; Italy	Daniel Gastl; Austria
130 kg	Amir Ghasemi Monjazi; Iran	Beka Kandelaki; Azerbaijan	Ali Akbar Yousefi; Iran
130 kg	Amir Ghasemi Monjazi; Iran	Beka Kandelaki; Azerbaijan	Elias Kuosmanen; Finland

=== Women's freestyle ===
Event	Gold	Silver	Bronze
50 kg	Sarah Hildebrandt; United States	Feng Ziqi; China	Mercy Genesis; Nigeria
50 kg	Sarah Hildebrandt; United States	Feng Ziqi; China	Dolgorjavyn Otgonjargal; Mongolia
53 kg	Bat-Ochiryn Bolortuyaa; Mongolia	Lucía Yépez; Ecuador	Pang Qianyu; China
53 kg	Bat-Ochiryn Bolortuyaa; Mongolia	Lucía Yépez; Ecuador	Diana Weicker; Canada
55 kg	Jacarra Winchester; United States	Karla Godinez; Canada	Deng Li; China
55 kg	Jacarra Winchester; United States	Karla Godinez; Canada	Erika Bognár; Hungary
57 kg	Anastasia Nichita; Moldova	Hong Kexin; China	Zhang Qi; China
57 kg	Anastasia Nichita; Moldova	Hong Kexin; China	Hannah Taylor; Canada
59 kg	Jennifer Rogers; United States	Magdalena Głodek; Poland	Sangita Phogat; India
62 kg	Aisuluu Tynybekova; Kyrgyzstan	Bilyana Dudova; Bulgaria	Luo Xiaojuan; China
62 kg	Aisuluu Tynybekova; Kyrgyzstan	Bilyana Dudova; Bulgaria	Alina Kasabieva; Individual Neutral Athletes
65 kg	Irina Rîngaci; Moldova	Kadriye Aksoy; Turkey	Ekaterina Koshkina; Individual Neutral Athletes
68 kg	Zhou Feng; China	Blessing Oborududu; Nigeria	Alexandra Anghel; Romania
68 kg	Zhou Feng; China	Blessing Oborududu; Nigeria	Forrest Molinari; United States
72 kg	Zhamila Bakbergenova; Kazakhstan	Dalma Caneva; Italy	Enkh-Amaryn Davaanasan; Mongolia
76 kg	Qiandegenchagan; China	Wang Juan; China	Génesis Reasco; Ecuador
76 kg	Qiandegenchagan; China	Wang Juan; China	Yelena Makoyed; United States

== Participating nations ==
507 wrestlers from 48 countries:

1. Individual Neutral Athletes (6)
2. Albania (2)
3. Algeria (1)
4. Angola (3)
5. Argentina (2)
6. Austria (8)
7. Azerbaijan (14)
8. Brazil (7)
9. Bulgaria (4)
10. Canada (16)
11. Chile (1)
12. China (37)
13. Croatia (3)
14. Czech Republic (4)
15. Denmark (2)
16. Ecuador (6)
17. Egypt (9)
18. Spain (1)
19. Estonia (4)
20. Finland (8)
21. France (17)
22. Georgia (24)
23. Germany (15)
24. Greece (1)
25. Hungary (44) (Host)
26. India (2)
27. Iran (14)
28. Israel (5)
29. Italy (5)
30. Kazakhstan (51)
31. Kyrgyzstan (9)
32. South Korea (26)
33. Lithuania (10)
34. Moldova (9)
35. Mongolia (9)
36. Netherlands (2)
37. Norway (4)
38. Nigeria (3)
39. New Zealand (3)
40. Peru (4)
41. Poland (14)
42. Romania (12)
43. San Marino (1)
44. Serbia (1)
45. Sweden (9)
46. Turkey (20)
47. Ukraine (13)
48. United States (41)
49. Venezuela (1)

== Results ==
=== Men's freestyle ===
==== Men's freestyle 57 kg ====
Legend

- F — Won by fall

Round of 32
	Score	
Gamal Mohamed (EGY)	2–8	Roberti Dingashvili (GEO)

Round of 16
Zou Wanhao (CHN)	5
Kamil Kerimov (UKR)	0
Roberti Dingashvili (GEO)	11
Bekzat Almaz Uulu (KGZ)	11
Muhammed Balgabay (KAZ)	3
Abzal Okenov (KAZ)	2
Ahmad Javan (IRI)	4
Zandanbudyn Zanabazar (MGL)	1
Beka Bujiashvili (GEO)	0
Zane Richards (USA)	10
Horst Lehr (GER)	5
Milad Valizadeh (IRI)	4^{F}
Niklas Stechele (GER)	0
Almaz Smanbekov (KGZ)	2
Kim Sung-gwon (KOR)	13^{F}
Suraj Singh (NZL)	2

Quarterfinals
Zou Wanhao (CHN)	3
Roberti Dingashvili (GEO)	1
Muhammed Balgabay (KAZ)	0
Ahmad Javan (IRI)	7
Zane Richards (USA)	17
Milad Valizadeh (IRI)	6
Almaz Smanbekov (KGZ)	4
Kim Sung-gwon (KOR)	1

Semifinals
Zou Wanhao (CHN)	5
Ahmad Javan (IRI)	0
Zane Richards (USA)	2
Almaz Smanbekov (KGZ)	2

Final
Zou Wanhao (CHN)	11
Almaz Smanbekov (KGZ)	3

Repechage round 1
Kamil Kerimov (UKR)	12
Roberti Dingashvili (GEO)	2
Niklas Stechele (GER)	6
Kim Sung-gwon (KOR)	2

Bronze medal match
Kamil Kerimov (UKR)	8
Ahmad Javan (IRI)	4
Niklas Stechele (GER)	2
Zane Richards (USA)	5

==== Men's freestyle 61 kg ====
Legend

- F — Won by fall

Round of 16
Andrii Dzhelep (UKR)	17
Vladimir Kudrin (KAZ)	19
Vito Arujau (USA)	0
Zelimkhan Abakarov (ALB)	2
Narmandakhyn Narankhüü (MGL)	10
Arman Eloyan (FRA)	3
Daniel Popov (ISR)	1
Ossimzhan Dastanbek (KAZ)	4
Gamzatgadzsi Halidov (HUN)	1
Shota Phartenadze (GEO)	2

Quarterfinals
Ulukbek Zholdoshbekov (KGZ)	4
Vladimir Kudrin (KAZ)	8
Zelimkhan Abakarov (ALB)	11
Narmandakhyn Narankhüü (MGL)	1
Assylzhan Yessengeldi (KAZ)	1
Ossimzhan Dastanbek (KAZ)	6
Shota Phartenadze (GEO)	4
Yaroslav Hurskyy (UKR)	1

Semifinals
Vladimir Kudrin (KAZ)	6
Zelimkhan Abakarov (ALB)	12
Ossimzhan Dastanbek (KAZ)	6
Shota Phartenadze (GEO)	4

Final
Zelimkhan Abakarov (ALB)	4
Ossimzhan Dastanbek (KAZ)	1

Repechage round 1
Vito Arujau (USA)	10^{F}
Narmandakhyn Narankhüü (MGL)	0
Daniel Popov (ISR)	7
Assylzhan Yessengeldi (KAZ)	11

Bronze medal match
Vito Arujau (USA)	WO
Vladimir Kudrin (KAZ)
Assylzhan Yessengeldi (KAZ)	19
Shota Phartenadze (GEO)	9

==== Men's freestyle 65 kg ====
Legend

- F — Won by fall

Round of 32
	Score	
Khamzat Arsamerzouev (FRA)	14–8	Edemi Bolkvadze (GEO)
Alibek Osmonov (KGZ)	9–3	Wei Baowen (CHN)
Yuan Shaohua (CHN)	10–12	Iszmail Muszukajev (HUN)
Adlan Askarov (KAZ)	13–8	Marwane Yezza (FRA)

Round of 16
Islam Dudaev (ALB)	8
Agustín Destribats (ARG)	1
Khamzat Arsamerzouev (FRA)	2
Emrah Ormanoğlu (TUR)	1
Sanzhar Mukhtar (KAZ)	7
Alibek Osmonov (KGZ)	9^{F}
Nick Lee (USA)	10
Josh Finesilver (ISR)	0
Tömör-Ochiryn Tulga (MGL)	11
Ikromzhon Khadzhimurodov (KGZ)	0
Iszmail Muszukajev (HUN)	3
Kim Chang-su (KOR)	1
Akbar Kurbanov (KAZ)	12^{F}
Adlan Askarov (KAZ)	2
Andre Clarke (GER)	3
Lachlan McNeil (CAN)	5

Quarterfinals
Islam Dudaev (ALB)	11
Khamzat Arsamerzouev (FRA)	0
Alibek Osmonov (KGZ)	0
Nick Lee (USA)	10
Tömör-Ochiryn Tulga (MGL)	3
Iszmail Muszukajev (HUN)	0
Akbar Kurbanov (KAZ)	4
Lachlan McNeil (CAN)	6

Semifinals
Islam Dudaev (ALB)	4
Nick Lee (USA)	6
Tömör-Ochiryn Tulga (MGL)	10
Lachlan McNeil (CAN)	0

Final
Nick Lee (USA)	0
Tömör-Ochiryn Tulga (MGL)	10

Repechage round 1
Josh Finesilver (ISR)	5
Alibek Osmonov (KGZ)	6
Ikromzhon Khadzhimurodov (KGZ)	9
Iszmail Muszukajev (HUN)	8

Bronze medal match
Alibek Osmonov (KGZ)	5
Islam Dudaev (ALB)	11
Ikromzhon Khadzhimurodov (KGZ)	10
Lachlan McNeil (CAN)	0

==== Men's freestyle 70 kg ====
Legend

- F — Won by fall
- WO — Won by walkover

Round of 16
Giorgi Elbakidze (GEO)	2
Ernazar Akmataliev (KGZ)	5
Amr Reda Hussen (EGY)	11
Daniel Coles (CAN)	0
Ivan Kusyak (UKR)	4
Mohammad Shirkolaei (IRI)	7
Amir Mohammad Yazdani (IRI)	3
Dániel Antal (HUN)	0
Orozobek Toktomambetov (KGZ)	7
Yegor Anchugin (KAZ)	0
Joseph McKenna (USA)	8
Sanzhar Doszhanov (KAZ)	4

Quarterfinals
Ihor Nykyforuk (UKR)	8^{F}
Ernazar Akmataliev (KGZ)	0
Amr Reda Hussen (EGY)	11
Mohammad Shirkolaei (IRI)	7
Amir Mohammad Yazdani (IRI)	7
Orozobek Toktomambetov (KGZ)	7
Joseph McKenna (USA)	10
Syrbaz Talgat (KAZ)	6

Semifinals
Ihor Nykyforuk (UKR)	8^{F}
Amr Reda Hussen (EGY)	4
Amir Mohammad Yazdani (IRI)	8
Joseph McKenna (USA)	9

Final
Ihor Nykyforuk (UKR)	4
Joseph McKenna (USA)	2

Repechage round 1
Sanzhar Doszhanov (KAZ)	WO
Syrbaz Talgat (KAZ)

Bronze medal match
Ernazar Akmataliev (KGZ)	8
Amr Reda Hussen (EGY)	9
Sanzhar Doszhanov (KAZ)	5
Amir Mohammad Yazdani (IRI)	0

==== Men's freestyle 74 kg ====
Round of 32
	Score	
Cole Hawkins (NZL)	0–10	Gong Byung-min (KOR)
Tim Müller (GER)	0–9	Murad Kuramagomedov (HUN)

Round of 16
Nurkozha Kaipanov (KAZ)	11
Vadym Kurylenko (UKR)	0
Gong Byung-min (KOR)	6
Julian Ramírez (USA)	6
Otari Bagauri (GEO)	2
Xia Shengsong (CHN)	1
Adam Thomson (CAN)	2
Krisztian Biro (ROU)	13
Mitch Finesilver (ISR)	6
Olonbayaryn Süldkhüü (MGL)	2
Nurlan Bekzhanov (KAZ)	3
Tymur Hudyma (UKR)	2
César Alvan (BRA)	0
Murad Kuramagomedov (HUN)	11
Lu Feng (CHN)	6
Darkhan Yessengali (KAZ)	6

Quarterfinals
Nurkozha Kaipanov (KAZ)	9
Gong Byung-min (KOR)	1
Otari Bagauri (GEO)	1
Krisztian Biro (ROU)	2
Mitch Finesilver (ISR)	6
Nurlan Bekzhanov (KAZ)	1
Murad Kuramagomedov (HUN)	4
Lu Feng (CHN)	0

Semifinals
Nurkozha Kaipanov (KAZ)	5
Krisztian Biro (ROU)	0
Mitch Finesilver (ISR)	1
Murad Kuramagomedov (HUN)	4

Final
Nurkozha Kaipanov (KAZ)	2
Murad Kuramagomedov (HUN)	5

Repechage round 1
Tim Müller (GER)	10
César Alvan (BRA)	0

Repechage round 2
Vadym Kurylenko (UKR)	2
Gong Byung-min (KOR)	3
Tim Müller (GER)	1
Lu Feng (CHN)	12

Bronze medal match
Gong Byung-min (KOR)	7
Krisztian Biro (ROU)	8
Lu Feng (CHN)	8
Mitch Finesilver (ISR)	3

==== Men's freestyle 79 kg ====
Legend

- WO — Won by walkover

Round of 16
Simon Marchl (AUT)	0
Mohammad Nokhodi (IRI)	11
Chance Marsteller (USA)	4
Ramazan Sarı (TUR)	0
Oleksii Domanytskyi (UKR)	1
Ali Savadkouhi (IRI)	11
Avtandil Kentchadze (GEO)	8
Botond Lukács (HUN)	2
~~Bolat Sakayev (KAZ)~~
Saifedine Alekma (FRA)	WO
Daniyar Kaisanov (KAZ)	10
Francisco Kadima (ANG)	0
Vladimeri Gamkrelidze (GEO)	11
Muhammet Akdeniz (TUR)	0
Nurdaulet Kuanyshbay (KAZ)	8
İsa Demir (TUR)	6

Quarterfinals
Mohammad Nokhodi (IRI)	10
Chance Marsteller (USA)	0
Ali Savadkouhi (IRI)	4
Avtandil Kentchadze (GEO)	6
Saifedine Alekma (FRA)	0
Daniyar Kaisanov (KAZ)	10
Vladimeri Gamkrelidze (GEO)	11
Nurdaulet Kuanyshbay (KAZ)	0

Semifinals
Mohammad Nokhodi (IRI)	6
Avtandil Kentchadze (GEO)	2
Daniyar Kaisanov (KAZ)	6
Vladimeri Gamkrelidze (GEO)	14

Final
Mohammad Nokhodi (IRI)	3
Vladimeri Gamkrelidze (GEO)	0

Repechage round 1
Simon Marchl (AUT)	0
Chance Marsteller (USA)	11
Muhammet Akdeniz (TUR)	6
Nurdaulet Kuanyshbay (KAZ)	7

Bronze medal match
Chance Marsteller (USA)	4
Avtandil Kentchadze (GEO)	3
Nurdaulet Kuanyshbay (KAZ)	4
Daniyar Kaisanov (KAZ)	7

==== Men's freestyle 86 kg ====
Legend

- F — Won by fall
- WO — Won by walkover

Round of 32
	Score	
Maximus Hale (USA)	2–6	Dauren Kurugliev (GRE)}
Csaba Vida (HUN)	7–0	Patrik Püspöki (HUN)
Andrei Franț (ROU)	0–10	Tariel Gaphrindashvili (GEO)
Yeskali Dauletkazy (KAZ)	12–2	Bruno Nicoletti (BRA)
Kim Gwan-uk (KOR)	0–9	Rakhim Magamadov (FRA)
Aergen Jumabayi (CHN)	6–12	Vladyslav Prus (UKR)
Sebastian Jezierzański (POL)	2–4	Myles Amine (SMR)
Sun Xiao (CHN)	2–7	Ruslan Valiev (FRA)
Uri Kalashnikov (ISR)	10–1	Benjamin Greil (AUT)

Round of 16
Gangsuhe (CHN)	0
Dauren Kurugliev (GRE)	10
Csaba Vida (HUN)	8
Tariel Gaphrindashvili (GEO)	8^{F}
Akhmed Aibuev (FRA)	6
Yeskali Dauletkazy (KAZ)	3
Rakhim Magamadov (FRA)	7
Fatih Erdin (TUR)	6
Lars Schäfle (GER)	9
Vladyslav Prus (UKR)	1
Myles Amine (SMR)	11
Nurzhan Issagaliyev (KAZ)	1
Osman Göçen (TUR)	11
Ruslan Valiev (FRA)	0
Uri Kalashnikov (ISR)	0
Abubakr Abakarov (AZE)	8

Quarterfinals
Dauren Kurugliev (GRE)	5
Tariel Gaphrindashvili (GEO)	0
Akhmed Aibuev (FRA)	0
Rakhim Magamadov (FRA)	10
Lars Schäfle (GER)	0
Myles Amine (SMR)	5
Osman Göçen (TUR)	6
Abubakr Abakarov (AZE)	3

Semifinals
Dauren Kurugliev (GRE)	6
Rakhim Magamadov (FRA)	3
Myles Amine (SMR)	9
Osman Göçen (TUR)	8

Final
Dauren Kurugliev (GRE)	2
Myles Amine (SMR)	3

Repechage round 1
Maximus Hale (USA)	10^{F}
Gangsuhe (CHN)	0
Sebastian Jezierzański (POL)	5
Nurzhan Issagaliyev (KAZ)	1

Repechage round 2
Maximus Hale (USA)	10
Tariel Gaphrindashvili (GEO)	14
Sebastian Jezierzański (POL)
Lars Schäfle (GER)	WO

Bronze medal match
Tariel Gaphrindashvili (GEO)	0
Rakhim Magamadov (FRA)	2
Lars Schäfle (GER)	0
Osman Göçen (TUR)	8

==== Men's freestyle 92 kg ====
Legend

- WO — Won by walkover

Pos	Athlete	Pld	W	L	CP	TP	IRI	USA	GEO	UKR
1	Amir Ali Azarpira (IRI)	3	3	0	11	28	—	6–3	11–0	11–0
2	Zahid Valencia (USA)	3	2	1	7	16	1–3 VPO1	—	5–3	8–1
3	Miriani Maisuradze (GEO)	3	1	2	4	9	0–4 VSU	1–3 VPO1	—	6–1
4	Denys Sahaliuk (UKR)	3	0	3	2	2	0–4 VSU	1–3 VPO1	1–3 VPO1	—

Source: UWW

Pos	Athlete	Pld	W	L	CP	TP	KAZ	ISR	HUN
1	Rizabek Aitmukhan (KAZ)	2	1	1	5	13	—	2–8	11–0
2	Matt Finesilver (ISR)	2	1	1	4	12	3–1 VPO1	—	4–5
3	Balázs Juhász (HUN)	2	1	1	3	5	0–4 VSU	3–1 VPO1	—

Source: UWW

Semifinals
Amir Ali Azarpira (IRI)
Matt Finesilver (ISR)	WO
Rizabek Aitmukhan (KAZ)	0
Zahid Valencia (USA)	10

Final
Matt Finesilver (ISR)	0
Zahid Valencia (USA)	10
Bronze medal
Amir Ali Azarpira (IRI)
Rizabek Aitmukhan (KAZ)	WO

==== Men's freestyle 97 kg ====
Legend

- WO — Won by walkover

Round of 32
	Score	
Nishan Randhawa (CAN)	1–10	Givi Matcharashvili (GEO)

Round of 16
Kanybek Abdulkhairov (KGZ)	5
Habila Awusayiman (CHN)	3
Givi Matcharashvili (GEO)	2
Kyle Snyder (USA)	3
David Mchedlidze (UKR)	1
Bekzat Urkimbay (KAZ)	3
Ben Honis (ITA)	10
Richárd Végh (HUN)	2
Alatangalida (CHN)	5
Alisher Yergali (KAZ)	15
Magomedkhan Magomedov (AZE)	7
Vladislav Baitcaev (HUN)	6
Erik Thiele (GER)	5
Ryu Sung-yup (KOR)	0
Seo Ju-hwan (KOR)	1
Nursultan Azov (KAZ)	8

Quarterfinals
Kanybek Abdulkhairov (KGZ)	0
Kyle Snyder (USA)	10
Bekzat Urkimbay (KAZ)	5
Ben Honis (ITA)	1
Alisher Yergali (KAZ)	3
Magomedkhan Magomedov (AZE)	6
Erik Thiele (GER)	2
Nursultan Azov (KAZ)	1

Semifinals
Kyle Snyder (USA)	10
Bekzat Urkimbay (KAZ)	0
Magomedkhan Magomedov (AZE)	7
Erik Thiele (GER)	2

Final
Kyle Snyder (USA)	WO
Magomedkhan Magomedov (AZE)

Repechage round 1
Givi Matcharashvili (GEO)	11
Kanybek Abdulkhairov (KGZ)	0
Vladislav Baitcaev (HUN)	1
Alisher Yergali (KAZ)	3

Bronze medal match
Givi Matcharashvili (GEO)	9
Bekzat Urkimbay (KAZ)	0
Alisher Yergali (KAZ)	3
Erik Thiele (GER)	1

==== Men's freestyle 125 kg ====
Legend

- F — Won by fall
- R — Retired

Round of 16
Abraham Conyedo (ITA)	0
Mason Parris (USA)	10
Diaaeldin Kamal (EGY)	2
Youssif Hemida (EGY)	2
Johannes Ludescher (AUT)	0
Solomon Manashvili (GEO)	10
Deng Zhiwei (CHN)	9
Catriel Muriel (ARG)	2
Murazi Mchedlidze (UKR)	6
Buheeerdun (CHN)	2
Dániel Ligeti (HUN)	2
Gennadij Cudinovic (GER)	0
Yurii Idzinskyi (UKR)	10
Jung Yei-hyun (KOR)	0
Yusup Batirmurzaev (KAZ)	4
Omar Eyubov (KAZ)	0

Quarterfinals
Mason Parris (USA)	11
Youssif Hemida (EGY)	1
Solomon Manashvili (GEO)	2
Deng Zhiwei (CHN)	10
Murazi Mchedlidze (UKR)	0
Dániel Ligeti (HUN)	8
Yurii Idzinskyi (UKR)	11
Yusup Batirmurzaev (KAZ)	6

Semifinals
Mason Parris (USA)	5
Deng Zhiwei (CHN)	0
Dániel Ligeti (HUN)	9
Yurii Idzinskyi (UKR)	8

Final
Mason Parris (USA)	8
Dániel Ligeti (HUN)	4^{R}

Repechage round 1
Abraham Conyedo (ITA)	8
Youssif Hemida (EGY)	0
Gennadij Cudinovic (GER)	8^{F}
Murazi Mchedlidze (UKR)	3

Bronze medal match
Abraham Conyedo (ITA)	1
Deng Zhiwei (CHN)	6
Gennadij Cudinovic (GER)	6
Yurii Idzinskyi (UKR)	7

=== Men's Greco-Roman ===
==== Men's Greco-Roman 55 kg ====
Legend

- WO — Won by walkover

Pos	Athlete	Pld	W	L	CP	TP	KAZ	KAZ	USA	IRI
1	Amangali Bekbolatov (KAZ)	3	3	0	10	17	—	1–1	9–0	7–0
2	Yersin Abyir (KAZ)	3	1	2	5	7	1–3 VPO1	—	5–5	1–1
3	Brady Koontz (USA)	3	1	2	4	0	0–4 VSU	1–3 VPO1	—	4–1
4	Mahdi Ahadi Zenab (IRI)	3	1	2	4	2	0–3 VPO	3–1 VPO1	1–3 VPO1	—

Source: UWW

Pos	Athlete	Pld	W	L	CP	TP	AZE	EST	ROU
1	Denis Mihai (ROU)	2	2	0	9	12	—	12–1	WO
2	Ramaz Silagava (GEO)	2	1	1	6	1	1–4 VSU1	—	WO
—	Eldaniz Azizli (AZE)	2	0	2	0	0	0–5 VFO	0–5 VFO	—

Source: UWW

Semifinals
Amangali Bekbolatov (KAZ)	6
Ramaz Silagava (GEO)	1
Denis Mihai (ROU)	4
Yersin Abyir (KAZ)	1

Final
Amangali Bekbolatov (KAZ)	9
Denis Mihai (ROU)	0
Bronze medal
Ramaz Silagava (GEO)	5
Yersin Abyir (KAZ)	2

==== Men's Greco-Roman 60 kg ====
Legend

- F — Won by fall
- WO — Won by walkover

Round of 32
	Score	
Omid Arami (IRI)	3–1	Nihat Mammadli (AZE)
Kim Seung-hak (KOR)	3–2	Yernur Fidakhmetov (KAZ)
Joao Benavides (PER)	3–4	Alexander Bica (SWE)
Dalton Roberts (USA)	6–3	Răzvan Arnăut (ROU)
Nursultan Bazarbayev (KAZ)	4–6	Krisztián Kecskeméti (HUN)
József Andrási (HUN)	1–5	Chung Han-jae (KOR)

Round of 16
Ildar Hafizov (USA)	1
Erik Torba (HUN)	2
Omid Arami (IRI)	9
Aibek Sabyrbekov (KAZ)	1
Cao Liguo (CHN)	7
Kim Seung-hak (KOR)	10
Alexander Bica (SWE)	9
Jeremy Peralta (ECU)	1
Edmond Nazaryan (BUL)	9^{F}
Dalton Roberts (USA)	4
Krisztián Kecskeméti (HUN)	0
Nikolai Mohammadi (DEN)	9
Pridon Abuladze (GEO)	1
Chung Han-jae (KOR)	7
Kerem Kamal (TUR)	9
Haithem Mahmoud (EGY)	0

Quarterfinals
Erik Torba (HUN)	0
Omid Arami (IRI)	4
Kim Seung-hak (KOR)
Alexander Bica (SWE)	WO
Edmond Nazaryan (BUL)	5
Nikolai Mohammadi (DEN)	1
Chung Han-jae (KOR)	0
Kerem Kamal (TUR)	8

Semifinals
Omid Arami (IRI)	7
Alexander Bica (SWE)	2
Edmond Nazaryan (BUL)
Kerem Kamal (TUR)	WO

Final
Omid Arami (IRI)	1
Kerem Kamal (TUR)	8

Repechage round 1
Nihat Mammadli (AZE)	10
Aibek Sabyrbekov (KAZ)	1

Repechage round 2
Nihat Mammadli (AZE)	8
Erik Torba (HUN)	0
Haithem Mahmoud (EGY)	0
Chung Han-jae (KOR)	4

Bronze medal match
Nihat Mammadli (AZE)	10
Alexander Bica (SWE)	0
Chung Han-jae (KOR)	WO
Edmond Nazaryan (BUL)

==== Men's Greco-Roman 63 kg ====
Legend

- F — Won by fall
- WO — Won by walkover

Round of 16
Dávid Mányik (HUN)	1
Dastan Zarlykhanov (KAZ)	10
Mukhamedali Mamurbek (KAZ)	7^{F}
Tino Ojala (FIN)	2
Jung Jin-woong (KOR)	7
Yerzhet Zharlykassyn (KAZ)	5
~~Leri Abuladze (GEO)~~
Levente Tóth (HUN)	WO
Murad Mammadov (AZE)	9
Victor Ciobanu (MDA)	0

Quarterfinals
Aker Al-Obaidi (AUT)	8
Dastan Zarlykhanov (KAZ)	6
Mukhamedali Mamurbek (KAZ)	5
Jung Jin-woong (KOR)	4^{F}
Justas Petravičius (LTU)	9
Levente Tóth (HUN)	0
Murad Mammadov (AZE)	13
Xavier Johnson (USA)	3

Semifinals
Aker Al-Obaidi (AUT)
Jung Jin-woong (KOR)	WO
Justas Petravičius (LTU)	1
Murad Mammadov (AZE)	5

Final
Jung Jin-woong (KOR)	1
Murad Mammadov (AZE)	5

Repechage round 1
Yerzhet Zharlykassyn (KAZ)	0
Mukhamedali Mamurbek (KAZ)	9
Victor Ciobanu (MDA)	14^{F}
Xavier Johnson (USA)	4

Bronze medal match
Mukhamedali Mamurbek (KAZ)	WO
Aker Al-Obaidi (AUT)
Victor Ciobanu (MDA)	6^{F}
Justas Petravičius (LTU)	3

==== Men's Greco-Roman 67 kg ====
Legend

- C — Won by 3 cautions given to the opponent
- R — Retired

Round of 32
	Score	
Robert Perez III (USA)	2–11	Kwon Min-seong (KOR)
Ádám Pohilec (HUN)	1–5	Alejandro Sancho (USA)
Diego Chkhikvadze (GEO)	1–3	Husiyuetu (CHN)
Li Lei (CHN)	7–1	Néstor Almanza (CHI)
Nilton Soto (PER)	0–9	Niklas Öhlén (SWE)
Merey Bekenov (KAZ)	8–3	Valentin Petic (MDA)
Sultan Assetuly (KAZ)	0–8	Morten Thoresen (NOR)
Andrés Montaño (ECU)	7–3	Adomas Grigaliūnas (LTU)
Yang Seong-cheol (KOR)	1–7 3C	Dinmukhamed Koshkar (KAZ)

Round of 16
Mustafa Safa Yıldırım (TUR)	1
Kwon Min-seong (KOR)	3
Alejandro Sancho (USA)	4
Husiyuetu (CHN)	4
Joni Khetsuriani (GEO)	4
Li Lei (CHN)	2
Niklas Öhlén (SWE)	2
István Váncza (HUN)	4
Murat Fırat (TUR)	9
Merey Bekenov (KAZ)	0
Morten Thoresen (NOR)	2
Ryu Han-su (KOR)	7
Mihai Mihuț (ROU)	6
Andrés Montaño (ECU)	3
Dinmukhamed Koshkar (KAZ)	3
Hasrat Jafarov (AZE)	12

Quarterfinals
Kwon Min-seong (KOR)	4^{R}
Alejandro Sancho (USA)	1
Joni Khetsuriani (GEO)	9
István Váncza (HUN)	7
Murat Fırat (TUR)	1
Ryu Han-su (KOR)	2
Mihai Mihuț (ROU)	1
Hasrat Jafarov (AZE)	3

Semifinals
Alejandro Sancho (USA)	0
Joni Khetsuriani (GEO)	7
Ryu Han-su (KOR)	1
Hasrat Jafarov (AZE)	5

Final
Joni Khetsuriani (GEO)	1
Hasrat Jafarov (AZE)	6

Repechage round 1
Li Lei (CHN)	7
István Váncza (HUN)	5
Dinmukhamed Koshkar (KAZ)	2
Mihai Mihuț (ROU)	4

Bronze medal match
Li Lei (CHN)	1
Alejandro Sancho (USA)	1
Mihai Mihuț (ROU)	1
Ryu Han-su (KOR)	4

==== Men's Greco-Roman 72 kg ====
Legend

- WO — Won by walkover

Round of 16
Zaur Kabaloev (ITA)	4
Erik Persson (SWE)	5
Selçuk Can (TUR)	7
Toni Ojala (FIN)	1
Ulvu Ganizade (AZE)	6
Kristupas Šleiva (LTU)	0
Róbert Fritsch (HUN)	8
Krisztofer Klányi (HUN)	0
Danial Sohrabi (IRI)	6
Otar Abuladze (GEO)	0
Pat Smith (USA)	1
Elmer Mattila (FIN)	9

Quarterfinals
Daniyar Kalenov (KAZ)	4
Erik Persson (SWE)	2
Selçuk Can (TUR)	5
Ulvu Ganizade (AZE)	5
Róbert Fritsch (HUN)	1
Danial Sohrabi (IRI)	3
Elmer Mattila (FIN)	4
Levente Lévai (HUN)	5

Semifinals
Daniyar Kalenov (KAZ)	1
Ulvu Ganizade (AZE)	5
Danial Sohrabi (IRI)	8
Levente Lévai (HUN)	6

Final
Ulvu Ganizade (AZE)
Danial Sohrabi (IRI)	WO

Repechage round 1
Kristupas Šleiva (LTU)	1
Selçuk Can (TUR)	3
Otar Abuladze (GEO)	9
Róbert Fritsch (HUN)	0

Bronze medal match
Selçuk Can (TUR)	5
Daniyar Kalenov (KAZ)	1
Otar Abuladze (GEO)	8
Levente Lévai (HUN)	3

==== Men's Greco-Roman 77 kg ====
Legend

- F — Won by fall
- R — Retired

Round of 32
	Score	
Jonni Sarkkinen (FIN)	5–4	Alexandrin Guțu (MDA)
Attila Tösmagi (HUN)	1–7	Iuri Lomadze (GEO)
Park Dae-kun (KOR)	1–3	Azat Sadykov (KAZ)
Yüksel Sarıçiçek (TUR)	4–8	Bahejiang Halishan (CHN)
Zoltán Lévai (HUN)	4–2	Aik Mnatsakanian (BUL)
Mohammad Naghousi (IRI)	3–5	Kamal Bey (USA)
Mohamed Zahab Khalil (EGY)	1–3	Sachino Davitaia (GEO)

Round of 16
RaVaughn Perkins (USA)	1
Sanan Suleymanov (AZE)	3
Jonni Sarkkinen (FIN)	8
Juan Sebastian Aak (NOR)	4
Mikko Peltokangas (FIN)	3^{R}
Iuri Lomadze (GEO)	5
Azat Sadykov (KAZ)	9
Francisco Kadima (ANG)	0
Kaharman Kissymetov (KAZ)	2
Bahejiang Halishan (CHN)	5^{F}
Zoltán Lévai (HUN)	2
Maxat Yerezhepov (KAZ)	2
Oldřich Varga (CZE)	3
Kamal Bey (USA)	7
Sachino Davitaia (GEO)	1
Liu Rui (CHN)	1

Quarterfinals
Sanan Suleymanov (AZE)	5
Jonni Sarkkinen (FIN)	1
Iuri Lomadze (GEO)	3
Azat Sadykov (KAZ)	1
Bahejiang Halishan (CHN)	1
Zoltán Lévai (HUN)	3
Kamal Bey (USA)	8
Sachino Davitaia (GEO)	0

Semifinals
Sanan Suleymanov (AZE)	10
Iuri Lomadze (GEO)	0
Zoltán Lévai (HUN)	3
Kamal Bey (USA)	7

Final
Sanan Suleymanov (AZE)	4
Kamal Bey (USA)	1

Repechage round 1
Mohammad Naghousi (IRI)	3
Oldřich Varga (CZE)	1

Repechage round 2
RaVaughn Perkins (USA)	2
Jonni Sarkkinen (FIN)	3
Mohammad Naghousi (IRI)	8
Sachino Davitaia (GEO)	0

Bronze medal match
Jonni Sarkkinen (FIN)	0
Iuri Lomadze (GEO)	7
Mohammad Naghousi (IRI)	1
Zoltán Lévai (HUN)	1

==== Men's Greco-Roman 82 kg ====
Legend

- F — Won by fall

Round of 16
Mihail Bradu (MDA)	5
Zakarias Berg (SWE)	3

Quarterfinals
Michael Wagner (AUT)	0
Mihail Bradu (MDA)	3
Shamil Batyrov (KAZ)	0
Péter Dömök (HUN)	5
Dias Kalen (KAZ)	1
Gela Bolkvadze (GEO)	5
Spencer Woods (USA)	1
Erik Szilvássy (HUN)	2

Semifinals
Mihail Bradu (MDA)	1
Péter Dömök (HUN)	1
Gela Bolkvadze (GEO)	1
Erik Szilvássy (HUN)	1

Final
Mihail Bradu (MDA)	1
Erik Szilvássy (HUN)	3

Repechage round 1
Zakarias Berg (SWE)	10
Michael Wagner (AUT)	1

Bronze medal match
Zakarias Berg (SWE)	7
Péter Dömök (HUN)	1
Spencer Woods (USA)	0
Gela Bolkvadze (GEO)	4^{F}

==== Men's Greco-Roman 87 kg ====
Round of 32
	Score	
Sosruko Kodzokov (BRA)	3–1	Shin Byeong-cheol (KOR)
Marcel Sterkenburg (NED)	4–2	Matej Mandić (CRO)
Zac Braunagel (USA)	1–2	Rafig Huseynov (AZE)
Yevgeniy Polivadov (KAZ)	1–3	Peng Fei (CHN)
Park Sang-hyeok (KOR)	0–9	Dávid Losonczi (HUN)
Lukas Staudacher (AUT)	3–1	Qian Haitao (CHN)
István Takács (HUN)	3–1	Azamat Kustubayev (KAZ)

Round of 16
Islam Abbasov (AZE)	1
Semen Novikov (BUL)	3
Sosruko Kodzokov (BRA)	3
Nursultan Tursynov (KAZ)	5
Andreas Välis (EST)	3
Marcel Sterkenburg (NED)	2
Rafig Huseynov (AZE)	1
Gurami Khetsuriani (GEO)	4
Ioannis Narlidis (CAN)	2
Peng Fei (CHN)	9
Dávid Losonczi (HUN)	9
Bachir Sid Azara (ALG)	0
Alex Kessidis (SWE)	8
Lukas Staudacher (AUT)	0
István Takács (HUN)	3
Martynas Nemsevičius (LTU)	1

Quarterfinals
Semen Novikov (BUL)	7
Nursultan Tursynov (KAZ)	3
Andreas Välis (EST)	1
Gurami Khetsuriani (GEO)	1
Peng Fei (CHN)	0
Dávid Losonczi (HUN)	8
Alex Kessidis (SWE)	7
István Takács (HUN)	1

Semifinals
Semen Novikov (BUL)	9
Gurami Khetsuriani (GEO)	1
Dávid Losonczi (HUN)	6
Alex Kessidis (SWE)	0

Final
Semen Novikov (BUL)	0
Dávid Losonczi (HUN)	9

Repechage round 1
Park Sang-hyeok (KOR)	2
Bachir Sid Azara (ALG)	10

Repechage round 2
Islam Abbasov (AZE)	5
Nursultan Tursynov (KAZ)	1
Bachir Sid Azara (ALG)	3
Peng Fei (CHN)	1

Bronze medal match
Islam Abbasov (AZE)	2
Gurami Khetsuriani (GEO)	3
Bachir Sid Azara (ALG)	1
Alex Kessidis (SWE)	3

==== Men's Greco-Roman 97 kg ====
Round of 32
	Score	
Nikoloz Kakhelashvili (ITA)	3–0	Li Yiming (CHN)
Kristián Lukáč (CRO)	0–4	Felix Baldauf (NOR)
Markus Ragginger (AUT)	3–5	Vahid Dadkhah (IRI)
Mohamed Ali Gabr (EGY)	1–5	Daniel Gastl (AUT)
Igor Queiroz (BRA)	3–4	Kim Seung-jun (KOR)
Mathias Bak (DEN)	0–5	Tamás Lévai (HUN)

Round of 16
Olzhas Syrlybay (KAZ)	1
Mindaugas Venckaitis (LTU)	3
Nikoloz Kakhelashvili (ITA)	1
Arvi Savolainen (FIN)	1
Tyrone Sterkenburg (NED)	0
Felix Baldauf (NOR)	2
Vahid Dadkhah (IRI)	1
Joe Rau (USA)	10
Murat Lokyaev (AZE)	1
Daniel Gastl (AUT)	3
Kim Seung-jun (KOR)	1
Arif Niftullayev (AZE)	2
Lasha Tvildiani (GEO)	1
Tamás Lévai (HUN)	4
Lee Se-yeol (KOR)	1
Vinko Prodanović (CRO)	1

Quarterfinals
Mindaugas Venckaitis (LTU)	1
Nikoloz Kakhelashvili (ITA)	3
Felix Baldauf (NOR)	4
Joe Rau (USA)	0
Daniel Gastl (AUT)	5
Arif Niftullayev (AZE)	1
Tamás Lévai (HUN)	8
Lee Se-yeol (KOR)	0

Semifinals
Nikoloz Kakhelashvili (ITA)	3
Felix Baldauf (NOR)	1
Daniel Gastl (AUT)	1
Tamás Lévai (HUN)	7

Final
Nikoloz Kakhelashvili (ITA)	1
Tamás Lévai (HUN)	3

Repechage round 1
Li Yiming (CHN)	0
Arvi Savolainen (FIN)	4
Mathias Bak (DEN)	6
Lasha Tvildiani (GEO)	3

Repechage round 2
Arvi Savolainen (FIN)	1
Mindaugas Venckaitis (LTU)	1
Mathias Bak (DEN)	3
Lee Se-yeol (KOR)	1

Bronze medal match
Arvi Savolainen (FIN)	6
Felix Baldauf (NOR)	1
Mathias Bak (DEN)	1
Daniel Gastl (AUT)	6

==== Men's Greco-Roman 130 kg ====
Legend

- F — Won by fall
- WO — Won by walkover

Round of 32
	Score	
Ali Akbar Yousefi (IRI)	3–1	Cohlton Schultz (USA)
Adam Coon (USA)	1–3	Alin Alexuc-Ciurariu (ROU)
Anton Savenko (KAZ)	1–1	Meng Lingzhe (CHN)
Beka Kandelaki (AZE)	11–2	Marcel Albini (CZE)

Round of 16
Romas Fridrikas (LTU)	1
Sabah Shariati (AZE)	1
Ali Akbar Yousefi (IRI)	9
Iakobi Kajaia (GEO)	5
Rıza Kayaalp (TUR)	8
Alin Alexuc-Ciurariu (ROU)	1
Amir Ghasemi Monjazi (IRI)	1
Dáriusz Vitek (HUN)	1
Elias Kuosmanen (FIN)	2
Heiki Nabi (EST)	1
Meng Lingzhe (CHN)	1
Oskar Marvik (NOR)	1
Konsta Mäenpää (FIN)	1
Beka Kandelaki (AZE)	4
Kim Min-seok (KOR)	3
Lee Seung-chan (KOR)	3

Quarterfinals
Sabah Shariati (AZE)
Ali Akbar Yousefi (IRI)	WO
Rıza Kayaalp (TUR)
Amir Ghasemi Monjazi (IRI)	WO
Elias Kuosmanen (FIN)	2
Meng Lingzhe (CHN)	1
Beka Kandelaki (AZE)	2
Kim Min-seok (KOR)	1

Semifinals
Ali Akbar Yousefi (IRI)	2
Amir Ghasemi Monjazi (IRI)	2
Elias Kuosmanen (FIN)	1
Beka Kandelaki (AZE)	3

Final
Amir Ghasemi Monjazi (IRI)	3
Beka Kandelaki (AZE)	1

Repechage round 1
Marcel Albini (CZE)	5
Konsta Mäenpää (FIN)	5^{F}

Repechage round 2
Dáriusz Vitek (HUN)	WO
Rıza Kayaalp (TUR)
Konsta Mäenpää (FIN)	9
Kim Min-seok (KOR)	0

Bronze medal match
Dáriusz Vitek (HUN)	0
Ali Akbar Yousefi (IRI)	3
Konsta Mäenpää (FIN)	0
Elias Kuosmanen (FIN)	2

== See also ==
- 2023 Polyák Imre & Varga János Memorial Tournament – Women's freestyle
