= Mongolia at the 2024 Summer Olympics =

- IOC code: MGL
- NOC: Mongolian National Olympic Committee
- Website: www.olympic.mn (in Mongolian)

in Paris, France 26 July 2024 – 11 August 2024
- Competitors: 32 (14 men and 18 women) in 9 sports
- Flag bearers: Bat-Ochiryn Ser-Od & Oyuntsetsegiin Yesügen
- Medals Ranked 74th: Gold 0 Silver 1 Bronze 0 Total 1

Summer Olympics appearances (overview)
- 1964; 1968; 1972; 1976; 1980; 1984; 1988; 1992; 1996; 2000; 2004; 2008; 2012; 2016; 2020; 2024

Mongolia competed at the 2024 Summer Olympics in Paris from 26 July to 11 August 2024. Since the nation's debut in 1964, Mongolian athletes have appeared in every edition of the Summer Olympic Games, with the exception of the 1984 Summer Olympics in Los Angeles, because of its support of the Soviet boycott.

Judoka Bavuudorjiin Baasankhüü became Mongolia's sole medallist, winning silver on the first day of competition. Other notable athletes which include Tömör-Ochiryn Tulga, Dolgorjavyn Otgonjargal, Batkhuyagiin Khulan and Batkhuyagiin Khulan fell short of their bronze medals in Wrestling.

== Medalists ==
Medal	Name	Sport	Event	Date
Silver	Bavuudorjiin Baasankhüü	Judo	Women's −48 kg	27 July

Medals by sport
Sport	1st place, gold medalist(s)	2nd place, silver medalist(s)	3rd place, bronze medalist(s)	Total
Judo	0	1	0	1
Total	0	1	0	1

Medals by gender
Gender	1st place, gold medalist(s)	2nd place, silver medalist(s)	3rd place, bronze medalist(s)	Total
Female	0	1	0	1
Male	0	0	0	0
Mixed	0	0	0	0
Total	0	1	0	1

Medals by date
Date	1st place, gold medalist(s)	2nd place, silver medalist(s)	3rd place, bronze medalist(s)	Total
27 July	0	1	0	1
Total	0	1	0	1

== Competitors ==
The following is the list of number of competitors in the Games.

Sport	Men	Women	Total
Archery	1	0	1
Athletics	1	2	3
Boxing	0	2	2
Cycling	1	0	1
Judo	5	5	10
Shooting	2	1	3
Swimming	1	1	2
Weightlifting	0	1	1
Wrestling	3	6	9
Total	14	18	32

== Archery ==
One Mongolian archer qualified for the men's individual recurve by virtue of his result through the 2022 Asian Games in Hangzhou, China.

Athlete	Event	Ranking round		Round of 64	Round of 32	Round of 16	Quarterfinals	Semifinals	Final / BM	
Athlete	Event	Score	Seed	Opposition Score	Opposition Score	Opposition Score	Opposition Score	Opposition Score	Opposition Score	Rank
Baatarkhuyagiin Otgonbold	Men's individual	643	54	Grande (MEX); L 1–7	Did not advance					

== Athletics ==
Mongolian track and field athletes achieved the entry standards for Paris 2024, either by passing the direct qualifying mark (or time for track and road races) or by world ranking, in the following events (a maximum of 3 athletes each):

Key

- Note–Ranks given for track events are within the athlete's heat only
- Q = Qualified for the next round
- q = Qualified for the next round as a fastest loser or, in field events, by position without achieving the qualifying target
- NR = National record
- N/A = Round not applicable for the event
- Bye = Athlete not required to compete in round

Track and road events

Athlete	Event	Final	
Athlete	Event	Result	Rank
Bat-Ochiryn Ser-Od	Men's marathon	2:42:33	71
Galbadrakhyn Khishigsaikhan	Women's marathon	2:33:26	46
Bayartsogtyn Mönkhzayaa	Women's marathon	2:33:27	47

== Boxing ==
Mongolia entered two boxers into the Olympic tournament. Oyuntsetsegiin Yesügen (women's flyweight) secured their spots in their respective division by advancing to the final and semifinal at the 2022 Asian Games in Hangzhou, China. Möngöntsetsegiin Enkhjargal (women's bantamweight) secured her spots following the triumph in quota bouts round, at the 2024 World Olympic Qualification Tournament 2 in Bangkok, Thailand.

Athlete	Event	Round of 32	Round of 16	Quarterfinals	Semifinals	Final	
Athlete	Event	Opposition Result	Opposition Result	Opposition Result	Opposition Result	Opposition Result	Rank
Oyuntsetsegiin Yesügen	Women's 50 kg	Valencia (COL); L 0–5	Did not advance				
Möngöntsetsegiin Enkhjargal	Women's 54 kg	Charaabi (ITA); W 5–0	Perijoc (ROU); W 4–1	Akbaş (TUR); L 0–5	Did not advance		

== Cycling ==
=== Road ===
Mongolia entered one male rider to compete in the men's road race events at the Olympics, securing the quota through the UCI Nation Ranking.

Athlete	Event	Time	Rank
Jambaljamts Sainbayar	Men's Time Trial	40:19.93	28
Jambaljamts Sainbayar	Men's road race	6:28:31	57

== Judo ==
Mongolia qualified ten judokas via the IJF World Ranking List and continental quotas in Asia.

Athlete	Event	Round of 32	Round of 16	Quarterfinals	Semifinals	Repechage	Final / BM	
Athlete	Event	Opposition Result	Opposition Result	Opposition Result	Opposition Result	Opposition Result	Opposition Result	Rank
Enkhtaivany Ariunbold	Men's −60 kg	Samy (EGY); W 10–00	Mkheidze (FRA); L 00–10	Did not advance				9
Yondonperenlein Baskhüü	Men's −66 kg	Bye	Iadov (UKR); W 10–00	Lima (BRA); L 00–01	—N/a	Khyar (FRA); L 00–01	Did not advance	7
Batzayaagiin Erdenebayar	Men's −73 kg	Stump (SUI); W 01–00	Cases (ESP); W 01–00	Osmanov (MDA); L 00–10	—N/a	Hashimoto (JPN); L 00–10	Did not advance	7
Batkhuyagiin Gonchigsüren	Men's −100 kg	Paltchik (ISR); L 00–10	Did not advance					17
Odkhüügiin Tsetsentsengel	Men's +100 kg	Abramov (GER); L 00–01	Did not advance					17
Bavuudorjiin Baasankhüü	Women's −48 kg	Esposito (MLT); W 10–00	Tanzer (AUT); W 10–00	Narváez (PAR); W 10–00	Martínez (ESP); W 10–00	—N/a	Tsunoda (JPN); L 00–01	2nd place, silver medalist(s)
Lkhagvasürengiin Sosorbaram	Women's −52 kg	Toro (ESP); W 10–00	Pupp (HUN); L 00–10	Did not advance				9
Lkhagvatogoogiin Enkhriilen	Women's −57 kg	Gjakova (KOS); W 10–00	Starke (GER); W 11–01	Huh (KOR); L 00–01	—N/a	Liparteliani (GEO); L 00–10	Did not advance	7
Otgonbayaryn Khüslen	Women's −78 kg	Vanessa (ECU); W 01–00	Lanir (ISR); L 00–10	Did not advance				9
Amarsaikhany Adiyaasüren	Women's +78 kg	Berlikash (KAZ); W 10–00	Ozdemir (TUR); L 00–10	Did not advance				9

Mixed

Athlete	Event	Round of 32	Round of 16	Quarterfinals	Semifinals	Repechage	Final / BM	
Athlete	Event	Opposition Result	Opposition Result	Opposition Result	Opposition Result	Opposition Result	Opposition Result	Rank
Lkhagvasürengiin Sosorbaram; Lkhagvatogoogiin Enkhriilen; Amarsaikhany Adiyaasüren; Yondonperenlein Baskhüü; Batzayaagiin Erdenebayar; Batkhuyagiin Gonchigsüren	Team	Israel; L 3–4	Did not advance					17

== Shooting ==
Mongolian shooters achieved quota places for the following events based on their results at the 2022 and 2023 ISSF World Championships, 2023 and 2024 Asian Championships, and 2024 ISSF World Olympic Qualification Tournament.

Athlete	Event	Qualification		Final	
Athlete	Event	Points	Rank	Points	Rank
Enkhtaivany Davaakhüü	Men's 10 m air pistol	578-21x	7 Q	115.7	8
Enkhtaivany Davaakhüü	25 m rapid fire pistol	578-20x	20	Did not advance	
Nyantaigiin Bayaraa	Men's 50 m rifle 3 positions	584-26x	30	Did not advance	
Nyantaigiin Bayaraa	Men's 10 m air rifle	627.0	29	Did not advance	
Oyuunbatyn Yesügen	Women's 50 m rifle 3 positions	589-40x	4 Q	407.6	7
Oyuunbatyn Yesügen	Women's 10 metre rifle	627.6	18	Did not advance	
Oyuunbatyn Yesügen; Nyantaigiin Bayaraa	Mixed 10 metre air rifle team	625.4	16	Did not advance	

== Swimming ==
Mongolia sent two swimmers to compete at the 2024 Paris Olympics.

Athlete	Event	Heat		Semifinal		Final	
Athlete	Event	Time	Rank	Time	Rank	Time	Rank
Batbayaryn Enkhtamir	Men's 100 m freestyle	50.81	50	Did not advance			
Batbayaryn Enkhkhüslen	Women's 200 m freestyle	1:59.94	18	Did not advance			

== Weightlifting ==
Mongolia entered one weightlifter into the Olympic competition. Mönkhjantsangiin Ankhtsetseg secured one of the top ten slots in women's under 81 kg divisions based on the IWF Olympic Qualification Rankings.

Athlete	Event	Snatch	Clean & Jerk	Total	Rank
Athlete	Event	Result	Result	Total	Rank
Mönkhjantsangiin Ankhtsetseg	Women's −81 kg	100	125	225	10

== Wrestling ==
Mongolia qualified nine wrestlers for the following classes into the Olympic competition. Dolgorjavyn Otgonjargal and Enkhsaikhany Delgermaa qualified for the games by virtue of top five results through the 2023 World Championships in Belgrade, Serbia; three wrestlers qualified for the games by winning their semifinal round, in their respective divisions, at the 2024 Asian Olympic Qualification Tournament in Bishkek, Kyrgyzstan; and three wrestlers qualified for the games through the 2024 World Qualification Tournament in Istanbul, Turkey.

Key:

- WO – walkover
- VT (ranking points: 5–0 or 0–5) – Victory by fall.
- VB (ranking points: 5–0 or 0–5) – Victory by injury (VF for forfeit, VA for withdrawal or disqualification)
- PP (ranking points: 3–1 or 1–3) – Decision by points – the loser with technical points.
- PO (ranking points: 3–0 or 0–3) – Decision by points – the loser without technical points.
- ST (ranking points: 4–0 or 0–4) – Great superiority – the loser without technical points and a margin of victory of at least 8 (Greco-Roman) or 10 (freestyle) points.
- SP (ranking points: 4–1 or 1–4) – Technical superiority – the loser with technical points and a margin of victory of at least 8 (Greco-Roman) or 10 (freestyle) points.

Freestyle

Athlete	Event	Round of 16	Quarterfinal	Semifinal	Repechage	Final / BM	
Athlete	Event	Opposition Result	Opposition Result	Opposition Result	Opposition Result	Opposition Result	Rank
Tömör-Ochiryn Tulga	Men's −65 kg	Valdés (CUB); W 5–0	Tevanyan (ARM); W 7–5	Kiyooka (JPN); L 1–5	—N/a	Rivera (PUR); L 9–10	5
Byambasürengiin Bat-Erdene	Men's −86 kg	Nurmagomedov (AZE); L 2–11	Did not advance				12
Mönkhtöriin Lkhagvagerel	Men's −125 kg	Parris (USA); W 10–5	Meshvildishvili (AZE); L 2–12	Did not advance			8
Dolgorjavyn Otgonjargal	Women's −50 kg	Liuzzi (ITA); W WO	Stadnik (AZE); W 4–4^{VPO1}	Hildebrandt (USA); L 0–5	—N/a	Ziqi (CHN); L 4–6	5
Batkhuyagiin Khulan	Women's −53 kg	Ogunsanya (NGR); W 3^{F}–1	Fujinami (JPN); L 2–8^{F}	—N/a	Parrish (USA); W 10^{F}–4	Qianyu (CHN); L 2–6^{F}	5
Boldsaikhan Khongorzul	Women's −57 kg	Kexin (CHN); L 12–16	Did not advance				11
Pürevdorjiin Orkhon	Women's −62 kg	Koliadenko (UKR); L 7–8	—N/a		Dudova (BUL); W 3–1	Tynybekova (KGZ); L 6–6*	5
Enkhsaikhany Delgermaa	Women's −68 kg	Zhumanazarova (KGZ); L 3–8 ^{PP}	—N/a		Ozaki (JPN); L 0–6^{F}	Did not advance	13
Enkh-Amaryn Davaanasan	Women's −76 kg	Rueben (NGR); W 5–2 ^{PP}	Rentería (COL); L 3–6 ^{PP}	Did not advance			9

== Other Mongolians ==
Athlete	Representing	Event	Result
Bayanmönkhiin Narmandakh	United Arab Emirates	Men's −66 kg	17
Bishreltiin Khorloodoi	United Arab Emirates	Women's −52 kg	9

== See also ==
- Mongolia at the 2024 Summer Paralympics
- Mongolia at the 2024 Winter Youth Olympics
