= 2023 World Wrestling Championships – Women's freestyle 50 kg =

Wrestling competitions

Women's freestyle 50 kg at the 2023 World Championships
- Venue: Štark Arena
- Dates: 19–20 September 2023
- Competitors: 28 from 25 nations

Medalists
gold medal	Yui Susaki	Japan
silver medal	Dolgorjavyn Otgonjargal	Mongolia
bronze medal	Feng Ziqi	China
bronze medal	Sarah Hildebrandt	United States

The women's freestyle 50 kg is a competition featured at the 2023 World Wrestling Championships, and was held in Belgrade, Serbia on 19 and 20 September 2023.

This freestyle wrestling competition consists of a single-elimination tournament, with a repechage used to determine the winner of two bronze medals. The two finalists face off for gold and silver medals. Each wrestler who loses to one of the two finalists moves into the repechage, culminating in a pair of bronze medal matches featuring the semifinal losers each facing the remaining repechage opponent from their half of the bracket.

== Results ==
Legend

- F — Won by fall

=== Final ===
Final
Yui Susaki (JPN)	10
Dolgorjavyn Otgonjargal (MGL)	0

=== Top half ===
Round of 32
Alisson Cardozo (COL)	4
Gabija Dilytė (LTU)	1
Alina Vuc (ROU)	4
Szimonetta Szekér (HUN)	3
Veronika Ryabovolova (MKD)	0
Mercy Genesis (NGR)	10
Anna Łukasiak (POL)	1
Oksana Livach (UKR)	2
Neelam Sirohi (UWW)	10
Maral Tangirbergenova (KAZ)	0
Emanuela Liuzzi (ITA)	4
Jacqueline Mollocana (ECU)	5

Round of 16
Yui Susaki (JPN)	12
Alisson Cardozo (COL)	1
Alina Vuc (ROU)	8
Mercy Genesis (NGR)	4
Oksana Livach (UKR)	4
Neelam Sirohi (UWW)	6
Jacqueline Mollocana (ECU)	4
Feng Ziqi (CHN)	14

Quarterfinals
Yui Susaki (JPN)	4^{F}
Alina Vuc (ROU)	0
Neelam Sirohi (UWW)	0
Feng Ziqi (CHN)	2^{F}

Semifinals
Yui Susaki (JPN)	8
Feng Ziqi (CHN)	2

=== Bottom half ===
Round of 32
Julie Sabatié (FRA)	1
Evin Demirhan Yavuz (TUR)	4
Kamila Barbosa (BRA)	0
Kseniya Stankevich (AIN)	10
Paulina Duenas (GUM)	0
Madison Parks (CAN)	8^{F}
Jasmina Immaeva (UZB)	2
Polina Lukina (AIN)	2^{F}
Yusneylys Guzmán (CUB)	2
Mariya Stadnik (AZE)	7
Kwon Mi-seon (KOR)	3
Emma Wangila (KEN)	1

Round of 16
Dolgorjavyn Otgonjargal (MGL)	8
Evin Demirhan Yavuz (TUR)	3
Kseniya Stankevich (AIN)	13
Madison Parks (CAN)	11
Polina Lukina (AIN)	1
Mariya Stadnik (AZE)	12
Kwon Mi-seon (KOR)	0
Sarah Hildebrandt (USA)	10

Quarterfinals
Dolgorjavyn Otgonjargal (MGL)	12
Kseniya Stankevich (AIN)	1
Mariya Stadnik (AZE)	3
Sarah Hildebrandt (USA)	14

Semifinals
Dolgorjavyn Otgonjargal (MGL)	7
Sarah Hildebrandt (USA)	5

=== Repechage ===
Repechage round 2
Alisson Cardozo (COL)	7^{F}
Alina Vuc (ROU)	2
Evin Demirhan Yavuz (TUR)	11
Kseniya Stankevich (AIN)	2

Bronze medals
Alisson Cardozo (COL)	0
Feng Ziqi (CHN)	10
Evin Demirhan Yavuz (TUR)	0
Sarah Hildebrandt (USA)	5

Olympic wrestle-off
Alisson Cardozo (COL)	1
Evin Demirhan Yavuz (TUR)	4

== Final standing ==
Rank	Athlete
1st place, gold medalist(s)	Yui Susaki (JPN)
2nd place, silver medalist(s)	Dolgorjavyn Otgonjargal (MGL)
3rd place, bronze medalist(s)	Feng Ziqi (CHN)
3rd place, bronze medalist(s)	Sarah Hildebrandt (USA)
5	Evin Demirhan Yavuz (TUR)
5	Alisson Cardozo (COL)
7	Kseniya Stankevich (AIN)
8	Mariya Stadnik (AZE)
9	Neelam Sirohi (UWW)
10	Madison Parks (CAN)
11	Polina Lukina (AIN)
12	Alina Vuc (ROU)
13	Mercy Genesis (NGR)
14	Jacqueline Mollocana (ECU)
15	Oksana Livach (UKR)
16	Kwon Mi-seon (KOR)
17	Emanuela Liuzzi (ITA)
18	Szimonetta Szekér (HUN)
19	Yusneylys Guzmán (CUB)
20	Anna Łukasiak (POL)
21	Emma Wangila (KEN)
22	Gabija Dilytė (LTU)
23	Julie Sabatié (FRA)
24	Jasmina Immaeva (UZB)
25	Paulina Duenas (GUM)
26	Veronika Ryabovolova (MKD)
27	Maral Tangirbergenova (KAZ)
28	Kamila Barbosa (BRA)

Qualified for the 2024 Summer Olympics
