= 2026 World Wrestling Championships – Women's freestyle 50 kg =

Wrestling competitions

Women's freestyle 50 kg at the 2026 World Championships
- Venue: Barys Arena
- Dates: 27–28 October 2026
- Competitors: 24 from 24 nations

Medalists
gold medal	Yui Susaki	Japan
silver medal	Neelam Sirohi	India
bronze medal	Zeinep Bayanova	Kazakhstan
bronze medal	Feng Ziqi	China

The women's freestyle 50 kilograms is a competition featured at the 2026 World Wrestling Championships, and was held in Astana, Kazakhstan on 27 and 28 October 2026.

This freestyle wrestling competition consists of a single-elimination tournament, with a repechage used to determine the winner of two bronze medals. The two finalists face off for gold and silver medals. Each wrestler who loses to one of the two finalists moves into the repechage, culminating in a pair of bronze medal matches, featuring the semifinal losers each facing the remaining repechage opponent from their half of the bracket.

== Results ==
Legend

- D — Disqualified
- F — Won by fall
- WO — Won by walkover

=== Final ===
Final
Neelam Sirohi (IND)	0
Yui Susaki (JPN)	5^{F}

=== Top half ===
Round of 32
Morgan Turner (USA)	5
Greili Bencosme (CUB)	0
Natallia Varakina (BLR)	5^{F}
Maria Leorda (MDA)	0
Dolgorjavyn Otgonjargal (MGL)	12^{F}
Hajar Kaneb (MAR)	0
Aktenge Keunimjaeva (UZB)	10
Jacqueline Mollocana (ECU)	2

Round of 16
Elizaveta Smirnova (RUS)	9
Morgan Turner (USA)	7^{D}
Natallia Varakina (BLR)	0
Neelam Sirohi (IND)	6
Agata Gołuchowska (POL)	0
Dolgorjavyn Otgonjargal (MGL)	11
Aktenge Keunimjaeva (UZB)	3
Zeinep Bayanova (KAZ)	7

Quarterfinals
Elizaveta Smirnova (RUS)
Neelam Sirohi (IND)	WO
Dolgorjavyn Otgonjargal (MGL)	4
Zeinep Bayanova (KAZ)	5

Semifinals
Neelam Sirohi (IND)	7
Zeinep Bayanova (KAZ)	3

=== Bottom half ===
Round of 32
Yui Susaki (JPN)	10
Gabija Dilytė (LTU)	0
Ibtissem Doudou (ALG)	0
Thalia Freitas (BRA)	9
Mercy Genesis (NGR)	10
Chahrazed Ayachi (TUN)	0
Nipuni Wasana (SRI)	0
Katie Dutchak (CAN)	9^{F}

Round of 16
Oksana Livach (UKR)	0
Yui Susaki (JPN)	10
Thalia Freitas (BRA)	2
Nohalis Loyo (VEN)	9
Feng Ziqi (CHN)	5
Mercy Genesis (NGR)	0
Katie Dutchak (CAN)	5^{F}
Evin Demirhan Yavuz (TUR)	0

Quarterfinals
Yui Susaki (JPN)	10
Nohalis Loyo (VEN)	0
Feng Ziqi (CHN)	11
Katie Dutchak (CAN)	1

Semifinals
Yui Susaki (JPN)	9
Feng Ziqi (CHN)	0

=== Repechage ===
Repechage round 1
Gabija Dilytė (LTU)	0
Oksana Livach (UKR)	11

Repechage round 2
Natallia Varakina (BLR)	WO
Elizaveta Smirnova (RUS)
Oksana Livach (UKR)	10
Nohalis Loyo (VEN)	0

Bronze medals
Natallia Varakina (BLR)	1
Zeinep Bayanova (KAZ)	6
Oksana Livach (UKR)	0
Feng Ziqi (CHN)	10

== Final standing ==
Rank	Athlete
1st place, gold medalist(s)	Yui Susaki (JPN)
2nd place, silver medalist(s)	Neelam Sirohi (IND)
3rd place, bronze medalist(s)	Zeinep Bayanova (KAZ)
3rd place, bronze medalist(s)	Feng Ziqi (CHN)
5	Natallia Varakina (BLR)
5	Oksana Livach (UKR)
7	Katie Dutchak (CAN)
8	Dolgorjavyn Otgonjargal (MGL)
9	Elizaveta Smirnova (RUS)
10	Mercy Genesis (NGR)
11	Aktenge Keunimjaeva (UZB)
12	Thalia Freitas (BRA)
13	Nohalis Loyo (VEN)
14	Jacqueline Mollocana (ECU)
15	Evin Demirhan Yavuz (TUR)
16	Greili Bencosme (CUB)
17	Maria Leorda (MDA)
18	Ibtissem Doudou (ALG)
19	Nipuni Wasana (SRI)
20	Chahrazed Ayachi (TUN)
21	Agata Gołuchowska (POL)
22	Hajar Kaneb (MAR)
23	Gabija Dilytė (LTU)
—	Morgan Turner (USA)
