= Wrestling at the 2024 Summer Olympics – Women's freestyle 50 kg =

Women's freestyle 50 kg at the Games of the XXXIII Olympiad
- Venue: Grand Palais Éphémère
- Date: 6–7 August 2024
- Competitors: 16 from 16 nations

Medalists
1st place, gold medalist(s)		Sarah Hildebrandt	United States
2nd place, silver medalist(s)		Yusneylys Guzmán	Cuba
3rd place, bronze medalist(s)		Yui Susaki	Japan
3rd place, bronze medalist(s)		Feng Ziqi	China

Women's freestyle 50 kilograms competition at the 2024 Summer Olympics in Paris, France, took place on 6–7 August 2024 at the Grand Palais Éphémère in Champ de Mars.

== Background ==
This was the sixth appearance of the women's freestyle flyweight category, debut in 2004 and it has appeared in every games since then.

- 2004-2016: 48kg
- 2020-current: 50kg

Returned 2020 bronze medalist Sarah Hildebrandt won the event by defeating Yusneylys Guzmán in the final, defending 2020 champion Yui Susaki and Feng Ziqi won the bronze medals with Feng going through repechage.

== Format ==
This freestyle wrestling competition consists of a single-elimination tournament, with a repechage used to determine the winner of two bronze medals. The two finalists face off for gold and silver medals. Each wrestler who loses to one of the two finalists moves into the repechage, culminating in a pair of bronze medal matches featuring the semifinal losers each facing the remaining repechage opponent from their half of the bracket.

== Rules ==
A typical bout consists of two halves of three minutes each separated by a 30-second break. The two competitors compete on a mat, which is nine meters in diameter. Wrestlers try to score points by executing various legal maneuvers. Points ranging from one to five are awarded by the mat referee depending on the degree of difficulty of the maneuvers. Points are also awarded to the opponent in case of infractions such as illegal holds, passivity etc. A wrestler is automatically disqualified if three cautions are awarded during a bout. Forcing an opponent's shoulders to the mat results in an instant victory by fall.

During the course of a match, if a wrestler builds a 10-point advantage over the opponent, the bout is stopped and the leader is declared as the winner by technical superiority. The total scores are totaled at the end of the stipulated six-minute period, and the wrestler with the maximum points wins. In case of a tie, the wrestler who has scored the last point is declared the winner. A competitor might also be declared a winner if the opponent does not turn up or is medically unfit to compete.

== Qualification ==
Sixteen quota places were available with each nation restricted to a maximum of one spot. Five quota places were awarded at the 2023 World Wrestling Championships, which took place from the 16th to 24th of September in Belgrade, Serbia. The finalists of each category in the four continental qualification tournaments (Asia, Europe, the Americas, and the joint Africa & Oceania) were awarded quota places. The remainder of the total quota was allocated at the 2024 World Wrestling Olympic Qualification Tournament, offering a minimum of three quota places.

== Schedule ==
All times are Central European Time (UTC+02:00)

Date	Time	Event
6 August 2024	11:00	Qualification rounds
6 August 2024	18:15	Semifinals
7 August 2024	11:00	Repechage
7 August 2024	19:30	Finals

== Results ==
Sixteen athletes qualified for the competition.

Legend

- F — Won by fall
- WO — Won by walkover

=== Main bracket ===
Round of 16
Yui Susaki (JPN)	2
Vinesh Phogat (IND)	3
Aktenge Keunimjaeva (UZB)	0
Oksana Livach (UKR)	10
Alisson Cardozo (COL)	0
Gabija Dilytė (LTU)	6^{F}
Yusneylys Guzmán (CUB)	7
Evin Demirhan Yavuz (TUR)	6
Feng Ziqi (CHN)	7^{F}
Nada Medani (EGY)	2
Ibtissem Doudou (ALG)	0
Sarah Hildebrandt (USA)	10
Mariya Stadnik (AZE)	6
Anastasia Blayvas (GER)	2
Emanuela Liuzzi (ITA) (Note: Otgonjargal won on walkover after Liuzzi was disqualified for failing to appear for the weigh-in on the morning of the competition.)
Dolgorjavyn Otgonjargal (MGL)	WO

Quarterfinals
Vinesh Phogat (IND)	7
Oksana Livach (UKR)	5
Gabija Dilytė (LTU)	0
Yusneylys Guzmán (CUB)	10
Feng Ziqi (CHN)	4
Sarah Hildebrandt (USA)	7
Mariya Stadnik (AZE)	4
Dolgorjavyn Otgonjargal (MGL)	4

Semifinals
~~Vinesh Phogat (IND)~~ (Note: Phogat initially qualified for the final, but was later disqualified for being over the 50kg weight limit in the weigh-in on the morning of the final. As a result, she was eliminated from the medal competition, and Yusneylys Guzmán was awarded her place in the final.)	5
Yusneylys Guzmán (CUB)	0
Sarah Hildebrandt (USA)	5
Dolgorjavyn Otgonjargal (MGL)	0

Gold medal match
Yusneylys Guzmán (CUB)	0
Sarah Hildebrandt (USA)	3

=== Repechage ===
Repechage
Ibtissem Doudou (ALG)	0
Feng Ziqi (CHN)	10

Bronze medal matches
Yui Susaki (JPN)	10
Oksana Livach (UKR)	0
Feng Ziqi (CHN)	6
Dolgorjavyn Otgonjargal (MGL)	4

== Final standing ==
Rank	Athlete
1st place, gold medalist(s)	Sarah Hildebrandt (USA)
2nd place, silver medalist(s)	Yusneylys Guzmán (CUB)
3rd place, bronze medalist(s)	Yui Susaki (JPN)
3rd place, bronze medalist(s)	Feng Ziqi (CHN)
5	Oksana Livach (UKR)
5	Dolgorjavyn Otgonjargal (MGL)
7	Gabija Dilytė (LTU)
8	Mariya Stadnik (AZE)
9	Evin Demirhan Yavuz (TUR)
10	Anastasia Blayvas (GER)
11	Nada Medani (EGY)
12	Alisson Cardozo (COL)
13	Aktenge Keunimjaeva (UZB)
14	Ibtissem Doudou (ALG)
LFO	Vinesh Phogat (IND)
LFO	Emanuela Liuzzi (ITA)
