= Yui Susaki =

Japanese freestyle wrestler (born 1999)

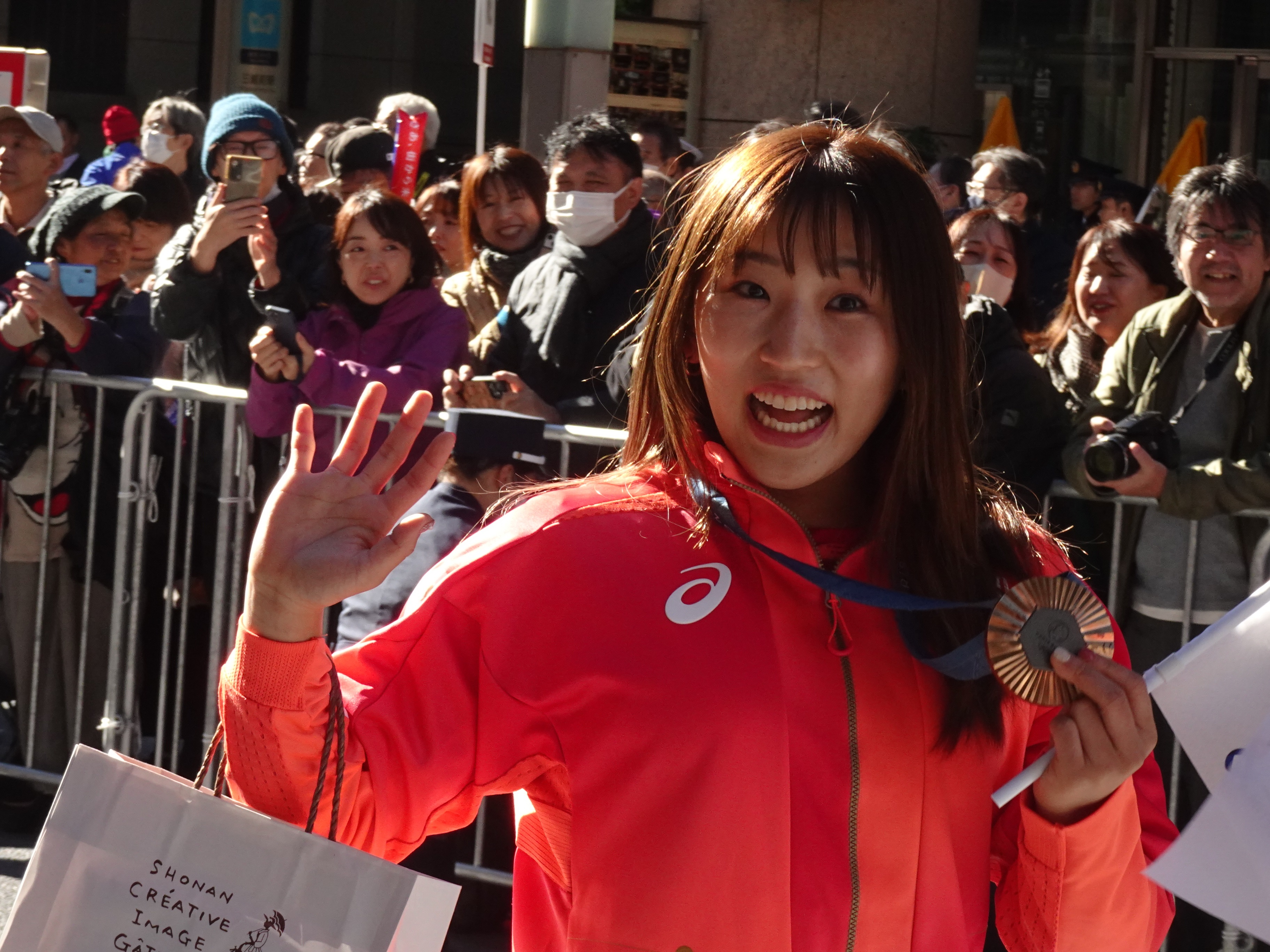
- Susaki at Paris 2024 Summer Olympians and Paralympians Japan National Team parade event on November 30, 2024

Personal information
- Native name: 須崎優衣
- Born: 30 June 1999 (age 27) Matsudo, Chiba Prefecture, Japan
- Height: 153 cm (5 ft 0 in)
- Weight: 50 kg (110 lb)

Sport
- Country: Japan
- Sport: Wrestling
- Event: Freestyle
- College team: Waseda University
- Club: Waseda University club
- Coached by: Shoko Yoshimura
Medal record
Women's freestyle wrestling
Representing Japan
Event	1st	2nd	3rd
Olympic Games	1	-	1
World Championships	5	-	-
Asian Championships	2	-	-
World U23 Championships	1	-	-
World Junior Championships	2	-	-
World Cadet Championships	3	-	-
Total	14	0	1
Olympic Games
Gold medal – first place	2020 Tokyo	50 kg
Bronze medal – third place	2024 Paris	50 kg
World Championships
Gold medal – first place	2017 Paris	48 kg
Gold medal – first place	2018 Budapest	50 kg
Gold medal – first place	2022 Belgrade	50 kg
Gold medal – first place	2023 Belgrade	50 kg
Gold medal – first place	2026 Astana	50 kg
Asian Championships
Gold medal – first place	2017 New Delhi	48 kg
Gold medal – first place	2024 Bishkek	50 kg
Gold medal – first place	2026 Bishkek	50 kg
Golden Grand Prix Ivan Yarygin
Gold medal – first place	2017 Krasnoyarsk	48 kg
World U23 Championships
Gold medal – first place	2022 Pontevedra	50 kg
World Juniors Championships
Gold medal – first place	2018 Trnava	50 kg
Gold medal – first place	2019 Tallinn	50 kg
World Cadets Championships
Gold medal – first place	2014 Snina	43 kg
Gold medal – first place	2015 Sarajevo	46 kg
Gold medal – first place	2016 Tbilisi	49 kg

Yui Susaki (須崎 優衣, Susaki Yui; born 30 June 1999) is a Japanese freestyle wrestler. She won the gold medal in the women's 50 kg event at the 2020 Summer Olympics without conceding a single point to any opponent. In the 2024 Summer Olympics, she was defeated by Vinesh Phogat, her first ever loss in any international bout. She eventually won a bronze medal through the repechage bout. She is also a five-time World Champion, having won her first title in 2017. She is coached by Shoko Yoshimura.

== Career ==
Susaki made her junior debut in 2010 and won three consecutive world cadet championships from 2014 to 2016. In 2017, she won the gold medal at her debut World Championships in Paris in 2017 in the 48 kg category. In 2018, she won the gold medal at the 2018 World Wrestling Championships at Budapest in the new 50 kg category. Between the world titles, she won the Golden Grand Prix Ivan Yarygin 2017 and the Klippan Lady Open in 2018 in the women's 50 kg event. In Klippan, she beat then top ranked Mariya Stadnik in the final by a 10-1 scoreline.

She could not defend her World title in the 2019 World Wrestling Championships, as she was beaten in the national trials by Yuki Irie, who then represented Japan at the Championships. However, after Irie's subsequent poor performance, Susaki was recalled to the Olympic Team. On 5 July 2021, she was named flagbearer of the Japanese delegation to the Summer Olympics by the Japanese Olympic Committee, together with basketball player Rui Hachimura. Although widely regarded as one of the best wrestlers in the 50 kg class, she was unseeded going into the Olympics. She went on to win the gold medal without conceding a point to an opponent in the Games. She won the gold medal in the women's 50 kg event at the subsequent 2022 World Wrestling Championships held in Belgrade, Serbia. In October, by winning gold at the 2022 U23 World Wrestling Championships, Susaki became the first wrestler to win all four age-group and senior World Wrestling Championships and an Olympic gold medal, completing what has been described as a "Grand Slam" or "Golden Grand Slam".

At the 50 kg event at the 2024 Olympics, Susaki lost her first round bout against Indian wrestler Vinesh Phogat, which was her first loss in 95 matches against non-Japanese wrestlers, and ended her perfect 82–0 record at the international level. In the repechage bout, she overcame Ukrainian Oksana Livach by technical superiority to win the bronze medal.

== Awards ==
- Wrestling Special Award by Tokyo Sports (2017)

== Achievements ==
Legend

- W – Win; L – Loss;
- F – Victory by fall

=== Summer Olympic Games ===
Year	Venue	Event	Opponent	Result	Round	Rank
2020	Tokyo	50 kg	Sun Yanan (CHN)	W 10–0	Final	Gold
2024	Paris	50 kg	Oksana Livach (UKR)	W 10-0	Repechage	Bronze

=== World Championships ===
Year	Venue	Event	Opponent	Result	Round	Rank
2017	Paris	48 kg	Alina Vuc (ROU)	W 14-4	Final	Gold
2018	Budapest	50 kg	Mariya Stadnik (AZE)	W 10-0	Final	Gold
2022	Belgrade	50 kg	Dolgorjavyn Otgonjargal (MGL)	W 4^{F}-0	Final	Gold
2023	Belgrade	50 kg	Dolgorjavyn Otgonjargal (MGL)	W 10-0	Final	Gold

=== Asian Wrestling Championships ===
Year	Venue	Event	Opponent	Result	Round	Rank
2017	New Delhi	48 kg	Kim Son-hyang (PRK)	W 10-0	Final	Gold
2024	Bishkek	50 kg	Feng Ziqi (CHN)	W 8-4	Final	Gold

Olympic Games
Preceded by Keisuke Ushiro	Flagbearer for Japan (with Rui Hachimura); Tokyo 2020	Succeeded by Misaki Emura; Shigeyuki Nakarai
