= 2021 World Wrestling Championships – Women's freestyle 50 kg =

Wrestling competitions

Women's freestyle 50 kg at the 2021 World Championships
- Venue: Nye Jordal Amfi
- Dates: 5–6 October 2021
- Competitors: 20 from 20 nations

Medalists
gold medal	Remina Yoshimoto	Japan
silver medal	Sarah Hildebrandt	United States
bronze medal	Nadezhda Sokolova	RWF
bronze medal	Dolgorjavyn Otgonjargal	Mongolia

The women's freestyle 50 kilograms is a competition featured at the 2021 World Wrestling Championships, and was held in Oslo, Norway on 5 and 6 October.

This freestyle wrestling competition consists of a single-elimination tournament, with a repechage used to determine the winner of two bronze medals. The two finalists face off for gold and silver medals. Each wrestler who loses to one of the two finalists moves into the repechage, culminating in a pair of bronze medal matches featuring the semifinal losers each facing the remaining repechage opponent from their half of the bracket.

== Results ==
Legend

- F — Won by fall

=== Final ===
Final
Sarah Hildebrandt (USA)	3
Remina Yoshimoto (JPN)	5

=== Top half ===
Round of 32

Round of 16
Sarah Hildebrandt (USA)	10
Bohdana Kokozei (UKR)	0
Emilia Cîrîcu (MDA)	2
Lisa Ersel (GER)	3
Cheon Mi-ran (KOR)	2
Hanny Kumari (IND)	9
Nadezhda Sokolova (RWF)	12
Patricia Bermúdez (ARG)	0

Quarterfinals
Sarah Hildebrandt (USA)	10
Lisa Ersel (GER)	0
Hanny Kumari (IND)	0
Nadezhda Sokolova (RWF)	10

Semifinals
Sarah Hildebrandt (USA)	12
Nadezhda Sokolova (RWF)	1

=== Bottom half ===
Round of 32
Miglena Selishka (BUL)	7
Anna Łukasiak (POL)	2
Turkan Nasirova (AZE)	2
Natallia Varakina (BLR)	3
Gabija Dilytė (LTU)	0
Remina Yoshimoto (JPN)	10
Evin Demirhan (TUR)	2
Dolgorjavyn Otgonjargal (MGL)	11

Round of 16
Alina Vuc (ROU)	8
Ramona Eriksen (NOR)	4
Madison Parks (CAN)	2^{F}
Miglena Selishka (BUL)	4
Natallia Varakina (BLR)	0
Remina Yoshimoto (JPN)	10
Dolgorjavyn Otgonjargal (MGL)	10^{F}
Kamila Barbosa (BRA)	2

Quarterfinals
Alina Vuc (ROU)	15
Madison Parks (CAN)	3
Remina Yoshimoto (JPN)	4^{F}
Dolgorjavyn Otgonjargal (MGL)	0

Semifinals
Alina Vuc (ROU)	0
Remina Yoshimoto (JPN)	11

=== Repechage ===
Repechage round 1
Gabija Dilytė (LTU)	0
Natallia Varakina (BLR)	7

Repechage round 2
Bohdana Kokozei (UKR)	6^{F}
Lisa Ersel (GER)	2
Natallia Varakina (BLR)	0
Dolgorjavyn Otgonjargal (MGL)	4^{F}

Bronze medals
Bohdana Kokozei (UKR)	2
Nadezhda Sokolova (RWF)	12
Dolgorjavyn Otgonjargal (MGL)	10
Alina Vuc (ROU)	0

== Final standing ==
Rank	Athlete
1st place, gold medalist(s)	Remina Yoshimoto (JPN)
2nd place, silver medalist(s)	Sarah Hildebrandt (USA)
3rd place, bronze medalist(s)	Nadezhda Sokolova (RWF)
3rd place, bronze medalist(s)	Dolgorjavyn Otgonjargal (MGL)
5	Bohdana Kokozei (UKR)
5	Alina Vuc (ROU)
7	Madison Parks (CAN)
8	Natallia Varakina (BLR)
9	Miglena Selishka (BUL)
10	Hanny Kumari (IND)
11	Lisa Ersel (GER)
12	Ramona Eriksen (NOR)
13	Emilia Cîrîcu (MDA)
14	Turkan Nasirova (AZE)
15	Anna Łukasiak (POL)
16	Cheon Mi-ran (KOR)
17	Evin Demirhan (TUR)
18	Kamila Barbosa (BRA)
19	Patricia Bermúdez (ARG)
20	Gabija Dilytė (LTU)
