= Alisson Cardozo =

Colombian freestyle wrestler (born 1998)

Personal information
- Full name: Alisson Camila Cardozo Rey
- Nationality: Colombian
- Born: 15 May 1998 (age 28) Bogotá, Colombia
- Height: 149 cm (4 ft 11 in)
- Weight: 43 kg; 48 kg; 50 kg

Sport
- Sport: Amateur wrestling
- Events: Beach wrestling; Freestyle wrestling
Medal record
Representing Colombia
Event	1st	2nd	3rd
CAC Games	0	0	1
Bolivarian Games	0	0	1
South American Beach Games	0	1	0
U20 Pan American Championships	0	0	1
U17 Pan American Championships	0	1	0
Total	0	2	3
Women's freestyle wrestling
Central American and Caribbean Games
Bronze medal – third place	2023 San Salvador	50 kg
Bolivarian Games
Bronze medal – third place	2017 Santa Marta	48 kg
U20 Pan American Championships
Bronze medal – third place	2017 Lima	48 kg
U17 Pan American Championships
Silver medal – second place	2013 Medellín	43 kg
Women's beach wrestling
South American Beach Games
Silver medal – second place	2023 Santa Marta	50 kg

Alisson Camila Cardozo Rey (Note: In this Spanish name, the first or paternal surname is Cardozo and the second or maternal family name is Rey.) (born 15 May 1998) is a Colombian freestyle wrestler.

== Career ==
Alisson Cardozo competed at the 2024 Summer Olympics in Paris, finishing 12th in the women's 50 kg division. Cardozo placed fifth at the 2023 World Wrestling Championships in the same weight.

She is a bronze medalist of the 2017 Bolivarian Games and the 2023 Central American and Caribbean Games. Cardozo won a bronze medal at the 2017 Pan American Junior Championships and was Pan American cadet runner-up in 2013.

== Achievements ==
Year	Tournament	Location	Result	Event
Representing Colombia
2013	U17 Pan American Championships	Medellín, Colombia	2nd	Freestyle 43 kg
2017	U20 Pan American Championships	Lima, Peru	3rd	Freestyle 48 kg
2017	Bolivarian Games	Santa Marta, Colombia	3rd	Freestyle 48 kg
2023	Central American and Caribbean Games	San Salvador, El Salvador	3rd	Freestyle 50 kg
2023	South American Beach Games	Santa Marta, Colombia	2nd	Beach wrestling 50 kg
