= Qiandegenchagan =

Chinese freestyle wrestler

Personal information
- Native name: 钱德根查干
- Born: 20 July 1994 (age 32) Xilingol League, Inner Mongolia, China

Sport
- Country: China
- Sport: Amateur wrestling
- Weight class: 72 kg
- Event: Freestyle
Medal record
Women's freestyle wrestling
Representing China
Asian Championships
Bronze medal – third place	2016 Bangkok	75 kg

Qiandegenchagan (also called Qiandegen Chagan; born 20 July 1994) is a Chinese freestyle wrestler of Mongol ethnicity. She won a bronze medal in the 75 kg event at the 2016 Asian Wrestling Championships.

== Background ==
Qiandegenchagan was born to a wrestling family in 1995 in Xilingol League of Inner Mongolia. She joined the Inner Mongolia provincial wrestling team in 2009. She is of Mongol ethnicity.
