= 2023 World Wrestling Championships =

Wrestling tournament in Belgrade, Serbia

- Host city: Belgrade, Serbia
- Dates: 16–24 September 2023
- Stadium: Štark Arena

Champions
- Freestyle: United States
- Greco-Roman: Azerbaijan
- Women: Japan

The 2023 World Wrestling Championships was held from 16 to 24 September 2023 in Belgrade, Serbia. Wrestlers get a chance to win 90 quotas for the 2024 Summer Olympics from the Belgrade Worlds. Any nation that participated in the 2023 continental championships was eligible to participate in the World Championships.

== Medal table ==
Rank	Nation	Gold	Silver	Bronze	Total
1	Japan	6	3	3	12
2	United States	4	3	7	14
3	Kyrgyzstan	3	1	1	5
4	Azerbaijan	2	5	0	7
5	Iran	2	3	4	9
–	Individual Neutral Athletes	2	2	2	6
6	Turkey	2	1	4	7
7	Hungary	2	1	0	3
8	Cuba	2	0	1	3
9	Georgia	1	3	2	6
10	Serbia	1	0	4	5
11	China	1	0	3	4
12	Kazakhstan	1	0	2	3
13	France	1	0	1	2
14	Bahrain	1	0	0	1
15	Mongolia	0	3	0	3
16	Armenia	0	1	4	5
16	Ukraine	0	1	4	5
18	Moldova	0	1	2	3
19	Puerto Rico	0	1	0	1
20	Bulgaria	0	0	3	3
21	Norway	0	0	2	2
21	Uzbekistan	0	0	2	2
23	Albania	0	0	1	1
23	Colombia	0	0	1	1
23	Czech Republic	0	0	1	1
23	Ecuador	0	0	1	1
23	Egypt	0	0	1	1
23	Germany	0	0	1	1
23	Nigeria	0	0	1	1
23	San Marino	0	0	1	1
23	United World Wrestling	0	0	1	1
Totals (31 entries)		31	29	60	120

== Team ranking ==
Rank	Men's freestyle		Men's Greco-Roman		Women's freestyle	
Rank	Team	Points	Team	Points	Team	Points
1	United States	148	Azerbaijan	120	Japan	195
2	Iran	110	Iran	102	United States	135
3	Georgia	80	Turkey	93	Mongolia	80
4	Kazakhstan	74	Cuba	73	China	65
5	Azerbaijan	66	Armenia	65	Ukraine	59
6	Japan	61	Kyrgyzstan	60	Moldova	58
7	Armenia	49	Georgia	59	Turkey	55
8	Turkey	42	Hungary	57	Kyrgyzstan	47
9	Serbia	40	Uzbekistan	52	United World Wrestling	39
10	Hungary	37	Serbia	49	Germany	35

== Medal summary ==
=== Men's freestyle ===
Event	Gold	Silver	Bronze
57 kg	Stevan Mićić; Serbia	Rei Higuchi; Japan	Arsen Harutyunyan; Armenia
57 kg	Stevan Mićić; Serbia	Rei Higuchi; Japan	Zelimkhan Abakarov; Albania
61 kg	Vito Arujau; United States	Abasgadzhi Magomedov; Individual Neutral Athletes	Taiyrbek Zhumashbek Uulu; Kyrgyzstan
61 kg	Vito Arujau; United States	Abasgadzhi Magomedov; Individual Neutral Athletes	Shota Phartenadze; Georgia
65 kg	Iszmail Muszukajev; Hungary	Sebastian Rivera; Puerto Rico	Shamil Mamedov; Individual Neutral Athletes
65 kg	Iszmail Muszukajev; Hungary	Sebastian Rivera; Puerto Rico	Vazgen Tevanyan; Armenia
70 kg	Zain Retherford; United States	Amir Mohammad Yazdani; Iran	Ramazan Ramazanov; Bulgaria
70 kg	Zain Retherford; United States	Amir Mohammad Yazdani; Iran	Arman Andreasyan; Armenia
74 kg	Zaurbek Sidakov; Individual Neutral Athletes	Kyle Dake; United States	Khetag Tsabolov; Serbia
74 kg	Zaurbek Sidakov; Individual Neutral Athletes	Kyle Dake; United States	Daichi Takatani; Japan
79 kg	Akhmed Usmanov; Individual Neutral Athletes	Vladimeri Gamkrelidze; Georgia	Mohammad Nokhodi; Iran
79 kg	Akhmed Usmanov; Individual Neutral Athletes	Vladimeri Gamkrelidze; Georgia	Vasyl Mykhailov; Ukraine
86 kg	David Taylor; United States	Hassan Yazdani; Iran	Myles Amine; San Marino
86 kg	David Taylor; United States	Hassan Yazdani; Iran	Azamat Dauletbekov; Kazakhstan
92 kg	Rizabek Aitmukhan; Kazakhstan	Osman Nurmagomedov; Azerbaijan	Feyzullah Aktürk; Turkey
92 kg	Rizabek Aitmukhan; Kazakhstan	Osman Nurmagomedov; Azerbaijan	Zahid Valencia; United States
97 kg	Akhmed Tazhudinov; Bahrain	Magomedkhan Magomedov; Azerbaijan	Kyle Snyder; United States
97 kg	Akhmed Tazhudinov; Bahrain	Magomedkhan Magomedov; Azerbaijan	Givi Matcharashvili; Georgia
125 kg	Amir Hossein Zare; Iran	Geno Petriashvili; Georgia	Taha Akgül; Turkey
125 kg	Amir Hossein Zare; Iran	Geno Petriashvili; Georgia	Mason Parris; United States

=== Men's Greco-Roman ===
Event	Gold	Silver	Bronze
55 kg	Eldaniz Azizli; Azerbaijan	Nugzari Tsurtsumia; Georgia	Pouya Dadmarz; Iran
55 kg	Eldaniz Azizli; Azerbaijan	Nugzari Tsurtsumia; Georgia	Jasurbek Ortikboev; Uzbekistan
60 kg	Zholaman Sharshenbekov; Kyrgyzstan	Kenichiro Fumita; Japan	Cao Liguo; China
60 kg	Zholaman Sharshenbekov; Kyrgyzstan	Kenichiro Fumita; Japan	Islomjon Bakhromov; Uzbekistan
63 kg	Leri Abuladze; Georgia	Murad Mammadov; Azerbaijan	Enes Başar; Turkey
63 kg	Leri Abuladze; Georgia	Murad Mammadov; Azerbaijan	Georgii Tibilov; Serbia
67 kg	Luis Orta; Cuba	Hasrat Jafarov; Azerbaijan	Mate Nemeš; Serbia
67 kg	Luis Orta; Cuba	Hasrat Jafarov; Azerbaijan	Mohammad Reza Geraei; Iran
72 kg	Ibrahim Ghanem; France	Róbert Fritsch; Hungary	Selçuk Can; Turkey
72 kg	Ibrahim Ghanem; France	Róbert Fritsch; Hungary	Ali Arsalan; Serbia
77 kg	Akzhol Makhmudov; Kyrgyzstan	Sanan Suleymanov; Azerbaijan	Malkhas Amoyan; Armenia
77 kg	Akzhol Makhmudov; Kyrgyzstan	Sanan Suleymanov; Azerbaijan	Nao Kusaka; Japan
82 kg	Rafig Huseynov; Azerbaijan	Alireza Mohmadi; Iran	Aues Gonibov; Individual Neutral Athletes
82 kg	Rafig Huseynov; Azerbaijan	Alireza Mohmadi; Iran	Yaroslav Filchakov; Ukraine
87 kg	Ali Cengiz; Turkey	Shared gold	Zhan Beleniuk; Ukraine
87 kg	Dávid Losonczi; Hungary	Shared gold	Semen Novikov; Bulgaria
97 kg	Gabriel Rosillo; Cuba	Artur Aleksanyan; Armenia	Artur Omarov; Czech Republic
97 kg	Gabriel Rosillo; Cuba	Artur Aleksanyan; Armenia	Mohammad Hadi Saravi; Iran
130 kg	Amin Mirzazadeh; Iran	Rıza Kayaalp; Turkey	Abdellatif Mohamed; Egypt
130 kg	Amin Mirzazadeh; Iran	Rıza Kayaalp; Turkey	Óscar Pino; Cuba

=== Women's freestyle ===
Event	Gold	Silver	Bronze
50 kg	Yui Susaki; Japan	Dolgorjavyn Otgonjargal; Mongolia	Feng Ziqi; China
50 kg	Yui Susaki; Japan	Dolgorjavyn Otgonjargal; Mongolia	Sarah Hildebrandt; United States
53 kg	Akari Fujinami; Japan	Vanesa Kaladzinskaya; Individual Neutral Athletes	Lucía Yépez; Ecuador
53 kg	Akari Fujinami; Japan	Vanesa Kaladzinskaya; Individual Neutral Athletes	Antim Panghal; United World Wrestling
55 kg	Haruna Okuno; Japan	Jacarra Winchester; United States	Mariana Drăguțan; Moldova
55 kg	Haruna Okuno; Japan	Jacarra Winchester; United States	Anastasia Blayvas; Germany
57 kg	Tsugumi Sakurai; Japan	Anastasia Nichita; Moldova	Odunayo Adekuoroye; Nigeria
57 kg	Tsugumi Sakurai; Japan	Anastasia Nichita; Moldova	Helen Maroulis; United States
59 kg	Zhang Qi; China	Yuliya Tkach; Ukraine	Jennifer Rogers; United States
59 kg	Zhang Qi; China	Yuliya Tkach; Ukraine	Othelie Høie; Norway
62 kg	Aisuluu Tynybekova; Kyrgyzstan	Sakura Motoki; Japan	Grace Bullen; Norway
62 kg	Aisuluu Tynybekova; Kyrgyzstan	Sakura Motoki; Japan	Iryna Koliadenko; Ukraine
65 kg	Nonoka Ozaki; Japan	Macey Kilty; United States	Mimi Hristova; Bulgaria
65 kg	Nonoka Ozaki; Japan	Macey Kilty; United States	Lili; China
68 kg	Buse Tosun Çavuşoğlu; Turkey	Enkhsaikhany Delgermaa; Mongolia	Koumba Larroque; France
68 kg	Buse Tosun Çavuşoğlu; Turkey	Enkhsaikhany Delgermaa; Mongolia	Irina Rîngaci; Moldova
72 kg	Amit Elor; United States	Enkh-Amaryn Davaanasan; Mongolia	Zhamila Bakbergenova; Kazakhstan
72 kg	Amit Elor; United States	Enkh-Amaryn Davaanasan; Mongolia	Miwa Morikawa; Japan
76 kg	Yuka Kagami; Japan	Aiperi Medet Kyzy; Kyrgyzstan	Tatiana Rentería; Colombia
76 kg	Yuka Kagami; Japan	Aiperi Medet Kyzy; Kyrgyzstan	Adeline Gray; United States

== Paris 2024 qualification ==
NOC	Men's freestyle						Men's Greco-Roman						Women's freestyle						Total
NOC	57	65	74	86	97	125	60	67	77	87	97	130	50	53	57	62	68	76	Total
Albania	Yes																		1
Armenia	Yes	Yes						Yes	Yes		Yes								5
Azerbaijan					Yes			Yes	Yes										3
Bahrain					Yes														1
Bulgaria										Yes									1
China							Yes					Yes	Yes						3
Colombia																		Yes	1
Cuba								Yes			Yes	Yes						Yes	4
Czech Republic											Yes								1
Ecuador														Yes					1
Egypt												Yes							1
France																	Yes		1
Georgia					Yes	Yes													2
Germany																Yes			1
Greece			Yes																1
Hungary		Yes								Yes									2
India														Yes					1
Individual Neutral Athletes	Yes	Yes	Yes			Yes					Yes			Yes					6
Iran		Yes		Yes		Yes	Yes	Yes			Yes	Yes							7
Japan	Yes		Yes				Yes		Yes				Yes	Yes	Yes	Yes	Yes	Yes	10
Kazakhstan				Yes						Yes									2
Kyrgyzstan							Yes		Yes							Yes		Yes	4
Moldova															Yes		Yes		2
Mongolia													Yes				Yes		2
Nigeria															Yes				1
Norway																Yes			1
Poland															Yes				1
Puerto Rico		Yes																	1
San Marino				Yes															1
Serbia	Yes		Yes					Yes											3
Sweden														Yes					1
Turkey					Yes	Yes				Yes		Yes	Yes				Yes		6
Ukraine										Yes						Yes			2
United States			Yes	Yes	Yes	Yes							Yes		Yes			Yes	7
Uzbekistan				Yes			Yes		Yes										3
Total: 35 NOCs	5	5	5	5	5	5	5	5	5	5	5	5	5	5	5	5	5	5	90

== Participating nations ==
940 competitors from 88 nations and 2 other teams participated.

- Albania (6)
- Algeria (8)
- Angola (1)
- Argentina (2)
- Armenia (17)
- Australia (3)
- Austria (7)
- Azerbaijan (26)
- Bahrain (4)
- Barbados (1)
- Belgium (1)
- Brazil (9)
- Bulgaria (22)
- Cambodia (1)
- Canada (19)
- Cape Verde (3)
- Chile (2)
- China (29)
- Colombia (12)
- Comoros (2)
- Costa Rica (1)
- Croatia (6)
- Cuba (11)
- Czech Republic (4)
- Denmark (2)
- Ecuador (7)
- Egypt (11)
- El Salvador (1)
- Estonia (7)
- Federated States of Micronesia (1)
- Finland (5)
- France (14)
- Georgia (20)
- Germany (22)
- Greece (5)
- Guam (5)
- Guinea-Bissau (1)
- Honduras (1)
- Hungary (22)
- Individual Neutral Athletes (56)
- Iran (20)
- Israel (8)
- Italy (17)
- Ivory Coast (2)
- Jamaica (1)
- Japan (30)
- Jordan (2)
- Kazakhstan (29)
- Kenya (13)
- Kyrgyzstan (19)
- Latvia (4)
- Lithuania (13)
- Mexico (19)
- Moldova (20)
- Mongolia (20)
- Morocco (2)
- Netherlands (2)
- Nigeria (6)
- Norway (8)
- North Macedonia (8)
- Pakistan (3)
- Palestine (1)
- Peru (2)
- Poland (22)
- Puerto Rico (7)
- Romania (16)
- San Marino (2)
- Serbia (17)
- Sierra Leone (1)
- Slovakia (5)
- South Africa (1)
- South Korea (26)
- Spain (9)
- Sri Lanka (2)
- Sudan (1)
- Sweden (10)
- Switzerland (9)
- Tajikistan (6)
- Tonga (1)
- Tunisia (3)
- Turkey (30)
- Turkmenistan (12)
- Uganda (2)
- Ukraine (30)
- United States (30)
- United World Wrestling (32)
- Uzbekistan (26)
- Venezuela (10)
- Vietnam (3)
- Yemen (1)
- As a result of sanctions imposed following the 2022 Russian invasion of Ukraine, wrestlers from Russia and Belarus were not permitted to use the name, flag, or anthem of Russia or Belarus. They instead participated as Individual Neutral Athletes (Athlètes Individuels Neutres in French) according to an IOC decision implemented by the UWW. No flags at all were used for these delegations, not even the UWW flag. The UWW does not include the medals won by these wrestlers in the official medal table, their results were not counted in the team rankings.
- As a result of sanctions by the UWW imposed on the Wrestling Federation of India for not conducting its elections on time, wrestlers from India were not permitted to use the name, flag, or anthem of India. They instead participated under the name and the flag of the United World Wrestling (UWW). Beside that two refugee wrestlers also participated also as part of the team.

== Controversies ==
United World Wrestling (UWW) authorized some Russian wrestlers to participate in the World Championships though they had participated in the pro-war rally and expressed their support for the Russo-Ukrainian war. The athletes in question included Abdulrashid Sadulaev, Zaurbek Sidakov, and Zaur Uguev. This decision contradicted the IOC's recommendations. UWW explained its decision to clear them for the World Championships by stating that their participation in certain events was not of their own will and their support for the war and the policy of their government could not be certainly concluded. In general, Individual Neutral Athletes won 2 gold, 2 silver and 2 bronze medals: athletes from Russia (Aues Gonibov, Abasgadzhi Magomedov, Shamil Mamedov, Zaurbek Sidakov and Akhmed Usmanov) won 2 gold, 1 silver and 2 bronze medals while athletes from Belarus (Vanesa Kaladzinskaya) – 1 silver medal.
