= Sarah Hildebrandt =

American freestyle wrestler (born 1993)

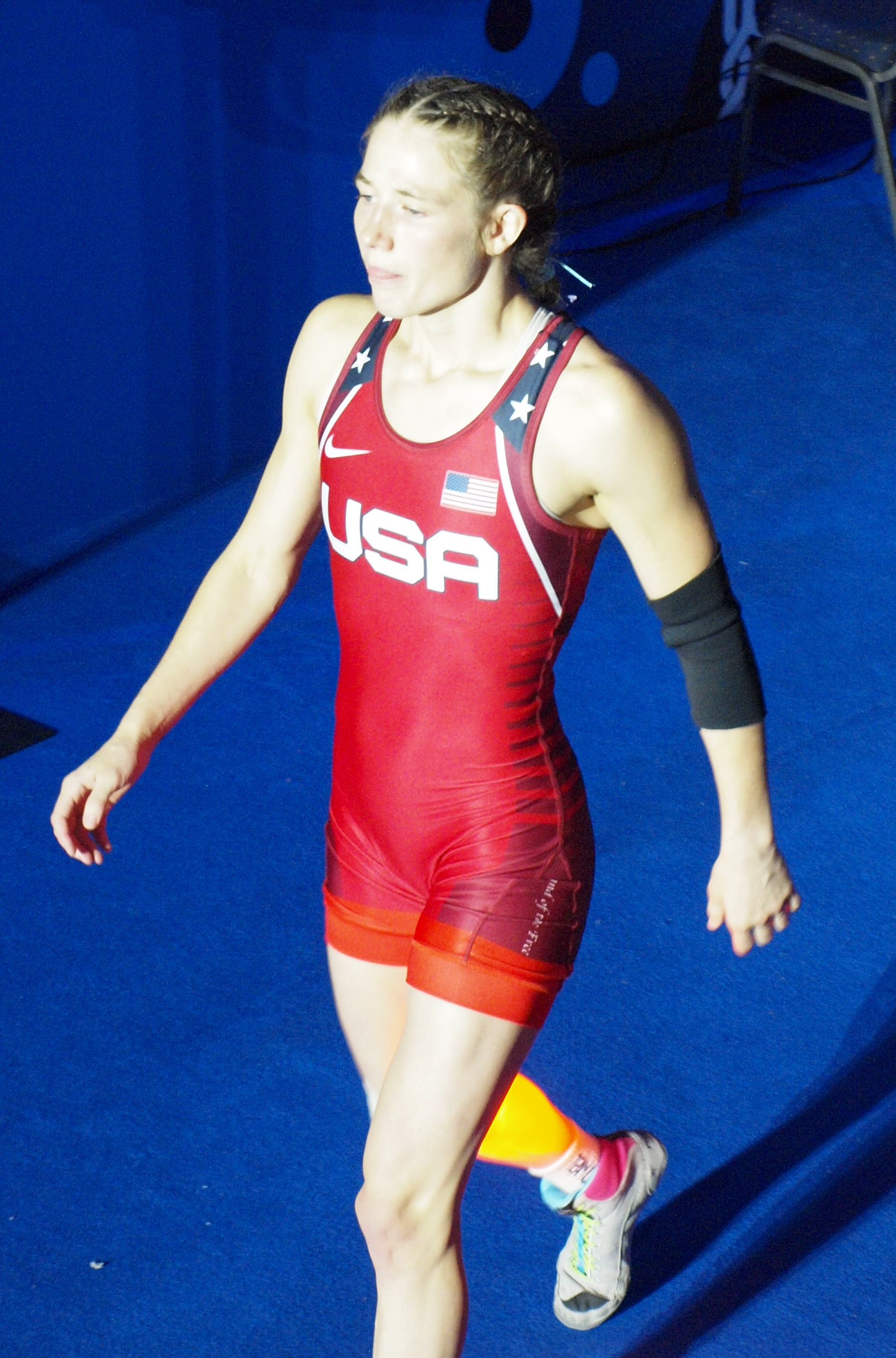
- Hildebrandt at the 2021 World Wrestling Championships in Oslo, Norway

Personal information
- Full name: Sarah Ann Hildebrandt
- Born: September 23, 1993 (age 32) Granger, Indiana, U.S.
- Education: King University
- Height: 5 ft 3 in (160 cm)

Sport
- Country: United States
- Sport: Wrestling
- Weight class: 50 kg; 53 kg; 55 kg
- Event: Freestyle
- Club: New York Athletic Club
- Coached by: Terry Steiner
Medal record
Women's freestyle wrestling
Representing the United States
Olympic Games
Gold medal – first place	2024 Paris	50 kg
Bronze medal – third place	2020 Tokyo	50 kg
World Championships
Silver medal – second place	2018 Budapest	53 kg
Silver medal – second place	2021 Oslo	50 kg
Bronze medal – third place	2022 Belgrade	50 kg
Bronze medal – third place	2023 Belgrade	50 kg
Pan American Games
Gold medal – first place	2019 Lima	53 kg
Pan American Championships
Gold medal – first place	2013 Panama City	55 kg
Gold medal – first place	2015 Santiago	55 kg
Gold medal – first place	2018 Lima	53 kg
Gold medal – first place	2019 Buenos Aires	53 kg
Gold medal – first place	2021 Guatemala City	50 kg
Gold medal – first place	2022 Acapulco	50 kg
Gold medal – first place	2023 Buenos Aires	50 kg
Golden Grand Prix Ivan Yarygin
Gold medal – first place	2019 Krasnoyarsk	53 kg
Silver medal – second place	2017 Krasnoyarsk	55 kg

Sarah Ann Hildebrandt (/ˈhɪldəbrænt/ HIL-də-brant; born September 23, 1993) is an American freestyle wrestler. She currently competes in the Strawweight division of Real American Freestyle (RAF), where she was the former RAF Women's Strawweight Champion.

Hildebrandt won the gold medal in the women's 50 kg event at the 2024 Summer Olympics in Paris, France, and a bronze at the 2020 Summer Olympics in Tokyo, Japan. She is a four-time medalist at the World Wrestling Championships and a gold medalist at the Pan American Games. Hildebrandt is also a seven-time gold medalist at the Pan American Wrestling Championships.

== Career ==
In 2013, Hildebrandt represented the United States at the Summer Universiade in Kazan, Russia without winning a medal. In 2016, she competed in the 55 kg event at the World Wrestling Championships in Budapest, Hungary without winning a medal. She lost her first match against Mayu Mukaida of Japan and she entered the repechage where she lost her match against Ramóna Galambos of Hungary. In 2017, at the Golden Grand Prix Ivan Yarygin 2017 held in Krasnoyarsk, Russia, she won the silver medal in the women's 55 kg event.

In 2018, Hildebrandt won one of the bronze medals in the women's 53 kg event at the Klippan Lady Open in Klippan, Sweden. She also competed in the women's freestyle competition of the 2018 Wrestling World Cup. At the 2018 Pan American Wrestling Championships held in Lima, Peru, she won the gold medal in the women's 53 kg event. In the final, she defeated Luisa Valverde of Ecuador. At the 2018 World Wrestling Championships held in Budapest, Hungary, she won the silver medal in the women's 53 kg event.

In 2019, at the Golden Grand Prix Ivan Yarygin held in Krasnoyarsk, Russia, she won the gold medal in the women's 53 kg event. At the 2019 Pan American Wrestling Championships held in Buenos Aires, Argentina, she won the gold medal in the same event. In June 2019, she won against Katherine Shai at the Final X: Lincoln event held in Lincoln, Nebraska. Later that year, she won the gold medal in the women's 53 kg event at the 2019 Pan American Games held in Lima, Peru. In the final, she defeated Betzabeth Argüello of Venezuela. In the same year, she also competed in the women's freestyle competition of the 2019 Wrestling World Cup.

In 2021, Hildebrandt won the gold medal in the women's 50 kg event at the Grand Prix de France Henri Deglane 2021 held in Nice, France. She also won the gold medal in this event at the Pan American Wrestling Championships held in Guatemala City, Guatemala.

At the 2020 Pan American Wrestling Olympic Qualification Tournament held in March 2020, she earned a quota place for the United States, and in April 2021 at the U.S. Team Trials, she secured her place to compete at the 2020 Summer Olympics in Tokyo, Japan. She lost her semi-final in a close match after leading 7–2 mid-way through her bout and 7–6 with only 12 seconds to go, but her opponent Sun Yanan of China won a 4-point throw at the death and Hildebrandt lost. In her bronze medal match she defeated Oksana Livach of Ukraine.

Two months after the Olympics, Hildebrandt won the silver medal in the women's 50 kg event at the 2021 World Wrestling Championships held in Oslo, Norway. She won the gold medal in her event at the 2022 Pan American Wrestling Championships held in Acapulco, Mexico. She also won the gold medal in her event at the 2022 Tunis Ranking Series event held in Tunis, Tunisia.

Hildebrandt won one of the bronze medals in the women's 50 kg event at the 2022 World Wrestling Championships held in Belgrade, Serbia. She defeated Alina Vuc of Romania in her bronze medal match.

In 2023, Hildebrandt won the gold medal in her event at the Pan American Wrestling Championships held in Buenos Aires, Argentina. She won one of the bronze medals in the women's 50 kg event at the 2023 World Wrestling Championships held in Belgrade, Serbia. As a result, Hildebrandt earned a quota place for the United States for the 2024 Summer Olympics in Paris, France. She qualified for the Olympics at the 2024 United States Olympic trials held in State College, Pennsylvania.

Hildebrandt won the gold medal in the women's 50 kg event at the 2024 Olympics. She defeated Yusneylys Guzmán of Cuba in the gold medal match. Vinesh Phogat of India initially qualified for the final but was disqualified for being above the stipulated weight.

Hildebrandt became the inaugural RAF Women's Strawweight Champion after defeating Zeltzin Hernandez at RAF 01 on August 30, 2025.

== Personal life ==
Hildebrandt graduated from King University in 2015.

== Championships and accomplishments ==
Year	Tournament	Location	Result	Event
2013	Pan American Wrestling Championships	Panama City, Panama	1st	Freestyle 55 kg
2015	Pan American Wrestling Championships	Santiago, Chile	1st	Freestyle 55 kg
2018	Pan American Wrestling Championships	Lima, Peru	1st	Freestyle 53 kg
2018	World Championships	Budapest, Hungary	2nd	Freestyle 53 kg
2019	Pan American Wrestling Championships	Buenos Aires, Argentina	1st	Freestyle 53 kg
2019	Pan American Games	Lima, Peru	1st	Freestyle 53 kg
2021	Pan American Wrestling Championships	Guatemala City, Guatemala	1st	Freestyle 50 kg
2021	Summer Olympics	Tokyo, Japan	3rd	Freestyle 50 kg
2021	World Championships	Oslo, Norway	2nd	Freestyle 50 kg
2022	Pan American Wrestling Championships	Acapulco, Mexico	1st	Freestyle 50 kg
2022	World Championships	Belgrade, Serbia	3rd	Freestyle 50 kg
2023	Pan American Wrestling Championships	Buenos Aires, Argentina	1st	Freestyle 50 kg
2023	World Championships	Belgrade, Serbia	3rd	Freestyle 50 kg
2024	Summer Olympics	Paris, France	1st	Freestyle 50 kg
