= Dolgorjavyn Otgonjargal =

Mongolian freestyle wrestler

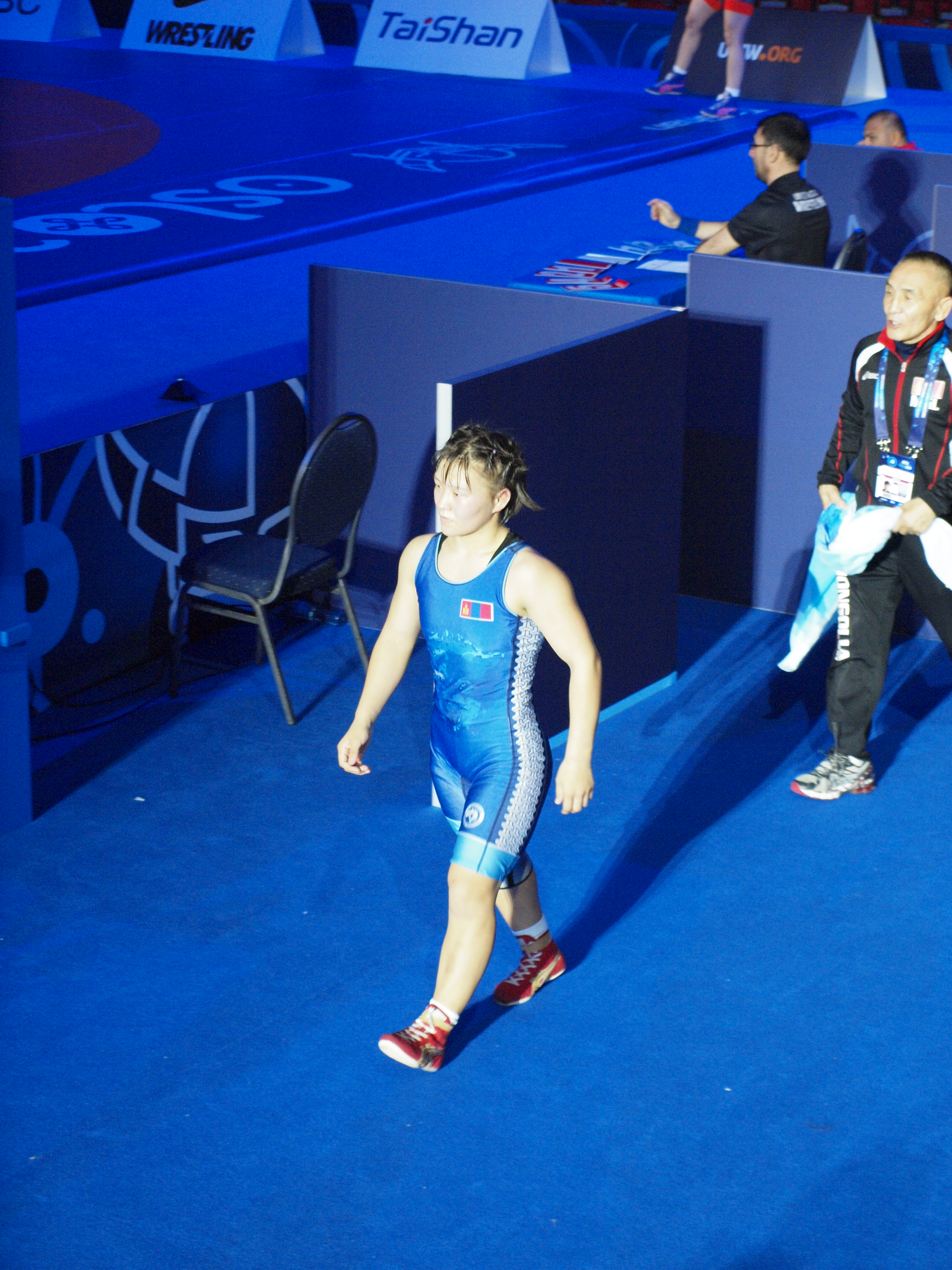
- Dolgorjavyn Otgonjargal at the 2021 World Wrestling Championships in Oslo, Norway

Personal information
- Native name: Долгоржавын Отгонжаргал
- Nationality: Mongolia
- Born: 2 October 2001 (age 24) Ulaanbaatar, Mongolia
- Height: 145 cm (4 ft 9 in)

Sport
- Country: Mongolia
- Sport: Wrestling
- Weight class: 50 kg
- Event: Freestyle

Achievements and titles
- Olympic finals: 5th(2024)
- World finals: (silver) (2022) (silver) (2023)
Medal record
Women's freestyle wrestling
Representing Mongolia
World Championships
Silver medal – second place	2022 Belgrade	50 kg
Silver medal – second place	2023 Belgrade	50 kg
Bronze medal – third place	2021 Oslo	50 kg
World Cup
Bronze medal – third place	2022 Coralville	Team
Golden Grand Prix Ivan Yarygin
Bronze medal – third place	2022 Krasnoyarsk	50 kg
Yasar Dogu Tournament
Bronze medal – third place	2022 Istanbul	50 kg
Bolat Turlykhanov Cup
Bronze medal – third place	2022 Almaty	50 kg
Polyák Imre & Varga János Memorial Tournament
Bronze medal – third place	2023 Budapest	50 kg
World Cadets Championships
Silver medal – second place	2018 Zagreb	46 kg
Asian Cadets Championships
Bronze medal – third place	2018 Tashkent	49 kg

Dolgorjavyn Otgonjargal (Mongolian: Долгоржавын Отгонжаргал), also known as Otgonjargal Dolgorjav, is a Mongolian freestyle wrestler. She won the silver medal in the women's 50 kg event at the 2022 World Wrestling Championships held in Belgrade, Serbia. She won one of the bronze medals in the women's 50 kg event at the 2021 World Wrestling Championships in Oslo, Norway.

In January 2022, she won one of the bronze medals in the women's 50 kg event at the Golden Grand Prix Ivan Yarygin held in Krasnoyarsk, Russia. In February 2022, she also won one of the bronze medals in the women's 50 kg event at the Yasar Dogu Tournament held in Istanbul, Turkey.

She lost her bronze medal match in the women's 50 kg event at the 2024 Summer Olympics in Paris, France.
