= Mercy Genesis =

Nigerian freestyle wrestler

Personal information
- Full name: Miesinnei Mercy Genesis
- Nationality: Nigerian
- Born: 20 September 1997 (age 29)

Sport
- Sport: Freestyle Wrestling
- Event: -48 kg
Medal record
Women's freestyle wrestling
Representing Nigeria
African Championships
Gold medal – first place	2024 Alexandria	50 kg
Gold medal – first place	2025 Casablanca	50 kg
African Games
Gold medal – first place	2015 Brazzaville	48 kg
Gold medal – first place	2023 Accra	50 kg
Islamic Solidarity Games
Silver medal – second place	2025 Riyadh	50 kg
Commonwealth Games
Gold medal – first place	2022 Birmingham	50 kg

Mercy Genesis (born 20 September 1997) is a Nigerian freestyle wrestler. She won the gold medal in the women's 50 kg event at the 2022 Commonwealth Games held in Birmingham, England. At the 2016 Summer Olympics in Rio de Janeiro, Brazil, she competed in the Women's freestyle -48 kg.

In 2019, she won the silver medal in the women's 50 kg beach wrestling event at the 2019 World Beach Games held in Doha, Qatar. She was stripped of her medal in February 2021 due to anti-doping rule violations.

In 2020, she won the gold medal in the women's freestyle 50 kg event at the 2020 African Wrestling Championships.

She competed in the 50 kg event at the 2022 World Wrestling Championships held in Belgrade, Serbia.
