= Feng Ziqi =

Chinese freestyle wrestler

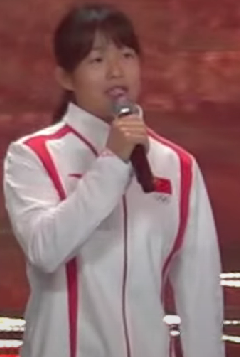
- Feng in 2024

Personal information
- Native name: 冯紫琪
- Born: June 29, 1999 (age 27) Guangzhou, Guangdong, China

Sport
- Country: China
- Sport: Amateur wrestling
- Weight class: 50 kg
- Event: Freestyle
Medal record
Women's freestyle wrestling
Representing China
Olympic Games
Bronze medal – third place	2024 Paris	50 kg
World Championships
Bronze medal – third place	2023 Belgrade	50 kg
Bronze medal – third place	2026 Astana	50 kg
Asian Championships
Silver medal – second place	2024 Bishkek	50 kg
Bronze medal – third place	2023 Astana	50 kg
Bronze medal – third place	2026 Bishkek	50 kg
World U23 Championships
Silver medal – second place	2019 Budapest	50 kg

Feng Ziqi (born June 29, 1999) is a Chinese freestyle wrestler. She won a bronze medal in the 50 kg event at the 2023 World Wrestling Championships held in Belgrade, Serbia, and again the 50 kg event at the 2024 Summer Olympics held in Paris, France.

== Background ==
Feng was born in 1999 and is from Guangzhou in Guangdong province. She started training in wrestling when she was 9. In 2018 she joined the Guangdong provincial wrestling team.

On 31 October 2019, Feng won a silver medal in the 50 kg event at the 2019 U23 World Wrestling Championships.

In 2023, Feng won a bronze medal in the 50 kg event at the 2023 World Wrestling Championships by defeating Alisson Cardozo of Colombia.

In 2024, Feng won another bronze medal at the 50 kg event at the 2024 Summer Olympics by defeating Otgonjargal Dolgorjav of Mongolia.
