= 2020 European Wrestling Championships – Women's freestyle 50 kg =

Competition at the 2020 European Wrestling Championships

The women's freestyle 50 kg is a competition featured at the 2020 European Wrestling Championships, and was held in Rome, Italy on February 12 and February 13.

== Medalists ==
Gold	Miglena Selishka; Bulgaria
Silver	Oksana Livach; Ukraine
Bronze	Kseniya Stankevich; Belarus
Bronze	Milana Dadasheva; Russia

== Results ==
Legend

- F — Won by fall

Round of 16
Alina Vuc (ROU)	4^{F}
Turkan Nasirova (AZE)	0
Aintzane Gorría (ESP)	0
Julie Sabatié (FRA)	6
Evin Demirhan (TUR)	5
Oksana Livach (UKR)	7
Milana Dadasheva (RUS)	4^{F}
Emanuela Liuzzi (ITA)	0
Ramona Eriksen (NOR)	0
Anna Łukasiak (POL)	8^{F}

Quarterfinals
Emilia Cîrîcu (MDA)	0
Miglena Selishka (BUL)	11
Kseniya Stankevich (BLR)	12
Alina Vuc (ROU)	9
Julie Sabatié (FRA)	2
Oksana Livach (UKR)	12
Milana Dadasheva (RUS)	10
Anna Łukasiak (POL)	1

Semifinals
Miglena Selishka (BUL)	10
Kseniya Stankevich (BLR)	6
Oksana Livach (UKR)	9
Milana Dadasheva (RUS)	8

Final
Miglena Selishka (BUL)	5
Oksana Livach (UKR)	3

Repechage round 1
Evin Demirhan (TUR)	9
Julie Sabatié (FRA)	0

Bronze medal match
Emilia Cîrîcu (MDA)	0
Kseniya Stankevich (BLR)	10
Evin Demirhan (TUR)	4
Milana Dadasheva (RUS)	10

== Final standing ==
Rank	Athlete
1st place, gold medalist(s)	Miglena Selishka (BUL)
2nd place, silver medalist(s)	Oksana Livach (UKR)
3rd place, bronze medalist(s)	Kseniya Stankevich (BLR)
3rd place, bronze medalist(s)	Milana Dadasheva (RUS)
5	Emilia Cîrîcu (MDA)
5	Evin Demirhan (TUR)
7	Alina Vuc (ROU)
8	Anna Łukasiak (POL)
9	Julie Sabatié (FRA)
10	Turkan Nasirova (AZE)
11	Emanuela Liuzzi (ITA)
12	Aintzane Gorría (ESP)
13	Ramona Eriksen (NOR)
