= 2017 European Wrestling Championships – Women's freestyle 48 kg =

The women's freestyle 48 kg is a competition featured at the 2017 European Wrestling Championships, and was held in Novi Sad, Serbia on May 2.

== Medalists ==
Gold	Mariya Stadnyk; Azerbaijan
Silver	Ilona Semkiv; Ukraine
Bronze	Fredrika Petersson; Sweden
Bronze	Alina Vuc; Romania

== Results ==
Legend

- F — Won by fall

=== Top half ===
==== Section 1 ====
Qualification
Katharina Baumgartner (GER)	0
Ilona Semkiv (UKR)	10
Miglena Selishka (BUL)	4
Milana Dadasheva (RUS)	14
Viyaleta Chyryk (BLR)	10
Eugenia Bustabad García (ESP)	0
Jessica Blaszka (NED)	8^{F}
Julijana Savić (SRB)	0
Karalina Tjapko (LAT)	0
Alina Vuc (ROU)	4^{F}
Mariya Stadnyk (AZE)	10
Anna Łukasiak (POL)	0
Julie Sabatié (FRA)	3
Evin Demirhan (TUR)	4

Quarterfinals
Fredrika Petersson (SWE)	2
Ilona Semkiv (UKR)	10^{F}
Milana Dadasheva (RUS)	4^{F}
Viyaleta Chyryk (BLR)	3
Jessica Blaszka (NED)	3
Alina Vuc (ROU)	13
Mariya Stadnyk (AZE)	14
Evin Demirhan (TUR)	1

Semifinals
Ilona Semkiv (UKR)	14
Milana Dadasheva (RUS)	4
Alina Vuc (ROU)	0
Mariya Stadnyk (AZE)	10

Final
Ilona Semkiv (UKR)	0
Mariya Stadnyk (AZE)	10

=== Repechage ===
Repechage round 2
Katharina Baumgartner (GER)	2
Fredrika Petersson (SWE)	5
Anna Łukasiak (POL)	7
Evin Demirhan (TUR)	3

Bronze medals
Fredrika Petersson (SWE)	2^{F}
Milana Dadasheva (RUS)	2
Anna Łukasiak (POL)	2
Alina Vuc (ROU)	5
