= 2020 Individual Wrestling World Cup – Women's freestyle 50 kg =

The Women's freestyle 50 kg is a competition featured at the 2020 Individual Wrestling World Cup, and was held in Belgrade, Serbia on 14 and 15 December 2020.

== Medalists ==
Gold	Ekaterina Poleshchuk; Russia
Silver	Liliia Malanchuk; Ukraine
Bronze	Lisa Ersel; Germany
Bronze	Miglena Selishka; Bulgaria

== Results ==
Legend

- F — Won by fall

1/8 finals
Ekaterina Poleshchuk (RUS)	6
Evin Demirhan (TUR)	0
Julie Sabatié (FRA)	0
Miglena Selishka (BUL)	6
Anna Łukasiak (POL)	9
Nirmala Devi (IND)	6

Quarterfinals
Liliia Malanchuk (UKR)	10
Gloria Asca (PER)	0
Debora Ture (GBS)	3
Lisa Ersel (GER)	6^{F}
Maria Leorda (MDA)	2
Ekaterina Poleshchuk (RUS)	4
Miglena Selishka (BUL)	5
Anna Łukasiak (POL)	2

Semifinals
Liliia Malanchuk (UKR)	16
Lisa Ersel (GER)	7
Ekaterina Poleshchuk (RUS)	2
Miglena Selishka (BUL)	2

Final
Liliia Malanchuk (UKR)	0
Ekaterina Poleshchuk (RUS)	10

Repechage round 1
Evin Demirhan (TUR)	10
Maria Leorda (MDA)	0

Bronze medals
Gloria Asca (PER)	0
Lisa Ersel (GER)	10
Evin Demirhan (TUR)	2
Miglena Selishka (BUL)	13
