= 2015 European Juniors Wrestling Championships =

Wrestling competition in Istanbul, Turkey

- Host city: Istanbul, Turkey
- Dates: June 23–28, 2015

Champions
- Freestyle: Russia
- Greco-Roman: Georgia
- Women: Azerbaijan

The 2015 European Juniors Wrestling Championships was held in Istanbul, Turkey between June 23–28, 2015.

== Medal table ==
Rank	Nation	Gold	Silver	Bronze	Total
1	Russia	8	3	4	15
2	Azerbaijan	5	4	6	15
3	Turkey	3	6	4	13
4	Germany	2	1	3	6
5	Georgia	2	0	8	10
6	Bulgaria	1	2	4	7
6	Ukraine	1	2	4	7
8	Italy	1	0	0	1
8	Norway	1	0	0	1
10	Hungary	0	2	4	6
11	Belarus	0	2	3	5
12	Moldova	0	1	2	3
13	Armenia	0	1	0	1
14	Sweden	0	0	2	2
15	Finland	0	0	1	1
15	France	0	0	1	1
15	Poland	0	0	1	1
15	Romania	0	0	1	1
Totals (18 entries)		24	24	48	96

== Team ranking ==
Rank	Men's freestyle		Men's Greco-Roman		Women's freestyle	
Rank	Team	Points	Team	Points	Team	Points
1	Russia	72	Georgia	60	Azerbaijan	58
2	Turkey	63	Turkey	55	Russia	50
3	Azerbaijan	41	Azerbaijan	49	Turkey	40
4	Georgia	40	Hungary	48	Ukraine	39
5	Ukraine	40	Russia	41	Germany	31

== Medal summary ==
=== Men's freestyle ===
Event	Gold	Silver	Bronze
50 kg	(Russia) Ismail Gadzhiev	(Armenia) Razmik Misakyan	(Georgia (country)) Roberti Dingashvili
50 kg	(Russia) Ismail Gadzhiev	(Armenia) Razmik Misakyan	(Germany) Viktor Lyzen
55 kg	(Russia) Ibragim Ilyasov	(Bulgaria) Mikyay Naim	(Moldova) Igor Chichioi
55 kg	(Russia) Ibragim Ilyasov	(Bulgaria) Mikyay Naim	(Turkey) Sezgin Pismicoglu
60 kg	(Russia) Nachyn Kuular	(Turkey) Selim Kozan	(Bulgaria) Dimitar Ivanov
60 kg	(Russia) Nachyn Kuular	(Turkey) Selim Kozan	(Azerbaijan) Vurgun Aliyev
66 kg	(Turkey) Enes Uslu	(Belarus) Surkho Rashytkhanau	(Georgia (country)) Avtandil Kentchadze
66 kg	(Turkey) Enes Uslu	(Belarus) Surkho Rashytkhanau	(Ukraine) Vasyl Mykhailov
74 kg	(Russia) Artem Umarov	(Turkey) Ahmet Ertürk	(Azerbaijan) Murad Suleymanov
74 kg	(Russia) Artem Umarov	(Turkey) Ahmet Ertürk	(Georgia (country)) Tarzan Maisuradze
84 kg	(Russia) Gadzhi Radzhabov	(Turkey) Mustafa Sessiz	(Georgia (country)) Giorgi Chkhartishvili
84 kg	(Russia) Gadzhi Radzhabov	(Turkey) Mustafa Sessiz	(Azerbaijan) Ghadzhimurad Magomedsaidov
96 kg	(Russia) Yuri Vlasko	(Germany) Eric Thiele	(Belarus) Dzianis Khramiankou
96 kg	(Russia) Yuri Vlasko	(Germany) Eric Thiele	(Finland) Jere Heino
120 kg	(Azerbaijan) Said Gamidov	(Turkey) Yunus Emre Dede	(Russia) Zelimkhan Khizriev
120 kg	(Azerbaijan) Said Gamidov	(Turkey) Yunus Emre Dede	(Belarus) Vitali Pesniak

=== Men's Greco-Roman ===
Event	Gold	Silver	Bronze
50 kg	(Azerbaijan) Nofal Babayev	(Russia) Aleksei Kinzhigaliev	(Georgia (country)) Nugzari Tsurtsumia
50 kg	(Azerbaijan) Nofal Babayev	(Russia) Aleksei Kinzhigaliev	(Bulgaria) Nedyalko Petrov
55 kg	(Georgia (country)) Irakli Shavadze	(Azerbaijan) Murad Mammadov	(Hungary) Erik Torba
55 kg	(Georgia (country)) Irakli Shavadze	(Azerbaijan) Murad Mammadov	(Bulgaria) Yoto Hristov
60 kg	(Turkey) Murat Fırat	(Ukraine) Parviz Nasibov	(Russia) Aslan Visaitov
60 kg	(Turkey) Murat Fırat	(Ukraine) Parviz Nasibov	(Georgia (country)) Levani Kavjaradze
66 kg	(Turkey) Cengiz Arslan	(Hungary) Otto Losonczi	(Azerbaijan) Ruhin Mikayilov
66 kg	(Turkey) Cengiz Arslan	(Hungary) Otto Losonczi	(Ukraine) Artem Matiash
74 kg	(Germany) Hannes Wagner	(Turkey) Furkan Bayrak	(Hungary) Zoltán Lévai
74 kg	(Germany) Hannes Wagner	(Turkey) Furkan Bayrak	(Georgia (country)) Gela Bolkvadze
84 kg	(Azerbaijan) Islam Abbasov	(Russia) Gadzhimurad Dzhalalov	(Turkey) Ali Cengiz
84 kg	(Azerbaijan) Islam Abbasov	(Russia) Gadzhimurad Dzhalalov	(Hungary) Bertalan Papp
96 kg	(Azerbaijan) Orkhan Nuriyev	(Bulgaria) Evgeni Ganchev	(Georgia (country)) Nikoloz Kakhelashvili
96 kg	(Azerbaijan) Orkhan Nuriyev	(Bulgaria) Evgeni Ganchev	(Hungary) Szolt Torok
120 kg	(Georgia (country)) Zviadi Pataridze	(Russia) Gadzhi Magomedov	(Turkey) Osman Yıldırım
120 kg	(Georgia (country)) Zviadi Pataridze	(Russia) Gadzhi Magomedov	(Belarus) Pavel Rudakou

=== Women's freestyle ===
Event	Gold	Silver	Bronze
44 kg	(Bulgaria) Miglena Selishka	(Belarus) Kseniya Stankevich	(Azerbaijan) Turkan Nasirova
44 kg	(Bulgaria) Miglena Selishka	(Belarus) Kseniya Stankevich	(Ukraine) Oksana Livach
48 kg	(Russia) Milana Dadasheva	(Moldova) Doina Roscovanu	(Turkey) Evin Demirhan
48 kg	(Russia) Milana Dadasheva	(Moldova) Doina Roscovanu	(Poland) Dominika Szynkowska
51 kg	(Ukraine) Olena Kremzer	(Azerbaijan) Leyla Gurbanova	(Russia) Ksenia Nezgovorova
51 kg	(Ukraine) Olena Kremzer	(Azerbaijan) Leyla Gurbanova	(Germany) Eva Sauer
55 kg	(Italy) Patrizia Liuzzi	(Azerbaijan) Alyona Kolesnik	(France) Sonia Baudin
55 kg	(Italy) Patrizia Liuzzi	(Azerbaijan) Alyona Kolesnik	(Moldova) Tatiana Doncila
59 kg	(Norway) Grace Bullen	(Hungary) Ramóna Galambos	(Sweden) Elin Nilsson
59 kg	(Norway) Grace Bullen	(Hungary) Ramóna Galambos	(Romania) Kriszta Incze
63 kg	(Russia) Lyubov Ovcharova	(Turkey) Buse Tosun	(Azerbaijan) Regnetta Gurbanzade
63 kg	(Russia) Lyubov Ovcharova	(Turkey) Buse Tosun	(Bulgaria) Victoria Bobeva
67 kg	(Germany) Nicole Amann	(Azerbaijan) Elis Manolova	(Sweden) Moa Nygreen
67 kg	(Germany) Nicole Amann	(Azerbaijan) Elis Manolova	(Ukraine) Alla Belinska
72 kg	(Azerbaijan) Sabira Aliyeva	(Ukraine) Anastasia Shustova	(Germany) Francy Rädelt
72 kg	(Azerbaijan) Sabira Aliyeva	(Ukraine) Anastasia Shustova	(Russia) Daria Shisterova

Preceded by 2014 Warsaw	European Juniors Wrestling Championships; 2015	Succeeded by 2016 Bucharest
