= 2026 European Wrestling Championships – Women's freestyle 50 kg =

Wrestling competition held in Tirana, Albania

Women's freestyle 50 kg at the 2026 European Wrestling Championships
- Venue: Tirana Olympic Park
- Location: Tirana, Albania
- Dates: 22–23 April
- Competitors: 10 from 8 nations

Medalists
gold medal	Oksana Livach	Ukraine
silver medal	Evin Demirhan Yavuz	Turkey
bronze medal	Elizaveta Smirnova
bronze medal	Alina Vuc	Romania

The women's freestyle 50 kilograms competition at the 2026 European Wrestling Championships was held from 22 to 23 April 2026 at the Tirana Olympic Park in Tirana, Albania.

== Results ==
Legend

- F — Won by fall

=== Main bracket ===
Round of 16
Maria Leorda (MDA)	0
Natallia Varakina (UWW)	3
Elnura Mammadova (AZE)	2
Agata Walerzak (POL)	2^{F}

Quarterfinals
Elizaveta Smirnova (UWW)	2
Natallia Varakina (UWW)	1
Svenja Jungo (SUI)	1
Oksana Livach (UKR)	12
Emanuela Liuzzi (ITA)	9
Alina Vuc (ROU)	19
Agata Walerzak (POL)	0
Evin Demirhan Yavuz (TUR)	4^{F}

Semifinals
Elizaveta Smirnova (UWW)	2
Oksana Livach (UKR)	6
Alina Vuc (ROU)	0
Evin Demirhan Yavuz (TUR)	6

Final
Oksana Livach (UKR)	11
Evin Demirhan Yavuz (TUR)	0

=== Repechage ===
Bronze medal matches
Svenja Jungo (SUI)	0
Elizaveta Smirnova (UWW)	4
Agata Walerzak (POL)	8
Alina Vuc (ROU)	11

== Final standing ==
Rank	Wrestler
1st place, gold medalist(s)	Oksana Livach (UKR)
2nd place, silver medalist(s)	Evin Demirhan Yavuz (TUR)
3rd place, bronze medalist(s)	Elizaveta Smirnova (UWW)
3rd place, bronze medalist(s)	Alina Vuc (ROU)
5	Svenja Jungo (SUI)
5	Agata Walerzak (POL)
7	Natallia Varakina (UWW)
8	Emanuela Liuzzi (ITA)
9	Elnura Mammadova (AZE)
10	Maria Leorda (MDA)
