= 2019 European Wrestling Championships – Women's freestyle 50 kg =

The women's freestyle 50 kg is a competition featured at the 2019 European Wrestling Championships, and was held in Bucharest, Romania on April 10 and April 11.

== Medalists ==
Gold	Oksana Livach; Ukraine
Silver	Miglena Selishka; Bulgaria
Bronze	Evin Demirhan; Turkey
Bronze	Kseniya Stankevich; Belarus

== Results ==
Legend

- F — Won by fall
- WO — Won by walkover

=== Main Bracket ===
1/8 finals
Evin Demirhan (TUR)	13
Emilia Cîrîcu (MDA)	0
Nadezhda Sokolova (RUS)	4^{F}
Karalina Tjapko (LAT)	0
Fredrika Petersson (SWE)	8
Kseniya Stankevich (BLR)	9
Iwona Matkowska (POL)	10
Athina Giagtzoglou (GRE)	0
Miglena Selishka (BUL)	9^{F}
Ştefania Priceputu (ROU)	0
Tabatha Grunewald (FRA)	WO
Emanuela Liuzzi (ITA)

Quarterfinals
Turkan Nasirova (AZE)	8
Oksana Livach (UKR)	10
Evin Demirhan (TUR)	2
Nadezhda Sokolova (RUS)	1
Kseniya Stankevich (BLR)	4
Iwona Matkowska (POL)	4
Miglena Selishka (BUL)	4
Tabatha Grunewald (FRA)	1

Semifinals
Oksana Livach (UKR)	2
Evin Demirhan (TUR)	0
Kseniya Stankevich (BLR)	4
Miglena Selishka (BUL)	11

Final
Oksana Livach (UKR)	6
Miglena Selishka (BUL)	4

=== Repechage ===
Repechage round 1
Ştefania Priceputu (ROU)	5
Tabatha Grunewald (FRA)	4

Bronze medal match
Turkan Nasirova (AZE)	3
Evin Demirhan (TUR)	10
Ştefania Priceputu (ROU)	2
Kseniya Stankevich (BLR)	10
