= 2025 Polyák Imre & Varga János Memorial Tournament – Women's freestyle =

The women's freestyle competitions at the 2025 Polyák Imre & Varga János Memorial Tournament were held in Budapest, Hungary between 18-19 July 2025.

== Women's freestyle ==
Legend

- DSQ — Disqualified
- F — Won by fall
- R — Retired
- WO — Won by walkover

=== Women's freestyle 50 kg ===
18 July

Round of 16
Laura Fáth (HUN)	0
Kseniya Stankevich (UWW)	6^{F}
Elizaveta Smirnova (UWW)	9
Nadezhda Sokolova (UWW)	2
Neelam Sirohi (IND)	10
Madison Parks (CAN)	8
Erin Golston (USA)	0
Evin Demirhan Yavuz (TUR)	8
Priyanshi Prajapat (IND)	3
Audrey Jimenez (USA)	0
Gabija Dilytė (LTU)	4^{F}
Kim Jin-hee (KOR)	0
Emma Luttenauer (FRA)	4
Natalia Pudova (UWW)	12

Quarterfinals
Svetlana Ankicheva (KAZ)	0
Kseniya Stankevich (UWW)	11
Elizaveta Smirnova (UWW)	10
Neelam Sirohi (IND)	0
Evin Demirhan Yavuz (TUR)	4^{F}
Priyanshi Prajapat (IND)	0
Gabija Dilytė (LTU)	0
Natalia Pudova (UWW)	11

Semifinals
Kseniya Stankevich (UWW)	0
Elizaveta Smirnova (UWW)	2^{F}
Evin Demirhan Yavuz (TUR)	4^{F}
Natalia Pudova (UWW)	2

Final
Elizaveta Smirnova (UWW)	6
Evin Demirhan Yavuz (TUR)	9

Repechage round 1
Nadezhda Sokolova (UWW)	7
Neelam Sirohi (IND)	18
Erin Golston (USA)	WO
Priyanshi Prajapat (IND)

Bronze medal match
Neelam Sirohi (IND)	6
Kseniya Stankevich (UWW)	3
Erin Golston (USA)	0
Natalia Pudova (UWW)	10

=== Women's freestyle 53 kg ===
18 July

Quarterfinals		Semifinals		Final
Vestina Danisevičiūtė (LTU)	0
Natalia Malysheva (UWW)	11	Natalia Malysheva (UWW)	5
Liliána Kapuvári (HUN)	1	Park Seo-young (KOR)	4
Park Seo-young (KOR)	5			Natalia Malysheva (UWW)	4
Antim Panghal (IND)	10			Antim Panghal (IND)	7
Zeynep Yetgil (TUR)	0	Antim Panghal (IND)	10
Felicity Taylor (USA)	8	Felicity Taylor (USA)	0
Zeinep Bayanova (KAZ)	7

Bronze medal match
Vestina Danisevičiūtė (LTU)	0
Park Seo-young (KOR)	5
Zeynep Yetgil (TUR)	0
Felicity Taylor (USA)	11

=== Women's freestyle 55 kg ===
Pos	Athlete	Pld	W	L	CP	TP	CAN	USA	IND
1	Karla Godinez (CAN)	2	2	0	6	8	—	4–1	4–2
2	Cristelle Rodriguez (USA)	2	1	1	4	9	1–3 PO1	—	8–2
3	Pushpa Yadav (IND)	2	0	2	2	4	1–3 PO1	1–3 PO1	—

Pos	Athlete	Pld	W	L	CP	TP	AIN	GER	TUR
1	Natalia Malysheva (UWW)	2	2	0	9	16	—	10–0	6–0 Fall
2	Amory Andrich (GER)	2	1	1	3	5	0–4 SU	—	5–0
3	Esra Pul (TUR)	2	0	2	0	0	0–5 FA	0–3 PO	—

Source: UWW

Semifinals
Karla Godinez (CAN)	9
Amory Andrich (GER)	1
Natalia Malysheva (UWW)	10
Cristelle Rodriguez (USA)	0

Final
Karla Godinez (CAN)	1
Natalia Malysheva (UWW)	6
Bronze medal
Amory Andrich (GER)	0
Cristelle Rodriguez (USA)	10

=== Women's freestyle 57 kg ===
18 July

Round of 16
Amanda Martinez (USA)	0
Helen Maroulis (USA)	6^{F}
Elvira Süleyman Kamaloğlu (TUR)
Róza Szenttamási (HUN)	WO

Quarterfinals
Iryna Kurachkina (UWW)	0
Helen Maroulis (USA)	7
Olga Khoroshavtseva (UWW)
Tamara Dollák (HUN)	WO
Nilufar Raimova (KAZ)	2
Neha Sharma (IND)	7
Róza Szenttamási (HUN)	6^{F}
Kwon Young-jin (KOR)	6

Semifinals
Helen Maroulis (USA)	11^{F}
Tamara Dollák (HUN)	0
Neha Sharma (IND)	8
Róza Szenttamási (HUN)	4

Final
Helen Maroulis (USA)	4^{F}
Neha Sharma (IND)	0

Repechage round 1
Amanda Martinez (USA)	1
Iryna Kurachkina (UWW)	11^{F}

Bronze medal match
Iryna Kurachkina (UWW)	10
Tamara Dollák (HUN)	3
Nilufar Raimova (KAZ)	7
Róza Szenttamási (HUN)	4

=== Women's freestyle 59 kg ===
18 July

Round of 16
Anastasiia Sidelnikova (UWW)	8
Marina Simonyan (UWW)	2

Quarterfinals
Othelie Høie (NOR)	5
Anastasiia Sidelnikova (UWW)	8
Elena Brugger (GER)	8
Abigail Nette (USA)	2
Arian Carpio (PHI)	1
Erika Bognár (HUN)	4
Nadzeya Bulanaya (UWW)	4
Bediha Gün (TUR)	2

Semifinals
Anastasiia Sidelnikova (UWW)	0
Elena Brugger (GER)	11^{F}
Erika Bognár (HUN)	5
Nadzeya Bulanaya (UWW)	1

Final
Elena Brugger (GER)	1
Erika Bognár (HUN)	2

Bronze medal match
Abigail Nette (USA)	7
Anastasiia Sidelnikova (UWW)	4
Arian Carpio (PHI)	0
Nadzeya Bulanaya (UWW)	4^{F}

=== Women's freestyle 62 kg ===
18 July

Round of 16
Amina Tandelova (UWW)	3
Améline Douarre (FRA)	1
Iris Thiébaux (FRA)	5
Tynys Dubek (KAZ)	3
Krystsina Sazykina (UWW)	6
Esther Kolawole (NGR)	2
Lee Han-bit (KOR)	0
Veranika Ivanova (UWW)	4^{F}
Nikolett Szabó (HUN)	0
Alina Kasabieva (UWW)	4^{F}
Bilyana Dudova (BUL)	12
Yasmine Soliman (HUN)	2
Ana Godinez (CAN)	6
Adaugo Nwachukwu (USA)	5

Quarterfinals
Manisha Bhanwala (IND)	0
Amina Tandelova (UWW)	11
Iris Thiébaux (FRA)	6
Krystsina Sazykina (UWW)	8
Veranika Ivanova (UWW)	3
Alina Kasabieva (UWW)	6
Bilyana Dudova (BUL)	4
Ana Godinez (CAN)	6^{F}

Semifinals
Amina Tandelova (UWW)	11
Krystsina Sazykina (UWW)	0
Alina Kasabieva (UWW)	12
Ana Godinez (CAN)	9

Final
Amina Tandelova (UWW)	3
Alina Kasabieva (UWW)	0

Repechage round 1
Améline Douarre (FRA)	2
Manisha Bhanwala (IND)	8^{F}
Nikolett Szabó (HUN)	2^{F}
Veranika Ivanova (UWW)	4

Bronze medal match
Manisha Bhanwala (IND)	9^{F}
Krystsina Sazykina (UWW)	0
Nikolett Szabó (HUN)	0
Ana Godinez (CAN)	10

=== Women's freestyle 65 kg ===
18 July

Quarterfinals		Semifinals		Final
Ekaterina Koshkina (UWW)
Irina Rîngaci (MDA)	WO	Irina Rîngaci (MDA)	10
Aine Drury (USA)	6	Enikő Elekes (HUN)	0
Enikő Elekes (HUN)	8^{F}			Irina Rîngaci (MDA)	16
Grace Bullen (NOR)	12			Grace Bullen (NOR)	10^{F}
Kadriye Aksoy Koçak (TUR)	2	Grace Bullen (NOR)	11^{F}
Aleah Nickel (CAN)	0	Macey Kilty (USA)	13
Macey Kilty (USA)	6

Bronze medal match
Ekaterina Koshkina (UWW)
Enikő Elekes (HUN)	WO
Kadriye Aksoy Koçak (TUR)	4
Macey Kilty (USA)	10

=== Women's freestyle 68 kg ===
18 July

Round of 16
Yuliana Yaneva (BUL)	10
Thais Sales (BRA)	0
Alina Shevchenko (UWW)	0
Kennedy Blades (USA)	10
Irina Kazyulina (KAZ)	1
Karolina Pók (HUN)	9
Noémi Szabados (HUN)	10
Gabriela Rocha (BRA)	0
Buse Tosun Çavuşoğlu (TUR)	5
Brooklyn Hays (USA)	6

Quarterfinals
Gerda Barth (GER)	1
Yuliana Yaneva (BUL)	12
Kennedy Blades (USA)	12
Karolina Pók (HUN)	1
Park Hyeon-yeong (KOR)	0
Noémi Szabados (HUN)	12
Brooklyn Hays (USA)	4
Kendra Dacher (FRA)	3

Semifinals
Yuliana Yaneva (BUL)	2
Kennedy Blades (USA)	6
Noémi Szabados (HUN)	10
Brooklyn Hays (USA)	0

Final
Kennedy Blades (USA)	13
Noémi Szabados (HUN)	2

Repechage round 1
Alina Shevchenko (UWW)	9
Karolina Pók (HUN)	0
Gabriela Rocha (BRA)	1
Park Hyeon-yeong (KOR)	2

Bronze medal match
Alina Shevchenko (UWW)	1
Yuliana Yaneva (BUL)	11
Park Hyeon-yeong (KOR)	4
Brooklyn Hays (USA)	5

=== Women's freestyle 72 kg ===
18 July

Pos	Athlete	Pld	W	L	CP	TP	IND	KAZ	AIN	AIN	FRA
1	Harshita Mor (IND)	4	4	0	19	24	—	10–0	6–1 Fall	WO	8–0 DSQ
2	Zhamila Bakbergenova (KAZ)	4	3	1	12	21	0–4 SU	—	10–2	11–1	DSQ
3	Kseniia Burakova (UWW)	4	2	2	9	9	0–5 FA	1–3 PO1	—	6—4	DSQ
4	Kristina Bratchikova (UWW)	4	1	3	7	5	0–5 IN	1–4 SU1	1–3 PO1	—	DSQ
—	Pauline Lecarpentier (FRA) DSQ	4	0	4	0	0	0–5 DSQ	0–5 DSQ	0–5 DSQ	0–5 DSQ	—

Source: UWW

=== Women's freestyle 76 kg ===
18 July

Round of 16
Dymond Guilford (USA)	7
Vianne Rouleau (CAN)	0
Elmira Syzdykova (KAZ)	6^{F}
Kamilė Gaučaitė (LTU)	1

Quarterfinals
Aiperi Medet Kyzy (KGZ)	4^{F}
Dymond Guilford (USA)	4
Jeong Seo-yeon (KOR)	0
Thamires Machado (BRA)	12^{F}
Valeriia Trifonova (UWW)	14
Elmira Yasin (TUR)	3
Elmira Syzdykova (KAZ)	2
Priya Malik (IND)	7

Semifinals
Aiperi Medet Kyzy (KGZ)	5
Thamires Machado (BRA)	10
Valeriia Trifonova (UWW)	1
Priya Malik (IND)	11

Final
Thamires Machado (BRA)	4
Priya Malik (IND)	3

Bronze medal match
Jeong Seo-yeon (KOR)	1
Aiperi Medet Kyzy (KGZ)	12
Elmira Syzdykova (KAZ)	11
Valeriia Trifonova (UWW)	0

== See also ==
- 2025 Polyák Imre & Varga János Memorial Tournament
