= 2018 European Wrestling Championships – Women's freestyle 50 kg =

The women's freestyle 50 kg is a competition featured at the 2018 European Wrestling Championships, and was held in Kaspiysk, Russia on May 2 and May 3.

== Medalists ==
Gold	Mariya Stadnyk; Azerbaijan
Silver	Alina Vuc; Romania
Bronze	Evin Demirhan; Turkey
Bronze	Milana Dadasheva; Russia

== Results ==
Legend

- F — Won by fall

=== Main Bracket ===
1/8 finals
Mariya Stadnyk (AZE)	10
Jaqueline Schellin (GER)	0
Fatme Mandeva (BUL)	0
Milana Dadasheva (RUS)	6^{F}
Anna Łukasiak (POL)	7
Oleksandra Kogut (AUT)	6
Tabatha Grunewald (FRA)	2
Kseniya Stankevich (BLR)	12

Quarterfinals
Alina Vuc (ROU)	4^{F}
Aintzane Gorría (ESP)	2
Evin Demirhan (TUR)	10
Oksana Livach (UKR)	9
Mariya Stadnyk (AZE)	10
Milana Dadasheva (RUS)	0
Anna Łukasiak (POL)	0
Kseniya Stankevich (BLR)	12

Semifinals
Alina Vuc (ROU)	13
Evin Demirhan (TUR)	3
Mariya Stadnyk (AZE)	10
Kseniya Stankevich (BLR)	0

Final
Alina Vuc (ROU)	0
Mariya Stadnyk (AZE)	10

=== Repechage ===
Repechage round 1
Jaqueline Schellin (GER)	2
Milana Dadasheva (RUS)	8

Bronze medal match
Aintzane Gorría (ESP)	0
Evin Demirhan (TUR)	6^{F}
Milana Dadasheva (RUS)	4^{F}
Kseniya Stankevich (BLR)	2
