= 2023 European Wrestling Championships – Women's freestyle 50 kg =

Wrestling competition

Women's freestyle 50 kg at the 2023 European Wrestling Championships
- Venue: Arena Zagreb
- Location: Zagreb, Croatia
- Dates: 19-20 April
- Competitors: 13

Medalists
gold medal	Mariya Stadnik	Azerbaijan
silver medal	Oksana Livach	Ukraine
bronze medal	Evin Demirhan	Turkey
bronze medal	Emanuela Liuzzi	Italy

The women's freestyle 50 kg is a competition featured at the 2023 European Wrestling Championships, and will held in Zagreb, Croatia on April 19 and 20.

== Results ==
Legend

- F — Won by fall
- WO — Won by walkover

Round of 16
Gabija Dilytė (LTU)	10
Maria Leorda (MDA)	2
Mariya Stadnik (AZE)	14
Evin Demirhan (TUR)	4
Szimonetta Szekér (HUN)	1
Julie Sabatié (FRA)	6^{F}
Emanuela Liuzzi (ITA)	9
Veronika Ryabovolova (MKD)	1
Miglena Selishka (BUL)	4^{F}
Svenja Jungo (SUI)	0

Quarterfinals
Anna Łukasiak (POL)	4^{F}
Gabija Dilytė (LTU)	0
Mariya Stadnik (AZE)	9
Julie Sabatié (FRA)	3
Oksana Livach (UKR)	12
Emanuela Liuzzi (ITA)	2
Miglena Selishka (BUL)	7
Alina Vuc (ROU)	2

Semifinals
Anna Łukasiak (POL)	0
Mariya Stadnik (AZE)	9
Oksana Livach (UKR)	3
Miglena Selishka (BUL)	2

Final
Mariya Stadnik (AZE)	9
Oksana Livach (UKR)	4

Repechage round 1
Evin Demirhan (TUR)	1
Julie Sabatié (FRA)	1

Bronze medal match
Evin Demirhan (TUR)	6
Anna Łukasiak (POL)	2
Emanuela Liuzzi (ITA)	WO
Miglena Selishka (BUL)

== Final standing ==
Rank	Athlete
1st place, gold medalist(s)	Mariya Stadnik (AZE)
2nd place, silver medalist(s)	Oksana Livach (UKR)
3rd place, bronze medalist(s)	Evin Demirhan (TUR)
3rd place, bronze medalist(s)	Emanuela Liuzzi (ITA)
5	Anna Łukasiak (POL)
5	Miglena Selishka (BUL)
7	Julie Sabatié (FRA)
8	Gabija Dilytė (LTU)
9	Alina Vuc (ROU)
10	Maria Leorda (MDA)
11	Veronika Ryabovolova (MKD)
12	Szimonetta Szekér (HUN)
13	Svenja Jungo (SUI)
