= 2022 European Wrestling Championships – Women's freestyle 50 kg =

Wrestling competition

Women's freestyle 50 kg at the 2022 European Wrestling Championships
- Venue: BOK Sports Hall
- Location: Budapest, Hungary
- Dates: 30-31 March
- Competitors: 11

Medalists
gold medal	Evin Demirhan	Turkey
silver medal	Miglena Selishka	Bulgaria
bronze medal	Alina Vuc	Romania
bronze medal	Anna Łukasiak	Poland

The women's freestyle 50 kg was a competition featured at the 2022 European Wrestling Championships, and was held in Budapest, Hungary on March 30 and 31.

== Results ==
Legend

- F — Won by fall

=== Main Bracket ===
1/8 finals
Emanuela Liuzzi (ITA)	6
Nataliia Klivchutska (UKR)	4
Julie Sabatié (FRA)	1
Emilia Cîrîcu (MDA)	4
Szimonetta Szekér (HUN)	2
Turkan Nasirova (AZE)	3

Quarterfinals
Alina Vuc (ROU)	8
Emanuela Liuzzi (ITA)	2
Lisa Ersel (GER)	2
Evin Demirhan (TUR)	11
Anna Łukasiak (POL)	8
Emilia Cîrîcu (MDA)	2
Turkan Nasirova (AZE)	0
Miglena Selishka (BUL)	10

Semifinals
Alina Vuc (ROU)	5
Evin Demirhan (TUR)	8
Anna Łukasiak (POL)	4
Miglena Selishka (BUL)	5

Final
Evin Demirhan (TUR)	4^{F}
Miglena Selishka (BUL)	2

=== Repechage ===
Bronze medal match
Lisa Ersel (GER)	0
Alina Vuc (ROU)	4^{F}
Turkan Nasirova (AZE)	4
Anna Łukasiak (POL)	6

== Final standing ==
Rank	Wrestler	UWW Points
1st place, gold medalist(s)	Evin Demirhan (TUR)	10000
2nd place, silver medalist(s)	Miglena Selishka (BUL)	8000
3rd place, bronze medalist(s)	Alina Vuc (ROU)	6500
3rd place, bronze medalist(s)	Anna Łukasiak (POL)	6500
5	Lisa Ersel (GER)	5000
5	Turkan Nasirova (AZE)	5000
7	Emanuela Liuzzi (ITA)	4400
8	Emilia Cîrîcu (MDA)	4000
9	Nataliia Klivchutska (UKR)	3500
10	Szimonetta Szekér (HUN)	3100
11	Julie Sabatié (FRA)	1000
