= 2021 European Wrestling Championships – Women's freestyle 50 kg =

Wrestling competition

The women's freestyle 50 kg is a competition featured at the 2021 European Wrestling Championships, and was held in Warsaw, Poland on April 21 and April 22.

== Medalists ==
Gold	Mariya Stadnik; Azerbaijan
Silver	Miglena Selishka; Bulgaria
Bronze	Anna Łukasiak; Poland
Bronze	Ekaterina Poleshchuk; Russia

== Results ==
Legend

- F — Won by fall

1/8 finals
Alina Vuc (ROU)	12
Natallia Varakina (BLR)	1
Evin Demirhan (TUR)	8
Oksana Livach (UKR)	12

Quarterfinals
Anna Łukasiak (POL)	1
Miglena Selishka (BUL)	3
Emilia Cîrîcu (MDA)	12
Ramona Eriksen (NOR)	1
Mariya Stadnik (AZE)	11
Ekaterina Poleshchuk (RUS)	0
Alina Vuc (ROU)	2
Oksana Livach (UKR)	12

Semifinals
Miglena Selishka (BUL)	3
Emilia Cîrîcu (MDA)	3
Mariya Stadnik (AZE)	10
Oksana Livach (UKR)	4

Final
Miglena Selishka (BUL)	2
Mariya Stadnik (AZE)	7

Bronze medal match
Anna Łukasiak (POL)	10
Emilia Cîrîcu (MDA)	0
Ekaterina Poleshchuk (RUS)	10
Oksana Livach (UKR)	9

== Final standing ==
Rank	Athlete
1st place, gold medalist(s)	Mariya Stadnik (AZE)
2nd place, silver medalist(s)	Miglena Selishka (BUL)
3rd place, bronze medalist(s)	Anna Łukasiak (POL)
3rd place, bronze medalist(s)	Ekaterina Poleshchuk (RUS)
5	Emilia Cîrîcu (MDA)
5	Oksana Livach (UKR)
7	Alina Vuc (ROU)
8	Evin Demirhan (TUR)
9	Ramona Eriksen (NOR)
10	Natallia Varakina (BLR)
