= Wrestling at the 2022 Mediterranean Games – Women's freestyle 50 kg =

Wrestling competitions

Women's Freestyle 50 kg at the 2022 Mediterranean Games
- Venue: EMEC Hall
- Date: 28–29 June
- Competitors: 7 from 7 nations

Medalists
| gold medal | Evin Demirhan | Turkey |
| silver medal | Julie Sabatié | France |
| bronze medal | Sarra Hamdi | Tunisia |

The women's freestyle 50 kg competition of the wrestling events at the 2022 Mediterranean Games in Oran, Algeria, was held from 28 June to 29 June at the EMEC Hall.

== Results ==
26 June

=== Elimination groups ===
==== Group A ====
| Pos | Athlete | Pld | W | L | CP | TP |
|---|---|---|---|---|---|---|
| 1 | Evin Demirhan (TUR) | 3 | 3 | 0 | 13 | 22 |
| 2 | Emanuela Liuzzi (ITA) | 3 | 2 | 1 | 8 | 17 |
| 3 | Aintzane Gorría (ESP) | 3 | 1 | 2 | 3 | 12 |
| 4 | Ibtissem Doudou (ALG) | 3 | 0 | 3 | 2 | 5 |

Source: Oran 2022

| | Score | | CP |
|---|---|---|---|
| Ibtissem Doudou (ALG) | 0–6 | Evin Demirhan (TUR) | 0–3 VPO |
| Aintzane Gorría (ESP) | 4–13 Fall | Emanuela Liuzzi (ITA) | 0–5 VFA |
| Ibtissem Doudou (ALG) | 2–8 | Aintzane Gorría (ESP) | 1–3 VPO1 |
| Evin Demirhan (TUR) | 8–1 Fall | Emanuela Liuzzi (ITA) | 5–0 VFA |
| Emanuela Liuzzi (ITA) | 3–3 | Ibtissem Doudou (ALG) | 3–1 VPO1 |
| Evin Demirhan (TUR) | 8–0 Fall | Aintzane Gorría (ESP) | 5–0 VFA |

==== Group B ====
| Pos | Athlete | Pld | W | L | CP | TP |
|---|---|---|---|---|---|---|
| 1 | Julie Sabatié (FRA) | 2 | 2 | 0 | 6 | 14 |
| 2 | Sarra Hamdi (TUN) | 2 | 1 | 1 | 6 | 5 |
| 3 | Nada Medani (EGY) | 2 | 0 | 2 | 1 | 4 |

Source: Oran 2022

| | Score | | CP |
|---|---|---|---|
| Nada Medani (EGY) | 3–10 | Julie Sabatié (FRA) | 1–3 VPO1 |
| Sarra Hamdi (TUN) | 3–1 Fall | Nada Medani (EGY) | 5–0 VFA |
| Julie Sabatié (FRA) | 4–2 | Sarra Hamdi (TUN) | 3–1 VPO1 |

Semifinals
Evin Demirhan (TUR) | 6
Sarra Hamdi (TUN) | 5
Emanuela Liuzzi (ITA) | 1
Julie Sabatié (FRA) | 11

Final
Evin Demirhan (TUR) | 3
Julie Sabatié (FRA) | 2
Bronze medal
Sarra Hamdi (TUN) | 4
Emanuela Liuzzi (ITA) | 2
