= 2025 World Wrestling Championships – Women's freestyle 50 kg =

Wrestling competitions

Women's freestyle 50 kg at the 2025 World Championships
- Venue: Arena Zagreb
- Dates: 16–17 September 2025
- Competitors: 21 from 19 nations

Medalists
gold medal	Won Myong-gyong	North Korea
silver medal	Zhang Yu	China
bronze medal	Elizaveta Smirnova
bronze medal	Evin Demirhan Yavuz	Turkey

The women's freestyle 50 kilograms is a competition featured at the 2025 World Wrestling Championships, and was held in Zagreb, Croatia on 16 and 17 September 2025.

This freestyle wrestling competition consists of a single-elimination tournament, with a repechage used to determine the winner of two bronze medals. The two finalists face off for gold and silver medals. Each wrestler who loses to one of the two finalists moves into the repechage, culminating in a pair of bronze medal matches, featuring the semifinal losers each facing the remaining repechage opponent from their half of the bracket.

== Results ==
Legend

- F — Won by fall

=== Final ===
Final
Won Myong-gyong (PRK)	8
Zhang Yu (CHN)	2

=== Top half ===
Round of 32
Cheima Chebila (ALG)	8
Kamila Barbosa (BRA)	0
Elizaveta Smirnova (UWW)	8
Won Myong-gyong (PRK)	10
Aintzane Gorría (ESP)	2
Kim Jin-hee (KOR)	7

Round of 16
Oksana Livach (UKR)	9
Aktenge Keunimjaeva (UZB)	2
Cheima Chebila (ALG)	0
Remina Yoshimoto (JPN)	10
Svetlana Ankicheva (KAZ)	0
Won Myong-gyong (PRK)	10
Kim Jin-hee (KOR)	0
Madison Parks (CAN)	6^{F}

Quarterfinals
Oksana Livach (UKR)	4
Remina Yoshimoto (JPN)	11
Won Myong-gyong (PRK)	12
Madison Parks (CAN)	0

Semifinals
Remina Yoshimoto (JPN)	2
Won Myong-gyong (PRK)	3

=== Bottom half ===
Round of 32
Ankush Panghal (IND)	5
Natallia Varakina (UWW)	6
Emanuela Liuzzi (ITA)	6
Chahrazed Ayachi (TUN)	0

Round of 16
Gabija Dilytė (LTU)	6
Nohalis Loyo (VEN)	3^{F}
Natallia Varakina (UWW)	2
Byambasürengiin Mönkhnar (MGL)	4
Audrey Jimenez (USA)	3
Emanuela Liuzzi (ITA)	6
Zhang Yu (CHN)	12
Evin Demirhan Yavuz (TUR)	2

Quarterfinals
Nohalis Loyo (VEN)	0
Byambasürengiin Mönkhnar (MGL)	2
Emanuela Liuzzi (ITA)	0
Zhang Yu (CHN)	8

Semifinals
Byambasürengiin Mönkhnar (MGL)	0
Zhang Yu (CHN)	9^{F}

=== Repechage ===
Repechage round 1
Elizaveta Smirnova (UWW)	7
Svetlana Ankicheva (KAZ)	1

Repechage round 2
Elizaveta Smirnova (UWW)	8
Madison Parks (CAN)	0
Evin Demirhan Yavuz (TUR)	6
Emanuela Liuzzi (ITA)	3

Bronze medals
Elizaveta Smirnova (UWW)	3
Remina Yoshimoto (JPN)	3
Evin Demirhan Yavuz (TUR)	3
Byambasürengiin Mönkhnar (MGL)	2

== Final standing ==
Rank	Athlete
1st place, gold medalist(s)	Won Myong-gyong (PRK)
2nd place, silver medalist(s)	Zhang Yu (CHN)
3rd place, bronze medalist(s)	Elizaveta Smirnova (UWW)
3rd place, bronze medalist(s)	Evin Demirhan Yavuz (TUR)
5	Remina Yoshimoto (JPN)
5	Byambasürengiin Mönkhnar (MGL)
7	Emanuela Liuzzi (ITA)
8	Madison Parks (CAN)
9	Nohalis Loyo (VEN)
10	Oksana Livach (UKR)
11	Natallia Varakina (UWW)
12	Cheima Chebila (ALG)
13	Kim Jin-hee (KOR)
14	Ankush Panghal (IND)
15	Audrey Jimenez (USA)
16	Aintzane Gorría (ESP)
17	Aktenge Keunimjaeva (UZB)
18	Svetlana Ankicheva (KAZ)
19	Gabija Dilytė (LTU)
20	Chahrazed Ayachi (TUN)
21	Kamila Barbosa (BRA)
