= 2025 Muhamet Malo Tournament – Women's freestyle =

The women's freestyle competitions at the 2025 Muhamet Malo Tournament were held in Tirana, Albania between 27 February and 1 March 2025.

== Women's freestyle ==
=== Women's freestyle 50 kg ===
27 February

Round of 16
Shi Keke (CHN)	0
Svetlana Ankicheva (KAZ)	10
Alina Vuc (ROU)
Oksana Livach (UKR)	WO
Meiduolaji (CHN)	7
Yu Liying (CHN)	2
Madison Parks (CAN)	5
Zehra Demirhan (TUR)	4
Katie Dutchak (CAN)	10
Kamila Barbosa (BRA)	0
Umi Ito (JPN)	10
Aida Kerymova (UKR)	0

Quarterfinals
Erin Golston (USA)	4
Svetlana Ankicheva (KAZ)	1
Oksana Livach (UKR)	6
Meiduolaji (CHN)	4
Madison Parks (CAN)	5
Katie Dutchak (CAN)	6
Umi Ito (JPN)	16
Nadezhda Sokolova (UWW)	5

Semifinals
Erin Golston (USA)	0
Oksana Livach (UKR)	7
Katie Dutchak (CAN)	0
Umi Ito (JPN)	4^{F}

Final
Oksana Livach (UKR)	0
Umi Ito (JPN)	10

Repechage round 1
Alina Vuc (ROU)
Meiduolaji (CHN)	WO
Aida Kerymova (UKR)	0
Nadezhda Sokolova (UWW)	10

Bronze medal match
Meiduolaji (CHN)	2
Erin Golston (USA)	4
Nadezhda Sokolova (UWW)	10
Katie Dutchak (CAN)	0

=== Women's freestyle 53 kg ===
1 March

Round of 16
Moe Kiyooka (JPN)	10
Felicity Taylor (USA)	0
Zhou Meilin (CHN)	5
Iulia Leorda (MDA)	0

Quarterfinals
Li Yuxuan (CHN)	2
Moe Kiyooka (JPN)	12
Adrianny Castillo (ARG)	0
Liliia Malanchuk (UKR)	6^{F}
Natalia Malysheva (UWW)	3
Andreea Ana (ROU)	3
Zhou Meilin (CHN)	1
Zeynep Yetgil (TUR)	2

Semifinals
Moe Kiyooka (JPN)	15
Liliia Malanchuk (UKR)	8
Andreea Ana (ROU)	2
Zeynep Yetgil (TUR)	1

Final
Moe Kiyooka (JPN)	6
Andreea Ana (ROU)	0

Repechage round 1
Felicity Taylor (USA)	1
Li Yuxuan (CHN)	11

Bronze medal match
Li Yuxuan (CHN)	10
Liliia Malanchuk (UKR)	0
Natalia Malysheva (UWW)	7
Zeynep Yetgil (TUR)	0

=== Women's freestyle 55 kg ===
27 February

Quarterfinals
Jacarra Winchester (USA)
Mariana Drăguțan (MDA)	WO
Olga Khoroshavtseva (UWW)	6^{F}
Ekaterina Verbina (UWW)	0
Karla Godinez (CAN)	0
Haruna Murayama (JPN)	2
Oleksandra Khomenets (UKR)	10
Irena Binkova (BUL)	0

Semifinals
Mariana Drăguțan (MDA)	4
Olga Khoroshavtseva (UWW)	6
Haruna Murayama (JPN)	10
Oleksandra Khomenets (UKR)	0

Final
Olga Khoroshavtseva (UWW)	0
Haruna Murayama (JPN)	5

Bronze medals
Ekaterina Verbina (UWW)	10
Mariana Drăguțan (MDA)	0
Karla Godinez (CAN)	1
Oleksandra Khomenets (UKR)	3

=== Women's freestyle 57 kg ===
27 February

Quarterfinals
Sezim Zhumanazarova (KGZ)	1
Amanda Martinez (USA)	6
Evelina Hulthén (SWE)	0
Elvira Süleyman Kamaloğlu (TUR)	2
Sezen Belberova (BUL)	0
Luisa Valverde (ECU)	5^{F}
Tamara Dollák (HUN)	2
Samantha Stewart (CAN)	4^{F}

Semifinals
Amanda Martinez (USA)	3
Elvira Süleyman Kamaloğlu (TUR)	9
Luisa Valverde (ECU)	2
Samantha Stewart (CAN)	7

Final
Elvira Süleyman Kamaloğlu (TUR)	2
Samantha Stewart (CAN)	7^{F}

Bronze medals
Evelina Hulthén (SWE)	3
Amanda Martinez (USA)	4
Tamara Dollák (HUN)	2
Luisa Valverde (ECU)	5

=== Women's freestyle 59 kg ===
28 February

Pos	Athlete	Pld	W	L	CP	TP	UWW	UKR	HUN	ITA
1	Anastasiia Sidelnikova (UWW)	3	3	0	10	18	—	4–2	4–1	10–0
2	Solomiia Vynnyk (UKR)	3	2	1	9	22	1–3 PO1	—	10–0	10–0
3	Erika Bognár (HUN)	3	1	2	5	11	1–3 PO1	0–4 SU	—	10–0
4	Elena Esposito (ITA)	3	0	3	0	0	0–4 SU	0–4 SU	0–4 SU	—

Source: UWW

Pos	Athlete	Pld	W	L	CP	TP	JPN	TUR	USA
1	Sakura Onishi (JPN)	2	2	0	8	22	—	10–0	12–1
2	Bediha Gün (TUR)	2	1	1	3	9	0–4 SU	—	9–6
3	Abigail Nette (USA)	2	0	2	2	7	1–4 SU1	1–3 PO1	—

Source: UWW

Semifinals
Anastasiia Sidelnikova (UWW)	4
Bediha Gün (TUR)	4
Sakura Onishi (JPN)	13
Solomiia Vynnyk (UKR)	2

Final
Anastasiia Sidelnikova (UWW)	0
Sakura Onishi (JPN)	10
Bronze medal
Bediha Gün (TUR)	2
Solomiia Vynnyk (UKR)	12

=== Women's freestyle 62 kg ===
28 February

Round of 16
Bilyana Dudova (BUL)	9^{F}
Nikolett Szabó (HUN)	0
Johanna Lindborg (SWE)	0
Grace Bullen (NOR)	10
Zhang Qi (CHN)	8
Amina Tandelova (UWW)	12

Quarterfinals
Adaugo Nwachukwu (USA)	4
Bilyana Dudova (BUL)	6
Anne Nürnberger (GER)	8
Aurora Campagna (ITA)	2
Kalmira Bilimbekova (KGZ)	0
Grace Bullen (NOR)	4^{F}
Amina Tandelova (UWW)
Lili (CHN)	WO

Semifinals
Bilyana Dudova (BUL)	11
Anne Nürnberger (GER)	0
Grace Bullen (NOR)	5
Lili (CHN)	8

Final
Bilyana Dudova (BUL)	4
Lili (CHN)	8

Repechage round 1
Nikolett Szabó (HUN)	1
Adaugo Nwachukwu (USA)	8

Bronze medal match
Adaugo Nwachukwu (USA)	11
Anne Nürnberger (GER)	0
Amina Tandelova (UWW)
Grace Bullen (NOR)	WO

=== Women's freestyle 65 kg ===
28 February

Pos	Athlete	Pld	W	L	CP	TP	UKR	CAN	ALB	USA
1	Iryna Koliadenko (UKR)	3	3	0	13	22	—	10–0	12–2	WO
2	Aleah Nickel (CAN)	3	1	2	6	8	0–4 SU	—	6–6 Fall	2–9
3	Albina Drazhi (ALB)	3	1	2	6	8	1–4 SU1	0–5 FA	—	WO
4	Jennifer Rogers (USA)	3	1	2	3	9	0–5 IN	3–1 PO1	0–5 IN	—

Source: UWW

Pos	Athlete	Pld	W	L	CP	TP	MDA	JPN	CHN
1	Irina Rîngaci (MDA)	2	2	0	7	17	—	7–5	10–0
2	Miwa Morikawa (JPN)	2	1	1	4	8	1–3 PO1	—	3–0
3	Rao Yuqi (CHN)	2	0	2	0	0	0–4 SU	0–3 PO	—

Source: UWW

Semifinals
Iryna Koliadenko (UKR)	3
Miwa Morikawa (JPN)	6
Irina Rîngaci (MDA)	10
Aleah Nickel (CAN)	0

Final
Miwa Morikawa (JPN)	3
Irina Rîngaci (MDA)	6^{R}
Bronze medal
Iryna Koliadenko (UKR)	10
Aleah Nickel (CAN)	0

=== Women's freestyle 68 kg ===
28 February

Round of 16
Noémi Szabados (HUN)	12^{F}
Gulnura Tashtanbekova (KGZ)	2

Quarterfinals
Tindra Sjöberg (SWE)	3
Noémi Szabados (HUN)	5
Li Zelu (CHN)	7
Elizaveta Petliakova (UWW)	2
Kateryna Zelenykh (ROU)	7
Liu Yuqi (CHN)	0
Ami Ishii (JPN)	10^{F}
Gerda Barth (GER)	0

Semifinals
Noémi Szabados (HUN)	0
Li Zelu (CHN)	10
Kateryna Zelenykh (ROU)	2
Ami Ishii (JPN)	13

Final
Li Zelu (CHN)	2
Ami Ishii (JPN)	8

Bronze medals
Elizaveta Petliakova (UWW)	WO
Noémi Szabados (HUN)
Gerda Barth (GER)	0
Kateryna Zelenykh (ROU)	6^{F}

=== Women's freestyle 72 kg ===
28 February

Pos	Athlete	Pld	W	L	CP	TP	KAZ	UKR	USA	ARG
1	Zhamila Bakbergenova (KAZ)	3	2	1	9	10	—	3–1	2–7	5–5 Fall
2	Alla Belinska (UKR)	3	2	1	9	9	1–3 PO1	—	4–3	4–0 Fall
3	Alexandria Glaudé (USA)	3	2	1	7	15	1–3 PO1	1–3 PO1	—	5–1
4	Linda Machuca (ARG)	3	0	3	1	6	0–5 FA	0–5 FA	1–3 PO1	—

Source: UWW

=== Women's freestyle 76 kg ===
28 February

Round of 16
Elmira Syzdykova (KAZ)	8^{F}
Valeriia Trifonova (UWW)	0
Dymond Guilford (USA)	4
Yangla (CHN)	3
Anastasiya Alpyeyeva (UKR)	11
Nodoka Yamamoto (JPN)	1
Aiperi Medet Kyzy (KGZ)	11
Zhang Meile (CHN)	0

Quarterfinals
Alexandra Anghel (ROU)	1
Elmira Syzdykova (KAZ)	12
Dymond Guilford (USA)	WO
Bernadett Nagy (HUN)
Vanesa Georgieva (BUL)	0
Anastasiya Alpyeyeva (UKR)	10
Aiperi Medet Kyzy (KGZ)	9
Enrica Rinaldi (ITA)	0

Semifinals
Elmira Syzdykova (KAZ)	1
Dymond Guilford (USA)	14
Anastasiya Alpyeyeva (UKR)	0
Aiperi Medet Kyzy (KGZ)	10

Final
Dymond Guilford (USA)	2
Aiperi Medet Kyzy (KGZ)	1

Repechage round 1
Yangla (CHN)	WO
Bernadett Nagy (HUN)
Zhang Meile (CHN)	3^{F}
Enrica Rinaldi (ITA)	3

Bronze medal match
Yangla (CHN)	2
Elmira Syzdykova (KAZ)	5^{F}
Zhang Meile (CHN)	1
Anastasiya Alpyeyeva (UKR)	2
