= 2022 World Wrestling Championships – Women's freestyle 50 kg =

Wrestling competitions

Women's freestyle 50 kg at the 2022 World Championships
- Venue: Štark Arena
- Dates: 13–14 September 2022
- Competitors: 22 from 22 nations

Medalists
gold medal	Yui Susaki	Japan
silver medal	Dolgorjavyn Otgonjargal	Mongolia
bronze medal	Sarah Hildebrandt	United States
bronze medal	Anna Łukasiak	Poland

The women's freestyle 50 kilograms is a competition featured at the 2022 World Wrestling Championships, and was held in Belgrade, Serbia on 13 and 14 September 2022.

This freestyle wrestling competition consists of a single-elimination tournament, with a repechage used to determine the winner of two bronze medals. The two finalists face off for gold and silver medals. Each wrestler who loses to one of the two finalists moves into the repechage, culminating in a pair of bronze medal matches featuring the semifinal losers each facing the remaining repechage opponent from their half of the bracket.

== Results ==
Legend

- F — Won by fall
- R — Retired

=== Final ===
Final
Dolgorjavyn Otgonjargal (MGL)	0
Yui Susaki (JPN)	4^{F}

=== Top half ===
Round of 32
Zehra Demirhan (TUR)	5
Patricia Bermúdez (ARG)	10^{F}
Rita Rojas (MEX)	0
Jasmina Immaeva (UZB)	11
Szimonetta Szekér (HUN)	2
Neelam Sirohi (IND)	4

Round of 16
Sarah Hildebrandt (USA)	10
Kamila Barbosa (BRA)	0
Patricia Bermúdez (ARG)	0
Oksana Livach (UKR)	10
Dolgorjavyn Otgonjargal (MGL)	3^{F}
Jasmina Immaeva (UZB)	0
Neelam Sirohi (IND)	0
Alina Vuc (ROU)	10

Quarterfinals
Sarah Hildebrandt (USA)	11
Oksana Livach (UKR)	0
Dolgorjavyn Otgonjargal (MGL)	11^{F}
Alina Vuc (ROU)	0

Semifinals
Sarah Hildebrandt (USA)	2
Dolgorjavyn Otgonjargal (MGL)	6

=== Bottom half ===
Round of 32
Lisa Ersel (GER)	0
Mercy Genesis (NGR)	8^{F}
Svetlana Ankicheva (KAZ)	5
Cheon Mi-ran (KOR)	3
Julie Sabatié (FRA)	5
Feng Ziqi (CHN)	3

Round of 16
Miglena Selishka (BUL)	0^{R}
Mercy Genesis (NGR)	7
Svetlana Ankicheva (KAZ)	0
Madison Parks (CAN)	4
Anna Łukasiak (POL)	2
Julie Sabatié (FRA)	1
Nguyễn Thị Xuân (VIE)	0
Yui Susaki (JPN)	10

Quarterfinals
Mercy Genesis (NGR)	6
Madison Parks (CAN)	5
Anna Łukasiak (POL)	0
Yui Susaki (JPN)	10

Semifinals
Mercy Genesis (NGR)	0
Yui Susaki (JPN)	8^{F}

=== Repechage ===
Repechage round 2
Jasmina Immaeva (UZB)	1
Alina Vuc (ROU)	2^{F}
Nguyễn Thị Xuân (VIE)	3
Anna Łukasiak (POL)	4

Bronze medals
Alina Vuc (ROU)	0
Sarah Hildebrandt (USA)	10
Anna Łukasiak (POL)	3
Mercy Genesis (NGR)	2

== Final standing ==
Rank	Athlete
1st place, gold medalist(s)	Yui Susaki (JPN)
2nd place, silver medalist(s)	Dolgorjavyn Otgonjargal (MGL)
3rd place, bronze medalist(s)	Sarah Hildebrandt (USA)
3rd place, bronze medalist(s)	Anna Łukasiak (POL)
5	Alina Vuc (ROU)
5	Mercy Genesis (NGR)
7	Patricia Bermúdez (ARG)
8	Jasmina Immaeva (UZB)
9	Oksana Livach (UKR)
10	Madison Parks (CAN)
11	Julie Sabatié (FRA)
12	Svetlana Ankicheva (KAZ)
13	Neelam Sirohi (IND)
14	Cheon Mi-ran (KOR)
15	Feng Ziqi (CHN)
16	Nguyễn Thị Xuân (VIE)
17	Szimonetta Szekér (HUN)
18	Zehra Demirhan (TUR)
19	Miglena Selishka (BUL)
20	Lisa Ersel (GER)
21	Kamila Barbosa (BRA)
22	Rita Rojas (MEX)
