= Wrestling at the 2019 European Games – Women's freestyle 50 kg =

Women's freestyle 50kg at the 2019 European Games
- Venue: Minsk Sports Palace
- Date: 27 June and 28 June
- Competitors: 13 from 13 nations

Medalists
gold medal	Mariya Stadnik	Azerbaijan
silver medal	Oksana Livach	Ukraine
bronze medal	Evin Demirhan	Turkey
bronze medal	Miglena Selishka	Bulgaria

The women's freestyle 50 kilograms wrestling competition at the 2019 European Games in Minsk was held on 27 to 28 June 2019 at the Minsk Sports Palace.

== Schedule ==
All times are in FET (UTC+03:00)

Date	Time	Event
Thursday, 27 June 2019	12:40	1/8 finals
Thursday, 27 June 2019	13:50	Quarterfinals
Thursday, 27 June 2019	18:30	Semifinals
Friday, 28 June 2019	11:20	Repechage
Friday, 28 June 2019	20:00	Finals

== Results ==
Legend

- F — Won by fall

=== Main bracket ===
1/8 finals
Emanuela Liuzzi (ITA)	0
Anna Łukasiak (POL)	8
Miglena Selishka (BUL)	11
Anzhelika Vetoshkina (RUS)	0
Oksana Livach (UKR)	12
Maria Cioclea (ROU)	1
Emilia Cîrîcu (MDA)	6
Athina Giagtzoglou (GRE)	1
Viyaleta Chyryk (BLR)	10
Karalina Tjapko (LAT)	0

Quarterfinals
Tabatha Grunewald (FRA)	4
Evin Demirhan (TUR)	8
Mariya Stadnik (AZE)	10
Anna Łukasiak (POL)	0
Miglena Selishka (BUL)	1
Oksana Livach (UKR)	2
Emilia Cîrîcu (MDA)	0
Viyaleta Chyryk (BLR)	6

Semifinals
Evin Demirhan (TUR)	1
Mariya Stadnik (AZE)	6
Oksana Livach (UKR)	5
Viyaleta Chyryk (BLR)	0

Final
Mariya Stadnik (AZE)	7
Oksana Livach (UKR)	1

=== Repechage ===
Repechage round 1
Maria Cioclea (ROU)	0
Miglena Selishka (BUL)	4^{F}

Bronze medals
Anna Łukasiak (POL)	2
Evin Demirhan (TUR)	6
Miglena Selishka (BUL)	6
Viyaleta Chyryk (BLR)	0
