= 2022 U23 World Wrestling Championships – Women's freestyle 50 kg =

Wrestling competitions

Women's freestyle 50 kg at the 2022 U23 World Championships
- Venue: Pontevedra Municipal Sports Hall
- Dates: 19–20 October
- Competitors: 22 from 22 nations

Medalists
gold medal	Yui Susaki	Japan
silver medal	Ankush Panghal	India
bronze medal	Nada Medani	Egypt
bronze medal	Sarra Hamdi	Tunisia

The women's freestyle 50 kilograms is a competition featured at the 2022 U23 World Wrestling Championships, and was held in Pontevedra, Spain on 19 and 20 October 2022. The qualification rounds were held on 19 October while medal matches were held on the 2nd day of the competition. A total of 22 wrestlers competed in this event, limited to athletes whose body weight was less than 50 kilograms.

This freestyle wrestling competition consists of a single-elimination tournament, with a repechage used to determine the winner of two bronze medals. The two finalists face off for gold and silver medals. Each wrestler who loses to one of the two finalists moves into the repechage, culminating in a pair of bronze medal matches featuring the semifinal losers each facing the remaining repechage opponent from their half of the bracket.

== Results ==
Legend

- F — Won by fall

=== Final ===
Final
Ankush Panghal (IND)	0
Yui Susaki (JPN)	4^{F}

=== Top half ===
Round of 32
Jiah Pingot (PHI)	4^{F}
Jekaterina Jermaļonoka (LAT)	6
Lisa Ersel (GER)	4
Amanda Tomczyk (POL)	3
Samantha Romano (CAN)	0
Snizhana Onufriieva (UKR)	10

Round of 16
Szimonetta Szekér (HUN)	7
María Cazalla (ESP)	0
Jiah Pingot (PHI)	2
Nada Medani (EGY)	5
Lin Yung-hsun (TPE)	0
Lisa Ersel (GER)	6
Snizhana Onufriieva (UKR)	0
Ankush Panghal (IND)	10

Quarterfinals
Szimonetta Szekér (HUN)	3
Nada Medani (EGY)	3
Lisa Ersel (GER)	0
Ankush Panghal (IND)	10

Semifinals
Nada Medani (EGY)	2
Ankush Panghal (IND)	8^{F}

=== Bottom half ===
Round of 32
Maria Leorda (MDA)	6
Emma Luttenauer (FRA)	12
Maral Tangirbergenova (KAZ)	0
Ştefania Priceputu (ROU)	3^{F}
Sarra Hamdi (TUN)	12
Svenja Jungo (SUI)	2

Round of 16
Emanuela Liuzzi (ITA)	5
Emma Luttenauer (FRA)	4
Ştefania Priceputu (ROU)	11
Zehra Demirhan (TUR)	2^{F}
Nyla Valencia (USA)	0
Sarra Hamdi (TUN)	3
Yui Susaki (JPN)	10^{F}
Shahana Nazarova (AZE)	0

Quarterfinals
Emanuela Liuzzi (ITA)	4
Zehra Demirhan (TUR)	2
Sarra Hamdi (TUN)	0
Yui Susaki (JPN)	10

Semifinals
Emanuela Liuzzi (ITA)	0
Yui Susaki (JPN)	10

=== Repechage ===
Repechage round 2
Snizhana Onufriieva (UKR)	0
Lisa Ersel (GER)	11
Shahana Nazarova (AZE)	1
Sarra Hamdi (TUN)	1

Bronze medals
Lisa Ersel (GER)	2
Nada Medani (EGY)	4
Sarra Hamdi (TUN)	8
Emanuela Liuzzi (ITA)	5

== Final standing ==
Rank	Athlete
1st place, gold medalist(s)	Yui Susaki (JPN)
2nd place, silver medalist(s)	Ankush Panghal (IND)
3rd place, bronze medalist(s)	Nada Medani (EGY)
3rd place, bronze medalist(s)	Sarra Hamdi (TUN)
5	Lisa Ersel (GER)
5	Emanuela Liuzzi (ITA)
7	Jiah Pingot (PHI)
8	Zehra Demirhan (TUR)
9	Ştefania Priceputu (ROU)
10	Snizhana Onufriieva (UKR)
11	Emma Luttenauer (FRA)
12	Szimonetta Szekér (HUN)
13	Maria Leorda (MDA)
14	Amanda Tomczyk (POL)
15	Svenja Jungo (SUI)
16	Shahana Nazarova (AZE)
17	Jekaterina Jermaļonoka (LAT)
18	Maral Tangirbergenova (KAZ)
19	Nyla Valencia (USA)
20	Lin Yung-hsun (TPE)
21	María Cazalla (ESP)
22	Samantha Romano (CAN)
