= 2016 European Juniors Wrestling Championships =

2016 Romania Wrestling Championships

- Host city: Bucharest, Romania
- Dates: June 21–26, 2016

Champions
- Freestyle: Russia
- Greco-Roman: Georgia
- Women: Russia

The 2016 European Juniors Wrestling Championships was held in Bucharest, Romania between June 21–26, 2016.

== Medal table ==
Rank	Nation	Gold	Silver	Bronze	Total
1	Russia	9	3	8	20
2	Azerbaijan	5	2	5	12
3	Georgia	3	4	6	13
4	Ukraine	1	3	3	7
5	Germany	1	2	2	5
6	France	1	2	0	3
7	Romania	1	1	1	3
8	Hungary	1	0	1	2
9	Moldova	1	0	0	1
9	Norway	1	0	0	1
11	Turkey	0	5	5	10
12	Belarus	0	1	4	5
13	Sweden	0	1	1	2
14	Armenia	0	0	3	3
14	Bulgaria	0	0	3	3
16	Italy	0	0	2	2
16	Poland	0	0	2	2
18	Croatia	0	0	1	1
18	Great Britain	0	0	1	1
Totals (19 entries)		24	24	48	96

== Team ranking ==
Rank	Men's freestyle		Men's Greco-Roman		Women's freestyle	
Rank	Team	Points	Team	Points	Team	Points
1	Russia	78	Georgia	53	Russia	68
2	Georgia	64	Russia	51	Germany	46
3	Azerbaijan	55	Ukraine	50	Belarus	45
4	Turkey	51	Azerbaijan	48	Turkey	44
5	Armenia	27	Turkey	43	Poland	36

== Medal summary ==
=== Men's freestyle ===
Event	Gold	Silver	Bronze
50 kg	(Russia) Georgii Okorokov	(Romania) Răzvan Kovacs	(Azerbaijan) Aliabbas Rzazade
50 kg	(Russia) Georgii Okorokov	(Romania) Răzvan Kovacs	(Ukraine) Kamil Kerymov
55 kg	(Russia) Abasgadzhi Magomedov	(Georgia (country)) Roberti Dingashvili	(Bulgaria) Mikyay Naim
55 kg	(Russia) Abasgadzhi Magomedov	(Georgia (country)) Roberti Dingashvili	(Azerbaijan) Mahir Amiraslanov
60 kg	(Russia) Uruzbek Tsomartov	(Turkey) Selim Kozan	(Georgia (country)) Shmagi Todua
60 kg	(Russia) Uruzbek Tsomartov	(Turkey) Selim Kozan	(United Kingdom) George Ramm
66 kg	(Russia) David Baev	(Turkey) Enes Uslu	(Georgia (country)) Giorgi Sulava
66 kg	(Russia) David Baev	(Turkey) Enes Uslu	(Hungary) Csaba Vida
74 kg	(Azerbaijan) Murad Suleymanov	(Russia) Zaurbek Sidakov	(Georgia (country)) Tariel Gaphrindashvili
74 kg	(Azerbaijan) Murad Suleymanov	(Russia) Zaurbek Sidakov	(Armenia) Tigran Mnatsakanyan
84 kg	(Azerbaijan) Gadzhimurad Magomedsaidov	(Russia) Batyrbek Tsakulov	(Armenia) Sargis Hovsepyan
84 kg	(Azerbaijan) Gadzhimurad Magomedsaidov	(Russia) Batyrbek Tsakulov	(Georgia (country)) Meki Simonia
96 kg	(Russia) Yuri Vlasko	(Georgia (country)) Givi Matcharashvili	(Turkey) Feyzullah Aktürk
96 kg	(Russia) Yuri Vlasko	(Georgia (country)) Givi Matcharashvili	(Azerbaijan) Magomedrasul Gazimagomedov
120 kg	(Russia) Magomedamin Dibirov	(Turkey) Hüseyin Civelek	(Azerbaijan) Alimagomed Alikhmaev
120 kg	(Russia) Magomedamin Dibirov	(Turkey) Hüseyin Civelek	(Georgia (country)) Zuriko Urtashvili

=== Men's Greco-Roman ===
Event	Gold	Silver	Bronze
50 kg	(Georgia (country)) Nugzari Tsurtsumia	(Azerbaijan) Azar Nasibli	(Italy) Giovanni Freni
50 kg	(Georgia (country)) Nugzari Tsurtsumia	(Azerbaijan) Azar Nasibli	(Belarus) Artsem Belausau
55 kg	(Azerbaijan) Nofal Babayev	(Ukraine) Zhora Abovian	(Georgia (country)) Dato Chkhartishvili
55 kg	(Azerbaijan) Nofal Babayev	(Ukraine) Zhora Abovian	(Russia) Artur Petrosian
60 kg	(Azerbaijan) Mikayil Rahmanov	(Georgia (country)) Levani Kavjaradze	(Armenia) Gevorg Khumaryan
60 kg	(Azerbaijan) Mikayil Rahmanov	(Georgia (country)) Levani Kavjaradze	(Germany) Etienne Kinsinger
66 kg	(Georgia (country)) Ramaz Zoidze	(Ukraine) Parviz Nasibov	(Bulgaria) Deyvid Dimitrov
66 kg	(Georgia (country)) Ramaz Zoidze	(Ukraine) Parviz Nasibov	(Azerbaijan) Sanan Suleymanov
74 kg	(Hungary) Zoltán Lévai	(Ukraine) Artem Matiash	(Turkey) Serkan Akkoyun
74 kg	(Hungary) Zoltán Lévai	(Ukraine) Artem Matiash	(Romania) George Mariea
84 kg	(Azerbaijan) Islam Abbasov	(Turkey) Ali Cengiz	(Russia) Vladislav Kulpa
84 kg	(Azerbaijan) Islam Abbasov	(Turkey) Ali Cengiz	(Croatia) Ivan Huklek
96 kg	(Russia) Ruslan Bekuzarov	(Georgia (country)) Giorgi Melia	(Ukraine) Vladen Kozliuk
96 kg	(Russia) Ruslan Bekuzarov	(Georgia (country)) Giorgi Melia	(Turkey) İbrahim Tıgcı
120 kg	(Georgia (country)) Zviadi Pataridze	(Russia) Nikolai Izmailov	(Turkey) Osman Yıldırım
120 kg	(Georgia (country)) Zviadi Pataridze	(Russia) Nikolai Izmailov	(Belarus) Pavel Rudakou

=== Women's freestyle ===
Event	Gold	Silver	Bronze
44 kg	(Ukraine) Oksana Livach	(Belarus) Kseniya Stankevich	(Poland) Beata Kosla
44 kg	(Ukraine) Oksana Livach	(Belarus) Kseniya Stankevich	(Russia) Veronika Gurskaya
48 kg	(Russia) Nadezhda Sokolova	(France) Félicia Gallo	(Germany) Annika Wendle
48 kg	(Russia) Nadezhda Sokolova	(France) Félicia Gallo	(Poland) Dominika Szynkowska
51 kg	(Germany) Elena Brugger	(France) Hilary Honorine	(Russia) Luiza Suleymanova
51 kg	(Germany) Elena Brugger	(France) Hilary Honorine	(Belarus) Fatsima Sidakova
55 kg	(Moldova) Anastasia Nichita	(Turkey) Elif Yanık	(Russia) Viktoriia Vaulina
55 kg	(Moldova) Anastasia Nichita	(Turkey) Elif Yanık	(Bulgaria) Bilyana Dudova
59 kg	(Norway) Grace Bullen	(Sweden) Emma Johansson	(Russia) Maria Matyushenko
59 kg	(Norway) Grace Bullen	(Sweden) Emma Johansson	(Italy) Arianna Carieri
63 kg	(Romania) Kriszta Incze	(Germany) Luzie Manzke	(Russia) Maria Kuznetsova
63 kg	(Romania) Kriszta Incze	(Germany) Luzie Manzke	(Sweden) Olivia Henningsson
67 kg	(France) Koumba Larroque	(Azerbaijan) Elis Manolova	(Ukraine) Yulia Lisovska
67 kg	(France) Koumba Larroque	(Azerbaijan) Elis Manolova	(Russia) Khanum Velieva
72 kg	(Russia) Daria Shisterova	(Germany) Francy Rädelt	(Turkey) Ayşegül Özbege
72 kg	(Russia) Daria Shisterova	(Germany) Francy Rädelt	(Belarus) Yauheniya Andreichykava

Preceded by 2015 Istanbul	European Juniors Wrestling Championships; 2016	Succeeded by 2017 Dortmund
