= 2016 World Junior Wrestling Championships =

- Host city: Mâcon, France
- Dates: August 30 - September 04, 2016

Champions
- Freestyle: Russia
- Greco-Roman: Georgia
- Women: Japan

The 2016 World Junior Wrestling Championships were the 40th edition of the World Junior Wrestling Championships and were held in Mâcon, France between 30 August and 4 September 2016.

== Medal table ==
Rank	Nation	Gold	Silver	Bronze	Total
1	Japan	6	1	1	8
2	Russia	4	4	6	14
3	Georgia	4	0	3	7
4	Azerbaijan	2	1	5	8
5	Iran	2	1	3	6
6	United States	2	0	6	8
7	Turkey	1	4	1	6
8	Kazakhstan	1	3	1	5
9	Kyrgyzstan	1	1	1	3
10	France	1	0	0	1
11	China	0	2	3	5
12	Belarus	0	2	2	4
13	Germany	0	2	1	3
14	Ukraine	0	1	3	4
15	Uzbekistan	0	1	1	2
16	Romania	0	1	0	1
17	Hungary	0	0	4	4
18	Armenia	0	0	2	2
19	Algeria	0	0	1	1
19	Bulgaria	0	0	1	1
19	Canada	0	0	1	1
19	Egypt	0	0	1	1
19	Turkmenistan	0	0	1	1
Totals (23 entries)		24	24	48	96

== Team ranking ==
Rank	Men's freestyle		Men's Greco-Roman		Women's freestyle	
Rank	Team	Points	Team	Points	Team	Points
1	Russia	66	Georgia	51	Japan	61
2	Azerbaijan	49	Russia	40	China	54
3	Turkey	43	Iran	34	Ukraine	46
4	Iran	37	Kyrgyzstan	32	Russia	45
5	United States	36	Kazakhstan	31	Kazakhstan	35

== Medal summary ==
=== Men's freestyle ===
Event	Gold	Silver	Bronze
50 kg	(United States) Spencer Lee	(Kyrgyzstan) Khurshid Parpiev	(Azerbaijan) Aliabbas Rzazade
50 kg	(United States) Spencer Lee	(Kyrgyzstan) Khurshid Parpiev	(Kazakhstan) Yerbulan Sarkytbayev
55 kg	(Azerbaijan) Afgan Khashalov	(Russia) Khasankhusein Badrudinov	(United States) Daton Fix
55 kg	(Azerbaijan) Afgan Khashalov	(Russia) Khasankhusein Badrudinov	(Uzbekistan) Gulomjon Abdullaev
60 kg	(Iran) Peima Biabani	(Turkey) Selim Kozan	(Georgia (country)) Shmagi Todua
60 kg	(Iran) Peima Biabani	(Turkey) Selim Kozan	(Russia) Kezhik Chymba
66 kg	(Turkey) Enes Uslu	(Russia) Akhmed Usmanov	(Japan) Yuhi Fujinami
66 kg	(Turkey) Enes Uslu	(Russia) Akhmed Usmanov	(Azerbaijan) Orkhan Abasov
74 kg	(United States) Mark Hall	(Iran) Ahmad Bazrighalen	(Georgia (country)) Tariel Gaphrindashvili
74 kg	(United States) Mark Hall	(Iran) Ahmad Bazrighalen	(Russia) Nikita Suchkov
84 kg	(Russia) Arsen-Ali Musalaliev	(Turkey) Osman Göçen	(Azerbaijan) Gadzhimurad Magomedsaidov
84 kg	(Russia) Arsen-Ali Musalaliev	(Turkey) Osman Göçen	(Belarus) Dzianis Khramiankou
96 kg	(Iran) Hossein Shahbazigazvar	(Germany) Erik Thiele	(Russia) Znaur Kotciev
96 kg	(Iran) Hossein Shahbazigazvar	(Germany) Erik Thiele	(Hungary) Kristof Wittmann
120 kg	(Russia) Kazbek Khubulov	(Azerbaijan) Umar Israilov	(Iran) Amir Amiri
120 kg	(Russia) Kazbek Khubulov	(Azerbaijan) Umar Israilov	(Turkey) Hüseyin Civelek

=== Men's Greco-Roman ===
Event	Gold	Silver	Bronze
50 kg	(Russia) Vladislav Melnikov	(Uzbekistan) Ilkhom Bakhromov	(Armenia) Sergey Simonyan
50 kg	(Russia) Vladislav Melnikov	(Uzbekistan) Ilkhom Bakhromov	(Georgia (country)) Nugzari Tsurtsumia
55 kg	(Georgia (country)) Dato Chkhartishvili	(Japan) Yo Namba	(Iran) Meysam Dalkhani
55 kg	(Georgia (country)) Dato Chkhartishvili	(Japan) Yo Namba	(Kyrgyzstan) Nuzupbek Topchubaev
60 kg	(Kyrgyzstan) Kaly Sulaimanov	(Germany) Etienne Kinsinger	(Turkmenistan) Seydylla Tazayev
60 kg	(Kyrgyzstan) Kaly Sulaimanov	(Germany) Etienne Kinsinger	(United States) Taylor LaMont
66 kg	(Georgia (country)) Ramaz Zoidze	(Kazakhstan) Kaharman Kissymetov	(Egypt) Mohamed Ibrahim El-Sayed
66 kg	(Georgia (country)) Ramaz Zoidze	(Kazakhstan) Kaharman Kissymetov	(Azerbaijan) Islambek Dadov
74 kg	(Kazakhstan) Tamerlan Shadukayev	(Romania) George Mariea	(Russia) Akhmed Kaytsukov
74 kg	(Kazakhstan) Tamerlan Shadukayev	(Romania) George Mariea	(Hungary) Zoltán Lévai
84 kg	(Azerbaijan) Islam Abbasov	(Turkey) Ali Cengiz	(Algeria) Bachir Sid Azara
84 kg	(Azerbaijan) Islam Abbasov	(Turkey) Ali Cengiz	(Iran) Arman Abdevali
96 kg	(Georgia (country)) Giorgi Melia	(Belarus) Bopembe Sychev	(Russia) Ruslan Bekuzarov
96 kg	(Georgia (country)) Giorgi Melia	(Belarus) Bopembe Sychev	(United States) G'Angelo Hancock
120 kg	(Georgia (country)) Zviadi Pataridze	(Turkey) Osman Yıldırım	(Armenia) Edgar Khachatryan
120 kg	(Georgia (country)) Zviadi Pataridze	(Turkey) Osman Yıldırım	(Hungary) Ferenc Almasi

=== Women's freestyle ===
Event	Gold	Silver	Bronze
44 kg	(Japan) Miyu Nakamura	(Kazakhstan) Svetlana Ankicheva	(Ukraine) Oksana Livach
44 kg	(Japan) Miyu Nakamura	(Kazakhstan) Svetlana Ankicheva	(Russia) Veronika Gurskaya
48 kg	(Japan) Miho Igarashi	(Russia) Nadezhda Sokolova	(Canada) Jade Dufour
48 kg	(Japan) Miho Igarashi	(Russia) Nadezhda Sokolova	(Bulgaria) Miglena Selishka
51 kg	(Russia) Ksenia Nezgovorova	(China) Xuejiao Liao	(Ukraine) Khrystyna Bereza
51 kg	(Russia) Ksenia Nezgovorova	(China) Xuejiao Liao	(Germany) Elena Brugger
55 kg	(Japan) Mayu Mukaida	(Kazakhstan) Marina Sedneva	(Ukraine) Olena Kremzer
55 kg	(Japan) Mayu Mukaida	(Kazakhstan) Marina Sedneva	(Hungary) Ramóna Galambos
59 kg	(Japan) Yuzuru Kumano	(Ukraine) Anhelina Lysak	(China) Xingru Pei
59 kg	(Japan) Yuzuru Kumano	(Ukraine) Anhelina Lysak	(United States) Kayla Miracle
63 kg	(Japan) Ayana Gempei	(Belarus) Nade Dragunova	(United States) Maya Nelson
63 kg	(Japan) Ayana Gempei	(Belarus) Nade Dragunova	(China) Hongli Yan
67 kg	(France) Koumba Larroque	(China) Yue Han	(Azerbaijan) Elis Manolova
67 kg	(France) Koumba Larroque	(China) Yue Han	(United States) Alexis Porter
72 kg	(Japan) Masako Furuichi	(Russia) Daria Shisterova	(China) Chuchu Yan
72 kg	(Japan) Masako Furuichi	(Russia) Daria Shisterova	(Belarus) Yauheniya Andreichykava
