= 2021 U23 World Wrestling Championships – Women's freestyle 50 kg =

The women's freestyle 50 kilograms is a competition featured at the 2021 U23 World Wrestling Championships, and was held in Belgrade, Serbia on 3 and 4 November.

== Medalists ==
Gold	Emily Shilson; United States
Silver	Shivani Pawar; India
Bronze	Maria Tiumerekova; Russia
Bronze	Ştefania Priceputu; Romania

== Results ==
Legend

- F — Won by fall
- WO — Won by walkover

=== Main bracket ===
Round of 16
Anastasiya Yanotava (BLR)	9
Shivani Pawar (IND)	4^{F}
Tetiana Profatilova (UKR)	9
Maria Leorda (MDA)	6
Ştefania Priceputu (ROU)	6^{F}
Gulzhazira Amantayeva (KAZ)	1
Emily Shilson (USA)	10
Lisa Ersel (GER)	0
Shahana Nazarova (AZE)	3
Lin Yung-hsun (TPE)	5
Sarra Hamdi (TUN)	6
Aynur Erge (TUR)	0

Quarterfinals
Samantha Romano (CAN)	0
Maria Tiumerekova (RUS)	10
Shivani Pawar (IND)	13
Tetiana Profatilova (UKR)	6
Ştefania Priceputu (ROU)	0
Emily Shilson (USA)	4^{F}
Lin Yung-hsun (TPE)	0
Sarra Hamdi (TUN)	7^{F}

Semifinals
Maria Tiumerekova (RUS)	4
Shivani Pawar (IND)	4^{F}
Emily Shilson (USA)	WO
Sarra Hamdi (TUN)

Final
Shivani Pawar (IND)	2
Emily Shilson (USA)	4^{F}

=== Repechage ===
Repechage round 1
Anastasiya Yanotava (BLR)	11
Tetiana Profatilova (UKR)	2
Lisa Ersel (GER)	2
Ştefania Priceputu (ROU)	7

Bronze medals
Anastasiya Yanotava (BLR)	0
Maria Tiumerekova (RUS)	10
Ştefania Priceputu (ROU)	2
Sarra Hamdi (TUN)	1
