= 2025 European Wrestling Championships – Women's freestyle 50 kg =

Wrestling competition

Women's freestyle 50 kg at the 2025 European Wrestling Championships
- Venue: X-Bionic Sphere
- Location: Bratislava, Slovakia
- Dates: 9-10 April
- Competitors: 11

Medalists
gold medal	Oksana Livach	Ukraine
silver medal	Evin Demirhan Yavuz	Turkey
bronze medal	Nadezhda Sokolova
bronze medal	Natallia Varakina

The women's freestyle 50 kg is a competition featured at the 2025 European Wrestling Championships, and was held in Bratislava, Slovakia on April 9 and 10.

== Results ==
Legend

- F — Won by fall
- R — Retired

=== Main bracket ===
Round of 16
Ana Torres (ESP)	0
Emma Luttenauer (FRA)	11
Agata Walerzak (POL)	2
Natallia Varakina (UWW)	6
Alina Vuc (ROU)	10
Maria Leorda (MDA)	0

Quarterfinals
Oksana Livach (UKR)	7
Emma Luttenauer (FRA)	0
Svenja Jungo (SUI)	0
Nadezhda Sokolova (UWW)	10
Evin Demirhan Yavuz (TUR)	7
Natallia Varakina (UWW)	0
Alina Vuc (ROU)	5
Gabija Dilytė (LTU)	2

Semifinals
Oksana Livach (UKR)	3
Nadezhda Sokolova (UWW)	1
Evin Demirhan Yavuz (TUR)	7
Alina Vuc (ROU)	5^{R}

Final
Oksana Livach (UKR)	8
Evin Demirhan Yavuz (TUR)	0

=== Repechage ===
Bronze medal match
Emma Luttenauer (FRA)	1
Nadezhda Sokolova (UWW)	11
Natallia Varakina (UWW)	4
Alina Vuc (ROU)	1

== Final standing ==
Rank	Athlete
1st place, gold medalist(s)	Oksana Livach (UKR)
2nd place, silver medalist(s)	Evin Demirhan Yavuz (TUR)
3rd place, bronze medalist(s)	Nadezhda Sokolova (UWW)
3rd place, bronze medalist(s)	Natallia Varakina (UWW)
5	Emma Luttenauer (FRA)
5	Alina Vuc (ROU)
7	Gabija Dilytė (LTU)
8	Agata Walerzak (POL)
9	Svenja Jungo (SUI)
10	Maria Leorda (MDA)
11	Ana Torres (ESP)
