= 2018 U23 World Wrestling Championships =

- Host city: Bucharest, Romania
- Dates: November 12–18
- Stadium: Polyvalent Hall (Bucharest)

Champions
- Freestyle: Russia
- Greco-Roman: Georgia
- Women: Japan

The 2018 U23 World Wrestling Championships were the second edition of U23 World Wrestling Championships of combined events, held from November 12 to 18 in Bucharest, Romania.

== Medal table ==
Rank	Nation	Gold	Silver	Bronze	Total
1	Japan	9	2	2	13
2	Georgia	6	1	2	9
3	Russia	3	7	8	18
4	Turkey	2	2	3	7
5	Azerbaijan	1	4	2	7
6	China	1	2	3	6
7	Ukraine	1	1	6	8
8	Moldova	1	1	1	3
9	Cuba	1	1	0	2
10	Iran	1	0	8	9
11	Egypt	1	0	1	2
12	Canada	1	0	0	1
12	Norway	1	0	0	1
12	Slovakia	1	0	0	1
15	Romania	0	3	5	8
16	United States	0	3	2	5
17	Hungary	0	1	2	3
18	Denmark	0	1	0	1
18	India	0	1	0	1
20	Kazakhstan	0	0	5	5
21	Mongolia	0	0	4	4
22	Belarus	0	0	2	2
22	Germany	0	0	2	2
24	Kyrgyzstan	0	0	1	1
24	Turkmenistan	0	0	1	1
Totals (25 entries)		30	30	60	120

== Team ranking ==
Rank	Men's freestyle		Men's Greco-Roman		Women's freestyle	
Rank	Team	Points	Team	Points	Team	Points
1	Russia	181	Georgia	126	Japan	188
2	Georgia	108	Russia	101	Russia	113
3	Iran	105	Turkey	87	China	106
4	Japan	93	Japan	80	Ukraine	81
5	United States	92	Azerbaijan	71	United States	76
6	Ukraine	70	Iran	70	Mongolia	75
7	Azerbaijan	62	Egypt	62	Romania	70
8	Romania	52	Hungary	62	Kazakhstan	65
9	Turkey	43	Ukraine	56	Canada	55
10	India	42	Moldova	45	Germany	52

== Medal summary ==
=== Men's freestyle ===
Event	Gold	Silver	Bronze
57 kg	Toshihiro Hasegawa; Japan	Ravi Kumar; India	Taras Markovych; Ukraine
57 kg	Toshihiro Hasegawa; Japan	Ravi Kumar; India	Zou Wanhao; China
61 kg	Magomedrasul Idrisov; Russia	Sean Christian Fausz; United States	Nikolai Okhlopkov; Romania
61 kg	Magomedrasul Idrisov; Russia	Sean Christian Fausz; United States	Liu Minghu; China
65 kg	Rei Higuchi; Japan	Ali Rahimzade; Azerbaijan	Maxim Sacultan; Moldova
65 kg	Rei Higuchi; Japan	Ali Rahimzade; Azerbaijan	Islam Dudaev; Russia
70 kg	Tajmuraz Salkazanov; Slovakia	David Baev; Russia	Jintaro Motoyama; Japan
70 kg	Tajmuraz Salkazanov; Slovakia	David Baev; Russia	Enes Uslu; Turkey
74 kg	Avtandil Kentchadze; Georgia	Maxim Vasilioglo; Romania	Navid Zanganeh; Iran
74 kg	Avtandil Kentchadze; Georgia	Maxim Vasilioglo; Romania	Timur Bizhoev; Russia
79 kg	Nika Kentchadze; Georgia	Gadzhi Nabiev; Russia	Omaraskhab Nazhmudinov; Romania
79 kg	Nika Kentchadze; Georgia	Gadzhi Nabiev; Russia	Döwletmyrat Orazgylyjow; Turkmenistan
86 kg	Kamran Ghasempour; Iran	Artur Naifonov; Russia	Gankhuyag Ganbaatar; Mongolia
86 kg	Kamran Ghasempour; Iran	Artur Naifonov; Russia	Murad Suleymanov; Azerbaijan
92 kg	Shamil Zubairov; Azerbaijan	Aslanbek Sotiev; Russia	Hossein Shahbazi; Iran
92 kg	Shamil Zubairov; Azerbaijan	Aslanbek Sotiev; Russia	Bohdan Hrytsay; Ukraine
97 kg	Givi Matcharashvili; Georgia	Kollin Moore; United States	Ali Shabani; Iran
97 kg	Givi Matcharashvili; Georgia	Kollin Moore; United States	Igor Ovsyannikov; Russia
125 kg	Said Gamidov; Russia	Youssif Hemida; United States	Rolandi Andriadze; Georgia
125 kg	Said Gamidov; Russia	Youssif Hemida; United States	Amin Taheri; Iran

=== Men's Greco-Roman ===
Event	Gold	Silver	Bronze
55 kg	Nugzari Tsurtsumia; Georgia	Vitalii Kabaloev; Russia	Balbai Dordokov; Kyrgyzstan
55 kg	Nugzari Tsurtsumia; Georgia	Vitalii Kabaloev; Russia	Amangali Bekbolatov; Kazakhstan
60 kg	Kenichiro Fumita; Japan	Murad Mammadov; Azerbaijan	Mehdi Mohsennejad; Iran
60 kg	Kenichiro Fumita; Japan	Murad Mammadov; Azerbaijan	Kerem Kamal; Turkey
63 kg	Katsuaki Endo; Japan	Alexandru Biciu; Moldova	Mihai Mihuț; Romania
63 kg	Katsuaki Endo; Japan	Alexandru Biciu; Moldova	Oleksandr Hrushyn; Ukraine
67 kg	Mohamed Ibrahim El-Sayed; Egypt	Karim Jafarov; Azerbaijan	Alen Mirzoian; Russia
67 kg	Mohamed Ibrahim El-Sayed; Egypt	Karim Jafarov; Azerbaijan	Ottó Losonczi; Hungary
72 kg	Cengiz Arslan; Turkey	Ramaz Zoidze; Georgia	Tamás Lévai; Hungary
72 kg	Cengiz Arslan; Turkey	Ramaz Zoidze; Georgia	Kaharman Kissymetov; Kazakhstan
77 kg	Daniel Cataraga; Moldova	Rajbek Bisultanov; Denmark	Ismail Saidkhasanov; Russia
77 kg	Daniel Cataraga; Moldova	Rajbek Bisultanov; Denmark	Fatih Cengiz; Turkey
82 kg	Gela Bolkvadze; Georgia	Nicu Ojog; Romania	Mikita Klimovich; Belarus
82 kg	Gela Bolkvadze; Georgia	Nicu Ojog; Romania	Mehdi Ebrahimi; Iran
87 kg	Semen Novikov; Ukraine	Daniel Grégorich; Cuba	Islam Abbasov; Azerbaijan
87 kg	Semen Novikov; Ukraine	Daniel Grégorich; Cuba	Anton Kurs; Belarus
97 kg	Aleksandr Golovin; Russia	Zsolt Török; Hungary	Ali Akbar Heidari; Iran
97 kg	Aleksandr Golovin; Russia	Zsolt Török; Hungary	Giorgi Melia; Georgia
130 kg	Zviadi Pataridze; Georgia	Osman Yıldırım; Turkey	Ali Akbar Yousefi; Iran
130 kg	Zviadi Pataridze; Georgia	Osman Yıldırım; Turkey	Abdellatif Mohamed; Egypt

=== Women's freestyle ===
Event	Gold	Silver	Bronze
50 kg	Miho Igarashi; Japan	Nadezhda Sokolova; Russia	Ştefania Priceputu; Romania
50 kg	Miho Igarashi; Japan	Nadezhda Sokolova; Russia	Tsogt-Ochiryn Namuuntsetseg; Mongolia
53 kg	Momoka Kadoya; Japan	Milana Dadasheva; Russia	Andreea Ana; Romania
53 kg	Momoka Kadoya; Japan	Milana Dadasheva; Russia	Khrystyna Bereza; Ukraine
55 kg	Saki Igarashi; Japan	Ouyang Junling; China	Elena Brugger; Germany
55 kg	Saki Igarashi; Japan	Ouyang Junling; China	Marina Sedneva; Kazakhstan
57 kg	Alexandria Town; Canada	Akie Hanai; Japan	Sükheegiin Tserenchimed; Mongolia
57 kg	Alexandria Town; Canada	Akie Hanai; Japan	Alexandra Andreeva; Russia
59 kg	Grace Bullen; Norway	Rong Ningning; China	Olena Kremzer; Ukraine
59 kg	Grace Bullen; Norway	Rong Ningning; China	Yuzuru Kumano; Japan
62 kg	Yukako Kawai; Japan	Ilona Prokopevniuk; Ukraine	Enkhbatyn Gantuyaa; Mongolia
62 kg	Yukako Kawai; Japan	Ilona Prokopevniuk; Ukraine	Luisa Niemesch; Germany
65 kg	Ayana Gempei; Japan	Elis Manolova; Azerbaijan	Maria Kuznetsova; Russia
65 kg	Ayana Gempei; Japan	Elis Manolova; Azerbaijan	Iryna Koliadenko; Ukraine
68 kg	Yudaris Sánchez; Cuba	Miwa Morikawa; Japan	Khanum Velieva; Russia
68 kg	Yudaris Sánchez; Cuba	Miwa Morikawa; Japan	Alexandria Glaudé; United States
72 kg	Buse Tosun; Turkey	Alexandra Anghel; Romania	Zhamila Bakbergenova; Kazakhstan
72 kg	Buse Tosun; Turkey	Alexandra Anghel; Romania	Wang Xiaoqian; China
76 kg	Paliha; China	Ayşegül Özbege; Turkey	Korinahe Bullock; United States
76 kg	Paliha; China	Ayşegül Özbege; Turkey	Gulmaral Yerkebayeva; Kazakhstan
