= Enes Uslu =

Turkish freestyle wrestler

Personal information
- Born: 1 January 1996 (age 30) Bursa, Turkey

Sport
- Country: Turkey
- Sport: Amateur wrestling
- Event: Freestyle
- Club: Bursa Büyükşehir Belediyesi S.K.
Medal record
Representing Turkey
Men's Greco-Roman wrestling
World Military Championships
Bronze medal – third place	2023 Baku	72 kg
Men's freestyle wrestling
World U23 Championships
Bronze medal – third place	2018 Bucharest	70 kg
European U23 Championship
Silver medal – second place	2018 Istanbul	70 kg
World Juniors Championships
Gold medal – first place	2016 Macon	66 kg
European Juniors Championships
Gold medal – first place	2015 Istanbul	66 kg
Silver medal – second place	2016 Bucharest	66 kg

Enes Uslu (born 1 January 1996) is a Turkish freestyle wrestler competing in the 74 kg division. He is a member of Bursa Büyükşehir Belediyesi S.K.

== Career ==
In 2016, he won the gold medal in the men's 66 kg event at the 2016 World Juniors Wrestling Championship held in Macon, France.

In 2018, he won the silver medal in the men's 70 kg event at the 2018 European U23 Wrestling Championship held in İstanbul, Turkey.
