= 2024 European Wrestling Championships – Women's freestyle 50 kg =

Wrestling competition

Women's freestyle 50 kg at the 2024 European Wrestling Championships
- Venue: Polyvalent Hall
- Location: Bucharest, Romania
- Dates: 14-15 February
- Competitors: 14

Medalists
gold medal	Mariya Stadnik	Azerbaijan
silver medal	Evin Demirhan Yavuz	Turkey
bronze medal	Miglena Selishka	Bulgaria
bronze medal	Milana Dadasheva	Individual Neutral Athletes

The women's freestyle 50 kg is a competition featured at the 2024 European Wrestling Championships, and held in Bucharest, Romania on February 14 and 15.

== Results ==
Legend

- F — Won by fall

=== Main bracket ===
Round of 16
Ainztane Gorria (ESP)	2
Ana Maria Pîrvu (ROU)	4
Emanuela Liuzzi (ITA)	2
Gabija Dilytė (LTU)	1
Khrystyna Basych (SVK)	0
Miglena Selishka (BUL)	10
Anna Łukasiak (POL)	1
Oksana Livach (UKR)	4
Viyaleta Chyryk (AIN)	6
Maria Leorda (MDA)	0
Emma Luttenauer (FRA)	2
Milana Dadasheva (AIN)	12

Quarterfinals
Evin Demirhan Yavuz (TUR)	4^{F}
Ana Maria Pîrvu (ROU)	2
Emanuela Liuzzi (ITA)	2
Miglena Selishka (BUL)	4
Oksana Livach (UKR)	5
Viyaleta Chyryk (AIN)	0
Milana Dadasheva (AIN)	0
Mariya Stadnik (AZE)	11

Semifinals
Evin Demirhan Yavuz (TUR)	4
Miglena Selishka (BUL)	3
Oksana Livach (UKR)	0
Mariya Stadnik (AZE)	6

Final
Evin Demirhan Yavuz (TUR)	0
Mariya Stadnik (AZE)	10^{F}

=== Repechage ===
Bronze medal match
Ana Maria Pîrvu (ROU)	0
Miglena Selishka (BUL)	10
Milana Dadasheva (AIN)	17
Oksana Livach (UKR)	15

== Final standing ==
Rank	Athlete
1st place, gold medalist(s)	Mariya Stadnik (AZE)
2nd place, silver medalist(s)	Evin Demirhan Yavuz (TUR)
3rd place, bronze medalist(s)	Miglena Selishka (BUL)
3rd place, bronze medalist(s)	Milana Dadasheva (AIN)
5	Ana Maria Pîrvu (ROU)
5	Oksana Livach (UKR)
7	Emanuela Liuzzi (ITA)
8	Viyaleta Chyryk (AIN)
9	Ainztane Gorria (ESP)
10	Emma Luttenauer (FRA)
11	Gabija Dilytė (LTU)
12	Anna Łukasiak (POL)
13	Maria Leorda (MDA)
14	Khrystyna Basych (SVK)
