= Ekaterina Poleshchuk =

Russian freestyle wrestler

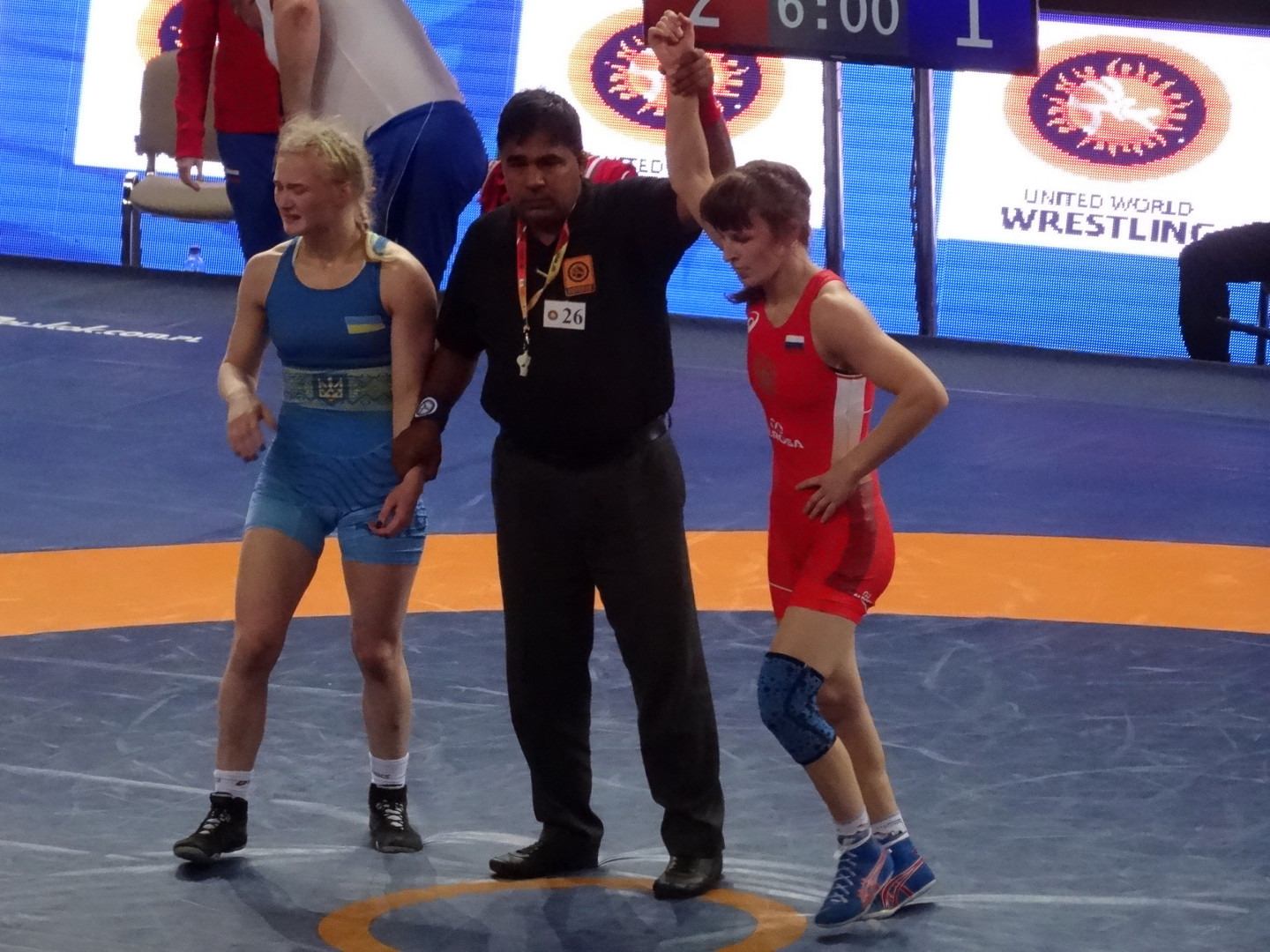
- Ekaterina in red

Personal information
- Native name: Екатерина Полещук
- National team: Russia
- Born: 24 March 1994 (age 32) Gulkevichi, Krasnodar Krai, Russia

Sport
- Country: Russia
- Sport: Amateur wrestling
- Rank: International master of sports in freestyle wrestling
- Event: Freestyle
- Club: Minobrnauka WC
- Coached by: Ruslan Painov, Maksim Lameshin
Medal record
Women's freestyle wrestling
Representing Individual Neutral Athletes
Dan Kolov & Nikola Petrov Tournament
Gold medal – first place	2024 Sofia	53 kg
Representing Russia
World Championships
Bronze medal – third place	2019 Nur-Sultan	50 kg
European Championships
Bronze medal – third place	2021 Warsaw	50 kg
Individual World Cup
Gold medal – first place	2020 Belgrade	50 kg
Golden Grand Prix Ivan Yarygin
Bronze medal – third place	2017 Krasnoyarsk	53 kg
Bronze medal – third place	2018 Krasnoyarsk	53 kg
Silver medal – second place	2023 Krasnoyarsk	53 kg
World U23 Championships
Bronze medal – third place	2017 Bydgoszcz	53 kg

Ekaterina Igorevna Poleshchuk (Russian: Екатерина Игоревна Полещук; born 24 March 1994) is a Russian freestyle wrestler. She is a bronze medalist at the World Wrestling Championships and the European Wrestling Championships.

== Career ==
Poleshchuk won one of the bronze medals in the women's 53 kg event at the Golden Grand Prix Ivan Yarygin 2017 and Golden Grand Prix Ivan Yarygin 2018 held in Krasnoyarsk, Russia. She also won one of the bronze medals in this event at the 2017 U23 World Wrestling Championships held in Bydgoszcz, Poland.

In 2019, Poleshchuk won a bronze medal in the women's 50 kg event at the World Wrestling Championships held in Nur-Sultan, Kazakhstan. She defeated Sun Yanan of China in her bronze medal match.

In 2020, Poleshchuk won the gold medal in the women's 50 kg event at the Individual Wrestling World Cup held in Belgrade, Serbia. In 2021, she won one of the bronze medals in the 50 kg event at the European Wrestling Championships held in Warsaw, Poland.

She competed in the women's 59 kg event at the 2024 European Wrestling Championships held in Bucharest, Romania. She was eliminated in her second match by Patrycja Gil of Poland.

== Achievements ==
Year	Tournament	Location	Result	Event
2019	World Championships	Nur-Sultan, Kazakhstan	3rd	Freestyle 50 kg
2020	Individual Wrestling World Cup	Belgrade, Serbia	1st	Freestyle 50 kg
2021	European Championships	Warsaw, Poland	3rd	Freestyle 50 kg
