= Ilona Semkiv =

Ukrainian freestyle wrestler

Personal information
- Native name: Ілона Володимирівна Семків
- Born: 21 September 1994 (age 31)
Medal record
Women's freestyle wrestling
Representing Ukraine
European Championships
Silver medal – second place	2017 Novi Sad	48 kg

Ilona Semkiv (Ukrainian: Ілона Володимирівна Семків; born 21 September 1994) is a Ukrainian freestyle wrestler. She is a member of Ukrainian national team.

== Career ==
Semkiv won silver medal at the 2017 European Championships in Novi Sad, Serbia. She lost in the final to ex-Ukrainian Mariya Stadnyk from Azerbaijan.
