= Sarra Hamdi =

Tunisian freestyle wrestler

Personal information
- Born: 13 March 1999 (age 27)

Sport
- Country: Tunisia
- Sport: Amateur wrestling
- Weight class: 50 kg
- Event: Freestyle
Medal record
Women's freestyle wrestling
Representing Tunisia
African Games
Silver medal – second place	2019 Rabat	50 kg
African Championships
Gold medal – first place	2022 El Jadida	50 kg
Silver medal – second place	2017 Marrakesh	48 kg
Silver medal – second place	2019 Hammamet	53 kg
Bronze medal – third place	2018 Port Harcourt	50 kg
Bronze medal – third place	2020 Algiers	50 kg
Islamic Solidarity Games
Bronze medal – third place	2021 Konya	50 kg
Mediterranean Games
Bronze medal – third place	2022 Oran	50 kg
World U23 Championships
Bronze medal – third place	2022 Pontevedra	50 kg

Sarra Hamdi (born 13 March 1999) is a Tunisian freestyle wrestler. She is a silver medalist at the African Games and a five-time medalist, including gold, at the African Wrestling Championships. She competed at the 2020 Summer Olympics, in the women's 50 kg event.

== Career ==
She represented Tunisia at the 2019 African Games and she won the silver medal in the women's freestyle 50 kg event.

In 2020, she won one of the bronze medals in the women's freestyle 50 kg event at the African Wrestling Championships held in Algiers, Algeria. She qualified at the 2021 African & Oceania Wrestling Olympic Qualification Tournament to represent Tunisia at the 2020 Summer Olympics in Tokyo, Japan.

In 2022, she competed in the 50 kg event at the Yasar Dogu Tournament held in Istanbul, Turkey. She won the gold medal in her event at the 2022 African Wrestling Championships held in El Jadida, Morocco. A few months later, she won the bronze medal in the 50 kg event at the 2022 Mediterranean Games held in Oran, Algeria. She also won the bronze medal in the 50 kg event at the 2021 Islamic Solidarity Games held in Konya, Turkey.

== Achievements ==
Year	Tournament	Location	Result	Event
2017	African Wrestling Championships	Marrakesh, Morocco	2nd	Freestyle 48 kg
2018	African Wrestling Championships	Port Harcourt, Nigeria	3rd	Freestyle 50 kg
2019	African Wrestling Championships	Hammamet, Tunisia	2nd	Freestyle 53 kg
2019	African Games	Rabat, Morocco	2nd	Freestyle 50 kg
2020	African Wrestling Championships	Algiers, Algeria	3rd	Freestyle 50 kg
2022	African Wrestling Championships	El Jadida, Morocco	1st	Freestyle 50 kg
2022	Mediterranean Games	Oran, Algeria	3rd	Freestyle 50 kg
2022	Islamic Solidarity Games	Konya, Turkey	3rd	Freestyle 50 kg
