= Milana Dadasheva =

Russian freestyle wrestler

Personal information
- Native name: Милана Камилхановна Дадашева
- Full name: Milana Kamilkhanovna Dadasheva
- Born: 20 February 1995 (age 31) Izberbash, Dagestan, Russia
- Height: 1.67 m (5 ft 6 in)
- Weight: 50 kg (110 lb; 7.9 st)

Sport
- Country: Russia
- Sport: Women's freestyle wrestling
- Event: 50 kg
- Coached by: Kasum Nasrudinov, Sergey Grachev
Medal record
Women's freestyle wrestling
Representing Individual Neutral Athletes
European Championships
Bronze medal – third place	2024 Bucharest	50 kg
Representing Russian Wrestling Federation
Yasar Dogu Tournament
Silver medal – second place	2022 Istanbul	53 kg
Representing Russia
European Championships
Bronze medal – third place	2018 Kaspiysk	50 kg
Bronze medal – third place	2020 Rome	50 kg
Military World Games
Bronze medal – third place	2019 Wuhan	53 kg
World University Championship
Gold medal – first place	2016 Çorum	69 kg
World Military Championships
Bronze medal – third place	2018 Moscow	53 kg
Russian Championships
Gold medal – first place	2016 Saint Petersburg	48 kg
Gold medal – first place	2022 Naro-Fominsk	53 kg
Yasar Dogu Tournament
Gold medal – first place	2017 Istanbul	48 kg
Golden Grand Prix Ivan Yarygin
Bronze medal – third place	2017 Krasnoyarsk	48 kg
Dan Kolov - Nikola Petrov Tournament
Silver medal – second place	2018 Sofia	50 kg
Grand Prix
Gold medal – first place	2018 Minsk	53 kg
Bronze medal – third place	2013 Dormagen	48 kg
Bronze medal – third place	2016 Paris	48 kg
U23 World Championships
Silver medal – second place	2018 Bucharest	53 kg
U23 European Championships
Bronze medal – third place	2016 Russe	48 kg
Junior World Championships
Bronze medal – third place	2014 Zagreb	48 kg
Bronze medal – third place	2015 Salvador	48 kg
Junior European Championships
Gold medal – first place	2015 Istanbul	48 kg
Bronze medal – third place	2012 Zagreb	48 kg

Milana Dadasheva (Russian: Милана Камилхановна Дадашева; born 20 February 1995 in Dagestan) is a Russian freestyle wrestler of Kumyk descent, senior 2016 and 2022 Russian national champion, two time junior world championships bronze medalist.

== Career ==
Dadasheva competed at the 2016 Olympics in the Women's freestyle 48 kg, Dadasheva beat Kim Hyon-gyong of North Korea in the qualification, but she was eliminated by the eventual bronze medalist Elitsa Yankova of Bulgaria in the round of 16. In 2018, she was runner-up at the U23 World Championships at 53 kilos.

She won one of the bronze medals in the women's 50 kg event at the 2024 European Wrestling Championships held in Bucharest, Romania. She defeated Oksana Livach of Ukraine in her bronze medal match.

== Other awards and honors ==
International Freestyle:

- 2012, 2015 Junior European championships 3rd - 48 kg.
- 2014, 2015 Junior world championships 3rd - 48 kg.
- 2016 Grand Prix Paris 3rd - 48 kg.
- 2016 U23 European championships 3rd - 48 kg.
- 2016 Summer Olympics 11th - 48 kg.
- 2017 Ivan Yarygin GP 3rd - 48 kg.
- 2017 Yasar Dogu International 1st - 48 kg.
- 2018 U23 World Championship 2nd - 53 kg.
- 2024 European Championships 3rd - 50 kg.
