= Miglena Selishka =

Bulgarian freestyle wrestler (born 1996)

Personal information
- Native name: Миглена Селишка
- Full name: Miglena Georgieva Selishka
- Nationality: Bulgaria
- Born: 13 February 1996 (age 30) Dupnitsa, Bulgaria
- Height: 155 cm (5 ft 1 in)

Sport
- Country: Bulgaria
- Sport: Amateur wrestling
- Weight class: 50 kg
- Event: Freestyle
- Club: CSKA Sofia
Medal record
Women's freestyle wrestling
Representing Bulgaria
Individual World Cup
Bronze medal – third place	2020 Belgrade	50 kg
European Games
Bronze medal – third place	2019 Minsk	50 kg
European Championships
Gold medal – first place	2020 Rome	50 kg
Silver medal – second place	2019 Bucharest	50 kg
Silver medal – second place	2021 Warsaw	50 kg
Silver medal – second place	2022 Budapest	50 kg
Bronze medal – third place	2024 Bucharest	50 kg
Yasar Dogu Tournament
Gold medal – first place	2020 Istanbul	50 kg
Gold medal – first place	2021 Istanbul	50 kg
Bronze medal – third place	2022 Istanbul	50 kg
Dan Kolov - Nikola Petrov Tournament
Gold medal – first place	2017 Ruse	48 kg
Gold medal – first place	2022 Veliko Tarnovo	50 kg
Bronze medal – third place	2016 Sofia	48 kg
Bronze medal – third place	2023 Sofia	50 kg
Golden Grand Prix Ivan Yarygin
Bronze medal – third place	2017 Krasnoyarsk	48 kg
World Juniors Championships
Bronze medal – third place	2014 Zagreb	44 kg
Bronze medal – third place	2016 Mâcon	48 kg
European Juniors Championships
Gold medal – first place	2013 Skopje	44 kg
Gold medal – first place	2014 Warsaw	44 kg
Gold medal – first place	2015 Istanbul	44 kg
Women's beach wrestling
World Beach Games
Silver medal – second place	2019 Doha	50 kg

Miglena Georgieva Selishka (Bulgarian: Миглена Георгиева Селишка; born 13 February 1996) is a Bulgarian freestyle wrestler. At the 2020 European Wrestling Championships held in Rome, Italy, she won the gold medal in the women's 50 kg event. She also won the silver medal in this event in 2019, 2021 and 2022. She competed in the women's 50 kg event at the 2020 Summer Olympics held in Tokyo, Japan.

== Career ==
Selishka won the gold medal in the 44 kg event at the 2013 European Juniors Wrestling Championships held in Skopje, North Macedonia. She repeated this a year later at the 2014 European Juniors Wrestling Championships held in Warsaw, Poland. Selishka also won one of the bronze medals in her event at the 2014 World Junior Wrestling Championships held in Zagreb, Croatia. In 2015, she won the gold medal in her event at the European Juniors Wrestling Championships held in Istanbul, Turkey. In 2016, Selishka won one of the bronze medals in the 48 kg event at the World Junior Wrestling Championships held in Mâcon, France.

In 2017, Selishka won one of the bronze medals in the 48 kg event at the Golden Grand Prix Ivan Yarygin held in Krasnoyarsk, Russia. In that same year, she also competed in the 48 kg event at the 2017 European Wrestling Championships in Novi Sad, Serbia where she was eliminated in her first match by Milana Dadasheva. Later that year, Selishka competed in the 48 kg event at the 2017 World Wrestling Championships without winning a medal. She was eliminated in her second match by Jasmine Mian of Canada.

Selishka won the silver medal in the women's 50 kg at the 2019 European Wrestling Championships held in Bucharest, Romania. In that same year, she represented Bulgaria at the 2019 World Beach Games in Doha, Qatar and she won the silver medal in the women's 50 kg event. In 2020, Selishka won one of the bronze medals in the women's 50 kg event at the Individual Wrestling World Cup held in Belgrade, Serbia.

In March 2021, Selishka won the silver medal in the 50 kg event at the Matteo Pellicone Ranking Series held in Rome, Italy. In the same month, she also qualified at the European Qualification Tournament to compete at the 2020 Summer Olympics in Tokyo, Japan. In April 2021, she won the silver medal in the 50 kg event at the European Wrestling Championships held in Warsaw, Poland. In October 2021, Selishka competed in the women's 50 kg event at the World Wrestling Championships held in Oslo, Norway.

In February 2022, Selishka won the gold medal in the 50 kg event at the Dan Kolov & Nikola Petrov Tournament held in Veliko Tarnovo, Bulgaria. In that same month, she also won one of the bronze medals in her event at the Yasar Dogu Tournament held in Istanbul, Turkey. In March 2022, Selishka won the silver medal in the 50 kg event at the European Wrestling Championships held in Budapest, Hungary. In September 2022, she competed in the 50 kg event at the World Wrestling Championships held in Belgrade, Serbia.

Selishka won one of the bronze medals in the women's 50 kg event at the 2023 Dan Kolov & Nikola Petrov Tournament held in Sofia, Bulgaria. She also won one of the bronze medals in the women's 50 kg event at the 2024 European Wrestling Championships held in Bucharest, Romania. Selishka competed at the 2024 European Wrestling Olympic Qualification Tournament in Baku, Azerbaijan hoping to qualify for the 2024 Summer Olympics in Paris, France. She was eliminated in her first match and she did not qualify for the Olympics. Selishka also competed at the 2024 World Wrestling Olympic Qualification Tournament held in Istanbul, Turkey without qualifying for the Olympics.

== Achievements ==
Year	Tournament	Location	Result	Event
2019	European Championships	Bucharest, Romania	2nd	Freestyle 50 kg
2019	European Games	Minsk, Belarus	3rd	Freestyle 50 kg
2019	World Beach Games	Doha, Qatar	2nd	Beach wrestling 50 kg
2020	European Championships	Rome, Italy	1st	Freestyle 50 kg
2021	European Championships	Warsaw, Poland	2nd	Freestyle 50 kg
2022	European Championships	Budapest, Hungary	2nd	Freestyle 50 kg
2024	European Championships	Bucharest, Romania	3rd	Freestyle 50 kg
