= Nadezhda Sokolova =

Russian freestyle wrestler

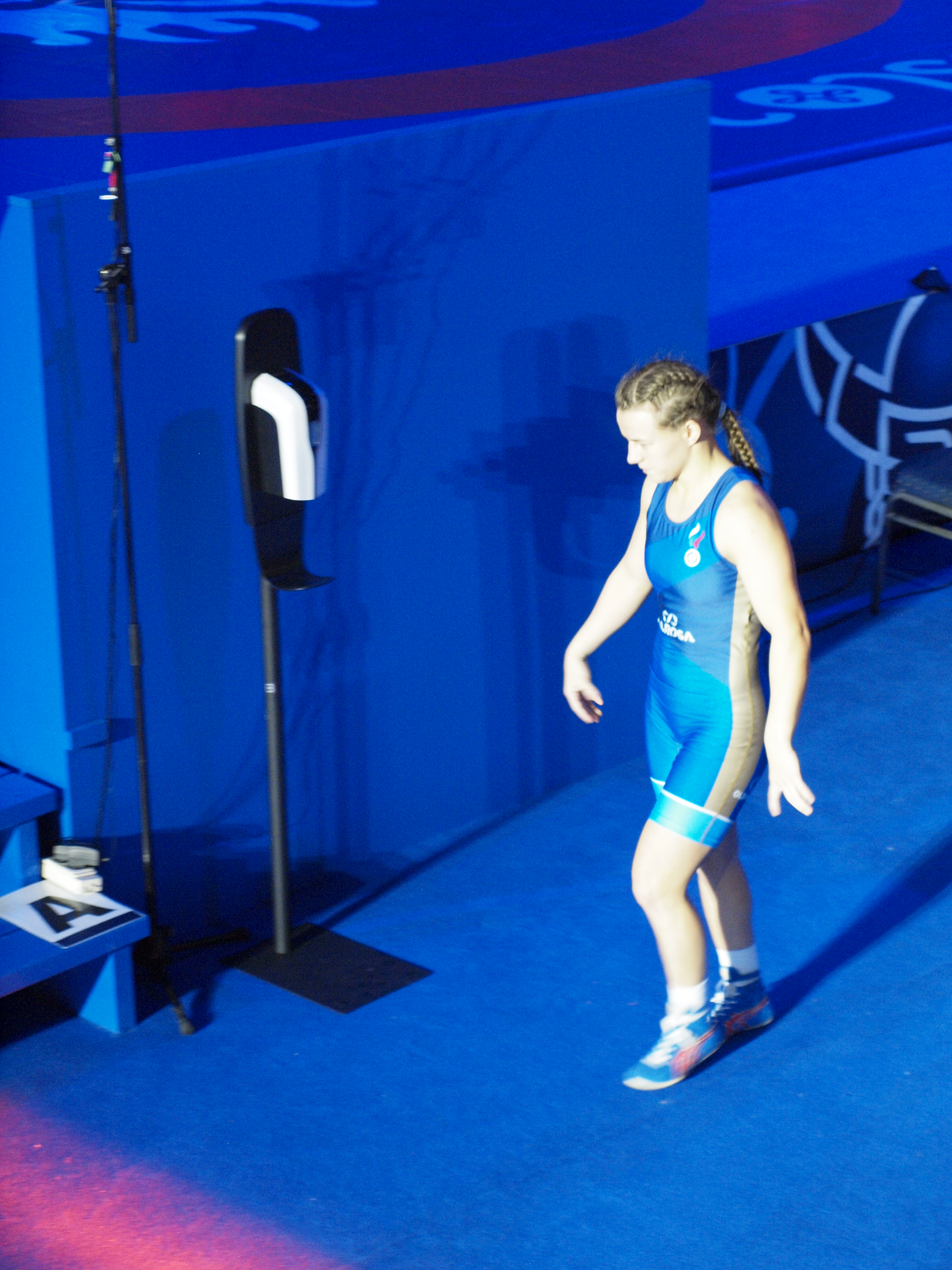

Personal information
- Native name: Соколова Надежда Николаевна
- Nationality: Russia
- Born: 8 November 1996 (age 29) Veliky Novgorod, Russia
- Height: 148 cm (4 ft 10 in)

Sport
- Country: Russia
- Sport: Wrestling
- Weight class: 50 kg
- Event: Freestyle
Medal record
Women's freestyle wrestling
Representing United World Wrestling
European Championships
Bronze medal – third place	2025 Bratislava	50 kg
Representing Individual Neutral Athletes
Yasar Dogu Tournament
Bronze medal – third place	2024 Antalya	50 kg
Grand Prix
Gold medal – first place	2023 Bucharest	50 kg
Gold medal – first place	2025 Zagreb	50 kg
Bronze medal – third place	2024 Zagreb	50 kg
Bronze medal – third place	2025 Tirana	50 kg
Representing Russian Wrestling Federation
World Championships
Bronze medal – third place	2021 Oslo	50 kg
Representing Russia
Golden Grand Prix Ivan Yarygin
Gold medal – first place	2022 Krasnoyarsk	50 kg
Gold medal – first place	2025 Krasnoyarsk	50 kg
Silver medal – second place	2020 Krasnoyarsk	50 kg
Yasar Dogu Tournament
Bronze medal – third place	2019 Istanbul	50 kg
U23 World Championships
Silver medal – second place	2018 Bucharest	50 kg
Bronze medal – third place	2019 Budapest	50 kg
U23 European Championships
Silver medal – second place	2019 Novi Sad	50 kg
World Juniors Championships
Silver medal – second place	2016 Macon	48 kg
European Juniors Championships
Gold medal – first place	2016 Bucharest	48 kg
World Cadets Championships
Gold medal – first place	2011 Szombathely	38 kg
Silver medal – second place	2012 Baku	40 kg
Bronze medal – third place	2013 Zrenjanin	43 kg
European Cadets Championships
Gold medal – first place	2013 Bar	43 kg
Silver medal – second place	2012 Katowice	40 kg

Nadezhda Nikolaevna Sokolova is a Russian freestyle wrestler. She won one of the bronze medals in the women's 50 kg event at the 2021 World Wrestling Championships in Oslo, Norway.

In 2022, she competed at the Yasar Dogu Tournament held in Istanbul, Turkey. She competed at the 2024 European Wrestling Olympic Qualification Tournament in Baku, Azerbaijan and she earned a quota place for the Individual Neutral Athletes for the 2024 Summer Olympics in Paris, France. In July 2024, the Russian Wrestling Federation announced that Russian wrestlers would not take part after a unanimous decision to refuse to participate.
