= Anna Łukasiak =

Polish freestyle wrestler

Sport
- Country: Poland
- Sport: Amateur wrestling
- Weight class: 50 kg
- Event: Freestyle
Medal record
Women's freestyle wrestling
Representing Poland
World Championships
Bronze medal – third place	2022 Belgrade	50 kg
European Championships
Bronze medal – third place	2021 Warsaw	50 kg
Bronze medal – third place	2022 Budapest	50 kg

Anna Łukasiak is a Polish freestyle wrestler. She won one of the bronze medals in the women's 50 kg event at the 2022 World Wrestling Championships held in Belgrade, Serbia. She is a two-time bronze medalist at the European Wrestling Championships.

== Career ==
In 2019, Łukasiak lost her bronze medal match in the 50 kg event at the European Games held in Minsk, Belarus. In April 2021, Łukasiak won one of the bronze medals in the 50 kg event at the European Wrestling Championships held in Warsaw, Poland. She defeated Emilia Cîrîcu of Moldova in her bronze medal match.

In March 2022, Łukasiak won one of the bronze medals in the 50 kg event at the European Wrestling Championships held in Budapest, Hungary. A few months later, she won the bronze medal in her event at the Matteo Pellicone Ranking Series 2022 held in Rome, Italy.

Łukasiak competed in the 50 kg event at the 2024 European Wrestling Championships held in Bucharest, Romania. She was eliminated in her first match by Oksana Livach of Ukraine. Łukasiak competed at the 2024 European Wrestling Olympic Qualification Tournament in Baku, Azerbaijan hoping to qualify for the 2024 Summer Olympics in Paris, France. She was eliminated in her first match and she did not qualify for the Olympics. Łukasiak also competed at the 2024 World Wrestling Olympic Qualification Tournament held in Istanbul, Turkey without qualifying for the Olympics.

== Achievements ==
Year	Tournament	Location	Result	Event
2021	European Championships	Warsaw, Poland	3rd	Freestyle 50 kg
2022	European Championships	Budapest, Hungary	3rd	Freestyle 50 kg
2022	World Championships	Belgrade, Serbia	3rd	Freestyle 50 kg
