= Kseniya Stankevich =

Belarusian freestyle wrestler

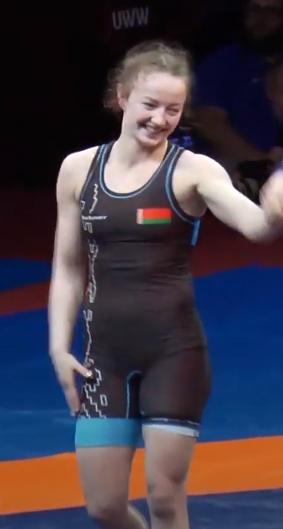
- Stankevich in 2019

Personal information
- Born: 28 January 1996 (age 30)
- Height: 152 cm (5 ft 0 in)

Sport
- Country: Belarus
- Sport: Amateur wrestling
- Weight class: 50 kg
- Event: Freestyle
Medal record
Women's freestyle wrestling
Representing Belarus
European Championships
Bronze medal – third place	2019 Bucharest	50 kg
Bronze medal – third place	2020 Rome	50 kg
Military World Games
Bronze medal – third place	2019 Wuhan	50 kg
European U23 Championship
Bronze medal – third place	2018 Istanbul	50 kg
Junior World Championships
Bronze medal – third place	2015 Salvador da Bahia	44 kg

Kseniya Stankevich (born 28 January 1996) is a Belarusian freestyle wrestler. She is a two-time bronze medalist in the women's 50 kg event at the European Wrestling Championships. She also won a bronze medal in her event at the 2019 Military World Games held in Wuhan, China.

== Career ==
Stankevich won one of the bronze medals in the women's 44 kg event at the 2015 World Junior Wrestling Championships held in Salvador da Bahia, Brazil.

At the 2020 European Wrestling Championships held in Rome, Italy, Stankevich won one of the bronze medals in the women's 50 kg event. She also won one of the bronze medals in the women's 50 kg event at the 2019 European Wrestling Championships held in Bucharest, Romania.

In 2019, at the Military World Games held in Wuhan, China, Stankevich won one of the bronze medals in the women's 50 kg event.

In 2022, Stankevich competed in the 50 kg event at the Yasar Dogu Tournament held in Istanbul, Turkey. She competed at the 2024 European Wrestling Olympic Qualification Tournament in Baku, Azerbaijan hoping to qualify for the 2024 Summer Olympics in Paris, France. She was eliminated in her first match and she did not qualify for the Olympics.

== Achievements ==
Year	Tournament	Location	Result	Event
2019	European Championships	Bucharest, Romania	3rd	Freestyle 50 kg
2019	Military World Games	Wuhan, China	3rd	Freestyle 50 kg
2020	European Championships	Rome, Italy	3rd	Freestyle 50 kg
