= Evin Demirhan Yavuz =

Turkish freestyle wrestler (born 1995)

Evin Demirhan
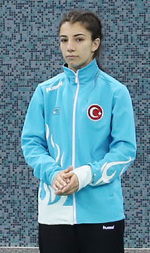

Personal information
- Full name: Evin Demirhan Yavuz
- Nationality: Turkish
- Born: Evin Demirhan; 2 July 1995 (age 31) Siirt, Turkey
- Height: 158 cm (5 ft 2 in)
- Weight: 50 kg (110 lb)

Sport
- Country: Turkey
- Sport: Women's freestyle wrestling
- Event: 50 kg
- Club: Ankara ASKI
Medal record
Women's freestyle wrestling
Representing Turkey
World Championships
Bronze medal – third place	2017 Paris	48 kg
Bronze medal – third place	2025 Zagreb	50 kg
European Championships
Gold medal – first place	2022 Budapest	50 kg
Silver medal – second place	2024 Bucharest	50 kg
Silver medal – second place	2025 Bratislava	50 kg
Bronze medal – third place	2018 Kaspiysk	50 kg
Bronze medal – third place	2019 Bucharest	50 kg
Bronze medal – third place	2023 Zagreb	50 kg
European Games
Bronze medal – third place	2019 Minsk	50 kg
Islamic Solidarity Games
Silver medal – second place	2017 Baku	48 kg
Mediterranean Games
Gold medal – first place	2018 Tarragona	50 kg
Gold medal – first place	2022 Oran	50 kg
World University Championships
Bronze medal – third place	2016 Çorum	48 kg
Yasar Dogu Tournament
Gold medal – first place	2016 Istanbul	50 kg
Silver medal – second place	2020 Istanbul	50 kg
Silver medal – second place	2024 Antalya	50 kg
Bronze medal – third place	2017 Istanbul	50 kg
Bronze medal – third place	2019 Istanbul	50 kg
Dan Kolov - Nikola Petrov Tournament
Bronze medal – third place	2015 Sofia	48 kg
Bronze medal – third place	2019 Ruse	50 kg
Grand Prix
Silver medal – second place	2021 Nice	50 kg
Bronze medal – third place	2017 Bucharest	48 kg
Bronze medal – third place	2020 Warsaw	50 kg
World U23 Championships
Gold medal – first place	2017 Bydgoszcz	48 kg
European U23 Championships
Gold medal – first place	2016 Russe	48 kg
Silver medal – second place	2018 Istanbul	50 kg
Bronze medal – third place	2015 Walbrzych	48 kg
Bronze medal – third place	2017 Szombathely	48 kg
World Juniors Championships
Bronze medal – third place	2013 Sofia	44 kg
European Juniors Championships
Silver medal – second place	2012 Zagreb	44 kg
Silver medal – second place	2014 Katowice	48 kg
Bronze medal – third place	2013 Skopje	44 kg
Bronze medal – third place	2015 Istanbul	48 kg
World Cadets Championships
Bronze medal – third place	2011 Szombathely	40 kg
European Cadets Championships
Gold medal – first place	2010 Sarajevo	38 kg
Bronze medal – third place	2011 Warsaw	40 kg
Bronze medal – third place	2012 Katowice	43 kg

Evin Demirhan Yavuz (born 2 July 1995) is a Turkish freestyle wrestler competing in the 50 kg division. She is a member of Ankara Aski Spor Club. She won the gold medal at the 2022 European Wrestling Championships.

== Early life ==
Demirhan was born into a crowded Kurdish family in poverty in Siirt, southeastern Turkey on 2 July 1995. During her secondary education at Şehit Zafer Kılıç Sports High School in her hometown, she benefited from a scholarship of the Turkish Wrestling Foundation as one of the twenty successful students and talented wrestlers. She supported her family of 13 financially by wrestling.

In the 89-minute documentary movie titled Siirt'in Sırrı, English : "Know My Name", Demirhan plays the leading role as a 16-year-old girl which features her life and struggle to financially support her family and to build a future for herself. The movie was awarded the "Best National Documentary Film Prize" at the 49th International Antalya Film Festival ("Golden Orange Award") and the "Special Jury Prize for Documentary Film" at the 19th International Adana Film Festival ("Golden Boll Award") both in 2012.

== Sports career ==
Demirhan began sport wrestling as she was 15 years of age. She trains twelve hours a day, six day a week. She was four times Turkish champion in her weight class.

She won the silver medal in the 44 kg event at the 2012 European Junior Wrestling Championships held in Zagreb, Croatia, a bronze medal in the 44 kg event at the 2013 European Junior Wrestling Championships in Skopje, Macedonia, a bronze medal in the 44 kg event at the 2013 World Junior Wrestling Championships in Sofia, Bulgaria, the silver medal at the 2013 European Junior Wrestling Championships, the silver medal at the 2014 European Junior Wrestling Championships, and a bronze medal in the 48 kg event at the same championships of 2015 in Istanbul, Turkey.

She took part at the 2015 European Games in Baku, Azerbaijan competing in the 48 kg event without gaining a medal. In 2017, Demirhan captured the silver medal at the Islamic Solidarity Games in Azerbaijan. She was also the bronze medalist in the 48 kg event at the 2017 World Wrestling Championships held in Paris, France. In 2019, she captured bronze medals at the European Games and at the European Wrestling Championships. In January 2021, she won the silver medal in the women's 50 kg event at the Grand Prix de France Henri Deglane 2021 held in Nice, France. In March 2021, she qualified at the European Qualification Tournament to compete at the 2020 Summer Olympics in Tokyo, Japan. She competed in the women's 50 kg event at the 2020 Summer Olympics. In October 2021, she was eliminated in her first match in the women's 50 kg event at the 2021 World Wrestling Championships held in Oslo, Norway.

In 2022, she competed in the 50 kg event at the Yasar Dogu Tournament held in Istanbul, Turkey. In March 2022, she won the gold medal in the 50 kg event at the 2022 European Wrestling Championships held in Budapest, Hungary. A few months later, she won the gold medal in the 50 kg event at the 2022 Mediterranean Games held in Oran, Algeria.

She won the silver medal in the women's 50 kg event at the 2024 European Wrestling Championships held in Bucharest, Romania. She competed in the women's 50 kg event at the 2024 Summer Olympics in Paris, France.
