= Julie Sabatié =

French freestyle wrestler (born 1994)

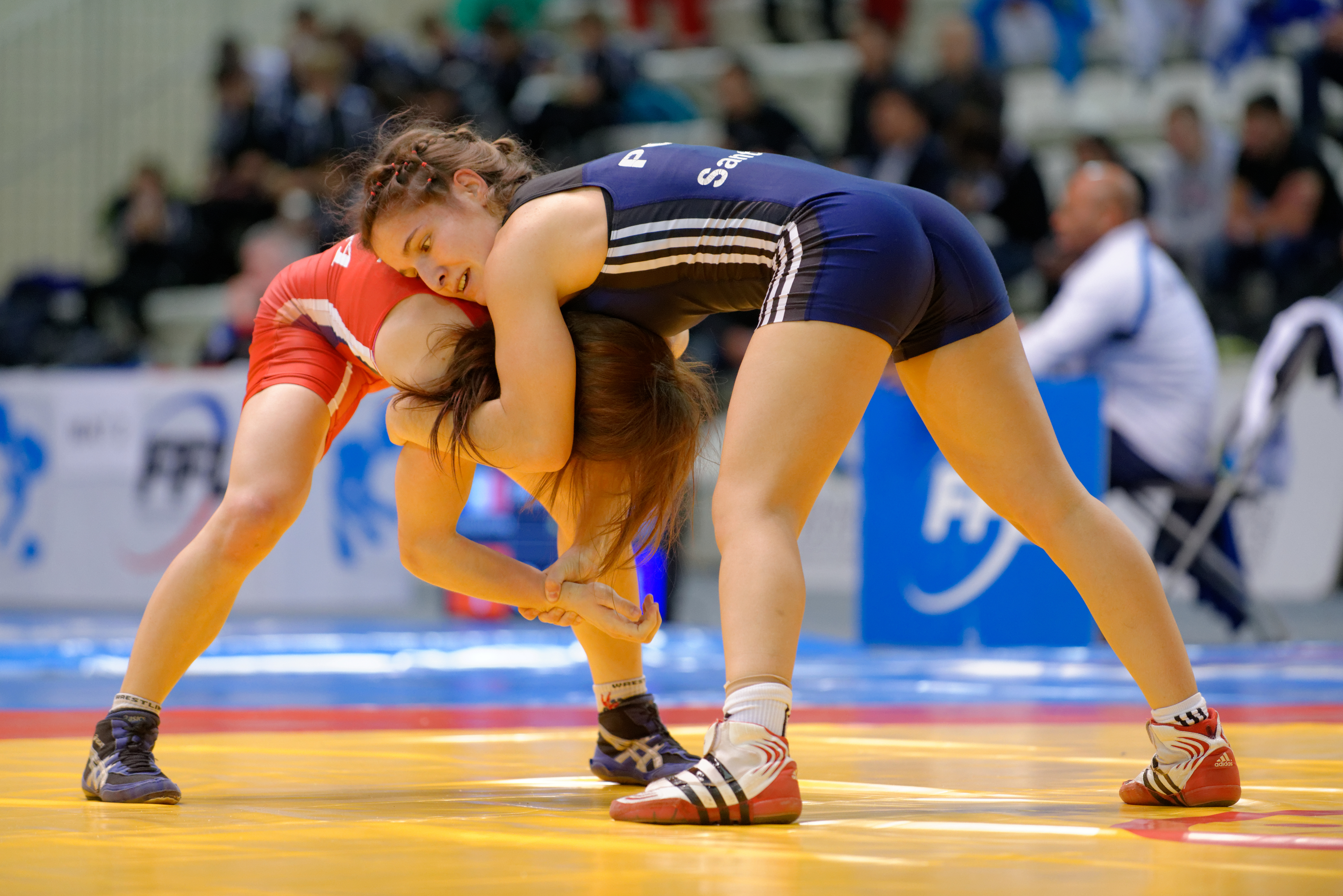
- Sabatié in 2014

Personal information
- Full name: Julie Martine Sabatié
- Nationality: French
- Born: 24 December 1994 (age 31)
- Height: 152 cm (5 ft 0 in)

Sport
- Country: France
- Sport: Wrestling
- Event: Freestyle wrestling
Medal record
Women's freestyle wrestling
Representing France
Mediterranean Games
Silver medal – second place	2018 Tarragona	50 kg
Silver medal – second place	2022 Oran	50 kg
Cadet European Championships
Silver medal – second place	2009	46 kg

Julie Sabatié (born 24 December 1994) is a French freestyle wrestler. She won silver medals in the women's 50 kg event at the 2018 Mediterranean Games in Tarragona and the 2022 Mediterranean Games in Oran. She also finished ninth at the 2017 World Wrestling Championships and seventh at the 2023 European Wrestling Championships.
