= Emanuela Liuzzi =

Italian freestyle wrestler (born 2000)

Personal information
- Born: 27 April 2000 (age 26) Giugliano in Campania, Italy
- Height: 1.50 m (4 ft 11 in)
- Weight: 50 kg (110 lb)

Sport
- Country: Italy
- Sport: Women's freestyle wrestling
- Event: 50 kg
Medal record
Women's freestyle wrestling
Representing Italy
European Championships
Bronze medal – third place	2023 Zagreb	50 kg
World Military Championships
Silver medal – second place	2025 Warendorf	53 kg
Grand Prix
Gold medal – first place	2025 Sassari	50 kg
Gold medal – first place	2026 Nice	50 kg
Silver medal – second place	2023 Sassari	50 kg
Silver medal – second place	2025 Warsaw	50 kg
Bronze medal – third place	2023 Warsaw	50 kg
Mediterranean Games
Bronze medal – third place	2026 Taranto	50 kg
European U23 Championship
Silver medal – second place	2023 Bucharest	50 kg
European Juniors Championships
Bronze medal – third place	2018 Rome	50 kg
Bronze medal – third place	2019 Pontevedra	50 kg
European Cadets Championships
Silver medal – second place	2015 Subotica	46 kg

Emanuela Liuzzi (born 27 April 2000) is an Italian freestyle wrestler competing in the 50 kg division. She won a bronze medal at the 2023 European Wrestling Championships held in Zagreb, Croatia.

== Career ==
In 2023, Liuzzi won a bronze medal in the women's freestyle 50 kg event at the 2023 European Wrestling Championships held in Zagreb, Croatia. She competed in the women's 50 kg event at the 2024 European Wrestling Championships held in Bucharest, Romania. She was eliminated in her second match by eventual bronze medalist Miglena Selishka of Bulgaria.

Liuzzi competed at the 2024 European Wrestling Olympic Qualification Tournament in Baku, Azerbaijan hoping to qualify for the 2024 Summer Olympics in Paris, France. She was eliminated in her first match and she did not qualify originally for the Olympics. Liuzzi also competed at the 2024 World Wrestling Olympic Qualification Tournament held in Istanbul, Turkey without qualifying for the Olympics. However, she secured a last-minute spot for the Games, after North Korea's Kim Sonhyang pulled out unexpectedly.

== Achievements ==
Year	Tournament	Location	Result	Event
2023	European Championships	Zagreb, Croatia	3rd	Freestyle 50 kg
