= Oksana Livach =

Ukrainian freestyle wrestler

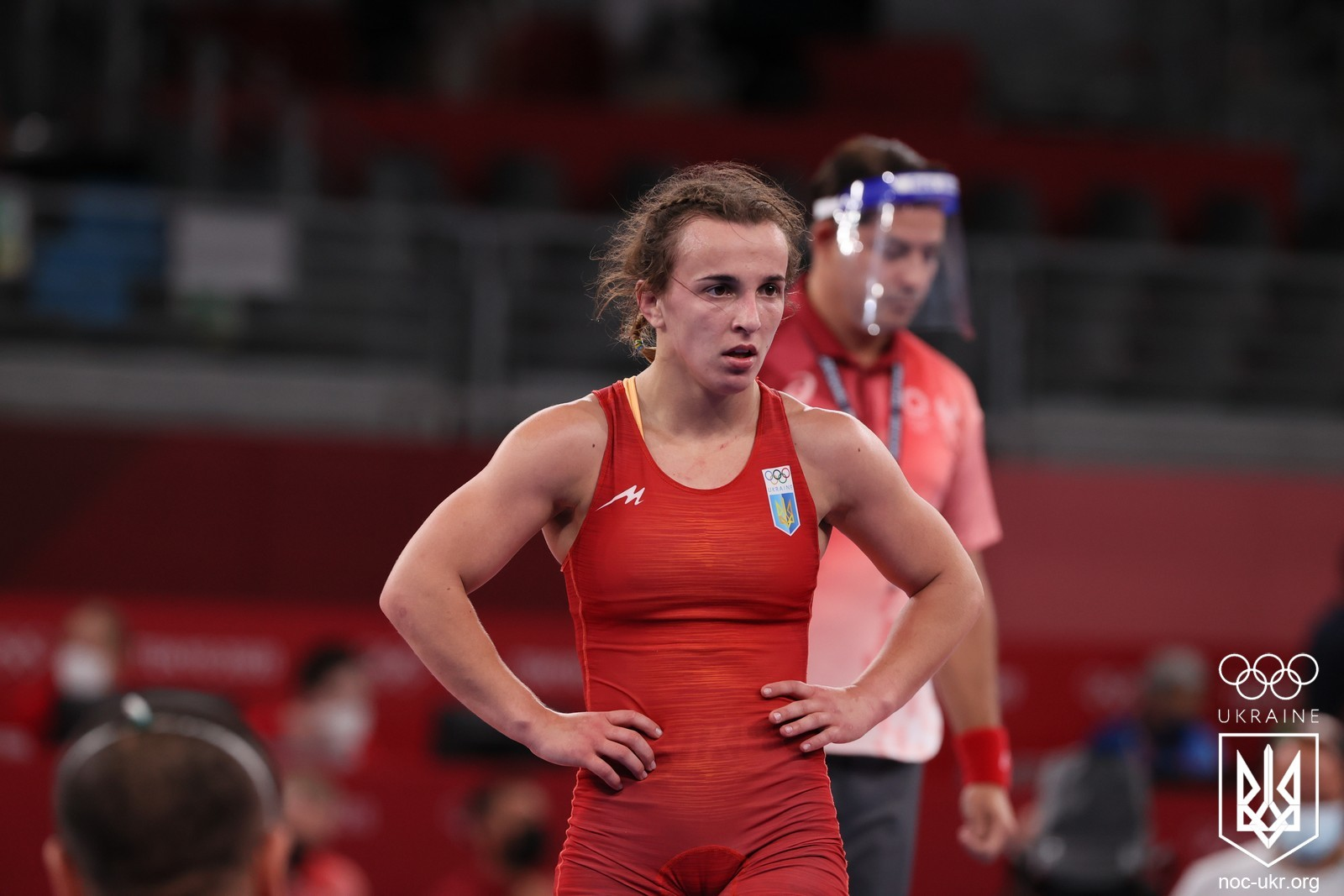
- Oksana Livach at the 2020 Summer Olympics

Personal information
- Native name: Оксана Василівна Лівач
- Full name: Oksana Vasylivna Livach
- Born: 14 May 1997 (age 29) Dolyna, Ivano-Frankivsk Oblast, Ukraine
- Height: 153 cm (5 ft 0 in)

Sport
- Club: "Spartak", Lviv
Medal record
Women's freestyle wrestling
Representing Ukraine
World Championships
| Bronze medal – third place | 2018 Budapest | 50 kg |
European Championships
| Gold medal – first place | 2025 Bratislava | 50 kg |
| Gold medal – first place | 2019 Bucharest | 50 kg |
| Silver medal – second place | 2020 Rome | 50 kg |
| Silver medal – second place | 2023 Zagreb | 50 kg |
European Games
| Silver medal – second place | 2019 Minsk | 50 kg |
European U23 Championship
| Gold medal – first place | 2018 Istanbul | 50 kg |
| Gold medal – first place | 2019 Novi Sad | 50 kg |

Oksana Vasylivna Livach (Ukrainian: Оксана Василівна Лівач; born 14 May 1997 in Dolyna, Ivano-Frankivsk Oblast, Ukraine) is a Ukrainian freestyle wrestler. She is a member of Spartak Lviv sports club. She is a bronze medalist of the 2018 World Championships and 2019 European champion.

In 2021, Livach won the silver medal in her event at the Poland Open held in Warsaw, Poland. She competed in the 50 kg event at the 2022 World Wrestling Championships held in Belgrade, Serbia.

== Career ==
Livach lost her bronze medal match in the women's 50 kg event at the 2024 European Wrestling Championships held in Bucharest, Romania. She competed at the 2024 European Wrestling Olympic Qualification Tournament in Baku, Azerbaijan and she earned a quota place for Ukraine for the 2024 Summer Olympics in Paris, France. She lost her bronze medal match in the women's 50 kg event at the Olympics.
