= 2021 Asian Wrestling Championships – Results =

These are the results of the 2021 Asian Wrestling Championships which took place between 13 and 18 April 2021 in Almaty, Kazakhstan.

== Men's freestyle ==
=== 57 kg ===
17 April

Round of 16
Muhammad Bilal (PAK)	8
Daulet Temirzhanov (KAZ)	8
Rozgeldi Seýidow (TKM)	0
Alireza Sarlak (IRI)	10
Yuto Takeshita (JPN)	4
Zandanbudyn Zanabazar (MGL)	3
Hikmatullo Vohidov (TJK)	10
Anarbek Sydykbekov (KGZ)	0

Quarterfinals
Ravi Kumar Dahiya (IND)	9
Nodirjon Safarov (UZB)	2
Ali Aburumaila (PLE)	7
Song Hyeon-sik (KOR)	5
Muhammad Bilal (PAK)	0
Alireza Sarlak (IRI)	3
Yuto Takeshita (JPN)	4
Hikmatullo Vohidov (TJK)	1

Semifinals
Ravi Kumar Dahiya (IND)	11
Ali Aburumaila (PLE)	0
Alireza Sarlak (IRI)	5
Yuto Takeshita (JPN)	1

Final
Ravi Kumar Dahiya (IND)	9
Alireza Sarlak (IRI)	4

Repechage round 1
Rozgeldi Seýidow (TKM)	4
Muhammad Bilal (PAK)	9

Bronze medals
Nodirjon Safarov (UZB)	12
Ali Aburumaila (PLE)	2
Muhammad Bilal (PAK)	0
Yuto Takeshita (JPN)	7

=== 61 kg ===
18 April

Round of 16
Batsaikhany Nemekhbayar (MGL)	6
Ikromzhon Khadzhimurodov (KGZ)	9

Quarterfinals
Alibeg Alibegov (BRN)	1
Kim Sung-gwon (KOR)	7
Jahongirmirza Turobov (UZB)	5
Shoya Shimae (JPN)	2
Ravinder Dahiya (IND)	3
Majid Dastan (IRI)	3
Adlan Askarov (KAZ)	12
Ikromzhon Khadzhimurodov (KGZ)	0

Semifinals
Kim Sung-gwon (KOR)	0
Jahongirmirza Turobov (UZB)	4
Ravinder Dahiya (IND)	4
Adlan Askarov (KAZ)	7

Final
Jahongirmirza Turobov (UZB)	14
Adlan Askarov (KAZ)	9

Bronze medals
Shoya Shimae (JPN)	5
Kim Sung-gwon (KOR)	1
Ikromzhon Khadzhimurodov (KGZ)	14
Ravinder Dahiya (IND)	4

=== 65 kg ===
17 April

Round of 16
Chamara Perera (SRI)	0
Nodir Rakhimov (UZB)	10
Alibek Osmonov (KGZ)	13
Adil Ospanov (KAZ)	5
Morteza Ghiasi (IRI)	6
Kerim Hojakow (TKM)	2

Quarterfinals
Jeong Yong-seok (KOR)	0
Bajrang Punia (IND)	3
Sarmandakhyn Bilgüün (MGL)	4
Dzhamshed Sharifov (TJK)	0
Takuto Otoguro (JPN)	13
Nodir Rakhimov (UZB)	0
Alibek Osmonov (KGZ)	3
Morteza Ghiasi (IRI)	7

Semifinals
Bajrang Punia (IND)	7^{F}
Sarmandakhyn Bilgüün (MGL)	0
Takuto Otoguro (JPN)	8
Morteza Ghiasi (IRI)	2

Final
Bajrang Punia (IND)
Takuto Otoguro (JPN)	WO

Bronze medals
Jeong Yong-seok (KOR)	4
Sarmandakhyn Bilgüün (MGL)	4
Nodir Rakhimov (UZB)	0
Morteza Ghiasi (IRI)	7^{F}

=== 70 kg ===
17 April

Round of 16
Syrbaz Talgat (KAZ)	11
Mohammad Abdulkareem (KUW)	0
Amir Hossein Hosseini (IRI)	1
Karan Mor (IND)	3

Quarterfinals
Jintaro Motoyama (JPN)	6
Perman Hommadow (TKM)	6^{F}
Islambek Orozbekov (KGZ)	3
Sirojiddin Khasanov (UZB)	4
Lee Seung-bong (KOR)	4^{F}
Enkhtuyaagiin Temüülen (MGL)	7
Syrbaz Talgat (KAZ)	6
Karan Mor (IND)	0

Semifinals
Perman Hommadow (TKM)	4
Sirojiddin Khasanov (UZB)	8
Lee Seung-bong (KOR)	2
Syrbaz Talgat (KAZ)	6

Final
Sirojiddin Khasanov (UZB)	2
Syrbaz Talgat (KAZ)	6

Repechage round 1
Mohammad Abdulkareem (KUW)	0
Karan Mor (IND)	10

Bronze medals
Islambek Orozbekov (KGZ)	6
Perman Hommadow (TKM)	1
Karan Mor (IND)	3
Lee Seung-bong (KOR)	1

=== 74 kg ===
18 April

Round of 16
Gulomdzhon Sharipov (TJK)	2
Mansur Syrgak Uulu (KGZ)	10
Abdulrahman Ibrahim (QAT)	0
Sandeep Singh Mann (IND)	11
Lakmal Wijesooriya (SRI)	0
Atamyrat Çarlyýew (TKM)	10
Ikhtiyor Navruzov (UZB)	2
Mostafa Hosseinkhani (IRI)	5
Lee Seung-chul (KOR)	10
Lou Hong Yeow (SGP)	0

Quarterfinals
Keisuke Otoguro (JPN)	2
Zandanbudyn Sumiyaabazar (MGL)	4
Nurkozha Kaipanov (KAZ)	9
Mansur Syrgak Uulu (KGZ)	0
Sandeep Singh Mann (IND)	4
Atamyrat Çarlyýew (TKM)	5
Mostafa Hosseinkhani (IRI)	10
Lee Seung-chul (KOR)	3

Semifinals
Zandanbudyn Sumiyaabazar (MGL)	2
Nurkozha Kaipanov (KAZ)	4
Atamyrat Çarlyýew (TKM)	0
Mostafa Hosseinkhani (IRI)	11

Final
Nurkozha Kaipanov (KAZ)	6
Mostafa Hosseinkhani (IRI)	2

Repechage round 1
Ikhtiyor Navruzov (UZB)	WO
Lee Seung-chul (KOR)

Bronze medals
Mansur Syrgak Uulu (KGZ)	1
Zandanbudyn Sumiyaabazar (MGL)	4
Ikhtiyor Navruzov (UZB)	5
Atamyrat Çarlyýew (TKM)	0

=== 79 kg ===
17 April

Round of 16
Gurbanmyrat Öwezberdiýew (TKM)	4
Galymzhan Usserbayev (KAZ)	13
Saiakbai Usupov (KGZ)	6
Bobur Islomov (UZB)	1
Ryuki Yoshida (JPN)	0
Ali Savadkouhi (IRI)	2

Quarterfinals
Abdullah Saleem (KUW)	0
Narsingh Yadav (IND)	11
Gong Byung-min (KOR)	4
Ahmed Mohsin (IRQ)	2
Damjingiin Batzul (MGL)	3
Galymzhan Usserbayev (KAZ)	4
Saiakbai Usupov (KGZ)	10
Ali Savadkouhi (IRI)	14

Semifinals
Narsingh Yadav (IND)	5
Gong Byung-min (KOR)	5
Galymzhan Usserbayev (KAZ)	2
Ali Savadkouhi (IRI)	8

Final
Gong Byung-min (KOR)	5
Ali Savadkouhi (IRI)	3

Repechage round 1
Ryuki Yoshida (JPN)
Saiakbai Usupov (KGZ)	WO

Bronze medals
Ahmed Mohsin (IRQ)	2
Narsingh Yadav (IND)	8
Saiakbai Usupov (KGZ)	10
Galymzhan Usserbayev (KAZ)	0

=== 86 kg ===
18 April

Round of 16
Pürevjavyn Önörbat (MGL)	8
Yeskali Dauletkazy (KAZ)	8
Isa Shapiev (UZB)	2
Deepak Punia (IND)	9
Bakhodur Kadirov (TJK)	6
Döwletmyrat Orazgylyjow (TKM)	4

Quarterfinals
Mirlan Chynybekov (KGZ)	11
Mustafa Abdul-Basit (IRQ)	12
Hayato Ishiguro (JPN)	0
Hassan Yazdani (IRI)	10
Kim Gwan-uk (KOR)	11
Pürevjavyn Önörbat (MGL)	0
Deepak Punia (IND)	4
Bakhodur Kadirov (TJK)	3

Semifinals
Mustafa Abdul-Basit (IRQ)	0
Hassan Yazdani (IRI)	10
Kim Gwan-uk (KOR)	0
Deepak Punia (IND)	2

Final
Hassan Yazdani (IRI)	10
Deepak Punia (IND)	0

Repechage round 1
Isa Shapiev (UZB)	6
Bakhodur Kadirov (TJK)	8

Bronze medals
Hayato Ishiguro (JPN)	1
Mustafa Abdul-Basit (IRQ)	2^{F}
Bakhodur Kadirov (TJK)	0
Kim Gwan-uk (KOR)	10

=== 92 kg ===
18 April

Round of 16
Ryoichi Yamanaka (JPN)	4
Sanjeet Kundu (IND)	9

Quarterfinals
Mönkhbaataryn Tsogtgerel (MGL)	8^{F}
Gwon Hyeok-beom (KOR)	4
Elkhan Assadov (KAZ)	2
Azat Gajyýew (TKM)	0
Chyngyz Kerimkulov (KGZ)	1
Rustam Shodiev (UZB)	9
Kamran Ghasempour (IRI)	10
Sanjeet Kundu (IND)	0

Semifinals
Mönkhbaataryn Tsogtgerel (MGL)	7
Elkhan Assadov (KAZ)	2
Rustam Shodiev (UZB)	0
Kamran Ghasempour (IRI)	11

Final
Mönkhbaataryn Tsogtgerel (MGL)	0
Kamran Ghasempour (IRI)	10

Bronze medals
Gwon Hyeok-beom (KOR)	1
Elkhan Assadov (KAZ)	1
Sanjeet Kundu (IND)	11
Rustam Shodiev (UZB)	8

=== 97 kg ===
17 April

Round of 16
Seo Min-won (KOR)	6
Haroon Abid (PAK)	1
Zyýamuhammet Saparow (TKM)	2
Mukhammadrasul Rakhimov (UZB)	4
Arslanbek Turdubekov (KGZ)	0
Satyawart Kadian (IND)	8

Quarterfinals
Chinbatyn Altangerel (MGL)	13
Khalid Al-Shammari (KUW)	0
Takashi Ishiguro (JPN)	1
Alisher Yergali (KAZ)	6
Ali Shabani (IRI)	11
Seo Min-won (KOR)	0
Mukhammadrasul Rakhimov (UZB)	1
Satyawart Kadian (IND)	4

Semifinals
Chinbatyn Altangerel (MGL)	2
Alisher Yergali (KAZ)	6
Ali Shabani (IRI)	10
Satyawart Kadian (IND)	0

Final
Alisher Yergali (KAZ)	2
Ali Shabani (IRI)	12

Bronze medals
Takashi Ishiguro (JPN)	1
Chinbatyn Altangerel (MGL)	1
Seo Min-won (KOR)	2
Satyawart Kadian (IND)	5

=== 125 kg ===
18 April

Round of 16
Taiki Yamamoto (JPN)	6
Amirjon Nutfullaev (UZB)	11
Oleg Boltin (KAZ)	3
Dorjkhandyn Khüderbulga (MGL)	2
Sumit Malik (IND)	4
Şatlyk Hemelýäýew (TKM)	3

Quarterfinals
Aiaal Lazarev (KGZ)	10
Kim Dong-hwan (KOR)	0
Amin Taheri (IRI)	11
Omar Sarem (SYR)	0
Rustam Iskandari (TJK)	14
Amirjon Nutfullaev (UZB)	19
Oleg Boltin (KAZ)	7
Sumit Malik (IND)	1

Semifinals
Aiaal Lazarev (KGZ)	4^{F}
Amin Taheri (IRI)	6
Amirjon Nutfullaev (UZB)	0
Oleg Boltin (KAZ)	3

Final
Aiaal Lazarev (KGZ)	3
Oleg Boltin (KAZ)	4

Repechage round 1
Dorjkhandyn Khüderbulga (MGL)	WO
Sumit Malik (IND)

Bronze medals
Kim Dong-hwan (KOR)	0
Amin Taheri (IRI)	10^{F}
Dorjkhandyn Khüderbulga (MGL)	10
Amirjon Nutfullaev (UZB)	0

== Men's Greco-Roman ==
=== 55 kg ===
13 April

Round of 16
Pouya Dadmarz (IRI)	WO
~~Kim Jin-hyeok (KOR)~~
Zhanserik Sarsenbiyev (KAZ)	5
Mönkh-Erdeniin Davaabandi (MGL)	13

Quarterfinals
~~Sajjad Ali (IRQ)~~
Sandeep (IND)	WO
Nurmukhammet Abdullaev (KGZ)	2
Yu Shiotani (JPN)	8
Aslamjon Azizov (TJK)	5
Ilkhom Bakhromov (UZB)	9
Pouya Dadmarz (IRI)	8
Mönkh-Erdeniin Davaabandi (MGL)	0

Semifinals
Sandeep (IND)	0
Yu Shiotani (JPN)	9
Ilkhom Bakhromov (UZB)	3
Pouya Dadmarz (IRI)	1

Final
Yu Shiotani (JPN)	17
Ilkhom Bakhromov (UZB)	7

Bronze medals
Nurmukhammet Abdullaev (KGZ)	11
Sandeep (IND)	5
Aslamjon Azizov (TJK)	0
Pouya Dadmarz (IRI)	9

=== 60 kg ===
14 April

Round of 16
Mehdi Mohsennejad (IRI)	8
Kuttubek Abdykerim Uulu (KGZ)	0
Asadeddin Al-Osta (SYR)	2
Merdan Allaýarow (TKM)	11

Quarterfinals
Kim Seung-hak (KOR)	1
Aidos Sultangali (KAZ)	10
Karrar Abbas (IRQ)	12^{F}
Gyanender Dahiya (IND)	3
Islomjon Bakhromov (UZB)	0
Ayata Suzuki (JPN)	9
Mehdi Mohsennejad (IRI)	8
Merdan Allaýarow (TKM)	0

Semifinals
Aidos Sultangali (KAZ)	7
Karrar Abbas (IRQ)	2
Ayata Suzuki (JPN)	1
Mehdi Mohsennejad (IRI)	9

Final
Aidos Sultangali (KAZ)	8
Mehdi Mohsennejad (IRI)	4

Repechage round 1
Kuttubek Abdykerim Uulu (KGZ)	7
Merdan Allaýarow (TKM)	12

Bronze medals
Kim Seung-hak (KOR)	9
Karrar Abbas (IRQ)	0
Merdan Allaýarow (TKM)	0
Ayata Suzuki (JPN)	8

=== 63 kg ===
13 April

Round of 16
Neeraj Chhikara (IND)	1
Chung Han-jae (KOR)	9
Azatjan Açilow (TKM)	2
Kensuke Shimizu (JPN)	10
Meisam Dalkhani (IRI)	5
Urmatbek Amatov (KGZ)	0
~~Mohammed Abbas (IRQ)~~
Elmurat Tasmuradov (UZB)	WO

Quarterfinals
Mohammad Fwaz (SYR)	9
Mohammad Al-Ajmi (KUW)	1
Sultan Assetuly (KAZ)	9
Huang Jui-chi (TPE)	0
Chung Han-jae (KOR)	4
Kensuke Shimizu (JPN)	3
Meisam Dalkhani (IRI)	9
Elmurat Tasmuradov (UZB)	7

Semifinals
Mohammad Fwaz (SYR)	4
Sultan Assetuly (KAZ)	12^{F}
Chung Han-jae (KOR)	5
Meisam Dalkhani (IRI)	8

Final
Sultan Assetuly (KAZ)	8^{F}
Meisam Dalkhani (IRI)	3

Repechage round 1
Urmatbek Amatov (KGZ)	WO
Elmurat Tasmuradov (UZB)

Bronze medals
Huang Jui-chi (TPE)	7
Mohammad Fwaz (SYR)	5
Urmatbek Amatov (KGZ)	0
Chung Han-jae (KOR)	3

=== 67 kg ===
14 April

Round of 16
Almat Kebispayev (KAZ)	8
Mirzobek Rakhmatov (UZB)	3
Sheroz Ochilov (TJK)	2
Kim Do-hyeong (KOR)	5

Quarterfinals
Hossein Asadi (IRI)	WO
~~Wael Jasim (IRQ)~~
Tsuchika Shimoyamada (JPN)	9
Ashu Bazard (IND)	0
Abdulkarim Al-Hasan (SYR)	0
Amantur Ismailov (KGZ)	8
Almat Kebispayev (KAZ)	10
Kim Do-hyeong (KOR)	0

Semifinals
Hossein Asadi (IRI)	2
Tsuchika Shimoyamada (JPN)	3
Amantur Ismailov (KGZ)	1
Almat Kebispayev (KAZ)	4

Final
Tsuchika Shimoyamada (JPN)	12^{F}
Almat Kebispayev (KAZ)	7

Repechage round 1
Mirzobek Rakhmatov (UZB)	4
Kim Do-hyeong (KOR)	2

Bronze medals
Ashu Bazard (IND)	0
Hossein Asadi (IRI)	9
Mirzobek Rakhmatov (UZB)	7
Amantur Ismailov (KGZ)	15^{F}

=== 72 kg ===
14 April

Round of 16
Makhmud Bakhshilloev (UZB)	4
Kuldeep Malik (IND)	2

Quarterfinals
Taha Yaseen (IRQ)	4
Muslihiddin Uroqov (TJK)	10
Ryu Han-su (KOR)	10
Taishi Horie (JPN)	1
Amin Kavianinejad (IRI)	8
Azat Sadykov (KAZ)	6
Ruslan Tsarev (KGZ)	8
Makhmud Bakhshilloev (UZB)	0

Semifinals
Muslihiddin Uroqov (TJK)	5
Ryu Han-su (KOR)	6
Amin Kavianinejad (IRI)	1
Ruslan Tsarev (KGZ)	3

Final
Ryu Han-su (KOR)	6
Ruslan Tsarev (KGZ)	5

Bronze medals
Taishi Horie (JPN)	9
Muslihiddin Uroqov (TJK)	0
Makhmud Bakhshilloev (UZB)	1
Amin Kavianinejad (IRI)	2

=== 77 kg ===
13 April

Round of 16
Kodai Sakuraba (JPN)	2
Gurpreet Singh (IND)	4
Bilan Nalgiev (UZB)	WO
~~Bakhit Sharif Badr (QAT)~~
~~Hussein Ali (IRQ)~~
~~Rabbia Khalil (PLE)~~
Kairatbek Tugolbaev (KGZ)	0
Pejman Poshtam (IRI)	9

Quarterfinals
Noh Yeong-hun (KOR)	1
Demeu Zhadrayev (KAZ)	7
Daler Rezazade (TJK)	9
Muhammetberdi Mamedow (TKM)	0
Gurpreet Singh (IND)	11
Bilan Nalgiev (UZB)	8
Bye
Pejman Poshtam (IRI)

Semifinals
Demeu Zhadrayev (KAZ)	2
Daler Rezazade (TJK)	7
Gurpreet Singh (IND)	7
Pejman Poshtam (IRI)	7

Final
Daler Rezazade (TJK)
Pejman Poshtam (IRI)	WO

Repechage round 1
Kairatbek Tugolbaev (KGZ)
Bye

Bronze medals
Muhammetberdi Mamedow (TKM)	0
Demeu Zhadrayev (KAZ)	9
Kairatbek Tugolbaev (KGZ)	5
Gurpreet Singh (IND)	0

=== 82 kg ===
14 April

Pos	Athlete	Pld	W	L	CP	TP	JPN	KAZ	IND	KOR
1	Satoki Mukai (JPN)	3	3	0	13	13	—	5–1	8–1 Fall	WO
2	Yevgeniy Polivadov (KAZ)	3	2	1	9	4	1–3 PO1	—	3–2	WO
3	Harpreet Singh Sandhu (IND)	3	1	2	6	3	0–5 FA	1–3 PO1	—	WO
4	Kim Hyeon-woo (KOR)	3	0	3	0	0	0–5 IN	0–5 IN	0–5 IN	—

Source: UWW

Pos	Athlete	Pld	W	L	CP	TP	KGZ	UZB	IRI
1	Kalidin Asykeev (KGZ)	2	2	0	6	5	—	3–0	2–1
2	Jalgasbay Berdimuratov (UZB)	2	1	1	3	6	0–3 PO	—	6–0
3	Mehdi Ebrahimi (IRI)	2	0	2	1	1	1–3 PO1	0–3 PO	—

Source: UWW

Semifinals
Satoki Mukai (JPN)	2
Jalgasbay Berdimuratov (UZB)	3
Kalidin Asykeev (KGZ)	7
Yevgeniy Polivadov (KAZ)	3

Final
Jalgasbay Berdimuratov (UZB)	3^{F}
Kalidin Asykeev (KGZ)	1
Bronze medal
Satoki Mukai (JPN)	3
Yevgeniy Polivadov (KAZ)	1

=== 87 kg ===
13 April

Round of 16
Abbas Shaalan (IRQ)	0
Tokhirdzhon Okhonov (TJK)	8
Şageldi Annaýew (TKM)	0
Atabek Azisbekov (KGZ)	9

Quarterfinals
Sunil Kumar (IND)	1
Rustam Assakalov (UZB)	3
Nasser Alizadeh (IRI)	3^{F}
Nursultan Tursynov (KAZ)	1
Lee Seung-hwan (KOR)	6
So Sakabe (JPN)	0
Tokhirdzhon Okhonov (TJK)	1
Atabek Azisbekov (KGZ)	9

Semifinals
Rustam Assakalov (UZB)	4
Nasser Alizadeh (IRI)	10
Lee Seung-hwan (KOR)	3
Atabek Azisbekov (KGZ)	6

Final
Nasser Alizadeh (IRI)	3
Atabek Azisbekov (KGZ)	1

Repechage round 1
Şageldi Annaýew (TKM)	0
Tokhirdzhon Okhonov (TJK)	9

Bronze medals
Nursultan Tursynov (KAZ)	2
Rustam Assakalov (UZB)	2
Tokhirdzhon Okhonov (TJK)	1
Lee Seung-hwan (KOR)	6

=== 97 kg ===
14 April

Round of 16
Beksultan Makhmudov (KGZ)	5
Ravi Rathee (IND)	1

Quarterfinals
Amirjon Juraev (TJK)	0
Yerulan Iskakov (KAZ)	9
~~Ali Majeed (IRQ)~~
Mehdi Bali (IRI)	WO
Masayuki Amano (JPN)	1
Kim Seung-jun (KOR)	2
Ergali Aykhimbaev (UZB)	3
Beksultan Makhmudov (KGZ)	7

Semifinals
Yerulan Iskakov (KAZ)	9
Mehdi Bali (IRI)	11
Kim Seung-jun (KOR)	2
Beksultan Makhmudov (KGZ)	1

Final
Mehdi Bali (IRI)	9
Kim Seung-jun (KOR)	5

Bronze medals
~~Ali Majeed (IRQ)~~
Yerulan Iskakov (KAZ)	WO
Masayuki Amano (JPN)	3
Beksultan Makhmudov (KGZ)	5

=== 130 kg ===
13 April

Quarterfinals		Semifinals		Final
~~Ahmed Shaalan (IRQ)~~
Kim Min-joon (KOR)	WO	Kim Min-joon (KOR)	3
Sota Okumura (JPN)	0	Alimkhan Syzdykov (KAZ)	8^{F}
Alimkhan Syzdykov (KAZ)	8^{F}			Alimkhan Syzdykov (KAZ)	1
Naveen Sevlia (IND)	0			Ali Akbar Yousefi (IRI)	5
Sukhrob Fattoev (UZB)	9	Sukhrob Fattoev (UZB)	5
Ali Akbar Yousefi (IRI)	9	Ali Akbar Yousefi (IRI)	14^{C}
Murat Ramonov (KGZ)	1

Bronze medals
Sota Okumura (JPN)	0
Kim Min-joon (KOR)	9
Murat Ramonov (KGZ)	5
Sukhrob Fattoev (UZB)	1

== Women's freestyle ==
=== 50 kg ===
15 April

Pos	Athlete	Pld	W	L	CP	TP	KAZ	IND	MGL
1	Valentina Islamova (KAZ)	2	2	0	10	12	—	8–0 Fall	4–0 Fall
2	Seema Bisla (IND)	2	1	1	3	7	0–5 FA	—	7–3
3	Nandintsetsegiin Anudari (MGL)	2	0	2	1	3	0–5 FA	1–3 PO1	—

Source: UWW

Pos	Athlete	Pld	W	L	CP	TP	UZB	TPE	KOR
1	Jasmina Immaeva (UZB)	2	2	0	8	10	—	6–0 Fall	4–2
2	Lin Yung-hsun (TPE)	2	1	1	5	4	0–5 FA	—	4–1 Fall
3	Kim Yeo-jin (KOR)	2	0	2	1	3	1–3 PO1	0–5 FA	—

Source: UWW

Semifinals
Valentina Islamova (KAZ)	4^{F}
Lin Yung-hsun (TPE)	0
Jasmina Immaeva (UZB)	3
Seema Bisla (IND)	2

Final
Valentina Islamova (KAZ)	10
Jasmina Immaeva (UZB)	0
Bronze medal
Lin Yung-hsun (TPE)	0
Seema Bisla (IND)	10

=== 53 kg ===
16 April

Pos	Athlete	Pld	W	L	CP	TP	KAZ	KOR	UZB
1	Assylzat Sagymbay (KAZ)	2	2	0	9	12	—	WO	12–2
2	Oh Hyun-young (KOR)	2	1	1	5	8	0–5 IN	—	8–1 Fall
3	Shakhnozakhon Makhmudova (UZB)	2	0	2	1	3	1–4 SU1	0–5 FA	—

Source: UWW

Pos	Athlete	Pld	W	L	CP	TP	IND	TPE	MGL
1	Vinesh Phogat (IND)	2	2	0	8	23	—	12–0	11–0
2	Hsieh Meng-hsuan (TPE)	2	1	1	4	12	0–4 SU	—	12–0
3	Ganbaataryn Otgonjargal (MGL)	2	0	2	0	0	0–4 SU	0–4 SU	—

Source: UWW

Semifinals
Assylzat Sagymbay (KAZ)	6
Hsieh Meng-hsuan (TPE)	6^{F}
Vinesh Phogat (IND)	WO
Oh Hyun-young (KOR)

Final
Hsieh Meng-hsuan (TPE)	0
Vinesh Phogat (IND)	6^{F}
Bronze medal
Assylzat Sagymbay (KAZ)	WO
Oh Hyun-young (KOR)

=== 55 kg ===
15 April

Pos	Athlete	Pld	W	L	CP	TP	MGL	KAZ	KOR	UZB
1	Mönkhboldyn Dölgöön (MGL)	3	3	0	15	22	—	3–0 Fall	5–0 Fall	14–0 Fall
2	Aisha Ualishan (KAZ)	3	1	2	3	6	0–5 FA	—	5–5	1–4 Fall
3	Kim Hyung-joo (KOR)	3	0	3	2	8	0–5 FA	1–3 PO1	—	3–5
DQ	Madina Usmonjonova (UZB)	3	2	1	8	9	0–5 FA	5–0 FA	3–1 PO1	—

Source: UWW
- Madina Usmonjonova of Uzbekistan originally won the silver medal, but was disqualified after she tested positive for Furosemide.

=== 57 kg ===
16 April

Pos	Athlete	Pld	W	L	CP	TP	IND	MGL	KGZ	UZB
1	Anshu Malik (IND)	3	3	0	13	29	—	9–1 3C	10–0	10–0
2	Altantsetsegiin Battsetseg (MGL)	3	2	1	7	18	0–5 CA	—	7–0	10–0
3	Nazira Marsbek Kyzy (KGZ)	3	1	2	4	11	0–4 SU	0–3 PO	—	11–0
4	Sevara Eshmuratova (UZB)	3	0	3	0	0	0–4 SU	0–4 SU	0–4 SU	—

Source: UWW

Pos	Athlete	Pld	W	L	CP	TP	KAZ	KOR	SGP
1	Altynay Satylgan (KAZ)	2	2	0	8	20	—	10–0	10–0
2	Lee Shin-hye (KOR)	2	1	1	4	11	0–4 SU	—	11–0
3	Danielle Lim (SGP)	2	0	2	0	0	0–4 SU	0–4 SU	—

Source: UWW

Semifinals
Anshu Malik (IND)	2^{F}
Lee Shin-hye (KOR)	2
Altynay Satylgan (KAZ)	1
Altantsetsegiin Battsetseg (MGL)	10^{F}

Final
Anshu Malik (IND)	3
Altantsetsegiin Battsetseg (MGL)	0
Bronze medal
Lee Shin-hye (KOR)	1
Altynay Satylgan (KAZ)	4

=== 59 kg ===
15 April

Pos	Athlete	Pld	W	L	CP	TP	MGL	IND	KAZ
1	Baatarjavyn Shoovdor (MGL)	2	2	0	7	18	—	5–4	13–0
2	Sarita Mor (IND)	2	1	1	5	15	1–3 PO1	—	11–0
3	Diana Kayumova (KAZ)	2	0	2	0	0	0–4 SU	0–4 SU	—

Source: UWW

Pos	Athlete	Pld	W	L	CP	TP	KGZ	UZB	KOR
1	Nuraida Anarkulova (KGZ)	2	2	0	8	5	—	5–2	WO
2	Dilfuza Aimbetova (UZB)	2	1	1	6	2	1–3 PO1	—	WO
3	Um Ji-eun (KOR)	2	0	2	0	0	0–5 IN	0–5 IN	—

Source: UWW

Semifinals
Baatarjavyn Shoovdor (MGL)	10
Dilfuza Aimbetova (UZB)	0
Nuraida Anarkulova (KGZ)	0
Sarita Mor (IND)	11

Final
Baatarjavyn Shoovdor (MGL)	7
Sarita Mor (IND)	10
Bronze medal
Dilfuza Aimbetova (UZB)	0
Nuraida Anarkulova (KGZ)	7

=== 62 kg ===
16 April

Pos	Athlete	Pld	W	L	CP	TP	KGZ	KAZ	KOR	IND
1	Aisuluu Tynybekova (KGZ)	3	3	0	13	21	—	11–1	10–0	WO
2	Irina Kuznetsova (KAZ)	3	2	1	10	11	1–4 SU1	—	10–0	WO
3	Kwon Young-jin (KOR)	3	1	2	5	0	0–4 SU	0–4 SU	—	WO
4	Sonam Malik (IND)	3	0	3	0	0	0–5 IN	0–5 IN	0–5 IN	—

Source: UWW

Pos	Athlete	Pld	W	L	CP	TP	MGL	UZB	SRI
1	Khürelkhüügiin Bolortuyaa (MGL)	2	2	0	10	14	—	8–2 Fall	6–0 Fall
2	Rushana Abdirasulova (UZB)	2	1	1	5	8	0–5 FA	—	6–0 Fall
3	Deepika Dilhani (SRI)	2	0	2	0	0	0–5 FA	0–5 FA	—

Source: UWW

Semifinals
Aisuluu Tynybekova (KGZ)	8^{F}
Rushana Abdirasulova (UZB)	2
Khürelkhüügiin Bolortuyaa (MGL)	7
Irina Kuznetsova (KAZ)	1

Final
Aisuluu Tynybekova (KGZ)	11
Khürelkhüügiin Bolortuyaa (MGL)	0
Bronze medal
Rushana Abdirasulova (UZB)	4
Irina Kuznetsova (KAZ)	4

=== 65 kg ===
16 April

Pos	Athlete	Pld	W	L	CP	TP	MGL	KOR	UZB
1	Zorigtyn Bolortungalag (MGL)	2	2	0	10	16	—	4–3 Fall	12–0 Fall
2	Lee Han-bit (KOR)	2	1	1	3	6	0–5 FA	—	3–1
3	Ariukhan Jumabaeva (UZB)	2	0	2	1	1	0–5 FA	1–3 PO1	—

Source: UWW

Pos	Athlete	Pld	W	L	CP	TP	IND	TPE	KAZ
1	Sakshi Malik (IND)	2	2	0	8	20	—	10–0	10–0
2	Pai Hsin-ping (TPE)	2	1	1	3	4	0–4 SU	—	4–2
3	Gaukhar Mukatay (KAZ)	2	0	2	1	2	0–4 SU	1–3 PO1	—

Source: UWW

Semifinals
Zorigtyn Bolortungalag (MGL)	8^{F}
Pai Hsin-ping (TPE)	0
Sakshi Malik (IND)	3^{F}
Lee Han-bit (KOR)	0

Final
Zorigtyn Bolortungalag (MGL)	4^{F}
Sakshi Malik (IND)	0
Bronze medal
Pai Hsin-ping (TPE)	1
Lee Han-bit (KOR)	6

=== 68 kg ===
15 April

Pos	Athlete	Pld	W	L	CP	TP	KGZ	UZB	KAZ
1	Meerim Zhumanazarova (KGZ)	2	2	0	8	21	—	11–1	10–0
2	Azoda Esbergenova (UZB)	2	1	1	4	6	1–4 SU1	—	5–2
3	Anastassiya Panassovich (KAZ)	2	0	2	1	2	0–4 SU	1–3 PO1	—

Source: UWW

Pos	Athlete	Pld	W	L	CP	TP	MGL	KOR	IND
1	Enkhsaikhany Delgermaa (MGL)	2	2	0	8	12	—	4–0	8–0 Fall
2	Jeong Eun-sun (KOR)	2	1	1	5	2	0–3 PO	—	2–6 Fall
3	Nisha Dahiya (IND)	2	0	2	0	6	0–5 FA	0–5 FA	—

Source: UWW

Semifinals
Meerim Zhumanazarova (KGZ)	6^{F}
Jeong Eun-sun (KOR)	0
Enkhsaikhany Delgermaa (MGL)	10
Azoda Esbergenova (UZB)	0

Final
Meerim Zhumanazarova (KGZ)	6
Enkhsaikhany Delgermaa (MGL)	1
Bronze medal
Jeong Eun-sun (KOR)	7
Azoda Esbergenova (UZB)	2

=== 72 kg ===
16 April

Pos	Athlete	Pld	W	L	CP	TP	IND	KAZ	MGL	KOR
1	Divya Kakran (IND)	3	3	0	13	12	—	8–5	2–0 Fall	2–0 Fall
2	Zhamila Bakbergenova (KAZ)	3	2	1	9	18	1–3 PO1	—	9–2	4–4 Fall
3	Enkhbayaryn Tsevegmid (MGL)	3	1	2	4	8	0–5 FA	1–3 PO1	—	6–0
4	Park Su-jin (KOR)	3	0	3	0	4	0–5 FA	0–5 FA	0–3 PO	—

Source: UWW

=== 76 kg ===
15 April

Pos	Athlete	Pld	W	L	CP	TP	IND	KOR	UZB
1	Pooja Sihag (IND)	2	2	0	8	12	—	2–0	10–0 Fall
2	Jeong Seo-yeon (KOR)	2	1	1	3	6	0–3 PO	—	6–0
3	Ozoda Zaripboeva (UZB)	2	0	2	0	0	0–5 FA	0–3 PO	—

Source: UWW

Pos	Athlete	Pld	W	L	CP	TP	KGZ	KAZ	MGL
1	Aiperi Medet Kyzy (KGZ)	2	2	0	6	10	—	6–1	4–1
2	Elmira Syzdykova (KAZ)	2	1	1	6	9	1–3 PO1	—	8–0 Fall
3	Naigalsürengiin Zagardulam (MGL)	2	0	2	1	1	1–3 PO1	0–5 FA	—

Source: UWW

Semifinals
Pooja Sihag (IND)	0
Elmira Syzdykova (KAZ)	4^{F}
Aiperi Medet Kyzy (KGZ)	10
Jeong Seo-yeon (KOR)	0

Final
Elmira Syzdykova (KAZ)	4^{F}
Aiperi Medet Kyzy (KGZ)	0
Bronze medal
Pooja Sihag (IND)	5
Jeong Seo-yeon (KOR)	2
