= Pooja Gehlot =

Indian freestyle wrestler

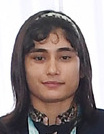
- Gehlot in August 2022

Personal information
- Born: 15 March 1997 (age 29) Lampur village, Delhi, India
- Height: 5 ft 3 in (160 cm)

Sport
- Country: India
- Sport: Freestyle wrestling
- Event: 50 kg/53 kg
Medal record
Women's freestyle wrestling
Representing India
Event	1st	2nd	3rd
Commonwealth Games	-	-	1
World U23 Wrestling Championships	-	1	-
Total	0	1	1
Commonwealth Games
Bronze medal – third place	2022 Birmingham	50 kg
World U23 Championships
Silver medal – second place	2019 Budapest	53 kg

Pooja Gehlot (born 15 March 1997) is an Indian freestyle wrestler. She won the bronze medal in the women's 50 kg event at the 2022 Commonwealth Games held in Birmingham, England. She also won a silver medal at the 2019 U23 World Wrestling Championships in the 53 kg category. Gehlot participated in this championship after a two-year break because of a shoulder injury.

== Personal life and background ==
Pooja Gehlot was born on 15 March 1997 in Delhi in a Jat Family. She showed keen interest in sports from an early age. Her uncle Dharamveer Singh was a wrestler and he started taking her to an akhara when she was about six years of age. However, her father Vijender Singh was opposed to her playing wrestling and Gehlot started playing volleyball. She went up to play at the junior national-level in volleyball. Although, her coaches thought that she was not tall enough to make an impact in the game.

Gehlot's got inspired after Geeta Phogat and Babita Kumari Phogat from Haryana won medals for India at the 2010 Commonwealth Games. The Phogat sisters' success inspired Gehlot to switch to wrestling. She began training professionally in 2014. However, the suburb of Delhi - where her family was living at the time - did not have a wrestling practice centre for girls. She found a training centre in Delhi city, which meant she had to travel three hours by bus every day to reach there and she had to wake up at 3 AM for that. However, the long distance had eventually forced her to shift to a nearby akhara and start training with boys. It was not easy for Gehlot to wrestle with boys and she felt shy wearing a singlet. The family moved to Rohtak town in Haryana to enable her to access better training.

She won the national junior wrestling championship in 2016 in the 48 kg weight category. However, in the same year, she suffered an injury that kept her away from wrestling for more than year.

== Professional Achievements ==
Gehlot found her first success in the international arena when she won a gold medal in the Asian Junior Championship in Taiwan in 2017.

Another major step for her was winning a silver medal at the under-23 World Wrestling Championship in the 51 kg category in Budapest, Hungary in 2019. She also became only the second Indian woman to win a silver medal in that event.

In 2022, she competed at the Yasar Dogu Tournament held in Istanbul, Turkey.

== Senior career results ==
Res.	Record	Opponent	Score	Date	Event	Location
Tied 5th at 50 kg
Loss	6-6	Aktenge Keunimjaeva (KAZ)	2-9	5 October 2023	2022 Asian Games	(China) Hangzhou
Loss	6-5	Remina Yoshimoto (JPN)	0-10	5 October 2023	2022 Asian Games	(China) Hangzhou
Win	6-4	Tsogt-Ochiryn Namuuntsetseg (MGL)	5-1	5 October 2023	2022 Asian Games	(China) Hangzhou
Win	5-4	Manlika Esati (THA)	10-0	5 October 2023	2022 Asian Games	(China) Hangzhou
(bronze) Bronze Medal at 50 kg
Loss	4-4	Madison Parks (CAN)	6-9	6 August 2022	2022 Commonwealth Games	(Serbia) Birmingham
Win	4-3	Christelle Letchdijio (SCO)	12-2	6 August 2022	2022 Commonwealth Games	(Serbia) Birmingham
Win	3-3	Rebecca Muambo (CMR)	5-0	6 August 2022	2022 Commonwealth Games	(Serbia) Birmingham
Win	2-3	Christelle Letchdijio (SCO)	12-2	6 August 2022	2022 Commonwealth Games	(Serbia) Birmingham
6th at 53 kg
Loss	1-3	Leyla Gurbanova (AZE)	2-7	3 June 2022	2022 Bolat Turlykhanov Cup	Almaty, Kazakhstan
Tied 5th at 53 kg
Loss	1-2	Bat-Ochiryn Bolortuyaa (MGL)	1-11	26 February 2022	2022 Yasar Dogu Tournament	(Turkey) Istanbul
Loss	1-1	Dominique Parrish (USA)	2-6, Fall	26 February 2022	2022 Yasar Dogu Tournament	(Turkey) Istanbul
Win	1-0	Aktenge Keunimjaeva (KAZ)	8-1	26 February 2022	2022 Yasar Dogu Tournament	(Turkey) Istanbul
