= 2018 World Wrestling Championships – Women's freestyle 50 kg =

Women's freestyle 50 kg at the 2018 World Championships
- Venue: László Papp Budapest Sports Arena
- Dates: 24–25 October 2018
- Competitors: 23 from 23 nations

Medalists
gold medal	Yui Susaki	Japan
silver medal	Mariya Stadnik	Azerbaijan
bronze medal	Oksana Livach	Ukraine
bronze medal	Sun Yanan	China

The women's freestyle 50 kilograms is a competition featured at the 2018 World Wrestling Championships, and was held in Budapest, Hungary on 24 and 25 October.

This freestyle wrestling competition consists of a single-elimination tournament, with a repechage used to determine the winner of two bronze medals. The two finalists face off for gold and silver medals. Each wrestler who loses to one of the two finalists moves into the repechage, culminating in a pair of bronze medal matches featuring the semifinal losers each facing the remaining repechage opponent from their half of the bracket.

== Results ==
Legend

- F — Won by fall
- WO — Won by walkover

=== Final ===
Final
Yui Susaki (JPN)	10
Mariya Stadnik (AZE)	0

=== Top half ===
Round of 32
Jessica MacDonald (CAN)	1
Oksana Livach (UKR)	5

Round of 16
Alina Vuc (ROU)	0
Yui Susaki (JPN)	6^{F}
Nguyễn Thị Xuân (VIE)	0
Ritu Phogat (IND)	10
Evin Demirhan (TUR)
Erdenesükhiin Narangerel (MGL)	WO
Valentina Islamova (KAZ)	2
Oksana Livach (UKR)	4

Quarterfinals
Yui Susaki (JPN)	11
Ritu Phogat (IND)	0
Erdenesükhiin Narangerel (MGL)	3
Oksana Livach (UKR)	10^{F}

Semifinals
Yui Susaki (JPN)	10
Oksana Livach (UKR)	0

=== Bottom half ===
Round of 32
Chiu Jo-cih (TPE)	0
Kim Son-hyang (PRK)	10
Oleksandra Kogut (AUT)	1
Kim Hyung-joo (KOR)	1
Kseniya Stankevich (BLR)	4^{F}
Jessica Blaszka (NED)	9
Sun Yanan (CHN)	2^{F}
Carolina Castillo (COL)	1
Anzhelika Vetoshkina (RUS)	6
Iwona Matkowska (POL)	1
Fredrika Petersson (SWE)	4^{F}
Alexandra Köteles (HUN)	2

Round of 16
Whitney Conder (USA)	2
Kim Son-hyang (PRK)	7
Oleksandra Kogut (AUT)	6
Kseniya Stankevich (BLR)	10
Sun Yanan (CHN)	11
Anzhelika Vetoshkina (RUS)	0
Fredrika Petersson (SWE)	0
Mariya Stadnik (AZE)	10

Quarterfinals
Kim Son-hyang (PRK)	11
Kseniya Stankevich (BLR)	0
Sun Yanan (CHN)	0
Mariya Stadnik (AZE)	10

Semifinals
Kim Son-hyang (PRK)	2
Mariya Stadnik (AZE)	4

=== Repechage ===
Repechage round 2
Alina Vuc (ROU)	8
Ritu Phogat (IND)	8
Fredrika Petersson (SWE)	0
Sun Yanan (CHN)	10

Bronze medals
Ritu Phogat (IND)	5
Oksana Livach (UKR)	10
Sun Yanan (CHN)	10
Kim Son-hyang (PRK)	0
