= 2013 World Wrestling Championships – Women's freestyle 48 kg =

Women's freestyle 48 kg at the 2013 World Championships
- Venue: László Papp Budapest Sports Arena
- Dates: 18 September 2013
- Competitors: 29 from 29 nations

Medalists
| gold medal | Eri Tosaka | Japan |
| silver medal | Mayelis Caripá | Venezuela |
| bronze medal | Xu Cheng | China |
| bronze medal | Alyssa Lampe | United States |

The women's freestyle 48 kilograms is a competition featured at the 2013 World Wrestling Championships, and was held at the László Papp Budapest Sports Arena in Budapest, Hungary on 18 September 2013.

This freestyle wrestling competition consisted of a single-elimination tournament, with a repechage used to determine the winners of two bronze medals.

== Results ==
Legend

- F — Won by fall

=== Final ===
| Final |
| Mayelis Caripá (VEN) | 0 |
| Eri Tosaka (JPN) | 7 |

=== Top half ===
Round of 32
Tsogtbazaryn Enkhjargal (MGL) | 9
Mariya Livach (UKR) | 2
Alina Ryzhova (BLR) | 2
Thalía Mallqui (PER) | 6
Vũ Thị Hằng (VIE) | 0
Pak Yong-mi (PRK) | 4^{F}
Anna Łukasiak (POL) | 7
Elitsa Yankova (BUL) | 0
Yana Stadnik (GBR) | 6^{F}
Anzhela Dorogan (AZE) | 2

Round of 16
Xu Cheng (CHN) | 6
Mayelis Caripá (VEN) | 10
Rebecca Muambo (CMR) | 1
Tsogtbazaryn Enkhjargal (MGL) | 7
Thalía Mallqui (PER) | 10
Pak Yong-mi (PRK) | 12
Anna Łukasiak (POL) | 11
Yana Stadnik (GBR) | 4

Quarterfinals
Mayelis Caripá (VEN) | 8^{F}
Tsogtbazaryn Enkhjargal (MGL) | 9
Pak Yong-mi (PRK) | 2
Anna Łukasiak (POL) | 7

Semifinals
Mayelis Caripá (VEN) | 6
Anna Łukasiak (POL) | 0

=== Bottom half ===
Round of 32
Elena Vostrikova (RUS) | 5
Natasha Kramble (CAN) | 0
Carolina Castillo (COL) | 6
Kang Eun-ju (KOR) | 3
Laura Peredo (MEX) | 5
Mélanie Lesaffre (FRA) | 7
Silvia Felice (ITA) | 6
Jaqueline Schellin (GER) | 5
Alyssa Lampe (USA) | 7
Nirmala Devi (IND) | 0
Mădălina Linguraru (ROU) | 0
Eri Tosaka (JPN) | 6^{F}
Mercédesz Dénes (HUN) | 0
Patricia Bermúdez (ARG) | 4
Evin Demirhan (TUR) | 0
Tatyana Amanzhol (KAZ) | 7

Round of 16
Elena Vostrikova (RUS) | 5
Carolina Castillo (COL) | 2
Mélanie Lesaffre (FRA) | 8
Silvia Felice (ITA) | 3
Alyssa Lampe (USA) | 0
Eri Tosaka (JPN) | 8
Patricia Bermúdez (ARG) | 0
Tatyana Amanzhol (KAZ) | 8

Quarterfinals
Elena Vostrikova (RUS) | 5
Mélanie Lesaffre (FRA) | 8
Eri Tosaka (JPN) | 11
Tatyana Amanzhol (KAZ) | 7

Semifinals
Mélanie Lesaffre (FRA) | 3
Eri Tosaka (JPN) | 7^{F}

=== Repechage ===
Repechage round 1
Mădălina Linguraru (ROU) | 0
Alyssa Lampe (USA) | 7

Repechage round 2
Xu Cheng (CHN) | 9
Tsogtbazaryn Enkhjargal (MGL) | 0
Alyssa Lampe (USA) | 8
Tatyana Amanzhol (KAZ) | 1

Bronze medals
Xu Cheng (CHN) | 8
Anna Łukasiak (POL) | 0
Alyssa Lampe (USA) | 6^{F}
Mélanie Lesaffre (FRA) | 0
