= Wrestling at the 2015 European Games – Women's freestyle 48 kg =

Women's freestyle 48 kg at the 2015 European Games
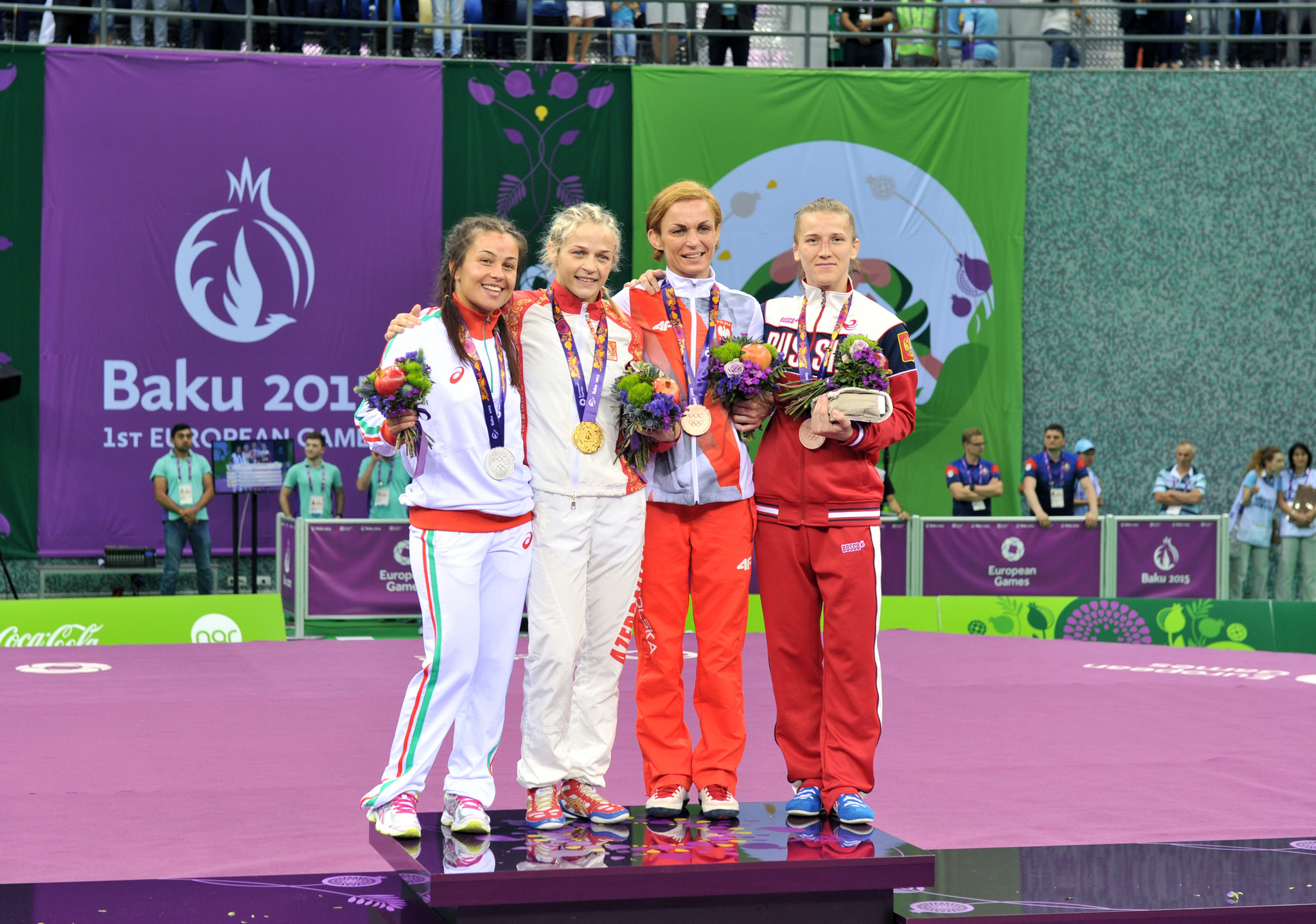
- Medal winners
- Venue: Heydar Aliyev Arena
- Date: 15 June
- Competitors: 24 from 24 nations

Medalists
gold medal	Mariya Stadnyk	Azerbaijan
silver medal	Elitsa Yankova	Bulgaria
bronze medal	Iwona Matkowska	Poland
bronze medal	Valentina Islamova	Russia

Women's freestyle 48 kg competition at the 2015 European Games in Baku, Azerbaijan, took place on 15 June at the Heydar Aliyev Arena.

== Schedule ==
All times are Azerbaijan Summer Time (UTC+05:00)

Date	Time	Event
Monday, 15 June 2015	10:00	Qualifications
Monday, 15 June 2015	11:00	1/8 finals
Monday, 15 June 2015	13:00	Quarterfinals
Monday, 15 June 2015	13:00	Semifinals
Monday, 15 June 2015	15:00	Repechage
Monday, 15 June 2015	19:00	Finals

== Results ==
Legend

- F — Won by fall

=== Final ===
Final
(Azerbaijan) Mariya Stadnyk (AZE)	12
(Bulgaria) Elitsa Yankova (BUL)	1

=== Top half ===
Qualifications

1/8 finals
(Netherlands) Jessica Blaszka (NED)	9
(Latvia) Karalina Tjapko (LAT)	5
(Poland) Iwona Matkowska (POL)	4
(Romania) Alina Vuc (ROU)	0
(Azerbaijan) Mariya Stadnyk (AZE)	12
(Portugal) Liliana Santos (POR)	2
(Belarus) Vanesa Kaladzinskaya (BLR)	0
(France) Julie Sabatié (FRA)	7

Quarterfinals
(Netherlands) Jessica Blaszka (NED)	0
(Poland) Iwona Matkowska (POL)	7
(Azerbaijan) Mariya Stadnyk (AZE)	11
(France) Julie Sabatié (FRA)	0

Semifinals
(Poland) Iwona Matkowska (POL)	2
(Azerbaijan) Mariya Stadnyk (AZE)	8^{F}

=== Bottom half ===
Qualifications
(Ukraine) Oleksandra Kogut (UKR)	14
(United Kingdom) Yana Rattigan (GBR)	4

1/8 finals
(Moldova) Iulia Leorda (MDA)	1
(Russia) Valentina Islamova (RUS)	12^{F}
(Slovakia) Lenka Matejová (SVK)	4
(Turkey) Evin Demirhan (TUR)	5^{F}
(Spain) Eugenia Bustabad (ESP)	0
(Bulgaria) Elitsa Yankova (BUL)	12
(Germany) Jaqueline Schellin (GER)	3
(Ukraine) Oleksandra Kogut (UKR)	2

Quarterfinals
(Russia) Valentina Islamova (RUS)	10
(Turkey) Evin Demirhan (TUR)	0
(Bulgaria) Elitsa Yankova (BUL)	5
(Germany) Jaqueline Schellin (GER)	2

Semifinals
(Russia) Valentina Islamova (RUS)	8
(Bulgaria) Elitsa Yankova (BUL)	8

=== Repechage ===
Repechage round 1
(Portugal) Liliana Santos (POR)	0
(France) Julie Sabatié (FRA)	7
(Spain) Eugenia Bustabad (ESP)	3
(Germany) Jaqueline Schellin (GER)	4

Bronze medal match
(France) Julie Sabatié (FRA)	0
(Poland) Iwona Matkowska (POL)	8
(Germany) Jaqueline Schellin (GER)	1
(Russia) Valentina Islamova (RUS)	11
