= 2019 World Wrestling Championships – Women's freestyle 50 kg =

Women's freestyle 50 kg at the 2019 World Championships
- Venue: Barys Arena
- Dates: 17–18 September 2019
- Competitors: 29 from 29 nations

Medalists
gold medal	Mariya Stadnik	Azerbaijan
silver medal	Alina Vuc	Romania
bronze medal	Valentina Islamova	Kazakhstan
bronze medal	Ekaterina Poleshchuk	Russia

The women's freestyle 50 kilograms is a competition featured at the 2019 World Wrestling Championships, and was held in Nur-Sultan, Kazakhstan on 17 and 18 September.

This freestyle wrestling competition consists of a single-elimination tournament, with a repechage used to determine the winner of two bronze medals. The two finalists face off for gold and silver medals. Each wrestler who loses to one of the two finalists moves into the repechage, culminating in a pair of bronze medal matches featuring the semifinal losers each facing the remaining repechage opponent from their half of the bracket.

== Results ==
Legend

- F — Won by fall
- R — Retired

=== Final ===
Final
Alina Vuc (ROU)	0
Mariya Stadnik (AZE)	13

=== Top half ===
Round of 32
Dauletbike Yakhshimuratova (UZB)	9
Emilia Cîrîcu (MDA)	6
Ellen Riesterer (GER)	2
Alina Vuc (ROU)	4
Jade Dufour (CAN)	6
Hsieh Meng-hsuan (TPE)	10
Mia-Lahnee Aquino (GUM)	0
Kseniya Stankevich (BLR)	10
Valentina Islamova (KAZ)	11
Julie Sabatié (FRA)	0
Nguyễn Thị Xuân (VIE)	4
Oh Hyun-young (KOR)	6
Kamila Barbosa (BRA)	1
Evin Demirhan (TUR)	6

Round of 16
Oksana Livach (UKR)	6^{F}
Dauletbike Yakhshimuratova (UZB)	0
Alina Vuc (ROU)	4^{F}
Hsieh Meng-hsuan (TPE)	0
Kseniya Stankevich (BLR)	0
Valentina Islamova (KAZ)	12
Oh Hyun-young (KOR)	0
Evin Demirhan (TUR)	7^{F}

Quarterfinals
Oksana Livach (UKR)	1
Alina Vuc (ROU)	6
Valentina Islamova (KAZ)	13
Evin Demirhan (TUR)	2

Semifinals
Alina Vuc (ROU)	6
Valentina Islamova (KAZ)	6

=== Bottom half ===
Round of 32
Kim Son-hyang (PRK)	6
Whitney Conder (USA)	0
Iwona Matkowska (POL)	3
Carolina Castillo (COL)	1
Yusneylys Guzmán (CUB)	0
Yuki Irie (JPN)	10
Fredrika Petersson (SWE)	4^{F}
Miglena Selishka (BUL)	9
Ekaterina Poleshchuk (RUS)	9
Tsogt-Ochiryn Namuuntsetseg (MGL)	7
Mercy Genesis (NGR)	0
Mariya Stadnik (AZE)	10

Round of 16
Sun Yanan (CHN)	5
Kim Son-hyang (PRK)	2
Iwona Matkowska (POL)	0
Yuki Irie (JPN)	5
Fredrika Petersson (SWE)	1^{R}
Ekaterina Poleshchuk (RUS)	8
Mariya Stadnik (AZE)	9
Seema Bisla (IND)	2

Quarterfinals
Sun Yanan (CHN)	13
Yuki Irie (JPN)	12
Ekaterina Poleshchuk (RUS)	0
Mariya Stadnik (AZE)	11

Semifinals
Sun Yanan (CHN)	4
Mariya Stadnik (AZE)	6

=== Repechage ===
Repechage round 1
Ellen Riesterer (GER)	4^{F}
Hsieh Meng-hsuan (TPE)	0
Mercy Genesis (NGR)	9
Seema Bisla (IND)	9

Repechage round 2
Ellen Riesterer (GER)	4
Oksana Livach (UKR)	5
Seema Bisla (IND)	3
Ekaterina Poleshchuk (RUS)	11

Bronze medals
Oksana Livach (UKR)	0
Valentina Islamova (KAZ)	5^{F}
Ekaterina Poleshchuk (RUS)	9
Sun Yanan (CHN)	9
