= Wrestling at the 2022 Asian Games – Women's freestyle 50 kg =

Women's freestyle 50 kg at the 2022 Asian Games
- Venue: Lin'an Sports and Culture Centre
- Date: 5 October 2023
- Competitors: 13 from 13 nations

Medalists
gold medal	Remina Yoshimoto	Japan
silver medal	Kim Son-hyang	North Korea
bronze medal	Zhu Jiang	China
bronze medal	Aktenge Keunimjaeva	Uzbekistan

The women's freestyle 50 kilograms wrestling competition at the 2022 Asian Games in Hangzhou was held on 5 October 2023 at the Lin'an Sports and Culture Centre.

This freestyle wrestling competition consists of a single-elimination tournament, with a repechage used to determine the winner of two bronze medals. The two finalists face off for gold and silver medals. Each wrestler who loses to one of the two finalists moves into the repechage, culminating in a pair of bronze medal matches featuring the semifinal losers each facing the remaining repechage opponent from their half of the bracket.

== Schedule ==
All times are China Standard Time (UTC+08:00)

Date	Time	Event
Thursday, 5 October 2023	10:00	1/8 finals
Thursday, 5 October 2023	10:00	1/4 finals
Thursday, 5 October 2023	10:00	Semifinals
Thursday, 5 October 2023	10:00	Repechages
Thursday, 5 October 2023	17:00	Finals

== Results ==
Legend

- F — Won by fall
- WO — Won by walkover

=== Main bracket ===
1/8 finals
Kim Son-hyang (PRK)	10
Nguyễn Thị Xuân (VIE)	0
Chen Yi-jing (TPE)	2
Jiah Pingot (PHI)	0
Svetlana Ankicheva (KAZ)	1
Cheon Mi-ran (KOR)	2
Pooja Gehlot (IND)	10
Manlika Esati (THA)	0
Remina Yoshimoto (JPN)	10
Dit Samnang (CAM)	0

1/4 finals
Zhu Jiang (CHN)	0
Kim Son-hyang (PRK)	8
Chen Yi-jing (TPE)	3
Cheon Mi-ran (KOR)	6
Tsogt-Ochiryn Namuuntsetseg (MGL)	1
Pooja Gehlot (IND)	5
Remina Yoshimoto (JPN)	14^{F}
Aktenge Keunimjaeva (UZB)	3

Semifinals
Kim Son-hyang (PRK)	10
Cheon Mi-ran (KOR)	0
Pooja Gehlot (IND)	0
Remina Yoshimoto (JPN)	10

Gold medal match
Kim Son-hyang (PRK)	4
Remina Yoshimoto (JPN)	5

=== Repechage ===
Repechage round 1
Nguyễn Thị Xuân (VIE)	0
Zhu Jiang (CHN)	10
Dit Samnang (CAM)
Aktenge Keunimjaeva (UZB)	WO

Bronze medal matches
Zhu Jiang (CHN)	9^{F}
Cheon Mi-ran (KOR)	0
Aktenge Keunimjaeva (UZB)	9
Pooja Gehlot (IND)	2

== Final standing ==
Rank	Athlete
1st place, gold medalist(s)	Remina Yoshimoto (JPN)
2nd place, silver medalist(s)	Kim Son-hyang (PRK)
3rd place, bronze medalist(s)	Zhu Jiang (CHN)
3rd place, bronze medalist(s)	Aktenge Keunimjaeva (UZB)
5	Cheon Mi-ran (KOR)
5	Pooja Gehlot (IND)
7	Chen Yi-jing (TPE)
8	Svetlana Ankicheva (KAZ)
9	Tsogt-Ochiryn Namuuntsetseg (MGL)
10	Jiah Pingot (PHI)
11	Manlika Esati (THA)
12	Nguyễn Thị Xuân (VIE)
—	Dit Samnang (CAM)
