= Wrestling at the 2020 Summer Olympics – Women's freestyle 50 kg =

Women's freestyle 50 kg at the Games of the XXXII Olympiad
- Venue: Makuhari Messe
- Date: 6–7 August 2021
- Competitors: 16 from 16 nations

Medalists
1st place, gold medalist(s)		Yui Susaki	Japan
2nd place, silver medalist(s)		Sun Yanan	China
3rd place, bronze medalist(s)		Mariya Stadnik	Azerbaijan
3rd place, bronze medalist(s)		Sarah Hildebrandt	United States

The women's freestyle 50 kilograms competition at the 2020 Summer Olympics in Tokyo, Japan, took place on 6–7 August 2021 at the Makuhari Messe in Mihama-ku.

This freestyle wrestling competition consists of a single-elimination tournament, with a repechage used to determine the winner of two bronze medals. The two finalists face off for gold and silver medals. Each wrestler who loses to one of the two finalists moves into the repechage, culminating in a pair of bronze medal matches featuring the semifinal losers each facing the remaining repechage opponent from their half of the bracket.

== Schedule ==
All times are Japan Standard Time (UTC+9:00)

Date	Time	Event
6 August 2021	11:00	Qualification rounds
6 August 2021	18:15	Semifinals
7 August 2021	18:45	Repechage
7 August 2021	19:30	Finals

== Results ==
Legend

- F — Won by fall
- WO — Won by walkover

=== Main bracket ===
1/8 finals
Mariya Stadnik (AZE)	11
Stalvira Orshush (ROC)	7
Sarra Hamdi (TUN)	3
Seema Bisla (IND)	1
Yui Susaki (JPN)	10
Tsogt-Ochiryn Namuuntsetseg (MGL)	0
Lucía Yépez (ECU)	9
Valentina Islamova (KAZ)	6
Oksana Livach (UKR)	10
Adijat Idris (NGR)	0
Yusneylys Guzmán (CUB)	2
Sun Yanan (CHN)	8
Evin Demirhan (TUR)	0
Sarah Hildebrandt (USA)	11
Miglena Selishka (BUL)	6
Alina Vuc (ROU)	0

1/4 finals
Mariya Stadnik (AZE)	10
Sarra Hamdi (TUN)	0
Yui Susaki (JPN)	10
Lucía Yépez (ECU)	0
Oksana Livach (UKR)	3
Sun Yanan (CHN)	7
Sarah Hildebrandt (USA)	12
Miglena Selishka (BUL)	2

Semifinals
Mariya Stadnik (AZE)	0
Yui Susaki (JPN)	11
Sun Yanan (CHN)	10
Sarah Hildebrandt (USA)	7

Final
Yui Susaki (JPN)	10
Sun Yanan (CHN)	0

=== Repechage ===
Repechage
Tsogt-Ochiryn Namuuntsetseg (MGL)	WO
Lucía Yépez (ECU)
Yusneylys Guzmán (CUB)	0
Oksana Livach (UKR)	6^{F}

Bronze medal matches
Tsogt-Ochiryn Namuuntsetseg (MGL)	0
Mariya Stadnik (AZE)	10
Oksana Livach (UKR)	1
Sarah Hildebrandt (USA)	12

== Final standing ==
Rank	Athlete
1st place, gold medalist(s)	Yui Susaki (JPN)
2nd place, silver medalist(s)	Sun Yanan (CHN)
3rd place, bronze medalist(s)	Mariya Stadnik (AZE)
3rd place, bronze medalist(s)	Sarah Hildebrandt (USA)
5	Tsogt-Ochiryn Namuuntsetseg (MGL)
5	Oksana Livach (UKR)
7	Miglena Selishka (BUL)
8	Lucía Yépez (ECU)
9	Sarra Hamdi (TUN)
10	Stalvira Orshush (ROC)
11	Valentina Islamova (KAZ)
12	Yusneylys Guzmán (CUB)
13	Seema Bisla (IND)
14	Alina Vuc (ROU)
15	Adijat Idris (NGR)
16	Evin Demirhan (TUR)
