= 2016 European Wrestling Championships – Women's freestyle 48 kg =

The women's freestyle 48 kg is a competition featured at the 2016 European Wrestling Championships, and was held in Riga, Latvia on March 8.

== Medalists ==
Gold	Mariya Stadnyk; Azerbaijan
Silver	Alina Vuc; Romania
Bronze	Elitsa Yankova; Bulgaria
Bronze	Maryna Markevich; Belarus

== Results ==
Legend

- F — Won by fall

=== Top half ===
==== Section 1 ====
Qualification
Liliana Costa Dos Santos (POR)	5
Evin Demirhan (TUR)	2
Sarianne Savola (FIN)	4
Silje Kippernes (NOR)	3
Alina Vuc (ROM)	10
Maryna Markevich (BLR)	9
Valentina Islamova-Brik (RUS)	10
Doina Roscovanu (MDA)	0
Mariya Stadnyk (AZE)	10
Oleksandra Kogut (UKR)	0
Yana Stadnyk (GBR)	13
Karalina TJAPKO (LAT)	2
Elitsa Yankova (BUL)	6
Anna Lukasiak (POL)	5

Quarterfinals
Eugenia Garcia (ESP)	4
Liliana Costa Dos Santos (POR)	1
Sarianne Savola (FIN)	1
Alina Vuc (ROM)	3^{F}
Valentina Islamova-Brik (RUS)	2
Mariya Stadnyk (AZE)	5
Yana Stadnyk (GBR)	0
Elitsa Yankova (BUL)	10

Semifinals
Eugenia Garcia (ESP)	1
Alina Vuc (ROM)	6^{F}
Mariya Stadnyk (AZE)	9^{F}
Elitsa Yankova (BUL)	0

Final
Alina Vuc (ROM)	0
Mariya Stadnyk (AZE)	10

=== Repechage ===
Repechage round 2
Maryna Markevich (BLR)	5
Sarianne Savola (FIN)	0
Oleksandra Kogut (UKR)	2
Valentina Islamova-Brik (RUS)	7

Bronze medals
Maryna Markevich (BLR)	4
Eugenia Garcia (ESP)	2
Valentina Islamova-Brik (RUS)	6
Elitsa Yankova (BUL)	7
