= Wrestling at the 2022 Commonwealth Games – Women's freestyle 50 kg =

Wrestling competition

Wrestling – Women's freestyle 50 kg at the 2022 Commonwealth Games
- Venue: Coventry Arena
- Dates: 6 August 2022
- Competitors: 6 from 6 nations

Medalists
gold medal	Mercy Genesis	Nigeria
silver medal	Madison Parks	Canada
bronze medal	Pooja Gehlot	India

The Women's freestyle 50 kg wrestling competitions at the 2022 Commonwealth Games in Birmingham, England took place on 6 August at the Coventry Arena. A total of six competitors from six nations took part.

== Results ==
The draw is as follows:

As there were less than 6 competitors entered in this event, the competition was contested as a Nordic round with each athlete playing every other athlete. The medallists were determined by the standings after the completion of the Nordic round.

Legend

- F — Won by fall
- WO — Won by walkover

=== Elimination groups ===
==== Group A ====
Pos	Athlete	Pld	W	L	CP	TP
1	Pooja Gehlot (IND)	2	2	0	9	12
2	Christelle Letchidjio (SCO)	2	1	1	6	2
—	Rebecca Muambo (CMR)	2	0	2	0	0

Source: UWW

	Score		CP
Pooja Gehlot (IND)	12–2	Christelle Letchidjio (SCO)	4–1 VSU1
Rebecca Muambo (CMR)	WO	Pooja Gehlot (IND)	0–5 VFO
Christelle Letchidjio (SCO)	WO	Rebecca Muambo (CMR)	5–0 VFO

==== Group B ====
Pos	Athlete	Pld	W	L	CP	TP
1	Mercy Genesis (NGR)	2	2	0	7	21
2	Madison Parks (CAN)	2	1	1	4	12
3	Shriyanthika Pedige (SRI)	2	0	2	1	1

Source: UWW

	Score		CP
Madison Parks (CAN)	0–9	Mercy Genesis (NGR)	0–3 VPO
Shriyanthika Pedige (SRI)	0–12	Madison Parks (CAN)	0–4 VSU
Mercy Genesis (NGR)	12–1	Shriyanthika Pedige (SRI)	4–1 VSU1

=== Knockout round ===
Semifinals
Pooja Gehlot (IND)	6
Madison Parks (CAN)	9
Mercy Genesis (NGR)	10
Christelle Letchidjio (SCO)	0

Finals
Madison Parks (CAN)	1
Mercy Genesis (NGR)	3^{F}
Bronze medal match
Pooja Gehlot (IND)	12
Christelle Letchidjio (SCO)	2
