= 2017 World Wrestling Championships – Women's freestyle 48 kg =

Women's freestyle 48 kg at the 2017 World Championships
- Venue: AccorHotels Arena
- Dates: 24 August 2017
- Competitors: 27 from 27 nations

Medalists
gold medal	Yui Susaki	Japan
silver medal	Alina Vuc	Romania
bronze medal	Kim Son-hyang	North Korea
bronze medal	Evin Demirhan	Turkey

The women's freestyle 48 kilograms is a competition featured at the 2017 World Wrestling Championships, and was held in Paris, France on 24 August 2017.

This freestyle wrestling competition consisted of a single-elimination tournament, with a repechage used to determine the winners of two bronze medals.

== Results ==
Legend

- F — Won by fall

=== Final ===
Final
Yui Susaki (JPN)	14
Alina Vuc (ROU)	4

=== Top half ===
Round of 32
Yui Susaki (JPN)	10
Thalía Mallqui (PER)	0
Vinesh Phogat (IND)	13
Oksana Livach (UKR)	2
Victoria Anthony (USA)	10
Cheon Mi-ran (KOR)	0

Round of 16
Patricia Bermúdez (ARG)	11
Turkan Nasirova (AZE)	8
Kim Son-hyang (PRK)	10
Fredrika Petersson (SWE)	0
Julie Sabatié (FRA)	2
Yui Susaki (JPN)	13
Vinesh Phogat (IND)	4
Victoria Anthony (USA)	6^{F}

Quarterfinals
Patricia Bermúdez (ARG)	4
Kim Son-hyang (PRK)	7
Yui Susaki (JPN)	11
Victoria Anthony (USA)	0

Semifinals
Kim Son-hyang (PRK)	2
Yui Susaki (JPN)	5

=== Bottom half ===
Round of 32
Mercy Genesis (NGR)	8
Miglena Selishka (BUL)	16
Daria Leksina (RUS)	6
Jasmine Mian (CAN)	13^{F}
Rupinder Kaur Sandhu (AUS)	0
Alina Vuc (ROU)	4^{F}
Eugenia Bustabad (ESP)	2
Viyaleta Chyryk (BLR)	7
Anna Łukasiak (POL)	8
Phạm Thị Hà Phương (VIE)	1
Zhuldyz Eshimova (KAZ)	5
Caroline Soares (BRA)	0
Evin Demirhan (TUR)	8
Qin Liuying (CHN)	6
Jessica Blaszka (NED)	12
Erdenesükhiin Narangerel (MGL)	4

Round of 16
Miglena Selishka (BUL)	2
Jasmine Mian (CAN)	12
Alina Vuc (ROU)	5^{F}
Viyaleta Chyryk (BLR)	4
Anna Łukasiak (POL)	3
Zhuldyz Eshimova (KAZ)	3
Evin Demirhan (TUR)	4
Jessica Blaszka (NED)	3

Quarterfinals
Jasmine Mian (CAN)	0
Alina Vuc (ROU)	3^{F}
Anna Łukasiak (POL)	2
Evin Demirhan (TUR)	3

Semifinals
Alina Vuc (ROU)	13
Evin Demirhan (TUR)	2

=== Repechage ===
Repechage round 1
Thalía Mallqui (PER)	4
Julie Sabatié (FRA)	2^{F}
Rupinder Kaur Sandhu (AUS)	0
Viyaleta Chyryk (BLR)	10

Repechage round 2
Julie Sabatié (FRA)	0
Victoria Anthony (USA)	9^{F}
Viyaleta Chyryk (BLR)	4
Jasmine Mian (CAN)	2

Bronze medals
Victoria Anthony (USA)	1
Kim Son-hyang (PRK)	11
Viyaleta Chyryk (BLR)	1
Evin Demirhan (TUR)	3
