= Wrestling at the 2016 Summer Olympics – Women's freestyle 48 kg =

Women's freestyle 48 kg at the Games of the XXXI Olympiad
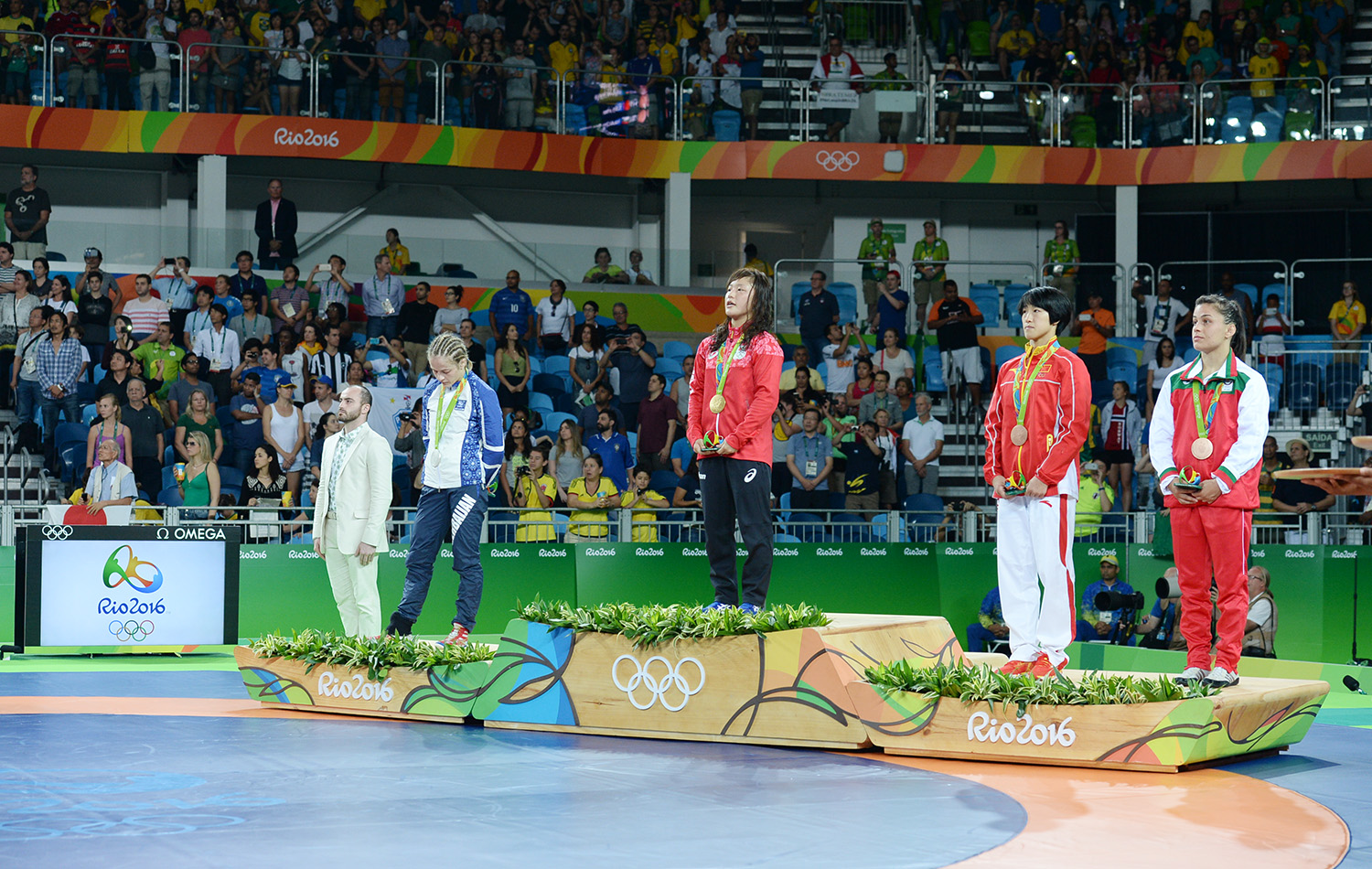
- Medalists
- Venue: Carioca Arena 2
- Date: 17 August 2016
- Competitors: 18 from 18 nations

Medalists
1st place, gold medalist(s)		Eri Tosaka	Japan
2nd place, silver medalist(s)		Mariya Stadnik	Azerbaijan
3rd place, bronze medalist(s)		Sun Yanan	China
3rd place, bronze medalist(s)		Elitsa Yankova	Bulgaria

Women's freestyle 48 kilograms competition at the 2016 Summer Olympics in Rio de Janeiro, Brazil, took place on August 17 at the Carioca Arena 2 in Barra da Tijuca.

This freestyle wrestling competition consists of a single-elimination tournament, with a repechage used to determine the winner of two bronze medals. The two finalists face off for gold and silver medals. Each wrestler who loses to one of the two finalists moves into the repechage, culminating in a pair of bronze medal matches featuring the semifinal losers each facing the remaining repechage opponent from their half of the bracket.

The medals for the competition were presented by Poul-Erik Høyer Larsen, IOC member, Denmark, and the gifts were presented by Natalia Yariguina, United World Wrestling vice president.

== Schedule ==
All times are Brasília Standard Time (UTC−03:00)

Date	Time	Event
17 August 2016	10:00	Qualification rounds
17 August 2016	16:00	Repechage
17 August 2016	17:00	Finals

== Results ==
Legend

- F — Won by fall
- R — Retired

=== Final ===
Final
Eri Tosaka (JPN)	3
Mariya Stadnik (AZE)	2

=== Top half ===
Qualifications

1/8 finals
Eri Tosaka (JPN)	6
Zhuldyz Eshimova (KAZ)	0
Jessica Blaszka (NED)	0
Haley Augello (USA)	7
Vinesh Phogat (IND)	11
Alina Vuc (ROU)	0
Sun Yanan (CHN)	14
Jasmine Mian (CAN)	4

1/4 finals
Eri Tosaka (JPN)	11
Haley Augello (USA)	2
Vinesh Phogat (IND)	1^{R}
Sun Yanan (CHN)	2

Semifinals
Eri Tosaka (JPN)	8
Sun Yanan (CHN)	3

=== Bottom half ===
Qualifications
Milana Dadasheva (RUS)	6
Kim Hyon-gyong (PRK)	2
Elitsa Yankova (BUL)	10
Rebecca Muambo (CMR)	0

1/8 finals
Mariya Stadnik (AZE)	10
Patricia Bermúdez (ARG)	0
Iwona Matkowska (POL)	4^{F}
Mercy Genesis (NGR)	0
Chov Sotheara (CAM)	0
Carolina Castillo (COL)	10
Milana Dadasheva (RUS)	6
Elitsa Yankova (BUL)	9

1/4 finals
Mariya Stadnik (AZE)	10
Iwona Matkowska (POL)	0
Carolina Castillo (COL)	2
Elitsa Yankova (BUL)	3

Semifinals
Mariya Stadnik (AZE)	6^{F}
Elitsa Yankova (BUL)	0

=== Repechage ===
Repechage round 2
Zhuldyz Eshimova (KAZ)	3
Haley Augello (USA)	2
Patricia Bermúdez (ARG)	6
Iwona Matkowska (POL)	3

Bronze medals
Zhuldyz Eshimova (KAZ)	0
Sun Yanan (CHN)	10
Patricia Bermúdez (ARG)	6
Elitsa Yankova (BUL)	7

== Final standing ==
Rank	Athlete
1st place, gold medalist(s)	Eri Tosaka (JPN)
2nd place, silver medalist(s)	Mariya Stadnik (AZE)
3rd place, bronze medalist(s)	Sun Yanan (CHN)
3rd place, bronze medalist(s)	Elitsa Yankova (BUL)
5	Zhuldyz Eshimova (KAZ)
5	Patricia Bermúdez (ARG)
7	Iwona Matkowska (POL)
8	Carolina Castillo (COL)
9	Haley Augello (USA)
10	Vinesh Phogat (IND)
11	Milana Dadasheva (RUS)
12	Jasmine Mian (CAN)
13	Kim Hyon-gyong (PRK)
14	Mercy Genesis (NGR)
15	Jessica Blaszka (NED)
16	Chov Sotheara (CAM)
16	Rebecca Muambo (CMR)
18	Alina Vuc (ROU)
