= Aktenge Keunimjaeva =

Uzbek freestyle wrestler

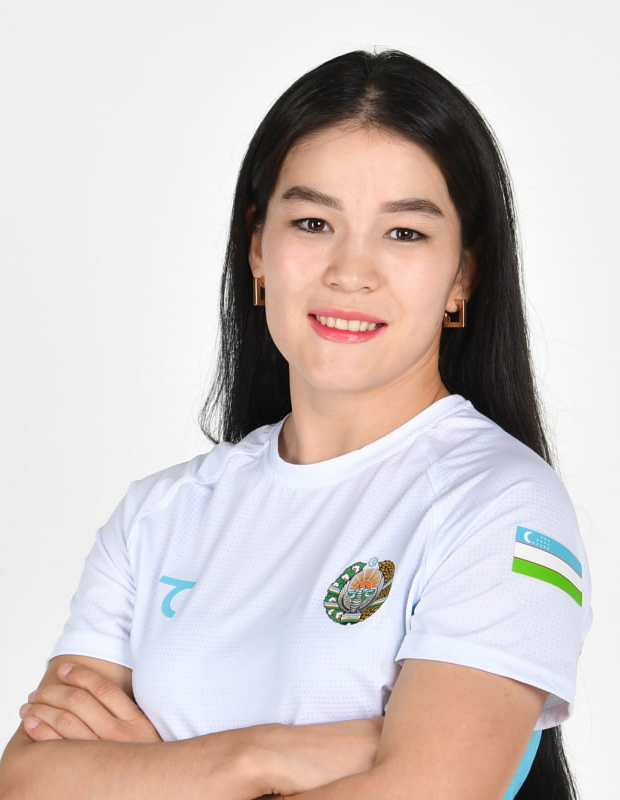
- Keunimjaeva in 2023

Personal information
- Born: 19 September 1999 (age 27) Karakalpakstan, Uzbekistan

Sport
- Country: Uzbekistan
- Sport: Amateur wrestling
- Weight class: 50 kg; 53 kg
- Event: Freestyle
Medal record
Women's freestyle wrestling
Representing Uzbekistan
Asian Championships
Bronze medal – third place	2019 Xi'an	53 kg
Bronze medal – third place	2020 New Delhi	53 kg
Bronze medal – third place	2023 Astana	53 kg
Bronze medal – third place	2026 Bishkek	50 kg
Asian Games
Bronze medal – third place	2022 Hangzhou	50 kg
Islamic Solidarity Games
Gold medal – first place	2025 Riyadh	50 kg
Silver medal – second place	2021 Konya	53 kg
Yasar Dogu Tournament
Gold medal – first place	2025 Kocaeli	50 kg
Golden Grand Prix Ivan Yarygin
Bronze medal – third place	2026 Krasnoyarsk	50 kg
Grand Prix
Bronze medal – third place	2018 Wenzhou	50 kg
Bronze medal – third place	2022 Almaty	53 kg
Asian U23 Championships
Gold medal – first place	2022 Bishkek	53 kg
World Juniors Championships
Silver medal – second place	2018 Trnava	53 kg
Asian Junior Championships
Bronze medal – third place	2017 Taichung	48 kg
Asian Cadet Championships
Bronze medal – third place	2014 Bangkok	43 kg
Bronze medal – third place	2015 New Delhi	46 kg

Aktenge Keunimjaeva (born 19 September 1999) is an Uzbek freestyle wrestler. She is a three-time bronze medalist at the Asian Wrestling Championships. She is also a gold medalist at the 2025 Islamic Solidarity Games held in Riyadh, Saudi Arabia and a bronze medalist at the 2022 Asian Games held in Hangzhou, China. Keunimjaeva represented Uzbekistan at the 2024 Summer Olympics in Paris, France.

== Career ==
In 2019, Keunimjaeva competed in the women's freestyle 53 kg event at the World Wrestling Championships held in Nur-Sultan, Kazakhstan. She was eliminated in her first match by Lianna Montero of Cuba.

Keunimjaeva competed at the 2021 Asian Wrestling Olympic Qualification Tournament held in Almaty, Kazakhstan. She lost both her matches and she did not qualify for the 2020 Summer Olympics in Tokyo, Japan.

In 2022, Keunimjaeva competed at the Yasar Dogu Tournament held in Istanbul, Turkey. She won the silver medal in the 53 kg event at the 2021 Islamic Solidarity Games held in Konya, Turkey. She competed in the 53 kg event at the 2022 World Wrestling Championships held in Belgrade, Serbia.

She won one of the bronze medals in the women's 50 kg event at the 2022 Asian Games held in Hangzhou, China. She defeated Pooja Gehlot of India in her bronze medal match.

Keunimjaeva competed at the 2024 Asian Wrestling Olympic Qualification Tournament in Bishkek, Kyrgyzstan and she earned a quota place for Uzbekistan for the 2024 Summer Olympics in Paris, France. She competed in the women's 50 kg event at the Olympics. She was eliminated in her first match by Oksana Livach of Ukraine.

In January 2025, she finished with bronze medal at the Ivan Yarygin tournament in Krasnoyarsk, Siberia, Russia.

== Achievements ==
Year	Tournament	Location	Result	Event
2019	Asian Championships	Xi'an, China	3rd	Freestyle 53 kg
2020	Asian Championships	New Delhi, India	3rd	Freestyle 53 kg
2022	Islamic Solidarity Games	Konya, Turkey	2nd	Freestyle 53 kg
2023	Asian Championships	Astana, Kazakhstan	3rd	Freestyle 53 kg
2023	Asian Games	Hangzhou, China	3rd	Freestyle 50 kg
2025	Islamic Solidarity Games	Riyadh, Saudi Arabia	1st	Freestyle 50 kg
