= Wrestling at the 2014 Commonwealth Games – Women's freestyle 48 kg =

Wrestling – Women's freestyle 48 kg at the 2014 Commonwealth Games
- Venue: Scottish Exhibition and Conference Centre
- Dates: 29 July 2014
- Competitors: 7 from 6 nations

Medalists
gold medal	Vinesh Phogat	India
silver medal	Yana Rattigan	England
bronze medal	Jasmine Mian	Canada
bronze medal	Rebecca Muambo	Cameroon

The women's 48 kg freestyle wrestling competitions at the 2014 Commonwealth Games in Glasgow, Scotland was held on 29 July at the Scottish Exhibition and Conference Centre.

This freestyle wrestling competition consists of a single-elimination tournament, with a repechage used to determine the winner of two bronze medals. The two finalists face off for gold and silver medals. Each wrestler who loses to one of the two finalists moves into the repechage, culminating in a pair of bronze medal matches featuring the semifinal losers each facing the remaining repechage opponent from their half of the bracket.

== Results ==
Results:

Legend

- F — Won by fall

=== Main bracket ===
Quarterfinals
Rosemary Nweke (NGR)	1
Vinesh Phogat (IND)	7
Donna Robertson (SCO)	0
Rebecca Muambo (CMR)
Fiona Robertson (SCO)	0
Yana Rattigan (ENG)	4^{F}

Semifinals
Jasmine Mian (CAN)	1
Vinesh Phogat (IND)	12
Rebecca Muambo (CMR)	0
Yana Rattigan (ENG)	4^{F}

Finals
Vinesh Phogat (IND)	11
Yana Rattigan (ENG)	8

=== Repechage ===
Bronze medal match
Rosemary Nweke (NGR)	2
Jasmine Mian (CAN)	13
Fiona Robertson (SCO)	0
Rebecca Muambo (CMR)	10
