= Wrestling at the 2022 Commonwealth Games – Women's freestyle 76 kg =

Wrestling competition

Wrestling – Women's freestyle 76 kg at the 2022 Commonwealth Games
- Venue: Coventry Arena
- Dates: 6 August 2022
- Competitors: 8 from 8 nations

Medalists
gold medal	Justina Di Stasio	Canada
silver medal	Hannah Rueben	Nigeria
bronze medal	Pooja Sihag	India
bronze medal	Georgina Nelthorpe	England

The Women's freestyle 76 kg wrestling competitions at the 2022 Commonwealth Games in Birmingham, England took place on 6 August at the Coventry Arena. A total of eight competitors from eight nations took part.

This freestyle wrestling competition consists of a single-elimination tournament, with a repechage used to determine the winner of two bronze medals. The two finalists face off for gold and silver medals. Each wrestler who loses to one of the two finalists moves into the repechage, culminating in a pair of bronze medal matches featuring the semifinal losers each facing the remaining repechage opponent from their half of the bracket.

== Results ==
The draw is as follows:

Legend

- F — Won by fall

=== Main bracket ===
Quarterfinals		Semifinals		Final
Michelle Montague (NZL)	3
Pooja Sihag (IND)	5	Pooja Sihag (IND)	0
Justina Di Stasio (CAN)	10	Justina Di Stasio (CAN)	6
Naomi de Bruine (AUS)	0			Justina Di Stasio (CAN)	4
Marie Vilbrun (MRI)	0			Hannah Rueben (NGR)	2
Georgina Nelthorpe (ENG)	6^{F}	Georgina Nelthorpe (ENG)	1
Hannah Rueben (NGR)	10	Hannah Rueben (NGR)	6
Madusu Koroma (SLE)	0

=== Repechage ===
Bronze medal matches
Naomi de Bruine (AUS)	0
Pooja Sihag (IND)	11
Madusu Koroma (SLE)	0
Georgina Nelthorpe (ENG)	4^{F}
