= Mehdi Bali =

Iranian Greco-Roman wrestler

Personal information
- Native name: مهدی بالی
- Born: 20 July 1997 (age 29) Nowshahr, Iran
- Height: 1.81 m (5 ft 11 in)
- Weight: 97 kg (214 lb; 15.3 st)

Sport
- Country: Iran
- Sport: Greco-Roman
- Event: 97 kg
Medal record
Men's Greco-Roman wrestling
Representing Iran
Asian Championships
Gold medal – first place	2021 Almaty	97 kg
Gold medal – first place	2022 Ulaanbaatar	97 kg
Gold medal – first place	2023 Astana	97 kg
Asian Games
Bronze medal – third place	2026 Aichi–Nagoya	97 kg
World Cup
Gold medal – first place	2022 Baku	Team
Islamic Solidarity Games
Bronze medal – third place	2021 Konya	97 kg
World Military Championships
Silver medal – second place	2021 Tehran	97 kg
Bronze medal – third place	2023 Baku	97 kg
Vehbi Emre & Hamit Kaplan Tournament
Silver medal – second place	2024 Antalya	97 kg
Grand Prix
Silver medal – second place	2021 Warsaw	97 kg
Silver medal – second place	2021 Kyiv	97 kg
Asian Juniors Championships
Gold medal – first place	2017 Taichung	84 kg

Mehdi Bali (born 20 July 1997) is an Iranian Greco-Roman wrestler competing in the 97 kg division.

== Career ==
At the 2023 Asian Championships, in the 97 kg category, Mehdi Bali won 7–5 against Utah Nara of Japan after a break in the first round, in the second round and in the quarterfinals to advance to the semi-finals. He won 7–1 against Yaming Li of China and made it to the final. Bali won the final against Asian champion uzur zhuzhupbikov of Kyrgyzstan with a score of 7-4 and won Iran's fifth gold medal in the competition.
