= 2021 Asian Wrestling Championships =

- Host city: Almaty, Kazakhstan
- Dates: 13–18 April 2021
- Stadium: Baluan Sholak Sports Palace

Champions
- Freestyle: Iran
- Greco-Roman: Iran
- Women: Mongolia

The 2021 Asian Wrestling Championships took place from 13 April to 18 April in Almaty, Kazakhstan. It was held at the same venue as the 2021 Asian Wrestling Olympic Qualification Tournament. This event was the 34th edition of the Asian Wrestling Championships.

China did not enter the competition and Japan's women team withdrew before the championship due to close contact with a patient of COVID-19.

== Medal table ==
Rank	Nation	Gold	Silver	Bronze	Total
1	Kazakhstan	7	6	4	17
2	Iran	7	5	5	17
3	India	5	3	6	14
4	Japan	3	0	6	9
5	Kyrgyzstan	2	5	9	16
6	Mongolia	2	5	3	10
7	Uzbekistan	2	3	4	9
8	South Korea	2	1	10	13
9	Chinese Taipei	0	1	1	2
10	Tajikistan	0	1	0	1
11	Iraq	0	0	1	1
Totals (11 entries)		30	30	49	109

== Team ranking ==
Rank	Men's freestyle		Men's Greco-Roman		Women's freestyle	
Rank	Team	Points	Team	Points	Team	Points
1	Iran	179	Iran	194	Mongolia	173
2	India	151	Kazakhstan	156	India	168
3	Kazakhstan	149	Kyrgyzstan	153	Kazakhstan	161
4	Uzbekistan	123	Japan	133	South Korea	123
5	South Korea	120	South Korea	125	Kyrgyzstan	95
6	Japan	102	Uzbekistan	117	Uzbekistan	95
7	Mongolia	98	India	72	Chinese Taipei	44
8	Kyrgyzstan	95	Tajikistan	62	Singapore	9
9	Turkmenistan	46	Turkmenistan	26	Sri Lanka	8
10	Tajikistan	28	Iraq; Syria	20		

== Medal summary ==
=== Men's freestyle ===
Event	Gold	Silver	Bronze
57 kg	Ravi Kumar Dahiya; India	Alireza Sarlak; Iran	Nodirjon Safarov; Uzbekistan
57 kg	Ravi Kumar Dahiya; India	Alireza Sarlak; Iran	Yuto Takeshita; Japan
61 kg	Jahongirmirza Turobov; Uzbekistan	Adlan Askarov; Kazakhstan	Shoya Shimae; Japan
61 kg	Jahongirmirza Turobov; Uzbekistan	Adlan Askarov; Kazakhstan	Ikromzhon Khadzhimurodov; Kyrgyzstan
65 kg	Takuto Otoguro; Japan	Bajrang Punia; India	Jeong Yong-seok; South Korea
65 kg	Takuto Otoguro; Japan	Bajrang Punia; India	Morteza Ghiasi; Iran
70 kg	Syrbaz Talgat; Kazakhstan	Sirojiddin Khasanov; Uzbekistan	Islambek Orozbekov; Kyrgyzstan
70 kg	Syrbaz Talgat; Kazakhstan	Sirojiddin Khasanov; Uzbekistan	Karan Mor; India
74 kg	Nurkozha Kaipanov; Kazakhstan	Mostafa Hosseinkhani; Iran	Zandanbudyn Sumiyaabazar; Mongolia
74 kg	Nurkozha Kaipanov; Kazakhstan	Mostafa Hosseinkhani; Iran	Ikhtiyor Navruzov; Uzbekistan
79 kg	Gong Byung-min; South Korea	Ali Savadkouhi; Iran	Narsingh Yadav; India
79 kg	Gong Byung-min; South Korea	Ali Savadkouhi; Iran	Saiakbai Usupov; Kyrgyzstan
86 kg	Hassan Yazdani; Iran	Deepak Punia; India	Mustafa Abdul-Basit; Iraq
86 kg	Hassan Yazdani; Iran	Deepak Punia; India	Kim Gwan-uk; South Korea
92 kg	Kamran Ghasempour; Iran	Mönkhbaataryn Tsogtgerel; Mongolia	Gwon Hyeok-beom; South Korea
92 kg	Kamran Ghasempour; Iran	Mönkhbaataryn Tsogtgerel; Mongolia	Sanjeet Kundu; India
97 kg	Ali Shabani; Iran	Alisher Yergali; Kazakhstan	Takashi Ishiguro; Japan
97 kg	Ali Shabani; Iran	Alisher Yergali; Kazakhstan	Satyawart Kadian; India
125 kg	Oleg Boltin; Kazakhstan	Aiaal Lazarev; Kyrgyzstan	Amin Taheri; Iran
125 kg	Oleg Boltin; Kazakhstan	Aiaal Lazarev; Kyrgyzstan	Dorjkhandyn Khüderbulga; Mongolia

=== Men's Greco-Roman ===
Event	Gold	Silver	Bronze
55 kg	Yu Shiotani; Japan	Ilkhom Bakhromov; Uzbekistan	Nurmukhammet Abdullaev; Kyrgyzstan
55 kg	Yu Shiotani; Japan	Ilkhom Bakhromov; Uzbekistan	Pouya Dadmarz; Iran
60 kg	Aidos Sultangali; Kazakhstan	Mehdi Mohsennejad; Iran	Kim Seung-hak; South Korea
60 kg	Aidos Sultangali; Kazakhstan	Mehdi Mohsennejad; Iran	Ayata Suzuki; Japan
63 kg	Sultan Assetuly; Kazakhstan	Meisam Dalkhani; Iran	Huang Jui-chi; Chinese Taipei
63 kg	Sultan Assetuly; Kazakhstan	Meisam Dalkhani; Iran	Chung Han-jae; South Korea
67 kg	Tsuchika Shimoyamada; Japan	Almat Kebispayev; Kazakhstan	Hossein Asadi; Iran
67 kg	Tsuchika Shimoyamada; Japan	Almat Kebispayev; Kazakhstan	Amantur Ismailov; Kyrgyzstan
72 kg	Ryu Han-su; South Korea	Ruslan Tsarev; Kyrgyzstan	Taishi Horie; Japan
72 kg	Ryu Han-su; South Korea	Ruslan Tsarev; Kyrgyzstan	Amin Kavianinejad; Iran
77 kg	Pejman Poshtam; Iran	Daler Rezazade; Tajikistan	Demeu Zhadrayev; Kazakhstan
77 kg	Pejman Poshtam; Iran	Daler Rezazade; Tajikistan	Kairatbek Tugolbaev; Kyrgyzstan
82 kg	Jalgasbay Berdimuratov; Uzbekistan	Kalidin Asykeev; Kyrgyzstan	Satoki Mukai; Japan
82 kg	Jalgasbay Berdimuratov; Uzbekistan	Kalidin Asykeev; Kyrgyzstan	None awarded
87 kg	Nasser Alizadeh; Iran	Atabek Azisbekov; Kyrgyzstan	Rustam Assakalov; Uzbekistan
87 kg	Nasser Alizadeh; Iran	Atabek Azisbekov; Kyrgyzstan	Lee Seung-hwan; South Korea
97 kg	Mehdi Bali; Iran	Kim Seung-jun; South Korea	Yerulan Iskakov; Kazakhstan
97 kg	Mehdi Bali; Iran	Kim Seung-jun; South Korea	Beksultan Makhmudov; Kyrgyzstan
130 kg	Ali Akbar Yousefi; Iran	Alimkhan Syzdykov; Kazakhstan	Kim Min-joon; South Korea
130 kg	Ali Akbar Yousefi; Iran	Alimkhan Syzdykov; Kazakhstan	Murat Ramonov; Kyrgyzstan

=== Women's freestyle ===
Event	Gold	Silver	Bronze
50 kg	Valentina Islamova; Kazakhstan	Jasmina Immaeva; Uzbekistan	Seema Bisla; India
50 kg	Valentina Islamova; Kazakhstan	Jasmina Immaeva; Uzbekistan	None awarded
53 kg	Vinesh Phogat; India	Hsieh Meng-hsuan; Chinese Taipei	Assylzat Sagymbay; Kazakhstan
53 kg	Vinesh Phogat; India	Hsieh Meng-hsuan; Chinese Taipei	None awarded
55 kg	Mönkhboldyn Dölgöön; Mongolia	Aisha Ualishan; Kazakhstan	Kim Hyung-joo; South Korea
55 kg	Mönkhboldyn Dölgöön; Mongolia	Aisha Ualishan; Kazakhstan	None awarded
57 kg	Anshu Malik; India	Altantsetsegiin Battsetseg; Mongolia	Altynay Satylgan; Kazakhstan
57 kg	Anshu Malik; India	Altantsetsegiin Battsetseg; Mongolia	None awarded
59 kg	Sarita Mor; India	Baatarjavyn Shoovdor; Mongolia	Nuraida Anarkulova; Kyrgyzstan
59 kg	Sarita Mor; India	Baatarjavyn Shoovdor; Mongolia	None awarded
62 kg	Aisuluu Tynybekova; Kyrgyzstan	Khürelkhüügiin Bolortuyaa; Mongolia	Rushana Abdirasulova; Uzbekistan
62 kg	Aisuluu Tynybekova; Kyrgyzstan	Khürelkhüügiin Bolortuyaa; Mongolia	None awarded
65 kg	Zorigtyn Bolortungalag; Mongolia	Sakshi Malik; India	Lee Han-bit; South Korea
65 kg	Zorigtyn Bolortungalag; Mongolia	Sakshi Malik; India	None awarded
68 kg	Meerim Zhumanazarova; Kyrgyzstan	Enkhsaikhany Delgermaa; Mongolia	Jeong Eun-sun; South Korea
68 kg	Meerim Zhumanazarova; Kyrgyzstan	Enkhsaikhany Delgermaa; Mongolia	None awarded
72 kg	Divya Kakran; India	Zhamila Bakbergenova; Kazakhstan	Enkhbayaryn Tsevegmid; Mongolia
72 kg	Divya Kakran; India	Zhamila Bakbergenova; Kazakhstan	None awarded
76 kg	Elmira Syzdykova; Kazakhstan	Aiperi Medet Kyzy; Kyrgyzstan	Pooja Sihag; India
76 kg	Elmira Syzdykova; Kazakhstan	Aiperi Medet Kyzy; Kyrgyzstan	None awarded

== Participating nations ==
263 competitors from 20 nations competed.

- Bahrain (1)
- Chinese Taipei (4)
- India (29)
- Iran (20)
- Iraq (11)
- Japan (20)
- Kazakhstan (30)
- Kuwait (4)
- Kyrgyzstan (25)
- Mongolia (21)
- Pakistan (2)
- Palestine (2)
- Qatar (2)
- Singapore (2)
- South Korea (30)
- Sri Lanka (3)
- Syria (4)
- Tajikistan (11)
- Turkmenistan (13)
- Uzbekistan (29)
