= Ölziit, Khentii =

Settlement in Khentii, Mongolia

Coordinates: 47°30′16″N 110°10′22″E

Ulziit (Mongolian: Өлзийт) is a former Ulziit sum center settlement in the eastern part of Kherlen sum (district) of Khentii Province in eastern Mongolia, 53 km from aimag capital Öndörkhaan and 297 km from national capital Ulaanbaatar. According to the National Census 2010 Ölziit population is 1,110. Settlement is populated with Uriankhai tribe.
