= Sun Yanan =

Chinese freestyle wrestler

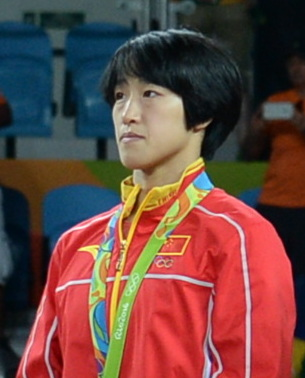
- Sun in 2016

Personal information
- Nationality: China
- Born: 15 September 1992 (age 33) Fengcheng, Liaoning, China
- Height: 161 cm (5 ft 3 in)

Sport
- Sport: Sport wrestling
- Event: Freestyle
Medal record
Women's freestyle wrestling
Representing China
Summer Olympics
Silver medal – second place	2020 Tokyo	50 kg
Bronze medal – third place	2016 Rio de Janeiro	48 kg
World Championships
Gold medal – first place	2013 Budapest	51 kg
Silver medal – second place	2012 Canada	51 kg
Bronze medal – third place	2018 Budapest	50 kg

Sun Yanan (Chinese: 孙亚楠; pinyin: Sūn Yànán; born 15 September 1992 in Fengcheng, Liaoning) is a Chinese freestyle wrestler. She won the silver medal in the women's 50 kg event at the 2020 Summer Olympics.

== Career ==
She competes in the 51 kg division and won the silver medal in the same division at the 2012 World Wrestling Championships.

She bettered her performance in the 2013 World Wrestling Championships where she won the gold medal after defeating Erdenechimegiin Sumiyaa of Mongolia.

Sun also won a gold medal at the 2016 Asian Wrestling Championships in Bangkok, Thailand.
