= Pooja Sihag =

Indian freestyle wrestler

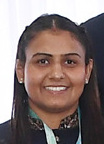
- Sihag in August 2022

Personal information
- Citizenship: Indian
- Born: 17 July 1997 (age 29) Sisai, Hisar
- Education: BA
- Occupation: Inspector in Rajasthan Police.
- Height: <171cm X m or X ft Y in (automatic conversion) plus optional year and reference -->
- Spouse: Naveen dahiya

Sport
- Country: India
- Sport: Amateur wrestling
- Weight class: 76 KG
- Event: Freestyle
Medal record
Women's freestyle wrestling
Representing India
Commonwealth Games
Bronze medal – third place	2022 Birmingham	76 kg
Asian Championships
Bronze medal – third place	2021 Almaty	76 kg
Asian U23 Championship
Silver medal – second place	2019 Ulaanbaatar	76 kg

Pooja Sihag (born 17 July 1997) is an Indian freestyle wrestler. She won one of the bronze medals in the women's 76 kg event at the 2022 Commonwealth Games held in Birmingham, England.

== Career ==
In 2017, she competed in the women's 75 kg event at the World Wrestling Championships held in Paris, France. In 2019, she won the silver medal in the women's 76 kg event at the Asian U23 Wrestling Championship held in Ulaanbaatar, Mongolia. In that same year, she also competed at the 2019 Asian Wrestling Championships held in Xi'an, China.

In April 2021, she competed at the Asian Olympic Qualification Tournament hoping to qualify for the 2020 Summer Olympics in Tokyo, Japan. She did not qualify for the Olympics at this tournament. In the same month, she won the bronze medal in her event at the 2021 Asian Wrestling Championships held in the same venue as the Asian Olympic Qualification Tournament. She also failed to qualify for the Olympics at the World Olympic Qualification Tournament held in Sofia, Bulgaria.

She won one of the bronze medals in the women's 76 kg event at the 2022 Commonwealth Games held in Birmingham, England.

== Achievements ==
Year	Tournament	Location	Result	Event
2021	Asian Championships	Almaty, Kazakhstan	3rd	Freestyle 76 kg
2022	Commonwealth Games	Birmingham, England	3rd	Freestyle 76 kg
