= Tsogt-Ochiryn Namuuntsetseg =

Mongolian freestyle wrestler

Personal information
- Native name: Цогт-Очирын Намуунцэцэг
- Nationality: Mongolia
- Born: March 31, 1996 (age 30) Khentii, Ölziit, Mongolia
- Height: 157 cm (5 ft 2 in)

Sport
- Country: Mongolia
- Sport: Amateur wrestling
- Weight class: 50 kg
- Event: Freestyle
- Club: Mega Stars, Ulaanbaatar
- Coached by: Tserendorj Bayarsaikhan

Achievements and titles
- Olympic finals: 5th(2020)
- Regional finals: (silver) (2022)
Medal record
Women's freestyle wrestling
Representing Mongolia
World Cup
Bronze medal – third place	2018 Takasaki	50 kg
Asian Championships
Silver medal – second place	2022 Ulaanbaatar	50 kg
Golden Grand Prix Ivan Yarygin
Gold medal – first place	2020 Krasnoyarsk	50 kg
Silver medal – second place	2023 Krasnoyarsk	50 kg
Bolat Turlykhanov Cup
Gold medal – first place	2022 Almaty	50 kg
Olympic Qualification Tournament
Silver medal – second place	2021 Almaty	50 kg
World U23 Championships
Bronze medal – third place	2018 Bucharest	50 kg
Asian U23 Championships
Gold medal – first place	2019 Ulaanbaatar	50 kg
Asian Junior Championships
Gold medal – first place	2016 Manila	48 kg

Tsogt-Ochiryn Namuuntsetseg (Mongolian: Цогт-Очирын Намуунцэцэг; born 31 March 1996) is a Mongolian freestyle wrestler.

== Sports career ==
She competed at the 2019 World Wrestling Championships, and 2021 Asian Wrestling Olympic Qualification Tournament. In 2020, she qualified for the 2020 Summer Olympics in Tokyo, Japan. She competed in the women's 50 kg event.

She won the silver medal in her event at the 2022 Asian Wrestling Championships held in Ulaanbaatar, Mongolia.
