= Remina Yoshimoto =

Japanese freestyle wrestler

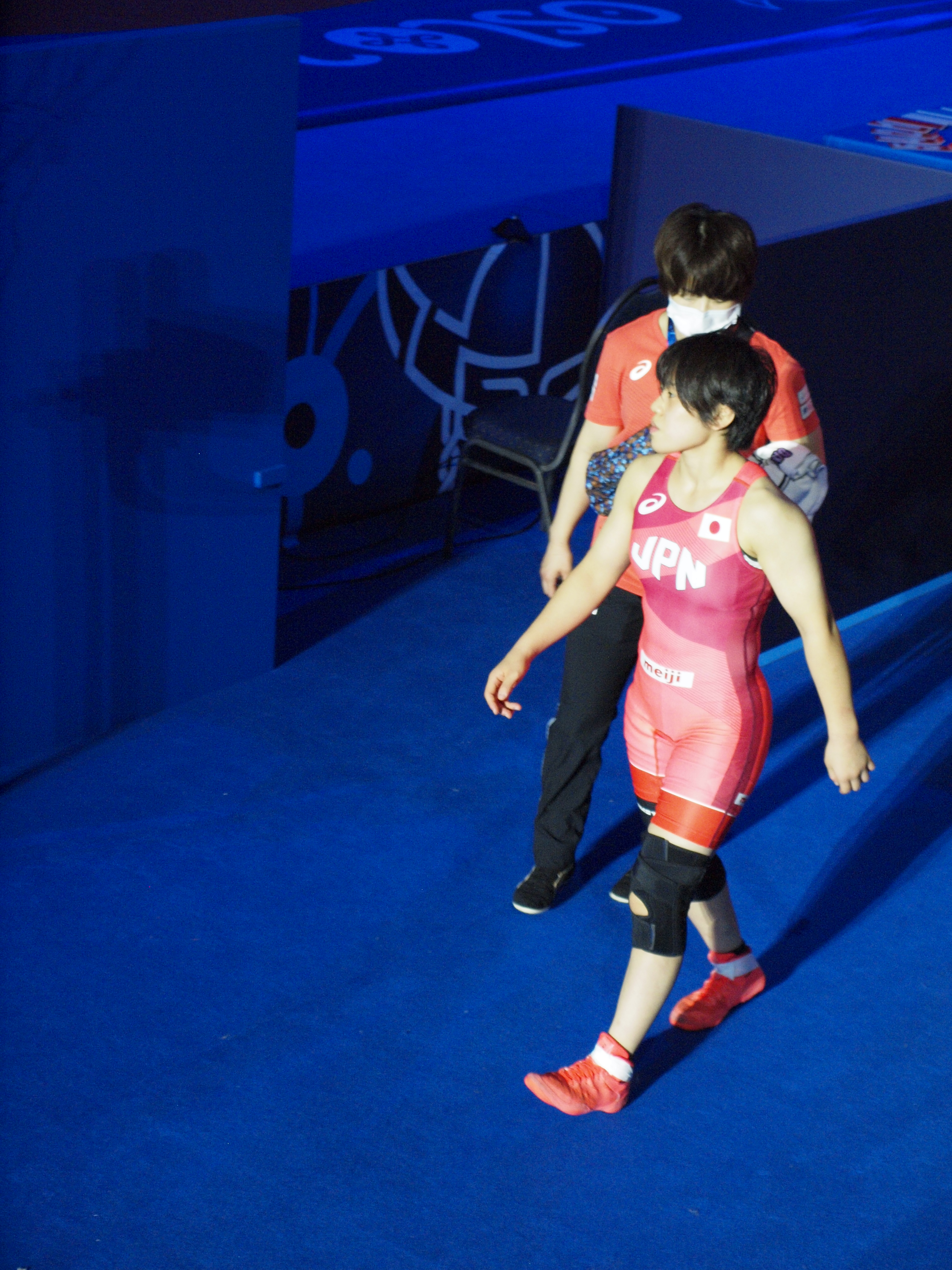
- Remina Yoshimoto at the 2021 World Wrestling Championships in Oslo, Norway

Personal information
- Nationality: Japan
- Born: 吉元玲美那; 1 August 2000 (age 25) Saitama, Japan
- Height: 151 cm (4 ft 11 in)

Sport
- Country: Japan
- Sport: Amateur wrestling
- Weight class: 50 kg
- Event: Freestyle
Medal record
Women's freestyle wrestling
Representing Japan
World Championships
Gold medal – first place	2021 Oslo	50 kg
Asian Championships
Gold medal – first place	2022 Ulaanbaatar	50 kg
Gold medal – first place	2023 Astana	50 kg
Gold medal – first place	2025 Amman	50 kg
Asian Games
Gold medal – first place	2022 Hangzhou	50 kg

Remina Yoshimoto is a Japanese freestyle wrestler. She won the gold medal in the women's 50 kg event at the 2021 World Wrestling Championships held in Oslo, Norway.

== Career ==
Remina Yoshimoto won the gold medal in her event at the 2022 Asian Wrestling Championships held in Ulaanbaatar, Mongolia.

A year later, Yoshimoto won the gold medal in her event at the 2023 Asian Wrestling Championships held in Astana, Kazakhstan. She won the gold medal in the women's 50 kg event at the 2022 Asian Games held in Hangzhou, China. She defeated Kim Son-hyang of North Korea in her gold medal match.

== Achievements ==
Year	Tournament	Location	Result	Event
2021	World Championships	Oslo, Norway	1st	Freestyle 50 kg
2022	Asian Championships	Ulaanbaatar, Mongolia	1st	Freestyle 50 kg
2023	Asian Championships	Astana, Kazakhstan	1st	Freestyle 50 kg
2023	Asian Games	Hangzhou, China	1st	Freestyle 50 kg
2025	Asian Championships	Amman, Jordan	1st	Freestyle 50 kg
