= Sanjeet Kundu =

Indian freestyle wrestler

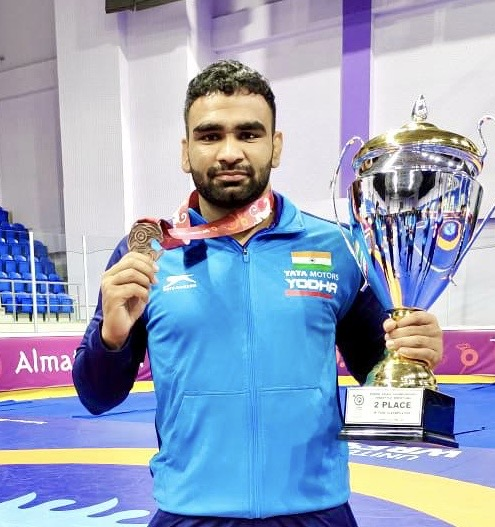

Personal information
- Native name: संजीत कुंडू
- National team: India
- Born: October 5, 1998 (age 28) Jhajjar, India
- Occupation: Chief Petty Officer
- Employer: Indian Navy
- Height: 178 cm (5 ft 10 in)

Sport
- Country: India
- Sport: Amateur wrestling
- Event: Freestyle
- Coached by: Veerendra Dalal; Rahul Berwal; Kuldeep Sehrawat

Achievements and titles
- National finals: Gold medal, 2023 National Wrestling Championship
- Personal best: Participated in 2022 World Wrestling Championships

Sanjeet Kundu (born 5 October 1998) is an Indian freestyle wrestler from Jhajjar, Haryana. He is known for winning a bronze medal at the 2021 Asian Wrestling Championships and gold medals at the National Wrestling Championships in 2023 and 2024. He also represented India at the 2022 World Wrestling Championships. Kundu serves as a Chief Petty Officer in the Indian Navy.

== Early life ==
Sanjeet Kundu was born on October 5, 1998, in Chandpur village, Jhajjar district, Haryana, India, into a Jaat family with an agricultural background. His father, Nafe Singh, is a farmer, and his mother, Saroj Devi, is a homemaker who also worked in the family's fields. Sanjeet is the youngest of five siblings, with four elder sisters, all of whom are married. His late grandfather was also a farmer, and his father is one of five brothers, further rooting the family in rural Haryana's farming community.

Sanjeet has credited his mother, Saroj Devi, for her significant role in supporting his wrestling career through her hard work and encouragement, despite the family's modest resources.

Growing up in Chandpur, Sanjeet was exposed to wrestling, a popular sport in Haryana, at a young age. At 12 years old, in 2009, he began training at the Virender Akhada in Chhara, Jhajjar, under the guidance of coaches Arya Virender Dalal and Rahul Berwal. This marked the start of his wrestling journey, where he developed the foundational skills that would lead to his later success. Sanjeet pursued his education alongside his athletic training, earning a Bachelor of Arts degree.

== Wrestling career ==
- At the 2015 Asian Cadet Wrestling Championships held in New Delhi, India, from 11 to 14 June, Kundu won a gold medal in the men's 76 kg freestyle event. He defeated Iran's Hamed Manafian Darband 10–4 in the final bout, securing his first international medal and contributing to India's haul of four medals on the second day of the championship.
- Pro Wrestling League (2018): Kundu participated in the Pro Wrestling League Season 3 as part of the Delhi Sultans team in the 86 kg category. During the league, he had one bout, with a record of 0 wins and 0 blocks.
- In 2019, he participated in the 2019 U23 World Wrestling Championships held in Budapest, Hungary, from October 28 to November 3.
- At the 2021 Asian Wrestling Championships held in Almaty, Kazakhstan, from 13 to 18 April, Kundu won a bronze medal in the men's 92 kg freestyle event. He secured an 11–8 victory over Uzbekistan's Rustam Shodiev in the bronze medal match, marking his first senior international medal. This achievement contributed to India's tally of 14 medals (5 gold, 3 silver, 6 bronze) at the event, where India finished third in the medal table.
- At the 2022 Dan Kolov & Nikola Petrov Tournament in Bulgaria, Kundu won a bronze medal in the men's freestyle 86 kg category contributing to India's total of 16 medals at the event.
- At the 2022 National Games of India held in Gujarat, he won a bronze medal in the men's freestyle wrestling even in the 86 kg weight category. His achievement was part of Haryana's wrestling contingent securing 14 medals in the sport during the 36th National Games.
- At the 2022 World Wrestling Championships, Kundu represented India in the men's 86 kg freestyle event. He competed in the men's 86 kg freestyle event, In his opening bout, he faced Tarzan Maisuradze of Georgia. Despite leading for most of the match, he conceded a takedown with 34 seconds remaining, resulting in a 4–4 loss based on criteria. losing a close match despite leading for most of the bout.
- In 2023, he won a gold medal at the National Wrestling Championship held in Goa from 29 October to 9 November, he dominated the final with a 10–0 score. It was celebrated widely in his hometown. Upon his return to Chandpur, he was honoured by DSO Lalita Malik, and his coach Veerendra Dalal was also recognized.
- At the 2024 National Wrestling Championships held in Jaipur, Rajasthan, from 2 to 5 February, Kundu won a gold medal in the men's 86 kg freestyle event, an Olympic weight category. He defeated Rahul Rathi in the final to claim the title, marking his second senior national championship gold.

Medal record
Competition	Gold	Silver	Bronze
Asian Cadet Wrestling Championships	1	–	–
Asian Wrestling Championships	–	–	1
Dan Kolov & Nikola Petrov Tournament	–	–	1
National Wrestling Championships (India)	2	–	–
National Games of India	–	–	1

== Career in the Indian Navy ==
Kundu joined the Indian Navy in 2016 under the sports quota as a freestyle wrestler. He holds the rank of Chief Petty Officer. Since 2019, he has trained with the Navy wrestling team in Sonipat, Haryana, under coach Kuldeep Sherawat, competing in the 86 kg category.
