= Lee Han-bit =

South Korean wrestler (born 1994)

Personal information
- Nationality: South Korean
- Born: 23 December 1994 (age 31) Seoul, South Korea
- Height: 166 cm (5 ft 5 in)

Sport
- Sport: Wrestling
- Event: Freestyle
Medal record
Women's freestyle wrestling
Representing South Korea
Asian Wrestling Championships
Bronze medal – third place	2018 Bishkek	65 kg
Bronze medal – third place	2021 Almaty	65 kg

Lee Han-bit (Korean: 이한빛; born 23 December 1994) is a South Korean freestyle wrestler.

== Career ==
Lee Han-bit competed at the 2024 Summer Olympics in Paris, finishing 15th in the women's freestyle 62 kg event. Lee also placed 19th at the 2018 World Wrestling Championships.

She is a two-time Asian Wrestling Championships bronze medalist, winning medals in the 65 kg category at both the 2018 and 2021 events. Lee finished ninth at the 2022 Asian Games.
