= Jasmine Mian =

Canadian freestyle wrestler and politician

Calgary City Councillor
- In office October 25, 2021 – October 29, 2025
- Preceded by: Jyoti Gondek
- Succeeded by: Andrew Yule
- Constituency: Ward 3

Personal details
- Born: December 31, 1989 (age 36) Guelph, Ontario, Canada
- Sports career
- Height: 155 cm (5 ft 1 in)
- Country: Canada
- Sport: Freestyle wrestling
- Event: 48 kg
- Club: Dinos Wrestling Club
- Coached by: Paul Ragusa
Medal record
Women's freestyle wrestling
Representing Canada
Commonwealth Games
Bronze medal – third place	2014 Glasgow	48 kg
- Updated on March 25, 2016

Jasmine Mian (born December 31, 1989 in Guelph, Ontario) is a politician and former Olympic wrestler from Canada. She won the bronze medal at the 48 kg event during the 2014 Commonwealth Games, and placed twelfth at the 2016 Summer Olympics.

Mian qualified to represent her country at the 2016 Summer Olympics, by winning the Canadian Trials in late 2015.

In July 2016, she was officially named to Canada's 2016 Olympic team.

Mian moved to Calgary in 2012. She was elected to Calgary City Council for Ward 3 in the 2021 Calgary municipal election, succeeding Jyoti Gondek, who was elected mayor. She did not seek re-election in 2025.
