= Sirojiddin Khasanov =

Uzbekistani freestyle wrestler

Personal information
- Nationality: Uzbekistan
- Born: 2 September 1995 (age 30) Uzbekistan
- Height: 170 cm (5 ft 7 in)

Sport
- Country: Uzbekistan
- Sport: Amateur wrestling
- Weight class: 70 kg
- Event: Freestyle
Medal record
Men's freestyle wrestling
Representing Uzbekistan
Asian Games
Bronze medal – third place	2018 Jakarta	65 kg
Asian Championships
Silver medal – second place	2021 Almaty	70 kg
Alany Tournament
Bronze medal – third place	2019 Vladikavkas	65 kg

Sirojiddin Khasanov (born 2 September 1995) is an Uzbekistani freestyle wrestler. He represented Uzbekistan at the 2018 Asian Games held in Indonesia and he won one of the bronze medals in the men's 65 kg event. He is also a silver medalist at the Asian Wrestling Championships.

== Career ==
In 2018, Khasanov competed in the 65 kg event at the World Wrestling Championships held in Budapest, Hungary without winning a medal.

In 2019, Khasanov competed in the men's 65 kg event at the Asian Wrestling Championships held in Xi'an, China but failed to win a medal.

== Achievements ==
Year	Tournament	Location	Result	Event
2018	Asian Games	Jakarta, Indonesia	3rd	Freestyle 65 kg
2021	Asian Championships	Almaty, Kazakhstan	2nd	Freestyle 70 kg
