= Xu Cheng =

Chinese freestyle wrestler

Personal information
- Nationality: Chinese
- Born: 5 May 1991 (age 35) China

Sport
- Sport: Sport wrestling
- Event: Freestyle
Medal record
Representing China
Women's Freestyle Wrestling
FILA Wrestling World Championships
Bronze medal – third place	2013 Budapest	48 kg

Xu Cheng (born 5 May 1991) is a Chinese freestyle wrestler. She won the bronze medal in the 48 kg division at the 2013 World Wrestling Championships.
