= Madison Parks =

Canadian freestyle wrestler

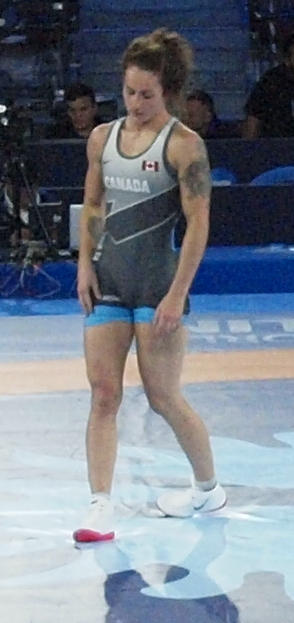
- Parks at the 2021 World Wrestling Championships in Oslo, Norway

Personal information
- Full name: Madison Bianca Parks
- Born: November 14, 1993 (age 32)

Sport
- Country: Canada
- Sport: Amateur wrestling
- Weight class: 50 kg
- Event: Freestyle
Medal record
Women's freestyle wrestling
Representing Canada
Commonwealth Games
Silver medal – second place	2022 Birmingham	50 kg
Pan American Championships
Silver medal – second place	2022 Acapulco	50 kg
Silver medal – second place	2025 Monterrey	50 kg

Madison Bianca Parks (born November 14, 1993) is a Canadian freestyle wrestler. She won the silver medal in the women's 50 kg event at the 2022 Commonwealth Games held in Birmingham, England. She also won the silver medal in the women's 50 kg event at the 2022 Pan American Wrestling Championships held in Acapulco, Mexico.

== Career ==
Parks competed in the women's 50 kg event at the 2020 Pan American Wrestling Championships held in Ottawa, Canada. In 2021, she lost her bronze medal match in the women's 50 kg event at the 2021 Pan American Wrestling Championships held in Guatemala City, Guatemala. A few months later, Parks was eliminated in her second match in the women's 50 kg event at the World Wrestling Championships held in Oslo, Norway.

In 2022, Parks won the gold medal in her event at the Matteo Pellicone Ranking Series 2022 held in Rome, Italy. She competed in the 50 kg event at the 2022 World Wrestling Championships held in Belgrade, Serbia.

In 2023, Parks lost her bronze medal match in her event at the Pan American Wrestling Championships held in Buenos Aires, Argentina.

== Achievements ==
Year	Tournament	Location	Result	Event
2022	Pan American Wrestling Championships	Acapulco, Mexico	2nd	Freestyle 50 kg
2022	Commonwealth Games	Birmingham, England	2nd	Freestyle 50 kg
2025	Pan American Wrestling Championships	Monterrey, Mexico	2nd	Freestyle 50 kg
