= Alina Vuc =

Romanian freestyle wrestler

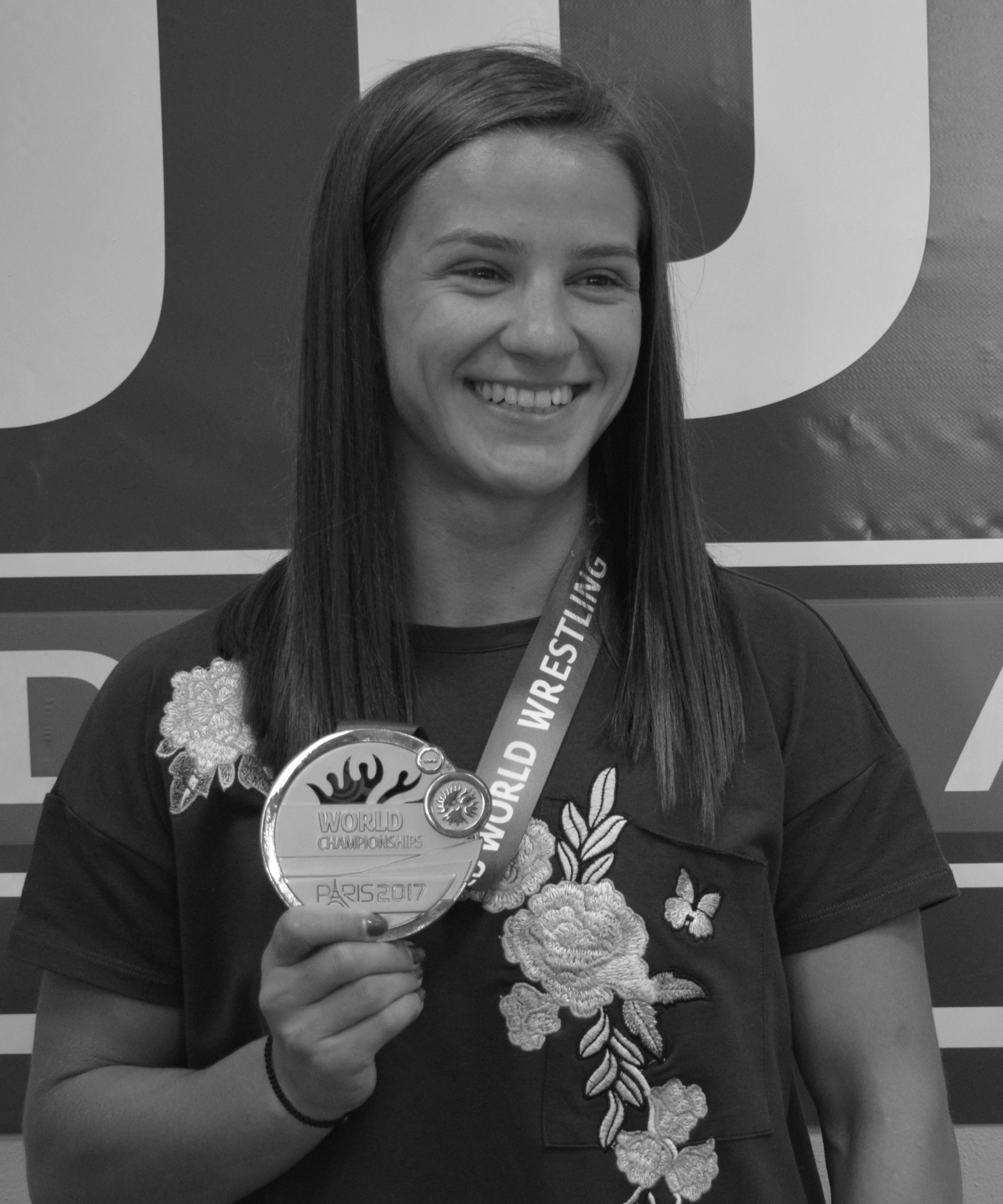
- Vuc with award in 2017

Personal information
- Full name: Emilia Alina Vuc
- Born: 4 October 1993 (age 32) Reșița, Romania

Sport
- Coached by: Mihai Stroia
Medal record
Women's freestyle wrestling
Representing Romania
World Championships
Silver medal – second place	2017 Paris	48 kg
Silver medal – second place	2019 Nur-Sultan	50 kg
European Championships
Silver medal – second place	2016 Riga	48 kg
Silver medal – second place	2018 Kaspiysk	50 kg
Bronze medal – third place	2017 Novi Sad	48 kg
Bronze medal – third place	2022 Budapest	50 kg
Yasar Dogu Tournament
Gold medal – first place	2022 Istanbul	50 kg
Silver medal – second place	2021 Istanbul	50 kg
Bronze medal – third place	2016 Istanbul	48 kg

Emilia Alina Vuc (born 4 October 1993) is a Romanian freestyle wrestler. She is a two-time silver medalist at the World Wrestling Championships and a four-time medalist at the European Wrestling Championships. She competed in the women's freestyle 48 kg event at the 2016 Summer Olympics, in which she was eliminated in the round of 16 by Vinesh Phogat. She also represented Romania in the women's 50 kg event at the 2020 Summer Olympics held in Tokyo, Japan.

== Career ==
In 2018, she won one of the bronze medals in the women's 50 kg event at the Klippan Lady Open in Klippan, Sweden. In 2021, she won the bronze medal in the 50 kg event at the Matteo Pellicone Ranking Series 2021 held in Rome, Italy. In October 2021, she lost her bronze medal match in the women's 50 kg event at the World Wrestling Championships in Oslo, Norway.

In 2022, she won the gold medal in the 50 kg event at the Yasar Dogu Tournament held in Istanbul, Turkey. In late March 2022, she won one of the bronze medals in the 50 kg event at the European Wrestling Championships held in Budapest, Hungary She lost her bronze medal match in the women's 50 kg event at the 2022 World Wrestling Championships held in Belgrade, Serbia.

== Achievements ==
Vuc has won major medals at both the World Wrestling Championships and the European Wrestling Championships. She won silver medals at the 2017 World Wrestling Championships in Paris in the 48 kg category and at the 2019 World Wrestling Championships in Nur-Sultan in the 50 kg category. At the European Championships, she won silver in 2016 and 2018 and bronze in 2017 and 2022. She also won the 50 kg event at the 2022 Yasar Dogu Tournament in Istanbul. In 2025, she finished fifth in the 50 kg event at the 2025 European Wrestling Championships in Bratislava, reaching the semifinals before losing to Evin Demirhan Yavuz and subsequently losing the bronze-medal bout to Natallia Varakina. In 2026, Vuc returned to the European Championships in Tirana, where she won a bronze medal in the 50 kg category after defeating Agata Marta Goluchowska-Walerczak in the bronze-medal match.

Year	Tournament	Location	Result	Event
2017	World Championships	Paris, France	2nd	Freestyle 48 kg
2019	World Championships	Nur-Sultan, Kazakhstan	2nd	Freestyle 50 kg
