= Valentina Islamova =

Kazakhstani freestyle wrestler

Valentina Islamova Валентина Исламова
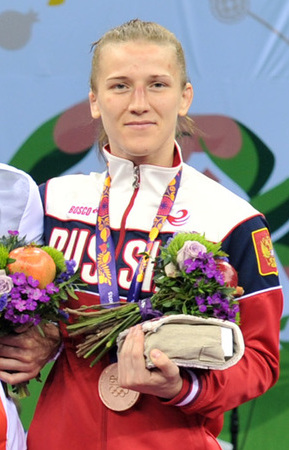
- Valentina Islamova (2015)

Personal information
- Nationality: Russian
- Born: 18 March 1992 (age 34) Novosibirsk Oblast, Russia
- Height: 159 cm (5 ft 3 in)

Sport
- Country: Kazakhstan
- Sport: Amateur wrestling
- Weight class: 50 kg
- Event: Freestyle
Medal record
Women's freestyle wrestling
Representing Russia
European Games
Bronze medal – third place	2015 Baku	48 kg
Golden Grand Prix Ivan Yarygin
Gold medal – first place	2015 Krasnoyarsk	48 kg
Women's freestyle wrestling
Representing Kazakhstan
World Championships
Bronze medal – third place	2019 Nur-Sultan	50 kg
Asian Championships
Gold medal – first place	2021 Almaty	50 kg
Bronze medal – third place	2019 Xi'an	50 kg
Bronze medal – third place	2020 New Delhi	50 kg

Valentina Islamova (born 18 March 1992) is an ethnic Russian freestyle wrestler representing Kazakhstan. She is a bronze medalist at the World Wrestling Championships and a three-time medalist, including the gold medal in 2021, at the Asian Wrestling Championships. She represented Kazakhstan at the 2020 Summer Olympics in Tokyo, Japan.

== Career ==
In 2015, at the Golden Grand Prix Ivan Yarygin held in Krasnoyarsk, Russia, she won the gold medal in the women's 48 kg event. In the same year, she represented Russia at the 2015 European Games held in Baku, Azerbaijan and she won one of the bronze medals in the 48 kg event.

In 2019, Islamova won one of the bronze medals in the 50 kg event at the 2019 Asian Wrestling Championships held in Xi'an, China. She also won one of the bronze medals in the 50 kg event at the World Wrestling Championships held in Nur-Sultan, Kazakhstan. In 2020, she repeated this result at the Asian Wrestling Championships held in New Delhi, India. In 2021, Islamova secured the gold medal in her event at the Asian Wrestling Championships held in Almaty, Kazakhstan. A few months later, she won one of the bronze medals in her event at the 2021 Poland Open held in Warsaw, Poland.

Islamova competed in the women's 50 kg event at the 2020 Summer Olympics held in Tokyo, Japan where she was eliminated in her first match by Lucía Yépez of Ecuador.

== Achievements ==
Year	Competition	Venue	Position	Event	Notes
Representing Russia
2015	European Games	Baku, Azerbaijan	3rd	Freestyle 48 kg	
Representing Kazakhstan
2019	World Championships	Nur-Sultan, Kazakhstan	3rd	Freestyle 50 kg	
2019	Asian Championships	Xi'an, China	3rd	Freestyle 50 kg	
2020	Asian Championships	New Delhi, India	3rd	Freestyle 50 kg	
2021	Asian Championships	Almaty, Kazakhstan	1st	Freestyle 50 kg	
