= Rebecca Muambo =

Cameroonian freestyle wrestler

Personal information
- Full name: Rebecca Ndolo Muambo
- Born: 16 July 1985 (age 41) Buea, Cameroon
- Height: 4 ft 11 in (150 cm)
- Weight: 48 kg (106 lb)

Sport
- Sport: Wrestling
- Event: Women's 48 kg
Medal record
Women's freestyle wrestling
Representing Cameroon
Commonwealth Games
Bronze medal – third place	2014 Glasgow	–48 kg
- Updated on 19 October 2014

Rebecca Ndolo Muambo (born 16 July 1985) is a Cameroonian freestyle wrestler. She competed in the women's freestyle 48 kg event at the 2014 Commonwealth Games where she won a bronze medal.

== Major results ==
Year	Tournament	Venue	Result	Event
2003	All-Africa Games	Abuja, Nigeria	3rd	Freestyle 48 kg
2007	All-Africa Games	Algiers, Algeria	3rd	Freestyle 48 kg
2007	World Championships	Baku, Azerbaijan	29th	Freestyle 48 kg
2009	African Championships	Casablanca, Morocco	7th	Freestyle 48 kg
2010	African Championships	Cairo, Egypt	3rd	Freestyle 48 kg
2011	African Championships	Dakar, Senegal	1st	Freestyle 48 kg
2011	World Championships	Istanbul, Turkey	38th	Freestyle 48 kg
2012	African Championships	Marrakesh, Morocco	1st	Freestyle 48 kg
2013	African Championships	N'Djamena, Chad	2nd	Freestyle 48 kg
2013	World Championships	Budapest, Hungary	21st	Freestyle 48 kg
2014	African Championships	Tunis, Tunisia	2nd	Freestyle 48 kg
2014	Commonwealth Games	Glasgow, United Kingdom	3rd	Freestyle 48 kg
2014	World Championships	Tashkent, Uzbekistan	20th	Freestyle 48 kg
2015	African Championships	Alexandria, Egypt	1st	Freestyle 48 kg
2015	World Championships	Las Vegas, United States	33rd	Freestyle 48 kg
2015	African Games	Brazzaville, Republic of the Congo	2nd	Freestyle 48 kg
2016	African Championships	Alexandria, Egypt	1st	Freestyle 48 kg
2016	Olympic Games	Rio de Janeiro, Brazil	16th	Freestyle 48 kg
