= Seema Bisla =

Indian wrestler (born 1993)

Personal information
- Born: 14 April 1993 (age 33) Rohtak district, Haryana, India
- Home town: Rohtak

Sport
- Country: India
- Sport: Amateur wrestling
- Weight class: 55 kg
- Event: Freestyle
Medal record
Women's freestyle wrestling
Representing India
Asian Championships
Bronze medal – third place	2021 Almaty	50 kg

Seema Bisla (born 14 April 1993) also known as Seema, is an Indian wrestler. She is a bronze medalist at the Asian Wrestling Championships. She represented India at the 2020 Summer Olympics in Tokyo, Japan. She lost her opening bout against Sarra Hamdi of Tunisia.

== Early and personal life ==
Seema is youngest of for sisters from Rohtak district of Haryana state of India. Her father and uncle, of Bisla clan of jats, earlier had career as wrestlers too. She was born in Gudhan village of Rohtak district.

== Junior games ==
She started winning streak at international level by winning bronze in 2009 Asian Cadet Championships in Pune followed by bronzes in 2012 and 2013 Asian Wrestling Championships.

== Senior games ==
=== Bronze in 55 kg in 2021 Asian Wrestling Championships ===
She trains at a akhara in Jharsa of Gurugram district, started in 67 kg but switched to 53 kg category in 2017. Won her her first senior national title in 53 kg category in 2017. At international level debuted at 2018 World Wrestling Championships but lost in first round of women's 55 kg event, lost again in second round of women's 50 kg event in 2019 World Wrestling Championships, but finally won her first international medal at 2021 Asian Wrestling Championships with a bronze. She lost her first match against Mariya Stadnik of Azerbaijan and she was then eliminated in her second match in the repechage by eventual bronze medalist Ekaterina Poleshchuk of Russia.

=== 55 kg in 2021 Olympics ===
In April 2021, she competed at the Asian Olympic Qualification Tournament held in Almaty, Kazakhstan hoping to qualify for the 2020 Summer Olympics in Tokyo, Japan. She did not qualify at this tournament but, a few days later, she won the bronze medal in the women's 50 kg event at the 2021 Asian Wrestling Championships held in the same venue. In May 2021, she qualified at the World Olympic Qualification Tournament held in Sofia, Bulgaria to compete at the 2020 Summer Olympics.

== Major results ==
Year	Tournament	Location	Result	Event
2021	Asian Championships	Almaty, Kazakhstan	3rd	Freestyle 50 kg
2021	Olympics	Japan	Lost	Freestyle 50 kg

== See also ==
- Akhara
- Pehlwani
- Wrestling in India
