= Kim Son-hyang =

North Korean freestyle wrestler

Personal information
- Native name: 김선향
- Born: 9 April 1997 (age 29)
- Height: 156 cm (5 ft 1 in)

Sport
- Country: North Korea
- Sport: Amateur wrestling
- Weight class: 50 kg
- Event: Freestyle
Medal record
Women's freestyle wrestling
Representing North Korea
World Wrestling Championships
Bronze medal – third place	2017 Paris	48 kg
Asian Games
Silver medal – second place	2022 Hangzhou	50 kg
Bronze medal – third place	2018 Jakarta	50 kg
Silver medal – second place	2026 Nagoya	50 kg
Asian Wrestling Championships
Silver medal – second place	2017 New Delhi	48 kg
Silver medal – second place	2026 Bishkek	50 kg
Summer Youth Olympics
Gold medal – first place	2014 Nanjing	46 kg

Kim Son-hyang (Korean: 김선향, born 9 April 1997) is a North Korean freestyle wrestler. She won one of the bronze medals in the 48 kg event at the 2017 World Wrestling Championships held in Paris, France.

In 2014, at the Summer Youth Olympics held in Nanjing, China, she won the gold medal in the girls' 46 kg event.

Kim won the silver medal in the women's 50 kg event at the 2022 Asian Games held in Hangzhou, China. In the final, she lost against Remina Yoshimoto of Japan.

Kim competed at the 2024 Asian Wrestling Olympic Qualification Tournament in Bishkek, Kyrgyzstan hoping to qualify for the 2024 Summer Olympics in Paris, France. She was eliminated in her first match and she did not qualify for the Olympics. She did not qualify for the Olympics at this event. A few weeks later, Kim competed at the 2024 World Wrestling Olympic Qualification Tournament held in Istanbul, Turkey and she earned a quota place for North Korea for the Olympics.

== Achievements ==
Year	Tournament	Location	Result	Event
2017	Asian Championships	New Delhi, India	2nd	Freestyle 48 kg
2017	World Championships	Paris, France	3rd	Freestyle 48 kg
2018	Asian Games	Jakarta, Indonesia	3rd	Freestyle 50 kg
2023	Asian Games	Hangzhou, China	2nd	Freestyle 50 kg
