= Elitsa Yankova =

Bulgarian freestyle wrestler

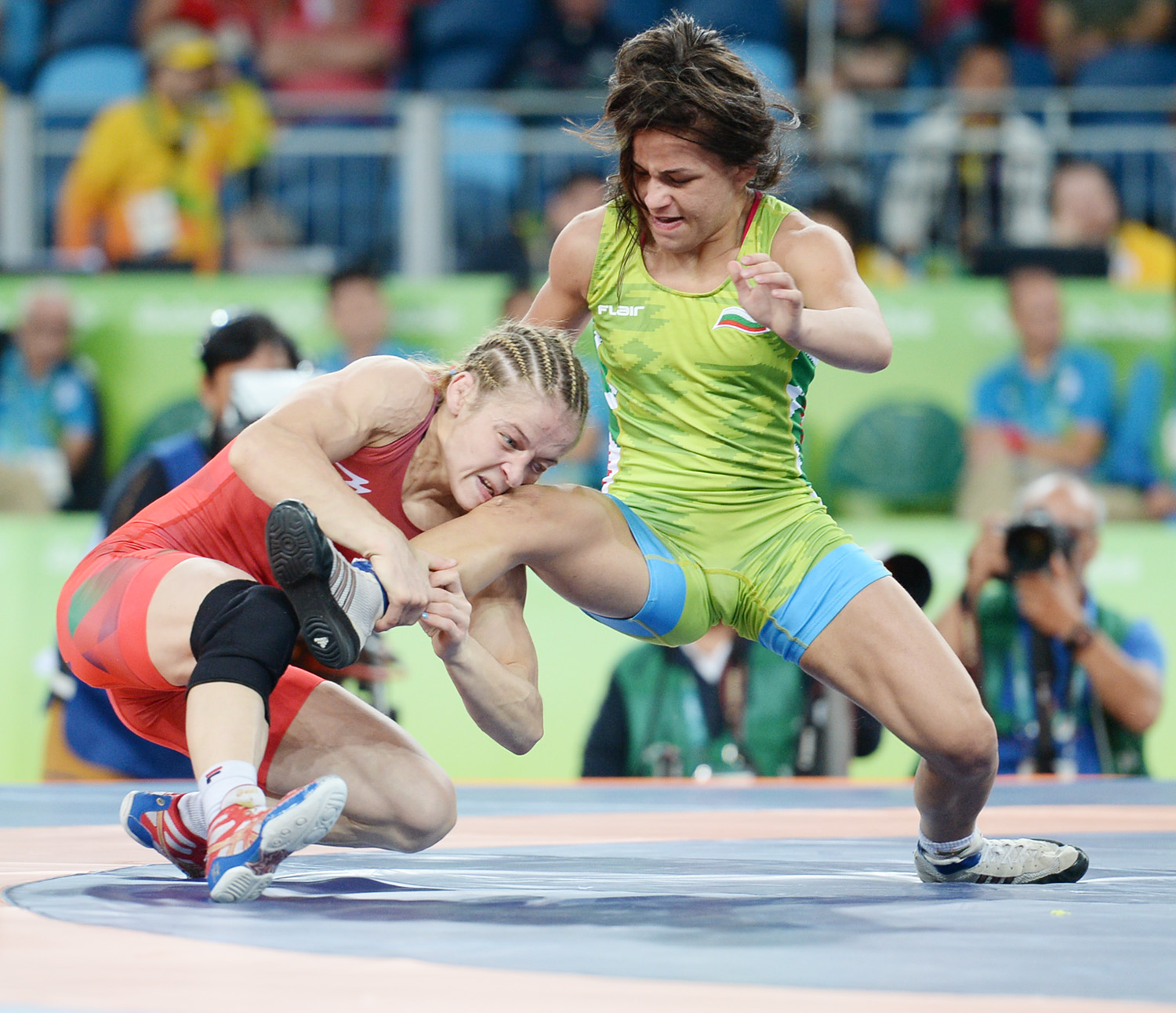
- Yankova (green) against Mariya Stadnik during the 2016 Summer Olympics

Personal information
- Born: 18 September 1994 (age 31) Varna, Bulgaria
- Height: 153 cm (5 ft 0 in)
Medal record
Women's Freestyle wrestling
Representing Bulgaria
Summer Olympics
Bronze medal – third place	2016 Rio de Janeiro	48 kg
European Championships
Bronze medal – third place	2016 Riga	48 kg
European Games
Silver medal – second place	2015 Baku	48 kg

Elitsa Atanasova Yankova (Bulgarian: Елица Атанасова Янкова, 18 September 1994) is a Bulgarian freestyle wrestler. She participated in the 48 kg competition in 2016 Summer Olympics and won a bronze medal. This became the first 2016 Olympics medal for Bulgaria.

As an adolescent, Yankova had ambitions for short-distance running in track and field, but later switched to freestyle wrestling. Her father, Atanas Yankov, is a former Greco-Roman wrestler.

In 2009, Yankova, though she failed to secure a spot at the European Championships, was noticed by coach Petar Kasabov, who convinced her to start training under him with the Levski sports club. In 2013, she became a junior world champion. She also holds a number of national titles. In 2015, Yankova damaged her spine, but recovered and returned to wrestling.

Yankova's hobby is folk dancing. She is a student at the South-West University.
