= Dangal (2016 film) =

2016 Indian film by Nitesh Tiwari

- Theatrical release poster
- Directed by: Nitesh Tiwari
- Written by: Nitesh Tiwari; Piyush Gupta; Shreyas Jain; Nikhil Mehrotra
- Story by: Curation: Nitesh Tiwari; Concept: Divya V. Rao
- Produced by: Aamir Khan; Kiran Rao; Siddharth Roy Kapur
- Starring: Aamir Khan; Sakshi Tanwar; Fatima Sana Shaikh; Zaira Wasim; Sanya Malhotra; Suhani Bhatnagar; Aparshakti Khurana
- Narrated by: Aparshakti Khurana
- Cinematography: Satyajit Pande (Setu)
- Edited by: Ballu Saluja
- Music by: Pritam
- Production companies: Aamir Khan Productions; Walt Disney Pictures India
- Distributed by: UTV Motion Pictures
- Release dates: 21 December 2016 (United States); 23 December 2016 (India)
- Running time: 161 minutes
- Country: India
- Language: Hindi (Note: Spoken with/in a strong Haryanvi accent)
- Budget: ₹70 crore
- Box office: ₹1,968–2,200 crore (Note: Bollywood Hungama reported that the collection was ₹1968 crore, Box Office India reported that the collection was ₹2,024 crore. While Box Office Mojo mentioned it around ₹2050 crore and The Hindustan Times mentioned that the film grossed more than ₹2,200 crore.)

Dangal (transl. 'wrestling bout') is a 2016 Indian Hindi-language biographical sports drama film directed by Nitesh Tiwari and produced by Aamir Khan, Kiran Rao, and Siddharth Roy Kapur under Aamir Khan Productions and The Walt Disney Company India. The film stars Khan as Mahavir Singh Phogat, a pehlwani amateur wrestler who trains his daughters Geeta Phogat and Babita Kumari to become India's first world-class female wrestlers. Fatima Sana Shaikh and Sanya Malhotra portray the adult versions of the two Phogat sisters, Zaira Wasim and Suhani Bhatnagar their younger versions, Sakshi Tanwar their mother, and Aparshakti Khurana adult version of their cousin, Ritvik Sahore his younger version, all of them except Shaikh, Tanwar and Sahore in their film debuts.

Development on the film began in early 2013 when Tiwari began writing the script. Khan had interviewed the Phogat sisters in 2014 on his talk show Satyamev Jayate, before Tiwari approached him with the script months later, after which Khan became the lead actor and producer. Set primarily in the Indian state of Haryana, principal photography commenced in September 2015 in the neighbouring Punjab. Satyajit Pande served as the cinematographer and Ballu Saluja as the editor. Pritam scored the film's background music and soundtrack, lyrics for which were written by Amitabh Bhattacharya. Kripa Shankar Patel Bishnoi, a coach with the Indian women's wrestling team, trained Khan and the cast for the wrestling sequences.

After a North American premiere on 21 December 2016, Dangal was released worldwide on 23 December to universal critical acclaim, with praise centered on the film's "honest" depiction of a real-life story and Khan's performance, including the emotional weight. The film was a commercial blockbuster, setting several records at the box office, including highest-grossing Hindi film and highest-grossing Indian film worldwide The film grossed ₹1,968−2,024 crore (US$340 million), worldwide by various different estimates, including $216.2 million in China alone.

Dangal screened at the Beijing International Film Festival in April 2017 and second BRICS festival in June 2017. At the 62nd Filmfare Awards, it won four awards: Best Film, Best Director, Best Actor (Khan) and Best Action (Shyam). At the 64th National Film Awards, Wasim won Best Supporting Actress for her portrayal of Geeta's younger self. Overseas, Dangal won the inaugural Best Asian Film award at Australia's 7th AACTA Awards, 2017's Best Foreign Film and Top Foreign Actor (for Aamir Khan) from China's Douban Film Awards, and two Jackie Chan Action Movie Awards, and was nominated in the Asian Brilliant Stars category at the 68th Berlin International Film Festival.

== Plot ==
Mahavir Singh Phogat, a former amateur wrestler trained in the traditional Indian pehlwani style, is a national wrestling champion from Balali, Haryana. Pressured by his father, he abandons his wrestling career to pursue steady employment. Despite his disappointment at being unable to win a medal for India, he vows that his future son will achieve his goal. However, upon having four daughters, he initially resigns himself to the belief that his aspirations will remain unfulfilled.

One fateful day, Mahavir's perspective changes when his eldest daughters, Geeta and Babita, beat up boys who insult them. Recognizing their potential and exceptional strength, Mahavir begins training them rigorously in wrestling. As a part of the coaching, he subjects them to gruelling early-morning exercises, enforces short haircuts and dietary changes, and insists on discipline, often drawing criticism from the local community and his own family; his brother Rajpal and nephew Mahavir also reluctantly support him. They visit their friend's marriage without Mahavir's knowledge, but are exposed; in the aftermath, their friend explains to them how Mahavir cares for them. Initially resentful of their father's harshness, the sisters gradually come to appreciate his dedication and the opportunities he seeks to create for them. Using equipment such as mattresses instead of wrestling mats due to financial constraints, Mahavir teaches them freestyle wrestling, preparing them for competitive tournaments. Geeta emerges as a prodigious talent, winning both junior and senior state and national championships, and eventually enrolls at the National Sports Academy in Patiala to train for the 2010 Commonwealth Games.

At the academy, Geeta forms new friendships but begins to deviate from her father's training regimen under the influence of her coach, Pramod Kadam, whose methods differ significantly from Mahavir's. This divergence leads to a series of defeats at the international level. During a visit home, Geeta, in a moment of arrogance, challenges and defeats her exhausted father in a wrestling match. Babita reminds her sister of the importance of respecting Mahavir's guidance, prompting Geeta to reconcile with her father. Meanwhile, Babita wins the national championship and joins Geeta at the academy, supporting her emotionally and reinforcing the bond between the sisters.

As the Commonwealth Games approach, Pramod assigns Geeta to compete in the 51 kg weight class instead of her customary 55 kg division. Angered by this decision, Mahavir travels to Patiala with Omkar and resumes coaching the sisters in secret. The sports authorities, learning of Mahavir's interference from Pramod, issue a warning but allow the sisters to continue competing, while Mahavir is barred from the academy and the girls' movements are restricted. Undeterred, Mahavir continues to train Geeta remotely, reviewing tapes of her previous matches and providing guidance over the phone.

During the Games, Geeta competes in her 55 kg weight category. Despite Pramod's instructions, she follows Mahavir's tactical guidance, progressing the final match. Frustrated, Pramod has Mahavir locked up on the big day before the final match begins; in the gold medal bout, trailing 1-5 in the final session with only nine seconds remaining, Geeta recalls Mahavir's strategies and executes a decisive 5-point move in the closing three seconds, clinching a 5-6 victory and winning the match 2-1. She becomes the first Indian female wrestler to win a gold medal at the Commonwealth Games. Mahavir, finally out by virtue of luck, rejoices with his daughters, overshadowing Pramod's attempts to claim credit, and the sisters' triumph is widely celebrated in the media.

== Cast ==
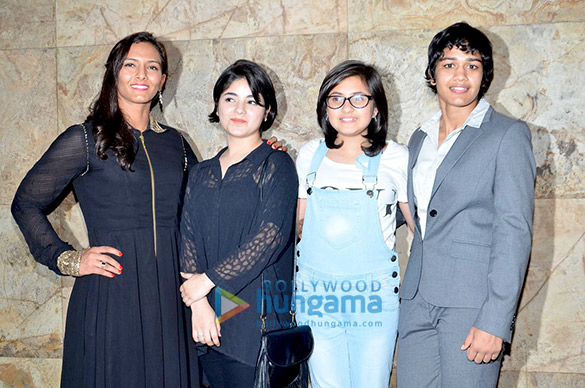
Geeta Phogat, Zaira Wasim, Suhani Bhatnagar and Babita Kumari at the film's special screening

- Aamir Khan as Mahavir Singh Phogat
- Sakshi Tanwar as Daya Shobha Kaur – Mahavir's wife
- Fatima Sana Shaikh as Geeta Phogat – Mahavir's eldest daughter
  - Zaira Wasim as Child Geeta
- Sanya Malhotra as Babita Kumari – Mahavir's second daughter
  - Suhani Bhatnagar as Child Babita
- Aparshakti Khurana as Omkar Singh Phogat (Also narrator) – Rajpal's son; Mahavir's nephew
  - Ritvik Sahore as Teenage Omkar
- Ishika Gagneja as Sunita
- Ananya Sharma as Child Ritu Phogat – Mahavir's third daughter
- Lakshita Goyal as Child Sangeeta Phogat – Mahavir's youngest daughter
- Girish Kulkarni as Pramod Kadam – Coach at the National Sports Academy
- Vivan Bhatena as Harkinder – Mahavir's colleague
- Shishir Sharma as Head of Department of the National Sports Academy
- Meenu Prajapati as Jasmeet – Geeta's friend at the National Sports Academy
- Badrul Islam as Shamim – Owner of meat shop
- Karmveer Choudhary as Maan Singh Phogat – Mahavir's father
- Anurag Arora as Rajpal Singh Phogat – Mahavir's brother; Omkar's father

== Production ==
=== Development ===
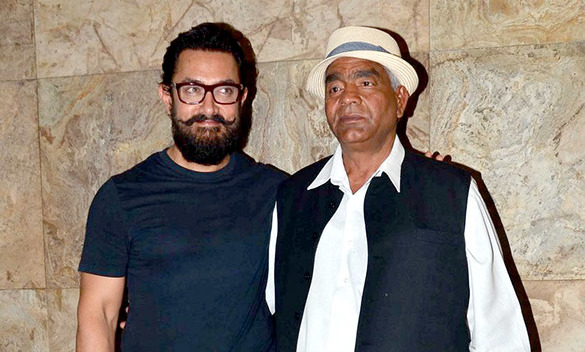
Aamir Khan and Mahavir Singh Phogat at the film's special screening

Divya V. Rao, a member of Disney India's creative team, read a newspaper article in 2012 about Mahavir Singh Phogat, who trained his daughters to become world champions. She thought this would make for a great film, and spoke about this to Siddharth Roy Kapur and other Disney personnel. Disney approached Nitesh Tiwari to write and direct the story. Tiwari met Phogat and his daughters, who instantly agreed to tell the story. Tiwari worked on the script for close to a year with Piyush Gupta, Shreyas Jain and Nikhil Mehrotra before going to Ronnie Screwvala, the CEO of UTV Motion Pictures, and Kapur with the final script, while suggesting that Aamir Khan play Phogat.

Months prior to being approached for with the script, Khan had invited the Phogat sisters onto his television talk show Satyamev Jayate, interviewing them on the first episode of season three in 2014. A few months after he interviewed them on Satyamev Jayate, he was approached by Tiwari. Kapur and Tiwari went to Khan with the story, and Khan loved it in its first narration. Khan had just finished Dhoom 3 and had begun shooting for PK. He wanted to do the film after 5–10 years when he would turn 60 because the role demanded him to be 55 and he was still doing younger roles. But the story remained in his mind and a few months later, he called up Tiwari and asked him to narrate the script once again.

After the release of PK in 2014, Khan announced that he would play the role of a wrestler in his next film titled Dangal directed by Tiwari, a cinematic biography of the former wrestler Mahavir Singh Phogat. Khan, who was to produce the film himself with Disney, said to reporters, "Nitesh has written a wonderful story. The topic is very important, it's very dramatic. It highlights the discrimination that is meted out to the girl child in India. The best part is that he has done it in a very entertaining manner. The heart of the story is emotional, but it also has a lot of humor. Raju Hirani has this unique way to tell a story where he says something socially very relevant but he tells his story in a very entertaining manner. Similarly, Nitesh has written a very entertaining lovely script, the dialogues are very entertaining. Each time I listen to the dialogues, I laugh a lot. I cry as well as laugh."

In March 2015, Junior Indian women's wrestling team coach Kripa Shankar Patel Bishnoi was approached by Aamir Khan Productions to train Khan and the entire crew of Dangal. Bishnoi said about the film in a Hindustan Times interview, "Very few Indians encourage women for wrestling, especially because of the uniform. This film will change that perception too. People would hopefully want to see their daughters taking up wrestling as a sport."

Khan lost some weight and took Haryanvi lessons and dialect training for the film. He played two distinct roles in the film: the 60-year-old wrestler Mahavir Singh Phogat, and the 20-year-old version of Phogat. Khan reportedly gained 30 kg and weighed 98 kg to play the role of the older Phogat, and then lost the weight to play the younger role in Dangal. The film was produced on a budget of ₹70 crore (US$10.42 million).

=== Casting ===
In March 2015, Taapsee Pannu, Deeksha Seth and Akshara Haasan were being considered for the roles of Khan's on-screen daughters. In April, Shaikh and Malhotra were cast as the daughters, who hailed from the Jat community of Balali village of Bhiwani, Haryana. Geeta Phogat had participated in the London Olympics in 2012, while Babita had won the gold medal in the 2014 Commonwealth Games in Glasgow. In June 2015, Wasim and Bhatnagar were roped in as child actors for the film. Khurana was also cast in the film, making his debut after a career as a VJ. Mukesh Chhabra served as the casting director, with Vikram Singh being recruited to play the role of the villain. Khan's nephew Pablo, who is the son of Mansoor Khan, was the film's assistant director. Mallika Sherawat auditioned for a role. Mrunal thakur also auditioned however she opted out citing scheduling conflicts. In August 2015, Rajkumar Rao, who previously worked with Khan in Talaash, was approached for an important role. After auditioning 70 actresses for the role, Tanwar was brought on as Daya Kaur, the wife of Mahavir Singh Phogat. Ananya was chosen to play Sangita, the youngest daughter of Mahavir Phogat. In October 2015, Vivan Bhatena, who appeared in a key role in Talaash, was selected to play a supporting role in the film. In an interview in January 2017, Rao stated that if Khan had declined the role, the only other choices would have been Mohanlal and Kamal Haasan.

For the film's Tamil language dub, Khan initially approached Rajinikanth to voice his role. Despite Rajinikanth enjoying the film, they both eventually decided against it, as they found Rajinikanth's voice to be too recognizable to go along with Khan's appearance.

=== Filming ===
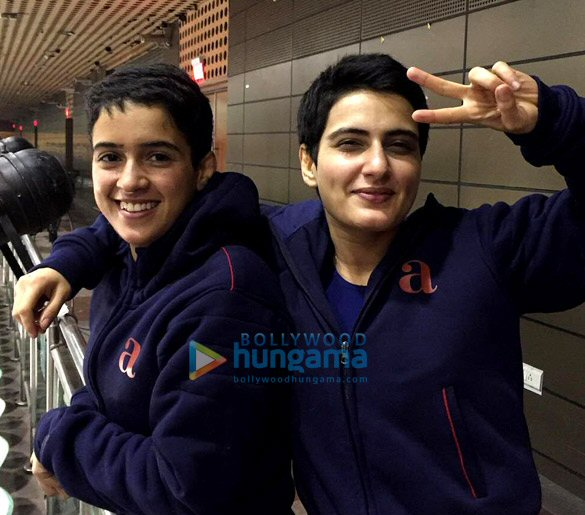
Fatima Sana Shaikh and Sanya Malhotra on the sets of Dangal

To prepare for the role, Shaikh and Malhotra watched several videos on wrestling to understand "how wrestlers move, walk, their body language". Both Malhotra and Sheikh went through five rounds of auditions, physical training and workshops with Tiwari and Khan. They were trained by coach and former wrestler Kripa Shankar Patel Bishnoi. From September 2015 to December 2015, Khan gained 9% fat, weighing around 98 kg for Dangal, and from January 2016 to April 2016, he regained the shape that he had opted for in Dhoom 3 and would hear the script for next future films, halting shooting of Dangal for said period.

The shooting schedule of Dangal began on 1 September 2015. The villages of Ludhiana were given a Haryanvi transformation. The shooting took place in the villages of Gujjarwal, Narangwal, Kila Raipur, Dango and Leel in Punjab and Haryana. The village of Dango, which is in the Pakhowal Tehsil in Ludhiana, is veteran actor Dharmendra's ancestral village.

The first scene was shot on 21 September 2015, in Ludhiana with the presence of Mahavir Singh Phogat and his daughters, Geeta and Babita. On 14 November 2015, while shooting in Ludhiana, Khan suffered minor injuries resulting in muscle spasms in his back. On 20 November 2015, Khan collapsed after sustaining a shoulder injury on the set. After his recovery, he resumed shooting in Pune on 9 December 2015.

The team filmed in and around stadiums at the Shree Shiv Chhatrapati Sports Complex in Pune. At the time, the complex hosted the 2015 Roll Ball World Cup, and athletes of the Netherlands national rollball team and Slovenia women's national roll ball team were recruited to play background athletes in the film. The team also shot some portions of the film in Symbiosis International University, Pune.

On 19 January 2016, Khan and the entire crew of the film shot in Delhi, at Talkatora Stadium, to film wrestling sequences. The crew then moved to Thyagaraj Stadium to shoot sequences of Commonwealth Games and National Games. The first schedule of shooting was also done in schools and in Dango village.

The second schedule of the film started on 16 June 2016, at the Akhada Leel near Toosa village, in Ludhiana district. It is one of the largest villages in Punjab. Khan said, "When I came to Ludhiana, I was very fat. At that time, we shot for the scenes where Mahavir has become old. 85 percent of the film is about his 'old' look only. Now we are shooting for the portion when Mahavir was young."

With the film being set in multiple decades, the cinematographer Satyajit Pande and colorist Ashirwad Hadkar experimented with a number of tests for skin tones and costumes during the pre-production stage. Natural light was majorly employed in the film. To portray the 1980s, the "sources [were kept] white-hot and the skin tones yellow-warm" for the day sequences, and "a consistent bulb warm tone was maintained" for the night sequences. With varying colour temperatures in the process of filming over an entire day starting early mornings until late evenings, visual effects plates were used and digital intermediate process employed.

== Music ==
The music for the film is composed by Pritam, with lyrics penned by Amitabh Bhattacharya in Hindi, Rajesh Malarvannan in Tamil and Rajshri Sudhakar in Telugu. Daler Mehndi sang the film's title track. The song "Dhaakad" was sung by rapper Raftaar and became popular receiving 12 million views, in three days. Khan rapped his own version of the song and included it in the album. The soundtrack album was released on 23 November 2016, in Hindi and 26 November 2016, in Tamil and Telugu, under the Zee Music Company label. The film's soundtrack album was released in Japan on April 13, 2018, by Rambling Records.

== Release ==
=== Original release ===
Dangal was released in the United States on 21 December 2016, and worldwide on 23 December 2016. The film was shown on an estimated 4,300 screens in India and 1,000 screens internationally. It was also released in Tamil and Telugu dubbed versions as Yuddham. It was declared tax-free in six Indian states – Uttar Pradesh, Uttarakhand, Haryana, Chhattisgarh, Delhi and Madhya Pradesh – to promote Beti Bachao, Beti Padhao, a Government of India's social campaign aiming to reduce the selective abortion of females, to protect girls, and to educate them. The Movie was marketed by a Mumbai Based company named Spice PR owned by Prabhat Choudhary.

=== China and other releases ===
Dangal's second phase of release was in the Chinese markets of East Asia, starting with Taiwan on 24 March 2017. Dangal was screened at the 7th Beijing International Film Festival, the first Indian film to be screened at the festival, in the non-competing panorama section in April 2017 as Shuaijiao Baba (Let's Wrestle, Father!), and received a standing ovation. The screening was attended by a number of Chinese celebrities, including actress Liu Yifei and actor Wu Gang. It released theatrically in China on 5 May 2017, on 9,000 screens, "the widest ever release for an Indian film in any territory", and opened to overwhelming response from critics and audiences alike. However, the film was trimmed by 20 minutes "to be in line with what the Chinese are used to." The film released in Hong Kong on 24 August 2017.

In June 2017, Khan announced plans to release the film in Japan and South America. Dangal released in Japan on 6 April 2018, and was the first film to be co-distributed by Disney with Japan's Gaga Corporation. Its Japanese language title is ダンガル きっと、つよくなる (Dangaru Kitto, Tsuyoku Naru), which has some similarity to the Japanese title of 3 Idiots (Kitto, Umaku Iku). A preview of Dangal was held on 25 January 2018, by the Japan Wrestling Association, whose chairman recommended the film as inspiration for the 2020 Tokyo Olympics. Another preview screening was held for the Japan Olympic wrestling team during training camp in February 2018, and was well received by the audience.

Dangal was released in South Korea on 25 April 2018. The film had its South Korean premier on 23 April 2018, which was attended by the South Korean female wrestling team for the 2018 Asian Games.

=== Home media ===
The film has been released on several Chinese online streaming platforms. As of November 2018, Dangal has been watched more than 400 million times across three Chinese streaming platforms: nearly 200 million on Tencent Video (140 million in Hindi, nearly 60 million in dubbed Mandarin), more than 144 million on IQiyi (120 million in Hindi, over 24 million in Mandarin), and over 80 million on Youku.

== Reception ==
=== Critical response ===
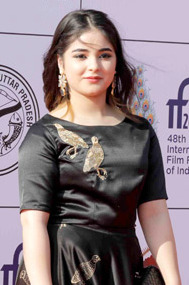
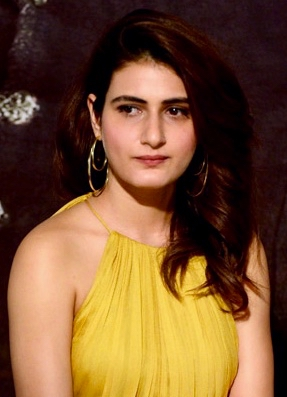
Zaira Wasim and Fatima Sana Shaikh were praised by many film critics for their portrayal of young and adult Geeta Phogat.

On the review aggregator website Rotten Tomatoes, 89% of 18 critics' reviews are positive, with an average rating of 7.8/10.

Critics often praised the portrayal of the subject matter in Dangal. Rachit Gupta of Filmfare magazine gave the film a full five-star rating calling it "perfect in every sense of the word." He added, "The film's direction and writing is so riveting that it coaxes it's the viewer to stand up and applaud. Great editing and filmmaking technique aside, Dangal features wrestling matches that are authentic and real." Meena Iyer of The Times of India called it "inspiring and entertaining" and awarded a four-and-a-half out of five star rating. She commended the writing of being for "tongue-in-cheek quality, peppered with humour and several poignant father-daughter emotions." Shubhra Gupta of The Indian Express gave a three out of five star rating and stated that the film worked on two parameters: that it is a "straight-forward film about a popular sport" and the "strong feminist statement about girls being the equal of boys, if not better, in an area they've never been seen, let alone accepted." Saibal Chatterjee of NDTV gave the film four out of five stars and calling it a "hugely entertaining sporting saga", pointed out that unlike other Bollywood films, Dangal does not "go for broke in terms of melodramatic flourish" and that it refrains from "demonstrative chest-thumping and flag-waving". He felt it blended "humour with intensity, and intimacy with spectacle, to perfection."

Ananya Bhattacharya of India Today gave a four out of five-star rating and wrote, "the fights, emotional turmoil, the father-daughter tiffs, take centre-stage in Dangal." She added, "Tiwari uses every single trope in the book of Bollywood sports films ... with a freshness and expertise seldom seen." Awarding the film a full five stars, Rohit Bhatnagar of Deccan Chronicle called it "an unmissable epic". Terming the narrative "engaging to the core", he drew comparisons to Chak De! India, while commending the acting performances and cinematography. Sukanya Verma of Rediff.com felt that Dangal was "one of those few films that discuss strategy and technique in a manner that's easy and entertaining to grasp". Calling it an "exhilarating creation" and praising the acting performances, she wrote, "the raw, rough, visceral choreography of the fights ... evokes sheer awe". Lisa Tsering of The Hollywood Reporter felt the film is driven by "emotional resonance, technical artistry and compelling performances" while adding that "it's so thrilling to watch. Not only do the family scenes ring true, but Tiwari approaches the wrestling sequences with intelligence and sensitivity."

There is not a trace of superstar-about Aamir Khan or a hint of vanity. For most of the film, he's an old, overweight man. Given the Bollywood obsession with looking youthful and flaunting six-packs, this itself is an act of courage. But Aamir doesn't just look the part. He also becomes it. He is by turns, ferocious and tender ... It's a masterful performance.

— Anupama Chopra of Film Companion

While commending the acting performances of all the lead actors, most critics focused praise on Khan's performance. Deepa Gauri of Khaleej Times wrote that Khan "puts in such an earnest and inspired performance that [it] will go down in the history of Indian cinema as one of the finest." Maitland McDonagh wrote for Film Journal International that "[a]ll four actresses playing Geeta and Babita are strikingly good, and Khan stands out as the deeply flawed Mahavir." Aniruddha Guha of MensXP.com thought that Khan captured the character's "highs and lows with flourish" and called it a "truly great performance", while adding that "the girls of 'Dangal' are a real find." Rohit Vats of Hindustan Times called it "best performance till date". Raja Sen of Rediff.com felt Khan's character was "both fascinating and flawed" and added that he is "a winner utterly sure of his beliefs who bends the world around him to his will. It is the performance of a lifetime". Baradwaj Rangan of The Hindu noted in his personal blog that Khan brought out the contradicting nature of the character "beautifully" and called it "one of his finest performances." Variety magazine's Owen Gleiberman felt that Khan, despite looking like a "jock version of Salman Rushdie ... with a tight-lipped mask, [he] finds a hundred ways to communicate emotion."

The film had its share of detractors who, while praising the narrative and performances, felt that the concept of feminism portrayed in the film was flawed. They pointed out that the wrestler-father, in pursuit of his goal of winning a medal for the country, trains his daughters against their will. Reviewing for The Hindu, Namrata Joshi wrote that the film despite aiming not to hide "chinks in the feminist armour", it does not explore its "dilemmas and complexities" and only "brush[es] things under the easy nationalistic carpet" by "justifying everything with "nation before the individual" logic." She complained of the "easy celebration of the supposed fall of patriarchy" depicted in the film and maintained that "men actually still remain very much in control." The view was echoed by Vartika Pande, in her "Feminist Reading" of the film for feminisminindia.com, who wrote, "Dangal ends up being a film about a patriarch at the helm who "empowers" women and obviously takes all the accolades." Al Jazeera's Azad Essa, while reviewing the film for Independent Online observed that "the elevation of women is still a manifestation of an unfulfilled male dream. It is the male coach who emerges as the true hero, and not the women." Strong responses on similar lines from a small section of the Chinese viewers met the film, where, following the release, a fresh debate on feminism began. A viewer complained that the film "reeks of patriarchy and male chauvinism".

Criticism was also directed at other areas of the film such as the characterisation of the coach at the academy. Uday Bhatia of Mint felt it was "incompetent and vindictive". Rajeev Masand felt it was "shoddy" and that the "twist in the film's final act ... came off as completely unconvincing". Tanul Thakur of TheWire.in also felt that the coach was "reduced to a caricature" and that "he simply exists because Aamir can become a hero." Thakur wrote that the second half of the film was "repetitive and bloated" and that it uses "clichés ... needlessly trying to inject drama".

In Hong Kong, Nicola Chan of South China Morning Post rated the film 5 out of 5 stars. In Japan, Yuri Wakabayashi of Eiga gave the film a positive review. Yoshika Yamada of IGN Japan called the film a "masterpiece" and rated it 9 out of 10. Zakzak rated the film 4 out of 5 stars. The film has received praise from a number of Japanese celebrities, including film critic Takeo Matsuzaki, television personality Tsutomu Sekine, video game developer Hideo Kojima, manga authors Keisuke Itagaki and Noboru Kawasaki, and athletes including Olympic wrestlers Saori Yoshida and Kazuhito Sakae, professional wrestlers Antonio Inoki and Tatsumi Fujinami, tennis player Shuzo Matsuoka, and weightlifter Hiromi Miyake. Upon release in Japan, it ranked first among early April 2018 releases in audience polls conducted by Filmarks (4.22 out of 5 stars) and PIA (93.3 out of 100).

=== Box office ===
Dangal grossed ₹716 crore after its initial run. It included ₹511 crore in India and ₹205 crore overseas. After it collected a nett of ₹345 crore over its third weekend from release, it beat the record held by PK for the highest grossing Indian film.

Dangal became highest grossing Indian film worldwide in July 2017, with an estimated gross of ₹2,000 crore by some sources, after its second phase of release in China and Taiwan. In July 2017, a spokesperson for Aamir Khan denied the reports that Dangal has crossed ₹ 2,000 crore worldwide. The worldwide distributor share of Dangal was ₹525 crore as of 1 June 2017. As of June 2017, the worldwide gross of Dangal stood nearly at US$307 million (₹2,000 crore) with some sources. Dangal emerged as 30th highest-grossing film of 2016 worldwide and the fifth highest-grossing non-English film of all time.

Dangal worldwide gross revenue breakdown
Territories	Gross revenue	Footfalls (est. ticket sales)
India	₹511.58 crore (US$76.13 million)	37,000,000
Overseas (2016)	₹205 crore (US$30.02 million)	2,880,832
United States and Canada	US$12.4 million (₹85 crore)	1,432,000
Arab Gulf States (GCC)	US$8.8 million (₹60.104 crore)	923,400
United Kingdom	£2.6 million – $4 million (₹27.23 crore)	348,134
Australia	$A 2.63 million – ₹14 crore (US$2.08 million)	190,580
Belgium, Luxembourg, Norway	US$97,152 – (₹12.318 crore)	12,318
Chinese markets (2017)	₹1,295.1 crore (US$202 million)	45,984,728
China	¥1,299,181,400 – US$192.22 million (₹1,231 crore)	44,897,623
Taiwan	NT$167 million – ₹41 crore (US$6.3 million)	730,000
Hong Kong	HK$27,139,998 – ₹23.1 crore (US$3.55 million)	357,105
Overseas (2018)	₹12 crore (US$1.75 million)	511,669
South Korea	₩906.42 million – US$850,000 (₹8 crore)	109,500
Turkey	₺1,556,553 – US$428,201 (₹4 crore)	364,146
Japan	¥50 million – ₹3 crore (US$438,663.83)	38,023
Overseas total	₹1,512 crore (US$234 million)	49,377,229
Worldwide total	₹2,024 crore (US$311 million)	86,402,829

Dangal is the first Indian film to gross $300 million worldwide, and one of the top 30 highest-grossing 2016 films. Dangal is also the highest-grossing sports film, and Disney's fourth highest-grossing film of 2017. Dangal is also the first Indian film to exceed $100 million and ₹1,000 crore overseas, grossing around ₹1,459 crore (US$224.04 million) in overseas markets by June 2017.

Dangal collected ₹29.8 crore on its opening day of release in India, and recorded as the second highest non-holiday opening after Dhoom 3. On 9 January 2017, Dangal became the highest grossing Indian film domestically, beating Aamir Khan's previous film PK. It eventually grossed ₹538.03 crore (US$80.07 million) from all languages in India. The film's footfalls at the domestic Indian box office was 37 million admissions.

Deadline Hollywood reported that Dangal would open in 331 North American screens, the hitherto highest for a Bollywood film, on 21 December 2016. Releasing in 279 theatres in the United States, it collected US$282,280 and US$42,816 from 24 theatres in Canada on the first day; an overall occupancy of 65 per cent was reported. It grossed US$12.4 million in North America becoming the highest grossing Indian film there, to be surpassed only months later by Baahubali 2: The Conclusion. Dangal was released in 95 screens across the Arab Gulf countries and was last reported to have collected ₹59.04 crore (US$8.79 million) from the region. In the United Kingdom, the film grossed £2.6 million in December 2016, and $4 million (₹27.23 crore) by January 2017. Upon theatrical release in Taiwan, Dangal earned over US$3 million and emerged as the number one film there, also becoming the highest grossing Indian film in the region. Its final gross in Taiwan was NT$167 million as of October 2017, or ₹41 crore (US$6.3 million).

=== China ===
In China, a nation where Indian films were rarely shown, it became the highest grossing Indian film. It was initially released in six Chinese cities and on Youku under the Chinese title 摔跤吧!爸爸 (pinyin: Shuāijiāo ba bàba, "Let's Wrestle, Father"). It grossed US$2.48 million on opening day, and grossed $14.5 million in just three days from theatrical release. The collections totalled to ₹300 crore at the end of day nine from release, taking the overall collections past ₹1,000 crore, becoming the first Indian film to reach the mark.

As of July 2017, Dangal has grossed about ¥1.3 billion ($202 million) in China. Its overseas gross in China more than doubled its domestic gross in India. In China, Dangal became one of the top 20 highest-grossing films of all time, the 8th highest-grossing foreign film, had the most consecutive days with a ¥10 million ($2 million) gross (surpassing the 30 days of Transformers: Age of Extinction) and $1 million gross (38 days), was the highest-grossing film in May 2017 (ahead of Pirates of the Caribbean: Dead Men Tell No Tales and Guardians of the Galaxy Vol. 2), and is the year's second highest-grossing foreign film (after The Fate of the Furious). In the month of May, Dangal drew 35 million viewers at the Chinese box office. In 52 days, the film had 44,897,623 admissions at the Chinese box office. Khan's earnings from Dangal were estimated to be ₹300 crore (US$46.07 million), one of the highest paydays for a non-Hollywood actor. By the end of its run in China, its final gross there was ¥1,299.18 million, equivalent to $216.2 million (₹1,400 crore).

==== Analysis of China box office ====
Dangal performed particularly well in China. This was attributed partly to Khan's popularity in China owing to the success of his previous films 3 Idiots (2009) and PK (2014) there. When 3 Idiots released in China, the country was only the 15th largest film market, partly due to China's widespread pirate DVD distribution at the time. However, it was the pirate market that introduced 3 Idiots to most Chinese audiences, becoming a cult hit in the country. It became China's 12th favourite film of all time, according to ratings on Chinese film review site Douban, with only one domestic Chinese film (Farewell My Concubine) ranked higher. Khan gained a large growing Chinese fanbase as a result. By 2013, China grew to become the world's second largest film market (after the United States), paving the way for Khan's Chinese box office success, with Dhoom 3 (2013), PK, and eventually Dangal. His TV show Satyamev Jayate also had a cult following in China, establishing Khan as someone associated with quality films and committed to social causes.

According to Chinese media, Dangal is one of the highest-rated films on Chinese film sites Douban and Maoyan, which helped the film generate strong word of mouth. The film's word of mouth was also helped by discussion generated on Chinese social media sites such as WeChat and Sina Weibo, including discussion surrounding Khan's previous work in film and television, as well as a number of prominent Chinese celebrities recommending Dangal to their fans, including stars such as Deng Chao, Wang Baoqiang, Yao Chen, Feng Xiaogang, Lu Han and Fan Bingbing. According to Maoyan, the film's audiences were 59% female and 41% male, and the majority were in the 20–34 age group. Dangal also surpassed the China gross of Captain America: Civil War (2016). According to The Beijinger: "In this atmosphere of poor Chinese films, Hollywood franchise fatigue and an ongoing ban on South Korean entertainment, Dangal has made the most of its opportunity to win over the Chinese film market." Its gross in China is notably higher than the gross of any non-English foreign film released in North America, where the highest is Crouching Tiger, Hidden Dragon (2000) with $128 million.

== Awards and nominations ==
Award	Date of ceremony	Category	Recipient(s) and nominee(s)	Result	Ref(s)
Filmfare Awards	14 January 2017	Best Film	Dangal	Won	
Filmfare Awards	14 January 2017	Best Director	Nitesh Tiwari	Won	
Filmfare Awards	14 January 2017	Best Actor	Aamir Khan	Won	
Filmfare Awards	14 January 2017	Best Action	Shyam Kaushal	Won	
Mirchi Music Awards	18 February 2017	Song of the Year	"Haanikaarak Bapu"	Nominated	
Mirchi Music Awards	18 February 2017	Album of the Year	Pritam, Amitabh Bhattacharya	Nominated	
Mirchi Music Awards	18 February 2017	Female Vocalist of the Year	Jonita Gandhi for "Gilheriyan"	Won	
Mirchi Music Awards	18 February 2017	Lyricist of the Year	Amitabh Bhattacharya for "Haanikaarak Bapu"	Nominated	
Mirchi Music Awards	18 February 2017	Upcoming Male Vocalist of the Year	Sarwar Khan & Sartaz Khan Barna for "Haanikaarak Bapu"	Won	
Mirchi Music Awards	18 February 2017	Best Song Producer (Programming & Arranging)	Aditya Pushkarna, Dj Phukan, Sunny M.R. & Anurag Saikia for "Dhaakad"	Nominated	
Mirchi Music Awards	18 February 2017	Best Song Engineer (Recording & Mixing)	Shadab Rayeen, Sunny M.R. & Ashwin Kulkarni for "Dhaakad"	Nominated	
Mirchi Music Awards	18 February 2017	Best Background Score	Pritam	Nominated	
Mirchi Music Awards	18 February 2017	Listeners' Choice Album of the Year	Dangal	Won	
News 18 Movie Awards	March 2017	Best Film	Dangal	Won	
News 18 Movie Awards	March 2017	Best Director	Nitesh Tiwari	Won	
News 18 Movie Awards	March 2017	Best Actor	Aamir Khan	Won	
News 18 Movie Awards	March 2017	Best Supporting Actress	Zaira Wasim	Won	
News 18 Movie Awards	March 2017	Best Lyricist	Amitabh Bhattacharya	Won	
News 18 Movie Awards	March 2017	Best Debut (Female)	Fatima Sana Shaikh	Won	
News 18 Movie Awards	March 2017	Best Debut (Female)	Sanya Malhotra	Nominated	
Zee Cine Awards	11 March 2017	Best Film (Viewer's Choice)	Dangal	Won	
National Film Awards	3 May 2017	Best Supporting Actress	Zaira Wasim	Won	
Indian Film Festival of Melbourne	12 August 2017	Telstra People's Choice Award	Dangal	Won	
Indian Film Festival of Melbourne	12 August 2017	Best Director	Nitesh Tiwari	Won	
National Child Awards	November 2017	Exceptional Achievement	Zaira Wasim (also for Secret Superstar)	Won	
Star Screen Awards	3 December 2017	Best Film	Dangal	Won	
Star Screen Awards	3 December 2017	Best Director	Nitesh Tiwari	Won	
Star Screen Awards	3 December 2017	Best Background Score	Pritam	Won	
Star Screen Awards	3 December 2017	Best Music Director	Pritam	Won	
Star Screen Awards	3 December 2017	Best Lyrics	Amitabh Bhattacharya	Won	
Star Screen Awards	3 December 2017	Best Editing	Ballu Saluja	Won	
Star Screen Awards	3 December 2017	Best Child Actor	Suhani Bhatnagar	Won	
Star Screen Awards	3 December 2017	Best Action Director	Sham Kaushal	Won	
Star Screen Awards	3 December 2017	Most Promising Newcomer (Male)	Aparshakti Khurrana	Won	
Star Screen Awards	3 December 2017	Best Writing	Nitesh Tiwari, Shreyas Jain	Won	
Star Screen Awards	3 December 2017	Star Plus Nayi Soch	Dangal	Won	
Star Screen Awards	3 December 2017	Most Promising Newcomer (Female)	Zaira Wasim (also for Secret Superstar)	Won	
Star Screen Awards	3 December 2017	Best Actor in a Comic Role	Aparshakti Khurrana	Nominated	
Star Screen Awards	3 December 2017	Best Actress – Popular Choice	Fatima Sana Shaikh	Nominated	
AACTA Awards	4 December 2017	Best Asian Film	Dangal	Won	
Douban Film Awards	28 December 2017	Best Foreign Film	Dangal	Won	
Douban Film Awards	28 December 2017	Top Foreign Actor	Aamir Khan	Won	
Douban Film Awards	28 December 2017	Most Talked About Film	Dangal	Nominated	
Douban Film Awards	28 December 2017	Top Movie Soundtrack	Dangal	Nominated	
Douban Film Awards	28 December 2017	Movie of the Month (May)	Dangal	Won	
Berlin International Film Festival	February 2018	Asian Brilliant Stars	Dangal	Nominated	
Jackie Chan Action Movie Awards	June 2018	Best Action Actress	Fatima Sana Shaikh	Won	
Jackie Chan Action Movie Awards	June 2018	Best New Action Performer	Sanya Malhotra	Won	

== Impact ==
Dangal, along with Japanese anime film Your Name (which Dangal overtook as the highest-grossing foreign film), began a new trend at the Chinese box office, with Chinese audiences slowly moving away from Hollywood blockbusters and taking more interest in films from other countries, such as Thailand's Bad Genius and Spain's Contratiempo. As of 5 November 2017, non-Hollywood imports account for 72 per cent ($519.7 million) of the year's foreign film box office revenue so far (US$723 million), with Dangal alone accounting for 27 per cent. An EntGroup survey in China found that the preference for Hollywood films declined from 61 per cent in 2016 down to 55 per cent in 2017, as Chinese audiences increasingly develop preferences for Chinese, Indian and Japanese films.

Dangal, along with Khan's next blockbuster Secret Superstar, drove up the buyout prices of Indian film imports for Chinese distributors. The success of Dangal and Secret Superstar contributed towards Salman Khan's Bajrangi Bhaijaan (2015) securing a wide release in China, along with Irrfan Khan's Hindi Medium (2017) getting a release in the country, followed by a number of other Indian films in 2018.

The film has also had an impact on Chinese cinema. The film's success has led to Chinese filmmakers becoming more confident in tackling social realist themes concerning Chinese society. The film's influence can be seen in the 2018 blockbuster Dying to Survive, for example.

Dangal has had a political impact, with the film being screened at the Indian parliament in a bid to spread the message of women empowerment. It has also had an effect on China–India relations, with Chinese leader and CCP general secretary Xi Jinping saying he enjoyed the film when he met Indian prime minister Narendra Modi. The film resonated with Chinese audiences, with Diangying Yishu (Film Art) magazine stating, "It is like the story of a Chinese village girl becoming an Olympic champion."

Several critics have noted that the Academy Award nominated American film King Richard (2021) starring Will Smith has a similar premise and plot to Dangal.

== Controversies ==
=== Political controversies ===
There was political controversy upon Dangal's release in India. In November 2015, Khan expressed the feelings that he and Kiran had about growing intolerance in India, which led to Khan facing intense backlash for the comments, including violent threats. As part of continued backlash against Khan's comments, there were calls for protests and boycotts against Dangal. In October 2016, the Vishva Hindu Parishad (VHP) called for protests against the film. Following its release in December 2016, #BoycottDangal was trending on Twitter, and BJP general secretary Kailash Vijayvargiya called for protests against the film.

There was also controversy over its release in Pakistan. In response to the Indian Motion Picture Producers Association (IMPPA) banning Pakistani film artists and technicians from working in Indian films, Pakistani theatre owners and exhibitors responded by temporarily putting a stop to screening Indian films. Due to Khan's popularity, however, Dangal was set to release in Pakistan, but the Central Board of Film Censors demanded that scenes featuring the Indian flag and Indian national anthem be omitted. Khan refused, and thus the film was not released in Pakistan, where it was predicted to gross up to ₹12 crore (US$1.79 million).

=== Award controversies ===
At the 64th National Film Awards in 2017, there was controversy over the National Film Award for Best Actor, which the committee awarded to Akshay Kumar for his performance in Rustom, instead of Aamir Khan's performance for Dangal. Committee member Priyadarshan, who has worked with Kumar on several films, gave the following explanation for awarding Kumar instead of Khan:

Why should we have given the Best Actor award to Aamir Khan when he has made it very clear that he doesn't attend awards functions? If he doesn't want to accept the honour, what is the point in honouring him? Nowadays, we have seen people returning their awards. We didn't want to take that risk.

Similarly, Dangal was not awarded at the 18th IIFA Awards, where Kumar was also not awarded. According to the IIFA Awards organisers:

So basically, in IIFA, forms are sent to various production houses. They fill those forms up and send it back to us. Those forms are then put out to the industry for voting and from there it becomes a nomination. So, Dangal has not sent their entry in. We would love Dangal to be a part of it. I think it's a movie that's broken all records. We love Aamir Khan and the two little girls. They did a great job. But unfortunately, they didn't send their entry in.

== See also ==
- Akhada: The Authorized Biography of Mahavir Singh Phogat published in January 2017.
- Phogat sisters – the sibling group upon which the film was based
- List of Bollywood films of 2016
- List of highest-grossing Indian films
