= Phogat =

Phogat is a name. People with the name include:

- Babita Phogat (born 1989), Indian professional wrestler and a politician
- Dipanshi Phogat, Indian wrestler
- Geeta Phogat (born 1988), Indian freestyle wrestler
- Mahavir Singh Phogat, Indian amateur wrestler and senior Olympics coach
- Phogat sisters, family of female wrestlers
- Priyanka Phogat, Indian freestyle wrestler
- Ritu Phogat, Indian mixed martial artist and wrestler
- Sonali Phogat (1979–2022), Indian politician
- Suruchi Phogat (born 2006), Indian sports shooter
- Rajdeep Phogat, Indian politician
- Vinesh Phogat (born 1994), Indian freestyle wrestler and politician

== See also ==
- Phogat, Charkhi Dadri, village in Charkhi Dadri, Haryana
- Akhada: The Authorized Biography of Mahavir Singh Phogat, biography of the Indian amateur wrestler Mahavir Singh Phogat
