= Dangon =

Dangon Dango
- Village
- Location in Punjab, India Dangon (India)
- Coordinates: 30.71°N 75.71°E
- Country: India
- State: Punjab
- District: Ludhiana district

Population
  - Total: 2,500

Languages
  - Official: Punjabi
- Time zone: UTC+5:30 (IST)
- PIN: 141108

Dangon is a village in the Raikot tehsil of Ludhiana district in Punjab State, India. Dango is a variation of the same name. It is ancestral village of Hindi cinema veteran actor Dharmendra, popularly known as He-Man of Bollywood.

== Notable personalities ==
- Indian movie superstar Dharmendra's ancestral origins lie in the village.
- A folk character of this village, Munshi Dango da, is an integral part of Punjabi folklore.

== In popular culture ==
Shooting for the Aamir Khan starrer movie Dangal took place in Dangon in September 2015 and also in Gujjarwal, Narangwal, Kila Raipur, and Leel in Punjab.
