= Dangu =

Dangu may refer to:

- Dangu, Eure, a commune in the Haute-Normandie region of France
- Dangu people, an ethnic group of northern Australia
- Dangu language, their language
- Dangu, a day of the week in the Pawukon calendar of Bali, Indonesia
- Dangu, a drum used in the music of Northeast China

== See also ==
- Dango (disambiguation)
