= Dango (disambiguation) =

Dango is a Japanese rice-based dumpling.

Dango may additionally refer to:

- Dango, Burkina Faso, a town in Boulgou Province, Burkina Faso
- Dango, drummer for American punk band Amber Pacific
- Odango, Japanese slang for bun (hairstyle)
- Dango, a derogatory term used by go players internationally referring to an inefficient, dumpling-like cluster of stones in a go game
- Dangō, Japanese word for bid rigging
- Dango, a font used within the 1998 Windows adventure game Grim Fandango
- Dango, a light Emirati dish of boiled chickpeas
- Dango, alternate name of Dangon, a village in India

== See also ==
- Dirty Dango, American professional wrestler
- Dangu (disambiguation)
- DAMGO, a synthetic opioid
