= Toosa =

Toosa Tusa
- Village
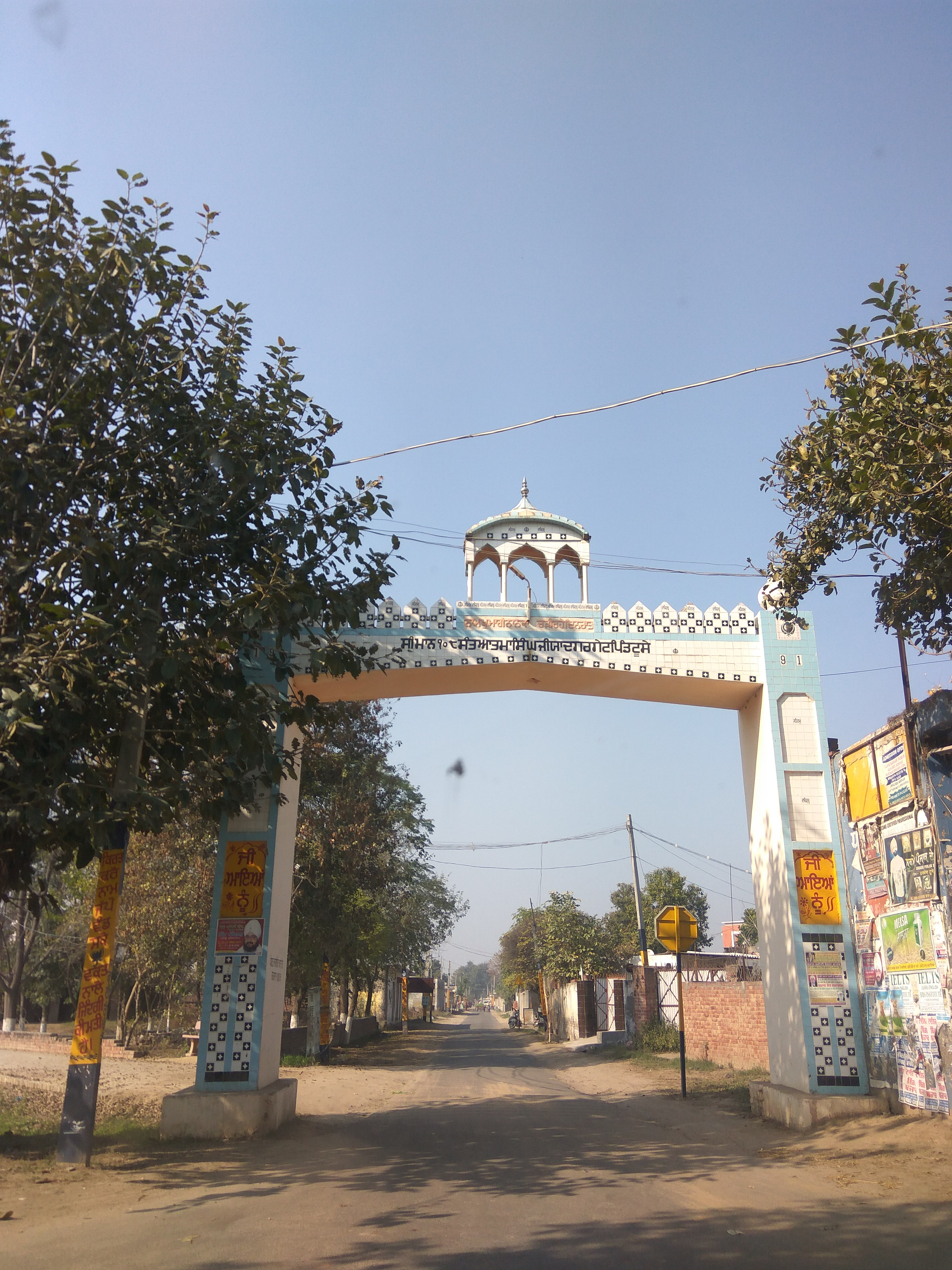

- Location in Punjab, India Toosa (India)
- Coordinates: 30°44′08.2″N 75°40′18.8″E
- Country: India
- State: Punjab
- District: Ludhiana
- Established: 1700

Government
  - Body: Panchayet

Area
  - Total: 2.4 km^{2} (0.93 sq mi)
- Elevation: 243.4 m (799 ft)

Languages
  - Official: Punjabi
- Time zone: UTC+5:30 (IST)
- PIN: 141105
- Vehicle registration: PB-10, PB-56, PB-91, PB-25
- Nearest city: Sudhar, Pakhowal, Halwara
- Lok Sabha constituency: Fatehgarh Sahib
- Vidhan Sabha constituency: Raikot

Toosa is a village in Punjab, India. It is in the Ludhiana district. On the Ludhiana Raikot road about 23 km south of Ludhiana, near Halwara, Shaheed Kartar Singh Sarabha International Airport.Village code of Toosa village is 033702.

== Village structure ==
The village is divided into 6 parts which developed based on its growth:

- Older Village inside redline (inside the Darwazas)
- Andarli Firni (1st Firni, inner ring)
- Bahrli Firni (2nd Firni, outer ring)
- Halwara Road Extension
- Rattowal Road Extension
- Leel Road Extension

Before 1950 all villagers lived within the redline area between two Darwazas (known as Vadda Darwaza and Shera Wala Darwaza / Lion Gate of Toosa). The houses are small traditional Punjabi houses.

After 1950 people began to move outside the redline. The 1st Firni was drawn in a ring shape outside the redline area for use as a common road. Houses were built in this area until circa 1980, at which time the village needed another Firni because of lack of space. Housing continued to be built in this outer ring area.

In the present, people are moving toward the outer roads of Toosa, which connect to nearby villages.

== Demographics ==
The population is above 3,115 and the area is 628 hectares according to the 2011 census.

=== Neighbouring villages ===
- Rattowal to the north 1.5 km
- Sarabha to the north-east 4.8 km
- Leel to the south-east 2.3 km
- Halwara in south-west 2.5 km

Village is connected to Gurusar Sudhar and Pakhowal with a wide, newly built road. Shaheed Kartar Singh Sarabha International Airport is about 2 from village Centre.

=== Toosa village has following facilities for public betterment ===
- Aanganwari (play school)
- Government Primary School Toosa
- Khalsa Senior Secondary School Toosa
- Government Dispensary for Humans
- Government Veterinary Dispensary
- Public Water Works
- Post Office
- Panchyaet Ghar
- Playground near Dera Sant Aatma Singh Ji
- Playground near Khalsa Senior Secondary School Toosa

=== Places of worship ===
Toosa village is multicultural village, peoples follow Sikhism & Sanatan Dharma. Village has 3 Gurdwaras, 2 Baba Bhuanas, 3 Mandirs, Baba Saheeds, Dera Sant Aatma Singh Ji.

=== Arts, social and culture ===
Some famous Singer & Lyricist & poet belongs to Toosa village. Hari Singh Jhajj famous as Jhajj Toosyan Wala is well known Punjabi Lyricist. Bai Hardev Toosa is famous Punjabi Singer. Recently Punjabi Singer Deep Amman featuring Shivendra Mahal Renu Mohali filmed his new song Rangla Chubara in Village Toosa.

=== Sports ===
Toosa has 2 playgrounds near Khalsa Senior Secondary School Toosa & near Dera Sant Aatma Singh Ji. Shriman 108 Sant Aatma Singh Ji Football Club Toosa organize annual Football Tournament and gymnastics games in last week of November or first week of December. Youth from village participate in Football, Kabaddi, Volleyball & Cricket games.
