= Wrestling at the 2026 Asian Games – Women's freestyle 50 kg =

Women's freestyle 50 kg at the 2026 Asian Games
- Venue: Inae Sports Center
- Date: 2 October 2026
- Competitors: 13 from 13 nations

Medalists
gold medal	Yui Susaki	Japan
silver medal	Kim Son-hyang	North Korea
bronze medal	Feng Ziqi	China
bronze medal	Zeinep Bayanova	Kazakhstan

The women's freestyle 50 kilograms wrestling competition at the 2026 Asian Games in Nagoya was held on 2 October 2026 at the Inae Sports Center.

This freestyle wrestling competition consists of a single-elimination tournament, with a repechage used to determine the winner of two bronze medals. The two finalists face off for gold and silver medals. Each wrestler who loses to one of the two finalists moves into the repechage, culminating in a pair of bronze medal matches featuring the semifinal losers each facing the remaining repechage opponent from their half of the bracket.

== Schedule ==
All times are Japan Standard Time (UTC+09:00)

Date	Time	Event
Friday, 2 October 2026	10:30	1/8 finals
Friday, 2 October 2026	10:30	1/4 finals
Friday, 2 October 2026	10:30	Semifinals
Friday, 2 October 2026	10:30	Repechages
Friday, 2 October 2026	18:00	Finals

== Results ==
Legend

- F — Won by fall

=== Main bracket ===
1/8 finals
Aliah Rose Gavalez (PHI)	0
Feng Ziqi (CHN)	10
Lin Yi-hui (TPE)	0
Đỗ Ngọc Linh (VIE)	10
Aktenge Keunimjaeva (UZB)	5^{F}
Nipuni Wasana (SRI)	0
Dipanshi Phogat (IND)	0
Yui Susaki (JPN)	11
Byambasürengiin Mönkhnar (MGL)	4
Zeinep Bayanova (KAZ)	8

1/4 finals
Kim Son-hyang (PRK)	6
Feng Ziqi (CHN)	1
Đỗ Ngọc Linh (VIE)	0
Aktenge Keunimjaeva (UZB)	5^{F}
Dit Samnang (CAM)	0
Yui Susaki (JPN)	10
Zeinep Bayanova (KAZ)	7
Cheon Mi-ran (KOR)	3

Semifinals
Kim Son-hyang (PRK)	11
Aktenge Keunimjaeva (UZB)	0
Yui Susaki (JPN)	4^{F}
Zeinep Bayanova (KAZ)	0

Final
Kim Son-hyang (PRK)	0
Yui Susaki (JPN)	10

=== Repechage ===
Repechage
Dipanshi Phogat (IND)	10
Dit Samnang (CAM)	0

Bronze medal matches
Feng Ziqi (CHN)	10
Aktenge Keunimjaeva (UZB)	0
Dipanshi Phogat (IND)	4
Zeinep Bayanova (KAZ)	11^{F}

== Final standing ==
Rank	Athlete
1st place, gold medalist(s)	Yui Susaki (JPN)
2nd place, silver medalist(s)	Kim Son-hyang (PRK)
3rd place, bronze medalist(s)	Feng Ziqi (CHN)
3rd place, bronze medalist(s)	Zeinep Bayanova (KAZ)
5	Aktenge Keunimjaeva (UZB)
5	Dipanshi Phogat (IND)
7	Đỗ Ngọc Linh (VIE)
8	Byambasürengiin Mönkhnar (MGL)
9	Cheon Mi-ran (KOR)
10	Nipuni Wasana (SRI)
11	Aliah Rose Gavalez (PHI)
12	Lin Yi-hui (TPE)
13	Dit Samnang (CAM)
