= Rithal =

Village in Haryana, India

Rithal is a village in Rohtak district of Haryana, India. It is located 22 km from Rohtak. Initially it was a part of Sonipat district, however for a long time it has been in the Rohtak District. This is one of the very few villages which has two panchayats (Rithal Phogat and Rithal Narwal). Villagers work in various fields such as agriculture, armed forces, information technology, banking, business and in various government departments.

== Gallery ==
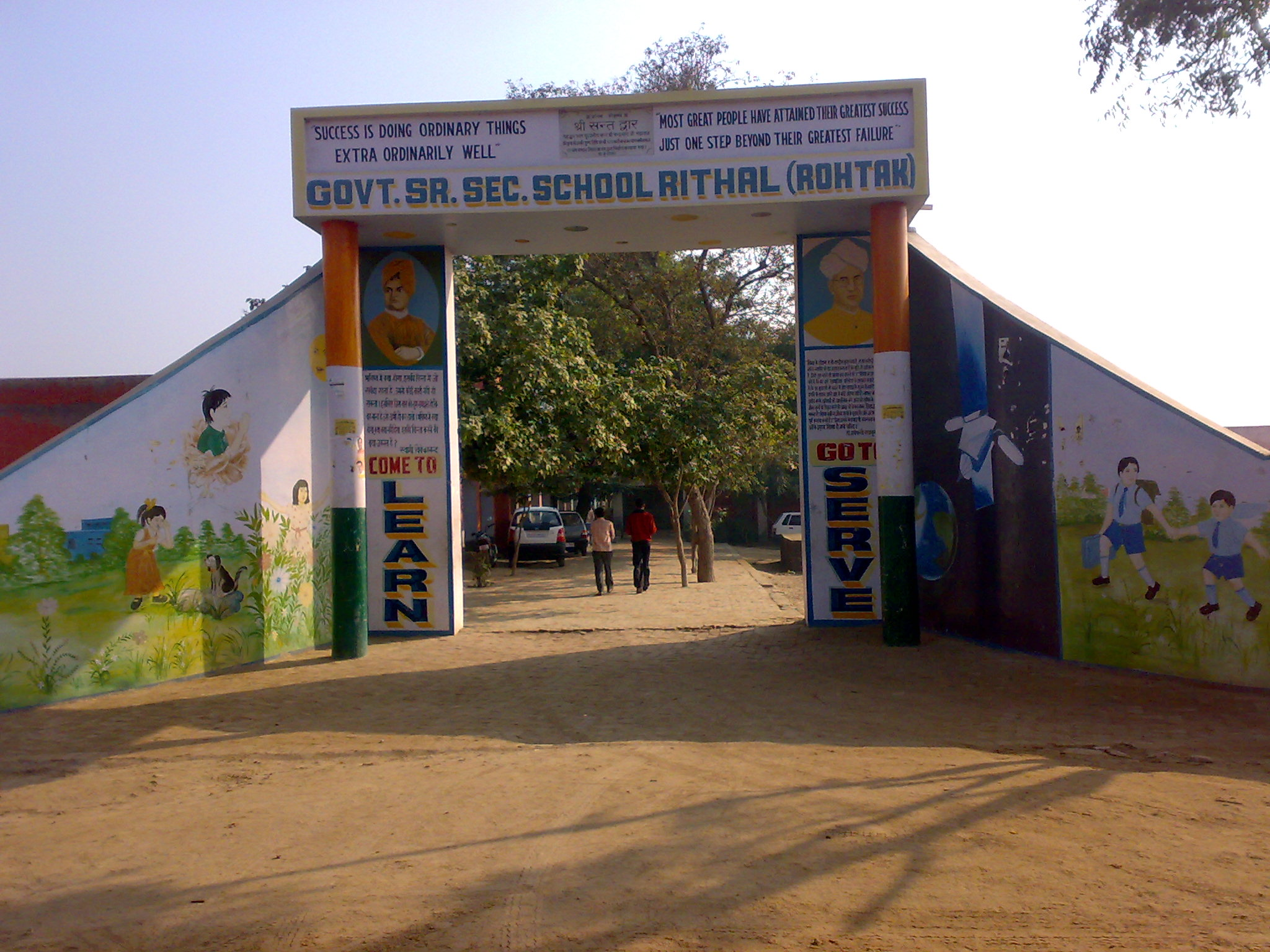
School of village Rithal.

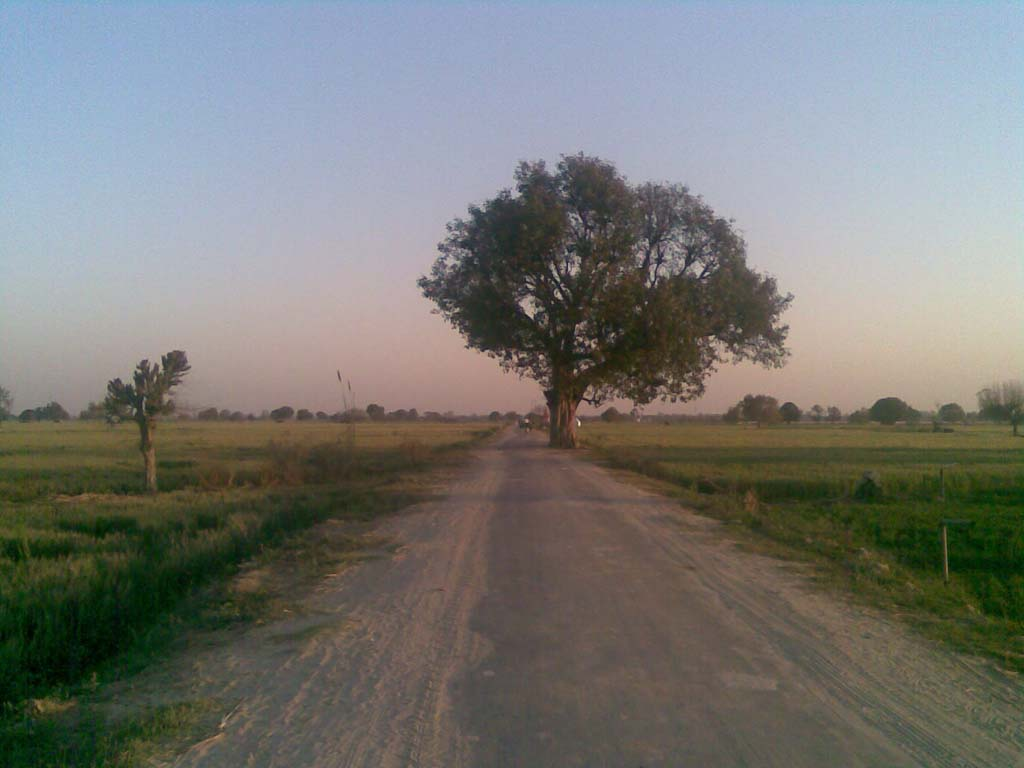
Very old Tree from Village Rithal

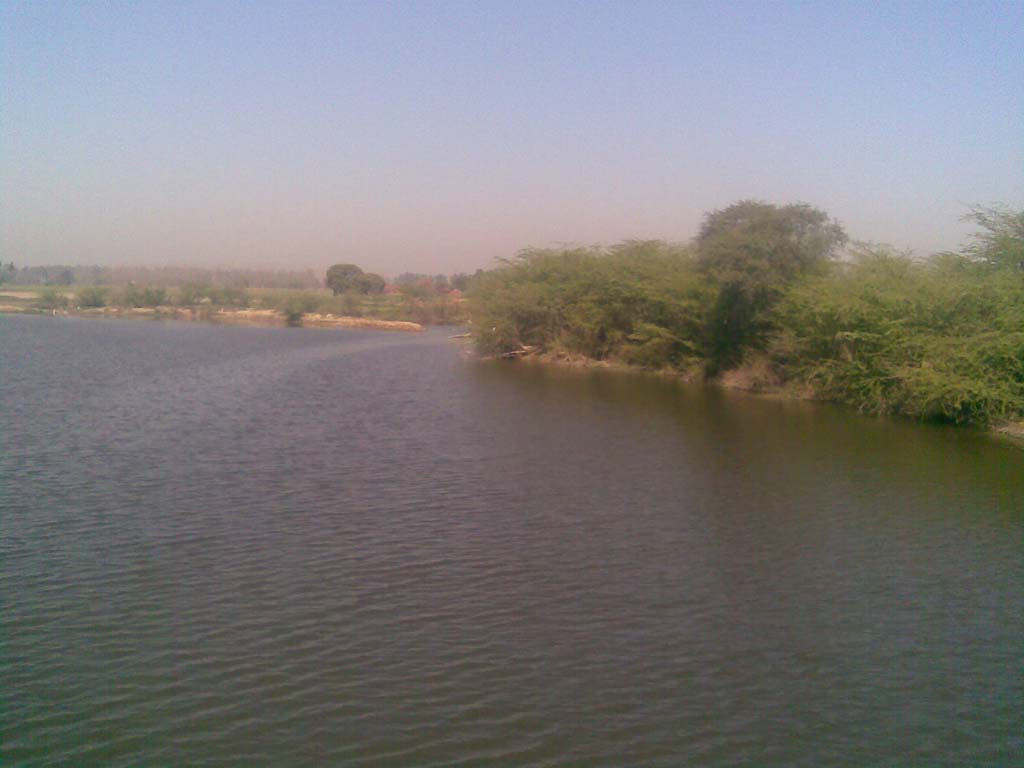
This is Pond of village of Rithal, in local language we call it "JOHAD" the name of this Pond is "DITHHYA".

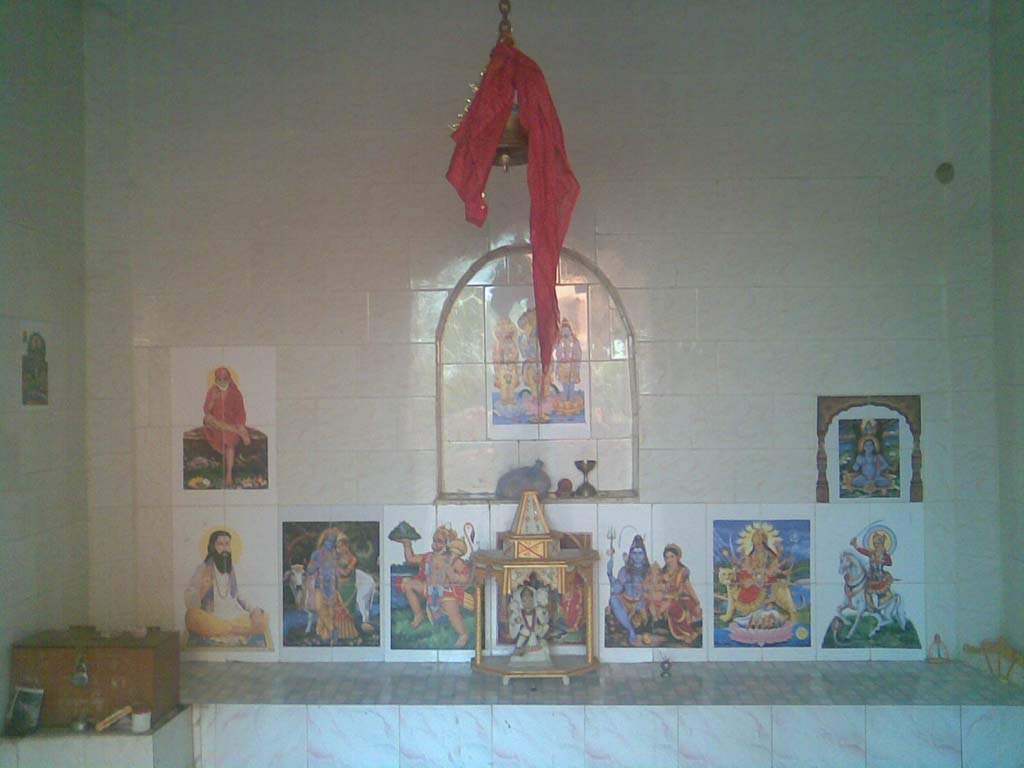
This photo is from temple "Ram Wala".

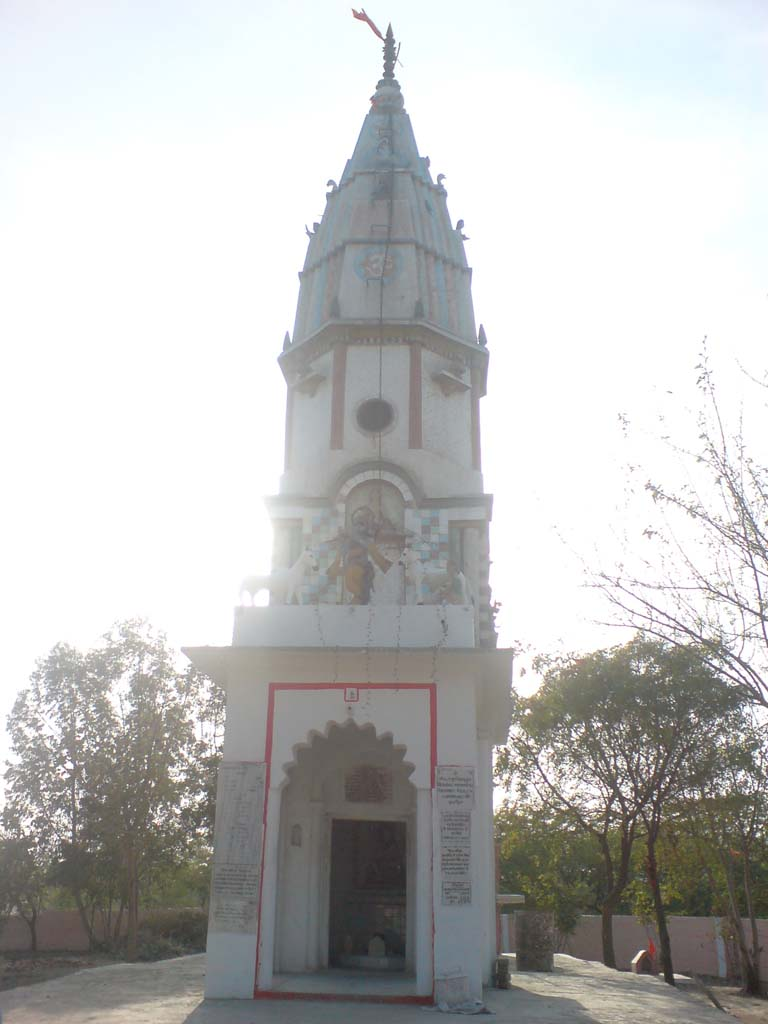
Shiv temple of Rithal Narwal

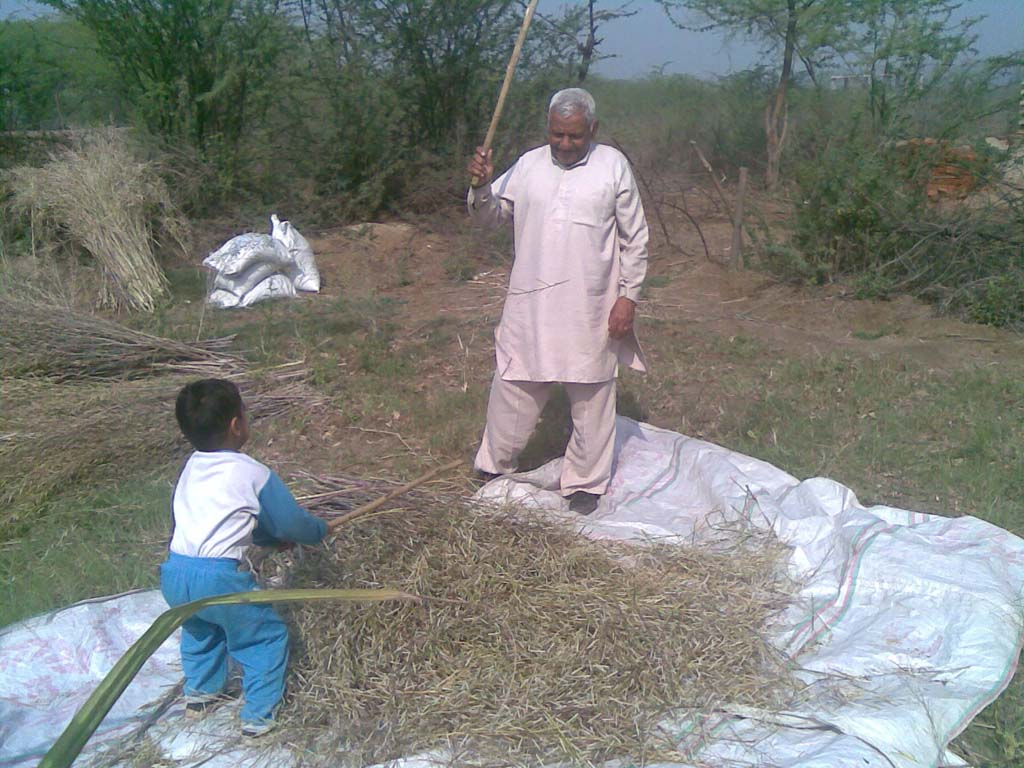
Hard work in fields

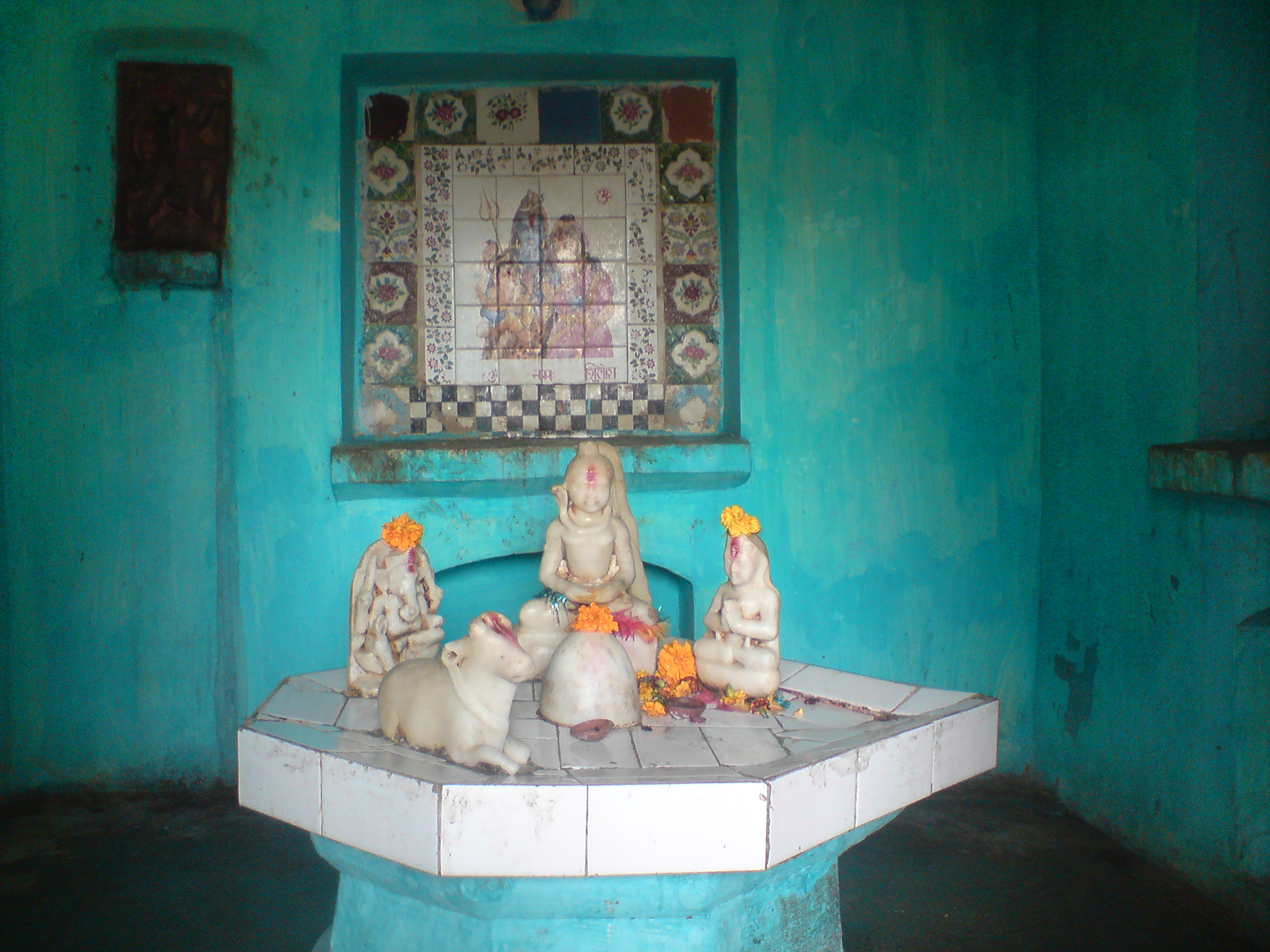
Shiv Temple of Rithal Phogat

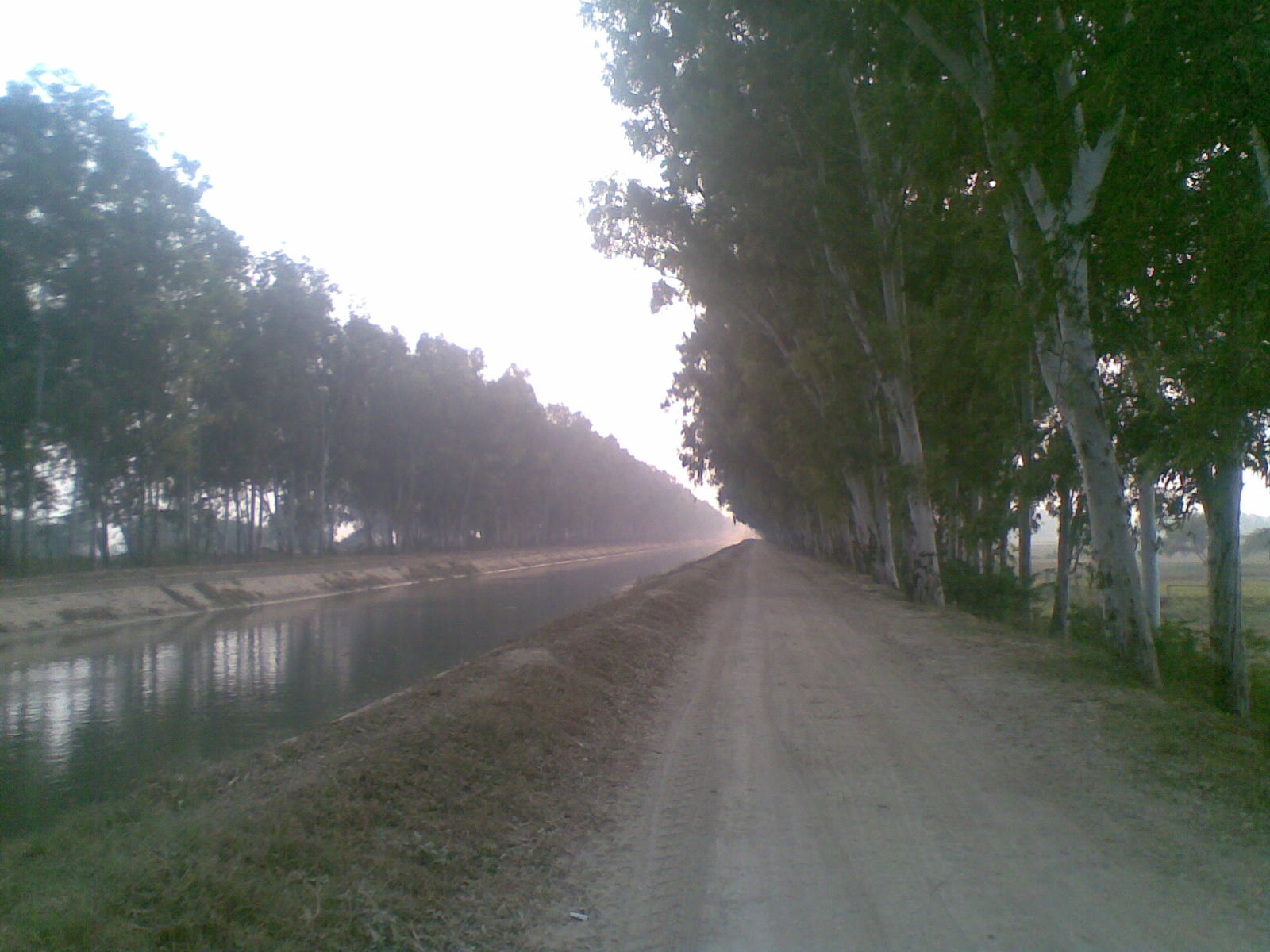
Canal of Rithal Village.

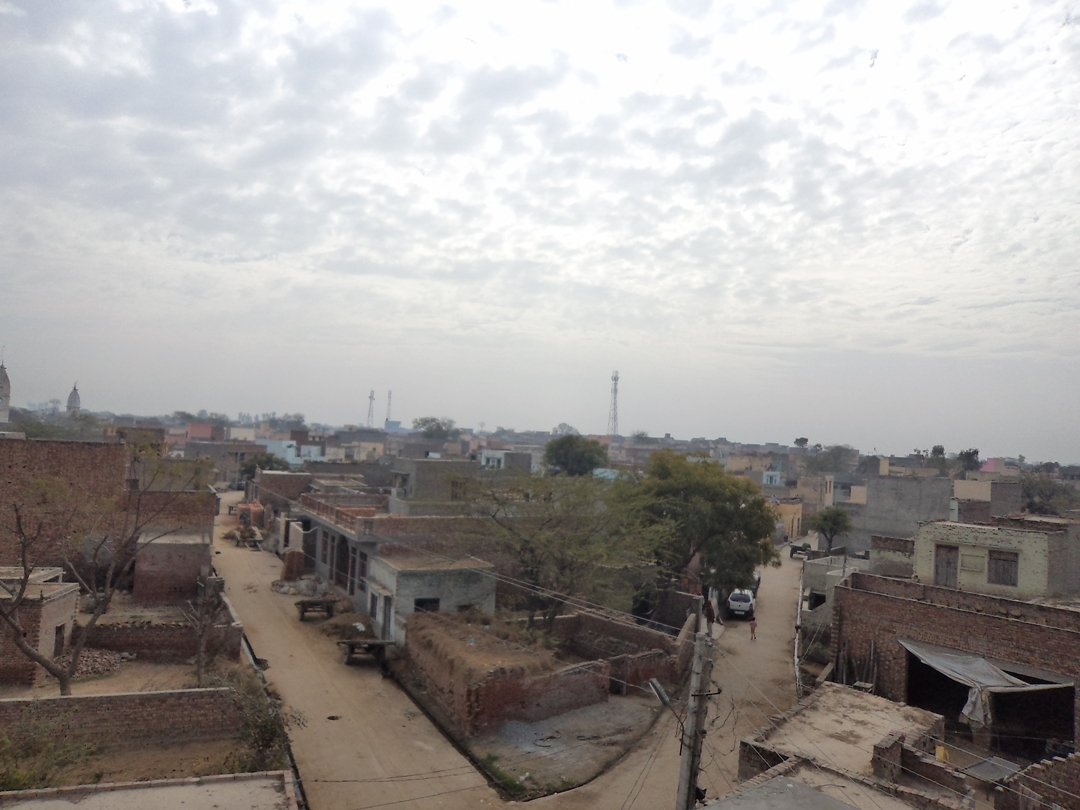
View of Rithal

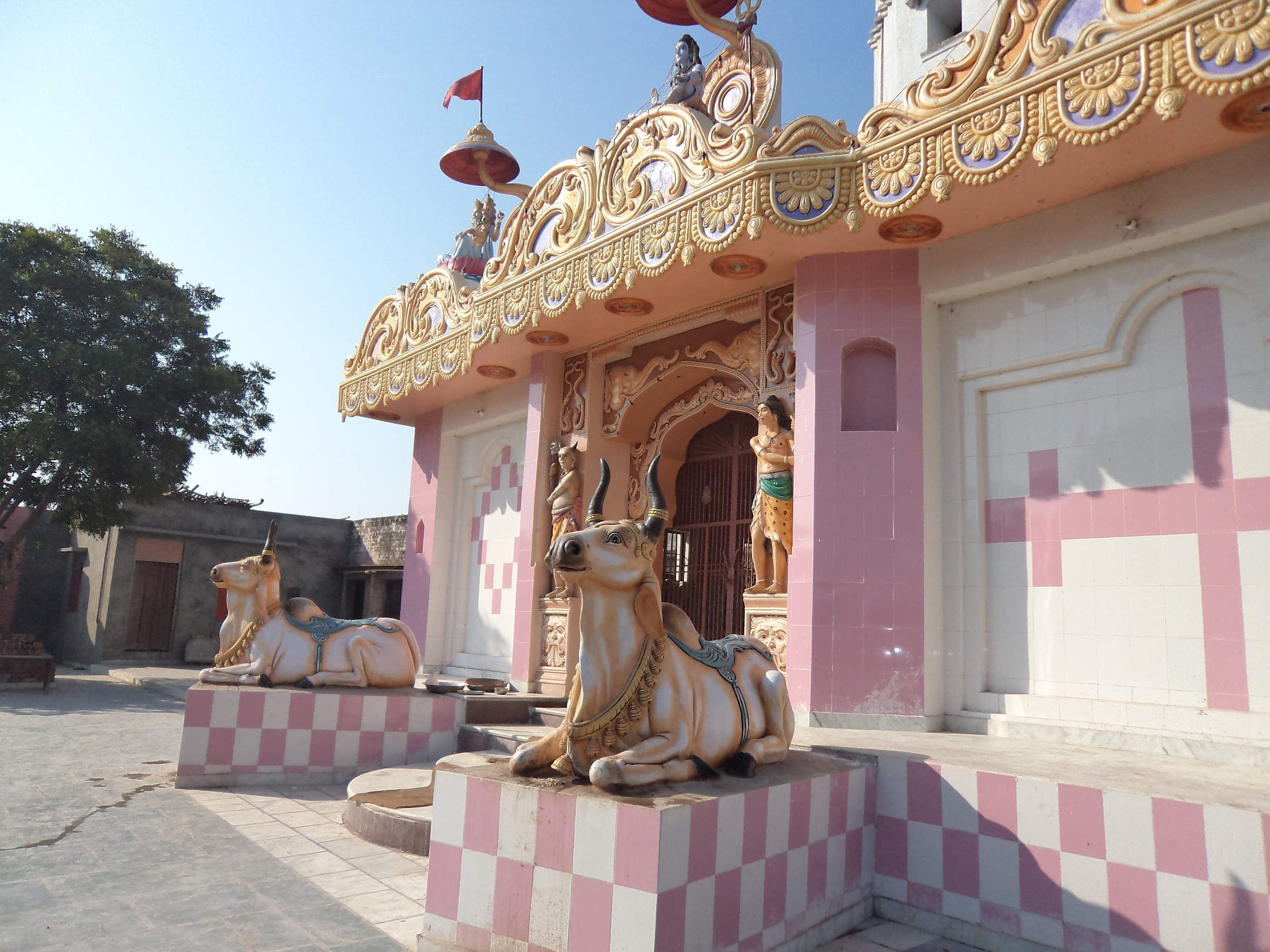
Temple of Rithal village

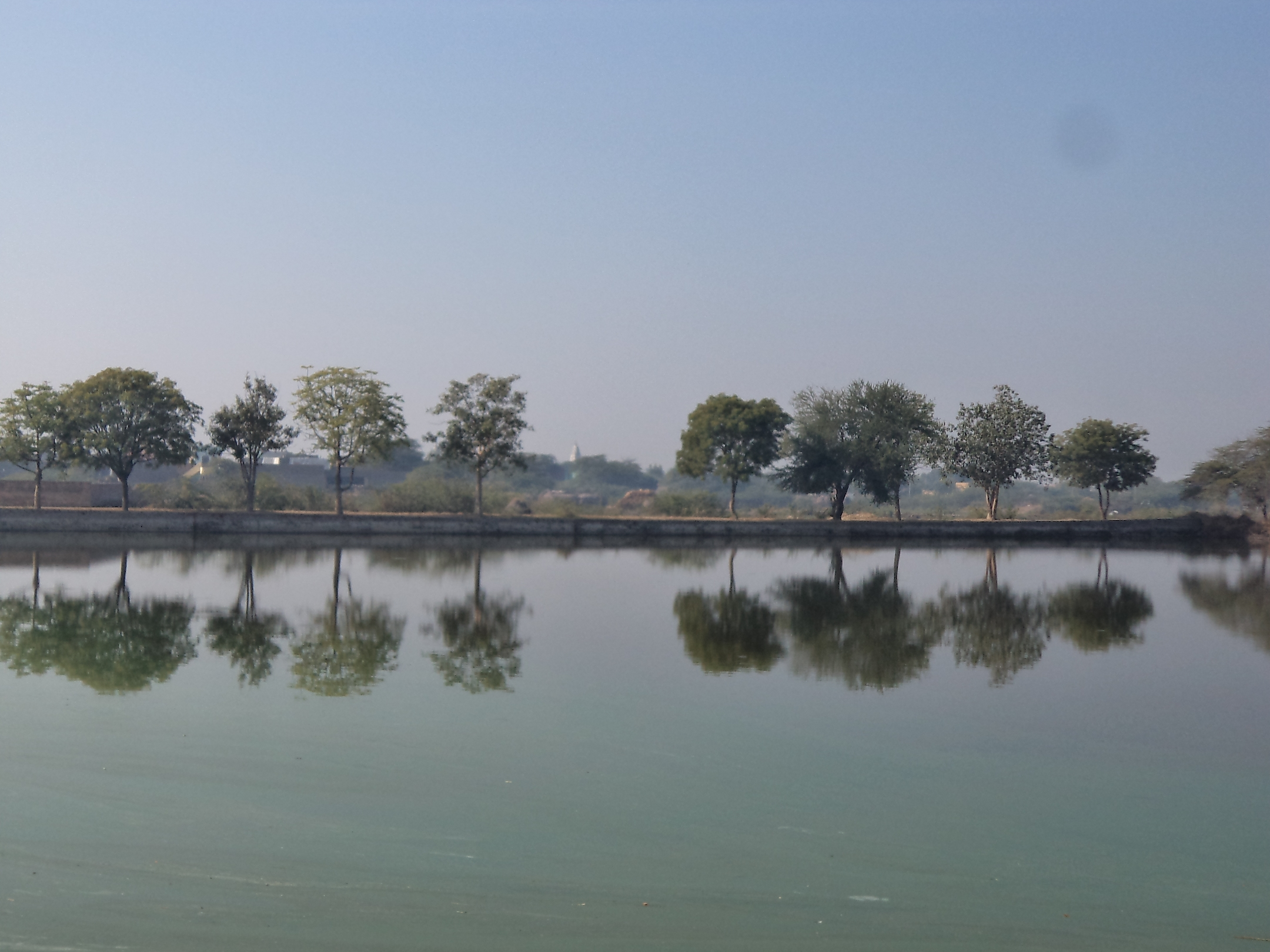
One more Pond of village Rithal (Johad). Name of this pond is "Nya Johad".

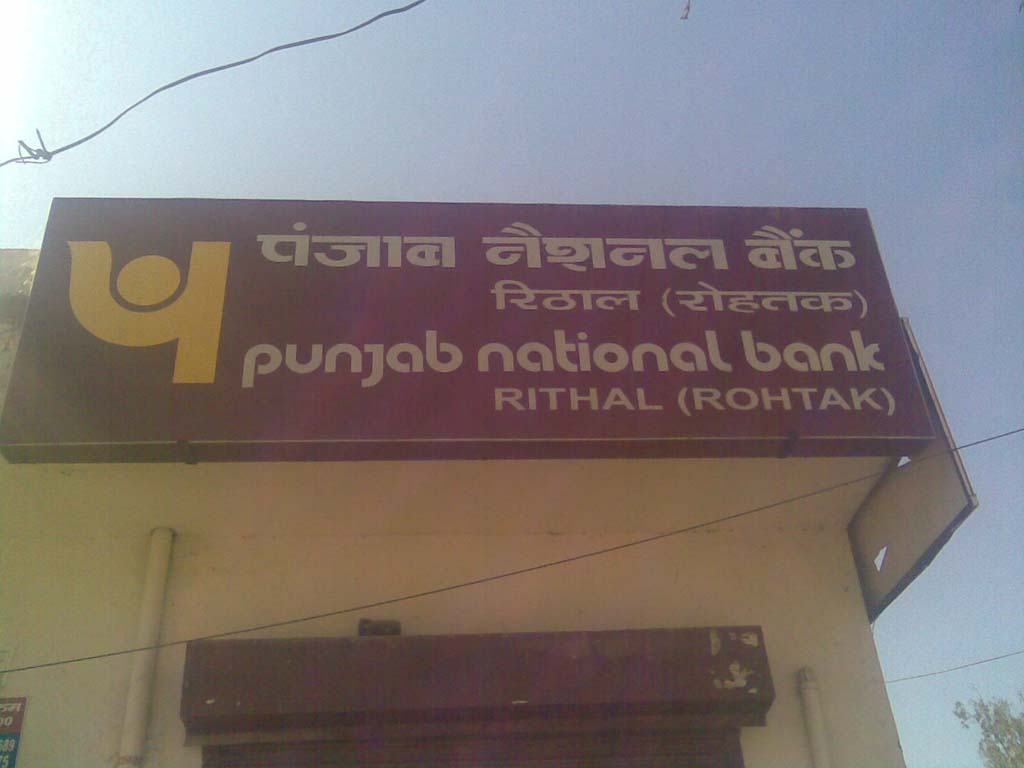
Punjab National Bank Branch in village Rithal

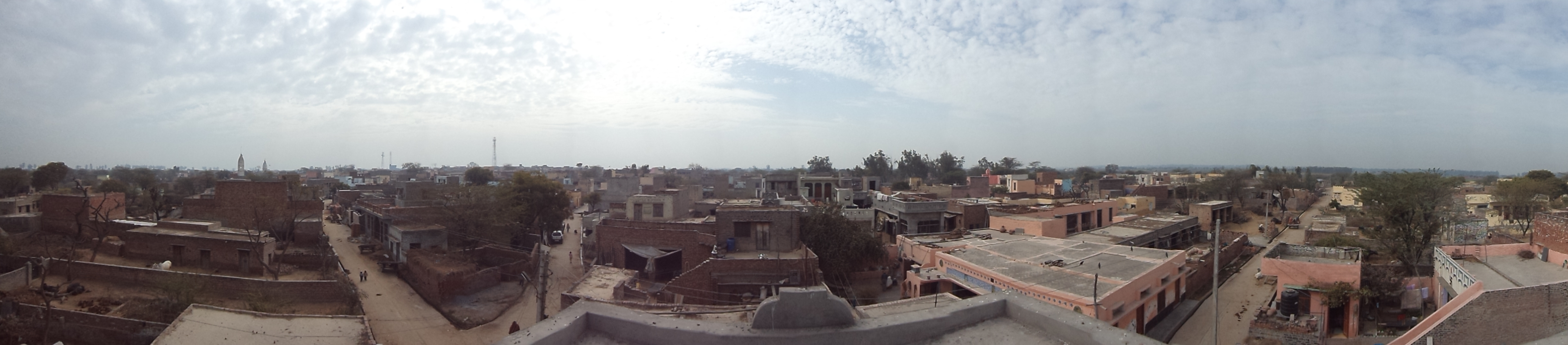
view of village rithal

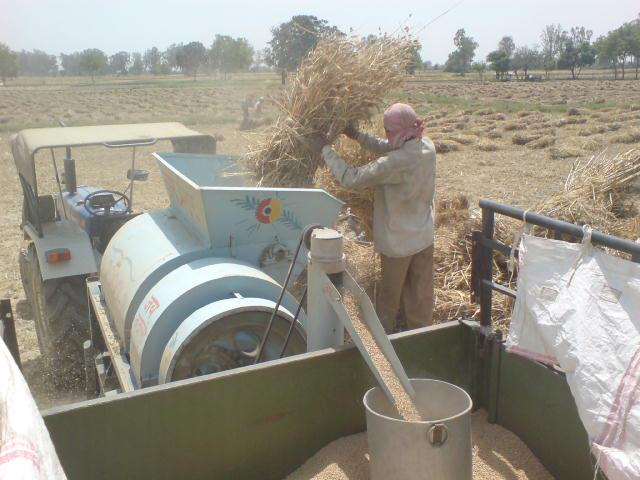
Gehun Nikalna
