= List of 2017 box office number-one films in Taipei =

This is a list of films which have reached number one at the weekend box office in Taipei, Taiwan during 2017.

== Films ==
Week	Weekend end date	Film	Weekend gross (in 10,000 New Taiwan Dollar)	Cumulative box office (in 10,000 New Taiwan Dollar)
1	January 1, 2017	The Great Wall	$1,438	$1,687
2	January 8, 2017	The Great Wall	$628	$3,090
3	January 15, 2017	La La Land	$479	$4,712
4	January 22, 2017	XXX: Return of Xander Cage	$1,697	$1,697
5	January 29, 2017	Resident Evil: The Final Chapter	$1,723	$2,528
6	February 5, 2017	Split	$1,733	$1,733
7	February 12, 2017	Split	$1,069	$4,044
8	February 19, 2017	Split	$674	$5,419
9	February 26, 2017	A Dog's Purpose	$803	$803
10	March 5, 2017	Logan	$2,512	$4,836
11	March 12, 2017	Kong: Skull Island	$2,845	$3,363
12	March 19, 2017	Beauty and the Beast	$2,376	$2,794
13	March 26, 2017	Beauty and the Beast	$1,745	$5,724
14	April 2, 2017	Ghost in the Shell	$1,212	$1,438
15	April 9, 2017	Dangal	$670	$2,126
16	April 16, 2017	The Fate of the Furious	$5,791	$8,149
17	April 23, 2017	The Fate of the Furious	$3,260	$13,876
18	April 30, 2017	Guardians of the Galaxy Vol. 2	$1,882	$2,501
19	May 7, 2017	Guardians of the Galaxy Vol. 2	$822	$4,262
20	May 14, 2017	Alien: Covenant	$1,084	$1,650
21	May 21, 2017	Alien: Covenant	$585	$2,685
22	May 28, 2017	Pirates of the Caribbean: Dead Men Tell No Tales	$2,545	$3,486
23	June 4, 2017	Wonder Woman	$2,751	$5,174
24	June 11, 2017	The Mummy	$3,334	$4,770
25	June 18, 2017	The Mummy	$1,546	$7,523
26	June 25, 2017	Transformers: The Last Knight	$2,448	$3,564
27	July 2, 2017	Despicable Me 3	$1,843	$2,199
28	July 9, 2017	Spider-Man: Homecoming	$3,386	$5,049
29	July 16, 2017	War for the Planet of the Apes	$1,814	$2,272
30	July 23, 2017	Dunkirk	$1,512	$1,872
31	July 30, 2017	Dunkirk	$827	$3,513
32	August 6, 2017	Bad Genius	$740	$2,784
33	August 13, 2017	Annabelle: Creation	$1,209	$1,549
34	August 20, 2017	The Hitman's Bodyguard	$1,026	$1,026
35	August 27, 2017	American Made	$999	$999
36	September 3, 2017	The Tag-Along 2	$540	$2,084
37	September 10, 2017	It	$939	$1,534
38	September 17, 2017	It	$938	$3,189
39	September 24, 2017	Kingsman: The Golden Circle	$4,107	$5,728
40	October 1, 2017	Kingsman: The Golden Circle	$1,795	$9,149
41	October 8, 2017	Blade Runner 2049	$954	$954
42	October 15, 2017	Geostorm	$1,987	$1,987
43	October 22, 2017	Geostorm	$1,644	$4,767
44	October 29, 2017	Thor: Ragnarok	$3,607	$5,342
45	November 5, 2017	Thor: Ragnarok	$1,834	$8,427
46	November 12, 2017	Thor: Ragnarok	$870	$9,928
47	November 19, 2017	Justice League	$3,425	$4,252
48	November 26, 2017	Justice League	$1,521	$7,011
49	December 3, 2017	The Bold, the Corrupt, and the Beautiful	$925	$1,982
50	December 10, 2017	Murder on the Orient Express	$1,386	$1,386
51	December 17, 2017	Star Wars: The Last Jedi	$1,686	$2,333
52	December 24, 2017	Along with the Gods: The Two Worlds	$793	$793
53	December 31, 2017	Jumanji: Welcome to the Jungle	$2,044	$2,638

== See also ==
- 2017 Taiwanese films
- List of highest-grossing films in Taiwan
