= Dadri, Haryana Assembly constituency =

Constituency of the Haryana legislative assembly in India

Coordinates: 28.60°N 76.27°E

Dadri Assembly constituency
- Constituency No. 56 for the Haryana Legislative Assembly

Constituency details
- Country: India
- Region: North India
- State: Haryana
- District: Charkhi Dadri
- Lok Sabha constituency: Bhiwani–Mahendragarh
- Established: 1967
- Total electors: 2,07,178
- Reservation: None

Member of Legislative Assembly
- 15th Haryana Legislative Assembly
- Incumbent Sunil Satpal Sangwan
- Party: BJP
- Elected year: 2024

Charkhi Dadri Assembly constituency is one of the 90 Vidhan Sabha constituencies in Haryana state in northern India.

== Overview ==
Dadri (constituency number 56) is one of the 2 Assembly constituencies located in Charkhi Dadri district. This constituency covers the Dadri municipal committee and part of Dadri tehsil.

Dadri is part of Bhiwani-Mahendragarh Lok Sabha constituency along with eight other Assembly segments, namely, Loharu, Tosham and Bhiwani in Bhiwani district, Badhra in Charkhi Dadri and Ateli, Mahendragarh, Narnaul and Nangal Chaudhry in Mahendragarh district. This seat is famous because of the association of wrestler Babita Phogat with it. She contested from this seat in the 2019 Assembly Elections on a BJP ticket, but lost to Independent candidate Sombir Sangwan.

== Members of Legislative Assembly ==
Year	Member	Party
1967	Ganpat Rai	Indian National Congress
1968	Ganpat Rai	Indian National Congress
1972	Ganpat Rai	Indian National Congress
1977	Master Hukam Singh Phogat	Janata Party
1982	Master Hukam Singh Phogat	Lokdal
1987	Master Hukam Singh Phogat	Lokdal
1991	Dharampal Sangwan	Haryana Vikas Party
1996	Satpal Sangwan	Haryana Vikas Party
2000	Jagjit Singh Sangwan	Nationalist Congress Party
2005	Nirpender Singh Sangwan	Indian National Congress
2009	Satpal Sangwan	Indian National Congress
2014	Rajdeep Singh Phogat	Indian National Lok Dal
2019	Somveer Sangwan	Independent politician
2024	Sunil Satpal Sangwan	Bharatiya Janata Party

== Election results ==
=== Assembly Election 2024 ===
2024 Haryana Legislative Assembly election: Dadri
Party	Candidate	Votes	%	±%
BJP	Sunil Satpal Sangwan	65,568	46.08	▲26.48
INC	Dr manisha Sangwan	63,611	44.70	▲38.36
Independent	Sanjay Chhaparia	3,713	2.61	New
Independent	Ajit Singh	3,369	2.37	New
JJP	Rajdeep Singh	1,917	1.35	▼22.03
AAP	Dhan Raj Singh	1,339	0.94	New
BSP	Anand Sheoran	1,036	0.73	▼5.32
NOTA	None of the Above	432	0.30	▼0.17
Margin of victory		1,957	1.38	▼9.91
Turnout		1,42,304	68.30	▲3.19
Registered electors		2,07,178		▲7.23
BJP gain from Independent		Swing	▲11.41	

=== Assembly Election 2019 ===
2019 Haryana Legislative Assembly election: Dadri
Party	Candidate	Votes	%	±%
Independent	Somveer Sangwan	43,849	34.66	New
JJP	Satpal Sangwan	29,577	23.38	New
BJP	Babita Kumari	24,786	19.59	▼12.01
RJP	Surender Singh	8,728	6.90	New
	Major =Indian National Congress	8,022	6.34	▼5.52
	Bakshi Saini	1750=6.05		▲4.96
INLD	Nitin Pal Janghu	919	0.73	▼32.09
Margin of victory		14,272	11.28	▲10.06
Turnout		1,26,502	65.11	▼10.00
Registered electors		1,94,299		▲10.35
Independent gain from Indian National		Swing	▲1.85	

=== Assembly Election 2014 ===
2014 Haryana Legislative Assembly election: Dadri
Party	Candidate	Votes	%	±%
INLD	Rajdeep	43,400	32.82	▲4.76
BJP	Somveer Sangwan	41,790	31.60	▲28.4
HJC(BL)	Surender Singh	23,140	17.58	▼10.71
INC	Satpal Sangwan	15,690	11.86	▼14.9
Independent	Bakshi Saini	3,456	2.61	New
BSP	Vinod Kumar	1,439	1.09	▼2.68
Margin of victory		1,610	1.22	▲1.07
Turnout		1,32,246	75.11	▲7.83
Registered electors		1,76,077		▲20.23
INLD gain from HJC(BL)		Swing	▲4.61	

=== Assembly Election 2009 ===
2009 Haryana Legislative Assembly election: Dadri
Party	Candidate	Votes	%	±%
HJC(BL)	Satpal	27,790	28.21	New
INLD	Rajdeep	27,645	28.06	▲8.51
INC	Major Nirpender Singh Sangwan	26,368	26.76	▼3.68
NCP	Anil Kaushik	6,655	6.76	New
BSP	Somveer Sangwan	3,713	3.77	▲3.2
BJP	Om Prakash Dhankar	3,156	3.20	▲1.48
Margin of victory		145	0.15	▼1.20
Turnout		98,519	67.27	▼6.33
Registered electors		1,46,447		▲12.52
HJC(BL) gain from INC		Swing	▼2.23	

=== Assembly Election 2005 ===
2005 Haryana Legislative Assembly election: Dadri
Party	Candidate	Votes	%	±%
INC	Nirpender	29,164	30.44	▲22.94
Independent	Satpal	27,874	29.10	New
INLD	Vijay Prakash	18,728	19.55	▼9.89
Independent	Somveer Sangwan	14,653	15.30	New
BJP	Balwan	1,655	1.73	New
SP	Jaivir Singh	700	0.73	New
RLD	Dharampal	644	0.67	New
BSP	Jaivir Singh	541	0.56	▼0.36
Margin of victory		1,290	1.35	▲0.36
Turnout		95,802	73.61	▲4.62
Registered electors		1,30,154		▲14.10
INC gain from NCP		Swing	▲0.01	

=== Assembly Election 2000 ===
2000 Haryana Legislative Assembly election: Dadri
Party	Candidate	Votes	%	±%
NCP	Jagjit Singh	23,943	30.43	New
INLD	Shakuntla	23,166	29.44	New
HVP	Satpal S/O Mange Ram	18,459	23.46	▼21.35
INC	Hoshiar Singh S/O Dulla Ram	5,906	7.51	▼22.11
Independent	Rajveer	3,126	3.97	New
Independent	Ramphal	2,325	2.95	New
BSP	Raj Singh	725	0.92	New
Independent	Sanjay	454	0.58	New
Margin of victory		777	0.99	▼14.20
Turnout		78,688	69.90	▲2.19
Registered electors		1,14,066		▲1.34
NCP gain from HVP		Swing	▼14.38	

=== Assembly Election 1996 ===
1996 Haryana Legislative Assembly election: Dadri
Party	Candidate	Votes	%	±%
HVP	Satpal Sangwan	33,690	44.81	▲11.5
INC	Jagjit Singh	22,269	29.62	▼3.56
SAP	Shakuntla Devi	9,968	13.26	New
SP	Hukam Singh	4,006	5.33	New
Independent	Ganpat Ram	1,474	1.96	New
Independent	Shiv Charan	971	1.29	New
JP	Krishan Kumar	484	0.64	▼21.93
Margin of victory		11,421	15.19	▲15.06
Turnout		75,185	68.64	▲6.36
Registered electors		1,12,562		▲8.31
HVP hold		Swing	▲11.50	

=== Assembly Election 1991 ===
1991 Haryana Legislative Assembly election: Dadri
Party	Candidate	Votes	%	±%
HVP	Daharampal Singh	20,918	33.31	New
INC	Jagjeet Singh	20,838	33.18	▲6.12
JP	Hukam Singh	14,179	22.58	New
Independent	Chander Bhan	2,808	4.47	New
BJP	Ishwar Singh	2,547	4.06	New
Independent	Trilok Chand Saini	389	0.62	New
Independent	Om Parkash S/O Ram Sarup	360	0.57	New
Margin of victory		80	0.13	▼15.58
Turnout		62,807	62.65	▼3.66
Registered electors		1,03,925		▲10.94
HVP gain from LKD		Swing	▼9.46	

=== Assembly Election 1987 ===
1987 Haryana Legislative Assembly election: Dadri
Party	Candidate	Votes	%	±%
LKD	Hukam Singh	25,677	42.76	▲3.16
INC	Rishal Singh	16,245	27.05	▼4.03
Independent	Jagjit Singh	14,073	23.44	New
Independent	Ram Phal Sharma	1,518	2.53	New
VHP	Gunpal Singh	611	1.02	New
Independent	Daya Nand	553	0.92	New
Independent	Surat Singh	473	0.79	New
Margin of victory		9,432	15.71	▲7.19
Turnout		60,045	66.37	▼3.06
Registered electors		93,677		▲18.98
LKD hold		Swing	▲3.16	

=== Assembly Election 1982 ===
1982 Haryana Legislative Assembly election: Dadri
Party	Candidate	Votes	%	±%
LKD	Hukam Singh	20,943	39.61	New
INC	Jagjit Singh	16,439	31.09	▲28.93
Independent	Dharam Singh	12,450	23.55	New
Independent	Daya Nand	1,576	2.98	New
Independent	Narinder Singh	269	0.51	New
Margin of victory		4,504	8.52	▼3.88
Turnout		52,877	68.32	▲6.14
Registered electors		78,734		▲16.80
LKD gain from JP		Swing	▲4.48	

=== Assembly Election 1977 ===
1977 Haryana Legislative Assembly election: Dadri
Party	Candidate	Votes	%	±%
JP	Hukam Singh	14,449	35.13	New
Independent	Ganpat Rai	9,349	22.73	New
CPI(M)	Dharam Singh	6,820	16.58	New
VHP	Nihal Singh	4,100	9.97	New
Independent	Amar Singh	2,627	6.39	New
Independent	Sumer Singh	1,797	4.37	New
INC	Prema Nand	890	2.16	▼38.9
Independent	Baljit Singh	382	0.93	New
Independent	Narinder Pal	364	0.88	New
Margin of victory		5,100	12.40	▲5.37
Turnout		41,134	61.87	▲4.24
Registered electors		67,412		▲2.72
JP gain from INC(O)		Swing	▼12.97	

=== Assembly Election 1972 ===
1972 Haryana Legislative Assembly election: Dadri
Party	Candidate	Votes	%	±%
INC(O)	Ganpat Rai	17,922	48.10	New
INC	Harnam Singh	15,303	41.07	▼12.34
SSP	Chander Singh	2,805	7.53	New
RPI(K)	Shish Pal Singh	901	2.42	New
Independent	Umed Singh	331	0.89	New
Margin of victory		2,619	7.03	▼15.28
Turnout		37,262	58.50	▲17.59
Registered electors		65,626		▲15.78
INC(O) gain from INC		Swing	▼5.31	

=== Assembly Election 1968 ===
1968 Haryana Legislative Assembly election: Dadri
Party	Candidate	Votes	%	±%
INC	Ganpat Rai	11,864	53.41	▲14.71
SSP	Harnam Singh	6,908	31.10	▼3.72
SWA	Lalji Ram	1,872	8.43	New
ABJS	Duli	878	3.95	▼3.04
Independent	Chander Singh	422	1.90	New
Independent	Bhikhu Ram	270	1.22	New
Margin of victory		4,956	22.31	▲18.43
Turnout		22,214	40.23	▼25.46
Registered electors		56,681		▲2.89
INC hold		Swing	▲14.71	

=== Assembly Election 1967 ===
1967 Haryana Legislative Assembly election: Dadri
Party	Candidate	Votes	%	±%
INC	Ganpat Rai	13,782	38.70	New
SSP	Harnam Singh	12,400	34.82	New
Independent	L. Ram	4,715	13.24	New
ABJS	Parbhu	2,491	6.99	New
RPI	J. Rai	700	1.97	New
Independent	T. Ram	531	1.49	New
Independent	S. Ram	524	1.47	New
Independent	M. Din	471	1.32	New
Margin of victory		1,382	3.88	
Turnout		35,614	68.59	
Registered electors		55,089		
INC win (new seat)				
