= Sunil Satpal Sangwan =

Indian politician (1947–2025)

Member of Haryana Legislative Assembly
- In office 8 October 2002 – 3 March 2025
- Preceded by: Somveer Sangwan
- Constituency: Dadri

Personal details
- Born: 9 May 1947
- Died: 3 March 2025 (aged 77) Gurugram, Haryana, India
- Party: Bharatiya Janata Party
- Parent: Sh.Satpal Sangwan
- Profession: Politician

Sunil Satpal Sangwan (9 May 1947 – 3 March 2025) was an Indian politician from Haryana. He was a Member of the Haryana Legislative Assembly from 2024.

== Professional career ==
Sunil Sangwan was the son of Satpal Sangwan, who served as the Revenue and Cooperation Minister in the Haryana government. Sunil began his career in 2002 in the Haryana Prisons Department, serving as Deputy Superintendent of Jail at Bhondsi Jail. He later became the Superintendent of the same jail, before opting for voluntary retirement (VRS).

== Political career ==
After serving in the prisons department for over 22 years, Sangwan applied for voluntary retirement. His application was approved by the Haryana Home Department on 1 September 2024, and he officially joined the Bharatiya Janata Party (BJP) on 3 September 2024.

He contested the 2024 Dadri, Haryana Assembly constituency as a Bharatiya Janata Party candidate, defeating his closest rival, Congress candidate Manisha Sangwan, by a margin of 1,957 votes. This victory marked his first tenure as an MLA.

== See also ==
- 2024 Haryana Legislative Assembly election
- Haryana Legislative Assembly
