= Somveer Sangwan =

Indian politician

Sombir Sangwan

Member of the Haryana Legislative Assembly
- In office 2019–2024
- Preceded by: Rajdeep Phogat
- Succeeded by: Sunil Satpal Sangwan
- Constituency: Dadri

Personal details
- Born: May 20, 1967 (age 58)
- Party: Independent candidate
- Other political affiliations: Bahujan Samaj Party; Bharatiya Janata Party

Sombir Sangwan (May 20, 1967) is an Indian politician. He was elected to the Haryana Legislative Assembly from Dadri in the 2019 Haryana Legislative Assembly election as a member and Independent candidate. Previously, he was associated with Bharatiya Janata Party.

== Political career ==
Somveer Sangwan entered politics as an independent candidate, contesting from Dadri in the 2005 Haryana Legislative Assembly election, where he finished in third place. Later, he joined the Bahujan Samaj Party (BSP) and contested the 2009 Haryana Legislative Assembly election, securing fourth place.

In 2014, he joined the Bharatiya Janata Party (BJP) and contested the 2014 Haryana Legislative Assembly election as a BJP candidate. He lost to INLD candidate Rajdeep Phogat by a narrow margin of 1,610 votes.

After failing to secure a BJP ticket for the 2019 Haryana Legislative Assembly election, Sangwan contested as an independent candidate from Dadri and won with a majority of 14,272 votes against his closest rival, Jannayak Janta Party (JJP) candidate Sunil Satpal Sangwan.

== See also ==
Bharatiya Janata Party, Haryana

2019 Haryana Legislative Assembly election
