= Dipanshi Phogat =

Indian wrestler

Personal information
- Nationality: Indian
- Born: 2008 (age 17–18) Rithal, Rohtak district, Haryana, India

Sport
- Country: India
- Sport: Wrestling
- Weight class: 50 kg
- Event: Freestyle
- Club: Sir Chhotu Ram Akhara
- Coach: Virender Dahiya, Kosei Akaishi
Medal record
Representing India
Asian U17 Championships
| Gold medal – first place | 2024 | 46 kg |
Asian U15 Championships
| Gold medal – first place | 2022 | 39 kg |
| Gold medal – first place | 2023 | 42 kg |

Dipanshi Phogat (born 2008) is an Indian freestyle wrestler from Haryana, who competes in the 50 kg weight category. She made her debut at the 2026 Asian Games as part of the Indian team competing in the 50 kg category.

== Early life ==
Phogat is from Rithal village, Rohtak district, Haryana. She took to wrestling at the age of eight in 2017. Her father, Surender Phogat, was a wrestler and her mother, Meenu, was a kabaddi player. She learnt her basics under coach Mandeep Singh at the wrestling club at Sir Chhotu Ram Akara, which produced Olympic medallist Sakshi Malik. For Asian Games, she trained under India's national women's wrestling coach, Virender Dahiya, and Japanese coach Kosei Akaishi.

== Career ==
Phogat won the selection trials on her senior debut at the KD Jadhav Indoor Stadium in New Delhi on May 30 to make it to the six-member wrestling squad for the 2026 Asian Games.

In the 2026 Asian Games, she lost to Japanese Yui Susaki in the women's 50 kg pre-quarterfinal by a 0-10 technical superiority. But since Susaki made the final, the Indian was back in medal contention after beating Cambodia's Samnang Dit 10–0 in the repechage round. She lost to Kazakhstan's Zeinip Bayanova in the bronze play-off.

She won her first gold medal in the National under 15 championships. In 2022, she won three medals in the Asian Sub-Junior Championships, a gold in the 39 kg U-15 in 2022 followed by another gold in the 42 kg in 2023. She won the U-17 title in the 46 kg category in 2024.
