= Akhada: The Authorized Biography of Mahavir Singh Phogat =

Biography of the Indian amateur wrestler Mahavir Singh Phogat

- Front Cover of the book
- Author: Saurabh Duggal
- Language: English
- Genre: Biography
- Publisher: Hachette UK
- Publication date: 7 January 2017
- Publication place: India
- Pages: 224 pages
- ISBN: 978-93-5195-134-6

Akhada: The Authorized Biography of Mahavir Singh Phogat is the official biography of the Indian wrestling coach and amateur wrestler Mahavir Singh Phogat. It was written by Saurabh Duggal, and published in 2017.

It describes Phogat's life with his daughters and nieces hailing from a small village in Haryana to winning the medals for the country. The story was popularised as the Hindi biographical 2016 film Dangal.
