= Music of Northeast China =

Music of Northeast China is tied closely to the region's history. Musical traditions of the Bang Zi Theatre and folk instruments such as the Dizi, Xiao, and Baijiao Gu originate in the region. Folk songs from the northeast are noted for their contributions to nationalistic music. The popular communist-era song “The East is Red” is based upon a traditional Northern Shaanxi melody. The popularity of Western musical traditions in the Harbin province is internationally recognized, with the northern city being named a ‘music city’ in 2010 by the United Nations. Contemporary folk, as well as modern pop music, continue to contribute to the diverse musical traditions of the region. Prominent performers from the Northeast include the mid-20th-century film composer Lei Zhenbang and pop stars Xiao Ke and Na Ying.

== Regional history ==
=== Harbin ===
China's oldest symphony orchestra, the Harbin Symphony Orchestra, was founded in 1908, and China's first music school ‘Harbin's No.1 music school’ was founded twenty years later in 1928. The city is described as a “gateway for Western Classical Music in China”, a large Jewish diaspora in the region of some 20,000 throughout the 1920s in many ways credited for the city's rich musical heritage.

The Harbin Summer music festival was established in 1958 and in 2010 the United Nations recognised Harbin as a Music City.

== Traditional music ==
Styles of traditional folk singing within the Northeastern region mirror the rhythmic and melodic intonations of the regional dialect.

=== Manchurian shamanism ===
Odd numbers play a significant role in the folk music traditions of China's Northeastern region. Unique to Manchu Shamanism are the practices of the division of the three levels of the cosmos, the worshipping of three goddesses, and the belief of three souls. The significance of odd numbers is reflected in drumming patterns that form the musical accompaniment to Manchu ritual practices.

Rhythmic patterns are devised based on the placement of accents on 3 beats, 5 beats, 7 beats, or 9 beats; each conveying a different spiritual meaning. Ethnomusicologist Lisha Li maintains that “80% of Manchu shamanic music is based upon the 3,5,7,9 beat”. Rhythmic unison between the singer and drummer is a common musical device employed in Northeastern ritual music. Manchurian music has no known notation and is largely based upon the pentatonic system. This system employs five modes, “the Kung, Shang, Chiao, Chih, and Yu (these are the equivalent of do, re, mi, sol, la,)," with 7 notes within each mode. Traditionally, shamanic melodies are heavily based on 3 notes with a very narrow pitch range.

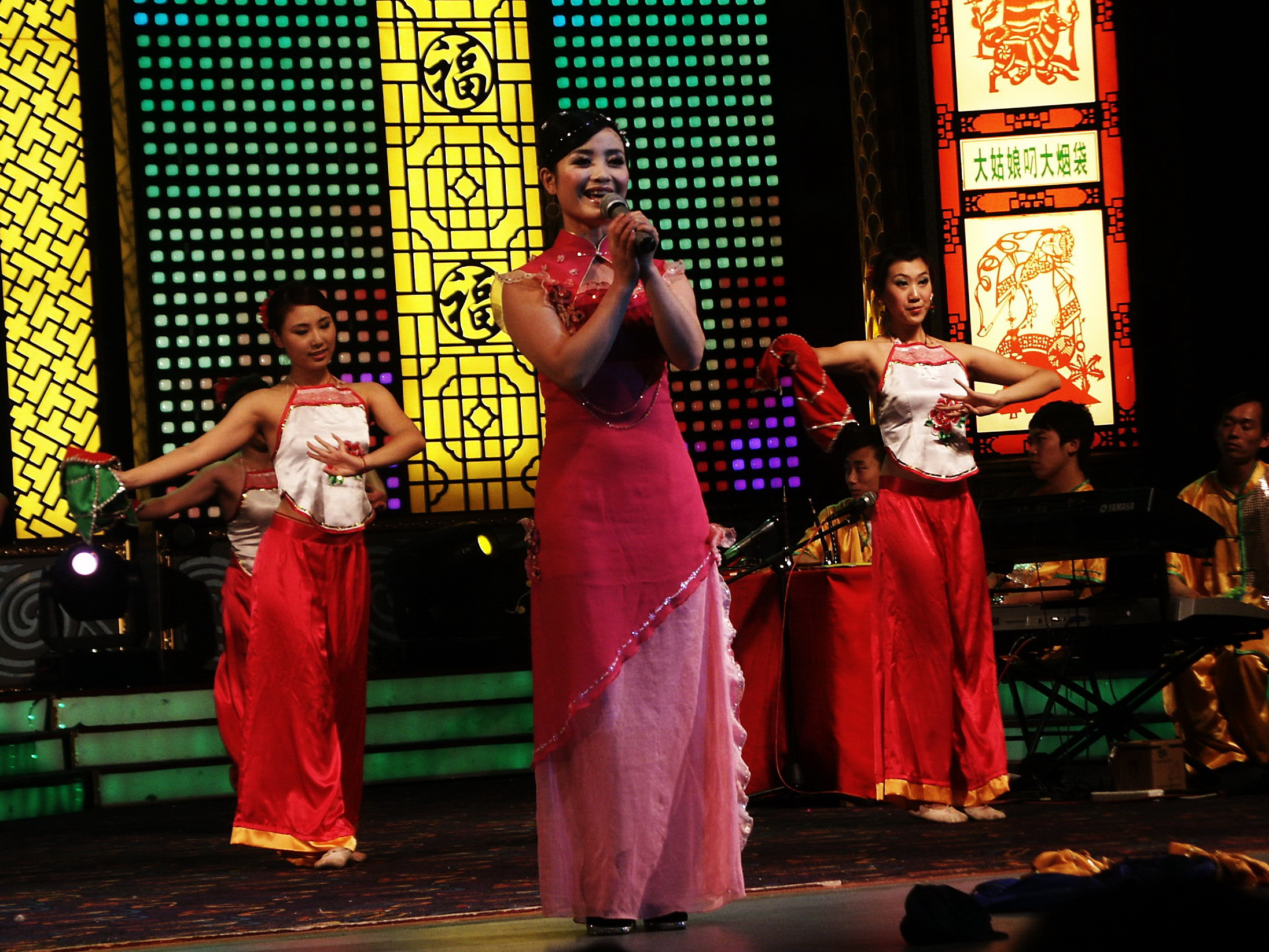
Photograph of an Er-ren Zhuan performance

=== Er-Ren Zhuan ===
Popular in the Liaoning, Heilong and Jilin provinces, Er-Ren Zhuan is a folk style that blends art music and dance. The style blends performative art with singing and dancing based upon multiple dialects found throughout Northern China. Often the performances are based on folk-stories and fables. The style rose to fame at the dawn of the 21st century, gaining national and international notoriety. Famous performers include Zhao Benshan who performed the art form on national TV from 1990 to 2011 for the televised Lunar New Year Gala.

=== Xibo peoples ===
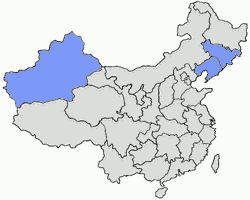
A map highlighting the migration of the Xibo people's eastward

The Xibo, Sibe or Xibe people are a traditionally nomadic ethnic group from the Northern XinJian Yili region who emigrated to the northeast during the Qing dynasty. Much of the group's cultural music is heavily inspired by the customs and pastoral scenes of China's north. The traditional music of the Xibo people consists of many different genres such as folk, dance, and shamanic music.

Traditional instruments from the Xibo region include:

Feichaku - an ancient wind instrument made of bamboo, often played in courting rituals

Mokena - A metal stringed instrument used largely for improvisation

Dongbuer - A plucked string instrument often played to accompany dance pieces

Throughout the 1980s collections of Xibo music began circulation in music schools throughout Northeast China. These publications are considered a “very valuable source” by ethnomusicologists who fear that the traditional practices are not being passed onto the younger generations.

Such collections include:

- “Collection of Chinese Folk Songs”
- “Collection of Chinese Instrumental Music”
- “Collection of Chinese Folk Dances
- “Xibo Folk Songs”
- “Xibo Ethnical Songs”

==== Beilun dance ====
Beilun or Xibobelun is the name given to dance music of the Xibo peoples, a genre which shares many similarities with traditional Mongolion dance. Scholars have recorded 10 different sub-genres of Xibo dance styles, each with their own unique characteristics heavily based upon rhythmic and melodic improvisation. Beilun dance music is closely related to the shamanic dances of the Xibo peoples. As such it is largely composed of rhythmic patterns created by percussion instruments and dancers clapping.

== Nationalistic music ==
Music of the period is described as a “strong emotional force in shaping Chinese consciousness during the two major military conflicts in the 1930s and 1940s”. Many songs were produced and employed politically by the Communist party as a “political tool” in working toward the defeat of both the Nationalists and the Japanese.

Songs from the period were composed to be sung aloud in order to reach the largely illiterate population, the collective practice of singing bolstering patriotic sentiments and encouraging a sense of community. During the Jangxi soviet period Mao placed emphasis on the importance of gathering folk tunes, due to the appeal of their “collectivity and simplicity”.

Notable north eastern songbooks from the period include:

- Folk Songs of Hebei which was mimographed
- Selected Songs of the Resistance Movement against Japan
- Selected Folk Songs of Northern Shaanxi

Notable songs include:

- ‘The Love Song of Mt. Lüliang’ 1939, written in Shanxi-suiyuan
- ‘On the banks of the Songhua River’
- ‘Fight Resolutely’ 1940, composed in the then Jing-Cha-ji Border Region
- ‘The East is Red’ based on a Northern Shaanxi melody ‘Riding a White Horse’

The piece was first performed in November 1945 by the Northeast Song and Dance Ensemble in Shenyang “and it subsequently became one of the most widely sung tunes in China”. The first Chinese satellite launched on the 24th of April 1970 named Dong Fang Hong I, named after "The East is Red". Throughout its orbit a music player broadcast the popular song.

=== The People's Singing Society ===
The People's Singing Society also known as ‘Mingzhong geyonghui’ was founded in February 1935 in response to the Japanese Invasion of the north eastern region of Manchuria. Liu Liangmu, a well-known member of the society is noted in saying “we are singing for the sake of national liberation”. Liu is known for collecting many well-known choral songs from the period and publishing them in the popular book ‘Collected Songs of Youth’ also known as Qingnian geji. Group Choral music is known to have especially grown in popularity toward the end of the 1930s following the official declaration of war between Japan and China in July 1937. By August 1937 13 choral groups were recorded touring China spreading nationalistic singing traditions.

== Traditional instruments ==
=== Dizi ===
The Chinese Transverse Bamboo flute known as ‘Dizi’ or ‘Di’ is commonly associated with the traditional instrumentation of both Northern ‘Bang Zi’ and Southern ‘Kun Qu’ theatre music. The Di gained widespread popularity throughout the Ming Dynasty and remained a staple of theatre accompaniment for over 250 years until the end of the Qing Dynasty in 1911. Di vary in length and construction in relation to the style of regional music. The Northern ‘Bang Di’ is traditionally over a foot long, made from bamboo and consists of 7 holes covered by a reed membrane, with a pitch range of two octaves.

=== Xiao ===
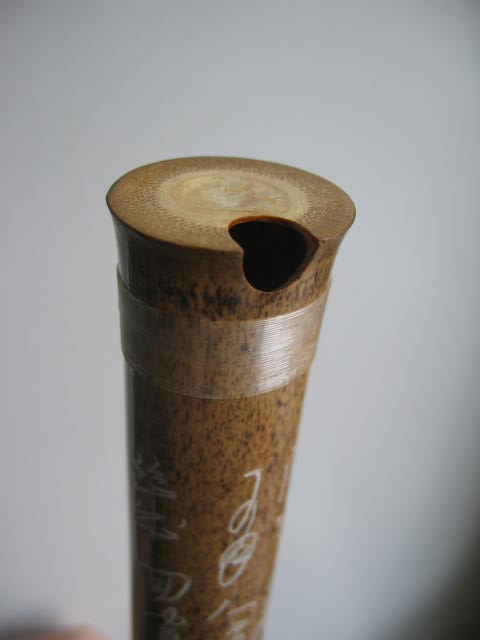
Xiao mouthpiece

Xiao or Dongxiao is a traditional Chinese vertical end blown flute widely used in Chinese folk music for its “mellow and melancholic” tone. The oldest known Xiao, carved from bone is dated circa 6000BC, however the instrument's origin is more commonly attributed to the bamboo flutes of the Han dynasty. The construction of a modern Xiao consists of 7 finger holes and one thumb hole on the back. Between 70 and 80 cm in length the Xiao has a range of two octaves similar to the Di.

The ‘Bei Xiao’ is commonly used in folk music of the northern region and differs from southern variants due to the close U-shaped mouthpiece. Multiple clay statues have been excavated displaying figures playing Xiao style flutes, the earliest dating between 25 - 220 AD.

=== Baijiao Gu ===
The Baijiao Gu, also known as the 'Octagonal Drum', is an instrument widely used in the shamanic and ritualistic practices of the Manchurian peoples. The drum frame is constructed out of wood often decorated with inlaid bone. Small bells similar to the western tambourine are mounted on each side, and a drum skin typically made of snakeskin is played in a struck manner.

Each side of the drum represents a flag of the Manchu people. Folkloric tradition dictates the drum's origin alongside the snare drum during the battles of the Eight Banner Military throughout the Qing Dynasty. Traditionally the drum is often played whilst dancing and is accompanied by a harpist and a singer who recount traditional Chinese stories. The Beijing Monochord Danxian is also commonly accompanied by the Baijiao.

=== Qin ===
Part of the zither family, the Qin or Guqin is a plucked instrument consisting of 7 strings which may produce up to 92 different pitches. Titled “The Instrument of Sages” the Qin is often associated with Confucius due to its deep roots in Chinese music and wider cultural practices.

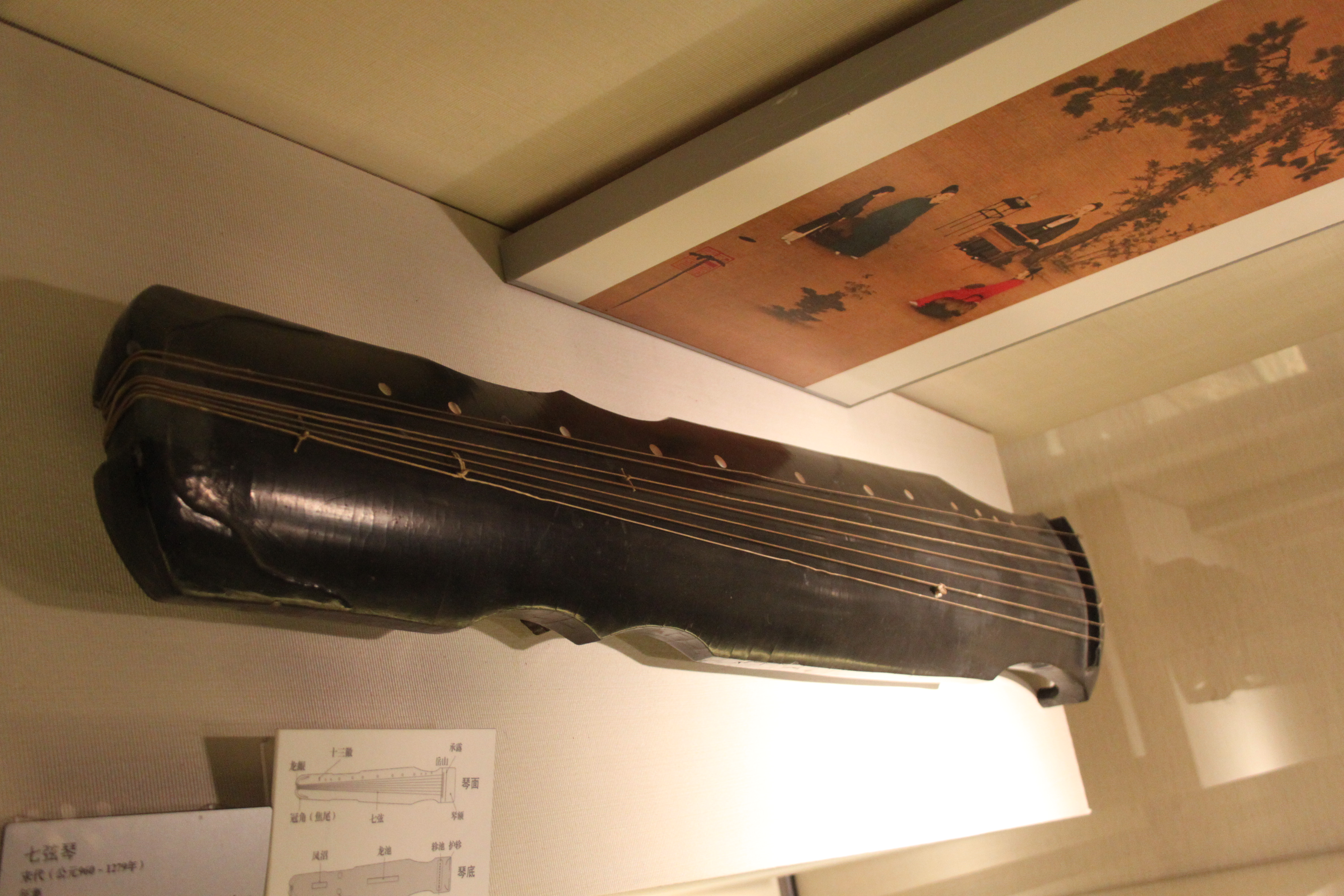
Qin Instrument

Traditionally instruments are inlaid with pearl, ivory or jade to mark the placement of key notes, in order to guide the player. Owing to its construction the Qin player is able to creates a large range of pitches and tambres. The production of these sounds through differing techniques such as string plucking, string stopping and harmonics hold great compositional significance as “in performance the qin symbolises the union of heaven, earth, and humankind”.

Historically northern schools of Qin technique vary from their southern counterparts in their more vigorous nature. The instrument was a staple of the Sizhu folk ensembles of the Ming and Qing dynasties.

A rock carving from Shanxi province dated between 386 and 534 a.d. Depicts a bodhisattva playing the Qin.

=== Liuqin ===
Liuqiin (also known as Liuyeqin) is a relative of the lute and is most commonly made from willow wood. The instrument built to resemble a willow leaf is widely used throughout Chinese music. Similar in construction to the Pipa, the Liuquin often accompanies Liuqin opera popular in the northern Jiangsu province. The instrument is played with a pick or plectrum by plucking the four silk strings.

A resurgence of popularity of the instrument through the 1950-1970s led to improvements in the instrument's tone quality through a change from silk to metal strings. Such changes increased the instrument's capabilities as a solo-instrument especially within contemporary folk-bands in which its tone is compared to that of a mandolin.

=== Guanzi ===
The Guanzi in Northern dialects or Guanzi in the South is a traditional double-reed instrument consisting of 7 finger holes and 1 thumb hole. The instrument is typically made of wood in China's north and bamboo in the nation's south, a reflection of differing regional flora. Between 18 –33 cm in length the instrument produces a nasal tone similar to the western oboe. A variation on the ancient ‘bili’ of the Tang and Song dynasties, the Guan often accompanies ancient Buddhist and Taoist music, but is also found throughout Chinese cultural music.

Due to its distinct tambre, the Guan is usually placed in the mid-section of traditional wind orchestras in a section consisting of two players. The northern Guanzi has two standard forms dedicated by the instruments pitch range, the lower alto and the higher soprano Guanzi both of which have a range of two and a half octaves when played with an overblowing technique.

Lady Danian Herding Donkey's is regarded as a notable piece within Guanzi repertoire, for its solo featuring of the wind instrument.

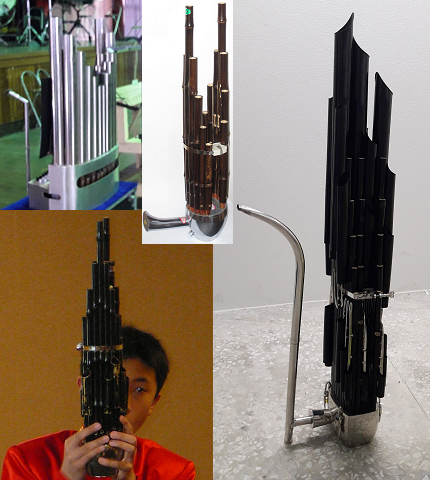
A collage of Sheng images

=== Sheng ===
Popular throughout China, the Sheng is noted for its prevalence in traditional music of the Quantao music of the Northern Hebei province. A polyphonic instrument consisting of 17 individual pipes, each of which house a single ‘free reed’.The musician blows into the mouthpiece of the sheng and covers the relevant finger holes to create sound, the pipesets based on the chromatic scale allow for huge pitch range and melodic diversity. Instruments similar to the sheng have been dated back to the Han dynasty of 206 BC - 220AD.

Transported to Russia in the 18th century, the unique free-reed structure of the Sheng inspired significant western cultural instruments such as the accordion, concertina and harmonica.
