= Shankar, Punjab =

Village in Punjab, India

Shankar Shankar
- Village
- Location in Punjab, India Shankar (India)
- Coordinates: 31.1467669°N 75.520749°E
- Country: India
- State: Punjab
- District: Jalandhar
- Founder: not known
- Talukas: Nakodar

Government
  - Type: Panchayati raj (India)
  - Body: Gram panchayat

Languages
  - Official: Punjabi
  - Regional: Punjabi
- Time zone: UTC+5:30 (IST)
- PIN: 144042
- Telephone code: 01821
- Nearest city: Nakodar

Shankar is a village in the Nakodar tehsil of Jalandhar district in Punjab, India.

== About ==
Shankar lies on the Nakodar-Phagwara Road. The nearest railway station to this village is Shankar Railway station about 2 km from the village. One of the oldest villages of the state of Punjab, the village has been the hometown of many scholars, politicians, army officers, engineers, doctors, prominent teachers, and journalists. S. Pratap Singh was the President of SGPC for three terms (1933–36). His son S. Swaran Singh has been the longest serving cabinet minister in India. He served as Minister for External Affairs, Railways, Defence, Food, Science and Technology in the ministries of Prime Ministers Jawaharlal Nehru, Lal Bahadur Shastri, and Indira Gandhi. S. Balbir Singh was the health minister of Punjab. From 2014-2017, S. Apinder Singh served as Chairman of The Nakodar Market Committee. His father, S. Jarnail Singh, was an Indian freedom fighter exiled by the British government to the Cellular Prison, located in the Andaman and Nicobar Islands. He was later awarded for his efforts with a Rashtrapati Award.

== Demographics ==
According to the 2011 Census of India, Shankar village had 1,186 households and a total population of 5,639, of which 2,900 were male and 2,739 were female. Children aged 0–6 numbered 538 (9.54% of the total population), with a child sex ratio of 842 girls per 1,000 boys, lower than the Punjab state average of 846.

The overall sex ratio of Shankar was 944 females per 1,000 males, higher than the state average of 895. The village’s literacy rate stood at 83.00%, exceeding the Punjab average of 75.84%; male literacy was 87.27%, while female literacy was 78.54%.

== Notable persons ==
- Swaran Singh is India's longest-serving union cabinet minister.
- Pratap Singh was the President of the SGPC
- Apinder Singh was the Chairman of The Nakodar Market Committee.
- Jarnail Singh was an Indian freedom fighter and recipient of a Rashtrapati Award.
