= Rajdeep Phogat =

Indian politician

Member of the Haryana Legislative Assembly
- In office 2014–2019
- Preceded by: Krishan Lal
- Succeeded by: Ranjit Singh Chautala
- Constituency: Dadri

Personal details
- Party: Jannayak Janta Party
- Other political affiliations: Indian National Lok Dal
- Education: Secondary school
- Profession: Politician

Rajdeep Phogat is an Indian politician. He was elected to the Haryana Legislative Assembly from Dadri in the 2014 election, as a member of the Indian National Lok Dal.

== Political career ==
Rajdeep Phogat is a politician from Haryana, India. He entered politics through the Indian National Lok Dal (INLD) and held various positions within the party. In the 2014 Haryana Legislative Assembly election, he contested from the Dadri constituency as an INLD candidate and won, defeating his closest rival, BJP candidate Somveer Sangwan, by a margin of 1,610 votes.

Before the 2019 assembly elections, following a split in the INLD, Phogat joined the newly formed Jannayak Janta Party (JJP) led by Dushyant Chautala. In 2020, he was appointed as the Chairman of the Haryana Housing Board. In the 2024 Haryana Legislative Assembly election, he contested as a JJP candidate but finished in fifth place.

He was one of the four MLAs who joined the Dushyant Chautala's Jannayak Janta Party after a split in Indian National Lok Dal.
