= Rattowal, Pakistan =

Pakistani village

Rattowal رتووال
- Village
- Location in Pakistan
- Coordinates: 32°28′N 73°30′E
- Country: Pakistan
- Region: Punjab
- District: Mandi Bahauddin
- Tehsil: Mandi Bahauddin

Area
  - Total: 8 km^{2} (3.1 sq mi)
- Elevation: 218 m (715 ft)

Population (2017)
  - Total: 8,000
- Time zone: UTC+5 (PST)
- Area code: 0456

Rattowal is a village of Mandi Bahauddin District of Punjab, Pakistan with a population of approximately 10,000 people. Situated in northern Punjab, the village lies between the cities of Mandi Bahauddin and Phalia - about 18 km (11 mi) from Mandi Bahauddin, 7 km (4.3 mi) from Phalia, 45 km (28 mi) from Malakwal and roughly 80 km (50 mi) from Salam interchange on M2 Motorway. Rattowal is located at an altitude of 218 m (715 ft) above sea level.

== Education ==
Government Islamia Millet High School for Boys, established in early 70s, is a famous progressive school in Madhray Rattowal. The village also hosts the Government High School for Girls. Two Government primary schools for boys and one Government primary school for Girls. There are also private schools in the village.

== Weather ==
This village has a moderate climate, it remains hot in summer and cold in winter. During peak summer, the temperature rises up to 44 °C (111 °F). The winter months are mild and the minimum temperature may fall below 0 °C (32 °F). The average annual rainfall in the district is 50 mm (2.0 in).

=== History ===
Rattowal was founded about 200 years ago by the Ranjha caste. But there are many other groups of people living in the village.
