= Leel =

- Village
- Interactive map of Leel
- Country: India
- State: Punjab
- District: Jalandhar

Languages
  - Official: Punjabi
- Time zone: UTC+5:30 (IST)

Leel is a village in Nakodar. Nakodar is a city in the district Jalandhar of Indian state of Punjab.

== About ==
Leel lies on the Nakodar-Phagwara road which is almost 3 km from it. The nearest railway station to Leel is Shankar railway station at a distance of 2 km.

== Post code ==
Leel's Post office is Shankar.
