= Gujjarwal =

- Village
- Location in Punjab, India Gujjarwal (India)
- Coordinates: 30.744011°N 75.7427501°E
- Country: India
- State: Punjab
- District: Ludhiana
- Tehsil: Ludhiana West

Government
  - Type: Panchayati raj (India)
  - Body: Gram panchayat

Languages
  - Official: Punjabi
  - Other spoken: Hindi
- Time zone: UTC+5:30 (IST)
- Telephone code: 0161
- ISO 3166 code: IN-PB
- Vehicle registration: PB-10
- Website: ludhiana.nic.in

Gujjarwal Ludhiana' is a village located in the Ludhiana West tehsil, of Ludhiana district, Punjab.

== Administration ==
The village is administrated by a Sarpanch who is an elected representative of village as per constitution of India and Panchayati raj (India).

Particulars	Total	Male	Female
Total No. of Houses	1,016		
Population	4,947	2,569	2,378

== Air travel connectivity ==
The closest airport to the village is Sahnewal Airport.

== Notable people ==
Dr. Neelam Grewal - Member Punjab Public Service Commission, Patiala. Former Dean, Post Graduate Studies, Punjab Agricultural University, Ludhiana and former director, Central Institute for Women in Agriculture, Bhubaneswar. Amarjit Singh Grewal - Director Of Jalandhar Doordarshan Kendra. LtCol Deepinder Singh Grewal US Airforce
