= 2023 World Wrestling Championships – Women's freestyle 57 kg =

Wrestling competitions

Women's freestyle 57 kg at the 2023 World Championships
- Venue: Štark Arena
- Dates: 19–20 September 2023
- Competitors: 36 from 33 nations

Medalists
gold medal	Tsugumi Sakurai	Japan
silver medal	Anastasia Nichita	Moldova
bronze medal	Odunayo Adekuoroye	Nigeria
bronze medal	Helen Maroulis	United States

The women's freestyle 57 kg is a competition featured at the 2023 World Wrestling Championships, and was held in Belgrade, Serbia on 19 and 20 September 2023.

This freestyle wrestling competition consists of a single-elimination tournament, with a repechage used to determine the winner of two bronze medals. The two finalists face off for gold and silver medals. Each wrestler who loses to one of the two finalists moves into the repechage, culminating in a pair of bronze medal matches featuring the semifinal losers each facing the remaining repechage opponent from their half of the bracket.

== Results ==
Legend

- F — Won by fall
- WO — Won by walkover

=== Finals ===
Semifinals		Final
Elvira Kamaloğlu (TUR)	0
Anastasia Nichita (MDA)	10	Anastasia Nichita (MDA)	2
Tsugumi Sakurai (JPN)	6	Tsugumi Sakurai (JPN)	3
Helen Maroulis (USA)	0

=== Top half ===
==== Section 1 ====
Round of 64
Elvira Kamaloğlu (TUR)	4
Hong Kexin (CHN)	4

Round of 32
Alina Hrushyna (UKR)
Bat-Ochiryn Bolortuyaa (MGL)	WO
Mathilde Rivière (FRA)	1
Ramóna Galambos (HUN)	4
Elvira Kamaloğlu (TUR)	10
Jacqueline Hernández (ESA)	0
Sandra Paruszewski (GER)	5
Luisa Valverde (ECU)	6

Round of 16
Bat-Ochiryn Bolortuyaa (MGL)	5
Ramóna Galambos (HUN)	7
Elvira Kamaloğlu (TUR)	11^{F}
Luisa Valverde (ECU)	2

Quarterfinals
Ramóna Galambos (HUN)	1
Elvira Kamaloğlu (TUR)	1

==== Section 2 ====
Round of 64
Evelina Nikolova (BUL)	10
Marija Ignjatović (SRB)	0

Round of 32
Laylokhon Sobirova (UZB)	1
Ainur Ashimova (KAZ)	1
Anastasia Nichita (MDA)	12^{F}
Evelina Nikolova (BUL)	0
Sarita Mor (UWW)	6
Betzabeth Sarco (VEN)	1
Odunayo Adekuoroye (NGR)	10
Giullia Penalber (BRA)	7

Round of 16
Laylokhon Sobirova (UZB)	2
Anastasia Nichita (MDA)	13
Sarita Mor (UWW)	4
Odunayo Adekuoroye (NGR)	6

Quarterfinals
Anastasia Nichita (MDA)	10
Odunayo Adekuoroye (NGR)	0

=== Bottom half ===
==== Section 3 ====
Round of 64
Kwon Young-jin (KOR)	3
Kalmira Bilimbek Kyzy (KGZ)	14

Round of 32
Tsugumi Sakurai (JPN)	10
Aurora Russo (ITA)	0
Olga Khoroshavtseva (AIN)	4
Iryna Kurachkina (AIN)	2^{F}
Kalmira Bilimbek Kyzy (KGZ)	2
Hannah Taylor (CAN)	4
Mary Naliaka (KEN)	0
Anhelina Lysak (POL)	2^{F}

Round of 16
Tsugumi Sakurai (JPN)	9
Iryna Kurachkina (AIN)	2
Hannah Taylor (CAN)	0
Anhelina Lysak (POL)	4^{F}

Quarterfinals
Tsugumi Sakurai (JPN)	7
Anhelina Lysak (POL)	0

==== Section 4 ====
Round of 64
Alma Valencia (MEX)	4^{F}
Rckaela Aquino (GUM)	2

Round of 32
Zhala Aliyeva (AZE)	7
Andrea González (COL)	2
Evelina Hulthén (SWE)	0
Alma Valencia (MEX)	11
Kateryna Zhydachevska (ROU)	1
Graciela Sánchez (ESP)	3
Nes Marie Rodríguez (PUR)	0
Helen Maroulis (USA)	10^{F}

Round of 16
Zhala Aliyeva (AZE)	8^{F}
Alma Valencia (MEX)	2
Graciela Sánchez (ESP)	0
Helen Maroulis (USA)	8^{F}

Quarterfinals
Zhala Aliyeva (AZE)	3
Helen Maroulis (USA)	8

=== Repechage ===
Repechage round 2
Evelina Nikolova (BUL)	8^{F}
Laylokhon Sobirova (UZB)	3
Aurora Russo (ITA)	0
Iryna Kurachkina (AIN)	11

Repechage round 3
Evelina Nikolova (BUL)	7
Odunayo Adekuoroye (NGR)	14^{F}
Iryna Kurachkina (AIN)	0
Anhelina Lysak (POL)	10

Bronze medals
Odunayo Adekuoroye (NGR)	9
Elvira Kamaloğlu (TUR)	5
Anhelina Lysak (POL)	6
Helen Maroulis (USA)	10

Olympic wrestle-off
Elvira Kamaloğlu (TUR)	4
Anhelina Lysak (POL)	8^{F}

== Final standing ==
Rank	Athlete
1st place, gold medalist(s)	Tsugumi Sakurai (JPN)
2nd place, silver medalist(s)	Anastasia Nichita (MDA)
3rd place, bronze medalist(s)	Odunayo Adekuoroye (NGR)
3rd place, bronze medalist(s)	Helen Maroulis (USA)
5	Anhelina Lysak (POL)
5	Elvira Kamaloğlu (TUR)
7	Iryna Kurachkina (AIN)
8	Evelina Nikolova (BUL)
9	Alma Valencia (MEX)
10	Zhala Aliyeva (AZE)
11	Ramóna Galambos (HUN)
12	Bat-Ochiryn Bolortuyaa (MGL)
13	Kalmira Bilimbek Kyzy (KGZ)
14	Sarita Mor (UWW)
15	Laylokhon Sobirova (UZB)
16	Luisa Valverde (ECU)
17	Hannah Taylor (CAN)
18	Graciela Sánchez (ESP)
19	Giullia Penalber (BRA)
20	Sandra Paruszewski (GER)
21	Hong Kexin (CHN)
22	Kwon Young-jin (KOR)
23	Andrea González (COL)
24	Ainur Ashimova (KAZ)
25	Kateryna Zhydachevska (ROU)
26	Mathilde Rivière (FRA)
27	Betzabeth Sarco (VEN)
28	Olga Khoroshavtseva (AIN)
29	Rckaela Aquino (GUM)
30	Alina Hrushyna (UKR)
31	Mary Naliaka (KEN)
32	Jacqueline Hernández (ESA)
33	Marija Ignjatović (SRB)
34	Nes Marie Rodríguez (PUR)
35	Evelina Hulthén (SWE)
36	Aurora Russo (ITA)

Qualified for the 2024 Summer Olympics
