= Grand Prix de France Henri Deglane 2024 – Women's freestyle =

The women's freestyle competitions at the Grand Prix de France Henri Deglane 2024 were held in Nice, France on 19 January 2024.

== Women's freestyle ==
=== Women's freestyle 50 kg ===
Round of 16
Erin Golston (USA)	4
Emma Luttenauer (FRA)	8
Svenja Jungo (SUI)	12
Jasmine Bouazeria (FRA)	0
Katie Dutchak (CAN)	2^{C}
Lola Jacquinot (FRA)	0
Abir Zarrouki (TUN)	0
Justine Vigouroux (FRA)	3
Natalia Walczak (POL)	0
Joséphine Haemmerle (FRA)	3^{F}
Georgiana Antuca (ROU)	0^{R}
Julie Sabatié (FRA)	9

Quarterfinals
Emma Luttenauer (FRA)	10
Svenja Jungo (SUI)	0
Katie Dutchak (CAN)	6^{F}
Joanna Samsonowicz (POL)	0
Justine Vigouroux (FRA)	2
Joséphine Haemmerle (FRA)	3
Julie Sabatié (FRA)	6
Amanda Tomczyk (POL)	0

Semifinals
Emma Luttenauer (FRA)	4
Katie Dutchak (CAN)	11
JJoséphine Haemmerle (FRA)	4
Julie Sabatié (FRA)	9

Final
Katie Dutchak (CAN)	4
Julie Sabatié (FRA)	2

Repechage 1 of 4
Erin Golston (USA)	11^{F}
Jasmine Bouazeria (FRA)	0
Abir Zarrouki (TUN)	0
Natalia Walczak (POL)	10

Repechage 2 of 4
Erin Golston (USA)	3
Amanda Tomczyk (POL)	1
Lola Jacquinot (FRA)	0
Justine Vigouroux (FRA)	10
Natalia Walczak (POL)	11^{F}
Joanna Samsonowicz (POL)	0
Georgiana Antuca (ROU)
Svenja Jungo (SUI)	WO

Repechage 3 of 4
Erin Golston (USA)	10
Justine Vigouroux (FRA)	3
Natalia Walczak (POL)	7
Svenja Jungo (SUI)	12^{F}

Bronze medals
Erin Golston (USA)	0
Emma Luttenauer (FRA)	8
Svenja Jungo (SUI)	0
Joséphine Haemmerle (FRA)	10

=== Women's freestyle 53 kg ===
Round of 16
Christianah Ogunsanya (NGR)	10
Tetiana Profatilova (FRA)	3
Alisha Howk (USA)	1
Samantha Stewart (CAN)	1
Katie Gomez (USA)	10
Maëlyss Rousselet (FRA)	0
Victoria Báez (ESP)	4^{F}
Florentina Rotaru (ROU)	0
Lobna Ichaoui (TUN)	3
Lilya Cohen (FRA)	3
Hannah Hall (USA)	1
Elena Ionescu (ROU)	3
Lauren Mason (USA)	0
Jonna Malmgren (SWE)	10

Quarterfinals
Christianah Ogunsanya (NGR)	10
Alisha Howk (USA)	0
Katie Gomez (USA)	9
Victoria Báez (ESP)	1
Lilya Cohen (FRA)	5
Elena Ionescu (ROU)	0
Jonna Malmgren (SWE)	4^{F}
Aintzane Gorría (ESP)	0

Semifinals
Christianah Ogunsanya (NGR)	1
Katie Gomez (USA)	12
Lilya Cohen (FRA)	0
Jonna Malmgren (SWE)	6^{F}

Final
Katie Gomez (USA)	5
Jonna Malmgren (SWE)	6^{F}

Repechage 1 of 4
Tetiana Profatilova (FRA)	4
Samantha Stewart (CAN)	2
Maëlyss Rousselet (FRA)	8
Florentina Rotaru (ROU)	2
Lobna Ichaoui (TUN)	12
Hannah Hall (USA)	3

Repechage 2 of 4
Tetiana Profatilova (FRA)	10
Aintzane Gorría (ESP)	0
Maëlyss Rousselet (FRA)	0
Elena Ionescu (ROU)	10
Lobna Ichaoui (TUN)	0
Victoria Báez (ESP)	10
Lauren Mason (USA)	1
Alisha Howk (USA)	7

Repechage 3 of 4
Tetiana Profatilova (FRA)	11
Elena Ionescu (ROU)	0
Victoria Báez (ESP)	3
Alisha Howk (USA)	2

Bronze medals
Tetiana Profatilova (FRA)	0
Christianah Ogunsanya (NGR)	4
Victoria Báez (ESP)	10
Lilya Cohen (FRA)	0

=== Women's freestyle 57 kg ===
Round of 32
	Score	
~~Kelsey Barnes (GBR)~~	WO	Ana Maria Puiu (ROU)
Abigail Nette (USA)	WO	~~Johanna Lindborg (SWE)~~
Hannah Taylor (CAN)	9–1 Fall	Evelina Hulthén (SWE)
Patrycja Strzelczyk (POL)	WO	~~Tilda Näslund (SWE)~~

Round of 16
Ana Maria Puiu (ROU)	3
Graciela Sánchez (ESP)	4
Julia Nowicka (POL)	2
Mia Olivier (FRA)	3
Abigail Nette (USA)	3
Amel Rebiha (FRA)	4
Giullia Penalber (BRA)	7
Romaïssa El Kharroubi (FRA)	0
Hannah Taylor (CAN)	8
Mathilde Rivière (FRA)	0
Aleksandra Witos (POL)	8
Gaëlle Ruiz (FRA)	4
Patrycja Strzelczyk (POL)	0
Céleste Sion (FRA)	2
Ester Abraham (NAM)	3
Faten Hammami (TUN)	10

Quarterfinals
Graciela Sánchez (ESP)	4
Mia Olivier (FRA)	1
Amel Rebiha (FRA)	0
Giullia Penalber (BRA)	4^{F}
Hannah Taylor (CAN)	13^{F}
Aleksandra Witos (POL)	1
Céleste Sion (FRA)	6
Faten Hammami (TUN)	5

Semifinals
Graciela Sánchez (ESP)	0
Giullia Penalber (BRA)	5^{F}
Hannah Taylor (CAN)	11
Céleste Sion (FRA)	0

Final
Giullia Penalber (BRA)	5
Hannah Taylor (CAN)	2

Repechage 2 of 6
~~Kelsey Barnes (GBR)~~
Ester Abraham (NAM)	WO
~~Johanna Lindborg (SWE)~~
Gaëlle Ruiz (FRA)	WO
Evelina Hulthén (SWE)	8
Romaïssa El Kharroubi (FRA)	3
~~Tilda Näslund (SWE)~~
Julia Nowicka (POL)	WO

Repechage 3 of 6
Ester Abraham (NAM)	0
Patrycja Strzelczyk (POL)	10
Gaëlle Ruiz (FRA)	0
Mathilde Rivière (FRA)	10
Evelina Hulthén (SWE)	0
Abigail Nette (USA)	6
Julia Nowicka (POL)	2
Ana Maria Puiu (ROU)	14

Repechage 4 of 6
Patrycja Strzelczyk (POL)	1
Mia Olivier (FRA)	4
Mathilde Rivière (FRA)	2^{F}
Amel Rebiha (FRA)	2
Abigail Nette (USA)	11
Aleksandra Witos (POL)	0
Ana Maria Puiu (ROU)	8^{F}
Faten Hammami (TUN)	0

Repechage 5 of 6
Mia Olivier (FRA)	0
Mathilde Rivière (FRA)	12
Abigail Nette (USA)	5
Ana Maria Puiu (ROU)	0

Bronze medals
Mathilde Rivière (FRA)	8
Céleste Sion (FRA)	0
Abigail Nette (USA)	11
Graciela Sánchez (ESP)	0

=== Women's freestyle 62 kg ===
Round of 16
Lydia Pérez (ESP)	WO
~~Skylar Hattendorf (USA)~~
Annatina Lippuner (SUI)	6
Lauren Louive (USA)	12^{F}
Siwar Bousetta (TUN)	4
Lexie Basham (USA)	0
Laís Nunes (BRA)	7
Ana Luciano (USA)	0
Mathilde Guédon (FRA)	0
Johanna Lindborg (SWE)	10
Esther Kolawole (NGR)	10
Bridgette Duty (USA)	0

Quarterfinals
Lydia Pérez (ESP)	2
Lauren Louive (USA)	7
Siwar Bousetta (TUN)	6
Nicola Wasilewska (POL)	2
Laís Nunes (BRA)	WO
Johanna Lindborg (SWE)
Esther Kolawole (NGR)	13^{F}
Olha Padoshyk (POL)	4

Semifinals
Lauren Louive (USA)	3
Siwar Bousetta (TUN)	8
Laís Nunes (BRA)	8
Esther Kolawole (NGR)	7

Final
Siwar Bousetta (TUN)	0
Laís Nunes (BRA)	11

Repechage 1 of 4
~~Skylar Hattendorf (USA)~~
Annatina Lippuner (SUI)	WO
Ana Luciano (USA)	6^{F}
Mathilde Guédon (FRA)	0

Repechage 2 of 4
Annatina Lippuner (SUI)	10
Olha Padoshyk (POL)	0
Lexie Basham (USA)	WO
Johanna Lindborg (SWE)
Ana Luciano (USA)	6^{F}
Nicola Wasilewska (POL)	0
Bridgette Duty (USA)	3
Lydia Pérez (ESP)	6

Repechage 3 of 4
Annatina Lippuner (SUI)	0
Lexie Basham (USA)	7^{F}
Ana Luciano (USA)	3
Lydia Pérez (ESP)	4

Bronze medals
Lexie Basham (USA)	5
Lauren Louive (USA)	0
Lydia Pérez (ESP)	2
Esther Kolawole (NGR)	12

=== Women's freestyle 65 kg ===
Pos	Athlete	Pld	W	L	CP	TP	FRA	POL	LAT	CAN
1	Iris Thiébaux (FRA)	3	3	0	9	21	—	6–3	6–0	9–0
2	Alicja Nowosad (POL)	3	2	1	7	12	1–3 PO1	—	6–0	3–1
3	Elma Zeidlere (LAT)	3	1	2	3	5	0–3 PO	0–3 PO	—	5–1
4	Madison Clayton (CAN)	3	0	3	2	2	0–3 PO	1–3 PO1	1–3 PO1	—

Source: UWW

=== Women's freestyle 68 kg ===
Quarterfinals		Semifinals		Final
Paulina Danisz (POL)	4
Dalma Caneva (ITA)	0	Paulina Danisz (POL)	1
Kaylynn Albrecht (USA)	10	Kaylynn Albrecht (USA)	3
Nerea Pampín (ESP)	0			Kaylynn Albrecht (USA)	10
Nour Jeljeli (TUN)	4			Georgiana Andrieș (ROU)	0
Lorena Lera (ESP)	2	Nour Jeljeli (TUN)	0
Georgiana Andrieș (ROU)	WO	Georgiana Andrieș (ROU)	4^{F}
~~Elvira Braun (SWE)~~

Repechage 1 of 2
Dalma Caneva (ITA)
Nerea Pampín (ESP)	WO
Lorena Lera (ESP)	WO
~~Elvira Braun (SWE)~~

Bronze medals
Nerea Pampín (ESP)	2
Nour Jeljeli (TUN)	7
Lorena Lera (ESP)	1
Paulina Danisz (POL)	1

=== Women's freestyle 72 kg ===
Pos	Athlete	Pld	W	L	CP	TP	BRA	ROU	FRA
1	Thamires Machado (BRA)	2	2	0	9	20	—	10–1 Fall	10–0
2	Larisa Niţu (ROU)	2	1	1	4	11	0–5 FA	—	10–0
3	Ambre Chevreau (FRA)	2	0	2	0	0	0–4 SU	0–4 SU	—

Source: UWW

Pos	Athlete	Pld	W	L	CP	TP	FRA	POL	ROU
1	Kendra Dacher (FRA)	2	2	0	8	24	—	10–0	14–4
2	Karolina Jaworska (POL)	2	1	1	5	7	0–4 SU	—	7–4 Fall
3	Paula Rotaru (ROU)	2	0	2	1	8	1–4 SU1	0–5 FA	—

Source: UWW

Semifinals
Thamires Machado (BRA)	10
Karolina Jaworska (POL)	0
Larisa Niţu (ROU)	2
Kendra Dacher (FRA)	12

Final
Thamires Machado (BRA)	2^{F}
Kendra Dacher (FRA)	0
Third place
Karolina Jaworska (POL)	1
Larisa Niţu (ROU)	6^{F}

=== Women's freestyle 76 kg ===
Round of 16
Patrycja Cuber (POL)	0
Precious Bell (USA)	7^{F}
Meiriele Hora (BRA)	7
Pauline Lecarpentier (FRA)	3
Daniela Tkachuk (POL)	4
Yelena Makoyed (USA)	4^{F}
Skylar Grote (USA)	12
Elvira Braun (SWE)	1

Quarterfinals
Precious Bell (USA)	14
Zaineb Sghaier (TUN)	4
Meiriele Hora (BRA)	1
Brooklyn Hays (USA)	6
Yelena Makoyed (USA)	7
Dymond Guilford (USA)	4
Epp Mäe (EST)	0
Skylar Grote (USA)	11

Semifinals
Zaineb Sghaier (TUN)	12
Brooklyn Hays (USA)	0
Yelena Makoyed (USA)	11
Skylar Grote (USA)	1

Final
Zaineb Sghaier (TUN)	8
Yelena Makoyed (USA)	15^{F}

Repechage 2 of 4
Patrycja Cuber (POL)	4
Epp Mäe (EST)	4
Pauline Lecarpentier (FRA)	1^{DSQ}
Dymond Guilford (USA)	7
Daniela Tkachuk (POL)	8^{F}
Meiriele Hora (BRA)	7
Elvira Braun (SWE)	0
Precious Bell (USA)	12^{F}

Repechage 3 of 4
Patrycja Cuber (POL)	1
Dymond Guilford (USA)	12
Daniela Tkachuk (POL)	6^{F}
Precious Bell (USA)	8

Bronze medals
Dymond Guilford (USA)	6
Brooklyn Hays (USA)	2
Daniela Tkachuk (POL)	0
Skylar Grote (USA)	10

== See also ==
- Grand Prix de France Henri Deglane 2024
