= Grand Prix de France Henri Deglane 2024 =

Henri Deglane Grand Prix 2024
- Host city: Nice, France
- Dates: 19–21 January 2024
- Stadium: Salle Serge Leyrit

Champions
- Freestyle: United States
- Greco-Roman: Georgia
- Women: United States

The L Grand Prix de France Henri Deglane 2024 (also known as Grand Prix of France 2024 and Henri Deglane Grand Prix 2024) was a wrestling event held in Nice, France. It is held in the memory of 1924 Olympic Gold medalist Henri Deglane.

== Medal table ==
* Host nation (France)

Rank	Nation	Gold	Silver	Bronze	Total
1	Georgia	8	7	7	22
2	United States	6	5	7	18
3	France*	4	4	6	14
4	Brazil	3	0	0	3
5	Germany	1	2	2	5
6	Canada	1	1	1	3
6	Denmark	1	1	1	3
6	Spain	1	1	1	3
9	Greece	1	0	0	1
9	Mexico	1	0	0	1
9	Sweden	1	0	0	1
12	Tunisia	0	2	2	4
13	Poland	0	1	3	4
14	Kazakhstan	0	1	2	3
14	Romania	0	1	2	3
16	Bulgaria	0	1	1	2
17	Argentina	0	1	0	1
18	Nigeria	0	0	2	2
18	Puerto Rico	0	0	2	2
20	Austria	0	0	1	1
20	Finland	0	0	1	1
20	Guinea-Bissau	0	0	1	1
20	Israel	0	0	1	1
20	Latvia	0	0	1	1
20	Switzerland	0	0	1	1
20	United World Wrestling	0	0	1	1
Totals (26 entries)		28	28	46	102

== Team ranking ==
Rank	Men's freestyle		Men's Greco-Roman		Women's freestyle	
Rank	Team	Points	Team	Points	Team	Points
1	United States	271	Georgia	483	United States	192
2	Germany	177	France	146	France	182
3	France	140	Poland	111	Poland	100
4	Kazakhstan	115	Denmark	68	Brazil	79
5	Bulgaria	77	Switzerland	53	Romania	65
6	Spain	57	Finland	31	Tunisia	63
7	Poland	51	Tunisia	31	Canada	60
8	Puerto Rico	50	Israel	29	Spain	59
9	Romania	31	Argentina	20	Sweden	41
10	Austria	29	Spain	14	Nigeria	30

== Medal overview ==
=== Men's freestyle ===
Event	Gold	Silver	Bronze
57 kg	Roman Bravo-Young; Mexico	Daniel DeShazer; United States	Ivaylo Tisov; Bulgaria
57 kg	Roman Bravo-Young; Mexico	Daniel DeShazer; United States	Diamantino Iuna Fafé; Guinea-Bissau
61 kg	Arman Eloyan; France	Georgi Vangelov; Bulgaria	Joey Silva; Puerto Rico
61 kg	Arman Eloyan; France	Georgi Vangelov; Bulgaria	Ravi Kumar Dahiya; United World Wrestling
65 kg	Aden Valencia; United States	Khamzat Arsamerzouev; France	Peiman Biabani; Canada
65 kg	Aden Valencia; United States	Khamzat Arsamerzouev; France	Ștefan Coman; Romania
70 kg	Seyfulla Itaev; France	Alexander Semisorow; Germany	Rifat Saibotalov; Kazakhstan
70 kg	Seyfulla Itaev; France	Alexander Semisorow; Germany	Marc Dietsche; Switzerland
74 kg	Mohammad Mottaghinia; Spain	Stas David Wolf; Germany	Tyler Berger; United States
74 kg	Mohammad Mottaghinia; Spain	Stas David Wolf; Germany	Alex Facundo; United States
79 kg	Pouria Taherkhani; Germany	Gabriel Iglesias; Spain	Adam Kakhriev; France
79 kg	Pouria Taherkhani; Germany	Gabriel Iglesias; Spain	Yerkhan Bexultanov; Kazakhstan
86 kg	Dauren Kurugliev; Greece	Mark Hall; United States	Taylor Lujan; United States
86 kg	Dauren Kurugliev; Greece	Mark Hall; United States	Joshua Morodion; Germany
92 kg	Camden McDanel; United States	Abdimanap Baigenzheyev; Kazakhstan	Michał Bielawski; Poland
92 kg	Camden McDanel; United States	Abdimanap Baigenzheyev; Kazakhstan	Benjamin Greil; Austria
97 kg	Michael Macchiavello; United States	Nathan Jackson; United States	Adlan Viskhanov; France
97 kg	Michael Macchiavello; United States	Nathan Jackson; United States	Ertuğrul Ağca; Germany
125 kg	Hayden Zillmer; United States	Trent Hillger; United States	Jonovan Smith; Puerto Rico

=== Men's Greco-Roman ===
Event	Gold	Silver	Bronze
55 kg	Giorgi Tokhadze; Georgia	Ramaz Silagava; Georgia	Giorgi Kochalidze; Georgia
60 kg	Romeo Beridze; Georgia	Nikolai Mohammadi; Denmark	Dimitri Khachidze; Georgia
60 kg	Romeo Beridze; Georgia	Nikolai Mohammadi; Denmark	Melkamu Fetene; Israel
63 kg	Rati Khozrevanidze; Georgia	Beka Guruli; Georgia	Anri Khozrevanidze; Georgia
67 kg	Tigran Galustyan; France	Nika Broladze; Georgia	Giorgi Shotadze; Georgia
67 kg	Tigran Galustyan; France	Nika Broladze; Georgia	Souleymen Nasr; Tunisia
72 kg	Giorgi Chkhikvadze; Georgia	Otar Abuladze; Georgia	Matias Lipasti; Finland
77 kg	Oliver Krüger; Denmark	Arsen Julfalakyan; Argentina	Khvicha Ananidze; Georgia
77 kg	Oliver Krüger; Denmark	Arsen Julfalakyan; Argentina	Tornike Mikeladze; Georgia
82 kg	Gela Bolkvadze; Georgia	Vladimeri Karchaidze; France	Brandon Guiadem Kamdem; France
87 kg	Gurami Khetsuriani; Georgia	Lasha Gobadze; Georgia	Aivengo Rikadze; Georgia
87 kg	Gurami Khetsuriani; Georgia	Lasha Gobadze; Georgia	Turpal Bisultanov; Denmark
97 kg	Robert Kobliashvili; Georgia	Giorgi Melia; Georgia	Artsiom Shumski; Poland
130 kg	Saba Chilashvili; Georgia	Giorgi Tsopurashvili; Georgia	None awarded as there were only 2 competitors.

=== Women's freestyle ===
Event	Gold	Silver	Bronze
50 kg	Katie Dutchak; Canada	Julie Sabatié; France	Emma Luttenauer; France
50 kg	Katie Dutchak; Canada	Julie Sabatié; France	Joséphine Haemmerle; France
53 kg	Jonna Malmgren; Sweden	Katie Gomez; United States	Christianah Ogunsanya; Nigeria
53 kg	Jonna Malmgren; Sweden	Katie Gomez; United States	Victoria Báez; Spain
55 kg	no competitors		
57 kg	Giullia Penalber; Brazil	Hannah Taylor; Canada	Mathilde Rivière; France
57 kg	Giullia Penalber; Brazil	Hannah Taylor; Canada	Abigail Nette; United States
59 kg	no competitors		
62 kg	Laís Nunes; Brazil	Siwar Bousetta; Tunisia	Esther Kolawole; Nigeria
62 kg	Laís Nunes; Brazil	Siwar Bousetta; Tunisia	Lexie Basham; United States
65 kg	Iris Thiébaux; France	Alicja Nowosad; Poland	Elma Zeidlere; Latvia
68 kg	Kaylynn Albrecht; United States	Georgiana Andrieș; Romania	Paulina Danisz; Poland
68 kg	Kaylynn Albrecht; United States	Georgiana Andrieș; Romania	Nour Jeljeli; Tunisia
72 kg	Thamires Machado; Brazil	Kendra Dacher; France	Larisa Niţu; Romania
76 kg	Yelena Makoyed; United States	Zaineb Sghaier; Tunisia	Dymond Guilford; United States
76 kg	Yelena Makoyed; United States	Zaineb Sghaier; Tunisia	Skylar Grote; United States

== Results ==
=== Men's freestyle ===
==== Men's freestyle 57 kg ====
Round of 16
Ben Hachem Tarik (MAR)	0
Roman Bravo-Young (MEX)	10
Diamantino Iuna Fafé (GBS)	WO
Ilman Mukhtarov (FRA)
Darian Cruz (PUR)	7
Ivaylo Tisov (BUL)	0
Cael Nasdeo (USA)	6^{F}
Răzvan Kovacs (ROU)	0

Quarterfinals
Roman Bravo-Young (MEX)	14
Kael Lauridsen (USA)	4
Diamantino Iuna Fafé (GBS)	10
Rafał Szewc (POL)	0
Darian Cruz (PUR)	0
Daniel DeShazer (USA)	10
Cael Nasdeo (USA)	10
Gary Giordmaina (MLT)	0

Semifinals
Roman Bravo-Young (MEX)	5^{F}
Diamantino Iuna Fafé (GBS)	0
Daniel DeShazer (USA)	10
Cael Nasdeo (USA)	0

Final
Roman Bravo-Young (MEX)	2
Daniel DeShazer (USA)	1

Repechage 2 of 4
Ben Hachem Tarik (MAR)	7
Gary Giordmaina (MLT)	1
Ilman Mukhtarov (FRA)
Darian Cruz (PUR)	WO
Ivaylo Tisov (BUL)	11^{F}
Rafał Szewc (POL)	4
Răzvan Kovacs (ROU)
Kael Lauridsen (USA)	WO

Repechage 3 of 4
Ben Hachem Tarik (MAR)	1
Darian Cruz (PUR)	2
Ivaylo Tisov (BUL)	14
Kael Lauridsen (USA)	11

Bronze medals
Darian Cruz (PUR)	2
Diamantino Iuna Fafé (GBS)	2
Ivaylo Tisov (BUL)	17
Cael Nasdeo (USA)	10

==== Men's freestyle 61 kg ====
Round of 16
Dario Dittrich (GER)	0
Georgi Vangelov (BUL)	10
Kairat Amirtayev (KAZ)	12
Jules Gardette (FRA)	1
Ramzan Awtaew (GER)	6
Joey Silva (PUR)	8
Julien Zinser (GER)	2
Ravi Kumar Dahiya (UWW)	13
Zangar Kabylbekov (KAZ)	9
Ramon Salazar (USA)	6
Jannis Rebholz (GER)	6
Arman Eloyan (FRA)	6

Quarterfinals
Georgi Vangelov (BUL)	5
Kairat Amirtayev (KAZ)	0
Joey Silva (PUR)	6
Levan Metreveli (ESP)	4
Ravi Kumar Dahiya (UWW)	12
Zangar Kabylbekov (KAZ)	6
Arman Eloyan (FRA)	6
Stilyan Iliev (BUL)	0

Semifinals
Georgi Vangelov (BUL)	7
Joey Silva (PUR)	2
Ravi Kumar Dahiya (UWW)	3
Arman Eloyan (FRA)	6

Final
Georgi Vangelov (BUL)	5
Arman Eloyan (FRA)	8

Repechage 1 of 4
Dario Dittrich (GER)	14
Jules Gardette (FRA)	4
Julien Zinser (GER)	6
Ramon Salazar (USA)	2

Repechage 2 of 4
Dario Dittrich (GER)	7
Stilyan Iliev (BUL)	2
~~Ramzan Awtaew (GER)~~	8^{DSQ}
Zangar Kabylbekov (KAZ)	8
Julien Zinser (GER)	3
Levan Metreveli (ESP)	4
Jannis Rebholz (GER)	4
Kairat Amirtayev (KAZ)	4

Repechage 3 of 4
Dario Dittrich (GER)	8
Zangar Kabylbekov (KAZ)	6
Levan Metreveli (ESP)	1
Kairat Amirtayev (KAZ)	2

Bronze medals
Dario Dittrich (GER)	0
Joey Silva (PUR)	10
Kairat Amirtayev (KAZ)	4
Ravi Kumar Dahiya (UWW)	10^{C}

==== Men's freestyle 65 kg ====
Round of 32
	Score	
Dominik Jagusz (POL)	2–12	Quentin Sticker (FRA)
Aden Valencia (USA)	14–4	Marwane Yezza (FRA)
Nino Leutert (SUI)	0–11	Khamzat Arsamerzouev (FRA)
Anthony Ashnault (USA)	4–9	Mikyay Naim (BUL)

Round of 16
Quentin Sticker (FRA)	0
Peiman Biabani (CAN)	8
Nahshon Garrett (USA)	6
Ștefan Coman (ROU)	8
Aden Valencia (USA)	11
Nico Megerle (GER)	0
Ilyas Abdurashidov (BEL)	4
Benjamin Boejthe (ROU)	14
Khamzat Arsamerzouev (FRA)	10
Mike Zale (CAN)	0
Matthew Kolodzik (USA)	11
Marian Sandu (ROU)	1
Mikyay Naim (BUL)	10
Leon Gerstenberger (GER)	6
Ayub Musaev (BEL)	11
Carlos Álvarez (ESP)	3

Quarterfinals
Peiman Biabani (CAN)	4
Ștefan Coman (ROU)	2
Aden Valencia (USA)	12
Benjamin Boejthe (ROU)	2
Khamzat Arsamerzouev (FRA)	3
Matthew Kolodzik (USA)	3
Mikyay Naim (BUL)	12
Ayub Musaev (BEL)	10

Semifinals
Peiman Biabani (CAN)	3
Aden Valencia (USA)	5
Khamzat Arsamerzouev (FRA)	9
Mikyay Naim (BUL)	3

Final
Aden Valencia (USA)	3
Khamzat Arsamerzouev (FRA)	2

Repechage 2 of 6
Dominik Jagusz (POL)	2
Carlos Álvarez (ESP)	12
Marwane Yezza (FRA)	12
Marian Sandu (ROU)	6
Nino Leutert (SUI)	11
Ilyas Abdurashidov (BEL)	5
Anthony Ashnault (USA)	12
Nahshon Garrett (USA)	13

Repechage 3 of 6
Carlos Álvarez (ESP)	WO
Leon Gerstenberger (GER)
Marwane Yezza (FRA)	10
Mike Zale (CAN)	0
Nino Leutert (SUI)	1
Nico Megerle (GER)	1
Nahshon Garrett (USA)	9
Quentin Sticker (FRA)	8

Repechage 4 of 6
Carlos Álvarez (ESP)	9
Ștefan Coman (ROU)	12
Marwane Yezza (FRA)	7
Benjamin Boejthe (ROU)	14
Nico Megerle (GER)	0
Matthew Kolodzik (USA)	11
Nahshon Garrett (USA)	3
Ayub Musaev (BEL)	7

Repechage 5 of 6
Ștefan Coman (ROU)	10
Benjamin Boejthe (ROU)	6
Matthew Kolodzik (USA)	11
Ayub Musaev (BEL)	0

Bronze medals
Ștefan Coman (ROU)	6
Mikyay Naim (BUL)	4
Matthew Kolodzik (USA)	5
Peiman Biabani (CAN)	6

==== Men's freestyle 70 kg ====
Round of 32
	Score	
Yernur Nurgazy (KAZ)	0–7	Yahya Thomas (USA)
Dias Sagdatov (KAZ)	5–0	Kaloyan Atanasov (BUL)

Round of 16
Yahya Thomas (USA)	10
Muhammad Abdurachmanov (BEL)	0
Rifat Saibotalov (KAZ)	6
Benedikt Huber (AUT)	1
Zhassulan Bexultanov (KAZ)	0
Kevin Henkel (GER)	10
Seyfulla Itaev (FRA)	10
Tony Tolbert (USA)	0
Dias Sagdatov (KAZ)	2
Alexander Semisorow (GER)	14
Abdoul-Malek Nakaev (FRA)	14
Fabian Niedźwiedzki (POL)	4
Timur Shanbayev (KAZ)	0
Marc Dietsche (SUI)	10
Moukhammad Sangariev (FRA)	6
Anwar Alli (USA)	2

Quarterfinals
Yahya Thomas (USA)	2
Rifat Saibotalov (KAZ)	2
Kevin Henkel (GER)	2
Seyfulla Itaev (FRA)	10
Alexander Semisorow (GER)	14
Abdoul-Malek Nakaev (FRA)	7
Marc Dietsche (SUI)	3
Moukhammad Sangariev (FRA)	2

Semifinals
Rifat Saibotalov (KAZ)	2
Seyfulla Itaev (FRA)	5
Alexander Semisorow (GER)	4
Marc Dietsche (SUI)	1

Final
Seyfulla Itaev (FRA)	10
Alexander Semisorow (GER)	0

Repechage 2 of 6
Yernur Nurgazy (KAZ)	10
Anwar Alli (USA)	0
Kaloyan Atanasov (BUL)	10
Tony Tolbert (USA)	0

Repechage 3 of 6
Yernur Nurgazy (KAZ)	11
Timur Shanbayev (KAZ)	0
Fabian Niedźwiedzki (POL)	0
Dias Sagdatov (KAZ)	9^{F}
Kaloyan Atanasov (BUL)	5
Zhassulan Bexultanov (KAZ)	3
Benedikt Huber (AUT)	0
Muhammad Abdurachmanov (BEL)	10

Repechage 4 of 6
Yernur Nurgazy (KAZ)	3
Yahya Thomas (USA)	3
Dias Sagdatov (KAZ)	8
Kevin Henkel (GER)	8
Kaloyan Atanasov (BUL)	8^{F}
Abdoul-Malek Nakaev (FRA)	2
Muhammad Abdurachmanov (BEL)	0
Rasul Altemirov (FRA)	10

Repechage 5 of 6
Yernur Nurgazy (KAZ)	3
Dias Sagdatov (KAZ)	2
Kaloyan Atanasov (BUL)	12^{F}
Moukhammad Sangariev (FRA)	2

Bronze medals
Yernur Nurgazy (KAZ)	2
Marc Dietsche (SUI)	5
Kaloyan Atanasov (BUL)	4
Rifat Saibotalov (KAZ)	5

==== Men's freestyle 74 kg ====
Round of 16
Tyler Berger (USA)	10
Nico Zarb (MLT)	0
Roni Nevalainen (FIN)	2
Shamil Ustaev (GER)	13
Joey Lavallee (USA)	3
Mohammad Mottaghinia (ESP)	3
Marian Subțirică (ROU)	0
Alan Golmohammadi (GER)	10
Alex Facundo (USA)	4
Mihail Georgiev (BUL)	2
Szymon Wojtkowski (POL)	1
Stefan Käppeler (GER)	4
Khairiddine Ben Tlili (TUN)	8^{F}
Magamed Deliev (FRA)	11
Rayanne Essaidi (MAR)	1
Stas David Wolf (GER)	11

Quarterfinals
Tyler Berger (USA)	4
Shamil Ustaev (GER)	2
Mohammad Mottaghinia (ESP)	10
Alan Golmohammadi (GER)	0
Alex Facundo (USA)	11
Stefan Käppeler (GER)	1
Khairiddine Ben Tlili (TUN)	0
Stas David Wolf (GER)	10

Semifinals
Tyler Berger (USA)	0
Mohammad Mottaghinia (ESP)	10
Alex Facundo (USA)	4
Stas David Wolf (GER)	5

Final
Mohammad Mottaghinia (ESP)	8
Stas David Wolf (GER)	1

Repechage 1 of 4
Nico Zarb (MLT)	4
Roni Nevalainen (FIN)	14
Joey Lavallee (USA)	14
Marian Subțirică (ROU)	1
Mihail Georgiev (BUL)	3
Szymon Wojtkowski (POL)	0
Magamed Deliev (FRA)
Rayanne Essaidi (MAR)	WO

Repechage 2 of 4
Roni Nevalainen (FIN)	1
Khairiddine Ben Tlili (TUN)	4^{F}
Joey Lavallee (USA)	4^{F}
Stefan Käppeler (GER)	0
Mihail Georgiev (BUL)	4
Alan Golmohammadi (GER)	1
Rayanne Essaidi (MAR)	2
Shamil Ustaev (GER)	6

Repechage 3 of 4
Khairiddine Ben Tlili (TUN)	0
Joey Lavallee (USA)	11
Mihail Georgiev (BUL)	1
Shamil Ustaev (GER)	1

Bronze medals
Joey Lavallee (USA)	6
Tyler Berger (USA)	8
Shamil Ustaev (GER)	1
Alex Facundo (USA)	10^{F}

==== Men's freestyle 79 kg ====
Round of 16
Umar Mavlaev (SUI)	7
Mateusz Pędzicki (POL)	6
Gabriel Iglesias (ESP)	6
Lukas Lins (AUT)	0

Quarterfinals
Umar Mavlaev (SUI)	3
Saifedine Alekma (FRA)	9
Pouria Taherkhani (GER)	10
Yerkhan Bexultanov (KAZ)	0
Gabriel Iglesias (ESP)	6
Adam Kakhriev (FRA)	4
Richard Schröder (GER)	8
Joona Vuoti (FIN)	3

Semifinals
Saifedine Alekma (FRA)	2
Pouria Taherkhani (GER)	8
Gabriel Iglesias (ESP)	11
Richard Schröder (GER)	1

Final
Pouria Taherkhani (GER)	7^{F}
Gabriel Iglesias (ESP)	2

Repechage 2 of 4
Mateusz Pędzicki (POL)	15
Marcel Käppeler (GER)	4
Lukas Lins (AUT)	0
Yerkhan Bexultanov (KAZ)	6

Repechage 3 of 4
Mateusz Pędzicki (POL)	5
Adam Kakhriev (FRA)	8
Yerkhan Bexultanov (KAZ)	4
Umar Mavlaev (SUI)	3

Bronze medals
Adam Kakhriev (FRA)	7
Saifedine Alekma (FRA)	7
Yerkhan Bexultanov (KAZ)	10
Richard Schröder (GER)	0

==== Men's freestyle 86 kg ====
Round of 16
Dauren Kurugliev (GRE)	11
Taylor Lujan (USA)	0
Ivars Samušonoks (LAT)	10
Matteo Monteiro (CPV)	0
Ethan Ramos (PUR)	2^{F}
Kimi Käppeli (SUI)	0
Domantas Pauliuščenko (LTU)	1
Lars Schäfle (GER)	5
Krzysztof Sadowik (POL)	5
Samuel Scherrer (SUI)	3
Uri Kalashnikov (ISR)	2
Joshua Morodion (GER)	3
Alans Amirovs (LAT)	4
Miko Elkala (FIN)	3

Quarterfinals
Dauren Kurugliev (GRE)	WO
Ivars Samušonoks (LAT)
Ethan Ramos (PUR)	2
Lars Schäfle (GER)	7
Krzysztof Sadowik (POL)	0
Joshua Morodion (GER)	3
Alans Amirovs (LAT)	4
Mark Hall (USA)	4

Semifinals
Dauren Kurugliev (GRE)	6
Lars Schäfle (GER)	0
Joshua Morodion (GER)	0
Mark Hall (USA)	2^{F}

Final
Dauren Kurugliev (GRE)	10
Mark Hall (USA)	4

Repechage 1 of 4
Taylor Lujan (USA)	10
Matteo Monteiro (CPV)	0
Kimi Käppeli (SUI)	1
Domantas Pauliuščenko (LTU)	5
Samuel Scherrer (SUI)	3
Uri Kalashnikov (ISR)	0

Repechage 2 of 4
Taylor Lujan (USA)	1
Alans Amirovs (LAT)	4^{F}
Domantas Pauliuščenko (LTU)	1
Krzysztof Sadowik (POL)	3
Samuel Scherrer (SUI)	1
Ethan Ramos (PUR)	7
Miko Elkala (FIN)	WO
Ivars Samušonoks (LAT)

Repechage 3 of 4
Taylor Lujan (USA)	9
Krzysztof Sadowik (POL)	0
Ethan Ramos (PUR)	13
Miko Elkala (FIN)	2

Bronze medals
Taylor Lujan (USA)	5
Lars Schäfle (GER)	1
Ethan Ramos (PUR)	2
Joshua Morodion (GER)	9

==== Men's freestyle 92 kg ====
Quarterfinals		Semifinals		Final
Camden McDanel (USA)	4^{F}
Islyambek Ilyassov (KAZ)	0	Camden McDanel (USA)	7
Benjamin Greil (AUT)	12	Benjamin Greil (AUT)	2
Filip Rogut (POL)	6			Camden McDanel (USA)	11
Rahmatullah Moradi (GER)	1			Abdimanap Baigenzheyev (KAZ)	0
Abdimanap Baigenzheyev (KAZ)	3	Abdimanap Baigenzheyev (KAZ)	6
Sali Saliev (BUL)	1	Michał Bielawski (POL)	1
Michał Bielawski (POL)	11

Repechage 1 of 2
Islyambek Ilyassov (KAZ)	9
Filip Rogut (POL)	2
Rahmatullah Moradi (GER)	2
Sali Saliev (BUL)	4

Bronze medals
Islyambek Ilyassov (KAZ)	1
Michał Bielawski (POL)	11
Sali Saliev (BUL)	3
Benjamin Greil (AUT)	14

==== Men's freestyle 97 kg ====
Round of 16
Ertuğrul Ağca (GER)	11
Nurdaulet Zauytbek (KAZ)	0
Michael Macchiavello (USA)	11
Mohamed Saadaoui (TUN)	1

Quarterfinals
Ertuğrul Ağca (GER)	2
Adlan Viskhanov (FRA)	3
Nate Jackson (USA)	13
Florin Tripon (ROU)	0
Michael Macchiavello (USA)	11
Lukas Krasauskas (LTU)	0
Wiktor Hasa (POL)	1
Tarik Azzouzi (BEL)	1

Semifinals
Adlan Viskhanov (FRA)	1
Nate Jackson (USA)	9
Michael Macchiavello (USA)	10
Tarik Azzouzi (BEL)	0

Final
Nate Jackson (USA)	2
Michael Macchiavello (USA)	4

Repechage 2 of 4
Nurdaulet Zauytbek (KAZ)	0
Wiktor Hasa (POL)	4^{F}
Mohamed Saadaoui (TUN)	7
Florin Tripon (ROU)	3

Repechage 3 of 4
Wiktor Hasa (POL)	0
Lukas Krasauskas (LTU)	10
Mohamed Saadaoui (TUN)	0
Ertuğrul Ağca (GER)	10

Bronze medals
Lukas Krasauskas (LTU)	0
Adlan Viskhanov (FRA)	11
Ertuğrul Ağca (GER)	10
Tarik Azzouzi (BEL)	0

==== Men's freestyle 125 kg ====
Pos	Athlete	Pld	W	L	CP	TP	USA	PUR	AUT	FRA
1	Hayden Zillmer (USA)	3	3	0	11	25	—	10–0	5–0	10–0
2	Jonovan Smith (PUR)	3	2	1	6	9	0–4 SU	—	3–1	6–5
3	Johannes Ludescher (AUT)	3	1	2	5	11	0–3 PO	1–3 PO1	—	10–0
4	Levan Lagvilava (FRA)	3	0	3	1	5	0–4 SU	1–3 PO1	0–4 SU	—

Source: UWW

Pos	Athlete	Pld	W	L	CP	TP	USA	KAZ	GER
1	Trent Hillger (USA)	2	2	0	7	18	—	7–0	11–0
2	Omar Eyubov (KAZ)	2	1	1	3	2	0–3 PO	—	2–1
3	Lucas Gansi (GER)	2	0	2	1	1	0–4 SU	1–3 PO1	—

Source: UWW

Semifinals
Hayden Zillmer (USA)	6
Omar Eyubov (KAZ)	0
Jonovan Smith (PUR)	0
Trent Hillger (USA)	2

Final
Hayden Zillmer (USA)	9
Trent Hillger (USA)	2
Third place
Omar Eyubov (KAZ)	1
Jonovan Smith (PUR)	1

=== Men's Greco-Roman ===
==== Men's Greco-Roman 55 kg ====
Pos	Athlete	Pld	W	L	CP	TP	GEO	GEO	GEO	FRA
1	Giorgi Tokhadze (GEO)	3	3	0	12	26	—	9–0	8–0	9–0
2	Ramaz Silagava (GEO)	3	2	1	3	20	0–4 SU	—	1–1	WO
3	Giorgi Kochalidze (GEO)	3	1	2	1	13	0–4 SU	1–3 PO1	—	WO
4	Raymond Langlet (FRA)	3	0	3	0	5	0–4 SU	0–5 IN	0–5 IN	—

Source: UWW

==== Men's Greco-Roman 60 kg ====
Round of 32
	Score	
Marat Garipov (BRA)	0–8	Lucas Lo Grasso (FRA)
Ilian Ainaoui (FRA)	6–3	Jamal Valizadeh (UWW)

Round of 16
Lucas Lo Grasso (FRA)	8
Daniel Bobillo (ESP)	0
Beso Makharadze (GEO)	4
Melkamu Fetene (ISR)	12
Dimitri Khachidze (GEO)	5
Grzegorz Kunkel (POL)	0
Romeo Beridze (GEO)	11
Yassine Hkiri (TUN)	2
Taylor LaMont (USA)	11
Romio Goliath (NAM)	2
Nugzari Tsurtsumia (GEO)	11
Abere Fetene (ISR)	2
Rashad Orujevi (GEO)	1
Nikolai Mohammadi (DEN)	3
Aser Ebro (ESP)	1
Ilian Ainaoui (FRA)	3

Quarterfinals
Lucas Lo Grasso (FRA)	1
Melkamu Fetene (ISR)	3
Dimitri Khachidze (GEO)	0
Romeo Beridze (GEO)	2
Taylor LaMont (USA)	3
Nugzari Tsurtsumia (GEO)	3
Nikolai Mohammadi (DEN)	9
Ilian Ainaoui (FRA)	0

Semifinals
Melkamu Fetene (ISR)	1
Romeo Beridze (GEO)	3
Nugzari Tsurtsumia (GEO)	1
Nikolai Mohammadi (DEN)	6

Final
Romeo Beridze (GEO)	8
Nikolai Mohammadi (DEN)	0

Repechage 2 of 6
Marat Garipov (BRA)	10
Aser Ebro (ESP)	2
Jamal Valizadeh (UWW)	3
Daniel Bobillo (ESP)	2

Repechage 3 of 6
Marat Garipov (BRA)	2
Rashad Orujevi (GEO)	8
Abere Fetene (ISR)	7
Romio Goliath (NAM)	5
Yassine Hkiri (TUN)	9
Grzegorz Kunkel (POL)	0
Beso Makharadze (GEO)	11
Jamal Valizadeh (UWW)	0

Repechage 4 of 6
Rashad Orujevi (GEO)	4
Lucas Lo Grasso (FRA)	13
Abere Fetene (ISR)	0
Dimitri Khachidze (GEO)	8
Yassine Hkiri (TUN)	7
Taylor LaMont (USA)	9
Beso Makharadze (GEO)	9
Ilian Ainaoui (FRA)	0

Repechage 5 of 6
Lucas Lo Grasso (FRA)	3
Dimitri Khachidze (GEO)	5
Taylor LaMont (USA)	1
Beso Makharadze (GEO)	9

Bronze medals
Dimitri Khachidze (GEO)	WO
Nugzari Tsurtsumia (GEO)
Beso Makharadze (GEO)	0
Melkamu Fetene (ISR)	9

==== Men's Greco-Roman 63 kg ====
Pos	Athlete	Pld	W	L	CP	TP	GEO	SUI	FRA	GEO
1	Rati Khozrevanidze (GEO)	3	3	0	13	17	—	9–1	8–0	WO
2	Mathias Martinetti (SUI)	3	2	1	9	12	1–4 SU1	—	4–1 Fall	7–5
3	Gildas Chambinaud (FRA)	3	1	2	5	1	0–4 SU	0–5 FA	—	WO
—	Avtandil Mamaladze (GEO)	3	0	3	1	5	0–5 FO	1–3 PO1	0–5 FO	—

Source: UWW

Pos	Athlete	Pld	W	L	CP	TP	GEO	GEO	SUI
1	Beka Guruli (GEO)	2	2	0	7	16	—	7–7	9–0
2	Anri Khozrevanidze (GEO)	2	1	1	4	10	1–3 PO1	—	3–0
3	Jonas Urs Müller (SUI)	2	0	2	0	0	0–4 SU	0–3 PO	—

Source: UWW

Semifinals
Rati Khozrevanidze (GEO)	11
Anri Khozrevanidze (GEO)	9
Mathias Martinetti (SUI)	0
Beka Guruli (GEO)	8

Final
Rati Khozrevanidze (GEO)	4^{F}
Beka Guruli (GEO)	1
Third place
Anri Khozrevanidze (GEO)	8
Mathias Martinetti (SUI)	0

==== Men's Greco-Roman 67 kg ====
Round of 16
Shon Nadorgin (ISR)	3
Giorgi Shotadze (GEO)	6
Saya Brunner (SUI)	0
Tigran Galustyan (FRA)	8
Dorien Hutter (SUI)	1
Nika Broladze (GEO)	9
Fritz Reber (SUI)	9
Hocine Akli Berc (FRA)	0

Quarterfinals
Giorgi Shotadze (GEO)	12
Souleymen Nasr (TUN)	3
Tigran Galustyan (FRA)	10
William Reenberg (DEN)	0
Nika Broladze (GEO)	7
Nestori Mannila (FIN)	2
Fritz Reber (SUI)	3
Michał Biskupski (POL)	0

Semifinals
Giorgi Shotadze (GEO)	0
Tigran Galustyan (FRA)	8^{C}
Nika Broladze (GEO)	9
Fritz Reber (SUI)	9

Final
Tigran Galustyan (FRA)	2
Nika Broladze (GEO)	1

Repechage 2 of 4
Shon Nadorgin (ISR)	14
Michał Biskupski (POL)	6
Saya Brunner (SUI)	0
Nestori Mannila (FIN)	7
Dorien Hutter (SUI)	0
William Reenberg (DEN)	5
Hocine Akli Berc (FRA)	0
Souleymen Nasr (TUN)	9

Repechage 3 of 4
Shon Nadorgin (ISR)	8
Nestori Mannila (FIN)	4
William Reenberg (DEN)	1
Souleymen Nasr (TUN)	7

Bronze medals
Shon Nadorgin (ISR)	0
Giorgi Shotadze (GEO)	9^{F}
Souleymen Nasr (TUN)	7
Fritz Reber (SUI)	2

==== Men's Greco-Roman 72 kg ====
Pos	Athlete	Pld	W	L	CP	TP	GEO	POL	FRA
1	Giorgi Chkhikvadze (GEO)	2	2	0	7	16	—	8–0	8–1
2	Piotr Lewandowski (POL)	2	1	1	3	4	0–4 SU	—	4–3
3	Naïm Bolaky-Meïte (FRA)	2	0	2	2	4	1–3 PO1	1–3 PO1	—

Source: UWW

Pos	Athlete	Pld	W	L	CP	TP	GEO	FIN	POL
1	Otar Abuladze (GEO)	2	2	0	6	9	—	6–3	3–0
2	Matias Lipasti (FIN)	2	1	1	4	12	1–3 PO1	—	9–6
3	Piotr Stolarczyk (POL)	2	0	2	1	6	0–3 PO	1–3 PO1	—

Source: UWW

Semifinals
Giorgi Chkhikvadze (GEO)	3
Matias Lipasti (FIN)	1
Piotr Lewandowski (POL)	0
Otar Abuladze (GEO)	8

Final
Giorgi Chkhikvadze (GEO)	9
Otar Abuladze (GEO)	1
Third place
Matias Lipasti (FIN)	10
Piotr Lewandowski (POL)	3

==== Men's Greco-Roman 77 kg ====
Round of 16
Arsen Julfalakyan (ARG)	8
Marcos Sánchez-Silva (ESP)	0
Sami Slama (TUN)	9
Nikoloz Tchikaidze (GEO)	0
Kamil Czarnecki (POL)	0
Tornike Mikeladze (GEO)	8
Aleksander Mielewczyk (POL)	9
Devin Benhard (NAM)	0
Konrad Kozłowski (POL)	2
Khvicha Ananidze (GEO)	10

Quarterfinals
Arsen Julfalakyan (ARG)	9
Sami Slama (TUN)	1
Tornike Mikeladze (GEO)	10
David Loher (SUI)	0
Aleksander Mielewczyk (POL)	3
Oliver Krüger (DEN)	3
Khvicha Ananidze (GEO)	3
Júnior Benítez (ESP)	3

Semifinals
Arsen Julfalakyan (ARG)	6
Tornike Mikeladze (GEO)	3
Oliver Krüger (DEN)	9
Khvicha Ananidze (GEO)	2

Final
Arsen Julfalakyan (ARG)	3^{R}
Oliver Krüger (DEN)	7

Repechage 1 of 4
Marcos Sánchez-Silva (ESP)
Nikoloz Tchikaidze (GEO)	WO

Repechage 2 of 4
Nikoloz Tchikaidze (GEO)	0
Júnior Benítez (ESP)	9
Kamil Czarnecki (POL)	5
Aleksander Mielewczyk (POL)	2
Devin Benhard (NAM)	1
David Loher (SUI)	9
Konrad Kozłowski (POL)	2^{R}
Sami Slama (TUN)	9

Repechage 3 of 4
Júnior Benítez (ESP)	3
Kamil Czarnecki (POL)	3
David Loher (SUI)	10^{F}
Sami Slama (TUN)	10

Bronze medals
Júnior Benítez (ESP)	0
Tornike Mikeladze (GEO)	9
David Loher (SUI)	0
Khvicha Ananidze (GEO)	8

==== Men's Greco-Roman 82 kg ====
Pos	Athlete	Pld	W	L	CP	TP	GEO	FRA	FRA	FRA
1	Gela Bolkvadze (GEO)	3	3	0	9	17	—	3–3	7–2	7–2
2	Vladimeri Karchaidze (FRA)	3	2	1	10	18	1–3 PO1	—	11–2	4–0 Fall
3	Brandon Guiadem Kamdem (FRA)	3	1	2	5	5	1–3 PO1	1–4 SU1	—	1–1
4	Haik Sargsyan (FRA)	3	0	3	2	3	1–3 PO1	0–5 FA	1–3 PO1	—

Source: UWW

==== Men's Greco-Roman 87 kg ====
Round of 16
Artem Shapovalov (FIN)	3
Adam Gardzioła (POL)	5
Daniel Herrero (ESP)	1
Turpal Bisultanov (DEN)	10
Waltteri Latvala (FIN)	0
Tourpal Ali Magamadov (FRA)	10
Aivengo Rikadze (GEO)	5
Hakim Trabelsi (TUN)	2

Quarterfinals
Adam Gardzioła (POL)	8
Lasha Gobadze (GEO)	10^{F}
Turpal Bisultanov (DEN)	8
Arkadiusz Kułynycz (POL)	3
Tourpal Ali Magamadov (FRA)	1
Gurami Khetsuriani (GEO)	7
Aivengo Rikadze (GEO)	5
Islam Aliev (POL)	2

Semifinals
Lasha Gobadze (GEO)	3
Turpal Bisultanov (DEN)	2
Gurami Khetsuriani (GEO)	3
Aivengo Rikadze (GEO)	1

Final
Lasha Gobadze (GEO)	1
Gurami Khetsuriani (GEO)	4

Repechage 2 of 4
Artem Shapovalov (FIN)	5
Islam Aliev (POL)	6
Daniel Herrero (ESP)	0
Tourpal Ali Magamadov (FRA)	9
Waltteri Latvala (FIN)	5
Arkadiusz Kułynycz (POL)	9
Hakim Trabelsi (TUN)	4
Adam Gardzioła (POL)	7

Repechage 3 of 4
Islam Aliev (POL)	3
Tourpal Ali Magamadov (FRA)	11
Arkadiusz Kułynycz (POL)	2^{F}
Adam Gardzioła (POL)	0

Bronze medals
Tourpal Ali Magamadov (FRA)	0
Turpal Bisultanov (DEN)	9
Arkadiusz Kułynycz (POL)	1
Aivengo Rikadze (GEO)	4

==== Men's Greco-Roman 97 kg ====
Pos	Athlete	Pld	W	L	CP	TP	GEO	POL	POL
1	Giorgi Melia (GEO)	2	2	0	8	5	—	5–1	WO
2	Igor Shepetun (POL)	2	1	1	5	1	1–3 PO1	—	WO
—	Jakub Antoszewski (POL)	2	0	2	0	0	0–5 FO	0–5 FO	—

Source: UWW

Pos	Athlete	Pld	W	L	CP	TP	GEO	POL	FRA
1	Robert Kobliashvili (GEO)	2	2	0	6	10	—	4–1	6–3
2	Artsiom Shumski (POL)	2	1	1	6	7	1–3 PO1	—	6–0 Fall
3	Loïc Samen (FRA)	2	0	2	1	3	1–3 PO1	0–5 FA	—

Source: UWW

Semifinals
Giorgi Melia (GEO)	2
Artsiom Shumski (POL)	1
Igor Shepetun (POL)	1
Robert Kobliashvili (GEO)	5

Final
Giorgi Melia (GEO)	0
Robert Kobliashvili (GEO)	7
Third place
Artsiom Shumski (POL)	8
Igor Shepetun (POL)	0

==== Men's Greco-Roman 130 kg ====
Pos	Athlete	Pld	W	L	CP	TP	GEO	GEO
1	Saba Chilashvili (GEO)	1	1	0	3	2	—	2–1
2	Giorgi Tsopurashvili (GEO)	1	0	1	1	1	1–3 PO1	—

Source: UWW

== See also ==
- Grand Prix de France Henri Deglane 2024 – Women's freestyle
