= 2022 World Wrestling Championships – Women's freestyle 57 kg =

Wrestling competitions

Women's freestyle 57 kg at the 2022 World Championships
- Venue: Štark Arena
- Dates: 14–15 September 2022
- Competitors: 19 from 19 nations

Medalists
gold medal	Tsugumi Sakurai	Japan
silver medal	Helen Maroulis	United States
bronze medal	Anhelina Lysak	Poland
bronze medal	Alina Hrushyna	Ukraine

The women's freestyle 57 kilograms is a competition featured at the 2022 World Wrestling Championships, and was held in Belgrade, Serbia on 14 and 15 September 2022.

This freestyle wrestling competition consists of a single-elimination tournament, with a repechage used to determine the winner of two bronze medals. The two finalists face off for gold and silver medals. Each wrestler who loses to one of the two finalists moves into the repechage, culminating in a pair of bronze medal matches featuring the semifinal losers each facing the remaining repechage opponent from their half of the bracket.

== Results ==
Legend

- F — Won by fall
- WO — Won by walkover

=== Final ===
Final
Helen Maroulis (USA)	0
Tsugumi Sakurai (JPN)	3

=== Top half ===
Round of 32
Hannah Taylor (CAN)	2
Sarita Mor (IND)	4

Round of 16
Helen Maroulis (USA)	4^{F}
Emma Tissina (KAZ)	0
Sarita Mor (IND)	0
Anhelina Lysak (POL)	7^{F}
~~Alma Valencia (MEX)~~
Laylokhon Sobirova (UZB)	WO
Kim Hyung-joo (KOR)	4
Erkhembayaryn Davaachimeg (MGL)	13^{F}

Quarterfinals
Helen Maroulis (USA)	10
Anhelina Lysak (POL)	0
Laylokhon Sobirova (UZB)	0
Erkhembayaryn Davaachimeg (MGL)	4

Semifinals
Helen Maroulis (USA)	7^{F}
Erkhembayaryn Davaachimeg (MGL)	1

=== Bottom half ===
Round of 32
Nguyễn Thị Mỹ Trang (VIE)	0
Esther Kolawole (NGR)	2
Bediha Gün (TUR)	0
Feng Yongxin (CHN)	10

Round of 16
Giullia Penalber (BRA)	12
Zhala Aliyeva (AZE)	9^{F}
Esther Kolawole (NGR)	3
Sandra Paruszewski (GER)	2
Alina Hrushyna (UKR)	7^{F}
Feng Yongxin (CHN)	0
Tsugumi Sakurai (JPN)	12
Evelina Nikolova (BUL)	0

Quarterfinals
Zhala Aliyeva (AZE)	14
Esther Kolawole (NGR)	13
Alina Hrushyna (UKR)	2
Tsugumi Sakurai (JPN)	2

Semifinals
Zhala Aliyeva (AZE)	0
Tsugumi Sakurai (JPN)	10

=== Repechage ===
Repechage round 2
Emma Tissina (KAZ)	0
Anhelina Lysak (POL)	10
Evelina Nikolova (BUL)	0
Alina Hrushyna (UKR)	10

Bronze medals
Anhelina Lysak (POL)	10
Erkhembayaryn Davaachimeg (MGL)	6
Alina Hrushyna (UKR)	10
Zhala Aliyeva (AZE)	0

== Final standing ==
Rank	Athlete
1st place, gold medalist(s)	Tsugumi Sakurai (JPN)
2nd place, silver medalist(s)	Helen Maroulis (USA)
3rd place, bronze medalist(s)	Anhelina Lysak (POL)
3rd place, bronze medalist(s)	Alina Hrushyna (UKR)
5	Erkhembayaryn Davaachimeg (MGL)
5	Zhala Aliyeva (AZE)
7	Esther Kolawole (NGR)
8	Laylokhon Sobirova (UZB)
9	Feng Yongxin (CHN)
10	Sarita Mor (IND)
11	Sandra Paruszewski (GER)
12	Hannah Taylor (CAN)
13	Giullia Penalber (BRA)
14	Kim Hyung-joo (KOR)
15	Nguyễn Thị Mỹ Trang (VIE)
16	Bediha Gün (TUR)
17	Emma Tissina (KAZ)
18	Evelina Nikolova (BUL)
—	Alma Valencia (MEX)
