= 2021 U23 World Wrestling Championships – Women's freestyle 57 kg =

Wrestling Championship

The women's freestyle 57 kilograms is a competition featured at the 2021 U23 World Wrestling Championships, and was held in Belgrade, Serbia on 4 and 5 November.

== Medalists ==
Gold	Alina Hrushyna; Ukraine
Silver	Kristina Mikhneva; Russia
Bronze	Esther Kolawole; Nigeria
Bronze	Hannah Taylor; Canada

== Results ==
Legend

- F — Won by fall

=== Main bracket ===
Round of 16
Zeinep Bayanova (KAZ)	0
Amanda Martinez (USA)	10
Esther Kolawole (NGR)	9
Nazira Marsbek Kyzy (KGZ)	6
Elvira Kamaloğlu (TUR)	8
Hanna Vaher (BLR)	2
Othelie Høie (NOR)	3
Aurora Russo (ITA)	2
Erika Bognár (HUN)	2
Nitika Kataria (IND)	3
Alina Hrushyna (UKR)	4^{F}
Hannah Taylor (CAN)	0

Quarterfinals
Kristina Mikhneva (RUS)	4
Patrycja Gil (POL)	3
Amanda Martinez (USA)	0
Esther Kolawole (NGR)	11
Elvira Kamaloğlu (TUR)	1
Othelie Høie (NOR)	5^{F}
Nitika Kataria (IND)	0
Alina Hrushyna (UKR)	6^{F}

Semifinals
Kristina Mikhneva (RUS)	9^{F}
Esther Kolawole (NGR)	5
Othelie Høie (NOR)	0
Alina Hrushyna (UKR)	10^{F}

Final
Kristina Mikhneva (RUS)	1
Alina Hrushyna (UKR)	5

=== Repechage ===
Repechage round
Hannah Taylor (CAN)	12
Nitika Kataria (IND)	1

Bronze medals
Patrycja Gil (POL)	8
Esther Kolawole (NGR)	9
Hannah Taylor (CAN)	12
Othelie Høie (NOR)	8
