= 2021 World Wrestling Championships – Women's freestyle 55 kg =

Wrestling competitions

Women's freestyle 55 kg at the 2021 World Championships
- Venue: Nye Jordal Amfi
- Dates: 4–5 October 2021
- Competitors: 14 from 14 nations

Medalists
gold medal	Tsugumi Sakurai	Japan
silver medal	Nina Hemmer	Germany
bronze medal	Oleksandra Khomenets	Ukraine
bronze medal	Jenna Burkert	United States

The women's freestyle 55 kilograms is a competition featured at the 2021 World Wrestling Championships, and was held in Oslo, Norway on 4 and 5 October.

This freestyle wrestling competition consists of a single-elimination tournament, with a repechage used to determine the winner of two bronze medals. The two finalists face off for gold and silver medals. Each wrestler who loses to one of the two finalists moves into the repechage, culminating in a pair of bronze medal matches featuring the semifinal losers each facing the remaining repechage opponent from their half of the bracket.

Each bout consists of a single round within a six-minute limit including two halves of three minutes. The wrestler who scores more points is the winner.

Tsugumi Sakurai from Japan won the gold medal after dominating Nina Hemmer from Germany in the final, Sakurai won the match by technical superiority 10–0. Oleksandra Khomenets of Ukraine and Jenna Burkert from the United States shared the bronze medals. Khomenets beat Olga Khoroshavtseva from the Russian Wrestling Federation and Jenna Burkert beat Pinki from India in their bronze medal matches.

== Results ==
Legend

- F — Won by fall

=== Main bracket ===
Round of 16
Oleksandra Khomenets (UKR)	4
Tsugumi Sakurai (JPN)	10
Olga Khoroshavtseva (RWF)	6
Erdenechimegiin Sumiyaa (MGL)	2
Mehlika Öztürk (TUR)	4
Esther Kolawole (NGR)	10
Andreea Ana (ROU)	1
Natasha Fox (CAN)	1
Jenna Burkert (USA)	4
Nina Hemmer (GER)	14
Kim So-yeon (KOR)	0
Pinki (IND)	5

Quarterfinals
Roksana Zasina (POL)	0
Tsugumi Sakurai (JPN)	3
Olga Khoroshavtseva (RWF)	12
Esther Kolawole (NGR)	2
Andreea Ana (ROU)	2
Nina Hemmer (GER)	3
Pinki (IND)	4^{F}
Aisha Ualishan (KAZ)	1

Semifinals
Tsugumi Sakurai (JPN)	6
Olga Khoroshavtseva (RWF)	2
Nina Hemmer (GER)	8
Pinki (IND)	6

Final
Tsugumi Sakurai (JPN)	10
Nina Hemmer (GER)	0

=== Repechage ===
Repechage round 1
Oleksandra Khomenets (UKR)	8
Roksana Zasina (POL)	6
Jenna Burkert (USA)	4
Andreea Ana (ROU)	2

Bronze medals
Oleksandra Khomenets (UKR)	10
Olga Khoroshavtseva (RWF)	8
Jenna Burkert (USA)	5
Pinki (IND)	2

== Final standing ==
Rank	Athlete
1st place, gold medalist(s)	Tsugumi Sakurai (JPN)
2nd place, silver medalist(s)	Nina Hemmer (GER)
3rd place, bronze medalist(s)	Oleksandra Khomenets (UKR)
3rd place, bronze medalist(s)	Jenna Burkert (USA)
5	Olga Khoroshavtseva (RWF)
5	Pinki (IND)
7	Andreea Ana (ROU)
8	Esther Kolawole (NGR)
9	Roksana Zasina (POL)
10	Mehlika Öztürk (TUR)
11	Erdenechimegiin Sumiyaa (MGL)
12	Natasha Fox (CAN)
13	Aisha Ualishan (KAZ)
14	Kim So-yeon (KOR)
