= Wrestling at the 2022 Mediterranean Games – Women's freestyle 57 kg =

Wrestling competitions

Women's Freestyle 57 kg at the 2022 Mediterranean Games
- Venue: EMEC Hall
- Date: 28–29 June
- Competitors: 7 from 7 nations

Medalists
gold medal	Bediha Gün	Turkey
silver medal	Siwar Bousetta	Tunisia
bronze medal	Tatiana Debien	France

The women's freestyle 57 kg competition of the wrestling events at the 2022 Mediterranean Games in Oran, Algeria, was held from 28 June to 29 June at the EMEC Hall.

== Results ==
26 June

=== Elimination groups ===
==== Group A ====
Pos	Athlete	Pld	W	L	CP	TP
1	Bediha Gün (TUR)	3	3	0	14	17
2	Tatiana Debien (FRA)	3	2	1	8	11
3	Rayane Houfaf (ALG)	3	1	2	5	2
4	Farah Ali Hussein (EGY)	3	0	3	1	5

Source: Oran 2022

	Score		CP
Rayane Houfaf (ALG)	0–7 Fall	Tatiana Debien (FRA)	0–5 VFA
Bediha Gün (TUR)	10–0	Farah Ali Hussein (EGY)	4–0 VSU
Rayane Houfaf (ALG)	0–3 Fall	Bediha Gün (TUR)	0–5 VFA
Tatiana Debien (FRA)	4–2	Farah Ali Hussein (EGY)	3–1 VPO1
Farah Ali Hussein (EGY)	0–2 Fall	Rayane Houfaf (ALG)	0–5 VFA
Tatiana Debien (FRA)	0–4 Fall	Bediha Gün (TUR)	0–5 VFA

==== Group B ====
Pos	Athlete	Pld	W	L	CP	TP
1	Siwar Bousetta (TUN)	2	2	0	10	4
2	Graciela Sánchez (ESP)	2	1	1	5	0
—	Morena De Vita (ITA)	2	0	2	0	0

Source: Oran 2022

	Score		CP
~~Morena De Vita (ITA)~~	WO	Siwar Bousetta (TUN)	0–5 VFO
Graciela Sánchez (ESP)	WO	~~Morena De Vita (ITA)~~	5–0 VFO
Siwar Bousetta (TUN)	4–0 Fall	Graciela Sánchez (ESP)	5–0 VFA

Semifinals
Bediha Gün (TUR)	6^{F}
Graciela Sánchez (ESP)	0
Tatiana Debien (FRA)	3
Siwar Bousetta (TUN)	4

Final
Bediha Gün (TUR)	5^{F}
Siwar Bousetta (TUN)	0
Bronze medal
Graciela Sánchez (ESP)	3
Tatiana Debien (FRA)	4
