= Nina Hemmer =

German freestyle wrestler

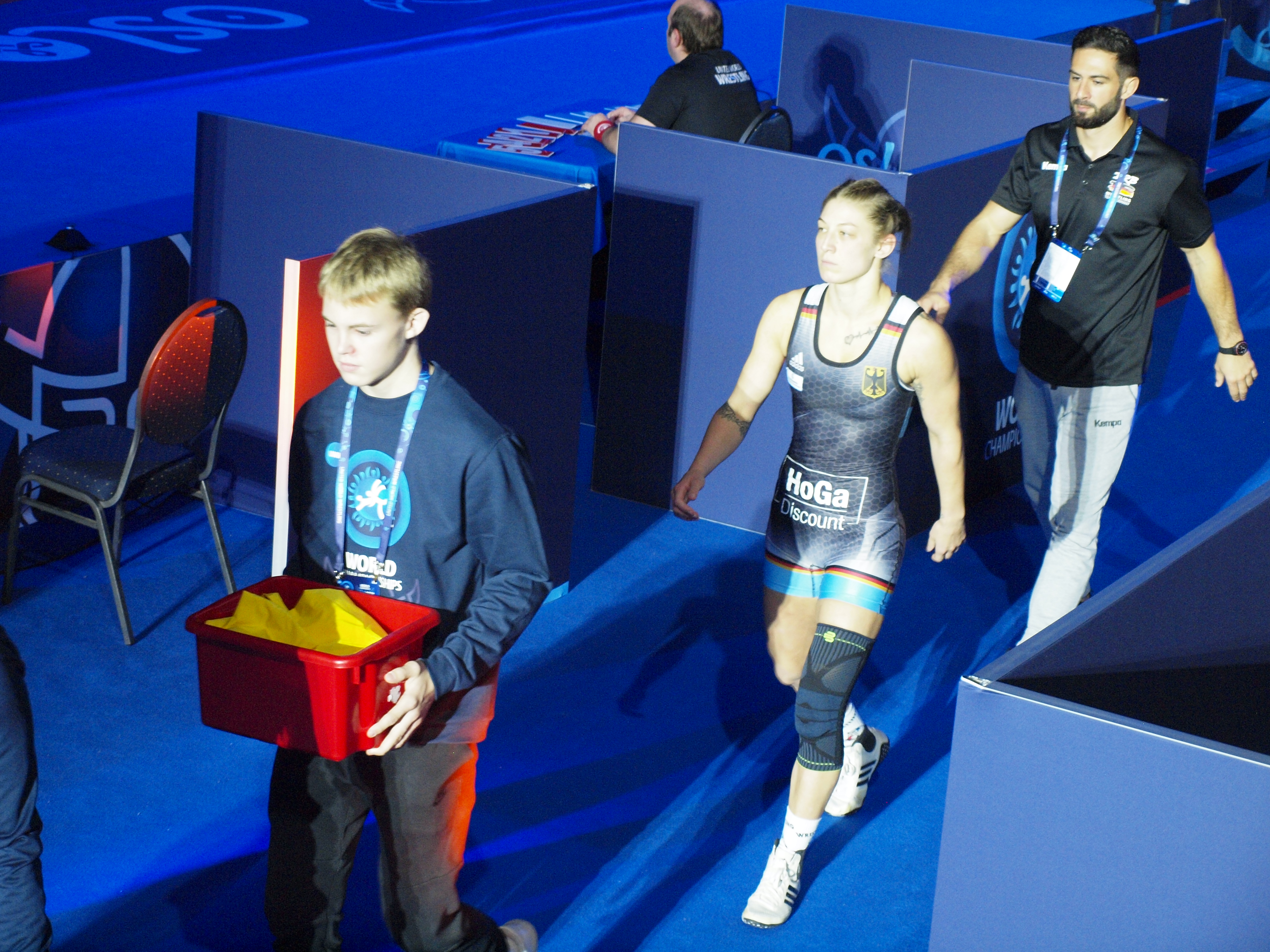
- Nina Hemmer at the 2021 World Wrestling Championships in Oslo, Norway

Personal information
- Nationality: German
- Born: 16 February 1993 (age 33) Köln
- Height: 1.65 m (5 ft 5 in)
- Weight: 55 kg (121 lb)

Sport
- Country: Germany
- Sport: Freestyle wrestling
Medal record
World Championships
| Silver medal – second place | 2021 Oslo | 55 kg |
European Games
| Bronze medal – third place | 2019 Minsk | 53 kg |
European Championships
| Bronze medal – third place | 2016 Riga | 53 kg |
| Bronze medal – third place | 2017 Novi Sad | 53 kg |
Military World Games
| Bronze medal – third place | 2019 Wuhan | 53 kg |

Nina Hemmer (born 16 February 1993) is a German freestyle wrestler. She competed at the 2016 Summer Olympics in Rio de Janeiro in the women's freestyle 53 kg division. She finished in 14th place after losing to Zhong Xuechun of China in the first round. In 2021, she won the silver medal in the women's 55 kg event at the 2021 World Wrestling Championships held in Oslo, Norway.

In March 2021, she competed at the European Qualification Tournament in Budapest, Hungary hoping to qualify for the 2020 Summer Olympics in Tokyo, Japan.

In 2022, she lost her bronze medal match in her event at the Matteo Pellicone Ranking Series 2022 held in Rome, Italy. She competed in the 55 kg event at the 2022 World Wrestling Championships held in Belgrade, Serbia.

She won one of the bronze medals in the women's 53 kg event at the Grand Prix de France Henri Deglane 2023 held in Nice, France.
