= Jenna Burkert =

American freestyle wrestler

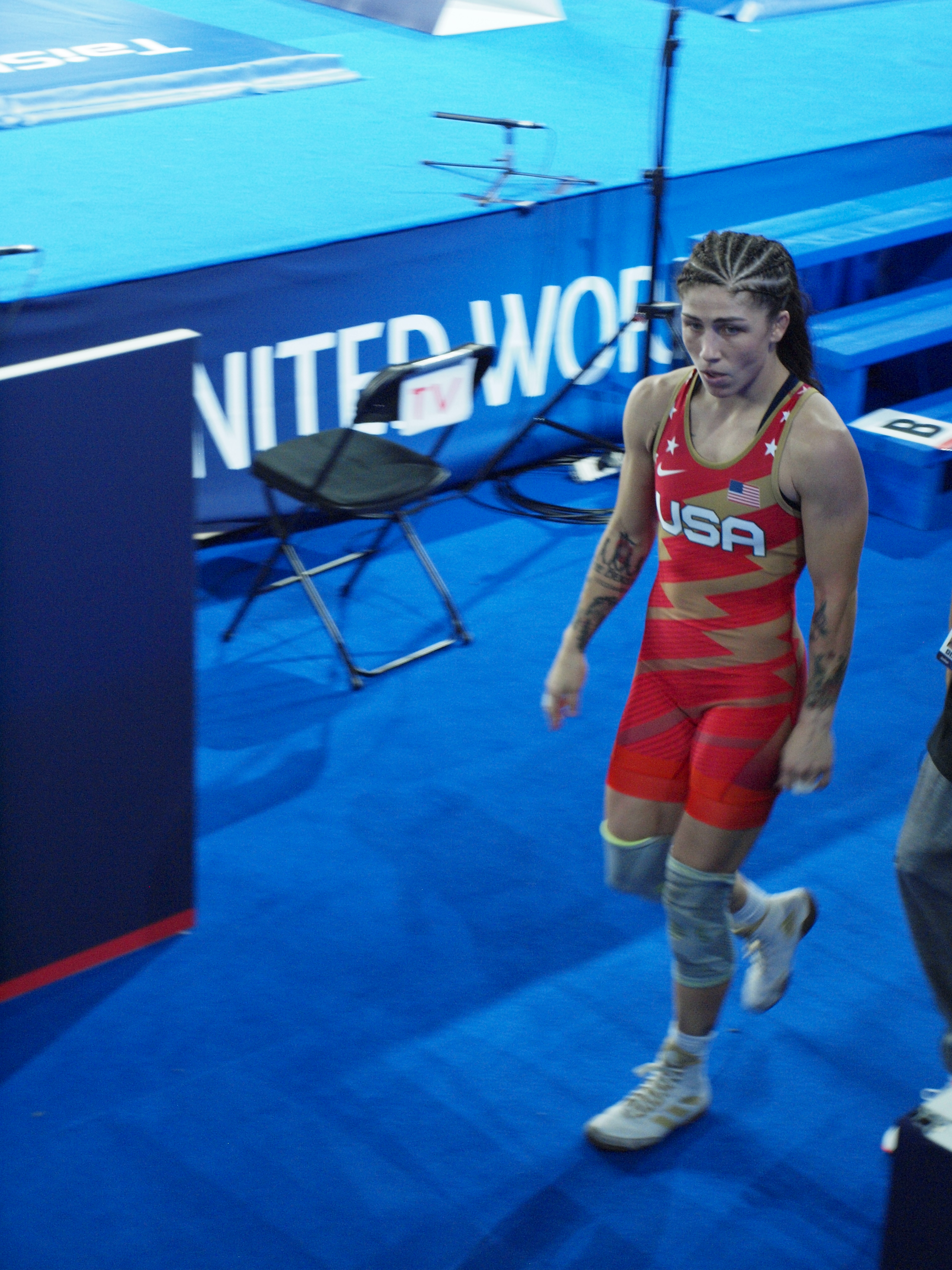
- Jenna Burkert at the 2021 World Wrestling Championships in Oslo, Norway

Personal information
- Full name: Jenna Rose Burkert
- Born: May 9, 1993 (age 33)
- Height: 5 ft 3 in (160 cm)

Sport
- Country: United States
- Sport: Amateur wrestling
- Event: Freestyle
Medal record
Women's freestyle wrestling
Representing United States
World Championships
Bronze medal – third place	2021 Oslo	55 kg
Pan American Games
Silver medal – second place	2019 Lima	57 kg

Jenna Rose Burkert (born May 9, 1993) is a retired American freestyle wrestler and currently an amateur wrestling coach. She won one of the bronze medals in the women's 55 kg event at the 2021 World Wrestling Championships held in Oslo, Norway.

== Career ==
Burkert competed in the girls' freestyle 60 kg event at the 2010 Summer Youth Olympics held in Singapore.

Burkert also competed in the women's 60 kg event at the 2014 World Wrestling Championships in Tashkent, Uzbekistan, in the women's 59 kg event at the 2018 World Wrestling Championships in Budapest, Hungary and in the women's 57 kg event at the 2019 World Wrestling Championships in Nur-Sultan, Kazakhstan.

In 2019, Burkert won the silver medal in the women's 57 kg event at the Pan American Games held in Lima, Peru. In 2021, she won one of the bronze medals in the women's 55 kg event at the World Wrestling Championships held in Oslo, Norway.

In 2024, she announced retirement from wrestling. In May 2024, she announced her join to the Bixby Wrestling High School as a coach. In April 2025, she was named the head girls' wrestling coach at Bixby High School.

== Achievements ==
Year	Tournament	Location	Result	Event
2019	Pan American Games	Lima, Peru	2nd	Freestyle 57 kg
2021	World Championships	Oslo, Norway	3rd	Freestyle 55 kg
