= Wrestling at the 2022 Asian Games – Women's freestyle 57 kg =

Women's freestyle 57 kg at the 2022 Asian Games
- Venue: Lin'an Sports and Culture Centre
- Date: 5 October 2023
- Competitors: 13 from 13 nations

Medalists
gold medal	Tsugumi Sakurai	Japan
silver medal	Jong In-sun	North Korea
bronze medal	Hong Kexin	China
bronze medal	Laylokhon Sobirova	Uzbekistan

The women's freestyle 57 kilograms wrestling competition at the 2022 Asian Games in Hangzhou was held on 5 October 2023 at the Lin'an Sports and Culture Centre.

This freestyle wrestling competition consists of a single-elimination tournament, with a repechage used to determine the winner of two bronze medals. The two finalists face off for gold and silver medals. Each wrestler who loses to one of the two finalists moves into the repechage, culminating in a pair of bronze medal matches featuring the semifinal losers each facing the remaining repechage opponent from their half of the bracket.

== Schedule ==
All times are China Standard Time (UTC+08:00)

Date	Time	Event
Thursday, 5 October 2023	10:00	1/8 finals
Thursday, 5 October 2023	10:00	1/4 finals
Thursday, 5 October 2023	10:00	Semifinals
Thursday, 5 October 2023	10:00	Repechages
Thursday, 5 October 2023	17:00	Finals

== Results ==
Legend

- F — Won by fall

=== Main bracket ===
1/8 finals
Jong In-sun (PRK)	8^{F}
Trần Thị Ánh (VIE)	0
Emma Tissina (KAZ)	8^{F}
Danielle Lim (SGP)	0
Chhoeun Sreylen (CAM)	0
Hong Kexin (CHN)	4^{F}
Tsugumi Sakurai (JPN)	10
Bark Jeong-ae (KOR)	0
Siwangi Dube (NEP)	0
Sriprapa Thokaew (THA)	8^{F}

1/4 finals
Erkhembayaryn Davaachimeg (MGL)	0
Jong In-sun (PRK)	10
Emma Tissina (KAZ)	0
Hong Kexin (CHN)	8^{F}
Mansi Ahlawat (IND)	2
Tsugumi Sakurai (JPN)	5
Sriprapa Thokaew (THA)	0
Laylokhon Sobirova (UZB)	9^{F}

Semifinals
Jong In-sun (PRK)	4
Hong Kexin (CHN)	2
Tsugumi Sakurai (JPN)	11
Laylokhon Sobirova (UZB)	0

Gold medal match
Jong In-sun (PRK)	6
Tsugumi Sakurai (JPN)	7

=== Repechage ===
Repechage round 1
Trần Thị Ánh (VIE)	1
Erkhembayaryn Davaachimeg (MGL)	6^{F}
Bark Jeong-ae (KOR)	0
Mansi Ahlawat (IND)	2

Bronze medal matches
Erkhembayaryn Davaachimeg (MGL)	0
Hong Kexin (CHN)	10
Mansi Ahlawat (IND)	0
Laylokhon Sobirova (UZB)	2^{F}

== Final standing ==
Rank	Athlete
1st place, gold medalist(s)	Tsugumi Sakurai (JPN)
2nd place, silver medalist(s)	Jong In-sun (PRK)
3rd place, bronze medalist(s)	Hong Kexin (CHN)
3rd place, bronze medalist(s)	Laylokhon Sobirova (UZB)
5	Erkhembayaryn Davaachimeg (MGL)
5	Mansi Ahlawat (IND)
7	Emma Tissina (KAZ)
8	Sriprapa Thokaew (THA)
9	Trần Thị Ánh (VIE)
10	Chhoeun Sreylen (CAM)
11	Danielle Lim (SGP)
12	Siwangi Dube (NEP)
13	Bark Jeong-ae (KOR)
