= Wrestling at the 2024 Summer Olympics – Women's freestyle 57 kg =

Women's freestyle 57 kg at the Games of the XXXIII Olympiad
- Venue: Grand Palais Éphémère
- Date: 8–9 August 2024
- Competitors: 16 from 16 nations

Medalists
1st place, gold medalist(s)		Tsugumi Sakurai	Japan
2nd place, silver medalist(s)		Anastasia Nichita	Moldova
3rd place, bronze medalist(s)		Helen Maroulis	United States
3rd place, bronze medalist(s)		Hong Kexin	China

Women's freestyle 57 kilograms competition at the 2024 Summer Olympics in Paris, France, took place on 8–9 August 2024 at the Grand Palais Éphémère in Champ de Mars.

== Background ==
This is the third appearance of the women's welterweight category, debut in 2016 and it has appeared in every games since then.

- 2016: 58kg
- 2020-: 57kg

Tsugumi Sakurai won the event by defeating Anastasia Nichita in the final, returned bronze medalist and 2016 Olympic champion Helen Maroulis and Hong Kexin won the bronze medals respectively.

== Format ==
This freestyle wrestling competition consists of a single-elimination tournament, with a repechage used to determine the winner of two bronze medals. The two finalists face off for gold and silver medals. Each wrestler who loses to one of the two finalists moves into the repechage, culminating in a pair of bronze medal matches featuring the semifinal losers each facing the remaining repechage opponent from their half of the bracket.

== Rules ==
A typical bout consists of two halves of three minutes each separated by a 30-second break. The two competitors compete on a mat, which is nine meters in diameter. Wrestlers try to score points by executing various legal maneuvers. Points ranging from one to five are awarded by the mat referee depending on the degree of difficulty of the maneuvers. Points are also awarded to the opponent in case of infractions such as illegal holds, passivity etc. A wrestler is automatically disqualified if three cautions are awarded during a bout. Forcing an opponent's shoulders to the mat results in an instant victory by fall.

During the course of a match, if a wrestler builds a 10-point advantage over the opponent, the bout is stopped and the leader is declared as the winner by technical superiority. The total scores are totaled at the end of the stipulated six-minute period, and the wrestler with the maximum points wins. In case of a tie, the wrestler who has scored the last point is declared the winner. A competitor might also be declared a winner if the opponent does not turn up or is medically unfit to compete.

== Qualification ==
Sixteen quota places were available with each nation restricted to a maximum of one spot. Five quota places were awarded at the 2023 World Wrestling Championships, which took place from the 16th to 24th of September in Belgrade, Serbia. The finalists of each category in the four continental qualification tournaments (Asia, Europe, the Americas, and the joint Africa & Oceania) were awarded quota places. The remainder of the total quota was allocated at the 2024 World Wrestling Olympic Qualification Tournament, offering a minimum of three quota places.

== Schedule ==
All times are Central European Time (UTC+02:00)

Date	Time	Event
8 August 2024	11:00	Qualification rounds
8 August 2024	18:15	Semifinals
9 August 2024	11:00	Repechage
9 August 2024	19:30	Finals

== Results ==
Sixteen athletes qualified for the competition.

Legend

- F — Won by fall
- R — Retired

=== Main bracket ===
Round of 16
Tsugumi Sakurai (JPN)	6
Hannah Taylor (CAN)	1
Aurora Russo (ITA)	0
Luisa Valverde (ECU)	6^{F}
Helen Maroulis (USA)	7
Anshu Malik (IND)	2
Alina Hrushyna (UKR)	16
Anhelina Lysak (POL)	13
Odunayo Adekuoroye (NGR)	0
Chaimaa Aouissi (ALG)	0^{R}
Boldsaikhan Khongorzul (MGL)	12
Hong Kexin (CHN)	16
Giullia Penalber (BRA)	2^{F}
Rckaela Aquino (GUM)	0
Sandra Paruszewski (GER)	0
Anastasia Nichita (MDA)	9

Quarterfinals
Tsugumi Sakurai (JPN)	11^{F}
Luisa Valverde (ECU)	0
Helen Maroulis (USA)	7
Alina Hrushyna (UKR)	4
Odunayo Adekuoroye (NGR)	8
Hong Kexin (CHN)	10^{F}
Giullia Penalber (BRA)	0
Anastasia Nichita (MDA)	5^{F}

Semifinals
Tsugumi Sakurai (JPN)	10
Helen Maroulis (USA)	4
Hong Kexin (CHN)	7
Anastasia Nichita (MDA)	2^{F}

Final
Tsugumi Sakurai (JPN)	6
Anastasia Nichita (MDA)	0

=== Repechage ===
Repechage
Hannah Taylor (CAN)	13
Luisa Valverde (ECU)	0
Sandra Paruszewski (GER)	0
Giullia Penalber (BRA)	7

Bronze medal matches
Hannah Taylor (CAN)	0
Helen Maroulis (USA)	4^{F}
Giullia Penalber (BRA)	0
Hong Kexin (CHN)	10

== Final standing ==
Rank	Athlete
1st place, gold medalist(s)	Tsugumi Sakurai (JPN)
2nd place, silver medalist(s)	Anastasia Nichita (MDA)
3rd place, bronze medalist(s)	Helen Maroulis (USA)
3rd place, bronze medalist(s)	Hong Kexin (CHN)
5	Hannah Taylor (CAN)
5	Giullia Penalber (BRA)
7	Luisa Valverde (ECU)
8	Odunayo Adekuoroye (NGR)
9	Alina Hrushyna (UKR)
10	Anhelina Łysak (POL)
11	Boldsaikhan Khongorzul (MGL)
12	Anshu Malik (IND)
13	Chaimaa Aouissi (ALG)
14	Rckaela Aquino (GUM)
15	Aurora Russo (ITA)
16	Sandra Paruszewski (GER)
