= Wrestling at the 2019 Pan American Games – Women's freestyle 57 kg =

Women's Freestyle 57 kg at the 2019 Pan American Games
- Venue: Miguel Grau Coliseum
- Dates: August 8
- Competitors: 9 from 9 nations

Medalists
Gold medal	Lissette Antes	Ecuador
Silver medal	Jenna Burkert	United States
Bronze medal	Giullia Penalber	Brazil
Bronze medal	Nes Marie Rodríguez	Puerto Rico

The women's freestyle 57 kg competition of the Wrestling events at the 2019 Pan American Games in Lima was held on August 8 at the Miguel Grau Coliseum.

== Results ==
All times are local (UTC−5)

Legend

- F — Won by fall

=== Final ===
Qualifications
Nes Marie Rodríguez (PUR)	8
Lilianet Duanes (CUB)	6

Quarterfinals
Giullia Penalber (BRA)	6
Hannah Taylor (CAN)	5
Paula Ramírez (NCA)	0
Jenna Burkert (USA)	10
Lissette Antes (ECU)	4
Alejandra Romero (MEX)	1
Martha Olivares (PER)	5
Nes Marie Rodríguez (PUR)	8

Semifinals
Giullia Penalber (BRA)	0
Jenna Burkert (USA)	11
Lissette Antes (ECU)	13
Nes Marie Rodríguez (PUR)	2

Finals
Jenna Burkert (USA)	1
Lissette Antes (ECU)	2

=== Repechage ===
Bronze medal match
Paula Ramírez (NCA)	2
Giullia Penalber (BRA)	2^{F}
Alejandra Romero (MEX)	3
Nes Marie Rodríguez (PUR)	4
