= Wrestling at the 2022 Commonwealth Games – Women's freestyle 62 kg =

Wrestling competition

Wrestling – Women's freestyle 62 kg at the 2022 Commonwealth Games
- Venue: Coventry Arena
- Dates: 5 August 2022
- Competitors: 8 from 8 nations

Medalists
| gold medal | Sakshi Malik | India |
| silver medal | Ana Godinez | Canada |
| bronze medal | Esther Kolawole | Nigeria |
| bronze medal | Berthe Etane Ngolle | Cameroon |

The Women's freestyle 62 kg wrestling competitions at the 2022 Commonwealth Games in Birmingham, England took place on 5 August at the Coventry Arena. A total of eight competitors from eight nations took part.

This freestyle wrestling competition consists of a single-elimination tournament, with a repechage used to determine the winner of two bronze medals. The two finalists face off for gold and silver medals. Each wrestler who loses to one of the two finalists moves into the repechage, culminating in a pair of bronze medal matches featuring the semifinal losers each facing the remaining repechage opponent from their half of the bracket.

== Results ==
The draw is as follows:

Legend

- F — Won by fall

=== Main bracket ===
| Quarterfinals | | Semifinals | | Final |
| Esther Kolawole (NGR) | 10 |
| Sachini Weraduwage (SRI) | 0 | Esther Kolawole (NGR) | 4 |
| Abbie Fountain (SCO) | 0 | Ana Godinez (CAN) | 10 |
| Ana Godinez (CAN) | 10 | | | Ana Godinez (CAN) | 4 |
| Dola Khatun (BAN) | 0 | | | Sakshi Malik (IND) | 4^{F} |
| Berthe Etane Ngolle (CMR) | 10 | Berthe Etane Ngolle (CMR) | 0 |
| Sakshi Malik (IND) | 10^{F} | Sakshi Malik (IND) | 10 |
| Kelsey Barnes (ENG) | 0 |

=== Repechage ===
Bronze medal matches
Abbie Fountain (SCO) | 0
Esther Kolawole (NGR) | 10
Kelsey Barnes (ENG) | 4
Berthe Etane Ngolle (CMR) | 9
