= Sae Nanjo =

Japanese freestyle wrestler

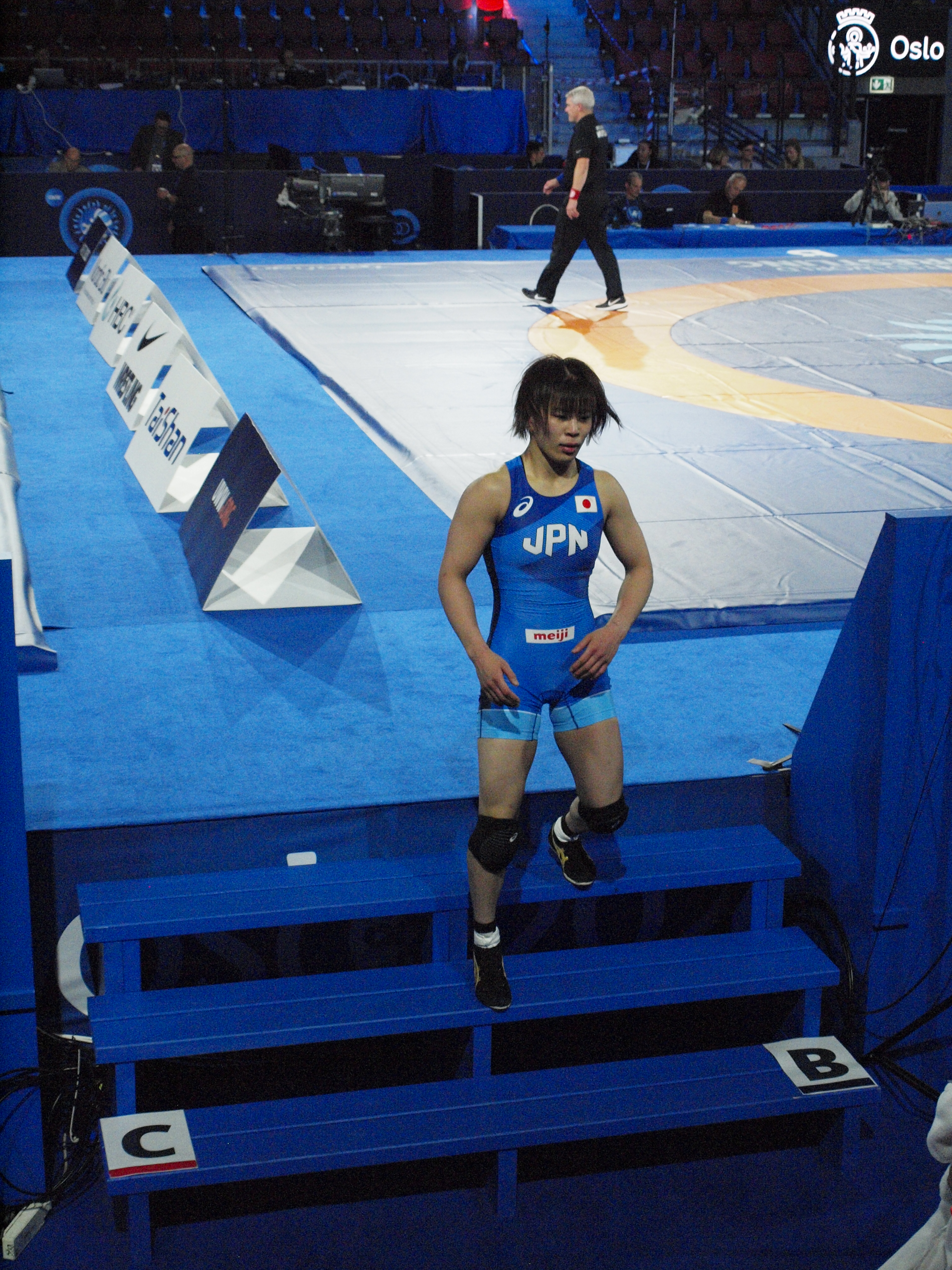
- Sae Nanjo at the 2021 World Wrestling Championships in Oslo, Norway

Personal information
- Nationality: Japan
- Born: 南條早映; 15 July 1999 (age 27) Hyogo, Japan
- Height: 166 cm (5 ft 5 in)

Sport
- Country: Japan
- Sport: Wrestling
- Weight class: 57 kg
- Event: Freestyle
Medal record
Women's freestyle wrestling
Representing Japan
World Championships
Bronze medal – third place	2021 Oslo	57 kg
Asian Championships
Gold medal – first place	2017 New Delhi	55 kg
Gold medal – first place	2023 Astana	57 kg
World U23 Championships
Gold medal – first place	2019 Budapest	57 kg
Gold medal – first place	2022 Pontevedra	57 kg
Golden Grand Prix Ivan Yarygin
Gold medal – first place	2017 Krasnoyarsk	55 kg

Sae Nanjo (南條早映, Nanjo Sae; born 15 July 1999 in Hyogo)is a Japanese freestyle wrestler. She won one of the bronze medals in the women's 57 kg event at the 2021 World Wrestling Championships in Oslo, Norway. In 2017, she won the gold medal in the women's 55 kg event at the Asian Wrestling Championships held in New Delhi, India.

She won the gold medal in women's 57 kg event at the 2022 U23 World Wrestling Championships held in Pontevedra, Spain.

In 2023, she won the gold medal in her event at the Asian Wrestling Championships held in Astana, Kazakhstan.
