= Wrestling at the 2023 Pan American Games – Women's freestyle 57 kg =

Women's freestyle 57 at the 2023 Pan American Games
- Venue: Olympic Training Center in Ñuñoa
- Dates: November 2
- Competitors: 10 from 10 nations

Medalists
Gold medal	Giullia Penalber	Brazil
Silver medal	Hannah Taylor	Canada
Bronze medal	Ángela Álvarez	Cuba
Bronze medal	Luisa Valverde	Ecuador

The women's freestyle 57 kg competition of the Wrestling events at the 2023 Pan American Games in Ñuñoa was held on November 2.

== Qualification ==
The winner of each weight category at the 2021 Junior Pan American Games in Cali, Colombia qualified directly, along with the top four at the 2022 Pan American Wrestling Championships and 2023 Pan American Wrestling Championships. The host country (Chile) is guaranteed a spot in each event, but its athletes must compete in both the 2022 and 2023 Pan American Championship. If Chile does not qualify at any of the first two events, it will take the fourth spot available at the 2023 Pan American Championships. A further six wildcards (four men and two women) will be awarded to nations without any qualified athlete but took part in the qualification tournaments.

== Schedule ==
All times are local (UTC−3)

Date	Time	Event
Wednesday, 2 November 2023	10:00	Round of 16
Wednesday, 2 November 2023	10:00	Quarterfinals
Wednesday, 2 November 2023	11:00	Semifinals
Wednesday, 2 November 2023	17:00	Finals

== Results ==
Legend

- F — Won by fall

=== Main Bracket ===
Round of 16
Ángela Álvarez (CUB)	11
Jacqueline Hernández (ESA)	0
Nes Marie Rodríguez (PUR)	1
Betzabeth Sarco (VEN)	4

Quarterfinals
Susana Lozano (MEX)	0
Ángela Álvarez (CUB)	3
Xochitl Mota-Pettis (USA)	5
Giullia Penalber (BRA)	4^{F}
Luisa Valverde (ECU)	3
Hannah Taylor (CAN)	12^{F}
Betzabeth Sarco (VEN)	10^{F}
Dafne Palacios (CHI)	0

Semifinals
Ángela Álvarez (CUB)	0
Giullia Penalber (BRA)	4^{F}
Hannah Taylor (CAN)	3^{F}
Betzabeth Sarco (VEN)	2

Finals
Giullia Penalber (BRA)	7
Hannah Taylor (CAN)	6

=== Repechage ===
Bronze medal match
Xochitl Mota-Pettis (USA)	0
Ángela Álvarez (CUB)	10
Luisa Valverde (ECU)	6^{F}
Betzabeth Sarco (VEN)	0

== Final standing ==
Rank	Athlete
1st place, gold medalist(s)	Giullia Penalber (BRA)
2nd place, silver medalist(s)	Hannah Taylor (CAN)
3rd place, bronze medalist(s)	Ángela Álvarez (CUB)
3rd place, bronze medalist(s)	Luisa Valverde (ECU)
5	Xochitl Mota-Pettis (USA)
5	Betzabeth Sarco (VEN)
7	Nes Marie Rodríguez (PUR)
8	Susana Lozano (MEX)
9	Dafne Palacios (CHI)
10	Jacqueline Hernández (ESA)
