= Tsugumi Sakurai =

Japanese freestyle wrestler

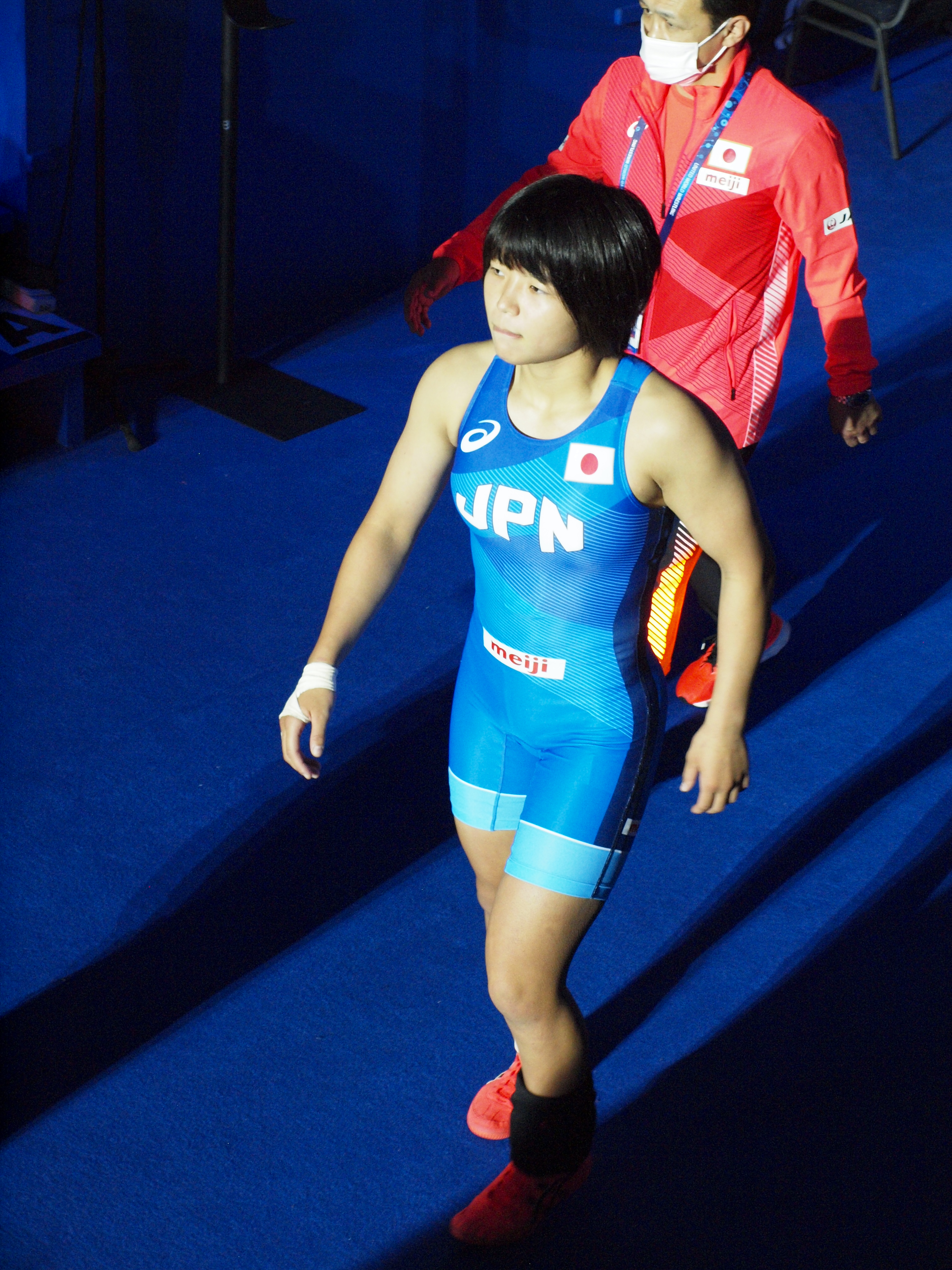
- Sakurai at the 2021 World Wrestling Championships in Oslo, Norway

Personal information
- Born: 櫻井つぐみ; 3 September 2001 (age 24) Kochi, Japan
- Height: 155 cm (5 ft 1 in)

Sport
- Country: Japan
- Sport: Amateur wrestling
- Weight class: 57 kg
- Event: Freestyle
Medal record
Women's freestyle wrestling
Representing Japan
Olympic Games
Gold medal – first place	2024 Paris	57 kg
World Championships
Gold medal – first place	2021 Oslo	55 kg
Gold medal – first place	2022 Belgrade	57 kg
Gold medal – first place	2023 Belgrade	57 kg
Asian Games
Gold medal – first place	2022 Hangzhou	57 kg
Asian Championships
Gold medal – first place	2022 Ulaanbaatar	57 kg
Silver medal – second place	2024 Bishkek	57 kg

Tsugumi Sakurai (born 3 September 2001) is a retired Japanese freestyle wrestler. She won the gold medal in the women's 57 kg event at the 2024 Summer Olympics in Paris, France. She is a three-time gold medalist at the World Wrestling Championships (2021, 2022, and 2023). Sakurai also won the gold medal in her event at the 2022 Asian Wrestling Championships held in Ulaanbaatar, Mongolia.

== Career ==
Sakurai won the gold medal in the women's 55 kg event at the 2021 World Wrestling Championships held in Oslo, Norway. She also won the gold medal in her event at the 2022 Asian Wrestling Championships held in Ulaanbaatar, Mongolia.

Sakurai won the gold medal in the women's 57 kg event at the 2022 World Wrestling Championships held in Belgrade, Serbia. A year later, she also won the gold medal in the women's 57 kg event at the 2023 World Wrestling Championships held in Belgrade, Serbia. As a result, she earned a quota place for Japan for the 2024 Summer Olympics in Paris, France. In October 2023, Sakurai won the gold medal in the women's 57 kg event at the 2022 Asian Games held in Hangzhou, China. She defeated Jong In-sun of North Korea in her gold medal match.

She won the gold medal in the women's 57 kg event at the 2024 Summer Olympics in Paris, France. She defeated Anastasia Nichita of Moldova in the final.

Sakurai announced her retirement at the age of 24 in April 2026, deciding to redirect her focus to coaching and serving as a goodwill ambassador of sports in her home prefecture of Kochi.

== Achievements ==
Year	Tournament	Location	Result	Event
2021	World Championships	Oslo, Norway	1st	Freestyle 55 kg
2022	Asian Championships	Ulaanbaatar, Mongolia	1st	Freestyle 57 kg
2022	World Championships	Belgrade, Serbia	1st	Freestyle 57 kg
2023	World Championships	Belgrade, Serbia	1st	Freestyle 57 kg
2023	Asian Games	Hangzhou, China	1st	Freestyle 57 kg
2024	Asian Championships	Bishkek, Kyrgyzstan	2nd	Freestyle 57 kg
2024	Summer Olympics	Paris, France	1st	Freestyle 57 kg
