= 2022 U23 World Wrestling Championships – Women's freestyle 57 kg =

Wrestling competitions

Women's freestyle 57 kg at the 2022 U23 World Championships
- Venue: Pontevedra Municipal Sports Hall
- Dates: 20–21 October
- Competitors: 14 from 14 nations

Medalists
gold medal	Sae Nanjo	Japan
silver medal	Patrycja Gil	Poland
bronze medal	Alina Hrushyna	Ukraine
bronze medal	Alexandra Hedrick	United States

The women's freestyle 57 kilograms is a competition featured at the 2022 U23 World Wrestling Championships, and was held in Pontevedra, Spain on 20 and 21 October 2022. The qualification rounds were held on 19 October while medal matches were held on the 2nd day of the competition. A total of 14 wrestlers competed in this event, limited to athletes whose body weight was less than 57 kilograms.

This freestyle wrestling competition consists of a single-elimination tournament, with a repechage used to determine the winner of two bronze medals. The two finalists face off for gold and silver medals. Each wrestler who loses to one of the two finalists moves into the repechage, culminating in a pair of bronze medal matches featuring the semifinal losers each facing the remaining repechage opponent from their half of the bracket.

== Results ==
Legend

- F — Won by fall
- WO — Won by walkover

=== Main bracket ===
Round of 16
Susana Lozano (MEX)	5
Siwar Bouseta (TUN)	6
Sae Nanjo (JPN)	6^{F}
Victoria Báez-Dilone (ESP)	0
Othelie Høie (NOR)	0
Alina Hrushyna (UKR)	4^{F}
Alexandra Hedrick (USA)	11^{F}
Melda Dernekçi (TUR)	0
Welvina Vemba (ANG)	0
Patrycja Gil (POL)	10
Sezen Belberova (BUL)	8
Kirti Saxena (CAN)	0

Quarterfinals
Céleste Sion (FRA)	0
Siwar Bouseta (TUN)	7
Sae Nanjo (JPN)	10
Alina Hrushyna (UKR)	0
Alexandra Hedrick (USA)	6
Patrycja Gil (POL)	9
Sezen Belberova (BUL)	2
Laura Almaganbetova (KAZ)	9

Semifinals
Siwar Bouseta (TUN)	0
Sae Nanjo (JPN)	6^{F}
Patrycja Gil (POL)	5^{F}
Laura Almaganbetova (KAZ)	1

Final
Sae Nanjo (JPN)	13
Patrycja Gil (POL)	1

=== Repechage ===
Repechage round
Victoria Báez-Dilone (ESP)	0
Alina Hrushyna (UKR)	7^{F}
~~Welvina Vemba (ANG)~~
Alexandra Hedrick (USA)	WO

Bronze medals
Alina Hrushyna (UKR)	9^{F}
Siwar Bouseta (TUN)	2
Alexandra Hedrick (USA)	13
Laura Almaganbetova (KAZ)	2

== Final standing ==
Rank	Athlete
1st place, gold medalist(s)	Sae Nanjo (JPN)
2nd place, silver medalist(s)	Patrycja Gil (POL)
3rd place, bronze medalist(s)	Alina Hrushyna (UKR)
3rd place, bronze medalist(s)	Alexandra Hedrick (USA)
5	Siwar Bouseta (TUN)
5	Laura Almaganbetova (KAZ)
7	Sezen Belberova (BUL)
8	Susana Lozano (MEX)
9	Othelie Høie (NOR)
10	Céleste Sion (FRA)
11	Kirti Saxena (CAN)
12	Melda Dernekçi (TUR)
13	Victoria Báez-Dilone (ESP)
—	Welvina Vemba (ANG)
