= 2020 European Wrestling Championships – Women's freestyle 57 kg =

Competition at the 2020 European Wrestling Championships

The women's freestyle 57 kg is a competition featured at the 2020 European Wrestling Championships, and was held in Rome, Italy on February 13 and February 14.

== Medalists ==
Gold	Grace Bullen; Norway
Silver	Alina Akobiia; Ukraine
Bronze	Iryna Kurachkina; Belarus
Bronze	Johanna Lindborg; Sweden

== Results ==
Legend

- F — Won by fall

1/8 finals
Mehlika Öztürk (TUR)	2
Tanya Teneva (BUL)	1
Victoria Báez-Dilone (ESP)	6
Marina Simonyan (RUS)	9
Lenka Hocková (CZE)	2
Johanna Lindborg (SWE)	8
Alina Akobiia (UKR)	7^{F}
Arianna Carieri (ITA)	0

Quarterfinals
Grace Bullen (NOR)	5^{F}
Alyona Kolesnik (AZE)	0
Iryna Kurachkina (BLR)	11
Magdalena Głodek (POL)	0
Mehlika Öztürk (TUR)	3
Marina Simonyan (RUS)	13
Johanna Lindborg (SWE)	0
Alina Akobiia (UKR)	6^{F}

Semifinals
Grace Bullen (NOR)	2
Iryna Kurachkina (BLR)	0
Marina Simonyan (RUS)	3
Alina Akobiia (UKR)	8^{F}

Final
Grace Bullen (NOR)	6
Alina Akobiia (UKR)	1

Repechage round 1
Arianna Carieri (ITA)	4
Johanna Lindborg (SWE)	9

Bronze medal match
Alyona Kolesnik (AZE)	1
Iryna Kurachkina (BLR)	4
Johanna Lindborg (SWE)	7
Marina Simonyan (RUS)	4

== Final standing ==
Rank	Athlete
1st place, gold medalist(s)	Grace Bullen (NOR)
2nd place, silver medalist(s)	Alina Akobiia (UKR)
3rd place, bronze medalist(s)	Iryna Kurachkina (BLR)
3rd place, bronze medalist(s)	Johanna Lindborg (SWE)
5	Alyona Kolesnik (AZE)
5	Marina Simonyan (RUS)
7	Mehlika Öztürk (TUR)
8	Victoria Báez-Dilone (ESP)
9	Arianna Carieri (ITA)
10	Lenka Hocková (CZE)
11	Tanya Teneva (BUL)
12	Magdalena Głodek (POL)
