= Alina Hrushyna =

Ukrainian freestyle wrestler

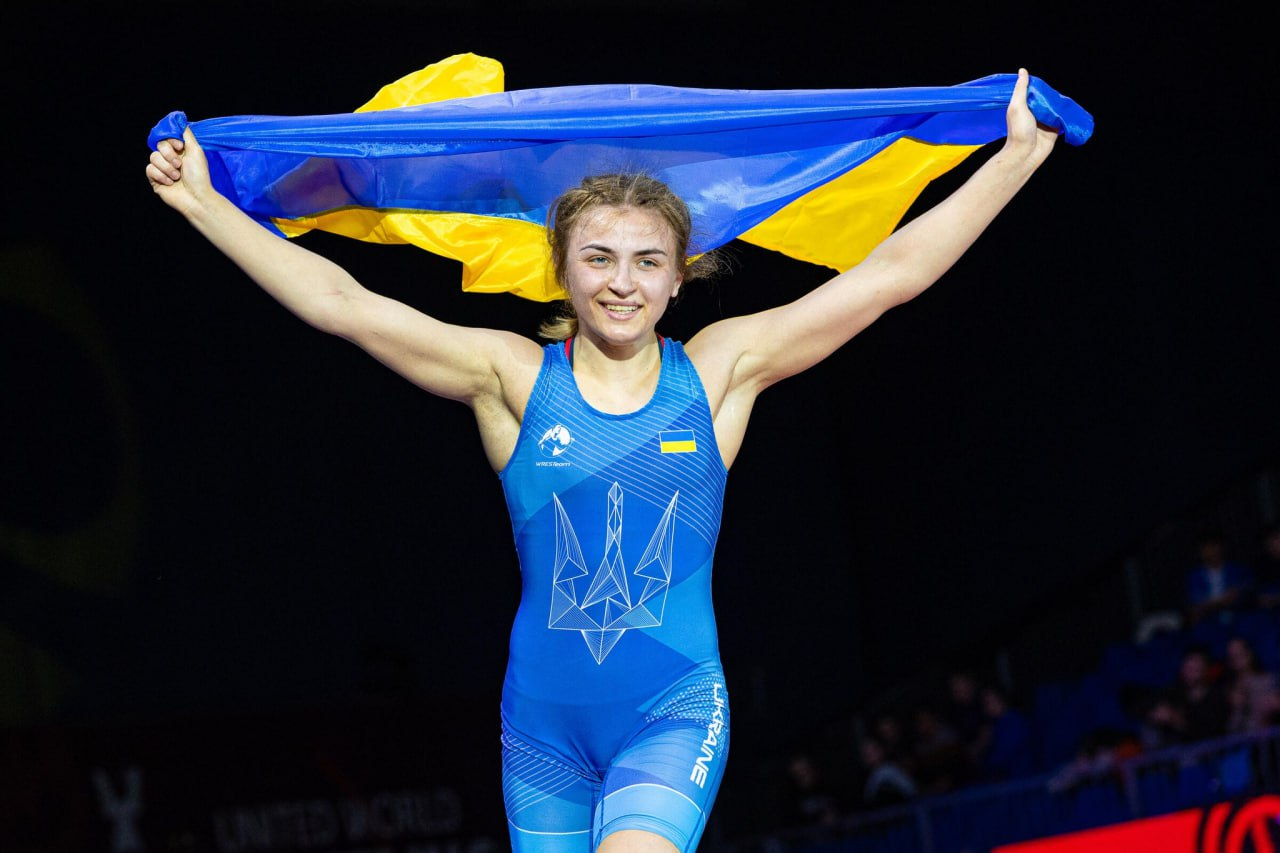
- Hrushyna in 2023

Personal information
- Native name: Аліна Давидівна Акобія
- Full name: Alina Hrushyna Akobiia
- Born: 5 August 1999 (age 26)

Sport
- Country: Ukraine
- Sport: Amateur wrestling
- Weight class: 57 kg
- Event: Freestyle
Medal record
Women's freestyle wrestling
Representing Ukraine
World Championships
Bronze medal – third place	2022 Belgrade	57 kg
European Championships
Gold medal – first place	2022 Budapest	57 kg
Gold medal – first place	2023 Zagreb	57 kg
Silver medal – second place	2020 Rome	57 kg
Bronze medal – third place	2021 Warsaw	57 kg
World U23 Championships
Gold medal – first place	2021 Belgrade	57 kg
Silver medal – second place	2019 Budapest	57 kg
Bronze medal – third place	2017 Bydgoszcz	55 kg
Bronze medal – third place	2022 Pontevedra	57 kg
European U23 Championship
Gold medal – first place	2021 Skopje	57 kg
Silver medal – second place	2018 Istanbul	57 kg
Silver medal – second place	2019 Novi Sad	57 kg

Alina Hrushyna Akobiia (Ukrainian: Аліна Давидівна Акобія, born 5 August 1999), also known as Alina Akobiya, is a Ukrainian freestyle wrestler. She won one of the bronze medals in the 57 kg event at the 2022 World Wrestling Championships held in Belgrade, Serbia. She is a four-time medalist, including two gold medals, at the European Wrestling Championships. Hrushyna represented Ukraine at the 2024 Summer Olympics in Paris, France.

== Career ==
In 2019, at the World U23 Wrestling Championship in Budapest, Hungary, she won the silver medal in the 57 kg event. Two years earlier, at the 2017 World U23 Wrestling Championship held in Bydgoszcz, Poland, she won one of the bronze medals in the 55 kg event.

At the 2020 European Wrestling Championships held in Rome, Italy, she won the silver medal in the women's 57 kg event. In the final, she lost against Grace Bullen of Norway.

In March 2021, Hrushyna earned a spot in the women's 57 kg event at the European Qualification Tournament for a Ukrainian wrestler to compete at the 2020 Summer Olympics in Tokyo, Japan. Tetyana Kit competed in the women's 57 kg event.

In May 2021, Hrushyna won the gold medal in her event at the European U23 Wrestling Championship held in Skopje, North Macedonia. In November 2021, she also won the gold medal in the 57 kg event at the 2021 U23 World Wrestling Championships held in Belgrade, Serbia.

In 2022, Hrushyna won the gold medal in the 57 kg event at the 2022 European Wrestling Championships held in Budapest, Hungary. She also won the gold medal in her event at the Matteo Pellicone Ranking Series 2022 held in Rome, Italy. She won one of the bronze medals in the 57 kg event at the 2022 World Wrestling Championships held in Belgrade, Serbia. A month later, she also won one of the bronze medals in her event at the 2022 U23 World Wrestling Championships held in Pontevedra, Spain.

Hrushyna won the silver medal in her event at the 2023 Ibrahim Moustafa Tournament held in Alexandria, Egypt. She won the gold medal in the 57 kg event at the 2023 European Wrestling Championships held in Zagreb, Croatia. She defeated Zhala Aliyeva of Azerbaijan in her gold medal match.

Hrushyna competed at the 2024 European Wrestling Olympic Qualification Tournament in Baku, Azerbaijan hoping to qualify for the 2024 Summer Olympics in Paris, France. She was eliminated in her third match and she did not qualify for the Olympics. She also competed at the 2024 World Wrestling Olympic Qualification Tournament in Istanbul, Turkey without qualifying for the Olympics. Hrushyna was able to compete at the Olympics as Iryna Kurachkina of Belarus was not invited to compete. Hrushyna competed in the women's 57 kg event where she was eliminated in her second match by Helen Maroulis of the United States. Maroulis went on to win one of the bronze medals in the event.

== Personal life ==
Hrushyna is married to Greco-Roman wrestler Oleksandr Hrushyn.

== Achievements ==
Year	Tournament	Location	Result	Event
2020	European Championships	Rome, Italy	2nd	Freestyle 57 kg
2021	European Championships	Warsaw, Poland	3rd	Freestyle 57 kg
2022	European Championships	Budapest, Hungary	1st	Freestyle 57 kg
2022	World Championships	Belgrade, Serbia	3rd	Freestyle 57 kg
2023	European Championships	Zagreb, Croatia	1st	Freestyle 57 kg
