= Siwar Bousetta =

Tunisian freestyle wrestler

Personal information
- Nationality: Tunisian
- Born: 23 July 1999 (age 27)

Sport
- Country: Tunisia
- Sport: Amateur wrestling
- Weight class: 57 kg
- Event: Freestyle
Medal record
Women's freestyle wrestling
Representing Tunisia
African Games
Bronze medal – third place	2019 Rabat	57 kg
African Championships
Gold medal – first place	2023 Hammamet	59 kg
Silver medal – second place	2022 El Jadida	59 kg
Bronze medal – third place	2020 Algiers	57 kg
Mediterranean Games
Silver medal – second place	2022 Oran	57 kg

Siwar Bousetta (سوار بوستّة, born 23 July 1999), also spelled Bouseta, is a Tunisian freestyle wrestler. She is a bronze medalist at the African Games and a three-time medalist, including gold, at the African Wrestling Championships. She represented Tunisia at the 2020 Summer Olympics in Tokyo, Japan and 2024 Summer Olympics in Paris, France.

== Career ==
She represented Tunisia at the 2019 African Games held in Rabat, Morocco and she won one of the bronze medals in the women's freestyle 57 kg event.

At the 2020 African Wrestling Championships held in Algiers, Algeria, she won one of the bronze medals in the women's 57 kg event. She qualified at the 2021 African & Oceania Wrestling Olympic Qualification Tournament to represent Tunisia at the 2020 Summer Olympics in Tokyo, Japan. She competed in the women's 57 kg event where she was eliminated in her first match by Tetyana Kit of Ukraine.

She won the silver medal in her event at the 2022 African Wrestling Championships held in El Jadida, Morocco. A few months later, she also won the silver medal in the 57 kg event at the 2022 Mediterranean Games held in Oran, Algeria. She won the bronze medal in her event at the 2022 Tunis Ranking Series event held in Tunis, Tunisia. She competed in the 57 kg event at the 2021 Islamic Solidarity Games held in Konya, Turkey. A few months later, she lost her bronze medal match in her event at the 2022 U23 World Wrestling Championships held in Pontevedra, Spain.

She won the gold medal in her event at the 2023 African Wrestling Championships held in Hammamet, Tunisia.

She competed in the women's 62 kg event at the 2024 Summer Olympics in Paris, France.

== Achievements ==
Year	Tournament	Location	Result	Event
2019	African Games	Rabat, Morocco	3rd	Freestyle 57 kg
2020	African Wrestling Championships	Algiers, Algeria	3rd	Freestyle 57 kg
2022	African Wrestling Championships	El Jadida, Morocco	2nd	Freestyle 59 kg
2022	Mediterranean Games	Oran, Algeria	2nd	Freestyle 57 kg
2023	African Wrestling Championships	Hammamet, Tunisia	1st	Freestyle 59 kg
