= Esther Kolawole =

Nigerian wrestler (born 2002)

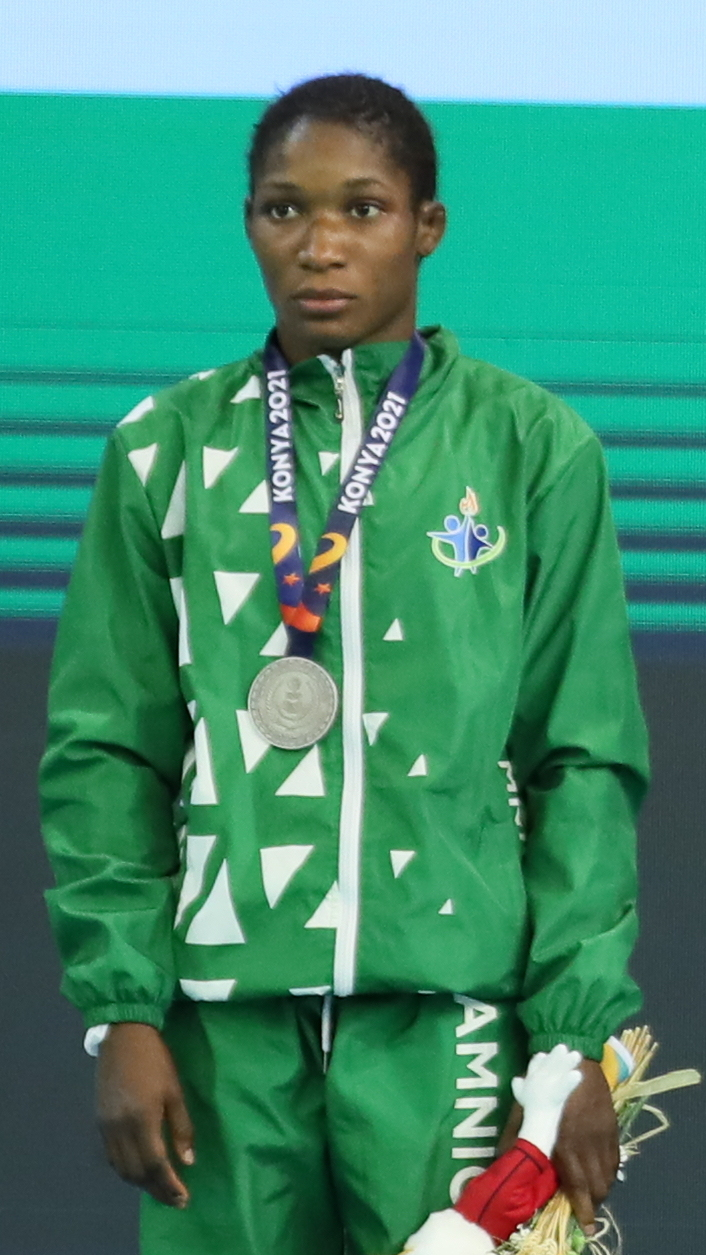
- Kolawole at the 2021 Islamic Solidarity Games in Konya, Turkey

Personal information
- Full name: Esther Omolayo Kolawole
- Born: 4 January 2002 (age 24) Akure, Nigeria
- Education: William Penn University

Sport
- Country: Nigeria
- Sport: Amateur wrestling
- Event: Freestyle
- University team: William Penn University
- League: NAIA
Medal record
Women's freestyle wrestling
Representing Nigeria
African Championships
Gold medal – first place	2020 Algiers	55 kg
Gold medal – first place	2024 Alexandria	62 kg
Gold medal – first place	2025 Casablanca	62 kg
Silver medal – second place	2023 Hammamet	62 kg
African Games
Gold medal – first place	2023 Accra	62 kg
Islamic Solidarity Games
Gold medal – first place	2025 Riyadh	62 kg
Silver medal – second place	2021 Konya	57 kg
Commonwealth Games
Bronze medal – third place	2022 Birmingham	62 kg
World U23 Championships
Bronze medal – third place	2021 Belgrade	57 kg
Bronze medal – third place	2024 Tirana	62 kg
Bronze medal – third place	2025 Novi Sad	62 kg

Esther Omolayo Kolawole (born 4 January 2002) is a Nigerian wrestler. She represents Nigeria at international competitions. In August 2022, she won bronze in the women's 62 kg event at the 2022 Commonwealth Games held in Birmingham, England. Kolawole represented Nigeria at the 2024 Summer Olympics in Paris, France.

== Career ==
Kolawale won the gold medal at the 2018 African Youth Games. In December 2018, she became a national wrestling champion, winning the gold medal for the 55 kg freestyle at the Nigerian National Sports Festival.

In February 2018, Kolawole won gold for the 61 kg cadet event during the 2018 African Wrestling Championships.

Kolawole won the gold medal in her event at the 2020 African Wrestling Championships held in Algiers, Algeria. In May 2021, she failed to qualify for the 2020 Summer Olympics at the World Olympic Qualification Tournament held in Sofia, Bulgaria. In October 2021, Kolawole competed in the women's 55 kg event at the World Wrestling Championships held in Oslo, Norway where she was eliminated in her second match.

In November 2021, she placed third and won one of the bronze medal in the women's 57 kg freestyle at the 2021 U23 World Wrestling Championships held in Belgrade, Serbia.

In 2022, Kolawole lost her bronze medal match in the women's 57 kg event at the Yasar Dogu Tournament held in Istanbul, Turkey. She won bronze in the women's 62 kg event at the 2022 Commonwealth Games held in Birmingham, England. Kolawole won the silver medal in the women's 57 kg event at the 2021 Islamic Solidarity Games held in Konya, Turkey. She competed in the women's 57 kg event at the 2022 World Wrestling Championships held in Belgrade, Serbia.

She won one of the bronze medals in the women's 62 kg event at the Grand Prix de France Henri Deglane 2023 held in Nice, France. A few months later, she won the silver medal in her event at the 2023 African Wrestling Championships held in Hammamet, Tunisia.

Kolawole competed in the women's 62 kg event at the 2024 Summer Olympics in Paris, France. She was eliminated in her first match by Aisuluu Tynybekova of Kyrgyzstan.

== Education ==
As of 2025, Kolawole attends and also competes for William Penn University in Oskaloosa, Iowa, USA.

She was a finalist for the 2025 Anthony-Maroulis Trophy.

== Achievements ==
Year	Tournament	Location	Result	Event
2020	African Wrestling Championships	Algiers, Algeria	1st	Freestyle 55 kg
2021	World U23 Championships	Belgrade, Serbia	3rd	Freestyle 57 kg
2022	Commonwealth Games	Birmingham, England	3rd	Freestyle 62 kg
2022	Islamic Solidarity Games	Konya, Turkey	2nd	Freestyle 57 kg
2023	African Wrestling Championships	Hammamet, Tunisia	2nd	Freestyle 62 kg
2024	African Wrestling Championships	Alexandria, Egypt	1st	Freestyle 62 kg
