= Laylokhon Sobirova =

Uzbekistani freestyle wrestler

Personal information
- Native name: Layloxon Sobirova
- Born: 23 February 2003 (age 23) Uzbekistan
- Height: 1.65 m (5 ft 5 in)
- Weight: 57 kg (126 lb; 9.0 st)

Sport
- Country: Uzbekistan
- Sport: Women's freestyle wrestling
- Event: 57 kg
Medal record
Women's freestyle wrestling
Representing Uzbekistan
Asian Championships
Silver medal – second place	2023 Astana	57 kg
Asian Games
Bronze medal – third place	2022 Hangzhou	57 kg
Grand Prix
Bronze medal – third place	2022 Almaty	57 kg
Asian Juniors Championships
Gold medal – first place	2022 Manama	57 kg
Asian Cadets Championships
Silver medal – second place	2019 Nur-Sultan	61 kg

Laylokhon Sobirova (born 28 February 2003) is an Uzbekistani freestyle wrestler competing in the 57 kg division.

== Career ==
Third place in the 57 kg category at the 2022 Bolat Turlykhanov event. Bronze medalist of the 2022 Asian Games. 2023 Asian runner-up. 2022 Asian Junior champion.

In 2023, she competed in the women's 57 kg event at the Wrestling at the 2022 Asian Games held in Hangzhou, China and won one of bronze medals.

Sobirova competed at the 2024 Asian Wrestling Olympic Qualification Tournament in Bishkek, Kyrgyzstan hoping to qualify for the 2024 Summer Olympics in Paris, France. She was eliminated in her second match and she did not qualify for the Olympics. Sobirova also competed at the 2024 World Wrestling Olympic Qualification Tournament held in Istanbul, Turkey without qualifying for the Olympics. In January 2025, she was runner-up at the Ivan Yarygin cup in Krasnoyarsk, Russia

== Achievements ==
Year	Tournament	Location	Result	Event
2023	Asian Games	Hangzhou, China	3rd	Freestyle 57 kg
2023	Asian Championships	Ulaanbaatar, Mongolia	2nd	Freestyle 57 kg
