= Hannah Taylor =

Canadian freestyle wrestler (born 1998)

Personal information
- Full name: Hannah Fay Taylor
- Nickname: Hannah Faytay
- Born: 30 April 1998 (age 28) Charlottetown, Prince Edward Island, Canada
- Home town: Summerside, Prince Edward Island, Canada
- Education: Brock University
- Occupation: Amateur wrestler
- Years active: 2013-present
- Height: 157 cm (5 ft 2 in)
- Weight: 57 kg (126 lb)

Sport
- Country: Canada
- Sport: Wrestling
- Weight class: 57kg, 63kg
- Event: Freestyle
- University team: Brock University
- Club: Brock Wrestling Club
Medal record
Women's freestyle wrestling
Representing Canada
Pan American Games
Silver medal – second place	2023 Santiago	57 kg
Commonwealth Games
Bronze medal – third place	2022 Birmingham	57 kg
Pan American Wrestling Championships
Silver medal – second place	2019 Buenos Aires	57 kg
Silver medal – second place	2020 Ottawa	57 kg
World U23 Wrestling Championships
Bronze medal – third place	2019 Budapest	57 kg
Bronze medal – third place	2021 Belgrade	57 kg

Hannah Fay Taylor (born 30 April 1998) is a Canadian freestyle wrestler. Taylor competed for Canada at the 2019 Pan American Games, and at the Pan American Wrestling Championships she won the silver medal in 2019 and 2020. She won one of the bronze medals in the women's 57 kg event at the 2022 Commonwealth Games held in Birmingham, England. She is a member of the women's wrestling team at Brock University in St. Catharines, Ontario.

== Personal life ==
Taylor was born in Charlottetown, Prince Edward Island and grew up in Summerside, Prince Edward Island. She lives in the Niagara Region and studies sport management at Brock University.

She graduated from Three Oaks Senior High School in Summerside.

== Career ==
In 2013, Taylor competed for Prince Edward Island (PEI) in wrestling at the 2013 Canada Summer Games and won a silver medal; she was the flag-bearer for the province at the opening ceremonies of the games. She later represented PEI in the sport of judo at the 2015 Canada Winter Games, due to being unable to find a training partner for wrestling in her weight class.

She competes for Canada in the 57 kg weight class and for the Brock University Badgers in the 63 kg weight class (previously in the 59 kg weight class).

In late 2019, she was defeated by Linda Morais in the 57 kg finals of the Canadian Wrestling Trials, thereby failing to secure an entry into the Pan-Am Olympic Qualification Tournament in Ottawa.

=== U SPORTS ===
In 2017, she was named the rookie of the year by U SPORTS and in the same year, claimed a gold medal at the Ontario University Athletics (OUA) wrestling championships. From 2016–2017 to 2019–2020, she won a gold medal three times at the national level (U SPORTS Wrestling Championships) and four times at the provincial level (OUA Wrestling Championships).

=== International competitions ===
In 2019, Taylor represented Canada at the 2019 Pan American Games held in Lima, Peru in the 57 kg event where she was eliminated in her first match by Giullia Penalber of Brazil. Penalber won one of the bronze medals. Later that year, Taylor competed in the 57 kg event at the 2019 World Wrestling Championships where she was eliminated in her first match by Jong In-sun of North Korea. In 2019, she also competed at the 2019 World U23 Wrestling Championship where she won one of the bronze medals in the 57 kg event. Two years later, she won one of the bronze medals in the 57 kg event at the 2021 U23 World Wrestling Championships held in Belgrade, Serbia.

Taylor won one of the bronze medals in the women's 57 kg event at the 2022 Commonwealth Games held in Birmingham, England. She competed in the 57 kg event at the 2022 World Wrestling Championships held in Belgrade, Serbia. Taylor won the silver medal in the women's 57 kg event at the 2023 Pan American Games held in Santiago, Chile.

In 2024, at the Pan American Wrestling Olympic Qualification Tournament held in Acapulco, Mexico she earned a quota place for Canada for the 2024 Summer Olympics held in Paris. She lost her bronze medal match in the women's 57 kg event at the Olympics.

== Achievements ==
Year	Tournament	Location	Result	Event
2019	Pan American Wrestling Championships	Buenos Aires, Argentina	2nd	Freestyle 57 kg
2020	Pan American Wrestling Championships	Ottawa, Canada	2nd	Freestyle 57 kg
2022	Commonwealth Games	Birmingham, England	3rd	Freestyle 57 kg
2023	Pan American Games	Santiago, Chile	2nd	Freestyle 57 kg
