= Giullia Penalber =

Brazilian freestyle wrestler

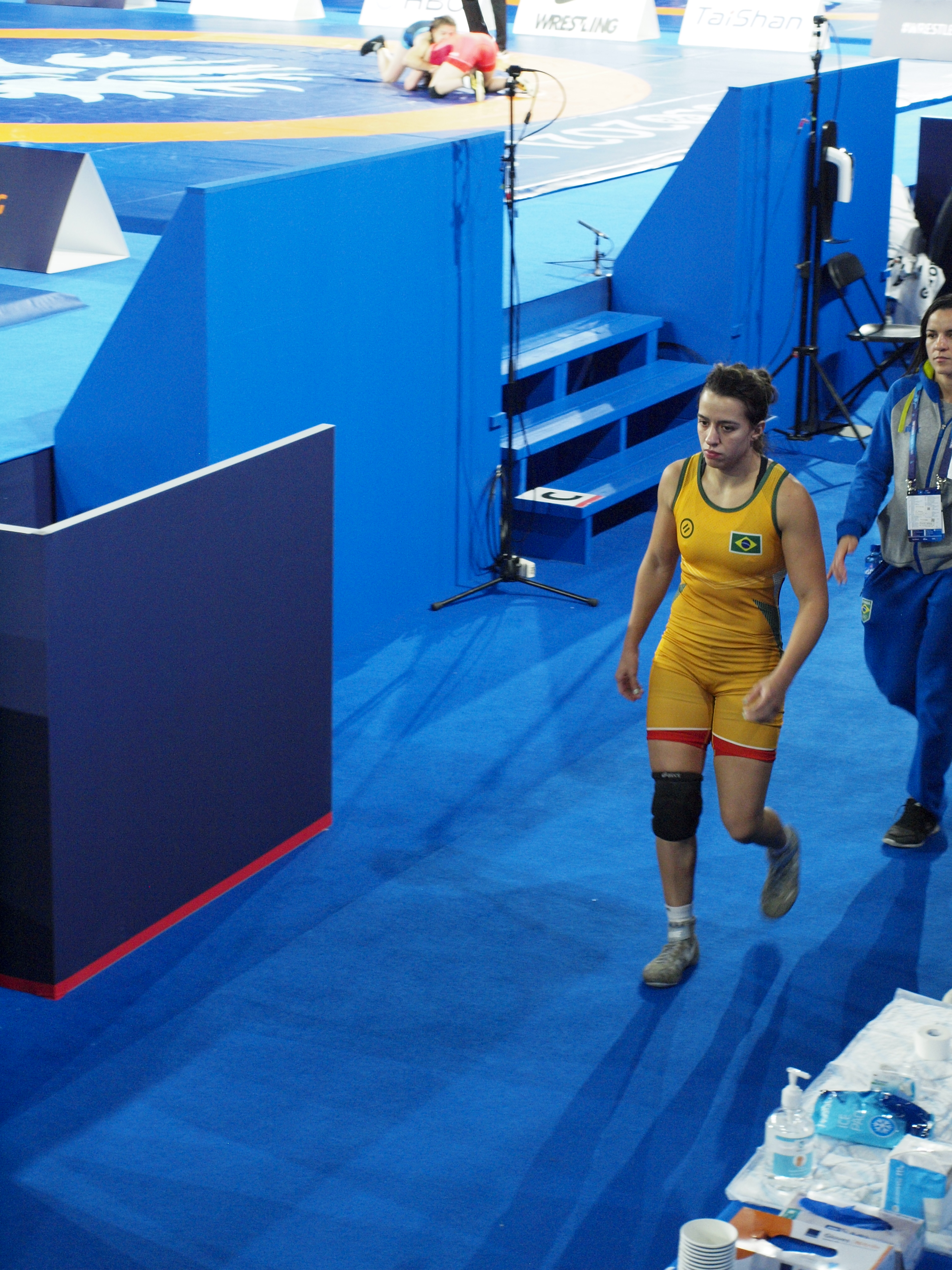
- Penalber at the 2021 World Wrestling Championships in Oslo, Norway

Personal information
- Full name: Giullia Rodrigues Penalber de Oliveira
- Born: 13 April 1992 (age 34) Rio de Janeiro, RJ
- Height: 162 cm (5 ft 4 in)

Sport
- Country: Brazil
- Sport: Amateur wrestling
- Weight class: 57 kg
- Event: Freestyle
Medal record
Women's freestyle wrestling
Representing Brazil
Pan American Games
Gold medal – first place	2023 Santiago	57 kg
Bronze medal – third place	2019 Lima	57 kg
Pan American Championships
Gold medal – first place	2020 Ottawa	57 kg
Gold medal – first place	2021 Guatemala City	57 kg
Silver medal – second place	2016 Frisco	55 kg
Silver medal – second place	2023 Buenos Aires	57 kg
Silver medal – second place	2024 Acapulco	57 kg
Bronze medal – third place	2015 Santiago	53 kg
Bronze medal – third place	2022 Acapulco	57 kg
South American Games
Gold medal – first place	2018 Cochabamba	57 kg
Silver medal – second place	2022 Asunción	57 kg

Giullia Rodrigues Penalber de Oliveira (born 13 April 1992) is a Brazilian freestyle wrestler. She is the gold medalist in the women's 57 kg event at the 2023 Pan American Games and the 2018 South American Games. She is also a two-time gold medalist in this event at the Pan American Wrestling Championships, reached the quarterfinals three times in the World Wrestling Championships, in the 2014, 2019 and 2021 editions, and finished 5th at the 2024 Olympic Games.

== Career ==
Penalber competed in the 55 kg event at the 2014 World Wrestling Championships held in Tashkent, Uzbekistan where she reached the quarterfinals. The following year, she competed in the 53 kg event where she was eliminated in her first match by Lilya Horishna of Ukraine. In 2018, she competed in the 57 kg event where she was eliminated in her second match by Grace Bullen of Norway. In 2019, she reached the quarterfinals in the 57 kg event.

Penalber competed at several editions of the Pan American Games. In 2015, she represented Brazil without winning a medal and, at the 2019 Pan American Games in Lima, Peru, she won one of the bronze medals in the 57 kg event.

In 2018, Penalber won the gold medal in the 57 kg event at the South American Games held in Cochabamba, Bolivia. At the 2020 Pan American Wrestling Championships held in Ottawa, Canada, she won the gold medal in the 57 kg event. She also competed in the 2020 Pan American Wrestling Olympic Qualification Tournament, also held in Ottawa, Canada, without qualifying for the 2020 Summer Olympics in Tokyo, Japan. She won one match and lost two matches and she did not advance to the semi-finals.

In March 2021, Penalber won the gold medal in the 57 kg event at the Matteo Pellicone Ranking Series 2021 held in Rome, Italy. She won the silver medal in her event at the 2021 Dan Kolov & Nikola Petrov Tournament held in Plovdiv, Bulgaria. In May 2021, she failed to qualify for the Olympics at the World Olympic Qualification Tournament held in Sofia, Bulgaria. She won her first two matches but she then lost her match in the semi-finals against Mathilde Rivière of France. At the end of that same month, she won the gold medal in the women's 57 kg event at the 2021 Pan American Wrestling Championships held in Guatemala City, Guatemala. In October 2021, she was eliminated in her second match in the women's 57 kg event at the World Wrestling Championships in Oslo, Norway.

In 2022, Penalber competed in the 57 kg event at the Yasar Dogu Tournament held in Istanbul, Turkey. She won one of the bronze medals in her event at the 2022 Pan American Wrestling Championships held in Acapulco, Mexico. A month later, Penalber also won one of the bronze medals in her event at the Matteo Pellicone Ranking Series 2022 held in Rome, Italy. She won the gold medal in her event at the 2022 Tunis Ranking Series event held in Tunis, Tunisia.

She was eliminated in her first match in the 57 kg event at the 2022 World Wrestling Championships held in Belgrade, Serbia. She won the silver medal in her event at the 2022 South American Games held in Asunción, Paraguay.

Penalber won the gold medal in the women's 57 kg event at the 2023 Pan American Games held in Santiago, Chile. She defeated Hannah Taylor of Canada in her gold medal match.

In 2024, Penalber won the silver medal in her event at the Pan American Wrestling Championships held in Acapulco, Mexico. A few days later, she competed at the 2024 Pan American Wrestling Olympic Qualification Tournament held in Acapulco, Mexico hoping to qualify for the 2024 Summer Olympics in Paris, France. She was eliminated in her first match. Penalber also competed at the 2024 World Wrestling Olympic Qualification Tournament held in Istanbul, Turkey and she earned a quota place for Brazil for the 2024 Summer Olympics.

At the 2024 Olympic Games in Paris, being ranked 11th in the world, she entered as the tournament's No. 7 seed. She beat Rckaela Aquino, from Guam, in the first round, but in the quarterfinals, she faced Moldovan Anastasia Nichita, who was the 2022 world champion, 2023 world runner-up and current No. 2 in the world, losing 5–0, and was awaiting the possibility of a repechage. After the Moldovan qualified for the final, Penalber entered the repechage, where she would face the German Sandra Paruszewski, two-time bronze medalist at the European Championships. Penalber won the fight and became the first Brazilian in history to reach a medal match in Olympic Wrestling. She lost to China's Kexin Hong in the bronze medal match, but finished in 5th place, the best placement in the country's history in the sport.

== Personal life ==
Judoka Victor Penalber is her brother.

Before switching to wrestling, she also competed in judo and she won medals at several events, including the 2009 Pan American U20 Championships and the 2012 Brazilian U23 Championships.

== Achievements ==
Year	Tournament	Location	Result	Event
2015	Pan American Wrestling Championships	Santiago, Chile	3rd	Freestyle 53 kg
2016	Pan American Wrestling Championships	Frisco, United States	2nd	Freestyle 55 kg
2018	South American Games	Cochabamba, Bolivia	1st	Freestyle 57 kg
2019	Pan American Games	Lima, Peru	3rd	Freestyle 57 kg
2020	Pan American Wrestling Championships	Ottawa, Canada	1st	Freestyle 57 kg
2021	Pan American Wrestling Championships	Guatemala City, Guatemala	1st	Freestyle 57 kg
2022	Pan American Wrestling Championships	Acapulco, Mexico	3rd	Freestyle 57 kg
2022	South American Games	Asunción, Paraguay	2nd	Freestyle 57 kg
2023	Pan American Wrestling Championships	Buenos Aires, Argentina	2nd	Freestyle 57 kg
2023	Pan American Games	Santiago, Chile	1st	Freestyle 57 kg
2024	Pan American Wrestling Championships	Acapulco, Mexico	2nd	Freestyle 57 kg
