= 2024 Grand Prix Zagreb Open – Women's freestyle =

The women's freestyle competitions at the 2024 Grand Prix Zagreb Open was held in Zagreb, Croatia between 11 and 13 January 2024.

== Women's freestyle ==
Legend

- F — Won by fall
- R — Retired
- WO — Won by walkover

=== Women's freestyle 50 kg ===
11 January

Final

Final
Yui Susaki (JPN)	10
Feng Ziqi (CHN)	0

Top half

Qualification
Mariana Rojas (VEN)	0
Yui Susaki (JPN)	4^{F}
Nada Medani (EGY)	0
Nadezhda Sokolova (AIN)	10

Round of 16
Kseniya Stankevich (AIN)	7
Julie Sabatié (FRA)	1
Yui Susaki (JPN)	4^{F}
Elizaveta Smirnova (AIN)	2
Lei Chun (CHN)	7
Nadezhda Sokolova (AIN)	10
Gabija Dilytė (LTU)	4
Miglena Selishka (BUL)	5

Quarterfinals
Kseniya Stankevich (AIN)	0
Yui Susaki (JPN)	12
Nadezhda Sokolova (AIN)	10
Miglena Selishka (BUL)	0

Semifinals
Yui Susaki (JPN)	10
Nadezhda Sokolova (AIN)	0

Bottom half

Qualification
Agata Walerzak (POL)	0
Dolgorjavyn Otgonjargal (MGL)	10^{F}
Mariana Díaz (MEX)	4
Szimonetta Szekér (HUN)	6^{F}

Round of 16
Anna Łukasiak (POL)	9
Jacqueline Mollocana (ECU)	2
Dolgorjavyn Otgonjargal (MGL)	12
Madison Parks (CAN)	4
Evin Demirhan (TUR)	5^{F}
Szimonetta Szekér (HUN)	0
Feng Ziqi (CHN)	4^{F}
Emma Luttenauer (FRA)	0

Quarterfinals
Anna Łukasiak (POL)	4
Dolgorjavyn Otgonjargal (MGL)	5
Evin Demirhan (TUR)	4
Feng Ziqi (CHN)	14

Semifinals
Dolgorjavyn Otgonjargal (MGL)	2
Feng Ziqi (CHN)	12

Repechage round 1
Mariana Rojas (VEN)	0
Elizaveta Smirnova (AIN)	10

Repechage round 2
Elizaveta Smirnova (AIN)	8
Kseniya Stankevich (AIN)	2^{F}
Emma Luttenauer (FRA)	3
Evin Demirhan (TUR)	12^{F}

Bronze medals
Kseniya Stankevich (AIN)	2
Nadezhda Sokolova (AIN)	10^{F}
Evin Demirhan (TUR)	6
Dolgorjavyn Otgonjargal (MGL)	7

=== Women's freestyle 53 kg ===
13 January

Final

Final
Stalvira Orshush (HUN)
Pang Qianyu (CHN)	WO

Top half

Qualification
Jowita Wrzesień (POL)	10
Antonia Valdés (CHI)	0
Stalvira Orshush (HUN)	2
Tatiana Debien (FRA)	1
Nina Hemmer (GER)	9
Lucía Yépez (ECU)	11

Round of 16
Haley Augello (USA)	2
Karla Godinez (CAN)	5
Jowita Wrzesień (POL)	5
Katarzyna Krawczyk (POL)	4
Liliia Malanchuk (UKR)	4
Stalvira Orshush (HUN)	2^{F}
Lucía Yépez (ECU)
Dominique Parrish (USA)	WO

Quarterfinals
Karla Godinez (CAN)	1
Jowita Wrzesień (POL)	8
Stalvira Orshush (HUN)	10
Dominique Parrish (USA)	0

Semifinals
Jowita Wrzesień (POL)	3
Stalvira Orshush (HUN)	5

Bottom half

Qualification
Mariia Yefremova (UKR)	10
Ekaterina Verbina (AIN)	6
Pang Qianyu (CHN)	9^{F}
Christianah Ogunsanya (NGR)	3
Zhang Min (CHN)	12
Jonna Malmgren (SWE)	6
Anastasia Blayvas (GER)	7
Betzabeth Argüello (VEN)	4

Round of 16
Annika Wendle (GER)	5
Mariia Yefremova (UKR)	2
Pang Qianyu (CHN)	WO
~~Jacarra Winchester (USA)~~
Nethmi Poruthotage (SRI)	0
Zhang Min (CHN)	10
Anastasia Blayvas (GER)	4^{F}
Iulia Leorda (MDA)	0

Quarterfinals
Annika Wendle (GER)	0
Pang Qianyu (CHN)	8
Zhang Min (CHN)	4^{F}
Anastasia Blayvas (GER)	0

Semifinals
Pang Qianyu (CHN)	5^{F}
Zhang Min (CHN)	0

Repechage round 1
Tatiana Debien (FRA)	8
Liliia Malanchuk (UKR)	10
Christianah Ogunsanya (NGR)	WO
~~Jacarra Winchester (USA)~~

Repechage round 2
Liliia Malanchuk (UKR)	4
Dominique Parrish (USA)	14
Christianah Ogunsanya (NGR)	4
Annika Wendle (GER)	2^{F}

Bronze medals
Dominique Parrish (USA)	2
Jowita Wrzesień (POL)	4^{F}
Annika Wendle (GER)	5
Zhang Min (CHN)	3

=== Women's freestyle 55 kg ===
11 January

Main bracket

Round of 16
Gerda Terék (HUN)	7
Magdalena Głodek (POL)	18

Quarterfinals
Mariana Drăguțan (MDA)	4
Magdalena Głodek (POL)	2
Albina Rillia (UKR)	2
Roksana Zasina (POL)	3
Samantha Stewart (CAN)	10
Róza Szenttamási (HUN)	5
Gultakin Shirinova (AZE)	3
Mariia Vynnyk (UKR)	14^{F}

Semifinals
Mariana Drăguțan (MDA)	2
Roksana Zasina (POL)	5
Samantha Stewart (CAN)	6
Mariia Vynnyk (UKR)	2

Final
Roksana Zasina (POL)	1
Samantha Stewart (CAN)	3

Bronze medals
Albina Rillia (UKR)	0
Mariana Drăguțan (MDA)	4^{F}
Róza Szenttamási (HUN)	2
Mariia Vynnyk (UKR)	2

=== Women's freestyle 57 kg ===
13 January

Final

Final
Zhang Qi (CHN)	2
Hong Kexin (CHN)	7

Top half

Qualification
Zhang Qi (CHN)	11
Amel Rebiha (FRA)	0
Mathilde Rivière (FRA)	6
Betzabeth Sarco (VEN)	5

Round of 16
Elvira Kamaloğlu (TUR)	0
Elena Brugger (GER)	4^{F}
Zhang Qi (CHN)	11
Feng Yongxin (CHN)	0
Hannah Taylor (CAN)	10
Mathilde Rivière (FRA)	6
Patrycja Gil (POL)	7
Veronika Chumikova (AIN)	8

Quarterfinals
Elena Brugger (GER)	0
Zhang Qi (CHN)	6
Hannah Taylor (CAN)	4^{F}
Veronika Chumikova (AIN)	4

Semifinals
Zhang Qi (CHN)	10
Hannah Taylor (CAN)	0

Bottom half

Qualification
Amanda Martinez (USA)	0
Anhelina Lysak (POL)	10
Tamara Dollák (HUN)	0
Giullia Oliveira (BRA)	12

Round of 16
Zhala Aliyeva (AZE)	9
Hong Kexin (CHN)	20
Anhelina Lysak (POL)	8
Solomiia Vynnyk (UKR)	13
Erika Bognár (HUN)	0
Giullia Penalber (BRA)	6
Anastasia Nichita (MDA)	10
Luisa Valverde (ECU)	0

Quarterfinals
Hong Kexin (CHN)	8^{F}
Solomiia Vynnyk (UKR)	2
Giullia Penalber (BRA)	0
Anastasia Nichita (MDA)	11

Semifinals
Hong Kexin (CHN)	3
Anastasia Nichita (MDA)	2

Repechage round 1
Amel Rebiha (FRA)	0
Feng Yongxin (CHN)	11

Repechage round 2
Feng Yongxin (CHN)	10
Elena Brugger (GER)	0
Zhala Aliyeva (AZE)	6^{F}
Solomiia Vynnyk (UKR)	6

Bronze medals
Feng Yongxin (CHN)	10
Hannah Taylor (CAN)	0
Zhala Aliyeva (AZE)	4
Anastasia Nichita (MDA)	14

=== Women's freestyle 59 kg ===
12 January

Nordic group

Pos	Athlete	Pld	W	L	CP	TP	UKR	MDA	AZE	HUN
1	Alina Filipovych (UKR)	3	2	1	0	9	—	3–1	2–5	4–0 Fall
2	Mariana Cherdivara (MDA)	3	2	1	8	19	1–3 PO1	—	4–3	14–4
3	Alyona Kolesnik (AZE)	3	2	1	7	19	3–1 PO1	1–3 PO1	—	11–8
4	Nikolett Szabó (HUN)	3	0	3	2	12	0–5 FA	1–4 SU1	1–3 PO1	—

Source: UWW

=== Women's freestyle 62 kg ===
12 January

Final

Final
Aisuluu Tynybekova (KGZ)	7
Kayla Miracle (USA)	0

Top half

Qualification
Sakura Motoki (JPN)	8^{F}
Enikő Elekes (HUN)	0
Iryna Koliadenko (UKR)	2
Luisa Niemesch (GER)	0
Astrid Montero (VEN)	6
Améline Douarre (FRA)	0
Aisuluu Tynybekova (KGZ)	4
Adaugo Nwachukwu (USA)	0
Alina Kasabieva (AIN)	4
Long Jia (CHN)	2

Round of 16
Lili (CHN)	2
Sakura Motoki (JPN)	11
Iryna Koliadenko (UKR)	6^{F}
Astrid Montero (VEN)	0
Wu Yaru (CHN)	5
Aisuluu Tynybekova (KGZ)	6
Alina Kasabieva (AIN)	5
Esther Kolawole (NGR)	2

Quarterfinals
Sakura Motoki (JPN)	5
Iryna Koliadenko (UKR)	2
Aisuluu Tynybekova (KGZ)	7
Alina Kasabieva (AIN)	3

Semifinals
Sakura Motoki (JPN)	3
Aisuluu Tynybekova (KGZ)	3

Bottom half

Qualification
Johanna Lindborg (SWE)	10
Iva Gerić (CRO)	0
Sonam Malik (UWW)	0^{R}
Iryna Bondar (UKR)	4
Ana Godinez (CAN)	7
Laís Nunes (BRA)	2
Iris Thiébaux (FRA)	0
Birgul Soltanova (AZE)	6^{F}
~~Grace Bullen (NOR)~~
Veranika Ivanova (AIN)	WO
Virginia Jiménez (CHI)	14^{F}
Aleksandra Wólczyńska (POL)	2

Round of 16
Bilyana Dudova (BUL)	6
Johanna Lindborg (SWE)	4
Iryna Bondar (UKR)	3
Ana Godinez (CAN)	6
Birgul Soltanova (AZE)	0
Veranika Ivanova (AIN)	11
Virginia Jiménez (CHI)	0
Kayla Miracle (USA)	10

Quarterfinals
Bilyana Dudova (BUL)	3
Ana Godinez (CAN)	8
Veranika Ivanova (AIN)	8
Kayla Miracle (USA)	8

Semifinals
Ana Godinez (CAN)	2
Kayla Miracle (USA)	4

Repechage round 1
Adaugo Nwachukwu (USA)	5
Wu Yaru (CHN)	11

Repechage round 2
Wu Yaru (CHN)	4
Alina Kasabieva (AIN)	13^{F}
Virginia Jiménez (CHI)	0
Veranika Ivanova (AIN)	5^{F}

Bronze medals
Alina Kasabieva (AIN)	WO
Sakura Motoki (JPN)
Veranika Ivanova (AIN)	2
Ana Godinez (CAN)	0^{R}

=== Women's freestyle 65 kg ===
12 January

Nordic group

Pos	Athlete	Pld	W	L	CP	TP	UKR	TUR	GER	KAZ
1	Alla Belinska (UKR)	3	3	0	11	24	—	7–5	6–4 Fall	11–7
2	Kadriye Aksoy (TUR)	3	2	1	10	21	1–3 PO1	—	12–2	4–0 Fall
3	Anne Nürnberger (GER)	3	1	2	4	11	0–5 FA	1–4 SU1	—	5–3
4	Irina Kazyulina (KAZ)	3	0	3	2	10	1–3 PO1	0–5 FA	1–3 PO1	—

Source: UWW

=== Women's freestyle 68 kg ===
12 January

Final

Final
Zhou Feng (CHN)	2
Forrest Molinari (USA)	0

Top half

Qualification
Sofiya Georgieva (BUL)	1
Enkhsaikhany Delgermaa (MGL)	7
Elis Manolova (AZE)	4
Radhika Jaglan (UWW)	7
Zhou Feng (CHN)	11
Buse Tosun Çavuşoğlu (TUR)	0

Round of 16
Karolina Pók (HUN)	1
Hanna Sadchanka (AIN)	3
Enkhsaikhany Delgermaa (MGL)	4
Soleymi Caraballo (VEN)	0
Noémi Szabados (HUN)	6
Radhika Jaglan (UWW)	7
Zhou Feng (CHN)	4
Wiktoria Chołuj (POL)	3

Quarterfinals
Hanna Sadchanka (AIN)	0
Enkhsaikhany Delgermaa (MGL)	7
Radhika Jaglan (UWW)	0
Zhou Feng (CHN)	13

Semifinals
Enkhsaikhany Delgermaa (MGL)	5
Zhou Feng (CHN)	9

Bottom half

Qualification
Yuliana Yaneva (BUL)	12
Sophia Schäfle (GER)	0
Elizaveta Petliakova (AIN)	0
Tetiana Rizhko (UKR)	8^{F}
Vusala Parfianovich (AIN)	0
Jiang Qian (CHN)	4^{F}
Mimi Hristova (BUL)	10
Yelena Shalygina (KAZ)	0

Round of 16
Forrest Molinari (USA)	3
Yuliana Yaneva (BUL)	3
Tetiana Rizhko (UKR)	10
Adéla Hanzlíčková (CZE)	0
Veronika Vilk (CRO)	0
Jiang Qian (CHN)	11
Mimi Hristova (BUL)	8^{F}
Nurzat Nurtaeva (KGZ)	0

Quarterfinals
Forrest Molinari (USA)	5
Tetiana Rizhko (UKR)	1
Jiang Qian (CHN)	4
Mimi Hristova (BUL)	2

Semifinals
Forrest Molinari (USA)	2
Jiang Qian (CHN)	0

Repechage round 1
Buse Tosun Çavuşoğlu (TUR)	2
Wiktoria Chołuj (POL)	1

Repechage round 2
Buse Tosun Çavuşoğlu (TUR)	12
Radhika Jaglan (UWW)	6
Yuliana Yaneva (BUL)	0
Tetiana Rizhko (UKR)	2

Bronze medals
Buse Tosun Çavuşoğlu (TUR)	5
Enkhsaikhany Delgermaa (MGL)	1
Tetiana Rizhko (UKR)	11
Jiang Qian (CHN)	6

=== Women's freestyle 72 kg ===
13 January

Nordic group

Pos	Athlete	Pld	W	L	CP	TP	UKR	SRB
1	Iryna Zablotska (UKR)	1	1	0	3	5	—	5–0
2	Fanni Nađ (SRB)	1	0	1	0	0	0–3 PO	—

Source: UWW

=== Women's freestyle 76 kg ===
13 January

Final

Final
Wang Juan (CHN)	1
Aiperi Medet Kyzy (KGZ)	2

Top half

Qualification
Samar Amer (EGY)	2
Kamilė Gaučaitė (LTU)	3
Anastasiya Alpyeyeva (UKR)	8^{F}
Bernadett Nagy (HUN)	4

Round of 16
Kendra Dacher (FRA)	0
Kylie Welker (USA)	4^{F}
Kamilė Gaučaitė (LTU)	1
Wang Juan (CHN)	6
Veronika Nyikos (HUN)	0
Anastasiya Alpyeyeva (UKR)	8^{F}
Elmira Syzdykova (KAZ)	0
Kennedy Blades (USA)	10

Quarterfinals
Kylie Welker (USA)	5
Wang Juan (CHN)	8
Anastasiya Alpyeyeva (UKR)	4
Kennedy Blades (USA)	5

Semifinals
Wang Juan (CHN)	3
Kennedy Blades (USA)	3

Bottom half

Qualification
Aiperi Medet Kyzy (KGZ)	6^{F}
Rita Talismanova (AIN)	4
Anastasiia Osniach (UKR)	8^{F}
María Acosta (VEN)	2

Round of 16
Huang Yuanyuan (CHN)	0
Adeline Gray (USA)	4
Aiperi Medet Kyzy (KGZ)	6^{F}
Justina Di Stasio (CAN)	0
Pauline Lecarpentier (FRA)	3
Anastasiia Osniach (UKR)	0
Cynthia Vescan (FRA)	0
Anastasiya Zimiankova (AIN)	3

Quarterfinals
Adeline Gray (USA)	0
Aiperi Medet Kyzy (KGZ)	10
Pauline Lecarpentier (FRA)	3
Anastasiya Zimiankova (AIN)	1

Semifinals
Aiperi Medet Kyzy (KGZ)	5
Pauline Lecarpentier (FRA)	0

Repechage round 1
Rita Talismanova (AIN)	4
Justina Di Stasio (CAN)	2

Repechage round 2
Kamilė Gaučaitė (LTU)	0
Kylie Welker (USA)	5^{F}
Rita Talismanova (AIN)	2
Adeline Gray (USA)	12

Bronze medals
Kylie Welker (USA)	0
Kennedy Blades (USA)	4^{F}
Adeline Gray (USA)	3
Pauline Lecarpentier (FRA)	0

== See also ==
- 2024 Grand Prix Zagreb Open
