= 2019 World Wrestling Championships – Women's freestyle 57 kg =

Women's freestyle 57 kg at the 2019 World Championships
- Venue: Barys Arena
- Dates: 18–19 September 2019
- Competitors: 31 from 31 nations

Medalists
gold medal	Risako Kawai	Japan
silver medal	Rong Ningning	China
bronze medal	Iryna Kurachkina	Belarus
bronze medal	Odunayo Adekuoroye	Nigeria

The women's freestyle 57 kilograms is a competition featured at the 2019 World Wrestling Championships, and was held in Nur-Sultan, Kazakhstan on 18 and 19 September.

This freestyle wrestling competition consists of a single-elimination tournament, with a repechage used to determine the winner of two bronze medals. The two finalists face off for gold and silver medals. Each wrestler who loses to one of the two finalists moves into the repechage, culminating in a pair of bronze medal matches featuring the semifinal losers each facing the remaining repechage opponent from their half of the bracket.

== Results ==
Legend

- F — Won by fall

=== Final ===
Final
Rong Ningning (CHN)	6
Risako Kawai (JPN)	9

=== Top half ===
Round of 32
Iryna Kurachkina (BLR)	6
Elif Jale Yeşilırmak (TUR)	3
Jenna Burkert (USA)	8
Lenka Hocková (CZE)	0
Um Ji-eun (KOR)	2
Marina Simonyan (RUS)	2
Nes Marie Rodríguez (PUR)	0
Arianna Carieri (ITA)	6^{F}
Johanna Lindborg (SWE)	2
Jowita Wrzesień (POL)	4
Nigora Bakirova (UZB)	1
Giullia Penalber (BRA)	4
Emma Tissina (KAZ)	0
Emese Barka (HUN)	9

Round of 16
Rong Ningning (CHN)	4
Iryna Kurachkina (BLR)	1
Jenna Burkert (USA)	2
Marina Simonyan (RUS)	9^{F}
Arianna Carieri (ITA)	1
Jowita Wrzesień (POL)	2
Giullia Penalber (BRA)	8^{F}
Emese Barka (HUN)	3

Quarterfinals
Rong Ningning (CHN)	15
Marina Simonyan (RUS)	4
Jowita Wrzesień (POL)	4^{F}
Giullia Penalber (BRA)	2

Semifinals
Rong Ningning (CHN)	6
Jowita Wrzesień (POL)	1

=== Bottom half ===
Round of 32
Odunayo Adekuoroye (NGR)	10
Nguyễn Thị Mỹ Trang (VIE)	0
Mimi Hristova (BUL)	2
Mathilde Rivière (FRA)	4
Hannah Taylor (CAN)	2
Jong In-sun (PRK)	9
Alyona Kolesnik (AZE)	5^{F}
Iryna Chykhradze (UKR)	0
Elena Brugger (GER)	1
Lissette Antes (ECU)	4
Sükheegiin Tserenchimed (MGL)	0
Risako Kawai (JPN)	10
Anastasia Nichita (MDA)	5
Sarita Mor (IND)	1
Nuraida Anarkulova (KGZ)	0
Grace Bullen (NOR)	6^{F}

Round of 16
Odunayo Adekuoroye (NGR)	10
Mathilde Rivière (FRA)	0
Jong In-sun (PRK)	11
Alyona Kolesnik (AZE)	0
Lissette Antes (ECU)	0
Risako Kawai (JPN)	5
Anastasia Nichita (MDA)	11
Grace Bullen (NOR)	2

Quarterfinals
Odunayo Adekuoroye (NGR)	12
Jong In-sun (PRK)	2
Risako Kawai (JPN)	5
Anastasia Nichita (MDA)	0

Semifinals
Odunayo Adekuoroye (NGR)	1
Risako Kawai (JPN)	6

=== Repechage ===
Repechage round 1
Sükheegiin Tserenchimed (MGL)	4
Lissette Antes (ECU)	8

Repechage round 2
Iryna Kurachkina (BLR)	19
Marina Simonyan (RUS)	8
Lissette Antes (ECU)	0
Anastasia Nichita (MDA)	8

Bronze medals
Iryna Kurachkina (BLR)	4
Jowita Wrzesień (POL)	0
Anastasia Nichita (MDA)	0
Odunayo Adekuoroye (NGR)	10
