= 2019 European Wrestling Championships – Women's freestyle 57 kg =

The women's freestyle 57 kg is a competition featured at the 2019 European Wrestling Championships, and was held in Bucharest, Romania on April 11 and April 12.

== Medalists ==
Gold	Emese Barka; Hungary
Silver	Tetyana Kit; Ukraine
Bronze	Alyona Kolesnik; Azerbaijan
Bronze	Anastasia Nichita; Moldova

== Results ==
Legend

- F — Won by fall

=== Final ===
Final
Emese Barka (HUN)	4
Tetyana Kit (UKR)	2

=== Top half ===
Round of 32

Round of 16
Elif Yanık (TUR)	4^{F}
Kornelija Zaicevaitė (LTU)	0
Lenka Hocková (CZE)	0
Mimi Hristova (BUL)	6^{F}
Emese Barka (HUN)	4^{F}
Denisa Fodor (ROU)	0
Alyona Kolesnik (AZE)	2^{F}
Johanna Lindborg (SWE)	0

Quarterfinals
Elif Yanık (TUR)	4
Mimi Hristova (BUL)	6
Emese Barka (HUN)	8
Alyona Kolesnik (AZE)	5

Semifinals
Mimi Hristova (BUL)	3
Emese Barka (HUN)	11

=== Bottom half ===
Round of 32
Zoi Chatsatourova (GRE)	0
Iryna Kurachkina (BLR)	8^{F}
Grace Bullen (NOR)	13
Jeannie Kessler (AUT)	0
Jowita Wrzesień (POL)	3^{F}
Victoria Báez-Dilone (ESP)	0
Anastasia Nichita (MDA)	10
Elena Brugger (GER)	0

Round of 16
Mathilde Rivière (FRA)	9^{F}
Olga Khoroshavtseva (RUS)	0
Tetyana Kit (UKR)	14
Francesca Indelicato (ITA)	3
Iryna Kurachkina (BLR)	6
Grace Bullen (NOR)	8
Jowita Wrzesień (POL)	0
Anastasia Nichita (MDA)	10

Quarterfinals
Mathilde Rivière (FRA)	3
Tetyana Kit (UKR)	4
Grace Bullen (NOR)	2
Anastasia Nichita (MDA)	13

Semifinals
Tetyana Kit (UKR)	6
Anastasia Nichita (MDA)	6

=== Repechage ===
Repechage round 1
Denisa Fodor (ROU)	0
Alyona Kolesnik (AZE)	4^{F}
Francesca Indelicato (ITA)	2
Mathilde Rivière (FRA)	12

Bronze medal match
Alyona Kolesnik (AZE)	10^{F}
Mimi Hristova (BUL)	2
Mathilde Rivière (FRA)	7
Anastasia Nichita (MDA)	8
