= 2023 European Wrestling Championships – Women's freestyle 57 kg =

Wrestling competition

Women's freestyle 57 kg at the 2023 European Wrestling Championships
- Venue: Arena Zagreb
- Location: Zagreb, Croatia
- Dates: 20-21 April
- Competitors: 12

Medalists
gold medal	Alina Hrushyna	Ukraine
silver medal	Zhala Aliyeva	Azerbaijan
bronze medal	Evelina Nikolova	Bulgaria
bronze medal	Elena Brugger	Germany

The women's freestyle 57 kg is a competition featured at the 2023 European Wrestling Championships, and will held in Zagreb, Croatia on April 20 and 21.

== Results ==
Legend

- F — Won by fall

Round of 16
Jenna Hemiä (FIN)	1
Mathilde Rivière (FRA)	5^{F}
Evelina Hulthén (SWE)	6
Lana Nogić (CRO)	0
Graciela Sánchez (ESP)	0
Elvira Kamaloğlu (TUR)	7^{F}
Anna Szél (HUN)	1
Elena Brugger (GER)	3^{F}

Quarterfinals
Alina Hrushyna (UKR)	5^{F}
Mathilde Rivière (FRA)	0
Evelina Hulthén (SWE)	0
Evelina Nikolova (BUL)	10
Jowita Wrzesień (POL)	8
Elvira Kamaloğlu (TUR)	3
Elena Brugger (GER)	3
Zhala Aliyeva (AZE)	6

Semifinals
Alina Hrushyna (UKR)	2^{F}
Evelina Nikolova (BUL)	0
Jowita Wrzesień (POL)	0
Zhala Aliyeva (AZE)	5

Final
Alina Hrushyna (UKR)	10^{F}
Zhala Aliyeva (AZE)	0

Bronze medal match
Mathilde Rivière (FRA)	2
Evelina Nikolova (BUL)	4
Elena Brugger (GER)	3
Jowita Wrzesień (POL)	1

== Final standing ==
Rank	Athlete
1st place, gold medalist(s)	Alina Hrushyna (UKR)
2nd place, silver medalist(s)	Zhala Aliyeva (AZE)
3rd place, bronze medalist(s)	Evelina Nikolova (BUL)
3rd place, bronze medalist(s)	Elena Brugger (GER)
5	Jowita Wrzesień (POL)
5	Mathilde Rivière (FRA)
7	Elvira Kamaloğlu (TUR)
8	Evelina Hulthén (SWE)
9	Anna Szél (HUN)
10	Jenna Hemiä (FIN)
11	Lana Nogić (CRO)
12	Graciela Sánchez (ESP)
