= 2021 European Wrestling Championships – Women's freestyle 59 kg =

Wrestling competition

The women's freestyle 59 kg is a competition featured at the 2021 European Wrestling Championships, and was held in Warsaw, Poland on April 21 and April 22.

== Medalists ==
Gold	Bilyana Dudova; Bulgaria
Silver	Veronika Chumikova; Russia
Bronze	Kateryna Zhydachevska; Romania
Bronze	Anastasia Nichita; Moldova

== Results ==
Legend

- F — Won by fall

1/8 finals
Jowita Wrzesień (POL)	4
Grace Bullen (NOR)	7
Kateryna Zelenykh (UKR)	0
Anastasia Nichita (MDA)	10

Quarterfinals
Ineta Dantaitė (LTU)	0
Yuliya Pisarenka (BLR)	10
Bilyana Dudova (BUL)	6
Kateryna Zhydachevska (ROU)	0
Elif Yanık (TUR)	0
Veronika Chumikova (RUS)	10
Grace Bullen (NOR)	0
Anastasia Nichita (MDA)	7

Semifinals
Yuliya Pisarenka (BLR)	1
Bilyana Dudova (BUL)	2
Veronika Chumikova (RUS)	4
Anastasia Nichita (MDA)	4

Final
Bilyana Dudova (BUL)	5
Veronika Chumikova (RUS)	1

Bronze medal match
Kateryna Zhydachevska (ROU)	3
Yuliya Pisarenka (BLR)	3
Elif Yanık (TUR)	0
Anastasia Nichita (MDA)	8^{F}

== Final standing ==
Rank	Athlete
1st place, gold medalist(s)	Bilyana Dudova (BUL)
2nd place, silver medalist(s)	Veronika Chumikova (RUS)
3rd place, bronze medalist(s)	Kateryna Zhydachevska (ROU)
3rd place, bronze medalist(s)	Anastasia Nichita (MDA)
5	Yuliya Pisarenka (BLR)
5	Elif Yanık (TUR)
7	Grace Bullen (NOR)
8	Jowita Wrzesień (POL)
9	Ineta Dantaitė (LTU)
10	Kateryna Zelenykh (UKR)
