= Wrestling at the 2019 European Games – Women's freestyle 57 kg =

Women's freestyle 57kg at the 2019 European Games
- Venue: Minsk Sports Palace
- Date: 27 June and 28 June
- Competitors: 16 from 16 nations

Medalists
| gold medal | Iryna Kurachkina | Belarus |
| silver medal | Mimi Hristova | Bulgaria |
| bronze medal | Alyona Kolesnik | Azerbaijan |
| bronze medal | Anastasia Nichita | Moldova |

The women's freestyle 57 kilograms wrestling competition at the 2019 European Games in Minsk was held on 27 to 28 June 2019 at the Minsk Sports Palace.

== Schedule ==
All times are in FET (UTC+03:00)

| Date | Time | Event |
|---|---|---|
| Thursday, 27 June 2019 | 11:50 | 1/8 finals |
| Thursday, 27 June 2019 | 13:20 | Quarterfinals |
| Thursday, 27 June 2019 | 18:10 | Semifinals |
| Friday, 28 June 2019 | 11:00 | Repechage |
| Friday, 28 June 2019 | 18:50 | Finals |

== Results ==
Legend

- F — Won by fall

=== Main bracket ===
1/8 finals
Mimi Hristova (BUL) | 8^{F}
Francesca Indelicato (ITA) | 2
Ramóna Galambos (HUN) | 0
Alyona Kolesnik (AZE) | 10
Johanna Lindborg (SWE) | 6
Victoria Báez-Dilone (ESP) | 0
Bediha Gün (TUR) | 13
Zoi Chatsatourova (GRE) | 3
Anastasia Nichita (MDA) | 11
Lenka Hocková (CZE) | 0
Iryna Chykhradze (UKR) | 3
Mathilde Rivière (FRA) | 2
Grace Bullen (NOR) | 8^{F}
Auksė Rutkauskaitė (LTU) | 0
Jowita Wrzesień (POL) | 0
Iryna Kurachkina (BLR) | 11

Quarterfinals
Mimi Hristova (BUL) | 6
Alyona Kolesnik (AZE) | 0
Johanna Lindborg (SWE) | 0
Bediha Gün (TUR) | 10
Anastasia Nichita (MDA) | 4^{F}
Iryna Chykhradze (UKR) | 2
Grace Bullen (NOR) | 8
Iryna Kurachkina (BLR) | 9

Semifinals
Mimi Hristova (BUL) | 6^{F}
Bediha Gün (TUR) | 2
Anastasia Nichita (MDA) | 6
Iryna Kurachkina (BLR) | 8

Final
Mimi Hristova (BUL) | 0
Iryna Kurachkina (BLR) | 10

=== Repechage ===
Repechage round 1
Francesca Indelicato (ITA) | 1
Alyona Kolesnik (AZE) | 12
Jowita Wrzesień (POL) | 2
Grace Bullen (NOR) | 7

Bronze medals
Alyona Kolesnik (AZE) | 9
Bediha Gün (TUR) | 4
Grace Bullen (NOR) | 4
Anastasia Nichita (MDA) | 11
