= Mehlika Öztürk =

Turkish freestyle wrestler

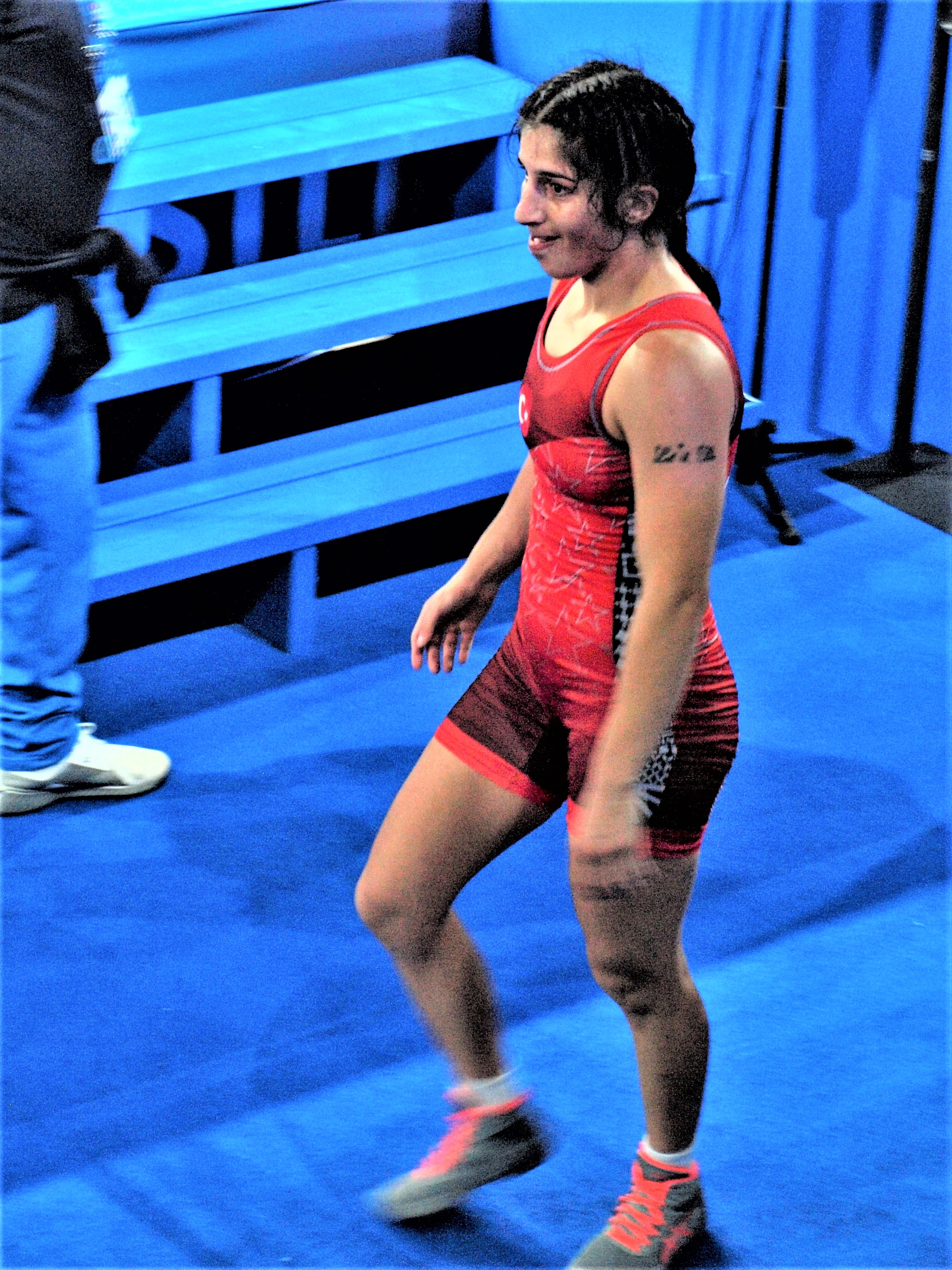
- Öztürk at the 2021 World Wrestling Championships in Oslo, Norway

Personal information
- Born: 29 June 1997 (age 29) Manisa, Turkey
- Height: 160 cm (5 ft 3 in)
- Weight: 57 kg (126 lb)

Sport
- Country: Turkey
- Sport: Amateur wrestling
- Event: Freestyle
- Club: Tekirdağ Çorlu Belediyesi
Medal record
Representing Turkey
Women's freestyle wrestling
Individual World Cup
Bronze medal – third place	2020 Belgrade	57 kg
Yasar Dogu Tournament
Gold medal – first place	2021 Istanbul	55 kg
Gold medal – first place	2023 Istanbul	59 kg
Women's beach wrestling
World Beach Games
Silver medal – second place	2019 Doha	60 kg

Mehlika Öztürk (born 29 June 1997) is a Turkish freestyle wrestler. She won a bronze medal at the 2020 Individual Wrestling World Cup held in Belgrade, Serbia and she won the silver medal in beach wrestling in her event at the 2019 World Beach Games held in Doha, Qatar.

== Early life ==
Öztürk was born in Manisa, Turkey. She is 160 cm (5 ft 3 in) tall at 57 kg (126 lb). She is a member of Tekirdağ Çorlu Belediyesi.

== Career ==
She competed in the women's freestyle 57 kg event at the 2018 European Wrestling Championships held in Kaspiysk, Russia. She was eliminated in her first match by Alyona Kolesnik of Azerbaijan.

In 2019, she represented Turkey at the World Beach Games in Doha, Qatar and she won the silver medal in the women's 60 kg beach wrestling event.

In 2020, at the European Wrestling Championships held in Rome, Italy, she competed in the women's 57 kg event where she was eliminated in her second match. In the same year, she won one of the bronze medals in the women's 57 kg event at the 2020 Individual Wrestling World Cup held in Belgrade, Serbia. In April 2021, she was eliminated in her first match in the women's 57 kg event at the European Wrestling Championships in Warsaw, Poland. In October 2021, she was also eliminated in her first match in the women's 55 kg event at the World Wrestling Championships held in Oslo, Norway.

In 2022, she competed at the Yasar Dogu Tournament held in Istanbul, Turkey.

== Achievements ==
Year	Tournament	Location	Result	Event
2019	World Beach Games	Doha, Qatar	2nd	Beach wrestling 60 kg
