= 2018 European Wrestling Championships – Women's freestyle 57 kg =

The women's freestyle 57 kg is a competition featured at the 2018 European Wrestling Championships, and was held in Kaspiysk, Russia on May 3 and May 4.

== Medalists ==
Gold	Bilyana Dudova; Bulgaria
Silver	Irina Ologonova; Russia
Bronze	Emese Barka; Hungary
Bronze	Alyona Kolesnik; Azerbaijan

== Results ==
Legend

- F — Won by fall

=== Main Bracket ===
1/8 finals
Irina Ologonova (RUS)	10
Szilvia Peter (SWE)	0
Kateryna Zhydachevska (ROU)	4
Zalina Sidakova (BLR)	6^{F}
Grace Bullen (NOR)	4
Jowita Wrzesień (POL)	4
Mehlika Öztürk (TUR)	0
Alyona Kolesnik (AZE)	6^{F}

Quarterfinals
Tetyana Kit (UKR)	0
Emese Barka (HUN)	4
Laura Mertens (GER)	1
Bilyana Dudova (BUL)	4
Irina Ologonova (RUS)	10
Zalina Sidakova (BLR)	0
Grace Bullen (NOR)	0
Alyona Kolesnik (AZE)	10

Semifinals
Emese Barka (HUN)	1
Bilyana Dudova (BUL)	7
Irina Ologonova (RUS)	3
Alyona Kolesnik (AZE)	2

Final
Bilyana Dudova (BUL)	6
Irina Ologonova (RUS)	0

=== Repechage ===
Repechage round 1
Szilvia Peter (SWE)	0
Zalina Sidakova (BLR)	8

Bronze medal match
Laura Mertens (GER)	0
Emese Barka (HUN)	11
Zalina Sidakova (BLR)	0
Alyona Kolesnik (AZE)	4^{F}
