= 2022 Yasar Dogu Tournament =

Yasar Dogu 2022
- Host city: Istanbul, Turkey
- Dates: 24–27 February
- Stadium: Başakşehir Youth and Sports Facility

Champions
- Freestyle: Turkey
- Women: Russian Wrestling Federation

The 50th Yasar Dogu Tournament 2022, was a wrestling event held in Istanbul, Turkey between 24 and 27 February 2022. It was held as the first of the ranking series together with the 2022 Vehbi Emre & Hamit Kaplan Tournament.

The international tournament included competition in both men's and women's freestyle wrestling. The tournament was held in honor of Olympic Champion, Yaşar Doğu.

== Ranking Series ==
Ranking Series Calendar 2022:

- 1st Ranking Series: 24-27 February, Turkey, Istanbul ⇒ 2022 Yasar Dogu Tournament
  2022 Vehbi Emre & Hamit Kaplan Tournament
- 2nd Ranking Series: 2-5 June, Kazakhstan, Almaty ⇒ 2022 Bolat Turlykhanov Cup
- 3rd Ranking Series: 22-25 June, Italy, Rome ⇒ Matteo Pellicone Ranking Series 2022
- 4th Ranking Series: 14-17 July, Tunisia, Tunis ⇒ 2022 Tunis Ranking Series

== Competition schedule ==
All times are (UTC+3)

Date	Time	Event
24 February Thursday	10.30-14.30	Qualification rounds & repechage GR – 55-60-63-67-87-97-130 kg
24 February Thursday	18.00-20.30	Final matches and awarding ceremony: GR – 55-60-63-67-87-97-130 kg
25 February Friday	10.30-14.30	Qualification rounds & repechage GR – 72-77-82kg & WW – 57-62-68-76 kg
25 February Friday	18.00-20.30	Final matches and awarding ceremony: Finals GR – 72-77-82 kg & WW – 57-62-68-76 kg
26 February Saturday	10.30-14.30	Qualification rounds & repechage WW – 50-53-55-59-65-72 kg & FS – 97-125 kg
26 February Saturday	18.00-20.30	Final matches and awarding ceremony: Finals WW – 50-53-55-59-65-72 kg & FS – 97-125 kg
27 February Sunday	10.30-14.30	Qualification rounds & repechage FS – 57-61-65-70-74-79-86-92 kg
27 February Sunday	18.00-20.30	Final matches and awarding ceremony: Finals FS – 57-61-65-70-74-79-86-92 kg

== Medal table ==
Rank	Nation	Gold	Silver	Bronze	Total
1	United States	3	4	5	12
2	Turkey	3	3	2	8
3	Iran	3	0	1	4
4	Mongolia	2	2	2	6
5	Kyrgyzstan	2	1	3	6
6	Russian Wrestling Federation	1	5	6	12
7	Kazakhstan	1	0	3	4
8	India	1	0	2	3
9	Bulgaria	1	0	1	2
9	Moldova	1	0	1	2
9	Romania	1	0	1	2
12	Nigeria	1	0	0	1
13	Uzbekistan	0	1	2	3
14	Georgia	0	1	1	2
14	Germany	0	1	1	2
14	Poland	0	1	1	2
17	Austria	0	1	0	1
18	Azerbaijan	0	0	2	2
18	Tunisia	0	0	2	2
20	Belarus	0	0	1	1
20	Czech Republic	0	0	1	1
20	Hungary	0	0	1	1
20	Lithuania	0	0	1	1
Totals (23 entries)		20	20	40	80

== Team ranking ==
Rank	Men's freestyle		Women's freestyle	
Rank	Team	Points	Team	Points
1	Turkey	144	Russian Wrestling Federation	150
2	Iran	120	United States	105
3	Kyrgyzstan	92	Mongolia	85
4	United States	90	Kazakhstan	78
5	Russian Wrestling Federation	90	Romania	64
6	India	77	Bulgaria	60
7	Kazakhstan	64	Poland	55
8	Georgia	63	Germany	51
9	Mongolia	61	India	50
10	Uzbekistan	52	Kyrgyzstan	45

== Medal overview ==
=== Men's freestyle ===
Event	Gold	Silver	Bronze
57 kg	Almaz Smanbekov; Kyrgyzstan	Beka Bujiashvili; Georgia	Aman Sehrawat; India
57 kg	Almaz Smanbekov; Kyrgyzstan	Beka Bujiashvili; Georgia	Muhammet Karavuş; Turkey
61 kg	Ravi Kumar Dahiya; India	Gulomjon Abdullaev; Uzbekistan	Nico Megaludis; United States
61 kg	Ravi Kumar Dahiya; India	Gulomjon Abdullaev; Uzbekistan	Ulukbek Zholdoshbekov; Kyrgyzstan
65 kg	Shamil Mamedov; Russian Wrestling Federation	Zagir Shakhiev; Russian Wrestling Federation	Joseph McKenna; United States
65 kg	Shamil Mamedov; Russian Wrestling Federation	Zagir Shakhiev; Russian Wrestling Federation	Umidjon Jalolov; Uzbekistan
70 kg	Amir Mohammad Yazdani; Iran	James Green; United States	Viktor Rassadin; Russian Wrestling Federation
70 kg	Amir Mohammad Yazdani; Iran	James Green; United States	Zurabi Iakobishvili; Georgia
74 kg	Soner Demirtaş; Turkey	Fazlı Eryılmaz; Turkey	Islambek Orozbekov; Kyrgyzstan
74 kg	Soner Demirtaş; Turkey	Fazlı Eryılmaz; Turkey	Zandanbudyn Sumiyaabazar; Mongolia
79 kg	Jordan Burroughs; United States	Chance Marsteller; United States	Ali Savadkouhi; Iran
79 kg	Jordan Burroughs; United States	Chance Marsteller; United States	Arsalan Budazhapov; Kyrgyzstan
86 kg	Osman Göçen; Turkey	Fatih Erdin; Turkey	Bekzod Abdurakhmonov; Uzbekistan
86 kg	Osman Göçen; Turkey	Fatih Erdin; Turkey	Gadzhimurad Magomedsaidov; Azerbaijan
92 kg	Ahmad Bazri; Iran	Erhan Yaylacı; Turkey	Deepak Punia; India
92 kg	Ahmad Bazri; Iran	Erhan Yaylacı; Turkey	Ahmet Bilici; Turkey
97 kg	Mohammad Hossein Mohammadian; Iran	Alikhan Zhabrailov; Russian Wrestling Federation	Kollin Moore; United States
97 kg	Mohammad Hossein Mohammadian; Iran	Alikhan Zhabrailov; Russian Wrestling Federation	Mamed Ibragimov; Kazakhstan
125 kg	Taha Akgül; Turkey	Mönkhtöriin Lkhagvagerel; Mongolia	Dániel Ligeti; Hungary
125 kg	Taha Akgül; Turkey	Mönkhtöriin Lkhagvagerel; Mongolia	Yusup Batirmurzaev; Kazakhstan

=== Women's freestyle ===
Event	Gold	Silver	Bronze
50 kg	Alina Vuc; Romania	Polina Lukina; Russian Wrestling Federation	Miglena Selishka; Bulgaria
50 kg	Alina Vuc; Romania	Polina Lukina; Russian Wrestling Federation	Dolgorjavyn Otgonjargal; Mongolia
53 kg	Bat-Ochiryn Bolortuyaa; Mongolia	Milana Dadasheva; Russian Wrestling Federation	Iulia Leorda; Moldova
53 kg	Bat-Ochiryn Bolortuyaa; Mongolia	Milana Dadasheva; Russian Wrestling Federation	Dominique Parrish; United States
55 kg	Jacarra Winchester; United States	Katarzyna Krawczyk; Poland	Ekaterina Isakova; Russian Wrestling Federation
55 kg	Jacarra Winchester; United States	Katarzyna Krawczyk; Poland	Aleksandra Skirenko; Russian Wrestling Federation
57 kg	Evelina Nikolova; Bulgaria	Khürelkhüügiin Bolortuyaa; Mongolia	Iryna Kurachkina; Belarus
57 kg	Evelina Nikolova; Bulgaria	Khürelkhüügiin Bolortuyaa; Mongolia	Veronika Chumikova; Russian Wrestling Federation
59 kg	Anastasia Nichita; Moldova	Zhargalma Tsyrempilova; Russian Wrestling Federation	Alyona Kolesnik; Azerbaijan
59 kg	Anastasia Nichita; Moldova	Zhargalma Tsyrempilova; Russian Wrestling Federation	Jowita Wrzesień; Poland
62 kg	Sükheegiin Tserenchimed; Mongolia	Macey Kilty; United States	Marwa Amri; Tunisia
62 kg	Sükheegiin Tserenchimed; Mongolia	Macey Kilty; United States	Svetlana Lipatova; Russian Wrestling Federation
65 kg	Forrest Molinari; United States	Mallory Velte; United States	Khadija Jlassi; Tunisia
65 kg	Forrest Molinari; United States	Mallory Velte; United States	Emma Bruntil; United States
68 kg	Blessing Oborududu; Nigeria	Meerim Zhumanazarova; Kyrgyzstan	Khanum Velieva; Russian Wrestling Federation
68 kg	Blessing Oborududu; Nigeria	Meerim Zhumanazarova; Kyrgyzstan	Adéla Hanzlíčková; Czech Republic
72 kg	Zhamila Bakbergenova; Kazakhstan	Anna Schell; Germany	Danutė Domikaitytė; Lithuania
72 kg	Zhamila Bakbergenova; Kazakhstan	Anna Schell; Germany	Alexandra Anghel; Romania
76 kg	Aiperi Medet Kyzy; Kyrgyzstan	Martina Kuenz; Austria	Gulmaral Yerkebayeva; Kazakhstan
76 kg	Aiperi Medet Kyzy; Kyrgyzstan	Martina Kuenz; Austria	Francy Rädelt; Germany

== Participating nations ==
364 competitors from 38 nations participated.

- Australia (1)
- Austria (2)
- Azerbaijan (12)
- Belarus (3)
- Bulgaria (6)
- Belarus (6)
- Czech Republic (1)
- Ecuador (1)
- Egypt (1)
- Finland (2)
- France (5)
- Georgia (10)
- Germany (9)
- Hungary (2)
- India (24)
- Iran (13)
- Israel (1)
- Italy (1)
- Kazakhstan (52)
- Kyrgyzstan (13)
- Kuwait (2)
- Latvia (2)
- Lithuania (4)
- Moldova (2)
- Mongolia (15)
- Nigeria (2)
- Poland (10)
- Puerto Rico (1)
- Romania (9)
- Russian Wrestling Federation (37)
- Serbia (2)
- Slovakia (4)
- Sweden (1)
- Tajikistan (2)
- Tunisia (3)
- Turkey (58)
- United States (28)
- Uzbekistan (17)

== Results ==
=== Men's freestyle ===
==== Men's freestyle 57 kg ====
Legend

- F — Won by fall
- WO — Won by walkover

Final
Beka Bujiashvili (GEO)
Almaz Smanbekov (KGZ)	WO

Top half

Round of 32
Rakhat Kalzhan (KAZ)	10
Martin Židzik (SVK)	0

Round of 16
Ali Azimi (IRI)	4
Beka Bujiashvili (GEO)	14
Rakhat Kalzhan (KAZ)	2
Zandanbudyn Zanabazar (MGL)	4
Daulet Temirzhanov (KAZ)	10
Horst Lehr (GER)	4
Aman Sehrawat (IND)	10^{F}
Guesseppe Rea (ECU)	2

Quarterfinals
Beka Bujiashvili (GEO)	6
Zandanbudyn Zanabazar (MGL)	1
Daulet Temirzhanov (KAZ)	4
Aman Sehrawat (IND)	15

Semifinals
Beka Bujiashvili (GEO)	16
Aman Sehrawat (IND)	10

Bottom half

Round of 32

Round of 16
Hikmatullo Vohidov (TJK)	14
Batkhuyagiin Mönkh-Erdene (MGL)	14
Muhammet Karavuş (TUR)	10
Darian Cruz (PUR)	4
Almaz Smanbekov (KGZ)	WO
~~Assylzhan Yessengeldi (KAZ)~~
Ahmet Karavuş (TUR)	2
Şaban Kızıltaş (TUR)	5

Quarterfinals
Hikmatullo Vohidov (TJK)	8
Muhammet Karavuş (TUR)	19^{F}
Almaz Smanbekov (KGZ)	11
Şaban Kızıltaş (TUR)	0

Semifinals
Muhammet Karavuş (TUR)	0
Almaz Smanbekov (KGZ)	11

Repechage round 2
Ali Azimi (IRI)	6
Zandanbudyn Zanabazar (MGL)	8
~~Assylzhan Yessengeldi (KAZ)~~
Şaban Kızıltaş (TUR)	WO

Bronze medals
Zandanbudyn Zanabazar (MGL)	5
Aman Sehrawat (IND)	10
Şaban Kızıltaş (TUR)	0
Muhammet Karavuş (TUR)	7

==== Men's freestyle 61 kg ====
Legend

- F — Won by fall

Final
Ravi Kumar Dahiya (IND)	11
Gulomjon Abdullaev (UZB)	10

Top half

Round of 32
Ravi Kumar Dahiya (IND)	7
Mangal Kadyan (IND)	0
Assyl Aitakyn (KAZ)
Süleyman Atlı (TUR)	WO

Round of 16
Georgii Okorokov (AUS)	7
Nico Megaludis (USA)	11
Ravi Kumar Dahiya (IND)	7
Shamil Omarov (ITA)	2
Teimuraz Waniszwili (GEO)	8
Süleyman Atlı (TUR)	13
Saeid Anvari (IRI)	1
Bagher Yakhkeshi (IRI)	5

Quarterfinals
Nico Megaludis (USA)	1
Ravi Kumar Dahiya (IND)	10
Süleyman Atlı (TUR)	5
Bagher Yakhkeshi (IRI)	7

Semifinals
Ravi Kumar Dahiya (IND)	9^{F}
Bagher Yakhkeshi (IRI)	2

Bottom half

Round of 32
Daniel DeShazer (USA)	1
Ramiz Gamzatov (RWF)	5
Gulomjon Abdullaev (UZB)	7
Recep Topal (TUR)	4

Round of 16
Adam Biboulatov (FRA)	0
Ulukbek Zholdoshbekov (KGZ)	11
Ramiz Gamzatov (RWF)	0
Ahmet Taş (TUR)	12
Islam Bazarganov (AZE)	2
Gulomjon Abdullaev (UZB)	3
Zhassulan Taskul (KAZ)	3
Akbar Kurbanov (KAZ)	3^{F}

Quarterfinals
Ulukbek Zholdoshbekov (KGZ)	16
Ahmet Taş (TUR)	5
Gulomjon Abdullaev (UZB)	7
Akbar Kurbanov (KAZ)	3

Semifinals
Ulukbek Zholdoshbekov (KGZ)	0
Gulomjon Abdullaev (UZB)	7^{F}

Repechage round 1
Mangal Kadyan (IND)	4
Shamil Omarov (ITA)	8
Recep Topal (TUR)	8
Islam Bazarganov (AZE)	7

Repechage round 2
Shamil Omarov (ITA)	4
Nico Megaludis (USA)	4
Recep Topal (TUR)	9
Akbar Kurbanov (KAZ)	4

Bronze medals
Nico Megaludis (USA)	6
Bagher Yakhkeshi (IRI)	4
Recep Topal (TUR)	2
Ulukbek Zholdoshbekov (KGZ)	7^{F}

==== Men's freestyle 65 kg ====
Legend

- F — Won by fall
- R — Retired
- WO — Won by walkover

Final
Zagir Shakhiev (RWF)	0
Shamil Mamedov (RWF)	4^{F}

Top half

Round of 32
Bekzat Yermekbay (KAZ)	4
Joseph McKenna (USA)	15
Adil Ospanov (KAZ)	5
Zagir Shakhiev (RWF)	15
Nodir Rakhimov (UZB)	2
Nikolai Okhlopkov (ROU)	6
Mensur Bayoğlu (TUR)	1
Rohit Singh (IND)	11
Münir Recep Aktaş (TUR)	10
Ilman Mukhtarov (FRA)	0

Round of 16
Evan Henderson (USA)	9
Joseph McKenna (USA)	17
Zagir Shakhiev (RWF)	11
Nikolai Okhlopkov (ROU)	0
Adlan Askarov (KAZ)	8
Rohit Singh (IND)	13
Münir Recep Aktaş (TUR)	7
Ikromzhon Hadzhimuradov (KGZ)	13

Quarterfinals
Joseph McKenna (USA)	9
Zagir Shakhiev (RWF)	11
Rohit Singh (IND)	4
Ikromzhon Hadzhimuradov (KGZ)	5

Semifinals
Zagir Shakhiev (RWF)	9
Ikromzhon Hadzhimuradov (KGZ)	5^{R}

Bottom half

Round of 32
Umidjon Jalolov (UZB)	10
Ali Rahimzade (AZE)	0
Rahman Rahimpour (IRI)	0
Morteza Ghiasi (IRI)	10
Beka Lomtadze (GEO)	WO
~~Iszmail Muszukajev (HUN)~~
Akhmednabi Gvarzatilov (AZE)	15
Ertuğrul Kahveci (TUR)	5
Tömör-Ochiryn Tulga (MGL)	2
Tseveensürengiin Tsogbadrakh (MGL)	0

Round of 16
Abbos Rakhmonov (UZB)	8
Umidjon Jalolov (UZB)	9
Morteza Ghiasi (IRI)	0
Shamil Mamedov (RWF)	7
Beka Lomtadze (GEO)	7
Akhmednabi Gvarzatilov (AZE)	10
Tömör-Ochiryn Tulga (MGL)	10
Quentin Sticker (FRA)	0

Quarterfinals
Umidjon Jalolov (UZB)	0
Shamil Mamedov (RWF)	4
Akhmednabi Gvarzatilov (AZE)	6
Tömör-Ochiryn Tulga (MGL)	9

Semifinals
Shamil Mamedov (RWF)	4
Tömör-Ochiryn Tulga (MGL)	2

Repechage round 1
Adil Ospanov (KAZ)	0
Nikolai Okhlopkov (ROU)	6

Repechage round 2
Nikolai Okhlopkov (ROU)	2
Joseph McKenna (USA)	10^{F}
Morteza Ghiasi (IRI)	0
Umidjon Jalolov (UZB)	6

Bronze medals
Joseph McKenna (USA)	WO
Ikromzhon Hadzhimuradov (KGZ)
Umidjon Jalolov (UZB)	5
Tömör-Ochiryn Tulga (MGL)	4

==== Men's freestyle 70 kg ====
Legend

- F — Won by fall

Final
James Green (USA)	2
Amir Mohammad Yazdani (IRI)	8

Top half

Round of 32
Gankhuyagiin Khanbürged (MGL)	10
Vishal Kaliramana (IND)	7
Mustafo Akhmedov (TJK)	5
Amandyk Bakeyev (KAZ)	4
Sanzhar Doszhanov (KAZ)	4
Ernazar Akmataliev (KGZ)	5

Round of 16
Ali Akbar Fazli (IRI)	4
Jordan Oliver (USA)	2
Gankhuyagiin Khanbürged (MGL)	0
James Green (USA)	11
Viktor Rassadin (RWF)	4
Mustafo Akhmedov (TJK)	2
Ernazar Akmataliev (KGZ)	10
Anthony Ashnault (USA)	3

Quarterfinals
Ali Akbar Fazli (IRI)	0
James Green (USA)	10
Viktor Rassadin (RWF)	12
Ernazar Akmataliev (KGZ)	7

Semifinals
James Green (USA)	3
Viktor Rassadin (RWF)	2

Bottom half

Round of 32
Gitinomagomed Gadzhiyev (AZE)	4
Levan Kelekhsashvili (GEO)	11
Daniel Chomanič (SVK)	0
Servet Coşkun (TUR)	6

Round of 16
Selahattin Kılıçsallayan (TUR)	0
Amir Mohammad Yazdani (IRI)	10
Levan Kelekhsashvili (GEO)	8
Cüneyt Budak (TUR)	1
Syrbaz Talgat (KAZ)	7
Servet Coşkun (TUR)	4
Zurabi Iakobishvili (GEO)	10
Mohammed Abdulkareem (KUW)	0

Quarterfinals
Amir Mohammad Yazdani (IRI)	10
Levan Kelekhsashvili (GEO)	0
Syrbaz Talgat (KAZ)	2
Zurabi Iakobishvili (GEO)	7

Semifinals
Amir Mohammad Yazdani (IRI)	3
Zurabi Iakobishvili (GEO)	1

Repechage round 2
Gankhuyagiin Khanbürged (MGL)	4
Ali Akbar Fazli (IRI)	11
Selahattin Kılıçsallayan (TUR)	2
Levan Kelekhsashvili (GEO)	4

Bronze medals
Ali Akbar Fazli (IRI)	4
Viktor Rassadin (RWF)	8^{F}
Levan Kelekhsashvili (GEO)	1
Zurabi Iakobishvili (GEO)	2

==== Men's freestyle 74 kg ====
Legend

- F — Won by fall

Final
Fazlı Eryılmaz (TUR)	0
Soner Demirtaş (TUR)	9

Top half

Round of 32
Soslan Tigiyev (AZE)	4
Joey Lavallee (USA)	2

Round of 16
Asomiddin Hasanov (UZB)	2
Pritam (IND)	12
Soslan Tigiyev (AZE)	10
Shynggys Mukhametkaliyev (KAZ)	5
Zurab Kapraev (ROU)	0
Fazlı Eryılmaz (TUR)	4
Islambek Orozbekov (KGZ)	4^{F}
Maxim Vasilioglo (ROU)	2

Quarterfinals
Pritam (IND)	13
Soslan Tigiyev (AZE)	10
Fazlı Eryılmaz (TUR)	4
Islambek Orozbekov (KGZ)	3

Semifinals
Pritam (IND)	1
Fazlı Eryılmaz (TUR)	11

Bottom half

Round of 32
Abdullah Abdulkareem (KUW)	0
Mohammad Sadegh Firouzpour (IRI)	10

Round of 16
Mitch Finesilver (ISR)	4
Samet Ak (TUR)	4
Soner Demirtaş (TUR)	7
Zandanbudyn Sumiyaabazar (MGL)	0
Nurkozha Kaipanov (KAZ)	2
Mohammad Sadegh Firouzpour (IRI)	2
Nurlan Bekzhanov (KAZ)	5
Bat-Erdeniin Byambadorj (MGL)	1

Quarterfinals
Mitch Finesilver (ISR)	0
Soner Demirtaş (TUR)	5
Mohammad Sadegh Firouzpour (IRI)	11
Nurlan Bekzhanov (KAZ)	2

Semifinals
Soner Demirtaş (TUR)	5
Mohammad Sadegh Firouzpour (IRI)	1

Repechage round 2
Zurab Kapraev (ROU)	0
Islambek Orozbekov (KGZ)	6
Zandanbudyn Sumiyaabazar (MGL)	3
Mitch Finesilver (ISR)	1

Bronze medals
Islambek Orozbekov (KGZ)	11
Pritam (IND)	0
Zandanbudyn Sumiyaabazar (MGL)	WO
Mohammad Sadegh Firouzpour (IRI)

==== Men's freestyle 79 kg ====
Legend

- F — Won by fall
- R — Retired

Final
Jordan Burroughs (USA)	8
Chance Marsteller (USA)	0

Top half

Round of 32
Meir Koshkinbaev (KAZ)	0
Jordan Burroughs (USA)	14
Gourav Baliyan (IND)	3
Vladimeri Gamkrelidze (GEO)	13
Saifedine Alekma (FRA)	5
Daulet Yergesh (KAZ)	6

Round of 16
Alans Amirovs (LAT)	0
Gadzhimurad Alikhmaev (RWF)	0
Jordan Burroughs (USA)	10
Zhiger Zakirov (KAZ)	0
Gadzhimurad Omarov (AZE)	2
Vladimeri Gamkrelidze (GEO)	7
Daulet Yergesh (KAZ)	2
Ali Savadkouhi (IRI)	13

Quarterfinals
Gadzhimurad Alikhmaev (RWF)	1
Jordan Burroughs (USA)	4
Vladimeri Gamkrelidze (GEO)	1
Ali Savadkouhi (IRI)	10^{F}

Semifinals
Jordan Burroughs (USA)	2
Ali Savadkouhi (IRI)	1

Bottom half

Round of 32
David McFadden (USA)	7
Chance Marsteller (USA)	10
Jakub Sýkora (SVK)	1
Arsalan Budazhapov (KGZ)	11

Round of 16
Nuri Temur (TUR)	3
Abdullah Aslan (TUR)	2
Chance Marsteller (USA)	10
Khetag Tsabolov (SRB)	5
Muhammed Akdeniz (TUR)	3
Arsalan Budazhapov (KGZ)	6
Iakub Shikhdzamalov (ROU)	8
Giorgi Sulava (GEO)	4^{F}

Quarterfinals
Nuri Temur (TUR)	2
Chance Marsteller (USA)	5
Arsalan Budazhapov (KGZ)	12
Giorgi Sulava (GEO)	8

Semifinals
Chance Marstellerr (USA)	6
Arsalan Budazhapov (KGZ)	3

Repechage round 1
Meir Koshkinbaev (KAZ)	3
Zhiger Zakirov (KAZ)	4
David McFadden (USA)	12
Khetag Tsabolov (SRB)	6

Repechage round 2
Zhiger Zakirov (KAZ)	2
Gadzhimurad Alikhmaev (RWF)	6
David McFadden (USA)	5
Nuri Temur (TUR)	5

Bronze medals
Gadzhimurad Alikhmaev (RWF)	4
Ali Savadkouhi (IRI)	8
Nuri Temur (TUR)	1^{R}
Arsalan Budazhapov (KGZ)	6

==== Men's freestyle 86 kg ====
Legend

- F — Won by fall
- WO — Won by walkover

Final
Osman Göçen (TUR)	8
Fatih Erdin (TUR)	5

Top half

Round of 32
Nurtilek Karypbaev (KGZ)	2
Osman Göçen (TUR)	9
Mendbilegiin Temüüjin (MGL)	3
Tarzan Maisuradze (GEO)	9

Round of 16
Akhmed Aibuev (FRA)	11
Saiakbai Usupov (KGZ)	4
Osman Göçen (TUR)	5
Ivars Samušonoks (LAT)	5
Mark Hall (USA)	5
Tarzan Maisuradze (GEO)	8
Maksat Satybaldy (KAZ)	4
Bekzod Abdurakhmonov (UZB)	9

Quarterfinals
Akhmed Aibuev (FRA)	5
Osman Göçen (TUR)	12
Tarzan Maisuradze (GEO)	1
Bekzod Abdurakhmonov (UZB)	8

Semifinals
Osman Göçen (TUR)	10
Bekzod Abdurakhmonov (UZB)	0

Bottom half

Round of 32
Gadzhimurad Magomedsaidov (AZE)	1
Fatih Erdin (TUR)	3
Ahmet Batuhan Kış (TUR)	12
Ali Mansouri (IRI)	9^{F}

Round of 16
Mojtaba Asghari (IRI)	7
Byambasürengiin Bat-Erdene (MGL)	0
Fatih Erdin (TUR)	WO
~~Azamat Dauletbekov (KAZ)~~
Sandeep Singh Maan (IND)	5
Ali Mansouri (IRI)	10^{F}
Abylaikhan Nursultanov (KAZ)	2
Lars Schäfle (GER)	9

Quarterfinals
Mojtaba Asghari (IRI)	6
Fatih Erdin (TUR)	8
Ali Mansouri (IRI)	6
Lars Schäfle (GER)	8

Semifinals
Fatih Erdin (TUR)	4
Lars Schäfle (GER)	2

Repechage round 1
Nurtilek Karypbaev (KGZ)	3
Ivars Samušonoks (LAT)	1
Gadzhimurad Magomedsaidov (AZE)	WO
~~Azamat Dauletbekov (KAZ)~~

Repechage round 2
Nurtilek Karypbaev (KGZ)	0
Akhmed Aibuev (FRA)	6
Gadzhimurad Magomedsaidov (AZE)	10
Mojtaba Asghari (IRI)	0

Bronze medals
Akhmed Aibuev (FRA)	4
Bekzod Abdurakhmonov (UZB)	4
Gadzhimurad Magomedsaidov (AZE)	7
Lars Schäfle (GER)	0

==== Men's freestyle 92 kg ====
Legend

- F — Won by fall

1/8 finals
Vicky Chahar (IND)	5
Omar Zhumash (KAZ)	1
Mirlan Chynybekov (KGZ)	1
Ahmad Bazri (IRI)	12
Deepak Punia (IND)	4
Shamil Zubairov (AZE)	2
Ahmet Bilici (TUR)	5
Samet Özarslan (TUR)	2
Guram Chertkoev (RWF)	10
Adilet Davlumbayev (KAZ)	5

Quarterfinals
Elkhan Asadov (KAZ)	9
Vicky Chahar (IND)	4
Ahmad Bazri (IRI)	2
Deepak Punia (IND)	0
Erhan Yaylacı (TUR)	16
Ahmet Bilici (TUR)	8
Guram Chertkoev (RWF)	10
Miriani Maisuradze (GEO)	5

Semifinals
Elkhan Asadov (KAZ)	0
Ahmad Bazri (IRI)	7
Erhan Yaylacı (TUR)	13
Guram Chertkoev (RWF)	3

Final
Ahmad Bazri (IRI)	4
Erhan Yaylacı (TUR)	1

Repechage round 1
Mirlan Chynybekov (KGZ)	2
Deepak Punia (IND)	8^{F}

Bronze medal match
Deepak Punia (IND)	7
Elkhan Asadov (KAZ)	1
Ahmet Bilici (TUR)	8^{F}
Guram Chertkoev (RWF)	4

==== Men's freestyle 97 kg ====
Legend

- F — Won by fall

1/8 finals
Akezhan Aitbekov (KAZ)	0
Satyawart Kadian (IND)	11
Burak Şahin (TUR)	0
Alikhan Zhabrailov (RWF)	10
Shamil Musaev (RWF)	6
Bakdaulet Almentay (KAZ)	1
Mamed Ibragimov (KAZ)	6^{F}
Oktay Çiftçi (TUR)	2
Mohammad Hossein Mohammadian (IRI)	11
Mukhammadrasul Rakhimov (UZB)	0
Givi Matcharashvili (GEO)	12
Ölziisaikhany Batzul (MGL)	1

Quarterfinals
Kollin Moore (USA)	12
Satyawart Kadian (IND)	1
Alikhan Zhabrailov (RWF)	7
Shamil Musaev (RWF)	3
Mamed Ibragimov (KAZ)	4
Mohammad Hossein Mohammadian (IRI)	16
Givi Matcharashvili (GEO)	1
Mustafa Sessiz (TUR)	4

Semifinals
Kollin Moore (USA)	2
Alikhan Zhabrailov (RWF)	8
Mohammad Hossein Mohammadian (IRI)	10
Mustafa Sessiz (TUR)	0

Final
Alikhan Zhabrailov (RWF)	3
Mohammad Hossein Mohammadian (IRI)	4

Repechage round 1
Burak Şahin (TUR)	WO
Shamil Musaev (RWF)
Mukhammadrasul Rakhimov (UZB)	4
Mamed Ibragimov (KAZ)	6

Bronze medal match
Burak Şahin (TUR)	1
Kollin Moore (USA)	3
Mamed Ibragimov (KAZ)	3
Mustafa Sessiz (TUR)	2

==== Men's freestyle 125 kg ====
Legend

- F — Won by fall

Final
Taha Akgül (TUR)	10
Mönkhtöriin Lkhagvagerel (MGL)	0

Top half

Round of 32
Gabriel Tysz (SVK)	0
Taha Akgül (TUR)	11
Dániel Ligeti (HUN)	10
Muzafar Zhappuev (KGZ)	0
Hamza Özkaradeniz (TUR)	7
Sardorbek Kholmatov (UZB)	6

Round of 16
Oleg Boltin (KAZ)	2^{F}
Shivraj Rakshe (IND)	1
Taha Akgül (TUR)	7
Magomedgadzhi Nurasulov (SRB)	2
Jere Heino (FIN)	0
Dániel Ligeti (HUN)	6
Hamza Özkaradeniz (TUR)	9
Salim Ercan (TUR)	17

Quarterfinals
Oleg Boltin (KAZ)	1
Taha Akgül (TUR)	6
Dániel Ligeti (HUN)	13
Salim Ercan (TUR)	5

Semifinals
Taha Akgül (TUR)	3
Dániel Ligeti (HUN)	0

Bottom half

Round of 32
Vitalii Goloev (RWF)	6
Atsamaz Tebloev (RWF)	9
Khasanboy Rakhimov (UZB)	8
Alisher Yergali (KAZ)	4

Round of 16
Hayden Zillmer (USA)	0
Nick Gwiazdowski (USA)	3
Atsamaz Tebloev (RWF)	5
Johannes Ludescher (AUT)	1
Gennadij Cudinovic (GER)	8^{F}
Khasanboy Rakhimov (UZB)	1
Mönkhtöriin Lkhagvagerel (MGL)	2
Yusup Batirmurzaev (KAZ)	1

Quarterfinals
Nick Gwiazdowski (USA)	4
Atsamaz Tebloev (RWF)	6
Gennadij Cudinovic (GER)	1
Mönkhtöriin Lkhagvagerel (MGL)	6

Semifinals
Atsamaz Tebloev (RWF)	3
Mönkhtöriin Lkhagvagerel (MGL)	4

Repechage round 1
Gabriel Tysz (SVK)	2
Magomedgadzhi Nurasulov (SRB)	12

Repechage round 2
Magomedgadzhi Nurasulov (SRB)	7
Oleg Boltin (KAZ)	5
Yusup Batirmurzaev (KAZ)	4^{F}
Gennadij Cudinovic (GER)	0

Bronze medals
Magomedgadzhi Nurasulov (SRB)	2
Dániel Ligeti (HUN)	2
Yusup Batirmurzaev (KAZ)	7^{F}
Atsamaz Tebloev (RWF)	0

=== Women's freestyle ===
==== Women's freestyle 50 kg ====
Legend

- F — Won by fall

Final
Polina Lukina (RWF)	8
Alina Vuc (ROU)	7^{F}

Top half

Round of 32
Nadezhda Sokolova (RWF)	10
Svetlana Ankicheva (KAZ)	0
Miglena Selishka (BUL)	10
Agata Walerzak (POL)	0
Sarra Hamdi (TUN)	6
Turkan Nasirova (AZE)	0

Round of 16
Aigul Nuralim (KAZ)	2
Jasmina Immaeva (UZB)	12
Nadezhda Sokolova (RWF)	10
Aynur Erge (TUR)	0
Gabija Dilytė (LTU)	0
Miglena Selishka (BUL)	6^{F}
Sarra Hamdi (TUN)	3
Polina Lukina (RWF)	11

Quarterfinals
Jasmina Immaeva (UZB)	5
Nadezhda Sokolova (RWF)	4
Miglena Selishka (BUL)	10
Polina Lukina (RWF)	9^{F}

Semifinals
Jasmina Immaeva (UZB)	11
Polina Lukina (RWF)	20

Bottom half

Round of 32
Alina Vuc (ROU)	7^{F}
Emine Çataloğlu (TUR)	1
Weronika Sikora (POL)	11
Kseniya Stankevich (BWF)	7
Shivani Pawar (IND)	4
Anna Łukasiak (POL)	11
Kamila Barbosa (BRA)	2
Dolgorjavyn Otgonjargal (MGL)	12

Round of 16
Evin Demirhan (TUR)	1
Alina Vuc (ROU)	6
Weronika Sikora (POL)	4
Amy Fearnside (USA)	14^{F}
Anzhelika Fedorova (RWF)	2
Anna Łukasiak (POL)	4
Dolgorjavyn Otgonjargal (MGL)	10
Erin Golston (USA)	0

Quarterfinals
Alina Vuc (ROU)	10
Amy Fearnside (USA)	5
Anna Łukasiak (POL)	4
Dolgorjavyn Otgonjargal (MGL)	6

Semifinals
Alina Vuc (ROU)	6^{F}
Dolgorjavyn Otgonjargal (MGL)	0

Repechage round 1
Emine Çataloğlu (TUR)	0
Evin Demirhan (TUR)	2^{F}

Repechage round 2
Sarra Hamdi (TUN)	4
Miglena Selishka (BUL)	5
Evin Demirhan (TUR)	12
Amy Fearnside (USA)	14

Bronze medals
Miglena Selishka (BUL)	6^{F}
Jasmina Immaeva (UZB)	0
Amy Fearnside (USA)	4
Dolgorjavyn Otgonjargal (MGL)	12^{F}

==== Women's freestyle 53 kg ====
Legend

- F — Won by fall

Final
Milana Dadasheva (RWF)	8
Bat-Ochiryn Bolortuyaa (MGL)	13^{F}

Top half

Round of 32
Anzhelika Vetoshkina (RWF)	1
Jonna Malmgren (SWE)	8^{F}

Round of 16
Annika Wendle (GER)	7^{F}
Sıla Aykul (TUR)	0
Jonna Malmgren (SWE)	4
Iulia Leorda (MDA)	6^{F}
Zhuldyz Eshimova (KAZ)	3
Tatyana Varansova (AZE)	1
Milana Dadasheva (RWF)	9
Esra Pul (TUR)	2

Quarterfinals
Annika Wendle (GER)	4
Iulia Leorda (MDA)	6
Zhuldyz Eshimova (KAZ)	5
Milana Dadasheva (RWF)	5

Semifinals
Iulia Leorda (MDA)	4
Milana Dadasheva (RWF)	4^{F}

Bottom half

Round of 32
Ellada Makhyaddinova (KAZ)	2
Dominique Parrish (USA)	6

Round of 16
Pooja Gehlot (IND)	1
Bat-Ochiryn Bolortuyaa (MGL)	11
Aktenge Keunimjaeva (UZB)	WO
~~Assylzat Sagymbay (KAZ)~~
Leila Karymova (RWF)	4
Dominique Parrish (USA)	6
Semanur Kanlı (TUR)	0
Katsiaryna Pichkouskaya (BWF)	6^{F}

Quarterfinals
Bat-Ochiryn Bolortuyaa (MGL)	11
Aktenge Keunimjaeva (UZB)	0
Dominique Parrish (USA)	5
Katsiaryna Pichkouskaya (BWF)	0

Semifinals
Bat-Ochiryn Bolortuyaa (MGL)	4^{F}
Dominique Parrish (USA)	8

Repechage round 2
Esra Pul (TUR)	0
Zhuldyz Eshimova (KAZ)	10
Pooja Gehlot (IND)	8
Aktenge Keunimjaeva (UZB)	1

Bronze medal match
Zhuldyz Eshimova (KAZ)	0
Iulia Leorda (MDA)	5
Pooja Gehlot (IND)	2
Dominique Parrish (USA)	6^{F}

==== Women's freestyle 55 kg ====
Legend

- F — Won by fall
- R — Retired

1/8 finals
Mehlika Öztürk (TUR)	2
Anju (IND)	13
Jacarra Winchester (USA)	11
Aisha Kappar (KAZ)	0
Ekaterina Isakova (RWF)	6^{F}
Nur Çınar (TUR)	0
Ainur Ashimova (KAZ)	10
Laura Stanelytė (LTU)	0
Katarzyna Krawczyk (POL)	6
Altyn Shagayeva (KAZ)	0
Aleksandra Skirenko (RWF)	4^{F}
Sinem Köroğlu (TUR)	0

Quarterfinals
Vinesh Phogat (IND)	8
Anju (IND)	7
Jacarra Winchester (USA)	9
Ekaterina Isakova (RWF)	5
Ainur Ashimova (KAZ)	0^{R}
Katarzyna Krawczyk (POL)	8
Aleksandra Skirenko (RWF)	8^{F}
Tatiana Novik (RWF)	5

Semifinals
Vinesh Phogat (IND)	3
Jacarra Winchester (USA)	7^{F}
Katarzyna Krawczyk (POL)	10
Aleksandra Skirenko (RWF)	4

Final
Jacarra Winchester (USA)	7
Katarzyna Krawczyk (POL)	4

Repechage round 1
Aisha Kappar (KAZ)	0
Ekaterina Isakova (RWF)	4^{F}
Altyn Shagayeva (KAZ)	WO
Ainur Ashimova (KAZ)

Bronze medal match
Ekaterina Isakova (RWF)	12^{F}
Vinesh Phogat (IND)	5
Altyn Shagayeva (KAZ)	4
Aleksandra Skirenko (RWF)	5^{F}

==== Women's freestyle 57 kg ====
Legend

- F — Won by fall

Final
Evelina Nikolova (BUL)	4^{F}
Khürelkhüügiin Bolortuyaa (MGL)	6

Top half

Round of 32
Evelina Nikolova (BUL)	4^{F}
Özge Fındıkçı (TUR)	0
Alicja Czyżowicz (POL)	0
Iryna Kurachkina (BWF)	4^{F}
Sandra Paruszewski (GER)	10^{F}
Derya Bayhan (TUR)	0

Round of 16
Hanna Vaher (BWF)	8
Esther Kolawole (NGR)	10^{F}
Evelina Nikolova (BUL)	4^{F}
Aisha Ualishan (KAZ)	0
Irina Ologonova (RWF)	0
Iryna Kurachkina (BWF)	5
Sandra Paruszewski (GER)	7
Shokhida Akhmedova (UZB)	2

Quarterfinals
Esther Kolawole (NGR)	6
Evelina Nikolova (BUL)	10
Iryna Kurachkina (BWF)	8
Sandra Paruszewski (GER)	5

Semifinals
Evelina Nikolova (BUL)	6^{F}
Iryna Kurachkina (BWF)	6

Bottom half

Round of 32
Emma Tissina (KAZ)	5
Bediha Gün (TUR)	3
Mansi Ahlawat (IND)	7
Olga Khoroshavtseva (RWF)	0
Jenna Hemiä (FIN)	0
Elena Brugger (GER)	10

Round of 16
Anhelina Lysak (POL)	8^{F}
Emma Tissina (KAZ)	0
Mansi Ahlawat (IND)	4
Giullia Penalber (BRA)	12
Khürelkhüügiin Bolortuyaa (MGL)	12
Elena Brugger (GER)	1
Veronika Chumikova (RWF)	13^{F}
Nilufar Raimova (KAZ)	0

Quarterfinals
Anhelina Lysak (POL)	7^{F}
Giullia Penalber (BRA)	5
Khürelkhüügiin Bolortuyaa (MGL)	5^{F}
Veronika Chumikova (RWF)	5

Semifinals
Anhelina Lysak (POL)	1
Khürelkhüügiin Bolortuyaa (MGL)	4^{F}

Repechage round 1
Özge Fındıkçı (TUR)	1
Aisha Ualishan (KAZ)	4

Repechage round 2
Aisha Ualishan (KAZ)	0
Esther Kolawole (NGR)	4^{F}
Elena Brugger (GER)	6
Veronika Chumikova (RWF)	10

Bronze medals
Esther Kolawole (NGR)	3
Iryna Kurachkina (BWF)	8
Veronika Chumikova (RWF)	7
Anhelina Lysak (POL)	6

==== Women's freestyle 59 kg ====
Legend

- F — Won by fall

1/8 finals
Alyona Kolesnik (AZE)	0
Anastasia Nichita (MDA)	2^{F}
Elif Yanık (TUR)	4^{F}
Sophia Mirabella (USA)	2
Diana Kayumova (KAZ)	1
Nurife Duman (TUR)	2
Madina Aman (KAZ)	1
Kateryna Zhydachevska (ROU)	12
Jowita Wrzesień (POL)	4
Sarita Mor (IND)	3
Anastasiia Iakovleva (RWF)	3
Michaela Beck (USA)	2
Aizhan Ismagulova (KAZ)	6^{F}
Elmas Çelik (TUR)	0
Zhargalma Tsyrempilova (RWF)	8
Zelfira Sadraddinova (RWF)	0

Quarterfinals
Anastasia Nichita (MDA)	4^{F}
Elif Yanık (TUR)	0
Nurife Duman (TUR)	2
Kateryna Zhydachevska (ROU)	7
Jowita Wrzesień (POL)	7
Anastasiia Iakovleva (RWF)	3
Aizhan Ismagulova (KAZ)	4
Zhargalma Tsyrempilova (RWF)	4^{F}

Semifinals
Anastasia Nichita (MDA)	10
Kateryna Zhydachevska (ROU)	0
Jowita Wrzesień (POL)	1
Zhargalma Tsyrempilova (RWF)	4

Final
Anastasia Nichita (MDA)	10
Zhargalma Tsyrempilova (RWF)	0

Repechage round 1
Alyona Kolesnik (AZE)	WO
Elif Yanık (TUR)
Zelfira Sadraddinova (RWF)	9
Aizhan Ismagulova (KAZ)	6

Bronze medal match
Alyona Kolesnik (AZE)	8
Kateryna Zhydachevska (ROU)	2
Zelfira Sadraddinova (RWF)	0
Jowita Wrzesień (POL)	4

==== Women's freestyle 62 kg ====
Legend

- F — Won by fall

Final
Sükheegiin Tserenchimed (MGL)	12
Macey Kilty (USA)	0

Top half

Round of 32
Sakshi Malik (IND)	10
Ebru Yılmaz (TUR)	0
Laís Nunes (BRA)	11
Anastasiia Parokhina (RWF)	8
Natalia Kubaty (POL)	0
Marwa Amri (TUN)	7

Round of 16
Taybe Yusein (BUL)	4
Sükheegiin Tserenchimed (MGL)	7^{F}
Sakshi Malik (IND)	6
Luisa Niemesch (GER)	5
Aisuluu Tynybekova (KGZ)	0
Laís Nunes (BRA)	8
Marwa Amri (TUN)	2^{F}
Hatice Ece Tekin (TUR)	0

Quarterfinals
Sükheegiin Tserenchimed (MGL)	11^{F}
Sakshi Malik (IND)	2
Laís Nunes (BRA)	0
Marwa Amri (TUN)	10

Semifinals
Sükheegiin Tserenchimed (MGL)	11
Marwa Amri (TUN)	0

Bottom half

Round of 32
Veranika Ivanova (BWF)	12
Irina Kuznetsova (KAZ)	2
Nabira Esenbaeva (UZB)	0
Bilyana Dudova (BUL)	11
Rushana Abdirasulova (UZB)	1
Gamze Nur Adakan (TUR)	2

Round of 16
Sangeeta Phogat (IND)	0
Veranika Ivanova (BWF)	11
Bilyana Dudova (BUL)	3
Ayaulym Kassymova (KAZ)	1
Svetlana Lipatova (RWF)	3
Gamze Nur Adakan (TUR)	0
Macey Kilty (USA)	2^{F}
Khadizhat Murtuzalieva (RWF)	0

Quarterfinals
Veranika Ivanova (BWF)	9
Bilyana Dudova (BUL)	0
Svetlana Lipatova (RWF)	5
Macey Kilty (USA)	10

Semifinals
Veranika Ivanova (BWF)	2
Macey Kilty (USA)	14

Repechage round 2
Taybe Yusein (BUL)	10
Sakshi Malik (IND)	0
Khadizhat Murtuzalieva (RWF)	0
Svetlana Lipatova (RWF)	4

Bronze medals
Taybe Yusein (BUL)	4
Marwa Amri (TUN)	5
Svetlana Lipatova (RWF)	6
Veranika Ivanova (BWF)	5

==== Women's freestyle 65 kg ====
Legend

- F — Won by fall

Final
Mallory Velte (USA)	4
Forrest Molinari (USA)	7

Top half

Round of 32
Kriszta Incze (ROU)	9^{F}
Dariga Aben (KAZ)	0

Round of 16
Aslı Tuğcu (TUR)	1
Uliana Tukurenova (RWF)	3
Kriszta Incze (ROU)	WO
~~Nisha Dahiya (IND)~~
Mallory Velte (USA)	10
Madina Bakbergenova (KAZ)	0
Ariukhan Jumabaeva (UZB)	3
Khadija Jlassi (TUN)	4^{F}

Quarterfinals
Uliana Tukurenova (RWF)	3
Kriszta Incze (ROU)	3
Mallory Velte (USA)	10
Khadija Jlassi (TUN)	0

Semifinals
Uliana Tukurenova (RWF)	0
Mallory Velte (USA)	7

Bottom half

Round of 32

Round of 16
Derya Nur Karaduman (TUR)	0
Forrest Molinari (USA)	2^{F}
Emma Bruntil (USA)	10
Dinara Salikhova (RWF)	0
Gülsüm Bingöl (TUR)	0
Elis Manolova (AZE)	11
Maria Kuznetsova (RWF)	12
Sofiya Georgieva (BUL)	1

Quarterfinals
Forrest Molinari (USA)	9^{F}
Emma Bruntil (USA)	2
Elis Manolova (AZE)	6
Maria Kuznetsova (RWF)	5

Semifinals
Forrest Molinari (USA)	5
Elis Manolova (AZE)	3

Repechage round 2
Madina Bakbergenova (KAZ)	1
Khadija Jlassi (TUN)	3^{F}
Derya Nur Karaduman (TUR)	0
Emma Bruntil (USA)	10

Bronze medal match
Khadija Jlassi (TUN)	4^{F}
Uliana Tukurenova (RWF)	0
Emma Bruntil (USA)	3
Elis Manolova (AZE)	2

==== Women's freestyle 68 kg ====
Legend

- F — Won by fall

1/8 finals
Solin Piearcy (USA)	0
Khanum Velieva (RWF)	10
Blessing Oborududu (NGR)	10
Zuzanna Wólczyńska (POL)	0
Havva Duran (TUR)	0
Ritu Malik (IND)	8^{F}

Quarterfinals
Azoda Esbergenova (UZB)	0
Khanum Velieva (RWF)	10
Meerim Zhumanazarova (KGZ)	4^{F}
Tatiana Smoliak (RWF)	0
Albina Kairgeldinova (KAZ)	0
Blessing Oborududu (NGR)	11
Ritu Malik (IND)	0
Adéla Hanzlíčková (CZE)	10

Semifinals
Khanum Velieva (RWF)	5
Meerim Zhumanazarova (KGZ)	5
Blessing Oborududu (NGR)	9
Adéla Hanzlíčková (CZE)	0

Final
Meerim Zhumanazarova (KGZ)	0
Blessing Oborududu (NGR)	3

Repechage round 1
Zuzanna Wólczyńska (POL)	2
Albina Kairgeldinova (KAZ)	8^{F}

Bronze medal match
Tatiana Smoliak (RWF)	0
Khanum Velieva (RWF)	10
Albina Kairgeldinova (KAZ)	0
Adéla Hanzlíčková (CZE)	11

==== Women's freestyle 72 kg ====
Legend

- F — Won by fall

1/8 finals
Zhamila Bakbergenova (KAZ)	10
Danutė Domikaitytė (LTU)	0
Buse Tosun (TUR)	12
Alexandra Zaitseva (KAZ)	2

Quarterfinals
Vahide Gök (TUR)	0
Zhamila Bakbergenova (KAZ)	9
Nazar Batır (TUR)	0
Ksenia Burakova (RWF)	6^{F}
Alexandra Anghel (ROU)	1
Anna Schell (GER)	7^{F}
Buse Tosun (TUR)	4
Pinki (IND)	2

Semifinals
Zhamila Bakbergenova (KAZ)	8
Ksenia Burakova (RWF)	4
Anna Schell (GER)	15
Buse Tosun (TUR)	13

Final
Zhamila Bakbergenova (KAZ)	8
Anna Schell (GER)	2

Repechage round 1
Danutė Domikaitytė (LTU)	4^{F}
Vahide Gök (TUR)	0

Bronze medal match
Danutė Domikaitytė (LTU)	4^{F}
Ksenia Burakova (RWF)	0
Alexandra Anghel (ROU)	5
Buse Tosun (TUR)	3

==== Women's freestyle 76 kg ====
Legend

- F — Won by fall

Final
Martina Kuenz (AUT)	4
Aiperi Medet Kyzy (KGZ)	6

Top half

Round of 32
Gursharan Preet Kaur (IND)	3
Kamilė Gaučaitė (LTU)	2
Melike Közgün (TUR)	0
Martina Kuenz (AUT)	6^{F}

Round of 16
Gulmaral Yerkebayeva (KAZ)	11
Beste Civelek (TUR)	0
Gursharan Preet Kaur (IND)	6
Samar Amer (EGY)	9
Victoria Francis (USA)	2
Martina Kuenz (AUT)	10
Cătălina Axente (ROU)	4
Rita Talismanova (RWF)	2

Quarterfinals
Gulmaral Yerkebayeva (KAZ)	10
Samar Amer (EGY)	4
Martina Kuenz (AUT)	5
Cătălina Axente (ROU)	3

Semifinals
Gulmaral Yerkebayeva (KAZ)	6
Martina Kuenz (AUT)	9

Bottom half

Round of 32
Mariya Oryashkova (BUL)	11
Patrycja Sperka (POL)	0
Ayşegül Özbege (TUR)	0
Ekaterina Bukina (RWF)	10

Round of 16
Francy Rädelt (GER)	5^{F}
Svetlana Oknazarova (UZB)	0
Mariya Oryashkova (BUL)	3
Kseniya Dzibuk (BWF)	2
Precious Bell (USA)	1
Ekaterina Bukina (RWF)	12
Aiperi Medet Kyzy (KGZ)	10
Kristina Shumova (RWF)	0

Quarterfinals
Francy Rädelt (GER)	11
Mariya Oryashkova (BUL)	0
Ekaterina Bukina (RWF)	3
Aiperi Medet Kyzy (KGZ)	5

Semifinals
Francy Rädelt (GER)	1
Aiperi Medet Kyzy (KGZ)	6

Repechage round 1
Melike Közgün (TUR)	0
Victoria Francis (USA)	4^{F}

Repechage round 2
Victoria Francis (USA)	2
Cătălina Axente (ROU)	1
Kristina Shumova (RWF)	0
Ekaterina Bukina (RWF)	10

Bronze medals
Victoria Francis (USA)	1
Gulmaral Yerkebayeva (KAZ)	5
Ekaterina Bukina (RWF)	10
Francy Rädelt (GER)	13
