= 2022 World Wrestling Championships – Women's freestyle 59 kg =

Wrestling competitions

Women's freestyle 59 kg at the 2022 World Championships
- Venue: Štark Arena
- Dates: 14–15 September 2022
- Competitors: 14 from 14 nations

Medalists
gold medal	Anastasia Nichita	Moldova
silver medal	Grace Bullen	Norway
bronze medal	Jowita Wrzesień	Poland
bronze medal	Sakura Motoki	Japan

The women's freestyle 59 kilograms is a competition featured at the 2022 World Wrestling Championships, and was held in Štark Arena, Belgrade, Serbia on 14 and 15 September 2022. The qualification rounds were held on 14 September while medal matches were held on the 2nd day of the competition.

This freestyle wrestling competition consists of a single-elimination tournament, with a repechage used to determine the winner of two bronze medals. The two finalists face off for gold and silver medals. Each wrestler who loses to one of the two finalists moves into the repechage, culminating in a pair of bronze medal matches featuring the semifinal losers each facing the remaining repechage opponent from their half of the bracket.

European champion Anastasia Nichita of Moldova won the gold medal after edging Norway's former European champion Grace Bullen from Norway 4–1 after six minutes.

Japan's Sakura Motoki won by fall versus China's Zhang Qi in one of the bronze medal bouts, the scoreline was 7–0 at the time, while Poland's Jowita Wrzesień recorded a 4–2 victory on points over Mongolia's Bat-Erdeniin Erdenesuvd to also walk away with a bronze medal.

== Results ==
Legend

- F — Won by fall

=== Main bracket ===
Round of 16
Mansi Ahlawat (IND)	8
Solomiia Vynnyk (UKR)	5
Diana Kayumova (KAZ)	4
Bat-Erdeniin Erdenesuvd (MGL)	11
Abigail Nette (USA)	2
Grace Bullen (NOR)	13
Anastasia Nichita (MDA)	4^{F}
Laurence Beauregard (CAN)	0
Zhang Qi (CHN)	10
Elena Brugger (GER)	0
Ebru Dağbaşı (TUR)	0
Sakura Motoki (JPN)	5^{F}

Quarterfinals
Jowita Wrzesień (POL)	5
Mansi Ahlawat (IND)	3
Bat-Erdeniin Erdenesuvd (MGL)	0
Grace Bullen (NOR)	12^{F}
Anastasia Nichita (MDA)	10^{F}
Zhang Qi (CHN)	2
Sakura Motoki (JPN)	6^{F}
Alyona Kolesnik (AZE)	0

Semifinals
Jowita Wrzesień (POL)	3
Grace Bullen (NOR)	5
Anastasia Nichita (MDA)	7
Sakura Motoki (JPN)	5

Final
Grace Bullen (NOR)	1
Anastasia Nichita (MDA)	4

=== Repechage ===
Repechage round 1
Abigail Nette (USA)	0
Bat-Erdeniin Erdenesuvd (MGL)	4
Laurence Beauregard (CAN)	0
Zhang Qi (CHN)	3

Bronze medals
Bat-Erdeniin Erdenesuvd (MGL)	2
Jowita Wrzesień (POL)	4
Zhang Qi (CHN)	0
Sakura Motoki (JPN)	7^{F}

== Final standing ==
Rank	Athlete
1st place, gold medalist(s)	Anastasia Nichita (MDA)
2nd place, silver medalist(s)	Grace Bullen (NOR)
3rd place, bronze medalist(s)	Jowita Wrzesień (POL)
3rd place, bronze medalist(s)	Sakura Motoki (JPN)
5	Bat-Erdeniin Erdenesuvd (MGL)
5	Zhang Qi (CHN)
7	Mansi Ahlawat (IND)
8	Solomiia Vynnyk (UKR)
9	Diana Kayumova (KAZ)
10	Abigail Nette (USA)
11	Ebru Dağbaşı (TUR)
12	Alyona Kolesnik (AZE)
13	Laurence Beauregard (CAN)
14	Elena Brugger (GER)
