= 2022 European Wrestling Championships – Women's freestyle 59 kg =

Wrestling competition

Women's freestyle 59 kg at the 2022 European Wrestling Championships
- Venue: BOK Sports Hall
- Location: Budapest, Hungary
- Dates: 30-31 March
- Competitors: 7

Medalists
gold medal	Anastasia Nichita	Moldova
silver medal	Jowita Wrzesień	Poland
bronze medal	Elena Brugger	Germany

The women's freestyle 59 kg was a competition featured at the 2022 European Wrestling Championships, and was held in Budapest, Hungary on March 30 and 31.

== Results ==
Legend

- F — Won by fall

Elimination groups

Group A

Pos	Athlete	Pld	W	L	CP	TP
1	Alyona Kolesnik (AZE)	2	2	0	6	18
2	Elena Brugger (GER)	2	1	1	10	6
3	Elif Yanık (TUR)	2	0	2	5	0

Source: UWW

	Score		CP
Alyona Kolesnik (AZE)	8–3 Fall	Elif Yanık (TUR)	5–0 FA
Elena Brugger (GER)	4–8	Alyona Kolesnik (AZE)	1–3 PO1
Elif Yanık (TUR)	2–6 Fall	Elena Brugger (GER)	0–5 FA

Group B

Pos	Athlete	Pld	W	L	CP	TP
1	Anastasia Nichita (MDA)	3	3	0	14	12
2	Jowita Wrzesień (POL)	3	2	1	14	7
3	Morena De Vita (ITA)	3	1	2	11	6
4	Solomiia Vynnyk (UKR)	3	0	3	9	1

Source: UWW

	Score		CP
Jowita Wrzesień (POL)	2–4	Anastasia Nichita (MDA)	1–3 PO1
Solomiia Vynnyk (UKR)	6–4 Fall	Morena De Vita (ITA)	0–5 FA
Jowita Wrzesień (POL)	5–3	Solomiia Vynnyk (UKR)	3–1 PO1
Anastasia Nichita (MDA)	10–0	Morena De Vita (ITA)	4–0 SU
Anastasia Nichita (MDA)	WO	Solomiia Vynnyk (UKR)	5–0 IN
Jowita Wrzesień (POL)	7–7	Morena De Vita (ITA)	3–1 PO1

Knockout round

Semifinals
Alyona Kolesnik (AZE)	1
Jowita Wrzesień (POL)	3
Anastasia Nichita (MDA)	8
Elena Brugger (GER)	0

Finals
Jowita Wrzesień (POL)	1
Anastasia Nichita (MDA)	4
Bronze medal match
Alyona Kolesnik (AZE)	0
Elena Brugger (GER)	9

== Final standing ==
Rank	Wrestler	UWW Points
1st place, gold medalist(s)	Anastasia Nichita (MDA)	10000
2nd place, silver medalist(s)	Jowita Wrzesień (POL)	8000
3rd place, bronze medalist(s)	Elena Brugger (GER)	6500
4	Alyona Kolesnik (AZE)	5800
5	Morena De Vita (ITA)	5000
6	Solomiia Vynnyk (UKR)	4700
7	Elif Yanık (TUR)	4400
