= 2022 Golden Grand Prix Ivan Yarygin =

Ivan Yarygin 2022
- Host city: Krasnoyarsk, Russia
- Dates: 27-30 January 2022
- Stadium: Ivan Yarygin Sports Palace

The XXXIII Golden Grand Prix Ivan Yarygin 2022, also known as Ivan Yarygin (Yariguin) 2022 is a United World Wrestling freestyle wrestling international tournament, which was held in Krasnoyarsk, Russia between 27 and 30 January 2022.

== Event videos ==
The event was aired freely on the wrestlingtv.ru channel.

Broadcasting
27 January 2022 Mat 1	27 January 2022 Mat 2	27 January 2022 Mat 3
28 January 2022 Mat 1	28 January 2022 Mat 2	28 January 2022 Mat 3
29 January 2022 Mat 1	29 January 2022 Mat 2	29 January 2022 Mat 3
30 January 2022 Mat 2	30 January 2022 Mat 3	

== Medal table ==
Rank	Nation	Gold	Silver	Bronze	Total
1	Russia	4	5	7	16
2	Dagestan	3	4	8	15
3	United States	3	3	1	7
4	(North Ossetia–Alania) North Ossetia-Alania	3	2	4	9
5	Mongolia	2	2	10	14
6	Azerbaijan	1	0	1	2
7	Kazakhstan	1	0	0	1
7	Leningrad Oblast	1	0	0	1
7	Moscow Oblast	1	0	0	1
7	Sakha Republic	1	0	0	1
11	Kabardino-Balkaria	0	2	1	3
12	Belarus	0	1	0	1
12	Irkutsk Oblast	0	1	0	1
14	Krasnoyarsk Krai	0	0	3	3
15	Albania	0	0	2	2
16	Georgia	0	0	1	1
Totals (16 entries)		20	20	38	78

== Medal overview ==
=== Men's freestyle ===
Event	Gold	Silver	Bronze
57 kg	Ramiz Gamzatov; Dagestan	Akhmed Idrisov; Dagestan	Musa Mekhtikhanov; Dagestan
57 kg	Ramiz Gamzatov; Dagestan	Akhmed Idrisov; Dagestan	Azamat Tuskaev; North Ossetia
61 kg	Abasgadzhi Magomedov; Dagestan	Fedor Baltuyev; Irkutsk Oblast	Abdurakhman Rasulov; Dagestan
61 kg	Abasgadzhi Magomedov; Dagestan	Fedor Baltuyev; Irkutsk Oblast	Zelimkhan Abakarov; Albania
65 kg	Shamil Mamedov; Moscow Oblast	Ramazan Ferzaliev; Dagestan	Ibragim Ibragimov; Dagestan
65 kg	Shamil Mamedov; Moscow Oblast	Ramazan Ferzaliev; Dagestan	Islam Dudaev; Albania
70 kg	Viktor Rassadin; Yakutia	Anzor Zakuev; Kabardino-Balkaria	Kurban Shiraev; Dagestan
70 kg	Viktor Rassadin; Yakutia	Anzor Zakuev; Kabardino-Balkaria	Ruslan Zhendaev; Krasnoyarsk Krai
74 kg	Chermen Valiev; North Ossetia	Jason Nolf; United States	Magomedrasul Gazimagomedov; Dagestan
74 kg	Chermen Valiev; North Ossetia	Jason Nolf; United States	Timur Bizhoev; Kabardino-Balkaria
79 kg	Radik Valiev; North Ossetia	Malik Shavaev; Kabardino-Balkaria	Dmitry Zainidinov; Krasnoyarsk Krai
79 kg	Radik Valiev; North Ossetia	Malik Shavaev; Kabardino-Balkaria	Gadzhi Nabiev; Dagestan
86 kg	Dauren Kurugliev; Dagestan	Amanula Rasulov; Dagestan	Ada Bagomedov; Dagestan
86 kg	Dauren Kurugliev; Dagestan	Amanula Rasulov; Dagestan	Zahid Valencia; United States
92 kg	Guram Chertkoev; North Ossetia	Tamerlan Tapsiev; North Ossetia	Alan Bagaev; North Ossetia
92 kg	Guram Chertkoev; North Ossetia	Tamerlan Tapsiev; North Ossetia	Tazhudin Mukhtarov; Dagestan
97 kg	Kyle Snyder; United States	Shamil Musaev; Dagestan	Igor Ovsyannikov; Krasnoyarsk Krai
97 kg	Kyle Snyder; United States	Shamil Musaev; Dagestan	Elizbar Odikadze; Georgia
125 kg	Anzor Khizriev; Leningrad Oblast	Vitaliy Goloev; North Ossetia	Khasan Khubaev; North Ossetia
125 kg	Anzor Khizriev; Leningrad Oblast	Vitaliy Goloev; North Ossetia	Alen Khubulov; North Ossetia

=== Women's freestyle ===
Event	Gold	Silver	Bronze
50 kg	Nadezhda Sokolova; Russia	Anzhelika Fedorova; Russia	Milana Makhacheva; Russia
50 kg	Nadezhda Sokolova; Russia	Anzhelika Fedorova; Russia	Dolgorjavyn Otgonjargal; Mongolia
53 kg	Bat-Ochiryn Bolortuyaa; Mongolia	Ganbaataryn Otgonjargal; Mongolia	Batkhuyagiin Khulan; Mongolia
53 kg	Bat-Ochiryn Bolortuyaa; Mongolia	Ganbaataryn Otgonjargal; Mongolia	Leyla Karymova; Russia
55 kg	Irina Ologonova; Russia	Ekaterina Isakova; Russia	Battsoojiin Maral; Mongolia
55 kg	Irina Ologonova; Russia	Ekaterina Isakova; Russia	Erdenechimegiin Sumiyaa; Mongolia
57 kg	Helen Maroulis; United States	Olga Khoroshavtseva; Russia	Veronika Chumikova; Russia
57 kg	Helen Maroulis; United States	Olga Khoroshavtseva; Russia	Khürelkhüügiin Bolortuyaa; Mongolia
59 kg	Alyona Kolesnik; Azerbaijan	Zhargalma Tsyrenova; Russia	Amina Tandelova; Russia
59 kg	Alyona Kolesnik; Azerbaijan	Zhargalma Tsyrenova; Russia	Baatarjavyn Shoovdor; Mongolia
62 kg	Sükheegiin Tserenchimed; Mongolia	Macey Kilty; United States	Birgul Soltanova; Azerbaijan
62 kg	Sükheegiin Tserenchimed; Mongolia	Macey Kilty; United States	Alina Kasabieva; Russia
65 kg	Emma Bruntil; United States	Forrest Molinari; United States	Maria Lachugina; Russia
65 kg	Emma Bruntil; United States	Forrest Molinari; United States	Zorigtyn Bolortungalag; Mongolia
68 kg	Khanum Velieva; Russia	Tatiana Smolyak; Russia	Natalia Fedoseeva; Russia
72 kg	Ksenia Burakova; Russia	Enkh-Amaryn Davaanasan; Mongolia	Dorjsürengiin Tsogzolma; Mongolia
76 kg	Elmira Syzdykova; Kazakhstan	Kseniya Dzibuk; Belarus	Ganbatyn Ariunjargal; Mongolia
76 kg	Elmira Syzdykova; Kazakhstan	Kseniya Dzibuk; Belarus	Naigalsürengiin Zagardulam; Mongolia

== Participating nations ==
341 competitors from 11 nations participated.

- Albania (2)
- Azerbaijan (3)
- Belarus (14)
- Georgia (3)
- Kazakhstan (30)
- Kyrgyzstan (15)
- Moldova (3)
- Mongolia (37)
- Russia (220)
- Tajikistan (1)
- United States (13)
