= 2020 Individual Wrestling World Cup – Women's freestyle 57 kg =

The Women's freestyle 57 kg is a competition featured at the 2020 Individual Wrestling World Cup, and was held in Belgrade, Serbia on 15 and 16 December 2020.

== Medalists ==
Gold	Anastasia Nichita; Moldova
Silver	Anshu Malik; India
Bronze	Mehlika Öztürk; Turkey
Bronze	Veronika Chumikova; Russia

== Results ==
Legend

- F — Won by fall

1/8 finals
Arianna Carieri (ITA)	2
Antonyna Kuchina (UKR)	1
Joseph Essombe (CMR)	2
Veronika Chumikova (RUS)	6^{F}
Nuraida Anarkulova (KGZ)	4
Patrycja Gil (POL)	8
Laura Mertens (GER)	10
Victoria Báez-Dilone (ESP)	0
Anshu Malik (IND)	4
Alyona Kolesnik (AZE)	2

Quarterfinals
Evelina Nikolova (BUL)	4
Mehlika Öztürk (TUR)	5
Anastasia Nichita (MDA)	10^{F}
Arianna Carieri (ITA)	0
Veronika Chumikova (RUS)	10
Patrycja Gil (POL)	0
Laura Mertens (GER)	1
Anshu Malik (IND)	3

Semifinals
Mehlika Öztürk (TUR)	5
Anastasia Nichita (MDA)	15
Veronika Chumikova (RUS)	4
Anshu Malik (IND)	7^{F}

Final
Anastasia Nichita (MDA)	5
Anshu Malik (IND)	1

Repechage round 1
Alyona Kolesnik (AZE)	4
Laura Mertens (GER)	1

Bronze medals
Arianna Carieri (ITA)	0
Mehlika Öztürk (TUR)	5^{F}
Alyona Kolesnik (AZE)	2
Veronika Chumikova (RUS)	2
