= Wrestling at the 2020 Summer Olympics – Women's freestyle 57 kg =

Women's freestyle 57 kg at the Games of the XXXII Olympiad
- Venue: Makuhari Messe
- Date: 4–5 August 2021
- Competitors: 16 from 16 nations

Medalists
| 1st place, gold medalist(s) | | Risako Kawai | Japan |
| 2nd place, silver medalist(s) | | Iryna Kurachkina | Belarus |
| 3rd place, bronze medalist(s) | | Helen Maroulis | United States |
| 3rd place, bronze medalist(s) | | Evelina Nikolova | Bulgaria |

The women's freestyle 57 kilograms competition at the 2020 Summer Olympics in Tokyo, Japan, took place on 4–5 August 2021 at the Makuhari Messe in Mihama-ku.

This freestyle wrestling competition consists of a single-elimination tournament, with a repechage used to determine the winner of two bronze medals. The two finalists face off for gold and silver medals. Each wrestler who loses to one of the two finalists moves into the repechage, culminating in a pair of bronze medal matches featuring the semifinal losers each facing the remaining repechage opponent from their half of the bracket.

== Schedule ==
All times are Japan Standard Time (UTC+09:00)

| Date | Time | Event |
|---|---|---|
| 4 August 2021 | 11:00 | Qualification rounds |
| 4 August 2021 | 18:15 | Semifinals |
| 5 August 2021 | 11:00 | Repechage |
| 5 August 2021 | 19:30 | Finals |

== Results ==
Legend

- F — Won by fall
- R — Retired

=== Main bracket ===
1/8 finals
Risako Kawai (JPN) | 8
Fatoumata Camara (GUI) | 2
Boldsaikhan Khongorzul (MGL) | 7
Mathilde Rivière (FRA) | 5^{R}
Tetyana Kit (UKR) | 2^{F}
Siwar Bousetta (TUN) | 0
Helen Maroulis (USA) | 8
Rong Ningning (CHN) | 4
Iryna Kurachkina (BLR) | 8
Anshu Malik (IND) | 2
Alma Valencia (MEX) | 2
Valeria Koblova (ROC) | 5
Jowita Wrzesień (POL) | 0
Evelina Nikolova (BUL) | 3
Anastasia Nichita (MDA) | 2^{F}
Odunayo Adekuoroye (NGR) | 8

1/4 finals
Risako Kawai (JPN) | 7
Boldsaikhan Khongorzul (MGL) | 0
Tetyana Kit (UKR) | 0
Helen Maroulis (USA) | 8
Iryna Kurachkina (BLR) | 6
Valeria Koblova (ROC) | 3
Evelina Nikolova (BUL) | 6
Anastasia Nichita (MDA) | 3

Semifinals
Risako Kawai (JPN) | 2
Helen Maroulis (USA) | 1
Iryna Kurachkina (BLR) | 11
Evelina Nikolova (BUL) | 0

Final
Risako Kawai (JPN) | 5
Iryna Kurachkina (BLR) | 0

=== Repechage ===
Repechage
Fatoumata Camara (GUI) | 0
Boldsaikhan Khongorzul (MGL) | 10
Anshu Malik (IND) | 1
Valeria Koblova (ROC) | 5

Bronze medal matches
Boldsaikhan Khongorzul (MGL) | 0
Helen Maroulis (USA) | 11
Valeria Koblova (ROC) | 0
Evelina Nikolova (BUL) | 5^{F}

== Final standing ==
| Rank | Athlete |
|---|---|
| 1st place, gold medalist(s) | Risako Kawai (JPN) |
| 2nd place, silver medalist(s) | Iryna Kurachkina (BLR) |
| 3rd place, bronze medalist(s) | Helen Maroulis (USA) |
| 3rd place, bronze medalist(s) | Evelina Nikolova (BUL) |
| 5 | Boldsaikhan Khongorzul (MGL) |
| 5 | Valeria Koblova (ROC) |
| 7 | Anastasia Nichita (MDA) |
| 8 | Tetyana Kit (UKR) |
| 9 | Anshu Malik (IND) |
| 10 | Rong Ningning (CHN) |
| 11 | Alma Valencia (MEX) |
| 12 | Fatoumata Camara (GUI) |
| 13 | Odunayo Adekuoroye (NGR) |
| 14 | Mathilde Rivière (FRA) |
| 15 | Siwar Bousetta (TUN) |
| 16 | Jowita Wrzesień (POL) |
