= Veronika Chumikova =

Russian freestyle wrestler

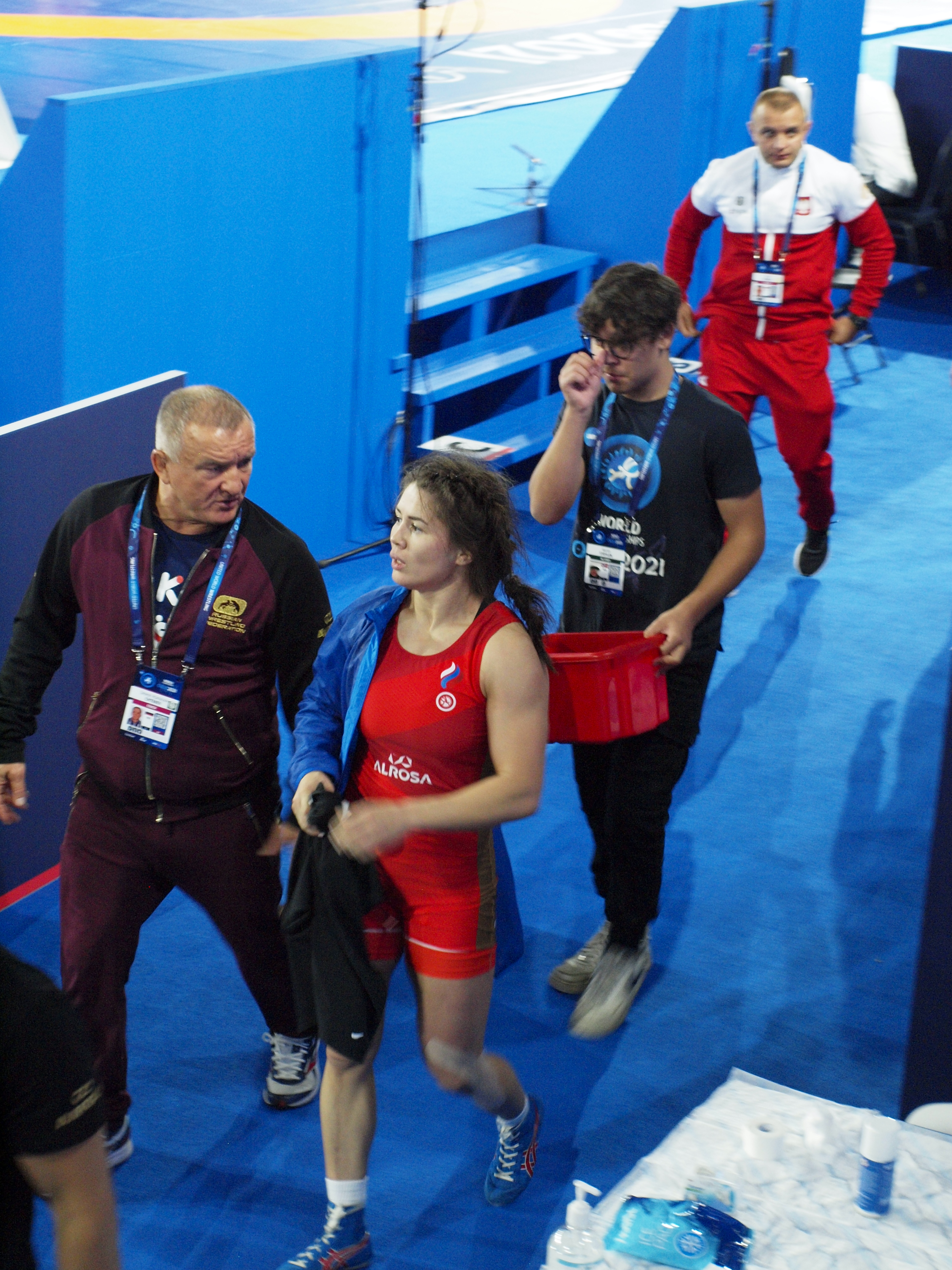
- Chumikova at the 2021 World Wrestling Championships in Oslo, Norway

Personal information
- Native name: Вероника Геннадьевна Чумикова
- Full name: Veronika Gennadievna Chumikova
- Nationality: Russian (Russia)
- Born: 4 July 1994 (age 32) Shikhazan village, Kanashsky District, Chuvashia, Russia
- Weight: 57 kg (126 lb); 59 kg (130 lb)

Sport
- Country: Russia
- Sport: Amateur wrestling
- Event: Freestyle
- Coached by: Olga Smirnova, Nikolay Belov, Vladimir Bogolubov
Medal record
Women's freestyle wrestling
Representing Russia
European Championships
Silver medal – second place	2021 Warsaw	59 kg
Individual World Cup
Bronze medal – third place	2020 Belgrade	57 kg
Golden Grand Prix Ivan Yarygin
Gold medal – first place	2020 Krasnoyarsk	57 kg
Silver medal – second place	2017 Krasnoyarsk	58 kg
Bronze medal – third place	2014 Krasnoyarsk	55 kg
Bronze medal – third place	2018 Krasnoyarsk	59 kg
Bronze medal – third place	2022 Krasnoyarsk	57 kg
Yasar Dogu Tournament
Bronze medal – third place	2022 Istanbul	57 kg
European U23 Championships
Bronze medal – third place	2016 Ruse	58 kg
Representing Chuvashia
Golden Grand Prix Ivan Yarygin
Gold medal – first place	2024 Krasnoyarsk	57 kg

Veronika Gennadievna Chumikova (Russian: Верони́ка Генна́дьевна Чу́микова, born 4 July 1994) is a Russian freestyle wrestler of Chuvash heritage. She is a silver medalist at the European Wrestling Championships. She also won a medal at the Golden Grand Prix Ivan Yarygin held in Krasnoyarsk, Russia on six occasions (in 2014, 2017, 2018, 2020, 2022 and 2024).

== Career ==
Chumikova won the gold medal in the women's 58 kg event at the 2016 World University Wrestling Championships held in Çorum, Turkey. In 2018, she competed at the Klippan Lady Open in Klippan, Sweden without winning a medal. Later that year, Chumikova won the gold medal in the women's 59 kg event at the 2018 Russian National Women's Freestyle Wrestling Championships held in Smolensk, Russia.

In 2020, Chumikova won one of the bronze medals in the women's 57 kg event at the Individual Wrestling World Cup held in Belgrade, Serbia. In March 2021, she competed at the European Qualification Tournament in Budapest, Hungary hoping to earn a place for a competitor at the 2020 Summer Olympics in Tokyo, Japan. She lost her first match against Evelina Nikolova of Bulgaria which meant that she could no longer earn a spot for the Olympics in this tournament. A month later, she won the silver medal in the women's 59 kg event at the 2021 European Wrestling Championships held in Warsaw, Poland. In May 2021, Chumikova earned an Olympic spot in the women's 57 kg event for the ROC at the World Olympic Qualification Tournament. Valeria Koblova competed in the women's 57 kg event at the 2020 Summer Olympics.

In October 2021, Chumikova lost her bronze medal match in the women's 57 kg event at the World Wrestling Championships in Oslo, Norway. In January 2022, she won one of the bronze medals in the women's 57 kg event at the Golden Grand Prix Ivan Yarygin held in Krasnoyarsk, Russia. In February 2022, she also won one of the bronze medals in the 57 kg event at the Yasar Dogu Tournament held in Istanbul, Turkey.

== Achievements ==
Year	Tournament	Location	Result	Event
2021	European Championships	Warsaw, Poland	2nd	Freestyle 59 kg
