= Anastasia Nichita =

Moldovan freestyle wrestler (born 1999)

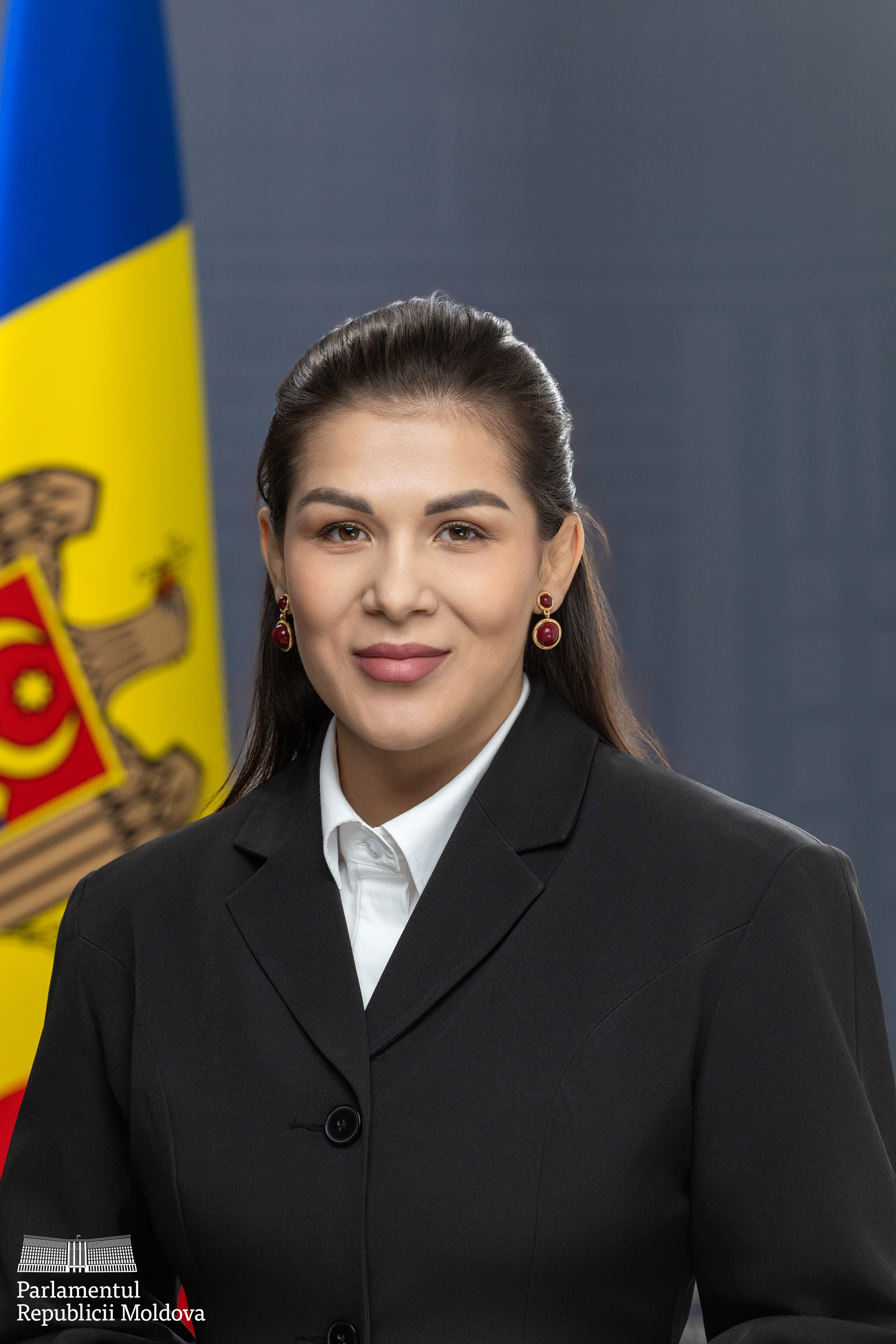
- Official portrait, 2025

Personal information
- Born: 19 February 1999 (age 27) Tătărești, Moldova
- Height: 165 cm (5 ft 5 in)

Sport
- Country: Moldova
- Sport: Amateur wrestling
- Weight class: 57 kg; 59 kg
- Event: Freestyle
Medal record
Women's freestyle wrestling
Representing Moldova
Olympic Games
| Silver medal – second place | 2024 Paris | 57 kg |
World Championships
| Gold medal – first place | 2022 Belgrade | 59 kg |
| Silver medal – second place | 2023 Belgrade | 57 kg |
European Championships
| Gold medal – first place | 2020 Rome | 59 kg |
| Gold medal – first place | 2022 Budapest | 59 kg |
| Gold medal – first place | 2023 Zagreb | 59 kg |
| Bronze medal – third place | 2019 Bucharest | 57 kg |
| Bronze medal – third place | 2021 Warsaw | 59 kg |
Individual World Cup
| Gold medal – first place | 2020 Belgrade | 57 kg |
European Games
| Bronze medal – third place | 2019 Minsk | 57 kg |
Yasar Dogu Tournament
| Gold medal – first place | 2022 Istanbul | 59 kg |
World U23 Championships
| Silver medal – second place | 2019 Budapest | 59 kg |
European U23 Championship
| Gold medal – first place | 2019 Novi Sad | 59 kg |
| Gold medal – first place | 2021 Skopje | 59 kg |
| Gold medal – first place | 2022 Plovdiv | 59 kg |
| Silver medal – second place | 2017 Szombathely | 60 kg |
| Silver medal – second place | 2018 Istanbul | 59 kg |
Junior World Championships
| Gold medal – first place | 2018 Trnava | 59 kg |
| Silver medal – second place | 2017 Tampere | 59 kg |
| Silver medal – second place | 2019 Tallinn | 59 kg |
- Political career

Member of the Moldovan Parliament
- In office 22 October 2025 – 5 February 2026
- Succeeded by: Tatiana Rotari
- Parliamentary group: Party of Action and Solidarity

Anastasia Nichita (born 19 February 1999) is a Moldovan freestyle wrestler. She won the silver medal in the women's 57 kg event at the 2024 Summer Olympics in Paris, France. She won the gold medal in the 59 kg event at the 2022 World Wrestling Championships held in Belgrade, Serbia. She is a three-time gold medalist in the 59 kg event at the European Wrestling Championships.

Nichita also represented Moldova at the 2020 Summer Olympics in Tokyo, Japan.

== Career ==
At the 2018 European U23 Wrestling Championship in Istanbul, Turkey, Nichita won the silver medal in the women's 59 kg event. At the 2019 World U23 Wrestling Championship in Budapest, Hungary, she also won the silver medal in the women's 59 kg event. In the final, she lost against Yumeka Tanabe of Japan.

In 2019, at the European Wrestling Championships held in Bucharest, Romania, Nichita won one of the bronze medals in the women's 57 kg event. In that same year, she also won a bronze medal in the women's 57 kg event at the 2019 European Games held in Minsk, Belarus. In her bronze medal match she defeated Grace Bullen of Norway. In 2020, Nichita won the gold medal in the women's 59 kg event at the European Wrestling Championships held in Rome, Italy. She defeated Bilyana Dudova of Bulgaria in the final. Nichita also won the gold medal in the women's 57 kg event at the Individual Wrestling World Cup held in Belgrade, Serbia.

In 2021, Nichita won one of the bronze medals in the 59 kg event at the European Wrestling Championships held in Warsaw, Poland. She won the gold medal in her event at the 2021 European U23 Wrestling Championship held in Skopje, North Macedonia.

Nichita represented Moldova at the 2020 Summer Olympics in Tokyo, Japan. She competed in the women's 57 kg event where she won her first match against Odunayo Adekuoroye of Nigeria and she was then eliminated in her next match by eventual bronze medalist Evelina Nikolova of Bulgaria. At the 2021 U23 World Wrestling Championships held in Belgrade, Serbia, she competed in the women's 59 kg event.

In February 2022, Nichita won the gold medal in the women's 59 kg event at the Yasar Dogu Tournament held in Istanbul, Turkey. In March 2022, she won the gold medal in the women's 59 kg event at the European U23 Wrestling Championship held in Plovdiv, Bulgaria. In that same month, Nichita also won the gold medal in the 59 kg event at the European Wrestling Championships held in Budapest, Hungary. In the final, she defeated Jowita Wrzesień of Poland.

Nichita won the gold medal in the 59 kg event at the 2022 World Wrestling Championships held in Belgrade, Serbia. She defeated Grace Bullen of Norway in her gold medal match.

Nichita won the gold medal in the women's 59 kg event at the 2023 Grand Prix Zagreb Open held in Zagreb, Croatia. She won the silver medal in her event at the 2023 Ibrahim Moustafa Tournament held in Alexandria, Egypt. Nichita won the gold medal in the women's 59 kg event at the 2023 European Wrestling Championships held in Zagreb, Croatia. She defeated Yuliya Tkach of Ukraine in her gold medal match by walkover.

Nichita won the silver medal in the 57 kg event at the 2023 World Wrestling Championships held in Belgrade, Serbia. As a result, she earned a quota place for Moldova for the 2024 Summer Olympics in Paris, France. In February 2024, she competed in the women's 59 kg event at the European Wrestling Championships held in Bucharest, Romania. In August 2024, Nichita won the silver medal in the women's 57 kg event at the Olympics. In the final, she lost against Tsugumi Sakurai of Japan.

== Achievements ==
| Year | Tournament | Location | Result | Event |
|---|---|---|---|---|
| 2019 | European Championships | Bucharest, Romania | 3rd | Freestyle 57 kg |
| 2019 | European Games | Minsk, Belarus | 3rd | Freestyle 57 kg |
| 2020 | European Championships | Rome, Italy | 1st | Freestyle 59 kg |
| 2021 | European Championships | Warsaw, Poland | 3rd | Freestyle 59 kg |
| 2022 | European Championships | Budapest, Hungary | 1st | Freestyle 59 kg |
| 2022 | World Championships | Belgrade, Serbia | 1st | Freestyle 59 kg |
| 2023 | European Championships | Zagreb, Croatia | 1st | Freestyle 59 kg |
| 2023 | World Championships | Belgrade, Serbia | 2nd | Freestyle 57 kg |
| 2024 | Summer Olympics | Paris, France | 2nd | Freestyle 57 kg |
