= Emese Barka =

Hungarian freestyle wrestler

- Emese Barka (in red) vs Leigh Jaynes

Personal information
- Nationality: Hungarian
- Born: 4 November 1989 (age 36) Budapest, Hungary
- Height: 167 cm (5 ft 6 in)
- Weight: 58 kg (128 lb)

Sport
- Sport: Sport wrestling
- Event: Freestyle
- Club: Csepel BC
Medal record
Representing Hungary
Women's Freestyle Wrestling
World Championships
Bronze medal – third place	2013 Budapest	55 kg
Bronze medal – third place	2016 Budapest	60 kg
Bronze medal – third place	2018 Budapest	57 kg
European Wrestling Championships
Bronze medal – third place	2007 Sofia	51 kg
Bronze medal – third place	2013 Tbilisi	55 kg
Bronze medal – third place	2017 Novi Sad	58 kg
Bronze medal – third place	2018 Kaspiysk	57 kg
Gold medal – first place	2019 Bucharest	57 kg
European Games
Gold medal – first place	2015 Baku	58 kg

Emese Barka (born 4 November 1989 in Budapest) is a Hungarian freestyle wrestler. She won the bronze medal in the 55 kg division at the 2013 World Wrestling Championships. She won a gold medal in the 58 kg at the 2015 European Games.

In March 2021, she competed at the European Qualification Tournament in Budapest, Hungary hoping to qualify for the 2020 Summer Olympics in Tokyo, Japan.
