= Alyona Kolesnik =

Azerbaijani freestyle wrestler

Alyona Kolesnik Алёна Колесник
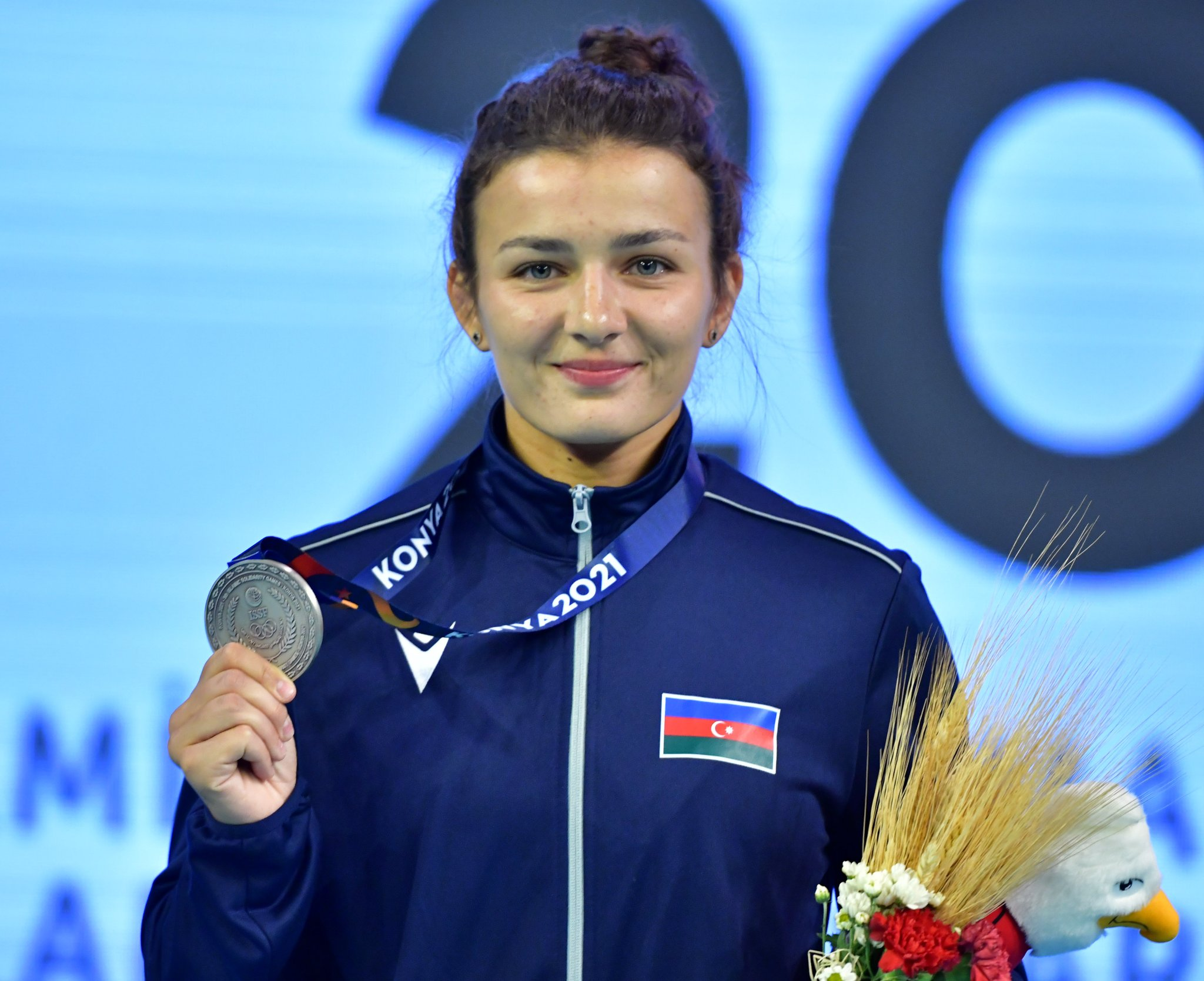
- Kolesnik in 2022

Personal information
- Nationality: Ukrainian; Azerbaijani
- Born: 29 January 1995 (age 31) Kryvyi Rih, Ukraine
- Home town: Kyiv, Ukraine
- Height: 160 cm (5 ft 3 in)
- Weight: 57 kg (126 lb)

Sport
- Country: Azerbaijan
- Sport: Amateur wrestling
- Weight class: 57 kg; 59 kg
- Event: Freestyle
Medal record
Women's freestyle wrestling
Representing Azerbaijan
European Championships
Gold medal – first place	2024 Bucharest	59 kg
Bronze medal – third place	2017 Novi Sad	55 kg
Bronze medal – third place	2018 Kaspiysk	57 kg
Bronze medal – third place	2019 Bucharest	57 kg
European Games
Bronze medal – third place	2019 Minsk	57 kg
Islamic Solidarity Games
Silver medal – second place	2017 Baku	58 kg
Silver medal – second place	2021 Konya	59 kg
Golden Grand Prix Ivan Yarygin
Gold medal – first place	2022 Krasnoyarsk	59 kg
Yasar Dogu Tournament
Bronze medal – third place	2018 Istanbul	57 kg
Bronze medal – third place	2022 Istanbul	59 kg

Alyona Kolesnik (born 29 January 1995) is a Ukrainian-Azerbaijani freestyle wrestler. She is a four-time medalist, including gold, at the European Wrestling Championships. She is also a two-time silver medalist at the Islamic Solidarity Games. She won bronze in her event at the 2019 European Games.

== Career ==
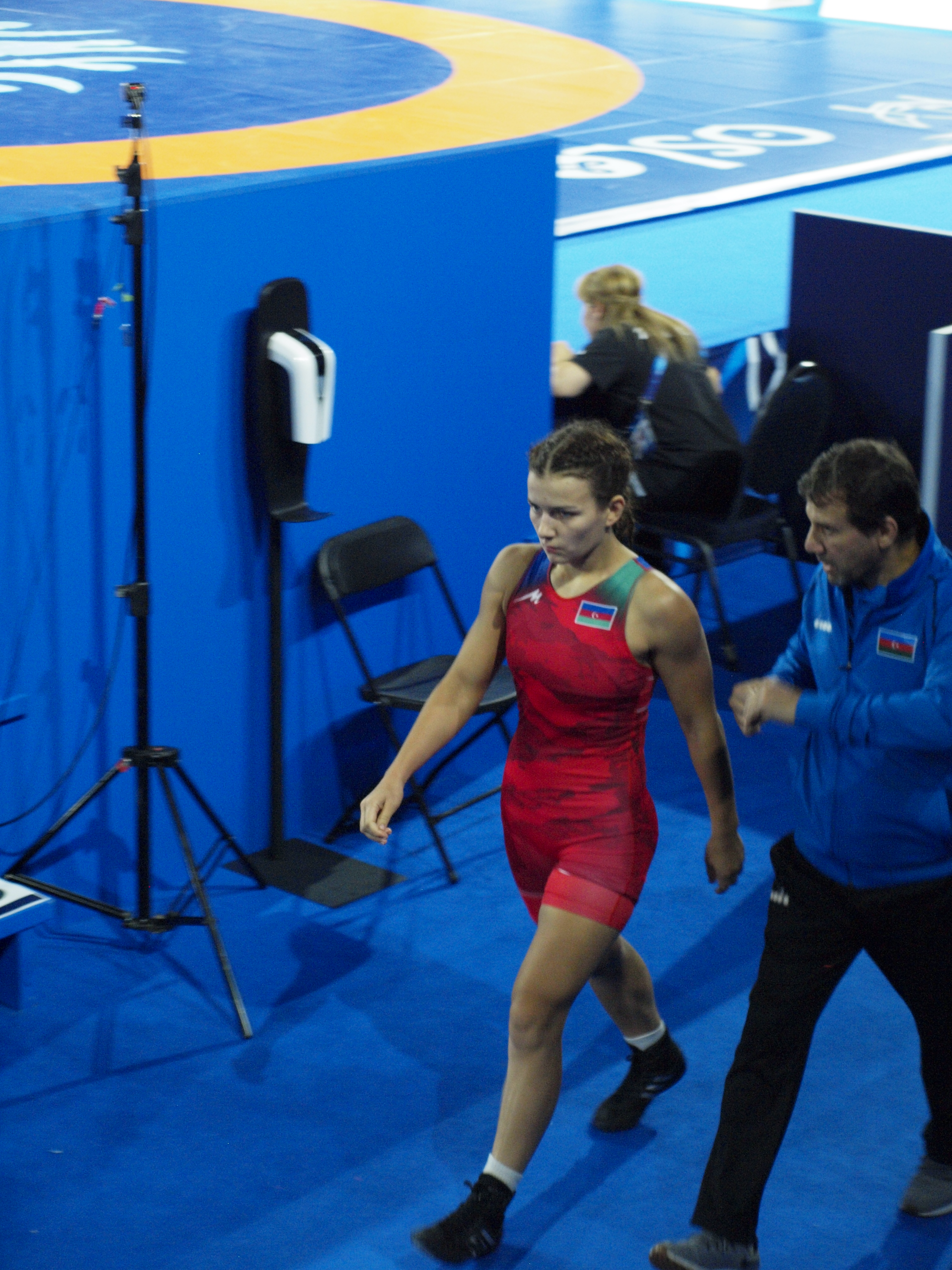
Alyona Kolesnik at the 2021 World Wrestling Championships in Oslo, Norway.

At the 2017 European Wrestling Championships held in Novi Sad, Serbia, Kolesnik won one of the bronze medals in the women's 55 kg event. In 2018, she also won one of the bronze medals in the women's 57 kg and she repeated this in 2019 with another bronze medal in the same event.

At the 2017 Islamic Solidarity Games held in Baku, Azerbaijan, Kolesnik won the silver medal in the women's 58 kg event. In the final, she lost against Aisuluu Tynybekova of Kyrgyzstan.

Kolesnik won one of the bronze medals in the women's 57 kg event at the 2019 European Games held in Minsk, Belarus. In her bronze medal match she defeated Bediha Gün of Turkey. In 2020, at the European Wrestling Championships held in Rome, Italy, she competed in the women's 57 kg event. She lost her bronze medal match against Iryna Kurachkina of Belarus. In 2020, Kolesnik competed in the women's 57 kg event at the Individual Wrestling World Cup held in Belgrade, Serbia where she lost her bronze medal match against Veronika Chumikova of Russia.

In March 2021, Kolesnik competed at the European Qualification Tournament in Budapest, Hungary hoping to qualify for the 2020 Summer Olympics in Tokyo, Japan. She lost her first match against Evelina Nikolova of Bulgaria and she was then eliminated in her next match in the repechage. She also failed to qualify for the Olympics at the World Olympic Qualification Tournament held in Sofia, Bulgaria.

In October 2021, Kolesnik was eliminated in her first match in the women's 59 kg event at the World Wrestling Championships held in Oslo, Norway. In January 2022, she won the gold medal in the women's 59 kg event at the Golden Grand Prix Ivan Yarygin held in Krasnoyarsk, Russia. In February 2022, Kolesnik won one of the bronze medals in the women's 59 kg event at the Yasar Dogu Tournament held in Istanbul, Turkey. She lost her bronze medal match in the 59 kg event at the 2022 European Wrestling Championships held in Budapest, Hungary.

Kolesnik won the silver medal in the 59 kg event at the 2021 Islamic Solidarity Games held in Konya, Turkey. She competed in the 59 kg event at the 2022 World Wrestling Championships held in Belgrade, Serbia.

Kolesnik won the bronze medal in the women's 59 kg event at the 2023 Grand Prix Zagreb Open held in Zagreb, Croatia. She won the gold medal in the women's 59 kg event at the 2024 European Wrestling Championships held in Bucharest, Romania. In the final, she defeated Alina Filipovych of Ukraine.

== Achievements ==
Year	Tournament	Location	Result	Event
2017	European Championships	Novi Sad, Serbia	3rd	Freestyle 55 kg
2017	Islamic Solidarity Games	Baku, Azerbaijan	2nd	Freestyle 58 kg
2018	European Championships	Kaspiysk, Russia	3rd	Freestyle 57 kg
2019	European Championships	Bucharest, Romania	3rd	Freestyle 57 kg
2019	European Games	Minsk, Belarus	3rd	Freestyle 57 kg
2022	Islamic Solidarity Games	Konya, Turkey	2nd	Freestyle 59 kg
2024	European Championships	Bucharest, Romania	1st	Freestyle 59 kg
