= Mathilde Rivière =

French freestyle wrestler

Personal information
- Full name: Mathilde Helène Rivière
- Born: 18 December 1989 (age 36) Dreux, France
- Height: 1.67 m (5 ft 6 in)

Sport
- Country: France
- Sport: Amateur wrestling
- Weight class: 55–57 kg (121–126 lb)
- Event: Freestyle
Medal record
Women's freestyle wrestling
Representing France
European Championships
Bronze medal – third place	2017 Novi Sad	55 kg

Mathilde Helène Rivière (born 18 December 1989) is a French freestyle wrestler. She is a bronze medalist at the European Wrestling Championships. Rivière represented France at the 2020 Summer Olympics in Tokyo, Japan. She also represented France at the European Games in 2015 and in 2019.

== Career ==
At the 2017 European Wrestling Championships held in Novi Sad, Serbia, Rivière won one of the bronze medals in the women's 55 kg event.

In 2019, Rivière competed in the 57 kg event at the European Games held in Minsk, Belarus where she lost her first match against Iryna Chykhradze of Ukraine. In May 2021, she qualified at the World Olympic Qualification Tournament to compete at the 2020 Summer Olympics in Tokyo, Japan. She competed in the women's 57 kg event.

Rivière competed at the 2024 European Wrestling Olympic Qualification Tournament in Baku, Azerbaijan hoping to qualify for the 2024 Summer Olympics in Paris, France. She was eliminated in her first match and she did not qualify for the Olympics. Rivière also competed at the 2024 World Wrestling Olympic Qualification Tournament held in Istanbul, Turkey without qualifying for the Olympics.

== Achievements ==
Year	Tournament	Location	Result	Event
2017	European Championships	Novi Sad, Serbia	3rd	Freestyle 55 kg
