= Elena Brugger =

German freestyle wrestler

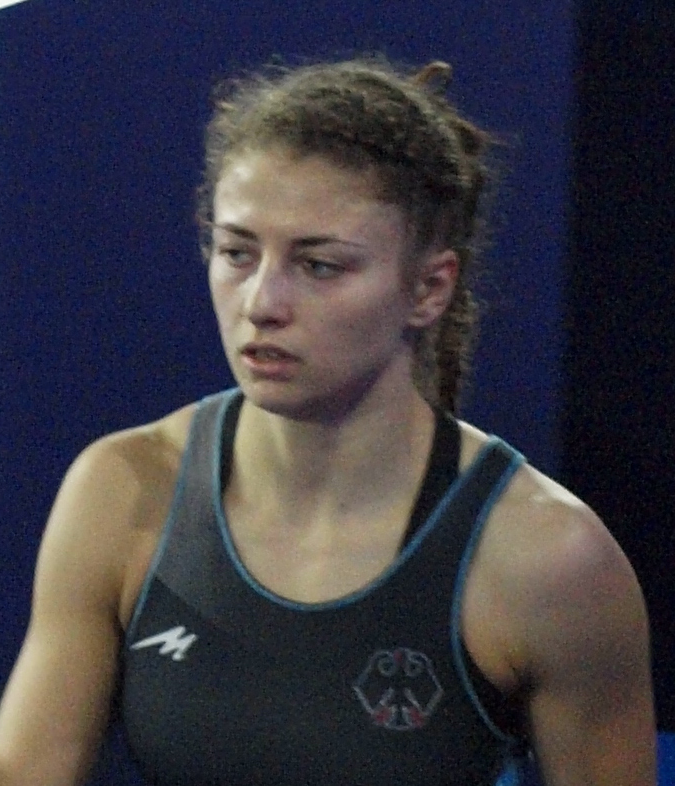

Personal information
- Full name: Elena Heike Brugger
- Born: 21 August 1997 (age 28) Germany
- Height: 1.66 m (5 ft 5 in)
- Weight: 57 kg (126 lb; 9.0 st)

Sport
- Country: Germany
- Sport: Women's freestyle wrestling
- Event: 57 kg
Medal record
Women's freestyle wrestling
Representing Germany
World Championships
Bronze medal – third place	2024 Tirana	59 kg
European Championships
Bronze medal – third place	2022 Budapest	59 kg
Bronze medal – third place	2023 Zagreb	57 kg
World Military Championships
Gold medal – first place	2025 Warendorf	62 kg
World University Championships
Gold medal – first place	2018 Goiana	55 kg
Yasar Dogu Tournament
Silver medal – second place	2021 Istanbul	57 kg
Grand Prix
Gold medal – first place	2015 Wolfurt	53 kg
Gold medal – first place	2023 Nice	57 kg
Gold medal – first place	2024 Warsaw	59 kg
Silver medal – second place	2017 Dormagen	57 kg
Silver medal – second place	2022 Bucharest	59 kg
Silver medal – second place	2022 Tunis	59 kg
Silver medal – second place	2025 Budapest	59 kg
Bronze medal – third place	2019 Dormagen	57 kg
Bronze medal – third place	2025 Warsaw	59 kg
Bronze medal – third place	2026 Zagreb	59 kg
World U23 Championships
Bronze medal – third place	2018 Bucharest	55 kg
European U23 Championships
Silver medal – second place	2018 Istanbul	55 kg
World Juniors Championships
Bronze medal – third place	2016 Macon	63 kg
European Juniors Championships
Gold medal – first place	2016 Bucharest	51 kg
Bronze medal – third place	2017 Dortmund	55 kg

Elena Brugger is a German freestyle wrestler competing in the 57 kg division. She is a two-time bronze medalist at the European Wrestling Championships.

== Career ==
She won a bronze medal at the 2022 European Wrestling Championships in Budapest, Hungary, by defeating Alyona Kolesnik, competing for Azerbaijan, 9–0 in the third place match in the women's freestyle 59 kg.

In 2023, she won a bronze medal in the women's freestyle 57 kg event at the 2023 European Wrestling Championships held in Zagreb, Croatia.

== Achievements ==
Year	Tournament	Location	Result	Event
2022	European Championships	Budapest, Hungary	3rd	Freestyle 57 kg
2023	European Championships	Zagreb, Croatia	3rd	Freestyle 57 kg
