= Jowita Wrzesień =

Polish freestyle wrestler (born 1993)

Personal information
- Born: 8 December 1993 (age 32) Będzin, Poland

Sport
- Country: Poland
- Sport: Amateur wrestling
- Weight class: 57 kg; 59 kg
- Event: Freestyle
Medal record
Women's freestyle wrestling
Representing Poland
World Championships
Bronze medal – third place	2022 Belgrade	59 kg
European Championships
Silver medal – second place	2022 Budapest	59 kg

Jowita Wrzesień (born 8 December 1993) is a Polish freestyle wrestler. She won one of the bronze medals in the women's 59 kg event at the 2022 World Wrestling Championships held in Belgrade, Serbia. She won the silver medal in the women's 59 kg event at the 2022 European Wrestling Championships held in Budapest, Hungary.

== Career ==
At the 2019 World Wrestling Championships held in Nur-Sultan, Kazakhstan, she lost her bronze medal match against Iryna Kurachkina of Belarus in the women's freestyle 57 kg event.

In March 2021, Wrzesień competed at the European Qualification Tournament in Budapest, Hungary and qualified for the 2020 Summer Olympics in Tokyo, Japan. Three months later, she won one of the bronze medals in her event at the 2021 Poland Open held in Warsaw, Poland.

Wrzesień represented Poland at the 2020 Summer Olympics in Tokyo, Japan. She competed in the women's 57 kg event where she was eliminated in her first match by Evelina Nikolova of Bulgaria. Two months later, she was eliminated in her first match in the women's 59 kg event at the 2021 World Wrestling Championships held in Oslo, Norway.

In February 2022, Wrzesień won one of the bronze medals in the women's 59 kg event at the Yasar Dogu Tournament held in Istanbul, Turkey. In March 2022, she won the silver medal in the 59 kg event at the European Wrestling Championships held in Budapest, Hungary. In the final, she lost against Anastasia Nichita of Moldova. A few months later, she won the silver medal in her event at the Matteo Pellicone Ranking Series 2022 held in Rome, Italy. She won one of the bronze medals in the women's 59 kg event at the 2022 World Wrestling Championships held in Belgrade, Serbia.

Wrzesień competed at the 2024 European Wrestling Olympic Qualification Tournament in Baku, Azerbaijan hoping to qualify for the 2024 Summer Olympics in Paris, France. She was eliminated in her first match and she did not qualify for the Olympics.

== Achievements ==
Year	Tournament	Location	Result	Event
2022	European Championships	Budapest, Hungary	2nd	Freestyle 59 kg
2022	World Championships	Belgrade, Serbia	3rd	Freestyle 59 kg
