= 2025 World Wrestling Championships – Women's freestyle 57 kg =

Wrestling competitions

Women's freestyle 57 kg at the 2025 World Championships
- Venue: Arena Zagreb
- Dates: 16–17 September 2025
- Competitors: 22 from 20 nations

Medalists
gold medal	Helen Maroulis	United States
silver medal	Son Il-sim	North Korea
bronze medal	Olga Khoroshavtseva
bronze medal	Hong Kexin	China

The women's freestyle 57 kilograms is a competition featured at the 2025 World Wrestling Championships, and was held in Zagreb, Croatia on 16 and 17 September 2025.

This freestyle wrestling competition consists of a single-elimination tournament, with a repechage used to determine the winner of two bronze medals. The two finalists face off for gold and silver medals. Each wrestler who loses to one of the two finalists moves into the repechage, culminating in a pair of bronze medal matches, featuring the semifinal losers each facing the remaining repechage opponent from their half of the bracket.

== Results ==
Legend

- F — Won by fall
- WO — Won by walkover

=== Final ===
Final
Helen Maroulis (USA)	3
Son Il-sim (PRK)	2

=== Top half ===
Round of 32
Samantha Stewart (CAN)	0
Himeka Tokuhara (JPN)	5
Laura Almaganbetova (KAZ)	0
Jenna Hemiä (FIN)	4^{F}
Bertha Rojas (MEX)	4
Tapasya Gahlawat (IND)	2

Round of 16
Helen Maroulis (USA)	5^{F}
Emine Çakmak (TUR)	0
Himeka Tokuhara (JPN)	13
Zhala Aliyeva (AZE)	2
Tamara Dollák (HUN)	11
Jenna Hemiä (FIN)	1
Bertha Rojas (MEX)	0
Olga Khoroshavtseva (UWW)	10

Quarterfinals
Helen Maroulis (USA)	5^{F}
Himeka Tokuhara (JPN)	0
Tamara Dollák (HUN)	5
Olga Khoroshavtseva (UWW)	6

Semifinals
Helen Maroulis (USA)	5^{F}
Olga Khoroshavtseva (UWW)	0

=== Bottom half ===
Round of 32
Son Il-sim (PRK)	WO
~~Nethmi Ahinsa (SRI)~~
Iryna Kurachkina (UWW)	10
Magdalena Głodek (POL)	2
Liao Pei-ying (TPE)	0
Evelina Hulthén (SWE)	3

Round of 16
Luisa Valverde (ECU)	0
Son Il-sim (PRK)	9^{F}
Iryna Kurachkina (UWW)	5
Khürelkhüügiin Bolortuyaa (MGL)	4
Kwon Young-jin (KOR)	7
Evelina Hulthén (SWE)	14
Solomiia Vynnyk (UKR)	6
Hong Kexin (CHN)	17

Quarterfinals
Son Il-sim (PRK)	12
Iryna Kurachkina (UWW)	0
Evelina Hulthén (SWE)	2
Hong Kexin (CHN)	13

Semifinals
Son Il-sim (PRK)	12
Hong Kexin (CHN)	2

=== Repechage ===
Repechage round 1
~~Nethmi Ahinsa (SRI)~~
Luisa Valverde (ECU)	WO

Repechage round 2
Emine Çakmak (TUR)	2
Himeka Tokuhara (JPN)	8^{F}
Luisa Valverde (ECU)	0
Iryna Kurachkina (UWW)	10

Bronze medals
Himeka Tokuhara (JPN)	1
Olga Khoroshavtseva (UWW)	4
Iryna Kurachkina (UWW)	0
Hong Kexin (CHN)	10

== Final standing ==
Rank	Athlete
1st place, gold medalist(s)	Helen Maroulis (USA)
2nd place, silver medalist(s)	Son Il-sim (PRK)
3rd place, bronze medalist(s)	Olga Khoroshavtseva (UWW)
3rd place, bronze medalist(s)	Hong Kexin (CHN)
5	Himeka Tokuhara (JPN)
5	Iryna Kurachkina (UWW)
7	Evelina Hulthén (SWE)
8	Jenna Hemiä (FIN)
9	Tamara Dollák (HUN)
10	Luisa Valverde (ECU)
11	Bertha Rojas (MEX)
12	Kwon Young-jin (KOR)
13	Solomiia Vynnyk (UKR)
14	Khürelkhüügiin Bolortuyaa (MGL)
15	Tapasya Gahlawat (IND)
16	Magdalena Głodek (POL)
17	Zhala Aliyeva (AZE)
18	Emine Çakmak (TUR)
19	Liao Pei-ying (TPE)
20	Laura Almaganbetova (KAZ)
21	Samantha Stewart (CAN)
—	Nethmi Ahinsa (SRI)
