= 2026 European Wrestling Championships – Women's freestyle 57 kg =

Wrestling competition held in Tirana, Albania

Women's freestyle 57 kg at the 2026 European Wrestling Championships
- Venue: Tirana Olympic Park
- Location: Tirana, Albania
- Dates: 23–24 April
- Competitors: 14 from 12 nations

Medalists
| gold medal | Magdalena Głodek | Poland |
| silver medal | Elvira Süleyman Kamaloğlu | Turkey |
| bronze medal | Solomiia Vynnyk | Ukraine |
| bronze medal | Zhala Aliyeva | Azerbaijan |

The women's freestyle 57 kilograms competition at the 2026 European Wrestling Championships was held from 23 to 24 April 2026 at the Tirana Olympic Park in Tirana, Albania.

== Results ==
Legend

- F — Won by fall

=== Main bracket ===
Round of 16
Lydia Pérez (ESP) | 6
Olga Popova (BUL) | 9
Magdalena Głodek (POL) | 2^{F}
Felicitas Domajeva (NOR) | 0
Iulia Leorda (MDA) | 0
Solomiia Vynnyk (UKR) | 7
Tamara Dollák (HUN) | 0
Elvira Süleyman Kamaloğlu (TUR) | 10
Aleksandra Skirenko (UWW) | 8
Aryna Martynava (UWW) | 11
Zhala Aliyeva (AZE) | 4^{F}
Amory Andrich (GER) | 0

Quarterfinals
Evelina Hulthén (SWE) | 10
Olga Popova (BUL) | 4
Magdalena Głodek (POL) | 6^{F}
Solomiia Vynnyk (UKR) | 0
Elvira Süleyman Kamaloğlu (TUR) | 9
Aryna Martynava (UWW) | 5
Zhala Aliyeva (AZE) | 6^{F}
Jenna Hemiä (FIN) | 0

Semifinals
Evelina Hulthén (SWE) | 3
Magdalena Głodek (POL) | 3
Elvira Süleyman Kamaloğlu (TUR) | 6
Zhala Aliyeva (AZE) | 2

Final
Magdalena Głodek (POL) | 5
Elvira Süleyman Kamaloğlu (TUR) | 1

=== Repechage ===
Repechage round 1
Felicitas Domajeva (NOR) | 0
Solomiia Vynnyk (UKR) | 12
Tamara Dollák (HUN) | 0
Aryna Martynava (UWW) | 10

Bronze medal matches
Solomiia Vynnyk (UKR) | 4^{F}
Evelina Hulthén (SWE) | 0
Aryna Martynava (UWW) | 4
Zhala Aliyeva (AZE) | 6^{F}

== Final standing ==
| Rank | Wrestler |
|---|---|
| 1st place, gold medalist(s) | Magdalena Głodek (POL) |
| 2nd place, silver medalist(s) | Elvira Süleyman Kamaloğlu (TUR) |
| 3rd place, bronze medalist(s) | Solomiia Vynnyk (UKR) |
| 3rd place, bronze medalist(s) | Zhala Aliyeva (AZE) |
| 5 | Evelina Hulthén (SWE) |
| 5 | Aryna Martynava (UWW) |
| 7 | Olga Popova (BUL) |
| 8 | Aleksandra Skirenko (UWW) |
| 9 | Lydia Pérez (ESP) |
| 10 | Felicitas Domajeva (NOR) |
| 11 | Amory Andrich (GER) |
| 12 | Jenna Hemiä (FIN) |
| 13 | Iulia Leorda (MDA) |
| 14 | Tamara Dollák (HUN) |
