= Zawonie =

Former village now in Lviv Oblast, Ukraine

- Village
- Location within Lviv Oblast Location within Ukraine
- Coordinates: 50°16′53″N 24°18′50″E
- Country: Ukraine
- Oblast: Lviv Oblast
- District: Chervonohrad Raion

Zawonie is a former village, currently on the terrain of Ukraine, in Chervonohrad Raion of Lviv Oblast. In Ukrainian it was known as Завонє (transliterated: Zavonye). The village was situated on the edge of the forest east of Sosnivka and south-west of the Western Bug River.

Zawonie as an independent gmina (municipality) was created on 23 April 1930 in the Second Polish Republic. Before that it was a part of the gmina of Sielec Bełzki. Since 1934 the village belonged to the gmina of Parchacz in the powiat of Sokal in the Lwów Voivodeship. As a result of the Soviet invasion of Poland as part of the Second World War in September 1939, the eastern border of Poland was moved westward to the Bug and Solokiya Rivers, resulting in the village as well as the rest of the gnima of Parchacz now being located in the USSR. In 1941 the Germans took control of the area as part of their invasion of the Soviet Union.

The village ceased to exist on 6 March 1944 as a result of being burned to the ground during pacification actions in German-occupied Poland by Germans and Ukrainians.
