= 2024 European Wrestling Championships – Women's freestyle 57 kg =

Wrestling competition

Women's freestyle 57 kg at the 2024 European Wrestling Championships
- Venue: Polyvalent Hall
- Location: Bucharest, Romania
- Dates: 15-16 February
- Competitors: 15

Medalists
gold medal	Iryna Kurachkina	Individual Neutral Athletes
silver medal	Evelina Nikolova	Bulgaria
bronze medal	Anhelina Lysak	Poland
bronze medal	Solomiia Vynnyk	Ukraine

The women's freestyle 57 kg is a competition featured at the 2024 European Wrestling Championships, and held in Bucharest, Romania on February 15 and 16.

== Results ==
Legend

- F — Won by fall

=== Main bracket ===
Round of 16
Irina Ologonova (AIN)	6
Evelina Hulthén (SWE)	0
Aurora Russo (ITA)	5
Anna Michalcová (CZE)	1
Mihaela Samoil (MDA)	0
Iryna Kurachkina (AIN)	10
Zhala Aliyeva (AZE)	9
Erika Bognár (HUN)	2
Solomiia Vynnyk (UKR)	12
Graciela Sánchez (ESP)	1
Evelina Nikolova (BUL)	3
Mathilde Rivière (FRA)	0
Ana Maria Puiu (ROU)	0
Elvira Kamaloğlu (TUR)	10

Quarterfinals
Anhelina Lysak (POL)	4^{F}
Irina Ologonova (AIN)	0
Aurora Russo (ITA)	0
Iryna Kurachkina (AIN)	12^{F}
Zhala Aliyeva (AZE)	5
Solomiia Vynnyk (UKR)	12
Evelina Nikolova (BUL)	10
Elvira Kamaloğlu (TUR)	6

Semifinals
Anhelina Lysak (POL)	4
Iryna Kurachkina (AIN)	8
Solomiia Vynnyk (UKR)	6
Evelina Nikolova (BUL)	7

Final
Iryna Kurachkina (AIN)	7
Evelina Nikolova (BUL)	2

=== Repechage ===
Repechage round 1
Mihaela Samoil (MDA)	5^{F}
Aurora Russo (ITA)	0
Mathilde Rivière (FRA)	0
Elvira Kamaloğlu (TUR)	2

Bronze medal match
Mihaela Samoil (MDA)	0
Anhelina Lysak (POL)	2^{F}
Elvira Kamaloğlu (TUR)	6
Solomiia Vynnyk (UKR)	10

== Final standing ==
Rank	Athlete
1st place, gold medalist(s)	Iryna Kurachkina (AIN)
2nd place, silver medalist(s)	Evelina Nikolova (BUL)
3rd place, bronze medalist(s)	Anhelina Lysak (POL)
3rd place, bronze medalist(s)	Solomiia Vynnyk (UKR)
5	Mihaela Samoil (MDA)
5	Elvira Kamaloğlu (TUR)
7	Zhala Aliyeva (AZE)
8	Irina Ologonova (AIN)
9	Aurora Russo (ITA)
10	Erika Bognár (HUN)
11	Anna Michalcová (CZE)
12	Graciela Sánchez (ESP)
13	Mathilde Rivière (FRA)
14	Evelina Hulthén (SWE)
15	Ana Maria Puiu (ROU)
