= Mansi Ahlawat =

Indian freestyle wrestler

Personal information
- Nationality: Indian
- Born: Rohtak, Haryana, India

Sport
- Country: India
- Sport: Wrestling
- Weight class: 57 kg; 59 kg
- Event: Freestyle wrestling

Achievements and titles
- World finals: (bronze) 2024
Medal record
Women's freestyle wrestling
Representing India
Event	1st	2nd	3rd
World Championships	-	-	1
Grand Prix	1	-	1
Asian Games	-	-	-
Asian Championships	-	-	-
U23 World Championships	-	-	1
U20 World Championships	-	-	1
U17 World Championships	-	1	-
Total	1	1	4
World Championships
Bronze medal – third place	2024 Tirana	59 kg
Grand Prix
Gold medal – first place	2022 Almaty	57 kg
Bronze medal – third place	2022 Tunis	57 kg
U23 World Championships
Bronze medal – third place	2022 Pontevedra	59 kg
U20 World Championships
Bronze medal – third place	2018 Trnava	57 kg
U17 World Championships
Silver medal – second place	2016 Tbilisi	40 kg

Mansi Ahlawat is an Indian freestyle wrestler. She was part of the Indian wrestling team in the 2022 Asian Games.

== Early life ==
She was born in Rohtak, Haryana into a lower-middle-class family.

== Career ==
She competed at the 2024 Asian Wrestling Olympic Qualification Tournament in Bishkek, Kyrgyzstan hoping to qualify for the 2024 Summer Olympics in Paris, France. She was eliminated in her second match and she did not qualify for the Olympics. She also competed at the 2024 World Wrestling Olympic Qualification Tournament held in Istanbul, Turkey without qualifying for the Olympics.

== Performance results ==
Res.	Record	Opponent	Score	Date	Event	Location
Tied 5th at 57 kg
Loss	10-6	Laylokhon Sobirova (UZB)	0-2, Fall	5 October 2023	2022 Asian Games	(China) Hangzhou
Win	10-5	Bark Jeong-ae (KOR)	2-0	5 October 2023	2022 Asian Games	(China) Hangzhou
Loss	9-5	Tsugumi Sakurai (JPN)	2-5	5 October 2023	2022 Asian Games	(China) Hangzhou
7th at 59 kg
Loss	9-4	Jowita Wrzesień (POL)	3-5	13 September 2022	2022 World Wrestling Championships	(Serbia) Belgrade
Win	9-3	Solomiia Vynnyk (UKR)	8-5	13 September 2022	2022 World Wrestling Championships	(Serbia) Belgrade
(bronze) Bronze Medal at 57 kg
Win	8-3	Helen Maroulis (USA)	5-0	15 July 2022	2022 Zouhaier Sghaier Ranking Series	(Tunisia) Tunis
Loss	7-3	Giullia Penalber (BRA)	1-11, Fall	15 July 2022	2022 Zouhaier Sghaier Ranking Series	(Tunisia) Tunis
Win	7-2	Sandra Paruszewski (GER)	3-0	15 July 2022	2022 Zouhaier Sghaier Ranking Series	(Tunisia) Tunis
Loss	6-2	Helen Maroulis (USA)	5-8	15 July 2022	2022 Zouhaier Sghaier Ranking Series	(Tunisia) Tunis
Win	6-1	Amanda Martinez (USA)	10-0, Fall	15 July 2022	2022 Zouhaier Sghaier Ranking Series	(Tunisia) Tunis
(gold) Gold Medal at 57 kg
Win	5-1	Emma Tissina (KAZ)	3-0	3 June 2022	2022 Bolat Turlykhanov Cup	Almaty, Kazakhstan
Win	4-1	Laura Almagabentova (KAZ)	10-0, Fall	3 June 2022	2022 Bolat Turlykhanov Cup	Almaty, Kazakhstan
Win	3-1	Emma Tissina (KAZ)	6-0	3 June 2022	2022 Bolat Turlykhanov Cup	Almaty, Kazakhstan
Win	2-1	Erdenechimegiin Sumiyaa (MGL)	5-0	3 June 2022	2022 Bolat Turlykhanov Cup	Almaty, Kazakhstan
9th at 57 kg
Loss	1-1	Giullia Penalber (BRA)	4-12	25 February 2022	2022 Yasar Dogu Tournament	(Turkey) Istanbul
Win	1-0	Olga Khoroshavtseva (RUS)	7-0	25 February 2022	2022 Yasar Dogu Tournament	(Turkey) Istanbul
