= Mezhyrichchia =

Village in Lviv Oblast, Ukraine

Mezhyrichchia Межиріччя
- Village
- Location within Lviv Oblast
- Coordinates: 50°19′48″N 24°13′12″E
- Country: Ukraine
- Oblast: Lviv
- Raion: Sheptytskyi
- Hromada: Sheptytskyi
- Area: 1,739 km^{2} (671 sq mi)
- Elevation: 190 m (620 ft)
- Population: 1,087
  - Density: 0.6251/km^{2} (1.619/sq mi)
- CATOTTG code: UA46120130100077494

Mezhyrichchia (Ukrainian: Межиріччя; Polish: Międzyrzecze; until 1940 Parchacz) is a village in Sheptytskyi Raion, Lviv Oblast, Ukraine. It lies on the Rata river. It belongs to Sheptytskyi urban hromada, one of the hromadas of Ukraine.

The village belonged to the starostwo of Bełz at the beginning of the 18th century. Until 1934, it was part of the independent "unit gmina" called Parchacz in the Polish Second Republic. Afterwards the village belonged to the collective rural gmina with the same name in the powiat of Sokal in the Lwów Voivodeship of which it was the seat. The former village of Zawonie was located in that same gmina. As a result of the Soviet invasion of Poland as part of the Second World War in September 1939, the eastern border of Poland was moved westward to the Bug and Solokiya Rivers, resulting in the village as well as the rest of the gnima of Parchacz now being located in the USSR. In 1941 the Germans took control of the area as part of their invasion of the Soviet Union. In 1947 the name of the village was changed to Mezhyrichchia.

Władysław Żeleński (1903-2006) was born in this village. He was a Polish lawyer, historian, publicist, and nephew of Tadeusz Boy-Żeleński.
