= Anhelina Lysak =

Ukrainian-Polish wrestler (born 1998)

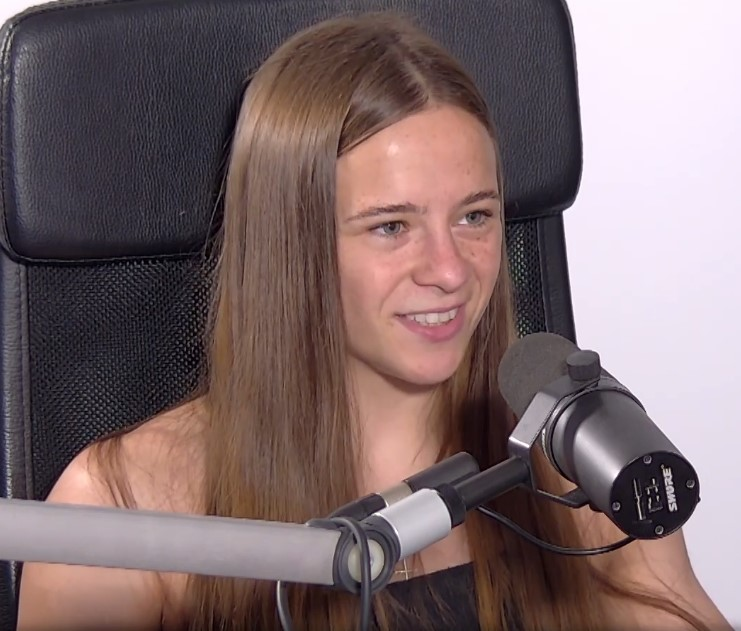
- Lysak in 2024

Personal information
- Native name: Ангеліна Вікторівна Лисак; Anhelina Wiktoriwna Łysak-Pacurkowska
- Born: 12 January 1998 (age 28) Sosnivka, Ukraine
- Height: 160 cm (5 ft 3 in)
- Weight: 57 kg (126 lb)

Sport
- Country: Ukraine (2014–2020); Poland (2021–present)
- Sport: Amateur wrestling
- Weight class: 57 kg
- Event: Freestyle
Medal record
Women's freestyle wrestling
Representing Poland
World Championships
Bronze medal – third place	2022 Belgrade	57 kg
European Championships
Silver medal – second place	2021 Warsaw	57 kg
Bronze medal – third place	2024 Bucharest	57 kg
Grand Prix
Gold medal – first place	2021 Warsaw	59 kg
Gold medal – first place	2022 Madrid	57 kg
Bronze medal – third place	2023 Warsaw	57 kg
World U23 Championships
Gold medal – first place	2021 Belgrade	59 kg
European U23 Championships
Bronze medal – third place	2021 Skopje	62 kg
Representing Ukraine
European Championships
Bronze medal – third place	2020 Rome	59 kg
World U23 Championships
Bronze medal – third place	2019 Budapest	59 kg
European U23 Championships
Silver medal – second place	2016 Ruse	60 kg
Silver medal – second place	2019 Novi Sad	59 kg
World Juniors Championships
Silver medal – second place	2016 Macon	59 kg
European Juniors Championships
Gold medal – first place	2018 Rome	62 kg
World Cadets Championships
Gold medal – first place	2015 Sarajevo	60 kg
Bronze medal – third place	2014 Snina	60 kg
European Cadets Championships
Gold medal – first place	2015 Subotica	60 kg
Bronze medal – third place	2014 Samokov	60 kg

Anhelina Lysak (Ukrainian: Ангеліна Вікторівна Лисак, Polish: Anhelina Wiktoriwna Łysak-Pacurkowska, born 12 January 1998) is a freestyle wrestler. She represented Ukraine until 2020 and she represents Poland as of April 2021. She won one of the bronze medals in the 57 kg event at the 2022 World Wrestling Championships held in Belgrade, Serbia. She is a three-time medalist at the European Wrestling Championships. Lysak represented Poland at the 2024 Summer Olympics in Paris, France. She is married to wrestler Roman Pacurkowski.

== Career ==
Lysak competed in the women's freestyle 60 kg event at the 2016 World Wrestling Championships held in Budapest, Hungary without winning a medal. In 2019, she competed in the 59 kg event at the World Wrestling Championships where she lost her bronze medal match against Baatarjavyn Shoovdor of Mongolia.

At the 2019 World U23 Wrestling Championship held in Budapest, Hungary, Lysak won one of the bronze medals in the 59 kg event. At the 2020 European Wrestling Championships held in Rome, Italy, she won one of the bronze medals in the women's 59 kg event.

In 2021, Lysak won the silver medal in the 57 kg event at the European Wrestling Championships held in Warsaw, Poland. She won one of the bronze medals in her event at the 2021 European U23 Wrestling Championship held in Skopje, North Macedonia. In June 2021, she won the gold medal in her event at the Poland Open held in Warsaw, Poland. At the 2021 U23 World Wrestling Championships held in Belgrade, Serbia, she won the gold medal in the 59 kg event.

In 2022, Lysak lost her bronze medal match in the 57 kg event at the Yasar Dogu Tournament held in Istanbul, Turkey. She also lost her bronze medal match in the 57 kg event at the 2022 European Wrestling Championships held in Budapest, Hungary. She won one of the bronze medals in the 57 kg event at the 2022 World Wrestling Championships held in Belgrade, Serbia.

Lysak won one of the bronze medals in the 57 kg event at the 2024 European Wrestling Championships held in Bucharest, Romania. She competed in the women's 57 kg event at the 2024 Summer Olympics in Paris, France. She was eliminated in her first match by Alina Hrushyna of Ukraine.

She challenged Helen Maroulis for the RAF Women's Bantamweight Championship at RAF Georgia on 11 July 2026 and lost by fall.

== Achievements ==
Year	Tournament	Location	Result	Event
2020	European Championships	Rome, Italy	3rd	Freestyle 59 kg
2021	European Championships	Warsaw, Poland	2nd	Freestyle 57 kg
2022	World Championships	Belgrade, Serbia	3rd	Freestyle 57 kg
2024	European Championships	Bucharest, Romania	3rd	Freestyle 57 kg
