= Sheptytskyi Monastery =

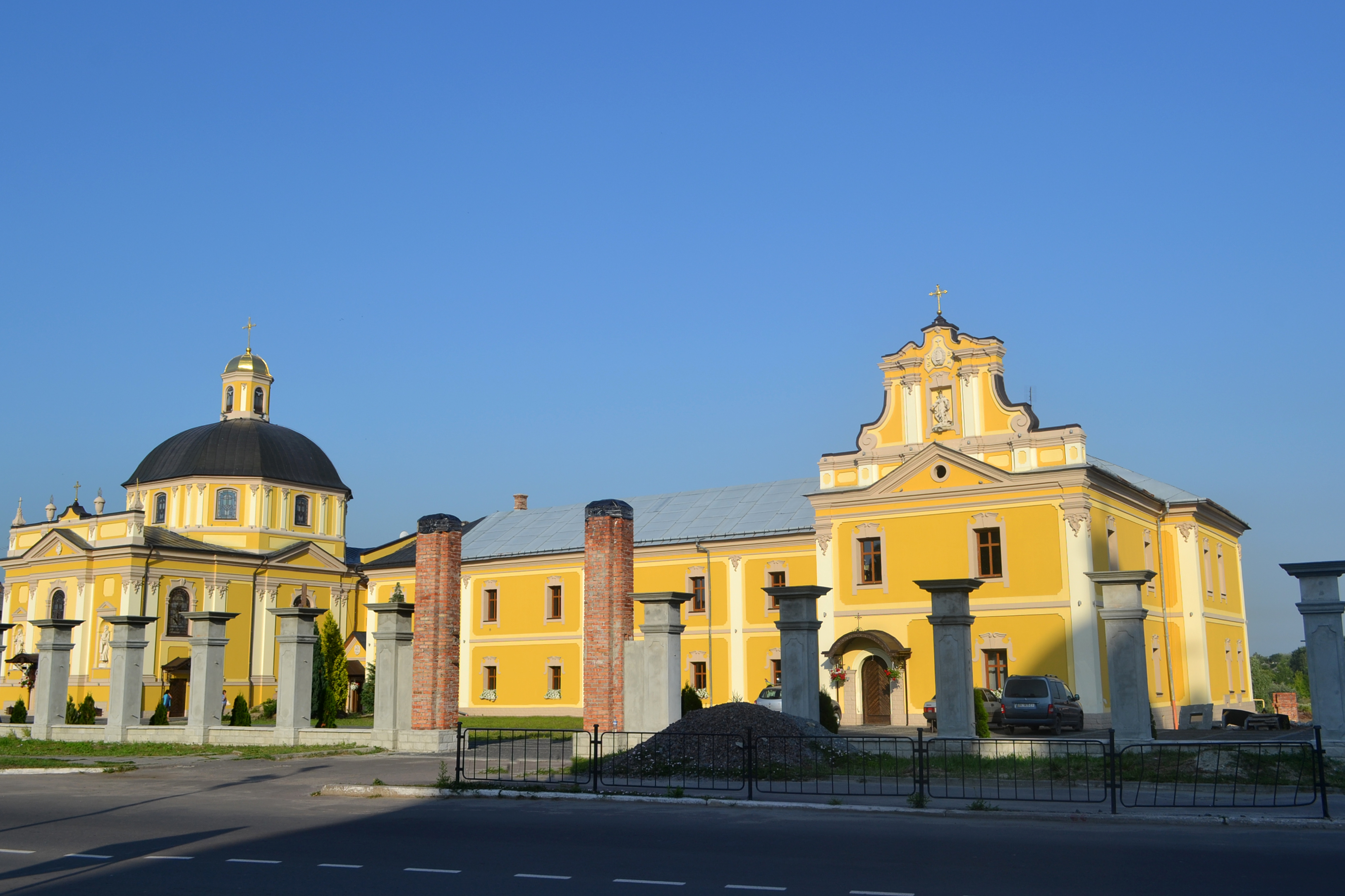
Sheptytskyi Monastery of St. George

The Sheptytskyi Monastery of St. George (Ukrainian: Шептицький монастир) was founded by the Order of St. Basil the Great in the city of Krystopil (now Sheptytskyi, Lviv Oblast) in 1763 thanks to the initiative of Franciszek Salezy Potocki, Voivode of Belz. This monastery is famous for its magnificent Baroque church, which houses a miraculous icon of the Virgin Mary that attracts many pilgrims.

The monastery library was particularly valuable, as it housed rare ancient manuscripts on parchment, including the priceless Horodyshche Apostle (12th century) and Horodyshche Gospel (12th–13th centuries), which originated from the Horodyshche Basilian monastery.

In 1892, the Krystynopil Monastery became an important milestone in the biography of Roman-Maria Sheptytsky, as it was here that he took his perpetual vows. This monastery also served as a place for his teaching activities, where the future Metropolitan Andrey Sheptytsky taught theology.

In 1946, the Soviet regime liquidated the monastery. Later, in 1980, its premises were used as a branch of the Lviv Museum of the History of Religion and Atheism. The revival began in 1989–1990, when the buildings were finally returned to the Basilian monastic order. A new page in history was opened in 1994: the monastery's main relic, the Krystynopil Icon of the Virgin Mary, was returned to it, and a men's lyceum was opened there.

== Hegumens ==
- Teodozii Hryhorovych (1764—1766), first hegumen of the monastery
- Kornylii Srochynskyi (27 March 1766 — 24 September 1776)
- Ampliiat Kryzhanovskyi (1776—1788; † 3.01.1788 in Krystopil)
- Inokentii Kryzhanovskyi (1788—1794)
- Viacheslav Krynytskyi (1794—1810)
- Markiian Tarnavskyi (1810—1815)
- Varlaam Kompanevych (1815—1822)
- Maksymiliian Litynskyi (1822—1826; † 18.12.1826 in Krystopil)
- Mavrykii Halke Vych (1826—1835; † 6.11.1835 in Krystopil)
- Dorotei Pavlovskyi (1835—1840)
- Orest Kachkovskyi (1840—1855; † 4.04.1855 in Krystopil)
- Antonii Kuchynskyi (1855—1888)
- Vid Dobromylskoi reformy:
- Antonii Mil TI (14 September–19 December 1888)
- Franciszek Radecki TI (1888—1894)
- Dionisii Tkachuk (1894—1896)
- Aloiz Varol TI (1896—1898)
- Stanisław Lic TI (1898—1900)
- Feliks Vertsinskyi TI (1900—1901)
- Yeronim Malytskyi (1901—1902)
- Anastasii Kalysh (1902—1905)
- Yeronim Malytskyi (1905—1906)
- Onufrii Burdiak (1906—1912)
- Ihnatii Tysovskyi (1912—1918)
- Meletii Lonchyna (1918—1928)
- Platon Martyniuk (1928—1931)
- Yosyf Zahviiskyi (1931—1937)
- Platon Martyniuk (1937—1942)
- Pavlo Teodorovych (1942—1943)
- Volodymyr Kovalyk (1943—1946)
- Marian Chorneha (1990—1992, first hegumen of the restored monastery)
- Damian Kastran
- Symeon Chmola
- Nazarii Lekh
- Martyn Khaburskyi (2005—2007)
- Ihnatii Moskalyuk (2007—2020)
- Yeremiia Rybakov (2020—2024)
- Yoan Shkolyk (from 2024)
