= 2022 U23 World Wrestling Championships – Women's freestyle 59 kg =

Wrestling competitions

Women's freestyle 59 kg at the 2022 U23 World Championships
- Venue: Pontevedra Municipal Sports Hall
- Dates: 19–20 October
- Competitors: 19 from 19 nations

Medalists
gold medal	Himeka Tokuhara	Japan
silver medal	Magdalena Głodek	Poland
bronze medal	Solomiia Vynnyk	Ukraine
bronze medal	Mansi Ahlawat	India

The women's freestyle 59 kilograms is a competition featured at the 2022 U23 World Wrestling Championships, and was held in Pontevedra, Spain on 19 and 20 October 2022. The qualification rounds were held on 19 October while medal matches were held on the 2nd day of the competition. A total of 19 wrestlers competed in this event, limited to athletes whose body weight was less than 59 kilograms.

This freestyle wrestling competition consists of a single-elimination tournament, with a repechage used to determine the winner of two bronze medals. The two finalists face off for gold and silver medals. Each wrestler who loses to one of the two finalists moves into the repechage, culminating in a pair of bronze medal matches featuring the semifinal losers each facing the remaining repechage opponent from their half of the bracket.

== Results ==
Legend

- F — Won by fall
- WO — Won by walkover

=== Final ===
Final
Himeka Tokuhara (JPN)	3
Magdalena Głodek (POL)	2

=== Top half ===
Round of 32
Ameyalli Jessel (MEX)	0
Himeka Tokuhara (JPN)	10

Round of 16
Gaëlle Ruiz (FRA)	0
Katherine Rentería (COL)	10
Himeka Tokuhara (JPN)	6
Solomiia Vynnyk (UKR)	1
Karoline Ortiz (PUR)	4
Lexie Basham (USA)	8
Anne Nürnberger (GER)	4
Diana Kayumova (KAZ)	3

Quarterfinals
Katherine Rentería (COL)	2
Himeka Tokuhara (JPN)	4^{F}
Lexie Basham (USA)	7^{F}
Anne Nürnberger (GER)	0

Semifinals
Himeka Tokuhara (JPN)	9
Lexie Basham (USA)	0

=== Bottom half ===
Round of 32
Fatma Shaban (BUL)	0
Evelina Hulthén (SWE)	10
Ramina Mamedova (LAT)	2^{F}
María Ramos (ESP)	0

Round of 16
Zhala Aliyeva (AZE)	4
Mansi Ahlawat (IND)	10
Evelina Hulthén (SWE)	1
Magdalena Głodek (POL)	6
Nikolett Szabó (HUN)	0
Ramina Mamedova (LAT)	4^{F}
Ebru Dağbaşı (TUR)	6
Ana Maria Puiu (ROU)	5

Quarterfinals
Mansi Ahlawat (IND)	2
Magdalena Głodek (POL)	3
Ramina Mamedova (LAT)	8
Ebru Dağbaşı (TUR)	5

Semifinals
Magdalena Głodek (POL)	8
Ramina Mamedova (LAT)	2

=== Repechage ===
Repechage round 1
Ameyalli Jessel (MEX)	0
Solomiia Vynnyk (UKR)	10

Repechage round 2
Solomiia Vynnyk (UKR)	7
Katherine Rentería (COL)	0
Evelina Hulthén (SWE)	0
Mansi Ahlawat (IND)	6

Bronze medals
Solomiia Vynnyk (UKR)	10
Lexie Basham (USA)	0
Mansi Ahlawat (IND)	WO
Ramina Mamedova (LAT)

== Final standing ==
Rank	Athlete
1st place, gold medalist(s)	Himeka Tokuhara (JPN)
2nd place, silver medalist(s)	Magdalena Głodek (POL)
3rd place, bronze medalist(s)	Solomiia Vynnyk (UKR)
3rd place, bronze medalist(s)	Mansi Ahlawat (IND)
5	Lexie Basham (USA)
5	Ramina Mamedova (LAT)
7	Evelina Hulthén (SWE)
8	Katherine Rentería (COL)
9	Ebru Dağbaşı (TUR)
10	Anne Nürnberger (GER)
11	Ana Maria Puiu (ROU)
12	Karoline Ortiz (PUR)
13	Zhala Aliyeva (AZE)
14	Diana Kayumova (KAZ)
15	María Ramos (ESP)
16	Nikolett Szabó (HUN)
17	Gaëlle Ruiz (FRA)
18	Fatma Shaban (BUL)
19	Ameyalli Jessel (MEX)
