= 2025 European Wrestling Championships – Women's freestyle 57 kg =

Wrestling competition

Women's freestyle 57 kg at the 2025 European Wrestling Championships
- Venue: X-Bionic Sphere
- Location: Bratislava, Slovakia
- Dates: 10-11 April
- Competitors: 12

Medalists
| gold medal | Olga Khoroshavtseva |
| silver medal | Elvira Süleyman Kamaloğlu | Turkey |
| bronze medal | Zhala Aliyeva | Azerbaijan |
| bronze medal | Solomiia Vynnyk | Ukraine |

The women's freestyle 57 kg is a competition featured at the 2025 European Wrestling Championships, and was held in Bratislava, Slovakia on April 10 and 11.

== Results ==
Legend

- F — Won by fall
- R — Retired

=== Main bracket ===
Round of 16
Sezen Belberova (BUL) | 4
Jenna Hemiä (FIN) | 4^{F}
Magdalena Głodek (POL) | 8
Graciela Sánchez (ESP) | 1
Aryna Martynava (UWW) | 1
Olga Khoroshavtseva (UWW) | 7
Mihaela Samoil (MDA) | 0
Solomiia Vynnyk (UKR) | 10

Quarterfinals
Elvira Süleyman Kamaloğlu (TUR) | 10
Jenna Hemiä (FIN) | 0
Magdalena Głodek (POL) | 2
Zhala Aliyeva (AZE) | 4^{F}
Evelina Hulthén (SWE) | 0
Olga Khoroshavtseva (UWW) | 6
Solomiia Vynnyk (UKR) | 12
Tamara Dollák (HUN) | 3

Semifinals
Elvira Süleyman Kamaloğlu (TUR) | 4
Zhala Aliyeva (AZE) | 2^{R}
Olga Khoroshavtseva (UWW) | 9
Solomiia Vynnyk (UKR) | 4

Final
Elvira Süleyman Kamaloğlu (TUR) | 4
Olga Khoroshavtseva (UWW) | 6

=== Repechage ===
Repechage round 1
Aryna Martynava (UWW) | 10
Evelina Hulthén (SWE) | 0

Bronze medal match
Jenna Hemiä (FIN) | 3
Zhala Aliyeva (AZE) | 10
Aryna Martynava (UWW) | 3
Solomiia Vynnyk (UKR) | 4

== Final standing ==
| Rank | Athlete |
|---|---|
| 1st place, gold medalist(s) | Olga Khoroshavtseva (UWW) |
| 2nd place, silver medalist(s) | Elvira Süleyman Kamaloğlu (TUR) |
| 3rd place, bronze medalist(s) | Zhala Aliyeva (AZE) |
| 3rd place, bronze medalist(s) | Solomiia Vynnyk (UKR) |
| 5 | Jenna Hemiä (FIN) |
| 5 | Aryna Martynava (UWW) |
| 7 | Magdalena Głodek (POL) |
| 8 | Tamara Dollák (HUN) |
| 9 | Graciela Sánchez (ESP) |
| 10 | Sezen Belberova (BUL) |
| 11 | Mihaela Samoil (MDA) |
| 12 | Evelina Hulthén (SWE) |
