= Hirnyk, Lviv Oblast =

Rural locality in Lviv Oblast, Ukraine

Hirnyk Гірник
- Rural settlement
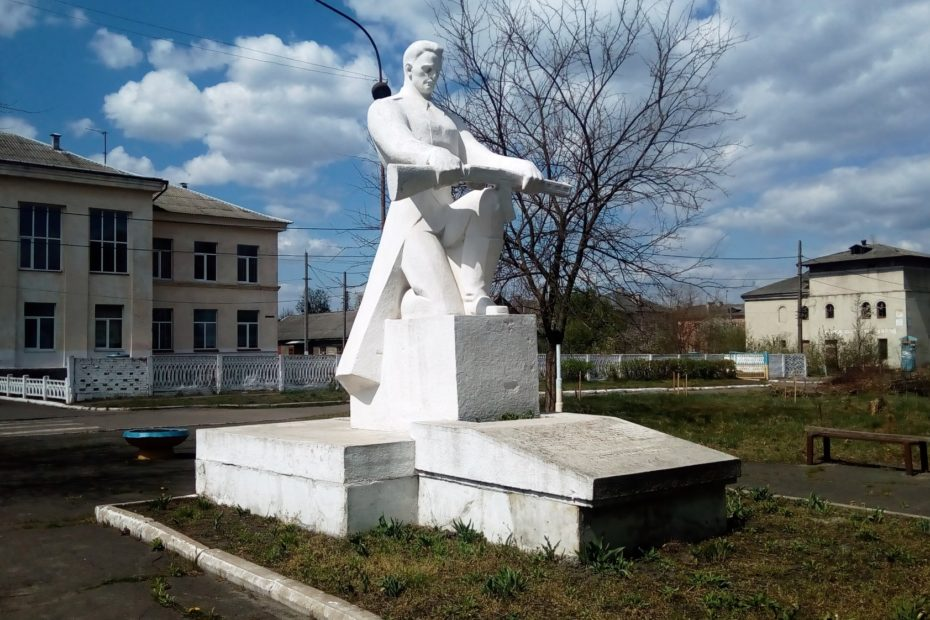

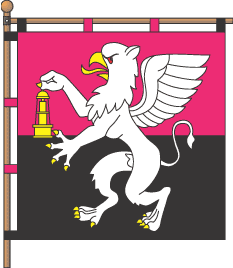
- Flag Coat of arms

- Location within Ukraine Location within Lviv Oblast
- Coordinates: 50°20′33″N 24°12′24″E
- Country: Ukraine
- Oblast: Lviv Oblast
- Raion: Sheptytskyi Raion
- Hromada: Sheptytskyi urban hromada
- Established: 1954
- Elevation: 193 m (633 ft)

Population (2024)
  - Total: 2,658
- Postal code: 80191

Hirnyk (Ukrainian: Гірник pronounced [ɦirˈnɪk], Russian: Горняк) is a rural settlement in Sheptytskyi Raion, Lviv Oblast (region) of Ukraine. It belongs to Sheptytskyi urban hromada, one of the hromadas of Ukraine. Population: 2,820 (2022 estimate).

== History ==
The settlement was occupied by Nazi-German forces during World War II.

Until 18 July 2020, Hirnyk belonged to Chervonohrad Municipality. As part of the administrative reform of Ukraine, which reduced the number of raions of Lviv Oblast to seven, Chervonohrad Municipality was merged into newly established Chervonohrad Raion (now Sheptytskyi Raion).

Until 26 January 2024, Hirnyk was designated urban-type settlement. On this day, a new law entered into force which abolished this status, and Hirnyk became a rural settlement.
