= 2021 European Wrestling Championships – Women's freestyle 57 kg =

Wrestling competition

The women's freestyle 57 kg is a competition featured at the 2021 European Wrestling Championships, and was held in Warsaw, Poland on April 22 and April 23.

== Medalists ==
Gold	Iryna Kurachkina; Belarus
Silver	Anhelina Lysak; Poland
Bronze	Alina Hrushyna; Ukraine
Bronze	Evelina Nikolova; Bulgaria

== Results ==
Legend

- F — Won by fall

1/8 finals
Evelina Nikolova (BUL)	0
Iryna Kurachkina (BLR)	10
Mathilde Rivière (FRA)	11
Sandra Paruszewski (GER)	9

Quarterfinals
Anhelina Lysak (POL)	6^{F}
Francesca Indelicato (ITA)	0
Mehlika Öztürk (TUR)	0
Alina Hrushyna (UKR)	2^{F}
Ramóna Galambos (HUN)	3
Svetlana Lipatova (RUS)	5
Iryna Kurachkina (BLR)	12
Mathilde Rivière (FRA)	2

Semifinals
Anhelina Lysak (POL)	3^{F}
Alina Hrushyna (UKR)	8
Svetlana Lipatova (RUS)	0
Iryna Kurachkina (BLR)	11

Final
Anhelina Lysak (POL)	4
Iryna Kurachkina (BLR)	15

Repechage round 1
Evelina Nikolova (BUL)	5^{F}
Mathilde Rivière (FRA)	9

Bronze medal match
Francesca Indelicato (ITA)	0
Alina Hrushyna (UKR)	6^{F}
Evelina Nikolova (BUL)	8
Svetlana Lipatova (RUS)	7

== Final standing ==
Rank	Athlete
1st place, gold medalist(s)	Iryna Kurachkina (BLR)
2nd place, silver medalist(s)	Anhelina Lysak (POL)
3rd place, bronze medalist(s)	Alina Hrushyna (UKR)
3rd place, bronze medalist(s)	Evelina Nikolova (BUL)
5	Francesca Indelicato (ITA)
5	Svetlana Lipatova (RUS)
7	Mathilde Rivière (FRA)
8	Sandra Paruszewski (GER)
9	Ramóna Galambos (HUN)
10	Mehlika Öztürk (TUR)
