= Elvira Süleyman Kamaloğlu =

Turkish freestyle wrestler

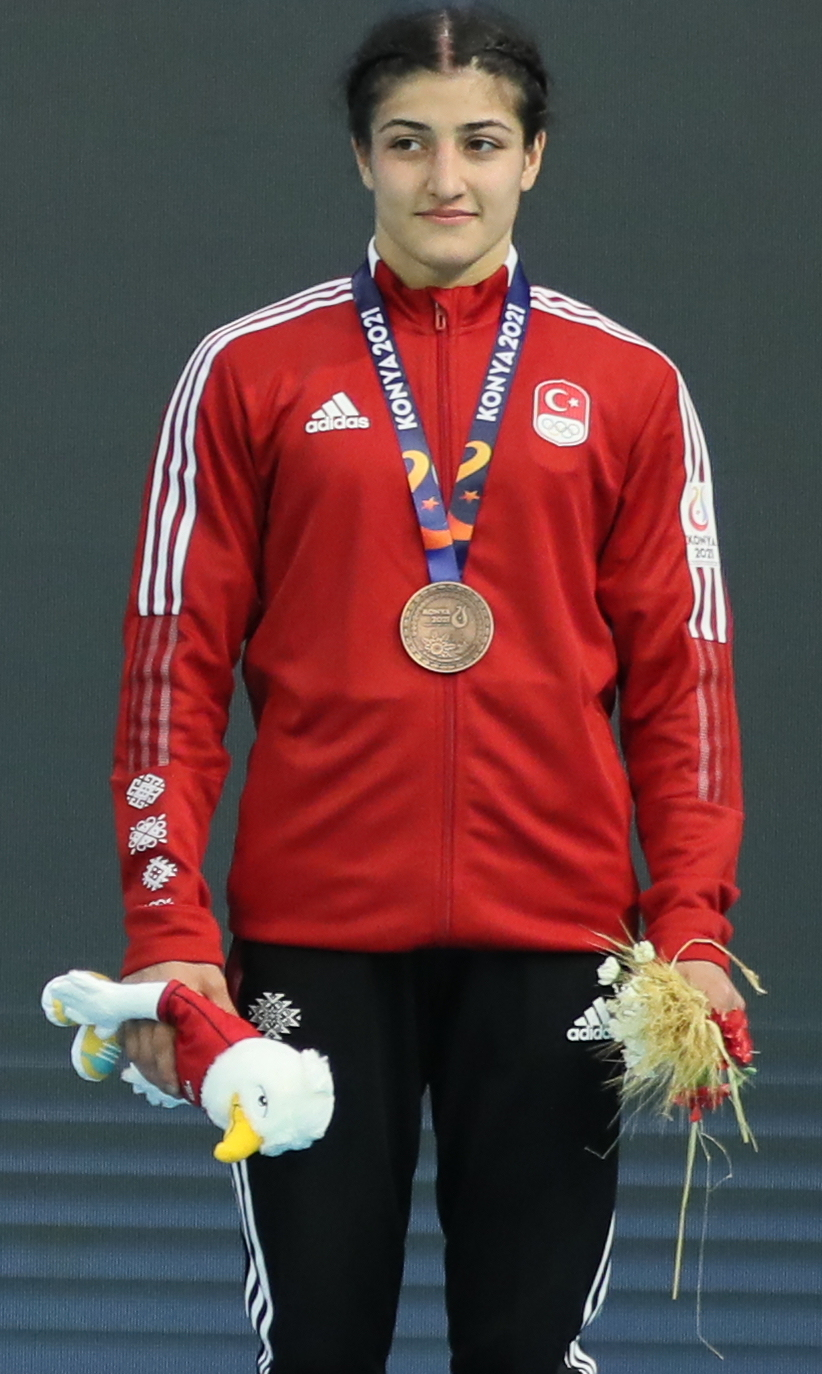
- Kamaloğlu in 2022

Personal information
- Born: Elvira Kamaloğlu; 24 September 2001 (age 24) Donbas, Ukraine
- Height: 1.65 m (5 ft 5 in)
- Weight: 57 kg (126 lb)

Sport
- Country: Turkey
- Sport: Women's freestyle wrestling
- Event: 57 kg
- Club: Istanbul BB SK
Medal record
Women's freestyle wrestling
Representing Turkey
European Championships
Silver medal – second place	2025 Bratislava	57 kg
Silver medal – second place	2026 Tirana	57 kg
Islamic Solidarity Games
Silver medal – second place	2025 Riyadh	57 kg
Bronze medal – third place	2021 Konya	57 kg
Mediterranean Games
Gold medal – first place	2026 Taranto	57 kg
Yasar Dogu Tournament
Gold medal – first place	2023 Istanbul	57 kg
Gold medal – first place	2026 Antalya	57 kg
Grand Prix
Silver medal – second place	2022 Tunis	57 kg
Silver medal – second place	2022 Rome	57 kg
Silver medal – second place	2025 Tirana	57 kg
Bronze medal – third place	2025 Ulaanbaatar	57 kg
FISU World Cup
Silver medal – second place	2022 Samsun	57 kg
World U23 Championships
Bronze medal – third place	2022 Pontevedra	55 kg
Bronze medal – third place	2023 Tirana	57 kg
European U23 Championships
Gold medal – first place	2022 Plovdiv	57 kg
Silver medal – second place	2024 Baku	57 kg
World Juniors Championships
Bronze medal – third place	2021 Ufa	57 kg

Elvira Süleyman Kamaloğlu (née Elvira Kamaloğlu; born 24 September 2001) is a Ukrainian-born Turkish freestyle wrestler competing in the 57 kg division. She is a member of Istanbul BB SK

== Career ==
In 2021, Elvira Kamaloğlu won a bronze medal in the women's 57 kg event at the 2021 World Junior Wrestling Championships in Russia.

Elvira Kamaloğlu won the gold medal in the women's 57kg at the European Under-23 Wrestling Championships in Bulgaria. Elvira beat Spain's Victoria Báez-Dilone, Poland's Patrycja Gil, Bulgaria's Sezen Behcetova Belberova, and finally, Hungary's Tamara Dollak to win gold the women's 57kg at the European Under-23 Wrestling Championships in Plovdiv.

She lost her bronze medal match in the 57 kg event at the 2022 European Wrestling Championships held in Budapest, Hungary. A few months later, she won the silver medal in her event at the Matteo Pellicone Ranking Series 2022 held in Rome, Italy. She also won the silver medal in her event at the 2022 Tunis Ranking Series event held in Tunis, Tunisia. She competed in the 55 kg event at the 2022 World Wrestling Championships held in Belgrade, Serbia. She won one of the bronze medals in the 55 kg event at the 2022 U23 World Wrestling Championships held in Pontevedra, Spain.

She competed at the 2024 European Wrestling Olympic Qualification Tournament in Baku, Azerbaijan hoping to qualify for the 2024 Summer Olympics in Paris, France. She was eliminated in her second match and she did not qualify for the Olympics.

Elvira Süleyman Kamaloğlu represented Türkiye in the women's freestyle 57 kg event at the 2025 European Wrestling Championships, held in Bucharest, Romania. After receiving a bye in the first round, she defeated Finland's Jenna Hemiä by technical superiority 10–0 in the quarterfinals, and went on to beat Azerbaijan's Zhala Aliyeva 4–2 in the semifinals. In the final, she faced Olga Khoroshavtseva, who competed as a neutral athlete (UWW), and lost the match 6–4 to claim the silver medal.

== Personal life ==
Kamaloğlu is of Turkish Meskhetian origin.
