= Sheptytskyi urban hromada =

Urban hromada in Lviv Oblast, Ukraine

Sheptytskyi urban hromada Шептицька міська громада
- Hromada
- Interactive map of Sheptytskyi urban hromada
- Country: Ukraine
- Oblast: Lviv Oblast
- Raion: Sheptytskyi Raion
- Admin. center: Sheptytskyi

Area
  - Total: 228.1 km^{2} (88.1 sq mi)

Population (2022)
  - Total: 88,151
  - Density: 386.5/km^{2} (1,001/sq mi)
- CATOTTG code: UA46120130000026331
- Settlements: 14
- Cities: 2
- Rural settlements: 1
- Villages: 11
- Website: sheptytska-rada.gov.ua

Sheptytskyi urban hromada (Ukrainian: Шептицька міська громада, romanized: Sheptyts'ka mis'ka hromada) is an urban hromada (municipality) located in Ukraine's western Lviv Oblast, in Sheptytskyi Raion. Its administrative centre is the city of Sheptytskyi.

Sheptytskyi urban hromada has an area of 228.1 square kilometres (88.1 mi^{2}). The population of the hromada is 88,151 (2022 estimate).

Until 18 July 2020, Chervonohrad (known as Sheptytskyi since 2024) was designated as a city of regional significance. As part of the administrative reform of Ukraine, which reduced the number of raions of Lviv Oblast to seven, Chervonohrad was merged into the newly established Chervonohrad Raion. Before being abolished, Chervonohrad's municipality also included the city of Sosnivka (until 2019) and the urban-type settlement of Hirnyk.

On 26 November 2025, the Cabinet of Ministers of Ukraine approved the renaming of the Chervonohrad urban hromada to Sheptytskyi urban hromada due to the renaming of the administrative center a year earlier.

== Settlements ==
In addition to two cities (Sheptytskyi and Sosnivka) and one rural settlement (Hirnyk), Sheptytskyi urban hromada includes the following 11 villages:

- Bendiuha
- Boriatyn
- Berezhne
- Volsvyn
- Horodyshche
- Dobriachyn
- Mezhyrichchia
- Ostriv
- Pozdymyr
- Rudka
- Silets
