= 2021 U23 World Wrestling Championships – Women's freestyle 59 kg =

The women's freestyle 59 kilograms is a competition featured at the 2021 U23 World Wrestling Championships, and was held in Belgrade, Serbia on 3 and 4 November.

== Medalists ==
Gold	Anhelina Lysak (POL)
Silver	Solomiia Vynnyk (UKR)
Bronze	Kristina Sazykina (BLR)
Bronze	Anna Szél (HUN)

== Results ==
Legend

- F — Won by fall

=== Main bracket ===
Round of 16
Kristina Sazykina (BLR)	6
Michaela Beck (USA)	1
Anastasia Nichita (MDA)	4
Solomiia Vynnyk (UKR)	4
Erin Rainville (CAN)	0
Anna Szél (HUN)	10
Atika El-Asla (MAR)	0
Ebru Dağbaşı (TUR)	4^{F}
Anastasiia Sidelnikova (RUS)	10
Pushpa Yadav (IND)	0
Anne Nürnberger (GER)	0
Anhelina Lysak (POL)	10

Quarterfinals
Diana Kayumova (KAZ)	0
Ramina Mamedova (LAT)	8^{F}
Kristina Sazykina (BLR)	6
Solomiia Vynnyk (UKR)	8
Anna Szél (HUN)	6
Ebru Dağbaşı (TUR)	2
Anastasiia Sidelnikova (RUS)	0
Anhelina Lysak (POL)	11^{F}

Semifinals
Ramina Mamedova (LAT)	0
Solomiia Vynnyk (UKR)	10
Anna Szél (HUN)	1
Anhelina Lysak (POL)	6

Final
Solomiia Vynnyk (UKR)	2
Anhelina Lysak (POL)	7

=== Repechage ===
Repechage round
Anastasia Nichita (MDA)
Kristina Sazykina (BLR)	WO
Anne Nürnberger (GER)	1
Anastasiia Sidelnikova (RUS)	12

Bronze medals
Kristina Sazykina (BLR)	10
Ramina Mamedova (LAT)	0
Anastasiia Sidelnikova (RUS)	3
Anna Szél (HUN)	3
