= 2024 U23 World Wrestling Championships – Women's freestyle 59 kg =

Wrestling competitions

Women's freestyle 59 kg at the 2024 U23 World Championships
- Venue: Tirana Olympic Park
- Dates: 23–24 October
- Competitors: 20 from 18 nations

Medalists
gold medal	Solomiia Vynnyk	Ukraine
silver medal	Anjali Gahlawat	India
bronze medal	Himeka Tokuhara	Japan
bronze medal	Liang Hong	China

The women's freestyle 59 is a competition featured at the 2024 U23 World Wrestling Championships, and was held in Tirana, Albania on 23 and 24 October 2024.

This freestyle wrestling competition consists of a single-elimination tournament, with a repechage used to determine the winner of two bronze medals. The two finalists face off for gold and silver medals. Each wrestler who loses to one of the two finalists moves into the repechage, culminating in a pair of bronze medal matches featuring the semifinal losers each facing the remaining repechage opponent from their half of the bracket.

== Results ==
Legend

- F — Won by fall
- R — Retired

=== Final ===
Final
Solomiia Vynnyk (UKR)	7
Anjali Gahlawat (IND)	4

=== Top half ===
Round of 32
Guldana Bekesh (KAZ)	1
Himeka Tokuhara (JPN)	7
Sezim Zhumanazarova (KGZ)	10
Byambasürengiin Khulan (MGL)	1^{R}

Round of 16
Alesia Hetmanava (AIN)	10
Skye Realin (USA)	0
Himeka Tokuhara (JPN)	10
Julia Nowicka (POL)	0
Solomiia Vynnyk (UKR)	10
Sezim Zhumanazarova (KGZ)	0
Alexa Cuero (COL)	5
Anastasiia Sidelnikova (AIN)	12

Quarterfinals
Alesia Hetmanava (AIN)	1
Himeka Tokuhara (JPN)	7
Solomiia Vynnyk (UKR)	8
Anastasiia Sidelnikova (AIN)	2

Semifinals
Himeka Tokuhara (JPN)	2
Solomiia Vynnyk (UKR)	5

=== Bottom half ===
Round of 32
Gabriela Cross (CAN)	0
Othelie Høie (NOR)	11
Liang Hong (CHN)	10
Gabrielė Dilytė (LTU)	0

Round of 16
Aurora Russo (ITA)	8
Merve Karadeniz (TUR)	1
Othelie Høie (NOR)	10
Zineb Hassoune (MAR)	6
Heung Tsz Ying (HKG)	0
Liang Hong (CHN)	10
Anjali Gahlawat (IND)	10
Gular Habibova (AZE)	0

Quarterfinals
Aurora Russo (ITA)	5
Othelie Høie (NOR)	2
Liang Hong (CHN)	5
Anjali Gahlawat (IND)	9

Semifinals
Aurora Russo (ITA)	0
Anjali Gahlawat (IND)	4^{F}

=== Repechage ===
Repechage round 2
Sezim Zhumanazarova (KGZ)	2
Anastasiia Sidelnikova (AIN)	8
Gular Habibova (AZE)	0
Liang Hong (CHN)	4^{F}

Bronze medals
Anastasiia Sidelnikova (AIN)	1
Himeka Tokuhara (JPN)	6
Liang Hong (CHN)	6^{F}
Aurora Russo (ITA)	1

== Final standing ==
Rank	Athlete
1st place, gold medalist(s)	Solomiia Vynnyk (UKR)
2nd place, silver medalist(s)	Anjali Gahlawat (IND)
3rd place, bronze medalist(s)	Himeka Tokuhara (JPN)
3rd place, bronze medalist(s)	Liang Hong (CHN)
5	Anastasiia Sidelnikova (AIN)
5	Aurora Russo (ITA)
7	Othelie Høie (NOR)
8	Sezim Zhumanazarova (KGZ)
9	Alesia Hetmanava (AIN)
10	Zineb Hassoune (MAR)
11	Alexa Cuero (COL)
12	Guldana Bekesh (KAZ)
13	Merve Karadeniz (TUR)
14	Byambasürengiin Khulan (MGL)
15	Skye Realin (USA)
16	Julia Nowicka (POL)
17	Heung Tsz Ying (HKG)
18	Gabrielė Dilytė (LTU)
19	Gabriela Cross (CAN)
20	Gular Habibova (AZE)
