= 2022 U23 World Wrestling Championships – Women's freestyle 55 kg =

Wrestling competitions

Women's freestyle 55 kg at the 2022 U23 World Championships
- Venue: Pontevedra Municipal Sports Hall
- Dates: 19–20 October
- Competitors: 13 from 13 nations

Medalists
gold medal	Moe Kiyooka	Japan
silver medal	Mihaela Samoil	Moldova
bronze medal	Alisha Howk	United States
bronze medal	Elvira Kamaloğlu	Turkey

The women's freestyle 55 kilograms is a competition featured at the 2022 U23 World Wrestling Championships, and was held in Pontevedra, Spain on 19 and 20 October 2022. The qualification rounds were held on 19 October while medal matches were held on the 2nd day of the competition. A total of 13 wrestlers competed in this event, limited to athletes whose body weight was less than 55 kilograms.

This freestyle wrestling competition consists of a single-elimination tournament, with a repechage used to determine the winner of two bronze medals. The two finalists face off for gold and silver medals. Each wrestler who loses to one of the two finalists moves into the repechage, culminating in a pair of bronze medal matches featuring the semifinal losers each facing the remaining repechage opponent from their half of the bracket.

== Results ==
Legend

- F — Won by fall
- R — Retired
- WO — Won by walkover

=== Main bracket ===
Round of 16
Tatiana Hurtado (COL)	2
Nethmi Poruthotage (SRI)	7
Elnura Mammadova (AZE)	4^{F}
Andreea Ana (ROU)	1
Erika Bognár (HUN)	1
Alisha Howk (USA)	2
Laura Gómez (ESP)	0
Virginie Kaze-Gascon (CAN)	10
Moe Kiyooka (JPN)	8
Oleksandra Khomenets (UKR)	0^{R}

Quarterfinals
Mihaela Samoil (MDA)	15
Nethmi Poruthotage (SRI)	9
Elnura Mammadova (AZE)	2^{R}
Alisha Howk (USA)	6
Zeinep Bayanova (KAZ)	0
Virginie Kaze-Gascon (CAN)	10
Moe Kiyooka (JPN)	11
Elvira Kamaloğlu (TUR)	0

Semifinals
Mihaela Samoil (MDA)	9
Alisha Howk (USA)	8
Virginie Kaze-Gascon (CAN)	0
Moe Kiyooka (JPN)	10

Final
Mihaela Samoil (MDA)	0
Moe Kiyooka (JPN)	13

=== Repechage ===
Repechage round
Oleksandra Khomenets (UKR)
Elvira Kamaloğlu (TUR)	WO

Bronze medals
Nethmi Poruthotage (SRI)	5
Alisha Howk (USA)	13
Elvira Kamaloğlu (TUR)	8
Virginie Kaze-Gascon (CAN)	4

== Final standing ==
Rank	Athlete
1st place, gold medalist(s)	Moe Kiyooka (JPN)
2nd place, silver medalist(s)	Mihaela Samoil (MDA)
3rd place, bronze medalist(s)	Alisha Howk (USA)
3rd place, bronze medalist(s)	Elvira Kamaloğlu (TUR)
5	Nethmi Poruthotage (SRI)
5	Virginie Kaze-Gascon (CAN)
7	Elnura Mammadova (AZE)
8	Tatiana Hurtado (COL)
9	Erika Bognár (HUN)
10	Andreea Ana (ROU)
11	Oleksandra Khomenets (UKR)
12	Zeinep Bayanova (KAZ)
13	Laura Gómez (ESP)
