= 2022 European Wrestling Championships – Women's freestyle 57 kg =

Wrestling competition

Women's freestyle 57 kg at the 2022 European Wrestling Championships
- Venue: BOK Sports Hall
- Location: Budapest, Hungary
- Dates: 31 March - 1 April
- Competitors: 9

Medalists
gold medal	Alina Hrushyna	Ukraine
silver medal	Evelina Nikolova	Bulgaria
bronze medal	Tamara Dollák	Hungary
bronze medal	Sandra Paruszewski	Germany

The women's freestyle 57 kg was a competition featured at the 2022 European Wrestling Championships, and was held in Budapest, Hungary on March 31 and 1 April.

== Results ==
Legend

- F — Won by fall

=== Main Bracket ===
1/8 finals
Jenna Hemiä (FIN)	5
Tamara Dollák (HUN)	12^{F}

Quarterfinals
Evelina Nikolova (BUL)	12^{F}
Tamara Dollák (HUN)	1
Graciela Sánchez (ESP)	2
Elvira Kamaloğlu (TUR)	9
Sandra Paruszewski (GER)	8
Kateryna Zhydachevska (ROU)	2
Alina Hrushyna (UKR)	10^{F}
Anhelina Lysak (POL)	1

Semifinals
Evelina Nikolova (BUL)	6^{F}
Elvira Kamaloğlu (TUR)	2
Sandra Paruszewski (GER)	1
Alina Hrushyna (UKR)	8

Final
Evelina Nikolova (BUL)	2
Alina Hrushyna (UKR)	6

=== Repechage ===
Bronze medal match
Tamara Dollák (HUN)	7
Elvira Kamaloğlu (TUR)	2
Anhelina Lysak (POL)	2
Sandra Paruszewski (GER)	4

== Final standing ==
Rank	Wrestler	UWW Points
1st place, gold medalist(s)	Alina Hrushyna (UKR)	10000
2nd place, silver medalist(s)	Evelina Nikolova (BUL)	8000
3rd place, bronze medalist(s)	Sandra Paruszewski (GER)	6500
3rd place, bronze medalist(s)	Tamara Dollák (HUN)	6500
5	Anhelina Lysak (POL)	5000
5	Elvira Kamaloğlu (TUR)	5000
7	Kateryna Zhydachevska (ROU)	4400
8	Graciela Sánchez (ESP)	4000
9	Jenna Hemiä (FIN)	3500
