= Akhmed Idrisov =

Russian freestyle wrestler

Personal information
- Full name: Akhmed Musaevich Idrisov
- Nationality: Russia
- Born: Ахмед Мусаевич Идрисов; 7 November 1999 (age 27) Mutsalaul, Khasavyurt, Dagestan, Russia
- Height: 160 cm (5 ft 3 in)

Sport
- Country: Russia
- Sport: Amateur wrestling
- Weight class: 57 kg
- Event: Freestyle
Medal record
Men's freestyle wrestling
Representing Russia
European U23 Championships
Gold medal – first place	2021 Skopje	57 kg
World Junior Championships
Gold medal – first place	2018 Trnava	57 kg
Bronze medal – third place	2019 Tallinn	57 kg
Representing Dagestan
All-Russian Spartakiad
Gold medal – first place	2022 Kazan	61 kg
Russian National Championships
Silver medal – second place	2022 Kyzyl	61 kg
Bronze medal – third place	2020 Naro-Fominsk	57 kg
Golden Grand Prix Ivan Yarygin
Silver medal – second place	2023 Krasnoyarsk	57 kg
Silver medal – second place	2022 Krasnoyarsk	57 kg
Silver medal – second place	2020 Krasnoyarsk	57 kg
Bronze medal – third place	2024 Krasnoyarsk	57 kg

Akhmed Musaevich Idrisov (born 7 November 1999) is a Russian freestyle wrestler from Dagestan who competes at 57 kilograms. Idrisov is the reigning U23 European Continental champion, a medalist from the Golden Grand Prix Ivan Yarygin 2020 and the 2020 Russian National Championships and was the 2018 Junior World Champion.

== Major results ==
Year	Competition	Venue	Position	Event	Notes
Representing Russia
2020	Golden Grand Prix Ivan Yarygin	Krasnoyarsk, Russia	2nd	Freestyle 57 kg	
2021	U23 European Championships	Ulan–Ude, Russia	1st	Freestyle 57 kg	

== Career ==
In September 2018, Idrisov became the Junior World Champion at men's freestyle 57 kg. His first international tournament came in November 2018, placing fifth at the Intercontinental Cup. In August 2019, Idrisov placed third at the Junior World Championships, only losing to Cadet World Championship silver medalist Vitali Arujau from the United States. By December 2019, Idrisov claimed the senior level Alans International championship. During 2020, he placed second at the Golden Grand Prix Ivan Yarygin and third at the Russian National Championships. As of 2021, Idrisov has become the U23 European Continental champion.

== Freestyle record ==
International Senior Freestyle Matches
Res.	Record	Opponent	Score	Date	Event	Location
2021 U23 European Championships (gold) at 57 kg
Win	19–4	(Azerbaijan) Aliabbas Rzazade	6–0	May 17–23, 2021	2021 U23 European Continental Championships	Skopje, North Macedonia
Win	18–4	(Ukraine) Kamil Kerymov	TF 10–0	May 17–23, 2021	2021 U23 European Continental Championships	Skopje, North Macedonia
Win	17–4	(Georgia (country)) Ramaz Turmanidze	TF 13–2	May 17–23, 2021	2021 U23 European Continental Championships	Skopje, North Macedonia
2020 Russian Nationals (bronze) at 57 kg
Win	16–4	(Dagestan) Ramiz Gamzatov	3–1	October 16–18, 2020	2020 Russian National Championships	Naro-Fominsk, Russia
Win	15–4	(Dagestan) Said Gazimagomedov	4–4	October 16–18, 2020	2020 Russian National Championships	Naro-Fominsk, Russia
Loss	14–4	(Moscow Oblast) Azamat Tuskaev	6–6	October 16–18, 2020	2020 Russian National Championships	Naro-Fominsk, Russia
Win	14–3	(Tuva) Donduk-ool Khuresh-ool	TF 12–1	October 16–18, 2020	2020 Russian National Championships	Naro-Fominsk, Russia
2020 Golden Grand Prix Ivan Yarygin (silver) at 57 kg
Loss	13–3	(Russia) Azamat Tuskaev	3–10	January 23–26, 2020	Golden Grand Prix Ivan Yarygin 2020	Krasnoyarsk, Russia
Win	13–2	(Russia) Aryan Tsiutryn	12–9	January 23–26, 2020	Golden Grand Prix Ivan Yarygin 2020	Krasnoyarsk, Russia
Win	12–2	(Russia) Petr Konstantinov	7–2	January 23–26, 2020	Golden Grand Prix Ivan Yarygin 2020	Krasnoyarsk, Russia
Win	11–2	(Mongolia) Zanabazar Zandanbud	TF 10–0	January 23–26, 2020	Golden Grand Prix Ivan Yarygin 2020	Krasnoyarsk, Russia
2019 Alans International (gold) at 57 kg
Win	10–2	(Mongolia) Erdenebatyn Bekhbayar	5–2	December 7–8, 2019	2019 Alans International	Vladikavkaz, Russia
Win	9–2	(Russia) Abubakar Mutaliev	Fall	December 7–8, 2019	2019 Alans International	Vladikavkaz, Russia
Win	8–2	(Russia) Kezhik Mongush	TF 14–4	December 7–8, 2019	2019 Alans International	Vladikavkaz, Russia
Win	7–2	(Russia) Azamat Tuskaev	4–0	December 7–8, 2019	2019 Alans International	Vladikavkaz, Russia
Win	6–2	(Armenia) Garik Barseghyan	8–0	December 7–8, 2019	2019 Alans International	Vladikavkaz, Russia
2019–20 Deutsche Ringerliga season 5th as Team VFK Schifferstadt at 60 kg
Win	5–2	(Azerbaijan) Giorgi Edisherashvili	9–4	October 26, 2019	2019–2020 Deutsche Ringerliga season	Germany
Win	4–2	(Cuba) Reineri Andreu	7–0	October 12, 2019	2019–2020 Deutsche Ringerliga season	Germany
2018 Intercontinental Cup 5th at 57 kg
Loss	3–2	(Russia) Jabrail Gairbekov	2–9	November 15–19, 2018	2018 Intercontinental Cup	(Russia) Khasavyurt, Dagestan
Loss	3–1	(Russia) Ramis Gamzatov	0–2	November 15–19, 2018	2018 Intercontinental Cup	(Russia) Khasavyurt, Dagestan
Win	3–0	(Azerbaijan) Islam Bazarganov	4–3	November 15–19, 2018	2018 Intercontinental Cup	(Russia) Khasavyurt, Dagestan
Win	2–0	(Azerbaijan) Mirjalal Hasan Zada	7–4	November 15–19, 2018	2018 Intercontinental Cup	(Russia) Khasavyurt, Dagestan
Win	1–0	(Russia) Abdumazhid Kudiev	6–2	November 15–19, 2018	2018 Intercontinental Cup	(Russia) Khasavyurt, Dagestan
