= Janina Hurynowicz =

Polish neurophysiologist

- Born: 10 November 1894; Krystynopol, (now Chervonohrad, Ukraine)
- Died: 2 October 1967 (aged 72); Toruń, Poland
- Burial place: St. George Cemetery
- Education: Women's Medical Institute; Vilnius University
- Occupations: Physician, neurophysiologist
- Known for: Chronaxie research

Janina Hurynowicz (1894–1967) was a Polish medical doctor, neurophysiologist and neurologist. She was the author of many works on Chronaxie and the influence of insulin on the autonomic nervous system and became a professor at the Nicolaus Copernicus University in Toruń.

== Biography ==
Janina Hurynowicz was born 10 November 1894 in Krystynopol in the territory of the Polish–Lithuanian Commonwealth annexed by Russia.

She graduated from secondary school summa cum laude in Vilnius, now Lithuania, in 1911, and the following year she began her medical studies at the Women's Medical Institute in St. Petersburg, Russia, graduating in 1918 summa cum laude, but she "faced a higher education system closed to women."

=== World War I years ===
During 1918–1920, Hurynowicz enlisted in the Polish army as a captain and physician and worked as a "surgeon, epidemiologist, and neurologist in Russian Civil War hospitals." When a Polish Siberian Division was formed to fight the Russian Bolsheviks, she joined them and was the only woman in the company of thousands of men. She headed the field hospital in Siberia.

When the Bolsheviks won the war 1921, the Red Cross evacuated Hurynowicz with other prisoners of war via Japan, India, France and Germany, and finally to a newly independent Poland. Throughout the journey she attended to the injured prisoners of war.

=== University life ===
From 1922–1933, Hurynowicz progressed through her academic career at the University of Vilnius, from junior assistant to assistant professor of the neurological clinic. She obtained her doctorate on the basis of her work The influence of insulin on the vegetative nervous system in 1927. She spent the period of 1927-1939 in Paris in various scientific institutions learning and writing about the chronaxiometric method of measuring the excitability of the human vasomotor system, work that was lauded by the Paris Academy of Sciences. In 1930, she obtained her habilitation in neurology at the Faculty of Medicine of the Stefan Batory University (now in Vilnius University) and from 1937 she was deputy professor and temporary head of the Neurological and Psychiatric Clinic there.

=== World War II ===
With the inception of the war, beginning in 1939, Hurynowicz became an active member of the Polish Underground State and repeatedly took care of endangered partisans at the risk of her own life. For example, according to Moryś, she saved the life of a notable Polish scholar.

In 1944, after the Red Army reoccupied Vilnius, Olgierd Narkiewicz concealed himself in a mental hospital. Thanks to skilful simulation and the kindness of the Polish doctors, including Dr Janina Hurynowicz, he managed to save himself from deportation to the Soviet Union.

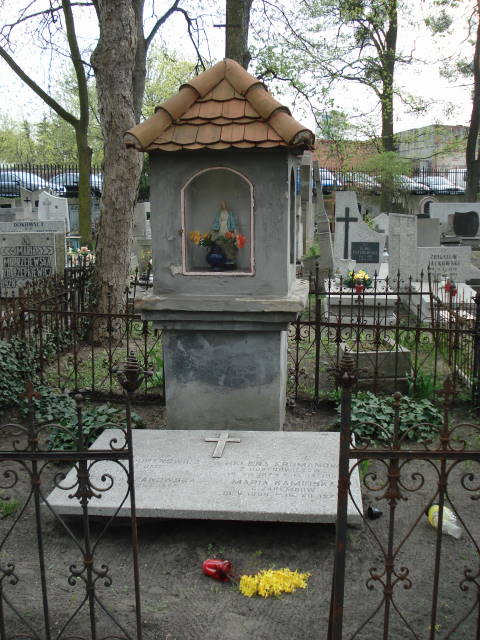
Gravestone of Janina Hurynowicz at the St. George Cemetery in Toruń

In the summer of 1945, after her evacuation from Vilnius, she moved to Toruń, assuming the position of associate professor of the head of the Department of Neurophysiology and Comparative Physiology at the Nicolaus Copernicus University. In 1949 she was promoted to full professor. From 1946, she was involved in organizational work at the emerging branches of the State Institute of Mental Hygiene in Toruń and Bydgoszcz, from which mental health clinics were later established. She remained the director of an outpatient clinic in Toruń until 1954.

Hurynowicz retired at the age of 70 and died 2 October 1967 in Toruń. She was buried there in the St. George Cemetery.

== Selected memberships ==
- Torun Medical Society (founder)
- German Society of Neurologists
- Societé Philomatique
- Association de la Langue Française

== Selected works ==
- Chauchard, A. E., Chauchard, B., & Hurynowicz, J. (1927). Étude quantitative de l'action de l'ion calcium sur l'excitabilité de l'appareil sécrétoire, corde du tympan, glande sous-maxillaire.
- Hurynowicz, J. (1933). Über die normale und pathologische Chronaxie der vasomotorischen Nerven. Pogoń.
- Hurynowicz, J. (1947). L'influence de certaines substances narcotiques... Wydział Nauki M-stwa Oświaty.
- Hurynowicz, J. (1952). The Vestibular System of the Rabbit in Fatigue. Bulletin de la Societe des amis des sciences et des lettres de Poznan. Seria C: Medecine, 3(3), 17-34.
