= 2020 European Wrestling Championships – Women's freestyle 55 kg =

Competition at the 2020 European Wrestling Championships

The women's freestyle 55 kg is a competition featured at the 2020 European Wrestling Championships, and was held in Rome, Italy on February 12 and February 13.

== Medalists ==
Gold	Olga Khoroshavtseva; Russia
Silver	Solomiia Vynnyk; Ukraine
Bronze	Bediha Gün; Turkey
Bronze	Sofia Mattsson; Sweden

== Results ==
Legend

- F — Won by fall

1/8 finals
Andreea Ana (ROU)	12
Alicja Czyżowicz (POL)	1
Sofia Mattsson (SWE)	4^{F}
Evelina Nikolova (BUL)	2

Quarterfinals
Mariana Drăguțan (MDA)	7
Ambra Campagna (ITA)	0
Solomiia Vynnyk (UKR)	11
Bediha Gün (TUR)	5
Ellen Riesterer (GER)	0
Olga Khoroshavtseva (RUS)	11
Andreea Ana (ROU)	0
Sofia Mattsson (SWE)	9^{F}

Semifinals
Mariana Drăguțan (MDA)	9
Solomiia Vynnyk (UKR)	10
Olga Khoroshavtseva (RUS)	10
Sofia Mattsson (SWE)	8

Final
Solomiia Vynnyk (UKR)	0
Olga Khoroshavtseva (RUS)	10

Bronze medal match
Bediha Gün (TUR)	11
Mariana Drăguțan (MDA)	4
Ellen Riesterer (GER)	0
Sofia Mattsson (SWE)	10

== Final standing ==
Rank	Athlete
1st place, gold medalist(s)	Olga Khoroshavtseva (RUS)
2nd place, silver medalist(s)	Solomiia Vynnyk (UKR)
3rd place, bronze medalist(s)	Bediha Gün (TUR)
3rd place, bronze medalist(s)	Sofia Mattsson (SWE)
5	Mariana Drăguțan (MDA)
5	Ellen Riesterer (GER)
7	Andreea Ana (ROU)
8	Alicja Czyżowicz (POL)
9	Evelina Nikolova (BUL)
10	Ambra Campagna (ITA)
