= Władysław Żeleński (lawyer) =

Polish lawyer, historian, and publicist

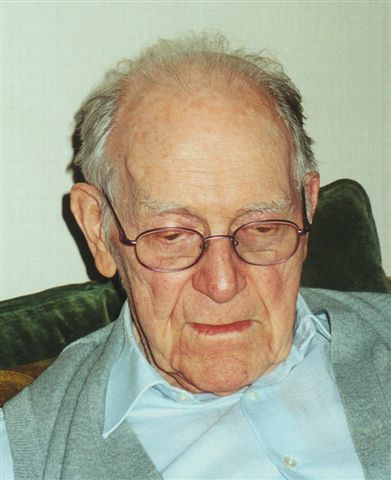
W. Żeleński, 12 August 2001, Paris

Władysław Żeleński (11 July 1903 – 25 June 2006) was a Polish lawyer, historian and publicist. He served in the Polish military during World War II, and afterwards lived in the France until his death in Paris in 2006.

Born in Parchacz, Władysław was a son of Izabella and Stanisław Gabriel Żeleński. He was a nephew of Tadeusz Boy-Żeleński, and a grandson of Władysław Żeleński, the composer.

Żeleński posited that the massacre of Lviv intellectuals was done because they had collaborated with the Soviets.
