= Aslanbek Sotiev =

Russian freestyle wrestler

Personal information
- Full name: Aslanbek Alanovich Sotiev
- National team: Russia
- Born: Асланбек Аланович Сотиев; 29 September 1999 (age 26)
- Weight: 97 kg (214 lb)

Sport
- Country: Russia
- Sport: Amateur wrestling
- Event: Freestyle
Medal record
Men's freestyle wrestling
Representing Russia
U23 World Championships
Silver medal – second place	2018 Bucharest	92 kg
Russian National Championships
Gold medal – first place	2022 Kyzyl	97 kg
Silver medal – second place	2021 Ulan-Ude	97 kg
Silver medal – second place	2020 Naro-Fominsk	97 kg
U23 European Championships
Gold medal – first place	2021 Skopje	97 kg

Aslanbek Alanovich Sotiev (born 29 September 1999) is a Russian freestyle wrestler who currently competes at 97 kilograms and represents North Ossetia–Alania in the national circuit. Sotiev is the reigning U23 European Continental champion and was a silver medalist at the 2018 U23 World Championships as well as the Russian National Championships (2020 and 2021).

== Major results ==
Year	Competition	Venue	Position	Event	Notes
Representing Russia
2018	U23 World Championships	Bucharest, Romania	2nd	Freestyle 92 kg	
2020	Russian National Championships	Naro-Fominsk, Russia	2nd	Freestyle 97 kg	
2021	Russian National Championships	Ulan–Ude, Russia	2nd	Freestyle 97 kg	
2021	U23 European Championships	Skopje, North Macedonia	1st	Freestyle 97 kg	
