= Franciszek Salezy Potocki =

Polish nobleman, diplomat, politician and knight

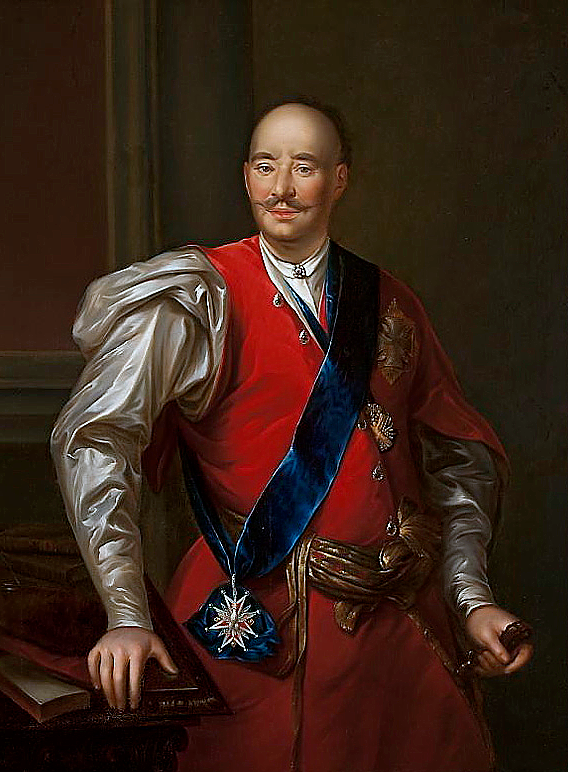
- Coat of arms: Pilawa
- Born: 1700; Krystynopol
- Died: 22 October 1772 (aged 71–72); Krystynopol
- Family: Potocki
- Consort: Zofia Rzeczycka; Anna Elżbieta Potocka
- Issue: with Zofia Rzeczycka; Ludwik Potocki with Anna Elżbieta Potocka; Adelajda Antonina Potocka; Pelagia Teresa Potocka; Ludwika Pelagia Potocka; Maria Klementyna Potocka; Stanisław Szczęsny Potocki
- Father: Józef Potocki
- Mother: Teofila Teresa Cetner

Franciszek Salezy Potocki (1700 – 22 October 1772) was a Polish nobleman, diplomat, politician and knight of the Order of the White Eagle, awarded on 3 August 1750, in Warsaw. Potocki was the wealthiest magnate of his time and the owner of large properties in Dnieper Ukraine, then part of the Polish Crown. Nicknamed "Little King of Ruthenia" ("królik Rusi").

Franciszek became Krajczy of the Crown in 1736, Field Clerk of the Crown and voivode of Volhynian Voivodship in 1755, voivode of Kijów Voivodship in 1755–1771 and starost of Belz, Hrubieszów, Ropczyce, Sokal, Jabłonów and Opalin.

== Bibliography ==
- Urzędnicy województwa bełskiego i ziemi chełmskiej XIV-XVIII wieku. Spisy. Oprac. Henryk Gmiterek i Ryszard Szczygieł. Kórnik 1992, p. 255.
- Teka Gabriela Junoszy Podoskiego, t. III, Poznań 1856, p. 303.
- Konfederacja Generalna Stanów Koronnych y Wielkiego Xięztwa Litewskiego na walnym zieźdźie w Dźikowie pod Sandomierzem postanowiona dnia V miesiąca Listopada. Roku Pańskiego MDCC.XXXIV, brak paginacji.
- Teka Gabriela Junoszy Podoskiego, t. IV, Poznań 1856, p. 472.
- Teka Gabriela Junoszy Podoskiego, t. IV, Poznań 1856, p. 710.
- Materiały do dziejów bezkrólewia po śmierci Augusta III i pierwszych lat dziesięciu panowania Stanisława Augusta Poniatowskiego, t. I Lwów 1857, pp. 45–49.
- Elektorów poczet, którzy niegdyś głosowali na elektorów Jana Kazimierza roku 1648, Jana III. roku 1674, Augusta II. roku 1697, i Stanisława Augusta roku 1764, najjaśniejszych Królów Polskich, Wielkich Książąt Litewskich, i.t.d. / ułożył i wydał Oswald Zaprzaniec z Siemuszowej Pietruski, Lwów 1845, p. 284.
- Volumina Legum t. VII, Petersburg 1860, pp. 244–248.
