= Sheptytskyi =

Sheptytskyi Шептицький
- City

- Flag Coat of arms
- Interactive map of Sheptytskyi
- Location of Sheptytskyi in Ukraine Sheptytskyi (Ukraine)
- Coordinates: 50°23′12″N 24°13′44″E
- Country: Ukraine
- Oblast: Lviv Oblast
- Raion: Sheptytskyi Raion
- Hromada: Sheptytskyi urban hromada
- Founded: c. 1692

Government
  - Mayor: Andriy Zalivsky

Area
  - Total: 37.6 km^{2} (14.5 sq mi)
- Elevation: 150 m (490 ft)

Population (2022)
  - Total: 64,297
  - Density: 1,710/km^{2} (4,430/sq mi)
- Time zone: UTC+2 (EET)
  - Summer (DST): UTC+3 (EEST)
- Sister cities: Békéscsaba

Sheptytskyi (Ukrainian: Шептицький, IPA: [ʃepˈtɪtsʲkɪj]), formerly Chervonohrad (Ukrainian: Червоноград, pronounced [tʃerwonoˈɦrɑd]), historically Krystynopol, is a historical mining town and the administrative center of Sheptytskyi Raion, Lviv Oblast of western Ukraine. It hosts the administration of Sheptytskyi urban hromada, one of the hromadas of Ukraine. Sheptytskyi lies about 62 km north of Lviv, 7 km from Sokal, 28 km northeast of the town of Voroniv, and has a population of 64,297 (2022 estimate).

== History ==
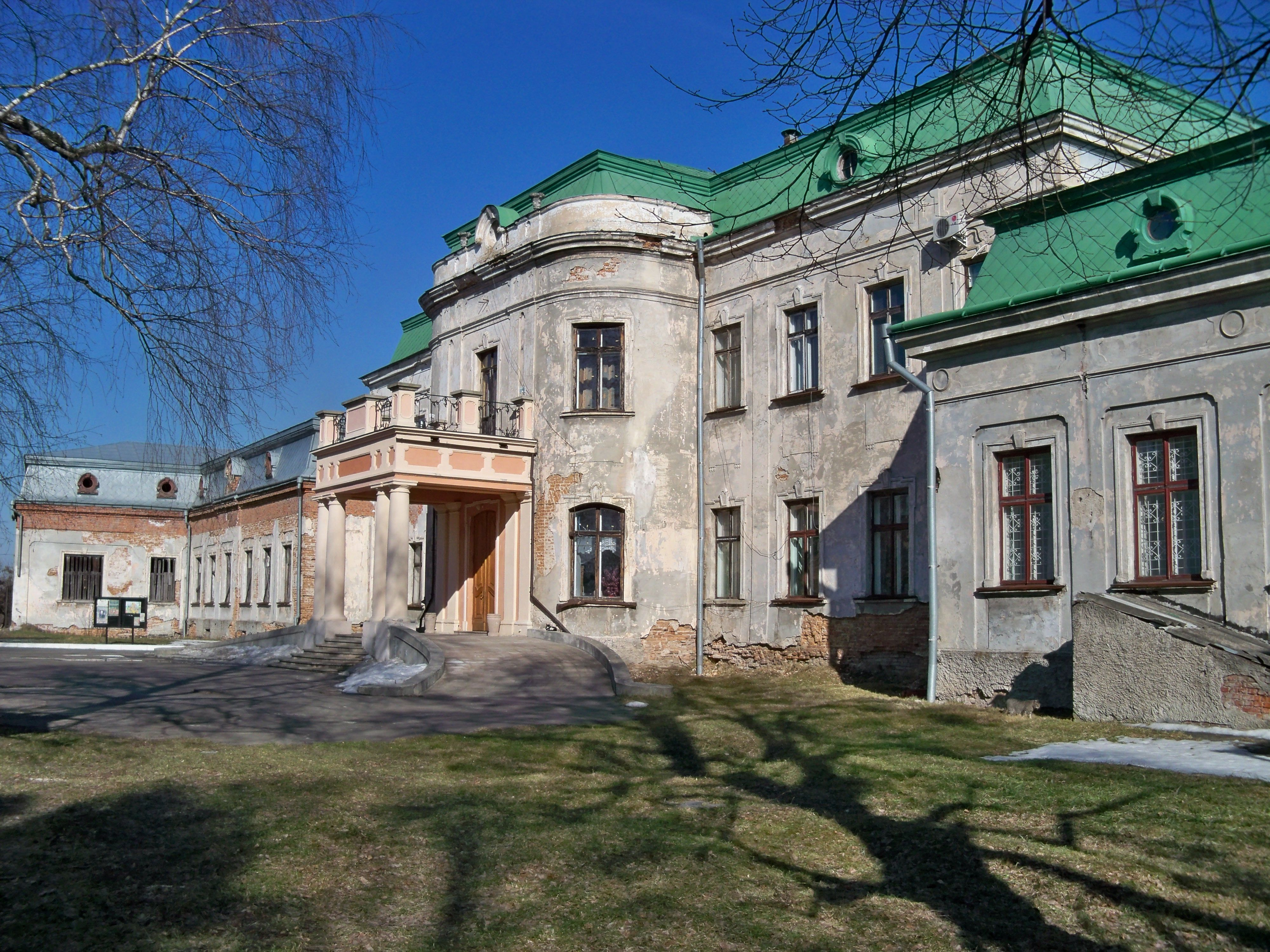
Potocki Palace

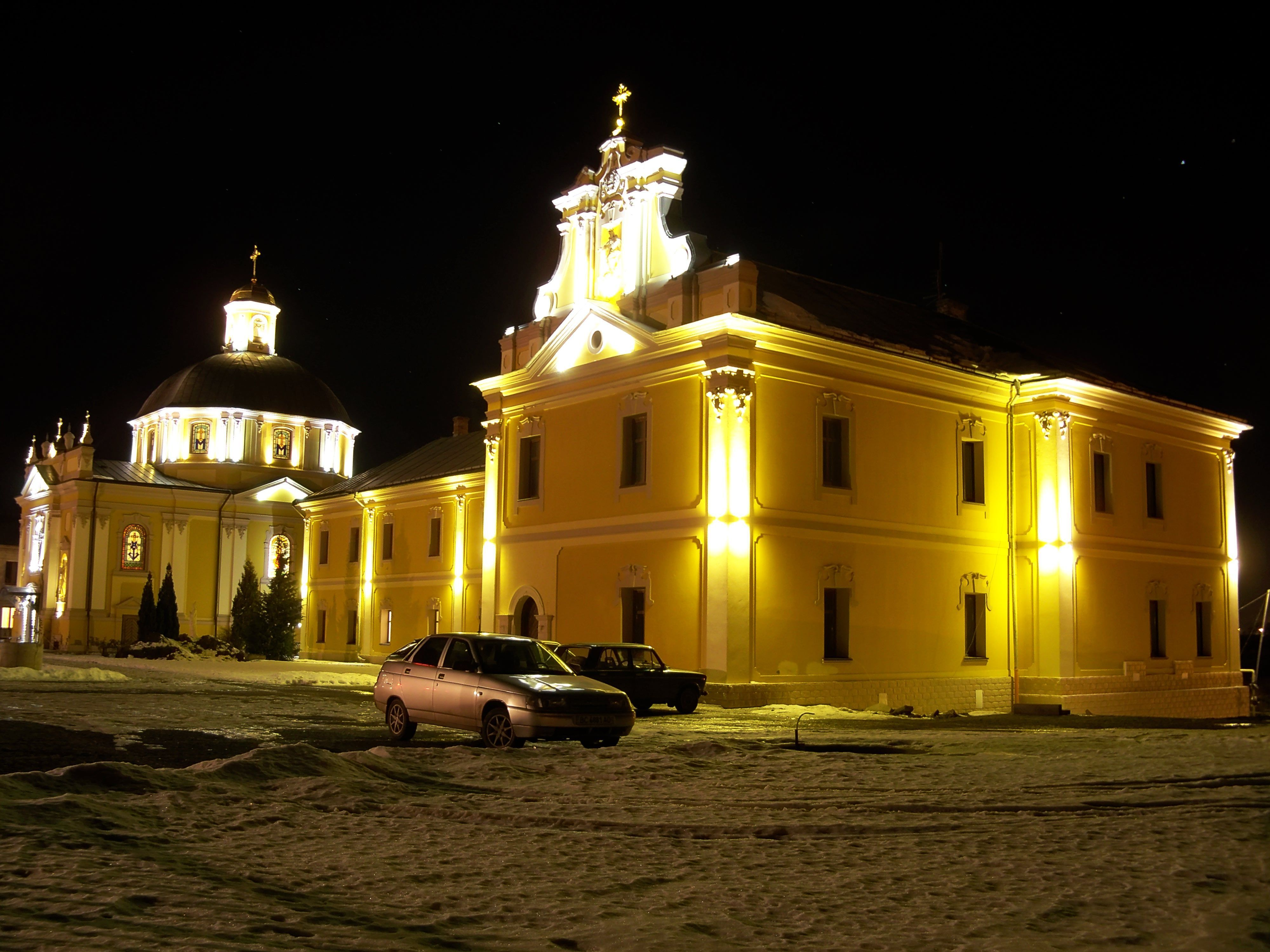
Basilian Monastery

In May 1685, the Crown hetman and Kraków Voivode Feliks Kazimierz Potocki purchased land along the Bug River. In 1692, he founded a city on the lands of the village Novyi Dvir (lit. 'New Courtyard', Polish: Nowy Dwór) and named it "Krystynopol" after his wife Krystyna Lubomirska (the suffix "-pol" derives from Greek "polis"). Potocki made the city his family center. He died here on 22 September 1702. His grandson Franciszek Salezy Potocki built a palace and in 1763 founded a Krystopil monastery of Basilians (barocco church of Saint George; prior to 1946 – a place of miracles with wondrous icon of the Mother of God). Among the landmarks of the city is Count Potocki's palace, constructed by the order of Feliks Kazimierz Potocki after 1692. The city, as Krystynopol, was part of the Polish Kingdom in the Polish–Lithuanian Commonwealth until 1772, when it was incorporated into the Habsburg Empire.

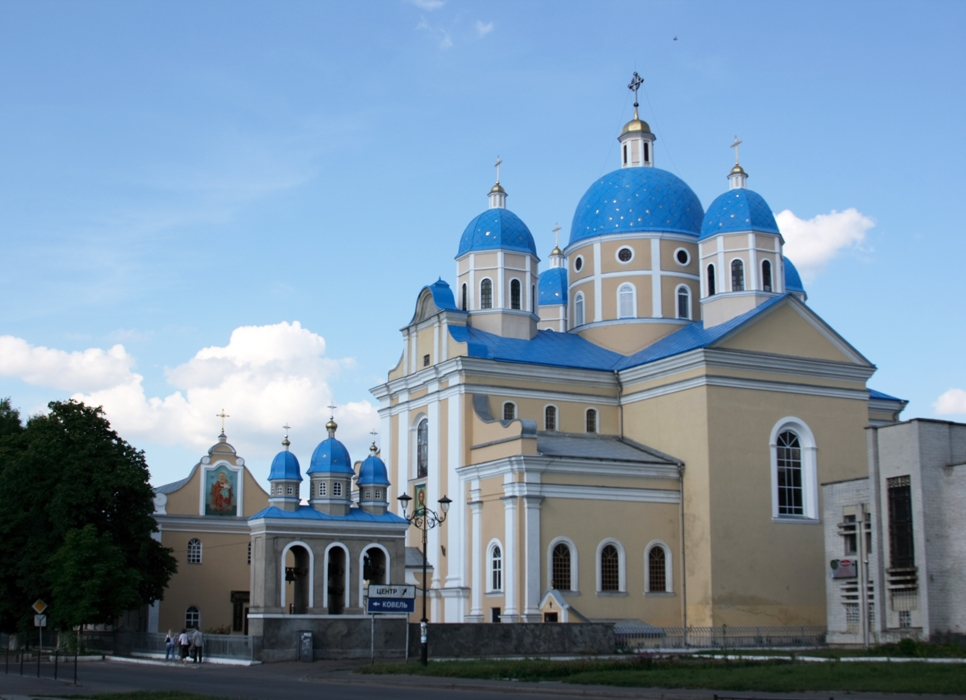
The Church of the Holy Spirit (built in the 1750s)

In the 19th century, the Apostolus Christinopolitanus and the chronicle from 1763 to 1779 were kept in the city. The Catholic order of Myrrh-Bearing Sisters was founded by Fr. Yulian Datsii in 1910, with the purpose of gathering funds to build a home for orphans and the poor. The first members of the congregation vowed to build two buildings: one for the people and one for the congregation. In 1913, the first convent arose, where 15 sisters lived. During World War II, the town was occupied by Nazi Germany from 1939 to 1944.

After World War II ended, the town was initially given back to Poland by the Soviet Union.

During the interwar period, it belonged to the Second Polish Republic, and between 1945 and 1951 was part of the Polish People's Republic. It passed from Poland to the Ukrainian SSR of the Soviet Union after the territorial exchange in 1951 and had its name changed from Krystynopil (Кристинопіль) to Chervonohrad, after the color red (Ukrainian: червоний, romanized: chervonyi).

A local newspaper is published in the city since June 1962. On 1 August 1990, Chervonohrad became the first city in the Soviet Union where a monument to Vladimir Lenin was removed.

Until 18 July 2020, Chervonohrad was designated as a city of oblast significance and belonged to Chervonohrad Municipality. As part of the administrative reform of Ukraine, which reduced the number of raions of Lviv Oblast to seven, Chervonohrad Municipality was merged into newly established Chervonohrad Raion. Before being abolished, Chervonohrad Municipality also included the city of Sosnivka (until 2019) and the urban type settlement of Hirnyk.

In August 2023, Ukrainian Institute of National Memory decided that the name of the city did not meet the law "On the Condemnation and Prohibition of Propaganda of Russian Imperial Policy in Ukraine and the Decolonization of Toponymy", meaning that Chervonohrad will be renamed. On 20 March 2024, the Committee of the Verkhovna Rada on issues of organization of state power, local self-government, regional development and urban planning decided to propose the name Sheptytskyi, in the name of Andrey Sheptytsky, a metropolitan archbishop who taught in the local monastery.

On 19 September 2024, the Verkhovna Rada voted to rename Chervonohrad to Sheptytskyi.

== Krystynopol Jews ==
Presently, there are 11–100 Jews residing in Sheptytskyi. The earliest known Jewish community dates back to 1740. In 1931 the Jewish population was 2,200. The Jewish cemetery dates from 18th century with the last known Hasidic burial in 1941. Krystynopol Jews were deported to the Belzec extermination camp in September, 1942. The Jewish surname and rabbinical family Kristinopoler / Kristianpoller stem from the city's former name, Krystynopol. Jewish immigrants to America from this city founded the Krystenopoler Synagogue and First Krystenopoler Sick Benevolent Association Brith Isaac in New York. The Jewish cemetery is located in the town center, in Shevska Street.

== Economics ==
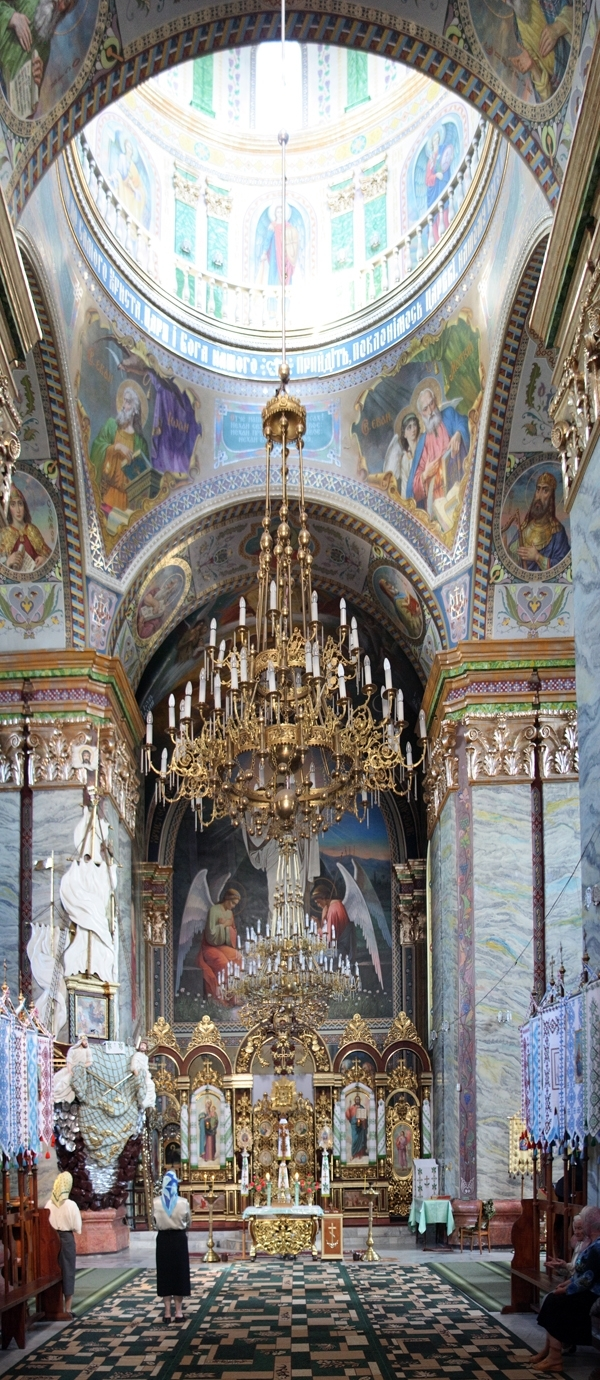
The interior of St. Volodymyr Church (built in the 1770s).

Since 1951 the city became the center of a newly emerged coal mining basin. Other enterprises, besides the mining works, include:

- Ferroconcrete Foundry
- Wood Processing Plant
- Tailoring Factory
- Stockings Factory
- Mines
- Dairy

=== Sheptytskyi Coal Mines ===
Sheptytskyi was started as a coal mining town. Currently, there are still many functional coal mines on the outskirts around the city:

- Chervonohradska
- Velykomostivska
- Mezhyrichanska
- Nadiia
- Stepova
- Lisova
- Vidrodzhennia
- Zarichna
- Vizeiska

== Education ==
- Branch of Lviv National Polytechnic University
- Mining College

== Population ==
The population of Sheptytskyi has increased significantly since 1939.

- 1939 — 3,000
- 1959 — 19,000
- 1970 — 54,000
- 1974 — 61,000
- 1981 — 78,000
- 1989 — 89,000
- 2001 — 85,500
- 2005 — 83,400
- 2010 — 82,900
- 2025 — 56,790 (6312 displaced persons)

=== Ethnic groups ===
2001 census
	percent
Ukrainians	92.31%
Russians	6.44%
Belarusians	0.55%
Poles	0.19%
Germans	0.09%
Tatars	0.06%
Moldovans	0.04%
Armenians	0.04%

== Notable people ==
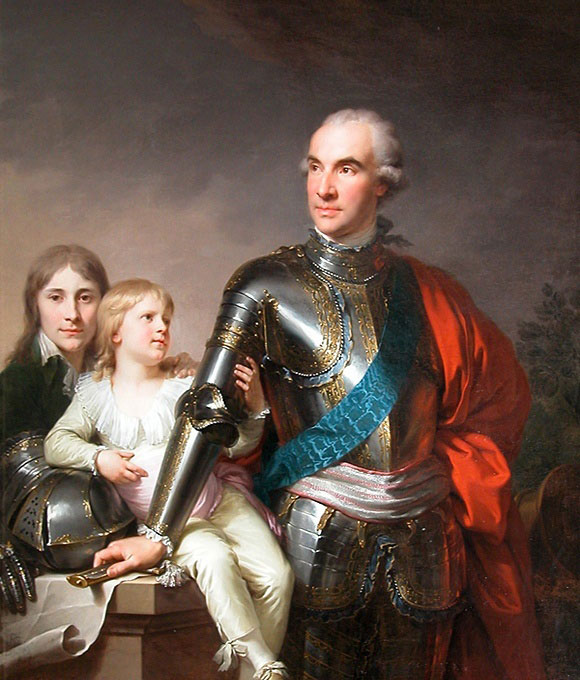
Painting of Stanisław Szczęsny Potocki from 1790

- Janina Hurynowicz (1894–1967), a Polish doctor, neurophysiologist and neurologist.
- MamaRika (born 1989), a Ukrainian singer and actress.
- Franciszek Salezy Potocki (1700–1772), a Polish nobleman, diplomat and politician.
- Stanisław Szczęsny Potocki (1751–1805), a member of the Polish nobility and a military commander.
- Frank Taffel (1877–1947), a journalist, a founder of the Congregation Beth Jacob (Atlanta)
- Volodymyr Tykhyi (born 1970), a Ukrainian film director, screenwriter and film producer of documentaries and feature films.

=== Sport ===
- Volodymyr Dykyi (1962–2021), a Soviet and Ukrainian footballer with over 500 club caps
- Roman Hnativ (born 1973), a former Soviet and Ukrainian footballer with 354 club caps
- Tetyana Klimchenko (born 1994), a Ukrainian professional racing cyclist
- Nazar Kulchytskyy (born 1992), a Ukrainian-American retired freestyle and folkstyle wrestler
- Mykola Morozyuk (born 1988), a Ukrainian footballer with over 330 club caps

== Postal codes ==
80100-80110
