= 2021 European U23 Wrestling Championships =

- Host city: Skopje, North Macedonia
- Dates: May 17–23, 2021

Champions
- Freestyle: Russia
- Greco-Roman: Russia
- Women: Ukraine

The 2021 European U23 Wrestling Championships was the 6th edition of European U23 Wrestling Championships of combined events, and took place from May 17 to 23 in Skopje, North Macedonia.

== Medal table ==
* Host nation (North Macedonia)

Rank	Nation	Gold	Silver	Bronze	Total
1	Russia	13	6	7	26
2	Ukraine	5	3	5	13
3	Turkey	3	4	8	15
4	Armenia	2	3	5	10
5	Azerbaijan	2	3	4	9
6	Moldova	2	2	1	5
7	Georgia	1	2	3	6
8	Hungary	1	2	2	5
9	Poland	1	1	5	7
10	Belarus	0	2	7	9
11	Sweden	0	2	0	2
12	Bulgaria	0	0	2	2
12	Germany	0	0	2	2
12	Greece	0	0	2	2
12	Italy	0	0	2	2
16	Albania	0	0	1	1
16	Austria	0	0	1	1
16	Norway	0	0	1	1
16	Romania	0	0	1	1
Totals (19 entries)		30	30	59	119

== Team ranking ==
Rank	Men's freestyle		Men's Greco-Roman		Women's freestyle	
Rank	Team	Points	Team	Points	Team	Points
1	Russia	196	Russia	203	Ukraine	183
2	Turkey	150	Armenia	123	Russia	167
3	Azerbaijan	140	Turkey	106	Poland	128
4	Georgia	103	Georgia	102	Turkey	116
5	Ukraine	99	Hungary	89	Belarus	112

== Medal summary ==
=== Men's freestyle ===
Event	Gold	Silver	Bronze
57 kg	(Russia) Akhmed Idrisov	(Azerbaijan) Aliabbas Rzazade	(Italy) Simone Vincenzo Piroddu
57 kg	(Russia) Akhmed Idrisov	(Azerbaijan) Aliabbas Rzazade	(Georgia (country)) Ramaz Turmanidze
61 kg	(Georgia (country)) Teimuraz Vanishvili	(Armenia) Razmik Papikyan	(Bulgaria) Ruhan Hyusnyu Rasim
61 kg	(Georgia (country)) Teimuraz Vanishvili	(Armenia) Razmik Papikyan	(Turkey) Emrah Ormanoğlu
65 kg	(Ukraine) Erik Arushanian	(Russia) Abdulmazhid Kudiev	(Turkey) Cavit Acar
65 kg	(Ukraine) Erik Arushanian	(Russia) Abdulmazhid Kudiev	(Azerbaijan) Ziraddin Bayramov
70 kg	(Azerbaijan) Dzhabrail Gadzhiev	(Moldova) Nicolai Grahmez	(Armenia) Arman Andreasyan
70 kg	(Azerbaijan) Dzhabrail Gadzhiev	(Moldova) Nicolai Grahmez	(Russia) Inalbek Sheriev
74 kg	(Russia) Chermen Valiev	(Armenia) Hrayr Alikhanyan	(Georgia (country)) Vladimeri Gamkrelidze
74 kg	(Russia) Chermen Valiev	(Armenia) Hrayr Alikhanyan	(Greece) Georgios Kougioumtsidis
79 kg	(Turkey) Ramazan Sarı	(Russia) Khalid Iakhiev	(Ukraine) Valentyn Babii
79 kg	(Turkey) Ramazan Sarı	(Russia) Khalid Iakhiev	(Armenia) Arman Avagyan
86 kg	(Russia) Amanula Rasulov	(Azerbaijan) Orkhan Abasov	(Ukraine) Denys Sahalıuk
86 kg	(Russia) Amanula Rasulov	(Azerbaijan) Orkhan Abasov	(Turkey) Emre Çiftçi
92 kg	(Turkey) Erhan Yaylacı	(Azerbaijan) Osman Nurmagomedov	(Moldova) Gheorghe Erhan
92 kg	(Turkey) Erhan Yaylacı	(Azerbaijan) Osman Nurmagomedov	(Russia) Azamat Zakuev
97 kg	(Russia) Aslanbek Sotiev	(Moldova) Radu Lefter	(Azerbaijan) Islam Ilyasov
97 kg	(Russia) Aslanbek Sotiev	(Moldova) Radu Lefter	(Belarus) Aliaksei Parkhomenka
125 kg	(Turkey) Anıl Kılıçsallayan	(Russia) Atsamaz Tebloev	(Azerbaijan) Vakhit Galayev
125 kg	(Turkey) Anıl Kılıçsallayan	(Russia) Atsamaz Tebloev	(Belarus) Yaraslau Slavikouski

=== Men's Greco-Roman ===
Event	Gold	Silver	Bronze
55 kg	(Azerbaijan) Zaur Aliyev	(Turkey) Adem Uzun	(Albania) Bajram Sina
55 kg	(Azerbaijan) Zaur Aliyev	(Turkey) Adem Uzun	(Russia) Mavlud Rizmanov
60 kg	(Russia) Anvar Allakhiarov	(Ukraine) Ihor Kurochkin	(Belarus) Uladzislau Prybylski
60 kg	(Russia) Anvar Allakhiarov	(Ukraine) Ihor Kurochkin	(Armenia) Tigran Minasyan
63 kg	(Armenia) Hrachya Poghosyan	(Sweden) Niklas Oehlen	(Russia) Rakhman Tavmurzaev
63 kg	(Armenia) Hrachya Poghosyan	(Sweden) Niklas Oehlen	(Belarus) Aliaksandr Pechurenka
67 kg	(Hungary) Krisztian Vancza	(Turkey) Kadir Kamal	(Bulgaria) Ivo Krasimirov Iliev
67 kg	(Hungary) Krisztian Vancza	(Turkey) Kadir Kamal	(Azerbaijan) Hasrat Jafarov
72 kg	(Armenia) Malkhas Amoyan	(Ukraine) Andrii Kulyk	(Russia) Sergey Kutuzov
72 kg	(Armenia) Malkhas Amoyan	(Ukraine) Andrii Kulyk	(Germany) Idris Ibaev
77 kg	(Russia) Sergei Stepanov	(Sweden) Per Albin Olofsson	(Turkey) Erkan Ergen
77 kg	(Russia) Sergei Stepanov	(Sweden) Per Albin Olofsson	(Armenia) Samvel Grigoryan
82 kg	(Russia) Shamil Ozhaev	(Hungary) Tamas Levai	(Belarus) Yauheni Yurou
82 kg	(Russia) Shamil Ozhaev	(Hungary) Tamas Levai	(Georgia (country)) Aivengo Rikadze
87 kg	(Russia) Aleksandr Komarov	(Georgia (country)) Temuri Tchkuaselidze	(Hungary) Istvan Takacs
87 kg	(Russia) Aleksandr Komarov	(Georgia (country)) Temuri Tchkuaselidze	(Armenia) Gevorg Tadevosyan
97 kg	(Russia) Artur Sargsian	(Georgia (country)) Giorgi Katsanashvili	(Austria) Markus Ragginger
97 kg	(Russia) Artur Sargsian	(Georgia (country)) Giorgi Katsanashvili	(Greece) Michail Iosifidis
130 kg	(Russia) Mikhail Laptev	(Armenia) David Ovasapyan	(Turkey) Fatih Bozkurt
130 kg	(Russia) Mikhail Laptev	(Armenia) David Ovasapyan	(Hungary) Dariusz Attila Vitek

=== Women's freestyle ===
Event	Gold	Silver	Bronze
50 kg	(Russia) Maria Tyumerekova	(Belarus) Anastasiya Yanotava	(Turkey) Aynur Erge
50 kg	(Russia) Maria Tyumerekova	(Belarus) Anastasiya Yanotava	(Ukraine) Liliia Malanchuk
53 kg	(Russia) Ekaterina Verbina	(Turkey) Zeynep Yetgil	(Poland) Alicja Czyzowicz
53 kg	(Russia) Ekaterina Verbina	(Turkey) Zeynep Yetgil	(Ukraine) Mariia Vynnyk
55 kg	(Ukraine) Khrystyna Demko	(Russia) Aleksandra Skirenko	(Poland) Dominika Kulwicka
55 kg	(Ukraine) Khrystyna Demko	(Russia) Aleksandra Skirenko	(Turkey) Esra Pul
57 kg	(Ukraine) Alina Akobiia	(Poland) Patrycja Gil	(Russia) Viktoriia Vaulina
57 kg	(Ukraine) Alina Akobiia	(Poland) Patrycja Gil	(Norway) Othelie Høie
59 kg	(Moldova) Anastasia Nichita	(Hungary) Tamara Dollak	(Ukraine) Solomiia Vynnyk
59 kg	(Moldova) Anastasia Nichita	(Hungary) Tamara Dollak	(Belarus) Krystsina Sazyakina
62 kg	(Ukraine) Tetiana Rizhko	(Belarus) Tatsiana Paulava	(Poland) Anhelina Lysak
62 kg	(Ukraine) Tetiana Rizhko	(Belarus) Tatsiana Paulava	(Russia) Mariia Lachugina
65 kg	(Moldova) Irina Rîngaci	(Ukraine) Kateryna Zelenykh	(Germany) Eyleen Sewina
65 kg	(Moldova) Irina Rîngaci	(Ukraine) Kateryna Zelenykh	(Poland) Kamila Kulwicka
68 kg	(Ukraine) Oksana Chudyk	(Russia) Vusala Parfianovich	(Turkey) Nesrin Baş
68 kg	(Ukraine) Oksana Chudyk	(Russia) Vusala Parfianovich	(Poland) Ewelina Ciunek
72 kg	(Poland) Wiktoria Choluj	(Russia) Marina Surovtseva	(Belarus) Anastasiya Zimiankova
72 kg	(Poland) Wiktoria Choluj	(Russia) Marina Surovtseva	None awarded
76 kg	(Russia) Evgeniia Zakharchenko	(Turkey) Ayşegül Özbege	(Italy) Enrica Rinaldi
76 kg	(Russia) Evgeniia Zakharchenko	(Turkey) Ayşegül Özbege	(Romania) Diana Vlasceanu
