= Solokiia =

Solokiia Sołokija
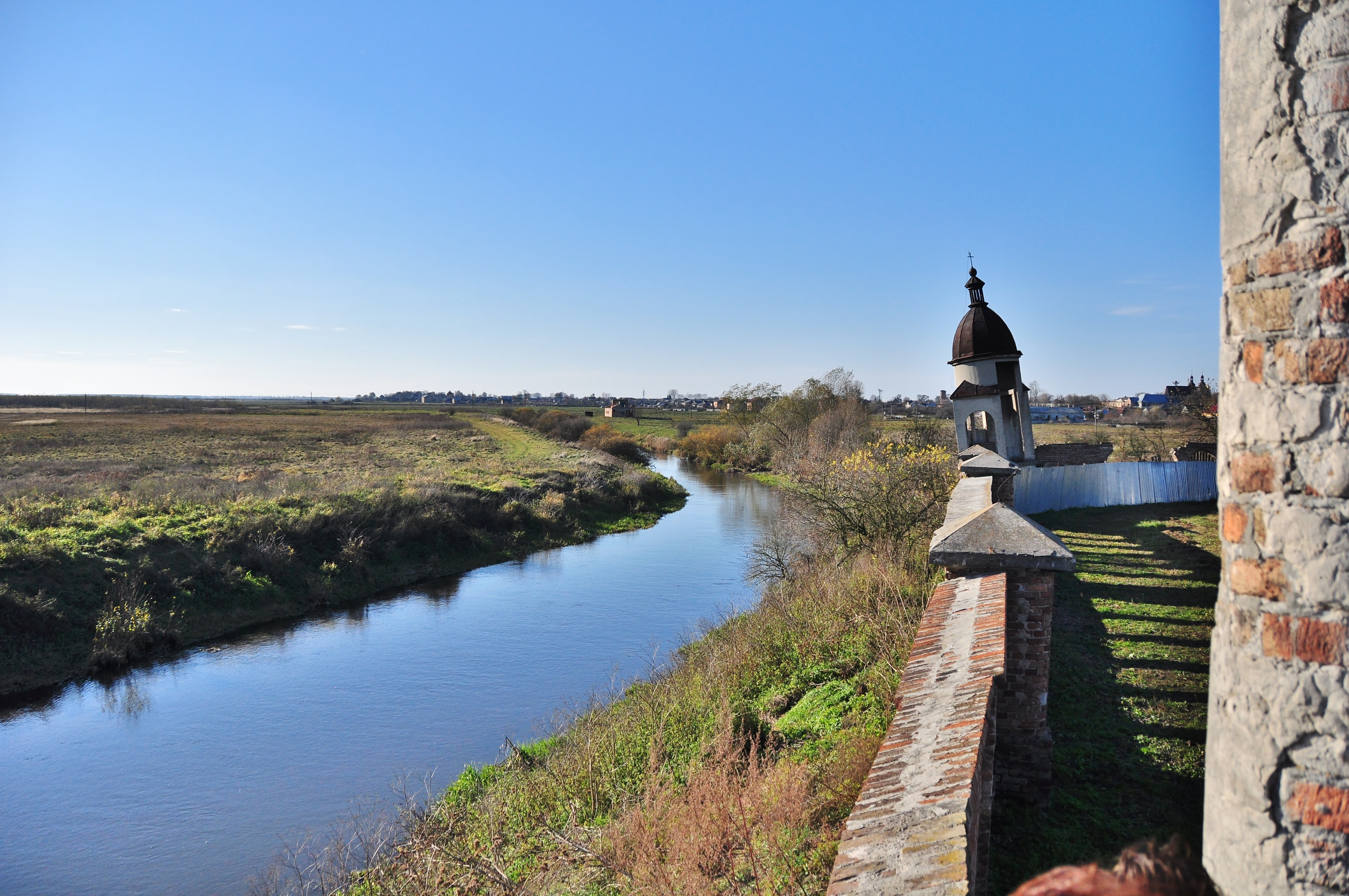
- Solokiia in Belz

Location
- Country: Poland, Ukraine

Physical characteristics
- Source
  - location: North-Eastern slopes of Roztocze, Poland
- Mouth
  - location: Bug
  - coordinates: 50.3767°N 24.2417°E
- Length: 88 km (55 mi)
- Basin size: 939 km^{2} (363 sq mi)

Basin features
- Progression: Bug→ Narew→ Vistula→ Baltic Sea

The Solokiia (Ukrainian: Солокія; Polish: Sołokija) is a river in Poland and Ukraine and a tributary of the Bug. Its source is located north of Tomaszów Lubelski. In its upper reaches, the Solokiia runs mainly in a southeastern direction. Near the crossing of the Polish-Ukrainian border it turns to the east and after passing through Uhniv and Belz it flows in Chervonohrad as a left affluent into the Western Bug.

After substantial coal deposits were discovered in its vicinity, part of the river basin was transferred from Poland to the USSR in the 1951 Polish–Soviet territorial exchange.
