= Solomiia Vynnyk =

Ukrainian freestyle wrestler

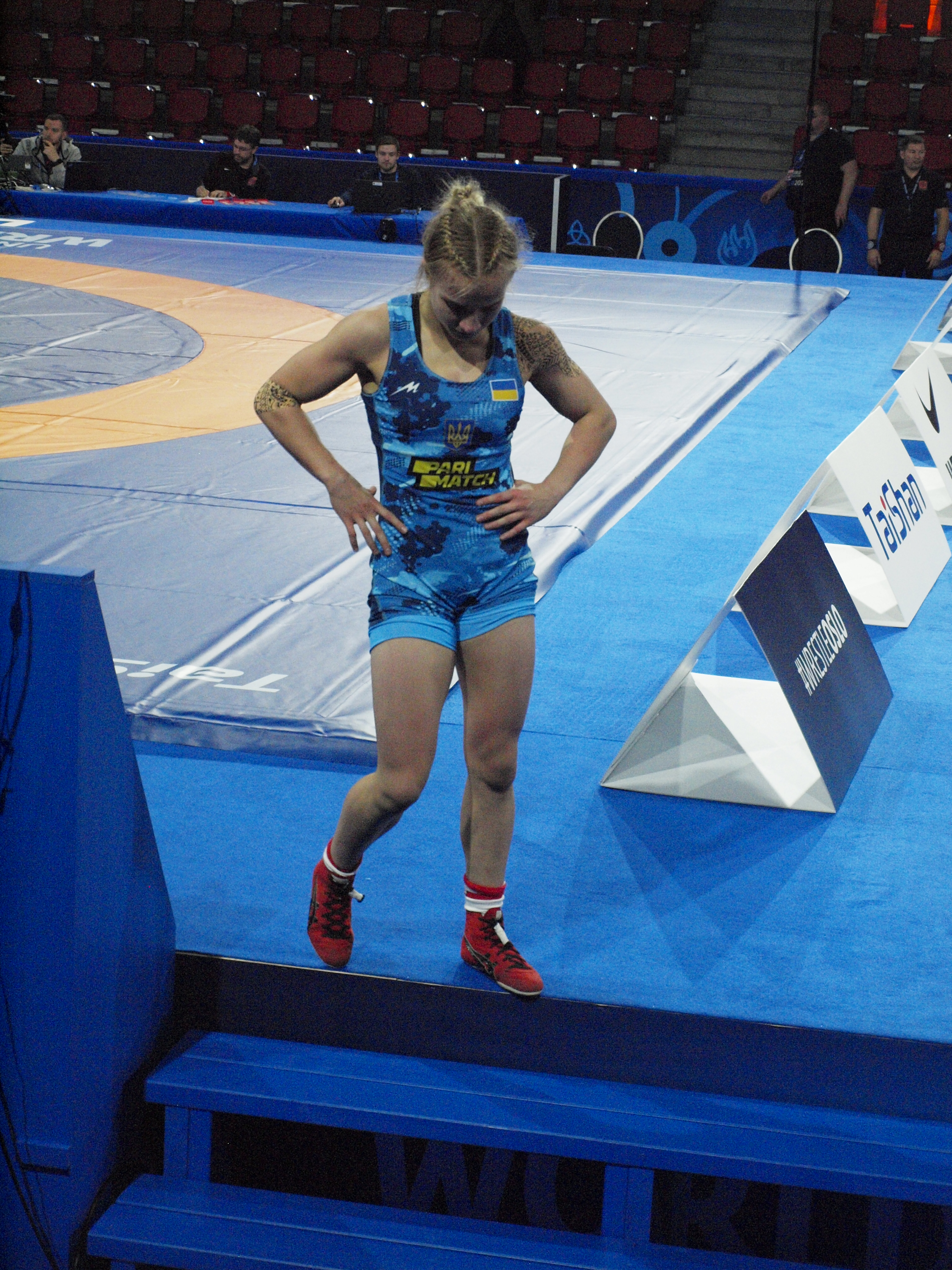
- Vynnyk at the 2021 World Wrestling Championships in Oslo, Norway

Personal information
- Born: 27 November 2001 (age 24)

Sport
- Country: Ukraine
- Sport: Amateur wrestling
- Weight class: 57 kg; 59 kg
- Event: Freestyle
Medal record
Women's freestyle wrestling
Representing Ukraine
European Championships
Silver medal – second place	2020 Rome	55 kg
Bronze medal – third place	2024 Bucharest	57 kg
Bronze medal – third place	2025 Bratislava	57 kg
World U23 Championships
Gold medal – first place	2023 Tirana	59 kg
Gold medal – first place	2024 Tirana	59 kg
Silver medal – second place	2021 Belgrade	59 kg
European U23 Championships
Gold medal – first place	2023 Bucharest	59 kg
Bronze medal – third place	2021 Skopje	59 kg
European Juniors Championships
Gold medal – first place	2021 Dortmund	57 kg

Solomiia Vynnyk (born 27 November 2001) is a Ukrainian freestyle wrestler. In 2020, at the European Wrestling Championships held in Rome, Italy, she won the silver medal in the women's 55 kg event. In the final, she lost against Olga Khoroshavtseva of Russia.

== Career ==
In 2019, Vynnyk competed in the women's freestyle event of the 2019 Wrestling World Cup.

Vynnyk won one of the bronze medals in her event at the 2021 European U23 Wrestling Championship held in Skopje, North Macedonia.

In October 2021, Vynnyk lost her bronze medal match in the women's 57 kg event at the World Wrestling Championships in Oslo, Norway. A month later, at the 2021 U23 World Wrestling Championships held in Belgrade, Serbia, she won the silver medal in the 59 kg event.

In 2022, Vynnyk competed in the 59 kg event at the European Wrestling Championships held in Budapest, Hungary. A few months later, she competed at the Matteo Pellicone Ranking Series 2022 held in Rome, Italy. She competed in the 59 kg event at the 2022 World Wrestling Championships held in Belgrade, Serbia where she was eliminated in her first match. A month later, she won one of the bronze medals in 59 kg event at the 2022 U23 World Wrestling Championships held in Pontevedra, Spain.

Vynnyk won the gold medal in her event at the 2023 European U23 Wrestling Championships held in Bucharest, Romania. She won one of the bronze medals in the 57 kg event at the 2024 European Wrestling Championships held in Bucharest, Romania. She defeated Elvira Kamaloğlu of Turkey in her bronze medal match.

== Achievements ==
Year	Tournament	Venue	Result	Event
2020	European Championships	Rome, Italy	2nd	Freestyle 55 kg
2024	European Championships	Bucharest, Romania	3rd	Freestyle 57 kg
2025	European Championships	Bratislava, Slovakia	3rd	Freestyle 57 kg
