= Sosnivka =

City in Lviv Oblast, Ukraine

Sosnivka Соснівка
- City
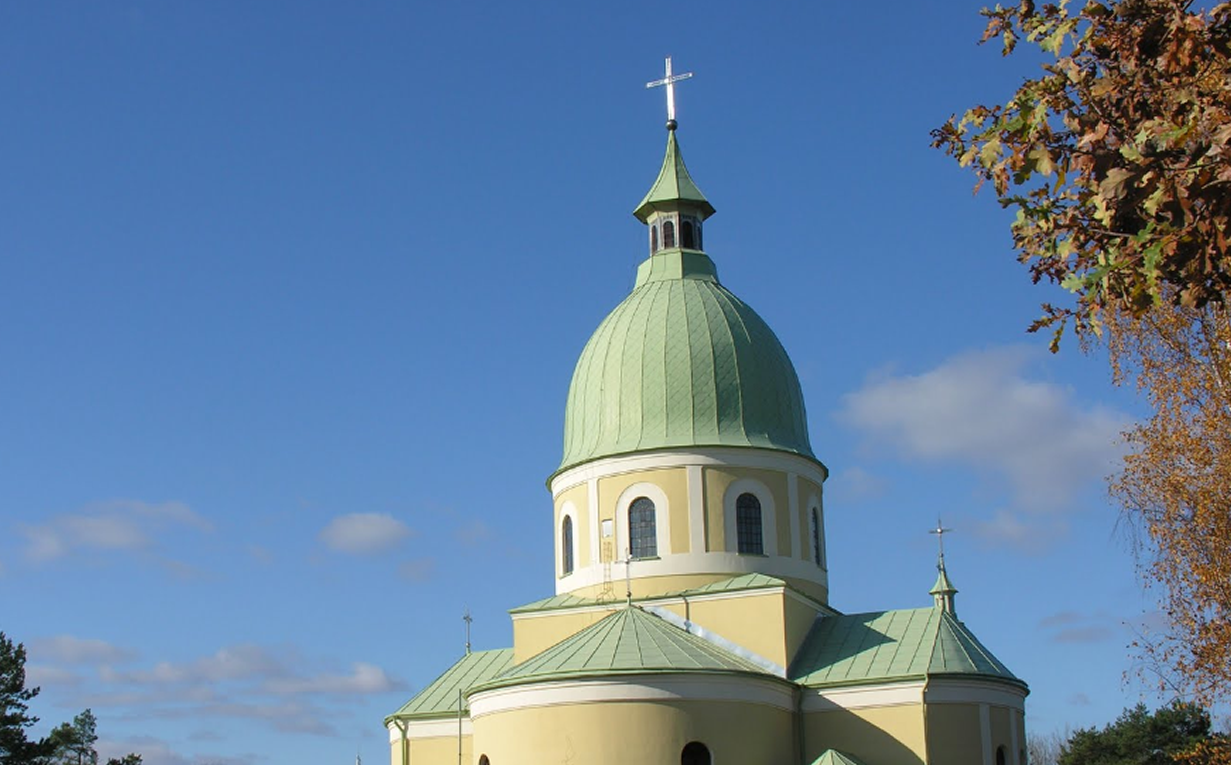
- Saints Peter and Paul Church

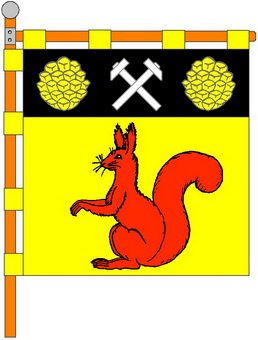
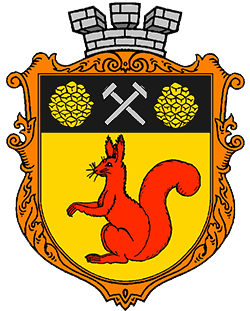
- Flag Coat of arms

- Location within Lviv Oblast Location within Ukraine
- Coordinates: 50°17′40″N 24°15′00″E
- Country: Ukraine
- Oblast: Lviv Oblast
- Raion: Sheptytskyi Raion
- Hromada: Sheptytskyi urban hromada
- First mentioned: 1955

Area
  - Total: 1.98 km^{2} (0.76 sq mi)

Population (2022)
  - Total: 10,712
  - Density: 5,410/km^{2} (14,000/sq mi)
- Time zone: UTC+2 (EET)
  - Summer (DST): UTC+3 (EEST)
- Postal code: 80193

Sosnivka (Ukrainian: Соснівка, IPA: [soˈs⁽ʲ⁾n⁽ʲ⁾iu̯kɐ]) is a city in Sheptytskyi Raion of Lviv Oblast (region) of Ukraine. It belongs to Sheptytskyi urban hromada, one of the hromadas of Ukraine. Population: 10,712 (2022 estimate).

Until June 2019, Sosnivka was administratively subordinated to the city of Sheptytskyi, and then transferred to Sokal Raion. The raion was abolished on 18 July 2020, as part of the administrative reform of Ukraine, which reduced the number of raions of Lviv Oblast to seven. The area of Sokal Raion was merged into Sheptytskyi Raion.

== Population ==
=== Language ===
Distribution of the population by native language according to the 2001 census:

Language	Number	Percentage
Ukrainian	10 996	92.89%
Russian	807	6.82%
Other or undecided	35	0.29%
Total	11 838	100.00%
