= Olga Khoroshavtseva =

Russian freestyle wrestler

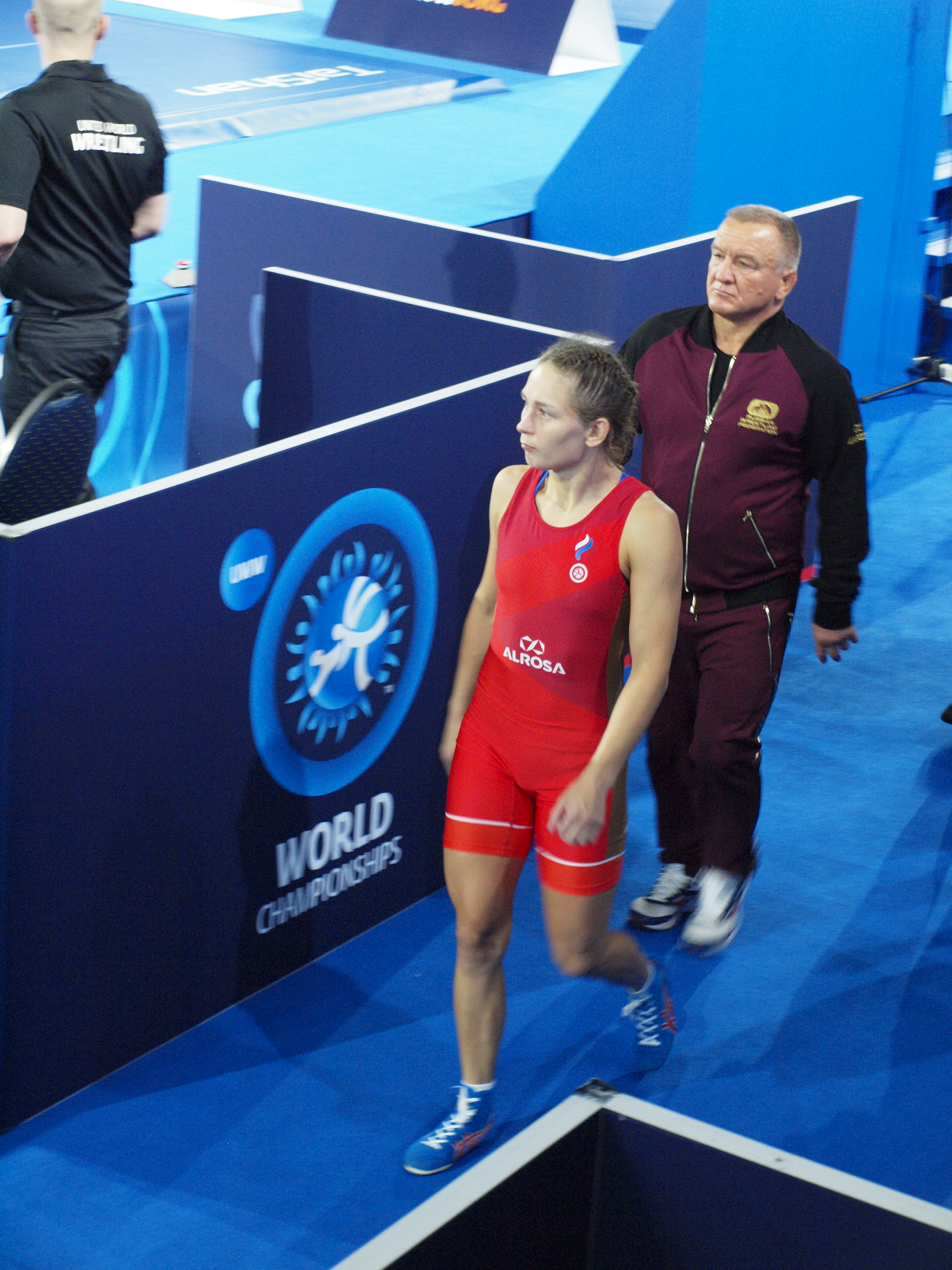
- Khoroshavtseva at the 2021 World Wrestling Championships in Oslo, Norway

Personal information
- Native name: Ольга Николаевна Хорошавцева
- Full name: Olga Nikolayevna Khoroshavtseva
- Nickname: Achinsk Express
- Nationality: (Russia) Russian
- Born: 24 August 1994 (age 31) Achinsk, Krasnoyarsk Krai, Russia
- Height: 158 cm (5 ft 2 in)
- Weight: 55 kg (121 lb)

Sport
- Country: Russia
- Sport: Amateur wrestling
- Event: Freestyle
- Club: Mindiashvili wrestling academy
- Coached by: Ivan Elgin, Alexander Suchkov (formerly)
Medal record
Women's freestyle wrestling
Representing United World Wrestling
World Championships
Bronze medal – third place	2025 Zagreb	57 kg
European Championships
Gold medal – first place	2025 Bratislava	57 kg
Representing Individual Neutral Athletes
Yasar Dogu Tournament
Gold medal – first place	2024 Antalya	57 kg
Grand Prix
Silver medal – second place	2025 Tirana	55 kg
Representing Russia
World Championships
Bronze medal – third place	2019 Nur-Sultan	55 kg
European Championships
Gold medal – first place	2020 Rome	55 kg
Gold medal – first place	2021 Warsaw	53 kg
Individual World Cup
Bronze medal – third place	2020 Belgrade	55 kg
Golden Grand Prix Ivan Yarygin
Gold medal – first place	2015 Krasnoyarsk	53 kg
Gold medal – first place	2020 Krasnoyarsk	55 kg
Silver medal – second place	2019 Krasnoyarsk	57 kg
Silver medal – second place	2022 Krasnoyarsk	57 kg
European U23 Championships
Bronze medal – third place	2015 Walbrzych	53 kg

Olga Nikolayevna Khoroshavtseva (Russian: Ольга Николаевна Хорошавцева; born 24 August 1994) is a Russian freestyle wrestler. She is a two-time gold medalist at the European Wrestling Championships. She also won a bronze medal in the women's 55 kg event at the 2019 World Wrestling Championships held in Nur-Sultan, Kazakhstan. She competed at the 2020 Summer Olympics in Tokyo, Japan.

== Career ==
In 2015, at the Golden Grand Prix Ivan Yarygin held in Krasnoyarsk, Russia, she won the gold medal in the women's 53 kg event. In 2018, Khoroshavtseva won the gold medal in the women's 57 kg event at the Russian National Women's Freestyle Wrestling Championships held in Smolensk, Russia. Later that year, she was eliminated in her first match, by Pooja Dhanda of India, in the women's 57 kg event at the 2018 World Wrestling Championships held in Budapest, Hungary.

At the Golden Grand Prix Ivan Yarygin 2019 held in Krasnoyarsk, Russia, she won the silver medal in the women's 57 kg event. A year later, at the Golden Grand Prix Ivan Yarygin 2020, she won the gold medal in the women's 55 kg event.

Khoroshavtseva also competed in the women's freestyle 57 kg event at the 2019 European Wrestling Championships held in Bucharest, Romania. At the 2020 European Wrestling Championships held in Rome, Italy, she won the gold medal in the women's 55 kg event. In the final, she defeated Solomiia Vynnyk of Ukraine. In 2020, she also won one of the bronze medals in the women's 55 kg event at the Individual Wrestling World Cup held in Belgrade, Serbia.

In 2021, Khoroshavtseva began competing in the 53 kg weight class and she repeated her previous success at the European Wrestling Championships with a second gold medal. She earned her medal by defeating Maria Prevolaraki of Greece in the women's 53 kg event at the 2021 European Wrestling Championships held in Warsaw, Poland. In May 2021, Khoroshavtseva qualified at the World Olympic Qualification Tournament in Sofia, Bulgaria to compete in the women's 53 kg event at the 2020 Summer Olympics. A month later, she won the gold medal in the women's 55 kg event at the 2021 Poland Open held in Warsaw, Poland.

At the 2020 Summer Olympics in Tokyo, Japan, Khoroshavtseva was eliminated in her first match in the women's 53 kg event by Jacarra Winchester of the United States. Two months after the Olympics, she lost her bronze medal match in the women's 55 kg event at the 2021 World Wrestling Championships held in Oslo, Norway.

In January 2022, Khoroshavtseva won the silver medal in the women's 57 kg event at the Golden Grand Prix Ivan Yarygin held in Krasnoyarsk, Russia. Khoroshavtseva was unable to compete in the final due to illness and forfeited the match to Helen Maroulis of the United States who won the gold medal. In February 2022, she competed in the women's 57 kg event at the Yasar Dogu Tournament held in Istanbul, Turkey.

In 2023, Khoroshavtseva won her event at the Russian National Freestyle Wrestling Championships held in Kaspiysk, Dagestan. She competed at the 2024 European Wrestling Olympic Qualification Tournament in Baku, Azerbaijan hoping to qualify for the 2024 Summer Olympics in Paris, France. She was eliminated in her second match and she did not qualify for the Olympics.

== Achievements ==
Year	Tournament	Location	Result	Event
2019	World Championships	Nur-Sultan, Kazakhstan	3rd	Freestyle 55 kg
2020	European Championships	Rome, Italy	1st	Freestyle 55 kg
2021	European Championships	Warsaw, Poland	1st	Freestyle 53 kg
2025	European Championships	Bratislava, Slovakia	1st	Freestyle 57 kg
2025	World Championships	Zagreb, Croatia	3rd	Freestyle 57 kg
