= Tamara Dollák =

Hungarian freestyle wrestler (born 1999)

Personal information
- Born: Hungary

Sport
- Country: Hungary
- Sport: Women's freestyle wrestling
- Weight class: 57 kg
- Club: Ujpesti Torna Egylet
- Coached by: Martin Gabor
Medal record
Women's freestyle wrestling
Representing Hungary
European Championships
Bronze medal – third place	2022 Budapest	57 kg
World Military Championships
Bronze medal – third place	2025 Warendorf	57 kg
University World Cup
Silver medal – second place	2022 Samsun	55 kg
Dan Kolov & Nikola Petrov Tournament
Gold medal – first place	2021 Plovdiv	59 kg
U23 European Championships
Silver medal – second place	2021 Skopje	59 kg
Bronze medal – third place	2022 Plovdiv	57 kg
Junior European Championships
Bronze medal – third place	2019 Pontevedra	57 kg

Tamara Dollák is a Hungarian freestyle wrestler She competed at the 2022 European Wrestling Championships, winning the bronze medal in the 57 kg event.
