= Zhala Aliyeva =

Azerbaijani freestyle wrestler

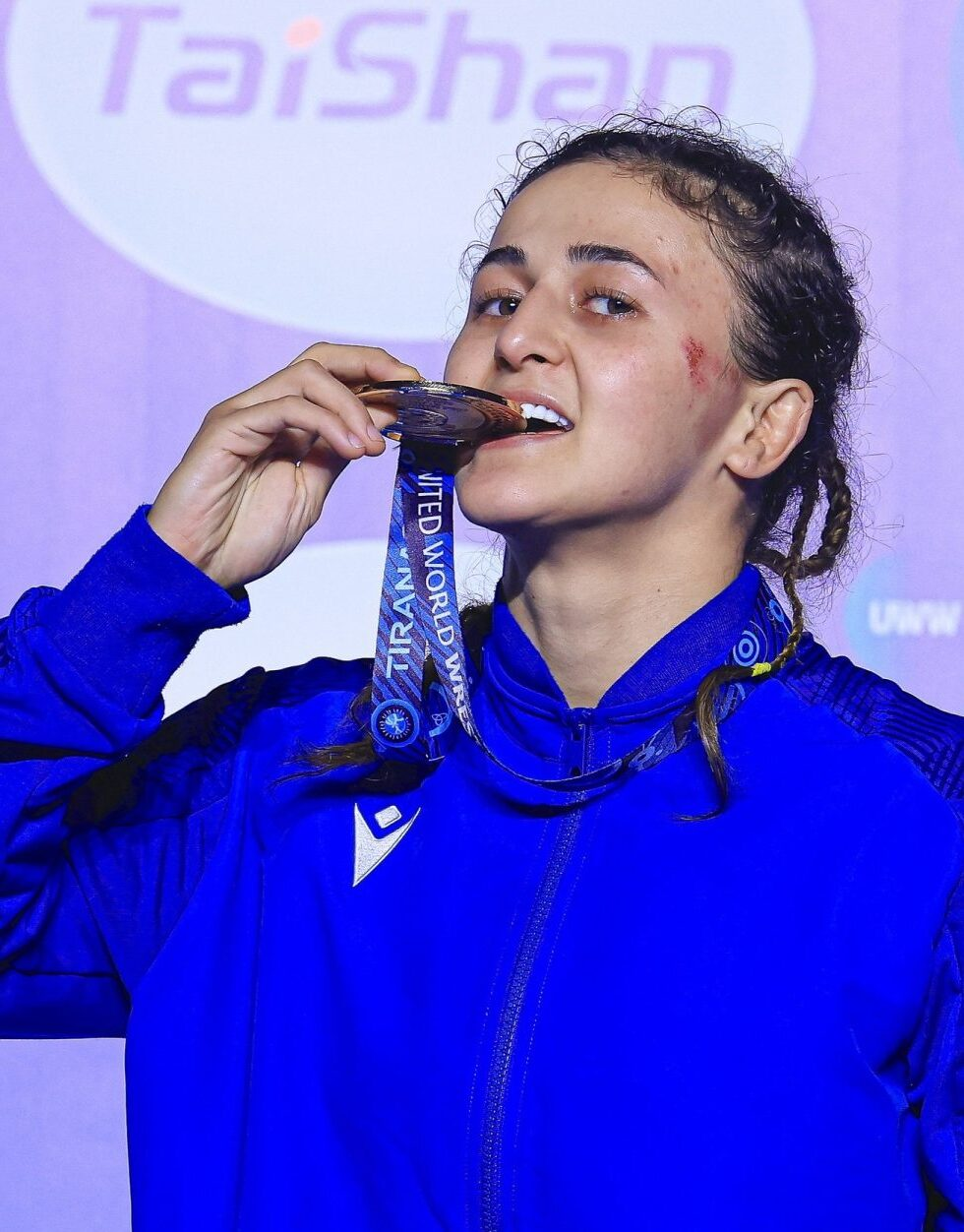

Personal information
- Born: 1 February 2001 (age 25) Ganja, Azerbaijan
- Height: 1.60 m (5 ft 3 in)
- Weight: 57 kg (126 lb)

Sport
- Country: Azerbaijan
- Sport: Women's freestyle wrestling
- Event: 57 kg
Medal record
Women's freestyle wrestling
Representing Azerbaijan
European Championships
Silver medal – second place	2023 Zagreb	57 kg
Bronze medal – third place	2025 Bratislava	57 kg
Islamic Solidarity Games
Gold medal – first place	2021 Konya	57 kg
World Military Championships
Grand Prix
Bronze medal – third place	2023 Bishkek	57 kg
World U23 Championships
Gold medal – first place	2024 Tirana	57 kg
Silver medal – second place	2023 Tirana	57 kg
European U23 Championship
Gold medal – first place	2022 Plovdiv	62 kg
Gold medal – first place	2024 Baku	57 kg
Bronze medal – third place	2023 Bucharest	57 kg
World Juniors Championships
Bronze medal – third place	2021 Ufa	59 kg

Zhala Aliyeva (Azerbaijani: Jalə Əliyeva, born 1 February 2001) is an Azerbaijani freestyle wrestler competing in the 57 kg division. She won the gold medal in her event at the 2021 Islamic Solidarity Games held in Konya, Turkey.

== Career ==
In March 2022 in Sofia, Zhalya Aliyeva became European champion among wrestlers under 23 years old. In August 2022 she won the V Islamic Solidarity Games in Konya. In September of the same year she took part in her debut adult world championship in Belgrade, where she reached the semifinals but lost to Tsugumi Sakurai from Japan and in the bout for the bronze to Alina Grushina from Ukraine.

In 2023, she won the silver medal in the women's freestyle 57 kg event at the 2023 European Wrestling Championships held in Zagreb, Croatia.

She competed at the 2024 European Wrestling Olympic Qualification Tournament in Baku, Azerbaijan hoping to qualify for the 2024 Summer Olympics in Paris, France. She was eliminated in her first match and she did not qualify for the Olympics.

On 23 December 2025, at the event dedicated to the 2025 sports year review organized by the Ministry of Youth and Sports of Azerbaijan, Zhala Aliyeva was awarded the title of “Best Female Athlete of 2025.”

== Achievements ==
Year	Tournament	Location	Result	Event
2022	Islamic Solidarity Games	Konya, Turkey	1st	Freestyle 57 kg
2023	European Championships	Zagreb, Croatia	2nd	Freestyle 57 kg
2025	European Championships	Bratislava, Slovakia	3rd	Freestyle 57 kg
