= 2018 World Wrestling Championships – Women's freestyle 55 kg =

Women's freestyle 55 kg at the 2018 World Championships
- Venue: László Papp Budapest Sports Arena
- Dates: 22–23 October 2018
- Competitors: 21 from 21 nations

Medalists
| gold medal | Mayu Mukaida | Japan |
| silver medal | Zalina Sidakova | Belarus |
| bronze medal | Lianna Montero | Cuba |
| bronze medal | Jong Myong-suk | North Korea |

The women's freestyle 55 kilograms is a competition featured at the 2018 World Wrestling Championships, and was held in Budapest, Hungary on 22 and 23 October.

This freestyle wrestling competition consists of a single-elimination tournament, with a repechage used to determine the winner of two bronze medals. The two finalists face off for gold and silver medals. Each wrestler who loses to one of the two finalists moves into the repechage, culminating in a pair of bronze medal matches featuring the semifinal losers each facing the remaining repechage opponent from their half of the bracket.

== Results ==
Legend

- F — Won by fall

=== Final ===
| Final |
| Zalina Sidakova (BLR) | 2 |
| Mayu Mukaida (JPN) | 12 |

=== Top half ===
Round of 32

Round of 16
Roksana Zasina (POL) | 3
Tetyana Kit (UKR) | 4
Jacarra Winchester (USA) | 12
Ramóna Galambos (HUN) | 1
Lianna Montero (CUB) | 6
Zalina Sidakova (BLR) | 16
Kiều Thị Ly (VIE) | 4
Oh Hye-min (KOR) | 1

Quarterfinals
Tetyana Kit (UKR) | 2
Jacarra Winchester (USA) | 4
Zalina Sidakova (BLR) | 10
Kiều Thị Ly (VIE) | 0

Semifinals
Jacarra Winchester (USA) | 1
Zalina Sidakova (BLR) | 2

=== Bottom half ===
Round of 32
Irina Ologonova (RUS) | 4^{F}
Mia-Lahnee Aquino (GUM) | 0
Jade Parsons (CAN) | 3
Zhang Qi (CHN) | 10
Lenka Hocková (CZE) | 0
Mayu Mukaida (JPN) | 10
Jong Myong-suk (PRK) | 8
Marina Sedneva (KAZ) | 6
Sofia Mattsson (SWE) | 8^{F}
Jessica Lavers-McBain (AUS) | 0

Round of 16
Erkhembayaryn Davaachimeg (MGL) | 11
Seema Bisla (IND) | 0
Irina Ologonova (RUS) | 0
Zhang Qi (CHN) | 2
Mayu Mukaida (JPN) | 8
Jong Myong-suk (PRK) | 0
Sofia Mattsson (SWE) | 8
Bediha Gün (TUR) | 1

Quarterfinals
Erkhembayaryn Davaachimeg (MGL) | 3
Zhang Qi (CHN) | 5
Mayu Mukaida (JPN) | 6
Sofia Mattsson (SWE) | 4

Semifinals
Zhang Qi (CHN) | 1
Mayu Mukaida (JPN) | 8

=== Repechage ===
Repechage round 1
Lenka Hocková (CZE) | 3
Jong Myong-suk (PRK) | 6

Repechage round 2
Lianna Montero (CUB) | 10
Kiều Thị Ly (VIE) | 0
Jong Myong-suk (PRK) | 4
Sofia Mattsson (SWE) | 3

Bronze medals
Lianna Montero (CUB) | 5
Jacarra Winchester (USA) | 4
Jong Myong-suk (PRK) | 2
Zhang Qi (CHN) | 1
