= 2012 World Wrestling Championships – Women's freestyle 59 kg =

Women's freestyle 59 kg at the 2012 World Championships
- Venue: Millennium Place
- Dates: 27 September 2012
- Competitors: 13 from 13 nations

Medalists
gold medal	Zhang Lan	China
silver medal	Zalina Sidakova	Belarus
bronze medal	Tungalagiin Mönkhtuyaa	Mongolia
bronze medal	Olga Butkevych	Great Britain

The women's freestyle 59 kilograms is a competition featured at the 2012 World Wrestling Championships, and was held at the Millennium Place in Strathcona County, Alberta, Canada on 27 September 2012.

This freestyle wrestling competition consisted of a single-elimination tournament, with a repechage used to determine the winners of two bronze medals. The two finalists faced off for gold and silver medals. Each wrestler who lost to one of the two finalists moved into the repechage, culminating in a pair of bronze medal matches featuring the semifinal losers each facing the remaining repechage opponent from their half of the bracket.

Each bout consisted of up to three rounds, lasting two minutes apiece. The wrestler who scored more points in each round was the winner of that rounds; the bout finished when one wrestler had won two rounds (and thus the match).

Zhang Lan of China won the gold medal.

== Results ==
Legend

- F — Won by fall

=== Main bracket ===
Round of 16
Michelle Fazzari (CAN)	0	1	1
Tungalagiin Mönkhtuyaa (MGL)	1	0	3
Olga Butkevych (GBR)	0	2	2
Ekaterina Melnikova (RUS)	1	2	1
Yuliya Ratkevich (AZE)	3	3
Elif Jale Yeşilırmak (TUR)	0	0
Iryna Khariv (UKR)	1	0	0
Kayoko Shimada (JPN)	0	2	6
Lyudmila Mironova (KAZ)	0
Zhang Lan (CHN)	5^{F}

Quarterfinals
Shilpi Sheoran (IND)	1	0
Zalina Sidakova (BLR)	0	7^{F}
Leigh Jaynes (USA)	0	1	1
Tungalagiin Mönkhtuyaa (MGL)	3	0	3
Olga Butkevych (GBR)	0	1	5
Yuliya Ratkevich (AZE)	1	0	1
Kayoko Shimada (JPN)	0	4
Zhang Lan (CHN)	2	6

Semifinals
Zalina Sidakova (BLR)	2	1
Tungalagiin Mönkhtuyaa (MGL)	0	0
Olga Butkevych (GBR)	0	1
Zhang Lan (CHN)	1	5

Final
Zalina Sidakova (BLR)	1	1	0
Zhang Lan (CHN)	0	1	2

=== Repechage ===
Repechage round 1
Lyudmila Mironova (KAZ)	0	0
Kayako Shimada (JPN)	3	6

Bronze medals
Shilpi Sheoran (IND)	3	2
Tungalagiin Mönkhtuyaa (MGL)	3	4
Kayako Shimada (JPN)	2
Olga Butkevych (GBR)	5^{F}
