= 2010 World Wrestling Championships – Women's freestyle 55 kg =

Wrestling competition

Women's freestyle 55 kg at the 2010 World Championships
- Venue: Olympic Stadium
- Dates: 9 September 2010
- Competitors: 23 from 23 nations

Medalists
gold medal	Saori Yoshida	Japan
silver medal	Yuliya Ratkevich	Azerbaijan
bronze medal	Anna Gomis	France
bronze medal	Tatiana Suarez	United States

The women's freestyle 55 kilograms is a competition featured at the 2010 World Wrestling Championships, and was held at the Olympic Stadium in Moscow, Russia on 9 September.

This freestyle wrestling competition consists of a single-elimination tournament, with a repechage used to determine the winner of two bronze medals.

== Results ==
Legend

- F — Won by fall

=== Final ===
Final
Yuliya Ratkevich (AZE)	0	0
Saori Yoshida (JPN)	2	6

=== Top half ===
Round of 32

Round of 16
Minerva Montero (ESP)	0	0
Anna Gomis (FRA)	2	2
Jillian Gallays (CAN)	3	1	7
Yang Senlian (CHN)	0	1	1
Aiyim Abdildina (KAZ)	1	0	3
Lenka Martináková (CZE)	0	3	1
Sian Law (NZL)	0	0
Yuliya Ratkevich (AZE)	4	4^{F}

Quarterfinals
Anna Gomis (FRA)	2	4
Jillian Gallays (CAN)	1	2
Aiyim Abdildina (KAZ)	0	0
Yuliya Ratkevich (AZE)	3	3

Semifinals
Anna Gomis (FRA)	0	0
Yuliya Ratkevich (AZE)	8	6

=== Bottom half ===
Round of 32
Sylwia Bileńska (POL)	1	5
Dilek Atakol (TUR)	0	2
Iryna Khariv (UKR)	4	0
Sündeviin Byambatseren (MGL)	1	3^{F}
Valentina Minguzzi (ITA)	0	0
Maria Gurova (RUS)	1	3
Um Ji-eun (KOR)	0	0
Saori Yoshida (JPN)	4	3^{F}
Tamara Kazaryan (UZB)	3	1
Lissette Antes (ECU)	0	0
Zalina Sidakova (BLR)	0	4
Tatiana Suarez (USA)	2	7
Ana Maria Pavăl (ROU)	0	1	1
Emese Szabó (HUN)	2	0	0

Round of 16
Marwa Amri (TUN)	1	3
Sylwia Bileńska (POL)	0	1
Sündeviin Byambatseren (MGL)	1	1
Maria Gurova (RUS)	4	3
Saori Yoshida (JPN)	6	6
Tamara Kazaryan (UZB)	0	0
Tatiana Suarez (USA)	1	3	6
Ana Maria Pavăl (ROU)	3	3	0

Quarterfinals
Marwa Amri (TUN)	1	0
Maria Gurova (RUS)	5	1
Saori Yoshida (JPN)	3	7
Tatiana Suarez (USA)	0	0

Semifinals
Maria Gurova (RUS)	0	0
Saori Yoshida (JPN)	5	3

=== Repechage ===
Repechage round 1
Um Ji-eun (KOR)	1	1
Tamara Kazaryan (UZB)	0	0

Repechage round 2
Sian Law (NZL)	0
Aiyim Abdildina (KAZ)	4^{F}
Um Ji-eun (KOR)	0	4
Tatiana Suarez (USA)	1	5

Bronze medals
Aiyim Abdildina (KAZ)	1	0	0
Anna Gomis (FRA)	0	3	8
Tatiana Suarez (USA)	1	4^{F}
Maria Gurova (RUS)	1	0
