= 2017 World Wrestling Championships – Women's freestyle 55 kg =

Women's freestyle 55 kg at the 2017 World Championships
- Venue: AccorHotels Arena
- Dates: 23 August 2017
- Competitors: 24 from 24 nations

Medalists
gold medal	Haruna Okuno	Japan
silver medal	Odunayo Adekuoroye	Nigeria
bronze medal	Becka Leathers	United States
bronze medal	Iryna Kurachkina	Belarus

The women's freestyle 55 kilograms is a competition featured at the 2017 World Wrestling Championships, and was held in Paris, France on 23 August 2017.

This freestyle wrestling competition consisted of a single-elimination tournament, with a repechage used to determine the winners of two bronze medals.

== Results ==
Legend

- F — Won by fall
- R — Retired

=== Final ===
Final
Haruna Okuno (JPN)	5
Odunayo Adekuoroye (NGR)	4

=== Top half ===
Round of 32

Round of 16
Haruna Okuno (JPN)	8
Carola Rainero (ITA)	0
Ramóna Galambos (HUN)	0
Becka Leathers (USA)	4^{F}
Marina Sedneva (KAZ)	12
Nazira Marsbek Kyzy (KGZ)	1
Zhang Qi (CHN)	1
Bilyana Dudova (BUL)	9

Quarterfinals
Haruna Okuno (JPN)	8
Becka Leathers (USA)	0
Marina Sedneva (KAZ)	5
Bilyana Dudova (BUL)	9

Semifinals
Haruna Okuno (JPN)	11
Bilyana Dudova (BUL)	0

=== Bottom half ===
Round of 32
Lee Shin-hye (KOR)	2
Bediha Gün (TUR)	6
Erkhembayaryn Davaachimeg (MGL)	7
Tetyana Kit (UKR)	6
Mathilde Rivière (FRA)	9
Odunayo Adekuoroye (NGR)	13
Kiều Thị Ly (VIE)	3
Lenka Hocková (CZE)	4
Carissa Holland (AUS)	0
Maria Gurova (RUS)	8^{F}
Paula Kozłow (POL)	0^{R}
Lalita Sehrawat (IND)	0
Nataliya Synyshyn (AZE)	1
Iryna Kurachkina (BLR)	2
Sandra Paruszewski (GER)	1
Diana Weicker (CAN)	5

Round of 16
Bediha Gün (TUR)	3
Erkhembayaryn Davaachimeg (MGL)	8
Odunayo Adekuoroye (NGR)	10
Lenka Hocková (CZE)	0
Maria Gurova (RUS)	3
Lalita Sehrawat (IND)	0
Iryna Kurachkina (BLR)	10
Diana Weicker (CAN)	2

Quarterfinals
Erkhembayaryn Davaachimeg (MGL)	4
Odunayo Adekuoroye (NGR)	8
Maria Gurova (RUS)	0
Iryna Kurachkina (BLR)	8

Semifinals
Odunayo Adekuoroye (NGR)	10
Iryna Kurachkina (BLR)	0

=== Repechage ===
Repechage round 1
Mathilde Rivière (FRA)	10
Lenka Hocková (CZE)	0

Repechage round 2
Carola Rainero (ITA)	2
Becka Leathers (USA)	13
Mathilde Rivière (FRA)	4
Erkhembayaryn Davaachimeg (MGL)	0

Bronze medals
Becka Leathers (USA)	4
Bilyana Dudova (BUL)	2
Mathilde Rivière (FRA)	1
Iryna Kurachkina (BLR)	9
