= 2016 European Wrestling Championships – Women's freestyle 55 kg =

The women's freestyle 55 kg is a competition featured at the 2016 European Wrestling Championships, and was held in Riga, Latvia on March 10.

== Medalists ==
Gold	Irina Ologonova; Russia
Silver	Tetyana Kit; Ukraine
Bronze	Roksana Zasina; Poland
Bronze	Ramóna Galambos; Hungary

== Results ==
Legend

- F — Won by fall

=== Top half ===
==== Section 1 ====
Qualification
Vania Gomes Guerreiro (POR)	0
Simona Pricob (ROM)	12
Ramóna Galambos (HUN)	0
Irina Ologonova (RUS)	4
Eileen Friedrich (GER)	2
Lenka Martinakova (CZE)	1
Maria Prevolaraki (GRE)	4
Evelina Nikolova (BUL)	3
Zalina Sidakova (BLR)	10
Burcu Kebic (TUR)	0
Silvia Felice (ITA)	0
Roksana Zasina (POL)	5^{F}
Anastassia Krasanova (EST)	0
Tetyana Kit (UKR)	4^{F}

Quarterfinals
Alyona Kolesnik (AZE)	0
Simona Pricob (ROM)	10
Irina Ologonova (RUS)	13
Eileen Friedrich (GER)	2
Maria Prevolaraki (GRE)	1
Zalina Sidakova (BLR)	2
Roksana Zasina (POL)	0
Tetyana Kit (UKR)	2

Semifinals
Simona Pricob (ROM)	0
Irina Ologonova (RUS)	10
Zalina Sidakova (BLR)	0
Tetyana Kit (UKR)	10

Final
Irina Ologonova (RUS)	6
Tetyana Kit (UKR)	4

=== Repechage ===
Repechage round 2
Ramóna Galambos (HUN)	9
Eileen Friedrich (GER)	3
Anastassia Krasanova (EST)	0
Roksana Zasina (POL)	10

Bronze medals
Ramóna Galambos (HUN)	10
Simona Pricob (ROM)	0
Roksana Zasina (POL)	8
Zalina Sidakova (BLR)	1
