= Wrestling at the 2015 European Games – Women's freestyle 55 kg =

Women's freestyle 55 kg at the 2015 European Games
- Venue: Heydar Aliyev Arena
- Date: 15 June
- Competitors: 13 from 13 nations

Medalists
gold medal	Sofia Mattsson	Sweden
silver medal	Katarzyna Krawczyk	Poland
bronze medal	Evelina Nikolova	Bulgaria
bronze medal	Nataliya Synyshyn	Azerbaijan

Women's freestyle 55 kg competition at the 2015 European Games in Baku, Azerbaijan, took place on 15 June at the Heydar Aliyev Arena.

== Schedule ==
All times are Azerbaijan Summer Time (UTC+05:00)

Date	Time	Event
Monday, 15 June 2015	11:00	1/8 finals
Monday, 15 June 2015	13:00	Quarterfinals
Monday, 15 June 2015	13:00	Semifinals
Monday, 15 June 2015	15:00	Repechage
Monday, 15 June 2015	19:00	Finals

== Results ==
Legend

- F — Won by fall

1/8 finals
(Bulgaria) Evelina Nikolova (BUL)	6
(Poland) Katarzyna Krawczyk (POL)	12
(Italy) Patrizia Liuzzi (ITA)	0
(Azerbaijan) Nataliya Synyshyn (AZE)	10
(Spain) Karima Sánchez (ESP)	4
(Turkey) Bediha Gün (TUR)	6
(Sweden) Sofia Mattsson (SWE)	10
(Germany) Laura Mertens (GER)	0
(Ukraine) Tetyana Kit (UKR)	10^{F}
(Romania) Simona Pricob (ROU)	2

Quarterfinals
(Belarus) Katsiaryna Hanchar (BLR)	0
(Russia) Irina Ologonova (RUS)	13^{F}
(France) Mathilde Rivière (FRA)	2
(Poland) Katarzyna Krawczyk (POL)	8
(Azerbaijan) Nataliya Synyshyn (AZE)	12^{F}
(Turkey) Bediha Gün (TUR)	0
(Sweden) Sofia Mattsson (SWE)	8^{F}
(Ukraine) Tetyana Kit (UKR)	0

Semifinals
(Russia) Irina Ologonova (RUS)	4
(Poland) Katarzyna Krawczyk (POL)	6
(Azerbaijan) Nataliya Synyshyn (AZE)	5
(Sweden) Sofia Mattsson (SWE)	6

Final
(Poland) Katarzyna Krawczyk (POL)	1
(Sweden) Sofia Mattsson (SWE)	12

=== Repechage ===
Repechage round 1
(Bulgaria) Evelina Nikolova (BUL)	7
(France) Mathilde Rivière (FRA)	0
(Germany) Laura Mertens (GER)	0
(Ukraine) Tetyana Kit (UKR)	10

Bronze medal match
(Bulgaria) Evelina Nikolova (BUL)	8
(Russia) Irina Ologonova (RUS)	8
(Ukraine) Tetyana Kit (UKR)	0
(Azerbaijan) Nataliya Synyshyn (AZE)	10
