= 2013 World Wrestling Championships – Women's freestyle 51 kg =

Women's freestyle 51 kg at the 2013 World Championships
- Venue: László Papp Budapest Sports Arena
- Dates: 18 September 2013
- Competitors: 23 from 23 nations

Medalists
gold medal	Sun Yanan	China
silver medal	Erdenechimegiin Sumiyaa	Mongolia
bronze medal	So Sim-hyang	North Korea
bronze medal	Jessica MacDonald	Canada

The women's freestyle 51 kilograms is a competition featured at the 2013 World Wrestling Championships, and was held at the László Papp Budapest Sports Arena in Budapest, Hungary on 18 September 2013.

This freestyle wrestling competition consisted of a single-elimination tournament, with a repechage used to determine the winners of two bronze medals.

== Results ==
Legend

- F — Won by fall

=== Final ===
Final
Erdenechimegiin Sumiyaa (MGL)	0
Sun Yanan (CHN)	7

=== Top half ===
Round of 32

Round of 16
Victoria Anthony (USA)	8^{F}
Valya Trandeva (BUL)	4
Zulfiya Yakhyarova (KAZ)	6
Roksana Zasina (POL)	6
Kim Hyung-joo (KOR)	3
So Sim-hyang (PRK)	10
Erdenechimegiin Sumiyaa (MGL)	6^{F}
Nguyễn Thị Lụa (VIE)	2

Quarterfinals
Victoria Anthony (USA)	7
Roksana Zasina (POL)	0
So Sim-hyang (PRK)	8
Erdenechimegiin Sumiyaa (MGL)	10

Semifinals
Victoria Anthony (USA)	6
Erdenechimegiin Sumiyaa (MGL)	2^{F}

=== Bottom half ===
Round of 32
Kitti Kőrösi (HUN)	0
Yuliya Blahinya (UKR)	8
Sun Yanan (CHN)	9
Ekaterina Krasnova (RUS)	3
Iryna Kurachkina (BLR)	12
Burcu Kebiç (TUR)	4
Yu Miyahara (JPN)	9
Aguis Rivas (VEN)	0
Jessica MacDonald (CAN)	5
Karalina Tjapko (LAT)	0
Mpho Madi (RSA)	0
Isabelle Sambou (SEN)	8
Wendy Martínez (MEX)	0
Vinesh Phogat (IND)	7

Round of 16
Nina Hemmer (GER)	3
Yuliya Blahinya (UKR)	3
Sun Yanan (CHN)	10
Iryna Kurachkina (BLR)	2
Yu Miyahara (JPN)	3
Jessica MacDonald (CAN)	8
Isabelle Sambou (SEN)	6
Vinesh Phogat (IND)	3

Quarterfinals
Yuliya Blahinya (UKR)	2
Sun Yanan (CHN)	9
Jessica MacDonald (CAN)	8
Isabelle Sambou (SEN)	0

Semifinals
Sun Yanan (CHN)	7
Jessica MacDonald (CAN)	0

=== Repechage ===
Repechage round 1
Ekaterina Krasnova (RUS)	7
Iryna Kurachkina (BLR)	7

Repechage round 2
Nguyễn Thị Lụa (VIE)	0
So Sim-hyang (PRK)	8^{F}
Iryna Kurachkina (BLR)	3
Yuliya Blahinya (UKR)	8

Bronze medals
So Sim-hyang (PRK)	8
Victoria Anthony (USA)	0
Yuliya Blahinya (UKR)	6
Jessica MacDonald (CAN)	8
