= 2014 World Wrestling Championships – Women's freestyle 55 kg =

Women's freestyle 55 kg at the 2014 World Championships
- Venue: Gymnastics Sport Palace
- Dates: 10 September 2014
- Competitors: 19 from 19 nations

Medalists
gold medal	Chiho Hamada	Japan
silver medal	Irina Ologonova	Russia
bronze medal	Helen Maroulis	United States
bronze medal	Iryna Khariv	Ukraine

The Women's freestyle 55 kilograms is a competition featured at the 2014 World Wrestling Championships, and was held in Tashkent, Uzbekistan on 10 September 2014.

This freestyle wrestling competition consisted of a single-elimination tournament, with a repechage used to determine the winners of two bronze medals.

== Results ==
Legend

- F — Won by fall

=== Final ===
Final
Chiho Hamada (JPN)	4
Irina Ologonova (RUS)	3

=== Top half ===
Round of 32

Round of 16
Sevara Eshmuratova (UZB)	0
Giullia Penalber (BRA)	4^{F}
Katarzyna Krawczyk (POL)	2
Chiho Hamada (JPN)	4
Helen Maroulis (USA)	9^{F}
Elverine Jiménez (NCA)	1
Pooja Dhanda (IND)	0
Altansetsegiin Battsetseg (MGL)	10

Quarterfinals
Giullia Penalber (BRA)	1
Chiho Hamada (JPN)	8^{F}
Helen Maroulis (USA)	5^{F}
Altansetsegiin Battsetseg (MGL)	2

Semifinals
Chiho Hamada (JPN)	6
Helen Maroulis (USA)	2

=== Bottom half ===
Round of 32
Evelina Nikolova (BUL)	0
Zalina Sidakova (BLR)	12^{F}
Brittanee Laverdure (CAN)	6
Lenka Hocková (CZE)	0
Irina Ologonova (RUS)	11
Karima Sánchez (ESP)	4

Round of 16
Miruyert Dynbayeva (KAZ)	0
Dong Jiahui (CHN)	10
Aurélie Basset (FRA)	3
Iryna Khariv (UKR)	11
Marwa Amri (TUN)	8^{F}
Zalina Sidakova (BLR)	0
Brittanee Laverdure (CAN)	0
Irina Ologonova (RUS)	3

Quarterfinals
Dong Jiahui (CHN)	1
Iryna Khariv (UKR)	4
Marwa Amri (TUN)	7
Irina Ologonova (RUS)	12

Semifinals
Iryna Khariv (UKR)	3
Irina Ologonova (RUS)	6

=== Repechage ===
Repechage round 1
Karima Sánchez (ESP)	8
Brittanee Laverdure (CAN)	4

Repechage round 2
Katarzyna Krawczyk (POL)	9
Giullia Penalber (BRA)	2
Karima Sánchez (ESP)	7
Marwa Amri (TUN)	6

Bronze medals
Katarzyna Krawczyk (POL)	0
Helen Maroulis (USA)	10
Karima Sánchez (ESP)	1
Iryna Khariv (UKR)	11
