= Anshu Malik =

Indian freestyle wrestler

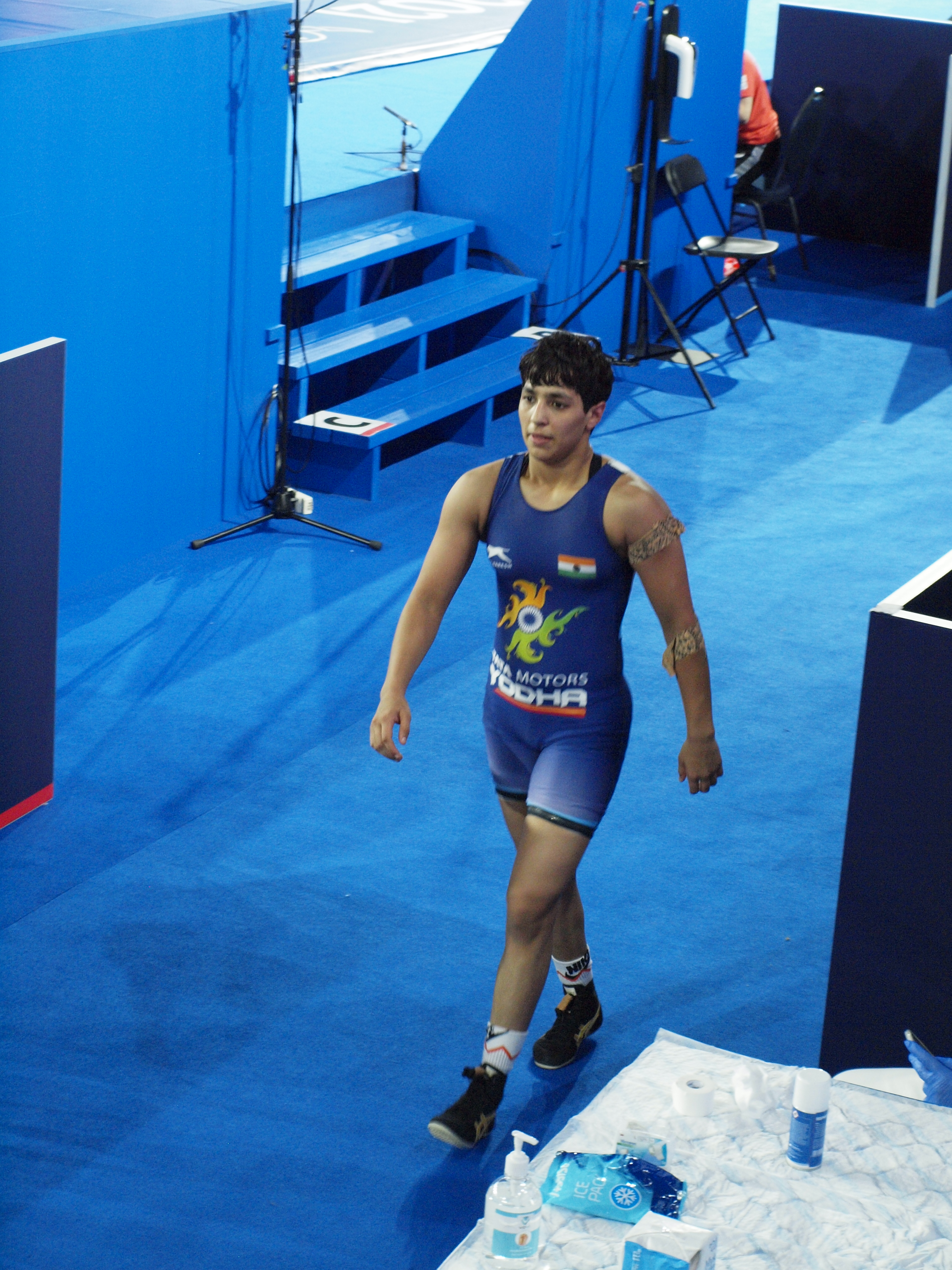
- Malik at the 2021 World Championships

Personal information
- Born: 5 August 2001 (age 25) Nidani, Haryana, India
- Height: 1.6 m (5 ft 3 in)

Sport
- Sport: Wrestling
- Weight class: 57 kg
- Event: Freestyle
Medal record
Women's freestyle wrestling
Representing India
World Championships
Silver medal – second place	2021 Oslo	57kg
World Cup
Silver medal – second place	2020 Belgrade	57kg
Commonwealth Games
Silver medal – second place	2022 Birmingham	57kg
Asian Championships
Gold medal – first place	2021 Almaty	57kg
Silver medal – second place	2022 Ulaanbaatar	57kg
Bronze medal – third place	2020 New Delhi	57kg
Bronze medal – third place	2023 Astana	57kg
Grand Prix
Silver medal – second place	2020 Rome	57kg
Silver medal – second place	2024 Budapest	57kg
U20 World Championships
Bronze medal – third place	2018 Trnava	59kg
U20 Asian Championships
Gold medal – first place	2019 Chon Buri	59kg
U17 World Championships
Gold medal – first place	2017 Athens	60kg
Bronze medal – third place	2016 Tbilisi	60kg
Bronze medal – third place	2018 Zagreb	60kg
U17 Asian Championships
Gold medal – first place	2018 Tashkent	61kg
Silver medal – second place	2016 Taichung	60kg

Anshu Malik (born 5 August 2001) is an Indian freestyle wrestler. She won a silver medal in the women's 57 kg event at the 2021 World Wrestling Championships.

== Career ==
Anshu won gold in the 60 kg category of the Cadet Wrestling Championships.

In 2020, she won one of the bronze medals in the 57 kg event at the 2020 Asian Wrestling Championships held in New Delhi, India. In the same year, she won the silver medal in the women's 57 kg event at the 2020 Individual Wrestling World Cup held in Belgrade, Serbia.

In Asian Wrestling Championships 2021, Malik bagged Gold along with her Indian teammates Vinesh Phogat and Divya Kakran.

In April 2022, she won one of the bronze medals in the 57 kg event at the 2022 Asian Wrestling Championships held in Ulaanbaatar.

In the 2022 Birmingham Commonwealth Games, she had to settle for the Silver Medal after reaching the women's 57 kg freestyle final.

After overcoming an injury with a long recovery period, she went on to win the National Wrestling Championships against Sarita Mor. She trained with the undefeated Japanese wrestler Akari Fujinami in 2024 in order to prepare for the 2024 Summer Olympics in Paris, France. She competed at the 2024 Asian Wrestling Olympic Qualification Tournament in Bishkek, Kyrgyzstan and she earned a quota place for India for the 2024 Summer Olympics. She competed in the women's 57 kg event at the Olympics.

== Personal life ==
She was born in a Jat Malik family. She comes from a family of wrestlers. She trains under coach Jagdeesh at the Chaudhary Bharat Singh Memorial Sports School in Nidani. Anshu's father Dharamvir Malik, was an international wrestler himself and worked with the CISF.

== Senior career results ==
Res.	Record	Opponent	Score	Date	Event	Location
(silver) Silver Medal at 57 kg
Loss	34-13	Hong Kexin (CHN)	1-12	5 August 2022	2024 Polyák Imre & Varga János Memorial Tournament	(Hungary) Budapest
Win	34-12	Zhang Qi (CHN)	2-1	5 August 2022	2024 Polyák Imre & Varga János Memorial Tournament	(Hungary) Budapest
Win	33-12	Anastasia Nichita (MDA)	6-5	5 August 2022	2024 Polyák Imre & Varga János Memorial Tournament	(Hungary) Budapest
Qualified tied 1st at 57 kg
Win	32-12	Laylokhon Sobirova (UZB)	11-0	20 April 2024	2024 Asian Wrestling Olympic Qualification Tournament	(Kyrgyzstan) Bishkek
Win	31-12	Kalmira Bilimbek kyzy (KGZ)	12-1	20 April 2024	2024 Asian Wrestling Olympic Qualification Tournament	(Kyrgyzstan) Bishkek
(bronze) Bronze Medal at 53 kg
Win	30-12	Bat-Erdeniin Erdenesuvd (MGL)	14-0	12 April 2023	2023 Asian Wrestling Championships	(Kazakhstan) Astana
Loss	29-12	Sae Nanjo (JPN)	2-8	12 April 2023	2023 Asian Wrestling Championships	(Kazakhstan) Astana
Win	29-11	Zhang Qi (CHN)	8-5	12 April 2023	2023 Asian Wrestling Championships	(Kazakhstan) Astana
Win	28-11	Danielle Lim (SGP)	15-0	12 April 2023	2023 Asian Wrestling Championships	(Kazakhstan) Astana
(silver) Silver Medal at 57 kg
Loss	27-11	Odunayo Adekuoroye (NGR)	4-10	5 August 2022	2022 Commonwealth Games	(United Kingdom) Birmingham
Win	27-10	Nethmi Poruthotage (SRI)	14-0	5 August 2022	2022 Commonwealth Games	(United Kingdom) Birmingham
Win	26-10	Irene Symeonidis (AUS)	14-0	5 August 2022	2022 Commonwealth Games	(United Kingdom) Birmingham
(silver) Silver Medal at 57 kg
Loss	25-10	Tsugumi Sakurai (JPN)	0-9, Fall	22 April 2022	2022 Asian Wrestling Championships	(Mongolia) Ulaanbaatar
Win	24-9	Khürelkhüügiin Bolortuyaa (MGL)	15-0	22 April 2022	2022 Asian Wrestling Championships	(Mongolia) Ulaanbaatar
Win	23-9	Danielle Lim (SGP)	14-0	22 April 2022	2022 Asian Wrestling Championships	(Mongolia) Ulaanbaatar
Win	22-9	Shokhida Akhmedova (UZB)	14-0	22 April 2022	2022 Asian Wrestling Championships	(Mongolia) Ulaanbaatar
(silver) Silver Medal at 57 kg
Loss	21-9	Helen Maroulis (USA)	1-9, Fall	6 - 7 October 2021	2021 World Wrestling Championships	(Norway) Oslo
Win	21-8	Solomiia Vynnyk (UKR)	15-0	6 - 7 October 2021	2021 World Wrestling Championships	(Norway) Oslo
Win	20-8	Erkhembayaryn Davaachimeg (MGL)	8-2	6 - 7 October 2021	2021 World Wrestling Championships	(Norway) Oslo
Win	19-8	Nilufar Raimova (KAZ)	19-6	6 - 7 October 2021	2021 World Wrestling Championships	(Norway) Oslo
Tied 9th at 57 kg
Loss	18-8	Valeria Koblova (RUS)	2-8	4 - 5 August 2021	2020 Summer Olympics	(Japan) Tokyo
Loss	18-7	Iryna Kurachkina (BLR)	3-11	4 - 5 August 2021	2020 Summer Olympics	(Japan) Tokyo
(gold) Gold Medal at 57 kg
Win	18-6	Altantsetsegiin Battsetseg (MGL)	3-0	16 April 2021	2021 Asian Wrestling Championships	(Kazakhstan) Almaty
Win	17-6	Lee Shin-hye (KOR)	7-2, Fall	16 April 2021	2021 Asian Wrestling Championships	(Kazakhstan) Almaty
Win	16-6	Altantsetsegiin Battsetseg (MGL)	14-1	16 April 2021	2021 Asian Wrestling Championships	(Kazakhstan) Almaty
Win	15-6	Nazira Marsbek Kyzy (KGZ)	14-0	16 April 2021	2021 Asian Wrestling Championships	(Kazakhstan) Almaty
Win	14-6	Sevara Eshmuratova (UZB)	14-0	16 April 2021	2021 Asian Wrestling Championships	(Kazakhstan) Almaty
(silver) Silver Medal at 57 kg
Loss	13-6	Boldsaikhan Khongorzul (MGL)	5-10	10 April 2021	2021 Asian Wrestling Olympic Qualification Tournament	(Kazakhstan) Almaty
Win	13-5	Shokhida Akhmedova (UZB)	16-3	10 April 2021	2021 Asian Wrestling Olympic Qualification Tournament	(Kazakhstan) Almaty
Win	12-5	Emma Tissina (KAZ)	14-0	10 April 2021	2021 Asian Wrestling Olympic Qualification Tournament	(Kazakhstan) Almaty
Win	11-5	Um Ji-eun (KOR)	7-3	10 April 2021	2021 Asian Wrestling Olympic Qualification Tournament	(Kazakhstan) Almaty
Tied 5th at 57 kg
Loss	10-5	Francesca Indelicato (ITA)	0-14	4 - 5 March 2021	Matteo Pellicone Ranking Series 2021	(Italy) Rome
Loss	10-4	Giullia Penalber (BRA)	7-15	4 - 5 March 2021	Matteo Pellicone Ranking Series 2021	(Italy) Rome
Win	10-3	Evelina Nikolova (BUL)	14-7	4 - 5 March 2021	Matteo Pellicone Ranking Series 2021	(Italy) Rome
(bronze) Bronze Medal at 57 kg
Loss	9-3	Anastasia Nichita (MDA)	2-8	15 - 16 December 2020	2020 Individual Wrestling World Cup	(Serbia) Belgrade
Win	9-2	Veronika Chumikova (RUS)	12-4, Fall	15 - 16 December 2020	2020 Individual Wrestling World Cup	(Serbia) Belgrade
Win	8-2	Laura Mertens (GER)	6-2	15 - 16 December 2020	2020 Individual Wrestling World Cup	(Serbia) Belgrade
Win	7-2	Alyona Kolesnik (AZE)	7-3	15 - 16 December 2020	2020 Individual Wrestling World Cup	(Serbia) Belgrade
(bronze) Bronze Medal at 57 kg
Win	6-2	Sevara Eshmuratova (UZB)	7-2	21 February 2020	2020 Asian Wrestling Championships	(India) New Delhi
Loss	5-2	Risako Kawai (JPN)	0-14	21 February 2020	2020 Asian Wrestling Championships	(India) New Delhi
Win	5-1	Saida Anarkulova (KGZ)	15-2	21 February 2020	2020 Asian Wrestling Championships	(India) New Delhi
(silver) Silver Medal at 57 kg
Loss	4-1	Odunayo Adekuoroye (NGR)	0-14	15 January 2020	2020 Matteo Pellicone Ranking Series	(Italy) Rome
Win	4-0	Jenna Rose Burkert (USA)	14-0	15 January 2020	2020 Matteo Pellicone Ranking Series	(Italy) Rome
Win	3-0	Grace Bullen (NOR)	7-5	15 January 2020	2020 Matteo Pellicone Ranking Series	(Italy) Rome
Win	2-0	Linda Morais (CAN)	13-4	15 January 2020	2020 Matteo Pellicone Ranking Series	(Italy) Rome
Win	1-0	Maria Victoria Baez Dilone (SPA)	14-0	15 January 2020	2020 Matteo Pellicone Ranking Series	(Italy) Rome
