= 2013 European Wrestling Championships – Women's freestyle 51 kg =

The women's freestyle 51 kg is a competition featured at the 2013 European Wrestling Championships, and was held at the Tbilisi Sports Palace in Tbilisi, Georgia on 20 March 2013.

== Medalists ==
Gold	Roksana Zasina; Poland
Silver	*Yuliya Blahinya; Ukraine
Bronze	Ekaterina Krasnova; Russia
Bronze	Tiina Ylinen Finland

(*) Romanian original silver medallist Estera Dobre was disqualified after her doping sample had been tested positive in August 2013.

== Results ==
Legend

- F — Won by fall

=== Main Draw ===
Round of 16
Eileen Friedrich (GER)	0	0
Roksana Zasina (POL)	2	2
Isabelle Ladevèze (FRA)	6	1
Valya Trandeva (BUL)	0	1
Burcu Kebiç (TUR)	1	0	7^{F}
Anzhela Dorogan (AZE)	0	1	2
Kitti Kőrösi (HUN)	0
Yuliya Blahinya (UKR)	7^{F}
Karalina Tjapko (LAT)	1	3	5
Francesca Mori (ITA)	3	0	2
Tiina Ylinen (FIN)	0	0
~~Estera Dobre (ROU)~~	1	4

Quarterfinals
Ekaterina Krasnova (RUS)	1	1	3
Iryna Kurachkina (BLR)	1	0	1
Roksana Zasina (POL)	4	0	2
Isabelle Ladevèze (FRA)	1	2	1
Burcu Kebiç (TUR)	1
Yuliya Blahinya (UKR)	6^{F}
Karalina Tjapko (LAT)	0
~~Estera Dobre (ROU)~~	4^{F}

Semifinals
Ekaterina Krasnova (RUS)	0	0
Roksana Zasina (POL)	1	1
Yuliya Blahinya (UKR)	0	2	0
~~Estera Dobre (ROU)~~	3	1	1

Final
Roksana Zasina (POL)	0	1	1
~~Estera Dobre (ROU)~~	1	0	0

=== Repechage ===
Repechage round 1
Eileen Friedrich (GER)	4^{F}
Isabelle Ladevèze (FRA)	0
Tiina Ylinen (FIN)	5	3
Karalina Tjapko (LAT)	0	2

Bronze medals
Eileen Friedrich (GER)	2	0	0
Ekaterina Krasnova (RUS)	1	7	4
Tiina Ylinen (FIN)	0
Yuliya Blahinya (UKR)	5^{F}
