= 2016 World Wrestling Championships – Women's freestyle 55 kg =

Women's freestyle 55 kg at the 2016 World Championships
- Venue: SYMA Sports and Conference Centre
- Dates: 10 December 2016
- Competitors: 17 from 17 nations

Medalists
gold medal	Mayu Mukaida	Japan
silver medal	Irina Ologonova	Russia
bronze medal	Aiyim Abdildina	Kazakhstan
bronze medal	Davaasükhiin Otgontsetseg	Mongolia

The women's freestyle 55 kilograms is a competition featured at the 2016 World Wrestling Championships, and was held in Budapest, Hungary on 10 December.

== Results ==
Legend

- F — Won by fall

=== Final ===
Final
Mayu Mukaida (JPN)	10
Irina Ologonova (RUS)	0

=== Top half ===
Round of 32

Round of 16
Mathilde Rivière (FRA)	0
Tetyana Kit (UKR)	6^{F}
Aiyim Abdildina (KAZ)	6
Roksana Zasina (POL)	1
Elena Yakimchuk (BUL)	0
Ramóna Galambos (HUN)	3^{F}
Mayu Mukaida (JPN)	13
Sarah Hildebrandt (USA)	2

Quarterfinals
Tetyana Kit (UKR)	3
Aiyim Abdildina (KAZ)	5
Ramóna Galambos (HUN)	0
Mayu Mukaida (JPN)	10

Semifinals
Aiyim Abdildina (KAZ)	0
Mayu Mukaida (JPN)	10

=== Bottom half ===
Round of 32
Irina Ologonova (RUS)	10
Burcu Kebiç (TUR)	0

Round of 16
Katsiaryna Hanchar (BLR)	12
Chiu Jo-cih (TPE)	1
Lalita Sehrawat (IND)	0
Iulia Leorda (MDA)	2
Davaasükhiin Otgontsetseg (MGL)	10
Alyona Kolesnik (AZE)	5
Jaqueline Schellin (GER)	0
Irina Ologonova (RUS)	10

Quarterfinals
Katsiaryna Hanchar (BLR)	5
Iulia Leorda (MDA)	4
Davaasükhiin Otgontsetseg (MGL)	0
Irina Ologonova (RUS)	5

Semifinals
Katsiaryna Hanchar (BLR)	2
Irina Ologonova (RUS)	12

=== Repechage ===
Repechage round 1
Burcu Kebiç (TUR)	4
Jaqueline Schellin (GER)	6^{F}

Repechage round 2
Sarah Hildebrandt (USA)	4
Ramóna Galambos (HUN)	7
Jaqueline Schellin (GER)	0
Davaasükhiin Otgontsetseg (MGL)	10

Bronze medals
Ramóna Galambos (HUN)	0
Aiyim Abdildina (KAZ)	8^{F}
Davaasükhiin Otgontsetseg (MGL)	10
Katsiaryna Hanchar (BLR)	0
