= 2018 European Wrestling Championships – Women's freestyle 55 kg =

The women's freestyle 55 kg is a competition featured at the 2018 European Wrestling Championships, and was held in Kaspiysk, Russia on May 2 and May 3.

== Medalists ==
Gold	Iryna Kurachkina; Belarus
Silver	Roksana Zasina; Poland
Bronze	Bediha Gün; Turkey
Bronze	Maria Gurova; Russia

== Results ==
Legend

- F — Won by fall

=== Main Bracket ===
1/8 finals
Simona Pricob (ROU)	1
Elena Brugger (GER)	6
Lenka Hocková (CZE)	4
Ramóna Galambos (HUN)	1
Maria Gurova (RUS)	2
Iryna Kurachkina (BLR)	9

Quarterfinals
Bediha Gün (TUR)	4^{F}
Solmaz Hashimzada (AZE)	0
Roksana Zasina (POL)	10
Anna Voitova (UKR)	0
Evelina Nikolova (BUL)	5^{F}
Elena Brugger (GER)	0
Lenka Hocková (CZE)	0
Iryna Kurachkina (BLR)	11

Semifinals
Bediha Gün (TUR)	1
Roksana Zasina (POL)	2
Evelina Nikolova (BUL)	0
Iryna Kurachkina (BLR)	6

Final
Roksana Zasina (POL)	4
Iryna Kurachkina (BLR)	4

=== Repechage ===
Repechage round 1
Maria Gurova (RUS)	4
Lenka Hocková (CZE)	0

Bronze medal match
Anna Voitova (UKR)	0
Bediha Gün (TUR)	10
Maria Gurova (RUS)	10^{F}
Evelina Nikolova (BUL)	6
