= Tatiana Suarez =

American mixed martial artist and wrestler

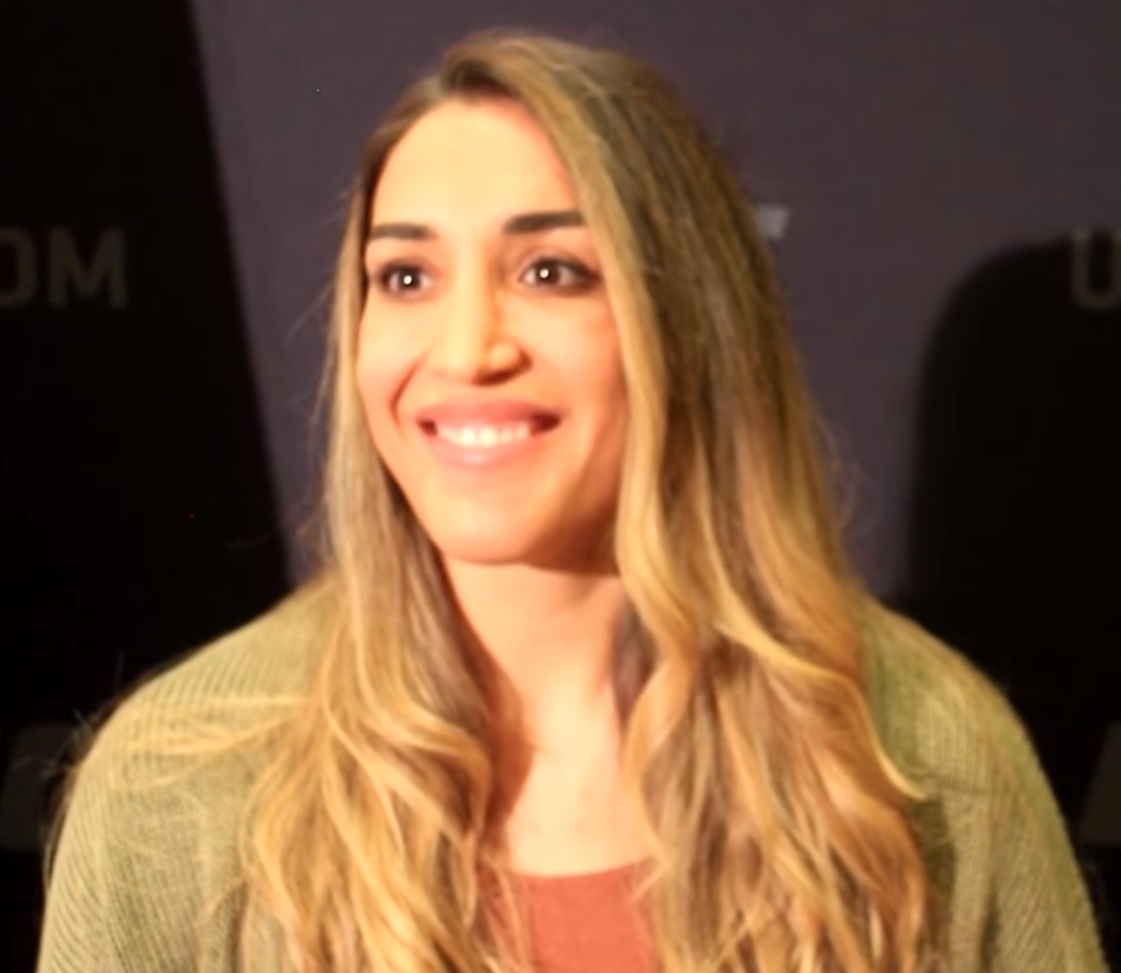
- Suarez interviewed before her bout at UFC 228 in 2018
- Born: Tatiana Yadira Suarez; December 19, 1990 (age 35); Covina, California, U.S.
- Height: 5 ft 5 in (1.65 m)
- Weight: 125 lb (57 kg; 8.9 st)
- Division: Flyweight; Strawweight
- Reach: 66 in (168 cm)
- Style: Wrestling
- Fighting out of: Rancho Cucamonga, California, U.S.
- Team: Millennia MMA Gym
- Rank: Black belt in Brazilian Jiu-Jitsu
- Wrestling: USA Wrestling World Team

Mixed martial arts record
- Total: 14
- Wins: 13
- By knockout: 2
- By submission: 6
- By decision: 5
- Losses: 1
- By decision: 1

Other information
- University: Lindenwood University
- Mixed martial arts record from Sherdog

Tatiana Yadira Suarez Padilla (born December 19, 1990) is an American professional mixed martial artist and former wrestler who currently competes in the women's Strawweight division of the Ultimate Fighting Championship (UFC). She was the strawweight tournament winner in the 23rd season of The Ultimate Fighter reality show. As of November 7, 2026, she is #1 in the Meta UFC women's strawweight rankings, and as of October 17, 2026, she is #8 in the UFC women's pound-for-pound rankings.

In wrestling, Suarez was a multi-time medalist in women's freestyle at the World Championships and World Junior Championships, a silver medalist at the World Cup, and a gold medalist at the Pan American Championships.

== Background ==
Suarez is of Mexican descent. She started wrestling before her fourth birthday, as her older brother wrestled and she insisted that her mother let her wrestle too. She graduated from Northview High School before attending Lindenwood University.

Suarez originally competed under her stepfather's surname, Padilla. In 2007, she placed second at the Junior World Championships, and was named ASICs National High School Wrestler of the Year. In 2008, she won gold at the Pan American Championships followed by bronze at the Junior World Championships in July, another bronze at the World Championships in October, and was named National High School Wrestler of the Year again, the first wrestler to receive it twice. In 2009, Suarez placed fifth at the World Championships. In 2010, she won silver at the World Cup and bronze at the World Championships. In 2011, she was ranked number one freestyle wrestler in the US at 55 kg (121 lb).

While training for the 2012 Summer Olympics in London, Suarez suffered a neck injury, which derailed her Olympic aspirations. An MRI and CAT scan not only revealed a bothersome disc in her neck, but a cancerous growth on her thyroid. Suarez underwent radiation therapy and had her thyroid and several lymph nodes removed. After successful treatment, her thyroid cancer was gone and she eventually began to train again. Suarez started practicing Brazilian jiu-jitsu, which led her to mixed martial arts.

== Mixed martial arts career ==
=== Amateur career ===
Suarez began training in 2013. She had issues finding an opponent for her first fight due to her impressive wrestling background. On the advice of her coaches, she began using Suarez (her biological father's surname) instead of Padilla (her stepfather's surname that she used while wrestling). She made her amateur debut in February 2014 defeating Elizabeth Rodriguez by TKO in the first round. She fought again one month later and defeated Jessica Pryor by unanimous decision.

=== Early professional career ===
Suarez made her professional MMA debut in July 2014 in the Gladiator Challenge promotion defeating Tyra Parker by unanimous decision. She returned in April 2015 and submitted Carolina Alvarez by armbar in the first round. She made her final appearance for the promotion in August 2015 defeating Arline Coban by TKO in the second round. This victory earned her the Gladiator Challenge championship in the California State Championship Series.

=== The Ultimate Fighter 23 ===
Suarez was chosen as a participant on the 23rd season of the reality show The Ultimate Fighter. In her fight to get into the house she defeated Chel-c Bailey by unanimous decision. Her dominant performance caused her to be selected as the number one overall pick by coach Cláudia Gadelha. In the quarter-finals she faced Joanna Jędrzejczyk's number one pick and Invicta FC veteran JJ Aldrich. She submitted Aldrich in the second round by rear naked choke, advancing her to the semi-finals. In her third fight she faced Team Claudia teammate Kate Jackson. She submitted Jackson in the first round by guillotine choke and advanced to the live finale.

=== Ultimate Fighting Championship ===
Suarez faced Team Claudia teammate Amanda Cooper in the finals on July 8, 2016 at The Ultimate Fighter 23 Finale. She won the fight by D'Arce choke in the first round to become the strawweight tournament winner. This win earned her the Performance of the Night bonus.

Suarez was expected to face Juliana Lima at UFC Fight Night 102 on December 9, 2016. However, Suarez pulled out of the fight on November 23 citing injury and was replaced by JJ Aldrich.

Suarez faced Viviane Pereira on November 11, 2017 at UFC Fight Night 120. She won the fight via unanimous decision.

Suarez faced Alexa Grasso on May 19, 2018 at UFC Fight Night 129. She won the fight via a rear-naked choke in round one.

Suarez faced Carla Esparza on September 8, 2018 at UFC 228. She won the fight via technical knockout in the third round.

Suarez faced Nina Ansaroff on June 8, 2019 at UFC 238. She won the fight via unanimous decision.

Suarez was expected to return from an extended hiatus and face Roxanne Modafferi in a flyweight bout on September 25, 2021 at UFC 266. However, Suarez was pulled from the event due to injury, and she was replaced by Taila Santos.

After a three-and-a-half-year hiatus, Suarez returned to face Montana De La Rosa in a flyweight bout on February 25, 2023 at UFC Fight Night 220. She won the fight via a guillotine choke submission in round two. This win earned her the Performance of the Night bonus.

Suarez was scheduled to face Virna Jandiroba on August 5, 2023, at UFC on ESPN 50. However on June 20 it was reported that Jandiroba suffered a knee injury and pulled out of the bout, later replaced by former UFC Women's Strawweight champion Jéssica Andrade. Suarez won the fight via a guillotine choke submission in the second round. This win earned Suarez her third Performance of the Night bonus.

Suarez was scheduled to face Amanda Lemos on February 17, 2024, at UFC 298. However, Suarez was withdrawn from the event because of an injury and was replaced by Mackenzie Dern.

Suarez was scheduled to face Virna Jandiroba on December 7, 2024 at UFC 310. However, Suarez reportedly withdrew from the fight due to an unspecified health issue and the bout was subsequently removed from the card.

Suarez competed for the UFC Women's Strawweight Championship against current two-time champion Zhang Weili on February 9, 2025 at UFC 312. She lost the fight by unanimous decision leading to her first loss in MMA.

Suarez's bout with Amanda Lemos was re-scheduled and took place on September 13, 2025 at UFC Fight Night 259. She won the fight by unanimous decision.

Suarez faced Loopy Godínez on April 11, 2026, at UFC 327. She won the fight via a rear-naked choke submission in the second round.

Suarez ended up facing Virna Jandiroba on November 7, 2026 at UFC Fight Night 293. She won the fight by unanimous decision.

== Popular media ==
In 2024, an HBO documentary, "The Unbreakable Tatiana Suarez" was released. It was based on Suarez's life struggle, fighting with cancer then becoming an MMA fighter.

== Personal life ==
Suarez is engaged to Rizin FF fighter Patchy Mix. They have been in a relationship since 2023.

== Championships and accomplishments ==
=== Freestyle wrestling ===
- United World Wrestling (FILA)
  - World Wrestling Championships
    - 2008 bronze medalist, 55 kg
    - 2010 bronze medalist, 55 kg
  - World Junior Wrestling Championships
    - 2007 silver medalist, 59 kg
    - 2008 bronze medalist, 59 kg
  - World Cup - 2010 silver medalist, 55 kg
  - Pan American Wrestling Championships - 2008 gold medalist, 59 kg

=== Mixed martial arts ===
- Ultimate Fighting Championship
  - The Ultimate Fighter: Team Joanna vs. Team Cláudia Strawweight winner
  - Performance of the Night (Three times) vs. Amanda Cooper, Montana De La Rosa, and Jéssica Andrade
  - Tied (Amanda Lemos, Mackenzie Dern & Rose Namajunas) for second most finishes in UFC Women's Strawweight division history (5)
  - Second most submissions in UFC Women's Strawweight division history (4) (behind Mackenzie Dern)
  - Tied (Carla Esparza, Yan Xiaonan & Loopy Godínez) for the second longest win streak in UFC Women's Strawweight division history (6)
  - Highest significant strike accuracy percentage in UFC Women's Strawweight division history (58.8%)
  - Fewest strikes absorbed-per-minute in UFC Women's Strawweight division history (1.7=63)
  - Highest control time percentage in UFC Women's Strawweight division history (58.9%)
    - Third most control time in UFC Women's Strawweight division history (1:10:40)
  - Second highest top position percentage in UFC Women's Strawweight division history (42.4%)
    - Fifth most top position time in UFC Women's Strawweight division history (50:49)
  - Fifth most takedowns landed in UFC Women's Strawweight division history (32)
- Gladiator Challenge
  - Gladiator Challenge Flyweight Champion (one time)
- MMA Fighting
  - 2023 First Team MMA All-Star
- GiveMeSport
  - 2023 UFC Comeback Fighter of the Year

== Mixed martial arts record ==
Professional record breakdown
14 matches	13 wins	1 loss
By knockout	2	0
By submission	6	0
By decision	5	1

Res.	Record	Opponent	Method	Event	Date	Round	Time	Location	Notes
Win	13–1	Virna Jandiroba	Decision (unanimous)	UFC Fight Night: Cortes-Acosta vs. Walker	November 7, 2026	3	5:00	Las Vegas, Nevada, United States	
Win	12–1	Loopy Godínez	Submission (rear-naked choke)	UFC 327	April 11, 2026	2	2:29	Miami, Florida, United States	
Win	11–1	Amanda Lemos	Decision (unanimous)	UFC Fight Night: Lopes vs. Silva	September 13, 2025	3	5:00	San Antonio, Texas, United States	
Loss	10–1	Zhang Weili	Decision (unanimous)	UFC 312	February 9, 2025	5	5:00	Sydney, Australia	For the UFC Women's Strawweight Championship.
Win	10–0	Jéssica Andrade	Submission (guillotine choke)	UFC on ESPN: Sandhagen vs. Font	August 5, 2023	2	1:31	Nashville, Tennessee, United States	Performance of the Night.
Win	9–0	Montana De La Rosa	Submission (guillotine choke)	UFC Fight Night: Muniz vs. Allen	February 25, 2023	2	2:51	Las Vegas, Nevada, United States	Flyweight bout. Performance of the Night.
Win	8–0	Nina Ansaroff	Decision (unanimous)	UFC 238	June 8, 2019	3	5:00	Chicago, Illinois, United States	
Win	7–0	Carla Esparza	TKO (punches)	UFC 228	September 8, 2018	3	4:33	Dallas, Texas, United States	
Win	6–0	Alexa Grasso	Submission (rear-naked choke)	UFC Fight Night: Maia vs. Usman	May 19, 2018	1	2:44	Santiago, Chile	
Win	5–0	Viviane Pereira	Decision (unanimous)	UFC Fight Night: Poirier vs. Pettis	November 11, 2017	3	5:00	Norfolk, Virginia, United States	
Win	4–0	Amanda Cooper	Submission (brabo choke)	The Ultimate Fighter: Team Joanna vs. Team Cláudia Finale	July 8, 2016	1	3:43	Las Vegas, Nevada, United States	Strawweight debut. Won The Ultimate Fighter 23 Strawweight Tournament. Performance of the Night.
Win	3–0	Arline Coban	TKO (punches)	Gladiator Challenge: California State Championship Series	August 22, 2015	2	0:48	San Jacinto, California, United States	
Win	2–0	Carolina Alvarez	Submission (armbar)	Gladiator Challenge: California State Championship Series	April 11, 2015	1	2:01	San Jacinto, California, United States	
Win	1–0	Tyra Parker	Decision (unanimous)	Gladiator Challenge: Night of the Champions	July 19, 2014	3	5:00	Rancho Mirage, California, United States	Flyweight debut. Won the vacant Gladiator Challenge Flyweight Championship.

Exhibition record breakdown		
3 matches	3 wins	0 losses
By submission	2	0
By decision	1	0

Res.	Record	Opponent	Method	Event	Date	Round	Time	Location	Notes
Win	3–0	Kate Jackson	Submission (guillotine choke)	The Ultimate Fighter: Team Joanna vs. Team Cláudia	July 7, 2016 (airdate)	1	2:52	Las Vegas, Nevada, United States	TUF 23 Semifinal round.
Win	2–0	JJ Aldrich	Submission (rear-naked choke)	The Ultimate Fighter: Team Joanna vs. Team Cláudia	May 3, 2016 (airdate)	2	3:14	Las Vegas, Nevada, United States	TUF 23 Quarterfinal round.
Win	1–0	Chel-c Bailey	Decision (unanimous)	The Ultimate Fighter: Team Joanna vs. Team Cláudia	April 20, 2016 (airdate)	2	5:00	Las Vegas, Nevada, United States	TUF 23 Elimination round.

Amateur record breakdown		
2 matches	2 wins	0 losses
By knockout	1	0
By decision	1	0

Res.	Record	Opponent	Method	Event	Date	Round	Time	Location	Notes
Win	2–0	Jessica Pryor	Decision (unanimous)	Spar Star MMA: Friday Night Fights	March 7, 2014	3	2:00	Inglewood, California, United States	
Win	1–0	Elizabeth Rodriguez	TKO (punches)	Mansion Fights XIV	February 8, 2014	1	1:19	Los Angeles, California, United States	

== Wrestling record ==
2010 World Championships bronze medalist at 55kg
Win	(Russia) Maria Gurova	Fall	September 9, 2010	2010 World Championship	(Russia) Moscow
Win	(South Korea) Um Ji-eun	1–0, 5-4	September 9, 2010	2010 World Championship	(Russia) Moscow
Loss	(Japan) Saori Yoshida	0–3, 0–7	September 9, 2010	2010 World Championship	(Russia) Moscow
Win	(Romania) Ana Maria Pavăl	1–3, 3–3, 6–0	September 9, 2010	2010 World Championship	(Russia) Moscow
Win	(Belarus) Zalina Sidakova	2–0, 7–4	September 9, 2010	2010 World Championship	(Russia) Moscow
2009 World Championships at 55kg
Loss	(Belarus) Alena Filipava	2–5, 0–3	September 24, 2009	2009 World Championships	(Denmark) Herning
Loss	(Azerbaijan) Sona Ahmadli	0–1, 1–2	September 24, 2009	2009 World Championships	(Denmark) Herning
Win	(India) Geeta Phogat	Fall	September 24, 2009	2009 World Championships	(Denmark) Herning
Win	(Norway) Gudrun Høie	3–0, 6–0	September 24, 2009	2009 World Championships	(Denmark) Herning
2008 World Championships bronze medalist at 55kg
Win	(Romania) Ana Maria Pavăl	5–4	October 11, 2008	2008 World Championship	(Japan) Tokyo
Loss	(Ukraine) Tetyana Lazareva	2–5	October 11, 2008	2008 World Championship	(Japan) Tokyo
Win	(Belarus) Tatyana Grigorieva	5–2	October 11, 2008	2008 World Championship	(Japan) Tokyo
Win	(Puerto Rico) Rivera Velazquez	8–1	October 11, 2008	2008 World Championship	(Japan) Tokyo
Win	(Greece) Sofia Poumpouridou	6–1	October 11, 2008	2008 World Championship	(Japan) Tokyo

== See also ==
- List of current UFC fighters
- List of female mixed martial artists
- List of undefeated mixed martial artists
