= 2020 Individual Wrestling World Cup – Women's freestyle 55 kg =

The Women's freestyle 55 kg is a competition featured at the 2020 Individual Wrestling World Cup, and was held in Belgrade, Serbia on 14 and 15 December 2020.

== Medalists ==
Gold	Iryna Kurachkina; Belarus
Silver	Annika Wendle; Germany
Bronze	Olga Khoroshavtseva; Russia
Bronze	Katarzyna Krawczyk; Poland

== Results ==
Legend

- F — Won by fall

Quarterfinals		Semifinals		Final
Olga Khoroshavtseva (RUS)	3
Iryna Kurachkina (BLR)	3	Iryna Kurachkina (BLR)	6
Tetyana Kit (UKR)	1	Pinki (IND)	1
Pinki (IND)	3			Iryna Kurachkina (BLR)	9
Katarzyna Krawczyk (POL)	5			Annika Wendle (GER)	0
Bediha Gün (TUR)	1	Katarzyna Krawczyk (POL)	5
Annika Wendle (GER)	9	Annika Wendle (GER)	6
Mariana Drăguțan (MDA)	2

Bronze medals
Olga Khoroshavtseva (RUS)	10
Pinki (IND)	0
Mariana Drăguțan (MDA)	0
Katarzyna Krawczyk (POL)	7
