= Sumiyaa =

Sumiyaa (Mongolian: Сумъяа) is a Mongolian given name. Notable people with the name include:

- Dorjsürengiin Sumiyaa (born 1992), Mongolian judoka
- Erdenechimegiin Sumiyaa (born 1990), Mongolian wrestler
