= 2015 World Wrestling Championships – Women's freestyle 55 kg =

Women's freestyle 55 kg at the 2015 World Championships
- Venue: Orleans Arena
- Dates: 10 September 2015
- Competitors: 16 from 16 nations

Medalists
gold medal	Helen Maroulis	United States
silver medal	Irina Ologonova	Russia
bronze medal	Evelina Nikolova	Bulgaria
bronze medal	Tetyana Kit	Ukraine

The women's freestyle 55 kilograms is a competition featured at the 2015 World Wrestling Championships, and was held in Las Vegas, United States on 10 September 2015.

This freestyle wrestling competition consisted of a single-elimination tournament, with a repechage used to determine the winners of two bronze medals. The two finalists faced off for gold and silver medals. Each wrestler who lost to one of the two finalists moved into the repechage, culminating in a pair of bronze medal matches featuring the semifinal losers each facing the remaining repechage opponent from their half of the bracket.

Each bout consists of a single round within a six-minute limit including two halves of three minutes. The wrestler who scores more points is the winner.

The American Helen Maroulis won the gold medal after dominating Irina Ologonova from Russia in the final, beating her by technical superiority 11–0. Evelina Nikolova of Bulgaria and Tetyana Kit from Ukraine shared the bronze medals. Nikolova pinned Pang of China and Kit beat Hanchar from Belarus 5–0.

== Results ==
Legend

- F — Won by fall

=== Main bracket ===
Round of 16
Bediha Gün (TUR)	4
Evelina Nikolova (BUL)	4^{F}
Helen Maroulis (USA)	10
Brenda Fernández (MEX)	0
Marwa Amri (TUN)	9
Sündeviin Byambatseren (MGL)	8
Pang Qianyu (CHN)	10
Nataliya Synyshyn (AZE)	0
Aizhan Ismagulova (KAZ)	2
Katsiaryna Hanchar (BLR)	4^{F}
Lalita Sehrawat (IND)	0
Anri Kimura (JPN)	7^{F}
Tetyana Kit (UKR)	0
Irina Ologonova (RUS)	4
Jasmine Mian (CAN)	5
Anna Zwirydowska (POL)	2

Quarterfinals
Evelina Nikolova (BUL)	0
Helen Maroulis (USA)	8^{F}
Marwa Amri (TUN)	0
Pang Qianyu (CHN)	11
Katsiaryna Hanchar (BLR)	5
Anri Kimura (JPN)	2
Irina Ologonova (RUS)	4
Jasmine Mian (CAN)	0

Semifinals
Helen Maroulis (USA)	5
Pang Qianyu (CHN)	0
Katsiaryna Hanchar (BLR)	0
Irina Ologonova (RUS)	7

Final
Helen Maroulis (USA)	11
Irina Ologonova (RUS)	0

=== Repechage ===
Repechage round 1
Brenda Fernández (MEX)	4
Evelina Nikolova (BUL)	5^{F}
Tetyana Kit (UKR)	8^{F}
Jasmine Mian (CAN)	0

Bronze medals
Evelina Nikolova (BUL)	4^{F}
Pang Qianyu (CHN)	7
Tetyana Kit (UKR)	5
Katsiaryna Hanchar (BLR)	0
