= Chiho Hamada =

Japanese freestyle wrestler

Personal information
- Nationality: Japanese
- Born: November 17, 1992 (age 33) Kanagawa Prefecture, Japan
- Height: 1.60 m (5 ft 3 in)
- Weight: 55 kg (121 lb)

Sport
- Sport: Sport wrestling
- Event: Freestyle
Medal record
Women's freestyle wrestling
Representing Japan
FILA Wrestling World Championships
Gold medal – first place	2014 Tashkent	-55 kg
Golden Grand Prix Ivan Yarygin
Silver medal – second place	2016 Krasnoyarsk	53 kg

Chiho Hamada (浜田 千穂, Hamada, Chiho; born November 17, 1992) is a freestyle wrestler from Japan who won the world title in the 55 kg division in 2014.

== Championships and accomplishments ==
- Tokyo Sports
  - Wrestling Special Award (2014)
