= 2017 World Wrestling Championships – Women's freestyle 53 kg =

Women's freestyle 53 kg at the 2017 World Championships
- Venue: AccorHotels Arena
- Dates: 24 August 2017
- Competitors: 25 from 25 nations

Medalists
gold medal	Vanesa Kaladzinskaya	Belarus
silver medal	Mayu Mukaida	Japan
bronze medal	Maria Prevolaraki	Greece
bronze medal	Roksana Zasina	Poland

The women's freestyle 53 kilograms is a competition featured at the 2017 World Wrestling Championships, and was held in Paris, France on 24 August 2017.

This freestyle wrestling competition consisted of a single-elimination tournament, with a repechage used to determine the winners of two bronze medals.

== Results ==
Legend

- F — Won by fall

=== Final ===
Final
Vanesa Kaladzinskaya (BLR)	8
Mayu Mukaida (JPN)	6

=== Top half ===
Round of 32
Estera Dobre (ROU)	3
Kim Hyung-joo (KOR)	0

Round of 16
Maria Prevolaraki (GRE)	5^{F}
Aigul Nuralim (KAZ)	0
Vanesa Kaladzinskaya (BLR)	10
Iulia Leorda (MDA)	0
Sheetal Tomar (IND)	10
Jessica Lavers-McBain (AUS)	0
Maroi Mezien (TUN)	0
Estera Dobre (ROU)	10

Quarterfinals
Maria Prevolaraki (GRE)	4
Vanesa Kaladzinskaya (BLR)	6
Sheetal Tomar (IND)	2
Estera Dobre (ROU)	4

Semifinals
Vanesa Kaladzinskaya (BLR)	8^{F}
Estera Dobre (ROU)	2

=== Bottom half ===
Round of 32
Davaasükhiin Otgontsetseg (MGL)	8
Nina Hemmer (GER)	6
Jessica MacDonald (CAN)	0
Stalvira Orshush (RUS)	10
Iryna Husyak (UKR)	10
Nadia Trujillano (PER)	0
Pak Yong-mi (PRK)	2
Mayu Mukaida (JPN)	6
Tatiana Debien (FRA)	6
Luo Lannuan (CHN)	8
Haley Augello (USA)	10
Vũ Thị Hằng (VIE)	0
Carolina Castillo (COL)	0
Roksana Zasina (POL)	7
Leyla Gurbanova (AZE)	10
Sümeyye Sezer Zeybek (TUR)	0

Round of 16
Davaasükhiin Otgontsetseg (MGL)	0
Stalvira Orshush (RUS)	10
Iryna Husyak (UKR)	2
Mayu Mukaida (JPN)	12
Luo Lannuan (CHN)	0
Haley Augello (USA)	3
Roksana Zasina (POL)	3
Leyla Gurbanova (AZE)	1

Quarterfinals
Stalvira Orshush (RUS)	0
Mayu Mukaida (JPN)	5
Haley Augello (USA)	2
Roksana Zasina (POL)	8

Semifinals
Mayu Mukaida (JPN)	5
Roksana Zasina (POL)	1

=== Repechage ===
Repechage round 1
Pak Yong-mi (PRK)	8
Iryna Husyak (UKR)	2

Repechage round 2
Iulia Leorda (MDA)	1
Maria Prevolaraki (GRE)	3
Pak Yong-mi (PRK)	4
Stalvira Orshush (RUS)	2

Bronze medals
Maria Prevolaraki (GRE)	2^{F}
Estera Dobre (ROU)	1
Pak Yong-mi (PRK)	2
Roksana Zasina (POL)	4
