= Becka Leathers =

American freestyle wrestler (born 1996)

Personal information
- Nationality: American
- Born: November 19, 1996 (age 29)
- Education: Grays Harbor

Sport
- Sport: Wrestling
Medal record
Women's freestyle wrestling
Representing United States
World Wrestling Championships
Bronze medal – third place	2017	55 kg weight class
Pan American Championships
Gold medal – first place	2017	55 kg weight class

Becka Anne Leathers (born November 19, 1996) is an American freestyle wrestler from Choctaw, Oklahoma.

== Domestic career ==
In her youth, she was a multi-time national champion, including cadet and junior national champion.

In college, she was a WCWA national champion as a freshman at Oklahoma City University

== International career ==
Leathers was a gold medalist at the 2017 Pan American Championships. Later that year, she was a bronze medalist at the 2017 World Wrestling Championships in the 55 kg weight class.

Leathers's other wins include the Dave Schultz Memorial, University Nationals, U.S. World Team Trials, Pan American Championships, and the Grand Prix of Spain.

She went on to coach at Beat The Streets before heading back to Choctaw, Oklahoma.
