= 2016 European Wrestling Championships – Women's freestyle 53 kg =

The women's freestyle 53 kg is a competition featured at the 2016 European Wrestling Championships, and was held in Riga, Latvia on March 9.

== Medalists ==
Gold	Sofia Mattsson; Sweden
Silver	Iryna Kurachkina; Belarus
Bronze	Nina Hemmer; Germany
Bronze	Yuliya Blahinya; Ukraine

== Results ==
Legend

- F — Won by fall

=== Top half ===
==== Section 1 ====
Round of 16
Sofia Mattsson (SWE)	6^{F}
Mercedesz Denes (HUN)	0
Estera Dobre (ROM)	6
Liubov Salnikova (RUS)	4
Bilyana Dudova (BUL)	4
Bediha Gun (TUR)	2
Anzhela Dorogan (AZE)	2
Nina Hemmer (GER)	5
Francesca Mori (ITA)	0
Natalia Budu (MDA)	6^{F}
Paula Kozlow (POL)	6
Violeta Ponomarjova (LAT)	2
Karima Sanchez Ramis (ESP)	10
Tiina Ylinen (FIN)	0
Yuliya Blahinya (UKR)	4
Iryna Kurachkina (BLR)	7

Quarterfinals
Sofia Mattsson (SWE)	2^{F}
Estera Dobre (ROM)	0
Bilyana Dudova (BUL)	0
Nina Hemmer (GER)	12
Natalia Budu (MDA)	4^{F}
Paula Kozlow (POL)	2
Karima Sanchez Ramis (ESP)	2
Iryna Kurachkina (BLR)	12^{F}

Semifinals
Sofia Mattsson (SWE)	8^{F}
Nina Hemmer (GER)	0
Natalia Budu (MDA)	2
Iryna Kurachkina (BLR)	7

Final
Sofia Mattsson (SWE)	4^{F}
Iryna Kurachkina (BLR)	0

=== Repechage ===
Repechage round 2
Mercedesz Denes (HUN)	0
Estera Dobre (ROM)	6^{F}
Yuliya Blahinya (UKR)	12
Karima Sanchez Ramis (ESP)	11

Bronze medals
Estera Dobre (ROM)	4
Nina Hemmer (GER)	6^{F}
Yuliya Blahinya (UKR)	5
Natalia Budu (MDA)	2
