= 2020 Individual Wrestling World Cup – Women's freestyle 53 kg =

The Women's freestyle 53 kg is a competition featured at the 2020 Individual Wrestling World Cup, and was held in Belgrade, Serbia on 14 and 15 December 2020.

== Medalists ==
Gold	Maria Prevolaraki; Greece
Silver	Roksana Zasina; Poland
Bronze	Zalina Sidakova; Belarus
Bronze	Anzhelika Vetoshkina; Russia

== Results ==
Legend

- F — Won by fall

1/8 finals
Zeynep Yetgil (TUR)	2
Hilary Honorine (FRA)	0
Anzhelika Vetoshkina (RUS)	3
Roksana Zasina (POL)	5
Sezen Belberova (BUL)	4
Marina Rueda (ESP)	0
Thalía Mallqui (PER)	2
Nina Hemmer (GER)	12
Khrystyna-Zoryana Demko (UKR)	0
Iulia Leorda (MDA)	8

Quarterfinals
Emanuela Liuzzi (ITA)	0
Zalina Sidakova (BLR)	11
Maria Prevolaraki (GRE)	4
Zeynep Yetgil (TUR)	0
Roksana Zasina (POL)	2
Sezen Belberova (BUL)	0
Nina Hemmer (GER)	6
Iulia Leorda (MDA)	2

Semifinals
Zalina Sidakova (BLR)	0
Maria Prevolaraki (GRE)	4
Roksana Zasina (POL)	5
Nina Hemmer (GER)	2

Final
Maria Prevolaraki (GRE)	5
Roksana Zasina (POL)	1

Repechage round 1
Anzhelika Vetoshkina (RUS)	10
Sezen Belberova (BUL)	0

Bronze medals
Zeynep Yetgil (TUR)	0
Zalina Sidakova (BLR)	3
Anzhelika Vetoshkina (RUS)	12
Nina Hemmer (GER)	4
