= 2013 World Wrestling Championships – Women's freestyle 59 kg =

Women's freestyle 59 kg at the 2013 World Championships
- Venue: László Papp Budapest Sports Arena
- Dates: 19 September 2013
- Competitors: 25 from 25 nations

Medalists
gold medal	Marianna Sastin	Hungary
silver medal	Taybe Yusein	Bulgaria
bronze medal	Tungalagiin Mönkhtuyaa	Mongolia
bronze medal	Yuliya Ratkevich	Azerbaijan

The women's freestyle 59 kilograms is a competition featured at the 2013 World Wrestling Championships, and was held at the László Papp Budapest Sports Arena in Budapest, Hungary on 19 September 2013.

This freestyle wrestling competition consisted of a single-elimination tournament, with a repechage used to determine the winners of two bronze medals.

== Results ==
Legend

- F — Won by fall
- WO — Won by walkover

=== Final ===
Final
Marianna Sastin (HUN)	8
Taybe Yusein (BUL)	2

=== Top half ===
Round of 32
Ayaka Ito (JPN)	11^{F}
Sayuri Cañón (COL)	3

Round of 16
Anna Zwirydowska (POL)	2
Tungalagiin Mönkhtuyaa (MGL)	4
Marianna Sastin (HUN)	9
Hou Min-wen (TPE)	0
Alli Ragan (USA)	8^{F}
Svetlana Lipatova (RUS)	0
Ayaulym Kassymova (KAZ)	0
Ayaka Ito (JPN)	7

Quarterfinals
Tungalagiin Mönkhtuyaa (MGL)	0
Marianna Sastin (HUN)	7
Alli Ragan (USA)	2
Ayaka Ito (JPN)	3

Semifinals
Marianna Sastin (HUN)	4^{F}
Ayaka Ito (JPN)	0

=== Bottom half ===
Round of 32
Nadzeya Mikhalkova (BLR)	0
Joice Silva (BRA)	7
Yaquelin Estornell (CUB)	3
Georgiana Paic (ROU)	2
Geeta Phogat (IND)	3
Yuliya Ratkevich (AZE)	4^{F}
Phạm Thị Loan (VIE)	8^{F}
Martina Riegler (AUT)	2
Taybe Yusein (BUL)	5
Tetyana Lavrenchuk (UKR)	0
Yang Chen (CHN)	4
Braxton Papadopoulos (CAN)	2^{F}
Mirna Henríquez (VEN)	1
Aisuluu Tynybekova (KGZ)	8
Karima Sánchez (ESP)	5^{F}
Hela Riabi (TUN)	0

Round of 16
Joice Silva (BRA)	4
Yaquelin Estornell (CUB)	2
Yuliya Ratkevich (AZE)	4^{F}
Phạm Thị Loan (VIE)	0
Taybe Yusein (BUL)	3^{F}
Braxton Papadopoulos (CAN)	0
Aisuluu Tynybekova (KGZ)	12
Karima Sánchez (ESP)	3

Quarterfinals
Joice Silva (BRA)	0
Yuliya Ratkevich (AZE)	8
Taybe Yusein (BUL)	10
Aisuluu Tynybekova (KGZ)	2

Semifinals
Yuliya Ratkevich (AZE)	0
Taybe Yusein (BUL)	5^{F}

=== Repechage ===
Repechage round 1
Tetyana Lavrenchuk (UKR)	WO
Braxton Papadopoulos (CAN)

Repechage round 2
Hou Min-wen (TPE)	2
Tungalagiin Mönkhtuyaa (MGL)	10
Tetyana Lavrenchuk (UKR)	4^{F}
Aisuluu Tynybekova (KGZ)	0

Bronze medals
Tungalagiin Mönkhtuyaa (MGL)	7^{F}
Ayaka Ito (JPN)	2
Tetyana Lavrenchuk (UKR)	4
Yuliya Ratkevich (AZE)	7
