= 2021 World Wrestling Championships – Women's freestyle 57 kg =

Wrestling competitions

Women's freestyle 57 kg at the 2021 World Championships
- Venue: Nye Jordal Amfi
- Dates: 6–7 October 2021
- Competitors: 17 from 17 nations

Medalists
gold medal	Helen Maroulis	United States
silver medal	Anshu Malik	India
bronze medal	Sae Nanjo	Japan
bronze medal	Erkhembayaryn Davaachimeg	Mongolia

The women's freestyle 57 kilograms is a competition featured at the 2021 World Wrestling Championships, and was held in Oslo, Norway on 6 and 7 October.

This freestyle wrestling competition consists of a single-elimination tournament, with a repechage used to determine the winner of two bronze medals. The two finalists face off for gold and silver medals. Each wrestler who loses to one of the two finalists moves into the repechage, culminating in a pair of bronze medal matches featuring the semifinal losers each facing the remaining repechage opponent from their half of the bracket.

== Results ==
Legend

- F — Won by fall

=== Final ===
Final
Helen Maroulis (USA)	4^{F}
Anshu Malik (IND)	1

=== Top half ===
Round of 32

Round of 16
Evelina Nikolova (BUL)	10
Yuliya Pisarenka (BLR)	0
Sae Nanjo (JPN)	9
Alma Valencia (MEX)	4
Veronika Chumikova (RWF)	5
Patrycja Gil (POL)	1
Jeannie Kessler (AUT)	0
Helen Maroulis (USA)	5^{F}

Quarterfinals
Evelina Nikolova (BUL)	2
Sae Nanjo (JPN)	11^{F}
Veronika Chumikova (RWF)	1
Helen Maroulis (USA)	10

Semifinals
Sae Nanjo (JPN)	4
Helen Maroulis (USA)	6

=== Bottom half ===
Round of 32
Nilufar Raimova (KAZ)	6
Elena Brugger (GER)	2

Round of 16
Giullia Penalber (BRA)	4^{F}
Sophia Ayieta (KEN)	0
Solomiia Vynnyk (UKR)	7^{F}
Alexandria Town (CAN)	9
Erkhembayaryn Davaachimeg (MGL)	11
Elvira Kamaloğlu (TUR)	0
Nilufar Raimova (KAZ)	5
Anshu Malik (IND)	15

Quarterfinals
Giullia Penalber (BRA)	10
Solomiia Vynnyk (UKR)	12
Erkhembayaryn Davaachimeg (MGL)	1
Anshu Malik (IND)	5

Semifinals
Solomiia Vynnyk (UKR)	0
Anshu Malik (IND)	11

=== Repechage ===
Repechage round 2
Jeannie Kessler (AUT)	0
Veronika Chumikova (RWF)	10
Nilufar Raimova (KAZ)	0
Erkhembayaryn Davaachimeg (MGL)	10

Bronze medals
Veronika Chumikova (RWF)	3
Sae Nanjo (JPN)	7
Erkhembayaryn Davaachimeg (MGL)	11
Solomiia Vynnyk (UKR)	8

== Final standing ==
Rank	Athlete
1st place, gold medalist(s)	Helen Maroulis (USA)
2nd place, silver medalist(s)	Anshu Malik (IND)
3rd place, bronze medalist(s)	Sae Nanjo (JPN)
3rd place, bronze medalist(s)	Erkhembayaryn Davaachimeg (MGL)
5	Veronika Chumikova (RWF)
5	Solomiia Vynnyk (UKR)
7	Giullia Penalber (BRA)
8	Evelina Nikolova (BUL)
9	Nilufar Raimova (KAZ)
10	Alma Valencia (MEX)
11	Elena Brugger (GER)
12	Patrycja Gil (POL)
13	Alexandria Town (CAN)
14	Sophia Ayieta (KEN)
15	Yuliya Pisarenka (BLR)
16	Elvira Kamaloğlu (TUR)
17	Jeannie Kessler (AUT)
