= Sian Law =

New Zealand wrestler

Sian Eileen Law (later Beardsmore, born 1981) is a wrestler from New Zealand.

In 2010 Law competed at the World Wrestling Championships in Russia, in the women's freestyle 55 kg category.

Law represented New Zealand at the 2010 Commonwealth Games; she was the first female wrestler New Zealand had selected for a Commonwealth Games. Law works in ICT for the New Zealand Police and later the same year she was the recipient of the New Zealand Police Association Sportsperson of the Year Award.

Law became a wrestling coach in Tawa, Wellington, and coached Olivia Bareta-Rodgers, who won two gold medals at the national wrestling championships in 2017.
