= Alma Valencia =

Mexican freestyle wrestler

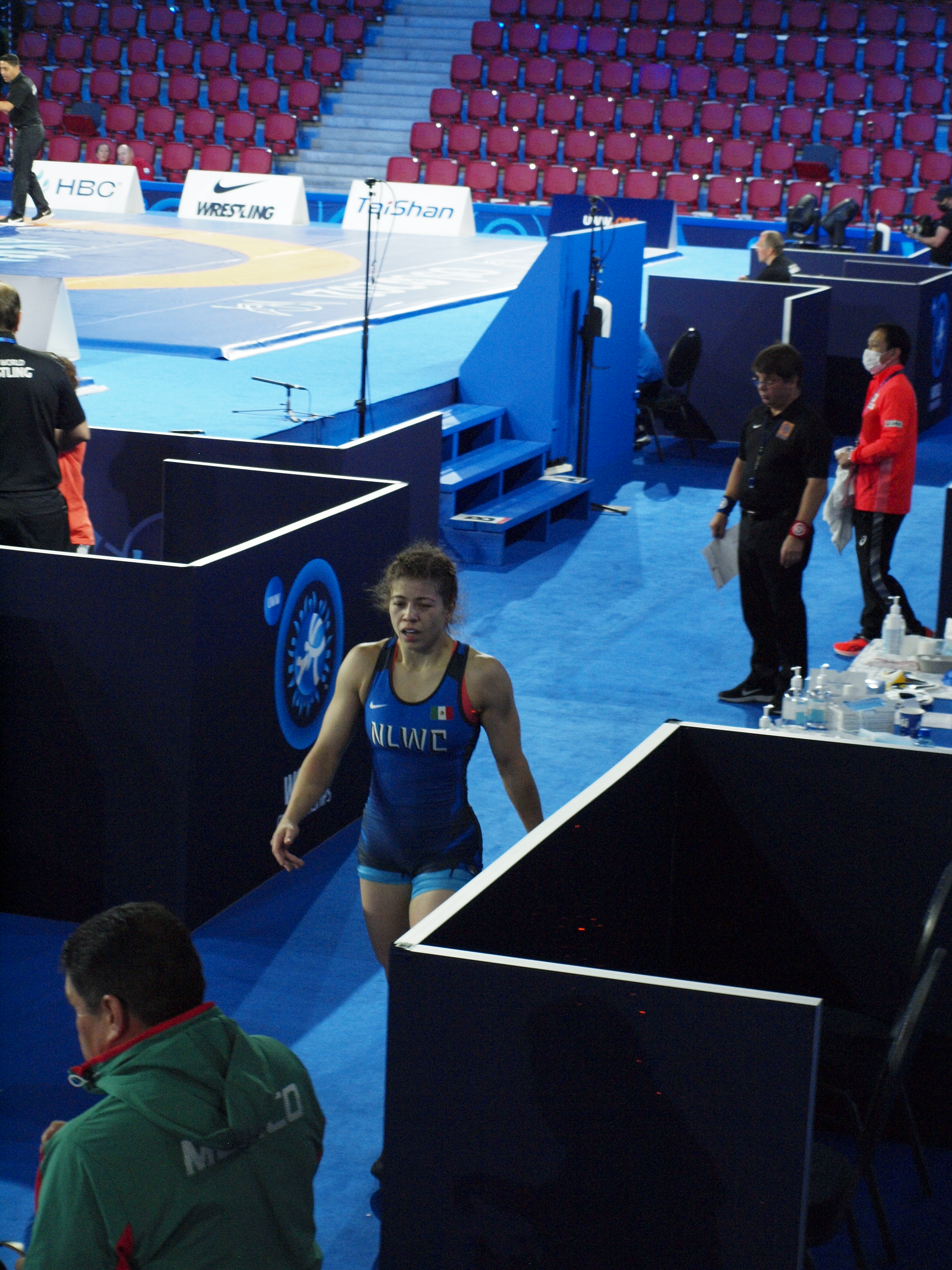
- Valencia at the 2021 World Championships

Personal information
- Full name: Alma Jane Valencia Escoto
- Born: 18 October 1990 (age 35) Zapopan, Jalisco, Mexico
- Height: 1.60 m (5 ft 3 in)

Sport
- Sport: Wrestling
- Event: Freestyle
Medal record
Women's freestyle wrestling
Representing Mexico
Pan American Games
Silver medal – second place	2015 Toronto	55 kg
Pan American Championships
Bronze medal – third place	Monterrey 2010	55 kg
Bronze medal – third place	Rionegro 2011	55 kg
Bronze medal – third place	Panama 2013	55 kg
Central American and Caribbean Games
Gold medal – first place	Veracruz 2014	53 kg
Silver medal – second place	Mayagüez 2010	55 kg

Alma Jane Valencia Escoto (born 18 October 1990), also known as Jane Valencia or Alma Valencia, is a Mexican freestyle wrestler. In the 55 kg category, she won the silver medal at the 2015 Pan American Games, having finished seventh in 2011. She won three bronze medals at the Pan American Wrestling Championships in 2010, 2011 and 2013. She also won a silver and gold medal at the 2010 and 2014 Central American and Caribbean Games respectively, both in the 55 kg category.

Valencia qualified for the 2020 Summer Olympics in the women's freestyle 57 kg category at the 2020 Pan American Qualification Tournament in Ottawa, Canada.

In October 2021, she was eliminated in her first match in the women's 57 kg event at the 2021 World Wrestling Championships in Oslo, Norway.

Valencia won the silver medal in her event at the 2022 Pan American Wrestling Championships held in Acapulco, Mexico. She competed at the 2024 Pan American Wrestling Olympic Qualification Tournament held in Acapulco, Mexico hoping to qualify for the 2024 Summer Olympics in Paris, France. She was eliminated in her second match by Hannah Taylor of Canada.

== Academic/Professional life ==
Valencia is a medical doctor, who studied in Mexico, USA and Puerto Rico, graduating from Mexico's Guadalajara Lamar Universidad medical school in the spring of 2019.

== Personal life ==
Valencia is in a relationship with Puerto Rican wrestler Jaime Espinal. Their first daughter Joy Espinal Valencia was born on 31 May 2017.
