= Anzhelika Vetoshkina =

Russian freestyle wrestler

Personal information
- Full name: Anzhelika Aristakovna Vetoshkina
- Nationality: Russian (Russia)
- Born: 5 December 1994 (age 31) Izhevsk, Udmurtia, Russia
- Height: 153 cm (5 ft 0 in)
- Weight: 53 kg (117 lb)

Sport
- Country: Russia
- Sport: Amateur wrestling
- Event: Freestyle
Medal record
Women's freestyle wrestling
Representing Russia
Individual World Cup
Bronze medal – third place	2020 Belgrade	53 kg
Golden Grand Prix Ivan Yarygin
Silver medal – second place	2019 Krasnoyarsk	50 kg
Bronze medal – third place	2018 Krasnoyarsk	50 kg
Bronze medal – third place	2020 Krasnoyarsk	50 kg

Anzhelika Vetoshkina (born 5 December 1994) is a female Russian freestyle wrestler of Udmurt heritage.

In 2018, Vetoshkina won one of the bronze medals in the women's 50 kg event at the Klippan Lady Open in Klippan, Sweden. In the same year, she also competed in the women's freestyle 50 kg event at the 2018 World Wrestling Championships held in Budapest, Hungary. She was eliminated in her second match by Sun Yanan of China.

In 2019, Vetoshkina competed in the women's freestyle 50 kg event at the 2019 European Games held in Minsk, Belarus. She was eliminated in her first match by Miglena Selishka of Bulgaria.

In 2020, she won one of the bronze medals in the women's 53 kg event at the 2020 Individual Wrestling World Cup held in Belgrade, Serbia.

In 2022, she competed at the Yasar Dogu Tournament held in Istanbul, Turkey.
