= 2012 World Wrestling Championships =

- Host city: Strathcona County, Canada
- Dates: 27–29 September 2012
- Stadium: Millennium Place

Champions
- Women: China

The 2012 Women's World Wrestling Championships was held at Millennium Place in Strathcona County, Alberta, Canada. Traditionally, Wrestling World Championships are not held in Olympic years, but in 2012 a female championship was held because the 2012 Summer Olympics included only four of the seven FILA weight classes for females.

== Medal table ==
Rank	Nation	Gold	Silver	Bronze	Total
1	United States	2	1	1	4
2	China	1	1	4	6
3	Belarus	1	1	1	3
3	Canada	1	1	1	3
3	Japan	1	1	1	3
6	Sweden	1	0	0	1
7	Bulgaria	0	1	0	1
7	Kazakhstan	0	1	0	1
9	India	0	0	2	2
10	Germany	0	0	1	1
10	Great Britain	0	0	1	1
10	Greece	0	0	1	1
10	Mongolia	0	0	1	1
Totals (13 entries)		7	7	14	28

== Team ranking ==
Rank	Women's freestyle	
Rank	Team	Points
1	China	54
2	Japan	43
3	United States	40
4	Canada	35
5	Kazakhstan	31
6	Belarus	28
7	India	28
8	Azerbaijan	22
9	Ukraine	18
10	Russia	16

== Medal summary ==
Event	Gold	Silver	Bronze
48 kg	Vanesa Kaladzinskaya; Belarus	Eri Tosaka; Japan	Li Xiaomei; China
48 kg	Vanesa Kaladzinskaya; Belarus	Eri Tosaka; Japan	Jaqueline Schellin; Germany
51 kg	Jessica MacDonald; Canada	Sun Yanan; China	Babita Kumari; India
51 kg	Jessica MacDonald; Canada	Sun Yanan; China	Alyssa Lampe; United States
55 kg	Saori Yoshida; Japan	Helen Maroulis; United States	Geeta Phogat; India
55 kg	Saori Yoshida; Japan	Helen Maroulis; United States	Maria Prevolaraki; Greece
59 kg	Zhang Lan; China	Zalina Sidakova; Belarus	Tungalagiin Mönkhtuyaa; Mongolia
59 kg	Zhang Lan; China	Zalina Sidakova; Belarus	Olga Butkevych; Great Britain
63 kg	Elena Pirozhkova; United States	Taybe Yusein; Bulgaria	Justine Bouchard; Canada
63 kg	Elena Pirozhkova; United States	Taybe Yusein; Bulgaria	Xiluo Zhuoma; China
67 kg	Adeline Gray; United States	Dorothy Yeats; Canada	Hong Yan; China
67 kg	Adeline Gray; United States	Dorothy Yeats; Canada	Yoshiko Inoue; Japan
72 kg	Jenny Fransson; Sweden	Guzel Manyurova; Kazakhstan	Vasilisa Marzaliuk; Belarus
72 kg	Jenny Fransson; Sweden	Guzel Manyurova; Kazakhstan	Xu Qing; China

== Participating nations ==
111 competitors from 28 nations participated.

- Azerbaijan (7)
- Belarus (7)
- Brazil (2)
- Bulgaria (2)
- Canada (7)
- China (7)
- Chinese Taipei (2)
- Czech Republic (2)
- Estonia (1)
- France (2)
- Germany (3)
- Great Britain (1)
- Greece (2)
- India (7)
- Israel (1)
- Japan (7)
- Kazakhstan (7)
- Latvia (1)
- Mexico (1)
- Mongolia (7)
- Poland (4)
- Romania (3)
- Russia (7)
- Slovakia (1)
- Sweden (2)
- Turkey (4)
- Ukraine (7)
- United States (7)

== See also ==
- Wrestling at the 2012 Summer Olympics
