= Erdenechimegiin Sumiyaa =

Mongolian sport wrestler

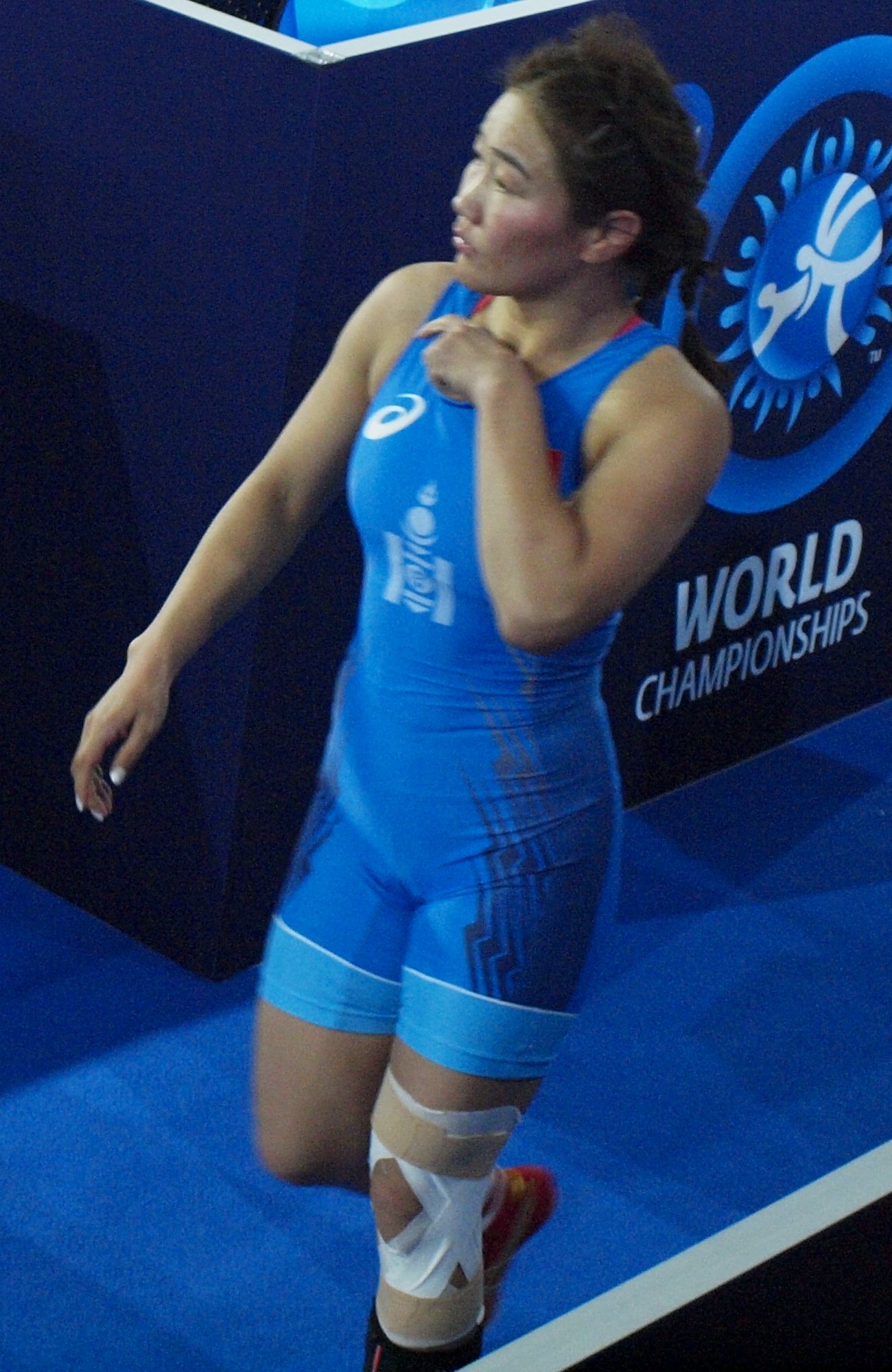
- 2021 World Wrestling Championships

Personal information
- Native name: Эрдэнэчимэгийн Сумьяа
- Born: 28 February 1990 (age 36) Arkhangai, Mongolia
- Height: 159 cm (5 ft 3 in)

Sport
- Country: Mongolia
- Sport: Wrestling
- Weight class: 53-55 kg
- Event: Freestyle

Achievements and titles
- World finals: (silver) (2013)
- Regional finals: (silver) (2018)
Medal record
Women's freestyle wrestling
Representing Mongolia
World Championships
Silver medal – second place	2013 Budapest	51 kg
World Cup
Bronze medal – third place	2018 Takasaki	53 kg
Bronze medal – third place	2017 Cheboksary	53 kg
Bronze medal – third place	2015 St.Petersburg	53 kg
Asian Games
Bronze medal – third place	2018 Jakarta	53 kg
Asian Championships
Silver medal – second place	2018 Bishkek	53 kg
Summer Universiade
Silver medal – second place	2013 Kazan	51 kg
Golden Grand Prix Ivan Yarygin
Silver medal – second place	2020 Krasnoyarsk	53 kg
Bronze medal – third place	2015 Krasnoyarsk	53 kg
Bronze medal – third place	2016 Krasnoyarsk	53 kg
Bronze medal – third place	2017 Krasnoyarsk	53 kg
Bronze medal – third place	2022 Krasnoyarsk	55 kg
Representing Russia
Poddubny wrestling league
Bronze medal – third place	2022 Moscow	55 kg

Erdenechimegiin Sumiyaa (born 28 February 1990) is a wrestler from Mongolia. At the 2013 FILA Wrestling World Championships, she won a silver medal in women's 51 kg freestyle.

In 2021, she won the silver medal in the women's 55 kg event at the 2021 Poland Open held in Warsaw, Poland. In 2022, she won one of the bronze medals in the women's 55 kg event at the Golden Grand Prix Ivan Yarygin held in Krasnoyarsk, Russia.
