= Zhang Lan (wrestler) =

Chinese sport wrestler (born 1990)

Medal record

Women's freestyle wrestling

Representing China

World Championships
Gold medal – first place	2012 Strathcona County	59 kg
Silver medal – second place	2010 Moscow	59 kg

Zhang Lan (born October 18, 1990) is a female wrestler from China.
