= Iryna Kurachkina =

Belarusian freestyle wrestler

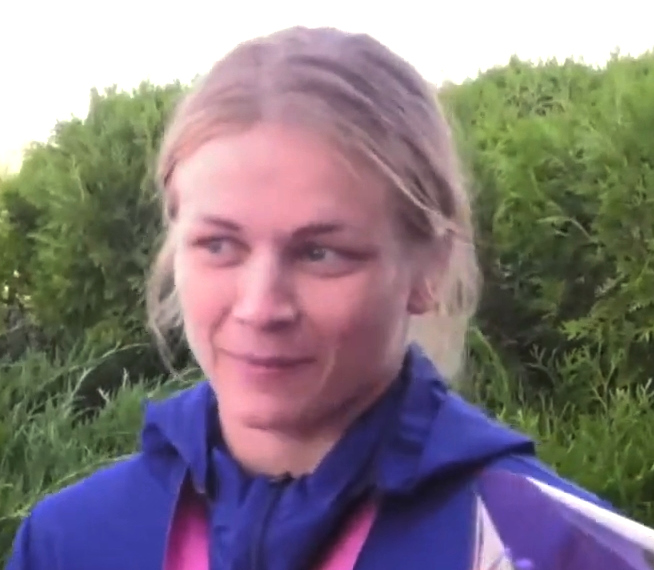
- Kurachkina in 2021

Personal information
- Born: 17 June 1994 (age 32) Kruhlaye, Belarus

Sport
- Country: Belarus
- Sport: Amateur wrestling
- Weight class: 57 kg
- Event: Freestyle
Medal record
Women's freestyle wrestling
Representing United World Wrestling
Grand Prix
Bronze medal – third place	2025 Budapest	53 kg
Representing Individual Neutral Athletes
World Championships
Bronze medal – third place	2024 Tirana	55 kg
European Championships
Gold medal – first place	2024 Bucharest	57 kg
Representing Belarus
Olympic Games
Silver medal – second place	2020 Tokyo	57 kg
World Championships
Bronze medal – third place	2017 Paris	55 kg
Bronze medal – third place	2019 Nur-Sultan	57 kg
Bronze medal – third place	2026 Astana	57 kg
European Championships
Gold medal – first place	2018 Kaspiysk	55 kg
Gold medal – first place	2021 Warsaw	57 kg
Silver medal – second place	2016 Riga	53 kg
Bronze medal – third place	2020 Rome	57 kg
Individual World Cup
Gold medal – first place	2020 Belgrade	55 kg
European Games
Gold medal – first place	2019 Minsk	57 kg
Yasar Dogu Tournament
Bronze medal – third place	2022 Istanbul	57 kg
World U23 Championships
Silver medal – second place	2017 Bydgoszcz	55 kg

Iryna Alyaksandrauna Kurachkina (Belarusian: Ірына Аляксандраўна Курачкіна; born 17 June 1994) is a Belarusian freestyle wrestler. She won the silver medal in the women's 57 kg event at the 2020 Summer Olympics held in Tokyo, Japan. Kurachkina is also a three-time bronze medalist at the World Wrestling Championships and a five-time medalist, including three golds, at the European Wrestling Championships. She also won the gold medal in her event at the 2019 European Games held in Minsk, Belarus.

== Career ==
Kurachkina competed in the women's 51 kg event at the 2013 World Wrestling Championships held in Budapest, Hungary. In March 2016, she won the silver medal in the women's 53 kg event at the European Wrestling Championships held in Riga, Latvia. The next month, Kurachkina competed in the qualification tournament held in Ulaanbaatar, Mongolia hoping to qualify for the 2016 Summer Olympics in Rio de Janeiro, Brazil. She did not advance far as she was eliminated in her first match.

At the 2017 World U23 Wrestling Championship held in Bydgoszcz, Poland, she won the silver medal in the women's 55 kg event. Kurachkina also won one of the bronze medals in the women's 55 kg event at the 2017 World Wrestling Championships held in Paris, France. In 2018, she competed in the women's freestyle event of the 2018 Wrestling World Cup. A few months later, Kurachkina won the gold medal in the women's 55 kg event at the 2018 European Wrestling Championships held in Kaspiysk, Dagestan, Russia. Later that year, she competed in the women's 57 kg event at the 2018 World Wrestling Championships held in Budapest, Hungary where she was eliminated in her first match.

At the 2019 European Games held in Minsk, Belarus, Kurachkina won the gold medal in the women's 57 kg event. In the final, she defeated Mimi Hristova of Bulgaria. At the 2019 World Wrestling Championships held in Nur-Sultan, Kazakhstan, Kurachkina won one of the bronze medals in the women's 57 kg event. She qualified at this competition to represent Belarus at the 2020 Summer Olympics in Tokyo, Japan.

In 2020, Kurachkina won the gold medal by defeating Annika Wendle of Germany in the final of the women's 55 kg event at the Individual Wrestling World Cup held in Belgrade, Serbia. In 2021, she won the gold medal in the 57 kg event at the European Wrestling Championships held in Warsaw, Poland. A few months later, Kurachkina won the silver medal in her event at the 2021 Poland Open held in Warsaw, Poland.

With a bronze medal and a third place win at the 2019 World Wrestling Championships, Kurachkina qualified for the Tokyo 2020 Olympics as the number #3 seed. In Kurachkina's Olympic debut, she defeated, reigning Asian Champion, India's Anshu Malik by the score 8–2 after going all six-minutes; Kurachkina then went on to win 6–3 over 2016 Olympic Silver medalist, Valeria Koblova, representing the ROC, which would give Kurachkina a place in the semi-final. Opposing Kurachkina in the semi-final was unseeded Evelina Nikolova, who Kurachkina defeated by 11-0 technical superiority.

In 2022, she won one of the bronze medals in the 57 kg event at the Yasar Dogu Tournament held in Istanbul, Turkey.

Kurachkina won the gold medal in the 57 kg event at the 2024 European Wrestling Championships held in Bucharest, Romania. In the final, she defeated Evelina Nikolova of Bulgaria. She competed at the 2024 European Wrestling Olympic Qualification Tournament in Baku, Azerbaijan and she earned a quota place for the Individual Neutral Athletes for the 2024 Summer Olympics in Paris, France. Kurachkina was not invited to compete at the Olympics and Alina Hrushyna of Ukraine competed in her place instead.

== Achievements ==
Year	Tournament	Location	Result	Event
2016	European Championships	Riga, Latvia	2nd	Freestyle 53 kg
2017	World Championships	Paris, France	3rd	Freestyle 55 kg
2018	European Championships	Kaspiysk, Russia	1st	Freestyle 55 kg
2019	European Games	Minsk, Belarus	1st	Freestyle 57 kg
2019	World Championships	Nur-Sultan, Kazakhstan	3rd	Freestyle 57 kg
2020	European Championships	Rome, Italy	3rd	Freestyle 57 kg
2021	European Championships	Warsaw, Poland	1st	Freestyle 57 kg
2021	Summer Olympics	Tokyo, Japan	2nd	Freestyle 57 kg
2024	European Championships	Bucharest, Romania	1st	Freestyle 57 kg
2026	World Championships	Astana, Kazakhstan	3rd	Freestyle 57 kg
