= Tungalagiin Mönkhtuyaa =

Mongolian freestyle wrestler

Personal information
- Nationality: (Mongolia) Mongol
- Born: 29 August 1988 (age 37) Mongolia
- Height: 1.60 m (5 ft 3 in)

Sport
- Sport: Wrestling
- Event: Freestyle
Medal record
Representing Mongolia
Women's Freestyle wrestling
FILA Wrestling World Championships
| Bronze medal – third place | 2012 Canada | 59 kg |
| Bronze medal – third place | 2013 Budapest, Hungary | 59 kg |
FILA World Team Championships
| Silver medal – second place | 2013 Ulaanbaatar, Mongolia | 59 kg |
Asian Wrestling Championships
| Silver medal – second place | 2013 New Delhi, India | 59 kg |

Tungalagiin Mönkhtuyaa (Mongolian: Тунгалагийн Мөнхтуяа) is a female Mongolian wrestler.
