= Olga Butkevych =

Ukrainian-British wrestler (born 1986)

Olga McGlinchey
- Weight: 60 kg (132 lb)
- Born: 3 January 1986 (age 40); Zaporizhia, Ukrainian SSR, Soviet Union
- Olympic team: United Kingdom
Medal record
Representing Great Britain
Women's freestyle wrestling
World Championships
Bronze medal – third place	2012 Strathcona County	59kg
European Championships
Bronze medal – third place	2011 Dortmund	59 kg
Bronze medal – third place	2014 Vantaa	59 kg
Commonwealth Championship
Silver medal – second place	2013 Johannesburg	63 kg
Women's catch wrestling
Snake Pit World Championships
Gold medal – first place	2019 Bolton	63 kg

Olga McGlinchey (née Butkevych; born 3 January 1986) is a Ukrainian-British wrestler. She became Britain's first medalist at the World Wrestling Championships by winning bronze in 2012. She is also a two-time European Championship bronze medalist (2011, 2014) and a 2013 Commonwealth Championship silver medalist. She was Britain's sole wrestler the 2012 Summer Olympics.

== Biography ==
McGlinchey was born Olga Butkevych on 3 January 1986 in Zaporizhia, Ukrainian SSR, Soviet Union. She began wrestling at fourteen. She represented Ukraine in junior competition, placing fifth at the 2005 World Junior Championships and first at the 2006 European Junior Championships.

McGlinchey was brought to Britain in 2007 by Nikolei Kornieiev, the Ukrainian-born coach of the British team, to help with training and to act as a sparring partner for British wrestlers. She began competing for Great Britain at wrestling competitions, including the World Championships, where national citizenship is not required. She took third place in the women's 59 kilograms (130 lb) competition at the European Wrestling Championships in April 2011, her first international medal for Great Britain. She placed second in the 2012 Summer Olympics wrestling test event in December 2011.

For McGlinchey to compete at the 2012 Games, she needed to gain British citizenship. The sport's governing body petitioned the Home Office in order to ensure that this was received in time for her registration for the Games. She became eligible for British citizenship in February 2012 after living in the UK for five years, and was granted British citizenship and a passport in May 2012. She had originally been turned down for the citizenship in March 2012, but was awarded it on appeal. This was controversial and led to some newspapers labelling her as a "Plastic Brit". Fellow Ukrainian and British wrestling team member Yana Stadnik had her citizenship application turned down at the same time that McGlinchey's was awarded. McGlinchey was Great Britain's sole wrestler at the 2012 Summer Games, where she competed in the women's 55 kilograms (121 lb) category. Great Britain were originally due to have three wrestling places, but the Olympic Qualification Standards ruled that it should be reduced to a single spot; with McGlinchey taking that spot. In the Olympic finals, she lost to Lissette Antes of Ecuador and was placed 11th in the final standings.

In September 2012, she became the first British wrestler to medal at the World Championships, when she won a bronze, in Edmonton, Canada.

In December 2013, McGlinchey competed at the Commonwealth Championship in Johannesburg, South Africa, and took silver.

In April 2014, she competed at the European Championship in Vantaa, Finland, finishing third again.

In November 2019, McGlinchey competed in catch wrestling at the Snake Pit World Championships in Bolton, England, winning the 63kg championship and the Arthur Silcock trophy for "best female wrestler of the night."
