= Iryna Chykhradze =

Ukrainian sport wrestler (born 1989)

Medal record

Women's freestyle wrestling

Representing Ukraine

World Championships
Bronze medal – third place	2014 Tashkent	55 kg

European Championships
Silver medal – second place	2009 Vilnius	59 kg

Iryna Chykhradze-Khariv (born 1989) is a freestyle wrestler from Ukraine. She won the bronze medal the 2014 World Wrestling Championships. She is of Georgian descent.

In 2021, she won one of the bronze medals in her event at the 2021 Poland Open held in Warsaw, Poland.
