= Yuliya Khavaldzhy =

Ukrainian freestyle wrestler

Personal information
- Full name: Yuliya Olehivna Khavaldzhy-Blahinya
- Nationality: Ukrainian
- Born: February 21, 1990 (age 36) Lviv, Ukrainian SSR, Soviet Union

Sport
- Sport: Sport wrestling
- Event: Freestyle
Medal record
Women's freestyle wrestling
Representing Ukraine
World Championships
Bronze medal – third place	2008 Tokyo	51 kg
World Cup
Bronze medal – third place	2010 Nanjing	51 kg
European Championships
Gold medal – first place	2011 Dortmund	51 kg
Silver medal – second place	2013 Tbilisi	51 kg
Bronze medal – third place	2008 Tampere	51 kg
Bronze medal – third place	2009 Vilnius	51 kg
Bronze medal – third place	2016 Riga	53 kg
European Games
Silver medal – second place	2019 Minsk	53 kg
Summer Universiade
Bronze medal – third place	Kazan 2013	51 kg
Junior World Championships
Gold medal – first place	2009 Ankara	55 kg
Silver medal – second place	2010 Budapest	55 kg
Junior European Championships
Gold medal – first place	2008 Kosice	51 kg
Bronze medal – third place	2009 Tbilisi	55 kg
Gold medal – first place	2010 Samokov	55 kg
Cadet European Championships
Bronze medal – third place	2007 Warsaw	56 kg

Yuliya Olehivna Khavaldzhy-Blahinya (Ukrainian: Юлія Олегівна Хавалджи-Благиня, also transliterated Yuliia or Iulia, born February 21, 1990, in Lviv, Soviet Union) is a Ukrainian female wrestler. She is the 2008 World bronze medalist and 2011 European champion in the 51 kg category.

She competed for Ukraine at the 2016 Summer Olympics.
