= Irina Ologonova =

Russian freestyle wrestler

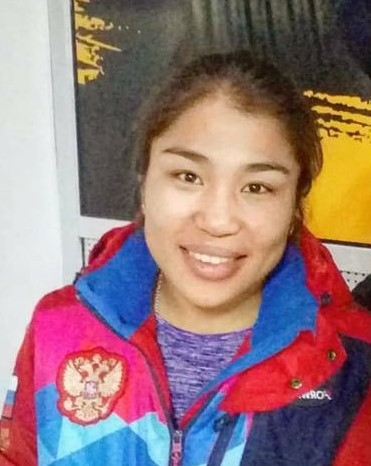

Personal information
- Full name: Irina Igorevna Ologonova
- Born: 21 January 1990 (age 36) Bayangol, Soviet Union
- Height: 1.58 m (5 ft 2 in)
- Weight: 55 kg (121 lb)

Sport
- Sport: Wrestling
- Event: Freestyle
Medal record
Representing Russia
Women's Freestyle wrestling
Wrestling World Championships
Silver medal – second place	2014 Tashkent	55 kg
Silver medal – second place	2015 Las Vegas	55 kg
Silver medal – second place	2016 Budapest	55 kg
European Wrestling Championships
Gold medal – first place	2016 Riga	55 kg
Silver medal – second place	2018 Kaspiysk	57 kg
Bronze medal – third place	2014 Vantaa	55 kg
Golden Grand Prix Ivan Yarygin
Gold medal – first place	2015 Krasnoyarsk	55 kg
Gold medal – first place	2022 Krasnoyarsk	55 kg

Irina Igorevna Ologonova (Russian: Ирина Игоревна Ологонова) is a Russian wrestler of Buryat descent. 3x world silver medalist.

In 2022, she competed at the Yasar Dogu Tournament held in Istanbul, Turkey.
