= Erkhembayaryn Davaachimeg =

Mongolian freestyle wrestler

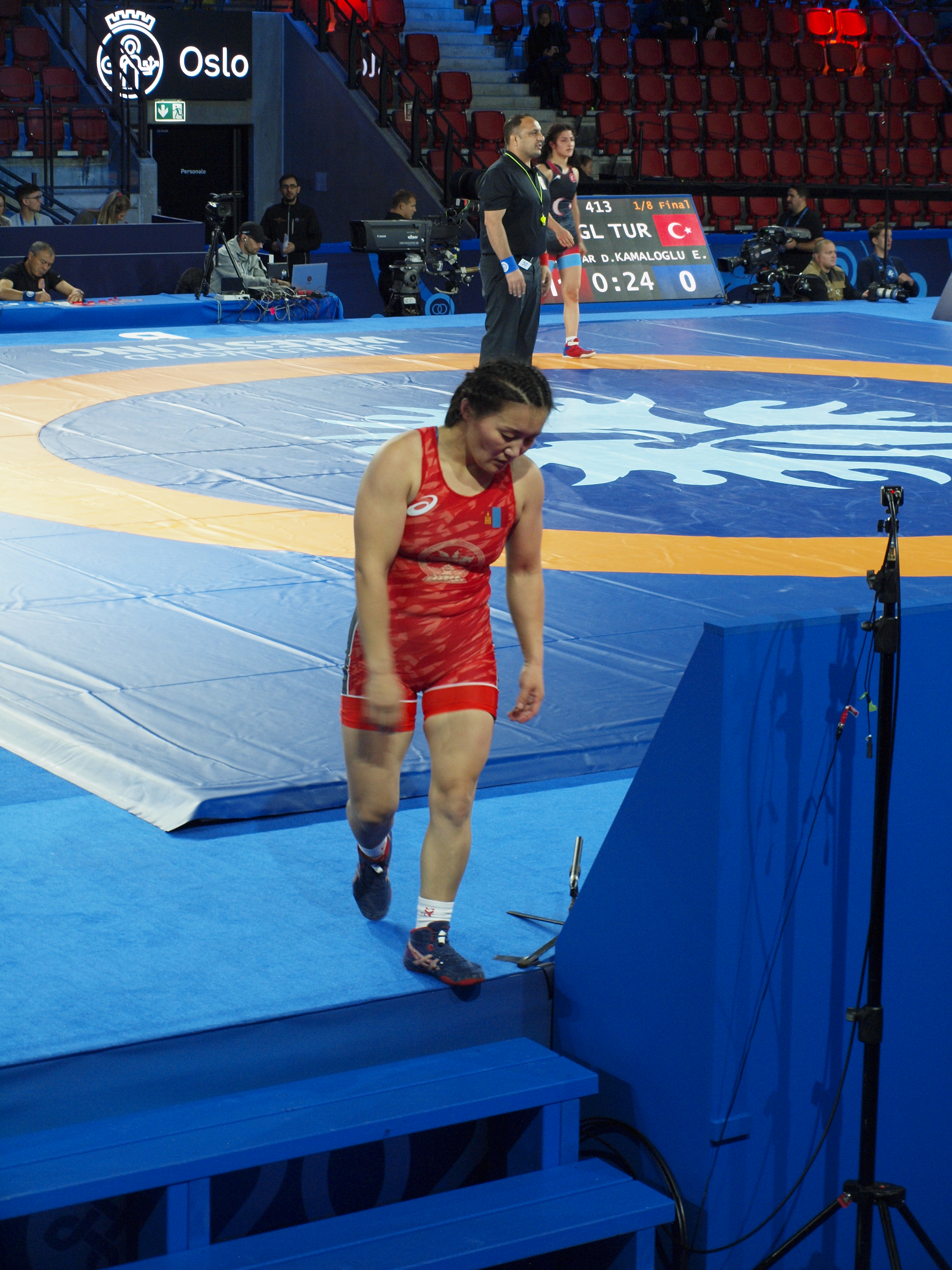
- Erkhembayaryn Davaachimeg at the 2021 World Wrestling Championships in Oslo, Norway

Personal information
- Native name: Эрхэмбаярын Даваачимэг
- Nationality: Mongolia
- Born: 22 March 1993 (age 33) Mongolia
- Height: 154 cm (5 ft 1 in)

Sport
- Country: Mongolia
- Sport: Wrestling
- Weight class: 57 kg
- Event: Freestyle

Achievements and titles
- World finals: (bronze) (2021)
- Regional finals: (silver) (2020)
Medal record
Women's freestyle wrestling
Representing Mongolia
World Championships
Bronze medal – third place	2021 Oslo	57 kg
World Cup
Bronze medal – third place	2022 Coralville	Team
Asian Championships
Silver medal – second place	2020 New Delhi	57 kg
Bronze medal – third place	2018 Bishkek	55 kg
Bronze medal – third place	2017 New Delhi	55 kg
Golden Grand Prix Ivan Yarygin
Gold medal – first place	2023 Krasnoyarsk	59 kg
Silver medal – second place	2021 Krasnoyarsk	59 kg
Bronze medal – third place	2018 Krasnoyarsk	55 kg
World University Championships
Silver medal – second place	2012 Kuortane	51 kg
World Juniors Championships
Gold medal – first place	2012 Pattaya	51 kg
Bronze medal – third place	2013 Sofia	51 kg
Asian Juniors Championships
Silver medal – second place	2012 Almaty	51 kg
Silver medal – second place	2011 Jakarta	51 kg

Erkhembayaryn Davaachimeg (Mongolian: Эрхэмбаярын Даваачимэг, born 22 March 1993) is a Mongolian freestyle wrestler. She won one of the bronze medals in the women's 57 kg event at the 2021 World Wrestling Championships in Oslo, Norway. She competed in the women's 57 kg event at the 2022 World Wrestling Championships held in Belgrade, Serbia.
