= Zalina Sidakova =

Belarusian freestyle wrestler

Personal information
- Full name: Zalina Chermenovna Sidakova
- Nationality: Russian; Belarusian
- Born: 23 March 1992 (age 34) Vladikavkaz, North Ossetia-Alania, Russia
- Height: 166 cm (5 ft 5 in)
- Weight: 59 kg (130 lb)

Sport
- Country: Belarus
- Sport: Amateur wrestling
- Event: Freestyle
- Coached by: Artur Zaytsev, Evgeny Lukomskiy
Medal record
Women's freestyle wrestling
Representing Belarus
World Championships
Silver medal – second place	2012 Strathcona County	59 kg
Silver medal – second place	2018 Budapest	55 kg
Individual World Cup
Bronze medal – third place	2020 Belgrade	53 kg

Zalina Chermenovna Sidakova (Russian: Залина Черменовна Сидакова; born 23 March 1992) is a Russian-Belarusian freestyle wrestler. She won two silver medals at the World Wrestling Championships: both in the women's 59 kg event in 2012 and in the women's 55 kg event in 2018.

In 2020, she won one of the bronze medals in the women's 53 kg event at the Individual Wrestling World Cup held in Belgrade, Serbia.

== Achievements ==
Year	Tournament	Location	Result	Event
2012	World Championships	Strathcona County, Alberta, Canada	2nd	Freestyle 59 kg
2018	World Championships	Budapest, Hungary	2nd	Freestyle 55 kg
