= Roksana Zasina =

Polish freestyle wrestler (born 1988)

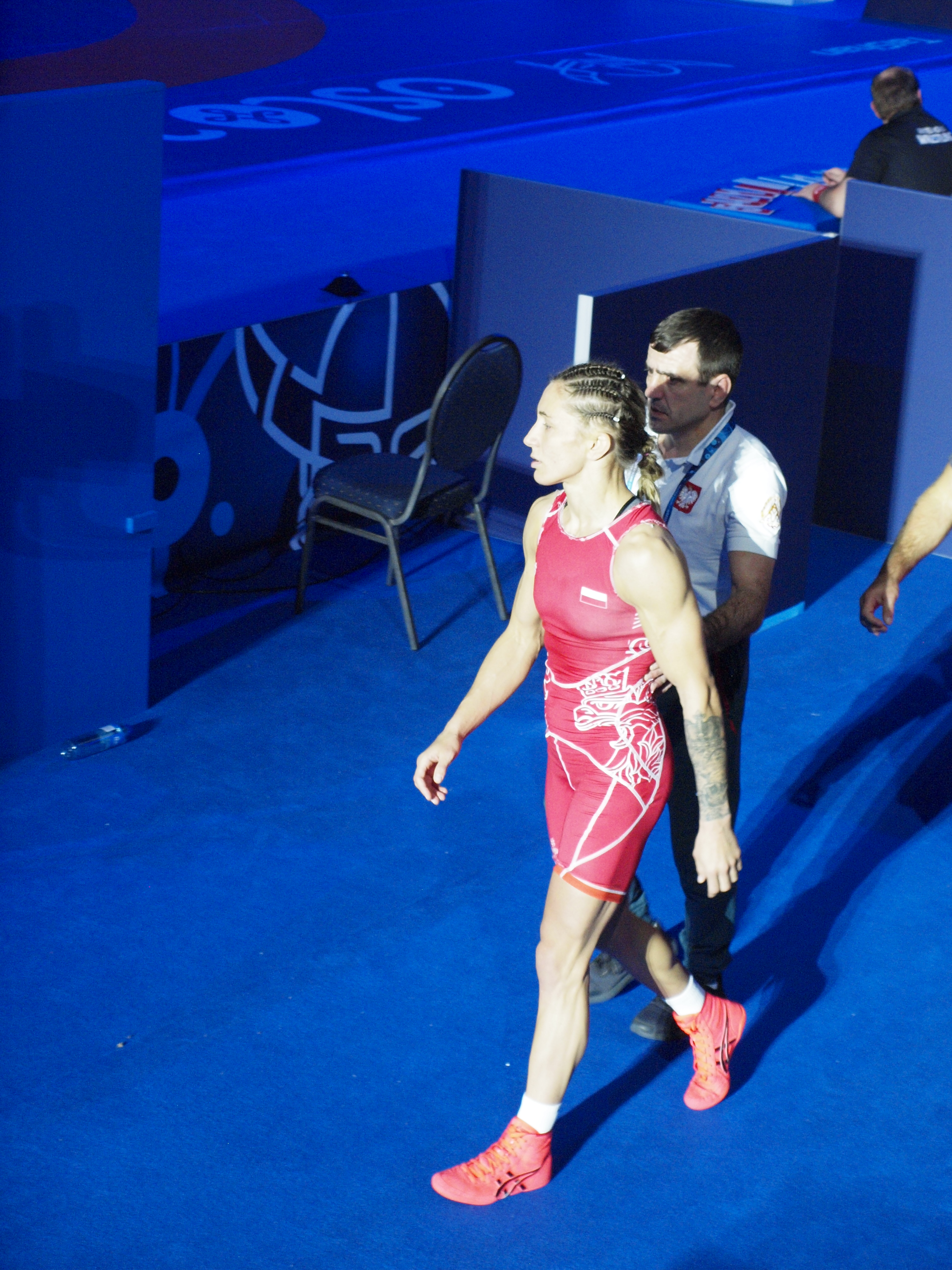
- Roksana Zasina at the 2021 World Wrestling Championships in Oslo, Norway

Personal information
- Born: 21 August 1988 (age 37) Łódź, Poland
- Height: 1.64 m (5 ft 5 in)
- Weight: 55 kg (121 lb; 8.7 st)

Sport
- Country: Poland
- Sport: Amateur wrestling
- Weight class: 55 kg
- Event: Freestyle
- Club: ZTA Zgierz
- Coached by: Marian Filipovicz
Medal record
Women's freestyle wrestling
Representing Poland
World Championships
Bronze medal – third place	2017 Paris	53 kg
European Championships
Gold medal – first place	2013 Tbilisi	51 kg
Silver medal – second place	2018 Kaspiysk	55 kg
Silver medal – second place	2021 Warsaw	55 kg
Bronze medal – third place	2016 Riga	55 kg
Bronze medal – third place	2024 Bucharest	55 kg
European Games
Silver medal – second place	2015 Baku	53 kg
Individual World Cup
Silver medal – second place	2020 Belgrade	53 kg
World Military Championships
Bronze medal – third place	2025 Warendorf	57 kg
Yasar Dogu Tournament
Bronze medal – third place	2011 Istanbul	51 kg
Dan Kolov - Nikola Petrov Tournament
Gold medal – first place	2018 Sofia	55 kg
Bronze medal – third place	2017 Ruse	53 kg
Bronze medal – third place	2019 Ruse	55 kg
Golden Grand Prix
Bronze medal – third place	2012 Baku	51 kg
Bronze medal – third place	2012 Klippan	55 kg
Grand Prix
Gold medal – first place	2013 Spala	51 kg
Gold medal – first place	2017 Warsaw	53 kg
Gold medal – first place	2018 Warsaw	55 kg
Silver medal – second place	2012 Madrid	51 kg
Silver medal – second place	2013 Madrid	55 kg
Silver medal – second place	2014 Madrid	53 kg
Silver medal – second place	2014 Dormagen	53 kg
Silver medal – second place	2015 Paris	53 kg
Silver medal – second place	2015 Spala	55 kg
Silver medal – second place	2019 Warsaw	53 kg
Bronze medal – third place	2013 Kyiv	51 kg
Bronze medal – third place	2015 Warsaw	55 kg
Bronze medal – third place	2015 Moscow	55 kg
Bronze medal – third place	2015 Madrid	55 kg
Bronze medal – third place	2018 Bucharest	55 kg
Bronze medal – third place	2019 Klippan	57 kg
Bronze medal – third place	2020 Warsaw	53 kg
Bronze medal – third place	2023 Warsaw	53 kg
Bronze medal – third place	2024 Zagreb	55 kg

Roksana Zasina (born 21 August 1988) is a Polish freestyle wrestler. She is a five-time medalist, including gold, at the European Wrestling Championships. She is also a bronze medalist at the World Wrestling Championships and a silver medalist at the European Games.

== Career ==
Zasina competed in the women's freestyle 51 kg event at the 2010 World Wrestling Championships held in Moscow, Russia. She lost her bronze medal match against Sofia Mattsson of Sweden.

In 2015, Zasina represented Poland at the European Games held in Baku, Azerbaijan and she won the silver medal in the 53 kg event.

At the 2017 World Wrestling Championships held in Paris, France, she won one of the bronze medals in the women's freestyle 53 kg event. In 2020, she won the silver medal in the women's 53 kg event at the Individual Wrestling World Cup held in Belgrade, Serbia. Zasina represented Poland at the 2020 Summer Olympics in Tokyo, Japan.

In 2021, Zasina competed in the 55 kg event at the World Wrestling Championships held in Oslo, Norway. She also competed in the 55 kg event at the 2022 World Wrestling Championships held in Belgrade, Serbia.

She won one of the bronze medals in the women's 55 kg event at the 2024 European Wrestling Championships held in Bucharest, Romania.

== Achievements ==
Year	Tournament	Location	Result	Event
2013	European Championships	Tbilisi, Georgia	1st	Freestyle 51 kg
2016	European Championships	Riga, Latvia	3rd	Freestyle 55 kg
2015	European Games	Baku, Azerbaijan	2nd	Freestyle 53 kg
2017	World Championships	Paris, France	3rd	Freestyle 53 kg
2018	European Championships	Kaspiysk, Russia	2nd	Freestyle 55 kg
2021	European Championships	Warsaw, Poland	2nd	Freestyle 55 kg
2024	European Championships	Bucharest, Romania	3rd	Freestyle 55 kg
