= Maria Gurova =

Russian freestyle wrestler

Maria Alexandrovna Gurova Мария Александровна Гурова
Personal information
- Nationality: (Russia) Russian
- Born: April 16, 1989 (age 37) Yegoryevsk, Russia
- Weight: 53 kg (117 lb); 55 kg

Sport
- Country: Russia
- Sport: Wrestling
- Event: Freestyle
- Club: Yegoryevsk Female's Wrestling club
- Coached by: Oleg Chernov
Medal record
Representing Russia
Women's Freestyle wrestling
European Championships
Gold medal – first place	2014 Vantaa	53 kg
Bronze medal – third place	2011 Dortmund	55 kg
Bronze medal – third place	2012 Belgrade	55 kg
Bronze medal – third place	2018 Kaspiysk	55 kg
European Nations Cup
Gold medal – first place	2015 Moscow	53 kg
Golden Grand Prix Ivan Yarygin
Bronze medal – third place	2016 Krasnoyarsk	53 kg
Poland Open
Bronze medal – third place	2014 Dąbrowa Górnicza	53 kg

Maria Aleksandrovna Gurova (Russian: Мария Александровна Гурова; born 16 April 1989) is a Russian retired freestyle wrestler. She competed at the 55 kg division in the 2012 European Wrestling Championships and won the bronze medal in the competition. She won the gold medal at the 2014 European Wrestling Championships after defeating Maria Prevolaraki of Greece. She studied in the Sholokhov Moscow State University for Humanities. 3x World cup runner up.
