= Evelina Nikolova =

Bulgarian freestyle wrestler (born 1993)

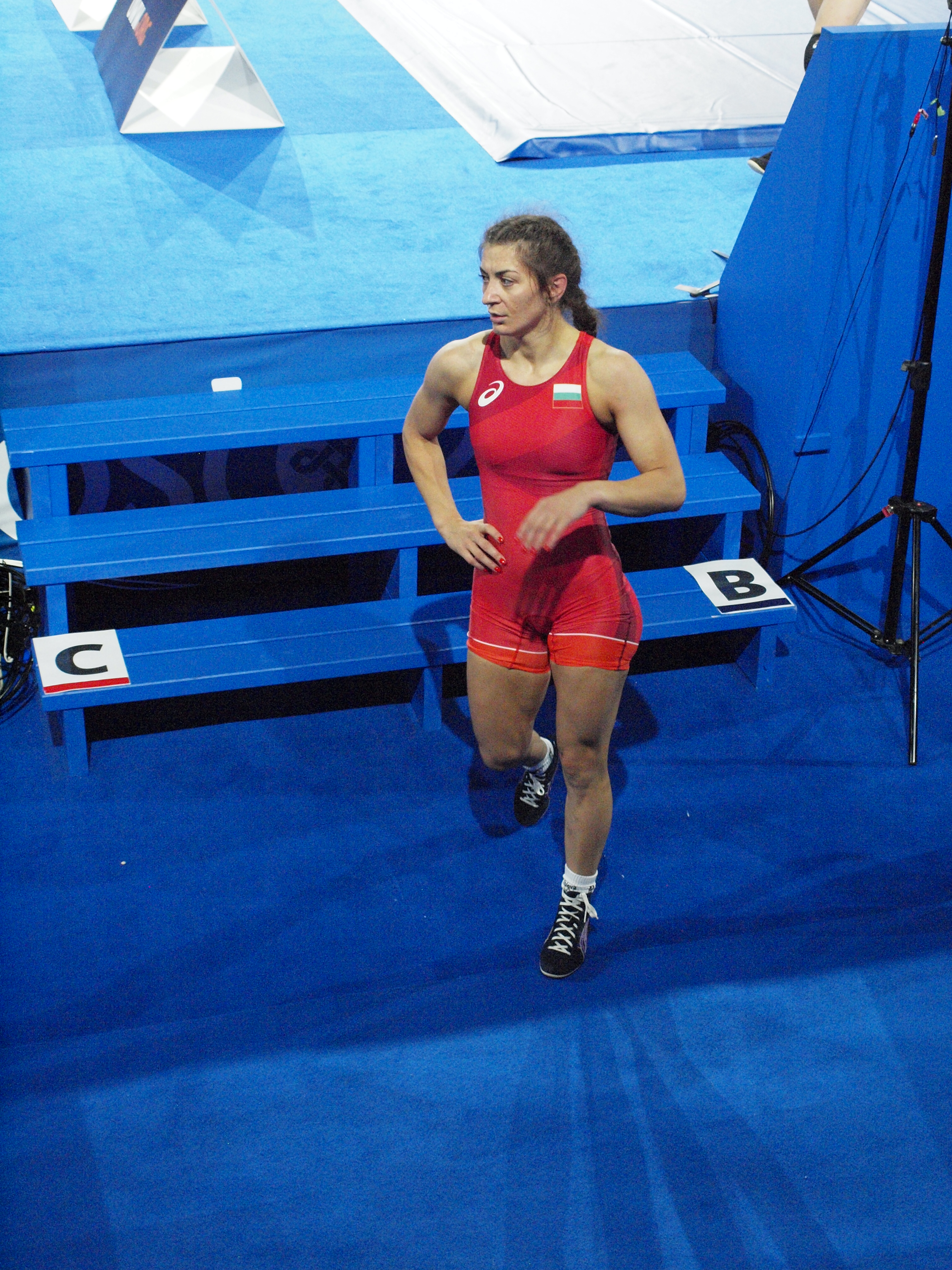
- Nikolova at the 2021 World Wrestling Championships in Oslo, Norway

Personal information
- Native name: Евелина Георгиева Николова
- Nationality: Bulgaria
- Born: Evelina Georgieva Nikolova; 18 January 1993 (age 33) Petrich, Bulgaria
- Height: 167 cm (5 ft 6 in)

Sport
- Country: Bulgaria
- Sport: Amateur wrestling
- Weight class: 55–57 kg
- Event: Freestyle
Medal record
Women's freestyle wrestling
Representing Bulgaria
Olympic Games
Bronze medal – third place	2020 Tokyo	57 kg
World Championships
Bronze medal – third place	2015 Las Vegas	55 kg
European Games
Bronze medal – third place	2015 Baku	55 kg
European Championships
Silver medal – second place	2019 Bucharest	55 kg
Silver medal – second place	2022 Budapest	57 kg
Silver medal – second place	2024 Bucharest	57 kg
Bronze medal – third place	2021 Warsaw	57 kg
Bronze medal – third place	2023 Zagreb	57 kg
Yasar Dogu Tournament
Gold medal – first place	2022 Istanbul	57 kg
Gold medal – first place	2021 Istanbul	59 kg
Dan Kolov - Nikola Petrov Tournament
Gold medal – first place	2022 Veliko Tarnovo	57 kg
Gold medal – first place	2024 Sofia	59 kg
Silver medal – second place	2014 Sofia	55 kg
Bronze medal – third place	2023 Sofia	57 kg

Evelina Georgieva Nikolova (Bulgarian: Евелина Георгиева Николова; born 18 January 1993, Petrich) is a Bulgarian freestyle wrestler. She won one of the bronze medals in the women's 57 kg event at the 2020 Summer Olympics held in Tokyo, Japan. She won a bronze medal at the 2015 World Wrestling Championships held in Las Vegas, United States. Nikolova is also a five-time medalist at the European Wrestling Championships and a bronze medalist at the European Games.

== Career ==
Nikolova represented Bulgaria at the 2015 European Games held in Baku, Azerbaijan and she won one of the bronze medals in the 55 kg event. In that same year, she also won a bronze medal in the 55 kg event at the 2015 World Wrestling Championships held in Las Vegas, United States. In her bronze medal match she defeated Pang Qianyu of China.

At the 2019 European Wrestling Championships held in Bucharest, Romania, she won the silver medal in the 55 kg event. In the final, she lost against Iryna Husyak of Ukraine. In 2020, Nikolova competed in the 55 kg event at the European Wrestling Championships where she was eliminated from the competition by Sofia Mattsson in her first match. Mattsson went on to win one of the bronze medals.

In March 2021, Nikolova qualified at the European Qualification Tournament to compete at the 2020 Summer Olympics in Tokyo, Japan. A month later, she won one of the bronze medals in the 57 kg event at the 2021 European Wrestling Championships held in Warsaw, Poland. At the 2020 Summer Olympics, Nikolova won her first match, against Jowita Wrzesień of Poland, in the women's 57 kg event and she also won her next match against Anastasia Nichita of Moldova. She then lost in the semi-finals against Iryna Kurachkina of Belarus. In her bronze medal match she defeated Valeria Koblova representing the Russian Olympic Committee. In October 2021, Nikolova was eliminated in her second match in the women's 57 kg event at the World Wrestling Championships in Oslo, Norway.

In February 2022, Nikolova won the gold medal in the 57 kg event at the Dan Kolov & Nikola Petrov Tournament held in Veliko Tarnovo, Bulgaria. In that same month, she won the gold medal in her event at the Yasar Dogu Tournament held in Istanbul, Turkey. In April 2022, she won the silver medal in the 57 kg event at the European Wrestling Championships held in Budapest, Hungary. She competed in the 57 kg event at the 2022 World Wrestling Championships held in Belgrade, Serbia.

On 28 October 2022, at a solemn meeting of the Municipal Council - Petrich, Evelina Nikolova, along with six other prominent citizens of Petrich, was awarded the title of Honorary Citizen of Petrich.

Nikolova won the bronze medal in her event at the 2023 Dan Kolov & Nikola Petrov Tournament held in Sofia, Bulgaria. She won one of the bronze medals in the 57 kg event at the 2023 European Wrestling Championships held in Zagreb, Croatia. She defeated Mathilde Rivière of France in her bronze medal match.

Nikolova won the silver medal in the 57 kg event at the 2024 European Wrestling Championships held in Bucharest, Romania. Nikolova competed at the 2024 European Wrestling Olympic Qualification Tournament in Baku, Azerbaijan hoping to qualify for the 2024 Summer Olympics in Paris, France. She was eliminated in her second match and she did not qualify for the Olympics. She also competed at the 2024 World Wrestling Olympic Qualification Tournament in Istanbul, Turkey without qualifying for the Olympics.

== Achievements ==
Year	Tournament	Location	Result	Event
2015	European Games	Baku, Azerbaijan	3rd	Freestyle 55 kg
2015	World Championships	Las Vegas, United States	3rd	Freestyle 55 kg
2019	European Championships	Bucharest, Romania	2nd	Freestyle 55 kg
2021	European Championships	Warsaw, Poland	3rd	Freestyle 57 kg
2021	Summer Olympics	Tokyo, Japan	3rd	Freestyle 57 kg
2022	European Championships	Budapest, Hungary	2nd	Freestyle 57 kg
2023	European Championships	Zagreb, Croatia	3rd	Freestyle 57 kg
2024	European Championships	Bucharest, Romania	2nd	Freestyle 57 kg
