= Tetyana Kit =

Ukrainian freestyle wrestler

Personal information
- Born: 1 September 1994 (age 31) Lviv, Ukraine
Medal record
Women's freestyle wrestling
Representing Ukraine
World Championships
Bronze medal – third place	2015 Las Vegas	55 kg
European Championships
Silver medal – second place	2016 Riga	55 kg
Silver medal – second place	2019 Bucharest	57 kg
World U23 Championships
Bronze medal – third place	2017 Bydgoszcz	58 kg

Tetyana Kit (Ukrainian: Тетяна Кіт, born 1 September 1994 in Lviv) is a Ukrainian freestyle wrestler of Spartak sports club. She was bronze medalist at the 2015 World Championships and silver medalist at the 2016 European championships in 2016.

In 2021, she won one of the bronze medals in her event at the 2021 Poland Open held in Warsaw, Poland. She represented Ukraine at the 2020 Summer Olympics in Tokyo, Japan. She competed in the women's 57 kg event.
