= 2007 World Wrestling Championships – Women's freestyle 55 kg =

Women's freestyle 55 kg at the 2007 World Championships
- Venue: Heydar Aliyev Sports and Concert Complex
- Dates: 22 September 2007
- Competitors: 38 from 38 nations

Medalists
gold medal	Saori Yoshida	Japan
silver medal	Ida-Theres Karlsson	Sweden
bronze medal	Natalia Golts	Russia
bronze medal	Olga Smirnova	Kazakhstan

The women's freestyle 55 kilograms is a competition featured at the 2007 World Wrestling Championships, and was held at the Heydar Aliyev Sports and Concert Complex in Baku, Azerbaijan on 22 September 2007.

== Results ==
Legend

- F — Won by fall

=== Finals ===
Semifinals			Final
Tetyana Lazareva (UKR)	0	0
Ida-Theres Karlsson (SWE)	2	4	Ida-Theres Karlsson (SWE)	0	0
Alena Filipava (BLR)	0	0	Saori Yoshida (JPN)	1	7
Saori Yoshida (JPN)	1	6

=== Top half ===
==== Section 1 ====
Round of 64

Round of 32
Marcie Van Dusen (USA)	5	3
Sabrina Esposito (ITA)	0	3
Marcia Andrades (VEN)	4^{F}
Lin Donevska (AUS)	0
Su Ying-tzu (TPE)	5	1
Ana Maria Pavăl (ROU)	0	0
Emese Szabó (HUN)	1
Tetyana Lazareva (UKR)	5^{F}

Round of 16
Marcie Van Dusen (USA)	0	2	2
Marcia Andrades (VEN)	1	1	0
Su Ying-tzu (TPE)	0	1
Tetyana Lazareva (UKR)	7	4^{F}

Quarterfinals
Marcie Van Dusen (USA)	0	0
Tetyana Lazareva (UKR)	6	2

==== Section 2 ====
Round of 64

Round of 32
Natalia Golts (RUS)	4	4
Xu Li (CHN)	0	1
Phạm Thị Huệ (VIE)	1	1	2
Rokhyatou Sonko (SEN)	3	0	3
Hela Riabi (TUN)	5^{F}
Leila Benmahmoud (ALG)	0
Ida-Theres Karlsson (SWE)	3^{F}
Sofia Poumpouridou (GRE)	1

Round of 16
Natalia Golts (RUS)	4	4^{F}
Rokhyatou Sonko (SEN)	1	0
Hela Riabi (TUN)	0	0
Ida-Theres Karlsson (SWE)	2	2^{F}

Quarterfinals
Natalia Golts (RUS)	1	1
Ida-Theres Karlsson (SWE)	3	2

=== Bottom half ===
==== Section 3 ====
Round of 64

Round of 32
Emriye Musta (TUR)	0
Anna Gomis (FRA)	5^{F}
Alena Filipava (BLR)	1	1
Naidangiin Otgonjargal (MGL)	0	1
Tonya Verbeek (CAN)	1	3	4
Alka Tomar (IND)	1	0	0
Nènè Touré (GUI)	1	0
Enid Rivera (PUR)	3	3

Round of 16
Anna Gomis (FRA)	0	0
Alena Filipava (BLR)	1	1
Tonya Verbeek (CAN)	6	5
Enid Rivera (PUR)	0	0

Quarterfinals
Alena Filipava (BLR)	0	3	3
Tonya Verbeek (CAN)	1	1	1

==== Section 4 ====
Round of 64
Yuliya Ratkevich (AZE)	2	4
Dinara Mirzaeva (UZB)	0	0
Nadine Tokar (SUI)	0	3^{F}
Viktorija Grigorjeva (LAT)	1	1
Anna Zwirydowska (POL)	1	1
Lee So-lae (KOR)	0	0
Jacira Mendonca (GBS)	2	0
Jackeline Rentería (COL)	2	5^{F}
Jessica Bechtel (GER)	0	0
Saori Yoshida (JPN)	3	6
Lenka Martináková (CZE)	0	0
Joice Silva (BRA)	2	2

Round of 32
Ludmila Cristea (MDA)	0	1
Olga Smirnova (KAZ)	2	5
Yuliya Ratkevich (AZE)	3^{F}
Nadine Tokar (SUI)	0
Anna Zwirydowska (POL)	0	0
Jackeline Rentería (COL)	2	1
Saori Yoshida (JPN)	4	6^{F}
Joice Silva (BRA)	0	0

Round of 16
Olga Smirnova (KAZ)	6	3
Yuliya Ratkevich (AZE)	0	0
Jackeline Rentería (COL)	3	1	0
Saori Yoshida (JPN)	2	2	3^{F}

Quarterfinals
Olga Smirnova (KAZ)	1	2
Saori Yoshida (JPN)	1	4

=== Repechage ===
Repechage round 1
Jessica Bechtel (GER)	1	1	1
Joice Silva (BRA)	0	3	2

Repechage round 2
Sofia Poumpouridou (GRE)	3	6
Hela Riabi (TUN)	0	0
Joice Silva (BRA)	0
Jackeline Rentería (COL)	6^{F}

Repechage round 3
Sofia Poumpouridou (GRE)	0
Natalia Golts (RUS)	4^{F}
Jackeline Rentería (COL)	0	0
Olga Smirnova (KAZ)	4	6^{F}

Bronze medals
Natalia Golts (RUS)	1	3
Tetyana Lazareva (UKR)	0	0
Olga Smirnova (KAZ)	5	3
Alena Filipava (BLR)	0	0
