= 2011 World Wrestling Championships – Women's freestyle 55 kg =

Women's freestyle 55 kg at the 2011 World Championships
- Venue: Sinan Erdem Dome
- Dates: 15 September 2011
- Competitors: 41 from 41 nations

Medalists
gold medal	Saori Yoshida	Japan
silver medal	Tonya Verbeek	Canada
bronze medal	Tetyana Lazareva	Ukraine
bronze medal	Ida-Theres Nerell	Sweden

The women's freestyle 55 kilograms is a competition featured at the 2011 World Wrestling Championships, and was held at the Sinan Erdem Dome in Istanbul, Turkey on 15 September 2011.

== Results ==
Legend

- F — Won by fall

=== Finals ===
Semifinals				Final
Tonya Verbeek (CAN)	0	3	1
Tetyana Lazareva (UKR)	1	1	0	Tonya Verbeek (CAN)	0	2	2
Saori Yoshida (JPN)	6	6		Saori Yoshida (JPN)	1	2	3
Ida-Theres Nerell (SWE)	0	0

=== Top half ===
==== Section 1 ====
Round of 64

Round of 32
Maria Prevolaraki (GRE)	0	1
Batbaataryn Nomin-Erdene (MGL)	1	2
Tonya Verbeek (CAN)	0	1	1
Maria Gurova (RUS)	1	0	1
Anastasija Grigorjeva (LAT)	9^{F}
Ana Maria Pavăl (ROU)	2
Yuliya Ratkevich (AZE)	1	4
Salomat Kuchimova (UZB)	0	0

Round of 16
Batbaataryn Nomin-Erdene (MGL)	0	0
Tonya Verbeek (CAN)	5	2
Anastasija Grigorjeva (LAT)	6	4
Yuliya Ratkevich (AZE)	0	4^{F}

Quarterfinals
Tonya Verbeek (CAN)	1	1	3
Yuliya Ratkevich (AZE)	2	0	0

==== Section 2 ====
Round of 64

Round of 32
Emese Barka (HUN)	0	4
Marwa Amri (TUN)	6	5
Katarzyna Krawczyk (POL)	1	6	3^{F}
Nicole Hauptmann (GER)	3	0	0
Tetyana Lazareva (UKR)	6	5
Zalina Sidakova (BLR)	0	0
Vânia Guerreiro (POR)	0	6^{F}
Trần Thị Diệu Ninh (VIE)	1	3

Round of 16
Marwa Amri (TUN)	1	0
Katarzyna Krawczyk (POL)	1	1
Tetyana Lazareva (UKR)	7	7
Vânia Guerreiro (POR)	0	1

Quarterfinals
Katarzyna Krawczyk (POL)	0	4
Tetyana Lazareva (UKR)	2	5

=== Bottom half ===
==== Section 3 ====
Round of 64
Aiyim Abdildina (KAZ)	0	2
Helen Maroulis (USA)	6	5

Round of 32
Indrė Bubelytė (LTU)	0	0
Gulina Kubatbek Kyzy (KGZ)	1	1
Mirjana Martinović (MNE)	0
Alma Valencia (MEX)	4^{F}
Saori Yoshida (JPN)	5^{F}
Emriye Musta (TUR)	0
Valya Trandeva (BUL)	2	0
Helen Maroulis (USA)	1	4^{F}

Round of 16
Gulina Kubatbek Kyzy (KGZ)	1	1
Alma Valencia (MEX)	2	8
Saori Yoshida (JPN)	4^{F}
Helen Maroulis (USA)	0

Quarterfinals
Alma Valencia (MEX)	0	0
Saori Yoshida (JPN)	5	7

==== Section 4 ====
Round of 64
Ida-Theres Nerell (SWE)	4^{F}
Pak Yon-hui (PRK)	0
Lenka Martináková (CZE)	0	0
Ludmila Cristea (MDA)	3	7^{F}
Jenny Mallqui (PER)	1	1	0
Lissette Antes (ECU)	0	2	3
Anna Gomis (FRA)	2	2
Fabienne Wittenwiler (SUI)	0	0
Zhang Lan (CHN)	3	1
Marcia Andrades (VEN)	1	0
Jackeline Rentería (COL)	0	0
Geeta Phogat (IND)	4	7
Simona Corbani (ITA)	0	1
Joice Silva (BRA)	1	4
Um Ji-eun (KOR)	3	6
Minerva Montero (ESP)	0	0

Round of 32
Ida-Theres Nerell (SWE)	0	4	1
Ludmila Cristea (MDA)	2	0	0
Lissette Antes (ECU)	3^{F}
Anna Gomis (FRA)	0
Zhang Lan (CHN)	0	0
Geeta Phogat (IND)	5	1
Joice Silva (BRA)	1	0
Um Ji-eun (KOR)	2	1

Round of 16
Ida-Theres Nerell (SWE)	4^{F}
Lissette Antes (ECU)	0
Geeta Phogat (IND)	4	0	3
Um Ji-eun (KOR)	0	6	0

Quarterfinals
Ida-Theres Nerell (SWE)	2	1
Geeta Phogat (IND)	1	0

=== Repechage ===
Repechage round 2
Maria Gurova (RUS)	1	4
Batbaataryn Nomin-Erdene (MGL)	0	4
Emriye Musta (TUR)	2	2
Helen Maroulis (USA)	6	6

Repechage round 3
Maria Gurova (RUS)	2	0	2
Yuliya Ratkevich (AZE)	0	1	1
Helen Maroulis (USA)	5	4
Alma Valencia (MEX)	0	0

Bronze medals
Maria Gurova (RUS)	1	0	0
Tetyana Lazareva (UKR)	1	1	2
Helen Maroulis (USA)	1
Ida-Theres Nerell (SWE)	8^{F}
