= Saori Yoshida =

Japanese freestyle wrestler

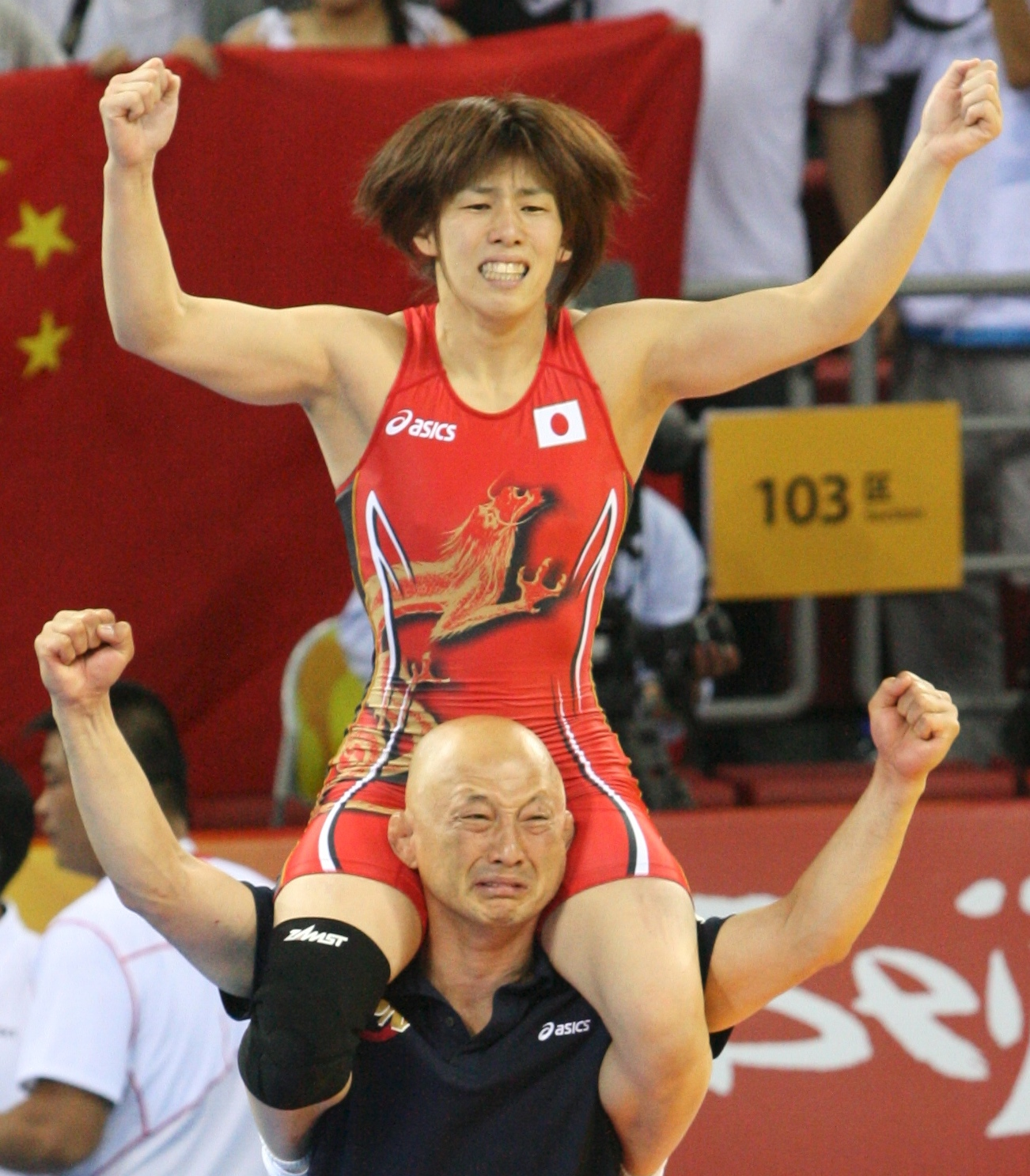
- Saori Yoshida with her coach Kazuhito Sakae after winning the 2008 Olympic gold

Personal information
- Born: 5 October 1982 (age 44) Tsu, Mie, Japan
- Education: Shigakkan University
- Height: 1.57 m (5 ft 2 in)
- Weight: 53 kg (117 lb)

Sport
- Sport: Professional wrestling
- Event: Freestyle
- Club: High School Wrestling Club Hisai; Sogho Security Services; ALSOK Tokyo
- Coached by: Masanori Ohashi; Shigeo Kinase; Kazuhito Sakae; Eikatsu Yoshida
Medal record
Women's freestyle wrestling
Representing Japan
Olympic Games
Gold medal – first place	2004 Athens	55 kg
Gold medal – first place	2008 Beijing	55 kg
Gold medal – first place	2012 London	55 kg
Silver medal – second place	2016 Rio de Janeiro	53 kg
World Championships
Gold medal – first place	2002 Chalkida	55 kg
Gold medal – first place	2003 New York	55 kg
Gold medal – first place	2005 Budapest	55 kg
Gold medal – first place	2006 Guangzhou	55 kg
Gold medal – first place	2007 Baku	55 kg
Gold medal – first place	2008 Tokyo	55 kg
Gold medal – first place	2009 Herning	55 kg
Gold medal – first place	2010 Moscow	55 kg
Gold medal – first place	2011 Istanbul	55 kg
Gold medal – first place	2012 Edmonton	55 kg
Gold medal – first place	2013 Budapest	55 kg
Gold medal – first place	2014 Tashkent	53 kg
Gold medal – first place	2015 Las Vegas	53 kg
Asian Games
Gold medal – first place	2002 Busan	55 kg
Gold medal – first place	2006 Doha	55 kg
Gold medal – first place	2010 Guangzhou	55 kg
Gold medal – first place	2014 Incheon	55 kg
Asian Championships
Gold medal – first place	2004 Tokyo	55 kg
Gold medal – first place	2005 Wuhan	55 kg
Gold medal – first place	2007 Bishkek	55 kg
Gold medal – first place	2008 Jeju	55 kg

Saori Yoshida (吉田 沙保里, Yoshida Saori; born 5 October 1982) is a Japanese former freestyle wrestler. Starting in 1998, she won almost every major competition, including three Olympic Games, four Asian Games, and 13 world championships, becoming the most decorated athlete in freestyle wrestling history. As of 2016, Yoshida had only suffered three senior-career losses in international competitions, to Marcie Van Dusen (0–2) on 20 January 2008 at the Team World Cup series, Valeria Zholobova (1–2) on 27 May 2012 at the World Cup, and to Helen Maroulis (1–4) on 18 August 2016 at the Olympic Games in Rio de Janeiro.

Yoshida was the flagbearer for Japan at the 2006 Asian Games and at the 2012 Olympics. In 2007, she became the first female wrestler to be named Japanese Athlete of the Year, and in 2012 she received the People's Honour Award.

== Weight ==
Yoshida started competing internationally as a cadet, in 1998, in the 52 kg category. By 2002, when she moved to seniors, she competed in the 59 kg division. The same year, she lost 4 kg, and remained in the 55 kg category until 2014. She moved to the 53 kg class at the 2014 World Cup and World Championships as part of her preparation for the 2016 Olympics, where the traditional 48–55–63–75 kg scheme would be changed to 48–53–58–63–69–75 kg. However, two weeks after the World Championships she returned to the 55 kg category at the 2014 Asian Games, which kept the old weight divisions. Yoshida announced her retirement on Twitter in January 2019.

== Family and public life ==
Yoshida is the daughter of Eikatsu Yoshida, a former national champion and wrestling coach. She started training in wrestling aged 3, following her father and two elder brothers. Since 2011, she has been a face of the ALSOK security group and regularly appears in their commercials.

In December 2008, the wrestling singlet which Yoshida wore in the Olympic final bout earlier that year, was sold for 551,000 yen (ca. US$6,123) at an internet auction, and the money donated to the Japanese Red Cross Society.

In 2013, when the International Olympic Committee named wrestling as a candidate for exclusion from the Games, she became an active part of the Japanese lobbying team that persuaded the IOC to retain wrestling at the 2020 Tokyo Olympics.

In May 2014, Yoshida made a cameo appearance in the Japanese television drama Tokyo Metropolitan Guard Center, and later wished to resume acting once she retired from wrestling.

== Olympic Games/World Championship/Asian Games matches ==
Res.	Record	Opponent	Score	Date	Event	Location
2016 Olympic silver medalist at 53kg
Loss	89-1	(United States) Helen Maroulis	1-4	August 18, 2016	2016 Summer Olympics	(Brazil) Rio de Janeiro
Win	89-0	(Venezuela) Betzabeth Argüello	6-0	August 18, 2016	2016 Summer Olympics	(Brazil) Rio de Janeiro
Win	88-0	(Senegal) Isabelle Sambou	4-0	August 18, 2016	2016 Summer Olympics	(Brazil) Rio de Janeiro
Win	87-0	(Azerbaijan) Nataliya Synyshyn	9-0	August 18, 2016	2016 Summer Olympics	(Brazil) Rio de Janeiro
2015 World champion at 53kg
Win	86-0	(Sweden) Sofia Mattsson	2-1	September 10, 2015	2015 World Championship	(United States) Las Vegas, NV
Win	85-0	(North Korea) Jong Myong-suk	5-2	September 10, 2015	2015 World Championship	(United States) Las Vegas, NV
Win	84-0	(Azerbaijan) Anzhela Dorogan	11-0	September 10, 2015	2015 World Championship	(United States) Las Vegas, NV
Win	83-0	(Vietnam) Nguyễn Thị Lụa	10-0	September 10, 2015	2015 World Championship	(United States) Las Vegas, NV
Win	82-0	(Switzerland) Nadine Tokar	Fall	September 10, 2015	2015 World Championship	(United States) Las Vegas, NV
2014 Asian Games champion at 55kg
Win	81-0	(Mongolia) Sündeviin Byambatseren	12-1	September 28, 2014	2014 Asian Games	(South Korea) Inchon
Win	80-0	(India) Babita Kumari	14-4	September 28, 2014	2014 Asian Games	(South Korea) Inchon
Win	79-0	(Vietnam) Phạm Thị Loan	Fall	September 28, 2014	2014 Asian Games	(South Korea) Inchon
Win	78-0	(China) Zhong Xuechun	12-9	September 28, 2014	2014 Asian Games	(South Korea) Inchon
2014 World champion at 53kg
Win	77-0	(Sweden) Sofia Mattsson	6-0	September 10, 2014	2014 World Championship	(Uzbekistan) Tashkent
Win	76-0	(Canada) Jillian Gallays	Fall	September 10, 2014	2014 World Championship	(Uzbekistan) Tashkent
Win	75-0	(Russia) Natalia Malysheva	10-0	September 10, 2014	2014 World Championship	(Uzbekistan) Tashkent
Win	74-0	(China) Pang Qianyu	Fall	September 10, 2014	2014 World Championship	(Uzbekistan) Tashkent
2013 World champion at 55kg
Win	73-0	(Sweden) Sofia Mattsson	5-0	September 19, 2013	2013 World Championship	(Hungary) Budapest
Win	72-0	(Ukraine) Iryna Husyak	8-0	September 19, 2013	2013 World Championship	(Hungary) Budapest
Win	71-0	(Mongolia) Sündeviin Byambatseren	8-0	September 19, 2013	2013 World Championship	(Hungary) Budapest
Win	70-0	(Russia) Valeria Koblova	7-0	September 19, 2013	2013 World Championship	(Hungary) Budapest
Win	69-0	(Romania) Ana Maria Pavăl	8-0	September 19, 2013	2013 World Championship	(Hungary) Budapest
2012 World champion at 55kg
Win	68-0	(United States) Helen Maroulis	Fall	September 28, 2012	2012 World Championship	(Canada) Strathcona County, AL
Win	67-0	(Ukraine) Nataliya Synyshyn	Fall	September 28, 2012	2012 World Championship	(Canada) Strathcona County, AL
Win	66-0	(India) Geeta Phogat	Fall	September 28, 2012	2012 World Championship	(Canada) Strathcona County, AL
Win	65-0	(Kazakhstan) Akziya Dautbayeva	Fall	September 28, 2012	2012 World Championship	(Canada) Strathcona County, AL
2012 Olympic champion at 55kg
Win	64-0	(Canada) Tonya Verbeek	3-0, 2-0	9 August 2012	2012 Summer Olympics	(United Kingdom) London
Win	63-0	(Russia) Valeria Zholobova	1-0, 2-0	9 August 2012	2012 Summer Olympics	(United Kingdom) London
Win	62-0	(Azerbaijan) Yuliya Ratkevich	1-0, 2-0	9 August 2012	2012 Summer Olympics	(United Kingdom) London
Win	61-0	(United States) Kelsey Campbell	1-0, 1-0	9 August 2012	2012 Summer Olympics	(United Kingdom) London
2011 World champion at 55kg
Win	60-0	(Canada) Tonya Verbeek	0-1, 2-2, 3-2	September 15, 2011	2011 World Championship	(Turkey) Istanbul
Win	59-0	(Sweden) Ida-Theres Nerell	6-0, 6-0	September 15, 2011	2011 World Championship	(Turkey) Istanbul
Win	58-0	(Mexico) Alma Valencia	5-0, 7-0	September 15, 2011	2011 World Championship	(Turkey) Istanbul
Win	57-0	(United States) Helen Maroulis	Fall	September 15, 2011	2011 World Championship	(Turkey) Istanbul
Win	56-0	(Turkey) Emriye Musta	Fall	September 15, 2011	2011 World Championship	(Turkey) Istanbul
2010 Asian Games champion at 55kg
Win	55-0	(China) Zhang Lan	5-0, 1-0	November 26, 2010	2010 Asian Games	(China) Guangzhou
Win	54-0	(North Korea) Pak Yon-hui	Fall	November 26, 2010	2010 Asian Games	(China) Guangzhou
Win	53-0	(Uzbekistan) Liliya Shakirova	1-0, 7-0	November 26, 2010	2010 Asian Games	(China) Guangzhou
Win	52-0	(Mongolia) Batbaataryn Nomin-Erdene	4-0, 5-0	November 26, 2010	2010 Asian Games	(China) Guangzhou
2010 World champion at 55kg
Win	51-0	(Canada) Yuliya Ratkevich	2-0, 6-0	September 9, 2010	2010 World Championship	(Russia) Moscow
Win	50-0	(Russia) Maria Gurova	5-0, 3-0	September 9, 2010	2010 World Championship	(Russia) Moscow
Win	49-0	(United States) Tatiana Suarez	3-0, 7-0	September 9, 2010	2010 World Championship	(Russia) Moscow
Win	48-0	(Uzbekistan) Tamara Kazaryan	6-0, 6-0	September 9, 2010	2010 World Championship	(Russia) Moscow
Win	47-0	(South Korea) Um Ji-eun	Fall	September 9, 2010	2010 World Championship	(Russia) Moscow
2009 World champion at 55kg
Win	46-0	(Azerbaijan) Sona Ahmadli	3-0, 6-0	September 24, 2009	2009 World Championship	(Denmark) Herning
Win	45-0	(Canada) Tonya Verbeek	3-0, 3-2	September 24, 2009	2009 World Championship	(Denmark) Herning
Win	44-0	(Romania) Ana Maria Pavăl	Fall	September 24, 2009	2009 World Championship	(Denmark) Herning
Win	43-0	(France) Anna Gomis	1-0, 2-1	September 24, 2009	2009 World Championship	(Denmark) Herning
Win	42-0	(Madagascar) Maminirina Rafaliharisolo	8-0, 7-0	September 24, 2009	2009 World Championship	(Denmark) Herning
2008 Olympic champion at 55kg
Win	41-0	(China) Xu Li	Fall	August 16, 2008	2008 Summer Olympics	(China) Beijing
Win	40-0	(Canada) Tonya Verbeek	2-0, 6-0	August 16, 2008	2008 Summer Olympics	(China) Beijing
Win	39-0	(Russia) Natalia Golts	2-1, 4-0	August 16, 2008	2008 Summer Olympics	(China) Beijing
Win	38-0	(Sweden) Ida-Theres Nerell	3-1, 4-0	August 16, 2008	2008 Summer Olympics	(China) Beijing
2007 World champion at 55kg
Win	37-0	(Sweden) Ida-Theres Nerell	8-0	September 21, 2007	2007 World Championship	(Azerbaijan) Baku
Win	36-0	(Belarus) Alena Filipava	7-0	September 21, 2007	2007 World Championship	(Azerbaijan) Baku
Win	35-0	(Colombia) Jackeline Rentería Castillo	7-4	September 21, 2007	2007 World Championship	(Azerbaijan) Baku
Win	34-0	(Brazil) Joice Silva	10-0	September 21, 2007	2007 World Championship	(Azerbaijan) Baku
Win	33-0	(Germany) Jessica Bechtel	9-0	September 21, 2007	2007 World Championship	(Azerbaijan) Baku
2006 Asian Games champion at 55kg
Win	32-0	(Kazakhstan) Olga Smirnova	3-0, 6-0	December 11, 2006	2006 Asian Games	(Qatar) Doha
Win	31-0	(China) Su Lihui	6-1, 2-0	December 11, 2006	2006 Asian Games	(Qatar) Doha
Win	30-0	(India) Alka Tomar	1-0, 5-0	December 11, 2006	2006 Asian Games	(Qatar) Doha
2006 World champion at 55kg
Win	29-0	(Belarus) Mariya Ivanova	13-0	September 29, 2006	2006 World Championship	(China) Guangzhou
Win	28-0	(Sweden) Ida-Theres Nerell	10-3	September 29, 2006	2006 World Championship	(China) Guangzhou
Win	27-0	(France) Anna Gomis	3-1	September 29, 2006	2006 World Championship	(China) Guangzhou
Win	26-0	(Russia) Natalya Golts	8-0	September 29, 2006	2006 World Championship	(China) Guangzhou
Win	25-0	(Venezuela) Marcia Mendoza	6-3	September 29, 2006	2006 World Championship	(China) Guangzhou
2005 World champion at 55kg
Win	24-0	(China) Lihui Su	6-0	September 28, 2005	2006 World Championship	(Hungary) Budapest
Win	23-0	(Canada) Tonya Verbeek	4-0	September 28, 2005	2006 World Championship	(Hungary) Budapest
Win	22-0	(Moldova) Ludmila Cristea	6-0	September 28, 2005	2006 World Championship	(Hungary) Budapest
Win	21-0	(Romania) Ana Maria Paval	4-0	September 28, 2005	2006 World Championship	(Hungary) Budapest
Win	20-0	(India) Rathi Neha	10-0	September 28, 2005	2006 World Championship	(Hungary) Budapest
2004 Olympic champion at 55kg
Win	19-0	(Canada) Tonya Verbeek	5-0	August 23, 2004	2004 Summer Olympics	(Greece) Athens
Win	18-0	(France) Anna Gomis	7-6	August 23, 2004	2004 Summer Olympics	(Greece) Athens
Win	17-0	(Italy) Diletta Giampiccolo	10-0	August 22, 2004	2004 Summer Olympics	(Greece) Athens
Win	16-0	(China) Sun Dongmei	11-0	August 22, 2004	2004 Summer Olympics	(Greece) Athens
2003 World champion at 55kg
Win	15-0	(United States) Tina George	5-2	September 12, 2003	2003 World Championship	(United States) New York City, NY
Win	14-0	(Russia) Natalya Golts	3-2	September 12, 2003	2003 World Championship	(United States) New York City, NY
Win	13-0	(Canada) Jennifer Ryz	10-0	September 12, 2003	2003 World Championship	(United States) New York City, NY
Win	12-0	(Poland) Monika Michalik	4-0	September 12, 2003	2003 World Championship	(United States) New York City, NY
Win	11-0	(Hungary) Kitti Godo	3-0	September 12, 2003	2003 World Championship	(United States) New York City, NY
Win	10-0	(Belarus) Olga Serbina	10-0	September 12, 2003	2003 World Championship	(United States) New York City, NY
2002 World champion at 55kg
Win	9-0	(United States) Tina George	10-4	November 11, 2002	2002 World Championship	(Greece) Chalkida
Win	8-0	(Sweden) Ida-Theres Nerell	10-0	November 11, 2002	2002 World Championship	(Greece) Chalkida
Win	7-0	(Canada) Jennifer Ryz	11-0	November 11, 2002	2002 World Championship	(Greece) Chalkida
Win	6-0	(Spain) Minerva Perez	10-1	November 11, 2002	2002 World Championship	(Greece) Chalkida
Win	5-0	(Ukraine) Tatyana Lazareva	3-0	November 11, 2002	2002 World Championship	(Greece) Chalkida
2002 Asian Games champion at 55kg
Win	4-0	(South Korea) Lee Na-lae	11-1	October 6, 2002	2002 Asian Games	(South Korea) Busan
Win	3-0	(India) Alka Tomar	10-0	October 6, 2002	2002 Asian Games	(South Korea) Busan
Win	2-0	(Mongolia) Naidangiin Otgonjargal	7-0	October 6, 2002	2002 Asian Games	(South Korea) Busan
Win	1-0	(China) Sun Dongmei	10-0	October 6, 2002	2002 Asian Games	(South Korea) Busan

== Championships and accomplishments ==
- Tokyo Sports
  - Wrestling Special Award (2002, 2003, 2004, 2006, 2009, 2011, 2012, 2013, 2014, 2015)

== See also ==
- List of multiple Olympic gold medalists
- List of multiple Olympic gold medalists in one event
- List of multiple Olympic medalists in one event
- List of multiple Summer Olympic medalists

Olympic Games
Preceded by Ai Fukuhara	Flagbearer for Japan; London 2012	Succeeded by Keisuke Ushiro
