= 2006 World Wrestling Championships – Women's freestyle 55 kg =

Women's freestyle 55 kg at the 2006 World Championships
- Venue: Tianhe Gymnasium
- Dates: 30 September 2006
- Competitors: 27 from 27 nations

Medalists
gold medal	Saori Yoshida	Japan
silver medal	Mariya Yahorava	Belarus
bronze medal	Minerva Montero	Spain
bronze medal	Ida-Theres Karlsson	Sweden

The women's freestyle 55 kilograms is a competition featured at the 2006 World Wrestling Championships, and was held at the Tianhe Gymnasium in Guangzhou, China on 30 September 2006.

This freestyle wrestling competition consists of a single-elimination tournament, with a repechage used to determine the winner of two bronze medals.

== Results ==
Legend

- F — Won by fall

=== Final ===
Final
Mariya Yahorava (BLR)	0	0
Saori Yoshida (JPN)	7	6

=== Top half ===
Round of 32
Sofia Poumpouridou (GRE)	0	4	1
Jessica Bechtel (GER)	3	0	1
Tina George (USA)	0	2	0
Nghiêm Thị Giang (VIE)	4	1	1
Ainur Artikbaeva (UZB)	1	0
Geeta Phogat (IND)	8	6^{F}

Round of 16
Su Ying-tzu (TPE)	2	2
Lee Yeon-mi (KOR)	2	4
Mariya Yahorava (BLR)	1	1	1
Minerva Montero (ESP)	4	0	0
Georgiana Paic (ROM)	1	1	0
Jessica Bechtel (GER)	0	1	2
Nghiêm Thị Giang (VIE)	0	3
Geeta Phogat (IND)	4	4

Quarterfinals
Lee Yeon-mi (KOR)	0
Mariya Yahorava (BLR)	4^{F}
Jessica Bechtel (GER)	7	1	3
Geeta Phogat (IND)	0	4	2

Semifinals
Mariya Yahorava (BLR)	1	2
Jessica Bechtel (GER)	0	0

=== Bottom half ===
Round of 32
Natalia Golts (RUS)	4^{F}
Zeynep Yıldırım (TUR)	0
Saori Yoshida (JPN)	4	2
Marcia Andrades (VEN)	3	0
Anna Gomis (FRA)	3	3
Nadine Tokar (SUI)	0	0
Kitti Godó (HUN)	0	0
Sandra Roa (COL)	2	1
Olena Malyshko (UKR)	0	0
Tonya Verbeek (CAN)	5	6
Ida-Theres Karlsson (SWE)	4^{F}
Nurzat Shailobaeva (KGZ)	0
Naidangiin Otgonjargal (MGL)	1	1	2
Kim Un-a (PRK)	0	2	0
Miruyert Dynbayeva (KAZ)	1	0
Li Songni (CHN)	7	7

Round of 16
Natalia Golts (RUS)	0	0
Saori Yoshida (JPN)	5	3
Anna Gomis (FRA)	2	3
Sandra Roa (COL)	0	2
Tonya Verbeek (CAN)	1	0
Ida-Theres Karlsson (SWE)	3	4
Naidangiin Otgonjargal (MGL)	1	1
Li Songni (CHN)	1	0

Quarterfinals
Saori Yoshida (JPN)	1	2
Anna Gomis (FRA)	0	1
Ida-Theres Karlsson (SWE)	1	1
Naidangiin Otgonjargal (MGL)	0	0

Semifinals
Saori Yoshida (JPN)	4	6
Ida-Theres Karlsson (SWE)	0	3

=== Repechage ===
Repechage round 1
Marcia Andrades (VEN)	0	0
Natalia Golts (RUS)	4	2

Repechage round 2
Minerva Montero (ESP)	3^{F}
Lee Yeon-mi (KOR)	3
Natalia Golts (RUS)	5	4
Anna Gomis (FRA)	0	0

Bronze medals
Minerva Montero (ESP)	2	2
Jessica Bechtel (GER)	0	1
Natalia Golts (RUS)	0	0
Ida-Theres Karlsson (SWE)	4	5
