= 2013 World Wrestling Championships – Women's freestyle 55 kg =

Women's freestyle 55 kg at the 2013 World Championships
- Venue: László Papp Budapest Sports Arena
- Dates: 19 September 2013
- Competitors: 28 from 28 nations

Medalists
gold medal	Saori Yoshida	Japan
silver medal	Sofia Mattsson	Sweden
bronze medal	Emese Barka	Hungary
bronze medal	Valeria Koblova	Russia

The women's freestyle 55 kilograms is a competition featured at the 2013 World Wrestling Championships, and was held at the László Papp Budapest Sports Arena in Budapest, Hungary on 19 September 2013.

This freestyle wrestling competition consisted of a single-elimination tournament, with a repechage used to determine the winners of two bronze medals.

== Results ==
Legend

- F — Won by fall

=== Final ===
Final
Sofia Mattsson (SWE)	0
Saori Yoshida (JPN)	5

=== Top half ===
Round of 32
Katsiaryna Hanchar (BLR)	0
Mimi Hristova (BUL)	8
Liliya Shakirova (UZB)	0
Sofia Mattsson (SWE)	7
Phạm Thị Huệ (VIE)	4
Lenka Martináková (CZE)	1
Helen Maroulis (USA)	12^{F}
Han Kum-ok (PRK)	8

Round of 16
Bediha Gün (TUR)	8
Nicloe Hauptmann (GER)	0
Emese Barka (HUN)	4^{F}
Koria Pouri-Lane (NZL)	0
Mimi Hristova (BUL)	0
Sofia Mattsson (SWE)	7
Phạm Thị Huệ (VIE)	1
Helen Maroulis (USA)	6^{F}

Quarterfinals
Bediha Gün (TUR)	0
Emese Barka (HUN)	8
Sofia Mattsson (SWE)	7
Helen Maroulis (USA)	6

Semifinals
Emese Barka (HUN)	0
Sofia Mattsson (SWE)	10

=== Bottom half ===
Round of 32
Alma Valencia (MEX)	0
Aizhan Ismagulova (KAZ)	8
Sündeviin Byambatseren (MGL)	4
Zhong Xuechun (CHN)	3
Saori Yoshida (JPN)	8
Ana Maria Pavăl (ROU)	0
Valeria Koblova (RUS)	5
Mariana Eșanu (MDA)	2
Jillian Gallays (CAN)	7
Aurélie Basset (FRA)	0
Pooja Dhanda (IND)	0
Iryna Husyak (UKR)	8
Marwa Amri (TUN)	15
Um Ji-eun (KOR)	6
Maria Prevolaraki (GRE)	5
Katarzyna Krawczyk (POL)	2

Round of 16
Aizhan Ismagulova (KAZ)	0
Sündeviin Byambatseren (MGL)	7
Saori Yoshida (JPN)	7
Valeria Koblova (RUS)	0
Jillian Gallays (CAN)	0
Iryna Husyak (UKR)	10
Marwa Amri (TUN)	5
Maria Prevolaraki (GRE)	6

Quarterfinals
Sündeviin Byambatseren (MGL)	0
Saori Yoshida (JPN)	8
Iryna Husyak (UKR)	4^{F}
Maria Prevolaraki (GRE)	2

Semifinals
Saori Yoshida (JPN)	8
Iryna Husyak (UKR)	0

=== Repechage ===
Repechage round 1
Liliya Shakirova (UZB)	0
Mimi Hristova (BUL)	3^{F}
Ana Maria Pavăl (ROU)	3
Valeria Koblova (RUS)	12

Repechage round 2
Mimi Hristova (BUL)	3^{F}
Helen Maroulis (USA)	0
Valeria Koblova (RUS)	4
Sündeviin Byambatseren (MGL)	3

Bronze medals
Mimi Hristova (BUL)	0
Emese Barka (HUN)	3^{F}
Valeria Koblova (RUS)	8
Iryna Husyak (UKR)	0
