= 2008 World Wrestling Championships – Women's freestyle 55 kg =

Women's freestyle 55 kg at the 2008 World Championships
- Venue: Yoyogi National Gymnasium
- Dates: 13 October 2008
- Competitors: 23 from 23 nations

Medalists
gold medal	Saori Yoshida	Japan
silver medal	Tetyana Lazareva	Ukraine
bronze medal	Brittanee Laverdure	Canada
bronze medal	Tatiana Suarez	United States

The women's freestyle 55 kilograms is a competition featured at the 2008 World Wrestling Championships, and was held at the Yoyogi National Gymnasium in Tokyo, Japan on 13 October.

This freestyle wrestling competition consists of a single-elimination tournament, with a repechage used to determine the winner of two bronze medals.

== Results ==
Legend

- F — Won by fall
- R — Retired

=== Final ===
Final
Saori Yoshida (JPN)	1	5
Tetyana Lazareva (UKR)	0	0^{R}

=== Top half ===
Round of 32

Round of 16
Naidangiin Otgonjargal (MGL)	4^{F}
Nicky Mobunga (COD)	0
Brittanee Laverdure (CAN)	1	1
Sun Dongmei (CHN)	0	0
Saori Yoshida (JPN)	6^{F}
Kamlesh Devi (IND)	0
Anna Zwirydowska (POL)	2	2
Valentina Minguzzi (ITA)	0	0

Quarterfinals
Naidangiin Otgonjargal (MGL)	1	1	0
Brittanee Laverdure (CAN)	0	1	1
Saori Yoshida (JPN)	2^{F}
Anna Zwirydowska (POL)	0

Semifinals
Brittanee Laverdure (CAN)	0
Saori Yoshida (JPN)	4^{F}

=== Bottom half ===
Round of 32
Lee Chiu-ping (TPE)	0	2
Zeynep Yıldırım (TUR)	1	2
Nadya Gradyuk (AZE)	4
Enid Rivera (PUR)	3^{F}
Tatiana Suarez (USA)	4	1
Sofia Poumpouridou (GRE)	1	0
Trần Thị Hạnh (VIE)	0	0
Ana Maria Pavăl (ROU)	6	7
Ainur Artikbaeva (UZB)	3	3^{F}
Jacira Mendonca (GBS)	6	1
Miruyert Dynbayeva (KAZ)	1	0
Natalia Smirnova (RUS)	8	7
Nurzat Shailobaeva (KGZ)	0
Tetyana Lazareva (UKR)	6^{F}

Round of 16
Tatsiana Hryhoryeva (BLR)	3^{F}
Zeynep Yıldırım (TUR)	0
Enid Rivera (PUR)	0	0
Tatiana Suarez (USA)	1	7^{F}
Ana Maria Pavăl (ROU)	8^{F}
Ainur Artikbaeva (UZB)	2
Natalia Smirnova (RUS)	1	0
Tetyana Lazareva (UKR)	7	3

Quarterfinals
Tatsiana Hryhoryeva (BLR)	2
Tatiana Suarez (USA)	5^{F}
Ana Maria Pavăl (ROU)	2	0	0
Tetyana Lazareva (UKR)	0	1	1

Semifinals
Tatiana Suarez (USA)	1	1
Tetyana Lazareva (UKR)	2	3

=== Repechage ===
Repechage round 1
Nurzat Shailobaeva (KGZ)	4
Natalia Smirnova (RUS)	6^{F}

Repechage round 2
Kamlesh Devi (IND)	2	2
Anna Zwirydowska (POL)	4	3
Natalia Smirnova (RUS)	1	0
Ana Maria Pavăl (ROU)	2	3

Bronze medals
Anna Zwirydowska (POL)	1	3
Brittanee Laverdure (CAN)	0	0
Ana Maria Pavăl (ROU)	2	2	0
Tatiana Suarez (USA)	0	3	2^{F}

- Anna Zwirydowska of Poland originally won the bronze medal, but was disqualified after she tested positive for doping. Brittanee Laverdure was raised to third and took the bronze medal.
