= Helen Maroulis =

American freestyle wrestler (born 1991)

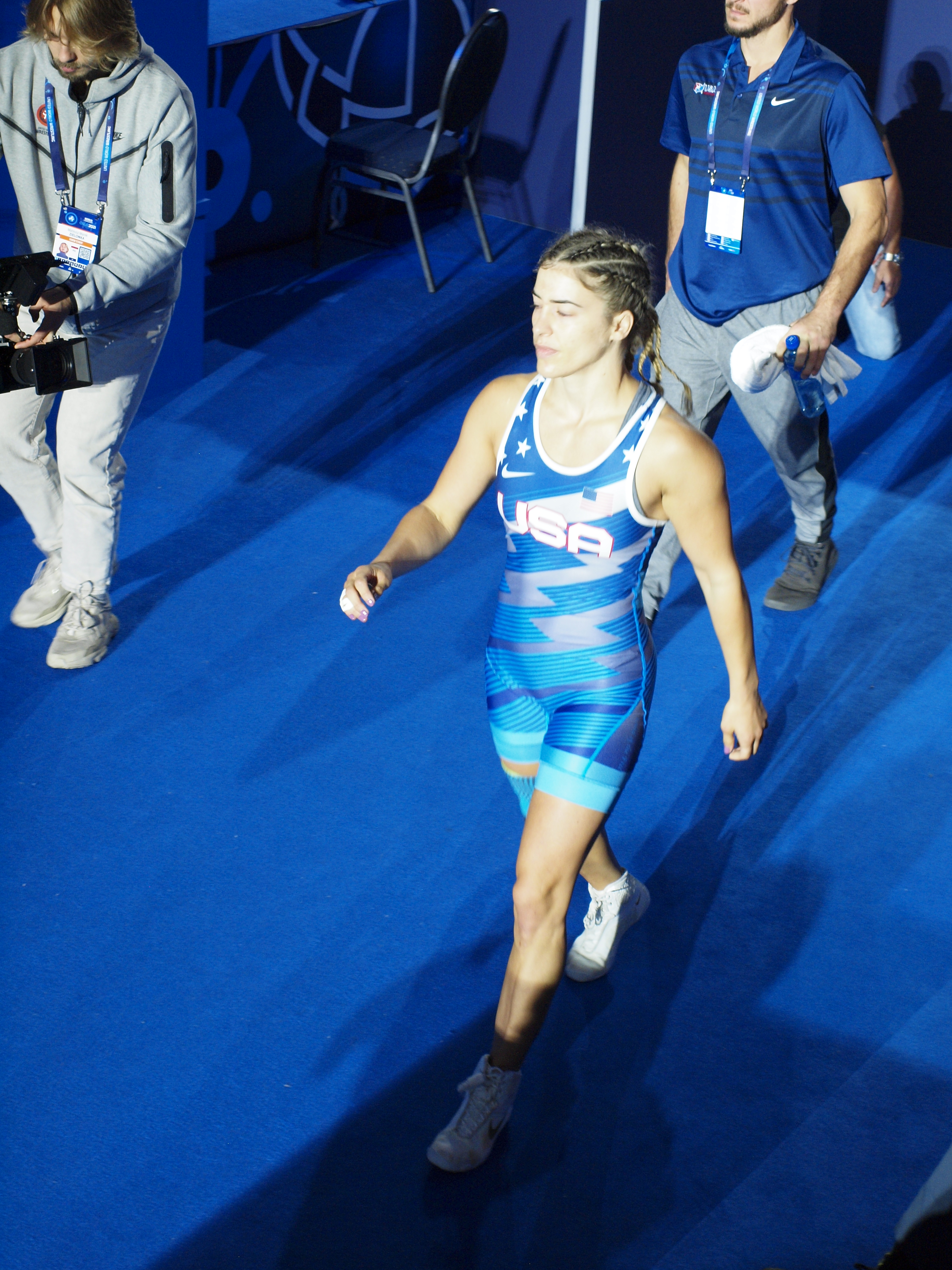
- Picture from the 2021 World Wrestling Championships – Day 5

Personal information
- Full name: Helen Louise Maroulis
- Born: September 19, 1991 (age 35) Rockville, Maryland, U.S.
- Education: Simon Fraser University
- Height: 5 ft 3 in (160 cm)
- Website: helenmaroulis.com

Sport
- Country: United States
- Sport: Wrestling
- Weight class: 57 kg
- Event: Freestyle
- Club: Sunkist Kids Wrestling Club
- Coached by: Terry Steiner
Medal record
Women's freestyle wrestling
Representing the United States
Olympic Games
Gold medal – first place	2016 Rio de Janeiro	53 kg
Bronze medal – third place	2020 Tokyo	57 kg
Bronze medal – third place	2024 Paris	57 kg
World Championships
Gold medal – first place	2015 Las Vegas	55 kg
Gold medal – first place	2017 Paris	58 kg
Gold medal – first place	2021 Oslo	57 kg
Gold medal – first place	2025 Zagreb	57 kg
Silver medal – second place	2012 Canada	55 kg
Silver medal – second place	2022 Belgrade	57 kg
Bronze medal – third place	2014 Tashkent	55 kg
Bronze medal – third place	2023 Belgrade	57 kg
Bronze medal – third place	2026 Astana	57 kg
World Cup
Gold medal – first place	2013 Ulan-Baatar	55 kg
Silver medal – second place	2009 Taiyuan	51 kg
Pan American Games
Gold medal – first place	2011 Guadalajara	55 kg
Pan American Championships
Gold medal – first place	2012 Colorado Springs	55 kg
Gold medal – first place	2024 Acapulco	57 kg
Bronze medal – third place	2009 Maracaibo	55 kg
Golden Grand Prix
Gold medal – first place	2015 Baku	53 kg
Bronze medal – third place	2014 Baku	55 kg
Bronze medal – third place	2013 Baku	55 kg
Bronze medal – third place	2010 Klippan	55 kg
Golden Grand Prix Ivan Yarygin
Gold medal – first place	2022 Krasnoyarsk	57 kg
Grand Prix
Gold medal – first place	2025 Budapest	57 kg
World Juniors Championships
Silver medal – second place	2011 Bucharest	55 kg
Bronze medal – third place	2010 Budapest	55 kg
Bronze medal – third place	2008 Istanbul	51 kg

Helen Louise Maroulis (/məˈruːlɪs/ mə-ROO-liss; born September 19, 1991) is an American freestyle wrestler who competes in the women's 55-kg, 53-kg, and 57-kg categories. She has won four gold medals at the World Championships, the first in 2015 and most recently in 2025. At the 2016 Summer Olympics in Rio de Janeiro, Brazil, she became the first-ever American to win a gold medal in women's freestyle wrestling at the Olympic Games.

She currently competes in the Bantamweight division of Real American Freestyle (RAF), where she is the current RAF Women's Bantamweight Champion.

The Anthony-Maroulis Trophy is named after Maroulis and Victoria Anthony, and is awarded annually to the top performer in women's college wrestling.

== Background ==
Maroulis was born in Rockville, Maryland, the daughter of Paula and Yiannis "John" Maroulis. Her father is Greek. She attended Magruder High School for three years, where as a freshman she became the first female wrestler to place at the Maryland state wrestling championships. Maroulis was also named Most Outstanding Wrestler of a tournament, by pinning a senior boy who had won the year before, and finished high school with 99 career victories.

== Career ==
=== College ===
She then moved to Marquette Senior High School in Marquette, Michigan and then went to join Missouri Baptist University women's wrestling team in Saint Louis, Missouri, before ultimately transferring to compete for Simon Fraser University in Burnaby, British Columbia, Canada. At the age-group level, Maroulis was a three-time Junior World medalist (bronze in 2008 & 2010, silver in 2011).

As of 2014, she trained at the U.S. Olympic Education Center at Northern Michigan University.

=== Rio Summer Olympics 2016 ===
Maroulis beat Japan's Saori Yoshida 4–1 to win a gold medal at the 2016 Rio Olympics. This was the first Olympic gold medal for the United States in a women's wrestling event.

=== World Championship 2017 ===
Maroulis won her third consecutive gold medal at the world championships or Olympics, defeating Olympic bronze medalist Marwa Amri of Tunisia in the final of the 58-kilogram/128-pound weight class with an 11-0 technical fall.

=== Pro Wrestling League ===
On January 16, 2018, Pooja Dhanda defeated Maroulis in the Pro Wrestling League.

=== World Championship 2018 ===
Maroulis was defeated in the first round by fall by Azerbaijan's Alyona Kolesnik, a shocking upset for the defending world and Olympic champion. The defeat was attributed to a serious head injury (a concussion from a tournament in January 2018). As Maroulis stated in post-match interview, "I'm so used to telling someone, hey, don't touch my head." The injury caused Maroulis to delay her world team qualifier match, and significantly limited her live sparring prior to the event. It was reported she was so limited by the injury that she only returned to live practice about 10 days before her rescheduled qualifying series.

=== Tokyo Summer Olympics 2020 ===
Maroulis won a bronze medal by defeating Mongolia's Khongorzul Boldsaikhan after controversially losing to Risako Kawai of Japan in the 57 kg semifinals. With the bronze medal, Maroulis became the first female wrestler in U.S. history to win two Olympic medals.

=== Ivan Yariguin Grand Prix 2022 ===
Maroulis won a gold medal in the 57 kg final by forfeit as her opponent Olga Khoroshavtseva of Russia withdrew.

=== Pan American Championships 2024 ===
In 2024, she won the gold medal in the women's 57 kg event at the Pan American Wrestling Championships held in Acapulco, Mexico. She defeated Giullia Penalber of Brazil in her gold medal match.

=== Paris Summer Olympics 2024 ===
In 2024, she became the first female American wrestler to have qualified for three Olympics, upon qualifying for the 2024 Olympics. She qualified for the Olympics at the 2024 United States Olympic trials held in State College, Pennsylvania.

On August 9, 2024, she won the bronze medal in the 57 kg women's freestyle wrestling event with a victory over Hannah Taylor of Canada.

=== IBJJF No Gi World Championship 2024 ===
Maroulis made her Brazilian jiu-jitsu debut at the IBJJF No Gi World Championship 2024, where she competed in the lightweight blue belt division. She won all five matches and a took a gold medal in her weight class.

=== Real American Freestyle ===
She signed with Real American Freestyle (RAF), and defeated Samantha Stewart at RAF 02 on October 25, 2025 to become the inaugural RAF Women's Flyweight Champion. Maroulis successfully defended the renamed title, now called the RAF Women's Bantamweight Championship, against Alexis Janiak at RAF 08 on April 18, 2026. She will defend the RAF Women's Bantamweight Championship against Anhelina Lysak at RAF Georgia on July 11, 2026.

== Match results ==
World Championships & Olympics
Res.	Record	Opponent	Score	Date	Event	Location
2024 Olympic (bronze) at 57 kg
Win	35-8	(Canada) Hannah Taylor	4-0	August 9, 2024	2024 Summer Olympics	(France) Paris
Loss	34-8	(Japan) Tsugumi Sakurai	4–10	August 8, 2024	2024 Summer Olympics	(France) Paris
Win	34-7	(Ukraine) Alina Hrushyna	7-4	August 8, 2024	2024 Summer Olympics	(France) Paris
Win	33-7	(India) Anshu Malik	7-2	August 8, 2024	2024 Summer Olympics	(France) Paris
2021 UWW world (gold) at 57 kg
Win	32-7	(India) Anshu Malik	Fall	October 7, 2021	2021 World Championship	(Norway) Oslo
Win	31-7	(Russia) Veronika Chumikova	10–1	October 6, 2021	2021 World Championship	(Norway) Oslo
Win	30-7	(Austria) Jeannie Kessler	Fall	October 6, 2021	2021 World Championship	(Norway) Oslo
2020 Olympic (bronze) at 57 kg
Win	29-7	(Mongolia) Boldsaikhan Khongorzul	11-0	August 5, 2021	2020 Summer Olympics	(Japan) Tokyo
Loss	28-7	(Japan) Risako Kawai	1–2	August 4, 2021	2020 Summer Olympics	(Japan) Tokyo
Win	28-6	(Ukraine) Tetyana Kit	8-0	August 4, 2021	2020 Summer Olympics	(Japan) Tokyo
Win	27-6	(China) Rong Ningning	8-4	August 4, 2021	2020 Summer Olympics	(Japan) Tokyo
2018 UWW world 21st at 57 kg
Loss	26-7	(Azerbaijan) Alyona Kolesnik	Fall	October 24, 2018	2018 World Championships	(Hungary) Budapest
2017 UWW world (gold) at 58 kg
Win	26-6	(Tunisia) Marwa Amri	11-0	August 23, 2017	2017 World Championship	(France) Paris
Win	25-6	(Canada) Michelle Fazzari	10-0	August 23, 2017	2017 World Championship	(France) Paris
Win	24-6	(Dominican Republic) Yessica Oviedo	11-0	August 23, 2017	2017 World Championship	(France) Paris
Win	23-6	(Sweden) Elin Nilsson	10-0	August 23, 2017	2017 World Championship	(France) Paris
Win	22-6	(South Korea) Hanbit Kim	10-0	August 23, 2017	2017 World Championship	(France) Paris
2016 Olympic (gold) at 53 kg
Win	21-6	(Japan) Saori Yoshida	4-1	August 18, 2016	2016 Summer Olympics	(Brazil) Rio de Janeiro
Win	20-6	(Sweden) Sofia Mattsson	Fall	August 18, 2016	2016 Summer Olympics	(Brazil) Rio de Janeiro
Win	19-6	(North Korea) Jong Myong-suk	7-4	August 18, 2016	2016 Summer Olympics	(Brazil) Rio de Janeiro
Win	18-6	(China) Zhong Xuechun	10-0	August 18, 2016	2016 Summer Olympics	(Brazil) Rio de Janeiro
Win	17-6	(Ukraine) Yuliya Khalvadzhy	12-1	August 18, 2016	2016 Summer Olympics	(Brazil) Rio de Janeiro
2015 UWW world (gold) at 55 kg
Win	16-6	(Russia) Irina Ologonova	11-0	September 10, 2015	2015 World Championship	(United States) Las Vegas, NV
Win	15-6	(China) Pang Qianyu	5-0	September 10, 2015	2015 World Championship	(United States) Las Vegas, NV
Win	14-6	(Bulgaria) Evelina Nikolova	fall	September 10, 2015	2015 World Championship	(United States) Las Vegas, NV
Win	13-6	(Mexico) Brenda Fernández	10-0	September 10, 2015	2015 World Championship	(United States) Las Vegas, NV
2014 UWW world (bronze) at 55 kg
Win	12-6	(Poland) Katarzyna Krawczyk	10-0	September 10, 2014	2014 World Championship	(Uzbekistan) Tashkent
Loss	11-6	(Japan) Chiho Hamada	2-6	September 10, 2014	2014 World Championship	(Uzbekistan) Tashkent
Win	11-5	(Mongolia) Altansetsegiin Battsetseg	fall	September 10, 2014	2014 World Championship	(Uzbekistan) Tashkent
Win	10-5	(Nicaragua) Elverine Jiménez	fall	September 10, 2014	2014 World Championship	(Uzbekistan) Tashkent
2013 UWW world 7th at 55 kg
Loss	9-5	(Bulgaria) Mimi Hristova	fall	September 19, 2013	2013 World Championship	(Hungary) Budapest
Loss	9-4	(Sweden) Sofia Mattsson	6-7	September 19, 2013	2013 World Championship	(Hungary) Budapest
Win	9-3	(Vietnam) Phạm Thị Huệ	fall	September 19, 2013	2013 World Championship	(Hungary) Budapest
Win	8-3	(North Korea) Han Kum-ok	fall	September 19, 2013	2013 World Championship	(Hungary) Budapest
2012 UWW world (silver) at 55 kg
Loss	7-3	(Japan) Saori Yoshida	fall	September 28, 2012	2012 World Championship	(Canada) Strathcona County, Alberta
Win	7-2	(Canada) Brittanee Laverdure	5-0, 4-2	September 28, 2012	2012 World Championship	(Canada) Strathcona County, Alberta
Win	6-2	(Greece) Maria Prevolaraki	3-0, 2-0	September 28, 2012	2012 World Championship	(Canada) Strathcona County, Alberta
Win	5-2	(Belarus) Nadzeya Mikhalkova	fall	September 28, 2012	2012 World Championship	(Canada) Strathcona County, Alberta
2011 UWW world 5th at 55 kg
Loss	4-2	(Sweden) Ida-Theres Nerell	fall	September 15, 2011	2011 World Championship	(Turkey) Istanbul
Win	4-1	(Mexico) Alma Valencia	5-0, 4-0	September 15, 2011	2011 World Championship	(Turkey) Istanbul
Win	3-1	(Turkey) Emriye Musta	6-2, 6-2	September 15, 2011	2011 World Championship	(Turkey) Istanbul
Loss	2-1	(Japan) Saori Yoshida	fall	September 15, 2011	2011 World Championship	(Turkey) Istanbul
Win	2–0	(Bulgaria) Valya Trandeva	fall	September 15, 2011	2011 World Championship	(Turkey) Istanbul
Win	1–0	(Kazakhstan) Aiyim Abdildina	6-0, 5-2	September 15, 2011	2011 World Championship	(Turkey) Istanbul

== Personal life ==
Maroulis converted to Christianity while in college, and found comfort in religion after failing to qualify for the 2012 Summer Olympics.

Her grandparents emigrated to the United States from the Greek island Kalamos in the 1960s. Maroulis visited her father's island a few weeks after her victory at Rio, and was given an award by the local community.

USA Wrestling's Women's College Wrestler of the Year award was renamed the Anthony-Maroulis Trophy to honor Maroulis and Victoria Anthony in 2026.

Achievements
New championship	1st RAF Women's Bantamweight Champion; October 25, 2025 – present	Incumbent
