= 2005 World Wrestling Championships – Women's freestyle 59 kg =

Women's freestyle 59 kg at the 2005 World Championships
- Venue: László Papp Budapest Sports Arena
- Dates: 29 September 2005
- Competitors: 24 from 24 nations

Medalists
gold medal	Ayako Shoda	Japan
silver medal	Marianna Sastin	Hungary
bronze medal	Sally Roberts	United States
bronze medal	Lene Aanes	Norway

The women's freestyle 59 kilograms is a competition featured at the 2005 World Wrestling Championships, and was held at the László Papp Budapest Sports Arena in Budapest, Hungary on 29 September 2005.

This freestyle wrestling competition consists of a single-elimination tournament, with a repechage used to determine the winner of two bronze medals.

== Results ==
Legend

- F — Won by fall

=== Final ===
Final
Marianna Sastin (HUN)	0	0
Ayako Shoda (JPN)	4	6

=== Top half ===
Round of 32

Round of 16
Stefanie Stüber (GER)	0	3	0
Diletta Giampiccolo (ITA)	1	0	1
Sally Roberts (USA)	7	7
Dorjiin Narmandakh (MGL)	0	0
Marianna Sastin (HUN)	2	2
Stephanie Maierhofer (AUT)	1	1
Georgiana Paic (ROM)	0	0
Anna Zwirydowska (POL)	1	1

Quarterfinals
Diletta Giampiccolo (ITA)	3	0	1
Sally Roberts (USA)	0	7	2
Marianna Sastin (HUN)	0	3	1
Anna Zwirydowska (POL)	1	1	0

Semifinals
Sally Roberts (USA)	4	6
Marianna Sastin (HUN)	7	7

=== Bottom half ===
Round of 32
Evangelia Chrysi (GRE)	0	0
Lene Aanes (NOR)	5	7
Eleonora Gigilashvili (GEO)	0
Yelena Komarova (UKR)	5^{F}
Ayako Shoda (JPN)	3	2
Alka Tomar (IND)	0	1
Yuliya Ratkevich (BLR)	4	3^{F}
Samia Bejaoui (TUN)	0	0
Ida-Theres Karlsson (SWE)	3	0	1
Kim Hee-jeong (KOR)	1	1	0
Audrey Prieto (FRA)	4	4
Viktoria Zagainova (RUS)	0	1
Sebastiana Jiménez (ESP)	0	0
Emily Richardson (CAN)	1	5
Yoselin Rojas (VEN)	1	1	0
Kristel van Ekelenburg (NED)	0	1	3

Round of 16
Lene Aanes (NOR)	3	1
Yelena Komarova (UKR)	0	0
Ayako Shoda (JPN)	4^{F}
Yuliya Ratkevich (BLR)	0
Ida-Theres Karlsson (SWE)	1	6	4^{F}
Audrey Prieto (FRA)	2	0	0
Emily Richardson (CAN)	3	5
Kristel van Ekelenburg (NED)	0	0

Quarterfinals
Lene Aanes (NOR)	0	0
Ayako Shoda (JPN)	1	1
Ida-Theres Karlsson (SWE)	3	2
Emily Richardson (CAN)	0	0

Semifinals
Ayako Shoda (JPN)	6^{F}
Ida-Theres Karlsson (SWE)	0

=== Repechage ===
Repechage round 1
Alka Tomar (IND)	4	3
Yuliya Ratkevich (BLR)	1	1

Repechage round 2
Stephanie Maierhofer (AUT)	0	0
Sylwia Bileńska (POL)	2	2
Alka Tomar (IND)	2	0
Lene Aanes (NOR)	4	6^{F}

Bronze medals
Sylwia Bileńska (POL)	0	2
Sally Roberts (USA)	7	6
Lene Aanes (NOR)	1	0	1
Ida-Theres Karlsson (SWE)	1	2	0
