= Wrestling at the 2011 Pan American Games – Women's freestyle 55 kg =

Women's Freestyle 55 kg at the 2011 Pan American Games
- Venue: CODE II Gymnasium
- Dates: October 22
- Competitors: 8 from 8 nations

Medalists
Gold medal	Helen Maroulis	United States
Silver medal	Tonya Verbeek	Canada
Bronze medal	Joice Silva	Brazil
Bronze medal	Lissette Antes	Ecuador

The women's freestyle 55 kg competition of the wrestling events at the 2011 Pan American Games in Guadalajara, Mexico, was held on October 22 at the CODE II Gymanasium. The defending champion was Jackeline Rentería from Colombia.

This freestyle wrestling competition consisted of a single-elimination tournament, with a repechage used to determine the winner of two bronze medals. The two finalists faced off for gold and silver medals. Each wrestler who lost to one of the two finalists moved into the repechage, culminating in a pair of bronze medal matches featuring the semifinal losers each facing the remaining repechage opponent from their half of the bracket.

Each bout consisted of up to three rounds, lasting two minutes apiece. The wrestler who scored more points in each round was the winner of that rounds; the bout finished when one wrestler had won two rounds (and thus the match).

== Schedule ==
All times are Central Standard Time (UTC-6).

Date	Time	Round
October 22, 2011	10:00	Quarterfinals
October 22, 2011	11:04	Semifinals
October 22, 2011	18:16	Bronze medal matches
October 22, 2011	18:24	Final

== Results ==
=== Main bracket ===
Quarterfinals
Helen Maroulis (USA)	0	4
Joice Silva (BRA)	1	0
Marcia Andrades (VEN)	3	1
Alma Valencia (MEX)	0	0
Enid Rivera (PUR)	0	0
Lissette Antes (ECU)	4	4
Jenny Mallqui (PER)	0	0
Tonya Verbeek (CAN)	1	1

Semifinals
Helen Maroulis (USA)	4	1
Marcia Andrades (VEN)	0	0
Lissette Antes (ECU)	0	0
Tonya Verbeek (CAN)	1	2

Finals
Helen Maroulis (USA)	1	0	3
Tonya Verbeek (CAN)	0	7	0

=== Repechage round ===
Two bronze medals were awarded.

Repechage round 1	Bronze Medal Bout
	Marcia Andrades (VEN)	0 0
Joice Silva (BRA)	Joice Silva (BRA)	1 1
Bye

Repechage round 1	Bronze Medal Bout
	Lissette Antes (ECU)	0 2 1
Jenny Mallqui (PER)	Jenny Mallqui (PER)	1 0 0
Bye
