= 2006 World Wrestling Championships – Women's freestyle 59 kg =

Women's freestyle 59 kg at the 2006 World Championships
- Venue: Tianhe Gymnasium
- Dates: 30 September 2006
- Competitors: 24 from 24 nations

Medalists
gold medal	Ayako Shoda	Japan
silver medal	Su Lihui	China
bronze medal	Alka Tomar	India
bronze medal	Nataliya Synyshyn	Ukraine

The women's freestyle 59 kilograms is a competition featured at the 2006 World Wrestling Championships, and was held at the Tianhe Gymnasium in Guangzhou, China on 30 September 2006.

This freestyle wrestling competition consists of a single-elimination tournament, with a repechage used to determine the winner of two bronze medals.

== Results ==
Legend

- F — Won by fall

=== Final ===
Final
Ayako Shoda (JPN)	1	2
Su Lihui (CHN)	0	0

=== Top half ===
Round of 32

Round of 16
Kristel van Ekelenburg (NED)	0	1
Ochirbatyn Nasanburmaa (MGL)	6	2
Ayako Shoda (JPN)	3	1	2
Alka Tomar (IND)	4	0	0
Sebastiana Jiménez (ESP)	3	1	0
Um Ji-eun (KOR)	1	1	1
Ludmila Cristea (MDA)	5	6
Audrey Prieto (FRA)	3	4

Quarterfinals
Ochirbatyn Nasanburmaa (MGL)	0
Ayako Shoda (JPN)	5^{F}
Um Ji-eun (KOR)	0
Ludmila Cristea (MDA)	4^{F}

Semifinals
Ayako Shoda (JPN)	4	2
Ludmila Cristea (MDA)	0	0

=== Bottom half ===
Round of 32
Birgit Stern (AUT)	0	0
Stefanie Stüber (GER)	1	2
Tatsiana Bokhan (BLR)	4^{F}
Try Sothavy (CAM)	0
Jackeline Rentería (COL)	4	6^{F}
Lin Chia-hua (TPE)	0	0
Marianna Sastin (HUN)	0	3	3
Johanna Mattsson (SWE)	1	0	0
Gudrun Høie (NOR)	3	6^{F}
Anchuli Srithanyarat (THA)	0	0
Gemma Silverio (PHI)	3
Erin Tomeo (USA)	4^{F}
Su Lihui (CHN)	7	5
Breanne Graham (CAN)	0	0
Nataliya Synyshyn (UKR)	6	6
Olga Cherkasheva (KAZ)	0	0

Round of 16
Stefanie Stüber (GER)	5	1
Tatsiana Bokhan (BLR)	0	0
Jackeline Rentería (COL)	3	1
Marianna Sastin (HUN)	3	6
Gudrun Høie (NOR)	2
Erin Tomeo (USA)	6^{F}
Su Lihui (CHN)	1	3	1
Nataliya Synyshyn (UKR)	1	0	0

Quarterfinals
Stefanie Stüber (GER)	0	0
Marianna Sastin (HUN)	1	1
Erin Tomeo (USA)	4	3	3
Su Lihui (CHN)	4	1	4

Semifinals
Marianna Sastin (HUN)	7	3	0
Su Lihui (CHN)	0	5	1

=== Repechage ===
Repechage round 1
Breanne Graham (CAN)	0	0
Nataliya Synyshyn (UKR)	3	1

Repechage round 2
Alka Tomar (IND)	4	4
Ochirbatyn Nasanburmaa (MGL)	0	1
Nataliya Synyshyn (UKR)	2	4
Erin Tomeo (USA)	0	1

Bronze medals
Alka Tomar (IND)	0	1	5
Ludmila Cristea (MDA)	5	0	2
Nataliya Synyshyn (UKR)	2	2
Marianna Sastin (HUN)	1	0
