= Wrestling at the 2006 Asian Games =

- Venue: Aspire Hall 4
- Dates: 9–14 December 2006
- Competitors: 236 from 28 nations

Wrestling was contested by men and women at the 2006 Asian Games in Doha, Qatar. Only men competed in Greco-Roman wrestling while both men and women contested for medals in freestyle wrestling. All competition were held from December 9 to December 14 at Aspire Hall 4.

== Schedule ==
P	Preliminary rounds & Repechage	F	Finals

Event↓/Date →	9th Sat		10th Sun		11th Mon		12th Tue	13th Wed		14th Thu	
Men's freestyle 55 kg										P	F
Men's freestyle 60 kg								P	F		
Men's freestyle 66 kg										P	F
Men's freestyle 74 kg								P	F		
Men's freestyle 84 kg										P	F
Men's freestyle 96 kg								P	F		
Men's freestyle 120 kg										P	F
Men's Greco-Roman 55 kg			P	F							
Men's Greco-Roman 60 kg	P	F									
Men's Greco-Roman 66 kg			P	F							
Men's Greco-Roman 74 kg	P	F									
Men's Greco-Roman 84 kg			P	F							
Men's Greco-Roman 96 kg	P	F									
Men's Greco-Roman 120 kg			P	F							
Women's freestyle 48 kg					P	F					
Women's freestyle 55 kg					P	F					
Women's freestyle 63 kg					P	F					
Women's freestyle 72 kg					P	F					

== Medalists ==
=== Men's freestyle ===
Event	Gold	Silver	Bronze
55 kg	Dilshod Mansurov; Uzbekistan	Jon Hyon-guk; North Korea	Kim Hyo-sub; South Korea
55 kg	Dilshod Mansurov; Uzbekistan	Jon Hyon-guk; North Korea	Hidenori Taoka; Japan
60 kg	Morad Mohammadi; Iran	Song Jae-myung; South Korea	Yogeshwar Dutt; India
60 kg	Morad Mohammadi; Iran	Song Jae-myung; South Korea	Ri Yong-chol; North Korea
66 kg	Baek Jin-kuk; South Korea	Takafumi Kojima; Japan	Buyanjavyn Batzorig; Mongolia
66 kg	Baek Jin-kuk; South Korea	Takafumi Kojima; Japan	Sushil Kumar; India
74 kg	Ali Asghar Bazri; Iran	Cho Byung-kwan; South Korea	Abdulkhakim Shapiyev; Kazakhstan
74 kg	Ali Asghar Bazri; Iran	Cho Byung-kwan; South Korea	Soslan Tigiev; Uzbekistan
84 kg	Reza Yazdani; Iran	Zaurbek Sokhiev; Uzbekistan	Noh Je-hyoun; South Korea
84 kg	Reza Yazdani; Iran	Zaurbek Sokhiev; Uzbekistan	Magomed Kurugliyev; Kazakhstan
96 kg	Alireza Heidari; Iran	Oleg Kallagov; Uzbekistan	Aleksey Krupnyakov; Kyrgyzstan
96 kg	Alireza Heidari; Iran	Oleg Kallagov; Uzbekistan	Taimuraz Tigiyev; Kazakhstan
120 kg	Artur Taymazov; Uzbekistan	Fardin Masoumi; Iran	Lee Se-hyung; South Korea
120 kg	Artur Taymazov; Uzbekistan	Fardin Masoumi; Iran	Palwinder Singh Cheema; India

=== Men's Greco-Roman ===
Event	Gold	Silver	Bronze
55 kg	Jiao Huafeng; China	Jasem Amiri; Iran	Vinayak Dalvi; India
55 kg	Jiao Huafeng; China	Jasem Amiri; Iran	Cha Kwang-su; North Korea
60 kg	Makoto Sasamoto; Japan	Sheng Jiang; China	Dilshod Aripov; Uzbekistan
60 kg	Makoto Sasamoto; Japan	Sheng Jiang; China	Ruslan Tyumenbayev; Kyrgyzstan
66 kg	Kim Min-chul; South Korea	Ravshan Ruzikulov; Uzbekistan	Hamid Reihani; Iran
66 kg	Kim Min-chul; South Korea	Ravshan Ruzikulov; Uzbekistan	Masaki Imuro; Japan
74 kg	Roman Melyoshin; Kazakhstan	Davoud Abedinzadeh; Iran	Bakhit Sharif Badr; Qatar
74 kg	Roman Melyoshin; Kazakhstan	Davoud Abedinzadeh; Iran	Daniar Kobonov; Kyrgyzstan
84 kg	Kim Jung-sub; South Korea	Yahia Abutabeekh; Jordan	Janarbek Kenjeev; Kyrgyzstan
84 kg	Kim Jung-sub; South Korea	Yahia Abutabeekh; Jordan	Shingo Matsumoto; Japan
96 kg	Han Tae-young; South Korea	Masoud Hashemzadeh; Iran	Gennady Chkhaidze; Uzbekistan
96 kg	Han Tae-young; South Korea	Masoud Hashemzadeh; Iran	Mohammad Al-Ken; Syria
120 kg	Kim Gwang-seok; South Korea	Mehdi Sharabiani; Iran	Nurbek Ibragimov; Kyrgyzstan
120 kg	Kim Gwang-seok; South Korea	Mehdi Sharabiani; Iran	Liu Deli; China

=== Women's freestyle ===
Event	Gold	Silver	Bronze
48 kg	Chiharu Icho; Japan	Kim Hyung-joo; South Korea	Tsogtbazaryn Enkhjargal; Mongolia
48 kg	Chiharu Icho; Japan	Kim Hyung-joo; South Korea	Li Xiaomei; China
55 kg	Saori Yoshida; Japan	Olga Smirnova; Kazakhstan	Alka Tomar; India
55 kg	Saori Yoshida; Japan	Olga Smirnova; Kazakhstan	Naidangiin Otgonjargal; Mongolia
63 kg	Kaori Icho; Japan	Geetika Jakhar; India	Badrakhyn Odonchimeg; Mongolia
63 kg	Kaori Icho; Japan	Geetika Jakhar; India	Xu Haiyan; China
72 kg	Wang Xu; China	Kyoko Hamaguchi; Japan	Yana Panova; Kyrgyzstan
72 kg	Wang Xu; China	Kyoko Hamaguchi; Japan	Ochirbatyn Burmaa; Mongolia

== Medal table ==
Rank	Nation	Gold	Silver	Bronze	Total
1	South Korea (KOR)	5	3	3	11
2	Iran (IRI)	4	5	1	10
3	Japan (JPN)	4	2	3	9
4	Uzbekistan (UZB)	2	3	3	8
5	China (CHN)	2	1	3	6
6	Kazakhstan (KAZ)	1	1	3	5
7	India (IND)	0	1	5	6
8	North Korea (PRK)	0	1	2	3
9	Jordan (JOR)	0	1	0	1
10	Kyrgyzstan (KGZ)	0	0	6	6
11	Mongolia (MGL)	0	0	5	5
12	Qatar (QAT)	0	0	1	1
12	Syria (SYR)	0	0	1	1
Totals (13 entries)		18	18	36	72

== Participating nations ==
A total of 236 athletes from 28 nations competed in wrestling at the 2006 Asian Games:

- Afghanistan (4)
- Cambodia (4)
- China (16)
- Chinese Taipei (3)
- India (18)
- Iran (14)
- Iraq (11)
- Japan (14)
- Jordan (2)
- Kazakhstan (18)
- Kyrgyzstan (18)
- Lebanon (3)
- Mongolia (11)
- Nepal (1)
- North Korea (8)
- Pakistan (3)
- Palestine (3)
- Philippines (7)
- Qatar (8)
- Saudi Arabia (4)
- South Korea (18)
- Syria (10)
- Tajikistan (5)
- Thailand (1)
- Turkmenistan (8)
- United Arab Emirates (2)
- Uzbekistan (14)
- Vietnam (8)
