= Wrestling at the 2016 Summer Olympics – Women's freestyle 58 kg =

Wrestling Event

Women's freestyle 58 kg at the Games of the XXXI Olympiad
- Venue: Carioca Arena 2
- Date: 17 August 2016
- Competitors: 20 from 20 nations

Medalists
1st place, gold medalist(s)		Kaori Icho	Japan
2nd place, silver medalist(s)		Valeria Koblova	Russia
3rd place, bronze medalist(s)		Marwa Amri	Tunisia
3rd place, bronze medalist(s)		Sakshi Malik	India

Women's freestyle 58 kilograms competition at the 2016 Summer Olympics in Rio de Janeiro, Brazil, took place on August 17 at the Carioca Arena 2 in Barra da Tijuca.

This freestyle wrestling competition consists of a single-elimination tournament, with a repechage used to determine the winner of two bronze medals. The two finalists face off for gold and silver medals. Each wrestler who loses to one of the two finalists moves into the repechage, culminating in a pair of bronze medal matches featuring the semifinal losers each facing the remaining repechage opponent from their half of the bracket.

The medals for the competition were presented by Habu Ahmed Gumel, International Olympic Committee member, Nigeria, and the gifts were presented by Pedro Gama Filho, United World Wrestling board member.

== Schedule ==
All times are Brasília Standard Time (UTC−03:00)

Date	Time	Event
17 August 2016	10:00	Qualification rounds
17 August 2016	16:00	Repechage
17 August 2016	17:00	Finals

== Results ==
Legend

- F — Won by fall

=== Final ===
Final
Kaori Icho (JPN)	3
Valeria Koblova (RUS)	2

=== Top half ===
Qualifications

1/8 finals
Kaori Icho (JPN)	11
Marwa Amri (TUN)	0
Michelle Fazzari (CAN)	1
Elif Jale Yeşilırmak (TUR)	3
Jackeline Rentería (COL)	6^{F}
Yanet Sovero (PER)	2
Oksana Herhel (UKR)	5
Yuliya Ratkevich (AZE)	7

1/4 finals
Kaori Icho (JPN)	3
Elif Jale Yeşilırmak (TUR)	1
Jackeline Rentería (COL)	3
Yuliya Ratkevich (AZE)	7

Semifinals
Kaori Icho (JPN)	10
Yuliya Ratkevich (AZE)	0

=== Bottom half ===
Qualifications
Lissette Antes (ECU)	0
Mariana Cherdivara (MDA)	3
Sakshi Malik (IND)	5
Johanna Mattsson (SWE)	4
Mimi Hristova (BUL)	4
Pürevdorjiin Orkhon (MGL)	7
Valeria Koblova (RUS)	9
Luisa Niemesch (GER)	0

1/8 finals
Petra Olli (FIN)	8
Aminat Adeniyi (NGR)	2
Joice Silva (BRA)	8
Aisuluu Tynybekova (KGZ)	11
Mariana Cherdivara (MDA)	5
Sakshi Malik (IND)	5
Pürevdorjiin Orkhon (MGL)	0
Valeria Koblova (RUS)	11

1/4 finals
Petra Olli (FIN)	7
Aisuluu Tynybekova (KGZ)	14
Sakshi Malik (IND)	2
Valeria Koblova (RUS)	9

Semifinals
Aisuluu Tynybekova (KGZ)	1
Valeria Koblova (RUS)	4

=== Repechage ===
Repechage round 1
Luisa Niemesch (GER)	0
Pürevdorjiin Orkhon (MGL)	7^{F}

Repechage round 2
Marwa Amri (TUN)	3
Elif Jale Yeşilırmak (TUR)	2
Pürevdorjiin Orkhon (MGL)	3
Sakshi Malik (IND)	12

Bronze medals
Marwa Amri (TUN)	6
Yuliya Ratkevich (AZE)	3
Sakshi Malik (IND)	8
Aisuluu Tynybekova (KGZ)	5

== Final standing ==
Rank	Athlete
1st place, gold medalist(s)	Kaori Icho (JPN)
2nd place, silver medalist(s)	Valeria Koblova (RUS)
3rd place, bronze medalist(s)	Marwa Amri (TUN)
3rd place, bronze medalist(s)	Sakshi Malik (IND)
5	Yuliya Ratkevich (AZE)
5	Aisuluu Tynybekova (KGZ)
7	Pürevdorjiin Orkhon (MGL)
8	Jackeline Rentería (COL)
9	Elif Jale Yeşilırmak (TUR)
10	Petra Olli (FIN)
11	Mariana Cherdivara (MDA)
12	Joice Silva (BRA)
13	Oksana Herhel (UKR)
14	Johanna Mattsson (SWE)
15	Mimi Hristova (BUL)
16	Aminat Adeniyi (NGR)
17	Michelle Fazzari (CAN)
18	Yanet Sovero (PER)
19	Lissette Antes (ECU)
20	Luisa Niemesch (GER)
