= 2012 World Wrestling Championships – Women's freestyle 55 kg =

Women's freestyle 55 kg at the 2012 World Championships
- Venue: Millennium Place
- Dates: 28 September 2012
- Competitors: 17 from 17 nations

Medalists
gold medal	Saori Yoshida	Japan
silver medal	Helen Maroulis	United States
bronze medal	Geeta Phogat	India
bronze medal	Maria Prevolaraki	Greece

The women's freestyle 55 kilograms is a competition featured at the 2012 World Wrestling Championships, and was held at the Millennium Place in Strathcona County, Alberta, Canada on 28 September 2012.

This freestyle wrestling competition consisted of a single-elimination tournament, with a repechage used to determine the winners of two bronze medals.

== Results ==
Legend

- F — Won by fall

=== Final ===
Final
Saori Yoshida (JPN)	2	4^{F}
Helen Maroulis (USA)	0	0

=== Top half ===
Round of 32

Round of 16
Ana Maria Pavăl (ROU)	0	0
Yang Chen (CHN)	3	5
Aurélie Basset (FRA)	0	1
Nataliya Synyshyn (UKR)	4	3
Geeta Phogat (IND)	0	1	2
Maria Gurova (RUS)	4	1	1
Saori Yoshida (JPN)	3^{F}
Akziya Dautbayeva (KAZ)	0

Quarterfinals
Yang Chen (CHN)	2	0
Nataliya Synyshyn (UKR)	4	1
Geeta Phogat (IND)	0	0
Saori Yoshida (JPN)	1	3^{F}

Semifinals
Nataliya Synyshyn (UKR)	4	0	0
Saori Yoshida (JPN)	0	1	3^{F}

=== Bottom half ===
Round of 32
Joice Silva (BRA)	5	1
Lenka Martináková (CZE)	0	0

Round of 16
Batbaataryn Nomin-Erdene (MGL)	1	1	0
Brittanee Laverdure (CAN)	0	1	1
Katarzyna Krawczyk (POL)	5	4^{F}
Yarina Dubovska (AZE)	1	0
Nadzeya Mikhalkova (BLR)	1	0
Helen Maroulis (USA)	3	2^{F}
Maria Prevolaraki (GRE)	0	4	2^{F}
Joice Silva (BRA)	1	2	1

Quarterfinals
Brittanee Laverdure (CAN)	1	0	3
Katarzyna Krawczyk (POL)	0	3	0
Helen Maroulis (USA)	3	2
Maria Prevolaraki (GRE)	0	0

Semifinals
Brittanee Laverdure (CAN)	0	2
Helen Maroulis (USA)	5	4

=== Repechage ===
Repechage round 2
Akziya Dautbayeva (KAZ)	1	0
Geeta Phogat (IND)	1	4
Nadzeya Mikhalkova (BLR)	0	0
Maria Prevolaraki (GRE)	1	2

Bronze medals
Geeta Phogat (IND)	1	1
Nataliya Synyshyn (UKR)	0	0
Maria Prevolaraki (GRE)	1	1
Brittanee Laverdure (CAN)	0	0
