= 2014 World Wrestling Championships – Women's freestyle 58 kg =

Women's freestyle 58 kg at the 2014 World Championships
- Venue: Gymnastics Sport Palace
- Dates: 11 September 2014
- Competitors: 23 from 23 nations

Medalists
gold medal	Kaori Icho	Japan
silver medal	Valeria Koblova	Russia
bronze medal	Anastasiya Huchok	Belarus
bronze medal	Elif Jale Yeşilırmak	Turkey

The Women's freestyle 58 kilograms is a competition featured at the 2014 World Wrestling Championships, and was held in Tashkent, Uzbekistan on 11 September 2014.

This freestyle wrestling competition consisted of a single-elimination tournament, with a repechage used to determine the winners of two bronze medals.

== Results ==
Legend

- F — Won by fall

=== Final ===
Final
Kaori Icho (JPN)	10
Valeria Koblova (RUS)	0

=== Top half ===
Round of 32

Round of 16
Anastasiya Huchok (BLR)	3
Anna Zwirydowska (POL)	0
Hanna Vasylenko (UKR)	2
Zhou Zhangting (CHN)	8
Alli Ragan (USA)	7
Aisuluu Tynybekova (KGZ)	6
Kaori Icho (JPN)	10^{F}
Asem Seydametova (UZB)	0

Quarterfinals
Anastasiya Huchok (BLR)	12
Zhou Zhangting (CHN)	3
Alli Ragan (USA)	0
Kaori Icho (JPN)	10

Semifinals
Anastasiya Huchok (BLR)	0
Kaori Icho (JPN)	11

=== Bottom half ===
Round of 32
Mimi Hristova (BUL)	6
Justine Bouchard (CAN)	1
Sarita Mor (IND)	2
Lissette Antes (ECU)	6^{F}
Irina Netreba (AZE)	4
Alejandra Romero (MEX)	1
Valeria Koblova (RUS)	12
Carola Rainero (ITA)	2
Joice Silva (BRA)	4
Tungalagiin Mönkhtuyaa (MGL)	6
Elif Jale Yeşilırmak (TUR)	10
Aizhan Ismagulova (KAZ)	0
Emese Barka (HUN)	9
Sandra Roa (COL)	6

Round of 16
Park Hye-sun (KOR)	4
Mimi Hristova (BUL)	10^{F}
Lissette Antes (ECU)	14
Irina Netreba (AZE)	6
Valeria Koblova (RUS)	10
Tungalagiin Mönkhtuyaa (MGL)	0
Elif Jale Yeşilırmak (TUR)	4
Emese Barka (HUN)	0

Quarterfinals
Mimi Hristova (BUL)	8
Lissette Antes (ECU)	8^{F}
Valeria Koblova (RUS)	9
Elif Jale Yeşilırmak (TUR)	0

Semifinals
Lissette Antes (ECU)	1
Valeria Koblova (RUS)	3

=== Repechage ===
Repechage round 1
Carola Rainero (ITA)	4
Tungalagiin Mönkhtuyaa (MGL)	14

Repechage round 2
Asem Seydametova (UZB)	0
Alli Ragan (USA)	10
Tungalagiin Mönkhtuyaa (MGL)	1
Elif Jale Yeşilırmak (TUR)	8

Bronze medals
Alli Ragan (USA)	4
Anastasiya Huchok (BLR)	4
Elif Jale Yeşilırmak (TUR)	8
Lissette Antes (ECU)	2
