= Wrestling at the 2012 Summer Olympics – Women's freestyle 55 kg =

Women's freestyle 55 kg at the Games of the XXX Olympiad
- Venue: ExCeL London
- Date: 9 August 2012
- Competitors: 19 from 19 nations

Medalists
1st place, gold medalist(s)		Saori Yoshida	Japan
2nd place, silver medalist(s)		Tonya Verbeek	Canada
3rd place, bronze medalist(s)		Jackeline Rentería	Colombia
3rd place, bronze medalist(s)		Yuliya Ratkevich	Azerbaijan

Women's freestyle 55 kilograms competition at the 2012 Summer Olympics in London, United Kingdom, took place on 9 August at ExCeL London.

This freestyle wrestling competition consists of a single-elimination tournament, with a repechage used to determine the winner of two bronze medals. The two finalists face off for gold and silver medals. Each wrestler who loses to one of the two finalists moves into the repechage, culminating in a pair of bronze medal matches featuring the semifinal losers each facing the remaining repechage opponent from their half of the bracket.

Each bout consists of up to three rounds, lasting two minutes apiece. The wrestler who scores more points in each round is the winner of that rounds; the bout ends when one wrestler has won two rounds (and thus the match).

== Schedule ==
All times are British Summer Time (UTC+01:00)

Date	Time	Event
9 August 2012	13:00	Qualification rounds
9 August 2012	17:45	Repechage
9 August 2012	18:40	Finals

== Results ==
Legend

- F — Won by fall

=== Final ===
Final
Tonya Verbeek (CAN)	0	0
Saori Yoshida (JPN)	3	2

=== Top half ===
Qualifications

1/8 finals
Olga Butkevych (GBR)	1	2	1
Lissette Antes (ECU)	1	0	2
Jackeline Rentería (COL)	3	2	4
Han Kum-ok (PRK)	6	2	2
Rabab Eid (EGY)	0
Tetyana Lazareva (UKR)	4^{F}
Tonya Verbeek (CAN)	1	0	3
Geeta Phogat (IND)	0	1	1

1/4 finals
Lissette Antes (ECU)	1	0	0
Jackeline Rentería (COL)	0	1	1
Tetyana Lazareva (UKR)	0	0
Tonya Verbeek (CAN)	1	1

Semifinals
Jackeline Rentería (COL)	0	0
Tonya Verbeek (CAN)	1	1

=== Bottom half ===
Qualification Rounds
Marcia Andrades (VEN)	0	0
Valeria Zholobova (RUS)	6	2
Sofia Mattsson (SWE)	5	2
Sündeviin Byambatseren (MGL)	0	0
Um Ji-eun (KOR)	1	0
Marwa Amri (TUN)	1	3^{F}

1/8 finals
Saori Yoshida (JPN)	1	1
Kelsey Campbell (USA)	0	0
Yuliya Ratkevich (AZE)	2	1
Maria Prevolaraki (GRE)	0	0
Joice Silva (BRA)	2	0	0
Valeria Zholobova (RUS)	0	1	1
Sofia Mattsson (SWE)	3	2
Marwa Amri (TUN)	0	0

1/4 finals
Saori Yoshida (JPN)	1	2
Yuliya Ratkevich (AZE)	0	0
Valeria Zholobova (RUS)	0	1	3
Sofia Mattsson (SWE)	1	1	3

Semifinals
Saori Yoshida (JPN)	1	2
Valeria Zholobova (RUS)	0	0

=== Repechage ===
Repechage round 2
Geeta Phogat (IND)	0	0
Tetyana Lazareva (UKR)	8	1
Kelsey Campbell (USA)	0	0
Yuliya Ratkevich (AZE)	4	1

Bronze medals
Tetyana Lazareva (UKR)	1	0	0
Jackeline Rentería (COL)	0	3	2
Yuliya Ratkevich (AZE)	6	2
Valeria Zholobova (RUS)	0	1

== Final standing ==
Rank	Athlete
1st place, gold medalist(s)	Saori Yoshida (JPN)
2nd place, silver medalist(s)	Tonya Verbeek (CAN)
3rd place, bronze medalist(s)	Jackeline Rentería (COL)
3rd place, bronze medalist(s)	Yuliya Ratkevich (AZE)
5	Tetyana Lazareva (UKR)
5	Valeria Zholobova (RUS)
7	Sofia Mattsson (SWE)
8	Marwa Amri (TUN)
9	Lissette Antes (ECU)
10	Han Kum-ok (PRK)
11	Olga Butkevych (GBR)
12	Joice Silva (BRA)
13	Geeta Phogat (IND)
14	Um Ji-eun (KOR)
15	Maria Prevolaraki (GRE)
16	Rabab Eid (EGY)
17	Kelsey Campbell (USA)
17	Sündeviin Byambatseren (MGL)
19	Marcia Andrades (VEN)
