= Wrestling at the 2002 Asian Games – Women's freestyle 55 kg =

Women's freestyle 55 kg at the 2002 Asian Games
- Venue: Yangsan Gymnasium
- Date: 6–7 October 2002
- Competitors: 5 from 5 nations

Medalists
gold medal	Saori Yoshida	Japan
silver medal	Lee Na-lae	South Korea
bronze medal	Naidangiin Otgonjargal	Mongolia

The women's freestyle 55 kilograms wrestling competition at the 2002 Asian Games in Busan was held on 6 October and 7 October at the Yangsan Gymnasium.

== Schedule ==
All times are Korea Standard Time (UTC+09:00)

Date	Time	Event
Sunday, 6 October 2002	10:00	Round 1
Sunday, 6 October 2002	16:00	Round 2
Sunday, 6 October 2002	16:00	Round 3
Monday, 7 October 2002	10:00	Round 4
Monday, 7 October 2002	16:00	Round 5

== Results ==
Legend

- WO — Won by walkover

Pos	Athlete	Pld	W	L	CP	TP
1	Saori Yoshida (JPN)	4	4	0	16	38
2	Lee Na-lae (KOR)	4	2	2	9	10
3	Naidangiin Otgonjargal (MGL)	4	2	2	8	8
4	Alka Tomar (IND)	4	1	3	5	14
5	Sun Dongmei (CHN)	4	1	3	3	11

Source: Report

	Score		CP
Alka Tomar (IND)	7–4	Naidangiin Otgonjargal (MGL)	3–1 PP
Saori Yoshida (JPN)	10–0	Sun Dongmei (CHN)	4–0 ST
Lee Na-lae (KOR)	2–2	Alka Tomar (IND)	3–1 PP
Naidangiin Otgonjargal (MGL)	0–7 Fall	Saori Yoshida (JPN)	0–4 TO
Sun Dongmei (CHN)	9–5	Alka Tomar (IND)	3–1 PP
Lee Na-lae (KOR)	2–4	Naidangiin Otgonjargal (MGL)	1–3 PP
Saori Yoshida (JPN)	10–0	Alka Tomar (IND)	4–0 ST
Sun Dongmei (CHN)	2–5 Fall	Lee Na-lae (KOR)	0–4 TO
Naidangiin Otgonjargal (MGL)	WO	Sun Dongmei (CHN)	4–0 PA
Saori Yoshida (JPN)	11–1	Lee Na-lae (KOR)	4–1 SP

== Final standing ==
Rank	Athlete
1st place, gold medalist(s)	Saori Yoshida (JPN)
2nd place, silver medalist(s)	Lee Na-lae (KOR)
3rd place, bronze medalist(s)	Naidangiin Otgonjargal (MGL)
4	Alka Tomar (IND)
5	Sun Dongmei (CHN)
