= Wrestling at the 2010 Asian Games – Women's freestyle 55 kg =

Women's freestyle 55 kg at the 2010 Asian Games
- Venue: Huagong Gymnasium
- Date: 26 November 2010
- Competitors: 11 from 11 nations

Medalists
gold medal	Saori Yoshida	Japan
silver medal	Zhang Lan	China
bronze medal	Aiyim Abdildina	Kazakhstan
bronze medal	Pak Yon-hui	North Korea

The women's freestyle 55 kilograms wrestling competition at the 2010 Asian Games in Guangzhou was held on 26 November 2010 at the Huagong Gymnasium.

This freestyle wrestling competition consisted of a single-elimination tournament, with a repechage used to determine the winner of two bronze medals. The two finalists faced off for gold and silver medals. Each wrestler who lost to one of the two finalists moved into the repechage, culminating in a pair of bronze medal matches featuring the semifinal losers each facing the remaining repechage opponent from their half of the bracket.

Each bout consisted of up to three rounds, lasting two minutes apiece. The wrestler who scored more points in each round was the winner of that rounds; the bout finished when one wrestler had won two rounds (and thus the match).

== Schedule ==
All times are China Standard Time (UTC+08:00)

Date	Time	Event
Friday, 26 November 2010	09:30	1/8 finals
Friday, 26 November 2010	09:30	Quarterfinals
Friday, 26 November 2010	09:30	Semifinals
Friday, 26 November 2010	16:00	Repechages
Friday, 26 November 2010	17:00	Finals

== Results ==
Legend

- F — Won by fall

=== Main bracket ===
1/8 finals
Batbaataryn Nomin-Erdene (MGL)	0	0
Saori Yoshida (JPN)	4	5
Um Ji-eun (KOR)	2	0
Geeta Phogat (IND)	2	2
Phạm Thị Huệ (VIE)	2	0
Pak Yon-hui (PRK)	7	3^{F}

Quarterfinals
Darunee Orain (THA)	0	0
Zhang Lan (CHN)	3	2
Aisuluu Tynybekova (KGZ)	0	0
Aiyim Abdildina (KAZ)	2	1
Liliya Shakirova (UZB)	0	0
Saori Yoshida (JPN)	1	7
Geeta Phogat (IND)	1	0
Pak Yon-hui (PRK)	3	7

Semifinals
Zhang Lan (CHN)	6	5
Aiyim Abdildina (KAZ)	4	3
Saori Yoshida (JPN)	4^{F}
Pak Yon-hui (PRK)	0

Final
Zhang Lan (CHN)	0	0
Saori Yoshida (JPN)	5	1

=== Repechage ===
Repechage round 1
Batbaataryn Nomin-Erdene (MGL)	2	0
Liliya Shakirova (UZB)	2	3^{F}

Bronze medals
Darunee Orain (THA)	0
Aiyim Abdildina (KAZ)	4^{F}
Liliya Shakirova (UZB)	0	5	1
Pak Yon-hui (PRK)	6	4	1

== Final standing ==
Rank	Athlete
1st place, gold medalist(s)	Saori Yoshida (JPN)
2nd place, silver medalist(s)	Zhang Lan (CHN)
3rd place, bronze medalist(s)	Aiyim Abdildina (KAZ)
3rd place, bronze medalist(s)	Pak Yon-hui (PRK)
5	Darunee Orain (THA)
5	Liliya Shakirova (UZB)
7	Geeta Phogat (IND)
8	Um Ji-eun (KOR)
9	Phạm Thị Huệ (VIE)
10	Batbaataryn Nomin-Erdene (MGL)
11	Aisuluu Tynybekova (KGZ)
