= Wrestling at the 2010 Commonwealth Games – Women's freestyle 59 kg =

The Women's freestyle 59 kg competition at the 2010 Commonwealth Games in New Delhi, India, was held on 8 October at the Indira Gandhi Arena.

== Medalists ==
Gold	Alka Tomar; India
Silver	Tonya Verbeek; Canada
Bronze	Tega Tosin Richard; Nigeria

=== Bracket ===
Quarterfinals
Louisa Salmon (ENG)
BYE
Alka Tomar (IND)
BYE
Kathryn Marsh (SCO)	0	0	0
Tonya Verbeek (CAN)	6	7	0
Tega Tosin Richard (NGR)	2	2	2
Carli Renzi (AUS)	3	0	0

Semifinals
Louisa Salmon (ENG)	0	0	0
Alka Tomar (IND)	4	0	0
Tonya Verbeek (CAN)	3	0	0
Tega Tosin Richard (NGR)	0	0	0

Finals
Alka Tomar (IND)	3	0	0
Tonya Verbeek (CAN)	2	0	0

=== Repechage ===
Quarterfinals	Semifinals				Bronze Medal Bout
	BYE
	Louisa Salmon (ENG)
					Louisa Salmon (ENG)	0	0	0
					Tega Tosin Richard (NGR)	1	4	0
	Tega Tosin Richard (NGR)	2	3	0
	Kathryn Marsh (SCO)	0	0	0
