= Anastasiya Huchok =

Belarusian wrestler

Medal record

Women's freestyle wrestling

Representing Belarus

World Championships
| Bronze medal – third place | 2014 Tashkent | 58 kg |

Military World Games
| Bronze medal – third place | 2019 Wuhan | 62 kg |

Anastasiya Huchok is a wrestler from Belarus. She won the bronze medal the 2014 World Wrestling Championships.
