= Tega Tosin Richard =

Nigerian wrestler

Tega Richard
Personal information
- Full name: Tega Tosin Richard
- Nationality: Nigerian
- Born: 13 November 1992 (age 33)

Sport
- Country: Nigeria
- Sport: wrestling
Medal record
Women's freestyle wrestling
Representing Nigeria
Commonwealth Games
Bronze medal – third place	2010 New Delhi	Women's freestyle 59 kg
African Wrestling Championships
Silver medal – second place	2010 Cairo	Women's freestyle 63 kg

Tega Tosin Richard (born 13 November 1992) is a Nigerian female wrestler. She competed at the 2010 Commonwealth Games and clinched bronze medal in the women's 59kg freestyle event. She also won a silver medal in the women's 63kg freestyle event at the 2010 African Wrestling Championships.
