= Wrestling at the 2006 Asian Games – Women's freestyle 55 kg =

Women's freestyle 55 kg at the 2006 Asian Games
- Venue: Aspire Hall 4
- Date: 11 December 2006
- Competitors: 12 from 12 nations

Medalists
gold medal	Saori Yoshida	Japan
silver medal	Olga Smirnova	Kazakhstan
bronze medal	Alka Tomar	India
bronze medal	Naidangiin Otgonjargal	Mongolia

The women's freestyle 55 kilograms wrestling competition at the 2006 Asian Games in Doha was held on 11 December 2006 at the Aspire Hall 4.

This freestyle wrestling competition consisted of a single-elimination tournament, with a repechage used to determine the winner of two bronze medals. The two finalists faced off for gold and silver medals. Each wrestler who lost to one of the two finalists moved into the repechage, culminating in a pair of bronze medal matches featuring the semifinal losers each facing the remaining repechage opponent from their half of the bracket.

Each bout consisted of up to three rounds, lasting two minutes apiece. The wrestler who scored more points in each round was the winner of that rounds; the bout finished when one wrestler had won two rounds (and thus the match).

== Schedule ==
All times are Arabia Standard Time (UTC+03:00)

Date	Time	Event
Monday, 11 December 2006	09:00	Preliminary
Monday, 11 December 2006	09:00	Quarterfinals
Monday, 11 December 2006	09:00	Semifinals
Monday, 11 December 2006	09:00	Repechages
Monday, 11 December 2006	18:00	Finals

== Results ==
Legend

- F — Won by fall

=== Main bracket ===
Preliminary
Su Ying-tzu (TPE)	3	4
Cristina Villanueva (PHI)	0	0
Kim Un-a (PRK)	1	0
Olga Smirnova (KAZ)	2	7
Try Sothavy (CAM)	1	1	0
Gulina Kubatbek Kyzy (KGZ)	1	0	6
Lee Yeon-mi (KOR)	0	0
Naidangiin Otgonjargal (MGL)	1	4

Quarterfinals
Saori Yoshida (JPN)	1	5
Alka Tomar (IND)	0	0
Su Lihui (CHN)	1	6
Nghiêm Thị Giang (VIE)	0	0
Su Ying-tzu (TPE)	0	1
Olga Smirnova (KAZ)	2	1
Gulina Kubatbek Kyzy (KGZ)	0
Naidangiin Otgonjargal (MGL)	4^{F}

Semifinals
Saori Yoshida (JPN)	6	2
Su Lihui (CHN)	1	0
Olga Smirnova (KAZ)	1	1
Naidangiin Otgonjargal (MGL)	0	0

Gold medal match
Saori Yoshida (JPN)	3	6
Olga Smirnova (KAZ)	0	0

=== Repechage ===
Repechage
Kim Un-a (PRK)	0	0
Su Ying-tzu (TPE)	1	1

Bronze medal match
Alka Tomar (IND)	2	2	1
Su Lihui (CHN)	1	3	1
Su Ying-tzu (TPE)	0	0
Naidangiin Otgonjargal (MGL)	2	2

== Final standing ==
Rank	Athlete
1st place, gold medalist(s)	Saori Yoshida (JPN)
2nd place, silver medalist(s)	Olga Smirnova (KAZ)
3rd place, bronze medalist(s)	Alka Tomar (IND)
3rd place, bronze medalist(s)	Naidangiin Otgonjargal (MGL)
5	Su Lihui (CHN)
5	Su Ying-tzu (TPE)
7	Gulina Kubatbek Kyzy (KGZ)
8	Try Sothavy (CAM)
9	Kim Un-a (PRK)
10	Lee Yeon-mi (KOR)
11	Nghiêm Thị Giang (VIE)
11	Cristina Villanueva (PHI)
