= Alena Filipava =

Belarusian wrestler (born 1987)

Personal information
- Full name: Alena Piatrouna Filipava
- Nationality: Belarus
- Born: 10 October 1987 (age 38) Minsk, BSSR, USSR (now Belarus)
- Height: 1.58 m (5 ft 2 in)
- Weight: 55 kg (121 lb)

Sport
- Sport: Wrestling
- Event: Freestyle
- Club: SK VS Minsk
- Coached by: Aleh Yakaulevich Raikhlin
Medal record
Women's freestyle wrestling
Representing Belarus
World Championships
| Bronze medal – third place | 2009 Herning | 55 kg |
European Championships
| Silver medal – second place | 2009 Vilnius | 55 kg |

Alena Piatrouna Filipava (Belarusian: Алена Пятроўна Філіпава; born October 10, 1987, in Minsk) is an amateur Belarusian freestyle wrestler, who played for the women's featherweight category. She won the bronze medal at the 2009 World Wrestling Championships in Herning, Denmark, against Tatiana Padilla of the United States, in addition to her silver at the European Championships in Vilnius, Lithuania.

Filipava made her official debut at the 2008 Summer Olympics in Beijing, where she competed for the 55 kg class in freestyle wrestling, an event which was imminently dominated by world champion Saori Yoshida from Japan. She lost the second preliminary match to Kazakhstan's Olga Smirnova, with a two-set technical score (3–2, 0–3, 2–4), and a classification score of 1–3, finishing only in thirteenth place.
