= Iryna Husyak =

Ukrainian freestyle wrestler

Personal information
- Native name: Гусяк Ірина Степанівна
- Born: 30 April 1990 (age 36) Truskavets, Lviv Oblast
- Height: 160 cm (5 ft 3 in)

Sport
- Club: "Spartak", Lviv
Medal record
Women's wrestling
Representing Ukraine
European Championships
Gold medal – first place	2019 Bucharest	55 kg
Bronze medal – third place	2013 Tbilisi	55 kg
Summer Universiade
Silver medal – second place	2013 Kazan	55 kg

Iryna Husyak (Ukrainian: Ірина Степанівна Гусяк; born 30 April 1990 in Truskavets, Lviv Oblast, Ukraine) is a Ukrainian freestyle wrestler. She is a member of Spartak Lviv sports club. She is 2019 European champion.
