= Aiym Abdildina =

Kazakhstani freestyle wrestler

Personal information
- Born: 23 December 1989 (age 36)

Sport
- Country: Kazakhstan
- Sport: Amateur wrestling
- Event: Freestyle
Medal record
Women's freestyle wrestling
Representing Kazakhstan
World Wrestling Championships
Bronze medal – third place	2016 Budapest	55 kg
Asian Games
Bronze medal – third place	2010 Guangzhou	53 kg
Asian Wrestling Championships
Silver medal – second place	2016 Bangkok	58 kg
Bronze medal – third place	2009 Pattaya	55 kg
Bronze medal – third place	2011 Tashkent	55 kg
Bronze medal – third place	2012 Gumi	59 kg
Bronze medal – third place	2014 Astana	55 kg
Bronze medal – third place	2015 Doha	58 kg

Aiym Abdildina (born 23 December 1989) is a Kazakhstani freestyle wrestler. She won one of the bronze medals in the women's 55 kg event at the 2010 Asian Games held in Guangzhou, China. She also competed at the Asian Wrestling Championships and between 2009 and 2016 she won a total of one silver medal and five bronze medals at that event.
