= Olga Smirnova (wrestler) =

Kazakhstani wrestler

Personal information
- Full name: Olga Vladimirovna Smirnova
- Nationality: Russia; Kazakhstan
- Born: 11 May 1979 (age 47) Novocheboksarsk, Soviet Union
- Height: 1.64 m (5 ft 4 1/2 in)
- Weight: 55 kg (121 lb)

Sport
- Sport: Wrestling
- Event: Freestyle
- Club: Yunost Rossii Almetyevsk
- Coached by: Nikolai Petrovich Belov
Medal record
Women's freestyle wrestling
Asian Games
Representing Kazakhstan
Silver medal – second place	2006 Doha	55 kg
World Championships
Representing Russia
Gold medal – first place	1996 Sofia	50 kg
Representing Kazakhstan
Bronze medal – third place	2007 Baku	55 kg
European Championships
Representing Russia
Gold medal – first place	2000 Budapest	51 kg
Gold medal – first place	2002 Seinäjoki	51 kg
Bronze medal – third place	1996 Oslo	53 kg
Asian Championships
Representing Kazakhstan
Silver medal – second place	2008 Jeju City	59 kg
Bronze medal – third place	2007 Bishkek	55 kg

Olga Vladimirovna Smirnova (Russian: Ольга Владимировна Смирнова; born May 11, 1979, in Novocheboksarsk, Soviet Union) is an amateur Russian-born Kazakhstani freestyle wrestler, who played for the women's lightweight category. She is a two-time Olympian, a three-time medalist at the European Senior Championships, and a gold medalist for the 50 kg class at the 1996 World Wrestling Championships in Sofia, Bulgaria. Smirnova also added a silver medal from the 2006 Asian Games in Doha, Qatar, and bronze from the 2007 World Wrestling Championships in Baku, Azerbaijan, representing her adopted nation Kazakhstan.

== Wrestling career ==
Smirnova emerged as one of Russia's most prominent female wrestlers in its sporting history. She is a member of Yunost Rossii Wrestling Club in Almetyevsk, and is coached and trained by Nikolai Petrovich Belov, since she started competing in 1995.

In 1996, Smirnova had won her first ever career wrestling title for the 50 kg division at the World Championships in Sofia, Bulgaria, and also, added the bronze medal to her collection from the European Championships in Oslo, Norway. She continued to build success by capturing a total of three gold medals for the 54 kg class at the World and European Junior Championships. In the early 2000s Smirnova returned to the senior division, and eventually dominated the 51 kg class twice at the European Championships, defeating Sweden's Ida Hellström.

Smirnova became one of the first female wrestlers to mark their official debut at the 2004 Summer Olympics in Athens. She placed third in the preliminary pool of the women's 55 kg class, after losing out by a grand superiority (3–13) to Canada's Tonya Verbeek, and consequently, by a fall (2–5) to U.S. wrestler Tela O'Connell.

Shortly after the Olympics, Smirnova moved to Kazakhstan, where she obtained a dual citizenship in order to compete internationally for wrestling. She eventually won the silver medal in the women's 55 kg class at the 2006 Asian Games in Doha, Qatar, losing out to Japanese wrestler and world champion Saori Yoshida. Following her further success from the Asian Games, Smirnova captured two more medals from the Asian Championships, and also, won a bronze for the 59 kg division at the 2007 World Wrestling Championships in Baku, Azerbaijan, which guaranteed her a spot for the Olympics.

At the 2008 Summer Olympics in Beijing, Smirnova competed for the second time, as a member of the Kazakhstan wrestling team, in the women's 55 kg class. She defeated Belarus' Alena Filipava in the preliminary round, before losing out the quarterfinal match to China's Xu Li, with a three-set technical score (0–1, 2–0, 2–1) and classification point score of 1–3. Because her opponent advanced further into the final, Smirnova offered another shot for the bronze medal by entering the repechage bouts. Unfortunately, she was defeated in the first round by Romania's Ana Maria Pavăl, with a technical score of 4–9.
