= Brittanee Laverdure =

Canadian freestyle wrestler

Personal information
- Full name: Brittanee Morgana Laverdure
- Born: 1 March 1982 (age 44) Williams Lake, British Columbia, Canada
- Height: 1.61 m (5 ft 3 in)
- Weight: 58 kg (128 lb)

Sport
- Sport: Wrestling
Medal record
Women's freestyle wrestling
Representing Canada
Commonwealth Games
| Silver medal – second place | 2014 Glasgow | 55 kg freestyle |
World Championships
| Bronze medal – third place | 2008 Tokyo | 55 kg freestyle |
- Updated on 2 August 2014

Brittanee Laverdure (born 1 March 1982) is a wrestler competing for Canada. She won a silver medal in the 55 kg freestyle at the 2014 Commonwealth Games in Glasgow., 2012 World 5th Place, 2010 World University Champion, 2008 World Bronze Medalist, 2007 World 5th Place. She was the regional winner of the Tom Longboat Award for the Yukon in 2005.

2006 University of Calgary Female Athlete of the Year Brittanee spent her varsity career as a member of the University of Calgary Dinos she was a Canada West Champion in 2001, 2002, 2005, 2006 and University National Champion in 2001, 2002, 2005, 2006
