= Valeria Koblova =

Russian freestyle wrestler

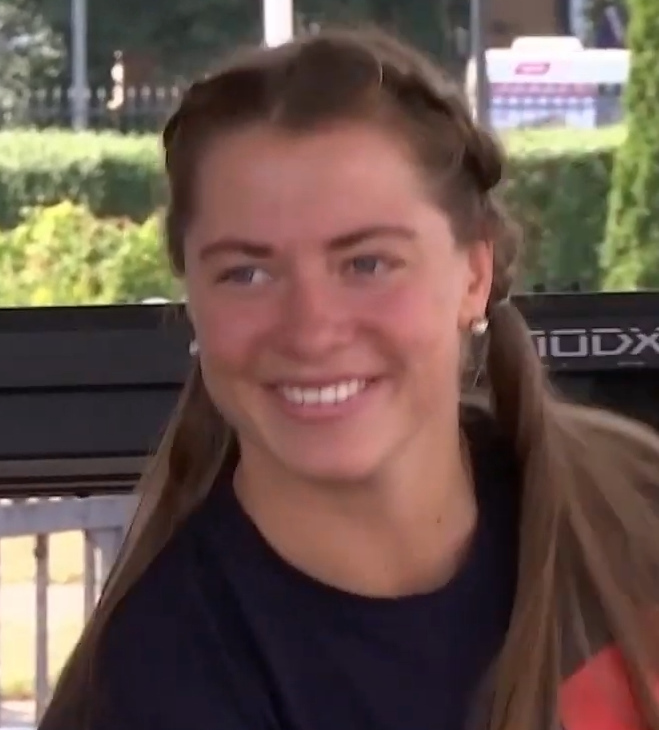
- Koblova in August 2021

Personal information
- Native name: Валерия Сергеевна Коблова (Жолобова)
- Full name: Valeria Sergeyevna Koblova (Zholobova)
- Nationality: (Russia) Russian
- Born: October 9, 1992 (age 33) Yegoryevsk, Moscow Oblast, Russia
- Weight: 58 kg (128 lb)

Sport
- Country: Russia
- Sport: Wrestling
- Event: Freestyle wrestling
- Club: Yegoryevsk female wrestling team
- Coached by: Oleg Chernov
Medal record
Women's Freestyle Wrestling
Representing Russia
Summer Olympics
Silver medal – second place	2016 Rio de Janeiro	58 kg
World Championships
Silver medal – second place	2014 Tashkent	58 kg
Wrestling World Cup
Silver medal – second place	2015 Saint Petersburg	58 kg
European Championships U23
Gold medal – first place	2015 Wałbrzych	58 kg

Valeria Sergeyevna Koblova, née Zholobova (Russian: Валерия Сергеевна Коблова; born 9 October 1992) is a Russian retired freestyle wrestler. She competed in the freestyle 55 kg event at the 2012 Summer Olympics; she advanced to the bronze medal match, where she was defeated by Yuliya Ratkevich. At the 2014 World Wrestling Championships she lost in the final match to 10-time World champion and 4-time Olympic champion Kaori Icho. At the 2016 Summer Olympics she lost in the gold medal match to Kaori Icho. She is Grand Master of Sports in freestyle wrestling.
