= Marwa Amri =

Tunisian freestyle wrestler

Personal information
- Full name: Marwa Al-Amri
- Nationality: Tunisian
- Born: 8 January 1989 (age 37) Tunis, Tunisia
Medal record
Women's freestyle wrestling
Representing Tunisia
Summer Olympics
Bronze medal – third place	2016 Rio de Janeiro	58 kg
World Championships
Silver medal – second place	2017 Paris	58 kg
African Championships
Gold medal – first place	2009 Casablanca	55 kg
Gold medal – first place	2010 Cairo	55 kg
Gold medal – first place	2011 Dakar	55 kg
Gold medal – first place	2012 Marrakesh	55 kg
Gold medal – first place	2013 N'Djamena	55 kg
Gold medal – first place	2014 Tunis	55 kg
Gold medal – first place	2015 Alexandria	58 kg
Gold medal – first place	2016 Alexandria	58 kg
Gold medal – first place	2017 Marrakesh	60 kg
Gold medal – first place	2019 Hammamet	62 kg
Gold medal – first place	2020 Algiers	62 kg
Gold medal – first place	2022 El Jadida	62 kg
Gold medal – first place	2023 Hammamet	62 kg
Silver medal – second place	2007 Cairo	59 kg
Silver medal – second place	2008 Tunis	55 kg
African Games
Bronze medal – third place	2015 Brazzaville	58 kg
Mediterranean Games
Gold medal – first place	2022 Oran	62 kg
Silver medal – second place	2009 Pescara	55 kg
Silver medal – second place	2013 Mersin	55 kg
Silver medal – second place	2018 Tarragona	62 kg
Arab Championships
Gold medal – first place	2010 Doha	55 kg
Yasar Dogu Tournament
Bronze medal – third place	2022 Istanbul	62 kg
Dan Kolov - Nikola Petrov Tournament
Silver medal – second place	2023 Sofia	62 kg
Bronze medal – third place	2011 Burgas	55 kg
Bronze medal – third place	2018 Sofia	59 kg
Grand Prix
Gold medal – first place	2014 Klippan	55 kg
Gold medal – first place	2014 Madrid	55 kg
Gold medal – first place	2015 Warsaw	55 kg
Gold medal – first place	2017 Paris	63 kg
Gold medal – first place	2017 Dormagen	60 kg
Gold medal – first place	2017 Madrid	58 kg
Gold medal – first place	2019 Warsaw	62 kg
Gold medal – first place	2021 Sassari	62 kg
Silver medal – second place	2012 Goetzis	55 kg
Silver medal – second place	2016 Madrid	58 kg
Silver medal – second place	2018 Warsaw	58 kg
Bronze medal – third place	2011 Kyiv	55 kg
Bronze medal – third place	2012 Madrid	55 kg
Bronze medal – third place	2014 Sassari	55 kg
Bronze medal – third place	2014 Dabrowa	55 kg
Bronze medal – third place	2022 Bucharest	62 kg

Marwa Al-Amri (Arabic: مروى العامري, born 8 January 1989) is a Tunisian freestyle wrestler. She was born in Tunis. She represented Tunisia in the women's lightweight freestyle competition at the 2008, 2012, 2016 and 2020 Summer Olympics. She is the first woman from Africa win an Olympic medal in wrestling.

== Career ==
At the 2008 Olympics in the 55 kg category, she lost in the first round to Jackeline Rentería.

At the 2012 Olympics in the 55 kg category, she defeated Um Ji-Eun in the qualifications and was eliminated by Sofia Mattsson in the 1/8 finals.

She improved yet again at the 2016 Olympics, in the 58 kg category. Although she lost to Kaori Icho in the first round, she was entered into the repechage because Icho reached the final. In the repechage she beat Elif Jale Yeşilırmak, and then Yuliya Ratkevich in her bronze medal match.

In 2020, she won the gold medal in the women's freestyle 62 kg event at the African Wrestling Championships. She qualified at the 2021 African & Oceania Wrestling Olympic Qualification Tournament to represent Tunisia at the 2020 Summer Olympics in Tokyo, Japan. She competed in the women's freestyle 62 kg event.

She won the gold medal in her event at the 2022 African Wrestling Championships held in El Jadida, Morocco. A few months later, she also won the gold medal in the 62 kg event at the 2022 Mediterranean Games held in Oran, Algeria. She competed in the 62 kg event at the 2022 World Wrestling Championships held in Belgrade, Serbia.

She won the silver medal in the women's 62 kg event at the 2023 Dan Kolov & Nikola Petrov Tournament held in Sofia, Bulgaria.

== Early life and education ==
Amri is the oldest of four children. Her father died when she was nine. She took up wrestling when she was 11. Despite a lack of funding, facilities and female training partners, Amri persevered, attending World and African championships through government funding. She has a degree in physical education.

== See also ==
- Muslim women in sport
