= Marcia Andrades =

Venezuelan freestyle wrestler

Personal information
- Full name: Marcia Yuleisi Andrades Mendoza
- Born: 17 May 1984 (age 42) Cumaná, Venezuela
Medal record
Women's freestyle wrestling
Representing Venezuela
Pan American Games
| Bronze medal – third place | 2003 Santo Domingo | 55 kg |

Marcia Yuleisi Andrades Mendoza (born 17 May 1984 in Cumaná) is a Venezuelan freestyle wrestler. She competed in the freestyle 55 kg event at the 2012 Summer Olympics and was eliminated by Valeria Zholobova in the qualifications. At the 2008 Olympics, she lost to Ludmila Cristea at the same stage. Andrades was born in Cumaná, Venezuela.
