= Yuliya Ratkevich =

Belarusian-born Azerbaijani wrestler

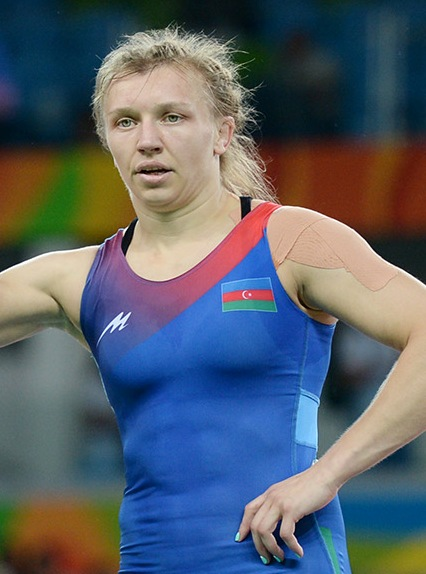
- Ratkevich at the 2016 Olympics

Personal information
- Native name: Юлія Мікалаеўна Раткевіч
- Born: 16 July 1985 (age 41) Minsk, Belarus
Medal record
Women's freestyle wrestling
Representing Azerbaijan
Olympic Games
Bronze medal – third place	2012 London	55 kg
World Championships
Gold medal – first place	2009 Herning	59 kg
Silver medal – second place	2010 Moscow	55 kg
Bronze medal – third place	2013 Budapest	59 kg
Silver medal – second place	2014 Tashkent	60 kg
Bronze medal – third place	2015 Las Vegas	58 kg
European Championship
Gold medal – first place	2011 Dortmund	59 kg
Bronze medal – third place	2016 Riga	60 kg
Summer Universiade
Gold medal – first place	Kazan 2013	59 kg
Representing Belarus
European Championships
Bronze medal – third place	2005 Varna	59 kg

Yuliya Ratkevich (Belarusian: Юлія Мікалаеўна Раткевіч; Łacinka: Julija Mikałajeŭna Ratkievič; born 16 July 1985) is a Belarusian-born Azerbaijani female wrestler. She is the 2012 Olympic bronze medalist in women's freestyle 55 kg. Early in her career, she competed for Belarus.

== Career ==
Representing Belarus, Ratkevich won bronze in the 59 kg category at the 2005 European Championships in Varna. After switching to Azerbaijan, she won gold at the 2009 World Championships in Herning and at the 2011 European Championships in Dortmund.

Ratkevich competed in women's freestyle 55 kg at the 2012 Summer Olympics in London. She beat Maria Prevolaraki of Greece in the round of 16, but lost to Saori Yoshida in the next round. Ratkevich thus qualified for the repechage round where she beat American wrestler Kelsey Campbell. In the bronze medal final, she beat Valeria Zholobova from Russia.

Ratkevich also competed in women's freestyle 58 kg at the 2016 Summer Olympics in Rio de Janeiro, Brazil. She lost to Tunisia's Marwa Amri in the bronze medal round.
