= Lissette Antes =

Ecuadorian freestyle wrestler (born 1991)

Personal information
- Born: 2 May 1991 (age 35) La Libertad, Ecuador

Sport
- Sport: Freestyle wrestling
Medal record
Women's freestyle wrestling
Representing Ecuador
Pan American Games
Gold medal – first place	2019 Lima	57 kg
Bronze medal – third place	2011 Guadalajara	55 kg
Bronze medal – third place	2015 Toronto	58 kg
South American Games
Gold medal – first place	2014 Santiago	53 kg

Lissette Alexandra Antes Castillo (born 2 May 1991) is an Ecuadorian freestyle wrestler. She competed in the freestyle 55 kg event at the 2012 Summer Olympics; she defeated Olga Butkevych, who was representing the United Kingdom, in the 1/8 finals and was eliminated by Colombia Jackeline Rentería in the quarterfinals. She competed in the women's lightweight event at the 2016 Summer Olympics, but was defeated by Moldova's Mariana Cherdivara in the first round.
