= Naidangiin Otgonjargal =

Mongolian freestyle wrestler (born 1979)

Personal information
- Nationality: Mongolia
- Born: 14 November 1979 (age 46) Bulgan sum, Arkhangai aimag, Mongolia
- Height: 1.60 m (5 ft 3 in)
- Weight: 55 kg (121 lb)

Sport
- Sport: Wrestling
- Event: Freestyle
- Club: Hangai Wrestling Club
- Coached by: Oyunbold Dugarsuren
Medal record
Women's freestyle wrestling
Representing Mongolia
Asian Games
Bronze medal – third place	2002 Busan	55 kg
Bronze medal – third place	2006 Doha	55 kg
Asian Championships
Gold medal – first place	2003 New Delhi	55 kg
Bronze medal – third place	2001 Ulaanbaatar	51 kg
Bronze medal – third place	2004 Tokyo	55 kg

Naidangiin Otgonjargal (Mongolian: Найдангийн Отгонжаргал; born November 14, 1979, in Bulgan sum, Arkhangai aimag) is an amateur Mongolian freestyle wrestler, who played for the women's lightweight category. Between 2001 and 2004, Otgonjargal had won a total of three medals (one gold and two bronze) for the 51 and 55 kg classes at the Asian Wrestling Championships. She also captured two bronze medals in the same division at the 2002 Asian Games in Busan, South Korea, and at the 2006 Asian Games in Doha, Qatar.

Otgonjargal represented Mongolia at the 2008 Summer Olympics in Beijing, where she competed for the women's 55 kg class. She lost the first preliminary round match to Canadian wrestler and Olympic silver medalist Tonya Verbeek, who was able to score seven points in two straight periods, leaving Otgonjargal without a single point.
