= Alka Tomar =

Indian wrestler

Personal information
- Nationality: Indian
- Born: Sisoli village, Meerut district, Uttar Pradesh

Sport
- Country: India
- Sport: Wrestling
- Event: Freestyle wrestling
Medal record
Representing India
Women's Freestyle Wrestling
World Wrestling Championships
Bronze medal – third place	2006 Guangzhou	59 kg
Commonwealth Games
Gold medal – first place	2010 Delhi	59 kg
Asian Games
Bronze medal – third place	2006 Doha	55 Kg
Asian Wrestling Championships
Bronze medal – third place	2003 New Delhi	59 kg
Silver medal – second place	2005 Wuhan	59 kg
Bronze medal – third place	2009 Pattaya	59 kg
Bronze medal – third place	2010 New Delhi	59 kg
Commonwealth Wrestling Championship
Silver medal – second place	2003 London	55 kg
Gold medal – first place	2005 Cape Town	59 kg
Gold medal – first place	2009 Jalander	59 kg
Gold medal – first place	2011 Melbourne	59 kg

Alka Tomar is an Indian wrestler who belongs to village Sisauli (Uttar Pradesh). She became the National Women Wrestling champion of India, and received the bronze medal in Wrestling (59 kg Freestyle) at the Doha Asian Games in 2006. Alka Tomar also received a bronze at the Senior Wrestling Championships in Guangzhou in China 2006.

She also won a Gold Medal at the Commonwealth Games 2010 in Delhi where she competed against Tonya Verbeek of Canada.

== Early life ==
Alka was born to Nain Singh Tomar and Munni Devi in village Sisauli (Uttar Pradesh).
