= Anna Zwirydowska =

Polish wrestler (born 1986)

Medal record

Women's freestyle wrestling

Representing Poland

World Championships
Disqualified	2008 Tokyo	55 kg

European Championships
Silver medal – second place	2014 Vantaa	55 kg

Anna Zwirydowska (born January 28, 1986) is a Polish freestyle wrestler. She won a bronze medal at the 2008 FILA Wrestling World Championships in the category -55 kg. She committed an anti-doping rule violation during in-competition doping control at the 2008 Women's World Championships in Tokyo, Japan. As a result, Zwirydowska was disqualified and removed from the classification standings.
