= Ana Maria Pavăl =

Romanian freestyle wrestler

Personal information
- Nationality: Romania
- Born: 10 July 1983 (age 43) Oneşti, Romania
- Height: 1.59 m (5 ft 2 1/2 in)
- Weight: 53 kg (117 lb)

Sport
- Sport: Wrestling
- Event: Freestyle
- Club: CSA Steaua Bucuresti
- Coached by: Simon Constantin
Medal record
Women's freestyle wrestling
Representing Romania
European Championships
Bronze medal – third place	2005 Varna	55 kg
Bronze medal – third place	2009 Vilnius	55 kg
Bronze medal – third place	2010 Baku	55 kg
Bronze medal – third place	2012 Belgrade	55 kg
Bronze medal – third place	2014 Vantaa	53 kg

Ana Maria Pavăl (born July 10, 1983) is a Romanian freestyle wrestler, who is playing for the women's 53 kilograms category. Since 2005, Pavăl had won a total of five bronze medals at the European Wrestling Championships. She is a member of CSA Steaua București, and is coached and trained by Simon Constantin and Vasile Vişan.

Paval represented Romania at the 2008 Summer Olympics in Beijing, where she competed for the women's 55 kg class. She lost the first preliminary match to China's Xu Li. Because her opponent advanced further into the final match, Pavăl offered another shot for the bronze medal by defeating Kazakhstan's Olga Smirnova in the repechage bout. She progressed to the bronze medal match, but narrowly lost by a fall to Colombia's Jackeline Rentería, finishing only in fifth place.
