= Tonya Verbeek =

Canadian freestyle wrestler, University of Iowa Women's Wrestling Assistant Coach

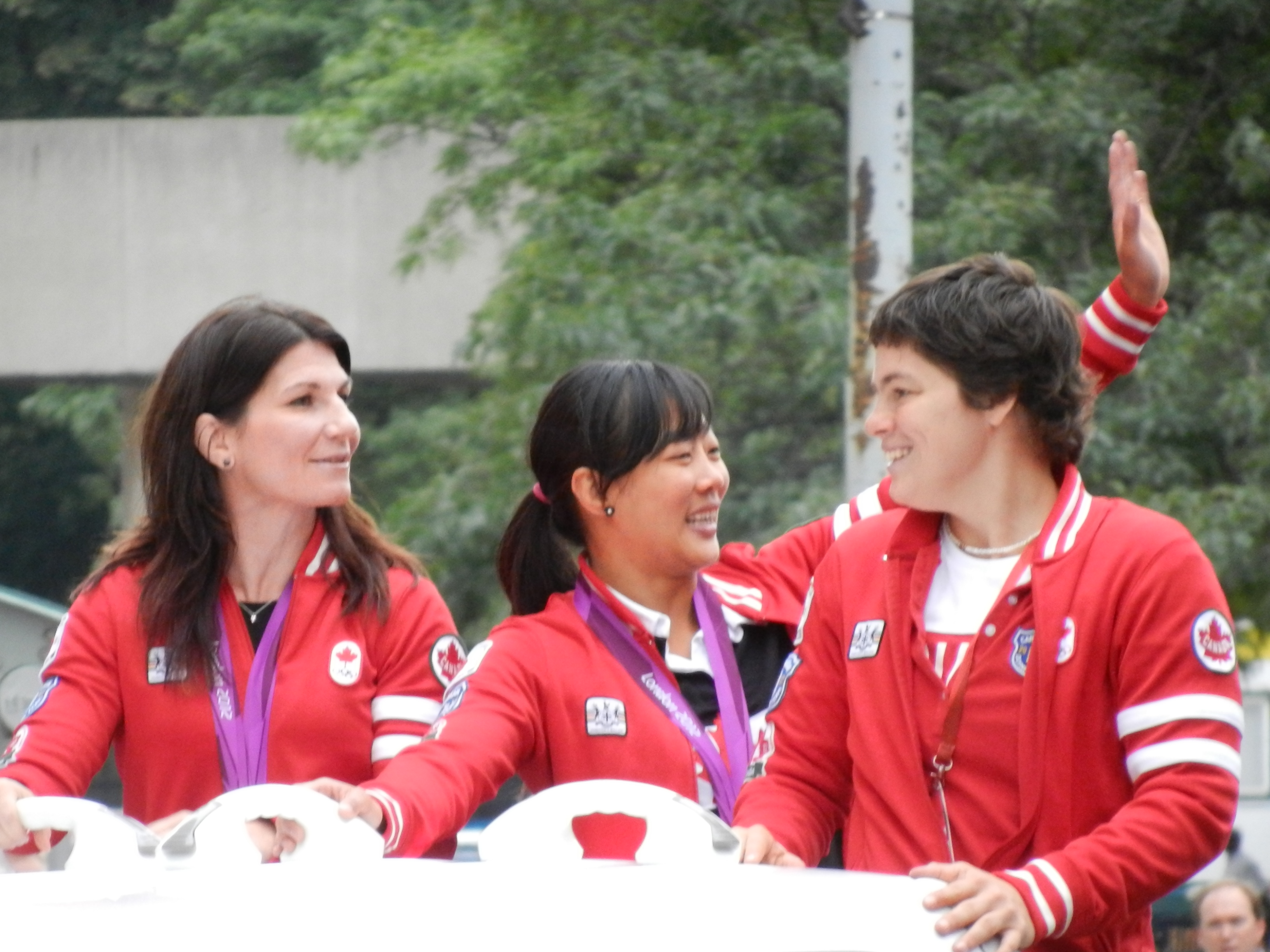
- Verbeek (far left) in 2012

Personal information
- Full name: Tonya Lynn Verbeek
- Born: 14 August 1977 (age 49) Grimsby, Ontario, Canada
- Height: 1.65 m (5 ft 5 in)
- Weight: 55 kg (121 lb)

Sport
- Sport: Wrestling
- Event: Freestyle
- Club: Brock Wrestling Club
Medal record
Women's freestyle wrestling
Representing Canada
Olympic Games
Silver medal – second place	2004 Athens	55 kg
Silver medal – second place	2012 London	55 kg
Bronze medal – third place	2008 Beijing	55 kg
World Championships
Silver medal – second place	2011 Istanbul	55 kg
Bronze medal – third place	2005 Budapest	55 kg
Bronze medal – third place	2009 Herning	55 kg
Commonwealth Games
Silver medal – second place	2010 Delhi	59 kg
Pan American Games
Silver medal – second place	2003 Santo Domingo	55 kg
Silver medal – second place	2011 Guadalajara	55 kg
Bronze medal – third place	2007 Rio De Janeiro	55 kg

Tonya Lynn Verbeek (born 14 August 1977) is a Canadian freestyle wrestler. Verbeek was the first woman to win a wrestling medal for Canada when she took silver in 2004, she added to that with a bronze at the 2008 Summer Olympics and a second silver at the 2012 Summer Olympics in London. She has also won two bronze and a silver at the world championships and has a bronze and silver from the Pan American Games and Commonwealth Games respectively.

== Sports career ==
She was born in Grimsby, Ontario. She took up wrestling in grade eleven and was undefeated throughout high school in Beamsville, Ontario. She trains at Brock University in St. Catharines, Ontario, and is coached by Marty Calder.

She won a silver medal at the 2004 Summer Olympics in freestyle women's wrestling in the 55 kg category.

At the 2008 Summer Olympics, she won Canada's third medal overall, the third Canadian medal ever in women's wrestling, by winning a bronze. Verbeek won a silver medal at the 2011 world championships. She was undefeated in 2012 when she was named to the Canadian team for the 2012 Summer Olympics. On 9 August 2012, Verbeek defeated Geeta Phogat of India in her first round match. Verbeek went on to win the silver medal in the Women's 55 kg freestyle category, being defeated by Saori Yoshida in the final.

== Wrestling record ==
=== International results ===
- 2012 Olympic Games 2nd
- 2008 Olympic Games 3
- 2007 Olympic Trial 1
- 2005 Senior World Championships 3
- 2004 Olympic Games 2
- 2004 Canada Cup 1
- 2004 Austrian Ladies Open 1
- 2004 Women's Olympic Qualifying Tournament – 1 6
- 2004 Athens Pre-Olympic Test Event 3
- 2003 NYAC Tournament 1
- 2003 World Cup of Women's Wrestling 2
- 2003 Pan American Games 2
- 2003 Canada Cup 2
- 2003 Gotzis Lady Open 2
- 2003 Hans von Zons 1
- 2003 Pan American Championships 1
- 2003 Klippan 4
- 2002 World Cup of Women's Wrestling 4
- 2002 Poland Open 4
- 2002 World University Championships 3
- 2001 Gilbert Schuab (56 kg) 1
- 2000 Canada Cup (56 kg) 4
- 1995 Sunkist 4
- 1995 Senior World Championships 5

=== Canadian National Championships ===
- 2005 Senior National Championships 1
- 2003 Senior National Championships 2
- 2002 Senior National Championships 2
- 2001 Senior National Championship (56 kg) 3
- 2000 Senior National Championship (56 kg) 3
- 1999 Senior National Championships (56 kg) 4
- 1997 Junior National Championships (56 kg) 2
- 1996 Senior National Championships 2
- 1995 Senior National Championship 1
- 1995 Espoir National Championships 1
- 1994 Senior National Championship 2

== See also ==
- Wrestling in Canada
