= Um Ji-eun =

South Korean freestyle wrestler

Personal information
- Born: 18 May 1987 (age 39) Incheon, South Korea

Korean name
- Hangul: 엄지은
- RR: Eom Jieun
- MR: Ŏm Chiŭn

Sport
- Sport: Freestyle wrestling

Um Ji-Eun (Korean: 엄지은; born 18 May 1987) is a South Korean freestyle wrestler. She competed in the freestyle 55 kg event at the 2012 Summer Olympics and was eliminated in the qualifications by Marwa Amri. Um was born in Incheon, South Korea.
