= Ida-Theres Karlsson-Nerell =

Swedish freestyle wrestler (born 1983)

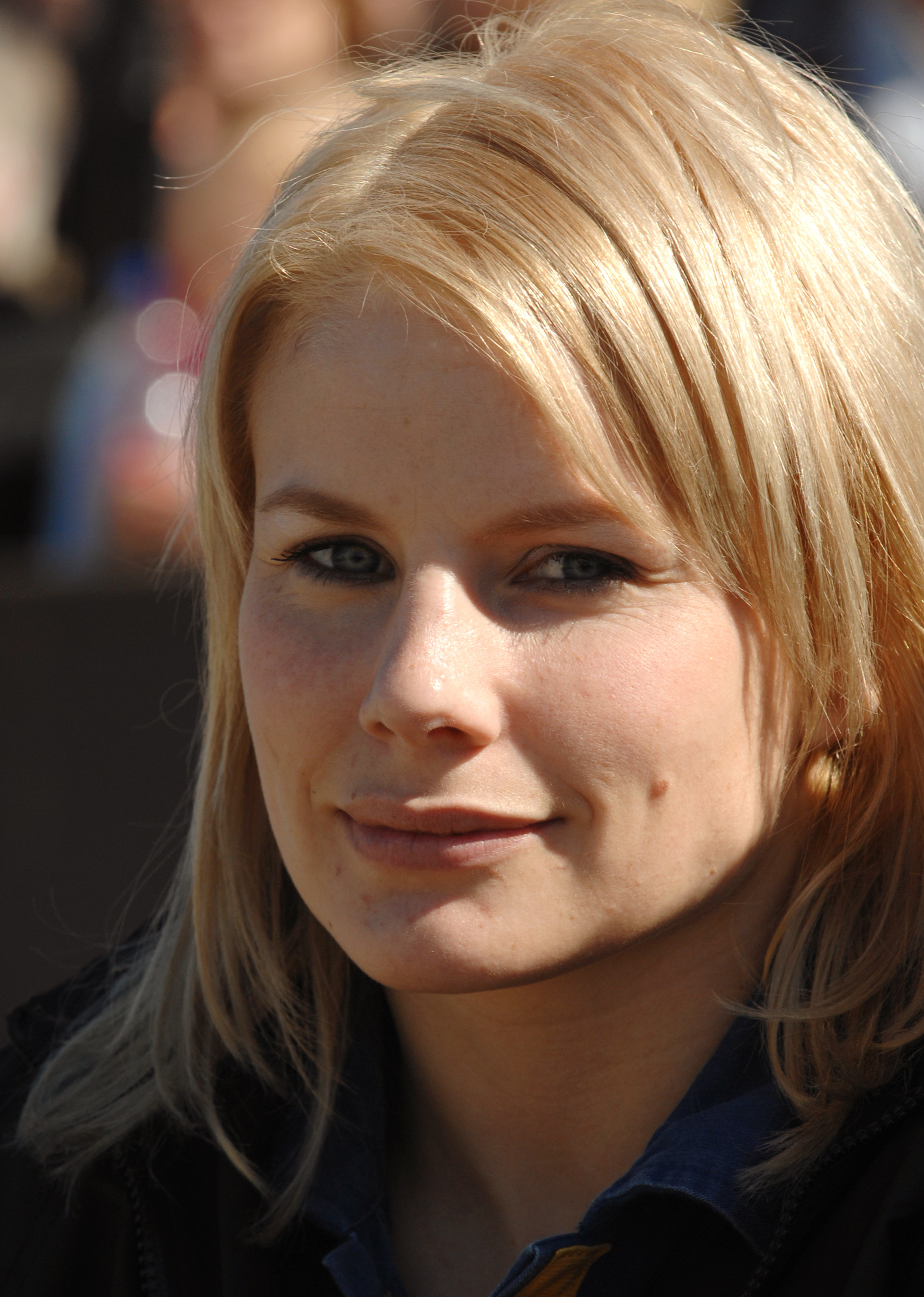

Medal record

Women's freestyle wrestling

Representing Sweden

World Championships
Silver medal – second place	2007 Baku	55 kg
Bronze medal – third place	2002 Chalcis	55 kg
Bronze medal – third place	2006 Guangzhou	55 kg
Bronze medal – third place	2011 Istanbul	55 kg

European Championship
Gold medal – first place	2004 Haaparanta	55 kg
Gold medal – first place	2005 Varna	59 kg
Gold medal – first place	2007 Sofia	55 kg
Gold medal – first place	2008 Tampere	59 kg
Gold medal – first place	2011 Dortmund	55 kg
Silver medal – second place	2001 Budapest	56 kg
Silver medal – second place	2002 Seinäjoki	55 kg

Ida-Theres Karlsson-Nerell (born 18 April 1983) is a retired Swedish freestyle wrestler.

She was born in Boden. At the World Championships she won a bronze medal in 2002 (55 kg), finished nineteenth in 2003 (55 kg), won a bronze medal in 2006 (55 kg) and a silver medal in 2007 (55 kg). She finished fourth at the 2004 Olympic Games, and fifth at the 2008 Olympic Games.

At the European Championships she won silver medals in 2001 (56 kg) and 2002 (55 kg), finished sixth in 2003 (55 kg) and won gold medals in 2004 (55 kg), 2005 (59 kg) and 2007 (59 kg).

After the Summer Olympics in 2008 she took a time out from wrestling to, among other things, focus on her family. In 2011, she made a comeback and won a gold medal at the 2011 European Wrestling Championships.

On 27 November 2014, she announced her retirement from wrestling.
