= Jackeline Rentería =

Colombian freestyle wrestler

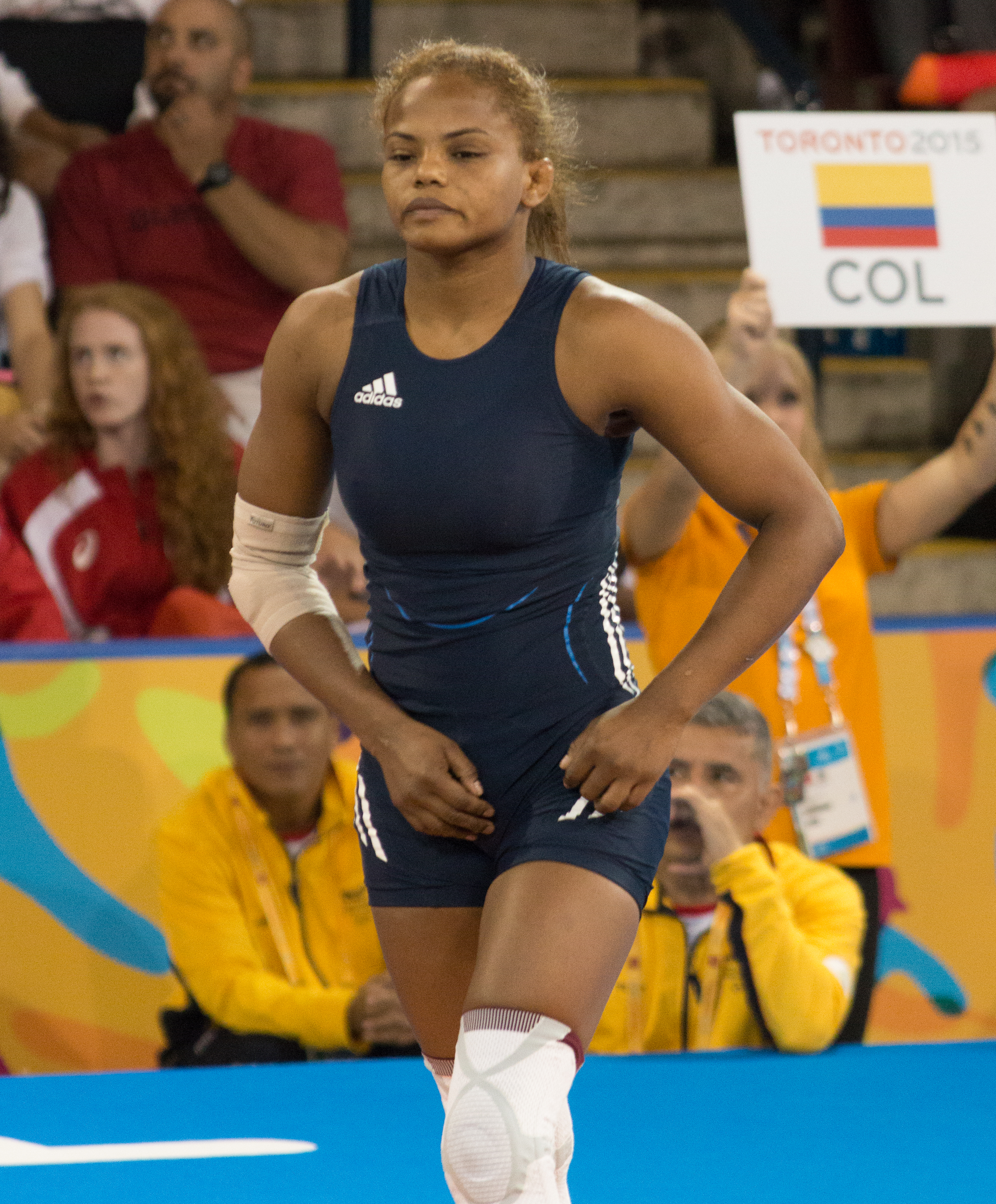
- Rentería at the 2015 Pan American Games

Personal information
- Full name: Jaqueline Rentería Castillo
- Born: 23 February 1986 (age 40) Cali, Colombia
Medal record
Representing Colombia
Women's freestyle wrestling
Olympic Games
Bronze medal – third place	2008 Beijing	55 kg
Bronze medal – third place	2012 London	55 kg
World Championships
Bronze medal – third place	2017 Paris	63 kg
Pan American Games
Gold medal – first place	2007 Rio de Janeiro	55 kg
Silver medal – second place	2019 Lima	62 kg
Bronze medal – third place	2015 Toronto	63 kg
Pan American Championships
Gold medal – first place	2005 Guatemala City	59 kg
Gold medal – first place	2007 San Salvador	55 kg
Gold medal – first place	2014 Mexico City	63 kg
Gold medal – first place	2016 Frisco	60 kg
Silver medal – second place	2006 Rio de Janeiro	59 kg
Bronze medal – third place	2013 Panama City	63 kg
Bronze medal – third place	2018 Lima	62 kg
Central American and Caribbean Games
Gold medal – first place	2010 Mayagüez	59 kg
Gold medal – first place	2014 Veracruz	63 kg
Bronze medal – third place	2018 Barranquilla	62 kg
South American Games
Gold medal – first place	2006 Buenos Aires	59 kg
Gold medal – first place	2010 Medellín	59 kg
Gold medal – first place	2014 Santiago	63 kg
Bronze medal – third place	2018 Cochabamba	62 kg
Bolivarian Games
Gold medal – first place	2013 Trujillo	63 kg
Silver medal – second place	2017 Santa Marta	63 kg
Bronze medal – third place	2005 Armenia-Pereira	59 kg
U20 World Championships
Silver medal – second place	2006 Guatemala City	59 kg

Jackeline Rentería Castillo (Note: In this Spanish name, the first or paternal surname is Rentería and the second or maternal family name is Castillo.) (born 23 February 1986 in Cali, Colombia) is a female wrestler from Colombia. She won a bronze medal in the women's freestyle 55 kg at the 2008 Summer Olympics, and repeated the feat in the women's freestyle 55 kg category at the 2012 Summer Olympics. She reached the semifinals in both tournaments, losing to the eventual silver medalists and winning the repechage bout. With her second medal she tied Helmut Bellingrodt, an Olympic Sports Shooter as the most decorated Colombian Olympian. In the Rio 2016 Olympics, they were joined by Óscar Figueroa in Weightlifting, Caterine Ibargüen in Triple Jump and Mariana Pajón in BMX. She is studying at the Pontificia Universidad Javeriana and also at the Universidad de Thomas Gomez.
