= Kyrgyzstan at the 2020 Summer Olympics =

- IOC code: KGZ
- NOC: National Olympic Committee of the Republic of Kyrgyzstan
- Website: www.olympic.kg (in Kyrgyz, Russian, and English)

in Tokyo, Japan July 23, 2021 – August 8, 2021
- Competitors: 17 in 7 sports
- Flag bearers (opening): Kanykei Kubanychbekova; Denis Petrashov
- Flag bearer (closing): Ernazar Akmataliev
- Medals Ranked 70th: Gold 0 Silver 2 Bronze 1 Total 3

Summer Olympics appearances (overview)
- 1996; 2000; 2004; 2008; 2012; 2016; 2020; 2024

Other related appearances
- Russian Empire (1900–1912); Soviet Union (1952–1988); Unified Team (1992)

Kyrgyzstan participated at the 2020 Summer Olympics held in Tokyo. Initially scheduled to take place from 24 July to 9 August 2020, the Games were postponed to 23 July to 8 August 2021, because of the COVID-19 pandemic. It was the nation's seventh consecutive appearance at the Summer Olympics in the post-Soviet era.

== Medalists ==
Medal	Name	Sport	Event	Date
Silver	Akzhol Makhmudov	Wrestling	Men's Greco-Roman 77 kg	August 3
Silver	Aisuluu Tynybekova	Wrestling	Women's freestyle 62 kg	August 4
Bronze	Meerim Zhumanazarova	Wrestling	Women's freestyle 68 kg	August 3

== Competitors ==
The following is the list of number of competitors in the Games.

Sport	Men	Women	Total
Athletics	1	2	3
Fencing	1	0	1
Judo	1	0	1
Shooting	0	1	1
Swimming	1	0	1
Weightlifting	1	0	1
Wrestling	6	3	9
Total	11	6	17

== Athletics ==
Kyrgyz athletes achieved the entry standards, either by qualifying time or by world ranking, in the following track and field events (with a maximum of three athletes in each event):

Key

- Note–Ranks given for track events are within the athlete's heat only
- Q = Qualified for the next round
- q = Qualified for the next round as a fastest loser or, in field events, by position without achieving the qualifying target
- NR = National record
- N/A = Round not applicable for the event
- Bye = Athlete not required to compete in round

Track & road events

Athlete	Event	Heat		Final	
Athlete	Event	Result	Rank	Result	Rank
Nursultan Keneshbekov	Men's 5000 m	14:07.79	18	Did not advance	
Darya Maslova	Women's marathon	—		2:35:35	36

== Fencing ==
Kyrgyzstan entered one fencer into the Olympic competition for the first time since 2008. Roman Petrov claimed a spot in the men's épée by winning the final match at the Asia and Oceania Zonal Qualifier in Tashkent, Uzbekistan.

Athlete	Event	Round of 64	Round of 32	Round of 16	Quarterfinal	Semifinal	Final / BM	
Athlete	Event	Opposition Score	Opposition Score	Opposition Score	Opposition Score	Opposition Score	Opposition Score	Rank
Roman Petrov	Men's épée	Ma S-g (KOR); W 15–7	Yamada (JPN); L 13–15	Did not advance				

== Judo ==
Kyrgyzstan entered one male judoka into the Olympic tournament based on the International Judo Federation Olympics Individual Ranking.

Athlete	Event	Round of 64	Round of 32	Round of 16	Quarterfinals	Semifinals	Repechage	Final / BM	
Athlete	Event	Opposition Result	Opposition Result	Opposition Result	Opposition Result	Opposition Result	Opposition Result	Opposition Result	Rank
Vladimir Zoloev	Men's −81 kg	Bye	Khubetsov (ROC); L 00–10	Did not advance					

== Shooting ==
Kyrgyzstan granted an invitation from ISSF to send a women's rifle shooter to the Olympics, if the minimum qualifying score (MQS) was fulfilled by June 6, 2021, marking the nation's return to the sport for the first time since London 2012.

Athlete	Event	Qualification		Final	
Athlete	Event	Points	Rank	Points	Rank
Kanykei Kubanychbekova	Women's 10 m air rifle	612.8	48	Did not advance	

== Swimming ==
Kyrgyz swimmers further achieved qualifying standards in the following events (up to a maximum of 2 swimmers in each event at the Olympic Qualifying Time (OQT), and potentially 1 at the Olympic Selection Time (OST)):

Athlete	Event	Heat		Semifinal		Final	
Athlete	Event	Time	Rank	Time	Rank	Time	Rank
Denis Petrashov	Men's 100 m breaststroke	1:00.23	27	Did not advance			
Denis Petrashov	Men's 200 m breaststroke	2:10.07	18	Did not advance			

== Weightlifting ==
Kyrgyzstan entered one male weightlifter into the Olympic competition. Bekdoolot Rasulbekov topped the list of weightlifters from Asia in the men's 96 kg category based on the IWF Absolute Continental Rankings.

Athlete	Event	Snatch		Clean & jerk		Total	Rank
Athlete	Event	Result	Rank	Result	Rank	Total	Rank
Bekdoolot Rasulbekov	Men's −96 kg	166	8	208	4	374	6

== Wrestling ==
Kyrgyzstan qualified nine wrestlers for each of the following classes into the Olympic competition. Two of them finished among the top six to book Olympic spots in the men's Greco-Roman 87 kg and women's freestyle 62 kg at the 2019 World Championships, while seven additional licenses were awarded to the Kyrgyz wrestlers, who progressed to the top two finals of their respective weight categories at the 2021 Asian Qualification Tournament in Almaty, Kazakhstan.

Key:

- VT (ranking points: 5–0 or 0–5) – Victory by fall.
- VB (ranking points: 5–0 or 0–5) – Victory by injury (VF for forfeit, VA for withdrawal or disqualification)
- PP (ranking points: 3–1 or 1–3) – Decision by points – the loser with technical points.
- PO (ranking points: 3–0 or 0–3) – Decision by points – the loser without technical points.
- ST (ranking points: 4–0 or 0–4) – Great superiority – the loser without technical points and a margin of victory of at least 8 (Greco-Roman) or 10 (freestyle) points.
- SP (ranking points: 4–1 or 1–4) – Technical superiority – the loser with technical points and a margin of victory of at least 8 (Greco-Roman) or 10 (freestyle) points.

Freestyle

Athlete	Event	Round of 16	Quarterfinal	Semifinal	Repechage	Final / BM	
Athlete	Event	Opposition Result	Opposition Result	Opposition Result	Opposition Result	Opposition Result	Rank
Ernazar Akmataliev	Men's −65 kg	Punia (IND); L 1–3 ^{PP}	Did not advance				12
Aiaal Lazarev	Men's −125 kg	Steveson (USA); L 0–4 ^{ST}	Did not advance		Akgül (TUR); L 0–3 ^{PO}	Did not advance	16
Aisuluu Tynybekova	Women's −62 kg	Grigorjeva (LAT); W 3–0 ^{PO}	Incze (ROU); W 5–0 ^{VT}	Koliadenko (UKR); W 4–0 ^{ST}	—	Kawai (JPN); L 1–3 ^{PP}	2nd place, silver medalist(s)
Meerim Zhumanazarova	Women's −68 kg	Hristova (BUL); W 3–1 ^{PP}	Oborududu (NGR); L 1–3 ^{PP}	Did not advance	Manolova (AZE); W 3–1 ^{PP}	Soronzonbold (MGL); W 5–0 ^{VT}	3rd place, bronze medalist(s)
Aiperi Medet Kyzy	Women's −76 kg	Syzdykova (KAZ); W 3–1 ^{PP}	Vorobieva (ROC); W 4–0 ^{ST}	Gray (USA); L 1–3 ^{PP}	—	Adar (TUR); L 0–5 ^{VT}	5

Greco-Roman

Athlete	Event	Round of 16	Quarterfinal	Semifinal	Repechage	Final / BM	
Athlete	Event	Opposition Result	Opposition Result	Opposition Result	Opposition Result	Opposition Result	Rank
Zholaman Sharshenbekov	Men's −60 kg	Ainagulov (KAZ); W 4–0 ^{ST}	Ciobanu (MDA); L 0–4 ^{ST}	Did not advance			7
Akzhol Makhmudov	Men's −77 kg	Maafi (TUN); W 4–0 ^{ST}	Huseynov (AZE); W 4–1 ^{SP}	Chalyan (ARM); W 3–1 ^{PP}	—	T Lőrincz (HUN); L 1–3 ^{PP}	2nd place, silver medalist(s)
Atabek Azisbekov	Men's −87 kg	V Lőrincz (HUN); L 1–3 ^{PP}	Did not advance		Kudla (GER); L 1–4 ^{SP}	Did not advance	10
Uzur Dzhuzupbekov	Men's −97 kg	Aleksanyan (ARM); L 1–3 ^{PP}	Did not advance		Savolainen (FIN); L 1–3 ^{PP}	Did not advance	10
