= 2023 World Wrestling Championships – Women's freestyle 62 kg =

Women's freestyle 62 kg at the 2023 World Championships
- Venue: Štark Arena
- Dates: 20–21 September 2023
- Competitors: 34 from 31 nations

Medalists
gold medal	Aisuluu Tynybekova	Kyrgyzstan
silver medal	Sakura Motoki	Japan
bronze medal	Grace Bullen	Norway
bronze medal	Iryna Koliadenko	Ukraine

The women's freestyle 62 kg is a competition featured at the 2023 World Wrestling Championships, and was held in Belgrade, Serbia on 20 and 21 September 2023.

This freestyle wrestling competition consists of a single-elimination tournament, with a repechage used to determine the winner of two bronze medals. The two finalists face off for gold and silver medals. Each wrestler who loses to one of the two finalists moves into the repechage, culminating in a pair of bronze medal matches featuring the semifinal losers each facing the remaining repechage opponent from their half of the bracket.

== Results ==
Legend

- F — Won by fall

=== Finals ===
Semifinals		Final
Grace Bullen (NOR)	1
Sakura Motoki (JPN)	2	Sakura Motoki (JPN)	1
Luisa Niemesch (GER)	2	Aisuluu Tynybekova (KGZ)	4
Aisuluu Tynybekova (KGZ)	4

=== Top half ===
==== Section 1 ====
Round of 64
Elis Manolova (AZE)	1
Nathaly Grimán (VEN)	3

Round of 32
Kayla Miracle (USA)	12
Jo Su-been (KOR)	2
Viktoria Vesso (EST)	3
Kriszta Incze (ROU)	10
Nathaly Grimán (VEN)	0
Esther Kolawole (NGR)	10
Angelina Miranda (CPV)	0
Grace Bullen (NOR)	4^{F}

Round of 16
Kayla Miracle (USA)	3
Kriszta Incze (ROU)	6
Esther Kolawole (NGR)	1
Grace Bullen (NOR)	7^{F}

Quarterfinals
Kriszta Incze (ROU)	0
Grace Bullen (NOR)	10

==== Section 2 ====
Round of 64

Round of 32
Laís Nunes (BRA)	10
Lydia Pérez (ESP)	0
Elena Esposito (ITA)	0
Anastasija Grigorjeva (LAT)	10^{F}
Ariukhan Jumabaeva (UZB)	0
Sakura Motoki (JPN)	10
Nguyễn Thị Mỹ Hạnh (VIE)	1
Bilyana Dudova (BUL)	6

Round of 16
Laís Nunes (BRA)	10
Anastasija Grigorjeva (LAT)	0
Sakura Motoki (JPN)	4
Bilyana Dudova (BUL)	0

Quarterfinals
Laís Nunes (BRA)	0
Sakura Motoki (JPN)	10

=== Bottom half ===
==== Section 3 ====
Round of 64

Round of 32
Ana Godinez (CAN)	10
Alexis Gómez (MEX)	0
Pürevdorjiin Orkhon (MGL)	8
Long Jia (CHN)	5
Irina Kuznetsova (KAZ)	6^{F}
Alina Kasabieva (AIN)	2
Selvi İlyasoğlu (TUR)	0
Luisa Niemesch (GER)	6^{F}

Round of 16
Ana Godinez (CAN)	6
Pürevdorjiin Orkhon (MGL)	13
Irina Kuznetsova (KAZ)	4
Luisa Niemesch (GER)	8^{F}

Quarterfinals
Pürevdorjiin Orkhon (MGL)	3
Luisa Niemesch (GER)	4

==== Section 4 ====
Round of 64
Veranika Ivanova (AIN)	10
Jessica Derrell (BAR)	0

Round of 32
Johanna Lindborg (SWE)	6
Manisha Bhanwala (UWW)	1
Iryna Koliadenko (UKR)	6
Veranika Ivanova (AIN)	4
Mariana Cherdivara (MDA)	11
Leonela Ayoví (ECU)	0
Aleksandra Wólczyńska (POL)	2
Aisuluu Tynybekova (KGZ)	8^{F}

Round of 16
Johanna Lindborg (SWE)	0
Iryna Koliadenko (UKR)	10
Mariana Cherdivara (MDA)	0
Aisuluu Tynybekova (KGZ)	4^{F}

Quarterfinals
Iryna Koliadenko (UKR)	2
Aisuluu Tynybekova (KGZ)	2

=== Repechage ===
Repechage round 2
Ariukhan Jumabaeva (UZB)	0
Bilyana Dudova (BUL)	11
Aleksandra Wólczyńska (POL)	1
Mariana Cherdivara (MDA)	10^{F}

Repechage round 3
Bilyana Dudova (BUL)	1
Laís Nunes (BRA)	1
Mariana Cherdivara (MDA)	0
Iryna Koliadenko (UKR)	10

Bronze medals
Bilyana Dudova (BUL)	0
Grace Bullen (NOR)	3
Iryna Koliadenko (UKR)	10
Luisa Niemesch (GER)	0

Olympic wrestle-off
Bilyana Dudova (BUL)	2
Luisa Niemesch (GER)	3

== Final standing ==
Rank	Athlete
1st place, gold medalist(s)	Aisuluu Tynybekova (KGZ)
2nd place, silver medalist(s)	Sakura Motoki (JPN)
3rd place, bronze medalist(s)	Grace Bullen (NOR)
3rd place, bronze medalist(s)	Iryna Koliadenko (UKR)
5	Luisa Niemesch (GER)
5	Bilyana Dudova (BUL)
7	Mariana Cherdivara (MDA)
8	Laís Nunes (BRA)
9	Pürevdorjiin Orkhon (MGL)
10	Kriszta Incze (ROU)
11	Anastasija Grigorjeva (LAT)
12	Irina Kuznetsova (KAZ)
13	Ana Godinez (CAN)
14	Kayla Miracle (USA)
15	Veranika Ivanova (AIN)
16	Esther Kolawole (NGR)
17	Johanna Lindborg (SWE)
18	Nathaly Grimán (VEN)
19	Long Jia (CHN)
20	Viktoria Vesso (EST)
21	Jo Su-been (KOR)
22	Elis Manolova (AZE)
23	Nguyễn Thị Mỹ Hạnh (VIE)
24	Manisha Bhanwala (UWW)
25	Aleksandra Wólczyńska (POL)
26	Alina Kasabieva (AIN)
27	Angelina Miranda (CPV)
28	Selvi İlyasoğlu (TUR)
29	Lydia Pérez (ESP)
30	Elena Esposito (ITA)
31	Alexis Gómez (MEX)
32	Jessica Derrell (BAR)
33	Leonela Ayoví (ECU)
34	Ariukhan Jumabaeva (UZB)

Qualified for the 2024 Summer Olympics
