= 2017 European Wrestling Championships – Women's freestyle 58 kg =

The women's freestyle 58 kg is a competition featured at the 2017 European Wrestling Championships, and was held in Novi Sad, Serbia on May 5.

== Medalists ==
Gold	Grace Bullen (NOR)
Silver	Mariana Cherdivara (MDA)
Bronze	Laura Mertens (GER)
Bronze	Emese Barka (HUN)

== Results ==
Legend

- F — Won by fall

=== Main Bracket ===
Qualification
Elin Nilsson (SWE)	7^{F}
Kateryna Zhydachevska (ROU)	0
Katarzyna Mądrowska (POL)	4
Grace Bullen (NOR)	12
Carola Rainero (ITA)	0
Nataliya Synyshyn (AZE)	4^{F}
Zalina Sidakova (BLR)	1
Valeria Koblova (RUS)	8
Derya Bayhan (TUR)	2
Emese Barka (HUN)	12

Quarterfinals
Iryna Khariv (UKR)	4
Laura Mertens (GER)	6
Mariana Cherdivara (MDA)	5
Elin Nilsson (SWE)	0
Grace Bullen (NOR)	4
Nataliya Synyshyn (AZE)	2
Valeria Koblova (RUS)	6
Emese Barka (HUN)	7

Semifinals
Laura Mertens (GER)	2
Mariana Cherdivara (MDA)	4
Grace Bullen (NOR)	10
Emese Barka (HUN)	9

Final
Mariana Cherdivara (MDA)	3
Grace Bullen (NOR)	3

=== Repechage ===
Repechage round 2
Katarzyna Mądrowska (POL)	0
Nataliya Synyshyn (AZE)	10

Bronze medals
Elin Nilsson (SWE)	3
Laura Mertens (GER)	3
Nataliya Synyshyn (AZE)	2
Emese Barka (HUN)	6
