= 2017 World Wrestling Championships – Women's freestyle 58 kg =

Women's freestyle 58 kg at the 2017 World Championships
- Venue: AccorHotels Arena
- Dates: 23 August 2017
- Competitors: 27 from 27 nations

Medalists
gold medal	Helen Maroulis	United States
silver medal	Marwa Amri	Tunisia
bronze medal	Michelle Fazzari	Canada
bronze medal	Aisuluu Tynybekova	Kyrgyzstan

The women's freestyle 58 kilograms is a competition featured at the 2017 World Wrestling Championships, and was held in Paris, France on 23 August 2017.

This freestyle wrestling competition consisted of a single-elimination tournament, with a repechage used to determine the winners of two bronze medals.

== Results ==
Legend

- F — Won by fall
- R — Retired

=== Final ===
Final
Helen Maroulis (USA)	11
Marwa Amri (TUN)	0

=== Top half ===
Round of 32
Giedrė Blekaitytė (LTU)	10^{F}
Ariadne Burkhart (AUS)	0
Ayşe Vatansever (TUR)	2
Eva González (COL)	5
Đào Thị Hương (VIE)	0
Yessica Oviedo (DOM)	12
Helen Maroulis (USA)	10
Kim Han-bit (KOR)	0
Katsiaryna Hanchar (BLR)	4
Elin Nilsson (SWE)	8

Round of 16
Valeria Koblova (RUS)	1^{R}
Michelle Fazzari (CAN)	2
Irina Netreba (AZE)	8
Giedrė Blekaitytė (LTU)	4
Eva González (COL)	4
Yessica Oviedo (DOM)	5
Helen Maroulis (USA)	10
Elin Nilsson (SWE)	0

Quarterfinals
Michelle Fazzari (CAN)	11
Irina Netreba (AZE)	0
Yessica Oviedo (DOM)	0
Helen Maroulis (USA)	11

Semifinals
Michelle Fazzari (CAN)	0
Helen Maroulis (USA)	10

=== Bottom half ===
Round of 32
Iryna Chykhradze (UKR)	12^{F}
Katsuki Sakagami (JPN)	4
Jowita Wrzesień (POL)	2
Rong Ningning (CHN)	12
Pooja Dhanda (IND)	4^{F}
Sonia Baudin (FRA)	0
Aminat Adeniyi (NGR)	9
Grace Bullen (NOR)	8
Altansetsegiin Battsetseg (MGL)	9^{F}
Gulshaharat Talassova (KAZ)	2
Jessica Olivares (PER)	2
Laura Mertens (GER)	12

Round of 16
Marwa Amri (TUN)	8
Iryna Chykhradze (UKR)	1
Rong Ningning (CHN)	12
Pooja Dhanda (IND)	8
Aminat Adeniyi (NGR)	2
Altansetsegiin Battsetseg (MGL)	1
Laura Mertens (GER)	0
Aisuluu Tynybekova (KGZ)	6

Quarterfinals
Marwa Amri (TUN)	7
Rong Ningning (CHN)	6
Aminat Adeniyi (NGR)	3
Aisuluu Tynybekova (KGZ)	4

Semifinals
Marwa Amri (TUN)	8
Aisuluu Tynybekova (KGZ)	7

=== Repechage ===
Repechage round 1
Kim Han-bit (KOR)	1
Elin Nilsson (SWE)	4

Repechage round 2
Elin Nilsson (SWE)	4
Yessica Oviedo (DOM)	4
Iryna Chykhradze (UKR)	1
Rong Ningning (CHN)	12

Bronze medals
Elin Nilsson (SWE)	0
Michelle Fazzari (CAN)	7
Rong Ningning (CHN)	5
Aisuluu Tynybekova (KGZ)	6
