= 2016 European Wrestling Championships – Women's freestyle 58 kg =

The women's freestyle 58 kg is a competition featured at the 2016 European Wrestling Championships, and was held in Riga, Latvia on March 11.

== Medalists ==
Gold	Nataliya Synyshyn; Azerbaijan
Silver	Grace Bullen; Norway
Bronze	Hanna Vasylenko; Ukraine
Bronze	Mimi Hristova; Bulgaria

== Results ==
Legend

- F — Won by fall

=== Top half ===
==== Section 1 ====
Round of 16
Carola Rainero (ITA)	0
Ganna Vasylenko (UKR)	8^{F}
Veranika Ivanova (BLR)	2
Nataliya Synyshyn (AZE)	4
Viktorija Lukjaneca (LAT)	0
Derya Bayhan (TUR)	6^{F}
Elin Nilsson (SWE)	4
Iuliia Alborova (RUS)	0
Mimi Hristova (BUL)	4
Emese Barka (HUN)	2
Agnieszka Krol (POL)	0
Grace Bullen (NOR)	6^{F}
Irene Garcia Garrido (ESP)	1
Mariana Eșanu (MDA)	7
Luisa Niemesch (GER)	11
Aurelie Basset (FRA)	0

Quarterfinals
Ganna Vasylenko (UKR)	0
Nataliya Synyshyn (AZE)	5
Derya Bayhan (TUR)	0
Elin Nilsson (SWE)	4^{F}
Mimi Hristova (BUL)	6
Grace Bullen (NOR)	7
Mariana Eșanu (MDA)	6
Luisa Niemesch (GER)	12

Semifinals
Nataliya Synyshyn (AZE)	12
Elin Nilsson (SWE)	2
Grace Bullen (NOR)	6
Luisa Niemesch (GER)	3

Final
Nataliya Synyshyn (AZE)	3
Grace Bullen (NOR)	1

=== Repechage ===
Repechage round 2
Veranika Ivanova (BLR)	3
Ganna Vasylenko (UKR)	4
Agnieszka Krol (POL)	0
Mimi Hristova (BUL)	6^{F}

Bronze medals
Ganna Vasylenko (UKR)	4
Elin Nilsson (SWE)	2
Mimi Hristova (BUL)	8^{F}
Luisa Niemesch (GER)	0
