= Grace Bullen =

Norwegian freestyle wrestler

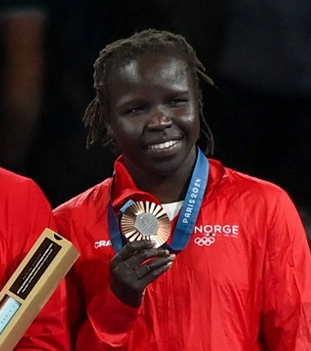
- Bullen at the 2024 Summer Olympics

Personal information
- Full name: Grace Jacob Bullen
- Born: 7 February 1997 (age 29) Ghinda, Eritrea

Sport
- Country: Norway
- Sport: Amateur wrestling
- Weight class: 57 kg; 59 kg; 62 kg
- Event: Freestyle
- Coached by: Zurabi Iakobishvili
Medal record
Women's freestyle wrestling
Representing Norway
Olympic Games
Bronze medal – third place	2024 Paris	62 kg
World Championships
Silver medal – second place	2022 Belgrade	59 kg
Bronze medal – third place	2023 Belgrade	62 kg
European Championships
Gold medal – first place	2017 Novi Sad	58 kg
Gold medal – first place	2020 Rome	57 kg
Gold medal – first place	2024 Bucharest	62 kg
Gold medal – first place	2025 Bratislava	65 kg
Silver medal – second place	2016 Riga	58 kg
Silver medal – second place	2023 Zagreb	62 kg
European Games
Bronze medal – third place	2015 Baku	58 kg
Golden Grand Prix Ivan Yarygin
Bronze medal – third place	2019 Krasnoyarsk	57 kg
Dan Kolov - Nikola Petrov Tournament
Silver medal – second place	2019 Ruse	57 kg
Grand Prix
Gold medal – first place	2018 Klippan	59 kg
Gold medal – first place	2022 Rome	59 kg
World U23 Championships
Gold medal – first place	2018 Bucharest	59 kg
World Juniors Championships
Bronze medal – third place	2017 Tampere	59 kg
European Juniors Championships
Gold medal – first place	2015 İstanbul	59 kg
Gold medal – first place	2016 Bucharest	59 kg
Gold medal – first place	2017 Dortmund	59 kg
Summer Youth Olympics
Gold medal – first place	2014 Nanjing	60 kg
World Cadets Championships
Gold medal – first place	2014 Snina	60 kg
European Cadets Championships
Gold medal – first place	2013 Bar	60 kg
Gold medal – first place	2014 Samokov	60 kg
Bronze medal – third place	2012 Katowice	56 kg

Grace Jacob Bullen (born 7 February 1997) is a Norwegian freestyle wrestler. She is an Olympic bronze medallist, World Championships silver and bronze medallist, four-time European champion, and European Games bronze medallist. Bullen won a bronze medal in the women's 62 kg event at the 2024 Summer Olympics, and the gold medal at the European Championships in 2017, 2020, 2024, and 2025.

Bullen is also a U23 world champion and three-time European junior champion. She won the gold medal at the World U23 Championships in 2018 and the European Juniors Wrestling Championship in 2015, 2016, and 2017.

== Early life ==
Born in a refugee camp in Eritrea to South Sudanese parents, she moved to Fredrikstad, Norway in 2001 at the age of four. Already at the age of four she took up wrestling in the martial arts club Atlas.

== Career ==
At the 2014 Summer Youth Olympics held in Nanjing, China, Bullen represented Norway and she won the gold medal in the girls' 60 kg event. In the final, she defeated Pei Xingru of China. In 2015, she represented Norway at the European Games held in Baku, Azerbaijan and she won one of the bronze medals in the women's 58 kg event. She lost her first match against Emese Barka of Hungary and entered the repechage. Here she won against Valeria Koblova by walkover and she defeated Irina Netreba of Azerbaijan in the bronze medal match. Bullen also competed in the women's 58 kg event at the 2015 World Wrestling Championships held in Las Vegas, United States where she was eliminated in her second match by Marianna Sastin of Hungary.

In 2016, Bullen won the silver medal in the women's 58 kg at the European Wrestling Championships held in Riga, Latvia. In the final, she lost against Nataliya Synyshyn of Azerbaijan. The following year, she won the gold medal in the same event at the 2017 European Wrestling Championships held in Novi Sad, Serbia. In the final, she defeated Mariana Cherdivara of Moldova. In the same year, Bullen was eliminated in her first match in the women's 58 kg event at the 2017 World Wrestling Championships held in Paris, France.

In 2018, Bullen competed in the 57 kg event at the World Wrestling Championships held in Budapest, Hungary. She won her first match against Giullia Penalber of Brazil and her next match against Jong In-sun of North Korea. She then lost her next match against Rong Ningning of China; Rong went on to win the gold medal. Bullen then failed to secure the bronze medal in her match against Pooja Dhanda of India. A month later, at the 2018 World U23 Wrestling Championship held in Bucharest, Romania, she won the gold medal in the women's 59 kg event.

In 2019, Bullen won one of the bronze medals in the women's 57 kg event at the Golden Grand Prix Ivan Yarygin held in Krasnoyarsk, Russia. In the same year, she also competed in the 57 kg event at the 2019 European Games held in Minsk, Belarus where she lost her bronze medal match against Anastasia Nichita of Moldova. In 2020, Bullen won the gold medal in the 57 kg event at the European Wrestling Championships held in Rome, Italy. In the final, she defeated Alina Akobiia of Ukraine.

In March 2021, Bullen competed at the European Qualification Tournament in Budapest, Hungary hoping to qualify for the 2020 Summer Olympics in Tokyo, Japan. Her hopes were dashed when she was eliminated in her first match by Bediha Gün of Turkey. A month later, she was eliminated in her second match in the 59 kg event at the 2021 European Wrestling Championships held in Warsaw, Poland. In May 2021, she failed to qualify for the Olympics at the World Qualification Tournament held in Sofia, Bulgaria. She won her first two matches but she was then eliminated in the semi-finals by Veronika Chumikova. In October 2021, she was eliminated in her first match in the women's 59 kg event at the World Wrestling Championships held in Oslo, Norway.

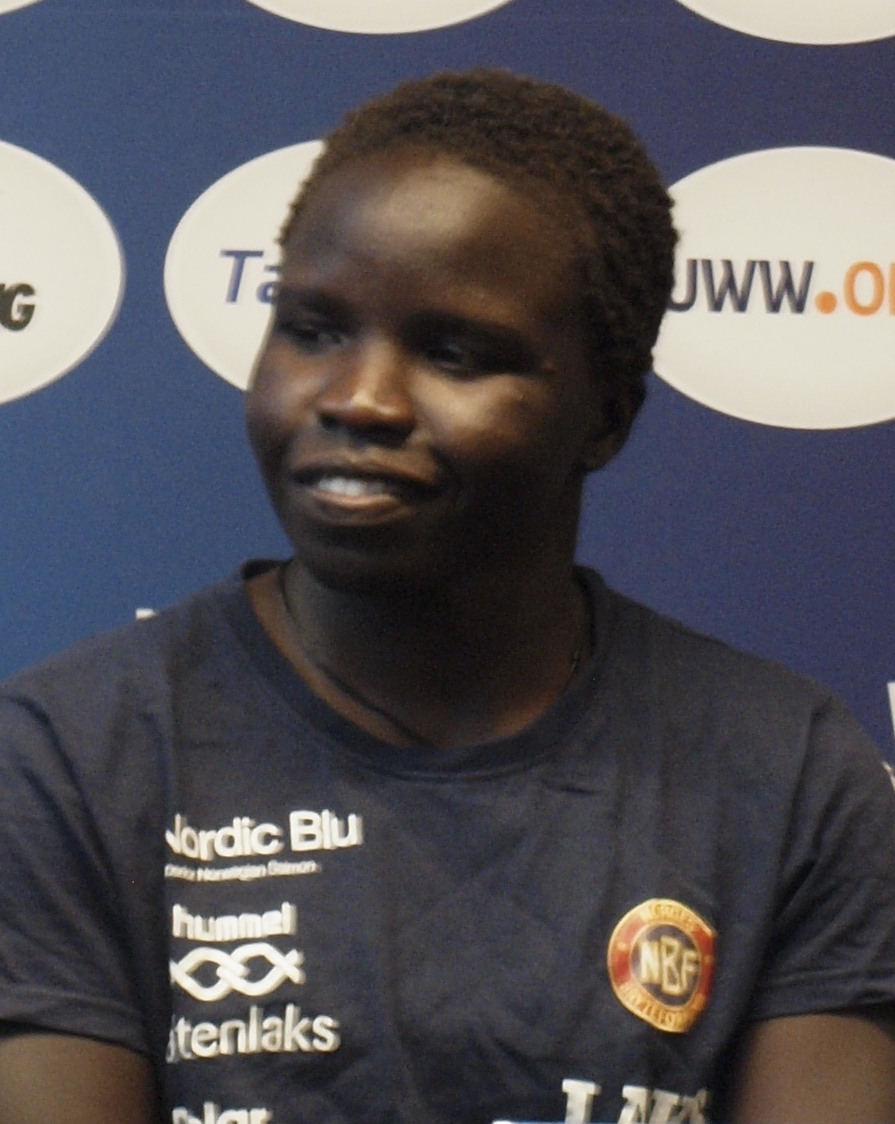
Bullen at the 2021 World Championships.

In 2022, Bullen won the gold medal in her event at the Matteo Pellicone Ranking Series 2022 held in Rome, Italy. She won the silver medal in the 59 kg event at the 2022 World Wrestling Championships held in Belgrade, Serbia.

Bullen won the silver medal in the 62 kg event at the 2023 European Wrestling Championships held in Zagreb, Croatia. She won one of the bronze medals in the 62 kg event at the 2023 World Wrestling Championships held in Belgrade, Serbia. As a result, she earned a quota place for Norway for the 2024 Summer Olympics in Paris, France.

Bullen won the gold medal in the 62 kg event at the 2024 European Wrestling Championships held in Bucharest, Romania. She defeated Luisa Niemesch of Germany in her gold medal match.

Bullen won one of the bronze medals in the women's 62 kg event at the 2024 Summer Olympics in Paris, France. She defeated Ana Godinez of Canada in her bronze medal match.

In 2025, Bullen won the gold medal in the 65 kg event at the European Wrestling Championships held in Bratislava, Slovakia.

== Achievements ==
Year	Tournament	Location	Result	Event
2015	European Games	Baku, Azerbaijan	3rd	Freestyle 58 kg
2016	European Championships	Riga, Latvia	2nd	Freestyle 58 kg
2017	European Championships	Novi Sad, Serbia	1st	Freestyle 58 kg
2020	European Championships	Rome, Italy	1st	Freestyle 57 kg
2022	World Championships	Belgrade, Serbia	2nd	Freestyle 59 kg
2023	European Championships	Zagreb, Croatia	2nd	Freestyle 62 kg
2023	World Championships	Belgrade, Serbia	3rd	Freestyle 62 kg
2024	European Championships	Bucharest, Romania	1st	Freestyle 62 kg
2024	Summer Olympics	Paris, France	3rd	Freestyle 62 kg
2025	European Championships	Bratislava, Slovakia	1st	Freestyle 65 kg
