= Wrestling at the 2020 Summer Olympics =

Wrestling at the Games of the XXXII Olympiad
- Venue: Makuhari Messe
- Dates: 1–7 August 2021
- No. of events: 18
- Competitors: 289 from 61 nations

Wrestling at the 2020 Summer Olympics in Tokyo featured two disciplines, freestyle and Greco-Roman, which were further divided into different weight categories. Men competed in both disciplines whereas women only participated in the freestyle events, with 18 gold medals awarded. Wrestling had been contested at every modern Summer Olympic Games, except Paris 1900.

Around 288 wrestlers were expected to compete in 18 events at the 2020 Summer Olympics which was postponed in March 2020 and planned for 2021 as a result of the COVID-19 pandemic.

== Competition format ==
16 wrestlers compete in each division. The competition consists of a single-elimination tournament, with a repechage used to determine the winner of two bronze medals. The two finalists face off for gold and silver medals. Each wrestler who loses to one of the two finalists moves into the repechage, culminating in a pair of bronze medal matches featuring the semifinal losers each facing the remaining repechage opponent from their half of the bracket.

== Competition schedule ==
| R | Repechage | R16 | Round of 16 | QF | Quarter-Finals | SF | Semi-Finals | F | Finals |

Schedule
| Event↓/Date → | Aug 1 | | | Aug 2 | | | Aug 3 | | | Aug 4 | | | Aug 5 | | | Aug 6 | | | Aug 7 | | |
|---|---|---|---|---|---|---|---|---|---|---|---|---|---|---|---|---|---|---|---|---|---|
| | M | | E | M | | E | M | | E | M | | E | M | | E | M | | E | M | E | |
Men's Freestyle
| 57kg | | | | | | | | | | R16 | QF | SF | R | | F | | | | | | |
| 65kg | | | | | | | | | | | | | | | | R16 | QF | SF | | R | F |
| 74kg | | | | | | | | | | | | | R16 | QF | SF | R | | F | | | |
| 86kg | | | | | | | | | | R16 | QF | SF | R | | F | | | | | | |
| 97kg | | | | | | | | | | | | | | | | R16 | QF | SF | | R | F |
| 125kg | | | | | | | | | | | | | R16 | QF | SF | R | | F | | | |
Women's Freestyle
| 50kg | | | | | | | | | | | | | | | | R16 | QF | SF | | R | F |
| 53kg | | | | | | | | | | | | | R16 | QF | SF | R | | F | | | |
| 57kg | | | | | | | | | | R16 | QF | SF | R | | F | | | | | | |
| 62kg | | | | | | | R16 | QF | SF | R | | F | | | | | | | | | |
| 68kg | | | | R16 | QF | SF | R | | F | | | | | | | | | | | | |
| 76kg | R16 | QF | SF | R | | F | | | | | | | | | | | | | | | |
Men's Greco-Roman
| 60kg | R16 | QF | SF | R | | F | | | | | | | | | | | | | | | |
| 67kg | | | | | | | R16 | QF | SF | R | | F | | | | | | | | | |
| 77kg | | | | R16 | QF | SF | R | | F | | | | | | | | | | | | |
| 87kg | | | | | | | R16 | QF | SF | R | | F | | | | | | | | | |
| 97kg | | | | R16 | QF | SF | R | | F | | | | | | | | | | | | |
| 130kg | R16 | QF | SF | R | | F | | | | | | | | | | | | | | | |

== Medalists ==
=== Men's freestyle ===
| Event | Gold | Silver | Bronze |
|---|---|---|---|
| 57 kg | Zaur Uguev; ROC | Ravi Kumar; India | Nurislam Sanayev; Kazakhstan |
| 57 kg | Zaur Uguev; ROC | Ravi Kumar; India | Thomas Gilman; United States |
| 65 kg | Takuto Otoguro; Japan | Haji Aliyev; Azerbaijan | Gadzhimurad Rashidov; ROC |
| 65 kg | Takuto Otoguro; Japan | Haji Aliyev; Azerbaijan | Bajrang Punia; India |
| 74 kg | Zaurbek Sidakov; ROC | Mahamedkhabib Kadzimahamedau; Belarus | Kyle Dake; United States |
| 74 kg | Zaurbek Sidakov; ROC | Mahamedkhabib Kadzimahamedau; Belarus | Bekzod Abdurakhmonov; Uzbekistan |
| 86 kg | David Taylor; United States | Hassan Yazdani; Iran | Artur Naifonov; ROC |
| 86 kg | David Taylor; United States | Hassan Yazdani; Iran | Myles Amine; San Marino |
| 97 kg | Abdulrashid Sadulaev; ROC | Kyle Snyder; United States | Reineris Salas; Cuba |
| 97 kg | Abdulrashid Sadulaev; ROC | Kyle Snyder; United States | Abraham Conyedo; Italy |
| 125 kg | Gable Steveson; United States | Geno Petriashvili; Georgia | Amir Hossein Zare; Iran |
| 125 kg | Gable Steveson; United States | Geno Petriashvili; Georgia | Taha Akgül; Turkey |

=== Men's Greco-Roman ===
| Event | Gold | Silver | Bronze |
|---|---|---|---|
| 60 kg | Luis Orta; Cuba | Kenichiro Fumita; Japan | Walihan Sailike; China |
| 60 kg | Luis Orta; Cuba | Kenichiro Fumita; Japan | Sergey Emelin; ROC |
| 67 kg | Mohammad Reza Geraei; Iran | Parviz Nasibov; Ukraine | Frank Stäbler; Germany |
| 67 kg | Mohammad Reza Geraei; Iran | Parviz Nasibov; Ukraine | Mohamed Ibrahim El-Sayed; Egypt |
| 77 kg | Tamás Lőrincz; Hungary | Akzhol Makhmudov; Kyrgyzstan | Shohei Yabiku; Japan |
| 77 kg | Tamás Lőrincz; Hungary | Akzhol Makhmudov; Kyrgyzstan | Rafig Huseynov; Azerbaijan |
| 87 kg | Zhan Beleniuk; Ukraine | Viktor Lőrincz; Hungary | Denis Kudla; Germany |
| 87 kg | Zhan Beleniuk; Ukraine | Viktor Lőrincz; Hungary | Ivan Huklek; Croatia |
| 97 kg | Musa Evloev; ROC | Artur Aleksanyan; Armenia | Tadeusz Michalik; Poland |
| 97 kg | Musa Evloev; ROC | Artur Aleksanyan; Armenia | Mohammad Hadi Saravi; Iran |
| 130 kg | Mijaín López; Cuba | Iakobi Kajaia; Georgia | Rıza Kayaalp; Turkey |
| 130 kg | Mijaín López; Cuba | Iakobi Kajaia; Georgia | Sergey Semenov; ROC |

=== Women's freestyle ===
| Event | Gold | Silver | Bronze |
|---|---|---|---|
| 50 kg | Yui Susaki; Japan | Sun Yanan; China | Mariya Stadnik; Azerbaijan |
| 50 kg | Yui Susaki; Japan | Sun Yanan; China | Sarah Hildebrandt; United States |
| 53 kg | Mayu Mukaida; Japan | Pang Qianyu; China | Vanesa Kaladzinskaya; Belarus |
| 53 kg | Mayu Mukaida; Japan | Pang Qianyu; China | Bat-Ochiryn Bolortuyaa; Mongolia |
| 57 kg | Risako Kawai; Japan | Iryna Kurachkina; Belarus | Helen Maroulis; United States |
| 57 kg | Risako Kawai; Japan | Iryna Kurachkina; Belarus | Evelina Nikolova; Bulgaria |
| 62 kg | Yukako Kawai; Japan | Aisuluu Tynybekova; Kyrgyzstan | Iryna Koliadenko; Ukraine |
| 62 kg | Yukako Kawai; Japan | Aisuluu Tynybekova; Kyrgyzstan | Taybe Yusein; Bulgaria |
| 68 kg | Tamyra Mensah-Stock; United States | Blessing Oborududu; Nigeria | Alla Cherkasova; Ukraine |
| 68 kg | Tamyra Mensah-Stock; United States | Blessing Oborududu; Nigeria | Meerim Zhumanazarova; Kyrgyzstan |
| 76 kg | Aline Rotter-Focken; Germany | Adeline Gray; United States | Yasemin Adar; Turkey |
| 76 kg | Aline Rotter-Focken; Germany | Adeline Gray; United States | Zhou Qian; China |

== Medal table ==
| Rank | Nation | Gold | Silver | Bronze | Total |
|---|---|---|---|---|---|
| 1 | Japan | 5 | 1 | 1 | 7 |
| 2 | ROC | 4 | 0 | 4 | 8 |
| 3 | United States | 3 | 2 | 4 | 9 |
| 4 | Cuba | 2 | 0 | 1 | 3 |
| 5 | Iran | 1 | 1 | 2 | 4 |
| 5 | Ukraine | 1 | 1 | 2 | 4 |
| 7 | Hungary | 1 | 1 | 0 | 2 |
| 8 | Germany | 1 | 0 | 2 | 3 |
| 9 | China | 0 | 2 | 2 | 4 |
| 10 | Belarus | 0 | 2 | 1 | 3 |
| 10 | Kyrgyzstan | 0 | 2 | 1 | 3 |
| 12 | Georgia | 0 | 2 | 0 | 2 |
| 13 | Azerbaijan | 0 | 1 | 2 | 3 |
| 14 | India | 0 | 1 | 1 | 2 |
| 15 | Armenia | 0 | 1 | 0 | 1 |
| 15 | Nigeria | 0 | 1 | 0 | 1 |
| 17 | Turkey | 0 | 0 | 3 | 3 |
| 18 | Bulgaria | 0 | 0 | 2 | 2 |
| 19 | Croatia | 0 | 0 | 1 | 1 |
| 19 | Egypt | 0 | 0 | 1 | 1 |
| 19 | Italy | 0 | 0 | 1 | 1 |
| 19 | Kazakhstan | 0 | 0 | 1 | 1 |
| 19 | Mongolia | 0 | 0 | 1 | 1 |
| 19 | Poland | 0 | 0 | 1 | 1 |
| 19 | San Marino | 0 | 0 | 1 | 1 |
| 19 | Uzbekistan | 0 | 0 | 1 | 1 |
| Totals (26 entries) | | 18 | 18 | 36 | 72 |

== Participating nations ==
There are 61 participating nations:

- Algeria (8)
- Argentina (1)
- Armenia (6)
- Azerbaijan (7)
- Belarus (8)
- Brazil (3)
- Bulgaria (7)
- Cameroon (1)
- Canada (4)
- Chile (1)
- China (11)
- Colombia (3)
- Croatia (2)
- Cuba (12)
- Czech Republic (1)
- Denmark (1)
- Ecuador (2)
- Egypt (8)
- Estonia (2)
- Finland (2)
- France (2)
- Georgia (7)
- Germany (7)
- Greece (2)
- Guam (1)
- Guinea (1)
- Guinea-Bissau (2)
- Hungary (6)
- India (7)
- Iran (11)
- Italy (2)
- Japan (12)
- Kazakhstan (11)
- Kosovo (1)
- Kyrgyzstan (9)
- Latvia (1)
- Lithuania (1)
- Mexico (2)
- Moldova (2)
- Mongolia (9)
- Morocco (1)
- Nigeria (5)
- North Macedonia (1)
- Peru (1)
- Poland (6)
- Puerto Rico (1)
- Refugee Olympic Team (1)
- ROC (17)
- Romania (5)
- San Marino (1)
- Senegal (1)
- Serbia (4)
- Slovakia (1)
- South Korea (2)
- Sweden (3)
- Switzerland (1)
- Tunisia (10)
- Turkey (9)
- Ukraine (10)
- United States (15)
- Uzbekistan (8)

== See also ==
- Wrestling at the 2018 Asian Games
- Wrestling at the 2018 Summer Youth Olympics
- Wrestling at the 2019 European Games
- Wrestling at the 2019 Pan American Games
- Wrestling at the 2019 African Games
