= Wrestling at the 2020 Summer Olympics – Women's freestyle 62 kg =

Women's freestyle 62 kg at the Games of the XXXII Olympiad
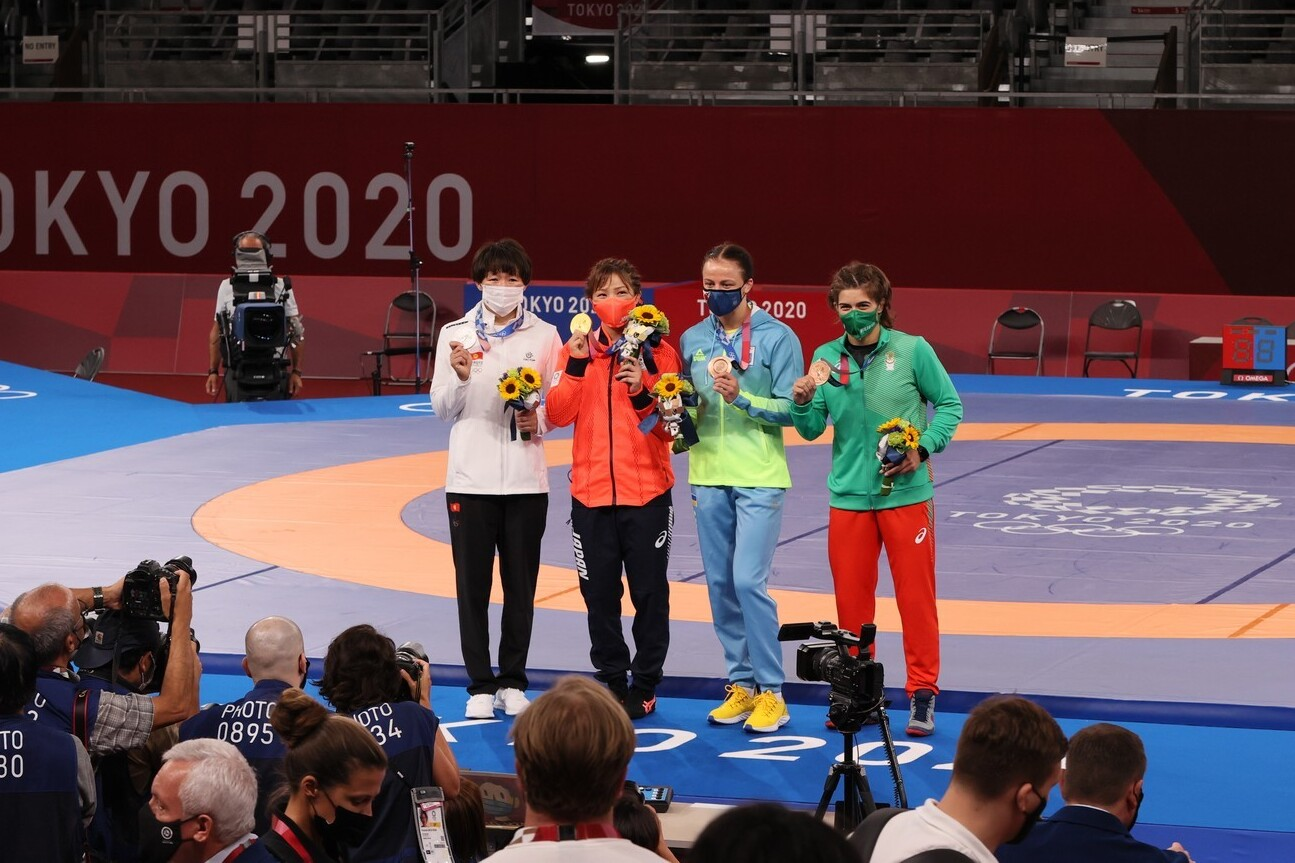
- Venue: Makuhari Messe
- Date: 3–4 August 2021
- Competitors: 16 from 16 nations

Medalists
| 1st place, gold medalist(s) | | Yukako Kawai | Japan |
| 2nd place, silver medalist(s) | | Aisuluu Tynybekova | Kyrgyzstan |
| 3rd place, bronze medalist(s) | | Iryna Koliadenko | Ukraine |
| 3rd place, bronze medalist(s) | | Taybe Yusein | Bulgaria |

The women's freestyle 62 kilograms competition at the 2020 Summer Olympics in Tokyo, Japan, took place on 3–4 August 2021 at the Makuhari Messe in Mihama-ku. The qualification rounds were held on 3 August while medal matches were held on the 2nd day of the competition.

This freestyle wrestling competition consists of a single-elimination tournament, with a repechage used to determine the winner of two bronze medals. The two finalists face off for gold and silver medals. Each wrestler who loses to one of the two finalists moves into the repechage, culminating in a pair of bronze medal matches featuring the semifinal losers each facing the remaining repechage opponent from their half of the bracket.

Yukako Kawai from Japan won the gold medal after beating the World Champion Aisuluu Tynybekova from Kyrgyzstan 4–3 in the gold medal match.

== Schedule ==
All times are Japan Standard Time (UTC+09:00)

| Date | Time | Event |
|---|---|---|
| 3 August 2021 | 11:00 | Qualification rounds |
| 3 August 2021 | 18:15 | Semifinals |
| 4 August 2021 | 11:00 | Repechage |
| 4 August 2021 | 19:30 | Finals |

== Results ==
Legend

- F — Won by fall

=== Main bracket ===
1/8 finals
Aisuluu Tynybekova (KGZ) | 8
Anastasija Grigorjeva (LAT) | 0
Marianna Sastin (HUN) | 1
Kriszta Incze (ROU) | 3
Aminat Adeniyi (NGR) | 4
Iryna Koliadenko (UKR) | 2^{F}
Long Jia (CHN) | 3
Kayla Miracle (USA) | 2
Yukako Kawai (JPN) | 10
Lyubov Ovcharova (ROC) | 0
Marwa Amri (TUN) | 1
Henna Johansson (SWE) | 5
Khürelkhüügiin Bolortuyaa (MGL) | 2
Sonam Malik (IND) | 2
Laís Nunes (BRA) | 1
Taybe Yusein (BUL) | 4

1/4 finals
Aisuluu Tynybekova (KGZ) | 6^{F}
Kriszta Incze (ROU) | 0
Iryna Koliadenko (UKR) | 4^{F}
Long Jia (CHN) | 0
Yukako Kawai (JPN) | 10
Henna Johansson (SWE) | 2
Khürelkhüügiin Bolortuyaa (MGL) | 0
Taybe Yusein (BUL) | 10

Semifinals
Aisuluu Tynybekova (KGZ) | 10
Iryna Koliadenko (UKR) | 0
Yukako Kawai (JPN) | 3
Taybe Yusein (BUL) | 2

Final
Aisuluu Tynybekova (KGZ) | 3
Yukako Kawai (JPN) | 4

=== Repechage ===
Repechage
Anastasija Grigorjeva (LAT) | 14
Kriszta Incze (ROU) | 7
Lyubov Ovcharova (ROC) | 8
Henna Johansson (SWE) | 7

Bronze medal matches
Anastasija Grigorjeva (LAT) | 1
Iryna Koliadenko (UKR) | 3
Lyubov Ovcharova (ROC) | 0
Taybe Yusein (BUL) | 10

== Final standing ==
| Rank | Athlete |
|---|---|
| 1st place, gold medalist(s) | Yukako Kawai (JPN) |
| 2nd place, silver medalist(s) | Aisuluu Tynybekova (KGZ) |
| 3rd place, bronze medalist(s) | Iryna Koliadenko (UKR) |
| 3rd place, bronze medalist(s) | Taybe Yusein (BUL) |
| 5 | Anastasija Grigorjeva (LAT) |
| 5 | Lyubov Ovcharova (ROC) |
| 7 | Henna Johansson (SWE) |
| 8 | Kriszta Incze (ROU) |
| 9 | Long Jia (CHN) |
| 10 | Khürelkhüügiin Bolortuyaa (MGL) |
| 11 | Sonam Malik (IND) |
| 12 | Kayla Miracle (USA) |
| 13 | Marianna Sastin (HUN) |
| 14 | Laís Nunes (BRA) |
| 15 | Marwa Amri (TUN) |
| 16 | Aminat Adeniyi (NGR) |
