= Yelena Komarova =

Azerbaijani wrestler (born 1985)

Personal information
- Nationality: Azerbaijan
- Born: 13 July 1985 (age 41)
- Height: 1.62 m (5 ft 4 in)
- Weight: 55 kg (121 lb)

Sport
- Sport: Wrestling
- Event: Freestyle
- Club: Kolos-Spartak Kherson (UKR)
- Coached by: Viktor Lushnikov

Yelena Komarova (born July 13, 1985) is an amateur Azerbaijani wrestler, who played for the women's featherweight category. Komarova qualified for the women's 55 kg class at the 2008 Summer Olympics in Beijing by winning the championship title from the Golden Grand Prix in Baku. She lost the first preliminary match to Russia's Nataliya Golts, who was able to score five points in two straight periods, leaving Komarova without a single point.
