= 2025 World Wrestling Championships – Women's freestyle 62 kg =

Wrestling competitions

Women's freestyle 62 kg at the 2025 World Championships
- Venue: Arena Zagreb
- Dates: 17–18 September 2025
- Competitors: 22 from 20 nations

Medalists
gold medal	Sakura Motoki	Japan
silver medal	Kim Ok-ju	North Korea
bronze medal	Pürevdorjiin Orkhon	Mongolia
bronze medal	Amina Tandelova

The women's freestyle 62 kilograms is a competition featured at the 2025 World Wrestling Championships, and was held in Zagreb, Croatia on 17 and 18 September 2025.

This freestyle wrestling competition consists of a single-elimination tournament, with a repechage used to determine the winner of two bronze medals. The two finalists face off for gold and silver medals. Each wrestler who loses to one of the two finalists moves into the repechage, culminating in a pair of bronze medal matches, featuring the semifinal losers each facing the remaining repechage opponent from their half of the bracket.

== Results ==
Legend

- F — Won by fall
- R — Retired
- WO — Won by walkover

=== Final ===
Final
Sakura Motoki (JPN)	5
Kim Ok-ju (PRK)	4

=== Top half ===
Round of 32
Lili (CHN)	9
Birgul Soltanova (AZE)	7
Adaugo Nwachukwu (USA)	7
Selvi İlyasoğlu (TUR)	3
Amina Capezan (ROU)	0
Veranika Ivanova (UWW)	11

Round of 16
Sakura Motoki (JPN)	2
Nikolett Szabó (HUN)	0^{R}
Lili (CHN)	1
Esther Kolawole (NGR)	3
Johanna Lindborg (SWE)	6
Adaugo Nwachukwu (USA)	13
Veranika Ivanova (UWW)	0
Pürevdorjiin Orkhon (MGL)	10

Quarterfinals
Sakura Motoki (JPN)	10^{F}
Esther Kolawole (NGR)	0
Adaugo Nwachukwu (USA)	2
Pürevdorjiin Orkhon (MGL)	5

Semifinals
Sakura Motoki (JPN)	14
Pürevdorjiin Orkhon (MGL)	1

=== Bottom half ===
Round of 32
Aurora Campagna (ITA)	0
Kim Ok-ju (PRK)	4^{F}
Iryna Bondar (UKR)	4
Astrid Montero (VEN)	6
Tynys Dubek (KAZ)	0
Alicja Nowosad (POL)	12

Round of 16
Bilyana Dudova (BUL)	0
Kim Ok-ju (PRK)	8
Astrid Montero (VEN)	1
Manisha Bhanwala (IND)	2
Amina Tandelova (UWW)	10
Alicja Nowosad (POL)	0
Neevis Rodríguez (MEX)	0
Ana Godinez (CAN)	8^{F}

Quarterfinals
Kim Ok-ju (PRK)	8
Manisha Bhanwala (IND)	0
Amina Tandelova (UWW)	4^{F}
Ana Godinez (CAN)	0

Semifinals
Kim Ok-ju (PRK)	14
Amina Tandelova (UWW)	3

=== Repechage ===
Repechage round 1
Aurora Campagna (ITA)	0
Bilyana Dudova (BUL)	3

Repechage round 2
Nikolett Szabó (HUN)
Esther Kolawole (NGR)	WO
Bilyana Dudova (BUL)	9
Manisha Bhanwala (IND)	0

Bronze medals
Esther Kolawole (NGR)	5
Pürevdorjiin Orkhon (MGL)	6
Bilyana Dudova (BUL)	2
Amina Tandelova (UWW)	4

== Final standing ==
Rank	Athlete
1st place, gold medalist(s)	Sakura Motoki (JPN)
2nd place, silver medalist(s)	Kim Ok-ju (PRK)
3rd place, bronze medalist(s)	Pürevdorjiin Orkhon (MGL)
3rd place, bronze medalist(s)	Amina Tandelova (UWW)
5	Esther Kolawole (NGR)
5	Bilyana Dudova (BUL)
7	Adaugo Nwachukwu (USA)
8	Ana Godinez (CAN)
9	Alicja Nowosad (POL)
10	Veranika Ivanova (UWW)
11	Lili (CHN)
12	Astrid Montero (VEN)
13	Manisha Bhanwala (IND)
14	Birgul Soltanova (AZE)
15	Johanna Lindborg (SWE)
16	Iryna Bondar (UKR)
17	Selvi İlyasoğlu (TUR)
18	Nikolett Szabó (HUN)
19	Aurora Campagna (ITA)
20	Neevis Rodríguez (MEX)
21	Amina Capezan (ROU)
22	Tynys Dubek (KAZ)
