= Wrestling at the 2008 Summer Olympics – Women's freestyle 55 kg =

Women's freestyle 55 kg at the Games of the XXIX Olympiad
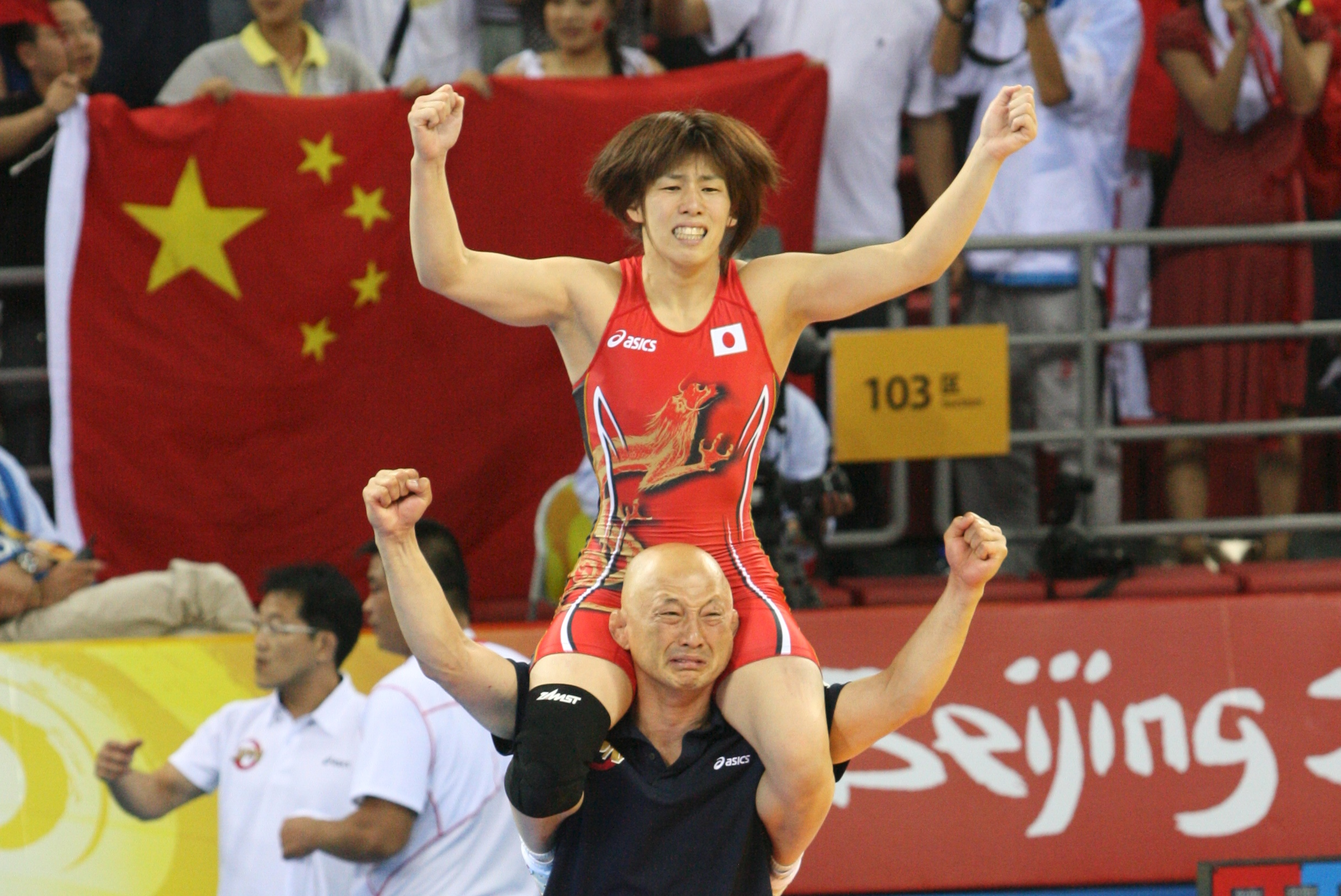
- Saori Yoshida
- Venue: China Agricultural University Gymnasium
- Date: 16 August 2008
- Competitors: 16 from 16 nations

Medalists
1st place, gold medalist(s)		Saori Yoshida	Japan
2nd place, silver medalist(s)		Xu Li	China
3rd place, bronze medalist(s)		Tonya Verbeek	Canada
3rd place, bronze medalist(s)		Jackeline Rentería	Colombia

Women's freestyle 55 kilograms competition at the 2008 Summer Olympics in Beijing, China, was held on August 16 at the China Agricultural University Gymnasium.

This freestyle wrestling competition consisted of a single-elimination tournament, with a repechage used to determine the winner of two bronze medals. The two finalists faced off for gold and silver medals. Each wrestler who lost to one of the two finalists moved into the repechage, culminating in a pair of bronze medal matches featuring the semifinal losers each facing the remaining repechage opponent from their half of the bracket.

Each bout consisted of up to three rounds, lasting two minutes apiece. The wrestler who scored more points in each round was the winner of that rounds; the bout finished when one wrestler had won two rounds (and thus the match).

Saori Yoshida of Japan won the gold medal, her second successive Olympic gold medal in the event after 2004. She defeated China's Xu Li in the final in two periods by fall. The bronze medals went to Canada's Tonya Verbeek, the Athens silver winner, and Colombia's Jackeline Rentería.

== Schedule ==
All times are China Standard Time (UTC+08:00)

Date	Time	Event
16 August 2008	09:30	Qualification rounds
16 August 2008	16:00	Repechage
16 August 2008	16:30	Finals

== Results ==
Legend

- F — Won by fall

=== Main bracket ===
1/8 finals
Naidangiin Otgonjargal (MGL)	0	0
Tonya Verbeek (CAN)	3	4
Ludmila Cristea (MDA)	0	3	3
Marcia Andrades (VEN)	1	3	3
Ida-Theres Nerell (SWE)	1	0
Saori Yoshida (JPN)	3	4
Yelena Komarova (AZE)	0	0
Natalia Golts (RUS)	4	1
Xu Li (CHN)	5	3
Ana Maria Pavăl (ROU)	0	0
Olga Smirnova (KAZ)	2	3	4
Alena Filipava (BLR)	3	0	2
Nataliya Synyshyn (UKR)	4	1	0
Marcie Van Dusen (USA)	0	1	7
Jackeline Rentería (COL)	7	4^{F}
Marwa Amri (TUN)	4	0

Quarterfinals
Tonya Verbeek (CAN)	3	3
Ludmila Cristea (MDA)	1	0
Saori Yoshida (JPN)	2	4
Natalia Golts (RUS)	1	0
Xu Li (CHN)	0	2	2
Olga Smirnova (KAZ)	1	0	1
Marcie Van Dusen (USA)	2	3
Jackeline Rentería (COL)	7	5

Semifinals
Tonya Verbeek (CAN)	0	0
Saori Yoshida (JPN)	2	6
Xu Li (CHN)	5	4^{F}
Jackeline Rentería (COL)	5	0

Final
Saori Yoshida (JPN)	2	5^{F}
Xu Li (CHN)	0	0

=== Repechage ===
Repechage round 1
Ida-Theres Nerell (SWE)	1	0	1
Natalia Golts (RUS)	0	3	0
Ana Maria Pavăl (ROU)	5	1	3
Olga Smirnova (KAZ)	3	1	0

Bronze medals
Ida-Theres Nerell (SWE)	0	0
Tonya Verbeek (CAN)	1	1
Ana Maria Pavăl (ROU)	1
Jackeline Rentería (COL)	3^{F}

== Final standing ==
Rank	Athlete
1st place, gold medalist(s)	Saori Yoshida (JPN)
2nd place, silver medalist(s)	Xu Li (CHN)
3rd place, bronze medalist(s)	Tonya Verbeek (CAN)
3rd place, bronze medalist(s)	Jackeline Rentería (COL)
5	Ida-Theres Nerell (SWE)
5	Ana Maria Pavăl (ROU)
7	Olga Smirnova (KAZ)
8	Natalia Golts (RUS)
9	Marcie Van Dusen (USA)
10	Ludmila Cristea (MDA)
11	Marcia Andrades (VEN)
12	Nataliya Synyshyn (UKR)
13	Alena Filipava (BLR)
14	Marwa Amri (TUN)
15	Yelena Komarova (AZE)
16	Naidangiin Otgonjargal (MGL)
