= 2026 European Wrestling Championships – Women's freestyle 65 kg =

Wrestling competition held in Tirana, Albania

Women's freestyle 65 kg at the 2026 European Wrestling Championships
- Venue: Tirana Olympic Park
- Location: Tirana, Albania
- Dates: 23–24 April
- Competitors: 10 from 9 nations

Medalists
gold medal	Iryna Koliadenko	Ukraine
silver medal	Alina Kasabieva
bronze medal	Beyza Nur Akkuş	Turkey
bronze medal	Natalia Kubaty	Poland

The women's freestyle 65 kilograms competition at the 2026 European Wrestling Championships was held from 23 to 24 April 2026 at the Tirana Olympic Park in Tirana, Albania.

== Results ==
Legend

- F — Won by fall

=== Main bracket ===
Round of 16
Elma Zeidlere (LAT)	0
Beyza Nur Akkuş (TUR)	3
Nina Bodișteanu (MDA)	2
Iris Thiébaux (FRA)	9

Quarterfinals
Alina Kasabieva (UWW)	12
Beyza Nur Akkuş (TUR)	9
Birgul Soltanova (AZE)	3
Kriszta Incze (ROU)	1
Natalia Kubaty (POL)	4
Agnes Nygren (SWE)	4
Iris Thiébaux (FRA)	0
Iryna Koliadenko (UKR)	10

Semifinals
Alina Kasabieva (UWW)	11
Birgul Soltanova (AZE)	10
Natalia Kubaty (POL)	0
Iryna Koliadenko (UKR)	11

Final
Alina Kasabieva (UWW)	0
Iryna Koliadenko (UKR)	9

=== Repechage ===
Bronze medal matches
Beyza Nur Akkuş (TUR)	4
Birgul Soltanova (AZE)	2
Iris Thiébaux (FRA)	6
Natalia Kubaty (POL)	11

== Final standing ==
Rank	Wrestler
1st place, gold medalist(s)	Iryna Koliadenko (UKR)
2nd place, silver medalist(s)	Alina Kasabieva (UWW)
3rd place, bronze medalist(s)	Beyza Nur Akkuş (TUR)
3rd place, bronze medalist(s)	Natalia Kubaty (POL)
5	Birgul Soltanova (AZE)
5	Iris Thiébaux (FRA)
7	Agnes Nygren (SWE)
8	Nina Bodișteanu (MDA)
9	Kriszta Incze (ROU)
10	Elma Zeidlere (LAT)
