= 2025 European Wrestling Championships – Women's freestyle 65 kg =

Wrestling competition

Women's freestyle 65 kg at the 2025 European Wrestling Championships
- Venue: X-Bionic Sphere
- Location: Bratislava, Slovakia
- Dates: 10-11 April
- Competitors: 12

Medalists
gold medal	Grace Bullen	Norway
silver medal	Irina Rîngaci	Moldova
bronze medal	Dinara Kudaeva
bronze medal	Iryna Koliadenko	Ukraine

The women's freestyle 65 kg is a competition featured at the 2025 European Wrestling Championships, and was held in Bratislava, Slovakia on April 10 and 11.

== Results ==
Legend

- F — Won by fall
- R — Retired

=== Main bracket ===
Round of 16
Olha Padoshyk (POL)	3^{F}
Viktória Földešiová (SVK)	0
Marta Ojeda (ESP)	0
Grace Bullen (NOR)	10
Anne Nürnberger (GER)	4
Beyza Nur Akkuş (TUR)	14
Krystsina Sazykina (UWW)	2
Enikő Elekes (HUN)	8

Quarterfinals
Elma Zeidlere (LAT)	0
Olha Padoshyk (POL)	3
Grace Bullen (NOR)	11^{F}
Dinara Kudaeva (UWW)	0
Iryna Koliadenko (UKR)	10
Beyza Nur Akkuş (TUR)	3^{R}
Enikő Elekes (HUN)	2
Irina Rîngaci (MDA)	2^{F}

Semifinals
Olha Padoshyk (POL)	0
Grace Bullen (NOR)	6^{F}
Iryna Koliadenko (UKR)	0
Irina Rîngaci (MDA)	11

Final
Grace Bullen (NOR)	11
Irina Rîngaci (MDA)	8

=== Repechage ===
Repechage round 1
Marta Ojeda (ESP)	0
Dinara Kudaeva (UWW)	10^{F}

Bronze medal match
Dinara Kudaeva (UWW)	5
Olha Padoshyk (POL)	0
Enikő Elekes (HUN)	4
Iryna Koliadenko (UKR)	6^{F}

== Final standing ==
Rank	Athlete
1st place, gold medalist(s)	Grace Bullen (NOR)
2nd place, silver medalist(s)	Irina Rîngaci (MDA)
3rd place, bronze medalist(s)	Dinara Kudaeva (UWW)
3rd place, bronze medalist(s)	Iryna Koliadenko (UKR)
5	Olha Padoshyk (POL)
5	Enikő Elekes (HUN)
7	Beyza Nur Akkuş (TUR)
8	Anne Nürnberger (GER)
9	Krystsina Sazykina (UWW)
10	Elma Zeidlere (LAT)
11	Viktória Földešiová (SVK)
12	Marta Ojeda (ESP)
