= 2025 U23 World Wrestling Championships – Women's freestyle 62 kg =

Wrestling competitions

Women's freestyle 62 kg at the 2025 U23 World Championships
- Venue: SPC Vojvodina
- Dates: 24–25 October
- Competitors: 23 from 21 nations

Medalists
gold medal	Sakura Motoki	Japan
silver medal	Iryna Bondar	Ukraine
bronze medal	Esther Kolawole	Nigeria
bronze medal	Yana Tretsiak

The women's freestyle 62 kilograms is a competition featured at the 2025 U23 World Wrestling Championships, and was held in Novi Sad, Serbia on 24 and 25 October 2025.

This freestyle wrestling competition consists of a single-elimination tournament, with a repechage used to determine the winner of two bronze medals. The two finalists face off for gold and silver medals. Each wrestler who loses to one of the two finalists moves into the repechage, culminating in a pair of bronze medal matches featuring the semifinal losers each facing the remaining repechage opponent from their half of the bracket.

== Results ==
Legend

- F — Won by fall

=== Final ===
Final
Iryna Bondar (UKR)	0
Sakura Motoki (JPN)	10

=== Top half ===
Round of 32
Iryna Bondar (UKR)	12^{F}
Selvi İlyasoğlu (TUR)	5
Alicja Nowosad (POL)	3
Astrid Montero (VEN)	5
Ekaterina Koshkina (UWW)	19^{F}
Birgul Soltanova (AZE)	8

Round of 16
Yasmine Soliman (HUN)	0
Esther Kolawole (NGR)	10
Iryna Bondar (UKR)	4
Savita Dalal (IND)	3
Yang Huan (CHN)	3
Astrid Montero (VEN)	8
Ekaterina Koshkina (UWW)	2
Adaugo Nwachukwu (USA)	13^{F}

Quarterfinals
Esther Kolawole (NGR)	3
Iryna Bondar (UKR)	4
Astrid Montero (VEN)	7
Adaugo Nwachukwu (USA)	5

Semifinals
Iryna Bondar (UKR)	8
Astrid Montero (VEN)	5

=== Bottom half ===
Round of 32
Iris Thiébaux (FRA)	0
Luisa Scheel (GER)	5^{F}
Agnes Nygren (SWE)	8
Lana Nogić (CRO)	0
Sakura Motoki (JPN)	6^{F}
Nigina Sabirova (UZB)	0
Annika Fines (CAN)	11
Tynys Dubek (KAZ)	1

Round of 16
Immacolata Danise (ITA)	4^{F}
Luisa Scheel (GER)	4
Agnes Nygren (SWE)	2^{F}
Gabriela Rudoi (MDA)	0
Sara Šarić (SRB)	0
Sakura Motoki (JPN)	2^{F}
Annika Fines (CAN)	1
Yana Tretsiak (UWW)	2

Quarterfinals
Immacolata Danise (ITA)	7
Agnes Nygren (SWE)	3
Sakura Motoki (JPN)	2^{F}
Yana Tretsiak (UWW)	0

Semifinals
Immacolata Danise (ITA)	0
Sakura Motoki (JPN)	8^{F}

=== Repechage ===
Repechage round 1
Selvi İlyasoğlu (TUR)	2
Savita Dalal (IND)	12^{F}
Nigina Sabirova (UZB)	4^{F}
Sara Šarić (SRB)	0

Repechage round 2
Savita Dalal (IND)	4
Esther Kolawole (NGR)	16
Nigina Sabirova (UZB)	1
Yana Tretsiak (UWW)	2

Bronze medals
Esther Kolawole (NGR)	8
Astrid Montero (VEN)	1
Yana Tretsiak (UWW)	9
Immacolata Danise (ITA)	4

== Final standing ==
Rank	Athlete
1st place, gold medalist(s)	Sakura Motoki (JPN)
2nd place, silver medalist(s)	Iryna Bondar (UKR)
3rd place, bronze medalist(s)	Esther Kolawole (NGR)
3rd place, bronze medalist(s)	Yana Tretsiak (UWW)
5	Astrid Montero (VEN)
5	Immacolata Danise (ITA)
7	Agnes Nygren (SWE)
8	Savita Dalal (IND)
9	Adaugo Nwachukwu (USA)
10	Nigina Sabirova (UZB)
11	Ekaterina Koshkina (UWW)
12	Luisa Scheel (GER)
13	Annika Fines (CAN)
14	Alicja Nowosad (POL)
15	Yang Huan (CHN)
16	Tynys Dubek (KAZ)
17	Birgul Soltanova (AZE)
18	Selvi İlyasoğlu (TUR)
19	Gabriela Rudoi (MDA)
20	Iris Thiébaux (FRA)
21	Sara Šarić (SRB)
22	Lana Nogić (CRO)
23	Yasmine Soliman (HUN)
