= Yessica Oviedo =

Dominican Republic freestyle wrestler

Personal information
- Full name: Yessica Coraima Oviedo Pérez
- Born: 2 January 1993 (age 33)

Sport
- Country: Dominican Republic
- Sport: Amateur wrestling
- Event: Freestyle
Medal record
Women's freestyle wrestling
Representing Dominican Republic
Pan American Championships
Silver medal – second place	2013 Panama City	55 kg
Silver medal – second place	2017 Lauro de Freitas	58 kg
Silver medal – second place	2021 Guatemala City	68 kg
Bronze medal – third place	2022 Acapulco	68 kg
Central American and Caribbean Games
Bronze medal – third place	2018 Barranquilla	57 kg
Bolivarian Games
Gold medal – first place	2017 Santa Marta	58 kg
Bronze medal – third place	2013 Trujillo	55 kg
Bronze medal – third place	2022 Valledupar	68 kg

Yessica Coraima Oviedo Pérez (born 2 January 1993) is a Dominican Republic freestyle wrestler. She is a four-time medalist at the Pan American Wrestling Championships, a three-time medalist (including gold) at the Bolivarian Games and a bronze medalist at the Central American and Caribbean Games.

== Career ==
Oviedo won the silver medal in the women's 55 kg event at the 2013 Pan American Wrestling Championships held in Panama City, Panama. She won one of the bronze medals in her event at the 2013 Bolivarian Games held in Trujillo, Peru.

In 2017, Oviedo won the silver medal in the women's 58 kg event at the Pan American Wrestling Championships held in Lauro de Freitas, Brazil. She competed in the women's 58 kg event at the World Wrestling Championships in Paris, France. She won the gold medal in her event at the 2017 Bolivarian Games held in Santa Marta, Colombia.

Oviedo lost her bronze medal match in the women's 57 kg event at the 2018 Pan American Wrestling Championships held in Lima, Peru. She won the bronze medal in her event at the 2018 Central American and Caribbean Games held in Barranquilla, Colombia.

In 2020, Oviedo competed at the Pan American Olympic Qualification Tournament without qualifying for the 2020 Summer Olympics in Tokyo, Japan. She also failed to qualify for the Olympics at the 2021 World Olympic Qualification Tournament held in Sofia, Bulgaria.

Oviedo won the silver medal in the women's 68 kg event at the 2021 Pan American Wrestling Championships held in Guatemala City, Guatemala.

She won one of the bronze medals in the women's 68 kg event at the 2022 Pan American Wrestling Championships held in Acapulco, Mexico. She won the bronze medal in her event at the 2022 Bolivarian Games held in Valledupar, Colombia.

== Achievements ==
Year	Tournament	Location	Result	Event
2013	Pan American Wrestling Championships	Panama City, Panama	2nd	Freestyle 55 kg
2013	Bolivarian Games	Trujillo, Peru	3rd	Freestyle 55 kg
2017	Pan American Wrestling Championships	Lauro de Freitas, Brazil	2nd	Freestyle 58 kg
2017	Bolivarian Games	Santa Marta, Colombia	1st	Freestyle 58 kg
2018	Central American and Caribbean Games	Barranquilla, Colombia	3rd	Freestyle 57 kg
2021	Pan American Wrestling Championships	Guatemala City, Guatemala	2nd	Freestyle 68 kg
2022	Pan American Wrestling Championships	Acapulco, Mexico	3rd	Freestyle 68 kg
2022	Bolivarian Games	Valledupar, Colombia	3rd	Freestyle 68 kg
