= Wrestling at the 2024 Summer Olympics – Women's freestyle 62 kg =

Women's freestyle 62 kg at the Games of the XXXIII Olympiad
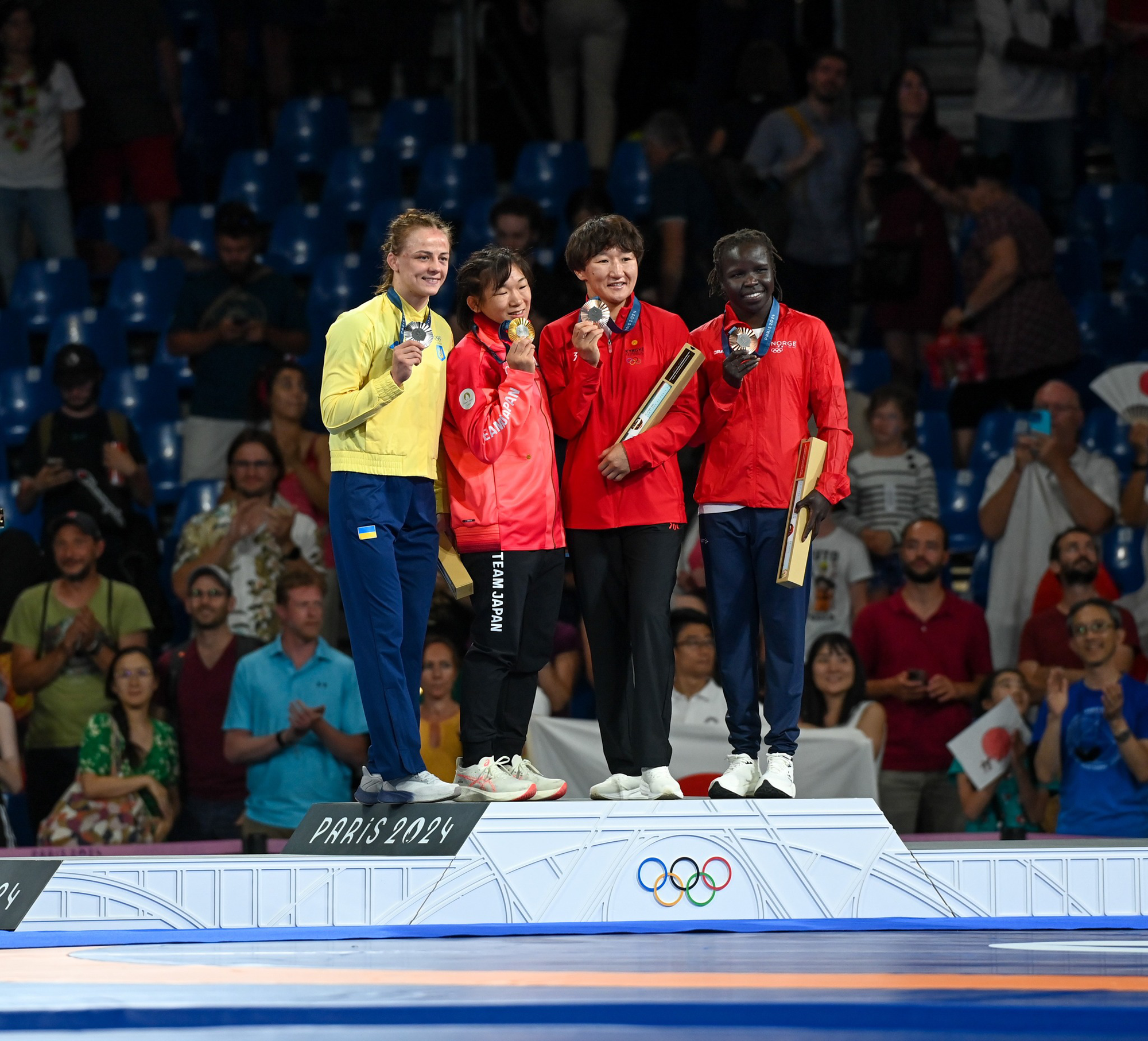
- Venue: Grand Palais Éphémère
- Date: 9–10 August 2024
- Competitors: 16 from 16 nations

Medalists
1st place, gold medalist(s)		Sakura Motoki	Japan
2nd place, silver medalist(s)		Iryna Koliadenko	Ukraine
3rd place, bronze medalist(s)		Aisuluu Tynybekova	Kyrgyzstan
3rd place, bronze medalist(s)		Grace Bullen	Norway

Women's freestyle 62 kilograms competition at the 2024 Summer Olympics in Paris, France, took place on 9–10 August 2024 at the Grand Palais Éphémère in Champ de Mars.

== Background ==
This is the sixth appearance of the women's freestyle middleweight category, debut in 2004 and it has been appeared in every games since then.

- 2004-2016: 63 kg
- 2020-current: 62 kg

Sakura Motoki won the event by defeating returned bronze medalist Iryna Koliadenko in the final, returned silver medalist Aisuluu Tynybekova and Grace Bullen won the bronze medals respectively.

== Format ==
This freestyle wrestling competition consists of a single-elimination tournament, with a repechage used to determine the winner of two bronze medals. The two finalists face off for gold and silver medals. Each wrestler who loses to one of the two finalists moves into the repechage, culminating in a pair of bronze medal matches featuring the semifinal losers each facing the remaining repechage opponent from their half of the bracket.

== Rules ==
A typical bout consists of two halves of three minutes each separated by a 30-second break. The two competitors compete on a mat, which is nine meters in diameter. Wrestlers try to score points by executing various legal maneuvers. Points ranging from one to five are awarded by the mat referee depending on the degree of difficulty of the maneuvers. Points are also awarded to the opponent in case of infractions such as illegal holds, passivity etc. A wrestler is automatically disqualified if three cautions are awarded during a bout. Forcing an opponent's shoulders to the mat results in an instant victory by fall.

During the course of a match, if a wrestler builds a 10-point advantage over the opponent, the bout is stopped and the leader is declared as the winner by technical superiority. The total scores are totaled at the end of the stipulated six-minute period, and the wrestler with the maximum points wins. In case of a tie, the wrestler who has scored the last point is declared the winner. A competitor might also be declared a winner if the opponent does not turn up or is medically unfit to compete.

== Qualification ==
Sixteen quota places were available with each nation restricted to a maximum of one spot. Five quota places were awarded at the 2023 World Wrestling Championships, which took place from the 16 to 24 September in Belgrade, Serbia. The finalists of each category in the four continental qualification tournaments (Asia, Europe, the Americas, and the joint Africa & Oceania) were awarded quota places. The remainder of the total quota was allocated at the 2024 World Wrestling Olympic Qualification Tournament, offering a minimum of three quota places.

== Schedule ==
All times are Central European Time (UTC+02:00)

Date	Time	Event
9 August 2024	11:00	Qualification rounds
9 August 2024	18:15	Semifinals
10 August 2024	11:00	Repechage
10 August 2024	19:30	Finals

== Results ==
Sixteen athletes qualified for the competition.

Legend

- F — Won by fall

=== Main bracket ===
Round of 16
Aisuluu Tynybekova (KGZ)	5
Esther Kolawole (NGR)	1
Nesrin Baş (TUR)	2
Kayla Miracle (USA)	12
Bilyana Dudova (BUL)	8
Johanna Lindborg (SWE)	3
Pürevdorjiin Orkhon (MGL)	7
Iryna Koliadenko (UKR)	8
Grace Bullen (NOR)	12
Siwar Bousetta (TUN)	2
Lee Han-bit (KOR)	0
Luisa Niemesch (GER)	3
Ana Godinez (CAN)	5
Améline Douarre (FRA)	2
Kriszta Incze (ROU)	0
Sakura Motoki (JPN)	4^{F}

Quarterfinals
Aisuluu Tynybekova (KGZ)	6
Kayla Miracle (USA)	6
Bilyana Dudova (BUL)	3
Iryna Koliadenko (UKR)	7
Grace Bullen (NOR)	10
Luisa Niemesch (GER)	0
Ana Godinez (CAN)	0
Sakura Motoki (JPN)	11

Semifinals
Aisuluu Tynybekova (KGZ)	2
Iryna Koliadenko (UKR)	9
Grace Bullen (NOR)	7
Sakura Motoki (JPN)	7^{F}

Final
Iryna Koliadenko (UKR)	1
Sakura Motoki (JPN)	12

=== Repechage ===
Repechage
Pürevdorjiin Orkhon (MGL)	3
Bilyana Dudova (BUL)	1
Kriszta Incze (ROU)	0
Ana Godinez (CAN)	2

Bronze medal matches
Pürevdorjiin Orkhon (MGL)	6
Aisuluu Tynybekova (KGZ)	6
Ana Godinez (CAN)	0
Grace Bullen (NOR)	11

== Final standing ==
Rank	Athlete
1st place, gold medalist(s)	Sakura Motoki (JPN)
2nd place, silver medalist(s)	Iryna Koliadenko (UKR)
3rd place, bronze medalist(s)	Aisuluu Tynybekova (KGZ)
3rd place, bronze medalist(s)	Grace Bullen (NOR)
5	Ana Godinez (CAN)
5	Pürevdorjiin Orkhon (MGL)
7	Kayla Miracle (USA)
8	Bilyana Dudova (BUL)
9	Luisa Niemesch (GER)
10	Johanna Lindborg (SWE)
11	Améline Douarre (FRA)
12	Nesrin Baş (TUR)
13	Siwar Bousetta (TUN)
14	Esther Kolawole (NGR)
15	Lee Han-bit (KOR)
16	Kriszta Incze (ROU)
