= Iryna Koliadenko =

Ukrainian wrestler (born 1998)

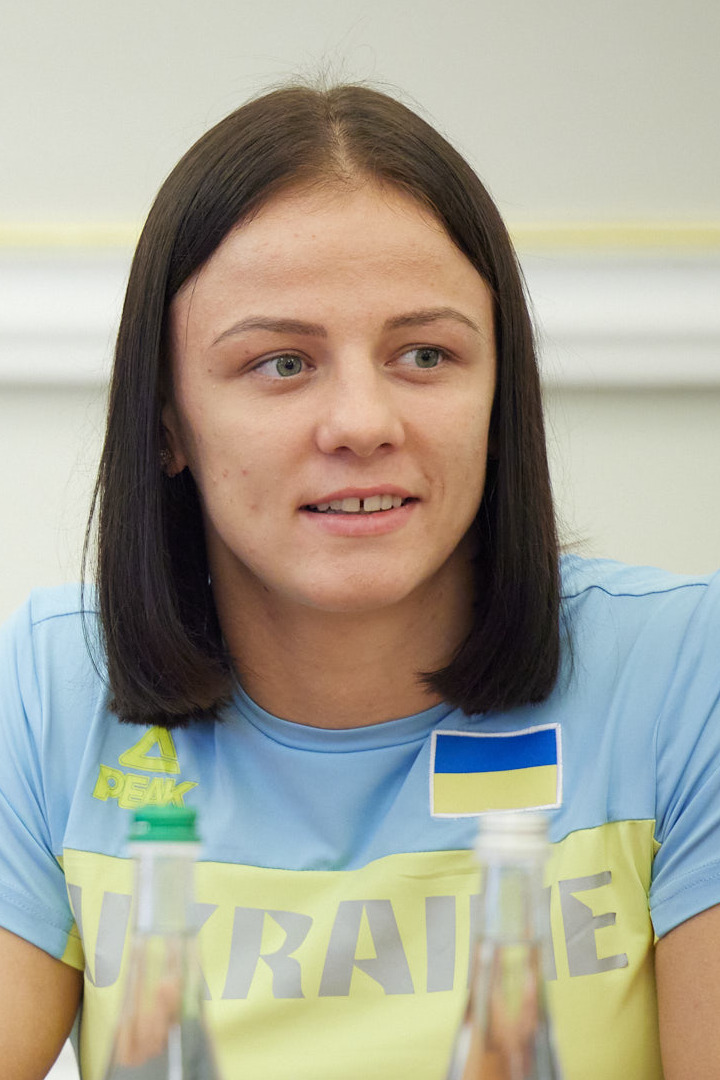
- Koliadenko in 2021

Personal information
- Native name: Ірина Коляденко
- Born: 28 August 1998 (age 27) Radomyshl, Zhytomyr Oblast, Ukraine

Sport
- Country: Ukraine
- Sport: Amateur wrestling
- Weight class: 62 kg; 65 kg
- Event: Freestyle
Medal record
Women's freestyle wrestling
Representing Ukraine
Olympic Games
Silver medal – second place	2024 Paris	62 kg
Bronze medal – third place	2020 Tokyo	62 kg
World Championships
Silver medal – second place	2019 Nur-Sultan	65 kg
Bronze medal – third place	2023 Belgrade	62 kg
European Championships
Gold medal – first place	2021 Warsaw	62 kg
Gold medal – first place	2023 Zagreb	62 kg
Gold medal – first place	2024 Bucharest	65 kg
Gold medal – first place	2026 Tirana	65 kg
Bronze medal – third place	2020 Rome	65 kg
Bronze medal – third place	2025 Bratislava	65 kg
Grand Prix
Bronze medal – third place	2025 Tirana	65 kg
World U23 Championships
Bronze medal – third place	2018 Bucharest	65 kg
Bronze medal – third place	2019 Budapest	65 kg

Iryna Volodymyrivna Koliadenko (Ukrainian: Ірина Володимирівна Коляденко, born 28 August 1998) is a Ukrainian freestyle wrestler. She is a two-time Olympic medallist and won the silver medal in the women's freestyle 62 kg event at the 2024 Summer Olympics and one of the bronze medals in the women's freestyle 62 kg event at the 2020 Summer Olympics. Koliadenko is also a World Championships silver and bronze medallist, and a four-time European champion.

== Career ==
In 2018 and 2019, Koliadenko won the bronze medal in the women's freestyle 65 kg event both at the 2018 World U23 Wrestling Championship and 2019 World U23 Wrestling Championship, held in Bucharest, Romania and Budapest, Hungary, respectively. She won the silver medal in the women's freestyle 65 kg event at the 2019 World Championships.

In 2020, Koliadenko won one of the bronze medals in the 65 kg event at the European Wrestling Championships held in Rome, Italy. In her bronze medal match she defeated Kriszta Incze of Romania. In March 2021, she qualified at the European Qualification Tournament to compete at the 2020 Summer Olympics in Tokyo, Japan. A month later, Koliadenko won the gold medal in the 62 kg event at the 2021 European Wrestling Championships held in Warsaw, Poland. She defeated Marianna Sastin of Hungary in the final.

Koliadenko won one of the bronze medals in the women's freestyle 62 kg event at the 2020 Summer Olympics held in Tokyo, Japan. She defeated Anastasija Grigorjeva of Latvia in her bronze medal match.

In 2022, Koliadenko won the gold medal in her event at the Matteo Pellicone Ranking Series 2022 held in Rome, Italy. She won one of the bronze medals in her event at the 2023 Ibrahim Moustafa Tournament held in Alexandria, Egypt.

Koliadenko won the gold medal in the 62 kg event at the 2023 European Wrestling Championships held in Zagreb, Croatia. She defeated Grace Bullen of Norway in her gold medal match. Koliadenko won one of the bronze medals in the 62 kg event at the 2023 World Wrestling Championships held in Belgrade, Serbia. As a result, she earned a quota place for Ukraine for the 2024 Summer Olympics in Paris, France.

Koliadenko won the gold medal in the 65 kg event at the 2024 European Wrestling Championships held in Bucharest, Romania. She defeated Kateryna Zelenykh of Romania in her gold medal match.

Koliadenko won the silver medal in the women's 62 kg event at the 2024 Summer Olympics in Paris, France. She lost against Sakura Motoki of Japan in the final.

== Achievements ==
Year	Tournament	Location	Result	Event
2019	World Championships	Nur-Sultan, Kazakhstan	2nd	Freestyle 65 kg
2020	European Championships	Rome, Italy	3rd	Freestyle 65 kg
2021	European Championships	Warsaw, Poland	1st	Freestyle 62 kg
2021	Summer Olympics	Tokyo, Japan	3rd	Freestyle 62 kg
2023	European Championships	Zagreb, Croatia	1st	Freestyle 62 kg
2023	World Championships	Belgrade, Serbia	3rd	Freestyle 62 kg
2024	European Championships	Bucharest, Romania	1st	Freestyle 65 kg
2024	Summer Olympics	Paris, France	2nd	Freestyle 62 kg
2025	European Championships	Bratislava, Slovakia	3rd	Freestyle 65 kg
