= Aisuluu Tynybekova =

Kyrgyz freestyle wrestler

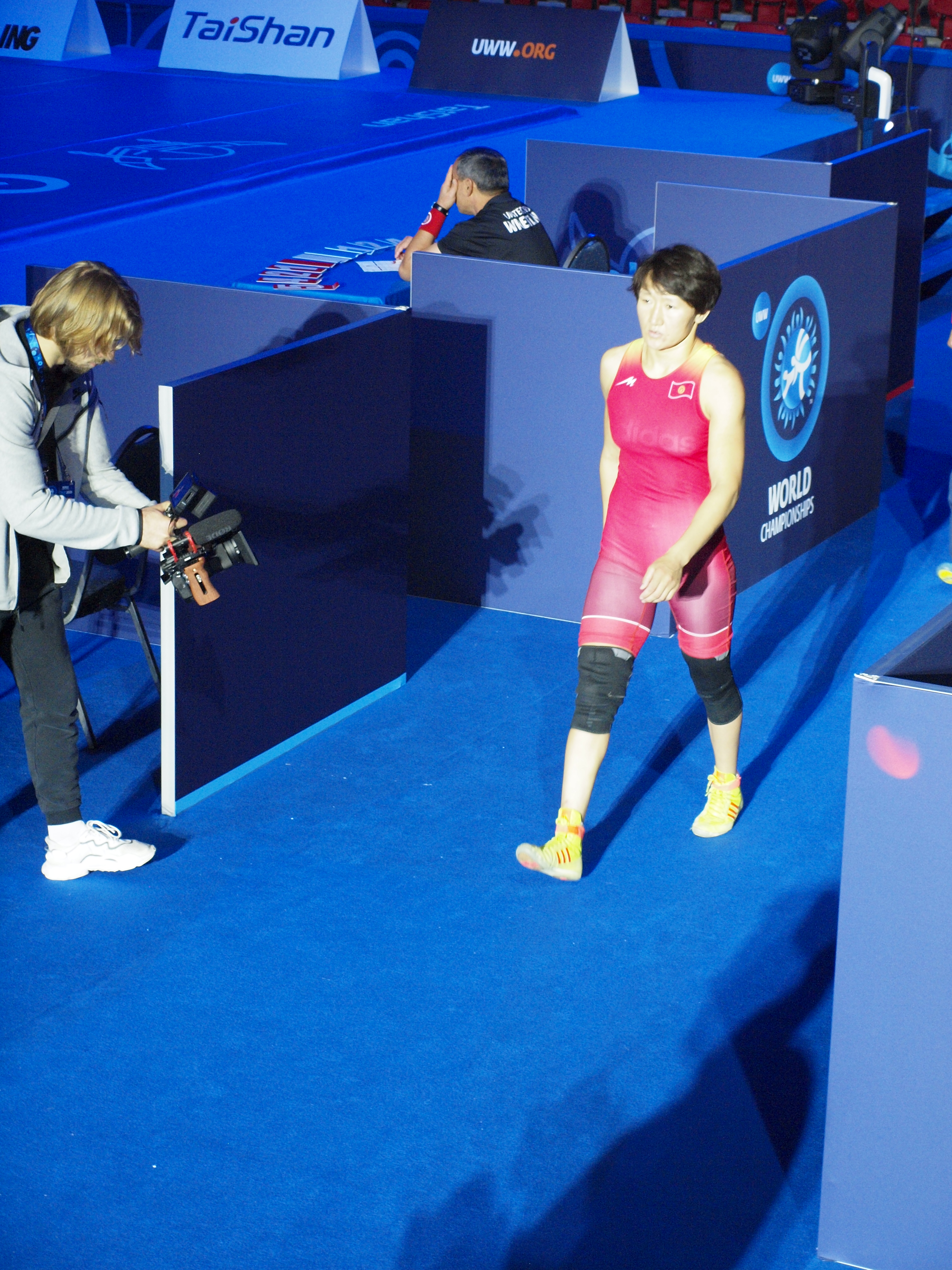
- Tynybekova in 2021

Personal information
- Full name: Aisuluu Tynybekova
- Nationality: Kyrgyzstan
- Born: 4 May 1993 (age 33) Bishkek, Kyrgyzstan
- Occupation: Athlete
- Height: 170 cm (5 ft 7 in)

Sport
- Country: Kyrgyzstan
- Sport: Wrestling
- Weight class: 62 kg
- Event: Freestyle
- Club: Izabekov's Wrestling Academy
- Coached by: Nurbek Izabekov
Medal record
Event	1st	2nd	3rd
Olympic Games	0	1	1
World Championships	3	0	1
Asian Championships	6	3	2
Asian Games	1	0	2
Islamic Solidarity Games	2	0	0
Yasar Dogu Tournament	2	1	0
Golden Grand Prix Ivan Yarygin	1	1	0
Other	12	7	8
Total	27	13	14
Women's freestyle wrestling
Representing Kyrgyzstan
Olympic Games
Silver medal – second place	2020 Tokyo	62 kg
Bronze medal – third place	2024 Paris	62 kg
World Championships
Gold medal – first place	2019 Nur-Sultan	62 kg
Gold medal – first place	2021 Oslo	62 kg
Gold medal – first place	2023 Belgrade	62 kg
Bronze medal – third place	2017 Paris	58 kg
Asian Championships
Gold medal – first place	2016 Bangkok	58 kg
Gold medal – first place	2017 New Delhi	58 kg
Gold medal – first place	2019 Xi'an	62 kg
Gold medal – first place	2021 Almaty	62 kg
Gold medal – first place	2023 Astana	62 kg
Gold medal – first place	2024 Bishkek	62 kg
Silver medal – second place	2014 Astana	60 kg
Silver medal – second place	2015 Doha	58 kg
Silver medal – second place	2022 Ulaanbaatar	62 kg
Bronze medal – third place	2013 New Delhi	59 kg
Bronze medal – third place	2020 New Delhi	62 kg
Individual World Cup
Gold medal – first place	2020 Belgrade	62 kg
Asian Games
Gold medal – first place	2018 Jakarta	62 kg
Bronze medal – third place	2014 Incheon	55 kg
Bronze medal – third place	2022 Hangzhou	62 kg
Summer Universiade
Bronze medal – third place	2013 Kazan	59 kg
Islamic Solidarity Games
Gold medal – first place	2017 Baku	58 kg
Gold medal – first place	2021 Konya	62 kg
Asian Indoor and Martial Arts Championships
Silver medal – second place	2017 Ashgabat	58 kg
Yasar Dogu Tournament
Gold medal – first place	2020 Istanbul	62 kg
Gold medal – first place	2024 Antalya	62 kg
Silver medal – second place	2018 Istanbul	62 kg
Golden Grand Prix Ivan Yarygin
Gold medal – first place	2017 Krasnoyarsk	58 kg
Silver medal – second place	2015 Krasnoyarsk	58 kg
Dan Kolov - Nikola Petrov Tournament
Bronze medal – third place	2019 Ruse	62 kg
Golden Grand Prix
Silver medal – second place	2015 Baku	58 kg
Bronze medal – third place	2014 Paris	58 kg
Grand Prix
Gold medal – first place	2014 New York	58 kg
Gold medal – first place	2018 Madrid	59 kg
Gold medal – first place	2019 Nice	62 kg
Gold medal – first place	2020 Rome	62 kg
Gold medal – first place	2020 Warsaw	62 kg
Gold medal – first place	2021 Warsaw	62 kg
Gold medal – first place	2021 Kyiv	62 kg
Gold medal – first place	2023 Alexandria	62 kg
Gold medal – first place	2023 Budapest	62 kg
Gold medal – first place	2024 Zagreb	62 kg
Silver medal – second place	2014 Dormagen	58 kg
Silver medal – second place	2015 Madrid	58 kg
Silver medal – second place	2016 Spala	58 kg
Silver medal – second place	2017 Varşova	58 kg
Silver medal – second place	2017 Klippan	58 kg
Bronze medal – third place	2012 Madrid	63 kg
Bronze medal – third place	2013 Klippan	59 kg
Bronze medal – third place	2018 Wenzhou	59 kg
World Juniors Championships
Bronze medal – third place	2013 Sofia	59 kg
Asian Juniors Championships
Gold medal – first place	2013 Phuket	59 kg
Asian Cadets Championships
Bronze medal – third place	2010 Bangkok	56 kg

Aisuluu Tynybekova (Kyrgyz: Айсулуу Тыныбекова, born 4 May 1993 in Bishkek) is a Kyrgyz freestyle wrestler. She won the silver medal in the women's 62 kg event at the 2020 Summer Olympics held in Tokyo, Japan. She also competed in the women's 63 kg event at the 2012 Summer Olympics, the first woman to wrestle for Kyrgyzstan in the Olympics. A hooliganism charge against her threatened to prevent Tynybekova from competing in London, but adjudication of the case was delayed until after the Games. Tynybekova was eliminated in the 1/8 finals by Henna Johansson.

As of summer 2016, Tynybekova has competed in four World Championships (her highest finish being seventh in 2013) and four Asian Championships, finishing no lower than third and winning the 58 kg class in 2016.

In the 2016 Summer Olympics, Tynybekova won her octofinal and quarterfinal in the women's freestyle 58 kg event, then lost in the semifinal to the eventual silver medalist, Russia's Valeria Koblova. She then lost the second bronze medal match to Sakshi Malik.

On 13 May 2017, Tynybekova won a gold medal in the Asian championship in 2017 (New Delhi, India). On 23 August 2017, she received a bronze medal at the 2017 World Championships in Paris, France, by defeating Rong Ningning (China) in 58 kg wrestling.

In 2020, she won the gold medal in the 62 kg event at the 2020 Individual Wrestling World Cup held in Belgrade, Serbia.

== Personal life ==
Tynybekova was born on 4 May 1993, in the village of Kochkor in the Naryn oblast in the North part of Kyrgyzstan. At 15, Tynybekova discovered the sport of freestyle wrestling, and four years later she became the first woman to wrestle for Kyrgyzstan in the Olympics.

Prior to her career in wrestling, she played basketball and trained in the martial art karate. In 2009, she joined the Kyrgyz national wrestling team, and as soon as 2013, she was named one of the Best Athletes of the Year in Kyrgyzstan. Additionally, she held the title of Master of Sport of International Class in Kyrgyzstan in 2015. She also studied economics at the Kyrgyz State Technical University in Bishkek.

== Career ==
Aisuluu started her international wrestling career in the year 2009. She went on to become Asian Junior and Cadet champion.

=== 2012 ===
==== 2012 London Olympics ====
In 2012 she became the first-ever female wrestler from Kyrgyzstan to qualify for the Olympics by winning a silver medal at the Asian Olympic qualification tournament in the 63 kg women's freestyle wrestling event. She was eliminated from the tournament by Henna Johansson. Later in the year she went on to win bronze at the Spain Open held in Madrid.

=== 2013 ===
Aisuluu came back stronger from the Olympic loss in the year 2013. She won the bronze medal in the 59 kg category. Later in the year she proceeded to win bronze at Klippan Ladies Open in Sweden. This was followed by her competing in the World Wrestling Championship in Budapest, Hungary. She won against her opponents in the round of 32 and the round of 16 only to be stopped by eventual silver medalist Taybe Yusein. As Yusein reached the finals she got the opportunity to compete for the bronze medal. However, she was eliminated by Tetyana Lavrenchuk in repechage round 2. In this year she was also named as the best female athlete of Kyrgyzstan.

=== 2014 ===
2014 turned out to be an important year for Aisuluu. She started the Year's campaign in the Asian wrestling championship in Astana and won the silver medal there. She, in the tournament, defeated Japanese opponent Haruka Sato. She however, failed to win the gold medal because she lost to Zhang Lan of China in the finals. This was followed by a silver at the Grand Prix of Germany before entering the world championship. There she was eliminated in the round of 16 by Alli Ragan of the US.

==== Asian Games 2014 ====
After losing the opening round to eventual silver medalist, Sündeviin Byambatseren, she proceeded to win the bronze medal in the repechage rounds by defeating Jong In-sun.

=== 2015 ===
Aisuluu continued her strong performance following Asian Games. In 2015 she won a silver medal at the Ivan Yarygin Grand Prix. This was followed by her repeating her silver medal at the Asian Championship in 2015 after losing to 10-time-world champion Kaori Icho in finals. She produced strong performances in Spain and Golden Grand prix by winning silver in each. In the 2015 world championship she was defeated in the first round by eventual silver medalist Petra Olli. As Olli reached finals, Aisuluu got repechage rounds. She won the first round against Michelle Fazzari but lost to Johanna Mattsson in the next round.

=== 2016 ===
Aisuluu had a fiery opening in 2016. She came in her strongest form as she won the gold medal at the 2016 Asian Championship. This was followed by another strong gold at the FILA Asian Olympic Qualification Tournament. She before entering the Olympics won a silver at the Poland Open.

==== 2016 Rio Olympics ====
Aisuluu was a medal prospect for her country at the Rio Games. She defeated Joice Silva in round of 16 and Petra Olli in round of 8 before losing to Valeria Koblova in the semi-final. She got her chance to win bronze medal but lost to Sakshi Malik.

=== 2020 ===
In 2020, she won the gold medal in the women's 62 kg event at the 2020 Individual Wrestling World Cup held in Belgrade, Serbia.

=== 2021 ===
In 2021, she won the gold medal in her event at the 2021 Poland Open held in Warsaw, Poland.

Aisuluu Tynybekova takes silver medal in the women's 62 kg, becoming the first-ever woman from Kyrgyzstan to win a silver medal at the Olympic Games.

=== 2022 ===
In 2022, she competed at the Yasar Dogu Tournament held in Istanbul, Turkey. She won the gold medal in the 62 kg event at the 2021 Islamic Solidarity Games held in Konya, Turkey. She lost her bronze medal match in the 62 kg event at the 2022 World Wrestling Championships held in Belgrade, Serbia.

=== 2023 ===
Tynybekova won the gold medal in her event at the 2023 Ibrahim Moustafa Tournament held in Alexandria, Egypt. In June, Tynybekova lost to Russia's Alina Kasabieva at Poddubny wrestling league 5 held in Vladikavkaz, Russia.

She won one of the bronze medals in the women's 62 kg event at the 2022 Asian Games held in Hangzhou, China.

=== 2024 ===
Tynybekova won one of the bronze medals in the women's 62 kg event at the 2024 Summer Olympics in Paris, France. She defeated Pürevdorjiin Orkhon of Mongolia in her bronze medal match.
