= 2018 World Wrestling Championships – Women's freestyle 57 kg =

Women's wrestling

Women's freestyle 57 kg at the 2018 World Championships
- Venue: László Papp Budapest Sports Arena
- Dates: 24–25 October 2018
- Competitors: 25 from 25 nations

Medalists
gold medal	Rong Ningning	China
silver medal	Bilyana Dudova	Bulgaria
bronze medal	Emese Barka	Hungary
bronze medal	Pooja Dhanda	India

The women's freestyle 57 kilograms is a competition featured at the 2018 World Wrestling Championships, and was held in Budapest, Hungary, on 24 and 25 October.

This freestyle wrestling competition consists of a single-elimination tournament, with a repechage used to determine the winner of two bronze medals. The two finalists face off for gold and silver medals. Each wrestler who loses to one of the two finalists moves into the repechage, culminating in a pair of bronze medal matches featuring the semifinal losers each facing the remaining repechage opponent from their half of the bracket.

== Results ==
Legend

- F — Won by fall

=== Final ===
Final
Bilyana Dudova (BUL)	3
Rong Ningning (CHN)	3

=== Top half ===
Round of 32
Emese Barka (HUN)	5
Mathilde Rivière (FRA)	2
Rckaela Aquino (GUM)	0
Um Ji-eun (KOR)	10
Trần Thị Hà (VIE)	3
Elif Yanık (TUR)	10^{F}

Round of 16
Bilyana Dudova (BUL)	3
Kateryna Zhydachevska (ROU)	0
Alexandria Town (CAN)	10
Sandra Paruszewski (GER)	0
Jowita Wrzesień (POL)	0
Emese Barka (HUN)	10
Um Ji-eun (KOR)	8^{F}
Elif Yanık (TUR)	2

Quarterfinals
Bilyana Dudova (BUL)	10
Alexandria Town (CAN)	0
Emese Barka (HUN)	11
Um Ji-eun (KOR)	4

Semifinals
Bilyana Dudova (BUL)	6
Emese Barka (HUN)	2

=== Bottom half ===
Round of 32
Emma Tissina (KAZ)	2
Giullia Penalber (BRA)	5
Iryna Kurachkina (BLR)	5
Iryna Chykhradze (UKR)	7
Jong In-sun (PRK)	4^{F}
Altansetsegiin Battsetseg (MGL)	1
Katsuki Sakagami (JPN)	6
Odunayo Adekuoroye (NGR)	11^{F}
Olga Khoroshavtseva (RUS)	4
Pooja Dhanda (IND)	10
Helen Maroulis (USA)	2
Alyona Kolesnik (AZE)	4^{F}

Round of 16
Grace Bullen (NOR)	14
Giullia Penalber (BRA)	6
Iryna Chykhradze (UKR)	1
Jong In-sun (PRK)	5
Odunayo Adekuoroye (NGR)	6
Pooja Dhanda (IND)	7
Alyona Kolesnik (AZE)	0
Rong Ningning (CHN)	10

Quarterfinals
Grace Bullen (NOR)	3
Jong In-sun (PRK)	3
Pooja Dhanda (IND)	3
Rong Ningning (CHN)	4^{F}

Semifinals
Grace Bullen (NOR)	2
Rong Ningning (CHN)	12

=== Repechage ===
Repechage round 2
Kateryna Zhydachevska (ROU)	8^{F}
Alexandria Town (CAN)	9
Alyona Kolesnik (AZE)	3
Pooja Dhanda (IND)	8

Bronze medals
Kateryna Zhydachevska (ROU)	0
Emese Barka (HUN)	6
Pooja Dhanda (IND)	10
Grace Bullen (NOR)	7
