= 2013 European Wrestling Championships – Women's freestyle 55 kg =

The women's freestyle 55 kg is a competition featured at the 2013 European Wrestling Championships, and was held at the Tbilisi Sports Palace in Tbilisi, Georgia on 21 March 2013.

== Medalists ==
Gold	Sofia Mattsson; Sweden
Silver	Maria Prevolaraki; Greece
Bronze	Iryna Husyak; Ukraine
Bronze	Emese Barka; Hungary

== Results ==
Legend

- F — Won by fall

=== Main Draw ===
Round of 16
Aurélie Basset (FRA)	1	0
Iryna Husyak (UKR)	2	6
Yarina Dubovska (AZE)	0	0
Katarzyna Krawczyk (POL)	1	1
Maria Prevolaraki (GRE)	1	3
Violeta Atanasova (BUL)	0	0
Laura Mertens (GER)	0	1	1
Lenka Martináková (CZE)	2	0	0
Leyla Metin (TUR)	3	2	1
Emese Barka (HUN)	0	9	7^{F}
Nadezhda Tretyakova (RUS)	0	4	1
Mariana Eșanu (MDA)	1	1	6^{F}
Ana Maria Pavăl (ROU)	0
Sofia Mattsson (SWE)	3^{F}

Quarterfinals
Zalina Sidakova (BLR)	0	0
Iryna Husyak (UKR)	1	5
Katarzyna Krawczyk (POL)	0	1
Maria Prevolaraki (GRE)	1	1
Laura Mertens (GER)	0	0
Emese Barka (HUN)	7	3
Mariana Eșanu (MDA)	0	0
Sofia Mattsson (SWE)	3	3^{F}

Semifinals
Iryna Husyak (UKR)	0	0
Maria Prevolaraki (GRE)	2	1
Emese Barka (HUN)	0	1
Sofia Mattsson (SWE)	4	3

Final
Maria Prevolaraki (GRE)	0	0
Sofia Mattsson (SWE)	2	6

=== Repechage ===
Repechage round 1
Violeta Atanasova (BUL)	0
Katarzyna Krawczyk (POL)	4^{F}
Ana Maria Pavăl (ROU)	4	1
Mariana Eșanu (MDA)	0	1

Bronze medals
Katarzyna Krawczyk (POL)	0	1
Iryna Husyak (UKR)	6	3
Ana Maria Pavăl (ROU)	0	1
Emese Barka (HUN)	1	1
