= Sakura Motoki =

Japanese freestyle wrestler

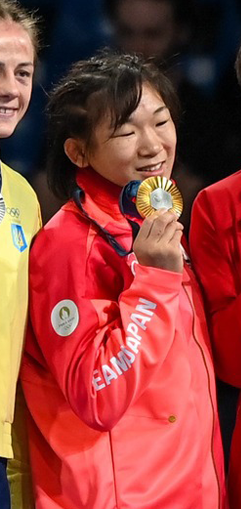
- Motoki at the 2024 Summer Olympics

Personal information
- Native name: 元木咲良
- Born: 20 February 2002 (age 24) Saitama, Japan
- Height: 1.60 m (5 ft 3 in)
- Weight: 62 kg (137 lb)

Sport
- Country: Japan
- Sport: Women's freestyle wrestling
- Event: 62 kg
Medal record
Women's freestyle wrestling
Representing Japan
Olympic Games
Gold medal – first place	2024 Paris	62 kg
World Championships
Gold medal – first place	2025 Zagreb	62 kg
Silver medal – second place	2023 Belgrade	62 kg
Bronze medal – third place	2022 Belgrade	59 kg
Asian Championships
Silver medal – second place	2024 Bishkek	62 kg
Grand Prix
Gold medal – first place	2023 Zagreb	62 kg
U23 World Championships
Gold medal – first place	2025 Novi Sad	62 kg
World Juniors Championships
Gold medal – first place	2022 Sofia	59 kg
World Cadets Championships
Gold medal – first place	2018 Zagreb	46 kg

Sakura Motoki (元木 咲良, Motoki Sakura; born 20 February 2002) is a Japanese freestyle wrestler competing in the 62 kg division. She won the gold medal in the women's 62 kg event at the 2024 Summer Olympics in Paris, France.

== Career ==
Motoki reached the semi-finals in the women's freestyle 59 kg category at the 2022 World Wrestling Championships in Belgrade, Serbia, by defeating Turkish Ebru Dağbaşı in the first round with a 5–0 lead and Alyona Kolesnik, competing for Azerbaijan, in the quarter-finals with a 6–0 lead. She lost to Anastasia Nichita from Moldova 7–5 in the semi-final. In the bronze medal match, she won the bronze medal by beating China's Zhang Qi with a pin while leading 7–0.

In 2023, Motoki competed in the women's 62 kg event at the World Wrestling Championships held in Belgrade, Serbia and won the silver medal. As a result, she earned a quota place for Japan for the 2024 Summer Olympics in Paris, France.

In 2024, she won the silver medal in the women's 62 kg event at the Asian Wrestling Championships held in Bishkek, Kyrgyzstan. Motoki won the gold medal in the women's 62 kg event at the 2024 Summer Olympics in Paris, France. She defeated Iryna Koliadenko of Ukraine in her gold medal match.

== Achievements ==
Year	Tournament	Location	Result	Event
2022	World Championships	Belgrade, Serbia	3rd	Freestyle 59 kg
2023	World Championships	Belgrade, Serbia	2nd	Freestyle 62 kg
2024	Asian Championships	Bishkek, Kyrgyzstan	2nd	Freestyle 62 kg
2024	Summer Olympics	Paris, France	1st	Freestyle 62 kg
2025	World Championships	Zagreb, Croatia	1st	Freestyle 62 kg
