= Laura Mertens =

German freestyle wrestler

Personal information
- Born: 25 May 1993 (age 33)
- Height: 163 cm (5 ft 4 in)

Sport
- Country: Germany
- Sport: Amateur wrestling
- Weight class: 57 kg
- Event: Freestyle
Medal record
Women's freestyle wrestling
Representing Germany
European Championships
Bronze medal – third place	2017 Novi Sad	58 kg

Laura Mertens (born 25 May 1993) is a German freestyle wrestler. She won one of the bronze medals in the 58 kg event at the 2017 European Wrestling Championships held in Novi Sad, Serbia.

== Career ==
In 2010, Mertens competed in the girls' freestyle 46 kg event at the Summer Youth Olympics without winning a medal. She lost her bronze medal match against Petra Olli of Finland. In 2013, Mertens competed in the women's 55 kg event at the European Wrestling Championships held in Tbilisi, Georgia where she was eliminated in her second match by Emese Barka of Hungary.

In 2020, Mertens competed in the women's 57 kg event at the Individual Wrestling World Cup held in Belgrade, Serbia where she was eliminated in the repechage by Alyona Kolesnik of Azerbaijan. In March 2021, she competed at the European Qualification Tournament in Budapest, Hungary hoping to qualify for the 2020 Summer Olympics in Tokyo, Japan. Mertens was eliminated in her second match by Johanna Lindborg of Sweden. She also failed to qualify for the Olympics at the World Olympic Qualification Tournament held in Sofia, Bulgaria.

== Achievements ==
Year	Tournament	Location	Result	Event
2017	European Championships	Novi Sad, Serbia	3rd	Freestyle 58 kg
