= Nataliya Synyshyn =

Ukrainian-Azerbaijani freestyle wrestler

Natalya Synyshyn
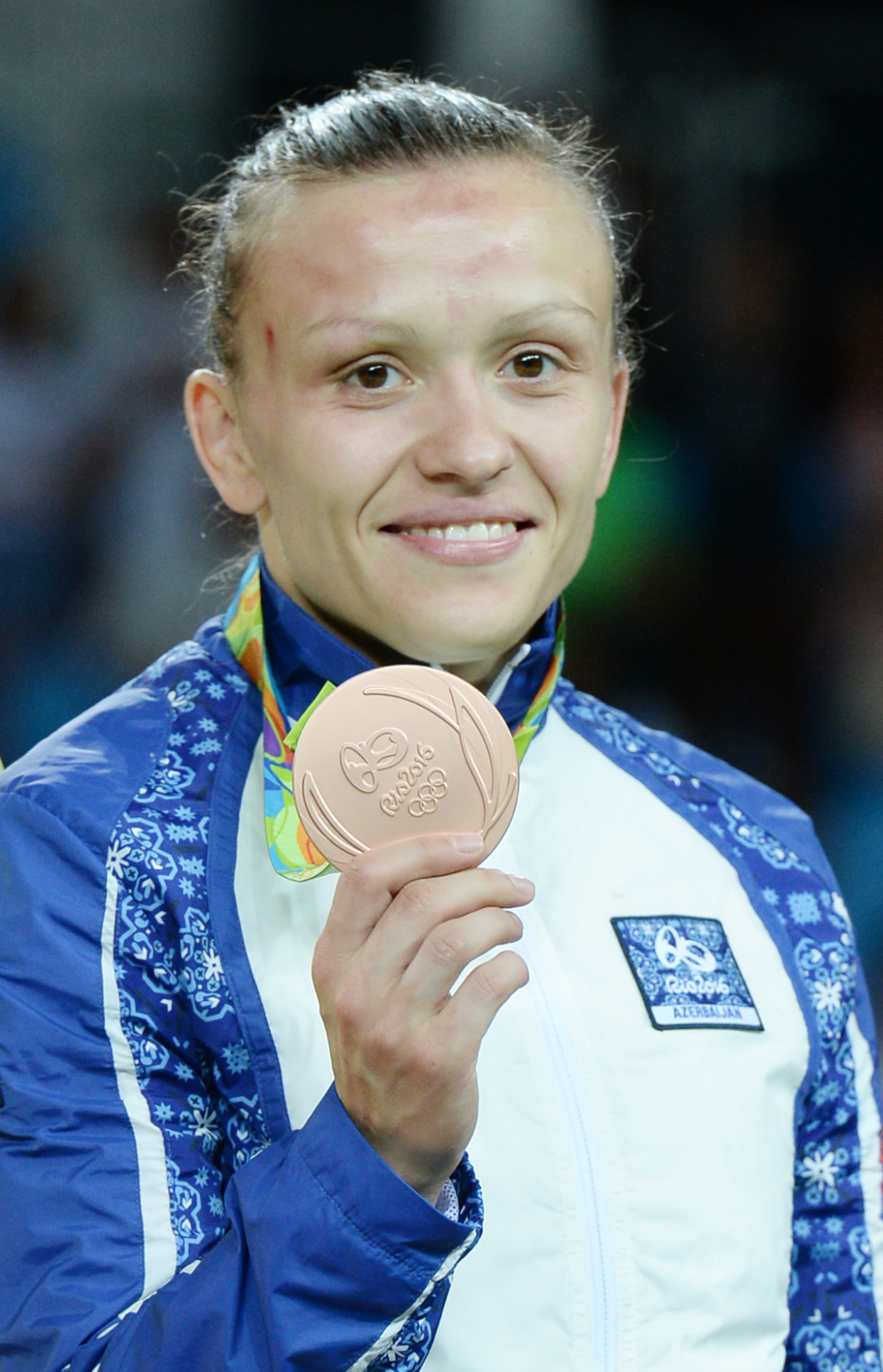
- Synyshyn at the 2016 Summer Olympics

Personal information
- Full name: Natalya Ihorivna Synyshyn
- Nationality: Ukraine (until 2013); Azerbaijan (since 2014)
- Born: 3 July 1985 (age 41) Sosnivka, Lviv Oblast, Ukrainian SSR, Soviet Union
- Height: 1.65 m (5 ft 5 in)
- Weight: 55 kg (121 lb)

Sport
- Country: Ukraine (until 2013); Azerbaijan (since 2014)
- Sport: Wrestling
- Event: Freestyle
- Club: Dynamo Lviv (UKR)
Medal record
Women's freestyle wrestling
Representing Azerbaijan
Summer Olympics
Bronze medal – third place	2016 Rio de Janeiro	53 kg
European Championships
Gold medal – first place	2016 Riga	58 kg
European Games
Bronze medal – third place	2015 Baku	55 kg
Islamic Solidarity Games
Silver medal – second place	2017 Baku	55 kg
Representing Ukraine
World Championships
Bronze medal – third place	2006 Guangzhou	59 kg
Bronze medal – third place	2007 Baku	59 kg
European Championships
Gold medal – first place	2009 Vilnius	55 kg
Gold medal – first place	2012 Belgrad	55 kg
Silver medal – second place	2007 Sofia	59 kg
Bronze medal – third place	2008 Tampere	59 kg

Natalya Ihorivna Synyshyn (Ukrainian: Наталя Ігорівна Синишин; born 3 July 1985) is a Ukrainian-Azerbaijani freestyle wrestler, who has competed in the lightweight division. She is a two-time bronze medalist at the World Championships, and three-time at the European Championships.

== Career ==
Synyshyn competed for Ukraine in the women's 55-kg class in freestyle wrestling at the 2008 Summer Olympics in Beijing. In the first preliminary round, she was defeated by Marcie Van Dusen of the United States, after being taken off the mat by her opponent in the final period, with a three-set score (0–4, 1–1, 7–0), and a classification point score of 1–3.

On 11 March 2016, she won European Wrestling Championships for Azerbaijan. She won a bronze medal for Azerbaijan at the 2016 Summer Olympics.
