= Marcie Van Dusen =

American freestyle wrestler

Personal information
- Nationality: United States
- Born: June 25, 1982 (age 44) Lake Arrowhead, California, U.S.
- Height: 1.65 m (5 ft 5 in)
- Weight: 55 kg (121 lb)

Sport
- Sport: Wrestling
- Event: Freestyle
- Club: Sunkist Kids (USA)
- Coached by: Terry Steiner
Medal record
Women's freestyle wrestling
Representing United States
Pan American Games
Silver medal – second place	2007 Rio de Janeiro	55 kg

Marcie Van Dusen (born June 25, 1982) is an amateur female American freestyle wrestler, who competed for the women's 55-kg category at the 2008 Summer Olympics in Beijing. She is a two-time U.S national and world team trials champion, and a resident athlete at the U.S. Olympic Training Center in Colorado Springs, Colorado. She is also a silver medalist at the 2007 Pan American Games in Rio de Janeiro, Brazil.

== Biography ==
Vandussen born in Lake Arrowhead, California on June 25, 1982, and she attended Rim of the World High School, where she was a member of the mixed varsity wrestling team, coached by John Beresford. She also earned letters in soccer and volleyball, before trying out for wrestling. After graduating from high school, Van Dusen attended three different universities across the United States, including the University of Colorado in Colorado Springs, Colorado, where she received a bachelor of science degree in geography and environmental sciences.

== Wrestling career ==
Upon her admission at the University of Colorado, Van Dusen had been a regular member of the U.S. national wrestling team. In 2002, she moved from California to Colorado Springs, Colorado to work and train as a resident athlete at the U.S. Olympic Training Center. She first competed at the U.S. national championships, where she finished between third and fifth place for three consecutive years. At the span of her wrestling career, she had won numerous championship titles, including three at the U.S. world team trials. In addition to her achievements, Van Dusen finished fifth at the 2004 U.S. Olympic trials, which denied her chance to qualify for the 2004 Summer Olympics. She also made her international debut at the 2006 World Wrestling Championships in Guangzhou, China, where she placed tenth in the women's 55-kg category.

Having achieved her best possible finish at the World Championships, Van Dusen qualified for the 2007 Pan American Games in Rio de Janeiro, Brazil, and competed for the 55-kg category in women's freestyle wrestling. She won the silver medal in the final match after losing out to Colombia's Jackeline Rentería, who emerged as one of the top favorites of this event. Van Dusen managed to repeat her silver medal streak at the 2008 Pan American Wrestling Championships in Colorado Springs, when she was defeated by Canada's Tonya Verbeek in the final match, with a three-set score (1–1, 1–0, 1–1). Van Dusen had never won an international championship title in women's wrestling, until she defeated and upset Japan's Saori Yoshida at the World Cup in Taiyuan, China, snapping the opponent's 119-match winning streak. Van Dusen received an elusive qualifying berth at the 2008 Summer Olympics in Beijing, after competing at the inaugural Olympic qualifying tournament for her respective weight class.

== Olympic games ==
Van Dusen made her official debut at the 2008 Summer Olympics in Beijing, and qualified for the women's 55-kg class in freestyle wrestling. In the first preliminary round, Van Dusen defeated against Ukraine's Natalia Synyshyn, after taking her off the mat by getting a quick leg attack, with a three-set score (0–4, 1–1, 7–0), and a classification point score of 1–3. For the second time, she finally faced against Rentería during the quarterfinal match, after advancing past the first preliminary round. Van Dusen was able to get a two-point takedown in the first period; however, her opponent scored two leg attack takedown against the former, to close the period at 7–2. In the second period, Van Dusen received a two-point takedown within a minute over the opponent, but Rentería was able to hit a three-point counter takedown, and reverse her with exposure for two more points to jump to the five-two score lead. Van Dusen was unable to score in the closing seconds, and ultimately lost in the match for the second time against Rentería, since the Pan American Games in Rio de Janeiro.

== Post-wrestling career ==
After the Olympics, Van Dusen retired from her sporting career, and worked as a program coordinator and coach for Beat The Streets (Los Angeles) Wrestling Program. She also became the first female head coach on the collegiate level, when she served her two-year role as the women's coach at Menlo College in Atherton, California.
