= Kanykei Kubanychbekova =

Kyrgyzstani sports shooter

Personal information
- Full name: Kanykei Boobekovna Kubanychbekova
- Nationality: Kyrgyzstani
- Born: 30 September 1999 (age 26)

Sport
- Sport: Sports shooting

Kanykei Boobekovna Kubanychbekova (Kyrgyz: Каныкей Бообековна Кубанычбекова; born 30 September 1999) is a Kyrgyzstani sports shooter. She competed in the women's 10 metre air rifle event at the 2020 Summer Olympics.
