= Rong Ningning =

Chinese freestyle wrestler

Personal information
- Born: 5 October 1997 (age 28) Kashgar, Xinjiang, China
- Height: 158 cm (5 ft 2 in)

Sport
- Country: China
- Sport: Amateur wrestling
- Weight class: 57 kg (126 lb)
- Event: Freestyle
Medal record
Women's freestyle wrestling
Representing China
World Championships
Gold medal – first place	2018 Budapest	57 kg
Silver medal – second place	2019 Nur-Sultan	57 kg
Asian Championships
Gold medal – first place	2018 Bishkek	59 kg
Gold medal – first place	2019 Xi'an	57 kg
Golden Grand Prix Ivan Yarygin
Gold medal – first place	2018 Krasnoyarsk	59 kg
World U23 Championships
Silver medal – second place	2018 Bucharest	59 kg

Rong Ningning (Chinese: 荣宁宁, born 5 October 1997) is a Chinese freestyle wrestler. She won the gold medal in the women's 57 kg event at the 2018 World Wrestling Championships held in Budapest, Hungary.

== Career ==
In 2017, Rong competed in the 58 kg event at the World Wrestling Championships in Paris, France where she reached the quarterfinals after defeating Jowita Wrzesień and Pooja Dhanda in earlier rounds. In the quarterfinals she was defeated by Marwa Amri who went on to win the silver medal in that event. Rong then entered the repechage where she won her match against Iryna Chykhradze of Ukraine but lost her bronze medal match against Aisuluu Tynybekova of Kyrgyzstan.

In 2018, at the Golden Grand Prix Ivan Yarygin 2018 held in Krasnoyarsk, Russia, she won the gold medal in the women's 59 kg event.

In 2019, she won the gold medal in the women's 57 kg event at the 2019 Asian Wrestling Championships held in Xi'an, China. In the same year, at the World Wrestling Championships held in Nur-Sultan, Kazakhstan, she won the silver medal in the women's 57 kg event.

Rong represented China at the 2020 Summer Olympics in Tokyo, Japan. She competed in the women's 57 kg event where she was eliminated in her first match.

== Achievements ==
Year	Tournament	Location	Result	Event
2018	Asian Championships	Bishkek, Kyrgyzstan	1st	Freestyle 59 kg
2018	World Championships	Budapest, Hungary	1st	Freestyle 57 kg
2019	Asian Championships	Xi'an, China	1st	Freestyle 57 kg
2019	World Championships	Nur-Sultan, Kazakhstan	2nd	Freestyle 57 kg
