= Pürevdorjiin Orkhon =

Mongolian freestyle wrestler

Orkhon Pürevdorj
Personal information
- Native name: Пүрэвдоржийн Орхон
- Nationality: Mongolia
- Born: 25 December 1993 (age 32) Mongolia
- Height: 1.62 m (5 ft 4 in)

Sport
- Country: Mongolia
- Sport: Wrestling
- Weight class: 63 kg
- Event: Freestyle
- Club: Aldar sports committee
- Coached by: Tserenbaataryn Khosbayar Tserenbaataryn Tsogtbayar

Achievements and titles
- Olympic finals: 5th(2024)
- World finals: (gold) (2017)
- Regional finals: (gold) (2018) (silver) (2014, 2023)
Medal record
Women's freestyle wrestling
Representing Mongolia
World Championships
Gold medal – first place	2017 Paris	63 kg
Bronze medal – third place	2025 Zagreb	62 kg
Asian Championships
Gold medal – first place	2018 Bishkek	62 kg
Silver medal – second place	2014 Astana	55 kg
Silver medal – second place	2023 Astana	62 kg
Golden Grand Prix Ivan Yarygin
Gold medal – first place	2016 Krasnoyarsk	58 kg
Gold medal – first place	2017 Krasnoyarsk	63 kg
Gold medal – first place	2018 Krasnoyarsk	62 kg

Pürevdorjiin Orkhon (born 25 December 1993) is a Mongolian freestyle wrestler. She competed in the women's freestyle 58 kg event at the 2016 Summer Olympics, in which she was eliminated in the repechage by Sakshi Malik. In 2017, she won a gold medal at Paris World Wrestling Championships in 63 kg.

She competed at the 2024 Asian Wrestling Olympic Qualification Tournament in Bishkek, Kyrgyzstan and she earned a quota place for Mongolia for the 2024 Summer Olympics in Paris, France. She lost her bronze medal match in the women's 62 kg event at the Olympics.
