= Kayla Miracle =

American wrestler (born 1996)

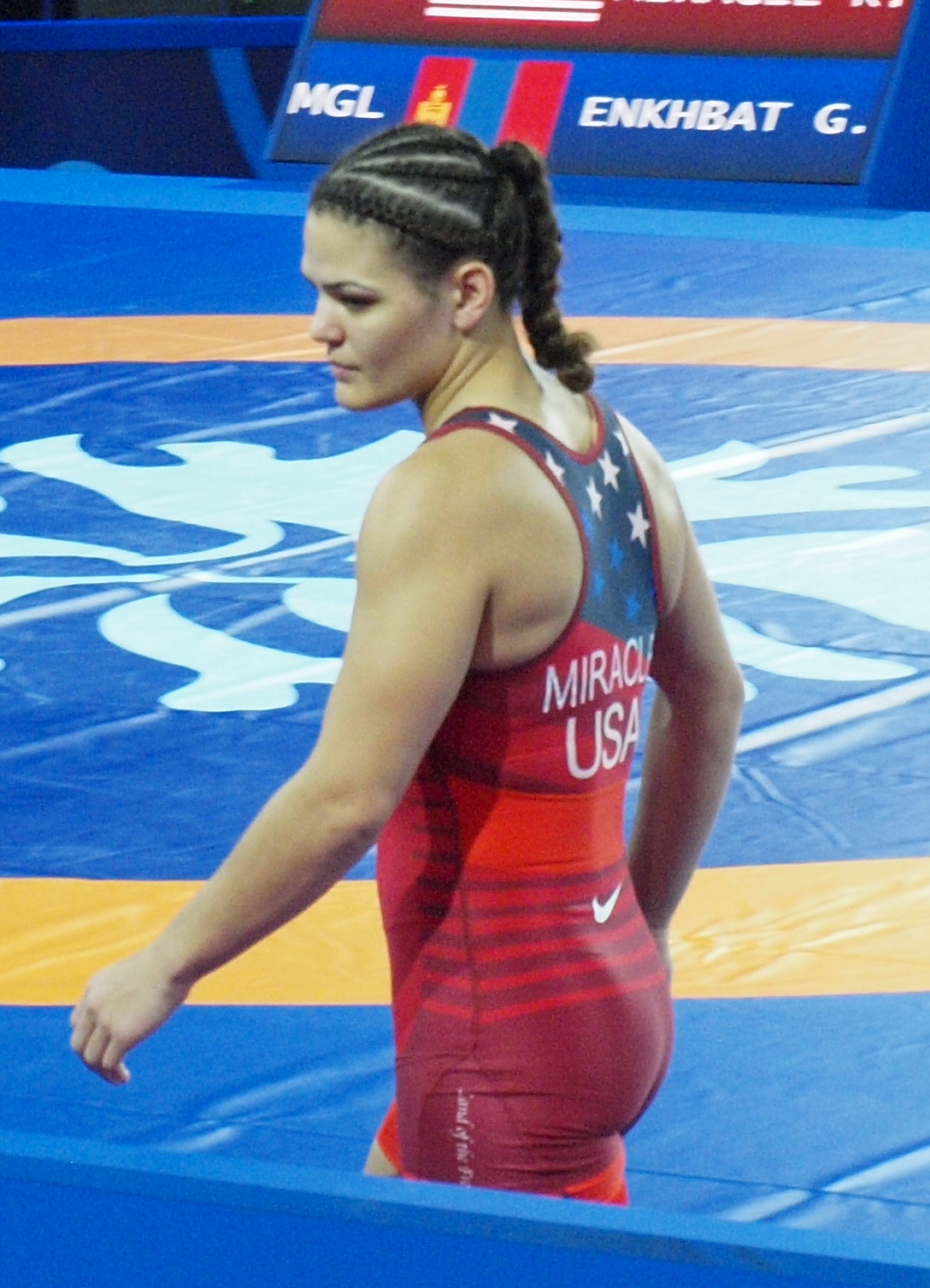
- Kayla Miracle at the 2021 World Wrestling Championships in Oslo, Norway

Personal information
- Full name: Kayla Colleen Kiyoko Miracle
- Born: April 26, 1996 (age 30) Brawley, California, U.S.
- Home town: Culver, Indiana, U.S.
- Height: 5 ft 3 in (160 cm)

Sport
- Country: United States
- Sport: Wrestling
- Weight class: 62 kg / 136 lb
- Event: Freestyle
- College team: Campbellsville University
- Club: Sunkist Kids Wrestling Club
Medal record
Women's freestyle wrestling
Representing United States
World Championships
Silver medal – second place	2021 Oslo	62 kg
Silver medal – second place	2022 Belgrade	62 kg
Pan American Games
Gold medal – first place	2019 Lima	62 kg
Bronze medal – third place	2023 Santiago	62 kg
Pan American Championships
Gold medal – first place	2021 Guatemala City	62 kg
Gold medal – first place	2024 Acapulco	62 kg
Gold medal – first place	2026 Coralville	65 kg
Silver medal – second place	2022 Acapulco	62 kg
Bronze medal – third place	2017 Lauro de Freitas	58 kg
Bronze medal – third place	2018 Lima	62 kg
Bronze medal – third place	2023 Buenos Aires	62 kg

Kayla Colleen Kiyoko Miracle (born April 26, 1996) is an American wrestler competing through Campbellsville University, Kentucky. She is currently majoring in Sports Management.

== Wrestling ==
Miracle is a two time U.S. Open Champion in 2017 and 2018. She won the 2015, 2016, and 2017 University Nationals. She won the 2018 Klippan Lady Open in Sweden. In 2015, she won the 136-pound title in the Women's Collegiate Wrestling Association finals in Saint Louis, Missouri. She is the fourth wrestler to win four Women's Collegiate Wrestling Association national titles.

In 2020, she won the silver medal at the Pan American Wrestling Olympic Qualification Tournament, in the women's 62 kg division.

She currently trains at the Hawkeye Wrestling Club in Iowa City, Iowa.

On February 13, 2018, she was named USA Wrestling Athlete of the Week. She was selected to compete in the 2020 Summer Olympics.

Miracle won the silver medal in the women's 62 kg event at the 2022 World Wrestling Championships held in Belgrade, Serbia. She won one of the bronze medals in the women's 62 kg event at the 2023 Pan American Games held in Santiago, Chile. She defeated Nathaly Grimán of Venezuela in her bronze medal match.

In 2024, Miracle won the gold medal in her event at the Pan American Wrestling Championships held in Acapulco, Mexico. She defeated Ana Godinez of Canada in her gold medal match. A few days later, at the Pan American Wrestling Olympic Qualification Tournament held in Acapulco, Mexico, she earned a quota place for the United States for the 2024 Summer Olympics held in Paris, France. She qualified for the Olympics at the 2024 United States Olympic trials held in State College, Pennsylvania. She competed in the women's 62 kg event at the Olympics.

She won the 2026 US Open at 65 kilograms, qualifying her for Final X in June.

Miracle is a lesbian and the first out LGBTQ Olympic wrestler.
