= Mariana Cherdivara =

Moldovan freestyle wrestler

Personal information
- National team: Moldova
- Born: September 15, 1992 (age 33)
- Height: 162 cm (5 ft 4 in)
- Weight: 61 kg (134 lb)

Sport
- Country: Moldova
- Sport: Wrestling
- Weight class: Women Middleweight 62kg
- Event: Freestyle
Medal record
Women's freestyle wrestling
Representing Moldova
European Championships
| Silver medal – second place | 2017 Novi Sad | 58 kg |
Individual World Cup
| Silver medal – second place | 2020 Belgrade | 59 kg |

Mariana Cherdivara-Eșanu (born 15 September 1992) is a Moldovan freestyle wrestler. She competed in the women's freestyle 58 kg event at the 2016 Summer Olympics, in which she was eliminated in the round of 16 by Sakshi Malik.

In 2020, she won the silver medal in the women's 59 kg event at the 2020 Individual Wrestling World Cup held in Belgrade, Serbia. In March 2021, she competed at the European Qualification Tournament in Budapest, Hungary hoping to qualify for the 2020 Summer Olympics in Tokyo, Japan. She did not qualify at this tournament and she also failed to qualify for the Olympics at the World Olympic Qualification Tournament held in Sofia, Bulgaria.

She competed at the 2024 European Wrestling Olympic Qualification Tournament in Baku, Azerbaijan hoping to qualify for the 2024 Summer Olympics in Paris, France. She was eliminated in her third match and she did not qualify for the Olympics. She also competed at the 2024 World Wrestling Olympic Qualification Tournament held in Istanbul, Turkey without qualifying for the Olympics.

== Major results ==
| Year | Tournament | Venue | Result | Event |
|---|---|---|---|---|
| 2011 | European Championships | Dortmund, Germany | 14th | Freestyle 63 kg |
| 2011 | World Championships | Istanbul, Turkey | 45th | Freestyle 63 kg |
| 2013 | European Championships | (Georgia (country)) Tbilisi, Georgia | 7th | Freestyle 55 kg |
| 2013 | World Championships | Budapest, Hungary | 18th | Freestyle 55 kg |
| 2015 | European Games | Baku, Azerbaijan | 12th | Freestyle 58 kg |
| 2015 | World Championships | Las Vegas, United States | 28th | Freestyle 58 kg |
| 2016 | Olympic Games | Rio de Janeiro, Brazil | 11th | Freestyle 58 kg |
| 2017 | European Championships | Novi Sad, Serbia | 2nd | Freestyle 58 kg |
| 2018 | World Championships | Budapest, Hungary | 14th | Freestyle 59 kg |
| 2019 | European Championships | Bucharest, Romania | 9th | Freestyle 62 kg |
| 2019 | European Games | Minsk, Belarus | 12th | Freestyle 62 kg |
