= Elin Nilsson =

Swedish politician (born 1982)

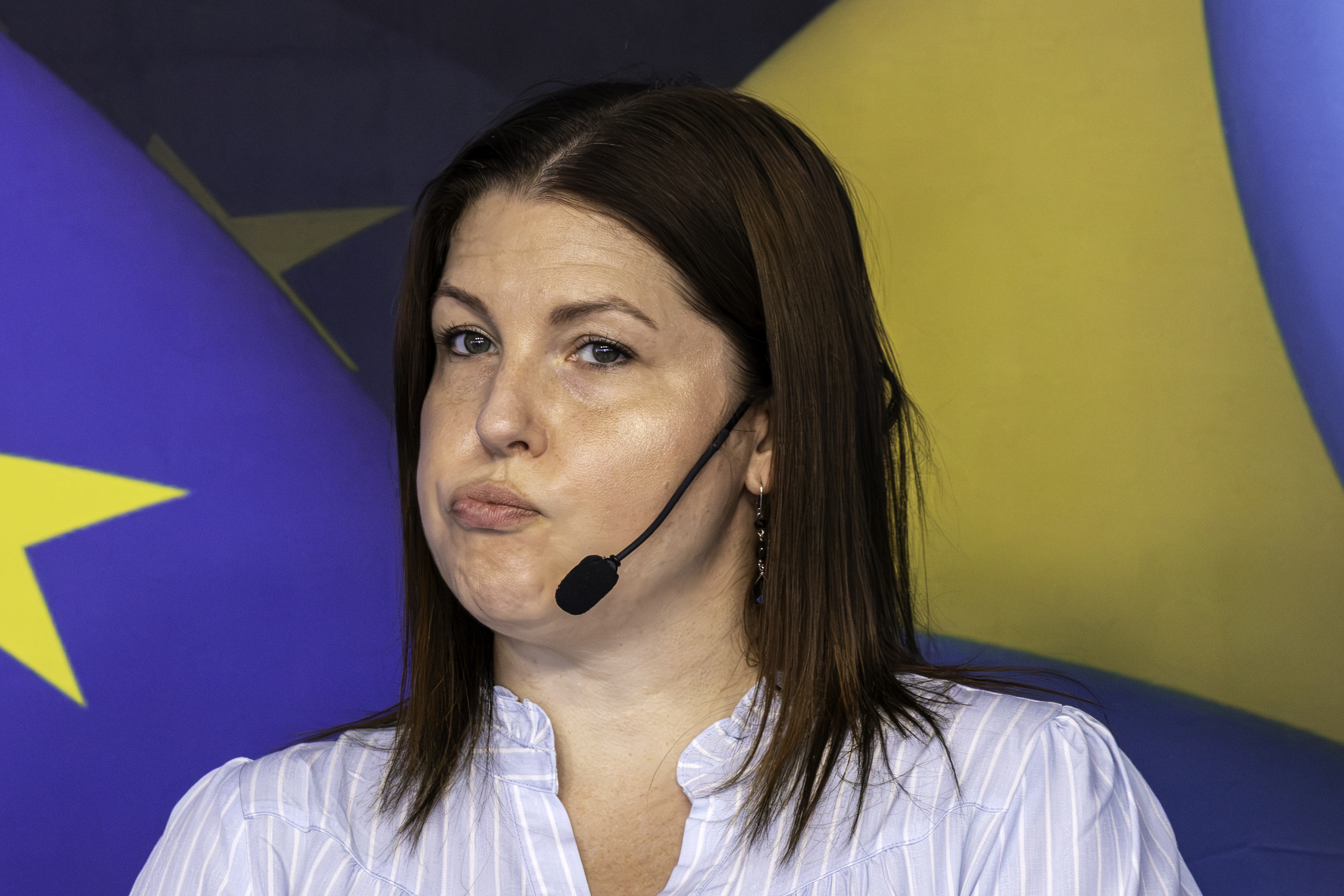
- Elin Nilsson in 2026

Member of the Riksdag
- Incumbent
- Assumed office 2022
- Constituency: Örebro County

Personal details
- Born: 1982 (age 43–44) Örebro County, Sweden
- Party: Liberals

Elin Johanna Nilsson (born 1982) is a Swedish politician from the Liberals. She was elected to the Riksdag in the 2022 general election. She is her party's spokesperson on the environment, rural policy and EU policy.

== See also ==
- List of members of the Riksdag, 2022–2026
