= 2011 World Wrestling Championships – Women's freestyle 63 kg =

Women's freestyle 63 kg at the 2011 World Championships
- Venue: Sinan Erdem Dome
- Dates: 15 September 2011
- Competitors: 45 from 45 nations

Medalists
gold medal	Kaori Icho	Japan
silver medal	Marianna Sastin	Hungary
bronze medal	Ochirbatyn Nasanburmaa	Mongolia
bronze medal	Jing Ruixue	China

The women's freestyle 63 kilograms is a competition featured at the 2011 World Wrestling Championships, and was held at the Sinan Erdem Dome in Istanbul, Turkey on 15 September 2011.

== Results ==
Legend

- F — Won by fall

=== Finals ===
Semifinals			Final
Marianna Sastin (HUN)	2	5
Ochirbatyn Nasanburmaa (MGL)	0	2	Marianna Sastin (HUN)	0	0
Elena Pirozhkova (USA)	0	0	Kaori Icho (JPN)	4	2
Kaori Icho (JPN)	3	3

=== Top half ===
==== Section 1 ====
Round of 64

Round of 32
Audrey Prieto (FRA)	3^{F}
Niclette Mbele (COD)	0
Navjot Kaur (IND)	0	0
Marianna Sastin (HUN)	4	6
Maria Diana (ITA)	1	0	1
Yvonne Englich (GER)	1	1	2
Jacira Mendonca (GBS)	1
Kim Ran-mi (PRK)	5^{F}

Round of 16
Audrey Prieto (FRA)	0	0
Marianna Sastin (HUN)	3	4
Yvonne Englich (GER)	0	2
Kim Ran-mi (PRK)	1	5

Quarterfinals
Marianna Sastin (HUN)	1	7
Kim Ran-mi (PRK)	1	0

==== Section 2 ====
Round of 64

Round of 32
Gozal Zutova (AZE)	4
Taybe Yusein (BUL)	7^{F}
Hanna Savenia (BLR)	0	3	0
Gloria Zavala (VEN)	2	1	4
Lubov Volosova (RUS)	4	5
Dailane Reis (BRA)	0	0
Ochirbatyn Nasanburmaa (MGL)	1	3
Mihaela Panait (ROU)	0	0

Round of 16
Taybe Yusein (BUL)	5	1	0
Gloria Zavala (VEN)	0	3	2
Lubov Volosova (RUS)	0	1	0
Ochirbatyn Nasanburmaa (MGL)	1	0	1

Quarterfinals
Gloria Zavala (VEN)	0	2	3
Ochirbatyn Nasanburmaa (MGL)	1	1	4

=== Bottom half ===
==== Section 3 ====
Round of 64
Stephanie Maierhofer (AUT)	4^{F}
Maria Dunn (GUM)	0
Sandra Roa (COL)	5	1	0
Elena Pirozhkova (USA)	7	0	1
Maminirina Rafaliharisolo (MAD)	0
Luz Vázquez (ARG)	5^{F}
Choe Jin-suk (KOR)	0	3	1
Joyce Milazar (MRI)	1	0	0
María Teresa Méndez (ESP)	0	0
Henna Johansson (SWE)	1	4

Round of 32
Laura Skujiņa (LAT)	2	3
Gavhar Mirzaeva (UZB)	0	0
Sylvie Datty (CAF)	0	1
Stephanie Maierhofer (AUT)	1	3^{F}
Elena Pirozhkova (USA)	3	2
Luz Vázquez (ARG)	1	1
Choe Jin-suk (KOR)	0	0
Henna Johansson (SWE)	1	2

Round of 16
Laura Skujiņa (LAT)	1	4^{F}
Stephanie Maierhofer (AUT)	0	0
Elena Pirozhkova (USA)	1	2
Henna Johansson (SWE)	0	0

Quarterfinals
Laura Skujiņa (LAT)	0	0
Elena Pirozhkova (USA)	1	3

==== Section 4 ====
Round of 64
Hela Riabi (TUN)	1
Yuliya Ostapchuk (UKR)	4^{F}
Yelena Shalygina (KAZ)	0	0
Kaori Icho (JPN)	1	5^{F}
Aisuluu Tynybekova (KGZ)	0	1	2
Michala Spoustová (CZE)	2	0	2
Justine Bouchard (CAN)	1	1	0
Elif Jale Yeşilırmak (TUR)	3	1	1
Blessing Oborududu (NGR)	3	3
Agoro Papavasileiou (GRE)	0	1
Mariana Eșanu (MDA)	0	0
Jing Ruixue (CHN)	4	6^{F}
Charlotte Skauen (NOR)	0	0
Lương Thị Quyên (VIE)	2	2
Ilana Kratysh (ISR)	0
Monika Michalik (POL)	3^{F}

Round of 32
Yuliya Ostapchuk (UKR)	0	0
Kaori Icho (JPN)	2	2
Michala Spoustová (CZE)	0	4^{F}
Elif Jale Yeşilırmak (TUR)	4	0
Blessing Oborududu (NGR)	4	0
Jing Ruixue (CHN)	0	4^{F}
Lương Thị Quyên (VIE)	0	0
Monika Michalik (POL)	1	2

Round of 16
Kaori Icho (JPN)	7^{F}
Michala Spoustová (CZE)	0
Jing Ruixue (CHN)	2	3
Monika Michalik (POL)	0	0

Quarterfinals
Kaori Icho (JPN)	1	1
Jing Ruixue (CHN)	0	0

=== Repechage ===
Repechage round 1
Yelena Shalygina (KAZ)	1	0	0
Yuliya Ostapchuk (UKR)	0	1	1

Repechage round 2
Navjot Kaur (IND)	0	1
Audrey Prieto (FRA)	6	5
Yuliya Ostapchuk (UKR)	6	3^{F}
Michala Spoustová (CZE)	0	0

Repechage round 3
Audrey Prieto (FRA)	0	0
Kim Ran-mi (PRK)	1	1
Yuliya Ostapchuk (UKR)	1	0	0
Jing Ruixue (CHN)	1	2	1

Bronze medals
Kim Ran-mi (PRK)	0	0
Ochirbatyn Nasanburmaa (MGL)	1	1
Jing Ruixue (CHN)	2	1
Elena Pirozhkova (USA)	0	0
