= 2015 World Wrestling Championships – Women's freestyle 63 kg =

Women's freestyle 63 kg at the 2015 World Championships
- Venue: Orleans Arena
- Dates: 10 September 2015
- Competitors: 26 from 26 nations

Medalists
gold medal	Soronzonboldyn Battsetseg	Mongolia
silver medal	Risako Kawai	Japan
bronze medal	Yuliya Tkach	Ukraine
bronze medal	Taybe Yusein	Bulgaria

The Women's freestyle 63 kilograms is a competition featured at the 2015 World Wrestling Championships, and was held in Las Vegas, United States on 10 September 2015.

This freestyle wrestling competition consisted of a single-elimination tournament, with a repechage used to determine the winners of two bronze medals.

== Results ==
Legend

- F — Won by fall

=== Final ===
Final
Risako Kawai (JPN)	0
Soronzonboldyn Battsetseg (MGL)	2^{F}

=== Top half ===
Round of 32
Yuliya Tkach (UKR)	0
Risako Kawai (JPN)	3
Erin Clodgo (USA)	6
Katerina Vidiaux (CUB)	11

Round of 16
Xiluo Zhuoma (CHN)	1
Yekaterina Larionova (KAZ)	10
Giedrė Blekaitytė (LTU)	4
Braxton Stone-Papadopoulos (CAN)	14
Maryia Mamashuk (BLR)	10
Choi Ji-ae (KOR)	0
Risako Kawai (JPN)	14
Katerina Vidiaux (CUB)	4

Quarterfinals
Yekaterina Larionova (KAZ)	6
Braxton Stone-Papadopoulos (CAN)	10^{F}
Maryia Mamashuk (BLR)	0
Risako Kawai (JPN)	7

Semifinals
Braxton Stone-Papadopoulos (CAN)	0
Risako Kawai (JPN)	4^{F}

=== Bottom half ===
Round of 32
Gabriella Sleisz (HUN)	1
Soronzonboldyn Battsetseg (MGL)	12^{F}
Buse Tosun (TUR)	12
Agoro Papavasileiou (GRE)	8
Laís Nunes (BRA)	1
Anastasija Grigorjeva (LAT)	11
Adéla Hanzlíčková (CZE)	3^{F}
Nadine Weinauge (GER)	6
Valeria Lazinskaya (RUS)	1
Taybe Yusein (BUL)	10^{F}
Monika Michalik (POL)	6
Nathaly Grimán (VEN)	0
Kriszta Incze (ROU)	1
Sandra Roa (COL)	4^{F}
Anita Sheoran (IND)	9
Nadya Mushka (AZE)	1

Round of 16
Soronzonboldyn Battsetseg (MGL)	10
Buse Tosun (TUR)	0
Anastasija Grigorjeva (LAT)	14
Adéla Hanzlíčková (CZE)	6
Taybe Yusein (BUL)	5
Monika Michalik (POL)	2
Sandra Roa (COL)	5
Anita Sheoran (IND)	2

Quarterfinals
Soronzonboldyn Battsetseg (MGL)	10
Anastasija Grigorjeva (LAT)	0
Taybe Yusein (BUL)	12
Sandra Roa (COL)	0

Semifinals
Soronzonboldyn Battsetseg (MGL)	11
Taybe Yusein (BUL)	1

=== Repechage ===
Repechage round 1
Yuliya Tkach (UKR)	10
Katerina Vidiaux (CUB)	0
Gabriella Sleisz (HUN)	1
Buse Tosun (TUR)	12

Repechage round 2
Yuliya Tkach (UKR)	9
Maryia Mamashuk (BLR)	2
Buse Tosun (TUR)	9
Anastasija Grigorjeva (LAT)	16

Bronze medals
Yuliya Tkach (UKR)	6
Braxton Stone-Papadopoulos (CAN)	5
Anastasija Grigorjeva (LAT)	2
Taybe Yusein (BUL)	13
