= 2013 World Wrestling Championships – Women's freestyle 63 kg =

Women's freestyle 63 kg at the 2013 World Championships
- Venue: László Papp Budapest Sports Arena
- Dates: 19 September 2013
- Competitors: 28 from 28 nations

Medalists
gold medal	Kaori Icho	Japan
silver medal	Soronzonboldyn Battsetseg	Mongolia
bronze medal	Yekaterina Larionova	Kazakhstan
bronze medal	Elena Pirozhkova	United States

The women's freestyle 63 kilograms is a competition featured at the 2013 World Wrestling Championships, and was held at the László Papp Budapest Sports Arena in Budapest, Hungary on 19 September 2013.

This freestyle wrestling competition consisted of a single-elimination tournament, with a repechage used to determine the winners of two bronze medals.

== Results ==
Legend

- F — Won by fall

=== Final ===
Final
Kaori Icho (JPN)	7
Soronzonboldyn Battsetseg (MGL)	0

=== Top half ===
Round of 32
Justine Bouchard (CAN)	0
Hanna Vasylenko (UKR)	6^{F}
Geetika Jakhar (IND)	0
Maryia Mamashuk (BLR)	5^{F}
Buse Tosun (TUR)	0
Jackeline Rentería (COL)	8^{F}
Katerina Vidiaux (CUB)	3
Irina Netreba (AZE)	11

Round of 16
Henna Johansson (SWE)	1
Xiluo Zhuoma (CHN)	4
Kaori Icho (JPN)	8
Yekaterina Larionova (KAZ)	0
Hanna Vasylenko (UKR)	2
Maryia Mamashuk (BLR)	8
Jackeline Rentería (COL)	12^{F}
Irina Netreba (AZE)	4

Quarterfinals
Xiluo Zhuoma (CHN)	0
Kaori Icho (JPN)	8
Maryia Mamashuk (BLR)	3
Jackeline Rentería (COL)	6^{F}

Semifinals
Kaori Icho (JPN)	10
Jackeline Rentería (COL)	3

=== Bottom half ===
Round of 32
Monika Michalik (POL)	8
Agoro Papavasileiou (GRE)	0
Nguyễn Thị Tâm (VIE)	0
Anta Sambou (SEN)	7^{F}
Klaudia Sándor (HUN)	2
Laís Nunes (BRA)	6
Anastasia Bratchikova (RUS)	8
Viktoria Bobeva (BUL)	0
Irene García (ESP)	6
Laura Raffler (AUT)	2
Maria Diana (ITA)	7
Zumicke Geringer (RSA)	0
Elena Pirozhkova (USA)	9
Haiat Farag (EGY)	2
Nathaly Grimán (VEN)	0
Soronzonboldyn Battsetseg (MGL)	3^{F}

Round of 16
Monika Michalik (POL)	8^{F}
Anta Sambou (SEN)	0
Laís Nunes (BRA)	0
Anastasia Bratchikova (RUS)	5
Irene García (ESP)	2
Maria Diana (ITA)	3^{F}
Elena Pirozhkova (USA)	3
Soronzonboldyn Battsetseg (MGL)	9^{F}

Quarterfinals
Monika Michalik (POL)	2
Anastasia Bratchikova (RUS)	4
Maria Diana (ITA)	0
Soronzonboldyn Battsetseg (MGL)	7^{F}

Semifinals
Anastasia Bratchikova (RUS)	0
Soronzonboldyn Battsetseg (MGL)	5^{F}

=== Repechage ===
Repechage round 1
Nathaly Grimán (VEN)	0
Elena Pirozhkova (USA)	7^{F}

Repechage round 2
Yekaterina Larionova (KAZ)	7
Xiluo Zhuoma (CHN)	0
Elena Pirozhkova (USA)	8
Maria Diana (ITA)	0

Bronze medals
Yekaterina Larionova (KAZ)	5^{F}
Jackeline Rentería (COL)	0
Elena Pirozhkova (USA)	2
Anastasia Bratchikova (RUS)	0
