= 2016 in combat sports =

== Amateur boxing ==
=== 2016 Summer Olympics (AIBA) ===
- August 6 – 21: 2016 Summer Olympics in (Brazil) Rio de Janeiro at the Riocentro
  - Men
  - Men's Light Flyweight: (gold) (Uzbekistan) Hasanboy Dusmatov; (silver) (Colombia) Yuberjén Martínez; (bronze) (Cuba) Joahnys Argilagos; (bronze) (United States) Nico Hernández
  - Men's Flyweight: (gold) (Uzbekistan) Shakhobidin Zoirov; (silver) (Russia) Mikhail Aloyan; (bronze) (Venezuela) Yoel Finol; (bronze) (China) Hu Jianguan
  - Men's Bantamweight: (gold) (Cuba) Robeisy Ramírez; (silver) (United States) Shakur Stevenson; (bronze) (Russia) Vladimir Nikitin; (bronze) (Uzbekistan) Murodjon Akhmadaliev
  - Men's Lightweight: (gold) (Brazil) Robson Conceição; (silver) (France) Sofiane Oumiha; (bronze) (Cuba) Lázaro Álvarez; (bronze) (Mongolia) Dorjnyambuugiin Otgondalai
  - Men's Light Welterweight: (gold) (Uzbekistan) Fazliddin Gaibnazarov; (silver) (Azerbaijan) Lorenzo Sotomayor; (bronze) (Russia) Vitaly Dunaytsev; (bronze) (Germany) Artem Harutyunyan
  - Men's Welterweight: (gold) (Kazakhstan) Daniyar Yeleussinov; (silver) (Uzbekistan) Shakhram Giyasov; (bronze) (Morocco) Mohammed Rabii; (bronze) (France) Souleymane Cissokho
  - Men's Middleweight: (gold) (Cuba) Arlen López; (silver) (Uzbekistan) Bektemir Melikuziev; (bronze) (Mexico) Misael Rodríguez; (bronze) (Azerbaijan) Kamran Shakhsuvarly
  - Men's Light Heavyweight: (gold) (Cuba) Julio César La Cruz; (silver) (Kazakhstan) Adilbek Niyazymbetov; (bronze) (France) Mathieu Bauderlique; (bronze) (United Kingdom) Joshua Buatsi
  - Men's Heavyweight: (gold) (Russia) Evgeny Tishchenko; (silver) (Kazakhstan) Vassiliy Levit; (bronze) (Uzbekistan) Rustam Tulaganov; (bronze) (Cuba) Erislandy Savón
  - Men's Super Heavyweight: (gold) (France) Tony Yoka; (silver) (United Kingdom) Joe Joyce; (bronze) (Croatia) Filip Hrgović; (bronze) (Kazakhstan) Ivan Dychko
  - Women
  - Women's Flyweight: (gold) (United Kingdom) Nicola Adams; (silver) (France) Sarah Ourahmoune; (bronze) (China) Ren Cancan; (bronze) (Colombia) Ingrit Valencia
  - Women's Lightweight: (gold) (France) Estelle Mossely; (silver) (China) Yin Junhua; (bronze) (Finland) Mira Potkonen; (bronze) (Russia) Anastasia Belyakova
  - Women's Middleweight: (gold) (United States) Claressa Shields; (silver) (Netherlands) Nouchka Fontijn; (bronze) (Kazakhstan) Dariga Shakimova; (bronze) (China) Li Qian

=== World and continental boxing championships ===
- March 11 – 19: 2016 AIBA American Continental Championships in (Argentina) Buenos Aires
  - The United States won both the gold and overall medal tallies.
- March 11 – 19: 2016 AIBA African Continental Championships in (Cameroon) Yaoundé
  - Morocco won the gold medal tally. Morocco and Algeria won 7 overall medals each.
- March 25 – April 2: 2016 AIBA Asia/Oceania Continental Championships in Qian'an, Hebei
  - Uzbekistan won the gold medal tally. China won the overall medal tally.
- April 9 – 17: 2016 AIBA European Continental Championships in (Turkey) Samsun
  - Great Britain won both the gold and overall medal tallies.
- May 19 – 27: 2016 AIBA Women's World Boxing Championships in Astana
  - Kazakhstan won the gold medal tally. Kazakhstan and China won 6 overall medals each.
- June 14 – 26: AIBA's Final World Olympic Qualification Event in Baku
  - Azerbaijan won the gold medal tally. The United States and India won 3 overall medals each.
- July 3 – 8: AIBA Pro Boxing (APB) / WSB Olympic Qualification Tournament 2016 in (Venezuela) Vargas
  - Men's 49 kg winner: (Mexico) Joselito Velazquez Altamirano
  - Men's 52 kg winner: (Venezuela) Yoel Segundo Finol Rivas
  - Men's 56 kg winner:
  - Men's 60 kg winner: (Mexico) Lindolfo Delgado Garza
  - Men's 64 kg winner: (Armenia) Hovhannes Bachkov
  - Men's 69 kg winner: (Mexico) Juan Pablo Romero Marin
  - Men's 75 kg winner: (Ecuador) Marlo Delgado
  - Men's 81 kg winner: (Colombia) Juan Carlos Carrillo Palacio
  - Men's 91 kg winner: (Ecuador) Julio Castillo
  - Men's +91 kg winner: (Venezuela) Edgar Muñoz
- October 3 – 8: 2016 World University Boxing Championships in Chiang Mai
  - Thailand won the gold medal tally. Russia won the overall medal tally.
- November 14 – 26: 2016 AIBA Youth World Boxing Championships in (Russia) Saint Petersburg
  - Cuba and the United States won 2 gold medals each. Cuba, the United States, Kazakhstan, and Uzbekistan won 4 overall medals each.

== Fencing ==
- September 19, 2015 – August 14, 2016: 2015–16 FIE Events Calendar

=== 2016 Summer Olympics (FIE) ===
- August 6 – 14: 2016 Summer Olympics in (Brazil) Rio de Janeiro at the Olympic Training Center
  - Men's individual épée: (gold) (South Korea) Park Sang-young; (silver) (Hungary) Géza Imre; (bronze) (France) Gauthier Grumier
  - Men's individual foil: (gold) (Italy) Daniele Garozzo; (silver) (United States) Alexander Massialas; (bronze) (Russia) Timur Safin
  - Men's individual sabre: (gold) (Hungary) Áron Szilágyi; (silver) (United States) Daryl Homer; (bronze) (South Korea) Kim Jung-hwan
  - Women's individual épée: (gold) (Hungary) Emese Szász; (silver) (Italy) Rossella Fiamingo; (bronze) (China) Sun Yiwen
  - Women's individual foil: (gold) (Russia) Inna Deriglazova; (silver) (Italy) Elisa Di Francisca; (bronze) (Tunisia) Inès Boubakri
  - Women's individual sabre: (gold) (Russia) Yana Egorian; (silver) (Russia) Sofiya Velikaya; (bronze) (Ukraine) Olha Kharlan
  - Men's team épée: (gold) France; (silver) Italy; (bronze) Hungary
  - Men's team foil: (gold) Russia; (silver) France; (bronze) United States
  - Women's team épée: (gold) Romania; (silver) China; (bronze) Russia
  - Women's team sabre: (gold) Russia; (silver) Ukraine; (bronze) United States

=== International fencing championships ===
- April 1 – 10: 2016 Junior and Cadet World Fencing Championships in Bourges
  - Junior: France and Russia won 3 gold medals each. Russia and Italy won 9 overall medals each.
  - Cadet: Italy won both the gold and overall medal tallies.
- April 13 – 18: 2016 Asian Fencing Championships in (China) Wuxi
  - South Korea won both the gold and overall medal tallies.
- April 15 – 19: 2016 African Fencing Championships in (Algeria) Algiers
  - Tunisia won the gold medal tally. Tunisia and Egypt won 13 overall medals each.
- April 25 – 27: 2016 World Fencing Championships in (Brazil) Rio de Janeiro (Olympic Test Event)
  - Men's team sabre winners: Russia
  - Women's team foil winners: Russia
- June 20 – 25: 2016 European Fencing Championships in (Poland) Toruń
  - Russia won both the gold and overall medal tallies.
- June 20 – 26: 2016 Pan American Fencing Championships in Panama City
  - The United States won both the gold and overall medal tallies.

=== 2015–16 Fencing Grand Prix ===
- Épée Grand Prix
  - December 4 – 6, 2015: Qatari Grand Prix in (Qatar) Doha
    - Men's Individual winner: (Russia) Vadim Anokhin
    - Women's Individual winner: (Italy) Mara Navarria
  - March 18 – 20: Hungarian Grand Prix in (Hungary) Budapest
    - Men's Individual winner: (France) Gauthier Grumier
    - Women's Individual winner: (China) Xu Anqi
  - April 22 – 24: Brazilian Grand Prix in (Brazil) Rio de Janeiro (Olympic Test Event)
    - Men's Individual winner: (Ukraine) Bohdan Nikishyn
    - Women's Individual winner: (Russia) Tatiana Logunova
- Foil Grand Prix
  - November 27 – 29, 2015: Italian Grand Prix in (Italy) Turin
    - Men's Individual winner: (China) Ma Jianfei
    - Women's Individual winner: (Italy) Alice Volpi
  - March 11 – 13: Cuban Grand Prix in (Cuba) Havana
    - Men's Individual winner: (United Kingdom) Richard Kruse
    - Women's Individual winner: (Italy) Arianna Errigo
  - June 3 – 5: Chinese Grand Prix in (China) Shanghai
    - Men's Individual winner: (United States) Alexander Massialas
    - Women's Individual winner: (Italy) Arianna Errigo
- Sabre Grand Prix
  - December 12 & 13, 2015: American Grand Prix in (United States) Boston
    - Men's Individual winner: (Italy) Aldo Montano
    - Women's Individual winner: (China) Shen Chen
  - March 25 & 26: Korean Grand Prix in (South Korea) Seoul
    - Men's Individual winner: (United States) Eli Dershwitz
    - Women's Individual winner: (Russia) Yana Egorian
  - May 27 – 29: Russian Grand Prix in (Russia) Moscow
    - Men's Individual winner: (South Korea) Kim Jung-hwan
    - Women's Individual winner: (Ukraine) Olha Kharlan

=== 2015–16 Fencing World Cup ===
- Men's Épée World Cup
  - October 23 – 25, 2015: Swiss World Cup in (Switzerland) Bern
    - Individual: (Netherlands) Bas Verwijlen
    - Team: Russia
  - November 13 – 15, 2015: Estonian World Cup in (Estonia) Tallinn
    - Individual: (Japan) Kazuyasu Minobe
    - Team: France
  - January 21 – 23: German Épée World Cup in (Germany) Heidenheim an der Brenz
    - Individual: (France) Gauthier Grumier
    - Team: Italy
  - February 12 – 14: Canadian World Cup in (Canada) Vancouver
    - Individual: (Italy) Enrico Garozzo
    - Team: Hungary
  - May 20 – 22: French Épée World Cup in (France) Paris
    - Individual: (France) Gauthier Grumier
    - Team: Ukraine
- Women's Épée World Cup
  - October 23 – 25, 2015: Italian Épée World Cup #1 in (Italy) Legnano
    - Individual: (China) SUN Yiwen
    - Team: Russia
  - November 13 – 15, 2015: Chinese Épée World Cup in (China) Nanjing
    - Individual: (Romania) Ana Maria Brânză
    - Team: Russia
  - January 22 – 24: Spanish Épée World Cup in (Spain) Barcelona
    - Individual: (Italy) Mara Navarria
    - Team: Estonia
  - February 12 – 14: Argentinian World Cup in (Argentina) Buenos Aires
    - Individual: (Russia) Violetta Kolobova
    - Team: Romania
  - May 20 – 22: Italian Épée World Cup #2 in (Italy) Legnano
    - Individual: (Estonia) Erika Kirpu
    - Team: China
- Men's Foil World Cup
  - October 16 – 18, 2015: American World Cup in (United States) San Jose, California
    - Individual: (Russia) Timur Safin
    - Team: France
  - November 6 – 8, 2015: Japanese World Cup in (Japan) Tokyo
    - Individual: (United States) Alexander Massialas
    - Team: United States
  - January 15 – 17: French Men's Foil World Cup in (France) Paris
    - Individual: (United States) Race Imboden
    - Team: United States
  - February 5 – 7: German Men's Foil World Cup in (Germany) Bonn
    - Individual: (United Kingdom) James Davis
    - Team: Russia
  - May 13 – 15: Russian World Cup in (Russia) Saint Petersburg
    - Individual: (Russia) Dmitry Zherebchenko
    - Team: Italy
- Women's Foil World Cup
  - October 16 – 18, 2015: Mexican World Cup in (Mexico) Cancún
    - Individual: (France) Ysaora Thibus
    - Team: Italy
  - November 6 – 8, 2015: French Women's Foil World Cup in (France) Saint-Maur-des-Fossés
    - Individual: (Italy) Arianna Errigo
    - Team: Italy
  - January 15 – 17: Polish Foil World Cup in (Poland) Gdańsk
    - Individual: (Italy) Arianna Errigo
    - Team: Italy
  - February 5 – 7: Algerian World Cup in (Algeria) Algiers
    - Individual: (Italy) Elisa Di Francisca
    - Team: Russia
  - May 20 – 22: German Women's Foil World Cup in (Germany) Tauberbischofsheim
    - Individual: (Russia) Inna Deriglazova
    - Team: Russia
- Men's Sabre World Cup
  - October 9 – 11, 2015: Georgian World Cup in (Georgia (country)) Tbilisi
    - Individual: (Russia) Aleksey Yakimenko
    - Team: United States
  - October 30 – November 1, 2015: Hungarian World Cup in (Hungary) Budapest
    - Individual: (Russia) Aleksey Yakimenko
    - Team: Russia
  - January 29 – 31: Italian Sabre World Cup in (Italy) Padua
    - Individual: (Italy) Aldo Montano
    - Team: Hungary
  - February 19 – 21: Polish Sabre World Cup in (Poland) Warsaw
    - Individual: (South Korea) Gu Bon-gil
    - Team: United States
  - May 13 – 15: Spanish Sabre World Cup in (Spain) Madrid
    - Individual: (France) Vincent Anstett
    - Team: Germany
- Women's Sabre World Cup
  - October 9 – 11, 2015: Venezuelan World Cup in (Venezuela) Caracas
    - Individual: (United States) Mariel Zagunis
    - Team: Russia
  - October 30 – November 1, 2015: French Sabre World Cup in (France) Orléans
    - Individual: (Russia) Yana Egorian
    - Team: Ukraine
  - January 29 – 31: Greek World Cup in (Greece) Athens
    - Individual: (United States) Mariel Zagunis
    - Team: Ukraine
  - February 19 – 21: Belgian World Cup in (Belgium) Ghent
    - Individual: (Ukraine) Olha Kharlan
    - Team: Russia
  - May 13 – 15: Chinese Sabre World Cup in (China) Foshan
    - Individual: (Ukraine) Olha Kharlan
    - Team: France

== Judo ==
=== 2016 Summer Olympics (IJF) ===
- March 8 & 9: Aquece Rio International Judo Tournament 2016 in (Brazil) Rio de Janeiro (Olympic Test Event)
  - Men's U66 winner: (Japan) Joshiro Maruyama
  - Men's U81 winner: (Brazil) Eduardo Yudi Santos
  - Women's U52 winner: (Japan) Chishima Maeda
  - Women's U63 winner: (Japan) Kaho Yonezawa
- August 6 – 12: 2016 Summer Olympics in (Brazil) Rio de Janeiro at the Olympic Training Center
  - Men
  - Men's 60 kg: (gold) (Russia) Beslan Mudranov; (silver) (Kazakhstan) Yeldos Smetov; (bronze) (Japan) Naohisa Takato; (bronze) (Uzbekistan) Diyorbek Urozboev
  - Men's 66 kg: (gold) (Italy) Fabio Basile; (silver) (South Korea) An Baul; (bronze) (Uzbekistan) Rishod Sobirov; (bronze) (Japan) Masashi Ebinuma
  - Men's 73 kg: (gold) (Japan) Shohei Ono; (silver) (Azerbaijan) Rustam Orujov; (bronze) (Georgia (country)) Lasha Shavdatuashvili; (bronze) (Belgium) Dirk Van Tichelt
  - Men's 81 kg: (gold) (Russia) Khasan Khalmurzaev; (silver) (United States) Travis Stevens; (bronze) (United Arab Emirates) Sergiu Toma; (bronze) (Japan) Takanori Nagase
  - Men's 90 kg: (gold) (Japan) Mashu Baker; (silver) (Georgia (country)) Varlam Liparteliani; (bronze) (South Korea) Gwak Dong-han; (bronze) (China) Cheng Xunzhao
  - Men's 100 kg: (gold) (Czech Republic) Lukáš Krpálek; (silver) (Azerbaijan) Elmar Gasimov; (bronze) (France) Cyrille Maret; (bronze) (Japan) Ryunosuke Haga
  - Men's +100 kg: (gold) (France) Teddy Riner; (silver) (Japan) Hisayoshi Harasawa; (bronze) (Brazil) Rafael Silva; (bronze) (Israel) Or Sasson
  - Women
  - Women's 48 kg: (gold) (Argentina) Paula Pareto; (silver) (South Korea) Jeong Bo-kyeong; (bronze) (Japan) Ami Kondo; (bronze) (Kazakhstan) Galbadrakhyn Otgontsetseg
  - Women's 52 kg: (gold) (Kosovo) Majlinda Kelmendi; (silver) (Italy) Odette Giuffrida; (bronze) (Japan) Misato Nakamura; (bronze) (Russia) Natalia Kuziutina
  - Women's 57 kg: (gold) (Brazil) Rafaela Silva; (silver) (Mongolia) Dorjsürengiin Sumiyaa; (bronze) (Portugal) Telma Monteiro; (bronze) (Japan) Kaori Matsumoto
  - Women's 63 kg: (gold) (Slovenia) Tina Trstenjak; (silver) (France) Clarisse Agbegnenou; (bronze) (Israel) Yarden Gerbi; (bronze) (Netherlands) Anicka van Emden
  - Women's 70 kg: (gold) (Japan) Haruka Tachimoto; (silver) (Colombia) Yuri Alvear; (bronze) (United Kingdom) Sally Conway; (bronze) (Germany) Laura Vargas Koch
  - Women's 78 kg: (gold) (United States) Kayla Harrison; (silver) (France) Audrey Tcheuméo; (bronze) (Brazil) Mayra Aguiar; (bronze) (Slovenia) Anamari Velenšek
  - Women's +78 kg: (gold) (France) Émilie Andéol; (silver) (Cuba) Idalys Ortiz; (bronze) (Japan) Kanae Yamabe; (bronze) (China) Yu Song

=== International judo events ===
- April 8 – 10: 2016 African Judo Championships in Tunis
  - Tunisia won the gold medal tally. Algeria won the overall medal tally.
- April 8 – 10: 2016 Oceania Judo Championships in Canberra
  - Seniors: Australia won both the gold and overall medal tallies.
  - Cadet: Australia won both the gold and overall medal tallies.
  - Junior: Australia won both the gold and overall medal tallies.
- April 15 – 17: 2016 Asian Judo Championships in (Uzbekistan) Tashkent
  - Japan and Mongolia won 4 gold and 11 overall medals each.
- April 21 – 24: 2016 European Judo Championships in (Russia) Kazan
  - France won the gold medal tally. France and Georgia won 7 overall medals each.
- April 29 & 30: 2016 Pan American Judo Championships in (Cuba) Havana
  - Brazil won both the gold and overall medal tallies.
- May 27 – 29: 2016 Judo World Masters in (Mexico) Guadalajara
  - Japan won both the gold and overall medal tallies.
- September 3 & 4: 2016 Asian Open in (Chinese Taipei) Taipei
  - Japan won the gold medal tally. South Korea won the overall medal tally.

=== Judo Grand Slam ===
- February 6 & 7: Grand Slam #1 in Paris
  - Japan won the gold medal tally. Japan and France won 9 overall medals each.
- May 6 – 8: Grand Slam #2 in (Azerbaijan) Baku
  - Japan won both the gold and overall medal tallies.
- July 16 & 17: Grand Slam #3 in Tyumen
  - Japan won the gold medal tally. Russia won the overall medal tally.
- October 28 – 30: Grand Slam #4 in (United Arab Emirates) Abu Dhabi
  - France won the gold medal tally. Brazil won the overall medal tally.
- December 2 – 4: Grand Slam #5 (final) in Tokyo
  - Japan won both the gold and overall medal tallies.

=== Judo Grand Prix ===
- January 22 – 24: Grand Prix #1 in (Cuba) Havana
  - Russia won the gold medal tally. Hungary won the overall medal tally.
- February 19 & 20: Grand Prix #2 in (Germany) Düsseldorf
  - Japan and South Korea won 3 gold medals each. South Korea won the overall medal tally.
- March 25 – 27: Grand Prix #3 in (Georgia (country)) Tbilisi
  - The Netherlands won the gold medal tally. Georgia won the overall medal tally.
- April 1 – 4: Grand Prix #4 in (Turkey) Samsun
  - France won both the gold and overall medal tallies.
- May 13 – 15: Grand Prix #5 in Almaty
  - France won the gold medal tally. Kazakhstan won the overall medal tally.
- June 25 & 26: Grand Prix #6 in (Hungary) Budapest
  - Japan won both the gold and overall medal tallies.
- July 1 – 3: Grand Prix #7 in Ulaanbaatar
  - Mongolia won both the gold and overall medal tallies.
- September 23 – 25: Grand Prix #8 in (Croatia) Zagreb
  - Russia won both the gold and overall medal tallies.
- October 6 – 8: Grand Prix #9 in Tashkent
  - Uzbekistan won both the gold and overall medal tallies.
- November 18 – 20: Grand Prix #10 (final) in Qingdao
  - Russia and Japan won 4 gold medals each. China won the overall medal tally.

=== European Judo Union (EJU) ===
- January 30 – October 30: 2016 EJU Open and Cup events

==== EJU Open ====
- January 30 & 31: EJU Open #1 in (Bulgaria) Sofia
  - Russia and Slovenia won 2 gold medals each. Belarus won the overall medal tally.
- February 13 & 14: EJU Open #2 in (Austria) Oberwart (men only)
  - Mongolia won the gold medal tally. Brazil won the overall medal tally.
- February 13 & 14: EJU Open #3 in (Italy) Rome (women only)
  - Seven different nations won a gold medal each. China won the overall medal tally.
- February 27 & 28: EJU Open #4 in Prague (men only)
  - The Czech Republic won the gold medal tally. Russia won the overall medal tally.
- February 27 & 28: EJU Open #5 in Warsaw (women only)
  - Poland won the gold medal tally. Mongolia and Russia won 5 overall medals each.
- June 4 & 5: EJU Open #6 in (Spain) Madrid
  - Russia won the gold medal tally. France won the overall medal tally.
- September 10 & 11: EJU Open #7 in (Estonia) Tallinn
  - Brazil and Germany won 2 gold medals each. Poland won the overall medal tally.
- October 15 & 16: EJU Open #8 (final) in (United Kingdom) Glasgow
  - Great Britain won the gold medal tally. France won the overall medal tally.

==== EJU Cup ====
- March 5 & 6: EJU Cup #1 in (Switzerland) Uster
  - Germany won both the gold and overall medal tallies.
- March 19 & 20: EJU Cup #2 in (Bosnia and Herzegovina) Sarajevo
  - Five different nations won 2 gold medals each. Turkey won the overall medal tally.
- April 2 & 3: EJU Cup #3 in Dubrovnik
  - Croatia won the gold medal tally. Croatia and France won 9 overall medals each.
- May 14 & 15: EJU Cup #4 in Orenburg
  - Russia won both the gold and overall medal tallies.
- June 11 & 12: EJU Cup #5 in (Slovenia) Celje-Podčetrtek
  - Russia won both the gold and overall medal tallies.
- July 9 & 10: EJU Cup #6 in (Slovakia) Bratislava
  - Germany won both the gold and overall medal tallies.
- August 27 & 28: EJU Cup #7 in Saarbrücken
  - Germany won both the gold and overall medal tallies.
- October 1 & 2: EJU Cup #8 in (Finland) Tampere
  - France won both the gold and overall medal tallies.
- October 8 & 9: EJU Cup #9 in (Serbia) Belgrade
  - Russia won both the gold and overall medal tallies.
- October 29 & 30: EJU Cup #10 (final) in (Spain) Málaga
  - France won both the gold and overall medal tallies.

=== Pan American Judo Confederation (CPJ) ===
- March 5 & 6: CPJ Open #1 in (Peru) Lima
  - Brazil and Russia won 2 gold medals each. Brazil won the overall medal tally.
- March 12 & 13: CPJ Open #2 in (Argentina) Buenos Aires
  - Cuba and Russia won 3 gold medals each. Russia won the overall medal tally.
- March 19 & 20: CPJ Open #3 in Santiago
  - France won the gold medal tally. Chile won the overall medal tally.
- July 2 & 3: CPJ Open #4 (final) in (El Salvador) San Salvador
  - The United States won both the gold and overall medal tallies.

=== African Judo Union (AJU) ===
- January 16 & 17: AJU Open #1 in (Tunisia) Tunis
  - France won both the gold and overall medal tallies.
- March 12 & 13: AJU Open #2 (final) in (Morocco) Casablanca
  - 14 nations won a gold medal each. France won the overall medal tally.

== Taekwondo ==
- January 16 – TBD: 2016 WTF Calendar of Events

=== 2016 Summer Olympics (WTF) ===
- February 20 & 21: Aquece Rio International Taekwondo Tournament 2016 in (Brazil) Rio de Janeiro (Olympic Test Event)
  - Four different nations won a gold medal each. Chinese Taipei won the overall medal tally.
- August 17 – 20: 2016 Summer Olympics in (Brazil) Rio de Janeiro at the Olympic Training Center
  - Men
  - Men's 58 kg: (gold) (China) Zhao Shuai; (silver) (Thailand) Tawin Hanprab; (bronze) (Dominican Republic) Luisito Pie; (bronze) (South Korea) Kim Tae-hun
  - Men's 68 kg: (gold) (Jordan) Ahmad Abughaush; (silver) (Russia) Alexey Denisenko; (bronze) (South Korea) Lee Dae-hoon; (bronze) (Spain) Joel González
  - Men's 80 kg: (gold) (Ivory Coast) Cheick Sallah Cisse; (silver) (United Kingdom) Lutalo Muhammad; (bronze) (Azerbaijan) Milad Beigi; (bronze) (Tunisia) Oussama Oueslati
  - Men's +80 kg: (gold) (Azerbaijan) Radik Isayev; (silver) (Niger) Abdoul Razak Issoufou; (bronze) (Brazil) Maicon de Andrade; (bronze) (South Korea) Cha Dong-min
  - Women
  - Women's 49 kg: (gold) (South Korea) Kim So-hui; (silver) (Serbia) Tijana Bogdanović; (bronze) (Azerbaijan) Patimat Abakarova; (bronze) (Thailand) Panipak Wongpattanakit
  - Women's 57 kg: (gold) (United Kingdom) Jade Jones; (silver) (Spain) Eva Calvo; (bronze) (Iran) Kimia Alizadeh; (bronze) (Egypt) Hedaya Malak
  - Women's 67 kg: (gold) (South Korea) Oh Hye-ri; (silver) (France) Haby Niaré; (bronze) (Ivory Coast) Ruth Gbagbi; (bronze) (Turkey) Nur Tatar
  - Women's +67 kg: (gold) (China) Zheng Shuyin; (silver) (Mexico) María Espinoza; (bronze) (United Kingdom) Bianca Walkden; (bronze) (United States) Jackie Galloway

=== International taekwondo championships ===
- January 16 & 17: 2016 WTF European Olympic Qualification Tournament in (Turkey) Istanbul
  - Azerbaijan won both the gold and overall medal tallies.
- February 6 & 7: 2016 WTF African Olympic Qualification Tournament in Agadir
  - Ivory Coast, Morocco, and Tunisia won 2 gold medals each. Morocco and Tunisia won 3 overall medals each.
- February 18 – 20: 2016 Asian Club Taekwondo Championships in (United Arab Emirates) Dubai
  - Men's winners: (Iran) Shahrdari Varamin
  - Women's winners: (Iran) Team Kan
- February 27: 2016 WTF Oceania Olympic Qualification Tournament in (Papua New Guinea) Port Moresby
  - Men's 58 kg winner: (Australia) Safwan Khalil
  - Men's 68 kg winner: (Papua New Guinea) Maxemillion Kassman
  - Men's 80 kg winner: (Australia) Hayder Shkara
  - Men's +80 kg winner: (Tonga) Pita Taufatofua
  - Women's 49 kg winner: (New Zealand) Andrea Kilday
  - Women's 57 kg winner: (Australia) Caroline Marton
  - Women's 67 kg winner: (Australia) Carmen Marton
  - Women's +67 kg winner: (Papua New Guinea) Samantha Kassman
- March 10 & 11: 2016 WTF Pan American Olympic Qualification Tournament in (Mexico) Aguascalientes City
  - The Dominican Republic and the United States won 2 gold medals each. The Dominican Republic, Colombia, and Cuba won 4 overall medals each.
- April 7 – 9: 2016 World Taekwondo President's Cup (European Region) in (Germany) Bonn (debut event)
  - Turkey won the gold medal tally. Croatia, Russia, and Turkey won 9 overall medals each.
- April 16 & 17: 2016 Asian Taekwondo Olympic Qualification Tournament in (Philippines) Pasay
  - China won the gold medal tally. Jordan, Thailand, and Chinese Taipei won 3 overall medals each.
- April 19 & 20: 2016 Asian Taekwondo Championships in (Philippines) Pasay
  - Men: Iran and South Korea won 3 gold medals each. Iran won the overall medal tally.
  - Women: South Korea won both the gold and overall medal tallies.
- May 19 – 22: 2016 European Taekwondo Championships in (Switzerland) Montreux
  - Great Britain won the gold medal tally. Russia won the overall medal tally.
- May 20 & 21: 2016 African Taekwondo Championships in (Egypt) Port Said
  - Men's 58 kg winner: (Lebanon) Yousef Shriha
  - Men's 68 kg winner: (Egypt) Ghofran Zaki
  - Men's 87 kg winner: (Tunisia) Yassine Trabelsi
  - Men's +87 kg winner: (Niger) Abdoul Issoufou
  - Women's 49 kg winner: (Egypt) Nour Abdelsalam
  - Women's 57 kg winner: (Egypt) Hedaya Malak
  - Women's 67 kg winner: (Egypt) Seham El-Sawalhy
  - Women's 73 kg winner: (Egypt) Maisoun Farouk
- June 10 – 11: 2016 Pan American Taekwondo Championships in Querétaro City
  - Mexico won both the gold and overall medal tallies.
- July 16 & 17: 2016 WTF President's Cup (Oceania Region) in (Australia) Canberra
  - South Korea won all the gold medals here. South Korea also won the overall medal tally.
- July 23 & 24: 2016 WTF World Beach Taekwondo Championships in (Indonesia) Bali (debut event)
  - Event cancelled, due to financial problems.
- September 29 – October 2: 2016 World Taekwondo Poomsae Championships (Peru) Lima
  - South Korea won the gold medal tally. The United States won the overall medal tally.
- October 28 – 30: 2016 WTF President's Cup (Pan American) in Portland, Oregon
  - Canada won the gold medal tally. The United States won the overall medal tally.
- November 16 – 20: 2016 WTF World Junior Taekwondo Championships in (Canada) Burnaby
  - South Korea won the gold medal tally. Russia won the overall medal tally.
- November 26 – 28: 2016 WTF Oceania Taekwondo Championships in (Fiji) Suva
  - Australia won both the gold and overall medal tallies.
- December 9 & 10: 2016 WTF Grand Prix Final in (Azerbaijan) Baku
  - Great Britain won the gold medal tally. South Korea and Russia won 5 overall medals each.
- December 12 & 13: 2016 WTF World Taekwondo Team Championships in Baku
  - Men: Azerbaijan; Women: China; Mixed: South Korea

=== WTF Open ===
- February 2 – 7: 2016 United States Open in Reno, Nevada
  - China won both the gold and overall medal tallies.
- February 11 – 14: 2016 Canada Open in Montreal
  - Chinese Taipei won the gold medal tally. Canada won the overall medal tally.
- February 12 – 14: 2016 Turkish Open in Belek
  - Turkey won both the gold and overall medal tallies.
- February 23 – 25: 2016 Fujairah Open in the United Arab Emirates
  - Egypt, Iran, Norway, and Thailand won 2 gold medals each. Kazakhstan won the overall medal tally.
- March 4 – 6: 2016 Luxor Open in Egypt
  - Belgium won the gold medal tally. Egypt and Germany won 7 overall medals each.
- March 11 – 13: 2016 Dutch Open in (Netherlands) Eindhoven
  - Russia won both the gold and overall medal tallies.
- March 12 & 13: 2016 Mexican Open in Aguascalientes City
  - Canada and Mexico won 2 gold medals each. Mexico won the overall medal tally.
- March 12 – 15: 2016 Qatar Open in Doha
  - France won the gold medal tally. Jordan won the overall medal tally.
- March 18 – 20: 2016 Belgian Open in (Belgium) Lommel
  - Russia won both the gold and overall medal tallies.
- March 25 – 27: 2016 Ukraine Open in Lviv
  - Croatia won the gold medal tally. Ukraine won the overall medal tally.
- April 15 – 17: 2016 Spanish Open in Benicàssim
  - Mexico won the gold medal tally. Spain won the overall medal tally.
- April 23 & 24: 2016 German Open in (Germany) Hamburg
  - South Korea won the gold medal tally. Canada won the overall medal tally.
- May 6 – 8: 2016 Fajr Open in (Iran) Tehran
  - Men's 58 kg winner: (Iran) Mohammad Kazemi
  - Men's 68 kg winner: (Iran) Seyed Hossein Ehsani
  - Men's 80 kg winner: (Russia) Arutiun Meliksetiants
  - Men's +80 kg winner: (Iran) Farshad Ghiyasi
- June 4 & 5: 2016 Austrian Open in (Austria) Innsbruck
  - Thailand won the gold medal tally. Croatia won the overall medal tally.
- June 10 – 12: 2016 Greek Open in (Greece) Thessaloniki
  - Iran won the gold medal tally. Russia won the overall medal tally.
- June 30 – July 5: 2016 Korean Open in (South Korea) Gyeongju
- July 9 & 10: 2016 Luxembourg Open in Kirchberg, Luxembourg
  - Azerbaijan and Turkey won 3 gold medals each. Turkey won the overall medal tally.
- July 15 – 17: 2016 Australian Open
  - Event cancelled.
- July 18 – 20: 2016 Palestinian Open in Ramallah
  - Men: Morocco won the gold medal tally. Morocco, Palestine, and Jordan won 7 overall medals each.
  - Women: Jordan won both the gold and overall medal tallies.
- August 26 – 28: 2016 Costa Rica Open in San José, Costa Rica
  - The United States won both the gold and overall medal tallies.
- September 17 & 18: 2016 Polish Open in (Poland) Warsaw
  - Russia won both the gold and overall medal tallies.
- September 22 – 25: 2016 Russian Open in Moscow
  - South Korea won the gold medal tally. Russia won the overall medal tally.
- October 8 & 9: 2016 Riga Open in Latvia
  - Russia won both the gold and overall medal tallies.
- October 29 & 30: 2016 Serbia Open in Belgrade
  - Croatia won both the gold and overall medal tallies.
- November 12 & 13: 2016 Croatia Open in Zagreb
  - China won the gold medal tally. Croatia won the overall medal tally.
- November 26 & 27: 2016 French Open in Paris
  - Spain and France won 3 gold medals each. Spain won the overall medal tally.
- November 27 & 28: 2016 Israeli Open in (Israel) Ramla
  - Spain won both the gold and overall medal tallies.

== Wrestling ==
- January 9 – December 9: 2016 UWW Events Calendar

=== 2016 Summer Olympics (UWW) ===
- January 30 & 31: Aquece Rio International Women's Wrestling Tournament in (Brazil) Rio de Janeiro (Olympic Test Event)
  - Women's Freestyle: China won both the gold and overall medal tallies.
- March 4 – 6: 2016 Pan-American Olympic Qualifying Event in (United States) Frisco, Texas
  - Men's Freestyle: Cuba won both the gold and overall medal tallies.
  - Women's Freestyle: Canada won the gold medal tally. Canada, Cuba, and Venezuela won 4 overall medals each.
  - Greco-Roman: Cuba and Venezuela won 2 gold medals each. Venezuela won the overall medal tally.
- March 18 – 20: 2016 Asian Olympic Qualifying Event in Astana
  - Men's Freestyle: Six nations won a gold medal each. Japan won the overall medal tally.
  - Women's Freestyle: Kazakhstan won both the gold and overall medal tallies.
  - Greco-Roman: China won the gold medal tally. China and Uzbekistan won 4 overall medals each.
- April 1 – 3: 2016 African and Oceania Olympic Qualifying Event in (Algeria) Algiers
  - Men's Freestyle: Egypt and Nigeria won 2 gold medals each. Egypt won the overall medal tally.
  - Women's Freestyle: Nigeria and Tunisia won 2 gold medals each. Nigeria won the overall medal tally.
  - Greco-Roman: Egypt won both the gold and overall medal tallies.
- April 15 – 17: 2016 European Olympic Qualifying Event in Zrenjanin
  - Men's Freestyle: Poland won both the gold and overall medal tallies.
  - Women's Freestyle: Bulgaria and Poland won 2 gold medals each. Ukraine won the overall medal tally.
  - Greco-Roman: Estonia and Russia won 2 gold medals each. Georgia and Serbia won 3 overall medals each.
- April 21 – 23: First Olympic Games World Qualifying Event in (Mongolia) Ulaanbaatar
  - Men's Freestyle: Six nations won one gold medal each. Moldova, Poland, and Turkey won 2 overall medals each.
  - Women's Freestyle: Six nations won one gold medal each. Russia and the United States won 3 overall medals each.
  - Greco-Roman: Belarus won the gold medal tally. Belarus, Armenia, China, Sweden, and Uzbekistan all won 2 overall medals each.
- May 6 – 8: Second and Final Olympic Games World Qualifying Event in Istanbul
  - Men's Freestyle: Six nations won a gold medal each. Uzbekistan, Romania, Belarus, and Poland won 2 overall medals each.
  - Women's Freestyle: Russia and Ukraine won 2 gold medals each. Ukraine won the overall medal tally.
  - Greco-Roman: Turkey won both the gold and overall medal tallies.
- August 14 – 21: 2016 Summer Olympics in (Brazil) Rio de Janeiro at the Olympic Training Center
  - Men's Freestyle
  - Men's 57 kg: (gold) (Georgia (country)) Vladimer Khinchegashvili; (silver) (Japan) Rei Higuchi; (bronze) (Azerbaijan) Haji Aliyev; (bronze) (Iran) Hassan Rahimi
  - Men's 65 kg: (gold) (Russia) Soslan Ramonov; (silver) (Azerbaijan) Toghrul Asgarov; (bronze) (Italy) Frank Chamizo; (bronze) (Uzbekistan) Ikhtiyor Navruzov
  - Men's 74 kg: (gold) (Iran) Hassan Yazdani; (silver) (Russia) Aniuar Geduev; (bronze) (Azerbaijan) Jabrayil Hasanov; (bronze) (Turkey) Soner Demirtaş
  - Men's 86 kg: (gold) (Russia) Abdulrashid Sadulaev; (silver) (Turkey) Selim Yaşar; (bronze) (Azerbaijan) Sharif Sharifov; (bronze) (United States) J'den Cox
  - Men's 97 kg: (gold) (United States) Kyle Snyder; (silver) (Azerbaijan) Khetag Gazyumov; (bronze) (Romania) Albert Saritov; (bronze) (Uzbekistan) Magomed Abdulmuminovich Ibragimov
  - Men's 125 kg: (gold) (Turkey) Taha Akgül; (silver) (Iran) Komeil Ghasemi; (bronze) (Belarus) Ibrahim Saidau; (bronze) (Georgia (country)) Geno Petriashvili
  - Women's Freestyle
  - Women's 48 kg: (gold) (Japan) Eri Tosaka; (silver) (Azerbaijan) Mariya Stadnik; (bronze) (China) Sun Yanan; (bronze) (Bulgaria) Elitsa Yankova
  - Women's 53 kg: (gold) (United States) Helen Maroulis; (silver) (Japan) Saori Yoshida; (bronze) (Azerbaijan) Nataliya Synyshyn; (bronze) (Sweden) Sofia Mattsson
  - Women's 58 kg: (gold) (Japan) Kaori Icho; (silver) (Russia) Valeria Koblova; (bronze) (Tunisia) Marwa Amri; (bronze) (India) Sakshi Malik
  - Women's 63 kg: (gold) (Japan) Risako Kawai; (silver) (Belarus) Maryia Mamashuk; (bronze) (Kazakhstan) Yekaterina Larionova; (bronze) (Poland) Monika Michalik
  - Women's 69 kg: (gold) (Japan) Sara Dosho; (silver) (Russia) Nataliya Vorobyova; (bronze) (Kazakhstan) Elmira Syzdykova; (bronze) (Sweden) Jenny Fransson
  - Women's 75 kg: (gold) (Canada) Erica Wiebe; (silver) (Kazakhstan) Guzel Manyurova; (bronze) (China) Zhang Fengliu; (bronze) (Russia) Ekaterina Bukina
  - Greco-Roman
  - Men's 59 kg: (gold) (Cuba) Ismael Borrero; (silver) (Japan) Shinobu Ota; (bronze) (Uzbekistan) Elmurat Tasmuradov; (bronze) (Norway) Stig André Berge
  - Men's 66 kg: (gold) (Serbia) Davor Štefanek; (silver) (Armenia) Migran Arutyunyan; (bronze) (Georgia (country)) Shmagi Bolkvadze; (bronze) (Azerbaijan) Rasul Chunayev
  - Men's 75 kg: (gold) (Russia) Roman Vlasov; (silver) (Denmark) Mark Madsen; (bronze) (South Korea) Kim Hyeon-woo; (bronze) (Iran) Saeid Abdevali
  - Men's 85 kg: (gold) (Russia) Davit Chakvetadze; (silver) (Ukraine) Zhan Beleniuk; (bronze) (Belarus) Javid Hamzatau; (bronze) (Germany) Denis Kudla
  - Men's 98 kg: (gold) (Armenia) Artur Aleksanyan; (silver) (Cuba) Yasmany Lugo; (bronze) (Turkey) Cenk İldem; (bronze) (Iran) Ghasem Rezaei
  - Men's 130 kg: (gold) (Cuba) Mijaín López; (silver) (Turkey) Rıza Kayaalp; (bronze) (Azerbaijan) Sabah Shariati; (bronze) (Russia) Sergey Semenov

=== World wrestling championships ===
- August 30 – September 4: 2016 World Junior Wrestling Championships in (France) Mâcon
  - Junior Men's Freestyle: Russia, Iran, and the United States won 2 gold medals each. Russia won the overall medal tally.
  - Junior Women's Freestyle: Japan won both the gold and overall medal tallies.
  - Junior Greco-Roman: Georgia won both the gold and overall medal tallies.
- September 13 – 18: 2016 World Cadet Wrestling Championships in (Georgia (country)) Tbilisi
  - Cadet Men's Freestyle: The United States won the gold medal tally. The United States and Russia won 7 overall medals each.
  - Cadet Women's Freestyle: Japan won both the gold and overall medal tallies.
  - Cadet Greco-Roman: Iran and Georgia won 2 gold medals each. Russia won the overall medal tally.
- September 23 – 25: 2016 World Veteran Wrestling Championships (Greco-Roman) in (Finland) Seinäjoki
  - For results, click here and click at the Results & Videos tab.
- October 7 – 9: 2016 World Veteran Wrestling Championships (Men's & Women's Freestyle) in (Poland) Wałbrzych
  - For results, click here and click at the Results & Videos tab.
- October 25 – 30: 2016 World University Wrestling Championships in Çorum
  - Men's Freestyle: Iran won both the gold and overall medal tallies.
  - Women's Freestyle: Russia and Canada won 3 gold medals each. Russia won the overall medal tally.
  - Greco-Roman: Hungary won the gold medal tally. Belarus and Turkey won 6 overall medals each.
- December 10 & 11: 2016 Non-Olympic Weight Categories World Championships in (Hungary) Budapest
  - Men's Freestyle (61 kg) winner: (United States) Logan Stieber
  - Men's Freestyle (70 kg) winner: (Russia) Magomed Kurbanaliev
  - Women's Freestyle (55 kg) winner: (Japan) Mayu Mukaida
  - Women's Freestyle (60 kg) winner: (China) PEI Xingru
  - Greco-Roman (71 kg) winner: (Hungary) Bálint Korpasi
  - Greco-Roman (80 kg) winner: (Russia) Ramazan Abacharaev

=== World cup of wrestling ===
- May 19 & 20: 2016 Wrestling World Cup - Men's Greco-Roman in Shiraz
  - Iran won all the gold medals. Russia won all the silver medals. Turkey won all the bronze medals.
- June 11 & 12: 2016 Wrestling World Cup - Men's Freestyle in (United States) Los Angeles
  - Iran won the gold medal tally. Iran and Russia won 8 overall medals each.
- November 30 – December 1: 2016 World Wrestling Clubs Cup for Men's Freestyle in Kharkiv
  - The United States won the gold medal tally. Ukraine won all the bronze medals; therefore, this country won the overall medal tally.
- December 8 & 9: 2016 World Wrestling Clubs Cup for Men's Greco-Roman in (Hungary) Budapest
  - Iran won both the gold and overall medal tallies.

=== Grand Prix of wrestling ===
- January 23: Grand Prix Zagreb Open in Croatia
  - Greco-Roman: Hungary won the gold medal tally. Hungary and Serbia won 8 overall medals each.
- February 5 – 7: Hungarian Grand Prix in Szombathely
  - Greco-Roman: China won the gold medal tally. Hungary won the overall medal tally.
- May 14 & 15: Grand Prix of Germany #1 in Dormagen
  - Women's Freestyle: Canada won the gold medal tally. Germany and Russia won 7 overall medals each.
- July 2 & 3: Grand Prix of Germany #2 in Dortmund
  - Men's Freestyle: Azerbaijan won both the gold and overall medal tallies.
  - Greco-Roman: Russia, Germany, and Turkey won 2 gold medals each. Russia won the overall medal tally.
- July 9 & 10: Grand Prix of Spain in Madrid
  - Men's Freestyle: Mongolia, Cuba, and the United States won 2 gold medals each. Mongolia won the overall medal tally.
  - Women's Freestyle: Russia won both the gold and overall medal tallies.
  - Greco-Roman: Russia won both the gold and overall medal tallies.
- November 24 – 26: 2016 Golden Grand Prix Final in Baku
  - Men's Freestyle: Russia won both the gold and overall medal tallies.
  - Women's Freestyle: China, Japan, and Ukraine won 2 gold medals each. China won the overall medal tally.
  - Greco-Roman: Azerbaijan won both the gold and overall medal tallies.

=== Continental wrestling championships ===
- February 12 – 16: 2016 Asian Wrestling Championships in (Thailand) Bangkok
  - Men's Freestyle: Iran won both the gold and overall medal tallies.
  - Women's Freestyle: China won both the gold and overall medal tallies.
  - Greco-Roman: Iran won both the gold and overall medal tallies.
- February 26 – 28: 2016 Pan-American Wrestling Championships in Frisco, Texas
  - Men's Freestyle: The United States won both the gold and overall medal tallies.
  - Women's Freestyle: Canada and the United States won 3 gold medals each. The United States won the overall medal tally.
  - Greco-Roman: Cuba won the gold medal tally. The United States won the overall medal tally.
- March 4 – 6: 2016 African Wrestling Championships in Alexandria
  - Men's Freestyle: Tunisia won the gold medal tally. Egypt won the overall medal tally.
  - Women's Freestyle: Nigeria won the gold medal tally. Nigeria, Tunisia, and Egypt won 6 overall medals each.
  - Greco-Roman: Egypt won both the gold and overall medal tallies.
- March 8 – 13: 2016 European Wrestling Championships in (Latvia) Riga
  - Men's Freestyle: Russia won the gold medal tally. Georgia won the overall medal tally.
  - Women's Freestyle: Azerbaijan won the gold medal tally. Ukraine won the overall medal tally.
  - Greco-Roman: Russia won the gold medal tally. Armenia won the overall medal tally.
- March 11 & 12: 2016 Oceania Wrestling Championships in Hamilton, New Zealand
  - Men's Freestyle: New Zealand won both the gold and overall medal tallies.
  - Women's Freestyle: Australia won both the gold and overall medal tallies.
  - Greco-Roman: New Zealand won the gold medal tally. New Zealand and American Samoa won 7 overall medals each.
  - Beach Wrestling: New Zealand won both the gold and overall medal tallies.
  - Junior Men's Freestyle: New Zealand won both the gold and overall medal tallies.
  - Junior Women's Freestyle: Guam, Australia, Marshall Islands, and Tonga won a gold medal each. Guam won the overall medal tally.
  - Junior Greco-Roman: American Samoa won both the gold and overall medal tallies.
  - Cadet Men's Freestyle: New Zealand won both the gold and overall medal tallies.
  - Cadet Women's Freestyle winners:
    - 56 kg: (New Zealand) Millie Culshaw (default)
    - 60 kg: (Guam) Rckaela Maree Ramos Aquino (default)
  - Cadet Greco-Roman: New Zealand won both the gold and overall medal tallies.
  - Cadet Beach Wrestling winner: (New Zealand) Ronin Ainsley
- March 29 – April 3: 2016 European U23 Championship in Ruse, Bulgaria
  - Men's Freestyle: Russia won both the gold and overall medal tallies.
  - Women's Freestyle: Russia, Turkey, and Ukraine won 2 gold medals each. Russia and Ukraine won 6 overall medals each.
  - Greco-Roman: Georgia won both the gold and overall medal tallies.
- May 28 & 29: 2016 Nordic Wrestling Championship in (Estonia) Tallinn
  - Women's Freestyle: Sweden won the gold medal tally. Finland won the overall medal tally.
  - Greco-Roman: Sweden won both the gold and overall medal tallies.
  - Junior Greco-Roman: Finland won both the gold and overall medal tallies.
  - Cadet Women's Freestyle: Sweden won both the gold and overall medal tallies.
  - Cadet Greco-Roman: Norway won the gold medal tally. Norway and Sweden won 6 overall medals each.
- May 31 – June 5: 2016 Asian Junior Wrestling Championships in (Philippines) Manila
  - Junior Men's Freestyle: Iran won the gold medal tally. India won the overall medal tally.
  - Junior Women's Freestyle: China won the gold medal tally. China and Japan won 7 overall medals each.
  - Junior Greco-Roman: Iran won the gold medal tally. Kyrgyzstan won the overall medal tally.
- June 10 – 12: 2016 Pan-American Junior Wrestling Championships in Barinas
  - Junior Men's Freestyle: Venezuela and Canada won 3 gold and 6 overall medals each.
  - Junior Women's Freestyle: Venezuela won the gold medal tally. Venezuela and Ecuador won 7 overall medals each.
  - Junior Greco-Roman: Venezuela won both the gold and overall medal tallies.
- June 21 – 26: 2016 European Junior Wrestling Championships in (Romania) Bucharest
  - Junior Men's Freestyle: Russia won both the gold and overall medal tallies.
  - Junior Women's Freestyle: Russia won both the gold and overall medal tallies.
  - Junior Greco-Roman: Georgia and Azerbaijan won 3 gold medals each. Georgia won the overall medal tally.
- July 1 – 3: 2016 Pan-American Cadet Wrestling Championships in (Peru) Lima
  - Cadet Men's Freestyle: The United States won both the gold and overall medal tallies.
  - Cadet Women's Freestyle: The United States won the gold medal tally. Canada won the overall medal tally.
  - Cadet Greco-Roman: The United States won both the gold and overall medal tallies.
- July 7 – 10: 2016 Asian Cadet Wrestling Championships in (Chinese Taipei) Taichung
  - Cadet Men's Freestyle: Iran won the gold medal tally. India won the overall medal tally.
  - Cadet Women's Freestyle: Japan won both the gold and overall medal tallies.
  - Cadet Greco-Roman: Iran won the gold medal tally. India won the overall medal tally.
- July 19 – 24: 2016 European Cadet Wrestling Championships in (Sweden) Stockholm
  - Cadet Men's Freestyle: Russia won the gold medal tally. Azerbaijan won the overall medal tally.
  - Cadet Women's Freestyle: Russia won both the gold and overall medal tallies.
  - Cadet Greco-Roman: Russia won both the gold and overall medal tallies.
- October 7 – 9: 2016 Balkan Junior Wrestling Championships in (Romania) Craiova
  - Junior Men's Freestyle: Turkey won both the gold and overall medal tallies.
  - Junior Women's Freestyle: Bulgaria won the gold medal tally. Turkey won the overall medal tally.
  - Junior Greco-Roman: Turkey won both the gold and overall medal tallies.
- November 5 & 6: 2016 Commonwealth Wrestling Championships in Singapore
  - Men's Freestyle: India won all the gold medals and won the overall medal tally, too.
  - Women's Freestyle: India won both the gold and overall medal tallies.
  - Greco-Roman: India won all the gold and silver medals. Pakistan won all the bronze medals.
- November 19 & 20: 2016 Mediterranean Wrestling Championships in Madrid
  - Men's Freestyle: Spain won both the gold and overall medal tallies.
  - Women's Freestyle: Spain and Tunisia won 3 gold medals each. Spain won the overall medal tally.
  - Greco-Roman: Spain won both the gold and overall medal tallies.
  - Junior Men's Freestyle: Spain and Algeria won 3 gold medals each. Spain won the overall medal tally.
  - Junior Women's Freestyle: Algeria won the gold medal tally. Tunisia won the overall medal tally.
  - Junior Greco-Roman: Spain won both the gold and overall medal tallies.
