= 2014 European Wrestling Championships – Women's freestyle 63 kg =

Wrestling competitions

The women's freestyle 63 kg is a competition featured at the 2014 European Wrestling Championships, and was held in Vantaa, Finland on 1 April 2014.

== Medalists ==
Gold	Anastasija Grigorjeva; Latvia
Silver	Maria Mamashuk; Belarus
Bronze	Yuliya Tkach; Ukraine
Bronze	Dzhanan Manolova; Bulgaria

== Results ==
Legend

- F — Won by fall

=== Main bracket ===
Round of 16
Buse Tosun (TUR)	12
Indrė Bubelytė (LTU)	1
Anastasija Grigorjeva (LAT)	13^{F}
Adéla Hanzlíčková (CZE)	2
Yuliya Tkach (UKR)	13
Aurora Fajardo (ESP)	3
Monika Michalik (POL)	2
Inna Trazhukova (RUS)	6
Dzhanan Manolova (BUL)	4^{F}
Nadine Weinauge (GER)	0
Agoro Papavasiliou (GRE)	6
Gabriella Sleisz (HUN)	3
Henna Johansson (SWE)	10
Beatrice Oancea (ROU)	0
Maria Mamashuk (BLR)	13
Maria Diana (ITA)	2

Quarterfinals
Buse Tosun (TUR)	5
Anastasija Grigorjeva (LAT)	15
Yuliya Tkach (UKR)	8
Inna Trazhukova (RUS)	0
Dzhanan Manolova (BUL)	3
Agoro Papavasiliou (GRE)	0
Henna Johansson (SWE)	0
Maria Mamashuk (BLR)	5

Semifinals
Anastasija Grigorjeva (LAT)	6
Yuliya Tkach (UKR)	3
Dzhanan Manolova (BUL)	2
Maria Mamashuk (BLR)	6

Final
Anastasija Grigorjeva (LAT)	10
Maria Mamashuk (BLR)	2

=== Repechage ===
Repechage round 1
Adéla Hanzlíčková (CZE)	9^{F}
Buse Tosun (TUR)	4
Maria Diana (ITA)	2
Henna Johansson (SWE)	4

Bronze medals
Adéla Hanzlíčková (CZE)	0
Yuliya Tkach (UKR)	4^{F}
Henna Johansson (SWE)	3
Dzhanan Manolova (BUL)	5^{F}
