= 2010 World Wrestling Championships – Women's freestyle 63 kg =

Women's freestyle 63 kg at the 2010 World Championships
- Venue: Olympic Stadium
- Dates: 9 September 2010
- Competitors: 28 from 28 nations

Medalists
| gold medal | Kaori Icho | Japan |
| silver medal | Elena Pirozhkova | United States |
| bronze medal | Henna Johansson | Sweden |
| bronze medal | Lubov Volosova | Russia |

The women's freestyle 63 kilograms is a competition featured at the 2010 World Wrestling Championships, and was held at the Olympic Stadium in Moscow, Russia on 9 September.

This freestyle wrestling competition consists of a single-elimination tournament, with a repechage used to determine the winner of two bronze medals.

== Results ==
Legend

- F — Won by fall

=== Final ===
| Final |
| Kaori Icho (JPN) | 1 | 6 |
| Elena Pirozhkova (USA) | 1 | 0 |

=== Top half ===
Round of 32
Gozal Zutova (AZE) | 4^{F}
Audrey Prieto (FRA) | 0
Ochirbatyn Nasanburmaa (MGL) | 4^{F}
Gavhar Mirzaeva (UZB) | 0
Monika Michalik (POL) | 0 | 0
Justine Bouchard (CAN) | 1 | 4
Agoro Papavasileiou (GRE) | 0 | 0
Marianna Sastin (HUN) | 3 | 1

Round of 16
Chen Meng (CHN) | 3 | 3
Maryana Kvyatkovska (UKR) | 0 | 0
Henna Johansson (SWE) | 0 | 0
Kaori Icho (JPN) | 4 | 3
Gozal Zutova (AZE) | 0 | 1
Ochirbatyn Nasanburmaa (MGL) | 7 | 2
Justine Bouchard (CAN) | 3 | 0 | 1
Marianna Sastin (HUN) | 0 | 3 | 3

Quarterfinals
Chen Meng (CHN) | 0 | 3
Kaori Icho (JPN) | 3 | 4^{F}
Ochirbatyn Nasanburmaa (MGL) | 2 | 0
Marianna Sastin (HUN) | 5 | 3

Semifinals
Kaori Icho (JPN) | 1 | 4
Marianna Sastin (HUN) | 0 | 0

=== Bottom half ===
Round of 32
Hou Min-wen (TPE) | 0 | 1
Sandra Roa (COL) | 1 | 3
Anastasiya Huchok (BLR) | 0
Yvonne Englich (GER) | 4^{F}
Park Sang-eun (KOR) | 4 | 3
Nadia Antar (EGY) | 4 | 0
Lubov Volosova (RUS) | 1 | 2
Elina Vaseva (BUL) | 0 | 1
Simona Corbani (ITA) | 0 | 1 | 3^{F}
Joyce Milazar (MRI) | 1 | 0 | 0
Maminirina Rafaliharisolo (MAD) | 0 | 0
Katerina Vidiaux (CUB) | 7 | 4
María Teresa Méndez (ESP) | 3 | 4
Stephanie Maierhofer (AUT) | 1 | 2
Elena Pirozhkova (USA) | 2^{F}
Tatyana Zakharova (KAZ) | 0

Round of 16
Sandra Roa (COL) | 1 | 1 | 1
Yvonne Englich (GER) | 7 | 0 | 1
Park Sang-eun (KOR) | 0 | 0
Lubov Volosova (RUS) | 3 | 2
Simona Corbani (ITA) | 0 | 1
Katerina Vidiaux (CUB) | 2 | 3
María Teresa Méndez (ESP) | 0 | 0
Elena Pirozhkova (USA) | 1 | 4

Quarterfinals
Sandra Roa (COL) | 1 | 2 | 0
Lubov Volosova (RUS) | 0 | 3 | 1
Katerina Vidiaux (CUB) | 6 | 2 | 1
Elena Pirozhkova (USA) | 0 | 4 | 3

Semifinals
Lubov Volosova (RUS) | 0 | 0
Elena Pirozhkova (USA) | 1 | 1

=== Repechage ===
Repechage round 1
Tatyana Zakharova (KAZ) | 0 | 4^{F}
María Teresa Méndez (ESP) | 6 | 0

Repechage round 2
Henna Johansson (SWE) | 3 | 2
Chen Meng (CHN) | 2 | 1
Tatyana Zakharova (KAZ) | 0
Katerina Vidiaux (CUB) | 7^{F}

Bronze medals
Henna Johansson (SWE) | 1 | 1
Marianna Sastin (HUN) | 0 | 0
Katerina Vidiaux (CUB) | 4 | 1
Lubov Volosova (RUS) | 0 | 4^{F}
