= Wrestling at the 2016 Summer Olympics =

Wrestling at the Games of the XXXI Olympiad
- Venue: Carioca Arena 2
- Dates: 14–21 August 2016
- No. of events: 18
- Competitors: 347 from 66 nations

Wrestling at the 2016 Summer Olympics in Rio de Janeiro took place from 14 to 21 August at the Carioca Arena 2 in Barra da Tijuca. Wrestling had been split into two disciplines, freestyle and Greco-Roman, which were further divided into different weight categories. Men competed in both disciplines whereas women only participated in the freestyle events, with 18 gold medals awarded. Wrestling had been contested at every modern Summer Olympic Games, except Paris 1900.

Around 344 wrestlers competed in 18 events at the 2016 Summer Olympics. In September 2013, a new change to the rules and guidelines of the sport had been instituted and overhauled by the International Olympic Committee and FILA (now known as the United World Wrestling). A single Olympic weight class was removed each from the men's freestyle and Greco-Roman wrestling to add two more weights for the women. Other changes in wrestling at these Games also featured a single-round tournament within a six-minute limit, instead of two-round or tiebreaker.

== Competition format ==
38 men or 18 women competed in each division, plus 6 others allocated either to the host country or by the tripartite commission into divisions yet to be determined prior to the Olympics. Wrestlers determined by lot competed in qualification rounds to reduce the number to 16, thereafter proceeding by simple knockout to determine the finalists who competed for gold and silver. The two groups of wrestlers respectively defeated in the 3 or 4 bouts of the two finalists competed in two serial elimination repechages, with the victor in each repechage being awarded bronze. Coaches were given plush dolls of Vinicius, the Olympic mascot, to throw into the ring when they wished to challenge a call.

== Competition schedule ==
There were two sessions of competition on each day of the 2016 Olympics Wrestling program. Except for the last day, the first session (qualification and elimination) was conducted from 10:00 to 13:00 BRT, and the second session (repechage, bronze medal and gold medal) was conducted from 16:00 to 19:00 BRT. Due to the closing ceremony on the last day (21 Aug) in the evening, the timing for the first and second session were 08:30–11:15 and 12:45–15:15 BRT respectively.

Q	Qualification & elimination	F	Repechage, Bronze medal & Gold medal

Event↓/Date →	Sun 14		Mon 15		Tue 16		Wed 17		Thu 18		Fri 19		Sat 20		Sun 21	
Men's freestyle
Men's freestyle 57 kg											Q	F				
Men's freestyle 65 kg															Q	F
Men's freestyle 74 kg											Q	F				
Men's freestyle 86 kg													Q	F		
Men's freestyle 97 kg															Q	F
Men's freestyle 125 kg													Q	F		
Men's Greco-Roman
Men's Greco-Roman 59 kg	Q	F														
Men's Greco-Roman 66 kg					Q	F										
Men's Greco-Roman 75 kg	Q	F														
Men's Greco-Roman 85 kg			Q	F												
Men's Greco-Roman 98 kg					Q	F										
Men's Greco-Roman 130 kg			Q	F												
Women's freestyle
Women's freestyle 48 kg							Q	F								
Women's freestyle 53 kg									Q	F						
Women's freestyle 58 kg							Q	F								
Women's freestyle 63 kg									Q	F						
Women's freestyle 69 kg							Q	F								
Women's freestyle 75 kg									Q	F						

== Medalists ==
=== Men's freestyle ===
Event	Gold	Silver	Bronze
57 kg	Vladimer Khinchegashvili; Georgia	Rei Higuchi; Japan	Haji Aliyev; Azerbaijan
57 kg	Vladimer Khinchegashvili; Georgia	Rei Higuchi; Japan	Hassan Rahimi; Iran
65 kg	Soslan Ramonov; Russia	Toghrul Asgarov; Azerbaijan	Frank Chamizo; Italy
65 kg	Soslan Ramonov; Russia	Toghrul Asgarov; Azerbaijan	Ikhtiyor Navruzov; Uzbekistan
74 kg	Hassan Yazdani; Iran	Aniuar Geduev; Russia	Jabrayil Hasanov; Azerbaijan
74 kg	Hassan Yazdani; Iran	Aniuar Geduev; Russia	Soner Demirtaş; Turkey
86 kg	Abdulrashid Sadulaev; Russia	Selim Yaşar; Turkey	Sharif Sharifov; Azerbaijan
86 kg	Abdulrashid Sadulaev; Russia	Selim Yaşar; Turkey	J'den Cox; United States
97 kg	Kyle Snyder; United States	Khetag Gazyumov; Azerbaijan	Albert Saritov; Romania
97 kg	Kyle Snyder; United States	Khetag Gazyumov; Azerbaijan	Magomed Ibragimov; Uzbekistan
125 kg	Taha Akgül; Turkey	Komeil Ghasemi; Iran	Ibrahim Saidau; Belarus
125 kg	Taha Akgül; Turkey	Komeil Ghasemi; Iran	Geno Petriashvili; Georgia

=== Men's Greco-Roman ===
Event	Gold	Silver	Bronze
59 kg	Ismael Borrero; Cuba	Shinobu Ota; Japan	Elmurat Tasmuradov; Uzbekistan
59 kg	Ismael Borrero; Cuba	Shinobu Ota; Japan	Stig-André Berge; Norway
66 kg	Davor Štefanek; Serbia	Mihran Harutyunyan; Armenia	Shmagi Bolkvadze; Georgia
66 kg	Davor Štefanek; Serbia	Mihran Harutyunyan; Armenia	Rasul Chunayev; Azerbaijan
75 kg	Roman Vlasov; Russia	Mark Madsen; Denmark	Kim Hyeon-woo; South Korea
75 kg	Roman Vlasov; Russia	Mark Madsen; Denmark	Saeid Abdevali; Iran
85 kg	Davit Chakvetadze; Russia	Zhan Beleniuk; Ukraine	Javid Hamzatau; Belarus
85 kg	Davit Chakvetadze; Russia	Zhan Beleniuk; Ukraine	Denis Kudla; Germany
98 kg	Artur Aleksanyan; Armenia	Yasmany Lugo; Cuba	Cenk İldem; Turkey
98 kg	Artur Aleksanyan; Armenia	Yasmany Lugo; Cuba	Ghasem Rezaei; Iran
130 kg	Mijaín López; Cuba	Rıza Kayaalp; Turkey	Sabah Shariati; Azerbaijan
130 kg	Mijaín López; Cuba	Rıza Kayaalp; Turkey	Sergey Semenov; Russia

=== Women's freestyle ===
Event	Gold	Silver	Bronze
48 kg	Eri Tosaka; Japan	Mariya Stadnik; Azerbaijan	Sun Yanan; China
48 kg	Eri Tosaka; Japan	Mariya Stadnik; Azerbaijan	Elitsa Yankova; Bulgaria
53 kg	Helen Maroulis; United States	Saori Yoshida; Japan	Nataliya Synyshyn; Azerbaijan
53 kg	Helen Maroulis; United States	Saori Yoshida; Japan	Sofia Mattsson; Sweden
58 kg	Kaori Icho; Japan	Valeria Koblova; Russia	Marwa Amri; Tunisia
58 kg	Kaori Icho; Japan	Valeria Koblova; Russia	Sakshi Malik; India
63 kg	Risako Kawai; Japan	Maryia Mamashuk; Belarus	Yekaterina Larionova; Kazakhstan
63 kg	Risako Kawai; Japan	Maryia Mamashuk; Belarus	Monika Michalik; Poland
69 kg	Sara Dosho; Japan	Natalia Vorobieva; Russia	Elmira Syzdykova; Kazakhstan
69 kg	Sara Dosho; Japan	Natalia Vorobieva; Russia	Jenny Fransson; Sweden
75 kg	Erica Wiebe; Canada	Guzel Manyurova; Kazakhstan	Zhang Fengliu; China
75 kg	Erica Wiebe; Canada	Guzel Manyurova; Kazakhstan	Ekaterina Bukina; Russia

== Medal table ==
Rank	Nation	Gold	Silver	Bronze	Total
1	Russia	4	3	2	9
2	Japan	4	3	0	7
3	Cuba	2	1	0	3
4	United States	2	0	1	3
5	Turkey	1	2	2	5
6	Iran	1	1	3	5
7	Armenia	1	1	0	2
8	Georgia	1	0	2	3
9	Canada	1	0	0	1
9	Serbia	1	0	0	1
11	Azerbaijan	0	3	6	9
12	Belarus	0	1	2	3
12	Kazakhstan	0	1	2	3
14	Denmark	0	1	0	1
14	Ukraine	0	1	0	1
16	Uzbekistan	0	0	3	3
17	China	0	0	2	2
17	Sweden	0	0	2	2
19	Bulgaria	0	0	1	1
19	Germany	0	0	1	1
19	India	0	0	1	1
19	Italy	0	0	1	1
19	Norway	0	0	1	1
19	Poland	0	0	1	1
19	Romania	0	0	1	1
19	South Korea	0	0	1	1
19	Tunisia	0	0	1	1
Totals (27 entries)		18	18	36	72

== Participation ==
=== Participating nations ===
- Algeria (3)
- Argentina (1)
- Armenia (8)
- Australia (3)
- Austria (1)
- Azerbaijan (14)
- Bahrain (1)
- Belarus (8)
- Brazil (5)
- Bulgaria (11)
- Cambodia (1)
- Cameroon (3)
- Canada (8)
- China (13)
- Chinese Taipei (1)
- Colombia (5)
- Croatia (1)
- Cuba (10)
- Czech Republic (1)
- Denmark (1)
- Ecuador (2)
- Egypt (10)
- Estonia (3)
- Finland (3)
- France (2)
- Georgia (11)
- Germany (7)
- Greece (1)
- Guinea-Bissau (2)
- Haiti (1)
- Hungary (8)
- India (8)
- Iran (12)
- Israel (1)
- Italy (2)
- Japan (10)
- Kazakhstan (12)
- Kyrgyzstan (7)
- Latvia (1)
- Lithuania (1)
- Mexico (1)
- Moldova (3)
- Mongolia (10)
- Morocco (3)
- Netherlands (1)
- Nigeria (7)
- North Korea (4)
- Norway (2)
- Palau (1)
- Peru (1)
- Poland (8)
- Puerto Rico (2)
- Romania (5)
- Russia (17)
- Senegal (2)
- Serbia (3)
- South Korea (5)
- Spain (1)
- Sweden (7)
- Tunisia (4)
- Turkey (14)
- Ukraine (11)
- United States (14)
- Uzbekistan (8)
- Venezuela (9)
- Vietnam (1)

=== Official referees ===
This is the official list of referees from 2016 Summer Olympics:

- (Germany) Antonio Silvestri (Chief of the Refereeing Commission)
- (Cuba) Guillermo Molina (Instructor)
- (Italy) Edit Dozsa (Instructor)
- (Japan) Osamu Saito (Instructor)
- (Russia) Andrey Krikov (Instructor)
- (Tunisia) Kamel Mohamed Bouaziz (Instructor)
- (Turkey) Halil İbrahim Cicioğlu (Instructor)
- (United States) Zach Errett (Instructor)
- (Uzbekistan) Konstantin Mikhaylov (Instructor)
- (Finland) Pertti Vehviläinen (Supervisor)
- (France) Régine Legleut (Supervisor)
- (Georgia (country)) Edisher Machaidze (Supervisor)
- (Kazakhstan) Bakhytzhan Jaxykulov (Supervisor)
- (Morocco) Noreddine Mochaffaa (Supervisor)
- (Russia) Sergey Novakovskiy (Supervisor)
