= Wrestling at the 2015 Pan American Games – Women's freestyle 63 kg =

Women's Freestyle 63 kg at the 2015 Pan American Games
- Venue: Mississauga Sports Centre
- Dates: July 17
- Competitors: 8 from 8 nations

Medalists
Gold medal	Braxton Stone-Papadopoulos; Canada
Silver medal	Katerina Vidiaux; Cuba
Bronze medal	Jackeline Rentería; Colombia
Bronze medal	Erin Clodgo; United States

The women's freestyle 63 kg competition of the wrestling events at the 2015 Pan American Games in Toronto were held on July 17 at the Mississauga Sports Centre.

Braxton Stone-Papadopoulos of Canada won the gold medal.

== Schedule ==
All times are Eastern Daylight Time (UTC-4).

Date	Time	Round
July 17, 2015	15:02	Quarterfinals
July 17, 2015	16:05	Semifinals
July 17, 2015	20:00	Bronze medal matches
July 17, 2015	20:18	Final

== Results ==
- F — Won by fall
- R - Retired
- WO - Won by Walkover

=== Final ===
Quarterfinals		Semifinals		Finals
Braxton Stone-Papadopoulos (CAN)	10
Jessica Olivares (PER)	0	Braxton Stone-Papadopoulos (CAN)	6
Jackeline Rentería (COL)	11^{F}	Jackeline Rentería (COL)	5
Nathaly Grimán (VEN)	6			Braxton Stone-Papadopoulos (CAN)	7
Erin Clodgo (USA)	7			Katerina Vidiaux (CUB)	3
Katerina Vidiaux (CUB)	11	Katerina Vidiaux (CUB)	8
Dennisse Antes (ECU)	WO	Dennisse Antes (ECU)	2^{R}
Stephanie Bragayrac (PAR)

=== Repechage ===
Bronze medal match
Jessica Olivares (PER)	5
Jackeline Rentería (COL)	8
Erin Clodgo (USA)	WO
Dennisse Antes (ECU)

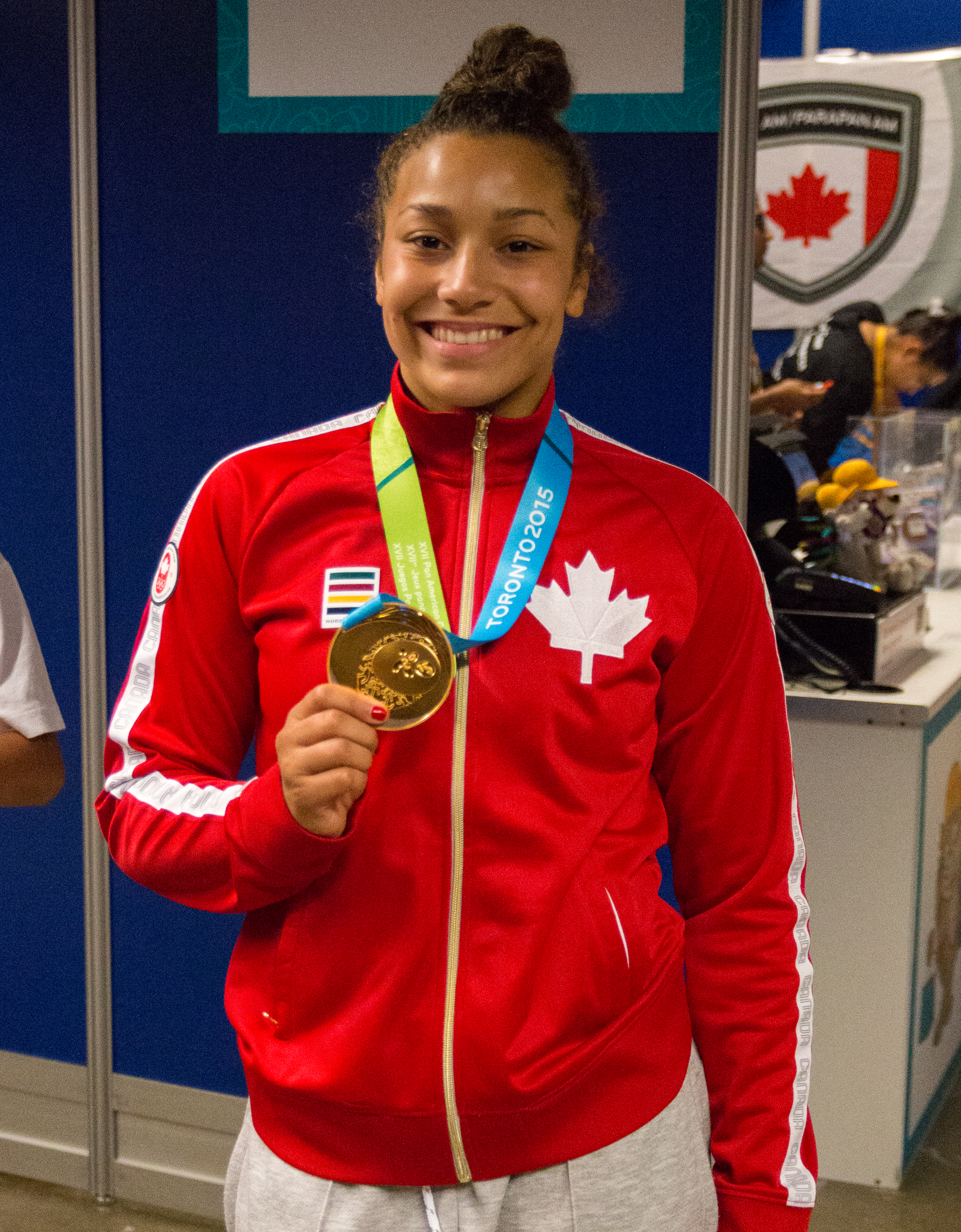
Braxton Stone won gold in the women's 63 kg freestyle event
