= 2010 World Wrestling Championships – Women's freestyle 59 kg =

Women's wrestling competition

Women's freestyle 59 kg at the 2010 World Championships
- Venue: Olympic Stadium
- Dates: 9 September 2010
- Competitors: 22 from 22 nations

Medalists
gold medal	Soronzonboldyn Battsetseg	Mongolia
silver medal	Zhang Lan	China
bronze medal	Ayako Shoda	Japan
bronze medal	Johanna Mattsson	Sweden

The women's freestyle 59 kilograms is a competition featured at the 2010 World Wrestling Championships, and was held at the Olympic Stadium in Moscow, Russia on 9 September.

This freestyle wrestling competition consists of a single-elimination tournament, with a repechage used to determine the winner of two bronze medals.

== Results ==
Legend

- F — Won by fall

=== Final ===
Final
Soronzonboldyn Battsetseg (MGL)	4	4
Zhang Lan (CHN)	0	0

=== Top half ===
Round of 32

Round of 16
Ayako Shoda (JPN)	1	3	2
Sona Ahmadli (AZE)	0	4	1
Meryem Selloum (FRA)	0	0
Olga Kalinina (KAZ)	4	3^{F}
Tonya Verbeek (CAN)	1	4
Soronzonboldyn Battsetseg (MGL)	2	8
Ekaterina Viunova (RUS)	3	0	0
Joice Silva (BRA)	0	1	1

Quarterfinals
Ayako Shoda (JPN)	4	1
Olga Kalinina (KAZ)	2	0
Soronzonboldyn Battsetseg (MGL)	4^{F}
Joice Silva (BRA)	0

Semifinals
Ayako Shoda (JPN)	2	3	3
Soronzonboldyn Battsetseg (MGL)	0	3	5

=== Bottom half ===
Round of 32
Georgiana Paic (ROU)	1	0	0
Alka Tomar (IND)	0	1	2
Nataliya Synyshyn (UKR)	0	0
Johanna Mattsson (SWE)	1	4
Kelsey Campbell (USA)	1	2	1
Ludmila Cristea (MDA)	0	3	0
Blessing Oborududu (NGR)	4	3
Taybe Yusein (BUL)	0	1
Aurora Fajardo (ESP)	1	2	1
Nestan Kiiazova (KGZ)	0	4	0
Laura Skujiņa (LAT)	0	1	1
Jacira Mendonca (GBS)	2	0	0

Round of 16
Alena Filipava (BLR)	0	0
Zhang Lan (CHN)	7	3
Alka Tomar (IND)	3	0	0
Johanna Mattsson (SWE)	0	2	5
Kelsey Campbell (USA)	0	4^{F}
Blessing Oborududu (NGR)	1	0
Aurora Fajardo (ESP)	0	0
Laura Skujiņa (LAT)	1	3

Quarterfinals
Zhang Lan (CHN)	1	2
Johanna Mattsson (SWE)	0	0
Kelsey Campbell (USA)	0	2	3
Laura Skujiņa (LAT)	1	0	0

Semifinals
Zhang Lan (CHN)	1	4^{F}
Kelsey Campbell (USA)	0	0

=== Repechage ===
Repechage round 2
Tonya Verbeek (CAN)	3	7
Joice Silva (BRA)	0	1
Alena Filipava (BLR)	1	0
Johanna Mattsson (SWE)	1	1

Bronze medals
Tonya Verbeek (CAN)	0	1
Ayako Shoda (JPN)	1	1
Johanna Mattsson (SWE)	4^{F}
Kelsey Campbell (USA)	0
