= Nathaly Grimán =

Venezuelan freestyle wrestler

Personal information
- Full name: Nathaly Josefina Grimán Herrera
- Born: 29 December 1991 (age 34)

Sport
- Country: Venezuela
- Sport: Amateur wrestling
- Weight class: 62 kg
- Event: Freestyle
Medal record
Representing Venezuela
Women's freestyle wrestling
Pan American Championships
Silver medal – second place	2023 Buenos Aires	62 kg
Bronze medal – third place	2014 Mexico City	63 kg
Bronze medal – third place	2015 Santiago	63 kg
Bronze medal – third place	2017 Lauro de Freitas	63 kg
Bronze medal – third place	2019 Buenos Aires	62 kg
Central American and Caribbean Games
Gold medal – first place	2018 Barranquilla	62 kg
Gold medal – first place	2026 Santo Domingo	68 kg
South American Games
Silver medal – second place	2018 Cochabamba	62 kg
Silver medal – second place	2022 Asunción	62 kg
Bolivarian Games
Gold medal – first place	2017 Santa Marta	63 kg
Gold medal – first place	2022 Valledupar	62 kg
Women's beach wrestling
Central American and Caribbean Beach Games
Gold medal – first place	2022 Santa Marta	70 kg

Nathaly Josefina Grimán Herrera (Note: In this Spanish name, the first or paternal surname is Grimán and the second or maternal family name is Herrera.) (born 29 December 1991) is a Venezuelan freestyle wrestler. She is a gold medalist at the Central American and Caribbean Games and a two-time gold medalist at the Bolivarian Games. She is also a five-time medalist at the Pan American Wrestling Championships.

== Career ==
Grimán competed in the women's 63 kg event at the 2013 World Wrestling Championships held in Budapest, Hungary. She won one of the bronze medals in the women's 63 kg event at the 2014 Pan American Wrestling Championships held in Mexico City, Mexico.

Grimán also won one of the bronze medals in the same event at the 2015 Pan American Wrestling Championships held in Santiago, Chile. A few months later, she competed in her event at the 2015 Pan American Games held in Toronto, Canada. She was eliminated in her first match by eventual bronze medalist Jackeline Rentería of Colombia. In that same year, she competed in the 63 kg event at the 2015 World Wrestling Championships held in Las Vegas, United States where she was also eliminated in her first match.

Grimán competed at the 2016 Pan American Olympic Qualification Tournament hoping to qualify for the 2016 Summer Olympics held in Rio de Janeiro, Brazil. She did not qualify for the Olympics at this tournament. She also competed at the first and second World Olympic Qualification Tournaments. She was eliminated in her first match at the tournament held in Ulaanbaatar, Mongolia. She came close to qualifying for the Olympics at the second tournament held in Istanbul, Turkey: she reached the semifinals where she lost against Henna Johansson of Sweden.

She won one of the bronze medals in the women's 63 kg event at the 2017 Pan American Wrestling Championships held in Lauro de Freitas, Brazil. In that same year, she won the gold medal in her event at the 2017 Bolivarian Games held in Santa Marta, Colombia. She defeated Jackeline Rentería of Colombia in her gold medal match.

In 2018, Grimán won the silver medal in the women's 62 kg event at the South American Games held in Cochabamba, Bolivia. At the 2018 Central American and Caribbean Games held in Barranquilla, Colombia, she won the gold medal in the women's 62 kg event. She was eliminated in her first match in the women's 62 kg event at the 2018 World Wrestling Championships held in Budapest, Hungary.

At the 2019 Pan American Wrestling Championships held in Buenos Aires, Argentina, Grimán won one of the bronze medals in the women's 62 kg event. A few months later, she lost her bronze medal match against Laís Nunes of Brazil in the women's 62 kg event at the 2019 Pan American Games held in Lima, Peru. At the 2019 World Wrestling Championships held in Nur-Sultan, Kazakhstan, she was eliminated in her second match by Mariana Cherdivara of Moldova.

Grimán competed at the 2020 Pan American Olympic Qualification Tournament held in Ottawa, Canada, hoping to qualify for the 2020 Summer Olympics in Tokyo, Japan. She did not qualify at this tournament and she also failed to qualify for the Olympics at the World Olympic Qualification Tournament held in Sofia, Bulgaria. She won the silver medal in her event at the 2021 Dan Kolov & Nikola Petrov Tournament held in Plovdiv, Bulgaria.

Grimán won the gold medal in the women's 62 kg event at the 2022 Bolivarian Games held in Valledupar, Colombia. She defeated Leonela Ayoví of Ecuador in her gold medal match. She won the silver medal in her event at the 2022 South American Games held in Asunción, Paraguay.

Grimán won the silver medal in her event at the 2023 Pan American Wrestling Championships held in Buenos Aires, Argentina.

== Achievements ==
Year	Tournament	Location	Result	Event
2014	Pan American Wrestling Championships	Mexico City, Mexico	3rd	Freestyle 63 kg
2015	Pan American Wrestling Championships	Santiago, Chile	3rd	Freestyle 63 kg
2017	Pan American Wrestling Championships	Lauro de Freitas, Brazil	3rd	Freestyle 63 kg
2017	Bolivarian Games	Santa Marta, Colombia	1st	Freestyle 63 kg
2018	South American Games	Cochabamba, Bolivia	2nd	Freestyle 62 kg
2018	Central American and Caribbean Games	Barranquilla, Colombia	1st	Freestyle 62 kg
2019	Pan American Wrestling Championships	Buenos Aires, Argentina	3rd	Freestyle 62 kg
2022	Bolivarian Games	Valledupar, Colombia	1st	Freestyle 62 kg
2022	South American Games	Asunción, Paraguay	2nd	Freestyle 62 kg
2022	Central American and Caribbean Beach Games	Santa Marta, Colombia	1st	Beach wrestling 70 kg
2023	Pan American Wrestling Championships	Buenos Aires, Argentina	2nd	Freestyle 62 kg
