= Wrestling at the 2016 Summer Olympics – Women's freestyle 63 kg =

Women's freestyle 63 kg at the Games of the XXXI Olympiad
- Venue: Carioca Arena 2
- Date: 18 August 2016
- Competitors: 19 from 19 nations

Medalists
1st place, gold medalist(s)		Risako Kawai	Japan
2nd place, silver medalist(s)		Maryia Mamashuk	Belarus
3rd place, bronze medalist(s)		Yekaterina Larionova	Kazakhstan
3rd place, bronze medalist(s)		Monika Michalik	Poland

Women's freestyle 63 kilograms competition at the 2016 Summer Olympics in Rio de Janeiro, Brazil, took place on August 18 at the Carioca Arena 2 in Barra da Tijuca.

This freestyle wrestling competition consists of a single-elimination tournament, with a repechage used to determine the winner of two bronze medals. The two finalists face off for gold and silver medals. Each wrestler who loses to one of the two finalists moves into the repechage, culminating in a pair of bronze medal matches featuring the semifinal losers each facing the remaining repechage opponent from their half of the bracket.

== Schedule ==
All times are Brasília Standard Time (UTC−03:00)

Date	Time	Event
18 August 2016	10:00	Qualification rounds
18 August 2016	16:00	Repechage
18 August 2016	17:00	Finals

== Results ==
Legend

- F — Won by fall
- R — Retired

=== Final ===
Final
Maryia Mamashuk (BLR)	0
Risako Kawai (JPN)	6

=== Top half ===
Qualifications

1/8 finals
Soronzonboldyn Battsetseg (MGL)	1
Blessing Oborududu (NGR)	1
Elena Pirozhkova (USA)	10
Taybe Yusein (BUL)	7
Yekaterina Larionova (KAZ)	2
Maryia Mamashuk (BLR)	8
Henna Johansson (SWE)	11
Adéla Hanzlíčková (CZE)	0

1/4 finals
Soronzonboldyn Battsetseg (MGL)	2
Elena Pirozhkova (USA)	3
Maryia Mamashuk (BLR)	7
Henna Johansson (SWE)	2

Semifinals
Elena Pirozhkova (USA)	2
Maryia Mamashuk (BLR)	3

=== Bottom half ===
Qualifications
Yuliya Tkach (UKR)	2
Danielle Lappage (CAN)	0^{R}
Inna Trazhukova (RUS)	3
Marianna Sastin (HUN)	0
Laís Nunes (BRA)	5
Hafize Şahin (TUR)	2^{F}

1/8 finals
Risako Kawai (JPN)	5
Monika Michalik (POL)	0
Hela Riabi (TUN)	0
Anastasija Grigorjeva (LAT)	10
Xu Rui (CHN)	3
Yuliya Tkach (UKR)	1
Inna Trazhukova (RUS)	9
Hafize Şahin (TUR)	5

1/4 finals
Risako Kawai (JPN)	8
Anastasija Grigorjeva (LAT)	2
Xu Rui (CHN)	4
Inna Trazhukova (RUS)	5

Semifinals
Risako Kawai (JPN)	10
Inna Trazhukova (RUS)	0

=== Repechage ===
Repechage round 2
Yekaterina Larionova (KAZ)	4^{F}
Henna Johansson (SWE)	1
Monika Michalik (POL)	5
Anastasija Grigorjeva (LAT)	2

Bronze medals
Yekaterina Larionova (KAZ)	4^{F}
Elena Pirozhkova (USA)	3
Monika Michalik (POL)	6
Inna Trazhukova (RUS)	3

== Final standing ==
Rank	Athlete
1st place, gold medalist(s)	Risako Kawai (JPN)
2nd place, silver medalist(s)	Maryia Mamashuk (BLR)
3rd place, bronze medalist(s)	Yekaterina Larionova (KAZ)
3rd place, bronze medalist(s)	Monika Michalik (POL)
5	Elena Pirozhkova (USA)
5	Inna Trazhukova (RUS)
7	Hafize Şahin (TUR)
8	Anastasija Grigorjeva (LAT)
9	Yuliya Tkach (UKR)
10	Henna Johansson (SWE)
11	Xu Rui (CHN)
12	Soronzonboldyn Battsetseg (MGL)
13	Taybe Yusein (BUL)
14	Blessing Oborududu (NGR)
15	Laís Nunes (BRA)
16	Danielle Lappage (CAN)
17	Marianna Sastin (HUN)
18	Hela Riabi (TUN)
19	Adéla Hanzlíčková (CZE)
