= Xu Rui =

Chinese freestyle wrestler

Personal information
- Born: June 6, 1995 (age 31)

Sport
- Country: China
- Sport: Freestyle wrestling

Xu Rui (born June 6, 1995) is a Chinese freestyle wrestler. She competed in the women's freestyle 63 kg event at the 2016 Summer Olympics, in which she was eliminated in the quarterfinals by Inna Trazhukova.
