= Jacira Mendonca =

Jacira Mendonça
Personal information
- Nationality: Guinea-Bissau
- Born: 7 January 1986 (age 40) Bissau, Guinea-Bissau
- Height: 1.59 m (5 ft 3 in)
- Weight: 63 kg (139 lb)

Sport
- Sport: Wrestling
- Event: Freestyle
Medal record
Representing Guinea-Bissau
Women's Freestyle wrestling
African Championships
Gold medal – first place	2011 Dakar	59 kg
Gold medal – first place	2012 Marrakesh	63 kg
Bronze medal – third place	2014 Tunis	63 kg
- Updated on 26 March 2019

Jacira Francisco Mendonca (born 7 January 1986 in Bissau) is a female competition wrestler from Guinea-Bissau. She represented Guinea-Bissau in the 2012 Summer Olympics in London, United Kingdom.

== Major results ==
Year	Tournament	Venue	Result	Event
2010	World Championships	Moscow, Russia	17th	59 kg
2011	African Championships	Dakar, Senegal	1st	59 kg
2011	World Championships	Istanbul, Turkey	35th	63 kg
2012	African Championships	Marrakesh, Morocco	1st	63 kg
2012	Olympic Games	(United Kingdom) London, Great Britain	17th	63 kg
2014	African Championships	Tunis, Tunisia	3rd	63 kg
2014	World Championships	Tashkent, Uzbekistan	15th	63 kg
