= Braxton Stone-Papadopoulos =

Canadian freestyle wrestler

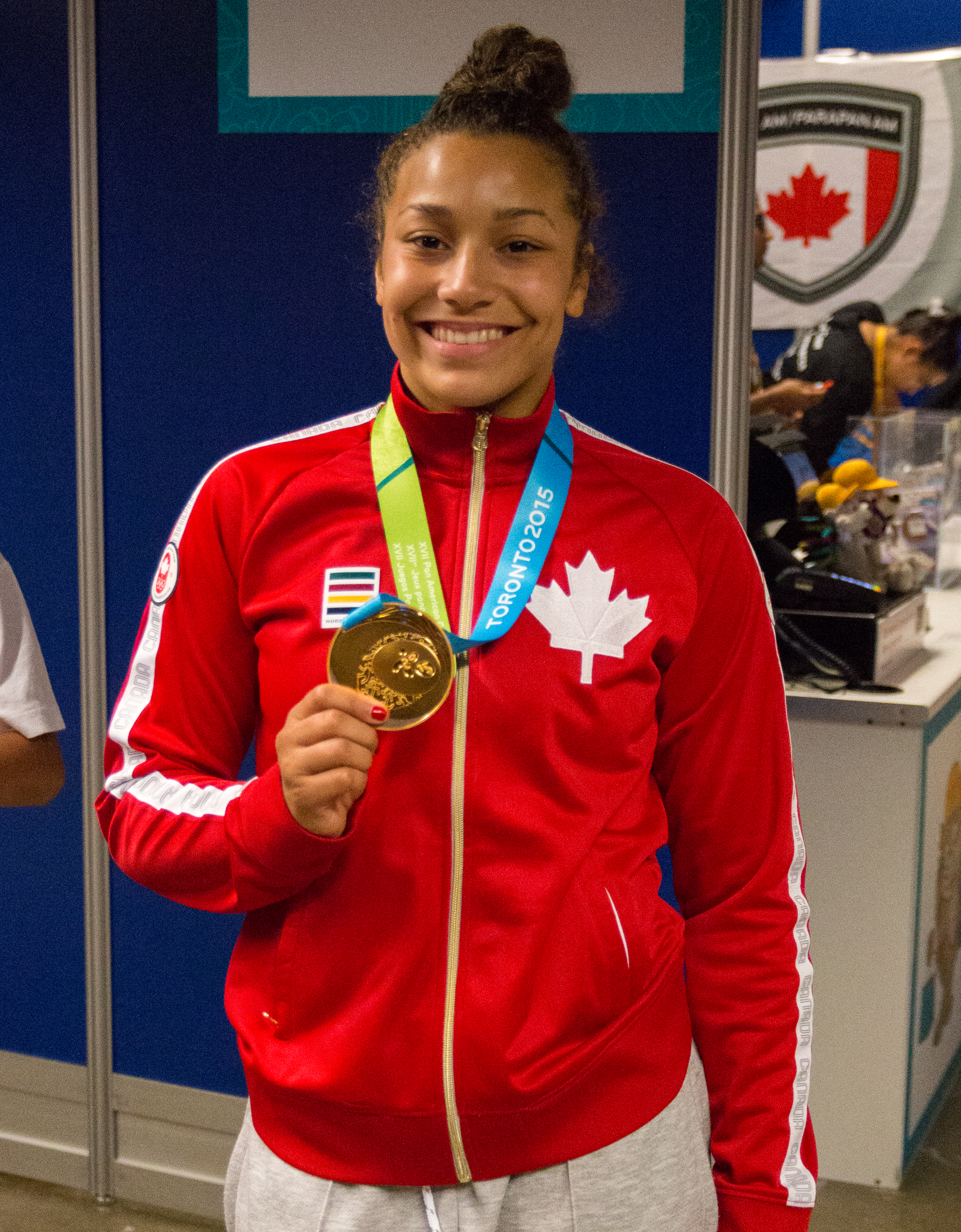
- Stone-Papadopoulos at 2015 Pan Am Games showing her gold medal

Personal information
- Full name: Braxton Rei Stone-Papadopoulos
- Born: 23 June 1995 (age 31) Scarborough, Ontario, Canada
- Home town: Pickering, Ontario, Canada
- Height: 170 cm (5 ft 7 in)
- Weight: 63 kg (139 lb)

Sport
- Sport: Freestyle wrestling
- Club: Team Impact Wrestling Club

Achievements and titles
- Highest world ranking: 2
Medal record
Women's freestyle wrestling
Representing Canada
Pan American Games
Gold medal – first place	2015 Toronto	63 kg
World U23 Championships
Bronze medal – third place	2017 Bydgoszcz	58 kg
Commonwealth Games
Bronze medal – third place	2014 Glasgow	58 kg
World Junior Wrestling Championships
Silver medal – second place	2013 Bulgaria	58 kg
Bronze medal – third place	2015 Brazil	63 kg

Braxton Stone-Papadopoulos (born 23 June 1995) is a Canadian wrestler. She won a bronze medal at the 2014 Commonwealth Games. She has been in competition with fellow world champion teammate Justine Bouchard. She has been ranked number 2 in the world.

== Early life ==
She initially earned a black belt in taekwondo by age 10. She started wrestling at age 10 and was coached initially by her uncle Stan Tzogas who had coached at the Olympic level.

== Career ==
She won the bronze medal at the 2014 Commonwealth Games. Following the games, she made the decision to move up a weight class to 63-kg after she experienced difficulty reaching the 58-kg weight limit.

At the 2015 Pan American Games she won the gold medal in 63 kg category, defeating Katerina Vidiaux of Cuba 7–3.

In September 2015 Stone-Papadopoulos qualified a quota for Canada for the 2016 Olympic Games in Rio de Janeiro after placing fifth in the 63 kg category at the senior world championships. Ultimately, she was not selected to compete for the country at the 2016 Games.

In 2017, she won a silver medal at the 2017 World U23 Wrestling Championship in the 63 kg category. She defeated Petra Olli, Germany's Luzie Manzke and Moa Nygren of Sweden en route to the gold medal match, where she lost due to a last-moment throw by the winner, Ayana Gempei of Japan.
