= Henna Johansson =

Swedish freestyle wrestler (born 1991)

Personal information
- Full name: Henna Katarina Johansson
- Born: 1 May 1991 (age 35) Gällivare, Sweden
- Height: 164 cm (5 ft 5 in)

Sport
- Sport: Wrestling
- Weight class: 62–67 kg (137–148 lb)
Medal record
Women's freestyle wrestling
Representing Sweden
World Championships
Bronze medal – third place	2010 Moscow	63 kg
Bronze medal – third place	2019 Nur-Sultan	62 kg
European Championships
Gold medal – first place	2012 Belgrade	67 kg
Bronze medal – third place	2018 Kaspiysk	65 kg
Bronze medal – third place	2009 Vilnius	63 kg

Henna Katarina Johansson (born 1 May 1991) is a Swedish wrestler.

She competed at the 2012 Summer Olympics in the 63 kg weight class, winning her first round match against Aisuluu Tynybekova of Kyrgyzstan but lost her quarterfinal match against Kaori Icho of Japan. She finished 10th after losing to Martine Dugrenier of Canada in Repechage round 2.

She competed in the 63 kg weight class at the 2016 Summer Olympics, where she won her first match against Adéla Hanzlíčková of the Czech Republic and lost her quarterfinal match against Maryia Mamashuk of Belarus. She again finished 10th after losing to Yekaterina Larionova of Kazakhstan in her Repechage round 2 match.

In 2021, she won the gold medal in her event at the 2021 Poland Open held in Warsaw, Poland.

She represented Sweden at the 2020 Summer Olympics in Tokyo, Japan. She competed in the women's freestyle 62 kg event.
