= Kelsey Campbell =

American freestyle wrestler

Kelsey Campbell (born June 5, 1985, in Anchorage) of Colorado Springs, Colorado is an American Olympic Wrestler who won the 2012 at 55 kg FS and 2016 U.S. Olympic Trials at 57 kg FS and competed at the 2012 Olympics. She is an actress represented by South West Artists Group, musician, author, and owns the non-Profit Repurposed by Kelsey LLC

== Career ==
Kelsey started wrestling in response to a bet that she could not handle being a wrestler.

=== Pac-12 ===
Kelsey attended and was the first female to wrestler to sign to Arizona State University.

=== USA Wrestling ===
Kelsey defeated Helen Maroulis 2 to 0 at the finals of the 2012 U.S. Olympic Trials.

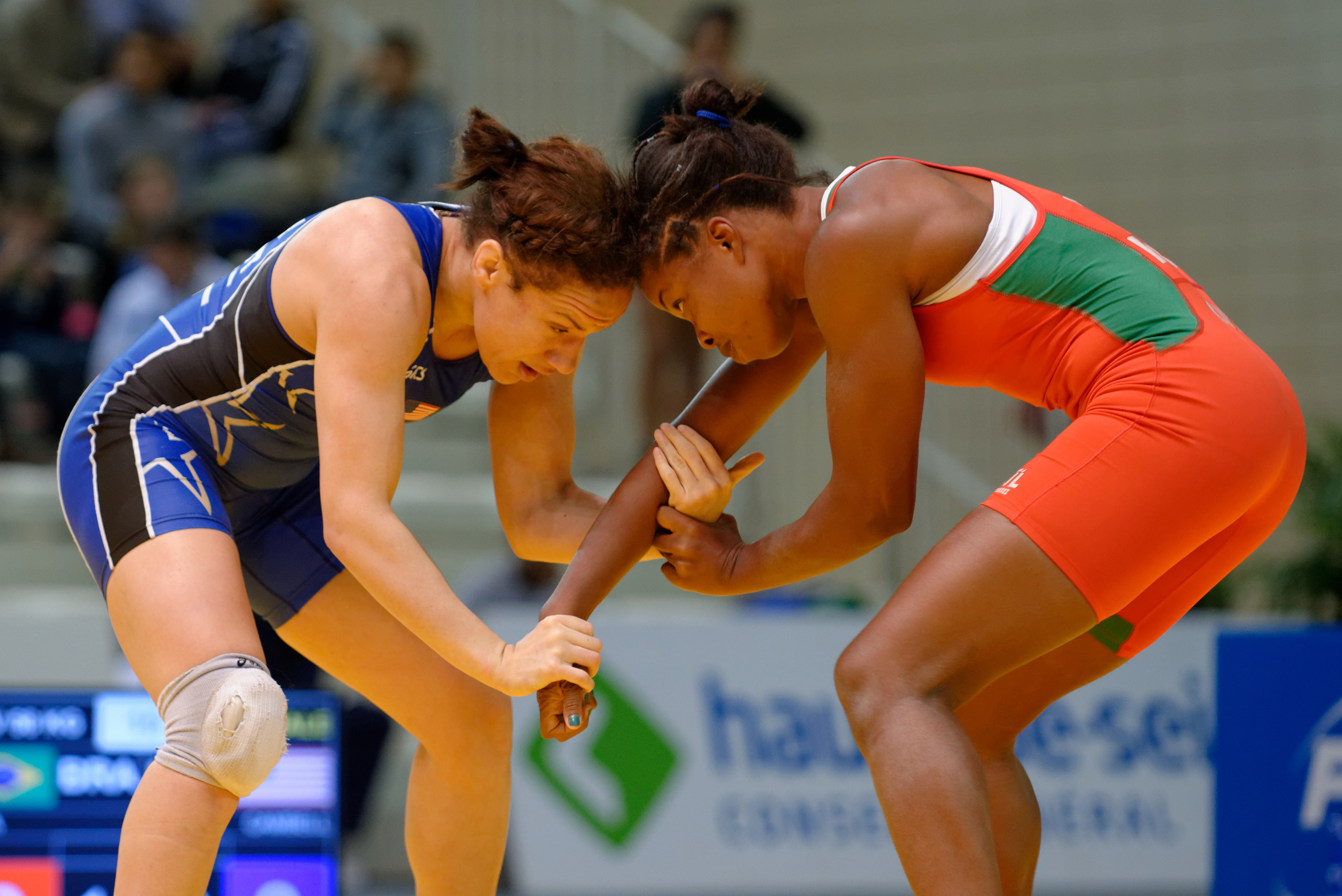
Joice Silva (red) wrestles Kelsey Campbell (blue) in quarter-finals of the 58kg freestyle wrestling at the Golden Grand Prix of Paris on 8 February 2014.

=== Olympic ===
In her opening match Campbell lost 1-0, 1-0 to eventual gold medalist Saori Yoshida and in the Repechage round 2 lost to eventual bronze medalist Yuliya Ratkevich 4-0, 1-0.
