= Hela Riabi =

Tunisian freestyle wrestler

Personal information
- Nationality: Tunisia
- Born: 18 February 1987 (age 39)
- Height: 165 cm (5 ft 5 in)
- Weight: 63 kg (139 lb)

Sport
- Sport: Freestyle Wrestling
Medal record
Women's freestyle wrestling
Representing Tunisia
African Games
| Gold medal – first place | 2015 Brazzaville | 60 kg |
- Updated on 25 August 2016

Hela Riabi (born 18 February 1987) is a Tunisian freestyle wrestler. At the 2016 Summer Olympics she competed in the Women's freestyle -63 kg.
