= Soronzonboldyn Battsetseg =

Mongolian freestyle wrestler

Personal information
- Native name: Соронзонболдын Батцэцэг
- Nickname: Golden Girl
- Nationality: Mongolian
- Born: 3 May 1990 (age 36) Khashaat, Arkhangai, Mongolia
- Height: 1.70 m (5 ft 7 in)

Sport
- Country: Mongolia
- Sport: Wrestling
- Weight class: 68 kg
- Event: Freestyle

Achievements and titles
- Olympic finals: (bronze) (2012) 5th (2020)
- World finals: (gold) (2010) (gold) (2015); (silver) (2013) (bronze) (2019)
- Regional finals: (gold) (2017) (silver) (2010)
Medal record
Women's freestyle wrestling
Representing Mongolia
Olympic Games
Bronze medal – third place	2012 London	63 kg
World Championships
Gold medal – first place	2010 Moscow	59 kg
Gold medal – first place	2015 Las Vegas	63 kg
Silver medal – second place	2013 Budapest	63 kg
Bronze medal – third place	2019 Nur-Sultan	68 kg
World Cup
Silver medal – second place	2013 Ulaanbaatar	63 kg
Bronze medal – third place	2015 Saint Petersburg	63 kg
Bronze medal – third place	2017 Cheboksary	69 kg
Bronze medal – third place	2018 Takasaki	65 kg
Asian Championships
Gold medal – first place	2017 New Delhi	63 kg
Silver medal – second place	2010 New Delhi	59 kg
Golden Grand Prix Ivan Yarygin
Gold medal – first place	2015 Krasnoyarsk	63 kg
Summer Universiade
Gold medal – first place	2013 Kazan	63 kg

Soronzonboldyn Battsetseg (Mongolian: Соронзонболдын Батцэцэг, born 3 May 1990) is Mongolia's first female gold medalist of the World Wrestling Championships. At the 2012 Olympic Games in London, she won bronze in women's 63 kg freestyle. It was Mongolia's first medal in freestyle wrestling since the 1980 Summer Olympics. Battsetseg was the youngest ever world wrestling champion of Mongolia when she won in 2010 at the age of 20 years. Now Sükheegiin Tserenchimed is the youngest champion of Mongolia. She is a recipient of the Hero of Labour of Mongolia and the Order of Sukhbaatar.
