= Elena Pirozhkova =

American sport wrestler (born 1986)

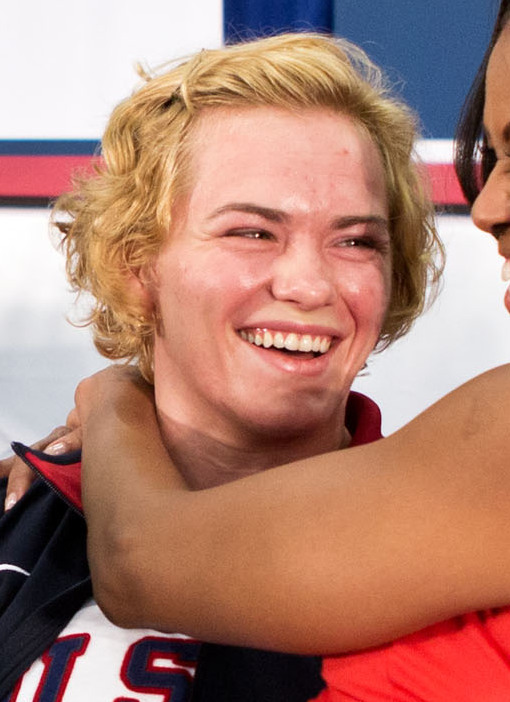
- Pirozkhova greeting Michelle Obama in 2012

Personal information
- Born: October 13, 1986 (age 39) Novokuznetsk, Kemerovo Oblast, Soviet Union
- Home town: Greenfield, Massachusetts, U.S.
- Height: 5 ft 5 in (165 cm)

Sport
- Country: United States
- Sport: Wrestling
- Event: Freestyle
- Club: Titan Mercury WC; Gator WC
- Team: USA
Medal record
Women's freestyle wrestling
Representing the United States
World Championships
| Gold medal – first place | 2012 Strathcona County | 63 kg |
| Silver medal – second place | 2010 Moscow | 63 kg |
| Silver medal – second place | 2014 Tashkent | 63 kg |
| Bronze medal – third place | 2013 Budapest | 63 kg |

Elena Sergey Pirozhkova (born October 13, 1986) is a Russian-born American wrestler who competed for the United States Olympic team in 2012 and 2016. She was the 2012 World Champion, wrestling in the 63 kg weight class. She won the gold medal at the Pan American championships in 2008, 2009, and 2010. She won the silver medal in 2010 and 2014, and won the bronze medal in 2013, at the World Championships. She placed 5th at the 2011 World Championships. She made eight straight U.S. World Teams (2008–15), and won seven straight U.S. Open titles (2009–15).

Pirozhkova was born in Russia but grew up in Greenfield, Massachusetts. She left Russia and moved to the United States of America when she was three years old. She attended Greenfield High School in Massachusetts.

== Personal life ==
Pirozhkova was married to former Cuba-born American Greco-Roman wrestler, Alan Vera, they welcomed their first child in June 2024, just three months before Vera's death.
