= Kaori Icho =

Japanese freestyle wrestler

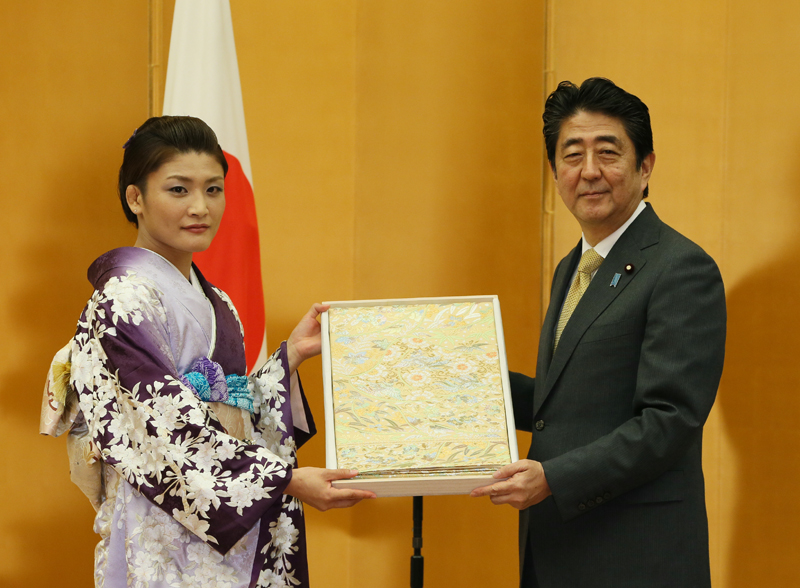
- Kaori Icho received award from Shinzo Abe in 2016

Personal information
- Native name: 伊調馨
- Born: 13 June 1984 (age 42) Hachinohe, Aomori, Japan
- Height: 166 cm (5 ft 5 in) (2016)
- Weight: 61 kg (134 lb) (2016)

Sport
- Country: Japan
- Sport: Wrestling
- Event: Freestyle
- Club: Sogho Security Services
- Coached by: Kazuhito Sakae
Medal record
Women's freestyle wrestling
Representing Japan
Event	1st	2nd	3rd
Olympic Games	4	–	–
World Championships	10	–	–
Asian Games	1	1	–
Golden Grand Prix Ivan Yarygin	–	1	–
Total	15	2	0
Olympic Games
Gold medal – first place	2004 Athens	63 kg
Gold medal – first place	2008 Beijing	63 kg
Gold medal – first place	2012 London	63 kg
Gold medal – first place	2016 Rio de Janeiro	58 kg
World Championships
Gold medal – first place	2002 Chalkida	63 kg
Gold medal – first place	2003 New York	63 kg
Gold medal – first place	2005 Budapest	63 kg
Gold medal – first place	2006 Guangzhou	63 kg
Gold medal – first place	2007 Baku	63 kg
Gold medal – first place	2010 Moscow	63 kg
Gold medal – first place	2011 Istanbul	63 kg
Gold medal – first place	2013 Budapest	63 kg
Gold medal – first place	2014 Tashkent	58 kg
Gold medal – first place	2015 Las Vegas	58 kg
Asian Games
Gold medal – first place	2006 Doha	63 kg
Silver medal – second place	2002 Busan	63 kg
Golden Grand Prix Ivan Yarygin
Silver medal – second place	2016 Krasnoyarsk	58 kg
Asian Championships
Gold medal – first place	2004 Tokyo	63 kg
Gold medal – first place	2005 Wuhan	63 kg
Gold medal – first place	2007 Bishkek	63 kg
Gold medal – first place	2008 Jeju	63 kg
Gold medal – first place	2011 Tashkent	63 kg
Bronze medal – third place	2019 Xi'an	57 kg

Kaori Icho (Japanese: 伊調 馨, Hepburn: Ichō Kaori; born 13 June 1984) is a Japanese freestyle wrestler. She is a ten-time World Champion and four-time Olympic Champion, winning gold in 2004, 2008, 2012 and 2016. After losing to Sara McMann in the 2003 Klippan Open, Icho went undefeated between 2003 and 2016. On 29 January 2016 at the Golden Grand Prix Ivan Yarygin 2016 Icho lost to Pürevdorjiin Orkhon of Mongolia. This was her first loss after a long domination.

She is the first female in any sport to win individual-event gold at four consecutive Olympics. On October 20, 2016, she was awarded the People's Honour Award by Prime Minister Shinzo Abe for her achievements, the second wrestler to receive the highest award, after Saori Yoshida in 2012. She is the younger sister of Chiharu Icho.

== Controversy ==
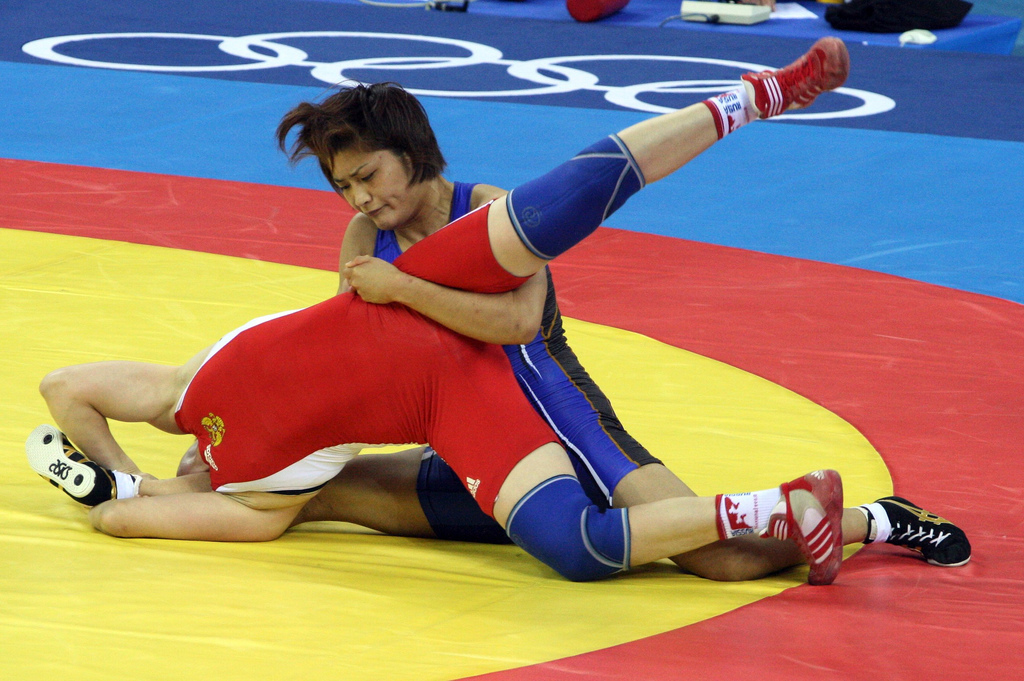
Kaori During match

On January 18, 2018, a formal complaint was filed with the Japanese Cabinet Office, accusing Japan Wrestling Federation development director Kazuhito Sakae (栄和人) of power abuse against Kaori after she left his coaching in 2009 and moved to Tokyo.

Specific alleged acts included ordering Icho’s new coach, Chikara Tanabe (田南部力) to stop coaching her; banning her from the Keishicho (Metropolitan Police) wrestling club where she trained; and prohibiting her from joining men’s training camps. Additionally, Sakae directed others to harass Tanabe when he refused to refused to stop coaching Icho, and excluded Icho from the 2010 Asian Games team despite her qualifications. It was reported that the Shigakkan University clique supported Sakae's ongoing harassment of Icho.

== Championships and accomplishments ==
- Tokyo Sports
  - Wrestling Special Award (2002, 2003, 2004, 2005, 2006, 2011, 2012, 2013, 2014, 2015, 2016)

== See also ==
- List of multiple Olympic gold medalists
- List of multiple Olympic gold medalists in one event
- List of multiple Olympic medalists in one event
