= Yvonne Englich =

German freestyle wrestler (1979–2018)

Yvonne Englich

Yvonne Englich (née Hees; 5 December 1979 – 8 January 2018) was a German freestyle wrestler. She competed since age nine, entering junior local, national, and world competitions. She continued wrestling into adulthood, winning three national championships and a bronze medal in women's freestyle -67kg at the 2011 European Wrestling Championships. She was married to Olympic silver medalist Mirko Englich, and they had two children. In her later years, she coached youth wrestling.

Yvonne Englich died on 8 January 2018 of cancer at age 38.
