= Yekaterina Larionova =

Kazakhstani freestyle wrestler (born 1994)

Personal information
- Nationality: Kazakh
- Born: 23 January 1994 (age 32) Uralsk, Kazakhstan

Sport
- Sport: Sport wrestling
- Event: Freestyle
Medal record
Women's freestyle wrestling
Representing Kazakhstan
Summer Olympics
Bronze medal – third place	2016 Rio de Janeiro	63 kg
FILA Wrestling World Championships
Bronze medal – third place	2013 Budapest	63 kg
World U20 Championships
Bronze medal – third place	2014 Zagreb	63 kg
Bronze medal – third place	2012 Pattaya	63 kg
Golden Grand Prix Ivan Yarygin
Bronze medal – third place	2016 Krasnoyarsk	63 kg

Yekaterina Larionova (born 23 January 1994) is a freestyle wrestler from Kazakhstan. She won the bronze medal in the 63 kg division at the 2013 World Wrestling Championships.
