= Katerina Vidiaux =

Cuban freestyle wrestler

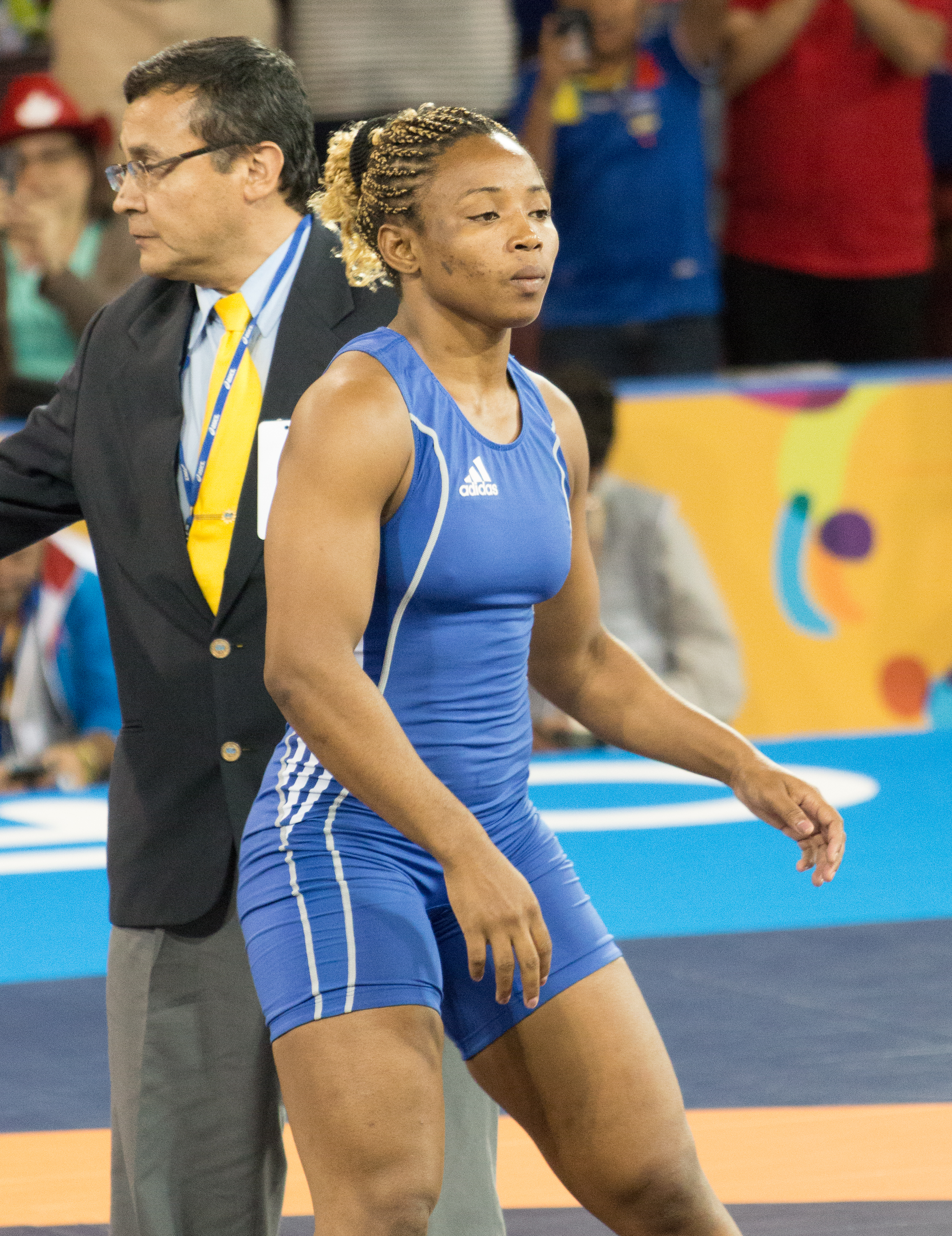
- Vidiaux in 2015

Personal information
- Born: 9 June 1987 (age 39) Holguín, Cuba

Sport
- Sport: Freestyle wrestling
Medal record
Representing Cuba
Pan American Games
| Gold medal – first place | 2011 Guadalajara | 63 kg |
| Silver medal – second place | 2015 Toronto | 63 kg |
Central American and Caribbean Games
| Bronze medal – third place | 2014 Veracruz | 63 kg |

Katerina Vidiaux López (born 9 June 1987) is a Cuban freestyle wrestler. She competed in the freestyle 63 kg event at the 2012 Summer Olympics; after defeating Elif Jale Yeşilırmak in the qualifications, she was eliminated by Lubov Volosova in the 1/8 finals.
