= Maryia Mamashuk =

Belarusian wrestler (born 1992)

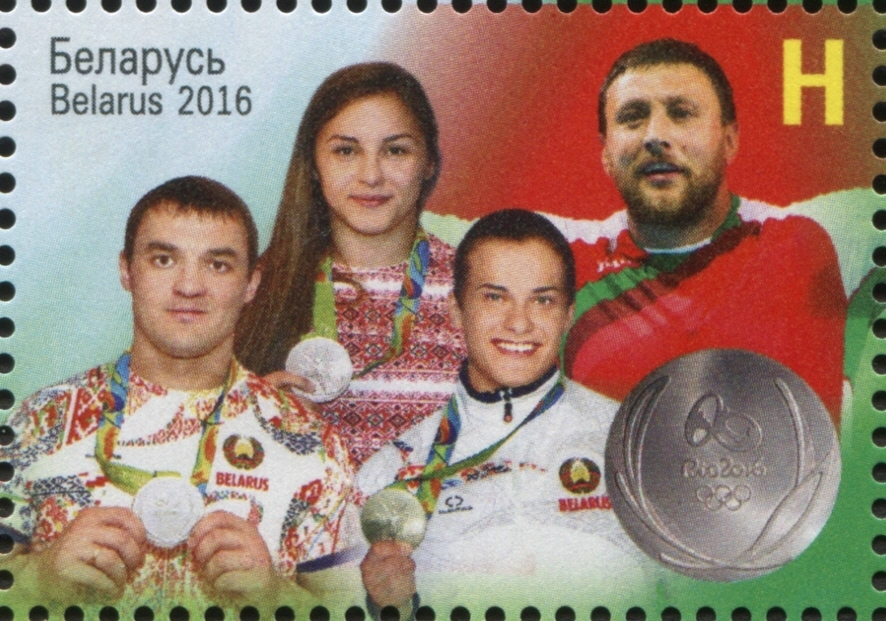
- Mamashuk (top left) on a 2016 stamp of Belarus

Personal information
- Nationality: Belarusian
- Born: 31 August 1992 (age 33) Gomel, Belarus
- Height: 1.63 m (5 ft 4 in)
- Weight: 65 kg (143 lb)

Sport
- Country: Belarus
- Sport: Wrestling
- Coached by: Petr Babei; Sergey Smal (2011-)
Medal record
Representing Belarus
Women's freestyle wrestling
Summer Olympics
Silver medal – second place	2016 Rio de Janeiro	63 kg
European Championships
Gold medal – first place	2016 Riga	69 kg
Silver medal – second place	2014 Vantaa	63 kg

Maryia Mamashuk (Belarusian: Марыя Русланаўна Мамашук; Łacinka: Maryja Rusłanaŭna Mamašuk; born 31 August 1992) is a Belarusian wrestler. Competing in the 63 kg division, she won silver medals at the 2014 European Championships and the 2016 Olympics. In 2016, she also won the European title in the 69 kg category.

In 2021, she lost her bronze medal match in the women's 65 kg event at the World Wrestling Championships held in Oslo, Norway.
