= Monika Michalik =

Polish freestyle wrestler

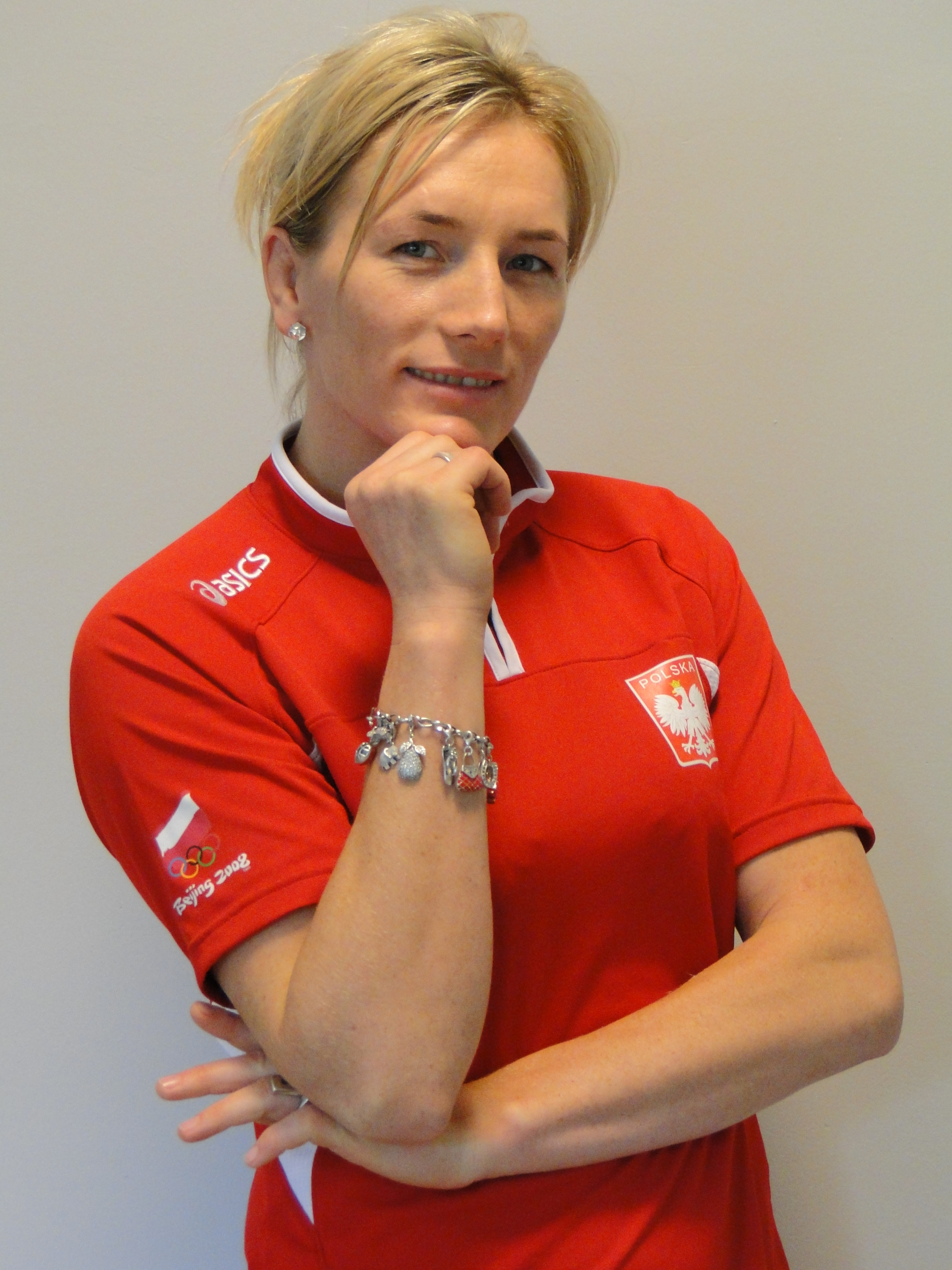

Personal information
- Full name: Monika Ewa Michalik
- Nationality: Polish
- Born: 2 May 1980 (age 46) Międzyrzecz, Poland

Sport
- Country: Poland
- Sport: Freestyle wrestling
Medal record
Women's Freestyle Wrestling
Representing Poland
Event	1st	2nd	3rd
Olympic Games	0	0	1
World Championships	0	0	3
European Championships	3	4	2
Total	3	4	6
Summer Olympics
Bronze medal – third place	2016 Rio de Janeiro	63 kg
World Championships
Bronze medal – third place	2000 Nantes - Junior	63 kg
Bronze medal – third place	2006 Guangzhou	63 kg
Bronze medal – third place	2007 Baku	63 kg
European Championships
Gold medal – first place	2003 Ryga	59 kg
Gold medal – first place	2005 Varna	63 kg
Gold medal – first place	2009 Vilnius	63 kg
Gold medal – first place	2017 Novi Sad	63 kg
Silver medal – second place	2000 Sofia - Junior	55 kg
Silver medal – second place	2002 Seinäjoki	59 kg
Silver medal – second place	2006 Moscow	63 kg
Silver medal – second place	2013 Tbilisi	63 kg
Bronze medal – third place	2007 Sofia	63 kg
Bronze medal – third place	2008 Tampere	63 kg
Golden Grand Prix
Silver medal – second place	2006 Baku	63 kg
Bronze medal – third place	2009 Baku	63 kg
Gold medal – first place	2010 Baku	63 kg
Poland Wrestling Championships
Gold medal – first place	1999 - Junior	56 kg
Gold medal – first place	2000 - Junior	56 kg
Gold medal – first place	2001	55 kg
Gold medal – first place	2002	59 kg
Gold medal – first place	2005 Lodz	63 kg
Gold medal – first place	2006 Zary	63 kg
Gold medal – first place	2007 Zgierz	67 kg
Gold medal – first place	2008 Trzciel	67 kg
Gold medal – first place	2009 Siedlce	72 kg
Gold medal – first place	2010 Trzciel	63 kg

Monika Ewa Michalik (Polish pronunciation: [mɔˈnika ˈɛva miˈxalik]; born 2 May 1980 in Międzyrzecz) is a freestyle wrestler from Poland. She participated in Women's freestyle 63 kg at 2008 Summer Olympics. In the last 16, she beat Volha Khilko from Belarus. In the quarter-finals Michalik lost to the French wrestler Lise Golliot-Legrand.

At the 2012 Summer Olympics, Michalik once again reached the quarter-finals, losing to eventual silver medallist Jing Ruixue of China.

At the 2016 Summer Olympics, she won the bronze medal defeating Inna Trazhukova of Russia.

Her brother Tadeusz is also a wrestler. He won a bronze medal at the 2020 Summer Olympics in Tokyo.
