= 2016 Pan American Wrestling Olympic Qualification Tournament =

The 2016 Olympic Wrestling Pan American Qualification Tournament was the first regional qualifying tournament for the 2016 Olympics.

The top two wrestlers in each weight class earn a qualification spot for their nation.

== Men's freestyle ==
=== 57 kg ===
5 March

Round of 16
Alexis Olivera (MEX)	6
Kevin Bonilla (HON)	14
John Pineda (CAN)	6
Pedro Mejías (VEN)	6

Quarterfinals
Úber Cuero (COL)	0
Yowlys Bonne (CUB)	12
Agustín Destribats (ARG)	8
André Quispe (CHI)	4
Tony Ramos (USA)	2^{F}
Jefferson Mayea (ECU)	0
Kevin Bonilla (HON)	0
Pedro Mejías (VEN)	8

Semifinals
Yowlys Bonne (CUB)	11^{F}
Agustín Destribats (ARG)	1
Tony Ramos (USA)	13
Pedro Mejías (VEN)	2

Final
Yowlys Bonne (CUB)	10
Tony Ramos (USA)	0

Bronze medals
Úber Cuero (COL)	8
Agustín Destribats (ARG)	0
Jefferson Mayea (ECU)	0
Pedro Mejías (VEN)	8

=== 65 kg ===
5 March

Round of 16
Sixto Auccapiña (PER)	6^{F}
Brandon Díaz (MEX)	2
Alejandro Valdés (CUB)	10
Mauricio Sánchez (ECU)	0
Jeffry Avila (DOM)	15
Lincoln Messias (BRA)	10
Luis Barrios (HON)	2
Haislan Garcia (CAN)	9
Anthony Montero (VEN)	11
Marbin Miranda (GUA)	0

Quarterfinals
Brent Metcalf (USA)	7
Franklin Gómez (PUR)	9
Hernán Guzmán (COL)	6
Sixto Auccapiña (PER)	4
Alejandro Valdés (CUB)	10
Jeffry Avila (DOM)	0
Haislan Garcia (CAN)	10
Anthony Montero (VEN)	0

Semifinals
Franklin Gómez (PUR)	8
Hernán Guzmán (COL)	4
Alejandro Valdés (CUB)	6
Haislan Garcia (CAN)	0

Final
Franklin Gómez (PUR)	3
Alejandro Valdés (CUB)	8

Repechage round 1
Mauricio Sánchez (ECU)	9
Jeffry Avila (DOM)	10

Bronze medals
Brent Metcalf (USA)	0
Hernán Guzmán (COL)	0^{R}
Jeffry Avila (DOM)	0
Haislan Garcia (CAN)	10

=== 74 kg ===
5 March

Round of 16
Adonis Arroyo (VEN)	2
Christian Anguiano (MEX)	5
Carlos Izquierdo (COL)	4
Pedro Soto (PUR)	3
Pedro Martínez (GUA)	1
Cleopas Ncube (CAN)	12

Quarterfinals
Pedro Rocha (BRA)	0
Eduardo Gajardo (CHI)	10
Asnage Castelly (HAI)	0
Liván López (CUB)	10
Yoan Blanco (ECU)	4
Christian Anguiano (MEX)	2
Carlos Izquierdo (COL)	0
Cleopas Ncube (CAN)	0^{R}

Semifinals
Eduardo Gajardo (CHI)	0
Liván López (CUB)	2^{F}
Yoan Blanco (ECU)	3
Carlos Izquierdo (COL)	4

Final
Liván López (CUB)	WO
Carlos Izquierdo (COL)

Repechage round 1
Pedro Soto (PUR)	WO
Cleopas Ncube (CAN)

Bronze medals
Asnage Castelly (HAI)	0
Eduardo Gajardo (CHI)	11
Pedro Soto (PUR)	4
Yoan Blanco (ECU)	4

=== 86 kg ===
5 March

Round of 16
Reineris Salas (CUB)	6^{F}
Billy Valdez (DOM)	0
Tamerlan Tagziev (CAN)	10
Adrian Jaoude (BRA)	0

Quarterfinals
Erick Orellana (GUA)	0
Pool Ambrocio (PER)	10
Edixon Paladines (ECU)	3
Jaime Espinal (PUR)	14
Jake Herbert (USA)	9
Pedro Ceballos (VEN)	7
Reineris Salas (CUB)	10
Tamerlan Tagziev (CAN)	4

Semifinals
Pool Ambrocio (PER)	1
Jaime Espinal (PUR)	5
Jake Herbert (USA)	1
Reineris Salas (CUB)	2

Final
Jaime Espinal (PUR)	4
Reineris Salas (CUB)	6

Repechage round 1
Billy Valdez (DOM)	8
Tamerlan Tagziev (CAN)	8^{F}

Bronze medals
Edixon Paladines (ECU)	0
Pool Ambrocio (PER)	4^{F}
Tamerlan Tagziev (CAN)	0
Jake Herbert (USA)	3

=== 97 kg ===
5 March

Quarterfinals		Semifinals		Final
		Paulo Victor Santos (BRA)	0
Javier Cortina (CUB)	10	Javier Cortina (CUB)	11
Jarlis Mosquera (COL)	0			Javier Cortina (CUB)	3
Yuri Maier (ARG)	0			José Daniel Díaz (VEN)	1
Arjun Gill (CAN)	11	Arjun Gill (CAN)	2
José Daniel Díaz (VEN)	7	José Daniel Díaz (VEN)	5
Nathanael Rose (TTO)	0

Bronze medals
Jarlis Mosquera (COL)	10
Paulo Victor Santos (BRA)	0
Nathanael Rose (TTO)	1
Arjun Gill (CAN)	9

=== 125 kg ===
5 March

Quarterfinals
Luis Vivenes (VEN)	4
Yudenny Alpajón (CUB)	4
Edgardo López (PUR)
Tervel Dlagnev (USA)	WO
Antoine Jaoude (BRA)	7
Jesse Ruíz (MEX)	14

Semifinals
Korey Jarvis (CAN)	5^{F}
Luis Vivenes (VEN)	0
Tervel Dlagnev (USA)	WO
Jesse Ruíz (MEX)

Final
Korey Jarvis (CAN)	0
Tervel Dlagnev (USA)	10

Bronze medals
Bye
Luis Vivenes (VEN)
Edgardo López (PUR)
Jesse Ruíz (MEX)	WO

== Men's Greco-Roman ==
=== 59 kg ===
6 March

Round of 16
Raiber Rodríguez (VEN)	4
Jancel Pimentel (DOM)	1
Steven Takahashi (CAN)	12^{F}
Gorge González (HON)	8
Ildar Hafizov (USA)	9
Ali Soto (MEX)	2
Wesley Morales (PUR)	0
Andrés Montaño (ECU)	8
Andrés Taborda (COL)	1
Diego Romanelli (BRA)	2

Quarterfinals
José Luis Magallanes (PER)	3
Cristóbal Torres (CHI)	3
Alex Pineda (PAN)	0
Raiber Rodríguez (VEN)	9
Steven Takahashi (CAN)	15
Ildar Hafizov (USA)	13
Andrés Montaño (ECU)	8
Diego Romanelli (BRA)	0

Semifinals
José Luis Magallanes (PER)	2
Raiber Rodríguez (VEN)	10
Steven Takahashi (CAN)	0
Andrés Montaño (ECU)	8

Final
Raiber Rodríguez (VEN)	0
Andrés Montaño (ECU)	9

Repechage round 1
Jancel Pimentel (DOM)	8
Alex Pineda (PAN)	0
Wesley Morales (PUR)	0
Diego Romanelli (BRA)	9

Bronze medals
Jancel Pimentel (DOM)	5
José Luis Magallanes (PER)	0
Diego Romanelli (BRA)	0
Steven Takahashi (CAN)	8

=== 66 kg ===
6 March

Round of 16
John Yeats (CAN)	13
Joílson Júnior (BRA)	12
Víctor Méndez (MEX)	0
Jefrin Mejía (HON)	9
RaVaughn Perkins (USA)	0
Jair Cuero (COL)	9
Miguel Martínez (CUB)	11
Mario Molina (PER)	0

Quarterfinals
David Choc (GUA)	0
Wuileixis Rivas (VEN)	8
José Sánchez (ECU)	5^{F}
Edward Polanco (DOM)	6
John Yeats (CAN)	0
Jefrin Mejía (HON)	9
Jair Cuero (COL)	1
Miguel Martínez (CUB)	9

Semifinals
Wuileixis Rivas (VEN)	8
José Sánchez (ECU)	0
Jefrin Mejía (HON)	0
Miguel Martínez (CUB)	9

Final
Wuileixis Rivas (VEN)	3
Miguel Martínez (CUB)	2

Repechage round 1
Mario Molina (PER)	0
Jair Cuero (COL)	8

Bronze medals
David Choc (GUA)	0
José Sánchez (ECU)	9
Jair Cuero (COL)	5^{F}
Jefrin Mejía (HON)	0

=== 75 kg ===
6 March

Round of 16
Luis Avendaño (VEN)	2
Juan Ángel Escobar (MEX)	6
Yurisandy Hernández (CUB)	8
Alvis Almendra (PAN)	0
Luis Centeno (PUR)	2
Shawn Daye-Finley (CAN)	6
Ângelo Moreira (BRA)	12
Enrique Cuero (ECU)	8

Quarterfinals
Claudio Gamboa (CHI)	0
Maximiliano Prudenzano (ARG)	8
Carlos Muñoz (COL)	8
Renzo García (PER)	0
Juan Ángel Escobar (MEX)	0
Yurisandy Hernández (CUB)	2^{F}
Shawn Daye-Finley (CAN)	4
Ângelo Moreira (BRA)	10

Semifinals
Maximiliano Prudenzano (ARG)	0
Carlos Muñoz (COL)	5
Yurisandy Hernández (CUB)	7
Ângelo Moreira (BRA)	0

Final
Carlos Muñoz (COL)	0
Yurisandy Hernández (CUB)	6

Repechage round 1
Alvis Almendra (PAN)	0
Juan Ángel Escobar (MEX)	11

Bronze medals
Renzo García (PER)	4
Maximiliano Prudenzano (ARG)	6
Juan Ángel Escobar (MEX)	9
Ângelo Moreira (BRA)	0

=== 85 kg ===
6 March

Quarterfinals		Semifinals		Final
Luis De Gracia (PAN)	0
Yorgen Cova (VEN)	10	Yorgen Cova (VEN)	0
Alex Brown-Theriault (CAN)	0	Jordan Holm (USA)	3
Jordan Holm (USA)	8			Jordan Holm (USA)	9
Cristian Mosquera (COL)	3			Alfonso Leyva (MEX)	0
Alfonso Leyva (MEX)	4	Alfonso Leyva (MEX)	5
Ronisson Brandão (BRA)	WO	Ronisson Brandão (BRA)	0
Alan Vera (CUB)

Bronze medals
Alex Brown-Theriault (CAN)	0
Yorgen Cova (VEN)	8
Cristian Mosquera (COL)	5
Ronisson Brandão (BRA)	0

=== 98 kg ===
6 March

Round of 16
Luillys Pérez (VEN)	9
Iván Burtovoy (ARG)	0

Quarterfinals
Yasmany Lugo (CUB)	9
Davi Albino (BRA)	0
Joe Rau (USA)	6
Kevin Mejía (HON)	0
Alex Thoms (CAN)	0
Óscar Loango (COL)	10
Carlos García (CHI)	0^{R}
Luillys Pérez (VEN)	2

Semifinals
Yasmany Lugo (CUB)	5^{F}
Joe Rau (USA)	0
Óscar Loango (COL)	2
Luillys Pérez (VEN)	7

Final
Yasmany Lugo (CUB)	WO
Luillys Pérez (VEN)

Repechage round 1
Iván Burtovoy (ARG)	WO
Carlos García (CHI)

Bronze medals
Davi Albino (BRA)	3
Joe Rau (USA)	11
Iván Burtovoy (ARG)	0
Óscar Loango (COL)	9

=== 130 kg ===
6 March

Round of 16
Erwin Caraballo (VEN)	1
Josué Encarnación (DOM)	0
Luis Alberto Román (MEX)	11
Charles Thoms (CAN)	14

Quarterfinals
Randy Lambert (HON)	0
Antoine Jaoude (BRA)	4^{F}
Luciano del Río (ARG)	0
Andrés Ayub (CHI)	8
Edgardo López (PUR)	4
Rodolfo Waithe (PAN)	1
Erwin Caraballo (VEN)	8
Charles Thoms (CAN)	0

Semifinals
Antoine Jaoude (BRA)	7
Andrés Ayub (CHI)	1
Edgardo López (PUR)	0
Erwin Caraballo (VEN)	9

Final
Antoine Jaoude (BRA)	0
Erwin Caraballo (VEN)	8

Repechage round 1
Josué Encarnación (DOM)	8
Charles Thoms (CAN)	0

Bronze medals
Randy Lambert (HON)	0
Andrés Ayub (CHI)	4^{F}
Josué Encarnación (DOM)	3
Edgardo López (PUR)	0

== Women's freestyle ==
=== 48 kg ===
4 March

Round of 16
Alyssa Lampe (USA)	10^{F}
Brenda Bailey (HON)	0
Carolina Castillo (COL)	7
Katiuska Toaza (ECU)	2

Quarterfinals
Sheykaliz Cintron (PUR)	0
Susana Almeida (BRA)	2
Patricia Bermúdez (ARG)	8
Laura Peredo (MEX)	2
Thalía Mallqui (PER)	5
Yusneylys Guzmán (CUB)	4^{F}
Alyssa Lampe (USA)	1
Carolina Castillo (COL)	4

Semifinals
Susana Almeida (BRA)	0
Patricia Bermúdez (ARG)	3
Yusneylys Guzmán (CUB)	1
Carolina Castillo (COL)	11

Final
Patricia Bermúdez (ARG)
Carolina Castillo (COL)	WO

Repechage round 1
Katiuska Toaza (ECU)	4
Alyssa Lampe (USA)	4^{F}

Bronze medals
Laura Peredo (MEX)	3
Susana Almeida (BRA)	0
Alyssa Lampe (USA)	10
Yusneylys Guzmán (CUB)	0

=== 53 kg ===
4 March

Round of 16
Betzabeth Argüello (VEN)	2
Jenny Mallqui (PER)	1
Giullia Penalber (BRA)	2
Lianna Montero (CUB)	7

Quarterfinals
Luisa Valverde (ECU)	7
Alma Valencia (MEX)	5
Jillian Gallays (CAN)	12
Whitney Conder (USA)	0
Nes Marie Rodríguez (PUR)	2
Leidy Cifuentes (COL)	6
Betzabeth Argüello (VEN)	4
Lianna Montero (CUB)	0

Semifinals
Luisa Valverde (ECU)	0
Jillian Gallays (CAN)	10
Leidy Cifuentes (COL)	0
Betzabeth Argüello (VEN)	11

Final
Jillian Gallays (CAN)	WO
Betzabeth Argüello (VEN)

Repechage round 1
Jenny Mallqui (PER)	0
Lianna Montero (CUB)	10

Bronze medals
Whitney Conder (USA)	12
Luisa Valverde (ECU)	2
Lianna Montero (CUB)	11
Leidy Cifuentes (COL)	0

=== 58 kg ===
4 March

Round of 16
Alli Ragan (USA)	10
Emily Sánchez (PAN)	0

Quarterfinals
Lissette Antes (ECU)	10^{F}
Yaquelin Estornell (CUB)	2
Joice Silva (BRA)	8
Yanet Sovero (PER)	6
Virginia Jiménez (VEN)	6
Alejandra Romero (MEX)	2
Michelle Fazzari (CAN)	5
Alli Ragan (USA)	4

Semifinals
Lissette Antes (ECU)	3
Joice Silva (BRA)	2^{F}
Virginia Jiménez (VEN)	0
Michelle Fazzari (CAN)	9

Final
Joice Silva (BRA)	3
Michelle Fazzari (CAN)	10^{F}

Bronze medals
Yanet Sovero (PER)	1
Lissette Antes (ECU)	7
Alli Ragan (USA)	5
Virginia Jiménez (VEN)	8

=== 63 kg ===
4 March

Quarterfinals
Saidy Chávez (HON)	0
Nathaly Grimán (VEN)	10
Leidy Izquierdo (COL)	3
Laís Nunes (BRA)	7

Semifinals
Katerina Vidiaux (CUB)	0
Erin Clodgo (USA)	8
Nathaly Grimán (VEN)	2
Laís Nunes (BRA)	10

Final
Erin Clodgo (USA)	WO
Laís Nunes (BRA)

Bronze medals
Bye
Katerina Vidiaux (CUB)
Leidy Izquierdo (COL)	0
Nathaly Grimán (VEN)	4^{C}

=== 69 kg ===
4 March

Quarterfinals
Yudaris Sánchez (CUB)	2
Dorothy Yeats (CAN)	12
Tamyra Mensah (USA)	5
María Acosta (VEN)	0

Semifinals
Diana Miranda (MEX)	2
Gilda Oliveira (BRA)	2
Dorothy Yeats (CAN)	5
Tamyra Mensah (USA)	0

Final
Gilda Oliveira (BRA)	0
Dorothy Yeats (CAN)	10

Bronze medals
Bye
Diana Miranda (MEX)
Yudaris Sánchez (CUB)	8^{F}
Tamyra Mensah (USA)	5

=== 75 kg ===
4 March

Pos	Athlete	Pld	W	L	CP	TP	CAN	VEN	CUB	PUR	MEX
1	Erica Wiebe (CAN)	4	4	0	15	27	—	10–0	2–0	6–2 Fall	9–0 Fall
2	Jaramit Weffer (VEN)	4	2	2	9	20	0–4 ST	—	2–3	12–7 Fall	6–0 Fall
3	Lisset Hechevarría (CUB)	4	2	2	8	11	0–3 PO	3–1 PP	—	2–9	6–0 Fall
4	Dayanara Rivera (PUR)	4	2	2	6	29	0–4 VT	0–4 VT	3–1 PP	—	11–2
5	Cinthia Morales (MEX)	4	0	4	1	2	0–4 VT	0–4 VT	0–4 VT	1–3 PP	—

Source: UWW
