= Cuba at the 2016 Summer Olympics =

- IOC code: CUB
- NOC: Cuban Olympic Committee

in Rio de Janeiro
- Competitors: 124 in 18 sports
- Flag bearer: Mijaín López
- Medals Ranked 18th: Gold 5 Silver 2 Bronze 4 Total 11

Summer Olympics appearances (overview)
- 1900; 1904; 1908–1920; 1924; 1928; 1932–1936; 1948; 1952; 1956; 1960; 1964; 1968; 1972; 1976; 1980; 1984–1988; 1992; 1996; 2000; 2004; 2008; 2012; 2016; 2020; 2024

Cuba competed at the 2016 Summer Olympics in Rio de Janeiro, Brazil, from 5 to 21 August 2016. This was the nation's twentieth appearance at the Summer Olympics. The Cuban team consisted of 124 athletes, 89 men and 35 women, across eighteen sports.

Cuba returned home from Rio de Janeiro with a total of 11 medals (5 gold, 2 silver, and 4 bronze), its lowest haul in Summer Olympic history since 1976 based on the overall tally. Six of these medals were awarded to the Cuban team in boxing, three in wrestling, and one each in athletics and judo (both of which were won by women).

The most significant Cuban highlight of the Games came from Mijaín López, who successfully defended his super heavyweight title in Greco-Roman wrestling, matching a historic "three-peat" effort with Russian legend Alexander Karelin in the same sport category. Moreover, Lopez joined heavyweight boxers Teófilo Stevenson (1972–1980) and Félix Savón (1992–2000) as the only Cubans to ever achieve three successive Olympic titles.

Boxers Robeisy Ramírez (bantamweight), Arlen López (middleweight), and Julio César La Cruz (light heavyweight) contributed three of the country's gold medals through their respective weight categories, while reigning world lightweight champion Ismael Borrero added the Olympic title to his career treasury in Greco-Roman wrestling. On the women's side, judoka Idalys Ortiz completed a full set of medals at her third Olympics with a silver in the heavyweight class (+78 kg), bowing out her title defense to France's Émilie Andéol. Meanwhile, world champion Denia Caballero collected the country's only track and field medal with a bronze in the discus throw.

== Medalists ==
Medal	Name	Sport	Event	Date
Gold	Ismael Borrero	Wrestling	Men's Greco-Roman 59 kg	14 August
Gold	Mijaín López	Wrestling	Men's Greco-Roman 130 kg	15 August
Gold	Julio César La Cruz	Boxing	Men's light heavyweight	18 August
Gold	Robeisy Ramírez	Boxing	Men's bantamweight	20 August
Gold	Arlen López	Boxing	Men's middleweight	20 August
Silver	Idalys Ortiz	Judo	Women's +78 kg	12 August
Silver	Yasmany Lugo	Wrestling	Men's Greco-Roman 98 kg	16 August
Bronze	Joahnys Argilagos	Boxing	Men's light flyweight	12 August
Bronze	Erislandy Savón	Boxing	Men's heavyweight	13 August
Bronze	Lázaro Álvarez	Boxing	Men's lightweight	14 August
Bronze	Denia Caballero	Athletics	Women's discus throw	16 August

Medals by sport
Sport	1st place, gold medalist(s)	2nd place, silver medalist(s)	3rd place, bronze medalist(s)	Total
Boxing	3	0	3	6
Wrestling	2	1	0	3
Judo	0	1	0	1
Athletics	0	0	1	1
Total	5	2	4	11

== Competitors ==
The Cuban Olympic Committee fielded a team of 124 athletes, 89 men and 35 women, across 18 sports at the Games. Although its full roster was roughly larger by 13 athletes than in London four years earlier, it was still one of Cuba's smallest delegations sent to the Olympics since 1964.

Men's volleyball was the only collective sport in which Cuba qualified for the Games, having returned to the Olympic scene after a sixteen-year absence. For individual-based sports, Cuba made its Olympic debut in badminton, as well as its return to fencing, modern pentathlon, and beach volleyball after being absent from London 2012, and artistic gymnastics after 12 years. Track and field accounted for the largest number of athletes on the Cuban team, with 43 entries. There was a single competitor each in archery, badminton, fencing, and taekwondo.

Fifteen of Cuba's past Olympic medalists returned, including defending champions Idalys Ortiz (judo, women's +78 kg), boxers Robeisy Ramírez (bantamweight) and Roniel Iglesias (welterweight), and rapid fire pistol shooter Leuris Pupo, who headed the roster as the most experienced competitor going to his fifth straight Games. Aiming for a historic golden three-peat in the super heavyweight category, Greco-Roman wrestler Mijaín López was selected to lead the Cuban delegation for the third consecutive time as the flag bearer in the opening ceremony. Moreover, he matched the record of boxing legend Teófilo Stevenson, who carried the Cuban flag at Munich 1972, Montreal 1976, and Moscow 1980.

Seventeen-year-old artistic gymnast Marcia Vidiaux was Cuba's youngest competitor, with skeet shooter and Athens 2004 bronze medalist Juan Miguel Rodríguez rounding out the field as the oldest competitor (aged 49).

Other notable athletes on the Cuban roster included 2015 world silver medalist Manrique Larduet in men's artistic gymnastics, pole vaulter Yarisley Silva, world boxing champions Joahnys Argilagos (light flyweight), Yosvany Veitía (flyweight), Lázaro Álvarez (lightweight), Arlen López (middleweight), and Julio César La Cruz (light heavyweight), world-ranked rower Ángel Fournier in the men's single sculls, and Greco-Roman wrestler Ismael Borrero (men's 59 kg).

The following is the list of number of competitors participating in the Games. Note that reserves in fencing are not counted as athletes:

Sport	Men	Women	Total
Archery	1	0	1
Athletics	24	19	43
Badminton	1	0	1
Boxing	10	0	10
Canoeing	5	1	6
Cycling	0	3	3
Fencing	1	0	1
Gymnastics	2	1	3
Judo	5	4	9
Modern pentathlon	1	1	2
Rowing	5	2	7
Shooting	5	2	7
Swimming	1	1	2
Table tennis	2	0	2
Taekwondo	1	0	1
Volleyball	14	0	14
Weightlifting	1	1	2
Wrestling	10	0	10
Total	89	35	124

== Archery ==
One Cuban archer has qualified for the men's individual recurve at the Olympics by receiving a spare berth freed up by El Salvador as the next highest-ranked eligible athlete, not yet qualified, at the Pan American Qualification Tournament in Medellín, Colombia.

Athlete	Event	Ranking round		Round of 64	Round of 32	Round of 16	Quarterfinals	Semifinals	Final / BM	
Athlete	Event	Score	Seed	Opposition Score	Opposition Score	Opposition Score	Opposition Score	Opposition Score	Opposition Score	Rank
Adrián Puentes	Men's individual	656	37	Boardman (MEX); W 6–4	Das (IND); L 4–6	Did not advance				

== Athletics (track and field) ==
Cuban athletes have so far achieved qualifying standards in the following athletics events (up to a maximum of 3 athletes in each event):

Following the end of the qualifying period on July 11, 2016, a total of 43 athletes (24 men and 19 women) were named to the Cuban track and field roster, as part of the nation's official team announcement nine days later. Among them featured hurdler and Beijing 2008 champion Dayron Robles, London 2012 medalists Yarisley Silva (pole vault) and Leonel Suárez (decathlon), 2015 world champion Denia Caballero, and triple jumper and world leader Pedro Pablo Pichardo.

Key

- Note–Ranks given for track events are within the athlete's heat only
- Q = Qualified for the next round
- q = Qualified for the next round as a fastest loser or, in field events, by position without achieving the qualifying target
- NR = National record
- N/A = Round not applicable for the event
- Bye = Athlete not required to compete in round

Track & road events
Men

Athlete	Event	Heat		Semifinal		Final	
Athlete	Event	Result	Rank	Result	Rank	Result	Rank
José Luis Gaspar	400 m hurdles	50.58	7	Did not advance			
Yoandys Lescay	400 m	45.36	3 Q	45.00	6	Did not advance	
Reynier Mena	200 m	20.42	4	Did not advance			
Yordan O'Farrill	110 m hurdles	13.56	4 Q	13.70	7	Did not advance	
Richer Pérez	Marathon	—N/a				2:18:05	46
Jhoanis Portilla	110 m hurdles	DSQ		Did not advance			
Dayron Robles	110 m hurdles	DNS		Did not advance			
Roberto Skyers	200 m	20.44	2 Q	20.60	8	Did not advance	
Edel Amores; Yaniel Carrero; Reynier Mena; Reidis Ramos; César Yuniel Ruiz; Roberto Skyers	4 × 100 m relay	38.47	7	—N/a		Did not advance	
Adrián Chacón; William Collazo; José Luis Gaspar; Yoandys Lescay; Osmaidel Pellicier; Leandro Zamora	4 × 400 m relay	3:00.16	3 Q	—N/a		2:59.53	6

Women

Athlete	Event	Heat		Semifinal		Final	
Athlete	Event	Result	Rank	Result	Rank	Result	Rank
Rose Mary Almanza	800 m	2:00.50	3	Did not advance			
Dailín Belmonte	Marathon	—N/a				2:48:58	102
Sahily Diago	800 m	2:01.38	3	Did not advance			
Arialis Gandulla	200 m	23.41	6	Did not advance			
Zurian Hechavarría	400 m hurdles	57.28	7	Did not advance			
Lisneidy Veitia	800 m	2:02.10	4	Did not advance			
Daisurami Bonne; Gilda Casanova; Evelyn Cipriano; Sahily Diago; Roxana Gomez; Lisneidy Veitia	4 × 400 m relay	3:30.11	8	—N/a		Did not advance	

Field events
Men

Athlete	Event	Qualification		Final	
Athlete	Event	Distance	Position	Distance	Position
Jorge Fernández	Discus throw	60.43	22	Did not advance	
Roberto Janet	Hammer throw	73.23	14	Did not advance	
Lázaro Martínez	Triple jump	16.61	12 q	16.68	8
Maykel Massó	Long jump	7.81	15	Did not advance	
Pedro Pablo Pichardo	Triple jump	DNS		Did not advance	
Ernesto Revé	Triple jump	16.58	14	Did not advance	

Women

Athlete	Event	Qualification		Final	
Athlete	Event	Distance	Position	Distance	Position
Yulenmis Aguilar	Javelin throw	54.94	29	Did not advance	
Denia Caballero	Discus throw	62.94	6 Q	65.34	3rd place, bronze medalist(s)
Yirisleydi Ford	Hammer throw	10.91	32	Did not advance	
Yaniuvis López	Shot put	17.15	22	Did not advance	
Yaime Pérez	Discus throw	65.38	1 Q	NM	—
Liadagmis Povea	Triple jump	13.78	25	Did not advance	
Yarisley Silva	Pole vault	4.60	5 q	4.60	=7
Saily Viart	Shot put	16.99	26	Did not advance	

Combined events – Men's decathlon

Athlete	Event	100 m	LJ	SP	HJ	400 m	110H	DT	PV	JT	1500 m	Final	Rank
Yordanis García	Result	10.81	6.83	14.58	2.01	48.69	14.25	40.34	4.50	64.70	4:44.99	7961	18
Yordanis García	Points	903	774	764	813	876	942	671	760	809	649	7961	18
Leonel Suárez	Result	11.21	7.14	14.27	2.07	48.15	14.48	47.07	4.90	72.32	4:28.32	8460	6
Leonel Suárez	Points	814	847	745	868	902	913	810	880	925	756	8460	6

Combined events – Women's heptathlon

Athlete	Event	100H	HJ	SP	200 m	LJ	JT	800 m	Final	Rank
Yorgelis Rodríguez	Result	13.61	1.86	13.69	24.26	6.25	48.89	2:14.65	6481	9
Yorgelis Rodríguez	Points	1034	1054	773	956	927	835	898	6481	9

== Badminton ==
Cuba has qualified one badminton player for the men's singles into the Olympic tournament. Osleni Guerrero had claimed his Olympic spot as one of top 34 individual shuttlers in the BWF World Rankings as of 5 May 2016.

Athlete	Event	Group Stage			Elimination	Quarterfinal	Semifinal	Final / BM	
Athlete	Event	Opposition Score	Opposition Score	Rank	Opposition Score	Opposition Score	Opposition Score	Opposition Score	Rank
Osleni Guerrero	Men's singles	Sugiarto (INA); L (12–21, 14–21)	Shu (USA); W (21–16, 21–15)	2	Did not advance				

== Boxing ==
Cuba has entered ten male boxers to compete in each of the following weight classes into the Olympic boxing tournament. Olympic bronze medalist Yasniel Toledo was the only Cuban finishing among the top two of their respective weight division in the World Series of Boxing.

Five boxers (Argilagos, Veitía, Alvarez, López, and La Cruz) qualified through the 2015 World Championships, while Roniel Iglesias, Erislandy Savón and Lenier Pero had claimed their Olympic spots at the 2016 American Qualification Tournament in Buenos Aires, Argentina. London 2012 champion Robeisy Ramírez was the last Cuban boxer to upgrade an Olympic spot in the men's bantamweight division with a quarterfinal triumph at the 2016 AIBA World Qualifying Tournament in Baku, Azerbaijan.

Athlete	Event	Round of 32	Round of 16	Quarterfinals	Semifinals	Final	
Athlete	Event	Opposition Result	Opposition Result	Opposition Result	Opposition Result	Opposition Result	Rank
Joahnys Argilagos	Men's light flyweight	Bye	Yafai (GBR); W 2–1	Warui (KEN); W 3–0	Martinez (COL); L 1–2	Did not advance	3rd place, bronze medalist(s)
Yosvany Veitía	Men's flyweight	Bye	Kharroubi (MAR); W 3–0	Hu Jg (CHN); L 1–2	Did not advance		
Robeisy Ramírez	Men's bantamweight	Thapa (IND); W 3–0	Hamout (MAR); W 2–1	Zhang Jw (CHN); W 3–0	Akhmadaliev (UZB); W 3–0	Stevenson (USA); W 2–1	1st place, gold medalist(s)
Lázaro Álvarez	Men's lightweight	Bye	Tommasone (ITA); W 3–0	Balderas (USA); W 3–0	Conceição (BRA); L 0–3	Did not advance	3rd place, bronze medalist(s)
Yasniel Toledo	Men's light welterweight	Bye	McCormack (GBR); W 2–1	Sotomayor (AZE); L 0–3	Did not advance		
Roniel Iglesias	Men's welterweight	Bye	Margaryan (ARM); W TKO	Giyasov (UZB); L 0–3	Did not advance		
Arlen López	Men's middleweight	Bye	Harcsa (HUN); W TKO	Assomo (FRA); W 3–0	Shakhsuvarly (AZE); W 3–0	Melikuziev (UZB); W 3–0	1st place, gold medalist(s)
Julio César La Cruz	Men's light heavyweight	Bye	Ünal (TUR); W 3–0	Borges (BRA); W 3–0	Bauderlique (FRA); W 3–0	Niyazymbetov (KAZ); W 3–0	1st place, gold medalist(s)
Erislandy Savón	Men's heavyweight	Bye	Okolie (GBR); W 3–0	Peralta (ARG); W 3–0	Levit (KAZ); L 0–3	Did not advance	3rd place, bronze medalist(s)
Lenier Pero	Men's super heavyweight	Bye	Vianello (ITA); W 3–0	Hrgović (CRO); L TKO	Did not advance		

== Canoeing ==
=== Sprint ===
Cuban canoeists have qualified a single boat in the women's K-1 200 m for the Games through the 2015 ICF Canoe Sprint World Championships. Meanwhile, four additional boats were awarded to the Cuban squad at the 2016 Pan American Sprint Qualifier in Gainesville, Georgia, United States, either by winning their event or when the quota place for their event passed to the highest finisher not qualified.

Athlete	Event	Heats		Semifinals		Final	
Athlete	Event	Time	Rank	Time	Rank	Time	Rank
Fidel Antonio Vargas	Men's K-1 200 m	35.561	6	Did not advance			
Jorge Dayán; Serguey Torres	Men's C-2 1000 m	3:34.939	2 Q	3:40.192	1 FA	3:48.133	6
Jorge García; Reinier Torres	Men's K-2 1000 m	3:25.711	5 Q	3:23.466	5 FB	3:18.768	9
Yusmari Mengana	Women's K-1 200 m	41.701	1 Q	41.688	6 FB	42.036	12
Yusmari Mengana	Women's K-1 500 m	2:02.162	6	Did not advance			

Qualification Legend: FA = Qualify to final (medal); FB = Qualify to final B (non-medal)

== Cycling ==
=== Road ===
Cuba has qualified one rider in the women's Olympic road race by virtue of a top 22 national finish in the 2016 UCI World Rankings.

Athlete	Event	Time	Rank
Arlenis Sierra	Women's road race	3:58:03	28

=== Track ===
Following the completion of the 2016 UCI Track Cycling World Championships, Cuban riders have accumulated spots in the women's sprint, women's keirin, and women's omnium, by virtue of their final individual Olympic rankings in those events.

Sprint

Athlete	Event	Qualification		Round 1	Repechage 1	Round 2	Repechage 2	Quarterfinals	Semifinals	Final	
Athlete	Event	Time Speed (km/h)	Rank	Opposition Time Speed (km/h)	Opposition Time Speed (km/h)	Opposition Time Speed (km/h)	Opposition Time Speed (km/h)	Opposition Time Speed (km/h)	Opposition Time Speed (km/h)	Opposition Time Speed (km/h)	Rank
Lisandra Guerra	Women's sprint	11.171; 64.452	20	Did not advance							

Keirin

Athlete	Event	1st round	Repechage	2nd round	Final
Athlete	Event	Rank	Rank	Rank	Rank
Lisandra Guerra	Women's keirin	3 R	3	Did not advance	

Omnium

Athlete	Event	Scratch race		Individual pursuit			Elimination race		Time trial			Flying lap			Points race		Total points	Rank
Athlete	Event	Rank	Points	Time	Rank	Points	Rank	Points	Time	Rank	Points	Time	Rank	Points	Points	Rank	Total points	Rank
Marlies Mejías	Women's omnium	12	18	3:34.034	8	26	18	6	35.655	8	26	14.441	9	24	73	3	173	7

== Fencing ==
Cuba has entered one fencer into the Olympic competition, signifying the nation's sporting comeback after an eight-year hiatus. Yoendry Iriarte had claimed his Olympic spot in the men's sabre by virtue of a top two finish at the Pan American Zonal Qualifier in San José, Costa Rica.

Athlete	Event	Round of 32	Round of 16	Quarterfinal	Semifinal	Final / BM	
Athlete	Event	Opposition Score	Opposition Score	Opposition Score	Opposition Score	Opposition Score	Rank
Yoendry Iriarte	Men's sabre	Kim J-h (KOR); L 7–15	Did not advance				

== Gymnastics ==
=== Artistic ===
Cuba has entered three artistic gymnasts into the Olympic competition. 2015 Pan American Games runner-up Manrique Larduet had claimed his Olympic spot in the men's apparatus and all-around events through the 2015 World Championships, while his teammate Randy Lerú performed the same feat, as well as Marcia Videaux in the women's at the Olympic Test Event in Rio de Janeiro.

Men

Athlete	Event	Qualification								Final							
Athlete	Event	Apparatus						Total	Rank	Apparatus						Total	Rank
Athlete	Event	F	PH	R	V	PB	HB	Total	Rank	F	PH	R	V	PB	HB	Total	Rank
Manrique Larduet	All-around	15.200	13.866	15.100	11.766	15.766	15.116	86.814	15 Q	0.000	0.000	15.133	14.000	0.000	0.000	29.133	24
Manrique Larduet	Parallel bars	—N/a				15.766	—N/a	15.766	4 Q	—N/a				15.625	—N/a	15.625	5
Manrique Larduet	Horizontal bar	—N/a					15.116	15.116	8 Q	—N/a					15.033	15.033	6
Randy Lerú	All-around	13.000	11.966	13.400	14.166	15.000	14.866	82.398	43	Did not advance							

Women

Athlete	Event	Qualification						Final					
Athlete	Event	Apparatus				Total	Rank	Apparatus				Total	Rank
Athlete	Event	V	UB	BB	F	Total	Rank	V	UB	BB	F	Total	Rank
Marcia Videaux	Floor	—N/a			13.066	13.066	58	Did not advance					

== Judo ==
Cuba has qualified a total of nine judokas for each of the following weight classes at the Games. Eight of them (five men and three women), including London 2012 champion Idalys Ortíz and silver medalist Asley González, were ranked among the top 22 eligible judokas for men and top 14 for women in the IJF World Ranking List of May 30, 2016, while Beijing 2008 runner-up Yalennis Castillo at women's half-heavyweight (78 kg) earned a continental quota spot from the Pan American region as the highest-ranked Cuban judoka outside of direct qualifying position.

Men

Athlete	Event	Round of 64	Round of 32	Round of 16	Quarterfinals	Semifinals	Repechage	Final / BM	
Athlete	Event	Opposition Result	Opposition Result	Opposition Result	Opposition Result	Opposition Result	Opposition Result	Opposition Result	Rank
Magdiel Estrada	−73 kg	Ježek (CZE); W 010–002	Shavdatuashvili (GEO); L 000–100	Did not advance					
Iván Felipe Silva	−81 kg	Bye	Tchrikishvili (GEO); L 000–001	Did not advance					
Asley González	−90 kg	Michel (BOL); W 110–000	Nhabali (UKR); W 101–000	Lkhagvasüren (MGL); L 000–100	Did not advance				
José Armenteros	−100 kg	Bye	Naidangiin (MGL); W 001–000	Darwish (EGY); L 000–001	Did not advance				
Alex García Mendoza	+100 kg	—N/a	Abdurakhmonov (TJK); W 100–000	Bor (HUN); W 000–000 S	Harasawa (JPN); L 000–100	Did not advance	Krakovetskii (KGZ); W 100–000	Sasson (ISR); L 000–000 S	5

Women

Athlete	Event	Round of 32	Round of 16	Quarterfinals	Semifinals	Repechage	Final / BM	
Athlete	Event	Opposition Result	Opposition Result	Opposition Result	Opposition Result	Opposition Result	Opposition Result	Rank
Dayaris Mestre	−48 kg	Ratiarison (MAD); W 000–000 S	Figueroa (ESP); W 001–000	Menezes (BRA); W 000–000 S	Jeong B-k (KOR); L 000–100	Bye	Galbadrakh (KAZ); L 000–100	5
Maricet Espinosa	−63 kg	Khatri (NEP); W 011–000	Gerbi (ISR); L 001–100	Did not advance				
Yalennis Castillo	−78 kg	Bye	Verkerk (NED); W 000–000 S	Velenšek (SLO); L 000–100	Bye	Joó (HUN); W 001–000	Aguiar (BRA); L 000–001	5
Idalys Ortiz	+78 kg	Bye	Chibisova (RUS); W 100–000	Kim M-j (KOR); W 101–000	Yamabe (JPN); W 001–000	Bye	Andéol (FRA); L 000–100	2nd place, silver medalist(s)

== Modern pentathlon ==
Cuban athletes have qualified for the following places to compete in modern pentathlon. José Figueroa and Leydi Moya secured a selection each in the men's and women's event respectively after obtaining one of the five Olympic slots from the Pan American Games.

Athlete	Event	Fencing (épée one touch)				Swimming (200 m freestyle)			Riding (show jumping)			Combined: shooting/running (10 m air pistol)/(3200 m)			Total points	Final rank
Athlete	Event	RR	BR	Rank	MP points	Time	Rank	MP points	Penalties	Rank	MP points	Time	Rank	MP Points	Total points	Final rank
José Figueroa	Men's	9–26	2	34	156	2:15.39	36	294	67	32	233	12:49.13	36	531	1214	32
Leydi Moya	Women's	14–21	0	29	184	2:15.75	13	293	EL	=31	0	13:11.07	27	509	986	34

== Rowing ==
Cuba has qualified four boats for each of the following rowing classes into the Olympic regatta. Two of these crews had confirmed Olympic spots each in the men's single and double sculls at the 2015 FISA World Championships in Lac d'Aiguebelette, France, while the lightweight double sculls rowers had added one boat per gender to the Cuban roster with a top six finish at the 2016 Latin American Continental Qualification Regatta in Valparaíso, Chile.

Men

Athlete	Event	Heats		Repechage		Quarterfinals		Semifinals		Final	
Athlete	Event	Time	Rank	Time	Rank	Time	Rank	Time	Rank	Time	Rank
Ángel Fournier	Single sculls	7:06.89	1 QF	Bye		6:51.89	1 SA/B	7:02.65	3 FA	6:55.90	6
Adrián Oquendo; Eduardo Rubio	Double sculls	6:52.20	5 R	6:21.52	4	—N/a		Did not advance			
Liosbel Hernández; Raúl Hernández	Lightweight double sculls	6:39.79	4 R	7:07.17	3 SC/D	—N/a		7:30.13	2 FC	6:47.80	18

Women

Athlete	Event	Heats		Repechage		Semifinals		Final	
Athlete	Event	Time	Rank	Time	Rank	Time	Rank	Time	Rank
Licet Hernández; Yislena Hernández	Lightweight double sculls	7:26.43	4 R	8:22.05	5 SC/D	8:27.44	4 FD	7:50.21	19

Qualification Legend: FA=Final A (medal); FB=Final B (non-medal); FC=Final C (non-medal); FD=Final D (non-medal); FE=Final E (non-medal); FF=Final F (non-medal); SA/B=Semifinals A/B; SC/D=Semifinals C/D; SE/F=Semifinals E/F; QF=Quarterfinals; R=Repechage

== Shooting ==
Cuban shooters have achieved quota places for the following events by virtue of their best finishes at the 2014 and 2015 ISSF World Championships, the 2015 ISSF World Cup series, the American Continental Championships, and the Pan American Games, as long as they obtained a minimum qualifying score (MQS) by March 31, 2016. A total of six Cuban shooters were named to the Olympic roster, including London 2012 champion Leuris Pupo (men's 25 m rapid fire pistol) and Olympic bronze medalists Juan Miguel Rodríguez (2004) and Eglis Yaima Cruz (2008).

Men

Athlete	Event	Qualification		Semifinal		Final	
Athlete	Event	Points	Rank	Points	Rank	Points	Rank
Reinier Estpinan	10 m air rifle	610.0	48	—N/a		Did not advance	
Reinier Estpinan	50 m rifle prone	613.6	45	—N/a		Did not advance	
Reinier Estpinan	50 m rifle 3 positions	1157	38	—N/a		Did not advance	
Jorge Grau	10 m air pistol	569	37	—N/a		Did not advance	
Jorge Grau	50 m pistol	546	27	—N/a		Did not advance	
Alexander Molerio	10 m air rifle	607.2	49	—N/a		Did not advance	
Alexander Molerio	50 m rifle 3 positions	1146	42	—N/a		Did not advance	
Leuris Pupo	25 m rapid fire pistol	583	6 Q	—N/a		18	5
Juan Miguel Rodríguez	Skeet	116	26	Did not advance			

Women

Athlete	Event	Qualification		Final	
Athlete	Event	Points	Rank	Points	Rank
Eglis Yaima Cruz	10 m air rifle	412.1	31	Did not advance	
Eglis Yaima Cruz	50 m rifle 3 positions	581	10	Did not advance	
Dianelys Pérez	10 m air rifle	403.5	46	Did not advance	
Dianelys Pérez	50 m rifle 3 positions	568	36	Did not advance	

Qualification Legend: Q = Qualify for the next round; q = Qualify for the bronze medal (shotgun)

== Swimming ==
Cuba has received a Universality invitation from FINA to send two swimmers (one male and one female) to the Olympics.

Athlete	Event	Heat		Semifinal		Final	
Athlete	Event	Time	Rank	Time	Rank	Time	Rank
Luis Vega Torres	Men's 400 m individual medley	4:27.27	26	—N/a		Did not advance	
Elisbet Gámez	Women's 200 m freestyle	2:01.08	36	Did not advance			

== Table tennis ==
Cuba has entered two athletes into the table tennis competition at the Games. Jorge Campos and 2012 Olympian Andy Pereira had secured their Olympic spots in the men's singles by virtue of their top six finish at the Latin American Qualification Tournament in Santiago, Chile.

Athlete	Event	Preliminary	Round 1	Round 2	Round 3	Round of 16	Quarterfinals	Semifinals	Final	
Athlete	Event	Opposition Result	Opposition Result	Opposition Result	Opposition Result	Opposition Result	Opposition Result	Opposition Result	Opposition Result	Rank
Jorge Campos	Men's singles	Bye	Wang (CAN); L 2–4	Did not advance						
Andy Pereira	Men's singles	Bye	Calderano (BRA); L 0–4	Did not advance						

== Taekwondo ==
Cuba entered one athlete into the taekwondo competition at the Olympics. Rafael Alba secured a place in the men's heavyweight category (+80 kg) by virtue of his top two finish at the 2016 Pan American Qualification Tournament in Aguascalientes, Mexico.

Athlete	Event	Round of 16	Quarterfinals	Semifinals	Repechage	Final / BM	
Athlete	Event	Opposition Result	Opposition Result	Opposition Result	Opposition Result	Opposition Result	Rank
Rafael Alba	Men's +80 kg	Trabelsi (TUN); W 13–4	Shokin (UZB); L 1–1 SUP	Did not advance			

== Volleyball ==
=== Beach ===
Cuba men's beach volleyball team qualified directly for the Olympics by winning the final match over Canada at the 2016 NORCECA Continental Cup in Guaymas, Mexico.

Athlete	Event	Preliminary round	Standing	Round of 16	Quarterfinals	Semifinals	Final / BM	
Athlete	Event	Opposition Score	Standing	Opposition Score	Opposition Score	Opposition Score	Opposition Score	Rank
Nivaldo Díaz; Sergio González	Men's	Pool D Oliveira – Solberg (BRA); W 2 – 1 (24–22, 21–23, 15–13); Samoilovs – Šmēdiņš (LAT); W 2 – 1 (23–21, 19–21, 15–9); Saxton – Schalk (CAN); W 2 – 0 (21–15, 21–18)	1 Q	Doppler – Horst (AUT); W 2 – 0 (21–17, 21–14)	Krasilnikov – Semenov (RUS); L 1 – 2 (20–22, 24–22, 16–18)	Did not advance		

=== Indoor ===
==== Men's tournament ====
Cuba men's volleyball team qualified for the Olympics by attaining a top finish and securing a lone outright berth at the NORCECA Olympic Qualifying Tournament in Edmonton, Canada, signifying the team's Olympic comeback for the first time since Sydney 2000.

Team roster

The following is the Cuba roster in the men's volleyball tournament of the 2016 Summer Olympics.

Head coach: Nicolás Vives

No.	Name	Date of birth	Height	Weight	Spike	Block	2015–16 club
1	Yosvani González	18 April 1988	1.96 m (6 ft 5 in)	85 kg (187 lb)	345 cm (136 in)	330 cm (130 in)	(Cuba) La Habana
2	Osniel Melgarejo	18 December 1997	1.95 m (6 ft 5 in)	83 kg (183 lb)	345 cm (136 in)	320 cm (130 in)	(Cuba) Sancti Spiritus
4	Javier Jiménez (c)	16 November 1989	1.98 m (6 ft 6 in)	89 kg (196 lb)	352 cm (139 in)	345 cm (136 in)	(Greece) P.A.O.K. Thessaloniki
5	Javier Concepción	27 December 1997	2.00 m (6 ft 7 in)	84 kg (185 lb)	356 cm (140 in)	350 cm (140 in)	(Cuba) La Habana
6	Osniel Rendón	26 October 1996	2.02 m (6 ft 8 in)	90 kg (200 lb)	350 cm (140 in)	340 cm (130 in)	(Cuba) Matanzas
7	Yonder García (L)	26 March 1993	1.83 m (6 ft 0 in)	78 kg (172 lb)	325 cm (128 in)	320 cm (130 in)	(Cuba) Ciudad Habana
9	Liván Osoria	5 February 1994	2.01 m (6 ft 7 in)	96 kg (212 lb)	345 cm (136 in)	325 cm (128 in)	Santiago de Cuba
10	Darien Ferrer	31 October 1982	2.02 m (6 ft 8 in)	90 kg (200 lb)	350 cm (140 in)	348 cm (137 in)	Santiago de Cuba
13	Mario Rivera	25 October 1982	1.80 m (5 ft 11 in)	92 kg (203 lb)	343 cm (135 in)	323 cm (127 in)	(Cuba) Pinar del Río
17	Reinier Rojas	30 July 1986	1.90 m (6 ft 3 in)	78 kg (172 lb)	335 cm (132 in)	325 cm (128 in)	(Cuba) La Habana
18	Miguel Ángel López	25 March 1997	1.89 m (6 ft 2 in)	75 kg (165 lb)	345 cm (136 in)	320 cm (130 in)	(Cuba) Cienfuegos
21	Adrián Goide	26 June 1998	1.91 m (6 ft 3 in)	80 kg (180 lb)	344 cm (135 in)	340 cm (130 in)	(Cuba) Sancti Spiritus

Group play

Pos	Team	Pld	W	L	Pts	SW	SL	SR	SPW	SPL	SPR	Qualification
1	Argentina	5	4	1	12	12	4	3.000	394	335	1.176	Quarterfinals
2	Poland	5	4	1	12	14	5	2.800	447	389	1.149	Quarterfinals
3	Russia	5	4	1	11	13	6	2.167	432	367	1.177	Quarterfinals
4	Iran	5	2	3	7	8	9	0.889	389	392	0.992	Quarterfinals
5	Egypt	5	1	4	3	3	12	0.250	286	362	0.790	
6	Cuba	5	0	5	0	1	15	0.067	300	403	0.744	

Source: FIVB
Rules for classification: Tiebreakers

7 August 2016; 20:30	Russia	3–1	Cuba	Ginásio do Maracanãzinho, Rio de Janeiro; Attendance: 6,287; Referees: Vladimir Simonović (SRB), Rogerio Espicalsky (BRA)
7 August 2016; 20:30	(25–17, 25–19, 22–25, 25–18); Results Statistics			Ginásio do Maracanãzinho, Rio de Janeiro; Attendance: 6,287; Referees: Vladimir Simonović (SRB), Rogerio Espicalsky (BRA)

9 August 2016; 20:30	Cuba	0–3	Egypt	Ginásio do Maracanãzinho, Rio de Janeiro; Attendance: 5,016; Referees: Rogerio Espicalsky (BRA), Denny Cespedes (DOM)
9 August 2016; 20:30	(22–25, 15–25, 22–25); Results Statistics			Ginásio do Maracanãzinho, Rio de Janeiro; Attendance: 5,016; Referees: Rogerio Espicalsky (BRA), Denny Cespedes (DOM)

11 August 2016; 09:30	Iran	3–0	Cuba	Ginásio do Maracanãzinho, Rio de Janeiro; Attendance: 6,625; Referees: Fabrizio Pasquali (ITA), Juray Mokrý (SVK)
11 August 2016; 09:30	(25–21, 31–29, 25–16); Results Statistics			Ginásio do Maracanãzinho, Rio de Janeiro; Attendance: 6,625; Referees: Fabrizio Pasquali (ITA), Juray Mokrý (SVK)

13 August 2016; 11:35	Argentina	3–0	Cuba	Ginásio do Maracanãzinho, Rio de Janeiro; Attendance: 7,428; Referees: Paulo Turci (BRA), Vladimir Simonović (SRB)
13 August 2016; 11:35	(25–16, 25–14, 25–16); Results Statistics			Ginásio do Maracanãzinho, Rio de Janeiro; Attendance: 7,428; Referees: Paulo Turci (BRA), Vladimir Simonović (SRB)

15 August 2016; 17:05	Poland	3–0	Cuba	Ginásio do Maracanãzinho, Rio de Janeiro; Attendance: 8,175; Referees: Vladimir Simonović (SRB), Ibrahim Al-Naama (QAT)
15 August 2016; 17:05	(25–18, 25–15, 25–17); Results Statistics			Ginásio do Maracanãzinho, Rio de Janeiro; Attendance: 8,175; Referees: Vladimir Simonović (SRB), Ibrahim Al-Naama (QAT)

== Weightlifting ==
Cuba has qualified one male and one female weightlifter for the Rio Olympics by virtue of a top seven national finish (for men) and top four (for women), respectively, at the 2016 Pan American Championships. The team must allocate these places to individual athletes by June 20, 2016.

Athlete	Event	Snatch		Clean & Jerk		Total	Rank
Athlete	Event	Result	Rank	Result	Rank	Total	Rank
Yoelmis Hernández	Men's −85 kg	150	=12	200	7	350	9
Marina Rodríguez	Women's −63 kg	94	8	121	5	215	8

== Wrestling ==
Cuba has qualified a total of ten wrestlers for each of the following weight classes into the Olympic competition. Two of them had booked Olympic spots each in the men's Greco Roman (59 & 130 kg) at the 2015 World Championships, while the majority of Olympic berths were awarded to the Cuban wrestlers, who progressed to the top two finals at the 2016 Pan American Qualification Tournament.

Key:

- VT – Victory by Fall.
- PP – Decision by Points – the loser with technical points.
- PO – Decision by Points – the loser without technical points.
- ST – Technical superiority – the loser without technical points and a margin of victory of at least 8 (Greco-Roman) or 10 (freestyle) points.
- SP – Technical superiority – the loser with technical points and a margin of victory of at least 8 (Greco-Roman) or 10 (freestyle) points.
- VA – Decision by withdrawal

Men's freestyle

Athlete	Event	Qualification	Round of 16	Quarterfinal	Semifinal	Repechage 1	Repechage 2	Final / BM	
Athlete	Event	Opposition Result	Opposition Result	Opposition Result	Opposition Result	Opposition Result	Opposition Result	Opposition Result	Rank
Yowlys Bonne	−57 kg	Rakhmonov (UZB); W 4–0 ^{ST}	Diatta (SEN); W 3–1 ^{PP}	Higuchi (JPN); L 1–3 ^{PP}	Did not advance	Bye	Yang K-i (PRK); W 4–1 ^{SP}	Rahimi (IRI); L 0–5 ^{VT}	5
Alejandro Valdés	−65 kg	Kaya (TUR); W 5–0 ^{VT}	Ramonov (RUS); L 1–3 ^{PP}	Did not advance		Garcia (CAN); L 1–3 ^{PP}	Did not advance		7
Liván López	−74 kg	Friev (ESP); W 3–1 ^{PP}	Usserbayev (KAZ); L 1–3 ^{PP}	Did not advance					10
Reineris Salas	−86 kg	Bye	Kim G-u (KOR); W 3–1 ^{PP}	Yaşar (TUR); L 1–3 ^{PP}	Did not advance	Bye	Espinal (PUR); W 3–1 ^{PP}	Cox (USA); L 0–5 ^{VA}	5
Javier Cortina	−97 kg	Bye	Snyder (USA); L 1–3 ^{PP}	Did not advance		Bye	Saritov (ROU); L 1–3 ^{PP}	Did not advance	10

Men's Greco-Roman

Athlete	Event	Qualification	Round of 16	Quarterfinal	Semifinal	Repechage 1	Repechage 2	Final / BM	
Athlete	Event	Opposition Result	Opposition Result	Opposition Result	Opposition Result	Opposition Result	Opposition Result	Opposition Result	Rank
Ismael Borrero	−59 kg	Bye	Eraliev (KGZ); W 3–1 ^{PP}	Wang Lm (CHN); W 4–0 ^{ST}	Tasmuradov (UZB); W 3–1 ^{PP}	Bye		Ota (JPN); W 4–0 ^{ST}	1st place, gold medalist(s)
Miguel Martínez	−66 kg	Chunayev (AZE); L 1–3 ^{PP}	Did not advance						12
Yurisandy Hernández	−75 kg	Bye	Bisek (USA); L 0–3 ^{PO}	Did not advance					17
Yasmany Lugo	−98 kg	Bye	Xiao D (CHN); W 3–0 ^{PO}	Rezaei (IRI); W 3–0 ^{PO}	Schön (SWE); W 3–0 ^{PO}	Bye		Aleksanyan (ARM); L 0–3 ^{PO}	2nd place, silver medalist(s)
Mijaín López	−130 kg	Bye	Nabi (EST); W 3–0 ^{PO}	Eurén (SWE); W 3–0 ^{PO}	Semenov (RUS); W 3–0 ^{PO}	Bye		Kayaalp (TUR); W 3–0 ^{PO}	1st place, gold medalist(s)

== See also ==
- Cuba at the 2015 Pan American Games
- Cuba at the 2016 Summer Paralympics
