= Wrestling at the 2016 Summer Olympics – Women's freestyle 53 kg =

Women's freestyle 53 kg at the Games of the XXXI Olympiad
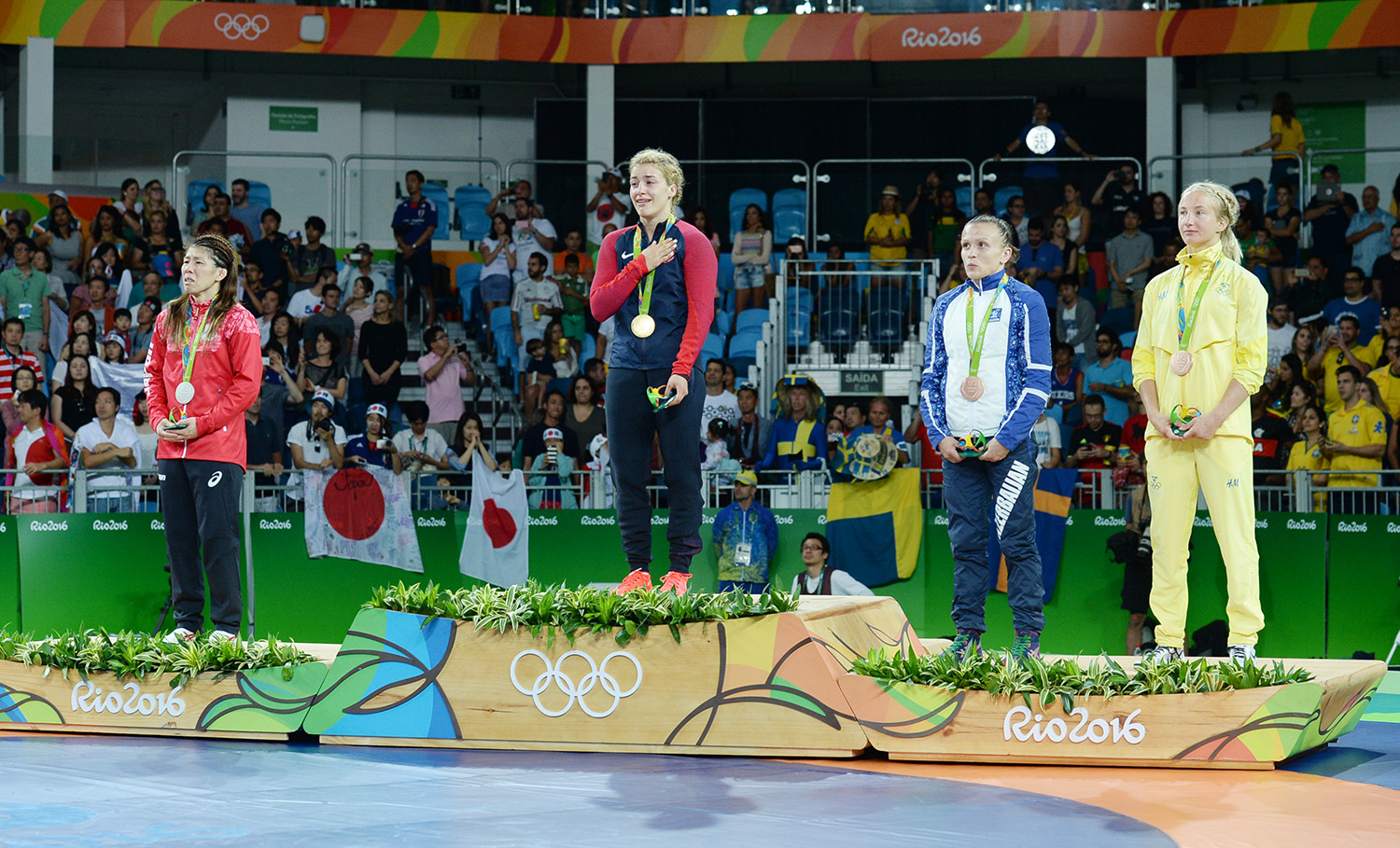
- Medalists
- Venue: Carioca Arena 2
- Date: 18 August 2016
- Competitors: 19 from 19 nations

Medalists
1st place, gold medalist(s)		Helen Maroulis	United States
2nd place, silver medalist(s)		Saori Yoshida	Japan
3rd place, bronze medalist(s)		Nataliya Synyshyn	Azerbaijan
3rd place, bronze medalist(s)		Sofia Mattsson	Sweden

Women's freestyle 53 kilograms competition at the 2016 Summer Olympics in Rio de Janeiro, Brazil, took place on August 18 at the Carioca Arena 2 in Barra da Tijuca. Nineteen competitors from as many nations participated in the competition.

This freestyle wrestling competition consists of a single-elimination tournament, with a repechage used to determine the winner of two bronze medals. The two finalists face off for gold and silver medals. Each wrestler who loses to one of the two finalists moves into the repechage, culminating in a pair of bronze medal matches featuring the semifinal losers each facing the remaining repechage opponent from their half of the bracket.

== Schedule ==
All times are Brasília Standard Time (UTC−03:00)

Date	Time	Event
18 August 2016	10:00	Qualification rounds
18 August 2016	16:00	Repechage
18 August 2016	17:00	Finals

== Results ==
Legend

- F — Won by fall

=== Final ===
Final
Saori Yoshida (JPN)	1
Helen Maroulis (USA)	4

=== Top half ===
Qualifications

1/8 finals
Saori Yoshida (JPN)	4
Nataliya Synyshyn (AZE)	0
Isabelle Sambou (SEN)	5^{F}
Nguyễn Thị Lụa (VIE)	0
Maria Prevolaraki (GRE)	5
Babita Kumari (IND)	1
Betzabeth Argüello (VEN)	8^{F}
Joseph Essombe (CMR)	0

1/4 finals
Saori Yoshida (JPN)	9
Isabelle Sambou (SEN)	0
Maria Prevolaraki (GRE)	3
Betzabeth Argüello (VEN)	6

Semifinals
Saori Yoshida (JPN)	6
Betzabeth Argüello (VEN)	0

=== Bottom half ===
Qualifications
Jong Myong-suk (PRK)	11
Jillian Gallays (CAN)	0
Yuliya Khavaldzhy (UKR)	1
Helen Maroulis (USA)	12
Zhong Xuechun (CHN)	6
Nina Hemmer (GER)	1

1/8 finals
Sofia Mattsson (SWE)	8^{F}
Odunayo Adekuoroye (NGR)	0
Katarzyna Krawczyk (POL)	8
Erdenechimegiin Sumiyaa (MGL)	6
Bediha Gün (TUR)	0
Jong Myong-suk (PRK)	10
Helen Maroulis (USA)	10
Zhong Xuechun (CHN)	0

1/4 finals
Sofia Mattsson (SWE)	10
Katarzyna Krawczyk (POL)	3
Jong Myong-suk (PRK)	4
Helen Maroulis (USA)	7

Semifinals
Sofia Mattsson (SWE)	0
Helen Maroulis (USA)	8^{F}

=== Repechage ===
Repechage round 1
Yuliya Khavaldzhy (UKR)	1
Zhong Xuechun (CHN)	11

Repechage round 2
Nataliya Synyshyn (AZE)	4
Isabelle Sambou (SEN)	0
Zhong Xuechun (CHN)	5
Jong Myong-suk (PRK)	5

Bronze medals
Nataliya Synyshyn (AZE)	2
Betzabeth Argüello (VEN)	1
Zhong Xuechun (CHN)	0
Sofia Mattsson (SWE)	6^{F}

== Final standing ==
Rank	Athlete
1st place, gold medalist(s)	Helen Maroulis (USA)
2nd place, silver medalist(s)	Saori Yoshida (JPN)
3rd place, bronze medalist(s)	Nataliya Synyshyn (AZE)
3rd place, bronze medalist(s)	Sofia Mattsson (SWE)
5	Betzabeth Argüello (VEN)
5	Zhong Xuechun (CHN)
7	Jong Myong-suk (PRK)
8	Isabelle Sambou (SEN)
9	Katarzyna Krawczyk (POL)
10	Maria Prevolaraki (GRE)
11	Yuliya Khavaldzhy (UKR)
12	Erdenechimegiin Sumiyaa (MGL)
13	Babita Kumari (IND)
14	Nina Hemmer (GER)
15	Nguyễn Thị Lụa (VIE)
16	Joseph Essombe (CMR)
16	Odunayo Adekuoroye (NGR)
18	Bediha Gün (TUR)
19	Jillian Gallays (CAN)
