= 2015 World Wrestling Championships – Women's freestyle 53 kg =

Women's freestyle 53 kg at the 2015 World Championships
- Venue: Orleans Arena
- Dates: 9 September 2015
- Competitors: 40 from 40 nations

Medalists
gold medal	Saori Yoshida	Japan
silver medal	Sofia Mattsson	Sweden
bronze medal	Jong Myong-suk	North Korea
bronze medal	Odunayo Adekuoroye	Nigeria

The women's freestyle 53 kilograms is a competition featured at the 2015 World Wrestling Championships, and was held in Las Vegas, United States on 9 September 2015.

== Results ==
Legend

- F — Won by fall

=== Finals ===
Semifinals		Final
Jong Myong-suk (PRK)	2
Saori Yoshida (JPN)	5	Saori Yoshida (JPN)	2
Sofia Mattsson (SWE)	4^{F}	Sofia Mattsson (SWE)	1
Zhong Xuechun (CHN)	0

=== Top half ===
==== Section 1 ====
Round of 64

Round of 32
Lee Shin-hye (KOR)	5
Zhuldyz Eshimova (KAZ)	7^{F}
Jong Myong-suk (PRK)	11
Nes Marie Rodríguez (PUR)	0
Natalia Budu (MDA)	4^{F}
Maria Prevolaraki (GRE)	0
Mélanie Lesaffre (FRA)	12
Brianne Barry (CAN)	1

Round of 16
Zhuldyz Eshimova (KAZ)	0
Jong Myong-suk (PRK)	2
Natalia Budu (MDA)	2
Mélanie Lesaffre (FRA)	8

Quarterfinals
Jong Myong-suk (PRK)	4
Mélanie Lesaffre (FRA)	2

==== Section 2 ====
Round of 64

Round of 32
Zukhra Mustanova (UZB)	0
Nguyễn Thị Lụa (VIE)	4^{F}
Saori Yoshida (JPN)	6^{F}
Nadine Tokar (SUI)	0
Vânia Guerreiro (POR)	3^{F}
Simona Pricop (ROU)	2
Anzhela Dorogan (AZE)	5
Lenka Hocková (CZE)	0

Round of 16
Nguyễn Thị Lụa (VIE)	0
Saori Yoshida (JPN)	12
Vânia Guerreiro (POR)	0
Anzhela Dorogan (AZE)	11

Quarterfinals
Saori Yoshida (JPN)	11
Anzhela Dorogan (AZE)	0

=== Bottom half ===
==== Section 3 ====
Round of 64

Round of 32
Natalia Malysheva (RUS)	2
Odunayo Adekuoroye (NGR)	5
Lilya Horishna (UKR)	10^{F}
Giullia Penalber (BRA)	0
Sofia Mattsson (SWE)	6^{F}
Nadzeya Shushko (BLR)	2
Merve Kenger (TUR)	0
Betzabeth Argüello (VEN)	4^{F}

Round of 16
Odunayo Adekuoroye (NGR)	14
Lilya Horishna (UKR)	3
Sofia Mattsson (SWE)	10^{F}
Betzabeth Argüello (VEN)	0

Quarterfinals
Odunayo Adekuoroye (NGR)	2
Sofia Mattsson (SWE)	4^{F}

==== Section 4 ====
Round of 64
Aidé Cuero (COL)	4
Babita Kumari (IND)	17
Chiu Hsin-ju (TPE)	2
Karima Sánchez (ESP)	6^{F}
Mercédesz Dénes (HUN)	0
Nina Hemmer (GER)	8^{F}
Tiina Ylinen (FIN)	10^{F}
Patrizia Liuzzi (ITA)	2
Zhong Xuechun (CHN)	2^{F}
Mpho Madi (RSA)	0
Whitney Conder (USA)	2^{F}
Isabelle Sambou (SEN)	0
Davaasükhiin Otgontsetseg (MGL)	12
Katarzyna Krawczyk (POL)	0
Rozalia Tilegenova (KGZ)	2
Alma Valencia (MEX)	8^{F}

Round of 32
Babita Kumari (IND)	10
Karima Sánchez (ESP)	0
Nina Hemmer (GER)	10
Tiina Ylinen (FIN)	0
Zhong Xuechun (CHN)	6
Whitney Conder (USA)	2
Davaasükhiin Otgontsetseg (MGL)	12
Alma Valencia (MEX)	10

Round of 16
Babita Kumari (IND)	13
Nina Hemmer (GER)	6
Zhong Xuechun (CHN)	5
Davaasükhiin Otgontsetseg (MGL)	3

Quarterfinals
Babita Kumari (IND)	2
Zhong Xuechun (CHN)	6

=== Repechage ===
Repechage round 2
Nadine Tokar (SUI)	0
Nguyễn Thị Lụa (VIE)	11
Nadzeya Shushko (BLR)	7
Betzabeth Argüello (VEN)	2

Repechage round 3
Nguyễn Thị Lụa (VIE)	2
Anzhela Dorogan (AZE)	3^{F}
Nadzeya Shushko (BLR)	0
Odunayo Adekuoroye (NGR)	10

Bronze medals
Anzhela Dorogan (AZE)	2
Jong Myong-suk (PRK)	13
Odunayo Adekuoroye (NGR)	4^{F}
Zhong Xuechun (CHN)	0
