= 2014 World Wrestling Championships – Women's freestyle 53 kg =

Women's freestyle 53 kg at the 2014 World Championships
- Venue: Gymnastics Sport Palace
- Dates: 11 September 2014
- Competitors: 28 from 28 nations

Medalists
gold medal	Saori Yoshida	Japan
silver medal	Sofia Mattsson	Sweden
bronze medal	Jillian Gallays	Canada
bronze medal	Jong Myong-suk	North Korea

The Women's freestyle 53 kilograms is a competition featured at the 2014 World Wrestling Championships, and was held in Tashkent, Uzbekistan on 11 September 2014.

This freestyle wrestling competition consisted of a single-elimination tournament, with a repechage used to determine the winners of two bronze medals.

== Results ==
Legend

- F — Won by fall

=== Final ===
Final
Saori Yoshida (JPN)	6
Sofia Mattsson (SWE)	0

=== Top half ===
Round of 32
Yuliya Blahinya (UKR)	4
Betzabeth Argüello (VEN)	4
Ana Maria Pavăl (ROU)	3
Laura Mertens (GER)	4
Lee Shin-hye (KOR)	11
Merve Kenger (TUR)	1
Jillian Gallays (CAN)	10
Nadzeya Shushko (BLR)	0

Round of 16
Saori Yoshida (JPN)	4^{F}
Pang Qianyu (CHN)	0
Natalia Malysheva (RUS)	3
Roksana Zasina (POL)	1
Yuliya Blahinya (UKR)	11
Laura Mertens (GER)	1
Lee Shin-hye (KOR)	0
Jillian Gallays (CAN)	10^{F}

Quarterfinals
Saori Yoshida (JPN)	10
Natalia Malysheva (RUS)	0
Yuliya Blahinya (UKR)	5
Jillian Gallays (CAN)	6

Semifinals
Saori Yoshida (JPN)	4^{F}
Jillian Gallays (CAN)	0

=== Bottom half ===
Round of 32
Luisa Valverde (ECU)	0
Sofia Mattsson (SWE)	7^{F}
Jong Myong-suk (PRK)	10
Zukhra Mustanova (UZB)	0
Whitney Conder (USA)	6
Tatiana Debien (FRA)	0
Nirmala Devi (IND)	0
Erdenechimegiin Sumiyaa (MGL)	4^{F}
Natalia Budu (MDA)	9
Maria Prevolaraki (GRE)	5
Anzhela Dorogan (AZE)	3
Isabelle Sambou (SEN)	2
Alma Valencia (MEX)	12
Zhuldyz Eshimova (KAZ)	0
Vânia Guerreiro (POR)	10
Karalina Tjapko (LAT)	8

Round of 16
Sofia Mattsson (SWE)	8
Jong Myong-suk (PRK)	0
Whitney Conder (USA)	4
Erdenechimegiin Sumiyaa (MGL)	4
Natalia Budu (MDA)	6
Anzhela Dorogan (AZE)	3
Alma Valencia (MEX)	10
Vânia Guerreiro (POR)	0

Quarterfinals
Sofia Mattsson (SWE)	8^{F}
Whitney Conder (USA)	0
Natalia Budu (MDA)	7^{F}
Alma Valencia (MEX)	5

Semifinals
Sofia Mattsson (SWE)	10
Natalia Budu (MDA)	0

=== Repechage ===
Repechage round 1
Luisa Valverde (ECU)	0
Jong Myong-suk (PRK)	8

Repechage round 2
Pang Qianyu (CHN)	0
Natalia Malysheva (RUS)	4
Jong Myong-suk (PRK)	8
Whitney Conder (USA)	2

Bronze medals
Natalia Malysheva (RUS)	2
Jillian Gallays (CAN)	6
Jong Myong-suk (PRK)	11
Natalia Budu (MDA)	5
