= Merve Kenger =

Turkish freestyle wrestler

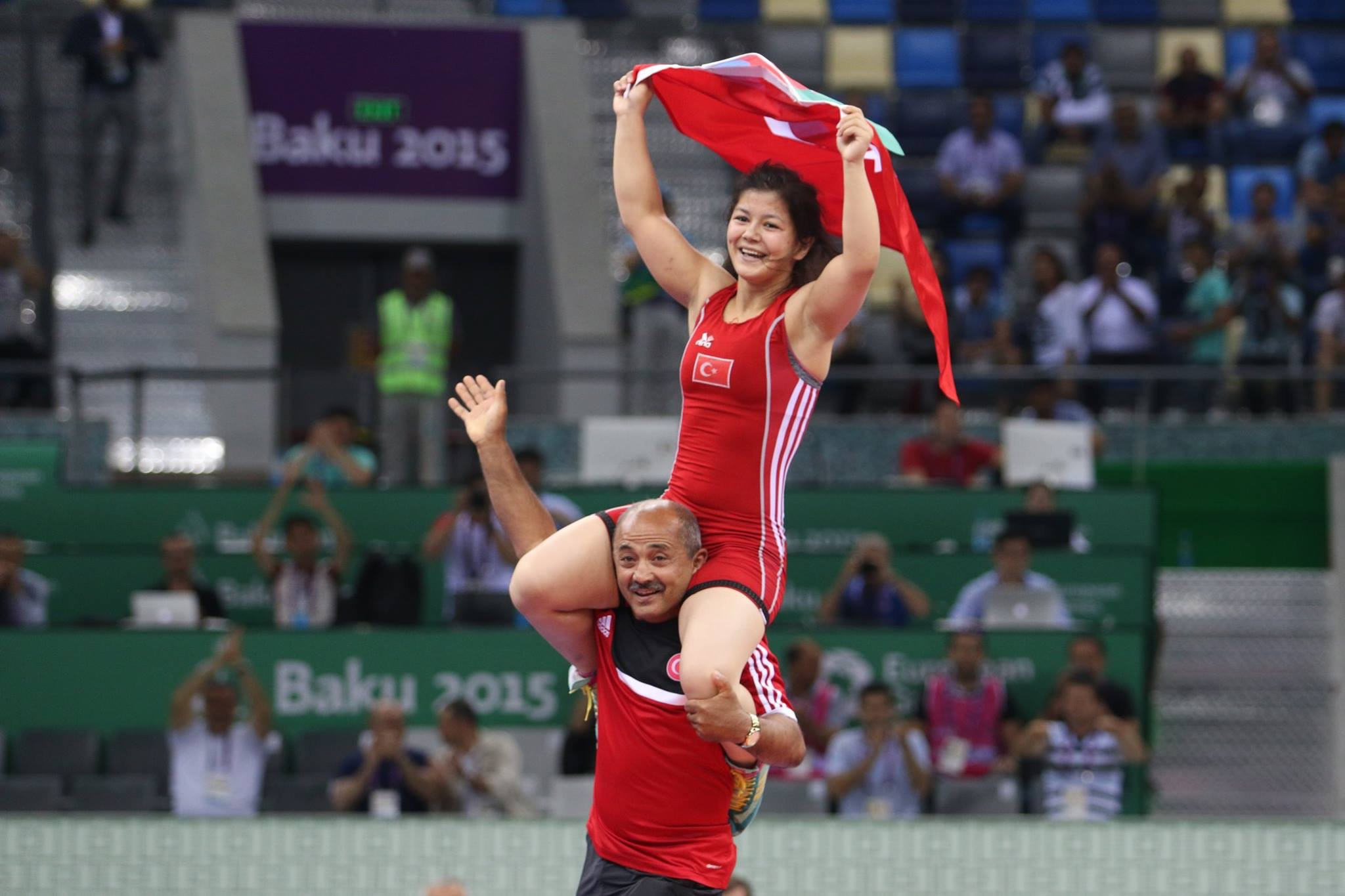
- Merve Kenger being carried around by her team coach

Personal information
- Born: 10 October 1993 (age 32)
- Height: 156 cm (5 ft 1 in)

Sport
- Country: Turkey
- Sport: Amateur wrestling
- Event: Freestyle
Medal record
Women's freestyle wrestling
Representing Turkey
European Games
Bronze medal – third place	2015 Baku	53 kg

Merve Kenger (born 10 October 1993) is a Turkish freestyle wrestler. She represented Turkey at the 2015 European Games held in Baku, Azerbaijan and she won one of the bronze medals in the 53 kg event.

In 2014, she competed in the women's freestyle 53 kg event at the World Wrestling Championships held in Tashkent, Uzbekistan. She also competed in the women's freestyle 53 kg event at the 2015 World Wrestling Championships held in Las Vegas, United States.

== Achievements ==
Year	Tournament	Location	Result	Event
2015	European Games	Baku, Azerbaijan	3rd	Freestyle 53 kg
