= Zhong Xuechun =

Chinese freestyle wrestler (born 1994)

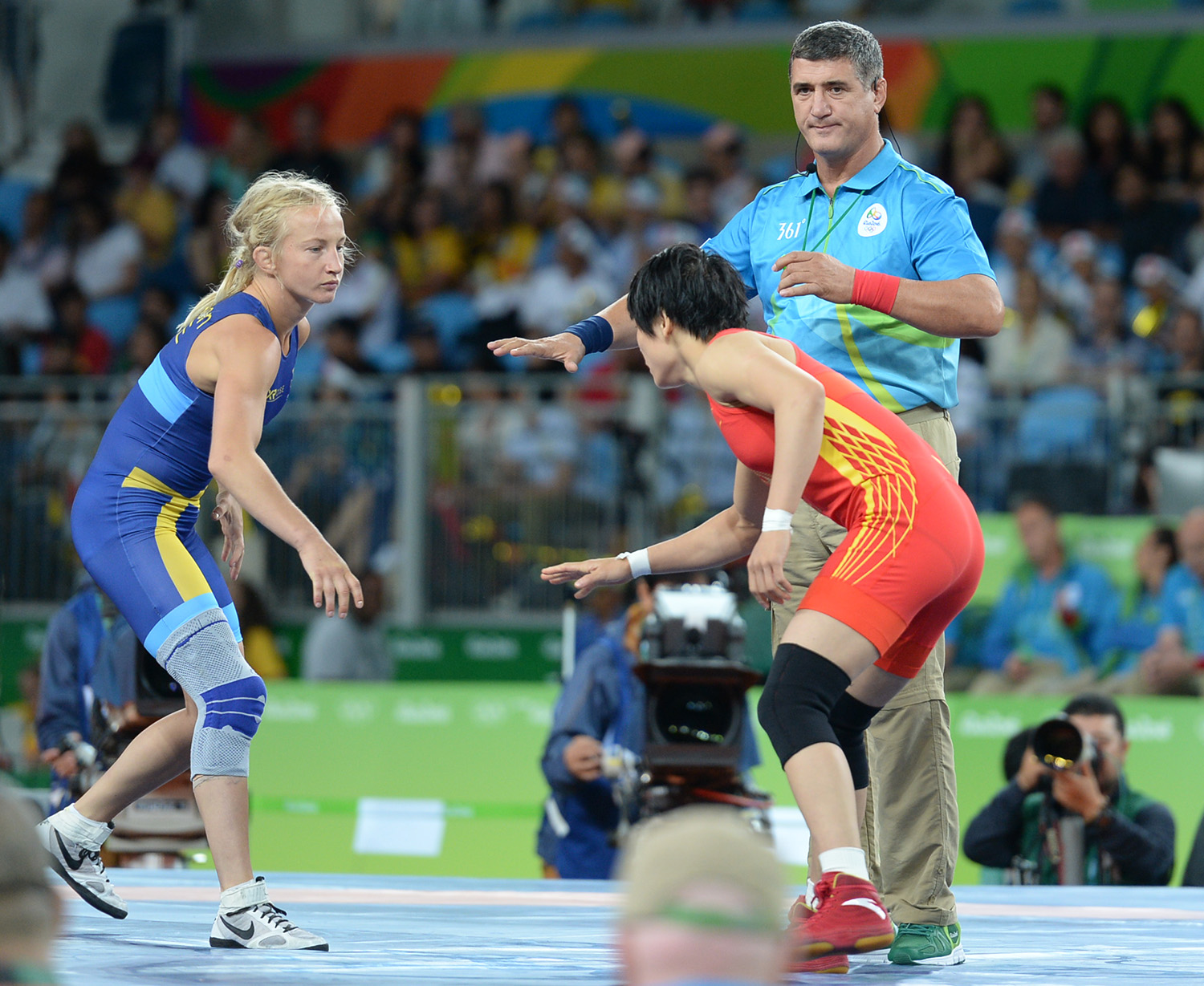
Zhong (right) against Mattsson during the 2016 Olympics

Zhong Xuechun (born January 18, 1994) is a Chinese freestyle wrestler.

== Professional career ==
She competed in the Women's Freestyle 53 kg event at the 2016 Summer Olympics, in which she lost the bronze medal match to Sofia Mattsson.

In 2015, she competed in the Women's Freestyle 53 kg event at the 2015 World Wrestling Championships held in Las Vegas, United States.
