= Eduardo Gajardo =

Chilean wrestler (born 1989)

Eduardo Ivan Gajardo Meneses
Personal information
- Born: 1989 (age 36–37) Rancagua, Chile
- Weight: 86 kg (190 lb)

Sport
- Sport: Amateur wrestling
- Event: Freestyle
Medal record
Men's Freestyle wrestling
Representing Chile
Pan American Championships
Bronze medal – third place	2015 Santiago	74 kg
South American Games
Bronze medal – third place	2018 Cochabamba	86 kg
Bolivarian Games
Silver medal – second place	2022 Valledupar	86 kg

Eduardo Ivan Gajardo Meneses (born 1990) is a Chilean freestyle wrestler who competes at the 86 kg weight class.

== Career ==
Gajardo had been training judo since he was 8 years-old and later transitioned to wrestling when he was 17.

He had his first international competition in at the Pan American Championships of 2011, in which he placed 11th. Since then, he has competed in multiple internationals tournaments and has collected multiple medals in competitions such as the South American Games and the Pan American Championships.

He won the silver medal in his event at the 2022 Bolivarian Games held in Valledupar, Colombia.

== Major results ==
Year	Tournament	Location	Result	Event
2011	Pan American Championships	Rionegro, Colombia	11th	Freestyle 74 kg
2011	South American Championships	Buenos Aires, Argentina	5th	Freestyle 74 kg
2012	Pan American Championships	(United States) Colorado Springs, Colorado	7th	Freestyle 74 kg
2012	Pan American Olympic Qualification Tournament	(United States) Kissimmee, Florida	3rd	Freestyle 74 kg
2012	South American Championships	(Peru) Callao, Perú	2nd	Freestyle 74 kg
2013	Pan American Championships	Panama City, Panamá	10th	Freestyle 74 kg
2013	South American Championships	Santiago, Chile	1st	Freestyle 74 kg
2013	Bolivarian Games	Trujillo, Peru	5th	Freestyle 84 kg
2014	South American Games	Santiago, Chile	7th	Freestyle 74 kg
2015	Pan American Championships	Santiago, Chile	3rd	Freestyle 74 kg
2015	Pan American Games	Toronto, Canada	7th	Freestyle 74 kg
2016	Pan American Championships	(United States) Frisco, Texas	7th	Freestyle 74 kg
2016	Pan American Olympic Qualification Tournament	(United States) Frisco, Texas	3rd	Freestyle 74 kg
2018	Pan American Championships	(Peru) Lima, Perú	9th	Freestyle 86 kg
2018	South American Games	Cochabamba, Bolivia	3rd	Freestyle 86 kg
2019	RS - Dan Kolov - Nikola Petrov Tournament	Russe, Bulgaria	19th	Freestyle 86 kg
2019	Pan American Championships	Buenos Aires, Argentina	13th	Freestyle 86 kg
