= Wrestling at the 2015 European Games – Women's freestyle 53 kg =

Women's freestyle 53 kg at the 2015 European Games
- Venue: Heydar Aliyev Arena
- Date: 16 June
- Competitors: 24 from 24 nations

Medalists
gold medal	Anzhela Dorogan	Azerbaijan
silver medal	Roksana Zasina	Poland
bronze medal	Merve Kenger	Turkey
bronze medal	Nadzeya Shushko	Belarus

Women's freestyle 53 kg competition at the 2015 European Games in Baku, Azerbaijan, took place on 16 June at the Heydar Aliyev Arena.

== Schedule ==
All times are Azerbaijan Summer Time (UTC+05:00)

Date	Time	Event
Tuesday, 16 June 2015	10:00	Qualifications
Tuesday, 16 June 2015	11:00	1/8 finals
Tuesday, 16 June 2015	13:00	Quarterfinals
Tuesday, 16 June 2015	13:00	Semifinals
Tuesday, 16 June 2015	15:00	Repechage
Tuesday, 16 June 2015	19:00	Finals

== Results ==
Legend

- F — Won by fall

=== Final ===
Final
(Azerbaijan) Anzhela Dorogan (AZE)	3
(Poland) Roksana Zasina (POL)	2

=== Top half ===
Qualifications

1/8 finals
(Sweden) Fredrika Petersson (SWE)	1
(Romania) Estera Dobre (ROU)	8
(Latvia) Violeta Ponomarjova (LAT)	0
(Moldova) Natalia Budu (MDA)	10^{F}
(Turkey) Merve Kenger (TUR)	2
(Azerbaijan) Anzhela Dorogan (AZE)	8
(Bulgaria) Pepa Dimitrova (BUL)	0
(Hungary) Mercédesz Dénes (HUN)	10

Quarterfinals
(Romania) Estera Dobre (ROU)	0
(Moldova) Natalia Budu (MDA)	4^{F}
(Azerbaijan) Anzhela Dorogan (AZE)	4^{F}
(Hungary) Mercédesz Dénes (HUN)	0

Semifinals
(Moldova) Natalia Budu (MDA)	2
(Azerbaijan) Anzhela Dorogan (AZE)	7^{F}

=== Bottom half ===
Qualifications
(France) Mélanie Lesaffre (FRA)	0
(Russia) Natalia Malysheva (RUS)	6
(Finland) Tiina Ylinen (FIN)	4
(Czech Republic) Lenka Hocková (GBR)	3
(Germany) Eileen Friedrich (GER)	1
(Belarus) Nadzeya Shushko (BLR)	10

1/8 finals
(Switzerland) Nadine Tokar (SUI)	0
(Poland) Roksana Zasina (POL)	11
(Ukraine) Liliya Horishna (UKR)	4^{F}
(Portugal) Vânia Guerreiro (ROU)	1
(Italy) Silvia Felice (AZE)	3
(Russia) Natalia Malysheva (RUS)	3
(Finland) Tiina Ylinen (FIN)	0
(Belarus) Nadzeya Shushko (BLR)	8^{F}

Quarterfinals
(Poland) Roksana Zasina (POL)	4^{F}
(Ukraine) Liliya Horishna (UKR)	0
(Russia) Natalia Malysheva (RUS)	1
(Belarus) Nadzeya Shushko (BLR)	1

Semifinals
(Poland) Roksana Zasina (POL)	4
(Belarus) Nadzeya Shushko (BLR)	0

=== Repechage ===
Repechage round 1
(Turkey) Merve Kenger (TUR)	4^{F}
(Hungary) Mercédesz Dénes (HUN)	0
(Switzerland) Nadine Tokar (SUI)	0
(Ukraine) Liliya Horishna (UKR)	10

Bronze medal match
(Turkey) Merve Kenger (TUR)	4^{F}
(Moldova) Natalia Budu (MDA)	6
(Ukraine) Liliya Horishna (UKR)	0
(Belarus) Nadzeya Shushko (BLR)	4^{F}
