= Puerto Rico at the 2016 Summer Olympics =

- IOC code: PUR
- NOC: Puerto Rico Olympic Committee
- Website: www.copur.pr (in Spanish)

in Rio de Janeiro
- Competitors: 40 in 15 sports
- Flag bearer: Jaime Espinal
- Medals Ranked 54th: Gold 1 Silver 0 Bronze 0 Total 1

Summer Olympics appearances (overview)
- 1948; 1952; 1956; 1960; 1964; 1968; 1972; 1976; 1980; 1984; 1988; 1992; 1996; 2000; 2004; 2008; 2012; 2016; 2020; 2024; 2028

Puerto Rico competed at the 2016 Summer Olympics in Rio de Janeiro, Brazil, from 5 to 21 August 2016. This was the nation's eighteenth consecutive appearance at the Summer Olympics.

The Puerto Rico Olympic Committee (Spanish: Comité Olímpico de Puerto Rico, COPUR) sent a team of 40 athletes, 13 men and 27 women, to compete in 15 sports at the Games. The nation's full roster in Rio de Janeiro was 15 athletes larger than those who attended the London Games four years earlier, and also featured more female participants than men for the first time. Puerto Rican athletes made their Olympic debut in table tennis, triathlon, and women's indoor volleyball. Puerto Rico was also represented for the first time in taekwondo after 8 years, diving, equestrian, and tennis after 12 years, and road cycling after 20 years.

Of the 40 participants, twenty-nine of them made their Olympic debut in Rio de Janeiro, including table tennis players Brian Afanador and 15-year-old Adriana Diaz, tennis player Monica Puig, and New York–based taekwondo fighter Crystal Weekes. On the other hand, the remaining eleven athletes on the Puerto Rican squad had past Olympic experience, including swimmer Vanessa García, who became the first woman from her country to compete in four Olympic Games; track star Javier Culson, who captured the bronze medal in the men's 400 m hurdles four years earlier in London; and freestyle wrestler Jaime Espinal (men's 86 kg), who pocketed his country's first silver in nearly three decades. The most successful athlete of the previous Games, Espinal was selected to lead his delegation as the flag bearer in the opening ceremony.

Puerto Rico returned home from Rio de Janeiro with its first ever gold medal in Olympic history. It was awarded to tennis player Puig, who surprisingly defeated Germany's world-ranked Angelique Kerber in the final of the women's singles tournament. Two Puerto Rican athletes, however, came closest to join Puig on the podium: platform diver Rafael Quintero, who rounded out his maiden Games with a seventh-place finish, and Culson, who was disqualified in the men's 400 m hurdles final due to a false start.

== Medalists ==
Medal	Name	Sport	Event	Date
Gold	Monica Puig	Tennis	Women's singles	August 13

Medals by sport
Sport	1st place, gold medalist(s)	2nd place, silver medalist(s)	3rd place, bronze medalist(s)	Total
Tennis	1	0	0	1
Total	1	0	0	1

Medals by date
Date	1st place, gold medalist(s)	2nd place, silver medalist(s)	3rd place, bronze medalist(s)	Total
August 13	1	0	0	0
Total	1	0	0	1

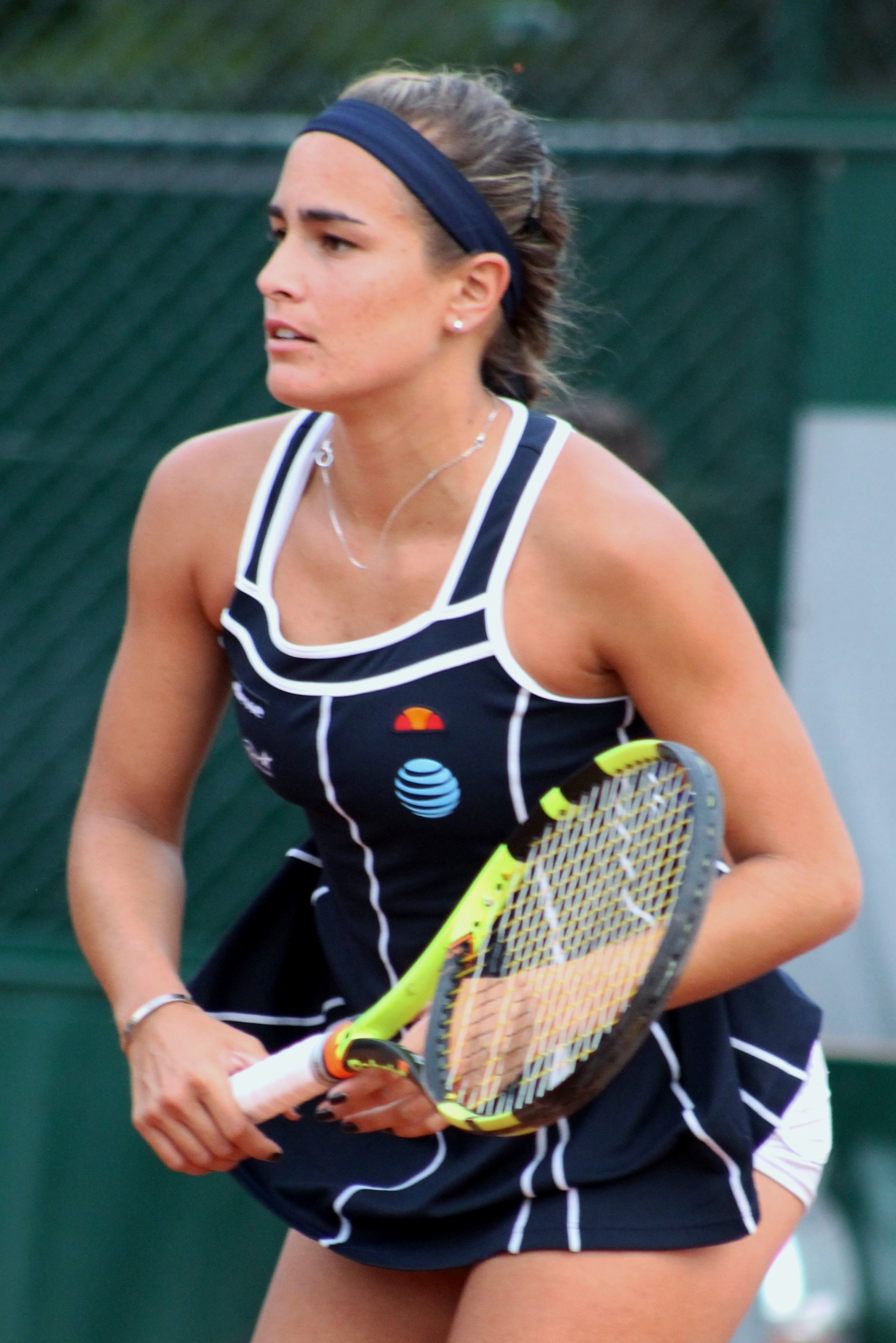
Tennis player Monica Puig won Puerto Rico's first ever Olympic gold medal.

== Athletics (track and field) ==
Puerto Rican athletes achieved qualifying standards in the following athletics events (up to a maximum of 3 athletes in each event):

Key

- Note–Ranks given for track events are within the athlete's heat only
- Q = Qualified for the next round
- q = Qualified for the next round as a fastest loser or, in field events, by position without achieving the qualifying target
- NR = National record
- N/A = Round not applicable for the event
- Bye = Athlete not required to compete in round
- NM = No mark

Track & road events
Men

Athlete	Event	Heat		Semifinal		Final	
Athlete	Event	Result	Rank	Result	Rank	Result	Rank
Eric Alejandro	400 m hurdles	49.54	2 Q	49.95	7	Did not advance	
Andrés Arroyo	800 m	1:46.17	3 Q	1:46.74	7	Did not advance	
Javier Culson	400 m hurdles	48.53	2 Q	48.46	2 Q	DSQ	
Wesley Vázquez	800 m	1:46.96	5	Did not advance			

Women

Athlete	Event	Heat		Semifinal		Final	
Athlete	Event	Result	Rank	Result	Rank	Result	Rank
Grace Claxton	400 m hurdles	56.40	3 Q	55.85 PB	5	Did not advance	
Celiangeli Morales	200 m	23.00 PB	5	Did not advance			
Jasmine Quinn	100 m hurdles	12.70	1 Q	DSQ		Did not advance	
Beverly Ramos	Marathon	—N/a				2:43:52	71

Field events

Athlete	Event	Qualification		Final	
Athlete	Event	Distance	Position	Distance	Position
Luis Castro	Men's high jump	2.26	=12 q	2.25	13
David Adley Smith II	Men's high jump	2.26	23	Did not advance	
Diamara Planell	Women's pole vault	4.15	=29	Did not advance	

Combined events – Women's heptathlon

Athlete	Event	100H	HJ	SP	200 m	LJ	JT	800 m	Final	Rank
Alysbeth Felix	Result	14.07	1.68	11.36	24.74	6.22	40.17 PB	2:15.32	5805	26
Alysbeth Felix	Points	968	830	619	911	918	671	888	5805	26

== Boxing ==
Puerto Rico entered one boxer to compete in the men's flyweight division into the Olympic boxing tournament. 2012 Olympian Jeyvier Cintrón had claimed his Olympic spot by finishing among the top two boxers in the World Series of Boxing.

Athlete	Event	Round of 32	Round of 16	Quarterfinals	Semifinals	Final	
Athlete	Event	Opposition Result	Opposition Result	Opposition Result	Opposition Result	Opposition Result	Rank
Jeyvier Cintrón	Men's flyweight	Sattibayev (KAZ); L 1–2	Did not advance				

== Cycling ==
=== Road ===
Puerto Rico was invited by the International Cycling Union to enter one rider in the men's Olympic road race by virtue of his overall individual ranking in the 2015 UCI America Tour, and by occupying one of the four unused berths from the 2015 UCI World Tour, signifying the nation's return to the sport for the first time since 1996.

Athlete	Event	Time	Rank
Brian Babilonia	Men's road race	Did not finish	

== Diving ==
Puerto Rico has entered one diver into the Olympic competition by virtue of a top 18 finish at the 2016 FINA World Cup series.

Athlete	Event	Preliminaries		Semifinals		Final	
Athlete	Event	Points	Rank	Points	Rank	Points	Rank
Rafael Quintero	Men's 10 m platform	456.55	10 Q	471.20	7 Q	485.35	7

== Equestrian ==
Puerto Rico has entered one eventing rider into the Olympic equestrian competition by virtue of a top two finish from a combined group of North, Central, & South America in the individual FEI Olympic rankings. This signified the nation's Olympic return to the sport of equestrian for the first time since 2004.

=== Eventing ===
Athlete	Horse	Event	Dressage		Cross-country			Jumping						Total	
Athlete	Horse	Event	Dressage		Cross-country			Qualifier			Final			Total	
Athlete	Horse	Event	Penalties	Rank	Penalties	Total	Rank	Penalties	Total	Rank	Penalties	Total	Rank	Penalties	Rank
Lauren Billys	Castle Larchfield Purdy	Individual	56.00	55	88.40	144.40	45	11.00	155.40	44	Did not advance			155.40	44

== Judo ==
Puerto Rico has qualified two judokas for each of the following weight classes at the Games. London 2012 Olympian Melissa Mojica was ranked among the top 14 eligible judokas for women in the IJF World Ranking List of May 30, 2016, while María Pérez at women's middleweight (70 kg) earned a continental quota spot from the Pan American region, as the highest-ranked Puerto Rican judoka outside of direct qualifying position.

Athlete	Event	Round of 32	Round of 16	Quarterfinals	Semifinals	Repechage	Final / BM	
Athlete	Event	Opposition Result	Opposition Result	Opposition Result	Opposition Result	Opposition Result	Opposition Result	Rank
María Pérez	Women's −70 kg	Matić (CRO); W 011–000	Alvear (COL); L 000–000 S	Did not advance				
Melissa Mojica	Women's +78 kg	Bye	Sayit (TUR); L 000–102	Did not advance				

== Shooting ==
Puerto Rico has qualified one shooter to compete in the women's rifle events by virtue of her best finish at the 2015 Pan American Games, as long as she obtained a minimum qualifying score (MQS) by March 31, 2016.

Athlete	Event	Qualification		Final	
Athlete	Event	Points	Rank	Points	Rank
Yarimar Mercado	Women's 10 m air rifle	406.6	43	Did not advance	
Yarimar Mercado	Women's 50 m rifle 3 positions	576	24	Did not advance	

Qualification Legend: Q = Qualify for the next round; q = Qualify for the bronze medal (shotgun)

== Swimming ==
Puerto Rican swimmers have so far achieved qualifying standards in the following events (up to a maximum of 2 swimmers in each event at the Olympic Qualifying Time (OQT), and potentially 1 at the Olympic Selection Time (OST)):

Athlete	Event	Heat		Semifinal		Final	
Athlete	Event	Time	Rank	Time	Rank	Time	Rank
Vanessa García	Women's 50 m freestyle	24.94 NR	=22	Did not advance			

== Table tennis ==
Puerto Rico has entered two athletes into the table tennis competition at the Games. Brian Afanador and 15-year-old Adriana Diaz secured their Olympic spots in the men's and women's singles, respectively by virtue of their top six finish at the 2016 Latin American Qualification Tournament in Santiago, Chile.

Athlete	Event	Preliminary	Round 1	Round 2	Round 3	Round of 16	Quarterfinals	Semifinals	Final / BM	
Athlete	Event	Opposition Result	Opposition Result	Opposition Result	Opposition Result	Opposition Result	Opposition Result	Opposition Result	Opposition Result	Rank
Brian Afanador	Men's singles	Saka (CGO); W 4–3	O Assar (EGY); L 2–4	Did not advance						
Adriana Diaz	Women's singles	Bye	Oshonaike (NGR); W 4–2	Li X (FRA); L 0–4	Did not advance					

== Taekwondo ==
Puerto Rico entered one athlete into the taekwondo competition at the Olympics for the first time since 2008. Crystal Weekes secured a spot in the women's heavyweight category (+67 kg) by virtue of her top two finish at the 2016 Pan American Qualification Tournament in Aguascalientes, Mexico.

Athlete	Event	Round of 16	Quarterfinals	Semifinals	Repechage	Final / BM	
Athlete	Event	Opposition Result	Opposition Result	Opposition Result	Opposition Result	Opposition Result	Rank
Crystal Weekes	Women's +67 kg	Galloway (USA); L 0–5	Did not advance				

== Tennis ==
Puerto Rico has entered one tennis player into the Olympic tournament, signifying the nation's comeback to the sport for the first time since 2004. Monica Puig (world no. 43) qualified directly for the women's singles as one of the top 56 eligible players in the WTA World Rankings as of June 6, 2016.

Athlete	Event	Round of 64	Round of 32	Round of 16	Quarterfinals	Semifinals	Final / BM	
Athlete	Event	Opposition Score	Opposition Score	Opposition Score	Opposition Score	Opposition Score	Opposition Score	Rank
Monica Puig	Women's singles	Hercog (SLO); W 6–3, 6–2	Pavlyuchenkova (RUS); W 6–3, 6–2	Muguruza (ESP); W 6–1, 6–1	Siegemund (GER); W 6–1, 6–1	Kvitová (CZE); W 6–4, 1–6, 6–3	Kerber (GER); W 6–4, 4–6, 6–1	1st place, gold medalist(s)

== Triathlon ==
Puerto Rico has received a spare berth freed up by one of the Germans to send London 2012 Olympian Manuel Huerta to the men's Olympic triathlon as the next highest-ranked individual, not yet qualified, in the ITU Olympic Qualification List as of May 15, 2016, signifying the nation's debut in the sport.

Athlete	Event	Swim (1.5 km)	Trans 1	Bike (40 km)	Trans 2	Run (10 km)	Total Time	Rank
Manuel Huerta	Men's	18:19	0:48	58:01	0:32	33:28	1:53:22	43

== Volleyball ==
=== Indoor ===
==== Women's tournament ====
Puerto Rico women's volleyball team qualified for the Olympics by scoring a first-place triumph and securing a lone outright berth at the final meet of the World Olympic Qualifying Tournament in San Juan.

Team roster

The following is the Puerto Rican roster in the women's volleyball tournament of the 2016 Summer Olympics.

Head coach: Juan Carlos Núñez

No.	Name	Date of birth	Height	Weight	Spike	Block	2015–16 club
1	Debora Seilhamer (L)	4 October 1985	1.66 m (5 ft 5 in)	61 kg (134 lb)	245 cm (96 in)	240 cm (94 in)	(Puerto Rico) Lancheras de Cataño
2	Shara Venegas (L)	18 September 1992	1.73 m (5 ft 8 in)	68 kg (150 lb)	280 cm (110 in)	272 cm (107 in)	(Puerto Rico) Criollas de Caguas
3	Vilmarie Mojica	13 August 1985	1.80 m (5 ft 11 in)	63 kg (139 lb)	295 cm (116 in)	288 cm (113 in)	(Puerto Rico) Valencianas de Juncos
6	Yarimar Rosa (c)	20 June 1988	1.78 m (5 ft 10 in)	62 kg (137 lb)	295 cm (116 in)	285 cm (112 in)	(Turkey) Beşiktaş
7	Stephanie Enright	15 December 1990	1.79 m (5 ft 10 in)	56 kg (123 lb)	300 cm (120 in)	292 cm (115 in)	(Puerto Rico) Criollas de Caguas
9	Áurea Cruz	10 January 1982	1.80 m (5 ft 11 in)	63 kg (139 lb)	310 cm (120 in)	290 cm (110 in)	(Italy) AGIL Novara
10	Diana Reyes	24 April 1993	1.91 m (6 ft 3 in)	76 kg (168 lb)	303 cm (119 in)	299 cm (118 in)	(Puerto Rico) Criollas de Caguas
11	Karina Ocasio	1 August 1985	1.92 m (6 ft 4 in)	76 kg (168 lb)	298 cm (117 in)	288 cm (113 in)	(Puerto Rico) Criollas de Caguas
14	Natalia Valentín	12 September 1989	1.70 m (5 ft 7 in)	61 kg (134 lb)	244 cm (96 in)	240 cm (94 in)	(Puerto Rico) Leonas de Ponce
15	Daly Santana	19 February 1995	1.78 m (5 ft 10 in)	63 kg (139 lb)	243 cm (96 in)	219 cm (86 in)	(Puerto Rico) Capitalinas de San Juan
16	Alexandra Oquendo	3 February 1984	1.89 m (6 ft 2 in)	75 kg (165 lb)	297 cm (117 in)	284 cm (112 in)	(Puerto Rico) Lancheras de Cataño
18	Lynda Morales	20 May 1988	1.88 m (6 ft 2 in)	74 kg (163 lb)	250 cm (98 in)	248 cm (98 in)	(Puerto Rico) Criollas de Caguas

Group play

Pos	Team	Pld	W	L	Pts	SW	SL	SR	SPW	SPL	SPR	Qualification
1	United States	5	5	0	14	15	5	3.000	470	400	1.175	Quarter-finals
2	Netherlands	5	4	1	11	14	7	2.000	455	425	1.071	Quarter-finals
3	Serbia	5	3	2	10	12	6	2.000	410	394	1.041	Quarter-finals
4	China	5	2	3	7	9	9	1.000	398	389	1.023	Quarter-finals
5	Italy	5	1	4	3	4	12	0.333	351	374	0.939	
6	Puerto Rico	5	0	5	0	0	15	0.000	277	379	0.731	

Source: FIVB
Rules for classification: Tiebreakers

6 August 2016; 17:05	United States	3–0	Puerto Rico	Ginásio do Maracanãzinho, Rio de Janeiro; Attendance: 6,832; Referees: Taoufik Boudaya (TUN), Kang Joo-hee (KOR)
6 August 2016; 17:05	(25–17, 25–22, 25–17); Result Statistics			Ginásio do Maracanãzinho, Rio de Janeiro; Attendance: 6,832; Referees: Taoufik Boudaya (TUN), Kang Joo-hee (KOR)

8 August 2016; 17:05	Serbia	3–0	Puerto Rico	Ginásio do Maracanãzinho, Rio de Janeiro; Attendance: 5,730; Referees: Kang Joo-hee (KOR), Andrey Zenovich (RUS)
8 August 2016; 17:05	(29–27, 25–18, 25–20); Result Statistics			Ginásio do Maracanãzinho, Rio de Janeiro; Attendance: 5,730; Referees: Kang Joo-hee (KOR), Andrey Zenovich (RUS)

10 August 2016; 09:30	China	3–0	Puerto Rico	Ginásio do Maracanãzinho, Rio de Janeiro; Attendance: 4,386; Referees: Heike Kraft (GER), Kang Joo-hee (KOR)
10 August 2016; 09:30	(25–20, 25–17, 25–18); Result Statistics			Ginásio do Maracanãzinho, Rio de Janeiro; Attendance: 4,386; Referees: Heike Kraft (GER), Kang Joo-hee (KOR)

12 August 2016; 17:05	Netherlands	3–0	Puerto Rico	Ginásio do Maracanãzinho, Rio de Janeiro; Attendance: 6,742; Referees: Ibrahim Al-Naama (QAT), Hernán Casamiquela (ARG)
12 August 2016; 17:05	(25–14, 25–22, 25–16); Result Statistics			Ginásio do Maracanãzinho, Rio de Janeiro; Attendance: 6,742; Referees: Ibrahim Al-Naama (QAT), Hernán Casamiquela (ARG)

14 August 2016; 15:00	Italy	3–0	Puerto Rico	Ginásio do Maracanãzinho, Rio de Janeiro; Attendance: 7,225; Referees: Kang Joo-hee (KOR), Patricia Rolf (USA)
14 August 2016; 15:00	(25–14, 25–13, 25–22); Result Statistics			Ginásio do Maracanãzinho, Rio de Janeiro; Attendance: 7,225; Referees: Kang Joo-hee (KOR), Patricia Rolf (USA)

== Weightlifting ==
Puerto Rico has qualified one female weightlifter for the Rio Olympics by virtue of a top four national finish at the 2016 Pan American Championships. The team must allocate this place by June 20, 2016.

Athlete	Event	Snatch		Clean & Jerk		Total	Rank
Athlete	Event	Result	Rank	Result	Rank	Total	Rank
Lely Burgos	Women's −53 kg	72	9	90	8	162	9

== Wrestling ==
Puerto Rico has qualified two wrestlers for each of the following weight classes into the Olympic competition, as a result of their semifinal triumphs at the 2016 Pan American Qualification Tournament.

Key:

- VT – Victory by Fall.
- PP – Decision by Points – the loser with technical points.
- PO – Decision by Points – the loser without technical points.
- ST – Technical superiority – the loser without technical points and a margin of victory of at least 8 (Greco-Roman) or 10 (freestyle) points.

Men's freestyle

Athlete	Event	Qualification	Round of 16	Quarterfinal	Semifinal	Repechage 1	Repechage 2	Final / BM	
Athlete	Event	Opposition Result	Opposition Result	Opposition Result	Opposition Result	Opposition Result	Opposition Result	Opposition Result	Rank
Franklin Gómez	−65 kg	Bye	Novachkov (BUL); W 3–1 ^{PP}	Navruzov (UZB); L 1–3 ^{PP}	Did not advance				9
Jaime Espinal	−86 kg	Bye	Yaşar (TUR); L 1–3 ^{PP}	Did not advance		Bye	Salas (CUB); L 1–3 ^{PP}	Did not advance	11

== See also ==
- Puerto Rico at the 2015 Pan American Games
- Puerto Rico at the 2016 Summer Paralympics
