= Wrestling at the 2015 Pan American Games – Women's freestyle 53 kg =

Women's Freestyle 53 kg at the 2015 Pan American Games
- Venue: Mississauga Sports Centre
- Dates: July 16
- Competitors: 7 from 7 nations

Medalists
| Gold medal | Whitney Conder | United States |
| Silver medal | Alma Valencia | Mexico |
| Bronze medal | Yamilka Del Valle | Cuba |
| Bronze medal | Betzabeth Argüello | Venezuela |

The women's freestyle 53 kg competition of the Wrestling events at the 2015 Pan American Games in Toronto were held on July 16 at the Mississauga Sports Centre.

== Schedule ==
All times are Eastern Daylight Time (UTC-4).

| Date | Time | Round |
|---|---|---|
| July 16, 2015 | 14:35 | Quarterfinals |
| July 16, 2015 | 16:41 | Semifinals |
| July 16, 2015 | 21:53 | Bronze medal matches |
| July 16, 2015 | 22:02 | Final |

== Results ==
Legend

- F — Won by fall
- WO - Won by Walkover

=== Final ===
| Quarterfinals | | Semifinals | | Finals |
| Whitney Conder (USA) | WO |
| Elverine Jiménez (NCA) | | Whitney Conder (USA) | 6^{F} |
| Brianne Barry (CAN) | 1 | Yamilka Del Valle (CUB) | 2 |
| Yamilka Del Valle (CUB) | 10 | | | Whitney Conder (USA) | 3 |
| Luisa Valverde (ECU) | 5 | | | Alma Valencia (MEX) | 2 |
| Giullia Rodrigues (BRA) | 4 | Luisa Valverde (ECU) | 0 |
| Betzabeth Argüello (VEN) | 1 | Alma Valencia (MEX) | 11 |
| Alma Valencia (MEX) | 12 |

=== Repechage ===
Bronze medal match
Elverine Jiménez (NCA)
Yamilka Del Valle (CUB) | WO
Betzabeth Argüello (VEN) | 8^{F}
Luisa Valverde (ECU) | 0

== Notes ==
Conder's competitor Elverine Jiménez from Nicaragua was disqualified from the games for doping. As a result, Conder received a Bye at the first round.
