= Reinier Rojas =

Cuban volleyball player (born 1986)

Personal information
- Nationality: Cuban
- Born: July 31, 1986 (age 39)

Sport
- Sport: Volleyball

Achievements and titles
- Olympic finals: 2016 Summer Olympics

Reinier Rojas (born July 31, 1986) is a Cuban volleyball player. He competed for the Cuba men's national volleyball team at the 2016 Summer Olympics.
