= Jillian Gallays =

Canadian freestyle wrestler

Personal information
- Full name: Jillian Alice Gallays
- Born: October 20, 1986 (age 39) St. Brieux, Saskatchewan, Canada
- Height: 165 cm (5 ft 5 in)
- Weight: 53 kg (117 lb)

Sport
- Country: Canada
- Sport: Wrestling
- Coached by: Shane Bradley
Medal record
Women's freestyle wrestling
Representing Canada
World Championships
Bronze medal – third place	2014 Tashkent	53 kg

Jillian Alice Gallays (born October 20, 1986) is a Canadian retired freestyle wrestler. She won the bronze medal at the 53kg event at the 2014 World Wrestling Championships, and is a 2016 Olympian.

== Early life and education ==
Gallays was born in St. Brieux, Saskatchewan. She was diagnosed as having dyslexia at a young age. She was raised by a single mother. She attended the University of Saskatchewan where she obtained a degree in Kinesiology and competed on the Saskatchewan Huskies wrestling team, on which she was the captain. She was a two-time CIS National Champion at U of S.

== Career ==
She is a six-time Canadian National Champion. In 2014, competed at the 2014 World Wrestling Championships in the 53-Kilogram division, winning her first round match against Nadzeya Shushko of Belarus by technical fall, her round of 16 match against Lee Shin-hye of South Korea by fall, and her quarterfinal match against Yuliya Blahinya of Ukraine before losing her semifinal match to eventual winner, Saori Yoshida of Japan. Qualifying for the repechage, she won her bronze medal match by defeating Natalia Malysheva of Russia.

In July 2016, she was officially named to Canada's 2016 Olympic team. She lost her first round match to Jong Myong-suk of North Korea. She placed 19th in the women's featherweight freestyle event at the 2016 Summer Olympics. She retired from wrestling after the 2016 Olympics.

== Post-career ==
After retiring from wrestling, Gallays began working as a strength and conditioning coach at Craven SPORT Services. In 2024, she left Craven and opened her own strength and conditioning centre and began a part-time job selling running shoes for the company Brainsport. Also in 2024, she enrolled in a Master of Management Analytics program at the Smith School of Business.

== Personal life ==
Gallays currently resides in St. Catharines, Ontario, having moved there from Saskatoon in 2014. Her nickname is "Jilla Killa".
