= Miguel Martínez (wrestler) =

Cuban Greco-Roman wrestler

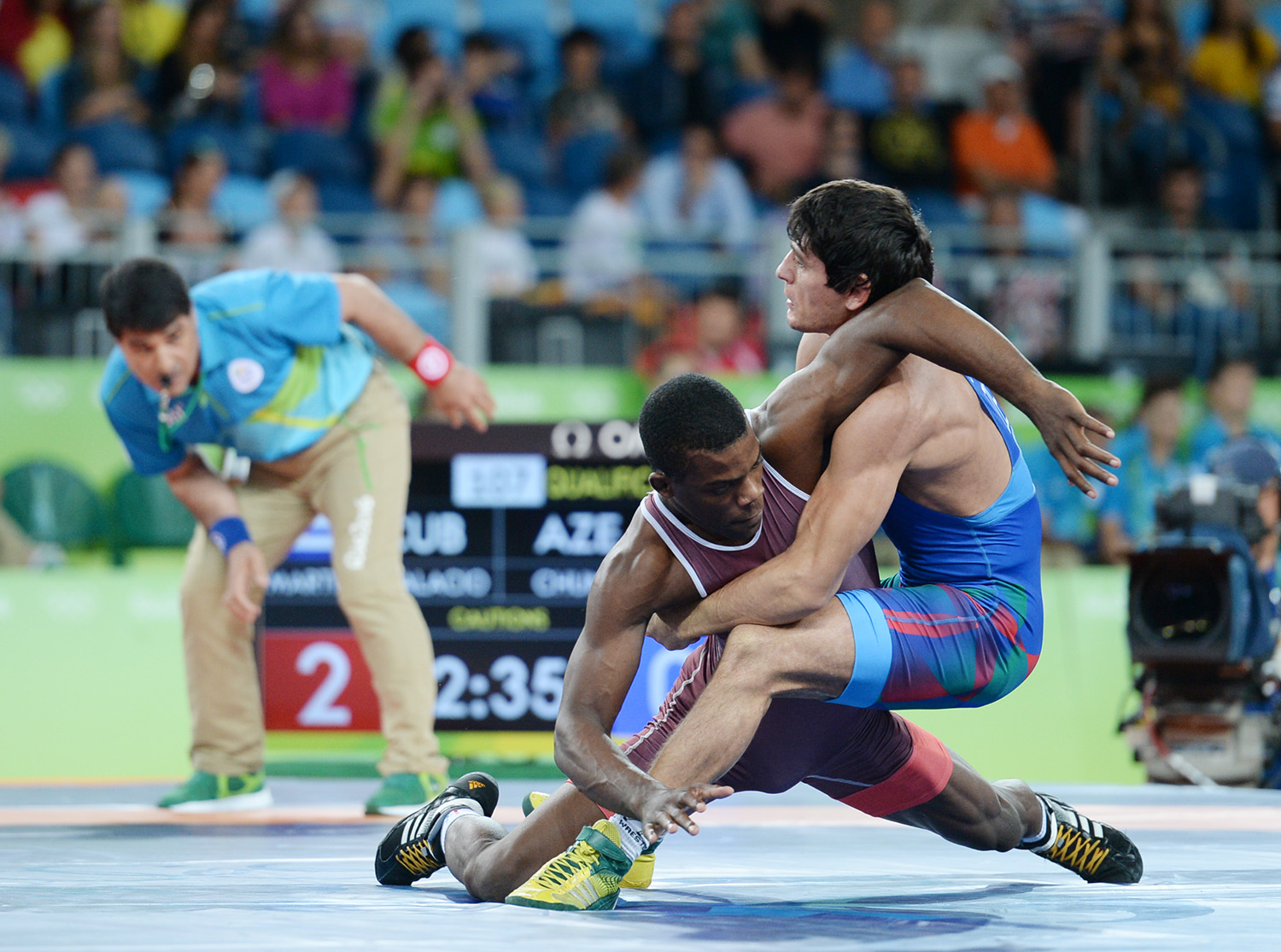
- Martínez (down) against Chunayev during the 2016 Olympics

Personal information
- Born: 23 March 1991 (age 35) Santiago de Cuba, Cuba

Sport
- Sport: Greco-Roman wrestling
Medal record
Representing Cuba
Pan American Games
Bronze medal – third place	2015 Toronto	-66kg

Miguel Martínez Palacios (born March 23, 1991) is a Cuban Greco-Roman wrestler. He competed in the men's Greco-Roman 66 kg event at the 2016 Summer Olympics, in which he was eliminated in the round of 32 by Rasul Chunayev.
