= Yurisandy Hernández =

Cuban Greco-Roman wrestler

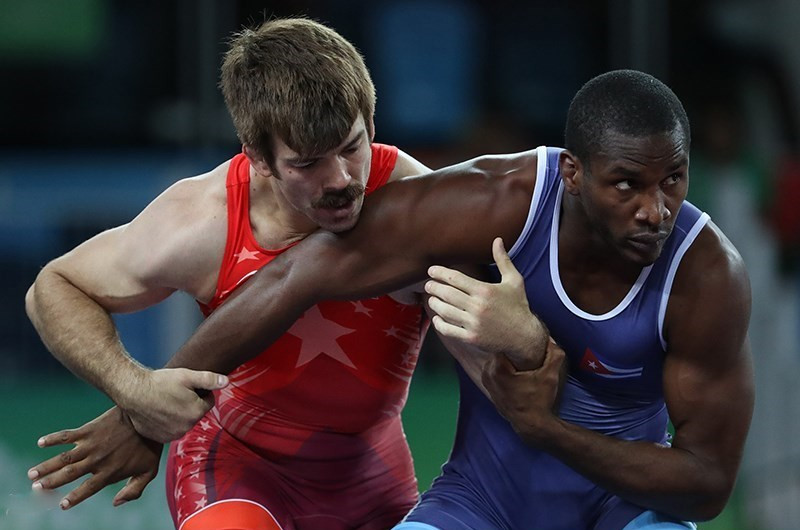
Hernández (right) against Bisek during the 2016 Olympics

Yurisandy Hernández (born February 15, 1990) is a Cuban Greco-Roman wrestler. He competed in the men's Greco-Roman 75 kg event at the 2016 Summer Olympics, in which he was eliminated in the round of 16 by Andy Bisek.
