= Jong Myong-suk =

North Korean wrestler (born 1993)

Personal information
- Born: February 6, 1993 (age 33)

Sport
- Country: North Korea
- Sport: Freestyle wrestling
Medal record
Women's freestyle wrestling
Representing North Korea
World Championships
Bronze medal – third place	2014 Tashkent	53 kg
Bronze medal – third place	2015 Las Vegas	53 kg
Bronze medal – third place	2018 Budapest	55 kg
Military World Games
Bronze medal – third place	2019 Wuhan	57 kg

- Jong Myong-suk
- Hangul: 정명숙
- RR: Jeong Myeongsuk
- MR: Chŏng Myŏngsuk

Jong Myong-suk (Korean: 정명숙; pronounced [tsʌŋ.mjʌŋ.suk̚]; born 1993) is a North Korean wrestler. She won the bronze medal the 2014 World Wrestling Championships, 2015 World Wrestling Championships and 2018 World Wrestling Championships.
