= Whitney Conder =

American freestyle wrestler

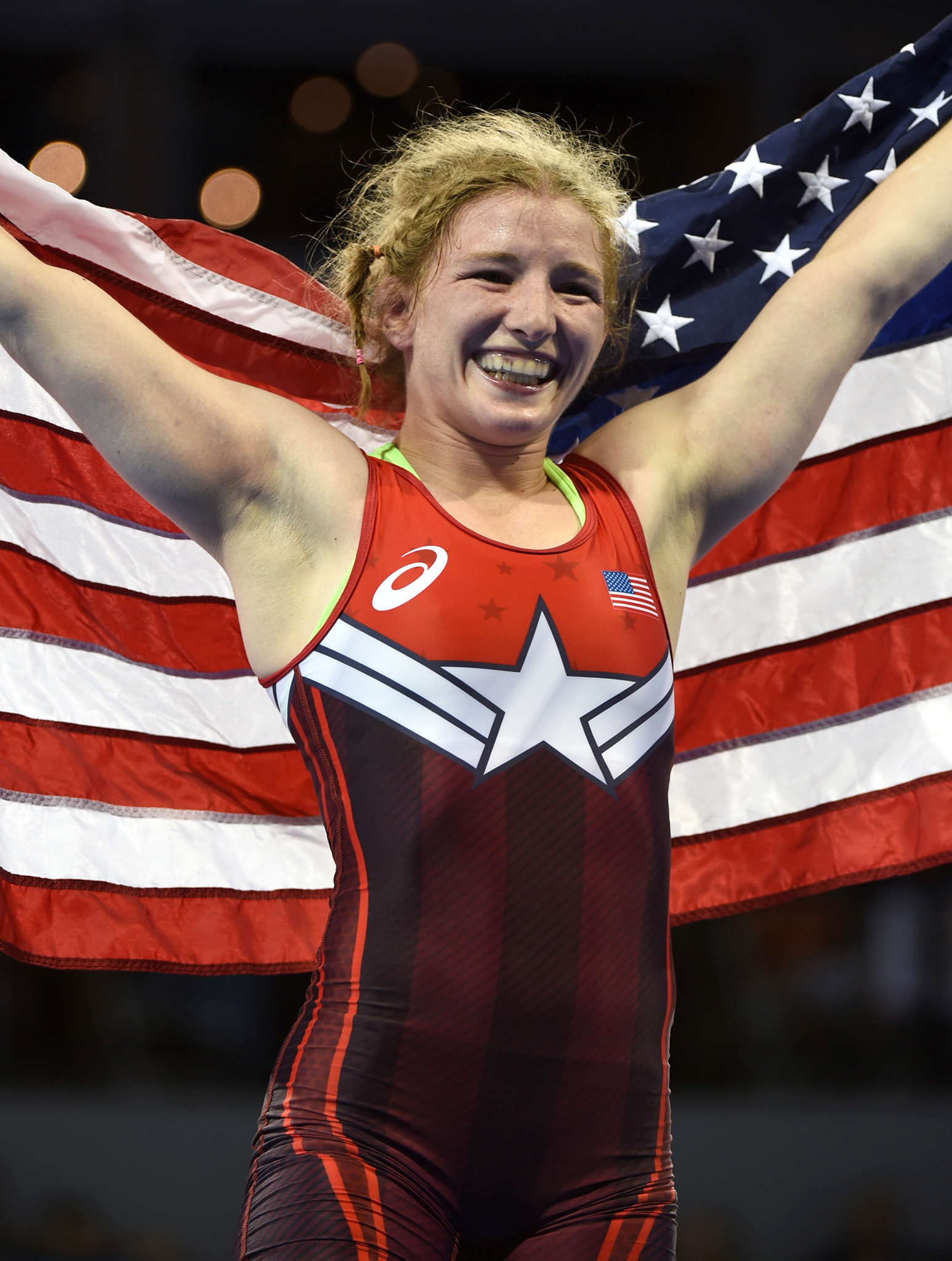
- Conder at the 2015 Pan American Games

Personal information
- Born: May 6, 1988 (age 38) Puyallup, Washington, U.S.
- Height: 5 ft 3 in (160 cm)
- Weight: 110 lb (50 kg)

Sport
- Country: United States
- Sport: Wrestling
- Event: Freestyle
- Club: U.S. Army WCAP
- Team: USA
- Coached by: Shon Lewis
Medal record
Women's freestyle wrestling
Representing the United States
Pan American Games
Gold medal – first place	2015 Toronto	53 kg
Gold medal – first place	2019 Lima	50 kg
Military World Games
Silver medal – second place	2019 Wuhan	50 kg

Whitney Conder (born May 6, 1988) is an American freestyle wrestler. In September 2012, she joined the U.S. Army as part of the World Class Athlete Program and serves with the military police. As a WCAP athlete, Conder has been a World Team member five times, a six-time national champion, and won a Military World silver medal. Military World Championships Silver Medal 2014. Junior World Champion 2007. She won the gold medal in the 53 kg weight division at the 2015 Pan American Games.

Conder was born to Sharon and Monte Conder. She has two brothers, Nate and Dustin Condor, and two sisters, Shantel Bird and Kim Jackson.Married to J’den Cox. Now goes by Whitney Cox. J’den and Whitney have twin daughters.
