= List of World Championships medalists in wrestling (women) =

This is a List of World Championships medalists in women's freestyle wrestling.

== Light flyweight ==
- 44 kg: 1987–1996

Games	Gold	Silver	Bronze
1987 Lørenskog	Brigitte Weigert (BEL)	Anne Johnsen (NOR)	Shoko Yoshimura (JPN)
1989 Martigny	Shoko Yoshimura (JPN)	Huang Yu-hsin (TPE)	Trine Strand (NOR)
1990 Luleå	Shoko Yoshimura (JPN)	Marie Ziegler (USA)	Chen Huei-hsiang (TPE)
1991 Tokyo	Zhong Xiue (CHN)	Marie Ziegler (USA)	Shoko Yoshimura (JPN)
1992 Villeurbanne	Pan Yanping (CHN)	Shoko Yoshimura (JPN)	Tatiana Karamchakova (RUS)
1993 Stavern	Shoko Yoshimura (JPN)	Trine Strand (NOR)	Tatiana Karamchakova (RUS)
1994 Sofia	Shoko Yoshimura (JPN)	Tatiana Karamchakova (RUS)	Dana Durecová (CZE)
1995 Moscow	Shoko Yoshimura (JPN)	Mette Barlie (NOR)	Vickie Zummo (USA)
1996 Sofia	Zhong Xiue (CHN)	Almuth Leitgeb (AUT)	Shoko Yoshimura (JPN)

== Flyweight ==
- 47 kg: 1987–1996
- 46 kg: 1997–2001
- 48 kg: 2002–2017
- 50 kg: 2018–

Games	Gold	Silver	Bronze
1987 Lørenskog	Anne Holten (NOR)	Lynie van der Holst (NED)	Satomi Sugawara (JPN)
1989 Martigny	Chen Ming-hsiu (TPE)	Tomoko Natsumeda (JPN)	Afsoon Roshanzamir (USA)
1990 Luleå	Åsa Pedersen (SWE)	Afsoon Roshanzamir (USA)	Huang Yu-hsin (TPE)
1991 Tokyo	Miyu Yamamoto (JPN)	Pan Yanping (CHN)	Elisabeth Garcia (NOR)
1992 Villeurbanne	Zhong Xiue (CHN)	Tetey Alibekova (RUS)	Miho Kamibayashi (JPN)
1993 Stavern	Zhong Xiue (CHN)	Tricia Saunders (USA)	Tetey Alibekova (RUS)
1994 Sofia	Miho Kamibayashi (JPN)	Margaret LeGates (USA)	Hélène Escaich (FRA)
1995 Moscow	Miyu Yamamoto (JPN)	Zhong Xiue (CHN)	Elena Egoshina (RUS)
1996 Sofia	Tricia Saunders (USA)	Angélique Hidalgo (FRA)	Miho Adachi (JPN)
1997 Clermont-Ferrand	Zhong Xiue (CHN)	Mette Barlie (NOR)	Farah Touchi (FRA)
1998 Poznań	Tricia Saunders (USA)	Miyu Yamamoto (JPN)	Inga Karamchakova (RUS)
1999 Boden	Tricia Saunders (USA)	Zhong Xiue (CHN)	Inga Karamchakova (RUS)
2000 Sofia	Iryna Melnik (UKR)	Inga Karamchakova (RUS)	Carol Huynh (CAN)
2001 Sofia	Iryna Melnik (UKR)	Carol Huynh (CAN)	Brigitte Wagner (GER)
2002 Chalcis	Brigitte Wagner (GER)	Inga Karamchakova (RUS)	Ida Hellström (SWE)
2003 New York City	Iryna Merleni (UKR)	Patricia Miranda (USA)	Li Hui (CHN)
2005 Budapest	Ren Xuecheng (CHN)	Iryna Merleni (UKR)	Carol Huynh (CAN)
2005 Budapest	Ren Xuecheng (CHN)	Iryna Merleni (UKR)	Makiko Sakamoto (JPN)
2006 Guangzhou	Chiharu Icho (JPN)	Ren Xuecheng (CHN)	Francine De Paola (ITA)
2006 Guangzhou	Chiharu Icho (JPN)	Ren Xuecheng (CHN)	Iwona Sadowska (POL)
2007 Baku	Chiharu Icho (JPN)	Iryna Merleni (UKR)	Li Xiaomei (CHN)
2007 Baku	Chiharu Icho (JPN)	Iryna Merleni (UKR)	Mayelis Caripá (VEN)
2008 Tokyo	Clarissa Chun (USA)	Zhuldyz Eshimova (KAZ)	Su Guibei (CHN)
2008 Tokyo	Clarissa Chun (USA)	Zhuldyz Eshimova (KAZ)	Makiko Sakamoto (JPN)
2009 Herning	Mariya Stadnik (AZE)	Lorisa Oorzhak (RUS)	So Sim-hyang (PRK)
2009 Herning	Mariya Stadnik (AZE)	Lorisa Oorzhak (RUS)	Lyudmyla Balushka (UKR)
2010 Moscow	Hitomi Sakamoto (JPN)	Lorisa Oorzhak (RUS)	Carol Huynh (CAN)
2010 Moscow	Hitomi Sakamoto (JPN)	Lorisa Oorzhak (RUS)	Zhao Shasha (CHN)
2011 Istanbul	Hitomi Obara (JPN)	Mariya Stadnik (AZE)	Zhao Shasha (CHN)
2011 Istanbul	Hitomi Obara (JPN)	Mariya Stadnik (AZE)	Zhuldyz Eshimova (KAZ)
2012 Strathcona County	Vanesa Kaladzinskaya (BLR)	Eri Tosaka (JPN)	Li Xiaomei (CHN)
2012 Strathcona County	Vanesa Kaladzinskaya (BLR)	Eri Tosaka (JPN)	Jaqueline Schellin (GER)
2013 Budapest	Eri Tosaka (JPN)	Mayelis Caripá (VEN)	Xu Cheng (CHN)
2013 Budapest	Eri Tosaka (JPN)	Mayelis Caripá (VEN)	Alyssa Lampe (USA)
2014 Tashkent	Eri Tosaka (JPN)	Iwona Matkowska (POL)	Mariya Stadnik (AZE)
2014 Tashkent	Eri Tosaka (JPN)	Iwona Matkowska (POL)	Kim Hyon-gyong (PRK)
2015 Las Vegas	Eri Tosaka (JPN)	Mariya Stadnik (AZE)	Geneviève Morrison (CAN)
2015 Las Vegas	Eri Tosaka (JPN)	Mariya Stadnik (AZE)	Jessica Blaszka (NED)
2017 Paris	Yui Susaki (JPN)	Alina Vuc (ROU)	Kim Son-hyang (PRK)
2017 Paris	Yui Susaki (JPN)	Alina Vuc (ROU)	Evin Demirhan (TUR)
2018 Budapest	Yui Susaki (JPN)	Mariya Stadnik (AZE)	Sun Yanan (CHN)
2018 Budapest	Yui Susaki (JPN)	Mariya Stadnik (AZE)	Oksana Livach (UKR)
2019 Nur-Sultan	Mariya Stadnik (AZE)	Alina Vuc (ROU)	Valentina Islamova (KAZ)
2019 Nur-Sultan	Mariya Stadnik (AZE)	Alina Vuc (ROU)	Ekaterina Poleshchuk (RUS)
2021 Oslo	Remina Yoshimoto (JPN)	Sarah Hildebrandt (USA)	Dolgorjavyn Otgonjargal (MGL)
2021 Oslo	Remina Yoshimoto (JPN)	Sarah Hildebrandt (USA)	Nadezhda Sokolova (RWF)
2022 Belgrade	Yui Susaki (JPN)	Dolgorjavyn Otgonjargal (MGL)	Anna Łukasiak (POL)
2022 Belgrade	Yui Susaki (JPN)	Dolgorjavyn Otgonjargal (MGL)	Sarah Hildebrandt (USA)
2023 Belgrade	Yui Susaki (JPN)	Dolgorjavyn Otgonjargal (MGL)	Feng Ziqi (CHN)
2023 Belgrade	Yui Susaki (JPN)	Dolgorjavyn Otgonjargal (MGL)	Sarah Hildebrandt (USA)
2025 Zagreb	Won Myong-gyong (PRK)	Zhang Yu (CHN)	Evin Demirhan Yavuz (TUR)
2025 Zagreb	Won Myong-gyong (PRK)	Zhang Yu (CHN)	Elizaveta Smirnova (UWW)
2026 Astana	Yui Susaki (JPN)	Neelam Sirohi (IND)	Feng Ziqi (CHN)
2026 Astana	Yui Susaki (JPN)	Neelam Sirohi (IND)	Zeinep Bayanova (KAZ)

== Bantamweight ==
- 50 kg: 1987–1996
- 51 kg: 1997–2013
- 53 kg: 2014–

Games	Gold	Silver	Bronze
1987 Lørenskog	Anne Marie Halvorsen (NOR)	Kyoko Fukuda (JPN)	Martine Poupon (FRA)
1989 Martigny	Anne Holten (NOR)	Asia DeWeese (USA)	Martine Poupon (FRA)
1990 Luleå	Martine Poupon (FRA)	Helena Honkamaa (SWE)	Trine Bentzen (NOR)
1991 Tokyo	Martine Poupon (FRA)	Shannon Williams (USA)	Yoko Higashi (JPN)
1992 Villeurbanne	Tricia Saunders (USA)	Yoshiko Endo (JPN)	Martine Poupon (FRA)
1993 Stavern	Anna Gomis (FRA)	Shannon Williams (USA)	Yoshiko Endo (JPN)
1994 Sofia	Miyu Yamamoto (JPN)	Anna Gomis (FRA)	Elena Egoshina (RUS)
1995 Moscow	Saniyat Ganachueva (RUS)	Gyula Pérez (VEN)	Yoshiko Endo (JPN)
1996 Sofia	Olga Smirnova (RUS)	Yoshiko Endo (JPN)	Ida Hellström (SWE)
1997 Clermont-Ferrand	Joanna Piasecka (POL)	Shannon Williams (USA)	Miho Adachi (JPN)
1998 Poznań	Atsuko Shinomura (JPN)	Ida Hellström (SWE)	Elena Egoshina (RUS)
1999 Boden	Seiko Yamamoto (JPN)	Erica Sharp (CAN)	Gao Yanzhi (CHN)
2000 Sofia	Hitomi Sakamoto (JPN)	Patricia Miranda (USA)	Ida Hellström (SWE)
2001 Sofia	Hitomi Sakamoto (JPN)	Stephanie Murata (USA)	Gao Yanzhi (CHN)
2002 Chalcis	Sofia Poumpouridou (GRE)	Chiharu Icho (JPN)	Natalia Golts (RUS)
2003 New York City	Chiharu Icho (JPN)	Natalia Karamchakova (RUS)	Jenny Wong (USA)
2005 Budapest	Hitomi Sakamoto (JPN)	Vanessa Boubryemm (FRA)	Wen Juling (CHN)
2005 Budapest	Hitomi Sakamoto (JPN)	Vanessa Boubryemm (FRA)	Tsogtbazaryn Enkhjargal (MGL)
2006 Guangzhou	Hitomi Sakamoto (JPN)	Lyndsay Belisle (CAN)	Alena Adashinskaya (RUS)
2006 Guangzhou	Hitomi Sakamoto (JPN)	Lyndsay Belisle (CAN)	Patricia Miranda (USA)
2007 Baku	Hitomi Sakamoto (JPN)	Ren Xuecheng (CHN)	Erica Sharp (CAN)
2007 Baku	Hitomi Sakamoto (JPN)	Ren Xuecheng (CHN)	Anne-Catherine Deluntsch (FRA)
2008 Tokyo	Hitomi Sakamoto (JPN)	Maryna Markevich (BLR)	Vanessa Boubryemm (FRA)
2008 Tokyo	Hitomi Sakamoto (JPN)	Maryna Markevich (BLR)	Yuliya Blahinya (UKR)
2009 Herning	Sofia Mattsson (SWE)	Han Kum-ok (PRK)	Yuri Kai (JPN)
2009 Herning	Sofia Mattsson (SWE)	Han Kum-ok (PRK)	Oleksandra Kohut (UKR)
2010 Moscow	Oleksandra Kohut (UKR)	Yu Horiuchi (JPN)	Zamira Rakhmanova (RUS)
2010 Moscow	Oleksandra Kohut (UKR)	Yu Horiuchi (JPN)	Sofia Mattsson (SWE)
2011 Istanbul	Zamira Rakhmanova (RUS)	Davaasükhiin Otgontsetseg (MGL)	Patimat Bagomedova (AZE)
2011 Istanbul	Zamira Rakhmanova (RUS)	Davaasükhiin Otgontsetseg (MGL)	Jessica MacDonald (CAN)
2012 Strathcona County	Jessica MacDonald (CAN)	Sun Yanan (CHN)	Babita Kumari (IND)
2012 Strathcona County	Jessica MacDonald (CAN)	Sun Yanan (CHN)	Alyssa Lampe (USA)
2013 Budapest	Sun Yanan (CHN)	Erdenechimegiin Sumiyaa (MGL)	Jessica MacDonald (CAN)
2013 Budapest	Sun Yanan (CHN)	Erdenechimegiin Sumiyaa (MGL)	So Sim-hyang (PRK)
2014 Tashkent	Saori Yoshida (JPN)	Sofia Mattsson (SWE)	Jillian Gallays (CAN)
2014 Tashkent	Saori Yoshida (JPN)	Sofia Mattsson (SWE)	Jong Myong-suk (PRK)
2015 Las Vegas	Saori Yoshida (JPN)	Sofia Mattsson (SWE)	Odunayo Adekuoroye (NGR)
2015 Las Vegas	Saori Yoshida (JPN)	Sofia Mattsson (SWE)	Jong Myong-suk (PRK)
2017 Paris	Vanesa Kaladzinskaya (BLR)	Mayu Mukaida (JPN)	Maria Prevolaraki (GRE)
2017 Paris	Vanesa Kaladzinskaya (BLR)	Mayu Mukaida (JPN)	Roksana Zasina (POL)
2018 Budapest	Haruna Okuno (JPN)	Sarah Hildebrandt (USA)	Diana Weicker (CAN)
2018 Budapest	Haruna Okuno (JPN)	Sarah Hildebrandt (USA)	Pang Qianyu (CHN)
2019 Nur-Sultan	Pak Yong-mi (PRK)	Mayu Mukaida (JPN)	Pang Qianyu (CHN)
2019 Nur-Sultan	Pak Yong-mi (PRK)	Mayu Mukaida (JPN)	Vinesh Phogat (IND)
2021 Oslo	Akari Fujinami (JPN)	Iulia Leorda (MDA)	Samantha Stewart (CAN)
2021 Oslo	Akari Fujinami (JPN)	Iulia Leorda (MDA)	Katarzyna Krawczyk (POL)
2022 Belgrade	Dominique Parrish (USA)	Batkhuyagiin Khulan (MGL)	Maria Prevolaraki (GRE)
2022 Belgrade	Dominique Parrish (USA)	Batkhuyagiin Khulan (MGL)	Vinesh Phogat (IND)
2023 Belgrade	Akari Fujinami (JPN)	Vanesa Kaladzinskaya (AIN)	Lucía Yépez (ECU)
2023 Belgrade	Akari Fujinami (JPN)	Vanesa Kaladzinskaya (AIN)	Antim Panghal (UWW)
2025 Zagreb	Haruna Murayama (JPN)	Lucía Yépez (ECU)	Antim Panghal (IND)
2025 Zagreb	Haruna Murayama (JPN)	Lucía Yépez (ECU)	Choe Hyo-gyong (PRK)
2026 Astana	Moe Kiyooka (JPN)	Lucía Yépez (ECU)	Andreea Ana (ROU)
2026 Astana	Moe Kiyooka (JPN)	Lucía Yépez (ECU)	Jonna Malmgren (SWE)

== Featherweight ==
- 53 kg: 1987–1996
- 55 kg: 2014–

Games	Gold	Silver	Bronze
1987 Lørenskog	Sylvie van Gucht (FRA)	Line Johansen (NOR)	Stine Johansen (NOR)
1989 Martigny	Sylvie van Gucht (FRA)	Chou Yu-ping (TPE)	Lotte Søvre (NOR)
1990 Luleå	Sylvie van Gucht (FRA)	Yoshiko Endo (JPN)	Lotte Søvre (NOR)
1991 Tokyo	Zhang Xia (CHN)	Yoshiko Endo (JPN)	Wendy Izaguirre (VEN)
1992 Villeurbanne	Wendy Izaguirre (VEN)	Akemi Kawasaki (JPN)	Liudmila Popova (RUS)
1993 Stavern	Line Johansen (NOR)	Akemi Kawasaki (JPN)	Wendy Izaguirre (VEN)
1994 Sofia	Akemi Kawasaki (JPN)	Shannon Williams (USA)	Sophie Pluquet (FRA)
1995 Moscow	Sophie Pluquet (FRA)	Kozue Kimura (JPN)	Wendy Izaguirre (VEN)
1996 Sofia	Anna Gomis (FRA)	Jennifer Ryz (CAN)	Ryoko Sakae (JPN)
2014 Tashkent	Chiho Hamada (JPN)	Irina Ologonova (RUS)	Iryna Khariv (UKR)
2014 Tashkent	Chiho Hamada (JPN)	Irina Ologonova (RUS)	Helen Maroulis (USA)
2015 Las Vegas	Helen Maroulis (USA)	Irina Ologonova (RUS)	Evelina Nikolova (BUL)
2015 Las Vegas	Helen Maroulis (USA)	Irina Ologonova (RUS)	Tetyana Kit (UKR)
2016 Budapest	Mayu Mukaida (JPN)	Irina Ologonova (RUS)	Aiyim Abdildina (KAZ)
2016 Budapest	Mayu Mukaida (JPN)	Irina Ologonova (RUS)	Davaasükhiin Otgontsetseg (MGL)
2017 Paris	Haruna Okuno (JPN)	Odunayo Adekuoroye (NGR)	Iryna Kurachkina (BLR)
2017 Paris	Haruna Okuno (JPN)	Odunayo Adekuoroye (NGR)	Becka Leathers (USA)
2018 Budapest	Mayu Mukaida (JPN)	Zalina Sidakova (BLR)	Lianna Montero (CUB)
2018 Budapest	Mayu Mukaida (JPN)	Zalina Sidakova (BLR)	Jong Myong-suk (PRK)
2019 Nur-Sultan	Jacarra Winchester (USA)	Nanami Irie (JPN)	Bat-Ochiryn Bolortuyaa (MGL)
2019 Nur-Sultan	Jacarra Winchester (USA)	Nanami Irie (JPN)	Olga Khoroshavtseva (RUS)
2021 Oslo	Tsugumi Sakurai (JPN)	Nina Hemmer (GER)	Oleksandra Khomenets (UKR)
2021 Oslo	Tsugumi Sakurai (JPN)	Nina Hemmer (GER)	Jenna Burkert (USA)
2022 Belgrade	Mayu Shidochi (JPN)	Oleksandra Khomenets (UKR)	Karla Godinez (CAN)
2022 Belgrade	Mayu Shidochi (JPN)	Oleksandra Khomenets (UKR)	Xie Mengyu (CHN)
2023 Belgrade	Haruna Okuno (JPN)	Jacarra Winchester (USA)	Anastasia Blayvas (GER)
2023 Belgrade	Haruna Okuno (JPN)	Jacarra Winchester (USA)	Mariana Drăguțan (MDA)
2024 Tirana	Moe Kiyooka (JPN)	Zhang Jin (CHN)	Iryna Kurachkina (AIN)
2024 Tirana	Moe Kiyooka (JPN)	Zhang Jin (CHN)	Tatiana Debien (FRA)
2025 Zagreb	Oh Kyong-ryong (PRK)	Ekaterina Verbina (UWW)	Sowaka Uchida (JPN)
2025 Zagreb	Oh Kyong-ryong (PRK)	Ekaterina Verbina (UWW)	Andreea Ana (ROU)
2026 Astana	Everest Leydecker (USA)	Nataliia Klivchutska (UKR)	Nagisa Harada (JPN)
2026 Astana	Everest Leydecker (USA)	Nataliia Klivchutska (UKR)	Ekaterina Verbina (RUS)

== Lightweight ==
- 57 kg: 1987–1996
- 56 kg: 1997–2001
- 55 kg: 2002–2013
- 58 kg: 2004–2017
- 57 kg: 2018–

Games	Gold	Silver	Bronze
1987 Lørenskog	Isabelle Dourthe (FRA)	Sylvie Maret (FRA)	Silje Hauland (NOR)
1989 Martigny	Gudrun Høie (NOR)	Ryoko Sakamoto (JPN)	Inge Krasser (SUI)
1990 Luleå	Gudrun Høie (NOR)	Olga Lugo (VEN)	Ryoko Sakamoto (JPN)
1991 Tokyo	Olga Lugo (VEN)	Gudrun Høie (NOR)	Marine Roy (FRA)
1992 Villeurbanne	Ryoko Sakamoto (JPN)	Marine Roy (FRA)	Line Johansen (NOR)
1993 Stavern	Gudrun Høie (NOR)	Olga Lugo (VEN)	Huang Ai-chun (TPE)
1994 Sofia	Line Johansen (NOR)	Zohya Dahmani (FRA)	Sara Eriksson (SWE)
1995 Moscow	Sara Eriksson (SWE)	Lene Aanes (NOR)	Anna Gomis (FRA)
1996 Sofia	Sara Eriksson (SWE)	Jackie Berube (USA)	Lene Aanes (NOR)
1997 Clermont-Ferrand	Anna Gomis (FRA)	Mariko Shimizu (JPN)	Sara Eriksson (SWE)
1998 Poznań	Gudrun Høie (NOR)	Anna Gomis (FRA)	Sara Eriksson (SWE)
1999 Boden	Anna Gomis (FRA)	Mariko Shimizu (JPN)	Gudrun Høie (NOR)
2000 Sofia	Seiko Yamamoto (JPN)	Tetyana Lazareva (UKR)	Jennifer Ryz (CAN)
2001 Sofia	Seiko Yamamoto (JPN)	Lubov Volosova (RUS)	Tetyana Lazareva (UKR)
2002 Chalcis	Saori Yoshida (JPN)	Tina George (USA)	Ida-Theres Karlsson (SWE)
2003 New York City	Saori Yoshida (JPN)	Tina George (USA)	Natalia Golts (RUS)
2005 Budapest	Saori Yoshida (JPN)	Su Lihui (CHN)	Tonya Verbeek (CAN)
2005 Budapest	Saori Yoshida (JPN)	Su Lihui (CHN)	Natalia Golts (RUS)
2006 Guangzhou	Saori Yoshida (JPN)	Mariya Yahorava (BLR)	Minerva Montero (ESP)
2006 Guangzhou	Saori Yoshida (JPN)	Mariya Yahorava (BLR)	Ida-Theres Karlsson (SWE)
2007 Baku	Saori Yoshida (JPN)	Ida-Theres Karlsson (SWE)	Olga Smirnova (KAZ)
2007 Baku	Saori Yoshida (JPN)	Ida-Theres Karlsson (SWE)	Natalia Golts (RUS)
2008 Tokyo	Saori Yoshida (JPN)	Tetyana Lazareva (UKR)	Brittanee Laverdure (CAN)
2008 Tokyo	Saori Yoshida (JPN)	Tetyana Lazareva (UKR)	Tatiana Suarez (USA)
2009 Herning	Saori Yoshida (JPN)	Sona Ahmadli (AZE)	Alena Filipava (BLR)
2009 Herning	Saori Yoshida (JPN)	Sona Ahmadli (AZE)	Tonya Verbeek (CAN)
2010 Moscow	Saori Yoshida (JPN)	Yuliya Ratkevich (AZE)	Anna Gomis (FRA)
2010 Moscow	Saori Yoshida (JPN)	Yuliya Ratkevich (AZE)	Tatiana Suarez (USA)
2011 Istanbul	Saori Yoshida (JPN)	Tonya Verbeek (CAN)	Ida-Theres Nerell (SWE)
2011 Istanbul	Saori Yoshida (JPN)	Tonya Verbeek (CAN)	Tetyana Lazareva (UKR)
2012 Strathcona County	Saori Yoshida (JPN)	Helen Maroulis (USA)	Maria Prevolaraki (GRE)
2012 Strathcona County	Saori Yoshida (JPN)	Helen Maroulis (USA)	Geeta Phogat (IND)
2013 Budapest	Saori Yoshida (JPN)	Sofia Mattsson (SWE)	Emese Barka (HUN)
2013 Budapest	Saori Yoshida (JPN)	Sofia Mattsson (SWE)	Valeria Koblova (RUS)
2014 Tashkent	Kaori Icho (JPN)	Valeria Koblova (RUS)	Anastasiya Huchok (BLR)
2014 Tashkent	Kaori Icho (JPN)	Valeria Koblova (RUS)	Elif Jale Yeşilırmak (TUR)
2015 Las Vegas	Kaori Icho (JPN)	Petra Olli (FIN)	Yuliya Ratkevich (AZE)
2015 Las Vegas	Kaori Icho (JPN)	Petra Olli (FIN)	Elif Jale Yeşilırmak (TUR)
2017 Paris	Helen Maroulis (USA)	Marwa Amri (TUN)	Michelle Fazzari (CAN)
2017 Paris	Helen Maroulis (USA)	Marwa Amri (TUN)	Aisuluu Tynybekova (KGZ)
2018 Budapest	Rong Ningning (CHN)	Bilyana Dudova (BUL)	Emese Barka (HUN)
2018 Budapest	Rong Ningning (CHN)	Bilyana Dudova (BUL)	Pooja Dhanda (IND)
2019 Nur-Sultan	Risako Kawai (JPN)	Rong Ningning (CHN)	Iryna Kurachkina (BLR)
2019 Nur-Sultan	Risako Kawai (JPN)	Rong Ningning (CHN)	Odunayo Adekuoroye (NGR)
2021 Oslo	Helen Maroulis (USA)	Anshu Malik (IND)	Sae Nanjo (JPN)
2021 Oslo	Helen Maroulis (USA)	Anshu Malik (IND)	Erkhembayaryn Davaachimeg (MGL)
2022 Belgrade	Tsugumi Sakurai (JPN)	Helen Maroulis (USA)	Anhelina Lysak (POL)
2022 Belgrade	Tsugumi Sakurai (JPN)	Helen Maroulis (USA)	Alina Hrushyna (UKR)
2023 Belgrade	Tsugumi Sakurai (JPN)	Anastasia Nichita (MDA)	Odunayo Adekuoroye (NGR)
2023 Belgrade	Tsugumi Sakurai (JPN)	Anastasia Nichita (MDA)	Helen Maroulis (USA)
2025 Zagreb	Helen Maroulis (USA)	Son Il-sim (PRK)	Hong Kexin (CHN)
2025 Zagreb	Helen Maroulis (USA)	Son Il-sim (PRK)	Olga Khoroshavtseva (UWW)
2026 Astana	Hong Kexin (CHN)	Sena Nagamoto (JPN)	Iryna Kurachkina (BLR)
2026 Astana	Hong Kexin (CHN)	Sena Nagamoto (JPN)	Helen Maroulis (USA)

== Welterweight ==
- 59 kg: 2002–2013
- 60 kg: 2014–2017
- 59 kg: 2018–

Games	Gold	Silver	Bronze
2002 Chalcis	Alena Kartashova (RUS)	Lotta Andersson (SWE)	Mabel Fonseca (PUR)
2003 New York City	Seiko Yamamoto (JPN)	Natalia Ivashko (RUS)	Sally Roberts (USA)
2005 Budapest	Ayako Shoda (JPN)	Marianna Sastin (HUN)	Lene Aanes (NOR)
2005 Budapest	Ayako Shoda (JPN)	Marianna Sastin (HUN)	Sally Roberts (USA)
2006 Guangzhou	Ayako Shoda (JPN)	Su Lihui (CHN)	Alka Tomar (IND)
2006 Guangzhou	Ayako Shoda (JPN)	Su Lihui (CHN)	Nataliya Synyshyn (UKR)
2007 Baku	Audrey Prieto (FRA)	Stéphanie Groß (GER)	Dorjiin Narmandakh (MGL)
2007 Baku	Audrey Prieto (FRA)	Stéphanie Groß (GER)	Nataliya Synyshyn (UKR)
2008 Tokyo	Ayako Shoda (JPN)	Natalia Golts (RUS)	Elvira Mursalova (AZE)
2008 Tokyo	Ayako Shoda (JPN)	Natalia Golts (RUS)	Agata Pietrzyk (POL)
2009 Herning	Yuliya Ratkevich (AZE)	Agata Pietrzyk (POL)	Marianna Sastin (HUN)
2009 Herning	Yuliya Ratkevich (AZE)	Agata Pietrzyk (POL)	Hanna Vasylenko (UKR)
2010 Moscow	Soronzonboldyn Battsetseg (MGL)	Zhang Lan (CHN)	Ayako Shoda (JPN)
2010 Moscow	Soronzonboldyn Battsetseg (MGL)	Zhang Lan (CHN)	Johanna Mattsson (SWE)
2011 Istanbul	Hanna Vasylenko (UKR)	Sofia Mattsson (SWE)	Sona Ahmadli (AZE)
2011 Istanbul	Hanna Vasylenko (UKR)	Sofia Mattsson (SWE)	Takako Saito (JPN)
2012 Strathcona County	Zhang Lan (CHN)	Zalina Sidakova (BLR)	Olga Butkevych (GBR)
2012 Strathcona County	Zhang Lan (CHN)	Zalina Sidakova (BLR)	Tungalagiin Mönkhtuyaa (MGL)
2013 Budapest	Marianna Sastin (HUN)	Taybe Yusein (BUL)	Yuliya Ratkevich (AZE)
2013 Budapest	Marianna Sastin (HUN)	Taybe Yusein (BUL)	Tungalagiin Mönkhtuyaa (MGL)
2014 Tashkent	Sükheegiin Tserenchimed (MGL)	Yuliya Ratkevich (AZE)	Taybe Yusein (BUL)
2014 Tashkent	Sükheegiin Tserenchimed (MGL)	Yuliya Ratkevich (AZE)	Natalia Golts (RUS)
2015 Las Vegas	Oksana Herhel (UKR)	Sükheegiin Tserenchimed (MGL)	Dzhanan Manolova (BUL)
2015 Las Vegas	Oksana Herhel (UKR)	Sükheegiin Tserenchimed (MGL)	Leigh Jaynes (USA)
2016 Budapest	Pei Xingru (CHN)	Alli Ragan (USA)	Linda Morais (CAN)
2016 Budapest	Pei Xingru (CHN)	Alli Ragan (USA)	Emese Barka (HUN)
2017 Paris	Risako Kawai (JPN)	Alli Ragan (USA)	Anastasija Grigorjeva (LAT)
2017 Paris	Risako Kawai (JPN)	Alli Ragan (USA)	Johanna Mattsson (SWE)
2018 Budapest	Risako Kawai (JPN)	Elif Jale Yeşilırmak (TUR)	Pei Xingru (CHN)
2018 Budapest	Risako Kawai (JPN)	Elif Jale Yeşilırmak (TUR)	Baatarjavyn Shoovdor (MGL)
2019 Nur-Sultan	Linda Morais (CAN)	Lyubov Ovcharova (RUS)	Pei Xingru (CHN)
2019 Nur-Sultan	Linda Morais (CAN)	Lyubov Ovcharova (RUS)	Baatarjavyn Shoovdor (MGL)
2021 Oslo	Bilyana Dudova (BUL)	Akie Hanai (JPN)	Sarita Mor (IND)
2021 Oslo	Bilyana Dudova (BUL)	Akie Hanai (JPN)	Baatarjavyn Shoovdor (MGL)
2022 Belgrade	Anastasia Nichita (MDA)	Grace Bullen (NOR)	Sakura Motoki (JPN)
2022 Belgrade	Anastasia Nichita (MDA)	Grace Bullen (NOR)	Jowita Wrzesień (POL)
2023 Belgrade	Zhang Qi (CHN)	Yuliya Tkach (UKR)	Othelie Høie (NOR)
2023 Belgrade	Zhang Qi (CHN)	Yuliya Tkach (UKR)	Jennifer Rogers (USA)
2024 Tirana	Risako Kinjo (JPN)	Sükheegiin Tserenchimed (MGL)	Elena Brugger (GER)
2024 Tirana	Risako Kinjo (JPN)	Sükheegiin Tserenchimed (MGL)	Mansi Ahlawat (IND)
2025 Zagreb	Sakura Onishi (JPN)	Mariia Vynnyk (UKR)	Laurence Beauregard (CAN)
2025 Zagreb	Sakura Onishi (JPN)	Mariia Vynnyk (UKR)	Togtokhyn Altjin (MGL)
2026 Astana	Manisha Bhanwala (IND)	Abigail Nette (USA)	Khürelkhüügiin Bolortuyaa (MGL)
2026 Astana	Manisha Bhanwala (IND)	Abigail Nette (USA)	Mariia Vynnyk (UKR)

== Middleweight ==
- 61 kg: 1987–1996
- 62 kg: 1997–2001
- 63 kg: 2002–2017
- 62 kg: 2018–

Games	Gold	Silver	Bronze
1987 Lørenskog	Ine Barlie (NOR)	Akiko Iijima (JPN)	Pia Buchholtz (DEN)
1989 Martigny	Jocelyne Sagon (FRA)	Ine Barlie (NOR)	Kimie Hoshikawa (JPN)
1990 Luleå	Brigitte Siffert (FRA)	Kimie Hoshikawa (JPN)	Ine Barlie (NOR)
1991 Tokyo	Brigitte Siffert (FRA)	Kimie Hoshikawa (JPN)	Line Johansen (NOR)
1992 Villeurbanne	Ine Barlie (NOR)	Kimie Hoshikawa (JPN)	Kong Yan (CHN)
1993 Stavern	Nikola Hartmann (AUT)	Isabelle Dourthe (FRA)	Lene Barlie (NOR)
1994 Sofia	Nikola Hartmann (AUT)	Isabelle Dourthe (FRA)	Natalia Ivanova (RUS)
1995 Moscow	Nikola Hartmann (AUT)	Natalia Ivanova (RUS)	Kong Yan (CHN)
1996 Sofia	Mikiko Miyazaki (JPN)	Natalia Ivanova (RUS)	Stéphanie Groß (GER)
1997 Clermont-Ferrand	Lise Golliot (FRA)	Stéphanie Groß (GER)	Małgorzata Bassa (POL)
1998 Poznań	Nikola Hartmann (AUT)	Lene Aanes (NOR)	Natalia Vinogradova (RUS)
1999 Boden	Ayako Shoda (JPN)	Meng Lili (CHN)	Lotta Andersson (SWE)
2000 Sofia	Nikola Hartmann (AUT)	Rena Iwama (JPN)	Stéphanie Groß (GER)
2001 Sofia	Meng Lili (CHN)	Diletta Giampiccolo (ITA)	Lene Aanes (NOR)
2002 Chalcis	Kaori Icho (JPN)	Sara Eriksson (SWE)	Lene Aanes (NOR)
2003 New York City	Kaori Icho (JPN)	Sara McMann (USA)	Viola Yanik (CAN)
2005 Budapest	Kaori Icho (JPN)	Jing Ruixue (CHN)	Volha Khilko (BLR)
2005 Budapest	Kaori Icho (JPN)	Jing Ruixue (CHN)	Sara McMann (USA)
2006 Guangzhou	Kaori Icho (JPN)	Xu Haiyan (CHN)	Monika Rogien (POL)
2006 Guangzhou	Kaori Icho (JPN)	Xu Haiyan (CHN)	Helena Allandi (SWE)
2007 Baku	Kaori Icho (JPN)	Yelena Shalygina (KAZ)	Monika Rogien (POL)
2007 Baku	Kaori Icho (JPN)	Yelena Shalygina (KAZ)	Sara McMann (USA)
2008 Tokyo	Mio Nishimaki (JPN)	Lubov Volosova (RUS)	Meng Lili (CHN)
2008 Tokyo	Mio Nishimaki (JPN)	Lubov Volosova (RUS)	Audrey Prieto (FRA)
2009 Herning	Mio Nishimaki (JPN)	Lubov Volosova (RUS)	Justine Bouchard (CAN)
2009 Herning	Mio Nishimaki (JPN)	Lubov Volosova (RUS)	Yelena Shalygina (KAZ)
2010 Moscow	Kaori Icho (JPN)	Elena Pirozhkova (USA)	Lubov Volosova (RUS)
2010 Moscow	Kaori Icho (JPN)	Elena Pirozhkova (USA)	Henna Johansson (SWE)
2011 Istanbul	Kaori Icho (JPN)	Marianna Sastin (HUN)	Jing Ruixue (CHN)
2011 Istanbul	Kaori Icho (JPN)	Marianna Sastin (HUN)	Ochirbatyn Nasanburmaa (MGL)
2012 Strathcona County	Elena Pirozhkova (USA)	Taybe Yusein (BUL)	Justine Bouchard (CAN)
2012 Strathcona County	Elena Pirozhkova (USA)	Taybe Yusein (BUL)	Xiluo Zhuoma (CHN)
2013 Budapest	Kaori Icho (JPN)	Soronzonboldyn Battsetseg (MGL)	Yekaterina Larionova (KAZ)
2013 Budapest	Kaori Icho (JPN)	Soronzonboldyn Battsetseg (MGL)	Elena Pirozhkova (USA)
2014 Tashkent	Yuliya Tkach (UKR)	Elena Pirozhkova (USA)	Anastasija Grigorjeva (LAT)
2014 Tashkent	Yuliya Tkach (UKR)	Elena Pirozhkova (USA)	Valeria Lazinskaya (RUS)
2015 Las Vegas	Soronzonboldyn Battsetseg (MGL)	Risako Kawai (JPN)	Taybe Yusein (BUL)
2015 Las Vegas	Soronzonboldyn Battsetseg (MGL)	Risako Kawai (JPN)	Yuliya Tkach (UKR)
2017 Paris	Pürevdorjiin Orkhon (MGL)	Yuliya Tkach (UKR)	Jackeline Rentería (COL)
2017 Paris	Pürevdorjiin Orkhon (MGL)	Yuliya Tkach (UKR)	Valeria Lazinskaya (RUS)
2018 Budapest	Taybe Yusein (BUL)	Yukako Kawai (JPN)	Yuliya Tkach (UKR)
2018 Budapest	Taybe Yusein (BUL)	Yukako Kawai (JPN)	Mallory Velte (USA)
2019 Nur-Sultan	Aisuluu Tynybekova (KGZ)	Taybe Yusein (BUL)	Yukako Kawai (JPN)
2019 Nur-Sultan	Aisuluu Tynybekova (KGZ)	Taybe Yusein (BUL)	Henna Johansson (SWE)
2021 Oslo	Aisuluu Tynybekova (KGZ)	Kayla Miracle (USA)	Nonoka Ozaki (JPN)
2021 Oslo	Aisuluu Tynybekova (KGZ)	Kayla Miracle (USA)	Enkhbatyn Gantuyaa (MGL)
2022 Belgrade	Nonoka Ozaki (JPN)	Kayla Miracle (USA)	Luo Xiaojuan (CHN)
2022 Belgrade	Nonoka Ozaki (JPN)	Kayla Miracle (USA)	Ilona Prokopevniuk (UKR)
2023 Belgrade	Aisuluu Tynybekova (KGZ)	Sakura Motoki (JPN)	Grace Bullen (NOR)
2023 Belgrade	Aisuluu Tynybekova (KGZ)	Sakura Motoki (JPN)	Iryna Koliadenko (UKR)
2025 Zagreb	Sakura Motoki (JPN)	Kim Ok-ju (PRK)	Pürevdorjiin Orkhon (MGL)
2025 Zagreb	Sakura Motoki (JPN)	Kim Ok-ju (PRK)	Amina Tandelova (UWW)
2026 Astana	Adaugo Nwachukwu (USA)	Nonoka Ozaki (JPN)	Bilyana Dudova (BUL)
2026 Astana	Adaugo Nwachukwu (USA)	Nonoka Ozaki (JPN)	Amina Tandelova (RUS)

== Super middleweight ==
- 65 kg: 1987–

Games	Gold	Silver	Bronze
1987 Lørenskog	Brigitte Herlin (FRA)	Dorthe Pedersen (DEN)	Kimie Hoshikawa (JPN)
1989 Martigny	Emmanuelle Blind (FRA)	Nina Nilsen (NOR)	Akiko Iijima (JPN)
1990 Luleå	Akiko Iijima (JPN)	Ling Wu-mei (TPE)	Line Johansen (NOR)
1991 Tokyo	Akiko Iijima (JPN)	Ine Barlie (NOR)	Sylvie Thomé (FRA)
1992 Villeurbanne	Wang Chaoli (CHN)	Wu Huei-li (TPE)	Elmira Kurbanova (RUS)
1993 Stavern	Wang Chaoli (CHN)	Elmira Kurbanova (RUS)	Janna Penny (CAN)
1994 Sofia	Yayoi Urano (JPN)	Doris Blind (FRA)	Maria Kremskaya (UKR)
1995 Moscow	Yayoi Urano (JPN)	Doris Blind (FRA)	Natalia Lazarenko (RUS)
1996 Sofia	Yayoi Urano (JPN)	Doris Blind (FRA)	Elmira Kurbanova (RUS)
2018 Budapest	Petra Olli (FIN)	Danielle Lappage (CAN)	Irina Netreba (AZE)
2018 Budapest	Petra Olli (FIN)	Danielle Lappage (CAN)	Ayana Gempei (JPN)
2019 Nur-Sultan	Inna Trazhukova (RUS)	Iryna Koliadenko (UKR)	Elis Manolova (AZE)
2019 Nur-Sultan	Inna Trazhukova (RUS)	Iryna Koliadenko (UKR)	Wang Xiaoqian (CHN)
2021 Oslo	Irina Rîngaci (MDA)	Miwa Morikawa (JPN)	Johanna Mattsson (SWE)
2021 Oslo	Irina Rîngaci (MDA)	Miwa Morikawa (JPN)	Forrest Molinari (USA)
2022 Belgrade	Miwa Morikawa (JPN)	Long Jia (CHN)	Koumba Larroque (FRA)
2022 Belgrade	Miwa Morikawa (JPN)	Long Jia (CHN)	Mallory Velte (USA)
2023 Belgrade	Nonoka Ozaki (JPN)	Macey Kilty (USA)	Mimi Hristova (BUL)
2023 Belgrade	Nonoka Ozaki (JPN)	Macey Kilty (USA)	Lili (CHN)
2024 Tirana	Long Jia (CHN)	Kateryna Zelenykh (ROU)	Miwa Morikawa (JPN)
2024 Tirana	Long Jia (CHN)	Kateryna Zelenykh (ROU)	Macey Kilty (USA)
2025 Zagreb	Miwa Morikawa (JPN)	Alina Kasabieva (UWW)	Irina Rîngaci (MDA)
2025 Zagreb	Miwa Morikawa (JPN)	Alina Kasabieva (UWW)	Tüvshinjargalyn Enkhjin (MGL)
2026 Astana	Alina Kasabieva (RUS)	Irina Rîngaci (MDA)	Feng Yongxin (CHN)
2026 Astana	Alina Kasabieva (RUS)	Irina Rîngaci (MDA)	Nana Ikehata (JPN)

== Light heavyweight ==
- 70 kg: 1987–1996
- 68 kg: 1997–2001
- 67 kg: 2002–2013
- 69 kg: 2014–2017
- 68 kg: 2018–

Games	Gold	Silver	Bronze
1987 Lørenskog	Georgette Jean (FRA)	Rika Iwama (JPN)	Hege Reitan (NOR)
1989 Martigny	Georgette Jean (FRA)	Leia Kawaii (USA)	Rika Iwama (JPN)
1990 Luleå	Rika Iwama (JPN)	Emmanuelle Blind (FRA)	Laura Martínez (ARG)
1991 Tokyo	Yayoi Urano (JPN)	Emmanuelle Blind (FRA)	Mirna Martínez (VEN)
1992 Villeurbanne	Xiomara Guevara (VEN)	Yayoi Urano (JPN)	Chen Chin-ping (TPE)
1993 Stavern	Yayoi Urano (JPN)	Christine Nordhagen (CAN)	Chen Chin-ping (TPE)
1994 Sofia	Christine Nordhagen (CAN)	Elmira Kurbanova (RUS)	Mikiko Miyazaki (JPN)
1995 Moscow	Lise Golliot (FRA)	Elmira Kurbanova (RUS)	Nina Englich (GER)
1996 Sofia	Christine Nordhagen (CAN)	Galina Ivanova (BUL)	Lise Golliot (FRA)
1997 Clermont-Ferrand	Christine Nordhagen (CAN)	Sandra Bacher (USA)	Nina Englich (GER)
1998 Poznań	Christine Nordhagen (CAN)	Stéphanie Groß (GER)	Sandra Bacher (USA)
1999 Boden	Sandra Bacher (USA)	Anita Schätzle (GER)	Anna Shamova (RUS)
2000 Sofia	Kristie Marano (USA)	Anna Shamova (RUS)	Tomoe Miyamoto (JPN)
2001 Sofia	Christine Nordhagen (CAN)	Toccara Montgomery (USA)	Anita Schätzle (GER)
2002 Chalcis	Kateryna Burmistrova (UKR)	Lise Legrand (FRA)	Kristie Marano (USA)
2003 New York City	Kristie Marano (USA)	Ewelina Pruszko (POL)	Svetlana Martinenko (RUS)
2005 Budapest	Meng Lili (CHN)	Martine Dugrenier (CAN)	Elena Perepelkina (RUS)
2005 Budapest	Meng Lili (CHN)	Martine Dugrenier (CAN)	Katie Downing (USA)
2006 Guangzhou	Jing Ruixue (CHN)	Martine Dugrenier (CAN)	Maria Müller (GER)
2006 Guangzhou	Jing Ruixue (CHN)	Martine Dugrenier (CAN)	Eri Sakamoto (JPN)
2007 Baku	Jing Ruixue (CHN)	Martine Dugrenier (CAN)	Natalia Kuksina (RUS)
2007 Baku	Jing Ruixue (CHN)	Martine Dugrenier (CAN)	Katie Downing (USA)
2008 Tokyo	Martine Dugrenier (CAN)	Mami Shinkai (JPN)	Ochirbatyn Nasanburmaa (MGL)
2008 Tokyo	Martine Dugrenier (CAN)	Mami Shinkai (JPN)	Kateryna Burmistrova (UKR)
2009 Herning	Martine Dugrenier (CAN)	Yulia Bartnovskaya (RUS)	Badrakhyn Odonchimeg (MGL)
2009 Herning	Martine Dugrenier (CAN)	Yulia Bartnovskaya (RUS)	Ifeoma Iheanacho (NGR)
2010 Moscow	Martine Dugrenier (CAN)	Yelena Shalygina (KAZ)	Ifeoma Iheanacho (NGR)
2010 Moscow	Martine Dugrenier (CAN)	Yelena Shalygina (KAZ)	Alla Cherkasova (UKR)
2011 Istanbul	Xiluo Zhuoma (CHN)	Banzragchiin Oyuunsüren (MGL)	Yoshiko Inoue (JPN)
2011 Istanbul	Xiluo Zhuoma (CHN)	Banzragchiin Oyuunsüren (MGL)	Adeline Gray (USA)
2012 Strathcona County	Adeline Gray (USA)	Dorothy Yeats (CAN)	Hong Yan (CHN)
2012 Strathcona County	Adeline Gray (USA)	Dorothy Yeats (CAN)	Yoshiko Inoue (JPN)
2013 Budapest	Alina Stadnyk (UKR)	Stacie Anaka (CAN)	Sara Dosho (JPN)
2013 Budapest	Alina Stadnyk (UKR)	Stacie Anaka (CAN)	Ochirbatyn Nasanburmaa (MGL)
2014 Tashkent	Aline Focken (GER)	Sara Dosho (JPN)	Laura Skujiņa (LAT)
2014 Tashkent	Aline Focken (GER)	Sara Dosho (JPN)	Natalia Vorobieva (RUS)
2015 Las Vegas	Natalia Vorobieva (RUS)	Zhou Feng (CHN)	Aline Focken (GER)
2015 Las Vegas	Natalia Vorobieva (RUS)	Zhou Feng (CHN)	Sara Dosho (JPN)
2017 Paris	Sara Dosho (JPN)	Aline Focken (GER)	Han Yue (CHN)
2017 Paris	Sara Dosho (JPN)	Aline Focken (GER)	Koumba Larroque (FRA)
2018 Budapest	Alla Cherkasova (UKR)	Koumba Larroque (FRA)	Zhou Feng (CHN)
2018 Budapest	Alla Cherkasova (UKR)	Koumba Larroque (FRA)	Tamyra Mensah-Stock (USA)
2019 Nur-Sultan	Tamyra Mensah-Stock (USA)	Jenny Fransson (SWE)	Anna Schell (GER)
2019 Nur-Sultan	Tamyra Mensah-Stock (USA)	Jenny Fransson (SWE)	Soronzonboldyn Battsetseg (MGL)
2021 Oslo	Meerim Zhumanazarova (KGZ)	Rin Miyaji (JPN)	Khanum Velieva (RWF)
2021 Oslo	Meerim Zhumanazarova (KGZ)	Rin Miyaji (JPN)	Tamyra Mensah-Stock (USA)
2022 Belgrade	Tamyra Mensah-Stock (USA)	Ami Ishii (JPN)	Linda Morais (CAN)
2022 Belgrade	Tamyra Mensah-Stock (USA)	Ami Ishii (JPN)	Irina Rîngaci (MDA)
2023 Belgrade	Buse Tosun Çavuşoğlu (TUR)	Enkhsaikhany Delgermaa (MGL)	Koumba Larroque (FRA)
2023 Belgrade	Buse Tosun Çavuşoğlu (TUR)	Enkhsaikhany Delgermaa (MGL)	Irina Rîngaci (MDA)
2025 Zagreb	Ami Ishii (JPN)	Yuliana Yaneva (BUL)	Long Jia (CHN)
2025 Zagreb	Ami Ishii (JPN)	Yuliana Yaneva (BUL)	Kennedy Blades (USA)
2026 Astana	Long Jia (CHN)	Meerim Zhumanazarova (KGZ)	Adéla Hanzlíčková (CZE)
2026 Astana	Long Jia (CHN)	Meerim Zhumanazarova (KGZ)	Kennedy Blades (USA)

== First heavyweight ==
- 72 kg: 2018–

Games	Gold	Silver	Bronze
2018 Budapest	Justina Di Stasio (CAN)	Ochirbatyn Nasanburmaa (MGL)	Martina Kuenz (AUT)
2018 Budapest	Justina Di Stasio (CAN)	Ochirbatyn Nasanburmaa (MGL)	Buse Tosun (TUR)
2019 Nur-Sultan	Natalia Vorobieva (RUS)	Alina Berezhna (UKR)	Paliha (CHN)
2019 Nur-Sultan	Natalia Vorobieva (RUS)	Alina Berezhna (UKR)	Masako Furuichi (JPN)
2021 Oslo	Masako Furuichi (JPN)	Zhamila Bakbergenova (KAZ)	Anna Schell (GER)
2021 Oslo	Masako Furuichi (JPN)	Zhamila Bakbergenova (KAZ)	Buse Tosun Çavuşoğlu (TUR)
2022 Belgrade	Amit Elor (USA)	Zhamila Bakbergenova (KAZ)	Masako Furuichi (JPN)
2022 Belgrade	Amit Elor (USA)	Zhamila Bakbergenova (KAZ)	Alexandra Anghel (ROU)
2023 Belgrade	Amit Elor (USA)	Enkh-Amaryn Davaanasan (MGL)	Miwa Morikawa (JPN)
2023 Belgrade	Amit Elor (USA)	Enkh-Amaryn Davaanasan (MGL)	Zhamila Bakbergenova (KAZ)
2024 Tirana	Ami Ishii (JPN)	Zhamila Bakbergenova (KAZ)	Adéla Hanzlíčková (CZE)
2024 Tirana	Ami Ishii (JPN)	Zhamila Bakbergenova (KAZ)	Kylie Welker (USA)
2025 Zagreb	Alla Belinska (UKR)	Nesrin Baş (TUR)	Li Zelu (CHN)
2025 Zagreb	Alla Belinska (UKR)	Nesrin Baş (TUR)	Nurzat Nurtaeva (KGZ)
2026 Astana	Li Zelu (CHN)	Wiktoria Chołuj (POL)	Tanu Sharma (IND)
2026 Astana	Li Zelu (CHN)	Wiktoria Chołuj (POL)	Mahiro Yoshitake (JPN)

== Heavyweight ==
- 75 kg: 1987–2001
- 72 kg: 2002–2013
- 75 kg: 2014–2017
- 76 kg: 2018–

Games	Gold	Silver	Bronze
1987 Lørenskog	Patricia Rossignol (FRA)	Miyako Shimizu (JPN)	None awarded
1989 Martigny	Miyako Shimizu (JPN)	Kirsten Borgen (NOR)	None awarded
1990 Luleå	Yayoi Urano (JPN)	Ma Su-hui (TPE)	Helen Mitzifiri (GRE)
1991 Tokyo	Liu Dongfeng (CHN)	Jeun Kyung-ran (KOR)	Liudmila Golikova (URS)
1992 Villeurbanne	Liu Dongfeng (CHN)	Mitsuko Funakoshi (JPN)	Linda Johnsen-Holmeide (NOR)
1993 Stavern	Liu Dongfeng (CHN)	Mikiko Miyazaki (JPN)	Linda Johnsen-Holmeide (NOR)
1994 Sofia	Mitsuko Funakoshi (JPN)	Evgenia Osipenko (RUS)	Elisaveta Toleva (BUL)
1995 Moscow	Liu Dongfeng (CHN)	Mitsuko Funakoshi (JPN)	Tetyana Komarnytskaya (UKR)
1996 Sofia	Liu Dongfeng (CHN)	Kristie Stenglein (USA)	Sha Ling-li (TPE)
1997 Clermont-Ferrand	Kyoko Hamaguchi (JPN)	Kristie Stenglein (USA)	Liu Dongfeng (CHN)
1998 Poznań	Kyoko Hamaguchi (JPN)	Kristie Stenglein (USA)	Edyta Witkowska (POL)
1999 Boden	Kyoko Hamaguchi (JPN)	Kristie Marano (USA)	Christine Nordhagen (CAN)
2000 Sofia	Christine Nordhagen (CAN)	Edyta Witkowska (POL)	Kyoko Hamaguchi (JPN)
2001 Sofia	Edyta Witkowska (POL)	Ma Bailing (CHN)	Nina Englich (GER)
2002 Chalcis	Kyoko Hamaguchi (JPN)	Wang Xu (CHN)	Edyta Witkowska (POL)
2003 New York City	Kyoko Hamaguchi (JPN)	Toccara Montgomery (USA)	Wang Xu (CHN)
2005 Budapest	Iris Smith (USA)	Kyoko Hamaguchi (JPN)	Anita Schätzle (GER)
2005 Budapest	Iris Smith (USA)	Kyoko Hamaguchi (JPN)	Svetlana Saenko (UKR)
2006 Guangzhou	Stanka Zlateva (BUL)	Kyoko Hamaguchi (JPN)	Elena Perepelkina (RUS)
2006 Guangzhou	Stanka Zlateva (BUL)	Kyoko Hamaguchi (JPN)	Kristie Marano (USA)
2007 Baku	Stanka Zlateva (BUL)	Kristie Marano (USA)	Olga Zhanibekova (KAZ)
2007 Baku	Stanka Zlateva (BUL)	Kristie Marano (USA)	Guzel Manyurova (RUS)
2008 Tokyo	Stanka Zlateva (BUL)	Hong Yan (CHN)	Ohenewa Akuffo (CAN)
2008 Tokyo	Stanka Zlateva (BUL)	Hong Yan (CHN)	Kyoko Hamaguchi (JPN)
2009 Herning	Qin Xiaoqing (CHN)	Ochirbatyn Burmaa (MGL)	Stanka Zlateva (BUL)
2009 Herning	Qin Xiaoqing (CHN)	Ochirbatyn Burmaa (MGL)	Maider Unda (ESP)
2010 Moscow	Stanka Zlateva (BUL)	Ohenewa Akuffo (CAN)	Kyoko Hamaguchi (JPN)
2010 Moscow	Stanka Zlateva (BUL)	Ohenewa Akuffo (CAN)	Ekaterina Bukina (RUS)
2011 Istanbul	Stanka Zlateva (BUL)	Ekaterina Bukina (RUS)	Vasilisa Marzaliuk (BLR)
2011 Istanbul	Stanka Zlateva (BUL)	Ekaterina Bukina (RUS)	Ali Bernard (USA)
2012 Strathcona County	Jenny Fransson (SWE)	Guzel Manyurova (KAZ)	Vasilisa Marzaliuk (BLR)
2012 Strathcona County	Jenny Fransson (SWE)	Guzel Manyurova (KAZ)	Xu Qing (CHN)
2013 Budapest	Zhang Fengliu (CHN)	Natalia Vorobieva (RUS)	Ochirbatyn Burmaa (MGL)
2013 Budapest	Zhang Fengliu (CHN)	Natalia Vorobieva (RUS)	Adeline Gray (USA)
2014 Tashkent	Adeline Gray (USA)	Aline Ferreira (BRA)	Zhou Qian (CHN)
2014 Tashkent	Adeline Gray (USA)	Aline Ferreira (BRA)	Ochirbatyn Burmaa (MGL)
2015 Las Vegas	Adeline Gray (USA)	Zhou Qian (CHN)	Vasilisa Marzaliuk (BLR)
2015 Las Vegas	Adeline Gray (USA)	Zhou Qian (CHN)	Epp Mäe (EST)
2017 Paris	Yasemin Adar (TUR)	Vasilisa Marzaliuk (BLR)	Justina Di Stasio (CAN)
2017 Paris	Yasemin Adar (TUR)	Vasilisa Marzaliuk (BLR)	Hiroe Suzuki (JPN)
2018 Budapest	Adeline Gray (USA)	Yasemin Adar (TUR)	Erica Wiebe (CAN)
2018 Budapest	Adeline Gray (USA)	Yasemin Adar (TUR)	Hiroe Minagawa (JPN)
2019 Nur-Sultan	Adeline Gray (USA)	Hiroe Minagawa (JPN)	Epp Mäe (EST)
2019 Nur-Sultan	Adeline Gray (USA)	Hiroe Minagawa (JPN)	Aline Rotter-Focken (GER)
2021 Oslo	Adeline Gray (USA)	Epp Mäe (EST)	Samar Amer (EGY)
2021 Oslo	Adeline Gray (USA)	Epp Mäe (EST)	Aiperi Medet Kyzy (KGZ)
2022 Belgrade	Yasemin Adar Yiğit (TUR)	Samar Amer (EGY)	Epp Mäe (EST)
2022 Belgrade	Yasemin Adar Yiğit (TUR)	Samar Amer (EGY)	Yuka Kagami (JPN)
2023 Belgrade	Yuka Kagami (JPN)	Aiperi Medet Kyzy (KGZ)	Tatiana Rentería (COL)
2023 Belgrade	Yuka Kagami (JPN)	Aiperi Medet Kyzy (KGZ)	Adeline Gray (USA)
2025 Zagreb	Génesis Reasco (ECU)	Aiperi Medet Kyzy (KGZ)	Milaimys Marín (CUB)
2025 Zagreb	Génesis Reasco (ECU)	Aiperi Medet Kyzy (KGZ)	Kylie Welker (USA)
2026 Astana	Anastasiya Alpyeyeva (UKR)	Kajal Dhochak (IND)	Enkh-Amaryn Davaanasan (MGL)
2026 Astana	Anastasiya Alpyeyeva (UKR)	Kajal Dhochak (IND)	Dymond Guilford (USA)

== Medal table ==
Rank	Nation	Gold	Silver	Bronze	Total
1	Japan	112	45	47	204
2	China	31	21	38	90
3	United States	28	39	42	109
4	France	22	16	18	56
5	Canada	12	13	27	52
6	Ukraine	12	11	23	46
7	Norway	11	13	22	46
8	Russia	8	27	37	72
9	Bulgaria	7	6	8	21
10	Sweden	5	10	18	33
11	Austria	5	1	1	7
12	Mongolia	4	13	24	41
13	Kyrgyzstan	4	3	3	10
14	Azerbaijan	3	6	8	17
15	Venezuela	3	4	5	12
16	North Korea	3	3	8	14
17	Turkey	3	3	6	12
18	Germany	2	6	16	24
19	Poland	2	5	12	19
20	Belarus	2	5	9	16
21	Moldova	2	3	4	9
22	Chinese Taipei	1	5	6	12
23	India	1	3	10	14
24	Hungary	1	2	4	7
25	Ecuador	1	2	1	4
26	Finland	1	1	0	2
27	Greece	1	0	4	5
28	Belgium	1	0	0	1
29	Kazakhstan	0	7	9	16
30	Romania	0	3	3	6
–	United World Wrestling (Note: Wrestlers from India at the 2023 World Championships and Russia at the 2025 World Championships were not permitted to use the name, flag, or anthem of their countries. They instead participated under the name and the flag of the United World Wrestling (UWW), their medals were not included in the official medal table.)	0	2	4	6
31	Nigeria	0	1	5	6
32	Estonia	0	1	3	4
33	Denmark	0	1	1	2
33	Egypt	0	1	1	2
33	Italy	0	1	1	2
33	Netherlands	0	1	1	2
–	Individual Neutral Athletes (Note: At the 2023 and 2024 World Championships, in accordance with sanctions imposed following by the 2022 Russian invasion of Ukraine, wrestlers from Russia and Belarus were not permitted to use the name, flag, or anthem of Russia or Belarus. They instead participated as "Individual Neutral Athletes (AIN)", their medals were not included in the official medal table.)	0	1	1	2
37	Brazil	0	1	0	1
37	South Korea	0	1	0	1
37	Tunisia	0	1	0	1
40	Czech Republic	0	0	3	3
40	Latvia	0	0	3	3
42	Colombia	0	0	2	2
42	Cuba	0	0	2	2
42	Russian Wrestling Federation (Note: At the 2021 World Championships, in accordance with a ban by the World Anti-Doping Agency (WADA), wrestlers from Russia were not permitted to use the Russian name, flag, or anthem. They instead participated under the name and the modified flag of the Russian Wrestling Federation (RWF).)	0	0	2	2
42	Spain	0	0	2	2
46	Argentina	0	0	1	1
46	Great Britain	0	0	1	1
46	Puerto Rico	0	0	1	1
46	Soviet Union	0	0	1	1
46	Switzerland	0	0	1	1
Totals (50 entries)		288	288	449	1,025

- Names in italic are national entities that no longer exist.
