= 1999 World Wrestling Championships – Women's freestyle 46 kg =

Women's freestyle 46 kg at the 1999 World Championships
- Venue: Hildursborg
- Dates: 10–12 September 1999
- Competitors: 11 from 11 nations

Medalists
gold medal	Tricia Saunders	United States
silver medal	Zhong Xiue	China
bronze medal	Inga Karamchakova	Russia

The women's freestyle 46 kilograms is a competition featured at the 1999 World Wrestling Championships, and was held at the Stadium Hildursborg in Boden, Sweden from 10 to 12 September 1999.

== Results ==
=== Preliminary round ===
==== Pool 1 ====
Pos	Athlete	Pld	W	L	CP	TP	USA	UKR	CAN
1	Tricia Saunders (USA)	2	2	0	7	15	—	5–1	10–0
2	Yuliya Voitova (UKR)	2	1	1	5	8	1–3 PP	—	7–0 Fall
3	Lyndsay Belisle (CAN)	2	0	2	0	0	0–4 ST	0–4 TO	—

Source: Official website

==== Pool 2 ====
Pos	Athlete	Pld	W	L	CP	TP	CHN	NOR	VEN	SWE
1	Zhong Xiue (CHN)	3	3	0	12	27	—	5–0 Fall	10–0	12–1
2	Mette Barlie (NOR)	3	2	1	6	19	0–4 TO	—	10–4	9–1
3	Ángela Castellanos (VEN)	3	1	2	4	13	0–4 ST	1–3 PP	—	9–3
4	Helena Honkamaa (SWE)	3	0	3	3	5	1–4 SP	1–3 PP	1–3 PP	—

Source: Official website

==== Pool 3 ====
Pos	Athlete	Pld	W	L	CP	TP	RUS	JPN	FRA	AUS
1	Inga Karamchakova (RUS)	3	3	0	11	25	—	4–0	12–0	9–1 Fall
2	Shoko Yoshimura (JPN)	3	2	1	7	12	0–3 PO	—	8–0 Fall	4–1
3	Farah Touchi (FRA)	3	1	2	3	3	0–4 ST	0–4 TO	—	3–1
4	Lila Ristevska (AUS)	3	0	3	2	3	0–4 TO	1–3 PP	1–3 PP	—

Source: Official website

=== Knockout round ===
Semifinals
Tricia Saunders (USA)	5
Inga Karamchakova (RUS)	3
Zhong Xiue (CHN)	10
Shoko Yoshimura (JPN)	1

Final
Tricia Saunders (USA)	4
Zhong Xiue (CHN)	2
Bronze medal match
Inga Karamchakova (RUS)	3
Shoko Yoshimura (JPN)	1
