= 1998 World Wrestling Championships – Women's freestyle 51 kg =

Women's freestyle 51 kg at the 1998 World Championships
- Venue: Hala Arena
- Dates: 8–10 October 1998
- Competitors: 16 from 16 nations

Medalists
gold medal	Atsuko Shinomura	Japan
silver medal	Ida Hellström	Sweden
bronze medal	Elena Egoshina	Russia

The women's freestyle 51 kilograms is a competition featured at the 1998 World Wrestling Championships, and was held in Poznań, Poland from 8 to 10 October 1998.

== Results ==
=== Round 1 ===
	Score	
Round of 16
Elena Egoshina (RUS)	3–2	Stephanie Murata (USA)
Teresa Piotrowski (CAN)	4–0 Fall	Agnieszka Pająk (POL)
Myrsini Koloni (GRE)	4–0 Fall	Olina Orlovská (CZE)
Angélique Hidalgo (FRA)	0–8 Fall	Atsuko Shinomura (JPN)
Zhou Xiaoyi (CHN)	0–5 Fall	Ida Hellström (SWE)
Alexandra Hinterbauer (AUT)	0–4	Tanja Sauter (GER)
Amanda D'Rozario (AUS)	0–9 Fall	Annalisa Debiasi (ITA)
Nadezhda Romashova (UZB)	0–7 Fall	Inessa Rebar (UKR)

=== Round 2 ===
	Score	
Quarterfinals
Elena Egoshina (RUS)	4–5	Teresa Piotrowski (CAN)
Myrsini Koloni (GRE)	0–12	Atsuko Shinomura (JPN)
Ida Hellström (SWE)	7–2	Tanja Sauter (GER)
Annalisa Debiasi (ITA)	0–4 Fall	Inessa Rebar (UKR)
Repechage
Stephanie Murata (USA)	7–0	Agnieszka Pająk (POL)
Olina Orlovská (CZE)	0–4 Fall	Angélique Hidalgo (FRA)
Zhou Xiaoyi (CHN)	4–2	Alexandra Hinterbauer (AUT)
Amanda D'Rozario (AUS)	3–9 Fall	Nadezhda Romashova (UZB)

=== Round 3 ===
	Score	
Semifinals
Teresa Piotrowski (CAN)	0–4 Fall	Atsuko Shinomura (JPN)
Ida Hellström (SWE)	2–0	Inessa Rebar (UKR)
Repechage
Stephanie Murata (USA)	9–4 Fall	Angélique Hidalgo (FRA)
Zhou Xiaoyi (CHN)	7–0 Fall	Nadezhda Romashova (UZB)
Elena Egoshina (RUS)	4–0 Fall	Myrsini Koloni (GRE)
Tanja Sauter (GER)	3–1 Fall	Annalisa Debiasi (ITA)

=== Round 4 ===
	Score	
Repechage
Stephanie Murata (USA)	7–0 Fall	Zhou Xiaoyi (CHN)
Elena Egoshina (RUS)	8–6 Fall	Tanja Sauter (GER)

=== Round 5 ===
	Score	
Repechage
Teresa Piotrowski (CAN)	2–5	Stephanie Murata (USA)
Elena Egoshina (RUS)	4–0 Fall	Inessa Rebar (UKR)

=== Finals ===
	Score	
Bronze medal match
Stephanie Murata (USA)	2–6	Elena Egoshina (RUS)
Final
Atsuko Shinomura (JPN)	7–0	Ida Hellström (SWE)
