= 1998 World Wrestling Championships – Women's freestyle 46 kg =

Women's freestyle 46 kg at the 1998 World Championships
- Venue: Hala Arena
- Dates: 8–10 October 1998
- Competitors: 13 from 13 nations

Medalists
gold medal	Tricia Saunders	United States
silver medal	Miyu Yamamoto	Japan
bronze medal	Inga Karamchakova	Russia

The women's freestyle 46 kilograms is a competition featured at the 1998 World Wrestling Championships, and was held in Poznań, Poland from 8 to 10 October 1998.

== Results ==
=== Round 1 ===
	Score	
Round of 16
Ilmira Gazizova (UZB)	0–6 Fall	Lila Ristevska (AUS)
Zhong Xiue (CHN)	5–1	Farah Touchi (FRA)
Inga Karamchakova (RUS)	2–6	Mette Barlie (NOR)
Fani Psatha (GRE)	10–0	Tania DeBenedetti (CAN)
Vladislava Petrova (BUL)	0–6 Fall	Tricia Saunders (USA)
Marta Wojtanowska (POL)	1–7	Yuliya Voitova (UKR)
Miyu Yamamoto (JPN)		Bye

=== Round 2 ===
	Score	
Quarterfinals
Miyu Yamamoto (JPN)	11–0 Fall	Lila Ristevska (AUS)
Zhong Xiue (CHN)	2–4 Fall	Mette Barlie (NOR)
Fani Psatha (GRE)	0–4	Tricia Saunders (USA)
Yuliya Voitova (UKR)		Bye
Repechage
Ilmira Gazizova (UZB)	0–4 Fall	Farah Touchi (FRA)
Inga Karamchakova (RUS)	7–3	Tania DeBenedetti (CAN)
Vladislava Petrova (BUL)	4–6	Marta Wojtanowska (POL)

=== Round 3 ===
	Score	
Semifinals
Yuliya Voitova (UKR)	0–4	Miyu Yamamoto (JPN)
Mette Barlie (NOR)	2–3	Tricia Saunders (USA)
Repechage
Farah Touchi (FRA)	0–5	Inga Karamchakova (RUS)
Marta Wojtanowska (POL)	0–5 Fall	Lila Ristevska (AUS)
Zhong Xiue (CHN)	9–1	Fani Psatha (GRE)

=== Round 4 ===
	Score	
Repechage
Inga Karamchakova (RUS)	11–0	Lila Ristevska (AUS)
Zhong Xiue (CHN)		Bye

=== Round 5 ===
	Score	
Repechage
Yuliya Voitova (UKR)	6–2	Mette Barlie (NOR)
Zhong Xiue (CHN)	1–6	Inga Karamchakova (RUS)

=== Finals ===
	Score	
Bronze medal match
Yuliya Voitova (UKR)	0–4	Inga Karamchakova (RUS)
Final
Miyu Yamamoto (JPN)	1–1	Tricia Saunders (USA)
