= 1999 World Wrestling Championships – Women's freestyle 75 kg =

Women's freestyle 75 kg at the 1999 World Championships
- Venue: Hildursborg
- Dates: 10–12 September 1999
- Competitors: 13 from 13 nations

Medalists
gold medal	Kyoko Hamaguchi	Japan
silver medal	Kristie Marano	United States
bronze medal	Christine Nordhagen	Canada

The women's freestyle 75 kilograms is a competition featured at the 1999 World Wrestling Championships, and was held at the Stadium Hildursborg in Boden, Sweden from 10 to 12 September 1999.

== Results ==
Legend

- F — Won by fall

=== Preliminary round ===
==== Pool 1 ====
Pos	Athlete	Pld	W	L	CP	TP	CAN	POL	VEN
1	Christine Nordhagen (CAN)	2	2	0	7	22	—	11–2	11–0
2	Edyta Witkowska (POL)	2	1	1	5	12	1–3 PP	—	10–0
3	Mariana Amado (VEN)	2	0	2	0	0	0–4 ST	0–4 ST	—

Source: Official website

==== Pool 2 ====
Pos	Athlete	Pld	W	L	CP	TP	JPN	UKR	SWE
1	Kyoko Hamaguchi (JPN)	2	2	0	7	12	—	4–0 Fall	8–1
2	Tetyana Komarnytskaya (UKR)	2	1	1	4	5	0–4 TO	—	5–0 Fall
3	Helene Karlsson (SWE)	2	0	2	1	1	1–3 PP	0–4 TO	—

Source: Official website

==== Pool 3 ====
Pos	Athlete	Pld	W	L	CP	TP	AUT	FIN	BUL
1	Elvira Barriga (AUT)	2	2	0	7	17	—	6–1	11–1
2	Heidi Martti (FIN)	2	1	1	4	11	1–3 PP	—	10–1
3	Elisaveta Toleva (BUL)	2	0	2	2	2	1–4 SP	1–3 PP	—

Source: Official website

==== Pool 4 ====
Pos	Athlete	Pld	W	L	CP	TP	USA	KGZ	NOR	RUS
1	Kristie Marano (USA)	3	3	0	12	22	—	13–3	6–2 Fall	3–0 Fall
2	Yana Panova (KGZ)	3	1	2	5	6	1–4 SP	—	3–0 Fall	0–4 Fall
3	May Bente Eriksen (NOR)	3	1	2	4	9	0–4 TO	0–4 TO	—	7–1 Fall
4	Elena Jirnova (RUS)	3	1	2	4	5	0–4 TO	4–0 TO	0–4 TO	—

Source: Official website

=== Knockout round ===
Semifinals
Christine Nordhagen (CAN)	3
Kyoko Hamaguchi (JPN)	5
Elvira Barriga (AUT)	3
Kristie Marano (USA)	5^{F}

Final
Kyoko Hamaguchi (JPN)	6^{F}
Kristie Marano (USA)	1
Bronze medal match
Christine Nordhagen (CAN)	2^{F}
Elvira Barriga (AUT)	0
