= 1989 World Wrestling Championships =

- Host city: Martigny, Switzerland
- Dates: 24 August – 3 September 1989

Champions
- Freestyle: Soviet Union
- Greco-Roman: Soviet Union
- Women: Japan

The 1989 World Wrestling Championships were held in Martigny, Switzerland.

== Medal table ==
Rank	Nation	Gold	Silver	Bronze	Total
1	Soviet Union	9	4	4	17
2	France	4	1	2	7
3	United States	2	7	1	10
4	Norway	2	4	2	8
5	Japan	2	3	3	8
6	Bulgaria	2	1	2	5
7	West Germany	2	0	2	4
8	Chinese Taipei	1	2	0	3
9	Hungary	1	1	2	4
9	South Korea	1	1	2	4
11	Iran	1	1	1	3
12	North Korea	1	1	0	2
13	East Germany	1	0	2	3
14	Canada	0	1	0	1
14	Romania	0	1	0	1
14	Turkey	0	1	0	1
17	Sweden	0	0	2	2
18	Cuba	0	0	1	1
18	Mongolia	0	0	1	1
18	Switzerland	0	0	1	1
Totals (20 entries)		29	29	28	86

== Team ranking ==
Rank	Men's freestyle		Men's Greco-Roman		Women's freestyle	
Rank	Team	Points	Team	Points	Team	Points
1	Soviet Union	79	Soviet Union	90	Japan	72
2	United States	70	Hungary	53	Norway	69
3	Turkey	49	Bulgaria	45	Chinese Taipei	56
4	Bulgaria	42	Hungary	44	France	53
5	Iran	37	South Korea	35	United States	32
6	North Korea	37	United States	35	Venezuela	24

== Medal summary ==
=== Men's freestyle ===
Event	Gold	Silver	Bronze
48 kg	Kim Jong-shin; South Korea	Ri Hak-son; North Korea	Gnel Medzhlumyan; Soviet Union
52 kg	Valentin Yordanov; Bulgaria	Vladimir Toguzov; Soviet Union	Majid Torkan; Iran
57 kg	Kim Yong-sik; North Korea	Askari Mohammadian; Iran	Rumen Pavlov; Bulgaria
62 kg	John Smith; United States	Gary Bohay; Canada	Karsten Polky; East Germany
68 kg	Boris Budaev; Soviet Union	Kosei Akaishi; Japan	Ahmet Çakıcı; West Germany
74 kg	Kenny Monday; United States	Arsen Fadzaev; Soviet Union	Lodoin Erkhbayar; Mongolia
82 kg	Elmadi Zhabrailov; Soviet Union	Melvin Douglas; United States	Alcide Legrand; France
90 kg	Makharbek Khadartsev; Soviet Union	Jim Scherr; United States	Gábor Tóth; Hungary
100 kg	Akhmed Atavov; Soviet Union	Bill Scherr; United States	Uwe Neupert; East Germany
130 kg	Alireza Soleimani; Iran	Bruce Baumgartner; United States	Aslan Khadartsev; Soviet Union

=== Men's Greco-Roman ===
Event	Gold	Silver	Bronze
48 kg	Oleg Kucherenko; Soviet Union	Lars Rønningen; Norway	Goun Duk-yong; South Korea
52 kg	Aleksandr Ignatenko; Soviet Union	Remzi Öztürk; Turkey	An Han-bong; South Korea
57 kg	Emil Ivanov; Bulgaria	Aleksandr Shestakov; Soviet Union	András Sike; Hungary
62 kg	Kamandar Madzhidov; Soviet Union	Huh Byung-ho; South Korea	Mario Olivera; Cuba
68 kg	Claudio Passarelli; West Germany	Ghani Yalouz; France	Levon Julfalakyan; Soviet Union
74 kg	Daulet Turlykhanov; Soviet Union	Anton Arghira; Romania	Petar Tenev; Bulgaria
82 kg	Tibor Komáromi; Hungary	Mikhail Mamiashvili; Soviet Union	Magnus Fredriksson; Sweden
90 kg	Maik Bullmann; East Germany	Michial Foy; United States	Roger Gries; West Germany
100 kg	Gerhard Himmel; West Germany	Ilia Georgiev; Bulgaria	Anatoly Fedorenko; Soviet Union
130 kg	Aleksandr Karelin; Soviet Union	László Klauz; Hungary	Tomas Johansson; Sweden

=== Women's freestyle ===
Event	Gold	Silver	Bronze
44 kg	Shoko Yoshimura; Japan	Huang Yu-hsin; Chinese Taipei	Trine Strand; Norway
47 kg	Chen Ming-hsiu; Chinese Taipei	Tomoko Natsumeda; Japan	Afsoon Roshanzamir; United States
50 kg	Anne Holten; Norway	Asia DeWeese; United States	Martine Poupon; France
53 kg	Sylvie van Gucht; France	Chou Yu-ping; Chinese Taipei	Lotte Søvre; Norway
57 kg	Gudrun Høie; Norway	Ryoko Sakamoto; Japan	Inge Krasser; Switzerland
61 kg	Jocelyne Sagon; France	Ine Barlie; Norway	Kimie Hoshikawa; Japan
65 kg	Emmanuelle Blind; France	Nina Nilsen; Norway	Akiko Iijima; Japan
70 kg	Georgette Jean; France	Leia Kawaii; United States	Rika Iwama; Japan
75 kg	Miyako Shimizu; Japan	Kirsten Borgen; Norway	None awarded
