= 1997 World Wrestling Championships – Women's freestyle 51 kg =

Women's freestyle 51 kg at the 1997 World Championships
- Venue: Clermont-Ferrand Sports Hall
- Dates: 10–12 July 1997
- Competitors: 14 from 14 nations

Medalists
gold medal	Joanna Piasecka	Poland
silver medal	Shannon Williams	United States
bronze medal	Miho Adachi	Japan

The women's freestyle 51 kilograms is a competition featured at the 1997 World Wrestling Championships, and was at the Clermont-Ferrand Sports Hall held in Clermont-Ferrand, France from 10 to 12 July 1997.

== Results ==
=== Round 1 ===
	Score	
Round of 16
Lyn Maher (AUS)	3–8	Natalya Nikitenko (UKR)
Huang Chiu-yueh (TPE)	2–4	Joanna Piasecka (POL)
Claudia Porroni (ITA)	0–8 Fall	Miho Adachi (JPN)
Shannon Williams (USA)	3–1	Tanja Sauter (GER)
Konstantina Tsimpanakou (GRE)	1–11	Angélique Hidalgo (FRA)
Elena Egoshina (RUS)	9–0	Liu Hongmei (CHN)
Erica Sharp (CAN)	4–1	Ida Hellström (SWE)

=== Round 2 ===
	Score	
Quarterfinals
Natalya Nikitenko (UKR)	0–7 Fall	Joanna Piasecka (POL)
Miho Adachi (JPN)	1–2	Shannon Williams (USA)
Angélique Hidalgo (FRA)	2–4	Elena Egoshina (RUS)
Erica Sharp (CAN)		Bye
Repechage
Lyn Maher (AUS)	1–4	Huang Chiu-yueh (TPE)
Claudia Porroni (ITA)	0–4 Fall	Tanja Sauter (GER)
Konstantina Tsimpanakou (GRE)	1–10 Fall	Liu Hongmei (CHN)
Ida Hellström (SWE)		Bye

=== Round 3 ===
	Score	
Semifinals
Erica Sharp (CAN)	5–10	Joanna Piasecka (POL)
Shannon Williams (USA)	2–0	Elena Egoshina (RUS)
Repechage
Ida Hellström (SWE)	4–1	Huang Chiu-yueh (TPE)
Tanja Sauter (GER)	7–0 Fall	Liu Hongmei (CHN)
Natalya Nikitenko (UKR)	0–7	Miho Adachi (JPN)
Angélique Hidalgo (FRA)		Bye

=== Round 4 ===
	Score	
Repechage
Angélique Hidalgo (FRA)	4–3	Ida Hellström (SWE)
Tanja Sauter (GER)	0–8 Fall	Miho Adachi (JPN)

=== Round 5 ===
	Score	
Repechage
Erica Sharp (CAN)	2–10	Angélique Hidalgo (FRA)
Miho Adachi (JPN)	7–0	Elena Egoshina (RUS)

=== Finals ===
	Score	
5th place match
Erica Sharp (CAN)	1–1	Elena Egoshina (RUS)
Bronze medal match
Angélique Hidalgo (FRA)	0–6 Fall	Miho Adachi (JPN)
Final
Joanna Piasecka (POL)	8–3	Shannon Williams (USA)
