= Trine Bentzen =

Norwegian sport wrestler (born 1973)

Personal information
- Born: 3 July 1973 (age 53) Oslo, Norway

Sport
- Country: Norway
- Sport: Wrestling
- Club: Sportsklubben av 1909
Medal record
Women’s freestyle wrestling
Representing Norway
World Championships
Bronze medal – third place	1990 Luleå	50 kg

Trine Gjesti Bentzen (born 3 July 1973) is a Norwegian sport wrestler.

She won a bronze medal at the 1990 World Wrestling Championships in Luleå. She also became Nordic champion in 1990. She placed fourth in the 50 kg class at the 1993 World Wrestling Championships in Stavern.
