= 1997 World Wrestling Championships – Women's freestyle 46 kg =

Athletic competition in France

Women's freestyle 46 kg at the 1997 World Championships
- Venue: Clermont-Ferrand Sports Hall
- Dates: 10–12 July 1997
- Competitors: 14 from 14 nations

Medalists
gold medal	Zhong Xiue	China
silver medal	Mette Barlie	Norway
bronze medal	Farah Touchi	France

The women's freestyle 46 kilograms is a competition featured at the 1997 World Wrestling Championships, and was at the Clermont-Ferrand Sports Hall held in Clermont-Ferrand, France from 10 to 12 July 1997.

== Results ==
=== Round 1 ===
	Score	
Round of 16
Yuliya Voitova (UKR)	7–6	Lila Ristevska (AUS)
Tania DeBenedetti (CAN)	0–4	Lidiya Karamchakova (RUS)
Fani Psatha (GRE)	10–4 Fall	Yaritza Mendoza (VEN)
Misato Shimizu (JPN)	1–4	Farah Touchi (FRA)
Almuth Leitgeb (AUT)	4–9	Wu Shu-hua (TPE)
Zhong Xiue (CHN)	12–1	Afsoon Roshanzamir (USA)
Annalisa Debiasi (ITA)	0–8	Mette Barlie (NOR)

=== Round 2 ===
	Score	
Quarterfinals
Yuliya Voitova (UKR)	5–4	Lidiya Karamchakova (RUS)
Fani Psatha (GRE)	3–5	Farah Touchi (FRA)
Wu Shu-hua (TPE)	0–10	Zhong Xiue (CHN)
Mette Barlie (NOR)		Bye
Repechage
Lila Ristevska (AUS)	4–0 Fall	Tania DeBenedetti (CAN)
Yaritza Mendoza (VEN)	0–12 Fall	Misato Shimizu (JPN)
Almuth Leitgeb (AUT)	4–3	Afsoon Roshanzamir (USA)
Annalisa Debiasi (ITA)		Bye

=== Round 3 ===
	Score	
Semifinals
Mette Barlie (NOR)	2–0 Fall	Yuliya Voitova (UKR)
Farah Touchi (FRA)	0–3	Zhong Xiue (CHN)
Repechage
Annalisa Debiasi (ITA)	2–4 Fall	Lila Ristevska (AUS)
Misato Shimizu (JPN)	7–5	Almuth Leitgeb (AUT)
Lidiya Karamchakova (RUS)	3–2	Fani Psatha (GRE)
Wu Shu-hua (TPE)		Bye

=== Round 4 ===
	Score	
Repechage
Wu Shu-hua (TPE)	0–8 Fall	Lila Ristevska (AUS)
Misato Shimizu (JPN)	4–1 Fall	Lidiya Karamchakova (RUS)

=== Round 5 ===
	Score	
Repechage
Yuliya Voitova (UKR)	4–3	Misato Shimizu (JPN)
Lila Ristevska (AUS)	3–10	Farah Touchi (FRA)

=== Finals ===
	Score	
5th place match
Misato Shimizu (JPN)	10–7	Lila Ristevska (AUS)
Bronze medal match
Yuliya Voitova (UKR)	3–4	Farah Touchi (FRA)
Final
Mette Barlie (NOR)	0–10	Zhong Xiue (CHN)
