= Afsoon Roshanzamir =

American freestyle wrestler

Afsoon Roshanzamir Johnston is a former US freestyle wrestler. She was the first woman in the United States to win a medal in wrestling. She was born in Iran, as the only child of her parents.

== Wrestling ==
Initially trained in wrestling by her father, Manu Roshanzamir, Afsoon became a prodigy in wrestling. Afsoon was a cheerleader before approaching her coach to try out for the high school wrestling team. She competed at the 47 kg division. She won a silver medal in the 1990 freestyle wrestling championships. She retired from competition in the year 2000. She served as the woman's coach in the 2016 Olympic Games.

== See also ==
- Women's Wrestling Hall of Fame
- List of World Championships medalists in wrestling (women)
- 1997 World Wrestling Championships – Women's freestyle 46 kg
- 1990 World Wrestling Championships
- 1989 World Wrestling Championships
