= Saniyat Ganachueva =

Russian freestyle wrestler

Personal information
- Nationality: Rutulian

Sport
- Country: Russia
- Sport: Wrestling
- Event: Freestyle
Medal record
Women's freestyle wrestling
Representing Russia
Gold medal – first place	1995 Moscow	50 kg

Saniyat Ganachueva is a Russian freestyle wrestler – the first Russian world champion in women's freestyle wrestling (1995), champion of Russia (1995), silver medalist of the European Championship among juniors (1995), wrestled in the categories up to 50 and 53 kg.

== Career ==
She was born in the village of Shinaz (Dagestan) on March 7, 1977. In 1989, she began to engage in freestyle wrestling. In 1994 she graduated from school #39 in Makhachkala. Graduated from the Institute of Physical Culture of the DSPU.

At the 1995 World Wrestling Championship, held in Moscow, the Russian women's freestyle wrestling team won the first team victory, and Saniyat Ganachueva (weight up to 50 kg) became the first world champion in Russia. Saniyat Ganachuyeva won the duel with Gyula Pérez (Venezuela). At that time, Saniyat was 18 years old, she became the youngest female wrestling world champion. Until today, this is the only time in history when the Russian women's freestyle wrestling team won the team championship at the World Championships.

Saniyat has a sister, Samira, who also did freestyle wrestling and judo, won prizes in championships. At the 1995 World Championships, Samira took 5th place.

== Achievements ==
Year	Tournament	Location	Result	Event
1995	World Championships	Moscow, Russia	1st	Freestyle 50 kg

== See also ==
- 1995 World Wrestling Championships
- List of World Championships medalists in wrestling (women)
