= 1990 World Wrestling Championships =

Freestyle
- Host city: Tokyo, Japan
- Dates: 6–9 September 1990
- Stadium: Tokyo Metropolitan Gymnasium

Greco-Roman
- Host city: Rome, Italy
- Dates: 19–21 November 1990
- Stadium: Palazzetto FlLPJ

Women
- Host city: Luleå, Sweden
- Dates: 29 June – 1 July 1990

Champions
- Freestyle: Soviet Union
- Greco-Roman: Soviet Union
- Women: Japan

The following is the final results of the 1990 World Wrestling Championships. The Men's Freestyle Competition was held in Tokyo, Japan. Men's Greco-Roman Competition was held in Ostia, Rome, Italy and Women's Competition was held in Luleå, Sweden.

== Medal table ==
Rank	Nation	Gold	Silver	Bronze	Total
1	Soviet Union	10	4	4	18
2	Japan	4	2	3	9
3	France	3	1	1	5
4	Cuba	3	0	1	4
5	Germany	2	1	0	3
6	Bulgaria	1	7	2	10
7	United States	1	5	1	7
8	Sweden	1	2	0	3
9	Hungary	1	1	1	3
10	Norway	1	0	4	5
11	Iran	1	0	2	3
12	Czechoslovakia	1	0	1	2
13	Chinese Taipei	0	2	2	4
14	Greece	0	1	1	2
15	Finland	0	1	0	1
15	South Korea	0	1	0	1
15	Venezuela	0	1	0	1
18	Yugoslavia	0	0	2	2
19	Argentina	0	0	1	1
19	Mongolia	0	0	1	1
19	Poland	0	0	1	1
19	Turkey	0	0	1	1
Totals (22 entries)		29	29	29	87

== Team ranking ==
Rank	Men's freestyle		Men's Greco-Roman		Women's freestyle	
Rank	Team	Points	Team	Points	Team	Points
1	Soviet Union	80	Soviet Union	95	Japan	79
2	United States	73	Hungary	49	Norway	56
3	Bulgaria	72	Germany	44	Chinese Taipei	48
4	Iran	41	Yugoslavia	39		
5	Turkey	38	Bulgaria	37		
6	Cuba	33	South Korea	33		
7	Japan	31	Cuba	29		
8	Canada	20	United States	28		
9	Czechoslovakia	19	Japan	26		
10	Romania	18	Poland	24		

== Medal summary ==
=== Men's freestyle ===
Event	Gold	Silver	Bronze
48 kg	Aldo Martínez; Cuba	Marian Avramov; Bulgaria	Takashi Kobayashi; Japan
52 kg	Majid Torkan; Iran	Valentin Yordanov; Bulgaria	Aslan Agaev; Soviet Union
57 kg	Alejandro Puerto; Cuba	Rumen Pavlov; Bulgaria	Sergey Smal; Soviet Union
62 kg	John Smith; United States	Rosen Vasilev; Bulgaria	Gadzhi Rashidov; Soviet Union
68 kg	Arsen Fadzaev; Soviet Union	Georgios Athanasiadis; Greece	Jesús Rodríguez; Cuba
74 kg	Rahmat Sofiadi; Bulgaria	Nasir Gadzhikhanov; Soviet Union	Amir Reza Khadem; Iran
82 kg	Jozef Lohyňa; Czechoslovakia	Royce Alger; United States	Puntsagiin Sükhbat; Mongolia
90 kg	Makharbek Khadartsev; Soviet Union	Chris Campbell; United States	Mohammad Hassan Mohebbi; Iran
100 kg	Leri Khabelov; Soviet Union	Stoyan Nenchev; Bulgaria	Kirk Trost; United States
130 kg	David Gobejishvili; Soviet Union	Bruce Baumgartner; United States	Sezgin Ayık; Turkey

=== Men's Greco-Roman ===
Event	Gold	Silver	Bronze
48 kg	Oleg Kucherenko; Soviet Union	Rayko Marinov; Bulgaria	Yasuichi Ebina; Japan
52 kg	Aleksandr Ignatenko; Soviet Union	An Han-bong; South Korea	Bratan Tsenov; Bulgaria
57 kg	Rıfat Yıldız; Germany	Aleksandr Shestakov; Soviet Union	Patrice Mourier; France
62 kg	Mario Olivera; Cuba	Gennady Atmakin; Soviet Union	Ryszard Wolny; Poland
68 kg	Islam Dugushiev; Soviet Union	Jannis Zamanduridis; Germany	Attila Repka; Hungary
74 kg	Mnatsakan Iskandaryan; Soviet Union	Dobri Ivanov; Bulgaria	Željko Trajković; Yugoslavia
82 kg	Péter Farkas; Hungary	Mikhail Mamiashvili; Soviet Union	Goran Kasum; Yugoslavia
90 kg	Maik Bullmann; Germany	Harri Koskela; Finland	Vyacheslav Oliynyk; Soviet Union
100 kg	Sergey Demyashkevich; Soviet Union	Sándor Major; Hungary	Dušan Masár; Czechoslovakia
130 kg	Aleksandr Karelin; Soviet Union	Tomas Johansson; Sweden	Rangel Gerovski; Bulgaria

=== Women's freestyle ===
Event	Gold	Silver	Bronze
44 kg	Shoko Yoshimura; Japan	Marie Ziegler; United States	Chen Huei-hsiang; Chinese Taipei
47 kg	Åsa Pedersen; Sweden	Afsoon Roshanzamir; United States	Huang Yu-hsin; Chinese Taipei
50 kg	Martine Poupon; France	Helena Honkamaa; Sweden	Trine Bentzen; Norway
53 kg	Sylvie van Gucht; France	Yoshiko Endo; Japan	Lotte Søvre; Norway
57 kg	Gudrun Høie; Norway	Olga Lugo; Venezuela	Ryoko Sakamoto; Japan
61 kg	Brigitte Siffert; France	Kimie Hoshikawa; Japan	Ine Barlie; Norway
65 kg	Akiko Iijima; Japan	Ling Wu-mei; Chinese Taipei	Line Johansen; Norway
70 kg	Rika Iwama; Japan	Emmanuelle Blind; France	Laura Martínez; Argentina
75 kg	Yayoi Urano; Japan	Ma Su-hui; Chinese Taipei	Helen Mitzifiri; Greece
