= 1994 World Wrestling Championships =

Freestyle
- Host city: Istanbul, Turkey
- Dates: 25–28 August 1994
- Stadium: Abdi İpekçi Arena

Greco-Roman
- Host city: Tampere, Finland
- Dates: 8–11 September 1994

Women
- Host city: Sofia, Bulgaria
- Dates: 6–7 August 1994

Champions
- Freestyle: Turkey
- Greco-Roman: Russia
- Women: Japan

The following is the final results of the 1994 World Wrestling Championships. Men's Freestyle competition were held in Istanbul, Turkey. Men's Greco-Roman competition were held in Tampere, Finland, and Women's competition were held in Sofia, Bulgaria.

== Medal table ==
Rank	Nation	Gold	Silver	Bronze	Total
1	Russia	6	5	5	16
2	Japan	6	0	1	7
3	Germany	4	0	2	6
4	Cuba	3	2	0	5
5	Turkey	2	1	0	3
6	Bulgaria	1	1	2	4
6	Iran	1	1	2	4
8	Poland	1	1	1	3
9	Moldova	1	1	0	2
10	Austria	1	0	0	1
10	Canada	1	0	0	1
10	Kazakhstan	1	0	0	1
10	Norway	1	0	0	1
14	France	0	5	2	7
15	United States	0	3	2	5
16	Azerbaijan	0	3	0	3
17	Belarus	0	2	2	4
18	Ukraine	0	1	4	5
19	Georgia	0	1	1	2
20	Finland	0	1	0	1
20	South Korea	0	1	0	1
22	Sweden	0	0	2	2
23	Czech Republic	0	0	1	1
23	Italy	0	0	1	1
23	Kyrgyzstan	0	0	1	1
Totals (25 entries)		29	29	29	87

== Team ranking ==
Rank	Men's freestyle		Men's Greco-Roman		Women's freestyle	
Rank	Team	Points	Team	Points	Team	Points
1	Turkey	53	Russia	69	Japan	82
2	Russia	53	Ukraine	50	Russia	64.5
3	Cuba	50	Poland	44	France	50
4	Iran	50	Bulgaria	35	United States	49.5
5	Germany	38	Germany	30	Ukraine	39.5
6	Ukraine	36	Cuba	29	Norway	32

== Medal summary ==
=== Men's freestyle ===
Event	Gold	Silver	Bronze
48 kg	Alexis Vila; Cuba	Jung Soon-won; South Korea	Peter Yumshanov; Russia
52 kg	Valentin Yordanov; Bulgaria	Namig Abdullayev; Azerbaijan	Gholamreza Mohammadi; Iran
57 kg	Alejandro Puerto; Cuba	Mohammad Talaei; Iran	Bagavdin Umakhanov; Russia
62 kg	Magomed Azizov; Russia	Sergey Smal; Belarus	Giovanni Schillaci; Italy
68 kg	Alexander Leipold; Germany	Jesús Rodríguez; Cuba	Kenjebek Omuraliev; Kyrgyzstan
74 kg	Turan Ceylan; Turkey	Victor Peicov; Moldova	Behrouz Yari; Iran
82 kg	Lukman Zhabrailov; Moldova	Sebahattin Öztürk; Turkey	Hans Gstöttner; Germany
90 kg	Rasoul Khadem; Iran	Makharbek Khadartsev; Russia	Melvin Douglas; United States
100 kg	Arawat Sabejew; Germany	Davud Magomedov; Azerbaijan	David Musulbes; Russia
130 kg	Mahmut Demir; Turkey	Bruce Baumgartner; United States	Aleksey Medvedev; Belarus

=== Men's Greco-Roman ===
Event	Gold	Silver	Bronze
48 kg	Wilber Sánchez; Cuba	Aleksandr Pavlov; Belarus	Gela Papashvili; Georgia
52 kg	Alfred Ter-Mkrtchyan; Germany	Natig Eyvazov; Azerbaijan	Andriy Kalashnikov; Ukraine
57 kg	Yuriy Melnichenko; Kazakhstan	Aleksandr Ignatenko; Russia	Dennis Hall; United States
62 kg	Sergey Martynov; Russia	Ivan Ivanov; Bulgaria	Włodzimierz Zawadzki; Poland
68 kg	Islam Dugushiev; Russia	Ghani Yalouz; France	Biser Georgiev; Bulgaria
74 kg	Mnatsakan Iskandaryan; Russia	Józef Tracz; Poland	Torbjörn Kornbakk; Sweden
82 kg	Thomas Zander; Germany	Tuomo Karila; Finland	Valery Tsilent; Belarus
90 kg	Gogi Koguashvili; Russia	Vyacheslav Oliynyk; Ukraine	Maik Bullmann; Germany
100 kg	Andrzej Wroński; Poland	Bakur Gogitidze; Georgia	Georgiy Saldadze; Ukraine
130 kg	Aleksandr Karelin; Russia	Héctor Milián; Cuba	Petro Kotok; Ukraine

=== Women's freestyle ===
Event	Gold	Silver	Bronze
44 kg	Shoko Yoshimura; Japan	Tatiana Karamchakova; Russia	Dana Durecová; Czech Republic
47 kg	Miho Kamibayashi; Japan	Margaret LeGates; United States	Hélène Escaich; France
50 kg	Miyu Yamamoto; Japan	Anna Gomis; France	Elena Egoshina; Russia
53 kg	Akemi Kawasaki; Japan	Shannon Williams; United States	Sophie Pluquet; France
57 kg	Line Johansen; Norway	Zohya Dahmani; France	Sara Eriksson; Sweden
61 kg	Nikola Hartmann; Austria	Isabelle Dourthe; France	Natalia Ivanova; Russia
65 kg	Yayoi Urano; Japan	Doris Blind; France	Maria Kremskaya; Ukraine
70 kg	Christine Nordhagen; Canada	Elmira Kurbanova; Russia	Mikiko Miyazaki; Japan
75 kg	Mitsuko Funakoshi; Japan	Evgenia Osipenko; Russia	Elisaveta Toleva; Bulgaria
