= 1995 World Wrestling Championships =

Freestyle
- Host city: Atlanta, United States
- Dates: 10–13 August 1995
- Stadium: Georgia World Congress Center

Greco-Roman
- Host city: Prague, Czech Republic
- Dates: 12–15 October 1995

Women
- Host city: Moscow, Russia
- Dates: 9–10 September 1995

Champions
- Freestyle: United States
- Greco-Roman: Russia
- Women: Russia

The following is the final results of the 1995 World Wrestling Championships. Men's Freestyle Competition were held in Atlanta, Georgia, United States. Men's Greco-Roman Competition were held in Prague, Czech Republic and Women's Competition were held in Moscow, Russia.

== Medal table ==
| Rank | Nation | Gold | Silver | Bronze | Total |
|---|---|---|---|---|---|
| 1 | Russia | 6 | 3 | 7 | 16 |
| 2 | United States | 5 | 0 | 4 | 9 |
| 3 | Japan | 3 | 4 | 1 | 8 |
| 4 | France | 3 | 1 | 1 | 5 |
| 5 | Ukraine | 2 | 0 | 2 | 4 |
| 6 | Turkey | 2 | 0 | 1 | 3 |
| 7 | Sweden | 2 | 0 | 0 | 2 |
| 8 | Iran | 1 | 2 | 1 | 4 |
| 9 | Armenia | 1 | 1 | 2 | 4 |
| 10 | China | 1 | 1 | 1 | 3 |
| 11 | Austria | 1 | 0 | 0 | 1 |
| 11 | Bulgaria | 1 | 0 | 0 | 1 |
| 11 | South Korea | 1 | 0 | 0 | 1 |
| 14 | Germany | 0 | 3 | 4 | 7 |
| 15 | Kazakhstan | 0 | 3 | 0 | 3 |
| 16 | Cuba | 0 | 2 | 3 | 5 |
| 17 | Norway | 0 | 2 | 0 | 2 |
| 18 | Venezuela | 0 | 1 | 1 | 2 |
| 19 | Canada | 0 | 1 | 0 | 1 |
| 19 | Hungary | 0 | 1 | 0 | 1 |
| 19 | Israel | 0 | 1 | 0 | 1 |
| 19 | Moldova | 0 | 1 | 0 | 1 |
| 19 | Poland | 0 | 1 | 0 | 1 |
| 19 | Romania | 0 | 1 | 0 | 1 |
| 25 | Uzbekistan | 0 | 0 | 1 | 1 |
| Totals (25 entries) | | 29 | 29 | 29 | 87 |

== Team ranking ==
| Rank | Men's freestyle | | Men's Greco-Roman | | Women's freestyle | |
| Rank | Team | Points | Team | Points | Team | Points |
|---|---|---|---|---|---|---|
| 1 | United States | 71 | Russia | 75 | Russia | 65 |
| 2 | Iran | 59 | Germany | 39 | Japan | 63 |
| 3 | Russia | 58 | Poland | 31 | France | 48 |
| 4 | Turkey | 35 | Ukraine; United States | 30 | United States | 45 |
| 5 | Cuba | 34 | Ukraine; United States | 30 | China | 31 |
| 6 | Ukraine | 29 | Kazakhstan | 30 | Poland | 26 |
| 7 | Germany | 27 | Sweden | 28 | Venezuela | 25 |
| 8 | Japan | 24 | Turkey | 27 | Ukraine | 25 |
| 9 | Belarus | 22 | Cuba | 27 | Norway | 23 |
| 10 | Armenia | 19 | Armenia | 23 | Canada | 23 |

== Medal summary ==
=== Men's freestyle ===
| Event | Gold | Silver | Bronze |
|---|---|---|---|
| 48 kg | Vugar Orujov; Russia | Alexis Vila; Cuba | Armen Mkrtchyan; Armenia |
| 52 kg | Valentin Yordanov; Bulgaria | Gholamreza Mohammadi; Iran | Zeke Jones; United States |
| 57 kg | Terry Brands; United States | Guivi Sissaouri; Canada | Harun Doğan; Turkey |
| 62 kg | Elbrus Tedeyev; Ukraine | Takahiro Wada; Japan | Magomed Azizov; Russia |
| 68 kg | Arayik Gevorgyan; Armenia | Akbar Fallah; Iran | Jesús Rodríguez; Cuba |
| 74 kg | Buvaisar Saitiev; Russia | Alexander Leipold; Germany | Alberto Rodríguez; Cuba |
| 82 kg | Kevin Jackson; United States | Elmadi Zhabrailov; Kazakhstan | Ruslan Khinchagov; Uzbekistan |
| 90 kg | Rasoul Khadem; Iran | Makharbek Khadartsev; Russia | Melvin Douglas; United States |
| 100 kg | Kurt Angle; United States | Arawat Sabejew; Germany | Abbas Jadidi; Iran |
| 130 kg | Bruce Baumgartner; United States | Sven Thiele; Germany | Leri Khabelov; Russia |

=== Men's Greco-Roman ===
| Event | Gold | Silver | Bronze |
|---|---|---|---|
| 48 kg | Sim Kwon-ho; South Korea | Hiroshi Kado; Japan | Zafar Guliev; Russia |
| 52 kg | Samvel Danielyan; Russia | Armen Nazaryan; Armenia | Alfred Ter-Mkrtchyan; Germany |
| 57 kg | Dennis Hall; United States | Yuriy Melnichenko; Kazakhstan | Aleksandr Ignatenko; Russia |
| 62 kg | Sergey Martynov; Russia | Włodzimierz Zawadzki; Poland | Mkhitar Manukyan; Armenia |
| 68 kg | Rustam Adzhi; Ukraine | Attila Repka; Hungary | Jannis Zamanduridis; Germany |
| 74 kg | Yvon Riemer; France | Bakhtiyar Baiseitov; Kazakhstan | Filiberto Azcuy; Cuba |
| 82 kg | Hamza Yerlikaya; Turkey | Gocha Tsitsiashvili; Israel | Thomas Zander; Germany |
| 90 kg | Hakkı Başar; Turkey | Petru Sudureac; Romania | Gogi Koguashvili; Russia |
| 100 kg | Mikael Ljungberg; Sweden | Héctor Milián; Cuba | Georgiy Saldadze; Ukraine |
| 130 kg | Aleksandr Karelin; Russia | Sergei Mureiko; Moldova | Matt Ghaffari; United States |

=== Women's freestyle ===
| Event | Gold | Silver | Bronze |
|---|---|---|---|
| 44 kg | Shoko Yoshimura; Japan | Mette Barlie; Norway | Vickie Zummo; United States |
| 47 kg | Miyu Yamamoto; Japan | Zhong Xiue; China | Elena Egoshina; Russia |
| 50 kg | Saniyat Ganachueva; Russia | Gyula Pérez; Venezuela | Yoshiko Endo; Japan |
| 53 kg | Sophie Pluquet; France | Kozue Kimura; Japan | Wendy Izaguirre; Venezuela |
| 57 kg | Sara Eriksson; Sweden | Lene Aanes; Norway | Anna Gomis; France |
| 61 kg | Nikola Hartmann; Austria | Natalia Ivanova; Russia | Kong Yan; China |
| 65 kg | Yayoi Urano; Japan | Doris Blind; France | Natalia Lazarenko; Russia |
| 70 kg | Lise Golliot; France | Elmira Kurbanova; Russia | Nina Englich; Germany |
| 75 kg | Liu Dongfeng; China | Mitsuko Funakoshi; Japan | Tetyana Komarnytskaya; Ukraine |
