= Asia DeWeese =

American freestyle wrestler

Asia DeWeese is an American former women's freestyle wrestler. She competed in and won silver in the 1989 World Wrestling Championships. This is despite losing to Jan Trussell in the first US International Freestyle Wrestling competition. She competed for the University of Oregon and currently coaches for the Umpqua Community College. During her career she lost a battle to have long hair while competing. DeWesse was among the first American women sent to compete in the World Championships.

== See also ==
- List of World Championships medalists in wrestling (women)
