= Linda Johnsen-Holmeide =

Norwegian sport wrestler

Personal information
- Nationality: Norwegian
- Born: 1 December 1972 (age 53)

Sport
- Country: Norway
- Sport: Wrestling
Medal record
Women’s freestyle wrestling
Representing Norway
World Championships
Bronze medal – third place	1992 Villeurbanne	75 kg
Bronze medal – third place	1993 Stavern	75 kg

Linda Johnsen-Holmeide (born 1 December 1972) is a Norwegian sport wrestler.

She won a bronze medal at the 1992 World Wrestling Championships in Villeurbanne, and a bronze medal at the 1993 World Wrestling Championships in Stavern.
