= Kirsten Borgen =

Norwegian sport wrestler (born 1957)

Personal information
- Born: 16 November 1957 (age 68) Kirkenes, Norway

Sport
- Country: Norway
- Sport: Wrestling
Medal record
Women’s freestyle wrestling
Representing Norway
World Championships
Silver medal – second place	1989 Martigny	75 kg
European Championships
Silver medal – second place	1988 Dijon	70 kg

Kirsten Borgen (born 16 November 1957) is a Norwegian sport wrestler. Her achievements include winning silver medals at the world championships and European championships.

== Life and career ==
Born in Kirkenes on 16 November 1957, Borgen competed in judo for several years, until she shifted to wrestling.

In 1988 she won a silver medal at the 1988 European Wrestling Championships. She won a silver medal at the 1989 World Wrestling Championships.

She became Norwegian national champion in 1989.
