= Nina Nilsen =

Norwegian sport wrestler

Personal information
- Nationality: Norwegian
- Born: 4 February 1970 (age 56) Kristiansund, Norway

Sport
- Country: Norway
- Sport: Wrestling
Medal record
Women's freestyle wrestling
Representing Norway
World Championships
| Silver medal – second place | 1989 Martigny | 65 kg |

Nina Helen Nilsen (born 4 February 1970) is a Norwegian sport wrestler. Her achievements include a silver medal at the world championships and twice national champion.

== Career ==
Nilsen became Norwegian champion in 1989 and 2000, and won silver medals in 1988, 1998, 1999 and 2001.

She won a silver medal at the 1989 World Wrestling Championships.

== Personal life ==
Nilsen was born in Kristiansund on 4 February 1970.
