= Trine Strand =

Norwegian sport wrestler

Personal information
- Nationality: Norwegian
- Born: 18 December 1972 (age 53) Kristiansund, Norway

Sport
- Country: Norway
- Sport: Wrestling
Medal record
Women’s freestyle wrestling
Representing Norway
World Championships
Silver medal – second place	1993 Stavern	44 kg
Bronze medal – third place	1989 Martigny	44 kg

Trine Beate Strand (born 18 December 1972) is a Norwegian sport wrestler.

She won a bronze medal at the 1989 World Wrestling Championships in Martigny, and a silver medal at the 1993 World Wrestling Championships in Stavern.
