= 1996 World Wrestling Championships =

- Host city: Sofia, Bulgaria
- Dates: 29–31 August 1996

Champions
- Women: Japan

The 1996 Women's World Wrestling Championships were held in Sofia, Bulgaria.

== Medal table ==
Rank	Nation	Gold	Silver	Bronze	Total
1	Japan	2	1	3	6
2	China	2	0	0	2
3	France	1	2	1	4
4	United States	1	2	0	3
5	Russia	1	1	1	3
6	Canada	1	1	0	2
7	Sweden	1	0	1	2
8	Austria	0	1	0	1
8	Bulgaria	0	1	0	1
10	Chinese Taipei	0	0	1	1
10	Germany	0	0	1	1
10	Norway	0	0	1	1
Totals (12 entries)		9	9	9	27

== Team ranking ==
Rank	Women's freestyle	
Rank	Team	Points
1	Japan	68
2	Russia	60
3	United States	48
4	France	41
5	Canada	39
6	China	32
7	Bulgaria	29
8	Chinese Taipei	29
9	Germany	25
10	Sweden	23

== Medal summary ==
Event	Gold	Silver	Bronze
44 kg	Zhong Xiue; China	Almuth Leitgeb; Austria	Shoko Yoshimura; Japan
47 kg	Tricia Saunders; United States	Angélique Hidalgo; France	Miho Adachi; Japan
50 kg	Olga Smirnova; Russia	Yoshiko Endo; Japan	Ida Hellström; Sweden
53 kg	Anna Gomis; France	Jennifer Ryz; Canada	Ryoko Sakae; Japan
57 kg	Sara Eriksson; Sweden	Jackie Berube; United States	Lene Aanes; Norway
61 kg	Mikiko Miyazaki; Japan	Natalia Ivanova; Russia	Stéphanie Groß; Germany
65 kg	Yayoi Urano; Japan	Doris Blind; France	Elmira Kurbanova; Russia
70 kg	Christine Nordhagen; Canada	Galina Ivanova; Bulgaria	Lise Golliot; France
75 kg	Liu Dongfeng; China	Kristie Stenglein; United States	Sha Ling-li; Chinese Taipei

== Participating nations ==
105 competitors from 20 nations participated.

- Australia (3)
- Austria (3)
- Azerbaijan (2)
- Bulgaria (9)
- Canada (9)
- China (4)
- Chinese Taipei (9)
- Czech Republic (1)
- Denmark (1)
- France (7)
- Germany (4)
- Greece (2)
- Italy (4)
- Japan (9)
- Norway (5)
- Poland (6)
- Russia (9)
- Sweden (5)
- Ukraine (5)
- United States (8)

== See also ==
- Wrestling at the 1996 Summer Olympics
