= Lotte Søvre =

Norwegian sport wrestler

Personal information
- Nationality: Norwegian
- Born: 8 January 1972 (age 54)

Sport
- Country: Norway
- Sport: Wrestling
- Club: Lørenskog BK
Medal record
Women's freestyle wrestling
Representing Norway
World Championships
Bronze medal – third place	1989 Martigny	53 kg
Bronze medal – third place	1990 Luleå	53 kg

Lotte Beate Søvre (born 8 January 1972) is a Norwegian sport wrestler. Her achievements include two bronze medals at the world championships and three times national champion.

== Career ==
Søvre became Norwegian champion in 1987 and 1991 and 1992.

She won a bronze medal at the 1989 World Wrestling Championships in Martigny, and a bronze medal at the 1990 World Wrestling Championships in Luleå.

== Personal life ==
Søvre was born on 8 January 1972. She grew up in Lørenskog and represented the club Lørenskog BK.
