= 1993 World Wrestling Championships =

Freestyle
- Host city: Toronto, Canada
- Dates: 25–28 August 1993
- Stadium: University of Toronto

Greco-Roman
- Host city: Stockholm, Sweden
- Dates: 16–19 September 1993

Women
- Host city: Stavern, Norway
- Dates: 7–8 August 1993

Champions
- Freestyle: United States
- Greco-Roman: Russia
- Women: Japan

The following is the final results of the 1993 World Wrestling Championships. Men's freestyle competition were held in Toronto, Ontario, Canada. Men's Greco-Roman competition were held in Stockholm, Sweden and Women's competition were held in Stavern, Norway.

== Medal table ==
Rank	Nation	Gold	Silver	Bronze	Total
1	Russia	5	6	6	17
2	United States	4	3	0	7
3	Cuba	4	1	2	7
4	China	3	0	0	3
5	Japan	2	2	1	5
6	Norway	2	1	2	5
7	Turkey	2	1	0	3
8	France	1	1	2	4
8	South Korea	1	1	2	4
10	Armenia	1	1	0	2
10	Iran	1	1	0	2
12	Sweden	1	0	1	2
13	Austria	1	0	0	1
13	Bulgaria	1	0	0	1
15	Belarus	0	2	0	2
16	Canada	0	1	2	3
16	Germany	0	1	2	3
18	Georgia	0	1	1	2
18	Poland	0	1	1	2
18	Venezuela	0	1	1	2
21	Kazakhstan	0	1	0	1
21	Moldova	0	1	0	1
21	Romania	0	1	0	1
21	Ukraine	0	1	0	1
25	Chinese Taipei	0	0	2	2
25	Uzbekistan	0	0	2	2
27	Finland	0	0	1	1
27	Mongolia	0	0	1	1
Totals (28 entries)		29	29	29	87

== Team ranking ==
Rank	Men's freestyle		Men's Greco-Roman		Women's freestyle	
Rank	Team	Points	Team	Points	Team	Points
1	United States	76	Russia	75	Japan	66
2	Russia	54	Cuba	51	Norway	65
3	Turkey	52	Sweden	43	Russia	50
4	South Korea	41				
5	Cuba	38				
6	Ukraine	30				
7	Iran	27				
8	Germany	27				
9	Georgia	21				
10	Uzbekistan	21				

== Medal summary ==
=== Men's freestyle ===
Event	Gold	Silver	Bronze
48 kg	Alexis Vila; Cuba	Vugar Orujov; Belarus	Jung Soon-won; South Korea
52 kg	Valentin Yordanov; Bulgaria	Gholamreza Mohammadi; Iran	Sergey Zambalov; Russia
57 kg	Terry Brands; United States	Shim Sang-hyo; South Korea	Tserenbaataryn Tsogtbayar; Mongolia
62 kg	Tom Brands; United States	Lázaro Reinoso; Cuba	Ramil Ataulin; Uzbekistan
68 kg	Akbar Fallah; Iran	Vadim Bogiev; Russia	Chris Wilson; Canada
74 kg	Park Jang-soon; South Korea	Dave Schultz; United States	Alberto Rodríguez; Cuba
82 kg	Sebahattin Öztürk; Turkey	Sagid Katinovasov; Russia	Ruslan Khinchagov; Uzbekistan
90 kg	Melvin Douglas; United States	Eldar Kurtanidze; Georgia	Makharbek Khadartsev; Russia
100 kg	Leri Khabelov; Russia	Ali Kayalı; Turkey	Heiko Balz; Germany
130 kg	Bruce Baumgartner; United States	Mirabi Valiyev; Ukraine	Andrey Shumilin; Russia

=== Men's Greco-Roman ===
Event	Gold	Silver	Bronze
48 kg	Wilber Sánchez; Cuba	Zafar Guliev; Russia	Sim Kwon-ho; South Korea
52 kg	Raúl Martínez; Cuba	Armen Nazaryan; Armenia	Alfred Ter-Mkrtchyan; Germany
57 kg	Aghasi Manukyan; Armenia	Aleksandr Ignatenko; Russia	Mikael Lindgren; Finland
62 kg	Sergey Martynov; Russia	Ender Memet; Romania	Juan Marén; Cuba
68 kg	Islam Dugushiev; Russia	Kamandar Madzhidov; Belarus	Ghani Yalouz; France
74 kg	Néstor Almanza; Cuba	Józef Tracz; Poland	Yvon Riemer; France
82 kg	Hamza Yerlikaya; Turkey	Daulet Turlykhanov; Kazakhstan	Murat Kardanov; Russia
90 kg	Gogi Koguashvili; Russia	Maik Bullmann; Germany	Tengiz Tedoradze; Georgia
100 kg	Mikael Ljungberg; Sweden	Ibragim Shovkhalov; Russia	Andrzej Wroński; Poland
130 kg	Aleksandr Karelin; Russia	Sergei Mureiko; Moldova	Tomas Johansson; Sweden

=== Women's freestyle ===
Event	Gold	Silver	Bronze
44 kg	Shoko Yoshimura; Japan	Trine Strand; Norway	Tatiana Karamchakova; Russia
47 kg	Zhong Xiue; China	Tricia Saunders; United States	Tetey Alibekova; Russia
50 kg	Anna Gomis; France	Shannon Williams; United States	Yoshiko Endo; Japan
53 kg	Line Johansen; Norway	Akemi Kawasaki; Japan	Wendy Izaguirre; Venezuela
57 kg	Gudrun Høie; Norway	Olga Lugo; Venezuela	Huang Ai-chun; Chinese Taipei
61 kg	Nikola Hartmann; Austria	Isabelle Dourthe; France	Lene Barlie; Norway
65 kg	Wang Chaoli; China	Elmira Kurbanova; Russia	Janna Penny; Canada
70 kg	Yayoi Urano; Japan	Christine Nordhagen; Canada	Chen Chin-ping; Chinese Taipei
75 kg	Liu Dongfeng; China	Mikiko Miyazaki; Japan	Linda Johnsen-Holmeide; Norway
