= Leia Kawaii =

Former US female wrestler

Leia Kawaii is a former US Women's wrestler. She competed in the 1989 and 1991 World Freestyle Wrestling Championship. She earned a silver medal in 1989. She later became a professional wrestler as well as a body builder. She competed at 70 kg and later 75 kg.

== See also ==
List of World Championships medalists in wrestling (women)
