= Gudrun Høie =

Norwegian sport wrestler

Personal information
- Born: 13 July 1970 (age 56) Kristiansund, Norway

Sport
- Sport: Wrestling
Medal record
Women's freestyle wrestling
Representing Norway
World Championships
Gold medal – first place	1989	57 kg
Gold medal – first place	1990	57 kg
Gold medal – first place	1993	57 kg
Gold medal – first place	1998	57 kg
Silver medal – second place	1991	57 kg
Bronze medal – third place	1999	57 kg

Gudrun Anette Høie (born 13 July 1970) is a Norwegian sport wrestler from Kristiansund.

She won a gold medal in the FILA Wrestling World Championships in 1989, 1990, 1993 and 1998, a silver medal in 1991, and bronze in 1999. She was European champion in sumo wrestling in 1998. She has won the National Championships nine times.

She became known in Norway, when she, as the first in Norway, was suspended from her sport for not having revealed her whereabouts to the national anti-doping agency. The suspension lasted from April to November 2007, and destroyed her form for the 2008 Summer Olympics.

She stands 1.57 m (5 ft 2 in) tall. Outside of sport, she works as a physician in Kristiansund. She represented the club Kristiansund AK.
