= Anne Holten =

Norwegian sport wrestler

Personal information
- Born: 31 January 1972 (age 54)

Sport
- Sport: Wrestling
Medal record
Women's freestyle wrestling
Representing Norway
World Championships
Gold medal – first place	1987 Lørenskog	47 kg
Gold medal – first place	1989 Martigny	50 kg

Anne Katrine Holten (born 31 January 1972) is a Norwegian sport wrestler who won World Wrestling Championships titles in 1987 and 1989.

== Life and career ==
Holten was born on 31 January 1972.

She won gold medals at the 1987 World Wrestling Championships and the 1989 World Wrestling Championships. She represented the club Kristiansund AK.

She won national titles three times.
