= Christine Nordhagen =

Canadian wrestler (born 1971)

Personal information
- Born: June 26, 1971 (age 55) Valhalla, Alberta, Canada

Sport
- Country: Canada
- Sport: Wrestling
- Event: Freestyle
Medal record
Women's freestyle wrestling
Representing Canada
World Championships
Gold medal – first place	1994 Sofia	70 kg
Gold medal – first place	1996 Sofia	70 kg
Gold medal – first place	1997 Clermont-Ferrand	68 kg
Gold medal – first place	1998 Poznań	68 kg
Gold medal – first place	2000 Sofia	75 kg
Gold medal – first place	2001 Sofia	68 kg
Silver medal – second place	1993 Stavern	70 kg
Bronze medal – third place	1999 Boden	75 kg
Pan American Championships
Gold medal – first place	1997 San Juan	68 kg
Gold medal – first place	1998 Winnipeg	75 kg

Christine Nordhagen (born June 26, 1971) is a former Canadian wrestler.

== Wrestling ==
Nordhagen, who began wrestling at age 20, is a graduate of the University of Alberta. She has won six world championship gold medals: 1994, 1996, 2000 and 2001 in Sofia, Bulgaria (70 kg freestyle for 1994 and 1996, 75 kg for 2000 and 68 kg for 2001), 1997 in Clermont-Ferrand, France, and 1998 in Poznań, Poland (both 68 kg). She won a silver medal in 1993 in Stavern, Norway and a bronze medal in 1999 in Boden, Sweden (both 70 kg). At the 2004 Summer Olympics in Athens she placed 5th in the 72 kg women's freestyle. She retired from competition a year after the Athens Games.

Nordhagen first started winning titles at Canada’s first national championship in 1992. When she began competing at world championships in 1993, there were fewer than 150 Canadian women registered in wrestling. By the time she retired, there were more than 4,000 women, not counting non-registered girls at the high-school level, registered in wrestling, according to Greg Mathieu, executive director of the Canadian Amateur Wrestling Association.

Nordhagen helped get the women’s side of the sport into the Olympics for the first time at Athens in 2004, where she finished fifth.

== Upbringing and motivation ==
Nordhagen says she never ran well using hate as emotional fuel, as some athletes do. Her modus operandi involved a smile of confidence and the work ethic of a girl raised on a farm where the labours did not have genders.

"In a farm family, there’s a different perspective," she said. "I had a mother who did everything my father did, because on a grain and cattle farm, things have to get done. . . . There were some gender stereotypes -- she cooked more than my father did -- but she also fixed machines, carried loads. It wasn't an option for me to say I can't do things because I'm female."

== Coaching ==
Nordhagen and former world champion track cyclist Tanya Dubnicoff were among several retiring female athletes who were drafted into a special training program by the Coaching Association of Canada to help retain and pass on expertise to a new generation. In 2006, besides maintaining a busy schedule as a motivational speaker and role model for students (under the sponsorship of Alberta oil and gas companies), Nordhagen began coaching Canadian junior women.

== Hall of Fame ==
On June 26, 2006, Nordhagen’s husband and longtime coach, Leigh Vierling, received a phone call to inform Christine that she had been voted into the class of 2006 inductees to the international wrestling hall of fame. She became the first Canadian and first woman to be named to the hall by the Federation Internationale de Luttes Associees (FILA), wrestling's international and Olympic governing body. The ceremony was scheduled to take place during the world wrestling championships September 23 to October 2 at Guangzhou, China. The permanent display of honorees is housed at the Wrestling Hall of Fame and Museum in Stillwater, Oklahoma. Nordhagen was inducted into the Alberta Sports Hall of Fame & Museum in May 2010 for her achievements in Wrestling.

Nordhagen is one of nine wrestlers inducted for 2006, a class representing 30 individual world titles and eight Olympic gold medals.
