= Shoko Yoshimura =

Japanese freestyle wrestler

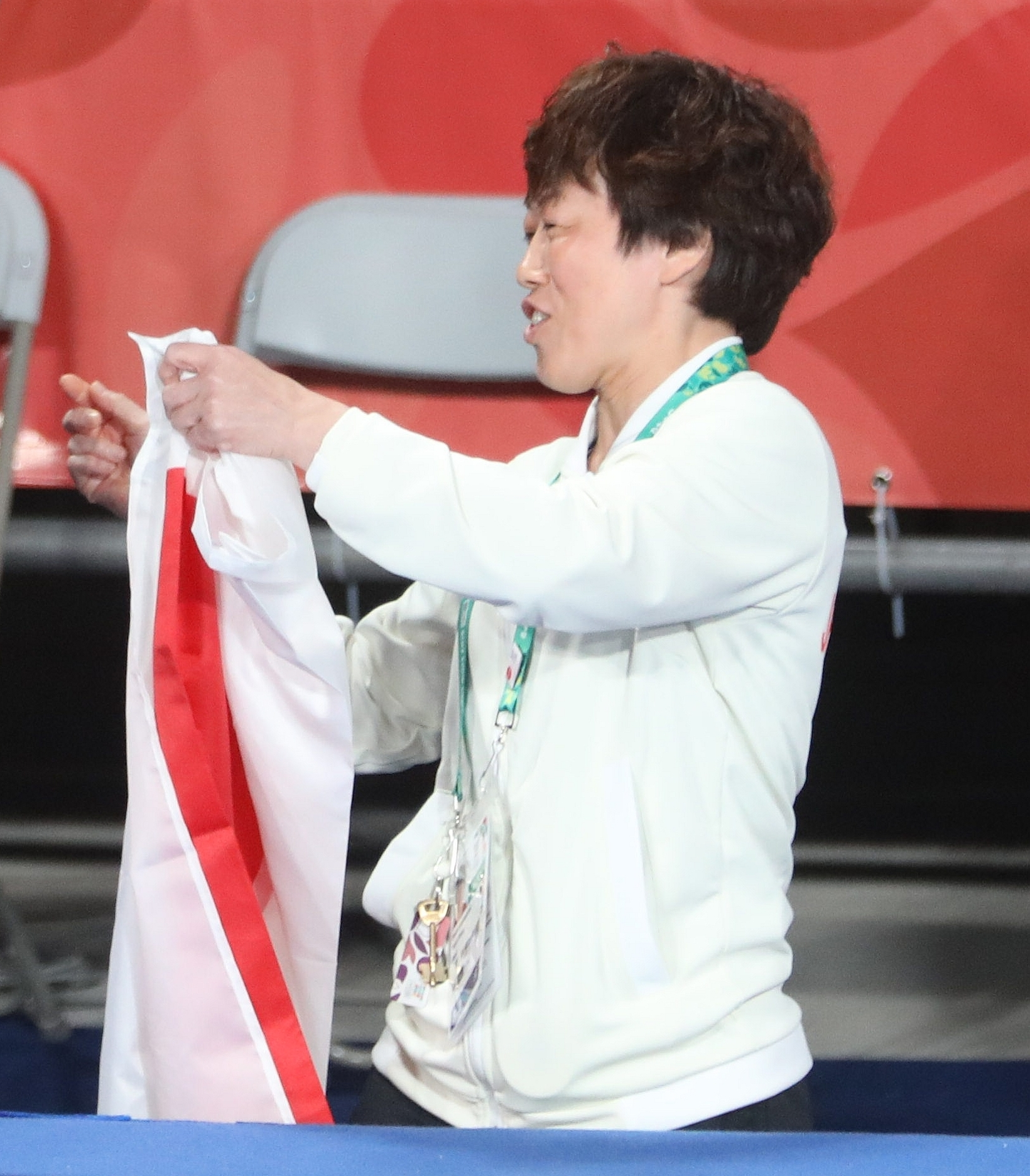
- Shoko Yoshimura at 2018 Summer Youth Olympics

Personal information
- Native name: 吉村 祥子
- Born: 14 October 1968 (age 57) Kanagawa Prefecture, Japan
- Height: 153 cm (5 ft 0 in)

Sport
- Country: Japan
- Sport: Wrestling
- Event: Freestyle
Medal record
Women's freestyle wrestling
Representing Japan
World Championships
Gold medal – first place	1989 Martigny	44 kg
Gold medal – first place	1990 Ostia	44 kg
Gold medal – first place	1993 Stavern	44 kg
Gold medal – first place	1994 Sofia	44 kg
Gold medal – first place	1995 Moscow	44 kg
Silver medal – second place	1992 Villeurbanne	44 kg
Bronze medal – third place	1987 Lørenskog	44 kg
Bronze medal – third place	1991 Tokyo	44 kg
Bronze medal – third place	1996 Sofia	44 kg
Asian Championships
Gold medal – first place	1996 Xiaoshan	44 kg
Gold medal – first place	1997 Taipei	46 kg
Gold medal – first place	2000 Seoul	46 kg

Shoko Yoshimura (吉村 祥子, Yoshimura Shoko; born 14 October 1968) is a retired Japanese Wrestler. She competed in 10 World Wrestling Championships and won 9 medals, including 5 gold medals.

== Biography ==
Yoshimura aspired to be a professional wrestler when she was at Seijo Gakuen High School because she admired the Crush Gals (Chigusa Nagayo and Lioness Asuka). In 1986, She auditioned for Professional Wrestling, but was turned away because she was too short at 153 cm. At that time, she was invited by former world champion Tomiaki Fukuda, which led her to start Amateur Wrestling instead of professional wrestling. In 1987, she entered Seijo University. That year, she competed and placed third at the first Women's World Championships in Oslo, Norway, in the 44kg weight class. She won the 1989 World Wrestling Championships for the first time, followed by the 1990 World Wrestling Championships. She also won three consecutive World Championships from 1993 to 1995. She then had a period of time away from wrestling due to a knee injury, but continued to wrestle until 2004. In 2009, she was inducted into the UWW (then FILA) Hall of Fame and has coached the Japanese women's national team since then. Among others, she has personally coached Yui Susaki since she was 13 years old, who won the gold medal in the 50kg weight class at the Tokyo Olympics.
