= Angélique Berthenet =

French freestyle wrestler

Personal information
- Full name: Angélique Berthenet-Hidalgo
- Nationality: France
- Born: 18 September 1976 (age 49) Melun, France
- Height: 1.57 m (5 ft 2 in)
- Weight: 48 kg (106 lb)

Sport
- Style: Freestyle
- Club: ESL Dammarie
- Coach: Ryszard Chelmowski
Medal record
Women's freestyle wrestling
Representing France
World Championships
Silver medal – second place	1996 Sofia	47 kg
European Championships
Gold medal – first place	1996 Oslo	47 kg
Bronze medal – third place	1997 Warsaw	47 kg
Bronze medal – third place	1998 Bratislava	51 kg
Bronze medal – third place	2002 Seinäjoki	48 kg
Bronze medal – third place	2003 Riga	48 kg

Angélique Berthenet-Hidalgo (born September 18, 1976) is a French retired amateur freestyle wrestler, who competed in the women's flyweight category. Considering one of the world's top female freestyle wrestlers in her decade, Berthenet has claimed a silver medal in the 47-kg division at the 1996 World Wrestling Championships in Sofia, Bulgaria, produced a staggering tally of five medals (one gold and four bronze) at the European Championships, and offered a chance to represent her country France at the 2004 Summer Olympics. Throughout her sporting career, Berthenet trained full-time for Dammarie Sport Wrestling Club (French: l'Entente Sportive de Lutte), under her personal coach Ryszard Chelmowski.

Berthenet made sporting headlines at the 1996 World Wrestling Championships in Sofia, Bulgaria, where she won a silver medal in the women's 47-kg division, losing to the U.S. wrestler Tricia Saunders. In the same year, she won her first European championship title in the same category, and continued to produce four more medals (1997, 1998, 2002, and 2003) in her career. Eventually, she entered the 2003 World Wrestling Championships in New York City, United States, and came strong as a top medal contender in her category. Though she finished sixth in the women's flyweight, Berthenet qualified for her first Olympics and was officially selected to the French Olympic team.

When women's wrestling made its debut at the 2004 Summer Olympics in Athens, Berthenet seized her opportunity to compete in the inaugural 48 kg class. In the prelim pool, Berthenet opened her match by dismantling Mongolia's Tsogtbazaryn Enkhjargal with a 7–4 decision, and then easily pinned Guinea-Bissau's Leopoldina Ross within the first minute to secure a place in the semifinals. She lost the next day's semifinal match 12–0 in superb fashion to Japan's Chiharu Icho, and could not hold an early lead to throw the U.S. wrestler Patricia Miranda off the mat with a tough, 4–12 decision for the bronze medal, dropping her position to fourth.
