= 1999 World Wrestling Championships =

Freestyle
- Host city: Ankara, Turkey
- Dates: 7–10 October 1999
- Stadium: Atatürk Sport Hall

Greco-Roman
- Host city: Piraeus, Greece
- Dates: 23–26 September 1999
- Stadium: Peace and Friendship Stadium

Women
- Host city: Boden, Sweden
- Dates: 10–12 September 1999
- Stadium: Hildursborg

Champions
- Freestyle: Russia
- Greco-Roman: Russia
- Women: United States

The following is the final results of the 1999 World Wrestling Championships. Men's Freestyle competition were held in Ankara, Turkey. Men's Greco-Roman competition were held in Piraeus, Greece and Women's competition were held in Boden, Sweden.

== Medal table ==
Rank	Nation	Gold	Silver	Bronze	Total
1	Russia	4	3	2	9
2	United States	3	2	1	6
3	South Korea	3	2	0	5
4	Cuba	3	1	0	4
4	Japan	3	1	0	4
6	Turkey	2	1	2	5
7	Canada	1	1	1	3
8	France	1	1	0	2
8	Kazakhstan	1	1	0	2
10	Ukraine	1	0	1	2
11	Germany	0	3	1	4
12	China	0	2	1	3
12	Iran	0	2	1	3
14	Uzbekistan	0	1	2	3
15	Poland	0	1	1	2
16	Bulgaria	0	0	2	2
16	Sweden	0	0	2	2
18	Belarus	0	0	1	1
18	Greece	0	0	1	1
18	Israel	0	0	1	1
18	Kyrgyzstan	0	0	1	1
18	Norway	0	0	1	1
Totals (22 entries)		22	22	22	66

== Team ranking ==
Rank	Men's freestyle		Men's Greco-Roman		Women's freestyle	
Rank	Team	Points	Team	Points	Team	Points
1	Russia	48	Russia	40	United States	47
2	United States	45	Cuba	38	Japan	46
3	Turkey	45	South Korea	32	China	29.5
4	Iran	34	Kazakhstan	26	Russia	29
5	Uzbekistan	30	Turkey	26	Canada	24
6	South Korea	28	Belarus	25	Venezuela	22
7	Ukraine	24	Hungary	22	Ukraine	20.5
8	Cuba	20	Germany	19	Norway	20
9	Bulgaria	18	Sweden	18	Sweden	20
10	Germany	17	Bulgaria	16	France	17

== Medal summary ==
=== Men's freestyle ===
Event	Gold	Silver	Bronze
54 kg	Kim Woo-yong; South Korea	Adkhamjon Achilov; Uzbekistan	Oleksandr Zakharuk; Ukraine
58 kg	Harun Doğan; Turkey	Alireza Dabir; Iran	Damir Zakhartdinov; Uzbekistan
63 kg	Elbrus Tedeyev; Ukraine	Jang Jae-sung; South Korea	Ramil Islamov; Uzbekistan
69 kg	Daniel Igali; Canada	Lincoln McIlravy; United States	Yüksel Şanlı; Turkey
76 kg	Adam Saitiev; Russia	Alexander Leipold; Germany	Adem Bereket; Turkey
85 kg	Yoel Romero; Cuba	Khadzhimurad Magomedov; Russia	Les Gutches; United States
97 kg	Sagid Murtazaliev; Russia	Alireza Heidari; Iran	Marek Garmulewicz; Poland
130 kg	Stephen Neal; United States	Andrey Shumilin; Russia	Abbas Jadidi; Iran

=== Men's Greco-Roman ===
Event	Gold	Silver	Bronze
54 kg	Lázaro Rivas; Cuba	Ha Tae-yeon; South Korea	Alfred Ter-Mkrtchyan; Germany
58 kg	Kim In-sub; South Korea	Yuriy Melnichenko; Kazakhstan	Armen Nazaryan; Bulgaria
63 kg	Mkhitar Manukyan; Kazakhstan	Şeref Eroğlu; Turkey	Michael Beilin; Israel
69 kg	Son Sang-pil; South Korea	Aleksandr Tretyakov; Russia	Vladimir Kopytov; Belarus
76 kg	Nazmi Avluca; Turkey	Yvon Riemer; France	Dimitrios Avramis; Greece
85 kg	Luis Enrique Méndez; Cuba	Thomas Zander; Germany	Raatbek Sanatbayev; Kyrgyzstan
97 kg	Gogi Koguashvili; Russia	Andrzej Wroński; Poland	Mikael Ljungberg; Sweden
130 kg	Aleksandr Karelin; Russia	Héctor Milián; Cuba	Sergei Mureiko; Bulgaria

=== Women's freestyle ===
Event	Gold	Silver	Bronze
46 kg	Tricia Saunders; United States	Zhong Xiue; China	Inga Karamchakova; Russia
51 kg	Seiko Yamamoto; Japan	Erica Sharp; Canada	Gao Yanzhi; China
56 kg	Anna Gomis; France	Mariko Shimizu; Japan	Gudrun Høie; Norway
62 kg	Ayako Shoda; Japan	Meng Lili; China	Lotta Andersson; Sweden
68 kg	Sandra Bacher; United States	Anita Schätzle; Germany	Anna Shamova; Russia
75 kg	Kyoko Hamaguchi; Japan	Kristie Marano; United States	Christine Nordhagen; Canada

== Participating nations ==
=== Men's freestyle ===
271 competitors from 53 nations participated.

- Albania (1)
- Algeria (1)
- Armenia (5)
- Australia (5)
- Austria (2)
- Azerbaijan (8)
- Belarus (6)
- Bulgaria (8)
- Cameroon (1)
- Canada (7)
- China (8)
- Chinese Taipei (2)
- Cuba (8)
- Cyprus (3)
- Czech Republic (3)
- Estonia (2)
- Finland (3)
- France (5)
- Georgia (8)
- Germany (8)
- Great Britain (6)
- Greece (8)
- Hungary (8)
- India (4)
- Iran (8)
- Italy (3)
- Ivory Coast (1)
- Japan (8)
- Kazakhstan (6)
- Kyrgyzstan (7)
- Latvia (2)
- Lithuania (2)
- Macedonia (6)
- Mexico (1)
- Moldova (5)
- Mongolia (8)
- Netherlands (4)
- North Korea (2)
- Poland (8)
- Puerto Rico (2)
- Romania (7)
- Russia (8)
- Slovakia (7)
- South Africa (3)
- South Korea (8)
- Spain (3)
- Switzerland (4)
- Syria (3)
- Turkey (8)
- Ukraine (8)
- United States (8)
- Uzbekistan (8)
- Venezuela (3)

=== Men's Greco-Roman ===
280 competitors from 56 nations participated.

- Armenia (8)
- Australia (3)
- Austria (3)
- Azerbaijan (7)
- Belarus (8)
- Bosnia and Herzegovina (1)
- Bulgaria (8)
- China (8)
- Chinese Taipei (3)
- Croatia (2)
- Cuba (8)
- Cyprus (1)
- Czech Republic (6)
- Denmark (2)
- Estonia (4)
- Finland (6)
- France (6)
- Georgia (8)
- Germany (8)
- Greece (8)
- Guam (1)
- Hungary (8)
- Iran (8)
- Israel (5)
- Italy (4)
- Japan (8)
- Kazakhstan (6)
- Kyrgyzstan (6)
- Latvia (2)
- Lithuania (4)
- Macedonia (1)
- Mexico (3)
- Moldova (5)
- Netherlands (3)
- North Korea (3)
- Norway (4)
- Philippines (1)
- Poland (8)
- Portugal (2)
- Romania (7)
- Russia (8)
- Slovakia (2)
- South Africa (3)
- South Korea (8)
- Spain (3)
- Sweden (8)
- Switzerland (4)
- Syria (2)
- Turkey (8)
- Turkmenistan (4)
- Ukraine (8)
- United States (8)
- Uzbekistan (6)
- Venezuela (5)
- Yemen (1)
- Yugoslavia (5)

=== Women's freestyle ===
84 competitors from 21 nations participated.

- Australia (2)
- Austria (3)
- Brazil (1)
- Bulgaria (2)
- Canada (6)
- China (4)
- Finland (1)
- France (5)
- Germany (4)
- Greece (2)
- Italy (4)
- Japan (6)
- Kyrgyzstan (1)
- Latvia (3)
- Norway (5)
- Poland (5)
- Russia (6)
- Sweden (6)
- Ukraine (6)
- United States (6)
- Venezuela (6)
