= 1998 World Wrestling Championships =

Freestyle
- Host city: Tehran, Iran
- Dates: 8–11 September 1998
- Stadium: Azadi Indoor Stadium

Greco-Roman
- Host city: Gävle, Sweden
- Dates: 27–30 August 1998
- Stadium: Gavlerinken

Women
- Host city: Poznań, Poland
- Dates: 8–10 October 1998
- Stadium: Hala Arena

Champions
- Freestyle: Iran
- Greco-Roman: Russia
- Women: Russia

The following is the final results of the 1998 World Wrestling Championships. Men's Freestyle competition were held in Tehran, Iran. Men's Greco-Roman competition were held in Gävle, Sweden and Women's competition were held in Poznań, Poland.

== Medal table ==
Rank	Nation	Gold	Silver	Bronze	Total
1	Russia	5	0	5	10
2	Iran	3	2	1	6
3	United States	2	2	3	7
4	South Korea	2	1	2	5
5	Japan	2	1	0	3
6	Kazakhstan	2	0	0	2
7	Cuba	1	1	1	3
8	Norway	1	1	0	2
9	Bulgaria	1	0	1	2
9	Canada	1	0	1	2
11	Armenia	1	0	0	1
11	Austria	1	0	0	1
13	Turkey	0	2	1	3
14	Hungary	0	2	0	2
15	Sweden	0	1	2	3
16	Germany	0	1	1	2
16	Poland	0	1	1	2
16	Ukraine	0	1	1	2
19	Azerbaijan	0	1	0	1
19	China	0	1	0	1
19	Czech Republic	0	1	0	1
19	France	0	1	0	1
19	Macedonia	0	1	0	1
19	Romania	0	1	0	1
25	Israel	0	0	1	1
25	Syria	0	0	1	1
Totals (26 entries)		22	22	22	66

== Team ranking ==
Rank	Men's freestyle		Men's Greco-Roman		Women's freestyle	
Rank	Team	Points	Team	Points	Team	Points
1	Iran	63	Russia	66	Russia	44
2	Russia	54	South Korea	36	Japan	38
3	United States	43	Turkey	34	United States	34
4	Ukraine	37	Kazakhstan	27	Canada	29
5	South Korea	28	Hungary	26	Norway	25
6	Poland	22	Bulgaria	26	Germany	23
7	Cuba	18	Romania	22	Ukraine	23
8	Germany	18	Cuba	19	Poland	22
9	Armenia	15	Ukraine	19	Sweden	21
10	Turkey	15	Poland	18	Austria	20

== Medal summary ==
=== Men's freestyle ===
Event	Gold	Silver	Bronze
54 kg	Sammie Henson; United States	Namig Abdullayev; Azerbaijan	Gholamreza Mohammadi; Iran
58 kg	Alireza Dabir; Iran	Harun Doğan; Turkey	Guivi Sissaouri; Canada
63 kg	Serafim Barzakov; Bulgaria	Abbas Hajkenari; Iran	Cary Kolat; United States
69 kg	Arayik Gevorgyan; Armenia	Zaza Zazirov; Ukraine	Lincoln McIlravy; United States
76 kg	Buvaisar Saitiev; Russia	Moon Eui-jae; South Korea	Alexander Leipold; Germany
85 kg	Alireza Heidari; Iran	Magomed Ibragimov; Macedonia	Yoel Romero; Cuba
97 kg	Abbas Jadidi; Iran	Marek Garmulewicz; Poland	Kuramagomed Kuramagomedov; Russia
130 kg	Alexis Rodríguez; Cuba	Rasoul Khadem; Iran	Andrey Shumilin; Russia

=== Men's Greco-Roman ===
Event	Gold	Silver	Bronze
54 kg	Sim Kwon-ho; South Korea	Marian Sandu; Romania	Khaled Al-Faraj; Syria
58 kg	Kim In-sub; South Korea	Sheng Zetian; China	Armen Nazaryan; Bulgaria
63 kg	Mkhitar Manukyan; Kazakhstan	Şeref Eroğlu; Turkey	Choi Sang-sun; South Korea
69 kg	Aleksandr Tretyakov; Russia	Csaba Hirbik; Hungary	Son Sang-pil; South Korea
76 kg	Bakhtiyar Baiseitov; Kazakhstan	Filiberto Azcuy; Cuba	Nazmi Avluca; Turkey
85 kg	Aleksandr Menshchikov; Russia	János Kismoni; Hungary	Martin Lidberg; Sweden
97 kg	Gogi Koguashvili; Russia	Marek Švec; Czech Republic	Davyd Saldadze; Ukraine
130 kg	Aleksandr Karelin; Russia	Matt Ghaffari; United States	Yuri Evseichik; Israel

=== Women's freestyle ===
Event	Gold	Silver	Bronze
46 kg	Tricia Saunders; United States	Miyu Yamamoto; Japan	Inga Karamchakova; Russia
51 kg	Atsuko Shinomura; Japan	Ida Hellström; Sweden	Elena Egoshina; Russia
56 kg	Gudrun Høie; Norway	Anna Gomis; France	Sara Eriksson; Sweden
62 kg	Nikola Hartmann; Austria	Lene Aanes; Norway	Natalia Vinogradova; Russia
68 kg	Christine Nordhagen; Canada	Stéphanie Groß; Germany	Sandra Bacher; United States
75 kg	Kyoko Hamaguchi; Japan	Kristie Stenglein; United States	Edyta Witkowska; Poland

== Participating nations ==
=== Men's freestyle ===
204 competitors from 40 nations participated.

- Armenia (2)
- Australia (5)
- Azerbaijan (7)
- Belarus (8)
- Bulgaria (8)
- Canada (8)
- China (6)
- Chinese Taipei (1)
- Colombia (3)
- Cuba (3)
- Cyprus (2)
- Czech Republic (2)
- France (1)
- Georgia (7)
- Germany (8)
- Great Britain (2)
- Greece (4)
- Hungary (4)
- India (7)
- Iran (8)
- Italy (1)
- Japan (8)
- Kazakhstan (7)
- Kyrgyzstan (5)
- Latvia (1)
- Macedonia (1)
- Moldova (4)
- Mongolia (8)
- Poland (8)
- Romania (3)
- Russia (8)
- Slovakia (2)
- South Africa (5)
- South Korea (8)
- Switzerland (4)
- Syria (4)
- Turkey (8)
- Ukraine (8)
- United States (8)
- Uzbekistan (7)

=== Men's Greco-Roman ===
220 competitors from 49 nations participated.

- Algeria (1)
- Armenia (5)
- Australia (1)
- Austria (1)
- Belarus (7)
- Bulgaria (7)
- Canada (2)
- China (7)
- Colombia (2)
- Croatia (1)
- Cuba (3)
- Czech Republic (2)
- Denmark (1)
- Estonia (6)
- Finland (7)
- France (5)
- Georgia (7)
- Germany (8)
- Greece (7)
- Guam (1)
- Hungary (8)
- Iran (6)
- Israel (5)
- Italy (6)
- Japan (8)
- Kazakhstan (5)
- Kyrgyzstan (2)
- Latvia (3)
- Lithuania (3)
- Moldova (2)
- Netherlands (2)
- Norway (5)
- Poland (8)
- Portugal (2)
- Romania (5)
- Russia (8)
- Slovakia (2)
- Slovenia (3)
- South Korea (8)
- Spain (3)
- Sweden (8)
- Switzerland (1)
- Syria (3)
- Tunisia (2)
- Turkey (8)
- Ukraine (8)
- United States (8)
- Uzbekistan (4)
- Yugoslavia (3)

=== Women's freestyle ===
86 competitors from 21 nations participated.

- Australia (4)
- Austria (4)
- Bulgaria (2)
- Canada (6)
- China (4)
- Czech Republic (2)
- France (4)
- Germany (5)
- Greece (2)
- Italy (4)
- Japan (6)
- Latvia (3)
- Norway (4)
- Poland (6)
- Russia (6)
- Spain (3)
- Sweden (4)
- Switzerland (1)
- Ukraine (5)
- United States (6)
- Uzbekistan (5)
