= Tricia Saunders =

American freestyle wrestler (born 1966)

Personal information
- Born: February 21, 1966 (age 60) Ann Arbor, Michigan, U.S.

Sport
- Country: United States
- Sport: Wrestling
- Event: Freestyle
Medal record
Women's freestyle wrestling
Representing the United States
World Championships
Gold medal – first place	1992 Villeurbanne	50 kg
Gold medal – first place	1996 Sofia	47 kg
Gold medal – first place	1998 Poznań	46 kg
Gold medal – first place	1999 Boden	46 kg
Silver medal – second place	1993 Stavern	47 kg

Tricia Saunders (born as Patricia McNaughton; February 21, 1966) is an American amateur wrestler and pioneer the sport of women's freestyle wrestling. During her freestyle wrestling career, she won five FILA Wrestling World Championships medals, including four gold and one silver, never lost to an American opponent, and won eleven U.S. national titles.

Saunders was the first woman to be inducted to the National Wrestling Hall of Fame as a Distinguished Member in Stillwater, Oklahoma and the first American woman to be inducted into FILA's International Wrestling Hall of Fame in Istanbul, Turkey.

== Early life and education ==
Saunders was born in Ann Arbor, Michigan, on February 21, 1966. Her grandfather was an All-American collegiate wrestler at the University of Michigan in 1930; both her father and older brother, Jamie, were also wrestlers.

As a child, she accompanied her brothers to wrestling practice. At age seven, Saunders said she wanted to compete in the sport. In her first tournament, at nine years old, she won seven of her nine matches, all against boys. By the time she reached the Regional Nationals, she was a force to be reckoned with in the 50-pound weight class.

In 1975, Saunders appeared as a featured guest on an episode of To Tell the Truth, a syndicated television show.

At age 12, she stopped wrestling against boys in folkstyle wrestling, after compiling a career youth record of 181-23. As a girl, she was ineligible from participating on her boys high school wrestling team. A decade later, after receiving her undergraduate degree from the University of Wisconsin, Saunders returned to wrestling competition, participating in international women's freestyle wrestling.

== Wrestling career ==
In 1992, Saunders won the World Wrestling Championships in Villeurbanne, France, where she competed at 103.5 lbs, becoming the first American woman to win a world freestyle wrestling title. She won the silver medal at the 1993 World Championship, and three more gold medals at the 1996, 1998, and 1999 World Championships, the most world titles of any American woman at the time.

In 2006, Saunders became the first woman to be inducted as a Distinguished Member of the National Wrestling Hall of Fame. In 2011, she was inducted into the United World Wrestling Hall of Fame.

=== Coaching career ===
In 2004, Saunders became one of the first coaches of the U.S. Women's Olympic Wrestling Team at the 2004 Summer Olympics in Athens.

== Legacy ==
The Tricia Saunders High School Excellence Award, given by the National Wrestling Hall of Fame, is named in Saunders' honor. The award honors the most outstanding high school seniors in women's wrestling. Criteria include wrestling accomplishments, scholastic achievement, and community service.

== Personal ==
Saunders is married to Townsend Saunders, a 1996 Olympic silver medalist in men's freestyle wrestling. They have three children, two daughters, Tassia and Tatiana, and a son, Townsend.
