= Aleksandr Ignatenko (wrestler) =

Soviet wrestler (born 1963)

Personal information
- Nationality: Soviet
- Born: 29 March 1963 (age 62)

Sport
- Sport: Wrestling

Aleksandr Ignatenko (born 29 March 1963) is a Soviet wrestler. He competed at the 1988 Summer Olympics, the 1992 Summer Olympics and the 1996 Summer Olympics.
