= 2007 World Wrestling Championships – Women's freestyle 63 kg =

Women's freestyle 63 kg at the 2007 World Championships
- Venue: Heydar Aliyev Sports and Concert Complex
- Dates: 23 September 2007
- Competitors: 36 from 36 nations

Medalists
| gold medal | Kaori Icho | Japan |
| silver medal | Yelena Shalygina | Kazakhstan |
| bronze medal | Sara McMann | United States |
| bronze medal | Monika Rogien | Poland |

The women's freestyle 63 kilograms is a competition featured at the 2007 World Wrestling Championships, and was held at the Heydar Aliyev Sports and Concert Complex in Baku, Azerbaijan on 23 September 2007.

== Results ==
Legend

- F — Won by fall

=== Finals ===
| Semifinals | | | | Final |
| Kaori Icho (JPN) | 4 | 4 |
| Lise Legrand (FRA) | 2 | 0 | | Kaori Icho (JPN) | 1 | 3 |
| Yelena Shalygina (KAZ) | 1 | 5 | 4 | Yelena Shalygina (KAZ) | 0 | 0 |
| Yuliya Ostapchuk (UKR) | 1 | 0 | 1 |

=== Top half ===
==== Section 1 ====
Round of 64

Round of 32
Xu Haiyan (CHN) | 4^{F}
Teodora Dimitrova (BUL) | 0
Geetika Jakhar (IND) | 0 | 0
Maïté Piva (ITA) | 1 | 1
Karin Stingelin (SUI) | 0 | 0
Yoselin Rojas (VEN) | 5 | 2
Sara McMann (USA) | 1 | 0
Kaori Icho (JPN) | 2 | 1

Round of 16
Xu Haiyan (CHN) | 6 | 6
Maïté Piva (ITA) | 0 | 0
Yoselin Rojas (VEN) | 0
Kaori Icho (JPN) | 7^{F}

Quarterfinals
Xu Haiyan (CHN) | 0 | 1 | 0
Kaori Icho (JPN) | 2 | 0 | 1

==== Section 2 ====
Round of 64

Round of 32
Mabel Fonseca (PUR) | 0
Lise Legrand (FRA) | 4^{F}
Agoro Papavasileiou (GRE) | 0 | 0
Lubov Volosova (RUS) | 3 | 3
Lương Thị Quyên (VIE) | 2 | 7 | 0
Badrakhyn Odonchimeg (MGL) | 4 | 0 | 7^{F}
María Teresa Méndez (ESP) | 3 | 2 | 0
Stéphanie Kouassi (CIV) | 1 | 4 | 1

Round of 16
Lise Legrand (FRA) | 3 | 1
Lubov Volosova (RUS) | 0 | 0
Badrakhyn Odonchimeg (MGL) | 4 | 2 | 1
Stéphanie Kouassi (CIV) | 0 | 3 | 0

Quarterfinals
Lise Legrand (FRA) | 2 | 5
Badrakhyn Odonchimeg (MGL) | 0 | 1

=== Bottom half ===
==== Section 3 ====
Round of 64

Round of 32
Hang Jin-young (KOR) | 0 | 1 | 3
Mihaela Sadoveanu (ROU) | 1 | 0 | 1
Monika Rogien (POL) | 1 | 8
Haiat Farag (EGY) | 0 | 1
Helena Allandi (SWE) | 0 | 1
Yelena Shalygina (KAZ) | 2 | 3
Marianna Sastin (HUN) | 1 | 3
Marwa Amri (TUN) | 0 | 0

Round of 16
Hang Jin-young (KOR) | 0 | 0
Monika Rogien (POL) | 1 | 1
Yelena Shalygina (KAZ) | 3 | 6^{F}
Marianna Sastin (HUN) | 2 | 0

Quarterfinals
Monika Rogien (POL) | 0 | 0
Yelena Shalygina (KAZ) | 4 | 2

==== Section 4 ====
Round of 64
Volha Khilko (BLR) | 0 | 2 | 3
Megan Dolan (CAN) | 1 | 0 | 3
Karine Shadoyan (ARM) | 1 | 1
Nikola Hartmann (AUT) | 1 | 1
Khady Diatta (SEN) | 2 | 0 | 0
Olesya Zamula (AZE) | 0 | 2 | 4^{F}
Laura Skujiņa (LAT) | 0 | 3 | 0
Stefanie Stüber (GER) | 1 | 0 | 1

Round of 32
Hou Min-wen (TPE) | 1 | 3
Salomat Kuchimova (UZB) | 0 | 0
Yuliya Ostapchuk (UKR) | 7 | 3^{F}
Maria Dunn (GUM) | 0 | 0
Megan Dolan (CAN) | 0 | 0
Nikola Hartmann (AUT) | 1 | 3
Olesya Zamula (AZE) | 0 | 1 | 4^{F}
Stefanie Stüber (GER) | 3 | 0 | 1

Round of 16
Hou Min-wen (TPE) | 0 | 2
Yuliya Ostapchuk (UKR) | 2 | 5^{F}
Nikola Hartmann (AUT) | 1 | 1
Olesya Zamula (AZE) | 1 | 1

Quarterfinals
Yuliya Ostapchuk (UKR) | 5 | 1
Nikola Hartmann (AUT) | 3 | 0

=== Repechage ===
Repechage round 2
Sara McMann (USA) | 3 | 4^{F}
Yoselin Rojas (VEN) | 0 | 0
Helena Allandi (SWE) | 5 | 6
Marianna Sastin (HUN) | 2 | 0

Repechage round 3
Sara McMann (USA) | 2 | 3^{F}
Xu Haiyan (CHN) | 4 | 0
Helena Allandi (SWE) | 0 | 0
Monika Rogien (POL) | 2 | 3

Bronze medals
Sara McMann (USA) | 2 | 4
Lise Legrand (FRA) | 1 | 1
Monika Rogien (POL) | 1 | 1
Yuliya Ostapchuk (UKR) | 0 | 1
