= 2008 World Wrestling Championships – Women's freestyle 59 kg =

Women's freestyle 59 kg at the 2008 World Championships
- Venue: Yoyogi National Gymnasium
- Dates: 11 October 2008
- Competitors: 22 from 22 nations

Medalists
gold medal	Ayako Shoda	Japan
silver medal	Natalia Golts	Russia
bronze medal	Elvira Mursalova	Azerbaijan
bronze medal	Agata Pietrzyk	Poland

The women's freestyle 59 kilograms is a competition featured at the 2008 World Wrestling Championships, and was held at the Yoyogi National Gymnasium in Tokyo, Japan on 11 October.

This freestyle wrestling competition consists of a single-elimination tournament, with a repechage used to determine the winner of two bronze medals.

== Results ==
Legend

- F — Won by fall

=== Final ===
Final
Ayako Shoda (JPN)	3^{F}
Natalia Golts (RUS)	0

=== Top half ===
Round of 32

Round of 16
Ludmila Cristea (MDA)	0	3
Alla Cherkasova (UKR)	3	4
Elvira Mursalova (AZE)	3	6
Joice Silva (BRA)	0	0
Ayako Shoda (JPN)	6^{F}
Nestan Kiiazova (KGZ)	0
Alena Filipava (BLR)	0	0
Deanna Rix (USA)	1	2

Quarterfinals
Alla Cherkasova (UKR)	0	0
Elvira Mursalova (AZE)	1	1
Ayako Shoda (JPN)	1	4
Deanna Rix (USA)	0	0

Semifinals
Elvira Mursalova (AZE)	0
Ayako Shoda (JPN)	4^{F}

=== Bottom half ===
Round of 32
Salomat Kuchimova (UZB)	0	0
Natalia Golts (RUS)	7	3^{F}
Agata Pietrzyk (POL)	6	2
Anita Sheoran (IND)	0	1
Fabienne Wittenwiler (SUI)	0	1
Katie Patroch (CAN)	2	2
Birgit Stern (AUT)	0	1
Marianna Sastin (HUN)	2	2
Hou Min-wen (TPE)	0	0
Mirna Henríquez (VEN)	1	2
Enkhbayaryn Tsevegmid (MGL)	1	4
Sabrina Esposito (ITA)	0	7^{F}

Round of 16
Leyla Metin (TUR)	7^{F}
Gemma Silverio (PHI)	2
Natalia Golts (RUS)	3	3
Agata Pietrzyk (POL)	0	0
Katie Patroch (CAN)	1	1
Marianna Sastin (HUN)	1	0
Mirna Henríquez (VEN)	0	0
Sabrina Esposito (ITA)	1	1

Quarterfinals
Leyla Metin (TUR)	0
Natalia Golts (RUS)	5^{F}
Katie Patroch (CAN)	2	0
Sabrina Esposito (ITA)	3	1

Semifinals
Natalia Golts (RUS)	3^{F}
Sabrina Esposito (ITA)	0

=== Repechage ===
Repechage round 1
Salomat Kuchimova (UZB)	0
Agata Pietrzyk (POL)	4^{F}

Repechage round 2
Nestan Kiiazova (KGZ)	0	0
Deanna Rix (USA)	1	2
Agata Pietrzyk (POL)	6^{F}
Leyla Metin (TUR)	0

Bronze medals
Deanna Rix (USA)	0	0
Elvira Mursalova (AZE)	1	1
Agata Pietrzyk (POL)	2^{F}
Sabrina Esposito (ITA)	0
