= 2008 World Wrestling Championships – Women's freestyle 63 kg =

Women's freestyle 63 kg at the 2008 World Championships
- Venue: Yoyogi National Gymnasium
- Dates: 12 October 2008
- Competitors: 20 from 20 nations

Medalists
gold medal	Mio Nishimaki	Japan
silver medal	Lubov Volosova	Russia
bronze medal	Meng Lili	China
bronze medal	Audrey Prieto	France

The women's freestyle 63 kilograms is a competition featured at the 2008 World Wrestling Championships, and was held at the Yoyogi National Gymnasium in Tokyo, Japan on 12 October.

This freestyle wrestling competition consists of a single-elimination tournament, with a repechage used to determine the winner of two bronze medals.

== Results ==
Legend

- F — Won by fall

=== Final ===
Final
Mio Nishimaki (JPN)	5	4
Lubov Volosova (RUS)	0	0

=== Top half ===
Round of 32

Round of 16
Gloria Zavala (VEN)	1	0
Meng Lili (CHN)	1	4^{F}
Paulina Grabowska (POL)	0	0
Mio Nishimaki (JPN)	4	4
Badrakhyn Odonchimeg (MGL)	0	0
Olesya Zamula (AZE)	1	4
Nikola Hartmann (AUT)	1	0	2
Agoro Papavasileiou (GRE)	0	4	1

Quarterfinals
Meng Lili (CHN)	2
Mio Nishimaki (JPN)	6^{F}
Olesya Zamula (AZE)	1	1
Nikola Hartmann (AUT)	0	0

Semifinals
Mio Nishimaki (JPN)	3	1
Olesya Zamula (AZE)	0	0

=== Bottom half ===
Round of 32
Nguyễn Thị Tâm (VIE)	2
Audrey Prieto (FRA)	3^{F}
Olga Butkevych (GBR)	5^{F}
Hou Yi-fang (TPE)	0
Justine Bouchard (CAN)	3	2
Teodora Dimitrova (BUL)	1	0
Irina Netreba (UKR)	1	1
Geetika Jakhar (IND)	0	1

Round of 16
Hanna Beliayeva (BLR)	1
Lubov Volosova (RUS)	6^{F}
Alaina Berube (USA)	1	7
Simona Corbani (ITA)	0	0
Audrey Prieto (FRA)	1	5
Olga Butkevych (GBR)	0	0
Justine Bouchard (CAN)	0	2	2
Irina Netreba (UKR)	2	0	0

Quarterfinals
Lubov Volosova (RUS)	3	2
Alaina Berube (USA)	0	0
Audrey Prieto (FRA)	1	3
Justine Bouchard (CAN)	0	0

Semifinals
Lubov Volosova (RUS)	4^{F}
Audrey Prieto (FRA)	3

=== Repechage ===
Repechage round 2
Paulina Grabowska (POL)	0	0
Meng Lili (CHN)	1	3
Hanna Beliayeva (BLR)	1	4^{F}
Alaina Berube (USA)	7	1

Bronze medals
Meng Lili (CHN)	1	0	1
Olesya Zamula (AZE)	0	7	0
Hanna Beliayeva (BLR)	0
Audrey Prieto (FRA)	2^{F}
