= Anita Sheoran =

Indian wrestler (born 1984)

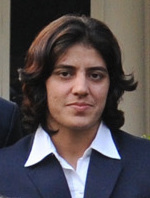
- Sheoran in 2010

Personal information
- Nationality: Indian
- Born: 24 November 1984 (age 41) Bhiwani district, Haryana
- Height: 161 cm (5 ft 3 in)
- Weight: 63 kg (139 lb)

Sport
- Country: India
- Sport: Freestyle wrestling
- Event: 63 kg
- Coached by: Zile Singh
Medal record
Women's Freestyle Wrestling
Representing India
Commonwealth Games
Gold medal – first place	2010 Delhi	67 kg
Asian Championships
Bronze medal – third place	2008 Jeju City	59 kg
Bronze medal – third place	2016 Bangkok	63 kg
Commonwealth Championships
Bronze medal – third place	2005 Stellenbosch	67 kg
Silver medal – second place	2009 Jalander	63 kg
Silver medal – second place	2011 Melbourne	63 kg
Silver medal – second place	2013 Johannesburg	67 kg
- Updated on 7 March 2016

Anita Sheoran (born 24 November 1984) is a female wrestler from India. She has won gold medal at the 2010 Commonwealth Games along with winning multiple medals at the Asian Wrestling Championships and the Commonwealth Wrestling Championships.

== Personal life ==
Anita Sheoran was born to Dilip Singh Sheoran and Santosh Devi in the Dhani Mahu village, which is situated in the Bhiwani district of Haryana. She is employed as an inspector in the Haryana Police.

== Career ==
=== 2005-08 ===
Participating at the 2005 Commonwealth Wrestling Championships in the 67 kg freestyle category, Sheoran won bronze medal.

At the 2008 Asian Wrestling Championships, Sheoran won bronze medal in the 59 kg freestyle event. Later in the year, she participated in the World Wrestling Championships, where she lost to the eventual bronze medalist Agata Pietrzyk in the first round.

=== 2009 ===
At the 2009 National Wrestling Championship in Bhopal, Sheoran, the 2008 National Championships silver medalist in the 59 kg category, participated in the 63 kg freestyle event. Her decision to shift to the higher weight class proved fruitful as she defeated the defending national champion Geetika Jakhar in the final to become the new champion in the women's 63 kg freestyle event. Later in the year, she participated at the Commonwealth Wrestling Championship, where she settled for silver medal after losing to the World Championships medalist Justine Bouchard of Canada.

=== 2010 ===
At the 2010 Commonwealth Games, after the first round bye and a comfortable win against the Scotland's Ashlea McManus, Sheoran, in the final, faced the Canada's Megan Buydens, who had defeated the Nigerian World Championships medalist Ifeoma Iheanacho in the opening round. Sheoran registered a comfortable victory against the Canadian to secure the gold medal in the 67 kg freestyle category.

=== 2011 ===
At the 34th National Games of India, which were held at Ranchi in 2011, Sheoran, representing Haryana, won gold medal by defeating Manipur's N Tombi Devi in the final of the women's 63 kg freestyle event. Later in the year, participating at the 2011 Commonwealth Wrestling Championships in Melbourne, Sheoran settled for silver medal after losing in the final against Canada's Dori Yeats.

=== 2012 ===
In her bid to qualify for the 2012 Summer Olympics, Sheoran participated in the Asian Olympic Qualification Tournament under the 63 kg freestyle category. She ended up winning bronze medal but could not secure an Olympic spot as reaching the final was the criteria for that. She defeated Chinese Taipei's Min-wen Hou before being defeated by the Olympic medalist Yelena Shalygina.

=== 2013-15 ===
Participating at the 2013 Commonwealth Wrestling Championships in Johannesburg, Sheoran settled for silver after losing to Nigeria's Ifeoma Iheanacho in the final.

At the 35th National Games of India, which were held at Kerala in 2015, Sheoran, representing Haryana, won gold medal by defeating Uttar Pradesh's Rajni by 4–2 in the final of the women's 63 kg freestyle event. In September, she participated in the 2015 World Wrestling Championships in the 63 kg category. She won against Nadiia Mushka by 9–1 in the round one. But lost her next bout against the Colombia's Sandra Roa by 2–5. Later in the year, she became the national champion in the women's 63 kg freestyle category.

=== 2016 ===
At the 2016 Asian Wrestling Championships, Sheoran, after losing to North Korea's Jong Sim Rim in the semifinal, won the bronze medal by defeating Uzbekistan's Nilufar Gadaeva (by fall) in the repechage round.
