= 2009 World Wrestling Championships – Women's freestyle 63 kg =

Women's freestyle 63 kg at the 2009 World Championships
- Venue: Messecenter Herning
- Dates: 24 September 2009
- Competitors: 25 from 25 nations

Medalists
gold medal	Mio Nishimaki	Japan
silver medal	Lubov Volosova	Russia
bronze medal	Yelena Shalygina	Kazakhstan
bronze medal	Justine Bouchard	Canada

The women's freestyle 63 kilograms is a competition featured at the 2009 World Wrestling Championships, and was held at the Messecenter Herning exhibition center in Herning, Denmark on September 24.

This freestyle wrestling competition consists of a single-elimination tournament, with a repechage used to determine the winner of two bronze medals.

== Results ==
Legend

- F — Won by fall

=== Final ===
Final
Mio Nishimaki (JPN)	1	8
Lubov Volosova (RUS)	0	1

=== Top half ===
Round of 32
Hanna Beliayeva (BLR)	3	3
Nikola Hartmann (AUT)	0	2^{F}

Round of 16
Zhao Junzhi (CHN)	0
Yuliya Ostapchuk (UKR)	4^{F}
Yelena Shalygina (KAZ)	3	1
Maria Diana (ITA)	0	0
Mio Nishimaki (JPN)	2	2
Olesya Zamula (AZE)	0	1
Stefanie Stüber (GER)	1	1
Nikola Hartmann (AUT)	0	0

Quarterfinals
Yuliya Ostapchuk (UKR)	0	0
Yelena Shalygina (KAZ)	1	2
Mio Nishimaki (JPN)	1	1	1
Stefanie Stüber (GER)	1	0	0

Semifinals
Yelena Shalygina (KAZ)	0	0
Mio Nishimaki (JPN)	3	5

=== Bottom half ===
Round of 32
Sharkhüügiin Tümentsetseg (MGL)	0	0
María Teresa Méndez (ESP)	3	1
Elina Vaseva (BUL)	6^{F}
Myskal Dzhancharova (KGZ)	0
Haiat Farag (EGY)	0	1
Monika Michalik (POL)	1	3
Dailane Reis (BRA)	7	3	0
Martina Zyklová (CZE)	0	3	4^{F}
Justine Bouchard (CAN)	6	6
Vanessa Torres (DOM)	0	0
Lubov Volosova (RUS)	4^{F}
Ayimgul Allamuratova (UZB)	0
Hang Jin-young (KOR)	3	0	1
Laura Skujiņa (LAT)	1	1	0
Aysel Can (TUR)	0	2
Elena Pirozhkova (USA)	7	3

Round of 16
María Teresa Méndez (ESP)	0	0
Elina Vaseva (BUL)	4	2
Monika Michalik (POL)	3	2
Martina Zyklová (CZE)	0	0
Justine Bouchard (CAN)	1	2	1
Lubov Volosova (RUS)	1	1	1
Hang Jin-young (KOR)	7	0	0
Elena Pirozhkova (USA)	0	2	4^{F}

Quarterfinals
Elina Vaseva (BUL)	0	1
Monika Michalik (POL)	1	1
Lubov Volosova (RUS)	5	2
Elena Pirozhkova (USA)	2	0

Semifinals
Monika Michalik (POL)	0	0
Lubov Volosova (RUS)	1	1

=== Repechage ===
Repechage round 1
Ayimgul Allamuratova (UZB)	0	0
Justine Bouchard (CAN)	6	6

Repechage round 2
Olesya Zamula (AZE)	1	0	6
Stefanie Stüber (GER)	0	3	2
Justine Bouchard (CAN)	5	3
Elena Pirozhkova (USA)	1	0

Bronze medals
Olesya Zamula (AZE)	0
Yelena Shalygina (KAZ)	4^{F}
Justine Bouchard (CAN)	2	1
Monika Michalik (POL)	0	0
