= 2006 World Wrestling Championships – Women's freestyle 63 kg =

Women's freestyle 63 kg at the 2006 World Championships
- Venue: Tianhe Gymnasium
- Dates: 1 October 2006
- Competitors: 28 from 28 nations

Medalists
gold medal	Kaori Icho	Japan
silver medal	Xu Haiyan	China
bronze medal	Monika Rogien	Poland
bronze medal	Helena Allandi	Sweden

The women's freestyle 63 kilograms is a competition featured at the 2006 World Wrestling Championships, and was held at the Tianhe Gymnasium in Guangzhou, China on 1 October 2006.

This freestyle wrestling competition consists of a single-elimination tournament, with a repechage used to determine the winner of two bronze medals.

== Results ==
Legend

- F — Won by fall

=== Final ===
Final
Kaori Icho (JPN)	1	1
Xu Haiyan (CHN)	0	0

=== Top half ===
Round of 32
Cherry Matriz (PHI)	0
Mihaela Sadoveanu (ROM)	4^{F}
Nikola Hartmann (AUT)	2	0	1
Yoselin Rojas (VEN)	1	2	1
Kaori Icho (JPN)	4	7
Megan Dolan (CAN)	0	2
Aurora Fajardo (ESP)	2	0	1
Nguyễn Thị Hải Yến (VIE)	0	3	1

Round of 16
Hou Min-wen (TPE)	0	0
Monika Rogien (POL)	1	2
Sandra Amado (COL)	0	0
Sara McMann (USA)	1	6
Mihaela Sadoveanu (ROM)	1	1
Yoselin Rojas (VEN)	3	4
Kaori Icho (JPN)	6	3^{F}
Nguyễn Thị Hải Yến (VIE)	0	0

Quarterfinals
Monika Rogien (POL)	1	2
Sara McMann (USA)	0	1
Yoselin Rojas (VEN)	0	0
Kaori Icho (JPN)	3	4

Semifinals
Monika Rogien (POL)	0	0
Kaori Icho (JPN)	2	1

=== Bottom half ===
Round of 32
Badrakhyn Odonchimeg (MGL)	1
Volha Khilko (BLR)	3^{F}
Oxana Shalikova (UKR)	1	0
Helena Allandi (SWE)	1	1
Karine Shadoyan (ARM)	7	7
Maria Dunn (GUM)	0	0
Meryem Selloum (FRA)	3	4^{F}
Suman Kundu (IND)	1	0
Maïté Piva (ITA)	3	1	1
Kim Hee-jeong (KOR)	1	2	0
Stéphanie Groß (GER)	0	0
Lubov Volosova (RUS)	1	1
Mónika Szerencse (HUN)	3	0	0
Agoro Papavasileiou (GRE)	0	2	6
Xu Haiyan (CHN)	6	3^{F}
Michala Spoustová (CZE)	1	0

Round of 16
Volha Khilko (BLR)	1	5	0
Helena Allandi (SWE)	3	4	3
Karine Shadoyan (ARM)	3^{F}
Meryem Selloum (FRA)	0
Maïté Piva (ITA)	0	0
Lubov Volosova (RUS)	3	6
Agoro Papavasileiou (GRE)	0	0
Xu Haiyan (CHN)	6	6

Quarterfinals
Helena Allandi (SWE)	0	3	1
Karine Shadoyan (ARM)	1	0	0
Lubov Volosova (RUS)	7	0	0
Xu Haiyan (CHN)	4	1	8

Semifinals
Helena Allandi (SWE)	0
Xu Haiyan (CHN)	4^{F}

=== Repechage ===
Repechage round 1
Megan Dolan (CAN)	3	6
Nguyễn Thị Hải Yến (VIE)	2	0
Michala Spoustová (CZE)	0	2	0
Agoro Papavasileiou (GRE)	2	0	1

Repechage round 2
Megan Dolan (CAN)	0
Yoselin Rojas (VEN)	3^{F}
Agoro Papavasileiou (GRE)	2	1	0
Lubov Volosova (RUS)	2	3	1

Bronze medals
Yoselin Rojas (VEN)	0	0
Monika Rogien (POL)	1	2
Lubov Volosova (RUS)	0	4	0
Helena Allandi (SWE)	6	1	1
