= 2009 World Wrestling Championships – Women's freestyle 59 kg =

Women's freestyle 59 kg at the 2009 World Championships
- Venue: Messecenter Herning
- Dates: 24 September 2009
- Competitors: 26 from 26 nations

Medalists
gold medal	Yuliya Ratkevich	Azerbaijan
silver medal	Agata Pietrzyk	Poland
bronze medal	Marianna Sastin	Hungary
bronze medal	Hanna Vasylenko	Ukraine

The women's freestyle 59 kilograms is a competition featured at the 2009 World Wrestling Championships, and was held at the Messecenter Herning exhibition center in Herning, Denmark on September 24.

This freestyle wrestling competition consists of a single-elimination tournament, with a repechage used to determine the winner of two bronze medals.

== Results ==
Legend

- D — Disqualified
- F — Won by fall

=== Final ===
Final
Yuliya Ratkevich (AZE)	1	4	5^{F}
Agata Pietrzyk (POL)	1	1	2

=== Top half ===
Round of 32
Olga Kiosova (RUS)	5	1
Kei Yamana (JPN)	2	0
Anastasija Grigorjeva (LAT)	0	2
Marianna Sastin (HUN)	5	4^{F}

Round of 16
Deanna Rix (USA)	4	1
Taybe Yusein (BUL)	0	0
Yuliya Ratkevich (AZE)	1	1	2
Joice Silva (BRA)	2	1	0
Aurora Fajardo (ESP)	2	3
Indrė Bubelytė (LTU)	0	1
Olga Kiosova (RUS)	1	1	D
Marianna Sastin (HUN)	1	1

Quarterfinals
Deanna Rix (USA)	0	3
Yuliya Ratkevich (AZE)	1	3
Aurora Fajardo (ESP)	4	0	0
Marianna Sastin (HUN)	1	1	1

Semifinals
Yuliya Ratkevich (AZE)	0	3	2
Marianna Sastin (HUN)	1	0	0

=== Bottom half ===
Round of 32
Meryem Selloum (FRA)	0
Olga Kalinina (KAZ)	3^{F}
Andrea Simon (ROU)	5	0	1
Katsiaryna Yanushkevich (BLR)	0	4	2
Natascha Ballas (GER)	3	3
Nestan Kiiazova (KGZ)	0	2
Soronzonboldyn Battsetseg (MGL)	1	3
Hanna Vasylenko (UKR)	1	7
Ludmila Cristea (MDA)	1	0	7
Yamilka del Valle (CUB)	1	1	2
Mirna Henríquez (VEN)	0	1
Agata Pietrzyk (POL)	1	4
Jia Mei (CHN)	1	1
Alka Tomar (IND)	0	0
Blessing Oborududu (NGR)	1
Katie Patroch (CAN)	3^{F}

Round of 16
Olga Kalinina (KAZ)	2	6
Katsiaryna Yanushkevich (BLR)	0	2
Natascha Ballas (GER)	1	0
Hanna Vasylenko (UKR)	3	2
Ludmila Cristea (MDA)	1	1
Agata Pietrzyk (POL)	4	1
Jia Mei (CHN)	0	1
Katie Patroch (CAN)	3	1

Quarterfinals
Olga Kalinina (KAZ)	0	0
Hanna Vasylenko (UKR)	3	1
Agata Pietrzyk (POL)	8	4^{F}
Katie Patroch (CAN)	1	0

Semifinals
Hanna Vasylenko (UKR)	0	1
Agata Pietrzyk (POL)	6	2

=== Repechage ===
Repechage round 1
Mirna Henríquez (VEN)	1	0
Ludmila Cristea (MDA)	3	1

Repechage round 2
Joice Silva (BRA)	0	1
Deanna Rix (USA)	1	2
Ludmila Cristea (MDA)	0	2
Katie Patroch (CAN)	2	2

Bronze medals
Deanna Rix (USA)	1	0	0
Marianna Sastin (HUN)	0	1	2
Katie Patroch (CAN)	0	0
Hanna Vasylenko (UKR)	1	4^{F}
