= 2009 World Wrestling Championships – Women's freestyle 67 kg =

Women's freestyle 67 kg at the 2009 World Championships
- Venue: Messecenter Herning
- Dates: 25 September 2009
- Competitors: 21 from 21 nations

Medalists
gold medal	Martine Dugrenier	Canada
silver medal	Yulia Bartnovskaya	Russia
bronze medal	Ifeoma Iheanacho	Nigeria
bronze medal	Badrakhyn Odonchimeg	Mongolia

The women's freestyle 67 kilograms is a competition featured at the 2009 World Wrestling Championships, and was held at the Messecenter Herning exhibition center in Herning, Denmark on September 25.

This freestyle wrestling competition consists of a single-elimination tournament, with a repechage used to determine the winner of two bronze medals.

== Results ==
Legend

- F — Won by fall

=== Final ===
Final
Yulia Bartnovskaya (RUS)	0
Martine Dugrenier (CAN)	4^{F}

=== Top half ===
Round of 32

Round of 16
Yulia Bartnovskaya (RUS)	0	2	1
Ma Yan (CHN)	1	1	0
Maria Müller (GER)	1	0	0
Adeline Gray (USA)	0	5	4
Ifeoma Iheanacho (NGR)	1	4
Karine Shadoyan (ARM)	0	0
Stephanie Maierhofer (AUT)	0	0
Kim Ji-eun (KOR)	1	3

Quarterfinals
Yulia Bartnovskaya (RUS)	1	4
Adeline Gray (USA)	0	1
Ifeoma Iheanacho (NGR)	3^{F}
Kim Ji-eun (KOR)	0

Semifinals
Yulia Bartnovskaya (RUS)	1	4	3
Ifeoma Iheanacho (NGR)	1	5	0

=== Bottom half ===
Round of 32
Yoshiko Inoue (JPN)	3	6
Aline Ferreira (BRA)	0	0
Gavhar Mirzaeva (UZB)	0	0
Zumrud Gurbanhajiyeva (AZE)	5	3
Martine Dugrenier (CAN)	2	2
Badrakhyn Odonchimeg (MGL)	0	1
Burcu Örskaya (TUR)	0	0
Iryna Tsyrkevich (BLR)	2	1
Kateryna Burmistrova (UKR)	2	3
Gloria Zabala (VEN)	0	0

Round of 16
Doaa Maher (EGY)	2	1	3
Geetika Jakhar (IND)	0	3	1
Olga Zhanibekova (KAZ)	0	0
Yoshiko Inoue (JPN)	1	1
Zumrud Gurbanhajiyeva (AZE)	0	0
Martine Dugrenier (CAN)	1	3
Iryna Tsyrkevich (BLR)	0	0
Kateryna Burmistrova (UKR)	1	1

Quarterfinals
Doaa Maher (EGY)	0	0
Yoshiko Inoue (JPN)	3	1
Martine Dugrenier (CAN)	1	1
Kateryna Burmistrova (UKR)	0	0

Semifinals
Yoshiko Inoue (JPN)	0	3	0
Martine Dugrenier (CAN)	1	1	1

=== Repechage ===
Repechage round 1
Badrakhyn Odonchimeg (MGL)	1	1	2^{F}
Zumrud Gurbanhajiyeva (AZE)	6	0	0

Repechage round 2
Ma Yan (CHN)	2	0
Adeline Gray (USA)	0	5^{F}
Badrakhyn Odonchimeg (MGL)	3	0	1
Kateryna Burmistrova (UKR)	1	1	0

Bronze medals
Adeline Gray (USA)	6	2	0
Ifeoma Iheanacho (NGR)	1	2	2
Badrakhyn Odonchimeg (MGL)	3	1
Yoshiko Inoue (JPN)	1	0
