= 2006 World Wrestling Championships – Women's freestyle 67 kg =

Women's freestyle 67 kg at the 2006 World Championships
- Venue: Tianhe Gymnasium
- Dates: 1 October 2006
- Competitors: 18 from 18 nations

Medalists
gold medal	Jing Ruixue	China
silver medal	Martine Dugrenier	Canada
bronze medal	Maria Müller	Germany
bronze medal	Eri Sakamoto	Japan

The women's freestyle 67 kilograms is a competition featured at the 2006 World Wrestling Championships, and was held at the Tianhe Gymnasium in Guangzhou, China on 1 October 2006.

This freestyle wrestling competition consists of a single-elimination tournament, with a repechage used to determine the winner of two bronze medals.

== Results ==
Legend

- F — Won by fall

=== Final ===
Final
Jing Ruixue (CHN)	2	2
Martine Dugrenier (CAN)	1	0

=== Top half ===
Round of 32

Round of 16
Iryna Tsyrkevich (BLR)	3	2
Anna Shamova (RUS)	0	0
Lương Thị Quyên (VIE)	2	2
María Teresa Méndez (ESP)	7	7
Masira Admiraal (NED)	1	1
Katie Downing (USA)	0	0
Jing Ruixue (CHN)	4	3
Maria Müller (GER)	0	0

Quarterfinals
Iryna Tsyrkevich (BLR)	0	3	0
María Teresa Méndez (ESP)	3	0	1
Masira Admiraal (NED)	0	0
Jing Ruixue (CHN)	5	3

Semifinals
María Teresa Méndez (ESP)	0	3
Jing Ruixue (CHN)	4	9

=== Bottom half ===
Round of 32
Jyoti (IND)	0	1
Gelegjamtsyn Naranchimeg (MGL)	6	3^{F}
Ashlea McManus (GBR)	0	0
Eri Sakamoto (JPN)	6	2

Round of 16
Stéphanie Kouassi (CIV)	0
Agnieszka Wieszczek (POL)	5^{F}
Diana Mudrag (ROM)	3	1	4^{F}
Kang Min-jeong (KOR)	0	2	1
Voleriya Zlatova (UKR)	0	0
Martine Dugrenier (CAN)	3	2
Gelegjamtsyn Naranchimeg (MGL)	0	3	0
Eri Sakamoto (JPN)	1	0	1

Quarterfinals
Agnieszka Wieszczek (POL)	1	1
Diana Mudrag (ROM)	5	5
Martine Dugrenier (CAN)	2	6^{F}
Eri Sakamoto (JPN)	1	0

Semifinals
Diana Mudrag (ROM)	4	2	2
Martine Dugrenier (CAN)	4	3	3

=== Repechage ===
Repechage round 2
Maria Müller (GER)	2	2
Masira Admiraal (NED)	1	0
Voleriya Zlatova (UKR)	0	0
Eri Sakamoto (JPN)	1	1

Bronze medals
Maria Müller (GER)	1	1
María Teresa Méndez (ESP)	0	0
Eri Sakamoto (JPN)	1	1
Diana Mudrag (ROM)	0	0
