= 2010 World Wrestling Championships – Women's freestyle 67 kg =

Women's freestyle 67 kg at the 2010 World Championships
- Venue: Olympic Stadium
- Dates: 10 September 2010
- Competitors: 17 from 17 nations

Medalists
gold medal	Martine Dugrenier	Canada
silver medal	Yelena Shalygina	Kazakhstan
bronze medal	Ifeoma Iheanacho	Nigeria
bronze medal	Alla Cherkasova	Ukraine

The women's freestyle 67 kilograms is a competition featured at the 2010 World Wrestling Championships, and was held at the Olympic Stadium in Moscow, Russia on 10 September.

This freestyle wrestling competition consists of a single-elimination tournament, with a repechage used to determine the winner of two bronze medals.

== Results ==
Legend

- F — Won by fall
- R — Retired
- WO — Won by walkover

=== Final ===
Final
Martine Dugrenier (CAN)	0	6	7
Yelena Shalygina (KAZ)	2	0	0

=== Top half ===
Round of 32

Round of 16
Alena Kartashova (RUS)	1	0	0
Ifeoma Iheanacho (NGR)	0	2	4^{F}
Maria Selmaier (GER)	3	0	4^{F}
Enas Mostafa (EGY)	2	5	0
Maja Erlandsen (NOR)	0
Martine Dugrenier (CAN)	3^{F}
Mami Shinkai (JPN)	9	5
Yanira Morales (PUR)	3	1

Quarterfinals
Ifeoma Iheanacho (NGR)	1	8^{F}
Maria Selmaier (GER)	0	0
Martine Dugrenier (CAN)	1	3
Mami Shinkai (JPN)	0	0

Semifinals
Ifeoma Iheanacho (NGR)	0	1
Martine Dugrenier (CAN)	3	5

=== Bottom half ===
Round of 32
Yelena Shalygina (KAZ)	6	4^{F}
Elgiza Anarbekova (KGZ)	0	0

Round of 16
Kristie Davis (USA)	1	0
Alla Cherkasova (UKR)	3	1
Volha Khilko (BLR)	3	0	0
Chen Ying (CHN)	0	3	3
Badrakhyn Odonchimeg (MGL)	0	0
Nadya Sementsova (AZE)	1	1
Burcu Örskaya (TUR)	0	0
Yelena Shalygina (KAZ)	2	2

Quarterfinals
Alla Cherkasova (UKR)	4	0	2
Chen Ying (CHN)	0	1	0
Nadya Sementsova (AZE)	3	0	0
Yelena Shalygina (KAZ)	0	3	2

Semifinals
Alla Cherkasova (UKR)	0	3	0
Yelena Shalygina (KAZ)	1	0	6

=== Repechage ===
Repechage round 1
Elgiza Anarbekova (KGZ)	0	0
Burcu Örskaya (TUR)	3	5^{F}

Repechage round 2
Maja Erlandsen (NOR)
Mami Shinkai (JPN)	W	O
Burcu Örskaya (TUR)	0	0
Nadya Sementsova (AZE)	1	1

Bronze medals
Mami Shinkai (JPN)	0
Ifeoma Iheanacho (NGR)	5^{F}
Nadya Sementsova (AZE)	0	0^{R}
Alla Cherkasova (UKR)	1	1
