= 2007 World Wrestling Championships – Women's freestyle 59 kg =

Women's freestyle 59 kg at the 2007 World Championships
- Venue: Heydar Aliyev Sports and Concert Complex
- Dates: 22 September 2007
- Competitors: 20 from 20 nations

Medalists
gold medal	Audrey Prieto	France
silver medal	Stéphanie Groß	Germany
bronze medal	Dorjiin Narmandakh	Mongolia
bronze medal	Nataliya Synyshyn	Ukraine

The women's freestyle 59 kilograms is a competition featured at the 2007 World Wrestling Championships, and was held at the Heydar Aliyev Sports and Concert Complex in Baku, Azerbaijan on 22 September 2007.

This freestyle wrestling competition consists of a single-elimination tournament, with a repechage used to determine the winner of two bronze medals.

== Results ==
Legend

- F — Won by fall

=== Final ===
Final
Stéphanie Groß (GER)	2	0	0
Audrey Prieto (FRA)	0	4	6

=== Top half ===
Round of 32

Round of 16
Su Lihui (CHN)	0	1
Dorjiin Narmandakh (MGL)	1	1
Miruyert Dynbayeva (KAZ)	4	2
Lin Chia-hua (TPE)	0	1
Simona Corbani (ITA)	0	0
Brittanee Laverdure (CAN)	1	2
Stéphanie Groß (GER)	3	2
Sona Ahmadli (AZE)	0	0

Quarterfinals
Dorjiin Narmandakh (MGL)	1	1
Miruyert Dynbayeva (KAZ)	0	0
Brittanee Laverdure (CAN)	0	0
Stéphanie Groß (GER)	1	1

Semifinals
Dorjiin Narmandakh (MGL)	0	0
Stéphanie Groß (GER)	1	4

=== Bottom half ===
Round of 32
Kitti Godó (HUN)	0	1
Agata Pietrzyk (POL)	1	4
Ayako Shoda (JPN)	1	1
Leigh Jaynes (USA)	1	0
Nataliya Synyshyn (UKR)	3	1
Kim Hee-jeong (KOR)	1	0
Larisa Kanaeva (RUS)	3	3^{F}
Kamlesh Devi (IND)	0	0

Round of 16
Audrey Prieto (FRA)	4^{F}
Sandra Roa (COL)	0
Georgiana Paic (ROU)	1	1	2
Tatsiana Bokhan (BLR)	1	0	0
Agata Pietrzyk (POL)	0	0
Ayako Shoda (JPN)	2	4^{F}
Nataliya Synyshyn (UKR)	3	8
Larisa Kanaeva (RUS)	0	0

Quarterfinals
Audrey Prieto (FRA)	2	3^{F}
Georgiana Paic (ROU)	1	0
Ayako Shoda (JPN)	1	0	0
Nataliya Synyshyn (UKR)	0	1	2

Semifinals
Audrey Prieto (FRA)	3^{F}
Nataliya Synyshyn (UKR)	3

=== Repechage ===
Repechage round 2
Sona Ahmadli (AZE)	1	0
Brittanee Laverdure (CAN)	3	3
Sandra Roa (COL)	4^{F}
Georgiana Paic (ROU)	0

Bronze medals
Brittanee Laverdure (CAN)	0	1	1
Dorjiin Narmandakh (MGL)	1	0	6
Sandra Roa (COL)	0	1
Nataliya Synyshyn (UKR)	5	3
