= Wrestling at the 2006 Asian Games – Women's freestyle 63 kg =

Women's freestyle 63 kg at the 2006 Asian Games
- Venue: Aspire Hall 4
- Date: 11 December 2006
- Competitors: 10 from 10 nations

Medalists
gold medal	Kaori Icho	Japan
silver medal	Geetika Jakhar	India
bronze medal	Badrakhyn Odonchimeg	Mongolia
bronze medal	Xu Haiyan	China

The women's freestyle 63 kilograms wrestling competition at the 2006 Asian Games in Doha was held on 11 December 2006 at the Aspire Hall 4.

This freestyle wrestling competition consisted of a single-elimination tournament, with a repechage used to determine the winner of two bronze medals. The two finalists faced off for gold and silver medals. Each wrestler who lost to one of the two finalists moved into the repechage, culminating in a pair of bronze medal matches featuring the semifinal losers each facing the remaining repechage opponent from their half of the bracket.

Each bout consisted of up to three rounds, lasting two minutes apiece. The wrestler who scored more points in each round was the winner of that rounds; the bout finished when one wrestler had won two rounds (and thus the match).

== Schedule ==
All times are Arabia Standard Time (UTC+03:00)

Date	Time	Event
Monday, 11 December 2006	09:00	Preliminary
Monday, 11 December 2006	09:00	Quarterfinals
Monday, 11 December 2006	09:00	Semifinals
Monday, 11 December 2006	18:00	Finals

== Results ==
Legend

- F — Won by fall

=== Main bracket ===
Preliminary
Yelena Shalygina (KAZ)	0	3
Xu Haiyan (CHN)	3	3^{F}
Asel Imanalieva (KGZ)	0
Gemma Silverio (PHI)	4^{F}

Quarterfinals
Kim Hee-jeong (KOR)	0	1	0
Geetika Jakhar (IND)	1	0	1
Hou Min-wen (TPE)	0	0
Badrakhyn Odonchimeg (MGL)	4	2
Kaori Icho (JPN)	6	5
Nguyễn Thị Hải Yến (VIE)	0	0
Xu Haiyan (CHN)	6^{F}
Gemma Silverio (PHI)	0

Semifinals
Geetika Jakhar (IND)	1	1
Badrakhyn Odonchimeg (MGL)	0	0
Kaori Icho (JPN)	1	1
Xu Haiyan (CHN)	0	0

Gold medal match
Geetika Jakhar (IND)	0	0
Kaori Icho (JPN)	3	6^{F}

=== Repechage ===
Bronze medal match
Kim Hee-jeong (KOR)	0	1	0
Badrakhyn Odonchimeg (MGL)	4	1	1
Nguyễn Thị Hải Yến (VIE)	0	0
Xu Haiyan (CHN)	6	8

== Final standing ==
Rank	Athlete
1st place, gold medalist(s)	Kaori Icho (JPN)
2nd place, silver medalist(s)	Geetika Jakhar (IND)
3rd place, bronze medalist(s)	Badrakhyn Odonchimeg (MGL)
3rd place, bronze medalist(s)	Xu Haiyan (CHN)
5	Kim Hee-jeong (KOR)
5	Nguyễn Thị Hải Yến (VIE)
7	Gemma Silverio (PHI)
8	Yelena Shalygina (KAZ)
9	Asel Imanalieva (KGZ)
10	Hou Min-wen (TPE)
