= 2013 European Wrestling Championships – Women's freestyle 63 kg =

The women's freestyle 63 kg is a competition featured at the 2013 European Wrestling Championships, and was held at the Tbilisi Sports Palace in Tbilisi, Georgia on 22 March 2013.

== Medalists ==
Gold	Anastasija Grigorjeva; Latvia
Silver	Monika Michalik; Poland
Bronze	Hanna Beliayeva; Azerbaijan
Bronze	Ganna Vasylenko; Ukraine

== Results ==
Legend

- F — Won by fall

=== Main Draw ===
Round of 16
Mirjana Martinović (MNE)	3	0	0
Irene García (ESP)	1	4	1
Laura Raffler (AUT)	1	0
Buse Tosun (TUR)	2	6
Henna Johansson (SWE)	0	0
Hanna Beliayeva (AZE)	3	6^{F}
Agoro Papavasileiou (GRE)	2	1	0
Anastasija Grigorjeva (LAT)	1	4	6
Maria Mamashuk (BLR)	0	0
Inna Trazhukova (RUS)	3	3
Hanna Vasylenko (UKR)	2	8^{F}
Fruzsina Forgó (HUN)	0	0
Monika Michalik (POL)	2	1	5
Nadine Weinauge (GER)	0	4	0
Elina Vaseva (BUL)	2	3
Beatrice Oancea (ROU)	0	0

Quarterfinals
Irene García (ESP)	3	0	5
Buse Tosun (TUR)	2	6	3
Hanna Beliayeva (AZE)	1	0	2
Anastasija Grigorjeva (LAT)	0	6	7
Inna Trazhukova (RUS)	4	3	0
Hanna Vasylenko (UKR)	0	3	5
Monika Michalik (POL)	0	1	1
Elina Vaseva (BUL)	1	1	0

Semifinals
Irene García (ESP)	1	0
Anastasija Grigorjeva (LAT)	8	4^{F}
Hanna Vasylenko (UKR)	2	0
Monika Michalik (POL)	2	3

Final
Anastasija Grigorjeva (LAT)	1	6
Monika Michalik (POL)	0	0

=== Repechage ===
Repechage round 1
Agoro Papavasileiou (GRE)	0	0
Hanna Beliayeva (AZE)	1	2
Nadine Weinauge (GER)	0	0
Elina Vaseva (BUL)	2	2

Bronze medals
Hanna Beliayeva (AZE)	4^{F}
Irene García (ESP)	0
Elina Vaseva (BUL)	3
Hanna Vasylenko (UKR)	4^{F}
