= Wrestling at the 2008 Summer Olympics – Women's freestyle 63 kg =

Women's freestyle 63 kg at the Games of the XXIX Olympiad
- Venue: China Agricultural University Gymnasium
- Date: 17 August 2008
- Competitors: 17 from 17 nations

Medalists
1st place, gold medalist(s)		Kaori Icho	Japan
2nd place, silver medalist(s)		Alena Kartashova	Russia
3rd place, bronze medalist(s)		Yelena Shalygina	Kazakhstan
3rd place, bronze medalist(s)		Randi Miller	United States

Women's freestyle 63 kilograms competition at the 2008 Summer Olympics in Beijing, China, was held on August 17 at the China Agricultural University Gymnasium.

This freestyle wrestling competition consisted of a single-elimination tournament, with a repechage used to determine the winner of two bronze medals. The two finalists faced off for gold and silver medals. Each wrestler who lost to one of the two finalists moved into the repechage, culminating in a pair of bronze medal matches featuring the semifinal losers each facing the remaining repechage opponent from their half of the bracket.

Each bout consisted of up to three rounds, lasting two minutes apiece. The wrestler who scored more points in each round was the winner of that rounds; the bout finished when one wrestler had won two rounds (and thus the match).

== Schedule ==
All times are China Standard Time (UTC+08:00)

Date	Time	Event
17 August 2008	09:30	Qualification rounds
17 August 2008	16:00	Repechage
17 August 2008	16:30	Finals

== Results ==
Legend

- F — Won by fall

=== Final ===
Final
Alena Kartashova (RUS)	0	0
Kaori Icho (JPN)	1	2

=== Top half ===
Qualifications

1/8 finals
Maria Dunn (GUM)	0	0
Elina Vaseva (BUL)	5	7^{F}
Yelena Shalygina (KAZ)	0	0
Alena Kartashova (RUS)	1	3
Volha Khilko (BLR)	1	0	3
Monika Michalik (POL)	0	1	3^{F}
María Teresa Méndez (ESP)	0	0
Lise Legrand (FRA)	1	2

Quarterfinals
Elina Vaseva (BUL)	0	1
Alena Kartashova (RUS)	6	2
Monika Michalik (POL)	0	3	1
Lise Legrand (FRA)	1	0	3

Semifinals
Alena Kartashova (RUS)	1	2	6
Lise Legrand (FRA)	2	1	0

=== Bottom half ===
Qualifications
Randi Miller (USA)	3^{F}
Haiat Farag (EGY)	0

1/8 finals
Marianna Sastin (HUN)	0	0
Martine Dugrenier (CAN)	2	6^{F}
Xu Haiyan (CHN)	5	4
Badrakhyn Odonchimeg (MGL)	3	0
Kaori Icho (JPN)	2	3^{F}
Olesya Zamula (AZE)	0	0
Yuliya Ostapchuk (UKR)	2	0	0
Randi Miller (USA)	0	2	3

Quarterfinals
Martine Dugrenier (CAN)	2	1	1
Xu Haiyan (CHN)	1	3	0
Kaori Icho (JPN)	3	6^{F}
Randi Miller (USA)	0	0

Semifinals
Martine Dugrenier (CAN)	0	1	1
Kaori Icho (JPN)	1	0	1

=== Repechage ===
Repechage round 2
Yelena Shalygina (KAZ)	5	5
Elina Vaseva (BUL)	0	0
Olesya Zamula (AZE)	0	0
Randi Miller (USA)	2	3^{F}

Bronze medals
Yelena Shalygina (KAZ)	5	3
Lise Legrand (FRA)	0	2
Randi Miller (USA)	1	1	1
Martine Dugrenier (CAN)	0	2	1

== Final standing ==
Rank	Athlete
1st place, gold medalist(s)	Kaori Icho (JPN)
2nd place, silver medalist(s)	Alena Kartashova (RUS)
3rd place, bronze medalist(s)	Yelena Shalygina (KAZ)
3rd place, bronze medalist(s)	Randi Miller (USA)
5	Lise Legrand (FRA)
5	Martine Dugrenier (CAN)
7	Elina Vaseva (BUL)
8	Monika Michalik (POL)
9	Xu Haiyan (CHN)
10	Badrakhyn Odonchimeg (MGL)
11	Yuliya Ostapchuk (UKR)
12	Volha Khilko (BLR)
13	Haiat Farag (EGY)
13	María Teresa Méndez (ESP)
15	Marianna Sastin (HUN)
16	Olesya Zamula (AZE)
17	Maria Dunn (GUM)
