= 2011 World Wrestling Championships – Women's freestyle 67 kg =

Women's freestyle 67 kg at the 2011 World Championships
- Venue: Sinan Erdem Dome
- Dates: 16 September 2011
- Competitors: 14 from 14 nations

Medalists
gold medal	Xiluo Zhuoma	China
silver medal	Banzragchiin Oyuunsüren	Mongolia
bronze medal	Yoshiko Inoue	Japan
bronze medal	Adeline Gray	United States

The women's freestyle 67 kilograms is a competition featured at the 2011 World Wrestling Championships, and was held at the Sinan Erdem Dome in Istanbul, Turkey on 16 September 2011.

This freestyle wrestling competition consisted of a single-elimination tournament, with a repechage used to determine the winners of two bronze medals. The two finalists faced off for gold and silver medals. Each wrestler who lost to one of the two finalists moved into the repechage, culminating in a pair of bronze medal matches featuring the semifinal losers each facing the remaining repechage opponent from their half of the bracket.

Each bout consisted of up to three rounds, lasting two minutes apiece. The wrestler who scored more points in each round was the winner of that rounds; the bout finished when one wrestler had won two rounds (and thus the match).

Xiluo Zhuoma from China won the gold medal without losing a round in her four matches. she beat Banzragchiin Oyuunsüren of Mongolia 1–0 and 1–0 in the final. Yoshiko Inoue from Japan and the American Adeline Gray finished third and shared the bronze medal.

== Results ==
Legend

- F — Won by fall

=== Main bracket ===
Round of 16
Yoshiko Inoue (JPN)	2	2
Sarah Jones (GBR)	0	0
Natalia Kuksina (RUS)	1	1
Nadya Sementsova (AZE)	1	1
Vasiliki Gkika (GRE)	0	0
Iryna Tsyrkevich (BLR)	6	4^{F}
Aline Focken (GER)	1	1	0
Burcu Örskaya (TUR)	1	0	2
Adeline Gray (USA)	1	0
Xiluo Zhuoma (CHN)	4	1
Martine Dugrenier (CAN)	4^{F}
Tatyana Zakharova (KAZ)	0

Quarterfinals
Banzragchiin Oyuunsüren (MGL)	1	1
Alina Makhynia (UKR)	0	0
Yoshiko Inoue (JPN)	1	0	1
Nadya Sementsova (AZE)	0	1	0
Iryna Tsyrkevich (BLR)	0	0
Burcu Örskaya (TUR)	1	1
Xiluo Zhuoma (CHN)	1	3
Martine Dugrenier (CAN)	1	1

Semifinals
Banzragchiin Oyuunsüren (MGL)	1	2
Yoshiko Inoue (JPN)	0	0
Burcu Örskaya (TUR)	0	0
Xiluo Zhuoma (CHN)	3	2

Final
Banzragchiin Oyuunsüren (MGL)	0	0
Xiluo Zhuoma (CHN)	1	1

=== Repechage ===
Repechage round 1
Adeline Gray (USA)	1	3
Martine Dugrenier (CAN)	1	1

Bronze medals
Alina Makhynia (UKR)	0	0
Yoshiko Inoue (JPN)	1	1
Adeline Gray (USA)	1	1
Burcu Örskaya (TUR)	0	0
