= Wrestling at the 2012 Summer Olympics – Women's freestyle 63 kg =

Women's freestyle 63 kg at the Games of the XXX Olympiad
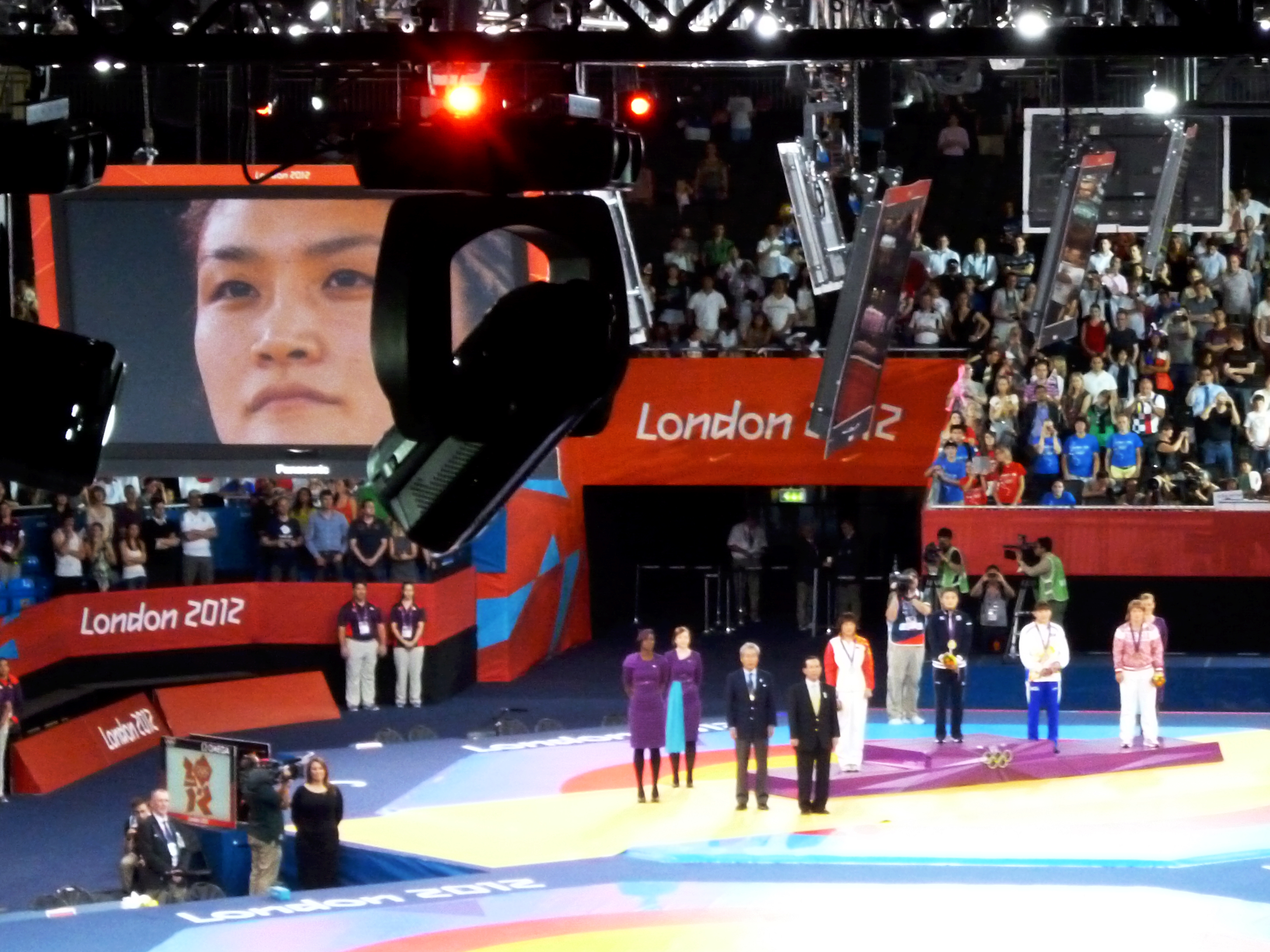
- Women's freestyle 63 kg victory ceremony
- Venue: ExCeL London
- Date: 8 August 2012
- Competitors: 20 from 20 nations

Medalists
1st place, gold medalist(s)		Kaori Icho	Japan
2nd place, silver medalist(s)		Jing Ruixue	China
3rd place, bronze medalist(s)		Soronzonboldyn Battsetseg	Mongolia
3rd place, bronze medalist(s)		Lubov Volosova	Russia

Women's freestyle 63 kilograms competition at the 2012 Summer Olympics in London, United Kingdom, took place on 8 August at ExCeL London.

This freestyle wrestling competition consists of a single-elimination tournament, with a repechage used to determine the winner of two bronze medals. The two finalists face off for gold and silver medals. Each wrestler who loses to one of the two finalists moves into the repechage, culminating in a pair of bronze medal matches featuring the semifinal losers each facing the remaining repechage opponent from their half of the bracket.

Each bout consists of up to three rounds, lasting two minutes apiece. The wrestler who scores more points in each round is the winner of that rounds; the bout ends when one wrestler has won two rounds (and thus the match).

== Schedule ==
All times are British Summer Time (UTC+01:00)

Date	Time	Event
8 August 2012	13:00	Qualification rounds
8 August 2012	17:45	Repechage
8 August 2012	18:45	Finals

== Results ==
Legend

- F — Won by fall

=== Final ===
Final
Kaori Icho (JPN)	3	2
Jing Ruixue (CHN)	0	0

=== Top half ===
Qualifications

1/8 finals
Sylvie Datty (CAF)	0	0
Soronzonboldyn Battsetseg (MGL)	4	4^{F}
Anastasija Grigorjeva (LAT)	0	5	2
Elena Pirozhkova (USA)	2	0	0
Aisuluu Tynybekova (KGZ)	2	0
Henna Johansson (SWE)	3	2
Martine Dugrenier (CAN)	0	1
Kaori Icho (JPN)	4	2

1/4 finals
Soronzonboldyn Battsetseg (MGL)	5	5
Anastasija Grigorjeva (LAT)	0	4
Henna Johansson (SWE)	0	0
Kaori Icho (JPN)	1	4

Semifinals
Soronzonboldyn Battsetseg (MGL)	0	0
Kaori Icho (JPN)	1	4

=== Bottom half ===
Qualifications
Maria Dunn (GUM)	0
Lubov Volosova (RUS)	5^{F}
Elif Jale Yeşilırmak (TUR)	1
Katerina Vidiaux (CUB)	5^{F}
Yelena Shalygina (KAZ)	2	2
Yuliya Ostapchuk (UKR)	0	3^{F}
Jacira Mendonca (GBS)	0	0
Marianna Sastin (HUN)	3	1

1/8 finals
Choe Un-gyong (PRK)	2	0
Jing Ruixue (CHN)	7	1
Monika Michalik (POL)	2	3
Blessing Oborududu (NGR)	0	0
Lubov Volosova (RUS)	2	3
Katerina Vidiaux (CUB)	1	2
Yuliya Ostapchuk (UKR)	4	1
Marianna Sastin (HUN)	0	0

1/4 finals
Jing Ruixue (CHN)	3	2
Monika Michalik (POL)	0	0
Lubov Volosova (RUS)	1	2
Yuliya Ostapchuk (UKR)	0	1

Semifinals
Jing Ruixue (CHN)	2	1	1
Lubov Volosova (RUS)	3	0	0

=== Repechage ===
Repechage round 2
Martine Dugrenier (CAN)	1	2	6
Henna Johansson (SWE)	1	1	0
Choe Un-gyong (PRK)	0	1
Monika Michalik (POL)	1	4

Bronze medals
Martine Dugrenier (CAN)	0	0
Soronzonboldyn Battsetseg (MGL)	2	1
Monika Michalik (POL)	1	1	0
Lubov Volosova (RUS)	0	3	1

== Final standing ==
Rank	Athlete
1st place, gold medalist(s)	Kaori Icho (JPN)
2nd place, silver medalist(s)	Jing Ruixue (CHN)
3rd place, bronze medalist(s)	Soronzonboldyn Battsetseg (MGL)
3rd place, bronze medalist(s)	Lubov Volosova (RUS)
5	Martine Dugrenier (CAN)
5	Monika Michalik (POL)
7	Yuliya Ostapchuk (UKR)
8	Katerina Vidiaux (CUB)
9	Anastasija Grigorjeva (LAT)
10	Henna Johansson (SWE)
11	Marianna Sastin (HUN)
12	Choe Un-gyong (PRK)
13	Aisuluu Tynybekova (KGZ)
14	Elena Pirozhkova (USA)
15	Yelena Shalygina (KAZ)
16	Elif Jale Yeşilırmak (TUR)
17	Jacira Mendonca (GBS)
18	Maria Dunn (GUM)
18	Blessing Oborududu (NGR)
20	Sylvie Datty (CAF)
