= 2014 European Wrestling Championships – Women's freestyle 58 kg =

Wrestling competitions

The women's freestyle 58 kg is a competition featured at the 2014 European Wrestling Championships, and was held in Vantaa, Finland on 1 April 2014.

== Medalists ==
Gold	Valeria Koblova; Russia
Silver	Irina Netreba; Azerbaijan
Bronze	Viktoria Bobeva; Bulgaria
Bronze	Petra Olli; Finland

== Results ==
Legend

- F — Won by fall

=== Bracket ===
Round of 16
Marianna Sastin (HUN)	9^{F}
Karima Sánchez (ESP)	0
Petra Olli (FIN)	11
Katarzyna Michalak (POL)	0
Luisa Niemesch (GER)	6
Carola Rainero (ITA)	5
Irina Petrova (LAT)	0
Valeria Koblova (RUS)	10

Quarterfinals
Irina Netreba (AZE)	8
Viktoria Bobeva (BUL)	4
Hanna Vasylenko (UKR)	10
Anastasiya Huchok (BLR)	16
Marianna Sastin (HUN)	1
Petra Olli (FIN)	2
Luisa Niemesch (GER)	0
Valeria Koblova (RUS)	10

Semifinals
Irina Netreba (AZE)	6
Anastasiya Huchok (BLR)	1
Petra Olli (FIN)	1
Valeria Koblova (RUS)	8

Final
Irina Netreba (AZE)	0
Valeria Koblova (RUS)	5

=== Repechage ===
Repechage round 1
Irina Petrova (LAT)	4
Luisa Niemesch (GER)	15

Bronze medal match
Viktoria Bobeva (BUL)	6
Anastasiya Huchok (BLR)	5
Luisa Niemesch (GER)	2
Petra Olli (FIN)	5
