= Lee Eun-kyung =

Lee Eun-kyung may refer to:

- Lee Eun-kyung (volleyball) (born 1961), South Korean volleyball player
- Lee Eun-kyung (archer) (born 1972)
- Lee Eun-kyung (field hockey) (born 1972), South Korean field hockey player
- Lee Eun-gyeong (archer) (born 1997), South Korean archer
- Ri Un-gyong (born 1980), North Korean football midfielder

== See also ==
- Lee (Korean surname)
- Eun-kyung, Korean given name
