= Choi Eun-gyeong =

Choi Eun-gyeong (Korean: 최은경) may refer to:

- Choi Eun-kyung (field hockey) (born 1971), South Korean field hockey player
- Choi Eun-kyung (born 1984), South Korean short track speed skater
- Choe Un-gyong (wrestler) (born 1990), North Korean sport wrestler
- Choe Un-gyong (diver) (born 1994), North Korean diver
