= 2012 World Wrestling Championships – Women's freestyle 63 kg =

Women's freestyle 48 kg at the 2012 World Championships
- Venue: Millennium Place
- Dates: 29 September 2012
- Competitors: 19 from 19 nations

Medalists
gold medal	Elena Pirozhkova	United States
silver medal	Taybe Yusein	Bulgaria
bronze medal	Justine Bouchard	Canada
bronze medal	Xiluo Zhuoma	China

The women's freestyle 63 kilograms is a competition featured at the 2012 World Wrestling Championships, and was held at the Millennium Place in Strathcona County, Alberta, Canada on 29 September 2012.

== Results ==
Legend

- F — Won by fall

=== Final ===
Final
Taybe Yusein (BUL)	1	5	0
Elena Pirozhkova (USA)	2	2	1

=== Top half ===
Round of 32

Round of 16
Taybe Yusein (BUL)	0	2	1
Monika Michalik (POL)	2	1	0
Anastasiya Huchok (BLR)	1	0
Justine Bouchard (CAN)	4	6
Sakshi Malik (IND)	0
Alla Cherkasova (UKR)	4^{F}
Yelena Shalygina (KAZ)	2	3
Mariana Kolic (FRA)	0	0

Quarterfinals
Taybe Yusein (BUL)	4	1	1
Justine Bouchard (CAN)	1	3	0
Alla Cherkasova (UKR)	1	2	1
Yelena Shalygina (KAZ)	0	3	3

Semifinals
Taybe Yusein (BUL)	2	3
Yelena Shalygina (KAZ)	1	3

=== Bottom half ===
Round of 32
Andrea Simon (ROU)	1	2	0
Hanna Beliayeva (AZE)	0	3	1
Xiluo Zhuoma (CHN)	1	0	2
Anastasia Bratchikova (RUS)	0	1	0
Aline Focken (GER)	1	1	2
Agoro Papavasileiou (GRE)	1	0	1

Round of 16
Elena Pirozhkova (USA)	4^{F}
Hou Min-wen (TPE)	0
Ochirbatyn Nasanburmaa (MGL)	0	4	2
Kayoko Kudo (JPN)	1	1	4
Michala Spoustová (CZE)	0	0
Hanna Beliayeva (AZE)	3	6
Xiluo Zhuoma (CHN)	2	2
Aline Focken (GER)	0	0

Quarterfinals
Elena Pirozhkova (USA)	2	4^{F}
Kayoko Kudo (JPN)	0	0
Hanna Beliayeva (AZE)	0	0
Xiluo Zhuoma (CHN)	4	1

Semifinals
Elena Pirozhkova (USA)	1	4
Xiluo Zhuoma (CHN)	0	0

=== Repechage ===
Repechage round 2
Monika Michalik (POL)	0	1
Justine Bouchard (CAN)	1	2
Hou Min-wen (TPE)	0	0
Kayoko Kudo (JPN)	1	6

Bronze medals
Justine Bouchard (CAN)	1	1
Yelena Shalygina (KAZ)	1	0
Kayoko Kudo (JPN)	2	1	0
Xiluo Zhuoma (CHN)	4	0	3
