= Marshwood High School =

Location
- 260 Dow Highway; South Berwick, Maine 03908; United States; 43°12′03″N 70°47′50″W

Information
- Type: Public high school
- Established: 1966
- Oversight: MSAD 35
- Principal: Richard Gowers
- Teaching staff: 51.00 (FTE)
- Grades: 9–12
- Enrollment: 669 (2023-2024)
- Student to teacher ratio: 13.12
- Campus size: Medium
- Campus type: Suburban
- Colors: Purple and White
- Mascot: Hawk
- Team name: Marshwood Hawks
- Accreditation: New England Association of Schools and Colleges
- Newspaper: The Scroll
- Yearbook: The Reed
- Communities served: Eliot; South Berwick; Rollinsford
- Feeder schools: Marshwood Middle School
- Website: www.rsu35.org/o/mhs

Marshwood High School is a public high school in York County, Maine, United States. It serves the towns of Eliot and South Berwick, as well as Rollinsford, New Hampshire. It has been at its current location at 260 Dow Highway (Route 236) in South Berwick since September 1999, when it was moved from its previous location in Eliot. The current site is about 10 miles (16 km) from both Portsmouth, New Hampshire, and Kittery, Maine.

The school's mascot is the Hawk.

The school offers a variety of varsity athletics.

== History ==
In 1966, the towns of Eliot and South Berwick joined to form MSAD #35, and a new high school was built on Depot Road in Eliot. The high school was relocated to Route 236 in South Berwick in 2000.

== Notable alumni ==
- Rachel Accurso (Ms. Rachel), YouTuber, educator, singer-songwriter, and activist
- Jonathan Courtney, State Senator
- Dennis Martel, Hall of Fame Baseball Coach
- Deanna Rix, wrestler
- Thomas F. Spencer, US Army major general
