= Martine Dugrenier =

Canadian wrestler (born 1979)

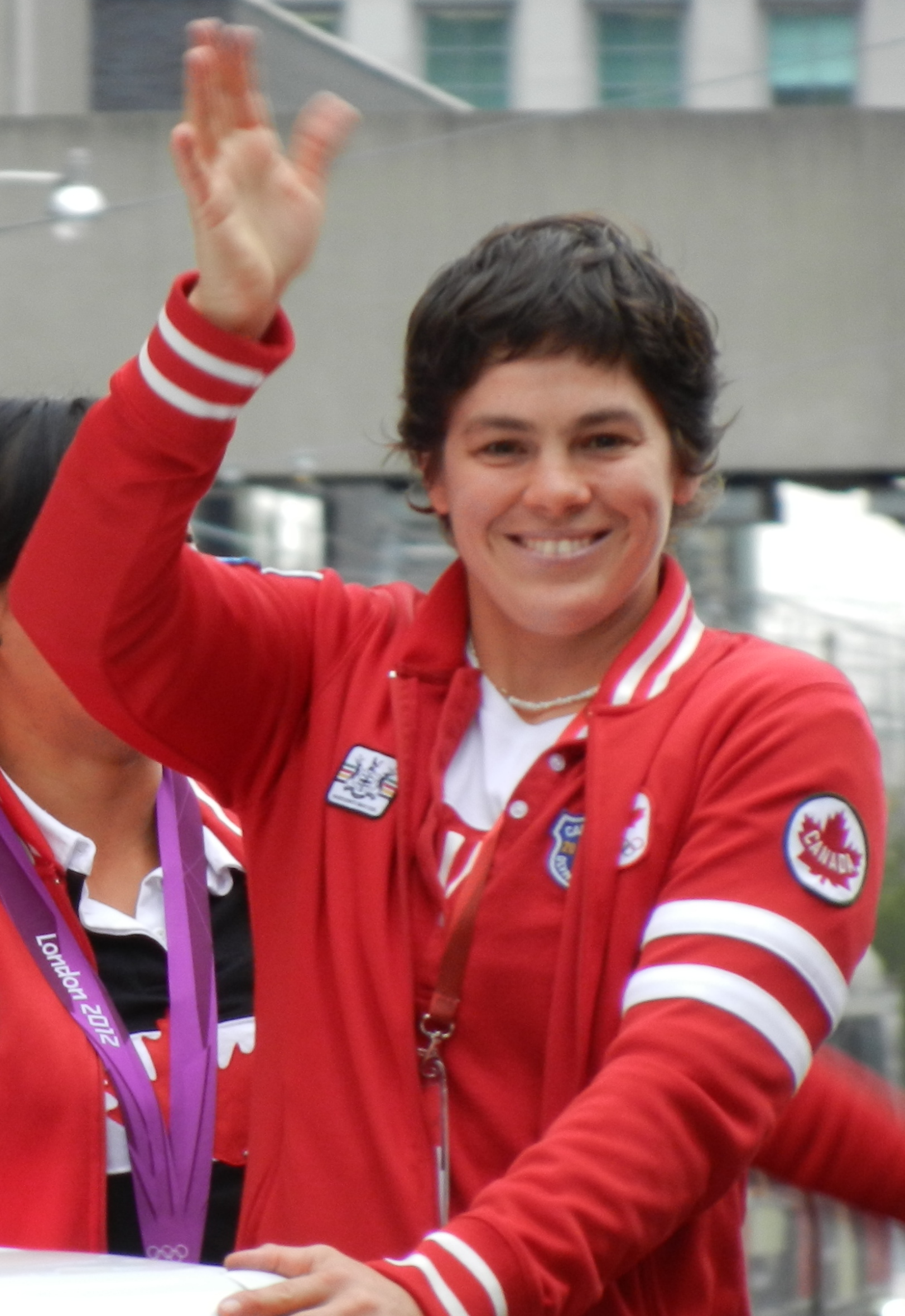
- Dugrenier at the Olympic Heroes Parade in Toronto (September 2012)

Personal information
- Born: June 12, 1979 (age 47) Laval, Quebec, Canada
- Height: 1.66 m (5 ft 5 in)
- Weight: 63 kg (139 lb; 9 st 13 lb)

Sport
- Country: Canada
- Sport: Wrestling
Medal record
Women's freestyle wrestling
Representing Canada
World Championships
Gold medal – first place	2008 Tokyo	67 kg
Gold medal – first place	2009 Herning	67 kg
Gold medal – first place	2010 Moscow	67 kg
Silver medal – second place	2005 Budapest	67 kg
Silver medal – second place	2006 Guangzhou	67 kg
Silver medal – second place	2007 Baku	67 kg

Martine Dugrenier (born June 12, 1979) is a Canadian retired wrestler. A three time world champion (2008, 2009 and 2010), she has also competed twice at the Olympics, finishing in 5th place both times.

== Early life and education ==
Martine Dugrenier was raised in the Saint-François neighborhood of Laval, Quebec. As a teenager, she competed in artistic gymnastics, hoping to get a scholarship to an American university, but was forced to stay in Quebec after sustaining a knee injury. She attended Vanier College, where she was introduced to wrestling as it was the only physical education class that could fit in her schedule. She was initially reluctant when her wrestling coach recommended that she switch from artistic gymnastics to wrestling, but eventually made the switch two years later. After graduating from Vanier College in 1999, she attended Concordia University, where she competed for the Concordia Stingers wrestling team where she came in third in her first year at the University Canadian Championships and fifth in her second year while being named Concordia's Female Athlete of the Year every year from 2002 to 2004. She won gold medals in each of her last three championships; during her senior season in 2004, she was named the outstanding female wrestler in Canadian university sports after winning gold without conceding a point in the 2004 competition. She graduated from Concordia with a BSc specialization in Athletic Therapy and a Graduate Diploma in Sports Administration. In 2019, she was inducted into the Concordia University Sports Hall of Fame as an athlete.

== Career ==
She is an eight-time Canadian National Champion, winning her last in 2011. From 2005 to 2007, she won three consecutive silver medals in the 67-kilogram weight class at the World Wrestling Championships. At the 2008 Summer Olympics, she finished 5th overall in the 63 kg freestyle event, winning her first match against Marianna Sastin of Hungary and her quarterfinal match against Xu Haiyan of China, before losing to eventual gold medalist Kaori Icho from Japan. Qualifying for the repechage, she lost her bronze medal final match against American wrestler Randi Miller. As the 67-kilogram weight class did not yet exist in the Olympics at the time, she had to compete in the 63-kilogram weight class. Six weeks after the Olympics, she won the first of three consecutive gold medals at the World Championships from 2008 to 2010 in the 67-kilogram weight class.

She again competed in the 63-kilogram division at the 2012 Summer Olympics; her fifth position came after losing her bronze medal match to Battsetseg Soronzonbold of Mongolia in the bronze medal final, having previously lost her first match against again-eventual gold medalist Kaori Icho of Japan, and winning her subsequent repechage round two match against Henna Johansson of Sweden. This became the final match of her career, as she announced her retirement from wrestling in May 2015 after three years of inactivity due to an arm injury. She was inducted into the United World Wrestling Hall of Fame in 2016. She currently works as a physical education teacher at Vanier College, having begun working as such in 2009. She was inducted into the YM-YWHA Montreal Jewish Sports Hall of Fame in 2019.
