= Eun-kyung =

- Hangul: 은경
- RR: Eungyeong
- MR: Ŭn'gyŏng
- IPA: [ɯnɡjʌŋ]

Eun-kyung, also spelled Eun-kyeong, or Eun-kyong, Eun-gyoung, Un-kyong, Un-gyong, is a Korean given name. In 1970, Eun-kyung was the 5th-most popular name for baby girls born in South Korea, falling to 8th place by 1980.

People with this name include:

== Entertainers ==
- Kang Eun-kyung (born 1971), South Korean television screenwriter
- Shin Eun-kyung (born 1973), South Korean actress
- Lim Eun-kyung (born 1984), South Korean actress
- Shim Eun-kyung (born 1994), South Korean actress

== Sportspeople ==
- Chang Eun-kyung (1951–1996), South Korean judo practitioner
- Lee Eun-kyung (volleyball) (born 1961), South Korean volleyball player
- Chung Eun-kyung (born 1965), South Korean field hockey player
- Choi Eun-kyung (field hockey) (born 1971), South Korean field hockey player
- Lee Eun-kyung (archer) (born 1972), South Korean archer
- Lee Eun-kyung (field hockey) (born 1972), South Korean field hockey player
- Park Eun-kyung (field hockey) (born 1975), South Korean field hockey player
- Ri Un-gyong (born 1980), North Korean football midfielder
- Choi Eun-kyung (born 1984), South Korean short track speed skater
- Choe Un-gyong (wrestler) (born 1991), North Korean freestyle wrestler
- Kim Eun-kyeong (born 1991), South Korean handball player
- Choe Un-gyong (diver) (born 1994), North Korean diver

== See also ==
- List of Korean given names
