= Xiluo Zhuoma =

Chinese freestyle wrestler

Personal information
- Citizenship: China
- Born: 24 October 1987 (age 38)
- Height: 167 cm (5 ft 6 in)
- Weight: 65 kg (143 lb; 10 st 3 lb)

Sport
- Country: China
- Sport: Amateur wrestling
- Event: Freestyle
Medal record
Women's freestyle wrestling
Representing China
World Championships
| Gold medal – first place | 2011 Istanbul | 67 kg |
| Bronze medal – third place | 2012 Strathcona County | 63 kg |
Asian Games
| Silver medal – second place | 2014 Incheon | 63 kg |
Asian Championships
| Gold medal – first place | 2015 Doha | 63 kg |
| Gold medal – first place | 2013 New Delhi | 63 kg |

Shelok Dolma also called Xi Luozhuoma or Xiluo Zhuo Ma (born October 24, 1987) is a Tibetan female wrestler from China.

== Biography ==
Dolma was born in the Tibetan region of Nyingrtri in Kongpo. She first started wrestling for China in 2010 where she participated in the World Wrestling competition in Turkey. In 2011, she won the gold medal for women's freestyle wrestling in the 67 kg class. This marked the first time a Tibetan woman won the international wrestling gold medal. Six months prior to her win in Turkey, she won the silver medal at the National Wrestling Championship. Her win in 2011 qualified her for the 2012 London Olympics.

While at Beijing Sport University, she was awarded "Chinese College Student of the Year 2012."

In 2013, she won the gold medal in Shenyang city for the 63 kg wrestling event at the 12th National Games of China.

Dolma won a gold medal again at the Asian Wrestling Championships in 2015 which took place at the Aspire Dome in Doha, Qatar.
