= Jing Ruixue =

Chinese wrestler (born 1988)

Personal information
- Born: July 4, 1988 (age 38) Xi'an, China
Medal record
Women's freestyle wrestling
Representing China
Olympic Games
Silver medal – second place	2012 London	63 kg
World Championships
Gold medal – first place	2006 Guangzhou	67 kg
Gold medal – first place	2007 Baku	67 kg
Silver medal – second place	2005 Budapest	63 kg
Bronze medal – third place	2011 Istanbul	63 kg
Asian Championships
Gold medal – first place	2005 Wuhan	67 kg

Jing Ruixue (景瑞雪, Jǐng Ruìxuě, born July 4, 1988, in Xi'an) is a female wrestler from China.

She won the silver medal at the 2012 Summer Olympics in the women's 63 kg category. She beat Choe Un-Gyong, Monika Michalik and Lyubov Volosova before losing in the final to defending champion Kaori Icho.

== See also ==
- China at the 2012 Summer Olympics
