= Wrestling at the 2010 Commonwealth Games – Women's freestyle 63 kg =

Women's freestyle 63 kg competition at the 2010 Commonwealth Games in New Delhi, India, was held on 7 October at the Indira Gandhi Arena.

== Medalists ==
Gold	Justine Bouchard; Canada
Silver	Blessing Oborududu; Nigeria
Bronze	Suman Kundu; India

=== Bracket ===
Preliminary
Marie Anne Milazar (MRI)	0	0	0
Geringer Zumicke (RSA)	3	0	0

Quarterfinals
Louise Randle (AUS)	0	0	0
Blessing Oborududu (NGR)	5	0	0
Tracy Connell (SCO)	0	0	0
Suman Kundu (IND)	0	0	0
Leah Ndungu (KEN)	1	1	2
Kate Rennie (WAL)	0	2	0
Justine Bouchard (CAN)	4	0	0
Zumicke Geringer (RSA)	0	0

Semifinals
Blessing Oborududu (NGR)	3	1	0
Suman Kundu (IND)	0	0	0
Leah Ndungu (KEN)	0	0	0
Justine Bouchard (CAN)	4	0	0

Final
Blessing Oborududu (NGR)	1	1	0
Justine Bouchard (CAN)	0	3	3

=== Repechage ===
Quarterfinals	Semifinals				Bronze Medal Bout
	Louise Randle (AUS)	0	0	0
	Suman Kundu (IND)	6	0	0
					Suman Kundu (IND)	4	2	3
					Zumicke Geringer (RSA)	0	2	0
	Zumicke Geringer (RSA)	3	2	0
	Leah Ndungu (KEN)	0	0	0
