= Banzragchiin Oyuunsüren =

Mongolian wrestler (born 1989)

Personal information
- Native name: Банзрагчийн Оюунсүрэн
- Nationality: Mongolia
- Born: November 6, 1989 (age 36)
- Height: 166 cm (5 ft 5 in)

Sport
- Country: Mongolia
- Sport: Wrestling
- Weight class: 67 kg
- Event: Freestyle
Medal record
Women's freestyle wrestling
Representing Mongolia
World Championships
Silver medal – second place	2011 Istanbul	67 kg
Asian Championships
Silver medal – second place	2010 New Delhi	67 kg
Golden Grand Prix Ivan Yarygin
Bronze medal – third place	2010 Krasnoyarsk	67 kg
World University Championships
Bronze medal – third place	2010 Turin	67 kg

Banzragchiin Oyuunsuren (Mongolian: Банзрагчийн Оюунсүрэн; born November 6, 1989) is a female wrestler from Mongolia.
