= Haiat Farag =

Egyptian freestyle wrestler

Personal information
- Full name: Haiat Farag Youssef Mohamed Youssef
- Nationality: Egypt
- Born: 18 February 1987 (age 39)
- Height: 1.53 m (5 ft 0 in)
- Weight: 63 kg (139 lb)

Sport
- Sport: Wrestling
- Event: Freestyle

Haiat Farag (Arabic: حياة فرج; born February 18, 1987) is an amateur Egyptian freestyle wrestler, who played for the women's middleweight category. Farag represented Egypt at the 2008 Summer Olympics in Beijing, where she competed for the women's 63 kg class. She was quickly pinned in the first preliminary round by American wrestler Randi Miller, at about forty seconds.
