= Irene García =

Spanish politician (born 1980)

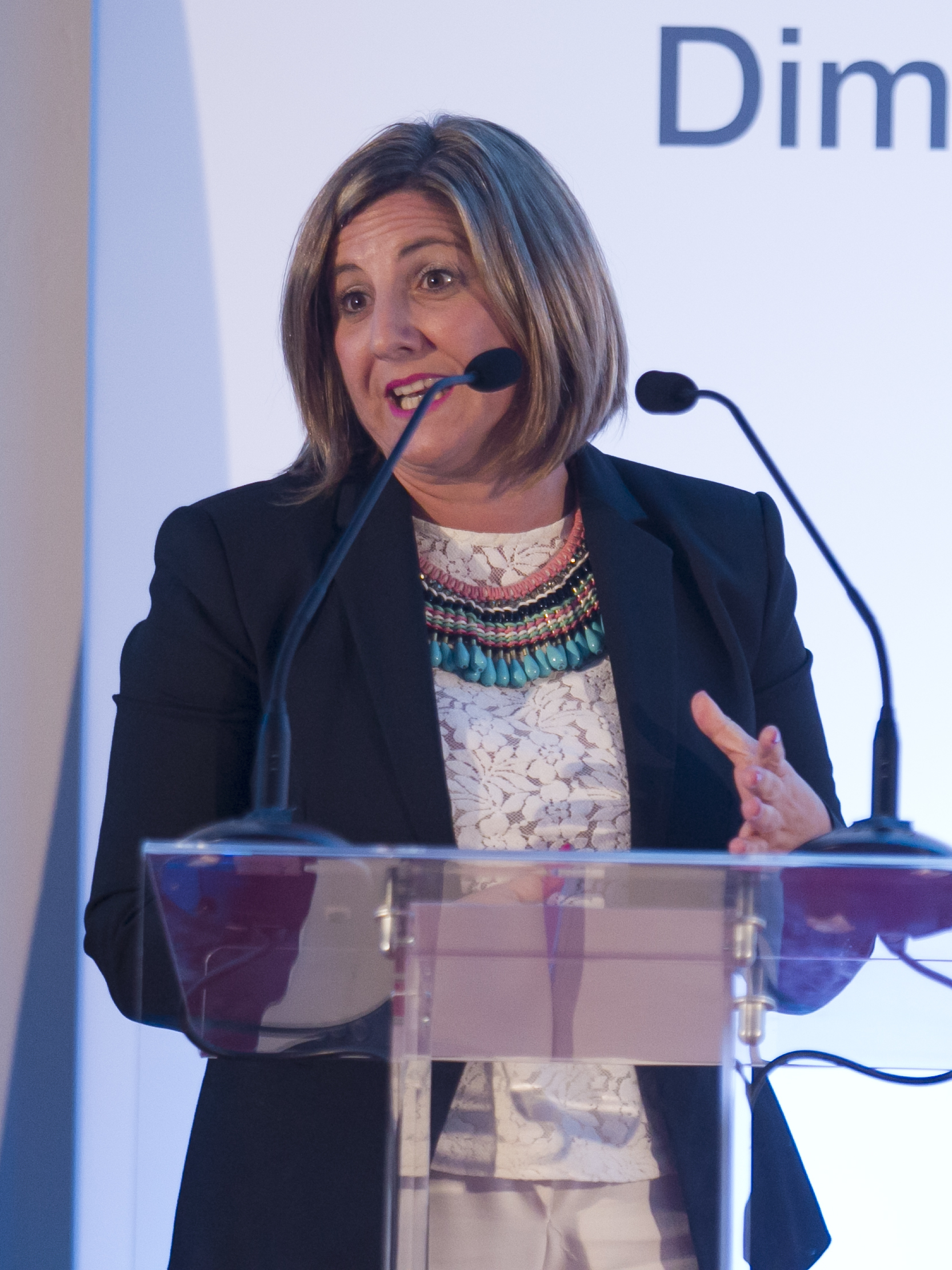
- García in 2015

Second Vice President of the Parliament of Andalusia
- Incumbent
- Assumed office 14 July 2022
- President: Jesús Aguirre
- Preceded by: Teresa Jiménez Vílchez

Personal details
- Born: 8 March 1980 (age 46)
- Party: Spanish Socialist Workers' Party

Irene García Macías (born 8 March 1980) is a Spanish politician serving as vice president of the Parliament of Andalusia since 2022. From 2015 to 2022, she served as president of the provincial deputation of Cádiz. From 2007 to 2013, she served as mayor of Sanlúcar de Barrameda.
