= Irina Netreba =

Azerbaijani sport wrestler

Medal record

Women's freestyle wrestling

Representing Azerbaijan

World Championship
Bronze medal – third place	2018 Budapest	65 kg

European Championship
Silver medal – second place	2014 Vantaa	58 kg

Summer Universiade
Silver medal – second place	Kazan 2013	63 kg

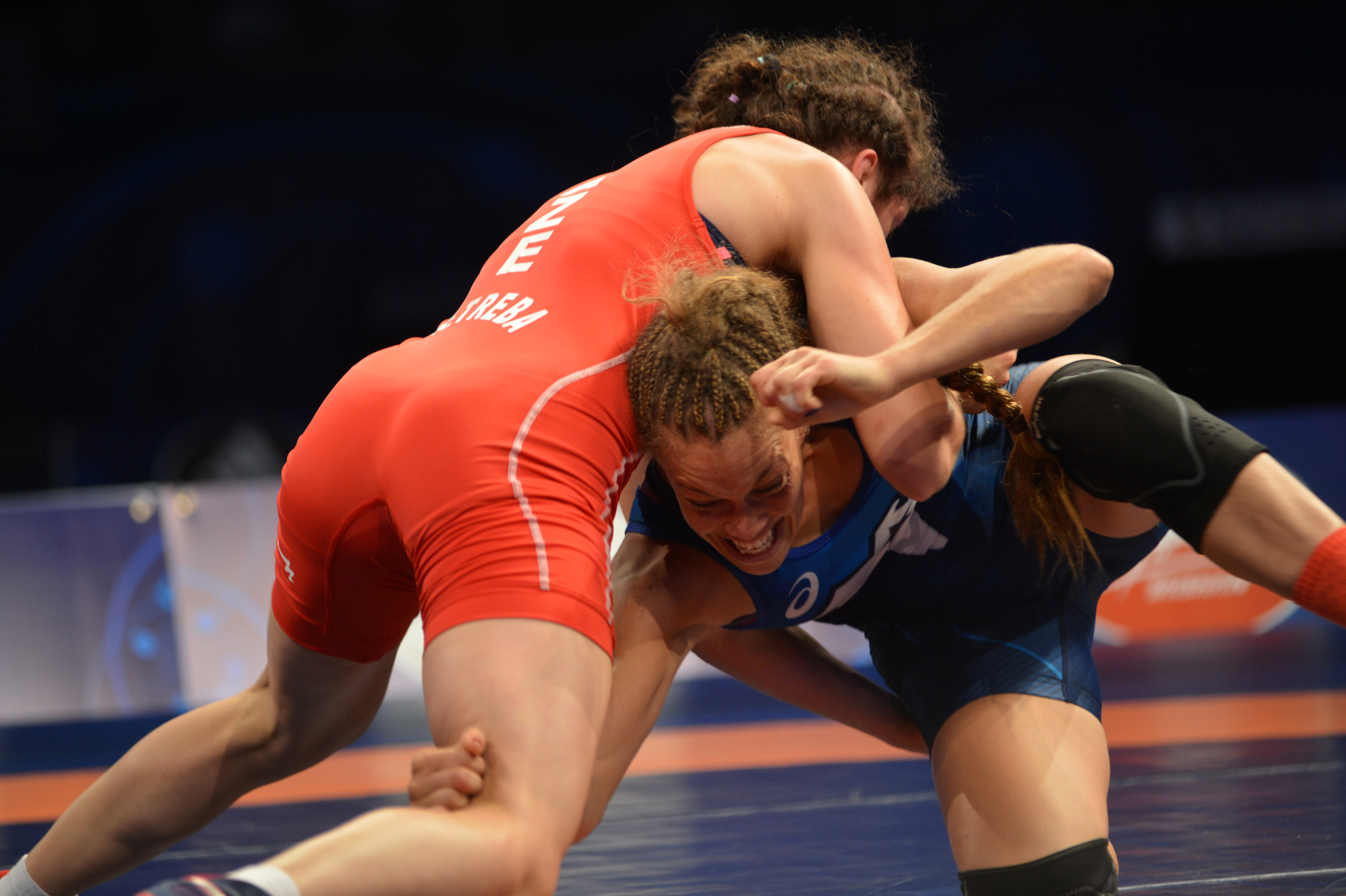
Irina Netreba (in red) against Leigh Jaynes

Irina Petrovna Netreba is an Azerbaijani female wrestler. She is a European vice-champion in freestyle wrestling.
