= Bayantsogt =

District in Töv, Mongolia

Coordinates: 48°07′33″N 105°48′43″E

Bayantsogt District Баянцогт сум ᠪᠠᠶ᠋ᠠᠨᠴᠣᠭᠲᠤᠰᠤᠮᠤ
- District
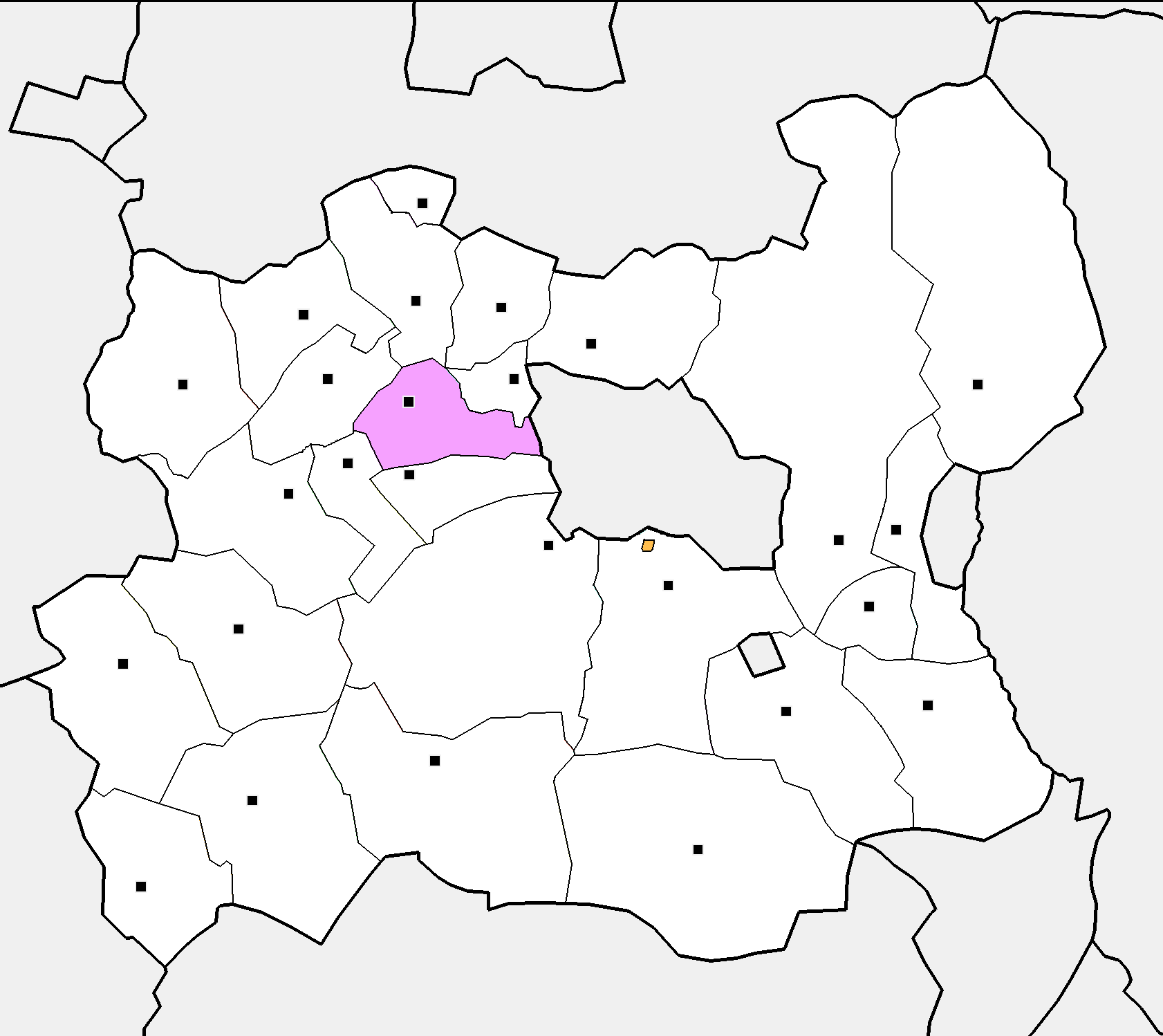
- Country: Mongolia
- Province: Töv Province
- Time zone: UTC+8 (UTC + 8)

Bayantsogt (Баянцогт [pái̯ˑnt͡sɞχtʰ]), also called Dund-Urt (Дунд-Урт [tʊ́nt‿ʊ́r̥tʰ]), is a sum of Töv Province in Mongolia.

== Geography ==
The district has a total area of 1,500 km^{2}.

== Administrative divisions ==
The district is divided into three bags, which are:

- Dargiat
- Guna
- Sarlag
