= Elina Vaseva =

Bulgarian freestyle wrestler

Personal information
- Nationality: Bulgaria
- Born: 21 August 1986 (age 39) Kyustendil, Bulgaria
- Height: 1.67 m (5 ft 5 1/2 in)
- Weight: 63 kg (139 lb)

Sport
- Sport: Wrestling
- Event: Freestyle
- Club: Yunak-Lokomotiv Ruse
- Coached by: Simeon Shterev
Medal record
Women's freestyle wrestling
Representing Bulgaria
European Championships
| Bronze medal – third place | 2010 Baku | 63 kg |

Elina Vaseva (Bulgarian: Елина Васева; born 21 August 1986, in Kyustendil) is an amateur Bulgarian freestyle wrestler, who played for the women's middleweight category. She won the bronze medal for her division at the 2010 European Wrestling Championships in Baku, Azerbaijan. She is also a member of Yunak-Lokomotiv Wrestling Club in Ruse, and is coached and trained by Simeon Shterev.

Vaseva represented Bulgaria at the 2008 Summer Olympics in Beijing, where she competed for the women's 63 kg class. She pinned Guam's Maria Dunn in the preliminary round of sixteen, before losing out the quarterfinal match to Russia's Alena Kartashova, with a two-set technical score (0–6, 1–2), and a classification point score of 1–3. Because her opponent advanced further into the final match, Vaseva was offered another shot for the bronze medal by entering the repechage bouts. She was defeated in the first round by Kazakhstan's Yelena Shalygina, who was able to score five points each in two straight periods, leaving Vaseva without a single point.
