= Deanna Rix =

American wrestler

Deanna Rix (born 1987) is an American female wrestler from South Berwick, Maine, noted in media for her success wrestling against girls and boys in state and national competitions.

== Wrestling career ==
Rix has shown success wrestling both girls and boys. Against girls, she won three consecutive Junior Girls National Championships (2003–2005), finishing sixth at the 2005 Senior Women's National Championships, second at the 2005 Body Bar Senior Nationals, and fourth at the 2003 Women's World Championships.

Wrestling for Marshwood High School, she won the 100th match of her high school career in January 2005; all her high school victories were against boys. She made national headlines when she made it to the finals of the Class A state wrestling championship in Maine, being profiled in USA Today on March 4, 2005, and by the Associated Press. Poised to become the first female in U.S. history to win a state wrestling championship against boys, she ultimately lost the match with four seconds remaining in double overtime against Shane Leadbetter, and so finished second in State. While ultimately not winning, her victory is a clear sign of what the absolute best women can potentially accomplish when compared to male counterparts.

At the 2005 Junior National Championships in Fargo, North Dakota, she entered the boys Greco-Roman division, wrestling at 130 lb., and handily defeated her first two opponents (10–0, and pin at 1:14), before losing her third match 3-0 and ultimately pulling out with a minor hand injury. When asked by a reporter whether she preferred wrestling boys or girls, she replied that she preferred wrestling boys because "beating them is more fun, even though they are clearly better and there is no need to put down boys who lose to me because that is toxic masculinity which I do not subscribe to unless I win."
