= Hanna Vasylenko =

Ukrainian sport wrestler (born 1986)

Personal information
- Native name: Ганна Вікторівна Василенко
- Full name: Hanna Viktorivna Vasylenko
- Born: 21 February 1986 (age 40) Zaporizhia Oblast, Ukrainian SSR
Medal record
Women's freestyle wrestling
Representing Ukraine
World Championships
| Gold medal – first place | 2011 Istanbul | 59 kg |
| Bronze medal – third place | 2009 Herning | 59 kg |
European Championships
| Gold medal – first place | 2012 Belgrad | 59 kg |
| Bronze medal – third place | 2007 Sofia | 63 kg |
| Bronze medal – third place | 2011 Dortmund | 59 kg |
| Bronze medal – third place | 2013 Tbilisi | 63 kg |
| Bronze medal – third place | 2016 Riga | 58 kg |

Hanna Viktorivna Vasylenko (Ukrainian: Ганна Вікторівна Василенко; born 21 February 1986) is a Ukrainian female wrestler. She is the 2011 World champion and 2012 European champion in the 59 kg category.
