= Justine Bouchard =

Canadian freestyle wrestler

Personal information
- Born: January 12, 1986 (age 40) Wetaskiwin, Alberta, Canada
- Height: 159 cm (5 ft 3 in)
- Weight: 65 kg (143 lb)

Sport
- Country: Canada
- Sport: Wrestling
Medal record
Women's freestyle wrestling
Representing Canada
World Championships
Bronze medal – third place	2012 Strathcona County	63 kg
Bronze medal – third place	2009 Herning	63 kg
Commonwealth Games
Gold medal – first place	2010 Delhi	63 kg

Justine Bouchard (born January 12, 1986) is a Canadian freestyle wrestler from Calgary, Alberta. Bouchard won a gold medal at the 2010 Commonwealth Games.
