= Choe Un-gyong (wrestler) =

North Korean freestyle wrestler

Choe Un-gyong (최은경, born 29 July 1990 in South Hamgyong Province) is a North Korean freestyle wrestler. She competed in the freestyle 63 kg event at the 2012 Summer Olympics; she was defeated by Jing Ruixue in the 1/8 finals and eliminated by Monika Michalik in the repechage round.
