= Marianna Sastin =

Hungarian wrestler (born 1983)

Personal information
- National team: Hungary
- Born: 10 July 1983 (age 43) Mosonmagyaróvár, Hungary
- Height: 5 ft 3 in (160 cm)
- Weight: 143 lb (65 kg)

Sport
- Country: Hungary
- Sport: Wrestling
- Weight class: Women Middleweight 63kg
- Event: Freestyle
- Club: Delta SE Mosonmagyaróvár; Csepeli BC (2003–10); Vasas SC (2010–)
- Coached by: Zoltán Gulyás (2004–2008), Zsolt Bánkúti (2008– ), Ákos Wöller (2010– )
Medal record
Women's freestyle wrestling
Representing Hungary
World Championships
Gold medal – first place	2013 Budapest	59 kg
Silver medal – second place	2005 Budapest	59 kg
Silver medal – second place	2011 Istanbul	63 kg
Bronze medal – third place	2009 Herning	59 kg
European Games
Gold medal – first place	2015 Baku	60 kg
European Championships
Silver medal – second place	2007 Sofia	59 kg
Silver medal – second place	2021 Warsaw	62 kg
Bronze medal – third place	2006 Moscow	59 kg
Bronze medal – third place	2008 Tampere	63 kg
Bronze medal – third place	2010 Baku	59 kg
Bronze medal – third place	2019 Bucharest	62 kg
- Updated on 9 August 2016

Marianna Sastin (born 10 July 1983) is a Hungarian female wrestler. She has wrestled competitively with Csepeli BC and competed in the Beijing Olympics in 2008 and the London Olympics in 2012, where she placed 15th and 11th, respectively. She competed in the 63 kg women's freestyle event at the 2016 Summer Olympics in Rio de Janeiro Olympics.

== Major results ==
Year	Tournament	Venue	Result	Event
2001	European Championships	Budapest, Hungary	12th	Freestyle 56 kg
2003	World Championships	New York, United States	4th	Freestyle 59 kg
2005	European Championships	Varna, Bulgaria	7th	Freestyle 59 kg
2005	World Championships	Budapest, Hungary	2nd	Freestyle 59 kg
2006	European Championships	Moscow, Russia	3rd	Freestyle 59 kg
2006	World Championships	Guangzhou, China	5th	Freestyle 59 kg
2007	European Championships	Sofia, Bulgaria	2nd	Freestyle 59 kg
2007	World Championships	Baku, Azerbaijan	13th	Freestyle 63 kg
2008	European Championships	Tampere, Finland	3rd	Freestyle 63 kg
2008	Olympic Games	Beijing, China	15th	Freestyle 63 kg
2008	World Championships	Tokyo, Japan	9th	Freestyle 59 kg
2009	World Championships	Herning, Denmark	3rd	Freestyle 59 kg
2010	European Championships	Baku, Azerbaijan	3rd	Freestyle 59 kg
2010	World Championships	Moscow, Russia	5th	Freestyle 63 kg
2011	European Championships	Dortmund, Germany	5th	Freestyle 63 kg
2011	World Championships	Istanbul, Turkey	2nd	Freestyle 63 kg
2012	Olympic Games	London, United Kingdom	11th	Freestyle 63 kg
2013	World Championships	Budapest, Hungary	1st	Freestyle 59 kg
2014	European Championships	Vantaa, Finland	7th	Freestyle 58 kg
2014	World Championships	Tashkent, Uzbekistan	11th	Freestyle 60 kg
2015	European Games	Baku, Azerbaijan	1st	Freestyle 60 kg
2015	World Championships	Las Vegas, United States	8th	Freestyle 58 kg
2016	European Championships	Riga, Latvia	3rd	Freestyle 63 kg
2016	Olympic Games	Rio de Janeiro, Brazil	17th	Freestyle 63 kg
2018	World Championships	Budapest, Hungary	5th	Freestyle 62 kg
2019	European Championships	Bucharest, Romania	3rd	Freestyle 62 kg
2021	European Championships	Warsaw, Poland	2nd	Freestyle 62 kg
