= Elvira Mursalova =

Azerbaijani wrestler

Personal information
- Nationality: Russia
- Citizenship: Azerbaijani
- Born: 25 October 1982 (age 43) Kaspiysk
- Height: 164
- Weight: 62

Sport
- Sport: Freestyle wrestling
- Club: Atasport (Baku)

Elvira Mursalova is a Russian and Azerbaijani athlete, freestyle wrestler. Bronze medalist of the World Championship, silver medalist of the European Championship. She performed in the weight class up to 59 kg.

== Biography ==
She was born in 1982 in Kaspiysk (Dagestan, Russia). By nationality, she is a Lezgian.

I went to karate-do from the age of seven. She started wrestling at the age of 12. A pupil of the Dynamo Sports School, trained with Kurban Kurbanov. Since 2006, he has been living in Baku and playing for the Azerbaijani national team.

In January 2007, at the VI International Women's Wrestling Grand Prix Tournament "Ivan Yarygin", which was held in Krasnoyarsk, Mursalova became the third in the weight category up to 59 kg.

In April 2008, at the European Wrestling Championship held in Tampere, Finland, Elvira Mursalova (59 kg) won a silver medal in the weight category up to 59 kg. On the way to the final, Mursalova defeated Poland's Agata Petrzyk, Ukraine's Natalia Sinishina and Tatiana Bohan. In the decisive match, Elvira lost to Teresa Ida Nerel (Sweden) with a score of 1:4. Elvira's medal can be called historical, since no Azerbaijani athlete has ever won the European Wrestling Championship awards before. According to the athlete, she was let down by excessive confidence, since 25 days before Mursalova had won a Swedish woman at an international tournament in Kyiv.

In October 2008, at the World Championships in Tokyo, Elvira Mursalova won one bronze medal in the weight category up to 59 kg. Mursalova began her tournament career with a victory over Joyce Silva (Brazil), after which she defeated Alla Cherkasova (Ukraine). However, in the semifinals, Elvira lost to the future winner of the competition, Ayako Shiuda. In the dispute for the third place, Mursalova won Diana Rix (USA) and secured the bronze award.

== Progress ==
=== For Russia ===
- Cadet World Championship — 1st place (1998);
- European Junior Championship — 3rd place (2002);

=== For Azerbaijan ===
- European Championship — 2nd place (2008, Tampere);
- Golden Grand Prix — 3rd place (2008);
- World Championship — 3rd place (2008, Tokyo);
- Golden Grand Prix — 3rd place (2009).
