= Ayako Shōda =

Japanese sport wrestler (born 1981)

Medal record

Women's freestyle wrestling

Representing Japan

World Championships
Gold medal – first place	1999 Boden	62 kg
Gold medal – first place	2005 Budapest	59 kg
Gold medal – first place	2006 Guangzhou	59 kg
Gold medal – first place	2008 Tokyo	59 kg
Bronze medal – third place	2010 Moscow	59 kg

Asian Championships
Gold medal – first place	2000 Seoul	62 kg
Gold medal – first place	2001 Ulan Bator	62 kg
Gold medal – first place	2003 New Delhi	63 kg
Gold medal – first place	2006 Alma-Ata	63 kg

Summer Universiade
Gold medal – first place	2005 İzmir	59 kg

Ayako Shoda (正田 絢子 Shōda Ayako, born November 3, 1981) is a Japanese freestyle wrestler and four-time World Wrestling Champion.

== Awards ==
- Tokyo Sports
  - Wrestling Special Award (1999, 2005)
