= Olesya Zamula =

Azerbaijani freestyle wrestler

Personal information
- Nationality: Azerbaijan
- Born: 17 February 1984 (age 42) Riga, Latvian SSR
- Height: 1.63 m (5 ft 4 in)
- Weight: 63 kg (139 lb)

Sport
- Sport: Wrestling
- Event: Freestyle
- Club: Atasport Baku (AZE)
- Coached by: Semjon Kapitannikov (AZE)
Medal record
Women's freestyle wrestling
Representing Azerbaijan
European Championships
Silver medal – second place	2011 Dortmund	63 kg

Olesya Zamula (born February 17, 1984, in Riga, Latvian SSR) is an amateur Azerbaijani wrestler, who competed in the women's middleweight category. She won the bronze medal for her division at the 2011 European Wrestling Championships in Dortmund, Germany. She is also a member of Atasport Wrestling Club in Baku, and is coached and trained by Semjon Kapitannikov.

Zamula represented her current nation Azerbaijan at the 2008 Summer Olympics in Beijing, where she competed for the women's 63 kg. She received a bye for the second preliminary match, before losing out by a technical fall to Japan's Kaori Icho. Because her opponent advanced further into the final match, Zamula was offered another shot for the bronze medal by entering the repechage bouts. She was pinned in the second period by American wrestler Randi Miller, who eventually won the bronze medal in this event.
