= Badrakhyn Odonchimeg =

Mongolian freestyle wrestler (born 1981)

Badrakh Odonchimeg
Personal information
- Native name: Бадрахын Одончимэг
- Nationality: Mongolia
- Born: 12 October 1981 (age 44) Bayantsogt, Töv, Mongolia
- Height: 1.75 m (5 ft 9 in)

Sport
- Country: Mongolia
- Sport: Wrestling
- Weight class: 63-75 kg
- Event: Freestyle
- Club: Aldar
Medal record
Women's freestyle wrestling
Representing Mongolia
World Championships
Bronze medal – third place	2009 Herning	67 kg
World Cup
Silver medal – second place	2013 Mongolia	72 kg
Silver medal – second place	2010 Nanjing	67 kg
Asian Games
Bronze medal – third place	2006 Doha	63 kg
Asian Championships
Silver medal – second place	2008 Jeju City	63 kg
Silver medal – second place	2012 Gumi	72 kg
Silver medal – second place	2013 New Delhi	72 kg
Silver medal – second place	2015 Doha	75 kg
Bronze medal – third place	2007 Bishkek	63 kg
Bronze medal – third place	2009 Pattaya	67 kg
Bronze medal – third place	2011 Tashkent	72 kg
Golden Grand Prix Ivan Yarygin
Gold medal – first place	2016 Krasnoyarsk	75 kg
Silver medal – second place	2010 Krasnoyarsk	67 kg
World Military Championships
Bronze medal – third place	2018 Moscow	76 kg
World University Championships
Silver medal – second place	2006 Ulaanbaatar	63 kg

Badrakh Odonchimeg (Mongolian: Бадрахын Одончимэг; born 12 October 1981 in Bayantsogt sum, Töv aimag) is an amateur Mongolian freestyle wrestler, who played for the women's middleweight category. Between 2007 and 2012, Odonchimeg had won a total of seven medals (four silver and three bronze) for the 63, 67, and 72 kg classes at the Asian Wrestling Championships. She also captured two bronze medals in the same division at the 2006 Asian Games in Doha, Qatar, and at the 2009 World Wrestling Championships in Herning, Denmark.

Odonchimeg represented Mongolia at the 2008 Summer Olympics in Beijing, where she competed for the women's 63 kg class. She received a bye for the preliminary round of sixteen match, before losing out to China's Xu Haiyan, with a two-set technical score (3–5, 0–4), and a classification point score of 1–3.
