= Alena Kartashova =

Russian wrestler (born 1982)

Personal information
- Born: January 23, 1982 (age 44) Angarsk, Russia
Medal record
Women's freestyle wrestling
Representing Russia
Olympic Games
Silver medal – second place	2008 Beijing	63 kg

Alena Vladimirovna Kartashova (born January 23, 1982) is a wrestler from Russia. She won a silver medal in the women's freestyle 63 kg at the 2008 Summer Olympics.
