= Ifeoma Iheanacho =

Nigerian wrestler (born 1988)

Personal information
- Born: 2 January 1988 (age 38)
Medal record
Women's wrestling
Representing Nigeria
World Championships
Bronze medal – third place	2009 Herning	67 kg
Bronze medal – third place	2010 Moscow	67 kg

Ifeoma Iheanacho (born 2 January 1988) is a female wrestler from Nigeria. In January 2018, she appointed by the Nigeria Wrestling Federation (NWF) to coach and mentor the junior female team.
