= 2008 World Wrestling Championships =

- Host city: Tokyo, Japan
- Dates: 11–13 October 2008
- Stadium: Yoyogi National Gymnasium

Champions
- Women: Japan

The 2008 Women's World Wrestling Championships were held at the Yoyogi National Gymnasium in Tokyo, Japan. The event took place from October 11 to October 13, 2008. The competition only featured wrestling in the Female Freestyle event. Traditionally, Wrestling World Championships are not held in Olympic years, but in 2008 a female championship was held because the 2008 Summer Olympics included only four of the seven FILA weight classes for women.

== Medal table ==
Rank	Nation	Gold	Silver	Bronze	Total
1	Japan	4	1	2	7
2	Canada	1	0	2	3
3	United States	1	0	1	2
4	Bulgaria	1	0	0	1
5	Russia	0	2	0	2
6	China	0	1	2	3
6	Ukraine	0	1	2	3
8	Belarus	0	1	0	1
8	Kazakhstan	0	1	0	1
10	France	0	0	2	2
11	Azerbaijan	0	0	1	1
11	Mongolia	0	0	1	1
11	Poland	0	0	1	1
Totals (13 entries)		7	7	14	28

== Team ranking ==
Rank	Women's freestyle	
Rank	Team	Points
1	Japan	65
2	Canada	42
3	Russia	40
4	United States	31
5	Ukraine	31
6	China	29
7	Mongolia	23
8	Belarus	18
9	France	17
10	Azerbaijan	14

== Medal summary ==
Event	Gold	Silver	Bronze
48 kg	Clarissa Chun; United States	Zhuldyz Eshimova; Kazakhstan	Makiko Sakamoto; Japan
48 kg	Clarissa Chun; United States	Zhuldyz Eshimova; Kazakhstan	Su Guibei; China
51 kg	Hitomi Sakamoto; Japan	Maryna Markevich; Belarus	Vanessa Boubryemm; France
51 kg	Hitomi Sakamoto; Japan	Maryna Markevich; Belarus	Yuliya Blahinya; Ukraine
55 kg	Saori Yoshida; Japan	Tetyana Lazareva; Ukraine	Brittanee Laverdure; Canada
55 kg	Saori Yoshida; Japan	Tetyana Lazareva; Ukraine	Tatiana Suarez; United States
59 kg	Ayako Shoda; Japan	Natalia Golts; Russia	Elvira Mursalova; Azerbaijan
59 kg	Ayako Shoda; Japan	Natalia Golts; Russia	Agata Pietrzyk; Poland
63 kg	Mio Nishimaki; Japan	Lubov Volosova; Russia	Meng Lili; China
63 kg	Mio Nishimaki; Japan	Lubov Volosova; Russia	Audrey Prieto; France
67 kg	Martine Dugrenier; Canada	Mami Shinkai; Japan	Kateryna Burmistrova; Ukraine
67 kg	Martine Dugrenier; Canada	Mami Shinkai; Japan	Ochirbatyn Nasanburmaa; Mongolia
72 kg	Stanka Zlateva; Bulgaria	Hong Yan; China	Kyoko Hamaguchi; Japan
72 kg	Stanka Zlateva; Bulgaria	Hong Yan; China	Ohenewa Akuffo; Canada

== Participating nations ==
139 competitors from 41 nations participated.

- Australia (1)
- Austria (4)
- Azerbaijan (3)
- Belarus (7)
- Brazil (1)
- Bulgaria (2)
- Cameroon (1)
- Canada (7)
- China (6)
- Chinese Taipei (5)
- Congo DR (1)
- Czech Republic (1)
- France (3)
- Great Britain (1)
- Greece (4)
- Guinea-Bissau (1)
- Hungary (1)
- India (7)
- Italy (4)
- Japan (7)
- Kazakhstan (4)
- Kyrgyzstan (3)
- Madagascar (1)
- Mexico (1)
- Moldova (2)
- Mongolia (7)
- Philippines (2)
- Poland (6)
- Puerto Rico (1)
- Romania (3)
- Russia (7)
- Senegal (1)
- Slovakia (1)
- South Korea (2)
- Switzerland (1)
- Turkey (5)
- Ukraine (7)
- United States (7)
- Uzbekistan (4)
- Venezuela (4)
- Vietnam (3)

== See also ==
- Wrestling at the 2008 Summer Olympics
