= Geetika Jakhar =

Indian wrestler (born 1985)

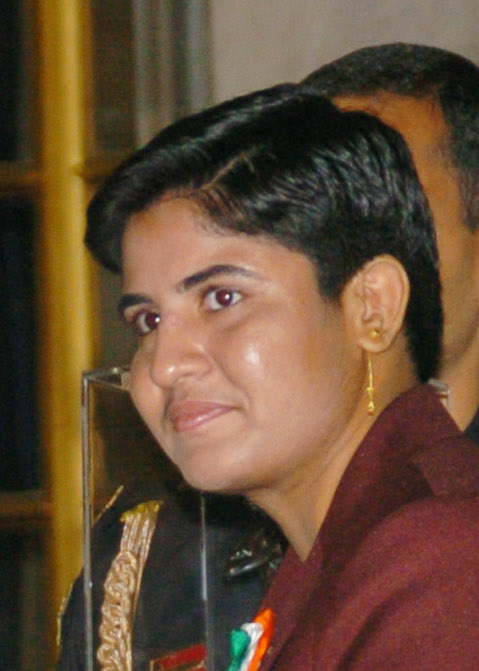
- Geetika Jakhar in August 2007

Personal information
- Nationality: Indian
- Born: Agroha, Haryana, India
- Height: 159 cm (5 ft 3 in)
- Weight: 63 kg

Sport
- Country: India
- Sport: Freestyle wrestling
- Event: 63 kg
Medal record
Women's freestyle wrestling
Representing India
Commonwealth Games
Silver medal – second place	2014 Glasgow	63 kg
Asian Games
Silver medal – second place	2006 Doha	63 kg
Bronze medal – third place	2014 Incheon	63 kg
Asian Wrestling Championships
Silver medal – second place	2003 Delhi	63 kg
Silver medal – second place	2005 Wuhan	63 kg
Bronze medal – third place	2013 Delhi	63 kg
Commonwealth Wrestling Championship
Gold medal – first place	2003 London	63 kg
Gold medal – first place	2005 Cape Town	63 kg
Silver medal – second place	2007 Ontario	63 kg
World Police and Fire Games
Silver medal – second place	2019 Chengdu	69 kg
World Junior Wrestling Championships
Silver medal – second place	2005 Vilnius	63 kg
Asian Junior Wrestling Championships
Gold medal – first place	2004 Almaty	67 kg
Silver medal – second place	2005 Jeju Island	63 kg

Geetika Jakhar (born 18 August 1985) is an Indian wrestler. Geetika comes from a family of sportspersons. She got Arjuna Award - 2006. She is the only women wrestler in the history of Indian sports to be judged the Best Wrestler of the 2005 Commonwealth Games and also who won medals at Asian Games 2006 and 2014 respectively. Geetika is the first woman wrestler being awarded with the Arjuna Award by Government of India in 2006. She is also a proud recipient of Bhim Award by government of Haryana. For her extraordinary achievements in the field of sports, the government of Haryana has appointed her to the post of Deputy Superintendent of Police in 2008.

== Personal life and family ==
Geetika's father Satyavir Singh Jakhar was the sports officer in Hisar, Haryana. She was inspired to take up wrestling by her grand father, Ch. Amar Chand Jakhar, an accomplished wrestler himself. She started wrestling at the age of 13, and was awarded the Bharat Kesari at the age of 15 by beating Sonika Kaliraman (daughter of renowned wrestler Chandgi Ram) the then bharat kesari in a Dangal held at New Delhi in 2000. She won the Bharat Kesari title for a consecutive 9 years from then on. She is married to Mr. Kamaldeep Singh Rana, who is working in Haryana public work department as an Executive Engineer.

== Early career ==
Geetika was actively participating in sports at a school level with her focus being athletics. But the turning point came when her family moved from her native village Agroha to Hisar to provide a better education for her younger brother and her. In an attempt to competitively pursue athletics, her father had taken her to the Mahabir Stadium in Hisar but they returned disappointed without finding any coach. During this she went to the nearby wrestling hall hearing huge voice coming from hall as coaches guide their ward from outside of the mat with a loud voice, young Geetika was drawn to other girls practicing wrestling. She immediately fell in love with the sport and from October 1998, she chose wrestling as her sport, leaving athletics. It took her four months after discovering wrestling when she represented Haryana at the 1999 National Games in Manipur and finished fourth.

She became the youngest wrestler to win a gold medal in all editions of the 2001 National Championships: Sub-Junior, Junior and Senior - a record that has yet to be broken. By this she completed her GOLDEN QUARTET.

=== 1999 ===
- Participated as youngest wrestler in National Games Imphal (Manipur) at the age of 13 in 56 kg women freestyle and stood fourth.
- Gold Medal at Haryana State Games held at Bhiwani; declared Best Women Wrestler of Haryana.

=== 2000 ===
- Gold Medal at Sub -Junior National championship, Talkatora Stadium, New Delhi.

=== 2001 ===
- Gold Medal at Sub -Junior National Championship.
- Gold Medal at Junior National Championship.
- Gold Medal at Senior National Championship, Nedani, Haryana
- Gold Medal at National Games, Ludhiana, Punjab

Completed Golden Quartet lone wrestler to do so.

== International career ==
Her international career began with her first appearance at the 2002 World Wrestling Championships in New York, USA.

=== 2002 ===
- Participated in World Championships, New York, USA where she reached to quarter-finals .
- Gold Medal at National Games, Hyderabad, Andhra Pradesh
- Gold Medal at Senior National Championship.

=== 2003 ===
- Participated in World Championships, ATHENS, GREECE where she reached quarterfinals.
- Silver Medal at Senior Asian Championship, New DelhiIndia.
- Gold Medal at Commonwealth Championship; LondonCanada.

=== 2005 ===
- Silver Medal at Senior Asian Championship, China.
- Gold Medal at Commonwealth Championship; declared best wrestler of the tournament, first Indian women wrestler to get "Best Wrestler of Commonwealth Games" title.
- Silver Medal at World Championships held at Lithuania.

=== 2006 ===
- Silver Medal at the Asian Games, Doha, Qatar biggest medal in wrestling at Asian games and 1st medal by Indian women wrestler.

=== 2007 ===
- Silver Medal at Commonwealth Championship, Ontario, Canada.
- Gold Medal at Senior National Championship.
- Gold Medal at National Games, Guwahati, Assam
- Participated in Senior Asian Championships, Bishkek, Kyrgyzstan

=== 2012 ===
- Gold Medal at Senior National Championship.

=== 2013 ===
- Bronze Medal at Senior Asian Championship, New Delhi, India

=== 2014 ===
- Silver Medal at the Commonwealth Games, Glasgow, Scotland.
- Bronze Medal at the Asian Games, Incheon, South Korea

== Awards and honours ==
- Bhim Award, 2003 - given to outstanding athletes from the state of Haryana, India
- Arjuna Award - 2006
- Kalpana Chawla Excellence award for Outstanding Women, 2009.
- Face of Beti Bachao Beti Padhao in Haryana.
- Brand Ambassador of Digital Cashless Week (20-27 Feb 2017) in Hisar, Haryana.

== See also ==
- Martine Dugrenier
