= María Teresa Méndez =

Spanish freestyle wrestler

Personal information
- Full name: María Teresa Méndez Mayo
- Nationality: Spain
- Born: 29 October 1982 (age 43) Madrid, Spain
- Height: 1.63 m (5 ft 4 in)
- Weight: 63 kg (139 lb)

Sport
- Sport: Wrestling
- Event: Freestyle
- Club: Altair
- Coached by: Francisco Barcia
Medal record
Women's freestyle wrestling
Representing Spain
European Championships
Bronze medal – third place	2005 Varna	55 kg

María Teresa Méndez Mayo (born October 29, 1982) is an amateur Spanish wrestler, who played for the women's middleweight category. She won the bronze medal at the 2005 European Wrestling Championships in Varna, Bulgaria, and also, achieved a fifth-place finish at the 2006 World Wrestling Championships in Guangzhou, China.

Mendez qualified for the women's 63 kg class at the 2008 Summer Olympics in Beijing, after winning the silver medal from the Olympic Qualification Tournament in Edmonton, Alberta, Canada, losing out to Belarus' Volha Khilko. She lost the second preliminary match to France's Lise Golliot-Legrand, who was able to score a total of three points at the end of the second period.
