= Karine Shadoyan =

Armenian freestyle wrestler

Personal information
- Born: 4 March 1975 (age 51) Kislovodsk, Stavropol Krai, Russia
- Height: 1.70 m (5 ft 7 in)
- Weight: 71 kg (157 lb)

Sport
- Sport: Wrestling
- Event: Freestyle
- Coached by: Araik Baghdadyan
Medal record
Women's freestyle wrestling
Representing Armenia
European Championships
| Bronze medal – third place | 2006 Moscow | 72 kg |

Karine Shadoyan (Armenian: Կարինե Շադոյան, born 4 March 1975) is a Russian-born Armenian Freestyle female wrestler.

== Biography ==
She was born 4 March 4, 1975 in Kislovodsk, Stavropol Krai. Her family on her grandmother's side is from Yerevan, Armenia.

Currently resides in Makhachkala. Karina is involved in the development of women's wrestling in Dagestan, where she coaches several prominent athletes such as Daniella and Millena Vinogradova.

She is the personal coach of the Russian champion Ksenia Burakova.

=== Sport career ===
She started her sports career with swimming and athletics. She trained for the rest of high school. Her coach suggested that she take up freestyle wrestling, but she did not take his suggestion seriously. At one point she gave up the sport and didn't practice at all, but thanks to the persistence of her coach, who kept trying to get her back into the sport for seven years, she realised it was something she wanted to do. That's how she came to freestyle wrestling.

At the age of 22 she began to seriously compete in freestyle wrestling, where she achieved the title of Master of Sports of Russia. She played for the national team of Uzbekistan until 2004, then moved to the national team of Armenia, where she won a bronze medal at the 2006 European Wrestling Championships. She is the first female wrestler from Armenia to win a medal at the European Wrestling Championships.

== Achievements ==
| Tournament | Results |
|---|---|
| 2004 Asian Wrestling Championships | 5th place |
| 2006 European Wrestling Championships | Bronze medal |
| 2006 World Wrestling Championships | 7th place |
| 2007 Dan Kolov-Nikola Petrov | Bronze medal |
| 2011 Kiev International Tournament | Bronze medal |
