= Yelena Shalygina =

Kazakhstani sport wrestler

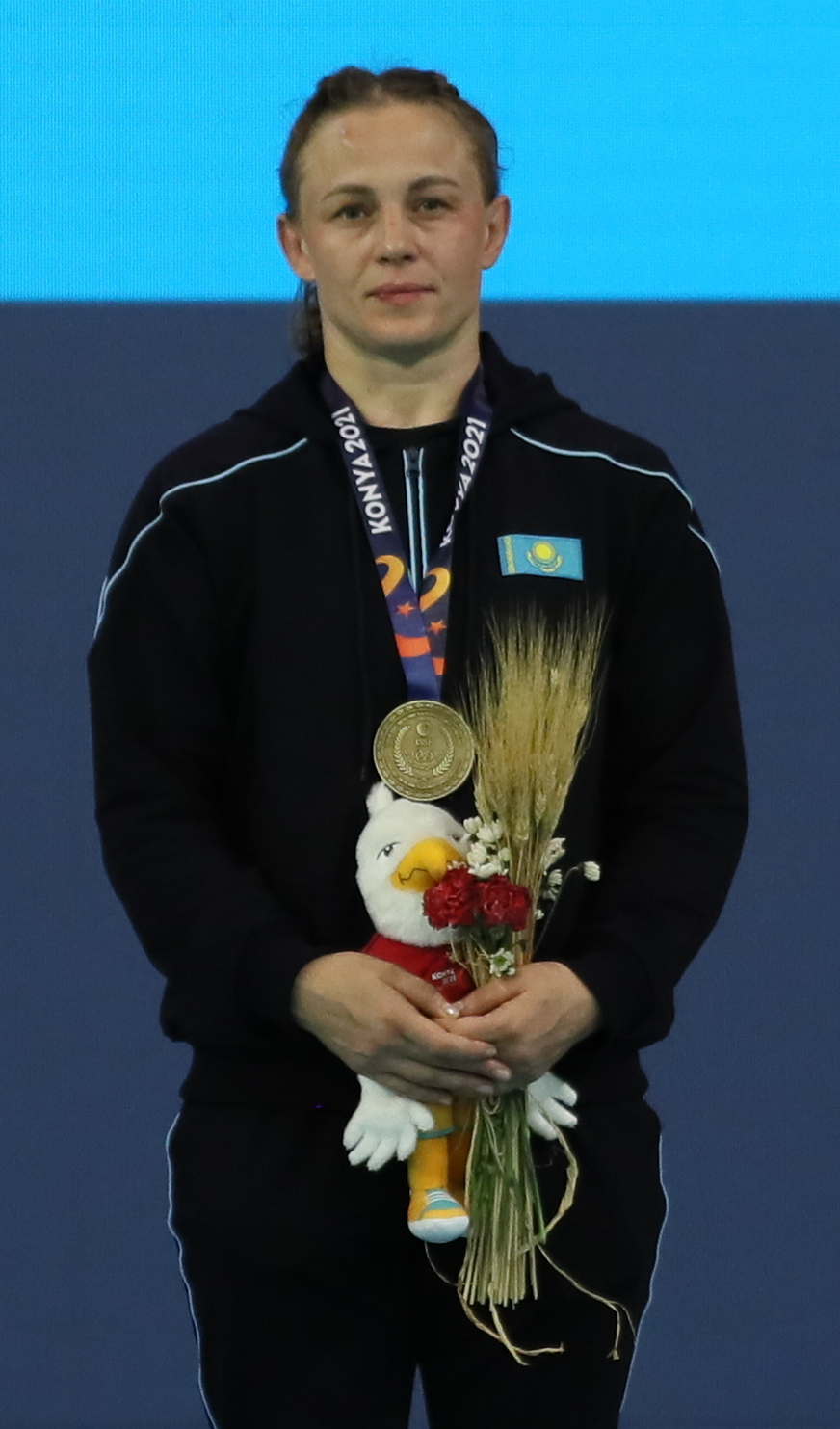

Medal record

Women's freestyle wrestling

Representing Kazakhstan

Olympic Games
Bronze medal – third place	2008 Beijing	63 kg

World Championships
Silver medal – second place	2010 Moscow	67 kg
Silver medal – second place	2007 Baku	63 kg
Bronze medal – third place	2009 Herning	63 kg

Asian Championships
Gold medal – first place	2009 Pattaya	67 kg
Gold medal – first place	2012 Gumi	67 kg
Silver medal – second place	2006 Almaty	63 kg
Silver medal – second place	2007 Bishkek	63 kg
Bronze medal – third place	2008 Jeju City	63 kg
Bronze medal – third place	2023 Astana	68 kg

Asian Games
Gold medal – first place	2010 Guangzhou	63 kg

Islamic Solidarity Games
Gold medal – first place	2021 Konya	65 kg

Yasar Dogu Tournament
Gold medal – first place	2023 Istanbul	68 kg
Bronze medal – third place	2024 Antalya	68 kg

Yelena Yevgenyevna Shalygina (born 15 December 1986 in Shymkent) is a Kazakh wrestler. She competed in the 63 kg weight class at the 2008 Summer Olympics, where she won a bronze medal.

At the 2008 Summer Olympics, she lost to Alena Kartashova in the last 16, but because Kartashova reached the final, Shalygina was able to compete in the repechage where she beat Elina Vaseva and then Lise Golliot-Legrand to win her bronze medal.

At the 2012 Summer Olympics she lost to Yuliya Ostapchuk in the first round.

She won the gold medal in the 65 kg event at the 2021 Islamic Solidarity Games held in Konya, Turkey. She competed in the 65 kg event at the 2022 World Wrestling Championships held in Belgrade, Serbia.

In September 2023, she competed in the women's 68 kg event at the 2023 World Wrestling Championships held in Belgrade, Serbia. In October 2023, she lost her bronze medal match in the women's 68 kg event at the 2022 Asian Games held in Hangzhou, China.
