= Agata Pietrzyk =

Polish sport wrestler

Personal information
- Born: July 27, 1988 (age 37)
Medal record
Women's freestyle wrestling
Representing Poland
World Championships
Bronze medal – third place	2008 Tokyo	59 kg
Silver medal – second place	2009 Herning	59 kg

Agata Pietrzyk (born July 27, 1988) is a Polish female freestyle wrestler (59 kg). She won a bronze medal on 2008 FILA Wrestling World Championships.
