= Randi Miller =

Olympic wrestler

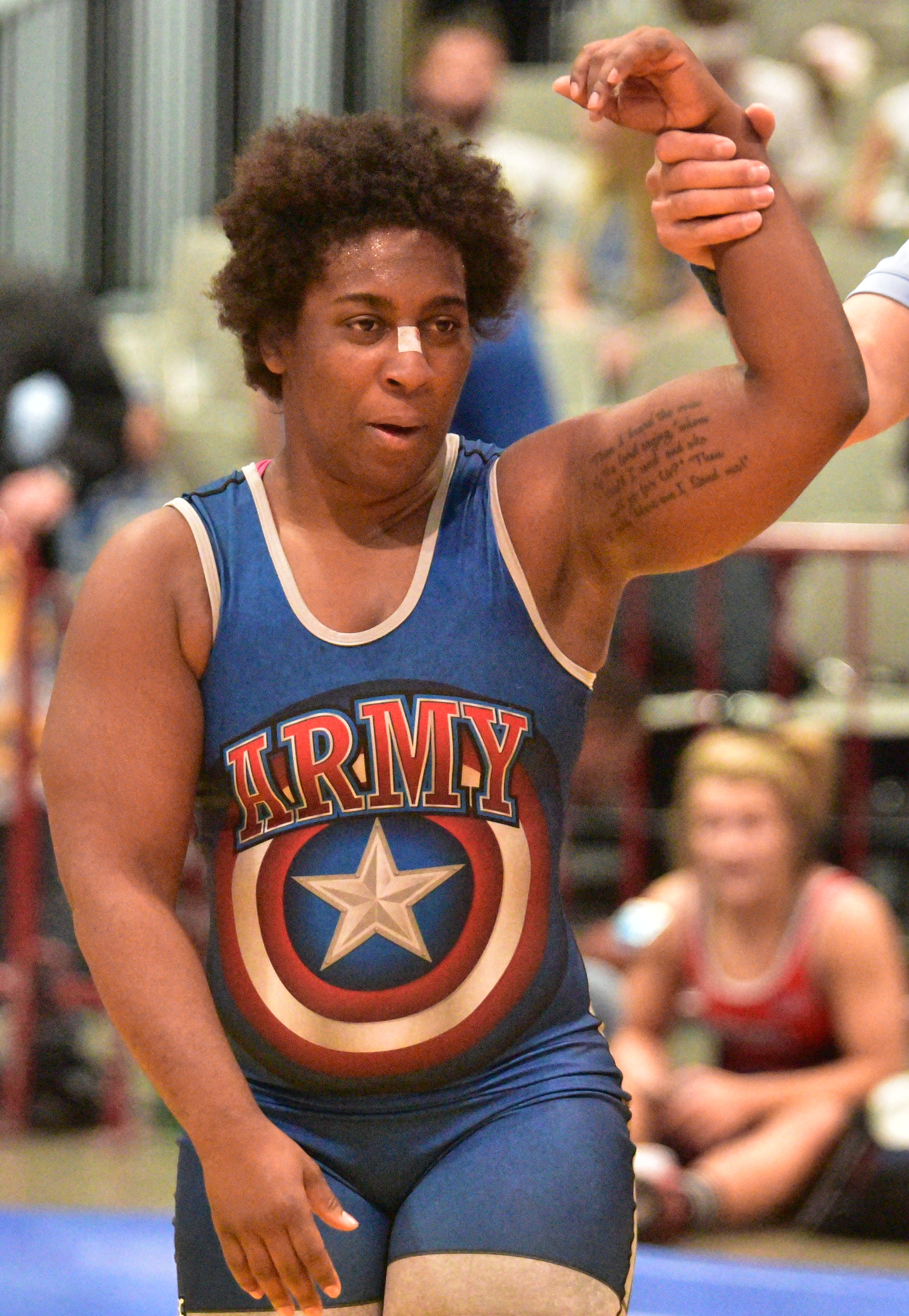
- Born: November 3, 1983 (age 42); Berkeley, California, U.S.
- Height: 5 ft 2 in (157 cm)
- Weight: 139 lb (63 kg; 9 st 13 lb)
- Fighting out of: Granite City, Illinois, U.S.
- Team: Zingano BJJ
- Wrestling: Olympian Freestyle Wrestling

Mixed martial arts record
- Total: 1
- Wins: 1
- By knockout: 1

Other information
- Mixed martial arts record from Sherdog

Randi Criner Miller (born November 3, 1983) is an American wrestler, who competed in the 63 kg weight class at the 2008 Summer Olympics and won a bronze medal. She later made a transition to mixed martial arts.

== Mixed martial arts career ==
Miller was scheduled to make her mixed martial arts debut on August 29, 2010, in Tokyo, Japan, against Hiroko Yamanaka. Miller withdrew from the fight because she was worried she was not ready to make her pro debut.

Miller's fight with Yamanaka was later announced for Jewels 11th Ring on December 17, 2010, but was officially cancelled again on December 6.

Miller made her MMA debut against Mollie Ahlers-Estes at Invicta Fighting Championships 1 on April 28, 2012. She won the fight via TKO in the third round.

== Career highlights ==
- Texas Wrestling Hall of Fame Inductee
- 2008 U.S.A. Wrestling Female Wrestler of the Year
- 2008 U.S. Olympic Committee Female Wrestler of the Year
- Olympic Bronze Medalist
- U.S. Olympic Team Trials Champion
- U.S. Senior Nationals Champion & Outstanding Wrestler award
- New York Athletic Club Champion & Outstanding Wrestler award
- Dave Schultz Memorial Champion & Outstanding Wrestler award
- Cliff Keen College National Duals Outstanding Wrestler award
- University Nationals Champion
- Pan-American Champion
- National Team Member
- 6x Senior All-American
- U.S. Olympic Training Center resident athlete
- Attended Northern Michigan University, MacMurray College, and Neosho County Community College

== Mixed martial arts record ==
Professional record breakdown
1 match	1 win	0 losses
By knockout	1	0

Res.	Record	Opponent	Method	Event	Date	Round	Time	Location	Notes
Win	1–0	Mollie Estes	TKO (punches)	Invicta FC 1: Coenen vs. Ruyssen	April 28, 2012	3	3:27	Kansas City, Kansas, United States	

== Awards ==
- Women's Wrestling Hall of Fame
  - WWHOF Award (1 time)
    - Coach of the Year (2025)
