= Lubov Volosova =

Russian sport wrestler

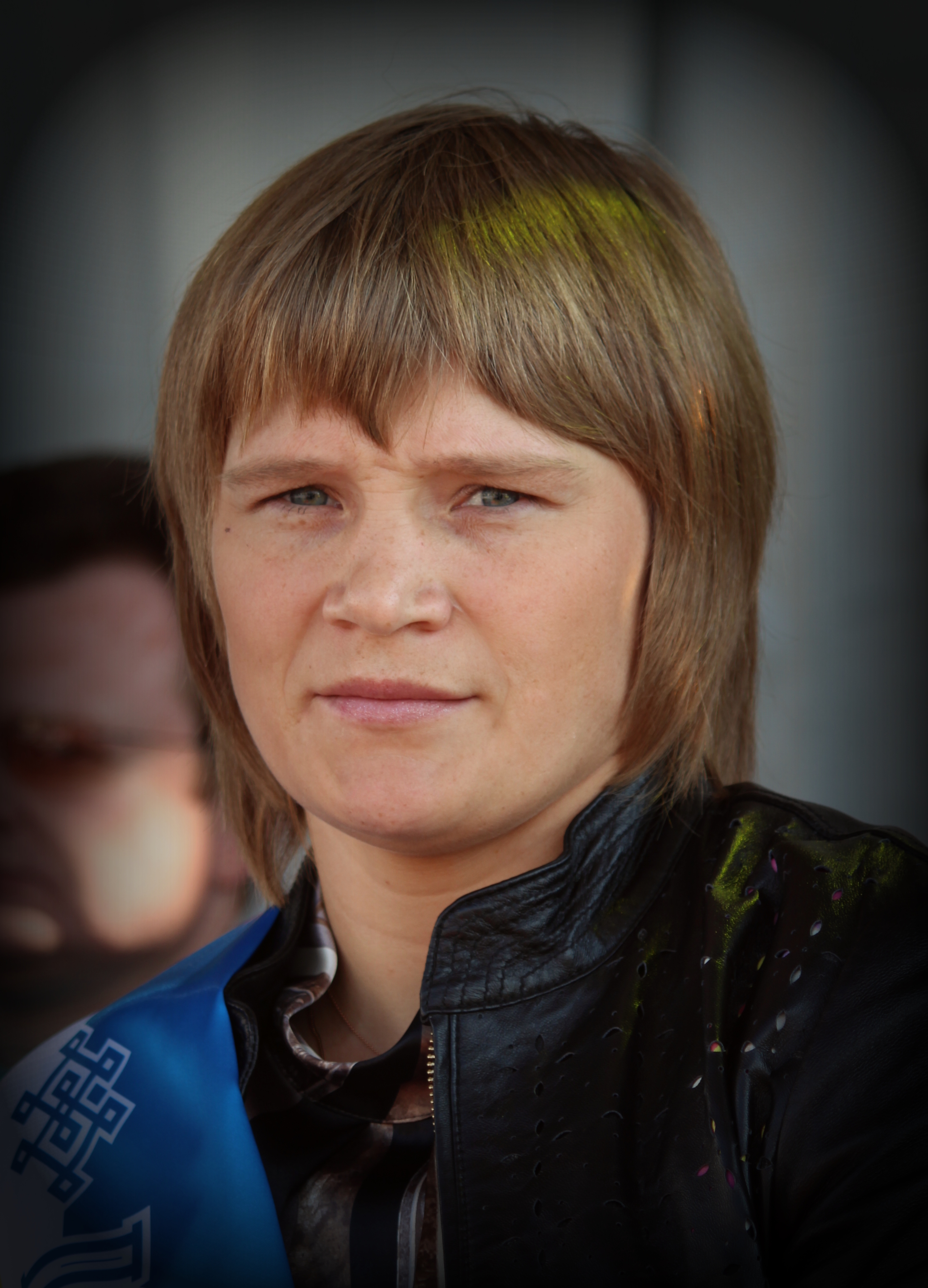

Medal record

Women's freestyle wrestling

Representing Russia

Olympic Games
Bronze medal – third place	2012 London	63 kg

World Championships
Silver medal – second place	2001 Sofia	56 kg
Silver medal – second place	2008 Tokyo	63 kg
Silver medal – second place	2009 Herning	63 kg
Bronze medal – third place	2010 Moscow	63 kg

European Championships
Gold medal – first place	2006 Moscow	59 kg
Gold medal – first place	2010 Baku	63 kg
Bronze medal – third place	2004 Haparanda	59 kg

Lubov Mikhaylovna Volosova (Russian: Любовь Михайловна Волосова; born August 16, 1982) is a female wrestler from Russia.

She won the bronze medal at the 2012 Summer Olympics in the women's 63 kg category.
