= Xu Haiyan =

Chinese wrestler (born 1984)

Xu Haiyan (born November 24 1984 in Zoucheng, Shandong) is a female Chinese freestyle wrestler who competed in the 2008 Summer Olympics.

Her personal best was coming 1st at the 2002 Asian Games - 63 kg freestyle.
