= 2003 World Wrestling Championships – Women's freestyle 55 kg =

Women's freestyle 55 kg at the 2003 World Championships
- Venue: Madison Square Garden
- Dates: 12–14 September 2003
- Competitors: 29 from 29 nations

Medalists
gold medal	Saori Yoshida	Japan
silver medal	Tina George	United States
bronze medal	Natalia Golts	Russia

The women's freestyle 55 kilograms is a competition featured at the 2003 World Wrestling Championships, and was held at the Madison Square Garden in New York, United States from 12 to 14 September 2003.

== Results ==
Legend

- F — Won by fall

=== Preliminary round ===
==== Pool 1 ====
Pos	Athlete	Pld	W	L	CP	TP	POL	SWE	GRE
1	Monika Michalik (POL)	2	2	0	6	5	—	2–0	3–1
2	Ida-Theres Karlsson (SWE)	2	1	1	3	5	0–3 PO	—	5–0
3	Sofia Poumpouridou (GRE)	2	0	2	1	1	1–3 PP	0–3 PO	—

Source: Official website

==== Pool 2 ====
Pos	Athlete	Pld	W	L	CP	TP	JPN	HUN	BLR
1	Saori Yoshida (JPN)	2	2	0	8	13	—	3–0 Fall	10–0
2	Kitti Godó (HUN)	2	1	1	3	4	0–4 TO	—	4–3
3	Olga Serbina (BLR)	2	0	2	1	3	0–4 ST	1–3 PP	—

Source: Official website

==== Pool 3 ====
Pos	Athlete	Pld	W	L	CP	TP	CAN	ITA	TPE
1	Jennifer Ryz (CAN)	2	2	0	7	11	—	7–4	4–0 Fall
2	Diletta Giampiccolo (ITA)	2	1	1	5	14	1–3 PP	—	10–0
3	Chuang Shu-fang (TPE)	2	0	2	0	0	0–4 TO	0–4 ST	—

Source: Official website

==== Pool 4 ====
Pos	Athlete	Pld	W	L	CP	TP	RUS	GER	IND
1	Natalia Golts (RUS)	2	2	0	6	11	—	8–0	3–0
2	Sabrina Lotz (GER)	2	1	1	3	7	0–3 PO	—	7–1
3	Alka Tomar (IND)	2	0	2	1	1	0–3 PO	1–3 PP	—

Source: Official website

==== Pool 5 ====
Pos	Athlete	Pld	W	L	CP	TP	VEN	AUT	AUS
1	Marcia Andrades (VEN)	2	2	0	7	16	—	9–3	7–0 Fall
2	Birgit Stern (AUT)	2	1	1	4	8	1–3 PP	—	5–3
3	Madeleine Schultz (AUS)	2	0	2	1	3	0–4 TO	1–3 PP	—

Source: Official website

==== Pool 6 ====
Pos	Athlete	Pld	W	L	CP	TP	CHN	KOR	PER
1	Sun Dongmei (CHN)	2	2	0	7	16	—	6–1	10–1 Fall
2	Lee Na-lae (KOR)	2	1	1	4	7	1–3 PP	—	6–0
3	Yanet Sovero (PER)	2	0	2	0	1	0–4 TO	0–3 PO	—

Source: Official website

==== Pool 7 ====
Pos	Athlete	Pld	W	L	CP	TP	FRA	ESP	TUR
1	Anna Gomis (FRA)	2	2	0	6	7	—	3–0	4–0
2	Minerva Montero (ESP)	2	1	1	3	3	0–3 PO	—	3–1
3	Zeynep Yıldırım (TUR)	2	0	2	1	1	0–3 PO	1–3 PP	—

Source: Official website

==== Pool 8 ====
Pos	Athlete	Pld	W	L	CP	TP	USA	BUL	KGZ	MDA
1	Tina George (USA)	3	3	0	10	24	—	9–3	10–2	5–0 Fall
2	Julieta Okot (BUL)	3	1	2	5	9	1–3 PP	—	4–1	2–9
3	Elvira Mursalova (KGZ)	3	1	2	5	11	1–3 PP	1–3 PP	—	8–6
4	Ludmila Cristea (MDA)	3	1	2	4	15	0–4 TO	3–1 PP	1–3 PP	—

Source: Official website

==== Pool 9 ====
Pos	Athlete	Pld	W	L	CP	TP	PUR	UKR	SEN	KAZ
1	Mabel Fonseca (PUR)	3	3	0	11	25	—	4–1	11–0 Fall	10–0
2	Tetyana Lazareva (UKR)	3	2	1	9	17	1–3 PP	—	9–0 Fall	7–0 Fall
3	Isabelle Sambou (SEN)	3	1	2	4	12	0–4 TO	0–4 TO	—	12–0
4	Roza Sagintayeva (KAZ)	3	0	3	0	0	0–4 ST	0–4 TO	0–4 ST	—

Source: Official website

=== Knockout round ===
Round of 16
Monika Michalik (POL)	0
Saori Yoshida (JPN)	4^{F}

Quarterfinals
Saori Yoshida (JPN)	10
Jennifer Ryz (CAN)	0
Natalia Golts (RUS)	3^{F}
Marcia Andrades (VEN)	0
Sun Dongmei (CHN)	4
Anna Gomis (FRA)	0
Tina George (USA)	7
Mabel Fonseca (PUR)	3

Semifinals
Saori Yoshida (JPN)	3
Natalia Golts (RUS)	2
Sun Dongmei (CHN)	3
Tina George (USA)	4

Final
Saori Yoshida (JPN)	5
Tina George (USA)	2
Bronze medal match
Natalia Golts (RUS)	4
Sun Dongmei (CHN)	0
