= List of European Championships medalists in wrestling (women) =

This is a List of European Championships medalists in women's freestyle wrestling.

== Light flyweight ==
- 44 kg: 1987–1996

Tournament	Gold	Silver	Bronze
1988 Dijon	Valérie Delvaux (FRA)	Brigitte Weigert (BEL)	Isabelle Poomarts (FRA)
1993 Ivanovo	Tatiana Karamchakova (RUS)	Liubov Shupina (RUS)	Oksana Nazarko (UKR)
1996 Oslo	Svetlana Kolatirina (RUS)	Almuth Leitgeb (AUT)	Yuliya Voitova (UKR)

== Flyweight ==
- 47 kg: 1987–1996
- 46 kg: 1997–2001
- 48 kg: 2002–2017
- 50 kg: 2018–

Tournament	Gold	Silver	Bronze
1988 Dijon	Ferouzia Cheufri (FRA)	Nadia Saïdi (FRA)	Lynie Holst (NED)
1993 Ivanovo	Tetei Alibekova (RUS)	Svetlana Odai (UKR)	Ulrike Boehme (LUX)
1996 Oslo	Angélique Berthenet (FRA)	Olga Kosmak (RUS)	Mette Barlie (NOR)
1997 Warsaw	Farah Touchi (FRA)	Mette Barlie (NOR)	Lidiya Karamchakova (RUS)
1998 Bratislava	Inga Karamchakova (RUS)	Mette Barlie (NOR)	Farah Touchi (FRA)
1999 Götzis	Inga Karamchakova (RUS)	Yuliya Voitova (UKR)	Farah Touchi (FRA)
2000 Budapest	Lidiya Karamçakova (RUS)	Farah Touchi (FRA)	Kameliya Tsekova (BUL)
2001 Budapest	Inga Karamchakova (RUS)	Iryna Merleni (UKR)	Kamelia Tsekova (BUL)
2002 Seinäjoki	Inga Karamchakova (RUS)	Brigitte Wagner (GER)	Angélique Berthenet (FRA)
2003 Riga	Brigitte Wagner (GER)	Liliya Kaskarakova (RUS)	Angélique Berthenet (FRA)
2004 Haparanda	Iryna Merleni (UKR)	Brigitte Wagner (GER)	Myrsini Koloni (GRE)
2005 Varna	Lorisa Oorzhak (RUS)	Iwona Matkowska (POL)	Anne-Catherine Deluntsch (FRA)
2005 Varna	Lorisa Oorzhak (RUS)	Iwona Matkowska (POL)	Fani Psatha (GRE)
2006 Moscow	Liliya Kaskarakova (RUS)	Fani Psatha (GRE)	Fracine Martinez (ITA)
2006 Moscow	Liliya Kaskarakova (RUS)	Fani Psatha (GRE)	Cristina Croitoru (ROU)
2007 Sofia	Lorisa Oorzhak (RUS)	Fracine Martinez (ITA)	Sofia Mattsson (SWE)
2007 Sofia	Lorisa Oorzhak (RUS)	Fracine Martinez (ITA)	Brigitte Wagner (GER)
2008 Tampere	Mariya Stadnik (AZE)	Vanessa Boubryemm (FRA)	Oleksandra Kohut (UKR)
2008 Tampere	Mariya Stadnik (AZE)	Vanessa Boubryemm (FRA)	Iwona Matkowska (POL)
2009 Vilnius	Mariya Stadnik (AZE)	Estera Dobre (ROU)	Sarianne Savola (FIN)
2009 Vilnius	Mariya Stadnik (AZE)	Estera Dobre (ROU)	Lilia Kaskarakova (RUS)
2010 Baku	Lorisa Oorzhak (RUS)	Yana Stadnik (GBR)	Melanie Lesaffre (FRA)
2010 Baku	Lorisa Oorzhak (RUS)	Yana Stadnik (GBR)	Iwona Matkowska (POL)
2011 Dortmund	Mariya Stadnik (AZE)	Khrystyna Daranutsa (UKR)	Iwona Matkowska (POL)
2011 Dortmund	Mariya Stadnik (AZE)	Khrystyna Daranutsa (UKR)	Cristina Croitoru (ROU)
2012 Belgrade	Lyudmyla Balushka (UKR)	Estera Dobre (ROU)	Marina Vilmova (RUS)
2012 Belgrade	Lyudmyla Balushka (UKR)	Estera Dobre (ROU)	Jaqueline Schellin (GER)
2013 Tbilisi	Valeriya Chepsarakova (RUS)	Yana Stadnik (GBR)	Jacqueline Schellin (GER)
2013 Tbilisi	Valeriya Chepsarakova (RUS)	Yana Stadnik (GBR)	Patimat Bagomedova (AZE)
2014 Vantaa	Mariya Stadnik (AZE)	Nataliya Pulkovska (UKR)	Fredrika Petersson (SWE)
2014 Vantaa	Mariya Stadnik (AZE)	Nataliya Pulkovska (UKR)	Nadezda Fedorova (RUS)
2015 Baku	Mariya Stadnik (AZE)	Elitsa Yankova (BUL)	Iwona Matkowska (POL)
2015 Baku	Mariya Stadnik (AZE)	Elitsa Yankova (BUL)	Valentina Islamova (RUS)
2016 Riga	Mariya Stadnik (AZE)	Alina Vuc (ROU)	Elitsa Yankova (BUL)
2016 Riga	Mariya Stadnik (AZE)	Alina Vuc (ROU)	Maryna Markevich (BLR)
2017 Novi Sad	Mariya Stadnik (AZE)	Ilona Semkiv (UKR)	Fredrika Petersson (SWE)
2017 Novi Sad	Mariya Stadnik (AZE)	Ilona Semkiv (UKR)	Alina Vuc (ROU)
2018 Kaspiysk	Mariya Stadnik (AZE)	Alina Vuc (ROU)	Evin Demirhan (TUR)
2018 Kaspiysk	Mariya Stadnik (AZE)	Alina Vuc (ROU)	Milana Dadasheva (RUS)
2019 Bucharest	Oksana Livach (UKR)	Miglena Selishka (BUL)	Evin Demirhan (TUR)
2019 Bucharest	Oksana Livach (UKR)	Miglena Selishka (BUL)	Kseniya Stankevich (BLR)
2020 Roma	Miglena Selishka (BUL)	Oksana Livach (UKR)	Kseniya Stankevich (BLR)
2020 Roma	Miglena Selishka (BUL)	Oksana Livach (UKR)	Milana Dadasheva (RUS)
2021 Warsaw	Mariya Stadnik (AZE)	Miglena Selishka (BUL)	Anna Łukasiak (POL)
2021 Warsaw	Mariya Stadnik (AZE)	Miglena Selishka (BUL)	Ekaterina Poleshchuk (RUS)
2022 Budapest	Evin Demirhan (TUR)	Miglena Selishka (BUL)	Alina Vuc (ROU)
2022 Budapest	Evin Demirhan (TUR)	Miglena Selishka (BUL)	Anna Łukasiak (POL)
2023 Zagreb	Mariya Stadnik (AZE)	Oksana Livach (UKR)	Evin Demirhan (TUR)
2023 Zagreb	Mariya Stadnik (AZE)	Oksana Livach (UKR)	Emanuela Liuzzi (ITA)
2024 Bucharest	Mariya Stadnik (AZE)	Evin Demirhan Yavuz (TUR)	Miglena Selishka (BUL)
2024 Bucharest	Mariya Stadnik (AZE)	Evin Demirhan Yavuz (TUR)	Milana Dadasheva (ANA)

== Bantamweight ==
- 50 kg: 1987–1996
- 51 kg: 1997–2013
- 53 kg: 2014–

Tournament	Gold	Silver	Bronze
1988 Dijon	Martine Poupon (FRA)	Anne Halvorsen (NOR)	Eve Joly (FRA)
1993 Ivanovo	Liliya Islamova (RUS)	Anguela Belous (UKR)	Anna Gomis (FRA)
1996 Oslo	Yelena Yegoshina (RUS)	Tanja Sauter (GER)	Joanna Urbańska (POL)
1997 Warsaw	Yelena Yegoshina (RUS)	Tanja Sauter (GER)	Angélique Berthenet (FRA)
1998 Bratislava	Yelena Yegoshina (RUS)	Tanja Sauter (GER)	Angélique Berthenet (FRA)
1999 Götzis	Marta Wojtanowska (POL)	Yelena Yegoshina (RUS)	Tanja Sauter (GER)
2000 Budapest	Olga Smirnova (RUS)	Ida-Theres Nerell (SWE)	Inesa Rebar (UKR)
2001 Budapest	Sofia Poumpouridou (GRE)	Natalia Gushina (RUS)	Alena Kareicha (BLR)
2002 Seinäjoki	Olga Smirnova (RUS)	Ida-Theres Nerell (SWE)	Inesa Rebar (UKR)
2003 Riga	Natalia Karamchakova (RUS)	Ida-Theres Nerell (SWE)	Alexandra Engelhardt (GER)
2004 Haparanda	Inesa Rebar (UKR)	Ida-Theres Nerell (SWE)	Alena Kareicha (BLR)
2005 Varna	Iryna Merleni (UKR)	Natalia Smirnova (RUS)	Vanessa Boubryemm (FRA)
2005 Varna	Iryna Merleni (UKR)	Natalia Smirnova (RUS)	Ana Maria Pavăl (ROU)
2006 Moscow	Vanessa Boubryemm (FRA)	Alexandra Engelhardt (GER)	Natalia Smirnova (RUS)
2006 Moscow	Vanessa Boubryemm (FRA)	Alexandra Engelhardt (GER)	Oleksandra Kohut (UKR)
2007 Sofia	Zamira Rakhmanova (RUS)	Estera Dobre (ROU)	Emese Barka (HUN)
2007 Sofia	Zamira Rakhmanova (RUS)	Estera Dobre (ROU)	María Serrano (ESP)
2008 Tampere	Anna Trusova (RUS)	Sofia Mattsson (SWE)	Tiina Ylinen (FIN)
2008 Tampere	Anna Trusova (RUS)	Sofia Mattsson (SWE)	Yuliya Blahinya (UKR)
2009 Vilnius	Ekaterina Krasnova (RUS)	Emese Szabó (HUN)	Yuliya Blahinya (UKR)
2009 Vilnius	Ekaterina Krasnova (RUS)	Emese Szabó (HUN)	Francine De Paola (ITA)
2010 Baku	Sofia Mattsson (SWE)	Estera Dobre (ROU)	Oleksandra Kohut (UKR)
2010 Baku	Sofia Mattsson (SWE)	Estera Dobre (ROU)	Alexandra Engelhardt (GER)
2011 Dortmund	Yuliya Blahinya (UKR)	Estera Dobre (ROU)	Natalia Budu (MDA)
2011 Dortmund	Yuliya Blahinya (UKR)	Estera Dobre (ROU)	Ekaterina Krasnova (RUS)
2012 Belgrade	Iwona Matkowska (POL)	Oleksandra Kogut (UKR)	Alexandra Demmel (GER)
2012 Belgrade	Iwona Matkowska (POL)	Oleksandra Kogut (UKR)	Katya Krasnova (RUS)
2013 Tbilisi	Roksana Zasina (POL)	Estera Dobre (ROU)	Ekaterina Krasnova (RUS)
2013 Tbilisi	Roksana Zasina (POL)	Estera Dobre (ROU)	Yuliya Blahinya (UKR)
2014 Vantaa	Maria Gurova (RUS)	Maria Prevolaraki (GRE)	Natalia Budu (MDA)
2014 Vantaa	Maria Gurova (RUS)	Maria Prevolaraki (GRE)	Ana Maria Pavăl (ROU)
2015 Baku	Anzhela Dorogan (AZE)	Roksana Zasina (POL)	Merve Kenger (TUR)
2015 Baku	Anzhela Dorogan (AZE)	Roksana Zasina (POL)	Nadzeya Shushko (BLR)
2016 Riga	Sofia Mattsson (SWE)	Iryna Kurachkina (BLR)	Nina Hemmer (GER)
2016 Riga	Sofia Mattsson (SWE)	Iryna Kurachkina (BLR)	Yuliya Blahinya (UKR)
2017 Novi Sad	Vanesa Kaladzinskaya (BLR)	Natalia Malysheva (RUS)	Nina Hemmer (GER)
2017 Novi Sad	Vanesa Kaladzinskaya (BLR)	Natalia Malysheva (RUS)	Maria Prevolaraki (GRE)
2018 Kaspiysk	Stalvira Orshush (RUS)	Vanesa Kaladzinskaya (BLR)	Maria Prevolaraki (GRE)
2018 Kaspiysk	Stalvira Orshush (RUS)	Vanesa Kaladzinskaya (BLR)	Katarzyna Krawczyk (POL)
2019 Bucharest	Stalvira Orshush (RUS)	Lilya Horishna (UKR)	Jessica Blaszka (NED)
2019 Bucharest	Stalvira Orshush (RUS)	Lilya Horishna (UKR)	Vanesa Kaladzinskaya (BLR)
2020 Roma	Vanesa Kaladzinskaya (BLR)	Jessica Blaszka (NED)	Annika Wendle (GER)
2020 Roma	Vanesa Kaladzinskaya (BLR)	Jessica Blaszka (NED)	Stalvira Orshush (RUS)
2021 Warsaw	Olga Khoroshavtseva (RUS)	Maria Prevolaraki (GRE)	Annika Wendle (GER)
2021 Warsaw	Olga Khoroshavtseva (RUS)	Maria Prevolaraki (GRE)	Iulia Leorda (MDA)
2022 Budapest	Jonna Malmgren (SWE)	Maria Prevolaraki (GRE)	Iulia Leorda (MDA)
2022 Budapest	Jonna Malmgren (SWE)	Maria Prevolaraki (GRE)	Katarzyna Krawczyk (POL)
2023 Zagreb	Jonna Malmgren (SWE)	Stalvira Orshush (HUN)	Zeynep Yetgil (TUR)
2023 Zagreb	Jonna Malmgren (SWE)	Stalvira Orshush (HUN)	Maria Prevolaraki (GRE)
2024 Bucharest	Vanesa Kaladzinskaya (ANA)	Jonna Malmgren (SWE)	Zeynep Yetgil (TUR)
2024 Bucharest	Vanesa Kaladzinskaya (ANA)	Jonna Malmgren (SWE)	Maria Prevolaraki (GRE)

== Featherweight ==
- 53 kg: 1987–1996
- 55 kg: 2014–

Tournament	Gold	Silver	Bronze
1988 Dijon	Sylvie van Gucht (FRA)	Sandrine Laroza (FRA)	Thinka Bergh (SWE)
1993 Ivanovo	Yelena Yegoshina (RUS)	Tatiana Antonova (UKR)	Agnès Canna-Ferina (FRA)
1996 Oslo	Anna Gomis (FRA)	Angela Lattanzio (ITA)	Olga Smirnova (RUS)
2014 Vantaa	Sofia Mattsson (SWE)	Anna Zwirydowska (POL)	Irina Ologonova (RUS)
2014 Vantaa	Sofia Mattsson (SWE)	Anna Zwirydowska (POL)	Mimi Hristova (BUL)
2015 Baku	Sofia Mattsson (SWE)	Katarzyna Krawczyk (POL)	Evelina Nikolova (BUL)
2015 Baku	Sofia Mattsson (SWE)	Katarzyna Krawczyk (POL)	Nataliya Synyshyn (AZE)
2016 Riga	Irina Ologonova (RUS)	Tetyana Kit (UKR)	Roksana Zasina (POL)
2016 Riga	Irina Ologonova (RUS)	Tetyana Kit (UKR)	Ramóna Galambos (HUN)
2017 Novi Sad	Bilyana Dudova (BUL)	Katsiaryna Hanchar (BLR)	Mathilde Riviere (FRA)
2017 Novi Sad	Bilyana Dudova (BUL)	Katsiaryna Hanchar (BLR)	Alyona Kolesnik (AZE)
2018 Kaspiysk	Iryna Kurachkina (BLR)	Roksana Zasina (POL)	Bediha Gün (TUR)
2018 Kaspiysk	Iryna Kurachkina (BLR)	Roksana Zasina (POL)	Maria Gurova (RUS)
2019 Bucharest	Iryna Husyak (UKR)	Evelina Nikolova (BUL)	Bediha Gün (TUR)
2019 Bucharest	Iryna Husyak (UKR)	Evelina Nikolova (BUL)	Andreea Ana (ROU)
2020 Roma	Olga Khoroshavtseva (RUS)	Solomiia Vynnyk (UKR)	Bediha Gün (TUR)
2020 Roma	Olga Khoroshavtseva (RUS)	Solomiia Vynnyk (UKR)	Sofia Mattsson (SWE)
2021 Warsaw	Stalvira Orshush (RUS)	Roksana Zasina (POL)	Andreea Ana (ROU)
2021 Warsaw	Stalvira Orshush (RUS)	Roksana Zasina (POL)	Khrystyna-Zoryana Demko (UKR)
2022 Budapest	Andreea Ana (ROU)	Oleksandra Khomenets (UKR)	Bediha Gün (TUR)
2022 Budapest	Andreea Ana (ROU)	Oleksandra Khomenets (UKR)	Mariana Drăguțan (MDA)
2023 Zagreb	Andreea Ana (ROU)	Erika Bognár (HUN)	Tatiana Debien (FRA)
2023 Zagreb	Andreea Ana (ROU)	Erika Bognár (HUN)	Katarzyna Krawczyk (POL)
2024 Bucharest	Andreea Ana (ROU)	Mariana Drăguțan (MDA)	Roksana Zasina (POL)
2024 Bucharest	Andreea Ana (ROU)	Mariana Drăguțan (MDA)	Anastasia Blayvas (GER)

== Lightweight ==
- 57 kg: 1987–1996
- 56 kg: 1997–2001
- 55 kg: 2002–2013
- 58 kg: 2004–2017
- 57 kg: 2018–

Tournament	Gold	Silver	Bronze
1988 Dijon	Jocelyne Sagon (FRA)	Isabelle Dourthe (FRA)	Runi Rodal (NOR)
1993 Ivanovo	Natalia Vinogradova (RUS)	Oksana Lapshina (UKR)	None awarded
1996 Oslo	Sara Eriksson (SWE)	Lene Aanes (NOR)	Natalia Ivanova (RUS)
1997 Warsaw	Anna Gomis (FRA)	Tetyana Komarnytska (NOR)	Sara Eriksson (SWE)
1998 Bratislava	Anna Gomis (FRA)	Sara Eriksson (SWE)	Diletta Giampiccolo (ITA)
1999 Götzis	Anna Gomis (FRA)	Sara Eriksson (SWE)	Tetyana Lazareva (UKR)
2000 Budapest	Sara Eriksson (SWE)	Natalia Ivashko (RUS)	Anna Gomis (FRA)
2001 Budapest	Tetyana Lazareva (UKR)	Ida-Theres Nerell (SWE)	Konstantina Tsibanaku (GRE)
2002 Seinäjoki	Tetyana Lazareva (UKR)	Ida-Theres Nerell (SWE)	Gudrun Høie (NOR)
2003 Riga	Nataliya Golts (RUS)	Sofia Poumpouridou (GRE)	Sylwia Bileńska (POL)
2004 Haparanda	Ida Hellström (SWE)	Tetyana Lazareva (UKR)	Natalia Karamchakova (RUS)
2005 Varna	Nataliya Golts (RUS)	Anna Gomis (FRA)	Mariya Yahorava (BLR)
2005 Varna	Nataliya Golts (RUS)	Anna Gomis (FRA)	Sylwia Bileńska (POL)
2006 Moscow	Nataliya Golts (RUS)	Ludmila Cristea (MDA)	Anna Gomis (FRA)
2006 Moscow	Nataliya Golts (RUS)	Ludmila Cristea (MDA)	Johanna Mattsson (SWE)
2007 Sofia	Nataliya Golts (RUS)	Nataliya Synyshyn (UKR)	Anna Gomis (FRA)
2007 Sofia	Nataliya Golts (RUS)	Nataliya Synyshyn (UKR)	Sofia Poumpouridou (GRE)
2008 Tampere	Nataliya Golts (RUS)	Ludmila Cristea (MDA)	Sofia Poumpouridou (GRE)
2008 Tampere	Nataliya Golts (RUS)	Ludmila Cristea (MDA)	Tetyana Lazareva (UKR)
2009 Vilnius	Nataliya Synyshyn (UKR)	Alena Filipava (BLR)	Natalia Smirnova (RUS)
2009 Vilnius	Nataliya Synyshyn (UKR)	Alena Filipava (BLR)	Ana Maria Pavăl (ROU)
2010 Baku	Anastasija Grigorjeva (LAT)	Natalia Golts (RUS)	Agata Pietrzyk (POL)
2010 Baku	Anastasija Grigorjeva (LAT)	Natalia Golts (RUS)	Ana Maria Pavăl (ROU)
2011 Dortmund	Ida-Theres Nerell (SWE)	Ludmila Cristea (MDA)	Maria Gurova (RUS)
2011 Dortmund	Ida-Theres Nerell (SWE)	Ludmila Cristea (MDA)	Katarzyna Krawczyk (POL)
2012 Belgrade	Nataliya Synyshyn (UKR)	Sofia Mattsson (SWE)	Maria Gurova (RUS)
2012 Belgrade	Nataliya Synyshyn (UKR)	Sofia Mattsson (SWE)	Ana Maria Pavăl (ROU)
2013 Tbilisi	Sofia Mattsson (SWE)	Maria Prevolaraki (GRE)	Iryna Husyak (UKR)
2013 Tbilisi	Sofia Mattsson (SWE)	Maria Prevolaraki (GRE)	Emese Barka (HUN)
2014 Vantaa	Valeria Zholobova (RUS)	Irina Netreba (AZE)	Viktoria Bobeva (BUL)
2014 Vantaa	Valeria Zholobova (RUS)	Irina Netreba (AZE)	Petra Olli (FIN)
2015 Baku	Emese Barka (HUN)	Tetyana Lavrenchuk (UKR)	Elif Jale Yeşilırmak (TUR)
2015 Baku	Emese Barka (HUN)	Tetyana Lavrenchuk (UKR)	Grace Bullen (NOR)
2016 Riga	Nataliya Synyshyn (AZE)	Grace Bullen (NOR)	Hanna Vasylenko (UKR)
2016 Riga	Nataliya Synyshyn (AZE)	Grace Bullen (NOR)	Mimi Hristova (BUL)
2017 Novi Sad	Grace Bullen (NOR)	Mariana Cherdivara (MDA)	Laura Mertens (GER)
2017 Novi Sad	Grace Bullen (NOR)	Mariana Cherdivara (MDA)	Emese Barka (HUN)
2018 Kaspiysk	Bilyana Dudova (BUL)	Irina Ologonova (RUS)	Emese Barka (HUN)
2018 Kaspiysk	Bilyana Dudova (BUL)	Irina Ologonova (RUS)	Alyona Kolesnik (AZE)
2019 Bucharest	Emese Barka (HUN)	Tetyana Kit (UKR)	Alyona Kolesnik (AZE)
2019 Bucharest	Emese Barka (HUN)	Tetyana Kit (UKR)	Anastasia Nichita (MDA)
2020 Roma	Grace Bullen (NOR)	Alina Akobiia (UKR)	Johanna Lindborg (SWE)
2020 Roma	Grace Bullen (NOR)	Alina Akobiia (UKR)	Iryna Kurachkina (BLR)
2021 Warsaw	Iryna Kurachkina (BLR)	Angelina Łysak (POL)	Alina Hrushyna (UKR)
2021 Warsaw	Iryna Kurachkina (BLR)	Angelina Łysak (POL)	Evelina Nikolova (BUL)
2022 Budapest	Alina Hrushyna (UKR)	Evelina Nikolova (BUL)	Tamara Dollák (HUN)
2022 Budapest	Alina Hrushyna (UKR)	Evelina Nikolova (BUL)	Sandra Paruszewski (GER)
2023 Zagreb	Alina Hrushyna (UKR)	Zhala Aliyeva (AZE)	Evelina Nikolova (BUL)
2023 Zagreb	Alina Hrushyna (UKR)	Zhala Aliyeva (AZE)	Elena Brugger (GER)
2024 Bucharest	Iryna Kurachkina (ANA)	Evelina Nikolova (BUL)	Anhelina Lysak (POL)
2024 Bucharest	Iryna Kurachkina (ANA)	Evelina Nikolova (BUL)	Solomiia Vynnyk (UKR)

== Welterweight ==
- 59 kg: 2002–2013
- 60 kg: 2014–2017
- 59 kg: 2018–

Tournament	Gold	Silver	Bronze
2002 Seinäjoki	Sara Eriksson (SWE)	Monika Michalik (POL)	Christina Oertli (GER)
2003 Riga	Monika Michalik (POL)	Stefanie Stüber (GER)	Olha Kryhina (UKR)
2004 Haparanda	Helena Allandi (SWE)	Sabrina Esposito (ITA)	Lubov Volosova (RUS)
2005 Varna	Ida-Theres Nerell (SWE)	Audrey Prieto (FRA)	Yuliya Ratkevich (BLR)
2005 Varna	Ida-Theres Nerell (SWE)	Audrey Prieto (FRA)	Diletta Giampiccolo (ITA)
2006 Moscow	Lubov Volosova (RUS)	Stefanie Stüber (GER)	Audrey Prieto (FRA)
2006 Moscow	Lubov Volosova (RUS)	Stefanie Stüber (GER)	Marianna Sastin (HUN)
2007 Sofia	Ida-Theres Nerell (SWE)	Marianna Sastin (HUN)	Galina Legenkina (RUS)
2007 Sofia	Ida-Theres Nerell (SWE)	Marianna Sastin (HUN)	Anna Zwirydowska (POL)
2008 Tampere	Ida-Theres Nerell (SWE)	Elvira Mursalova (AZE)	Larissa Kanaeva (RUS)
2008 Tampere	Ida-Theres Nerell (SWE)	Elvira Mursalova (AZE)	Nataliya Synyshyn (UKR)
2009 Vilnius	Johanna Mattsson (SWE)	Irina Khariv (UKR)	Yulia Rekvava (RUS)
2009 Vilnius	Johanna Mattsson (SWE)	Irina Khariv (UKR)	Meryem Selloum (FRA)
2010 Baku	Sona Ahmadli (AZE)	Taybe Yusein (BUL)	Meryem Selloum (FRA)
2010 Baku	Sona Ahmadli (AZE)	Taybe Yusein (BUL)	Marianna Sastin (HUN)
2011 Dortmund	Yuliya Ratkevich (AZE)	Georgiana Paic (ROU)	Olga Butkevych (GBR)
2011 Dortmund	Yuliya Ratkevich (AZE)	Georgiana Paic (ROU)	Ganna Vasylenko (UKR)
2012 Belgrade	Ganna Vasylenko (UKR)	Anastasija Grigorjeva (LAT)	Sona Ahmadli (AZE)
2012 Belgrade	Ganna Vasylenko (UKR)	Anastasija Grigorjeva (LAT)	Ludmila Cristea (MDA)
2013 Tbilisi	Anastasiya Huchok (BLR)	Zhargalma Tcyrenova (RUS)	Tetyana Lavrenchuk (UKR)
2013 Tbilisi	Anastasiya Huchok (BLR)	Zhargalma Tcyrenova (RUS)	Hafize Şahin (TUR)
2014 Vantaa	Johanna Mattsson (SWE)	Hafize Şahin (TUR)	Olga Butkevych (GBR)
2014 Vantaa	Johanna Mattsson (SWE)	Hafize Şahin (TUR)	Taybe Yusein (BUL)
2015 Baku	Marianna Sastin (HUN)	Svetlana Lipatova (RUS)	Veranika Ivanova (BLR)
2015 Baku	Marianna Sastin (HUN)	Svetlana Lipatova (RUS)	Taybe Yusein (BUL)
2016 Riga	Nataliya Synyshyn (AZE)	Grace Bullen (NOR)	Hanna Vasylenko (UKR)
2016 Riga	Nataliya Synyshyn (AZE)	Grace Bullen (NOR)	Mimi Hristova (BUL)
2017 Novi Sad	Grace Bullen (NOR)	Mariana Cherdivara (MDA)	Laura Mertens (GER)
2017 Novi Sad	Grace Bullen (NOR)	Mariana Cherdivara (MDA)	Emese Barka (HUN)
2018 Kaspiysk	Elif Jale Yeşilırmak (TUR)	Mimi Hristova (BUL)	Svetlana Lipatova (RUS)
2018 Kaspiysk	Elif Jale Yeşilırmak (TUR)	Mimi Hristova (BUL)	Tetiana Omelchenko (AZE)
2019 Bucharest	Bilyana Dudova (BUL)	Svetlana Lipatova (RUS)	Elmira Gambarova (AZE)
2019 Bucharest	Bilyana Dudova (BUL)	Svetlana Lipatova (RUS)	Elif Jale Yeşilırmak (TUR)
2020 Roma	Anastasia Nichita (MDA)	Bilyana Dudova (BUL)	Lyubov Ovcharova (RUS)
2020 Roma	Anastasia Nichita (MDA)	Bilyana Dudova (BUL)	Anhelina Lysak (UKR)
2021 Warsaw	Bilyana Dudova (BUL)	Veronika Chumikova (RUS)	Kateryna Zhydachevska (ROU)
2021 Warsaw	Bilyana Dudova (BUL)	Veronika Chumikova (RUS)	Anastasia Nichita (MDA)
2022 Budapest	Anastasia Nichita (MDA)	Jowita Wrzesień (POL)	Elena Brugger (GER)
2023 Zagreb	Anastasia Nichita (MDA)	Yuliya Tkach (UKR)	Othelie Høie (NOR)
2023 Zagreb	Anastasia Nichita (MDA)	Yuliya Tkach (UKR)	Sandra Paruszewski (GER)
2024 Bucharest	Alyona Kolesnik (AZE)	Alina Filipovych (UKR)	Patrycja Gil (POL)
2024 Bucharest	Alyona Kolesnik (AZE)	Alina Filipovych (UKR)	Alesia Hetmanava (ANA)

== Middleweight ==
- 61 kg: 1987–1996
- 62 kg: 1997–2001
- 63 kg: 2002–2017
- 62 kg: 2018–

Tournament	Gold	Silver	Bronze
1988 Dijon	Brigitte Siffert (FRA)	Christelle Rieu (FRA)	Ine Barlie (NOR)
1993 Ivanovo	Zeinab Kazavatova (RUS)	Evdokia Grigoria (GRE)	Isabelle Dourthe (FRA)
1996 Oslo	Nikola Hartmann (AUT)	Anna Udycz (POL)	Elmira Muhammedova (AZE)
1997 Warsaw	Nikola Hartmann (AUT)	Natalia Vinogradova (RUS)	Lise Legrand (FRA)
1998 Bratislava	Nikola Hartmann (AUT)	Stéphanie Groß (GER)	Lene Aanes (NOR)
1999 Götzis	Nikola Hartmann (AUT)	Małgorzata Bassa-Roguska (POL)	Diletta Giampiccolo (ITA)
2000 Budapest	Nikola Hartmann (AUT)	Gudrun Høie (NOR)	Natalia Ivanova (RUS)
2001 Budapest	Małgorzata Bassa-Roguska (POL)	Natalia Ivanova (RUS)	Lene Aanes (NOR)
2002 Seinäjoki	Małgorzata Bassa-Roguska (POL)	Lene Aanes (NOR)	Daria Nazarova (RUS)
2003 Riga	Lene Aanes (NOR)	Nikola Hartmann (AUT)	Sara Eriksson (SWE)
2004 Haparanda	Alena Kartashova (RUS)	Stéphanie Groß (GER)	Sara Eriksson (SWE)
2005 Varna	Monika Michalik (POL)	Volha Jilko (BLR)	Nikola Hartmann (AUT)
2005 Varna	Monika Michalik (POL)	Volha Jilko (BLR)	Mihaela Panait (ROU)
2006 Moscow	Alena Kartashova (RUS)	Monika Michalik (POL)	Nikola Hartmann (AUT)
2006 Moscow	Alena Kartashova (RUS)	Monika Michalik (POL)	Agoro Papavasiliu (GRE)
2007 Sofia	Stefanie Stüber (GER)	Alena Kartashova (RUS)	Monika Michalik (POL)
2007 Sofia	Stefanie Stüber (GER)	Alena Kartashova (RUS)	Hanna Vasylenko (UKR)
2008 Tampere	Alena Kartashova (RUS)	Volha Khilko (BLR)	Monika Michalik (POL)
2008 Tampere	Alena Kartashova (RUS)	Volha Khilko (BLR)	Marianna Sastin (HUN)
2009 Vilnius	Monika Michalik (POL)	Alena Kartashova (RUS)	Henna Johansson (SWE)
2009 Vilnius	Monika Michalik (POL)	Alena Kartashova (RUS)	Stefanie Stüber (GER)
2010 Baku	Lubov Volosova (RUS)	Audrey Prieto-Bokhashvili (FRA)	Yuliya Ostapchuk (UKR)
2010 Baku	Lubov Volosova (RUS)	Audrey Prieto-Bokhashvili (FRA)	Elina Vaseva (BUL)
2011 Dortmund	Yuliya Ostapchuk (UKR)	Taybe Yusein (BUL)	Inna Trazhukova (RUS)
2011 Dortmund	Yuliya Ostapchuk (UKR)	Taybe Yusein (BUL)	Olesya Zamula (AZE)
2012 Belgrade	Yuliya Ostapchuk (UKR)	Natalia Smirnova (RUS)	Monika Michalik (POL)
2012 Belgrade	Yuliya Ostapchuk (UKR)	Natalia Smirnova (RUS)	Elif Jale Yeşilırmak (TUR)
2013 Tbilisi	Anastasija Grigorjeva (LAT)	Monika Michalik (POL)	Hanna Beliayeva (AZE)
2013 Tbilisi	Anastasija Grigorjeva (LAT)	Monika Michalik (POL)	Ganna Vasylenko (UKR)
2014 Vantaa	Anastasija Grigorjeva (LAT)	Maryia Mamashuk (BLR)	Yuliya Ostapchuk (UKR)
2014 Vantaa	Anastasija Grigorjeva (LAT)	Maryia Mamashuk (BLR)	Dzhanan Manolova (BUL)
2015 Baku	Valeria Lazinskaya (RUS)	Yuliya Tkach (UKR)	Anastasija Grigorjeva (LAT)
2015 Baku	Valeria Lazinskaya (RUS)	Yuliya Tkach (UKR)	Maryia Mamashuk (BLR)
2016 Riga	Anastasija Grigorjeva (LAT)	Yuliya Tkach (UKR)	Inna Trazhukova (RUS)
2016 Riga	Anastasija Grigorjeva (LAT)	Yuliya Tkach (UKR)	Marianna Sastin (HUN)
2017 Novi Sad	Monika Michalik (POL)	Taybe Yusein (BUL)	Sara da Col (ITA)
2017 Novi Sad	Monika Michalik (POL)	Taybe Yusein (BUL)	Yuliya Tkach (UKR)
2018 Kaspiysk	Taybe Yusein (BUL)	Inna Trazhukova (RUS)	Ilona Prokopevniuk (UKR)
2018 Kaspiysk	Taybe Yusein (BUL)	Inna Trazhukova (RUS)	Veranika Ivanova (BLR)
2019 Bucharest	Taybe Yusein (BUL)	Aurora Campagna (ITA)	Tetiana Omelchenko (AZE)
2019 Bucharest	Taybe Yusein (BUL)	Aurora Campagna (ITA)	Marianna Sastin (HUN)
2020 Roma	Yuliya Tkach (UKR)	Inna Trazhukova (RUS)	Taybe Yusein (BUL)
2020 Roma	Yuliya Tkach (UKR)	Inna Trazhukova (RUS)	Tetiana Omelchenko (AZE)
2021 Warsaw	Iryna Koliadenko (UKR)	Marianna Sastin (HUN)	Veranika Ivanova (BLR)
2021 Warsaw	Iryna Koliadenko (UKR)	Marianna Sastin (HUN)	Katarzyna Mądrowska (POL)
2022 Budapest	Taybe Yusein (BUL)	Luisa Niemesch (GER)	Natalia Kubaty (POL)
2022 Budapest	Taybe Yusein (BUL)	Luisa Niemesch (GER)	Ilona Prokopevniuk (UKR)
2023 Zagreb	Iryna Koliadenko (UKR)	Grace Bullen (NOR)	Luisa Niemesch (GER)
2023 Zagreb	Iryna Koliadenko (UKR)	Grace Bullen (NOR)	Bilyana Dudova (BUL)
2024 Bucharest	Grace Bullen (NOR)	Luisa Niemesch (GER)	Veranika Ivanova (ANA)
2024 Bucharest	Grace Bullen (NOR)	Luisa Niemesch (GER)	Yuliya Tkach (UKR)

== Super middleweight ==
- 65 kg: 1987–

Tournament	Gold	Silver	Bronze
1988 Dijon	Heidi Kleven (NOR)	Dörthe Pedersen (NOR)	Marie-Line Meurisse (FRA)
1993 Ivanovo	Elmira Kurbanova (RUS)	Sylvie Thomé (FRA)	Nathalie Zengaffinnen (SUI)
1996 Oslo	Małgorzata Roguska (POL)	Elmira Kurbanova (RUS)	Sandra Gronert (GER)
2018 Kaspiysk	Petra Olli (FIN)	Elis Manolova (AZE)	Krystsina Fedarashka (BLR)
2018 Kaspiysk	Petra Olli (FIN)	Elis Manolova (AZE)	Henna Johansson (SWE)
2019 Bucharest	Elis Manolova (AZE)	Kriszta Incze (ROU)	Maria Kuznetsova (RUS)
2019 Bucharest	Elis Manolova (AZE)	Kriszta Incze (ROU)	Petra Olli (FIN)
2020 Roma	Mimi Hristova (BUL)	Elis Manolova (AZE)	Iryna Koliadenko (UKR)
2020 Roma	Mimi Hristova (BUL)	Elis Manolova (AZE)	Maria Kuznetsova (RUS)
2021 Warsaw	Irina Rîngaci (MDA)	Tetiana Rizhko (UKR)	Aleksandra Wólczyńska (POL)
2021 Warsaw	Irina Rîngaci (MDA)	Tetiana Rizhko (UKR)	Kriszta Incze (ROU)
2022 Budapest	Tetiana Rizhko (UKR)	Elis Manolova (AZE)	Kriszta Incze (ROU)
2023 Zagreb	Mimi Hristova (BUL)	Kriszta Incze (ROU)	Aleksandra Wolczyńska (POL)
2023 Zagreb	Mimi Hristova (BUL)	Kriszta Incze (ROU)	Tetiana Rizhko (UKR)
2024 Zagreb	Iryna Koliadenko (UKR)	Kateryna Zelenykh (ROU)	Irina Rîngaci (MDA)
2024 Zagreb	Iryna Koliadenko (UKR)	Kateryna Zelenykh (ROU)	Elis Manolova (AZE)

== Light heavyweight ==
- 70 kg: 1987–1996
- 68 kg: 1997–2001
- 67 kg: 2002–2013
- 69 kg: 2014–2017
- 68 kg: 2018–

Tournament	Gold	Silver	Bronze
1988 Dijon	Georgette Jean (FRA)	Kirsten Borgen (FRA)	None awarded
1993 Ivanovo	Natalia Lazarenko (RUS)	Evanguelía Nikolau (GRE)	Svetlana Yashkina (UKR)
1996 Oslo	Nina Englich (GER)	Yevgeniya Osipenko (RUS)	Lise Legrand (FRA)
1997 Warsaw	Anna Udycz (POL)	Nina Englich (UKR)	Nina Strasser (AUT)
1998 Bratislava	Ewelina Pruszko (POL)	Galina Ivanova (BUL)	Elmira Kurbanova (RUS)
1999 Götzis	Lise Legrand (FRA)	Ewelina Pruszko (POL)	Anita Schätzle (GER)
2000 Budapest	Lise Legrand (FRA)	Anita Schätzle (GER)	Anna Shamova (RUS)
2001 Budapest	Natalia Gavrilova (RUS)	Lise Legrand (FRA)	Anita Schätzle (GER)
2002 Seinäjoki	Lise Legrand (FRA)	Anita Schätzle (GER)	Anna Shamova (RUS)
2003 Riga	Lise Legrand (FRA)	Valeriya Zlatova (UKR)	Ewelina Pruszko (POL)
2004 Haparanda	Kateryna Burmistrova (UKR)	Lise Legrand (FRA)	Svetlana Martinenko (RUS)
2005 Varna	Kateryna Burmistrova (UKR)	Elena Perepelkina (RUS)	Lise Legrand (FRA)
2005 Varna	Kateryna Burmistrova (UKR)	Elena Perepelkina (RUS)	María Méndez (ESP)
2006 Moscow	Elena Perepelkina (RUS)	Kristine Orbova (LAT)	Agnieszka Wieszczek (POL)
2006 Moscow	Elena Perepelkina (RUS)	Kristine Orbova (LAT)	Iryna Tsyrkevich (BLR)
2007 Sofia	Anna Polovnena (RUS)	Kateryna Burmistrova (UKR)	Maria Müller (GER)
2007 Sofia	Anna Polovnena (RUS)	Kateryna Burmistrova (UKR)	Iryna Tsyrkevich (BLR)
2008 Tampere	Maryana Kvyatkovska (UKR)	Natalya Kuksina (RUS)	Hanna Beliayeva (BLR)
2008 Tampere	Maryana Kvyatkovska (UKR)	Natalya Kuksina (RUS)	Lise Golliot-Legrand (FRA)
2009 Vilnius	Kateryna Burmistrova (UKR)	Zumrud Gurbanhajiyeva (AZE)	Ralitsa Ivanova (BUL)
2009 Vilnius	Kateryna Burmistrova (UKR)	Zumrud Gurbanhajiyeva (AZE)	Yulia Bartnovskaia (RUS)
2010 Baku	Nadya Sementsova (AZE)	Kateryna Burmistrova (UKR)	Alena Kartashova (RUS)
2010 Baku	Nadya Sementsova (AZE)	Kateryna Burmistrova (UKR)	Iryna Tsyrkevich (BLR)
2011 Dortmund	Nadya Sementsova (AZE)	Alina Makhynia (UKR)	Yvonne Englich (GER)
2011 Dortmund	Nadya Sementsova (AZE)	Alina Makhynia (UKR)	Hanna Savenia (BLR)
2012 Belgrade	Hanna Johansson (SWE)	Alla Cherkasova (UKR)	Nadya Sementsova (AZE)
2012 Belgrade	Hanna Johansson (SWE)	Alla Cherkasova (UKR)	Dzhanan Manolova (BUL)
2013 Tbilisi	Alina Stadnyk (UKR)	Ilana Kratysh (ISR)	Aline Rotter-Focken (GER)
2013 Tbilisi	Alina Stadnyk (UKR)	Ilana Kratysh (ISR)	Svetlana Babushkina (RUS)
2014 Vantaa	Natalia Vorobieva (RUS)	Ilana Kratysh (ISR)	Laura Skujina (LAT)
2014 Vantaa	Natalia Vorobieva (RUS)	Ilana Kratysh (ISR)	Alina Makhynia (UKR)
2015 Baku	Alina Stadnyk (UKR)	Ilana Kratysh (ISR)	Natalia Vorobieva (RUS)
2015 Baku	Alina Stadnyk (UKR)	Ilana Kratysh (ISR)	Aline Rotter-Focken (GER)
2016 Riga	Maryia Mamashuk (BLR)	Ilana Kratysh (ISR)	Buse Tosun (TUR)
2016 Riga	Maryia Mamashuk (BLR)	Ilana Kratysh (ISR)	Alina Stadnyk (UKR)
2017 Novi Sad	Anastasia Bratchikova (RUS)	Maryia Mamashuk (BLR)	Alla Cherkasova (UKR)
2017 Novi Sad	Anastasia Bratchikova (RUS)	Maryia Mamashuk (BLR)	Koumba Larroque (FRA)
2018 Kaspiysk	Anastasia Bratchikova (RUS)	Koumba Larroque (FRA)	Buse Tosun (TUR)
2018 Kaspiysk	Anastasia Bratchikova (RUS)	Koumba Larroque (FRA)	Martina Kuenz (AUT)
2019 Bucharest	Alla Cherkasova (UKR)	Adéla Hanzlíčková (CZE)	Anastasija Grigorjeva (LAT)
2019 Bucharest	Alla Cherkasova (UKR)	Adéla Hanzlíčková (CZE)	Jenny Fransson (SWE)
2020 Roma	Khanum Velieva (RUS)	Dalma Caneva (ITA)	Danutė Domikaitytė (LTU)
2020 Roma	Khanum Velieva (RUS)	Dalma Caneva (ITA)	Alla Cherkasova (UKR)
2021 Warsaw	Koumba Larroque (FRA)	Khanum Velieva (RUS)	Adéla Hanzlíčková (CZE)
2021 Warsaw	Koumba Larroque (FRA)	Khanum Velieva (RUS)	Alina Berezhna (UKR)
2022 Budapest	Irina Rîngaci (MDA)	Pauline Lecarpentier (FRA)	Alla Belinska (UKR)
2022 Budapest	Irina Rîngaci (MDA)	Pauline Lecarpentier (FRA)	Natalia Strzalka (POL)
2023 Zagreb	Yuliana Yaneva (BUL)	Alla Belinska (UKR)	Nesrin Baş (TUR)
2023 Zagreb	Yuliana Yaneva (BUL)	Alla Belinska (UKR)	Koumba Larroque (FRA)
2024 Bucharest	Buse Tosun Çavuşoğlu (TUR)	Tetiana Rizhko (UKR)	Adéla Hanzlíčková (CZE)
2024 Bucharest	Buse Tosun Çavuşoğlu (TUR)	Tetiana Rizhko (UKR)	Mimi Hristova (BUL)

== First heavyweight ==
- 72 kg: 2018–

Tournament	Gold	Silver	Bronze
2018 Kaspiysk	Jenny Fransson (SWE)	Anastasiya Zimiankova (BLR)	Cynthia Vescan (FRA)
2018 Kaspiysk	Jenny Fransson (SWE)	Anastasiya Zimiankova (BLR)	Alexandra Anghel (ROU)
2019 Bucharest	Alina Berezhna (UKR)	Anna Schell (GER)	Tatiana Kolesnikova (RUS)
2020 Roma	Natalia Vorobieva (RUS)	Maria Selmaier (GER)	Cătălina Axente (ROU)
2020 Roma	Natalia Vorobieva (RUS)	Maria Selmaier (GER)	Alina Berezhna (UKR)
2021 Warsaw	Alla Belinska (UKR)	Yuliana Yaneva (BUL)	Evgenia Zakharchenko (RUS)
2021 Warsaw	Alla Belinska (UKR)	Yuliana Yaneva (BUL)	Dalma Caneva (ITA)
2022 Budapest	Anna Schell (GER)	Buse Tosun (TUR)	Yuliana Yaneva (BUL)
2022 Budapest	Anna Schell (GER)	Buse Tosun (TUR)	Kendra Dacher (FRA)
2023 Zagreb	Alexandra Anghel (ROU)	Buse Tosun (TUR)	Pauline Lecarpentier (FRA)
2023 Zagreb	Alexandra Anghel (ROU)	Buse Tosun (TUR)	Dalma Caneva (ITA)
2024 Bucharest	Nesrin Baş (TUR)	Alexandra Anghel (ROU)	Wiktoria Chołuj (POL)
2024 Bucharest	Nesrin Baş (TUR)	Alexandra Anghel (ROU)	Yuliana Yaneva (BUL)

== Heavyweight ==
- 75 kg: 1987–2001
- 72 kg: 2002–2013
- 75 kg: 2014–2017
- 76 kg: 2018–

Tournament	Gold	Silver	Bronze
1988 Dijon	Patricia Rossignol (FRA)	None awarded	None awarded
1993 Ivanovo	Yevgueniya Osipenko (RUS)	Tetyana Komarnytska (UKR)	Vanessa Civit (FRA)
1996 Oslo	Vanessa Civit (FRA)	Tetyana Komarnytska (UKR)	Monika Kowalska (POL)
1997 Warsaw	Monika Kowalska (POL)	Tetyana Komarnytska (UKR)	Anna Shamova (RUS)
1998 Bratislava	Nina Englich (GER)	Tetyana Komarnytska (UKR)	Monika Kowalska (POL)
1999 Götzis	Tetyana Komarnytska (UKR)	Elvira Barriga (AUT)	Elmira Kurbanova (RUS)
2000 Budapest	Tetyana Komarnytska (UKR)	Edyta Witkowska (POL)	Zarife Yıldırım (TUR)
2001 Budapest	Edyta Witkowska (POL)	Svetlana Martinenko (RUS)	Nina Englich (GER)
2002 Seinäjoki	Svetlana Martinenko (RUS)	Nina Englich (GER)	Svetlana Saenko (UKR)
2003 Riga	Anita Schätzle (GER)	Kateřina Hálová (CZE)	Monika Kowalska (POL)
2004 Haparanda	Guzel Manyurova (RUS)	Svetlana Saenko (UKR)	Anna Wawrzycka (POL)
2005 Varna	Anita Schätzle (GER)	Svetlana Martinenko (RUS)	Vasilisa Marzaliuk (BLR)
2005 Varna	Anita Schätzle (GER)	Svetlana Martinenko (RUS)	Stanka Zlateva (BUL)
2006 Moscow	Stanka Zlateva (BUL)	Svetlana Saenko (UKR)	Anita Schätzle (GER)
2006 Moscow	Stanka Zlateva (BUL)	Svetlana Saenko (UKR)	Karine Shadoyan (ARM)
2007 Sofia	Stanka Zlateva (BUL)	Svetlana Saenko (UKR)	Guzel Manyurova (RUS)
2007 Sofia	Stanka Zlateva (BUL)	Svetlana Saenko (UKR)	Agnieszka Wieszczek (POL)
2008 Tampere	Stanka Zlateva (BUL)	Guzel Manyurova (RUS)	Anita Schätzle (GER)
2008 Tampere	Stanka Zlateva (BUL)	Guzel Manyurova (RUS)	Jenny Fransson (SWE)
2009 Vilnius	Stanka Zlateva (BUL)	Alena Starodubtseva (RUS)	Agnieszka Wieszczek (POL)
2009 Vilnius	Stanka Zlateva (BUL)	Alena Starodubtseva (RUS)	Svetlana Saenko (UKR)
2010 Baku	Stanka Zlateva (BUL)	Ekaterina Bukina (RUS)	Emma Weberg (SWE)
2010 Baku	Stanka Zlateva (BUL)	Ekaterina Bukina (RUS)	Maider Unda (ESP)
2011 Dortmund	Kateryna Burmistrova (UKR)	Vasilisa Marzaliuk (BLR)	Stanka Zlateva (BUL)
2011 Dortmund	Kateryna Burmistrova (UKR)	Vasilisa Marzaliuk (BLR)	Agnieszka Wieszczek (POL)
2012 Belgrade	Maja Erlandsen (NOR)	Kateryna Burmistrova (UKR)	Natalia Vorobieva (RUS)
2012 Belgrade	Maja Erlandsen (NOR)	Kateryna Burmistrova (UKR)	Maider Unda (ESP)
2013 Tbilisi	Natalia Vorobieva (RUS)	Maider Unda (ESP)	Vasilisa Marzaliuk (BLR)
2013 Tbilisi	Natalia Vorobieva (RUS)	Maider Unda (ESP)	Kateryna Burmistrova (UKR)
2014 Vantaa	Stanka Zlateva (BUL)	Vasilisa Marzaliuk (BLR)	Ekaterina Bukina (RUS)
2014 Vantaa	Stanka Zlateva (BUL)	Vasilisa Marzaliuk (BLR)	Kateryna Burmistrova (UKR)
2015 Baku	Vasilisa Marzaliuk (BLR)	Ekaterina Bukina (RUS)	Maider Unda (ESP)
2015 Baku	Vasilisa Marzaliuk (BLR)	Ekaterina Bukina (RUS)	Svetlana Saenko (MDA)
2016 Riga	Yasemin Adar (TUR)	Alena Storodubtseva (RUS)	Vasilisa Marzaliuk (BLR)
2016 Riga	Yasemin Adar (TUR)	Alena Storodubtseva (RUS)	Alla Cherkasova (UKR)
2017 Novi Sad	Yasemin Adar (TUR)	Zsanett Németh (HUN)	Svetlana Saenko (MDA)
2017 Novi Sad	Yasemin Adar (TUR)	Zsanett Németh (HUN)	Epp Mäe (EST)
2018 Kaspiysk	Yasemin Adar (TUR)	Ekaterina Bukina (RUS)	Vasilisa Marzaliuk (BLR)
2018 Kaspiysk	Yasemin Adar (TUR)	Ekaterina Bukina (RUS)	Sabira Aliyeva (AZE)
2019 Bucharest	Yasemin Adar (TUR)	Martina Kuenz (AUT)	Zsanett Németh (HUN)
2019 Bucharest	Yasemin Adar (TUR)	Martina Kuenz (AUT)	Aline Rotter-Focken (GER)
2020 Roma	Ekaterina Bukina (RUS)	Yasemin Adar (TUR)	Aline Rotter-Focken (GER)
2020 Roma	Ekaterina Bukina (RUS)	Yasemin Adar (TUR)	Iselin Solheim (NOR)
2021 Warsaw	Epp Mäe (EST)	Natalia Vorobieva (RUS)	Cynthia Vescan (FRA)
2021 Warsaw	Epp Mäe (EST)	Natalia Vorobieva (RUS)	Aline Rotter-Focken (GER)
2022 Budapest	Yasemin Adar (TUR)	Epp Mäe (EST)	Enrica Rinaldi (ITA)
2022 Budapest	Yasemin Adar (TUR)	Epp Mäe (EST)	Bernadett Nagy (HUN)
2023 Zagreb	Yasemin Adar (TUR)	Martina Kuenz (AUT)	Cătălina Axente (ROU)
2023 Zagreb	Yasemin Adar (TUR)	Martina Kuenz (AUT)	Marion Bye (NOR)
2024 Bucharest	Yasemin Adar Yiğit (TUR)	Anastasiia Osniach (UKR)	Enrica Rinaldi (ITA)
2024 Bucharest	Yasemin Adar Yiğit (TUR)	Anastasiia Osniach (UKR)	Bernadett Nagy (HUN)

== All time medal table ==
As of 2024 European Wrestling Championships

Rank	Nation	Gold	Silver	Bronze	Total
1	Russia	61	36	49	146
2	Ukraine	33	45	46	124
3	France	21	14	35	70
4	Sweden	20	9	18	47
5	Azerbaijan	19	7	18	44
6	Bulgaria	15	13	22	50
7	Poland	14	15	36	65
8	Turkey	11	5	18	34
9	Belarus	9	12	25	46
10	Germany	7	18	33	58
11	Norway	6	10	9	25
12	Moldova	5	6	11	22
13	Austria	5	5	4	14
14	Romania	4	12	19	35
15	Latvia	4	3	3	10
16	Hungary	3	6	14	23
17	Finland	2	0	4	6
–	Individual Neutral Athletes (Note: At the 2024 European Championships, in accordance with sanctions imposed following by the 2022 Russian invasion of Ukraine, wrestlers from Russia and Belarus were not permitted to use the name, flag, or anthem of Russia or Belarus. They instead participated as "Individual Neutral Athletes (AIN)", their medals were not included in the official medal table.)	2	0	3	5
18	Greece	1	8	10	19
19	Estonia	1	1	1	3
20	Italy	0	5	12	17
21	Israel	0	4	0	4
22	Czech Republic	0	2	2	4
22	Great Britain	0	2	2	4
24	Spain	0	1	5	6
25	Netherlands	0	1	3	4
26	Belgium	0	1	0	1
26	Denmark	0	1	0	1
28	Armenia	0	0	1	1
28	Lithuania	0	0	1	1
28	Switzerland	0	0	1	1
Totals (30 entries)		243	242	405	890
