= 2005 World Wrestling Championships – Women's freestyle 55 kg =

Women's freestyle 55 kg at the 2005 World Championships
- Venue: László Papp Budapest Sports Arena
- Dates: 29 September 2005
- Competitors: 24 from 24 nations

Medalists
gold medal	Saori Yoshida	Japan
silver medal	Su Lihui	China
bronze medal	Natalia Golts	Russia
bronze medal	Tonya Verbeek	Canada

The women's freestyle 55 kilograms is a competition featured at the 2005 World Wrestling Championships, and was held at the László Papp Budapest Sports Arena in Budapest, Hungary on 29 September 2005.

This freestyle wrestling competition consists of a single-elimination tournament, with a repechage used to determine the winner of two bronze medals.

== Results ==
Legend

- F — Won by fall

=== Final ===
Final
Su Lihui (CHN)	0	0
Saori Yoshida (JPN)	3	3

=== Top half ===
Round of 32

Round of 16
Su Lihui (CHN)	8	7
Nadir Uğrun Perçin (TUR)	0	0
Lin Chia-hua (TPE)	0	0
Minerva Montero (ESP)	6	3^{F}
Natalia Golts (RUS)	6	5^{F}
Gudrun Høie (NOR)	0	0
Anna Gomis (FRA)	2	5
Birgit Stern (AUT)	0	0

Quarterfinals
Su Lihui (CHN)	0	2	3
Minerva Montero (ESP)	7	0	0
Natalia Golts (RUS)	0	1	1
Anna Gomis (FRA)	1	0	0

Semifinals
Su Lihui (CHN)	2	1
Natalia Golts (RUS)	1	0

=== Bottom half ===
Round of 32
Marcia Andrades (VEN)	4	0	1
Ludmila Cristea (MDA)	0	3	3
Mariya Yahorava (BLR)	1	2	0
Sofia Poumpouridou (GRE)	1	1	3
Kitti Godó (HUN)	0	2	0
Ana Maria Pavăl (ROM)	1	0	2
Saori Yoshida (JPN)	6	4^{F}
Neha Rathi (IND)	0	0
Sylwia Bileńska (POL)	5	3
Mariya Bavdyk (UKR)	0	1
Sabrina Esposito (ITA)	0	0
Jessica Bechtel (GER)	1	3
Tonya Verbeek (CAN)	6	2
Lee Na-lae (KOR)	0	0
Tina George (USA)	2	2
Naidangiin Otgonjargal (MGL)	0	1

Round of 16
Ludmila Cristea (MDA)	3	1
Sofia Poumpouridou (GRE)	1	0
Ana Maria Pavăl (ROM)	0
Saori Yoshida (JPN)	4^{F}
Sylwia Bileńska (POL)	0	1	0
Jessica Bechtel (GER)	2	1	1
Tonya Verbeek (CAN)	1	6
Tina George (USA)	0	0

Quarterfinals
Ludmila Cristea (MDA)	0	0
Saori Yoshida (JPN)	4	2
Jessica Bechtel (GER)	0	0
Tonya Verbeek (CAN)	2	7

Semifinals
Saori Yoshida (JPN)	3	1
Tonya Verbeek (CAN)	0	0

=== Repechage ===
Repechage round 1
Neha Rathi (IND)	0	0
Ana Maria Pavăl (ROM)	6	3

Repechage round 2
Nadir Uğrun Perçin (TUR)	1	0
Minerva Montero (ESP)	3	4
Ana Maria Pavăl (ROM)	0	0
Ludmila Cristea (MDA)	2	4^{F}

Bronze medals
Minerva Montero (ESP)	2	0
Natalia Golts (RUS)	3	4
Ludmila Cristea (MDA)	0	2
Tonya Verbeek (CAN)	6	9
