= 2001 World Wrestling Championships – Women's freestyle 56 kg =

Women's freestyle 56 kg at the 2001 World Championships
- Venue: Winter Sports Palace
- Dates: 22–24 November 2001
- Competitors: 19 from 19 nations

Medalists
gold medal	Seiko Yamamoto	Japan
silver medal	Lubov Volosova	Russia
bronze medal	Tetyana Lazareva	Ukraine

The women's freestyle 56 kilograms is a competition featured at the 2001 World Wrestling Championships, and was held at the Winter Sports Palace in Sofia, Bulgaria from 22 to 24 November 2001.

== Results ==
Legend

- F — Won by fall

=== Preliminary round ===
==== Pool 1 ====
Pos	Athlete	Pld	W	L	CP	TP	UKR	NOR	ESP
1	Tetyana Lazareva (UKR)	2	2	0	6	15	—	10–7	5–3
2	Gudrun Høie (NOR)	2	1	1	5	11	1–3 PP	—	4–0 Fall
3	Minerva Montero (ESP)	2	0	2	1	3	1–3 PP	0–4 TO	—

Source: Official website

==== Pool 2 ====
Pos	Athlete	Pld	W	L	CP	TP	TUR	POL	BUL
1	Zeynep Yıldırım (TUR)	2	2	0	6	10	—	5–2	5–0
2	Elżbieta Stryczek (POL)	2	1	1	4	8	1–3 PP	—	6–0
3	Petia Peneva (BUL)	2	0	2	0	0	0–3 PO	0–3 PO	—

Source: Official website

==== Pool 3 ====
Pos	Athlete	Pld	W	L	CP	TP	RUS	FRA	GER
1	Lubov Volosova (RUS)	2	2	0	6	10	—	7–4	3–0
2	Anna Gomis (FRA)	2	1	1	5	12	1–3 PP	—	8–0 Fall
3	Yvonne Hees (GER)	2	0	2	0	0	0–3 PO	0–4 TO	—

Source: Official website

==== Pool 4 ====
Pos	Athlete	Pld	W	L	CP	TP	SWE	CAN	NZL
1	Sara Eriksson (SWE)	2	2	0	7	9	—	2–0 Fall	7–1
2	Erica Sharp (CAN)	2	1	1	4	13	0–4 TO	—	13–0
3	Geraldine Roxburgh (NZL)	2	0	2	1	1	1–3 PP	0–4 ST	—

Source: Official website

==== Pool 5 ====
Pos	Athlete	Pld	W	L	CP	TP	KOR	VEN	BRA
1	Lee Na-lae (KOR)	2	2	0	7	12	—	4–2	8–0 Fall
2	Yoselin Rojas (VEN)	2	1	1	5	13	1–3 PP	—	11–0
3	Sheila Aparecida (BRA)	2	0	2	0	0	0–4 TO	0–4 ST	—

Source: Official website

==== Pool 6 ====
Pos	Athlete	Pld	W	L	CP	TP	JPN	CHN	USA	GRE
1	Seiko Yamamoto (JPN)	3	3	0	11	11	—	4–2	7–0 Fall	WO
2	Sun Dongmei (CHN)	3	2	1	9	17	1–3 PP	—	10–0	5–0 Fall
3	Erin Tomeo (USA)	3	1	2	3	6	0–4 TO	0–4 ST	—	6–2
4	Konstantina Tsimpanakou (GRE)	3	0	3	1	2	0–4 PA	0–4 TO	1–3 PP	—

Source: Official website

=== Knockout round ===
Quarterfinals
Tetyana Lazareva (UKR)	10
Zeynep Yıldırım (TUR)	0
Lubov Volosova (RUS)	4
Sara Eriksson (SWE)	2

Semifinals
Tetyana Lazareva (UKR)	2
Lubov Volosova (RUS)	4
Lee Na-lae (KOR)	0
Seiko Yamamoto (JPN)	5^{F}

Final
Lubov Volosova (RUS)	1
Seiko Yamamoto (JPN)	4
Bronze medal match
Tetyana Lazareva (UKR)	5
Lee Na-lae (KOR)	2
