= 2000 World Wrestling Championships – Women's freestyle 56 kg =

Women's freestyle 56 kg at the 2000 World Championships
- Venue: Universiada Hall
- Dates: 1–3 September 2000
- Competitors: 14 from 14 nations

Medalists
gold medal	Seiko Yamamoto	Japan
silver medal	Tetyana Lazareva	Ukraine
bronze medal	Jennifer Ryz	Canada

The women's freestyle 56 kilograms is a competition featured at the 2000 World Wrestling Championships, and was held at the Universiada Hall in Sofia, Bulgaria from 1 to 3 September 2000.

== Results ==
=== Preliminary round ===
==== Pool 1 ====
Pos	Athlete	Pld	W	L	CP	TP	TUN	ESP	BUL
1	Salma Ferchichi (TUN)	2	2	0	7	20	—	9–2	11–1
2	Minerva Montero (ESP)	2	1	1	4	13	1–3 PP	—	11–2
3	Desislava Lyubenova (BUL)	2	0	2	2	3	1–4 SP	1–3 PP	—

Source: Japan Wrestling

==== Pool 2 ====
Pos	Athlete	Pld	W	L	CP	TP	UKR	GRE	USA
1	Tetyana Lazareva (UKR)	2	2	0	6	11	—	7–1	4–3
2	Konstantina Tsimpanakou (GRE)	2	1	1	4	10	1–3 PP	—	9–6
3	Tina George (USA)	2	0	2	2	7	1–3 PP	1–3 PP	—

Source: Japan Wrestling

==== Pool 3 ====
Pos	Athlete	Pld	W	L	CP	TP	JPN	SWE	RUS	ESA
1	Seiko Yamamoto (JPN)	3	3	0	11	10	—	3–2	4–0 Fall	3–0 Fall
2	Sara Eriksson (SWE)	3	2	1	8	13	1–3 PP	—	1–0	10–0
3	Natalia Ivashko (RUS)	3	1	2	3	6	0–4 TO	0–3 PO	—	6–0
4	Zaira Martínez (ESA)	3	0	3	0	0	0–4 TO	0–4 ST	0–3 PO	—

Source: Japan Wrestling

==== Pool 4 ====
Pos	Athlete	Pld	W	L	CP	TP	CAN	PUR	VEN	TUR
1	Jennifer Ryz (CAN)	3	3	0	10	15	—	5–3	3–0	7–0 Fall
2	Mabel Fonseca (PUR)	3	2	1	8	23	1–3 PP	—	8–7	12–1
3	Yulianny Orellana (VEN)	3	1	2	5	20	0–3 PO	1–3 PP	—	13–3
4	Nadir Uğrun Perçin (TUR)	3	0	3	2	4	0–4 TO	1–4 SP	1–4 SP	—

Source: Japan Wrestling

=== Knockout round ===
Semifinals
Salma Ferchichi (TUN)	0
Tetyana Lazareva (UKR)	10
Seiko Yamamoto (JPN)	3
Jennifer Ryz (CAN)	2

Final
Tetyana Lazareva (UKR)	0
Seiko Yamamoto (JPN)	5
Bronze medal match
Salma Ferchichi (TUN)	0
Jennifer Ryz (CAN)	4
