= 1998 World Wrestling Championships – Women's freestyle 56 kg =

Women's freestyle 56 kg at the 1998 World Championships
- Venue: Hala Arena
- Dates: 8–10 October 1998
- Competitors: 14 from 14 nations

Medalists
gold medal	Gudrun Høie	Norway
silver medal	Anna Gomis	France
bronze medal	Sara Eriksson	Sweden

The women's freestyle 56 kilograms is a competition featured at the 1998 World Wrestling Championships, and was held in Poznań, Poland from 8 to 10 October 1998.

== Results ==
Legend

- DQ — Won by disqualification

=== Round 1 ===
	Score	
Round of 16
Cao Haiying (CHN)	0–6 Fall	Tetyana Lazareva (UKR)
Mariko Shimizu (JPN)	2–3	Diletta Giampiccolo (ITA)
Małgorzata Bassa (POL)	11–1 Fall	Minerva Montero (ESP)
Christina Oertli (GER)	1–4	Anna Gomis (FRA)
Natalia Ivashko (RUS)	3–0	Jennifer Ryz (CAN)
Kristina Lanskikh (UZB)	0–4 Fall	Sara Eriksson (SWE)
Gudrun Høie (NOR)	3–1	Tina George (USA)

=== Round 2 ===
	Score	
Quarterfinals
Tetyana Lazareva (UKR)	6–0	Diletta Giampiccolo (ITA)
Małgorzata Bassa (POL)	0–5 Fall	Anna Gomis (FRA)
Natalia Ivashko (RUS)	3–0	Sara Eriksson (SWE)
Gudrun Høie (NOR)		Bye
Repechage
Cao Haiying (CHN)	0–4 DQ	Mariko Shimizu (JPN)
Minerva Montero (ESP)	3–1	Christina Oertli (GER)
Jennifer Ryz (CAN)	10–0	Kristina Lanskikh (UZB)
Tina George (USA)		Bye

=== Round 3 ===
	Score	
Semifinals
Gudrun Høie (NOR)	3–0	Tetyana Lazareva (UKR)
Anna Gomis (FRA)	5–3	Natalia Ivashko (RUS)
Repechage
Tina George (USA)	0–6 Fall	Mariko Shimizu (JPN)
Minerva Montero (ESP)	2–5	Jennifer Ryz (CAN)
Diletta Giampiccolo (ITA)	2–7	Małgorzata Bassa (POL)
Sara Eriksson (SWE)		Bye

=== Round 4 ===
	Score	
Repechage
Sara Eriksson (SWE)	3–0	Mariko Shimizu (JPN)
Jennifer Ryz (CAN)	2–9	Małgorzata Bassa (POL)

=== Round 5 ===
	Score	
Repechage
Tetyana Lazareva (UKR)	0–0	Sara Eriksson (SWE)
Małgorzata Bassa (POL)	2–3	Natalia Ivashko (RUS)

=== Finals ===
	Score	
Bronze medal match
Sara Eriksson (SWE)	5–2	Natalia Ivashko (RUS)
Final
Gudrun Høie (NOR)	5–1 Fall	Anna Gomis (FRA)
