= 1999 World Wrestling Championships – Women's freestyle 56 kg =

Women's freestyle 56 kg at the 1999 World Championships
- Venue: Hildursborg
- Dates: 10–12 September 1999
- Competitors: 15 from 15 nations

Medalists
gold medal	Anna Gomis	France
silver medal	Mariko Shimizu	Japan
bronze medal	Gudrun Høie	Norway

The women's freestyle 56 kilograms is a competition featured at the 1999 World Wrestling Championships, and was held at the Stadium Hildursborg in Boden, Sweden from 10 to 12 September 1999.

== Results ==
Legend

- F — Won by fall

=== Preliminary round ===
==== Pool 1 ====
Pos	Athlete	Pld	W	L	CP	TP	CHN	USA	GER
1	Cao Haiying (CHN)	2	2	0	7	27	—	13–12	14–3
2	Tina George (USA)	2	1	1	5	21	1–3 PP	—	9–3 Fall
3	Tanja Sauter (GER)	2	0	2	1	6	1–4 SP	0–4 TO	—

Source: Official website

==== Pool 2 ====
Pos	Athlete	Pld	W	L	CP	TP	FRA	VEN	POL
1	Anna Gomis (FRA)	2	2	0	8	5	—	4–1 Fall	1–0 Ret
2	Nelisa Romero (VEN)	2	1	1	4	10	0–4 TO	—	9–1 Fall
3	Elżbieta Stryczek (POL)	2	0	2	0	1	0–4 PA	0–4 TO	—

Source: Official website

==== Pool 3 ====
Pos	Athlete	Pld	W	L	CP	TP	RUS	UKR	ITA
1	Natalia Ivashko (RUS)	2	2	0	7	12	—	3–1	9–0 Fall
2	Tetyana Lazareva (UKR)	2	1	1	5	8	1–3 PP	—	7–0 Fall
3	Angela Lattanzio (ITA)	2	0	2	0	0	0–4 TO	0–4 TO	—

Source: Official website

==== Pool 4 ====
Pos	Athlete	Pld	W	L	CP	TP	NOR	LAT	CAN
1	Gudrun Høie (NOR)	2	2	0	7	13	—	9–0 Fall	4–2
2	Biruta Ļičika (LAT)	2	1	1	4	3	0–4 TO	—	3–1 Fall
3	Breanne Graham (CAN)	2	0	2	1	3	1–3 PP	0–4 TO	—

Source: Official website

==== Pool 5 ====
Pos	Athlete	Pld	W	L	CP	TP	JPN	SWE	GRE
1	Mariko Shimizu (JPN)	2	2	0	7	6	—	3–0	3–0 Fall
2	Sara Eriksson (SWE)	2	1	1	4	4	0–3 PO	—	4–4 Fall
3	Konstantina Tsimpanakou (GRE)	2	0	2	0	4	0–4 TO	0–4 TO	—

Source: Official website

=== Knockout round ===
Quarterfinals
Cao Haiying (CHN)	0
Anna Gomis (FRA)	11
Natalia Ivashko (RUS)	0
Gudrun Høie (NOR)	2^{F}
Mariko Shimizu (JPN)	7^{F}
Tina George (USA)	1
Nelisa Romero (VEN)	1
Tetyana Lazareva (UKR)	7

Semifinals
Anna Gomis (FRA)	7
Gudrun Høie (NOR)	0
Mariko Shimizu (JPN)	3
Tetyana Lazareva (UKR)	1

Final
Anna Gomis (FRA)	4^{F}
Mariko Shimizu (JPN)	0
Bronze medal match
Gudrun Høie (NOR)	4
Tetyana Lazareva (UKR)	1
