= 1997 World Wrestling Championships – Women's freestyle 56 kg =

Women's freestyle 56 kg at the 1997 World Championships
- Venue: Clermont-Ferrand Sports Hall
- Dates: 10–12 July 1997
- Competitors: 14 from 14 nations

Medalists
gold medal	Anna Gomis	France
silver medal	Mariko Shimizu	Japan
bronze medal	Sara Eriksson	Sweden

The women's freestyle 56 kilograms is a competition featured at the 1997 World Wrestling Championships, and was at the Clermont-Ferrand Sports Hall held in Clermont-Ferrand, France from 10 to 12 July 1997.

== Results ==
=== Round 1 ===
	Score	
Round of 16
Anna Gomis (FRA)	10–0	Olga Lugo (VEN)
Daniela Amore (AUS)	0–5 Fall	Li Xiaoming (CHN)
Lin Chin-miao (TPE)	0–10	Sara Eriksson (SWE)
Mariko Shimizu (JPN)	3–0 Fall	Stephanie Murata (USA)
Tetyana Lazareva (UKR)	10–0	Salma Ferchichi (TUN)
Ine Barlie (NOR)	1–0	Christina Oertli (GER)
Angela Lattanzio (ITA)	0–4	Natalia Ivashko (RUS)

=== Round 2 ===
	Score	
Quarterfinals
Anna Gomis (FRA)	9–0 Fall	Li Xiaoming (CHN)
Sara Eriksson (SWE)	2–3	Mariko Shimizu (JPN)
Tetyana Lazareva (UKR)	1–4 Fall	Ine Barlie (NOR)
Natalia Ivashko (RUS)		Bye
Repechage
Olga Lugo (VEN)	7–0 Fall	Daniela Amore (AUS)
Lin Chin-miao (TPE)	8–1 Fall	Stephanie Murata (USA)
Salma Ferchichi (TUN)	0–5	Christina Oertli (GER)
Angela Lattanzio (ITA)		Bye

=== Round 3 ===
	Score	
Semifinals
Natalia Ivashko (RUS)	0–7 Fall	Anna Gomis (FRA)
Mariko Shimizu (JPN)	2–0	Ine Barlie (NOR)
Repechage
Angela Lattanzio (ITA)	0–6 Fall	Olga Lugo (VEN)
Lin Chin-miao (TPE)	1–5 Fall	Christina Oertli (GER)
Li Xiaoming (CHN)	0–4 Fall	Sara Eriksson (SWE)
Tetyana Lazareva (UKR)		Bye

=== Round 4 ===
	Score	
Repechage
Tetyana Lazareva (UKR)	0–4 Fall	Olga Lugo (VEN)
Christina Oertli (GER)	0–4	Sara Eriksson (SWE)

=== Round 5 ===
	Score	
Repechage
Natalia Ivashko (RUS)	5–0	Olga Lugo (VEN)
Sara Eriksson (SWE)	2–1	Ine Barlie (NOR)

=== Finals ===
	Score	
5th place match
Olga Lugo (VEN)	2–6	Ine Barlie (NOR)
Bronze medal match
Natalia Ivashko (RUS)	0–5	Sara Eriksson (SWE)
Final
Anna Gomis (FRA)	4–1	Mariko Shimizu (JPN)
