= 2002 World Wrestling Championships – Women's freestyle 59 kg =

Women's freestyle 59 kg at the 2002 World Championships
- Venue: Tasos Kampouris Hall
- Dates: 2–3 November 2002
- Competitors: 24 from 24 nations

Medalists
gold medal	Alena Kartashova	Russia
silver medal	Lotta Andersson	Sweden
bronze medal	Mabel Fonseca	Puerto Rico

The women's freestyle 59 kilograms is a competition featured at the 2002 World Wrestling Championships and was held at the Tasos Kampouris Hall in Chalcis, Greece from 2 to 3 November 2002.

== Results ==
=== Preliminary round ===
==== Pool 1 ====
Pos	Athlete	Pld	W	L	CP	TP	CAN	CHN	IND
1	Emily Richardson (CAN)	2	2	0	6	9	—	3–1	6–0
2	Yang Yanli (CHN)	2	1	1	4	9	1–3 PP	—	8–3
3	Alka Tomar (IND)	2	0	2	1	3	0–3 PO	1–3 PP	—

Source: Japan Wrestling

==== Pool 2 ====
Pos	Athlete	Pld	W	L	CP	TP	SWE	VEN	SUI
1	Lotta Andersson (SWE)	2	2	0	8	9	—	5–0 Fall	4–0 Fall
2	Yoselin Rojas (VEN)	2	1	1	4	10	0–4 TO	—	10–0
3	Nadia Meier (SUI)	2	0	2	0	0	0–4 TO	0–4 ST	—

Source: Japan Wrestling

==== Pool 3 ====
Pos	Athlete	Pld	W	L	CP	TP	GER	LAT	KAZ
1	Christina Oertli (GER)	2	2	0	6	12	—	5–0	7–0
2	Kristīne Odriņa (LAT)	2	1	1	3	4	0–3 PO	—	4–1
3	Madina Kurmangaliyeva (KAZ)	2	0	2	1	1	0–3 PO	1–3 PP	—

Source: Japan Wrestling

==== Pool 4 ====
Pos	Athlete	Pld	W	L	CP	TP	FRA	UKR	PER
1	Sandrine Sève (FRA)	2	2	0	8	19	—	7–2 Fall	12–1
2	Oxana Shalikova (UKR)	2	1	1	4	6	0–4 TO	—	4–0 Fall
3	Esther Mendoza (PER)	2	0	2	1	1	1–4 SP	0–4 TO	—

Source: Japan Wrestling

==== Pool 5 ====
Pos	Athlete	Pld	W	L	CP	TP	JPN	USA	MGL
1	Rena Iwama (JPN)	2	2	0	7	10	—	4–0	6–0 Fall
2	Lauren Lamb (USA)	2	1	1	3	3	0–3 PO	—	3–1
3	Dashjanchivyn Battsetseg (MGL)	2	0	2	1	1	0–4 TO	1–3 PP	—

Source: Japan Wrestling

==== Pool 6 ====
Pos	Athlete	Pld	W	L	CP	TP	PUR	ITA	KOR
1	Mabel Fonseca (PUR)	2	2	0	8	25	—	14–2	11–0
2	Silvia Menichetti (ITA)	2	1	1	4	6	1–4 SP	—	4–1
3	Kang Yoo-jin (KOR)	2	0	2	1	1	0–4 ST	1–3 PP	—

Source: Japan Wrestling

==== Pool 7 ====
Pos	Athlete	Pld	W	L	CP	TP	MEX	BUL	AUS
1	Virginia Mendoza (MEX)	2	2	0	7	15	—	5–0	10–0
2	Desislava Lyubenova (BUL)	2	1	1	4	7	0–3 PO	—	7–0 Fall
3	Carli Lewis (AUS)	2	0	2	0	0	0–4 ST	0–4 TO	—

Source: Japan Wrestling

==== Pool 8 ====
Pos	Athlete	Pld	W	L	CP	TP	RUS	GRE	ROM
1	Alena Kartashova (RUS)	2	2	0	7	15	—	8–2	7–0 Fall
2	Agoro Papavasileiou (GRE)	2	1	1	5	9	1–3 PP	—	7–1 Fall
3	Mirela Burnichi (ROM)	2	0	2	0	1	0–4 TO	0–4 TO	—

Source: Japan Wrestling

=== Knockout round ===
Quarterfinals
Emily Richardson (CAN)	0
Lotta Andersson (SWE)	4
Christina Oertli (GER)	3
Sandrine Sève (FRA)	6
Rena Iwama (JPN)	1
Mabel Fonseca (PUR)	4
Virginia Mendoza (MEX)	3
Alena Kartashova (RUS)	6

Semifinals
Lotta Andersson (SWE)	5
Sandrine Sève (FRA)	0
Mabel Fonseca (PUR)	2
Alena Kartashova (RUS)	5

Final
Lotta Andersson (SWE)	0
Alena Kartashova (RUS)	4
Bronze medal match
Sandrine Sève (FRA)	1
Mabel Fonseca (PUR)	3
