= Lee Na-lae =

South Korean freestyle wrestler

Personal information
- Full name: Lee Na-lae
- Nationality: South Korea
- Born: 1 January 1979 (age 47) Incheon, South Korea
- Height: 1.60 m (5 ft 3 in)
- Weight: 55 kg (121 lb)

Sport
- Style: Freestyle
- Club: Incheon City Hall
- Coach: Ahn Seung-mun
Medal record
Women's freestyle wrestling
Representing South Korea
Asian Games
Silver medal – second place	2002 Busan	55 kg
Asian Championships
Silver medal – second place	2004 Tokyo	55 kg
Bronze medal – third place	1999 Tashkent	56 kg
Bronze medal – third place	2003 Delhi	55 kg
Bronze medal – third place	2005 Wuhan	55 kg

Lee Na-lae (also Lee Na-rae, Korean: 이나래; born January 1, 1979) is a retired amateur South Korean freestyle wrestler, who competed in the women's lightweight category. She produced a remarkable tally of five career medals, including a silver in the 55-kg division at the 2002 Asian Games in Busan, South Korea, and then finished seventh at the 2004 Summer Olympics, representing her nation South Korea. Lee also trained throughout her sporting career as a member of Incheon City Hall's wrestling club, under her personal coach Ahn Seung-mun. Lee was born in Incheon, South Korea.

Lee highlighted her wrestling career when South Korea hosted the 2002 Asian Games in Busan. She picked up a silver medal in the inaugural women's 55 kg class, losing to her Japanese rival Saori Yoshida on technical superiority. She also boasted a bronze at the 2003 Asian Wrestling Championships in Delhi, India, but ended the same fate with another silver in a rematch against Yoshida by the following year, repeating their final in the process from the Asian Games.

When women's wrestling made its debut at the 2004 Summer Olympics in Athens, Lee qualified for her South Korean squad in the 55 kg class. Earlier in the process, she captured a gold medal over Italy's Diletta Giampiccolo from the inaugural Olympic Qualification Tournament in Tunis, Tunisia, and placed second behind Yoshida at the Asian Championships in Tokyo, Japan to guarantee her spot on South Korea's Olympic wrestling team. In the prelim pool, Lee lost her opening match 2–5 to France's Anna Gomis, but rallied her campaign to pin and upset Greece's Sofia Poumpouridou in front of the home crowd inside Ano Liossia Olympic Hall. Despite missing a spot for the semifinals, Lee seized her opportunity to determine a fifth spot against China's Sun Dongmei, but fell short in their classification match with a close 3–4 decision. Lee initially placed eighth in the final standings, but later upgraded to seventh, as Puerto Rico's Mabel Fonseca was disqualified from the tournament after being tested positive for stanozolol.
