= 1999 European Wrestling Championships =

- Host city: Sofia, Bulgaria Greco-Roman; Minsk, Belarus Freestyle
- Dates: 13 – 16 May 1999; 15 – 18 April 1999

Champions
- Freestyle: Russia
- Greco-Roman: Russia
- Women: France

The 1999 European Wrestling Championships were held in the Greco-Romane style in Sofia 13 – 16 May 1999; the men's Freestyle style in Minsk 15 – 18 April 1999, and the women's freestyle in Götzis 24 April – 1 May 1999.

== Medal table ==
Rank	Nation	Gold	Silver	Bronze	Total
1	Russia	7	3	5	15
2	Ukraine	4	3	1	8
3	Poland	2	4	0	6
4	Bulgaria	2	3	1	6
5	Turkey	2	1	1	4
6	France	2	0	1	3
7	Sweden	1	2	0	3
8	Austria	1	1	0	2
9	North Macedonia	1	0	0	1
10	Georgia	0	1	3	4
11	Italy	0	1	2	3
12	Greece	0	1	1	2
13	Hungary	0	1	0	1
13	Latvia	0	1	0	1
15	Germany	0	0	4	4
16	Armenia	0	0	1	1
16	Azerbaijan	0	0	1	1
16	Romania	0	0	1	1
Totals (18 entries)		22	22	22	66

== Medal summary ==
=== Men's freestyle ===
Event	Gold	Silver	Bronze
54 kg	Oleksandr Zakharuk; Ukraine	Leonid Chuchunov; Russia	Ivan Tsonov; Bulgaria
58 kg	Harun Doğan; Turkey	Michele Liuzzi; Italy	Otar Tushishvili; Georgia
63 kg	Elbrus Tedeyev; Ukraine	Serafim Barzakov; Bulgaria	Murad Umakhanov; Russia
69 kg	Zaza Zazirov; Ukraine	Velijan Alajverdiyev; Russia	Emzarios Bentinidis; Georgia
76 kg	Adam Saitiev; Russia	Alik Musayev; Ukraine	Alexander Leipold; Germany
85 kg	Magomed Ibragimov; North Macedonia	Igors Samušonoks; Latvia	Shamil Isayev; Russia
97 kg	Kuramagomed Kuramagomedov; Russia	Vadim Tasoyev; Ukraine	Eldar Kurtanidze; Georgia
130 kg	Andrey Shumilin; Russia	Aydın Polatçı; Turkey	Sven Thiele; Germany

=== Men's Greco-Roman ===
Event	Gold	Silver	Bronze
54 kg	Samvel Danielyan; Russia	Dariusz Jabłoński; Poland	Natig Eyvazov; Azerbaijan
58 kg	Armen Nazaryan; Bulgaria	Valery Nikonorov; Russia	Karen Mnatsakanyan; Armenia
63 kg	Włodzimierz Zawadzki; Poland	Akaki Chachua; Georgia	Şeref Eroğlu; Turkey
69 kg	Aleksey Glushkov; Russia	Ryszard Wolny; Poland	Biser Georgiev; Bulgaria
76 kg	Stoyan Stoyanov; Bulgaria	Tamás Berzicza; Hungary	Dimitrios Avramis; Greece
85 kg	Hamza Yerlikaya; Turkey	Martin Lidberg; Sweden	Aleksandr Menshchikov; Russia
97 kg	Mikael Ljungberg; Sweden	Ali Mollov; Bulgaria	Petru Sudureac; Romania
130 kg	Aleksandr Karelin; Russia	Anastasios Sofianidis; Greece	Giuseppe Giunta; Italy

=== Women's freestyle ===
Event	Gold	Silver	Bronze
46 kg	Inga Karamchakova; Russia	Yuliya Voitova; Ukraine	Farah Touchi; France
51 kg	Marta Wojtanowska; Poland	Yelena Yegoshina; Russia	Tanja Sauter; Germany
56 kg	Anna Gomis; France	Sara Eriksson; Sweden	Tetyana Lazareva; Ukraine
62 kg	Nikola Hartmann; Austria	Małgorzata Bassa-Roguska; Poland	Diletta Giampiccolo; Italy
68 kg	Lise Legrand; France	Ewelina Pruszko; Poland	Anita Schätzle; Germany
75 kg	Tetyana Komarnytska; Ukraine	Elvira Barriga; Austria	Elmira Kurbanova; Russia
