= 1999 World Wrestling Championships – Women's freestyle 51 kg =

Women's freestyle 51 kg at the 1999 World Championships
- Venue: Hildursborg
- Dates: 10–12 September 1999
- Competitors: 15 from 15 nations

Medalists
gold medal	Seiko Yamamoto	Japan
silver medal	Erica Sharp	Canada
bronze medal	Gao Yanzhi	China

The women's freestyle 51 kilograms is a competition featured at the 1999 World Wrestling Championships, and was held at the Stadium Hildursborg in Boden, Sweden from 10 to 12 September 1999.

== Results ==
Legend

- F — Won by fall

=== Preliminary round ===
==== Pool 1 ====
Pos	Athlete	Pld	W	L	CP	TP	RUS	LAT	UKR
1	Natalia Karamchakova (RUS)	2	2	0	7	7	—	3–0 Fall	4–3
2	Margarita Starikova (LAT)	2	1	1	3	6	0–4 TO	—	6–0
3	Inessa Rebar (UKR)	2	0	2	1	3	1–3 PP	0–3 PO	—

Source: Official website

==== Pool 2 ====
Pos	Athlete	Pld	W	L	CP	TP	USA	GER	POL
1	Stephanie Murata (USA)	2	2	0	8	17	—	11–5 Fall	6–0 Fall
2	Annett Kamke (GER)	2	1	1	4	14	0–4 TO	—	9–1 Fall
3	Marta Wojtanowska (POL)	2	0	2	0	1	0–4 TO	0–4 TO	—

Source: Official website

==== Pool 3 ====
Pos	Athlete	Pld	W	L	CP	TP	CAN	CHN	GRE
1	Erica Sharp (CAN)	2	2	0	7	6	—	6–5	WO
2	Gao Yanzhi (CHN)	2	1	1	5	18	1–3 PP	—	13–1
3	Agoro Papavasileiou (GRE)	2	0	2	1	1	0–4 EF	1–4 SP	—

Source: Official website

==== Pool 4 ====
Pos	Athlete	Pld	W	L	CP	TP	SWE	FRA	AUS
1	Ida Hellström (SWE)	2	2	0	7	5	—	2–1	3–0 Fall
2	Anne-Catherine Deluntsch (FRA)	2	1	1	5	6	1–3 PP	—	5–0 Fall
3	Amanda D'Rozario (AUS)	2	0	2	0	0	0–4 TO	0–4 TO	—

Source: Official website

==== Pool 5 ====
Pos	Athlete	Pld	W	L	CP	TP	JPN	VEN	ITA
1	Seiko Yamamoto (JPN)	2	2	0	8	10	—	7–2 Fall	3–0 Fall
2	Yulianny Orellana (VEN)	2	1	1	3	11	0–4 TO	—	9–3
3	Annalisa Debiasi (ITA)	2	0	2	1	3	0–4 TO	1–3 PP	—

Source: Official website

=== Knockout round ===
Quarterfinals
Natalia Karamchakova (RUS)	5
Stephanie Murata (USA)	6
Erica Sharp (CAN)	11
Ida Hellström (SWE)	2
Seiko Yamamoto (JPN)	3^{F}
Annett Kamke (GER)	0
Gao Yanzhi (CHN)	4
Anne-Catherine Deluntsch (FRA)	1

Semifinals
Stephanie Murata (USA)	3
Erica Sharp (CAN)	5
Seiko Yamamoto (JPN)	10
Gao Yanzhi (CHN)	0

Final
Erica Sharp (CAN)	4
Seiko Yamamoto (JPN)	6
Bronze medal match
Stephanie Murata (USA)	1
Gao Yanzhi (CHN)	2
