= Wrestling at the 2004 Summer Olympics – Women's freestyle 55 kg =

Women's freestyle 55 kg at the Games of the XXVIII Olympiad
- Venue: Ano Liosia Olympic Hall
- Date: 22–23 August 2004
- Competitors: 12 from 12 nations

Medalists
1st place, gold medalist(s)		Saori Yoshida	Japan
2nd place, silver medalist(s)		Tonya Verbeek	Canada
3rd place, bronze medalist(s)		Anna Gomis	France

The women's freestyle 55 kilograms at the 2004 Summer Olympics as part of the wrestling program were held at the Ano Liosia Olympic Hall, August 22 to August 23.

The competition held with an elimination system of three or four wrestlers in each pool, with the winners qualify for the semifinals and final by way of direct elimination.

== Schedule ==
All times are Eastern European Summer Time (UTC+03:00)

Date	Time	Event
22 August 2004	09:30	Round 1
22 August 2004	17:30	Round 2
22 August 2004	17:30	Round 3
23 August 2004	09:30	Semifinals
23 August 2004	17:30	Finals

== Results ==
=== Elimination pools ===
==== Pool 1 ====
Pos	Athlete	Pld	W	L	CP	TP	Qualification
1	Tonya Verbeek (CAN)	2	2	0	8	24	Semifinals
2	Tela O'Donnell (USA)	2	1	1	5	3	Classification 5–8
3	Olga Smirnova (RUS)	2	0	2	1	8	

Source: Official website

	Score		CP
Tela O'Donnell (USA)	2–5 Fall	Olga Smirnova (RUS)	4–0 TO
Tonya Verbeek (CAN)	11–1	Tela O'Donnell (USA)	4–1 SP
Olga Smirnova (RUS)	3–13	Tonya Verbeek (CAN)	1–4 SP

==== Pool 2 ====
Pos	Athlete	Pld	W	L	CP	TP	Qualification
1	Ida-Theres Karlsson (SWE)	2	1	1	5	6	Semifinals
2	Mabel Fonseca (PUR)	2	1	1	4	4	Classification 5–8
3	Tetyana Lazareva (UKR)	2	1	1	3	4	

Source: Official website

	Score		CP
Tetyana Lazareva (UKR)	4–2	Ida-Theres Karlsson (SWE)	3–1 PP
Mabel Fonseca (PUR)	4–0 Fall	Tetyana Lazareva (UKR)	4–0 TO
Ida-Theres Karlsson (SWE)	4–0 Fall	Mabel Fonseca (PUR)	4–0 TO

==== Pool 3 ====
Pos	Athlete	Pld	W	L	CP	TP	Qualification
1	Saori Yoshida (JPN)	2	2	0	8	21	Semifinals
2	Sun Dongmei (CHN)	2	1	1	3	4	Classification 5–8
3	Diletta Giampiccolo (ITA)	2	0	2	1	2	

Source: Official website

	Score		CP
Sun Dongmei (CHN)	4–2	Diletta Giampiccolo (ITA)	3–1 PP
Saori Yoshida (JPN)	11–0	Sun Dongmei (CHN)	4–0 ST
Diletta Giampiccolo (ITA)	0–10	Saori Yoshida (JPN)	0–4 ST

==== Pool 4 ====
Pos	Athlete	Pld	W	L	CP	TP	Qualification
1	Anna Gomis (FRA)	2	2	0	7	15	Semifinals
2	Lee Na-lae (KOR)	2	1	1	5	5	Classification 5–8
3	Sofia Poumpouridou (GRE)	2	0	2	0	2	

Source: Official website

	Score		CP
Anna Gomis (FRA)	5–2	Lee Na-lae (KOR)	3–1 PP
Sofia Poumpouridou (GRE)	0–10	Anna Gomis (FRA)	0–4 ST
Lee Na-lae (KOR)	3–2 Fall	Sofia Poumpouridou (GRE)	4–0 TO

=== Classification 5–8 ===
Qualification 5–6		Classification 5–6
Tela O'Donnell (USA)	7
Mabel Fonseca (PUR)	10	Mabel Fonseca (PUR)	8
Sun Dongmei (CHN)	4	Sun Dongmei (CHN)	6
Lee Na-lae (KOR)	3

=== Final round ===
Semifinals
Tonya Verbeek (CAN)	3
Ida-Theres Karlsson (SWE)	1
Saori Yoshida (JPN)	7
Anna Gomis (FRA)	6

Gold medal match
Tonya Verbeek (CAN)	0
Saori Yoshida (JPN)	6
Bronze medal match
Ida-Theres Karlsson (SWE)	0
Anna Gomis (FRA)	6

== Final standing ==
Rank	Athlete
1st place, gold medalist(s)	Saori Yoshida (JPN)
2nd place, silver medalist(s)	Tonya Verbeek (CAN)
3rd place, bronze medalist(s)	Anna Gomis (FRA)
4	Ida-Theres Karlsson (SWE)
5	Sun Dongmei (CHN)
6	Tela O'Donnell (USA)
7	Lee Na-lae (KOR)
8	Tetyana Lazareva (UKR)
9	Olga Smirnova (RUS)
10	Diletta Giampiccolo (ITA)
11	Sofia Poumpouridou (GRE)
DQ	Mabel Fonseca (PUR)

- Mabel Fonseca of Puerto Rico originally placed 5th, but was disqualified after she tested positive for Stanozolol.
