= Wrestling at the 2001 Mediterranean Games =

- Dates: 26 June–1 July

The Wrestling Competition at the 2001 Mediterranean Games was held in Tunis, Tunisia from June 26 to July 1, 2001.

== Medal table ==
Rank	Nation	Gold	Silver	Bronze	Total
1	Turkey	9	1	9	19
2	Greece	4	9	6	19
3	France	3	2	6	11
4	Tunisia	3	1	6	10
5	Egypt	2	3	4	9
6	Italy	1	1	3	5
7	Syria	0	3	3	6
8	Spain	0	1	2	3
9	FR Yugoslavia	0	1	1	2
10	Algeria	0	0	2	2
11	Croatia	0	0	1	1
Totals (11 entries)		22	22	43	87

== Medalists ==
=== Men's freestyle ===
Event	Gold	Silver	Bronze
54 kg	(Greece) Amiran Kardanof	(Syria) Firas Rifaei	(Turkey) Muhyettin Uzun (France) Didier Pais
58 kg	(Turkey) Tevfik Odabaşı	(Greece) Themistoklis Iakovidis	(Egypt) Hassan Aly Aboutaleb (Algeria) Mohamed Amine Benhamadi
63 kg	(Greece) Besik Aslanasvili	(Italy) Orazio Scafini	(Turkey) Ömer Çubukçu (Egypt) Ibrahim Hassanal-Osta
69 kg	(Turkey) Yüksel Şanlı	(Syria) Ahmad Al Ossta	(Greece) Theodoros Kemeridis (Tunisia) Jaber Dridi
76 kg	(Turkey) Fahrettin Özata	(Greece) Ioannis Athanasiadis	(Italy) Salvatore Rinella (Tunisia) Ibrahim Jabali
85 kg	(Turkey) Nuri Zengin	(Greece) Lazaros Loizidis	(Italy) Angelo Camarda (Tunisia) Mohamed Ali Bouzeine
97 kg	(Greece) Aftandil Xanthopoulos	(France) William Rombouts	(Turkey) Kasım Şakiroğlu (Syria) Jalal Baer
130 kg	(Turkey) Zekeriya Güçlü	(Egypt) Abdelwahab Hesham	(Greece) Theofilos Ampatzis (Syria) Adnan Hayek

=== Men's Greco-Roman ===
Event	Gold	Silver	Bronze
54 kg	(Turkey) Mücahit Vardal	(Egypt) Mohamed Abou El Ala	(France) Hamou Oubrick (Algeria) Mohamed Zoghbi
58 kg	(France) Djamel Ainaoui	(Socialist Federal Republic of Yugoslavia) Norbert Futo	(Egypt) Ashraf El Gharably (Spain) Abellan Martinez
63 kg	(Turkey) Bünyamin Emik	(Greece) Christos Gikas	(Syria) Zakaria Nashed (Tunisia) Mohamed Bargaoui
69 kg	(France) Christophe Guénot	(Syria) Yasser Saleh	(Turkey) Selahattin Güngör (Greece) Konstantinos Papadopoulos
76 kg	(Turkey) Taner Akbulut	(Greece) Alexios Kolitsopoulos	(Socialist Federal Republic of Yugoslavia) Dalibor Busic (Croatia) Robert Ribaric
85 kg	(Egypt) Ibrahim Mohamed	(Tunisia) Amor Bach Hamba	(Greece) Theofanis Anagnostou (Turkey) Çaglar Tekin
97 kg	(Egypt) Karam Gaber	(Greece) Konstantinos Thanos	(Turkey) Serkan Özden (France) Cedric Theval
130 kg	(Turkey) Yekta Yılmaz Gül	(Greece) Xenofon Koutsioumpas	(Tunisia) Omrane Ayari (Egypt) Abdelwahab Hesham

=== Women's freestyle ===
Event	Gold	Silver	Bronze
46 kg	(Tunisia) Fadhila Louati	(Greece) Agoro Papavasiliou	(France) Farah Touchi (Turkey) Ayşe Güneri
51 kg	(Greece) Sofia Poumpouridou	(Turkey) Nadir Uğrun Perçin	(Italy) Annalisa Debiasi (France) Vanessa Boubryemm
56 kg	(Tunisia) Salma Ferchichi	(Spain) Minerva Montero	(France) Anna Gomis (Greece) Ekaterini-Konstantina Tsibanakou
62 kg	(Italy) Diletta Giampiccolo	(Greece) Stavroula Zygouri	(Tunisia) Rim Garram (Turkey) Dilek Erdoğan
68 kg	(France) Lise Legrand	(Egypt) Yousria Magdy Elberhamy	(Spain) Unda Gonzales de Maider (Turkey) Eda Toraman
75 kg	(Tunisia) Saida Riabi	(France) Fanny Gay	(Greece) Maria Papageorgiou
