= 2000 World Wrestling Championships =

Wrestling championships in Freestyle for women

- Host city: Sofia, Bulgaria
- Dates: 1–3 September 2000
- Stadium: Universiada Hall

Champions
- Women: Japan

The 2000 Women's World Wrestling Championships were held in Sofia, Bulgaria from 1 to 3 September 2000.

== Medal table ==
Rank	Nation	Gold	Silver	Bronze	Total
1	Japan	2	1	2	5
2	Ukraine	1	1	0	2
2	United States	1	1	0	2
4	Canada	1	0	2	3
5	Austria	1	0	0	1
6	Russia	0	2	0	2
7	Poland	0	1	0	1
8	Germany	0	0	1	1
8	Sweden	0	0	1	1
Totals (9 entries)		6	6	6	18

== Team ranking ==
Rank	Women's freestyle	
Rank	Team	Points
1	Japan	48
2	Russia	34
3	Canada	31
4	Ukraine	27
5	United States	25
6	Germany	20
7	Poland	19
8	Sweden	18
9	France	13
10	Bulgaria	13

== Medal summary ==
Event	Gold	Silver	Bronze
46 kg	Iryna Melnik; Ukraine	Inga Karamchakova; Russia	Carol Huynh; Canada
51 kg	Hitomi Sakamoto; Japan	Patricia Miranda; United States	Ida Hellström; Sweden
56 kg	Seiko Yamamoto; Japan	Tetyana Lazareva; Ukraine	Jennifer Ryz; Canada
62 kg	Nikola Hartmann; Austria	Rena Iwama; Japan	Stéphanie Groß; Germany
68 kg	Kristie Marano; United States	Anna Shamova; Russia	Tomoe Miyamoto; Japan
75 kg	Christine Nordhagen; Canada	Edyta Witkowska; Poland	Kyoko Hamaguchi; Japan

== Participating nations ==
90 competitors from 24 nations participated.

- Austria (1)
- Bulgaria (6)
- Canada (6)
- Chinese Taipei (5)
- Czech Republic (3)
- El Salvador (3)
- Finland (1)
- France (3)
- Germany (5)
- Greece (3)
- Italy (1)
- Japan (6)
- Mexico (2)
- Norway (1)
- Poland (4)
- Puerto Rico (1)
- Russia (6)
- Spain (4)
- Sweden (4)
- Tunisia (2)
- Turkey (6)
- Ukraine (6)
- United States (6)
- Venezuela (5)

== See also ==
- Wrestling at the 2000 Summer Olympics
