= Tela O'Donnell =

American freestyle wrestler

Personal information
- Full name: Tela O'Donnell
- Born: July 16, 1982 (age 44) Homer, Alaska, U.S.
- Height: 1.62 m (5 ft 4 in)
- Weight: 55 kg (121 lb)

Sport
- Style: Freestyle
- Club: Dave Schultz Wrestling Club
- College team: Pacific University
- Coach: Terry Steiner

Tela O'Donnell (born July 16, 1982 in Homer, Alaska) is a retired amateur American freestyle wrestler, who competed in the women's lightweight category. She picked up the 2003 U.S. national runner-up trophy in her respective division, and later represented the United States team at the 2004 Summer Olympics in Athens, finishing sixth in the process. Throughout her sporting career, O'Donnell served full-time as a member of Dave Schultz Wrestling Club, and also became a resident athlete for the development program at the United States Olympic Training Center in Colorado Springs, Colorado.

== Career ==
=== Early years ===
O'Donnell began her sporting career at Homer High School in Homer, Alaska, where she lettered in football and volleyball. In her junior season, she officially joined the high school wrestling team under her coach Pat Daigle (Maine state champ) and assistant coach Jesse Caraway went on to set her own record as the second female wrestler to place in the state wrestling tournament. After graduating from high school in 2001, O'Donnell enrolled at Pacific University in Forest Grove, Oregon, where she competed on the women's wrestling team for an annual season.

In 2003, O'Donnell was selected to enter the United States Olympic Training Center in Colorado Springs, Colorado, where she had turned her sights to the women's wrestling squad under head coach Terry Steiner. Additionally, she attended classes part-time at the University of Colorado, taking up a bachelor of science degree in psychology.

=== Freestyle wrestling ===
O'Donnell blossomed her sporting career with a 121-pound title at the Women's University Championships in St. Joseph, Missouri. She set her sights to compete for the U.S. world wrestling squad, but missed a chance to grab a spot after her startling defeat from Tina George at the national trials.

O'Donnell entered the 2004 Summer Olympics in Athens on her major international debut in the women's 55 kg class. Earlier in the process, she grappled her way to pin and upset her longtime nemesis and two-time World silver medalist Tina George from the Olympic Trials, which guaranteed her a spot on the first ever U.S. women's wrestling squad. In the prelim pool, O'Donnell opened her match by pinning Russia's Olga Smirnova with less than two minutes left, but fell short behind Canada's Tonya Verbeek by a ten-point superiority limit (1–11). Despite missing a spot on the semifinals, O'Donnell seized her opportunity to compete against Puerto Rico's Mabel Fonseca in the classification round, but could not score enough points to grapple her opponent off the mat with a 7–10 decision. O'Donnell initially placed seventh in the final standings, but later upgraded to sixth, as Fonseca was disqualified from the tournament after being tested positive for stanozolol.
