= Sofia Poumpouridou =

Greek wrestler (born 1980)

Personal information
- Full name: Sofia Poumpouridou
- Nationality: Greece
- Born: 12 June 1980 (age 46) Lugovoye, Jambyl Region, Kazakh SSR, Soviet Union
- Height: 1.57 m (5 ft 2 in)
- Weight: 55 kg (121 lb)

Sport
- Style: Freestyle
- Club: Ephiridai Wrestling Club
- Coach: Andreas Hristodoulakis
Medal record
Women's freestyle wrestling
Representing Greece
Mediterranean Games
Gold medal – first place	2001 Tunis	51 kg
Bronze medal – third place	2005 Almería	55 kg
World Championships
Gold medal – first place	2002 Chalcis	51 kg
European Championships
Gold medal – first place	2001 Budapest	51 kg
Silver medal – second place	2003 Riga	51 kg
Bronze medal – third place	2007 Sofia	55 kg

Sofia Poumpouridou (Greek: Σοφία Πουμπουρίδου; born June 12, 1980, in Lugovoye, Jambyl Region, Soviet Union) is a retired amateur Greek freestyle wrestler, who competed in the women's lightweight category. Considered one of Europe's top female freestyle wrestlers in her decade, Poumpouridou has yielded a remarkable tally of six career medals, including two golds from the 2001 Mediterranean Games and 2002 World Wrestling Championships. She also had an opportunity to represent the host nation Greece at the 2004 Summer Olympics in Athens, finishing eleventh in the process. Throughout her sporting career, Poumpouridou trained full-time for Ephiridai Wrestling Club in Athens, under her personal coach Andreas Hristodoulakis.

Poumpouridou reached sporting headlines at the 2001 Mediterranean Games in Tunis, Tunisia, where she picked up the gold medal in the women's 51 kg class. When Greece hosted the 2002 World Wrestling Championships in Chalcis, Poumpouridou enchanted the home crowd in a spectacular fashion, as she overwhelmed Japan's Chiharu Icho 3–0 and ran off the mat with another gold in the same division.

When women's wrestling made its debut the 2004 Summer Olympics in Athens, Poumpouridou qualified for the Greek squad in the inaugural 55 kg class. She filled up an entry by the International Federation of Association Wrestling and the Hellenic Olympic Committee, as Greece received an automatic berth for being the host nation. Amassed the home crowd inside Ano Liossia Olympic Hall, Poumpouridou lost her opening match to France's Anna Gomis on technical superiority, and was wretchedly pinned by South Korea's Lee Na-lae that left her on the bottom of the prelim pool. Poumpouridou initially placed last out of twelve female wrestlers in the standings, but later upgraded to eleventh, as Puerto Rico's Mabel Fonseca was disqualified from the tournament after being tested positive for stanozolol.

In 2005, Poumpouridou missed her title defense with a bronze in the women's lightweight category (55 kg) at the Mediterranean Games in Almería, Spain to cap off her sporting career.
