= 2002 World Wrestling Championships =

Freestyle
- Host city: Tehran, Iran
- Dates: 5–7 September 2002
- Stadium: Azadi Indoor Stadium

Greco-Roman
- Host city: Moscow, Russia
- Dates: 20–22 September 2002
- Stadium: Universal Sports Hall CSKA

Women
- Host city: Chalcis, Greece
- Dates: 2–3 November 2002
- Stadium: Tasos Kampouris Hall

Champions
- Freestyle: Iran
- Greco-Roman: Russia
- Women: Japan

The following are the final results of the 2002 World Wrestling Championships. The 36th Men's Freestyle Competition was held in Tehran, Iran, while the 47th Men's Greco-Roman Competition was staged in Moscow, Russia and the 15th Women's Competition in Chalcis, Greece.

== Medal table ==
Rank	Nation	Gold	Silver	Bronze	Total
1	Russia	5	3	3	11
2	Japan	3	1	0	4
3	Sweden	2	2	2	6
4	Ukraine	2	0	3	5
5	Iran	1	2	3	6
6	Cuba	1	2	2	5
7	Georgia	1	1	1	3
7	United States	1	1	1	3
9	Bulgaria	1	0	1	2
9	Turkey	1	0	1	2
11	Armenia	1	0	0	1
11	Germany	1	0	0	1
11	Greece	1	0	0	1
14	Azerbaijan	0	2	0	2
15	Egypt	0	1	1	2
15	Poland	0	1	1	2
17	China	0	1	0	1
17	France	0	1	0	1
17	Hungary	0	1	0	1
17	Mongolia	0	1	0	1
17	Turkmenistan	0	1	0	1
22	Norway	0	0	1	1
22	Puerto Rico	0	0	1	1
Totals (23 entries)		21	21	21	63

== Team ranking ==
Rank	Men's freestyle		Men's Greco-Roman		Women's freestyle	
Rank	Team	Points	Team	Points	Team	Points
1	Iran	44	Russia	45	Japan	47
2	Russia	42	Georgia	27	Sweden	34
3	Cuba	35	Cuba	26	Russia	32
4	Ukraine	34	Bulgaria	22	Germany	27
5	Georgia	34	United States	22	Greece	26
6	Uzbekistan	19	Turkey	21	Poland	25
7	Germany	19	Sweden	20	Canada	24
8	Armenia	16	Egypt	17	Ukraine	21
9	Bulgaria	15	Uzbekistan	17	France	21
10	Azerbaijan	14	Armenia	16	China	20

== Medal summary ==
=== Men's freestyle ===
Event	Gold	Silver	Bronze
55 kg	René Montero; Cuba	Namig Abdullayev; Azerbaijan	Oleksandr Zakharuk; Ukraine
60 kg	Aram Margaryan; Armenia	Oyuunbilegiin Pürevbaatar; Mongolia	Mohammad Talaei; Iran
66 kg	Elbrus Tedeyev; Ukraine	Alireza Dabir; Iran	Zaur Botaev; Russia
74 kg	Mehdi Hajizadeh; Iran	Magomed Isagadzhiev; Russia	Volodymyr Syrotyn; Ukraine
84 kg	Adam Saitiev; Russia	Yoel Romero; Cuba	Majid Khodaei; Iran
96 kg	Eldar Kurtanidze; Georgia	Alireza Heidari; Iran	Vadim Tasoyev; Ukraine
120 kg	David Musulbes; Russia	Alexis Rodríguez; Cuba	Aydın Polatçı; Turkey

=== Men's Greco-Roman ===
Event	Gold	Silver	Bronze
55 kg	Geidar Mamedaliyev; Russia	Nepes Gukulow; Turkmenistan	Hassan Rangraz; Iran
60 kg	Armen Nazaryan; Bulgaria	Włodzimierz Zawadzki; Poland	Roberto Monzón; Cuba
66 kg	Jimmy Samuelsson; Sweden	Farid Mansurov; Azerbaijan	Manuchar Kvirkvelia; Georgia
74 kg	Varteres Samurgashev; Russia	Badri Khasaia; Georgia	Filiberto Azcuy; Cuba
84 kg	Ara Abrahamian; Sweden	Aleksandr Menshchikov; Russia	Mohamed Abdelfatah; Egypt
96 kg	Mehmet Özal; Turkey	Karam Gaber; Egypt	Ali Mollov; Bulgaria
120 kg	Dremiel Byers; United States	Mihály Deák-Bárdos; Hungary	Yury Patrikeyev; Russia

=== Women's freestyle ===
Event	Gold	Silver	Bronze
48 kg	Brigitte Wagner; Germany	Inga Karamchakova; Russia	Ida Hellström; Sweden
51 kg	Sofia Poumpouridou; Greece	Chiharu Icho; Japan	Natalia Golts; Russia
55 kg	Saori Yoshida; Japan	Tina George; United States	Ida-Theres Karlsson; Sweden
59 kg	Alena Kartashova; Russia	Lotta Andersson; Sweden	Mabel Fonseca; Puerto Rico
63 kg	Kaori Icho; Japan	Sara Eriksson; Sweden	Lene Aanes; Norway
67 kg	Kateryna Burmistrova; Ukraine	Lise Legrand; France	Kristie Marano; United States
72 kg	Kyoko Hamaguchi; Japan	Wang Xu; China	Edyta Witkowska; Poland

== Participating nations ==
=== Men's freestyle ===
183 competitors from 42 nations participated. The United States freestyle team did not participate due to security concerns.

- Armenia (5)
- Azerbaijan (5)
- Belarus (7)
- Brazil (2)
- Bulgaria (6)
- Canada (6)
- China (7)
- Cuba (7)
- Estonia (2)
- Finland (2)
- France (2)
- Georgia (7)
- Germany (6)
- Great Britain (1)
- Greece (7)
- Hungary (5)
- India (7)
- Iran (7)
- Iraq (3)
- Japan (7)
- Kazakhstan (5)
- Kyrgyzstan (3)
- Macedonia (3)
- Moldova (4)
- Mongolia (7)
- Netherlands (1)
- Peru (2)
- Poland (5)
- Romania (3)
- Russia (7)
- Senegal (3)
- Slovakia (2)
- South Korea (6)
- Spain (1)
- Switzerland (4)
- Tajikistan (1)
- Tunisia (1)
- Turkey (7)
- Turkmenistan (3)
- Ukraine (7)
- Uzbekistan (6)
- Venezuela (1)

=== Men's Greco-Roman ===
215 competitors from 51 nations participated.

- Armenia (6)
- Australia (1)
- Austria (1)
- Azerbaijan (3)
- Belarus (7)
- Bosnia and Herzegovina (1)
- Bulgaria (7)
- China (7)
- Chinese Taipei (3)
- Croatia (1)
- Cuba (7)
- Czech Republic (3)
- Denmark (3)
- Egypt (3)
- Estonia (4)
- Finland (6)
- France (6)
- Georgia (6)
- Germany (7)
- Greece (7)
- Hungary (7)
- Iran (4)
- Israel (4)
- Italy (2)
- Japan (6)
- Kazakhstan (6)
- Kyrgyzstan (5)
- Latvia (1)
- Lithuania (5)
- Mauritius (1)
- Moldova (2)
- Morocco (1)
- Norway (4)
- Peru (2)
- Poland (7)
- Portugal (1)
- Romania (5)
- Russia (7)
- Slovakia (2)
- South Korea (6)
- Spain (3)
- Sweden (6)
- Switzerland (2)
- Tunisia (1)
- Turkey (7)
- Turkmenistan (2)
- Ukraine (7)
- United States (7)
- Uzbekistan (7)
- Venezuela (3)
- Yugoslavia (3)

=== Women's freestyle ===
150 competitors from 34 nations participated.

- Australia (5)
- Austria (2)
- Belarus (3)
- Bulgaria (7)
- Canada (7)
- China (6)
- Czech Republic (1)
- France (6)
- Germany (7)
- Greece (7)
- Hungary (1)
- India (5)
- Italy (5)
- Japan (7)
- Kazakhstan (3)
- Latvia (1)
- Madagascar (1)
- Mexico (4)
- Mongolia (6)
- Norway (3)
- Peru (2)
- Poland (6)
- Puerto Rico (2)
- Romania (3)
- Russia (7)
- Senegal (3)
- South Korea (5)
- Spain (4)
- Sweden (4)
- Switzerland (3)
- Turkey (4)
- Ukraine (7)
- United States (7)
- Venezuela (6)
