= Diletta Giampiccolo =

Italian freestyle wrestler

Personal information
- Full name: Diletta Giampiccolo
- Nationality: Italy
- Born: 27 July 1974 (age 51) Catania, Italy
- Height: 1.56 m (5 ft 1 1/2 in)
- Weight: 55 kg (121 lb)

Sport
- Style: Freestyle
- Club: Polisportiva Mandraccio
- Coach: Lucio Caneva
Medal record
Women's freestyle wrestling
Representing Italy
Mediterranean Games
Gold medal – first place	2001 Tunis	62 kg
Gold medal – first place	2005 Almería	59 kg
World Championships
Silver medal – second place	2001 Sofia	62 kg
European Championships
Bronze medal – third place	1998 Bratislava	56 kg
Bronze medal – third place	1999 Götzis	62 kg
Bronze medal – third place	2005 Varna	59 kg

Diletta Giampiccolo (born July 27, 1974, in Catania) is a retired amateur Italian freestyle wrestler, who competed in the women's lightweight category. Considered one of Europe's top female freestyle wrestlers in her decade, Giampiccolo has claimed two gold medals at the Mediterranean Games (2001 and 2005), scored a silver in the 62-kg division at the 2001 World Wrestling Championships in Sofia, Bulgaria, and also finished tenth at the 2004 Summer Olympics, representing her nation Italy. Throughout her sporting career, Giampiccolo trained full-time for Polisportiva Mandraccio Wrestling Club in Genoa, under her personal coach Lucio Caneva.

Giampiccolo reached sporting headlines at the 2001 Mediterranean Games in Tunis, Tunisia, where she picked up the gold medal in the women's 62 kg class. Two months later, she captured the silver in the same class at the World Championships in Martigny, France, losing out to China's Meng Lili by a 3–0 verdict. Her sporting success continued to flourish at the next two World Championships, but she left both tournaments empty handed with mediocre results.

At the 2004 Summer Olympics in Athens, Giampiccolo qualified for the Italian squad in the women's 55 kg class. Earlier in the process, she finished second from the Olympic Qualification Tournament in Tunis, Tunisia to guarantee her place on the Italian wrestling team. She lost two straight matches each to China's Sun Dongmei with a 2–4 decision, and eventual Olympic champion Saori Yoshida of Japan on technical superiority that left her on the bottom of the prelim pool, placing eleventh in the final standings. With Puerto Rico's Mabel Fonseca being disqualified for failing the doping test on stanozolol, Giampiccolo upgraded her position to tenth.

In 2005, Giampiccolo campaigned her title defense in the women's lightweight category (59 kg) at the Mediterranean Games in Almería, Spain to cap off her sporting career, overpowering the host nation's Seba Jimenez in the process.
