= Ludmila Cristea =

Moldovan freestyle wrestler

Personal information
- Nationality: Moldova
- Born: 27 March 1986 (age 40) Ştefan Vodă, Moldavian SSR, Soviet Union
- Height: 1.65 m (5 ft 5 in)
- Weight: 55 kg (121 lb)

Sport
- Sport: Judo, wrestling
- Events: 57 kg (judo); Freestyle (wrestling)
- Coached by: Victor Peicov
Medal record
Women's freestyle wrestling
Representing Moldova
European Championships
Silver medal – second place	2006 Moscow	55 kg
Silver medal – second place	2008 Tampere	55 kg
Silver medal – second place	2011 Dortmund	55 kg
Bronze medal – third place	2012 Belgrade	55 kg

Ludmila Cristea (born 27 March 1986) is an amateur Moldovan freestyle wrestler, who played for the women's lightweight category. Since 2006, Cristea had won a total of four medals (three silver and one bronze) for the 55 kg class at the European Wrestling Championships.

At age fourteen, Cristea made her official debut, as a judoka, for the 2000 Summer Olympics in Sydney, where she competed in the women's lightweight category (57 kg). Unfortunately, she lost the first preliminary round match to Netherlands' Jessica Gal, who successfully scored a yuko, but incurred a penalty for playing outside the contest area, at four minutes.

Eight years after competing in her first Olympics, Cristea qualified for the women's 55 kg class this time, as a member of the Moldovan wrestling team, at the 2008 Summer Olympics in Beijing. She defeated Venezuela's Marcia Andrades in the preliminary round of sixteen, before losing out the quarterfinal match to Canadian wrestler and Olympic silver medalist Tonya Verbeek, who was able to score three points each in two straight periods, leaving Cristea without a single point.
