= Natalia Golts =

Russian freestyle wrestler

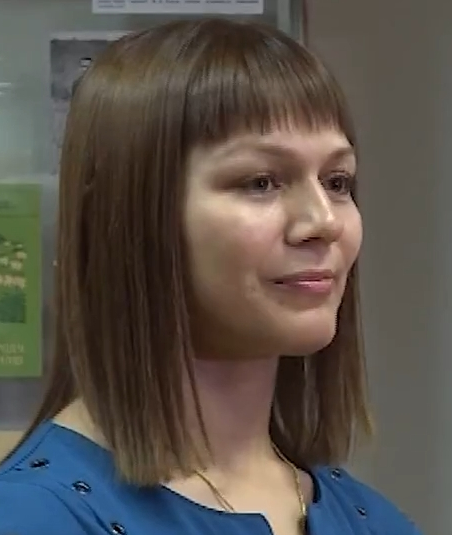
- Natalia Golts in December 2017

Personal information
- Full name: Nataliya Yuryevna Golts
- Nationality: Russia
- Born: 22 August 1985 (age 40) Monchegorsk, Murmansk Oblast, Russian SFSR
- Height: 1.64 m (5 ft 4 1/2 in)
- Weight: 55 kg (121 lb)

Sport
- Sport: Wrestling
- Event: Freestyle
- Club: Russian Army Sports Club
- Coached by: Omar Murtasaliev
Medal record
Women's freestyle wrestling
Representing Russia
World Championships
Silver medal – second place	2008 Tokyo	59 kg
Bronze medal – third place	2002 Chalcis	51 kg
Bronze medal – third place	2003 New York	55 kg
Bronze medal – third place	2005 Budapest	55 kg
Bronze medal – third place	2007 Baku	55 kg
Bronze medal – third place	Tashkent 2014	60 kg
European Championships
Gold medal – first place	2003 Riga	55 kg
Gold medal – first place	2005 Varna	55 kg
Gold medal – first place	2006 Moscow	55 kg
Gold medal – first place	2007 Sofia	55 kg
Gold medal – first place	2008 Tampere	55 kg
Silver medal – second place	2010 Baku	55 kg

Nataliya Yuryevna Golts (also Natalia Golts, Russian: Наталья Юрьевна Гольц; born August 22, 1985, in Monchegorsk, Murmansk Oblast) is an amateur Russian freestyle wrestler, who played for the women's lightweight category. Since 2002, Golts had won a total of five medals (one silver and four bronze) for the 51, 55 and 59 kg classes at the World Wrestling Championships. She is also a five-time European wrestling champion (2003, 2005–2008), a silver medalist at the 2010 European Wrestling Championships in Baku, Azerbaijan, and a member of Russian Army Sports Club in Moscow, under her personal coach Omar Murtasaliev.

Golts represented Russia at the 2008 Summer Olympics in Beijing, where she competed for the women's 55 kg class. She defeated Azerbaijan's Yelena Komarova in the preliminary round of sixteen, before losing out the quarterfinal match to Japanese wrestler and defending Olympic champion Saori Yoshida, who was able to score six points in two straight periods, leaving Golts with a single point. Because her opponent advanced further into the final match, Golts offered another shot for the bronze medal by entering the repechage bouts. She was defeated in the first round by Sweden's Ida-Theres Nerell, with a three-set technical score (1–0, 0–3, 1–0), and a classification point score of 1–3.
