= Mabel Fonseca =

Puerto Rican freestyle wrestler (born 1972)

Personal information
- Full name: Mabel Fonseca Ramírez
- Nationality: Puerto Rico
- Born: May 8, 1972 (age 54) Guantánamo, Cuba
- Height: 1.55 m (5 ft 1 in)
- Weight: 55 kg (121 lb)

Sport
- Style: Freestyle
- Club: Esporto San Juan
- Coach: Reinaldo Jimenez
Medal record
Women's freestyle wrestling
Representing Puerto Rico
Pan American Games
Bronze medal – third place	2003 Santo Domingo	63 kg
Bronze medal – third place	2007 Rio de Janeiro	55 kg
Central American and Caribbean Games
Silver medal – second place	2006 Cartagena	59 kg
World Championships
Bronze medal – third place	2002 Chalcis	59 kg

Mabel Fonseca Ramírez (born May 8, 1972) is a retired amateur Puerto Rican freestyle wrestler, who competed in the women's lightweight category. She produced a remarkable tally of four career medals; three of them were bronze from the Pan American Games (2003 and 2007) and World Championships and a silver in the 59-kg division from the 2006 Central American and Caribbean Games. Fonseca also had an opportunity to represent Puerto Rico at the 2004 Summer Olympics, but her participation had been marred by a disqualification for failing the doping test. Throughout her sporting career, Fonseca trained as a member of the women's wrestling team for Esporto San Juan under her personal coach Reinaldo Jimenez.

Fonseca highlighted her wrestling career at the 2002 World Wrestling Championships in Chalcis, Greece, where she picked up a bronze medal in the 59-kg division over France's Sandrine Seve, and then boasted for another one at the 2003 Pan American Games in Santo Domingo, Dominican Republic.

When women's wrestling made its debut at the 2004 Summer Olympics in Athens, Fonseca qualified as a lone wrestler for the Puerto Rican squad in the 55 kg class. Earlier in the process, she chose to drop down her weight class by four kilograms and thereby placed fifth from the 2003 World Wrestling Championships in New York City, New York, United States. In the prelim pool, Fonseca pinned Ukraine's Tetyana Lazareva in her opening match, but fell behind Sweden's Ida-Theres Karlsson with a similar disposition before reaching the minute mark. Despite missing a spot for the semifinals, Fonseca had a chance to edge past U.S. wrestler Tela O'Donnell 10–7, and China's Sun Dongmei 8–6 in overtime during the classification rounds. Fonseca originally claimed the fifth position, but was disqualified from the tournament after being tested positive for stanozolol, allowing other wrestlers behind her to upgrade their rankings.

Upon lifting her two-year suspension from anti-doping violation, Fonseca returned to the wrestling scene, and captured two more medals in the lightweight category at the 2006 Central American and Caribbean Games in Cartagena, Colombia, and at the 2007 Pan American Games in Rio de Janeiro, Brazil. She also vowed to improve her gaming strategy and sought to compete for the 2008 Summer Olympics, but missed a spot from the Olympic Qualification Tournament.
