= Seiko Yamamoto =

Martial artist from Japan

Seiko Yamamoto 山本 聖子
- Born: 22 August 1980 (age 46); Kawasaki, Kanagawa, Japan
- Native name: 山本 聖子
- Height: 5 ft 5 in (165 cm)

Other information
- Spouse: Hideaki Nagashima (m. 2006; div. 2014) Yu Darvish (m. 2016)

Seiko Yamamoto (山本 聖子, Yamamoto Seiko; born 22 August 1980) is a Japanese wrestler and submission grappler. She is a four time World Wrestling Champion, two time Asian Wrestling Champion and an ADCC Submission Wrestling World Championship medallist.

== Family ==
Her father is Ikuei Yamamoto, who also competed in the Olympics as a wrestler. Her older brother is mixed martial artist Norifumi Yamamoto. Her sister Miyuu Yamamoto is female wrestler and mixed martial artist who won three world titles and one Asian Wrestling Championship in her career.

== Wrestling career ==
In four years from 1999 till 2003, she collected four gold medals at the World Wrestling Championships. Because she lost at the Japan Queen's Cup to Saori Yoshida, she was unable to participate at the 2004 Summer Olympics. In 2007, she got married and briefly retired. In 2009 she returned to competition, and won a championship at the Poland Open.

== Submission wrestling ==
In 2013, she participated in the "submission fighting" competitions sponsored by the Abu Dhabi Combat Club. She was under-60 kg champion at the Tokyo ADCC trials. She won the under-60 kg bronze at the 2013 ADCC Submission Fighting World Championship.

== Coaching career ==
She was a coach with the US Women's Olympic Freestyle Wrestling Team before and during the 2016 Olympics.

== Personal life ==
In 2006 she married team handball player Hideaki Nagashima and briefly retired. In 2007 they had a son. They were divorced in 2014.

In 2014, she began a relationship with baseball pitcher Yu Darvish. On 29 July 2015, their son was born.

== Awards ==
- Tokyo Sports
  - Wrestling Special Award (1999, 2000, 2001, 2003)
