= Sun Dongmei =

Chinese wrestler (born 1983)

Sun Dongmei (simplified Chinese: 孙冬梅; traditional Chinese: 孫冬梅; pinyin: Sūn Dōngméi; born September 6, 1983) is a Chinese freestyle wrestler who placed sixth in the 55 kg competition at the 2004 Summer Olympics.
