= Tina George =

American freestyle wrestler

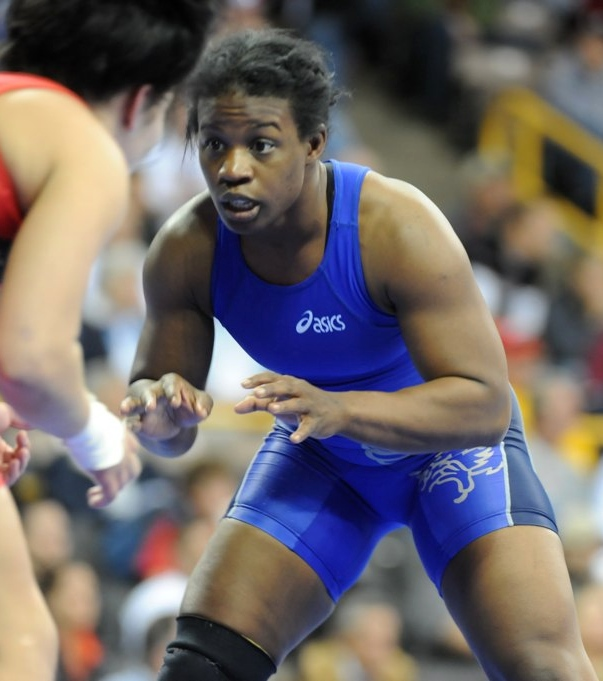
- George in 2012

Personal information
- Born: November 5, 1978 (age 47) Cleveland, Ohio, U.S.
- Height: 1.52 m (5 ft 0 in)
- Weight: 55 kg (121 lb)

Sport
- Sport: Freestyle wrestling
- Club: U.S. Army
- Coached by: Jason Loukides
Medal record
Women's freestyle wrestling
Representing the United States
World Wrestling Championships
Silver medal – second place	2002 Chalsis	-55 kg
Silver medal – second place	2003 New York	-55 kg
Pan American Games
Gold medal – first place	2003 Santo Domingo	-55 kg
Pan American Championships
Silver medal – second place	2001 Santo Domingo	-55 kg
Silver medal – second place	2003 Guatemala	-55 kg

Tina George (born November 5, 1978) is a retired American freestyle wrestler who won a gold medal at the 2003 Pan American Games. She was second at the 2002 and 2003 world championships, both times losing to Saori Yoshida.

George stopped competing after the 2008 U.S. Olympic Trials, and served 18 months with the U.S. Army in Iraq, where she was seriously wounded. She made a brief comeback for the 2012 U.S. Olympic Trials, and retired for good on April 22, 2014.
