= Sara Eriksson (wrestler) =

Swedish freestyle wrestler (born 1974)

Personal information
- Full name: Sara Anne Eriksson
- Nationality: Sweden
- Born: 23 January 1974 (age 52) Luleå, Sweden
- Height: 1.64 m (5 ft 4 1/2 in)
- Weight: 61 kg (134 lb)

Sport
- Style: Freestyle
- Club: Örgryte IS
- Coach: Pierre Dikanda
Medal record
Women's freestyle wrestling
Representing Sweden
World Championships
Gold medal – first place	1995 Atlanta	57 kg
Gold medal – first place	1996 Sofia	57 kg
Silver medal – second place	2002 Chalcis	63 kg
Bronze medal – third place	1994 Sofia	57 kg
Bronze medal – third place	1997 Clermont-Ferrand	56 kg
Bronze medal – third place	1998 Poznań	56 kg
European Championships
Gold medal – first place	1996 Oslo	57 kg
Gold medal – first place	2000 Budapest	57 kg
Gold medal – first place	2002 Seinäjoki	59 kg
Silver medal – second place	1998 Bratislava	56 kg
Silver medal – second place	1999 Götzis	56 kg
Bronze medal – third place	1997 Warsaw	57 kg
Bronze medal – third place	2003 Riga	63 kg
Bronze medal – third place	2004 Haparanda	63 kg

Sara Anne Eriksson (born 23 January 1974 in Luleå) is a retired amateur Swedish freestyle wrestler, who competed in the women's middleweight category. Considered one of the world's top female wrestlers of her decade, Eriksson has yielded a remarkable tally of fourteen career medals, including two golds at the World Championships (1995 and 1996) and three more at the European Championships (1996, 2000, and 2002). She also had an opportunity to compete for Sweden at the 2004 Summer Olympics, finishing tenth in the 63-kg division. Before her sporting career ended shortly after the Games, Eriksson trained as a member of the wrestling team for Örgryte Sporting Club (Swedish: Örgryte Idrottsällskap) in Gothenburg, under her personal coach and husband Pierre Dikanda.

Eriksson emerged herself into a sporting fame at the 1995 World Wrestling Championships in Atlanta, Georgia, United States, where she captured the gold medal over neighboring Norway's Lene Aanes in the 57-kg division. By the following year, she campaigned her title defense in the same tournament in Sofia, Bulgaria, and then boasted for another gold at the European Championships in Oslo, Norway. Before her major Olympic debut, Eriksson held a stunning combined record of thirteen medals; three of which came from the World Championships, and the rest from the European Championships, including two more golds to her career hardware. At the 2002 World Wrestling Championships in Chalcis, Greece, Eriksson overcame her six-year struggle to reach the final match in the 63-kg division, but settled only for the silver medal after being pinned by Japan's Kaori Icho.

When women's wrestling made its debut at the 2004 Summer Olympics in Athens, Eriksson qualified for the Swedish squad, as a 30-year-old veteran, in the 63 kg class. Earlier in the process, she earned an Olympic spot by taking second at the Olympic Qualification Tournament in Tunis, Tunisia after missing out a coveted place from the World Championships. Eriksson lost her opening match 3–0 to Germany's Stéphanie Groß, and followed it with a 3–5 thrashing from Greece's Stavroula Zygouri in front of the home crowd, leaving her on the bottom of the pool and placing tenth in the final standings.
