= Tetyana Lazareva =

Ukrainian freestyle wrestler (born 1981)

Tatyana Lazareva
Personal information
- Native name: Тетяна Вікторівна Лазарева
- Full name: Tetyana Viktorivna Lazareva
- Born: 4 July 1981 (age 45) Çärjew, Turkmen SSR, Soviet Union
- Occupations: Wrestler, psychologist
- Height: 5 ft 2 in (157 cm)
- Weight: 56 kg (123 lb)
Medal record
Representing Ukraine
Women's freestyle wrestling
World Championships
Silver medal – second place	2000 Sofia	56 kg
Silver medal – second place	2008 Tokyo	55 kg
Bronze medal – third place	2001 Sofia	56 kg
Bronze medal – third place	2011 Istanbul	55 kg
European Championships
Gold medal – first place	2001 Budapest	56 kg
Gold medal – first place	2002 Seinäjoki	56 kg
Silver medal – second place	2004 Haparanda	55 kg
Bronze medal – third place	1999 Götzis	56 kg
Bronze medal – third place	2008 Tampere	55 kg

Tetyana Viktorivna Lazareva (Ukrainian: Тетяна Вікторівна Лазарева; born 4 July 1981) is a Ukrainian female wrestler. She represented Ukraine at the 2012 Summer Olympics in women's freestyle 55 kg. She finished 5th after losing to Tonya Verbeek in the quarter-finals and to Jackeline Renteria in the repechage. She competed in the same weight category at the 2004 Summer Olympics.

Lazareva was coached by her husband, Grigori Shepelyev, with whom she has two sons – Aleksandr and Alexei.
