= Anna Gomis =

French wrestler (born 1973)

Personal information
- Born: 6 October 1973 (age 52) Tourcoing, France
Medal record
Women's freestyle wrestling
Representing France
Olympic Games
Bronze medal – third place	2004 Athens	55 kg
World Championships
Gold medal – first place	1993 Stavern	50 kg
Gold medal – first place	1996 Sofia	53 kg
Gold medal – first place	1997 Clermond-Ferrand	56 kg
Gold medal – first place	1999 Hildursborg	56 kg
Silver medal – second place	1994 Sofia	50 kg
Silver medal – second place	1998 Poznan	56 kg
Bronze medal – third place	1995 Moscow	57 kg
Bronze medal – third place	2010 Moscow	55 kg
European Championships
Gold medal – first place	1996 Oslo	53 kg
Gold medal – first place	1997 Warsaw	56 kg
Gold medal – first place	1998 Bratislava	56 kg
Gold medal – first place	1999 Goetzis	56 kg
Silver medal – second place	2005 Varna	55 kg
Bronze medal – third place	1993 Ivanovo	50 kg
Bronze medal – third place	2000 Budapest	56 kg
Bronze medal – third place	2006 Moscow	55 kg
Bronze medal – third place	2007 Sofia	55 kg
Mediterranean Games
Gold medal – first place	2005 Almería	55 kg
Bronze medal – third place	2001 Tunis	56 kg

Anna Gomis (born 6 October 1973) is a French wrestler who competed in the Women's Freestyle 55 kg at the 2004 Summer Olympics and won the bronze medal. She was named 1999 Female Wrestler of the Year by the International Federation of Associated Wrestling Styles, and is four times world champion.
