= List of World and Olympic Champions in women's freestyle wrestling =

Listed are wrestlers who were World or Olympic Champions in women's freestyle wrestling. The World Championships for women's freestyle wrestling first began in 1987. Women's freestyle wrestling at the Olympics first began in 2004. The World Championships takes place during non Olympic years. At the World Championships team scoring is kept, while no official team statistics are kept at the Olympics.

== World Level Champions in Women's Freestyle Wrestling by Year and Weight ==
=== 1987–1996 ===
Year	Team	44 kg	47 kg	50 kg	53 kg	57 kg	61 kg	65 kg	70 kg	75 kg
1987	(Norway)	(Belgium) Weigert, Brigette (1/1)	(Norway) Holten, Anne (1/2)	(Norway) Halvorsen, Anne Marie (1/1)	(France) Van Gucht, Sylvie (1/3)	(France) Dourthe, Isabelle (1/1)	(Norway) Barlie, Ine (1/2)	(France) Herlin, Brigitte (1/1)	(France) Jean, Georgette (1/2)	(France) Rossignol, Patricia (1/1)
1989	(Japan)	(Japan) Yoshimura, Shoko (1/5)	(Chinese Taipei) Ming-hsiu, Chen (1/1)	(Norway) Holten, Anne (2/2)	(France) Van Gucht, Sylvie (2/3)	(Norway) Høie, Gudrun (1/4)	(France) Sagon, Jocelyne (1/1)	(France) Blind, Emmanuelle (1/1)	(France) Jean, Georgette (2/2)	(Japan) Shimizu, Miyako (1/1)
1990	(Japan)	(Japan) Yoshimura, Shoko (2/5)	(Sweden) Pedersen, Åsa (1/1)	(France) Poupon, Martine (1/2)	(France) Van Gucht, Sylvie (3/3)	(Norway) Høie, Gudrun (2/4)	(France) Siffert, Brigitte (1/2)	(Japan) Iijima, Akiko (1/2)	(Japan) Iwama, Rika (1/1)	(Japan) Urano, Yayoi (1/6)
1991	(Japan)	(China) Zhong, Xiue (1/5)	(Japan) Yamamoto, Miyuu (1/3)	(France) Poupon, Martine (2/2)	(China) Zhnag, Xia (1/3)	(Venezuela) Lugo, Olga (1/1)	(France) Siffert, Brigitte (2/2)	(Japan) Iijima, Akiko (2/2)	(Japan) Urano, Yayoi (2/6)	(China) Liu, Dongfeng (1/5)
1992	(Japan)	(China) Pan, Yanping (1/1)	(China) Zhong, Xiue (2/5)	(United States) Saunders, Tricia (1/4)	(Venezuela) Izaguirre, Wendy (1/1)	(Japan) Sakamoto, Ryoko (1/1)	(Norway) Barlie, Ine (1/2)	(China) Wang, Chaoli (1/2)	(Venezuela) Guevara, Xiomara (1/1)	(China) Liu, Dongfeng (2/5)
1993	(Japan)	(Japan) Yoshimura, Shoko (3/5)	(China) Zhong, Xiue (3/5)	(France) Gomis, Anna (1/4)	(Norway) Johansen, Line (1/2)	(Norway) Høie, Gudrun (3/4)	(Austria) Hartmann, Nikola (1/5)	(China) Wang, Chaoli (2/2)	(Japan) Urano, Yayoi (3/6)	(China) Liu, Dongfeng (3/5)
1994	(Japan)	(Japan) Yoshimura, Shoko (4/5)	(Japan) Kamibayashi, Miho (1/1)	(Japan) Yamamoto, Miyuu (2/3)	(Japan) Kawasaki, Akemi (1/1)	(Norway) Johansen, Line (2/2)	(Austria) Hartmann, Nikola (2/5)	(Japan) Urano, Yayoi (4/6)	(Canada) Nordhagen, Christine (1/6)	(Japan) Funakoshi, Mitsuko (1/1)
1995	(Russia)	(Japan) Yoshimura, Shoko (5/5)	(Japan) Yamamoto, Miyuu (3/3)	(Russia) Ganachueva, Saniyat (1/1)	(France) Pluquet, Sophie (1/1)	(Sweden) Eriksson, Sara (1/2)	(Austria) Hartmann, Nikola (3/5)	(Japan) Urano, Yayoi (5/6)	(France) Golliot, Lise (1/2)	(China) Liu, Dongfeng (4/5)
1996	(Japan)	(China) Zhong, Xiue (4/5)	(United States) Saunders, Tricia (2/4)	(Russia) Smirnova, Olga (1/1)	(France) Gomis, Anna (2/4)	(Sweden) Eriksson, Sara (2/2)	(Japan) Miyazaki, Mikiko (1/1)	(Japan) Urano, Yayoi (6/6)	(Canada) Nordhagen, Christine (2/6)	(China) Liu, Dongfeng (5/5)

=== 1997–2001 ===
Year	Team	46 kg	51 kg	56 kg	62 kg	68 kg	75 kg
1997	(Japan)	(China) Zhong, Xiue (5/5)	(Poland) Piasecka, Joanna (1/1)	(France) Gomis, Anna (3/4)	(France) Golliot, Lise (2/2)	(Canada) Nordhagen, Christine (3/6)	(Japan) Hamaguchi, Kyoko (1/5)
1998	(Russia)	(United States) Saunders, Tricia (3/4)	(Japan) Shinomura, Atsuko (1/1)	(Norway) Høie, Gudrun (4/4)	(Austria) Hartmann, Nikola (4/5)	(Canada) Nordhagen, Christine (4/6)	(Japan) Hamaguchi, Kyoko (2/5)
1999	(United States)	(United States) Saunders, Tricia (4/4)	(Japan) Yamamoto, Seiko (1/4)	(France) Gomis, Anna (4/4)	(Japan) Shoda, Ayako (1/4)	(United States) Bacher, Sandra (1/1)	(Japan) Hamaguchi, Kyoko (3/5)
2000	(Japan)	(Ukraine) Merleni, Iryna (1/4)	(Japan) Sakamoto, Hitomi (1/9)	(Japan) Yamamoto, Seiko (2/4)	(Austria) Hartmann, Nikola (5/5)	(United States) Marano, Kristie (1/2)	(Canada) Nordhagen, Christine (5/6)
2001	(China)	(Ukraine) Merleni, Iryna (2/4)	(Japan) Sakamoto, Hitomi (2/9)	(Japan) Yamamoto, Seiko (3/4)	(China) Meng, Lili (1/2)	(Canada) Nordhagen, Christine (6/6)	(Poland) Witkowska, Edyta (1/1)

=== 2002–2003 ===
Year	Team	48 kg	51 kg	55 kg	59 kg	63 kg	67 kg	72 kg
2002	(Japan)	(Germany) Wagner, Brigitte (1/1)	(Greece) Poumpouridou, Sofia (1/1)	(Japan) Yoshida, Saori (1/16)	(Russia) Kartashova, Alena (1/1)	(Japan) Icho, Kaori (1/14)	(Ukraine) Burmistrova, Kateryna (1/1)	(Japan) Hamaguchi, Kyoko (4/5)
2003	(Japan)	(Ukraine) Merleni, Iryna (3/4)	(Japan) Icho, Chiharu (1/3)	(Japan) Yoshida, Saori (2/16)	(Japan) Yamamoto, Seiko (4/4)	(Japan) Icho, Kaori (2/14)	(United States) Marano, Kristie (2/2)	(Japan) Hamaguchi, Kyoko (5/5)

=== 2004 ===
Year	Team	48 kg	55 kg	63 kg	72 kg
2004	(Japan)	(Ukraine) Merleni, Iryna (4/4)	(Japan) Yoshida, Saori (3/16)	(Japan) Icho, Kaori (3/14)	(China) Wang, Xu (1/1)

=== 2005–2007 ===
Year	Team	48 kg	51 kg	55 kg	59 kg	63 kg	67 kg	72 kg
2005	(Japan)	(China) Ren, Xuecheng (1/1)	(Japan) Sakamoto, Hitomi (3/9)	(Japan) Yoshida, Saori (4/16)	(Japan) Shoda, Ayako (2/4)	(Japan) Icho, Kaori (4/14)	(China) Meng, Lili (2/2)	(United States) Smith, Iris (1/1)
2006	(Japan)	(Japan) Icho, Chiharu (2/3)	(Japan) Sakamoto, Hitomi (4/9)	(Japan) Yoshida, Saori (5/16)	(Japan) Shoda, Ayako (3/4)	(Japan) Icho, Kaori (5/14)	(China) Jing, Ruixue (1/2)	(Bulgaria) Zlateva, Stanka (1/5)
2007	(Japan)	(Japan) Icho, Chiharu (3/3)	(Japan) Sakamoto, Hitomi (5/9)	(Japan) Yoshida, Saori (6/16)	(France) Prieto, Audrey (1/1)	(Japan) Icho, Kaori (6/14)	(China) Jing, Ruixue (2/2)	(Bulgaria) Zlateva, Stanka (2/5)

=== 2008 ===
Year	Team	48 kg	55 kg	63 kg	72 kg
2008	(Japan)	(Canada) Huynh, Carol (1/1)	(Japan) Yoshida, Saori (7/16)	(Japan) Icho, Kaori (7/14)	(China) Wang, Jiao (1/1)

=== 2008–2011 ===
Year	Team	48 kg	51 kg	55 kg	59 kg	63 kg	67 kg	72 kg
2008	(Japan)	(United States) Chun, Clarissa (1/1)	(Japan) Sakamoto, Hitomi (6/9)	(Japan) Yoshida, Saori (8/16)	(Japan) Shoda, Ayako (4/4)	(Japan) Nishimaki, Mio (1/2)	(Canada) Dugrenier, Martine (1/3)	(Bulgaria) Zlateva, Stanka (3/5)
2009	(Azerbaijan)	(Azerbaijan) Stadnik, Mariya (1/2)	(Sweden) Mattsson, Sofia (1/1)	(Japan) Yoshida, Saori (9/16)	(Azerbaijan) Ratkevich, Yuliya (1/1)	(Japan) Nishimaki, Mio (2/2)	(Canada) Dugrenier, Martine (2/3)	(China) Qin, Xiaoqing (1/1)
2010	(Japan)	(Japan) Sakamoto, Hitomi (7/9)	(Ukraine) Kohut, Oleksandra (1/1)	(Japan) Yoshida, Saori (10/16)	(Mongolia) Battsetseg, Soronzonboldyn (1/2)	(Japan) Icho, Kaori (8/14)	(Canada) Dugrenier, Martine (3/3)	(Bulgaria) Zlateva, Stanka (4/5)
2011	(Japan)	(Japan) Obara, Hitomi (8/9)	(Russia) Rakhmanova, Zamira (1/1)	(Japan) Yoshida, Saori (11/16)	(Ukraine) Vasylenko, Hanna (1/1)	(Japan) Icho, Kaori (9/14)	(China) Xiluo, Zhuoma (1/1)	(Bulgaria) Zlateva, Stanka (5/5)

=== 2012 ===
Year	Team	48 kg	55 kg	63 kg	72 kg
2012	(Japan)	(Japan) Obara, Hitomi (9/9)	(Japan) Yoshida, Saori (12/16)	(Japan) Icho, Kaori (10/14)	(Russia) Vorobieva, Natalia (1/3)

=== 2012–2013 ===
Year	Team	48 kg	51 kg	55 kg	59 kg	63 kg	67 kg	72 kg
2012	(China)	(Belarus) Kaladzinskaya, Vanesa (1/2)	(Canada) MacDonald, Jessica (1/1)	(Japan) Yoshida, Saori (13/16)	(China) Zhang, Lan (1/1)	(United States) Pirozhkova, Elena (1/1)	(United States) Gray, Adeline (1/6)	(Sweden) Fransson, Jenny (1/1)
2013	(Japan)	(Japan) Tosaka, Eri (1/4)	(China) Sun, Yanan (1/1)	(Japan) Yoshida, Saori (14/16)	(Hungary) Sastin, Marianna (1/1)	(Japan) Icho, Kaori (11/14)	(Ukraine) Stadnyk, Alina (1/1)	(China) Zhang, Fengliu (1/1)

=== 2014–2017 ===
Year	Team	48 kg	53 kg	55 kg	58 kg	60 kg	63 kg	69 kg	75 kg
2014	(Japan)	(Japan) Tosaka, Eri (2/4)	(Japan) Yoshida, Saori (15/16)	(Japan) Hamada, Chiho (1/1)	(Japan) Icho, Kaori (12/14)	(Mongolia) Tserenchimed, Sükheegiin (1/1)	(Ukraine) Tkach, Yuliya (1/1)	(Germany) Focken, Aline (1/2)	(United States) Gray, Adeline (2/6)
2015	(Japan)	(Japan) Tosaka, Eri (3/4)	(Japan) Yoshida, Saori (16/16)	(United States) Maroulis, Helen (1/5)	(Japan) Icho, Kaori (13/14)	(Ukraine) Herhel, Oksana (3/3)	(Mongolia) Battsetseg, Soronzonboldyn (2/2)	(Russia) Vorobieva, Natalia (2/3)	(United States) Gray, Adeline (3/6)
2016	(Japan)	(Japan) Tosaka, Eri (4/4)	(United States) Maroulis, Helen (2/5)	(Japan) Mukaida, Mayu (1/4)	(Japan) Icho, Kaori (14/14)	(China) Pei, Xingru (1/1)	(Japan) Kawai, Risako (1/6)	(Japan) Dosho, Sara (1/2)	(Canada) Wiebe, Erica (1/1)
2017	(Japan)	(Japan) Susaki, Yui (1/6)	(Belarus) Kaladzinskaya, Vanesa (2/2)	(Japan) Okuno, Haruna (1/4)	(United States) Maroulis, Helen (3/5)	(Japan) Kawai, Risako (2/6)	(Mongolia) Orkhon, Pürevdorjiin (1/1)	(Japan) Dosho, Sara (2/2)	(Turkey) Adar, Yasemin (1/2)

=== 2018–2019 ===
Year	Team	50 kg	53 kg	55 kg	57 kg	59 kg	62 kg	65 kg	68 kg	72 kg	76 kg
2018	(Japan)	(Japan) Susaki, Yui (2/6)	(Japan) Okuno, Haruna (2/4)	(Japan) Mukaida, Mayu (2/4)	(China) Rong, Ningning (1/1)	(Japan) Kawai, Risako (3/6)	(Bulgaria) Yusein, Taybe (1/1)	(Finland) Olli, Petra (1/1)	(Ukraine) Cherkasova, Alla (1/1)	(Canada) Di Stasio, Justina (1/1)	(United States) Gray, Adeline (4/6)
2019	(Japan)	(Azerbaijan) Stadnik, Mariya (2/2)	(North Korea) Pak, Yong-mi (1/1)	(United States) Winchester, Jacarra (1/1)	(Japan) Kawai, Risako (4/6)	(Canada) Morais, Linda (1/1)	(Kyrgyzstan) Tynybekova, Aisuluu (1/3)	(Russia) Trazhukova, Inna (1/1)	(United States) Mensah-Stock, Tamyra (1/3)	(Russia) Vorobieva, Natalia (3/3)	(United States) Gray, Adeline (5/6)

=== 2021 ===
Year	Team	50 kg	53 kg	57 kg	62 kg	68 kg	76 kg
2021	(Japan)	(Japan) Susaki, Yui (3/6)	(Japan) Mukaida, Mayu (3/4)	(Japan) Kawai, Risako (5/6)	(Japan) Kawai, Yukako (1/1)	(United States) Mensah-Stock, Tamyra (2/3)	(Germany) Rotter-Focken, Aline (2/2)

=== 2021–2025 ===
Year	Team	50 kg	53 kg	55 kg	57 kg	59 kg	62 kg	65 kg	68 kg	72 kg	76 kg
2021	(Japan)	(Japan) Yoshimoto, Remina (1/1)	(Japan) Fujinami, Akari (1/3)	(Japan) Sakurai, Tsugumi (1/4)	(United States) Maroulis, Helen (4/5)	(Bulgaria) Dudova, Bilyana (1/1)	(Kyrgyzstan) Tynybekova, Aisuluu (2/3)	(Moldova) Rîngaci, Irina (1/1)	(Kyrgyzstan) Zhumanazarova, Meerim (1/1)	(Japan) Furuichi, Masako (1/1)	(United States) Gray, Adeline (6/6)
2022	(Japan)	(Japan) Susaki, Yui (4/6)	(United States) Parrish, Dominique (1/1)	(Japan) Shidochi, Mayu (4/4)	(Japan) Sakurai, Tsugumi (2/4)	(Moldova) Nichita, Anastasia (1/1)	(Japan) Ozaki, Nonoka (1/2)	(Japan) Morikawa, Miwa (1/2)	(United States) Mensah-Stock, Tamyra (3/3)	(United States) Elor, Amit (1/3)	(Turkey) Adar, Yasemin (2/2)
2023	(Japan)	(Japan) Susaki, Yui (5/6)	(Japan) Fujinami, Akari (2/3)	(Japan) Okuno, Haruna (3/4)	(Japan) Sakurai, Tsugumi (3/4)	(China) Zhang, Qi (1/1)	(Kyrgyzstan) Tynybekova, Aisuluu (3/3)	(Japan) Ozaki, Nonoka (2/2)	(Turkey) Tosun, Buse (1/1)	(United States) Elor, Amit (2/3)	(Japan) Kagami, Yuka (1/2)
2024	(Japan)	(United States) Hildebrandt, Sarah (1/1)	(Japan) Fujinami, Akari (3/3)	(Japan) Kiyooka, Moe (1/2)	(Japan) Sakurai, Tsugumi (4/4)	(Japan) Kawai, Risako (6/6)	(Japan) Motoki, Sakura (1/2)	(China) Long, Jia (1/2)	(United States) Elor, Amit (3/3)	(Japan) Ishii, Ami (1/2)	(Japan) Kagami, Yuka (2/2)
2024	(Japan)	(United States) Hildebrandt, Sarah (1/1)	(Japan) Fujinami, Akari (3/3)	(Japan) Kiyooka, Moe (1/2)	(Japan) Sakurai, Tsugumi (4/4)	(Japan) Kawai, Risako (6/6)	(Japan) Motoki, Sakura (1/2)	(China) Long, Jia (1/2)	(United States) Elor, Amit (3/3)	(Japan) Ishii, Ami (1/2)	(Japan) Kagami, Yuka (2/2)
2025	(Japan)	(North Korea) Won, Myong-gyong (1/1)	(Japan) Murayama, Haruna (4/4)	(North Korea) Oh, Kyong-ryong (1/1)	(United States) Maroulis, Helen (5/5)	(Japan) Onishi, Sakura (1/1)	(Japan) Motoki, Sakura (2/2)	(Japan) Morikawa, Miwa (2/2)	(Japan) Ishii, Ami (2/2)	(Ukraine) Belinska, Alla (1/1)	(Ecuador) Reasco, Génesis (1/1)
2026	(United States)	(Japan) Susaki, Yui (6/6)	(Japan) Kiyooka, Moe (2/2)	(United States) Leydecker, Everest (1/1)	(China) Hong, Kexin (1/1)	(India) Bhanwala, Manisha (1/1)	(United States) Nwachukwu, Adaugo (1/1)	(Russia) Kasabieva, Alina (1/1)	(China) Long, Jia (2/2)	(China) Li, Zelu (1/1)	(Ukraine) Alpyeyeva, Anastasiya (1/1)

== Individual Multiple-Time World Level Champions ==
=== 16 World Level Championships ===
(Japan) Saori Yoshida, 2002–2015

=== 14 World Level Championships ===
(Japan) Kaori Ichō, 2002–2016

=== 9 World Level Championships ===
(Japan) Hitomi Obara (Sakamoto), 2000–2012

=== 6 World Level Championships ===
(Japan) Yayoi Urano, 1990–1996

(Canada) Christine Nordhagen, 1994–2001

(United States) Adeline Gray, 2012–2021

(Japan) Risako Kawai, 2016–2024

(Japan) Yui Susaki, 2017–2026

=== 5 World Level Championships ===
(Japan) Shoko Yoshimura, 1989–1995

(China) Liu Dongfeng, 1991–1996

(China) Zhong Xiue, 1991–1997

(Austria) Nikola Hartmann, 1993–2000

(Japan) Kyōko Hamaguchi, 1997–2003

(Bulgaria) Stanka Zlateva, 2006–2011

(United States) Helen Maroulis, 2015–2025

== Team Championships ==
The list below includes unofficial championships won during the Olympic Games, although no official team statistics are kept during Olympic years.

=== 34 World Level Championships ===
(Japan) 1988–2025

=== 2 World Level Championships ===
(Russia) 1995–1998

(China) 2001–2012

(United States) 1999–2026

=== 1 World Level Championships ===
(Norway) 1987

(Azerbaijan) 2009

== See also ==
- List of Cadet, Junior, and Espoir World Champions in men's freestyle wrestling
- United States results in men's freestyle wrestling
- Soviet and Russian results in men's freestyle wrestling
- List of World and Olympic Champions in men's freestyle wrestling
- List of World and Olympic Champions in Greco-Roman wrestling
