= 2003 World Wrestling Championships – Women's freestyle 63 kg =

Women's freestyle 63 kg at the 2003 World Championships
- Venue: Madison Square Garden
- Dates: 12–14 September 2003
- Competitors: 27 from 27 nations

Medalists
gold medal	Kaori Icho	Japan
silver medal	Sara McMann	United States
bronze medal	Viola Yanik	Canada

The women's freestyle 63 kilograms is a competition featured at the 2003 World Wrestling Championships, and was held at the Madison Square Garden in New York, United States from 12 to 14 September 2003.

== Results ==
Legend

- F — Won by fall

=== Preliminary round ===
==== Pool 1 ====
Pos	Athlete	Pld	W	L	CP	TP	NOR	ESP	ESA
1	Lene Aanes (NOR)	2	2	0	8	20	—	12–0	8–0 Fall
2	Aurora Fajardo (ESP)	2	1	1	4	4	0–4 ST	—	4–0 Fall
3	Lil Canales (ESA)	2	0	2	0	0	0–4 TO	0–4 TO	—

Source: Official website

==== Pool 2 ====
Pos	Athlete	Pld	W	L	CP	TP	GER	IND	TUR
1	Stéphanie Groß (GER)	2	2	0	7	5	—	2–1	3–0 Fall
2	Geetika Jakhar (IND)	2	1	1	5	5	1–3 PP	—	4–0 Fall
3	Safiye Eroğlu (TUR)	2	0	2	0	0	0–4 TO	0–4 TO	—

Source: Official website

==== Pool 3 ====
Pos	Athlete	Pld	W	L	CP	TP	UKR	POL	VEN
1	Lyudmyla Holovchenko (UKR)	2	2	0	6	8	—	3–0	5–1
2	Małgorzata Bassa (POL)	2	1	1	3	3	0–3 PO	—	3–0
3	Xiomara Guevara (VEN)	2	0	2	1	1	1–3 PP	0–3 PO	—

Source: Official website

==== Pool 4 ====
Pos	Athlete	Pld	W	L	CP	TP	JPN	FRA	GRE
1	Kaori Icho (JPN)	2	2	0	7	14	—	10–0	4–0
2	Lise Legrand (FRA)	2	1	1	3	6	0–4 ST	—	6–0
3	Agoro Papavasileiou (GRE)	2	0	2	0	0	0–3 PO	0–3 PO	—

Source: Official website

==== Pool 5 ====
Pos	Athlete	Pld	W	L	CP	TP	BLR	AUT	BUL
1	Volha Khilko (BLR)	2	2	0	6	14	—	4–1	10–1
2	Nikola Hartmann (AUT)	2	1	1	4	4	1–3 PP	—	3–2
3	Galina Ivanova (BUL)	2	0	2	2	3	1–3 PP	1–3 PP	—

Source: Official website

==== Pool 6 ====
Pos	Athlete	Pld	W	L	CP	TP	ITA	KOR	BRA
1	Sabrina Esposito (ITA)	2	2	0	6	9	—	3–0	6–5
2	Hang Jin-young (KOR)	2	1	1	3	3	0–3 PO	—	3–2
3	Juliana Borges (BRA)	2	0	2	2	7	1–3 PP	1–3 PP	—

Source: Official website

==== Pool 7 ====
Pos	Athlete	Pld	W	L	CP	TP	CAN	HUN	TPE
1	Viola Yanik (CAN)	2	2	0	8	19	—	9–0 Fall	10–0
2	Adrienn Szabovik (HUN)	2	1	1	3	10	0–4 TO	—	10–5
3	Hung Hsiao-wei (TPE)	2	0	2	1	5	0–4 ST	1–3 PP	—

Source: Official website

==== Pool 8 ====
Pos	Athlete	Pld	W	L	CP	TP	USA	SWE	LAT
1	Sara McMann (USA)	2	2	0	8	20	—	9–2 Fall	11–0
2	Sara Eriksson (SWE)	2	1	1	3	7	0–4 TO	—	5–1
3	Kristīne Odriņa (LAT)	2	0	2	1	1	0–4 ST	1–3 PP	—

Source: Official website

==== Pool 9 ====
Pos	Athlete	Pld	W	L	CP	TP	RUS	CHN	CZE
1	Alena Kartashova (RUS)	2	2	0	6	12	—	5–3	7–0
2	Xu Haiyan (CHN)	2	1	1	5	7	1–3 PP	—	4–0 Fall
3	Michala Křížková (CZE)	2	0	2	0	0	0–3 PO	0–4 TO	—

Source: Official website

=== Knockout round ===
Round of 16
Lene Aanes (NOR)	3
Stéphanie Groß (GER)	0

Quarterfinals
Lene Aanes (NOR)	2
Lyudmyla Holovchenko (UKR)	6^{F}
Kaori Icho (JPN)	7^{F}
Volha Khilko (BLR)	0
Sabrina Esposito (ITA)	0
Viola Yanik (CAN)	5^{F}
Sara McMann (USA)	4
Alena Kartashova (RUS)	3

Semifinals
Lyudmyla Holovchenko (UKR)	0
Kaori Icho (JPN)	4
Viola Yanik (CAN)	0
Sara McMann (USA)	3^{F}

Final
Kaori Icho (JPN)	4
Sara McMann (USA)	3
Bronze medal match
Lyudmyla Holovchenko (UKR)	0
Viola Yanik (CAN)	6^{F}
