= 2001 World Wrestling Championships – Women's freestyle 62 kg =

Women's freestyle 62 kg at the 2001 World Championships
- Venue: Winter Sports Palace
- Dates: 23–25 November 2001
- Competitors: 20 from 20 nations

Medalists
gold medal	Meng Lili	China
silver medal	Diletta Giampiccolo	Italy
bronze medal	Lene Aanes	Norway

The women's freestyle 62 kilograms is a competition featured at the 2001 World Wrestling Championships, and was held at the Winter Sports Palace in Sofia, Bulgaria from 23 to 25 November 2001.

== Results ==
=== Preliminary round ===
==== Pool 1 ====
Pos	Athlete	Pld	W	L	CP	TP	CHN	JPN	USA
1	Meng Lili (CHN)	2	2	0	7	11	—	5–1 Fall	6–2
2	Rena Iwama (JPN)	2	1	1	3	6	0–4 TO	—	5–2
3	Sara McMann (USA)	2	0	2	2	4	1–3 PP	1–3 PP	—

Source: Official website

==== Pool 2 ====
Pos	Athlete	Pld	W	L	CP	TP	BLR	PUR	TUR
1	Volha Khilko (BLR)	2	2	0	8	17	—	3–0 Fall	14–1 Fall
2	Mabel Fonseca (PUR)	2	1	1	3	11	0–4 TO	—	11–5
3	Dilek Erdoğan (TUR)	2	0	2	1	6	0–4 TO	1–3 PP	—

Source: Official website

==== Pool 3 ====
Pos	Athlete	Pld	W	L	CP	TP	POL	VEN	MGL
1	Małgorzata Bassa (POL)	2	2	0	8	19	—	7–4 Fall	12–4 Fall
2	Raine Guerra (VEN)	2	1	1	4	4	0–4 TO	—	WO
3	Ochirbatyn Myagmarsüren (MGL)	2	0	2	0	4	0–4 TO	0–4 PA	—

Source: Official website

==== Pool 4 ====
Pos	Athlete	Pld	W	L	CP	TP	GER	SWE	BUL
1	Stéphanie Groß (GER)	2	2	0	6	10	—	3–1	7–5
2	Lotta Andersson (SWE)	2	1	1	5	5	1–3 PP	—	4–0 Fall
3	Iliana Selnichka (BUL)	2	0	2	1	5	1–3 PP	0–4 TO	—

Source: Official website

==== Pool 5 ====
Pos	Athlete	Pld	W	L	CP	TP	NOR	CAN	RUS	LAT
1	Lene Aanes (NOR)	3	3	0	11	13	—	5–0 Fall	4–1	4–0 Fall
2	Trish Leibel (CAN)	3	2	1	6	10	0–4 TO	—	4–0	6–3
3	Natalia Ivanova (RUS)	3	1	2	4	11	1–3 PP	0–3 PO	—	10–1
4	Kristīne Odriņa (LAT)	3	0	3	2	4	0–4 TO	1–3 PP	1–3 PP	—

Source: Official website

==== Pool 6 ====
Pos	Athlete	Pld	W	L	CP	TP	ITA	UKR	CZE	GRE
1	Diletta Giampiccolo (ITA)	3	3	0	11	24	—	11–0	10–0	3–1
2	Lyudmyla Holovchenko (UKR)	3	2	1	8	21	0–4 ST	—	11–0	10–6 Fall
3	Michala Křížková (CZE)	3	1	2	4	6	0–4 ST	0–4 ST	—	6–7 Fall
4	Stavroula Zygouri (GRE)	3	0	3	1	14	1–3 PP	0–4 TO	0–4 TO	—

Source: Official website

=== Knockout round ===
Quarterfinals
Meng Lili (CHN)	14
Volha Khilko (BLR)	3
Małgorzata Bassa (POL)	0
Stéphanie Groß (GER)	5

Semifinals
Meng Lili (CHN)	10
Stéphanie Groß (GER)	0
Lene Aanes (NOR)	3
Diletta Giampiccolo (ITA)	4

Final
Meng Lili (CHN)	4
Diletta Giampiccolo (ITA)	0
Bronze medal match
Stéphanie Groß (GER)	0
Lene Aanes (NOR)	3
