= 1997 World Wrestling Championships – Women's freestyle 62 kg =

Women's freestyle 62 kg at the 1997 World Championships
- Venue: Clermont-Ferrand Sports Hall
- Dates: 10–12 July 1997
- Competitors: 18 from 18 nations

Medalists
gold medal	Lise Golliot	France
silver medal	Stéphanie Groß	Germany
bronze medal	Małgorzata Bassa	Poland

The women's freestyle 62 kilograms is a competition featured at the 1997 World Wrestling Championships. It was held at the Clermont-Ferrand Sports Hall in Clermont-Ferrand, France, from 10 to 12 July 1997.

== Results ==
=== Round 1 ===
	Score	
Round of 32
Celia Derham (AUS)	3–0 Fall	Donka Dimova (BUL)
Nikola Hartmann (AUT)	2–4	Lauren Wolfe (USA)
Kim Bergey (CAN)	9–0 Fall	Rim Garram (TUN)
Stéphanie Groß (GER)	4–3	Lyudmyla Holovchenko (UKR)
Stavroula Zygouri (GRE)	6–4	Natalia Vinogradova (RUS)
Lene Aanes (NOR)	5–0	Huang Wan-ling (TPE)
Dagmar Skácelová (CZE)	0–7 Fall	Lise Golliot (FRA)
Małgorzata Bassa (POL)	1–3	Mikiko Miyazaki (JPN)
Diletta Giampiccolo (ITA)	1–3	Wendy Izaguirre (VEN)

=== Round 2 ===
	Score	
Round of 16
Celia Derham (AUS)	4–9	Lauren Wolfe (USA)
Kim Bergey (CAN)	0–7	Stéphanie Groß (GER)
Stavroula Zygouri (GRE)	3–8	Lene Aanes (NOR)
Lise Golliot (FRA)	4–3	Mikiko Miyazaki (JPN)
Wendy Izaguirre (VEN)		Bye
Repechage
Donka Dimova (BUL)	0–11	Nikola Hartmann (AUT)
Rim Garram (TUN)	2–3	Lyudmyla Holovchenko (UKR)
Natalia Vinogradova (RUS)	4–0	Huang Wan-ling (TPE)
Dagmar Skácelová (CZE)	3–8	Małgorzata Bassa (POL)
Diletta Giampiccolo (ITA)		Bye

=== Round 3 ===
	Score	
Quarterfinals
Wendy Izaguirre (VEN)	0–1	Lauren Wolfe (USA)
Stéphanie Groß (GER)		Bye
Lene Aanes (NOR)		Bye
Lise Golliot (FRA)		Bye
Repechage
Diletta Giampiccolo (ITA)	0–3	Nikola Hartmann (AUT)
Lyudmyla Holovchenko (UKR)	0–4	Natalia Vinogradova (RUS)
Małgorzata Bassa (POL)	4–0 Fall	Celia Derham (AUS)
Kim Bergey (CAN)	8–0 Fall	Stavroula Zygouri (GRE)
Mikiko Miyazaki (JPN)		Bye

=== Round 4 ===
	Score	
Semifinals
Lauren Wolfe (USA)	0–3	Stéphanie Groß (GER)
Lene Aanes (NOR)	2–2	Lise Golliot (FRA)
Repechage
Mikiko Miyazaki (JPN)	3–0	Nikola Hartmann (AUT)
Natalia Vinogradova (RUS)	0–3 Fall	Małgorzata Bassa (POL)
Kim Bergey (CAN)	6–3	Wendy Izaguirre (VEN)

=== Round 5 ===
	Score	
Repechage
Mikiko Miyazaki (JPN)	0–3	Kim Bergey (CAN)
Małgorzata Bassa (POL)		Bye

=== Round 6 ===
	Score	
Repechage
Lauren Wolfe (USA)	2–6	Małgorzata Bassa (POL)
Kim Bergey (CAN)	0–4 Fall	Lene Aanes (NOR)

=== Finals ===
	Score	
5th place match
Lauren Wolfe (USA)	1–0	Kim Bergey (CAN)
Bronze medal match
Małgorzata Bassa (POL)	4–0	Lene Aanes (NOR)
Final
Stéphanie Groß (GER)	0–1	Lise Golliot (FRA)
