= 2002 World Wrestling Championships – Women's freestyle 63 kg =

Women's freestyle 63 kg at the 2002 World Championships
- Venue: Tasos Kampouris Hall
- Dates: 2–3 November 2002
- Competitors: 23 from 23 nations

Medalists
gold medal	Kaori Icho	Japan
silver medal	Sara Eriksson	Sweden
bronze medal	Lene Aanes	Norway

The women's freestyle 63 kilograms is a competition featured at the 2002 World Wrestling Championships, and was held at the Tasos Kampouris Hall in Chalcis, Greece from 2 to 3 November 2002.

== Results ==
Legend

- F — Won by fall

=== Preliminary round ===
==== Pool 1 ====
Pos	Athlete	Pld	W	L	CP	TP	GER	MEX	GRE
1	Stéphanie Groß (GER)	2	2	0	8	11	—	7–0 Fall	4–0 Fall
2	Jacqueline Reynoso (MEX)	2	1	1	3	4	0–4 TO	—	4–2
3	Agapi Christodoulaki (GRE)	2	0	2	1	2	0–4 TO	1–3 PP	—

Source: Japan Wrestling

==== Pool 2 ====
Pos	Athlete	Pld	W	L	CP	TP	NOR	RUS	ITA
1	Lene Aanes (NOR)	2	2	0	8	8	—	4–0 Fall	4–0 Fall
2	Anna Polovneva (RUS)	2	1	1	3	7	0–4 TO	—	7–0
3	Diletta Giampiccolo (ITA)	2	0	2	0	0	0–4 TO	0–3 PO	—

Source: Japan Wrestling

==== Pool 3 ====
Pos	Athlete	Pld	W	L	CP	TP	POL	UKR	ESP
1	Małgorzata Bassa (POL)	2	2	0	6	9	—	6–2	3–0
2	Lyudmyla Holovchenko (UKR)	2	1	1	5	13	1–3 PP	—	11–0
3	Sebastiana Jiménez (ESP)	2	0	2	0	0	0–3 PO	0–4 ST	—

Source: Japan Wrestling

==== Pool 4 ====
Pos	Athlete	Pld	W	L	CP	TP	JPN	USA	KOR
1	Kaori Icho (JPN)	2	2	0	8	10	—	4–3 Fall	6–0 Fall
2	Sara McMann (USA)	2	1	1	4	14	0–4 TO	—	11–0
3	Yoon So-young (KOR)	2	0	2	0	0	0–4 TO	0–4 ST	—

Source: Japan Wrestling

==== Pool 5 ====
Pos	Athlete	Pld	W	L	CP	TP	CHN	BLR	BUL
1	Xu Haiyan (CHN)	2	2	0	8	22	—	12–2	10–0
2	Volha Khilko (BLR)	2	1	1	5	14	1–4 SP	—	12–0
3	Raya Raicheva (BUL)	2	0	2	0	0	0–4 ST	0–4 ST	—

Source: Japan Wrestling

==== Pool 6 ====
Pos	Athlete	Pld	W	L	CP	TP	AUT	IND	FRA	SEN
1	Nikola Hartmann (AUT)	3	3	0	11	14	—	4–3	7–0 Fall	3–0 Fall
2	Geetika Jakhar (IND)	3	2	1	9	16	1–3 PP	—	6–2 Fall	7–0 Fall
3	Nadia Moussaoui (FRA)	3	1	2	3	9	0–4 TO	0–4 TO	—	7–1
4	Jacqueline Biaye (SEN)	3	0	3	1	1	0–4 TO	0–4 TO	1–3 PP	—

Source: Japan Wrestling

==== Pool 7 ====
Pos	Athlete	Pld	W	L	CP	TP	SWE	CAN	MGL	VEN
1	Sara Eriksson (SWE)	3	3	0	10	18	—	3–1	6–4	9–0 Fall
2	Tara Hedican (CAN)	3	2	1	9	35	1–3 PP	—	14–3	20–3 Fall
3	Ochirbatyn Myagmarsüren (MGL)	3	1	2	6	14	1–3 PP	1–4 SP	—	7–0 Fall
4	Raine Guerra (VEN)	3	0	3	0	3	0–4 TO	0–4 TO	0–4 TO	—

Source: Japan Wrestling

=== Knockout round ===
Quarterfinals
Stéphanie Groß (GER)	0
Lene Aanes (NOR)	2
Małgorzata Bassa (POL)	1
Kaori Icho (JPN)	4
Xu Haiyan (CHN)	6^{F}
Nikola Hartmann (AUT)	5

Semifinals
Lene Aanes (NOR)	0
Kaori Icho (JPN)	3
Xu Haiyan (CHN)	1
Sara Eriksson (SWE)	5

Final
Kaori Icho (JPN)	4^{F}
Sara Eriksson (SWE)	0
Bronze medal match
Lene Aanes (NOR)	4^{F}
Xu Haiyan (CHN)	1
