= 2005 World Wrestling Championships – Women's freestyle 63 kg =

Women's freestyle 63 kg at the 2005 World Championships
- Venue: László Papp Budapest Sports Arena
- Dates: 29 September 2005
- Competitors: 24 from 24 nations

Medalists
gold medal	Kaori Icho	Japan
silver medal	Jing Ruixue	China
bronze medal	Sara McMann	United States
bronze medal	Volha Khilko	Belarus

The women's freestyle 63 kilograms is a competition featured at the 2005 World Wrestling Championships, and was held at the László Papp Budapest Sports Arena in Budapest, Hungary, on 29 September 2005.

This freestyle wrestling competition consists of a single-elimination tournament, with a repechage used to determine the winner of two bronze medals.

== Results ==
Legend

- F — Won by fall

=== Final ===
Final
Kaori Icho (JPN)	3	1
Jing Ruixue (CHN)	0	0

=== Top half ===
Round of 32

Round of 16
Ochirbatyn Nasanburmaa (MGL)	3	1
Stéphanie Groß (GER)	0	0
Anna Polovneva (RUS)	5	4
Mabel Fonseca (PUR)	0	0
Helena Allandi (SWE)	1	1
Geetika Jakhar (IND)	0	0
Sara McMann (USA)	2	1
Kaori Icho (JPN)	3	2

Quarterfinals
Ochirbatyn Nasanburmaa (MGL)	0	0
Anna Polovneva (RUS)	1	7
Helena Allandi (SWE)	0	0
Kaori Icho (JPN)	3	3

Semifinals
Anna Polovneva (RUS)	0	0
Kaori Icho (JPN)	3	3

=== Bottom half ===
Round of 32
Oļesja Zamula (LAT)	0
Mónika Szerencse (HUN)	4^{F}
Katarzyna Juszczak (ITA)	4	5
Su Ying-tzu (TPE)	3	0
Meryem Selloum (FRA)	0	2	3
Agoro Papavasileiou (GRE)	1	2	1
Aurora Fajardo (ESP)	1	0
Michala Křížková (CZE)	2	2
Jing Ruixue (CHN)	6	4
Lyudmyla Holovchenko (UKR)	0	2
Tara Hedican (CAN)	1	1	1
Nikola Hartmann (AUT)	1	1	0
Monika Rogien (POL)	0	1	2
Juliana Borges (BRA)	1	0	0
Volha Khilko (BLR)	4	1	1
Mihaela Sadoveanu (ROM)	0	1	0

Round of 16
Mónika Szerencse (HUN)	0	6	0
Katarzyna Juszczak (ITA)	2	2	1
Meryem Selloum (FRA)	1
Michala Křížková (CZE)	2^{F}
Jing Ruixue (CHN)	1	5
Tara Hedican (CAN)	0	0
Monika Rogien (POL)	0	0
Volha Khilko (BLR)	1	1

Quarterfinals
Katarzyna Juszczak (ITA)	1	0	1
Michala Křížková (CZE)	0	3	0
Jing Ruixue (CHN)	1	3	2
Volha Khilko (BLR)	3	1	1

Semifinals
Katarzyna Juszczak (ITA)	0	0
Jing Ruixue (CHN)	7	7

=== Repechage ===
Repechage round 1
Lyudmyla Holovchenko (UKR)	0	0
Tara Hedican (CAN)	1	2^{F}

Repechage round 2
Sara McMann (USA)	2	4	2
Helena Allandi (SWE)	5	2	2
Tara Hedican (CAN)	0	2
Volha Khilko (BLR)	1	3

Bronze medals
Sara McMann (USA)	1	2	4
Anna Polovneva (RUS)	2	1	2
Volha Khilko (BLR)	4	4
Katarzyna Juszczak (ITA)	0	0
