= 1999 World Wrestling Championships – Women's freestyle 62 kg =

Women's freestyle 62 kg at the 1999 World Championships
- Venue: Hildursborg
- Dates: 10–12 September 1999
- Competitors: 16 from 16 nations

Medalists
gold medal	Ayako Shoda	Japan
silver medal	Meng Lili	China
bronze medal	Lotta Andersson	Sweden

The women's freestyle 62 kilograms is a competition featured at the 1999 World Wrestling Championships, and was held at the Stadium Hildursborg in Boden, Sweden from 10 to 12 September 1999.

== Results ==
Legend

- F — Won by fall

=== Preliminary round ===
==== Pool 1 ====
Pos	Athlete	Pld	W	L	CP	TP	CAN	VEN	LAT
1	Jane Hofweber (CAN)	2	2	0	7	20	—	5–2	15–0
2	Unilce Hurtado (VEN)	2	1	1	5	14	1–3 PP	—	12–2
3	Kristīne Odriņa (LAT)	2	0	2	1	2	0–4 ST	1–4 SP	—

Source: Official website

==== Pool 2 ====
Pos	Athlete	Pld	W	L	CP	TP	USA	UKR	FRA
1	Lauren Lamb (USA)	2	2	0	7	14	—	5–1 Fall	9–5
2	Lyudmyla Holovchenko (UKR)	2	1	1	3	7	0–4 TO	—	6–0
3	Sandrine Sève (FRA)	2	0	2	1	5	1–3 PP	0–3 PO	—

Source: Official website

==== Pool 3 ====
Pos	Athlete	Pld	W	L	CP	TP	JPN	SWE	GER
1	Ayako Shoda (JPN)	2	2	0	7	10	—	6–1	4–0 Fall
2	Lotta Andersson (SWE)	2	1	1	5	11	1–3 PP	—	10–0
3	Christina Oertli (GER)	2	0	2	0	0	0–4 TO	0–4 ST	—

Source: Official website

==== Pool 4 ====
Pos	Athlete	Pld	W	L	CP	TP	AUT	ITA	POL
1	Nikola Hartmann (AUT)	2	2	0	6	10	—	3–2	7–4
2	Diletta Giampiccolo (ITA)	2	1	1	4	5	1–3 PP	—	3–2
3	Małgorzata Bassa (POL)	2	0	2	2	6	1–3 PP	1–3 PP	—

Source: Official website

==== Pool 5 ====
Pos	Athlete	Pld	W	L	CP	TP	CHN	NOR	RUS	BRA
1	Meng Lili (CHN)	3	3	0	11	19	—	13–1 Fall	6–3	WO
2	Lene Aanes (NOR)	3	2	1	7	17	0–4 TO	—	5–3	11–0
3	Natalia Ivanova (RUS)	3	1	2	6	24	1–3 PP	1–3 PP	—	18–0 Fall
4	Marisa Azzolini (BRA)	3	0	3	0	0	0–4 PA	0–4 ST	0–4 TO	—

Source: Official website

=== Knockout round ===
Quarterfinals
Jane Hofweber (CAN)	5
Lauren Lamb (USA)	3
Ayako Shoda (JPN)	4
Nikola Hartmann (AUT)	3
Meng Lili (CHN)	5^{F}
Unilce Hurtado (VEN)	0
Lotta Andersson (SWE)	6
Lene Aanes (NOR)	0

Semifinals
Jane Hofweber (CAN)	0
Ayako Shoda (JPN)	3^{F}
Meng Lili (CHN)	11^{F}
Lotta Andersson (SWE)	0

Final
Ayako Shoda (JPN)	5
Meng Lili (CHN)	2
Bronze medal match
Jane Hofweber (CAN)	6
Lotta Andersson (SWE)	7
