= 1998 World Wrestling Championships – Women's freestyle 62 kg =

Women's freestyle 62 kg at the 1998 World Championships
- Venue: Hala Arena
- Dates: 8–10 October 1998
- Competitors: 17 from 17 nations

Medalists
| gold medal | Nikola Hartmann | Austria |
| silver medal | Lene Aanes | Norway |
| bronze medal | Natalia Vinogradova | Russia |

The women's freestyle 62 kilograms is a competition featured at the 1998 World Wrestling Championships, and was held in Poznań, Poland from 8 to 10 October 1998.

== Results ==
=== Round 1 ===
| | Score | |
Round of 32
| Kristīne Odriņa (LAT) | 0–6 Fall | Olesya Kisileva (UZB) |
| Anna Udycz (POL) | 4–5 | Anita Schätzle (GER) |
| Li Xiaoming (CHN) | 0–2 Fall | Lyudmyla Holovchenko (UKR) |
| Lotta Andersson (SWE) | 0–6 | Natalia Vinogradova (RUS) |
| Ari Suzuki (JPN) | 7–0 Fall | Celia Derham (AUS) |
| Lauren Wolfe (USA) | 8–0 | Angela Lattanzio (ITA) |
| Lene Aanes (NOR) | 4–0 Fall | Trish Leibel (CAN) |
| Aurora Fajardo (ESP) | 1–7 Fall | Lise Golliot (FRA) |
| Nikola Hartmann (AUT) | | Bye |

=== Round 2 ===
| | Score | |
Round of 16
| Nikola Hartmann (AUT) | 10–0 | Olesya Kisileva (UZB) |
| Anita Schätzle (GER) | 4–6 | Lyudmyla Holovchenko (UKR) |
| Natalia Vinogradova (RUS) | 6–4 | Ari Suzuki (JPN) |
| Lauren Wolfe (USA) | 0–4 Fall | Lene Aanes (NOR) |
| Lise Golliot (FRA) | | Bye |
Repechage
| Kristīne Odriņa (LAT) | 0–7 Fall | Anna Udycz (POL) |
| Li Xiaoming (CHN) | 0–5 | Lotta Andersson (SWE) |
| Celia Derham (AUS) | 8–5 Fall | Angela Lattanzio (ITA) |
| Trish Leibel (CAN) | 11–0 | Aurora Fajardo (ESP) |

=== Round 3 ===
| | Score | |
Quarterfinals
| Lise Golliot (FRA) | 1–3 | Nikola Hartmann (AUT) |
| Lyudmyla Holovchenko (UKR) | | Bye |
| Natalia Vinogradova (RUS) | | Bye |
| Lene Aanes (NOR) | | Bye |
Repechage
| Anna Udycz (POL) | 0–3 | Lotta Andersson (SWE) |
| Celia Derham (AUS) | 0–7 | Trish Leibel (CAN) |
| Olesya Kisileva (UZB) | 0–10 Fall | Anita Schätzle (GER) |
| Ari Suzuki (JPN) | 7–4 | Lauren Wolfe (USA) |

=== Round 4 ===
| | Score | |
Semifinals
| Nikola Hartmann (AUT) | 4–0 | Lyudmyla Holovchenko (UKR) |
| Natalia Vinogradova (RUS) | 2–3 | Lene Aanes (NOR) |
Repechage
| Lotta Andersson (SWE) | 0–4 | Trish Leibel (CAN) |
| Anita Schätzle (GER) | 1–4 | Lise Golliot (FRA) |
| Ari Suzuki (JPN) | | Bye |

=== Round 5 ===
| | Score | |
Repechage
| Ari Suzuki (JPN) | 2–2 | Lise Golliot (FRA) |
| Trish Leibel (CAN) | | Bye |

=== Round 6 ===
| | Score | |
Repechage
| Lyudmyla Holovchenko (UKR) | 4–5 | Trish Leibel (CAN) |
| Lise Golliot (FRA) | 1–3 | Natalia Vinogradova (RUS) |

=== Finals ===
| | Score | |
Bronze medal match
| Trish Leibel (CAN) | 1–3 | Natalia Vinogradova (RUS) |
Final
| Nikola Hartmann (AUT) | 5–3 Fall | Lene Aanes (NOR) |
