= 2000 World Wrestling Championships – Women's freestyle 62 kg =

Women's freestyle 62 kg at the 2000 World Championships
- Venue: Universiada Hall
- Dates: 1–3 September 2000
- Competitors: 17 from 17 nations

Medalists
gold medal	Nikola Hartmann	Austria
silver medal	Rena Iwama	Japan
bronze medal	Stéphanie Groß	Germany

The women's freestyle 62 kilograms is a competition featured at the 2000 World Wrestling Championships, and was held at the Universiada Hall in Sofia, Bulgaria from 1 to 3 September 2000.

== Results ==
Legend

- F — Won by fall

=== Preliminary round ===
==== Pool 1 ====
Pos	Athlete	Pld	W	L	CP	TP	GER	BUL	TUR
1	Stéphanie Groß (GER)	2	2	0	8	20	—	10–0	10–0
2	Iliana Selnichka (BUL)	2	1	1	4	12	0–4 ST	—	12–1
3	Eda Toraman (TUR)	2	0	2	1	1	0–4 ST	1–4 SP	—

Source: Japan Wrestling

==== Pool 2 ====
Pos	Athlete	Pld	W	L	CP	TP	ITA	VEN	UKR
1	Diletta Giampiccolo (ITA)	2	2	0	7	10	—	3–0	7–0 Fall
2	Unilce Hurtado (VEN)	2	1	1	3	5	0–3 PO	—	5–1
3	Tatiana Volkova (UKR)	2	0	2	1	1	0–4 TO	1–3 PP	—

Source: Japan Wrestling

==== Pool 3 ====
Pos	Athlete	Pld	W	L	CP	TP	AUT	USA	GRE
1	Nikola Hartmann (AUT)	2	2	0	7	15	—	5–2	10–0
2	Sara McMann (USA)	2	1	1	5	5	1–3 PP	—	3–0 Fall
3	Sofia Kampanari (GRE)	2	0	2	0	0	0–4 ST	0–4 TO	—

Source: Japan Wrestling

==== Pool 4 ====
Pos	Athlete	Pld	W	L	CP	TP	JPN	SWE	ESP	CAN
1	Rena Iwama (JPN)	3	3	0	11	14	—	4–3	10–0	WO
2	Lotta Andersson (SWE)	3	2	1	9	16	1–3 PP	—	7–0 Fall	6–0 Fall
3	Sebastiana Jiménez (ESP)	3	1	2	4	0	0–4 ST	0–4 TO	—	WO
4	Trish Leibel (CAN)	3	0	3	0	0	0–4 PA	0–4 TO	0–4 PA	—

Source: Japan Wrestling

==== Pool 5 ====
Pos	Athlete	Pld	W	L	CP	TP	POL	RUS	NOR	TPE
1	Małgorzata Bassa (POL)	3	3	0	10	15	—	3–2	4–1	8–0 Fall
2	Natalia Ivanova (RUS)	3	2	1	7	14	1–3 PP	—	3–2	9–0
3	Lene Aanes (NOR)	3	1	2	5	9	1–3 PP	1–3 PP	—	6–0
4	Huang Yu-ning (TPE)	3	0	3	0	0	0–4 TO	0–3 PO	0–3 PO	—

Source: Japan Wrestling

=== Knockout round ===
Quarterfinals
Stéphanie Groß (GER)	4
Diletta Giampiccolo (ITA)	0

Semifinals
Stéphanie Groß (GER)	0
Nikola Hartmann (AUT)	4
Rena Iwama (JPN)	3
Małgorzata Bassa (POL)	1

Final
Nikola Hartmann (AUT)	5
Rena Iwama (JPN)	2
Bronze medal match
Stéphanie Groß (GER)	3^{F}
Małgorzata Bassa (POL)	0
