= 1997 World Wrestling Championships – Women's freestyle 68 kg =

Women's freestyle 68 kg at the 1997 World Championships
- Venue: Clermont-Ferrand Sports Hall
- Dates: 10–12 July 1997
- Competitors: 16 from 16 nations

Medalists
gold medal	Christine Nordhagen	Canada
silver medal	Sandra Bacher	United States
bronze medal	Nina Englich	Germany

The women's freestyle 68 kilograms is a competition featured at the 1997 World Wrestling Championships, and was at the Clermont-Ferrand Sports Hall held in Clermont-Ferrand, France from 10 to 12 July 1997.

== Results ==
=== Round 1 ===
	Score	
Round of 16
Lene Barlie (NOR)	4–3	Anna Udycz (POL)
Sandra Bacher (USA)	4–3	Doris Blind (FRA)
Nina Strasser (AUT)	4–2 Fall	Elmira Kurbanova (RUS)
Giulia Losito (ITA)	5–6	Zhang Qing (CHN)
Yayoi Urano (JPN)	3–1	Galina Ivanova (BUL)
Xiomara Guevara (VEN)	10–0	Wu Huei-li (TPE)
Christine Nordhagen (CAN)	5–2	Nina Englich (GER)
Svetlana Yashkina (UKR)	8–0	Kylie McKenzie (AUS)

=== Round 2 ===
	Score	
Quarterfinals
Lene Barlie (NOR)	0–4 Fall	Sandra Bacher (USA)
Nina Strasser (AUT)	3–5	Zhang Qing (CHN)
Yayoi Urano (JPN)	8–0 Fall	Xiomara Guevara (VEN)
Christine Nordhagen (CAN)	12–2	Svetlana Yashkina (UKR)
Repechage
Anna Udycz (POL)	0–2	Doris Blind (FRA)
Elmira Kurbanova (RUS)	0–3 Fall	Giulia Losito (ITA)
Galina Ivanova (BUL)	12–1 Fall	Wu Huei-li (TPE)
Nina Englich (GER)	10–0	Kylie McKenzie (AUS)

=== Round 3 ===
	Score	
Semifinals
Sandra Bacher (USA)	4–1 Fall	Zhang Qing (CHN)
Yayoi Urano (JPN)	3–4	Christine Nordhagen (CAN)
Repechage
Doris Blind (FRA)	4–0 Fall	Giulia Losito (ITA)
Galina Ivanova (BUL)	0–4	Nina Englich (GER)
Lene Barlie (NOR)	0–5 Fall	Nina Strasser (AUT)
Xiomara Guevara (VEN)	3–4	Svetlana Yashkina (UKR)

=== Round 4 ===
	Score	
Repechage
Doris Blind (FRA)	0–5	Nina Englich (GER)
Nina Strasser (AUT)	3–1	Svetlana Yashkina (UKR)

=== Round 5 ===
	Score	
Repechage
Zhang Qing (CHN)	0–7	Nina Englich (GER)
Nina Strasser (AUT)	1–4	Yayoi Urano (JPN)

=== Finals ===
	Score	
5th place match
Zhang Qing (CHN)	3–4 Fall	Nina Strasser (AUT)
Bronze medal match
Nina Englich (GER)	3–0	Yayoi Urano (JPN)
Final
Sandra Bacher (USA)	0–1 Ret	Christine Nordhagen (CAN)
