= 1999 World Wrestling Championships – Women's freestyle 68 kg =

Women's freestyle 68 kg at the 1999 World Championships
- Venue: Hildursborg
- Dates: 10–12 September 1999
- Competitors: 14 from 14 nations

Medalists
gold medal	Sandra Bacher	United States
silver medal	Anita Schätzle	Germany
bronze medal	Anna Shamova	Russia

The women's freestyle 68 kilograms is a competition featured at the 1999 World Wrestling Championships, and was held at the Stadium Hildursborg in Boden, Sweden from 10 to 12 September 1999.

== Results ==
=== Preliminary round ===
==== Pool 1 ====
Pos	Athlete	Pld	W	L	CP	TP	USA	SWE	JPN
1	Sandra Bacher (USA)	2	2	0	7	8	—	3–2	5–0 Fall
2	Heidi Skemark (SWE)	2	1	1	5	8	1–3 PP	—	6–0 Fall
3	Tomoe Miyamoto (JPN)	2	0	2	0	0	0–4 TO	0–4 TO	—

Source: Official website

==== Pool 2 ====
Pos	Athlete	Pld	W	L	CP	TP	UKR	NOR	ITA
1	Natalya Bodnarets (UKR)	2	2	0	8	16	—	5–0 Fall	11–0
2	Lene Barlie (NOR)	2	1	1	4	4	0–4 TO	—	4–0 Fall
3	Rita Girone (ITA)	2	0	2	0	0	0–4 ST	0–4 TO	—

Source: Official website

==== Pool 3 ====
Pos	Athlete	Pld	W	L	CP	TP	GER	VEN	BUL	AUT
1	Anita Schätzle (GER)	3	2	1	8	17	—	4–7	7–3	6–0 Fall
2	Xiomara Guevara (VEN)	3	2	1	6	12	3–1 PP	—	4–1	1–5 Fall
3	Galina Ivanova (BUL)	3	1	2	5	12	1–3 PP	1–3 PP	—	8–3
4	Nina Strasser (AUT)	3	1	2	5	8	0–4 TO	4–0 TO	1–3 PP	—

Source: Official website

==== Pool 4 ====
Pos	Athlete	Pld	W	L	CP	TP	RUS	POL	FRA	CAN
1	Anna Shamova (RUS)	3	3	0	11	16	—	3–1	5–2 Fall	8–3 Fall
2	Ewelina Pruszko (POL)	3	1	2	6	5	1–3 PP	—	1–3	3–0 Fall
3	Lise Golliot (FRA)	3	1	2	4	7	0–4 TO	3–1 PP	—	2–3
4	Shannon Samler (CAN)	3	1	2	3	6	0–4 TO	0–4 TO	3–1 PP	—

Source: Official website

=== Knockout round ===
Semifinals
Sandra Bacher (USA)	4
Natalya Bodnarets (UKR)	0
Anita Schätzle (GER)	8
Anna Shamova (RUS)	4

Final
Sandra Bacher (USA)	8
Anita Schätzle (GER)	1
Bronze medal match
Natalya Bodnarets (UKR)	0
Anna Shamova (RUS)	8
