= 1998 World Wrestling Championships – Women's freestyle 68 kg =

Women's freestyle 68 kg at the 1998 World Championships
- Venue: Hala Arena
- Dates: 8–10 October 1998
- Competitors: 16 from 16 nations

Medalists
gold medal	Christine Nordhagen	Canada
silver medal	Stéphanie Groß	Germany
bronze medal	Sandra Bacher	United States

The women's freestyle 68 kilograms is a competition featured at the 1998 World Wrestling Championships. It was held in Poznań, Poland, from 8 to 10 October 1998.

== Results ==
=== Round 1 ===
	Score	
Round of 16
Lene Barlie (NOR)	4–1	Sandra Bacher (USA)
Ewelina Pruszko (POL)	16–5	Margarita Montes (ESP)
Aldona Homiča (LAT)	0–11 Fall	Christine Nordhagen (CAN)
Anna Shamova (RUS)	10–0 Fall	Tatyana Denisova (UZB)
Nina Strasser (AUT)	11–1	Helene Karlsson (SWE)
Galina Ivanova (BUL)	5–4	Giulia Losito (ITA)
Natalya Bodnarets (UKR)	6–8	Reiko Sumiya (JPN)
Stéphanie Groß (GER)	7–0	Catherine Arlove (AUS)

=== Round 2 ===
	Score	
Quarterfinals
Lene Barlie (NOR)	3–4	Ewelina Pruszko (POL)
Christine Nordhagen (CAN)	10–0	Anna Shamova (RUS)
Nina Strasser (AUT)	6–5	Galina Ivanova (BUL)
Reiko Sumiya (JPN)	4–6	Stéphanie Groß (GER)
Repechage
Sandra Bacher (USA)	5–1 Fall	Margarita Montes (ESP)
Aldona Homiča (LAT)	9–0 Fall	Tatyana Denisova (UZB)
Helene Karlsson (SWE)	2–0	Giulia Losito (ITA)
Natalya Bodnarets (UKR)	0–7	Catherine Arlove (AUS)

=== Round 3 ===
	Score	
Semifinals
Ewelina Pruszko (POL)	1–11	Christine Nordhagen (CAN)
Nina Strasser (AUT)	0–6 Fall	Stéphanie Groß (GER)
Repechage
Sandra Bacher (USA)	6–0 Fall	Aldona Homiča (LAT)
Helene Karlsson (SWE)	1–3	Catherine Arlove (AUS)
Lene Barlie (NOR)	0–4	Anna Shamova (RUS)
Galina Ivanova (BUL)	4–0	Reiko Sumiya (JPN)

=== Round 4 ===
	Score	
Repechage
Sandra Bacher (USA)	7–0 Ret	Catherine Arlove (AUS)
Anna Shamova (RUS)	2–1 Fall	Galina Ivanova (BUL)

=== Round 5 ===
	Score	
Repechage
Ewelina Pruszko (POL)	3–4	Sandra Bacher (USA)
Anna Shamova (RUS)	8–5	Nina Strasser (AUT)

=== Finals ===
	Score	
Bronze medal match
Sandra Bacher (USA)	6–3	Anna Shamova (RUS)
Final
Christine Nordhagen (CAN)	13–0	Stéphanie Groß (GER)
