= 2003 World Wrestling Championships – Women's freestyle 67 kg =

Women's freestyle 67 kg at the 2003 World Championships
- Venue: Madison Square Garden
- Dates: 12–14 September 2003
- Competitors: 13 from 13 nations

Medalists
gold medal	Kristie Marano	United States
silver medal	Ewelina Pruszko	Poland
bronze medal	Svetlana Martinenko	Russia

The women's freestyle 67 kilograms is a competition featured at the 2003 World Wrestling Championships, and was held at the Madison Square Garden in New York, United States from 12 to 14 September 2003.

== Results ==
Legend

- F — Won by fall

=== Preliminary round ===
==== Pool 1 ====
Pos	Athlete	Pld	W	L	CP	TP	RUS	UKR	GER
1	Svetlana Martinenko (RUS)	2	2	0	6	6	—	3–1	3–0
2	Kateryna Burmistrova (UKR)	2	1	1	4	5	1–3 PP	—	4–1
3	Nina Englich (GER)	2	0	2	1	1	0–3 PO	1–3 PP	—

Source: Official website

==== Pool 2 ====
Pos	Athlete	Pld	W	L	CP	TP	POL	GRE	HUN
1	Ewelina Pruszko (POL)	2	2	0	7	14	—	3–1	11–0
2	Stavroula Zygouri (GRE)	2	1	1	5	6	1–3 PP	—	5–0 Fall
3	Mónika Szerencse (HUN)	2	0	2	0	0	0–4 ST	0–4 TO	—

Source: Official website

==== Pool 3 ====
Pos	Athlete	Pld	W	L	CP	TP	CAN	CHN	HUN
1	Shannon Samler (CAN)	2	2	0	7	18	—	6–4	12–1
2	Wang Jiao (CHN)	2	1	1	5	18	1–3 PP	—	14–0
3	Sha Ling-li (TPE)	2	0	2	1	1	1–4 SP	0–4 ST	—

Source: Official website

==== Pool 4 ====
Pos	Athlete	Pld	W	L	CP	TP	USA	JPN	CZE	NZL
1	Kristie Marano (USA)	3	3	0	12	26	—	7–1 Fall	10–0	9–0 Fall
2	Norie Saito (JPN)	3	2	1	8	18	0–4 TO	—	11–0	6–0 Fall
3	Martina Zyklová (CZE)	3	1	2	3	9	0–4 ST	0–4 ST	—	9–1
4	Jodeen MacGregor (NZL)	3	0	3	1	1	0–4 TO	0–4 TO	1–3 PP	—

Source: Official website

=== Knockout round ===
Semifinals
Svetlana Martinenko (RUS)	2
Ewelina Pruszko (POL)	2
Shannon Samler (CAN)	0
Kristie Marano (USA)	6^{F}

Final
Ewelina Pruszko (POL)	1
Kristie Marano (USA)	7
Bronze medal match
Svetlana Martinenko (RUS)	4
Shannon Samler (CAN)	3
