= 2000 World Wrestling Championships – Women's freestyle 68 kg =

Women's freestyle 68 kg at the 2000 World Championships
- Venue: Universiada Hall
- Dates: 1–3 September 2000
- Competitors: 13 from 13 nations

Medalists
| gold medal | Kristie Marano | United States |
| silver medal | Anna Shamova | Russia |
| bronze medal | Tomoe Miyamoto | Japan |

The women's freestyle 68 kilograms is a competition featured at the 2000 World Wrestling Championships, and was held at the Universiada Hall in Sofia, Bulgaria from 1 to 3 September 2000.

== Results ==
Legend

- F — Won by fall

=== Preliminary round ===
==== Pool 1 ====
| Pos | Athlete | Pld | W | L | CP | TP | VEN | BUL | SWE |
|---|---|---|---|---|---|---|---|---|---|
| 1 | Xiomara Guevara (VEN) | 2 | 2 | 0 | 6 | 9 | — | 6–1 | 3–0 |
| 2 | Galina Ivanova (BUL) | 2 | 1 | 1 | 4 | 9 | 1–3 PP | — | 8–0 |
| 3 | Heidi Skemark (SWE) | 2 | 0 | 2 | 0 | 0 | 0–3 PO | 0–3 PO | — |

Source: Japan Wrestling

==== Pool 2 ====
| Pos | Athlete | Pld | W | L | CP | TP | USA | POL | TUR |
|---|---|---|---|---|---|---|---|---|---|
| 1 | Kristie Marano (USA) | 2 | 2 | 0 | 8 | 16 | — | 7–0 Fall | 9–1 Fall |
| 2 | Ewelina Pruszko (POL) | 2 | 1 | 1 | 3 | 4 | 0–4 TO | — | 4–1 |
| 3 | Gamze Sakızlıgil (TUR) | 2 | 0 | 2 | 1 | 2 | 0–4 TO | 1–3 PP | — |

Source: Japan Wrestling

==== Pool 3 ====
| Pos | Athlete | Pld | W | L | CP | TP | RUS | CAN | GER |
|---|---|---|---|---|---|---|---|---|---|
| 1 | Anna Shamova (RUS) | 2 | 2 | 0 | 6 | 14 | — | 6–2 | 8–0 |
| 2 | Shannon Samler (CAN) | 2 | 1 | 1 | 5 | 18 | 1–3 PP | — | 16–4 |
| 3 | Anita Schätzle (GER) | 2 | 0 | 2 | 1 | 4 | 0–3 PO | 1–4 SP | — |

Source: Japan Wrestling

==== Pool 4 ====
| Pos | Athlete | Pld | W | L | CP | TP | JPN | FRA | TPE | UKR |
|---|---|---|---|---|---|---|---|---|---|---|
| 1 | Tomoe Miyamoto (JPN) | 3 | 3 | 0 | 9 | 16 | — | 3–1 | 4–0 | 9–3 |
| 2 | Lise Legrand (FRA) | 3 | 2 | 1 | 7 | 13 | 1–3 PP | — | 6–1 | 6–0 |
| 3 | Sha Ling-li (TPE) | 3 | 1 | 2 | 4 | 4 | 0–3 PO | 1–3 PP | — | 3–2 |
| 4 | Natalya Bodnarets (UKR) | 3 | 0 | 3 | 2 | 5 | 1–3 PP | 0–3 PO | 1–3 PP | — |

Source: Japan Wrestling

=== Knockout round ===
Semifinals
Xiomara Guevara (VEN) | 1
Kristie Marano (USA) | 4^{F}
Anna Shamova (RUS) | 3^{F}
Tomoe Miyamoto (JPN) | 0

Final
Kristie Marano (USA) | 6
Anna Shamova (RUS) | 5
Bronze medal match
Xiomara Guevara (VEN) | 1
Tomoe Miyamoto (JPN) | 3
