= Wrestling at the 2004 Summer Olympics – Women's freestyle 63 kg =

Women's freestyle 63 kg at the Games of the XXVIII Olympiad
- Venue: Ano Liosia Olympic Hall
- Date: 22–23 August 2004
- Competitors: 12 from 12 nations

Medalists
1st place, gold medalist(s)		Kaori Icho	Japan
2nd place, silver medalist(s)		Sara McMann	United States
3rd place, bronze medalist(s)		Lise Legrand	France

The women's freestyle 63 kilograms at the 2004 Summer Olympics as part of the wrestling program were held at the Ano Liosia Olympic Hall, August 22 to August 23.

The competition held with an elimination system of three or four wrestlers in each pool, with the winners qualify for the semifinals and final by way of direct elimination.

== Schedule ==
All times are Eastern European Summer Time (UTC+03:00)

Date	Time	Event
22 August 2004	09:30	Round 1
22 August 2004	09:30	Round 2
22 August 2004	17:30	Round 3
23 August 2004	09:30	Semifinals
23 August 2004	17:30	Finals

== Results ==
Legend

- F — Won by fall

=== Elimination pools ===
==== Pool 1 ====
Pos	Athlete	Pld	W	L	CP	TP	Qualification
1	Stavroula Zygouri (GRE)	2	2	0	6	9	Semifinals
2	Stéphanie Groß (GER)	2	1	1	4	4	Classification 5–8
3	Sara Eriksson (SWE)	2	0	2	1	3	

Source: Official website

	Score		CP
Stéphanie Groß (GER)	1–4	Stavroula Zygouri (GRE)	1–3 PP
Sara Eriksson (SWE)	0–3	Stéphanie Groß (GER)	0–3 PO
Stavroula Zygouri (GRE)	5–3	Sara Eriksson (SWE)	3–1 PP

==== Pool 2 ====
Pos	Athlete	Pld	W	L	CP	TP	Qualification
1	Sara McMann (USA)	2	1	1	5	7	Semifinals
2	Viola Yanik (CAN)	2	1	1	4	6	Classification 5–8
3	Meng Lili (CHN)	2	1	1	3	8	

Source: Official website

	Score		CP
Meng Lili (CHN)	0–5 Fall	Sara McMann (USA)	0–4 TO
Viola Yanik (CAN)	1–8	Meng Lili (CHN)	1–3 PP
Sara McMann (USA)	2–5	Viola Yanik (CAN)	1–3 PP

==== Pool 3 ====
Pos	Athlete	Pld	W	L	CP	TP	Qualification
1	Lise Legrand (FRA)	2	2	0	6	10	Semifinals
2	Volha Khilko (BLR)	2	1	1	4	5	Classification 5–8
3	Natalia Ivanova (TJK)	2	0	2	1	1	

Source: Official website

	Score		CP
Volha Khilko (BLR)	1–7	Lise Legrand (FRA)	1–3 PP
Natalia Ivanova (TJK)	1–4	Volha Khilko (BLR)	1–3 PP
Lise Legrand (FRA)	3–0	Natalia Ivanova (TJK)	3–0 PO

==== Pool 4 ====
Pos	Athlete	Pld	W	L	CP	TP	Qualification
1	Kaori Icho (JPN)	2	2	0	7	16	Semifinals
2	Alena Kartashova (RUS)	2	1	1	4	9	Classification 5–8
3	Lyudmyla Holovchenko (UKR)	2	0	2	0	0	

Source: Official website

	Score		CP
Lyudmyla Holovchenko (UKR)	0–10	Kaori Icho (JPN)	0–4 ST
Alena Kartashova (RUS)	7–0	Lyudmyla Holovchenko (UKR)	3–0 PO
Kaori Icho (JPN)	6–2	Alena Kartashova (RUS)	3–1 PP

=== Classification 5–8 ===
Qualification 5–6		Classification 5–6
Stéphanie Groß (GER)	1
Viola Yanik (CAN)	4	Viola Yanik (CAN)	5
Volha Khilko (BLR)	4	Volha Khilko (BLR)	2
Alena Kartashova (RUS)	1

=== Final round ===
Semifinals
Stavroula Zygouri (GRE)	0
Sara McMann (USA)	4^{F}
Lise Legrand (FRA)	0
Kaori Icho (JPN)	4

Gold medal match
Sara McMann (USA)	2
Kaori Icho (JPN)	3
Bronze medal match
Stavroula Zygouri (GRE)	0
Lise Legrand (FRA)	10^{F}

== Final standing ==
Rank	Athlete
1st place, gold medalist(s)	Kaori Icho (JPN)
2nd place, silver medalist(s)	Sara McMann (USA)
3rd place, bronze medalist(s)	Lise Legrand (FRA)
4	Stavroula Zygouri (GRE)
5	Viola Yanik (CAN)
6	Volha Khilko (BLR)
7	Stéphanie Groß (GER)
8	Alena Kartashova (RUS)
9	Meng Lili (CHN)
10	Sara Eriksson (SWE)
11	Natalia Ivanova (TJK)
12	Lyudmyla Holovchenko (UKR)
