= Wrestling at the 2002 Asian Games – Women's freestyle 63 kg =

Women's freestyle 63 kg at the 2002 Asian Games
- Venue: Yangsan Gymnasium
- Date: 3–4 October 2002
- Competitors: 7 from 7 nations

Medalists
gold medal	Xu Haiyan	China
silver medal	Kaori Icho	Japan
bronze medal	Ochirbatyn Myagmarsüren	Mongolia

The women's freestyle 63 kilograms wrestling competition at the 2002 Asian Games in Busan was held on 3 October and 4 October at the Yangsan Gymnasium.

The competition held with an elimination system of three or four wrestlers in each pool, with the winners qualify for the final.

== Schedule ==
All times are Korea Standard Time (UTC+09:00)

Date	Time	Event
Thursday, 3 October 2002	10:00	Round 1
Thursday, 3 October 2002	16:00	Round 2
Friday, 4 October 2002	10:00	Round 3
Friday, 4 October 2002	16:00	Finals

== Results ==
Legend

- F — Won by fall

=== Preliminary ===
==== Pool 1 ====
Pos	Athlete	Pld	W	L	CP	TP	Qualification
1	Xu Haiyan (CHN)	2	2	0	7	15	Final
2	Ochirbatyn Myagmarsüren (MGL)	2	1	1	3	6	3rd–4th place
3	Natalia Ivanova (TJK)	2	0	2	2	5	

Source: Report

	Score		CP
Natalia Ivanova (TJK)	1–6	Ochirbatyn Myagmarsüren (MGL)	1–3 PP
Xu Haiyan (CHN)	10–4	Natalia Ivanova (TJK)	3–1 PP
Ochirbatyn Myagmarsüren (MGL)	0–5 Fall	Xu Haiyan (CHN)	0–4 TO

==== Pool 2 ====
Pos	Athlete	Pld	W	L	CP	TP	Qualification
1	Kaori Icho (JPN)	3	3	0	12	20	Final
2	Chuang Shu-fang (TPE)	3	2	1	8	7	3rd–4th place
3	Hang Jin-young (KOR)	3	1	2	4	13	
4	Oksana Kokorina (TKM)	3	0	3	0	0	

Source: Report

	Score		CP
Kaori Icho (JPN)	7–0 Fall	Oksana Kokorina (TKM)	4–0 TO
Chuang Shu-fang (TPE)	2–0 Fall	Hang Jin-young (KOR)	4–0 TO
Kaori Icho (JPN)	8–0 Fall	Chuang Shu-fang (TPE)	4–0 TO
Oksana Kokorina (TKM)	0–13 Fall	Hang Jin-young (KOR)	0–4 TO
Kaori Icho (JPN)	5–0 Fall	Hang Jin-young (KOR)	4–0 TO
Oksana Kokorina (TKM)	0–5 Fall	Chuang Shu-fang (TPE)	0–4 TO

=== Final round ===
Final
Xu Haiyan (CHN)	6
Kaori Icho (JPN)	5

3rd–4th place
Ochirbatyn Myagmarsüren (MGL)	4^{F}
Chuang Shu-fang (TPE)	0

== Final standing ==
Rank	Athlete
1st place, gold medalist(s)	Xu Haiyan (CHN)
2nd place, silver medalist(s)	Kaori Icho (JPN)
3rd place, bronze medalist(s)	Ochirbatyn Myagmarsüren (MGL)
4	Chuang Shu-fang (TPE)
5	Hang Jin-young (KOR)
6	Natalia Ivanova (TJK)
7	Oksana Kokorina (TKM)
