= Elisabeth Garcia =

Norwegian sport wrestler

Personal information
- Nationality: Norwegian
- Born: 3 January 1975 (age 51)

Sport
- Country: Norway
- Sport: Wrestling
Medal record
Women’s freestyle wrestling
Representing Norway
World Championships
Bronze medal – third place	1991 Tokyo	47 kg

Elisabeth Garcia (born 3 January 1975) is a Norwegian sport wrestler.

She won a bronze medal at the 1991 World Wrestling Championships in Tokyo.

She represented the club Lørenskog BK.
