= Ine Barlie =

Norwegian sport wrestler

Personal information
- Nationality: Norwegian
- Born: 31 May 1965 (age 61)

Sport
- Country: Norway
- Sport: Wrestling
Medal record
Women's freestyle wrestling
Representing Norway
World Championships
Gold medal – first place	1987 Lørenskog	61 kg
Gold medal – first place	1992 Villeurbanne	61 kg
Silver medal – second place	1989 Martigny	61 kg
Silver medal – second place	1991 Tokyo	65 kg

Ine Barlie (born 31 May 1965) is a Norwegian former sport wrestler. Her achievements include two gold medals at the world championships, in 1987 and 1992.

== Biography ==
She won gold medals at the 1987 and 1992 World Wrestling Championships, and silver medals in the same event in 1989 and 1991. She has won the Norwegian national championships sixteen times.
