= Natalia Ivanova (wrestler) =

Russian-Tajikistani freestyle wrestler

Personal information
- Full name: Natalia Ivanova
- Nationality: Russia; Tajikistan
- Born: 11 May 1969 (age 57) Angarsk, Russian SFSR, Soviet Union
- Height: 1.63 m (5 ft 4 in)
- Weight: 63 kg (139 lb)

Sport
- Style: Freestyle
- Club: SCHVCM Pobeda (RUS)
- Coach: Valery Saiziev (RUS)
Medal record
Women's freestyle wrestling
Representing Russia
World Championships
Silver medal – second place	1995 Mpscow	61 kg
Silver medal – second place	1996 Sofia	61 kg
Bronze medal – third place	1994 Sofia	61 kg
European Championships
Silver medal – second place	2001 Budapest	62 kg
Bronze medal – third place	1996 Oslo	61 kg
Bronze medal – third place	2000 Budapest	62 kg

Natalia Ivanovna Ivanova (Russian: Наталья Иванова; born May 11, 1969, in Angarsk, Russian SFSR) is a retired amateur Russian-Tajikistani freestyle wrestler, who competed in the women's middleweight category. Considered one of Russia's top female wrestlers of her decade, Ivanova has yielded a remarkable tally of six career medals, including two silver at the World Championships (1995 and 1996), before she acquired a dual citizenship to compete for Tajikistan in 2002. Since then, she scored a sixth spot in the 63-kg division at the 2002 Asian Games in Busan, South Korea, and also finished eleventh at the 2004 Summer Olympics. Ivanova is also a member of the wrestling squad for Pobeda Sports and Military Games Club in Angarsk, under her personal coach Valery Saiziev.

While competing for the Russian team, Ivanova emerged herself into a sporting fame at the 1995 World Women Championships in Moscow, Russia, where she captured a silver medal in the 61-kg division, losing to Austria's Nikola Hartmann. By the following year, she campaigned for her runner-up defense in the same tournament in Sofia, Bulgaria, and then boasted for the bronze at the European Championships in Oslo, Norway. Before leaving for the Tajik squad in 2002, Ivanova held a remarkable record of six medals; three of which came from the World Championships, and the rest from the European Championships. When she entered the 2002 Asian Games in Busan, South Korea as a crowd favorite in the women's middleweight category (63 kg), Ivanova missed a chance to capture another medal to her career hardware, placing sixth in the process.

When women's wrestling made its debut at the 2004 Summer Olympics in Athens, Ivanova qualified for her naturalized Tajik squad in the inaugural 63 kg class. Earlier in the process, she placed third and guaranteed a spot on the Tajik wrestling team from the Olympic Qualification Tournament in Tunis, Tunisia. Ivanova lost two straight matches each to Belarus' Volha Khilko (1–4) and eventual Olympic bronze medalist Lise Legrand of France (0–3), leaving her on the bottom of the pool and placing eleventh in the final standings.
