= Line Johansen =

Norwegian sport wrestler

Personal information
- Nationality: Norwegian
- Born: 12 January 1970 (age 56)

Sport
- Country: Norway
- Sport: Wrestling
Medal record
Women's freestyle wrestling
Representing Norway
World Championships
Gold medal – first place	1993 Stavern	53 kg
Gold medal – first place	1994 Sofia	57 kg
Silver medal – second place	1987 Lørenskog	53 kg
Bronze medal – third place	1990 Luleå	65 kg
Bronze medal – third place	1991 Tokyo	61 kg
Bronze medal – third place	1992 Villeurbanne	57 kg

Line Johansen (born 12 January 1970) is a Norwegian sport wrestler and twice world champion.

== Career ==
Johansen won a silver medal at the 1987 World Wrestling Championships, and bronze medals in 1990, 1991 and 1992. She won a gold medal at the 1993 World Wrestling Championships, and again a gold medal in 1994.

She won a total of seven national championships.
