= 1992 World Wrestling Championships =

- Host city: Villeurbanne, France
- Dates: 4–5 September 1992

Champions
- Women: Japan

The 1992 Women's World Wrestling Championships were held in Villeurbanne, France.

== Medal table ==
Rank	Nation	Gold	Silver	Bronze	Total
1	China	4	0	1	5
2	Venezuela	2	0	0	2
3	Japan	1	6	1	8
4	Norway	1	0	2	3
5	United States	1	0	0	1
6	Russia	0	1	3	4
7	Chinese Taipei	0	1	1	2
7	France	0	1	1	2
Totals (8 entries)		9	9	9	27

== Team ranking ==
Rank	Women's freestyle	
Rank	Team	Points
1	Japan	78
2	Russia	62
3	France	53
4	China	48
5	Venezuela	45
6	Chinese Taipei	42

== Medal summary ==
Event	Gold	Silver	Bronze
44 kg	Pan Yanping; China	Shoko Yoshimura; Japan	Tatiana Karamchakova; Russia
47 kg	Zhong Xiue; China	Tetey Alibekova; Russia	Miho Kamibayashi; Japan
50 kg	Tricia Saunders; United States	Yoshiko Endo; Japan	Martine Poupon; France
53 kg	Wendy Izaguirre; Venezuela	Akemi Kawasaki; Japan	Liudmila Popova; Russia
57 kg	Ryoko Sakamoto; Japan	Marine Roy; France	Line Johansen; Norway
61 kg	Ine Barlie; Norway	Kimie Hoshikawa; Japan	Kong Yan; China
65 kg	Wang Chaoli; China	Wu Huei-li; Chinese Taipei	Elmira Kurbanova; Russia
70 kg	Xiomara Guevara; Venezuela	Yayoi Urano; Japan	Chen Chin-ping; Chinese Taipei
75 kg	Liu Dongfeng; China	Mitsuko Funakoshi; Japan	Linda Johnsen-Holmeide; Norway

== Participating nations ==
96 competitors from 22 nations participated.

- Australia (4)
- Austria (1)
- Belgium (2)
- China (5)
- Chinese Taipei (8)
- Czechoslovakia (3)
- France (9)
- Germany (2)
- Greece (2)
- Italy (2)
- Japan (9)
- Latvia (3)
- Luxembourg (1)
- Netherlands (1)
- Norway (5)
- Portugal (3)
- Russia (9)
- Sweden (4)
- Switzerland (3)
- Ukraine (7)
- United States (5)
- Venezuela (8)

== See also ==
- Wrestling at the 1992 Summer Olympics
