= 1991 World Wrestling Championships =

Men
- Host city: Varna, Bulgaria
- Dates: 27 September – 6 October 1991

Women
- Host city: Tokyo, Japan
- Dates: 24–25 August 1991

Champions
- Freestyle: Soviet Union
- Greco-Roman: Soviet Union
- Women: Japan

The following is the final results of the 1991 World Wrestling Championships. Men's competition were held in Varna, Bulgaria and Women's competition were held in Tokyo, Japan.

== Medal table ==
Rank	Nation	Gold	Silver	Bronze	Total
1	Soviet Union	9	2	6	17
2	United States	3	7	0	10
3	Japan	3	2	2	7
4	China	3	1	0	4
5	Germany	3	0	1	4
6	France	2	1	3	6
7	Cuba	2	1	2	5
8	Iran	1	1	1	3
8	South Korea	1	1	1	3
10	Venezuela	1	0	2	3
11	Hungary	1	0	1	2
12	Bulgaria	0	2	3	5
12	Norway	0	2	3	5
14	Czechoslovakia	0	2	0	2
14	Sweden	0	2	0	2
16	Canada	0	1	1	2
16	Turkey	0	1	1	2
18	Greece	0	1	0	1
18	Italy	0	1	0	1
18	North Korea	0	1	0	1
21	Finland	0	0	1	1
21	Yugoslavia	0	0	1	1
Totals (22 entries)		29	29	29	87

== Team ranking ==
Rank	Men's freestyle		Men's Greco-Roman		Women's freestyle	
Rank	Team	Points	Team	Points	Team	Points
1	Soviet Union	90	Soviet Union	77	Japan	74
2	United States	67	Bulgaria	60	Venezuela	56
3	Iran	48	Cuba	37	Chinese Taipei	49
4	Germany	39	South Korea	37	France	45
5	South Korea	36	Yugoslavia	35	United States	44
6	Bulgaria	35	Hungary	33	China	39
7	Hungary	27	United States	33	Soviet Union	35
8	Turkey	26	Germany	32	Norway	34
9	North Korea	22	France	25	Sweden	21
10	Canada	20	Romania	23	South Korea	20

== Medal summary ==
=== Men's freestyle ===
Event	Gold	Silver	Bronze
48 kg	Vugar Orujov; Soviet Union	Kim Il; North Korea	Kim Jong-shin; South Korea
52 kg	Zeke Jones; United States	Valentin Yordanov; Bulgaria	Vladimir Toguzov; Soviet Union
57 kg	Sergey Smal; Soviet Union	Brad Penrith; United States	Oveis Mallah; Iran
62 kg	John Smith; United States	Giovanni Schillaci; Italy	Gadzhi Rashidov; Soviet Union
68 kg	Arsen Fadzaev; Soviet Union	Chris Wilson; Canada	Valentin Getsov; Bulgaria
74 kg	Amir Reza Khadem; Iran	Kenny Monday; United States	Nasir Gadzhikhanov; Soviet Union
82 kg	Kevin Jackson; United States	Jozef Lohyňa; Czechoslovakia	Sebahattin Öztürk; Turkey
90 kg	Makharbek Khadartsev; Soviet Union	Iraklis Deskoulidis; Greece	Roberto Limonta; Cuba
100 kg	Leri Khabelov; Soviet Union	Mark Coleman; United States	Heiko Balz; Germany
130 kg	Andreas Schröder; Germany	Gennady Zhiltsov; Soviet Union	Jeff Thue; Canada

=== Men's Greco-Roman ===
Event	Gold	Silver	Bronze
48 kg	Goun Duk-yong; South Korea	Reza Simkhah; Iran	Sergey Suvorov; Soviet Union
52 kg	Raúl Martínez; Cuba	Shawn Sheldon; United States	Jon Rønningen; Norway
57 kg	Rıfat Yıldız; Germany	Aleksandr Ignatenko; Soviet Union	András Sike; Hungary
62 kg	Sergey Martynov; Soviet Union	Mehmet Akif Pirim; Turkey	Juan Marén; Cuba
68 kg	Islam Dugushiev; Soviet Union	Marthin Kornbakk; Sweden	Stoyan Stoyanov; Bulgaria
74 kg	Mnatsakan Iskandaryan; Soviet Union	Jaroslav Zeman; Czechoslovakia	Yvon Riemer; France
82 kg	Péter Farkas; Hungary	Todor Angelov; Bulgaria	Goran Kasum; Yugoslavia
90 kg	Maik Bullmann; Germany	Reynaldo Peña; Cuba	Harri Koskela; Finland
100 kg	Héctor Milián; Cuba	Jörgen Olsson; Sweden	Sergey Demyashkevich; Soviet Union
130 kg	Aleksandr Karelin; Soviet Union	Matt Ghaffari; United States	Rangel Gerovski; Bulgaria

=== Women's freestyle ===
Event	Gold	Silver	Bronze
44 kg	Zhong Xiue; China	Marie Ziegler; United States	Shoko Yoshimura; Japan
47 kg	Miyu Yamamoto; Japan	Pan Yanping; China	Elisabeth Garcia; Norway
50 kg	Martine Poupon; France	Shannon Williams; United States	Yoko Higashi; Japan
53 kg	Zhang Xia; China	Yoshiko Endo; Japan	Wendy Izaguirre; Venezuela
57 kg	Olga Lugo; Venezuela	Gudrun Høie; Norway	Marine Roy; France
61 kg	Brigitte Siffert; France	Kimie Hoshikawa; Japan	Line Johansen; Norway
65 kg	Akiko Iijima; Japan	Ine Barlie; Norway	Sylvie Thomé; France
70 kg	Yayoi Urano; Japan	Emmanuelle Blind; France	Mirna Martínez; Venezuela
75 kg	Liu Dongfeng; China	Jeun Kyung-ran; South Korea	Liudmila Golikova; Soviet Union

== Participating nations ==
=== Men ===
494 competitors from 49 nations participated.

- Algeria (1)
- Australia (3)
- Austria (11)
- Belgium (2)
- Brazil (2)
- Bulgaria (20)
- Canada (12)
- China (16)
- Chinese Taipei (17)
- Colombia (1)
- Cuba (10)
- Cyprus (2)
- Czechoslovakia (16)
- Denmark (4)
- Finland (10)
- France (12)
- Germany (20)
- Great Britain (5)
- Greece (19)
- Guam (1)
- Hungary (19)
- India (7)
- Iran (16)
- Israel (8)
- Italy (11)
- Japan (20)
- Jordan (4)
- Latvia (4)
- Mexico (4)
- Mongolia (10)
- Namibia (2)
- Netherlands (7)
- New Zealand (6)
- Nigeria (8)
- North Korea (8)
- Norway (5)
- Philippines (3)
- Poland (20)
- Portugal (6)
- Puerto Rico (1)
- Romania (16)
- South Korea (20)
- Soviet Union (20)
- Spain (9)
- Sweden (9)
- Switzerland (10)
- Turkey (20)
- United States (20)
- Yugoslavia (17)

=== Women ===
64 competitors from 13 nations participated.

- Australia (2)
- China (4)
- Chinese Taipei (9)
- France (5)
- Greece (1)
- Japan (9)
- Netherlands (1)
- Norway (4)
- South Korea (4)
- Soviet Union (5)
- Sweden (5)
- United States (7)
- Venezuela (8)
