= Stavroula Zygouri =

Greek freestyle wrestler

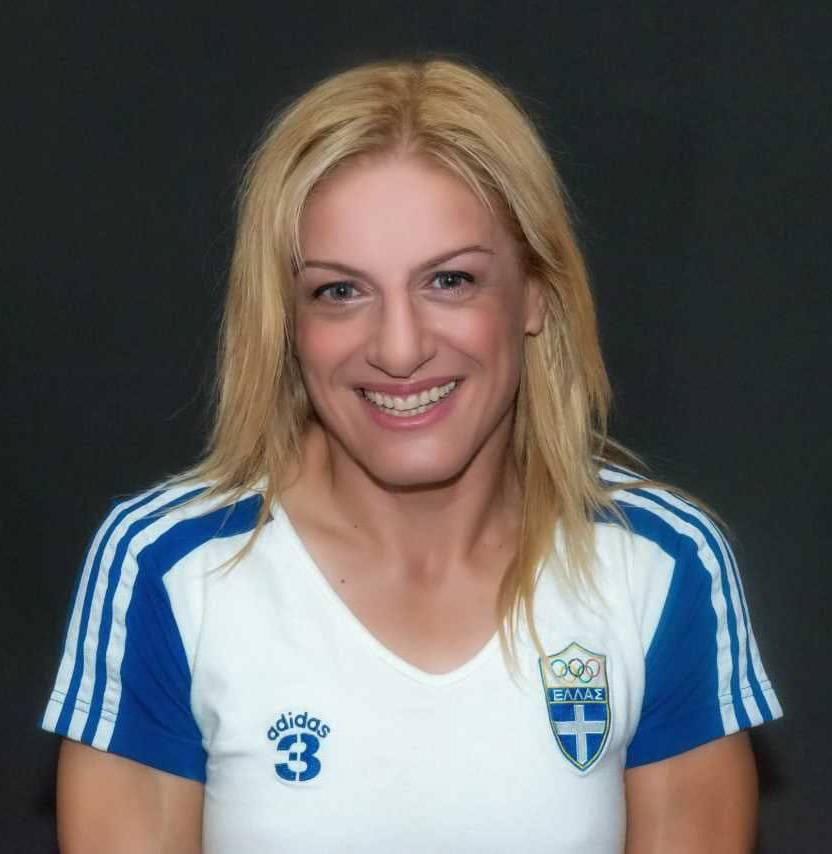

Personal information
- Full name: Stavroula Zygouri
- Nationality: Greece
- Born: 4 May 1968 (age 58) Athens, Greece
- Height: 1.71 m (5 ft 7 1/2 in)
- Weight: 63 kg (139 lb)

Sport
- Style: Freestyle
- Club: Atlas Kallitheas
- Coach: Panagiotis Kalaigidis
Medal record
Women's freestyle wrestling
Representing Greece
Mediterranean Games
Silver medal – second place	2001 Tunis	63 kg

Stavroula Zygouri (Greek: Σταυρούλα Ζυγούρη; born May 4, 1968, in Athens) is a retired amateur Greek freestyle wrestler, who competed in the women's middleweight category. She picked up a silver medal in the 63-kg division at the 2001 Mediterranean Games in Tunis, Tunisia, and later finished fourth in Athens, when Greece hosted the 2004 Summer Olympics. Before her sporting career ended in 2012, Zygouri trained as a member of the wrestling team for Atlas Kallitheas in her native Athens, under her personal coach and mentor Panagiotis Kalaigidis.

Zygouri emerged herself into a sporting fame at the 2001 Mediterranean Games in Tunis, Tunisia, where she captured a silver medal in the 63-kg division, losing her final match to Italy's Diletta Giampiccolo. She also had an opportunity to compete for the Greek squad in the same category at the 2003 World Wrestling Championships in New York City, New York, United States, but left empty-handed with a sixth-place effort.

When women's wrestling made its debut at the 2004 Summer Olympics in Athens, Zygouri qualified for the Greek squad, as a 36-year-old, in the inaugural 63 kg class. Apart from placing sixth at the World Championships, she also managed to fill up an entry by the International Federation of Association Wrestling and the Hellenic Olympic Committee, as Greece received an automatic berth for being the host nation. Amassed the home crowd inside Ano Liossia Olympic Hall, Zygouri started the prelim pool in a more sedate fashion with a pair of effortless victories over Germany's Stéphanie Groß 4–1 and Sweden's Sara Eriksson 5–3 to grant her a spot in the medal rounds. Zygouri was immediately pinned by U.S. wrestler Sara McMann in her semifinal match within 50 seconds, and then fell behind France's Lise Legrand with a similar disposition at two minutes and four seconds for the bronze medal, dropping her to fourth place.

Currently, Zygouri works as a secretary for the association of the Greek athletes under the Hellenic Olympic Committee, and also, a member of the Department of International Women's Sports Wrestling Federation for FILA.
