= Yayoi Urano =

Japanese freestyle wrestler

Yayoi Urano 浦野 弥生
Personal information
- Nationality: Japanese
- Born: 30 March 1969 (age 57) Kawasaki, Kanagawa Prefecture
- Height: 169 cm (5 ft 7 in)

Sport
- Country: Japan
- Sport: Wrestling
- Event: Freestyle
Medal record
Women's freestyle wrestling
Representing Japan
World Championships
| Gold medal – first place | 1990 Ostia | 75 kg |
| Gold medal – first place | 1991 Tokyo | 70 kg |
| Gold medal – first place | 1993 Stavern | 70 kg |
| Gold medal – first place | 1994 Sofia | 65 kg |
| Gold medal – first place | 1995 Moscow | 65 kg |
| Gold medal – first place | 1996 Sofia | 65 kg |
| Silver medal – second place | 1992 Villeurbanne | 70 kg |
Asian Championships
| Gold medal – first place | 1996 Xiaoshan | 65 kg |

Yayoi Urano (浦野 弥生, Urano Yayoi; born 30 March 1969) is a retired Japanese Wrestler and Judoka. She won six gold medals and one silver medal in three weight classes (65, 70, and 75 kg) at the World Wrestling Championships from 1990 to 1996.

== Biography ==
Urano was involved in track and field at Nakanobu Gakuen High School (中延学園高校) , as her father was a shot putter. After entering Nippon Sport Science University, she started Judo. She became captain of the Judo club and won the 61 kg weight class at the Tokyo University Championships. Furthermore, she also started Wrestling at the suggestion of Miyuu Yamamoto's father, Ikuei Yamamoto, who was a coach of the university wrestling team. In 1990, two years after starting wrestling, she won her first World Championships in the 75kg weight class. In 1991, she won the 70 kg weight class at the World Championships in Tokyo. She was second at the 1992 World Wrestling Championships, but won for the third time at the 1993 World Wrestling Championships. She then moved down to the 65kg weight class and won the World Championships for three consecutive years starting in 1994. She was with the sushi company Kyōtaru (京樽), but when the company went bankrupt, she went to Canada to study at the University of Alberta. There she married Japanese-Canadian wrestler Odagaki. Then she retired, partly due to a knee injury. In 2007, she became the second woman to be inducted into the UWW (then FILA) Hall of Fame. in 2013, Urano became a member of the UWW (then FILA) Women and Sport Commission.
