= Tara Hedican =

Canadian wrestler

Tara Hedican was a member of the Canadian National Wrestling Team from 1998 to 2008. In 2001, she became the first Canadian woman to win a World Junior Wrestling Championship. Hedican was the recipient of the Tom Longboat Award in 2001. Hedican also won a Pan American championship (this is different from the Pan American games) in 2003. She was a dual-sport athlete at the University of Guelph where she competed in wrestling (2001–2004) and was inducted into the Guelph Gryphons Hall of Fame in 2016. Hedican completed her Bachelor of Arts with a concentration in History at the University of Guelph in 2016 and moved on to pursue a career in both teaching and coaching.

== Athletic career ==
As a member of the University of Guelph Gryphons Wrestling Team, Hedican won four Ontario University Athletics (OUA) (2001, 2002, 2003, 2004) and three Canadian Interuniversity Sport (CIS) (2002, 2003, 2004) gold medals in the 65 kg weight class. She was the OUA Athlete of the Year in 2003, a three-time CIS first team All-Canadian, and the CIS Outstanding Female Wrestler of the Year and University of Guelph Female Athlete of the Year in 2002 and 2003. She was also a two-time OUA Russell Division all-star in 2001 and 2002 as a rugby player. Hedican became the first Canadian woman to win a World Junior Wrestling Championship when she won the 63 kg class in 2001. Her career highlight was the Pan American Championships gold medal in 2003. Her highest placing at a non-junior world championship was 8th place in 2005 in the women's 63 kg. division.

== Education ==
Within her second year of university was not only an athlete but a coach and referee, while being a member of the Eabametoong First Nations in Ontario. Hedican completed her Bachelor of Arts in History at the University of Guelph in 2006. She then attended D'Youville University and received her Master of Science with a concentration in Secondary Education and Teaching in 2009. Hedican completed her Professional Master of Arts in Public Administration in 2012 at Queen's University. She is currently pursuing her Advanced Coaching Diploma through the Canadian Sport Institute of Ontario.

== Professional career ==
Hedican is passionate about First Nation education. In 2014, she began teaching courses at Confederation College. As of 2016 Tara Hedican was taking the 2 year Advanced Coaching Development (ACD) program to further develop and enhance her coaching skills. Her past and current courses taught include: Traditional Knowledge and Ethics, Contemporary Aboriginal Society, Sociology of Community: The Aboriginal Context, and People and the Forest. Hedican is also a health and physical education teacher at Mizhakiiwetung Memorial School where she serves as the Athletic Director. Hedican has been an elementary school teacher for the Upper Grand District School Board since 2006[1] and she was the Principal of Ojibway Heritage School during the 2002-2003 school year.

== Volunteer experience ==
Hedican has numerous volunteer experience within the sporting context. She was named the Assistant Coach of the Ontario Women's Wrestling team in October 2016. Starting in August 2016, Hedican became the Team Ontario Wrestling Manager of the 2017 North American Indigenous Games. Additionally, since 2013, Hedican has been the Manager of the Aboriginal Sport and Wellness Council of Ontario.

== Awards ==
Year	Award
2001	OUA Gold
2001	OUA Women's Team Silver
2001	CIS Silver
2001	OUA Russell Division All-Star
2001	Wrestling World Junior Champion
2002	OUA Gold
2002	OUA Outstanding Female Wrestler
2002	OUA Women's Team Silver
2002	CIS Gold
2002	Outstanding Female Wrestler
2002	CIS Gold
2002	OUA Russell Division All-Star
2002	Wrestling World Championships (9th)
2002	Tom Longboat Award Recipient
2003	OUA Gold
2003	OUA Outstanding Female Wrestler
2003	OUA Women's Team Silver
2003	CIS Gold
2003	Pan American Championships (1st)
2004	OUA Gold
2004	CIS Gold
2004	YMCA Women of Distinction Award (YMCA-YWCA of Guelph)
2005	Wrestling World Championships (8th)
2012	Elementary Teachers Federation of Ontario Aboriginal Women in Education Award
