= Volha Khilko =

Belarusian freestyle wrestler

Personal information
- Full name: Volha Viktarauna Khilko
- Nationality: Belarus
- Born: 24 March 1979 (age 47) Babruysk, Byelorussian SSR, Soviet Union
- Height: 1.61 m (5 ft 3 1/2 in)
- Weight: 63 kg (139 lb)

Sport
- Sport: Wrestling
- Event: Freestyle
- Club: RT FV Babruysk
- Coached by: Artur Zaitsau
Medal record
Women's freestyle wrestling
Representing Belarus
World Championships
Bronze medal – third place	2005 Budapest	63 kg
European Championships
Silver medal – second place	2005 Varna	63 kg

Volha Viktarauna Khilko (Belarusian: Вольга Віктараўна Хілько; Łacinka: Volha Viktaraŭna Chilko; born March 24, 1979, in Babruysk) is an amateur Belarusian wrestler, who competed in the women's middleweight category. She is the 2005 World bronze medalist and European silver medalist.

== Career ==
Khilko won the bronze medal at the 2005 World Wrestling Championships in Budapest, Hungary, in addition to her silver at the European Championships in Varna, Bulgaria.

Khilko made her official debut at the 2004 Summer Olympics, where she placed second in the preliminary pool of the women's 63 kg class, against France's Lise Legrand and Tajikistan's Natalia Ivanova. Khilko, however, lost to Canada's Viola Yanik in the fifth place match, with a technical score of 2–5.

At the 2008 Summer Olympics in Beijing, Khilko lost the second preliminary match of the 63 kg class to Poland's Monika Michalik by a technical fall, finishing in 13th place.
