= Lene Barlie =

Norwegian sport wrestler

Personal information
- Born: 16 February 1973 (age 53) Drøbak, Norway

Sport
- Sport: Wrestling
- Club: SK av 1909
Medal record
Women’s freestyle wrestling
Representing Norway
World Championships
Bronze medal – third place	1993 Stavern	61 kg

Lene Barlie (born 16 February 1973) is a Norwegian sport wrestler who represented the club SK av 1909.

== Biography ==
Barlie was born in Drøbak on 16 February 1973.

She won a bronze medal at the 1993 World Wrestling Championships. She was awarded the King's Cup at the 1993 Norwegian championships.
