= Meng Lili =

Chinese freestyle wrestler

Personal information
- Born: December 28, 1979 (age 46) Xintai, Tai'an, Shandong

Sport
- Country: China
- Sport: Freestyle wrestling

Meng Lili (simplified Chinese: 孟丽丽; traditional Chinese: 孟麗麗; pinyin: Mèng Lìlì; born December 28, 1979, in Xintai, Tai'an, Shandong) is a female Chinese freestyle wrestler who competed at the 2004 Summer Olympics. She finished ninth in the 63 kg freestyle competition.
