= Sandra Bacher =

American judoka and wrestler (born 1968)

Personal information
- Born: May 28, 1968 (age 58) Long Island, New York, U.S.

Sport
- Country: United States
- Sport: Wrestling and Judo
- Event: Freestyle wrestling
Medal record
Women's freestyle wrestling
Representing the United States
World Championships
Gold medal – first place	1999 Boden	68 kg
Silver medal – second place	1997 Clermond-Ferrand	68 kg
Bronze medal – third place	1998 Poznan	68 kg

Sandra "Sandy" Bacher (born May 28, 1968) is a former freestyle wrestler and Olympic level judo competitor. She was a 14 time US National Champion in Judo from 1992-2004. She was overall a 16 time medalist in the US National Championships.

In judo, Bacher would compete in the 1992, 1996 and 2000 Olympic Games but did not win a medal. She won a bronze medal in judo at the 1999 Pan American games.

As a freestyle wrestler competing at the World Wrestling Championships, Bacher would win silver in 1997, bronze in 1998, and gold in 1999.

== Early life ==
She attended the University of Washington before transferring to San Jose State.
