= Viola Yanik =

Canadian freestyle wrestler

Personal information
- Full name: Viola Akin Yanik
- Born: July 9, 1982 (age 44) Bonn, West Germany
Medal record
Women's freestyle wrestling
Representing Canada
Pan American Games
Silver medal – second place	2003 Santo Domingo	63 kg

Viola Yanik (born July 9, 1982 in Bonn, West Germany) is a Canadian wrestler. She has wrestled since 1997 and is a graduate of the University of Saskatchewan. She won a bronze medal in the 63 kg freestyle event at the 2003 World Championships in New York City, New York and wrestled in the first ever Women's Wrestling at the 2004 Athens Olympic Games, placing fifth. She retired from wrestling at the end of 2005 to pursue other endeavors.

== Personal life ==
Yanik is of Turkish origin. She is married to Tolga Yanik.
