= Stéphanie Groß =

German freestyle wrestler

Personal information
- Full name: Stéphanie Mary Groß
- Nationality: Germany
- Born: 12 October 1974 (age 51) Basel, Switzerland
- Height: 1.65 m (5 ft 5 in)
- Weight: 63 kg (139 lb)

Sport
- Style: Freestyle
- Club: AC Ückerath
- Coach: Walter Groß; Jürgen Scheibe
Medal record
Women's freestyle wrestling
Representing Germany
World Championships
Silver medal – second place	1997 Clermont-Ferrand	62 kg
Silver medal – second place	1998 Poznań	62 kg
Silver medal – second place	2007 Baku	59 kg
Bronze medal – third place	1996 Sofia	61 kg
Bronze medal – third place	2000 Sofia	62 kg
European Championships
Silver medal – second place	1998 Bratislava	62 kg
Silver medal – second place	2004 Haparanda	63 kg

Stéphanie Mary Groß (born 12 October 1974 in Basel, Switzerland) is a retired amateur German freestyle wrestler, who competed in the women's middleweight category. Gross has claimed four medals (three silver and one bronze) at the World Championships (1997, 1998, 2000, and 2007), and seized an opportunity to compete for Germany at the 2004 Summer Olympics. Before her sporting career ended in 2008, Gross trained full-time as a member of the wrestling squad for AC Ückerath in Dormagen, North Rhine-Westphalia, under her father and personal coach Walter Groß.

Gross began her career as a judoka, before she sought sights to wrestling at the age of fifteen. In 1997, Gross emerged herself into a sporting fame at the World Championships in Clermont-Ferrand, France, where she claimed a silver medal in the 62-kg division. Before her major Olympic debut, she held a stunning combined record of five medals; three of which came from the World Championships, and the other two from the European Championships.

When women's wrestling made its debut at the 2004 Summer Olympics in Athens, Gross qualified for the German squad, as a 29-year-old veteran in the 63 kg class. Earlier in the process, she earned an Olympic spot by taking second at the final Olympic Qualification Tournament in Madrid, Spain after missing out a coveted place from the World Championships. She lost her opening match 1–4 to the host nation's Stavroula Zygouri by the massive clamor of the home crowd inside Ano Liossa Olympic Hall, but rallied for a three-point victory by beating Sweden's Sara Eriksson in her second bout to close the prelim pool. Despite missing a spot for the semifinals, Gross seized an opportunity to face against Canadian wrestler and 2003 world bronze medalist Viola Yanik in the consolation round, but she could not score enough points to push her opponent off the mat, and lost the match 1–4, placing only seventh in the final standings.

At the 2007 World Wrestling Championships in Baku, Azerbaijan, Gross fell short of a chance to take her first ever trophy after losing out to Frenchwoman Audrey Prieto with a 2–10 decision, but guaranteed to cease her nine-year medal drought with a silver.
