= Lyudmyla Holovchenko =

Ukrainian freestyle wrestler

Personal information
- Full name: Lyudmyla Holovchenko
- Nationality: Ukraine
- Born: 31 August 1978 (age 47) Khmelnytskyi, Ukrainian SSR, Soviet Union
- Height: 1.65 m (5 ft 5 in)
- Weight: 63 kg (139 lb)

Sport
- Style: Freestyle
- Club: CSK Belaya Zerkov
- Coach: Serhiy Basitsi

Lyudmyla Holovchenko (Ukrainian: Людмила Головченко; born 31 August 1978 in Khmelnytskyi, Ukrainian SSR) is a retired amateur Ukrainian freestyle wrestler, who competed in the women's middleweight category. She boasted a fourth-place finish in the 63-kg division at the 2003 World Wrestling Championships in New York City, New York, United States, and later seized an opportunity to compete for Ukraine at the 2004 Summer Olympics. Holovchenko also trained throughout her sporting career as a member of the women's freestyle wrestling team for CSK Belaya Zerkov in Kyiv, under her personal coach Serhiy Basitsi.

When women's wrestling made its debut at the 2004 Summer Olympics in Athens, Holovchenko qualified for the Ukrainian squad in the 63 kg class. Earlier in the process, she earned an Olympic spot by finishing fourth at the World Championships. Holovchenko lost two straight matches each to eventual Olympic champion Saori Yoshida of Japan on technical superiority and neighboring Russia's Alena Kartashova with a comfortable 7–0 verdict, leaving her on the bottom of the pool and placing last out of twelve wrestlers in the final standings.
