= Lene Aanes =

Norwegian sport wrestler

Personal information
- Born: 18 July 1976 (age 50)

Sport
- Sport: Wrestling
- Club: Narvik Atletklubb; Sportsklubben av 1909
Medal record
Representing Norway
Women's Freestyle wrestling
World Championships
| Silver medal – second place | 1995 | -57 kg |
| Silver medal – second place | 1998 | -62 kg |
| Bronze medal – third place | 1996 | -57 kg |
| Bronze medal – third place | 2001 | -62 kg |
| Bronze medal – third place | 2002 | -63 kg |
| Bronze medal – third place | 2005 | -59 kg |

Lene Aanes (born 18 July 1976) is a Norwegian sport wrestler.

== Biography ==
Aanes was born on 18 July 1976, and is a daughter of Bjørn Aanes. Her brother Fritz Aanes is also an international wrestler.

She became European Champion in 2003, and has won several medals at the FILA Wrestling World Championships. She was World Champion in sumo wrestling in 2000 and in 2001.
