= Nikola Hartmann =

Austrian freestyle wrestler

Personal information
- Full name: Nikola Hartmann-Duenser
- Born: 5 June 1975 (age 51)

Sport
- Country: Austria
- Sport: Amateur wrestling
- Event: Freestyle
Medal record
Women's freestyle wrestling
Representing Austria
World Championships
Gold medal – first place	1993 Toronto	61 kg
Gold medal – first place	1994 Istanbul	61 kg
Gold medal – first place	1995 Prague	61 kg
Gold medal – first place	1998 Tehran	62 kg
Gold medal – first place	2000 Sofia	62 kg

Nikola Hartmann (born 5 June 1975) is an Austrian freestyle wrestler. She won five gold medals at the World Wrestling Championships: in the 61-kg division in 1993, 1994, and 1995, and in the 62-kg category in 1998 and 2000.
