= Lise Legrand =

French wrestler (born 1976)

Personal information
- Born: 4 September 1976 (age 49)
Medal record
Women's freestyle wrestling
Representing France
Olympic Games
| Bronze medal – third place | 2004 Athens | 63 kg |
World Championships
| Bronze medal – third place | 1996 Sofia | 70 kg |

Lise Christiane Renée-Legrand (born 4 September 1976 in Boulogne-sur-Mer) is a female French wrestler who competed in the Women's Freestyle 63 kg at the 2004 Summer Olympics and won the bronze medal.
